= Gaétan Royer =

Canadian ice hockey player

- Born: March 13, 1976 (age 50) Donnacona, Quebec, Canada
- Height: 6 ft 3 in (191 cm)
- Weight: 198 lb (90 kg; 14 st 2 lb)
- Position: Right wing
- Shot: Right
- Played for: Tampa Bay Lightning
- NHL draft: Undrafted
- Playing career: 1996–2007

Gaétan Royer (born March 13, 1976) is a Canadian former professional ice hockey right winger.

== Biography ==
Royer was born in Donnacona, Quebec. As a youth, he played in the 1990 Quebec International Pee-Wee Hockey Tournament with a minor ice hockey team from Sainte-Foy, Quebec City. He played three games in the National Hockey League with the Tampa Bay Lightning in the 2001–02 season, going scoreless. In 2008, Royer played for the Bartercard Gold Coast Blue Tongues in the Australian Ice Hockey League (AIHL).

== Career statistics ==
			Regular season					Playoffs
Season	Team	League	GP	G	A	Pts	PIM	GP	G	A	Pts	PIM
1994–95	Sherbrooke Faucons	QMJHL	65	11	25	36	194	7	0	2	2	6
1995–96	Sherbrooke Faucons	QMJHL	36	25	26	51	174	—	—	—	—	—
1995–96	Beauport Harfangs	QMJHL	25	11	10	21	59	19	5	9	14	47
1996–97	Jacksonville Lizard Kings	ECHL	28	7	8	15	149	—	—	—	—	—
1996–97	Indianapolis Ice	IHL	29	2	4	6	60	—	—	—	—	—
1998–99	Saint John Flames	AHL	15	1	0	1	36	7	0	1	1	8
1998–99	Grand Rapids Griffins	IHL	52	12	6	18	177	—	—	—	—	—
1999–00	Michigan K-Wings	IHL	20	6	2	8	64	—	—	—	—	—
2000–01	Saint John Flames	AHL	58	8	4	12	134	14	0	0	0	16
2001–02	Muskegon Lumberjacks	UHL	1	0	0	0	7	—	—	—	—	—
2001–02	Tampa Bay Lightning	NHL	3	0	0	0	2	—	—	—	—	—
2001–02	Springfield Falcons	AHL	40	6	4	10	112	—	—	—	—	—
2001–02	Pensacola Ice Pilots	ECHL	33	13	10	23	129	—	—	—	—	—
2002–03	Springfield Falcons	AHL	33	2	5	7	50	6	2	0	2	15
2002–03	Jackson Bandits	ECHL	11	3	6	9	58	—	—	—	—	—
2002–03	Pensacola Ice Pilots	ECHL	20	3	10	13	60	—	—	—	—	—
2003–04	Pont-Rouge Caron & Guay	QSPHL	43	28	25	53	272	11	5	7	12	42
2004–05	Trois-Rivieres Caron & Guay	LNAH	30	13	9	22	78	—	—	—	—	—
2004–05	Thetford Mines Prolab	LNAH	24	10	12	22	56	—	—	—	—	—
2005–06	Thetford Mines Prolab	LNAH	35	10	16	26	145	—	—	—	—	—
2006–07	Thetford Mines Prolab	LNAH	2	0	3	3	6	—	—	—	—	—
2006–07	Shawinigan Xtreme	QSCHL	22	7	17	24	70	—	—	—	—	—
2007–08	Quebec RadioX	LNAH	49	30	14	44	136	—	—	—	—	—
2007–08	Gold Coast Blue Tongues	AIHL	19	19	14	33	147	—	—	—	—	—
2008–09	Saguenay 98.3	LNAH	34	21	19	40	78	—	—	—	—	—
2009–10	Riviere-du-Loup CIMT	LNAH	39	20	23	43	113	—	—	—	—	—
2010–11	Riviere-du-Loup 3L	LNAH	42	12	18	30	95	—	—	—	—	—
2011–12	Saint-Georges Cool FM 103.5	LNAH	27	7	10	17	71	—	—	—	—	—
2012–13	Saint-Georges COOL-FM	LNAH	1	0	0	0	9	—	—	—	—	—
2012–13	Thetford Mines Isothermic	LNAH	12	1	0	1	33	5	0	2	2	0
2013–14	Thetford Mines Isothermic	LNAH	5	0	2	2	4	—	—	—	—	—
NHL totals			3	0	0	0	2	—	—	—	—	—
AHL totals			146	17	13	30	332	27	2	1	3	39
ECHL totals			92	26	34	60	396	—	—	—	—	—
LNAH totals			300	124	126	250	824	5	0	2	2	0
