= Eric Lavigne =

Canadian ice hockey player

- Born: November 4, 1972 (age 53) Victoriaville, Quebec, Canada
- Height: 6 ft 3 in (191 cm)
- Weight: 225 lb (102 kg; 16 st 1 lb)
- Position: Defence
- Shot: Left
- Played for: Los Angeles Kings; Nottingham Panthers
- NHL draft: 25th overall, 1991; Washington Capitals
- Playing career: 1993–2009

Eric T. Lavigne (born November 4, 1972) is a Canadian former professional ice hockey defenceman. He played one game in the National Hockey League with the Los Angeles Kings during the 1994–95 season, on February 20, 1995 against the Vancouver Canucks. The rest of his career, which lasted from 1993 to 2009, was mainly spent in the minor leagues.

== Biography ==
Lavigne was born in Victoriaville, Quebec. As a youth, he played in the 1985 Quebec International Pee-Wee Hockey Tournament with a minor ice hockey team from Beauport, Quebec City.

Lavigne was selected in the 2nd round (25th overall) in the 1991 NHL entry draft by the Washington Capitals.He played one game in the National Hockey League with the Los Angeles Kings during the 1994–95 NHL season. He also played in the International Hockey League, the American Hockey League, and later in the Ligue Nord-Américaine de Hockey.

== Career statistics ==
=== Regular season and playoffs ===
			Regular season					Playoffs
Season	Team	League	GP	G	A	Pts	PIM	GP	G	A	Pts	PIM
1988–89	Sainte-Foy Gouverneurs	QMAAA	39	2	10	12	95	13	3	7	10	38
1989–90	Hull Olympiques	QMJHL	69	7	11	18	203	11	0	0	0	32
1990–91	Hull Olympiques	QMJHL	66	11	11	22	153	4	0	1	1	16
1991–92	Hull Olympiques	QMJHL	46	4	17	21	99	6	0	0	0	32
1992–93	Hull Olympiques	QMJHL	59	7	19	26	223	10	2	4	6	47
1993–94	Phoenix Roadrunners	IHL	62	3	11	14	168	—	—	—	—	—
1994–95	Los Angeles Kings	NHL	1	0	0	0	0	—	—	—	—	—
1994–95	Phoenix Roadrunners	IHL	69	4	10	14	223	—	—	—	—	—
1994–95	Detroit Vipers	IHL	1	0	0	0	0	5	0	0	0	26
1995–96	Prince Edward Island Senators	AHL	72	5	13	18	154	2	0	0	0	6
1996–97	Rochester Americans	AHL	46	1	6	7	89	6	0	1	1	21
1997–98	Rochester Americans	AHL	28	0	1	1	118	—	—	—	—	—
1997–98	Grand Rapids Griffins	IHL	4	0	1	1	13	—	—	—	—	—
1997–98	Cleveland Lumberjacks	IHL	16	0	0	0	34	10	1	1	2	44
1998–99	Cleveland Lumberjacks	IHL	66	11	7	18	259	—	—	—	—	—
1999–00	Cleveland Lumberjacks	IHL	11	0	2	2	21	—	—	—	—	—
1999–00	Michigan K-Wings	IHL	22	0	2	2	70	—	—	—	—	—
2000–01	Nottingham Panthers	BISL	44	0	6	6	168	6	0	0	0	12
2001–02	Hull Thunder	BNL	42	14	35	49	163	5	0	1	1	8
2002–03	Hull Thunder	BNL	24	5	12	17	113	—	—	—	—	—
2002–03	Prolab de Thetford Mines	QSPHL	17	8	13	21	75	22	4	6	10	96
2003–04	Prolab de Thetford Mines	QSPHL	43	11	10	21	227	15	3	7	10	47
2004–05	Prolab de Thetford Mines	LNAH	51	5	19	24	106	—	—	—	—	—
2005–06	Prolab de Thetford Mines	LNAH	48	2	18	20	137	—	—	—	—	—
2006–07	CRS Express de Saint-Georges	LNAH	41	1	11	12	110	—	—	—	—	—
2007–08	Isothermic de Thetford Mines	LNAH	17	0	6	6	46	—	—	—	—	—
2007–08	Radio X de Québec	LNAH	27	1	4	5	54	—	—	—	—	—
2008–09	Poutrelles Delta de Sainte-Marie	LNAH	27	1	1	2	75	—	—	—	—	—
2011–12	Beauceville Rene Bernard	LHBBF	19	1	3	4	77	—	—	—	—	—
IHL totals			251	18	33	51	798	15	1	1	2	70
QSPHL/LNAH totals			271	29	82	111	830	37	7	13	20	143
NHL totals			1	0	0	0	0	—	—	—	—	—

== See also ==
- List of players who played only one game in the NHL
