= Marquis Mathieu =

American ice hockey player (born 1973)

- Born: May 31, 1973 (age 52) Hartford, Connecticut, U.S.
- Height: 5 ft 11 in (180 cm)
- Weight: 190 lb (86 kg; 13 st 8 lb)
- Position: Center
- Shot: Right
- Played for: Boston Bruins
- NHL draft: Undrafted
- Playing career: 1993–2009

Marquis Mathieu (born May 31, 1973) is an American former professional ice hockey player.

Mathieu was born in Hartford, Connecticut. As a youth, he played in the 1987 Quebec International Pee-Wee Hockey Tournament with a minor ice hockey team from Rive-Sud. He later played 16 games in the National Hockey League for the Boston Bruins.

== Career statistics ==
=== Regular season and playoffs ===
			Regular season					Playoffs
Season	Team	League	GP	G	A	Pts	PIM	GP	G	A	Pts	PIM
1989–90	Sainte-Foy Gouverneurs	QMAAA	42	30	44	74	—	12	7	14	21	—
1990–91	Hawkesbury Hawks	CJHL	20	6	8	14	62	—	—	—	—	—
1990–91	Beauport Harfangs	QMJHL	26	4	13	17	73	—	—	—	—	—
1991–92	Saint-Jean Lynx	QMJHL	70	20	37	57	159	—	—	—	—	—
1992–93	Saint-Jean Lynx	QMJHL	70	31	36	67	117	2	1	0	1	33
1993–94	Wheeling Thunderbirds	ECHL	42	12	11	23	75	9	1	3	4	23
1993–94	Fredericton Canadiens	AHL	22	4	6	10	28	—	—	—	—	—
1994–95	Raleigh IceCaps	ECHL	33	15	17	32	181	—	—	—	—	—
1994–95	Toledo Storm	ECHL	33	13	22	35	168	—	—	—	—	—
1994–95	Worcester IceCats	AHL	2	0	0	0	0	—	—	—	—	—
1995–96	Johnstown Chiefs	ECHL	25	4	17	21	89	—	—	—	—	—
1995–96	Birmingham Bulls	ECHL	18	5	7	12	87	—	—	—	—	—
1995–96	Worcester IceCats	AHL	17	3	10	13	26	—	—	—	—	—
1995–96	Houston Aeros	IHL	2	1	0	1	9	—	—	—	—	—
1996–97	Worcester IceCats	AHL	30	8	16	24	88	1	0	0	0	0
1997–98	Wheeling Nailers	ECHL	58	26	29	55	276	15	1	10	11	38
1998–99	Boston Bruins	NHL	9	0	0	0	8	—	—	—	—	—
1998–99	Providence Bruins	AHL	64	15	15	30	166	19	4	7	11	30
1999–00	Boston Bruins	NHL	6	0	2	2	4	—	—	—	—	—
1999–00	Providence Bruins	AHL	18	3	3	6	45	—	—	—	—	—
2000–01	Boston Bruins	NHL	1	0	0	0	0	—	—	—	—	—
2000–01	Providence Bruins	AHL	57	10	7	17	205	17	3	2	5	64
2001–02	Garaga de Saint-Georges	QSPHL	14	5	13	18	4	—	—	—	—	—
2002–03	Baton Rouge Kingfish	ECHL	44	13	17	30	104	—	—	—	—	—
2002–03	Pensacola Ice Pilots	ECHL	15	3	10	13	74	4	0	0	0	4
2003–04	Wilkes-Barre/Scranton Penguins	AHL	77	10	14	24	105	24	0	4	4	64
2004–05	Prolab de Thetford Mines	LNAH	38	24	30	54	28	—	—	—	—	—
2004–05	Kölner Haie	DEL	9	1	2	3	4	5	1	1	2	8
2005–06	Prolab de Thetford Mines	LNAH	54	25	33	58	56	—	—	—	—	—
2006–07	Prolab de Thetford Mines	LNAH	45	13	51	64	48	—	—	—	—	—
2007–08	Isothermic de Thetford Mines	LNAH	10	3	13	16	8	—	—	—	—	—
2007–08	CRS Express de Saint-Georges	LNAH	20	4	9	13	6	—	—	—	—	—
2007–08	Radio X de Québec	LNAH	15	4	11	15	12	—	—	—	—	—
2008–09	Poutrelles Delta de Sainte-Marie	LNAH	12	4	5	9	14	—	—	—	—	—
AHL totals			287	53	71	124	663	61	7	13	20	158
NHL totals			16	0	2	2	14	—	—	—	—	—
