= Sylvain Blouin =

Canadian ice hockey player

- Born: May 21, 1974 (age 50); Montreal, Quebec, Canada
- Height: 6 ft 2 in (188 cm)
- Weight: 222 lb (101 kg; 15 st 12 lb)
- Position: Left wing
- Shot: Left
- Played for: New York Rangers; Montreal Canadiens; Minnesota Wild
- NHL draft: 104th overall, 1994; New York Rangers
- Playing career: 1996–2003

Sylvain Lucien Blouin (born May 21, 1974) is a Canadian former professional ice hockey player who played 115 games in the National Hockey League between 1996 and 2003. He played with the New York Rangers, Montreal Canadiens, and Minnesota Wild.

== Career statistics ==
			Regular season					Playoffs
Season	Team	League	GP	G	A	Pts	PIM	GP	G	A	Pts	PIM
1991–92	Laval Titan	QMJHL	28	0	0	0	23	9	0	0	0	37
1992–93	Laval Titan	QMJHL	68	0	10	10	363	13	1	0	1	66
1992–93	Laval Titan	M-Cup	—	—	—	—	—	5	0	2	2	14
1993–94	Laval Titan	QMJHL	62	18	22	40	500	21	4	13	17	177
1993–94	Laval Titan	M-Cup	—	—	—	—	—	5	0	2	2	30
1994–95	Chicago Wolves	IHL	1	0	0	0	2	—	—	—	—	—
1994–95	Charlotte Checkers	ECHL	50	5	7	12	280	3	0	0	0	6
1994–95	Binghamton Rangers	AHL	10	1	0	1	46	2	0	0	0	24
1995–96	Binghamton Rangers	AHL	71	5	8	13	352	4	0	3	3	4
1996–97	New York Rangers	NHL	6	0	0	0	18	—	—	—	—	—
1996–97	Binghamton Rangers	AHL	62	13	17	30	301	4	2	1	3	16
1997–98	New York Rangers	NHL	1	0	0	0	5	—	—	—	—	—
1997–98	Hartford Wolf Pack	AHL	53	8	9	17	286	9	0	1	1	63
1998–99	Montreal Canadiens	NHL	5	0	0	0	19	—	—	—	—	—
1998–99	Fredericton Canadiens	AHL	67	6	10	16	333	15	2	0	2	87
1999–00	Worcester IceCats	AHL	70	16	18	34	337	8	3	5	8	30
2000–01	Minnesota Wild	NHL	41	3	2	5	117	—	—	—	—	—
2001–02	Minnesota Wild	NHL	43	0	2	2	130	—	—	—	—	—
2002–03	Minnesota Wild	NHL	2	0	0	0	4	—	—	—	—	—
2002–03	Montreal Canadiens	NHL	17	0	0	0	43	—	—	—	—	—
2002–03	Hamilton Bulldogs	AHL	19	2	4	6	39	11	1	1	2	28
2003–04	Hamilton Bulldogs	AHL	29	2	1	3	75	—	—	—	—	—
2003–04	Manitoba Moose	AHL	11	1	0	1	22	—	—	—	—	—
2004–05	Radio X de Québec	LNAH	35	14	18	32	256	12	6	3	9	66
2005–06	Radio X de Québec	LNAH	40	16	19	35	149	—	—	—	—	—
2006–07	Radio X de Québec	LNAH	1	0	0	0	19	—	—	—	—	—
2006–07	Sainte-Marie Poutrelles Delta	QSCHL	26	14	6	20	96	—	—	—	—	—
2007–08	Radio X de Québec	LNAH	5	3	3	6	6	—	—	—	—	—
2008–09	Pont-Rouge Lois Jeans	LNAH	11	6	5	11	29	—	—	—	—	—
2009–10	Pont-Rouge Lois Jeans	LNAH	9	2	4	6	33	—	—	—	—	—
AHL totals			392	54	67	121	1791	53	8	11	19	252
NHL totals			115	3	4	7	336	—	—	—	—	—
