= Jean-Yves Leroux =

Canadian ice hockey player

- Born: June 24, 1976 (age 49) Montreal, Quebec, Canada
- Height: 6 ft 2 in (188 cm)
- Weight: 211 lb (96 kg; 15 st 1 lb)
- Position: Left wing
- Shot: Left
- Played for: Chicago Blackhawks
- NHL draft: 40th overall, 1994; Chicago Blackhawks
- Playing career: 1996–2010

Jean-Yves Leroux (born June 24, 1976) is a Canadian former professional ice hockey forward. He played in the National Hockey League with the Chicago Blackhawks from 1997 to 2001.

== Early life ==
Leroux was born in Montreal, Quebec. As a youth, he played in the 1989 and 1990 Quebec International Pee-Wee Hockey Tournaments with a minor ice hockey team from Montreal.

== Career ==
Leroux started his National Hockey League (NHL) career with the Chicago Blackhawks in the 1996–97 NHL season. He spent his entire NHL career with the Hawks. He left the NHL after the 2000–01 NHL season.

== Career statistics ==
=== Regular season and playoffs ===
| | | | Regular season | | | | | Playoffs |
| Season | Team | League | GP | G | A | Pts | PIM | GP | G | A | Pts | PIM |
|---|---|---|---|---|---|---|---|---|---|---|---|---|
| 1991–92 | Montreal-Bourassa Canadien | QMAAA | 35 | 14 | 31 | 45 | 62 | 7 | 1 | 3 | 4 | 8 |
| 1992–93 | Beauport Harfangs | QMJHL | 62 | 20 | 25 | 45 | 33 | — | — | — | — | — |
| 1993–94 | Beauport Harfangs | QMJHL | 45 | 14 | 25 | 39 | 43 | 15 | 7 | 6 | 13 | 33 |
| 1994–95 | Beauport Harfangs | QMJHL | 59 | 19 | 34 | 53 | 125 | 17 | 4 | 6 | 10 | 39 |
| 1995–96 | Beauport Harfangs | QMJHL | 54 | 41 | 41 | 82 | 176 | 20 | 5 | 18 | 23 | 20 |
| 1996–97 | Chicago Blackhawks | NHL | 1 | 0 | 1 | 1 | 5 | — | — | — | — | — |
| 1996–97 | Indianapolis Ice | IHL | 69 | 14 | 17 | 31 | 112 | 4 | 1 | 0 | 1 | 2 |
| 1997–98 | Chicago Blackhawks | NHL | 66 | 6 | 7 | 13 | 55 | — | — | — | — | — |
| 1998–99 | Chicago Blackhawks | NHL | 40 | 3 | 5 | 8 | 21 | — | — | — | — | — |
| 1998–99 | Chicago Wolves | IHL | — | — | — | — | — | 10 | 1 | 1 | 2 | 18 |
| 1999–00 | Chicago Blackhawks | NHL | 54 | 3 | 5 | 8 | 43 | — | — | — | — | — |
| 2000–01 | Chicago Blackhawks | NHL | 59 | 4 | 4 | 8 | 22 | — | — | — | — | — |
| 2001–02 | Norfolk Admirals | AHL | 59 | 8 | 16 | 24 | 94 | 4 | 1 | 0 | 1 | 0 |
| 2002–03 | Garaga de Saint-Georges | QSPHL | 26 | 9 | 30 | 39 | 29 | — | — | — | — | — |
| 2003–04 | Garaga de Saint-Georges | QSPHL | 36 | 16 | 23 | 39 | 40 | 23 | 7 | 13 | 20 | 28 |
| 2004–05 | Radio X de Québec | LNAH | 40 | 10 | 27 | 37 | 56 | 14 | 3 | 8 | 11 | 27 |
| 2005–06 | Radio X de Québec | LNAH | 35 | 12 | 27 | 39 | 63 | — | — | — | — | — |
| 2006–07 | Sainte-Marie Poutrelles Delta | QSCHL | 28 | 13 | 18 | 31 | 60 | — | — | — | — | — |
| 2007–08 | Radio X de Québec | LNAH | 41 | 12 | 18 | 30 | 54 | 13 | 2 | 8 | 10 | 8 |
| 2008–09 | Lois Jeans de Pont-Rouge | LNAH | 31 | 5 | 20 | 25 | 69 | — | — | — | — | — |
| 2009–10 | Lois Jeans de Pont-Rouge | LNAH | 13 | 1 | 5 | 6 | 17 | — | — | — | — | — |
| NHL totals | | | 220 | 16 | 22 | 38 | 146 | — | — | — | — | — |
