= Michel Picard (ice hockey) =

Canadian ice hockey player (born 1969)

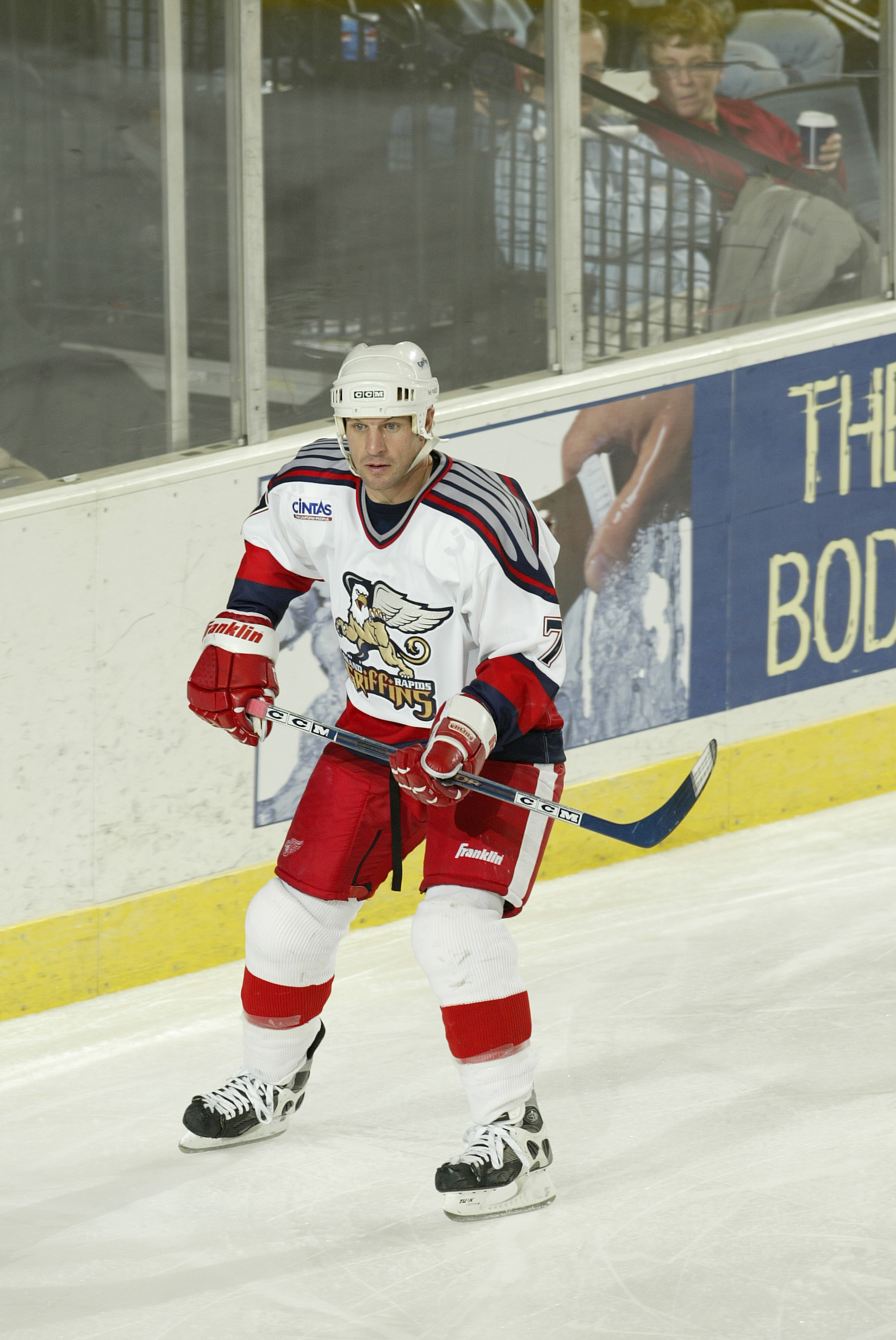
- Picard with the Grand Rapids Griffins during the 2002–03 season
- Born: November 7, 1969 (age 57) Beauport, Quebec City, Quebec, Canada
- Height: 5 ft 11 in (180 cm)
- Weight: 190 lb (86 kg; 13 st 8 lb)
- Position: Left wing
- Shot: Left
- Played for: Hartford Whalers; San Jose Sharks; Ottawa Senators; St. Louis Blues; Edmonton Oilers; Philadelphia Flyers
- NHL draft: 178th overall, 1989; Hartford Whalers
- Playing career: 1990–2009

Michel Daniel Picard (born November 7, 1969) is a Canadian former professional ice hockey player. Picard played in the National Hockey League (NHL) with the Hartford Whalers, San Jose Sharks, Ottawa Senators, St. Louis Blues, Edmonton Oilers, and Philadelphia Flyers. As of 2018, he serves as an amateur scout for the Blues.

== Playing career ==
As a youth, Picard played in the 1981 and 1982 Quebec International Pee-Wee Hockey Tournaments with a minor ice hockey team from Beauport, Quebec City.

Picard began his career playing for Trois-Rivières Draveurs in the QMJHL, where he established himself as a scoring force who was also tough and hard hitting. His final year there he scored 140 points in 66 games.

Picard was drafted by the Whalers in the 9th round, 178th overall, in the 1989 NHL entry draft. He met with great success in the minor leagues, leading the American Hockey League with a franchise-record 56 goals for the Springfield Indians in 1991, while leading the team to its final Calder Cup championship.

However, Picard would never translate his earlier success to the NHL. He never played a full season in the NHL and only played in at least half of the games in a season once, during the 1999 season. That season he also played in five playoff games, the only time he played in the NHL playoffs.

For the 2002 season Picard played in the Deutsche Eishockey Liga in Germany for the Adler Mannheim. He then played for two years with the Grand Rapids Griffins (a team for which he played parts of six seasons in all, and is the career leader in goals, assists and points) in the AHL before joining Thetford Mines Prolab of the Ligue Nord-Américaine de Hockey in 2004. He led the team in scoring in 2005, 2006 and 2007 and was the leading scorer in the LNAH in the 2007 season, retiring after the end of the 2009 season.

As of November 2014, Picard is the 16th leading goal scorer in minor league history with 563 , as well as 19th in points with 1256.

== Career statistics ==
=== Regular season and playoffs ===
			Regular season					Playoffs
Season	Team	League	GP	G	A	Pts	PIM	GP	G	A	Pts	PIM
1985–86	Sainte-Foy Gouverneurs	QMAAA	42	53	34	87	—	—	—	—	—	—
1986–87	Trois-Rivières Draveurs	QMJHL	66	33	35	68	53	—	—	—	—	—
1987–88	Trois-Rivières Draveurs	QMJHL	69	40	55	95	71	—	—	—	—	—
1988–89	Trois-Rivières Draveurs	QMJHL	66	59	81	140	107	4	1	3	4	2
1989–90	Binghamton Whalers	AHL	67	16	24	40	98	—	—	—	—	—
1990–91	Springfield Indians	AHL	77	56	40	96	61	18	8	13	21	18
1990–91	Hartford Whalers	NHL	5	1	0	1	2	—	—	—	—	—
1991–92	Springfield Indians	AHL	40	21	17	38	44	11	2	0	2	34
1991–92	Hartford Whalers	NHL	25	3	5	8	6	—	—	—	—	—
1992–93	Kansas City Blades	IHL	33	7	10	17	51	12	3	2	5	20
1992–93	San Jose Sharks	NHL	25	4	0	4	24	—	—	—	—	—
1993–94	Portland Pirates	AHL	61	41	44	85	99	17	11	10	21	22
1994–95	PEI Senators	AHL	57	32	57	89	58	8	4	4	8	6
1994–95	Ottawa Senators	NHL	24	5	8	13	14	—	—	—	—	—
1995–96	Ottawa Senators	NHL	17	2	6	8	10	—	—	—	—	—
1995–96	PEI Senators	AHL	55	37	45	82	79	5	5	1	6	2
1996–97	Västra Frölunda HC	SEL	3	0	1	1	0	—	—	—	—	—
1996–97	Grand Rapids Griffins	IHL	82	46	55	101	58	5	2	0	2	10
1997–98	Grand Rapids Griffins	IHL	58	28	41	69	42	—	—	—	—	—
1997–98	St. Louis Blues	NHL	16	1	8	9	29	—	—	—	—	—
1998–99	Grand Rapids Griffins	IHL	6	2	2	4	2	—	—	—	—	—
1998–99	St. Louis Blues	NHL	45	11	11	22	16	5	0	0	0	2
1999–00	Grand Rapids Griffins	IHL	65	33	35	68	50	17	8	10	18	4
1999–00	Edmonton Oilers	NHL	2	0	0	0	2	—	—	—	—	—
2000–01	Philadelphia Phantoms	AHL	72	31	39	70	22	10	4	5	9	4
2000–01	Philadelphia Flyers	NHL	7	1	4	5	0	—	—	—	—	—
2001–02	Adler Mannheim	DEL	60	24	28	52	30	12	7	6	13	4
2002–03	Grand Rapids Griffins	AHL	78	32	52	84	34	15	3	1	4	8
2003–04	Grand Rapids Griffins	AHL	75	17	37	54	35	4	0	0	0	2
2003–04	Thetford Mines Prolab	LNAH	60	36	55	91	22	17	6	11	17	8
2005–06	Thetford Mines Prolab	LNAH	55	50	37	87	35	18	5	15	20	12
2006–07	Thetford Mines Prolab	LNAH	48	48	51	99	18	7	6	3	9	2
2007–08	Thetford Mines Isothermic	LNAH	52	22	51	73	36	7	3	6	9	2
2008–09	Sainte-Marie Poutrelles Delta	LNAH	7	5	5	10	4	—	—	—	—	—
2008–09	Thetford Mines Isothermic	LNAH	7	3	4	7	2	1	0	1	1	0
AHL totals			582	283	355	638	530	88	37	34	71	96
NHL totals			166	28	42	70	103	5	0	0	0	2
