= Patrice Tardif (ice hockey) =

Canadian ice hockey player

- Born: October 30, 1970 (age 55) Thetford Mines, Quebec, Canada
- Height: 6 ft 1 in (185 cm)
- Weight: 202 lb (92 kg; 14 st 6 lb)
- Position: Centre
- Shot: Left
- Played for: St. Louis Blues; Los Angeles Kings; Kassel Huskies; HC Bolzano
- NHL draft: 54th overall, 1990; St. Louis Blues
- Playing career: 1994–2008

Patrice Pamphile Tardif (born October 30, 1970) is a Canadian former ice hockey centre. He played 65 games in the National Hockey League with the St. Louis Blues and Los Angeles Kings during the 1994–95 and 1995–96 seasons. The rest of his career, which lasted from 1994 to 2008, was mainly spent in the minor leagues.

== Early life ==
Tardif was born in Thetford Mines, Quebec. As a youth, he played in the 1982 and 1983 Quebec International Pee-Wee Hockey Tournaments with a minor ice hockey team from Thetford Mines.

== Career ==
Making his debut with the St. Louis Blues, Tardif was traded along with Roman Vopat, Craig Johnson, and draft picks to the Los Angeles Kings in 1996 for Wayne Gretzky.

== Personal life ==
Tardif's grandfather was former Union Nationale politician, Patrice Tardif.

== Career statistics ==
=== Regular season and playoffs ===
			Regular season					Playoffs
Season	Team	League	GP	G	A	Pts	PIM	GP	G	A	Pts	PIM
1988–89	Black Lake Miners	QJHL-B	32	37	33	70	—	—	—	—	—	—
1989–90	Lennoxville Junior College	QCAA	27	58	36	94	36	7	2	3	5	2
1990–91	University of Maine	HE	36	13	12	25	18	—	—	—	—	—
1991–92	University of Maine	HE	31	18	20	38	14	—	—	—	—	—
1992–93	University of Maine	HE	45	23	25	48	22	—	—	—	—	—
1993–94	University of Maine	HE	34	18	15	33	42	—	—	—	—	—
1993–94	Peoria Rivermen	IHL	11	4	4	8	21	4	2	0	2	4
1994–95	St. Louis Blues	NHL	27	3	10	13	29	—	—	—	—	—
1994–95	Peoria Rivermen	IHL	53	27	18	45	83	—	—	—	—	—
1995–96	St. Louis Blues	NHL	23	3	0	3	12	—	—	—	—	—
1995–96	Los Angeles Kings	NHL	15	1	1	2	37	—	—	—	—	—
1995–96	Worcester IceCats	AHL	30	13	13	26	69	—	—	—	—	—
1996–97	Phoenix Roadrunners	IHL	9	0	3	3	13	—	—	—	—	—
1996–97	Detroit Vipers	IHL	66	24	23	47	70	11	0	1	1	8
1997–98	Detroit Vipers	IHL	28	10	9	19	24	15	3	7	10	14
1997–98	Rochester Americans	AHL	41	13	13	26	68	—	—	—	—	—
1998–99	Manitoba Moose	IHL	63	21	35	56	88	5	1	2	3	0
199–00	Quebec Citadelles	AHL	18	9	10	19	23	3	1	1	2	8
1999–00	Manitoba Moose	IHL	50	12	18	30	70	—	—	—	—	—
2000–01	Kassel Huskies	DEL	50	11	14	25	34	8	1	4	5	10
2001–02	HC Bolzano	ITA	4	0	2	2	4	—	—	—	—	—
2001–02	Prolab de Thetford Mines	QSPHL	40	28	30	58	53	—	—	—	—	—
2002–03	Prolab de Thetford Mines	QSPHL	49	28	48	76	77	22	18	15	33	27
2003–04	Prolab de Thetford Mines	QSPHL	40	21	30	51	36	15	10	18	28	10
2004–05	Prolab de Thetford Mines	LNAH	41	13	28	41	56	—	—	—	—	—
2005–06	Prolab de Thetford Mines	LNAH	47	13	33	46	52	—	—	—	—	—
2006–07	Prolab de Thetford Mines	LNAH	44	20	27	47	48	—	—	—	—	—
2007–08	Isothermic de Thetford Mines	LNAH	4	0	1	1	8	—	—	—	—	—
IHL totals			280	98	110	208	369	35	6	10	16	26
NHL totals			65	7	11	18	78	—	—	—	—	—

== Awards and honors ==
Award	Year
All-Hockey East Rookie Team	1990–91
