= 2000–01 Montreal Canadiens season =

NHL hockey team season

2000–01 Montreal Canadiens
- Division: 5th Northeast
- Conference: 11th Eastern
- 2000–01 record: 28–40–8–6
- Home record: 15–20–4–2
- Road record: 13–20–4–4
- Goals for: 206
- Goals against: 232

Team information
- General manager: Rejean Houle (Oct.–Nov.); Andre Savard (Nov.–Apr.)
- Coach: Alain Vigneault (Oct.–Nov.); Michel Therrien (Nov.–Apr.)
- Captain: Saku Koivu
- Arena: Molson Centre
- Average attendance: 20,105 (94.5%)
- Minor league affiliates: Quebec Citadelles; Tallahassee Tiger Sharks

Team leaders
- Goals: Brian Savage (21)
- Assists: Saku Koivu; Oleg Petrov (30)
- Points: Saku Koivu; Oleg Petrov (47)
- Penalty minutes: Sheldon Souray (95)
- Plus/minus: Karl Dykhuis (+9)
- Wins: Jose Theodore (20)
- Goals against average: Mathieu Garon (2.44)

The 2000–01 Montreal Canadiens season was the club's 92nd season of play. The club finished fifth in the Northeast Division and did not qualify for the Stanley Cup playoffs for a third consecutive season, marking the first such drought for the franchise since the 1919–20 season to the 1921–22 season .

== Regular season ==
- After a loss to the Washington Capitals on November 17, the Canadiens had the worst record in the NHL. The two expansion teams, Minnesota and Columbus were ahead of them in the standings. After losing to the Toronto Maple Leafs on home ice on November 18, Rejean Houle and Alain Vigneault were fired. On November 20, Andre Savard was made the new general manager, while Michel Therrien of the Quebec Citadelles became the new head coach. Despite the changes, the Canadiens had one win, ten losses and two ties in the month of December.
- At the end of December, Dan O'Neill, president of Molson met with George N. Gillett, Jr. Gillett had shown interest in the Florida Panthers, New York Islanders, Ottawa Senators, and the Phoenix Coyotes. After the meeting, Gillett agreed to be the new owner. Gillett acquired the Molson Centre and eighty percent of the franchise for two hundred and seventy-five million dollars.
- February 13, 2001: Patrick Roy made his first visit to Montreal since breaking Terry Sawchuk's record for most wins by a goaltender. Roy had won 289 games with Montreal, and the Canadiens held a pregame ceremony for Roy.
- The Canadiens allowed the fewest short-handed goals during the regular season, with just three.

=== Final standings ===
Northeast Division
No.	CR		GP	W	L	T	OTL	GF	GA	Pts
1	2	**Ottawa Senators**	82	48	21	9	4	274	205	109
2	5	**Buffalo Sabres**	82	46	30	5	1	218	184	98
3	7	**Toronto Maple Leafs**	82	37	29	11	5	232	207	90
4	9	Boston Bruins	82	36	30	8	8	227	249	88
5	11	Montreal Canadiens	82	28	40	8	6	206	232	70

Note: CR = Conference rank; GP = Games played; W = Wins; L = Losses; T = Ties; OTL=Overtime loss; GF = Goals for; GA = Goals against; Pts = Points
Bolded teams qualified for the playoffs.

Eastern Conference
R		Div	GP	W	L	T	OTL	GF	GA	Pts
**1**	**Z-** New Jersey Devils	**AT**	**82**	**48**	**19**	**12**	**3**	**295**	**195**	111
**2**	**Y-** Ottawa Senators	**NE**	**82**	**48**	**21**	**9**	**4**	**274**	**205**	109
**3**	**Y-** Washington Capitals	**SE**	**82**	**41**	**27**	**10**	**4**	**233**	**211**	96
**4**	**X-** Philadelphia Flyers	**AT**	**82**	**43**	**25**	**11**	**3**	**240**	**207**	100
**5**	**X-** Buffalo Sabres	**NE**	**82**	**46**	**30**	**5**	**1**	**218**	**184**	98
**6**	**X-** Pittsburgh Penguins	**AT**	**82**	**42**	**28**	**9**	**3**	**281**	**256**	96
**7**	**X-** Toronto Maple Leafs	**NE**	**82**	**37**	**29**	**11**	**5**	**232**	**207**	90
**8**	**X-** Carolina Hurricanes	**SE**	**82**	**38**	**32**	**9**	**3**	**212**	**225**	88
8.5
9	Boston Bruins	NE	82	36	30	8	8	227	249	88
10	New York Rangers	AT	82	33	43	5	1	250	290	72
11	Montreal Canadiens	NE	82	28	40	8	6	206	232	70
12	Florida Panthers	SE	82	22	38	13	9	200	246	66
13	Atlanta Thrashers	SE	82	23	45	12	2	211	289	60
14	Tampa Bay Lightning	SE	82	24	47	6	5	201	280	59
15	New York Islanders	AT	82	21	51	7	3	185	268	52

Divisions: AT – Atlantic, NE – Northeast, SE – Southeast

Z – Clinched conference; Y – Clinched division; X – Clinched playoff spot

== Schedule and results ==
2000–01 regular season
October: 4–5–2–0 (home: 4–1–1–0; road: 0–4–1–0)

Game	Date	Score	Opponent	Record	Points	Recap
1	October 6, 2000	4–8	@ New Jersey Devils	0–1–0–0	0	L
2	October 7, 2000	0–2	@ Toronto Maple Leafs	0–2–0–0	0	L
3	October 10, 2000	5–2	Edmonton Oilers	1–2–0–0	2	W
4	October 11, 2000	1–3	@ New York Rangers	1–3–0–0	2	L
5	October 14, 2000	5–4 OT	Chicago Blackhawks	2–3–0–0	4	W
6	October 17, 2000	4–3	Buffalo Sabres	3–3–0–0	6	W
7	October 19, 2000	3–3 OT	@ Philadelphia Flyers	3–3–1–0	7	T
8	October 21, 2000	5–2	Carolina Hurricanes	4–3–1–0	9	W
9	October 24, 2000	2–2 OT	Minnesota Wild	4–3–2–0	10	T
10	October 27, 2000	1–2	@ New York Islanders	4–4–2–0	10	L
11	October 28, 2000	1–2	New York Islanders	4–5–2–0	10	L

November: 5–10–0–0 (home: 1–6–0–0; road: 4–4–0–0)

Game	Date	Score	Opponent	Record	Points	Recap
12	November 1, 2000	2–4	Detroit Red Wings	4–6–2–0	10	L
13	November 3, 2000	4–5	@ Buffalo Sabres	4–7–2–0	10	L
14	November 4, 2000	2–5	New York Rangers	4–8–2–0	10	L
15	November 8, 2000	4–2	@ Florida Panthers	5–8–2–0	12	W
16	November 10, 2000	1–3	@ Tampa Bay Lightning	5–9–2–0	12	L
17	November 11, 2000	0–2	@ Dallas Stars	5–10–2–0	12	L
18	November 14, 2000	0–1	Tampa Bay Lightning	5–11–2–0	12	L
19	November 17, 2000	3–4	@ Washington Capitals	5–12–2–0	12	L
20	November 18, 2000	1–6	Toronto Maple Leafs	5–13–2–0	12	L
21	November 21, 2000	1–4	Florida Panthers	5–14–2–0	12	L
22	November 23, 2000	6–0	@ Atlanta Thrashers	6–14–2–0	14	W
23	November 25, 2000	3–5	Buffalo Sabres	6–15–2–0	14	L
24	November 27, 2000	3–2	Atlanta Thrashers	7–15–2–0	16	W
25	November 29, 2000	3–2	@ Edmonton Oilers	8–15–2–0	18	W
26	November 30, 2000	4–3	@ Vancouver Canucks	9–15–2–0	20	W

December: 1–8–2–2 (home: 1–5–1–0; road: 0–3–1–2)

Game	Date	Score	Opponent	Record	Points	Recap
27	December 2, 2000	1–1 OT	@ Calgary Flames	9–15–3–0	21	T
28	December 5, 2000	2–3	Buffalo Sabres	9–16–3–0	21	L
29	December 8, 2000	0–1	@ Ottawa Senators	9–17–3–0	21	L
30	December 9, 2000	2–4	Ottawa Senators	9–18–3–0	21	L
31	December 13, 2000	1–3	Calgary Flames	9–19–3–0	21	L
32	December 15, 2000	1–2	@ New Jersey Devils	9–20–3–0	21	L
33	December 16, 2000	4–4 OT	Pittsburgh Penguins	9–20–4–0	22	T
34	December 18, 2000	0–2	Columbus Blue Jackets	9–21–4–0	22	L
35	December 21, 2000	4–2	Nashville Predators	10–21–4–0	24	W
36	December 23, 2000	2–5	Toronto Maple Leafs	10–22–4–0	24	L
37	December 27, 2000	2–3	@ Vancouver Canucks	10–23–4–0	24	L
38	December 30, 2000	2–3 OT	@ Edmonton Oilers	10–23–4–1	25	OTL
39	December 31, 2000	4–5 OT	@ Calgary Flames	10–23–4–2	26	OTL

January: 7–5–1–1 (home: 4–2–1–1; road: 3–3–0–0)

Game	Date	Score	Opponent	Record	Points	Recap
40	January 2, 2001	3–0	@ New York Islanders	11–23–4–2	28	W
41	January 5, 2001	4–3	@ Pittsburgh Penguins	12–23–4–2	30	W
42	January 6, 2001	3–4	@ Ottawa Senators	12–24–4–2	30	L
43	January 10, 2001	1–2	Boston Bruins	12–25–4–2	30	L
44	January 12, 2001	3–0	@ Atlanta Thrashers	13–25–4–2	32	W
45	January 13, 2001	5–2	Phoenix Coyotes	14–25–4–2	34	W
46	January 16, 2001	2–3 OT	Carolina Hurricanes	14–25–4–3	35	OTL
47	January 18, 2001	3–1	Tampa Bay Lightning	15–25–4–3	37	W
48	January 20, 2001	2–2 OT	New York Rangers	15–25–5–3	38	T
49	January 23, 2001	2–5	St. Louis Blues	15–26–5–3	38	L
50	January 24, 2001	1–3	@ Pittsburgh Penguins	15–27–5–3	38	L
51	January 27, 2001	4–2	Washington Capitals	16–27–5–3	40	W
52	January 28, 2001	4–1	Ottawa Senators	17–27–5–3	42	W
53	January 31, 2001	2–4	@ New York Rangers	17–28–5–3	42	L

February: 5–6–0–1 (home: 2–3–0–1; road: 3–3–0–0)

Game	Date	Score	Opponent	Record	Points	Recap
54	February 1, 2001	3–0	@ Boston Bruins	18–28–5–3	44	W
55	February 6, 2001	0–4	New Jersey Devils	18–29–5–3	44	L
56	February 10, 2001	5–3	New York Islanders	19–29–5–3	46	W
57	February 11, 2001	4–3	@ Buffalo Sabres	20–29–5–3	48	W
58	February 13, 2001	2–3 OT	Colorado Avalanche	20–29–5–4	49	OTL
59	February 17, 2001	3–6	Washington Capitals	20–30–5–4	49	L
60	February 18, 2001	0–4	@ Ottawa Senators	20–31–5–4	49	L
61	February 21, 2001	1–2	Vancouver Canucks	20–32–5–4	49	L
62	February 23, 2001	1–3	@ Washington Capitals	20–33–5–4	49	L
63	February 24, 2001	1–5	@ Toronto Maple Leafs	20–34–5–4	49	L
64	February 27, 2001	3–2	@ Philadelphia Flyers	21–34–5–4	51	W
65	February 28, 2001	4–2	Pittsburgh Penguins	22–34–5–4	53	W

March: 5–5–3–1 (home: 2–2–1–0; road: 3–3–2–1)

Game	Date	Score	Opponent	Record	Points	Recap
66	March 3, 2001	3–1	Philadelphia Flyers	23–34–5–4	55	W
67	March 6, 2001	3–4	@ Los Angeles Kings	23–35–5–4	55	L
68	March 7, 2001	2–4	@ Mighty Ducks of Anaheim	23–36–5–4	55	L
69	March 10, 2001	3–3 OT	@ Phoenix Coyotes	23–36–6–4	56	T
70	March 12, 2001	0–3	@ San Jose Sharks	23–37–6–4	56	L
71	March 14, 2001	6–3	@ Carolina Hurricanes	24–37–6–4	58	W
72	March 17, 2001	2–3	Boston Bruins	24–38–6–4	58	L
73	March 20, 2001	3–3 OT	Florida Panthers	24–38–7–4	59	T
74	March 22, 2001	2–3 OT	@ Boston Bruins	24–38–7–5	60	OTL
75	March 24, 2001	2–3	Atlanta Thrashers	24–39–7–5	60	L
76	March 26, 2001	4–2	@ Carolina Hurricanes	25–39–7–5	62	W
77	March 28, 2001	2–2 OT	@ Florida Panthers	25–39–8–5	63	T
78	March 29, 2001	6–2	@ Tampa Bay Lightning	26–39–8–5	65	W
79	March 31, 2001	4–1	Toronto Maple Leafs	27–39–8–5	67	W

April: 1–1–0–1 (home: 1–1–0–0; road: 0–0–0–1)

Game	Date	Score	Opponent	Record	Points	Recap
80	April 2, 2001	2–3 OT	@ Boston Bruins	27–39–8–6	68	OTL
81	April 5, 2001	3–2 OT	Philadelphia Flyers	28–39–8–6	70	W
82	April 7, 2001	0–2	New Jersey Devils	28–40–8–6	70	L

Legend: W Win (2 points) L Loss (0 points) T Tie (1 point) OTL Overtime loss (1 point)

== Player statistics ==
=== Scoring ===
- Position abbreviations: C = Centre; D = Defence; G = Goaltender; LW = Left wing; RW = Right wing
- † = Joined team via a transaction (e.g., trade, waivers, signing) during the season. Stats reflect time with the Canadiens only.
- ‡ = Left team via a transaction (e.g., trade, waivers, release) during the season. Stats reflect time with the Canadiens only.

No.	Player	Pos	Regular season					
No.	Player	Pos	GP	G	A	Pts	+/-	PIM
11	Saku Koivu	C	54	17	30	47	2	40
32	Oleg Petrov	RW	81	17	30	47	−11	24
49	Brian Savage	LW	62	21	24	45	−13	26
26	Martin Rucinsky	LW	57	16	22	38	−5	66
43	Patrice Brisebois	D	77	15	21	36	−31	28
14	Trevor Linden‡	RW	57	12	21	33	−2	52
63	Craig Darby	C	78	12	16	28	−17	16
25	Chad Kilger†	LW	43	9	16	25	−1	34
22	Eric Weinrich‡	D	60	6	19	25	−1	34
15	Dainius Zubrus‡	C	49	12	12	24	−7	30
79	Andrei Markov	D	63	6	17	23	−6	18
8	Jim Campbell	RW	57	9	11	20	−3	53
37	Patrick Poulin	C	52	9	11	20	1	13
28	Karl Dykhuis	D	67	8	9	17	9	44
17	Benoit Brunet	LW	35	3	11	14	−4	12
56	Stephane Robidas	D	65	6	6	12	0	14
78	Eric Landry	C	51	4	7	11	−9	43
44	Sheldon Souray	D	52	3	8	11	−11	95
34	Sergei Zholtok‡	C	32	1	10	11	−15	8
20	Richard Zednik†	RW	12	3	6	9	−2	10
47	Juha Lind	C	47	3	4	7	−4	4
51	Francis Bouillon	D	29	0	6	6	3	26
88	Xavier Delisle	C	14	3	2	5	−5	6
45	Arron Asham	RW	46	2	3	5	−9	59
54	Patrick Traverse†	D	19	2	3	5	−8	10
38	Jan Bulis†	C	12	0	5	5	−1	0
40	Eric Chouinard	LW	13	1	3	4	0	0
52	Craig Rivet	D	26	1	2	3	−8	36
20	P. J. Stock‡	C	20	1	2	3	−1	32
35	Andrei Bashkirov	LW	18	0	3	3	−2	0
24	Christian Laflamme	D	39	0	3	3	−11	42
55	Matthieu Descoteaux	D	5	1	1	2	−2	4
39	Johan Witehall†	LW	26	1	1	2	0	6
29	Gino Odjick†	RW	13	1	0	1	0	44
60	Jose Theodore	G	59	1	0	1		6
31	Jeff Hackett	G	19	0	1	1		0
29	Darryl Shannon‡	D	7	0	1	1	−4	6
23	Francis Belanger†	LW	10	0	0	0	−3	29
83	Eric Bertrand	LW	3	0	0	0	0	0
39	Enrico Ciccone‡	D	3	0	0	0	−1	14
41	Eric Fichaud	G	2	0	0	0		0
30	Mathieu Garon	G	11	0	0	0		0
46	Matt Higgins	C	6	0	0	0	−2	2
71	Mike Ribeiro	C	2	0	0	0	0	2
38	Barry Richter	D	2	0	0	0	−1	2
61	Jason Ward	RW	12	0	0	0	3	12

=== Goaltending ===
No.	Player	Regular season									
No.	Player	GP	W	L	T	SA	GA	GAA	SV%	SO	TOI
60	Jose Theodore	59	20	29	5	1546	141	2.57	.909	2	3298
30	Mathieu Garon	11	4	5	1	233	24	2.44	.897	2	589
31	Jeff Hackett	19	4	10	2	477	54	3.25	.887	0	998
41	Eric Fichaud	2	0	2	0	32	4	3.87	.875	0	62

== Awards and records ==
=== Awards ===
Type	Award/honour	Recipient	Ref
League (in-season)	NHL Player of the Week	Trevor Linden (October 23)	
Team	Jacques Beauchamp Molson Trophy	Oleg Petrov	
Team	Molson Cup	Jose Theodore	

=== Milestones ===
Milestone	Player	Date	Ref
First game	Mathieu Garon	October 6, 2000	
First game	Andrei Markov	October 6, 2000	
First game	Eric Chouinard	January 16, 2001	
First game	Matthieu Descoteaux	February 11, 2001	
First game	Francis Belanger	February 17, 2001	

== Transactions ==
The Canadiens were involved in the following transactions from June 11, 2000, the day after the deciding game of the 2000 Stanley Cup Final, through June 9, 2001, the day of the deciding game of the 2001 Stanley Cup Final.

=== Trades ===
Date	Details		Ref
June 23, 2000	To Montreal Canadiens: Future considerations (Note: Columbus agreed to select Frederic Chabot in the expansion draft.)	To Columbus Blue Jackets: 2nd-round pick in 2001	
June 24, 2000	To Montreal Canadiens: 3rd-round pick in 2000; 4th-round pick in 2000; 5th-round pick in 2000	To Anaheim Mighty Ducks: 2nd-round pick in 2000	
June 25, 2000	To Montreal Canadiens: 4th-round pick in 2000	To Pittsburgh Penguins: 4th-round pick in 2000; 5th-round pick in 2000	
June 25, 2000	To Montreal Canadiens: 6th-round pick in 2000	To Buffalo Sabres: 5th-round pick in 2001	
December 7, 2000	To Montreal Canadiens: Gino Odjick	To Philadelphia Flyers: P. J. Stock; 6th-round pick in 2001	
December 18, 2000	To Montreal Canadiens: Chad Kilger	To Edmonton Oilers: Sergei Zholtok	
February 21, 2001	To Montreal Canadiens: Patrick Traverse	To Boston Bruins: Eric Weinrich	
March 13, 2001	To Montreal Canadiens: Jan Bulis; Richard Zednik; 1st-round pick in 2001	To Washington Capitals: Trevor Linden; Dainius Zubrus; New Jersey’s 2nd-round pick in 2001	

=== Players acquired ===
Date	Player	Former team	Term	Via	Ref
July 7, 2000	Eric Bertrand	Nashville Predators	1-year	Free agency	
July 7, 2000	Sylvain Blouin	St. Louis Blues	2-year	Free agency	
July 7, 2000	Enrico Ciccone	Essen Mosquitoes (DEL)	1-year	Free agency	
July 7, 2000	Eric Landry	San Jose Sharks	1-year	Free agency	
July 7, 2000	P. J. Stock	New York Rangers	1-year (Note: Club option for a second year.)	Free agency	
August 8, 2000	Xavier Delisle	Tampa Bay Lightning	1-year	Free agency	
August 22, 2000	Jim Campbell	St. Louis Blues	1-year	Free agency	
September 17, 2000	Darryl Shannon	Calgary Flames	1-year	Free agency	
January 12, 2001	Johan Witehall	New York Rangers		Waivers	
February 15, 2001	Francis Belanger	Quebec Citadelles (AHL)	2-year	Free agency	
April 11, 2001	Benoit Gratton	Calgary Flames		Waivers	

=== Players lost ===
Date	Player	New team	Via (Note: In parentheses is the player's free agency group on July 1 if applicable.)	Ref
June 23, 2000	Frederic Chabot	Columbus Blue Jackets	Expansion draft	
June 23, 2000	Turner Stevenson	Columbus Blue Jackets	Expansion draft	
July 1, 2000	Byron Briske (Note: Briske retired.)		Contract expiration (UFA)	
July 1, 2000	Boyd Olson (Note: Olson retired.)		Contract expiration (UFA)	
July 4, 2000	Shayne Corson	Toronto Maple Leafs	Free agency (III)	
July 5, 2000	Jim Cummins	Anaheim Mighty Ducks	Free agency (UFA)	
July 27, 2000	Jesse Belanger	New York Islanders	Free agency (UFA)	
August 14, 2000	Scott Lachance	Vancouver Canucks	Free agency (UFA)	
September 9, 2000	Dave Morissette	Lake Charles Ice Pirates (WPHL)	Free agency (UFA)	
September 20, 2000	Trent McCleary		Retirement	
September 29, 2000	Sylvain Blouin	Minnesota Wild	Waiver draft	
N/A	Jonathan Delisle	Quebec Citadelles (AHL)	Free agency (UFA)	
December 8, 2000	Enrico Ciccone		Retirement	
May 22, 2001	Johan Witehall	EHC Chur (NLA)	Free agency	
June 6, 2001	Juha Lind	Sodertalje SK (SHL)	Free agency	

=== Signings ===
Date	Player	Term	Contract type	Ref
July 7, 2000	Saku Koivu	1-year	Re-signing	
July 7, 2000	Patrick Poulin	3-year	Re-signing	
July 14, 2000	Andrei Markov		Entry-level	
August 1, 2000	Andrei Bashkirov	1-year	Re-signing	
August 1, 2000	Matt Higgins	1-year	Re-signing	
August 1, 2000	Mike McBain	1-year	Re-signing	
August 1, 2000	Brian Savage	1-year	Re-signing	
August 8, 2000	Craig Darby	1-year	Re-signing	
August 29, 2000	Trent McCleary	1-year	Re-signing	
September 1, 2000	Matthieu Descoteaux	1-year	Re-signing	
September 1, 2000	Stephane Robidas	1-year	Re-signing	
September 4, 2000	Sheldon Souray	2-year	Re-signing	
September 6, 2000	Martin Rucinsky	1-year	Re-signing	
September 7, 2000	Dainius Zubrus	2-year	Re-signing	
September 20, 2000	Craig Rivet	2-year	Re-signing	
October 3, 2000	Jose Theodore	2-year	Re-signing	
March 29, 2001	Ron Hainsey	3-year	Entry-level	
May 4, 2001	Oleg Petrov	2-year (Note: Option for a third year.)	Extension	
May 23, 2001	Patrick Traverse	3-year	Extension	
May 30, 2001	Patrice Brisebois	1-year	Extension	
May 30, 2001	Marc-Andre Thinel	3-year	Entry-level	
June 1, 2001	Jerome Marois	3-year	Entry-level	
June 4, 2001	Gino Odjick	2-year (Note: Club option for a third year.)	Extension	

== Draft picks ==
Montreal's draft picks at the 2000 NHL entry draft held at the Pengrowth Saddledome in Calgary, Alberta.

Round	#	Player	Nationality	College/Junior/Club team (League)
1	13	Ron Hainsey	United States	University of Massachusetts Lowell (Hockey East)
1	16	Marcel Hossa	Slovakia	Portland Winterhawks (WHL)
3	78	Jozef Balej	Slovakia	Portland Winterhawks (WHL)
3	79	Tyler Hanchuck	Canada	Brampton Battalion (OHL)
4	109	Johan Eneqvist	Sweden	Leksands IF Jr. (Sweden)
4	114	Christian Larrivee	Canada	Chicoutimi Saguenéens (QMJHL)
5	145	Ryan Glenn	Canada	Walpole Jr. Stars (EJHL)
6	172	Scott Selig	United States	Thayer Academy (USHS-MA)
6	182	Petr Chvojka	Czech Republic	HC Plzeň Jr. (Czech Republic)
8	243	Joni Puurula	Finland	Hermes Mestis (Finland)
9	275	Jonathan Gauthier	Canada	Rouyn-Noranda Huskies (QMJHL)

== See also ==
- 2000–01 NHL season
