= Éric Fichaud =

Canadian ice hockey player (born 1975)

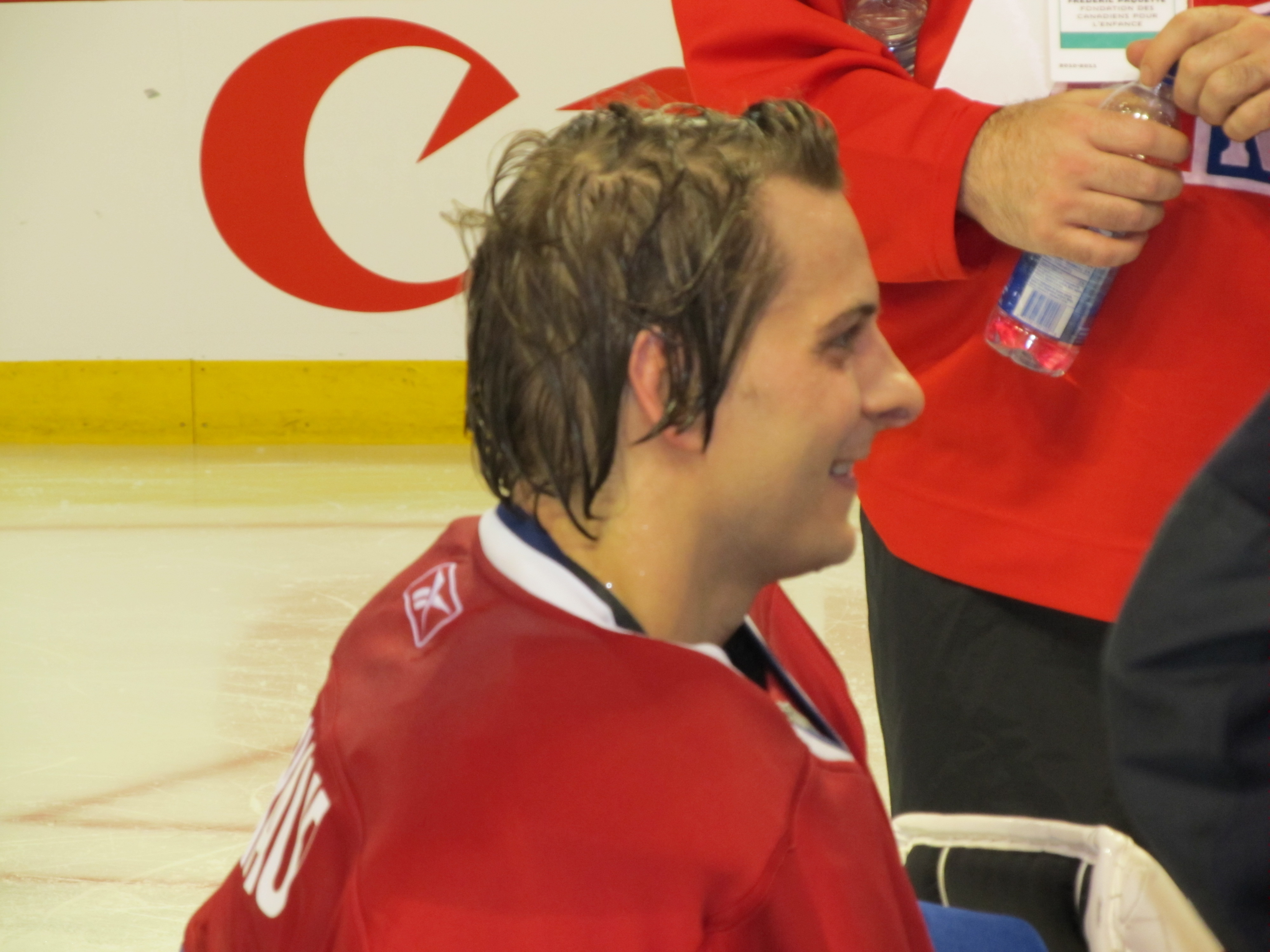
- Fichaud in 2010
- Born: November 4, 1975 (age 50) Anjou, Quebec, Canada
- Height: 5 ft 11 in (180 cm)
- Weight: 171 lb (78 kg; 12 st 3 lb)
- Position: Goaltender
- Caught: Left
- Played for: New York Islanders; Nashville Predators; Carolina Hurricanes; Montreal Canadiens; Krefeld Pinguine
- NHL draft: 16th overall, 1994; Toronto Maple Leafs
- Playing career: 1995–2008

Éric Joseph Fichaud (born November 4, 1975) is a Canadian former professional ice hockey goaltender. He played 95 games in the National Hockey League with four teams between 1996 and 2000. He was selected in the first round of the 1994 NHL entry draft, 16th overall, by the Toronto Maple Leafs.

== Junior career ==
Fichaud played net for the Chicoutimi Saguenéens in the Quebec Major Junior Hockey League. In 1994, he led his team to the Memorial Cup, winning a host of awards, including the Hap Emms Memorial Trophy as top goaltender and playoff MVP awards. A classic butterfly goaltender in the Patrick Roy mold, Fichaud looked to be a future National Hockey League starting netminder.

== Professional career ==
Shortly after being drafted, Fichaud was traded to the New York Islanders for Benoît Hogue, a 1995 3rd round pick (Ryan Pepperall) and a 1996 5th round pick (Brandon Sugden), without ever playing a game for Toronto. Fichaud never lived up to the lofty expectations his fantastic junior career had led to, bouncing between the minor leagues and the NHL. Shoulder injuries played a key role, and despite Fichaud's best efforts, he was unable to recapture his previous form. Eventually, Fichaud settled into the role as the starting goalie for the AHL's Hamilton Bulldogs.

== Career statistics ==
=== Regular season and playoffs ===
			Regular season									Playoffs
Season	Team	League	GP	W	L	T	MIN	GA	SO	GAA	SV%	GP	W	L	MIN	GA	SO	GAA	SV%
1991–92	Montreal-Bourassa Canadiens	QMAAA	28	12	15	1	1678	110	0	3.95	—	9	5	4	567	32	0	3.39	—
1992–93	Chicoutimi Sagueneens	QMJHL	43	18	13	1	2039	149	0	4.38	.864	—	—	—	—	—	—	—	—
1993–94	Chicoutimi Sagueneens	QMJHL	63	37	21	3	3493	192	4	3.30	.899	26	16	10	1560	86	1	3.31	.892
1993–94	Chicoutimi Sagueneens	M-Cup	—	—	—	—	—	—	—	—	—	4	2	2	240	10	1	2.50	—
1994–95	Chicoutimi Sagueneens	QMJHL	46	21	19	4	2637	151	4	3.44	.898	7	2	5	428	20	0	2.80	.909
1995–96	New York Islanders	NHL	24	7	12	2	1234	68	1	3.31	.897	—	—	—	—	—	—	—	—
1995–96	Worcester IceCats	AHL	34	13	15	6	1989	97	1	2.93	.913	2	1	1	127	7	0	3.30	.883
1996–97	New York Islanders	NHL	34	9	14	4	1760	91	0	3.10	.899	—	—	—	—	—	—	—	—
1997–98	New York Islanders	NHL	17	3	8	3	807	40	0	2.97	.905	—	—	—	—	—	—	—	—
1997–98	Utah Grizzlies	IHL	1	0	0	0	40	3	0	4.45	.870	—	—	—	—	—	—	—	—
1998–99	Nashville Predators	NHL	9	0	6	0	448	24	0	3.22	.895	—	—	—	—	—	—	—	—
1998–99	Milwaukee Admirals	IHL	8	5	2	1	480	25	0	3.13	.905	—	—	—	—	—	—	—	—
1999–00	Carolina Hurricanes	NHL	9	3	5	1	490	24	1	2.94	.883	—	—	—	—	—	—	—	—
1999–00	Quebec Citadelles	AHL	6	4	1	1	368	17	0	2.77	.910	3	0	3	177	10	0	3.39	.921
2000–01	Montreal Canadiens	NHL	2	0	2	0	62	4	0	3.89	.875	—	—	—	—	—	—	—	—
2000–01	Quebec Citadelles	AHL	42	19	19	2	2441	127	1	3.12	.913	2	0	1	98	3	0	1.84	.955
2001–02	Manitoba Moose	AHL	5	2	3	0	279	13	1	2.80	.903	—	—	—	—	—	—	—	—
2001–02	Krefeld Pinguine	DEL	9	—	—	—	401	11	0	1.65	.944	3	—	—	197	8	0	2.44	.922
2002–03	Hamilton Bulldogs	AHL	27	14	7	3	1447	55	4	2.28	.925	8	5	3	472	17	0	2.16	.917
2003–04	Hamilton Bulldogs	AHL	31	16	11	3	1836	70	1	2.29	.917	—	—	—	—	—	—	—	—
2004–05	Radio X de Quebec	LNAH	9	6	2	0	505	19	—	2.26	.924	8	8	0	480	9	—	1.13	—
2005–06	Radio X de Quebec	LNAH	41	—	—	—	—	—	—	—	—	—	—	—	—	—	—	—	—
2006–07	Radio X de Quebec	LNAH	44	—	—	—	—	—	—	—	—	—	—	—	—	—	—	—	—
2007–08	CRS Express de Saint-Georges	LNAH	34	—	—	—	—	—	—	—	—	—	—	—	—	—	—	—	—
NHL totals			95	22	47	10	4799	251	2	3.14	.897	—	—	—	—	—	—	—	—

Preceded by Landon Wilson	Toronto Maple Leafs first-round draft pick 1994	Succeeded by Jeff Ware
