= Alexandre Tremblay =

Canadian ice hockey player (born 1979)

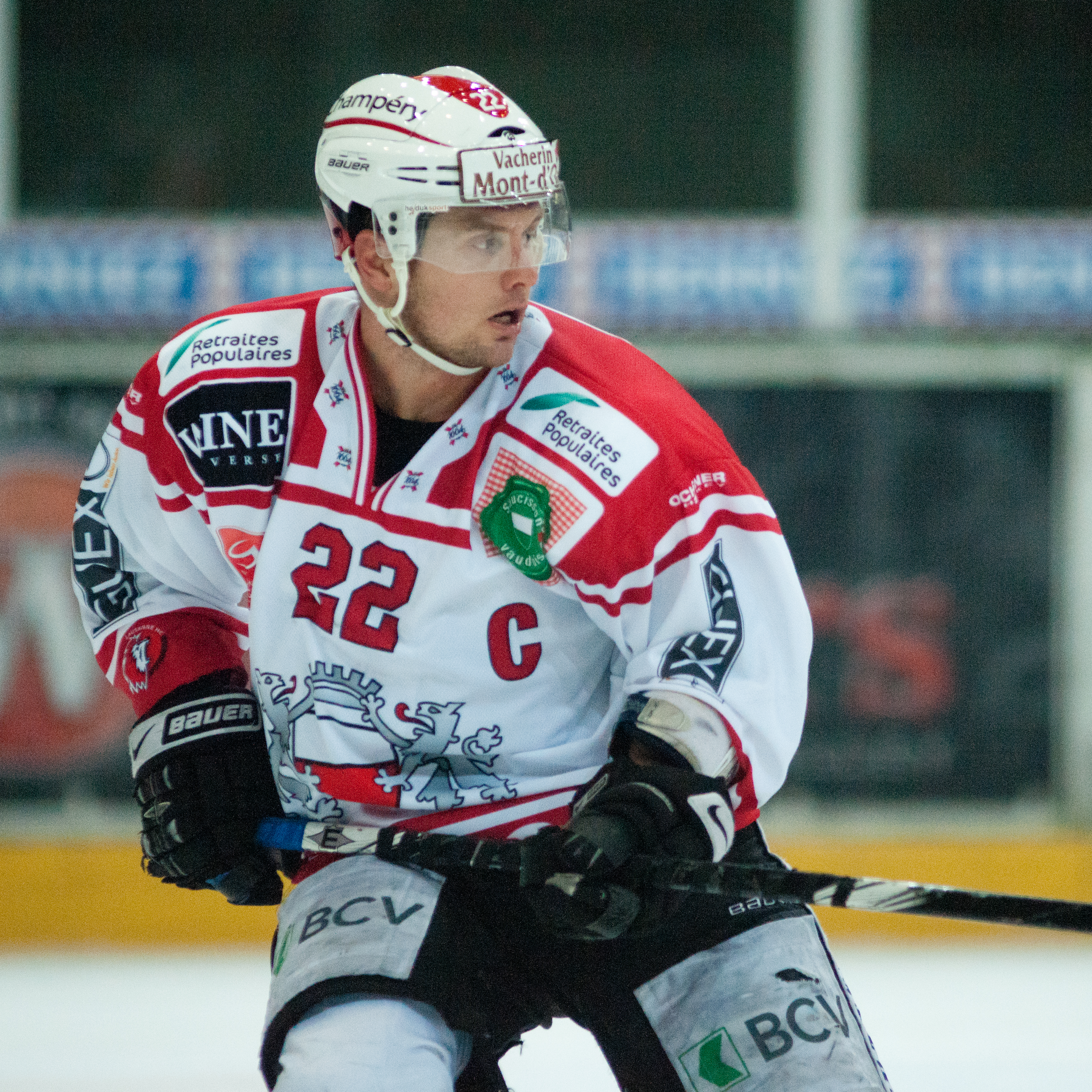
- Born: March 22, 1979 (age 47) Beaupré, Quebec, Canada
- Height: 5 ft 9 in (175 cm)
- Weight: 187 lb (85 kg; 13 st 5 lb)
- Position: Left wing
- Shoots: Left
- LNAH team Former teams: Thetford Assurancia; AHL; Syracuse Crunch; SM-liiga; JYP Jyväskylä; NLA; HC Fribourg-Gottéron; HC Genève-Servette; ZSC Lions; NLB; HC La Chaux-de-Fonds; EHC Biel; Lausanne HC; EHC Visp; EHC Basel Sharks
- NHL draft: Undrafted
- Playing career: 2003–present

Alexandre Tremblay (born March 22, 1979) is a Canadian professional ice hockey player who is currently playing with the Thetford Assurancia in the Ligue Nord-Américaine de Hockey (LNAH).

== Playing career ==
While attending Université du Québec à Trois-Rivières, Tremblay played for the UQTR Patriotes from 2000–01 to 2002–03. The Patriotes reached the national CIAU University Cup championship final in all three of his seasons, winning in 2001 and 2003. Tremblay won the Major W.J. "Danny" McLeod Award in 2001, as Most Valuable Player of the national championship tournament.

In Switzerland, he was promoted to National League A with EHC Biel in 2008 and captained Lausanne HC in the National League B, with whom he played from 2008 to 2011, reaching the promotion-relegation game twice against his former team Biel. Both events were heartbreaking defeats for LHC and Tremblay. He left Lausanne for EHC Visp in 2011 after a very disappointing season that saw LHC lose in the National League B final to Visp 4-0. He joined the GCK Lions in December 2012. He had brief stints in National League A with Fribourg-Gottéron, Genève-Servette and ZSC Lions, without being able to establish himself in the elite Swiss league.

== Career statistics ==
			Regular season					Playoffs
Season	Team	League	GP	G	A	Pts	PIM	GP	G	A	Pts	PIM
1995–96	Sainte-Foy Gouverneurs	QMAAA	41	31	29	60	—	14	9	12	21	—
1996–97	Laval Titan	QMJHL	27	3	6	9	46	—	—	—	—	—
1996–97	Shawinigan Cataractes	QMJHL	20	5	9	14	10	7	0	0	0	14
1997–98	Shawinigan Cataractes	QMJHL	65	39	37	76	90	6	1	2	3	30
1998–99	Shawinigan Cataractes	QMJHL	70	47	48	95	96	6	1	6	7	8
1999–00	Shawinigan Cataractes	QMJHL	47	31	31	62	63	—	—	—	—	—
1999–00	Rimouski Océanic	QMJHL	17	12	10	22	30	14	9	10	19	32
2000–01	UQTR Patriotes	CIS	24	29	24	53	56
2001–02	UQTR Patriotes	CIS	24	17	19	36	58
2002–03	UQTR Patriotes	CIS	25	38	29	67	62	—	—	—	—	—
2002–03	Syracuse Crunch	AHL	5	0	2	2	2	—	—	—	—	—
2003–04	JYP Jyväskylä	SM-liiga	32	10	1	11	8	2	0	0	0	0
2004–05	Québec Radio X	LNAH	59	50	36	86	115	14	12	9	21	18
2004–05	Charlevoix Caron & Guay	QSCHL	3	1	1	2	0	—	—	—	—	—
2005–06	HC La Chaux-de-Fonds	NLB	42	25	30	55	72	—	—	—	—	—
2005–06	HC Fribourg-Gottéron	NLA	1	0	0	0	0	—	—	—	—	—
2006–07	EHC Biel	NLB	45	43	33	76	72	20	18	14	32	38
2007–08	EHC Biel	NLB	40	38	30	68	46	7	3	2	5	24
2008–09	Lausanne HC	NLB	13	9	12	21	22	23	18	19	37	52
2009–10	Lausanne HC	NLB	37	26	25	51	54	11	6	6	12	16
2009–10	Genève-Servette HC	NLA	2	2	1	3	0	—	—	—	—	—
2010–11	Lausanne HC	NLB	38	21	28	49	79	12	8	7	15	26
2011–12	EHC Visp	NLB	25	14	13	27	58	3	2	1	3	2
2012–13	EHC Visp	NLB	15	16	14	30	12	—	—	—	—	—
2012–13	GCK Lions	NLB	17	14	8	22	67	4	1	3	4	6
2012–13	ZSC Lions	NLA	1	0	0	0	0	5	0	2	2	0
2013–14	GCK Lions	NLB	32	18	12	30	26	—	—	—	—	—
2013–14	EHC Basel Sharks	NLB	4	1	3	4	6	1	0	0	0	0
AHL totals			5	0	2	2	2	—	—	—	—	—
NLA totals			4	2	1	3	0	5	0	2	2	0
NLB totals			308	225	208	433	514	81	56	52	108	164

== Awards and honours ==
Award	Year
CIS Rookie of the Year	2002–03
CIS Player of the year	2002–03
