= Éric Charron =

Canadian ice hockey player (born 1970)

- Born: January 14, 1970 (age 56) Verdun, Quebec, Canada
- Height: 6 ft 0 in (183 cm)
- Weight: 194 lb (88 kg; 13 st 12 lb)
- Position: Defence
- Shot: Left
- Played for: Montreal Canadiens; Tampa Bay Lightning; Washington Capitals; Calgary Flames; Adler Mannheim (DEL); Nottingham Panthers (BISL); HC Sibir Novosibirsk (RSL)
- NHL draft: 20th overall, 1988; Montreal Canadiens
- Playing career: 1988–2007

Joseph René Éric Charron (born January 14, 1970) is a Canadian former professional ice hockey defenceman who played parts of eight seasons in the National Hockey League (NHL) for the Montreal Canadiens, Tampa Bay Lightning, Washington Capitals, and Calgary Flames.

== Playing career ==
Charron was born in Verdun, Quebec. As a youth, he played in the 1982 and 1983 Quebec International Pee-Wee Hockey Tournaments with a minor ice hockey team from Verdun. Originally drafted 20th overall in the 1988 NHL entry draft by the Montreal Canadiens, Charron has also played for the Tampa Bay Lightning, Washington Capitals and Calgary Flames. He also had spells in Germany, United Kingdom and Russia.

== Career statistics ==
			Regular season					Playoffs
Season	Team	League	GP	G	A	Pts	PIM	GP	G	A	Pts	PIM
1986–87	Lac St-Louis Lions	QMAAA	41	1	8	9	92	2	0	2	2	2
1987–88	Trois-Rivières Draveurs	QMJHL	67	3	13	16	135	—	—	—	—	—
1988–89	Trois-Rivières Draveurs	QMJHL	38	2	16	18	111	—	—	—	—	—
1988–89	Verdun Junior Canadiens	QMJHL	28	2	15	17	66	—	—	—	—	—
1988–89	Sherbrooke Canadiens	AHL	1	0	0	0	0	—	—	—	—	—
1989–90	Saint-Hyacinthe Laser	QMJHL	68	13	38	51	152	11	3	4	7	57
1989–90	Sherbrooke Canadiens	AHL	—	—	—	—	—	2	0	0	0	0
1990–91	Fredericton Canadiens	AHL	71	1	11	12	108	2	1	0	1	29
1991–92	Fredericton Canadiens	AHL	59	2	11	13	98	6	1	0	1	4
1992–93	Montreal Canadiens	NHL	3	0	0	0	2	—	—	—	—	—
1992–93	Fredericton Canadiens	AHL	54	3	13	16	93	—	—	—	—	—
1992–93	Atlanta Knights	IHL	11	0	2	2	12	3	0	1	1	6
1993–94	Atlanta Knights	IHL	66	5	18	23	144	14	1	4	5	28
1993–94	Tampa Bay Lightning	NHL	4	0	0	0	2	—	—	—	—	—
1994–95	Tampa Bay Lightning	NHL	45	1	4	5	26	—	—	—	—	—
1995–96	Tampa Bay Lightning	NHL	14	0	0	0	18	—	—	—	—	—
1995–96	Portland Pirates	AHL	45	0	8	8	88	20	1	1	2	33
1995–96	Washington Capitals	NHL	4	0	1	1	4	6	0	0	0	8
1996–97	Portland Pirates	AHL	29	6	8	14	55	5	0	3	3	0
1996–97	Washington Capitals	NHL	25	1	1	2	20	—	—	—	—	—
1997–98	Saint John Flames	AHL	56	8	20	28	136	20	1	7	8	55
1997–98	Calgary Flames	NHL	2	0	0	0	4	—	—	—	—	—
1998–99	Saint John Flames	AHL	50	10	12	22	148	3	1	0	1	22
1998–99	Calgary Flames	NHL	12	0	1	1	14	—	—	—	—	—
1999–00	Saint John Flames	AHL	37	2	15	17	82	—	—	—	—	—
1999–00	Calgary Flames	NHL	21	0	0	0	37	—	—	—	—	—
2000–01	Cleveland Lumberjacks	IHL	60	9	10	19	99	—	—	—	—	—
2001–02	Adler Mannheim	DEL	46	1	7	8	118	12	0	1	1	34
2002–03	Nottingham Panthers	BISL	32	2	7	9	80	15	0	2	2	16
2003–04	Sibir Novosibirsk	RSL	41	0	4	4	88	—	—	—	—	—
2004–05	Laval Chiefs	LNAH	22	0	8	8	12	—	—	—	—	—
2004–05	Verdun Dragons	LNAH	18	0	9	9	42	4	0	1	1	13
2005–06	Verdun Dragons	LNAH	46	10	12	22	65	4	0	0	0	4
2006–07	St. Hyacinthe Top Design	LNAH	36	2	6	8	98	5	0	3	3	10
AHL totals			402	32	98	130	808	58	5	11	16	143
NHL totals			130	2	7	9	127	6	0	0	0	8

Preceded by Mark Pederson	Montreal Canadiens first-round draft pick 1988	Succeeded by Lindsay Vallis
