= Christian Proulx =

Canadian ice hockey player

- Born: December 10, 1973 (age 51); Coaticook, Quebec, Canada
- Height: 6 ft 0 in (183 cm)
- Weight: 185 lb (84 kg; 13 st 3 lb)
- Position: Defense
- Shot: Left
- Played for: Montreal Canadiens; Asiago; DEG Metro Stars
- NHL draft: 164th overall, 1992; Montreal Canadiens
- Playing career: 1993–2007

Christian Marcel Proulx (born December 10, 1973) is a Canadian former professional ice hockey defenceman. He played seven games in the National Hockey League for the Montreal Canadiens during the 1993–94 season. The rest of his career, which lasted from 1993 to 2007, was spent in the minor leagues and then in Europe.

== Career statistics ==
=== Regular season and playoffs ===
			Regular season					Playoffs
Season	Team	League	GP	G	A	Pts	PIM	GP	G	A	Pts	PIM
1988–89	Montreal L'est Cantonniers	QAAA	36	2	4	6	64	10	0	0	0	12
1989–90	Montreal L'est Cantonniers	QAAA	41	4	19	23	—	—	—	—	—	—
1990–91	Saint-Jean Lynx	QMJHL	67	1	8	9	73	—	—	—	—	—
1991–92	Saint-Jean Lynx	QMJHL	68	1	17	18	180	—	—	—	—	—
1992–93	Saint-Jean Lynx	QMJHL	70	3	34	37	147	4	0	0	0	12
1992–93	Fredericton Canadiens	AHL	2	1	0	1	2	4	0	0	0	0
1993–94	Fredericton Canadiens	AHL	70	2	12	14	183	—	—	—	—	—
1993–94	Montreal Canadiens	NHL	7	1	2	3	20	—	—	—	—	—
1994–95	Fredericton Canadiens	AHL	75	1	9	10	184	9	0	1	1	8
1995–96	San Francisco Spiders	IHL	80	1	15	16	154	4	0	0	0	6
1996–97	Milwaukee Admirals	IHL	74	3	4	7	145	1	0	0	0	2
1997–98	Hershey Bears	AHL	32	2	2	4	76	—	—	—	—	—
1997–98	Milwaukee Admirals	IHL	31	4	6	10	84	10	0	1	1	20
1998–99	Asiago	ALP	29	3	12	15	106	—	—	—	—	—
1998–99	Asiago	ITA	18	3	9	12	97	—	—	—	—	—
1999–00	EC Bad Tolz	GER-2	44	9	18	27	192	8	2	3	5	30
2000–01	EC Bad Tolz	GER-2	42	7	10	17	120	14	4	5	9	30
2001–02	DEG Metro Stars Düsseldorf	DEL	57	0	4	4	151	—	—	—	—	—
2002–03	Straubing Tigers	GER-2	54	3	15	18	132	3	1	0	1	4
2003–04	Thetford Mines Prolab	QSPHL	38	2	9	11	104	15	0	6	6	21
2004–05	Verdun Dragons	LNAH	40	2	9	11	64	—	—	—	—	—
2004–05	Laval Chiefs	LNAH	18	2	4	6	35	—	—	—	—	—
2005–06	Laval Chiefs	LNAH	56	3	22	25	94	—	—	—	—	—
2006–07	Saint-Jean Summum Chiefs	LNAH	48	4	10	14	123	—	—	—	—	—
NHL totals			7	1	2	3	20	—	—	—	—	—
