= Mathieu Biron =

Canadian ice hockey player (born 1980)

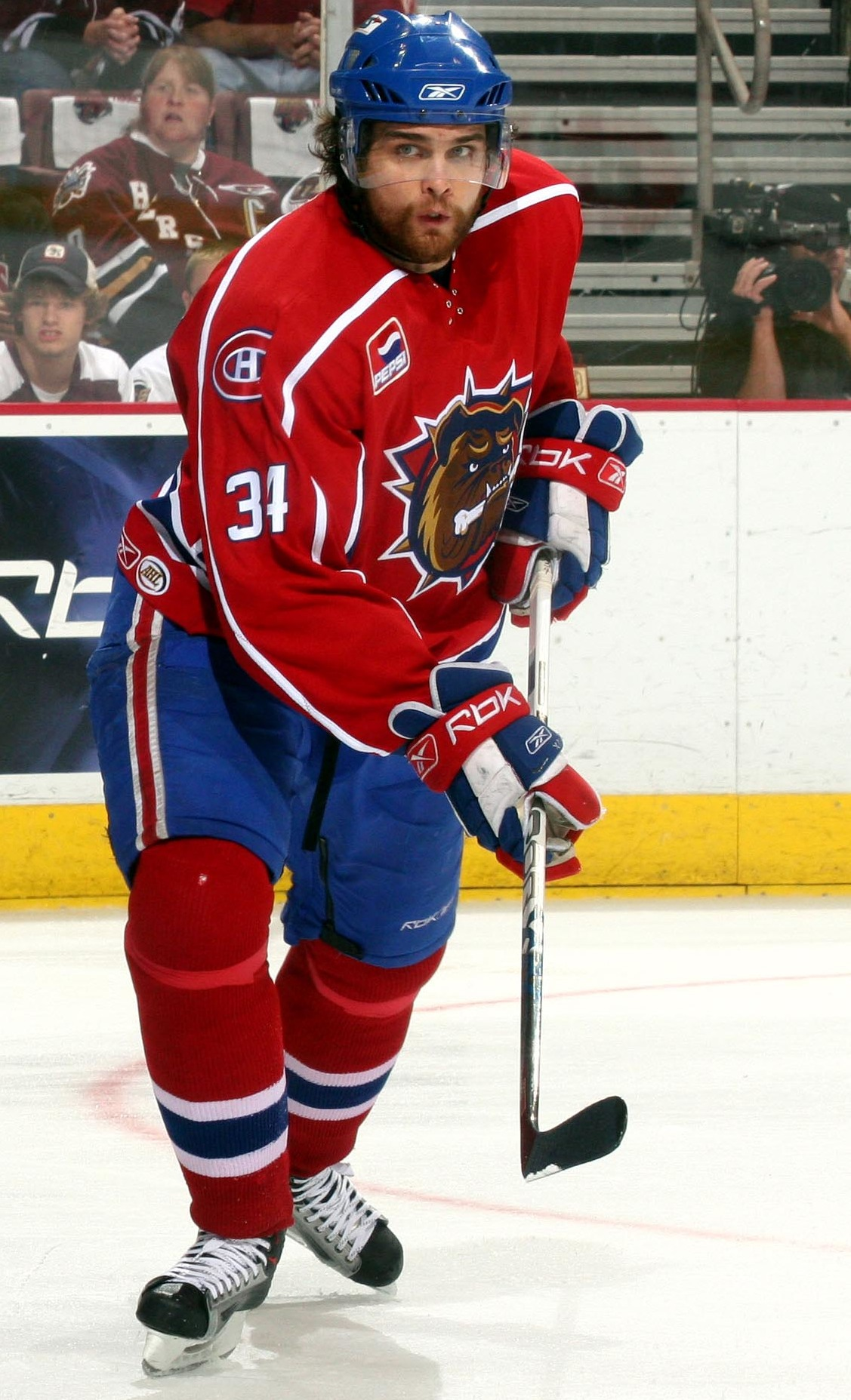
- Biron with the Hamilton Bulldogs in 2007
- Born: April 29, 1980 (age 46) Lac-Saint-Charles, Quebec, Canada
- Height: 6 ft 6 in (198 cm)
- Weight: 245 lb (111 kg; 17 st 7 lb)
- Position: Defence
- Shot: Right
- Played for: New York Islanders; Tampa Bay Lightning; Florida Panthers; Washington Capitals
- NHL draft: 21st overall, 1998; Los Angeles Kings
- Playing career: 1999–2012

Mathieu Biron (born April 29, 1980) is a Canadian former professional ice hockey player who played over 250 games in the National Hockey League (NHL). After retiring as a hockey player, he became a firefighter.

== Playing career ==
As a youth, Biron played in the 1994 Quebec International Pee-Wee Hockey Tournament with a minor ice hockey team from Charlesbourg, Quebec City. He was drafted by the National Hockey League's (NHL) Los Angeles Kings in the first round (twenty-first overall) of the 1998 NHL entry draft.

New York Islanders traded Žigmund Pálffy, Bryan Smolinski, Marcel Cousineau and 4th round selection (previously acquired from the New Jersey Devils - Daniel Johansson) in 1999 to the Los Angeles Kings for Olli Jokinen, Josh Green, Mathieu Biron and 1st round selection (Taylor Pyatt) in 1999.

On November 24, 2003, Biron became the first NHL player in 23 years to score a goal against his brother when he finished a 2-on-1 against older brother Martin, in a victory over the Buffalo Sabres.

Biron was traded to the Canadiens on December 15, 2006 via a trade with the San Jose Sharks for Patrick Traverse.

His last season in the NHL came in 2005-06, when he made 52 appearances for the Washington Capitals. He then spent two years in the AHL, playing for the Worcester Sharks and Hamilton Bulldogs.

Biron signed with the Frankfurt Lions of the German top-flight Deutsche Eishockey Liga (DEL) for the 2008-09 season and moved to fellow DEL team Hamburg Freezers for the 2009-10 campaign.

From 2010 to 2012 he turned out to conclude his playing career for Thetford Mines Isothermic in the LNAH.

== Personal ==
His older brother Martin Biron is a former goaltender who played 16 seasons in the NHL.

After his hockey career, Biron trained and studied to become a firefighter in Lévis, Quebec.

== Career statistics ==
=== Regular season and playoffs ===
			Regular season					Playoffs
Season	Team	League	GP	G	A	Pts	PIM	GP	G	A	Pts	PIM
1996–97	Ste-Foy Gouverneurs	QMAAA	40	4	22	26	49	10	3	4	7	—
1997–98	Shawinigan Cataractes	QMJHL	59	8	28	36	60	6	0	1	1	10
1998–99	Shawinigan Cataractes	QMJHL	69	13	32	45	116	6	0	2	2	6
1999–00	New York Islanders	NHL	60	4	4	8	38	—	—	—	—	—
2000–01	New York Islanders	NHL	14	0	1	1	12	—	—	—	—	—
2000–01	Lowell Lock Monsters	AHL	22	1	3	4	17	—	—	—	—	—
2000–01	Springfield Falcons	AHL	34	0	6	6	18	—	—	—	—	—
2001–02	Springfield Falcons	AHL	35	4	9	13	16	—	—	—	—	—
2001–02	Tampa Bay Lightning	NHL	36	0	0	0	12	—	—	—	—	—
2002–03	San Antonio Rampage	AHL	43	3	8	11	58	—	—	—	—	—
2002–03	Florida Panthers	NHL	34	1	8	9	14	—	—	—	—	—
2003–04	Florida Panthers	NHL	57	3	10	13	51	—	—	—	—	—
2004–05	Thetford Mines Prolab	LNAH	19	7	15	22	8	17	2	7	9	11
2005–06	Washington Capitals	NHL	52	4	9	13	15	—	—	—	—	—
2006–07	Worcester Sharks	AHL	24	3	15	18	42	—	—	—	—	—
2006–07	Hamilton Bulldogs	AHL	53	7	14	21	52	22	2	6	8	33
2007–08	Hamilton Bulldogs	AHL	35	6	6	12	38	—	—	—	—	—
2008–09	Frankfurt Lions	DEL	49	5	16	21	82	5	0	1	1	6
2009–10	Hamburg Freezers	DEL	56	5	19	24	102	—	—	—	—	—
2010–11	Thetford Mines Isothermic	LNAH	6	1	2	3	0	8	2	3	5	12
2011–12	Thetford Mines Isothermic	LNAH	7	0	2	2	4	—	—	—	—	—
AHL totals			246	24	61	85	241	22	2	6	8	33
NHL totals			253	12	32	44	177	—	—	—	—	—

=== International ===
Year	Team	Event	GP	G	A	Pts	PIM
2000	Canada	WJC	7	0	0	0	8
Junior totals			7	0	0	0	8

== See also ==
- Notable families in the NHL

Awards and achievements
Preceded by Matt Zultek	Los Angeles Kings first-round draft pick 1998	Succeeded by Alexander Frolov
