= Yves Racine =

Canadian ice hockey player (born 1969)

- Born: February 7, 1969 (age 57) Matane, Quebec, Canada
- Height: 6 ft 0 in (183 cm)
- Weight: 205 lb (93 kg; 14 st 9 lb)
- Position: Defence
- Shot: Left
- Played for: Detroit Red Wings; Philadelphia Flyers; Montreal Canadiens; San Jose Sharks; Calgary Flames; Tampa Bay Lightning
- National team: Canada
- NHL draft: 11th overall, 1987; Detroit Red Wings
- Playing career: 1989–2006

Yves Racine (born February 7, 1969) is a Canadian former professional ice hockey defenceman who played in the National Hockey League (NHL).

== Biography ==
As a youth, Racine played in the 1981 and 1982 Quebec International Pee-Wee Hockey Tournaments with a minor ice hockey team from Charlesbourg, Quebec City.

Racine was drafted 11th overall by the Detroit Red Wings in the 1987 NHL entry draft. He played 508 NHL games for the Detroit Red Wings, Montreal Canadiens, Philadelphia Flyers, San Jose Sharks, Calgary Flames and Tampa Bay Lightning, and his last season in NHL was 1997-98.

Later, he played one season in Jokerit in Finland and five seasons in Germany, mostly in Adler Mannheim. Racine won a gold medal playing for Canada at the 1994 World Ice Hockey Championships. He retired after the 2005–2006 season, his 2nd season playing for Thetford-Mines Prolab of the LNAH.

He currently works for Arizona Capital, in Quebec City.

== Career statistics ==
=== Regular season and playoffs ===
			Regular season					Playoffs
Season	Team	League	GP	G	A	Pts	PIM	GP	G	A	Pts	PIM
1984–85	Sainte-Foy Gouverneurs	QMAAA	26	3	6	9	12	—	—	—	—	—
1985–86	Sainte-Foy Gouverneurs	QMAAA	42	4	38	42	66	—	—	—	—	—
1986–87	Longueuil Chevaliers	QMJHL	70	7	43	50	50	20	3	11	14	14
1987–88	Victoriaville Tigres	QMJHL	69	10	84	94	150	5	0	0	0	13
1987–88	Adirondack Red Wings	AHL	—	—	—	—	—	9	4	2	6	2
1988–89	Victoriaville Tigres	QMJHL	63	23	85	108	95	16	3	30	33	41
1988–89	Adirondack Red Wings	AHL	—	—	—	—	—	2	1	1	2	0
1989–90	Adirondack Red Wings	AHL	46	8	27	35	31	—	—	—	—	—
1989–90	Detroit Red Wings	NHL	28	4	9	13	23	—	—	—	—	—
1990–91	Adirondack Red Wings	AHL	16	3	9	12	10	—	—	—	—	—
1990–91	Detroit Red Wings	NHL	62	7	40	47	33	7	2	0	2	0
1991–92	Detroit Red Wings	NHL	61	2	22	24	94	11	2	1	3	10
1992–93	Detroit Red Wings	NHL	80	9	31	40	80	7	1	3	4	27
1993–94	Philadelphia Flyers	NHL	67	9	43	52	48	—	—	—	—	—
1994–95	Montreal Canadiens	NHL	47	4	7	11	42	—	—	—	—	—
1995–96	Montreal Canadiens	NHL	25	0	3	3	26	—	—	—	—	—
1995–96	San Jose Sharks	NHL	32	1	16	17	28	—	—	—	—	—
1996–97	Kentucky Thoroughblades	AHL	4	0	1	1	2	—	—	—	—	—
1996–97	Quebec Rafales	IHL	6	0	4	4	4	—	—	—	—	—
1996–97	Calgary Flames	NHL	46	1	15	16	24	—	—	—	—	—
1997–98	Tampa Bay Lightning	NHL	60	0	8	8	41	—	—	—	—	—
1998–99	Jokerit	SM-l	52	8	18	26	108	3	1	0	1	6
1999–2000	Adler Mannheim	DEL	54	5	21	26	90	5	0	1	1	43
2000–01	Adler Mannheim	DEL	52	4	29	33	98	11	0	7	7	40
2001–02	Adler Mannheim	DEL	48	3	31	34	124	12	2	2	4	10
2002–03	Adler Mannheim	DEL	47	2	18	20	90	8	1	5	6	16
2003–04	Adler Mannheim	DEL	15	2	3	5	44	—	—	—	—	—
2003–04	ERC Ingolstadt	DEL	33	2	10	12	24	8	1	1	2	39
2004–05	Thetford Mines Prolab	LNAH	47	2	41	43	36	—	—	—	—	—
2005–06	Thetford Mines Prolab	LNAH	40	1	31	32	69	—	—	—	—	—
NHL totals			508	37	194	231	439	25	5	4	9	37
DEL totals			249	18	112	130	470	44	4	16	20	148

=== International ===
Medal record

Representing Canada

World Championships
Gold medal – first place	1994 Italy	
Silver medal – second place	1991 Finland	

Year	Team	Event	GP	G	A	Pts	PIM
1989	Canada	WJC	7	0	0	0	6
1991	Canada	WC	4	0	0	0	0
1994	Canada	WC	8	1	2	3	8
Senior totals			12	1	2	3	8

Preceded by Joe Murphy	Detroit Red Wings first-round draft pick 1987	Succeeded by Kory Kocur
