= 2012–13 LNAH season =

Canadian ice hockey league season

The 2012–13 LNAH season was the 17th season of the Ligue Nord-Américaine de Hockey (before 2004 the Quebec Semi-Pro Hockey League), a minor professional league in the Canadian province of Quebec. Seven teams participated in the regular season, which was won by the Marquis de Jonquière. They also won the playoff championship. The leading goal-scorer was Gregory Dupre of Sorel-Tracy, with 32 goals.

== Regular season ==
	GP	W	L	OTL	SOL	GF	GA	Pts
Marquis de Jonquière	40	27	11	1	1	167	135	56
Isothermic de Thetford Mines	40	24	11	4	1	170	140	53
Cornwall River Kings	40	20	17	1	2	156	176	43
3L de Rivière-du-Loup	40	18	15	3	4	165	169	43
HC Carvena de Sorel-Tracy	40	18	15	4	3	161	169	43
Cool FM 103,5 de Saint-Georges	40	18	19	1	2	160	156	38
Caron & Guay de Trois-Rivières	40	15	22	2	1	129	163	33

== Coupe Canam-Playoffs ==
Quarterfinals
Bye
1	Marquis de Jonquière
2	Isothermic de Thetford Mines	2
7	Caron & Guay de Trois-Rivières	3
3	Cornwall River Kings	3
6	Cool FM 103,5 de Saint-Georges	1
4	3L de Rivière-du-Loup	1
5	HC Carvena de Sorel-Tracy	3

Semifinals
1	Marquis de Jonquière	4
7	Caron & Guay de Trois-Rivières	1
3	Cornwall River Kings	1
5	HC Carvena de Sorel-Tracy	4

Final
1	Marquis de Jonquière	4
5	HC Carvena de Sorel-Tracy	2
