= Kory Kocur =

Canadian ice hockey player (born 1969)

- Born: March 6, 1969 (age 57) Kelvington, Saskatchewan, Canada
- Height: 5 ft 11 in (180 cm)
- Weight: 190 lb (86 kg; 13 st 8 lb)
- Position: Right wing
- Shot: Right
- Played for: Adirondack Red Wings; Fort Wayne Komets
- NHL draft: 17th overall, 1988; Detroit Red Wings
- Playing career: 1989–1993

Kory Kocur (born March 6, 1969) is a Canadian former professional ice hockey right winger. Kory was drafted in the 1st round (17th overall) by the Detroit Red Wings in the 1988 NHL entry draft.

== Playing career ==
Kocur rose to prominence playing for the Saskatoon Blades of the Western Hockey League. He showed impressive numbers in the 1987–88 season scoring 71 points in 69 games. The Detroit Red Wings took notice and drafted Kocur in hopes he would follow in the footsteps of his cousin, Joe Kocur. He stayed with the Blades for one more season earning his most impressive numbers to date with 102 points in just 66 games. In 1989 Kocur was brought up to the Adirondack Red Wings of the American Hockey League in hopes that he would continue to produce big numbers. For two years he helped add goals for Adirondack, but never reached the level that the Red Wings organization wanted. In 1991, he was moved to the Fort Wayne Komets of the International Hockey League where he returned to form, albeit on a weaker team. Kocur would return to the Adirondack Red Wings in 1992 for two games before retiring from professional hockey, having never reached the NHL.

== Career statistics ==
			Regular season					Playoffs
Season	Team	League	GP	G	A	Pts	PIM	GP	G	A	Pts	PIM
1986–87	Saskatoon Blades	WHL	62	13	17	30	98	4	0	0	0	7
1987–88	Saskatoon Blades	WHL	69	34	37	71	95	10	5	4	9	18
1988–89	Saskatoon Blades	WHL	66	45	57	102	111	8	7	11	18	15
1989–90	Adirondack Red Wings	AHL	79	18	37	55	36	6	1	2	3	2
1990–91	Adirondack Red Wings	AHL	65	8	13	21	83	2	0	0	0	12
1991–92	Fort Wayne Komets	IHL	69	25	40	65	68	7	3	3	6	49
1992–93	Fort Wayne Komets	IHL	66	21	36	57	77	4	1	1	2	6
1992–93	Adirondack Red Wings	AHL	2	0	0	0	0	—	—	—	—	—
AHL totals			146	26	50	76	119	8	1	2	3	14
IHL totals			135	46	76	122	145	11	4	4	8	55

== See also ==
- List of family relations in the NHL

Preceded by Yves Racine	Detroit Red Wings first-round draft pick 1988	Succeeded by Mike Sillinger
