= Eric Weinrich =

American ice hockey player (born 1966)

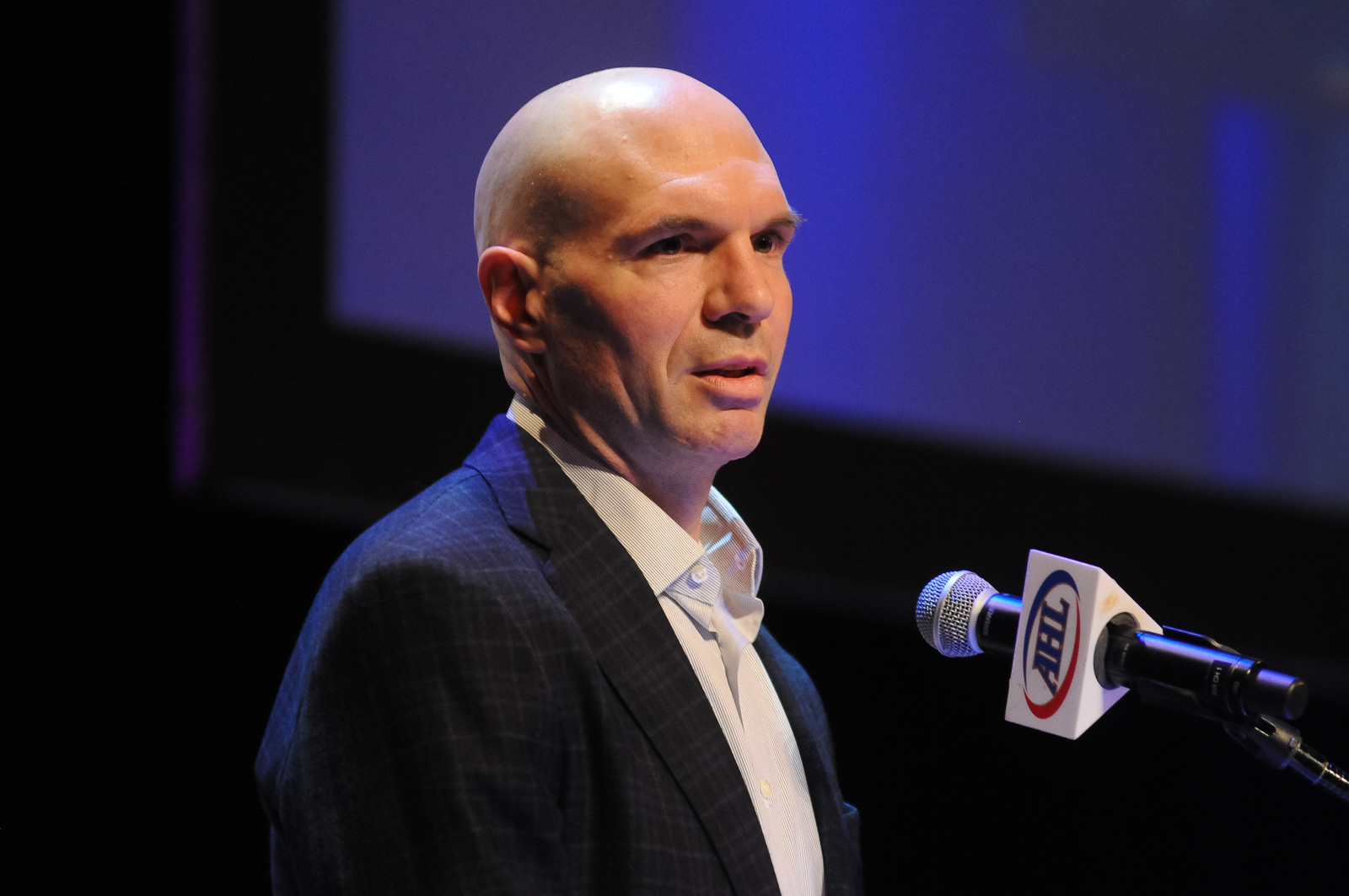
- Weinrich in 2015
- Born: December 19, 1966 (age 59) Roanoke, Virginia, U.S.
- Height: 6 ft 1 in (185 cm)
- Weight: 210 lb (95 kg; 15 st 0 lb)
- Position: Defense
- Shot: Left
- Played for: New Jersey Devils; Hartford Whalers; Chicago Blackhawks; Montreal Canadiens; Boston Bruins; Philadelphia Flyers; St. Louis Blues; Vancouver Canucks
- National team: United States
- NHL draft: 32nd overall, 1985; New Jersey Devils
- Playing career: 1988–2008

Eric John Weinrich (born December 19, 1966) is an American former professional ice hockey defenseman who played 17 seasons in the National Hockey League (NHL) with the New Jersey Devils, Hartford Whalers, Chicago Blackhawks, Montreal Canadiens, Boston Bruins, Philadelphia Flyers, St. Louis Blues, and Vancouver Canucks. He played 1,157 career NHL games, scoring 70 goals and 318 assists for 388 points, and has represented Team USA in more international hockey tournaments than any other American player.

== Amateur career ==
Eric Weinrich grew up in the small town of Gardiner, Maine, went to high school at North Yarmouth Academy in Yarmouth, Maine, and played his college hockey at the University of Maine, where he studied archaeology and anthropology. He played 83 games over three seasons at the University of Maine, and was named an NCAA East Second Team All-American for the 1986–87 season. Weinrich would leave the team the next season to play for the United States national team.

== Professional career ==
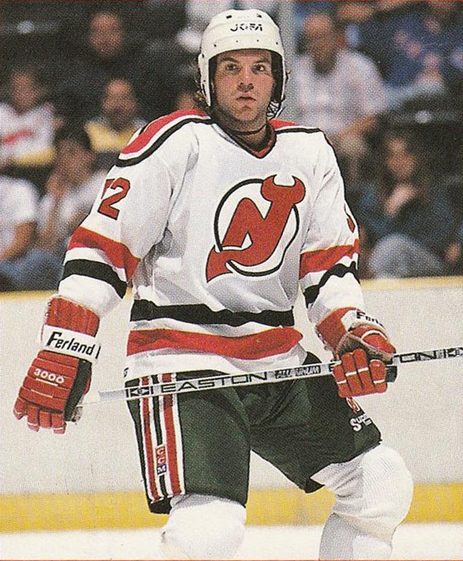
Weinrich with the New Jersey Devils in 1989

Weinrich was originally selected by the Buffalo Sabres in the 1984 NHL entry draft although the pick was deemed invalid as he had yet to clear the minimum age restriction for eligible draftees. Weinrich entered the draft the next year and was drafted 32nd overall by the New Jersey Devils in the 1985 NHL entry draft. Weinrich joined the Utica Devils, the AHL developmental affiliate team of his draft team, the New Jersey Devils for the 1988–89 and 1989–90 AHL seasons, winning the Eddie Shore Award in 1990. He would also play 21 games for the NHL Devils during those years, scoring nine points. He joined New Jersey full-time for the 1990–91 NHL season, having his best offensive year with 38 points and earning a spot on the NHL All-Rookie Team, but would be traded with Sean Burke to the Hartford Whalers for Bobby Holik and draft choices on August 28, 1992.

After spending just over a season with the Whalers, Weinrich was traded with Patrick Poulin to the Chicago Blackhawks for Steve Larmer and Bryan Marchment. He would play for the Blackhawks for several seasons before being traded once again shortly into the 1998–99 NHL season, this time to the Montreal Canadiens. Weinrich again would not last long with his new team, being traded yet again to the Boston Bruins for Patrick Traverse midway through the 2000–01 NHL season in what is believed to have been the first trade between the two teams since 1964.

Weinrich signed a three-year contract with the Philadelphia Flyers as a free agent on July 5, 2001 and played his 1000th game with them during the 2002–03 NHL season. However, this was not enough to prevent him from being traded once again, this time to the St. Louis Blues, shortly after the 2004 NHL All-Star game. During the 2004–05 NHL lockout, he played with VSV EC of the Austrian Hockey League, but returned to the Blues for the 2005–06 NHL season, during which he was traded for the final time, his last NHL team being the Vancouver Canucks.

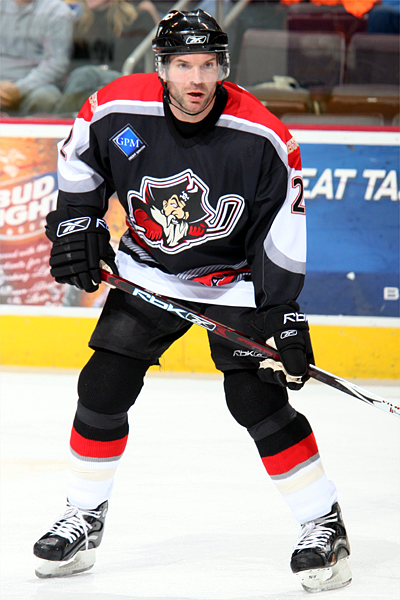
Weinrich with the Portland Pirates in 2007

Weinrich announced his retirement on August 4, 2006 after 17 seasons in the NHL. Upon his retirement, he became an assistant coach for the Portland Pirates in the AHL, then on January 25, 2007 he signed a professional tryout contract with the team and began playing immediately. Weinrich skated with the Pirates for two seasons before hanging up the skates for good after the 2007–08 season.

Weinrich worked as a professional scout for the Buffalo Sabres for three years. In 2015 he was named a development coach for the New Jersey Devils. He is currently an interim assistant coach with the Utica Devils.

== Awards and honors ==
Award	Year
All-Hockey East First Team	1986–87
AHCA East Second-Team All-American	1986–87
Hockey East All-Tournament Team	1987

- AHL First All-Star Team (1990)
- Eddie Shore Award (1990)
- NHL All-Rookie Team (1991)

== Career statistics ==
=== Regular season and playoffs ===
			Regular season					Playoffs
Season	Team	League	GP	G	A	Pts	PIM	GP	G	A	Pts	PIM
1983–84	North Yarmouth Academy	HS-ME	17	23	33	56	—	—	—	—	—	—
1984–85	North Yarmouth Academy	HS-ME	20	6	21	27	—	—	—	—	—	—
1985–86	University of Maine	HE	34	0	14	14	26	—	—	—	—	—
1986–87	University of Maine	HE	41	12	32	44	59	—	—	—	—	—
1987–88	University of Maine	HE	8	4	7	11	22	—	—	—	—	—
1987–88	United States National Team	Intl	38	3	9	12	24	—	—	—	—	—
1988–89	New Jersey Devils	NHL	2	0	0	0	0	—	—	—	—	—
1988–89	Utica Devils	AHL	80	17	27	44	70	5	0	1	1	4
1989–90	Utica Devils	AHL	57	12	48	60	38	—	—	—	—	—
1989–90	New Jersey Devils	NHL	19	2	7	9	11	6	1	3	4	17
1990–91	New Jersey Devils	NHL	76	4	34	38	48	7	1	2	3	6
1991–92	New Jersey Devils	NHL	76	7	25	32	55	7	0	2	2	4
1992–93	Hartford Whalers	NHL	79	7	29	36	76	—	—	—	—	—
1993–94	Hartford Whalers	NHL	8	1	1	2	2	—	—	—	—	—
1993–94	Chicago Blackhawks	NHL	54	3	23	26	31	6	0	2	2	6
1994–95	Chicago Blackhawks	NHL	48	3	10	13	33	16	1	5	6	4
1995–96	Chicago Blackhawks	NHL	77	5	10	15	65	10	1	4	5	10
1996–97	Chicago Blackhawks	NHL	81	7	25	32	62	6	0	1	1	4
1997–98	Chicago Blackhawks	NHL	82	2	21	23	106	—	—	—	—	—
1998–99	Chicago Blackhawks	NHL	14	1	3	4	12	—	—	—	—	—
1998–99	Montreal Canadiens	NHL	66	6	12	18	77	—	—	—	—	—
1999–00	Montreal Canadiens	NHL	77	4	25	29	39	—	—	—	—	—
2000–01	Montreal Canadiens	NHL	60	6	19	25	34	—	—	—	—	—
2000–01	Boston Bruins	NHL	22	1	5	6	10	—	—	—	—	—
2001–02	Philadelphia Flyers	NHL	80	4	20	24	26	5	0	0	0	4
2002–03	Philadelphia Flyers	NHL	81	2	18	20	40	13	2	3	5	12
2003–04	Philadelphia Flyers	NHL	54	2	7	9	32	—	—	—	—	—
2003–04	St. Louis Blues	NHL	26	2	8	10	14	5	0	1	1	0
2004–05	EC VSV	EBEL	10	3	8	11	8	3	0	1	1	6
2005–06	St. Louis Blues	NHL	59	1	16	17	44	—	—	—	—	—
2005–06	Vancouver Canucks	NHL	16	0	0	0	8	—	—	—	—	—
2006–07	Portland Pirates	AHL	36	2	12	14	34	—	—	—	—	—
2007–08	Portland Pirates	AHL	52	1	7	8	68	—	—	—	—	—
NHL totals			1,157	70	318	388	825	81	6	23	29	67

=== International ===
Medal record

Representing United States

World Championships
Bronze medal – third place	2004 Czech Republic	

World Junior Championships
Bronze medal – third place	1986 Canada	

Year	Team	Event	GP	G	A	Pts	PIM
1985	United States	WJC	7	1	1	2	8
1986	United States	WJC	7	1	0	1	4
1988	United States	OG	6	0	0	0	0
1991	United States	WC	10	2	1	3	6
1991	United States	CC	8	0	0	0	2
1993	United States	WC	6	0	1	1	0
1994	United States	WC	6	0	1	1	0
1997	United States	WC	6	0	4	4	2
1998	United States	WC	6	0	2	2	16
1999	United States	WC	6	1	2	3	2
2000	United States	WC	7	0	2	2	4
2001	United States	WC	9	0	2	2	8
2002	United States	WC	3	0	1	1	2
2004	United States	WC	4	0	0	0	8
2004	United States	WCH	2	0	0	0	0
Junior totals			14	2	1	3	12
Senior totals			79	3	16	19	50

== See also ==
- List of NHL players with 1,000 games played
