= 2009–10 LNAH season =

Canadian ice hockey league season

The 2009–10 LNAH season was the 14th season of the Ligue Nord-Américaine de Hockey (before 2004 the Quebec Semi-Pro Hockey League), a minor professional league in the Canadian province of Quebec. Seven teams participated in the regular season, and CRS Express de Saint-Georges won the league title.

== Regular season ==
	GP	W	L	OTL	SOL	GF	GA	Pts
Saint-François de Sherbrooke	44	25	11	5	3	178	156	58
Caron & Guay de Trois-Rivières	44	25	11	5	3	184	165	58
Marquis de Saguenay	44	27	15	0	2	178	155	56
CRS Express de Saint-Georges	44	25	16	2	1	191	181	53
CIMT de Rivière-du-Loup	44	21	19	3	1	175	173	46
Isothermic de Thetford Mines	44	16	24	2	2	168	209	36
Lois Jeans de Pont-Rouge	36	11	22	1	2	141	176	21

== Coupe Futura-Playoffs ==
Won by CRS Express de Saint-Georges.
