= 2011–12 LNAH season =

Canadian ice hockey league season

The 2011–12 LNAH season was the 16th season of the Ligue Nord-Américaine de Hockey (before 2004 the Quebec Semi-Pro Hockey League), a minor professional league in the Canadian province of Quebec. Seven teams participated in the regular season, which was won by the Marquis de Saguenay. Isothermic de Thetford Mines won the playoff championship.

== Regular season ==
	GP	W	L	OTL	SOL	GF	GA	Pts
Marquis de Saguenay	42	29	16	2	1	216	195	61
Caron & Guay de Trois-Rivières	42	24	18	4	2	178	176	54
Isothermic de Thetford Mines	42	25	20	0	3	200	177	53
Wild de Windsor	42	25	20	1	2	207	201	53
Cool FM 103,5 de Saint-Georges	42	22	18	1	7	191	185	52
HC Carvena de Sorel-Tracy	42	22	24	0	2	197	215	46
3L de Rivière-du-Loup	42	21	24	3	0	179	219	45

== Coupe Canam-Playoffs ==
Semifinals
1	Marquis de Saguenay	2
4	Wild de Windsor	4
2	Caron & Guay de Trois-Rivières	2
3	Isothermic de Thetford Mines	4

Final
3	Isothermic de Thetford Mines	4
4	Wild de Windsor	2
