= Patrick Traverse =

Canadian ice hockey player (born 1974)

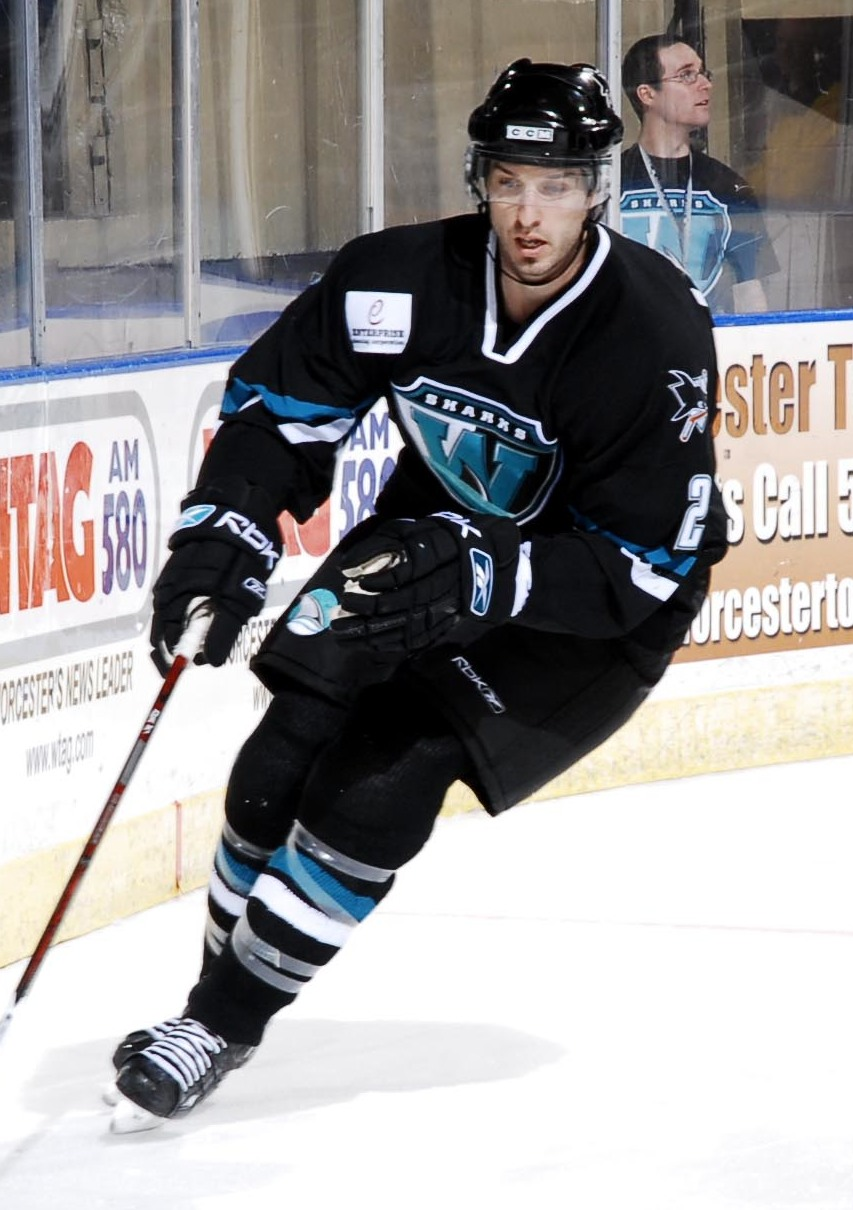
- Traverse with the Worcester Sharks in 2007
- Born: March 14, 1974 (age 52) Montreal, Quebec, Canada
- Height: 6 ft 4 in (193 cm)
- Weight: 207 lb (94 kg; 14 st 11 lb)
- Position: Defence
- Shot: Left
- Played for: Ottawa Senators; Mighty Ducks of Anaheim; Boston Bruins; Montreal Canadiens; Dallas Stars; DEG Metro Stars; Hamburg Freezers
- National team: Canada
- NHL draft: 50th overall, 1992; Ottawa Senators
- Playing career: 1993–2012

Patrick Traverse (born March 14, 1974) is a Canadian former professional ice hockey defenceman. He played 279 games in the National Hockey League (NHL) with five teams including the Ottawa Senators, Mighty Ducks of Anaheim, Boston Bruins, Montreal Canadiens, and Dallas Stars. He was selected by the Ottawa Senators in the third round, 50th overall, in the 1992 NHL entry draft and joined the organization in 1993. In 2009, he left North America to play in the Deutsche Eishockey Liga in Germany with the DEG Metro Stars and Hamburg Freezers. He played internationally for Canada at the 2000 World Championship.

== Playing career ==
=== Amateur ===
As a youth, Traverse played in the 1988 Quebec International Pee-Wee Hockey Tournament with a minor ice hockey team from Hochelaga-Maisonneuve. He played with the Montreal-Bourassa Canadiens, a AAA minor hockey team, in 1990–91, earning the Guy Lafleur Award of Excellence, which celebrates the combination of academic excellence and sports.

Traverse was selected by the Shawinigan Cataractes of the Quebec Major Junior Hockey League (QMJHL) in the 1991 QMJHL entry draft in the first round, fourth overall. He joined the Cataractes for the 1991–92 season and recorded three goals and 11 assists for 14 points in 59 games. The Cataractes qualified for the playoffs and advanced to the division finals where they were eliminated. Traverse appeared in ten playoff games, going scoreless. He returned to Shawinigan for the 1992–93 season marking five goals and 29 points in 53 games. He was considered an imposing, physical defenceman, with a good first pass out of the defensive zone. Ahead of the 1993 playoffs, Traverse and two other players were traded to the Saint-Jean Lynx on February 17, 1993. Traverse made 15 regular season appearances for the Lynx, scoring one goal and seven points. In the playoffs, Traverse recorded one assist in four playoff games as the Lynx were swept in four games by the Hull Olympiques in the first round. In his first full season with Saint-Jean in 1993–94, Traverse marked 15 goals and 52 points in 66 games. The team qualified for the playoffs and faced the Sherbrooke Faucons in the first round. The Lynx were eliminated and Traverse made five playoff appearances, recording four assists.

=== Professional ===
==== Ottawa Senators ====
Ahead of the National Hockey League (NHL)'s 1992 entry draft in June 1992, Traverse was scouted by the NHL Central Scouting Bureau, and was ranked as the sixth best player coming out of the QMJHL in December 1991. By the end of April 1992, he was rated as the 18th best North American player available in the draft, and was considered a possibility to go in the first round. Ultimately, Traverse was selected by the Ottawa Senators in the third round, 50th overall, in the entry draft, and the second player from the QMJHL. After his junior team was eliminated, Traverse joined Ottawa's American Hockey League (AHL) affiliate, the New Haven Senators, for the final two games of the 1992–93 season, going scoreless. For the second year, after his junior team had been eliminated from the playoffs in April 1994, he was assigned to Ottawa's AHL affiliate, the Prince Edward Island Senators, for the remainder of the 1993–94 season. He played in three games in the AHL, recording one assist.

In June 1994, Traverse signed a contract with the Ottawa Senators. He attended the Senators 1994 training camp, but faced strong competition as general manager Randy Sexton had brought in veteran defencemen, including Jim Paek, Chris Dahlquist and Sean Hill and prospects such as Radim Bičánek and Stanislav Neckář in an effort to improve Ottawa's defence. However, he was assigned to Prince Edward Island in September, with Sexton and head coach Rick Bowness agreeing that Traverse needed more development. He spent the entire 1994–95 season in the AHL, tallying five goals and 18 points in 70 games. Prince Edward Island finished first in the Atlantic Division and advanced to the second round of the 1995 Calder Cup playoffs before being eliminated by the Fredericton Canadiens. In seven playoff games, Traverse added two assists.

Traverse was assigned to Prince Edward Island to start the 1995–96 season. In October he suffered a broken thumb, causing him to miss time. After returning from the injury, he was recalled by Ottawa on December 29, 1995 and made his NHL debut in the 1995–96 season in a 4–1 loss to the Montreal Canadiens on December 30. He appeared in five games, going scoreless, before being returned to the AHL at the NHL's all-star break on January 18. During the five games, he was routinely played with other inexperienced defencemen such as Neckář, Jaroslav Modrý, and Dennis Vial, as the Senators went through an injury crisis among their defence corps. He finished with four goals and 25 points in 55 games with Prince Edward Island. The AHL Senators finished first in the Atlantic Division again and made the playoffs, but were knocked out by Fredericton for the second year in a row, this time in the first round. In five playoff games, Traverse recorded one goal and three points.

Ottawa assigned Traverse to its new AHL affiliate, the Worcester IceCats to begin the 1996–97 season. In 24 games with Worcester, he notched only four assists. However, he suffered torn ligaments in his knee and missed time. In March 1997, he was reassigned by Ottawa to the Grand Rapids Griffins of the International Hockey League. In ten games with Grand Rapids, Traverse scored two goals and three points. The Griffins qualified for the 1997 Turner Cup playoffs and lost in the first round to the Orlando Solar Bears. Traverse appeared in two playoff games, notching one assist.

In the offseason, Traverse was a restricted free agent and was offered a qualifying offer. However, he did not sign with Ottawa, instead agreeing to terms with the Hershey Bears of the AHL right before the start of the 1997–98 season, though Ottawa retained his NHL rights. He played poorly to start the season and became the target of negative fan chants in Hershey. Traverse marked 14 goals and 29 points in 71 games, including a hat trick, that led to the team's fans reversing their opinion of him. In March 1998, Traverse suffered a hip pointer that caused him to miss time. Hershey finished second in the Mid-Atlantic Division and made the playoffs. They advanced to the second round where they were eliminated by the eventual champions, the Philadelphia Phantoms. Traverse made seven playoff appearances, recording one goal and four points.

In the 1998 offseason the NHL expanded by one team, the Nashville Predators. Traverse was made available for selection by Ottawa in the 1998 NHL expansion draft, but was not selected. He signed a new one-year contract with Ottawa in July. At Senators training camp, two open spots in the defence corps were open as Janne Laukkanen missed the beginning of the season due to injury and Neckář remained unsigned. Traverse competed with Sami Salo and Bičánek for the open spots. However, an injury to Jason York allowed all three to stay with Ottawa to begin the 1998–99 season. He was paired with Lance Pitlick to begin the season, however, once Neckář signed, the Senators had too many defencemen and players were in and out of the lineup. Injuries to Neckář and Salo soon cleared up the logjam and Traverse recorded his first NHL points on October 31, assisting on goals by Alexei Yashin and Andreas Johansson in a 5–1 victory over the Montreal Canadiens. He tallied his first NHL goal on January 2, 1999, beating goaltender Martin Brodeur, in a 6–0 shutout win over the New Jersey Devils. In a game against the New York Islanders on January 30, he suffered a mild concussion that kept him out of the lineup for a few games. He returned in February only to suffer a sprained shoulder injury on February 20 in a game against the Philadelphia Flyers. He missed a further 13 games with the injury. In 46 games with the Senators, Traverse recorded the one goal and ten points.

In the 1999 offseason, the league expanded again, adding the Atlanta Thrashers. In the 1999 NHL expansion draft, Traverse was among the defencemen made available for selection by the Senators, but was not chosen. However, this was due to a trade by general manager Marshall Johnston, who sent goaltender Damian Rhodes to Atlanta in exchange for the promise to select only certain players from the Senators, namely Chris Luongo and Phil Crowe, and in essence, expanding the Senators' draft protection to Traverse. Ottawa's management believed that Traverse would take the next step in his career and as a result, let Lance Pitlick depart as a free agent. Traverse made Ottawa's roster as the extra defenceman going into the 1999–2000 season. After injuries to Igor Kravchuk and Salo, Traverse moved up the depth chart and his play was soon complimented by head coach Jacques Martin. In late February 2000, Traverse himself missed time due to injury after suffering a bruised shoulder in a game against the Carolina Hurricanes on February 15. Traverse finished the regular season with six goals and 23 points in 66 games. The Senators qualified for the playoffs and faced the Toronto Maple Leafs in the first round. Traverse made his NHL playoff debut in Game 1 on April 22, a 2–1 loss. The best-of-seven series went to six games, with the Maple Leafs prevailing. In the six games, Traverse went scoreless.

==== Mighty Ducks of Anaheim and Boston Bruins ====
On June 12, 2000, Traverse was traded to the Mighty Ducks of Anaheim for defenceman Joel Kwiatkowski. A restricted free agent, he and the Mighty Ducks could not agree on a contract and went to salary arbitration, where he was awarded a one-year contract worth $550,000. He made his Anaheim debut in the opening game of the 2000–01 season against the Minnesota Wild on the second defence pairing with Vitaly Vishnevskiy. He recorded his first goal and point for the Mighty Ducks on October 17 on John Vanbiesbrouck in a 4–3 victory over the New York Islanders. However, Traverse fell out of favour with coach Craig Hartsburg by the beginning of November and was often scratched from the lineup. In 15 games with Anaheim, he recorded just the one goal.

Traverse was traded to the Boston Bruins on November 18, along with winger Andrei Nazarov for forward Samuel Påhlsson. He made his Bruins debut on November 21 in a 2–1 loss to the Ottawa Senators. He scored his first goal and point for his new team in the following game on November 22, the game-winning goal on goaltender Chris Osgood in a 5–4 victory over the Detroit Red Wings. Traverse made 37 appearances for the Bruins, tallying two goals and eight points.

==== Montreal Canadiens ====
The Montreal Canadiens acquired Traverse in exchange for defenceman Eric Weinrich on February 21, 2001. It marked the first time the two teams had traded with each other since 1964. He made his debut for his third team of the season in a 3–1 loss to the Washington Capitals on February 23. Traverse picked up his first point for the Canadiens assisting on Jim Campbell's goal in the second period of a 4–1 victory over the Pittsburgh Penguins on February 28. He marked his first goal for Montreal on March 3 on goaltender Brian Boucher, in a two-point effort in a 3–1 win over the Philadelphia Flyers. In 19 games with Montreal, Traverse tallied two goals and five points. In May, he signed a three-year contract with Montreal.

Traverse began the 2001–02 season as one of the Canadiens' top six defencemen. However, he was soon scratched by coach Michel Therrien and replaced by other defencemen, among them rookie Martti Järventie. Shortly after re-entering the lineup in late October and seeing some time playing as a forward on the fourth line, Traverse suffered sprained knee ligaments in early November. He returned from his injury in early December after missing 12 games, but was sent to Montreal's AHL affiliate, the Quebec Citadelles for a conditioning loan. He made four appearances for Quebec, tallying two assists. He was recalled on December 10, and played in a 4–0 win over the Minnesota Wild that night. On January 10, 2002, Traverse suffered a concussion after taking a clean bodycheck from Michael Peca of the New York Islanders. He was knocked unconscious and remained on the ice for 15 minutes until removed via stretcher and taken to the hospital. He recovered and was cleared to play on February 5, but only returned to the ice on February 11 after missing 13 games. He finished the season with two and five points in 23 games.

Ahead of the 2002–03 season, Traverse was among the Montreal defencemen made available by the team for selection in the waiver draft, but was not selected. He started the season as a healthy scratch, but soon swapped places with struggling rookie Ron Hainsey. He re-established himself in the lineup and was paired with Patrice Brisebois, as the defencemen ahead of him on the depth chart, such as Hainsey, Francis Bouillon, and Stéphane Robidas, were all assigned to the AHL or traded away. As players came off the injured list though, Traverse's play time began to be cut and by March 2003, the Canadiens had eight defencemen available and Traverse was scratched for multiple games. He played in 65 games for Montreal, recording 13 assists.

Towards the end of the season as their playoffs aspirations faded, Montreal had begun a youth movement and Traverse was among those being displaced by the incoming players. He was left unprotected in the waiver draft ahead of the season and after going unclaimed, was assigned to Montreal's new AHL affiliate, the Hamilton Bulldogs for the 2003–04 season. He spent the entire season with Hamilton, appearing in 80 games, scoring five goals and 26 points. The Bulldogs finished first in their division and qualified for the playoffs, advancing to the third round where they were eliminated by the Rochester Americans. Traverse appeared in ten playoff games, tallying one goal and three points.

==== Dallas Stars and AHL ====
An unrestricted free agent at season's end, Traverse signed a one-year contract with the Dallas Stars in the 2004 offseason. Then, on September 25, 2004, he signed a new contract with the Houston Aeros of the AHL. With the NHL going through a labour disagreement, Traverse spent the entire 2004–05 season with Houston, scoring six goals and 15 points in 72 games. The Aeros qualified for the playoffs and were eliminated by the Chicago Wolves in the opening round. In five playoff games, Traverse went scoreless.

Traverse was once again an unrestricted free agent in the 2005 offseason. He re-signed with Dallas to a one-year contract in August. He attended Dallas' training camp but did not make the team and was assigned to the team's AHL affiliate, the Iowa Stars, to start the 2005–06 season. He suffered a lower body injury in late November, while tied for the lead in scoring on the team. He returned to Iowa's lineup on January 5, 2006 after missing 16 games. He was recalled by Dallas on January 24 after defencemen Janne Niinimaa was questionable for the next game and Trevor Daley was out with the flu. He made his Dallas debut on January 25 against the St. Louis Blues, going scoreless. He suffered an ankle injury in the game and was placed on injured reserve by Dallas on January 30. He was returned to Iowa in March and returned to their lineup on March 17. He finished the season appearing 40 games for Iowa, scoring three goals and 21 points. Iowa made the playoffs, but were eliminated in the first round by the Milwaukee Admirals. Traverse had one goal and three points in seven playoff games.

An unrestricted free agent in the 2006 offseason, he signed with the San Jose Sharks in July. He was placed on waivers by San Jose during training camp in September. The Montreal Canadiens claimed him after injuries to Francis Bouillon and Sheldon Souray eliminated their depth and their rookies did not impress in camp. However, his time with Montreal was short lived as the Canadiens then traded for Janne Niinimaa, and Traverse was placed on waivers again, with the intention of sending him to Hamilton of the AHL. He went unclaimed and made 26 appearances for the Bulldogs, tallying one goal and five points. He was traded back to the San Jose Sharks on December 15, in exchange for defenceman Mathieu Biron. The Sharks immediately assigned him to their AHL affiliate, the Worcester Sharks. He played in 54 games with Worcester, scoring five goals and 22 points. Worcester finished fourth in their division, but made the playoffs and were knocked out in the first round by the Manchester Monarchs. Traverse recorded two assists in six playoff games.

Traverse re-signed with Worcester in July 2007. He appeared in 65 games for Worcester in the 2007–08 season, scoring six goals and 25 points. He attended San Jose's training camp in September 2008, but was returned to Worcester for the 2008–09 season. He played in 78 games for Worcester, scoring nine goals and 42 points. Worcester finished fourth in their division and qualified for the playoffs. They advanced to the second round were they were eliminated by the Providence Bruins. Traverse scored four goals and nine points in 12 playoff games.

==== Europe ====
Traverse headed overseas and signed for the DEG Metro Stars of the Deutsche Eishockey Liga on July 10, 2009. In 53 games with the Metro Stars in the 2009–10 season, he marked three goals and 32 points. DEG made the playoffs and Traverse added four assists in three playoff games. He signed with rival Hamburg Freezers to a one-year contract on March 19, 2010. He recorded eight goals and 26 points in 52 games with Hamburg during the 2010–11 season. He returned for a final season in 2011–12, making 51 appearances and scoring seven goals and 15 points. Hamburg qualified for the playoffs and in five playoff games, Traverse recorded one goal and two points.

== International play ==
Traverse was invited to play for Team Canada at the 2000 World Championships in May 2000. Traverse made eight appearances at the tournament, recording one goal, in a shock loss to Norway on May 1. The Canadians advanced to the semifinals, which they lost to the Czech Republic, forcing them to play for the bronze medal against Finland, which they lost too, to finish fourth.

== Personal life ==
Traverse is married.

== Career statistics ==
=== Regular season and playoffs ===
			Regular season					Playoffs
Season	Team	League	GP	G	A	Pts	PIM	GP	G	A	Pts	PIM
1991–92	Shawinigan Cataractes	QMJHL	59	3	11	14	12	—	—	—	—	—
1992–93	Shawinigan Cataractes	QMJHL	53	5	24	29	24	—	—	—	—	—
1992–93	Saint-Jean Lynx	QMJHL	15	1	6	7	0	—	—	—	—	—
1992–93	New Haven Senators	AHL	2	0	0	0	2	—	—	—	—	—
1993–94	Saint-Jean Lynx	QMJHL	66	15	37	52	30	—	—	—	—	—
1993–94	Prince Edward Island Senators	AHL	3	0	1	1	2	—	—	—	—	—
1994–95	Prince Edward Island Senators	AHL	70	5	13	18	19	7	0	2	2	0
1995–96	Prince Edward Island Senators	AHL	55	4	21	25	32	5	1	2	3	2
1995–96	Ottawa Senators	NHL	5	0	0	0	2	—	—	—	—	—
1996–97	Worcester IceCats	AHL	24	0	4	4	23	—	—	—	—	—
1996–97	Grand Rapids Griffins	IHL	10	2	1	3	10	2	0	1	1	2
1997–98	Hershey Bears	AHL	71	14	15	29	67	7	1	3	4	4
1998–99	Ottawa Senators	NHL	46	1	9	10	22	—	—	—	—	—
1999–00	Ottawa Senators	NHL	66	6	17	23	21	6	0	0	0	2
2000–01	Mighty Ducks of Anaheim	NHL	15	1	0	1	6	—	—	—	—	—
2000–01	Boston Bruins	NHL	37	2	6	8	14	—	—	—	—	—
2000–01	Montreal Canadiens	NHL	19	2	3	5	10	—	—	—	—	—
2001–02	Montreal Canadiens	NHL	25	2	3	5	14	—	—	—	—	—
2001–02	Quebec Citadelles	AHL	4	0	2	2	4	—	—	—	—	—
2002–03	Montreal Canadiens	NHL	65	0	13	13	24	—	—	—	—	—
2003–04	Hamilton Bulldogs	AHL	80	5	21	26	31	10	1	2	3	0
2004–05	Houston Aeros	AHL	72	6	9	15	28	5	0	0	0	2
2005–06	Iowa Stars	AHL	40	3	21	24	16	7	1	2	3	2
2005–06	Dallas Stars	NHL	1	0	0	0	0	—	—	—	—	—
2006–07	Hamilton Bulldogs	AHL	26	1	4	5	10	—	—	—	—	—
2006–07	Worcester Sharks	AHL	54	5	17	22	14	6	0	2	2	2
2007–08	Worcester Sharks	AHL	65	6	19	25	52	—	—	—	—	—
2008–09	Worcester Sharks	AHL	78	9	33	42	28	12	4	5	9	4
2009–10	DEG Metro Stars	DEL	53	3	29	32	28	3	0	4	4	8
2010–11	Hamburg Freezers	DEL	52	8	18	26	28	—	—	—	—	—
2011–12	Hamburg Freezers	DEL	51	7	8	15	32	5	1	1	2	6
NHL totals			279	14	51	65	113	6	0	0	0	2

=== International ===
Year	Team	Event	Result	GP	G	A	Pts	PIM
2000	Canada	WC	4th	8	1	0	1	0
Senior totals				8	1	0	1	0

== Sources ==
- Chaimovitch, Jason, ed. (2024). 2024–2025 American Hockey League Official Guide & Record Book. Springfield, Massachusetts: American Hockey League. OCLC 22147888.
