= 2008–09 LNAH season =

Canadian ice hockey league season

The 2008–09 LNAH season was the 13th season of the Ligue Nord-Américaine de Hockey (before 2004 the Quebec Semi-Pro Hockey League), a minor professional league in the Canadian province of Quebec. Nine teams participated in the regular season, and Lois Jeans de Pont-Rouge won the league title.

== Regular season ==
| | GP | W | L | OTL | SOL | GF | GA | Pts |
|---|---|---|---|---|---|---|---|---|
| Lois Jeans de Pont-Rouge | 44 | 30 | 10 | 1 | 3 | 208 | 147 | 64 |
| Saint-François de Sherbrooke | 44 | 24 | 12 | 4 | 4 | 201 | 171 | 56 |
| CRS Express de Saint-Georges | 44 | 26 | 14 | 1 | 3 | 194 | 151 | 56 |
| Isothermic de Thetford Mines | 44 | 23 | 15 | 3 | 3 | 181 | 184 | 52 |
| Chiefs de Saint-Hyacinthe | 44 | 24 | 16 | 2 | 2 | 165 | 174 | 48 |
| Caron & Guay de Trois-Rivières | 44 | 20 | 18 | 4 | 2 | 188 | 179 | 46 |
| CIMT de Rivière-du-Loup | 44 | 18 | 23 | 3 | 0 | 151 | 184 | 39 |
| 98.3 FM de Saguenay | 44 | 14 | 27 | 2 | 1 | 141 | 192 | 31 |
| Poutrelles Delta de Sainte-Marie | 32 | 13 | 17 | 2 | 0 | 116 | 163 | 28 |

== Coupe Futura-Playoffs ==
Won by Lois Jeans de Pont-Rouge.
