= Sainte-Marie Poutrelles Delta =

- City: Sainte-Marie, Quebec
- League: Ligue Nord-Americaine de Hockey
- Founded: 2003
- Folded: 2009
- Home arena: Arena Paul-Henri Drouin
- Colours: Red, Blue, White

Franchise history
- 2003-2009: Sainte-Marie Poutrelles Delta

The Sainte-Marie Poutrelles Delta were a Canadian minor pro ice hockey team in Sainte-Marie, Quebec. They played in the Ligue centrale de hockey from 2003 to 2008, and the Ligue Nord-Americaine de Hockey from 2008 to 2009. The club folded in 2009.

== Records ==
- Games Jesse Belanger 31
- Goals Jesse Belanger, Simon Nadeau 15
- Assists Jesse Belanger 28
- Points Jesse Belanger 43
- PIM Neil Posillico 141

== Notable players ==
- Jesse Belanger
- Maxime Ouellet
- Michel Picard
