= 2007–08 LNAH season =

Canadian ice hockey league season

The 2007–08 LNAH season was the 12th season of the Ligue Nord-Américaine de Hockey (before 2004 the Quebec Semi-Pro Hockey League), a minor professional league in the Canadian province of Quebec. Eight teams participated in the regular season, and Caron & Guay de Trois-Rivieres won the league title.

== Regular season ==
	GP	W	L	OTL	SOL	GF	GA	Pts
Top Design de Saint-Hyacinthe	52	31	13	4	4	262	221	70
CRS Express de Saint-Georges	52	31	17	0	4	233	206	66
Caron & Guay de Trois-Rivières	52	28	18	4	2	208	202	62
Summum-Chiefs de Saint-Jean-sur-Richelieu	52	28	21	1	2	268	237	59
Radio X de Québec	52	27	22	2	1	220	221	57
Saint-François de Sherbrooke	52	24	22	2	4	222	221	54
Mission de Sorel-Tracy	52	20	27	2	3	226	275	45
Isothermic de Thetford Mines	52	19	31	1	1	207	263	40

== Coupe Futura-Playoffs ==
Won by Caron & Guay de Trois-Rivières
