= 2006–07 LNAH season =

Canadian ice hockey league season

The 2006–07 LNAH season was the 11th season of the Ligue Nord-Américaine de Hockey (before 2004 the Quebec Semi-Pro Hockey League), a minor professional league in the Canadian province of Quebec. Eight teams participated in the regular season, and the Summum-Chiefs de Saint-Jean-Sur-Riechelieu won the league title.

== Regular season ==
	GP	W	L	OTL	SOL	GF	GA	Pts
Saint-François de Sherbrooke	48	31	13	2	2	219	169	66
Summum-Chiefs de Saint-Jean-sur-Richelieu	48	32	14	1	1	215	172	66
CRS Express de Saint-Georges	48	24	16	6	2	199	195	56
Mission de Sorel-Tracy	48	25	21	0	2	204	204	52
Prolab de Thetford Mines	48	23	22	1	2	212	228	49
Radio X de Québec	48	21	22	3	2	190	202	47
Top Design de Saint-Hyacinthe	48	18	25	3	2	176	208	41
Caron & Guay de Trois-Rivières	48	18	26	1	3	190	227	40

== Coupe Futura-Playoffs ==
Won by Summum-Chiefs de Saint-Jean-sur-Richelieu.
