= 2005–06 LNAH season =

Canadian ice hockey league season

The 2005–06 LNAH season was the 10th season of the Ligue Nord-Américaine de Hockey (before 2004 the Quebec Semi-Pro Hockey League), a minor professional league in the Canadian province of Quebec. Nine teams participated in the regular season, and Saint-Francois de Sherbrooke won the league title.

== Regular season ==
	GP	W	L	OTL	SOL	GF	GA	Pts
Radio X de Québec	56	43	12	1	0	291	196	87
Saint-François de Sherbrooke	56	36	13	3	4	248	174	79
Caron & Guay de Trois-Rivières	56	33	14	0	9	209	176	75
Dragons de Verdun	56	31	19	2	4	272	235	68
Mission de Sorel-Tracy	56	27	24	4	1	222	223	59
Prolab de Thetford Mines	56	25	25	1	5	216	228	56
CRS Express de Saint-Georges	56	24	29	1	2	222	261	51
Chiefs de Laval	56	19	33	4	0	217	283	42
Cristal de Saint-Hyacinthe	56	14	39	1	2	180	301	31

== Coupe Futura-Playoffs ==
Won by Saint-François de Sherbrooke.
