= Thetford Assurancia =

- City: Thetford Mines, Quebec
- League: LNAH
- Founded: 1996
- Home arena: Centre Mario Gosselin
- General manager: François Jacques
- Head coach: Bobby Baril

Franchise history
- 1996–2000: Thetford Mines Coyotes
- 2000–2007: Thetford Mines Prolab
- 2007–2015: Thetford Mines Isothermic
- 2015–present: Thetford Assurancia

Championships
- Regular season titles: 1; 2021–2022
- Division titles: None
- Playoff championships: 4; 2011–12, 2014–15, 2021–2022, 2023–2024

Assurancia de Thetford or The Thetford Assurancia (previously Thetford Mines Isothermic) are a professional ice hockey team based in Thetford Mines, Quebec. The team is part of the Ligue Nord-Américaine de Hockey (LNAH). The team plays at the Centre Mario Gosselin.

== History ==
Previously this LNAH franchise was known as the Thetford Mines Coyotes (1996–2000), and as the Thetford Mines Prolab (2000–07). In 2007, team was renamed again as Thetford Mines Isothermic after its sponsors, Portes & Fenêtres Isothermic, a local seller of doors, windows and furnishings. The team got a new sponsor in 2015 and was renamed Thetford Assurancia. It is the last remaining original franchise of the LNAH in its original city.

== Notable players ==
- Mathieu Biron, former Florida Panthers and New York Islanders defenseman
- Philippe DeRouville, former Pittsburgh Penguins draft pick.
- Christian Proulx, former Montreal Canadiens draft pick.
- Link Gaetz, former NHL enforcer
- Jeremy Stevenson, former Mighty Ducks of Anaheim and Minnesota Wild forward
- Patrice Tardif, former Los Angeles Kings and St. Louis Blues forward
- Yves Racine, former Detroit Red Wings defenseman
- Michel Picard, former Hartford Whalers forward
- Daniel Poudrier, former Quebec Nordiques defenseman
- Marquis Mathieu, former Boston Bruins forward
- Gaetan Royer, former Tampa Bay Lightning forward
- Eric Lavigne, former Los Angeles Kings defenseman
- Olivier Michaud, former Montreal Canadiens goalie
- Daniel Goneau, former New York Rangers forward
