= 2004–05 LNAH season =

Canadian ice hockey league season

The 2004–05 LNAH season was the ninth season of the Ligue Nord-Américaine de Hockey (before 2004 the Quebec Semi-Pro Hockey League), a minor professional league in the Canadian province of Quebec. Ten teams participated in the regular season, and Radio X de Quebec won the league title.

== Regular season ==
	GP	W	L	OTL	SOL	GF	GA	Pts
Radio X de Québec	60	41	14	1	4	265	177	87
Mission de Sorel-Tracy	60	41	15	2	2	253	181	86
Saint-François de Sherbrooke	60	36	20	2	2	227	198	76
Prolab de Thetford Mines	60	33	18	2	7	233	203	75
Dragons de Verdun	60	35	22	0	3	282	234	73
Garaga de Saint-Georges	60	33	21	1	5	241	216	72
Cousin de Saint-Hyacinthe	60	24	30	4	2	205	255	54
Caron & Guay de Trois-Rivières	60	21	33	2	4	181	217	48
Chiefs de Laval	60	15	38	6	1	207	323	37
Fjord du Saguenay	24	3	21	0	0	62	152	6

== Coupe Futura-Playoffs ==
Won by Radio X de Québec.
