= Pont Rouge Lois Jeans =

- City: Pont Rouge, Quebec
- League: Ligue Nord-Américaine de Hockey
- Operated: 1996–2010
- Colours: Black, White and Red

Franchise history
- 1996–1997: Vanier Voyagers
- 1997–1998: Quebec Aces
- 1999–2000: Beaupre Caron & Guay
- 2000–2001: Beaupre Aces
- 2001–2003: Quebec Aces
- 2003–2008: Quebec RadioX
- 2008–2010: Pont Rouge Lois Jeans

Pont Rouge Lois Jeans was a hockey team based in Pont Rouge, Quebec in Canada. The team was part of the Ligue Nord-Américaine de Hockey (LNAH).

The team had been known by many names such as the Vanier Voyageurs, Quebec Ace, Beaupré Caron et Guay, Beaupré Aces and Quebec RadioX. After the 2007–08 season the team relocated again from Quebec City to its final location in Pont Rouge. While they were the RadioX they played at the Pavillon de la Jeunesse, having previously played at the Colisée Pepsi. The team was owned by Genex Communications, who also owns the CHOI-FM radio station, which also calls itself RadioX.
