= Mario De Bénédictis =

Canadian-Italian ice hockey player

- Born: March 28, 1966 (age 59) Montreal, Quebec, Canada
- Height: 5 ft 10 in (178 cm)
- Weight: 183 lb (83 kg; 13 st 1 lb)
- Position: Right wing
- Shot: Right
- Played for: HC Varese; Rouen; Landsberg EV
- National team: Italy
- NHL draft: Undrafted
- Playing career: 1989–2004

Mario De Bénédictis (born March 28, 1966) is a Canadian born-Italian former professional ice hockey player who played for HC Varese, Rouen and Landsberg EV in European leagues. Upon returning to North America, he played in the semi-Professional hockey league in the province of Quebec.

== Career statistics ==
			Regular season					Playoffs
Season	Team	League	GP	G	A	Pts	PIM	GP	G	A	Pts	PIM
1983–84	Longueuil Chevaliers	QMJHL	2	0	0	0	0	3	0	0	0	0
1984–85	Longueuil Chevaliers	QMJHL	63	36	53	89	55	—	—	—	—	—
1985–86	Longueuil Chevaliers	QMJHL	55	33	48	81	27	—	—	—	—	—
1985–86	Drummondville Voltigeurs	QMJHL	17	8	14	22	7	23	9	9	18	26
1986–87	Longueuil Chevaliers	QMJHL	28	13	16	29	27	20	16	19	35	10
1986–87	McGill University	U Sports	21	15	21	36	24	—	—	—	—	—
1987–88	McGill University	U Sports	17	10	26	36	24	—	—	—	—	—
1988–89	McGill University	U Sports	34	31	54	85	22	—	—	—	—	—
1989–90	HC Auronzo	Italy2	—	—	—	—	—	—	—	—	—	—
1990–91	HC Varese	Italy	34	21	27	48	19	10	2	11	13	8
1991–93	HC Varese	Italy	15	12	14	26	6	—	—	—	—	—
1992–93	HC Varese	Italy	16	10	15	25	11	3	1	2	3	4
1993–94	HC Devils Milano	Italy	23	4	14	18	8	—	—	—	—	—
1994–95	Dragons de Rouen	France	28	13	16	29	20	8	8	5	13	0
1995–96	Dragons de Rouen	France	28	14	24	38	24	9	5	8	13	8
1996–97	Dragons de Rouen	France	31	31	38	69	62	7	6	1	7	28
1996–97	HC Bolzano	Italy	—	—	—	—	—	—	—	—	—	—
1997–98	EV Landsberg	Germany2	39	34	35	69	45	—	—	—	—	—
1997–98	SG Cortina	Italy	4	3	1	4	2	—	—	—	—	—
1998–99	Saint-Laurent Dragons	QSPHL	34	23	41	64	16	—	—	—	—	—
1999–00	Saint-Laurent Dragons	QSPHL	38	18	37	55	44	—	—	—	—	—
2000–01	Saint-Laurent Dragons	QSPHL	38	31	29	60	24	16	12	15	27	4
2001–02	Verdun Dragons	QSPHL	44	22	46	68	40	10	5	9	14	6
2002–03	Verdun Dragons	QSPHL	50	25	54	79	48	7	5	8	13	4
2003–04	Sorel Royaux	QSPHL	18	4	17	21	0	—	—	—	—	—
2003–04	Saint-Jean Mission	QSPHL	29	6	21	27	8	17	2	4	6	2
Italy totals			92	50	71	121	46	13	3	13	16	12
France totals			87	58	78	136	106	24	19	14	33	36
QSPHL totals			204	119	207	326	172	33	22	32	54	14
