= Serge Roberge =

Canadian ice hockey player

- Born: March 31, 1965 (age 59); Quebec City, Quebec, Canada
- Height: 6 ft 1 in (185 cm)
- Weight: 195 lb (88 kg; 13 st 13 lb)
- Position: Right wing
- Shot: Right
- Played for: Quebec Nordiques
- NHL draft: Undrafted
- Playing career: 1985–2005

Serge Roberge (born March 31, 1965) is a Canadian former professional ice hockey player who played nine games in the National Hockey League (NHL) with the Quebec Nordiques during the 1990–91 season. The rest of his career, which lasted from 1985 to 2005, was spent in various minor leagues. He is the brother of former NHL player Mario Roberge.

== Career statistics ==
=== Regular season and playoffs ===
			Regular season					Playoffs
Season	Team	League	GP	G	A	Pts	PIM	GP	G	A	Pts	PIM
1982–83	Quebec Remparts	QMJHL	9	0	0	0	30	—	—	—	—	—
1982–83	Hull Olympiques	QMJHL	23	0	3	3	122	7	0	1	1	16
1983–84	Hull Olympiques	QMJHL	33	0	3	3	131	—	—	—	—	—
1983–84	Drummondville Voltigeurs	QMJHL	25	1	4	5	159	10	0	2	2	105
1984–85	Drummondville Voltigeurs	QMJHL	45	9	17	26	294	12	1	3	4	20
1985–86	St. John's Capitals	NFSHL	2	0	0	0	12	—	—	—	—	—
1985–86	Rivière-du-Loup 3L	RHL	31	6	8	14	180	—	—	—	—	—
1986–87	Virginia Lancers	ACHL	49	9	16	25	353	12	4	2	6	104
1987–88	Port-aux-Basques Jr. Mariners	NFLD	12	5	3	8	—	—	—	—	—	—
1987–88	Sherbrooke Canadiens	AHL	30	0	1	1	130	5	0	0	0	21
1988–89	Sherbrooke Canadiens	AHL	65	5	7	12	352	6	0	1	1	10
1989–90	Sherbrooke Canadiens	AHL	66	8	5	13	343	12	2	0	2	44
1990–91	Quebec Nordiques	NHL	9	0	0	0	24	—	—	—	—	—
1990–91	Halifax Citadels	AHL	52	0	5	5	152	—	—	—	—	—
1991–92	Halifax Citadels	AHL	66	2	8	10	319	—	—	—	—	—
1992–93	Halifax Citadels	AHL	16	2	2	4	34	—	—	—	—	—
1992–93	Utica Devils	AHL	28	0	3	3	85	1	0	0	0	0
1993–94	Cape Breton Oilers	AHL	51	3	5	8	130	1	0	0	0	0
1994–95	Cornwall Aces	AHL	73	0	3	3	342	11	0	0	0	29
1995–96	Rochester Americans	AHL	32	0	1	1	42	—	—	—	—	—
1995–96	Fredericton Canadiens	AHL	14	1	1	2	45	7	0	0	0	10
1996–97	Quebec Rafales	IHL	61	2	4	6	273	—	—	—	—	—
1997–98	Quebec Rafales	IHL	35	2	0	2	115	—	—	—	—	—
1998–99	Pont-Rouge Grand Portneuf	QSPHL	5	1	2	3	23	—	—	—	—	—
1998–99	Mohawk Valley Prowlers	UHL	61	7	4	11	268	—	—	—	—	—
1999–00	Beaupré Caron & Guay	QSPHL	19	3	4	7	155	—	—	—	—	—
1999–00	Mohawk Valley Prowlers	UHL	54	3	7	10	207	7	2	2	4	34
2000–01	Beaupre Aces	QSPHL	1	0	0	0	7	—	—	—	—	—
2000–01	Mohawk Valley Prowlers	UHL	26	2	0	2	124	—	—	—	—	—
2000–01	Phoenix Mustangs	WCHL	17	1	0	1	96	—	—	—	—	—
2001–02	Quebec Aces	QSPHL	32	1	0	1	229	—	—	—	—	—
2002–03	Saguenay Paramédic	QSPHL	28	1	3	4	262	2	0	0	0	15
2003–04	Saint-Georges-de-Beauce	QSMHL	4	0	0	0	14	—	—	—	—	—
2003–04	Saguenay Paramédic	QSMHL	29	1	0	1	205	6	0	0	0	23
2004–05	Saint-Hyacinthe Cousin	LNAH	9	0	1	1	38	—	—	—	—	—
2004–05	Jonquière GCR	LHSSL	15	0	1	1	143	—	—	—	—	—
AHL totals			493	21	41	62	1974	43	2	1	3	114
NHL totals			9	0	0	0	24	—	—	—	—	—
