= Alain Côté (ice hockey, born 1967) =

Canadian ice hockey player

- Born: April 14, 1967 (age 59) Montmagny, Quebec, Canada
- Height: 6 ft 1 in (185 cm)
- Weight: 200 lb (91 kg; 14 st 4 lb)
- Position: Defenceman
- Shot: Right
- Played for: Boston Bruins; Washington Capitals; Montreal Canadiens; Tampa Bay Lightning; Quebec Nordiques
- NHL draft: 31st overall, 1985; Boston Bruins
- Playing career: 1987–2006

Alain R. Gabriel Côté (born April 14, 1967) is a Canadian former professional ice hockey player and inline hockey player.

== Early life ==
Côté was born in Montmagny, Quebec. As a youth, he played in the 1979 and 1980 Quebec International Pee-Wee Hockey Tournaments with a minor ice hockey team from Montmagny.

== Career ==
Côté was drafted in the second round (31st overall) by the Boston Bruins in the 1985 NHL entry draft. His first season in the National Hockey League (NHL) was 1985–86. He played a total of 36 games in his rookie year and had no goals and six assists. Those 32 games marked the most games that he would play in a single NHL season as he spent most of his career playing in the minors and elsewhere.

Côté played for five different NHL clubs during his career. He played for the Boston Bruins (1985–86 to 1988–89), Washington Capitals (1989–90), Montreal Canadiens (1990–91 to 1991–92), Tampa Bay Lightning (1992–93) and Quebec Nordiques (1993–94). During that span, he played a total of 119 games in which he scored 2 goals and 18 assists for 20 points. He also racked up 124 penalty minutes. As well as the NHL, Côté has played in the QMJHL, AHL and IHL. He has also played hockey in Europe and Japan.

In 1996, Côté played 26 games of inline hockey for the Oakland Skates. He had 4 goals and 15 assists for 19 points.

== Career statistics ==
			Regular season					Playoffs
Season	Team	League	GP	G	A	Pts	PIM	GP	G	A	Pts	PIM
1983–84	Quebec Remparts	QMJHL	60	3	17	20	40	5	1	3	4	8
1984–85	Quebec Remparts	QMJHL	68	9	25	34	173	4	0	1	1	12
1985–86	Granby Bisons	QMJHL	22	4	12	16	48	—	—	—	—	—
1985–86	Moncton Golden Flames	AHL	3	0	0	0	0	—	—	—	—	—
1985–86	Boston Bruins	NHL	32	0	6	6	14	—	—	—	—	—
1986–87	Granby Bisons	QMJHL	43	7	24	31	185	4	0	3	3	2
1986–87	Boston Bruins	NHL	3	0	0	0	0	—	—	—	—	—
1987–88	Maine Mariners	AHL	69	9	34	43	108	9	2	4	6	19
1987–88	Boston Bruins	NHL	2	0	0	0	0	—	—	—	—	—
1988–89	Maine Mariners	AHL	37	5	16	21	111	—	—	—	—	—
1988–89	Boston Bruins	NHL	31	2	3	5	51	—	—	—	—	—
1989–90	Baltimore Skipjacks	AHL	57	5	19	24	161	3	0	0	0	9
1989–90	Washington Capitals	NHL	2	0	0	0	7	—	—	—	—	—
1990–91	Fredericton Canadiens	AHL	49	8	19	27	110	—	—	—	—	—
1990–91	Montreal Canadiens	NHL	28	0	6	6	26	11	0	2	2	26
1991–92	Fredericton Canadiens	AHL	20	1	10	11	24	7	0	1	1	4
1991–92	Montreal Canadiens	NHL	13	0	3	3	22	—	—	—	—	—
1992–93	Fredericton Canadiens	AHL	61	10	17	27	83	—	—	—	—	—
1992–93	Atlanta Knights	IHL	8	1	0	1	0	1	0	0	0	0
1992–93	Tampa Bay Lightning	NHL	2	0	0	0	0	—	—	—	—	—
1993–94	Cornwall Aces	AHL	67	10	34	44	80	11	0	2	2	11
1993–94	Quebec Nordiques	NHL	6	0	0	0	4	—	—	—	—	—
1995–96	San Francisco Spiders	IHL	80	5	26	31	133	4	0	0	0	10
1996–97	Quebec Rafales	IHL	76	8	17	25	102	9	0	2	2	30
1997–98	Japan	Intl	38	15	19	34	0	—	—	—	—	—
1999–00	Nuermberg Ice Tigers	DEL	45	6	12	18	114	—	—	—	—	—
2000–01	St. Georges-de-Beauce Garaga	QSPHL	4	1	2	3	8	—	—	—	—	—
2000–01	Tappara Tampere	SM-liiga	44	9	15	24	111	5	0	1	1	27
2001–02	St. Georges-de-Beauce Garaga	QSPHL	43	8	12	20	55	11	1	3	4	14
2002–03	Rivière-du-Loup Promutuel	QSPHL	14	1	7	8	2	4	0	1	1	8
2003–04	Rivière-du-Loup Promutuel	QSPHL	49	4	17	21	87	10	0	4	4	14
2004–05	Quebec RadioX	LNAH	42	6	8	14	64	—	—	—	—	—
2005–06	Trois-Rivieres Caron and Guay	LNAH	3	0	1	1	4	—	—	—	—	—
2005–06	Pont Rouge Grand Portneuf	LNAH	31	5	13	18	42	—	—	—	—	—
2006–07	Saguenay 98.3-FM	LNAH	29	0	8	8	46	—	—	—	—	—
NHL totals			119	2	18	20	124	11	0	2	2	26
