= Charles Poulin =

Canadian ice hockey player

- Born: July 27, 1972 (age 52); Quebec City, QC, Canada
- Height: 6 ft 0 in (183 cm)
- Weight: 209 lb (95 kg; 14 st 13 lb)
- Position: Center
- Shot: Left
- Played for: Saint-Hyacinthe Laser; Fredericton Canadiens; HC Reims; Berlin Capitals; Tallahassee Tiger Sharks; Quebec Rafales; Abilene Aviators; Shreveport Mudbugs; Windsor Papetiers; Windsor Lacroix; Sherbrooke Saint-François
- National team: Canada
- NHL draft: 58th overall, 1990; Montreal Canadiens
- Playing career: 1987–2004

Charles Poulin (born July 27, 1972) is a former ice hockey player who was awarded the CHL Player of the Year award as a member of the Saint-Hyacinthe Laser of the Quebec Major Junior Hockey League, but never played in the National Hockey League. He was born in Quebec, Canada. Poulin played for the Fredericton Canadiens of the American Hockey League and Quebec Rafales of the International Hockey League, as well as a number of smaller teams in North America and Europe. He retired from hockey in 2004.

== Career statistics ==
			Regular season					Playoffs
Season	Team	League	GP	G	A	Pts	PIM	GP	G	A	Pts	PIM
1987–88	Cantons de l'Est Cantonniers	QMAAA	5	0	0	0	—	1	1	0	1	—
1988–89	Cantons de l'Est Cantonniers	QMAAA	42	37	56	93	101	10	4	12	16	—
1989–90	Saint-Hyacinthe Laser	QMJHL	65	39	45	84	132	11	5	8	13	47
1990–91	Saint-Hyacinthe Laser	QMJHL	64	25	46	71	166	4	0	2	2	23
1991–92	Saint-Hyacinthe Laser	QMJHL	69	38	97	135	115	6	2	2	4	20
1992–93	Fredericton Canadiens	AHL	58	12	19	31	99	1	0	0	0	0
1993–94	Fredericton Canadiens	AHL	35	9	15	24	70	—	—	—	—	—
1995–96	Hockey Club de Reims	FRA	26	23	10	33	26	10	4	3	7	34
1995–96	Canada	Intl	2	0	1	1	2	—	—	—	—	—
1996–97	Hockey Club de Reims	FRA	29	23	27	50	82	9	3	3	6	18
1997–98	Berlin Capitals	DEL	23	5	7	12	18	—	—	—	—	—
1997–98	Tallahassee Tiger Sharks	ECHL	5	2	2	4	2	—	—	—	—	—
1997–98	Québec Rafales	IHL	18	1	2	3	33	—	—	—	—	—
1998–99	Abilene Aviators	WPHL	58	41	55	96	136	2	0	1	1	2
1999–2000	Windsor Papetiers	QSPHL	6	8	7	15	14	—	—	—	—	—
1999–2000	Abilene Aviators	WPHL	3	1	1	2	14	—	—	—	—	—
1999–2000	Shreveport Mudbugs	WPHL	27	10	25	35	46	10	6	2	8	32
2000–01	Windsor Papetiers	QSPHL	39	23	38	61	56	3	2	0	2	12
2001–02	Windsor Lacroix	QSPHL	42	26	36	62	65	4	2	1	3	32
2002–03	Windsor Lacroix	QSPHL	50	36	47	83	103	9	3	5	8	28
2003–04	Sherbrooke Saint-François	QSPHL	36	16	23	39	27	2	0	0	0	0
AHL totals			93	21	34	55	169	1	0	0	0	0
FRA totals			55	46	37	83	108	19	7	6	13	52
QSPHL totals			173	109	151	260	265	18	7	6	13	72

Preceded by Eric Lindros	CHL Player of the Year; 1992	Succeeded by Pat Peake
