= Patrick Labrecque =

Canadian ice hockey player and coach

- Born: March 6, 1971 (age 55) LaSalle, Quebec, Canada
- Height: 6 ft 1 in (185 cm)
- Weight: 190 lb (86 kg; 13 st 8 lb)
- Position: Goaltender
- Caught: Left
- Played for: Montreal Canadiens; Neftekhimik Nizhnekamsk
- NHL draft: 90th overall, 1991; Quebec Nordiques
- Playing career: 1995–2005

Joseph Denis Patrick Labrecque (born March 6, 1971) is a Canadian ice hockey coach and former player. Labrecque played two games for the Montreal Canadiens in the 1995–96 season. The rest of his career, which lasted from 1991 to 2005, was mainly spent in the minor leagues

== Biography ==
Lebrecque was born in LaSalle, Quebec. He was drafted in the 1991 NHL entry draft by the Quebec Nordiques. He wore jersey number 31 for the Canadiens. During the 2001–02 QMJHL season, he was a goaltender coach for the Cape Breton Screaming Eagles.

== Career statistics ==
=== Regular season and playoffs ===
			Regular season									Playoffs
Season	Team	League	GP	W	L	T	MIN	GA	SO	GAA	SV%	GP	W	L	MIN	GA	SO	GAA	SV%
1987–88	Laval-Laurentides-Lanaudière Régents	QMAAA	21	17	3	1	1337	85	0	3.82	—	5	3	2	313	24	0	4.60	—
1988–89	St-Jean Castors	QMJHL	30	8	13	1	1417	140	0	5.93	.828	4	0	3	194	17	0	5.25	.882
1989–90	St-Jean Lynx	QMJHL	38	21	24	0	2630	196	1	4.47	.877	—	—	—	—	—	—	—	—
1990–91	St-Jean Lynx	QMJHL	59	17	34	6	3375	216	1	3.84	.882	—	—	—	—	—	—	—	—
1991–92	Halifax Citadels	AHL	29	5	12	8	1570	114	0	4.36	.874	—	—	—	—	—	—	—	—
1992–93	Greensboro Monarchs	ECHL	11	6	3	2	650	31	0	2.86	.896	1	0	1	59	5	0	5.08	—
1992–93	Halifax Citadels	AHL	20	3	12	2	914	76	0	4.99	.857	—	—	—	—	—	—	—	—
1993–94	Cornwall Aces	AHL	4	1	2	0	198	8	1	2.42	.923	—	—	—	—	—	—	—	—
1993–94	Greensboro Monarchs	ECHL	29	17	8	2	1609	89	0	3.32	.895	1	0	0	22	4	0	10.80	—
1994–95	Fredericton Canadiens	AHL	35	15	17	1	1913	104	1	3.26	.895	16	10	6	967	40	1	2.48	.911
1994–95	Wheeling Thunderbirds	ECHL	5	2	3	0	281	22	0	4.69	.847	—	—	—	—	—	—	—	—
1995–96	Montreal Canadiens	NHL	2	0	1	0	98	7	0	4.29	.851	—	—	—	—	—	—	—	—
1995–96	Fredericton Canadiens	AHL	48	23	18	6	2686	153	3	3.42	.902	7	3	3	405	31	0	4.59	.856
1996–97	Fredericton Canadiens	AHL	12	1	7	1	602	31	0	3.09	.908	—	—	—	—	—	—	—	—
1996–97	Quebec Rafales	IHL	9	2	6	0	482	29	0	3.61	.895	—	—	—	—	—	—	—	—
1997–98	Baton Rouge Kingfish	ECHL	34	17	13	4	1935	107	0	3.32	.910	—	—	—	—	—	—	—	—
1997–98	Hershey Bears	AHL	—	—	—	—	—	—	—	—	—	1	0	0	10	0	0	0.00	1.000
1998–99	SC Bietigheim-Bissingen	GER-3	40	—	—	—	2404	124	2	3.09	—	13	—	—	783	47	0	3.60	—
1999–00	Braunlager EHC/Harz	GER-2	11	7	4	0	657	43	0	3.93	—	—	—	—	—	—	—	—	—
1999–00	San Angelo Outlaws	WPHL	8	2	6	0	428	34	0	4.76	.861	—	—	—	—	—	—	—	—
1999–00	Fort Wayne Komets	UHL	7	4	1	0	337	11	1	1.96	.926	1	0	1	59	3	0	3.07	.885
1999–00	Bakersfield Condors	WCHL	5	2	2	1	297	17	0	3.43	.900	4	1	3	200	14	0	4.20	.883
2000–01	Sorel Royaux	QSPHL	33	18	15	0	1962	122	0	3.73	.894	6	1	4	204	22	1	4.01	—
2001–02	Sorel Royaux	QSPHL	39	20	12	3	2302	142	1	3.70	.884	10	4	6	610	46	0	4.52	—
2002–03	Neftekhimik Nizhnekamsk	RSL	3	1	1	1	185	9	1	2.92	.877	—	—	—	—	—	—	—	—
2002–03	Sorel Royaux	QSPHL	24	8	13	2	1334	103	0	4.63	.874	—	—	—	—	—	—	—	—
2003–04	Sorel Royaux	QSPHL	29	10	14	1	1515	101	0	4.00	.885	—	—	—	—	—	—	—	—
2004–05	Cousin de Saint-Hyacinthe	QSPHL	33	—	—	—	—	—	—	—	—	—	—	—	—	—	—	—	—
NHL totals			2	0	1	0	98	7	0	4.29	.851	—	—	—	—	—	—	—	—
