= Jean-Marc Richard (ice hockey) =

Canadian ice hockey player

- Born: October 8, 1966 (age 59) Saint-Raymond, Quebec, Canada
- Height: 5 ft 11 in (180 cm)
- Weight: 178 lb (81 kg; 12 st 10 lb)
- Position: Defence
- Shot: Left
- Played for: Quebec Nordiques
- NHL draft: Undrafted
- Playing career: 1987–2005

Jean-Marc Richard (born October 8, 1966) is a Canadian former professional ice hockey defenceman who played five games in the National Hockey League for the Quebec Nordiques. As a youth, he played in the 1978 and 1979 Quebec International Pee-Wee Hockey Tournaments with a minor ice hockey team based in Pont-Rouge.

== Career statistics ==
			Regular season					Playoffs
Season	Team	League	GP	G	A	Pts	PIM	GP	G	A	Pts	PIM
1982–83	Sainte-Foy Gouverneurs	QMAAA	47	2	7	9	22	5	0	0	0	2
1983–84	Chicoutimi Sagueneens	QMJHL	61	1	20	21	41	—	—	—	—	—
1984–85	Chicoutimi Sagueneens	QMJHL	68	10	61	71	57	14	4	8	12	23
1985–86	Chicoutimi Sagueneens	QMJHL	72	20	87	107	111	9	3	5	8	14
1986–87	Chicoutimi Sagueneens	QMJHL	67	21	81	102	105	16	6	25	31	28
1987–88	Fredericton Express	AHL	68	14	42	56	52	7	2	1	3	4
1987–88	Quebec Nordiques	NHL	4	2	1	3	2	—	—	—	—	—
1988–89	Halifax Citadels	AHL	57	8	25	33	38	4	1	0	1	4
1989–90	Halifax Citadels	AHL	40	1	24	25	38	—	—	—	—	—
1989–90	Quebec Nordiques	NHL	1	0	0	0	0	—	—	—	—	—
1990–91	Halifax Citadels	AHL	80	7	41	48	76	—	—	—	—	—
1990–91	Fort Wayne Komets	IHL	1	0	0	0	0	19	3	9	12	8
1991–92	Fort Wayne Komets	IHL	82	18	68	86	109	7	0	5	5	20
1992–93	San Diego Gulls	IHL	6	1	0	1	4	—	—	—	—	—
1992–93	Fort Wayne Komets	IHL	52	10	33	43	48	12	6	11	17	6
1993–94	Las Vegas Thunder	IHL	59	15	33	48	44	5	0	3	3	0
1994–95	Las Vegas Thunder	IHL	81	16	41	57	76	10	0	3	3	4
1995–96	Las Vegas Thunder	IHL	82	12	40	52	92	15	1	7	8	23
1996–97	Quebec Rafales	IHL	56	8	26	34	31	9	1	1	2	10
1997–98	Frankfurt Lions	DEL	48	4	17	21	40	7	1	2	3	2
1998–99	Frankfurt Lions	DEL	49	8	18	26	74	8	1	0	1	12
1999–2000	Frankfurt Lions	DEL	56	4	23	27	36	5	0	0	0	0
2000–01	Frankfurt Lions	DEL	40	6	16	22	45	—	—	—	—	—
2001–02	WSV Sterzing Broncos	ITA	20	0	6	6	6	—	—	—	—	—
2001–02	Pont-Rouge Caron & Guay	QSPHL	14	5	3	8	17	—	—	—	—	—
2002–03	Pont-Rouge Caron & Guay	QSPHL	50	7	35	42	42	16	2	12	14	10
2003–04	Pont-Rouge Caron & Guay	QSMHL	44	20	34	54	45	10	2	4	6	2
2004–05	Trois-Rivières Caron & Guay	LNAH	19	2	4	6	24	—	—	—	—	—
AHL totals			245	30	132	162	204	11	3	1	4	8
NHL totals			5	2	1	3	2	—	—	—	—	—
IHL totals			419	80	241	321	404	77	11	39	50	71
