= Mario Roberge =

Canadian ice hockey player

- Born: January 23, 1964 (age 61) Quebec City, Quebec, Canada
- Height: 5 ft 11 in (180 cm)
- Weight: 185 lb (84 kg; 13 st 3 lb)
- Position: Left wing
- Shot: Left
- Played for: Montreal Canadiens
- NHL draft: Undrafted
- Playing career: 1985–2005

Joseph Mario Roberge (born January 23, 1964) is a Canadian former professional ice hockey forward who played 112 games in the National Hockey League (NHL) for the Montreal Canadiens between 1990 and 1995.

== Playing career ==
Roberge was born in Quebec City, Quebec. As a youth, he played in the 1977 Quebec International Pee-Wee Hockey Tournament with a minor ice hockey team from Quebec City.

Roberge started his NHL career with the Montreal Canadiens, in 1991. He played his entire career with Montreal and left after the 1995 season. He won one Stanley Cup, with Montreal, in 1993, his most successful season; when he played a career-high 50 games, scored four goals and added four assists. Three of his goals were game-winners. He also added a career-high 142 minutes in penalties. He played three playoff games, helping the Canadiens win their 24th Stanley Cup. Roberge was mostly known for his physical play and his fighting abilities. He earned 314 penalty minutes in 112 NHL games.

He is the brother of former NHL player Serge Roberge.

== Career statistics ==
=== Regular season and playoffs ===
			Regular season					Playoffs
Season	Team	League	GP	G	A	Pts	PIM	GP	G	A	Pts	PIM
1981–82	Quebec Remparts	QMJHL	8	0	3	3	2	—	—	—	—	—
1982–83	Quebec Remparts	QMJHL	69	3	27	30	153	—	—	—	—	—
1983–84	Quebec Remparts	QMJHL	60	12	28	40	253	5	0	1	1	22
1984–85	Chicoutimi Sagueneens	QMJHL	11	3	6	9	41	—	—	—	—	—
1985–86	St. John's Capitals	NFSHL	2	1	0	1	2	—	—	—	—	—
1986–87	Virginia Lancers	ACHL	52	25	43	68	178	12	5	9	14	62
1987–88	Port-aux-Basques Mariners	NFSHL	37	24	65	89	152	—	—	—	—	—
1988–89	Sherbrooke Canadiens	AHL	58	4	9	13	249	6	0	2	2	8
1989–90	Sherbrooke Canadiens	AHL	73	13	27	40	247	12	5	2	7	53
1990–91	Montreal Canadiens	NHL	5	0	0	0	21	12	0	0	0	24
1990–91	Fredericton Canadiens	AHL	68	12	27	39	365	2	0	2	2	5
1991–92	Montreal Canadiens	NHL	20	2	1	3	62	—	—	—	—	—
1991–92	Fredericton Canadiens	AHL	6	1	2	3	20	7	0	2	2	20
1992–93	Montreal Canadiens	NHL	50	4	4	8	142	3	0	0	0	0
1993–94	Montreal Canadiens	NHL	28	1	2	3	55	—	—	—	—	—
1994–95	Montreal Canadiens	NHL	9	0	0	0	34	—	—	—	—	—
1994–95	Fredericton Canadiens	AHL	28	8	12	20	91	6	1	1	2	6
1995–96	Fredericton Canadiens	AHL	74	9	24	33	205	4	0	2	2	14
1996–97	Quebec Rafales	IHL	68	8	17	25	256	5	0	1	1	5
1998–99	Garaga de Saint-Georges	QSPHL	34	5	24	29	214	—	—	—	—	—
1999–00	Garaga de Saint-Georges	QSPHL	26	5	22	27	106	—	—	—	—	—
1999–00	Mohawk Valley Prowlers	UHL	36	7	14	21	100	7	0	3	3	27
2000–01	St. Georges-de-Beauce Garaga	QSPHL	43	8	15	23	129	20	0	7	7	40
2001–02	Quebec Aces	QSPHL	17	5	7	12	93	—	—	—	—	—
2004–05	St. Hyacinthe Cousin	LNAH	10	0	4	4	24	—	—	—	—	—
AHL totals			307	47	101	148	1177	37	6	11	17	106
NHL totals			112	7	7	14	314	15	0	0	0	24
