= Daniel Guérard =

Canadian ice hockey player (born 1974)

- Born: April 9, 1974 (age 52) Montreal, Quebec, Canada
- Height: 6 ft 4 in (193 cm)
- Weight: 211 lb (96 kg; 15 st 1 lb)
- Position: Right wing
- Shot: Right
- Played for: Ottawa Senators
- NHL draft: 98th overall, 1992; Ottawa Senators
- Playing career: 1994–2004

Daniel Guérard (born April 9, 1974) is a Canadian former professional ice hockey player. A product of the Quebec Major Junior Hockey League, he was selected by the Ottawa Senators of the National Hockey League (NHL) in the fifth round, 98th overall, of the 1992 NHL entry draft. He briefly played with the Senators in the 1994–95 season, but spent the majority of his career in the American Hockey League or leagues in Europe. He eventually returned to his home province of Quebec, where he played semi-professional hockey for eight season before retiring in 2005.

== Playing career ==
=== Amateur ===
As a youth, Guérard played in the 1987 and 1988 Quebec International Pee-Wee Hockey Tournaments with a minor ice hockey team from Verdun, Quebec. He began his major junior hockey career when he was selected by the Victoriaville Tigres of the Quebec Major Junior Hockey League (QMJHL) in the first round, 11th overall, in the 1990 QMJHL entry draft. He made his QMJHL debut in the 1991–92 season playing on the right wing with the Tigres, appearing in 31 games, scoring five goals and 16 assists for 21 points. He returned to Victoriaville for the 1992–93 season, and playing with Alexandre Daigle, he was selected to play in the Canadian Hockey League all-star game. In 47 games with the Tigres, he put up 26 goals and 49 points.

Guérard was traded to Verdun Collège Français that season where he scored five goals and eight points in eleven games. Verdun qualified for the for playoffs but were eliminated in four games in the quarterfinals best-of-seven series by the Laval Titan. In the four games, Guérard marked one goal and two points. In his first full season with Verdun in the 1993–94 season, he posted 31 goals and 65 points in 54 games. He was invited to tryout for Canada's junior team ahead of the 1994 World Junior Championship in December, but did not make the cut. Verdun once again made the playoffs, and faced the Drummondville Voltigeurs in their opening best-of-seven series. Drummondville swept them in four games, and Guérard scored three goals and four points in the series.

=== Professional ===
==== Ottawa Senators ====
Guérard was drafted by the Ottawa Senators of the National Hockey League (NHL) in the fifth round, 98th overall, of the 1992 NHL entry draft. After his junior team had finished their season in April 1993, Guérard joined Ottawa's American Hockey League (AHL) affiliate, the New Haven Senators, for the final two games of the season. He attended Ottawa's 1993 training camp, but was cut in October and sent back to the QMJHL before the season began. On April 1, 1994, he signed his first professional contract, agreeing to terms with Ottawa's new AHL affiliate, the Prince Edward Island Senators. Guérard made three appearances for Prince Edward Island in the 1993–94 season, going scoreless.

Going into the 1994–95 season, Guérard was identified as one of Ottawa's top prospects by general manager Randy Sexton. He was assigned to the AHL to start the season and played on a line dubbed the "French Connection" with Michel Picard and Steve Larouche. In 68 games for Prince Edward Island, recording 20 goals and 42 points. Prince Edward Island qualified for the playoffs and advanced to the second round versus the Fredericton Canadiens. The Canadiens beat the Senators in six games of their best-of-seven series. In eight playoff games, Guérard recorded one assist. He was recalled by Ottawa on April 27, 1995, alongside Picard and defenceman Darren Rumble after a series of injuries to Ottawa's lineup. He made his NHL debut that night against the Tampa Bay Lightning. He played in one more game, going scoreless, before being returned to the AHL.

Assigned to Prince Edward Island for the 1995–96 season, Guérard struggled and tallied only three goals and ten points in 42 games. Ottawa assigned him to their new AHL affiliate, the Worcester IceCats, for the 1996–97 season where he scored eight goals and 16 games in 49 games. For his participation in an altercation on the ice in a game against the Hershey Bears on November 23, 1996, Guérard was suspended by the AHL for two games on November 27. At the end of the season, Guérard became an unrestricted free agent.

==== Europe ====
Guérard signed with VEU Feldkirch of the Austrian Hockey League (AUT) for the 1997–98 season where in 16 games, he scored eight goals and 15 points. VEU Feldkirch won the 1998 European Hockey League final, defeating Dynamo Moscow to take the title. The team also won the Alpenliga title that season, along with the AUT title.

He then signed with HK Jesenice of the Slovenian Ice Hockey League for their 1997–98 season. He appeared in 28 games for them, tallying 24 goals and 54 points. Jesenice made the playoffs and in 11 playoff games, Guérard scored 14 goals and 15 points. He split the 1998–99 season between WSV Sterzing – SSI Vipiteno Broncos of the Italian Serie A and Alpenliga, where he appeared 16 times, scoring 11 games and 20 points. He then moved on to Grenoble of the French Ligue Magnus, where he played 11 games, recording three goals and ten points.

==== Semi-professional ====
He returned to Quebec in 1999 to play in the Quebec Semi-Pro Hockey League where he played for the Rapides de LaSalle for four seasons followed by spells with the Sorel Royaux and the St. Jean Mission before retiring in 2004.

== Career statistics ==
=== Regular season and playoffs ===
			Regular season					Playoffs
Season	Team	League	GP	G	A	Pts	PIM	GP	G	A	Pts	PIM
1989–90	Lac St-Louis Lions	QMAAA	32	6	7	13	30	—	—	—	—	—
1990–91	Verdun College-Francais	CEGEP	—	—	—	—	—	—	—	—	—	—
1991–92	Victoriaville Tigres	QMJHL	31	5	16	21	68	—	—	—	—	—
1992–93	Victoriaville Tigres	QMJHL	47	26	23	49	102	—	—	—	—	—
1992–93	Verdun College-Francais	QMJHL	11	5	3	8	29	4	1	1	2	17
1992–93	New Haven Senators	AHL	2	2	1	3	0	—	—	—	—	—
1993–94	Verdun College-Francais	QMJHL	54	31	34	65	169	4	3	1	4	4
1993–94	PEI Senators	AHL	3	0	0	0	17	—	—	—	—	—
1994–95	Ottawa Senators	NHL	2	0	0	0	0	—	—	—	—	—
1994–95	PEI Senators	AHL	68	20	22	42	95	8	0	1	1	16
1995–96	PEI Senators	AHL	42	3	7	10	56	—	—	—	—	—
1996–97	Worcester IceCats	AHL	49	8	8	16	50	—	—	—	—	—
1997–98	VEU Feldkirch	AUT	16	8	17	25	41	—	—	—	—	—
1997–98	HK Jesenice	SLO	28	24	30	54	—	11	14	1	15	—
1998–99	WSV Sterzing Broncos	ALP	16	11	9	20	30	—	—	—	—	—
1998–99	Grenoble	FRA	11	3	7	10	20	—	—	—	—	—
1999–00	Rapides de LaSalle	QSPHL	38	19	33	52	53	20	10	11	21	41
2000–01	Rapides de LaSalle	QSPHL	41	13	24	37	94	5	0	4	4	8
2001–02	Rapides de LaSalle	QSPHL	40	20	24	44	88	—	—	—	—	—
2002–03	Rapides de LaSalle	QSPHL	14	7	3	10	43	—	—	—	—	—
2002–03	Royaux de Sorel	QSPHL	19	7	13	20	33	4	1	3	4	2
2003–04	Royaux de Sorel	QSPHL	8	2	5	7	35	—	—	—	—	—
2003–04	Mission de Saint-Jean	QSPHL	29	13	8	21	90	15	1	1	2	33
AHL totals			164	33	38	71	218	8	0	1	1	16
NHL totals			2	0	0	0	0	—	—	—	—	—

== Sources ==
- Chaimovitch, Jason, ed. (2024). 2024–2025 American Hockey League Official Guide & Record Book. Springfield, Massachusetts: American Hockey League. OCLC 22147888.
