= Yves Beaudoin =

Canadian ice hockey player (born 1965)

- Born: January 7, 1965 (age 61) Pointe-aux-Trembles, Quebec, Canada
- Height: 5 ft 11 in (180 cm)
- Weight: 180 lb (82 kg; 12 st 12 lb)
- Position: Defence
- Shot: Right
- Played for: Washington Capitals; EV Innsbruck; Nottingham Panthers
- NHL draft: 195th overall, 1983; Washington Capitals
- Playing career: 1990; 1996–2002

Yves Beaudoin (born January 7, 1965) is a Canadian former professional ice hockey defenceman. He played 11 games in the National Hockey League with the Washington Capitals from 1985 to 1987. The rest of his career, which lasted from 1985 to 1990, was mainly spent in the minor leagues. Beaudoin was born in Pointe-aux-Trembles, Quebec. He was selected by the Capitals in the 1983 NHL entry draft. He retired from professional hockey in 1990. In 1996, he came out of retirement to play for the Quebec Semi-Pro Hockey League before retiring again in 2002.

== Career statistics ==
=== Regular season and playoffs ===
			Regular season					Playoffs
Season	Team	League	GP	G	A	Pts	PIM	GP	G	A	Pts	PIM
1980–81	Bourassa Angevins	QMAAA	48	18	31	49	—	—	—	—	—	—
1981–82	Hull Olympiques	QMJHL	50	2	18	20	39	14	0	3	3	0
1982–83	Hull Olympiques	QMJHL	6	1	2	3	9	—	—	—	—	—
1982–83	Shawinigan Cataractes	QMJHL	56	11	23	34	51	10	2	2	4	18
1983–84	Shawinigan Cataractes	QMJHL	68	14	45	59	89	6	1	6	7	2
1984–85	Shawinigan Cataractes	QMJHL	58	20	37	57	78	9	4	3	7	31
1984–85	Shawinigan Cataractes	M-Cup	—	—	—	—	—	4	0	1	1	6
1985–86	Washington Capitals	NHL	4	0	0	0	0	—	—	—	—	—
1985–86	Binghamton Whalers	AHL	48	5	12	17	36	6	1	2	3	0
1986–87	Washington Capitals	NHL	6	0	0	0	5	—	—	—	—	—
1986–87	Binghamton Whalers	AHL	63	11	25	36	35	11	0	1	1	6
1987–88	Washington Capitals	NHL	1	0	0	0	0	—	—	—	—	—
1987–88	Binghamton Whalers	AHL	64	11	39	50	56	4	0	2	2	6
1988–89	EV Innsbruck	AUT	46	9	26	35	—	—	—	—	—	—
1989–90	Nottingham Panthers	BHL	14	11	15	26	12	—	—	—	—	—
1996–97	Rapides de Lachute	QSPHL	12	0	6	6	8	—	—	—	—	—
1997–98	Rapides de Lachute	QSPHL	32	5	22	27	33	23	4	18	22	8
1998–99	Rapides de Lachute	QSPHL	31	16	14	30	15	—	—	—	—	—
1999–00	Rapides de LaSalle	QSPHL	35	7	30	37	8	19	6	19	25	12
2000–01	Rapides de LaSalle	QSPHL	19	2	8	10	8	—	—	—	—	—
2000–01	Chiefs de Laval	QSPHL	6	0	4	4	4	—	—	—	—	—
2000–01	Blitz de Granby	QSPHL	12	2	11	13	0	—	—	—	—	—
2001–02	Blitz de Granby	QSPHL	41	10	15	25	36	—	—	—	—	—
QSPHL totals			188	42	110	152	112	42	10	37	47	20
NHL totals			11	0	0	0	5	—	—	—	—	—

=== International ===
Medal record

Representing Canada

World Junior Championships
Gold medal – first place	1985 Finland	

Year	Team	Event	GP	G	A	Pts	PIM
1985	Canada	WJC	7	0	3	3	4
Junior totals			7	0	3	3	4
