= Daniel Poudrier =

Canadian ice hockey player (1964–2026)

- Born: February 15, 1964 Thetford Mines, Quebec, Canada
- Died: June 29, 2026 (aged 62) Thetford Mines, Quebec, Canada
- Height: 6 ft 2 in (188 cm)
- Weight: 183 lb (83 kg; 13 st 1 lb)
- Position: Defense
- Shot: Left
- Played for: Quebec Nordiques; Mont-Blanc HC; Wiener EV; Dragons de Rouen; Eisbären Berlin
- NHL draft: 131st overall, 1982; Quebec Nordiques
- Playing career: 1984–2005

Daniel Poudrier (February 15, 1964 – June 29, 2026) was a Canadian professional ice hockey player who played 25 games in the National Hockey League for the Quebec Nordiques over three seasons between 1986 and 1987. The rest of his career, which lasted from 1984 to 2005, was spent in the minor leagues and Europe.

== Biography ==
Poudrier was born in Thetford Mines, Quebec on February 15, 1964. As a youth, he played in the 1976 and 1977 Quebec International Pee-Wee Hockey Tournaments with a minor ice hockey team from Thetford Mines.

After retiring from hockey, Poudrier became a city councillor (District 10) in Thetford Mines.

Poudrier died on June 29, 2026, at the age of 62.

== Career statistics ==
=== Regular season and playoffs ===
			Regular season					Playoffs
Season	Team	League	GP	G	A	Pts	PIM	GP	G	A	Pts	PIM
1979–80	Cantons de l'Est Cantonniers	QMAAA	32	4	13	17	8	6	0	1	1	0
1980–81	Cantons de l'Est Cantonniers	QMAAA	26	8	8	16	18	—	—	—	—	—
1981–82	Shawinigan Cataractes	QMJHL	64	6	18	24	26	14	1	1	2	2
1982–83	Shawinigan Cataractes	QMJHL	67	6	28	34	31	10	1	2	3	2
1983–84	Shawinigan Cataractes	QMJHL	12	2	4	6	7	—	—	—	—	—
1983–84	Drummondville Voltigeurs	QMJHL	52	5	24	29	8	10	2	3	5	4
1984–85	Muskegon Lumberjacks	IHL	82	9	30	39	12	17	2	6	8	2
1984–85	Fredericton Express	AHL	1	0	0	0	0	—	—	—	—	—
1985–86	Quebec Nordiques	NHL	13	1	5	6	10	—	—	—	—	—
1985–86	Fredericton Express	AHL	65	5	26	31	9	6	0	3	3	0
1986–87	Quebec Nordiques	NHL	6	0	0	0	0	—	—	—	—	—
1986–87	Fredericton Express	AHL	69	8	18	26	11	—	—	—	—	—
1987–88	Quebec Nordiques	NHL	6	0	0	0	0	—	—	—	—	—
1987–88	Fredericton Express	AHL	66	13	30	43	18	11	2	5	7	2
1988–89	Halifax Citadels	AHL	7	2	4	6	2	3	0	0	0	2
1988–89	Avalanche du Mont-Blanc	FRA	18	7	5	12	8	—	—	—	—	—
1989–90	Wiener EV	AUT	11	5	6	11	6	—	—	—	—	—
1990–91	EV Füssen	GER-2	47	30	42	72	22	—	—	—	—	—
1991–92	St. Thomas Wildcats	CoHL	9	1	1	2	0	—	—	—	—	—
1991–92	EHC Klostersee	GER-3	17	20	16	36	6	—	—	—	—	—
1992–93	EHC Klostersee	GEr-3	48	34	31	65	23	—	—	—	—	—
1993–94	Dragons de Rouen	FRA	10	3	10	13	2	7	3	2	5	2
1994–95	EC Wolfsburg	GER-2	32	20	31	51	8	5	2	1	3	0
1995–96	Eisbären Berlin	DEL	27	5	6	11	2	—	—	—	—	—
1996–97	TSV Erding	GER-2	59	23	31	54	38	—	—	—	—	—
1997–98	TSV Erding	GER-2	56	10	28	38	8	2	0	1	1	0
1998–99	TSV Erding	GER-2	31	3	14	17	8	—	—	—	—	—
1999–00	EV Landshut	GER-3	61	12	23	35	8	—	—	—	—	—
2000–01	Thetford Mines Prolab	QSPHL	44	12	27	39	24	7	1	4	5	0
2001–02	Thetford Mines Prolab	QSPHL	44	12	28	40	2	21	6	17	23	2
2002–03	Thetford Mines Prolab	QSPHL	49	15	35	50	16	22	3	10	13	2
2003–04	Thetford Mines Prolab	QSPHL	49	10	24	34	5	15	4	6	10	2
2004–05	Thetford Mines Prolab	LNAH	4	0	2	2	0	—	—	—	—	—
AHL totals			208	28	78	106	40	20	2	8	10	4
NHL totals			25	1	5	6	10	—	—	—	—	—
