= Bobby Dollas =

Canadian ice hockey player (born 1965)

- Born: January 31, 1965 (age 61) Montreal, Quebec, Canada
- Height: 6 ft 2 in (188 cm)
- Weight: 220 lb (100 kg; 15 st 10 lb)
- Position: Defence
- Shot: Left
- Played for: NHL; Winnipeg Jets; Quebec Nordiques; Detroit Red Wings; Mighty Ducks of Anaheim; Edmonton Oilers; Pittsburgh Penguins; Calgary Flames; Ottawa Senators; San Jose Sharks
- National team: Canada
- NHL draft: 14th overall, 1983; Winnipeg Jets
- Playing career: 1983–2006

Bobby H. Dollas (born January 31, 1965) is a Canadian former professional ice hockey player. Dollas played defence for the Winnipeg Jets, Quebec Nordiques, Detroit Red Wings, Mighty Ducks of Anaheim, Edmonton Oilers, Pittsburgh Penguins, Calgary Flames, Ottawa Senators and San Jose Sharks.

== Playing career ==
As a youth, Dollas played in the 1978 Quebec International Pee-Wee Hockey Tournament with a minor ice hockey team from Châteauguay.

Dollas played junior hockey with the Laval Voisins and scored 61 points as a major junior rookie in 1982-83. During the 1983-84 season, Dollas made his NHL debut, playing in a single game with Winnipeg before being returned to junior and scoring 45 points in 54 games for the Voisins. The Voisins were the QMJHL champions that year, but they failed to win the Memorial Cup. Drafted 14th overall by the Jets in the 1983 NHL entry draft. In 1993 was picked up by the Anaheim Mighty Ducks (expansion). Dollas played 646 regular season NHL games, scoring 42 goals and 96 assists for 138 points and collecting 467 penalty minutes in a career which spanned 16 seasons. Dollas won a gold medal with Canada at the 1985 World Junior Championships and was a tournament All-Star. And also won a gold medal in the 1994 World Championship in Italy.

Dollas was a radio commentator with TSN 690 on Montreal Canadiens broadcasts, and an instructor with PSL Hockey in Laval, Quebec. In 2021 was named assistant coach of the Lausanne HC in the Switzerland National League. In early 2023 went back home and was named assistant coach of Laval VC (QJAAAHL). At the start of season 23/24 was named head coach of the Montreal Phoenix (QJAAAHL). In Nov 2025 accepted an associate head coach position with Terrebonne Cobras (QJAAAHL) till the end of the 2026 season. He is currently head coach of Feltre HC (IHL) in Italy.

== Career statistics ==
=== Regular season and playoffs ===
			Regular season					Playoffs
Season	Team	League	GP	G	A	Pts	PIM	GP	G	A	Pts	PIM
1981–82	Lac-St-Louis Lions	QMAAA	44	9	31	40	138	11	2	8	10	20
1982–83	Laval Voisins	QMJHL	63	16	45	61	144	11	5	5	10	23
1983–84	Winnipeg Jets	NHL	1	0	0	0	0	—	—	—	—	—
1983–84	Laval Voisins	QMJHL	54	12	33	45	80	14	1	8	9	23
1983–84	Laval Voisins	MC	—	—	—	—	—	3	0	1	1	7
1984–85	Winnipeg Jets	NHL	9	0	0	0	0	—	—	—	—	—
1984–85	Laval Voisins	QMJHL	1	0	0	0	2	—	—	—	—	—
1984–85	Sherbrooke Canadiens	AHL	8	1	3	4	4	17	3	6	9	17
1985–86	Sherbrooke Canadiens	AHL	25	4	7	11	29	—	—	—	—	—
1985–86	Winnipeg Jets	NHL	46	0	5	5	66	3	0	0	0	2
1986–87	Sherbrooke Canadiens	AHL	75	6	18	24	87	16	2	4	6	13
1987–88	Moncton Hawks	AHL	26	4	10	14	20	—	—	—	—	—
1987–88	Quebec Nordiques	NHL	9	0	0	0	2	—	—	—	—	—
1987–88	Fredericton Express	AHL	33	4	8	12	27	15	2	2	4	24
1988–89	Halifax Citadels	AHL	57	5	19	24	65	4	1	0	1	14
1988–89	Quebec Nordiques	NHL	16	0	3	3	16	—	—	—	—	—
1989–90	Canada	Intl	68	8	29	37	60	—	—	—	—	—
1990–91	Detroit Red Wings	NHL	56	3	5	8	20	7	1	0	1	13
1991–92	Adirondack Red Wings	AHL	19	1	6	7	33	18	7	4	11	22
1991–92	Detroit Red Wings	NHL	27	3	1	4	20	2	0	1	1	0
1992–93	Adirondack Red Wings	AHL	64	7	36	43	54	11	3	8	11	8
1992–93	Detroit Red Wings	NHL	6	0	0	0	2	—	—	—	—	—
1993–94	Mighty Ducks of Anaheim	NHL	77	9	11	20	55	—	—	—	—	—
1994–95	Mighty Ducks of Anaheim	NHL	45	7	13	20	12	—	—	—	—	—
1995–96	Mighty Ducks of Anaheim	NHL	82	8	22	30	64	—	—	—	—	—
1996–97	Mighty Ducks of Anaheim	NHL	79	4	14	18	55	11	0	0	0	4
1997–98	Mighty Ducks of Anaheim	NHL	22	0	1	1	27	—	—	—	—	—
1997–98	Edmonton Oilers	NHL	30	2	5	7	22	11	0	0	0	16
1998–99	Pittsburgh Penguins	NHL	70	2	8	10	60	13	1	0	1	6
1999–2000	Calgary Flames	NHL	49	3	7	10	28	—	—	—	—	—
1999–2000	Ottawa Senators	NHL	1	0	0	0	0	—	—	—	—	—
1999–2000	Long Beach Ice Dogs	IHL	13	2	4	6	8	—	—	—	—	—
2000–01	Manitoba Moose	IHL	8	1	2	3	2	—	—	—	—	—
2000–01	San Jose Sharks	NHL	16	1	1	2	14	—	—	—	—	—
2000–01	Pittsburgh Penguins	NHL	5	0	0	0	4	—	—	—	—	—
2001–02	Laval Chiefs	QSPHL	12	3	7	10	10	16	6	9	15	17
2002–03	Laval Chiefs	QSPHL	50	11	20	31	71	18	3	11	14	54
2003–04	Laval Chiefs	QSPHL	21	2	7	9	20	—	—	—	—	—
2003–04	St. Jean Mission	QSPHL	23	2	9	11	23	17	5	8	13	36
2004–05	Sorel-Tracy Mission	LNAH	31	5	13	18	12	—	—	—	—	—
2005–06	Sorel-Tracy Mission	LNAH	31	3	12	15	37	—	—	—	—	—
NHL totals			646	42	96	138	467	47	2	1	3	41
AHL totals			277	32	107	139	329	81	18	24	42	98

=== International ===
Medal record

Representing Canada

World Championships
Gold medal – first place	1994 Italy	

World Junior Championships
Gold medal – first place	1985 Finland	

Year	Team	Event	GP	G	A	Pts	PIM
1985	Canada	WJC	7	0	2	2	12
1994	Canada	WC	8	0	1	1	4
Junior totals			7	0	2	2	12
Senior totals			8	0	1	1	4

Preceded by Andrew McBain	Winnipeg Jets first-round draft pick 1983	Succeeded by Ryan Stewart
