= Daniel Shank =

- Born: May 12, 1967 (age 58) Montreal, Quebec, Canada
- Height: 5 ft 11 in (180 cm)
- Weight: 200 lb (91 kg; 14 st 4 lb)
- Position: Right wing
- Shot: Right
- Played for: Detroit Red Wings; Hartford Whalers
- NHL draft: Undrafted
- Playing career: 1988–2006

Daniel Shank (born May 12, 1967) is a Canadian former professional ice hockey player who played in the National Hockey League.

After playing four seasons in the Quebec Major Junior Hockey League, Shank made his professional debut with the Adirondack Red Wings of the American Hockey League in the 1988–89 season. After scoring just 25 points in the AHL regular season, he tallied 19 in the Calder Cup playoffs, including 11 goals, helping the Red Wings win the AHL championship.

He made his NHL debut with Detroit the next season, scoring 24 points in 57 games. After appearing in just seven NHL games in the 1990–91 season, though, and beginning the 1991–92 season back in Adirondack, Shank was traded to the Hartford Whalers in exchange for Chris Tancill. He appeared in 13 regular season and 5 playoff games for the Whalers that season.

Shank then began an extensive International Hockey League career, spending the next six seasons there exclusively. He had much scoring success in the IHL, scoring 39 goals with the San Diego Gulls in 1992–93, 48 with the Minnesota Moose and Detroit Vipers in 1994–95, 50 with the Detroit Vipers and Las Vegas Thunder in 1995–96, and 39 with the San Antonio Dragons in 1997–98.

During his IHL days, Shank also played in Roller Hockey International, scoring 325 points in five seasons.

After appearing in nine games with the Frankfurt Lions of the Deutsche Eishockey Liga in 1998–99, Shank returned to North America to play in lower minor leagues. He spent three seasons in the West Coast Hockey League, two in the Quebec Semi-Pro Hockey League, and, most recently, the 2005–06 season in the LNAH with the Verdun Dragons, where he played four games in his last professional action.

Shank also was the head coach of the Central Hockey League's Border City Bandits for part of the 2000–01 season, with his team winning just one of the 13 games for which he was behind the bench.

In his NHL career, Shank appeared in 77 games. He scored 13 goals and added 14 assists. He also played in five games for Hartford during the 1992 Stanley Cup Playoffs, recording no points.

In his IHL career, Shank appeared in 470 games. He scored 240 goals and added 282 assists.

Shank has 4 children, 3 daughters Jessica, Daniella and Kassandra Shank, and one son- Tyson Shank , born in 2010, is a right-handed defenseman.

== Career statistics ==
			Regular season					Playoffs
Season	Team	League	GP	G	A	Pts	PIM	GP	G	A	Pts	PIM
1984–85	Longueuil Chevaliers	QMJHL	55	26	28	54	146	—	—	—	—	—
1985–86	Longueuil Chevaliers	QMJHL	7	3	4	7	19	—	—	—	—	—
1985–86	Chicoutimi Sagueneens	QMJHL	42	32	33	65	150	—	—	—	—	—
1985–86	Shawinigan Cataractes	QMJHL	9	2	6	8	34	—	—	—	—	—
1986–87	Laval Titan	QMJHL	37	23	35	58	269	—	—	—	—	—
1986–87	Hull Olympiques	QMJHL	9	3	8	11	56	—	—	—	—	—
1987–88	Hull Olympiques	QMJHL	52	31	42	73	343	19	10	19	29	106
1988–89	Adirondack Red Wings	AHL	42	5	20	25	113	17	11	8	19	102
1989–90	Detroit Red Wings	NHL	57	11	13	24	143	—	—	—	—	—
1989–90	Adirondack Red Wings	AHL	14	8	8	16	36	—	—	—	—	—
1990–91	Detroit Red Wings	NHL	7	0	1	1	14	—	—	—	—	—
1990–91	Adirondack Red Wings	AHL	60	26	49	75	278	—	—	—	—	—
1991–92	Hartford Whalers	NHL	13	2	0	2	18	5	0	0	0	22
1991–92	Adirondack Red Wings	AHL	27	13	21	34	112	—	—	—	—	—
1991–92	Springfield Indians	AHL	31	9	19	28	83	8	8	0	8	48
1992–93	San Diego Gulls	IHL	77	39	53	92	495	14	5	10	15	131
1993–94	San Diego Gulls	IHL	63	27	36	63	273	—	—	—	—	—
1993–94	Phoenix Roadrunners	IHL	7	4	6	10	26	—	—	—	—	—
1994–95	Minnesota Moose	IHL	19	4	11	15	30	—	—	—	—	—
1994–95	Detroit Vipers	IHL	54	44	27	71	142	5	2	2	4	6
1995–96	Las Vegas Thunder	IHL	49	36	29	65	191	—	—	—	—	—
1995–96	Detroit Vipers	IHL	29	14	19	33	96	12	4	5	9	38
1996–97	San Antonio Dragons	IHL	81	33	58	91	293	9	3	3	6	32
1997–98	San Antonio Dragons	IHL	80	39	43	82	141	—	—	—	—	—
1998–99	Phoenix Mustangs	WCHL	17	13	16	29	26	—	—	—	—	—
1998–99	Frankfurt Lions	DEL	9	2	5	7	12	8	3	2	5	33
1999–00	Phoenix Mustangs	WCHL	48	23	40	63	198	12	6	6	12	38
2000–01	Border City Bandits	CHL	9	2	7	9	14	—	—	—	—	—
2000–01	Phoenix Mustangs	WCHL	27	14	17	31	145	—	—	—	—	—
2000–01	San Diego Gulls	WCHL	7	2	4	6	6	13	6	4	10	55
2002–03	Saint-Jean Mission	QSPHL	2	0	2	2	4	—	—	—	—	—
2002–03	Saguenay Paramedic	QSPHL	46	19	44	63	112	4	0	2	2	8
2003–04	Thetford Mines Prolab	QSPHL	—	—	—	—	—	2	1	0	1	2
2005–06	Verdun Dragons	LNAH	4	1	0	1	2	—	—	—	—	—
NHL totals			77	13	14	27	175	5	0	0	0	22
AHL totals			174	61	117	178	622	25	19	8	27	150
IHL totals			459	240	282	522	1,687	40	14	20	34	207
