= André Racicot =

- Born: June 9, 1969 (age 56) Rouyn-Noranda, Quebec, Canada
- Height: 5 ft 11 in (180 cm)
- Weight: 165 lb (75 kg; 11 st 11 lb)
- Position: Goaltender
- Caught: Left
- Played for: Montreal Canadiens; Basingstoke Bison; Neftekhimik Nizhnekamsk
- NHL draft: 83rd overall, 1989; Montreal Canadiens
- Playing career: 1989–2004

André Racicot, Jr., (born June 9, 1969) is a Canadian former professional ice hockey goaltender, most famous for his time with the Montreal Canadiens with whom he won the 1993 Stanley Cup as the backup goaltender to Patrick Roy.

== Career ==
Racicot started his National Hockey League (NHL) career in 1989 with the Montreal Canadiens. He had been selected in the 4th round, 83rd overall, of the 1989 NHL entry draft following a successful career in the Quebec Major Junior Hockey League with the Granby Bisons.

Montreal already had established first-team duo Patrick Roy and Brian Hayward who had won three William M. Jennings Trophy in a row from 1986 to 1989. As a result, Racicot's first season was spent largely on the Sherbrooke Canadiens farm team, but he finally made his NHL debut on December 9, 1989, against the Toronto Maple Leafs, when he allowed three goals on six shots in just less than 13 minutes before being replaced. It was his only NHL appearance of the 1989–90 NHL season. He shared the Harry "Hap" Holmes Memorial Award for fewest goals allowed in the AHL in 1990 with fellow understudy Jean-Claude Bergeron.

The 1990–91 season saw regular understudy Hayward traded to the Minnesota North Stars. As a result, Racicot split time with the Fredericton Canadiens and Montreal, as he battled with Jean-Claude Bergeron and Frédéric Chabot for second-string duties.

The following 1991–92 season saw Roland Melanson brought in as an experienced backup, reducing Racicot's opportunities significantly as he again spent a large portion of the season with Fredericton. In his 9 appearances for Montreal, he was winless, while Roy appeared in 67 games to earn another Jennings Trophy.

In 1992–93 Racicot had his most successful season for Montreal. While Roy appeared in the majority of games (62 of the 84 possible) Racicot saw action in 26 games, winning 17. The Canadiens made their way to the 1993 Stanley Cup Final. Racicot saw only 18 minutes of action in the playoffs as Roy backstopped the unfancied Montreal to their first Stanley Cup win since 1986.

The following year Racicot again faced competition for his second string position, with Ron Tugnutt and Les Kuntar splitting playing time. His performances dipped, and ultimately he was released at the end of the 1994 season.

Racicot left the NHL after the 1994 season, spending several seasons with various teams in the AHL, International Hockey League, and East Coast Hockey League. The 1999–2000 season saw Racicot move to Russia, playing in 20 games with HC Neftekhimik Nizhnekamsk before returning to North America for another five seasons of minor-pro hockey. He retired as a player in 2004.

== Nickname ==
Racicot earned the infamous nickname "Red Light" following early performances with Montreal. Claims as to its origin are disputed. Stories allege it was given by journalist Red Fisher following his disappointing debut that saw him concede 3 in 6 shots before being pulled. Others have attributed it to Don Cherry.

== Career statistics ==
=== Regular season and playoffs ===
			Regular season									Playoffs
Season	Team	League	GP	W	L	T	MIN	GA	SO	GAA	SV%	GP	W	L	MIN	GA	SO	GAA	SV%
1986–87	Longueuil Chevaliers	QMJHL	3	1	2	0	19	180	0	6.33	.824	—	—	—	—	—	—	—	—
1987–88	Victoriaville Tigres	QMJHL	8	5	2	1	489	28	0	3.44	.898	—	—	—	—	—	—	—	—
1987–88	Hull Olympiques	QMJHL	14	10	2	0	667	43	0	3.87	.883	—	—	—	—	—	—	—	—
1987–88	Granby Bisons	QMJHL	8	1	5	0	391	34	0	5.22	.871	5	1	4	298	23	0	4.63	.887
1988–89	Granby Bisons	QMJHL	54	23	22	3	2943	198	0	4.04	.886	4	0	4	219	18	0	4.93	.878
1989–90	Montreal Canadiens	NHL	1	0	0	0	13	3	0	13.85	.500	—	—	—	—	—	—	—	—
1989–90	Sherbrooke Canadiens	AHL	33	19	11	2	1948	97	1	2.99	.910	5	0	4	227	18	0	4.76	—
1990–91	Montreal Canadiens	NHL	21	7	9	2	975	52	1	3.20	.891	2	0	1	12	2	0	10.00	.857
1990–91	Fredericton Canadiens	AHL	22	13	8	1	1252	60	1	2.88	.909	—	—	—	—	—	—	—	—
1991–92	Montreal Canadiens	NHL	9	0	3	3	436	23	0	3.17	.895	1	0	0	1	0	0	0.00	1.000
1991–92	Fredericton Canadiens	AHL	28	14	8	5	1666	86	0	3.10	.900	—	—	—	—	—	—	—	—
1992–93	Montreal Canadiens	NHL	26	17	5	1	1433	81	1	3.39	.881	1	0	0	18	2	0	6.67	.778
1993–94	Montreal Canadiens	NHL	11	2	6	2	500	37	0	4.44	.850	—	—	—	—	—	—	—	—
1993–94	Fredericton Canadiens	AHL	6	1	4	0	292	16	0	3.29	.863	—	—	—	—	—	—	—	—
1994–95	Portland Pirates	AHL	19	10	7	0	1080	53	1	2.94	.900	—	—	—	—	—	—	—	—
1994–95	Phoenix Roadrunners	IHL	3	1	0	0	132	8	0	3.62	.884	2	0	0	20	0	0	0.00	—
1995–96	Albany River Rats	AHL	2	2	0	0	120	4	0	2.00	.931	—	—	—	—	—	—	—	—
1995–96	Columbus Chill	ECHL	1	1	0	0	60	2	0	2.00	.949	—	—	—	—	—	—	—	—
1995–96	Indianapolis Ice	IHL	11	3	6	0	547	43	0	4.72	.866	—	—	—	—	—	—	—	—
1995–96	Peoria Rivermen	IHL	4	2	1	1	240	14	0	3.50	.896	11	6	5	654	34	1	3.12	—
1996–97	Indianapolis Ice	IHL	2	1	0	1	120	3	1	1.50	.940	—	—	—	—	—	—	—	—
1996–97	Kansas City Blades	IHL	6	1	4	0	273	21	0	4.62	.865	—	—	—	—	—	—	—	—
1996–97	Las Vegas Thunder	IHL	13	6	5	1	759	40	1	3.16	.884	—	—	—	—	—	—	—	—
1997–98	Monroe Moccasins	WPHL	31	16	12	2	1789	80	1	2.68	.912	—	—	—	—	—	—	—	—
1997–98	Basingstoke Bison	BISL	3	—	—	—	186	11	—	3.55	—	5	0	5	303	21	0	4.16	—
1998–99	Monroe Moccasins	WPHL	48	25	18	5	2806	148	1	3.16	.911	6	2	4	380	21	1	3.32	.910
1999–2000	HC Neftekhimik Nizhnekamsk	RSL	20	—	—	—	1133	49	1	2.59	—	4	—	—	240	16	0	4.00	—
2000–01	Granby Blitz	QSPHL	15	5	7	1	786	57	0	4.35	—	—	—	—	—	—	—	—	—
2000–01	Bakersfield Condors	WCHL	18	5	11	1	984	59	1	3.60	—	2	0	2	123	9	0	4.39	—
2001–02	Greensboro Generals	ECHL	2	0	1	1	90	9	0	6.00	.780	—	—	—	—	—	—	—	—
2002–03	St-Georges Garaga	QSPHL	15	12	2	0	831	44	1	3.18	—	—	—	—	—	—	—	—	—
2003–04	St. Jean Mission	QSPHL	18	9	7	0	880	64	0	4.36	—	—	—	—	—	—	—	—	—
2004–05	Rivière-du-Loup CIMT	QNAHL	4	—	—	—	—	—	—	—	—	—	—	—	—	—	—	—	—
AHL totals			110	59	38	8	6358	316	3	2.98	.903	5	0	4	227	18	0	4.76	—
NHL totals			68	26	23	8	3357	196	2	3.50	.880	4	0	1	31	4	0	7.74	.833
IHL totals			39	14	16	3	2071	129	2	3.74	.880	13	6	5	674	34	1	3.03	—
