= Daniel Marois =

Canadian ice hockey player

- Born: October 3, 1968 (age 57) Montreal, Quebec, Canada
- Height: 6 ft 1 in (185 cm)
- Weight: 190 lb (86 kg; 13 st 8 lb)
- Position: Right wing
- Shot: Right
- Played for: Toronto Maple Leafs; New York Islanders; Boston Bruins
- National team: Canada
- NHL draft: 28th overall, 1987; Toronto Maple Leafs
- Playing career: 1988–2005

Daniel Marois (born October 3, 1968) is a Canadian former professional ice hockey winger who played eight seasons in the National Hockey League from 1987–88 until 1995–96. He played in the NHL for the Toronto Maple Leafs, New York Islanders, Boston Bruins and Dallas Stars. He is the uncle of former NHL player Mathieu Perreault.

Marois was drafted 28th overall in the 1987 NHL entry draft by the Maple Leafs. He played 350 career NHL games, scoring 117 goals and 93 assists for 210 points. In the 1989–90 NHL season, he set career highs with thirty-nine goals, thirty-seven assists and seventy six points in only sixty-eight games.. He is only the third player in modern Maple Leafs history (since 1943–44) to score multiple hat tricks in their first season with the club, following Wilf Paiement and later John Tavares, and is the only one to do so as a rookie.

As a youth, he played in the 1980 Quebec International Pee-Wee Hockey Tournament with a minor ice hockey team from Plessisville, Quebec.

== Career statistics ==
=== Regular season and playoffs ===
			Regular season					Playoffs
Season	Team	League	GP	G	A	Pts	PIM	GP	G	A	Pts	PIM
1984–85	Cantons de l'Est Cantonniers	QMAAA	40	37	29	66	84	15	11	10	21	18
1985–86	Verdun Junior Canadiens	QMJHL	58	42	35	77	110	5	4	2	6	6
1986–87	Verdun Junior Canadiens	QMJHL	32	16	21	37	132	—	—	—	—	—
1986–87	Chicoutimi Sagueneens	QMJHL	8	6	5	11	11	16	7	14	21	25
1987–88	Verdun Junior Canadiens	QMJHL	67	52	36	88	153	—	—	—	—	—
1987–88	Newmarket Saints	AHL	8	4	4	8	4	—	—	—	—	—
1987–88	Toronto Maple Leafs	NHL	—	—	—	—	—	3	1	0	1	0
1988–89	Toronto Maple Leafs	NHL	76	31	23	54	76	—	—	—	—	—
1989–90	Toronto Maple Leafs	NHL	68	39	37	76	82	5	2	2	4	12
1990–91	Toronto Maple Leafs	NHL	78	21	9	30	112	—	—	—	—	—
1991–92	Toronto Maple Leafs	NHL	63	15	11	26	76	—	—	—	—	—
1991–92	New York Islanders	NHL	12	2	5	7	18	—	—	—	—	—
1992–93	New York Islanders	NHL	28	2	5	7	35	—	—	—	—	—
1992–93	Capital District Islanders	AHL	4	2	0	2	0	—	—	—	—	—
1993–94	Boston Bruins	NHL	22	7	3	10	18	11	0	1	1	16
1993–94	Providence Bruins	AHL	6	1	2	3	6	12	9	3	12	2
1995–96	Dallas Stars	NHL	3	0	0	0	2	—	—	—	—	—
1995–96	Michigan K–Wings	IHL	61	28	28	56	105	—	—	—	—	—
1995–96	Minnesota Moose	IHL	13	4	3	7	20	—	—	—	—	—
1996–97	Utah Grizzlies	IHL	29	7	9	16	58	—	—	—	—	—
1996–97	Quebec Rafales	IHL	7	1	1	2	12	—	—	—	—	—
1996–97	SC Bern	NDA	8	7	7	14	10	11	4	8	12	26
1997–98	Adler Mannheim	DEL	20	3	6	9	40	—	—	—	—	—
1997–98	SC Bern	NDA	21	16	4	20	72	7	1	5	6	16
1998–99	SC Bern	NDA	45	27	31	58	93	6	3	2	5	18
1999–2000	Ilves	SM-l	13	4	2	6	16	—	—	—	—	—
1999–2000	Lausanne HC	SUI–2	15	17	9	26	36	3	0	1	1	4
2000–01	HC Ambrì–Piotta	NLA	42	10	21	31	97	—	—	—	—	—
2001–02	Saint John Flames	AHL	23	6	1	7	16	—	—	—	—	—
2001–02	HC Bolzano	ITA	5	4	4	8	2	—	—	—	—	—
2002–03	SC Rapperswil–Jona Lakers	NLA	5	1	1	2	4	2	0	0	0	2
2002–03	SC Langenthal	SUI–2	30	15	29	44	98	—	—	—	—	—
2003–04	SC Langenthal	SUI–2	10	9	6	15	57	—	—	—	—	—
2004–05	Verdun Dragons	LNAH	31	14	23	37	34	—	—	—	—	—
NHL totals			350	117	93	210	419	19	3	3	6	28
NDA/NLA totals			121	61	64	125	276	26	8	15	23	62

=== International ===
Year	Team	Event	GP	G	A	Pts	PIM
2001	Canada	WC	1	0	1	1	0
Senior totals			1	0	1	1	0
