= Plattsburgh Pioneers =

American junior ice hockey team

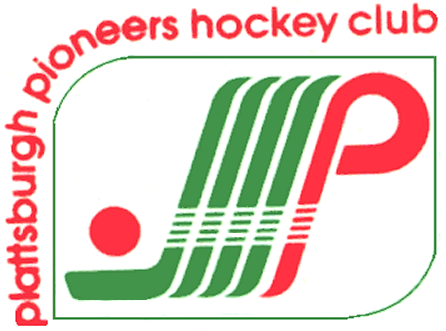
- City: Plattsburgh, New York
- League: Quebec Major Junior Hockey League
- Division: Lebel
- Operated: 1984
- Home arena: Ronald B. Stafford Ice Arena; Crete Civic Center

The Plattsburgh Pioneers were a junior ice hockey team, based in Plattsburgh, New York, who played 17 games in the Quebec Major Junior Hockey League during the 1984–85 QMJHL season.

== History ==
The Pioneers were the first Quebec Major Junior Hockey League (QMJHL) expansion team in the United States. The league did not hold an expansion draft, resulting in an all-American roster.

Plattsburgh's first game was played on September 15, 1984, at the Ronald B. Stafford Ice Arena against the Hull Olympiques, in front of 1,500 fans. Plattsburgh earned a 6-6 tie after regulation, the team's only point in the season. Coach Yves Beaudry resigned after the first game. The team's owner and general manager, Denis Methot, took over for the remainder of the season.

John Torchetti played eight games for Plattsburgh before a professional career. The Pioneers held the rights to Max Middendorf, who played in the Ontario Hockey League and later in the National Hockey League.

The last few home games were moved to the smaller Crete Civic Center. On October 27, Plattsburgh drew 800 fans, their second-largest crowd of the season. Two days later, the Pioneers folded six weeks into the season. An attempt to move the franchise to Massena, New York was declined by the QMJHL, and games played against Plattsburgh were not counted in the league standings or statistics.

In 2003, the Lewiston Maineiacs became the second American-based team in the QMJHL.
