= Jean-Claude Bergeron =

Canadian ice hockey player (born 1968)

- Born: October 14, 1968 (age 57) Hauterive, Quebec, Canada
- Height: 6 ft 2 in (188 cm)
- Weight: 192 lb (87 kg; 13 st 10 lb)
- Position: Goaltender
- Caught: Left
- Played for: Montreal Canadiens; Tampa Bay Lightning; Los Angeles Kings
- NHL draft: 104th overall, 1988; Montreal Canadiens
- Playing career: 1989–2000

Jean-Claude Joseph "J. C." Bergeron (born October 14, 1968) is a Canadian former professional ice hockey goaltender. He played 72 games in the National Hockey League with the Montreal Canadiens, Tampa Bay Lightning, and Los Angeles Kings between 1990 and 1997. He was selected 104th overall in the 1988 NHL entry draft by the Canadiens.

== Career statistics ==
=== Regular season and playoffs ===
			Regular season									Playoffs
Season	Team	League	GP	W	L	T	MIN	GA	SO	GAA	SV%	GP	W	L	MIN	GA	SO	GAA	SV%
1985–86	Shawinigan Cataractes	QMJHL	33	13	16	1	1796	156	0	5.21	.840	3	0	3	140	23	0	9.86	.770
1986–87	Shawinigan Cataractes	QMJHL	11	5	4	1	630	52	0	4.96	.814	—	—	—	—	—	—	—	—
1986–87	Verdun Junior Canadiens	QMJHL	52	16	32	2	2991	306	0	6.14	.835	—	—	—	—	—	—	—	—
1987–88	Verdun Junior Canadiens	QMJHL	49	13	31	3	2715	265	0	5.86	.865	—	—	—	—	—	—	—	—
1988–89	Verdun Junior Canadiens	QMJHL	44	8	34	1	2417	199	0	4.94	.878	—	—	—	—	—	—	—	—
1988–89	Sherbrooke Canadiens	AHL	5	4	1	0	302	18	0	3.58	—	—	—	—	—	—	—	—	—
1989–90	Sherbrooke Canadiens	AHL	40	21	8	7	2254	103	2	2.74	—	9	6	2	497	28	0	3.38	—
1990–91	Montreal Canadiens	NHL	18	7	6	2	942	59	0	3.76	.862	—	—	—	—	—	—	—	—
1990–91	Fredericton Canadiens	AHL	18	12	6	0	1083	59	1	3.27	—	10	5	5	546	32	0	3.52	—
1991–92	Fredericton Canadiens	AHL	13	5	7	1	791	57	0	4.32	—	—	—	—	—	—	—	—	—
1991–92	Peoria Rivermen	IHL	27	14	9	3	1632	96	1	3.53	—	6	3	3	352	24	0	4.09	—
1992–93	Tampa Bay Lightning	NHL	21	8	10	1	1164	71	0	3.66	.876	—	—	—	—	—	—	—	—
1992–93	Atlanta Knights	IHL	31	21	7	1	1722	92	1	3.21	.884	6	3	3	368	19	0	3.10	.899
1993–94	Tampa Bay Lightning	NHL	3	1	1	1	135	7	0	3.13	.899	—	—	—	—	—	—	—	—
1993–94	Atlanta Knights	IHL	48	27	11	7	2755	141	0	3.07	.884	2	1	1	153	6	0	2.34	.900
1994–95	Tampa Bay Lightning	NHL	17	3	9	1	883	49	1	3.33	.869	—	—	—	—	—	—	—	—
1994–95	Atlanta Knights	IHL	6	3	3	0	324	24	0	4.44	.868	—	—	—	—	—	—	—	—
1995–96	Tampa Bay Lightning	NHL	12	2	6	2	596	42	0	4.23	.832	—	—	—	—	—	—	—	—
1995–96	Atlanta Knights	IHL	25	9	10	3	1326	92	0	4.16	.877	—	—	—	—	—	—	—	—
1996–97	Los Angeles Kings	NHL	1	0	1	0	56	4	0	4.30	.886	—	—	—	—	—	—	—	—
1996–97	Phoenix Roadrunners	IHL	42	11	19	7	2296	127	0	3.32	.900	—	—	—	—	—	—	—	—
1998–99	Blizzard de Joliette	QSPHL	15	12	1	1	850	45	0	3.18	—	11	9	2	199	27	1	2.38	—
1999–00	Blizzard de Joliette	QSPHL	13	8	5	0	732	50	0	4.10	—	—	—	—	—	—	—	—	—
NHL totals			72	21	33	7	3773	232	1	3.69	.866	—	—	—	—	—	—	—	—

Awards and achievements
Preceded by Randy Exelby	Aldege "Baz" Bastien Memorial Award; 1989–90	Succeeded by Mark Laforest
