= Jean-Marc Richard =

Jean-Marc Richard may refer to:

- Jean-Marc Richard (ice hockey) (born 1966), retired Canadian ice hockey player
- Jean-Marc Richard (TV and radio presenter) (born 1960), Swiss radio and television personality
