= Four States Arena =

Multi-purpose arena in Texarkana, Arkansas

Coordinates: 33.469692°N 94.002489°W

- Interactive map of Four States Arena
- Address: 3700 East 50th Street
- Location: Texarkana, Arkansas, U.S.
- Owner: Four States Fair
- Capacity: 5,600

Construction
- Opened: 1985

Tenants
- Border City Bandits (CHL) (2000–2001)

The Four States Arena (or Four States Fair Arena) is a 5,600-seat multi-purpose arena in Texarkana, Arkansas. Built in 1985, the venue is located at the Four States Fairgrounds which is within the limits of Bobby Ferguson Park.

The arena was home to the Central Hockey League's Border City Bandits (2000–2001). Through the years, The Four States Arena has hosted many entertainers performing concerts along with a number of annual and seasonal events each year including the rodeo at the Four States Fair each September and the holiday-themed "Mistletoe Fair" in either November or December.
