= Terho Koskela =

Finnish ice hockey player

- Born: 23 December 1964 (age 61) Salla, FIN
- Height: 6 ft 0 in (183 cm)
- Weight: 195 lb (88 kg; 13 st 13 lb)
- Position: Defence
- Shot: Right
- Played for: Frölunda HC
- Playing career: 1987–2000

Terho Koskela (born 23 December 1964 in Salla, Finland) is a retired Finnish ice hockey player. Koskela spent much of his career with Frölunda HC in Gothenburg, Sweden and served as club captain from 1992 to 1995.

He moved to Olofström in Blekinge County, Sweden when he was only one and a half years old. Then the Volvo factory was looking for labor and both his parents started working there.

== Career statistics ==
			Regular season					Playoffs
Season	Team	League	GP	G	A	Pts	PIM	GP	G	A	Pts	PIM
1979–80	Olofströms IK U16	—	—	—	—	—	—	—	—	—	—	—
1980–81	Olofströms IK	Division 2	4	0	0	0	—	—	—	—	—	—
1981–82	Olofströms IK	Division 2	31	2	3	5	—	—	—	—	—	—
1982–83	Olofströms IK	Division 2	32	—	—	—	—	—	—	—	—	—
1983–84	Olofströms IK	Division 2	—	—	—	—	—	—	—	—	—	—
1984–85	Olofströms IK	Division 2	—	—	—	—	—	—	—	—	—	—
1985–86	Malmö IF	Division 1	31	10	14	24	22	4	0	3	3	2
1986–87	Malmö IF	Division 1	32	8	8	16	30	—	—	—	—	—
1987–88	Västra Frölunda HC	Division 1	19	1	1	2	6	11	0	1	1	0
1988–89	Västra Frölunda HC	Division 1	25	11	8	19	18	11	4	3	7	10
1989–90	Västra Frölunda HC	Elitserien	39	14	9	23	16	—	—	—	—	—
1990–91	Västra Frölunda HC	Elitserien	22	5	1	6	8	—	—	—	—	—
1990–91	Västra Frölunda HC	Allsvenskan D1	18	3	8	11	11	10	1	1	2	6
1991–92	Västra Frölunda HC	Elitserien	40	22	13	35	16	3	3	3	6	4
1992–93	Västra Frölunda HC	Elitserien	22	4	4	8	16	—	—	—	—	—
1992–93	Västra Frölunda HC	Allsvenskan D1	18	7	8	15	6	3	0	1	1	0
1993–94	Västra Frölunda HC	Elitserien	40	5	13	18	22	4	0	2	2	2
1994–95	Västra Frölunda HC	Elitserien	17	6	5	11	24	—	—	—	—	—
1994–95	Västra Frölunda HC	Allsvenskan D1	17	4	3	7	2	5	0	1	1	4
1995–96	CE Wien	Austria	33	14	18	32	43	—	—	—	—	—
1996–97	Newcastle Cobras	BISL	42	13	13	26	20	6	1	2	3	16
1997–98	Hamburg Crocodiles	Germany2	7	1	2	3	0	—	—	—	—	—
1997–98	HK Kings	Division 2	—	—	—	—	—	—	—	—	—	—
1998–99	Abilene Aviators	WPHL	68	15	25	40	32	3	0	1	1	0
1999–00	Abilene Aviators	WPHL	26	2	16	18	12	—	—	—	—	—
1999–00	Rockford IceHogs	UHL	11	1	5	6	10	—	—	—	—	—
2001–02	Lysekils HK	Division 2	—	—	—	—	—	—	—	—	—	—
Elitserien totals			180	56	45	101	102	7	3	5	8	6
Division 1 totals			107	30	31	61	76	26	4	7	11	12

Preceded by Mikael Andersson	Frölunda HC captains 1992–1995	Succeeded by Christian Ruuttu
