= Shawinigan Cataractes =

Junior ice hockey team in Shawinigan, Quebec

Shawinigan Cataractes Cataractes de Shawinigan
- City: Shawinigan, Quebec
- League: Quebec Maritimes Junior Hockey League
- Conference: Western
- Division: Central
- Founded: 1969; 57 years ago
- Home arena: Centre Gervais Auto
- Colours: Navy blue, gold, green, white and burgundy
- General manager: Martin Mondou
- Head coach: Daniel Renaud
- Website: www.cataractes.qc.ca

Franchise history
- 1969–1973: Shawinigan Bruins
- 1973–1978: Shawinigan Dynamos
- 1978–present: Shawinigan Cataractes

Championships
- Playoff championships: Memorial Cup; 2012; QMJHL champions 2022

Current uniform

The Shawinigan Cataractes (French: Cataractes de Shawinigan) are a Canadian junior ice hockey team in the Quebec Maritimes Junior Hockey League (QMJHL) based in Shawinigan, Quebec. The franchise plays their home games at the Centre Gervais Auto, and were originally known as the Shawinigan Bruins until 1973, as well as the Shawinigan Dynamos from 1973 to 1978.

== Etymology ==
"Cataractes" is the plural form of "cataracte", which means in English 'cataract' in the sense of a powerful waterfall, derived from the Latin word "cataracta" meaning 'waterfall' or 'portcullis'. The team is named after the Shawinigan Falls, a prominent waterfall in the city of Shawinigan.

== NHL alumni ==
- Yves Beaudoin
- Anthony Beauvillier
- Simon Benoit
- Jean-Claude Bergeron
- Marc-André Bergeron
- Yves Bergeron
- Alexandre Bolduc
- Mavrik Bourque
- Michaël Bournival
- Mathieu Biron
- Michel Brière
- Alexandre Burrows
- Stéphane Charbonneau
- Mathieu Chouinard
- Enrico Ciccone
- Matthieu Descoteaux
- Sam Girard
- Benoit Gosselin
- Mario Gosselin
- Matvei Gridin
- François Groleau
- Stéphane Guérard
- Jean-François Jomphe
- Patrick Lalime
- Patrick Lebeau
- Stéphan Lebeau
- Patrice Lefebvre
- Zbynek Michalek
- Olivier Michaud
- Sergio Momesso
- Stéphane Morin
- Mathieu Olivier
- Paul Pageau
- Steve Penney
- Timo Pielmeier
- Jason Pominville
- Vasili Ponomaryov
- Daniel Poudrier
- Claude Pronovost
- Jean-François Quintin
- Pierre Rioux
- Stéphane Robidas
- Dominic Roussel
- Daniel Shank
- Patrick Traverse
- Radim Vrbata

== Season results ==
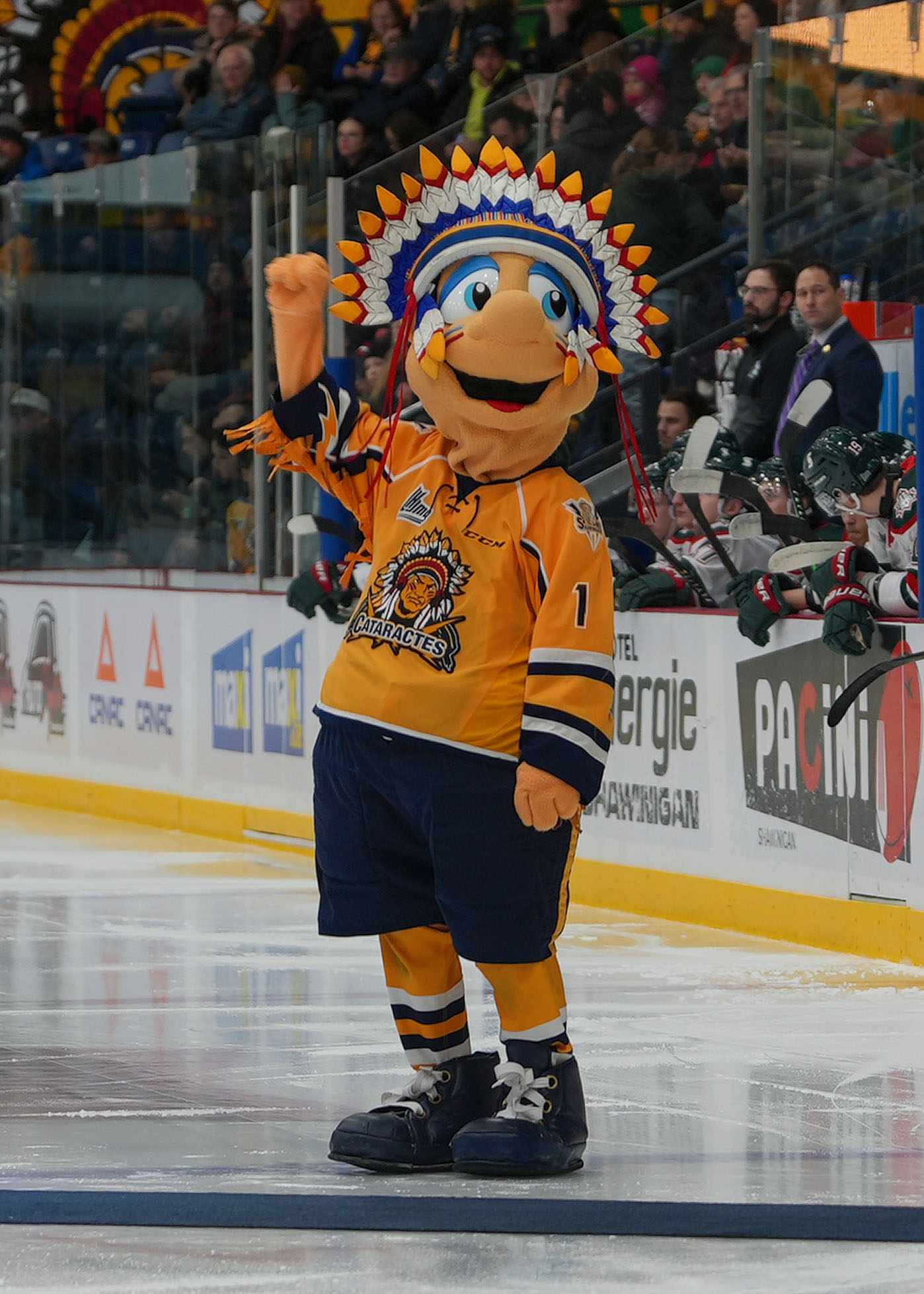
Thomas Hawk, the Cataractes mascot

- 1969–73 Shawinigan Bruins
- 1973–78 Shawinigan Dynamos
- 1978–present Shawinigan Cataractes

Legend: OTL = Overtime loss, SL = Shootout loss

Season	Games	Won	Lost	Tied	OTL	SL	Points	Pct %	Goals for	Goals against	Standing
1969–70	56	36	19	1	-	-	73	0.652	318	254	2nd in East
1970–71	62	38	23	1	-	-	77	0.621	301	256	2nd in QMJHL
1971–72	61	34	24	3	-	-	71	0.582	290	208	5th in QMJHL
1972–73	64	28	34	2	-	-	70	0.453	301	278	4th in QMJHL
1973–74	70	30	37	3	-	-	63	0.450	347	402	3rd in East
1974–75	72	16	45	11	-	-	43	0.299	324	462	5th in East
1975–76	72	9	59	4	-	-	22	0.153	254	554	5th in East
1976–77	72	18	42	12	-	-	48	0.333	265	357	4th in Dilio
1977–78	72	3	65	4	-	-	10	0.069	258	687	5th in Dilio
1978–79	74	24	43	7	-	-	53	0.372	310	424	5th in Dilio
1979–80	72	28	35	9	-	-	65	0.451	314	339	5th in Dilio
1980–81	72	34	34	4	-	-	72	0.500	325	321	4th in Dilio
1981–82	64	35	27	2	-	-	72	0.562	349	278	5th in QMJHL
1982–83	70	52	16	2	-	-	106	0.757	406	232	1st in Dilio
1983–84	70	37	33	0	-	-	74	0.529	329	287	1st in Dilio
1984–85	68	48	19	1	-	-	98	0.713	384	255	1st in Dilio
1985–86	72	32	38	2	-	-	66	0.458	353	361	4th in Dilio
1986–87	70	38	26	6	-	-	82	0.586	408	335	2nd in Dilio
1987–88	70	30	37	3	-	-	63	0.450	387	381	4th in Dilio
1988–89	70	31	35	4	-	-	66	0.471	318	321	8th in QMJHL
1989–90	70	38	30	2	-	-	78	0.557	328	275	4th in QMJHL
1990–91	70	27	40	3	-	-	57	0.407	261	289	4th in Dilio
1991–92	70	37	27	6	-	-	80	0.571	279	273	2nd in Dilio
1992–93	70	19	46	5	-	-	43	0.307	262	357	5th in Dilio
1993–94	72	36	31	5	-	-	77	0.535	316	313	4th in Dilio
1994–95	72	40	28	4	-	-	84	0.583	325	270	2nd in Dilio
1995–96	70	35	30	5	-	-	75	0.536	289	259	3rd in Dilio
1996–97	70	41	24	5	-	-	87	0.621	277	232	2nd in Dilio
1997–98	70	40	24	6	-	-	86	0.614	262	217	3rd in Lebel
1998–99	70	44	22	4	-	-	92	0.657	275	212	1st in Lebel
1999–2000	72	37	25	5	5	-	84	0.549	295	257	1st in Central
2000–01	72	54	10	6	2	-	116	0.792	375	192	1st in Central
2001–02	72	43	21	5	3	-	94	0.632	288	200	1st in Central
2002–03	72	25	35	8	4	-	62	0.403	209	249	3rd in Central
2003–04	70	39	21	4	6	-	88	0.586	259	215	2nd in West
2004–05	70	31	25	12	2	-	76	0.529	199	188	2nd in West
2005–06	70	37	28	-	3	2	79	0.544	285	278	6th in West
2006–07	70	25	39	-	2	4	56	0.357	228	301	9th in Telus^{†}
2007–08	70	33	33	-	-	4	70	0.471	226	241	6th in Telus
2008–09	68	51	14	-	3	0	105	0.750	308	183	2nd in Central^{††}
2009–10	68	31	29	-	3	5	70	0.477	148	162	3rd in Central
2010–11	68	42	23	-	2	1	87	0.640	250	202	4th in Telus West
2011–12	68	45	16	-	3	4	97	0.713	274	179	1st in East
2012–13	68	15	46	-	5	2	37	0.220	154	284	17th in QMJHL
2013–14	68	20	39	-	4	5	49	0.360	163	251	16th in QMJHL
2014–15	68	39	26	-	1	2	81	0.596	259	214	3rd in East
2015–16	68	44	19	-	4	1	93	0.684	281	220	1st in East
2016–17	68	42	20	-	4	2	90	0.662	258	184	1st in East
2017–18	68	16	45	-	6	1	39	0.287	183	298	17th in QMJHL
2018–19	68	14	49	-	2	3	33	0.243	188	347	8th in West
2019–20	63	29	32	-	2	0	60	0.476	227	245	6th in West
2020–21	34	21	10	-	2	1	45	0.662	125	109	2nd in East
2021–22	68	40	24	-	1	3	84	0.618	235	190	3rd in West
2022–23	68	29	34	-	2	3	63	0.463	209	236	5th in West
2023–24	68	30	34	-	3	1	64	0.471	195	215	6th in West
2024–25	64	38	18	-	3	5	84	0.656	253	190	3rd in West
2025–26	64	35	23	-	2	4	76	0.594	253	214	3rd in Western

^{†}Seeded 8th in Eastern Division for 2006–07 playoffs.

^{††}Seeded 5th in Telus Division for 2008–09 playoffs.
