= Crete Civic Center =

Indoor arena in Plattsburgh, New York

Coordinates: 44.7219°N 73.4348°W

Crete Civic Center was a multi-purpose indoor arena in Plattsburgh, New York. It was briefly home to the Plattsburgh Pioneers of the Quebec Major Junior Hockey League. More recently, the Crete has hosted several professional wrestling events that have been put on by Total Nonstop Action Wrestling. In August 2015, then Presidential Candidate Donald Trump held a rally at the center. The City of Plattsburgh most recently utilized the arena for indoor soccer. An electrical fire in May 2022 damaged the already dilapidated building. Repairs were estimated to reach near $3 million. Plattsburgh city officials voted to demolish the building instead, at an estimated cost of $400,000. Demolition of the building began in May 2023.
