= Abilene Aviators =

- City: Abilene, Texas
- League: Western Professional Hockey League
- Founded: 1998
- Home arena: Taylor County Expo Center
- Colours: Red, yellow, green, brown

Franchise history
- 1998–2000: Abilene Aviators

The Abilene Aviators were a former American ice hockey team in Abilene, Texas. They played in the Western Professional Hockey League from 1998 to 2000.

== Season-by-season record ==
Season	GP	W	L	OTL	Pts	GF	GA	Place	Playoffs
1998–99	69	43	23	3	89	261	230	1st, West	Lost in second round
1999–00	26	6	16	4	16	70	115	6th, Central	Folded during the season

== Records ==
- Games Terho Koskela 94
- Goals Jean-Francois Gregoire 49
- Assists Jean-Francois Gregoire 57
- Points Jean-Francois Gregoire 106
- PIM Eric Naud 270

== Notable NHL players ==
- Stephane Roy
- Marty Dallman
- Alan May
