= Richard Boivin =

Canadian judge

Richard Boivin is a Canadian former judge who served on the Federal Court and the Federal Court of Appeal. As a lawyer, he has worked in international arbitration, constitutional law, and Aboriginal law.

Boivin obtained a Bachelor of Civil Laws from the University of Ottawa in 1988, a Master of Laws from the University of London, King's College in 1991 and Master of Laws from the University of Ottawa in 1995. He is qualified to practice law in Quebec, Paris, and as a solicitor for England and Wales.

Prior to his appointment, he worked as a clerk for Justice Robert Décary of the Federal Court of Appeal in 1990, for the Quebec Department of Justice from 1991 to 1993, and as counsel for the Canadian Department of Justice from 1993 to 1997. From 1997 to 2001, he worked with the Quebec Department of International Relations in London and Paris. He later worked as a senior lawyer for Ernst & Young Paris from 2001 to 2004, then as Associate Senior General Counsel with the Aboriginal Affairs Portfolio for the Department of Justice from 2004 to 2009.

Boivin was appointed to the Federal Court on June 19, 2009. He was then appointed to the Federal Court of Appeal on April 11, 2014. He remained at the Federal Court of Appeal until September 1, 2023.
