= Border City Bandits =

Disbanded professional ice hockey team from Texarkana, Texas

The Border City Bandits were a professional ice hockey team from Texarkana, Texas. They were a member of the Central Hockey League during the 2000-01 season and played at the Four States Arena.

== History ==
The Central Hockey League announced that Canadian developer John Barath had been awarded an expansion franchise in Texarkana for the 2000-01 season. The expansion team’s arrival was met with skepticism when the Texarkana Gazette reported that Barath had previously abandoned the Tucson Gila Monsters, a team he earlier had owned in the West Coast Hockey League.

Operating from the CHL’s smallest market, the team was already in trouble by November of its inaugural season, both on and off the ice. One problem was that the Four States Arena was a converted warehouse that would leak onto the ice with a small amount of rain. Crowds had dropped from nearly 4,000 to under 2,200; the team had already seen two head coaches and was on its third general manager; and soon the Bandits were no longer paying their bills. On February 20, 2001, with $80,000 in dues payments owed to the league, the CHL terminated the franchise. The team's record in its only season was 11 wins, 37 losses and 4 Shootout Losses.

The one positive note is during a game versus the San Antonio Iguanas, the Bandits goaltender Jean-Ian Filiatrault stopped an amazing 60 of 61 shots in one game, which still stands as a single-game record in the CHL.
