= Gatineau Olympiques =

Junior ice hockey team in Gatineau, Quebec

Gatineau Olympiques Olympiques de Gatineau
- City: Gatineau, Quebec
- League: Quebec Maritimes Junior Hockey League
- Conference: Western
- Division: West
- Founded: 1969
- Home arena: Centre Slush Puppie
- Colours: Black, white and silver
- General manager: Serge Beausoleil
- Head coach: Alexis Loiseau
- Website: olympiquesdegatineau.ca

Franchise history
- 1969–1970: Hull Hawks
- 1970–1976: Hull Festivals
- 1976–2003: Hull Olympiques
- 2003–present: Gatineau Olympiques

Championships
- Playoff championships: Memorial Cup Champions; 1997; QMJHL Champions; 1986, 1988, 1995, 2003, 2004, 2008

Current uniform

The Gatineau Olympiques are a Canadian junior ice hockey team based in Gatineau, Quebec, that plays in the Quebec Maritimes Junior Hockey League (QMJHL). Starting with the 2021–22 season, the Olympiques play home games at Centre Slush Puppie, having previously played at the Robert Guertin Centre dating back to its beginnings in the Central Junior A Hockey League. The club, then known as the Hull Festivals, was granted membership in the QMJHL in 1973. The Olympiques have appeared in the Memorial Cup seven times, winning the 1997 Memorial Cup.

== History ==
Before joining the QMJHL, the team was a member of the Central Junior A Hockey League, known originally as the Hull Blackhawks (Les Éperviers de Hull) but later as the Hull Beavers (Les Castors de Hull) and Hull-Volant Junior A. Originally Hull and the CJHL were eligible to compete for the Memorial Cup, the Major Junior crown, but were relegated to Tier II Junior "A" in 1970. The season before joining the QMJHL in 1973 they became the Hull Festivals, and in 1976, they became the Hull Olympiques; the team name was changed to the Gatineau Olympiques one year after the city of Hull was amalgamated into Gatineau in 2002.

The Olympiques share a junior hockey market with the Ottawa 67's, across the Ottawa River. Pre-season games between the two teams were a regular occurrence from 1975 to 1986. The teams have played interleague regular-season home and home games in the 1999–2000, 2000–01, 2001–02, 2002–03 and 2009–10 seasons since.

The Olympiques have won the President's Cup seven times, most recently in 2007–08. The team has been to four Memorial Cup finals, losing three (1986, 2003 and 2004) and winning the 1997 Memorial Cup, which they also hosted.

From 1985 until 1992, the Olympiques were owned by Wayne Gretzky; it was under his ownership that the team first adopted black, silver and white as their team colours, similar to those of the Los Angeles Kings, whom Gretzky played for in 1988.

On May 31, 2010, it was announced that former Olympiques coach Benoit Groulx, who had left the organization to coach the Rochester Americans would be returning to be the general manager and head coach.

For the 2011–12 season, the Olympiques returned to the colours of black, silver and white following an eight-year absence.

In 2016, coach Groulx left the Olympiques again to become the head coach of the Syracuse Crunch. He was replaced by Mario Duhamel who would only coach 47 games with a 19–24–4 record. Duhamel was replaced by assistant coach Éric Landry.

=== Championships ===
Memorial Cup
Canadian Hockey League champions

- 1986 – Finalist vs. Guelph Platers
- 1988 – 3rd place in tournament
- 1995 – 4th place in tournament
- 1997 – Champions vs. Lethbridge Hurricanes
- 2003 – Finalist vs. Kitchener Rangers
- 2004 – Finalist vs. Kelowna Rockets
- 2008 – 4th place in tournament

President's Cup – League playoff champions

- 1985–86 – Champions vs. Drummondville Voltigeurs
- 1987–88 – Champions vs. Drummondville Voltigeurs
- 1994–95 – Champions vs. Laval Titan Collège Français
- 1996–97 – Champions vs. Chicoutimi Saguenéens
- 1998–99 – Finalist vs. Acadie-Bathurst Titan
- 1999–00 – Finalist vs. Rimouski Océanic
- 2002–03 – Champions vs. Halifax Mooseheads
- 2003–04 – Champions vs. Moncton Wildcats
- 2007–08 – Champions vs. Rouyn-Noranda Huskies
- 2010–11 – Finalist vs. Saint John Sea Dogs

Jean Rougeau Trophy – Regular season champions

- 1985–86, 1987–88, 1996–97, 2003–04

Division titles – Regular season champions

- 1985–86, 1987–88, 1996–97, 1999–2000, 2001–02, 2003–04, 2008–09, 2021–22, 2022–23

== Coaches ==
Notable coaches for the Olympiques include, Jean Bégin, Pat Burns, John Chabot, Benoit Groulx, Claude Julien, Bob Mongrain, Marcel Pronovost, Guy Trottier, and Alain Vigneault.

== Season-by-season record ==
- Hull Hawks (1969–1970)
- Hull Festivals (1970–1976)
- Hull Olympiques (1976–2003)
- Gatineau Olympiques (2003–present)

=== Regular season ===
Complete results before 1969 unavailable.

OL = Overtime loss, SL = Shootout loss, Pct = Winning percentage

Season	Games	Won	Lost	Tied	OL	SL	Points	Pct	Goals for	Goals against	Standing
1969–70	40	8	24	8	-	-	24	0.300	149	199	5th, CJAHL
1970–71	48	21	20	7	-	-	49	0.510	255	238	3rd, CJAHL
1971–72	48	16	31	1	-	-	33	0.344	178	269	5th, CJAHL
1972–73	55	7	45	3	-	-	17	0.155	192	338	6th, CJAHL
1973–74	70	14	55	1	-	-	29	0.207	226	405	6th, West
1974–75	72	34	32	6	-	-	74	0.514	386	369	4th, West
1975–76	72	30	35	7	-	-	67	0.465	312	318	4th, West
1976–77	72	26	37	9	-	-	61	0.424	283	333	5th, Lebel
1977–78	72	34	34	4	-	-	72	0.500	357	397	5th, Lebel
1978–79	72	10	55	7	-	-	27	0.188	262	491	5th, Lebel
1979–80	72	25	35	12	-	-	62	0.431	336	378	3rd, Lebel
1980–81	72	23	46	3	-	-	49	0.340	262	353	4th, Lebel
1981–82	64	41	21	2	-	-	84	0.656	343	260	2nd, QMJHL
1982–83	70	30	40	0	-	-	60	0.429	393	406	5th, Lebel
1983–84	70	25	45	0	-	-	50	0.357	301	411	6th, Lebel
1984–85	68	33	34	1	-	-	71	0.493	347	352	2nd, Lebel
1985–86	72	54	18	0	-	-	108	0.750	423	262	1st, Lebel
1986–87	70	26	39	5	-	-	57	0.407	286	323	4th, Lebel
1987–88	70	43	23	4	-	-	90	0.643	380	394	1st, Lebel
1988–89	70	40	25	5	-	-	85	0.607	329	264	3rd, QMJHL
1989–90	70	36	29	5	-	-	77	0.550	306	282	6th, QMJHL
1990–91	70	36	27	7	-	-	79	0.564	263	235	2nd, Lebel
1991–92	70	41	24	5	-	-	87	0.621	331	259	2nd, Lebel
1992–93	70	40	28	2	-	-	82	0.586	296	268	2nd, Lebel
1993–94	72	38	31	3	-	-	79	0.549	310	304	3rd, Lebel
1994–95	72	42	28	2	-	-	86	0.597	340	274	2nd, Lebel
1995–96	70	52	16	2	-	-	106	0.757	347	246	2nd, Lebel
1996–97	70	48	19	3	-	-	99	0.707	346	205	1st, Lebel
1997–98	70	32	37	1	-	-	65	0.464	270	268	6th, Lebel
1998–99	70	23	38	9	-	-	55	0.393	276	298	6th, Lebel
1999–2000	72	42	24	6	0	-	90	0.625	339	256	1st, West
2000–01	72	34	28	7	3	-	78	0.542	288	284	3rd, West
2001–02	72	33	30	3	6	-	75	0.521	230	253	1st, West
2002–03	72	39	27	4	2	-	84	0.583	266	222	2nd, West
2003–04	70	50	13	7	0	-	107	0.764	306	179	1st, Western
2004–05	70	33	28	5	4	-	75	0.536	216	237	3rd, Western
2005–06	70	40	23	-	4	3	87	0.621	261	215	4th, Western
2006–07	70	39	27	-	2	2	82	0.586	303	274	3rd, Telus
2007–08	70	43	19	-	6	2	94	0.664	272	209	3rd, Telus
2008–09	68	38	25	-	2	3	81	0.559	232	232	1st, Western
2009–10	68	30	33	-	1	4	65	0.441	213	217	3rd, Telus West
2010–11	68	43	17	-	3	5	94	0.691	243	193	3rd, Telus West
2011–12	68	26	32	-	5	5	62	0.456	223	274	4th, Telus West
2012–13	68	29	34	-	1	4	63	0.463	220	265	5th, Telus West
2013–14	68	41	23	-	1	3	86	0.632	254	218	4th, Telus West
2014–15	68	31	31	-	0	6	68	0.500	234	242	5th, West
2015–16	68	46	19	-	2	1	95	0.699	250	173	3rd, West
2016–17	68	33	31	-	4	0	70	0.515	234	253	3rd, West
2017–18	68	32	27	-	5	4	73	0.537	213	215	5th, West
2018–19	68	23	39	-	4	2	52	0.382	194	248	4th, West
2019–20	64	22	37	-	5	0	49	0.383	204	247	4th, West
2020–21	31	16	11	-	2	2	36	0.581	95	87	4th, West
2021–22	68	39	15	-	11	3	92	0.676	248	193	2nd, West
2022–23	68	49	12	-	5	2	105	0.772	304	197	2nd, West
2023–24	68	25	31	-	6	6	62	0.456	213	268	7th, West
2024–25	64	17	32	-	8	7	49	0.383	181	240	7th, West
2025–26	64	21	38	-	4	1	47	0.367	143	213	8th, West

== NHL alumni ==
Lists of National Hockey League alumni. No player from the "Hull Hawks" went on the play in the NHL.

Hull Castors (1968–1969)

- Billy Smith

Hull Festivals (1970–1976)

- Ted Bulley
- Nelson Burton
- Richard David
- André Doré
- Pierre Giroux
- Glen Sharpley
- Brent Tremblay

Hull Olympiques (1976–2003)

- Jeff Allan
- Joel Baillargeon
- Yves Beaudoin
- Francis Bélanger
- Martin Biron
- Michel Bolduc
- Sébastien Bordeleau
- Martin Brochu
- Paul Brousseau
- Benoît Brunet
- Jim Campbell
- John Chabot
- Stéphane Charbonneau
- Sylvain Côté
- Jonathan Delisle
- Matthieu Descoteaux
- André Doré
- Christian Dubé
- Gordie Dwyer
- Karl Dykhuis
- Jiri Fischer
- Steven Fletcher
- Michel Galarneau
- Jean-Marc Gaulin
- Jocelyn Gauvreau
- Martin Gélinas
- Martin Gendron
- Rick Hayward
- Aleš Hemský
- Jean-François Labbé
- Marc LaBelle
- Mario Larocque
- Eric Lavigne
- John LeBlanc
- Shane MacEachern
- Don MacLean
- Paul MacLean
- Craig Martin
- Stéphane Matteau
- Andrew McKim
- Jan Nemecek
- Lee Norwood
- Stéphane Quintal
- André Racicot
- Peter Ratchuk
- Alain Raymond
- Stéphane Richer
- Serge Roberge
- Luc Robitaille
- Jeremy Roenick
- Roberto Romano
- Pavel Rosa
- Jean-Marc Routhier
- Cam Russell
- Michael Ryder
- Philippe Sauvé
- Daniel Shank
- Martin Simard
- Maxime Talbot
- José Théodore
- Pascal Trepanier
- Jean-Guy Trudel
- Sylvain Turgeon
- Alain Vigneault
- Radim Vrbata
- Colin White
- Peter Worrell

Gatineau Olympiques (since 2003)

- Vitaly Abramov
- Paul Byron
- Alexandre Carrier
- Philippe Dupuis
- Claude Giroux
- Mike Hoffman
- Tomas Hyka
- David Krejci
- Tristan Luneau
- Zack MacEwen
- Tye McGinn
- Nicolas Meloche
- Doug O'Brien
- Jean-Gabriel Pageau
- Emile Poirier
- Joel Rechlicz
- Maxime Talbot
- Yakov Trenin
- Francis Wathier
- Valentin Zykov

=== Retired numbers ===
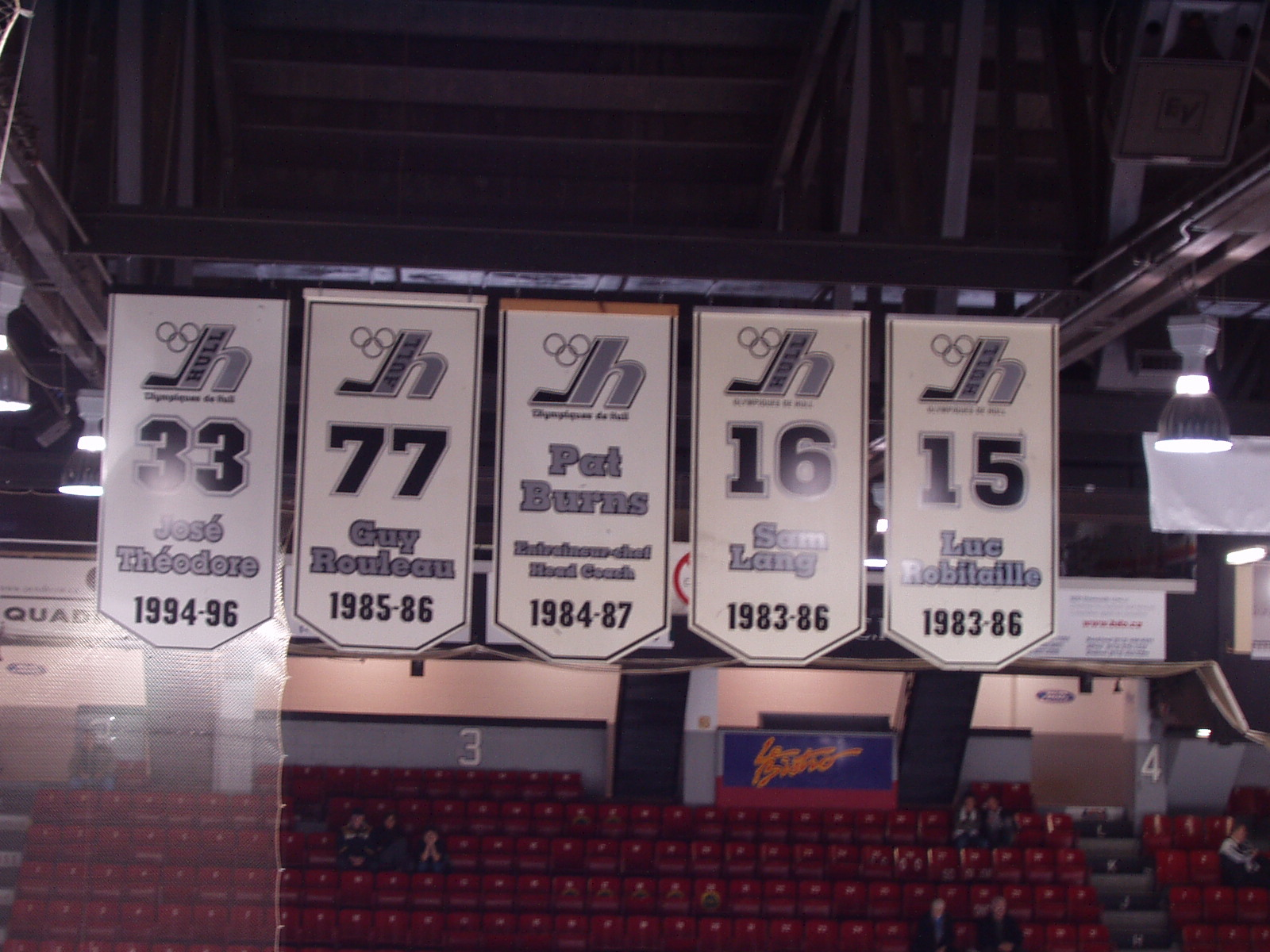
Banners of honoured alumni at the Robert Guertin Centre

Ten Olympiques players have had their numbers retired by the team. Former coach Pat Burns has also been honoured.

- # 10 Jean Poulin
- # 15 Luc Robitaille
- # 16 Sam Lang
- # 20 Martin Gelinas
- # 24 Colin White
- # 25 Maxime Talbot
- # 28 Claude Giroux
- # 32 Marc Saumier
- # 33 José Théodore
- # 55 Pavel Rosa
- # 77 Guy Rouleau
