= 1998–99 QSPHL season =

Canadian ice hockey league season

The 1998–99 QSPHL season was the third season of the Quebec Semi-Pro Hockey League, a minor professional league in the Canadian province of Quebec. 13 teams participated in the regular season, and the Blizzard de Joliette won the league title.

== Regular season ==
Division Est	GP	W	L	OTL	GF	GA	Pts
Garaga de Saint-Georges	36	23	12	1	170	133	47
Coyotes de Thetford Mines	36	21	13	2	151	149	44
Grand Portneuf de Pont-Rouge	36	20	15	1	178	141	41
Condors de Jonquière	36	14	19	3	171	207	31

Division Centrale	GP	W	L	OTL	GF	GA	Pts
Nova d'Acton Vale	36	23	8	5	167	119	51
Blitz de Granby	36	16	14	6	178	180	38
Aztèques d'Asbestos	36	15	17	4	177	176	34
Papetiers de Windsor	36	4	29	3	115	216	11

Division Ouest	GP	W	L	OTL	GF	GA	Pts
Blizzard de Joliette	36	29	6	1	216	137	59
Dragons de Saint-Laurent	36	20	15	1	168	172	41
Chiefs de Laval	36	16	14	6	163	171	38
Dinosaures de Sorel	36	16	17	3	163	202	35
Rapides de Lachute	36	17	19	0	180	194	34

== Coupe Futura-Playoffs ==
Coupe Futura-1/8 Finals
E1	Garaga de Saint-Georges	4
E4	Condors de Jonquière	0
E2	Coyotes de Thetford Mines	4
E3	Grand Portneuf de Pont-Rouge	1
C1	Nova d'Acton Vale	4
C4	Papetiers de Windsor	0
C2	Blitz de Granby	4
C3	Aztèques d'Asbestos	3
O1	Blizzard de Joliette	4
O4	Dinosaures de Sorel	1
O2	Dragons de Saint-Laurent	3
O3	Chiefs de Laval	4

Coupe Futura-Quarterfinals
E1	Garaga de Saint-Georges	4
E2	Coyotes de Thetford Mines	1
C1	Nova d'Acton Vale	4
C2	Blitz de Granby	3
O1	Blizzard de Joliette	4
O3	Chiefs de Laval	0

Coupe Futura-Semifinals
E1	Garaga de Saint-Georges	4
C1	Nova d'Acton Vale	0
O1	Blizzard de Joliette
Bye

Coupe Futura-Final
E1	Garaga de Saint-Georges	2
O1	Blizzard de Joliette	4
