= Jonquière Condors =

Jonquiere Condors
- City: Jonquière, Quebec
- League: Quebec Semi-Pro Hockey League
- Founded: 1997

Franchise history
- 1997 to 2002: Jonquière Condors
- 2002 to 2004: Saguenay Paramedic
- 2004 to 2005: Saguenay Fjord

The Jonquière Condors were a Canadian minor pro ice hockey team in Jonquière, Quebec. They played in the Quebec Semi-Pro Hockey League from 1997–2002.

For the 2002–03 season, the franchise was moved to Saguenay, and became the Saguenay Paramedic.

== Records ==
- Games Eric Gravel, Richard Boivin 173
- Goals Jean Imbeau 196
- Assists Jean Imbeau 156
- Points Jean Imbeau 252
- PIM Dave LaSalle 801

== Notable players ==
- Olivier Croteau
