= 1999–2000 QSPHL season =

Season of semi-professional hockey league in Quebec

The 1999–00 QSPHL season was the fourth season of the Quebec Semi-Pro Hockey League, a minor professional league in the Canadian province of Quebec. 14 teams participated in the regular season, and the Rapides de LaSalle won the league title.

== Regular season ==
Division Bauer	GP	W	L	OTL	GF	GA	Pts
Garaga de Saint-Georges	38	27	9	2	191	112	56
Grand Portneuf de Pont-Rouge	38	25	8	5	170	116	55
Aztèques d'Asbestos	38	24	10	4	188	161	52
Condors de Jonquière	38	19	16	3	193	175	41
Coyotes de Thetford Mines	38	18	19	1	164	179	37
Caron & Guay de Beaupré	38	12	24	2	151	225	26
Papetiers de Windsor	38	8	27	3	167	252	19

Division Nike	GP	W	L	OTL	GF	GA	Pts
Rapides de LaSalle	38	25	12	1	180	146	51
Chiefs de Laval	38	24	14	0	184	146	48
Dragons de Saint-Laurent	38	21	14	3	169	160	45
Royaux de Sorel	38	20	18	0	157	169	40
Nova d'Acton Vale	38	15	18	5	149	178	35
Blitz de Granby	38	14	19	5	188	216	33
Blizzard de Joliette	38	14	21	3	155	171	31

== Coupe Futura-Playoffs ==
Won by Rapides de LaSalle.
