= Quebec Rafales =

Professional ice hockey team

- City: Quebec City, Quebec
- League: International Hockey League
- Conference: Eastern
- Division: Northeast
- Founded: 1996
- Folded: 1998
- Home arena: Colisée de Québec
- Colors: Blue, green and orange
- Owner(s): David Berkman

Franchise history
- 1992–1996: Atlanta Knights
- 1996–1998: Quebec Rafales

The Quebec Rafales (French for "wind gust") were a minor professional ice hockey team located in Quebec City, Quebec. The team played two seasons in the International Hockey League before folding in 1998.

== History ==
The franchise was started in Atlanta, Georgia as the Atlanta Knights. David Berkman, a real-estate mogul, had hopes of one day owning an NHL franchise. He used the mass southern expansion of ice hockey in the 1990s to further his goal and founded the Knights in 1992. The team played out of the Omni Coliseum, the former home of the Atlanta Flames and was able to use the large building to achieve a good deal of success. The popularity of the Knights did not go unnoticed, however, and soon the NHL was ready to expand to Georgia. With rumors of a possible NHL franchise swirling, the Knights were unable to extend their lease agreement with the Omni after 1996 and Berkman was forced to relocate the franchise. That summer, the Quebec Nordiques old building, the Colisée de Québec, was looking for a tenant and agreed to be the home for the displaced Knights.

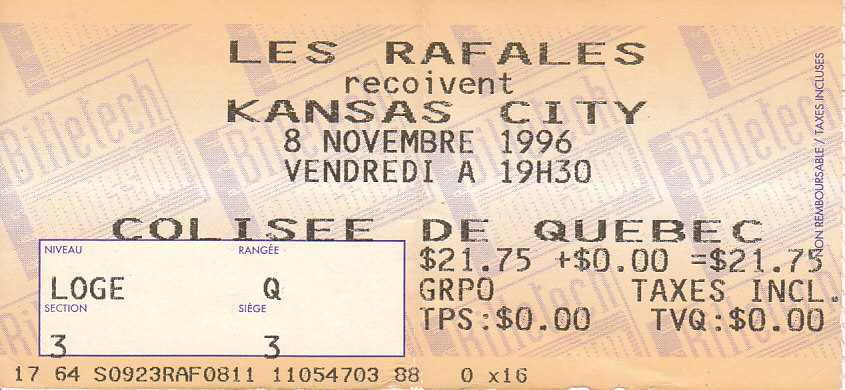
Ticket for a game between the Rafales and the Kansas City Blades in November 1996.

The team was renamed as the 'Quebec Rafales' and began playing the next season. Initially, the club tried to make a splash by signing Chris Simon while he was engaged with a contract holdout with the Colorado Avalanche but an arrangement was never reached. Even without Simon, the Rafales were a big draw in their first season. The team averaged over 11,500 fans per game in 96–97, second only to the Detroit Vipers in terms of minor league teams. With former NHLer Jean Pronovost at the helm, the team finished with a solid record in its first campaign and made the second round of the Turner Cup playoffs, losing to the aforementioned Vipers.

In the Rafales' second season, the team's attendance figures plummeted to nearly half what it had been before. Reporting at the time indicated the team's inaugural attendance number had been inflated due to blanketing the area with free tickets and that the club was only able to sell 800 season tickets for year two. With the crowds much smaller, the team also suffered on the ice. Quebec slipped to the bottom of the standings after a good start and remained there for the rest of the year. When the club's financial situation became dire, the team began shipping off many of its star players in order to lower salary. That, however, was only a temporary solution. Shortly after finishing the season, the Rafales suspended operations have remained dormant ever since.

== Year-by-year record ==
Year	GP	W	L	RT	PTS	Finish	Playoffs
1996-97	82	41	30	11	93	4th, North	Lost quarter-finals
1997-98	82	27	48	7	61	4th, Northern	Out of Playoffs
