= 2000–01 QSPHL season =

Canadian ice hockey league season

The 2000–01 QSPHL season was the fifth season of the Quebec Semi-Pro Hockey League, a minor professional league in the Canadian province of Quebec. 14 teams participated in the regular season, and the Mission de Joliette won the league title.

== Regular season ==
| Division Est | GP | W | L | OTL | SOL | GF | GA | Pts |
|---|---|---|---|---|---|---|---|---|
| Garaga de Saint-Georges | 44 | 32 | 9 | 1 | 2 | 229 | 139 | 67 |
| Prolab de Thetford Mines | 44 | 29 | 8 | 2 | 5 | 233 | 164 | 65 |
| Dubé d'Asbestos | 44 | 24 | 15 | 2 | 3 | 222 | 231 | 53 |
| Grand Portneuf de Pont-Rouge | 44 | 23 | 17 | 1 | 3 | 173 | 162 | 50 |
| Condors de Jonquière | 44 | 22 | 18 | 1 | 3 | 228 | 208 | 48 |
| Papetiers de Windsor | 44 | 16 | 21 | 4 | 3 | 176 | 228 | 39 |
| As de Beaupré | 44 | 15 | 24 | 3 | 2 | 186 | 248 | 35 |

| Division Ouest | GP | W | L | OTL | SOL | GF | GA | Pts |
|---|---|---|---|---|---|---|---|---|
| Mission de Joliette | 44 | 28 | 10 | 1 | 5 | 238 | 170 | 62 |
| Dragons de Saint-Laurent | 44 | 26 | 14 | 1 | 3 | 192 | 178 | 56 |
| Chiefs de Laval | 44 | 25 | 16 | 1 | 2 | 206 | 190 | 53 |
| Royaux de Sorel | 44 | 20 | 22 | 1 | 1 | 181 | 179 | 42 |
| Beaulieu d'Acton Vale | 44 | 18 | 24 | 1 | 1 | 180 | 220 | 38 |
| Rapides de LaSalle | 44 | 16 | 24 | 3 | 1 | 162 | 219 | 36 |
| Blitz de Granby | 44 | 13 | 29 | 1 | 1 | 164 | 230 | 28 |

== Coupe Futura-Playoffs ==
Coupe Futura-Quarterfinals
O1 | Mission de Joliette | 4
O5 | Beaulieu d'Acton Vale | 1
Division Ouest
O2 | Dragons de Saint-Laurent | 4
O3 | Chiefs de Laval | 2
E1 | Garaga de Saint-Georges | 4
E5 | Condors de Jonquière | 0
Division Est
E2 | Prolab de Thetford Mines | 4
E3 | Dubé d'Asbestos | 3

Coupe Futura-Semifinals
O1 | Mission de Joliette | 4
O2 | Dragons de Saint-Laurent | 1
E1 | Garaga de Saint-Georges | 4
E2 | Prolab de Thetford Mines | 0

Coupe Futura-Final
O1 | Mission de Joliette | 4
E1 | Garaga de Saint-Georges | 3
