= 1984–85 QMJHL season =

Canadian junior ice hockey season

The 1984–85 QMJHL season was the 16th season in the history of the Quebec Major Junior Hockey League. The league experimented for one season, awarding one point for an overtime loss. Points for an overtime loss would not be awarded again until the 1999–2000 QMJHL season.

The Plattsburgh Pioneers were admitted to the league as an expansion team, and the first QMJHL franchise based in the United States. It was the second league expansion in three seasons, having added two franchise in the 1982–83 QMJHL season, bringing the league up to twelve teams. The league did not have an expansion draft. The Pioneers featured an all-American lineup of players, who were not playing in the NCAA. The team folded after losing its first 17 games in 1984. Games played against the Pioneers and the points earned, were not included in the final standings. The remaining eleven teams played 68 games each which counted in the regular season standings.

The Shawinigan Cataractes finished first overall in the regular season, winning the Jean Rougeau Trophy. The Verdun Junior Canadiens won the President's Cup, defeating the Chicoutimi Saguenéens in the finals. Coach Jean Bégin had been fired by the Laval Voisins after 19 games, then is hired by the Verdun Junior Canadiens with five games remaining in the season, leading the team to a league championship.

== Team changes ==
- The Verdun Juniors are renamed the Verdun Junior Canadiens.
- The Plattsburgh Pioneers join the league as an expansion franchise, playing in the Lebel Division.
- The Granby Bisons switch to the Dilio Division.

== Final standings ==
Note: GP = Games played; W = Wins; L = Losses; T = Ties; OL = Overtime loss; PTS = Points; GF = Goals for; GA = Goals against

Dilio Division	GP	W	L	T	OTL	Pts	GF	GA
Shawinigan Cataractes	68	48	18	1	1	98	384	255
Chicoutimi Saguenéens	68	41	20	4	3	89	334	288
Drummondville Voltigeurs	68	41	23	4	0	86	379	312
Trois-Rivières Draveurs	68	32	30	1	5	70	317	325
Quebec Remparts	68	30	32	3	3	66	304	368
Granby Bisons	68	22	43	2	1	47	328	428

Lebel Division	GP	W	L	T	OL	Pts	GF	GA
Verdun Junior Canadiens	68	36	27	2	3	77	366	319
Hull Olympiques	68	33	30	1	4	71	347	352
Saint-Jean Castors	68	31	31	1	5	68	347	348
Laval Voisins	68	28	35	1	4	61	314	358
Longueuil Chevaliers	68	21	37	2	8	52	294	361
Plattsburgh Pioneers^{‡}	17	0	16	0	1	1	——	——

^{‡}Games played against the Plattsburgh Pioneers and the points earned, were not included in the final standings.

- complete list of standings.

== Scoring leaders ==
Note: GP = Games played; G = Goals; A = Assists; Pts = Points; PIM = Penalties in Minutes

Player	Team	GP	G	A	Pts	PIM
Guy Rouleau	Longueuil Chevaliers	60	76	87	163	68
Marc Damphousse	Shawinigan Cataractes	68	65	95	160	78
Luc Robitaille	Hull Olympiques	64	55	93	148	115
Sergio Momesso	Shawinigan Cataractes	64	56	90	146	216
Michel Mongeau	Laval Voisins	67	60	84	144	56
Patrick Emond	Chicoutimi Saguenéens	68	57	82	139	24
Guy Benoit	Drummondville Voltigeurs	64	56	79	135	53
Martin Bouliane	Granby Bisons	67	52	82	134	11
Joe Foglietta	Hull Olympiques	66	49	80	129	53
Claude Gagnon	Trois-Rivières Draveurs	68	48	78	126	14

- complete scoring statistics

== Playoffs ==
Claude Lemieux was the leading scorer of the playoffs with 40 points (23 goals, 17 assists).

Quarterfinals

- Shawinigan Cataractes defeated Quebec Remparts 4 games to 0.
- Chicoutimi Saguenéens defeated Saint-Jean Castors 4 games to 1.
- Drummondville Voltigeurs defeated Trois-Rivières Draveurs 4 games to 3.
- Verdun Junior Canadiens defeated Hull Olympiques 4 games to 1.

Semifinals

- Verdun Junior Canadiens defeated Shawinigan Cataractes 4 games to 1.
- Chicoutimi Saguenéens defeated Drummondville Voltigeurs 4 games to 1.

Finals

- Verdun Junior Canadiens defeated Chicoutimi Saguenéens 4 games to 0.

== All-star teams ==
First team

- Goaltender - Daniel Berthiaume, Chicoutimi Saguenéens
- Left defence - Steve Duchesne, Drummondville Voltigeurs
- Right defence - Yves Beaudoin, Shawinigan Cataractes
- Left winger - Sergio Momesso, Shawinigan Cataractes
- Centreman - Guy Rouleau, Longueuil Chevaliers
- Right winger - Claude Lemieux, Verdun Junior Canadiens
- Coach - Ron Lapointe, Shawinigan Cataractes

Second team

- Goaltender - Alain Raymond, Trois-Rivières Draveurs
- Left defence - Steven Finn, Laval Voisins
- Right defence - James Gasseau, Drummondville Voltigeurs
- Left winger - Luc Robitaille, Hull Olympiques
- Centreman - Stephane Richer, Chicoutimi Saguenéens
- Right winger - Marc Damphousse, Shawinigan Cataractes
- Coach - Mario Bazinet, Chicoutimi Saguenéens
- List of First/Second/Rookie team all-stars.

== Trophies and awards ==
Team

- President's Cup - Playoff Champions, Verdun Junior Canadiens
- Jean Rougeau Trophy - Regular Season Champions, Shawinigan Cataractes
- Robert Lebel Trophy - Team with best GAA, Shawinigan Cataractes

Player

- Michel Brière Memorial Trophy - Most Valuable Player, Daniel Berthiaume, Chicoutimi Saguenéens
- Jean Béliveau Trophy - Top Scorer, Guy Rouleau, Longueuil Chevaliers
- Guy Lafleur Trophy - Playoff MVP, Claude Lemieux, Verdun Junior Canadiens
- Jacques Plante Memorial Trophy - Best GAA, Daniel Berthiaume, Chicoutimi Saguenéens
- Emile Bouchard Trophy - Defenceman of the Year, Yves Beaudoin, Shawinigan Cataractes
- Mike Bossy Trophy - Best Pro Prospect, Jose Charbonneau, Drummondville Voltigeurs
- Michel Bergeron Trophy - Offensive Rookie of the Year, Jimmy Carson, Verdun Junior Canadiens
- Raymond Lagacé Trophy - Defensive Rookie of the Year, Robert Desjardins, Shawinigan Cataractes
- Frank J. Selke Memorial Trophy - Most sportsmanlike player, Patrick Emond, Chicoutimi Sagueneens
- Marcel Robert Trophy - Best Scholastic Player, Claude Gosselin, Quebec Remparts

== See also ==
- 1985 Memorial Cup
- 1985 NHL entry draft
- 1984–85 OHL season
- 1984–85 WHL season

Preceded by 1983–84 QMJHL season	QMJHL seasons	Succeeded by 1985–86 QMJHL season
