= 2001–02 QSPHL season =

Canadian ice hockey league season

The 2001–02 QSPHL season was the sixth season of the Quebec Semi-Pro Hockey League, a minor professional league in the Canadian province of Quebec. 15 teams participated in the regular season, and the Chiefs de Laval won the league title.

== Regular season ==
Division Ouest	GP	W	L	OTL	SOL	GF	GA	Pts
Dragons de Verdun	44	31	10	1	2	215	160	65
Chiefs de Laval	44	26	15	2	1	210	186	55
Royaux de Sorel	44	23	15	5	1	204	179	52
Mission de Joliette	44	22	19	2	1	179	186	47
Cousin de Saint-Hyacinthe	44	19	19	5	1	174	173	44
Rapides de LaSalle	44	19	20	1	4	188	218	43
Blitz de Granby	44	18	24	0	2	182	222	38

Division Est	GP	W	L	OTL	SOL	GF	GA	Pts
Garaga de Saint-Georges	44	37	7	0	0	249	119	74
Prolab de Thetford Mines	44	29	14	1	0	198	151	59
As de Québec	44	23	16	3	2	201	173	51
Caron & Guay de Pont-Rouge	44	23	19	0	2	184	153	48
Lacroix de Windsor	44	17	25	1	1	155	186	36
Promutuel de Rivière-du-Loup	44	15	24	2	3	132	236	35
Dubé d'Asbestos	44	14	26	3	1	170	228	32
Condors de Jonquière	44	14	26	1	3	151	222	32

== Coupe Futura-Playoffs ==
Coupe Futura-1/8 Finals	Coupe Futura-Quarterfinals
E2	Prolab de Thetford Mines	4
E7	Dubé d'Asbestos	3
E2	Prolab de Thetford Mines	4
E3	As de Québec	0
E3	As de Québec	4
E6	Promutuel de Rivière-du-Loup	1
Division Est
E1	Garaga de Saint-Georges	4
E8	Condors de Jonquière	1
E1	Garaga de Saint-Georges	3
E4	Caron & Guay de Pont-Rouge	4
E4	Caron & Guay de Pont-Rouge	4
E5	Lacroix de Windsor	1
O2	Chiefs de Laval	4
O6	Rapides de LaSalle	1
O2	Chiefs de Laval	4
O3	Royaux de Sorel	0
O3	Royaux de Sorel
Division Ouest
O1	Dragons de Verdun	4
O7	Blitz de Granby	0
O1	Dragons de Verdun	2
O5	Cousin de Saint-Hyacinthe	4
O5	Cousin de Saint-Hyacinthe

Coupe Futura-Semifinals
E2	Prolab de Thetford Mines	4
E4	Caron & Guay de Pont-Rouge	1
O2	Chiefs de Laval	4
O5	Cousin de Saint-Hyacinthe	2

Coupe Futura-Final
E2	Prolab de Thetford Mines	1
O2	Chiefs de Laval	4
