= 1983–84 QMJHL season =

Canadian junior ice hockey season

The 1983–84 QMJHL season was the 15th season in the history of the Quebec Major Junior Hockey League. Eleven teams played 70 games each in the regular season.

Mario Lemieux of the Laval Voisins scored 133 goals, and had 149 assists, setting the all-time Canadian Hockey League record of 282 points, and 133 goals in a regular season. His total of 149 assists ranks second to Pierre Larouche's total of 157 from the 1973–74 QMJHL season. Lemieux also won four QMHL trophies at the season's end, as well as the CHL Player of the Year award.

The Laval Voisins repeated as first overall in the regular season, winning the Jean Rougeau Trophy, and won their first President's Cup, defeating the Longueuil Chevaliers in the finals.

== Final standings ==
Note: GP = Games played; W = Wins; L = Losses; T = Ties; Pts = Points; GF = Goals for; GA = Goals against

Dilio Division	GP	W	L	T	Pts	GF	GA
Shawinigan Cataractes	70	37	33	0	74	329	287
Quebec Remparts	70	36	32	2	74	338	372
Drummondville Voltigeurs	70	35	35	0	70	355	351
Chicoutimi Saguenéens	70	30	38	2	62	303	382
Trois-Rivières Draveurs	70	23	45	2	48	301	388

Lebel Division	GP	W	L	T	Pts	GF	GA
Laval Voisins	70	54	16	0	108	527	289
Verdun Juniors	70	40	27	3	83	359	309
Longueuil Chevaliers	70	37	33	0	74	371	358
Saint-Jean Castors	70	30	36	4	64	366	363
Granby Bisons	70	31	38	1	63	308	348
Hull Olympiques	70	25	45	0	50	301	411

- complete list of standings.

== Scoring leaders ==
Note: GP = Games played; G = Goals; A = Assists; Pts = Points; PIM = Penalties in Minutes

Player	Team	GP	G	A	Pts	PIM
Mario Lemieux	Laval Voisins	70	133	149	282	92
Jacques Goyette	Laval Voisins	62	76	94	170	64
Claude Gosselin	Quebec Remparts	65	56	84	140	55
Claude Lefebvre	Quebec Remparts	70	62	73	135	110
Guy Rouleau	Longueuil Chevaliers	70	60	73	133	28
Sergio Momesso	Shawinigan Cataractes	68	42	88	130	235
Francois Sills	Laval Voisins	70	56	73	129	39
Paul Gagne	Chicoutimi Saguenéens	62	51	73	124	8
Santino Pellegrino	Longueuil Chevaliers	70	52	72	124	62
Yves Courteau	Laval Voisins	62	45	75	120	52

- complete scoring statistics

== Playoffs ==
Mario Lemieux was the leading scorer of the playoffs with 52 points (29 goals, 23 assists).

Quarterfinals

- Laval Voisins defeated Granby Bisons 4 games to 0.
- Verdun Juniors defeated Saint-Jean Castors 4 games to 0.
- Drummondville Voltigeurs defeated Shawinigan Cataractes 4 games to 2.
- Longueuil Chevaliers defeated Quebec Remparts 4 games to 1.

Semifinals

- Laval Voisins defeated Drummondville Voltigeurs 4 games to 0.
- Longueuil Chevaliers defeated Verdun Juniors 4 games to 2.

Finals

- Laval Voisins defeated Longueuil Chevaliers 4 games to 2.

== All-star teams ==
First team

- Goaltender - Alain Raymond, Trois-Rivières Draveurs
- Left defence - Steven Finn, Laval Voisins
- Right defence - Billy Campbell, Verdun Juniors
- Left winger - Claude Gosselin, Quebec Remparts
- Centreman - Mario Lemieux, Laval Voisins
- Right winger - Jacques Goyette, Laval Voisins
- Coach - Pierre Creamer, Verdun Juniors

Second team

- Goaltender - Luc Guenette, Quebec Remparts
- Left defence - Jerome Carrier, Verdun Juniors
- Right defence - Sylvain Cote, Quebec Remparts
- Left winger - Yves Courteau, Laval Voisins
- Centreman - Claude Lebebvre, Quebec Remparts
- Right winger - Claude Lemieux, Verdun Juniors
- Coach - Jean Bégin, Laval Voisins

List of First/Second/Rookie team all-stars

== Trophies and awards ==
Team

- President's Cup - Playoff Champions, Laval Voisins
- Jean Rougeau Trophy - Regular Season Champions, Laval Voisins
- Robert Lebel Trophy - Team with best GAA, Shawinigan Cataractes

Player

- Michel Brière Memorial Trophy - Most Valuable Player, Mario Lemieux, Laval Voisins
- Jean Béliveau Trophy - Top Scorer, Mario Lemieux, Laval Voisins
- Guy Lafleur Trophy - Playoff MVP, Mario Lemieux, Laval Voisins
- Jacques Plante Memorial Trophy - Best GAA, Tony Haladuick, Laval Voisins
- Emile Bouchard Trophy - Defenceman of the Year, Billy Campbell, Verdun Juniors
- Mike Bossy Trophy - Best Pro Prospect, Mario Lemieux, Laval Voisins
- Michel Bergeron Trophy - Offensive Rookie of the Year, Stephane Richer, Granby Bisons
- Raymond Lagacé Trophy - Defensive Rookie of the Year, James Gasseau, Drummondville Voltigeurs
- Frank J. Selke Memorial Trophy - Most sportsmanlike player, Jerome Carrier, Verdun Juniors
- Marcel Robert Trophy - Best Scholastic Player, Gilbert Paiement, Chicoutimi Saguenéens

== See also ==
- 1984 Memorial Cup
- 1984 NHL entry draft
- 1983–84 OHL season
- 1983–84 WHL season

Preceded by 1982–83 QMJHL season	QMJHL seasons	Succeeded by 1984–85 QMJHL season
