= 2002–03 QSPHL season =

Canadian ice hockey league season

The 2002–03 QSPHL season was the seventh season of the Quebec Semi-Pro Hockey League, a minor professional league in the Canadian province of Quebec. 15 teams participated in the regular season, and the Chiefs de Laval won the league title.

== Regular season ==
| Division Ouest | GP | W | L | OTL | SOL | GF | GA | Pts |
|---|---|---|---|---|---|---|---|---|
| Cousin de Saint-Hyacinthe | 52 | 34 | 13 | 2 | 3 | 190 | 151 | 73 |
| Chiefs de Laval | 52 | 31 | 18 | 1 | 2 | 236 | 176 | 65 |
| Dragons de Verdun | 52 | 31 | 19 | 1 | 1 | 229 | 190 | 64 |
| Mission de Saint-Jean | 52 | 29 | 19 | 2 | 2 | 215 | 223 | 62 |
| Royaux de Sorel | 52 | 19 | 30 | 2 | 1 | 184 | 242 | 41 |
| Prédateurs de Granby | 52 | 10 | 37 | 3 | 2 | 152 | 251 | 25 |
| Rapides de LaSalle | 24 | 5 | 14 | 3 | 2 | 63 | 96 | 15 |

| Division Est | GP | W | L | OTL | SOL | GF | GA | Pts |
|---|---|---|---|---|---|---|---|---|
| Prolab de Thetford Mines | 52 | 46 | 5 | 0 | 1 | 246 | 116 | 93 |
| Garaga de Saint-Georges | 52 | 42 | 10 | 0 | 0 | 264 | 164 | 84 |
| Caron & Guay de Pont-Rouge | 52 | 35 | 11 | 4 | 2 | 234 | 158 | 76 |
| Paramédic du Saguenay | 52 | 24 | 25 | 2 | 1 | 214 | 226 | 51 |
| Lacroix de Windsor | 52 | 22 | 27 | 1 | 2 | 184 | 209 | 47 |
| Promutuel de Rivière-du-Loup | 52 | 19 | 28 | 1 | 4 | 196 | 243 | 43 |
| As de Québec | 52 | 16 | 32 | 3 | 1 | 178 | 256 | 36 |
| Aztèques d'Asbestos | 52 | 13 | 35 | 2 | 2 | 161 | 245 | 30 |

== Coupe Futura-Playoffs ==
Coupe Futura-1/8 Finals | Coupe Futura-Quarterfinals
E1 | Prolab de Thetford Mines | 3
E8 | Aztèques d'Asbestos | 0
E1 | Prolab de Thetford Mines | 4
E5 | Lacroix de Windsor | 1
E4 | Paramédic du Saguenay | 1
E5 | Lacroix de Windsor | 3
Division Est
E2 | Garaga de Saint-Georges | 3
E7 | As de Québec | 0
E2 | Garaga de Saint-Georges | 1
E3 | Caron & Guay de Pont-Rouge | 4
E3 | Caron & Guay de Pont-Rouge | 3
E6 | Promutuel de Rivière-du-Loup | 1
O2 | Chiefs de Laval
Bye
O2 | Chiefs de Laval | 4
O3 | Dragons de Verdun | 2
O3 | Dragons de Verdun | 3
O6 | Blitz de Granby | 0
Division Ouest
O1 | Cousin de Saint-Hyacinthe
Byes=
O1 | Cousin de Saint-Hyacinthe | 2
O4 | Mission de Saint-Jean | 4
O4 | Mission de Saint-Jean | 3
O5 | Royaux de Sorel | 1

Coupe Futura-Semifinals
E1 | Prolab de Thetford Mines | 4
E3 | Caron & Guay de Pont-Rouge | 3
O2 | Chiefs de Laval | 4
O4 | Mission de Saint-Jean | 1

Coupe Futura-Final
E1 | Prolab de Thetford Mines | 3
O2 | Chiefs de Laval | 4
