= 2003–04 QSPHL season =

Canadian ice hockey league season

The 2003–04 QSPHL season was the eighth season of the Quebec Semi-Pro Hockey League, a minor professional league in the Canadian province of Quebec. 14 teams participated in the regular season, and the Dragons de Verdun won the league title.

== Regular season ==
| Division Ouest | GP | W | L | OTL | SOL | GF | GA | Pts |
|---|---|---|---|---|---|---|---|---|
| Dragons de Verdun | 50 | 36 | 12 | 1 | 1 | 281 | 189 | 74 |
| Mission de Saint-Jean | 50 | 30 | 20 | 0 | 0 | 240 | 190 | 60 |
| Cousin de Saint-Hyacinthe | 50 | 26 | 22 | 1 | 1 | 191 | 194 | 54 |
| Saint-François de Sherbrooke | 50 | 25 | 21 | 3 | 1 | 202 | 209 | 54 |
| Chiefs de Laval | 50 | 24 | 24 | 0 | 2 | 194 | 209 | 50 |
| Royaux de Sorel | 50 | 21 | 26 | 2 | 1 | 188 | 201 | 45 |
| Prédateurs de Granby | 50 | 19 | 26 | 3 | 2 | 193 | 255 | 43 |

| Division Est | GP | W | L | OTL | SOL | GF | GA | Pts |
|---|---|---|---|---|---|---|---|---|
| Prolab de Thetford Mines | 50 | 40 | 8 | 1 | 1 | 252 | 152 | 82 |
| Garaga de Saint-Georges | 50 | 38 | 10 | 0 | 2 | 231 | 134 | 78 |
| Caron & Guay de Pont-Rouge | 50 | 25 | 16 | 3 | 6 | 200 | 185 | 59 |
| Radio X de Québec | 50 | 20 | 26 | 2 | 2 | 175 | 219 | 44 |
| Promutuel de Rivière-du-Loup | 50 | 18 | 25 | 4 | 3 | 162 | 234 | 43 |
| Paramédic du Saguenay | 50 | 18 | 27 | 4 | 1 | 178 | 219 | 41 |
| Vikings de Trois-Rivières | 50 | 10 | 36 | 2 | 2 | 143 | 240 | 24 |

== Coupe Futura-Playoffs ==
Coupe Futura-Quarterfinals
O1 | Dragons de Verdun | 4
O4 | Saint-François de Sherbrooke | 0
Division Ouest
O2 | Mission de Saint-Jean | 4
O3 | Cousin de Saint-Hyacinthe | 1
E1 | Prolab de Thetford Mines | 4
E5 | Promutuel de Rivière-du-Loup | 0
Division Est
E2 | Garaga de Saint-Georges | 4
E3 | Caron & Guay de Pont-Rouge | 1

Coupe Futura-Semifinals
O1 | Dragons de Verdun | 4
O2 | Mission de Saint-Jean | 2
E1 | Prolab de Thetford Mines | 2
E2 | Garaga de Saint-Georges | 4

Coupe Futura-Final
O1 | Dragons de Verdun | 4
E2 | Garaga de Saint-Georges | 3
