= Trois-Rivières Draveurs (LNAH) =

- City: Trois-Rivières, Quebec
- League: LNAH
- Founded: 2004
- Folded: 2018
- Home arena: Colisée de Trois-Rivières
- Colours: Orange, navy blue, white
- Owner(s): Étienne Boileau, Ian Quint, Chris and Alex Karambatsos
- General manager: Étienne Boileau
- Head coach: Alain Côté

Franchise history
- 1996–2001: Pont-Rouge Grand Portneuf
- 2001–2004: Pont-Rouge Caron & Guay
- 2004–2013: Trois-Rivières Caron & Guay
- 2013–2014: Trois-Rivières Vikings
- 2014–2017: Trois-Rivières Blizzard
- 2017–2018: Trois-Rivières Draveurs

Championships
- Playoff championships: 1 (2007–08)

The Trois-Rivières Draveurs (French: Les Draveurs de Trois-Rivières) were an ice hockey team based in Trois-Rivières, Quebec. The team was part of the Ligue Nord-Américaine de Hockey (LNAH) and played at the Colisée de Trois-Rivières.

The team started in Pont-Rouge, Quebec in 1996–97 as the Pont-Rouge Grand Portneuf and became the Pont-Rouge Caron & Guay in 2001–02 before moving to Trois-Rivières in 2004–05.

The team was known as the Trois-Rivières Caron & Guay until the 2013–14 season when the team name was changed to the Trois-Rivières Vikings. Before the 2014–15 season, the name was changed again, to the Trois-Rivières Blizzard. In July 2017, it was announced that the club had been renamed to Trois-Rivières Draveurs following a change in ownership. The new name was taken from the former major junior ice hockey team which competed in the Quebec Major Junior Hockey League from 1973 to 1992. The new ownership had its membership revoked from the LNAH after one season.
