= Verdun Dragons =

Ice hockey team

- City: Verdun
- League: Ligue Nord-Américaine de Hockey (LNAH)
- Operated: 2001-2006

The Verdun Dragons were a minor semi-professional ice hockey team based in the Montreal borough of Verdun, Quebec, Canada from 2001 through 2006. The team played at the Verdun Auditorium.

The team was part of the Quebec Semi-Pro Hockey League (QSPHL), which was formally renamed as the Ligue Nord-Américaine de Hockey (LNAH) in 2004.

Initially, the Dragons were based in Haut-Richelieu, Quebec for the 1996–97 season. The next season, they moved to Iberville, Quebec but played only one season there before moving once again to Saint-Laurent, Quebec. They played in Saint-Laurent for three seasons before moving to Verdun in 2001.

The team won the Coupe Futura (English: Futura Cup) against the Saint-Georges Garaga in 2003–2004.

In their final season before folding, they were named the Verdun-Montréal Dragons.

== Verdun Dragons LNAH seasons ==
Stats by season
Season	Games played	Wins	Losses	Ties	OT losses	Shoot-out losses	Points	Ranking	Playoffs
2005–2006	56	31	19	0	2	4	68	4^{th} place	Quarterfinals
2004–2005	60	35	22	3	0	0	73	5^{th} place	Quarterfinals
2003–2004	50	36	12	1	0	1	74	1^{st} place, division Ouest	Won the Futura Cup (Coupe Futura)
2002–2003	52	31	19	1	1	0	64	3^{rd} place division Est	Division semifinals
2001–2002	44	31	10	1	2	0	65	1^{st} place, division Est	Division semifinals
