= Sorel Royaux =

Canadian ice hockey team (1996–2004)

- City: Sorel-Tracy, Quebec
- League: Quebec Semi-Pro Hockey League
- Founded: 1996
- Folded: 2004

Franchise history
- 1996–1999: Sorel Dinosaures
- 1999–2004: Sorel Royaux

The Sorel Royaux were a Canadian minor semi-pro ice hockey team in Sorel-Tracy, Quebec. They played in the Quebec Semi-Pro Hockey League for eight seasons, from 1996 to 2004. The club was founded in 1996 as the Sorel Dinosaures, they changed their name to Sorel Royaux in 1999.
