= Yves Sarault =

Canadian ice hockey player and coach

- Born: December 23, 1972 (age 53) Salaberry-de-Valleyfield, Quebec, Canada
- Height: 6 ft 1 in (185 cm)
- Weight: 200 lb (91 kg; 14 st 4 lb)
- Position: Left wing
- Shot: Left
- Played for: Montreal Canadiens; Calgary Flames; Colorado Avalanche; Ottawa Senators; Atlanta Thrashers; Nashville Predators; SC Bern; Genève-Servette HC; HC Davos; EHC Basel; ERC Ingolstadt; Vienna Capitals
- NHL draft: 61st overall, 1991; Montreal Canadiens
- Playing career: 1992–2014

Yves Victor Sarault (born December 23, 1972) is a Canadian former professional ice hockey player and coach. He played 106 games in the National Hockey League for the Montreal Canadiens, Calgary Flames, Colorado Avalanche, Ottawa Senators, Atlanta Thrashers and the Nashville Predators between 1995 and 2001. He is currently serving as an assistant coach of HC Fribourg-Gottéron in the National League (NL).

== Playing career ==
As a youth, Sarault played in the 1985 Quebec International Pee-Wee Hockey Tournament with a minor ice hockey team from Salaberry-de-Valleyfield.

Sarault was drafted 61st overall by the Canadiens in the 1991 NHL entry draft. From July 18, 2008, he played for German team ERC Ingolstadt in DEL after previous spells with EHC Basel, SC Bern, Genève-Servette HC and HC Davos in the Swiss NLA league from 2002 to 2008. Sarault has also participated for Team Canada in the Spengler Cup.

After initially starting the 2009–10 season with lower professional league team Rivière-du-Loup CIMT in the LNAH, Sarault left for Europe on December 16, 2009, signing for the remainder of the season with the Vienna Capitals of the Austrian Erste Bank Hockey League. After returning to Rivière-du-Loup for a further two seasons, Sarault was traded at the draft to the Cornwall River Kings fon June 17, 2012.

== Coaching career ==
He joined the staff of Swiss club Lausanne HC as an assistant in 2014 and was promoted to the head coaching position during the 2017-18 season after the sacking of Dan Ratushny. On February 8, 2018, Sarault was relieved of his duties after five straight losses.

On January 22, 2021, Sarault was named head coach of EHC Visp in the Swiss League (SL). He led the team to the playoffs but were swept in the quarterfinals by future SL champion, HC Ajoie. Sarault was not renewed as head coach following the 2020–21 season.

Sarault working as a hockey analyst for the National League's official broadcaster, MySports, before returning to the coaching ranks with accepting the head coaching role with SCL Tigers of the NL on January 16, 2022.

== Personal life ==
His daughter Courtney Sarault is a short track speed skater and represented Canada at the 2022 Winter Olympics and the 2026 Winter Olympics where she won four medals as a member of the short track relay team.

== Career statistics ==
=== Regular season and playoffs ===
			Regular season					Playoffs
Season	Team	League	GP	G	A	Pts	PIM	GP	G	A	Pts	PIM
1987–88	Lac St-Louis Lions	QMAAA	4	0	0	0	4	—	—	—	—	—
1988–89	Lac St-Louis Lions	QMAAA	42	23	30	53	64	3	2	3	5	4
1989–90	Victoriaville Tigres	QMJHL	70	12	28	40	140	16	0	3	3	26
1990–91	St-Jean Lynx	QMJHL	56	22	24	46	113	—	—	—	—	—
1991–92	St-Jean Lynx	QMJHL	50	28	38	66	96	—	—	—	—	—
1991–92	Trois-Rivières Draveurs	QMJHL	18	15	14	29	12	15	10	10	20	18
1992–93	Wheeling Thunderbirds	ECHL	2	1	3	4	0	—	—	—	—	—
1992–93	Fredericton Canadiens	AHL	59	14	17	31	41	3	0	1	1	2
1993–94	Fredericton Canadiens	AHL	60	13	14	27	72	—	—	—	—	—
1994–95	Fredericton Canadiens	AHL	69	24	21	45	96	13	2	1	3	33
1994–95	Montreal Canadiens	NHL	8	0	1	1	0	—	—	—	—	—
1995–96	Montreal Canadiens	NHL	14	0	0	0	4	—	—	—	—	—
1995–96	Calgary Flames	NHL	11	2	1	3	4	—	—	—	—	—
1995–96	Saint John Flames	AHL	26	10	12	22	34	16	6	2	8	33
1996–97	Hershey Bears	AHL	6	2	3	5	8	—	—	—	—	—
1996–97	Colorado Avalanche	NHL	28	2	1	3	6	5	0	0	0	2
1997–98	Hershey Bears	AHL	63	23	36	59	43	7	1	2	3	14
1997–98	Colorado Avalanche	NHL	2	1	0	1	0	—	—	—	—	—
1998–99	Ottawa Senators	NHL	11	0	1	1	4	—	—	—	—	—
1998–99	Detroit Vipers	IHL	36	11	12	23	52	11	7	2	9	40
1999–00	Grand Rapids Griffins	IHL	62	17	26	43	77	17	7	4	11	32
1999–00	Ottawa Senators	NHL	11	0	2	2	7	—	—	—	—	—
2000–01	Orlando Solar Bears	IHL	35	17	17	34	42	—	—	—	—	—
2000–01	Atlanta Thrashers	NHL	20	5	4	9	26	—	—	—	—	—
2001–02	Nashville Predators	NHL	1	0	0	0	0	—	—	—	—	—
2001–02	Milwaukee Admirals	AHL	27	5	5	10	24	—	—	—	—	—
2001–02	Philadelphia Phantoms	AHL	7	0	2	2	9	5	0	0	0	6
2002–03	Springfield Falcons	AHL	4	1	1	2	10	—	—	—	—	—
2002–03	Thetford Mines Prolab	QSPHL	7	4	9	13	6	—	—	—	—	—
2002–03	SC Bern	NLA	14	4	10	14	59	13	4	6	10	26
2003–04	SC Bern	NLA	40	15	30	45	115	15	6	7	13	36
2004–05	SC Bern	NLA	41	11	21	32	118	2	0	0	0	4
2005–06	Genève-Servette HC	NLA	38	8	16	24	127	—	—	—	—	—
2006–07	HC Davos	NLA	15	6	4	10	20	10	2	2	4	22
2006–07	SC Langenthal	NLB	5	5	5	10	4	—	—	—	—	—
2007–08	EHC Basel	NLA	38	7	16	23	127	—	—	—	—	—
2007–08	EHC Olten	NLB	3	1	2	3	4	—	—	—	—	—
2008–09	ERC Ingolstadt	DEL	40	8	9	17	108	—	—	—	—	—
2009–10	Rivière-du-Loup CIMT	LNAH	2	1	2	3	0	—	—	—	—	—
2009–10	Vienna Capitals	EBEL	17	3	6	9	38	11	1	2	3	12
2010–11	Rivière-du-Loup 3L	LNAH	16	7	12	19	14	—	—	—	—	—
2011–12	Rivière-du-Loup 3L	LNAH	20	8	13	21	26	—	—	—	—	—
2012–13	Cornwall River Kings	LNAH	22	4	15	19	32	—	—	—	—	—
2013–14	Cornwall River Kings	LNAH	7	3	3	6	4	—	—	—	—	—
AHL totals			321	92	111	203	337	44	9	6	15	88
NHL totals			106	10	10	20	51	5	0	0	0	2
