= François Groleau =

Canadian ice hockey player

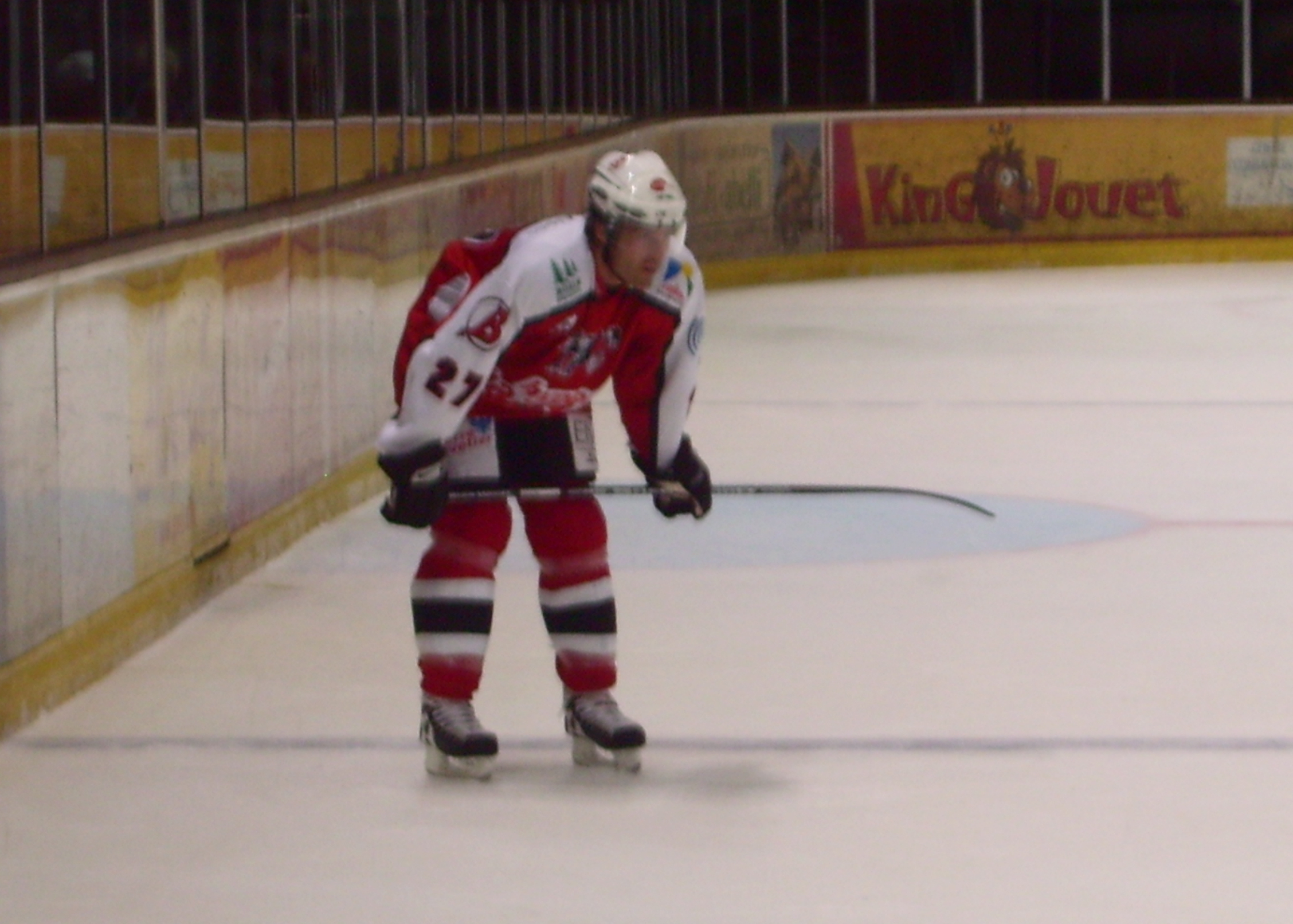
- Born: January 23, 1973 (age 53) Longueuil, Quebec, Canada
- Height: 6 ft 0 in (183 cm)
- Weight: 197 lb (89 kg; 14 st 1 lb)
- Position: Defence
- Shot: Left
- Played for: Montreal Canadiens; Augsburger Panther; Adler Mannheim; Füchse Duisburg; EHC Black Wings Linz
- NHL draft: 41st overall, 1991; Calgary Flames
- Playing career: 1993–2013

François Groleau (born January 23, 1973) is a Canadian former professional ice hockey defenceman who played eight games in the National Hockey League for the Montreal Canadiens over three seasons between 1996 and 1997. The rest of his career, which lasted from 1993 to 2013, was mainly spent in the minor leagues and then in the Deutsche Eishockey Liga.

== Playing career ==
As a youth, Groleau played in the 1985 and 1986 Quebec International Pee-Wee Hockey Tournaments with a minor ice hockey team from Rive-Sud.

Groleau was drafted 41st overall by the Calgary Flames in the 1991 NHL entry draft. He spent two seasons in the American Hockey League with the Saint John Flames before he was traded to the Quebec Nordiques in March 1995 for Ed Ward. He finished the 1994–95 season in the AHL with the Cornwall Aces.

He signed with the Montreal Canadiens in July 1995 and played eight NHL games for the team over three seasons, scoring one assist. He spent most of his tenure in the AHL with the Fredericton Canadiens and also spent a season in the International Hockey League with the San Francisco Spiders.

With his NHL career now at an end, Groleau moved to Germany in 1998, playing one season in the Deutsche Eishockey Liga for the Augsburger Panther. He then returned to the AHL with the Quebec Citadelles again for one season. In 2000, Groleau returned to the DEL, signing for Adler Mannheim. He spent five seasons with the team, winning the league title in 2001 and the German Cup in 2003. He signed for the Füchse Duisburg in 2005, but the team finished bottom of the league. He signed for EHC Black Wings Linz in 2006. After his second season with the Black Wings, Groleau spent two years in France with Diables Rouges de Briançon before returning to Canada to play with Thetford Mines Isothermic in 2010–11.

== Career statistics ==
=== Regular season and playoffs ===
			Regular season					Playoffs
Season	Team	League	GP	G	A	Pts	PIM	GP	G	A	Pts	PIM
1988–89	Sainte-Foy Gouverneurs	QMAAA	42	3	24	27	42	13	1	7	8	28
1989–90	Shawinigan Cataractes	QMJHL	66	11	54	65	80	6	0	1	1	12
1990–91	Shawinigan Cataractes	QMJHL	70	9	60	69	70	6	0	3	3	2
1991–92	Shawinigan Cataractes	QMJHL	65	8	70	78	74	10	5	15	20	8
1992–93	Shawinigan Cataractes	QMJHL	33	4	24	28	50	—	—	—	—	—
1992–93	Saint-Jean Lynx	QMJHL	15	3	14	17	16	4	0	1	1	14
1993–94	Saint John Flames	AHL	73	8	14	22	49	7	0	1	1	2
1994–95	Saint John Flames	AHL	65	6	34	40	28	—	—	—	—	—
1994–95	Cornwall Aces	AHL	8	1	2	3	7	14	2	7	9	16
1995–96	San Francisco Spiders	IHL	63	6	26	32	60	—	—	—	—	—
1995–96	Fredericton Canadiens	AHL	12	3	5	8	10	10	1	6	7	14
1995–96	Montreal Canadiens	NHL	2	0	1	1	2	—	—	—	—	—
1996–97	Fredericton Canadiens	AHL	47	8	24	32	43	—	—	—	—	—
1996–97	Montreal Canadiens	NHL	5	0	0	0	4	—	—	—	—	—
1997–98	Fredericton Canadiens	AHL	63	14	26	40	70	4	0	2	2	4
1997–98	Montreal Canadiens	NHL	1	0	0	0	0	—	—	—	—	—
1998–99	Augsburger Panther	DEL	52	9	21	30	67	5	0	4	4	4
1999–00	Quebec Citadelles	AHL	63	7	24	31	48	3	0	2	2	0
2000–01	Adler Mannheim	DEL	59	2	16	18	52	4	0	0	0	2
2001–02	Adler Mannheim	DEL	60	2	7	9	72	12	1	1	2	10
2002–03	Adler Mannheim	DEL	43	2	8	10	56	8	0	2	2	6
2003–04	Adler Mannheim	DEL	52	2	20	22	58	6	1	0	1	4
2004–05	Adler Mannheim	DEL	40	1	6	7	42	14	0	1	1	32
2005–06	Füchse Duisburg	DEL	32	1	14	15	34	—	—	—	—	—
2006–07	EHC Black Wings Linz	EBEL	56	4	33	37	110	3	0	1	1	0
2007–08	EHC Black Wings Linz	EBEL	46	4	18	22	54	11	2	4	6	16
2008–09	Diables Rouges de Briançon	FRA	21	5	17	22	16	12	3	2	5	16
2009–10	Diables Rouges de Briançon	FRA	23	6	20	26	40	9	0	6	6	12
2010–11	Thetford Mines Isothermic	LNAH	34	5	32	37	14	9	0	5	5	6
2011–12	Thetford Mines Isothermic	LNAH	17	0	11	11	4	8	0	6	6	6
2012–13	Thetford Mines Isothermic	LNAH	12	0	13	13	12	4	0	4	4	0
2015–16	Thetford Assurancia	LNAH	9	0	2	2	4	1	0	0	0	0
DEL totals			370	20	95	115	427	49	2	8	10	58
NHL totals			8	0	1	1	6	—	—	—	—	—
