= Stéphane Fiset =

Canadian ice hockey player

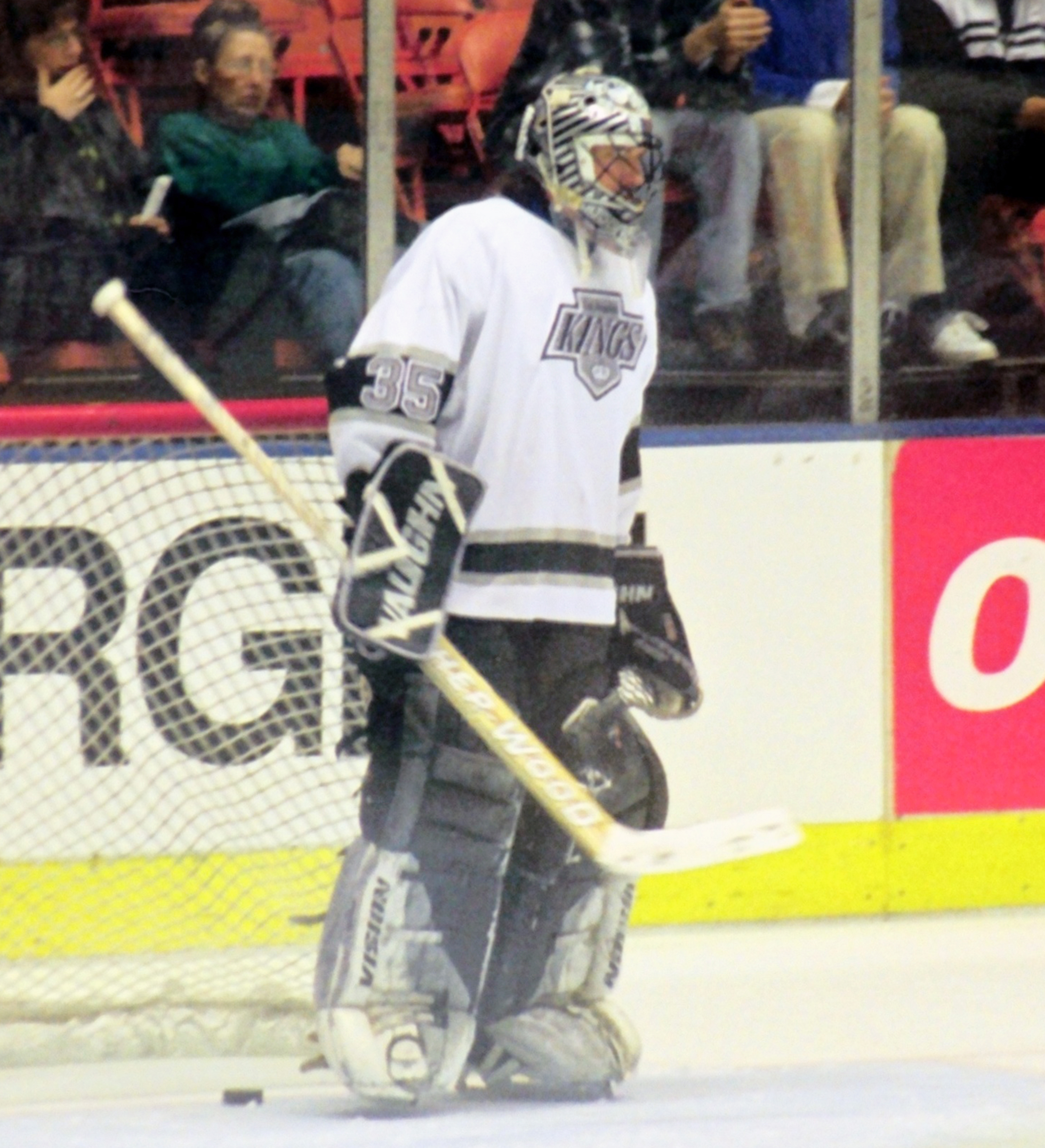
- Fiset with the Los Angeles Kings c. 1997
- Born: June 17, 1970 (age 56) Montreal, Quebec, Canada
- Height: 6 ft 1 in (185 cm)
- Weight: 235 lb (107 kg; 16 st 11 lb)
- Position: Goaltender
- Caught: Left
- Played for: Quebec Nordiques; Colorado Avalanche; Los Angeles Kings; Montreal Canadiens
- National team: Canada
- NHL draft: 24th overall, 1988; Quebec Nordiques
- Playing career: 1990–2002

Stéphane Fiset (born June 17, 1970) is a Canadian former professional ice hockey goaltender who played in the National Hockey League.

== Playing career ==
Fiset was drafted in the 2nd round, 24th overall, in the 1988 NHL entry draft by the Quebec Nordiques. He played 34 minutes in 6 games in his rookie season with Quebec, playing behind Ron Tugnutt, as well as a host of other goalies who got time that season. Fiset got his first NHL victory on October 29, 1991 against the Winnipeg Jets in Le Colisee de Quebec, by a score of 7–2. Over the next few years, Fiset bounced from the NHL to the Nordiques' minor league affiliates, slowly gaining more and more time in net for the Nordiques. After the 1992–93 season, Ron Hextall was traded to the New York Islanders, opening the door for Fiset to be the starter. Fiset did not disappoint. Within two years, Quebec finished first in the Eastern Conference, during the shortened 1994–95 lockout season.

When Quebec moved to Colorado, the future looked bright for Fiset and the Avalanche. This soon changed. He split time with Jocelyn Thibault in the beginning of the season. However, when Patrick Roy was traded to Colorado from Montreal, Fiset became his backup. Fiset was a part of the 1996 Stanley Cup winning team, but was traded to the Los Angeles Kings a few days later. He was the Kings' first choice starter until the 1999–2000 season, where he split time with Jamie Storr. In the 2000–01 season a knee injury inflicted in a collision with the Mighty Ducks of Anaheim's Dan Bylsma kept him out of 25 games, followed by a second knee injury that kept him out for another 31 games, reducing Fiset to only 7 games played. After the Kings acquired Félix Potvin as insurance, he then effectively lost his starting position and although still hampered by his knees, was traded at the back end of the 2001–02 season to the Montreal Canadiens, but only played two games. With persistent health issues over the previous two years and loss of form Fiset announced his retirement on September 9, 2002.

== International play ==
Medal record

Representing Canada

Ice hockey

World Championships
Gold medal – first place	1994 Milan	

World Junior Championships
Gold medal – first place	1990 Helsinki	

Fiset played in the 1989 Junior World Championships, as well as in 1990. In '89 Canada finished fourth, and Fiset was pulled in a 7–1 drubbing by the Soviet Union after giving up 6 goals. He followed this up in 1990 with a great showing. Team Canada had a gold medal finish and the IIHF Directorate Top Goalie Award. He played in 2 games (and won both of them) during Canada's 1994 IIHF World Championship gold medal victory.

== Goalie masks ==
Fiset wore one of the most recognizable goalie masks in the history of the NHL. The design is an ice wall reminiscent of the Quebec Nordiques' igloo logo. The fleur-de-lis, the Nordiques alternate logo, was on each ear of the mask. When he played for the Los Angeles Kings, he also donned a memorable mask with the face of King Tut as it appeared on the Pharaoh's tomb.

== Career statistics ==
=== Regular season and playoffs ===
			Regular season									Playoffs
Season	Team	League	GP	W	L	T	MIN	GA	SO	GAA	SV%	GP	W	L	MIN	GA	SO	GAA	SV%
1987–88	Victoriaville Tigres	QMJHL	40	15	9	4	2221	46	1	3.94	.875	2	0	2	163	10	0	3.68	—
1988–89	Victoriaville Tigres	QMJHL	43	25	14	3	2401	138	1	3.45	—	12	9	2	711	33	0	2.78	—
1989–90	Victoriaville Tigres	QMJHL	24	14	6	4	1383	63	1	2.73	—	14	7	6	790	49	0	3.72	—
1989–90	Quebec Nordiques	NHL	6	0	5	1	342	34	0	5.96	.829	—	—	—	—	—	—	—	—
1990–91	Halifax Citadels	AHL	36	10	15	8	1902	131	0	4.13	.874	—	—	—	—	—	—	—	—
1990–91	Quebec Nordiques	NHL	3	0	2	1	186	12	0	3.87	.902	—	—	—	—	—	—	—	—
1991–92	Halifax Citadels	AHL	29	8	14	6	1675	110	3	3.94	.888	—	—	—	—	—	—	—	—
1991–92	Quebec Nordiques	NHL	23	7	10	2	1133	71	1	3.76	.890	—	—	—	—	—	—	—	—
1992–93	Halifax Citadels	AHL	3	2	1	0	180	11	0	3.67	.892	—	—	—	—	—	—	—	—
1992–93	Quebec Nordiques	NHL	37	18	9	4	1939	110	0	3.40	.884	1	0	0	21	1	0	2.86	.923
1993–94	Cornwall Aces	AHL	1	0	1	0	60	4	0	4.00	.826	—	—	—	—	—	—	—	—
1993–94	Quebec Nordiques	NHL	50	20	25	4	2798	158	2	3.39	.890	—	—	—	—	—	—	—	—
1994–95	Quebec Nordiques	NHL	32	17	10	3	1879	87	2	2.78	.910	4	1	2	209	16	0	4.59	.878
1995–96	Colorado Avalanche	NHL	37	22	6	7	2107	103	1	2.93	.898	1	0	0	0	0	0	0.00	.000
1996–97	Los Angeles Kings	NHL	44	13	24	5	2482	132	4	3.19	.906	—	—	—	—	—	—	—	—
1997–98	Los Angeles Kings	NHL	60	26	25	8	3497	158	2	2.71	.909	2	0	2	93	7	0	4.52	.897
1998–99	Los Angeles Kings	NHL	42	18	21	1	2403	104	3	2.60	.915	—	—	—	—	—	—	—	—
1999–00	Los Angeles Kings	NHL	47	20	15	7	2592	119	1	2.75	.901	4	0	3	200	10	0	3.00	.898
2000–01	Lowell Lock Monsters	AHL	3	1	0	2	190	9	0	2.84	.909	—	—	—	—	—	—	—	—
2000–01	Los Angeles Kings	NHL	7	3	0	1	318	19	0	3.58	.853	1	0	0	0	0	0	0.00	1.000
2001–02	Manchester Monarchs	AHL	23	7	7	6	1228	64	0	3.13	.902	—	—	—	—	—	—	—	—
2001–02	Montreal Canadiens	NHL	2	0	1	0	109	7	0	3.85	.883	1	0	0	38	3	0	4.72	.842
NHL totals			390	164	153	44	21,785	1114	16	3.07	.899	14	1	7	562	37	0	3.95	.888

=== International ===
Year	Team	Event	GP	W	L	T	MIN	GA	SO	GAA
1989	Canada	WJC	6	3	2	0	329	18	0	3.28
1990	Canada	WJC	7	5	1	1	420	18	1	2.57
1994	Canada	WC	2	2	0	0	120	3	0	1.50
Junior int'l totals			13	8	3	1	749	36	1	2.88
Senior int'l totals			2	2	0	0	120	3	0	1.50

== Awards ==
- QMJHL First All-Star Team (1989),
- Canadian Major Junior Goaltender of the Year (1989),
- WJC-A All-Star Team (1990)
- Named Best Goaltender at WJC-A (1990)
- Stanley Cup Champion 1996
