= Marcel Robert Trophy =

The Marcel Robert Trophy is awarded annually to the Scholastic Player of the Year in the Quebec Maritimes Junior Hockey League (QMJHL). The winner is the player who best combines on-ice performance with success in school.

== Winners ==
Season	Player	Team
1980–81	François Lecomte	Montreal Juniors
1981–82	Jacques Sylvestre	Granby Bisons
1982–83	Claude Gosselin	Quebec Remparts
1983–84	Gilbert Paiement	Chicoutimi Saguenéens
1984–85	Claude Gosselin	Quebec Remparts
1985–86	Bernard Morin	Laval Titan
1986–87	Patrice Tremblay	Chicoutimi Saguenéens
1987–88	Stéphane Beauregard	Saint-Jean Castors
1988–89	Daniel Lacroix	Granby Bisons
1989–90	Yanic Perreault	Trois-Rivières Draveurs
1990–91	Benoît Larose	Laval Titan
1991–92	Simon Toupin	Beauport Harfangs
1992–93	Jocelyn Thibault	Sherbrooke Faucons
1993–94	Patrick Boileau	Laval Titan
1994–95	Daniel Brière	Drummondville Voltigeurs
1995–96	Marc Denis	Chicoutimi Saguenéens
1996–97	Luc Vaillancourt	Beauport Harfangs
1997–98	Michel Tremblay	Shawinigan Cataractes
1998–99	Christian Robichaud	Victoriaville Tigres
1999–2000	Yanick Lehoux	Baie-Comeau Drakkar
2000–01	Jean-Philippe Brière	Rimouski Océanic
2001–02	Olivier Michaud	Shawinigan Cataractes
2002–03	Éric L'Italien	Rouyn-Noranda Huskies
2003–04	Nicolas Laplante	Acadie-Bathurst Titan
2004–05	Guillaume Demers	Cape Breton Screaming Eagles
2005–06	Pierre-Marc Guilbault	Shawinigan Cataractes
2006–07	Alexandre Picard-Hooper	Baie-Comeau Drakkar
2007–08	Robert Slaney	Cape Breton Screaming Eagles
2008–09	Payton Liske	Saint John Sea Dogs
2009–10	Dominic Jalbert	Chicoutimi Saguenéens
2010–11	Nicolas Therrien	Chicoutimi Saguenéens
2011–12	Jonathan Brunelle	Cape Breton Screaming Eagles
2012–13	Charles-David Beaudoin	Drummondville Voltigeurs
2013–14	Jérémy Grégoire	Baie-Comeau Drakkar
2014–15	Jérémy Grégoire	Baie-Comeau Drakkar
2015–16	Alexis D'Aoust	Shawinigan Cataractes
2016–17	Antoine Samuel	Baie-Comeau Drakkar
2017–18	Alexandre Alain	Blainville-Boisbriand Armada
2018–19	Matthew Welsh	Charlottetown Islanders
2019–20	Rafaël Harvey-Pinard	Chicoutimi Saguenéens
2020–21	Jacob Gaucher	Val-d'Or Foreurs
2021–22	Charle Truchon	Quebec Remparts
2022–23	Julien Béland	Rimouski Océanic
2023–24	Alexis Morin	Chicoutimi Saguenéens
2024–25	Mathieu Cataford	Rimouski Océanic
2025–26	Nathan Brisson	Val-d'Or Foreurs
