= Paul Brousseau =

Canadian ice hockey player (born 1973)

- Born: September 18, 1973 (age 52) Pierrefonds, Quebec, Canada
- Height: 6 ft 2 in (188 cm)
- Weight: 215 lb (98 kg; 15 st 5 lb)
- Position: Right wing
- Shot: Right
- Played for: Colorado Avalanche; Tampa Bay Lightning; Florida Panthers
- NHL draft: 28th overall, 1992; Quebec Nordiques
- Playing career: 1993–2005

Paul M. Brousseau (born September 18, 1973) is a Canadian former professional ice hockey forward. He played for the Colorado Avalanche, Tampa Bay Lightning, and Florida Panthers in the NHL.

== Playing career ==
Brousseau was selected in the second round of the 1992 NHL entry draft, 28th overall, by the Quebec Nordiques. Paul was selected from the QMJHL where he played for the Chicoutimi Saguenéens, Trois-Rivières Draveurs and the Hull Olympiques.

Brousseau made his professional debut in the 1993–94 season playing with the Nordiques affiliate, the Cornwall Aces of the AHL. Upon the Nordiques relocation Brousseau made his NHL debut with the Colorado Avalanche in their inaugural season in 1995–96, playing in 8 games and scoring his only NHL goal.

On September 10, 1996, Brousseau signed as a free agent with the Tampa Bay Lightning, however spent the majority of the next two seasons with the Lightning's affiliate, the Adirondack Red Wings. Prior to the 1998–99 season, Brousseau was claimed in the expansion draft by the Nashville Predators on June 26, 1998.

Unable to get a game with the Predators, Brousseau left as a free agent and signed with the Florida Panthers on September 20, 1999. By now, a career minor-leaguer, Paul played only one game with the Panthers in the 2000–01 season before leaving for Europe.

Brousseau played in Sweden, Finland, Switzerland, and Germany before returning to North America for one last season for the Verdun Dragons of the LNAH in 2004–05.

== Career statistics ==
			Regular season					Playoffs
Season	Team	League	GP	G	A	Pts	PIM	GP	G	A	Pts	PIM
1988–89	Lac St-Louis Lions	QMAAA	37	6	17	23	28	3	3	1	4	2
1989–90	Chicoutimi Saguenéens	QMJHL	57	17	24	41	32	7	0	3	3	0
1990–91	Trois-Rivières Draveurs	QMJHL	67	30	66	96	48	6	3	2	5	2
1991–92	Hull Olympiques	QMJHL	57	35	61	96	54	6	3	5	8	10
1992–93	Hull Olympiques	QMJHL	59	27	48	75	49	10	7	8	15	6
1993–94	Cornwall Aces	AHL	69	18	26	44	35	1	0	0	0	0
1994–95	Cornwall Aces	AHL	57	19	17	36	29	7	2	1	3	10
1995–96	Cornwall Aces	AHL	63	21	22	43	60	8	4	0	4	2
1995–96	Colorado Avalanche	NHL	8	1	1	2	2	—	—	—	—	—
1996–97	Adirondack Red Wings	AHL	66	35	31	66	25	4	1	2	3	0
1996–97	Tampa Bay Lightning	NHL	6	0	0	0	0	—	—	—	—	—
1997–98	Adirondack Red Wings	AHL	67	45	20	65	18	3	1	1	2	0
1997–98	Tampa Bay Lightning	NHL	11	0	2	2	27	—	—	—	—	—
1998–99	Milwaukee Admirals	IHL	5	1	1	2	2	—	—	—	—	—
1998–99	Hershey Bears	AHL	39	11	21	32	15	5	1	1	2	0
1999–2000	Louisville Panthers	AHL	36	19	24	43	10	4	1	1	2	12
2000–01	Louisville Panthers	AHL	73	29	39	68	21	—	—	—	—	—
2000–01	Florida Panthers	NHL	1	0	0	0	0	—	—	—	—	—
2001–02	AIK	SEL	13	1	3	4	6	—	—	—	—	—
2001–02	SaiPa	SM-l	39	15	11	26	24	—	—	—	—	—
2002–03	SERC Wild Wings	DEL	26	7	9	16	8	—	—	—	—	—
2002–03	HC Fribourg-Gottéron	NLA	7	2	5	7	0	—	—	—	—	—
2003–04	Kassel Huskies	DEL	49	12	12	24	12	—	—	—	—	—
2004–05	Verdun Dragons	LNAH	27	21	21	42	6	—	—	—	—	—
AHL totals			470	197	200	397	213	32	10	6	16	24
NHL totals			26	1	3	4	29	—	—	—	—	—

== Awards and achievements ==
Award	Year
QMJHL
Mike Bossy Trophy	1992
AHL
Willie Marshall Award	1998
Second all-star team	1998
