= 1988–89 QMJHL season =

Canadian junior ice hockey season

The 1988–89 QMJHL season was the 20th season in the history of the Quebec Major Junior Hockey League. The QMJHL first awards the end-of-season honours of the "Rookie All-star team" to first year players.

The Quebec Remparts franchise returned as Longueuil Collège Français, bringing the league up to eleven teams. The league dissolved its divisions, and each team played 70 games each in the schedule. The league made it mandatory for all the teams' players to wear a full face shield covering their entire face.

On February 9, 1989, the Drummondville Voltigeurs' coach and general manager Jean Bégin was suspended indefinitely after he was arrested and charged with sexual assault.

The Trois-Rivières Draveurs finished first overall in the regular season, winning their third Jean Rougeau Trophy. The Laval Titan won their first President's Cup since changing the name from the Laval Voisins, by defeating the Victoriaville Tigres in the finals.

== Team changes ==
- The dormant Quebec Remparts are resurrected as Longueuil Collège Français, playing in Longueuil, Quebec.

== Final standings ==
Note: GP = Games played; W = Wins; L = Losses; T = Ties; Pts = Points; GF = Goals for; GA = Goals against

Overall	GP	W	L	T	Pts	GF	GA
Trois-Rivières Draveurs	70	43	25	2	88	378	314
Laval Titan	70	43	26	1	87	361	292
Hull Olympiques	70	40	25	5	85	329	264
Victoriaville Tigres	70	41	27	2	84	320	267
Drummondville Voltigeurs	70	37	28	5	79	358	303
Saint-Jean Castors	70	33	34	3	69	345	386
Granby Bisons	70	32	35	3	67	286	327
Shawinigan Cataractes	70	31	35	4	66	318	321
Chicoutimi Saguenéens	70	32	37	1	65	335	348
Longueuil Collège Français	70	25	41	4	54	280	332
Verdun Junior Canadiens	70	12	56	2	26	231	387

- complete list of standings.

== Scoring leaders ==
Note: GP = Games played; G = Goals; A = Assists; Pts = Points; PIM = Penalties in Minutes

Player	Team	GP	G	A	Pts	PIM
Stephane Morin	Chicoutimi Saguenéens	70	77	109	186	71
Steve Cadieux	Saint-Jean / Shawinigan	70	80	86	166	22
Donald Audette	Laval Titan	70	76	85	161	123
Steve Chartrand	Drummondville Voltigeurs	70	74	83	157	46
Steve Larouche	Trois-Rivières Draveurs	70	51	102	153	53
J. F. Quintin	Shawinigan Cataractes	69	52	100	152	105
Patrick Lebeau	Shawinigan / Saint-Jean	66	62	87	149	89
Jan Alston	Saint-Jean Castors	69	58	86	144	115
Michel Picard	Trois-Rivières Draveurs	66	59	81	140	107
Patrice Tremblay	Chicoutimi Saguenéens	70	67	70	137	100
Denis Chalifoux	Laval Titan	70	46	91	137	38

- Complete scoring statistics

== Playoffs ==
Yves Racine was the leading scorer of the playoffs with 33 points (3 goals, 30 assists).

Division semifinals

- Shawinigan Cataractes defeated Trois-Rivières Draveurs 4 games to 0.
- Laval Titan defeated Granby Bisons 4 games to 0.
- Hull Olympiques defeated Saint-Jean Castors 4 games to 0.
- Victoriaville Tigres defeated Drummondville Voltigeurs 4 games to 0.

Division Finals

- Laval Titan defeated Shawinigan Cataractes 4 games to 2.
- Victoriaville Tigres defeated Hull Olympiques 4 games to 1.

Finals

- Laval Titan defeated Victoriaville Tigres 4 games to 3.

== All-star teams ==
First team

- Goaltender - Stephane Fiset, Victoriaville Tigres
- Left defence - Yves Racine, Victoriaville Tigres
- Right defence - Eric Dubois, Laval Titan
- Left winger - Steve Chartrand, Drummondville Voltigeurs
- Centreman - Stephane Morin, Chicoutimi Saguenéens
- Right winger - Donald Audette, Laval Titan
- Coach - Dany Dube, Trois-Rivières Draveurs

Second team

- Goaltender - Andre Racicot, Granby Bisons
- Left defence - Steve Veilleux, Trois-Rivières Draveurs
- Right defence - Guy Dupuis, Hull Olympiques
- Left winger - Michel Picard, Trois-Rivières Draveurs
- Centreman - Jeremy Roenick, Hull Olympiques
- Right winger - Ed Courtenay, Granby Bisons & J. F. Quintin, Shawinigan Cataractes
- Coach - Gilbert Perreault, Victoriaville Tigres

Rookie team

- Goaltender - Felix Potvin, Chicoutimi Saguenéens
- Left defence - Karl Dykhuis, Hull Olympiques
- Right defence - Yannick Lemay, Trois-Rivières Draveurs
- Left winger - Pierre Sevigny, Verdun Junior Canadiens
- Centreman - Yanic Perreault, Trois-Rivières Draveurs
- Right winger - Marc Rodgers, Granby Bisons
- Coach - Paulin Bordeleau, Laval Titan
- List of First/Second/Rookie team all-stars.

== Trophies and awards ==
Team

- President's Cup - Playoff Champions, Laval Titan
- Jean Rougeau Trophy - Regular Season Champions, Trois-Rivières Draveurs
- Robert Lebel Trophy - Team with best GAA, Hull Olympiques

Player

- Michel Brière Memorial Trophy - Most Valuable Player, Stephane Morin, Chicoutimi Saguenéens
- Jean Béliveau Trophy - Top Scorer, Stephane Morin, Chicoutimi Saguenéens
- Guy Lafleur Trophy - Playoff MVP, Donald Audette, Laval Titan
- Jacques Plante Memorial Trophy - Best GAA, Stephane Fiset, Victoriaville Tigres
- Emile Bouchard Trophy - Defenceman of the Year, Yves Racine, Victoriaville Tigres
- Mike Bossy Trophy - Best Pro Prospect, Patrice Brisebois, Laval Titan
- Michel Bergeron Trophy - Offensive Rookie of the Year, Yanic Perreault, Trois-Rivières Draveurs
- Raymond Lagacé Trophy - Defensive Rookie of the Year, Karl Dykhuis, Hull Olympiques
- Frank J. Selke Memorial Trophy - Most sportsmanlike player, Steve Cadieux, Shawinigan Cataractes
- Marcel Robert Trophy - Best Scholastic Player, Daniel Lacroix, Granby Bisons

== See also ==
- 1989 Memorial Cup
- 1989 NHL entry draft
- 1988–89 OHL season
- 1988–89 WHL season

Preceded by 1987–88 QMJHL season	QMJHL seasons	Succeeded by 1989–90 QMJHL season
