= Pierre Sévigny =

Pierre Sévigny may refer to:

- Pierre Sévigny (ice hockey) (born 1971), Canadian ice hockey player
- Pierre Sévigny (politician) (1917–2004), Canadian politician
