= Steve Larouche =

Canadian ice hockey player (born 1971)

- Born: April 14, 1971 (age 55) Rouyn-Noranda, Quebec, Canada
- Height: 5 ft 11 in (180 cm)
- Weight: 180 lb (82 kg; 12 st 12 lb)
- Position: Centre
- Shot: Right
- Played for: Ottawa Senators; New York Rangers; Los Angeles Kings
- NHL draft: 41st overall, 1989; Montreal Canadiens
- Playing career: 1991–2011

Steve Larouche (born April 14, 1971) is a Canadian former professional ice hockey player. Larouche played two seasons in the National Hockey League (NHL) split between the Ottawa Senators, New York Rangers, and Los Angeles Kings from 1994–1996.

== Playing career ==
Larouche was drafted 41st overall by the Montreal Canadiens in the 1989 NHL entry draft. He was a standout scorer in junior, playing for the Trois-Rivières Draveurs of the Quebec Major Junior Hockey League, scoring 153 and 145 points in the 1988–89 and 1989–90 seasons, respectively. In 1990–91, now with the Chicoutimi Saguenéens, he led the team to the Memorial Cup by leading the QMJHL in playoff goals, assists, and points.

The next season, Larouche advanced to the American Hockey League to play for the Fredericton Canadiens. However, after two solid seasons with the club, he never got called up to the NHL and he played the 1993–94 season for the Atlanta Knights of the International Hockey League, and continued his scoring success by scoring 96 points in the regular season, and leading the IHL in playoff goals and points in the playoffs as the Knights won the Turner Cup.

Larouche was signed by the Ottawa Senators in the fall of that year, but because of the 1994–95 NHL lockout he found himself back down in the AHL with the P.E.I. Senators. Nevertheless, he led the league in goals with 53 in only 70 games, and finally got a chance with the Senators late in the season. He did not disappoint, scoring eight goals and fifteen points in only eighteen games. However, before the next season started, he was traded to the New York Rangers for Jean-Yves Roy, and then later on to the Los Angeles Kings for Chris Snell. He was back in the minors permanently by the end of the season, and he continued on in the IHL, scoring at a prolific pace until the league disbanded in 2001. After this he went on to play hockey in Germany, Finland and Switzerland.

== Awards ==
- QMJHL Second All-Star Team (1990)
- AHL First All-Star Team (1995)
- Fred T. Hunt Memorial Award for Sportsmanship (1995)
- Awarded Les Cunningham Award as League MVP (1995)
- IHL First All-Star Team (1997, 2000, 2001)
- Won Turner Cup as League Champion (1994, 1998, 2000)

== Achievements ==
- Led QMJHL in playoff goals with 13 (1991)
- Led QMJHL in playoff assists with 20 (1991)
- Led QMJHL in playoff points with 33 (1991)
- Led IHL in playoff goals with 16 (1994)
- Led IHL in playoff points with 26 (1994)
- Led AHL in regular season goals with 53 (1994–95)
- Led IHL in regular season assists with 57 (1999–00)

== Career statistics ==
			Regular season					Playoffs
Season	Team	League	GP	G	A	Pts	PIM	GP	G	A	Pts	PIM
1987–88	Trois-Rivières Draveurs	QMJHL	66	11	29	40	25	—	—	—	—	—
1988–89	Trois-Rivières Draveurs	QMJHL	70	51	102	153	53	4	4	2	6	6
1989–90	Trois-Rivières Draveurs	QMJHL	60	55	90	145	40	7	3	5	8	8
1990–91	Chicoutimi Saguenéens	QMJHL	45	35	41	76	64	17	13	20	33	33
1990–91	Chicoutimi Saguenéens	MC	—	—	—	—	—	4	2	3	5	10
1991–92	Fredericton Canadiens	AHL	74	21	35	56	41	7	1	0	1	0
1992–93	Fredericton Canadiens	AHL	77	27	65	92	52	5	2	5	7	6
1993–94	Atlanta Knights	IHL	80	43	53	96	73	14	16	10	26	16
1994–95	P.E.I. Senators	AHL	70	53	48	101	54	2	1	0	1	0
1994–95	Ottawa Senators	NHL	18	8	7	15	6	—	—	—	—	—
1995–96	New York Rangers	NHL	1	0	0	0	0	—	—	—	—	—
1995–96	Binghamton Rangers	AHL	39	20	46	66	47	—	—	—	—	—
1995–96	Los Angeles Kings	NHL	7	1	2	3	4	—	—	—	—	—
1995–96	Phoenix Roadrunners	IHL	33	19	17	36	14	4	0	1	1	8
1996–97	Québec Rafales	IHL	79	49	53	102	78	9	3	10	13	18
1997–98	Québec Rafales	IHL	68	23	44	67	40	—	—	—	—	—
1997–98	Québec Aces	QSPHL	2	0	0	0	0	—	—	—	—	—
1997–98	Chicago Wolves	IHL	13	9	10	19	20	22	9	11	20	14
1998–99	Chicago Wolves	IHL	33	13	25	38	18	—	—	—	—	—
1999–2000	Chicago Wolves	IHL	82	31	57	88	52	16	6	8	14	22
2000–01	Chicago Wolves	IHL	75	31	52	83	78	15	12	6	18	6
2001–02	Eisbären Berlin	DEL	58	18	29	47	40	4	1	0	1	2
2002–03	Nürnberg Ice Tigers	DEL	20	7	12	19	22	—	—	—	—	—
2003–04	Nürnberg Ice Tigers	DEL	50	10	26	36	52	6	3	1	4	12
2004–05	Lukko	SM-l	56	9	30	39	48	9	2	5	7	12
2005–06	SC Langenthal	NLB	36	22	38	60	62	12	4	12	16	28
2005–06	HC Sierre	NLB	—	—	—	—	—	4	1	1	2	4
2006–07	SC Langenthal	NLB	44	28	51	79	50	6	4	5	9	14
2007–08	SC Langenthal	NLB	49	34	42	76	36	4	0	3	3	14
2008–09	SC Langenthal	NLB	9	3	6	9	4	—	—	—	—	—
2008–09	Pont Rouge Lois Jeans	LNAH	40	23	45	68	10	—	—	—	—	—
2009–10	Pont Rouge Lois Jeans	LNAH	34	13	28	41	14	17	13	14	27	8
2010–11	Trois-Rivières Caron & Guay	LNAH	38	19	33	52	32	5	3	4	7	6
AHL totals			260	121	194	315	194	14	4	5	9	6
IHL totals			416	218	311	529	373	80	46	46	92	84
DEL totals			128	35	67	102	114	10	4	1	5	14
