= Patrice Brisebois =

Canadian ice hockey player (born 1971)

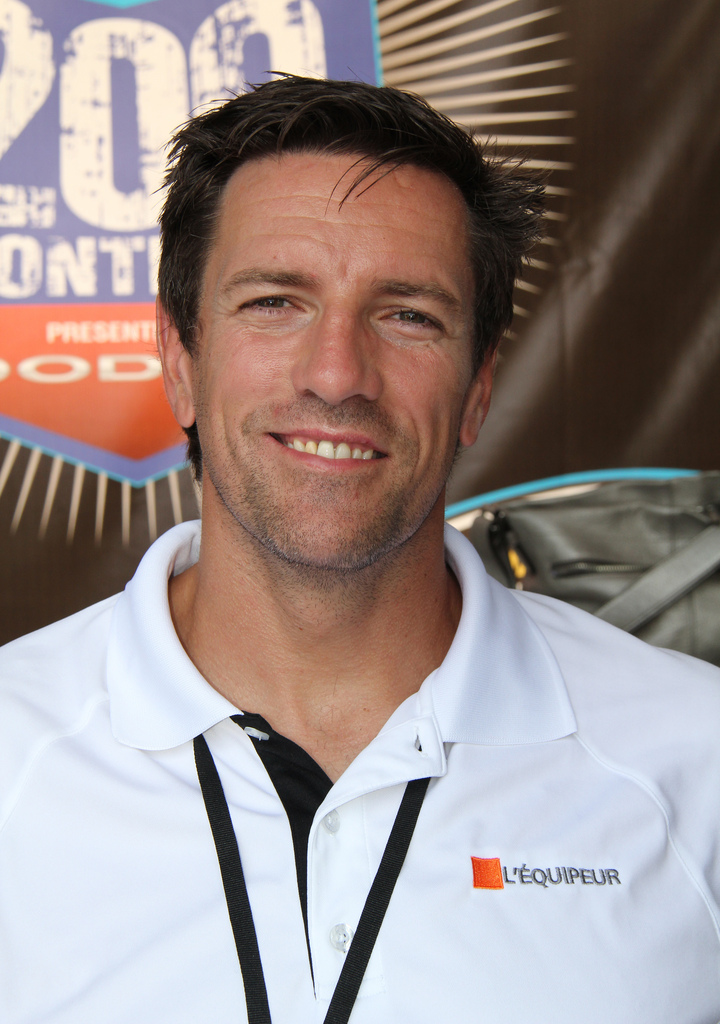
- Brisebois in 2011
- Born: January 27, 1971 (age 55) Montreal, Quebec, Canada
- Height: 6 ft 2 in (188 cm)
- Weight: 209 lb (95 kg; 14 st 13 lb)
- Position: Defence
- Shot: Right
- Played for: Montreal Canadiens; Colorado Avalanche; EHC Kloten
- NHL draft: 30th overall, 1989; Montreal Canadiens
- Playing career: 1991–2009

Joseph Patrice Brisebois (born January 27, 1971) is a Canadian former professional ice hockey defenceman for the Montreal Canadiens and Colorado Avalanche, playing nearly 900 games with the former and 1,009 games overall. Brisebois was recently the Canadiens' Director of Player Development.

== NHL playing career ==
Brisebois was drafted by the Montreal Canadiens in the second round, 30th overall, of the 1989 NHL entry draft. He played junior hockey for the Laval Titan and Drummondville Voltigeurs of the Quebec Major Junior Hockey League (QMJHL), and for the Fredericton Canadiens of the American Hockey League (AHL) during his first year of professional ice hockey. Brisebois's junior career was an unqualified success. In 1990–91, he captured the Emile Bouchard Trophy awarded to the best defencemen in the QMJHL, was named to the QMJHL All-Star team, and took home the award for the Canadian Hockey League (CHL)'s Best Defencemen. He has played for the Canadiens for 14 seasons, winning one Stanley Cup with the franchise during the 1992–93 season.

As a free agent following the NHL lockout in 2004–05, Brisebois left the Canadiens to sign with the Colorado Avalanche in a two-year deal on August 3, 2005. Brisebois then enjoyed a career year statistically, scoring a career-high 38 points with the Avalanche in the 2005–06 season.

On August 3, 2007, Brisebois, again a free agent, returned to the Montreal Canadiens, accepting a one-year incentive-laden deal for the 2007–08 season. At the end of the 2008 season the Habs extended Brisebois to further one-year deal.

Brisebois played his 1000th Career NHL game for the Montreal Canadiens on March 14, 2009 at the Bell Centre against the New Jersey Devils. This feat was eclipsed that night because Martin Brodeur reached Patrick Roy's 551 victories. He was, however, awarded a prize from the vice-president of the NHL as well as a silver stick given to him by Henri Richard.

On September 24, 2009, Brisebois announced his retirement after an 18-year career in the National Hockey League. On the same day, he also received the Jean-Béliveau Trophy awarded annually to a Canadiens player for his contribution in the community. Brisebois ranks third all-time in games played for the Canadiens as a defenceman, lacing up 896 times.

== Racing career ==
Patrice Brisebois

NASCAR Canada Series career
- 14 races run over 7 years
- Best finish: 36th (2009, 2015)
- First race: 2009 GP3R 100 (Trois-Rivières)
- Last race: 2015 JuliaWine.com Le 50 Tours (Trois-Rivières)
Wins	Top tens	Poles
0	0	0

Brisebois was not signed for the 2009–2010 NHL season. He decided to buy a NASCAR Canada car and race in two NASCAR Canada races in August 2009. Brisebois entered the NASCAR Canadian Tire Series' 2009 GP3R 100 at Circuit Trois-Rivières, and pulled out before the end due to heat exhaustion. Brisebois qualified in 15th for the NAPA Autopro 100 at Circuit Gilles Villeneuve, a support race for the NASCAR Nationwide Series' NAPA Auto Parts 200. He finished in 12th place.

== Front office career ==
On June 13, 2012, the Montreal Canadiens announced that Brisebois had joined the organization as Director of Player Development. On July 17, 2014, Brisebois stepped down from his position as Director of Player Development, citing family reasons.

== Career statistics ==
=== Regular season and playoffs ===
			Regular season					Playoffs
Season	Team	League	GP	G	A	Pts	PIM	GP	G	A	Pts	PIM
1986–87	Montreal-Bourassa	QMAAA	39	16	20	36	66	—	—	—	—	—
1987–88	Laval Titan	QMJHL	48	10	34	44	95	6	0	2	2	2
1988–89	Laval Titan	QMJHL	50	20	45	65	95	17	8	14	22	45
1988–89	Laval Titan	MC	—	—	—	—	—	4	2	2	4	6
1989–90	Laval Titan	QMJHL	56	18	70	88	108	13	7	9	18	26
1989–90	Laval Titan	MC	—	—	—	—	—	4	0	4	4	6
1990–91	Drummondville Voltigeurs	QMJHL	54	17	44	61	72	14	6	18	24	49
1990–91	Drummondville Voltigeurs	MC	—	—	—	—	—	5	2	1	3	10
1990–91	Montreal Canadiens	NHL	10	0	2	2	4	—	—	—	—	—
1991–92	Fredericton Canadiens	AHL	53	12	27	39	51	—	—	—	—	—
1991–92	Montreal Canadiens	NHL	26	2	8	10	20	11	2	4	6	6
1992–93	Montreal Canadiens	NHL	70	10	21	31	79	20	0	4	4	18
1993–94	Montreal Canadiens	NHL	53	2	21	23	63	7	0	4	4	6
1994–95	Montreal Canadiens	NHL	35	4	8	12	26	—	—	—	—	—
1995–96	Montreal Canadiens	NHL	69	9	27	36	65	6	1	2	3	6
1996–97	Montreal Canadiens	NHL	49	2	13	15	24	3	1	1	2	24
1997–98	Montreal Canadiens	NHL	79	10	27	37	67	10	1	0	1	0
1998–99	Montreal Canadiens	NHL	54	3	9	12	28	—	—	—	—	—
1999–2000	Montreal Canadiens	NHL	54	10	25	35	18	—	—	—	—	—
2000–01	Montreal Canadiens	NHL	77	15	21	36	28	—	—	—	—	—
2001–02	Montreal Canadiens	NHL	71	4	29	33	25	10	1	1	2	2
2002–03	Montreal Canadiens	NHL	73	4	25	29	32	—	—	—	—	—
2003–04	Montreal Canadiens	NHL	71	4	27	31	22	11	2	1	3	4
2004–05	Kloten Flyers	NLA	10	3	1	4	2	—	—	—	—	—
2005–06	Colorado Avalanche	NHL	80	10	28	38	55	9	0	1	1	4
2006–07	Colorado Avalanche	NHL	33	1	10	11	22	—	—	—	—	—
2007–08	Montreal Canadiens	NHL	43	3	8	11	26	10	1	5	6	6
2008–09	Montreal Canadiens	NHL	62	5	13	18	19	1	0	0	0	0
NHL totals			1,009	98	322	420	623	98	9	23	32	76

=== International ===
Year	Team	Event	Result	GP	G	A	Pts	PIM
1990	Canada	WJC	1st place, gold medalist(s)	7	2	2	4	6
1991	Canada	WJC	1st place, gold medalist(s)	7	1	6	7	2
Junior totals				14	3	8	11	8

== Motorsports career results ==
=== NASCAR ===
(key) (Bold – Pole position awarded by qualifying time. Italics – Pole position earned by points standings or practice time. * – Most laps led.)

=== Canadian Tire Series ===
NASCAR Canadian Tire Series results
Year	Team	No.	Make	1	2	3	4	5	6	7	8	9	10	11	12	13	Rank	Points
2009	Patrice Brisebois	71	Dodge	ASE	DEL	MOS	ASE	MPS	EDM	SAS	MOS	CTR; 17	MTL; 12	BAR	RIS	KWA	36th	239
2010	Patrice Brisebois	71	Chevy	DEL	MOS	ASE	TOR	EDM	MPS	SAS	CTR; 28	MOS					45th	185
2010	Patrice Brisebois	71	Dodge										MTL; 19	BAR	RIS	KWA	45th	185
2011	Patrice Brisebois	71	Chevy	MOS	ICAR; 17	DEL	MOS	TOR	MPS	SAS							38th	288
2011	Patrice Brisebois	71	Dodge								CTR; 22	MTL; 28	BAR	RIS	KWA		38th	288
2012	Patrice Brisebois	71	Dodge	MOS	ICAR	MOS	DEL	MPS	EDM	SAS	CTR; 22	MTL; 17	BAR	RIS	KWA		43rd	49
2013	Patrice Brisebois	71	Dodge	MOS	DEL	MOS2	ICAR	MPS	SAS	ASE	CTR; 12	RIS	MOS3	BAR	KWA		48th	32
2014	Patrice Brisebois	71	Dodge	MOS	ACD	ICAR; 21	EIR	SAS	ASE	CTR; 22	RIS	MOS2	BAR	KWA			40th	45
2015	Patrice Brisebois	71	Dodge	MOS	ACD	SSS	ICAR; 19	EIR	SAS	ASE	CTR; 20	RIS	MOS2	KWA			36th	49

=== Ferrari Challenge – North America ===
==== Trofeo Pirelli AM ====
Ferrari Challenge North America – Trofeo Pirelli AM results
Year	Team	No.	1	2	3	4	5	6	7	8	9	10	11	12	13	14	Rank	Points
2015	Ferrari of Quebec	71	DAY	DAY	HOM	HOM	SON	SON	MTL; 6	MTL; 3	MOS; 8	MOS; 7	CMT	CMT	LGS	LGS	**NA**	**NA**

== See also ==
- List of NHL players with 1,000 games played
