= Philippe Boucher =

Canadian ice hockey player (born 1973)

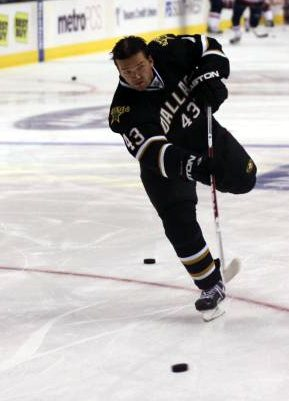
- Born: March 24, 1973 (age 52) Saint-Apollinaire, Quebec, Canada
- Height: 6 ft 3 in (191 cm)
- Weight: 212 lb (96 kg; 15 st 2 lb)
- Position: Defence
- Shot: Right
- Played for: Buffalo Sabres; Los Angeles Kings; Dallas Stars; Pittsburgh Penguins
- NHL draft: 13th overall, 1991; Buffalo Sabres
- Playing career: 1992–2009

Philippe Boucher (born March 24, 1973) is a Canadian former professional ice hockey defenceman who played in the National Hockey League. He was the general manager of the Drummondville Voltigeurs of the QMJHL from 2019 to 2023. He also served as GM with the Quebec Remparts and the Rimouski Oceanic.

== Playing career ==
=== Amateur ===
As a youth, Boucher played in the 1985, 1986 and 1987 Quebec International Pee-Wee Hockey Tournaments with minor ice hockey team from Lotbinière, Quebec and Rive-Sud. Boucher began his junior ice hockey career with the Quebec Major Junior Hockey League's Granby Bisons in 1990. Boucher produced at a nearly point-per-game average and won the QMJHL Rookie of the Year award. He was also named a second-team QMJHL All-Star. In his second season, Boucher notched 77 points in 65 games with Granby and the Laval Titan, again being named a second-team All-Star. Boucher spent one more seasons in the QMJHL, splitting time between Granby, Laval, and later two professional teams.

=== Professional ===
The Buffalo Sabres drafted Boucher in the first round, 13th overall, in the 1991 NHL entry draft. One year later, Boucher began his professional career, starting the 1992–1993 season as a defenceman for the Sabres. Boucher posted a +5 plus/minus rating, but ended the season with the Rochester Americans of the American Hockey League. Boucher was dealt to the Los Angeles Kings during the 1994–1995 season. In Los Angeles, he played a career-high 80 games in the 2001–2002 season.

Boucher with the Pittsburgh Penguins in 2008

In 2002, Boucher signed as a free agent with the Dallas Stars, reuniting with the former special teams coach of the Kings, Dave Tippett. On November 28, 2003, late in the third period of a game against the New Jersey Devils, an errant puck hit Boucher on the left side of his face, breaking his left orbital bone. Boucher had surgery on December 1 to repair the bone, putting him on the injured list for weeks. After the injury, Boucher wore a visor.

In the 2006–07 NHL season, Boucher tied the Stars' franchise record for most goals by a defenceman in a regular season, with 19 goals. Boucher was selected by the NHL to play in the 55th National Hockey League All-Star Game in Dallas on January 24, 2007. Since Scott Niedermayer, one of two defencemen on the starting line-up chosen by the fans, was injured at the time, Western All-Star coach Barry Trotz named Boucher on the starting line-up as Niedermayer's replacement. During the 2008–09 season on November 16, 2008, Boucher was traded by the Stars to the Pittsburgh Penguins in return for Darryl Sydor. He helped the Penguins capture the Stanley Cup, his first, before announcing his retirement from the NHL on September 3, 2009.

== Personal life ==
Boucher resides with his wife Lucie and their two children, Matthew and Vanessa in Quebec City during the summer. Boucher founded the Philippe-Boucher Foundation, which helps underprivileged children in the Lotbinière region.

== Awards ==
- RDS Cup (QMJHL Rookie of the Year) – 1990–91
- OMJHL Second-Team All-Star – 1990–91 and 1991–92
- Played in NHL All-Star Game – 2007
- Stanley Cup champion – 2009

== Career statistics ==
			Regular season					Playoffs
Season	Team	League	GP	G	A	Pts	PIM	GP	G	A	Pts	PIM
1988–89	Ste-Foy Gouverneurs	QMAAA	5	0	0	0	2	—	—	—	—	—
1989–90	Ste-Foy Gouverneurs	QMAAA	42	26	60	86	76	12	6	19	25	16
1990–91	Granby Bisons	QMJHL	69	21	46	67	92	—	—	—	—	—
1991–92	Granby Bisons	QMJHL	49	22	37	59	47	—	—	—	—	—
1991–92	Laval Titan	QMJHL	16	7	11	18	36	10	5	6	11	8
1992–93	Laval Titan	QMJHL	16	12	15	27	37	13	6	15	21	12
1992–93	Rochester Americans	AHL	5	4	3	7	8	3	0	1	1	2
1992–93	Buffalo Sabres	NHL	18	0	4	4	14	—	—	—	—	—
1993–94	Rochester Americans	AHL	31	10	22	32	51	—	—	—	—	—
1993–94	Buffalo Sabres	NHL	38	6	8	14	29	7	1	1	2	2
1994–95	Rochester Americans	AHL	43	14	27	41	26	—	—	—	—	—
1994–95	Buffalo Sabres	NHL	9	1	4	5	0	—	—	—	—	—
1994–95	Los Angeles Kings	NHL	6	1	0	1	4	—	—	—	—	—
1995–96	Phoenix Roadrunners	IHL	10	4	3	7	4	—	—	—	—	—
1995–96	Los Angeles Kings	NHL	53	7	16	23	31	—	—	—	—	—
1996–97	Los Angeles Kings	NHL	60	7	18	25	25	—	—	—	—	—
1997–98	Long Beach Ice Dogs	IHL	2	0	1	1	4	—	—	—	—	—
1997–98	Los Angeles Kings	NHL	45	6	10	16	49	—	—	—	—	—
1998–99	Los Angeles Kings	NHL	45	2	6	8	32	—	—	—	—	—
1999–2000	Long Beach Ice Dogs	IHL	14	4	11	15	8	6	0	9	9	8
1999–2000	Los Angeles Kings	NHL	1	0	0	0	0	—	—	—	—	—
2000–01	Manitoba Moose	IHL	45	10	22	32	39	—	—	—	—	—
2000–01	Los Angeles Kings	NHL	22	2	4	6	20	13	0	1	1	2
2001–02	Los Angeles Kings	NHL	80	7	23	30	94	5	0	1	1	2
2002–03	Dallas Stars	NHL	80	7	20	27	94	11	1	2	3	11
2003–04	Dallas Stars	NHL	70	8	16	24	64	5	1	0	1	6
2005–06	Dallas Stars	NHL	66	16	27	43	77	5	0	1	1	2
2006–07	Dallas Stars	NHL	76	19	32	51	104	7	0	1	1	6
2007–08	Dallas Stars	NHL	38	2	12	14	26	3	0	0	0	4
2008–09	Dallas Stars	NHL	16	0	3	3	15	—	—	—	—	—
2008–09	Pittsburgh Penguins	NHL	25	3	3	6	24	9	1	3	4	4
NHL totals			748	94	206	300	702	65	4	10	14	39

Preceded by Brad May	Buffalo Sabres first-round draft pick 1991	Succeeded by David Cooper
