= Patrick Lebeau =

Canadian ice hockey player

- Born: March 17, 1970 (age 56) Saint-Jérôme, Quebec, Canada
- Height: 5 ft 10 in (178 cm)
- Weight: 187 lb (85 kg; 13 st 5 lb)
- Position: Left wing
- Shot: Left
- Played for: Montreal Canadiens; Calgary Flames; Florida Panthers; Pittsburgh Penguins; Frankfurt Lions
- National team: Canada
- NHL draft: 167th overall, 1989; Montreal Canadiens
- Playing career: 1990–2011
Medal record
Men's ice hockey
Representing Canada
Winter Olympics
Silver medal – second place	1992 Albertville	Ice hockey

Patrick Mikael Lebeau (born March 17, 1970) is a Canadian former professional ice hockey player. He represented Canada at the 1992 Winter Olympics, winning a silver medal. He has played professionally in the National Hockey League with the Montreal Canadiens, Calgary Flames, Florida Panthers, and Pittsburgh Penguins. He is the younger brother of Stéphan Lebeau.

== Career ==
Lebeau was born in Saint-Jérôme, Quebec. As a youth, he played in the 1983 Quebec International Pee-Wee Hockey Tournament with the Sherbrook Castors minor ice hockey team. He played junior ice hockey from 1986 to 1990 for the Shawinigan Cataractes, the Saint-Jean Castors, and the Victoriaville Tigres. Lebeau joined the Montreal Canadiens in 1990 and played most of the season for their affiliate Fredericton Canadiens.

Lebeau joined the now-defunct Frankfurt Lions for the 2002–03 DEL season and, along with his linemates Jesse Bélanger and Dwayne Norris, was instrumental in the Lions' surprise 2004 DEL championship; he led the DEL in scoring in 2003–04 and 2004–05. Due to injuries during the following two DEL campaigns he missed a lot of games and left Frankfurt after the 2006–07 season, opting to try out for an NHL club; he eventually received an offer from the Philadelphia Flyers but didn't pass his physical.

In 2008, Lebeau had a tryout with the Füchse Duisburg, but was unsuccessful in gaining a contract with the team and moved to the Vienna Capitals in Austria instead.

== Career statistics ==
=== Regular season and playoffs ===
			Regular season					Playoffs
Season	Team	League	GP	G	A	Pts	PIM	GP	G	A	Pts	PIM
1984–85	Cantons de L'Est Cantonniers	QMAAA	38	16	27	43	24	—	—	—	—	—
1985–86	Cantons de L'Est Cantonniers	QMAAA	42	43	47	90	—	—	—	—	—	—
1986–87	Shawinigan Cataractes	QMJHL	66	26	52	78	90	13	2	6	8	17
1987–88	Shawinigan Cataractes	QMJHL	53	43	56	99	116	11	3	9	12	16
1988–89	Shawinigan Cataractes	QMJHL	17	19	17	36	18	—	—	—	—	—
1988–89	Saint–Jean Castors	QMJHL	49	43	70	113	71	4	4	3	7	6
1989–90	Saint–Jean Lynx	QMJHL	57	53	85	138	76	—	—	—	—	—
1989–90	Victoriaville Tigres	QMJHL	15	15	21	36	33	16	7	15	22	12
1990–91	Montreal Canadiens	NHL	2	1	1	2	0	—	—	—	—	—
1990–91	Fredericton Canadiens	AHL	69	50	51	101	32	9	4	7	11	8
1991–92	Canadian National Team	Intl	7	4	2	6	6	—	—	—	—	—
1991–92	Fredericton Canadiens	AHL	55	33	38	71	48	7	4	5	9	10
1992–93	Calgary Flames	NHL	1	0	0	0	0	—	—	—	—	—
1992–93	Salt Lake Golden Eagles	IHL	75	40	60	100	65	—	—	—	—	—
1993–94	Cincinnati Cyclones	IHL	74	47	42	89	90	11	4	8	12	14
1993–94	Florida Panthers	NHL	4	1	1	2	4	—	—	—	—	—
1994–95	ZSC Lions	NDA	36	27	25	52	22	5	4	6	10	6
1995–96	ZSC Lions	NDA	11	6	8	14	0	—	—	—	—	—
1995–96	Düsseldorfer EG	DEL	17	13	8	21	18	13	11	7	18	14
1996–97	ZSC Lions	NDA	38	27	19	46	26	4	1	0	1	25
1997–98	HC La Chaux–de–Fonds	NDA	40	17	45	62	32	—	—	—	—	—
1998–99	Pittsburgh Penguins	NHL	8	1	0	1	2	—	—	—	—	—
1999–00	HC Ambrì–Piotta	NLA	44	25	38	63	32	9	5	5	10	8
2000–01	ZSC Lions	NLA	22	9	10	19	31	13	4	4	8	4
2001–02	HC La Chaux–de–Fonds	SUI.2	5	3	15	18	2	5	3	5	8	8
2002–03	Frankfurt Lions	DEL	31	22	15	37	10	—	—	—	—	—
2003–04	Frankfurt Lions	DEL	51	23	46	69	46	15	8	6	14	8
2004–05	Frankfurt Lions	DEL	52	29	65	94	44	11	4	5	9	4
2005–06	Frankfurt Lions	DEL	39	13	33	46	47	—	—	—	—	—
2006–07	Frankfurt Lions	DEL	33	11	24	35	36	5	1	2	3	10
2008–09	Vienna Capitals	AUT	52	30	52	82	54	5	2	3	5	0
2009–10	Vienna Capitals	AUT	37	14	36	50	18	12	5	17	22	8
2010–11	Sherbrooke St. Francois	LNAH	2	0	3	3	0	—	—	—	—	—
NDA/NLA totals			191	111	145	256	143	31	14	15	29	43
DEL totals			225	110	191	301	201	44	24	20	44	36
NHL totals			15	3	2	5	6	—	—	—	—	—

=== International ===
Year	Team	Event	Result	GP	G	A	Pts	PIM
1992	Canada	OG	2nd place, silver medalist(s)	8	1	3	4	4
Senior totals				8	1	3	4	4

== Awards ==
- 1990–91 - Dudley "Red" Garrett Memorial Award
