= John Horman Trophy =

Annual award in Quebec Maritimes Junior Hockey League

- Description: Annual award recognizing the executive/administrator of the year
- Country: Canada
- Presented by: Quebec Maritimes Junior Hockey League

The John Horman Trophy is awarded annually to the Executive of the Year in the Quebec Maritimes Junior Hockey League.

== Winners ==
Season	Executive	Team
1989–90	Michel Larocque	Victoriaville Tigres
1990–91	Rolland Janelle	Drummondville Voltigeurs
1991–92	Claude Lemieux	Saint-Hyacinthe Laser
1992–93	Georges Marien	Saint-Jean Lynx
1993–94	Jean-Claude Morrissette	Laval Titan
1994–95	Jean Nadeau	Shawinigan Cataractes
1995–96	Andre Jolicoeur	Rimouski Océanic
1996–97	Harold MacKay	Halifax Mooseheads
1997–98	Lionel Brochu	Val-d'Or Foreurs
1998–99	Charles Henry	Hull Olympiques
1999–2000	Maurice Tanguay	Rimouski Océanic
2000–01	Mario Boucher	Shawinigan Cataractes
2001–02	Chicoutimi Saguenéens	
2002–03	Sylvie Fortier	Baie-Comeau Drakkar
2003–04	Sylvie Fortier	Baie-Comeau Drakkar
2004–05	Eric Verrier	Drummondville Voltigeurs
2005–06	Eric Verrier	Drummondville Voltigeurs
2006–07	Pierre Dufour	Val-d'Or Foreurs
2007–08	Mario Arsenault	Rimouski Océanic
2008–09	Louis Painchaud	Quebec Remparts
2009–10	Kent Hudson	P.E.I. Rocket
2010–11	Wayne Long	Saint John Sea Dogs
2011–12	Paul MacDonald	Cape Breton Screaming Eagles
2012–13	Serge Proulx	Baie-Comeau Drakkar
2013–14	Serge Proulx	Baie-Comeau Drakkar
2014–15	Jonathan Doiron	Charlottetown Islanders
2015–16	Louis Painchaud	Quebec Remparts
2016–17	Serge Proulx	Chicoutimi Saguenéens
2017–18	Éric Boucher	Rimouski Océanic
2018–19	Étienne Fortier	Baie-Comeau Drakkar
2019–20	David Boies	Drummondville Voltigeurs
2020–21	John Horman Trophy not awarded	
2021–22	John Horman Trophy not awarded	
2022–23	Martin Paquet	Victoriaville Tigres
2023–24	Jean-Philippe Bérubé	Rimouski Océanic
2024–25	Joey Haddad	Cape Breton Eagles
2025–26	Glenn Stanford, & Ken O'Leary	Newfoundland Regiment
