= 1991–92 QMJHL season =

Canadian junior ice hockey season

The 1991–92 QMJHL season was the 23rd season in the history of the Quebec Major Junior Hockey League. The league inaugurates the Molson Cup, awarded to the overall "Rookie of the Year," in addition to the existing Michel Bergeron Trophy and Raymond Lagacé Trophy.

The top three scorers in the league, are all linemates from the Saint-Hyacinthe Laser. Centreman Charles Poulin won the QMJHL's Most Valuable Player and CHL Player of the Year. Completing the line were; left winger Patrick Poulin, the league's scoring champion; and right winger Martin Gendron, the league's Most sportsmanlike player and Offensive Player of the Year. The league went back to the players wearing a half visor.

Twelve teams played 70 games each in the schedule. Verdun Collège Français finished first overall in the regular season, winning their first Jean Rougeau Trophy, and won its first President's Cup, defeating the Trois-Rivières Draveurs in the finals.

== Team changes ==
- Longueuil Collège Français relocated to Verdun, Quebec, becoming Verdun Collège Français.

== Final standings ==
Note: GP = Games played; W = Wins; L = Losses; T = Ties; PTS = Points; GF = Goals for; GA = Goals against

Dilio Division	GP	W	L	T	Pts	GF	GA
Trois-Rivières Draveurs	70	45	21	4	94	333	221
Shawinigan Cataractes	70	37	27	6	80	279	273
Chicoutimi Saguenéens	70	31	33	6	68	279	304
Drummondville Voltigeurs	70	28	39	3	59	285	319
Beauport Harfangs	70	25	40	5	55	257	298
Victoriaville Tigres	70	16	52	2	34	243	388

Lebel Division	GP	W	L	T	Pts	GF	GA
Verdun Collège Français	70	48	17	5	101	350	233
Hull Olympiques	70	41	24	5	87	331	259
Laval Titan	70	38	27	5	81	306	276
Saint-Hyacinthe Laser	70	35	28	7	77	332	274
Granby Bisons	70	25	42	3	53	291	355
Saint-Jean Lynx	70	24	43	3	51	250	336

- complete list of standings.

== Scoring leaders ==
Note: GP = Games played; G = Goals; A = Assists; Pts = Points; PIM = Penalties in minutes

Player	Team	GP	G	A	Pts	PIM
Patrick Poulin	Saint-Hyacinthe Laser	56	52	86	138	58
Martin Gendron	Saint-Hyacinthe Laser	69	71	66	137	45
Charles Poulin	Saint-Hyacinthe Laser	68	38	97	135	113
Hughes Mongeon	Granby / Laval	62	53	77	130	35
Hugo Proulx	Drummondville Voltigeurs	66	45	79	124	82
Marc Rodgers	Granby / Verdun	65	44	76	120	109
Robert Guillet	Verdun Collège Français	67	56	62	118	104
Carl Boudreau	Trois-Rivières Draveurs	69	47	68	115	71
Alexandre Daigle	Victoriaville Tigres	66	35	75	110	63
Éric Bellerose	Hull / Trois-Rivières	70	44	65	109	133

- complete scoring statistics

== Playoffs ==
Robert Guillet was the leading scorer of the playoffs with 25 points (14 goals, 11 assists).

Division semifinals

- Verdun Collège Français defeated Saint-Hyacinthe Laser 4 games to 2.
- Laval Titan defeated Hull Olympiques 4 games to 2.
- Trois-Rivières Draveurs defeated Drummondville Voltigeurs 4 games to 0.
- Shawinigan Cataractes defeated Chicoutimi Saguenéens 4 games to 0.

Division finals

- Verdun Collège Français defeated Shawinigan Cataractes 4 games to 2.
- Trois-Rivières Draveurs defeated Laval Titan 4 games to 0.

Finals

- Verdun Collège Français defeated Trois-Rivières Draveurs 4 games to 3.

== All-star teams ==
First team

- Goaltender - Jean-Francois Labbe, Trois-Rivières Draveurs
- Left defence - Francois Groleau, Shawinigan Cataractes
- Right defence - Yan Arsenault, Verdun Collège Français
- Left winger - Patrick Poulin, Saint-Hyacinthe Laser
- Centreman - Charles Poulin, Saint-Hyacinthe Laser
- Right winger - Martin Gendron, Saint-Hyacinthe Laser
- Coach - Alain Sanscartier, Shawinigan Cataractes

Second team

- Goaltender - Martin Brodeur, Saint-Hyacinthe Laser
- Left defence - Benoit Larose, Laval Titan
- Right defence - Philippe Boucher, Laval Titan
- Left winger - Yves Sarault, Trois-Rivières Draveurs
- Centreman - Alexandre Daigle, Victoriaville Tigres
- Right winger - Robert Guillet, Verdun Collège Français
- Coach - Alain Vigneault, Hull Olympiques

Rookie team

- Goaltender - Jocelyn Thibault, Trois-Rivières Draveurs
- Left defence - Simon Roy, Shawinigan Cataractes
- Right defence - Michael Gaul, Laval Titan
- Left winger - Ian McIntyre, Beauport Harfangs
- Centreman - Sebastien Bordeleau, Hull Olympiques
- Right winger - Samuel Groleau, Saint-Jean Lynx
- Coach - Bob Hartley, Laval Titan
- List of First/Second/Rookie team all-stars.

== Trophies and awards ==
Team

- President's Cup - Playoff Champions, Verdun Collège Français
- Jean Rougeau Trophy - Regular Season Champions, Verdun Collège Français
- Robert Lebel Trophy - Team with best GAA, Trois-Rivières Draveurs

Player

- Michel Brière Memorial Trophy - Most Valuable Player, Charles Poulin, Saint-Hyacinthe Laser
- Jean Béliveau Trophy - Top Scorer, Patrick Poulin, Saint-Hyacinthe Lasers
- Guy Lafleur Trophy - Playoff MVP, Robert Guillet, Verdun Collège Français
- Shell Cup – Offensive - Offensive Player of the Year, Martin Gendron, Saint-Hyacinthe Laser
- Shell Cup – Defensive - Defensive Player of the Year, Jean-Francois Labbe, Trois-Rivières Draveurs
- Transamerica Plaque - Best plus/minus total, Carl Boudreau, Trois-Rivières Draveurs
- Jacques Plante Memorial Trophy - Best GAA, Jean-Francois Labbe, Trois-Rivières Draveurs
- Emile Bouchard Trophy - Defenceman of the Year, Francois Groleau, Shawinigan Cataractes
- Mike Bossy Trophy - Best Pro Prospect, Paul Brousseau, Hull Olympiques
- Molson Cup - Rookie of the Year, Alexandre Daigle, Victoriaville Tigres
- Michel Bergeron Trophy - Offensive Rookie of the Year, Alexandre Daigle, Victoriaville Tigres
- Raymond Lagacé Trophy - Defensive Rookie of the Year, Philippe DeRouville, Verdun Collège Français
- Frank J. Selke Memorial Trophy - Most sportsmanlike player, Martin Gendron, Saint-Hyacinthe Laser
- Marcel Robert Trophy - Best Scholastic Player, Simon Toupin, Beauport Harfangs
- Paul Dumont Trophy - Personality of the Year, Patrick Poulin, Saint-Hyacinthe Laser

Executive

- John Horman Trophy - Executive of the Year, Claude Lemieux, Saint-Hyacinthe Laser
- St-Clair Group Plaque - Marketing Director of the Year, Michel Boisvert, Shawinigan Cataractes

== See also ==
- 1992 Memorial Cup
- 1992 NHL entry draft
- 1991–92 OHL season
- 1991–92 WHL season

Preceded by 1990–91 QMJHL season	QMJHL seasons	Succeeded by 1992–93 QMJHL season
