= 1990–91 QMJHL season =

Canadian junior ice hockey season

The 1990–91 QMJHL season was the 22nd season in the history of the Quebec Major Junior Hockey League. The league inaugurated the St-Clair Group Plaque, awarded to the "Marketing Director of the Year." Dilio and Lebel divisions are restored as the league adds an expansion franchise in Beauport, Quebec, a suburb of the provincial capital. Twelve teams played 70 games each in the schedule.

The Chicoutimi Saguenéens finished first overall in the regular season, winning their first Jean Rougeau Trophy, backstopped by Goaltender of the Year and Playoff MVP, Felix Potvin. Chicoutimi won its first President's Cup, defeating the Drummondville Voltigeurs in four games.

== Team changes ==
- The Beauport Harfangs join the league as an expansion franchise.

== Final standings ==
Note: GP = Games played; W = Wins; L = Losses; T = Ties; Pts = Points; GF = Goals for; GA = Goals against

Dilio Division	GP	W	L	T	Pts	GF	GA
Chicoutimi Saguenéens	70	43	21	6	92	299	223
Trois-Rivières Draveurs	70	44	25	1	89	360	246
Drummondville Voltigeurs	70	42	25	3	87	232	216
Shawinigan Cataractes	70	27	40	3	57	261	289
Beauport Harfangs	70	26	40	4	56	233	297
Victoriaville Tigres	70	10	59	1	21	209	436

Lebel Division	GP	W	L	T	Pts	GF	GA
Longueuil Collège Français	70	41	27	2	84	303	225
Hull Olympiques	70	36	27	7	79	263	235
Laval Titan	70	37	30	3	77	273	242
Saint-Hyacinthe Laser	70	36	30	4	76	287	251
Granby Bisons	70	34	30	6	74	227	231
Saint-Jean Lynx	70	21	43	6	48	205	289

- complete list of standings.

== Scoring leaders ==
Note: GP = Games played; G = Goals; A = Assists; Pts = Points; PIM = Penalties in Minutes

Player	Team	GP	G	A	Pts	PIM
Yanic Perreault	Trois-Rivières Draveurs	67	87	98	185	103
Todd Gillingham	Trois-Rivières Draveurs	66	46	102	148	353
Denis Chalifoux	Laval Titan	67	38	79	117	77
Carl Boudreau	Laval/Victoriaville/Trois-Rivières	70	36	69	105	124
Denis Chasse	Drummondville Voltigeurs	62	47	54	101	246
Martin Lapointe	Laval Titan	64	44	54	98	66
Sylvain Fleury	Longueuil Collège Français	68	36	61	97	29
Eric Cool	Beauport Harfangs	61	32	64	96	42
Paul Brousseau	Trois-Rivières Draveurs	67	30	66	96	48
Martin Lefebvre	Saint-Jean Lynx	70	39	56	95	122
Bruno Villeneuve	Hull Olympiques	70	42	53	95	68

- complete scoring statistics

== Playoffs ==
Steve Larouche was the leading scorer of the playoffs with 33 points (13 goals, 20 assists).

Conference Semifinals
D1	Chicoutimi	4
D4	Shawinigan	2
L2	Hull	2
L3	Laval	4
D2	Trois-Rivières	2
D3	Drummondville	4
L1	Longueuil	4
L4	Saint-Hyacinthe	0

Conference Finals
1	Chicoutimi	4
6	Laval	3
3	Drummondville	4
4	Longueuil	0

President's Cup Final
1	Chicoutimi	4
3	Drummondville	0

== All-star teams ==
First team

- Goaltender - Felix Potvin, Chicoutimi Saguenéens
- Left defence - Eric Brule, Chicoutimi Saguenéens
- Right defence - Patrice Brisebois, Drummondville Voltigeurs
- Left winger - Todd Gillingham, Trois-Rivières Draveurs
- Centreman - Yanic Perreault, Trois-Rivières Draveurs
- Right winger - Robert Guillet, Longueuil Collège Français
- Coach - Jos Canale, Chicoutimi Saguenéens

Second team

- Goaltender - Boris Rousson, Granby Bisons
- Left defence - Guy Lehoux, Drummondville Voltigeurs
- Right defence - Philippe Boucher, Granby Bisons
- Left winger - Pierre Sevigny, Saint-Hyacinthe Laser
- Centreman - Denis Chalifoux, Laval Titan
- Right winger - Martin Lapointe, Laval Titan
- Coach - Alain Vigneault, Hull Olympiques

Rookie team

- Goaltender - Marcel Cousineau, Beauport Harfangs
- Left defence - Martin Lapage, Hull Olympiques
- Right defence - Dean Melanson, Saint-Hyacinthe Laser
- Left winger - Rene Corbet, Drummondville Voltigeurs
- Centreman - Pierre-Francois Lalonde, Hull Olympiques
- Right winger - Martin Gendron, Saint-Hyacinthe Laser
- Coach - Jean Hamel, Drummondville Voltigeurs
- List of First/Second/Rookie team all-stars.

== Trophies and awards ==
Team

- President's Cup - Playoff Champions, Chicoutimi Saguenéens
- Jean Rougeau Trophy - Regular Season Champions, Chicoutimi Saguenéens
- Robert Lebel Trophy - Team with best GAA, Chicoutimi Saguenéens

Player

- Michel Brière Memorial Trophy - Most Valuable Player, Yanic Perreault, Trois-Rivières Draveurs
- Jean Béliveau Trophy - Top Scorer, Yanic Perreault, Trois-Rivières Draveurs
- Guy Lafleur Trophy - Playoff MVP, Felix Potvin, Chicoutimi Saguenéens
- Shell Cup – Offensive - Offensive Player of the Year, Yanic Perreault, Trois-Rivières Draveurs
- Shell Cup – Defensive - Defensive Player of the Year, Felix Potvin, Chicoutimi Saguenéens
- Transamerica Plaque - Best plus/minus total, Christian Larivière, Saint-Hyacinthe Laser
- Jacques Plante Memorial Trophy - Best GAA, Felix Potvin, Chicoutimi Saguenéens
- Emile Bouchard Trophy - Defenceman of the Year, Patrice Brisebois, Drummondville Voltigeurs
- Mike Bossy Trophy - Best Pro Prospect, Philippe Boucher, Granby Bisons
- Michel Bergeron Trophy - Offensive Rookie of the Year, Rene Corbet, Drummondville Voltigeurs
- Raymond Lagacé Trophy - Defensive Rookie of the Year, Philippe Boucher, Granby Bisons
- Frank J. Selke Memorial Trophy - Most sportsmanlike player, Yanic Perreault, Trois-Rivières Draveurs
- Marcel Robert Trophy - Best Scholastic Player, Benoit Larose, Laval Titan
- Paul Dumont Trophy - Personality of the Year, Patrice Brisebois, Drummondville Voltigeurs

Executive

- John Horman Trophy - Executive of the Year, Rolland Janelle, Drummondville Voltigeurs
- St-Clair Group Plaque - Marketing Director of the Year, Gilles Cote, Hull Olympiques

== See also ==
- 1991 Memorial Cup
- 1991 NHL entry draft
- 1990–91 OHL season
- 1990–91 WHL season

Preceded by 1989–90 QMJHL season	QMJHL seasons	Succeeded by 1991–92 QMJHL season
