= List of Quebec Maritimes Junior Hockey League seasons =

This is a list of Quebec Maritimes Junior Hockey League seasons since inception of the league.

- 1969–70
- 1970–71
- 1971–72
- 1972–73
- 1973–74
- 1974–75
- 1975–76
- 1976–77
- 1977–78
- 1978–79
- 1979–80
- 1980–81
- 1981–82
- 1982–83
- 1983–84
- 1984–85
- 1985–86
- 1986–87
- 1987–88
- 1988–89
- 1989–90
- 1990–91
- 1991–92
- 1992–93
- 1993–94
- 1994–95
- 1995–96
- 1996–97
- 1997–98
- 1998–99
- 1999–2000
- 2000–01
- 2001–02
- 2002–03
- 2003–04
- 2004–05
- 2005–06
- 2006–07
- 2007–08
- 2008–09
- 2009–10
- 2010–11
- 2011–12
- 2012–13
- 2013–14
- 2014–15
- 2015–16
- 2016–17
- 2017–18
- 2018–19
- 2019–20
- 2020–21
- 2021–22
- 2022–23
- 2023–24
- 2024–25
- 2025–26
- 2026–27

== See also ==
- List of OHL seasons
- List of WHL seasons
