= AutoPro Plaque =

- Description: Awarded annually to the player with the best plus/minus total in the Quebec Major Junior Hockey League
- Country: Canada
- Presented by: Quebec Maritimes Junior Hockey League
- Status: Discontinued

The AutoPro Plaque was awarded annually to the player with the best plus/minus total in the Quebec Major Junior Hockey League. The award was initiated in 1989–90, then known as the Transamerica Plaque, and discontinued in 2001–02.

== Winners ==
| Season | Player | Team | Total |
Transamerica Plaque
| 1989–90 | Martin St. Amour | Trois-Rivières Draveurs | +64 |
| 1990–91 | Christian Lariviere | Saint-Hyacinthe Laser | +50 |
| 1991–92 | Carl Boudreau | Trois-Rivières Draveurs | +49 |
| 1992–93 | Claude Savoie | Victoriaville Tigres | +47 |
| 1993–94 | Michel St. Jacques | Chicoutimi Saguenéens | +64 |
AutoPro Plaque
| 1994–95 | Frederic Chartier | Laval Titan Collège Français | +54 |
| 1995–96 | Daniel Goneau | Granby Prédateurs | +82 |
| 1996–97 | Pavel Rosa | Hull Olympiques | +59 |
| 1997–98 | David Thibeault | Victoriaville Tigres | +53 |
| 1998–99 | Simon Tremblay | Québec Remparts | +71 |
| 1999–2000 | Brad Richards | Rimouski Océanic | +80 |
| 2000–01 | Simon Gamache | Val-d'Or Foreurs | +64 |
| 2001–02 | Jonathan Bellemare | Shawinigan Cataractes | +43 |
