= 1989–90 QMJHL season =

Canadian junior ice hockey season

The 1989–90 QMJHL season was the 21st season in the history of the Quebec Major Junior Hockey League. The league inaugurates five new awards for accomplishments during the season. Shell Canada sponsored two Shell Cup "Player of the Year" awards, one each for offensive and defensive players. Transamerica sponsors the Transamerica Plaque for the player with the best plus/minus totals. The creates its first award specifically for team builders, the John Horman Trophy for the "Executive of the Year." Finally, the Paul Dumont Trophy is awarded to anyone involved with the league, as the "Personality of the Year."

Eleven teams played 70 games each in the schedule. The Victoriaville Tigres finished first overall in the regular season, winning their first Jean Rougeau Trophy. The President's Cup final was a rematch of the previous season, with the Laval Titan, winning a second consecutive title, defeating Victoriaville in four games.

== Team changes ==
- The Saint-Jean Castors are renamed the Saint-Jean Lynx.
- The Verdun Junior Canadiens relocate to Saint-Hyacinthe, Quebec, becoming the Saint-Hyacinthe Laser.

== Final standings ==
Note: GP = Games played; W = Wins; L = Losses; T = Ties; PTS = Points; GF = Goals for; GA = Goals against

Overall	GP	W	L	T	Pts	GF	GA
Victoriaville Tigres	70	42	23	5	89	314	223
Trois-Rivières Draveurs	70	44	26	0	88	345	278
Longueuil Collège Français	70	39	29	2	80	292	255
Shawinigan Cataractes	70	38	30	2	78	328	275
Laval Titan	70	37	30	3	77	332	274
Hull Olympiques	70	36	29	5	77	306	282
Saint-Hyacinthe Laser	70	35	29	6	76	299	301
Chicoutimi Saguenéens	70	34	33	3	71	280	297
Saint-Jean Lynx	70	30	36	4	64	297	311
Granby Bisons	70	20	49	1	41	227	340
Drummondville Voltigeurs	70	14	55	1	29	232	416

- complete list of standings.

== Scoring leaders ==
Note: GP = Games played; G = Goals; A = Assists; Pts = Points; PIM = Penalties in Minutes

Player	Team	GP	G	A	Pts	PIM
Patrick Lebeau	Saint-Jean / Victoriaville	72	68	106	174	109
Steve Cadieux	Shawinigan Cataractes	67	73	90	163	101
Steve Larouche	Trois-Rivières Draveurs	60	55	90	145	40
Martin St. Amour	Trois-Rivières Draveurs	60	57	79	136	162
Jan Alston	Saint-Jean Lynx	65	61	74	135	137
Paul Willett	Longueuil Collège Français	68	57	75	132	68
Andrew McKim	Hull Olympiques	70	66	64	130	44
Sylvain Fleury	Longueuil Collège Français	70	50	74	124	26
Pierre Sevigny	Saint-Hyacinthe Laser	67	47	72	119	205
Stephane Groleau	Shawinigan Cataractes	70	47	68	115	128

- complete scoring statistics

== Playoffs ==
Denis Chalifoux was the leading scorer of the playoffs with 28 points (14 goals, 14 assists).

Division semifinals

- Victoriaville Tigres defeated Chicoutimi Saguenéens 4 games to 3.
- Saint-Hyacinthe Laser defeated Trois-Rivières Draveurs 4 games to 3.
- Hull Olympiques defeated Longueuil Collège Français 4 games to 3.
- Laval Titan defeated Shawinigan Cataractes 4 games to 2.

Division Finals

- Victoriaville Tigres defeated Saint-Hyacinthe Laser 4 games to 1.
- Laval Titan defeated Hull Olympiques 4 games to 0.

Finals

- Laval Titan defeated Victoriaville Tigres 4 games to 0.

== All-star teams ==
First team

- Goaltender - Pierre Gagnon, Victoriaville Tigres
- Left defence - Karl Dykhuis, Hull Olympiques
- Right defence - Claude Barthe, Victoriaville Tigres
- Left winger - Patrick Lebeau, Victoriaville Tigres
- Centreman - Andrew McKim, Hull Olympiques
- Right winger - Martin Lapointe, Laval Titan
- Coach - Guy Chouinard, Victoriaville Tigres

Second team

- Goaltender - Felix Potvin, Chicoutimi Saguenéens
- Left defence - Francois Groleau, Shawinigan Cataractes
- Right defence - Patrice Brisebois, Laval Titan
- Left winger - Pierre Sevigny, Saint-Hyacinthe Laser
- Centreman - Steve Larouche, Trois-Rivières Draveurs
- Right winger - Sylvain Naud, Laval Titan
- Coach - Gerard Gagnon, Longueuil Collège Français

Rookie team

- Goaltender - Martin Brodeur, Saint-Hyacinthe Laser
- Left defence - Eric Lavigne, Hull Olympiques
- Right defence - Yan Arsenault, Longueuil Collège Français
- Left winger - Patrick Poulin, Saint-Hyacinthe Laser
- Centreman - Charles Poulin, Saint-Hyacinthe Laser
- Right winger - Robert Guillet, Longueuil Collège Français
- Coach - Norman Flynn, Saint-Hyacinthe Laser

List of First/Second/Rookie team all-stars

== Trophies and awards ==
Team

- President's Cup - Playoff Champions, Laval Titan
- Jean Rougeau Trophy - Regular Season Champions, Victoriaville Tigres
- Robert Lebel Trophy - Team with best GAA, Victoriaville Tigres

Player

- Michel Brière Memorial Trophy - Most Valuable Player, Andrew McKim, Hull Olympiques
- Jean Béliveau Trophy - Top Scorer, Patrick Lebeau, Victoriaville Tigres
- Guy Lafleur Trophy - Playoff MVP, Denis Chalifoux, Laval Titan
- Shell Cup – Offensive - Offensive Player of the Year, Patrick Lebeau, Victoriaville Tigres
- Shell Cup – Defensive - Defensive Player of the Year, Pierre Gagnon, Victoriaville Tigres
- Transamerica Plaque - Best plus/minus total, Martin St. Amour, Trois-Rivières Draveurs
- Jacques Plante Memorial Trophy - Best GAA, Pierre Gagnon, Victoriaville Tigres
- Emile Bouchard Trophy - Defenceman of the Year, Claude Barthe, Victoriaville Tigres
- Mike Bossy Trophy - Best Pro Prospect, Karl Dykhuis, Hull Olympiques
- Michel Bergeron Trophy - Offensive Rookie of the Year, Martin Lapointe, Laval Titan
- Raymond Lagacé Trophy - Defensive Rookie of the Year, Francois Groleau, Shawinigan Cataractes
- Frank J. Selke Memorial Trophy - Most sportsmanlike player, Andrew McKim, Hull Olympiques
- Marcel Robert Trophy - Best Scholastic Player, Yanic Perreault, Trois-Rivières Draveurs
- Paul Dumont Trophy - Personality of the Year, Stephane Fiset, Victoriaville Tigres

Executive

- John Horman Trophy - Executive of the Year, Michel "Bunny" Larocque, Victoriaville Tigres

== See also ==
- 1990 Memorial Cup
- 1990 NHL entry draft
- 1989–90 OHL season
- 1989–90 WHL season

Preceded by 1988–89 QMJHL season	QMJHL seasons	Succeeded by 1990–91 QMJHL season
