= Yanic Perreault =

Canadian ice hockey player (born 1971)

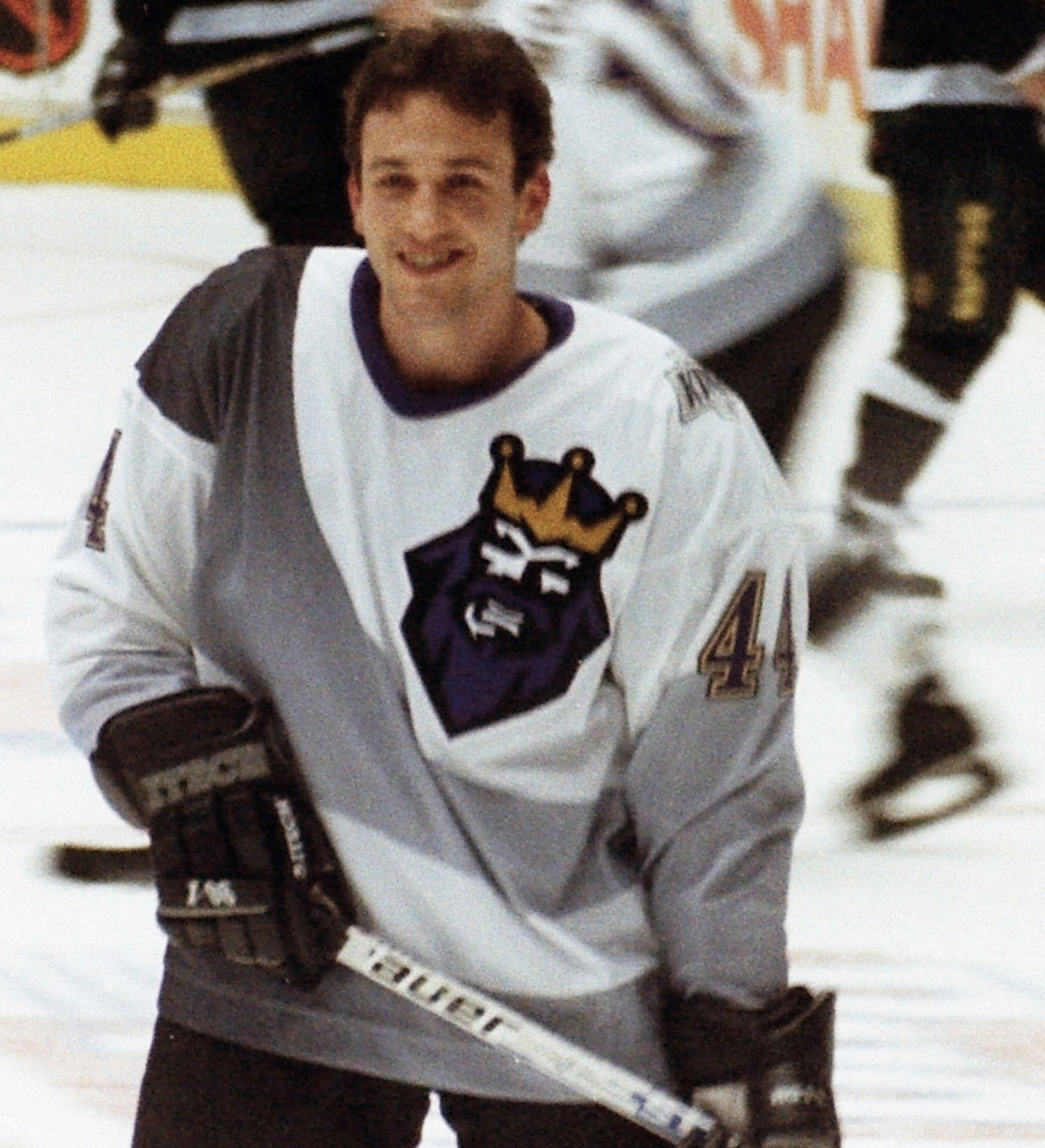
- Perreault with the Los Angeles Kings in 1996
- Born: April 4, 1971 (age 55) Sherbrooke, Quebec, Canada
- Height: 5 ft 11 in (180 cm)
- Weight: 185 lb (84 kg; 13 st 3 lb)
- Position: Centre
- Shot: Left
- Played for: Toronto Maple Leafs; Los Angeles Kings; Montreal Canadiens; Nashville Predators; Phoenix Coyotes; Chicago Blackhawks
- National team: Canada
- NHL draft: 47th overall, 1991; Toronto Maple Leafs
- Playing career: 1991–2008
Medal record
Representing Canada
Ice hockey
World Championships
Silver medal – second place	1996 Vienna

Yanic Jacques Perreault (born April 4, 1971) is a Canadian former professional ice hockey centre who played a total of fourteen seasons in the National Hockey League. He is often considered one of the best face-off men in league history and holds the NHL record for the highest face-off winning percentage in a career (62.86%) as of the conclusion of the 2025–26 NHL season.

== Playing career ==
As a youth, he played in the 1983 and 1984 Quebec International Pee-Wee Hockey Tournaments with a minor ice hockey team from Sherbrooke, Quebec.

Perreault started his hockey career for the Trois-Rivières Draveurs where he was one of the best offensive players in the Quebec Major Junior Hockey League, racking up a total of 185 points in his most productive season. He was drafted in the third round, 47th overall by the Toronto Maple Leafs in the 1991 NHL entry draft.

Carrying a reputation as too slow a skater to succeed in the NHL, Perreault played three years for the St. John's Maple Leafs, Toronto's American Hockey League affiliate. Perreault led the St. John's Maple Leafs to a seventh game in the Calder Cup finals in the 1992 season and to first-place finishes the following two seasons; his 132 goals and 276 points became in that span, and remain, career records for the Leafs' American Hockey League franchise.

Perreault made his NHL debut in the 1993–94 season with the Leafs, showing some promise, before being traded to the Los Angeles Kings for a fourth round pick in 1994. He spent most of that season with the Kings' minor league affiliate, the Phoenix Roadrunners, scoring 51 goals to lead the team.

The following year was his breakout season, making the NHL full-time with the Kings, where he became the team's lead centre after Wayne Gretzky was traded late in the year amidst a full-scale reorganization of the team; Perreault scored 25 goals to finish second on the squad. He played three more seasons in Los Angeles before being sent back to Toronto in 1999, for Jason Podollan and a third round selection. In 2001, Perreault signed with the Montreal Canadiens as a free agent, remaining three seasons before sitting out the lockout year of 2005, after which he signed with the Nashville Predators, with whom he scored 57 points, his NHL career high.

He signed after that single season with the Phoenix Coyotes and was selected to play in the 2007 NHL All-Star Game. On February 27, 2007, Perreault, packaged with a fifth round draft pick, was traded from the Coyotes to Toronto for defencemen Brendan Bell and a second round draft pick, marking his third round of duty with the Maple Leafs.

Perreault signed with the Chicago Blackhawks as a free agent on July 1, 2007. However, with his scoring skills diminishing, he retired at the end of the 2007-08 season.

== Coaching career ==
On October 4, 2013 − one day ahead of the second game of the season - the Blackhawks announced they had hired Perreault to help the team improve its face-off success rate.

== Personal life ==
Perreault has four children, sons Jacob, Jeremy and Gabe, and a daughter Liliane. All of his children also play ice hockey.

== Career statistics ==
=== Regular season and playoffs ===
			Regular season					Playoffs
Season	Team	League	GP	G	A	Pts	PIM	GP	G	A	Pts	PIM
1987–88	Cantons de L'Est Cantonniers	QMAAA	42	70	57	127	14	8	12	10	22	6
1988–89	Trois-Rivières Draveurs	QMJHL	70	53	55	108	48	4	0	0	0	7
1989–90	Trois-Rivières Draveurs	QMJHL	63	51	63	114	75	7	6	5	11	19
1990–91	Trois-Rivières Draveurs	QMJHL	67	87	98	185	103	6	4	7	11	6
1991–92	St. John's Maple Leafs	AHL	62	38	38	76	19	16	7	8	15	4
1992–93	St. John's Maple Leafs	AHL	79	49	46	95	56	9	4	5	9	2
1993–94	St. John's Maple Leafs	AHL	62	45	60	105	38	11	12	6	18	14
1993–94	Toronto Maple Leafs	NHL	13	3	3	6	0	—	—	—	—	—
1994–95	Phoenix Roadrunners	IHL	68	51	48	99	52	—	—	—	—	—
1994–95	Los Angeles Kings	NHL	26	2	5	7	20	—	—	—	—	—
1995–96	Los Angeles Kings	NHL	78	25	24	49	16	—	—	—	—	—
1996–97	Los Angeles Kings	NHL	41	11	14	25	20	—	—	—	—	—
1997–98	Los Angeles Kings	NHL	79	28	20	48	32	4	1	2	3	6
1998–99	Los Angeles Kings	NHL	64	10	17	27	30	—	—	—	—	—
1998–99	Toronto Maple Leafs	NHL	12	7	8	15	12	17	3	6	9	6
1999–00	Toronto Maple Leafs	NHL	58	18	27	45	22	1	0	1	1	0
2000–01	Toronto Maple Leafs	NHL	76	24	28	52	52	11	2	3	5	4
2001–02	Montreal Canadiens	NHL	82	27	29	56	40	11	3	5	8	0
2002–03	Montreal Canadiens	NHL	73	24	22	46	30	—	—	—	—	—
2003–04	Montreal Canadiens	NHL	69	16	15	31	40	9	2	2	4	0
2005–06	Nashville Predators	NHL	69	22	35	57	30	1	0	0	0	2
2006–07	Phoenix Coyotes	NHL	49	19	14	33	30	—	—	—	—	—
2006–07	Toronto Maple Leafs	NHL	17	2	3	5	4	—	—	—	—	—
2007–08	Chicago Blackhawks	NHL	53	9	5	14	24	—	—	—	—	—
NHL totals			859	247	269	516	402	54	11	19	30	18

=== International ===
Year	Team	Event	Result	GP	G	A	Pts	PIM
1996	Canada	WC	2nd place, silver medalist(s)	8	6	3	9	0
Senior totals				8	6	3	9	0

== Awards and honours ==
Award	Year
QMJHL
Michel Bergeron Trophy (Offensive Rookie of the Year)	1989
Canadian Major Junior - Rookie of the Year	1989
First All-Star Team	1991
Frank J. Selke Memorial Trophy (Most Gentlemanly Player)	1991
Jean Beliveau Trophy (Leading scorer)	1991
Michel Briere Trophy (Most Valuable Player)	1991
World Championships
Best Forward	1996
NHL
NHL All-Star Game	2007
