= 1990–91 AHL season =

- League: American Hockey League
- Sport: Ice hockey

Regular season
- F. G. "Teddy" Oke Trophy: Springfield Indians
- Season MVP: Kevin Todd
- Top scorer: Kevin Todd
- MVP: Kay Whitmore

Playoffs
- Champions: Springfield Indians
- Runners-up: Rochester Americans

AHL seasons
- 1989–90 1991–92

The 1990–91 AHL season was the 55th season of the American Hockey League. Fifteen teams played 80 games each in the schedule. The Rochester Americans finished first overall in the regular season. The Springfield Indians won their seventh and final Calder Cup championship.

== Team changes ==
- The Binghamton Whalers became the Binghamton Rangers.
- The Sherbrooke Canadiens moved to Fredericton, New Brunswick, becoming the Fredericton Canadiens.
- The dormant Boston Braves resumed operations as the Capital District Islanders, based in Troy, New York, playing in the South Division.

== Final standings ==
- y– indicates team clinched division and a playoff spot
- x– indicates team clinched a playoff spot
- e– indicates team was eliminated from playoff contention

North Division	GP	W	L	T	Pts	GF	GA
y–Springfield Indians (HFD)	80	43	27	10	96	348	281
x–Cape Breton Oilers (EDM)	80	41	31	8	90	306	301
x–Moncton Hawks (WIN)	80	36	32	12	84	270	267
x–Fredericton Canadiens (MTL)	80	36	35	9	81	295	292
x–Maine Mariners (BOS)	80	34	34	12	80	269	284
e–Halifax Citadels (QUE)	80	33	35	12	78	338	340
e–New Haven Nighthawks (LAK)	80	24	45	11	59	246	324

South Division	GP	W	L	T	Pts	GF	GA
y–Rochester Americans (BUF)	80	45	26	9	99	326	253
x–Binghamton Rangers (NYR)	80	44	30	6	94	318	274
x–Baltimore Skipjacks (WSH)	80	39	34	7	85	325	289
x–Hershey Bears (PHI)	80	33	35	12	78	313	324
x–Adirondack Red Wings (DET)	80	33	37	10	76	320	346
e–Utica Devils (NJD)	80	36	42	2	74	325	346
e–Capital District Islanders (NYI)	80	28	43	9	65	284	323
e–Newmarket Saints (TOR)	80	26	45	9	61	278	317

== Scoring leaders ==
Note: GP = Games played; G = Goals; A = Assists; Pts = Points; PIM = Penalty minutes

Player	Team	GP	G	A	Pts	PIM
Kevin Todd	Utica Devils	75	37	81	118	75
Patrick Lebeau	Fredericton Canadiens	69	50	51	101	32
Shaun Van Allen	Cape Breton Oilers	76	25	75	100	182
Bill McDougall	Adirondack Red Wings	71	47	52	99	192
Jesse Belanger	Fredericton Canadiens	75	40	58	98	30
Neil Brady	Utica Devils	77	33	63	96	91
Michel Picard	Springfield Indians	77	56	40	96	61
James Black	Springfield Indians	79	35	61	96	34
Miroslav Ihnacak	Halifax Citadels	77	38	57	95	42
Dan Currie	Cape Breton Oilers	71	47	45	92	51

- complete list

== Calder Cup playoffs ==
Preliminary Round
4	Fredericton	11
5	Maine	7
4	Hershey	13
5	Adirondack	4

Division Semifinals
1	Springfield	4
4	Fredericton	3
North Division
2	Cape Breton	0
3	Moncton	4
2	Binghamton	4
3	Baltimore	2
South Division
1	Rochester	4
4	Hershey	1

Division Finals
1	Springfield	4
3	Moncton	1
2	Binghamton	0
1	Rochester	4

Calder Cup Final
N1	Springfield	4
S1	Rochester	2

Note: Preliminary Round was played as a two-game, total-goals series

== Trophy and award winners ==
Team awards

Calder Cup; Playoff champions:	Springfield Indians
Richard F. Canning Trophy; North division playoff champions:	Springfield Indians
Robert W. Clarke Trophy; South division playoff champions:	Rochester Americans
F. G. "Teddy" Oke Trophy; Regular Season champions, North Division:	Springfield Indians
John D. Chick Trophy; Regular Season champions, South Division:	Rochester Americans

Individual awards

Les Cunningham Award; Most valuable player:	Kevin Todd - Utica Devils
John B. Sollenberger Trophy; Top point scorer:	Kevin Todd - Utica Devils
Dudley "Red" Garrett Memorial Award; Rookie of the year:	Patrick Lebeau - Fredericton Canadiens
Eddie Shore Award; Defenceman of the year:	Norm Maciver - Cape Breton Oilers
Aldege "Baz" Bastien Memorial Award; Best Goaltender:	Mark Laforest - Binghamton Rangers
Harry "Hap" Holmes Memorial Award; Lowest goals against average:	David Littman & Darcy Wakaluk - Rochester Americans
Louis A.R. Pieri Memorial Award; Coach of the year:	Don Lever - Rochester Americans
Fred T. Hunt Memorial Award; Sportsmanship / Perseverance:	Glenn Merkosky - Adirondack Red Wings
Jack A. Butterfield Trophy; MVP of the playoffs:	Kay Whitmore - Springfield Indians

Other awards

James C. Hendy Memorial Award; Most outstanding executive:	Frank Mathers
James H. Ellery Memorial Awards; Outstanding media coverage:	Bob Dittmeier, Adirondack / Capital District, (newspaper); Bob Matthews, Rochester, (radio); Jimmy Young & Tom Caron, Maine, (television)
Ken McKenzie Award; Outstanding marketing executive:	Jan MacDonald, New Haven Nighthawks

== See also ==
- List of AHL seasons

Preceded by 1989–90 AHL season	AHL seasons	Succeeded by 1991–92 AHL season
