= Felix Potvin =

Canadian ice hockey player (born 1971)

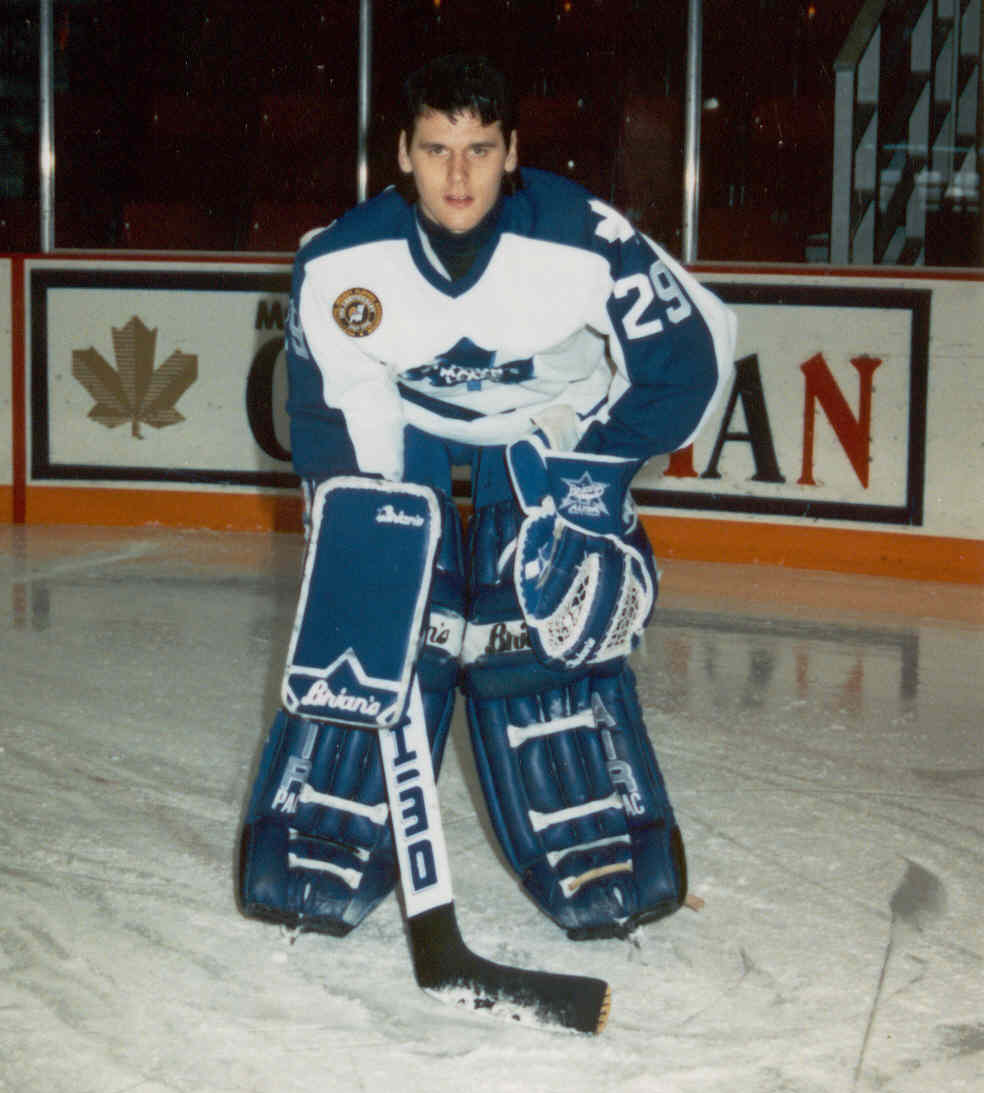
- Potvin with the St. John's Maple Leafs
- Born: June 23, 1971 (age 55) Anjou, Quebec, Canada
- Height: 6 ft 1 in (185 cm)
- Weight: 191 lb (87 kg; 13 st 9 lb)
- Position: Goaltender
- Caught: Left
- Played for: Toronto Maple Leafs; New York Islanders; Vancouver Canucks; Los Angeles Kings; Boston Bruins
- National team: Canada
- NHL draft: 31st overall, 1990; Toronto Maple Leafs
- Playing career: 1991–2004

Félix "The Cat" Potvin (born June 23, 1971) is a Canadian former professional ice hockey goaltender who played 14 seasons in the National Hockey League (NHL).

== Early career ==
As a youth, Potvin played in the 1983 and 1984 Quebec International Pee-Wee Hockey Tournaments with a minor ice hockey team from Mercier, Quebec.

From 1988 through to 1991 Potvin played with the Chicoutimi Saguenéens, a Quebec Major Junior Hockey League (QMJHL) team. In the 1990–91 season Potvin was awarded the Guy Lafleur Trophy as Playoff MVP.

== NHL career ==
Potvin was drafted in the second round, 31st overall, by the Toronto Maple Leafs in the 1990 National Hockey League entry draft on June 16, 1990. In the 1991–92 season, Potvin played 35 games for the St. John's Maple Leafs, compiling a 2.93 GAA. For his efforts, Potvin was awarded the Dudley "Red" Garrett Memorial Award (rookie of the year), the Baz Bastien Memorial Trophy as the top goaltender in the AHL and selected to the AHL First All-Star Team. During that season, Potvin was called up to the NHL and saw brief action in 4 games, compiling a 2.28 GAA and a .933 save percentage.

It wasn't until the 1992–93 season that Potvin became a regular in the NHL. That season he played 48 games, compiling a 2.50 GAA (1st in the NHL) and a solid .910 save %. The rapid acceleration of his development led the coaching staff to establish him as their #1 goaltender and prompted the trade of Grant Fuhr to the Buffalo Sabres on February 2, 1993. That season, Potvin also backstopped the Maple Leafs to the Stanley Cup conference finals, only to lose to the Los Angeles Kings in a grueling seven-game series. His dynamic performance made him a finalist for the Calder Memorial Trophy.

In the 1993–94 season, Potvin silenced any doubts of a sophomore jinx. He posted 34 wins and a solid 2.89 GAA, including tying Kirk McLean's then NHL record for most wins in October with nine. He was also voted to his first NHL All-Star Game in which his mask art was voted leagues best. In the 1993–94 playoffs, Potvin recorded 3 shutouts in the first-round series against the Chicago Blackhawks, all by a 1–0 margin, including the final NHL game ever played at the illustrious Chicago Stadium. He also became the first Maple Leafs goaltender to stop a penalty shot in a Stanley Cup Playoff game, when he stopped Chicago's Patrick Poulin. Potvin again brought his team to the conference finals, this time losing to the Vancouver Canucks in five games.

In the 1995–96 season, Potvin was selected to his 2nd NHL All-Star Game. However, the Toronto Maple Leafs exited in the first round of the playoffs. The following season, with the aging of the defence corps in front of him, Potvin and the Maple Leafs would miss the playoffs. He would set an NHL record for most shots faced in a season, 2,438, later broken by Roberto Luongo during his stint with the Florida Panthers. On July 15, 1998, Toronto signed free agent Curtis Joseph, leaving Potvin expendable. He would play in only 5 games due to a knee injury, before he and a sixth-round pick (Fedor Fedorov) were traded to the New York Islanders for defenceman Bryan Berard and a sixth-round pick, on January 9, 1999. Despite the new surroundings, Potvin was unable to reclaim the success he had in Toronto.

The next season, on December 19, 1999, Potvin, and second and third-round draft picks were traded to the Vancouver Canucks for Kevin Weekes, Dave Scatchard, and Bill Muckalt. Potvin struggled with the Canucks and in the 2000–01 season he was dealt to the Los Angeles Kings for future considerations on February 15, 2001. Immediately, Potvin made an impact leading the Kings to the 7th seed, recording 13 wins and 5 losses. He had a remarkable 1.96 GAA and a .919 save %. Potvin led the Kings to a first-round upset of the Detroit Red Wings, and pushed the eventual Stanley Cup Champion Colorado Avalanche to a 7th game in the second round, recording 2 shutouts in that series. Game 6 of that series was a memorable duel between Potvin and Colorado goalie Patrick Roy, which the Kings and Potvin won 1–0 in double overtime.

Potvin again led the Kings to the 2002 playoffs, where they pushed the Colorado Avalanche to 7 games (rallying from a 3–1 series deficit) in the 1st round.

On September 3, 2003, Potvin was signed to a one-year contract by the Boston Bruins. He backed-up Calder Memorial Trophy Winner Andrew Raycroft during the 2003–04 season. Coincidentally, Raycroft broke Potvin's record for consecutive games played by a Maple Leafs goalie during the 2006–07 season. Early in the 2005–06 season, the Atlanta Thrashers were in talks with Potvin in hopes of signing him after starting goaltender Kari Lehtonen and backup goaltender Mike Dunham went down with injuries. However, Potvin did not have equipment that conformed to the new NHL standards, nor did he wish to accept the two-way contract that was being offered to him, so the Thrashers instead decided to sign Steve Shields.

== International Play ==
Potvin played at the 1991 World Junior Ice Hockey Championships, as a member of the Canadian team, where he won a gold medal. He served as a backup to Trevor Kidd.

Felix would also play for Canada at the 1998 IIHF World Championship.

== Coaching ==
Potvin currently lives with his wife Sabrina Tardif, and his three children Noemie, Xavier, and Felicia in Magog, Quebec, where he is the head coach for the midget AAA Magog Cantonniers who placed second at both the 2018 and 2019 Telus Cup.

== Career statistics ==
=== Regular season and playoffs ===
			Regular season									Playoffs
Season	Team	League	GP	W	L	T	MIN	GA	SO	GAA	SV%	GP	W	L	MIN	GA	SO	GAA	SV%
1988–89	Chicoutimi Saguenéens	QMJHL	65	25	31	1	3489	271	2	4.46	.868	—	—	—	—	—	—	—	—
1989–90	Chicoutimi Saguenéens	QMJHL	62	31	26	2	3478	231	2	3.99	.885	7	3	4	437	29	0	3.98	.880
1990–91	Chicoutimi Saguenéens	QMJHL	54	33	15	4	3216	145	6	2.70	.910	16	11	5	992	46	0	2.78	.901
1990–91	Chicoutimi Saguenéens	MC	—	—	—	—	—	—	—	—	—	3	1	2	174	8	0	2.76
1991–92	St. John's Maple Leafs	AHL	34	18	10	6	2070	101	2	2.93	.908	11	7	4	642	41	0	3.83	.895
1991–92	Toronto Maple Leafs	NHL	4	0	2	1	210	8	0	2.29	.933	—	—	—	—	—	—	—	—
1992–93	St. John's Maple Leafs	AHL	5	3	0	2	309	18	0	3.50	.894	—	—	—	—	—	—	—	—
1992–93	Toronto Maple Leafs	NHL	48	25	15	7	2781	116	2	2.50	.910	21	11	10	1308	62	1	2.84	.903
1993–94	Toronto Maple Leafs	NHL	66	34	22	9	3883	187	2	2.89	.907	18	9	9	1124	46	3	2.46	.912
1994–95	Toronto Maple Leafs	NHL	36	15	13	7	2144	104	0	2.91	.907	7	3	4	424	20	1	2.83	.921
1995–96	Toronto Maple Leafs	NHL	69	30	26	11	4009	192	2	2.87	.910	6	2	4	350	19	0	3.27	.904
1996–97	Toronto Maple Leafs	NHL	74	27	36	7	4217	224	0	3.15	.908	—	—	—	—	—	—	—	—
1997–98	Toronto Maple Leafs	NHL	67	26	33	7	3864	176	5	2.73	.906	—	—	—	—	—	—	—	—
1998–99	Toronto Maple Leafs	NHL	5	3	2	0	299	19	0	3.81	.866	—	—	—	—	—	—	—	—
1998–99	New York Islanders	NHL	11	2	7	1	606	37	0	3.66	.893	—	—	—	—	—	—	—	—
1999–2000	New York Islanders	NHL	22	5	14	3	1273	68	1	3.21	.892	—	—	—	—	—	—	—	—
1999–2000	Vancouver Canucks	NHL	34	12	13	7	1996	85	0	2.59	.906	—	—	—	—	—	—	—	—
2000–01	Vancouver Canucks	NHL	35	14	17	3	2006	103	1	3.08	.887	—	—	—	—	—	—	—	—
2000–01	Los Angeles Kings	NHL	23	13	5	5	1410	46	5	1.96	.919	13	7	6	812	33	2	2.44	.909
2001–02	Los Angeles Kings	NHL	71	31	27	8	4071	157	6	2.31	.907	7	3	4	417	15	1	2.16	.925
2002–03	Los Angeles Kings	NHL	42	17	20	3	2367	105	3	2.66	.894	—	—	—	—	—	—	—	—
2003–04	Boston Bruins	NHL	28	12	8	6	1605	67	4	2.50	.903	—	—	—	—	—	—	—	—
NHL totals			635	266	260	85	36,765	1,694	32	2.76	.905	72	35	37	4,435	195	8	2.64	.910

=== International ===
Year	Team	Event	GP	W	L	T	MIN	GA	SO	GAA
1991	Canada	WJC	2				80	3	0	2.25
1998	Canada	WC	4	3	1	0	240	8	0	2.00

== Awards ==
- 1995–96 NHL All-Star Game
- 1993–94 NHL All-Star Game
- 1992–93 NHL All-Rookie Team
- 1991–92 AHL Dudley "Red" Garret Memorial Trophy
- 1991–92 AHL Baz Bastien Memorial Trophy
- 1990–91 CHL Goaltender of the Year
- 1990–91 QMJHL Jacques Plante Trophy
- 1990–91 QMJHL Guy Lafleur Trophy
- 1990–91 QMJHL Hap Emms Trophy

Awards and achievements
Preceded by Mark Laforest	Aldege "Baz" Bastien Memorial Award; 1991–92	Succeeded by Corey Hirsch
