= Pierre Sévigny (ice hockey) =

Canadian ice hockey player

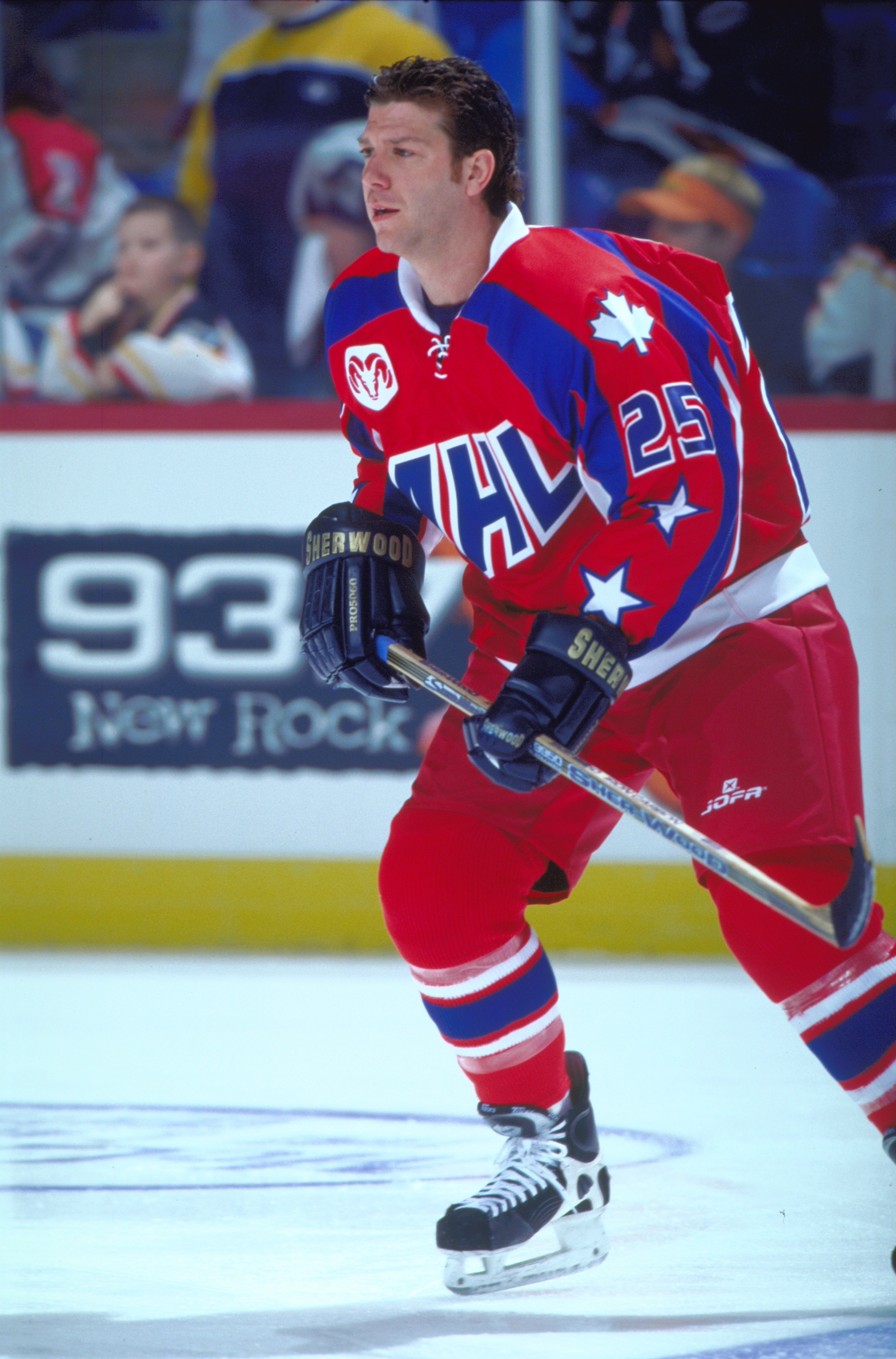
- Born: September 8, 1971 (age 54) Trois-Rivières, Quebec, Canada
- Height: 6 ft 0 in (183 cm)
- Weight: 195 lb (88 kg; 13 st 13 lb)
- Position: Left Wing
- Shot: Left
- Played for: Montreal Canadiens; New York Rangers; Straubing Tigers
- NHL draft: 51st overall, 1989; Montreal Canadiens
- Playing career: 1991–2006

Joseph Jean Pierre Sévigny (born September 8, 1971) is a Canadian former professional ice hockey player who played in the National Hockey League (NHL).

== Playing career ==
As a junior, he played for the Verdun Junior Canadiens and Saint-Hyacinthe Laser of the Quebec Major Junior Hockey League. He was drafted in the third round of the 1989 NHL entry draft by the Montreal Canadiens. A left-winger, he was for many years considered to be one of their top prospects. Sévigny was later a member of the Canadian national team that won the gold medal at the 1991 World Junior Ice Hockey Championships.

Sévigny went long stretches without scoring and spent most of his six years in the Canadiens' organization playing for their minor-league affiliate, the Fredericton Canadiens. He appeared in only 75 regular-season games with Montreal. He later signed as a free agent with the New York Rangers, where he appeared in three more NHL games in 1997–98.

Sévigny continued to play professionally at various minor-league levels and in Europe until 2006. Following a stint coaching Les Lions du Collège St-Lawrence of the Quebec AAA Junior Hockey League, in 2007 he became the head coach of the Quebec Radio X of the Ligue Nord-Américaine de Hockey, a low-level professional league based in Quebec.

== Career statistics ==
=== Regular season and playoffs ===
			Regular season					Playoffs
Season	Team	League	GP	G	A	Pts	PIM	GP	G	A	Pts	PIM
1987–88	Cantons de l'Est Cantonniers	QMAAA	40	43	78	121	72	8	8	9	17	26
1988–89	Verdun Junior Canadiens	QMJHL	67	27	43	70	88	—	—	—	—	—
1989–90	St. Hyacinthe Lasers	QMJHL	67	47	72	119	205	12	8	8	16	42
1990–91	St. Hyacinthe Lasers	QMJHL	60	36	46	82	203	—	—	—	—	—
1991–92	Fredericton Canadiens	AHL	74	22	37	59	145	7	1	1	2	26
1992–93	Fredericton Canadiens	AHL	80	36	40	76	113	5	1	1	2	2
1993–94	Montreal Canadiens	NHL	43	4	5	9	42	3	0	1	1	0
1994–95	Montreal Canadiens	NHL	19	0	0	0	15	—	—	—	—	—
1995–96	Fredericton Canadiens	AHL	76	39	42	81	188	10	5	9	14	20
1996–97	Montreal Canadiens	NHL	13	0	0	0	5	—	—	—	—	—
1996–97	Fredericton Canadiens	AHL	32	9	17	26	58	—	—	—	—	—
1997–98	Hartford Wolf Pack	AHL	40	18	13	31	94	12	3	5	8	14
1997–98	New York Rangers	NHL	3	0	0	0	2	—	—	—	—	—
1998–99	Long Beach Ice Dogs	IHL	6	1	3	4	7	—	—	—	—	—
1998–99	Orlando Solar Bears	IHL	43	11	21	32	44	15	4	5	9	32
1999–00	Quebec Citadelles	AHL	78	24	43	67	154	3	3	0	3	17
2000–01	Quebec Citadelles	AHL	79	29	37	66	138	8	0	1	1	17
2001–02	Quebec Citadelles	AHL	66	13	17	30	76	3	0	0	0	0
2002–03	Straubing Tigers	2.GBun	54	31	48	79	150	3	0	3	3	8
2003–04	Thetford Mines Prolab	QSPHL	47	30	52	82	142	12	9	13	22	28
2004–05	Thetford Mines Prolab	LNAH	6	0	1	1	7	—	—	—	—	—
2004–05	Quebec RadioX	LNAH	29	5	20	25	46	14	8	5	13	49
2004–05	Sainte-Marie Structures Derek	QSCHL	16	5	10	15	54	—	—	—	—	—
2005–06	Quebec RadioX	LNAH	1	0	0	0	0	—	—	—	—	—
2007–08	Pont-Rouge Précision	QSCHL	2	1	5	6	6	—	—	—	—	—
NHL totals			78	4	5	9	64	3	0	1	1	0

Medal record

Representing Canada

Ice hockey

World Junior Championships
Gold medal – first place	1991 Canada	

=== International ===
Year	Team	Event	Result	GP	G	A	Pts	PIM
1991	Canada	WJC	1st place, gold medalist(s)	7	4	2	6	8
Junior totals				7	4	2	6	8

== Awards and honours ==
Award	Year
QMJHL
All-Rookie Team	1989
Second All-Star Team	1990, 1991
AHL
All-Star Game	1996, 2000, 2001
