= NASCAR Canada =

NASCAR Canada is the NASCAR office in Canada.

NASCAR opened an office in its second largest market in Canada in 2004. NASCAR opened a corporate office in Toronto in a joint partnership with Canadian media company TSN. The move was made to boost sponsorship and licensing opportunities, and to build on its interest in Canada.

The office facilitates marketing rights to the NASCAR brand to Canadian companies, and to extend United States companies reach into Canada.

From 2007 to 2012, a NASCAR Xfinity Series event in Montreal's Circuit Gilles Villeneuve was held on the first weekend in August: the NAPA Auto Parts 200. From 2013 to 2019, the NASCAR Camping World Truck Series held the Chevrolet Silverado 250 at Canadian Tire Motorsport Park. In the past some US-based regional racing series have crossed the border on occasion, and currently the NASCAR Canada Series runs thirteen events a year on tracks all across Canada.
