= Denis Chalifoux =

Canadian ice hockey player

- Born: February 21, 1971 (age 55) Laval, Quebec, Canada
- Height: 5 ft 8 in (173 cm)
- Weight: 165 lb (75 kg; 11 st 11 lb)
- Position: Centre
- Shot: Right
- Played for: Springfield Indians (1992–1994); Worcester IceCats (1995); Cornwall Aces, Minnesota Moose (1996); WSV Sterzing – SSI Vipiteno Broncos (1998-9); VEU Feldkirch (2000); Springfield Falcons, Phoenix Mustangs (2001); Laval Chiefs (2001-08)
- NHL draft: 12th round, 246th overall, 1990; Hartford Whalers
- Playing career: 1991–2008

Denis Chalifoux is a retired professional ice hockey player, most notably with the Springfield Indians of the American Hockey League and the Laval Chiefs of the Ligue Nord-Américaine de Hockey (LNAH).

== History ==
=== Junior career ===
Chalifoux played his major junior hockey with the Laval Titan of the Quebec Major Junior Hockey League, between 1987 and 1991. In his last two seasons with the club, he was the team's leading scorer, and is the franchise's third-leading all-time scorer after Hockey Hall of Fame players Mario Lemieux and Mike Bossy. In 1990, Chalifoux was the leading scorer in the playoffs and won the Guy Lafleur Trophy for playoff Most Valuable Player, en route to leading the Titan to the league championship and a Memorial Cup berth. In 1991, he finished third in the league in scoring and was chosen to the Second All-Star Team.

=== Professional career ===
Drafted by the Hartford Whalers of the National Hockey League in the 12th round of the 1990 NHL entry draft, Chalifoux reported to the Whalers' farm team, the defending Calder Cup champion Springfield Indians. He played the next three seasons for the Indians, serving as the team's third-line center for the first two. In the 1994 season - the final season for the 52-year-old Indians franchise - he was playing much better, scoring over a point a game, when a shoulder injury ended his season after 44 games.

Not tendered a contract the next season after his entry-level contract had expired, Chalifoux signed with the Worcester IceCats, the team's first season. He led the team in scoring, centering a line including old Indians' teammate Blair Atcheynum, but played only a single season with the club, and signed for the 1995 season with the Cornwall Aces, whom he likewise led in scoring.

He played the next three seasons in Europe, playing for WSV Sterzing – SSI Vipiteno Broncos of the Italian league and VEU Feldkirch of the Austrian league, before returning to Laval in 2000 to play with the hometown Laval Chiefs of the LNAH, with whom he would spend the rest of his professional career and be the career scoring leader.

=== Coaching ===
Chalifoux coached the Shawinigan Cataractes of the Quebec Major Junior Hockey League for the 2012-13 season. The team finished in last place, with a 15-46-7 record, and Chalifoux was let go after the season concluded.
