= 1994–95 AHL season =

- League: American Hockey League
- Sport: Ice hockey

Regular season
- F. G. "Teddy" Oke Trophy: Albany River Rats
- Season MVP: Steve Larouche
- Top scorer: Peter White

Playoffs
- Playoffs MVP: Corey Schwab; Mike Dunham

Calder Cup
- Champions: Albany River Rats
- Runners-up: Fredericton Canadiens

AHL seasons
- 1993–94 1995–96

The 1994–95 AHL season was the 59th season of the American Hockey League. The All-Star Game is revived, with All-Stars grouped into "Team Canada" and "Team USA." Sixteen teams played 80 games each in the schedule. The Albany River Rats finished first overall in the regular season, and won their first Calder Cup championship.

== Team changes ==
- The Moncton Hawks cease operations.
- The Hamilton Canucks move to Syracuse, New York, becoming the Syracuse Crunch.
- The Springfield Indians move to Worcester, Massachusetts, becoming the Worcester Ice Cats.
- The Springfield Falcons join the AHL as an expansion team, based in Springfield, Massachusetts, playing in the North Division.

== Final standings ==
- y– indicates team clinched division and a playoff spot
- x– indicates team clinched a playoff spot
- e– indicates team was eliminated from playoff contention

Atlantic Division	GP	W	L	T	Pts	GF	GA
y–Prince Edward Island Senators (OTT)	80	41	31	8	90	305	271
x–St. John's Maple Leafs (TOR)	80	33	37	10	76	263	263
x–Fredericton Canadiens (MTL)	80	35	40	5	75	274	288
x–Saint John Flames (CGY)	80	27	40	13	67	250	286
e–Cape Breton Oilers (EDM)	80	27	44	9	63	298	342

North Division	GP	W	L	T	Pts	GF	GA
y–Albany River Rats (NJD)	80	46	17	17	109	293	219
x–Portland Pirates (WSH)	80	46	22	12	104	333	233
x–Providence Bruins (BOS)	80	39	30	11	89	300	268
x–Adirondack Red Wings (DET)	80	32	38	10	74	271	294
e–Springfield Falcons (HFD/WIN)	80	31	37	12	74	269	289
e–Worcester IceCats (independent)	80	24	45	11	59	234	300

South Division	GP	W	L	T	Pts	GF	GA
y–Binghamton Rangers (NYR)	80	43	30	7	93	302	261
x–Cornwall Aces (QUE)	80	38	33	9	85	236	248
x–Hershey Bears (PHI)	80	34	36	10	78	275	300
x–Rochester Americans (BUF)	80	35	38	7	77	300	304
e–Syracuse Crunch (VAN)	80	29	42	9	67	288	325

== Scoring leaders ==
Note: GP = Games played; G = Goals; A = Assists; Pts = Points; PIM = Penalty minutes

Player	Team	GP	G	A	Pts	PIM
Peter White	Cape Breton Oilers	65	36	69	105	30
Steve Larouche	Prince Edward Island Senators	70	53	48	101	54
Andrew McKim	Adirondack Red Wings	77	39	55	94	22
Ralph Intranuovo	Cape Breton Oilers	70	46	47	93	62
Brett Harkins	Providence Bruins	80	23	69	92	32
Todd Simon	Rochester Americans	69	25	65	90	78
Michel Picard	Prince Edward Island Senators	57	32	57	89	58
Mitch Lamoureux	Hershey Bears	76	39	46	85	112
Shawn McCosh	Binghamton Rangers	67	23	60	83	73
Jeff Nelson	Portland Pirates	64	33	50	83	57

- complete list

== Calder Cup playoffs ==
Division semifinals
A1	P.E.I.	4
A4	Saint John	1
Atlantic Division
A2	St. John's	1
A3	Fredericton	4
N1	Albany	4
N4	Adirondack	0
North Division
N2	Portland	3
N3	Providence	4
S1	Binghamton	4
S4	Rochester	1
South Division
S2	Cornwall	4
S3	Hershey	2

Division finals
A1	P.E.I.	2
A3	Fredericton	4
N1	Albany	4
N3	Providence	2
S1	Binghamton	2
S2	Cornwall	4

Semifinals
S2	Cornwall	0
A3	Fredericton	2

Final
N1	Albany	4
A3	Fredericton	0

For the Semifinal, the team that earned the most points during the regular season out of the three remaining teams receives a bye directly to the Calder Cup Final. There is no set series format due to arena scheduling conflicts and travel considerations.

== All Star Classic ==
The AHL revived the All-Star Classic, having last held the event during the 1959–60 season. The 8th AHL All-Star Game was played on January 17, 1995, at the Providence Civic Center in Providence, Rhode Island. Team Canada defeated Team USA 6–4.

== Trophy and award winners ==
=== Team awards ===
Calder Cup; Playoff champions:	Albany River Rats
Richard F. Canning Trophy; North division playoff champions:	Albany River Rats
Robert W. Clarke Trophy; South division playoff champions:	Cornwall Aces
F. G. "Teddy" Oke Trophy; Regular Season champions, North Division:	Albany River Rats
John D. Chick Trophy; Regular Season champions, South Division:	Binghamton Rangers

=== Individual awards ===
Les Cunningham Award; Most valuable player:	Steve Larouche – Prince Edward Island Senators
John B. Sollenberger Trophy; Top point scorer:	Peter White – Cape Breton Oilers
Dudley "Red" Garrett Memorial Award; Rookie of the year:	Jim Carey – Portland Pirates
Eddie Shore Award; Defenceman of the year:	Jeff Serowik – Providence Bruins
Aldege "Baz" Bastien Memorial Award; Best Goaltender:	Jim Carey – Portland Pirates
Harry "Hap" Holmes Memorial Award; Lowest goals against average:	Mike Dunham & Corey Schwab – Albany River Rats
Louis A.R. Pieri Memorial Award; Coach of the year:	Robbie Ftorek – Albany River Rats
Fred T. Hunt Memorial Award; Sportsmanship / Perseverance:	Steve Larouche – Prince Edward Island Senators
Jack A. Butterfield Trophy; MVP of the playoffs:	Corey Schwab & Mike Dunham – Albany River Rats

=== Other awards ===
James C. Hendy Memorial Award; Most outstanding executive:	Doug Burch, Albany River Rats
James H. Ellery Memorial Awards; Outstanding media coverage:	Bill Hunt, Fredericton, (newspaper); John Colletto, Providence, (radio); Adam Benigni, Syracuse, (television)
Ken McKenzie Award; Outstanding marketing executive:	Tim Kuhl, Syracuse Crunch

== See also ==
- List of AHL seasons

Preceded by 1993–94 AHL season	AHL seasons	Succeeded by 1995–96 AHL season
