= 2010–11 LNAH season =

Canadian ice hockey league season

The 2010–11 LNAH season was the 15th season of the Ligue Nord-Américaine de Hockey (before 2004 the Quebec Semi-Pro Hockey League), a minor professional league in the Canadian province of Quebec. Seven teams participated in the regular season, and Saint-Francois de Sherbrooke won the league title.

== Regular season ==
| | GP | W | L | OTL | SOL | GF | GA | Pts |
|---|---|---|---|---|---|---|---|---|
| Cool FM 103,5 de Saint-Georges | 42 | 29 | 10 | 0 | 3 | 172 | 125 | 61 |
| Caron & Guay de Trois-Rivières | 42 | 23 | 17 | 2 | 0 | 178 | 150 | 48 |
| Saint-François de Sherbrooke | 42 | 22 | 15 | 3 | 2 | 166 | 145 | 47 |
| Isothermic de Thetford Mines | 42 | 22 | 17 | 2 | 1 | 172 | 164 | 47 |
| GCI de Sorel-Tracy | 42 | 21 | 18 | 2 | 3 | 159 | 180 | 43 |
| Marquis de Saguenay | 42 | 17 | 19 | 5 | 1 | 172 | 188 | 42 |
| 3L de Rivière-du-Loup | 42 | 15 | 24 | 0 | 3 | 143 | 210 | 33 |

== Coupe Canam-Playoffs ==
Coupe Canam-Quarterfinals
1 | Cool FM 103,5 de St.-Georges
Bye
2 | Caron & Guay de Trois-Rivières | 2
7 | 3L de Rivière-du-Loup | 3
3 | Saint-François de Sherbrooke | 3
5 | GCI de Sorel-Tracy | 1
4 | Isothermic de Thetford Mines | 3
6 | Marquis de Saguenay | 1

Coupe Canam-Semifinals
1 | Cool FM 103,5 de St.-Georges | 4
7 | 3L de Rivière-du-Loup | 1
3 | Saint-François de Sherbrooke | 4
4 | Isothermic de Thetford Mines | 3

Coupe Canam-Final
1 | Cool FM 103,5 de St.-Georges | 0
3 | Saint-François de Sherbrooke | 4
