= Saint-Jean Lynx =

- City: Saint-Jean-sur-Richelieu, Quebec
- League: QMJHL
- Operated: 1982 to 1995
- Home arena: Colisée Isabelle-Brasseur

Franchise history
- 1969-82: Sherbrooke Castors
- 1982-89: Saint-Jean Castors
- 1989-95: Saint-Jean Lynx
- 1995-present: Rimouski Océanic

The Saint-Jean Lynx were a junior ice hockey team which played from 1989 to 1995 in the Quebec Major Junior Hockey League. They played at the Colisée Isabelle-Brasseur. In 1982, they moved from Sherbrooke where they were formerly the Sherbrooke Castors. They were known as the Saint-Jean Castors from 1982 until 1989. In 1995, they moved to Rimouski to become the Rimouski Océanic.

== NHL alumni ==
Totals include both the St-Jean Lynx and St-Jean Castors.

- Jan Alston
- Stephane Beauregard
- Paul Boutilier
- Philippe Bozon
- Stephane Brochu
- Steve Brûlé
- Frederic Cassivi
- Denis Chasse
- Jason Doig
- Gerard Gallant
- Eric Germain
- Francois Groleau
- Benoit Hogue
- Eric Houde
- Patrick Labrecque
- Georges Laraque
- Dominic Lavoie
- Patrick Lebeau
- Francois Leroux
- Marquis Mathieu
- Michel Petit
- Christian Proulx
- Yves Racine
- Yves Sarault
- Jose Theodore
- Patrick Traverse
