= 2025–26 LNAH season =

This is the 2025-26 Ligue Nord-Américaine de Hockey season. This is the league's 30th season overall dating back to its' founding in 1996 as the semi-professional Quebec Semi Professional Hockey League. This is the league's 21st season under this name which it adopted for the 2004-05 season.

== Team membership changes ==
Shortly after the Laval Pétroliers won the league championship on May 2nd, a video surfaced of locker room celebration where team members were seen damaging the Gilles-Rousseau Cup, including one man performing an elbow drop on the trophy. The Petroliers released a statement acknowledging the incident and claiming no disrespect, saying the offender was a fan who had made his way into the locker room during the post-game pandemonium. They went on to say that the trophy was not the actual trophy, or even the replica that the league uses for such celebrations, but a faux trophy. This was given some level of validity when a staffer posted a picture of a pristine Gilles-Rousseau Cup poolside with the caption “the cup is intact”. As a result of the incident, the team was temporarily suspended. The league governors later issued a press release on May 29, 2026 stating that the league was going to have seven teams in the league for the 2026-27 playing season, and that the league's board of governors voted to expel and dissolve the Laval Pétroliers at the league's Annual General Meeting.

On August 1, 2026 the league announced the addition of the Manotick Mariners to the league for the 2026-27 season. The team was previously a member of the Northern Premier Hockey League.

== Teams ==
Team	City	Arena	Joined
Laval Pétroliers	Laval, Quebec	Colisée de Laval	2018*
Jonquière Marquis	Saguenay, Quebec	Palais des Sports de Saguenay	1996*/2009
National de Québec	Ancienne Lorette, Quebec	Complexe Sportif Bonair	2024
Rivière-du-Loup 3L	Rivière-du-Loup, Quebec	Centre Premier Tech	2008*/2010
Saint-Georges Cool FM 103.5	Saint-Georges, Quebec	Centre Sportif Lacroix-Dutil	1996*/2010
Bataillon de St-Hyacinthe	St. Hyacinthe, Quebec	Stade L.P. Gaucher	2024
Sorel-Tracy Éperviers	Sorel-Tracy, Quebec	Colisée Cardin	1996*/2013
Thetford Mines Assurancia	Thetford Mines, Quebec	Centre Mario Gosselin	1996*/2015

== Standings ==
Team	GP	W	L	OL	SL	GF	GA	Pts
Laval Pétroliers	36	25	11	0	0	159	134	50
Bataillon de St-Hyacinthe	36	19	12	5	0	129	129	43
Sorel-Tracy Éperviers	36	19	13	4	0	135	121	42
Saint-Georges Cool FM 103.5	36	19	13	4	0	157	141	42
Thetford Mines Assurancia	36	18	16	1	1	142	117	38
Jonquière Marquis	36	17	17	2	0	132	147	36
National de Québec	36	15	18	3	0	130	155	33
Rivière-du-Loup 3L	36	12	21	3	0	112	152	27

== Gilles-Rousseau Cup Playoffs ==
All eight teams qualify for the playoffs.

=== Quarterfinals ===
- Laval Pétroliers defeated Rivière-du-Loup 3L 4 games to 1 (4-3, 3-0, 5-4, 3-6, 7-0)
- Bataillon de St-Hyacinthe defeated National de Québec 4 games to 3 (4-3, 3-1, 3-4 (ot), 3-5, 1-2, 5-2, 6-1)
- Jonquière Marquis defeated Sorel-Tracy Éperviers 4 games to 1 (4-3, 4-3, 5-4 (ot), 1-5, 4-2)
- Thetford Mines Assurancia defeated Saint-Georges Cool FM 103.5 4 games to 3 (1-2 (ot), 6-3, 4-3, 2-4, 3-5, 6-3, 3-2 (ot))

=== Semifinals ===
- Laval Pétroliers defeated Jonquière Marquis 4 games to 2 ( 5-1, 2-3, 4-1, 1-3, 2-1, 3-1)
- Bataillon de St-Hyacinthe defeated Thetford Mines Assurancia 4 games to 1 (4-3, 1-4, 4-3, 4-1, 4-2)

=== Final ===
- Laval Pétroliers defeated Bataillon de St-Hyacinthe 4 games to none (5-4, 5-3, 2-1, 4-0)
