= 2026–27 LNAH season =

Canadian ice hockey league season

This is the 2026-27 Ligue Nord-Américaine de Hockey season. This is the league's 31st season overall dating back to its founding in 1996 as the semi-professional Quebec Semi Professional Hockey League. This is the league's 22nd season under this name which it adopted for the 2004–05 season.

== Membership Changes ==
- Shortly after the Laval Pétroliers won the league championship on May 2, a video surfaced of an unnamed man who is seen consuming beer in the video proceeded to give what appears to be the Gilles-Rousseau Cup a pro wrestling style flying elbow while the trophy was lying prone on the locker room floor flattening the cylindrical base of the trophy. As a result of the incident the team is suspended until the league's Board of Governors meeting when a final ruling is issued. The Petroliers released a statement acknowledging the incident and claiming no disrespect, saying the offender was a fan who had made his way into the locker room during the post-game pandemonium. They went on to say that the trophy was not the actual trophy, or even the replica that the league uses for such celebrations, but a faux trophy. This was given some level of validity when a staffer posted a picture of a pristine Gilles-Rousseau Cup poolside with the caption “the cup is intact”. The league issued a press release on May 29, 2026, stating that the league was going to have seven teams in the league for the 2026-27 playing season and that the league's board of governors voted to expel and dissolve the Laval Pétroliers at the league's Annual General Meeting.
- On August 1, 2026, the league announced the addition of the Manotick Mariners to the league for the 2026–27 season. The team was previously a member of the Northern Premier Hockey League.

== Teams ==
Team	City	Arena	Joined
Manotick Mariners	Manotick, Ontario	Manotick Community Centre & Mike O'Neil Arena	2024/2026
Jonquière Marquis	Saguenay, Quebec	Palais des Sports de Saguenay	1996*/2009
National de Québec	Ancienne Lorette, Quebec	Complexe Sportif Bonair	2024
Rivière-du-Loup 3L	Rivière-du-Loup, Quebec	Centre Premier Tech	2008*/2010
Saint-Georges Cool FM 103.5	Saint-Georges, Quebec	Centre Sportif Lacroix-Dutil	1996*/2010
Saint-Hyacinthe Bataillon	St. Hyacinthe, Quebec	Stade L.P. Gaucher	2024
Sorel-Tracy Éperviers	Sorel-Tracy, Quebec	Colisée Cardin	1996*/2013
Thetford Mines Assurancia	Thetford Mines, Quebec	Centre Mario Gosselin	1996*/2015

== Standings ==
to be added upon completion of the season.

== Gilles-Rousseau Cup Playoffs ==
All eight teams qualify for the playoffs.
