= Jonathan Paiement =

Canadian ice hockey player

- Born: March 7, 1985 (age 41) Montreal, Quebec, Canada
- Height: 6 ft 1 in (185 cm)
- Weight: 201 lb (91 kg; 14 st 5 lb)
- Position: Defence
- Shoots: Left
- Austria team Former teams: HC Innsbruck; AHL; Rockford IceHogs; Hershey Bears; Albany River Rats; ECHL; Texas Wildcatters; Florida Everblades; DEL; Augsburger Panther
- NHL draft: 247th overall, 2004; New York Rangers
- Playing career: 2006–present

Jonathan Paiement (born March 7, 1985) is a Canadian former professional ice hockey defenceman. Paiement was selected by the New York Rangers in the eighth round (247th overall) of the 2004 NHL entry draft.

== Amateur career ==
Paiement played major junior hockey in the Quebec Major Junior Hockey League.

== Professional career ==
Paiement's first professional season was played in the ECHL with the 2006–07 Texas Wildcatters.

On February 19, 2009, Paiement and four other people were seriously injured when the bus carrying the Albany River Rats home from a game in Lowell, Massachusetts struck a guard rail and rolled on its side on the Massachusetts Turnpike. Paiement, Nicolas Blanchard, Joe Jensen, Casey Borer, and the River Rats' radio color commentator, John Hennessy, were all taken to Berkshire Medical Center in Pittsfield with "serious" injuries.

== Awards and honours ==
Award	Year
QMJHL First team All-Star	2003–04

== Career statistics ==
			Regular season					Playoffs
Season	Team	League	GP	G	A	Pts	PIM	GP	G	A	Pts	PIM
2000–01	Lac St–Louis Lions	QMAAA	33	3	3	6	108	—	—	—	—	—
2001–02	Sherbrooke Castors	QMJHL	65	5	7	12	61	—	—	—	—	—
2002–03	Sherbrooke Castors	QMJHL	71	4	14	18	118	12	2	5	7	18
2003–04	Lewiston Maineiacs	QMJHL	68	13	52	65	140	7	0	2	2	10
2004–05	Lewiston Maineiacs	QMJHL	67	11	51	62	198	8	2	7	9	34
2005–06	Lewiston Maineiacs	QMJHL	63	16	33	49	136	4	0	2	2	31
2006–07	Texas Wildcatters	ECHL	72	6	37	43	76	10	1	2	3	13
2007–08	Texas Wildcatters	ECHL	22	3	14	17	28	—	—	—	—	—
2007–08	Rockford IceHogs	AHL	3	2	0	2	4	—	—	—	—	—
2007–08	Hershey Bears	AHL	37	2	11	13	30	5	1	0	1	6
2008–09	Albany River Rats	AHL	45	1	11	12	38	—	—	—	—	—
2008–09	Florida Everblades	ECHL	9	3	6	9	10	11	0	2	2	11
2009–10	Albany River Rats	AHL	73	4	21	25	34	—	—	—	—	—
2010–11	Augsburger Panther	DEL	52	5	9	14	28	—	—	—	—	—
2011–12	HC TWK Innsbruck	AUT.2	32	13	22	35	81	10	5	7	12	18
2012–13	Jonquière Marquis	LNAH	40	4	26	30	36	11	4	3	7	12
2013–14	Jonquière Marquis	LNAH	33	5	12	17	55	17	5	8	13	36
2014–15	Jonquière Marquis	LNAH	38	8	30	38	86	9	3	3	6	26
2015–16	Jonquière Marquis	LNAH	40	7	19	26	82	11	1	4	5	24
2016–17	Jonquière Marquis	LNAH	37	7	16	23	42	15	4	5	9	35
2017–18	Jonquière Marquis	LNAH	35	4	12	16	53	5	0	1	1	4
2018–19	Les Pétroliers du Nord	LNAH	36	1	8	9	69	4	0	0	0	8
2019–20	Rivière–du–Loup 3L	LNAH	18	0	1	1	8	—	—	—	—	—
2021–22	Sorel–Tracy Éperviers	LNAH	12	0	0	0	18	10	0	0	0	8
AHL totals			158	9	43	52	106	5	1	0	1	6
LNAH totals			289	36	124	160	449	82	17	24	41	153
