= Patrick Bordeleau =

Canadian ice hockey player (born 1986)

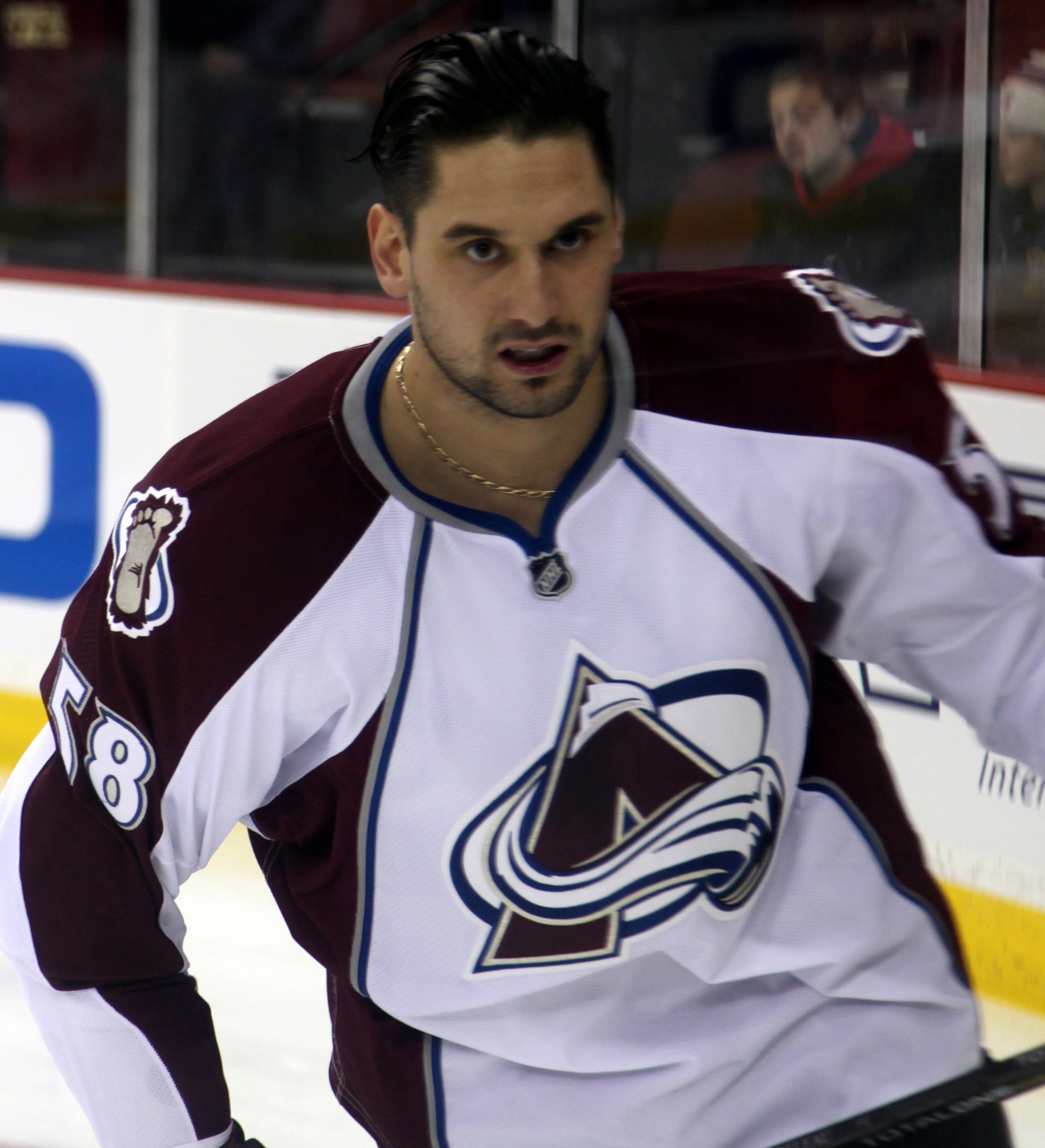
- Bordeleau in February 2014.
- Born: March 23, 1986 (age 40) Montreal, Quebec, Canada
- Height: 6 ft 6 in (198 cm)
- Weight: 225 lb (102 kg; 16 st 1 lb)
- Position: Left wing
- Shoots: Left
- LNAH team Former teams: Laval Pétroliers; Colorado Avalanche; Cardiff Devils
- NHL draft: 114th overall, 2004; Minnesota Wild
- Playing career: 2007–present

Patrick Bordeleau (born March 23, 1986) is a Canadian professional ice hockey left winger who currently plays for the Laval Pétroliers in the Ligue Nord-Américaine de Hockey (LNAH). He previously played in the National Hockey League (NHL) with the Colorado Avalanche.

== Playing career ==
As a youth, Bordeleau played in the 1999 Quebec International Pee-Wee Hockey Tournament with the Beauval Tourbillon minor ice hockey team.

Bordeleau originally started his junior career in the Quebec Major Junior Hockey League with the Val-d'Or Foreurs, he was the 4th Round choice (114th overall) for the Minnesota Wild in 2004 NHL entry draft.

Unsigned from the Wild, he turned professional during the 2007–08 season after leaving St. Thomas University in New Brunswick after only one game. He signed on a try-out with the Charlotte Checkers of the ECHL and played 10 games before moving on to a brief stint with the Wheeling Nailers before settling with the Pensacola Ice Pilots to finish out the season.

In the following 2008–09 season, he initially remained in the ECHL signing with the Augusta Lynx. On December 5, 2008, he was signed by the Albany River Rats of the American Hockey League where he played six games with two assists before he was later released.

After he was traded to fellow ECHL team, the Florida Everblades on January 5, 2009, he was recalled to the AHL and signed a try-out with the Springfield Falcons where he played four games until he was returned to the Everblades January 19, 2009. Patrick played in 29 games for the Everblades posting 13 points and 81 Penalty minutes while coinciding with two further brief appearances in the AHL with the Lake Erie Monsters and the Milwaukee Admirals. At the conclusion of the season, Bordeleau had played with 6 different teams over two leagues and compiled a total of 15 games within the AHL.

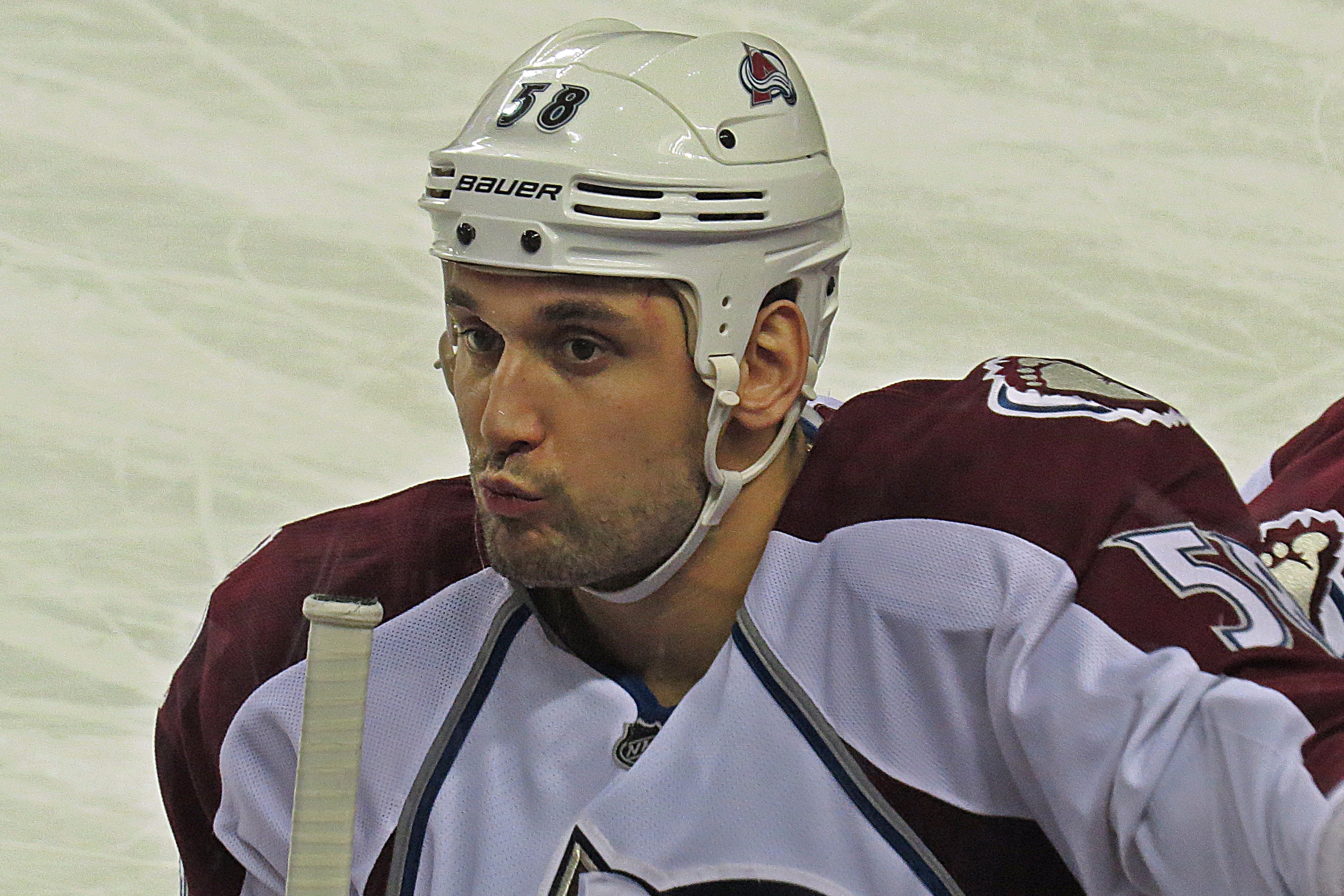
Bordeleau in 2013.

In the 2009–10 season, Bordeleau signed an AHL contract to return to Lake Erie, and alongside fellow enforcer Josh Aspinland, Bordeleau carried the duties with his notable size as the Monsters enforcer. He played a professional high 60 games and recorded 106 penalty minutes to mark his first professional season in which he remained with the one team.

Upon re-signing with the Monsters prior to the 2010–11 season, Patrick was invited on a try-out to the Monsters National Hockey League affiliate, the Colorado Avalanche, training camp on September 15, 2010. Bordeleau continued with the Avalanche throughout the pre-season and impressed to score a goal against the Dallas Stars in a 2–1 defeat on September 24, 2010. With an injury to Avalanche enforcer, David Kočí, Bordeleau remained until he was among the final cuts for Colorado's opening night roster and returned to Lake Erie on October 3, 2010. Bordeleau remained with the Monsters for the duration of the season, and recorded career high 12 points in 72 games. On January 20, 2011, Bordeleau broke Lake Erie's franchise record for most penalty minutes which was previously 213 set by Mitch Love in 2007–08.

On June 9, 2011, he was signed to his first NHL contract with a one-year, two-way contract with the Colorado Avalanche of the NHL. After an early cut in the following Avalanche training camp, Bordeleau was again entrusted as the Monsters enforcer for the 2011–12 season, legitimizing himself as one of the AHL's premier heavyweights.

Bordeleau was re-signed by the Avalanche to a one-year contract on June 16, 2012. With the 2012–13 NHL lock-out in effect he was assigned directly to the Monsters. In returning for his fifth season, he became the Monsters longest tenured player in franchise history. After 29 games with Lake Erie, he was recalled to attend the Avalanche training camp upon the lifting of the Lockout. Bordeleau was subsequently included in the Avalanche opening night roster for the 2012–13 season. On January 19, 2013, he made his NHL debut on the fourth line against the team that drafted him, the Minnesota Wild, in a 4–2 defeat. Bordeleau featured in 46 of 48 games with the Avalanche, as the teams enforcer he led the club in hits with 116 and finished second in penalty minutes. He scored his first NHL goal on April 11, 2013, against the Los Angeles Kings in a 3–2 shootout defeat.

On June 5, 2013, Bordeleau was signed to a three-year contract extension to remain with the Avalanche. In the following 2013–14 season, he would appear in all 82 games and posted a career high 6 goals and 11 points, whilst leading the team in hits for a second consecutive season.

In the 2014–15 season, Bordeleau's streak of 102 games played with Colorado would come to a halt after it was revealed Bordeleau received off-season back surgery and was expected to miss the opening three months of the campaign. After missing the first 31 games of the season, Bordeleau was activated and made his season debut against the Buffalo Sabres on December 20, 2014. During the contest Bordeleau suffered a fractured kneecap which ruled him out from the remainder of the season.

At the conclusion of his contract, having not appeared with the Avalanche in the 2015–16 season, Bordeleau left as a free agent. On August 24, 2016, Bordeleau opted to sign abroad, agreeing to a one-year deal for the 2016–17 season with Welsh club, the Cardiff Devils of the EIHL. After one season in the EIHL, Bordeleau signed a one-year contract to play with Saint-Georges of the LNAH.

== Personal ==
Following struggles with the breakdown of his marriage and gambling debts post NHL career, Bordeleau was arrested and detained in Bordeaux Prison, on February 18, 2020. He was later sentenced to five months and 160 hours of community service for defrauding his ex stepfather-in-law of $63,000. He also pleaded guilty to criminal harassment and breach of condition.

== Career statistics ==
			Regular season					Playoffs
Season	Team	League	GP	G	A	Pts	PIM	GP	G	A	Pts	PIM
2002–03	Gatineau L'Intrépide	QMAAA	39	8	13	21	50	—	—	—	—	—
2003–04	Val–d'Or Foreurs	QMJHL	68	7	11	18	97	7	1	1	2	8
2004–05	Val–d'Or Foreurs	QMJHL	63	14	24	38	51	—	—	—	—	—
2005–06	Val–d'Or Foreurs	QMJHL	67	23	33	56	87	5	1	0	1	7
2006–07	Weyburn Red Wings	SJHL	8	4	3	7	34	—	—	—	—	—
2006–07	Valleyfield Braves	QJAHL	8	2	6	8	26	—	—	—	—	—
2006–07	Drummondville Voltigeurs	QMJHL	3	0	2	2	6	—	—	—	—	—
2006–07	Acadie–Bathurst Titan	QMJHL	17	7	12	19	26	—	—	—	—	—
2007–08	St. Thomas University	AUS	1	0	0	0	0	—	—	—	—	—
2007–08	Charlotte Checkers	ECHL	10	1	2	3	11	—	—	—	—	—
2007–08	Wheeling Nailers	ECHL	3	0	1	1	0	—	—	—	—	—
2007–08	Pensacola Ice Pilots	ECHL	38	7	11	18	60	—	—	—	—	—
2008–09	Augusta Lynx	ECHL	18	4	6	10	57	—	—	—	—	—
2008–09	Albany River Rats	AHL	6	0	2	2	21	—	—	—	—	—
2008–09	Florida Everblades	ECHL	29	4	9	13	81	—	—	—	—	—
2008–09	Springfield Falcons	AHL	4	0	0	0	4	—	—	—	—	—
2008–09	Lake Erie Monsters	AHL	3	0	1	1	17	—	—	—	—	—
2008–09	Milwaukee Admirals	AHL	2	0	0	0	0	—	—	—	—	—
2009–10	Lake Erie Monsters	AHL	60	1	2	3	106	—	—	—	—	—
2010–11	Lake Erie Monsters	AHL	72	2	10	12	125	7	0	0	0	6
2011–12	Lake Erie Monsters	AHL	52	4	4	8	96	—	—	—	—	—
2012–13	Lake Erie Monsters	AHL	29	2	5	7	91	—	—	—	—	—
2012–13	Colorado Avalanche	NHL	46	2	3	5	70	—	—	—	—	—
2013–14	Colorado Avalanche	NHL	82	6	5	11	115	7	0	0	0	10
2014–15	Colorado Avalanche	NHL	1	0	0	0	0	—	—	—	—	—
2015–16	San Antonio Rampage	AHL	55	0	5	5	72	—	—	—	—	—
2016–17	Cardiff Devils	EIHL	49	5	5	10	64	4	0	0	0	0
2017–18	Saint–Georges Cool FM 103.5	LNAH	5	4	0	4	2	—	—	—	—	—
2018–19	Sorel–Tracy Éperviers	LNAH	4	0	2	2	2	—	—	—	—	—
2018–19	Les Pétroliers du Nord	LNAH	20	5	7	12	78	4	0	1	1	4
2019–20	Les Pétroliers du Nord	LNAH	27	4	11	15	103	—	—	—	—	—
2021–22	Les Pétroliers du Nord	LNAH	5	3	1	4	14	13	1	2	3	21
2022–23	Jonquière Marquis	LNAH	15	1	1	2	66	6	0	0	0	12
2023–24	Jonquiere Marquis	LNAH	25	0	2	2	109	7	0	2	2	6
2024–25	Jonquière Marquis	LNAH	25	0	1	1	73	—	—	—	—	—
2025–26	Jonquiere Marquis	LNAH	17	0	0	0	62	—	—	—	—	—
2025–26	Laval Pétroliers	LNAH	12	0	1	1	48	13	0	0	0	34
NHL totals			129	8	8	16	185	7	0	0	0	10
