= Gilles Bouchard =

Canadian ice hockey coach (born 1971)

- Born: February 28, 1971 (age 55); Normandin, Quebec, Canada
- Education: Université du Québec à Trois-Rivières
- Occupation: Ice hockey coach
- Employer: Sherbrooke Phoenix
- Awards: Brian Kilrea Coach of the Year Award (2016)

Gilles Bouchard (born February 28, 1971) is a Canadian ice hockey coach with the Sherbrooke Phoenix in the Quebec Major Junior Hockey League (QMJHL) He previously coached the Rouyn-Noranda Huskies in the QMJHL for five seasons. He also served as an assistant coach with the Syracuse Crunch of the American Hockey League (AHL) for five seasons. In the 2015–16 QMJHL season, he led the Huskies to the Jean Rougeau Trophy as regular season champions, the President's Cup as playoffs champions, and reached the final in the 2016 Memorial Cup. After that season, Bouchard was awarded the Ron Lapointe Trophy as the QMJHL Coach of the Year, the Maurice Filion Trophy as the QMJHL Executive of the Year, and the Brian Kilrea Coach of the Year Award for the Canadian Hockey League.

== Early life ==
Gilles Bouchard was born on February 28, 1971, in Normandin, Quebec, and grew up on the local family farm.

== Playing career ==
Bouchard played three seasons as a winger in the Quebec Major Junior Hockey League (QMJHL) from 1988 to 1991, with the Shawinigan Cataractes, the Trois-Rivières Draveurs, the Beauport Harfangs, and the Chicoutimi Saguenéens. He was traded to Chicoutimi partway through the 1990–91 QMJHL season, and played in the 1991 Memorial Cup under coach Jos Canale. After junior hockey, he played two seasons for the Université du Québec à Trois-Rivières (UQTR), then later played four seasons in the Quebec Semi-Pro Hockey League.

Season-by-season career playing statistics.			Regular Season					Playoffs
Season	Team	League	GP	G	A	Pts	PIM	GP	G	A	Pts	PIM
1988–89	Shawinigan Cataractes	QMJHL	30	0	0	0	4	—	—	—	—	—
1988–89	Trois-Rivières Draveurs	QMJHL	30	3	1	4	2	4	0	0	0	0
1989–90	Trois-Rivières Draveurs	QMJHL	68	12	15	27	46	7	0	2	2	2
1990–91	Beauport Harfangs	QMJHL	56	21	36	57	40	—	—	—	—	—
1990–91	Chicoutimi Saguenéens	QMJHL	13	1	4	5	4	17	4	4	8	4
1996–97	Louiseville Jets	QSPHL	24	9	16	25	17	—	—	—	—	—
1997–98	Asbestos Aztecs	QSPHL	7	2	9	11	2	—	—	—	—	—
1998–99	Thetford Mines Coyotes	QSPHL	5	5	1	6	0	—	—	—	—	—
1999–2000	Thetford Mines Coyotes	QSPHL	9	1	3	4	8	1	0	0	0	0
QMJHL Totals			197	37	56	93	96	28	4	6	10	6
QSPHL Totals			45	17	29	46	27	1	0	0	0	0

== Coaching career ==
=== Early years ===
Bouchard coached AAA midget hockey from 1998 to 2012. He spent four seasons with the Trois-Rivières Estacades as an assistant coach from 1998 to 2002, two seasons as the head coach of the Bois-Francs Cascades Espoir from 2002 to 2004, and eight seasons as head coach of the Trois-Rivières Estacades from 2004 to 2012. He did not pursue coaching at a higher level sooner due to a desire to stay closer to his family, and establish a teaching position in charge of AAA midget and sport studies. Bouchard served as head coach of the UQTR Patriotes for the 2012–13 Canadian Interuniversity Sport season. He successfully rebuilt the Patriotes, and led the team to its first Queen's Cup championship since 2007, with a five-game victory over the Waterloo Warriors.

=== Rouyn-Noranda Huskies ===
Bouchard served as head coach and general manager of the Rouyn-Noranda Huskies in the Quebec Major Junior Hockey League for five seasons from 2013–14 to 2017–18. He succeeded André Tourigny for the 2013–14 QMJHL season. Bouchard felt that his background coaching midget hockey helped him quickly adapt to the QMJHL. He led the Huskies to fifth place in the west division, and tenth overall in the regular season. In the playoffs, the Huskies defeated the Quebec Remparts four games to one in the first round, then lost in four games to the Baie-Comeau Drakkar in the second round. In the 2014–15 QMJHL season, Bouchard led the Huskies to fourth place in west division, and eleventh overall in the regular season. The Huskies lost to the Val-d'Or Foreurs in six games in the first round of the playoffs.

Bouchard led the Huskies to 113 points in the 2015–16 QMJHL season, winning the Jean Rougeau Trophy as the top team in the QMJHL. In the playoffs, the Huskies defeated the Drummondville Voltigeurs in four games in the first round, defeated the Blainville-Boisbriand Armada in five games in round two, defeated the Moncton Wildcats in six games in round three, then defeated the Shawinigan Cataractes in five games in the finals. The playoff victory was the first President's Cup for the Huskies, and qualified the team for the Memorial Cup. Bouchard was awarded the Maurice Filion Trophy as the QMJHL general manager of the year, and the Ron Lapointe Trophy as the QMHL coach of the year. He was the first person in the league's history to win both awards in the same season.

Bouchard led the Huskies to the 2016 Memorial Cup, and defeated the Brandon Wheat Kings by a 5–3 score in game one. The Huskies lost game two to the Red Deer Rebels by a 5–2 score, and lost game three to the London Knights by the same 5–2 score. In the cup semifinals, the Huskies pulled out a 3–1 win over Red Deer to reach the championship game. The Huskies were tied 2–2 with London after regulation time in the Memorial Cup final, but lost in overtime. After the Memorial Cup, Bouchard was awarded the Brian Kilrea Coach of the Year Award as the top overall coach in the Canadian Hockey League.

Bouchard led the Huskies to another first-place finish in the west division for the 2016–17 QMJHL season, and second overall in the QMJHL. In the playoffs, the Huskies defeated the Halifax Mooseheads four games to two in the first round, then lost to the Chicoutimi Saguenéens in seven games in round two. In the 2017–18 QMJHL season, the Huskies placed third in the west division and seventh overall in the league, but lost to the Sherbrooke Phoenix in seven games in the first round of the playoffs. During the 2018 playoffs, Bouchard was fined $1,000 by the QMJHL for inappropriate statements to the media, in which he brought an injured played with a bloody nose to a post-game press conference. In five seasons and 340 regular season games, Bouchard won 204 games as head coach of the Huskies.

=== National team duties ===
Bouchard coached for Hockey Canada three times with the under-17 team. He was an assistant coach with Canada Red at the 2014 World U-17 Hockey Challenge, an assistant coach with Canada White which won the gold medal at the 2015 World U-17 Hockey Challenge, and was the head coach of Canada Red which won the silver medal at the 2017 World U-17 Hockey Challenge. Bouchard was selected to be head coach for the Canada men's national under-18 ice hockey team at the Hlinka Gretzky Cup in 2018. He resigned as head coach when hired to coach professional hockey.

=== Syracuse Crunch ===
On June 26, 2018, Bouchard was announced as an assistant coach to Benoit Groulx on the Syracuse Crunch in the American Hockey League, replacing Jeff Halpern. Bouchard was signed to a three-year contract by Tampa Bay Lightning general manager Julien BriseBois in the week following the 2018 NHL Entry Draft.

=== Sherbrooke Phoenix ===
In July 2023, Bouchard was named head coach of the Sherbrooke Phoenix in the Quebec Major Junior Hockey League (QMJHL).

=== Coaching record ===
Season-by-season coaching statistics:

Season	Team	League	GP	W	L	OTL	SL	Points	Pct	Standing	Playoffs
2013–14	Rouyn-Noranda Huskies	QMJHL	68	35	28	3	2	75	0.551	5th, west	Lost, round 2
2014–15	Rouyn-Noranda Huskies	QMJHL	68	33	30	4	1	71	0.522	4th, west	Lost, round 1
2015–16	Rouyn-Noranda Huskies	QMJHL	68	54	9	3	2	113	0.831	1st, west	Won President's Cup; 2016 Memorial Cup finalists
2016–17	Rouyn-Noranda Huskies	QMJHL	68	43	18	2	5	93	0.684	1st, west	Lost, round 2
2017–18	Rouyn-Noranda Huskies	QMJHL	68	39	19	7	3	88	0.647	3rd, west	Lost, round 1
QMJHL TOTALS			340	204	104	19	13	440	0.647	2 divisions	1 championship

== Personal life ==
Bouchard's son Xavier Bouchard, was drafted by the Vegas Golden Knights in the sixth round of the 2018 NHL entry draft. Bouchard briefly coached his son at the AAA midget level.
