= James Desmarais =

Canadian ice hockey player (born 1979)

- Born: May 4, 1979 (age 47) Montreal, Quebec, Canada
- Height: 5 ft 10 in (178 cm)
- Weight: 174 lb (79 kg; 12 st 6 lb)
- Position: Centre
- Shoots: Right
- Played for: Worcester IceCats; Peoria Rivermen; B.C. Icemen; Springfield Falcons; Arkansas RiverBlades; Reading Royals; Dayton Bombers; Greensboro Generals; Alleghe Hockey; Adirondack IceHawks; Granby Prédateurs; Verdun Dragons; HC TWK Innsbruck; HC Ajoie; EHC Black Wings Linz; EHC Biel; SC Rapperswil-Jona Lakers; EHC Visp; Belfast Giants; Jonquière Marquis; Les Pétroliers du Nord
- NHL draft: 270th overall, 1999; St. Louis Blues
- Playing career: 1999–present

James Desmarais (born May 4, 1979) is a Canadian professional ice hockey player.

Desmarais was selected by the St. Louis Blues in the 9th round (270th overall) of the 1999 NHL entry draft. Though he never played in the National Hockey League, he played for several teams in the minor leagues such as the American Hockey League and the ECHL as well as for teams in Italy, Austria, Switzerland and the United Kingdom. In Switzerland, he played for HC Ajoie from 2006 to 2013. In 2015, he signed for the Belfast Giants in the Elite Ice Hockey League and remained until 2017.

== Career statistics ==
			Regular season					Playoffs
Season	Team	League	GP	G	A	Pts	PIM	GP	G	A	Pts	PIM
1994–95	Lac St-Louis Lions	QMAAA	1	0	0	0	2	—	—	—	—	—
1995–96	Lac St-Louis Lions	QMAAA	44	19	23	42	42	11	6	8	14	—
1996–97	Laval Titan	QMJHL	67	12	21	33	34	3	0	0	0	4
1997–98	Laval Titan	QMJHL	68	33	40	73	56	15	6	5	11	12
1998–99	Rouyn-Noranda Huskies	QMJHL	66	62	73	135	127	11	6	7	13	14
1999–00	Worcester IceCats	AHL	8	0	2	2	0	—	—	—	—	—
1999–00	Peoria Rivermen	ECHL	59	26	33	59	51	—	—	—	—	—
2000–01	B.C. Icemen	UHL	33	17	23	40	18	—	—	—	—	—
2000–01	Springfield Falcons	AHL	37	8	16	24	6	—	—	—	—	—
2001–02	Arkansas RiverBlades	ECHL	4	1	3	4	0	—	—	—	—	—
2001–02	Reading Royals	ECHL	16	7	8	15	8	—	—	—	—	—
2001–02	Dayton Bombers	ECHL	17	3	4	7	6	—	—	—	—	—
2001–02	Greensboro Generals	ECHL	31	5	11	16	39	—	—	—	—	—
2002–03	HC Alleghe	Italy	40	16	23	39	38	—	—	—	—	—
2003–04	Springfield Falcons	AHL	2	0	0	0	4	—	—	—	—	—
2003–04	Adirondack IceHawks	UHL	37	21	35	56	12	—	—	—	—	—
2003–04	Granby Prédateurs	QSPHL	31	23	29	52	32	—	—	—	—	—
2004–05	Verdun Dragons	LNAH	57	51	61	112	75	—	—	—	—	—
2005–06	HC Innsbruck	EBEL	48	32	34	66	99	7	3	5	8	22
2006–07	HC Ajoie	NLB	44	40	52	92	127	6	5	8	13	10
2006–07	EHC Linz	EBEL	9	3	7	10	12	3	0	6	6	2
2007–08	HC Ajoie	NLB	49	42	54	96	74	14	13	16	29	48
2008–09	HC Ajoie	NLB	47	35	55	90	70	10	6	11	17	35
2009–10	HC Ajoie	NLB	45	35	49	84	121	7	5	4	9	14
2010–11	HC Ajoie	NLB	27	20	20	40	60	7	2	3	5	4
2011–12	HC Ajoie	NLB	38	16	24	40	70	7	4	3	7	8
2012–13	HC Ajoie	NLB	50	26	58	84	109	9	3	7	10	6
2013–14	HC Ajoie	NLB	2	0	1	1	0	—	—	—	—	—
2013–14	EHC Visp	NLB	19	11	13	24	12	18	6	20	26	24
2014–15	EHC Visp	NLB	48	24	44	68	32	4	0	1	1	10
2015–16	Belfast Giants	EIHL	52	21	31	52	46	2	0	0	0	0
2016–17	Belfast Giants	EIHL	47	16	32	48	36	3	0	2	2	0
2017–18	Jonquiere Marquis	LNAH	34	26	18	44	46	5	1	5	6	8
2018–19	Jonquiere Marquis	LNAH	10	5	8	13	12	—	—	—	—	—
2018–19	Les Pétroliers du Nord	LNAH	12	3	4	7	9	2	0	0	0	2
2019–20	Les Pétroliers du Nord	LNAH	22	8	15	23	22	—	—	—	—	—
2019–20	Jonquiere Marquis	LNAH	4	1	4	5	2	—	—	—	—	—
2021–22	Jonquiere Marquis	LNAH	1	0	0	0	0	—	—	—	—	—
NLB totals			369	249	370	619	675	82	44	73	117	159
LNAH totals			171	117	139	256	198	2	0	0	0	2
ECHL totals			127	42	59	101	104	—	—	—	—	—
AHL totals			47	8	18	26	10	—	—	—	—	—
