= 1997–98 QSPHL season =

Canadian ice hockey league season

The 1997–98 QSPHL season was the second season of the Quebec Semi-Pro Hockey League, a minor professional league in the Canadian province of Quebec. 14 teams participated in the regular season, and the Rapides de Lachute won the league title.

== Regular season ==
Division Est	GP	W	L	OTL	GF	GA	Pts
Grand Portneuf de Pont-Rouge	38	32	5	1	216	120	65
Coyotes de Thetford Mines	38	20	15	3	184	158	43
Chacals de la Rive-Sud	38	17	19	2	181	191	36
As de Québec	38	16	21	1	210	249	33
Condors de Jonquière	38	11	23	4	154	210	26

Division Centrale	GP	W	L	OTL	GF	GA	Pts
Nova d'Acton Vale	38	26	10	2	217	161	54
Blitz de Granby	38	24	13	1	214	186	49
Papetiers de Windsor	38	15	21	2	168	231	32
Aztèques d'Asbestos	38	13	20	5	158	218	31

Division Ouest	GP	W	L	OTL	GF	GA	Pts
Blizzard de Saint-Gabriel	38	27	9	2	216	159	56
Rapides de Lachute	38	25	11	2	211	177	52
Chiefs de Sainte-Thérèse	38	14	18	6	175	194	34
Dinosaures de Sorel	38	14	21	3	164	195	31
Dragons d'Iberville	38	12	25	1	145	174	25

== Coupe Futura-Playoffs ==
Coupe Futura-1/8 Finals
C1	Nova d'Acton Vale	4
C4	Aztèques d'Asbestos	1
E2	Coyotes de Thetford Mines	4
E3	Chacals de la Rive-Sud	0
O1	Blizzard de Saint-Gabriel	4
O4	Dinosaures de Sorel	0
E1	Grand Portneuf de Pont-Rouge	4
E4	As de Québec	0
O2	Rapides de Lachute	4
O3	Chiefs de Sainte-Thérèse	3
C2	Blitz de Granby	4
C3	Papetiers de Windsor	3

Coupe Futura-Quarterfinals
C1	Nova d'Acton Vale	4
E2	Coyotes de Thetford Mines	1
O1	Blizzard de Saint-Gabriel
Freilos
E1	Grand Portneuf de Pont-Rouge
Freilos
O2	Rapides de Lachute	4
C2	Blitz de Granby	2

Coupe Futura-Semifinals
C1	Nova d'Acton Vale	4
O1	Blizzard de Saint-Gabriel	2
E1	Grand Portneuf de Pont-Rouge	3
O2	Rapides de Lachute	4

Coupe Futura-Final
C1	Nova d'Acton Vale	2
O2	Rapides de Lachute	4
