= Pierre Lacroix (ice hockey, born 1959) =

Canadian ice hockey player

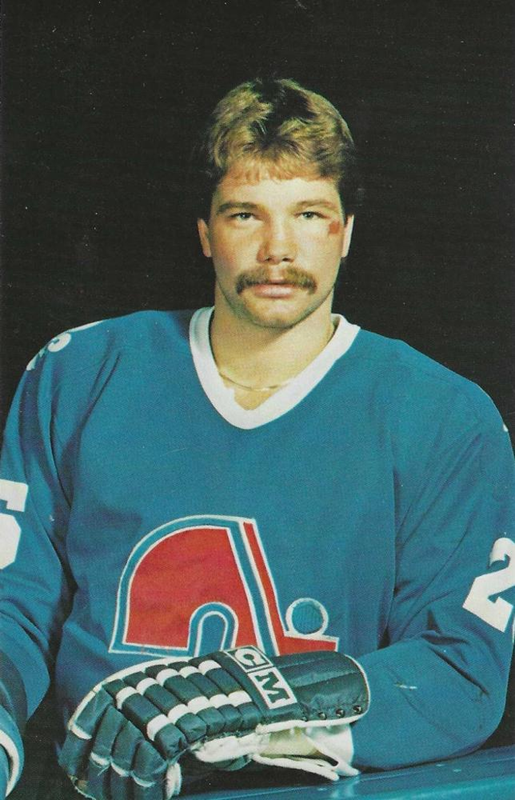
- Lacroix in 1981
- Born: April 11, 1959 (age 67) Sainte-Foy, Quebec, Canada
- Height: 5 ft 11 in (180 cm)
- Weight: 185 lb (84 kg; 13 st 3 lb)
- Position: Defence
- Shot: Left
- Played for: Quebec Nordiques; Hartford Whalers
- NHL draft: 104th overall, 1979; Quebec Nordiques
- Playing career: 1979–1993

Pierre Lacroix (born April 11, 1959) is a Canadian former professional ice hockey defenceman who played 274 National Hockey League games for the Quebec Nordiques and the Hartford Whalers. He is the father of Maxime Lacroix. As a youth, he played in the 1971 Quebec International Pee-Wee Hockey Tournament with a minor ice hockey team from Sainte-Foy.

== Career statistics ==
			Regular season					Playoffs
Season	Team	League	GP	G	A	Pts	PIM	GP	G	A	Pts	PIM
1975–76	Quebec Remparts	QMJHL	72	7	30	37	90	15	3	7	10	14
1975–76	Quebec Remparts	MC	—	—	—	—	—	3	0	1	1	2
1976–77	Quebec Remparts	QMJHL	69	10	43	53	61	14	3	8	11	4
1977–78	Quebec Remparts	QMJHL	38	11	30	41	35	—	—	—	—	—
1977–78	Trois–Rivières Draveurs	QMJHL	30	6	24	30	20	5	3	5	8	4
1977–78	Trois–Rivières Draveurs	MC	—	—	—	—	—	4	0	3	3	2
1978–79	Trois–Rivières Draveurs	QMJHL	72	37	100	137	57	13	2	10	12	6
1978–79	Trois–Rivières Draveurs	MC	—	—	—	—	—	4	0	4	4	6
1979–80	Quebec Nordiques	NHL	76	9	21	30	45	—	—	—	—	—
1980–81	Quebec Nordiques	NHL	61	5	34	39	54	5	0	2	2	10
1981–82	Quebec Nordiques	NHL	68	4	23	27	74	3	0	0	0	0
1982–83	Quebec Nordiques	NHL	13	0	5	5	6	—	—	—	—	—
1982–83	Fredericton Express	AHL	6	0	5	5	0	—	—	—	—	—
1982–83	Hartford Whalers	NHL	56	6	25	31	18	—	—	—	—	—
1985–86	EHC Arosa	NDA	15	5	10	15	8	—	—	—	—	—
1986–87	Canada	Intl.	2	0	0	0	0	—	—	—	—	—
1987–88	HC Fribourg–Gottéron	NDA	35	8	14	22	36	—	—	—	—	—
1988–89	HC Fribourg–Gottéron	NDA	28	11	12	23	16	2	0	1	1	6
1989–90	Ours de Villard–de–Lans	FRA	35	7	32	39	22	—	—	—	—	—
1990–91	ASG Tours	FRA	7	5	5	10	10	—	—	—	—	—
1991–92	OHC Paris–Viry	FRA	33	5	17	22	26	—	—	—	—	—
1992–93	OHC Paris–Viry	FRA.2	—	—	—	—	—	—	—	—	—	—
1996–97	Windsor Papetiers	QSPHL	9	1	1	2	93	—	—	—	—	—
1998–99	Asbestos Aztèques	QSPHL	15	1	1	2	86	—	—	—	—	—
1999–2000	Asbestos Aztèques	QSPHL	2	0	0	0	4	—	—	—	—	—
NHL totals			274	24	107	131	197	8	0	2	2	10
NDA totals			78	24	36	60	60	2	0	1	1	6
FRA totals			75	17	54	71	58	—	—	—	—	—

Preceded by Bobby Smith	CHL Player of the Year; 1979	Succeeded by Doug Wickenheiser
