= Éric Houde =

Canadian ice hockey player

- Born: December 19, 1976 (age 49) Montreal, Quebec, Canada
- Height: 5 ft 11 in (180 cm)
- Weight: 191 lb (87 kg; 13 st 9 lb)
- Position: Centre
- Shot: Left
- Played for: Montreal Canadiens
- NHL draft: 216th overall, 1995; Montreal Canadiens
- Playing career: 1996–2012

Éric Pierre Joseph Houde (born December 19, 1976) is a Canadian former professional ice hockey player who played 30 games in the National Hockey League for the Montreal Canadiens. He is an assistant coach for PWHL Montreal.

== Career ==
Houde was drafted 216th overall by the Montreal Canadiens in the 1995 NHL entry draft and made his debut for the team during the 1996–97 NHL season, playing 13 games for Montreal. He would play 17 more games over two seasons for a total of 30 games, scoring two goals and three assists for five points. Over the next two seasons, Houde had spells in the American Hockey League for the Hamilton Bulldogs and Springfield Falcons and the International Hockey League for the Utah Grizzlies and the Chicago Wolves.

In 2001, Houde moved to Italy's Serie A for Asiago and then moved to Germany's Deutsche Eishockey Liga in 2002 with the SERC Wild Wings. He returned to Quebec in 2003, signing for the Verdun Dragons of the Quebec Semi-Pro Hockey League before returning to Europe, joining Swiss Nationalliga B side SC Langenthal.

In 2004, Houde returned to Germany, spending three seasons in the 2nd Bundesliga for the Essen Mosquitoes and the Landshut Cannibals. He moved to France in 2007 with Dragons de Rouen.

== Career statistics ==
			Regular season					Playoffs
Season	Team	League	GP	G	A	Pts	PIM	GP	G	A	Pts	PIM
1992–93	Saint–Hubert Selects	QMAAA	35	45	40	85	—	—	—	—	—	—
1992–93	Richelieu Riverains	QMAAA	14	3	2	5	0	—	—	—	—	—
1993–94	Saint–Jean Lynx	QMJHL	71	16	16	32	14	5	1	1	2	4
1994–95	Saint–Jean Lynx	QMJHL	40	10	13	23	23	—	—	—	—	—
1994–95	Halifax Mooseheads	QMJHL	28	13	23	36	8	3	2	1	3	4
1995–96	Halifax Mooseheads	QMJHL	69	40	48	88	35	6	3	4	7	2
1996–97	Montreal Canadiens	NHL	13	0	2	2	2	—	—	—	—	—
1996–97	Fredericton Canadiens	AHL	66	30	36	66	20	—	—	—	—	—
1997–98	Montreal Canadiens	NHL	9	1	0	1	0	—	—	—	—	—
1997–98	Fredericton Canadiens	AHL	71	28	42	70	24	4	5	2	7	4
1998–99	Montreal Canadiens	NHL	8	1	1	2	2	—	—	—	—	—
1998–99	Fredericton Canadiens	AHL	69	27	37	64	32	14	2	7	9	4
1999–2000	Hamilton Bulldogs	AHL	18	3	4	7	10	—	—	—	—	—
1999–2000	Springfield Falcons	AHL	57	28	34	62	43	5	2	2	4	2
2000–01	Utah Grizzlies	IHL	34	2	13	15	18	—	—	—	—	—
2000–01	Chicago Wolves	IHL	30	2	4	6	10	1	0	0	0	0
2001–02	HC Asiago	ITA	30	25	22	47	26	4	1	2	3	4
2002–03	SERC Wild Wings	DEL	52	9	17	26	60	—	—	—	—	—
2003–04	Verdun Dragons	QSMHL	29	20	30	50	20	22	14	27	41	12
2003–04	SC Langenthal	SUI.2	18	6	9	15	26	—	—	—	—	—
2004–05	Moskitos Essen	GER.2	51	25	50	75	75	—	—	—	—	—
2005–06	Moskitos Essen	GER.2	51	23	32	55	97	—	—	—	—	—
2006–07	Landshut Cannibals	GER.2	52	16	20	36	72	8	1	1	2	12
2007–08	Dragons de Rouen	FRA	26	9	21	30	20	9	2	4	6	38
2008–09	Saint–Hyacinthe Chiefs	LNAH	5	1	1	2	0	—	—	—	—	—
2009–10	Sorel–Tracy GCI	LNAH	11	5	9	14	4	—	—	—	—	—
2010–11	Sorel–Tracy Carvena HC	LNAH	24	4	9	13	10	—	—	—	—	—
NHL totals			30	2	3	5	4	—	—	—	—	—
AHL totals			281	116	153	269	129	23	9	11	20	10
GER.2 totals			154	64	102	166	244	8	1	1	2	12
