= Jacques Mailhot =

Canadian ice hockey player (1961–2025)

- Born: December 5, 1961 Shawinigan, Quebec, Canada
- Died: October 2025 (aged 63)
- Height: 6 ft 3 in (191 cm)
- Weight: 220 lb (100 kg; 15 st 10 lb)
- Position: Right wing
- Shot: Left
- Played for: Quebec Nordiques
- NHL draft: Undrafted
- Playing career: 1987–2000

Jacques Mailhot (December 5, 1961 – October 2025) was a Canadian professional ice hockey player who played five games in the National Hockey League (NHL) with the Quebec Nordiques during the 1988–89 season. The rest of his career, which lasted from 1987 to 2000, was spent in various minor leagues. Mailhot died in October 2025, at the age of 63.

== Career statistics ==
=== Regular season and playoffs ===
			Regular season					Playoffs
Season	Team	League	GP	G	A	Pts	PIM	GP	G	A	Pts	PIM
1985–86	Rimouski Mariniers	RHL	36	13	17	30	262	—	—	—	—	—
1986–87	Rimouski Mariniers	RHL	19	9	12	21	164	7	1	2	3	—
1987–88	Baltimore Skipjacks	AHL	15	2	0	2	167	—	—	—	—	—
1987–88	Fredericton Express	AHL	28	2	6	8	137	8	0	0	0	18
1988–89	Quebec Nordiques	NHL	5	0	0	0	33	—	—	—	—	—
1988–89	Halifax Citadels	AHL	35	4	1	5	259	1	0	0	0	5
1989–90	Hampton Roads Admirals	ECHL	5	0	2	2	62	—	—	—	—	—
1989–90	Phoenix Roadrunners	IHL	15	0	0	0	70	—	—	—	—	—
1989–90	Cape Breton Oilers	AHL	6	0	1	1	12	—	—	—	—	—
1989–90	Moncton Hawks	AHL	6	0	0	0	20	—	—	—	—	—
1990–91	Miramichi Gagnon Packers	NBSHL	20	10	6	16	117	—	—	—	—	—
1990–91	San Diego Gulls	IHL	1	0	0	0	2	—	—	—	—	—
1990–91	Johnstown Chiefs	ECHL	2	0	0	0	21	9	1	3	4	46
1990–91	Moncton Hawks	AHL	13	0	0	0	43	—	—	—	—	—
1991–92	Flint Bulldogs	CoHL	29	15	12	27	237	—	—	—	—	—
1991–92	Michigan Falcons	CoHL	5	2	2	4	44	—	—	—	—	—
1992–93	Detroit Falcons	CoHL	48	14	21	35	273	4	2	4	6	12
1993–94	Detroit Falcons	CoHL	21	1	9	10	122	3	0	1	1	49
1994–95	Rochester Americans	AHL	15	0	1	1	52	—	—	—	—	—
1994–95	Utica Blizzard	CoHL	59	11	17	28	302	—	—	—	—	—
1995–96	Utica Blizzard	CoHL	8	1	0	1	71	—	—	—	—	—
1995–96	Quad City Mallards	CoHL	50	14	8	22	253	3	0	0	0	52
1996–97	Utah Grizzlies	IHL	4	0	1	1	32	—	—	—	—	—
1996–97	Central Texas Stampede	WPHL	34	5	8	13	247	8	0	3	3	24
1996–97	Louiseville Jets	QSPHL	2	1	1	2	2	—	—	—	—	—
1997–98	Central Texas Stampede	WPHL	50	14	18	32	277	4	2	1	3	44
1998–99	Fresno Falcons	WCHL	50	7	22	29	289	3	1	0	1	10
1999–00	Central Texas Stampede	WPHL	10	0	1	1	51	—	—	—	—	—
CoHL totals			220	58	69	127	1302	10	2	5	7	113
NHL totals			5	0	0	0	33	—	—	—	—	—
