= Maxime Macenauer =

Canadian ice hockey player (born 1989)

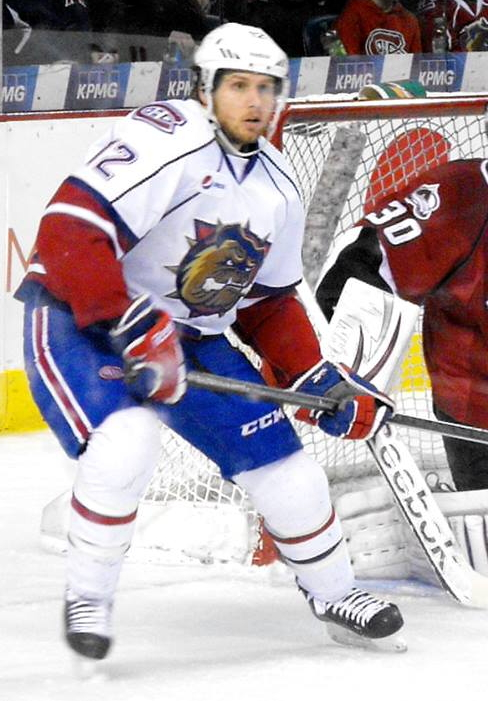
- Macenauer with the Hamilton Bulldogs in 2013
- Born: January 4, 1989 (age 37) Laval, Quebec, Canada
- Height: 5 ft 11 in (180 cm)
- Weight: 176 lb (80 kg; 12 st 8 lb)
- Position: Centre
- Shoots: Left
- team Former teams: Free Agent; Anaheim Ducks; EHC Biel; SC Bern; SCL Tigers
- NHL draft: 63rd overall, 2007; Anaheim Ducks
- Playing career: 2009–present

Maxime Macenauer (born January 4, 1989) is a Canadian professional ice hockey forward who is currently an unrestricted free agent. He most recently played for Les Pétroliers du Nord of the Ligue Nord-Américaine de Hockey (LNAH). He has formerly played in the National Hockey League (NHL) with the Anaheim Ducks.

== Playing career ==
Macenauer was selected by the Anaheim Ducks in the 3rd round (63rd overall) of the 2008 NHL entry draft. He played four seasons major junior hockey in the Quebec Major Junior Hockey League before turning professional with the Bakersfield Condors of the ECHL in the 2009–10 ECHL season.

With the start of the 2010–11 AHL season, Macenauer was promoted to the Syracuse Crunch, and the following year (2011-12), Macenauer made the Anaheim Ducks out of training camp. He scored his first NHL goal on October 14, 2011, in his third NHL game, against Thomas Greiss of the San Jose Sharks. On February 13, 2012, Macenauer was traded by the Ducks to the Winnipeg Jets in exchange for Riley Holzapfel.

After parts of two seasons with the Jets organization, Macenauer was not tendered a new contract and became a free agent. Unable to garner NHL interest, he accepted a try-out to the Hamilton Bulldogs training camp for the 2013–14 season. On December 13, 2013, Macenauer signed an AHL contract to remain with the Bulldogs for the remainder of the campaign.

In 2015, he took his game overseas, signing with EHC Biel of the Swiss National League A (NLA), where he spent the 2015–16 season tallying nine goals and 18 assists in 43 NLA contests. He agreed to terms with fellow NLA outfit SC Bern in September 2016 and transferred within the league to the SCL Tigers in early January 2017.

== Career statistics ==
=== Regular season and playoffs ===
			Regular season					Playoffs
Season	Team	League	GP	G	A	Pts	PIM	GP	G	A	Pts	PIM
2005–06	Rimouski Océanic	QMJHL	41	8	14	22	30	—	—	—	—	—
2006–07	Rouyn-Noranda Huskies	QMJHL	14	1	3	4	10	—	—	—	—	—
2007–08	Rouyn-Noranda Huskies	QMJHL	67	23	37	60	53	17	6	10	16	8
2008–09	Rouyn-Noranda Huskies	QMJHL	35	15	9	24	2	—	—	—	—	—
2008–09	Shawinigan Cataractes	QMJHL	19	7	9	16	18	21	5	9	14	20
2009–10	Bakersfield Condors	ECHL	45	5	16	21	49	6	1	0	1	0
2010–11	Syracuse Crunch	AHL	79	13	19	32	65	—	—	—	—	—
2011–12	Anaheim Ducks	NHL	29	1	3	4	18	—	—	—	—	—
2011–12	Syracuse Crunch	AHL	13	4	2	6	2	—	—	—	—	—
2011–12	St. John's IceCaps	AHL	9	0	1	1	2	10	1	0	1	0
2012–13	St. John's IceCaps	AHL	68	11	11	22	57	—	—	—	—	—
2013–14	Hamilton Bulldogs	AHL	74	9	15	24	56	—	—	—	—	—
2014–15	Hamilton Bulldogs	AHL	47	6	4	10	28	—	—	—	—	—
2015–16	EHC Biel	NLA	36	7	13	20	55	—	—	—	—	—
2016–17	SC Bern	NLA	14	1	2	3	8	—	—	—	—	—
2016–17	SCL Tigers	NLA	14	6	2	8	14	—	—	—	—	—
2017–18	Thetford Assurancia	LNAH	30	12	22	34	30	4	4	6	10	4
2018–19	Thetford Assurancia	LNAH	33	10	26	36	22	7	2	4	6	8
2019–20	Les Pétroliers du Nord	LNAH	32	12	35	47	28	—	—	—	—	—
NHL totals			29	1	3	4	18	—	—	—	—	—

=== International ===
Year	Team	Event	Result	GP	G	A	Pts	PIM
2006	Canada Quebec	U17	1st place, gold medalist(s)	6	1	2	3	4
Junior totals				6	1	2	3	4
