= Éric Lecompte =

Canadian ice hockey player (born 1975)

- Born: April 4, 1975 (age 51) Montreal, Quebec, Canada
- Height: 6 ft 4 in (193 cm)
- Weight: 216 lb (98 kg; 15 st 6 lb)
- Position: Left wing
- Shot: Left
- Played for: Indianapolis Ice; Worcester IceCats; Fort Wayne Komets; Cincinnati Mighty Ducks
- NHL draft: 24th overall, 1993; Chicago Blackhawks
- Playing career: 1995–2010

Éric Lecompte (born April 4, 1975) is a Canadian professional ice hockey left winger. He was drafted in the first round, 24th overall, by the Chicago Blackhawks in the 1993 NHL entry draft. He never played in the National Hockey League.

== Career statistics ==
			Regular season					Playoffs
Season	Team	League	GP	G	A	Pts	PIM	GP	G	A	Pts	PIM
1991–92	Hull Olympiques	QMJHL	60	16	17	33	148	6	1	0	1	4
1992–93	Hull Olympiques	QMJHL	66	33	39	72	149	10	4	4	8	52
1993–94	Hull Olympiques	QMJHL	62	38	49	87	169	20	10	10	20	68
1994–95	Hull Olympiques	QMJHL	11	10	9	19	58	—	—	—	—	—
1994–95	St. Jean Lynx	QMJHL	19	10	10	20	54	—	—	—	—	—
1994–95	Sherbrooke Faucons	QMJHL	34	22	29	51	111	4	2	2	4	4
1994–95	Indianapolis Ice	IHL	3	2	0	2	2	—	—	—	—	—
1995–96	Indianapolis Ice	IHL	79	24	20	44	131	—	—	—	—	—
1996–97	Worcester IceCats	AHL	8	0	1	1	4	—	—	—	—	—
1996–97	Indianapolis Ice	IHL	35	2	3	5	74	—	—	—	—	—
1996–97	Fort Wayne Komets	IHL	14	1	2	3	62	—	—	—	—	—
1997–98	Indianapolis Ice	IHL	46	7	11	18	52	—	—	—	—	—
1997–98	Cincinnati Mighty Ducks	AHL	26	11	8	19	68	—	—	—	—	—
1998–99	Cincinnati Mighty Ducks	AHL	67	11	22	33	183	3	1	2	3	0
1999–2000	Revierlöwen Oberhausen	DEL	45	8	18	26	96	—	—	—	—	—
1999–2000	LaSalle Rapides	QSPHL	5	1	6	7	10	—	—	—	—	—
2000–01	HC Asiago	ITA	32	26	30	56	50	11	7	11	18	51
2001–02	HC Asiago	ITA	37	17	24	41	60	2	0	0	0	27
2002–03	SC Langnau	NLA	5	1	3	4	10	—	—	—	—	—
2002–03	SC Langenthal	CHE.2	34	23	28	51	132	—	—	—	—	—
2002–03	HC Asiago	ITA	2	0	2	2	4	11	9	5	14	16
2003–04	SC Langenthal	CHE.2	41	24	45	69	119	—	—	—	—	—
2003–04	HC Lugano	NLA	—	—	—	—	—	3	2	1	3	4
2004–05	SC Langenthal	CHE.2	44	37	35	72	97	11	3	10	13	24
2005–06	SC Langenthal	CHE.2	41	27	46	73	101	7	2	12	14	0
2006–07	ZSC Lions	NLA	1	0	0	0	0	—	—	—	—	—
2005–06	SC Langenthal	CHE.2	36	14	46	60	61	6	2	6	8	10
2006–07	EV Innsbruck	AUT	9	3	7	10	6	—	—	—	—	—
2007–08	EHC Olten	CHE.2	15	7	16	23	16	—	—	—	—	—
2007–08	St-Jean Chiefs	LNAH	40	28	45	73	73	6	4	7	11	10
2008–09	Saint-Hyacinthe Chiefs	LNAH	26	18	22	40	47	—	—	—	—	—
2008–09	Saguenay 98,3	LNAH	9	1	6	7	6	5	3	3	6	13
2009–10	Saguenay Marquis	LNAH	1	0	0	0	0	—	—	—	—	—
2009–10	Pont-Rouge Lois Jeans	LNAH	2	1	4	5	2	—	—	—	—	—
2011–12	Thetford Mines Isothermic	LNAH	17	10	9	19	9	12	2	3	5	49
2012–13	Thetford Mines Isothermic	LNAH	4	2	3	5	2	—	—	—	—	—
IHL totals			177	36	36	72	321	—	—	—	—	—
QSPHL/LNAH totals			104	61	95	156	149	23	9	13	22	72
CHE.2 totals			211	132	216	348	526	24	7	28	35	34

Preceded by Sergei Krivokrasov	Chicago Blackhawks first-round draft pick 1993	Succeeded by Ethan Moreau
