= Sean McMorrow =

Canadian professional ice hockey winger (born 1982)

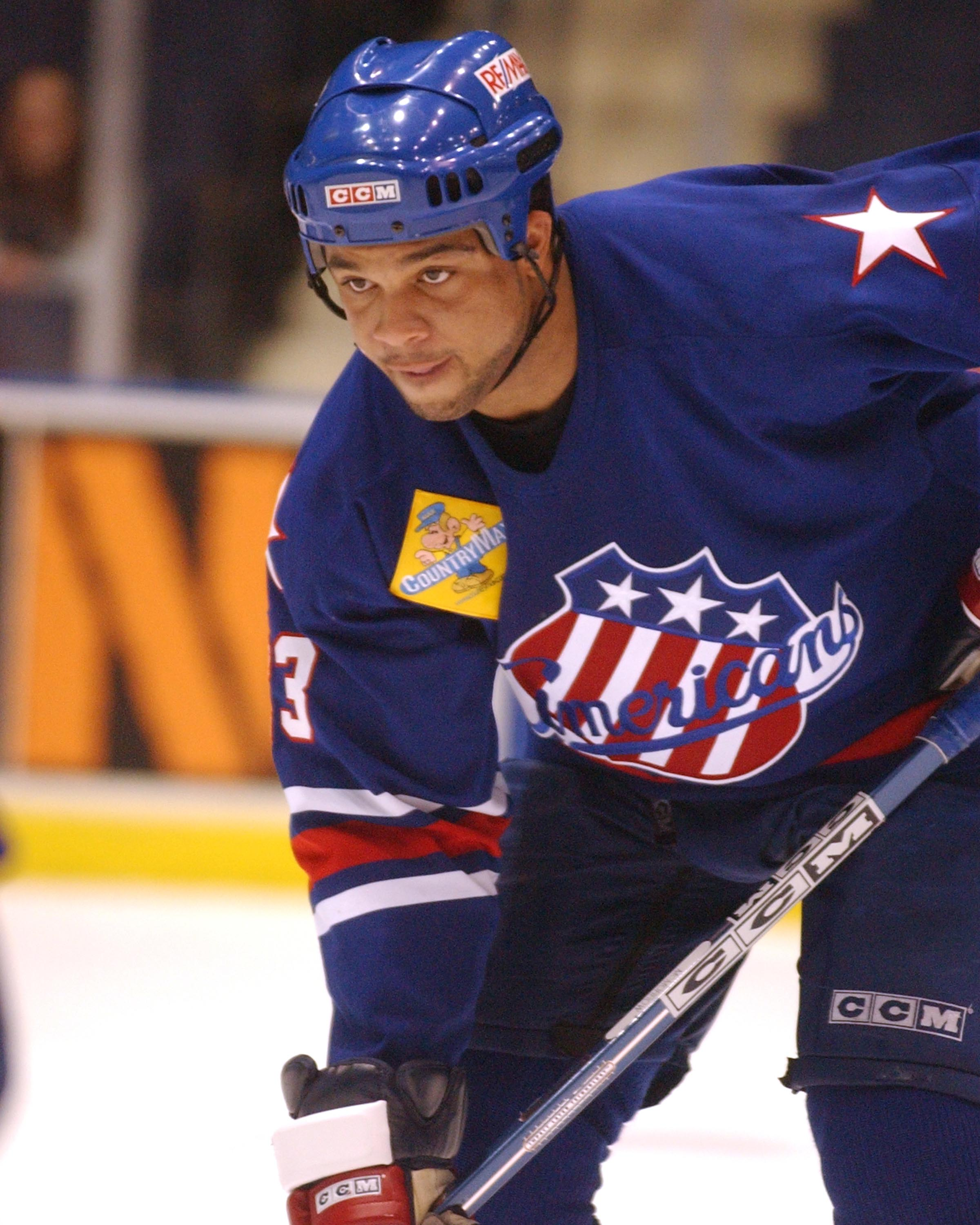
- McMorrow with the Rochester Americans in 2004
- Born: January 19, 1982 (age 44) Vancouver, British Columbia, Canada
- Height: 6 ft 4 in (193 cm)
- Weight: 225 lb (102 kg; 16 st 1 lb)
- Position: Left wing
- Shot: Right
- Played for: Buffalo Sabres; Belfast Giants; Dundee Stars; Jonquière Marquis
- NHL draft: 258th overall, 2000; Buffalo Sabres
- Playing career: 2002–2012

Sean McMorrow (born January 19, 1982) is a Canadian former professional ice hockey winger. He last played semi-professionally for the Jonquière Marquis of the LNAH. Originally selected by the Buffalo Sabres in the 2000 NHL entry draft, McMorrow played in one National Hockey League game with the Sabres during the 2002–03 season. He was born in Vancouver, British Columbia, but grew up in Scarborough, Ontario.

== Playing career ==
As a youth, McMorrow played in the 1996 Quebec International Pee-Wee Hockey Tournament with a minor ice hockey team from Wexford, Toronto.

McMorrow was drafted by the Buffalo Sabres in the 8th round, 258th overall in the 2000 NHL entry draft from the Ontario Hockey League. He made his NHL debut for the Sabres in the 2002–03 NHL season on March 22, 2003 against the Toronto Maple Leafs, McMorrow spent the rest of his time with the Sabres' affiliate, the Rochester Americans. McMorrow was not re-signed by the Buffalo Sabres after the 2005–06 season, and subsequently signed with the Chicago Wolves of the AHL. Due to a lack of playing time, McMorrow left the Wolves in 2006 to play for Saint-Hyacinthe Top Design a semiprofessional hockey team in Quebec's LNAH.

McMorrow signed a professional try-out contract with the Rockford IceHogs of the AHL on October 22, 2008, playing for them in the 2008–09 season.

McMorrow would then go on to sign a contract to play for the Belfast Giants of the Elite Ice Hockey League for the 2009–10 season.

It was announced that McMorrow would return to the EIHL for the 2010–11 season, to play for expansion team, Dundee Stars. On November 5, 2010, it was announced that McMorrow had left the Dundee Stars by mutual consent signing for the LNAH's Saguenay Marquis shortly afterwards.

== Personal ==
During his tenure in the EIHL, McMorrow appeared on season 14 episode 4 of Top Gear as a Belfast ice hockey player supposedly being hit by Jeremy Clarkson in a Renault Twingo as the presenter was driving it around the Belfast Odyssey ice during a scrimmage. His brother is former basketball player Liam McMorrow.

== Career statistics ==
			Regular season					Playoffs
Season	Team	League	GP	G	A	Pts	PIM	GP	G	A	Pts	PIM
1998–99	Pickering Panthers	OPJHL	35	2	10	12	175	—	—	—	—	—
1999–00	Sarnia Sting	OHL	31	0	1	1	75	—	—	—	—	—
1999–00	Kitchener Rangers	OHL	31	0	1	1	67	4	0	0	0	12
2000–01	Mississauga IceDogs	OHL	13	0	0	0	34	—	—	—	—	—
2000–01	Kingston Frontenacs	OHL	7	0	1	1	22	—	—	—	—	—
2000–01	London Knights	OHL	29	0	3	3	75	5	0	0	0	0
2001–02	London Knights	OHL	38	0	1	1	107	—	—	—	—	—
2001–02	Oshawa Generals	OHL	27	6	1	7	63	5	1	0	1	12
2002–03	Rochester Americans	AHL	64	0	1	1	315	3	0	0	0	17
2002–03	Buffalo Sabres	NHL	1	0	0	0	0	—	—	—	—	—
2003–04	Rochester Americans	AHL	57	0	0	0	287	14	1	0	1	15
2004–05	Rochester Americans	AHL	59	3	3	6	288	4	0	0	0	16
2005–06	Rochester Americans	AHL	40	1	1	2	130	—	—	—	—	—
2006–07	Saint–Hyacinthe Top Design	LNAH	20	1	1	2	166	5	0	1	1	23
2007–08	Saint–Hyacinthe Top Design	LNAH	48	1	4	5	527	20	0	0	0	138
2008–09	Rockford IceHogs	AHL	25	0	0	0	141	—	—	—	—	—
2009–10	Belfast Giants	EIHL	48	2	4	6	310	—	—	—	—	—
2010–11	Dundee Stars	EIHL	11	0	1	1	70	—	—	—	—	—
2010–11	Saguenay Marquis	LNAH	20	0	0	0	131	—	—	—	—	—
2011–12	Jonquière Marquis	LNAH	39	6	3	9	325	6	0	0	0	22
2014–15	Jonquière Marquis	LNAH	38	1	1	2	252	9	1	0	1	64
2015–16	Jonquière Marquis	LNAH	39	0	0	0	226	5	0	1	1	30
2019–20	Jonquière Marquis	LNAH	10	0	0	0	48	—	—	—	—	—
AHL totals			245	4	5	9	1161	21	1	0	1	48
NHL totals			1	0	0	0	0	—	—	—	—	—
LNAH totals			214	9	9	18	1675	20	1	1	2	116
