= Brett Gallant (ice hockey) =

Canadian ice hockey player (born 1988)

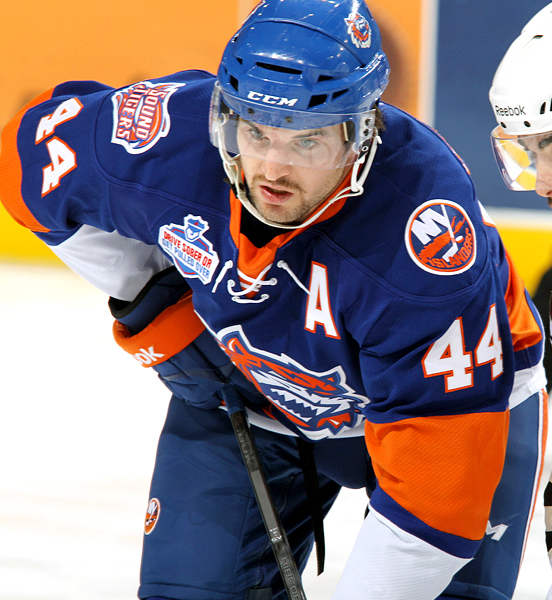
- Gallant with the Bridgeport Sound Tigers in 2013
- Born: December 28, 1988 (age 37) Summerside, Prince Edward Island, Canada
- Height: 6 ft 0 in (183 cm)
- Weight: 185 lb (84 kg; 13 st 3 lb)
- Position: Left wing
- Shoots: Left
- LNAH team Former teams: Pétroliers de Laval; New York Islanders
- NHL draft: Undrafted
- Playing career: 2009–present

Brett Gallant (born December 28, 1988) is a Canadian professional ice hockey player who is currently an unrestricted free agent. He is currently playing for the Pétroliers de Laval of the Ligue Nord-Américaine de Hockey (LNAH). He previously played for the New York Islanders in the National Hockey League (NHL), as well as the Syracuse Crunch, Bridgeport Sound Tigers and Cleveland Monsters in the American Hockey League (AHL).

== Playing career ==
Gallant played junior hockey with the Summerside Western Capitals of the Maritime Junior A Hockey League (MJAHL). He was the team captain during the 2008–09 season when they won the Fred Page Cup, scoring 73 points in 50 games.

On November 20, 2009, the Syracuse Crunch signed Gallant to a professional tryout. After developing in the ECHL with the Elmira Jackals and the Reading Royals, Gallant signed a one-year contract with the Bridgeport Sound Tigers of the American Hockey League.

During his third season with the Bridgeport Sound Tigers in the 2012–13 season, Gallant was rewarded for his play in signing a one-year, entry-level contract with NHL affiliate the New York Islanders on February 5, 2013.

Gallant was recalled by the New York Islanders from the Sound Tigers on April 7, 2014. He played four games in that stretch, recording three fights against noted heavyweights Matt Kassian, George Parros, and Zenon Konopka.

On July 2, 2015, Gallant signed as a free agent to a two-year, two-way contract with the Columbus Blue Jackets.

On April 8, 2016, during the Cleveland Monsters game against the Toronto Marlies, Gallant fainted while sitting on the bench during a TV timeout and was removed from the game. He required operation on his heart before he could continue to play. Despite this setback, Gallant returned to the Monsters lineup for the 2016 Calder Cup Finals over the Hershey Bears, helping his team cinch the Calder Cup in four games.

On July 25, 2019, Gallant continued his tenure with the Monsters, agreeing to a two-year AHL contract extension. On May 14, 2021, Gallant surpassed Daniel Maggio to become the Monsters' career leader in penalty minutes.

== Personal life ==
Gallant is the middle of two brothers who have also played hockey. His eldest brother Bradley played hockey in the QMJHL and the CHL. His youngest brother Alex also played in the American Hockey League and signed with the Vegas Golden Knights in 2018. Alex is currently playing for the Calgary Wranglers.

== Career statistics ==
			Regular season					Playoffs
Season	Team	League	GP	G	A	Pts	PIM	GP	G	A	Pts	PIM
2005–06	Saint John Sea Dogs	QMJHL	26	0	1	1	72	—	—	—	—	—
2005–06	Summerside Western Capitals	MJHL	9	0	2	2	148	—	—	—	—	—
2006–07	Saint John Sea Dogs	QMJHL	48	5	1	6	192	—	—	—	—	—
2007–08	Saint John Sea Dogs	QMJHL	57	3	2	5	175	11	1	0	1	15
2008–09	Summerside Western Capitals	MJHL	50	24	49	73	235	—	—	—	—	—
2009–10	Elmira Jackals	ECHL	38	1	1	2	185	—	—	—	—	—
2009–10	Syracuse Crunch	AHL	1	0	0	0	5	—	—	—	—	—
2010–11	Elmira Jackals	ECHL	13	0	0	0	80	—	—	—	—	—
2010–11	Reading Royals	ECHL	12	1	2	3	52	—	—	—	—	—
2010–11	Bridgeport Sound Tigers	AHL	17	1	0	1	73	—	—	—	—	—
2011–12	Bridgeport Sound Tigers	AHL	25	2	1	3	80	—	—	—	—	—
2012–13	Bridgeport Sound Tigers	AHL	42	0	0	0	202	—	—	—	—	—
2013–14	Bridgeport Sound Tigers	AHL	58	1	1	2	255	—	—	—	—	—
2013–14	New York Islanders	NHL	4	0	0	0	17	—	—	—	—	—
2014–15	Bridgeport Sound Tigers	AHL	45	2	4	6	247	—	—	—	—	—
2015–16	Lake Erie Monsters	AHL	48	0	1	1	151	1	0	1	1	0
2016–17	Cleveland Monsters	AHL	50	3	2	5	128	—	—	—	—	—
2017–18	Cleveland Monsters	AHL	35	1	1	2	66	—	—	—	—	—
2018–19	Cleveland Monsters	AHL	38	2	2	4	65	—	—	—	—	—
2019–20	Cleveland Monsters	AHL	34	2	2	4	80	—	—	—	—	—
2020–21	Cleveland Monsters	AHL	17	2	0	2	41	—	—	—	—	—
2021–22	Cleveland Monsters	AHL	53	4	0	4	98	—	—	—	—	—
2022–23	Cleveland Monsters	AHL	32	4	0	4	34	—	—	—	—	—
AHL totals			494	24	14	38	1525	1	0	1	1	0
NHL totals			4	0	0	0	17	—	—	—	—	—

== Awards and honours ==
Awards	Year
AHL
Calder Cup (Lake Erie Monsters)	2016
