= Patrick Côté (ice hockey) =

Canadian ice hockey player (born 1975)

- Born: January 24, 1975 (age 51) LaSalle, Quebec, Canada
- Height: 6 ft 3 in (191 cm)
- Weight: 199 lb (90 kg; 14 st 3 lb)
- Position: Left wing
- Shot: Left
- Played for: Dallas Stars; Nashville Predators; Edmonton Oilers
- NHL draft: 37th overall, 1995; Dallas Stars
- Playing career: 1995–2008

Patrick Côté (born January 24, 1975) is a Canadian former professional ice hockey player. He spent parts of six seasons in the National Hockey League (NHL) before continuing his career in Quebec's Ligue Nord-Américaine de Hockey.

== Biography ==
Côté was born in LaSalle, Quebec, a suburb of Montreal known for its strong hockey culture and deep ties to the sport. During his youth, he showcased his skills on a larger stage by competing in the prestigious 1989 Quebec International Pee-Wee Hockey Tournament where he represented a minor ice hockey team from Saint-Laurent, Quebec.

Chosen 37th overall by the Dallas Stars in the 1995 NHL entry draft, Côté appeared in only eight NHL games across three seasons with the team. He later joined the Nashville Predators, recording three points (one goal and two assists) in 91 games over two seasons while amassing 313 penalty minutes. Côté still holds the Predators’ single‑season record for penalty minutes, racking up 242 during the 1998-99 campaign, the franchise's inaugural NHL season. He also suited up for six games with the Edmonton Oilers and went on to spend several seasons in the Ligue Nord-Américaine de Hockey from 2001 to 2008.

In 2002, Côté's life took a troubling turn when he was taken into custody in Malone, New York, after border authorities discovered 30 pounds of marijuana hidden in his vehicle during a routine stop. He ultimately avoided the most serious penalties by pleading guilty to a lesser charge. On July 22, 2014, Côté was sentenced to 30 months in prison after pleading guilty to robbing two banks in the suburbs of Montreal.

== Career statistics ==
			Regular season					Playoffs
Season	Team	League	GP	G	A	Pts	PIM	GP	G	A	Pts	PIM
1993–94	Beauport Harfangs	QMJHL	48	2	4	6	230	12	1	0	1	61
1994–95	Beauport Harfangs	QMJHL	56	20	20	40	314	17	8	8	16	115
1995–96	Michigan K-Wings	IHL	57	4	6	10	239	3	0	0	0	2
1995–96	Dallas Stars	NHL	2	0	0	0	5	—	—	—	—	—
1996–97	Michigan K-Wings	IHL	58	14	10	24	237	4	2	0	2	6
1996–97	Dallas Stars	NHL	3	0	0	0	27	—	—	—	—	—
1997–98	Michigan K-Wings	IHL	4	2	0	2	4	—	—	—	—	—
1997–98	Dallas Stars	NHL	3	0	0	0	15	—	—	—	—	—
1998–99	Nashville Predators	NHL	70	1	2	3	242	—	—	—	—	—
1999–00	Nashville Predators	NHL	21	0	0	0	70	—	—	—	—	—
2000–01	Hamilton Bulldogs	AHL	16	0	1	1	61	—	—	—	—	—
2000–01	Edmonton Oilers	NHL	6	0	0	0	18	—	—	—	—	—
2001–02	Laval Chiefs	LHSPQ	6	0	0	0	53	—	—	—	—	—
2002–03	Laval Chiefs	LHSPQ	19	4	3	7	134	10	0	2	2	62
2003–04	Laval Chiefs	LHSMQ	28	0	6	6	320	6	1	0	1	23
2004–05	Laval Chiefs	LNAH	4	0	0	0	23	—	—	—	—	—
2005–06	Laval Chiefs	LNAH	14	2	1	3	81	3	0	0	0	68
2006–07	St-Jean Chiefs	LNAH	28	3	9	12	184	9	0	2	2	42
2007–08	Sorel-Tracy Mission	LNAH	8	1	1	2	34	—	—	—	—	—
NHL totals			105	1	2	3	377	—	—	—	—	—
