= 1996–97 QSPHL season =

Semi-pro hockey league

The 1996–97 QSPHL season was the first season of the Quebec Semi-Pro Hockey League, a minor professional league in the Canadian province of Quebec. 13 teams participated in the regular season, and the Blizzard de Saint-Gabriel won the league title.

== Regular season ==
Division Est	GP	W	L	OTL	GF	GA	Pts
Grand Portneuf de Pont-Rouge	36	26	7	3	208	119	55
Coyotes de Thetford Mines	36	20	14	2	162	153	42
Chacals de la Rive-Sud	36	15	17	4	153	171	34
Voyageurs de Vanier	36	11	23	2	130	217	24

Division Centrale	GP	W	L	OTL	GF	GA	Pts
Nova d'Acton Vale	36	27	7	2	185	137	56
94 de Waterloo	36	16	18	2	185	192	34
Gladiateurs de ville des Laurentides	35	11	20	4	144	179	26
Papetiers de Windsor	36	8	24	4	150	227	20

Division Ouest	GP	W	L	OTL	GF	GA	Pts
Blizzard de Saint-Gabriel	36	26	7	3	192	131	55
Dragons du Haut-Richelieu	35	22	9	4	179	154	48
Dinosaures de Sorel	36	20	12	4	168	168	44
Rapides de Lachute	36	20	13	3	189	159	43
Jets de Louiseville	36	11	22	3	142	180	25

== Coupe Futura-Playoffs ==
Coupe Futura-1/8 Finals
O1	Blizzard de Saint-Gabriel	3
O4	Rapides de Lachute	2
O2	Dragons du Haut-Richelieu	3
O3	Dinosaures de Sorel	2
E1	Grand Portneuf de Pont-Rouge	3
E4	Voyageurs de Vanier	1
E2	Coyotes de Thetford Mines	3
E3	Chacals de la Rive-Sud	0
C1	Nova d'Acton Vale	3
C4	Papetiers de Windsor	0
C2	94 de Waterloo	3
C3	Gladiateurs de ville des Laurentides	1

Coupe Futura-Quarterfinals
O1	Blizzard de Saint-Gabriel	3
O2	Dragons du Haut-Richelieu	1
E1	Grand Portneuf de Pont-Rouge	2
E2	Coyotes de Thetford Mines	3
C1	Nova d'Acton Vale	3
C3	Gladiateurs de ville des Laurentides	2

Coupe Futura-Semifinals
O1	Blizzard de Saint-Gabriel	3
E2	Coyotes de Thetford Mines	0
C1	Nova d'Acton Vale
Bye

Coupe Futura-Final
O1	Blizzard de Saint-Gabriel	4
C1	Nova d'Acton Vale	2
