= Colisée de Laval =

Arena in Laval, Quebec, Canada

Colisee de Laval
- Le Colisee, the "House Of Pain"
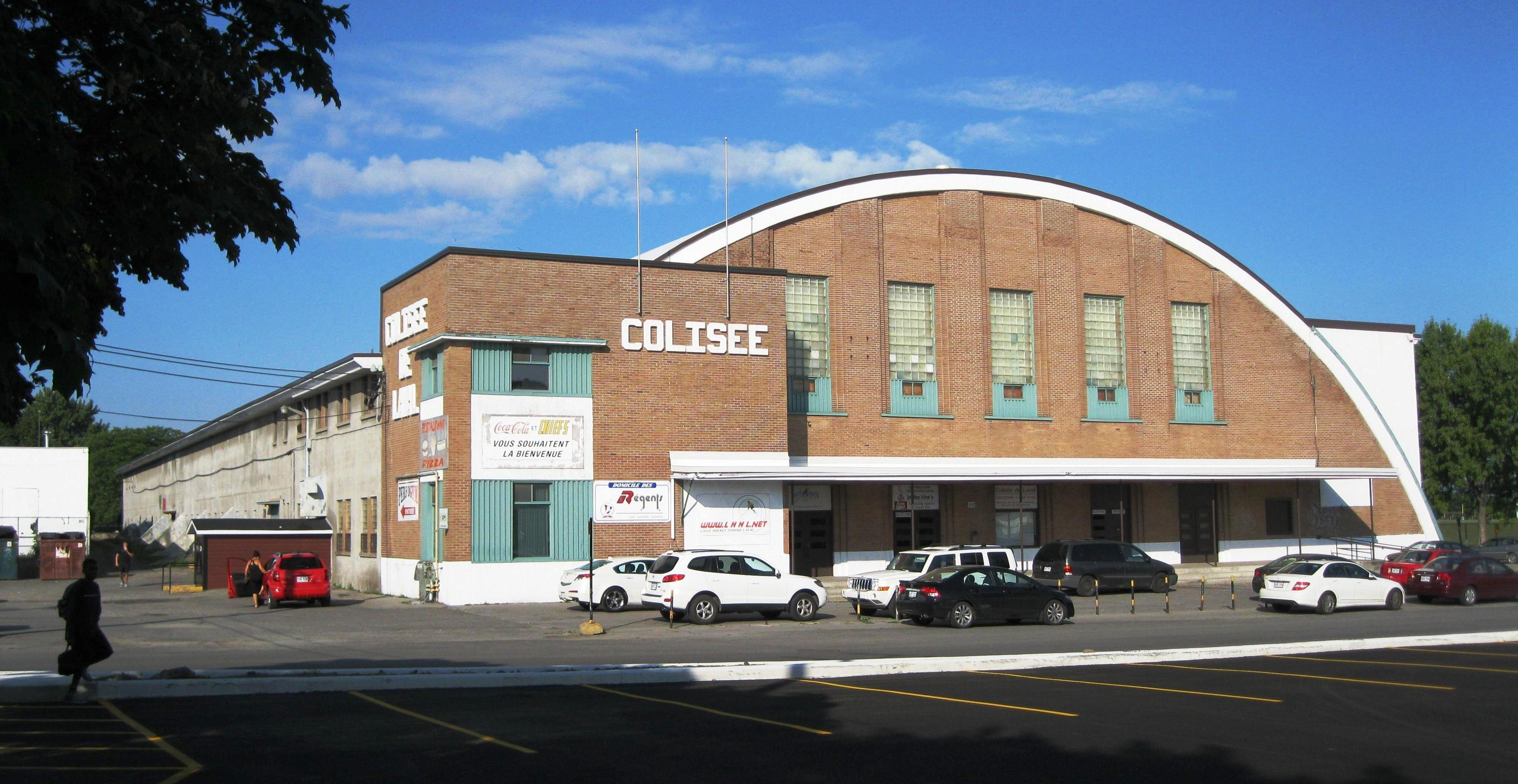

- Location within Quebec Location within Canada
- Full name: Colisee de Laval
- Location: 1110 Av Desnoyers, Laval, QC H7C 1Y5
- Coordinates: 45°36′48″N 73°39′2″W
- Owner: Marist Brothers
- Capacity: Ice hockey: 3,500
- Surface: Ice
- Field size: 200' x 85' (ice)

Construction
- Groundbreaking: 1953; 73 years ago
- Opened: 1954; 72 years ago

Tenants
- Laval National (QMJHL) (1971–1979); Laval Voisins (QMJHL) (1979–1985); Laval Titan (QMJHL) (1985–1994); Laval Titan Collège Français (QMJHL) (1994–1998); Laval Chiefs (LNAH) (1998–2006); Montreal Rocket (QMJHL) (2003); Laval-Bourassa Régents (QAAA) (2006–2009); Laval Predators (LNAH) (2013–2017); Les Pétroliers du Nord (LNAH) (2019-2026)

The Colisée de Laval is a 3,500-seat multi-purpose arena in Laval, Quebec, Canada. Built in 1954, it has been the home of many minor league and junior ice hockey teams. In 2019, the Les Pétroliers du Nord of the Ligue Nord-Américaine de Hockey moved into Colisée de Laval after signing a five-year lease.

== Function ==
Colisée de Laval has primarily been used as the home arena for several hockey teams in the Laval Area.

- The Laval National, a Quebec Major Junior Hockey League team in the who had played the prior two seasons as the Rosemont National and relocated to Laval, played their first season at Colisée de Laval in 1971. The team would go through several name changes. In 1979, the team name was changed to Laval Voisins (French for "neighbors"), a name that the franchise would use until 1985. That year, the franchise would change the name from Voisin to Laval Titan. In 1994, after the team chose to bring on sponsor Collège Français (from nearby Verdun), the team name was changed to Laval Titan Collège Français. After slumping attendance, the franchise relocated to Bathurst as the Acadie-Bathurst Titan.
- The Colisée hosted the Memorial Cup in 1994.
- The Laval Chiefs, who played in the Quebec Semi-Pro Hockey League, Quebec Senior Major Hockey League, and the Ligue Nord-Américaine de Hockey (LNAH), called the Colisée home from 1998 until 2006, when the team moved from Laval to nearby Saint-Jean-sur-Richelieu. The team was sold to Genex Communications in 2005-2006 and were rechristened the Laval-Summum Chiefs, after one of Genex's magazines. A season later, the team was moved from Laval and became the Saint-Jean-sur-Richelieu Summum Chiefs at the start of the 2006–07 season. Parts of the 2004 movie Les Chiefs, a documentary about the LHSPQ team Laval Chiefs, were shot inside Colisée de Laval during the 2001–02 season.
- The Montreal Rocket played several games at the Colisee during the 2003 QMJHL season.
- The Laval-Bourassa Régents, a AAA Quebec midget team, called Colisée home at the start of the 2006 season and won the Jimmy Ferrari Trophy as playoff champion in 2009. The Laval-Bourassa team disbanded after that season. The team continues to play as the Laval-Montreal Rousseau-Royal, but plays their home games in Northern Montreal at Garon Arena.
- Beginning in fall 2012, the Colisée was to have its first major non-hockey tenant in its 58-year history as the Laval Kebs (previously based in Québec City) were slated to begin play there as a member of the National Basketball League of Canada. However, the team was relocated to become the Montreal Jazz before the season started.
- Eleven games into the 2013–14 LNAH hockey season, the Valleyfield Braves relocated to the Colisée de Laval and became the Laval Braves, returning the LNAH to Laval after a seven-year absence. After one season, the Braves rebranded as the Laval Predators.

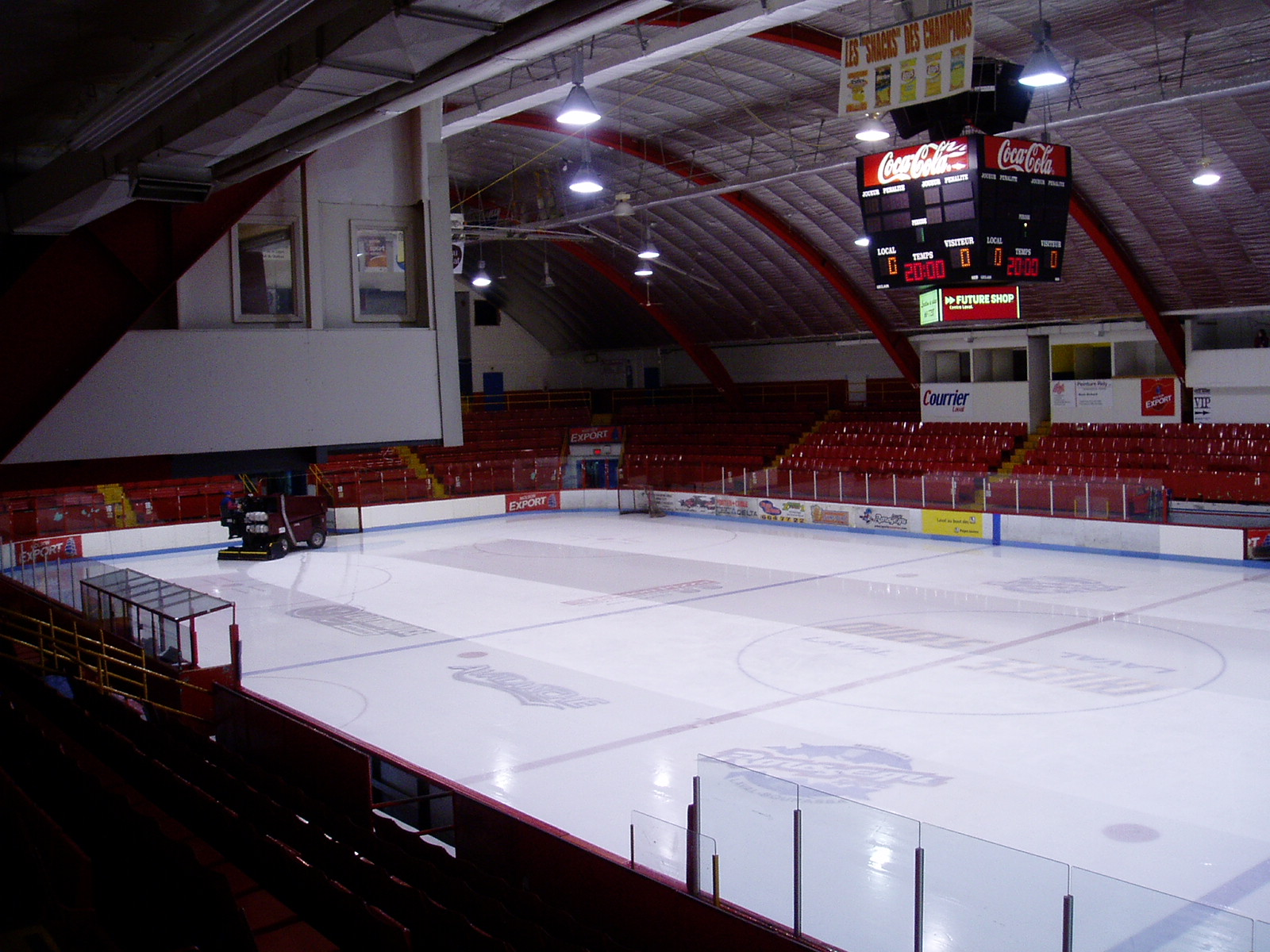
Interior of the Colisée
