= Les Chiefs =

2001 film by Jason Gileno

- Directed by: Jason Gileno
- Produced by: David Bajurny
- Starring: Laval Chiefs
- Edited by: Jason Gileno
- Distributed by: East Hill Productions
- Release dates: January 20, 2004 (USA); September 1, 2004 (CAN)
- Running time: 90 min.
- Country: Canada
- Languages: English; French
- Budget: $20,000

Les Chiefs is a 2004 Canadian documentary film directed by Jason Gileno. Les Chiefs follows the Laval Chiefs, a semi-pro team that plays in the LHSPQ, from the beginning of the 2001-2002 season until the start of the 2002-2003 season.

== Plot ==
The film opens with "The Super Fan", an avid Chiefs fan, making his 3rd belt. The film depicts the lives of 5 Chiefs players: Mike Bajurny (brother of producer David Bajurny), Brady Austin, Mike Henderson and Cory Holland.

With the exception of Henderson, all of these players live in an abandoned storage area on the second story of Colisée de Laval, affectionately known as "The Rat's Nest". Several players discuss the living conditions. Some don't mind it, while other say that since the room is near an exit, the apartments will not be used for a fire exit. Henderson mentions that the living situation isn't bad for a young single guy.

Henderson discusses his role with the team. He doesn't think he is limited to being a fighter, but considers himself to have an Owen Nolan-type of role with the team, where he could be tough as needed.

The Super Fan shows how he prepares for a big game, which involves the shining of one of his championship belts. A shot of the arena is shown with fans mock-fighting each other with security surrounding the ice. Craig Martin discusses a line brawl and how it originated. At the end of the second, the team was trailing 3-0, but the Chiefs would score 7 goals to come back and win.

Families of the players discuss their son's and boyfriend's role with the team. Bajurny's mother does not approve of her son's role as a fighter. Henderson's fiancé discusses how they met and how she feels about him playing professional hockey.

A 6'5", 265 lbs ex-military strong man by the name of Tim Leveque comes to play for the Chiefs. The players discuss Tim coming to the team, and some players are concerned about not knowing his background. He immediately establishes himself as an enforcer. He is shown fighting 6'7", 320 lb Dominic "The Giant" Forcier and beats him.

Near the end of the film a boxing promoter comes to town and tries to get Bajurny and Holland to fight. Bajurny and Holland at first accept it. But after an inspiring talk from his grandfather, Bajurny says no, but Holland still goes through with it. Holland loses his fight.

In the playoffs, Bajurny is benched for fighting, while Austin and Holland are removed from the lineup. The Chiefs win the championship, and the earlier conflicts are set aside.

== Conclusion ==
The closing credits shows what has become of several Chiefs players the following season.

- Austin was not invited back to the Laval Chiefs.
- Bajurny returned to Laval the following year
- Holland returned, but was traded to last place Granby Prédateurs.
- Henderson returned, but was suspended for the entire season for fighting in the stands.
- Leveque is shown moving into a rented basement and talks about his past while a video of a kid learning how to skate is shown.

Since the film was released, the Laval Chiefs would relocate to Saint-Jean-sur-Richelieu in 2006; they have since moved to Saguenay, playing today as the Jonquière Marquis.

== Awards ==
- Atlantic Film Festival - Special Jury Prize for Outstanding Documentary (2004)
- Voted #2 on ESPN's list of best hockey movies of all time.

Les Chiefs was the inspiration for Jay Bachurel's film Goon, starring Seann William Scott, Liev Schreiber, and Alison Pil.

== See also ==
- List of films about ice hockey
