= Garrett Burnett =

Canadian ice hockey player (1975–2022)

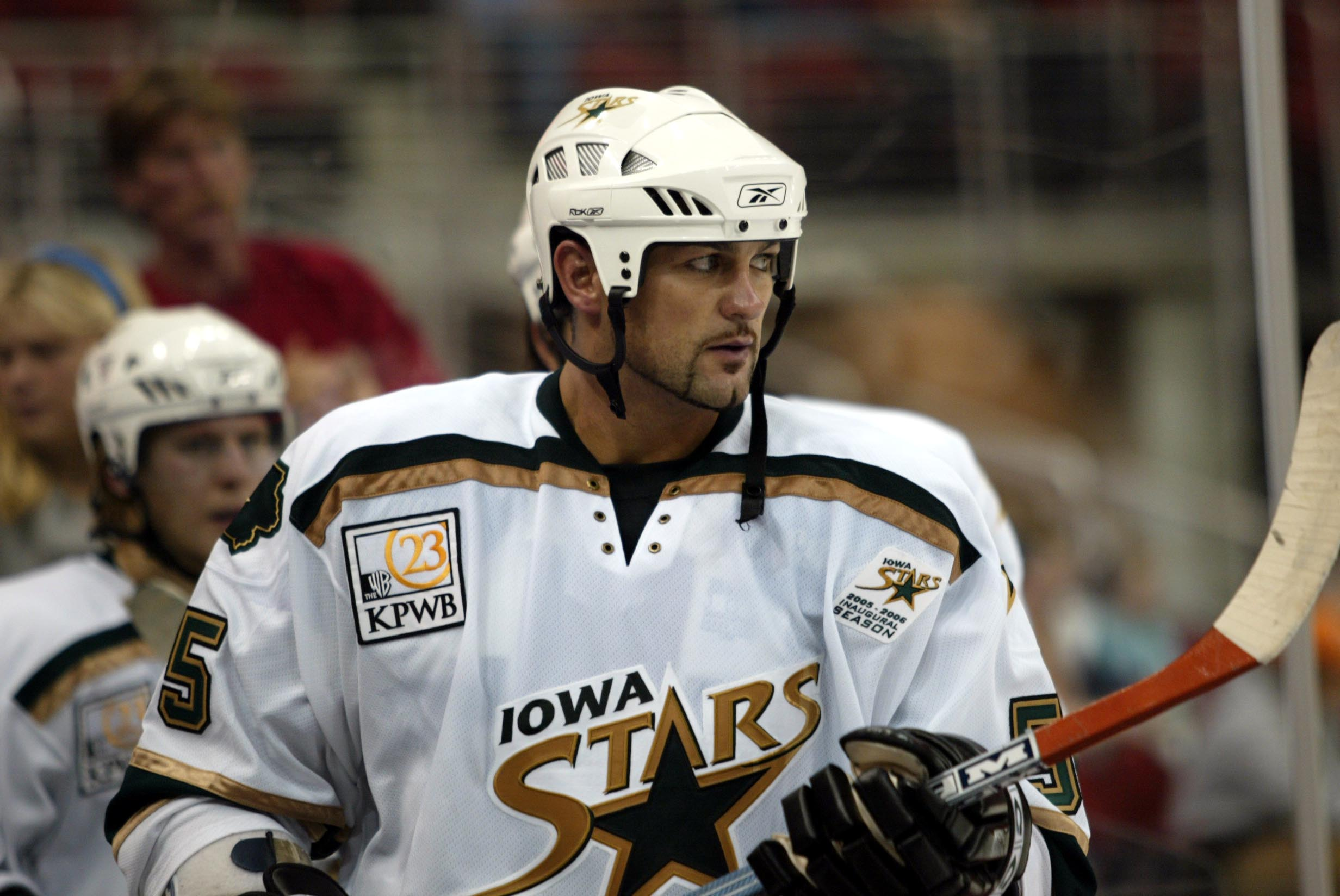
- Burnett with the Iowa Stars in 2005
- Born: September 23, 1975 Coquitlam, British Columbia, Canada
- Died: April 11, 2022 (aged 46) Toronto, Ontario, Canada
- Height: 6 ft 3 in (191 cm)
- Weight: 235 lb (107 kg; 16 st 11 lb)
- Position: Left wing
- Shot: Left
- Played for: Mighty Ducks of Anaheim
- NHL draft: Undrafted
- Playing career: 1995–2006

Garrett "Rocky" Burnett (September 23, 1975 – April 11, 2022) was a Canadian professional ice hockey player who played with the Mighty Ducks of Anaheim of the National Hockey League in the 2003–04 season.

== Playing career ==
Undrafted, Burnett played primarily in the then-named East Coast Hockey League (ECHL) before signing as a free agent with the San Jose Sharks of the National Hockey League (NHL) on June 2, 1998. Used solely as an enforcer, Burnett was largely a journeyman. In Burnett's minor league career, he amassed 2,562 penalty minutes for 13 different teams. In the 1999–2000 season, in only 58 games with the Kentucky Thoroughblades of the American Hockey League (AHL), he had 506 penalty minutes.

After signing with the Mighty Ducks of Anaheim on July 25, 2003, Burnett made his NHL debut in the 2003–04 season. Burnett's first career NHL goal came against Brent Johnson of the Phoenix Coyotes on March 17, 2004. The enforcer played 39 games and registered 184 penalty minutes while scoring one goal and adding two assists. Burnett participated in 22 fights in his sole NHL season with the Mighty Ducks of Anaheim. His reputation for having a "face of stone" was solidified in his March 19, 2004, fight against San Jose's Scott Parker, who sustained a broken hand from fighting Burnett.

Burnett signed an NHL one-way contract for the 2004–05 season plus a one-year option, but due to the 2004–05 NHL lockout only played briefly as the player-assistant coach for the Danbury Trashers of the United Hockey League (UHL) in 2004. Burnett became a free agent and was signed by the Dallas Stars for the 2005–06 season, in which he played for Dallas' minor league affiliates the Iowa Stars and Phoenix RoadRunners.

His last game played was in the Quebec-based Ligue Nord-Américaine de Hockey (LNAH) on December 17, 2006, playing for the Summum Chiefs. The league suspended him for throwing a net at an opposing player. Although the suspension was originally three games, it was later adjusted to thirty-six games. The team did not contest the suspension due to the severity of Burnett's injury, which would have made the appeal moot.

== Two-sport athlete ==
Burnett also tried his hand at lacrosse, signing with the Arizona Sting of the National Lacrosse League (NLL) in 2006, landing on their practice roster. He had not played an NLL game as of the 2006 season. During the 2006 season he played lacrosse for the New Westminster Salmonbellies of the Western Lacrosse Association Vancouver.

== Victim of assault ==
Burnett was assaulted in the early hours of December 26, 2006, inside and outside of a nightclub in North Delta, British Columbia. He was in a coma in a Vancouver hospital. According to family, he was on life support and in a coma for three weeks and doing much better, yet he was also recovering/rehabilitating and being treated regularly as an outpatient four years later. As of 2010, no charges had been laid in the incident.

In December 2008, Burnett sued the Delta Police Department and Corporation of Delta among others as well as the owners of the nightclub Cheers, and bouncers in relation to the 2006 incident. In November 2011 Burnett lost his negligence lawsuit.

== Death ==
Burnett died on April 11, 2022, at the age of 46. He was diagnosed with chronic traumatic encephalopathy (CTE) following his death.

== Career statistics ==
			Regular season					Playoffs
Season	Team	League	GP	G	A	Pts	PIM	GP	G	A	Pts	PIM
1994–95	Sault Ste. Marie Greyhounds	OHL	14	0	1	1	78	—	—	—	—	—
1994–95	Kitchener Rangers	OHL	22	0	1	1	74	3	0	1	1	23
1995–96	Utica Blizzard	CoHL	15	0	1	1	78	—	—	—	—	—
1995–96	Oklahoma City Blazers	CHL	3	0	0	0	20	—	—	—	—	—
1995–96	Tulsa Oilers	CHL	6	1	0	1	94	—	—	—	—	—
1995–96	Nashville Knights	ECHL	3	0	0	0	22	—	—	—	—	—
1995–96	Jacksonville Lizard Kings	ECHL	8	0	1	1	38	1	0	0	0	0
1996–97	Knoxville Cherokees	ECHL	50	5	11	16	321	—	—	—	—	—
1997–98	Johnstown Chiefs	ECHL	34	1	1	2	331	—	—	—	—	—
1997–98	Philadelphia Phantoms	AHL	14	1	2	3	129	—	—	—	—	—
1998–99	Kentucky Thoroughblades	AHL	31	1	0	1	186	—	—	—	—	—
1999–2000	Kentucky Thoroughblades	AHL	58	3	3	6	506	4	0	0	0	31
2000–01	Cleveland Lumberjacks	IHL	54	2	4	6	250	—	—	—	—	—
2001–02	New Haven Knights	UHL	4	1	0	1	40	—	—	—	—	—
2001–02	Cincinnati Mighty Ducks	AHL	32	1	0	1	175	—	—	—	—	—
2002–03	Hartford Wolf Pack	AHL	62	6	1	7	346	1	0	0	0	2
2003–04	Mighty Ducks of Anaheim	NHL	39	1	2	3	184	—	—	—	—	—
2004–05	Danbury Trashers	UHL	7	0	1	1	48	—	—	—	—	—
2005–06	Iowa Stars	AHL	10	0	1	1	104	—	—	—	—	—
2005–06	Phoenix RoadRunners	ECHL	29	1	2	3	74	—	—	—	—	—
2006–07	Saint-Jean Chiefs	LNAH	4	0	0	0	70	—	—	—	—	—
AHL totals			261	14	11	25	1696	5	0	0	0	33
NHL totals			39	1	2	3	184	—	—	—	—	—
