= 2017–18 LNAH season =

Canadian ice hockey league season

The 2017–18 LNAH season was the 22nd season of the Ligue Nord-Américaine de Hockey (before 2004 the Quebec Semi-Pro Hockey League), a minor professional league in the Canadian province of Quebec. Six teams participated in the regular season, which was won by the Sorel-Tracy Eperviers. Sorel-Tracy Eperviers also won the playoff championship.

== Regular season ==
	GP	W	L	OTL	GF	GA	Pts
Sorel-Tracy Eperviers	36	23	7	6	160	126	52
Jonquière Marquis	36	20	11	5	142	122	45
Riviere-du-Loup 3L	36	19	14	3	152	155	41
Thetford Mines Assurancia	36	19	16	1	136	135	39
Saint-Georges Cool FM 103.5	36	16	17	3	126	136	35
Trois-Rivieres Draveurs	36	11	22	3	123	165	25

== Coupe Canam-Playoffs ==
All six teams qualify for the playoffs. The two highest seeded quarterfinal losers advances to a repechage (2nd chance round) which is best-of-three. The winner of that series advances to the semifinals. All other rounds are best-of-seven.

=== Quarterfinals ===
- Sorel-Tracy Éperviers defeated Trois-Rivières Draveurs 4 games to 2
- Jonquière Marquis defeated Saint Georges Cool FM 103.5 4 games to 2
- Rivière-du-Loup 3L defeated Thetford Mines Assurancia 4 games to 3

=== Repechage ===
- Thetford Mines Assurancia defeated Saint Georges Cool FM 103.5 2 games to 1

=== Semifinals ===
- Sorel-Tracy Éperviers defeated Thetford Mines Assurancia 4 games to 3
- Rivière-du-Loup 3L defeated Jonquière Marquis 4 games to 2

=== Final ===
- Sorel-Tracy Éperviers defeated Rivière-du-Loup 3L 4 games to 2
