= Asbestos Aztèques =

- City: Asbestos, Quebec
- League: Quebec Semi-Pro Hockey League
- Founded: 1997
- Folded: 2003

Franchise history
- 1997–2000: Asbestos Aztèques
- 2000–2002: Asbestos Dubé
- 2002–2003: Asbestos Aztèques

The Asbestos Aztèques were a Canadian minor pro ice hockey team in Asbestos, Quebec. They played in the Quebec Semi-Pro Hockey League from 1997 to 2003.

They were named the Aztèques from 1997 to 2000, and from 2002 to 2003, and the Dubé from 2000 to 2002.
