= Granby Prédateurs (LNAH) =

- City: Granby, Quebec
- League: Quebec Semi-Pro Hockey League
- Founded: 1996
- Folded: 2004

Franchise history
- 1996–1997: Waterloo 94
- 1997–2002: Granby Blitz
- 2002–2004: Granby Prédateurs

The Granby Prédateurs were a semi-professional ice hockey team in Granby, Quebec. Founded in 1996, they played in the Quebec Semi-Pro Hockey League under three different names by the time they folded in 2004.

The club was founded in 1996 as Waterloo 94, in nearby Waterloo, before moving 20 kilometres (12 mi) west to Granby after its first season. They changed their name to the Granby Blitz (French: Blitz de Granby, lit. 'Blitz of Granby') in 1997 and to the Prédateurs in 2002.

As of April 1997, the Granby Predateurs were owned by six members of the Morrissette family, including governor Georges Morrissette and general manager Jean-Claude Morrissette.

== Notable players ==
- James Desmarais
