= Centre Mario Gosselin =

Multi-purpose arena in Thetford Mines, Quebec

Coordinates: 46°05′54″N 71°18′23″W

The Centre Mario Gosselin is a multi-purpose arena in Thetford Mines, Quebec. It was built in 1964 and has a capacity of 2,500. It was first called the Centre des Loisirs but, in the middle of the 80's, it was renamed for NHL and Team Canada goalie Mario Gosselin, who was born in Thetford Mines and helped Canada finish fourth at the 1984 Winter Olympics. It is home to the Thetford Assurancia of the Ligue Nord-Américaine de Hockey.

In 2024, it was announced the centre would undergo an extensive period of renovation.
