= Colisée Cardin =

Arena in Sorel-Tracy, Quebec, Canada

Coordinates: 46.0396525°N 73.103832°W

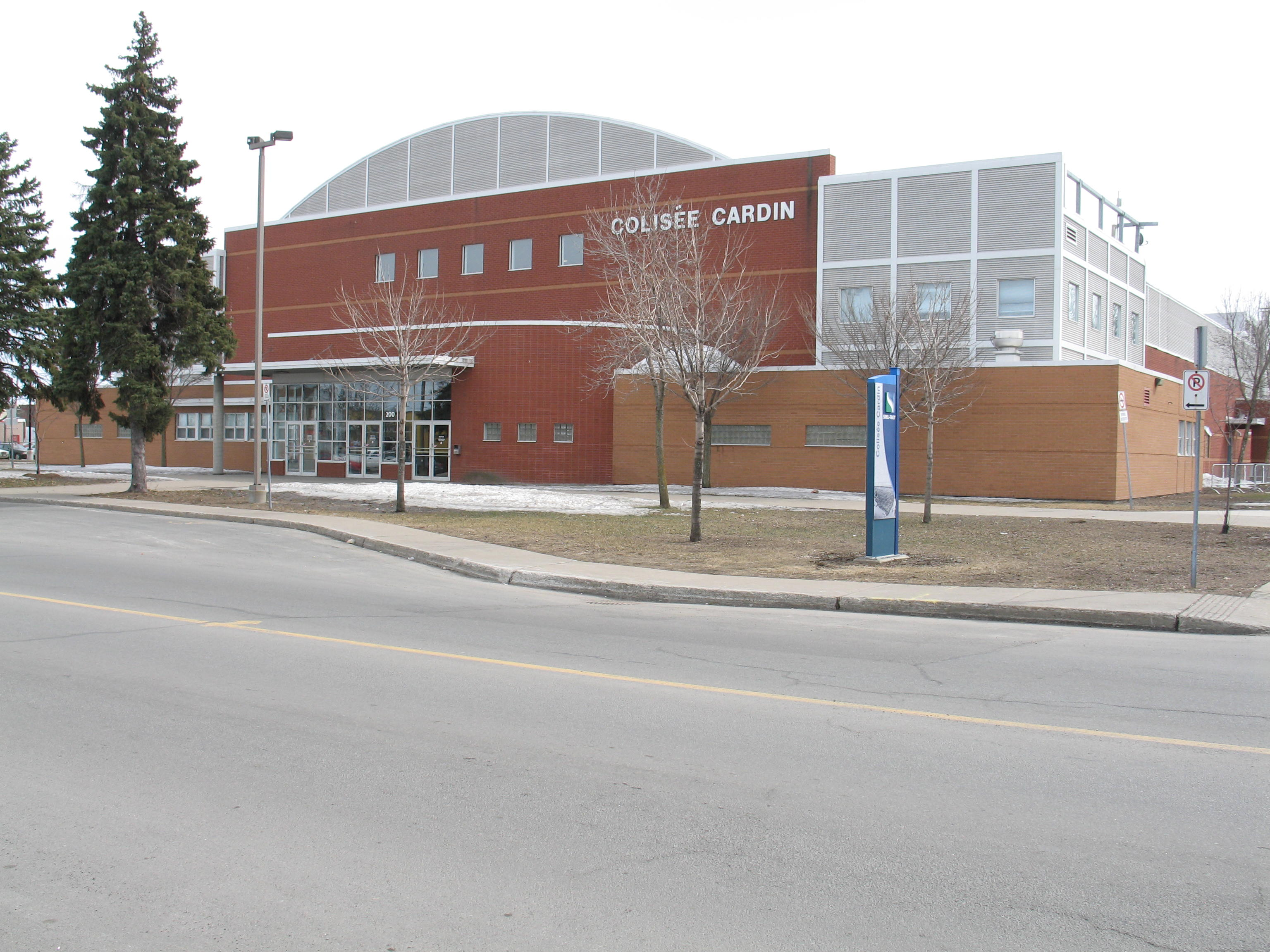
The Colisée Cardin.

The Colisée Cardin (Cardin Coliseum) is an indoor arena located in Sorel-Tracy, Quebec. It was built in 1954 and has a capacity of 3,037 people. It once hosted the Sorel Éperviers of the QMJHL. The arena's primary tenant today are the Sorel-Tracy Éperviers of the LNAH.
