= Louiseville Jets =

- City: Louiseville, Quebec
- League: Quebec Semi-Pro Hockey League
- Founded: 1996

Franchise history
- 1996-1997: Louiseville Jets

The Louiseville Jets were a Canadian semi-professional ice hockey team in Louiseville, Quebec. They played in the Quebec Semi-Pro Hockey League for the 1996–97 season, before folding.

For the October 25, 1996 game against the Windsor Papetiers, the Jets boycotted the game along with the rest of the league to protest the inclusion of Hells Angels member Sylvain Vachon playing for the Papetiers.
