= Rivière-du-Loup 3L =

- City: Rivière-du-Loup, Quebec
- League: Ligue Nord-Américaine de Hockey
- Founded: 2004
- Home arena: Centre Premier Tech
- Head coach: Éric Dandenault
- Website: https://rdl.lnah.com/

Franchise history
- 2004–2010: Rivière-du-Loup CIMT
- 2010–present: Rivière-du-Loup 3L

3L de Rivière-du-Loup or the Rivière-du-Loup 3L is a professional ice hockey team in the Ligue Nord-Américaine de Hockey (LNAH) based in Rivière-du-Loup, Quebec. The team was founded in 2004 and first played in the LNAH in the 2008–09 season.

== History ==
From 2004 to 2010, the team was known as the Rivière-du-Loup CIMT, named after the CIMT-DT, the local TVA affiliate that sponsored the team. The city of Rivière-du-Loup earlier in the decade had teams in the Quebec Semi-Pro Hockey League, Quebec Senior Major Hockey League and Quebec Senior Central Hockey League.
