= Saint-Hyacinthe Chiefs =

Ice hockey team

'Saint-Hyacinthe Top Design"
Founded	1996; 29 years ago
Folded	2009; 16 years ago
Home ice	Stade L.P. Gaucher
Based in	Saint-Hyacinthe, Quebec
Colours	Grey, Gold and White
League	Ligue Nord-Américaine de Hockey

The Saint-Hyacinthe Chiefs was a semi-pro ice hockey team based in Saint-Hyacinthe, Quebec, which is now defunct. The team was part of the Ligue Nord-Américaine de Hockey (LNAH). The Chiefs played at the Stade L.P. Gaucher.

The team started in Acton Vale, Quebec as the Acton Vale Nova in 1996 and later became the Acton Vale Beaulieu. They moved to Saint-Hyacinthe in 2001–2002 and were named the Saint-Hyacinthe Cousin. The team was renamed the Saint-Hyacinthe Cristal in 2005–2006, before becoming the Saint-Hyacinthe Top Design.

In 2008, the team was once again renamed, becoming the Saint-Hyacinthe Chiefs. The team eventually folded permanently after the 2008–2009 season.
