= Laval Pétroliers =

Professional hockey team based in Laval, Quebec, Canada

- City: Laval, Quebec
- League: Ligue Nord-Américaine de Hockey
- Founded: 2018
- Folded: 2026
- Home arena: Colisée de Laval
- Colours: Red, black, and white
- Website: https://petroliers.lnah.com/fr/index.html

Franchise history
- 2018: Berlin BlackJacks
- 2018–2023: Les Pétroliers du Nord
- 2023–2026: Laval Pétroliers

Championships
- Playoff championships: 1 (2025-26)

Les Pétroliers de Laval or the Laval Pétroliers (formerly Pétroliers du Nord) were a professional ice hockey team based in Laval, Quebec, Canada. The team was part of the Ligue Nord-Américaine de Hockey (LNAH), and played in the league until their explusion from LNAH in 2026 Because players and staff destroyed the league's championship trophy—the Gilles-Rousseau Cup—during post-victory celebrations.

== History ==
The team was founded in 2018 as Berlin BlackJacks in Berlin, New Hampshire, but after only 12 games and a 3–8–1 record, it was replaced by the Pétroliers du Nord, owned by the Pétrole & Propane Bélanger company. After finishing the season in Saint-Jérôme, the Pétroliers moved to Laval for 2019–20.

The Pétroliers won their first LNAH title in 2026; however, immediately after their victory, the entire franchise was suspended due to destroying the league's trophy during their post-victory celebrations. On May 29, 2026, the LNAH announced that the governors of the teams had voted to expel the Pétroliers from the league effective immediately, dissolving the franchise in the process.
