= Jonquière Marquis =

- City: Saguenay, Quebec
- League: LNAH
- Founded: 2008; 18 years ago
- Home arena: Palais des Sport

Franchise history
- 1996–1997: Saint-Lin-Laurentides Gladiateurs
- 1997–1998: Sainte-Thérèse Chiefs
- 1998–2005: Laval Chiefs
- 2005–2006: Laval Summum Chiefs
- 2006–2008: St-Jean Summum Chiefs
- 2008–2009: Saguenay 98.3
- 2009–2012: Saguenay Marquis
- 2012–present: Jonquière Marquis

Championships
- Regular season titles: None
- Division titles: None
- Playoff championships: 6; 2000–2001, 2001–2002 (as Laval Chiefs); 2006–2007 (as Saint-Jean Summum Chiefs); 2012–13, 2013–14, 2016–17 (as Jonquiere Marquis)

Les Marquis De Jonquière or the Jonquière Marquis are a professional ice hockey team in the Ligue Nord-Américaine de Hockey (LNAH), which is based in the province of Quebec. They play at the Palais des Sports. The team has a long hockey history and have been known as Gladiateurs (1996–1997), Chiefs (1997–2008) and Marquis (2009–present).

== History ==
=== 1996–1997: Saint-Lin-Laurentides Gladiateurs ===
The team started as the Saint-Lin-Laurentides Gladiateurs in 1996–1997.

=== 1997–2004: The Chiefs ===
The team moved to Sainte-Thérèse, Quebec to become the Sainte-Thérèse Chiefs in 1997–1998.

It moved to Laval in 1998–1999, playing at the Colisée de Laval as the Laval Chiefs. During its time at Laval, the team won the Futura Cup in 2001–2002 and 2002–2003.

The Laval Chiefs were also featured in a 2004 documentary on the Chiefs' enforcers, Les Chiefs.

The Chiefs were part of the semi-professional QSPHL (1998–2003) and QSMHL (2003–2004).

=== 2005–2008: Summum Chiefs ===
The team was sold to Genex Communications in 2005–2006 and were rechristened the Summum Chiefs after one of Genex's magazines, Summum. Accordingly, the Laval Chiefs were renamed as the Laval Summum Chiefs for 2005–2006 season.

Genex sold the team to a group from Saint-Jean-sur-Richelieu and it moved there for the 2006–2007 season, playing at the Colisée Isabelle-Brasseur and renamed from 2006 to 2008 as the St-Jean Summum Chiefs. The Saint-Jean Summum Chiefs won the Futura Cup in 2006–2007, after having played their last two playoff series in their former home, the Colisée de Laval.

=== 2008–2012: Saguenay 98.3 / Saguenay Marquis ===
With a move to Saguenay in 2008, it became known as the Saguenay 98.3, after the local radio station that sponsored the team, CKRS-FM (at the time under ownership of Corus Entertainment.) The players were sold but not the name "Summum Chiefs", which was retained by Genex; the Chiefs name instead transferred to the Saint-Hyacinthe franchise, which became the Saint-Hyacinthe Chiefs. The Saguenay team adopted the name "Marquis" beginning in 2009.

=== 2012–present: Jonquière Marquis ===
Since 2012, the team is playing in Jonquière, a borough (arrondissement) of the city of Saguenay, Quebec and is known as the Jonquière Marquis.

== Notable players alumni ==
(As Saint-Jean Summum Chiefs)

- Patrick Boileau
- Garrett Burnett
- Patrick Côté
- David Gosselin
- Eric Lecompte
- Guillaume Lefebvre
- François Leroux
- Olivier Michaud
- Nathan Perrott
- Christian Proulx
- Sean McMorrow
