= Sorel-Tracy Éperviers =

- City: Sorel-Tracy, Quebec
- League: LNAH
- Founded: 2004
- Home arena: Colisée Cardin
- Colours: Black, red, white
- Owner(s): Christian Deschênes
- Head coach: Francis Breault
- Captain: Eric Doucet

Franchise history
- 1996–1998: Saint-Gabriel Blizzard
- 1998–2000: Joliette Blizzard
- 2000–2002: Joliette Mission
- 2002–2004: Saint-Jean-sur-Richelieu Mission
- 2004–2008: Sorel-Tracy Mission
- 2008–2010: inactive
- 2010–2011: Sorel-Tracy GCI
- 2011–2013: Sorel-Tracy HC Carvena
- 2013–present: Sorel-Tracy Éperviers

Championships
- Regular season titles: None
- Division titles: None
- Playoff championships: 3; 1996-97 (as Saint-Gabriel Blizzard); 1998-99 (as Joliette Blizzard); 2000-01 (as Joliette Mission)

Les Éperviers de Sorel-Tracy or the Sorel-Tracy Éperviers are a professional ice hockey team based in Sorel-Tracy, Quebec. The team is part of the Ligue Nord-Américaine de Hockey (LNAH). The Éperviers play at the Colisée Cardin.

Initially, the team was based in Saint-Gabriel, Quebec and was called the Blizzard. Its first season was the 1996–97 season, where they captured the Futura Cup. The team then moved to Joliette, Quebec in 1998. It changed its name from Blizzard to Mission before the 2000–01 season. During its time in Joliette, they won a further two Futura Cups in 1998-99 and 2000–01. Before the 2002–03 season, they moved to Saint-Jean-sur-Richelieu, Quebec. They played two season there, before they moved to Sorel-Tracy before the 2004–05 season.

The Sorel LNAH franchise was inactive after the 2008 season, but was officially reinstated into the league on May 21, 2010 as the Sorel-Tracy GCI, backed by new shareholders and owners, Roger Savard, owner of mining equipment manufacturer GCI Environnement, Jean-Guy Poirier, the former owner of Royal Sorel, and four players, Christian Deschênes, Gregory Dupré, Steven Low, and Jonathan Forest.

In 2011, the team changed its name to HC Carvena, after Carvena, a local cleaning and sanitation service when GCI ended its sponsorship.

In 2013, the team decide to change its name again to Sorel-Tracy Éperviers, after the former junior team Sorel Éperviers of the Quebec Major Junior Hockey League, famous for alumni Ray Bourque.
