= Ligue Nord-Américaine de Hockey =

Canadian minor-pro ice hockey league (founded 1996)

- Current season, competition or edition: 2026–27 LNAH season
- Sport: Ice hockey
- Founded: 1996
- No. of teams: 8
- Country: Canada
- Headquarters: Thetford Mines, Quebec
- Most recent champion: Laval Pétroliers (1)
- Most titles: Thetford Assurancia (4)
- Website: lnah.com

The Ligue Nord-Américaine de Hockey (LNAH, "North American Hockey League") is a professional ice hockey league based primarily in the Canadian province of Quebec. Teams in the LNAH compete for the Vertdure Cup.

== History ==
The league was founded as the Quebec Semi-Pro Hockey League (QSPHL; French: Ligue de hockey semi-professionnelle du Québec (LHSPQ)) in 1996, and became fully professional and assumed its current name in 2004. It reached its peak in terms of number of teams that season, with ten.

Due to the COVID-19 pandemic, the 2019-20 playoffs were suspended and never concluded; Thetford Assurancia was the regular season champion. The league had hoped to start the 2021 season in January, but announced in November 2020 that it would not be going forward with one.

== League play ==
Unlike higher-level minor professional leagues, such as the American Hockey League or the ECHL, the LNAH is not known for its skill level. Its teams employ many enforcers and has a rather infamous reputation for on-ice antics, primarily fisticuffs. The LNAH has a reputation as the world's toughest hockey league; a New York Times article stated that the league averaged 3.2 fights a game during the 2010–11 season, compared with 0.6 fights in the National Hockey League.

Despite this reputation, many of the players have been ex-National Hockey League or ex-American Hockey League players, including Patrick Côté, Michel Picard, Stéphane Richer, Bobby Dollas, Guillaume Lefebvre, Garrett Burnett, Daniel Shank, François Leroux, Jeremy Stevenson, Éric Fichaud, Mario Roberge, David Gosselin, Michel Ouellet, Jesse Bélanger, Donald Brashear, Yves Racine, Anthony Stewart and Juraj Kolník. During the 2004–05 NHL lockout, some NHL players -- such as Sylvain Blouin, Donald Brashear, Sébastien Caron, Mathieu Biron, Marc-André Bergeron and Sébastien Charpentier -- played the entire season in the LNAH. This is abetted by the absence of a veteran limit rule (common to other minor pro leagues in North America) which allows teams to stock up on experienced players.

The 15-round LNAH Draft is held during the summer. Players too old for junior ice hockey may be drafted even if they were already drafted by an NHL team. The league has had a rule that stipulates that all players must either have come from or played junior hockey in Quebec, though it has not been strictly used for LNAH teams based outside Quebec.

== Teams ==
=== Current ===
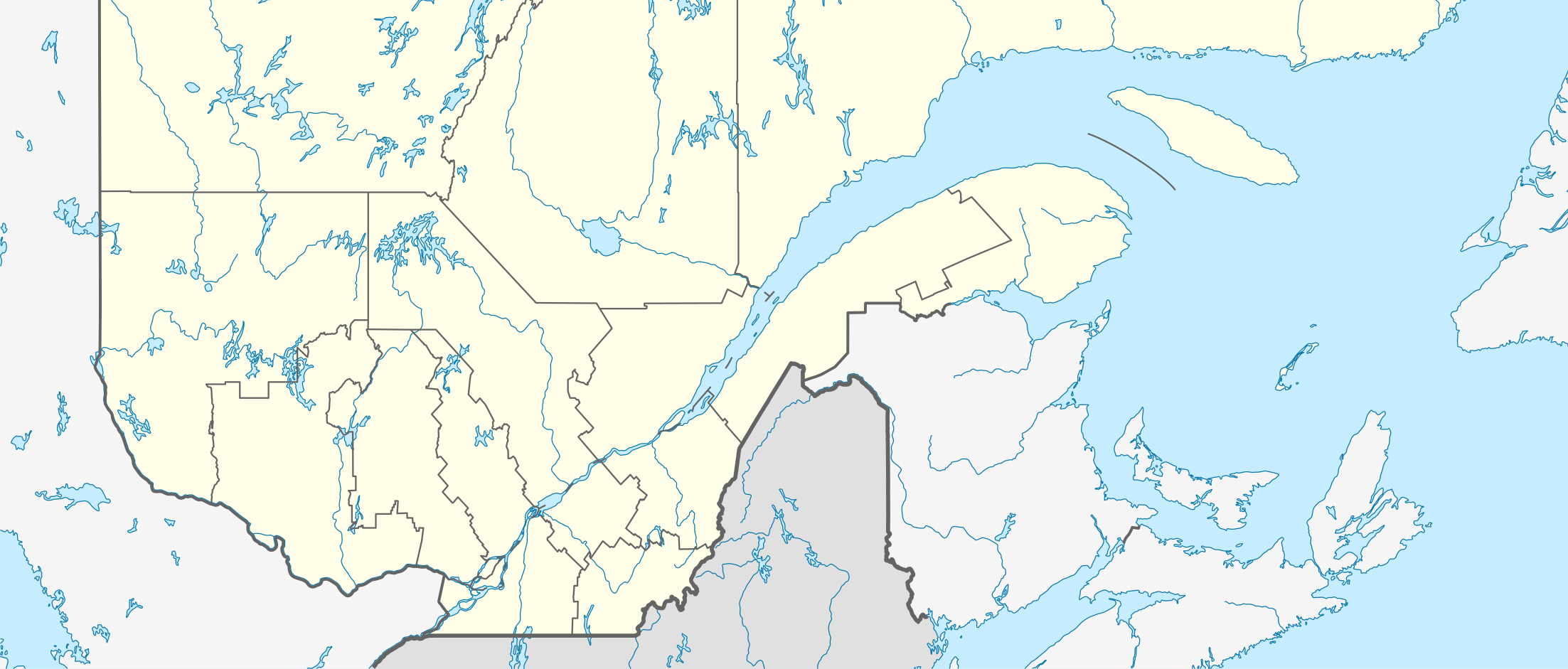
Teams currently in the LNAH.

Team	City	Arena	Joined
Jonquière Marquis	Saguenay, Quebec	Palais des Sports de Saguenay	1996 (Note: Relocated since founding; see the respective team articles for more information.)
Manotick Mariners	Ottawa, Ontario	Mike O'Neil Arena	2026 (Note: Founded in 2024 as part of the Eastern Ontario Super Hockey League; competed in the Northern Premier Hockey League during 2025-26 season.)
Québec National	L'Ancienne-Lorette, Quebec	Complexe Sportif Bonair	2024
Rivière-du-Loup 3L	Rivière-du-Loup, Quebec	Centre Premier Tech	2008
Saint-Georges Cool FM 103.5	Saint-Georges, Quebec	Centre Sportif Lacroix-Dutil	1996
Saint-Hyacinthe Bataillon	Saint-Hyacinthe, Quebec	Stade Louis-Philippe-Gaucher	2024
Sorel-Tracy Éperviers	Sorel-Tracy, Quebec	Colisée Cardin	1996
Thetford Assurancia	Thetford Mines, Quebec	Centre Mario Gosselin	1996

=== Defunct ===
- Acton Vale Beaulieu (2000–01; became Saint-Hyacinthe Cousin)
- Acton Vale Nova (1996–2000; renamed Acton Vale Beaulieu)
- Asbestos Aztèques (1997–2001; renamed Asbestos Dubé)
- Asbestos Aztèques (2002–03; folded)
- Asbestos Dubé (2001–02; renamed Asbestos Aztèques)
- Bâtisseurs de Montcalm (2022–23)
- Berlin BlackJacks (2018; team taken over by league after 10 games in New Hampshire and moved to St-Jérôme, Quebec for the remainder of the 2018-19 season as Les Pétrôliers du Nord, and then to Laval, Quebec for season 2019-20 under the same name)
- Cornwall River Kings (2012–16; folded)
- Côte-de-Beaupré As (2000–01; became Québec As and played at Charlesbourg in 2001–2002 and at Beauport in 2002–2003)
- Côte-de-Beaupré Caron et Guay (1999–2000; became Côte-de-Beaupré As)
- Granby Blitz (1997–2002; renamed Granby Prédateurs)
- Granby Prédateurs (2002–04; folded)
- Haut-Richelieu Dragons (1996–97; renamed Iberville Dragons)
- Iberville Dragons (1997–98; became Saint-Laurent Dragons)
- Joliette Blizzard (1998–2000; renamed Joliette Mission)
- Joliette Mission (2000–02; became Saint-Jean-sur-Richelieu Mission)
- Jonquière Condors (1997–2002; renamed Saguenay Paramédic)
- Lachute Rapides (1996–99; became LaSalle Rapides)
- LaSalle Rapides (1999–2003; folded)
- Laurentides Gladiateurs (1996–97; became Sainte-Thérèse Chiefs)
- Laval Chiefs (1998–2005; renamed Laval Summum-Chiefs)
- Laval Summum-Chiefs (2005–06; became Saint-Jean-sur-Richelieu Summum-Chiefs)
- Laval Braves (2013–14; renamed Laval Predateurs)
- Laval Predators (2014–17; folded)
- Laval Pétroliers (2018-2026; expelled)
- Louiseville Jets (1996–97; folded)
- Pont-Rouge Caron et Guay (2001–04; became Trois-Rivières Caron et Guay)
- Pont-Rouge Grand Portneuf (1996–2001; renamed Pont-Rouge Caron et Guay)
- Québec As (1997–98; dormant in 1998–99 and became Côte-de-Beaupré Caron et Guay)
- Québec As (2001–03; renamed Québec Radio X, then Pont-Rouge Lois Jeans)
- Rive-Sud Chacals (1996–98; became Saint-Georges Garaga)
- Rivière-du-Loup Promutuel (2001–04; folded)
- Rivière-du-Loup CIMT (2008–10; renamed Rivière-du-Loup 3L
- Saguenay 98,3 (2008–09; renamed Saguenay Marquis)
- Saguenay Fjord (2004–05; folded after 24 games)
- Saguenay Paramédic (2002–04; renamed Saguenay Fjord)
- Ste-Marie Poutrelles Delta (2008; folded during the season)
- Sainte-Thérèse Chiefs (1997–98; became Laval Chiefs)
- Saint-Gabriel Blizzard (1996–98; became Joliette Blizzard)
- Saint-Georges Garaga (1998–2005; renamed Saint-Georges CRS Express)
- Saint-Hyacinthe Chiefs (2008–09; folded)
- Saint-Hyacinthe Cousin (2001–05; renamed Saint-Hyacinthe Cristal)
- Saint-Hyacinthe Cristal (2005–06; renamed Saint-Hyacinthe Top Design)
- Saint-Hyacinthe Top Design (2006–08; renamed Saint-Hyacinthe Chiefs)
- Saint-Jean-sur-Richelieu Mission (2002–04; became Sorel-Tracy Mission)
- Saint-Jean-sur-Richelieu Summum-Chiefs (2006–08; became Saguenay 98.3)
- Saint-Laurent Dragons (1998–2001; became Verdun Dragons)
- Sherbrooke Saint-François (2003–11; became Windsor Wild)
- Sorel Dinosaures (1996–99; renamed Sorel Royaux)
- Sorel Mission (2004–08)
- Sorel Royaux (1999–2004; folded)
- Sorel-Tracy GCI (2010–11)
- Thetford Mines Coyotes (1996–2000; renamed Thetford Mines Prolab)
- Thetford Mines Isothermic (2007–15; renamed Thetford Assurancia)
- Thetford Mines Prolab (2000–07; renamed Thetford Mines Isothermic)
- Trois-Rivières Blizzard (2014–17; renamed Trois-Rivières Draveurs)
- Trois-Rivières Draveurs (2017–18; membership revoked)
- Trois-Rivières Viking (2003–04; folded)
- Valleyfield Braves (2013; became Laval Braves partway through 2013–14 season)
- Vanier Voyageurs (1996–97; became Québec As and played at Val-Bélair)
- Verdun Dragons (2001–05; renamed Verdun-Montréal Dragons)
- Verdun-Montréal Dragons (2005–06; folded)
- Waterloo 94 (1996–97; became Granby Blitz)
- Windsor Lacroix (2001–03; became Sherbrooke Saint-François)
- Windsor Papetiers (1996–2001; renamed Windsor Lacroix)
- Windsor Wild (2011–12; became Cornwall River Kings)

== Champions ==
The Vertdure Cup is the trophy awarded annually to champions of the LNAH. It was first awarded after the 1996–97 season, and was originally called the Futura Cup. In 2011, it was renamed the Canam Cup, and in 2014 as the Vertdure Cup. It was renamed the Evirum Cup for the 2023–24 season and the Gilles-Rousseau Cup for the 2024-25 season.

Season	Champion	Runner-up
1996–97	Saint-Gabriel Blizzard	Acton Vale Nova
1997–98	Lachute Rapides	Acton Vale Nova
1998–99	Joliette Blizzard	Saint-Georges Garaga
1999–00	LaSalle Rapides	Pont-Rouge Grand Portneuf
2000–01	Joliette Mission	Saint-Georges Garaga
2001–02	Laval Chiefs	Thetford Mines Prolab
2002–03	Laval Chiefs	Thetford Mines Prolab
2003–04	Verdun Dragons	Saint-Georges Garaga
2004–05	Québec Radio X	Thetford Mines Prolab
2005–06	Sherbrooke Saint-François	Thetford Mines Prolab
2006–07	Saint-Jean-sur-Richelieu Summum Chiefs	Sherbrooke Saint-Francois
2007–08	Trois-Rivières Caron & Guay	Thetford Mines Isothermic
2008–09	Pont-Rouge Lois Jeans	Thetford Mines Isothermic
2009–10	Saint-Georges CRS Express	Sherbrooke Saint-Francois
2010–11	Sherbrooke Saint-François	Saint-Georges Cool FM 103.5
2011–12	Thetford Mines Isothermic	Windsor Wild
2012–13	Jonquière Marquis	Sorel-Tracy HC Carvena
2013–14	Jonquière Marquis	Thetford Mines Isothermic
2014–15	Thetford Mines Isothermic	Sorel-Tracy Éperviers
2015–16	Rivière-du-Loup 3L	Sorel-Tracy Éperviers
2016–17	Jonquière Marquis	Thetford Assurancia
2017–18	Sorel-Tracy Éperviers	Rivière-du-Loup 3L
2018–19	Sorel-Tracy Éperviers	Jonquière Marquis
2019–20	Not awarded; season cancelled due to COVID-19 pandemic	
2020–21	Not awarded; season cancelled due to COVID-19 pandemic	
2021–22	Thetford Assurancia	Les Pétroliers du Nord
2022–23	Saint-Georges Cool FM 103.5	Thetford Assurancia
2023–24	Thetford Assurancia	Rivière-du-Loup 3L
2024–25	Sorel-Tracy Éperviers	Rivière-du-Loup 3L
2025–26	Laval Pétroliers	Saint-Hyacinthe Bataillon

== LNAH Finals appearances by city ==
Note: Cities listed in yellow are currently home to an LNAH franchise.

City	Finals	Won	Lost	Years won	Years lost	Team(s) in Finals	Years in LNAH
Thetford Mines	13	4	9	2012, 2015, 2022, 2024	2002, 2003, 2005, 2006, 2008, 2009, 2014, 2017, 2023	Prolab, Isothermic, Assurancia	1996–present
Sorel-Tracy	6	3	3	2018, 2019, 2025	2013, 2015, 2016	HC Carvena, Éperviers	1996–2008, 2010–present
Saint-Georges	6	2	4	2010, 2023	1999, 2001, 2004, 2011	Garaga, CRS Express, Cool FM 103.5	1998–present
Sherbrooke	4	2	2	2006, 2011	2007, 2010	Saint-Francois	2003–2011
Jonquière	4	3	1	2013, 2014, 2017	2019	Marquis	1997–2004, 2008–present
Laval	4	3	1	2002, 2003, 2026	2022	Chiefs, Pétroliers	1998–2006, 2013–17, 2019–2026
Rivière-du-Loup	4	1	3	2016	2018, 2024, 2025	3L	2008–present
Joliette	2	2	0	1999, 2001		Blizzard, Mission	1998–2002
Pont-Rouge	2	1	1	2009	2000	Grand Portneuf, Lois Jeans	1996–2004, 2008–2010
Acton Vale	2	0	2		1997, 1998	Nova	1996–2001
Trois-Rivières	1	1	0	2008		Caron & Guay	2003–2018
Saint-Jean-sur-Richelieu	1	1	0	2007		Summum Chiefs	2002–2004, 2006–2008
Québec	1	1	0	2005		Radio X	1997–1998, 2001–2008
Verdun	1	1	0	2004		Dragons	2001–2006
LaSalle	1	1	0	2000		Rapides	1999–2003
Lachute	1	1	0	1998		Rapides	1996–1999
Saint-Gabriel	1	1	0	1997		Blizzard	1996–1998
Saint-Hyacinthe	1	0	1		2026	Bataillon	2024–Present
Windsor	1	0	1		2012	Wild	2011–2012
