= Telus Cup – Defensive =

- Description: Annual ice hockey award presented to the best defensive player in the Quebec Major Junior Hockey League
- Country: Canada
- Presented by: Quebec Major Junior Hockey League

The Telus Cup – Defensive is awarded annually to the person voted the best defensive player in the Quebec Major Junior Hockey League. It was known as the Shell Cup from 1989–90 to 1993–94, and as the Ford Cup from 1994–95 to 1996–97.

== Winners ==
Season	Player	Team
Shell Cup – Defensive
1989–90	Pierre Gagnon	Victoriaville Tigres
1990–91	Félix Potvin	Chicoutimi Saguenéens
1991–92	Jean-François Labbé	Trois-Rivières Draveurs
1992–93	Jocelyn Thibault	Sherbrooke Faucons
1993–94	Steve Gosselin	Chicoutimi Saguenéens
Ford Cup – Defensive
1994–95	José Théodore	Hull Olympiques
1995–96	Christian Laflamme	Beauport Harfangs
1996–97	Jean-Sébastien Giguère	Halifax Mooseheads
Telus Cup – Defensive
1997–98	Mathieu Garon	Victoriaville Tigres
1998–99	Mathieu Chouinard	Shawinigan Cataractes
1999–2000	Simon Lajeunesse	Moncton Wildcats
2000–01	Maxime Ouellet	Rouyn-Noranda Huskies
2001–02	Éric Lafrance	Hull Olympiques
2001–02	Jean-François Racine	Drummondville Voltigeurs
2002–03	Marc-André Fleury	Cape Breton Screaming Eagles
2003–04	Corey Crawford	Moncton Wildcats
2004–05	Martin Houle	Cape Breton Screaming Eagles
2005–06	Keith Yandle	Moncton Wildcats
