= Michel Brière Memorial Trophy =

Annual ice hockey award in Canada

The Michel Brière Memorial Trophy (French: Trophée Michel Brière) is awarded annually to the most valuable player in the Quebec Maritimes Junior Hockey League (QMJHL). It is named for former QMJHL and National Hockey League (NHL) player Michel Brière, who was killed in a car crash.

== Winners ==
List of winners of the Michel Brière Memorial Trophy.

Also named CHL Player of the Year

Season	Winner	Team	Goals	Assists	Points
1972–73	André Savard	Quebec Remparts	67	84	151
1973–74	Gary MacGregor	Cornwall Royals	100	74	174
1974–75	Mario Viens	Cornwall Royals	Goalkeeper		
1975–76	Peter Marsh	Sherbrooke Castors	75	81	156
1976–77	Lucien DeBlois	Sorel Éperviers	56	78	134
1977–78	Kevin Reeves	Montreal Juniors	62	109	171
1978–79	Pierre Lacroix	Trois-Rivières Draveurs	37	100	137
1979–80	Denis Savard	Montreal Juniors	46	112	158
1980–81	Dale Hawerchuk	Cornwall Royals	81	102	183
1981–82	John Chabot	Sherbrooke Castors	34	109	143
1982–83	Pat LaFontaine	Verdun Juniors	104	130	234
1983–84	Mario Lemieux	Laval Voisins	133	149	282
1984–85	Daniel Berthiaume	Chicoutimi Saguenéens	Goalkeeper		
1985–86	Guy Rouleau	Hull Olympiques	91	100	191
1986–87	Robert Desjardins	Longueuil Chevaliers	Goalkeeper		
1987–88	Marc Saumier	Hull Olympiques	52	114	166
1988–89	Stéphane Morin	Chicoutimi Saguenéens	77	109	186
1989–90	Andrew McKim	Hull Olympiques	66	64	130
1990–91	Yanic Perreault	Trois-Rivières Draveurs	87	98	185
1991–92	Charles Poulin	Saint-Hyacinthe Laser	38	97	135
1992–93	Jocelyn Thibault	Sherbrooke Faucons	Goalkeeper		
1993–94	Manny Fernandez	Laval Titan	Goalkeeper		
1994–95	Frédéric Chartier	Laval Titan Collège Français	51	59	110
1995–96	Christian Dubé	Sherbrooke Faucons	52	93	145
1996–97	Daniel Corso	Victoriaville Tigres	51	68	119
1997–98	Ramzi Abid	Chicoutimi Saguenéens	50	85	135
1998–99	Mathieu Chouinard	Shawinigan Cataractes	Goalkeeper		
1999–2000	Brad Richards	Rimouski Océanic	71	115	186
2000–01	Simon Gamache	Val–d'Or Foreurs	74	110	184
2001–02	Pierre-Marc Bouchard	Chicoutimi Saguenéens	46	94	140
2002–03	Joël Perrault	Baie–Comeau Drakkar	51	65	116
2003–04	Sidney Crosby	Rimouski Océanic	54	81	135
2004–05	Sidney Crosby	Rimouski Océanic	66	102	168
2005–06	Alexander Radulov	Quebec Remparts	61	91	152
2006–07	Mathieu Perreault	Acadie-Bathurst Titan	41	78	119
2007–08	Francis Paré	Chicoutimi Saguenéens	54	48	102
2008–09	Nicola Riopel	Moncton Wildcats	Goalkeeper		
2009–10	Mike Hoffman	Saint John Sea Dogs	46	39	85
2010–11	Sean Couturier	Drummondville Voltigeurs	36	60	96
2011–12	Yanni Gourde	Victoriaville Tigres	37	87	124
2012–13	Jonathan Drouin	Halifax Mooseheads	41	64	105
2013–14	Anthony Mantha	Val-d'Or Foreurs	57	63	120
2014–15	Conor Garland	Moncton Wildcats	35	94	129
2015–16	Francis Perron	Rouyn-Noranda Huskies	41	67	108
2016–17	Vitalii Abramov	Gatineau Olympiques	46	58	104
2017–18	Alex Barré-Boulet	Blainville-Boisbriand Armada	53	63	116
2018–19	Alexis Lafrenière	Rimouski Océanic	37	68	105
2019–20	Alexis Lafrenière	Rimouski Océanic	35	77	112
2020–21	Cédric Desruisseaux	Charlottetown Islanders	42	36	78
2021–22	William Dufour	Saint John Sea Dogs	56	60	116
2022–23	Jordan Dumais	Halifax Mooseheads	54	86	140
2023–24	Mathieu Cataford	Halifax Mooseheads	40	50	90
2024–25	Jonathan Fauchon	Blainville-Boisbriand Armada/Rimouski Océanic	46	57	103
2025–26	Maxim Massé	Chicoutimi Saguenéens	51	51	102

== See also ==
- Red Tilson Trophy - Ontario Hockey League Player of the Year
- Four Broncos Memorial Trophy - Western Hockey League Player of the Year
- List of Canadian Hockey League awards
