= Christian Daigle =

Canadian ice hockey agent (1978–2021)

Christian Daigle (1 February 1978 – 29 January 2021) was a certified NHL Player Agent and the president at Momentum Hockey. He worked with Momentum's clients and their families for over fifteen years.

Daigle was born in Saint-Hubert, Quebec. He played in the Quebec Major Junior Hockey League (QMJHL) for four years, most notably with the Val-d'Or Foreurs in his final two seasons. While with the Foreurs, he helped his team make it to the Memorial Cup Tournament in the 1997-98 season, and he was named captain the following year. Following his career in the QMJHL, he completed his undergraduate studies at HEC Montréal.

== Career statistics ==
			Regular season					Playoffs
Season	Team	League	GP	G	A	Pts	PIM	GP	G	A	Pts	PIM
1995–96	Hull Olympiques	QMJHL	46	8	9	17	29	0	0	0	0	0
1995–96	Moncton Alpines	QMJHL	18	8	2	10	6	0	0	0	0	0
1996–97	Moncton Wildcats	QMJHL	46	23	40	63	85	0	0	0	0	0
1996–97	Granby Prédateurs	QMJHL	19	7	8	15	16	5	2	3	5	6
1997–98	Val-d'Or Foreurs	QMJHL	27	14	24	38	19	19	15	23	38	37
1998–99	Val-d'Or Foreurs	QMJHL	54	33	58	91	64	6	4	5	9	0
1999–00	Laval Chiefs	QSPHL	4	2	1	3	4	0	0	0	0	0
