= Jean Béliveau Trophy =

Award in Quebec Maritimes Junior Hockey League

The Jean Béliveau Trophy is awarded to the top regular season scorer of the Quebec Maritimes Junior Hockey League (QMJHL). The award is named after Quebec native Jean Béliveau, a member of the Hockey Hall of Fame, who died on December 2, 2014, at the age of 83.

== Winners ==
| Season | Player | Team | Points |
|---|---|---|---|
| 1969–70 | Luc Simard | Trois-Rivières Ducs | 174 |
| 1970–71 | Guy Lafleur | Quebec Remparts | 209 |
| 1971–72 | Jacques Richard | Quebec Remparts | 160 |
| 1972–73 | André Savard | Quebec Remparts | 151 |
| 1973–74 | Pierre Larouche | Sorel Éperviers | 251 |
| 1974–75 | Norm Dupont | Montreal Bleu Blanc Rouge | 158 |
| 1975–76 | Sylvain Locas | Chicoutimi Saguenéens | 160 |
| 1975–76 | Richard Dalpe | Trois-Rivières Draveurs | 160 |
| 1976–77 | Jean Savard | Quebec Remparts | 180 |
| 1977–78 | Ron Carter | Sherbrooke Castors | 174 |
| 1978–79 | Jean-François Sauvé | Trois-Rivières Draveurs | 176 |
| 1979–80 | Jean-François Sauvé | Trois-Rivières Draveurs | 187 |
| 1980–81 | Dale Hawerchuk | Cornwall Royals | 183 |
| 1981–82 | Claude Verret | Trois-Rivières Draveurs | 162 |
| 1982–83 | Pat LaFontaine | Verdun Juniors | 234 |
| 1983–84 | Mario Lemieux | Laval Voisins | 282 |
| 1984–85 | Guy Rouleau | Longueuil Chevaliers | 163 |
| 1985–86 | Guy Rouleau | Longueuil Chevaliers | 191 |
| 1986–87 | Marc Fortier | Chicoutimi Saguenéens | 201 |
| 1987–88 | Patrice Lefebvre | Shawinigan Cataractes | 200 |
| 1988–89 | Stéphane Morin | Chicoutimi Saguenéens | 186 |
| 1989–90 | Patrick Lebeau | Victoriaville Tigres | 174 |
| 1990–91 | Yanic Perreault | Trois-Rivières Draveurs | 185 |
| 1991–92 | Patrick Poulin | Saint-Hyacinthe Laser | 138 |
| 1992–93 | René Corbet | Drummondville Voltigeurs | 148 |
| 1993–94 | Yanick Dubé | Laval Titan | 141 |
| 1994–95 | Patrick Carignan | Shawinigan Cataractes | 137 |
| 1995–96 | Daniel Brière | Drummondville Voltigeurs | 163 |
| 1996–97 | Pavel Rosa | Hull Olympiques | 152 |
| 1997–98 | Ramzi Abid | Chicoutimi Saguenéens | 135 |
| 1998–99 | Mike Ribeiro | Rouyn-Noranda Huskies | 167 |
| 1999–2000 | Brad Richards | Rimouski Océanic | 186 |
| 2000–01 | Simon Gamache | Val-d'Or Foreurs | 184 |
| 2001–02 | Pierre-Marc Bouchard | Chicoutimi Saguenéens | 140 |
| 2002–03 | Joël Perrault | Baie-Comeau Drakkar | 116 |
| 2003–04 | Sidney Crosby | Rimouski Océanic | 135 |
| 2004–05 | Sidney Crosby | Rimouski Océanic | 168 |
| 2005–06 | Alexander Radulov | Quebec Remparts | 152 |
| 2006–07 | François Bouchard | Baie-Comeau Drakkar | 125 |
| 2007–08 | Mathieu Perreault | Acadie–Bathurst Titan | 114 |
| 2008–09 | Yannick Riendeau | Drummondville Voltigeurs | 126 |
| 2009–10 | Sean Couturier | Drummondville Voltigeurs | 96 |
| 2010–11 | Philip-Michael Devos | Gatineau Olympiques | 114 |
| 2011–12 | Yanni Gourde | Victoriaville Tigres | 124 |
| 2012–13 | Ben Duffy | P.E.I. Rocket | 110 |
| 2013–14 | Anthony Mantha | Val-d'Or Foreurs | 120 |
| 2014–15 | Conor Garland | Moncton Wildcats | 129 |
| 2015–16 | Conor Garland | Moncton Wildcats | 128 |
| 2016–17 | Vitalii Abramov | Gatineau Olympiques | 104 |
| 2017–18 | Alex Barré-Boulet | Blainville-Boisbriand Armada | 116 |
| 2018–19 | Peter Abbandonato | Rouyn-Noranda Huskies | 111 |
| 2019–20 | Alexis Lafrenière | Rimouski Océanic | 112 |
| 2020–21 | Cédric Desruisseaux | Charlottetown Islanders | 78 |
| 2021–22 | Joshua Roy | Sherbrooke Phoenix | 119 |
| 2022–23 | Jordan Dumais | Halifax Mooseheads | 140 |
| 2023–24 | Antonin Verreault | Rouyn-Noranda Huskies | 107 |
| 2024–25 | Jonathan Fauchon | Blainville-Boisbriand Armada/Rimouski Océanic | 103 |
| 2025–26 | Maxim Massé | Chicoutimi Saguenéens | 102 |
