= Ramzi Abid =

Canadian ice hockey player (born 1980)

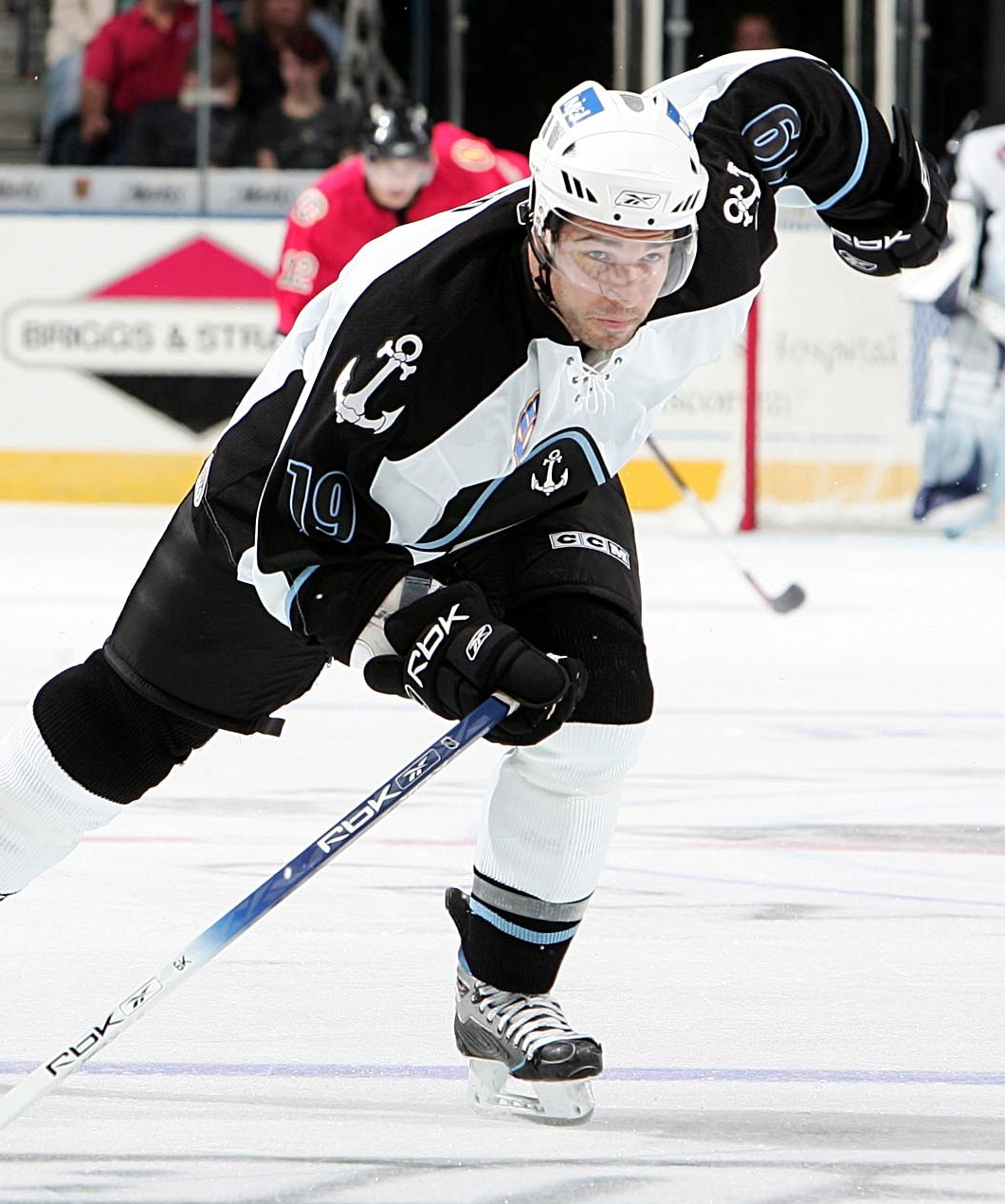
- Abid with the Milwaukee Admirals in 2006
- Born: March 24, 1980 (age 46) Montreal, Quebec, Canada
- Height: 6 ft 2 in (188 cm)
- Weight: 210 lb (95 kg; 15 st 0 lb)
- Position: Left wing
- Shot: Left
- Played for: Phoenix Coyotes; Pittsburgh Penguins; Atlanta Thrashers; Nashville Predators; SC Bern; Rapperswil-Jona; Traktor Chelyabinsk; Rögle BK; EC Red Bull Salzburg; JYP; Grizzly Adams Wolfsburg
- NHL draft: 28th overall, 1998; Colorado Avalanche; 85th overall, 2000; Phoenix Coyotes
- Playing career: 2000–2014

Ramzi Abid (born March 24, 1980) is a Canadian former professional ice hockey player of Tunisian descent, who played in the National Hockey League (NHL) with the Phoenix Coyotes, Pittsburgh Penguins, Atlanta Thrashers and the Nashville Predators.

== Playing career ==
As a youth, Abid played in the 1994 Quebec International Pee-Wee Hockey Tournament with a minor ice hockey team from Longueuil, Quebec.

Typically playing as a left winger, Ramzi Abid was selected by the Colorado Avalanche as the first choice in the second round (28th overall) of the 1998 NHL entry draft and was redrafted in the 2000 NHL entry draft, 85th overall, by the Phoenix Coyotes, who on March 11, 2003, traded him to the Pittsburgh Penguins with Dan Focht and Guillaume Lefebvre for Jan Hrdina and François Leroux .

In March 2003, he successfully underwent surgery to repair a torn ACL and missed the remainder of the 2002–03 season. He played for the Wilkes-Barre/Scranton Penguins, an affiliate team of the Pittsburgh Penguins, in the American Hockey League during the 2004–05 NHL lockout. Abid spent the 2005–06 season with the Atlanta Thrashers.

On July 21, 2006, Abid signed a one-year contract with the Nashville Predators. Abid had an impressive pre-season, in which he scored a hat-trick in an 8-1 win over the Blue Jackets on September 21, 2006. Abid was then sent to affiliate, the Milwaukee Admirals, prior to the start of the 2006-07 season. Abid played 13 games with the Predators as an injury replacement during the season. On April 18, 2007, Ramzi was called up to the Predators and made his play-off debut against the San Jose Sharks in the Western Conference Quarterfinals.

Abid was a member of Team Canada in the 2007 Spengler Cup. In 2007, Abid signed with SC Bern to play through the 2009-10 season. He played two seasons for SC Bern before his contract was dissolved in April 2009.

In August 2009, he signed with Traktor Chelyabinsk of the Kontinental Hockey League for the 2009–10 season. After 33 games with Traktor he left the KHL on January 31, 2010. On February 1, 2010, Abid agreed to a contract with Rögle BK.

On June 11, 2010, Abid again a free agent, signed a one-year contract with EC Red Bull Salzburg that also included a one-year option, a team playing in the EBEL.

After a second season with Red Bull, Abid was again on the move within Europe, signing a one-year contract with JYP of the Finnish SM-liiga on July 23, 2012. In his first season with the Finnish club, Abid contributed with a team leading 22 goals and 42 points in 56 games and was signed to a one-year extension at the midpoint of the season.

Abid struggled in his return campaign in 2013–14 with JYP, posting 3 goals in 21 games before he was mutually released from his contract and signed in the German DEL with Grizzly Adams Wolfsburg on December 18, 2013.

== Career statistics ==
			Regular season					Playoffs
Season	Team	League	GP	G	A	Pts	PIM	GP	G	A	Pts	PIM
1995–96	Collège Charles–Lemoyne	QMAAA	42	10	14	24	18	4	1	2	3	2
1996–97	Chicoutimi Saguenéens	QMJHL	65	13	24	37	151	21	2	12	14	28
1996–97	Chicoutimi Saguenéens	MC	—	—	—	—	—	3	0	1	1	7
1997–98	Chicoutimi Saguenéens	QMJHL	68	50	85	135	266	6	3	4	7	10
1998–99	Chicoutimi Saguenéens	QMJHL	21	11	15	26	97	—	—	—	—	—
1998–99	Acadie–Bathurst Titan	QMJHL	24	14	22	36	102	23	14	20	34	84
1998–99	Acadie–Bathurst Titan	MC	—	—	—	—	—	3	1	0	1	10
1999–2000	Acadie–Bathurst Titan	QMJHL	13	10	11	21	61	—	—	—	—	—
1999–2000	Halifax Mooseheads	QMJHL	59	57	80	137	148	10	10	13	23	18
1999–2000	Halifax Mooseheads	MC	—	—	—	—	—	4	6	4	10	8
2000–01	Springfield Falcons	AHL	17	6	4	10	38	—	—	—	—	—
2001–02	Springfield Falcons	AHL	66	18	25	43	214	—	—	—	—	—
2002–03	Phoenix Coyotes	NHL	30	10	8	18	30	—	—	—	—	—
2002–03	Springfield Falcons	AHL	27	15	10	25	50	—	—	—	—	—
2002–03	Pittsburgh Penguins	NHL	3	0	0	0	2	—	—	—	—	—
2003–04	Pittsburgh Penguins	NHL	16	3	2	5	27	—	—	—	—	—
2004–05	Wilkes–Barre/Scranton Penguins	AHL	78	26	29	55	119	7	0	2	2	18
2005–06	Atlanta Thrashers	NHL	6	0	2	2	6	—	—	—	—	—
2005–06	Chicago Wolves	AHL	75	34	42	76	165	—	—	—	—	—
2006–07	Nashville Predators	NHL	13	1	4	5	13	2	0	0	0	0
2006–07	Milwaukee Admirals	AHL	57	19	30	49	70	2	0	1	1	6
2007–08	SC Bern	NLA	41	20	11	31	56	5	3	2	5	14
2008–09	SC Bern	NLA	31	9	20	29	85	1	0	0	0	12
2008–09	Rapperswil–Jona Lakers	NLA	2	0	2	2	2	—	—	—	—	—
2009–10	Traktor Chelyabinsk	KHL	33	3	8	11	36	—	—	—	—	—
2009–10	Rögle BK	SEL	10	1	7	8	8	—	—	—	—	—
2010–11	EC Salzburg	AUT	48	13	18	31	120	17	5	12	17	24
2011–12	EC Salzburg	AUT	48	21	25	46	92	6	1	4	5	16
2012–13	JYP	SM-l	56	22	20	42	82	11	0	3	3	32
2013–14	JYP	Liiga	21	3	5	8	29	—	—	—	—	—
2013–14	Grizzly Adams Wolfsburg	DEL	24	2	17	19	52	10	5	5	10	18
AHL totals			320	118	140	258	656	9	0	3	3	24
NHL totals			68	14	16	30	78	2	0	0	0	0

== Awards and honours ==
Award	Year
QMJHL
First All-Star Team	1998, 2000
Jean Béliveau Trophy	1998
Michel Brière Memorial Trophy	1998
CHL First All-Star Team	2000
Ed Chynoweth Trophy	2000

== Transactions ==
- On June 27, 1998 the Colorado Avalanche drafted Ramzi Abid in the second-round (#28 overall) of the 1998 NHL draft.
- On June 24, 2000 the Phoenix Coyotes drafted Ramzi Abid in the third-round (#85 overall) of the 2000 NHL draft.
- On July 24, 2000 the Phoenix Coyotes signed Ramzi Abid to a 3-year contract.
- On March 11, 2003 the Phoenix Coyotes traded Ramzi Abid, Dan Focht and Guillaume Lefebvre to the Pittsburgh Penguins in exchange for Jan Hrdina and Francois Leroux.
- On September 11, 2003 the Pittsburgh Penguins resigned Ramzi Abid.
- On August 3, 2004 the Pittsburgh Penguins resigned Ramzi Abid.
- On August 8, 2005 the Atlanta Thrashers signed unrestricted free agent Ramzi Abid.
- On July 21, 2006 the Nashville Predators signed unrestricted free agent Ramzi Abid to a 1-year contract.
- On July 10, 2007 the SC Bern signed Ramzi Abid.
