= Francis Lessard =

Canadian ice hockey player (born 1979)

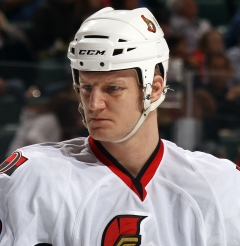
- Lessard with the Ottawa Senators in 2013
- Born: May 30, 1979 (age 46); Montreal, Quebec, Canada
- Height: 6 ft 2 in (188 cm)
- Weight: 225 lb (102 kg; 16 st 1 lb)
- Position: Right wing
- Shot: Right
- Played for: Atlanta Thrashers; Ottawa Senators
- NHL draft: 80th overall, 1997; Carolina Hurricanes
- Playing career: 1999–2016

Francis Lessard (born May 30, 1979) is a retired Canadian professional ice hockey forward who most recently played for the Trois-Rivières Blizzard in the Ligue Nord-Américaine de Hockey (LNAH). While he had stints in the NHL with the Atlanta Thrashers and Ottawa Senators, the majority of his career was spent in the American Hockey League (AHL). He was widely recognized for his role as an enforcer, known for his tough, physical play and for defending his teammates on the ice.

== Playing career ==
As a young hockey player, Lessard showcased his developing talent on a prominent stage by participating in the prestigious Quebec International Pee-Wee Hockey Tournaments in both 1992 and 1993. Representing the Rive-Nord Elites, a well-regarded minor ice hockey team, Lessard competed against top youth players from across North America and around the world.

Selected from the QMJHL's Val-d'Or Foreurs, Lessard had his rights traded to the Philadelphia Flyers in 1999 while still playing junior hockey. He went on to play three seasons with the Flyers' AHL affiliate, the Philadelphia Phantoms, before being traded to the Atlanta Thrashers.

Lessard broke into the NHL with the Thrashers during the 2001–02 season, the same year he captured a Calder Cup title with the Chicago Wolves. Over four seasons, he appeared in 91 games for the Thrashers before joining the New York Rangers organization in 2006. He then spent two seasons with their AHL affiliate, the Hartford Wolf Pack, before signing with the Phoenix Coyotes in 2008 and playing two more AHL seasons with the San Antonio Rampage. In August 2010, Lessard signed with the Ottawa Senators.

== Career statistics ==
			Regular season					Playoffs
Season	Team	League	GP	G	A	Pts	PIM	GP	G	A	Pts	PIM
1996–97	Val-d'Or Foreurs	QMJHL	66	1	9	10	312	—	—	—	—	—
1997–98	Val-d'Or Foreurs	QMJHL	63	3	20	23	338	19	1	6	7	101
1998–99	Drummondville Voltigeurs	QMJHL	53	12	36	48	295	—	—	—	—	—
1999–00	Philadelphia Phantoms	AHL	78	4	8	12	416	5	0	1	1	7
2000–01	Philadelphia Phantoms	AHL	64	3	7	10	330	10	0	0	0	33
2001–02	Philadelphia Phantoms	AHL	60	0	6	6	251	—	—	—	—	—
2001–02	Atlanta Thrashers	NHL	5	0	0	0	26	—	—	—	—	—
2001–02	Chicago Wolves	AHL	7	2	1	3	34	15	0	1	1	40
2002–03	Atlanta Thrashers	NHL	18	0	2	2	61	—	—	—	—	—
2002–03	Chicago Wolves	AHL	50	2	5	7	194	1	0	0	0	0
2003–04	Atlanta Thrashers	NHL	62	1	1	2	181	—	—	—	—	—
2005–06	Atlanta Thrashers	NHL	6	0	0	0	0	—	—	—	—	—
2005–06	Chicago Wolves	AHL	36	2	3	5	161	—	—	—	—	—
2006–07	Hartford Wolf Pack	AHL	58	3	6	9	309	—	—	—	—	—
2007–08	Hartford Wolf Pack	AHL	14	4	1	5	49	—	—	—	—	—
2008–09	San Antonio Rampage	AHL	59	2	2	4	324	—	—	—	—	—
2009–10	San Antonio Rampage	AHL	61	2	2	4	289	—	—	—	—	—
2010–11	Binghamton Senators	AHL	36	2	1	3	187	—	—	—	—	—
2010–11	Ottawa Senators	NHL	24	0	0	0	78	—	—	—	—	—
2011–12	Binghamton Senators	AHL	43	1	1	2	138	—	—	—	—	—
2012–13	Cornwall River Kings	LNAH	36	2	8	10	147	9	2	1	3	48
2013–14	Cornwall River Kings	LNAH	31	3	6	9	192	6	0	1	1	22
2014–15	Cornwall River Kings	LNAH	15	4	2	6	81	—	—	—	—	—
AHL totals			566	27	43	70	2682	16	0	1	1	40
NHL totals			115	1	3	4	346	—	—	—	—	—

== Awards and honours ==
- 1997-98 - Memorial Cup All-Star Team

== Transactions ==
- August 8, 2010 - Signed as an unrestricted free agent by the Ottawa Senators.
- July 3, 2008 - Signed as a free agent by the Phoenix Coyotes.
- September 13, 2006 - Invited by the New York Rangers to training camp.
- March 15, 2002 - Atlanta Thrashers traded David Harlock and third-round (Tyler Redenbach) and seventh-round (Joe Pavelski) selections in 2003 to the Philadelphia Flyers for Francis Lessard.
- May 25, 1999 - Carolina Hurricanes traded Francis Lessard to the Philadelphia Flyers for an eighth-round selection (Antti Jokella) in 1999.
- June 21, 1997 - Drafted by the Carolina Hurricanes in the third round (80th overall) in 1997.
