= Mike Ribeiro =

Canadian ice hockey player (born 1980)

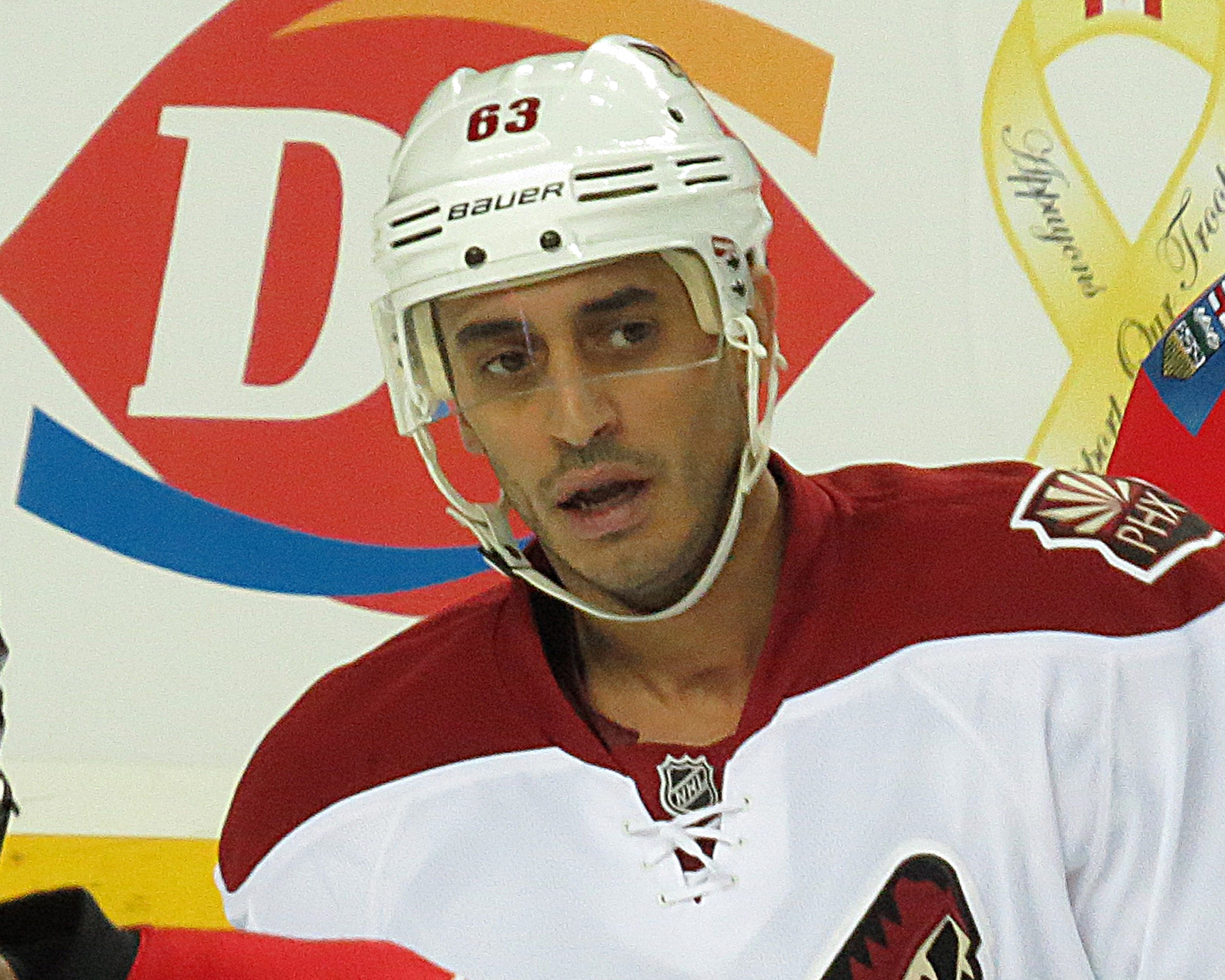
- Ribeiro with the Phoenix Coyotes in 2014
- Born: February 10, 1980 (age 46) Montreal, Quebec, Canada
- Height: 6 ft 0 in (183 cm)
- Weight: 180 lb (82 kg; 12 st 12 lb)
- Position: Centre
- Shot: Left
- Played for: Montreal Canadiens; Espoo Blues; Dallas Stars; Washington Capitals; Phoenix Coyotes; Nashville Predators
- NHL draft: 45th overall, 1998; Montreal Canadiens
- Playing career: 1999–2017

Michael Tavares Ribeiro (born February 10, 1980) is a Canadian former professional ice hockey centre. Originally selected by the Montreal Canadiens in the second round, 45th overall, of the 1998 NHL entry draft, Ribeiro has played in the NHL for the Canadiens, Dallas Stars, Washington Capitals, Phoenix Coyotes and the Nashville Predators.

== Playing career ==
=== Amateur ===
As a youth, Ribeiro played in the 1993 and 1994 Quebec International Pee-Wee Hockey Tournaments with a minor ice hockey team from Hochelaga-Maisonneuve.

=== Montreal Canadiens, Dallas Stars ===
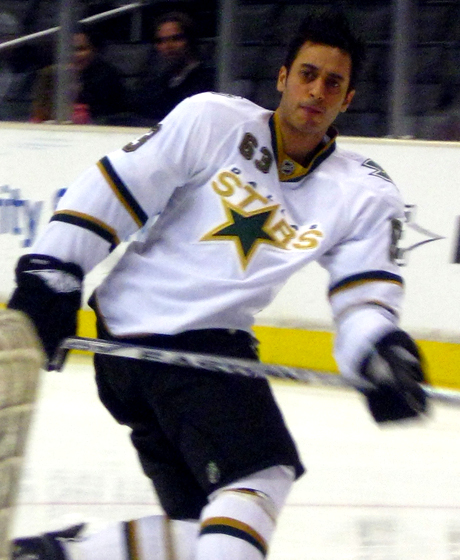
Ribeiro with the Dallas Stars.

Ribeiro was drafted 45th overall by the Montreal Canadiens in the second round of the 1998 NHL entry draft. On September 30, 2006, the Canadiens traded Ribeiro and a sixth-round draft pick in 2008 to the Dallas Stars in exchange for Janne Niinimaa and a fifth-round draft pick in 2007.

In the 2006–07 season, Ribeiro led Dallas in points, with 59. On July 12, the Stars signed Ribeiro to a one-year, $2.8 million contract extension for the 2007–08 season.

On January 7, 2008, Ribeiro and the Stars agreed to a new five-year, $25 million contract extension. Ribeiro went on to establish career highs in goals (27), assists (56) and points (83) that season and earned his first NHL All-Star Game appearance.

The 2008–09 season also saw Ribeiro breakout in the shootout, particularly with highlight reel performances in games against the Los Angeles Kings and the Colorado Avalanche.

=== Washington Capitals ===
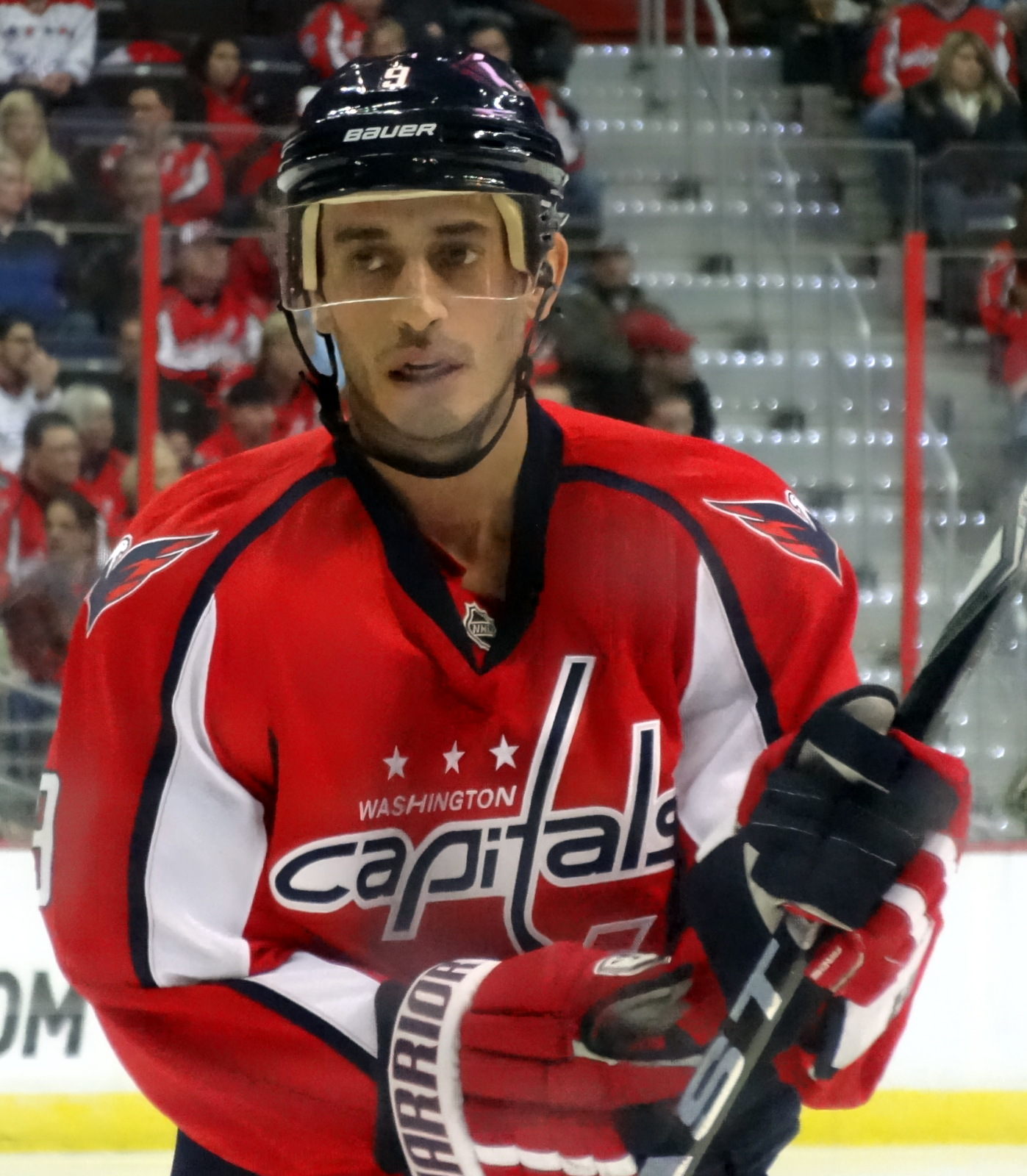
Ribeiro with the Capitals in 2013

On June 22, 2012, during the 2012 NHL entry draft and in the final year of his contract, Ribeiro was traded to the Washington Capitals in exchange for Cody Eakin and a 2012 second-round draft pick (54th overall). Alongside the likes of Alexander Ovechkin and Nicklas Bäckström on the Washington roster, Ribeiro scored prolifically with the Capitals, averaging over a point-per-game with 49 in 48 games.

=== Phoenix Coyotes ===
On July 2, 2013, seeking a long-term deal, the Capitals opted to allow Ribeiro to become an unrestricted free agent. On July 5, the Phoenix Coyotes then signed the free agent Ribeiro to a four-year, $22 million contract with a limited no-movement clause, re-uniting him with his former head coach whilst with the Stars, Dave Tippett. In his first season with the Coyotes in 2013–14, however, Ribeiro failed to reproduce his scoring pace of the previous year, scoring 16 goals and 47 points in 80 games.

=== Nashville Predators ===
On June 27, 2014, Ribeiro was bought-out by the Coyotes after only the first year of his four-year contract due to behavioural issues related to alcohol use. Weeks later, on July 15, Ribeiro signed a one-year, $1.05 million contract as an unrestricted free agent with the Nashville Predators.

On July 1, 2015, after a 2014–15 season in which he scored 15 goals and 47 assists for 62 points to finish second on the Predators in scoring, Ribeiro signed a two-year, $7 million contract extension with Nashville, thereby avoiding free agency.

In the second year of his contract extension, Ribeiro struggled to keep up his play, scoring just 4 goals in 46 games before being placed on waivers by the Predators on February 2. After going unclaimed, Ribeiro was assigned to the Milwaukee Admirals, the Predators' AHL affiliate. Ribeiro briefly considered retirement, but ultimately decided to report to the Admirals.

Ribeiro had battled alcoholism throughout his career in the NHL, and amidst reports that he had relapsed, his agent subsequently stated "There is not a single NHL or even European team that has called me to inquire about his services."

== Personal life ==
Ribeiro has three children (Mikael, Noah and Viktoria) with his ex-wife Tamara. Their divorce was finalized in September 2021 in Williamson County Tennessee. He is of Portuguese descent.

In 2014, Ribeiro faced charges from his former nanny that he forcibly sexually assaulted her at their Virginia residence. In 2017, Ribeiro settled the case out of court.

In 2024, Ribeiro went on trial for two counts of sexual assault and a count of attempted sexual assault, stemming from incidents at Lake Cypress Springs, Texas in 2021. He was found not guilty on two counts and the third deadlocked the jury resulting in a mistrial.

== Career statistics ==
=== Regular season and playoffs ===
			Regular season					Playoffs
Season	Team	League	GP	G	A	Pts	PIM	GP	G	A	Pts	PIM
1995–96	Montréal-Bourassa Collège Français	QMAAA	43	13	26	39	18	—	—	—	—	—
1996–97	Montréal-Bourassa Collège Français	QMAAA	43	32	57	89	48	16	15	23	38	14
1997–98	Rouyn-Noranda Huskies	QMJHL	67	40	85	125	55	6	3	1	4	0
1998–99	Rouyn-Noranda Huskies	QMJHL	69	67	100	167	137	11	5	11	16	12
1998–99	Fredericton Canadiens	AHL	—	—	—	—	—	5	0	1	1	2
1999–2000	Rouyn-Noranda Huskies	QMJHL	2	1	3	4	0	—	—	—	—	—
1999–2000	Quebec Remparts	QMJHL	21	17	28	45	30	11	3	20	23	38
1999–2000	Quebec Citadelles	AHL	3	0	0	0	2	—	—	—	—	—
1999–2000	Montreal Canadiens	NHL	19	1	1	2	2	—	—	—	—	—
2000–01	Quebec Citadelles	AHL	74	26	40	66	44	9	1	5	6	23
2000–01	Montreal Canadiens	NHL	2	0	0	0	2	—	—	—	—	—
2001–02	Quebec Citadelles	AHL	23	9	14	23	36	3	0	3	3	0
2001–02	Montreal Canadiens	NHL	43	8	10	18	12	—	—	—	—	—
2002–03	Hamilton Bulldogs	AHL	3	0	1	1	0	—	—	—	—	—
2002–03	Montreal Canadiens	NHL	52	5	12	17	6	—	—	—	—	—
2003–04	Montreal Canadiens	NHL	81	20	45	65	34	11	2	1	3	18
2004–05	Espoo Blues	SM-l	17	8	9	17	4	—	—	—	—	—
2005–06	Montreal Canadiens	NHL	79	16	35	51	36	6	0	2	2	0
2006–07	Dallas Stars	NHL	81	18	41	59	22	7	0	3	3	4
2007–08	Dallas Stars	NHL	76	27	56	83	46	18	3	14	17	16
2008–09	Dallas Stars	NHL	82	22	56	78	52	—	—	—	—	—
2009–10	Dallas Stars	NHL	66	19	34	53	38	—	—	—	—	—
2010–11	Dallas Stars	NHL	82	19	52	71	28	—	—	—	—	—
2011–12	Dallas Stars	NHL	74	18	45	63	66	—	—	—	—	—
2012–13	Washington Capitals	NHL	48	13	36	49	53	7	1	1	2	10
2013–14	Phoenix Coyotes	NHL	80	16	31	47	52	—	—	—	—	—
2014–15	Nashville Predators	NHL	82	15	47	62	52	6	1	4	5	4
2015–16	Nashville Predators	NHL	81	7	43	50	62	12	0	2	2	16
2016–17	Nashville Predators	NHL	46	4	21	25	14	—	—	—	—	—
2016–17	Milwaukee Admirals	AHL	28	5	21	26	18	3	0	3	3	0
NHL totals			1,074	228	565	793	577	67	7	27	34	68

=== International ===
Medal record

Representing Canada

World Junior Championships
Bronze medal – third place	2000 Umea	

Year	Team	Event	Result	GP	G	A	Pts	PIM
2000	Canada	WJC	3rd place, bronze medalist(s)	7	0	2	2	0
Junior totals				7	0	2	2	0

== Awards and honours ==
Award	Year
QMJHL
All-Rookie Team	1997–98
Second All-Star Team	1997–98
Michel Bergeron Trophy	1997–98
Paul Dumont Trophy	1997–98
Rookie of the Year	1997–98
CHL All-Rookie Team	1997–98
CHL Top Prospects Game	1997–98
First All-Star Team	1998–99
Jean Béliveau Trophy	1998–99
CHL First All-Star Team	1998–99
CHL Leading Scorer	1998–99
NHL
YoungStars Game	2001–02
All-Star Game	2008
