= Philips Plaque =

- Description: Best faceoff percentage in the QMJHL
- Country: Canada
- Presented by: QMJHL
- Website: chl.ca/lhjmq/en/

The Philips Plaque was awarded annually to the player with the best faceoff percentage in the Quebec Major Junior Hockey League. The award was initiated in 1997–98, and discontinued in 2001–02.

== Winners ==
Season	Player	Team
1997–98	Eric Demers	Victoriaville Tigres
1998–99	Eric Demers	Moncton Wildcats
1999–2000	Eric Pinoul	Sherbrooke Castors
2000–01	Pierre-Luc Emond	Drummondville Voltigeurs
2001–02	Pierre-Luc Emond	Cape Breton Screaming Eagles
