= Mathieu Chouinard =

Canadian ice hockey player (born 1980)

- Born: April 11, 1980 (age 46) Laval, Quebec, Canada
- Height: 6 ft 0 in (183 cm)
- Weight: 212 lb (96 kg; 15 st 2 lb)
- Position: Goaltender
- Caught: Left
- Played for: Los Angeles Kings
- NHL draft: 15th overall, 1998; Ottawa Senators; 45th overall, 2000; Ottawa Senators
- Playing career: 2000–2006

Mathieu Chouinard (born April 11, 1980) is a Canadian former professional ice hockey goaltender who played one game in the National Hockey League, with the Los Angeles Kings during the 2003–04 season. The rest of his career, which lasted from 2000 to 2006, was spent in the minor leagues. He was selected by the Ottawa Senators 15th overall in the 1998 NHL entry draft, and after failing to agree to a contract re-entered the draft, and in 2000 was again selected by the Senators, 45th overall.

== Career ==
As a youth, Chouinard played in the 1994 Quebec International Pee-Wee Hockey Tournament with a minor ice hockey team from the Mille-Îles area of Laval, Quebec.

Chouinard compiled a 104-60-13 record with the Shawinigan Cataractes and was selected by the Ottawa Senators in the first round (15th overall) of the 1998 NHL entry draft. By 2000, unable to agree to terms on a contract with the Senators, he instead opted back into the NHL draft. Hoping for a fresh start with a new organization, Chouinard was instead selected once more by the Senators, this time in Round 2 (45th overall) of the 2000 NHL entry draft.

Chouinard spent three seasons in the Senators' organization, winning the Harry "Hap" Holmes Memorial Award (shared with Martin Prusek and Simon Lajeunesse) during the 2001–02 American Hockey League season. He signed as a free agent with the Los Angeles Kings in July, 2003

Chouinard made his one NHL appearance on February 29, 2004, when the Los Angeles Kings faced the Mighty Ducks of Anaheim at the Arrowhead Pond. Midway through the third, forward Steve Rucchin scored to give the Ducks a 6–3 lead. Starter Cristobal Huet, was pulled and Chouinard completed the game, stopping two shots he faced.

== Career statistics ==
=== Regular season and playoffs ===
			Regular season									Playoffs
Season	Team	League	GP	W	L	T	MIN	GA	SO	GAA	SV%	GP	W	L	MIN	GA	SO	GAA	SV%
1995–96	Amos Forestiers	QMAAA	31	14	14	1	1613	114	1	4.24	—	3	1	2	190	11	0	3.48	—
1996–97	Shawinigan Cataractes	QMJHL	17	4	7	1	795	51	0	3.85	.861	4	1	3	264	15	0	3.41	.875
1997–98	Shawinigan Cataractes	QMJHL	55	32	18	3	3055	142	2	2.79	.906	6	2	4	348	24	0	4.14	.896
1998–99	Shawinigan Cataractes	QMJHL	56	36	16	4	3288	150	5	2.74	.915	6	2	4	392	27	0	4.13	.852
1999–00	Shawinigan Cataractes	QMJHL	59	32	20	5	3339	186	4	3.34	.897	13	7	6	769	41	0	3.20	.890
2000–01	Grand Rapids Griffins	IHL	28	17	7	1	1567	69	1	2.64	.902	3	1	1	135	4	0	1.78	.935
2001–02	Grand Rapids Griffins	AHL	25	11	12	1	1404	58	2	2.48	.894	—	—	—	—	—	—	—	—
2002–03	Binghamton Senators	AHL	4	2	0	0	152	5	0	1.98	.932	1	0	0	2	0	0	0.00	1.000
2002–03	Peoria Rivermen	ECHL	15	12	2	0	820	29	3	2.12	.924	—	—	—	—	—	—	—	—
2003–04	Los Angeles Kings	NHL	1	0	0	0	3	0	0	0.00	1.00	—	—	—	—	—	—	—	—
2003–04	Manchester Monarchs	AHL	22	10	6	0	1093	41	4	2.25	.913	—	—	—	—	—	—	—	—
2003–04	Reading Royals	ECHL	3	1	1	1	185	7	0	2.27	.922	—	—	—	—	—	—	—	—
2004–05	Cincinnati Mighty Ducks	AHL	3	1	1	0	153	4	1	1.57	.947	—	—	—	—	—	—	—	—
2004–05	San Diego Gulls	ECHL	27	11	9	3	1453	73	1	3.01	.906	—	—	—	—	—	—	—	—
2004–05	Peoria Rivermen	ECHL	1	0	1	0	58	2	0	2.07	.900	—	—	—	—	—	—	—	—
2005–06	Phoenix Roadrunners	ECHL	13	4	6	0	647	37	0	3.43	.906	—	—	—	—	—	—	—	—
AHL totals			54	24	19	1	2802	108	7	2.31	.915	1	0	0	2	0	0	0.00	1.000
ECHL totals			59	28	19	4	3163	148	4	2.81	.911	—	—	—	—	—	—	—	—
NHL totals			1	0	0	0	3	0	0	0.00	1.000	—	—	—	—	—	—	—	—

== Awards ==
- Named to the Quebec Major Junior Hockey League All-Star First Team, 1998–99.
- Winner of the Michel Briere Trophy, 1998–99.

== Transactions ==
- Selected by Ottawa Senators in first round (first Senators pick, 15th overall) of NHL entry draft, June 27, 1998.
- Returned to draft, and selected by Senators in the second round (second Senators pick, 45th overall) of NHL entry draft, June 24, 2000.
- Signed as free agent by Los Angeles Kings, July 7, 2003.
- Signed as free agent by San Diego Gulls (ECHL), September 28, 2004.
- Signed as free agent by Peoria Rivermen (ECHL), March 27, 2005.

== See also ==
- List of players who played only one game in the NHL

Preceded by Marián Hossa	Ottawa Senators first-round draft pick 1998	Succeeded by Martin Havlát
