= 1997–98 QMJHL season =

1997-98 QMJHL season
- League: Quebec Major Junior Hockey League
- Sport: Hockey
- Duration: Regular season Sept. 18, 1997 – Mar. 15, 1998; Playoffs; March 20 – May 1, 1997
- Teams: 15

Draft
- Top draft pick: Yanick Lehoux
- Picked by: Baie-Comeau Drakkar

Regular season
- Jean Rougeau Trophy: Quebec Remparts (5)
- Season MVP: Ramzi Abid (Chicoutimi Saguenéens)
- Top scorer: Ramzi Abid (Chicoutimi Saguenéens)

Playoffs
- Playoffs MVP: Jean-Pierre Dumont (Foreurs)
- Finals champions: Val-d'Or Foreurs (1)
- Runners-up: Rimouski Océanic

QMJHL seasons
- 1996–97 1998–99

1997-98 CHL season
- League: Canadian Hockey League
- Sport: Hockey
- Duration: OHL; Sept. 1997 – Mar. 1998; QMJHL; Sept. 18, 1997 – Mar. 15, 1998; WHL; Sept. 1996 – Mar. 1997
- Teams: 60
- Season MVP: Serhiy Varlamov (Swift Current Broncos) (WHL)
- Top scorer: Ramzi Abid (Chicoutimi Saguenéens) (QMJHL)

Memorial Cup
- Finals champions: Portland Winter Hawks (WHL) (2nd title)
- Runners-up: Guelph Storm (OHL)

The 1997–98 QMJHL season was the 29th season in the history of the Quebec Major Junior Hockey League. The Quebec Remparts name was revived after twelve years when the Beauport Harfangs changed identities. The QMJHL continued to grow in eastern markets, with an expansion team in Baie-Comeau and the relocating of the Granby Prédateurs to Cape Breton.

The league inaugurated the Philips Plaque, awarded to the player with the best faceoff percentage. The Ford Cups were renamed the Telus Cups, one each for the offensive and defensive players of the year.

Fifteen teams played 70 games each in the schedule. The Quebec Remparts finished first overall in the regular season winning their first Jean Rougeau Trophy, since the original name was revived. The Val-d'Or Foreurs won their first President's Cup, defeating the Rimouski Océanic in the finals.

== Team changes ==
- The Baie-Comeau Drakkar joined the league as an expansion franchise.
- The Beauport Harfangs relocated from the nearby suburbs, to Quebec City, becoming the second incarnation of the Quebec Remparts.
- The Granby Prédateurs relocated to Sydney, Nova Scotia, becoming the Cape Breton Screaming Eagles, and switched to the Dilio Division.
- The Shawinigan Cataractes switched to the Lebel Division.
- The Victoriaville Tigres switched to the Lebel Division.

== Final standings ==
Note: GP = Games played; W = Wins; L = Losses; T = Ties; Pts = Points; GF = Goals for; GA = Goals against

Dilio Division	GP	W	L	T	Pts	GF	GA
Quebec Remparts	70	46	18	6	98	285	204
Rimouski Océanic	70	40	27	3	83	296	257
Chicoutimi Saguenéens	70	36	33	1	73	272	285
Moncton Wildcats	70	29	32	9	67	240	229
Halifax Mooseheads	70	24	41	5	53	263	316
Cape Breton Screaming Eagles	70	19	46	5	43	211	295
Baie-Comeau Drakkar	70	18	47	5	41	215	332

Lebel Division	GP	W	L	T	Pts	GF	GA
Rouyn-Noranda Huskies	70	43	23	4	90	338	245
Victoriaville Tigres	70	40	23	7	87	274	209
Shawinigan Cataractes	70	40	24	6	86	262	217
Val-d'Or Foreurs	70	37	26	7	81	263	228
Laval Titan Collège Français	70	37	28	5	79	276	220
Hull Olympiques	70	32	37	1	65	270	268
Sherbrooke Faucons	70	26	41	3	55	220	273
Drummondville Voltigeurs	70	23	44	3	49	221	328

- complete list of standings.

== Scoring leaders ==
Note: GP = Games played; G = Goals; A = Assists; Pts = Points; PIM = Penalty minutes

Player	Team	GP	G	A	Pts	PIM
Ramzi Abid	Chicoutimi Saguenéens	68	50	85	135	266
Pierre Dagenais	Rouyn-Noranda Huskies	60	66	67	133	50
Mike Ribeiro	Rouyn-Noranda Huskies	67	40	85	125	55
Mathieu Benoit	Chicoutimi Saguenéens	59	56	61	117	32
Vincent Lecavalier	Rimouski Océanic	58	44	71	115	117
Brad Richards	Rimouski Océanic	68	33	82	115	44
Sebastien Roger	Moncton Wildcats	70	53	61	114	64
David Gosselin	Chicoutimi Saguenéens	69	46	64	110	139
Derrick Walser	Rimouski Océanic	70	41	69	110	135
David Thibeault	Victoriaville Tigres	70	46	56	102	95

- complete scoring statistics

== Playoffs ==
Jean-Pierre Dumont was the leading scorer of the playoffs with 46 points (31 goals, 15 assists).

Division quarterfinals

- Quebec Remparts defeated Cape Breton Screaming Eagles 4 games to 0.
- Rimouski Océanic defeated Halifax Mooseheads 4 games to 1.
- Moncton Wildcats defeated Chicoutimi Saguenéens 4 games to 2.
- Hull Olympiques defeated Rouyn-Noranda Huskies 4 games to 2.
- Laval Titan Collège Français defeated Victoriaville Tigres 4 games to 2.
- Val-d'Or Foreurs defeated Shawinigan Cataractes 4 games to 2.

Division semifinals - Round-robin

Note: GP = Games played; W = Wins; L = Losses; T = Ties; PTS = Points; GF = Goals for; GA = Goals against

Dilio Division	GP	W	L	T	Pts	GF	GA
Rimouski Océanic	4	3	1	0	6	24	14
Quebec Remparts	4	2	2	0	4	16	20
Moncton Wildcats	4	1	3	0	2	11	17
Lebel Division	GP	W	L	T	Pts	GF	GA
Val-d'Or Foreurs	4	2	2	0	4	19	17
Laval Titan Collège Français ^{‡}	5	3	2	0	6	16	15
Hull Olympiques ^{‡}	5	2	3	0	4	18	21

^{‡} Laval Titan Collège Français defeated Hull Olympiques in a one-game playoff to determine 2nd place in the round-robin standings.

Division finals

- Rimouski Océanic defeated Quebec Remparts 4 games to 2.
- Val-d'Or Foreurs defeated Laval Titan Collège Français 4 games to 1.

Presidents Cup Finals

- Val-d'Or Foreurs defeated Rimouski Océanic 4 games to 0.

== Division Quarterfinals ==
=== (L1) Rouyn-Noranda Huskies vs. (L6) Hull Olympiques ===
March 20	Rouyn-Noranda Huskies	3 – 2	OT	Hull Olympiques	Aréna Dave Keon

March 22	Rouyn-Noranda Huskies	6 – 5	Hull Olympiques	Aréna Dave Keon

March 24	Hull Olympiques	6 – 5	Rouyn-Noranda Huskies	Centre Robert Guertin

March 25	Hull Olympiques	6 – 4	Rouyn-Noranda Huskies	Centre Robert Guertin

March 27	Rouyn-Noranda Huskies	3 – 4	Hull Olympiques	Aréna Dave Keon

March 29	Hull Olympiques	4 – 2	Rouyn-Noranda Huskies	Centre Robert Guertin

Hull wins series 4 – 2

=== (L2) Victoriaville Tigres vs. (L5) Laval Titan Collège Français ===
March 20	Victoriaville Tigres	3 – 4	OT	Laval Titan Collège Français	Colisée des Bois-Francs

March 22	Laval Titan Collège Français	4 – 2	Victoriaville Tigres	Centre Sportif

March 24	Victoriaville Tigres	6 – 3	Laval Titan Collège Français	Colisée des Bois-Francs

March 25	Laval Titan Collège Français	9 – 0	Victoriaville Tigres	Centre Sportif

March 27	Victoriaville Tigres	6 – 2	Laval Titan Collège Français	Colisée des Bois-Francs

March 29	Laval Titan Collège Français	5 – 3	Victoriaville Tigres	Centre Sportif

Laval wins series 4 – 2

=== (L3) Shawinigan Cataractes vs. (L4) Val-d'Or Foreurs ===
March 20	Shawinigan Cataractes	5 – 3	Val-d'Or Foreurs	Aréna Jacques Plante
7:31 - François Méthot (1)		First period	Christian Daigle (1) - pp - 11:08; Jean-Pierre Dumont (1) - 15:28
0:29 - pp - Michel Tremblay (1)		Second period	No scoring
1:37 - Alexandre Tremblay (1); 2:34 - Pascal Dupuis (1); 19:09 - en - Jean-Philippe Paré (1)		Third period	Jean-Pierre Dumont (2) - pp - 18:47
Mathieu Chouinard (41 saves / 44 shots)		Goalie stats	Roberto Luongo (29 saves / 33 shots)

March 22	Shawinigan Cataractes	3 – 1	Val-d'Or Foreurs	Aréna Jacques Plante
8:38 - Sylvain Rodier (1)		First period	No scoring
12:45 - Pascal Dupuis (2)		Second period	No scoring
0:27 - Pavel Smirnov (1)		Third period	Dominic Chiasson (1) - pp - 4:05
Mathieu Chouinard (41 saves / 42 shots)		Goalie stats	Roberto Luongo (41 saves / 44 shots)

March 24	Val-d'Or Foreurs	4 – 1	Shawinigan Cataractes	Palais des Sports
No scoring		First period	No scoring
17:02 - Jean-Pierre Dumont (3)		Second period	No scoring
0:37 - Didier Tremblay (1); 12:23 - Benoît Dusablon (1); 18:37 - Francis Lessard (1)		Third period	Jean-Philippe Paré (2) - pp - 4:32
Roberto Luongo (38 saves / 39 shots)		Goalie stats	Mathieu Chouinard (35 saves / 39 shots)

March 25	Val-d'Or Foreurs	6 – 1	Shawinigan Cataractes	Palais des Sports
12:44 - pp - Jean-Pierre Dumont (4); 17:48 - pp - Jean-Pierre Dumont (5)		First period	Jean-Philippe Paré (3) - pp - 10:03
16:49 - pp - Mathieu Létourneau (1); 18:12 - Christian Daigle (2)		Second period	No scoring
0:47 - pp - Christian Drolet (1); 8:59 - Dominic Chiasson (2)		Third period	No scoring
Roberto Luongo (40 saves / 41 shots)		Goalie stats	Mathieu Chouinard (34 saves / 40 shots)

March 27	Shawinigan Cataractes	0 – 6	Val-d'Or Foreurs	Aréna Jacques Plante
No scoring		First period	Dominic Chiasson (3) - 0:29
No scoring		Second period	Jean-Pierre Dumont (6) - pp - 1:11; Christian Drolet (2) - sh - 16:24
No scoring		Third period	Jean-Pierre Dumont (7) - 1:50; Dominic Chiasson (4) - 5:50; Jean-Pierre Dumont (8) - 6:45
Mathieu Chouinard (36 saves / 41 shots); Charles Beauparlant (0 saves / 1 shot)		Goalie stats	Roberto Luongo (33 saves / 33 shots)

March 29	Val-d'Or Foreurs	7 – 1	Shawinigan Cataractes	Palais des Sports
12:50 - Didier Tremblay (2); 15:56 - pp - Dominic Chiasson (5); 16:57 - pp - Christian Drolet (3)		First period	No scoring
8:54 - pp - Christian Daigle (3)		Second period	No scoring
3:26 - Jean-Pierre Dumont (9); 9:42 - pp - Jean-Pierre Dumont (10); 17:00 - Christian Drolet (4)		Third period	18:44 - Benoît Côté (1)
Roberto Luongo (33 saves / 34 shots)		Goalie stats	Mathieu Chouinard (20 saves / 25 shots); Charles Beauparlant (2 saves / 4 shot)

Val-d'Or wins series 4 – 2

=== (D1) Quebec Remparts vs. (D6) Cape Breton Screaming Eagles ===
March 20	Quebec Remparts	5 – 1	Cape Breton Screaming Eagles	PEPS

March 22	Quebec Remparts	8 – 2	Cape Breton Screaming Eagles	PEPS

March 24	Cape Breton Screaming Eagles	1 – 2	Quebec Remparts	Centre 200

March 25	Cape Breton Screaming Eagles	2 – 5	Quebec Remparts	Centre 200

Quebec wins series 4 – 0

=== (D2) Rimouski Océanic vs. (D5) Halifax Mooseheads ===
March 20	Rimouski Océanic	6 – 0	Halifax Mooseheads	Colisée de Rimouski
6:03 - pp - Francis Bélanger (1); 17:01 - Vincent Lecavalier (1); 19:07 - pp - François Drainville (1)		First period	No scoring
13:04 - pp - Francis Bélanger (2)		Second period	No scoring
2:03 - Brad Richards (1); 11:11 - Francis Bélanger (3)		Third period	No scoring
Jean-Marc Pelletier (30 saves / 31 shots)		Goalie stats	Joey MacDonald (11 saves / 14 shots); Martin Bilodeau (22 saves / 25 shots)

March 22	Rimouski Océanic	6 – 2	Halifax Mooseheads	Colisée de Rimouski
11:32 - pp - Yannick Tremblay (1); 16:15 - pp - Yannick Tremblay (2)		First period	Alex Tanguay (1) - pp - 8:11; Alex Tanguay (2) - pp - 13:08
4:57 - pp - Jonathan Beaulieu (1); 6:04 - Vincent Lecavalier (2); 11:26 - Alexandre Jacques (1); 16:01 - Vincent Lecavalier (3)		Second period	No scoring
No scoring		Third period	No scoring
Jean-Marc Pelletier (25 saves / 27 shots)		Goalie stats	Martin Bilodeau (38 saves / 44 shots)

March 24	Halifax Mooseheads	3 – 12	Rimouski Océanic	Halifax Metro Centre
15:47 - Jason Troini (1)		First period	Alexandre Jacques (2) - pp - 4:23
No scoring		Second period	Alexandre Jacques (3) - pp - 5:39; Dave Malenfant (1) - 6:23; Derrick Walser (1) - pp - 11:30; François Drainville (2) - 12:41
3:00 - Alexandre Couture (1); 5:32 - pp - Alex Tanguay (3)		Third period	François Drainville (3) - 1:25; Éric Drouin (1) - 2:28; Yannick Tremblay (3) - 7:43; Yannick Tremblay (4) - 9:18; Jimmy Grondin (1) - 10:20; Jonathan St-Louis (1) - 16:20; David Bilodeau (1) - 17:28
Martin Bilodeau (33 saves / 45 shots)		Goalie stats	Jean-Marc Pelletier (19 saves / 22 shots)

March 25	Halifax Mooseheads	8 – 7	Rimouski Océanic	Halifax Metro Centre
12:19 - Alex Tanguay (4)		First period	Vincent Lecavalier (4) - pp - 4:36
7:21 - Brandon Reid (1); 9:28 - Alexandre Couture (2); 10:35 - Alex Tanguay (5); 18:10 - pp - Jason Troini (2)		Second period	Vincent Lecavalier (5) - 5:35; Dave Malenfant (2) - 6:56; Vincent Lecavalier (6) - 14:58; Francis Bélanger (4) - 17:15
8:47 - Ryan Power (1); 9:48 - Mauro Di Paolo (1); 19:14 - Alex Tanguay (6)		Third period	Derrick Walser (2) - 13:59; Alexandre Jacques (4) - 18:54
Joey MacDonald (40 saves / 47 shots)		Goalie stats	Philippe Sauvé (22 saves / 30 shots)

March 27	Rimouski Océanic	5 – 4	Halifax Mooseheads	Colisée de Rimouski
5:07 - Alexandre Jacques (5)		First period	Jason Troini (3) - pp - 12:19
15:13 - Jonathan Beaulieu (2); 18:31 - Brad Richards (2)		Second period	Alexandre Mathieu (1) - 10:27
8:37 - David St-Onge (1); 19:59 - Alexandre Jacques (6)		Third period	Alex Tanguay (7) - 0:21; Alexandre Couture (3) - pp - 18:51
Jean-Marc Pelletier (21 saves / 25 shots)		Goalie stats	Joey MacDonald (42 saves / 47 shots)

Rimouski wins series 4 – 1

=== (L3) Chicoutimi Saguenéens vs. (L4) Moncton Wildcats ===
March 20	Chicoutimi Saguenéens	1 – 4	Moncton Wildcats	Centre Georges-Vézina

March 21	Chicoutimi Saguenéens	1 – 5	Moncton Wildcats	Centre Georges-Vézina

March 23	Moncton Wildcats	2 – 3	Chicoutimi Saguenéens	Moncton Coliseum

March 24	Moncton Wildcats	7 – 2	Chicoutimi Saguenéens	Moncton Coliseum

March 27	Chicoutimi Saguenéens	4 – 2	Moncton Wildcats	Centre Georges-Vézina

March 30	Moncton Wildcats	6 – 2	Chicoutimi Saguenéens	Moncton Coliseum

Moncton wins series 4 – 2

== Division Semifinals ==
=== April 1 ===
==== Lebel Division ====
Val-d'Or Foreurs	7 – 4	Hull Olympiques	Palais des Sports
10:02 - Jean-Pierre Dumont (11); 15:17 - Jean-Pierre Dumont (12); 16:54 - pp - Didier Tremblay (3)	First period	No scoring
15:13 - Karol Bartanus (1)	Second period	Ryan Lauzon (5) - 3:50; Ryan Lauzon (6) - pp - 10:36
5:59 - Jean-Pierre Dumont (13); 10:28 - pp - Karol Bartanus (2); 19:59 - en - Karol Bartanus (3)	Third period	Marty Johnston (6) - pp - 17:41; Francis Nault (2) - 19:11
Roberto Luongo (29 saves / 33 shots)	Goalie stats	Philippe Bergeron (6 saves / 9 shots); Frédéric Malette (26 saves / 29 shots)

==== Dilio Division ====
Quebec Remparts	3 – 4	Moncton Wildcats	PEPS

=== April 2 ===
Hull Olympiques	3 – 2	OT	Laval Titan Collège Français	Centre Robert Guertin

=== April 3 ===
==== Lebel Division ====
Moncton Wildcats	2 – 4	Rimouski Océanic	Moncton Coliseum
Yannick Thériault (3) - 19:24	First period	No scoring
Alexei Tezikov (3) - pp - 9:46	Second period	0:47 - Alexandre Jacques (7); 7:06 - Alexandre Jacques (8)
No scoring	Third period	10:19 - Derrick Walser (3); 19:29 - en - Derrick Walser (4)
Jean-François Damphousse (31 saves / 34 shots)	Goalie stats	Jean-Marc Pelletier (25 saves / 27 shots)

==== Dilio Division ====
Laval Titan Collège Français	3 – 6	Val-d'Or Foreurs	Centre Sportif
Martin Fillion (4) - 5:59; Gregor Baumgartner (3) - sh - 6:58	First period	0:49 - Jean-Pierre Dumont (14); 2:19 - Dominic Chiasson (6); 3:58 - Christian Daigle (4); 8:01 - pp - Christian Daigle (5)
Dominic Perna (8) - 10:20	Second period	7:03 - Lee Cousineau (1)
No scoring	Third period	10:08 - Christian Daigle (6)
Maxime Gingras (0 saves / 2 shots); Jonathan Charron (23 saves / 27 shots)	Goalie stats	Roberto Luongo (34 saves / 37 shots)

=== April 4 ===
Moncton Wildcats	2 – 4	Quebec Remparts	Moncton Coliseum

=== April 5 ===
Laval Titan Collège Français	4 – 3	Hull Olympiques	Centre Sportif

=== April 6 ===
==== Lebel Division ====
Hull Olympiques	6 – 5	Val-d'Or Foreurs	Centre Robert Guertin
Marty Johnston (9) - 1:19; Marty Johnston (10) - 15:01	First period	7:35 - Dominic Chiasson (7); 10:40 - Jean-Pierre Dumont (15); 15:43 - pp - Jean-Pierre Dumont (16); 16:16 - Karol Bartanus (4)
Ryan Lauzon (7) - 6:07; Marty Johnston (11) - pp - 8:53; Marty Johnston (12) - pp - 15:11	Second period	14:48 - Christian Daigle (7)
Yan Bouchard (2) - 10:46	Third period	No scoring
Philippe Bergeron (24 saves / 29 shots)	Goalie stats	David St-Germain (23 saves / 29 shots)

==== Dilio Division ====
Rimouski Océanic	8 – 2	Quebec Remparts	Colisée de Rimouski
Derrick Walser (5) - 8:51; Alexandre Jacques (9) - 10:02; Alexandre Jacques (10) - pp - 12:07; Vincent Lecavalier (7) - 16:53	First period	13:24 - Kurt Johnston (4)
François Drainville (4) - pp - 2:54; Derrick Walser (6) - pp - 9:42; Alexandre Jacques (11) - 14:37	Second period	10:11 - Martin Moïse (2)
Éric Drouin (2) - 18:19	Third period	No scoring
Jean-Marc Pelletier (36 saves / 38 shots); Philippe Sauvé (8 saves / 8 shots)	Goalie stats	Patrick Couture (16 saves / 22 shots); Maxime Ouellet (9 saves / 11 shots)

=== April 7 ===
==== Lebel Division ====
Val-d'Or Foreurs	1 – 4	Laval Titan Collège Français	Palais des Sports
No scoring	First period	No scoring
15:47 - Christian Daigle (8)	Second period	Gregor Baumgartner (4) - pp - 9:48
No scoring	Third period	Frédéric Tremblay (1) - 6:19; Frédéric Tremblay (2) - 17:55; James Desmarais (6) - en - 19:49
David St-Germain (35 saves / 38 shots)	Goalie stats	Maxime Gingras (29 saves / 30 shots)

==== Dilio Division ====
Rimouski Océanic	6 – 3	Moncton Wildcats	Colisée de Rimouski
10:33 - pp - Francis Bélanger (5)	First period	Sébastien Roger (7) - 15:45
2:49 - Vincent Lecavalier (8); 17:57 - Dave Malenfant (3)	Second period	David Comeau (5) - pp - 4:18
0:24 - pp - Francis Bélanger (6); 6:07 - Vincent Lecavalier (9); 17:51 - pp - Brad Richards (3)	Third period	Jarrod Thomas (4) - 11:26
Jean-Marc Pelletier (20 saves / 23 shots)	Goalie stats	Jean-François Damphousse (38 saves / 44 shots)

=== April 8 ===
Laval Titan Collège Français	3 – 2	Hull Olympiques	Centre Sportif

=== April 9 ===
Quebec Remparts	7 – 6	OT	Rimouski Océanic	PEPS
No scoring	First period		Derrick Walser (7) - pp - 13:53; Jimmy Grondin (2) - pp - 14:31
6:57 - pp - David Bernier (4); 8:12 - Mathieu Normandin (2); 13:54 - Jérôme Marois (1); 16:58 - Simon Gagné (5)	Second period		Derrick Walser (8) - 0:41; Jimmy Grondin (3) - 1:37; Alexandre Jacques (12) - 3:20
9:20 - pp - Dmytro Tolkunov (2); 18:37 - David Bernier (5)	Third period		Philippe Grondin (1) - 3:28
6:17 - Simon Gagné (6)	First overtime period		No scoring
Philippe Sauvé (50 saves / 57 shots)	Goalie stats		Patrick Couture (6 saves / 10 shots); Maxime Ouellet (18 saves / 20 shots)

== Division Finals ==
=== (L4) Val-d'Or Foreurs vs. (L5) Laval Titan Collège Français ===
April 10	Val-d'Or Foreurs	6 – 2	Laval Titan Collège Français	Palais des Sports
7:21 - pp - Jean-Pierre Dumont (17); 14:51 - pp - Jean-Pierre Dumont (18)		First period	Martin Fillion (8) - pp - 13:59
3:25 - pp - Christian Drolet (5); 13:58 - Jean-Pierre Dumont (19); 16:43 - Lee Cousineau (2)		Second period	No scoring
16:50 - Karol Bartanus (5)		Third period	Alain O'Driscoll (1) - 17:18
Roberto Luongo (27 saves / 29 shots)		Goalie stats	Maxime Gingras (20 saves / 26 shots)

April 12	Val-d'Or Foreurs	5 – 1	Laval Titan Collège Français	Palais des Sports
No scoring		First period	Dominic Perna (10) - 11:33
1:39 - pp - Didier Tremblay (4); 10:10 - Dominic Chiasson (8); 17:13 - Karol Bartanus (6)		Second period	No scoring
2:59 - Jean-Pierre Dumont (20); 8:18 - pp - Karol Bartanus (7)		Third period	No scoring
Roberto Luongo (24 saves / 25 shots)		Goalie stats	Maxime Gingras (32 saves / 37 shots)

April 14	Laval Titan Collège Français	6 – 4	Val-d'Or Foreurs	Centre Sportif
1:00 - pp - Ryan Flinn (1); 6:36 - Jonathan Girard (2)		First period	Jean-Pierre Dumont (21) - 1:24; Jean-Pierre Dumont (22) - pp - 8:41; Christian Daigle (9) - 12:02
3:53 - pp - François Beauchemin (1)		Second period	No scoring
5:59 - pp - Martin Fillion (9); 14:19 - sh - Gregor Baumgartner (5); 15:41 - Martin Lavergne (4)		Third period	Didier Tremblay (5) - pp - 1:06
Maxime Gingras (43 saves / 47 shots)		Goalie stats	Roberto Luongo (34 saves / 40 shots)

April 17	Laval Titan Collège Français	1 – 2	Val-d'Or Foreurs	Centre Sportif
No scoring		First period	No scoring
No scoring		Second period	Christian Drolet (6) - 7:49; Dominic Chiasson (9) - 14:53
6:50 - Jean-Philippe Soucy (2)		Third period	No scoring
Maxime Gingras (18 saves / 20 shots)		Goalie stats	Roberto Luongo (27 saves / 28 shots)

April 19	Val-d'Or Foreurs	4 – 0	Laval Titan Collège Français	Palais des Sports
7:11 - Christian Daigle (10); 18:51 - Christian Daigle (11)		First period	No scoring
12:24 - Jean-Pierre Dumont (23); 13:18 - pp - Dominic Chiasson (10)		Second period	No scoring
No scoring		Third period	No scoring
Roberto Luongo (23 saves / 23 shots)		Goalie stats	Maxime Gingras (33 saves / 37 shots)

Val-d'Or wins series 4 – 1

=== (D1) Quebec Remparts vs. (D2) Rimouski Océanic ===
April 12	Quebec Remparts	4 – 5	OT	Rimouski Océanic	PEPS

April 14	Rimouski Océanic	5 – 4	Quebec Remparts	Colisée de Rimouski

April 16	Quebec Remparts	3 – 5	Rimouski Océanic	PEPS

April 17	Rimouski Océanic	3 – 4	OT	Quebec Remparts	Colisée de Rimouski

April 19	Quebec Remparts	7 – 3	Rimouski Océanic	PEPS

April 20	Rimouski Océanic	5 – 2	Quebec Remparts	Colisée de Rimouski

Rimouski wins series 4 – 2

== President's Cup Finals ==
=== (D2) Rimouski Océanic vs. (L4) Val-d'Or Foreurs ===
April 27	Rimouski Océanic	3 – 8	Val-d'Or Foreurs	Colisée de Rimouski

April 28	Rimouski Océanic	2 – 5	Val-d'Or Foreurs	Colisée de Rimouski

April 30	Val-d'Or Foreurs	7 – 3	Rimouski Océanic	Palais des Sports

May 1	Val-d'Or Foreurs	9 – 2	Rimouski Océanic	Palais des Sports

Val-d'Or wins series 4 – 0

== All-star teams ==
First team

- Goaltender - Mathieu Garon, Victoriaville Tigres
- Left defence - Derrick Walser, Rimouski Océanic
- Right defence - Remi Royer, Rouyn-Noranda Huskies
- Left winger - Ramzi Abid, Chicoutimi Saguenéens
- Centreman - Vincent Lecavalier, Rimouski Océanic
- Right winger - Mathieu Benoit, Chicoutimi Saguenéens
- Coach - Guy Chouinard, Quebec Remparts

Second team

- Goaltender - Patrick Couture, Quebec Remparts
- Left defence - Alexei Tezikov, Moncton Wildcats
- Right defence - Jonathan Girard, Laval Titan Collège Français
- Left winger - Pierre Dagenais, Rouyn-Noranda Huskies
- Centreman - Mike Ribeiro, Rouyn-Noranda Huskies
- Right winger - Sebastien Roger, Moncton Wildcats
- Coach - Claude Julien, Hull Olympiques

Rookie team

- Goaltender - Jean-Marc Pelletier, Rimouski Océanic
- Left defence - Alexei Tezikov, Moncton Wildcats
- Right defence - Mathieu Biron, Shawinigan Cataractes
- Left winger - Brad Richards, Rimouski Océanic
- Centreman - Mike Ribeiro, Rouyn-Noranda Huskies
- Right winger - Michael Ryder, Hull Olympiques
- Coach - Christian Larue, Chicoutimi Saguenéens
- List of First/Second/Rookie team all-stars.

== Trophies and awards ==
Team

- President's Cup - Playoff Champions, Val-d'Or Foreurs
- Jean Rougeau Trophy - Regular Season Champions, Quebec Remparts
- Robert Lebel Trophy - Team with best GAA, Quebec Remparts

Player

- Michel Brière Memorial Trophy - Most Valuable Player, Ramzi Abid, Chicoutimi Saguenéens
- Jean Béliveau Trophy - Top Scorer, Ramzi Abid, Chicoutimi Saguenéens
- Guy Lafleur Trophy - Playoff MVP, Jean-Pierre Dumont, Val-d'Or Foreurs
- Telus Cup – Offensive - Offensive Player of the Year, Pierre Dagenais, Rouyn-Noranda Huskies
- Telus Cup – Defensive - Defensive Player of the Year, Mathieu Garon, Victoriaville Tigres
- AutoPro Plaque - Best plus/minus total, David Thibeault, Victoriaville Tigres
- Philips Plaque - Best faceoff percentage, Eric Demers, Victoriaville Tigres
- Jacques Plante Memorial Trophy - Best GAA, Mathieu Garon, Victoriaville Tigres
- Emile Bouchard Trophy - Defenceman of the Year, Derrick Walser, Rimouski Océanic
- Mike Bossy Trophy - Best Pro Prospect, Vincent Lecavalier, Rimouski Océanic
- RDS Cup - Rookie of the Year, Mike Ribeiro, Rouyn-Noranda Huskies
- Michel Bergeron Trophy - Offensive Rookie of the Year, Mike Ribeiro, Rouyn-Noranda Huskies
- Raymond Lagacé Trophy - Defensive Rookie of the Year, Alexei Tezikov, Moncton Wildcats
- Frank J. Selke Memorial Trophy - Most sportsmanlike player, Simon Laliberte, Moncton Wildcats
- QMJHL Humanitarian of the Year - Humanitarian of the Year, David Thibeault, Victoriaville Tigres
- Marcel Robert Trophy - Best Scholastic Player, Michel Tremblay, Shawinigan Cataractes
- Paul Dumont Trophy - Personality of the Year, Mike Ribeiro, Rouyn-Noranda Huskies

Executive

- Ron Lapointe Trophy - Coach of the Year, Guy Chouinard, Quebec Remparts
- John Horman Trophy - Executive of the Year, Lionel Brochu, Val-d'Or Foreurs
- St-Clair Group Plaque - Marketing Director of the Year, Jeff Rose, Moncton Wildcats

== See also ==
- 1998 Memorial Cup
- 1998 NHL entry draft
- 1997–98 OHL season
- 1997–98 WHL season

Preceded by 1996–97 QMJHL season	QMJHL seasons	Succeeded by 1998–99 QMJHL season
