= Jean-Marc Pelletier =

American ice hockey player (born 1978)

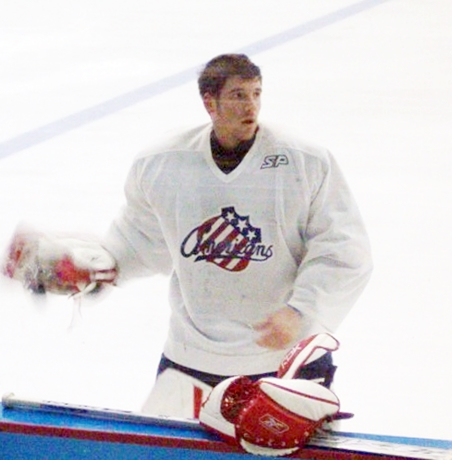
- Born: March 4, 1978 (age 48) Atlanta, Georgia, U.S.
- Height: 6 ft 3 in (191 cm)
- Weight: 210 lb (95 kg; 15 st 0 lb)
- Position: Goaltender
- Caught: Left
- Played for: Philadelphia Flyers; Phoenix Coyotes; Adler Mannheim; Hamburg Freezers
- NHL draft: 30th overall, 1997; Philadelphia Flyers
- Playing career: 1998–2010

Jean-Marc Pelletier (born March 4, 1978) is a Canadian-American former professional ice hockey goaltender who played seven National Hockey League (NHL) games over parts of three seasons for the Philadelphia Flyers and Phoenix Coyotes between 1999 and 2004. The rest of his career, which lasted from 1998 to 2010, was mainly spent in the semi pro leagues.

== Biography ==
Pelletier was born in Atlanta, Georgia, and grew up in Saint-Lambert, Quebec. As a youth, he played in the 1992 Quebec International Pee-Wee Hockey Tournament with the Richelieu Champlain minor ice hockey team.

Pelletier was drafted out of Cornell University by the Philadelphia Flyers in the second round of the 1997 NHL entry draft with the 30th overall pick. He played the 1997–98 season with the Rimouski Océanic of the Quebec Major Junior Hockey League, and also played for Team USA at the 1998 World Junior Ice Hockey Championships.

Pelletier joined the Flyers' AHL affiliate, the Philadelphia Phantoms in 1998–99. He also appeared in one NHL game that season for the Flyers, a 0-5 loss against the Ottawa Senators. He made brief stops in the NHL in two other seasons, appearing in two games for the Phoenix Coyotes in the 2002–03 season and four more in the 2003–04 season.

At the end of November 2006, Pelletier signed a contract with Adler Mannheim of the DEL to replace Robert Müller, who was diagnosed with a brain tumor. After the season, he signed a one-year-contract with the Hamburg Freezers.

== Career statistics ==
=== Regular season and playoffs ===
			Regular season										Playoffs
Season	Team	League	GP	W	L	T	OTL	MIN	GA	SO	GAA	SV%	GP	W	L	MIN	GA	SO	GAA	SV%
1993–94	Richelieu Riverains	QMAAA	24	14	8	2	—	1440	91	0	3.79	—	—	—	—	—	—	—	—	—
1994–95	Richelieu Riverains	QMAAA	21	15	6	0	—	1260	71	0	3.36	—	—	—	—	—	—	—	—	—
1995–96	Cornell University	ECAC	5	1	2	0	—	179	15	0	5.03	.857	—	—	—	—	—	—	—	—
1996–97	Cornell University	ECAC	11	5	2	3	—	678	28	1	2.48	.917	—	—	—	—	—	—	—	—
1997–98	Rimouski Océanic	QMJHL	34	17	11	3	—	1914	118	0	3.70	.888	16	11	3	895	51	1	3.42	.899
1998–99	Philadelphia Phantoms	AHL	47	25	16	4	—	2636	122	2	2.78	.909	1	0	0	27	0	0	0.00	1.000
1998–99	Philadelphia Flyers	NHL	1	0	1	0	—	60	5	0	5.00	.828	—	—	—	—	—	—	—	—
1999–00	Philadelphia Phantoms	AHL	24	14	10	0	—	1405	58	3	2.48	.914	—	—	—	—	—	—	—	—
1999–00	Cincinnati Cyclones	IHL	22	14	4	2	—	1278	52	2	2.44	.924	3	1	1	160	8	1	3.00	.899
2000–01	Cincinnati Cyclones	IHL	39	18	14	5	—	2261	119	2	3.16	.906	5	1	4	318	15	0	2.83	.915
2001–02	Lowell Lock Monsters	AHL	40	21	12	4	—	2284	98	2	2.57	.921	5	2	3	298	13	0	2.62	.908
2002–03	Lowell Lock Monsters	AHL	17	6	10	0	—	861	51	1	3.55	.898	—	—	—	—	—	—	—	—
2002–03	Springfield Falcons	AHL	24	12	7	4	—	1391	55	2	2.37	.926	6	3	3	368	16	1	2.61	.924
2002–03	Phoenix Coyotes	NHL	2	0	2	0	—	119	6	0	3.03	.875	—	—	—	—	—	—	—	—
2003–04	Springfield Falcons	AHL	43	10	24	5	—	2433	109	2	2.69	.922	—	—	—	—	—	—	—	—
2003–04	Phoenix Coyotes	NHL	4	1	1	0	—	175	12	0	4.12	.857	—	—	—	—	—	—	—	—
2004–05	Springfield Falcons	AHL	13	2	10	1	—	714	35	0	2.94	.904	—	—	—	—	—	—	—	—
2004–05	Utah Grizzlies	AHL	23	6	12	1	—	1231	77	0	3.75	.891	—	—	—	—	—	—	—	—
2005–06	Rochester Americans	AHL	39	21	15	—	1	2198	120	0	3.28	.893	—	—	—	—	—	—	—	—
2006–07	Rochester Americans	AHL	4	4	0	—	0	244	10	0	2.46	.917	—	—	—	—	—	—	—	—
2006–07	Adler Mannheim	DEL	21	19	2	—	0	1129	49	0	2.60	.915	11	10	1	673	24	1	2.14	.928
2007–08	Hamburg Freezers	DEL	41	17	23	—	0	2397	113	1	2.83	.902	1	0	1	63	4	0	3.83	.882
2008–09	Hamburg Freezers	DEL	52	27	25	—	0	3109	139	2	2.68	.923	9	3	6	563	28	0	2.99	.916
2009–10	Hamburg Freezers	DEL	29	11	16	—	0	1547	85	2	3.30	.909	—	—	—	—	—	—	—	—
NHL totals			7	1	4	0	—	354	23	0	3.90	.857	—	—	—	—	—	—	—	—

=== International ===
Year	Team	Event	GP	W	L	T	MIN	GA	SO	GAA	SV%
1998	United States	WJC	4	2	1	0	180	5	1	1.66	.902
Junior totals			4	2	1	0	180	5	1	1.66	.902

== Awards and honors ==
Award	Year
QMJHL
All-Rookie Team	1998
AHL
All-Star Game	1999, 2000, 2002
DEL
Champion (Adler Mannheim)	2007
All-Star Game	2009
