= Chris Langevin =

Canadian ice hockey player

- Born: November 27, 1959 (age 66) Montreal, Quebec, Canada
- Height: 6 ft 0 in (183 cm)
- Weight: 190 lb (86 kg; 13 st 8 lb)
- Position: Left wing
- Shot: Left
- Played for: Buffalo Sabres
- NHL draft: Undrafted
- Playing career: 1980–1986

Christopher Langevin (born November 27, 1959) is a Canadian former professional ice hockey forward. He played twenty-two games in the National Hockey League with the Buffalo Sabres between 1983 and 1985, scoring three goals and adding one assist. The rest of his career, which lasted from 1980 to 1986, was spent in the minor leagues.

== Career statistics ==
=== Regular season and playoffs ===
			Regular season					Playoffs
Season	Team	League	GP	G	A	Pts	PIM	GP	G	A	Pts	PIM
1977–78	Chicoutimi Sagueneens	QMJHL	67	8	20	28	176	—	—	—	—	—
1978–79	Chicoutimi Sagueneens	QMJHL	65	24	23	47	182	4	0	2	2	19
1979–80	Chicoutimi Sagueneens	QMJHL	46	22	30	52	97	2	0	3	3	14
1980–81	Saginaw Gears	IHL	75	35	48	83	179	13	2	5	7	24
1981–82	Rochester Americans	AHL	33	3	5	8	150	9	4	5	9	33
1982–83	Rochester Americans	AHL	71	18	25	43	255	11	0	3	3	34
1983–84	Rochester Americans	AHL	41	11	14	25	133	15	3	2	5	39
1983–84	Buffalo Sabres	NHL	6	1	0	1	2	—	—	—	—	—
1984–85	Rochester Americans	AHL	63	19	21	40	212	5	2	1	3	16
1985–86	Buffalo Sabres	NHL	16	2	1	3	20	—	—	—	—	—
AHL totals			208	51	65	116	750	40	9	11	20	122
NHL totals			22	3	1	4	22	—	—	—	—	—
