= Patrick Couture =

Canadian ice hockey player

- Born: May 28, 1978 (age 47) Quebec City, Quebec, Canada
- Height: 5 ft 11 in (180 cm)
- Weight: 174 lb (79 kg; 12 st 6 lb)
- Position: Goaltender
- Caught: Left
- Played for: AHL; Quebec Citadelles; WCHL; San Diego Gulls; WPHL; El Paso Buzzards; Phoenix Mustangs; ECHL; Columbia Inferno; UHL; Adirondack IceHawks; LNAH; Thetford Mines Isothermic; Pont Rouge Lois Jeans; Europe; EC Bad Tölz; Essen Mosquitoes
- NHL draft: Undrafted
- Playing career: 1998–2010

Patrick Couture (born May 28, 1978) is a Canadian former professional ice hockey goaltender.

Prior to turning professional, Couture played major junior hockey in the Quebec Major Junior Hockey League. Couture set the QMJHL's record, and still holds the Quebec Remparts' team record, for posting a goals against average (GAA) of just 1.85 during the 1997–98 QMJHL season.

== Awards and honours ==
Award	Year
ECHL Second All-Star Team	2002–03
