= Benoît Dusablon =

Canadian ice hockey player

- Born: August 1, 1979 (age 45); Sainte-Anne-de-la-Pérade, Quebec, Canada
- Height: 6 ft 2 in (188 cm)
- Weight: 212 lb (96 kg; 15 st 2 lb)
- Position: Centre
- Shot: Left
- Played for: New York Rangers
- NHL draft: Undrafted
- Playing career: 2000–2004

Benoît Dusablon (born August 1, 1979) is a Canadian former professional ice hockey centre. He played three games in the National Hockey League (NHL) with the New York Rangers during the 2003–04 season. The rest of his career, which lasted from 2000 to 2005, was spent in the minor leagues. As a youth, he played in the 1992 and 1993 Quebec International Pee-Wee Hockey Tournaments with minor ice hockey teams from Central Mauricie and Sainte-Foy, Quebec City.

== Career statistics ==
=== Regular season and playoffs ===
			Regular season					Playoffs
Season	Team	League	GP	G	A	Pts	PIM	GP	G	A	Pts	PIM
1995–96	Cap-de-la-Madeleine Estacades	QMAAA	43	19	31	50	71	—	—	—	—	—
1996–97	Halifax Mooseheads	QMJHL	61	7	7	14	181	14	0	3	3	4
1997–98	Halifax Mooseheads	QMJHL	7	1	0	1	7	—	—	—	—	—
1997–98	Val d'Or Foreurs	QMJHL	57	14	11	25	56	19	2	9	11	33
1997–98	Val d'Or Foreurs	M-Cup	—	—	—	—	—	3	0	1	1	2
1998–99	Val d'Or Foreurs	QMJHL	67	42	74	116	63	6	2	6	8	4
1999–00	Val d'Or Foreurs	QMJHL	41	29	53	82	45	—	—	—	—	—
1999–00	Halifax Mooseheads	QMJHL	31	18	35	53	18	10	6	7	13	12
1999–00	Halifax Mooseheads	M-Cup	—	—	—	—	—	4	3	3	6	0
2000–01	Johnstown Chiefs	ECHL	11	2	3	5	4	—	—	—	—	—
2000–01	Tallahassee Tiger Sharks	ECHL	49	21	29	50	33	—	—	—	—	—
2001–02	Hartford Wolf Pack	AHL	38	8	15	23	16	9	1	2	3	4
2001–02	Charlotte Checkers	ECHL	19	12	13	25	2	—	—	—	—	—
2002–03	Hartford Wolf Pack	AHL	50	8	16	24	41	1	0	0	0	0
2003–04	New York Rangers	NHL	3	0	0	0	2	—	—	—	—	—
2003–04	Hartford Wolf Pack	AHL	35	10	14	24	18	16	2	5	7	6
2003–04	Charlotte Checkers	ECHL	19	10	10	20	10	—	—	—	—	—
AHL totals			123	26	45	71	75	26	3	7	10	10
ECHL totals			98	45	55	100	49	—	—	—	—	—
NHL totals			3	0	0	0	2	—	—	—	—	—
