= Mathieu Garon =

Canadian ice hockey player (born 1978)

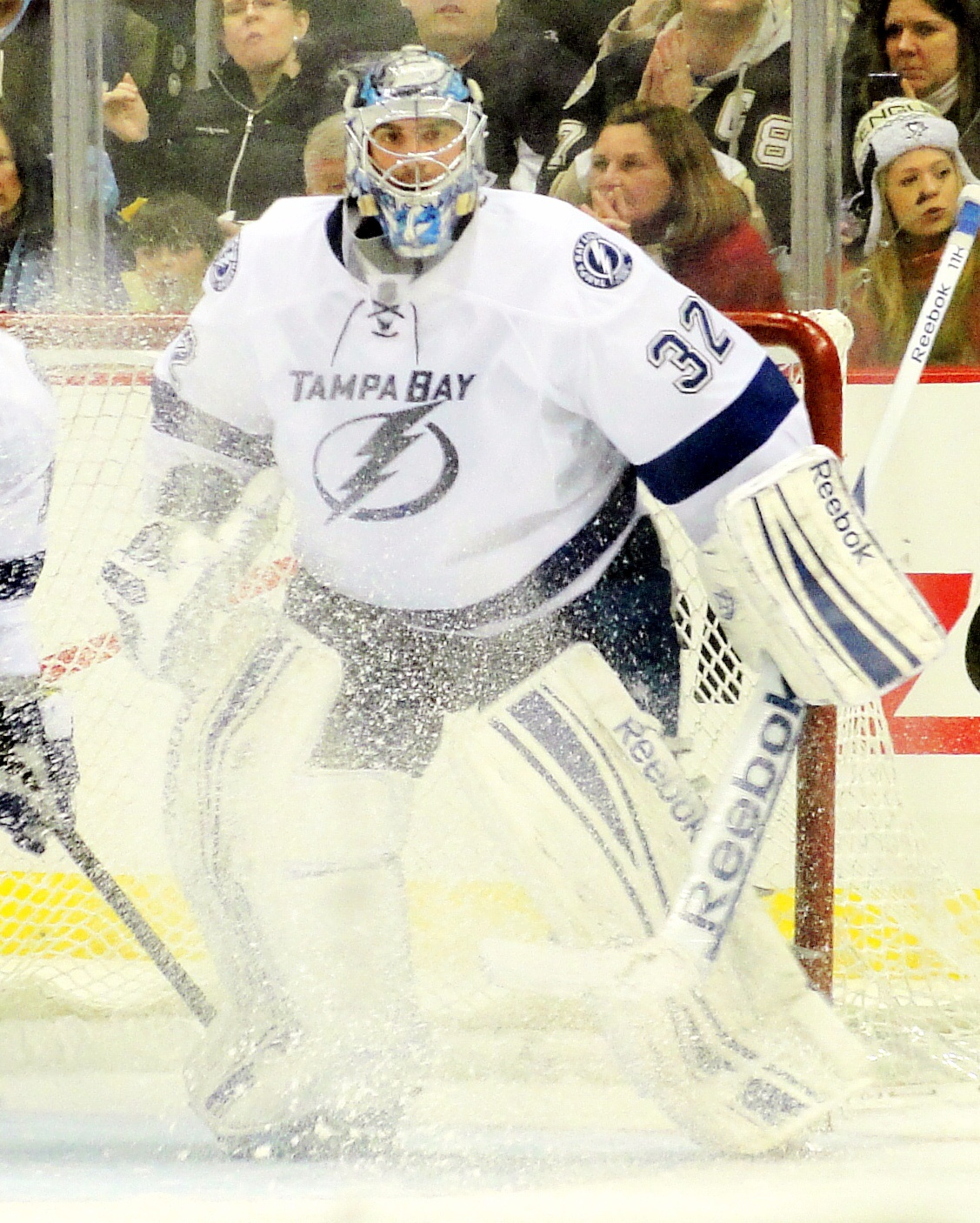
- Garon with the Lightning in 2012.
- Born: January 9, 1978 (age 48) Chandler, Quebec, Canada
- Height: 6 ft 1 in (185 cm)
- Weight: 193 lb (88 kg; 13 st 11 lb)
- Position: Goaltender
- Caught: Right
- Played for: Montreal Canadiens; Los Angeles Kings; Edmonton Oilers; Pittsburgh Penguins; Columbus Blue Jackets; Tampa Bay Lightning; Avangard Omsk
- National team: Canada
- NHL draft: 44th overall, 1996; Montreal Canadiens
- Playing career: 1997–2014

Mathieu Carol Garon (French pronunciation: [matjø ɡaʁɔ̃]; born January 9, 1978) is a Canadian former professional ice hockey goaltender. He played in the National Hockey League (NHL) for the Los Angeles Kings, Edmonton Oilers, Montreal Canadiens, Pittsburgh Penguins, Columbus Blue Jackets, and Tampa Bay Lightning between 2000 and 2013.

He was drafted 44th overall by the Montreal Canadiens in the 1996 NHL entry draft, and was also a member of the 2009 Stanley Cup-winning Pittsburgh Penguins, serving as the backup to Marc-Andre Fleury.

== Playing career ==
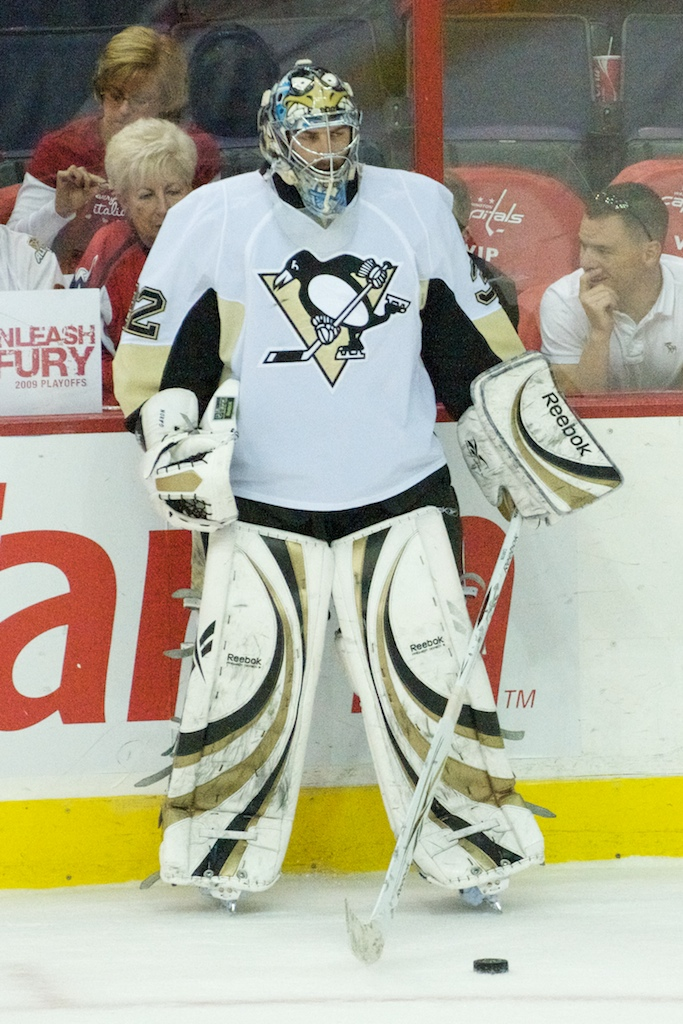
Garon with the Penguins in 2009.

As a youth, Garon played in the 1991 Quebec International Pee-Wee Hockey Tournament with a minor ice hockey team from Rimouski, Quebec.

Garon spent his junior career with the Victoriaville Tigres of the Quebec Major Junior Hockey League (QMJHL). In three seasons with the Tigres, Garon posted a 74–63–5 record. At the conclusion of the 1997–98 season, the last of his junior career, he won the Jacques Plante Memorial Trophy as the best goaltender in the QMJHL and was named to the QMJHL First All-Star Team. He was also named CHL Goaltender of the Year as the top goaltender in Canadian major junior hockey and to the CHL First All-Star team. Garon also played for Canada at the 1998 World Junior Championships in Finland when Canada finished eighth.

After being drafted by the Canadiens in the second round in 1996, Garon spent the first five seasons of his professional career playing primarily with the Canadiens' American Hockey League (AHL) affiliates, which included the Fredericton Canadiens, the Quebec Citadelles and the Hamilton Bulldogs. He was called up for brief stints with the Canadiens before he won the full-time back-up job with the team for the 2003–04 season. Garon played 19 games behind José Théodore that season, posting an 8–6–2 record, a 2.27 goals against average (GAA) and .921 save percentage.

In the summer of 2004, Garon was traded (along with a third-round draft pick) to the Los Angeles Kings for Radek Bonk and Cristobal Huet. During the 2004–05 NHL lockout, Garon played with the Kings' AHL affiliate, the Manchester Monarchs, posting an impressive 32–14–4 record, 2.12 GAA, .927 save percentage, and eight shutouts. This helped earn him the starting job with the Kings when NHL play resumed for the 2005–06 season. However, Garon struggled in the number one role and was relegated to backup for the 2006–07 season.

Following the 2006–07 season, Garon became an unrestricted free agent and on July 3, 2007, he signed a two-year, $2.2 million contract with the Edmonton Oilers. Garon split time with incumbent starter Dwayne Roloson and his strong play earned him 47 appearances through which he posted a 2.66 GAA, .913 save percentage, and four shutouts. Despite his efforts, the Oilers failed to qualify for the playoffs. However, Garon earned praise for going a perfect 10–0 in shootouts that season, stopping a remarkable 30 of 32 shot attempts in the process.

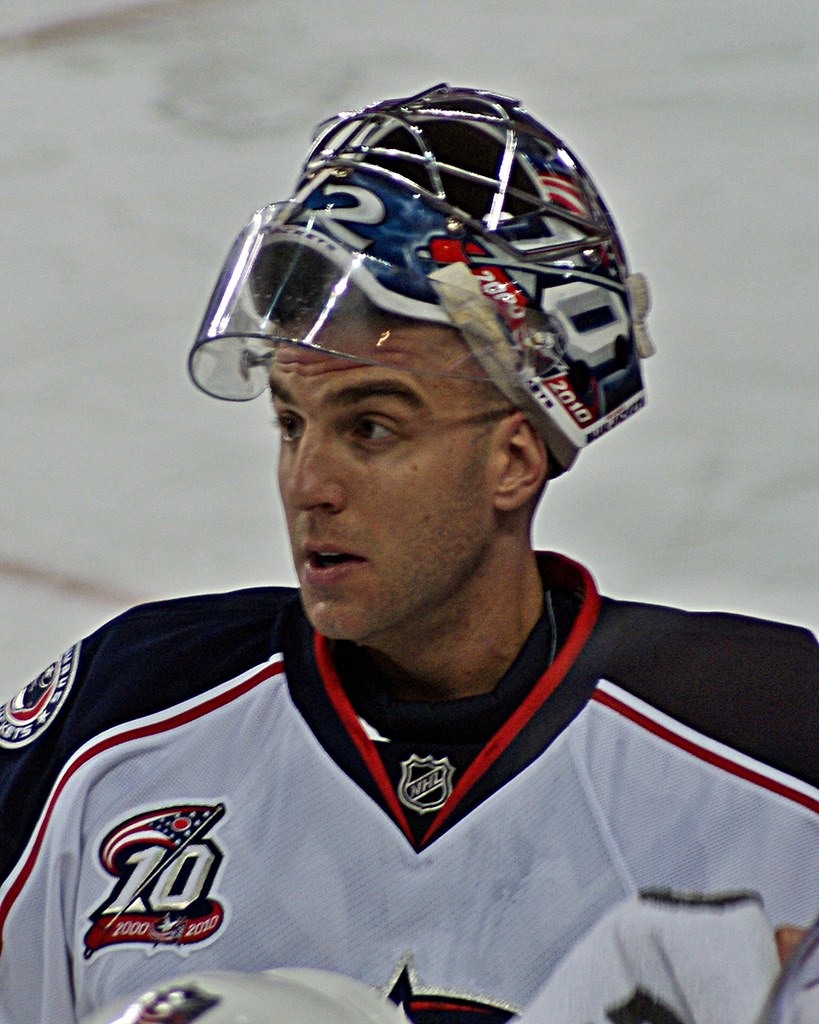
Garon with Columbus in 2010.

Garon was named to Canada's roster for the 2008 IIHF World Championship in Quebec City and Halifax, although he did not receive any playing time behind Cam Ward and Pascal Leclaire as Canada won the silver medal.

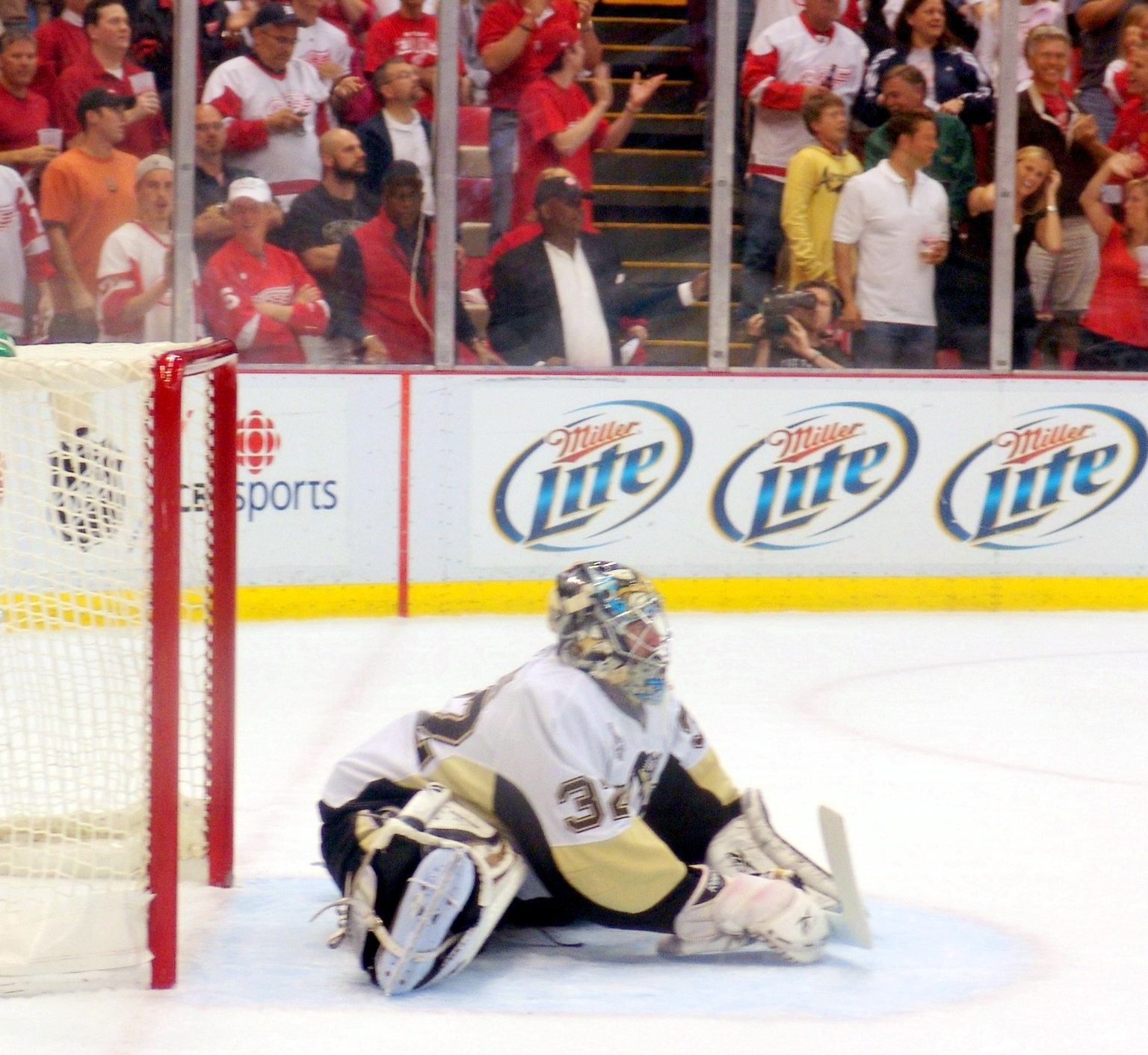
Garon relieved Fleury in game five of the 2009 Stanley Cup Final.

Roloson reemerged as Edmonton's undisputed starter in 2008–09 and on January 17, 2009, Garon was traded to the Pittsburgh Penguins in exchange for Ryan Stone, Dany Sabourin, and the Penguins' fourth-round pick in the 2011 NHL entry draft. Garon saw limited action behind starter Marc-André Fleury, who backstopped the Penguins to their third Stanley Cup championship, defeating the Detroit Red Wings in a seven-game rematch of the previous year's final. Garon's only appearance in the playoffs came in game five of the Final in relief of Fleury.

On July 1, 2009, Garon again became an unrestricted free agent and signed a two-year contract with the Columbus Blue Jackets worth $1.2 million per season. In his first season with the Blue Jackets, he appeared in 35 games and posted a 12–9–6 record backing-up Steve Mason, the winner of the 2009 Calder Memorial Trophy.

On July 1, 2011, Garon signed a two-year, $2.6 million contract with the Tampa Bay Lightning. This was the second team in which Garon and Roloson were teammates (after Edmonton).

After his contract expired, due to lack of interest from NHL teams, Garon pursued a career in the Kontinental Hockey League (KHL), signing with Avangard Omsk.

== Career statistics ==
=== Regular season and playoffs ===
			Regular season										Playoffs
Season	Team	League	GP	W	L	T	OTL	MIN	GA	SO	GAA	SV%	GP	W	L	MIN	GA	SO	GAA	SV%
1993–94	Jonquière Élites	QMAAA	17	0	13	0	—	834	88	0	6.33	—	—	—	—	—	—	—	—	—
1994–95	Jonquière Élites	QMAAA	27	13	13	1	—	1554	94	0	3.63	—	9	6	2	467	26	0	3.34	—
1995–96	Victoriaville Tigres	QMJHL	51	18	27	0	—	2709	189	1	4.19	.875	12	7	4	676	38	1	3.37	.887
1996–97	Victoriaville Tigres	QMJHL	53	29	18	3	—	3032	150	6	2.97	.902	6	2	4	330	23	0	4.18	.903
1997–98	Victoriaville Tigres	QMJHL	47	27	18	2	—	2802	125	5	2.68	.909	6	2	4	345	22	0	3.83	.851
1998–99	Fredericton Canadiens	AHL	40	14	22	2	—	2222	114	3	3.08	.904	6	1	1	208	12	0	3.46	.911
1999–00	Quebec Citadelles	AHL	53	17	28	3	—	2884	149	2	3.10	.898	1	0	0	20	3	0	9.00	.833
2000–01	Quebec Citadelles	AHL	31	16	13	1	—	1768	86	1	2.92	.920	8	4	4	459	22	1	2.88	.933
2000–01	Montreal Canadiens	NHL	11	4	5	1	—	589	24	2	2.44	.897	—	—	—	—	—	—	—	—
2001–02	Quebec Citadelles	AHL	50	21	15	12	—	2988	136	2	2.73	.918	3	0	3	198	12	0	3.64	.874
2001–02	Montreal Canadiens	NHL	5	1	4	0	—	261	19	0	4.37	.871	—	—	—	—	—	—	—	—
2002–03	Hamilton Bulldogs	AHL	20	15	2	2	—	1150	34	4	1.77	.937	—	—	—	—	—	—	—	—
2002–03	Montreal Canadiens	NHL	8	3	5	0	—	482	16	2	1.99	.940	—	—	—	—	—	—	—	—
2003–04	Montreal Canadiens	NHL	19	8	6	2	—	1003	38	0	2.27	.921	1	0	0	12	0	0	0.00	1.000
2004–05	Manchester Monarchs	AHL	52	32	14	4	—	2969	105	8	2.12	.927	6	2	4	285	17	0	3.58	.893
2005–06	Los Angeles Kings	NHL	63	31	26	—	3	3446	185	4	3.22	.894	—	—	—	—	—	—	—	—
2006–07	Los Angeles Kings	NHL	32	13	10	—	6	1779	79	2	2.66	.907	—	—	—	—	—	—	—	—
2007–08	Edmonton Oilers	NHL	47	26	18	—	1	2658	118	4	2.66	.913	—	—	—	—	—	—	—	—
2008–09	Edmonton Oilers	NHL	15	6	8	—	0	815	43	0	3.17	.895	—	—	—	—	—	—	—	—
2008–09	Pittsburgh Penguins	NHL	4	2	1	—	0	206	10	0	2.91	.894	1	0	0	24	0	0	0.00	1.000
2009–10	Columbus Blue Jackets	NHL	35	12	9	—	6	1771	83	2	2.81	.903	—	—	—	—	—	—	—	—
2010–11	Columbus Blue Jackets	NHL	36	10	14	—	6	1938	88	3	2.72	.901	—	—	—	—	—	—	—	—
2011–12	Tampa Bay Lightning	NHL	48	23	16	—	4	2484	118	1	2.85	.901	—	—	—	—	—	—	—	—
2012–13	Tampa Bay Lightning	NHL	18	5	9	—	2	910	44	0	2.90	.897	—	—	—	—	—	—	—	—
2013–14	Avangard Omsk	KHL	18	5	9	—	4	1096	43	0	2.35	.900	—	—	—	—	—	—	—	—
NHL totals			341	144	131	3	28	18,341	865	20	2.83	.903	2	0	0	36	0	0	0.00	1.000

=== International ===
Year	Team	Event	GP	W	L	T	MIN	GA	SO	GAA	SV%
1998	Canada	WJC	5	—	—	—	283	9	—	1.91	—
Junior totals			5	—	—	—	283	9	—	1.91	—
