= Chicoutimi Saguenéens =

Junior ice hockey team in Saguenay, Quebec

Chicoutimi Saguenéens Saguenéens de Chicoutimi
- City: Saguenay, Quebec, Canada
- League: Quebec Maritimes Junior Hockey League
- Conference: Eastern
- Division: East
- Founded: 1973
- Home arena: Centre Georges-Vézina
- Colours: Navy blue, baby blue, and white
- General manager: Yanick Jean
- Head coach: Yanick Jean
- Website: www.sagueneens.com/

Championships
- Playoff championships: 1991, 1994, 2026

Current uniform

The Chicoutimi Saguenéens are a Canadian junior ice hockey team which plays in the Quebec Maritimes Junior Hockey League (QMJHL). The team is based in Chicoutimi, Quebec, and owned by the City of Saguenay. The team plays its home games at the Centre Georges-Vézina.

== History ==
The Chicoutimi Saguenéens franchise was granted for the 1973–74 season. The team's name, Saguenéens, literally means "People from the Saguenay." The current junior team is only the most recent to use the name. The "Sags", as they are popularly nicknamed, have won the Gilles-Courteau Trophy three times in their history (1990–91, 1993–94, and 2025–26). In all three instances, they advanced to the Memorial Cup, failing to advance past the round-robin stage on the first two occasions. The Sags also participated in the 1997 Memorial Cup, as the host Hull Olympiques had won the QMJHL title that year; the Saguenéens also did not advance past the round-robin that year. Finally, the Centre Georges-Vézina hosted Memorial Cup festivities in 1988, but the team did not participate as then-current QMJHL rules forced the host team to make it to at least the President's Cup final, which the Saguenéens did not do in that year.

== Yearly results ==
Legend: OTL = Overtime loss, SL = Shootout loss

Season	Games	Won	Lost	Tied	OTL	SL	Points	Pct %	Goals for	Goals against	Standing	Playoffs
1973–74	70	21	49	0	-	-	42	0.300	269	457	5th East	Did not qualify
1974–75	72	24	42	6	-	-	54	0.375	315	420	3rd East	Semifinals
1975–76	72	29	31	12	-	-	70	0.486	353	372	3rd East	1st Round
1976–77	72	42	24	6	-	-	90	0.625	393	357	2nd Dilio	1st Round
1977–78	72	16	45	11	-	-	43	0.299	335	458	4th Dilio	Did not qualify
1978–79	72	26	36	10	-	-	62	0.431	337	346	4th Dilio	1st Round
1979–80	72	42	27	3	-	-	87	0.604	442	347	2nd Dilio	Semifinals
1980–81	72	41	30	1	-	-	83	0.576	389	364	2nd Dilio	Semifinals
1981–82	64	31	31	2	-	-	64	0.500	296	310	6th QMJHL	Semifinals
1982–83	70	37	32	1	-	-	75	0.536	397	388	2nd Dilio	1st Round
1983–84	70	30	38	2	-	-	62	0.443	303	382	4th Dilio	Did not qualify
1984–85	68	41	23	4	-	-	89	0.632	334	288	2nd Dilio	Finals
1985–86	72	34	34	4	-	-	72	0.500	393	351	3rd Dilio	1st Round
1986–87	70	37	28	5	-	-	79	0.564	411	353	3rd Dilio	Finals
1987–88	70	38	31	1	-	-	77	0.550	352	318	1st Dilio	1st Round
1988–89	70	32	37	1	-	-	65	0.464	335	348	9th QMJHL	Did not qualify
1989–90	70	34	33	3	-	-	71	0.507	280	297	8th QMJHL	1st Round
1990–91	70	43	21	6	-	-	92	0.657	299	223	1st Dilio	Won Finals
1991–92	70	31	33	6	-	-	68	0.486	279	304	3rd Dilio	1st Round
1992–93	70	38	29	3	-	-	79	0.564	342	321	3rd Dilio	1st Round
1993–94	72	43	24	5	-	-	91	0.632	340	254	1st Dilio	Won Finals
1994–95	72	38	29	5	-	-	81	0.562	290	269	3rd Dilio	1st Round
1995–96	70	35	29	6	-	-	76	0.543	274	242	2nd Dilio	Semifinals
1996–97	70	37	30	3	-	-	77	0.550	271	222	4th Dilio	Finals
1997–98	70	36	33	1	-	-	73	0.521	272	285	3rd Dilio	Did not qualify
1998–99	70	20	48	2	-	-	42	0.300	200	344	8th Dilio	Did not qualify
1999–2000	72	22	44	3	3	-	50	0.326	226	320	4th East	Did not qualify
2000–01	72	22	39	10	1	-	55	0.375	242	313	3rd East	1st Round
2001–02	72	40	27	1	4	-	85	0.562	278	269	1st East	1st Round
2002–03	72	28	40	1	3	-	60	0.396	239	292	3rd East	1st Round
2003–04	70	32	27	7	4	-	75	0.507	218	220	2nd East	Semifinals
2004–05	70	38	19	6	7	-	89	0.586	264	217	2nd East	Semifinals
2005–06	70	51	15	-	2	2	106	0.750	321	185	2nd West	2nd Round
2006–07	70	34	28	-	7	1	76	0.543	235	236	8th Telus	1st Round
2007–08	70	37	25	-	2	6	82	0.529	235	203	4th Telus	1st Round
2008–09	68	24	32	-	4	8	60	0.353	215	256	3rd East	1st Round
2009–10	68	26	33	-	4	5	61	0.581	197	220	3rd East	1st Round
2010–11	68	27	29	-	5	7	66	0.485	197	220	5th East	1st Round
2011–12	68	35	24	-	3	6	79	0.581	235	232	5th East	Semifinals
2012–13	68	30	31	-	2	5	67	0.493	198	225	5th East	1st Round
2013–14	68	27	40	-	1	0	55	0.404	183	254	5th East	1st Round
2014–15	68	29	32	-	4	3	65	0.478	203	238	5th East	1st Round
2015–16	68	32	25	-	5	6	75	0.551	223	217	3rd East	1st Round
2016–17	68	38	25	-	3	2	81	0.596	206	205	2nd East	Semifinals
2017–18	68	28	35	-	4	1	61	0.449	200	233	5th East	1st Round
2018–19	68	39	22	-	3	4	85	0.625	218	205	3rd East	1st Round
2019–20	63	45	12	-	5	1	96	0.762	256	182	1st East	QMJHL playoffs cancelled
2020–21	29	17	7	-	3	2	39	0.672	105	77	1st East	Semifinals
2021–22	68	27	35	-	1	5	60	0.441	206	264	3rd East	1st Round
2022–23	68	33	31	-	3	1	70	0.515	234	281	2nd East	1st Round
2023–24	68	35	25	-	4	4	78	0.574	247	229	3rd East	2nd Round
2024–25	64	36	18	-	3	7	82	0.641	238	204	2nd East	2nd Round
2025–26	64	49	10	-	3	2	103	0.805	321	150	2nd Eastern	Won Finals

== Playoffs ==
Season	1st round	2nd round	3rd round	Finals
1997–98	L, 2–4, Moncton	–	–	–
1998–99	Did not qualify			
1999–2000	Did not qualify			
2000–01	L, 3–4, Cape Breton	–	–	–
2001–02	L, 0–4, Quebec	–	–	–
2002–03	L, 2–4, Acadie–Bathurst	–	–	–
2003–04	W, 4–3, Val-d'Or	W, 4–1, Cape Breton	L, 2–4, Gatineau	–
2004–05	W, 4–2, Baie-Comeau	W, 4–2, Quebec	L, 1–4, Rimouski	–
2005–06	W, 4–0, Baie-Comeau	L, 1–4, Gatineau	–	–
2006–07	L, 0–4, Val-d'Or	–	–	–
2007–08	L, 2–4, Quebec	–	–	–
2008–09	L, 0–4, Rimouski	–	–	–
2009–10	L, 3–4, Rimouski	–	–	–
2010–11	L, 0–4, Drummondville	–	–	–
2011–12	W, 4–2, Acadie–Bathurst	W, 4–3, Shawinigan	L, 1–4, Saint John	–
2012–13	L, 2–4, Quebec	–	–	–
2013–14	L, 0–4, Rimouski	–	–	–
2014–15	L, 1–4, Moncton	–	–	–
2015–16	L, 2–4, Cape Breton	–	–	–
2016–17	W, 4–0, Victoriaville	W, 4–3, Rouyn-Noranda	L, 2–4, Saint John	–
2017–18	L, 2–4, Acadie–Bathurst	–	–	–
2018–19	L, 0–4, Rimouski	–	–	–
2019–20	QMJHL playoffs cancelled			
2020–21	W, 3–0, Sherbrooke	W, 3–0, Quebec	L, 0–3, Val-d'Or	–
2021–22	L, 0–3, Quebec	–	–	–
2022–23	L, 1–4, Rimouski	–	–	–
2023–24	W, 4–0, Moncton	L, 0–4, Cape Breton	–	–
2024–25	W, 4–1, Acadie–Bathurst	L, 2–4, Rimouski	–	–
2025–26	W, 4–0, Halifax	W, 4–0, Quebec	W, 4–2, Rouyn-Noranda	W, 4–2, Moncton

== Players ==
=== NHL alumni ===
- Ramzi Abid
- Frederic Allard
- Joel Baillargeon
- Ľuboš Bartečko
- Marc Bergevin
- Daniel Berthiaume
- Nicolas Blanchard
- Michel Bolduc
- Pierre-Marc Bouchard
- François Breault
- Julien Brouillette
- Paul Brousseau
- Marc Bureau
- Guy Carbonneau
- Stéphane Charbonneau
- Denis Chassé
- Alain Côté
- Patrick Coulombe
- Glen Cressman
- Louis Crevier
- Laurent Dauphin
- Gilbert Delorme
- Marc Denis
- Nicolas Deschamps
- David Desharnais
- Gord Donnelly
- Daniel Doré
- Jeff Drouin-Deslauriers
- Luc Dufour
- Éric Fichaud
- Marc Fortier
- Éric Gélinas
- Christopher Gibson
- David Gosselin
- Denis Hamel
- Gilles Hamel
- Alan Haworth
- Yves Héroux
- Charles Hudon
- Chris Langevin
- Hendrix Lapierre
- Steve Larouche
- Raphaël Lavoie
- Alain Lemieux
- Normand Léveillé
- Daniel Marois
- Stéphane Morin
- Alain Nasreddine
- Jean-Gabriel Pageau
- Pierre-Alexandre Parenteau
- Félix Potvin
- Daniel Poulin
- Yves Preston
- Jean-Marc Richard
- Stéphane Richer
- Antoine Roussel
- André Roy
- Nicolas Roy
- Stéphane Roy
- German Rubtsov
- Lukáš Sedlák
- Louis Sleigher
- Sam St. Laurent
- Radoslav Suchý
- Bob Sullivan
- Jimmy Waite

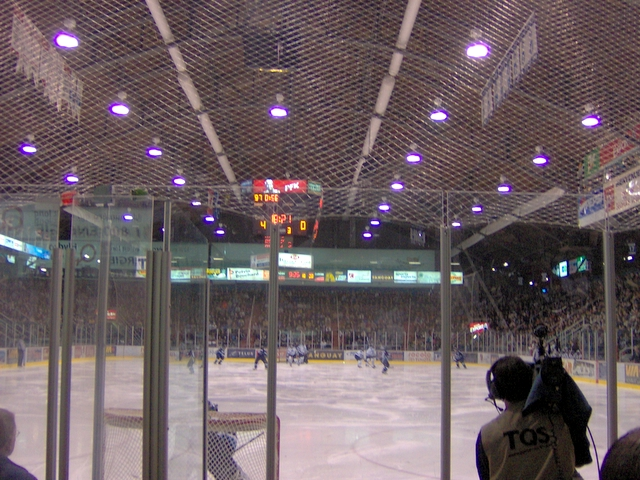
Centre Georges-Vézina, home of the Chicoutimi Saguenéens.

=== Retired numbers ===
- 14 – Alain Côté
- 15 – David Desharnais
- 16 – Normand Leveille
- 18 – Sylvain Locas
- 20 – Marc Fortier
- 21 – Guy Carbonneau
- 29 – Félix Potvin
- 33 – Marc Denis
