= 1998–99 QMJHL season =

Canadian junior ice hockey season

The 1998–99 QMJHL season was the 30th season in the history of the Quebec Major Junior Hockey League (QMJHL). The league continued its trend of teams relocating into the Atlantic Canada market, when Laval moved to Bathurst, New Brunswick. Fifteen teams played seventy games each in the schedule. The Quebec Remparts repeated as first overall in the regular season winning their second consecutive Jean Rougeau Trophy. The Acadie-Bathurst Titan won the President's Cup, defeating the Hull Olympiques in the finals.

== Team changes ==
- Laval Titan Collège Français relocated to Bathurst, New Brunswick, becoming the Acadie-Bathurst Titan, and switched to the Dilio Division.
- The Sherbrooke Faucons are renamed the Sherbrooke Castors, reviving a historic franchise name.

== Final standings ==
Note: GP = Games played; W = Wins; L = Losses; T = Ties; PTS = Points; GF = Goals for; GA = Goals against

Dilio Division	GP	W	L	T	Pts	GF	GA
Quebec Remparts	70	51	13	6	108	316	207
Halifax Mooseheads	70	46	20	4	96	298	206
Acadie–Bathurst Titan	70	42	25	3	87	315	255
Moncton Wildcats	70	38	25	7	81	257	235
Rimouski Océanic	70	30	32	8	68	270	263
Cape Breton Screaming Eagles	70	22	44	4	48	226	272
Baie-Comeau Drakkar	70	18	44	8	44	208	297
Chicoutimi Saguenéens	70	20	48	2	42	200	344

Lebel Division	GP	W	L	T	Pts	GF	GA
Shawinigan Cataractes	70	44	22	4	92	275	212
Rouyn-Noranda Huskies	70	36	23	11	83	314	261
Victoriaville Tigres	70	34	30	6	74	275	253
Sherbrooke Castors	70	31	34	5	67	268	272
Val-d'Or Foreurs	70	30	35	5	65	312	319
Hull Olympiques	70	23	38	9	55	276	298
Drummondville Voltigeurs	70	18	48	4	40	233	349

- complete list of standings.

== Scoring leaders ==
Note: GP = Games played; G = Goals; A = Assists; Pts = Points; PIM = Penalty minutes

Player	Team	GP	G	A	Pts	PIM
Mike Ribeiro	Rouyn-Noranda Huskies	69	67	100	167	137
James Desmarais	Rouyn-Noranda Huskies	66	62	73	135	127
Jérôme Tremblay	Rouyn-Noranda Huskies	69	38	94	132	36
Brad Richards	Rimouski Océanic	59	39	92	131	55
Ladislav Nagy	Halifax Mooseheads	63	71	55	126	148
Simon Gagné	Quebec Remparts	61	50	70	120	42
Benoît Dusablon	Val-d'Or Foreurs	67	42	74	116	63
Patrick Grandmaître	Victoriaville Tigres	70	37	78	115	139
Mathieu Benoît	Chicoutimi / Acadie-Bathurst	68	62	47	109	34
Eric Chouinard	Quebec Remparts	62	50	59	109	56

- complete scoring statistics

== Playoffs ==
Mathieu Benoît was the leading scorer of the playoffs with 41 points (20 goals, 21 assists).

Division Quarterfinals	Division Semifinals
D1	Quebec	4
D4	Rimouski	3
D4	Moncton	0
D5	Rimouski	4
Dillo Division
D2	Halifax	1
D3	Acadie Bathurst	4
D3	Acadie-Bathurst	4
D6	Cape Breton	1
L2	Rouyn-Noranda	4
L4	Sherbrooke	3
L4	Sherbrooke	4
L5	Val-d'Or	2
L1	Shawinigan	2
L6	Hull	4
L3	Victoriaville	2
L6	Hull	4

Division Finals
D1	Quebec	2
D3	Acadie-Bathurst	4
L2	Rouyn-Noranda	0
L6	Hull	4

President's Cup Final
D3	Acadie-Bathurst	4
L6	Hull	3

== All-star teams ==
First team

- Goaltender – Mathieu Chouinard, Shawinigan Cataractes
- Left defence – Jiri Fischer, Hull Olympiques
- Right defence – Jonathan Girard, Acadie-Bathurst Titan
- Left winger – Jérôme Tremblay, Rouyn-Noranda Huskies
- Centreman – Mike Ribeiro, Rouyn-Noranda Huskies
- Right winger – James Desmarais, Rouyn-Noranda Huskies
- Coach – Guy Chouinard, Quebec Remparts

Second team

- Goaltender – Maxime Ouellet, Quebec Remparts
- Left defence – Simon Tremblay, Quebec Remparts
- Right defence – Dmitri Tolkunov, Quebec Remparts
- Left winger – David Thibeault, Victoriaville Tigres
- Centreman – Simon Gagné, Quebec Remparts
- Right winger – Mathieu Benoît, Chicoutimi Saguenéens / Acadie-Bathurst Titan
- Coach – Denis Francoeur, Shawinigan Cataractes

Rookie team

- Goaltender – Alexei Volkov, Halifax Mooseheads
- Left defence – Andrew Carver, Hull Olympiques
- Right defence – Dimitri Kalinin, Moncton Wildcats
- Left winger – Juraj Kolnik, Quebec Remparts / Rimouski Océanic
- Centreman – Ladislav Nagy, Halifax Mooseheads
- Right winger – Guillaume Lamoureux, Val-d'Or Foreurs
- Coach – Bruce Campbell, Cape Breton Screaming Eagles
- List of First/Second/Rookie team all-stars.

== Trophies and awards ==
Team

- President's Cup – Playoff Champions, Acadie-Bathurst Titan
- Jean Rougeau Trophy – Regular Season Champions, Quebec Remparts
- Robert Lebel Trophy – Team with best GAA, Halifax Mooseheads

Player

- Michel Brière Memorial Trophy – Most Valuable Player, Mathieu Chouinard, Shawinigan Cataractes
- Jean Béliveau Trophy – Top Scorer, Mike Ribeiro, Rouyn-Noranda Huskies
- Guy Lafleur Trophy – Playoff MVP, Mathieu Benoît, Acadie-Bathurst Titan
- Telus Cup – Offensive – Offensive Player of the Year, James Desmarais, Rouyn-Noranda Huskies
- Telus Cup – Defensive – Defensive Player of the Year, Mathieu Chouinard, Shawinigan Cataractes
- AutoPro Plaque – Best plus/minus total, Simon Tremblay, Quebec Remparts
- Philips Plaque – Best faceoff percentage, Éric Demers, Moncton Wildcats
- Jacques Plante Memorial Trophy – Best GAA, Maxime Ouellet, Quebec Remparts
- Emile Bouchard Trophy – Defenceman of the Year, Jiri Fischer, Hull Olympiques
- Mike Bossy Trophy – Best Pro Prospect, Maxime Ouellet, Quebec Remparts
- RDS Cup – Rookie of the Year, Ladislav Nagy, Halifax Mooseheads
- Michel Bergeron Trophy – Offensive Rookie of the Year, Ladislav Nagy, Halifax Mooseheads
- Raymond Lagacé Trophy – Defensive Rookie of the Year, Alexei Volkov, Halifax Mooseheads
- Frank J. Selke Memorial Trophy – Most sportsmanlike player, Eric Chouinard, Quebec Remparts
- QMJHL Humanitarian of the Year – Humanitarian of the Year, Philippe Sauvé, Rimouski Océanic
- Marcel Robert Trophy – Best Scholastic Player, Christian Robichaud, Victoriaville Tigres
- Paul Dumont Trophy – Personality of the Year, Simon Gagné, Quebec Remparts

Executive

- Ron Lapointe Trophy – Coach of the Year, Guy Chouinard, Quebec Remparts
- John Horman Trophy – Executive of the Year, Charles Henry, Hull Olympiques
- St-Clair Group Plaque – Marketing Director of the Year, Matt McKnight, Halifax Mooseheads

== See also ==
- 1999 Memorial Cup
- 1999 NHL entry draft
- 1998–99 OHL season
- 1998–99 WHL season

Preceded by 1997–98 QMJHL season	QMJHL seasons	Succeeded by 1999–2000 QMJHL season
