= 1999–2000 QMJHL season =

Canadian junior ice hockey season

The 1999–2000 QMJHL season was the 31st season in the history of the Quebec Major Junior Hockey League. The league grants the Montreal Rocket an expansion franchise, returning a team to the most populous city in Quebec. The QMJHL splits into four divisions, retaining the names Lebel and Dilio for its conferences. The Lebel conference is split into the West and Central divisions, and the Dilio Conference is split into the East and Maritime divisions.

The overtime loss statistic is adopted by the Canadian Hockey League. The QMJHL had previously experiment with a single point awarded for an overtime loss in the 1984–85 QMJHL season. Sixteen teams played seventy-two games each in the schedule.

Brad Richards of the Rimouski Océanic is the top scorer in the league, wins the regular season and playoff MVP awards, and three other individual awards at the season's end. Richards helped Rimouski finish first overall in the regular season winning their first Jean Rougeau Trophy, and their first President's Cup, defeating the Hull Olympiques in the finals.

== Team changes ==
- The Montreal Rocket join the league as an expansion franchise, playing in the West Division of the Lebel Conference.

== Final standings ==
Note: GP = Games played; W = Wins; L = Losses; T = Ties; OTL = Overtime loss; PTS = Points; GF = Goals for; GA = Goals against

=== Lebel Conference ===
West Division	GP	W	L	T	OL	Pts	GF	GA
Hull Olympiques	72	42	24	6	0	90	339	256
Rouyn-Noranda Huskies	72	33	33	4	2	72	272	288
Montreal Rocket	72	29	32	6	5	69	276	313
Val-d'Or Foreurs	72	19	41	7	5	50	244	267
Central Division	GP	W	L	T	OL	Pts	GF	GA
Shawinigan Cataractes	72	37	25	5	5	84	295	257
Drummondville Voltigeurs	72	38	29	4	1	81	307	280
Sherbrooke Castors	72	35	28	7	2	79	267	255
Victoriaville Tigres	72	27	36	3	6	63	286	316

=== Dilio Conference ===
East Division	GP	W	L	T	OTL	Pts	GF	GA
Rimouski Océanic	72	48	18	4	2	102	370	274
Quebec Remparts	72	44	20	4	4	96	289	213
Baie-Comeau Drakkar	72	31	31	5	5	72	257	285
Chicoutimi Saguenéens	72	22	44	3	3	50	226	320
Maritime Division	GP	W	L	T	OTL	Pts	GF	GA
Moncton Wildcats	72	44	20	5	3	96	292	211
Halifax Mooseheads	72	41	20	6	5	93	316	259
Cape Breton Screaming Eagles	72	24	39	3	6	57	230	302
Acadie-Bathurst Titan	72	20	40	8	4	52	227	311

- complete list of standings.

== Scoring leaders ==
Note: GP = Games played; G = Goals; A = Assists; Pts = Points; PIM = Penalty minutes

Player	Team	GP	G	A	Pts	PIM
Brad Richards	Rimouski Océanic	63	71	115	186	69
Ramzi Abid	Acadie-Bathurst / Halifax	72	67	91	158	209
Simon Gamache	Val-d'Or Foreurs	72	64	79	143	74
Benoît Dusablon	Val-d'Or / Halifax	72	47	88	135	63
Marc-André Thinel	Victoriaville Tigres	71	59	73	132	55
Jonathan Roy	Drummondville / Moncton	73	64	61	125	50
Carl Mallette	Victoriaville Tigres	69	49	76	125	97
Brandon Reid	Halifax Mooseheads	62	44	80	124	10
Jérôme Tremblay	Rouyn-Noranda Huskies	71	46	70	116	83
Dominic Forget	Shawinigan Cataractes	67	38	78	116	28

- complete scoring statistics

== Playoffs ==
Brad Richards was the leading scorer of the playoffs with 37 points (13 goals, 24 assists).

Conference Quarterfinals
D4	Halifax	4
D5	Baie-Comeau	2
D2	Moncton	4
D7	Acadie-Bathurst	0
D3	Quebec	4
D6	Cape Breton	0
L4	Sherbrooke	1
L5	Rouyn-Noranda	4
L2	Shawinigan	4
L7	Victoriaville	2
L3	Drummondville	4
L6	Montreal	1

Conference Semifinals
D1	Rimouski	4
D4	Halifax	0
D2	Moncton	4
D3	Quebec	3
L1	Hull	4
L5	Rouyn-Noranda	2
L2	Shawinigan	3
L3	Drummondville	4

Conference Finals
D1	Rimouski	4
D2	Moncton	1
L1	Hull	4
L3	Drummondville	0

President's Cup Final
D1	Rimouski	4
L1	Hull	1

== All-star teams ==
First team

- Goaltender – Simon Lajeunesse, Moncton Wildcats
- Left defence – Michel Periard, Rimouski Océanic
- Right defence – Jonathan Girard, Moncton Wildcats
- Left winger – Ramzi Abid, Acadie-Bathurst Titan / Halifax Mooseheads
- Centreman – Brad Richards, Rimouski Océanic
- Right winger – Marc-André Thinel, Victoriaville Tigres
- Coach – Doris Labonte, Rimouski Océanic

Second team

- Goaltender – Maxime Ouellet, Quebec Remparts
- Left defence – François Beauchemin, Acadie-Bathurst Titan / Moncton Wildcats
- Right defence – Jonathan Gauthier, Rouyn-Noranda Huskies
- Left winger – Simon Gamache, Val-d'Or Foreurs
- Centreman – Brandon Reid, Halifax Mooseheads
- Right winger – Mathieu Benoît, Acadie-Bathurst Titan / Moncton Wildcats
- Coach – Jean Pronovost, Rouyn-Noranda Huskies

Rookie team

- Goaltender – Ghislain Rousseau, Baie-Comeau Drakkar
- Left defence – Kirill Safronov, Quebec Remparts
- Right defence – Kristian Kudroc, Quebec Remparts
- Left winger – Frédéric Faucher, Drummondville Voltigeurs
- Centreman – Chris Montgomery, Montreal Rocket
- Right winger – Maxime Bouchard, Rouyn-Noranda Huskies
- Coach – Pascal Vincent, Cape Breton Screaming Eagles
- List of First/Second/Rookie team all-stars.

== Trophies and awards ==
Team

- President's Cup – Playoff Champions, Rimouski Océanic
- Jean Rougeau Trophy – Regular Season Champions, Rimouski Océanic
- Robert Lebel Trophy – Team with best GAA, Moncton Wildcats

Player

- Michel Brière Memorial Trophy – Most Valuable Player, Brad Richards, Rimouski Océanic
- Jean Béliveau Trophy – Top Scorer, Brad Richards, Rimouski Océanic
- Guy Lafleur Trophy – Playoff MVP, Brad Richards, Rimouski Océanic
- Telus Cup – Offensive – Offensive Player of the Year, Brad Richards, Rimouski Océanic
- Telus Cup – Defensive – Defensive Player of the Year, Simon Lajeunesse, Moncton Wildcats
- AutoPro Plaque – Best plus/minus total, Brad Richards, Rimouski Océanic
- Philips Plaque – Best faceoff percentage, Éric Pinoul, Sherbrooke Castors
- Jacques Plante Memorial Trophy – Best GAA, Simon Lajeunesse, Moncton Wildcats
- Emile Bouchard Trophy – Defenceman of the Year, Michel Periard, Rimouski Océanic
- Mike Bossy Trophy – Best Pro Prospect, Antoine Vermette, Victoriaville Tigres
- RDS Cup – Rookie of the Year, Christopher Montgomery, Montreal Rocket
- Michel Bergeron Trophy – Offensive Rookie of the Year, Christopher Montgomery, Montreal Rocket
- Raymond Lagacé Trophy – Defensive Rookie of the Year, Kirill Safronov, Quebec Remparts
- Frank J. Selke Memorial Trophy – Most sportsmanlike player, Jonathan Roy, Moncton Wildcats
- QMJHL Humanitarian of the Year – Humanitarian of the Year, Simon Gamache, Val-d'Or Foreurs
- Marcel Robert Trophy – Best Scholastic Player, Yanick Lehoux, Baie-Comeau Drakkar
- Paul Dumont Trophy – Personality of the Year, Brad Richards, Rimouski Océanic

Executive

- Ron Lapointe Trophy – Coach of the Year, Doris Labonte, Rimouski Océanic
- John Horman Trophy – Executive of the Year, Maurice Tanguay, Rimouski Océanic
- St-Clair Group Plaque – Marketing Director of the Year, Genevieve Lussier, Sherbrooke Castors

== See also ==
- 2000 Memorial Cup
- 2000 NHL entry draft
- 1999–2000 OHL season
- 1999–2000 WHL season

Preceded by 1998–99 QMJHL season	QMJHL seasons	Succeeded by 2000–01 QMJHL season
