= Victoriaville Tigres =

Junior ice hockey team in Victoriaville, Quebec

Victoriaville Tigres Tigres de Victoriaville
- City: Victoriaville, Quebec
- League: Quebec Maritimes Junior Hockey League
- Conference: Western
- Division: Central
- Founded: 1982
- Home arena: Colisée Desjardins
- Colours: Yellow, white and black
- General manager: Kevin Cloutier
- Head coach: Carl Mallette
- Website: www.tigresvictoriaville.com

Franchise history
- 1982–1987: Longueuil Chevaliers
- 1987–present: Victoriaville Tigres

Championships
- Playoff championships: QMJHL Champions; 2002, 2021

The Victoriaville Tigres are a Canadian junior ice hockey team that plays in the Quebec Maritimes Junior Hockey League. The team is based in Victoriaville, Quebec. The team plays its home games at the Colisée Desjardins.

== History ==
The franchise was granted for the 1982–83 season in Longueuil, Quebec, where they were known as the Longueuil Chevaliers. In 1987, the team moved to Victoriaville by owner, Gilles Lupien. The Tigres won the President's Cup in 2002 and 2021 and went to the 2002 Memorial Cup finals, which they lost to the Kootenay Ice.

== NHL alumni ==
List of Victoriaville Tigres who have played in the National Hockey League.

- Vitalii Abramov
- Pierre Aubry
- Matthew Barnaby
- Sammy Blais
- Max Comtois
- Daniel Corso
- Alexandre Daigle
- Phillip Danault
- Jason Demers
- Stéphane Fiset
- Mathieu Garon
- Daniel Gauthier
- Yanni Gourde
- Martin Grenier
- Daniel Guerard
- Ross Johnston
- Marc LaBelle
- Patrick Lebeau
- François Leroux
- Matthew Lombardi
- Johnny Oduya
- Kevin Poulin
- André Racicot
- Yves Racine
- Jean-Marc Routhier
- Yves Sarault
- Reggie Savage
- P. J. Stock
- Stéphane Veilleux
- Antoine Vermette

== Yearly results ==
OL = Overtime loss, SL = Shootout loss, Pct = Winning percentage

Season	Games	Won	Lost	Tied	OL	SL	Points	Pct	Goals for	Goals against	Standing	Playoff
1987–88	70	33	31	6	-	-	72	0.514	298	293	3rd, Dilio	Lost 1st round
1988–89	70	41	27	2	-	-	84	0.600	320	267	4th	Lost Finals
1989–90	70	42	23	5	5	-	89	0.636	314	223	1st	Lost Finals
1990–91	70	10	59	1	0	-	21	0.150	209	436	6th, Dillo	Out of Playoffs
1991–92	70	16	52	2	2	-	34	0.243	243	388	6th, Dillo	Out of Playoffs
1992–93	70	43	26	1	2	-	87	0.621	358	296	6th, Dillo	Lost 1st round
1993–94	72	17	51	4	2	-	38	0.264	261	404	6th, Dillo	Lost 1st round
1994–95	72	24	45	3	4	-	51	0.354	266	371	7th, Dillo	Lost 1st round
1995–96	70	27	41	2	2	-	56	0.400	246	289	5th, Dillo	Lost 2nd round
1996–97	70	43	23	4	1	-	90	0.643	304	216	1st, Dillo	Lost 2nd round
1997–98	70	40	20	7	-	-	87	0.621	215	209	2nd, Lebel	Lost 1st round
1998–99	70	34	30	6	-	-	74	0.529	208	253	3rd, Lebel	Lost 1st round
1999–2000	72	36	31	3	6	-	63	0.438	316	285	4th, Centre	Lost 1st round
2000–01	72	45	21	3	3	-	96	0.667	341	269	4th, Centre	Lost 2nd round
2001–02	72	40	25	6	1	-	87	0.604	287	257	2nd, Centre	President's Cup champion
2002–03	72	38	26	6	2	-	84	0.583	265	237	1st, Centre	Lost 1st round
2003–04	70	20	43	5	2	-	47	0.336	204	295	6th, Ouest	Out of Playoffs
2004–05	70	26	36	4	4	-	60	0.429	186	254	5th, Ouest	Lost 1st round
2005–06	70	26	42	-	1	1	54	0.386	226	302	9th, Western	Lost 1st round
2006–07	70	38	25	-	3	4	83	0.593	264	240	2nd, Telus	Lost 1st round
2007–08	70	29	37	-	2	2	62	0.443	224	276	9th, Telus	Lost 1st round
2008–09	68	32	32	-	2	2	68	0.500	219	249	3rd, Telus Centre	Lost 1st round
2009–10	68	46	19	-	1	2	95	0.699	296	191	2nd, Telus Centre	Lost 3rd round
2010–11	68	35	29	-	1	3	74	0.544	151	240	3rd, East	Lost 2nd round
2011–12	68	44	18	-	1	5	94	0.691	311	228	2nd, Telus East	Lost 1st round
2012–13	68	32	27	-	3	6	73	0.537	234	226	4th, East	Lost 2nd round
2013–14	68	33	27	-	5	3	74	0.544	229	219	4th, East	Lost 1st round
2014–15	68	27	34	-	3	4	61	0.449	248	275	6th, East	Lost 1st round
2015–16	68	33	28	-	3	4	73	0.537	246	249	4th, East	Lost 1st round
2016–17	68	35	25	-	6	2	78	0.574	230	231	3rd, East	Lost 1st round
2017–18	68	42	20	-	4	2	90	0.662	270	195	2nd, East	Lost 3rd round
2018–19	68	30	33	-	4	1	65	0.478	188	219	3rd, Central	Lost 2nd round
2019–20	63	26	28	-	5	4	61	0.484	190	201	3rd, Central	No playoffs
2020–21	26	16	9	-	1	0	33	0.635	99	65	3rd, East	President's Cup champion
2021–22	68	25	36	-	4	3	57	0.419	176	251	4th, Central	Out of Playoffs
2022–23	68	40	20	-	2	6	88	0.647	244	190	2nd, Central	Lost 1st round
2023–24	68	43	20	-	4	1	91	0.669	263	218	2nd, Central	Lost 3rd round
2024–25	64	17	43	-	1	3	38	0.297	166	315	4th, Central	Out of Playoffs
2025–26	64	23	36	-	5	0	51	0.398	200	269	7th, Western	Lost 1st round
