= 1996–97 QMJHL season =

1996-97 QMJHL season
- League: Quebec Major Junior Hockey League
- Sport: Hockey
- Duration: Regular season Sept. 20, 1996 – Mar. 14, 1997; Playoffs; March 17 – April 29, 1997
- Teams: 14

Draft
- Top draft pick: Jonathan Girard
- Picked by: Laval Titan Collège Français

Regular season
- Jean Rougeau Trophy: Hull Olympiques (3)
- Season MVP: Daniel Corso (Victoriaville Tigres)
- Top scorer: Pavel Rosa (Hull Olympiques)

Playoffs
- Playoffs MVP: Christian Bronsard (Olympiques)
- Finals champions: Hull Olympiques (3)
- Runners-up: Chicoutimi Saguenéens

QMJHL seasons
- 1995–96 1997–98

1996-97 CHL season
- League: Canadian Hockey League
- Sport: Hockey
- Duration: OHL; Sept. 1996 – Mar. 1997; QMJHL; Sept. 20, 1996 – Mar. 14, 1997; WHL; Sept. 1996 – Mar. 1997
- Teams: 60
- Season MVP: Alyn McCauley (Ottawa 67's) (OHL)
- Top scorer: Pavel Rosa (Hull Olympiques) (QMJHL)

Memorial Cup
- Finals champions: Hull Olympiques (QMHL) (2nd title)
- Runners-up: Lethbridge Hurricanes (WHL)

The 1996–97 QMJHL season was the 28th season in the history of the Quebec Major Junior Hockey League. The league continues explore new markets as the Saint-Hyacinthe Laser move north to Rouyn-Noranda, Quebec. The New Faces Cup is renamed the RDS Cup, for its new sponsor, Réseau des sports. Fourteen teams played 70 games each in the schedule. The Hull Olympiques finished first overall in the regular season winning their third Jean Rougeau Trophy, and won their fourth President's Cup, defeating the Chicoutimi Saguenéens in the finals.

== Team changes ==
- The Saint-Hyacinthe Laser relocated to Rouyn-Noranda, Quebec, becoming the Rouyn-Noranda Huskies.
- The Moncton Alpines are renamed the Moncton Wildcats.

== Final standings ==
Note: GP = Games played; W = Wins; L = Losses; T = Ties; Pts = Points; GF = Goals for; GA = Goals against

Dilio Division	GP	W	L	T	Pts	GF	GA
Victoriaville Tigres	70	43	23	4	90	293	216
Shawinigan Cataractes	70	41	24	5	87	277	232
Halifax Mooseheads	70	37	29	4	78	267	255
Chicoutimi Saguenéens	70	37	30	3	77	271	222
Rimouski Océanic	70	34	31	5	73	298	261
Beauport Harfangs	70	24	44	2	50	216	284
Moncton Wildcats	70	16	52	2	34	192	354

Lebel Division	GP	W	L	T	Pts	GF	GA
Hull Olympiques	70	48	19	3	99	346	205
Granby Prédateurs	70	44	20	6	94	304	210
Val-d'Or Foreurs	70	40	28	2	82	268	230
Drummondville Voltigeurs	70	36	33	1	73	305	287
Laval Titan Collège Français	70	27	40	3	57	260	314
Sherbrooke Faucons	70	24	45	1	49	206	283
Rouyn-Noranda Huskies	70	16	49	5	37	174	324

- complete list of standings.

== Scoring leaders ==
Note: GP = Games played; G = Goals; A = Assists; Pts = Points; PIM = Penalty minutes

Player	Team	GP	G	A	Pts	PIM
Pavel Rosa	Hull Olympiques	68	63	89	152	56
Martin Ménard	Hull Olympiques	60	59	82	141	57
Daniel Brière	Drummondville Voltigeurs	59	52	78	130	86
Martin Chouinard	Granby Prédateurs	69	41	83	124	126
Eric Normandin	Rimouski Océanic	65	47	75	122	236
Daniel Corso	Victoriaville Tigres	54	51	68	119	50
Éric Bélanger	Beauport/ Rimouski	62	39	78	107	66
Philippe Audet	Granby Prédateurs	67	52	56	108	150
Jean-Pierre Dumont	Val-d'Or Foreurs	62	44	64	108	88
Guy Loranger	Shawinigan Cataractes	70	44	62	106	101

- complete scoring statistics

== Leading goaltenders ==
Note: GP = Games played; TOI = Total ice time; W = Wins; L = Losses; GA = Goals against; SO = Total shutouts; SV% = Save percentage; GAA = Goals against average

Player	Team	GP	TOI	W	L	GA	SO	SV%	GAA
Marc Denis	Chicoutimi Saguenéens	41	2316	22	15	104	4	.905	2.69
Christian Bronsard	Hull Olympiques	43	2451	30	10	112	1	.908	2.74
Frédéric Henry	Granby Prédateurs	57	3327	33	16	161	4	.905	2.90
Mathieu Garon	Victoriaville Tigres	48	2808	33	11	148	6	.902	2.93
Sébastien Charpentier	Shawinigan Cataractes	62	3474	37	17	176	1	.899	3.04

== Playoffs ==
Division Quarterfinals	Division Semifinals
L1	Hull	4
L4	Drummondville	1
L4	Drummondville	3
L5	Laval	0
Lebel Division
L2	Granby	1
L3	Val-d'Or	4
L3	Val-d'Or	3
L6	Sherbrooke	0
D2	Shawinigan	3
D3	Halifax	4
D3	Halifax	3
D6	Beauport	1
D1	Victroiaville	2
D4	Chicoutimi	4
D4	Chicoutimi	3
D5	Rimouski	1

Division Finals
L1	Hull	4
L3	Val-d'Or	1
D3	Halifax	3
D4	Chicoutimi	4

League Finals
L1	Hull	4
D4	Chicoutimi	0

== Division Quarterfinals ==
=== Lebel Division ===
==== (L4) Drummondville Voltigeurs vs. (L5) Laval Titan Collège Français ====
March 17	Drummondville Voltigeurs	4 – 2	Laval Titan Collège Français	Centre Marcel Dionne
7:34 - Daniel Brière (1)		First period	No scoring
12:51- Gordie Dwyer (1); 17:55 - pp - Étienne Drapeau (1)		Second period	Jim Shepherd (1) - pp - 7:36; Martin Fillion (1) - pp - 9:24
19:28 - Gordie Dwyer (2)		Third period	No scoring
Pierre-Luc Therrien (42 saves / 44 shots)		Goalie stats	Jean-Sébastien Aubin (26 saves / 30 shots)

March 18	Laval Titan Collège Français	5 – 6	OT	Drummondville Voltigeurs	Centre Sportif
11:44 - pp - Martin Fillion (2); 18:48 - pp - Yannick Hubert (1)		First period		Étienne Drapeau (2) - 3:04; Daniel Brière (2) - 5:11
5:41 - pp - Dominic Perna (1); 7:49 - Dominic Perna (2)		Second period		Gordie Dwyer (3) - pp - 15:35
8:17 - Martin Fillion (3)		Third period		Gordie Dwyer (4) - 4:08; Frédérick Jobin (1) - pp - 15:36
No scoring		First overtime period		Philippe Plante (1) - 7:43
Jean-Sébastien Aubin (42 saves / 48 shots)		Goalie stats		Pierre-Luc Therrien (7 saves / 11 shots); Martin Bradette (19 saves / 20 shots)

March 20	Drummondville Voltigeurs	2 – 1	Laval Titan Collège Français	Centre Marcel Dionne
No scoring		First period	Jason Bermingham (1) - 16:12
No scoring		Second period	No scoring
5:38 - Daniel Brière (3); 6:42 - Norbert Roy (1)		Third period	No scoring
Martin Bradette (28 saves / 29 shots)		Goalie stats	Maxime Gingras (40 saves / 42 shots)

Drummondville won series 3 – 0

==== (L3) Val-d'Or Foreurs vs. (L6) Sherbrooke Faucons ====
March 17	Val-d'Or Foreurs	4 – 1	Sherbrooke Faucons	Palais des Sports
1:21 - Jean-Pierre Dumont (1); 6:06 - Lucio DeMartinis (1); 7:32 - Olexei Lazarenko (1)		First period	No scoring
2:26 - Jean-Pierre Dumont (2)		Second period	Samuel Lacroix (1) - 3:36
No scoring		Third period	No scoring
Roberto Luongo (27 saves / 28 shots)		Goalie stats	Frédérick Brind'Amour (29 saves / 33 shots)

March 18	Val-d'Or Foreurs	4 – 3	Sherbrooke Faucons	Palais des Sports
19:37 - pp - Daniel Bienvenue (1)		First period	Éric Pinoul (1) - 1:55; Steve Thériault (1) - 9:51; Jean-Nicolas Bordeleau (1) - pp - 15:50
No scoring		Second period	No scoring
0:55 - pp - Olexei Lazarenko (2); 1:47 - Dominic Chiasson (1); 3:22 - Jean-Luc Grand-Pierre (1)		Third period	No scoring
Roberto Luongo (17 saves / 20 shots)		Goalie stats	Frédérick Brind'Amour (37 saves / 41 shots)

March 20	Sherbrooke Faucons	2 – 8	Val-d'Or Foreurs	Palais des Sports Léopold-Drolet
9:05 - Sylvain Dufresne (1); 16:57 - pp - Sylvain Dufresne (2)		First period	François Archambault (1) - 10:13
No scoring		Second period	Olexei Lazarenko (3) - sh - 5:56; Jean-Pierre Dumont (3) - pp - 9:36; Dominic Chiasson (2) - 11:17
No scoring		Third period	Olexei Lazarenko (4) - pp - 4:41; Marc-Étienne Hubert (1) - sh - 8:12; Martin Lacaille (1) - pp - 12:41; Jonathan Gagnon (1) - 13:58
Frédérick Brind'Amour (22 saves / 30 shots); Claude Fernet (4 saves / 4 shots)		Goalie stats	Roberto Luongo (23 saves / 25 shots)

Val-d'Or won series 3 – 0

=== Dilio Division ===
==== (D3) Halifax Mooseheads vs. (D6) Beauport Harfangs ====
March 17	Halifax Mooseheads	3 – 9	Beauport Harfangs	Halifax Metro Centre
No scoring		First period	Sam Gagnon (1) - 6:35
9:49 - Jody Shelley (1)		Second period	Steve Simões (1) - 14:03; David Bernier (1) - pp - 15:16; Ramil Saïfoulline (1) - 15:59; Martin Moïse (1) - 18:33
4:00 - Jean-Simon Lemay (1); 17:13 - Alex Johnstone (1)		Third period	Patrick Savard (1) - pp - 1:41; Martin Moïse (2) - 7:57; Patrick Savard (2) - 8:11; Martin Moïse (3) - 16:21
Jean-Sébastien Giguère (11 saves / 19 shots); Martin Bilodeau (3 saves / 4 shots)		Goalie stats	Luc Vaillancourt (42 saves / 45 shots)

March 18	Halifax Mooseheads	7 – 4	Beauport Harfangs	Halifax Metro Centre
6:05 - Didier Tremblay (1); 10:48 - François Sasseville (1)		First period	No scoring
11:22 - pp - Elias Abrahamsson (1); 18:48 - Jamie Brown (1)		Second period	Patrick Savard (3) - 7:23; Mathieu Normandin (1) - 9:29
14:48 - Jason Troini (1); 15:44 - Marc Chouinard (1); 18:24 - en - François Sasseville (2)		Third period	Carlyle Lewis (1) - 3:33; Kurt Johnston (1) - 9:32
Jean-Sébastien Giguère (29 saves / 33 shots)		Goalie stats	Luc Vaillancourt (22 saves / 28 shots)

March 20	Beauport Harfangs	4 – 8	Halifax Mooseheads	Centre sportif Marcel-Bédard
16:58 - Martin Moïse (4)		First period	Jason Troini (2) - 7:48; Andrew Gilby (1) - 12:57; Alex Tanguay (1) - pp - 15:57
12:54 - David Bernier (2); 17:44 - Frédéric Levac (1)		Second period	François Sasseville (3) - 11:34
15:22 - Sam Gagnon (2)		Third period	Jason Troini (3) - 4:57 Alex Tanguay (2) - 6:54; Jamie Brown (2) - 12:45; François Sasseville (4) - sh - 18:01
Luc Vaillancourt (22 saves / 30 shots)		Goalie stats	Jean-Sébastien Giguère (33 saves / 37 shots)

March 21	Beauport Harfangs	2 – 3	Halifax Mooseheads	Centre sportif Marcel-Bédard
4:25 - Patrick Savard (4)		First period	Marc Chouinard (2) - pp - 4:25
No scoring		Second period	No scoring
10:12 - Mathieu Normandin (2)		Third period	1:08 - Martin Pouliot (1); 2:46 - Alexandre Mathieu (1)
Luc Vaillancourt (31 saves / 34 shots)		Goalie stats	Jean-Sébastien Giguère (33 saves / 35 shots)

Halifax won series 3 – 1

==== (D4) Chicoutimi Saguenéens vs. (D5) Rimouski Océanic ====
March 17	Chicoutimi Saguenéens	6 – 2	Rimouski Océanic	Centre Georges-Vézina
No scoring		First period	Vincent Lecavalier (1) - 8:29
3:27 - sh - David Gosselin (1); 4:44 - Frédéric Bouchard (1); 8:48 - Frédéric Bouchard (2); 18:39 - David Gosselin (2)		Second period	Éric Bélanger (1) - pp - 17:19
2:42 - Denis Hamel (1); 11:29 - Marc Bouchard (1)		Third period	No scoring
Marc Denis (18 saves / 20 shots)		Goalie stats	Nicolas Chabot (43 saves / 49 shots)

March 18	Rimouski Océanic	4 – 3	Chicoutimi Saguenéens	Colisée de Rimouski
Jonathan Beaulieu (1) - 5:46; Éric Normandin (1) - 13:34		First period	4:32 - sh - Denis Hamel (2); 8:53 - pp - Bruce Richardson (1)
Derrick Walser (1) - pp - 12:41; Éric Bélanger (2) - 16:33		Second period	No scoring
No scoring		Third period	7:00 - pp - Frédéric Bouchard (3)
Nicolas Chabot (32 saves / 35 shots)		Goalie stats	Marc Denis (28 saves / 32 shots)

March 20	Chicoutimi Saguenéens	9 – 5	Rimouski Océanic	Centre Georges-Vézina
Marc Bouchard (2) - pp - 10:46		First period	14:47 - Vincent Lecavalier (2)
David Gosselin (3) - pp - 2:55; David Gosselin (4) - 3:44		Second period
Pavel Smirnov (1) - 3:25; Sacha Fillion (1) - 4:10; David Gosselin (5) - pp - 5:56; Ramzi Abid (1) - 9:14; Frédéric Bouchard (4) - pp - 11:31; Olivier Morin (1) - pp - 19:15		Third period	2:56 - pp - Russell Smith (1); 7:40 - Martin Poitras (1); 14:03 - pp - Martin Poitras (2); 14:14 - Derrick Walser (2)
Marc Denis (25 saves / 30 shots)		Goalie stats	Nicolas Chabot (28 saves / 34 shots); Philippe Sauvé (13 saves / 16 shots)

March 21	Rimouski Océanic	4 – 7	Chicoutimi Saguenéens	Colisée de Rimouski
No scoring		First period	No scoring
3:31 - Mathieu Sunderland (1); 8:05 - Vincent Lecavalier (3); 9:26 - pp - Russell Smith (2)		Second period	Frédéric Bouchard (5) - pp - 14:34; Frédéric Bouchard (6) - pp - 14:43
7:00 - Vincent Lecavalier (4)		Third period	Bruce Richardson (2) - 12:00; Marc Bouchard (3) - 12:49; Patrick Gingras (1) - 13:58; David Gosselin (6) - en - 19:02
Nicolas Chabot (40 saves / 46 shots)		Goalie stats	Marc Denis (30 saves / 34 shots)

Chicoutimi won series 3 – 1

== Division Semifinals ==
=== Lebel Division ===
==== (L1) Hull Olympiques vs. (L4) Drummondville Voltigeurs ====
March 25	Hull Olympiques	10 – 3	Drummondville Voltigeurs	Centre Robert Guertin
10:25 - pp - Martin Ménard (1); 12:54 - Martin Ménard (2); 14:46 - Colin White (1); 15:24 - Colin White (2); 16:33 - Marty Johnston (1)		First period	No scoring
0:22 - pp - Pavel Rosa (1); 2:40 - Mario Larocque (1); 4:20 - Mario Larocque (2)		Second period	Philippe Plante (2) - pp - 4:45; Jasmin Gélinas (1) - 7:36
0:43 - Jonathan Delisle (1); 7:58 - Donald MacLean (1)		Third period	Ľuboš Bartečko (1) - 0:59
Martin Biron (30 saves / 33 shots)		Goalie stats	Martin Bradette (34 saves / 40 shots); Pierre-Luc Therrien (8 saves / 12 shots)

March 26	Drummondville Voltigeurs	2 – 8	Hull Olympiques	Centre Marcel-Dionne
No scoring		First period	10:46 - pp - Peter Worrell (1)
Gordie Dwyer (5) - 11:33		Second period	1:19 - sh - Christian Dubé (1); 7:51 - pp - Francis Bélanger (1); 17:27 - Pavel Rosa (2)
Karol Bartanus (1) - 1:35		Third period	6:30 - Donald MacLean (2); 13:38 - Donald MacLean (3); 15:06 - pp - Donald MacLean (4); 16:26 - Martin Ménard (3)
Martin Bradette (35 saves / 43 shots)		Goalie stats	Christian Bronsard (23 saves / 25 shots)

March 28	Hull Olympiques	5 – 6	Drummondville Voltigeurs	Centre Robert Guertin
Martin Ménard (4) - 19:03		First period	No scoring
Jonathan Delisle (2) - 5:11; Pavel Rosa (3) - 5:22; Donald MacLean (5) - pp - 11:45; Christian Dubé (2) - 18:33		Second period	0:58 - pp - Daniel Brière (4); 7:24 - Daniel Brière (5); 10:03 - pp - Daniel Brière (6); 14:59 - pp - Frédérick Jobin (2)
No scoring		Third period	9:54 - pp - Steve Tardif (1); 13:34 - Derrick Pyke (1)
Martin Biron (10 saves / 14 shots); Christian Bronsard (9 saves / 11 shots)		Goalie stats	Pierre-Luc Therrien (24 saves / 27 shots); Martin Bradette (27 saves / 29 shots)

March 30	Drummondville Voltigeurs	3 – 6	Hull Olympiques	Centre Marcel-Dionne
No scoring		First period	No scoring
No scoring		Second period	Martin Éthier (1) - 15:52; Christian Dubé (3) - 17:04; Martin Ménard (5) - pp - 19:56
5:58 - pp - Jean-Philippe Doyon (1); 6:23 - Gordie Dwyer (6); 19:20 - pp - Étienne Drapeau (3)		Third period	Christian Dubé (4) - 4:01; Jonathan Delisle (3) - 12:38; Jonathan Delisle (4) - 14:51
Martin Bradette (30 saves / 36 shots)		Goalie stats	Christian Bronsard (28 saves / 31 shots)

April 1	Hull Olympiques	9 – 1	Drummondville Voltigeurs	Centre Robert Guertin
0:20 - Éric Naud (1); 2:32 - Pavel Rosa (4); 3:13 - Donald MacLean (6); 7:41 - Colin White (3); 9:00 - sh - Christian Dubé (5); 15:57 - pp - Pavel Rosa (5)		First period	Daniel Brière (7) - pp - 10:22
7:54 - Donald MacLean (7)		Second period	No scoring
14:12 - Pavel Rosa (6); 17:58 - Jaret Sledz (1)		Third period	No scoring
Martin Biron (26 saves / 27 shots)		Goalie stats	Martin Bradette (14 saves / 20 shots); Pierre-Luc Therrien (16 saves / 19 shots)

Hull won series 4 – 1

==== (L2) Granby Prédateurs vs. (L3) Val-d'Or Foreurs ====
March 25	Granby Prédateurs	4 – 1	Val-d'Or Foreurs	Centre sportif Léonard-Grondin
16:47 - Christian Daigle (1)		First period	No scoring
13:18 - Daniel Payette (1)		Second period	No scoring
7:45 - Philippe Audet (1); 9:35 - Xavier Delisle (1)		Third period	Olexei Lazarenko (5) - 8:34
Frédéric Henry (20 saves / 21 shots)		Goalie stats	Roberto Luongo (35 saves / 39 shots)

March 26	Val-d'Or Foreurs	6 – 3	Granby Prédateurs	Palais des Sports
Dominic Chiasson (3) - pp - 11:01		First period	2:53 - pp - Daniel Payette (2); 17:25 - Jean-François Brunelle (1)
Jean-Luc Grand-Pierre (2) - 2:55		Second period	9:18 - pp - Yannick Dupont (1)
Daniel Bienvenue (2) - 2:46; Yanick Evola (1) - pp - 8:15; Daniel Bienvenue (3) - 9:42; Olexei Lazarenko (6) - 10:17		Third period	No scoring
Roberto Luongo (30 saves / 33 shots)		Goalie stats	Frédéric Henry (31 saves / 37 shots)

March 28	Granby Prédateurs	3 – 4	OT	Val-d'Or Foreurs	Centre sportif Léonard-Grondin
No scoring		First period		2:20 - Jean-Luc Grand-Pierre (3); 10:40 - Daniel Bienvenue (4)
Daniel Payette (3) - 5:51; Philippe Audet (2) - 18:50		Second period		No scoring
Samy Nasreddine (1) - pp - 5:41		Third period		7:39 - Jean-Pierre Dumont (4)
No scoring		First overtime period		2:44 - Jean-Pierre Dumont (5)
Frédéric Henry (19 saves / 23 shots)		Goalie stats		Roberto Luongo (36 saves / 39 shots)

March 30	Val-d'Or Foreurs	7 – 2	Granby Prédateurs	Palais des Sports
0:59 - Yanick Evola (2); 4:06 - pp - Dominic Chiasson (4); 9:01 - Jean-Luc Grand-Pierre (4); 9:45 - Lucio DeMartinis (2); 19:18 - pp - Jean-Pierre Dumont (6)		First period	Philippe Audet (3) - pp - 15:52
13:47 - pp - Jean-Pierre Dumont (7); 15:10 - pp - Jean-Pierre Dumont (8)		Second period	Philippe Audet (4) - 3:22
No scoring		Third period	No scoring
Roberto Luongo (38 saves / 40 shots); Patrick Couture (0 saves / 0 shots)		Goalie stats	Frédéric Henry (25 saves / 31 shots); Francis Larivée (0 saves / 1 shot)

April 1	Granby Prédateurs	2 – 3	Val-d'Or Foreurs	Centre sportif Léonard-Grondin
2:56 - Christian Daigle (2)		First period	Dominic Chiasson (5) - sh - 8:56
6:54 - pp - Yannick Dupont (2)		Second period	No scoring
No scoring		Third period	Yanick Evola (3) - 3:44; Yanick Evola (4) - pp - 11:51
Frédéric Henry (20 saves / 23 shots)		Goalie stats	Roberto Luongo (31 saves / 33 shots)

Val-d'Or won series 4 – 1

=== Dilio Division ===
==== (D1) Victoriaville Tigres vs. (D4) Chicoutimi Saguenéens ====
March 25	Victoriaville Tigres	2 – 3	Chicoutimi Saguenéens	Colisée des Bois-Francs
No scoring		First period	Denis Hamel (3) - sh - 19:59
3:32 - Christian Robichaud (1); 13:25 - pp - Patrick Grandmaître (1)		Second period	Frédéric Bouchard (8) - pp - 4:54
No scoring		Third period	Frédéric Bouchard (9) - 7:47
Mathieu Garon (28 saves / 31 shots)		Goalie stats	Marc Denis (25 saves / 27 shots)

March 26	Chicoutimi Saguenéens	3 – 5	Victoriaville Tigres	Centre Georges-Vézina
Frédéric Bouchard (10) - 8:42		First period	15:11 - Emmanuel Labranche (1)
Denis Hamel (4) - 6:15		Second period	5:12 - Christian Robichaud (2); 9:03 - sh - David Thibeault (1); 12:28 - Michel Massie (1)
Radoslav Suchý (1) - 14:51		Third period	9:35 - pp - Carl Paradis (1)
Marc Denis (19 saves / 24 shots)		Goalie stats	Mathieu Garon (57 saves / 60 shots)

March 28	Victoriaville Tigres	2 – 7	Chicoutimi Saguenéens	Colisée des Bois-Francs
David Thibeault (2) - pp - 8:36; Christian Robichaud (3) - 10:28		First period	12:47 - pp - Sébastien Bêty (1); 17:50 - pp - Radoslav Suchý (2)
No scoring		Second period	4:57 - Sacha Fillion (2); 7:34 - Sébastien Bêty (2); 17:52 - Denis Hamel (5)
No scoring		Third period	0:30 - pp - Frédéric Bouchard (11); 15:11 - pp - Olivier Morin (2)
Mathieu Garon (23 saves / 29 shots); Jonathan Pelletier (12 saves / 13 shots)		Goalie stats	Marc Denis (26 saves / 28 shots); Rémi Bergeron (1 save / 1 shot)

March 30	Chicoutimi Saguenéens	3 – 2	OT	Victoriaville Tigres	Centre Georges-Vézina
10:29 - sh - Denis Hamel (6); 13:39 - sh - David Gosselin (7)		First period		Michel Massie (2) - pp - 7:45
No scoring		Second period		No scoring
No scoring		Third period		David Thibeault (3) - pp - 12:34
1:08 - Denis Hamel (7)		First overtime period		No scoring
Marc Denis (25 saves / 27 shots)		Goalie stats		Mathieu Garon (38 saves / 41 shots)

April 1	Chicoutimi Saguenéens	1 – 4	Victoriaville Tigres	Centre Georges-Vézina
No scoring		First period	No scoring
Radoslav Suchý (3) - pp - 8:25		Second period	7:07 - François Pagé (1); 15:26 - pp - Michel Massie (3); 15:50 - François Cloutier (1)
No scoring		Third period	18:23 - sh - en - Patrick Grandmaître (2)
Marc Denis (22 saves / 25 shots)		Goalie stats	Mathieu Garon (36 saves / 37 shots)

April 4	Chicoutimi Saguenéens	7 – 0	Victoriaville Tigres	Centre Georges-Vézina
2:34 - pp - Denis Hamel (8); 14:56 - Radoslav Suchý (4)		First period	No scoring
1:12 - Frédéric Bouchard (12); 19:07 - pp - Marc Bouchard (4)		Second period	No scoring
5:34 - Patrick Gingras (2); 5:51 - Radoslav Suchý (5); 8:55 - Bruce Richardson (3)		Third period	No scoring
Marc Denis (19 saves / 19 shots)		Goalie stats	Mathieu Garon (33 saves / 40 shots); Jonathan Pelletier (3 saves / 3 shots)

Chicoutimi won series 4 – 2

==== (D2) Shawinigan Cataractes vs. (D3) Halifax Mooseheads ====
March 25	Shawinigan Cataractes	7 – 5	Halifax Mooseheads	Aréna Jacques Plante
8:37 - pp - Guy Loranger (1); 17:56 - David Beauregard (1)		First period	Jody Shelley (2) - pp - 11:10
15:27 - pp - Stéphane Robidas (1)		Second period	Alex Tanguay (3) - 5:12; Marc Chouinard (3) - 10:49
6:29 - Sylvain Rodier (1); 16:19 - Stéphane Robidas (2); 16:52 - David Beauregard (2); 19:15 - en - Sylvain Rodier (2)		Third period	Martin Pouliot (2) - pp - 1:06; Jamie Brown (3) - 2:11
Sébastien Charpentier (16 saves / 21 shots)		Goalie stats	Jean-Sébastien Giguère (43 saves / 49 shots)

March 26	Shawinigan Cataractes	1 – 3	Halifax Mooseheads	Aréna Jacques Plante
4:36 - pp - Guy Loranger (2)		First period	No scoring
No scoring		Second period	No scoring
No scoring		Third period	Alex Tanguay (4) - 3:23; Todd Row (1) - sh - 14:20; Marc Chouinard (4) - en - 19:37
Sébastien Charpentier (26 saves / 28 shots)		Goalie stats	Jean-Sébastien Giguère (34 saves / 35 shots)

March 28	Halifax Mooseheads	5 – 6	OT	Shawinigan Cataractes	Halifax Metro Centre
5:48 - Jamie Brown (4)		First period		Sylvain Rodier (3) - 0:40; Roberto Baldris (1) - 1:40; Stéphane Robidas (3) - pp - 10:33
3:48 - Marc Chouinard (5); 18:58 - Éric Laplante (1)		Second period		Sylvain Rodier (4) - 11:27; Guy Loranger (3) - 15:22
2:09 - Jason Troini (4); 12:19 - Andrew Gilby (2)		Third period		No scoring
No scoring		First overtime period		Alexandre Jacques (1) - 3:31
Jean-Sébastien Giguère (25 saves / 31 shots)		Goalie stats		Sébastien Charpentier (35 saves / 40 shots)

March 29	Halifax Mooseheads	5 – 4	2OT	Shawinigan Cataractes	Halifax Metro Centre
8:37 - pp - Jamie Brown (5); 14:43 - Jamie Brown (6)		First period		Guy Loranger (4) - pp - 3:35
15:25 - pp - Jamie Brown (7)		Second period		Guy Loranger (5) - pp - 6:30
8:53 - Marc Chouinard (6)		Third period		Peter Šlamiar (1) - 9:25; Jean-Philippe Paré (1) - 19:49
17:31 - Jamie Brown (8)		Second overtime period		No scoring
Jean-Sébastien Giguère (41 saves / 45 shots)		Goalie stats		Sébastien Charpentier (5 saves / 6 shots); Mathieu Chouinard (36 saves / 40 shots)

March 31	Shawinigan Cataractes	4 – 3	Halifax Mooseheads	Aréna Jacques Plante
No scoring		First period	Martin Pouliot (3) - 4:38
18:53 - pp - Alexandre Jacques (2)		Second period	No scoring
9:19 - pp - Stéphane Robidas (4); 10:16 - Jean-Philippe Paré (2); 17:51 - David Bahl (1)		Third period	Jody Shelley (3) - pp - 0:21; François Sasseville (5) - pp - 1:37
Mathieu Chouinard (14 saves / 17 shots)		Goalie stats	Jean-Sébastien Giguère (42 saves / 46 shots)

April 2	Halifax Mooseheads	4 – 2	Shawinigan Cataractes	Halifax Metro Centre
13:48 - François Sasseville (6)		First period	Alexandre Jacques (3) - 0:12; François Méthot (1) - pp - 9:16
9:16 - pp - Jamie Brown (9)		Second period	No scoring
3:44 - Jody Shelley (4); 5:44 - Marc Chouinard (7)		Third period	No scoring
Jean-Sébastien Giguère (33 saves / 35 shots)		Goalie stats	Mathieu Chouinard (35 saves / 39 shots)

April 5	Shawinigan Cataractes	3 – 5	Halifax Mooseheads	Aréna Jacques Plante
No scoring		First period	Jean-Simon Lemay (2) - 8:05; Jean-Simon Lemay (3) - 14:38
12:54 - David-Alexandre Beauregard (3)		Second period	Jamie Brown (10) - 8:42; François Sasseville (7) - pp - 15:23
6:07 - Jean-Philippe Paré (3); 8:53 - pp - François Méthot (2)		Third period	Todd Row (2) - en - 19:47
Mathieu Chouinard (20 saves / 24 shots)		Goalie stats	Jean-Sébastien Giguère (52 saves / 55 shots)

Halifax won series 4 – 3

== Division Finals ==
=== Lebel Division ===
==== (L1) Hull Olympiques vs. (L3) Val-d'Or Foreurs ====
April 8	Hull Olympiques	4 – 2	Val-d'Or Foreurs	Centre Robert Guertin
4:04 - pp - Pavel Rosa (7); 15:25 - Martin Ménard (6); 15:40 - Jonathan Delisle (5)		First period	Jean-Luc Grand-Pierre (5) - pp - 0:59; Marc-Étienne Hubert (2) - 10:50
No scoring		Second period	No scoring
6:30 - Martin Éthier (2)		Third period	No scoring
Martin Biron (18 saves / 20 shots)		Goalie stats	Roberto Luongo (34 saves / 38 shots)

April 9	Val-d'Or Foreurs	2 – 6	Hull Olympiques	Palais des Sports
Olexei Lazarenko (7) - 17:27		First period	8:28 - pp - Christian Dubé (6); 15:43 - Éric Naud (2)
Martin Lacaille (2) - pp - 13:28		Second period	8:22 - Pavel Rosa (8)
No scoring		Third period	8:02 - Jonathan Delisle (6); 18:19 - pp - Pavel Rosa (9); 19:51 - Francis Bélanger (2)
Roberto Luongo (32 saves / 38 shots)		Goalie stats	Christian Bronsard (17 saves / 19 shots)

April 11	Hull Olympiques	6 – 1	Val-d'Or Foreurs	Centre Robert Guertin
Martin Ménard (7) - pp - 8:22; Martin Ménard (8) - 16:24; Francis Nault (1) - 18:19		First period	No scoring
Steven Low (1) - 8:35; Pavel Rosa (10) - pp - 18:08		Second period	No scoring
Francis Nault (2) - 13:58		Third period	10:05 - Jean-Pierre Dumont (9)
Christian Bronsard (21 saves / 22 shots)		Goalie stats	Roberto Luongo (31 saves / 36 shots); Patrick Couture (11 saves / 12 shots)

April 13	Val-d'Or Foreurs	5 – 4	OT	Hull Olympiques	Palais des Sports
19:59 - Yanick Evola (5)		First period		Pavel Rosa (11) - 11:48
2:55 - pp - Daniel Bienvenue (5); 8:35 - pp - Jonathan Fauteux (1)		Second period		Martin Ménard (9) - pp - 6:38; Martin Ménard (10) - 9:13
14:10 - Lucio DeMartinis (3)		Third period		Steven Low (2) - pp - 16:38
14:24 - François Hardy (1)		First overtime period		No scoring
Roberto Luongo (45 saves / 49 shots)		Goalie stats		Martin Biron (24 saves / 29 shots)

April 15	Hull Olympiques	5 – 2	Val-d'Or Foreurs	Centre Robert Guertin
2:20 - Donald MacLean (8); 15:58 - pp - Jonathan Delisle (7)		First period	No scoring
6:56 - Pavel Rosa (12); 9:55 - Marty Johnston (2)		Second period	Lee Cousineau (1) - 10:50
13:26 - Pavel Rosa (13)		Third period	Daniel Bienvenue (6) - pp - 4:09
Christian Bronsard (23 saves / 25 shots)		Goalie stats	Roberto Luongo (37 saves / 42 shots)

Hull won series 4 – 1

=== Dilio Division ===
==== (D3) Halifax Mooseheads vs. (D4) Chicoutimi Saguenéens ====
April 7	Halifax Mooseheads	3 – 4	OT	Chicoutimi Saguenéens	Halifax Metro Centre
3:59 - Alexandre Mathieu (2)		First period		Patrick Gingras (3) - 5:34; Frédéric Bouchard (13) - pp - 18:12
8:34 - François Sasseville (8); 18:36 - Elias Abrahamsson (2)		Second period		No scoring
No scoring		Third period		Denis Hamel (9) - 13:07
No scoring		First overtime period		Marc Bouchard (5) - 3:26
Jean-Sébastien Giguère (36 saves / 40 shots)		Goalie stats		Marc Denis (29 saves / 32 shots)

April 8	Halifax Mooseheads	3 – 2	Chicoutimi Saguenéens	Halifax Metro Centre
2:18 - pp - Marc Chouinard (8)		First period	No scoring
6:47 - Éric Laplante (2); 13:39 - pp - Jody Shelley (5)		Second period	Frédéric Bouchard (14) - 11:24
No scoring		Third period	Olivier Morin (3) - 7:41
Jean-Sébastien Giguère (33 saves / 35 shots)		Goalie stats	Marc Denis (24 saves / 27 shots)

April 11	Chicoutimi Saguenéens	5 – 3	Halifax Mooseheads	Centre Georges-Vézina
5:14 - pp - Bruce Richardson (4); 12:53 - Patrick Gingras (4)		First period	Todd Row (3) - 10:06
16:58 - pp - Frédéric Bouchard (15)		Second period	Jody Shelley (6) - pp - 19:31
7:39 - Denis Hamel (10); 19:19 - sh - en - Sacha Fillion (3)		Third period	Marc Chouinard (9) - sh - 12:12
Marc Denis (22 saves / 25 shots)		Goalie stats	Jean-Sébastien Giguère (31 saves / 35 shots)

April 13	Chicoutimi Saguenéens	1 – 4	Halifax Mooseheads	Centre Georges-Vézina
No scoring		First period	Marc Chouinard (10) - sh - 11:01
No scoring		Second period	Elias Abrahamsson (3) - pp - 4:21
13:24 - pp - Frédéric Bouchard (16)		Third period	Jason Troini (5) - pp - 16:23; Todd Row (4) - en - 18:06
Marc Denis (14 saves / 17 shots)		Goalie stats	Jean-Sébastien Giguère (31 saves / 31 shots); Martin Bilodeau (16 saves / 17 shots)

April 15	Halifax Mooseheads	5 – 3	Chicoutimi Saguenéens	Halifax Metro Centre
No scoring		First period	Radoslav Suchý (6) - pp - 6:52
7:33 - Jamie Brown (11); 8:16 - François Sasseville (9); 18:25 - Éric Laplante (3)		Second period	Frédéric Bouchard (17) - 2:57; Olivier Morin (4) - 17:40
15:48 - Elias Abrahamsson (4); 19:37 - sh - en - François Sasseville (10)		Third period	No scoring
Martin Bilodeau (29 saves / 32 shots)		Goalie stats	Marc Denis (36 saves / 40 shots)

April 18	Chicoutimi Saguenéens	9 – 2	Halifax Mooseheads	Centre Georges-Vézina
2:54 - pp - Denis Hamel (11); 14:01 - pp - Marc Bouchard (6); 14:59 - Mathieu Benoît (1)		First period	No scoring
1:53 - pp - Frédéric Bouchard (18); 4:39 - Patrick Gingras (5)		Second period	Jamie Brown (12) - sh - 19:41
1:10 - pp - Denis Hamel (12); 2:40 - Bruce Richardson (5); 3:12 - pp - Olivier Morin (5); 19:08 - pp - Patrick Gingras (6)		Third period	Jason Troini (6) - 17:54
Marc Denis (13 saves / 14 shots); Rémi Bergeron (7 saves / 8 shots)		Goalie stats	Martin Bilodeau (23 saves / 28 shots); Steve Mongrain (30 saves / 34 shots)

April 20	Halifax Mooseheads	1 – 5	Chicoutimi Saguenéens	Halifax Metro Centre
No scoring		First period	Marc Bouchard (7) - 4:05
15:03 - Andrew Gilby (3)		Second period	Sébastien Bêty (3) - 2:43; Bruce Richardson (6) - 8:41; Frédéric Bouchard (19) - 15:24
No scoring		Third period	Denis Hamel (13) - 13:34
Jean-Sébastien Giguère (11 saves / 15 shots); Martin Bilodeau (14 saves / 15 shots)		Goalie stats	Marc Denis (28 saves / 29 shots)

Chicoutimi won series 4 – 3

== President's Cup Finals ==
=== (L1) Hull Olympiques vs. (D4) Chicoutimi Saguenéens ===
April 22	Hull Olympiques	8 – 3	Chicoutimi Saguenéens	Centre Robert Guertin
7:08 - pp - Christian Dubé (7)		First period	Bruce Richardson (7) - 1:19
3:12 - Éric Hunter (1); 7:42 - Jonathan Delisle (8); 14:22 - Ryan Lauzon (1); 16:29 - Matthieu Descoteaux (1)		Second period	Ramzi Abid (2) - 6:02
4:51 - pp - Jonathan Delisle (9); 6:45 - pp - Martin Ménard (11); 11:02 - Marty Johnston (3)		Third period	Denis Hamel (14) - pp - 9:25
Christian Bronsard (33 saves / 36 shots)		Goalie stats	Marc Denis (17 saves / 24 shots); Rémi Bergeron (7 saves / 8 shots)

April 25	Chicoutimi Saguenéens	3 – 4	Hull Olympiques	Centre Georges-Vézina
Patrick Gingras (7) - 19:19		First period	17:01 - pp - Donald MacLean (9)
No scoring		Second period	2:16 - pp - Steven Low (3); 2:56 - Donald MacLean (10); 13:30 - Jonathan Delisle (10)
Mathieu Benoît (2) - pp - 1:12; Frédéric Bouchard (20) - 14:34		Third period	No scoring
Marc Denis (38 saves / 42 shots)		Goalie stats	Christian Bronsard (24 saves / 27 shots)

April 27	Hull Olympiques	6 – 2	Chicoutimi Saguenéens	Centre Robert Guertin
Pavel Rosa (14) - 5:37		First period	No scoring
Pavel Rosa (15) - 3:02; Donald MacLean (11) - 4:10; Pavel Rosa (16) - 19:18		Second period	9:50 - Marc Bouchard (8)
Martin Ménard (12) - 4:40; Jonathan Delisle (11) - 10:32		Third period	0:57 - Frédéric Bouchard (21)
Christian Bronsard (40 saves / 42 shots)		Goalie stats	Marc Denis (28 saves / 34 shots)

April 29	Chicoutimi Saguenéens	5 – 6	Hull Olympiques	Centre Georges-Vézina
17:17 - Patrick Gingras (8)		First period	Peter Worrell (2) - pp - 6:42; Peter Worrell (3) - 7:08; Pavel Rosa (17) - 11:53
4:10 - David Gosselin (8); 13:26 - pp - Frédéric Bouchard (22); 16:34 - David Gosselin (9)		Second period	Éric Naud (3) - 11:11
8:03 - Denis Hamel (15)		Third period	Éric Naud (4) - 11:03; Pavel Rosa (18) - 19:55
Marc Denis (40 saves / 46 shots)		Goalie stats	Martin Biron (20 saves / 24 shots); Christian Bronsard (11 saves / 12 shots)

Hull won series 4 – 0

== Playoff scoring leaders ==
Note: GP = Games played; G = Goals; A = Assists; Pts = Points; PIM = Penalty minutes

Player	Team	GP	G	A	Pts	PIM
Frédéric Bouchard	Chicoutimi Saguenéens	21	22	29	51	42
Martin Ménard	Hull Olympiques	14	12	23	35	17
Pavel Rosa	Hull Olympiques	14	18	13	31	16
Martin Chouinard	Halifax Mooseheads	18	10	16	26	12
Marc Bouchard	Chicoutimi Saguenéens	21	8	18	28	14
Denis Hamel	Chicoutimi Saguenéens	20	15	10	25	65
Jonathan Delisle	Hull Olympiques	14	11	13	24	48
Jamie Brown	Halifax Mooseheads	18	12	11	23	39
François Sasseville	Halifax Mooseheads	18	10	13	23	16
Christian Dubé	Hull Olympiques	14	7	16	23	14

== Playoff leading goaltenders ==
Note: GP = Games played; TOI = Total ice time; W = Wins; L = Losses; GA = Goals against; SO = Total shutouts; SV% = Save percentage; GAA = Goals against average

Player	Team	GP	TOI	W	L	GA	SO	SV%	GAA
Christian Bronsard	Hull Olympiques	10	528	9	1	21	0	.916	2.38
Roberto Luongo	Val-d'Or Foreurs	13	776	8	5	44	0	.904	3.40
Mathieu Chouinard	Shawinigan Cataractes	4	263	1	3	15	0	.875	3.41
Marc Denis	Chicoutimi Saguenéens	21	1226	11	10	70	1	.883	3.43
Martin Biron	Hull Olympiques	6	325	3	1	19	0	.871	3.50

== All-star teams ==
First team

- Goaltender - Marc Denis, Chicoutimi Saguenéens
- Left defence - Derrick Walser, Beauport Harfangs / Rimouski Océanic
- Right defence - Stéphane Robidas, Shawinigan Cataractes
- Left winger - Philippe Audet, Granby Prédateurs
- Centreman - Daniel Corso, Victoriaville Tigres
- Right winger - Pavel Rosa, Hull Olympiques
- Coach - Clément Jodoin, Halifax Mooseheads

Second team

- Goaltender - Jean-Sébastien Giguère, Halifax Mooseheads
- Left defence - Radoslav Suchý, Sherbrooke Faucons / Chicoutimi Saguenéens
- Right defence - Frédéric Bouchard, Rouyn-Noranda Huskies / Chicoutimi Saguenéens
- Left winger - Jean-Pierre Dumont, Val-d'Or Foreurs
- Centreman - Daniel Brière, Drummondville Voltigeurs
- Right winger - Eric Normandin, Rimouski Océanic
- Coach - Alain Rajotte, Victoriaville Tigres

Rookie team

- Goaltender - Christian Bronsard, Hull Olympiques
- Left defence - François Beauchemin, Laval Titan Collège Français & Jeffrey Sullivan, Granby Prédateurs / Halifax Mooseheads
- Right defence - Jonathan Girard, Laval Titan Collège Français
- Left winger - Alex Tanguay, Halifax Mooseheads
- Centreman - Vincent Lecavalier, Rimouski Océanic
- Right winger - Gregor Baumgartner, Laval Titan Collège Français
- Coach - Denis Francoeur, Shawinigan Cataractes
- List of First/Second/Rookie team all-stars.

== Trophies and awards ==
Team

- President's Cup - Playoff Champions, Hull Olympiques
- Jean Rougeau Trophy - Regular Season Champions, Hull Olympiques
- Robert Lebel Trophy - Team with best GAA, Hull Olympiques

Player

- Michel Brière Memorial Trophy - Most Valuable Player, Daniel Corso, Victoriaville Tigres
- Jean Béliveau Trophy - Top Scorer, Pavel Rosa, Hull Olympiques
- Guy Lafleur Trophy - Playoff MVP, Christian Bronsard, Hull Olympiques
- Ford Cup – Offensive - Offensive Player of the Year, Pavel Rosa, Hull Olympiques
- Ford Cup – Defensive - Defensive Player of the Year, Jean-Sébastien Giguère, Halifax Mooseheads
- AutoPro Plaque - Best plus/minus total, Pavel Rosa, Hull Olympiques
- Jacques Plante Memorial Trophy - Best GAA, Marc Denis, Chicoutimi Saguenéens
- Emile Bouchard Trophy - Defenceman of the Year, Stéphane Robidas, Shawinigan Cataractes
- Mike Bossy Trophy - Best Pro Prospect, Roberto Luongo, Val-d'Or Foreurs
- RDS Cup - Rookie of the Year, Vincent Lecavalier, Rimouski Océanic
- Michel Bergeron Trophy - Offensive Rookie of the Year, Vincent Lecavalier, Rimouski Océanic
- Raymond Lagacé Trophy - Defensive Rookie of the Year, Christian Bronsard, Hull Olympiques
- Frank J. Selke Memorial Trophy - Most sportsmanlike player, Daniel Brière, Drummondville Voltigeurs
- QMJHL Humanitarian of the Year - Humanitarian of the Year, Jason Groleau, Victoriaville Tigres
- Marcel Robert Trophy - Best Scholastic Player, Luc Vaillancourt, Beauport Harfangs

Executive

- Ron Lapointe Trophy - Coach of the Year, Clément Jodoin, Halifax Mooseheads
- John Horman Trophy - Executive of the Year, Harold MacKay, Halifax Mooseheads
- St-Clair Group Plaque - Marketing Director of the Year, Matt McKnight, Halifax Mooseheads
- Paul Dumont Trophy - Personality of the Year, Michel Therrien, Granby Prédateurs

== See also ==
- 1997 Memorial Cup
- 1997 NHL entry draft
- 1996–97 OHL season
- 1996–97 WHL season

Preceded by 1995–96 QMJHL season	QMJHL seasons	Succeeded by 1997–98 QMJHL season
