= Sébastien Charpentier =

Sébastien Charpentier may refer to:

- Sébastien Charpentier (motorcycle racer) (born 1973), French motorcycle road racer
- Sébastien Charpentier (ice hockey) (born 1977), Canadian ice hockey goaltender
