= 1997 Memorial Cup =

Canadian junior men's ice hockey championship

1997 Chrysler Memorial Cup
Tournament details
- Venue(s): Robert Guertin Centre; Hull, Quebec
- Dates: May 10–18, 1997
- Teams: 4
- Host team: Hull Olympiques (QMJHL)
- TV partner: TSN

Final positions
- Champions: Hull Olympiques (QMJHL) (1st title)
- Runners-up: Lethbridge Hurricanes (WHL)

Tournament statistics
- Games played: 8
- Scoring leader: Christian Dubé (Olympiques) (13 points)

Awards
- MVP: Christian Dubé (Olympiques)

The Memorial Cup trophy

The 1997 Memorial Cup occurred May 10–18 at the Robert Guertin Centre in Hull, Quebec. It was the 79th annual Memorial Cup competition and determined the major junior ice hockey champion of the Canadian Hockey League (CHL). Participating teams were the host Hull Olympiques, who were also the champions of the Quebec Major Junior Hockey League, as well as the QMJHL runner-up Chicoutimi Saguenéens, and the winners of the Ontario Hockey League and Western Hockey League, which were the Oshawa Generals and the Lethbridge Hurricanes respectively. The round-robin portion of the tournament also featured one of the greatest games in Memorial Cup history, in which Lethbridge trailed Hull 6–1 to start the third period of their game and stormed back to win 7–6 in overtime. The Olympiques won their first Memorial Cup, over Lethbridge.

== Round-robin standings ==
Pos	Team	Pld	W	L	GF	GA
1	Hull Olympiques (QMJHL and host)	3	2	1	22	12
1	Lethbridge Hurricanes (WHL)	3	2	1	12	10
1	Oshawa Generals (OHL)	3	2	1	7	12
4	Chicoutimi Saguenéens (QMJHL rep.)	3	0	3	10	17

== Scores ==
Round-robin

- May 10 – Oshawa – 5, Chicoutimi – 3
- May 11 – Lethbridge – 4, Chicoutimi – 2
- May 11 – Hull – 8, Oshawa – 0
- May 13 – Lethbridge – 7, Hull – 6; (OT)
- May 14 – Oshawa – 2, Lethbridge – 1
- May 15 – Hull – 8, Chicoutimi – 5

Semi-final

- May 17 – Lethbridge – 5, Oshawa – 4; (OT)

Final

- May 18 – Hull – 5, Lethbridge – 1

=== Winning roster ===
1996-97 Hull Olympiques
Goaltenders: 29 – Martin Biron; 30 – Christian Bronsard	Defencemen: 4 – Kevin Brochu; 7 – Mario Larocque; 12 – Steven Low; 21 – Martin Ethier; 22 – Jaret Sledz; 24 – Colin White	Wingers: 9 – Martin Johnston; 11 – Eric Naud; 14 – Francis Belanger; 17 – Alexandre Audet; 18 – Francis Nault; 20 – Alexandre Couture; 27 – Jonathan Delisle; 28 – Peter Worrell; 35 – Matthieu Descoteaux; 55 – Pavel Rosa	Centres: 10 – Donald MacLean; 23 – Eric Hunter; 25 – Martin Menard; 26 – Ryan Lauzon; 96 – Christian Dube; Coach: Claude Julien; General Manager: Charles Henry

== Scoring leaders ==
1. Christian Dube – 6-7-13 (HUL)
2. Donald MacLean – 2-6-8 (HUL)
3. Pavel Rosa – 3-4-7 (HUL)
4. Martin Menard – 5-1-6 (HUL)
5. Frederic Bouchard – 2-4-6 (CHI)
6. David Gosselin – 3-2-5 (CHI)
7. Denis Hamel – 2-3-5 (CHI)
8. Mike Josephson – 2-3-5 (LET)
9. Marc Savard – 0-5-5 (OSH)
10. Jonathan Delisle – 0-5-5 (HUL)
11. Byron Ritchie – 2-2-4 (LET)

== Goaltending leaders ==
Statistics to be added

== Award winners ==
- Stafford Smythe Memorial Trophy (MVP): Christian Dube, Hull
- George Parsons Trophy (Sportsmanship): Radoslav Suchy, Chicoutimi
- Hap Emms Memorial Trophy (Goaltender): Christian Bronsard, Hull
- Ed Chynoweth Trophy (Top Scorer): Christian Dube, Hull

All-star team

- Goaltender: Christian Bronsard, Hull
- Defence: Chris Phillips, Lethbridge; Jan Snopek, Oshawa
- Forward: Christian Dube, Hull; Martin Menard, Hull; Byron Ritchie, Lethbridge
