= Radoslav Suchý =

Slovak ice hockey player

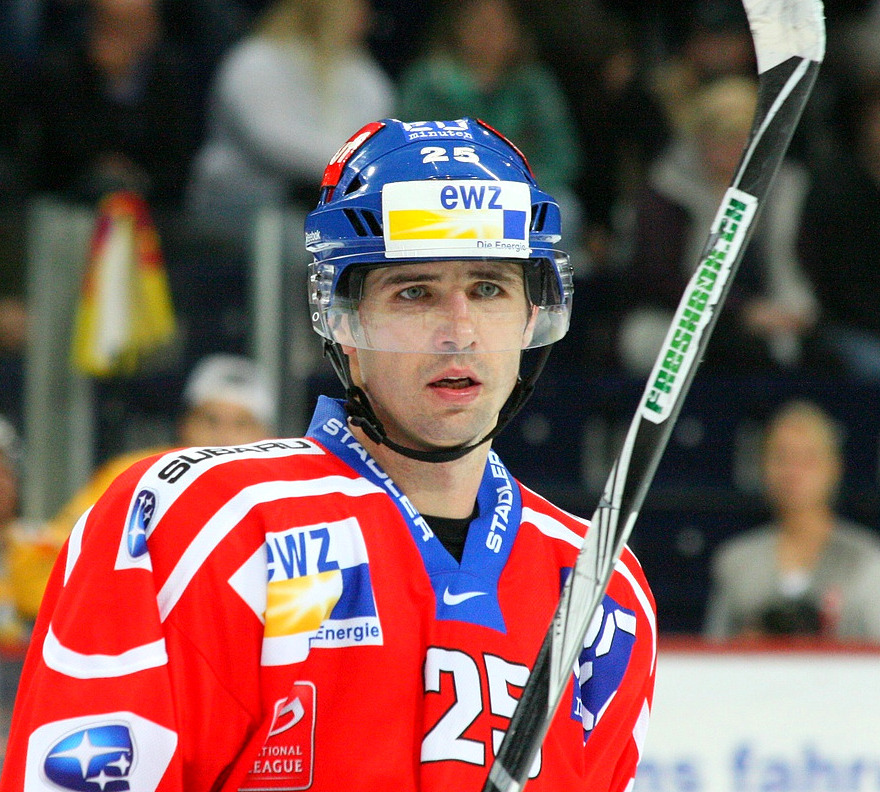
- Radoslav Suchý in 2009 with ZSC Lions
- Born: April 7, 1976 (age 48); Kežmarok, Czechoslovakia
- Height: 6 ft 2 in (188 cm)
- Weight: 204 lb (93 kg; 14 st 8 lb)
- Position: Defence
- Shot: Left
- Played for: HK ŠKP Poprad; Phoenix Coyotes; Columbus Blue Jackets; ZSC Lions; Avangard Omsk
- National team: Slovakia
- NHL draft: Undrafted
- Playing career: 1997–2019

Radoslav Suchý (born April 7, 1976) is a Slovak former professional ice hockey defenceman who played six seasons in the National Hockey League (NHL) with the Phoenix Coyotes and Columbus Blue Jackets

== Playing career ==
Undrafted, Suchý played in the Quebec Major Junior Hockey League (QMJHL) with the Sherbrooke Faucons and the Chicoutimi Saguenéens. Suchý was then signed by the Phoenix Coyotes on September 26, 1997, and made his professional debut in the 1997–98 season with the Las Vegas Thunder of the International Hockey League (IHL) and the Coyotes' then affiliate, the Springfield Falcons of the American Hockey League (AHL).

Suchý made his NHL debut with the Coyotes in the 1999–2000 season. He played four seasons for the Coyotes before he was traded (along with a sixth-round draft pick) to the Columbus Blue Jackets in exchange for a fourth-round pick. Suchý spent the 2004–05 NHL lockout with HK Aquacity ŠKP Poprad in the Slovak Extraliga.

In the 2005–06 season, Suchý played his only season with the Blue Jackets before leaving at season's end to sign with ZSC Lions of the Swiss National League A (NLA) for the start of the 2006–07 season.

On 31 August 2011, Suchý signed a one-year deal with Avangard Omsk of the Kontinental Hockey League (KHL).

Suchý also played with the Slovakia national team in the 2000, 2003 and 2005 men's World Ice Hockey Championships. He won the silver medal in the 2000 Championship and the bronze medal in the 2003 Championship.

== Awards and achievements ==
- 1996–97 – QMJHL – Second All-Star Team
- 1996–97 – Memorial Cup – George Parsons Trophy

== Career statistics ==
=== Regular season and playoffs ===
| | | | Regular season | | | | | Playoffs |
| Season | Team | League | GP | G | A | Pts | PIM | GP | G | A | Pts | PIM |
|---|---|---|---|---|---|---|---|---|---|---|---|---|
| 1993–94 | TJ ŠKP PS Poprad | SVK U20 | 30 | 11 | 12 | 23 | 16 | — | — | — | — | — |
| 1993–94 | TJ ŠKP PS Poprad | SVK | 3 | 0 | 0 | 0 | 0 | — | — | — | — | — |
| 1994–95 | Sherbrooke Faucons | QMJHL | 69 | 12 | 32 | 44 | 30 | 7 | 0 | 3 | 3 | 2 |
| 1995–96 | Sherbrooke Faucons | QMJHL | 68 | 15 | 53 | 68 | 68 | 7 | 0 | 3 | 3 | 2 |
| 1996–97 | Sherbrooke Faucons | QMJHL | 32 | 6 | 34 | 40 | 14 | — | — | — | — | — |
| 1996–97 | Chicoutimi Saguenéens | QMJHL | 28 | 5 | 24 | 29 | 24 | 19 | 6 | 15 | 21 | 12 |
| 1996–97 | Chicoutimi Saguenéens | M-Cup | — | — | — | — | — | 3 | 0 | 2 | 2 | 0 |
| 1997–98 | Las Vegas Thunder | IHL | 26 | 1 | 4 | 5 | 10 | — | — | — | — | — |
| 1997–98 | Springfield Falcons | AHL | 41 | 6 | 15 | 21 | 16 | 4 | 0 | 1 | 1 | 2 |
| 1998–99 | Springfield Falcons | AHL | 69 | 4 | 32 | 36 | 10 | 3 | 0 | 1 | 1 | 0 |
| 1999–00 | Phoenix Coyotes | NHL | 60 | 0 | 6 | 6 | 16 | 5 | 0 | 1 | 1 | 0 |
| 1999–00 | Springfield Falcons | AHL | 2 | 0 | 1 | 1 | 0 | — | — | — | — | — |
| 2000–01 | Phoenix Coyotes | NHL | 72 | 0 | 10 | 10 | 22 | — | — | — | — | — |
| 2001–02 | Phoenix Coyotes | NHL | 81 | 5 | 12 | 17 | 10 | 5 | 1 | 0 | 1 | 0 |
| 2002–03 | Phoenix Coyotes | NHL | 77 | 1 | 8 | 9 | 18 | — | — | — | — | — |
| 2003–04 | Phoenix Coyotes | NHL | 82 | 7 | 14 | 21 | 8 | — | — | — | — | — |
| 2004–05 | HK Tatravagónka ŠKP Poprad | SVK | 34 | 5 | 10 | 15 | 24 | 5 | 0 | 0 | 0 | 2 |
| 2005–06 | Columbus Blue Jackets | NHL | 79 | 1 | 7 | 8 | 30 | — | — | — | — | — |
| 2006–07 | ZSC Lions | NLA | 44 | 4 | 10 | 14 | 38 | 7 | 0 | 0 | 0 | 12 |
| 2007–08 | ZSC Lions | NLA | 50 | 5 | 19 | 24 | 52 | 17 | 0 | 2 | 2 | 26 |
| 2008–09 | ZSC Lions | NLA | 48 | 6 | 25 | 31 | 69 | 4 | 1 | 1 | 2 | 6 |
| 2009–10 | ZSC Lions | NLA | 44 | 2 | 23 | 25 | 28 | 7 | 0 | 4 | 4 | 8 |
| 2010–11 | HK Poprad | SVK | 53 | 3 | 26 | 29 | 57 | 18 | 0 | 9 | 9 | 31 |
| 2011–12 | Avangard Omsk | KHL | 5 | 0 | 2 | 2 | 2 | — | — | — | — | — |
| 2011–12 | HK AutoFinance Poprad | SVK | 44 | 5 | 22 | 27 | 43 | 6 | 0 | 4 | 4 | 8 |
| 2012–13 | HK AutoFinance Poprad | SVK | 35 | 3 | 21 | 24 | 56 | 7 | 0 | 1 | 1 | 24 |
| 2013–14 | HK Poprad | SVK | 37 | 2 | 12 | 14 | 26 | — | — | — | — | — |
| 2014–15 | HK Poprad | SVK | 54 | 3 | 20 | 23 | 18 | 12 | 1 | 4 | 5 | 8 |
| 2015–16 | HK Poprad | SVK | 47 | 1 | 24 | 25 | 16 | 5 | 0 | 2 | 2 | 4 |
| 2016–17 | HK Poprad | SVK | 47 | 8 | 12 | 20 | 14 | 4 | 0 | 1 | 1 | 0 |
| 2017–18 | MHk 32 Liptovský Mikuláš | SVK | 44 | 1 | 15 | 16 | 12 | — | — | — | — | — |
| 2018–19 | MHk 32 Liptovský Mikuláš | SVK | 41 | 4 | 10 | 14 | 12 | — | — | — | — | — |
| SVK totals | | | 439 | 35 | 172 | 207 | 278 | 57 | 1 | 21 | 22 | 77 |
| NHL totals | | | 451 | 14 | 57 | 71 | 104 | 10 | 1 | 1 | 2 | 0 |

=== International ===
Radoslav Suchý
Medal record

Representing Slovakia

Ice hockey

World Championships
| Silver medal – second place | 2000 St Petersburg | Ice hockey |
| Bronze medal – third place | 2003 Helsinki | Ice hockey |

| Year | Team | Event | GP | G | A | Pts | PIM |
|---|---|---|---|---|---|---|---|
| 1994 | Slovakia | EJC C | 6 | 1 | 7 | 8 | 2 |
| 1996 | Slovakia | WJC | 6 | 2 | 1 | 3 | 0 |
| 2000 | Slovakia | WC | 8 | | 5 | 5 | 0 |
| 2003 | Slovakia | WC | 9 | 0 | 3 | 3 | 4 |
| 2004 | Slovakia | WCH | 3 | 0 | 0 | 0 | 0 |
| 2005 | Slovakia | WC | 7 | 0 | 0 | 0 | 0 |
| 2006 | Slovakia | OLY | 6 | 1 | 1 | 2 | 0 |
| Senior totals | | | 33 | 1 | 9 | 10 | 4 |
