= Christian Dubé (ice hockey) =

Canadian/Swiss ice hockey player and executive

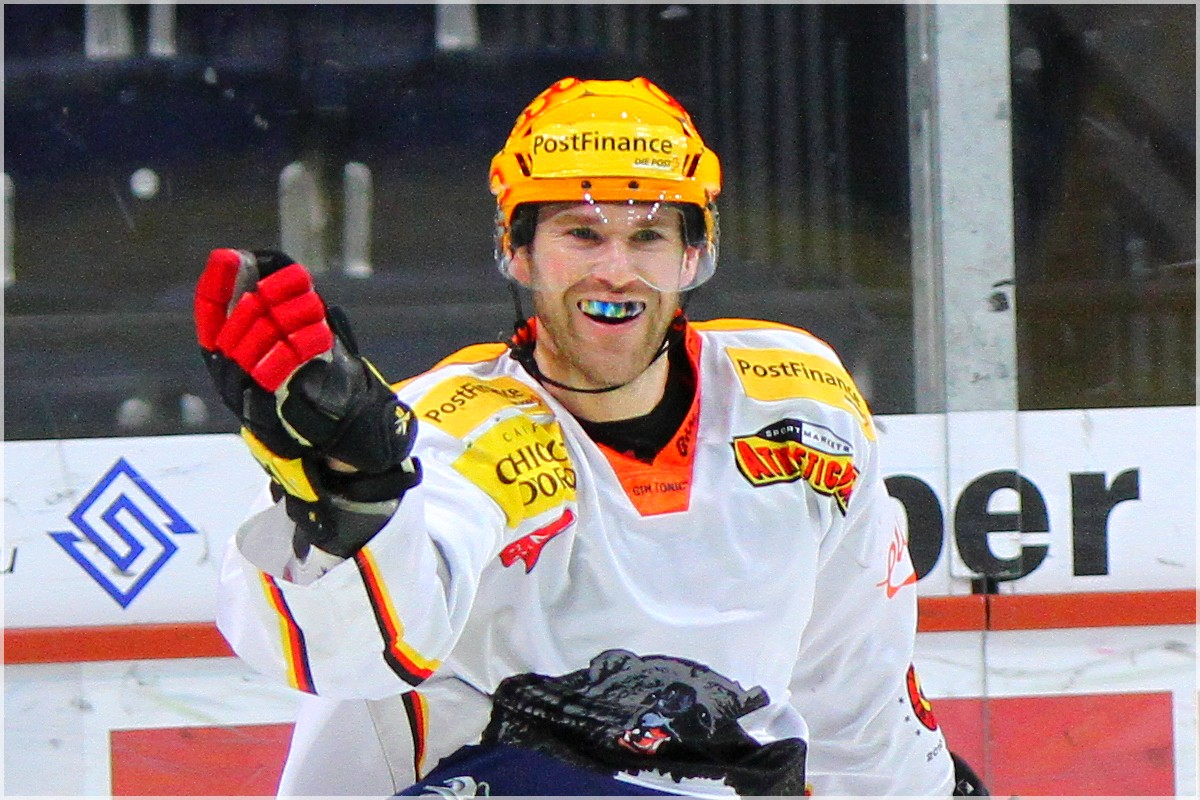
- Dubé with SC Bern in 2011
- Born: April 25, 1977 (age 48) Sherbrooke, Quebec, Canada
- Height: 5 ft 11 in (180 cm)
- Weight: 170 lb (77 kg; 12 st 2 lb)
- Position: Right wing
- Shot: Left
- Played for: NHL; New York Rangers; NLA; HC Lugano; SC Bern; HC Fribourg-Gottéron
- NHL draft: 39th overall, 1995; New York Rangers
- Playing career: 1995–2015

Christian Dubé (born April 25, 1977) is a Canadian-Swiss ice hockey executive and former professional right winger. He is currently the sports director of EHC Biel-Bienne in the Swiss National League A.

== Biography ==
Dubé was born in Sherbrooke, Quebec. He is the son of former pro hockey player Norm Dubé.

As a youth, Dubé played in the 1990 and 1991 Quebec International Pee-Wee Hockey Tournaments with a minor ice hockey team from Sherbrooke. He spent many years growing up in Switzerland, while his father was playing there. He returned to Canada as a teenager, and played for the Sherbrooke Faucons of the Quebec Major Junior Hockey League.

In 1995, he was drafted by the New York Rangers with the 39th pick. He made his debut with the Rangers in the 1996–97 season. He would play another 6 games with the Rangers in 1998–99. After that season he headed back to Switzerland, where he played, three season at HC Lugano, nine seasons for SC Bern and another four years at HC Fribourg-Gottéron. Because he started playing hockey as a child in Switzerland, he could join teams in Switzerland as a non-import player without having Swiss citizenship.

Dubé retired following the 2014-15 season and was named sports director of Swiss NLA side HC Fribourg-Gottéron in March 2015.

== Career statistics ==
=== Regular season and playoffs ===
			Regular season					Playoffs
Season	Team	League	GP	G	A	Pts	PIM	GP	G	A	Pts	PIM
1991–92	HC Martigny	NDB	—	—	—	—	—	2	0	0	0	0
1992–93	HC Martigny	SUI U20	27	36	40	76	34	—	—	—	—	—
1993–94	Sherbrooke Faucons	QMJHL	72	31	41	72	22	11	2	3	5	8
1993–94	HC Martigny	NDB	—	—	—	—	—	2	0	1	1	0
1994–95	HC Martigny	NDB	1	0	0	0	0	—	—	—	—	—
1994–95	Sherbrooke Faucons	QMJHL	71	36	65	101	43	7	1	7	8	8
1995–96	Sherbrooke Faucons	QMJHL	62	52	93	145	105	7	5	5	10	6
1996–97	Hull Olympiques	QMJHL	19	15	22	37	27	14	7	16	23	14
1996–97	New York Rangers	NHL	27	1	1	2	4	3	0	0	0	0
1996–97	Hull Olympiques	MC	—	—	—	—	—	4	6	7	13	2
1997–98	Hartford Wolf Pack	AHL	79	11	46	57	46	9	0	4	4	6
1998–99	New York Rangers	NHL	6	0	0	0	0	—	—	—	—	—
1998–99	Hartford Wolf Pack	AHL	58	21	30	51	20	6	0	3	3	4
1999–2000	HC Lugano	NLA	45	25	26	51	52	14	8	12	20	14
2000–01	HC Lugano	NLA	44	20	34	54	50	18	4	14	18	22
2001–02	HC Lugano	NLA	38	22	37	59	22	13	4	13	17	14
2002–03	SC Bern	NLA	44	15	36	51	26	13	4	8	12	14
2003–04	SC Bern	NLA	35	14	35	49	24	15	3	16	19	8
2004–05	SC Bern	NLA	34	12	26	38	20	11	4	5	9	8
2005–06	SC Bern	NLA	38	7	25	32	48	6	1	2	3	8
2006–07	SC Bern	NLA	40	16	38	54	36	17	0	16	16	24
2007–08	SC Bern	NLA	47	10	42	52	30	6	1	4	5	12
2008–09	SC Bern	NLA	46	15	41	56	32	6	3	2	5	2
2009–10	SC Bern	NLA	5	1	5	6	0	13	2	8	10	12
2010–11	SC Bern	NLA	44	14	35	49	18	11	2	4	6	6
2011–12	HC Fribourg–Gottéron	NLA	40	8	28	36	55	11	3	3	6	4
2012–13	HC Fribourg–Gottéron	NLA	48	13	29	42	18	16	0	9	9	2
2013–14	HC Fribourg–Gottéron	NLA	36	8	12	20	8	10	1	6	7	6
2014–15	HC Fribourg–Gottéron	NLA	46	10	15	25	43	6	1	2	3	25
NHL totals			33	1	1	2	4	3	0	0	0	0
AHL totals			137	32	76	108	66	15	0	7	7	10
NLA totals			630	210	464	674	482	186	41	124	165	181

=== International ===
Year	Team	Event	GP	G	A	Pts	PIM
1996	Canada	WJC	6	4	2	6	0
1997	Canada	WJC	7	4	3	7	0
Junior totals			13	8	5	13	0

Preceded by David Ling	CHL Player of the Year; 1996	Succeeded by Alyn McCauley

Preceded by Éric Dazé	QMJHL Frank J. Selke Memorial Trophy; 1996	Succeeded by Daniel Brière
