= Colin White (ice hockey, born 1977) =

Canadian ice hockey player (born 1977)

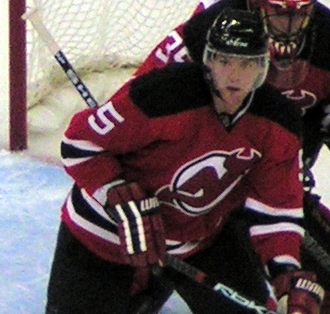
- White with the New Jersey Devils in 2008
- Born: December 12, 1977 (age 48) New Glasgow, Nova Scotia, Canada
- Height: 6 ft 4 in (193 cm)
- Weight: 215 lb (98 kg; 15 st 5 lb)
- Position: Defence
- Shot: Left
- Played for: New Jersey Devils; San Jose Sharks
- NHL draft: 49th overall, 1996; New Jersey Devils
- Playing career: 1997–2012

Colin White (born December 12, 1977) is a Canadian former professional ice hockey player. He previously played with the New Jersey Devils and the San Jose Sharks of the National Hockey League (NHL).

== Early life ==
White was born and raised in New Glasgow, Nova Scotia.

== Playing career ==
White played Midget hockey for the Weeks Major Midget AAA in New Glasgow, Nova Scotia, before going to the Quebec Maritimes Junior Hockey League (QMJHL) to play for the Laval Titan Collège Français and Hull Olympiques. While playing in the QMJHL, he was drafted 49th overall in the 1996 NHL entry draft by the New Jersey Devils.

In 1997, White won the Memorial Cup with the Hull Olympiques. During the 2000–01 season, White put up 20 points, helping the Devils to the Stanley Cup Final.

During the 2007–08 pre-season, White suffered a serious eye injury. During a team practice on September 19, "White was defending against two-on-one rushes when John Madden gave rookie Nicklas Bergfors the puck for a shot that deflected off White's stick and hit him in the nose and near the right eye." White was able to return to the lineup on November 21 to play in the Devils' 2–1 victory over the Pittsburgh Penguins. Despite still suffering from some blurred vision in his right eye, he was able to play over 17 minutes, blocked two shots, and was credited with six of the Devils' fifteen hits. White quickly returned to his regular spot in the Devils line-up, where he began wearing a protective visor on his helmet.

In the 2008–09 season, White played 71 games, finishing the season with one goal, 17 assists and a plus–minus of 18, one of his highest career offensive seasons.

On February 2, 2010, for the first time in nearly four years, White fought Maple Leafs defensemen Dion Phaneuf for taking a run at teammate Zach Parise's head. The following season, White fought with Bruno Gervais of the New York Islanders. White had previously hit P. A. Parenteau, which sparked the fight that ended with White fracturing Gervais' cheekbone.

White established himself as a physical, defensive defenseman, often leading the Devils in penalty minutes to go with his relatively low offensive production. During his Devils tenure, White served several times as an alternate captain.

On August 1, 2011, White was placed on waivers by the New Jersey Devils along with Trent Hunter. He was then bought out from the final year of his contract on August 2 after clearing. On August 3, White was signed by the San Jose Sharks to a one-year, $1M contract.

On May 31, 2012, it was announced that White's jersey number 24 was to be retired by his junior team, the Gatineau Olympiques, formerly the Hull Olympiques. He became the fifth player to have his jersey retired, joining the likes of Luc Robitaille and Jose Theodore, on November 8, 2012.

At the conclusion of the 2012–13 NHL lockout, after White accepted an invitation to the St. Louis Blues training camp. On January 18, 2013, the Blues announced that they had released White from his professional tryout.

== Post-retirement ==
White is an ambassador for the New Jersey Devils' alumni association along with Bruce Driver, Ken Daneyko, Grant Marshall and Jim Dowd.

== Personal life ==
White has three children.

== Career statistics ==
			Regular season					Playoffs
Season	Team	League	GP	G	A	Pts	PIM	GP	G	A	Pts	PIM
1994–95	Laval Titan Collège Français	QMJHL	7	0	1	1	32	—	—	—	—	—
1994–95	Hull Olympiques	QMJHL	5	0	1	1	4	12	0	0	0	23
1995–96	Hull Olympiques	QMJHL	62	2	8	10	303	18	0	4	4	42
1996–97	Hull Olympiques	QMJHL	63	3	12	15	297	14	3	12	15	65
1997–98	Albany River Rats	AHL	76	3	13	16	235	13	0	0	0	55
1998–99	Albany River Rats	AHL	77	2	12	14	265	5	0	1	1	8
1999–2000	Albany River Rats	AHL	52	5	21	26	176	—	—	—	—	—
1999–2000	New Jersey Devils	NHL	21	2	1	3	40	23	1	5	6	18
2000–01	New Jersey Devils	NHL	82	1	19	20	155	25	0	3	3	42
2001–02	New Jersey Devils	NHL	73	2	3	5	133	6	0	0	0	2
2002–03	New Jersey Devils	NHL	72	5	8	13	98	24	0	5	5	29
2003–04	New Jersey Devils	NHL	75	2	11	13	96	5	0	0	0	4
2005–06	New Jersey Devils	NHL	73	3	14	17	91	4	0	0	0	4
2006–07	New Jersey Devils	NHL	69	0	8	8	69	7	0	0	0	6
2007–08	New Jersey Devils	NHL	57	2	8	10	26	5	0	0	0	6
2008–09	New Jersey Devils	NHL	71	1	17	18	46	7	0	1	1	6
2009–10	New Jersey Devils	NHL	81	2	10	12	46	5	1	0	1	8
2010–11	New Jersey Devils	NHL	69	0	6	6	48	—	—	—	—	—
2011–12	San Jose Sharks	NHL	54	1	3	4	21	3	1	0	1	0
NHL totals			797	21	108	129	869	114	3	14	17	125

== Awards and honours ==
Award	Year
NHL
Stanley Cup	1999–2000, 2002–03
NHL All-Rookie Team	2000–01
