= Marc Chouinard =

Canadian ice hockey player

- Born: May 6, 1977 (age 48) Charlesbourg, Quebec, Canada
- Height: 6 ft 5 in (196 cm)
- Weight: 206 lb (93 kg; 14 st 10 lb)
- Position: Centre
- Shot: Right
- Played for: Mighty Ducks of Anaheim; Minnesota Wild; Vancouver Canucks
- NHL draft: 32nd overall, 1995; Winnipeg Jets
- Playing career: 1998–2010

Marc Chouinard (born May 6, 1977) is a Canadian former professional ice hockey centre-winger who played six seasons in the National Hockey League (NHL).

== Biography ==
Chouinard was born in Charlesbourg, Quebec City. As a youth, he played in the 1990 and 1991 Quebec International Pee-Wee Hockey Tournaments with a minor ice hockey team from Charlesbourg.

Chouinard started his career in the Quebec Major Junior Hockey League in 1993. After two successful seasons, he was drafted in the second round, 32nd overall by the Winnipeg Jets during the 1995 NHL entry draft. He never played for the Jets, and on February 4, 1996 Chouinard and Teemu Selanne were traded to the Mighty Ducks of Anaheim in exchange for Oleg Tverdovsky and Chad Kilger. After three years with the Cincinnati Mighty Ducks, Chouinard was called up during the 2000–01 NHL season.

His uncle is Guy Chouinard, and he is a cousin of Éric Chouinard.

== Career statistics ==
=== Regular season and playoffs ===
			Regular season					Playoffs
Season	Team	League	GP	G	A	Pts	PIM	GP	G	A	Pts	PIM
1992–93	Beauboury Selects	QAHA	28	26	45	71	42	—	—	—	—	—
1992–93	Sainte-Foy Gouverneurs	QMAAA	3	1	1	2	2	12	9	9	18	—
1993–94	Beauport Harfangs	QMJHL	62	11	19	30	23	13	2	5	7	2
1994–95	Beauport Harfangs	QMJHL	68	24	40	64	32	18	1	6	7	4
1995–96	Beauport Harfangs	QMJHL	30	14	21	35	19	—	—	—	—	—
1995–96	Halifax Mooseheads	QMJHL	24	6	12	18	17	6	2	1	3	2
1996–97	Halifax Mooseheads	QMJHL	63	24	49	73	52	18	9	16	25	12
1997–98	Cincinnati Mighty Ducks	AHL	8	1	2	3	4	—	—	—	—	—
1998–99	Cincinnati Mighty Ducks	AHL	69	7	8	15	20	3	0	0	0	4
1999–00	Cincinnati Mighty Ducks	AHL	70	17	16	33	29	—	—	—	—	—
2000–01	Cincinnati Mighty Ducks	AHL	32	10	9	19	4	—	—	—	—	—
2000–01	Anaheim Mighty Ducks	NHL	44	3	4	7	12	—	—	—	—	—
2001–02	Anaheim Mighty Ducks	NHL	45	4	5	9	10	—	—	—	—	—
2002–03	Anaheim Mighty Ducks	NHL	70	3	4	7	40	15	1	0	1	0
2003–04	Minnesota Wild	NHL	45	11	10	21	17	—	—	—	—	—
2004–05	Frisk Asker	NOR	16	9	8	17	26	3	5	2	7	24
2005–06	Minnesota Wild	NHL	74	14	16	30	34	—	—	—	—	—
2006–07	Vancouver Canucks	NHL	42	2	2	4	10	—	—	—	—	—
2006–07	Manitoba Moose	AHL	13	3	1	4	5	4	0	0	0	4
2007–08	Fribourg-Gottéron	NLA	44	13	11	24	52	9	2	6	8	10
2008–09	Fribourg-Gottéron	NLA	10	4	2	6	20	3	1	0	1	0
2009–10	Kölner Haie	DEL	19	5	6	11	20	3	1	1	2	2
NHL totals			320	37	41	78	123	15	1	0	1	0
