= Pavel Rosa =

Czech ice hockey player

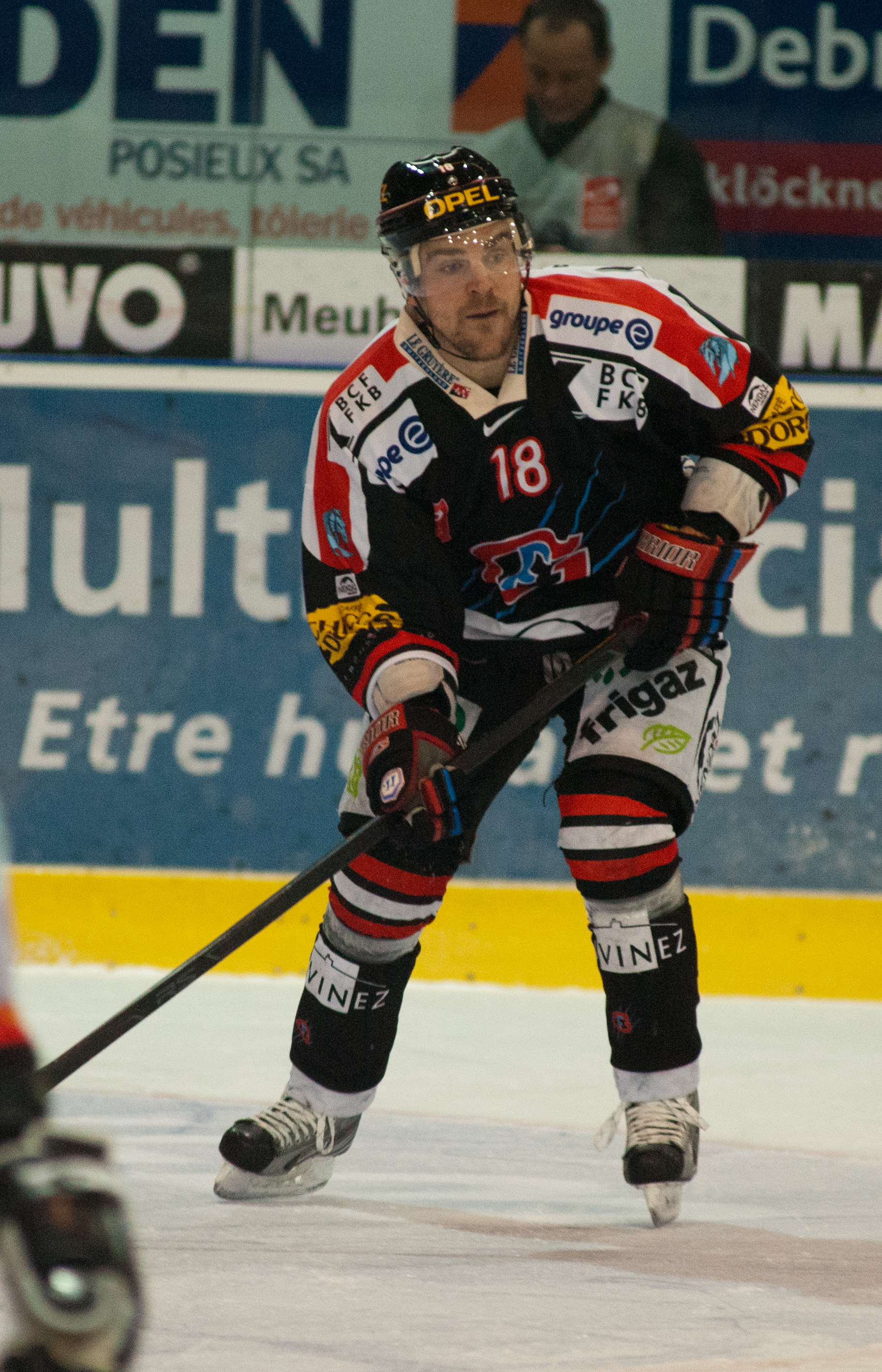
- Rosa in 2011
- Born: June 7, 1977 (age 48) Most, Czechoslovakia
- Height: 5 ft 11 in (180 cm)
- Weight: 194 lb (88 kg; 13 st 12 lb)
- Position: Right wing
- Shot: Right
- Played for: HC Litvínov; Los Angeles Kings; HPK Hameenlinna; Jokerit; Dynamo Moscow; Timra IK; Avangard Omsk; Rögle BK; Oulun Kärpät; HC Fribourg-Gottéron; HC Lugano; Pelicans; Orli Znojmo
- NHL draft: 50th overall, 1995; Los Angeles Kings
- Playing career: 1994–2015

Pavel Rosa (born June 7, 1977) is a Czech former professional ice hockey forward who played in the National Hockey League (NHL) with the Los Angeles Kings.

== Playing career ==
Rosa was selected by Kings in the second round (#50 overall) 1995 NHL entry draft, As a highly skilled forward, Rosa played in 36 games for the Kings since the 1998–99 season. Rosa most notably burst onto the North American stage in scoring two goals in his first NHL game.

During his junior career, he played with the Hull Olympiques and was one of the offensive leaders of a team that won the Memorial Cup in 1997. As a professional, he has played for the Manchester Monarchs and Fredericton Canadiens of the American Hockey League, Long Beach Ice Dogs of the International Hockey League, HPK and Jokerit of the Finnish Hockey League, HC Dynamo Moscow of the Russian hockey league, the Los Angeles Kings in the National Hockey League, and most recently Timrå IK, Rögle BK of the Swedish Elitserien league.

On July 7, 2014, Rosa signed as a free agent from Pelicans of the Liiga, to join on a one-year contract Czech based club, Orli Znojmo, who compete in the Austrian EBEL.

== Career statistics ==
=== Regular season and playoffs ===
			Regular season					Playoffs
Season	Team	League	GP	G	A	Pts	PIM	GP	G	A	Pts	PIM
1994–95	HC Litvínov, s.r.o.	CZE U18	40	56	42	98	—	—	—	—	—	—
1994–95	HC Litvínov, s.r.o.	CZE	—	—	—	—	—	1	0	0	0	0
1995–96	Hull Olympiques	QMJHL	61	46	70	116	39	18	14	22	36	25
1996–97	Hull Olympiques	QMJHL	68	63	89	152	56	14	18	13	31	16
1996–97	Hull Olympiques	M-Cup	—	—	—	—	—	4	3	5	8	2
1997–98	Long Beach Ice Dogs	IHL	2	0	1	1	0	1	1	1	2	0
1997–98	Fredericton Canadiens	AHL	1	0	0	0	0	—	—	—	—	—
1998–99	Los Angeles Kings	NHL	29	4	12	16	6	—	—	—	—	—
1998–99	Long Beach Ice Dogs	IHL	31	17	13	30	28	6	1	2	3	0
1999–00	Los Angeles Kings	NHL	3	0	0	0	0	—	—	—	—	—
1999–00	Long Beach Ice Dogs	IHL	74	22	31	53	76	6	2	2	4	4
2000–01	HPK	SM-l	54	25	26	51	53	—	—	—	—	—
2001–02	Jokerit	SM-l	46	21	22	43	37	12	3	5	8	18
2002–03	Manchester Monarchs	AHL	61	28	35	63	20	3	3	1	4	4
2002–03	Los Angeles Kings	NHL	2	0	0	0	0	—	—	—	—	—
2003–04	Manchester Monarchs	AHL	77	39	49	88	32	6	3	6	9	6
2003–04	Los Angeles Kings	NHL	2	1	1	2	0	—	—	—	—	—
2004–05	Dynamo Moscow	RSL	54	21	23	44	14	8	3	2	5	2
2005–06	Dynamo Moscow	RSL	35	8	11	19	8	—	—	—	—	—
2005–06	Timrå IK	SEL	10	5	1	6	2	—	—	—	—	—
2006–07	Avangard Omsk	RSL	54	23	17	40	14	11	5	5	10	10
2007–08	Avangard Omsk	RSL	52	18	17	35	40	4	0	1	1	4
2008–09	Avangard Omsk	KHL	35	8	8	16	30	—	—	—	—	—
2008–09	Rögle BK	SEL	10	1	2	3	0	—	—	—	—	—
2009–10	Kärpät	SM-l	45	19	32	51	10	10	3	3	6	18
2010–11	Kärpät	SM-l	37	6	24	30	18	2	2	1	3	25
2010–11	HC Fribourg–Gottéron	NLA	11	6	11	17	0	—	—	—	—	—
2011–12	HC Fribourg–Gottéron	NLA	35	16	23	39	6	8	3	3	6	6
2012–13	HC Fribourg–Gottéron	NLA	13	0	9	9	4	—	—	—	—	—
2012–13	HC Lugano	NLA	9	2	9	11	2	4	1	2	3	2
2013–14	HC Verva Litvínov	CZE	11	3	1	4	2	—	—	—	—	—
2013–14	Pelicans	FIN	20	6	4	10	6	8	0	3	3	4
2014–15	Orli Znojmo	AUT	16	11	10	21	5	—	—	—	—	—
SM-l/FIN totals			202	77	108	185	124	32	8	12	20	65
RSL totals			195	70	68	138	78	23	8	8	16	16
NHL totals			36	5	13	18	6	—	—	—	—	—

=== International ===
Year	Team	Event	GP	G	A	Pts	PIM
1995	Czech Republic	EJC	5	8	3	11	0
1996	Czech Republic	WJC	6	0	0	0	2
Junior totals			11	8	3	11	2

== Awards ==
2003-04: AHL John B. Sollenberger Trophy
