= Jonathan Delisle =

Canadian ice hockey player

- Born: June 30, 1977 Sainte-Anne-des-Plaines, Quebec, Canada
- Died: March 16, 2006 (aged 28) Beauceville, Quebec, Canada
- Height: 5 ft 10 in (178 cm)
- Weight: 180 lb (82 kg; 12 st 12 lb)
- Position: Right wing
- Shot: Right
- Played for: Montreal Canadiens; Bracknell Bees
- NHL draft: 86th overall, 1995; Montreal Canadiens
- Playing career: 1997–2006

Joseph Jonathan Delisle (June 30, 1977 – March 16, 2006) was a Canadian professional ice hockey right winger. He played one game in the National Hockey League with the Montreal Canadiens during the 1998–99 season. The rest of his career, which lasted from 1997 to 2006, was spent in the minor leagues.

== Early life ==
Delisle was born in Sainte-Anne-des-Plaines, Quebec. As a youth, he played in the 1991 Quebec International Pee-Wee Hockey Tournament with the Northern Selects minor ice hockey team.

== Playing career ==
Delisle was drafted in the fourth round, 86th overall, of the 1995 NHL entry draft by the Montreal Canadiens. He played one game in the National Hockey League with the Canadiens during the 1998–99 NHL season, against the Ottawa Senators on October 21, 1998. He went scoreless in 4:32 of ice time.

== Death ==
He died in car accident in Beauceville, Québec on March 16, 2006.

== Career statistics ==
=== Regular season and playoffs ===
			Regular season					Playoffs
Season	Team	League	GP	G	A	Pts	PIM	GP	G	A	Pts	PIM
1992–93	Laval-Laurentides-Lanaudière Régents	QMAAA	14	3	3	6	12	13	2	5	7	24
1993–94	Verdun College-Francais	QMJHL	61	16	17	33	130	4	0	1	1	14
1994–95	Hull Olympiques	QMJHL	60	21	38	59	218	19	11	8	19	43
1994–95	Hull Olympiques	M-Cup	—	—	—	—	—	3	2	0	2	12
1995–96	Hull Olympiques	QMJHL	62	31	57	88	193	18	6	13	19	64
1996–97	Hull Olympiques	QMJHL	61	35	53	88	210	14	11	13	24	48
1996–97	Hull Olympiques	M-Cup	—	—	—	—	—	4	1	6	7	12
1997–98	Fredericton Canadiens	AHL	78	15	21	36	138	4	0	1	1	7
1998–99	Montreal Canadiens	NHL	1	0	0	0	0	—	—	—	—	—
1998–99	Fredericton Canadiens	AHL	78	7	29	36	118	15	3	6	9	39
1999–00	Quebec Citadelles	AHL	62	7	19	26	142	3	0	0	0	2
2000–01	Quebec Citadelles	AHL	71	6	18	24	201	6	1	0	1	53
2001–02	New Mexico Scorpions	CHL	32	13	17	30	102	—	—	—	—	—
2001–02	Quebec Citadelles	AHL	24	0	3	3	37	—	—	—	—	—
2002–03	Bracknell Bees	BISL	32	8	11	19	57	15	2	5	7	65
2003–04	Garaga de Saint-Georges	QSPHL	49	21	59	80	154	22	7	17	24	87
2004–05	Garaga de Saint-Georges	LNAH	57	20	52	72	169	9	2	2	4	49
2005–06	Garaga de Saint-Georges	LNAH	46	16	26	42	177	—	—	—	—	—
AHL totals			313	35	90	125	636	28	4	7	11	103
NHL totals			1	0	0	0	0	—	—	—	—	—

== See also ==
- List of players who played only one game in the NHL
