= David Gosselin =

Canadian ice hockey player

- Born: June 22, 1977 (age 48) Lévis, Quebec, Canada
- Height: 6 ft 0 in (183 cm)
- Weight: 195 lb (88 kg; 13 st 13 lb)
- Position: Right wing
- Shot: Right
- Played for: Nashville Predators
- NHL draft: 78th overall, 1995; New Jersey Devils
- Playing career: 1998–2012

David Gosselin (born June 22, 1977) is a Canadian former professional ice hockey left winger who played 13 games in the National Hockey League for the Nashville Predators between 2000 and 2001. The rest of his career, which lasted from 1998 to 2012, was mainly spent in the minor leagues. He was drafted 78th overall by the New Jersey Devils in the 1995 NHL entry draft and made his NHL debut for the Predators during the 1999–00 NHL season.

== Career statistics ==
=== Regular season and playoffs ===
			Regular season					Playoffs
Season	Team	League	GP	G	A	Pts	PIM	GP	G	A	Pts	PIM
1992–93	Richelieu Riverains	QMAAA	40	5	12	17	24	4	0	0	0	2
1993–94	Richelieu Riverains	QMAAA	44	26	19	45	62	4	2	1	3	0
1994–95	Sherbrooke Faucons	QMJHL	58	8	8	16	36	7	0	0	0	2
1995–96	Sherbrooke Faucons	QMJHL	55	24	24	48	147	7	2	2	4	4
1996–97	Sherbrooke Faucons	QMJHL	23	11	5	26	52	—	—	—	—	—
1996–97	Chicoutimi Sagueneens	QMJHL	28	17	35	52	60	12	9	7	16	16
1996–97	Chicoutimi Sagueneens	M-Cup	—	—	—	—	—	3	3	2	5	2
1997–98	Chicoutimi Sagueneens	QMJHL	69	46	64	110	139	6	1	4	5	8
1998–99	Milwaukee Admirals	IHL	74	17	11	28	78	2	0	2	2	2
1999–00	Nashville Predators	NHL	10	2	1	3	6	—	—	—	—	—
1999–00	Milwaukee Admirals	IHL	70	21	20	41	118	3	0	0	0	10
2000–01	Milwaukee Admirals	IHL	32	5	9	14	56	—	—	—	—	—
2001–02	Nashville Predators	NHL	3	0	0	0	5	—	—	—	—	—
2001–02	Milwaukee Admirals	AHL	66	11	21	32	112	—	—	—	—	—
2002–03	Utah Grizzlies	AHL	80	12	22	34	141	2	0	1	1	6
2003–04	Frankfurt Lions	DEL	43	6	9	15	48	15	7	8	15	20
2004–05	Kassel Huskies	DEL	50	7	8	15	48	—	—	—	—	—
2005–06	Frankfurt Lions	DEL	50	12	8	20	124	—	—	—	—	—
2006–07	Bietigheim Steelers	GER-2	49	20	23	43	137	—	—	—	—	—
2007–08	Alba Volán Székesfehérvár	EBEL	12	2	1	3	22	—	—	—	—	—
2007–08	Alba Volán Székesfehérvár	HUN	1	1	0	1	0	—	—	—	—	—
2007–08	Saint-Jean Chiefs	LNAH	36	20	29	49	62	4	3	3	6	6
2008–09	98.3 FM de Saguenay	LNAH	34	10	21	31	59	3	1	1	2	4
2009–10	Saguenay Marquis	LNAH	17	4	7	11	12	—	—	—	—	—
2009–10	Isothermic de Thetford Mines	LNAH	5	1	3	4	8	5	1	1	2	8
2010–11	Rivière-du-Loup 3L	LNAH	40	15	20	35	72	9	3	5	8	25
2011–12	Rivière-du-Loup 3L	LNAH	31	11	20	31	41	—	—	—	—	—
DEL totals			143	25	25	50	220	21	8	8	16	61
NHL totals			13	2	1	3	11	—	—	—	—	—
