= Sébastien Charpentier (ice hockey) =

Canadian ice hockey player (born 1977)

- Born: April 18, 1977 (age 49) Drummondville, Quebec, Canada
- Height: 5 ft 9 in (175 cm)
- Weight: 177 lb (80 kg; 12 st 9 lb)
- Position: Goaltender
- Caught: Left
- Played for: Washington Capitals; HK MVD; Vityaz Chekhov; Vienna Capitals; Graz 99ers
- NHL draft: 93rd overall, 1995; Washington Capitals
- Playing career: 1997–2010

Sébastien Charpentier (born April 18, 1977) is a Canadian former professional ice hockey goaltender. He played 26 games in the National Hockey League with the Washington Capitals from 2002 to 2004. The rest of his career, which lasted from 1997 to 2013, was mainly spent in the minor leagues.

== Early life ==
Charpentier was born in Drummondville, Quebec. As a youth, he played in the 1991 Quebec International Pee-Wee Hockey Tournament with a minor ice hockey team from Drummondville. In junior ice hockey, he was named to Quebec Major Junior Hockey League all-rookie team in the 1994–95 QMJHL season.

== Career ==
Charpentier was drafted 93rd overall by the Washington Capitals in the 1995 NHL entry draft. He spent most of his professional career with their American Hockey League affiliate, the Portland Pirates. He played a total of 24 NHL games for the Capitals. He was named the ECHL playoff most valuable player in the 1997–98 ECHL season.

He later played with the Graz 99ers of the Austrian Erste Bank Hockey League until he retired in 2013. As of 2018, he is the goalie coach for the Victoriaville Tigres of the QMJHL.

== Career statistics ==
=== Regular season and playoffs ===
			Regular season										Playoffs
Season	Team	League	GP	W	L	T	OTL	MIN	GA	SO	GAA	SV%	GP	W	L	MIN	GA	SO	GAA	SV%
1991–92	Drummondville	QAHA	14	—	—	—	—	840	34	2	2.42	—	—	—	—	—	—	—	—	—
1992–93	Drummondville	QAHA	20	—	—	—	—	1215	37	7	1.80	—	—	—	—	—	—	—	—	—
1993–94	Magog Cantonniers	QAHA	24	14	5	1	—	1443	75	1	3.16	—	—	—	—	—	—	—	—	—
1994–95	Laval Titan Collège Français	QMJHL	41	25	12	1	—	2152	99	2	2	.909	16	9	4	886	45	0	3.05	.889
1995–96	Laval Titan Collège Français	QMJHL	18	4	10	0	—	938	97	0	6.20	.836	—	—	—	—	—	—	—	—
1995–96	Val-d'Or Foreurs	QMJHL	33	21	9	1	—	1906	87	1	2.74	.910	13	7	5	740	45	0	3.64	.893
1996–97	Shawinigan Cataractes	QMJHL	62	37	17	4	—	3480	177	1	3.05	.899	4	2	1	196	13	0	3.98	.863
1997–98	Portland Pirates	AHL	4	1	3	0	—	229	10	0	2.61	.926	—	—	—	—	—	—	—	—
1997–98	Hampton Roads Admirals	ECHL	43	20	16	6	—	2388	114	0	2.86	.899	18	14	4	1183	38	1	1.93	.941
1998–99	Quad City Mallards	UHL	6	0	0	0	—	4	0	0	0.00	1.000	—	—	—	—	—	—	—	—
1998–99	Portland Pirates	AHL	3	0	3	0	—	180	10	0	3.34	.891	—	—	—	—	—	—	—	—
1999–00	Portland Pirates	AHL	18	10	4	3	—	1041	48	0	2.77	.914	3	1	1	183	9	0	2.96	.911
2000–01	Portland Pirates	AHL	34	16	16	1	—	1978	113	1	3.43	.895	1	0	1	102	3	0	1.76	.956
2001–02	Washington Capitals	NHL	2	1	1	0	—	122	5	0	2.46	.936	—	—	—	—	—	—	—	—
2001–02	Portland Pirates	AHL	49	20	18	10	—	2941	131	3	2.67	.923	—	—	—	—	—	—	—	—
2002–03	Washington Capitals	NHL	17	5	7	1	—	40	0	0	2.79	.906	—	—	—	—	—	—	—	—
2002–03	Portland Pirates	AHL	12	3	7	2	—	727	28	2	2.31	.925	—	—	—	—	—	—	—	—
2003–04	Washington Capitals	NHL	7	0	6	0	—	369	21	0	3.41	.875	—	—	—	—	—	—	—	—
2004–05	Cousin de Saint-Hyacinthe	LNAH	34	—	—	—	—	—	—	—	3.79	.892	5	—	—	—	—	—	4.33	.896
2005–06	HC MVD	RSL	38	10	16	—	6	2155	86	1	2.39	.915	4	1	2	—	—	0	4.10	.901
2006–07	Vityaz Chekhov	RSL	37	12	19	—	3	2149	93	1	2.60	.909	2	0	2	—	—	0	5.00	.851
2007–08	Top Design de Saint-Hyacinthe	LNAH	3	—	—	—	—	—	—	—	4.54	.881	—	—	—	—	—	—	—	—
2007–08	Vienna Capitals	EBEL	27	19	8	—	0	—	—	5	2.20	.928	7	3	4	—	—	1	3.39	.881
2008–09	Graz 99ers	EBEL	2	—	—	—	—	—	—	0	4.53	.857	3	—	—	—	—	0	2.33	.932
2009–10	Graz 99ers	EBEL	17	11	5	—	0	—	—	0	2.36	.917	4	1	3	—	—	0	2.80	.896
2010–11	Marquis de Saguenay	LNAH	13	8	3	—	1	766	49	0	3.84	.900	—	—	—	—	—	—	—	—
2011–12	Bietigheim Steelers	GER-2	24	10	13	—	0	1386	83	1	3.59	—	—	—	—	—	—	—	—	—
2011–12	Marquis de Saguenay	LNAH	8	4	3	—	1	490	32	0	3.92	.875	—	—	—	—	—	—	—	—
2012–13	HC Carvena de Sorel-Tracy	LNAH	9	3	3	—	3	553	39	0	4.23	.872	6	—	—	—	—	—	2.67	.932
NHL totals			26	6	14	1	—	1351	66	0	2.93	.902	—	—	—	—	—	—	—	—
