= Harold MacKay =

Canadian lawyer and corporate director

Harold Hugh MacKay
- Born: August 1, 1940 (age 86); Regina, Saskatchewan
- Occupations: Lawyer, corporate director
- Awards: Order of Canada

Harold Hugh MacKay, OC QC (born August 1, 1940) is a Canadian lawyer and corporate director.

== Education ==
He received a Bachelor of Arts degree in 1960 from the University of Saskatchewan and a Bachelor of Laws degree in 1963 from Dalhousie University. He was called to the Bar of Saskatchewan in 1964. He was made a Queen's Counsel in 1981.

== Career ==
He joined the Western Canada law firm of MacPherson Leslie & Tyerman LLP as an Associate in 1963, becoming Partner in 1969, Managing Partner in 1989, and Chairman in 1997. He is currently a Counsel with the firm.

From 1997 to 1998, he chaired the Task Force on the Future of the Canadian Financial Services Sector.

From 2002 to 2003, he was the Clifford Clark Visiting Economist, a key advisory position for Canada's Department of Finance.

He is a member of the board of directors of The Toronto-Dominion Bank and The Mosaic Company and is the Chairman of the Board of Domtar Corporation. He served on the boards of IPSCO Inc., IMC Global Inc., Canada Life Insurance Company, and Weyerhaeuser Canada Ltd., and was the lead director of the Bank of Canada.

In 2002, he was made an officer of the Order of Canada and in 2009 he was awarded the Saskatchewan Order of Merit.

== Personal life ==
He and his wife Jean have two children, Carol and Donald.
