= Éric Laplante =

Canadian ice hockey player

- Born: December 1, 1979 (age 46) Saint-Maurice, Quebec, Canada
- Height: 6 ft 1 in (185 cm)
- Weight: 220 lb (100 kg; 15 st 10 lb)
- Position: Right wing
- Shot: Left
- Played for: Kentucky Thoroughblades; Cleveland Barons; Long Beach Ice Dogs
- National team: Canada
- NHL draft: 65th overall, 1998; San Jose Sharks
- Playing career: 2000–2006; 2012–2017

Éric Laplante (born December 1, 1979) is a former Canadian ice hockey player who played in the American Hockey League (AHL).

== Playing career ==
Éric Laplante played junior hockey in the Quebec Major Junior Hockey League from 1996 to 2000. He was selected by the San Jose Sharks in the third round of the 1998 NHL entry draft.

He joined the Sharks' farm team, the Kentucky Thoroughblades, for the 2000-01 season. He played in the American Hockey League for three years before returning to Quebec. He was arrested in 2006 in connection to the murder of a drug dealer. A year later he, and an accomplice, pleaded guilty to manslaughter. He was sentenced to nine years in prison.

In September 2012 he was invited to the LNAH’s Jonquière Marquis training camp, and managed to get a place on the team.

On June 9, 2013 he was claimed by the Valleyfield Braves in the expansion draft.

The Laval Predators announced on July 15, 2015, that they had signed him for the upcoming season.

== Personal life ==
In 2007, Éric Laplante and Ninja Elgin were arrested for Manslaughter stemming from an incident in which a drug deal went wrong in January, 2006. The two men were to meet drug dealer Benjamin Lefebvre at a house in nearby Chateauguay, Quebec. The drug deal went wrong and Elgin shot at Lefebvre. Laplante and Elgin pleaded guilty to manslaughter and were sentenced to 11 years in prison.
