= Denis Hamel =

Canadian ice hockey player

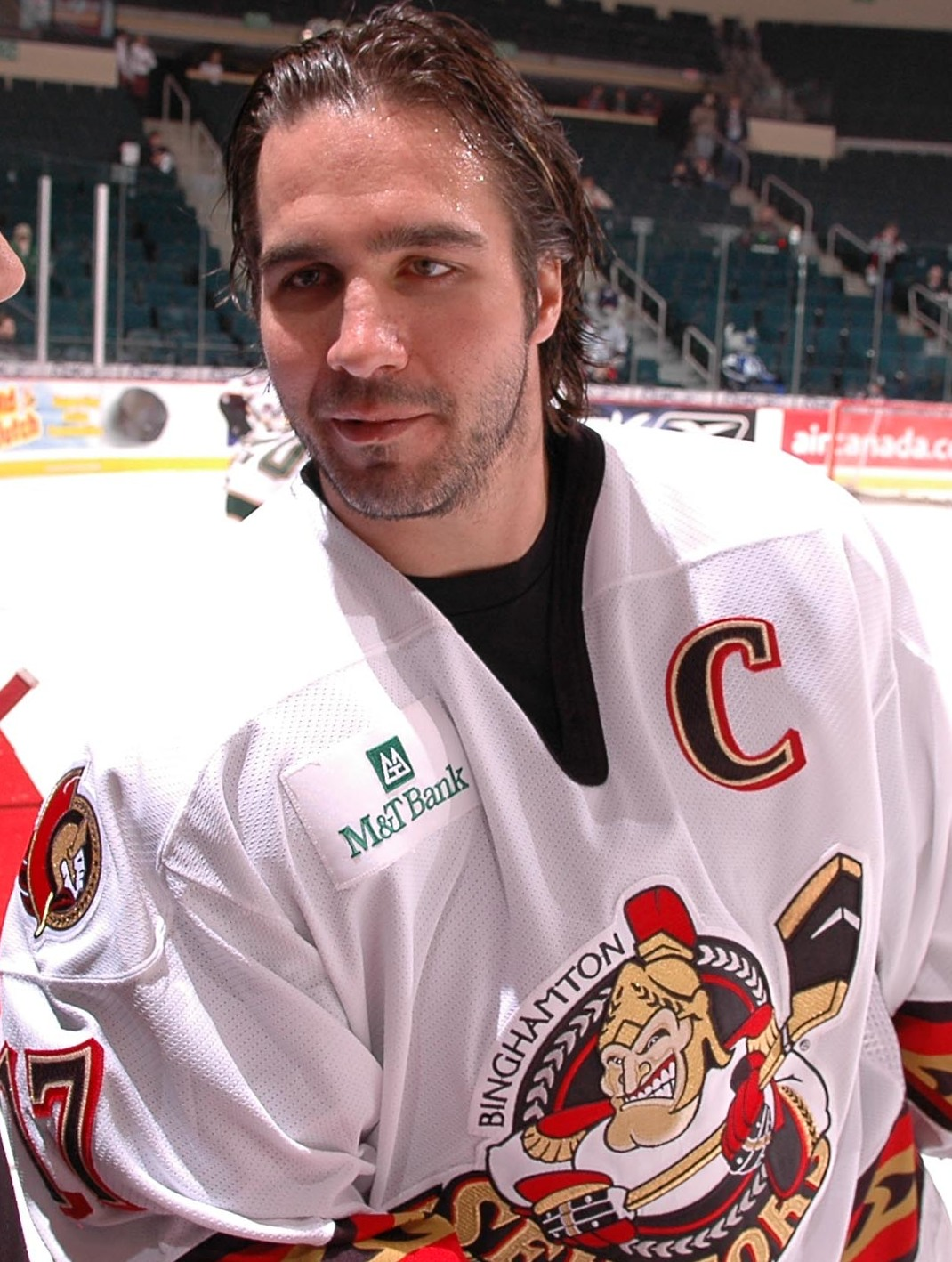
- Hamel with the Binghamton Senators in 2006
- Born: May 10, 1977 (age 48) Lachute, Quebec, Canada
- Height: 6 ft 2 in (188 cm)
- Weight: 198 lb (90 kg; 14 st 2 lb)
- Position: Left wing
- Shot: Left
- Played for: Buffalo Sabres; Ottawa Senators; Atlanta Thrashers; Philadelphia Flyers
- NHL draft: 153rd overall, 1995; St. Louis Blues
- Playing career: 1997–2016

Denis Jean Hamel (born May 10, 1977) is a Canadian former professional ice hockey left winger who last played semi-professionally in the LNAH. A former star in junior, Hamel was not able to translate his scoring success in junior to the National Hockey League (NHL), although he had success at the AHL level, being named an AHL All-Star 3 times. After a serious knee injury in 2000, Hamel's skating speed was diminished and his ability to contribute in the NHL was limited. He was known as a fan favorite with the Binghamton Senators, and is known for his contributions to the community, for which he won the 2008 AHL Man of the Year award.

== Playing career ==
Hamel was drafted 153rd overall by the St. Louis Blues in the 1995 NHL entry draft. Before he graduated from junior hockey, the Blues traded his rights to the Buffalo Sabres. After 3 seasons with the Sabres' AHL team, the Rochester Americans, he played two full seasons with the Sabres in 2000–01 and 2001–02. During the 2000–01 season, he suffered a serious knee injury which limited his play to 41 games and affected his skating speed. He split the 2003–04 season between Buffalo and Rochester. For the 2003–04 season, Hamel signed with the Ottawa Senators organization and played a majority of his games with the Binghamton Senators, Ottawa's AHL affiliate. In the 2005–2006 season, Hamel set the Binghamton team record for most goals in a season with 56. In addition, he was the captain of Binghamton Senators for the 2005–2006 season.

In 2006–07 he returned to the NHL as a regular forward with the Ottawa Senators, and played 43 games with the club. After the Senators suffered injuries to Mike Fisher and Jason Spezza, the club traded for Mike Comrie who would take Hamel's place after the injured players returned. On February 10, 2007, the Atlanta Thrashers claimed Hamel off waivers after Ottawa wanted to assign Hamel to Binghamton. After playing three games for Atlanta, he was placed on waivers and claimed by the Philadelphia Flyers on February 27, 2007, where he finished the season.

On July 6, 2007, Hamel returned to the Senators organization, signing a three-year American Hockey League contract with the Binghamton Senators. He chose to sign with Binghamton, as he intended to have stability in his career. He played the entire 2007–08 season with Binghamton, scoring 32 goals in 67 games. He played there through the 2008-09 and 2009-10 season before being released as a UFA in the 2010 offseason. He was signed by the Adirondack Phantoms on October 30, 2010, one month into the AHL season.

== Personal ==
Hamel married Julie Brisson, a figure skater, on July 18, 2015 in Casselman, Ontario.

== Records ==
Holds the following Binghamton Senators franchise records:

- Most goals in a single season (56 in 2005–06)
- Most career goals and points in franchise history (124 and 236)

== Career statistics ==
			Regular season					Playoffs
Season	Team	League	GP	G	A	Pts	PIM	GP	G	A	Pts	PIM
1993–94	Laval Régents	QMAAA	28	10	11	21	50	—	—	—	—	—
1993–94	Abitibi–Témiscamingue Forestiers	QMAAA	15	5	7	12	29	5	0	3	3	16
1994–95	Chicoutimi Saguenéens	QMJHL	66	15	12	27	155	13	2	0	2	29
1995–96	Chicoutimi Saguenéens	QMJHL	65	40	49	89	199	17	10	14	24	64
1996–97	Chicoutimi Saguenéens	QMJHL	70	50	50	100	339	20	15	10	25	65
1997–98	Rochester Americans	AHL	74	10	15	25	98	4	1	2	3	0
1998–99	Rochester Americans	AHL	74	16	17	33	121	20	3	4	7	10
1999–2000	Rochester Americans	AHL	76	34	24	58	122	21	6	7	13	49
1999–2000	Buffalo Sabres	NHL	3	1	0	1	0	—	—	—	—	—
2000–01	Buffalo Sabres	NHL	41	8	3	11	22	—	—	—	—	—
2001–02	Buffalo Sabres	NHL	61	2	6	8	28	—	—	—	—	—
2002–03	Rochester Americans	AHL	48	27	20	47	64	3	3	2	5	4
2002–03	Buffalo Sabres	NHL	25	2	0	2	17	—	—	—	—	—
2003–04	Binghamton Senators	AHL	78	29	38	67	116	2	0	0	0	2
2003–04	Ottawa Senators	NHL	5	0	0	0	0	—	—	—	—	—
2004–05	Binghamton Senators	AHL	80	39	39	78	75	5	1	0	1	4
2005–06	Binghamton Senators	AHL	77	56	35	91	65	—	—	—	—	—
2005–06	Ottawa Senators	NHL	4	1	0	1	0	—	—	—	—	—
2006–07	Ottawa Senators	NHL	43	4	3	7	10	—	—	—	—	—
2006–07	Atlanta Thrashers	NHL	3	1	0	1	0	—	—	—	—	—
2006–07	Philadelphia Flyers	NHL	7	0	0	0	0	—	—	—	—	—
2007–08	Binghamton Senators	AHL	67	32	23	55	60	—	—	—	—	—
2008–09	Binghamton Senators	AHL	63	25	25	50	36	—	—	—	—	—
2009–10	Binghamton Senators	AHL	73	22	29	51	45	—	—	—	—	—
2010–11	Saguenay Marquis	LNAH	7	6	8	14	2	—	—	—	—	—
2010–11	Adirondack Phantoms	AHL	66	25	25	50	50	—	—	—	—	—
2011–12	Adirondack Phantoms	AHL	74	23	23	46	14	—	—	—	—	—
2012–13	Jonquière Marquis	LNAH	34	26	21	47	6	11	3	9	12	10
2013–14	Jonquière Marquis	LNAH	24	15	15	30	11	1	0	0	0	0
2015–16	Laval Prédateurs	LNAH	4	1	0	1	0	—	—	—	—	—
AHL totals			850	338	313	651	866	55	14	15	29	69
NHL totals			192	19	12	31	77	—	—	—	—	—

== Awards and honours ==
Award	Year
QMJHL
All-Rookie Team	1995
AHL
All-Star Game	2000, 2006, 2008
First All-Star Team	2004
Willie Marshall Award	2005
Yanick Dupre Memorial Award	2008
AHL Hall of Fame	2020
