= Bruce Richardson =

Canadian ice hockey player (born 1977)

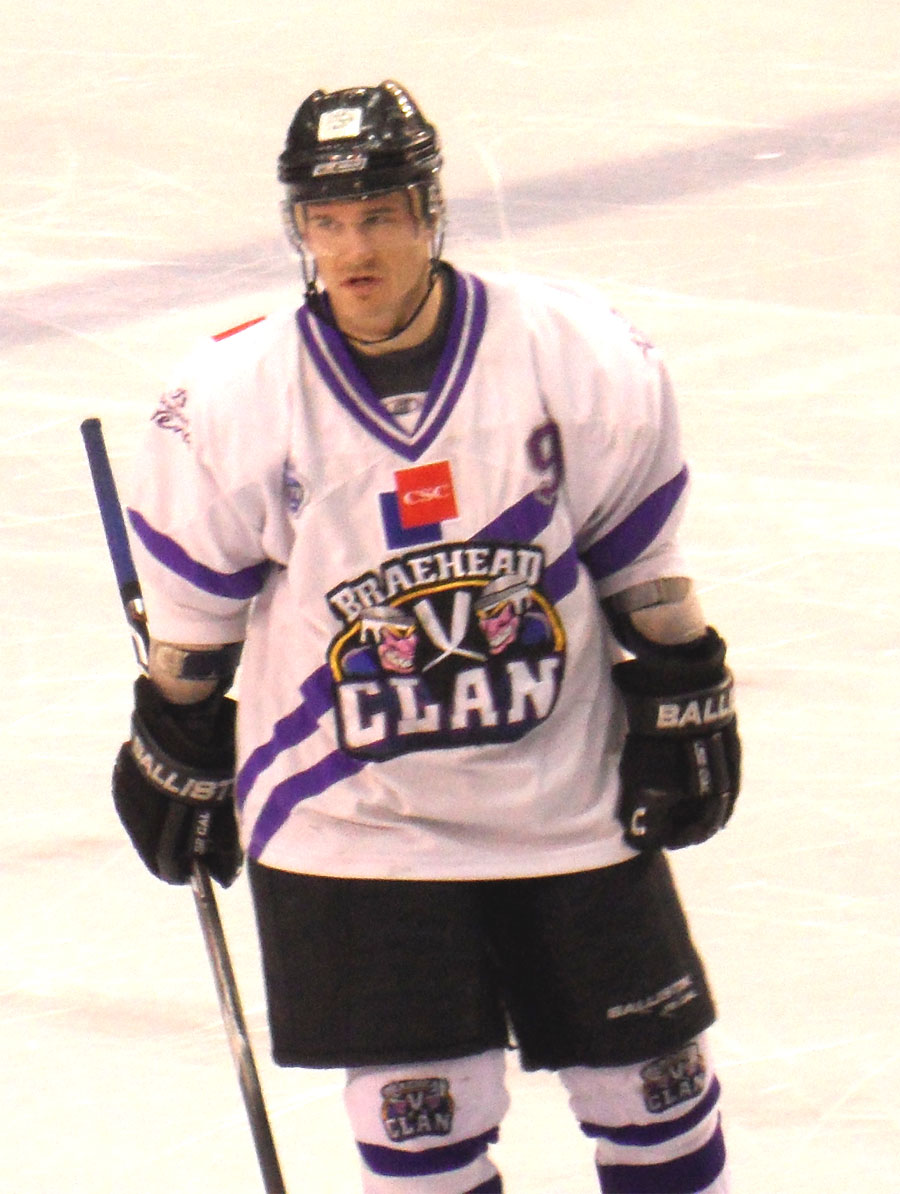
- Born: June 8, 1977 (age 48) Montreal, Quebec, Canada
- Height: 5 ft 9 in (175 cm)
- Weight: 175 lb (79 kg; 12 st 7 lb)
- Position: Centre
- Shot: Left
- Played for: QMJHL; Sherbrooke Faucons; Chicoutimi Saguenéens; AHL; Hershey Bears; Cincinnati Mighty Ducks; Milwaukee Admirals; ECHL; Chesapeake Icebreakers; Louisiana IceGators; Pensacola Ice Pilots; UHL; Quad City Mallards; Danbury Trashers; Fort Wayne Komets; IHL; Manitoba Moose; DEL; Iserlohn Roosters; CHL; Wichita Thunder; EIHL; Nottingham Panthers; Braehead Clan
- Playing career: 1993–2011

Bruce Richardson (born June 8, 1977) is a Canadian former professional ice hockey player best known for his time playing for Braehead Clan and the Nottingham Panthers in the British Elite Ice Hockey League and for the Hershey Bears in the American Hockey League. Richardson was often a favourite with fans wherever he went, due to his aggressive style of play and determination. He was the head coach of the Victoriaville Tigres in the Quebec Major Junior Hockey League from 2014 to 2016 and now coach of Armada Blainville-Boisbriand in the Quebec Major Junior Hockey League

== Playing career ==
=== North America ===
Bruce Richardson started his 18-year playing career in Quebec, with the Sherbrooke Faucons in the QMJHL. He stayed there for 3 and a half years, playing over a hundred games before moving onto the Chicoutimi Saguenéens in the same league.

Most of Richardson's time in North America was spent at the Hershey Bears in Hershey, Pennsylvania. During his first year there he was coached by Bob Hartley, who went on to become a Stanley Cup winning coach with the Colorado Avalanche in 2000-01. He is remembered fondly by the Bears fans, racking up a total of over 150 games in his two spells there, and was named their 'Unsung Hero' for the 1998-99 season. Hershey is also where Richardson met Tim Wedderburn and Jordan Krestanovich, who he became friends with and signed for the Braehead Clan in his first coaching role.

Richardson also played for the Manitoba Moose, in Winnipeg, in the final season of the now defunct IHL.

Despite not ever playing in an NHL game, Richardson did take part in the Detroit Red Wings pre-season in 2001. On September 17, 2001 in a game against the New York Rangers Richardson, wearing the number 68, had a fight with Richard Scott. Richardson also got to take to the ice in Madison Square Garden, home of the New York Rangers, an achievement which he classes as his greatest memory in hockey.

Richardson had a fairly successful season in 2004-05 with the Danbury Trashers in the UHL. The Trashers came second in the Eastern Division, qualifying them for the play-offs. They saw off Adirondack Frostbite, winning 4 games to their 2 in the Quarter-Finals. They then fell to eventual play-off champions Muskegon Fury in the Semi-Finals, winning only 1 game to their 4. Richardson was the Thrashers overall top point scorer for the season, with 25 goals and 62 assists in the regular season and a further 2 goals and 6 assists in the play-offs.

During his time playing hockey in North America, Richardson played alongside many future NHL players. These included Eric Perrin, Raitis Ivanans, Jason Williams, Jordan Krestanovich and many others. It is often suggested that had Bruce been slightly bigger, he may have made it there himself.

Richardson was sometimes considered injury-prone, due to suffering some major injuries in his career. He tore a knee ligament in 2000, and a broken left eye socket in 2002. This was often attributed to the fact that Bruce played with such aggression and determination, and was willing to put his body on the line for his team.

=== Germany ===
Richardson continued to play for many different clubs all across North America until 2005, when Richardson realised that his dream of playing in the NHL may be over. With this in mind, he took on a new challenge and joined the Iserlohn Roosters in the German Hockey League, after a major summer restructuring that saw twelve players leave the club. The Roosters signed him to lead their fourth line, which included two younger players. They wanted Richardson to help their development with his experience.

=== Return to North America ===
Richardson returned to North America after just one season in Germany, to become a player/assistant Coach with the Fort Wayne Komets in the UHL. This was Richardson's first coaching job, which would become a passion of his in the years to come. Upon arriving at the Fort Wayne he had praise heaped on him by a former Komet, Jeff Worlton:

He's one of the nicest hockey guys I’ve ever met in my life, but he's tough as nails. He’ll do anything you need for the team. He’ll fight anybody. I’ve seen him fight guys my size. The only reason he didn’t make it to the show was because of his size.

Richardson eventually helped lead the Komets to the Semi-Finals of the UHL playoffs in what could be considered a fairly successful season. In the 2007/8 season, he left Fort Wayne and moved to Wichita, Kansas, to return to a normal playing role at the Wichita Thunder. He was Wichita's top point scorer for the season, with 57. It was here that he would meet Kyle Bruce, a Canadian winger who he eventually signed for Braehead Clan in his first coaching role.

=== United Kingdom ===
In 2008, Richardson made his second trip to Europe in his career, this time to Britain to become a player/assistant coach at the Nottingham Panthers in the Elite Ice Hockey League under Corey Neilson. He quickly became a fan favourite at the Panthers, winning the clubs 'Team Spirit Award' and was rewarded by being re-signed for a second season. In the 2009-10 season he won the Challenge Cup with Nottingham. This was Richardson's first and only major career trophy. He continued to rack up personal awards too, being named Nottingham's most entertaining player of the year. He was also shortlisted for the Elite League's most entertaining player of the year award.

On May 5, 2010, it was announced that Richardson was to become player/coach of the newly formed, Glasgow based Braehead Clan for their first season in Elite League Ice Hockey. Richardson was given full control to build his own team, his captain being former team-mate at the Nottingham Panthers, Brendan Cook. Other ex team-mates of his Kyle Bruce, Tim Wedderburn and Jordan Krestanovic were also key members of his squad. Richardson led his team to a 5th-place finish in the Elite League, ahead of long-time established Coventry Blaze and Hull Stingrays, an impressive feat for a team in its debut season. Richardson made his fair contribution on the ice also, with 55 points, making him the Clan's 3rd top point scorer for the season. Braehead also won their first silverware, the Aladdin Cup, under Richardson. They defeated his former club, the Nottingham Panthers, in the final. The fifth-place finish qualified Braehead for the play-offs and this, coupled with the Aladdin Cup win, earned Richardson the Ice Hockey Journalist's Elite League Coach of the Year Award. In the play-offs, Braehead were up against the Nottingham Panthers, Richardson's old club. In the first game at home, in front of a Clan record home crowd of 2506 in Braehead Arena, Richardson scored a 3rd period goal to put the Clan into the lead 4-3, but the Panthers fought back and eventually won the game 5-4. The Panthers then cruised past Braehead in the second game 3-0, which was to be Richardson's last game in charge of the Clan.

Despite having a great connection with the fans in Glasgow, in June 2011, Bruce left the Clan to pursue a coaching career in North America. In a farewell message Richardson said:

I often spoke to the fans about my goals and ambitions so most of you will know that my main goal in my career was to move up the coaching ranks. After talking to many high-end people in the world of hockey, they suggested to me that I needed to come back to North America and get my name out there. Many coaches have started their careers in this league.

Another factor which pushed me to make this decision was my family. For the last 16-years we have been moving across the world and my wife and kids have always been there to support me. When the opportunity to coach here in Canada came about, and the chance to stay in my own home without uprooting my family, I just couldn’t say no.

I hope the fans understand my decision and will respect it. I will always have Braehead in my heart, and I will always remember the fans and how they helped me over this past year.

Although he never announced this as his retirement, Richardson appeared to have redirected his focus on gaining experience on becoming a successful coach.

== Coaching career ==
Richardson took the role of player-coach for the Braehead Clan in the 2010/11 season. It was announced on Wednesday, May 5, 2010 that he would take the role after ex-Coventry star Adam Calder apparently walked out on the Clan.

After leaving the Braehead Clan as Player/Coach in 2011, he moved to Quebec to coach the Chateauguay Patriotes Midget AAA Hockey club. He made this move in the hope that he could use the Chateauguay Patriotes as a stepping stone to eventually coaching in the NHL.

On August 17, 2011, Richardson led his team to victory in his first match as coach with a 4-1 home win over Lac St-Louis. This kicked off a four-game winning streak, which was followed by some very poor form in the league.

== Career statistics ==
			Regular season					Playoffs
Season	Team	League	GP	G	A	Pts	PIM	GP	G	A	Pts	PIM
1993-94	Sherbrooke Faucons	QMJHL	3	0	1	1	—	7	0	0	0	6
1994-95	Sherbrooke Faucons	QMJHL	32	1	13	14	25	4	0	1	1	0
1995-96	Sherbrooke Faucons	QMJHL	67	19	42	71	206	7	0	2	2	25
1996-97	Sherbrooke Faucons	QMJHL	42	14	22	36	165	-	-	-	-	-
1996-97	Chicoutimi Saguenéens	QMJHL	21	5	3	8	134	21	7	9	16	84
1997-98	Hershey Bears	AHL	10	0	0	0	87	-	-	-	-	-
1997-98	Chesapeake Icebreakers	ECHL	2	0	0	0	26	-	-	-	-	-
1997-98	Chicoutimi Saguenéens	QMJHL	43	7	20	27	264	6	2	4	6	11
1998-99	Hershey Bears	AHL	44	4	7	11	132	3	0	0	0	15
1998-99	Quad City Mallards	UHL	16	4	7	11	75	-	-	-	-	-
1999-00	Hershey Bears	AHL	17	2	2	4	61	-	-	-	-	-
1999-00	Pensacola Ice Pilots	ECHL	29	7	13	20	83	3	0	2	2	8
2000-01	Hershey Bears	AHL	4	0	1	1	4	-	-	-	-	-
2000-01	Louisiana IceGators	ECHL	22	10	21	31	83	-	-	-	-	-
2000-01	Manitoba Moose	IHL	51	8	9	17	131	12	0	2	2	26
2001-02	Cincinnati Mighty Ducks	AHL	57	5	12	17	113	3	1	1	2	4
2002-03	Louisiana IceGators	ECHL	40	19	42	61	131	-	-	-	-	-
2002-03	Milwaukee Admirals	AHL	4	3	0	3	2	-	-	-	-	-
2002-03	Hershey Bears	AHL	33	4	4	8	60	5	1	0	1	4
2003-04	Hershey Bears	AHL	51	2	3	5	89	-	-	-	-	-
2003-04	Louisiana IceGators	ECHL	7	1	5	6	18	9	4	5	9	11
2004-05	Danbury Trashers	UHL	76	25	62	87	138	11	2	6	8	12
2005-06	Iserlohn Roosters	DEL	27	0	10	10	24	-	-	-	-	-
2006-07	Fort Wayne Komets	UHL	57	15	32	47	135	10	0	4	4	4
2007-08	Wichita Thunder	CHL	62	16	41	57	88	-	-	-	-	-
2008-09	Nottingham Panthers	EIHL	54	12	46	58	119	4	2	0	2	6
2009-10	Nottingham Panthers	EIHL	51	14	28	52	107	3	1	3	4	4
2010-11	Braehead Clan	EIHL	54	15	40	55	112	2	1	0	1	4
