= Robert Guertin Centre =

Arena in Gatineau, Quebec, Canada

Coordinates: 45°26′3″N 75°43′29″W

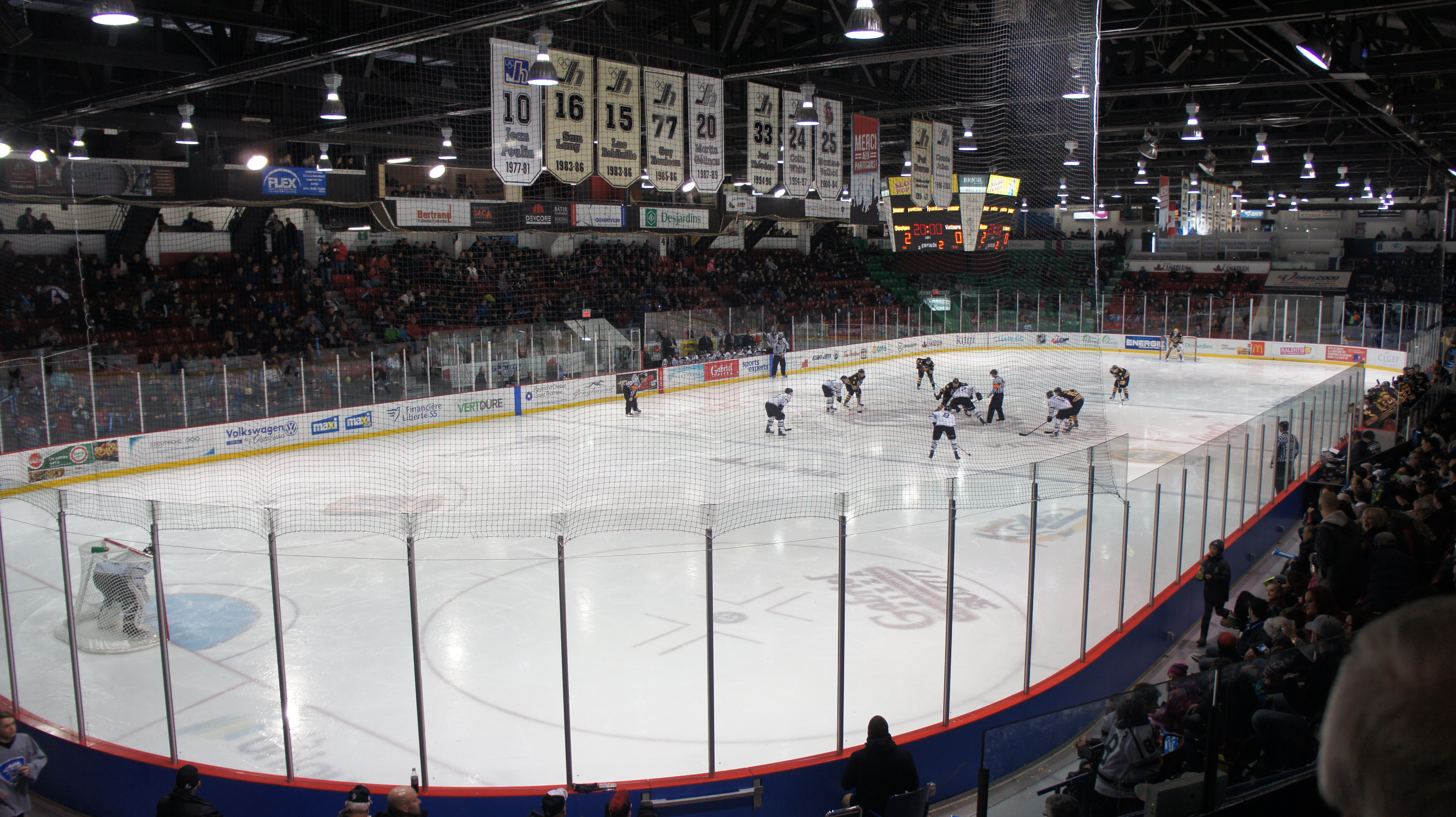
- Interactive map of Robert Guertin Centre
- Former names: Hull Arena, Robert Guertin Arena
- Address: 125, rue de Carillon
- Location: Gatineau, Quebec, Canada
- Owner: City of Gatineau
- Operator: City of Gatineau
- Capacity: Hockey: 4,000 (total); 3,196 (seated)

Construction
- Opened: 1952

Tenants
- Gatineau Olympiques (QMJHL) (2003–2021); Gatineau Hull-Volants (NCJHL) 2009–2021); Hull Olympiques (QMJHL) (1976–2003); Hull Festivals (CJAHL/QMJHL) (1970–1976); Hull Hawks (OHDJHL) (1969–1970); Ottawa 67's (OHL) (1967–1968); Ottawa-Hull Canadiens (1957–1959, 1960–1961)

The Robert Guertin Centre ("The Bob") (French: Centre Robert Guertin) (formerly Robert Guertin Arena and Hull Arena) was a multi-purpose arena in the Hull sector of Gatineau, Quebec, with a capacity of 4,000 capacity (3,196 seated). It was built in 1957 and demolished in 2024.

The original tenant hockey team was the Ottawa-Hull Canadiens from 1957 to 1961, until the team relocated to become the Montreal Junior Canadiens. The Ottawa-Hull Canadiens hosted the 1958 Memorial Cup between the Hull Arena and the Ottawa Auditorium across the river. The Canadiens defeated the Regina Pats four games to two to win the Memorial Cup. The Hull Arena hosted various teams in the Ottawa-Hull District Junior Hockey League during the 1960s, and briefly hosted the Ottawa 67's in 1967 and 1968, while the Ottawa Civic Centre was under construction. Since 1973, the arena has been home to Quebec Major Junior Hockey League teams. The Hull Festivals joined the QMJHL in 1973, and later became known as the Hull Olympiques in 1976, and finally the Gatineau Olympiques in 2003.

The Hull arena hosted the 1982 Memorial Cup. The Gatineau Olympiques won the 1997 Memorial Cup on home ice, defeating the Lethbridge Hurricanes. The arena is also the site of an international midget hockey tournament held every January.

== Replacement ==
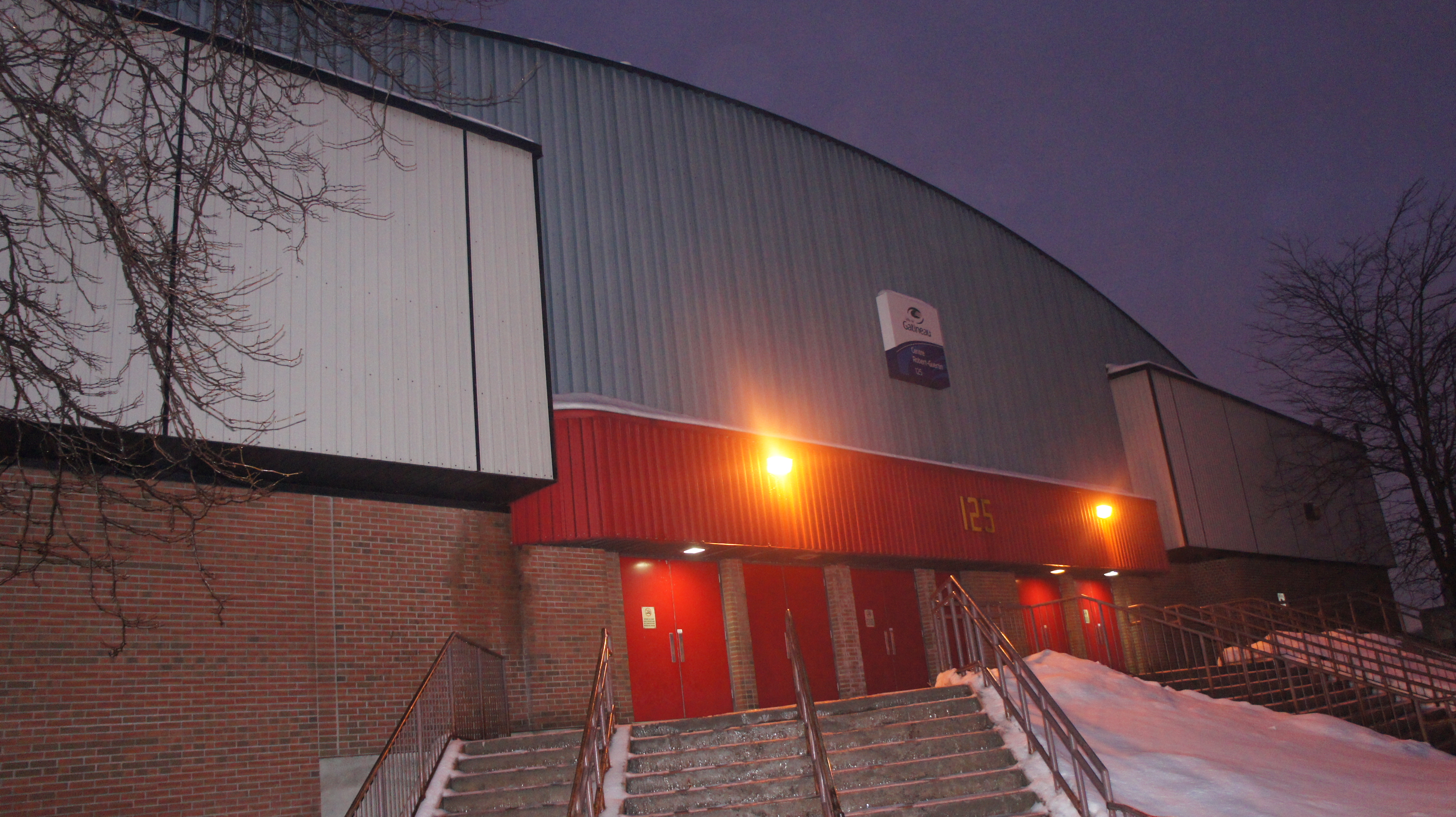
Exterior

In 2001, team owners of the Olympiques first discussed the idea of playing at a new rink with a larger capacity. Renovations were made to the arena in 2003 and 2004 that slightly reduced the number of seats due to safety reasons. On May 25, 2011, city council announced that a new 5,000 seat arena would be built on the same site, and the old arena would be demolished. The estimated cost of the new arena was to be $63 million, but the project never went further.

On February 22, 2017, city council approved a new 4,000 seat arena and recreation complex with three community rinks. Cost is estimated at $79 million. The new arena, Slush Puppie Centre, located east of downtown, was opened in August 2021.
