= Peter Worrell =

Canadian ice hockey player (born 1977)

- Born: August 18, 1977 (age 49) Pierrefonds, Quebec, Canada
- Height: 6 ft 7 in (201 cm)
- Weight: 250 lb (113 kg; 17 st 12 lb)
- Position: Left wing
- Shot: Left
- Played for: Florida Panthers; Colorado Avalanche
- NHL draft: 166th overall, 1995; Florida Panthers
- Playing career: 1997–2006

Peter J. Worrell (born August 18, 1977) is a Canadian former professional ice hockey player. Worrell played seven seasons in the National Hockey League (NHL) for the Florida Panthers and the Colorado Avalanche. During that time he was considered one of the most feared enforcers in the game, leading the major junior leagues in penalty minutes in 1996–97, as well as the NHL in 2001–02. In 2018 he was hired as an assistant coach by the Fayetteville Marksmen of the Southern Professional Hockey League (SPHL)

== Career ==
=== Amateur career ===
As a youth, Worrell played in the 1991 Quebec International Pee-Wee Hockey Tournament with a minor ice hockey team from the North Shore of Montreal.

Worrell was a member of the Hull Olympiques for his three junior seasons. During these three seasons Worrell was part of two QMJHL championship teams (1994–95 and 1996-97) and part of the 1997 Memorial Cup winning team. Worrell totaled 464 PIMs during the 1995-96 season, which was the fifth highest total in league history. Worrell also scored 23 goals and 36 assists for a total of 59 points in 63 games that same season. The following season, Worrell's final in junior, he improved his point total to 63 in 62 games, despite his goals scoring decreasing to 17. Worrell added a goal and 3 assists in his four Memorial Cup games. By the end of his junior career Worrell had collected close to 1,200 penalty minutes while collecting 131 points.

=== Professional career ===
Worrell was selected by the Florida Panthers in the 7th round, 166th overall, in the 1995 NHL entry draft. Following his final season with the Olympiques Worrell began his pro career in 1997 with the Beast of New Haven in the American Hockey League. The 1997-98 season also saw Worrell make his NHL debut with the Panthers, playing in 19 games, accumulating 153 PIMs, but failing to register a single point. On February 8, 1999, Worrell scored his first NHL goal in a game vs. the St. Louis Blues. During the 1999–2000 season, Worrell missed 34 games with a knee injury, but managed to match his 9 points from the previous year. The season also saw Worrell become involved in a notorious incident with New Jersey Devils defenseman Scott Niedermayer. After a collision along the boards where Worrell appeared to elbow Niedermayer in the face, Niedermayer hit Worrell on the top of the helmet with his stick. A scrum ensued and as Worrell was being escorted off the ice by the referees, he made throat-slashing gestures to the Devils bench. Niedermayer was suspended 10 games (the Devils 9 final regular season games and their first playoff game). Worrell missed six games after suffering a concussion.

On July 18, 2003, he was traded from the Florida Panthers along with a 2nd-round pick in the 2004 draft to Colorado Avalanche for Eric Messier and Václav Nedorost. Worrell missed the first 27 games of the season with another knee injury. Worrell made his Avalanche debut on December 11, 2003; the game marked his first in eight months. Worrell played in 49 games for Colorado collecting 3 goals and an assist, it was his lowest NHL point total, yet marked the first time that he was a plus player ending the season with a plus-2 rating.

Following his first season with the Avalanche the NHL lockout caused the cancellation of the 2004–05 NHL season. Worrell did not play professionally during the lockout like many other NHLers and considered himself retired. However, once the NHL returned Worrell decided that he would attempt to make a comeback and signed with the New York Rangers. The Rangers assigned first to the Hartford Wolfpack in the AHL but never played a game for them. Hartford sent Worrell to the Charlotte Checkers of the ECHL to work on his conditioning. Worrell played 37 games for Charlotte; it was the last time he played professionally.

=== Post-playing career ===
On May 18, 2010, it was announced that Worrell agreed to become the head coach for the Florida Atlantic University hockey club team. He also coached North Broward Preparatory School's varsity ice hockey team, located in Coconut Creek, Florida. Worrell currently works for the Fayetteville Marksmen as an assistant coach.

== Facing racism ==
Worrell was born in Canada to Barbadian parents. During his career Worrell has often had to deal with racism; beginning in junior, Worrell had spectators throw bananas at him while he was in the penalty box, a fan with a bullhorn yelled out "go back to Africa", and someone once brought a sign that read "6-foot-6 of pure shit go back to hell". While playing the Washington Capitals in a 1997 game Craig Berube called Worrell a "monkey". Berube received a one-game suspension from the league for his actions. In a 1998 game vs. the Tampa Bay Lightning, Darcy Tucker and Sandy McCarthy allegedly taunted Worrell by making ape like gestures to him while all three were in their respective penalty boxes. Following the game Tucker and Worrell got into an argument when Tucker, according to a Panthers staff member, called Worrell a "big ape". The NHL investigated the incident, reviewing videotape, interviewed players and employees of both teams, off-ice and on-ice officials and arena and security personnel. The NHL concluded that there was "insufficient evidence" to support the claims. Also in 1998 Flyers forward Chris Gratton was alleged to have used a racial slur against Worrell following a scuffle in the game. A newspaper reporter claimed that he read Gratton's lips and printed the story. Gratton denied using the slur telling reporters "We said some stuff behind the net.... What I said was, Learn how to play the game, basically, with a couple of words I don't want to use." Worrell helped to clear Gratton's name when he told the NHL that he never heard the slur.

== Legal troubles ==
Worrell had his license suspended twice because of two convictions for drunken driving. In June 2002, he was arrested for DUI, leaving the scene of an accident and criminal mischief for kicking a police car's window off its track. He pleaded no contest and was sentenced to 10 days in jail for those incidents.

== Career statistics ==
Bold indicates led league

			Regular season					Playoffs
Season	Team	League	GP	G	A	Pts	PIM	GP	G	A	Pts	PIM
1993–94	Lac St–Louis Lions	QMAAA	1	0	0	0	0	1	0	0	0	0
1994–95	Hull Olympiques	QMJHL	56	1	8	9	243	21	0	1	1	91
1995–96	Hull Olympiques	QMJHL	63	23	36	59	464	18	11	8	19	81
1996–97	Hull Olympiques	QMJHL	62	17	46	63	**495**	14	3	13	16	83
1997–98	Florida Panthers	NHL	19	0	0	0	153	—	—	—	—	—
1997–98	Beast of New Haven	AHL	50	15	12	27	309	1	0	1	1	6
1998–99	Florida Panthers	NHL	62	4	5	9	258	—	—	—	—	—
1998–99	Beast of New Haven	AHL	10	3	1	4	65	—	—	—	—	—
1999–2000	Florida Panthers	NHL	48	3	6	9	169	4	1	0	1	8
2000–01	Florida Panthers	NHL	71	3	7	10	248	—	—	—	—	—
2001–02	Florida Panthers	NHL	79	4	5	9	**354**	—	—	—	—	—
2002–03	Florida Panthers	NHL	63	2	3	5	193	—	—	—	—	—
2003–04	Colorado Avalanche	NHL	49	3	1	4	179	—	—	—	—	—
2005–06	Charlotte Checkers	ECHL	37	7	8	15	139	—	—	—	—	—
NHL totals			391	19	27	46	1554	4	1	0	1	8

== See also ==
- List of black NHL players
