= Christian Bronsard =

German-born Canadian ice hockey player

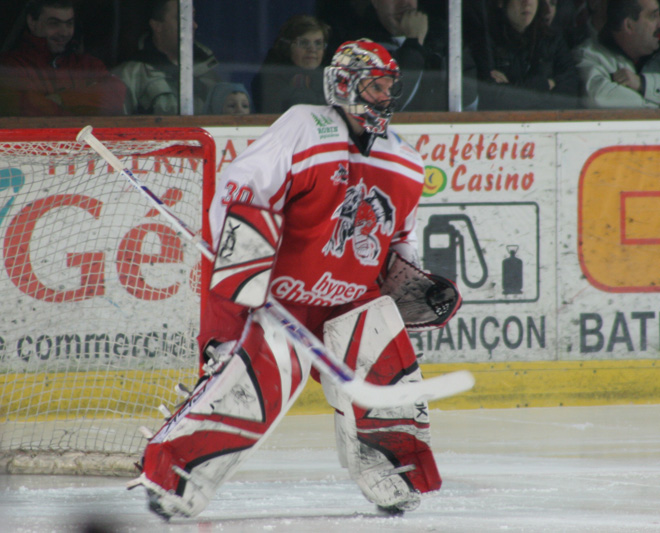
- Bronsard with the Diables Rouges de Briançon in 2006
- Born: December 25, 1977 (age 48) Lahr, West Germany
- Height: 5 ft 7 in (170 cm)
- Weight: 165 lb (75 kg; 11 st 11 lb)
- Position: Goaltender
- Caught: Right
- Played for: AHL; Syracuse Crunch; Quebec Citadelles; ECHL; Tallahassee Tiger Sharks; Baton Rouge Kingfish; KHL; Sibir Novosibirsk
- National team: Canada
- NHL draft: Undrafted
- Playing career: 1998–2008

Christian Bronsard (born December 25, 1977) is a German-born Canadian former professional ice hockey goaltender. Bronsard played the 1997–98 season with the Canada men's national ice hockey team.

On October 30, 1999, while playing against Rochester, Bronsard scored a goal for the Syracuse Crunch to become only the fourth goaltender in American Hockey League history and first and only goalie in Crunch history to record a goal.

== Awards and honours ==
Award	Year
Memorial Cup All-Star Team	1997
Hap Emms Memorial Trophy – Outstanding Goaltender at the Memorial Cup	1997

Preceded by Mathieu Garon	Winner of the Raymond Lagacé Trophy; 1996–97	Succeeded by Alexei Tezikov
