= 1996 Memorial Cup =

Canadian junior men's ice hockey championship

1996 Chrysler Memorial Cup
Tournament details
- Venue(s): Peterborough Memorial Centre; Peterborough, Ontario
- Dates: May 11–19, 1996
- Teams: 4
- Host team: Peterborough Petes (OHL)
- TV partner: TSN

Final positions
- Champions: Granby Prédateurs (QMJHL) (1st title)

Tournament statistics
- Games played: 8

The Memorial Cup trophy

The 1996 Memorial Cup occurred May 11–19 at the Peterborough Memorial Centre in Peterborough, Ontario. It was the 78th annual Memorial Cup competition and determined the major junior ice hockey champion of the Canadian Hockey League (CHL). Participating teams were the host Peterborough Petes, who were also the champions of the Ontario Hockey League, as well as the OHL runner-up Guelph Storm, and the winners of the Quebec Major Junior Hockey League and Western Hockey League, which were the Granby Prédateurs and the Brandon Wheat Kings. Granby won their first Memorial Cup, over Peterborough. It was the first time since 1971 that a team from the province of Quebec won the Cup.

Granby faced the Peterborough Petes for the cup — on Peterborough ice. Inside the old arena, it climbed to a stifling 27 C during play, and fog rising from the ice made it hard for players to see. Maintenance crews came often to remove pooling water. Granby still managed a 4–0 victory, which brought the cup back to Quebec for the first time since 1971.

== Round-robin standings ==
Pos	Team	Pld	W	L	GF	GA	
1	Granby Prédateurs (QMJHL)	3	2	1	14	7	Advanced directly to the championship game
2	Brandon Wheat Kings (WHL)	3	2	1	6	6	Advanced to the semifinal game
3	Peterborough Petes (OHL and host)	3	2	1	10	7	Advanced to the semifinal game
4	Guelph Storm (OHL rep.)	3	0	3	2	12	

== Scores ==
Round-robin

- May 11 Granby 8-0 Guelph
- May 12 Brandon 2-1 Guelph
- May 12 Peterborough 6-3 Granby
- May 14 Brandon 3-2 Peterborough (OT)
- May 15 Granby 3-1 Brandon
- May 16 Peterborough 2-1 Guelph

Semi-final

- May 18 Peterborough 4-3 Brandon

Final

- May 19 Granby 4-0 Peterborough

=== Winning roster ===
1995-96 Granby Predateurs
Goaltenders: 29 – Frederic Deschenes; 34 – Frederic Henry	Defencemen: 5 – Jimmy Drolet; 10 – Samy Nasreddine; 22 – Francis Bouillon; 28 – Bard Sorlie; 36 – Jonathan Desroches; 37 – Christian Lefebvre; 44 – Jason Doig	Wingers: 9 – Michel Massie; 16 – Philippe Audet; 17 – Philippe Grondin; 20 – Daniel Goneau; 21 – Kevin Bourque; 26 – Jean-Francois Brunelle; 27 – Georges Laraque; 33 – Jean-Francois Tremblay; 55 – Xavier Delisle	Centres: 18 – Todd Row; 24 – David Brosseau; 25 – Benoit Gratton; 32 – Martin Chouinard; Coach: Michel Therrien; General Manager: Jean-Claude Morrissette

== Award winners ==
- Stafford Smythe Memorial Trophy (MVP): Cameron Mann, Peterborough
- George Parsons Trophy (Sportsmanship): Mike Williams, Peterborough
- Hap Emms Memorial Trophy (Goaltender): Frederic Deschenes, Granby
- Ed Chynoweth Trophy (Top Scorer): Philippe Audet, Granby

All-star team

- Goal: Frederic Deschenes, Granby
- Defence: Wade Redden, Brandon; Jason Doig, Granby
- Centre: Xavier Delisle, Granby
- Left wing: Philippe Audet, Granby
- Right wing: Cameron Mann, Peterborough
