= Francis Bouillon =

American ice hockey player (born 1975)

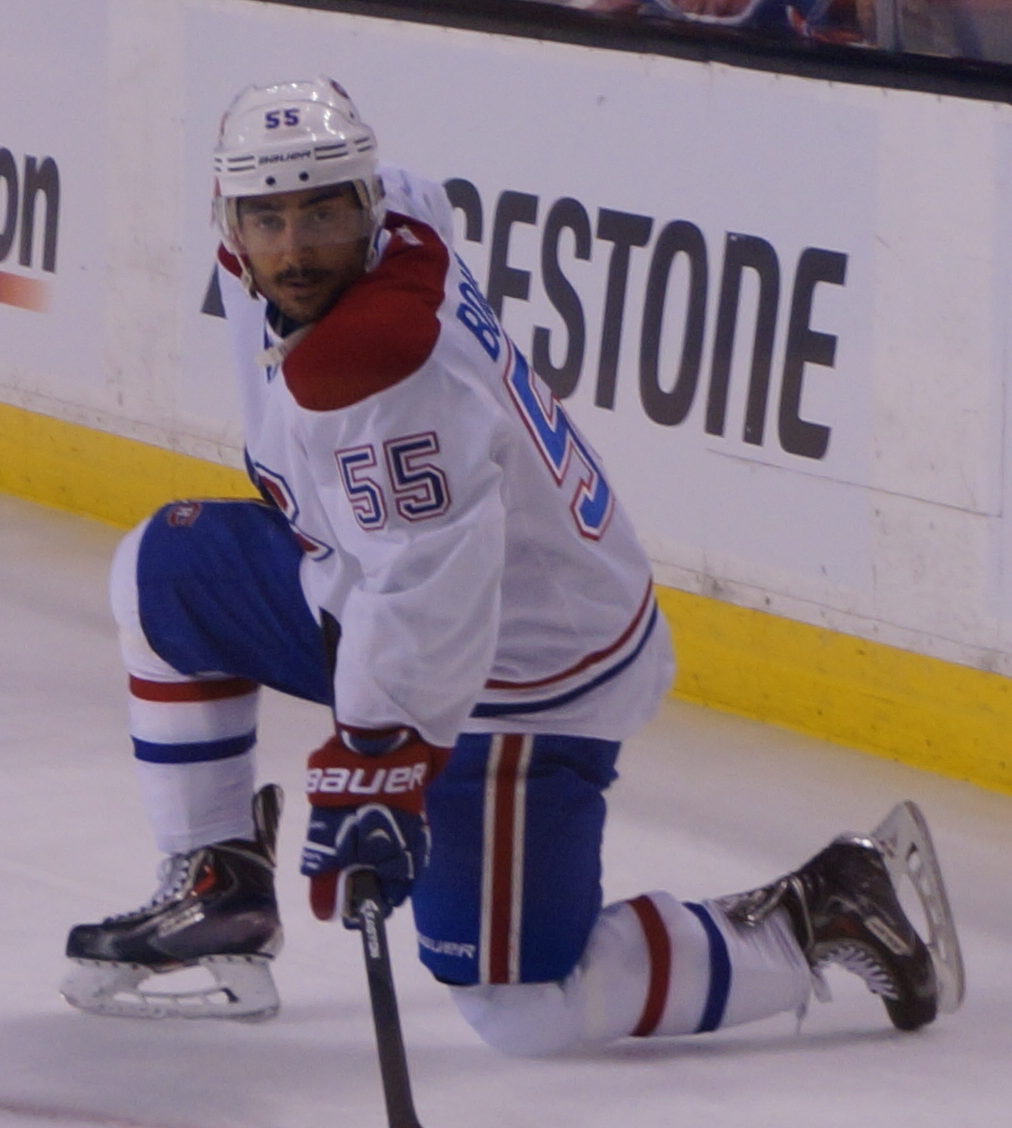
- Bouillon playing for the Montreal Canadiens in 2014
- Born: October 17, 1975 (age 50) New York City, U.S.
- Height: 5 ft 8 in (173 cm)
- Weight: 200 lb (91 kg; 14 st 4 lb)
- Position: Defense
- Shot: Left
- Played for: Montreal Canadiens; Nashville Predators; Leksands IF; HC Ambrì-Piotta
- National team: United States
- NHL draft: Undrafted
- Playing career: 1996–2015

Francis Joseph Bouillon (born October 17, 1975) is an American former professional ice hockey defenseman who played 14 seasons in the National Hockey League (NHL) for the Montreal Canadiens and Nashville Predators. He also played a season for HC Ambrì-Piotta in the National League A (NLA), the top-tier league in Switzerland. He is currently a Development Coach for the Montreal Canadiens.

== Early life ==
Bouillon was born in New York City to a Haitian father and a French Canadian mother. Bouillon moved to Quebec City, Quebec with his mother when he was only 3 years old. He played Junior hockey in the Quebec Major Junior Hockey League with the Laval Titans and the Granby Predateurs. He was Granby's captain when they won the 1996 Memorial Cup.

== Playing career ==
Francis made his professional debut the 1996–97 season in the ECHL with the Wheeling Nailers and played the following season in the IHL with the Quebec Rafales before he was signed as a free agent to an NHL contract by the Montreal Canadiens in 1998.

He played the next 11 seasons, the majority of his career (except for a short stint with the Predators in 2002–03) within the Canadiens organization. At 5'8" and 194 lbs, Bouillon is considered small for an NHL defenseman but is never one to shy away from physical play. According to Pierre Houde, he is one of the strongest players in the NHL as shown by official physical tests.

On September 30, 2009, just prior to the 2009–10 season, Bouillon was signed to a one-year contract as a late inclusion to the Nashville Predators after joining the team on a tryout for training camp. In returning to the Predators after an initial four-game stint in 2002, Bouillon established himself within the Predators defense as a stay-at-home defenseman to appear in 81 games, missing only a single game, for 3 goals and 11 points. On June 18, 2010, he signed a two-year extension to remain with the Predators.

On July 1, 2012, Bouillon signed a one-year deal worth $1.5 million with the Montreal Canadiens. His play during that season earned him a one-year extension with the team. Following the 2013–14 season, the Canadiens declined to offer Bouillon a contract and on July 1, 2014, he became an unrestricted free agent. Bouillon attended the Canadiens' training camp for the 2014–15 season on a tryout, but was released by the team on October 6, 2014. On October 14, 2014, he signed with HC Ambrì-Piotta in the Swiss National League A.

He announced his retirement on September 25, 2015.

== Personal life ==
Bouillon is married with two sons.

== Career statistics ==
=== Regular season and playoffs ===
			Regular season					Playoffs
Season	Team	League	GP	G	A	Pts	PIM	GP	G	A	Pts	PIM
1991–92	Montreal–Bourassa	QMAAA	42	2	5	7	28	9	1	0	1	6
1992–93	Laval Titan	QMJHL	46	0	7	7	45	—	—	—	—	—
1993–94	Laval Titan	QMJHL	68	3	15	18	129	—	—	—	—	—
1994–95	Laval Titan Collège Français	QMJHL	72	8	25	33	115	20	3	11	14	21
1995–96	Granby Predateurs	QMJHL	68	11	35	46	156	21	2	12	14	30
1996–97	Wheeling Nailers	ECHL	69	10	32	42	77	3	0	2	2	10
1997–98	Quebec Rafales	IHL	71	8	27	35	76	—	—	—	—	—
1998–99	Fredericton Canadiens	AHL	79	19	35	54	174	5	2	1	3	0
1999–00	Montreal Canadiens	NHL	74	3	13	16	38	—	—	—	—	—
2000–01	Quebec Citadelles	AHL	4	0	0	0	0	—	—	—	—	—
2000–01	Montreal Canadiens	NHL	29	0	6	6	26	—	—	—	—	—
2001–02	Quebec Citadelles	AHL	38	8	14	22	30	—	—	—	—	—
2001–02	Montreal Canadiens	NHL	28	0	5	5	33	—	—	—	—	—
2002–03	Nashville Predators	NHL	4	0	0	0	2	—	—	—	—	—
2002–03	Hamilton Bulldogs	AHL	29	1	12	13	31	—	—	—	—	—
2002–03	Montreal Canadiens	NHL	20	3	1	4	2	—	—	—	—	—
2003–04	Montreal Canadiens	NHL	73	2	16	18	70	11	0	0	0	7
2004–05	Leksands IF	SWE–2	21	6	12	18	34	—	—	—	—	—
2005–06	Montreal Canadiens	NHL	67	3	19	22	34	6	1	2	3	10
2006–07	Montreal Canadiens	NHL	62	3	11	14	52	—	—	—	—	—
2007–08	Montreal Canadiens	NHL	74	2	6	8	61	7	1	2	3	4
2008–09	Montreal Canadiens	NHL	54	5	4	9	53	1	0	0	0	0
2009–10	Nashville Predators	NHL	81	3	8	11	50	6	0	0	0	6
2010–11	Nashville Predators	NHL	44	1	9	10	27	—	—	—	—	—
2011–12	Nashville Predators	NHL	66	4	7	11	33	10	0	3	3	2
2012–13	Montreal Canadiens	NHL	48	1	8	9	21	5	0	0	0	17
2013–14	Montreal Canadiens	NHL	52	2	4	6	34	9	2	0	2	4
2014–15	HC Ambrì–Piotta	NLA	31	0	11	11	30	—	—	—	—	—
NHL totals			776	32	117	149	536	55	4	7	11	50

=== International ===
Year	Team	Event	Result	GP	G	A	Pts	PIM
2003	United States	WC	13th	6	0	1	1	0
Senior totals				6	0	1	1	0

== See also ==
- List of Black ice hockey players
