= Italian Ice Sports Federation =

Italian governing body for ice sports

- Sport: Ice Sports
- Abbreviation: FISG
- Founded: September 1926; 99 years ago
- Affiliation: ISU, IIHF, WCF
- Headquarters: Milan
- President: Andrea Gios
- Replaced: Federazione Italiana Sport Invernali (FISI)

Official website
- www.fisg.it

The Italian Ice Sports Federation (Italian: Federazione Italiana Sport del Ghiaccio; FISG), is the governing body for ice sports in Italy. It was founded in September 1926 to promote the practice of winter sports on ice and to coordinate events. The FISG is a member of a number of international sports organizations including the International Ice Hockey Federation (IIHF) and the International Skating Union (ISU). The headquarter is in Milan.

== History ==
The first Italian Ice Sports Federation was established in September 1926 in Milan by the fusion of three pre-existing federations, those for bobsledding, ice skating and ice hockey. In 1933, the FISG combined with the Italian skiing federation to create the Federazione Italiana Sport Invernali (FISI) (Italian Federation for Winter Sports ), with its operations transferred to Rome.

After World War II, when Italian sports organizations were being recreated, ice hockey and skiing were separate from ice skating. In 1952, ice hockey again joined with ice skating creating the new Federazione Italiana Sport del Ghiaccio.

== National teams ==
- Italy men's national ice hockey team
- Italy men's national junior ice hockey team
- Italy men's national under-18 ice hockey team
- Italy women's national ice hockey team
- Italy women's national under-18 ice hockey team

== Sports ==
The FISG has authority over the following sports:

- Curling and wheelchair curling
- Ice hockey and para ice hockey
- Speed skating
- Figure skating
- Short track speed skating
- Ice stock sport

== Federation presidents ==
List of presidents

No.	Name	Tenure
1	Alberto Bonacossa	1926–1927
2	Luigi Tornielli di Borgolavezzaro	1927–1933
3	Renato Ricci	1934–1945
4	Enrico Calcaterra	1946–1952
5	Remo Vigorelli	1952–1960
6	Enrico Calcaterra	1960–1972
7	Mario Pinferi	1972–1980
8	Luciano Rimoldi	1980–1992
9	Paul Seeber	1992–1997
10	Giancarlo Bolognini	1997–2014
11	Andrea Gios	2014–

== Notable people ==
- Georges Larivière, technical director of the Italian Ice Sports Federation
- Lou Vairo, technical coordinator of ice hockey and coach of the Italy men's national ice hockey team
