= 1995–96 QMJHL season =

- League: Quebec Major Junior Hockey League
- Sport: Hockey
- Duration: Regular season Sept. 8, 1995 – Mar. 15, 1996; Playoffs; March 19 – May 3, 1996
- Teams: 14

Regular season
- Jean Rougeau Trophy: Granby Prédateurs (2)
- Season MVP: Christian Dubé (Sherbrooke Faucons)
- Top scorer: Daniel Brière (Drummondville Voltigeurs)

Playoffs
- Playoffs MVP: Jason Doig (Prédateurs)
- Finals champions: Granby Prédateurs (1)
- Runners-up: Beauport Harfangs

QMJHL seasons
- 1994–95 1996–97

1995–96 CHL season
- League: Canadian Hockey League
- Sport: Hockey
- Duration: OHL; Sept. 1995 – Mar. 1996; QMJHL; Sept. 8, 1995 – Mar. 15, 1996; WHL; Sept. 1995 – Mar. 1996
- Teams: 60

Memorial Cup
- Finals champions: Granby Prédateurs (QMHL) (2nd title)
- Runners-up: Peterborough Petes (OHL)

The 1995–96 QMJHL season was the 27th season in the history of the Quebec Major Junior Hockey League. The league continued to expand eastward, adding an expansion team in Moncton, New Brunswick, and the Saint-Jean Lynx relocated to the eastern Quebec city of Rimouski in the Bas-Saint-Laurent region. Fourteen teams played 70 games each in the schedule.

The Granby Prédateurs finished first overall in the regular season winning the Jean Rougeau Trophy, and won their 1st President's Cup, defeating the Beauport Harfangs in the finals. The Prédateurs became the first QMJHL team to win the Memorial Cup in 15 years, by defeating the Peterborough Petes in the finals of the 1996 Memorial Cup tournament.

== Team changes ==
- The Moncton Alpines join the league as an expansion franchise, playing in the Dilio Division.
- The Saint-Jean Lynx relocated to Rimouski, Quebec, becoming the Rimouski Océanic, and switch to the Dilio Division.
- The Drummondville Voltigeurs switch to the Lebel Division.
- The Sherbrooke Faucons switch to the Lebel Division.
- The Granby Bisons are renamed the Granby Prédateurs.

== Final standings ==
Note: GP = Games played; W = Wins; L = Losses; T = Ties; Pts = Points; GF = Goals for; GA = Goals against

Dilio Division	GP	W	L	T	Pts	GF	GA
Beauport Harfangs	70	37	26	7	81	284	233
Chicoutimi Saguenéens	70	35	29	6	76	274	242
Shawinigan Cataractes	70	35	30	5	75	289	259
Halifax Mooseheads	70	32	36	2	66	258	262
Victoriaville Tigres	70	27	41	2	56	246	289
Rimouski Océanic	70	25	41	4	54	267	317
Moncton Alpines	70	14	48	8	36	215	360

Lebel Division	GP	W	L	T	Pts	GF	GA
Granby Prédateurs	70	56	12	2	114	389	191
Hull Olympiques	70	52	16	2	106	347	246
Val-d'Or Foreurs	70	39	24	7	85	302	244
Sherbrooke Faucons	70	40	27	3	83	306	263
Drummondville Voltigeurs	70	33	34	3	69	299	274
Saint-Hyacinthe Laser	70	23	44	3	49	242	353
Laval Titan Collège Français	70	14	54	2	30	219	404

- Complete list of standings.

== Scoring leaders ==
Note: GP = Games played; G = Goals; A = Assists; Pts = Points; PIM = Penalty Minutes

Player	Team	GP	G	A	Pts	PIM
Daniel Brière	Drummondville Voltigeurs	67	67	96	163	84
Christian Dubé	Sherbrooke Faucons	62	52	93	145	105
Étienne Beaudry	Sherbrooke Faucons	70	55	85	140	55
Martin Menard	Hull Olympiques	70	61	76	137	125
Martin Chouinard	Granby Prédateurs	63	52	82	134	70
Allan Sirois	Rimouski Océanic	69	59	68	127	172
Jean-Guy Trudel	Hull Olympiques	70	50	71	121	96
Xavier Delisle	Granby Prédateurs	67	45	75	120	45
Frederic Chartier	Beauport Harfangs	62	49	71	120	81
Benoit Gratton	Laval / Granby	65	33	85	118	227

- Complete scoring statistics.

== Leading goaltenders ==
Note: GP = Games played; TOI = Total ice time; W = Wins; L = Losses; GA = Goals against; SO = Total shutouts; SV% = Save percentage; GAA = Goals against average

Player	Team	GP	TOI	W	L	GA	SO	SV%	GAA
Frederic Deschênes	Granby Prédateurs	47	3206	34	7	110	2	.899	2.63
Martin Biron	Beauport Harfangs	55	3206	29	17	152	1	.897	2.84
Marc Denis	Chicoutimi Saguenéens	51	2955	23	22	157	2	.891	3.19
José Théodore	Hull Olympiques	48	2808	33	11	158	0	.889	3.38
Pierre-Luc Therrien	Drummondville Voltigeurs	37	2073	15	17	117	1	.894	3.39

== Playoffs ==
Xavier Delisle was the leading scorer of the playoffs with 40 points (13 goals, 27 assists).

Divisional round-robin

Note: GP = Games played; W = Wins; L = Losses; T = Ties; Pts = Points; GF = Goals for; GA = Goals against

Dilio Division standings	GP	W	L	T	Pts	GF	GA
Victoriaville Tigres	6	5	1	0	10	24	21
Beauport Harfangs	6	4	2	0	8	24	16
Rimouski Océanic	6	3	3	0	6	21	24
Chicoutimi Saguenéens	6	3	3	0	6	32	25
Shawinigan Cataractes	6	2	4	0	4	18	23
Halifax Mooseheads	6	1	5	0	2	19	29
Lebel Division standings	GP	W	L	T	Pts	GF	GA
Granby Prédateurs	6	5	1	0	10	39	14
Hull Olympiques	6	4	2	0	8	30	24
Val-d'Or Foreurs	6	4	2	0	8	22	20
Saint-Hyacinthe Laser ^{‡}	7	3	4	0	6	20	24
Sherbrooke Faucons ^{‡}	7	2	5	0	4	17	31
Drummondville Voltigeurs	6	1	5	0	2	28	43

^{‡} Saint-Hyacinthe Laser defeated Sherbrooke Faucons in a one-game playoff to determine 4th place in the round-robin standings.

Playoffs Bracket

Quarterfinals
L1	Granby	4
L4	Saint-Hyacinthe	1
D1	Victoriaville	2
D4	Chicoutimi	4
L2	Hull	4
L3	Val-d'Or	3
D2	Beauport	4
D3	Rimouski	0

Semifinals
L1	Granby	4
D4	Chicoutimi	1
L2	Hull	1
D2	Beauport	4

Finals
L1	Granby	4
D2	Beauport	1

== All-star teams ==
First team

- Goaltender – Frederic Deschênes, Granby Prédateurs
- Left defence – Denis Gauthier, Drummondville Voltigeurs
- Right defence – Stephane Robidas, Shawinigan Cataractes
- Left winger – Daniel Goneau, Granby Prédateurs
- Centreman – Christian Dubé, Sherbrooke Faucons
- Right winger – Frederic Chartier, Beauport Harfangs
- Coach – Jean Pronovost, Shawinigan Cataractes

Second team

- Goaltender – José Théodore, Hull Olympiques
- Left defence – Jan Nemecek, Hull Olympiques
- Right defence – DD/RD Francis Bouillon, Granby Prédateurs
- Left winger – Jean-Guy Trudel, Hull Olympiques
- Centreman – Danny Brière, Drummondville Voltigeurs
- Right winger – Xavier Delisle, Granby Prédateurs
- Coach – Robert Mongrain, Hull Olympiques

Rookie team

- Goaltender – Mathieu Garon, Victoriaville Tigres
- Left defence – Mario Larocque, Hull Olympiques
- Right defence – Colin White, Hull Olympiques
- Left winger – Pierre Dagenais, Victoriaville Tigres
- Centreman – Patrick Grandmaitre, Victoriaville Tigres
- Right winger – Pavel Rosa, Hull Olympiques
- Coach – Gaston Therrien, Rimouski Océanic

List of First/Second/Rookie team all-stars.

== Trophies and awards ==
Team

- President's Cup – Playoff Champions, Granby Prédateurs
- Jean Rougeau Trophy – Regular Season Champions, Granby Prédateurs
- Robert Lebel Trophy – Team with best GAA, Granby Prédateurs

Player

- Michel Brière Memorial Trophy – Most Valuable Player, Christian Dubé, Sherbrooke Faucons
- Jean Béliveau Trophy – Top Scorer, Danny Briere, Drummondville Voltigeurs
- Guy Lafleur Trophy – Playoff MVP, Jason Doig, Granby Prédateurs
- Ford Cup – Offensive – Offensive Player of the Year, Danny Briere, Drummondville Voltigeurs
- Ford Cup – Defensive – Defensive Player of the Year, Christian Laflamme, Beauport Harfangs
- AutoPro Plaque – Best plus/minus total, Daniel Goneau, Granby Prédateurs
- Jacques Plante Memorial Trophy – Best GAA, Frederic Deschenes, Granby Prédateurs
- Emile Bouchard Trophy – Defenceman of the Year, Denis Gauthier, Drummondville Voltigeurs
- Mike Bossy Trophy – Best Pro Prospect, Jean-Pierre Dumont, Val-d'Or Foreurs
- New Faces Cup – Rookie of the Year, not awarded
- Michel Bergeron Trophy – Offensive Rookie of the Year, Pavel Rosa, Hull Olympiques
- Raymond Lagacé Trophy – Defensive Rookie of the Year, Mathieu Garon, Victoriaville Tigres
- Frank J. Selke Memorial Trophy – Most sportsmanlike player, Christian Dubé, Sherbrooke Faucons
- QMJHL Humanitarian of the Year – Humanitarian of the Year, Danny Briere, Drummondville Voltigeurs
- Marcel Robert Trophy – Best Scholastic Player, Marc Denis, Chicoutimi Saguenéens
- Paul Dumont Trophy – Personality of the Year, Christian Dubé, Sherbrooke Faucons

Executive

- Ron Lapointe Trophy – Coach of the Year, Jean Pronovost, Shawinigan Cataractes
- John Horman Trophy – Executive of the Year, Andre Jolicoeur, Rimouski Océanic
- St-Clair Group Plaque – Marketing Director of the Year, Éric Forest, Rimouski Océanic

== See also ==
- 1996 Memorial Cup
- 1996 NHL entry draft
- 1995–96 OHL season
- 1995–96 WHL season

Preceded by 1994–95 QMJHL season	QMJHL seasons	Succeeded by 1996–97 QMJHL season
