= Benoît Gratton =

Canadian ice hockey player (born 1976)

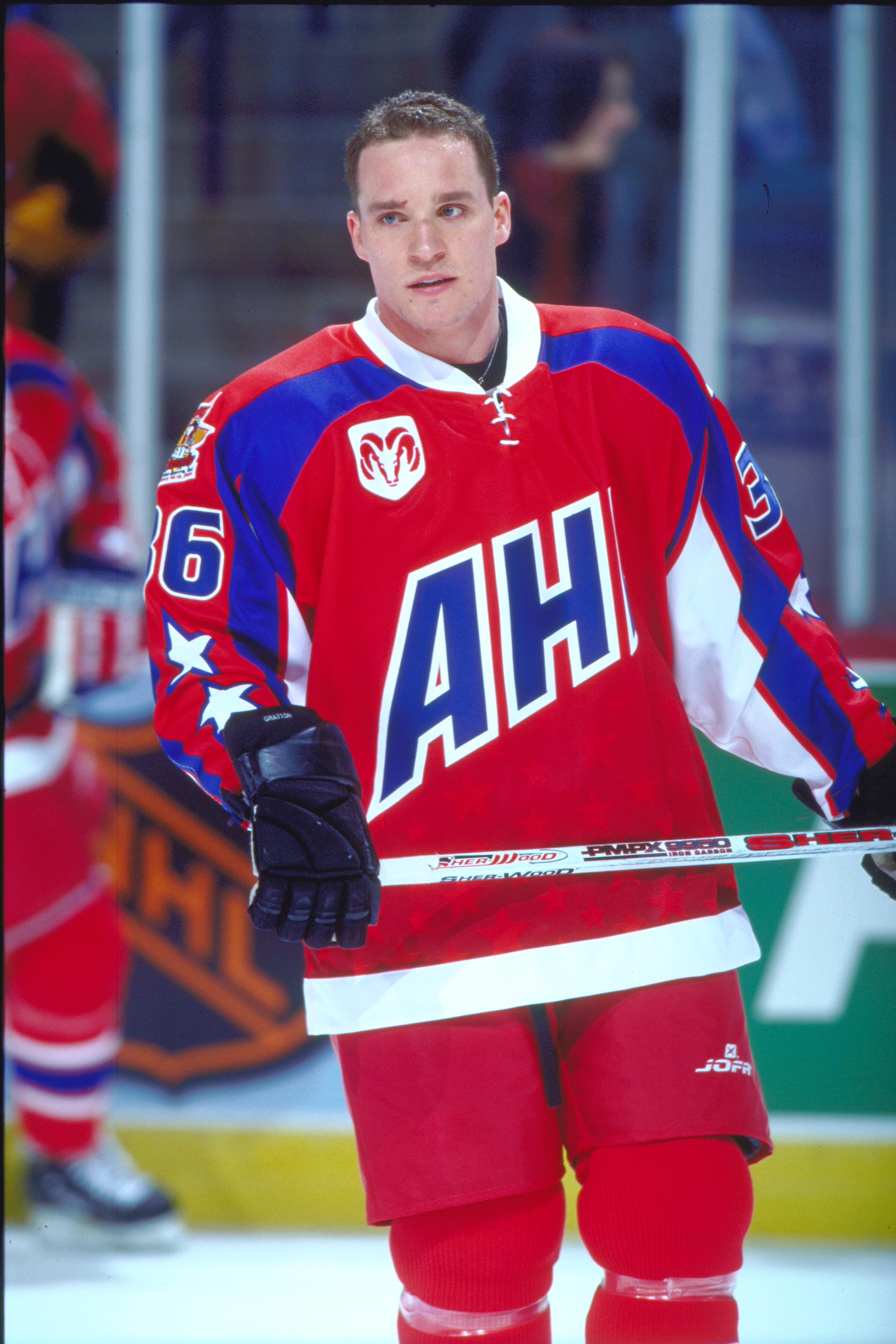
- Born: 28 December 1976 (age 49) Montreal, Quebec, Canada
- Height: 5 ft 11 in (180 cm)
- Weight: 194 lb (88 kg; 13 st 12 lb)
- Position: Centre
- Shot: Left
- Played for: Washington Capitals; Calgary Flames; Montreal Canadiens; HC Lugano; Hamburg Freezers; Vienna Capitals
- NHL draft: 105th overall, 1995; Washington Capitals
- Playing career: 1996–2017

Benoît Jacques Joseph Gratton (born December 28, 1976) is a Canadian former professional ice hockey forward who played in the National Hockey League (NHL). He is currently the head coach for Jonquière Marquis of the Ligue Nord-Américaine de Hockey (LNAH).

== Playing career ==
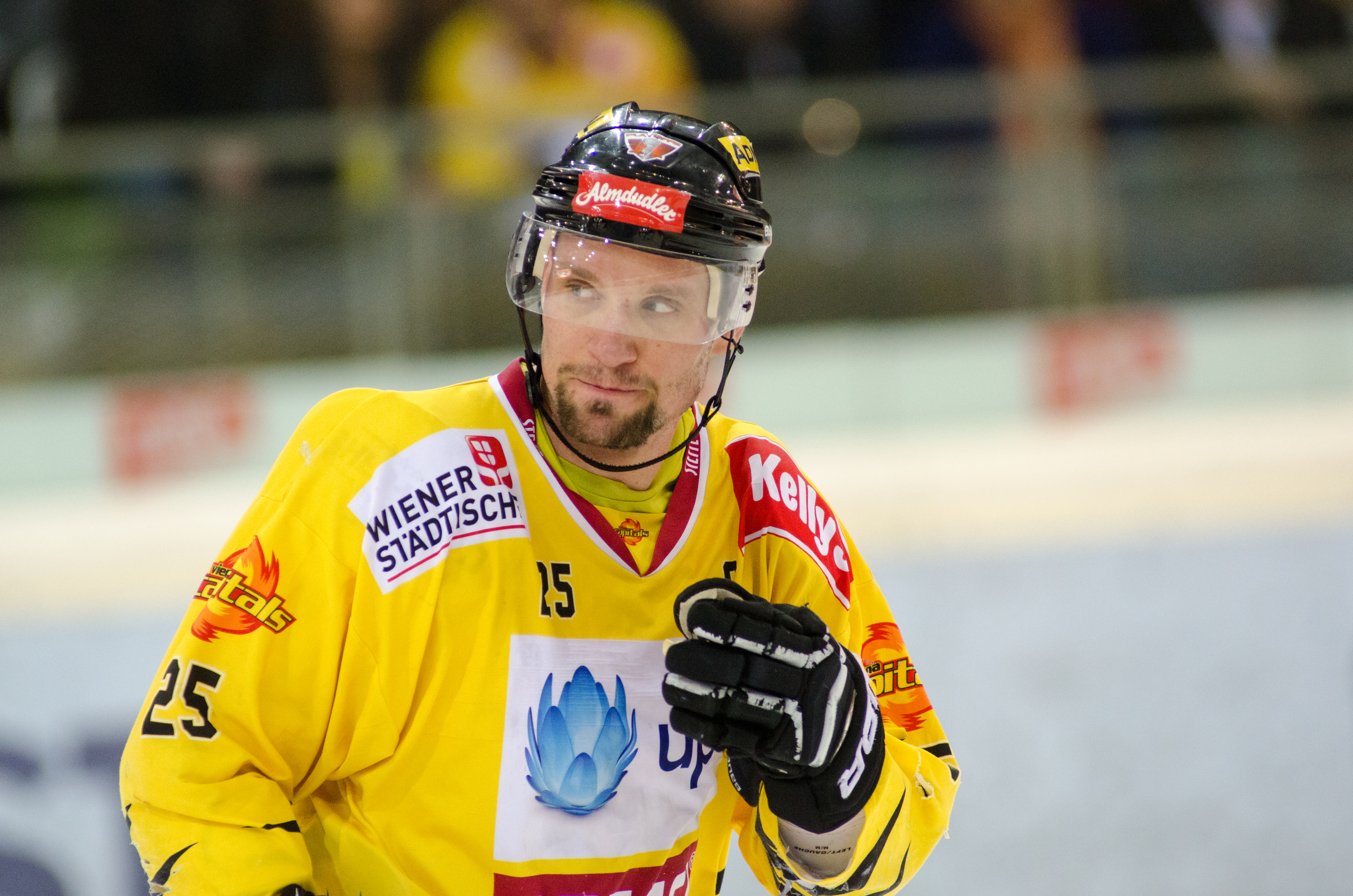
Gratton during his tenure with the Vienna Capitals in 2014.

Gratton was born in Montreal, Quebec. As a youth, he played in the 1989 and 1990 Quebec International Pee-Wee Hockey Tournaments with a minor ice hockey team from Montreal.

Selected 105th overall by the Washington Capitals in the 1995 NHL entry draft, Gratton spent several seasons in the Capitals' system before he was traded to the Calgary Flames in 1999. After spending several seasons in the Flames' organization, he was claimed on waivers in 2001 by the Montreal Canadiens.

From 2004 to 2014, Gratton played hockey in Europe, most notably playing six seasons with the Vienna Capitals.

After sitting out the 2014–15 season, Gratton made a semi-professional return in the Quebec-based Ligue Nord-Américaine de Hockey (LNAH) with Jonquière Marquis, playing two seasons until announcing his retirement following the 2016–17 season.

== Coaching career ==
Prior to the 2017–18 season, Gratton continued his association with Jonquière Marquis as he was appointed head coach of the club on August 18, 2017.

== Career statistics ==
			Regular season					Playoffs
Season	Team	League	GP	G	A	Pts	PIM	GP	G	A	Pts	PIM
1992–93	Laval Régents	QMAAA	40	19	38	57	74	13	1	9	10	27
1993–94	Laval Titan	QMJHL	51	9	14	23	70	20	2	1	3	19
1994–95	Laval Titan Collège Français	QMJHL	71	30	58	88	199	20	8	21	29	42
1995–96	Laval Titan Collège Français	QMJHL	38	21	39	60	130	—	—	—	—	—
1995–96	Granby Prédateurs	QMJHL	27	12	46	58	97	21	13	26	39	68
1996–97	Portland Pirates	AHL	76	6	40	46	140	5	2	1	3	14
1997–98	Washington Capitals	NHL	6	0	1	1	6	—	—	—	—	—
1997–98	Portland Pirates	AHL	58	19	31	50	137	8	4	2	6	24
1998–99	Washington Capitals	NHL	16	4	3	7	16	—	—	—	—	—
1998–99	Portland Pirates	AHL	64	18	42	60	135	—	—	—	—	—
1999–2000	Saint John Flames	AHL	65	17	49	66	137	3	0	1	1	4
1999–2000	Calgary Flames	NHL	10	0	2	2	10	—	—	—	—	—
2000–01	Saint John Flames	AHL	53	10	36	46	153	—	—	—	—	—
2000–01	Calgary Flames	NHL	14	1	3	4	14	—	—	—	—	—
2001–02	Montreal Canadiens	NHL	8	1	0	1	8	—	—	—	—	—
2001–02	Quebec Citadelles	AHL	35	10	19	29	70	3	2	3	5	10
2002–03	Hamilton Bulldogs	AHL	43	21	39	60	78	22	2	15	17	73
2003–04	Hamilton Bulldogs	AHL	50	18	33	51	119	10	1	2	3	67
2003–04	Montreal Canadiens	NHL	4	0	1	1	4	—	—	—	—	—
2004–05	HC Lugano	NLA	31	6	12	18	81	—	—	—	—	—
2005–06	Hamburg Freezers	DEL	47	13	35	48	214	6	3	2	5	18
2006–07	Hamburg Freezers	DEL	39	8	24	32	139	4	4	2	6	14
2007–08	Hamburg Freezers	DEL	54	10	22	32	97	8	3	2	5	14
2008–09	Vienna Capitals	AUT	40	20	38	58	162	9	4	7	11	24
2009–10	Vienna Capitals	AUT	49	18	41	59	140	12	4	14	18	68
2010–11	Vienna Capitals	AUT	45	27	46	73	247	11	7	12	19	28
2011–12	Vienna Capitals	AUT	42	20	33	53	127	7	1	7	8	22
2012–13	Vienna Capitals	AUT	42	14	29	43	65	2	0	1	1	14
2013–14	Vienna Capitals	AUT	49	12	41	53	128	5	2	4	6	28
2015–16	Jonquière Marquis	LNAH	34	18	36	54	119	9	2	9	11	35
2016–17	Jonquière Marquis	LNAH	29	10	30	40	104	11	1	8	9	30
AHL totals			444	119	289	408	969	51	11	24	35	192
NHL totals			58	6	10	16	58	—	—	—	—	—
AUT totals			267	111	228	339	869	46	18	45	63	184

== Awards and honours ==
Award	Year	
CHL
Memorial Cup (Granby Prédateurs)	1996	
AHL
All-Star Game	2001, 2004	EBEL
Ron Kennedy Trophy (MVP)	2011	
