= Daniel Goneau =

Canadian ice hockey player

- Born: January 16, 1976 (age 50) Montreal, Quebec, Canada
- Height: 6 ft 0 in (183 cm)
- Weight: 194 lb (88 kg; 13 st 12 lb)
- Position: Left wing
- Shot: Left
- Played for: New York Rangers; Bracknell Bees; Épinal
- NHL draft: 47th overall, 1994; Boston Bruins; 48th overall, 1996; New York Rangers
- Playing career: 1996–2009

Daniel Goneau (born January 16, 1976) is a Canadian former professional ice hockey player. He played in 53 games the National Hockey League with the New York Rangers from 1996 to 2000. The rest of his career, which lasted from 1996 to 2009, was mainly spent in the minor leagues.

== Biography ==
As a youth, Goneau played in the 1990 Quebec International Pee-Wee Hockey Tournament with a minor ice hockey team from Verdun, Quebec.

Goneau was originally drafted by the Boston Bruins at the 1994 NHL entry draft, but chose not to sign with them. Two years later, he was drafted by the Rangers in the 1996 NHL entry draft. Goneau played in 41 games during the 1996–97 NHL season, collecting ten goals and three assists for 13 points. The following season he played in only 11 games scoring twice, while spending most of the season with the Rangers' American Hockey League (AHL) affiliate, the Hartford Wolf Pack. After spending the entire 1998–99 season with the Wolf Pack, Goneau returned for one more game during the 1999–2000 season which proved to be his final game in the NHL.

Goneau later played in the AHL, the International Hockey League and the United Hockey League, before retiring in 2008. He also played in the United Kingdom for the Bracknell Bees during the 2001–02 ISL season, scoring 15 points in as many games.

== Career statistics ==
=== Regular season and playoffs ===
			Regular season					Playoffs
Season	Team	League	GP	G	A	Pts	PIM	GP	G	A	Pts	PIM
1990–91	Laval Leafs	QAHA	32	16	18	34	20	—	—	—	—	—
1991–92	Lac St-Louis Lions	QMAAA	42	21	14	35	52	14	1	4	5	6
1992–93	Laval Titan	QMJHL	62	16	25	41	44	13	0	4	4	4
1992–93	Laval Titan	M-Cup	—	—	—	—	—	5	0	4	4	4
1993–94	Laval Titan	QMJHL	66	28	57	85	81	19	8	21	29	45
1993–94	Laval Titan	M-Cup	—	—	—	—	—	5	5	2	7	10
1994–95	Laval Titan Collège Français	QMJHL	56	16	31	47	78	20	5	10	15	33
1995–96	Granby Prédateurs	QMJHL	67	54	51	105	115	21	11	22	33	40
1995–96	Granby Prédateurs	M-Cup	—	—	—	—	—	4	3	2	5	4
1996–97	New York Rangers	NHL	41	10	3	13	10	—	—	—	—	—
1996–97	Binghamton Rangers	AHL	39	15	15	30	10	—	—	—	—	—
1997–98	New York Rangers	NHL	11	2	0	2	4	—	—	—	—	—
1997–98	Hartford Wolf Pack	AHL	66	21	26	47	44	13	1	4	5	18
1998–99	Hartford Wolf Pack	AHL	72	20	19	39	56	2	1	0	1	0
1999–00	New York Rangers	NHL	1	0	0	0	0	—	—	—	—	—
1999–00	Hartford Wolf Pack	AHL	51	15	17	32	48	22	1	2	3	6
2000–01	Manitoba Moose	IHL	58	10	14	24	26	—	—	—	—	—
2000–01	Detroit Vipers	IHL	15	6	4	10	8	—	—	—	—	—
2001–02	ERC Ingolstadt	GER-2	13	4	5	9	55	—	—	—	—	—
2001–02	Bracknell Bees	BISL	15	6	9	15	14	—	—	—	—	—
2002–03	Louisiana IceGators	ECHL	48	21	43	64	102	—	—	—	—	—
2002–03	Hershey Bears	AHL	3	0	1	1	0	—	—	—	—	—
2002–03	Richmond Renegades	ECHL	8	3	4	7	8	—	—	—	—	—
2002–03	Lowell Lock Monsters	AHL	13	2	1	3	8	—	—	—	—	—
2003–04	Fife Flyers	BNL	33	22	37	59	42	2	1	0	1	2
2004–05	Épinal	FRA	25	9	16	25	81	4	1	3	4	72
2005–06	Chiefs de Laval	LNAH	52	23	39	62	42	5	2	5	7	4
2006–07	Fort Wayne Komets	UHL	69	22	35	57	77	10	2	6	8	8
2007–08	Saint-François de Sherbrooke	LNAH	25	7	10	17	20	—	—	—	—	—
2007–08	Isothermic de Thetford Mines	LNAH	22	6	14	20	12	—	—	—	—	—
2008–09	VEU Feldkirch	AUT-2	22	16	11	27	78	8	3	3	6	20
AHL totals			244	73	79	152	166	37	3	6	9	24
NHL totals			53	12	3	15	14	—	—	—	—	—
