= Benoit Coulombe =

Canadian scientist

Benoit Coulombe (born 1958 in Granby, Quebec) is a Canadian scientist whose research focuses on the mechanisms by which regulated protein–protein, protein–DNA and protein–RNA interactions control the activity of RNA polymerase II, the molecular machine that synthesizes all messenger RNA (mRNA) and some small-nuclear RNA (snRNA) in eukaryotes.

Coulombe obtained his bachelor's degree in Biochemistry in 1981 and his PhD in Molecular Biology in 1988 at the University of Montreal, before undertaking postdoctoral work at the University of Toronto and the Free University of Brussels. In 1993 he moved to the University of Sherbrooke as an assistant professor, later attaining the tenured rank of full professor. In 2001 he moved to the Institut de recherches cliniques de Montréal.

Coulombe is best known for his "promoter wrapping model" for transcriptional initiation by multi-subunit RNA polymerases, which has been described in molecular biology textbooks. More recently, his laboratory has used protein affinity purification coupled with mass spectrometry to generate high-resolution maps of the interactome of human RNA polymerases. In 2012, the Coulombe laboratory discovered that methylation of molecular chaperones is a central element of a posttranslational modification code, they termed the "chaperone code", that orchestrates the functional organization of the proteome.
