= Philippe Audet =

Canadian ice hockey player (born 1977)

- Born: June 4, 1977 (age 49) Ottawa, Ontario, Canada
- Height: 6 ft 1 in (185 cm)
- Weight: 196 lb (89 kg; 14 st 0 lb)
- Position: Left wing
- Shot: Left
- Played for: Detroit Red Wings; AIK; Augsburg Panthers
- NHL draft: 52nd overall, 1995; Detroit Red Wings
- Playing career: 1997–2012

Philippe Audet (born June 4, 1977) is a Canadian former professional ice hockey player. He played 4 games in the National Hockey League with the Detroit Red Wings during the 1998–99 season. The rest of his career, which lasted from 1997 to 2013, was spent in various minor leagues and briefly in Europe.

== Playing career ==
Audet was born in Ottawa, Ontario. As a youth, he played in the 1991 Quebec International Pee-Wee Hockey Tournament with a minor ice hockey team from Beauce, Quebec. He was drafted by the Detroit Red Wings 52nd overall in the 1995 NHL entry draft, later playing with that team in the National Hockey League in their 1998–99 season.After playing for the Red Wings, he played for two teams in the AHL, as well as a team in Elitserien and a team in Deutsche Eishockey Liga.

== Career statistics ==
=== Regular season and playoffs ===
			Regular season					Playoffs
Season	Team	League	GP	G	A	Pts	PIM	GP	G	A	Pts	PIM
1992–93	Beauce-Amiante	QAHA	28	21	24	45	75	—	—	—	—	—
1993–94	Trois-Rivieres Estacades	QMAAA	34	22	21	43	90	4	3	3	6	6
1994–95	Granby Bisons	QMJHL	62	19	17	36	93	13	2	5	7	10
1995–96	Granby Predateurs	QMJHL	67	40	43	83	162	21	12	18	30	32
1995–96	Granby Predateurs	M-Cup	—	—	—	—	—	4	4	4	8	10
1996–97	Granby Predateurs	QMJHL	67	52	56	108	150	4	4	1	5	25
1996–97	Adirondack Red Wings	AHL	3	1	1	2	0	1	1	0	1	0
1997–98	Adirondack Red Wings	AHL	50	7	8	15	43	1	0	0	0	0
1998–99	Detroit Red Wings	NHL	4	0	0	0	0	—	—	—	—	—
1998–99	Adirondack Red Wings	AHL	70	20	20	40	77	2	1	0	1	4
1999–00	Cincinnati Mighty Ducks	AHL	62	19	22	41	115	—	—	—	—	—
1999–00	Springfield Falcons	AHL	14	3	7	10	6	5	3	1	4	14
2000–01	Springfield Falcons	AHL	80	26	31	57	113	—	—	—	—	—
2001–02	AIK	SWE	29	8	7	15	69	—	—	—	—	—
2002–03	Augsburg Panthers	DEL	50	16	14	30	135	—	—	—	—	—
2003–04	Garaga de Saint-Georges	QSPHL	43	36	36	72	68	23	16	18	34	20
2004–05	Essen Mosquitoes	GER-2	43	21	38	59	152	—	—	—	—	—
2005–06	CRS Express de Saint-Georges	LNAH	53	35	48	83	92	4	1	1	2	18
2006–07	CRS Express de Saint-Georges	LNAH	46	35	30	65	94	10	10	7	17	34
2007–08	CRS Express de Saint-Georges	LNAH	43	25	26	51	67	11	4	9	13	26
2008–09	CRS Express de Saint-Georges	LNAH	42	35	30	65	70	5	7	6	13	6
2009–10	CRS Express de Saint-Georges	LNAH	15	6	4	10	27	18	7	17	24	30
2010–11	Cool FM 103,5 de Saint-Georges	LNAH	35	24	22	46	57	7	5	3	8	2
2011–12	Cool FM 103,5 de Saint-Georges	LNAH	41	22	31	53	71	—	—	—	—	—
2012–13	Cool FM 103,5 de Saint-Georges	LNAH	1	0	0	0	0	—	—	—	—	—
QSPHL/LNAH totals			319	218	227	445	546	78	50	61	111	136
NHL totals			4	0	0	0	0	—	—	—	—	—
