= Jason Doig =

Canadian ice hockey player (born 1977)

- Born: January 29, 1977 (age 49) Montreal, Quebec, Canada
- Height: 6 ft 3 in (191 cm)
- Weight: 230 lb (104 kg; 16 st 6 lb)
- Position: Defence
- Shot: Right
- Played for: Winnipeg Jets; Phoenix Coyotes; New York Rangers; Washington Capitals
- NHL draft: 34th overall, 1995; Winnipeg Jets
- Playing career: 1995–2008

Jason Nicholas Doig (born January 29, 1977) is a Canadian former professional ice hockey player who played in the National Hockey League with the Winnipeg Jets, Phoenix Coyotes, New York Rangers and the Washington Capitals.

== Early life ==
Doig was born in Montreal, Quebec. His parents, Michael and Paula Doig, immigrated to Canada from Jamaica prior to his birth for educational purposes, obtaining their degrees from Concordia University and McGill University, respectively. Doig grew up in Dollard-des-Ormeaux, a suburb of Montreal, where he attended St. Charles Elementary School, West Island College high school and Vanier College. Aside from hockey, he played soccer at a very high level with the West Island Lakers soccer club and was invited to play for Team Quebec.

As a youth, he played in the 1991 Quebec International Pee-Wee Hockey Tournament with the North Shore minor ice hockey team.

== Playing career ==
The Montreal, Quebec native impressed in his youth with the North Shore hockey team in the QAHA then with Lac St-Louis Lions of the Quebec Midget AAA Hockey League before making his Quebec Major Junior Hockey League debut with the St-Jean Lynx in 1993-94. That same year, Doig lead Team Quebec to a gold medal in dazzling fashion at World Under-17 Hockey Challenge where he scored the tying and game-winning goal in the final game against Team USA. The following year he represented Team Canada at the World Under-18 Tournament in Mexico City - taking home the gold medal. He was chosen 34th overall by the Winnipeg Jets in the 1995 NHL Entry Draft after scoring 55 points and registering 259 penalty minutes with the Quebec Major Junior Hockey League's Laval Titan's and played in the Canadian Hockey League all-star game. In 1996 he was returned to the QMJHL where he led the Granby Predateurs to the President's Cup – winning the coveted Guy Lafleur Trophy as the playoff MVP and then on to a Memorial Cup Championship where he was named as a first team all-star. That same year he was named team Captain for the West Team at QMJHL all-star game. The next year Jason was a member of Team Canada when it won the gold medal at the World Junior Ice Hockey Championships in Switzerland.

Doig played for the Winnipeg Jets as an 18-year-old in 1995-96 and remained with the franchise when it relocated to Arizona in 1996-97 and became the Phoenix Coyotes. He then joined the New York Rangers in a trade prior to the deadline in March, 1999. The 6'3" blueliner played for the Blueshirts and saw action with the American Hockey League's Hartford Wolf Pack where he won a Calder Cup in 2000. The hulking blueliner played two seasons in the New York Rangers organization before he was dealt to the Ottawa Senators where he played only one season with the team's AHL affiliate, the Grand Rapids Griffins.

Following his brief stint with the Ottawa Senators organization, Doig was acquired by the Washington Capitals in 2002-03 where he became a solid blueliner with the club while spending the early part of the season with the team's AHL affiliate, the Portland Pirates.

Following a season away from hockey due to the NHL lock out, Doig was signed as a free agent by the Vancouver Canucks and sent to compete with the club's AHL affiliate, the Manitoba Moose.

In the 2006–2007 season he played for Traktor Chelyabinsk in Russian Super League and finished the season in the Swiss National League A with the Langnau SCL Tigers. In that same year, Jason represented Team Canada once again at the Spengler Cup in Davos, Switzerland where the team won the Silver Medal. In the 2007–2008 season, he played in Switzerland with EHC Basel. He then signed a contract for the remainder of the season with the Norwegian top division team Stavanger Oilers. After Stavanger was eliminated from the Norwegian playoffs, Doig announced that he would retire.

== Personal life ==
Since retiring in 2007, Doig became a principal with Los Angeles-based investment bank Park Lane, where he specialized on the hockey side of the business. While at Park Lane, Doig founded TreeVestors, an investment firm specializing in the development, origination and financing of social and environmentally sustainable carbon forestry projects. Currently, Doig is a Regional Sales Coordinator with Aflac, a Fortune 200 company specialized in supplemental employee benefits. Doig lives in Los Angeles with his three children.

== Championships and medals ==
- 1993 Under-17 World Hockey Challenge, Team Quebec - Gold Medal
- 1994 Under-18 Copa Mexico, Team Canada - Gold Medal
- 1996 QMJHL President's Cup, Granby Predators
- 1996 Memorial Cup Championship, Granby Predators
- 1997 Under-20 World Junior Championship, Team Canada - Gold Medal
- 2000 Calder Cup, Hartford Wolfpack
- 2007 Spengler Cup, Team Canada - Silver Medal

== Honors and awards ==
- Under-17 MVP (1993)
- QMJHL All-Rookie Team (1994)
- Guy Lafleur Trophy (1996)
- Memorial Cup All-Star Team (1996)
- QMJHL All-Star Team (1997)

== Career statistics ==
=== Regular season and playoffs ===
			Regular season					Playoffs
Season	Team	League	GP	G	A	Pts	PIM	GP	G	A	Pts	PIM
1990–91	North Shore Selects	QAHA	31	30	33	63	53	—	—	—	—	—
1991–92	North Shore Selects	QAHA	29	11	11	22	20	—	—	—	—	—
1992–93	Lac St-Louis Lions	QAAA	35	11	16	27	40	7	5	5	10	16
1993–94	St-Jean Lynx	QMJHL	63	8	17	25	65	5	0	2	2	2
1994–95	Laval Titan	QMJHL	55	12	42	54	259	20	4	13	17	39
1995–96	Laval Titan	QMJHL	5	3	6	9	20	—	—	—	—	—
1995–96	Granby Predateurs	QMJHL	24	4	30	34	91	20	10	22	32	110
1995–96	Winnipeg Jets	NHL	15	1	1	2	28	—	—	—	—	—
1995–96	Springfield Falcons	AHL	5	0	0	0	28	—	—	—	—	—
1995–96	Granby Predateurs	M-Cup	—	—	—	—	—	4	3	2	5	10
1996–97	Granby Predateurs	QMJHL	39	14	33	47	197	5	0	4	4	27
1996–97	Las Vegas Thunder	IHL	6	0	1	1	19	—	—	—	—	—
1996–97	Springfield Falcons	AHL	5	0	3	3	2	17	1	4	5	37
1997–98	Phoenix Coyotes	NHL	4	0	1	1	12	—	—	—	—	—
1997–98	Springfield Falcons	AHL	46	2	25	27	153	3	0	0	0	2
1998–99	Phoenix Coyotes	NHL	9	0	1	1	10	—	—	—	—	—
1998–99	Springfield Falcons	AHL	32	3	5	8	67	—	—	—	—	—
1998–99	Hartford Wolf Pack	AHL	8	1	4	5	40	7	1	1	2	39
1999–00	New York Rangers	NHL	7	0	1	1	22	—	—	—	—	—
1999–00	Hartford Wolf Pack	AHL	27	3	11	14	70	21	1	5	6	20
2000–01	New York Rangers	NHL	3	0	0	0	0	—	—	—	—	—
2000–01	Hartford Wolf Pack	AHL	52	4	20	24	178	5	0	1	1	4
2001–02	Grand Rapids Griffins	AHL	57	1	17	18	103	5	0	0	0	18
2002–03	Washington Capitals	NHL	55	3	5	8	108	6	0	1	1	6
2002–03	Portland Pirates	AHL	21	1	4	5	66	—	—	—	—	—
2003–04	Washington Capitals	NHL	65	2	9	11	105	—	—	—	—	—
2005–06	Manitoba Moose	AHL	18	0	4	4	24	—	—	—	—	—
2006–07	Traktor Chelyabinsk	RSL	13	0	2	2	30	—	—	—	—	—
2006–07	SCL Tigers Langnau	NLA	—	—	—	—	—	8	3	3	6	39
2007–08	EHC Basel	NLA	19	0	5	5	97	—	—	—	—	—
2007–08	Stavanger Oilers	NOR	9	0	2	2	18	3	0	0	0	6
AHL totals			271	15	93	108	731	58	3	11	14	120
NHL totals			158	6	18	24	285	6	0	1	1	6

=== International ===
Year	Team	Event	GP	G	A	Pts	PIM
1997	Canada	WJC	7	0	2	2	27
Junior totals			7	0	2	2	27

== See also ==
- List of Black ice hockey players
