= Galeries de Granby =

Coordinates: 45°24′52″N 72°44′59″W

- Location: 40, rue Évangéline; Granby, Quebec; J2G 8K1
- Opened: 1974
- Manager: Westcliff
- Owner: Westcliff
- Num. of stores: 96
- Num. of anchor tenants: 4
- Floor area: 497,652 sq ft (46,233.4 m^{2})
- Floors: 1
- Parking: Outdoor (2,897 spaces)
- Website: galeriesdegranby.com

Galeries de Granby is a regional shopping mall in Granby, Quebec, Canada. It opened in 1974 and was enlarged in 1980 and 2001. It has 96 stores and its floor area is 497,652 sq ft (46,233.4 m^{2}).

== Anchor tenants ==
- IGA
- Walmart
