= Centre sportif Léonard-Grondin =

Arena in Quebec, Canada

Coordinates: 45°24′18″N 72°44′59″W

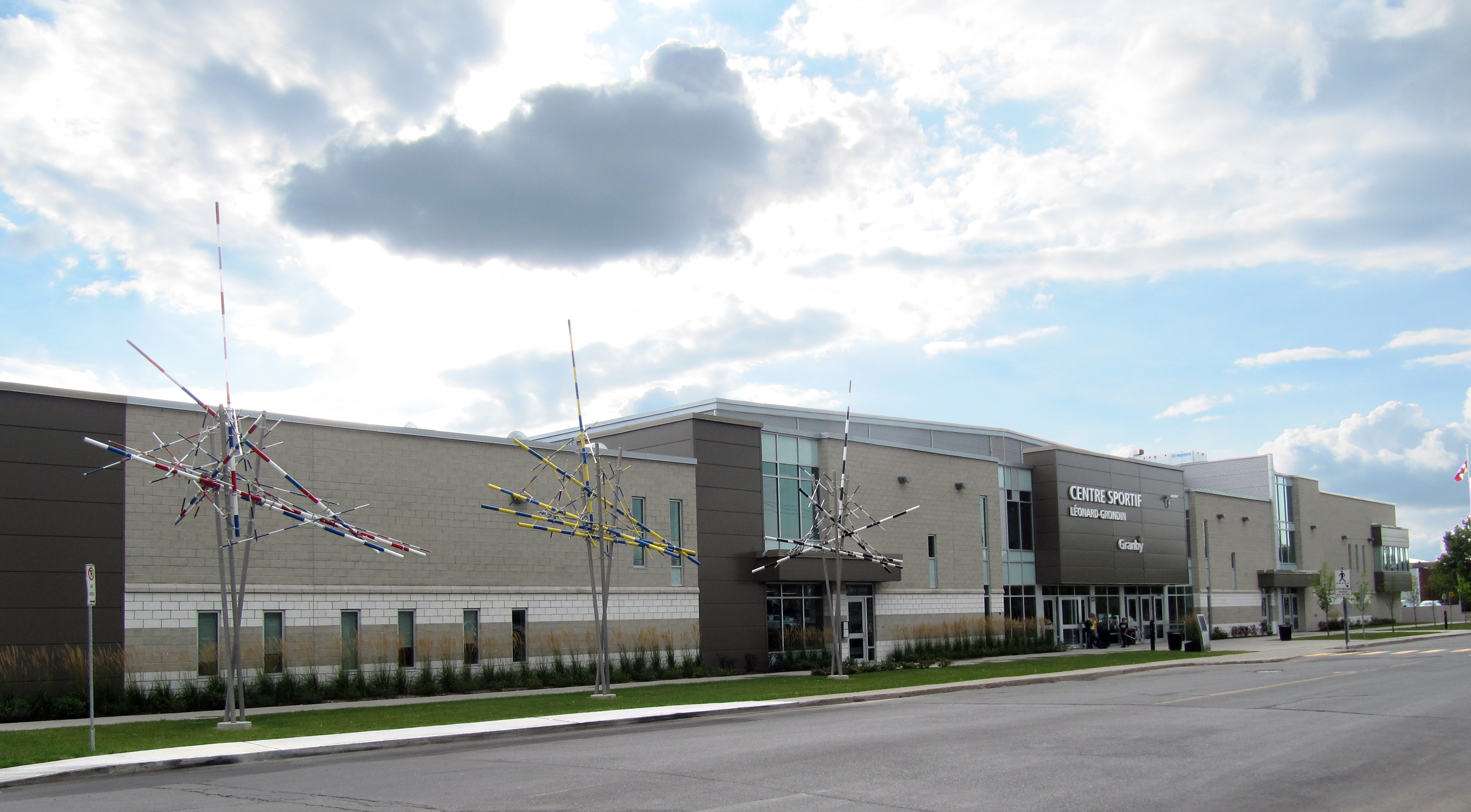
The Centre sportif Léonard-Grondin after the 2010-2011 renovations

The Centre sportif Léonard-Grondin (formerly the Aréna Léonard-Grondin and Palais des sports) is the main sports and events arena in Granby, Quebec. It was previously home to the Granby Bisons and Granby Prédateurs of the QMJHL and is currently the home arena of the Granby Inouk of the Quebec Junior Hockey League. Built in 1968, it originally seated 2,385 people. Major renovations in 2010–2011 modernized the facility and expanded it to three ice rinks and additional amenities. The current director is Guy Patenaude.

In 2025, the venue will host the Quebec edition of the Special Olympics Canada Summer Games.

== History ==
The complex was built in 1967 on Léon-Harmel Street and originally named the Palais des sports. It hosted hockey games, other sports, and cultural events.

Granby hockey teams date back to the 1950s, including the Junior B Guépards and later the Vics in the 1970s. In 1981, the Éperviers de Sorel relocated to the building and became the Granby Bisons of the QMJHL, featuring future NHL players such as Patrick Roy, Pierre Turgeon and Éric Desjardins.

In 1993, the arena was renamed Aréna Léonard-Grondin in honour of local businessman Léonard Grondin, a promoter of amateur hockey in the region.

A CA$20 million renovation between 2010 and 2011 modernized and expanded the facility.
