= Georges Larivière =

Canadian ice hockey coach and professor (born 1942)

- Born: 1942 (age 83–84)
- Education: University of Oregon
- Occupations: Professor, writer, lecturer, consultant, ice hockey coach
- Employer(s): Université de Montréal, Université du Québec à Trois-Rivières, Université Laval
- Organization(s): Hockey Canada, Canadian Amateur Hockey Association, Italian Ice Sports Federation
- Awards: Gordon Juckes Award

Georges Larivière (born 1942) is a Canadian retired ice hockey coach, professor, writer, and sports administrator. He was the director of the Faculty of Physical Education at the Université de Montréal, researched the development of ice hockey players, and wrote books and manuals for coaches in English and French. He served as a board member of Hockey Canada, and helped recruit players for the Canada men's national ice hockey team. During the 1980s he was an assistant coach for the Canada men's national junior ice hockey team, and coached the Granby Bisons in the Quebec Major Junior Hockey League. He was also a committee member of the Canadian Amateur Hockey Association, served as the technical director of the Italian Ice Sports Federation, lectured at sports-related conferences, and acted as a consultant for amateur sports organizations.

== Early career ==
Larivière was born in 1942. He received a Master of Science from University of Oregon in 1968, for his thesis, "Relationship between skating velocity and length of stride, angle of forward inclination and angle of propulsion". He has taught at the Université du Québec à Trois-Rivières, the Université Laval, and the Université de Montréal where he was director of the Faculty of Physical Education. His research included the detection and development of talent, growth and biological maturity and evaluation of the state of physical training.

== Hockey career ==
Larivière was appointed to the Hockey Canada board of directors in July 1976, as one of the two government representatives in his role as head of physical education at the Université de Montréal. While with Hockey Canada, he undertook missions to France and African French countries to instruct members of the youth and sports ministries. He also served as a director on the development council for the Canadian Amateur Hockey Association.

The Canada men's national ice hockey team did not participate in the Ice Hockey World Championships or in ice hockey at the Olympic Games from 1970 to 1976. When Canada returned to international play in 1977, Larivière collaborated with Derek Holmes to recruit players for the World Championships and for ice hockey at the 1980 Winter Olympics. In an interview with The Globe and Mail in advance of the 1977 Ice Hockey World Championships, Larivière said "We're gearing at those players who will not be offered the lucrative contracts. We want to enroll those players who will not make the National Hockey League until they are 24 or 25 years of age, if ever. With our alternative these players will compete for Canada in a top level brand of prestigious hockey, all the while getting their education at the college or university level. When they finished a three or four-year segment of the program they could then go to professional hockey, benefitting from what we had to offer". He envisioned the program continuing beyond 1980, and cited the need for an elite ice hockey training program staying together for three to four years. In February 1978, he announced funding plans to create a permanent national team similar to previous efforts by Father Bauer in the 1960s. The multi-year plan would receive C$200,000 of the needed $900,000 from the Government of Canada to train and school 50 athletes.

In August 1980, Larivière and his Université de Montréal colleague Claude Chapleau proposed to train a group of boys aged 12 to 13 years old, in a multiple-year program. The aim was to train more complete hockey players using the same scientific research put into effect by the Soviet Union national ice hockey team and the Czechoslovakia men's national ice hockey team during the 1960s. Chapleau stated that the original research applied by the Europeans was developed by Canadians, but never put into effect here in Canada, and that this endeavour would be the first of its kind in North America.

Larivière was an assistant coach to Dave King on the Canada men's national junior ice hockey team which won the gold medal at the 1982 World Junior Ice Hockey Championships, and was an assistant coach to Brian Kilrea on the Canadian team which placed fourth at the 1984 World Junior Ice Hockey Championships.

In 1984, Larivière conducted a research project with a transceiver inserted into a hockey helmet to communicate directly with players during games. The goal was to help the players learn what decisions to make in each situation. He said that, "players did not want to wear the helmet. They were like robots; they just did what their coach was telling them to do, instead of reacting to the game". He also created the sport school program which began training players at age 12, including on-ice and academic components similar to a university environment.

Larivière was named head coach of the Granby Bisons in the Quebec Major Junior Hockey League (QMJHL) for the 1985–86 QMJHL season. His appointment was described by The Washington Post as "part of a bold experiment for the next two years" and as "part of a research project" for his work at the Université de Montréal. He coached the first 48 games of the season and earned 14 wins, before handing over the team to his assistants. Future National Hockey League players he coached on the team included, Pierre Turgeon, Marc Bureau, Stéphane Quintal, Alain Côté, Martin Simard and Stéphane Roy.

Larivière later served as an assistant coach with the Saint-Jean Lynx, and as the technical director of the Italian Ice Sports Federation.

=== Coaching record ===
Career record as a head coach:

Season	Team	League	Games	Won	Lost	Tied	Points	Winning %
1985–86	Granby Bisons	QMJHL	48	14	32	2	30	0.313

=== Publications ===
Larivière authored books and papers of his research and theories dealing with identifying and developing talent, growth and maturity, and evaluating physical fitness. He published 28 works including book, manuals, handbooks and academic theses in English and French.

List of publications:

- Hockey de 4 à 10. (1967; in French)
- Relationship between skating velocity and length of stride, angle of forward inclination and angle of propulsion. (1968)
- Hockey; the right start. (1969)
- Comparison of the efficiency of six different patterns of intermittent ice hockey skating. (1972)
- Le patinage. (1974; in French)
- Beginner's program. (1974)
- Programme pour les novices. (1976; in French)
- Mesure de la condition physique et de l'efficacité technique de joueurs de hockey sur glace: normes pour différentes catégories de joueurs. (1976; in French)
- Rapport du Comité d'étude sur la formation des cadres sportifs québécois by Comité d'étude sur la formation des cadres sportifs québécois. (1978; in French)
- Rapport du Comité d'étude sur la formation des cadres sportifs québécois : extrait A : L'intervenant auprès du participant: l'entraîneur, l'animateur, l'instructeur by Comité d'étude sur la formation des cadres sportifs québécois. (1978; series in French)
- Physical fitness and technical skill appraisal of ice hockey players: norms for players of different age and categories. (1991)
- Milieux professionnels en éducation physique. (1991; in French)
- Cahier de documentation préparé à l'intention des étudiants-es du cours EPH 1382 intitulé Milieux professionnels en éducation physique. (1991; in French)

== Later career ==
Larivière retired as a full-time professor by 1999. Since then, he has served as president of Tennis Québec, lectured at sports-related conferences, and acted as a consultant for sports organizations. By 2012, he became a professor emeritus at the Université de Montréal.

In an interview in 1999, he stated that "hockey is sick" in reference to the development of players in Canada. He noted that minor ice hockey coaches in Quebec volunteered for three years on average, which led to a high turnover rate and lack of a consistent coaching philosophy for the players. He advocated for coaching qualification courses via CEGEP, elimination of sexual abuse cases, and campaigns against performance-enhancing substances. Other problems he noted were participation in hockey as decreasing as players grew older, and the lack of year-round training for elite players compared to Europe.

Larivière co-authored a 2002 study which looked at the physical development of female athletes aged 13 to 15, with respect to the sports of tennis, swimming, figure skating and volleyball. The study concluded that elite athletes developed different physical attributes and athletic abilities according to the sport.

Larivière wrote a review of organized recreational activities for Leisure Quebec in 2008. He noted that increasing competition for participants meant that recreational organizations should undertake quality assessments to ensure the best value and growth. He recommended improvements in management, services, and mentoring of participants as keys to success.

Larivière spoke at the Quebec Hockey Summit, in August 2011, at the Bell Centre. He felt that more options than before had been implemented to retain hockey players in the QMJHL, the Quebec AAA Midget Hockey League and school sports; but "we just need to promote them better". He recommended nurturing an athlete's disposition and aptitude to develop talent. He advocated for better monitoring of physical and mental development, and the ability of a player to make decisions quickly.

Larivière evaluated Judo Québec in 2012. His report was the basis for a strategic development plan implemented from 2013 to 2017, which led to Judo Québec becoming the first provincial organization to earn a sport quality accreditation from Sport Québec.

On January 23, 2013, Larivière was named president of the QMJHL Technical Commission to advise on current league programs, find the best development results for its players, recommend improvements.

== Awards ==
Larivière received of the Gordon Juckes Award from the CAHA in 1986, for outstanding contributions to amateur hockey in Canada.

== Personal life ==
Larivière resided in Saint-Bruno-de-Montarville, Quebec as of 1986, and in Chambly, Quebec, as of 2008.
