= Granby, Quebec (township) =

Coordinates: 45°24′49.1″N 72°43′16.9″W

Granby (township)
- former township
- (Granby, Quebec)
- Interactive map of Granby (township)
- Country: Canada
- Province: Quebec
- Region: Montérégie
- RCM: La Haute-Yamaska
- Merged: January 01, 2007
- Electoral Districts Federal: Shefford
- Provincial: Shefford

Government
  - Mayor: Pascal Bonin
  - Federal MP(s): Robert Vincent (BQ)
  - Quebec MNA(s): François Bonnardel (CAQ)

Area
  - Land: 80.67 km^{2} (31.15 sq mi)

Population (2011)
  - Total: 63,433
  - Density: 145.6/km^{2} (377/sq mi)
  - Change (2001-06): ▲3.6%
  - Dwellings: 4,129
- Time zone: UTC-5 (EST)
  - Summer (DST): UTC-4 (EDT)
- Area code: 450
- Access Routes: R-137

The Township of Granby (French: Canton de Granby) was a township municipality in south-central Quebec, Canada in the La Haute-Yamaska Regional County Municipality. Its territory comprised the northern and western sections of the present-day City of Granby.

In 2006, citizens of the City of Granby and the Township of Granby voted in referendum for the township to merge into the City of Granby. Since January 1, 2007, it is a single city.

According to the Canada 2011 Census:

- Population: 63,433

According to the Canada 2001 Census:

- Population: 11,335
- % Change (1996-2001): 0.6
- Dwellings: 3,810
- Area (km².): 80.67
- Density (persons per km².): 140.5

== Communities ==
- Mawcook—Near Rivière Mawcook, northwestern area of the township.

== See also ==
- 21st-century municipal history of Quebec
- Town of Granby
