= Jocelyn Gauvreau =

Canadian ice hockey player

- Born: March 4, 1964 (age 61); Masham, QC, Canada
- Height: 5 ft 11 in (180 cm)
- Weight: 190 lb (86 kg; 13 st 8 lb)
- Position: Defense
- Shot: Left
- Played for: Montreal Canadiens
- National team: Canada
- NHL draft: 31st overall, 1982; Montreal Canadiens
- Playing career: 1982–1985

Joseph Jocelyn Gauvreau (born March 4, 1964) is a Canadian retired professional ice hockey defenceman who played two games in the National Hockey League for the Montreal Canadiens.

Gauvreau was born in Masham, Quebec.

== Career statistics ==
			Regular season					Playoffs
Season	Team	League	GP	G	A	Pts	PIM	GP	G	A	Pts	PIM
1980–81	Hull Olympiques	QMJHL	54	12	12	24	55	—	—	—	—	—
1981–82	Hull Olympiques	QMJHL	19	5	8	13	8	—	—	—	—	—
1981–82	Granby Bisons	QMJHL	33	12	21	33	64	14	3	10	13	16
1982–83	Granby Bisons	QMJHL	68	33	63	96	44	—	—	—	—	—
1982–83	Nova Scotia Voyageurs	AHL	1	0	0	0	0	5	0	1	1	0
1983–84	Granby Bisons	QMJHL	58	19	39	58	53	4	2	3	5	0
1983–84	Nova Scotia Voyageurs	AHL	1	0	2	2	0	3	1	1	2	0
1983–84	Montreal Canadiens	NHL	2	0	0	0	0	—	—	—	—	—
1984–85	Sherbrooke Canadiens	AHL	10	1	2	3	4	—	—	—	—	—
NHL totals			2	0	0	0	0	—	—	—	—	—
AHL totals			12	1	4	5	4	8	1	2	3	0
