= Granby, Quebec =

Granby
- Town
- Ville de Granby
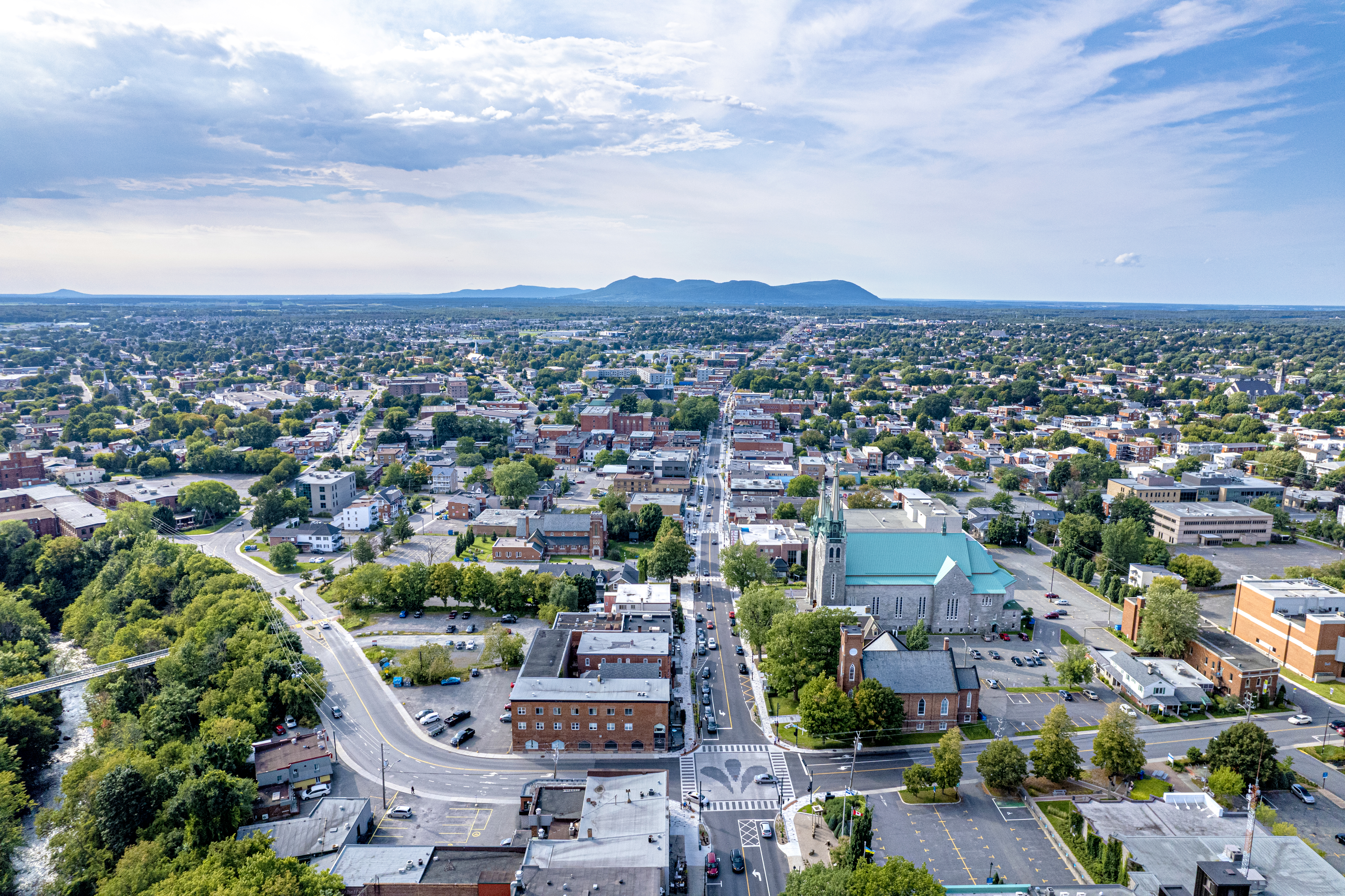
- Aerial view of Granby

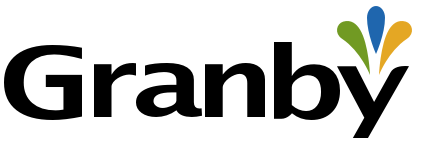
- Coat of arms Logo
- Motto: Pour y parvenir (To get there)
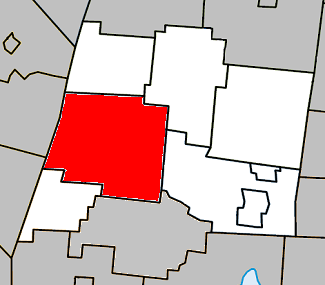
- Location within La Haute-Yamaska RCM

- Location in southern Quebec
- Coordinates: 45°24′N 72°44′W
- Country: Canada
- Province: Quebec
- Region: Estrie
- RCM: La Haute-Yamaska
- Constituted: January 1, 2007

Government
  - Mayor: Julie Bourdon
  - Federal riding: Shefford
  - Prov. riding: Granby

Area
  - Town: 156.10 km^{2} (60.27 sq mi)
  - Land: 152.69 km^{2} (58.95 sq mi)
  - Urban: 50.08 km^{2} (19.34 sq mi)
  - Metro: 494.10 km^{2} (190.77 sq mi)

Population (2021)
  - Town: 69,025
  - Density: 452.1/km^{2} (1,171/sq mi)
  - Urban: 63,810
  - Urban density: 1,274.2/km^{2} (3,300/sq mi)
  - Metro: 90,833
  - Metro density: 183.8/km^{2} (476/sq mi)
- Time zone: UTC−5 (EST)
  - Summer (DST): UTC−4 (EDT)
- Postal code(s): J2G-J2J
- Area codes: 450 and 579
- Highways: R-112; R-137; R-139
- Website: www.granby.ca

Granby (Canadian French: [ɡʁanbi]) is a town in the southwestern region of Quebec east of Montreal. According to the latest statistics from the 2021 Canadian Census, Granby has a population of 69,025. It is the administrative center of La Haute-Yamaska Regional County Municipality and is the second most populous city in the Eastern Townships after Sherbrooke. The town's name is derived from John Manners, Marquess of Granby. One of the town's main attractions is the Granby Zoo, and its well-known Lac Boivin fountain, also a notable landmark of the area. The mayor, Julie Bourdon, was elected on November 7, 2021, being the first female mayor of Granby.

== History ==
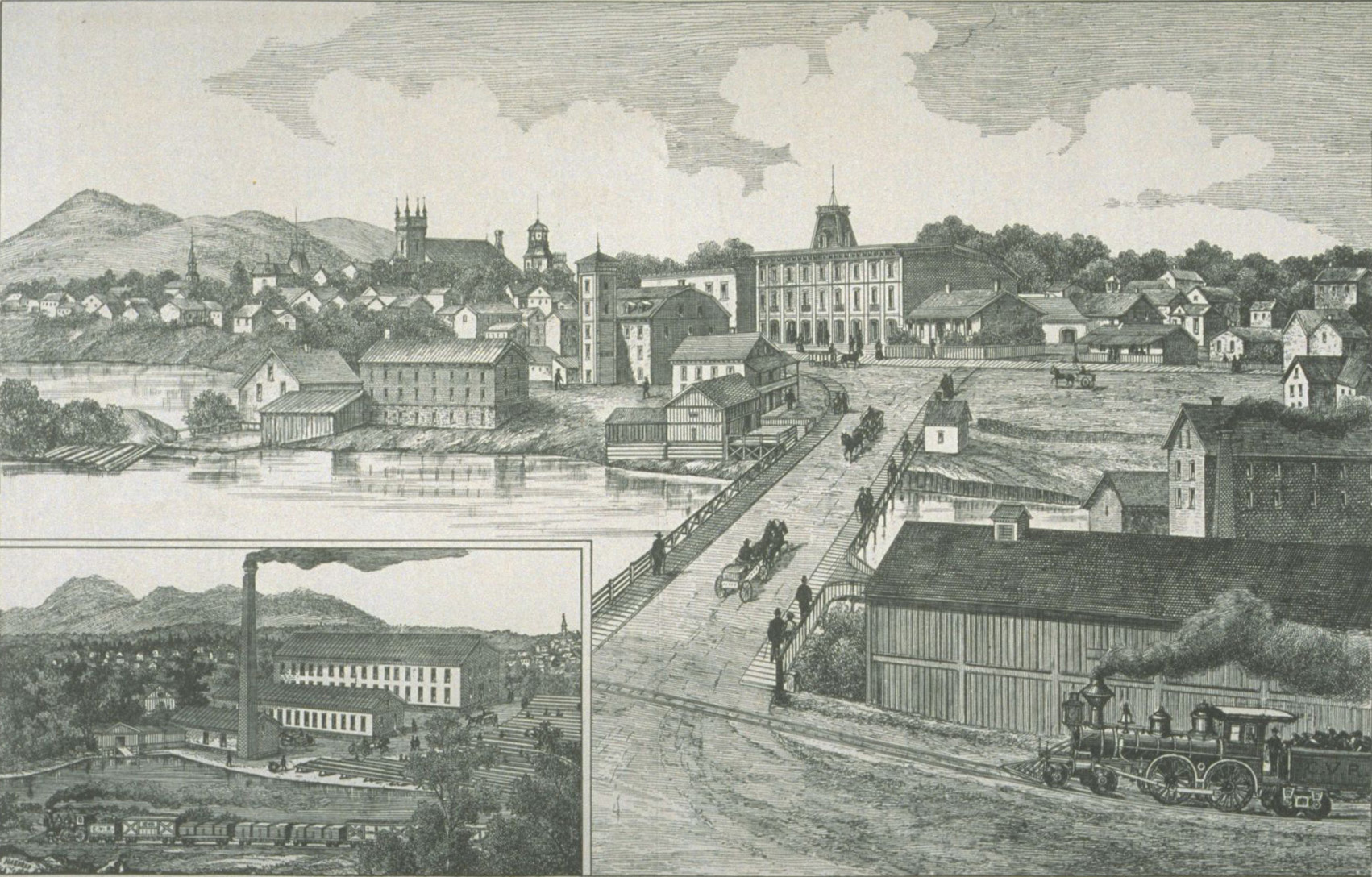
The town of Granby seen in 1883.

Granby’s terrain, frequently characterized as a natural prairie, historically dotted with natural meadows and a rich tapestry of forests, was home to a variety of trees such as ash, fir, maple, hemlock, and birch. Not far from these woods, a small swamp could be found, nestled a short distance uphill. Over time, this land was traversed by Indigenous peoples, whose presence was intertwined with the area’s nomadic history.

In 1792, the Eastern Townships were officially opened for colonization by Loyalists. Subsequently, on January 29, 1803, Colonel Henry Caldwell and his 97 associates were granted the Township of Granby by the Executive Council of Quebec. The township’s first settler, John Horner, arrived in 1813 and established a sawmill adjacent to the Yamaska River. By 1825, Horner, in partnership with Richard Frost, expanded his enterprise to include a general store. That same year, Frost was responsible for drafting the township’s official plans.

Granby received official incorporation as a municipality in the year of 1816, marking its status as a town in 1971.

Field areas have been exploited for agricultural use and the North Yamaska river's flow has been used for its hydraulic energy since the construction of a first dam in 1815 by large industrial companies; the use of dams along the stream has provoked the formation of a large shallow swamp, called Lac Boivin, often cited as one of Granby's landmarks.

In May 2006, the citizens of Granby and Granby Township held a referendum on a possible merger. A majority of citizens of the two municipalities approved the merger, which took effect on January 1, 2007.

== Geography ==
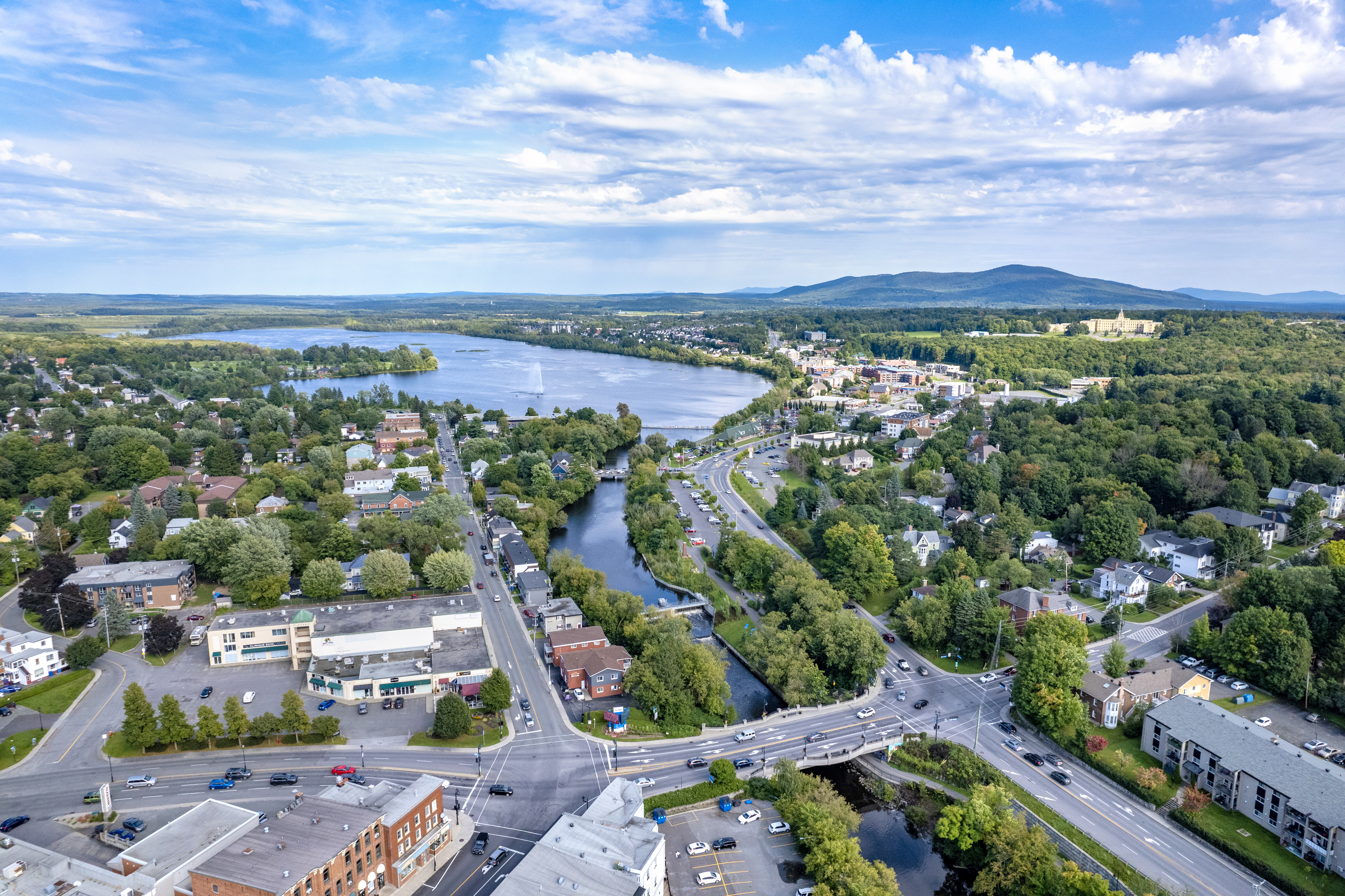
Boivin Lake and Yamaska River

Granby is a flat region located approximately halfway between Montreal and Sherbrooke along Autoroute 10; historically a land covered by forests and prairies, it has transformed into an urbanized core surrounded by fields and suburban neighbourhoods. The North Yamaska river, which crosses lake Boivin (this lake took shape after the construction of a series of dams and later changed into a large swamp praised for its biodiversity. It connects to nearby villages by a network of roads and has two access points from the highway at exit 68 (through Saint-Alphonse-de-Granby) and 74 (via Bromont).

=== Parks and green spaces ===
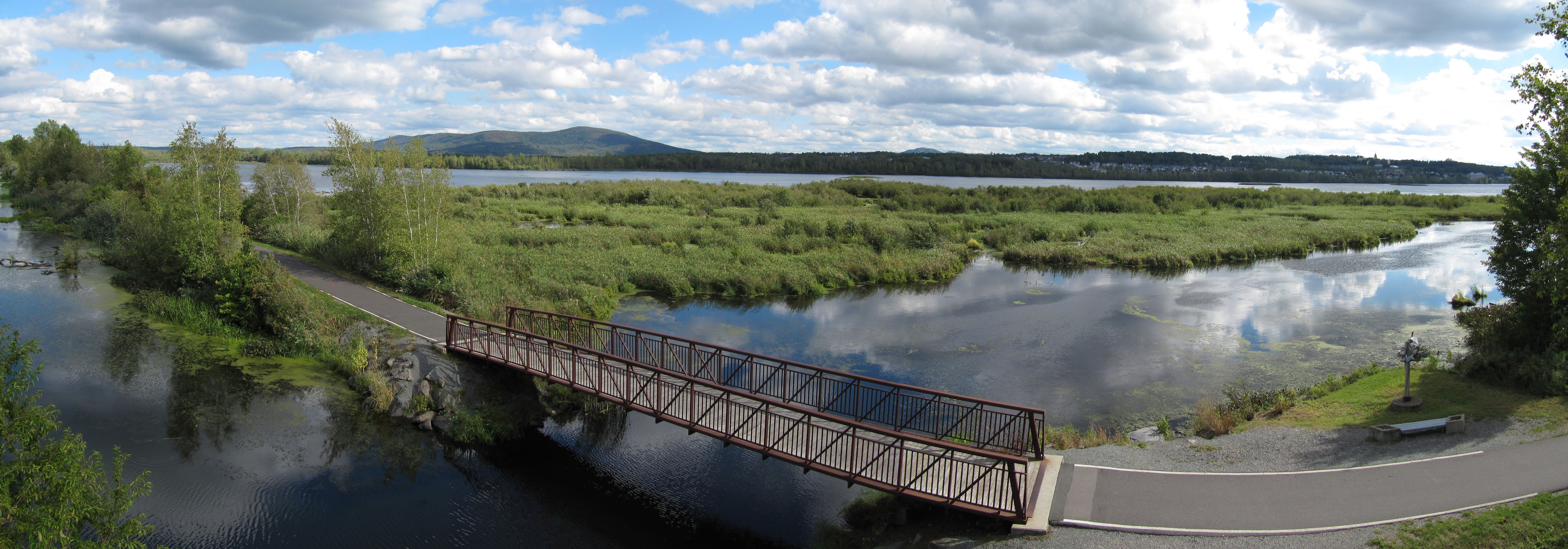
A panorama of lake Boivin and its bicycle track.

Granby has many parks and fountains, including the Daniel-Johnson, Victoria, Terry Fox, Miner, Pelletier, and Kennedy parks.

- Lake Boivin, Daniel-Johnson park, and the Centre d'interprétation de la nature du lac Boivin (nature interpretation centre of lake Boivin), take shape in the 1980s, landscaped with paths all around for bikers and pedestrians, they have become a haven for Nature's lovers as they harbour abundant wildlife. Lake Boivin has park Daniel-Johnson on its northern shores, from which citizens and tourists can practice recreational sports such as navigation and cycling, the park also hosts events for Saint-Jean-Baptiste and Earth Day; as well as a self-proclaimed fête de la rivière (river festival) to honour and clean the North Yamaska River; characteristic hills on the park's premises are very popular for picnicking during the summer and sledding in the winter. The Centre d'interprétation de la nature du lac Boivin is a non-profit devoted to conservation of the territory, habitat, fauna and flora of lake Boivin.
- Yamaska National Park is a vast protected wetland around the Choinière reservoir with forest, beach, walking and biking paths, as well as navigable waters (only light non-motorized vessels are permitted); it is an important bird sanctuary.
- Park Victoria is the oldest park in Granby. The park opened in 1889 and is named in honour of Queen Victoria (1876-1901). There are war memorials to Latimer (1901), to the soldiers killed in the Second Boer War, and a monument to the Braves. Selbach fountain, inaugurated in 1982, rises on the corner of Dufferin street and Mountain boulevard. Two ponds connected by a small stream, large rock outcrops, and a hilly terrain are its main geographical characteristics; its northeastern tip is bisected by Lorne street; at its southernmost limits, the park borders Parkview Elementary School, an English-language school. In the warm months, free concerts are sometimes played in a gazebo.
- Park Miner is the second oldest park in Granby; it was given to the town by mayor Stephen Henderson Campbell Miner in 1910; today, it lies downtown and houses Piscine Miner (Miner pool), the municipal indoor public pool. A monument to the founders of Saint-Jean-Baptiste society was erected in 1934. The first community public art gallery in the region is installed by Atelier 19 to celebrate its ten years.During the summer, the park has tents installed to house different public activities such as dance and music.
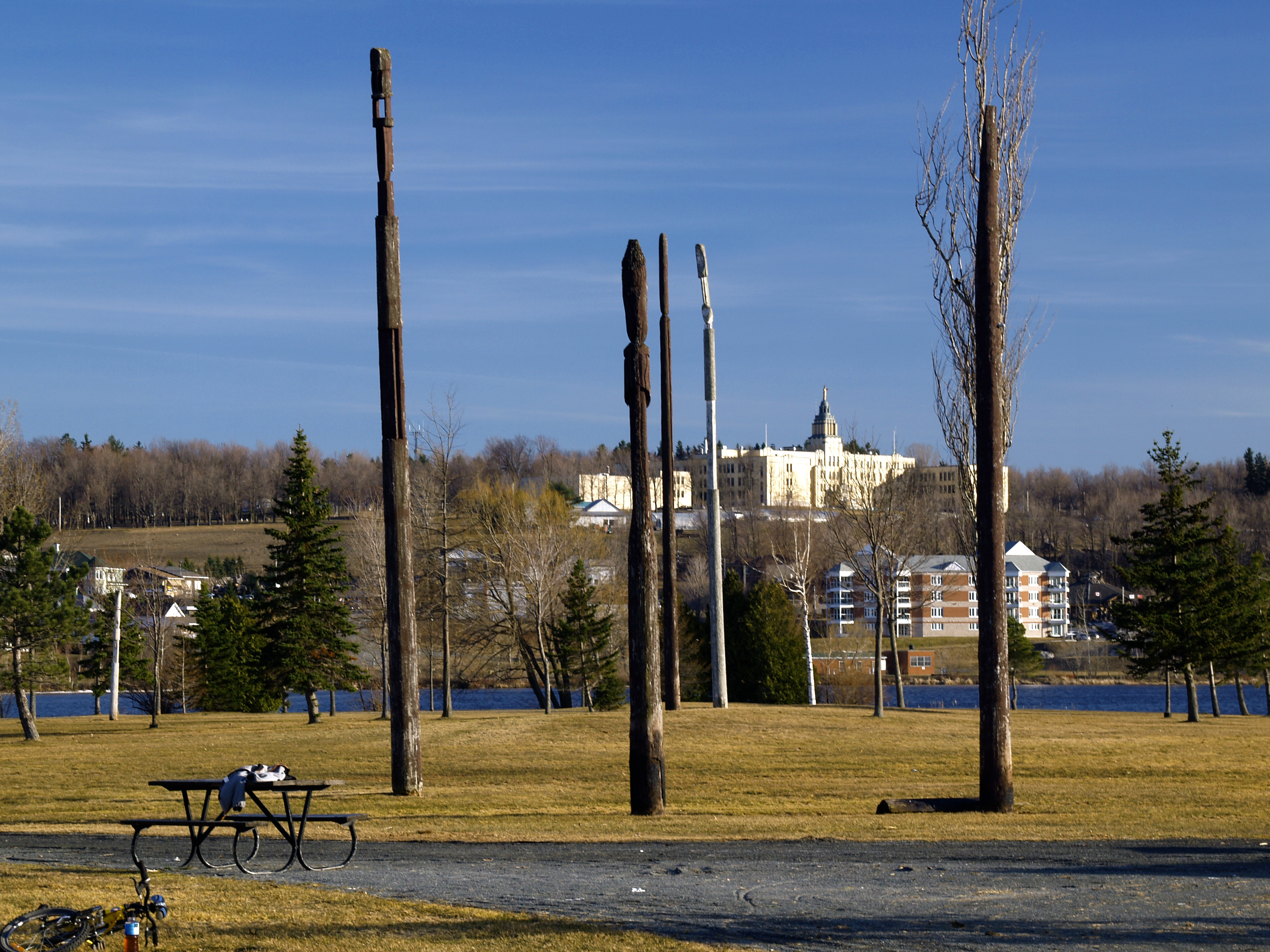
Daniel-Johnson park

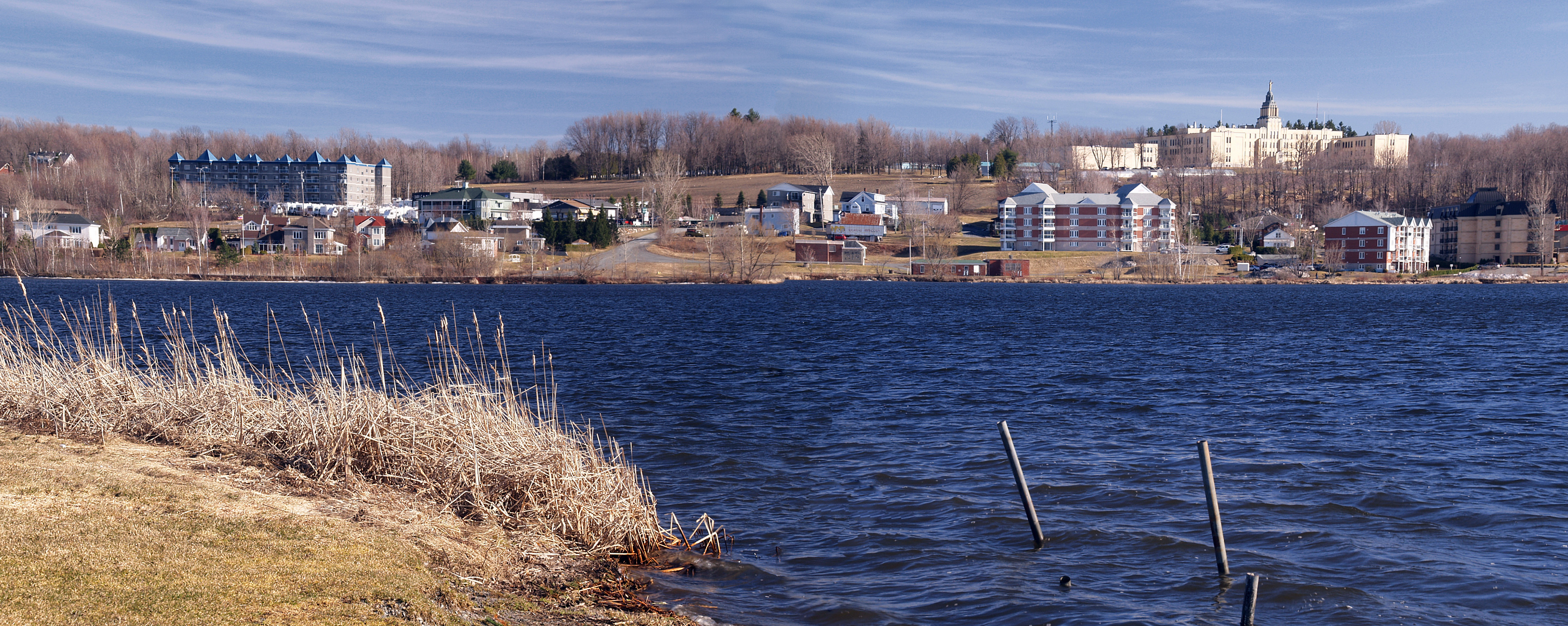
Lake Boivin

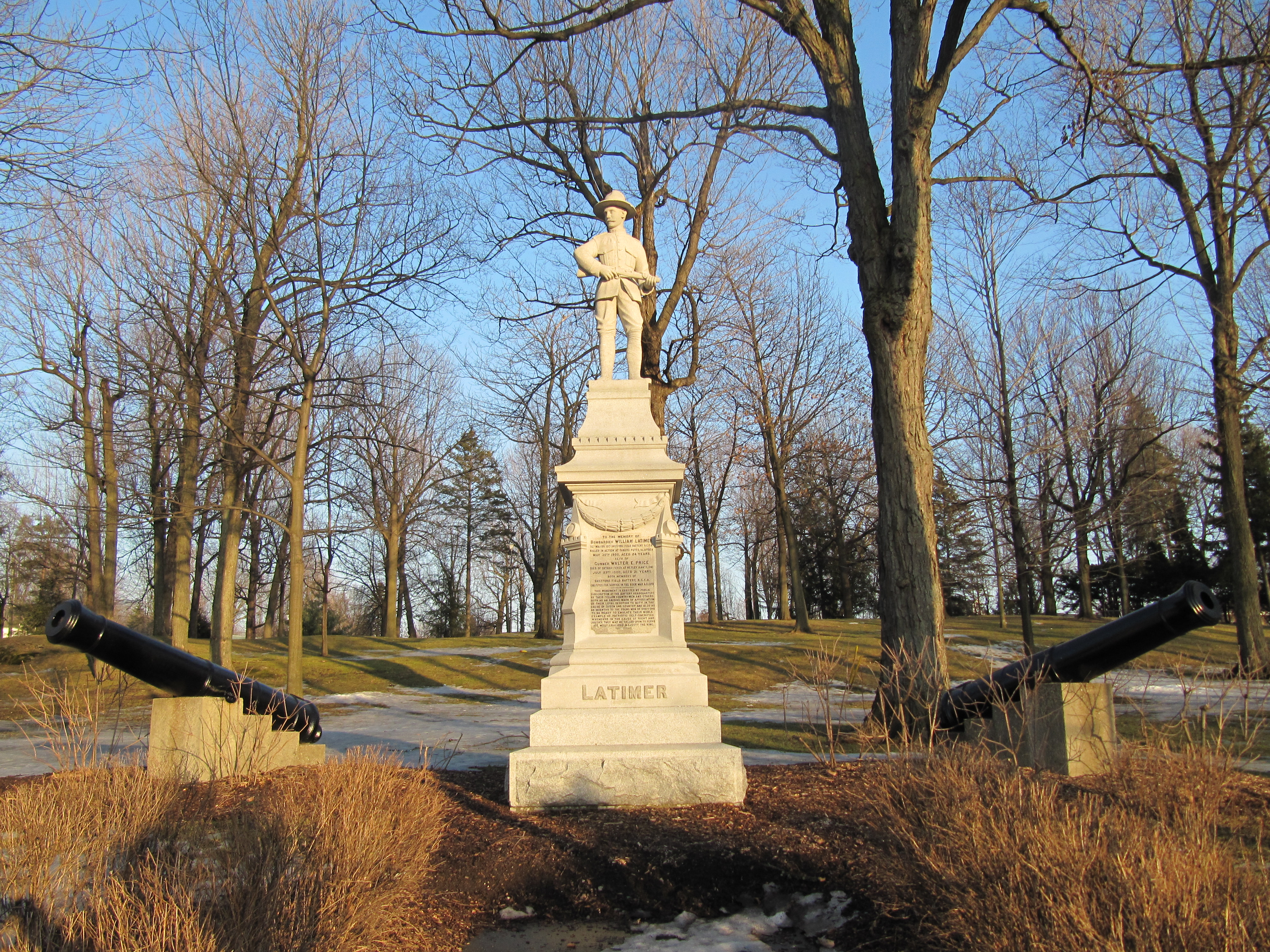
Monument to Latimer at park Victoria

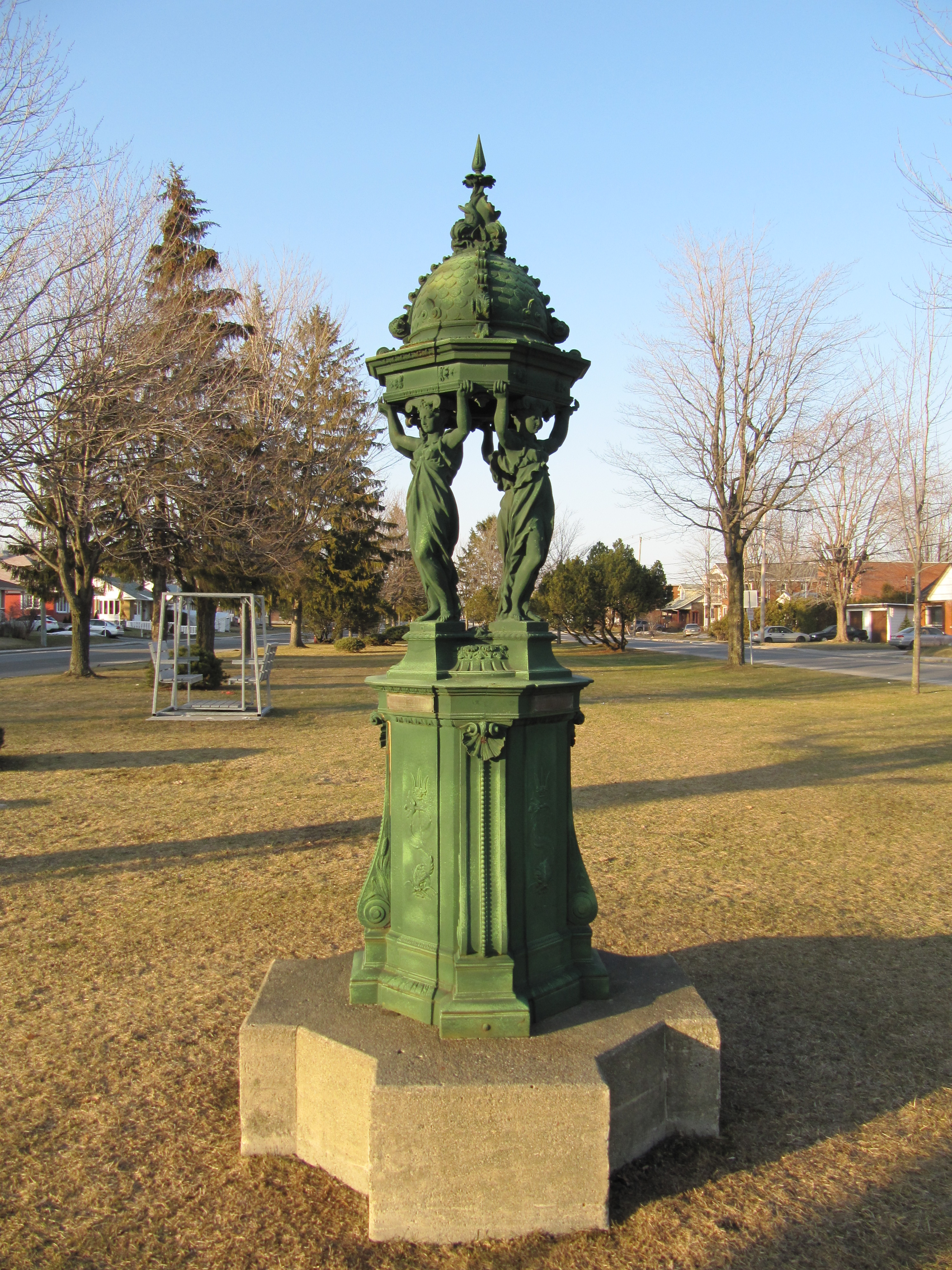
Wallace fountain at Isabelle park.

=== Climate ===
Granby has a humid continental climate (Dfb). It has significant variations of temperature with four distinct seasons. Summers are warm but short and winters are very cold. Transitional seasons have significant variations of temperature between adjacent months. Precipitation is quite high, resulting in rainy summers and snowy winters.

Climate data for Granby (1991–2020 normals, extremes 1917–present)
Month	Jan	Feb	Mar	Apr	May	Jun	Jul	Aug	Sep	Oct	Nov	Dec	Year
Record high °C (°F)	17.5 (63.5)	18.0 (64.4)	25.0 (77.0)	30.0 (86.0)	34.7 (94.5)	34.4 (93.9)	39.4 (102.9)	35.6 (96.1)	33.9 (93.0)	28.9 (84.0)	23.9 (75.0)	19.0 (66.2)	39.4 (102.9)
Mean daily maximum °C (°F)	−4.6 (23.7)	−3.2 (26.2)	2.2 (36.0)	10.5 (50.9)	18.7 (65.7)	23.3 (73.9)	25.6 (78.1)	24.6 (76.3)	20.3 (68.5)	12.8 (55.0)	5.8 (42.4)	−1.0 (30.2)	11.3 (52.3)
Daily mean °C (°F)	−9.1 (15.6)	−7.4 (18.7)	−2.2 (28.0)	5.9 (42.6)	13.1 (55.6)	18.3 (64.9)	20.4 (68.7)	19.5 (67.1)	15.4 (59.7)	8.6 (47.5)	2.2 (36.0)	−4.9 (23.2)	6.6 (43.9)
Mean daily minimum °C (°F)	−13.4 (7.9)	−11.9 (10.6)	−6.4 (20.5)	0.9 (33.6)	8.0 (46.4)	13.0 (55.4)	15.7 (60.3)	14.8 (58.6)	10.6 (51.1)	4.6 (40.3)	−1.5 (29.3)	−8.4 (16.9)	2.2 (36.0)
Record low °C (°F)	−40.0 (−40.0)	−38.9 (−38.0)	−38.9 (−38.0)	−17.8 (0.0)	−5.0 (23.0)	−1.0 (30.2)	1.7 (35.1)	1.1 (34.0)	−4.4 (24.1)	−11.1 (12.0)	−25.6 (−14.1)	−37.2 (−35.0)	−40.0 (−40.0)
Average precipitation mm (inches)	95.0 (3.74)	73.9 (2.91)	88.0 (3.46)	101.4 (3.99)	100.3 (3.95)	120.6 (4.75)	122.2 (4.81)	112.6 (4.43)	113.4 (4.46)	109.2 (4.30)	91.7 (3.61)	98.1 (3.86)	1,226.4 (48.28)
Average rainfall mm (inches)	34.8 (1.37)	19.8 (0.78)	35.9 (1.41)	84.9 (3.34)	99.4 (3.91)	120.6 (4.75)	122.2 (4.81)	112.6 (4.43)	113.4 (4.46)	105.8 (4.17)	70.5 (2.78)	42.9 (1.69)	962.8 (37.91)
Average snowfall cm (inches)	58.5 (23.0)	57.9 (22.8)	47.9 (18.9)	17.3 (6.8)	0.8 (0.3)	0.0 (0.0)	0.0 (0.0)	0.0 (0.0)	0.0 (0.0)	3.8 (1.5)	21.7 (8.5)	53.7 (21.1)	261.6 (103.0)
Average precipitation days (≥ 0.2 mm)	18.2	14.1	14.6	13.3	13.5	15.1	14.5	12.6	12.1	14.1	15.8	18.0	175.8
Average rainy days (≥ 0.2 mm)	4.6	3.5	6.1	12.0	13.4	15.1	14.5	12.6	12.1	14.0	11.7	6.4	126.0
Average snowy days (≥ 0.2 cm)	15.0	12.7	9.4	3.0	0.25	0.0	0.0	0.0	0.0	0.79	5.8	13.0	60.0
Source: Environment Canada

== Demographics ==
Granby Population
Year	Pop.	±%
1901	4,750	—
1921	6,785	+42.8%
1931	10,587	+56.0%
1941	14,197	+34.1%
1951	21,989	+54.9%
1961	31,463	+43.1%
1971	34,385	+9.3%
1981	37,725	+9.7%
1991	42,804	+13.5%
1996	43,316	+1.2%
2001	44,121	+1.9%
2006	47,637	+8.0%
2011	63,433 (Note: Amalgamation of the city and the township of Granby into the town of Granby on January 1, 2007.)	+33.2%
2016	66,222	+4.4%
2021	69,025	+4.2%

In the 2021 Census of Population conducted by Statistics Canada, Granby had a population of 69,025 living in 31,850 of its 32,766 total private dwellings, a change of 4.2% from its 2016 population of 66,222. With a land area of 152.69 km^{2} (58.95 sq mi), it had a population density of 452.1/km^{2} (1,170.8/sq mi) in 2021.

=== Ethnicity ===
In 2021, 92.5% of the population were white/European, 5.5% were visible minorities and 2.0% were Indigenous. The largest visible minority groups were Black (1.8%), Latin American (1.6%), Arab (0.8%), and West Asian (0.5%).

Panethnic groups in the City of Granby (2001−2021)
Panethnic group	2021		2016		2011		2006		2001	
Panethnic group	Pop.	%	Pop.	%	Pop.	%	Pop.	%	Pop.	%
European (Note: Statistic includes all persons that did not make up part of a visible minority or an indigenous identity.)	61,645	92.57%	60,435	94.42%	59,200	96.29%	44,915	97.43%	42,145	98.86%
Indigenous	1,310	1.97%	715	1.12%	425	0.69%	165	0.36%	90	0.21%
African	1,200	1.8%	830	1.3%	500	0.81%	275	0.6%	125	0.29%
Latin American	1,080	1.62%	1,045	1.63%	585	0.95%	405	0.88%	65	0.15%
Middle Eastern (Note: Statistic includes total responses of "West Asian" and "Arab" under visible minority section on census.)	835	1.25%	640	1%	380	0.62%	190	0.41%	70	0.16%
Southeast Asian (Note: Statistic includes total responses of "Filipino" and "Southeast Asian" under visible minority section on census.)	210	0.32%	135	0.21%	140	0.23%	80	0.17%	85	0.2%
East Asian (Note: Statistic includes total responses of "Chinese", "Korean", and "Japanese" under visible minority section on census.)	130	0.2%	105	0.16%	110	0.18%	65	0.14%	45	0.11%
South Asian	70	0.11%	70	0.11%	65	0.11%	0	0%	0	0%
Other/multiracial (Note: Statistic includes total responses of "Visible minority, n.i.e." and "Multiple visible minorities" under visible minority section on census.)	110	0.17%	50	0.08%	75	0.12%	30	0.07%	10	0.02%
Total responses	66,590	96.47%	64,005	96.65%	61,480	96.92%	46,100	96.77%	42,630	96.62%
Total population	69,025	100%	66,222	100%	63,433	100%	47,637	100%	44,121	100%
Note: Totals greater than 100% due to multiple origin responses

=== Language ===
91.8% of residents spoke French as a mother tongue. Other common first languages were English (2.1%), Spanish (1.6%), Arabic (0.6%), and Persian languages (0.4%). 1.0% of residents listed both French and English as their mother tongues, while 0.4% listed both French and a non-official language.

Mother tongue language (2021)
Language	Population	Pct (%)
French only	62,150	91.8%
English only	1,435	2.1%
Both English and French	705	1.0%
Other languages	3,025	4.5%

=== Religion ===
69.0% of residents were Christian, down from 87.2% in 2011. 61.6% were Catholic, 4.3% were Christian n.o.s., and 1.4% were Protestant. Other Christian denominations and Christian-related traditions accounted for 1.6% of the population. Non-religious and secular people were 28.9% of the population, up from 11.3% in 2011. 2.1% of residents followed other religions, up from 1.5% in 2011. The largest non-Christian religion was Islam (1.7%).

== Economy ==
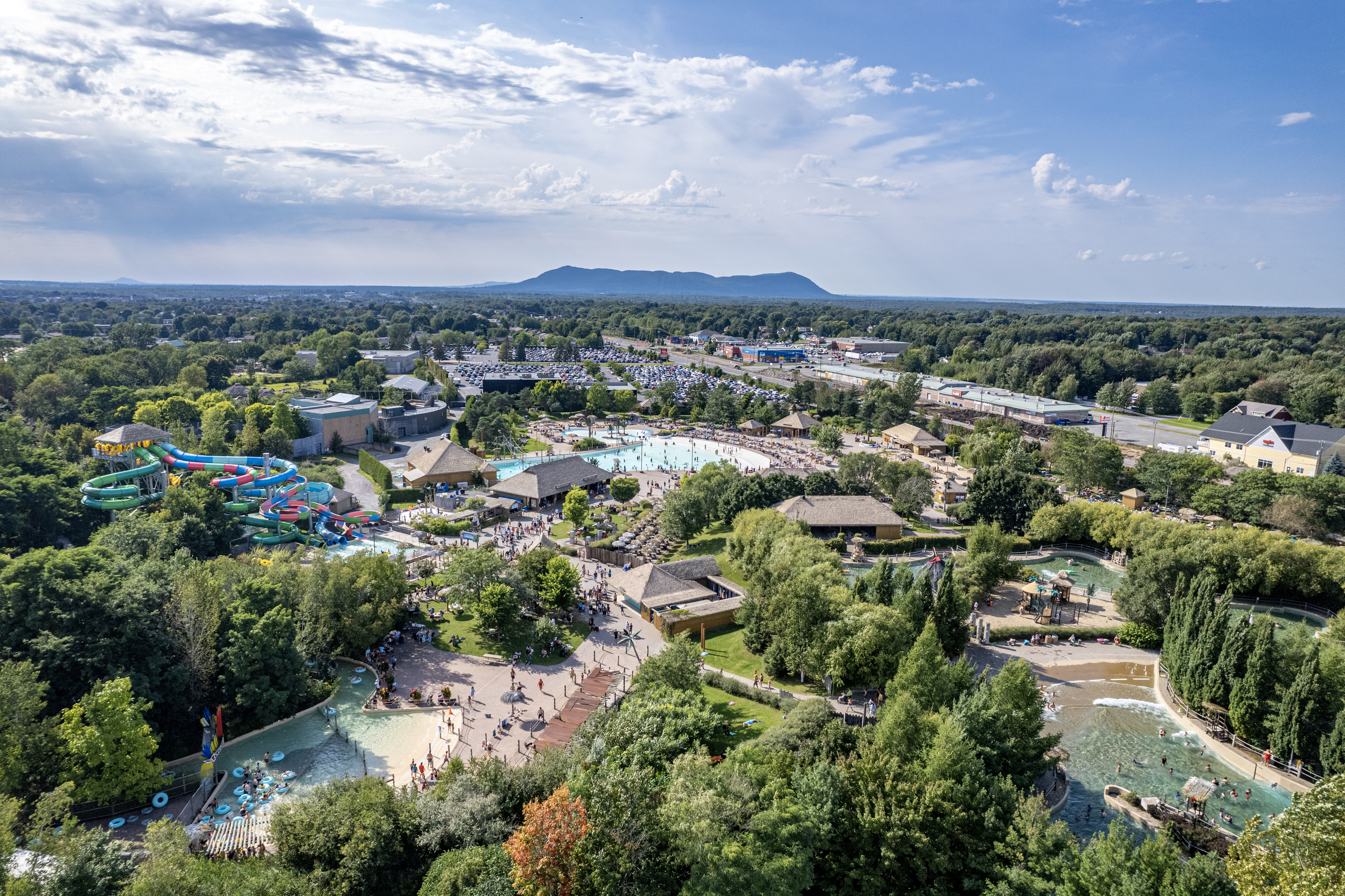
Granby Zoo

Granby is a regional centre for industries (textile, lumber, dairy products) and commercial zone, but is also a tourist town, due to the presence of the important Granby Zoo, founded by the Mayor Horace Boivin. It hosts a Fête des Mascottes ("Mascot Festival") each year in July.

== Attractions ==
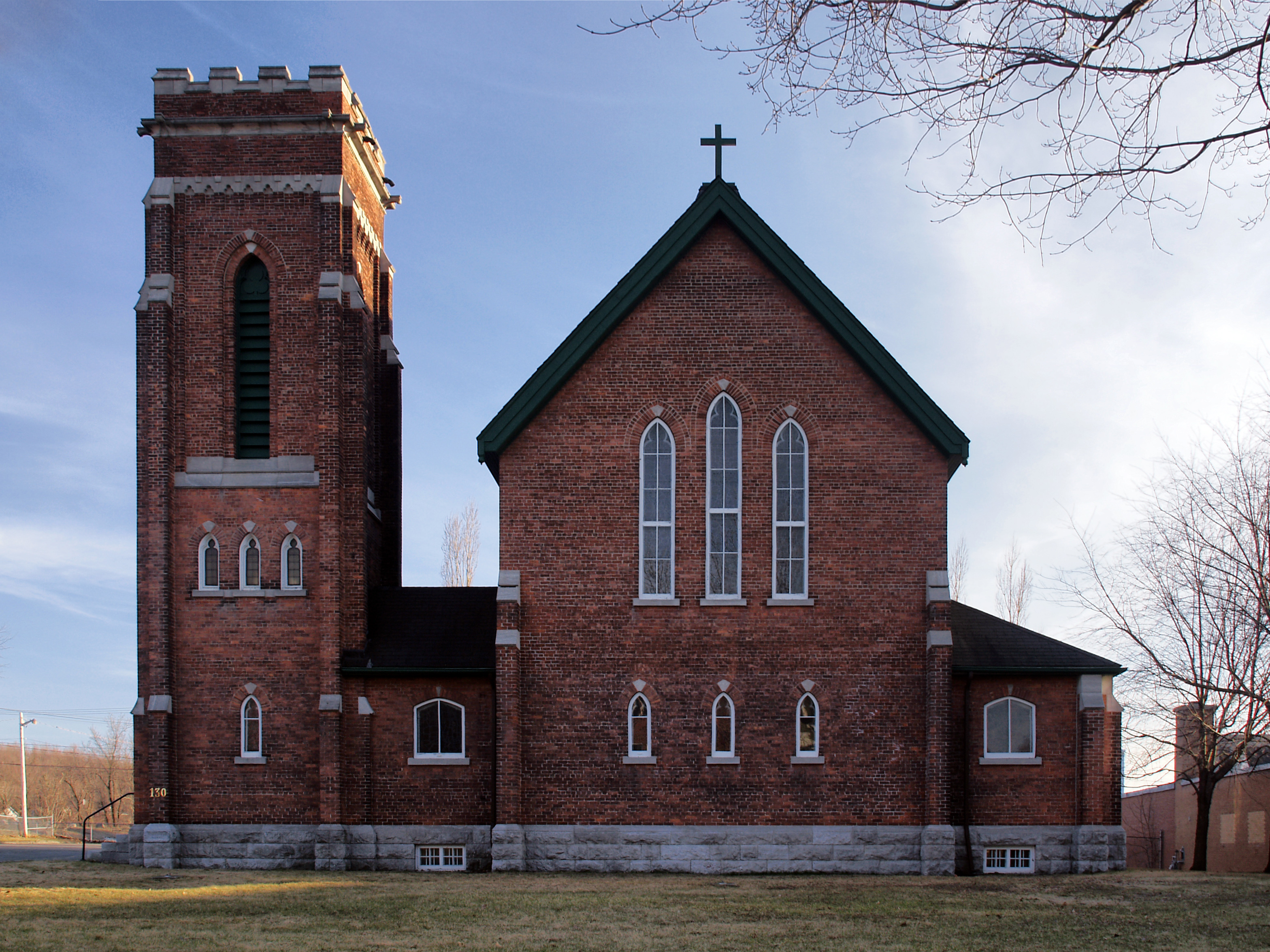
St. George's Anglican Church.

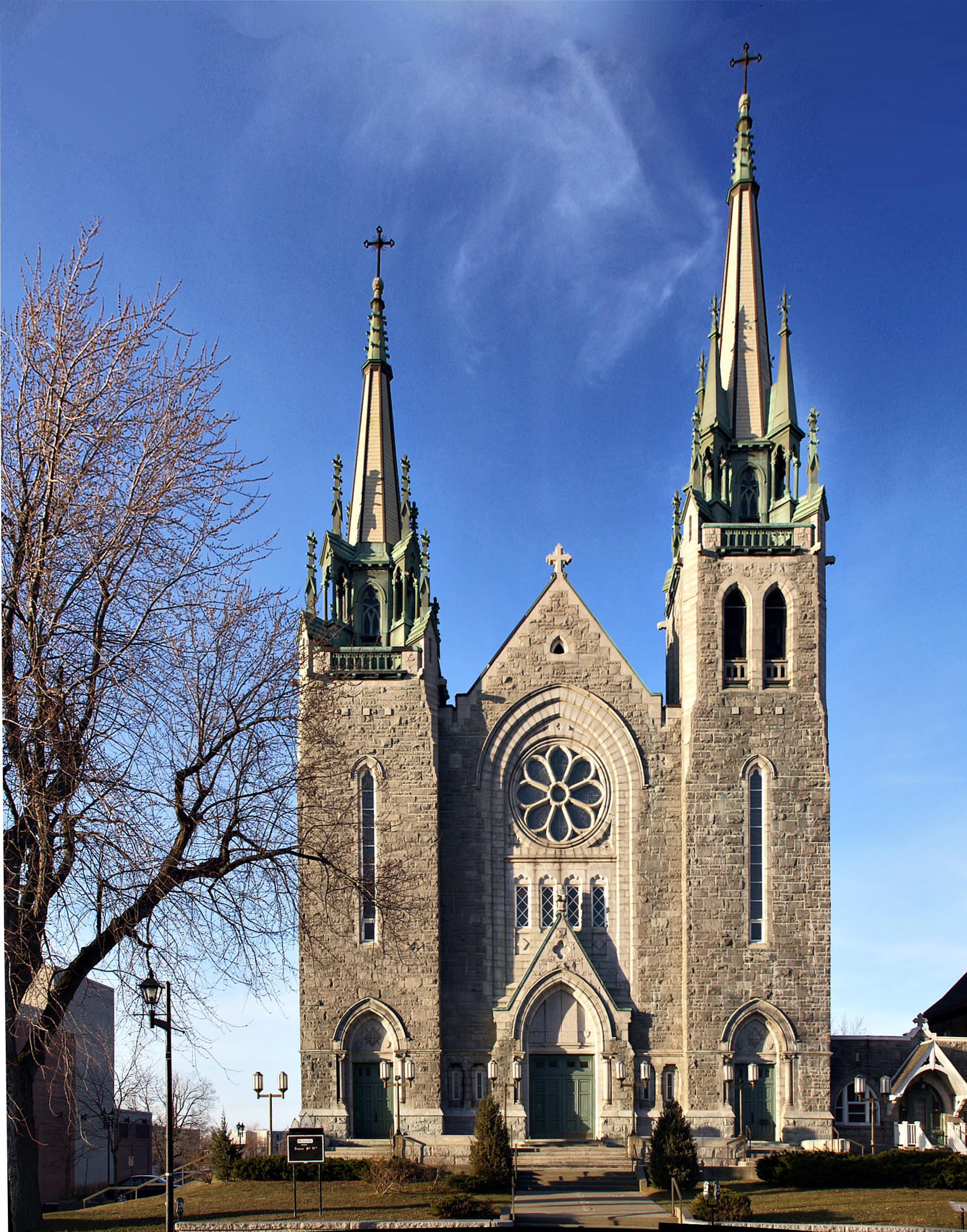
Église Sainte-Famille.

Granby is the host of the yearly "Festival de la chanson de Granby" ("Granby Song Festival") in which many well-known artists, such as Jean Leloup and Luc De Larochellière, have first gained public exposure.

The international classic car show takes place at parc Daniel-Johnston, with over 2500 antiques, vintage, hot rods, muscle cars and classic imports cars every summer. Granby's annual classic car show

Granby is also home to the Galeries de Granby regional shopping mall which has over 85 stores and restaurants.

The Autodrome Granby, one of Canada's largest dirt oval racing tracks, hosts professional racing teams every Friday night from May to September. Winner of many prizes, Autodrome Granby is known worldwide in the racing community. The following categories are on the program: Modified, Sportsman, Pro Stock and Sport Compact.

== Sports ==
Granby is the location of the annual Challenger Banque Nationale de Granby of the ATP Challenger Tour, which takes place at the Club de Tennis des Loisirs de Granby.

The Granby Inouk of the Quebec Junior AAA Hockey League are based in Granby. The Inouk play their home games at the Leonard Grondin Arena.

Granby is also home to the Ligue de Baseball Senior Élite du Québec's Granby Guerriers. The Guerriers play their home games at Napoléon Fontaine Stadium.

From 1981 to 1997, Granby was home to a QMJHL team, originally called the Granby Bisons but changed to the Granby Prédateurs in 1995. The team won the Memorial Cup in 1996. In 1997, the franchise relocated to Sydney, Nova Scotia and became the Cape Breton Screaming Eagles. Both teams played at Léonard Grondin Arena.

== Transport ==
The public transit department of the town is Transport urbain Granby. Until 1956, it was the eastern terminus of the Montreal and Southern Counties Railway's Montreal-Granby Line.

== Sister cities ==
Granby is twinned with:

- Carrefour, Haiti
- Coventry, England, United Kingdom
- Hammam-Lif, Tunisia
- Windsor, Canada

== Notable people ==
- Benoit Coulombe, scientist and researcher.
- Palmer Cox, writer and illustrator of a popular series of children's books about supernatural creatures known as the Brownies, based on Scottish folklore.
- Pierre-Luc Dusseault, the youngest Member of Parliament in Canadian history.
- Rosie Valland, pop singer-songwriter.
- Kim Thúy, writer and novelist (Vietnamese-born, childhood in Granby).
- Félix Pigeon, short track skater, Polish Olympic Team member, Milan 2026.
- Marc Tardif, professional ice hockey player.
- Marc Messier, actor and writer.

== See also ==
- List of census agglomerations by province or territory (Quebec)
- Granby, Quebec (township)
- List of cities in Quebec
- 21st-century municipal history of Quebec
- Granby Consolidated Mining, Smelting and Power Company
