= Frederic Deschênes =

Canadian ice hockey player (born 1976)

- Born: January 12, 1976 (age 50) Quebec City, Quebec, Canada
- Height: 5 ft 9 in (175 cm)
- Weight: 163 lb (74 kg; 11 st 9 lb)
- Position: Goaltender
- Caught: Left
- Played for: Flint Generals; Rochester Americans; Quebec Rafales; Portland Pirates; Birmingham Bulls; Orlando Solar Bears; Johnstown Chiefs; Saint John Flames; Thetford Mines Prolab; Thetford Mines Isothermic; Sainte-Marie Poutrelles Delta; Saint-Georges CRS Express
- NHL draft: 114th overall, 1994; Detroit Red Wings
- Playing career: 1996–2012

Frederic "Freddie" Deschênes (born January 12, 1976) is a Canadian former professional ice hockey goaltender.

== Juniors ==
Deschênes started his career in the QMJHL as a member of the Granby Bisons, who were later known as the Prédateurs. As a member of the Prédateurs during the 1995-96 season, Deschênes won several awards from the CHL, including being named CHL's First Team All-Star. Deschênes also had the lowest goals against average in the QMJHL, which earned him the Jacques Plante Trophy. During the Memorial Cup tournament in 1996, Deschênes was the only goaltender to ever post two shutouts in the same tournament

== Professional ==
Despite being drafted by the Detroit Red Wings in 1994, Deschênes did not see any ice time with the club. Instead, Deschênes rotated through six different teams between the IHL, AHL, and the ECHL. Deschênes signed with the Johnstown Chiefs in the summer of 1999 and stayed with the team until 2002. Nicknamed "The Franchise" by Chiefs' management, Deschênes led the Chiefs to the postseason for the first time in five seasons and appeared in the playoffs in each of his three seasons with the team. During his tenure with the Chiefs, Deschênes also set several all-time and single season team records.

Deschênes returned to Quebec in 2002 and continued his career with Thetford Mines Prolab of the Quebec Semi-Pro Hockey League. He won 29 of a possible 34 games during the 2002-03 season, going 29-4-1 with a 2.10 GAA and a .927 save percentage. Deschênes remained with Thetford Mines until 2008.

He signed with Saint-Georges CRS Express in 2008 and recently won the Futura Cup as a member of the Express in 2010.

== Awards ==
=== CHL ===
- First All-Star Team (1995–1996)
- Goaltender of the Year (1995–1996)
- Most Outstanding Goaltender, Memorial Cup (1995–1996)

=== QMJHL ===
- Jacques Plante Memorial Trophy, (1995–1996)

== Records ==
=== Memorial Cup ===
- Shutouts (single season): 2 (1995–96)

=== Johnstown Chiefs ===
- Appearances (all-time): 152 (1999–2002)
- Shutouts (all-time): 5 (1999–2002)
- Shutouts (post-season): 3 (1999–2002)
- Wins (all-time): 69 (1999–2002)
- Wins (single-season): 25 (tie) (2001–2002, since broken by Ryan Nie during 2007-08 season)

=== LNAH ===
- Shutouts (single-season): 4 (2002–03)
