= Xavier Delisle =

Canadian ice hockey player

- Born: May 24, 1977 (age 48) Quebec City, Quebec, Canada
- Height: 5 ft 11 in (180 cm)
- Weight: 190 lb (86 kg; 13 st 8 lb)
- Position: Centre
- Shot: Right
- Played for: Tampa Bay Lightning; Montreal Canadiens
- NHL draft: 157th overall, 1996; Tampa Bay Lightning
- Playing career: 1997–2006

Xavier Delisle (born May 24, 1977) is a Canadian former professional ice hockey centre.

== Biography ==
Delisle was born in Quebec City, Quebec. As a youth, he played in the 1990 and 1991 Quebec International Pee-Wee Hockey Tournaments with a minor ice hockey team from Sainte-Foy, Quebec City. He was drafted in the sixth round, 157th overall, of the 1996 NHL entry draft by the Tampa Bay Lightning. He played sixteen games in the National Hockey League: two with the Lightning (in the 1998–99 season) and fourteen with the Montreal Canadiens (in the 2000–01 season).

== Career statistics ==
			Regular season					Playoffs
Season	Team	League	GP	G	A	Pts	PIM	GP	G	A	Pts	PIM
1993–94	Granby Bisons	QMJHL	46	11	22	33	25	—	—	—	—	—
1994–95	Granby Bisons	QMJHL	72	18	36	54	48	13	2	6	8	4
1995–96	Granby Predateurs	QMJHL	67	45	75	120	45	20	13	27	40	12
1996–97	Granby Predateurs	QMJHL	59	36	56	92	20	5	1	4	5	6
1997–98	Adirondack Red Wings	AHL	76	10	19	29	47	3	0	0	0	0
1998–99	Tampa Bay Lightning	NHL	2	0	0	0	0	—	—	—	—	—
1998–99	Cleveland Lumberjacks	IHL	77	15	29	44	36	—	—	—	—	—
1999–00	Toledo Storm	ECHL	2	0	1	1	0	—	—	—	—	—
1999–00	Detroit Vipers	IHL	20	2	6	8	18	—	—	—	—	—
1999–00	Quebec Citadelles	AHL	42	17	28	45	8	3	1	2	3	0
2000–01	Montreal Canadiens	NHL	14	3	2	5	6	—	—	—	—	—
2000–01	Quebec Citadelles	AHL	62	18	29	47	34	9	1	5	6	2
2001–02	Quebec Citadelles	AHL	50	8	17	25	19	—	—	—	—	—
2002–03	Augsburger Panther	DEL	28	5	9	14	12	—	—	—	—	—
2003–04	Augsburger Panther	DEL	43	20	16	36	36	—	—	—	—	—
2004–05	Grizzly Adams Wolfsburg	DEL	51	14	18	32	28	—	—	—	—	—
2005–06	Grizzly Adams Wolfsburg	2.GBun	51	28	33	61	45	5	1	0	1	0
NHL totals			16	3	2	5	6	—	—	—	—	—
