= SMPD2 =

Protein-coding gene in the species Homo sapiens

Identifiers
- Aliases: SMPD2, ISC1, NSMASE, NSMASE1, sphingomyelin phosphodiesterase 2
- External IDs: OMIM: 603498; MGI: 1278330; HomoloGene: 31129; GeneCards: SMPD2; OMA:SMPD2 - orthologs

Gene location (Human)
Chr.	Chromosome 6 (human)
Band	6q21	Start	109,440,724 bp
Band	6q21	End	109,443,919 bp

Gene location (Mouse)
Chr.	Chromosome 10 (mouse)
Band	10|10 B1	Start	41,361,638 bp
Band	10|10 B1	End	41,366,365 bp
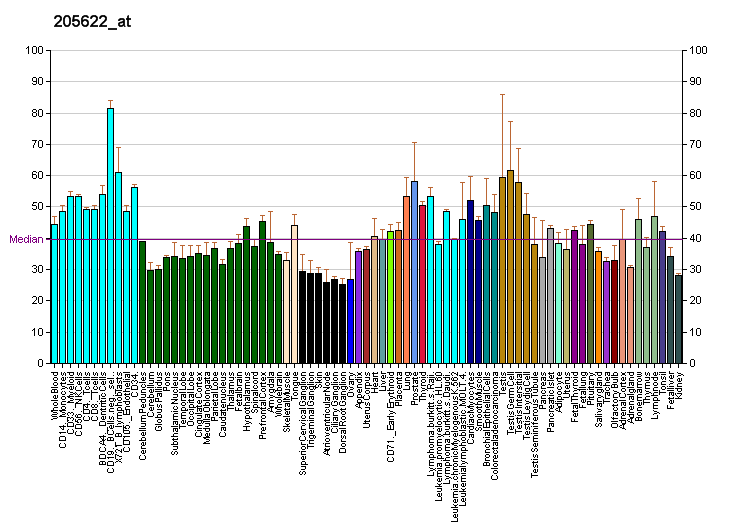
RNA expression pattern
Bgee	Human / Mouse (ortholog); Top expressed in: right uterine tube; left testis; right testis; mucosa of transverse colon; olfactory zone of nasal mucosa; sperm; gingival epithelium; bronchial epithelial cell; granulocyte; skin of abdomen / Top expressed in: right kidney; proximal tubule; yolk sac; human kidney; saccule; jejunum; retinal pigment epithelium; granulocyte; duodenum; neural layer of retina; More reference expression data
BioGPS	More reference expression data
Gene ontology
Molecular function	sphingomyelin phosphodiesterase activity; metal ion binding; hydrolase activity
Cellular component	integral component of membrane; membrane; plasma membrane; integral component of plasma membrane; intracellular anatomical structure; caveola
Biological process	positive regulation of ceramide biosynthetic process; intracellular signal transduction; lipid metabolism; ceramide biosynthetic process; response to mechanical stimulus; sphingomyelin metabolic process; sphingolipid metabolic process; sphingomyelin catabolic process; glycosphingolipid metabolic process
Sources:Amigo / QuickGO
Orthologs
Species	Human	Mouse
Entrez	6610	20598
Ensembl	ENSG00000135587	ENSMUSG00000019822
UniProt	O60906	O70572
RefSeq (mRNA)	NM_003080	NM_009213
RefSeq (protein)	NP_003071	NP_033239
Location (UCSC)	Chr 6: 109.44 – 109.44 Mb	Chr 10: 41.36 – 41.37 Mb
PubMed search
- Wikidata
View/Edit Human	View/Edit Mouse

Sphingomyelin phosphodiesterase 2 is an enzyme that in humans is encoded by the SMPD2 gene.
