= Enrico Calcaterra =

Italian ice hockey player and executive (1905–1994)

- Born: 1 January 1905; Milan, Italy
- Died: 8 June 1994 (aged 89)
- Children: 1
- Honors: IIHF Hall of Fame (1999)
Ice hockey career
- National team: Italy
- Playing career: 1924–1938

Enrico Calcaterra (1 January 1905 – 8 June 1994) was an Italian ice hockey goaltender and executive. Calcaterra represented Italy internationally at four IIHF World Championships. In 1999, Calcaterra became the first Italian sportsperson to be inducted into the IIHF Hall of Fame. He is considered the pioneer of Italian hockey.

== Career ==
In 1924, Calcaterra joined the newly made HC Milano along with Frank Roncarelli and Leon Quaglia. With this team, he won nine national championships and eventually played for the Italy men's national ice hockey team during the 1926 IIHF European Championship and several Ice Hockey World Championships. He was also part of the team at the 1936 Winter Olympics, but he did not play any games. As a player in 1933, Calcaterra became the Italian delegate at the IIHF congresses and sat on the Italian Olympic Committee. He officially retired from playing hockey in 1938.

After World War II, he served as the president of the Italian Ice Sport Federation (Federazione Italiana Hockey su Ghiaccio (FIGH)) from 1946 to 1952. In 1952, FIHG and the Federazione Italiana Pattinaggio were merged into the Federazione Italiana Sport del Ghiaccio (FISG), with Remo Vigorelli serving as its first president. Calcaterra took over from Vigorelli in 1960. Calcaterra retired as the Italian delegate in 1968 and retired as President of the FISG a few years later in 1972.

Calcaterra died on 8 June 1994. He was posthumously inducted to the IIHF Hall of Fame as a builder in 1999.

== Personal life ==
Off the ice, Calcaterra also worked as a doctor. He had one son after he retired from ice hockey, named Emanuele, who is a chartered accountant and auditor.
