= Granby Bisons =

- City: Granby, Quebec
- League: Quebec Major Junior Hockey League
- Operated: 1981 to 1995
- Home arena: Arena Leonard Grondin

Franchise history
- 1969–77: Sorel Éperviers
- 1977–79: Verdun Éperviers
- 1979–80: Sorel/Verdun Éperviers
- 1980–81: Sorel Éperviers
- 1981–95: Granby Bisons
- 1995–97: Granby Prédateurs
- 1997–2019: Cape Breton Screaming Eagles
- 2019–present: Cape Breton Eagles

The Granby Bisons were a Canadian junior ice hockey team based in Granby, Quebec, and played in the Quebec Major Junior Hockey League (QMJHL). The team was founded in 1981 after they moved from Sorel-Tracy, Quebec, where they had previously been known as the Sorel Éperviers. The Bisons played at Arena Leonard Grondin in Granby. In 1995 the team was renamed the Granby Prédateurs. As of 2019, the team is known as the Cape Breton Eagles.

Notable former Bisons include Patrick Roy, Pierre Turgeon.

== History ==
Georges Larivière was named head coach of the Bisons for the 1985–86 QMJHL season. His appointment was described by The Washington Post as "part of a bold experiment for the next two years" and as "part of a research project" for his work at the Université de Montréal.

== Season-by-season record ==
- Granby Bisons (1981–1995)
- Granby Prédateurs (1995–1997)

OL = Overtime loss, Pct = Winning percentage

Season	Games	Won	Lost	Tied	OL	Points	Pct	Goals for	Goals against	Standing
1981–82	64	14	49	1	–	29	0.227	271	454	8th, QMJHL
1982–83	70	20	48	2	–	42	0.300	343	469	6th, Lebel
1983–84	70	31	38	1	–	63	0.450	308	348	5th, Lebel
1984–85	68	22	43	2	1	47	0.338	328	428	6th, Dilio
1985–86	72	23	46	3	–	49	0.340	333	444	5th, Dilio
1986–87	70	48	18	4	–	100	0.714	416	318	1st, Dilio
1987–88	70	23	44	3	–	49	0.350	294	370	4th, Lebel
1988–89	70	32	35	3	–	67	0.479	286	327	7th, QMJHL
1989–90	70	20	49	1	–	41	0.293	227	340	10th, QMJHL
1990–91	70	34	30	6	–	74	0.529	227	231	5th, Lebel
1991–92	70	25	42	3	–	53	0.379	291	355	5th, Lebel
1992–93	70	23	46	1	–	47	0.336	288	414	6th, Lebel
1993–94	72	30	40	2	–	62	0.431	297	309	6th, Lebel
1994–95	72	31	36	5	–	67	0.465	314	294	4th, Lebel
1995–96	70	56	12	2	–	114	0.814	389	191	1st, Lebel
1996–97	70	44	20	6	–	94	0.671	304	210	2nd, Lebel

== NHL alumni ==
- Serge Aubin
- Philippe Audet
- Joel Baillargeon
- Jesse Bélanger
- Éric Bertrand
- Philippe Boucher
- François Breault
- Martin Brochu
- Marc Bureau
- Alain Côté
- Ed Courtenay
- Xavier Delisle
- Éric Desjardins
- Jocelyn Gauvreau
- Claude Houde
- Daniel Lacroix
- Christian Matte
- Stéphane Quintal
- André Racicot
- Stéphane Richer
- Marc Rodgers
- Patrick Roy
- Stéphane Roy
- Everett Sanipass
- Martin Simard
- Pierre Turgeon
