= Daniel Brière =

Canadian ice hockey player (born 1977)

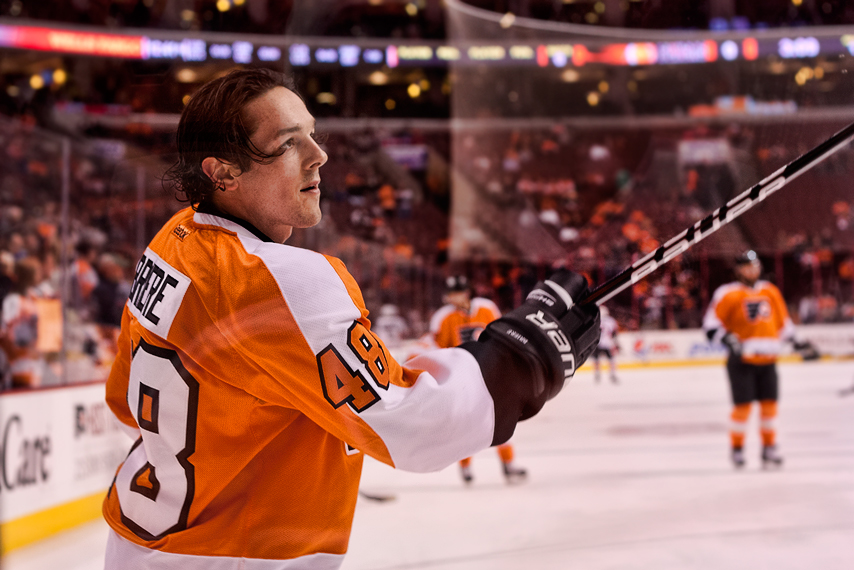
- Brière with the Philadelphia Flyers in 2012
- Born: October 6, 1977 (age 49) Gatineau, Quebec, Canada
- Height: 5 ft 9 in (175 cm)
- Weight: 174 lb (79 kg; 12 st 6 lb)
- Position: Centre
- Shot: Right
- Played for: Phoenix Coyotes; Buffalo Sabres; SC Bern; Philadelphia Flyers; Eisbären Berlin; Montreal Canadiens; Colorado Avalanche
- National team: Canada
- NHL draft: 24th overall, 1996; Phoenix Coyotes
- Playing career: 1997–2015

Daniel Jean-Claude Brière (born October 6, 1977) is a Canadian former professional ice hockey player and current general manager of the Philadelphia Flyers. He was drafted in the first round of the 1996 NHL entry draft by the Phoenix Coyotes, and also played for the Buffalo Sabres, Philadelphia Flyers, Montreal Canadiens and Colorado Avalanche of the National Hockey League (NHL).

He is best known as one of the top Stanley Cup playoffs performers in NHL history, with 116 points in 124 career playoff games.

Internationally, Brière won four gold medals in as many appearances with Canada national teams at the 1994 World U18 Championships, 1997 World Junior Championships, and the 2003 and 2004 World Championships.

== Playing career ==
=== Junior ===
Growing up and playing hockey in his hometown Gatineau, Brière played Bantam hockey in 1992–93 for the Abitibi Regents before graduating to the AAA Gatineau Intrepide of the Quebec Midget League for the 1993–94 season. In his first season with the Intrepide, the team captured the bronze medal at the 1994 Air Canada Cup, where Briere was the top scorer and named Top Forward. Soon after, he was drafted by the Drummondville Voltigeurs in the 1994 QMJHL Draft. Brière's number 14 was retired by this team, on January 21, 2007, during a ceremony in the Marcel Dionne Center of Drummondville.

In his rookie season, he recorded 123 points, third overall in the league, was awarded the Michel Bergeron Trophy as league rookie of the year, and the Marcel Robert Trophy as scholastic player of the year. The following season, he improved to 163 points, earning the Jean Béliveau Trophy as the league's leading scorer. He was also named the QMJHL Humanitarian of the Year and awarded the Ford Cup as offensive player of the year. Despite a remarkable six-game, 18-point postseason effort from Brière, Drummondville was not able to advance from the divisional round-robin.

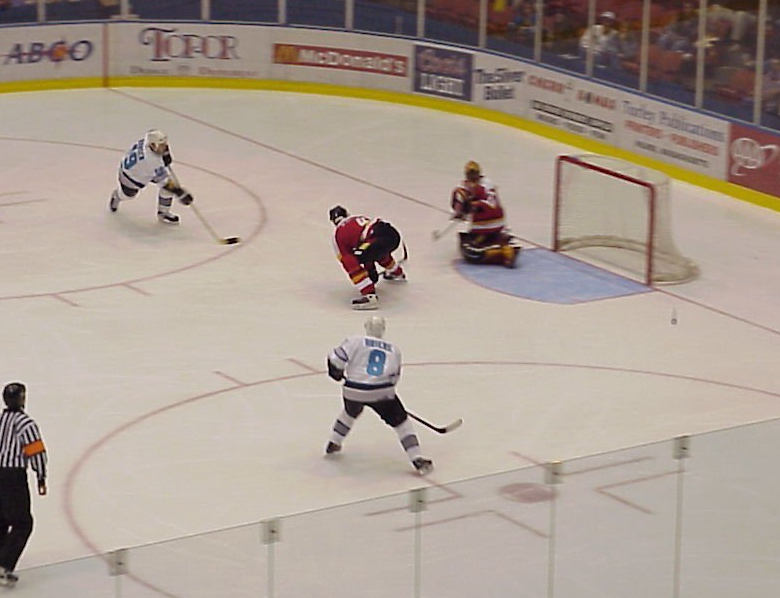
Brière (8) as a member of the Springfield Falcons in 2000.

After Brière was drafted by the Phoenix Coyotes in the first round, 24th overall, in the 1996 NHL entry draft, he returned to Drummondville for one more season. He recorded 130 points, finishing in the top three in league scoring for the third consecutive season, and was awarded the Frank J. Selke Memorial Trophy as the most sportsmanlike player.

=== Phoenix Coyotes and AHL ===
Graduating from major junior, Brière split his first four seasons in the NHL between the Coyotes and their American Hockey League (AHL) affiliate, the Springfield Falcons. In his first professional season in 1998, he recorded 92 points in 68 games and was awarded the Dudley "Red" Garrett Memorial Award as top rookie, as well as being named the AHL's First Team All-Star center. He is the third leading scorer in Falcons' franchise history.

Brière's training regimen became newsworthy in 2001 when it became known that, in order to overcome his diminutive size (at 5 ft. 9 in., he is comparatively small by NHL standards), he had begun off-season strength training with Canadian World's Strongest Man competitor Hugo Girard, who shares Gatineau as a hometown. He earned a consistent NHL roster spot in the second half of the 2000–01 season and spent his first full season with the Coyotes in 2001–02, recording 60 points.

=== Buffalo Sabres ===
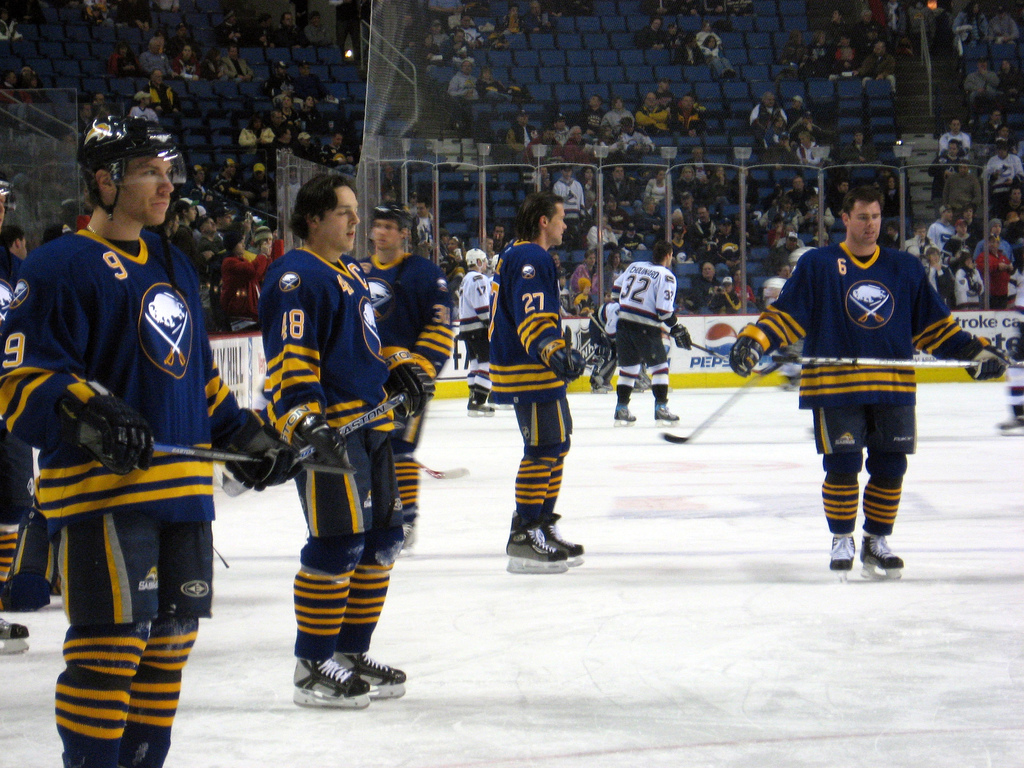
Brière (48) prior to a game between the Sabres and the Vancouver Canucks in January 2007.

At the 2002–03 trade deadline, the Coyotes traded Brière to the Buffalo Sabres alongside a third-round pick in the 2004 NHL entry draft in exchange for Chris Gratton and a fourth-round pick in 2004. After playing with SC Bern of the Swiss Nationaliiga A during the 2004–05 NHL lockout, he returned to Buffalo and emerged as a bona fide NHL star, beginning with a 58-point season in just 48 games during the 2005–06 campaign. Brière was kept out of the lineup for 32 games due to an abdominal injury suffered in January that required surgery and a two-game suspension following an inadvertent high-stick to Boston Bruins defenceman Brian Leetch. Completing the season with the Sabres healthy, Brière helped lead the club to their first postseason berth in five years. During this time he earned the nickname "Cookie Monster" from Sabres play by play announcer Rick Jeanneret for his notoriety for shooting top shelf, "where momma hides the cookies." Playing on a rejuvenated team that included stars Chris Drury, Thomas Vanek and Brian Campbell, the Sabres advanced to the conference-finals, paced by Brière's team-high 19 points. In the off-season, Brière filed for salary arbitration, which resulted in a one-year, $5 million contract that the Sabres agreed to on August 5, 2006.

The following season, Brière scored two hat tricks. His first came on December 5, 2006, against the Tampa Bay Lightning's goaltender Marc Denis. His second came shortly after, on January 30, 2007, in front of a home crowd at HSBC Arena in a 7–1 victory against the Boston Bruins, with two goals against Hannu Toivonen and one against his replacement Tim Thomas. He was voted in as a starter to his first NHL All-Star Game in Dallas, Texas, and recorded a game-high five points (one goal, four assists). He was named All-Star Game MVP and received a Dodge Nitro that he ended up giving to his sister. Brière finished the season with a career-high 32 goals, 63 assists and 95 points. He added 15 points in the postseason as the Sabres made their second straight appearance in the conference finals, but were eliminated by the Ottawa Senators.

=== Philadelphia Flyers ===
As Brière's one-year contract expired at the end of 2006–07, he became an unrestricted free agent on July 1, 2007. It was widely speculated that Brière would return to his home province and play for the Montreal Canadiens, but he instead signed with the Philadelphia Flyers, who finished the previous season as the worst team in the NHL, to an eight-year, $52 million contract with a no-trade clause. The Flyers front-loaded the deal, paying Brière $10 million in the first season of the contract, making him the highest paid player of the league in 2007–08, along with Scott Gomez of the New York Rangers and former Sabres teammate Thomas Vanek. His decision to join the Flyers is often attributed to the influence of his friend Martin Biron, who was traded from Buffalo to Philadelphia at the previous season's trade deadline. He later cited the prospect of anonymity in Philadelphia as opposed to Montreal as an additional factor in his decision.

Brière's production dipped in his first season with the Flyers in 2007–08, but he still finished second in team scoring with 72 points in 79 games, behind eventual team captain Mike Richards. He scored his third career hat trick near the beginning of the season on November 21, 2007, against the Carolina Hurricanes's goaltender Cam Ward. Led by Brière and Richards on the newly revamped Flyers (additional off-season acquisitions included Kimmo Timonen, Scott Hartnell and Joffrey Lupul), Philadelphia went from worst team in the NHL the previous season to an appearance in the 2008 conference-finals against eventual Eastern Conference champions, the Pittsburgh Penguins. Brière recorded nine goals and seven assists in his third straight semi-finals appearance.

Less than a month into the 2008–09 season, on October 22, Brière suffered another abdominal tear requiring surgery. He was expected to be sidelined at least a month, but returned within half that time on November 8 against the Tampa Bay Lightning. In the next game, however, against the New York Islanders on November 11, he suffered a groin pull, sidelining him for nine games. In his first game back, Brière suffered yet another setback; he re-injured his groin on December 3 against the Tampa Bay Lightning. Preparing to make a return to the Flyers lineup, he was assigned to the Philadelphia Phantoms of the AHL on January 13, 2009, to play three games on a conditioning basis. Brière finished the season having played in just 29 games for the Flyers, recording 11 goals and 14 assists. The Flyers were eliminated for the second consecutive year in the playoffs by the Pittsburgh Penguins, the eventual Stanley Cup champions. Brière scored one goal along with three assists in the series.

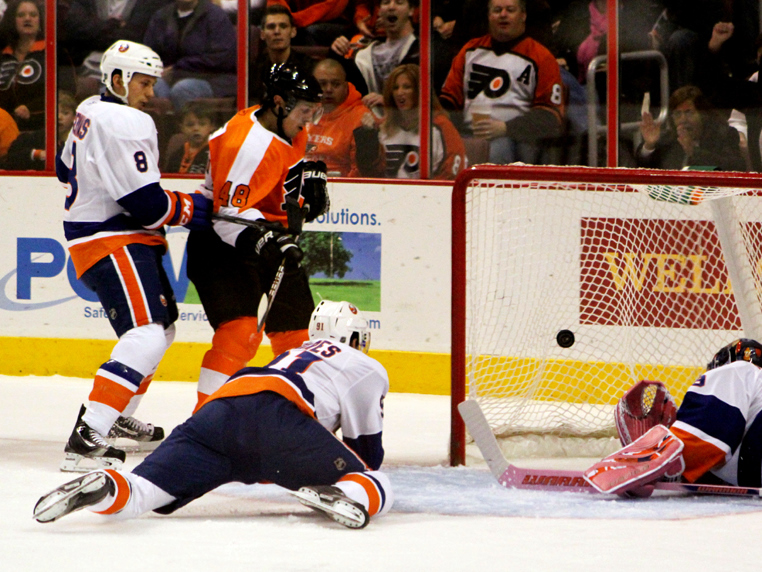
Daniel Brière (centre) watches a goal go in against the New York Islanders in October 2010.

The following season, Brière was suspended by the NHL for two games for leaving his feet to check Colorado Avalanche defenceman Scott Hannan, making contact with Hannan's neck with his elbow during a game on November 23, 2009. He also suffered a tweaked groin during that season and missed five games because of it. However, a highlight came to Brière on February 13, 2010, in a game in Montreal where he scored a hat trick with all goals in different situations: power-play, even strength and penalty shot against Carey Price.

Brière led the entire 2010 Stanley Cup playoffs in scoring with 30 points (12 goals and 18 assists) and in the process broke the record for points in a postseason by a Flyer, held previously by Brian Propp, who had 28 in 1987. Five games into the playoffs, he was placed with wingers Scott Hartnell and Ville Leino, where the line went on to be one of the most effective of the postseason. In the 2010 Stanley Cup Final series alone, Brière finished with 12 points (three goals and nine assists), one point shy of Wayne Gretzky's record of 13 in a final, and the highest output in a final since Mario Lemieux in 1992.

During the last minute of an October 30, 2010, game against the New York Islanders, Brière was given a five-minute cross-checking major and a game misconduct for a stick-swinging incident with Frans Nielsen. On November 1, the NHL suspended Brière for three games. Brière disagreed with the ruling, saying, "If you look at the replay, it's clearly not a crosscheck which is two hands moving forward. It's a push with one hand. The mistake I made is my stick was up there. Is it worth three games for that? I don't think so. And on top of that, I missed him. I didn't even get him... My glove grazed the top of his helmet, not my stick."

On January 19, 2011, Brière was named as the replacement to play in the All-Star Game for Calgary Flames player Jarome Iginla, who cited health concerns about his grandmother as the reason for dropping out of what would have been his sixth All-Star appearance. Brière scored two goals for Team Lidstrom in the game, helping them to an 11–10 victory over Team Staal. Brière finished the 2010–11 NHL season with 34 goals and 34 assists. He went on to record seven goals during the 2011 Stanley Cup playoffs, a postseason that saw the Flyers defeat Brière's former team, the Buffalo Sabres, in seven games but fall to the eventual Stanley Cup champion Boston Bruins in a four-game sweep.

On January 7, 2012, Brière scored his fifth hat trick as well as his third NHL fight (against Kyle Turris) on home ice. His third goal, against Craig Anderson, was the game winner in overtime as the Flyers beat the Ottawa Senators by a 3–2 score, Brière having scored all of the Flyers' goals. During the 2012 Stanley Cup playoffs, Brière continued his dominant playoff play, scoring eight goals in 11 games as the Flyers eventually fell to the New Jersey Devils, the eventual Eastern Conference Champions, in five games in the second round.

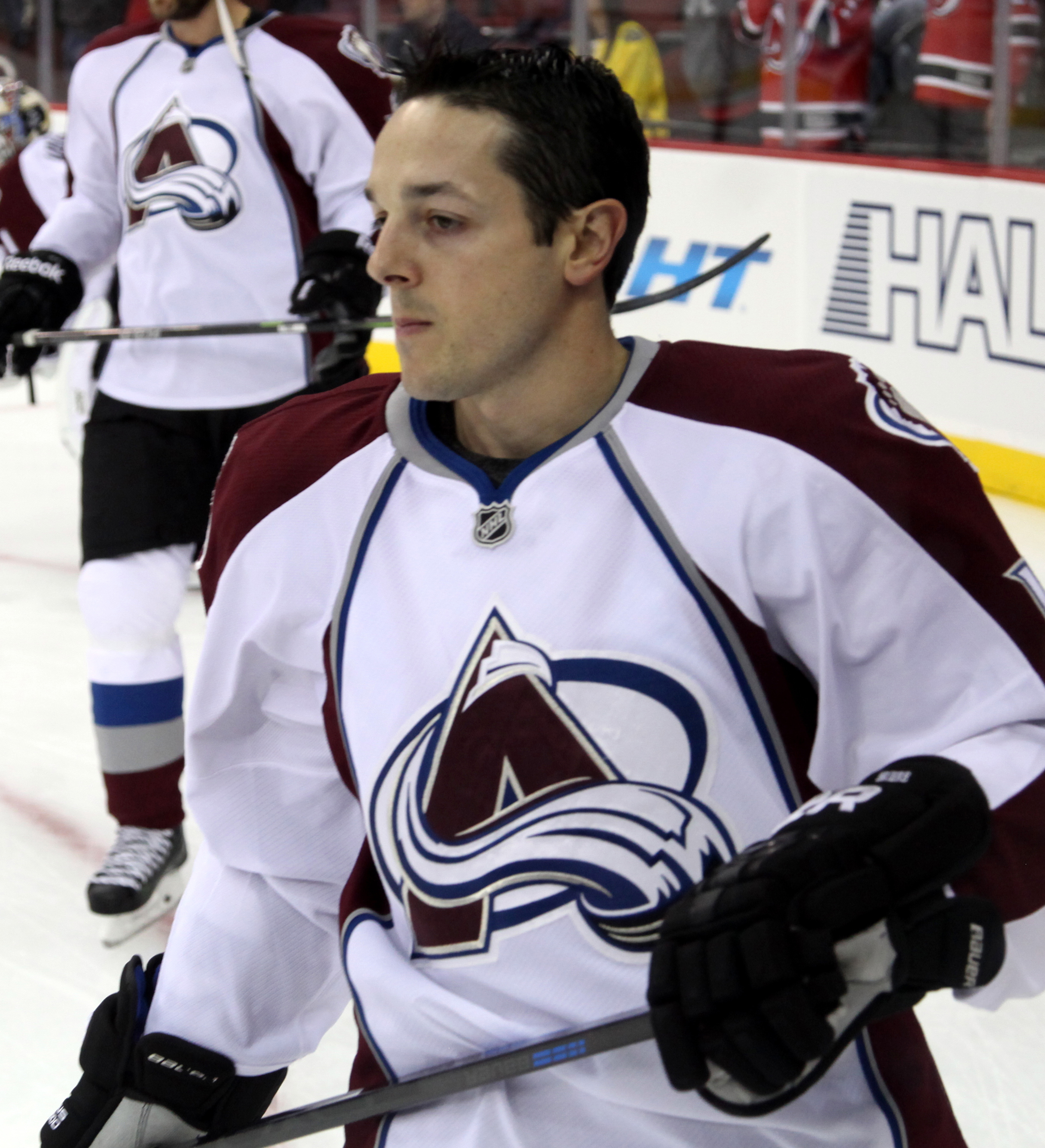
Brière warming-up with the Avalanche in November 2014

During the 2012–13 NHL lockout, Brière and Flyers teammate Claude Giroux played for Eisbären Berlin of the German Deutsche Eishockey Liga (DEL). Brière played in a total of 21 games before being injured by an uncalled slash of his wrist which resulted in hyperextension and a bone bruise.

On June 18, 2013, Brière was informed by Flyers management that he would be given a compliance buyout, ending his tenure with the Flyers.

=== Montreal Canadiens ===
On July 4, 2013, Brière signed a two-year, $8 million contract with the Montreal Canadiens. Brière became the first player in NHL history to have an accent grave on his jersey. On October 19, 2013, Brière sustained another concussion against the Nashville Predators after a collision with Eric Nystrom, which sidelined him for almost a month before returning to the lineup on November 12, 2013. Brière returned to the Wells Fargo Center in Philadelphia on December 12, 2013, and was greeted with a standing ovation by the home crowd.

=== Colorado Avalanche ===
On June 30, 2014, Brière was traded to the Colorado Avalanche in exchange for P. A. Parenteau and a fifth-round draft pick in 2015.

Following the conclusion of the 2014–15 season, Brière was not re-signed by the club, and on August 17, 2015, he announced his official retirement from professional hockey.

== Management career ==
After his retirement, Brière remained involved in the Flyers organization. In June 2017, it was announced that he had been appointed to run the day-to-day operations of the upcoming Maine Mariners that had been purchased by the Flyers' owners Comcast Spectacor and moved to Portland, Maine, to begin play in 2018–19. Partway through the 2021–22 season, Brière was named the special assistant to the general manager for the Flyers. On March 10, 2023, the Flyers named Brière interim general manager, later promoting him to permanent general manager on May 11.

== International play ==
Medal record

Representing Canada

Ice hockey

World Championships
Gold medal – first place	2004 Czech Republic	
Gold medal – first place	2003 Finland	

World Junior Championships
Gold medal – first place	1997 Switzerland	

Brière appeared in the 1994 Ivan Hlinka Memorial Tournament, a highly competitive under-18 event not directly sanctioned by the International Ice Hockey Federation (IIHF). He scored five points and earned his first gold medal as Canada defeated the United States 5–2 in the final. Three years later, during his final year of major junior in the Quebec Major Junior Hockey League (QMJHL), he competed for Canada junior team at the 1997 World Junior Championships in Switzerland. Brière scored six points in seven games and captured his second gold medal, defeating the United States once more 2–0.

Brière debuted with Canada senior team at the 2003 World Championships and scored nine points in nine games. He earned another gold medal, defeating Sweden in the final. The next year, at the 2004 World Championships, Brière earned his fourth gold medal in as many international appearances, again topping Sweden 5–3 in the final. He tallied eight points to finish ninth in tournament scoring.

== Personal life ==
Brière attended Collège Saint-Alexandre, a private high school in Gatineau. He has four sons: Caelan (born July 1998), Carson (born September 1999), and Cameron (born April 2001) with his ex-wife Sylvie, and Caiden (born March 2022) with his current wife Misha. He currently resides in Philadelphia.

Brière had fellow Flyer Claude Giroux as a housemate in 2011; when Giroux moved out after the 2010–11 season, Flyers rookie and fellow French–Canadian Sean Couturier moved in.

Brière's son Carson was removed from the Arizona State Sun Devils men's ice hockey team in 2019 during his freshman year for violating team code of conduct. Leaked documentation later revealed that the code of conduct violation was assault. On March 11, 2023, while a junior at Mercyhurst University, Carson was recorded on security camera footage at a club damaging another patron's unoccupied wheelchair by pushing it down a flight of stairs. Multiple criminal charges were later announced. Carson was again removed from his university's hockey team and sentenced to 15 months of probation in December 2023.

== Career statistics ==
=== Regular season and playoffs ===
			Regular season					Playoffs
Season	Team	League	GP	G	A	Pts	PIM	GP	G	A	Pts	PIM
1992–93	Abitibi-Témiscamingue Forestiers	QMAAA	42	24	30	54	28	3	0	3	3	8
1993–94	Gatineau L'Intrépide	QMAAA	44	56	47	103	56	12	13	19	32	8
1994–95	Drummondville Voltigeurs	QMJHL	72	51	72	123	54	4	2	3	5	2
1995–96	Drummondville Voltigeurs	QMJHL	67	67	96	163	84	6	6	12	18	8
1996–97	Drummondville Voltigeurs	QMJHL	59	52	78	130	86	8	7	7	14	14
1997–98	Springfield Falcons	AHL	68	36	56	92	42	4	1	2	3	4
1997–98	Phoenix Coyotes	NHL	5	1	0	1	2	—	—	—	—	—
1998–99	Phoenix Coyotes	NHL	64	8	14	22	30	—	—	—	—	—
1998–99	Springfield Falcons	AHL	13	2	6	8	20	3	0	1	1	2
1998–99	Las Vegas Thunder	IHL	1	1	1	2	0	—	—	—	—	—
1999–00	Springfield Falcons	AHL	58	29	42	71	56	—	—	—	—	—
1999–00	Phoenix Coyotes	NHL	13	1	1	2	0	1	0	0	0	0
2000–01	Springfield Falcons	AHL	30	21	25	46	30	—	—	—	—	—
2000–01	Phoenix Coyotes	NHL	30	11	4	15	12	—	—	—	—	—
2001–02	Phoenix Coyotes	NHL	78	32	28	60	52	5	2	1	3	2
2002–03	Phoenix Coyotes	NHL	68	17	29	46	50	—	—	—	—	—
2002–03	Buffalo Sabres	NHL	14	7	5	12	12	—	—	—	—	—
2003–04	Buffalo Sabres	NHL	82	28	37	65	70	—	—	—	—	—
2004–05	SC Bern	NLA	36	17	29	46	26	11	1	6	7	2
2005–06	Buffalo Sabres	NHL	48	25	33	58	48	18	8	11	19	12
2006–07	Buffalo Sabres	NHL	81	32	63	95	89	16	3	12	15	16
2007–08	Philadelphia Flyers	NHL	79	31	41	72	68	17	9	7	16	20
2008–09	Philadelphia Flyers	NHL	29	11	14	25	26	6	1	3	4	8
2008–09	Philadelphia Phantoms	AHL	3	1	4	5	2	—	—	—	—	—
2009–10	Philadelphia Flyers	NHL	75	26	27	53	71	23	12	18	30	18
2010–11	Philadelphia Flyers	NHL	77	34	34	68	87	11	7	2	9	14
2011–12	Philadelphia Flyers	NHL	70	16	33	49	69	11	8	5	13	4
2012–13	Eisbären Berlin	DEL	21	10	24	34	24	—	—	—	—	—
2012–13	Philadelphia Flyers	NHL	34	6	10	16	10	—	—	—	—	—
2013–14	Montreal Canadiens	NHL	69	13	12	25	30	16	3	4	7	4
2014–15	Colorado Avalanche	NHL	57	8	4	12	18	—	—	—	—	—
NHL totals			973	307	389	696	744	124	53	63	116	98

=== International ===
Year	Team	Event	Results	GP	G	A	Pts	PIM
1994	Canada	U18	1st place, gold medalist(s)	5	2	3	5	4
1997	Canada	WJC	1st place, gold medalist(s)	7	2	4	6	2
2003	Canada	WC	1st place, gold medalist(s)	9	4	5	9	6
2004	Canada	WC	1st place, gold medalist(s)	9	2	6	8	6
Junior totals				12	4	7	11	6
Senior totals				18	6	11	17	12

== Awards and achievements ==
=== Minor ===
- Named Top Forward at the 1994 Air Canada Cup

=== QMJHL ===
- Michel Bergeron Trophy – 1995
- Marcel Robert Trophy – 1995
- QMJHL All-Rookie Team – 1995
- Jean Béliveau Trophy – 1996
- QMJHL Humanitarian of the Year – 1996
- Ford Cup – 1996
- QMJHL Second All-Star Team – 1996, 1997
- Frank J. Selke Memorial Trophy – 1997

=== AHL ===
- Rookie of the Month – October 1997
- Dudley "Red" Garrett Memorial Award – 1998

=== NHL ===
- Played in the All-Star Game in 2007 (starter) and 2011
- Named the All-Star Game MVP in 2007
- Led all players in points during the 2010 Stanley Cup playoffs – 30
- Played in the All-Star Game in 2011

Awards and achievements
Preceded by Dan Focht	Phoenix Coyotes first-round draft pick 1996	Succeeded by Patrick DesRochers
Preceded by Jean-Pierre Dumont	Buffalo Sabres captain February 2004	Succeeded by Chris Drury
Preceded by Chris Drury rotating captaincy ended	Buffalo Sabres captain 2005–2007; With: Chris Drury	Succeeded by Jochen Hecht rotating captaincy resumed
Preceded by Chuck Fletcher	General manager of the Philadelphia Flyers; 2023–present	Incumbent
