= 2008–09 St. Louis Blues season =

National Hockey League team season

2008–09 St. Louis Blues
- Division: 3rd Central
- Conference: 6th Western
- 2008–09 record: 41–31–10
- Home record: 23–13–5
- Road record: 18–18–5
- Goals for: 233
- Goals against: 233

Team information
- General manager: Larry Pleau
- Coach: Andy Murray
- Captain: Eric Brewer
- Alternate captains: Barret Jackman; Paul Kariya; Keith Tkachuk
- Arena: Scottrade Center
- Average attendance: 18,554 (96.9%) [41 games; 760,732] (19,150 max.)

Team leaders
- Goals: Brad Boyes (33)
- Assists: Brad Boyes (39)
- Points: Brad Boyes (72)
- Penalty minutes: David Backes (165)
- Plus/minus: Patrik Berglund (+19)
- Wins: Chris Mason (27)
- Goals against average: Chris Mason (2.41)

The 2008–09 St. Louis Blues season, the 42nd season for the NHL franchise in St. Louis, Missouri, resulted in the team returning to the NHL Playoffs for the first time since 2004.

== Pre-season ==
=== Schedule and results ===
2008 Pre-season Game Log: 4–2–1 (Home: 3–0–0; Road: 1–2–1)
| # | Date | Visitor | Score | Home | OT | Decision | Attendance | Record | Recap |
| 1 | September 22 | St Louis | 1–2 | Los Angeles | | Mason | 11,603 | 0–1–0 |
| 2 | September 23 | Dallas | 2–3 | St Louis | | Legace | 10,796 | 1–1–0 |
| 3 | September 26 | Atlanta | 4–9 | St Louis | | Legace | 12,526 | 2–1–0 |
| 4 | September 27 | St Louis | 3–4 | Dallas | | Mason | 17,191 | 2–2–0 |
| 5 | September 29 | St Louis | 3–4 | Toronto | SO | Legace | 18,581 | 2–2–1 |
| 6 | October 1 | Toronto | 3–7 | St Louis | | Mason | 12,636 | 3–2–1 |
| 7 | October 4 | St Louis | 4–1 | Atlanta | | Legace | 7,648 | 4–2–1 |

== Regular season ==
=== Summary ===
Before the regular season, started the Blues were hit hard with an injury to defenseman Erik Johnson. Johnson suffered a leg injury in a golfing accident that put him out for the season. Despite this the Blues had a good start to the regular season, winning their first opening day game in years, and going 5–3–0, before injuries to Manny Legace and Andy McDonald, coupled with poor defensive play, placed the team in last place in their division at 5–8–1. The Blues would win three games in a row to make their record 9–8–1. On November 24, 2008, Blues President John Davidson announced the Blues had traded Lee Stempniak to the Toronto Maple Leafs for defenseman Carlo Colaiacovo and center Alexander Steen. On November 30, Keith Tkachuk became the sixth American-born hockey player, and 72nd overall, to score 1,000 points in a career. The point came on a goal scored in his 1,077th game. He now has 511 goals and 489 assists. The goal helped the Blues to a 4–2 victory over the Atlanta Thrashers. It was his 362nd point in a Blues' uniform, ranking him eighth all-time. The Blues would lose their next three games before winning 4–3 over the Phoenix Coyotes. St. Louis would then lose three straight games against teams on the West Coast. The Blues would follow up by losing their next two games to extend their losing streak to five. In that period, defenseman Jay McKee would become another victim of unfortunate injuries for the Blues. The Blues ended the month of December with a poor 4–10–1 record. Just before the All-Star Game break (January 22 to 28), the team gained seven points in their last four games. On February 6, two days after his 36th birthday, goaltender Manny Legace was placed on waivers, and the Blues recalled Chris Holt.

Andy McDonald returned to active status on February 10 after almost three months out with a broken left leg (since November 16) and promptly made his presence felt with an assist on the Blues' first goal, and then later added a goal of his own, against the Vancouver Canucks, although they ultimately lost the game.

A 6–2–4 surge in February pushed the Blues (60 points on Feb. 24) to an even 26–26 (eight overtime loses) record, and to within five points of the eighth and final playoff spot.

In a dramatic and wild 3–1 win, with the final two goals from the youngsters T. J. Oshie and Patrik Berglund late in the wide-open third period, plus 41 saves from Chris Mason, against the Dallas Stars on February 26, pushed the Blues into 12th place in the Western Conference, only three points from a playoff spot and over .500 for the first time since December 8.

A crucial 6–1 run from March 20 to April 2 pushed the Blues into eighth place, capped off by a stunning 5–4 win on April 2 over the Detroit Red Wings, their first victory over Detroit all season. The game was highlighted by David Backes' career-high four-goal night. It was the first four-goal night by any Blues' player since Scott Mellanby did it on March 6, 2003.

A key player in the team's late-season surge was the play of fan favorite T. J. Oshie, who was named NHL Rookie of the Month for March (April 2) after earning 13 points (four goals and nine assists) in 14 games, with the Blues going 9–4–1 in the month. From January 1 through the game on March 29, Oshie scored 11 goals and recorded 20 assists for 31 points in 37 games, leading all rookies, save for Bobby Ryan of the Anaheim Ducks, in that span. His play garnered praise from several Blues veterans, including goaltender Chris Mason: "T. J. is such a tenacious player. In every game he seems to create scoring chances out of nothing." Oshie was also listed #8 on "Hockey's Future Top 50 prospects."

The Blues clinched a playoff spot in their second-to-last game of the season (#81), and their last home game, on April 10, in front of a raucous, standing-room-only crowd of 19,250, beating the Columbus Blue Jackets 3–1 in their 40th win of the season. The defense was superb, giving up only 17 shots, their lowest of the season. This is the first season since 2003–04 the Blues have made the playoffs. In the 2005–06 season, the Blues were in last place overall, and in 2007–08, they were tied for the fourth-worst record in the NHL. The Blues completed one of the greatest late-season playoff surges in NHL history.

On the same day the Blues clinched a playoff spot, their first-round draft pick in 2008, Alex Pietrangelo, 19, was assigned from the Niagara IceDogs in the Ontario Hockey League (OHL) to the Blues' top minor-league affiliate, the Peoria Rivermen of the American Hockey League (AHL).

=== Divisional standings ===
Standings

Central Division
| | | GP | W | L | OTL | GF | GA | Pts |
|---|---|---|---|---|---|---|---|---|
| **1** | **y – Detroit Red Wings** | **82** | **51** | **21** | **10** | **295** | **244** | **112** |
| **2** | **Chicago Blackhawks** | **82** | **46** | **24** | **12** | **264** | **216** | **104** |
| **3** | **St. Louis Blues** | **82** | **41** | **31** | **10** | **233** | **233** | **92** |
| **4** | **Columbus Blue Jackets** | **82** | **41** | **31** | **10** | **226** | **230** | **92** |
| 5 | Nashville Predators | 82 | 40 | 34 | 8 | 213 | 233 | 88 |

=== Conference standings ===
Standings

Western Conference
| R | | Div | GP | W | L | OTL | GF | GA | Pts |
|---|---|---|---|---|---|---|---|---|---|
| **1** | **p – San Jose Sharks** | **PA** | **82** | **53** | **18** | **11** | **257** | **204** | 117 |
| **2** | **y – Detroit Red Wings** | **CE** | **82** | **51** | **21** | **10** | **295** | **244** | 112 |
| **3** | **y – Vancouver Canucks** | **NW** | **82** | **45** | **27** | **10** | **246** | **220** | 100 |
| **4** | **Chicago Blackhawks** | **CE** | **82** | **46** | **24** | **12** | **264** | **216** | 104 |
| **5** | **Calgary Flames** | **NW** | **82** | **46** | **30** | **6** | **254** | **248** | 98 |
| **6** | **St. Louis Blues** | **CE** | **82** | **41** | **31** | **10** | **233** | **233** | 92 |
| **7** | **Columbus Blue Jackets** | **CE** | **82** | **41** | **31** | **10** | **226** | **230** | 92 |
| **8** | **Anaheim Ducks** | **PA** | **82** | **42** | **33** | **7** | **245** | **238** | 91 |
8.5
| 9 | Minnesota Wild | NW | 82 | 40 | 33 | 9 | 219 | 200 | 89 |
| 10 | Nashville Predators | CE | 82 | 40 | 34 | 8 | 213 | 233 | 88 |
| 11 | Edmonton Oilers | NW | 82 | 38 | 35 | 9 | 234 | 248 | 85 |
| 12 | Dallas Stars | PA | 82 | 36 | 35 | 11 | 230 | 257 | 83 |
| 13 | Phoenix Coyotes | PA | 82 | 36 | 39 | 7 | 208 | 252 | 79 |
| 14 | Los Angeles Kings | PA | 82 | 34 | 37 | 11 | 207 | 234 | 79 |
| 15 | Colorado Avalanche | NW | 82 | 32 | 45 | 5 | 199 | 257 | 69 |

bold – qualified for playoffs, y – division winner, p – Presidents' Trophy winner
CE – Central Division, NW – Northwest Division, PA – Pacific Division

== Schedule and results ==
- Green background indicates win (2 points).
- Red background indicates regulation loss (0 points).
- White background indicates overtime/shootout loss (1 point).

2008–09 Game Log

October: 5–4–0 (Home: 4–3–0; Road: 1–1–0)
| # | Date | Visitor | Score | Home | OT | Goaltender | Attendance | Record | Pts | Recap |
| 1 | October 10 | Nashville | 2–5 | St Louis | | Legace | 19,150 | 1–0–0 | 2 |
| 2 | October 11 | St Louis | 2–5 | NY Islanders | | Mason | 16,234 | 1–1–0 | 2 |
| 3 | October 13 | St Louis | 5–4 | Toronto | SO | Legace | 19,045 | 2–1–0 | 4 |
| 4 | October 16 | Dallas | 1–6 | St Louis | | Legace | 18,550 | 3–1–0 | 6 |
| 5 | October 18 | Chicago | 3–4 | St Louis | SO | Legace | 19,150 | 4–1–0 | 8 |
| 6 | October 22 | Detroit | 4–3 | St Louis | | Legace | 19,150 | 4–2–0 | 8 |
| 7 | October 24 | Los Angeles | 4–0 | St Louis | | Legace | 19,150 | 4–3–0 | 8 |
| 8 | October 25 | Florida | 0–4 | St Louis | | Bishop | 19,150 | 5–3–0 | 10 |
| 9 | October 30 | Carolina | 1–0 | St Louis | | Mason | 17,860 | 5–4–0 | 10 |

November: 5–6–2 (Home: 1–2–1; Road: 4–4–1)
| # | Date | Visitor | Score | Home | OT | Goaltender | Attendance | Record | Pts | Recap |
| 10 | November 1 | Pittsburgh | 6–3 | St Louis | | Mason | 19,150 | 5–5–0 | 10 |
| 11 | November 5 | St Louis | 2–5 | Anaheim | | Mason | 16,144 | 5–6–0 | 10 |
| 12 | November 6 | St Louis | 4–5 | San Jose | SO | Bishop | 17,496 | 5–6–1 | 11 |
| 13 | November 8 | St Louis | 3–5 | Los Angeles | | Legace | 17,182 | 5–7–1 | 11 |
| 14 | November 12 | St Louis | 3–4 | Buffalo | | Mason | 18,690 | 5–8–1 | 11 |
| 15 | November 14 | St Louis | 4–3 | Chicago | OT | Legace | 22,260 | 6–8–1 | 13 |
| 16 | November 16 | Montreal | 3–2 | St Louis | SO | Legace | 19,150 | 6–8–2 | 14 |
| 17 | November 21 | Anaheim | 2–3 | St Louis | OT | Legace | 19,150 | 7–8–2 | 16 |
| 18 | November 22 | St Louis | 2–1 | Minnesota | | Mason | 18,568 | 8–8–2 | 18 |
| 19 | November 25 | St Louis | 1–0 | Nashville | SO | Mason | 13,825 | 9–8–2 | 20 |
| 20 | November 26 | St Louis | 1–3 | Colorado | | Legace | 14,568 | 9–9–2 | 20 |
| 21 | November 29 | Edmonton | 4–2 | St Louis | | Legace | 19,150 | 9–10–2 | 20 |
| 22 | November 30 | St Louis | 4–2 | Atlanta | | Mason | 14,078 | 10–10–2 | 22 |

December: 4–10–1 (Home: 4–4–1; Road: 0–6–0)
| # | Date | Visitor | Score | Home | OT | Goaltender | Attendance | Record | Pts | Recap |
| 23 | December 3 | St Louis | 0–4 | Minnesota | | Mason | 18,568 | 10–11–2 | 22 |
| 24 | December 5 | Calgary | 4–3 | St Louis | OT | Mason | 17,365 | 10–11–3 | 23 |
| 25 | December 6 | Phoenix | 3–4 | St Louis | | Legace | 19,150 | 11–11–3 | 25 |
| 26 | December 8 | Nashville | 3–6 | St Louis | | Legace | 14,537 | 12–11–3 | 27 |
| 27 | December 10 | St Louis | 2–4 | Anaheim | | Mason | 16,058 | 12–12–3 | 27 |
| 28 | December 11 | St Louis | 2–6 | Los Angeles | | Mason | 13,851 | 12–13–3 | 27 |
| 29 | December 13 | St Louis | 4–5 | San Jose | | Mason | 17,496 | 12–14–3 | 27 |
| 30 | December 16 | Calgary | 6–3 | St Louis | | Mason | 16,426 | 12–15–3 | 27 |
| 31 | December 18 | St Louis | 2–4 | Washington | | Bishop | 18,277 | 12–16–3 | 27 |
| 32 | December 20 | Minnesota | 2–4 | St Louis | | Legace | 19,150 | 13–16–3 | 29 |
| 33 | December 21 | Boston | 6–3 | St Louis | | Legace | 19,150 | 13–17–3 | 29 |
| 34 | December 23 | St Louis | 1–4 | Detroit | | Legace | 20,066 | 13–18–3 | 29 |
| 35 | December 27 | San Jose | 2–3 | St Louis | SO | Legace | 19,150 | 14–18–3 | 31 |
| 36 | December 28 | Anaheim | 4–3 | St Louis | | Mason | 19,150 | 14–19–3 | 31 |
| 37 | December 30 | New Jersey | 4–3 | St Louis | | Legace | 19,150 | 14–20–3 | 31 |

January: 6–4–1 (Home: 3–1–1; Road: 3–3–0)
| # | Date | Visitor | Score | Home | OT | Goaltender | Attendance | Record | Pts | Recap |
| 38 | January 2 | St Louis | 1–2 | Carolina | | Mason | 17,092 | 14–21–3 | 31 |
| 39 | January 3 | Columbus | 2–5 | St Louis | | Legace | 19,150 | 15–21–3 | 33 |
| 40 | January 9 | St Louis | 6–4 | Vancouver | | Legace | 18,630 | 16–21–3 | 35 |
| 41 | January 11 | St Louis | 1–2 | Edmonton | | Legace | 16,839 | 16–22–3 | 35 |
| 42 | January 13 | St Louis | 1–3 | Calgary | | Mason | 19,289 | 16–23–3 | 35 |
| 43 | January 15 | Colorado | 2–5 | St Louis | | Legace | 17,545 | 17–23–3 | 37 |
| 44 | January 17 | Chicago | 2–1 | St Louis | OT | Legace | 19,250 | 17–23–4 | 38 |
| 45 | January 19 | St Louis | 5–4 | Boston | SO | Mason | 17,565 | 18–23–4 | 40 |
| 46 | January 21 | St Louis | 2–0 | Chicago | | Mason | 22,299 | 19–23–4 | 42 |
| 47 | January 29 | Ottawa | 3–1 | St Louis | | Mason | 18,639 | 19–24–4 | 42 |
| 48 | January 31 | Philadelphia | 0–4 | St Louis | | Mason | 19,150 | 20–24–4 | 44 |

February: 8–2–4 (Home: 4–1–2; Road: 4–1–2)
| # | Date | Visitor | Score | Home | OT | Goaltender | Attendance | Record | Pts | Recap |
| 49 | February 2 | St Louis | 3–4 | Detroit | SO | Mason | 19,384 | 20–24–5 | 45 |
| 50 | February 3 | St Louis | 4–2 | Columbus | | Mason | 13,560 | 21–24–5 | 47 |
| 51 | February 5 | Edmonton | 2–1 | St Louis | SO | Mason | 15,668 | 21–24–6 | 48 |
| 52 | February 7 | Colorado | 1–4 | St Louis | | Mason | 19,250 | 22–24–6 | 50 |
| 53 | February 10 | Vancouver | 6–4 | St Louis | | Mason | 16,431 | 22–25–6 | 50 |
| 54 | February 12 | St Louis | 3–4 | Nashville | SO | Mason | 14,307 | 22–25–7 | 51 |
| 55 | February 13 | Chicago | 0–1 | St Louis | | Mason | 19,150 | 23–25–7 | 53 |
| 56 | February 16 | NY Rangers | 1–2 | St Louis | | Mason | 16,341 | 24–25–7 | 55 |
| 57 | February 18 | St Louis | 3–4 | Columbus | | Mason | 14,305 | 24–26–7 | 55 |
| 58 | February 19 | St Louis | 2–1 | Nashville | OT | Mason | 15,037 | 25–26–7 | 57 |
| 59 | February 21 | Nashville | 1–0 | St Louis | OT | Mason | 19,250 | 25–26–8 | 58 |
| 60 | February 24 | Phoenix | 1–2 | St Louis | | Mason | 17,512 | 26–26–8 | 60 |
| 61 | February 26 | St Louis | 3–1 | Dallas | | Mason | 17,603 | 27–26–8 | 62 |
| 62 | February 28 | St Louis | 3–1 | Phoenix | | Mason | 15,893 | 28–26–8 | 64 |

March: 9–4–1 (Home: 6–2–0; Road: 3–2–1)
| # | Date | Visitor | Score | Home | OT | Goaltender | Attendance | Record | Pts | Recap |
| 63 | March 3 | Detroit | 5–0 | St Louis | | Mason | 19,250 | 28–27–8 | 64 |
| 64 | March 6 | St Louis | 4–3 | Tampa Bay | OT | Mason | 13,831 | 29–27–8 | 66 |
| 65 | March 7 | St Louis | 3–5 | Florida | | Mason | 17,591 | 29–28–8 | 66 |
| 66 | March 10 | Dallas | 2–5 | St Louis | | Mason | 17,708 | 30–28–8 | 68 |
| 67 | March 12 | San Jose | 1–3 | St Louis | | Mason | 19,150 | 31–28–8 | 70 |
| 68 | March 14 | Detroit | 5–2 | St Louis | | Mason | 19,250 | 31–29–8 | 70 |
| 69 | March 15 | Minnesota | 3–5 | St Louis | | Mason | 19,150 | 32–29–8 | 72 |
| 70 | March 17 | St Louis | 1–2 | Edmonton | SO | Mason | 16,839 | 32–29–9 | 73 |
| 71 | March 19 | St Louis | 0–3 | Vancouver | | Mason | 18,630 | 32–30–9 | 73 |
| 72 | March 20 | St Louis | 3–2 | Calgary | | Mason | 19,289 | 33–30–9 | 75 |
| 73 | March 24 | Los Angeles | 0–2 | St Louis | | Mason | 19,150 | 34–30–9 | 77 |
| 74 | March 26 | Vancouver | 2–4 | St Louis | | Mason | 19,250 | 35–30–9 | 79 |
| 75 | March 28 | Columbus | 3–4 | St Louis | SO | Mason | 19,250 | 36–30–9 | 81 |
| 76 | March 29 | St Louis | 5–2 | Columbus | | Mason | 17,095 | 37–30–9 | 83 |

April: 4–1–1 (Home: 1–0–0; Road: 2–1–1)
| # | Date | Visitor | Score | Home | OT | Goaltender | Attendance | Record | Pts | Recap |
| 77 | April 1 | St Louis | 1–3 | Chicago | | Mason | 21,548 | 37–31–9 | 83 |
| 78 | April 2 | St Louis | 5–4 | Detroit | | Mason | 19,935 | 38–31–9 | 85 |
| 79 | April 4 | St Louis | 4–5 | Dallas | OT | Mason | 18,532 | 38–31–10 | 86 |
| 80 | April 7 | St Louis | 5–1 | Phoenix | | Mason | 13,761 | 39–31–10 | 88 |
| 81 | April 10 | Columbus | 1–3 | St Louis | | Mason | 19,250 | 40–31–10 | 90 |
| 82 | April 12 | St Louis | 1–0 | Colorado | | Mason | 13,661 | 41–31–10 | 92 |

== Playoffs ==
The St. Louis Blues returned to the NHL Playoffs for the first time since 2004 with a sixth-place finish in the Western Conference. They were swept in four straight games in the first round by the Vancouver Canucks in large part due to the goaltending of Roberto Luongo. It was the first time the Blues were swept in a playoff series since the Dallas Stars did it to them in 1994

2009 Stanley Cup playoffs

Western Conference quarter-final vs. (3) Vancouver Canucks: Vancouver won 4–0
| # | Date | Visitor | Score | Home | OT | Goaltender | Attendance | Series | Recap |
|---|---|---|---|---|---|---|---|---|---|
| 1 | April 15 | St. Louis | 1 – 2 | Vancouver | | Mason | 18,630 | 0–1 |
| 2 | April 17 | St. Louis | 0 – 3 | Vancouver | | Mason | 18,630 | 0–2 |
| 3 | April 19 | Vancouver | 3 - 2 | St. Louis | | Mason | 19,500 | 0-3 |
| 4 | April 21 | Vancouver | 3 - 2 | St. Louis | OT (19:41) | Mason | 19,250 | 0-4 |

Legend: Win Loss

== Player statistics ==
=== Skaters ===
Note: Pos = Position; GP = Games played; G = Goals; A = Assists; Pts = Points; PIM = Penalty minutes; +/- = Plus/minus; PPG = Power-play goals; SHG = Short-handed goals; GWG = Game-winning goals

Regular season

| Player | GP | G | A | Pts | +/− | PIM |
|---|---|---|---|---|---|---|
| Brad Boyes | 82 | 33 | 39 | 72 | -20 | 26 |
| David Backes | 82 | 31 | 23 | 54 | -3 | 165 |
| David Perron | 81 | 15 | 35 | 50 | +13 | 50 |
| Keith Tkachuk | 79 | 25 | 24 | 49 | -11 | 61 |
| Patrik Berglund | 76 | 21 | 26 | 47 | +19 | 16 |
| Andy McDonald | 46 | 15 | 29 | 44 | -13 | 24 |
| T. J. Oshie | 57 | 14 | 25 | 39 | +16 | 30 |
| Carlo Colaiacovo^{†} | 63 | 3 | 26 | 29 | +2 | 29 |
| Jay McClement | 82 | 12 | 14 | 26 | -10 | 29 |
| Alexander Steen^{†} | 61 | 6 | 18 | 24 | -6 | 24 |
| Barret Jackman | 82 | 4 | 17 | 21 | -17 | 86 |
| Brad Winchester | 64 | 13 | 8 | 21 | -1 | 89 |
| Jeff Woywitka | 65 | 3 | 15 | 18 | +8 | 57 |
| B. J. Crombeen^{†} | 66 | 11 | 6 | 17 | -8 | 122 |
| Paul Kariya | 11 | 2 | 13 | 15 | +1 | 2 |
| Roman Polak | 69 | 1 | 14 | 15 | -15 | 45 |
| Lee Stempniak^{‡} | 14 | 3 | 10 | 13 | -3 | 2 |
| Jay McKee | 69 | 1 | 7 | 8 | +11 | 44 |
| Mike Weaver | 58 | 0 | 7 | 7 | -3 | 12 |
| Yan Stastny | 34 | 3 | 4 | 7 | -14 | 20 |
| Eric Brewer | 28 | 1 | 5 | 6 | -14 | 24 |
| Dan Hinote | 51 | 1 | 4 | 5 | -7 | 64 |
| Cam Janssen | 56 | 1 | 3 | 4 | -5 | 131 |
| Steve Regier | 8 | 3 | 1 | 4 | -1 | 4 |
| Steven Wagner | 22 | 2 | 2 | 4 | -5 | 18 |
| Cam Paddock | 16 | 2 | 1 | 3 | -4 | 0 |
| Tyson Strachan | 30 | 0 | 3 | 3 | +8 | 39 |
| Chris Porter | 6 | 1 | 1 | 2 | -1 | 0 |
| Trent Whitfield | 3 | 0 | 1 | 1 | +2 | 0 |
| D. J. King | 1 | 0 | 1 | 1 | 0 | 0 |
| Alex Pietrangelo | 8 | 0 | 1 | 1 | 0 | 2 |
| David Koci^{‡} | 4 | 0 | 0 | 0 | -2 | 9 |
| Andy Wozniewski^{‡} | 1 | 0 | 0 | 0 | 0 | 0 |
| Jonas Junland | 1 | 0 | 0 | 0 | 0 | 2 |

Playoffs

| Player | GP | G | A | Pts | +/− | PIM |
|---|---|---|---|---|---|---|
| Andy McDonald | 4 | 1 | 3 | 4 | +1 | 0 |
| Brad Boyes | 4 | 2 | 1 | 3 | -1 | 0 |
| David Backes | 4 | 1 | 2 | 3 | +1 | 10 |
| David Perron | 4 | 1 | 1 | 2 | +3 | 4 |
| Barret Jackman | 4 | 0 | 1 | 1 | -2 | 5 |
| Alexander Steen | 4 | 0 | 1 | 1 | -3 | 0 |
| Dan Hinote | 3 | 0 | 0 | 0 | -1 | 4 |
| Jay McKee | 4 | 0 | 0 | 0 | 0 | 4 |
| Keith Tkachuk | 4 | 0 | 0 | 0 | -1 | 2 |
| Mike Weaver | 4 | 0 | 0 | 0 | +1 | 0 |
| Jeff Woywitka | 4 | 0 | 0 | 0 | -1 | 0 |
| Carlo Colaiacovo | 4 | 0 | 0 | 0 | 0 | 2 |
| Jay McClement | 4 | 0 | 0 | 0 | -4 | 4 |
| Brad Winchester | 4 | 0 | 0 | 0 | -4 | 10 |
| Cam Janssen | 1 | 0 | 0 | 0 | 0 | 0 |
| Roman Polak | 4 | 0 | 0 | 0 | -3 | 0 |
| Patrik Berglund | 4 | 0 | 0 | 0 | 0 | 2 |
| T. J. Oshie | 4 | 0 | 0 | 0 | 0 | 2 |
| B. J. Crombeen | 4 | 0 | 0 | 0 | -2 | 12 |

=== Goaltenders ===
Note: Pos = Position;GP = Games played; Min, TOI = Minutes played; W = Wins; L = Losses; T,T/OT = Ties; OTL = Overtime losses; GA = Goals-against; GAA = Goals-against average; SO = Shutouts; SA = Shots against; SV = Shots saved; SV% = Save percentage;

Regular season

| Player | GP | Min | W | L | OT | GA | GAA | SA | SV | Sv% | SO |
|---|---|---|---|---|---|---|---|---|---|---|---|
| Chris Mason | 57 | 3,214 | 27 | 21 | 7 | 129 | 2.41 | 1,544 | 1,415 | .916 | 6 |
| Manny Legace | 29 | 1,452 | 13 | 9 | 2 | 77 | 3.18 | 669 | 592 | .885 | 0 |
| Ben Bishop | 6 | 244 | 1 | 1 | 1 | 12 | 2.94 | 112 | 100 | .893 | 0 |
| Marek Schwarz | 2 | 15 | 0 | 0 | 0 | 0 | 0.00 | 5 | 5 | 1.000 | 0 |
| Chris Holt | 1 | 18 | 0 | 0 | 0 | 0 | 0.00 | 3 | 3 | 1.000 | 0 |
| TOTALS | 82 | 4,943 | 41 | 31 | 10 | 218 | 2.65 | 2,333 | 2,115 | .907 | 6 |

Playoffs

| Player | GP | Min | W | L | GA | GAA | SA | SV | Sv% | SO |
|---|---|---|---|---|---|---|---|---|---|---|
| Chris Mason | 4 | 256 | 0 | 4 | 10 | 2.34 | 119 | 109 | .916 | 0 |

^{†}Denotes player spent time with another team before joining Blues. Stats reflect time with Blues only.
^{‡}Traded mid-season. Stats reflect time with Blues only.

== Awards and records ==
=== Milestones ===
Regular season
| Player | Milestone | Reached |
| Alex Pietrangelo | 1st NHL Game | October 10, 2008 |
| Patrik Berglund | 1st NHL Goal | October 13, 2008 |
| Keith Tkachuk | 1,000th NHL Point (511th Goal) | November 30, 2008 |
| Tyson Strachan | 1st NHL Game | December 18, 2008 |
| Jonas Junland | 1st NHL Game | December 18, 2008 |
| Roman Polak | 1st NHL Goal | December 20, 2008 |
| Tyson Strachan | 1st NHL Point (Assist) | December 21, 2008 |
| Keith Tkachuk | 500th NHL Assist (#16) | January 19, 2009 |
| Andy Murray (coach) | 300th NHL Win | February 19, 2009 |
| Andy Murray (coach) | 100th Blues Win | April 10, 2009 |

== Transactions ==
=== Trades ===
| June 4, 2008 | To St. Louis Blues T. J. Fast (D) | To Los Angeles Kings 5th round draft pick in 2009 |
| June 19, 2008 | To St. Louis Blues 3rd round draft pick (#70) in 2008 | To Toronto Maple Leafs Jamal Mayers (RW) |
| June 20, 2008 | To St. Louis Blues Chris Mason (G) | To Nashville Predators 4th round draft pick in 2008 |
| November 24, 2008 | To St. Louis Blues Alexander Steen (C), Carlo Colaiacovo (D) | To Toronto Maple Leafs Lee Stempniak (RW) |
| December 19, 2008 | To St. Louis Blues Jonathan Filewich (RW) | To Pittsburgh Penguins 6th round draft pick in 2010 |
| March 4, 2009 | To St. Louis Blues Danny Richmond (D) | To Pittsburgh Penguins Andy Wozniewski (D) |

=== Free agents ===
| Player | Former team | Contract Terms |
| Mike Weaver | Vancouver Canucks | ($ unknown) Blues Sign Defenseman Mike Weaver (July 10) |
| Matt Foy | Minnesota Wild | ($ unknown) Blues Sign Forward Matt Foy (July 14) |
| Cam Paddock | San Antonio Rampage (AHL) | ($ unknown) Blues Sign Forwards Paddock, Regier (July 15) |
| Steve Regier | Bridgeport Sound Tigers (AHL) | ($ unknown) Blues Sign Forwards Paddock, Regier (July 15) |
| Brad Winchester | Dallas Stars | ($ unknown) Blues Ink Forward Brad Winchester (July 16) |
| Andy Wozniewski | Toronto Maple Leafs | ($ unknown) Blues Sign Defenseman Andy Wozniewski (July 17) |
| Tyson Strachan (D) | Peoria Rivermen (AHL) | ($ unknown) Blues Sign Free Agent Tyson Strachan (Oct. 9) |
| Chris Holt | New York Rangers | ($ unknown) Blues Add Depth, Sign Goalie Chris Holt (Oct. 30) |

| Player | New team |
| Ryan Johnson | Vancouver Canucks (July 2) |
| Matt Walker | Chicago Blackhawks (July 7) |
| Mike Glumac | Montreal Canadiens (July 16) |

=== Claimed from waivers ===
| Player | Former team | Date claimed off waivers |
|---|---|---|
| David Koci (LW) | Tampa Bay Lightning | October 21 |
| B. J. Crombeen (RW) | Dallas Stars | November 18 |

=== Placed on waivers ===
| Player | Waiver Date |
| Manny Legace | February 6 |

=== Signed prospects ===
| Player | Signing Date |
| Philip McRae (F) | March 12 |
| Anthony Peluso (F) | March 12 |
| Brett Sonne (F) | March 12 |
| Aaron Palushaj (F) | April 3 |

=== Contract renewals ===
| Player | Contract Terms (yrs, $/yr.) |
| Yan Stastny | 2 yrs. ($ unknown) Blues Sign Stastny to 2-Year Deal (July 3, 2008) |
| Andy McDonald | 4 yrs. ($4.7 mil./yr.) Blues Ink McDonald to 4-Year Extension; Blues sign center Andy McDonald to 4-year, $18.8 million contract extension (February 9) |
| Jay McClement | 3 yrs. ($ $1.45 mil./yr.) McClement signs 3-year extension McClement Signs Multi-Year Contract (May 26) |
| Keith Tkachuk | 1 yr. ($2.15 mil.) St. Louis Blues sign Keith Tkachuk to one-year, $2.15 million deal (June 19) Blues Re-Sign Keith Tkachuk: 5-Time All-Star returns for 18th NHL season, wanted to remain a Blue |

== Draft picks ==
St. Louis's picks at the 2008 NHL entry draft in Ottawa, Ontario, June 20-June 21, 2008.

| Round | Pick | Player | Position | Shoots | Nationality | League | Birthplace, Date | Height, Weight |
|---|---|---|---|---|---|---|---|---|
| 1 | 4 | Alex Pietrangelo | D | R | Canada | Ontario Hockey League | King City, ON January 18, 1990 | 6' 3", 206 lbs. |
| 2 (from ATL) | 33 | Philip McRae | C | L | United States | Ontario Hockey League | Minneapolis, MN March 15, 1990 | 6' 2", 189 lbs. |
| 2 | 34 | Jake Allen | G | L (gloves) | Canada | Quebec Major Junior Hockey League | Fredericton, NB August 7, 1990 | 6' 2", 175 lbs. |
| 3 | 65 | Jori Lehtera | C | L | Finland | SM-liiga | Helsinki, Finland December 23, 1987 | 6' 2", 191 lbs. |
| 3 (from FL) | 70 | James Livingston | RW | R | Canada | Ontario Hockey League | Halifax, NS March 8, 1990 | 6' 1", 200 lbs. |
| 3 (from SJ) | 87 | Ian Schultz | RW | R | Canada | Western Hockey League | Calgary, AB March 8, 1990 | 6' 1", 179 lbs. |
| 4 | 95 | David Warsofsky | D | L | United States | US National Team Development Program U-18 | Marshfield, MA May 30, 1990 | 5' 8", 160 lbs. |
| 5 | 125 | Kristoffer Berglund | D | L | Sweden | Sweden-2 League | Umeå, Sweden August 12, 1988 | 5' 10", 180 lbs. |
| 6 | 155 | Anthony Nigro | C | L | Canada | Ontario Hockey League | Vaughan, ON January 11, 1990 | 6' 0", 189 lbs. |
| 7 | 185 | Paul Karpowich | G | L (gloves) | Canada | Ontario Provincial Junior A Hockey League | Thunder Bay, ON October 25, 1988 | 6' 0", 160 lbs. |

== See also ==
- 2008–09 NHL season
- St. Louis Blues seasons
- St. Louis (sports)

== Farm teams ==
=== Peoria Rivermen ===
The Peoria Rivermen are the Blues American Hockey League affiliate in 2008–09.

=== Alaska Aces ===
The Alaska Aces are the Blues affiliate in the ECHL.
