= Frédéric Chartier =

Canadian ice hockey player

- Born: May 31, 1975 (age 51) Trois-Rivières, Quebec
- Height: 5 ft 11 in (180 cm)
- Weight: 200 lb (91 kg; 14 st 4 lb)
- Position: Right wing
- Shot: Right
- NHL draft: Undrafted
- Playing career: 1999–2001

Frédéric Chartier (born May 31, 1975) is a Canadian former ice hockey player. He won the Michel Brière Memorial Trophy as the Most Valuable Player in the Quebec Major Junior Hockey League for his outstanding play with the Laval Titan during the 1994–95 QMJHL season.

== Career statistics ==
			Regular season					Playoffs
Season	Team	League	GP	G	A	Pts	PIM	GP	G	A	Pts	PIM
1990–91	Cantons de l'Est Cantonniers	QMAAA	7	1	2	3	2	—	—	—	—	—
1991–92	Magog Cantonniers	QMAAA	30	7	14	21	56	—	—	—	—	—
1992–93	Laval Titan	QMJHL	62	10	18	28	59	12	1	2	3	10
1992–93	Laval Titan	MC	—	—	—	—	—	5	0	0	0	0
1993–94	Laval Titan	QMJHL	72	28	54	82	143	19	5	6	11	32
1993–94	Laval Titan	MC	—	—	—	—	—	5	1	1	2	4
1994–95	Laval Titan Collège Français	QMJHL	72	51	59	110	159	20	10	9	19	28
1995–96	Beauport Harfangs	QMJHL	62	49	71	120	81	20	9	9	18	36
1996–97	Université du Québec à Trois-Rivières	RSEC	23	9	10	19	57	—	—	—	—	—
1997–98	Université du Québec à Trois-Rivières	RSEC	26	18	19	37	—	—	—	—	—	—
1998–99	Université du Québec à Trois-Rivières	RSEC	26	7	19	26	38	—	—	—	—	—
1999–2000	Jonquière Condors	QSPHL	37	26	35	61	74	7	2	3	5	24
2000–01	Jonquière Condors	QSPHL	27	17	29	46	43	—	—	—	—	—
2004–05	Saint-Tite Mustangs	LHSPAA	5	4	1	5	2	—	—	—	—	—
QMJHL totals			268	138	202	340	442	71	25	26	51	106
