= Jos Canale =

Canadian ice hockey coach (born 1949)

- Born: Giuseppe Canale; September 21, 1949 (age 77); Laval, Quebec, Canada
- Education: Loyola College
- Known for: Ice hockey coach
- Awards: Hockey Québec Hall of Fame, CHL Coach of the Year Award (1990–91), Gold medal at the World Juniors in 1994

Jos Canale (born Giuseppe Canale; September 21, 1949) is a Canadian former ice hockey coach, commonly known as Joe Canale. He was the 1991 recipient of the Coach of the Year Award in the Canadian Hockey League (CHL), and later coached the Canada men's national junior ice hockey team to a gold medal at the 1994 World Junior Ice Hockey Championships. He served as a head coach for more than 700 games in the Quebec Major Junior Hockey League (QMJHL), which included a 1991 Memorial Cup appearance, and twice being chosen to represent his league at the CHL All–Star Challenge. Canale later coached in the Western Hockey League and the Ontario Hockey League, becoming the first person to do so in all three leagues of the CHL. Near the end of his career Canale made headlines for a stick-swinging incident in a QMJHL playoff game. He was later inducted into the Halls of Fame for both Hockey Québec, and the Quebec Midget AAA Hockey League.

== Early life ==
Canale was born on September 21, 1949. He is a native of Laval, Quebec. He played minor ice hockey as a youth, until the midget age group. He graduated from Loyola College in Montreal, studying business administration.

== Coaching career ==
=== Early coaching career ===
Canale began coaching ice hockey with midget age level teams in the Notre-Dame-de-Grâce area of Montreal. His first opportunity to coach in the Quebec Major Junior Hockey League (QMJHL) came during the 1977–78 QMJHL season, when he was the second of four head coaches of the Shawinigan Dynamos. Canale's season was cut short on February 20, 1978, when he was arrested by the Royal Canadian Mounted Police, charged with drug trafficking at a coffeehouse in Montreal, and later pardoned. He had been convicted of trafficking mescaline, and served 18 months in prison.

Canale returned to coaching in the early 1980s, spending four seasons in the Montreal Junior B Hockey League with the Southwest Dukes, Bourassa Angevins, Montreal Canadiens-Bourassa, Richelieu Riverains, and the LaSalle Cyclones. During this time he won a playoff championship, a bronze medal at the 1983 Winter Canada Games, and coached Pierre Turgeon, Stéphane Fiset and Patrice Brisebois.

=== Chicoutimi Saguenéens ===
Potvin speaks about Canale

"Canale was one of the best coaches we ever had. He cared about us as people, but he also knew the right time to lean on us and push us."

— Félix Potvin, 2011

Canale was hired by the Chicoutimi Saguenéens for the 1990–91 QMJHL season, with Richard Martel as his assistant coach. He led Chicoutimi to 43 wins, 92 points, and won the Jean Rougeau Trophy as the first place team in the league. The Saguenéens allowed the fewest goals in the league with 223, while scoring 299 goals. In the playoffs, Chicoutimi defeated the Shawinigan Cataractes in six games, then defeated the Laval Titan in seven games, and swept the Drummondville Voltigeurs in four games in the finals. With the win, Canale led Chicoutimi to its first President's Cup championship.

Chicoutimi and Drummondville both advanced to the 1991 Memorial Cup as champion and runner-up, since the QMJHL was the host league that season. The Quebec teams played on home ice at the Colisée de Québec, and faced the Spokane Chiefs from the Western Hockey League (WHL), and the Sault Ste. Marie Greyhounds from the Ontario Hockey League (OHL). Canale led Chicoutimi to victory in its first game, in a 2–1 win over the Greyhounds. After the game, the team was fined $250 by Canadian Hockey League president Ed Chynoweth, for a pregame incident. Canale's team lost 7–1 against Spokane, in a game which included eight players ejected, a brawl in the third period, and 226 total penalty minutes. Drummondville won 5–3 over Chicoutimi in the final round-robin game, and the two teams played each other again the semifinal, with Drummondville winning 2–1 in overtime, when Chicoutimi scored an own-goal.

Canale returned for the 1991–92 QMJHL season, and in February he shared the head coaching duties with Ted Nolan for the combined OHL and QMJHL all-stars at the 1992 CHL All-Star Challenge. His Chicoutimi team finished the season third place in the Dilio division. In the playoffs, they were defeated four games to none by the Shawinigan Cataractes in the first round. In the 1992–93 QMJHL season, Canale repeated the third-place finished in the Dilio division, and Chicoutimi were swept in four games in the first round of the playoffs by the Sherbrooke Faucons.

=== National coaching duties ===
Canale began coaching for Hockey Canada as an assistant coach for the under-17 Quebec team in 1990. He returned the following season as an assistant coach for the Canada men's national under-18 ice hockey team in 1991, working with head coach Dave Siciliano. Two years later, he was named an assistant coach for the Canada men's national junior ice hockey team, working with head coach Perry Pearn at the 1993 World Junior Ice Hockey Championships, in which the Canadian team won the gold medal.

Canale was announced as the Canadian junior team's head coach for the 1994 World Junior Ice Hockey Championships on June 5, 1993, with Danny Flynn and Mike Johnston to be his assistant coaches. Author Gare Joyce said that Canale was considered a controversial selection to be the head coach, but he left a lasting impression on his players. Canale felt pressured to win a gold medal based on past results, and stressed the importance of building team chemistry and character. The selection camp was missing ten prominent players from the previous championship due to commitments with the National Hockey League or the Canada men's national ice hockey team, and were not expected to repeat as champions.

Canale selected his team on the need balance skill with size and strength, and said that it was more difficult to choose the two goaltenders, Jamie Storr and Manny Fernandez. Only three players returned from the 1993 team, Brent Tully, Martin Gendron, and Joël Bouchard. Canale named Tully the team captain. The 1994 World Juniors were hosted in the Czech Republic, and the previous coach Perry Pearn attended for moral support, while on break from coaching at HC Ambrì-Piotta.

Canale's Team Canada won its first game 5–1 over Switzerland, then defeated Germany by a 5–2 score. Canada relinquished a 3–0 lead over Russia in its third game, and settled for a 3–3 tie game. Canale led Canada to a 6–3 victory over Finland, followed by an 8–3 victory over the United States, and a 6–4 victory over the Czech Republic. Canada was scheduled to play Sweden in the final game of the round-robin, with the winner finishing first overall, and claiming the gold medal. Canale said that Canada needed to play better defensively in the neutral zone, and made the decision to play Storr instead of Fernandez in goal. Canada prevailed with a 6–4 victory over Sweden, giving Canale a second gold medal at the World Juniors.

Canale won a total of three gold medals, one silver medal, and two bronze medals while coaching the under-17, under-18, and under-20 Canadian teams. As of 2018, he is the only QMJHL coach to lead the Canadian juniors to a gold medal at the World Juniors. He later assisted Dave King at a preparatory camp for the Japan men's national ice hockey team in advance of the 1998 Winter Olympics in Nagano.

=== Beauport Harfangs ===
Canale joined the Beauport Harfangs in 1993, and coached the team for two and a half seasons. During the 1993–94 QMJHL season while playing home games at the Aréna Marcel-Bédard, he nicknamed it "le petit cabane" in French, or "the little shack" in English. Later in the season, he was suspended for three games for threatening a referee with a hockey stick, Canale led the Harfangs to the franchise's first playoff berth in its history, and a third-place finish in the Dilio division for the 1993–94 season. His team defeated the Shawinigan Cataractes four games to one in the first round of playoffs, then placed fourth in a round-robin of the top six team remaining teams, then lost in the third round in four games to the Laval Titan. In the 1994–95 QMJHL season, Canale shared the head coaching duties with Don Hay of the combined QMJHL and WHL all-stars at the 1995 CHL All-Star Challenge. He led Beauport to first place in the Dilio division, and second overall in the QMJHL. The Harfangs won their first round playoff series four games to three over the Halifax Mooseheads, where the home team won each game. Beauport finished first place in a round-robin of the remaining six teams, then lost in the third round of the playoffs in five games to the Hull Olympiques. Canale began the first 39 games of the 1995–96 QMJHL season with 18 wins, 19 losses, and 2 ties. He was released from the Harfangs on December 26, and replaced by Alain Vigneault as coach.

=== Medicine Hat Tigers ===
Canale joined the Medicine Hat Tigers in the Western Hockey League on January 6, 1996, after the team fired head coach Brad McEwen, and his assistants. The remainder of the 1995–96 WHL season was his first opportunity to coach full-time speaking in English, outside of the Canadian junior team. Perry Pearn said that Canale could have success with the situation in Medicine Hat, and that moving out of Quebec would be good for him. Canale led Medicine Hat with an assistant coach, because he felt it easier for the players to get used to only one new coach, and he frequently consulted with the team's trainer about the players. In February, Canale changed the captain and assistants, naming Paxton Schafer, the team's goaltender as an unofficial assistant captain. In the final 32 games of the regular season, Canale led the Tigers to 18 wins, 13 losses, and 1 tie. Medicine Hat placed third in the central division with 65 points, and sixth place in the eastern conference. Canale's team lost in five games in the first round of the playoffs to the Prince Albert Raiders. He sought a minimum two-year contract to return as coach. The team and Canale agreed on money and the length of contract, but couldn't come to a complete agreement. He said that he had been approached by other teams, but wanted to remain and finish what he started. Canale asked for an escape clause in his contract in case a professional team hired him, and did not come to terms with Medicine Hat.

=== Sarnia Sting ===
Canale was hired to be head coach of the Sarnia Sting for the 1996–97 OHL season, signing a two-year contract with an escape clause. Sarnia initially did not want to bring in someone unfamiliar with the Ontario Hockey League, but the decision made Canale the first person to be a head coach in all three leagues in the Canadian Hockey League. He remained the only coach with that distinction as of 2010, until the feat was later matched by Danny Flynn, Mike Kelly, and Ron Harris. In November 1996, Canale admitted that he was losing motivation to coach in the juniors, but remained as he still had a desire to win a Memorial Cup. Canale was suspended three games resulting from a player leaving the bench to fight, and while suspended he was later seen talking to assistant coaches and players after a pre-game warm-up, but no further action was taken by the league. Sarnia finished the season second place in the west division, defeated the Windsor Spitfires 4 games to 1 in the first round of the playoffs, but lost to the Kitchener Rangers in seven games in round two. Canale resigned as head coach of Sarnia in May 1997.

=== Laval Titan Collège Français ===
Canale returned home to coach the Laval Titan Collège Français for the 1997–98 QMJHL season. During the season, he was suspended two games due to his team being involved in too many fights. He was fired with 11 games remaining in the season, and replaced by Paulin Bordeleau.

=== Sherbrooke Castors ===
Canale became head coach of the Sherbrooke Castors for the 1998–99 QMJHL season. He led the Castors to a fourth-place finish in the regular season, then defeated the Val-d'Or Foreurs in six games in the first round of the playoffs, then lost to the Rouyn-Noranda Huskies in seven games in the second round. During the 1999–2000 QMJHL season, Canale was suspended four games in October for his role in a bench-clearing brawl. His team finished third place in the central division, fourth overall in the Lebel conference, and faced the fifth place Rouyn-Noranda Huskies in the playoffs, a rematch from the previous season.

Sherbrooke lost two of the first three games by one goal each, and played game four on the road in Rouyn-Noranda on March 27, 2000. In the last minute of game four, Canale protested the decision of the referee, by climbing on the bench and banging on the boards with a hockey stick, while screaming and making an obscene gesture, and was ejected from the match. Another incident broke out between the two teams with four seconds remaining in the game, and Canale returned to the bench and was involved in a stick-swinging altercation with spectators. The game ended with the final score 3-1 for the Huskies. Canale was arrested after the game, questioned by local police, and released with a promise to appear later in court. He faced a charged of assault with a weapon, and would serve up to 18 months in prison if found guilty. Canale attempted to keep the series alive as he coached Sherbrooke in game five of the series at home on March 29, 2000, but was eliminated from the playoffs with a 6–5 loss.

The QMJHL commissioner Gilles Courteau fined Canale $1,000, with a suspension pending. The league did not consider a lifetime nor a one-year suspension, since his behaviour was not considered recurrent. Canale served his 16-game suspension at the beginning of the 2000–01 QMJHL season, which included 6 exhibition games and 10 regular season games. He led Sherbrooke to a fourth-place finish in central division, but lost four games to none in the playoffs lost versus the Val-d'Or Foreurs. In August 2001, Canale was found guilty of assault with a weapon as a result of the incident in the 2000 playoffs, and given an absolute discharge without a fine or jail time.

=== Drummondville Voltigeurs ===
Canale took over as head coach of the Drummondville Voltigeurs with twenty games remaining in the 2001–02 QMJHL season, replacing Daniel Bissonnette. He led the team into the second round of playoffs, losing to the Shawinigan Cataractes.

== Coaching style ==
Sports as a parallel to life

"You have kids in there who don't know it's a hard world out there. They're finding out winning isn't as easy as turning on the hot and cold water."

— Joe Canale, 1996

Canale was described by Perry Pearn as "showing emotion, fairly vocal, straightforward, good communicator, and demanding". He also had a reputation as intense, emotional, and knowledgeable. He often told stories to players, using analogies in relating to real-life situations. In practices he emphasized a good attitude, good work ethic, and being prepared. As coach, he didn't want to turn off the players by being emotional, but wanted to be consistent even if the team was not, and thought it was never too late to improve. He liked to use four offensive lines consistently to learn what talents he had to work with. Canale was a former smoker, liked to rattle coins in his pockets while standing behind the bench, and would shuffle the coins about in his hands between periods.

Canale felt that QMJHL teams had an inferiority complex, and were intimidated by the other leagues at the Memorial Cup. He said "there's a psychological aspect to it", and that "teams have psyched themselves out", in reference to his experience at the 1991 Memorial Cup, and Quebec teams not winning a Memorial Cup since 1971.

== Coaching record ==
Season-by-season coaching record:

Season	Team	League	GP	W	L	T	OTL	Pts	Pct	Standing	Playoffs / notes
1977–78	Shawinigan Dynamos	QMJHL	33	2	29	2	–	6	0.091	5th, Dilio	Arrested February 20, 1978
1990–91	Chicoutimi Saguenéens	QMJHL	68	42	21	5	–	89	0.654	1st, Dilio	President's Cup champions 3rd place, 1991 Memorial Cup
1991–92	Chicoutimi Saguenéens	QMJHL	67	29	32	6	–	64	0.478	3rd, Dilio	Lost in round 1
1992–93	Chicoutimi Saguenéens	QMJHL	64	35	26	3	–	73	0.570	3rd, Dilio	Lost in round 1
1993–94	Beauport Harfangs	QMJHL	64	32	28	4	–	68	0.531	3rd, Dilio	Lost in round 3
1994–95	Beauport Harfangs	QMJHL	69	37	23	9	–	83	0.601	1st, Dilio	Lost in round 3
1995–96	Beauport Harfangs	QMJHL	39	18	19	2	–	38	0.487	(1st, Dilio)	Released December 26, 1995
1995–96	Medicine Hat Tigers	WHL	32	18	13	1	–	37	0.578	3rd, Central	Lost in round 1
1996–97	Sarnia Sting	OHL	66	35	24	7	–	77	0.583	2nd, West	Lost in round 2
1997–98	Laval Titan Collège Français	QMJHL	57	33	20	4	–	70	0.614	(5th, Lebel)	Fired, 11 games remaining
1998–99	Sherbrooke Castors	QMJHL	70	31	34	5	–	67	0.479	4th, Lebel	Lost in round 2
1999–2000	Sherbrooke Castors	QMJHL	66	30	29	7	0	68	0.508	3rd, Central	Lost in round 1
2000–01	Sherbrooke Castors	QMJHL	63	22	38	3	0	50	0.373	4th, Central	Lost in round 1
2001–02	Sherbrooke Castors	QMJHL	11	1	9	1	0	3	0.136	(4th, Central)	Fired after 11 games
2001–02	Drummondville Voltigeurs	QMJHL	20	10	10	0	0	20	0.500	3rd, Central	Lost in round 2
QMJHL totals			691	322	318	51	0	699	0.503	2 division titles	1 championship
WHL/OHL totals			98	53	37	8	–	114	0.582	–	–

== Later hockey career ==
Canale took a year off from hockey in the 2002–03 season. He served as the technical director of the Quebec Midget AAA Hockey League from 2004 to 2015, and advised and assisted its coaches. During this time, Canale acted as a coaching advisor for Team Quebec, and declined offers for scouting positions with National Hockey League teams, because he preferred to work directly with coaches. He worked as an advisor with the St. John's Fog Devils from the 2005–06 QMJHL season, to the 2007–08 QMJHL season. He was hired by the Quebec Remparts for the 2009–10 QMJHL season as an advisor and scout, and highly recommended Alexandre Grenier. He also spent significant time scouting European players for the CHL Import Draft on behalf of the Remparts. Canale rejoined the Chicoutimi Saguenéens as an advisor for the 2010–11 QMJHL season. He temporarily took over the general manager's duties until the end of the season when Richard Martel was fired. He returned to the Saguenéens as an advisor for the 2011–12 QMJHL season.

== Honours and awards ==
Canale was named a first-team all-star coach with the Chicoutimi Saguenéens by the QMJHL in the 1990–91 season, equivalent to the modern Ron Lapointe Trophy as the QMJHL Coach of the Year. In the same season, he was honoured with the CHL Coach of the Year Award, as the best overall junior ice hockey coach from the QMJHL, OHL or WHL. In 2013, Canale was inducted into the Quebec Midget AAA Hockey League Hall of Fame, and inducted into the Hockey Québec Hall of Fame. Canale and other members from the 1993 and 1994 World Junior championship Canadian teams, were recognized during the 2015 World Junior Ice Hockey Championships in Toronto. In 2018, Canale received the Denis-Baillairgé Award from the Quebec Junior Hockey League in recognition of his contributions to Quebec hockey.

== Personal life ==
His birth name was Giuseppe Canale, but he did a legal name change to "Jos", when he became fond of the diminutive nickname for Joseph, which was popularized by media during his tenure in Chicoutimi. He is a partial owner of a tree care business. He is married to Manon, has one daughter and a granddaughter.

== Bibliography ==
- Lapp, Richard M.; Macaulay, Alec (1997). The Memorial Cup: Canada's National Junior Hockey Championship. Madeira Park, British Columbia: Harbour Publishing. ISBN 1-55017-170-4.
- Bell, Aaron. Canadian Hockey League Information/Accommodations Guide and Record Book. Vol. 2007–08. Toronto: Canadian Hockey League.
- Joyce, Gare (2011). Thirty Years Of The Game At Its Best. Toronto, Ontario: Penguin Group. ISBN 978-0-143-18197-2.
