= Aréna Marcel-Bédard =

Multi-purpose arena in Quebec, Canada

Coordinates: 46.8575°N 71.1897°W

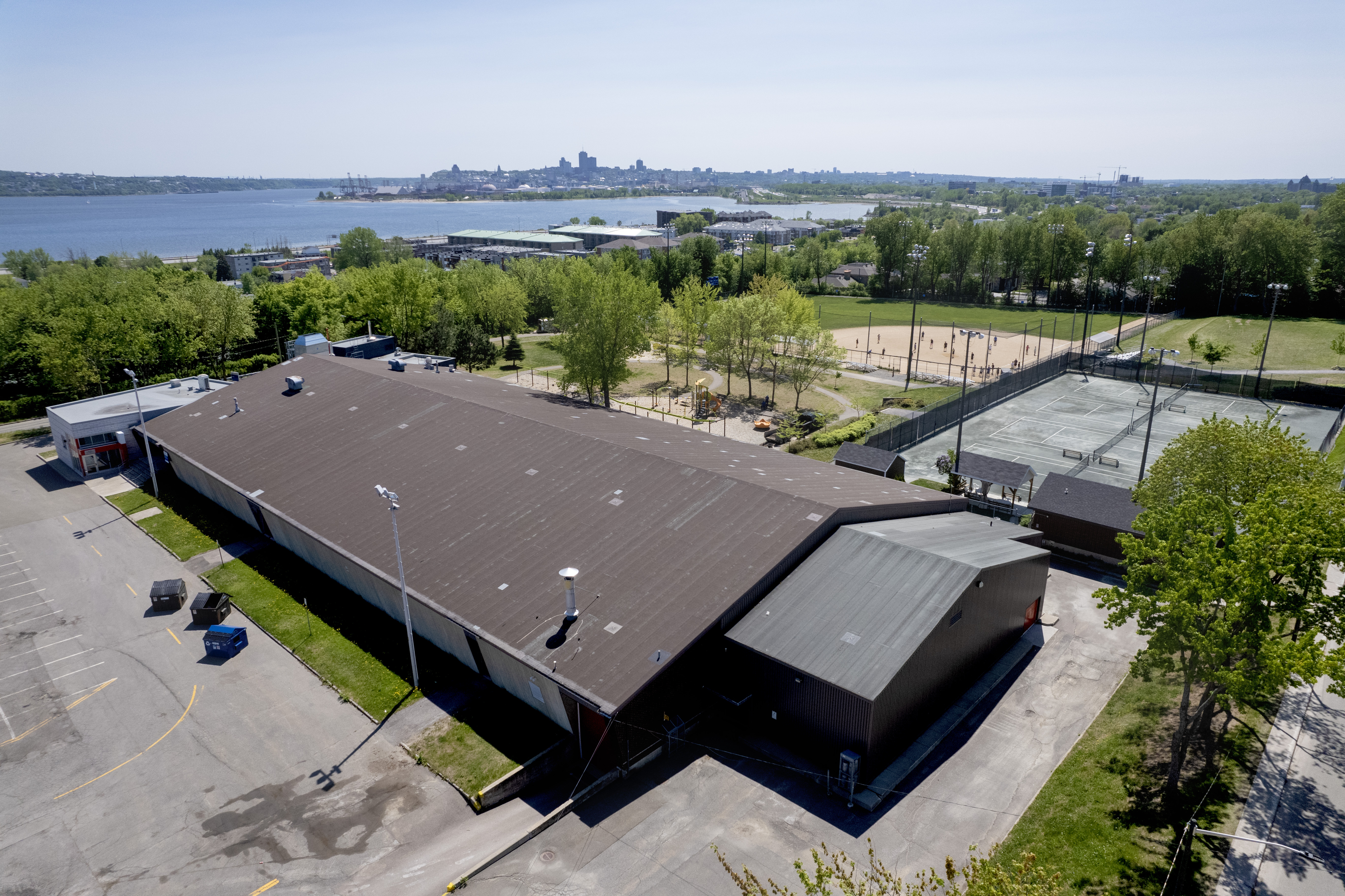
Aréna Marcel-Bédard

The Arena Marcel Bedard is a multi-purpose arena in Beauport, Quebec. It has a capacity of 2,000 people. It hosted the Beauport Harfangs ice hockey team. Its surname is 'La petite cabane' (the little shack) in honour of Beauport's colourful coach, Jos Canale.
