= 1994–95 QMJHL season =

Canadian junior ice hockey season

The 1994–95 QMJHL season was the 26th season in the history of the Quebec Major Junior Hockey League. The QMJHL unveils an updated logo one season after its special 25th anniversary logo, using a stylized ice skate and the letters of the league's French acronym. The season also marked the first expansion by the QMJHL into Atlantic Canada, with the addition of the Halifax Mooseheads.

Several of the league's trophies are renamed, as corporate sponsorships expire. The Shell Cups are renamed the Ford Cups, one each for the offensive and defensive players of the year. The Transamerica Plaque is renamed the AutoPro Plaque, and the Molson Cup is renamed the New Faces Cup.

Thirteen teams played 72 games each in the schedule. The Laval Titan Collège Français finished first overall in the regular season, for their second consecutive Jean Rougeau Trophy, and made their third consecutive appearance in the finals. The Hull Olympiques won their third President's Cup, defeating Laval 4 games to 1.

== Team changes ==
- The Halifax Mooseheads join the league as an expansion franchise, playing in the Dilio Division.
- Verdun Collège Français cease operations. The Collège Français transfers its sponsorship to the Laval Titan.
- The Laval Titan are renamed the Laval Titan Collège Français.

== Final standings ==
Note: GP = Games played; W = Wins; L = Losses; T = Ties; Pts = Points; GF = Goals for; GA = Goals against

Dilio Division	GP	W	L	T	Pts	GF	GA
Beauport Harfangs	72	39	24	9	87	291	220
Shawinigan Cataractes	72	40	28	4	84	325	270
Chicoutimi Saguenéens	72	38	29	5	81	290	269
Sherbrooke Faucons	72	37	30	5	79	298	251
Drummondville Voltigeurs	72	31	38	3	65	272	302
Halifax Mooseheads	72	24	42	6	54	257	317
Victoriaville Tigres	72	24	45	3	51	266	371

Lebel Division	GP	W	L	T	Pts	GF	GA
Laval Titan Collège Français	72	48	22	2	98	302	232
Hull Olympiques	72	42	28	2	86	340	274
Saint-Jean Lynx	72	39	27	6	84	282	277
Granby Bisons	72	31	36	5	67	314	294
Saint-Hyacinthe Laser	72	26	42	4	56	241	310
Val-d'Or Foreurs	72	21	49	2	44	232	341

- Complete list of standings.

== Scoring leaders ==
Note: GP = Games played; G = Goals; A = Assists; Pts = Points; PIM = Penalty minutes

Player	Team	GP	G	A	Pts	PIM
Patrick Carignan	Shawinigan Cataractes	71	37	100	137	43
Sebastien Bordeleau	Hull Olympiques	68	52	76	128	142
Danny Briere	Drummondville Voltigeurs	72	51	72	123	54
Christian Matte	Granby Bisons	66	50	66	116	86
Alain Savage	Shawinigan Cataractes	71	55	57	112	112
Frederic Chartier	Laval Titan Collège Français	72	51	59	110	159
Serge Aubin	Granby Bisons	60	37	73	110	55
Mathieu Dandenault	Sherbrooke Faucons	67	37	70	107	76
Christian Dubé	Sherbrooke Faucons	71	36	65	101	43
Aleksey Lozhkin	Chicoutimi Saguenéens	57	43	58	101	26

- Complete scoring statistics.

== Playoffs ==
Sebastien Bordeleau was the leading scorer of the playoffs with 32 points (13 goals, 19 assists).

First round

- Laval Titan Collège Français defeated Victoriaville Tigres 4 games to 0.
- Beauport Harfangs defeated Halifax Mooseheads 4 games to 3.
- Hull Olympiques defeated Saint-Hyacinthe Laser 4 games to 1.
- Shawinigan Cataractes defeated Drummondville Voltigeurs 4 games to 0.
- Granby Bisons defeated Saint-Jean Lynx 4 games to 3.
- Chicoutimi Saguenéens defeated Sherbrooke Faucons 4 games to 3.

Quarterfinals

Note: GP = Games played; W = Wins; L = Losses; T = Ties; Pts = Points; GF = Goals for; GA = Goals against

Round-robin standings	GP	W	L	T	Pts	GF	GA
Laval Titan Collège Français	6	5	1	0	10	28	17
Beauport Harfangs	6	5	1	0	10	30	17
Hull Olympiques	6	3	3	0	6	26	23
Shawinigan Cataractes	6	3	3	0	6	28	29
Chicoutimi Saguenéens	6	2	4	0	4	19	20
Granby Bisons	6	0	6	0	0	10	35

Semifinals

- Laval Titan Collège Français defeated Shawinigan Cataractes 4 games to 1.
- Hull Olympiques defeated Beauport Harfangs 4 games to 1.

Finals

- Hull Olympiques defeated Laval Titan Collège Français 4 games to 1.

== All-star teams ==
First team

- Goaltender - Eric Fichaud, Chicoutimi Saguenéens
- Left defence - Charles Paquette, Sherbrooke Faucons
- Right defence - Stephane Julien, Sherbrooke Faucons
- Left winger - Patrick Carignan, Shawinigan Cataractes
- Centreman - Sebastien Bordeleau, Hull Olympiques
- Right winger - Eric Daze, Beauport Harfangs
- Coach - Michel Therrien, Laval Titan Collège Français

Second team

- Goaltender - Jose Theodore, Saint-Jean Lynx / Hull Olympiques
- Left defence - Alain Nasreddine, Chicoutimi Saguenéens
- Right defence - Christian Laflamme, Beauport Harfangs
- Left winger - Brant Blackned, Halifax Mooseheads
- Centreman - Steve Brûlé, Saint-Jean Lynx
- Right winger - Frederic Chartier, Laval Titan Collège Français
- Coach - Claude Therien, Saint-Jean Lynx

Rookie team

- Goaltender - Martin Biron, Beauport Harfangs
- Left defence - Anders Myrvold, Laval Titan Collège Français
- Right defence - Radoslav Suchy, Sherbrooke Faucons
- Left winger - Denis Hamel, Chicoutimi Saguenéens
- Centreman - Danny Briere, Drummondville Voltigeurs
- Right winger - Daniel Corso, Victoriaville Tigres
- Coach - Robert Mongrain, Hull Olympiques
- List of First/Second/Rookie team all-stars.

== Trophies and awards ==
Team

- President's Cup - Playoff Champions, Hull Olympiques
- Jean Rougeau Trophy - Regular Season Champions, Laval Titan Collège Français
- Robert Lebel Trophy - Team with best GAA, Beauport Harfangs

Player

- Michel Brière Memorial Trophy - Most Valuable Player, Frederic Chartier, Laval Titan Collège Français
- Jean Béliveau Trophy - Top Scorer, Patrick Carignan, Shawinigan Cataractes
- Guy Lafleur Trophy - Playoff MVP, Jose Theodore, Hull Olympiques
- Ford Cup – Offensive - Offensive Player of the Year, Sebastien Bordeleau, Hull Olympiques
- Ford Cup – Defensive - Defensive Player of the Year, Jose Theodore, Hull Olympiques
- AutoPro Plaque - Best plus/minus total, Frederic Chartier, Laval Titan Collège Français
- Jacques Plante Memorial Trophy - Best GAA, Martin Biron, Beauport Harfangs
- Emile Bouchard Trophy - Defenceman of the Year, Stephane Julien, Sherbrooke Faucons
- Mike Bossy Trophy - Best Pro Prospect, Martin Biron, Beauport Harfangs
- New Faces Cup - Rookie of the Year, Steve Brûlé, Saint-Jean Lynx
- Michel Bergeron Trophy - Offensive Rookie of the Year, Danny Briere, Drummondville Voltigeurs
- Raymond Lagacé Trophy - Defensive Rookie of the Year, Martin Biron, Beauport Harfangs
- Frank J. Selke Memorial Trophy - Most sportsmanlike player, Eric Daze, Beauport Harfangs
- QMJHL Humanitarian of the Year - Humanitarian of the Year, David-Alexandre Beauregard, Saint-Hyacinthe Laser
- Marcel Robert Trophy - Best Scholastic Player, Danny Briere, Drummondville Voltigeurs
- Paul Dumont Trophy - Personality of the Year, Eric Daze, Beauport Harfangs

Executive

- Ron Lapointe Trophy - Coach of the Year, Michel Therrien, Laval Titan Collège Français
- John Horman Trophy - Executive of the Year, Jean Nadeau, Shawinigan Cataractes
- St-Clair Group Plaque - Marketing Director of the Year, Yvon Rioux, Val D'Or Foreurs

== See also ==
- 1995 Memorial Cup
- 1995 NHL entry draft
- 1994–95 OHL season
- 1994–95 WHL season

Preceded by 1993–94 QMJHL season	QMJHL seasons	Succeeded by 1995–96 QMJHL season
