= 1994 Air Canada Cup =

Tournament details
- Venue: Keystone Centre in Brandon, MB
- Dates: April 18 – 24, 1994
- Teams: 6

Final positions
- Champions: Regina Pat Canadians
- Runners-up: Red Deer Chiefs
- Third place: Intrépide de Gatineau

Tournament statistics
- Scoring leader: Daniel Brière

Awards
- MVP: Tyler Barabonoff

The 1994 Air Canada Cup was Canada's 16th annual national midget 'AAA' hockey championship, which was played April 18 – 24, 1994 at the Keystone Centre in Brandon, Manitoba. The Regina Pat Canadians defeated the Red Deer Chiefs in double overtime of the gold medal game to win the national title. The Intrépide de Gatineau won the bronze medal game. Daniel Brière of Gatineau led the tournament in scoring, while Chris Mason of Red Deer was named Top Goaltender.

== Teams ==
Result	Team	Region	City
1st place, gold medalist(s)	Regina Pat Canadians	West	Regina, SK
2nd place, silver medalist(s)	Red Deer Chiefs	Pacific	Red Deer, AB
3rd place, bronze medalist(s)	Intrépide de Gatineau	Quebec	Gatineau, QC
4	Sudbury Nickel Capitals	Central	Sudbury, ON
5	Halifax McDonald's	Atlantic	Halifax, NS
6	Brandon Wheat Kings	Host	Brandon, MB

== Round robin ==
=== Standings ===
Pos	Team	Pld	W	L	D	GF	GA	GD	Pts
1	Red Deer Chiefs	5	4	1	0	21	16	+5	8
2	Intrépide de Gatineau	5	3	2	0	27	18	+9	6
3	Regina Pat Canadians	5	3	2	0	17	14	+3	6
4	Sudbury Nickel Capitals	5	2	3	0	18	20	−2	4
5	Halifax McDonald's	5	2	3	0	24	25	−1	4
6	Brandon Wheat Kings	5	0	5	0	11	25	−14	0

=== Scores ===
- Sudbury 5 - Brandon 2
- Regina 3 - Gatineau 2
- Red Deer 6 - Halifax 5
- Gatineau 5 - Brandon 3
- Sudbury 5 - Halifax 4
- Regina 5 - Brandon 1
- Red Deer 4 - Sudbury 1
- Halifax 7 - Gatineau 6
- Sudbury 4 - Regina 3
- Red Deer 5 - Brandon 1
- Regina 4 - Halifax 3
- Gatineau 7 - Sudbury 3
- Red Deer 4 - Regina 2
- Halifax 5 - Brandon 4
- Gatineau 7 - Red Deer 2

== Playoffs ==
=== Semi-finals ===
- Red Deer 5 - Sudbury 1
- Regina 3 - Gatineau 1

=== Bronze-medal game ===
- Gatineau 5 - Sudbury 1

=== Gold-medal game ===
- Regina 3 - Red Deer 2 2OT

== Individual awards ==
- Most Valuable Player: Tyler Barabonoff (Red Deer)
- Top Scorer: Daniel Brière (Gatineau)
- Top Forward: Daniel Brière (Gatineau)
- Top Defenceman: Tyler Barabonoff (Red Deer)
- Top Goaltender: Chris Mason (Red Deer)
- Most Sportsmanlike Player: Joel Irving (Regina)

== See also ==
- Telus Cup
