= Patrick Carignan =

Canadian ice hockey left winger

- Born: October 11, 1974 (age 50); Shawinigan, Quebec, Canada
- Height: 5 ft 11 in (180 cm)
- Weight: 207 lb (94 kg; 14 st 11 lb)
- Position: Left wing
- Shot: Left
- Played for: Heilbronner EC; Anglet Hormadi Élite; Diables Rouges de Briançon; Boxers de Bordeaux
- Playing career: 1977–1983

Patrick Carignan (born October 11, 1974) is a Canadian former professional ice hockey left winger.

Carignan played junior hockey in the Quebec Major Junior Hockey League for the Saint-Jean Lynx and Shawinigan Cataractes from 1991 to 1995. In the 1994–95, Carignan won the Jean Béliveau Trophy after scoring 137 points, including 100 assists, in 71 games. He was also named in the QMJHL's First All-Star Team and the CHL Third All-Star Team.

Carignan went on to play professionally in Europe, playing in Germany for Heilbronner EC of the 2nd Bundesliga and in France for Anglet Hormadi Élite and Diables Rouges de Briançon of the FFHG Division 1 and Boxers de Bordeaux of the Élite Ligue.

== Awards and honours ==
| Award | Year |
|---|---|
| QMJHL First All-Star Team | 1994–95 |
| Jean Béliveau Trophy | 1994–95 |

== Career statistics ==
| | | | Regular season | | | | | Playoffs |
| Season | Team | League | GP | G | A | Pts | PIM | GP | G | A | Pts | PIM |
|---|---|---|---|---|---|---|---|---|---|---|---|---|
| 1990–91 | Cantons de L'Est Cantonniers | QMAAA | 40 | 31 | 37 | 68 | 40 | 8 | 2 | 6 | 8 | 2 |
| 1991–92 | Saint-Jean Lynx | QMJHL | 67 | 27 | 44 | 71 | 51 | — | — | — | — | — |
| 1992–93 | Saint-Jean Lynx | QMJHL | 65 | 36 | 59 | 95 | 46 | 4 | 1 | 1 | 2 | 4 |
| 1993–94 | Shawinigan Cataractes | QMJHL | 70 | 31 | 82 | 113 | 42 | 5 | 4 | 8 | 12 | 2 |
| 1994–95 | Shawinigan Cataractes | QMJHL | 71 | 37 | 100 | 137 | 43 | 15 | 8 | 20 | 28 | 6 |
| 1995–96 | Heilbronner EC | DEU.2 | 7 | 3 | 9 | 12 | 0 | — | — | — | — | — |
| 1995–96 | Anglet Hockeyeurs des Sables | FRA.2 | 18 | 16 | 17 | 33 | 12 | — | — | — | — | — |
| 1995–96 | Diables Rouges de Briançon | FRA.2 | 28 | 24 | 36 | 60 | 38 | — | — | — | — | — |
| 1997–98 | Dogues de Bordeaux | FRA | 33 | 13 | 9 | 22 | 22 | — | — | — | — | — |
| 1998–99 | Asbestos Aztèques | QSPHL | 18 | 5 | 12 | 17 | 8 | — | — | — | — | — |
| QMJHL totals | | | 273 | 131 | 285 | 416 | 182 | 24 | 13 | 29 | 42 | 12 |
| FRA.2 totals | | | 46 | 40 | 53 | 93 | 50 | — | — | — | — | — |
