= Steve Regier =

Canadian ice hockey player

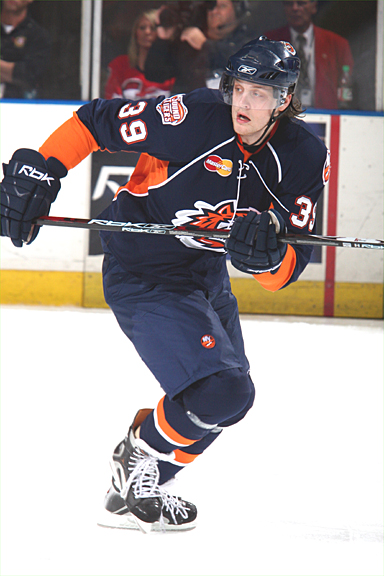
- Regier with the Bridgeport Sound Tigers
- Born: August 31, 1984 (age 41) Edmonton, Alberta, Canada
- Height: 6 ft 4 in (193 cm)
- Weight: 194 lb (88 kg; 13 st 12 lb)
- Position: Left wing
- Shot: Left
- Played for: New York Islanders; St. Louis Blues; EC Red Bull Salzburg; Thomas Sabo Ice Tigers
- NHL draft: 148th overall, 2004; New York Islanders
- Playing career: 2004–2014

Steven Regier (born August 31, 1984) is a Canadian former professional hockey forward. He last played with the Thomas Sabo Ice Tigers of the Deutsche Eishockey Liga (DEL).

== Playing career ==
Regier was born in Edmonton, Alberta. He was drafted by the New York Islanders in the 5th round, 148th overall from the Medicine Hat Tigers of the WHL. Regier made his pro debut with the Bridgeport Sound Tigers in the 2004–05 season and made his NHL debut with the Islanders on the 2005–06 season.

On July 15, 2008, Regier was signed by the St. Louis Blues as an unrestricted free agent. On November 16, 2008, Regier was called up to join the Blues. He scored his first two NHL goals in his first game as a St. Louis Blue that evening, scoring the Blues' only goals against the Montreal Canadiens in a 3-2 shootout loss.

After four seasons with the EC Red Bull Salzburg organization in the Austrian EBEL, Regier left as a free agent and signed a one-year contract to remain in Europe with the Thomas Sabo Ice Tigers of the German DEL on May 2, 2013.

== Career statistics ==
			Regular season					Playoffs
Season	Team	League	GP	G	A	Pts	PIM	GP	G	A	Pts	PIM
2000–01	Leduc Oil Kings AAA	AMHL	35	22	39	61	135	—	—	—	—	—
2000–01	Medicine Hat Tigers	WHL	1	0	0	0	0	—	—	—	—	—
2001–02	Medicine Hat Tigers	WHL	59	1	4	5	31	—	—	—	—	—
2002–03	Medicine Hat Tigers	WHL	61	11	10	21	114	11	2	2	4	20
2003–04	Medicine Hat Tigers	WHL	72	25	35	60	111	18	5	11	16	20
2004–05	Bridgeport Sound Tigers	AHL	75	7	15	22	43	—	—	—	—	—
2005–06	Bridgeport Sound Tigers	AHL	73	16	22	38	54	7	0	2	2	6
2005–06	New York Islanders	NHL	9	0	0	0	0	—	—	—	—	—
2006–07	Bridgeport Sound Tigers	AHL	77	19	27	46	77	—	—	—	—	—
2006–07	New York Islanders	NHL	1	0	0	0	0	—	—	—	—	—
2007–08	Bridgeport Sound Tigers	AHL	65	19	25	44	60	—	—	—	—	—
2007–08	New York Islanders	NHL	8	0	0	0	4	—	—	—	—	—
2008–09	Peoria Rivermen	AHL	73	22	28	50	61	7	2	2	4	4
2008–09	St. Louis Blues	NHL	8	3	1	4	4	—	—	—	—	—
2009–10	EC Red Bull Salzburg	AUT	38	10	21	31	63	18	0	6	6	22
2010–11	EC Red Bull Salzburg	AUT	50	11	22	33	16	18	4	8	12	8
2011–12	EC Red Bull Salzburg	AUT	30	7	17	24	16	6	0	0	0	4
2012–13	EC Red Bull Salzburg	AUT	50	11	20	31	20	12	2	6	8	2
2013–14	Thomas Sabo Ice Tigers	DEL	36	6	11	17	12	4	0	3	3	2
AHL totals			363	83	117	200	295	14	2	4	6	10
NHL totals			26	3	1	4	8	—	—	—	—	—
AUT totals			168	39	80	119	115	54	6	20	26	36
