= Martin Biron =

Canadian ice hockey player (born 1977)

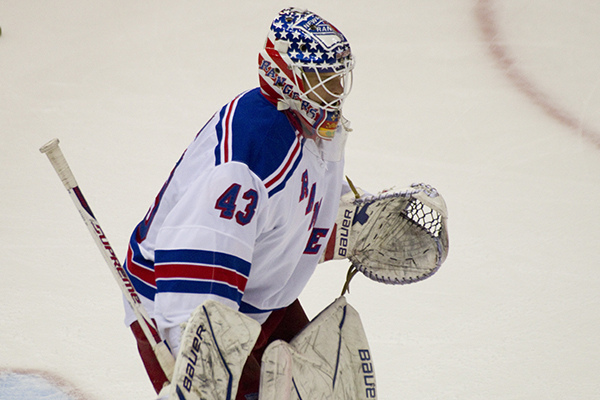
- Biron with the New York Rangers in 2010
- Born: August 15, 1977 (age 49) Lac-Saint-Charles, Quebec, Canada
- Height: 6 ft 2 in (188 cm)
- Weight: 170 lb (77 kg; 12 st 2 lb)
- Position: Goaltender
- Caught: Left
- Played for: Buffalo Sabres; Philadelphia Flyers; New York Islanders; New York Rangers
- National team: Canada
- NHL draft: 16th overall, 1995; Buffalo Sabres
- Playing career: 1995–2013

Martin Gaston Biron (/ˈbɪərɒn/; born August 15, 1977) is a Canadian former professional ice hockey goaltender.

Drafted by the Buffalo Sabres in the first round (16th overall) of the 1995 NHL entry draft, he spent the first half of his 16-year National Hockey League (NHL) career with the Sabres, later having stints with the Philadelphia Flyers, New York Islanders, and New York Rangers. He is currently a television analyst with the Sabres on MSG Western New York.

His younger brother Mathieu played 250 games in the NHL as a defenceman.

== Playing career ==
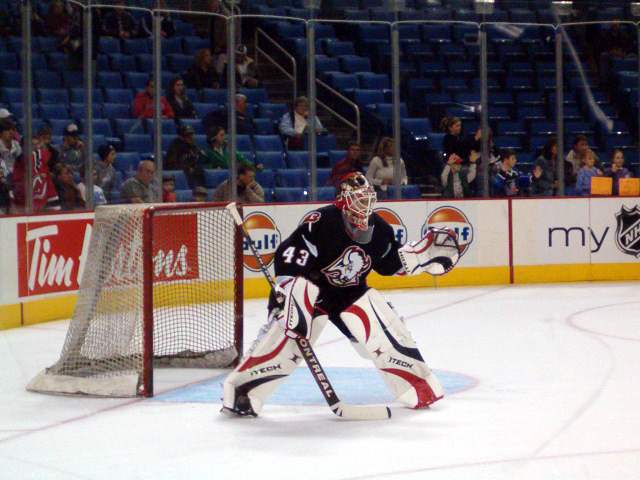
Martin Biron in goal for Buffalo during the 2005–06 season

As a youth, Biron played in the 1991 Quebec International Pee-Wee Hockey Tournament with a minor ice hockey team from Charlesbourg, Quebec City.

Biron started his junior ice hockey career on the Beauport Harfangs of the Quebec Major Junior Hockey League (QMJHL). He made his NHL debut with the Buffalo Sabres on December 26, 1995. An emergency call-up with the Sabres' top three goaltenders all injured, Biron became the fourth-youngest goaltender to start a game in NHL history, surrendering four first-period goals in a 6–3 loss to the Pittsburgh Penguins. After posting a 5.04 goals against average (GAA) with no wins and two losses during his fill-in stint, he was sent back to the QMJHL to develop further. After the 2000–01 season, he was a consistent goaltender for the Sabres as his play in the crease improved drastically.

Biron, along with Rob Ray and Dominik Hašek, was one of the three Sabres against whom, in three consecutive years, the NHL made a specific rule. After NHL statisticians discovered a bug in their new stat-tracking software, the "Biron rule" restricted jersey numbers to whole numbers between 1 and 99 (later limited to numbers between 1 and 98 after the league-wide retirement of number 99 for Wayne Gretzky). Biron was the only NHL player affected, as only he wore "00" at the time. (Goaltender John Davidson also wore 00 during his playing career, without rebuke, at various points between 1973 and 1983.) Upon his return to the NHL three seasons later, Biron switched to number 43, and wore that number until the end of his career.

Biron became the Sabres' starting goaltender after Hašek's departure from Buffalo in 2001 and held the position until the 2004–05 NHL lockout. Biron has always been a fan favorite in Buffalo and although he no longer plays there, he currently resides in the city and after his retirement has a position as director of goaltending at HarborCenter, which is owned and operated by the Sabres organization.

Biron won his 13th consecutive game on December 17, 2005, against the Pittsburgh Penguins. He was the first goalie with 13 straight wins since Chris Osgood accomplished the feat during the 1995–1996 season.

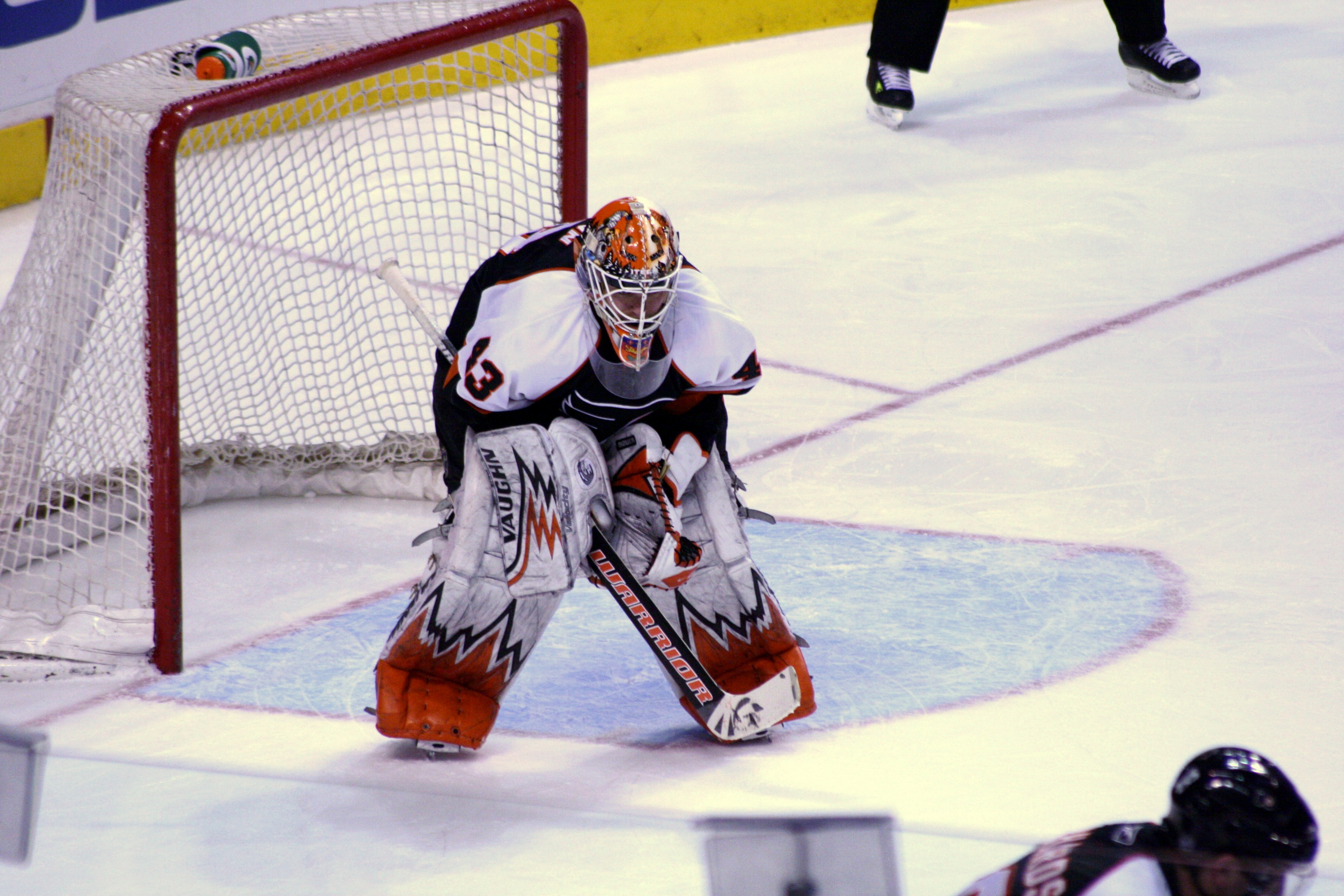
Biron with the Flyers during the 2008–09 NHL season.

After losing the number one goaltending job to emerging youngster Ryan Miller, Biron requested a trade from the Sabres on June 26, 2006, in an effort to receive more playing time. Finally, on February 27, 2007, the Sabres traded Biron to the Philadelphia Flyers for a second-round draft pick.

On March 27, 2007, Biron signed a two-year, $7 million contract extension with the Flyers to be the starting goaltender in Philadelphia. After appearing in 62 games and recording 30 wins in the 2007–08 season, he led the Flyers to the Eastern Conference Finals, losing in five games to the Eastern Conference champion Pittsburgh Penguins. He appeared in 55 games for the Flyers in the 2008–09 season, winning 29 and helping the Flyers to the fifth-overall seed in the Eastern Conference.

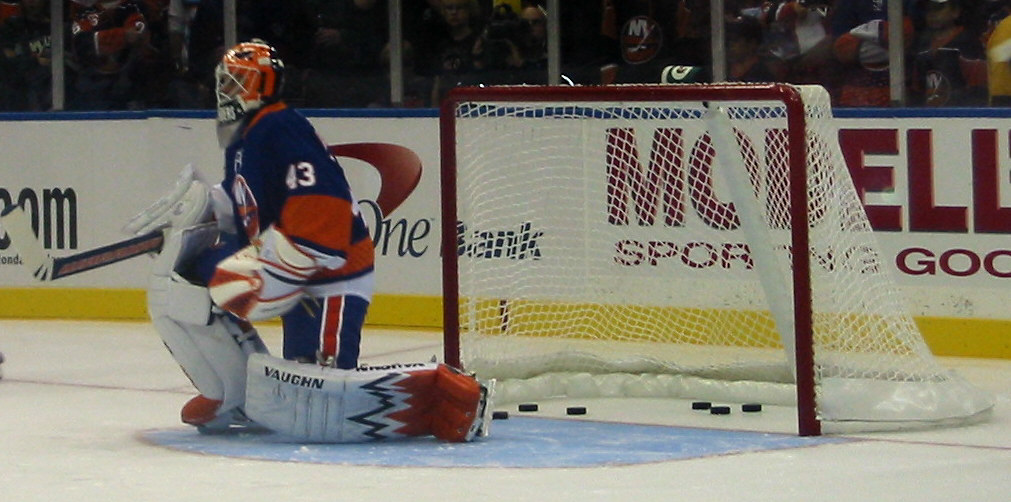
Biron with the Islanders

On July 1, 2009, Biron entered free agency. He was soon left in a difficult position after the Flyers signed goaltenders Ray Emery and Brian Boucher, while other teams quickly filled up their goaltending roster needs. Biron soon signed a one-year, $1.4 million contract with the New York Islanders on July 22, 2009, joining goaltenders Dwayne Roloson and Rick DiPietro. In 29 appearances, Biron recorded nine wins, 14 losses and four overtime losses, with a 3.27 goals against average and .896 save percentage. The Islanders did not qualify for the post-season.

On July 1, 2010, Biron signed a two-year, $1.75 million deal with the New York Rangers, where he prepared to back-up Swedish starter Henrik Lundqvist. Biron is one of six players in NHL history to skate for all three teams based in the state of New York. The others were Mike Donnelly, and former teammates Taylor Pyatt, Chad Johnson, Jason Dawe and Pat LaFontaine. Except for a 2 1/2-year stint with the Philadelphia Flyers, Biron played almost his entire career in the state of New York. On February 28, 2011, Biron fractured his collarbone during practice and was forced to miss the remainder of the 2010–11 season. While he played in the lowest number of games (17) since his second NHL season in 1998–99, he posted career highs in save percentage (.923) and goals against average (2.13). On June 29, 2012, Biron re-signed with the Rangers in a one-way contract worth $2.6 million over two years, working out to an average of $1.3 million per year.

On October 14, 2013, the Rangers placed Biron on waivers after a poor start to the season, and the following day, he was assigned to play with the Hartford Wolf Pack of the American Hockey League (AHL). Biron announced his retirement via social media on October 20, 2013, choosing retirement over playing in the minor leagues. He ended his career with a 230–191–25–27 record, 2.62 goals against average and a .910 save percentage.

== Post-playing career ==
He currently works as a studio analyst with the Sabres and the Sabres Hockey Network on MSG Western New York. Previously, he was an analyst on the TSN panel along with James Duthie, Aaron Ward and Bob McKenzie, worked on NHL Network, and did studio work for the New York Islanders. He is also the director of goaltending at the Academy of Hockey at the Buffalo HarborCenter. Biron also stars on the popular Buffalo sports podcast, "Sabres Live", with Brian Duff.

On February 21, 2017, Biron received United States citizenship. He sought U.S. citizenship because he had married an American citizen and has resided with her and their four children in Buffalo for several years; but as he was not a U.S. citizen, he could not vote in American elections.

Biron was inducted into the Rochester Americans Hall of Fame on February 16, 2018.

== Family ==
Martin's son, Jacob, followed in his father's footsteps and became a goaltender. After playing junior hockey in Buffalo and Kemptville, he joined the program at Army for the fall of 2024.

== Awards ==
- QMJHL All-Rookie Team (1995)
- Canadian Major Junior First All-Star Team (1995)
- Canadian Major Junior Goaltender of the Year (1995)
- AHL First All-Star Team (1999)
- Harry "Hap" Holmes Memorial Award (fewest goals against - AHL) (1999) (shared with Tom Draper)
- Aldege "Baz" Bastien Memorial Award (Outstanding Goaltender - AHL) (1999)
- Robert W. Clarke Trophy with the Rochester Americans (1999)

== Career statistics ==
=== Regular season and playoffs ===
			Regular season										Playoffs
Season	Team	League	GP	W	L	T	OTL	MIN	GA	SO	GAA	SV%	GP	W	L	MIN	GA	SO	GAA	SV%
1993–94	Abitibi-Témiscamingue	QMAAA	23	14	8	1	—	1,412	80	1	3.40	—	2	1	1	112	7	0	3.73	—
1994–95	Beauport Harfangs	QMJHL	56	29	16	9	—	3,193	132	3	2.48	.898	16	8	7	903	37	4	2.46	.904
1995–96	Beauport Harfangs	QMJHL	55	29	17	7	—	3,207	150	1	2.84	.897	19	12	7	1,135	64	0	3.38	.888
1995–96	Buffalo Sabres	NHL	3	0	2	0	—	119	10	0	5.04	.844	—	—	—	—	—	—	—	—
1996–97	Beauport Harfangs	QMJHL	18	6	10	1	—	935	62	1	3.98	.895	—	—	—	—	—	—	—	—
1996–97	Hull Olympiques	QMJHL	16	11	4	1	—	972	43	2	2.65	.915	6	3	1	326	19	0	3.50	.871
1997–98	South Carolina Stingrays	ECHL	2	0	1	1	—	86	3	0	2.09	.929	—	—	—	—	—	—	—	—
1997–98	Rochester Americans	AHL	41	14	18	6	—	2,312	113	5	2.93	.907	4	1	3	239	16	0	4.02	.885
1998–99	Buffalo Sabres	NHL	6	1	2	1	—	281	10	0	2.14	.917	—	—	—	—	—	—	—	—
1998–99	Rochester Americans	AHL	52	36	13	3	—	3,129	108	6	2.07	.930	20	12	8	1,167	42	1	2.16	.934
1999–00	Rochester Americans	AHL	6	6	0	0	—	344	12	1	2.09	.924	—	—	—	—	—	—	—	—
1999–00	Buffalo Sabres	NHL	41	19	18	2	—	2,229	90	5	2.42	.909	—	—	—	—	—	—	—	—
2000–01	Rochester Americans	AHL	4	3	1	0	—	239	4	1	1.00	.955	—	—	—	—	—	—	—	—
2000–01	Buffalo Sabres	NHL	18	7	7	1	—	918	39	2	2.55	.909	—	—	—	—	—	—	—	—
2001–02	Buffalo Sabres	NHL	72	31	28	10	—	4,085	151	4	2.22	.915	—	—	—	—	—	—	—	—
2002–03	Buffalo Sabres	NHL	54	17	28	6	—	3,170	135	4	2.56	.908	—	—	—	—	—	—	—	—
2003–04	Buffalo Sabres	NHL	52	26	18	5	—	2,972	125	2	2.52	.913	—	—	—	—	—	—	—	—
2005–06	Buffalo Sabres	NHL	35	21	8	—	3	1,934	93	1	2.88	.905	—	—	—	—	—	—	—	—
2006–07	Buffalo Sabres	NHL	19	12	4	—	1	1,066	54	0	3.04	.899	—	—	—	—	—	—	—	—
2006–07	Philadelphia Flyers	NHL	16	6	8	—	2	935	47	0	3.02	.908	—	—	—	—	—	—	—	—
2007–08	Philadelphia Flyers	NHL	62	30	20	—	9	3,539	153	5	2.59	.918	17	9	8	1,049	52	1	2.97	.904
2008–09	Philadelphia Flyers	NHL	55	29	19	—	5	3,177	146	2	2.75	.915	6	2	4	375	16	1	2.56	.919
2009–10	New York Islanders	NHL	29	9	14	—	4	1,634	89	1	3.27	.896	—	—	—	—	—	—	—	—
2009–10	Bridgeport Sound Tigers	AHL	2	1	1	—	0		7	0	3.39	.903	—	—	—	—	—	—	—	—
2010–11	New York Rangers	NHL	17	8	6	—	0	928	33	0	2.13	.923	—	—	—	—	—	—	—	—
2011–12	New York Rangers	NHL	21	12	6	—	2	1,220	50	2	2.46	.904	—	—	—	—	—	—	—	—
2012–13	New York Rangers	NHL	6	2	2	—	1	336	13	0	2.32	.917	—	—	—	—	—	—	—	—
2013–14	New York Rangers	NHL	2	0	1	—	0	71	9	0	7.61	.763	—	—	—	—	—	—	—	—
NHL totals			508	230	191	25	27	28,612	1247	28	2.62	.910	23	11	12	1,424	68	2	2.87	.908

=== International ===
Year	Team	Event	GP	W	L	T	MIN	GA	SO	GAA	SV%
1997	Canada	WJC	1	0	0	0	1	0	0	0.00	—
2003	Canada	WC	Selected, but did not play

== See also ==
- Notable families in the NHL
- List of Buffalo Sabres broadcasters

Awards and achievements
Preceded by Jay McKee	Buffalo Sabres first-round draft pick 1995	Succeeded by Erik Rasmussen
Preceded by Scott Langkow	Aldege "Baz" Bastien Memorial Award; 1998–99	Succeeded by Martin Brochu
