= Chris Mason (ice hockey) =

Canadian ice hockey player (born 1976)

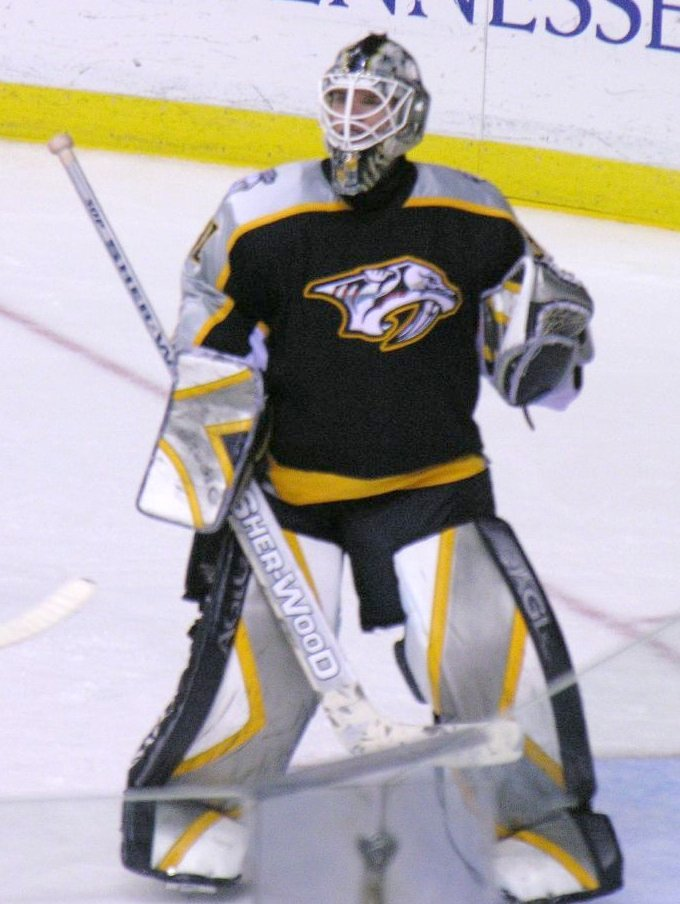
- Mason with the Nashville Predators in 2006
- Born: April 20, 1976 (age 50) Red Deer, Alberta, Canada
- Height: 6 ft 0 in (183 cm)
- Weight: 195 lb (88 kg; 13 st 13 lb)
- Position: Goaltender
- Caught: Left
- Played for: Nashville Predators; Vålerenga Ishockey; St. Louis Blues; Atlanta Thrashers; Winnipeg Jets; Ritten-Renon; Augsburger Panther
- National team: Canada
- NHL draft: 122nd overall, 1995; New Jersey Devils
- Playing career: 1997–2015

Christopher Robert Mason (born April 20, 1976) is a Canadian former professional ice hockey goaltender and current color commentator for the Nashville Predators on Bally Sports South. After being drafted by the New Jersey Devils in the 1995 NHL entry draft, Mason spent 10 years playing for the Nashville Predators, Atlanta Thrashers/Winnipeg Jets, and St. Louis Blues. He left the NHL in 2013 and retired with the Augsburger Panther of the Deutsche Eishockey Liga (DEL).

== Playing career ==
While completing a junior career in the Western Hockey League (WHL) with the Prince George Cougars, Mason was originally drafted 122nd overall in the 1995 NHL entry draft by the New Jersey Devils. Embarking on his professional career and un-signed from the Devils, Mason signed as a free agent by the Mighty Ducks of Anaheim on June 27, 1997. After his rookie professional season with the Ducks' American Hockey League (AHL) affiliate, the Cincinnati Mighty Ducks, and on the eve of his sophomore season, Mason was traded by Anaheim along with Marc Moro to the Nashville Predators in exchange for Dominic Roussel.

Mason made his debut in the NHL with the Predators during the 1998–99 season, relieving in three games. After a further three seasons within the Predators organization, Mason left as a free agent and signed a contract with the Florida Panthers. Mason was assigned to Florida's AHL affiliate, the San Antonio Rampage, for the duration of the 2002–03 season. He re-signed with the Panthers to a one-year extension, however he never featured for the club before he was claimed in the 2003 NHL Waiver Draft to return to the Nashville Predators.

In the 2003–04 season, Mason joined the Predators full-time as the backup to starter Tomáš Vokoun. In 17 appearances that season, Mason finished with a 4–4–1 record with a 2.18 goals against average (GAA) and .926 save percentage.

During the 2004–05 NHL lockout, Mason played for Vålerenga Ishockey in the Norwegian league with fellow Predator Scott Hartnell. Being hailed as the best goalie in the league ever, he played a big part in Vålerenga securing their 25th league championship and their 24th Norwegian Championship by winning the playoffs.

On April 15, 2006, when he was starting because starting goaltender Vokoun was lost for the year with a blood condition, Mason was credited for a goal when Phoenix Coyotes forward Geoff Sanderson shot the puck into his own net. Mason became the ninth NHL goaltender to score a goal and joined Damian Rhodes as the only goalies to be credited with a goal in both the AHL and the NHL.

In the off-season of 2007, Vokoun was traded to the Florida Panthers for a few draft picks, leaving Mason as the starter for Nashville, alone with backup goaltender Dan Ellis. Mason quickly won the first two games, the collective scores of which were 9–1 in favor of the Predators, but then dropped a startling seven straight games. Dan Ellis, however, was able to step up for the Predators and win four straight. Mason returned to play against the Detroit Red Wings in a 43-save loss. The loss was no surprise, but Mason did show that he could effectively remain the Nashville starter, and continued to start for the remainder of his time with the Predators.

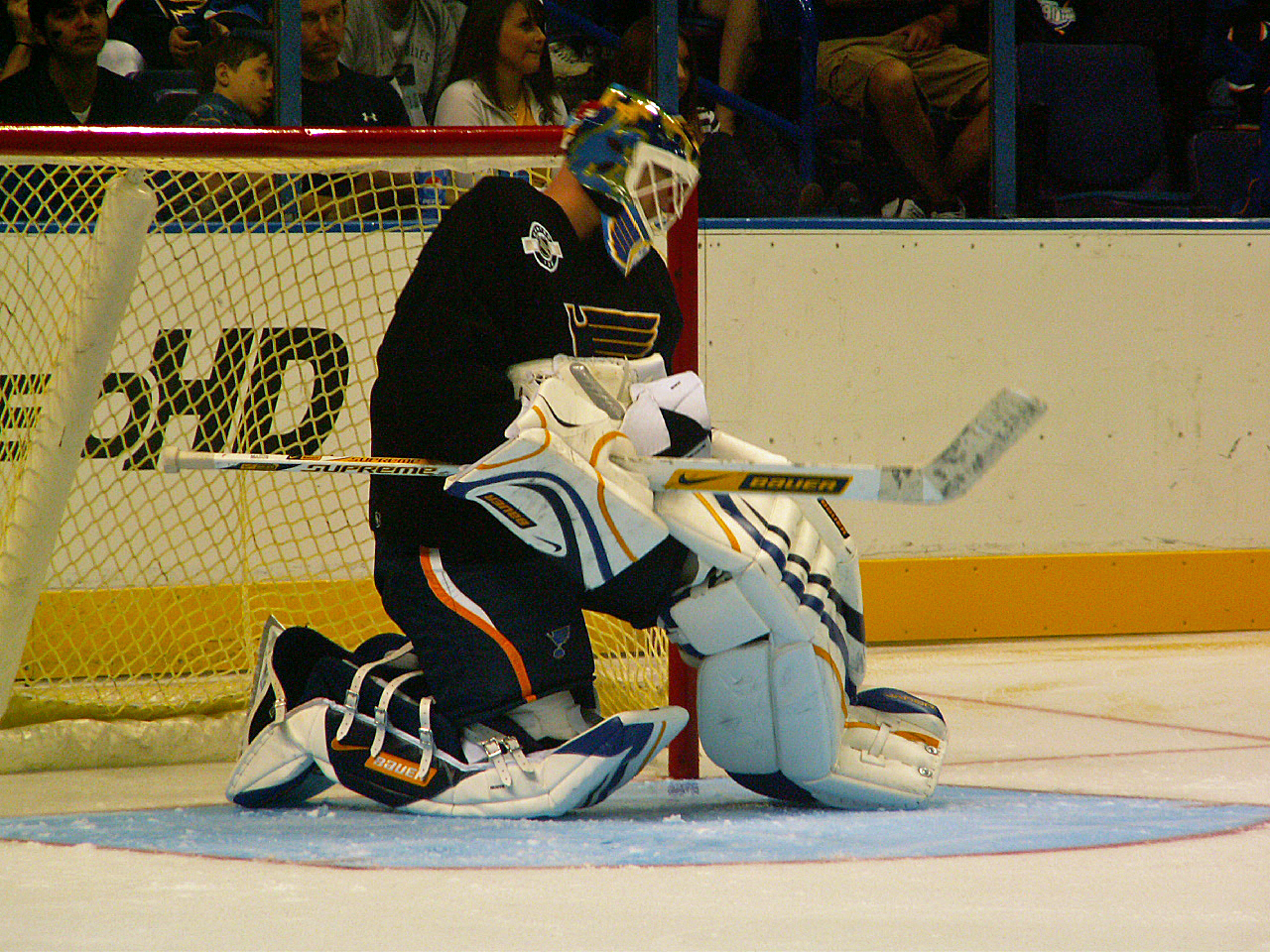
Mason at the 2008 Blues FanFest. Mason was traded to the St. Louis Blues in the 2008 off-season.

On June 20, 2008, Mason was traded by the Predators to the St. Louis Blues for a fourth round draft pick. In two seasons as the Blues number one goalie, Mason appeared in career high 61 and 57 games, to post 27 and 30 wins respectively.

On July 1, 2010, Mason left the Blues and signed a two-year, $3.7 million deal with the Atlanta Thrashers, marking the first time in his NHL career that Mason played for an Eastern Conference team. Mason's 2010–11 campaign was a disappointment, as it marked the first time in his career that he posted a GAA above 3.00. Following the team's relocation, Mason played out the second season of his contract for the Winnipeg Jets.

On July 1, 2012, Mason returned for a third stint with the Nashville Predators, on a one-year deal to serve as the team's backup goalie. During the lockout shortened 2012–13 season, Mason was unable to recapture his earlier career form posting a career low goals against and save percentage.

With limited NHL interest at season's end, Mason signed abroad in Italy to a one-year contract with Ritten-Renon of the Elite.A on August 6, 2013. After a successful season in Italy, on May 23, 2014, he moved to Germany to sign a one-year contract with the Augsburger Panther of the Deutsche Eishockey Liga (DEL).

On September 21, 2015, Mason announced his retirement from professional hockey and that he would be joining the Nashville Predators Radio Network as a colour commentator for select games during the 2015–16 season. Beginning in the 2017-18 season, Mason became the primary TV commentator for Predators games.

== International play ==
Medal record

Representing Canada

World Championships
Gold medal – first place	2007 Russia	
Silver medal – second place	2009 Switzerland	

Mason made his international debut with Canada at the 2006 World Championships but did not play. He won a gold medal with team Canada at the 2007 World Championships as a third goaltender. He played his first game at the 2009 World Championships in Switzerland where he went 4–0 with a 1.00 GAA, and helped Canada to a silver medal.

Based on the strong performance in 2009 World Championships and in the NHL regular season leading up to the Olympics, Mason was selected as a reserve by Team Canada for the 2010 Winter Olympics as a stand-by goaltender should an injury occur. He would play as the starting goaltender at the 2010 World Championships in Germany, where they lost against Team Russia in the quarter-finals. Mason also played for Team Canada at the 2013 Spengler Cup.

== Career statistics ==
=== Regular season and playoffs ===
			Regular season									Playoffs
Season	Team	League	GP	W	L	T/OT	MIN	GA	SO	GAA	SV%	GP	W	L	MIN	GA	SO	GAA	SV%
1993–94	Victoria Cougars	WHL	5	1	4	0	237	27	0	6.84	—	—	—	—	—	—	—	—	—
1994–95	Prince George Cougars	WHL	44	8	30	0	2288	192	1	5.03	—	—	—	—	—	—	—	—	—
1995–96	Prince George Cougars	WHL	59	16	37	0	3289	236	1	4.31	—	—	—	—	—	—	—	—	—
1996–97	Prince George Cougars	WHL	50	19	23	1	2852	172	2	3.62	.900	15	9	6	938	44	1	2.81	—
1997–98	Cincinnati Mighty Ducks	AHL	47	13	19	7	2368	136	0	3.45	.903	—	—	—	—	—	—	—	—
1998–99	Milwaukee Admirals	IHL	34	15	12	6	1901	92	1	2.90	.906	—	—	—	—	—	—	—	—
1998–99	Nashville Predators	NHL	3	0	0	0	69	6	0	5.21	.864	—	—	—	—	—	—	—	—
1999–00	Milwaukee Admirals	IHL	52	20	21	8	2952	137	2	2.78	.904	3	1	2	252	11	0	2.62	.923
2000–01	Milwaukee Admirals	IHL	37	17	14	5	2226	87	5	2.35	.920	4	1	3	239	12	0	3.01	.891
2000–01	Nashville Predators	NHL	1	0	1	0	58	2	0	2.05	.900	—	—	—	—	—	—	—	—
2001–02	Milwaukee Admirals	AHL	48	17	21	7	2755	116	2	2.53	.917	—	—	—	—	—	—	—	—
2002–03	San Antonio Rampage	AHL	50	25	18	6	2914	122	1	2.51	.921	3	0	3	195	9	0	2.77	.926
2003–04	Nashville Predators	NHL	17	4	4	1	743	27	1	2.18	.926	—	—	—	—	—	—	—	—
2003–04	Milwaukee Admirals	AHL	1	1	0	0	60	2	0	2.00	.933	—	—	—	—	—	—	—	—
2004–05	Vålerenga	GET	20	14	5	1	1203	36	1	1.79	.934	11	10	1	657	22	1	2.01	.936
2005–06	Nashville Predators	NHL	23	12	5	1	1226	52	2	2.54	.913	5	1	4	296	17	0	3.45	.901
2006–07	Nashville Predators	NHL	40	24	11	4	2342	93	5	2.38	.925	—	—	—	—	—	—	—	—
2007–08	Nashville Predators	NHL	51	18	22	6	2691	130	4	2.90	.898	—	—	—	—	—	—	—	—
2008–09	St. Louis Blues	NHL	57	27	21	7	3215	129	6	2.41	.916	4	0	4	257	10	0	2.34	.916
2009–10	St. Louis Blues	NHL	61	30	22	8	3512	148	2	2.53	.913	—	—	—	—	—	—	—	—
2010–11	Atlanta Thrashers	NHL	33	13	13	3	1682	95	1	3.39	.892	—	—	—	—	—	—	—	—
2011–12	Winnipeg Jets	NHL	20	8	7	1	995	43	2	2.59	.898	—	—	—	—	—	—	—	—
2012–13	Nashville Predators	NHL	11	1	7	1	467	29	0	3.73	.873	—	—	—	—	—	—	—	—
2013–14	Ritten/Renon	ITL	36	27	8	0	2064	75	1	2.18	.927	17	—	—	1030	—	3	1.86	.951
2014–15	Augsburger Panther	DEL	33	13	18	0	1865	99	0	3.18	.901	—	—	—	—	—	—	—	—
NHL totals			317	137	113	31	17,004	754	23	2.66	.909	9	1	8	553	27	0	2.93	.907

=== International ===
Year	Team	Event	Result	GP	W	L	T	SO	GAA	SV%
2006	Canada	WC	4th	0	—	—	—	—	—	—
2007	Canada	WC	1st place, gold medalist(s)	0	—	—	—	—	—	—
2009	Canada	WC	2nd place, silver medalist(s)	4	4	0	0	1	1.00	.965
2010	Canada	WC	7th	7	3	4	0	0	2.80	.896
Senior int'l totals				11	7	4	0	1	2.06	.925

== Awards ==
- Air Canada Cup Top Goaltender in 1994
- Norwegian GET-ligaen All-Star Team in 2004–05.
- GET-ligaen champion with Vålerenga in 2004–05.
- Norwegian Champion with Vålerenga in 2004–05.
