= Beauport Harfangs =

- City: Beauport, Quebec
- League: QMJHL
- Operated: 1990 to 1997
- Home arena: Aréna Marcel Bédard

Franchise history
- 1990–97: Beauport Harfangs
- 1997–present: Quebec Remparts

The Beauport Harfangs (Snow Owls) were a junior ice hockey team in the Quebec Major Junior Hockey League (QMJHL) from 1990 to 1997. The team played its home games at the Aréna Marcel-Bédard in the Quebec City suburb of Beauport. The team's first coach was Alain Chainey, who had previously been an assistant coach with the National Hockey League (NHL)'s Quebec Nordiques. The Harfangs played for seven seasons before relocating to Quebec City in 1997 to become the second incarnation of the Quebec Remparts.

== Coaches ==
Jos Canale coached the Harfangs for two and a half seasons from 1993 to 1995. Alain Vigneault, who coached the Harfangs in the team's final two seasons, guided them to the QMJHL finals in 1995-96. Vigneault has since gone on to serve as a head coach in the NHL. Jocelyn "Joe" Hardy, who coached the Harfangs during part of the 1992–93 season, also played briefly in the NHL, and was a local sportsman.

== NHL alumni ==
Nineteen players graduated to play in the NHL.

- Matthew Barnaby
- Éric Bélanger
- Martin Biron
- Marc Chouinard
- Patrick Côté
- Marcel Cousineau
- Éric Dazé
- Gordie Dwyer
- Simon Gagné
- Jean-Luc Grand-Pierre
- Christian Laflamme
- Jean-Yves Leroux
- Don MacLean
- Marquis Mathieu
- André Roy
- Gaétan Royer
- Yannick Tremblay
- Jean-Guy Trudel
- Derrick Walser
