= 2010 Memorial Cup =

Canadian junior men's ice hockey championship

2010 Mastercard Memorial Cup

Tournament details
- Venue(s): Westman Place; Brandon, Manitoba
- Dates: May 14–23, 2010
- Teams: 4
- Host team: Brandon Wheat Kings (WHL)
- TV partner(s): Rogers Sportsnet; NHL Network (United States)

Final positions
- Champions: Windsor Spitfires (OHL) (2nd title)
- Runners-up: Brandon Wheat Kings (WHL)

Tournament statistics
- Games played: 8
- Attendance: 42,204 (5,276 per game)
- Scoring leader: Taylor Hall (Spitfires) (9 points)

Awards
- MVP: Taylor Hall (Spitfires)

The Memorial Cup trophy

The 2010 Memorial Cup was a four-team round-robin format tournament played during May 14–23, 2010 in Brandon, Manitoba. It was the 92nd annual Memorial Cup competition and determined the major junior ice hockey champion of the Canadian Hockey League (CHL). The Western Hockey League (WHL) announced on October 15, 2008, that the Brandon Wheat Kings were chosen to host the event at the Keystone Centre. Other tournament participants included the Windsor Spitfires, champions of the OHL, the Moncton Wildcats, champions of the QMJHL and the Calgary Hitmen, champions of the WHL. The Spitfires went 4–0 in the tournament, defeating Brandon 9–1 in the championship to claim their second straight Memorial Cup title.

== Potential hosts ==
The Brandon Wheat Kings, Everett Silvertips and Kelowna Rockets submitted applications to host the 2010 MasterCard Memorial Cup. Bid presentations took place on October 15, 2008, in Calgary, Alberta. The decision to award the hosting of the 2010 MasterCard Memorial Cup to Brandon was made by a majority vote of the WHL Board of Governors.

We are delighted to bring one of the most prestigious Canadian hockey championships – The MasterCard Memorial Cup – to the city of Brandon and the Province of Manitoba for the first time. The Brandon Wheat Kings are one of the longest standing franchises in WHL history and this community has earned the right to host our national showcase.

— Ron Robison, WHL Commissioner

Just prior to the August application deadline, both the province of Manitoba and City of Brandon brought forth a combined $5,000,000 (CAD) in improvements to the Keystone Centre, in an effort to boost the Wheat Kings' chances at becoming host.

== Round-robin standings ==
Pos	Team	Pld	W	L	GF	GA	GD	
1	Windsor Spitfires (OHL)	3	3	0	19	8	+11	Advanced directly to the championship game
2	Calgary Hitmen (WHL)	3	2	1	12	11	+1	Advanced to the semifinal game
3	Brandon Wheat Kings (Host/WHL)	3	1	2	8	14	−6	Advanced to the semifinal game
4	Moncton Wildcats (QMJHL)	3	0	3	7	13	−6	

== Schedule ==
All times local (UTC −6)

=== Round robin ===
May 14	Windsor Spitfires	9–3	Brandon Wheat Kings	Westman Place, Brandon	Recap
Kenny Ryan (1) – 02:01; Scott Timmins (1) – 03:25; Adam Henrique (1) – 04:27; Taylor Hall (1) – 04:45; Taylor Hall (2) – pp – 18:23		First period	No scoring
Adam Henrique (2) – 01:15; Scott Timmins (2) – 06:47; Dale Mitchell (1) – 14:49; Zack Kassian (1) – pp – 16:21		Second period	14:57 – Aaron Lewadniuk (1)
No scoring		Third period	00:35 – Matt Calvert (1); 13:28 – Jay Fehr (1)
Philipp Grubauer (30 saves / 33 shots)		Goalie stats	Andrew Hayes (18 saves / 23 shots); Jacob DeSerres (16 saves / 20 shots)

May 15	Calgary Hitmen	5–4	Moncton Wildcats	Westman Place, Brandon	Recap
No scoring		First period	09:53 – Devon MacAusland (1)
Tyler Fiddler (1) – 18:52		Second period	07:42 – David Savard (1); 14:11 – Alex Saulnier (1)
Joel Broda (1) – 03:08; Giffen Nyren (1) – pp – 14:15; Kris Foucault (1) – 16:29; Tyler Shattock (1) – 18:42		Third period	08:48 – pp – Alex Saulnier (2)
Martin Jones (34 saves / 38 shots)		Goalie stats	Nicola Riopel (22 saves / 27 shots)

May 16	Brandon Wheat Kings	4–0	Moncton Wildcats	Westman Place, Brandon	Recap
Toni Rajala (1) – 10:14		First period	No scoring
Toni Rajala (2) – 08:17; Brayden Schenn (1) – pp – 12:19		Second period	No scoring
Brent Raedeke (1) – 02:24		Third period	No scoring
Jacob DeSerres (31 saves / 31 shots)		Goalie stats	Nicola Riopel (34 saves / 38 shots)

May 17	Calgary Hitmen	2–6	Windsor Spitfires	Westman Place, Brandon	Recap
No scoring		First period	02:38 – Dale Mitchell (2); 03:55 – pp – Taylor Hall (3)
Jimmy Bubnick (1) – 11:43; Jimmy Bubnick (2) – 14:56		Second period	08:15 – Justin Shugg (1)
No scoring		Third period	00:12 – Taylor Hall (4); 16:56 – Kenny Ryan (2); 19:19 – en – Adam Wallace (1)
Martin Jones (31 saves / 36 shots)		Goalie stats	Philipp Grubauer (25 saves / 27 shots)

May 18	Moncton Wildcats	3–4	OT	Windsor Spitfires	Westman Place, Brandon	Recap
Randy Cameron (1) – pp – 18:36		First period		19:52 – pp – Cam Fowler (1)
No scoring		Second period		05:09 – Justin Shugg (2)
Scott Brannon (1) – 02:32; Brandon Gormley (1) – 03:01		Third period		04:47 – Stephen Johnston (1)
No scoring		First overtime period		12:22 – Eric Wellwood (1)
Shane Owen (48 saves / 52 shots)		Goalie stats		Philipp Grubauer (38 saves / 41 shots)

May 19	Brandon Wheat Kings	1–5	Calgary Hitmen	Westman Place, Brandon	Recap
Jay Fehr (2) – 03:44		First period	03:15 – Kris Foucault (2); 06:36 – Kris Foucault (3); 13:47 – Cody Beach (1); 14:54 – Jimmy Bubnick (3); 16:50 – Tyler Shattock (2)
No scoring		Second period	No scoring
No scoring		Third period	No scoring
Jacob DeSerres (25 saves / 30 shots)		Goalie stats	Martin Jones (39 saves / 40 shots)

=== Semi-final ===
May 21	Brandon Wheat Kings	5–4	OT	Calgary Hitmen	Westman Place, Brandon	Recap
No scoring		First period		15:34 – Joel Broda (2); 15:43 – Ian Schultz (1)
Alexander Urbom (1) – 01:35; Matt Calvert (2) – 11:58; Travis Hamonic (1) – pp – 19:49		Second period		09:43 – sh – Tyler Fiddler (2)
Colby Robak (1) – pp – 05:09		Third period		14:48 – Mikhail Fisenko (1)
Jay Fehr (3) – 03:16		First overtime period		No scoring
Jacob DeSerres (25 saves / 29 shots)		Goalie stats		Martin Jones (43 saves / 48 shots)

=== Final ===
May 23	Brandon Wheat Kings	1–9	Windsor Spitfires	Westman Place, Brandon	Recap
No scoring		First period	06:34 – Adam Henrique (3); 19:27 – Eric Wellwood (2)
Matt Calvert (3) – pp – 08:16		Second period	04:34 – pp – Taylor Hall (5); 08:56 – Greg Nemisz (1); 11:36 – Marc Cantin (1); 16:52 – Cam Fowler (2)
No scoring		Third period	05:42 – Zack Kassian (2); 09:44 – Adam Henrique (4); 15:40 – Dale Mitchell (3)
Jacob DeSerres (43 saves / 52 shots)		Goalie stats	Philipp Grubauer (27 saves / 28 shots)

== Statistical leaders ==
=== Skaters ===
Player	Team	GP	G	A	Pts	PIM
Taylor Hall	Windsor Spitfires	4	5	4	9	2
Adam Henrique	Windsor Spitfires	4	4	4	8	4
Jimmy Bubnick	Calgary Hitmen	4	3	5	8	0
Tyler Shattock	Calgary Hitmen	4	2	5	7	0
Justin Shugg	Windsor Spitfires	3	2	5	7	2
Toni Rajala	Brandon Wheat Kings	5	2	5	7	0
Kris Foucault	Calgary Hitmen	4	3	3	6	0
Dale Mitchell	Windsor Spitfires	4	3	3	6	2
Cam Fowler	Windsor Spitfires	4	2	4	6	0
Eric Wellwood	Windsor Spitfires	4	2	4	6	0

GP = Games played; G = Goals; A = Assists; Pts = Points; PIM = Penalty minutes

=== Goaltending ===
This is a combined table of the top goaltenders based on goals against average and save percentage with at least sixty minutes played. The table is sorted by GAA.

Player	Team	GP	W	L	SA	GA	GAA	SV%	SO	TOI
Philipp Grubauer	Windsor Spitfires	4	4	0	120	9	2.14	.930	0	252:00
Shane Owen	Moncton Wildcats	1	0	1	48	4	3.32	.923	0	72:00
Martin Jones	Calgary Hitmen	4	2	2	147	15	3.71	.907	0	242:00
Nicola Riopel	Moncton Wildcats	2	0	2	56	9	4.54	.862	0	119:00
Jacob DeSerres	Brandon Wheat Kings	5	2	2	140	22	4.66	.864	1	283:00

GP = Games played; W = Wins; L = Losses; SA = Shots against; GA = Goals against; GAA = Goals against average; SV% = Save percentage; SO = Shutouts; TOI = Time on ice (minutes:seconds)

== Rosters ==
=== Brandon Wheat Kings (Host) ===
- Head coach: Kelly McCrimmon

Pos.	No.	Player
GK	1	Jacob DeSerres
GK	35	Andrew Hayes
D	3	Brodie Melnychuk
D	4	Colby Robak
D	7	Mark Schneider
D	12	Travis Hamonic
D	22	Jordan Hale
D	26	Alexander Urbom
D	28	Darren Bestland
D	32	Ryley Miller
F	8	Brenden Walker
F	9	Brent Raedeke
F	10	Brayden Schenn
F	11	Matt Calvert
F	15	Scott Glennie
F	16	Mark Stone
F	17	Shayne Wiebe
F	19	Jesse Sinatynski
F	20	Aaron Lewadniuk
F	21	Toni Rajala
F	24	Jay Fehr
F	25	Paul Ciarelli
F	27	Micheal Ferland

=== Calgary Hitmen (WHL) ===
- Head coach:Mike Williamson

Pos.	No.	Player
GK	1	Michael Snider
GK	31	Martin Jones
D	2	Ben Wilson
D	5	Matt MacKenzie
D	7	Peter Kosterman
D	9	Jaynen Rissling
D	11	Zak Stebner
D	17	Giffen Nyren
D	27	Kyle Aschim
D	28	Michael Stone
F	10	Mikhail Fisenko
F	12	Justin Kirsch
F	14	Jimmy Bubnick
F	15	Brandon Kozun
F	16	Cody Sylvester
F	18	Kris Foucault
F	19	Ian Schultz
F	22	Mackenzie Royer
F	23	Tyler Fiddler
F	24	Del Cowan
F	25	Rigby Burgart
F	26	Joel Broda
F	29	Tyler Shattock
F	32	Cody Beach

=== Windsor Spitfires (OHL) ===
- Head coach: Bob Boughner

Pos.	No.	Player
GK	31	Troy Passingham
GK	33	Philipp Grubauer
D	6	Ryan Ellis
D	8	Craig Duininck
D	11	Marc Cantin
D	24	Cam Fowler
D	27	Saverio Posa
D	51	Mark Cundari
D	55	Harry Young
F	4	Taylor Hall
F	7	Adam Wallace
F	10	Stephen Johnston
F	14	Adam Henrique
F	19	Zack Kassian
F	26	Kenny Ryan
F	29	Derek Lanoue
F	44	Justin Shugg
F	64	Greg Nemisz
F	67	Eric Wellwood
F	70	James Woodcroft
F	71	Dale Mitchell
F	77	Scott Timmins

=== Moncton Wildcats (QMJHL) ===
- Head coach: Danny Flynn

Pos.	No.	Player
GK	29	Nicola Riopel
GK	41	Shane Owen
D	3	Brandon Gormley
D	8	Spencer Metcalfe
D	16	Patrick Downe
D	26	Alex MacDonald
D	40	Alex Wall
D	44	Mark Barberio
D	52	Simon Jodoin
D	58	David Savard
F	4	Tyler Howe
F	7	Kirill Kabanov
F	14	Ted Stephens
F	15	Marek Hrivík
F	17	Randy Cameron
F	18	Scott Trask
F	19	Allain Saulnier
F	21	Alex Saulnier
F	23	Daniel Pettersson
F	27	Scott Brannon
F	57	Nicolas Deschamps
F	74	Gabriel Bourque
F	81	Olivier Daoust
F	90	Kelsey Tessier
F	91	Devon MacAusland

== Awards ==
- Stafford Smythe Memorial Trophy (MVP) – Taylor Hall (Windsor Spitfires)
- Ed Chynoweth Trophy (Leading Scorer) – Taylor Hall (Windsor Spitfires)
- George Parsons Trophy (Sportsmanlike) – Toni Rajala (Brandon Wheat Kings)
- Hap Emms Memorial Trophy (Top Goalie) – Martin Jones (Calgary Hitmen)
- All-Star Team:

Goaltender: Martin Jones (Calgary Hitmen)
Defence: Travis Hamonic (Brandon Wheat Kings), Cam Fowler (Windsor Spitfires)
Forwards: Taylor Hall (Windsor Spitfires), Jimmy Bubnick (Calgary Hitmen), Matt Calvert (Brandon Wheat Kings)

== Road to the Cup ==
=== OHL playoffs ===
Conference Quarter-finals	Conference Semi-finals
1	Barrie	4
8	Sudbury	0
1	Barrie	4
5	Brampton	0
4	Kingston	3
5	Brampton	4
Eastern
3	Mississauga	4
6	Peterborough	0
3	Mississauga	4
2	Ottawa	3
2	Ottawa	4
7	Niagara	1
1	Windsor	4
8	Erie	0
1	Windsor	4
4	Plymouth	0
4	Plymouth	4
5	S.S. Marie	1
Western
3	Kitchener	4
6	Saginaw	2
3	Kitchener	4
2	London	3
2	London	4
7	Guelph	1

Conference Finals
1	Barrie	4
3	Mississauga	1
1	Windsor	4
3	Kitchener	3

OHL Championship
E1	Barrie	0
W1	Windsor	4

=== QMJHL playoffs ===
First round
1A	Saint John	4
4A	P.E.I.	1
2O	Montreal	3
3O	Gatineau	4
1E	Quebec	4
5A	Acadie-Bathurst	1
2C	Victoriaville	4
3C	Shawinigan	2
1C	Drummondville	4
4C	Lewiston	0
2E	Rimouski	4
3E	Chicoutimi	3
1O	Rouyn-Noranda	4
4O	Val-d'Or	2
2A	Moncton	4
3A	Cape Breton	1

Quarter-finals
1	Saint John	4
12	Gatineau	0
3	Quebec	0
6	Victoriaville	4
2	Drummondville	4
9	Rimouski	1
4	Rouyn-Noranda	1
5	Moncton	4

Semi-finals
1	Saint John	4
6	Victoriaville	2
2	Drummondville	1
5	Moncton	4

QMJHL Championships
1	Saint John	2
5	Moncton	4

=== WHL playoffs ===
Conference Quarter-finals	Conference Semi-finals
1	Calgary	4
8	Moose Jaw	3
1	Calgary	4
5	Medicine Hat	2
2	Brandon	4
7	Swift Current	0
Eastern
3	Saskatoon	4
6	Red Deer	0
2	Brandon	4
3	Saskatoon	2
4	Kootenay	2
5	Medicine Hat	4
1	Tri-City	4
8	Chilliwack	2
1	Tri-City	4
6	Kelowna	1
2	Vancouver	4
7	Kamloops	0
Western
3	Everett	3
6	Kelowna	4
2	Vancouver	4
5	Portland	2
4	Spokane	3
5	Portland	4

Conference Finals
1	Calgary	4
2	Brandon	1
1	Tri-City	4
2	Vancouver	2

WHL Championship
E1	Calgary	4
W1	Tri-City	1

== Media coverage ==
All of the tournaments' games were televised throughout Canada on Rogers Sportsnet and in the United States on the NHL Network. The Brandon Sun, Brandon's local daily newspaper, covered the entire tournament in print as well as online.
