= Philipp Grubauer =

German ice hockey player (born 1991)

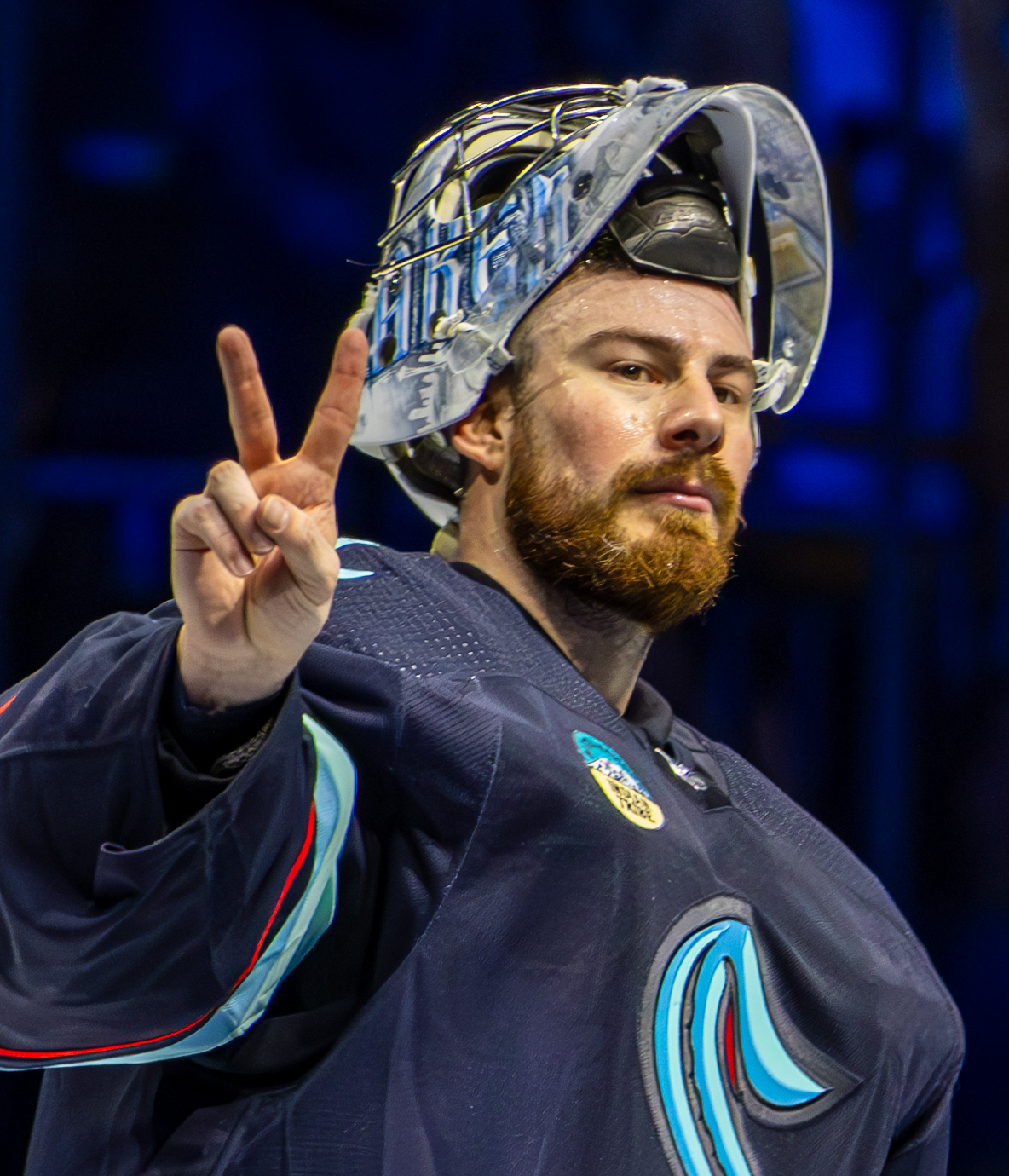
- Grubauer with the Seattle Kraken in February 2024
- Born: 25 November 1991 (age 34) Rosenheim, Germany
- Height: 6 ft 2 in (188 cm)
- Weight: 185 lb (84 kg; 13 st 3 lb)
- Position: Goaltender
- Catches: Left
- NHL team Former teams: Seattle Kraken; Washington Capitals; Colorado Avalanche
- National team: Germany
- NHL draft: 112th overall, 2010; Washington Capitals
- Playing career: 2011–present

Philipp Grubauer (born 25 November 1991) is a German professional ice hockey player who is a goaltender for the Seattle Kraken of the National Hockey League (NHL). He was drafted by the Washington Capitals in the fourth round, 112th overall, of the 2010 NHL entry draft.

Playing major junior hockey, Grubauer won the Memorial Cup with the Ontario Hockey League (OHL)'s Windsor Spitfires in 2010. He started his professional career with the Capitals the next season. In April 2015, while playing for the Capitals, Grubauer became the first German-born goaltender to start and win a Stanley Cup playoff game. Grubauer won the Stanley Cup as a member of the Capitals in 2018. Grubauer then spent three years with the Colorado Avalanche before signing a contract with the Kraken. Grubauer is the first Kraken goaltender to record a shutout, doing so in February 2022.

Internationally, Grubauer represents Germany. He played at the World U-17 Hockey Challenge and World U18 Championship in 2008. Following his play in the 2009 World Junior Championships, Germany was relegated to Division I A. Grubauer helped Germany back to the top division in 2010. He also competed in the 2011 installment. Grubauer has participated in five senior World Championships – 2014, 2017, 2019, 2022, and 2024. In 2018, he competed in the qualification round for the 2018 Winter Olympics, helping Germany clinch a spot.

== Playing career ==
=== Early career (2004–2011) ===
Grubauer began his career in Germany, playing for his hometown's junior team, the Starbulls Rosenheim. He began playing for them in 2004 at the age of 13. The Starbulls played in the Oberliga, the third tier of German ice hockey. His debut with the Starbulls' senior club came on 17 February 2008, when he was 16, in a 2–0 shutout victory. Following the season, in the relegation round, the Starbulls' primary goaltender was not playing well. The team's coach then approached Grubauer, who agreed to play. Rosenheim won the game 2–1. Grubauer played six more games, saving the team from relegation. Following the 2007–08 season, Grubauer moved to North America to play with the Belleville Bulls of the Ontario Hockey League (OHL) after being selected 25th overall in the 2008 Canadian Hockey League (CHL) Import Draft.

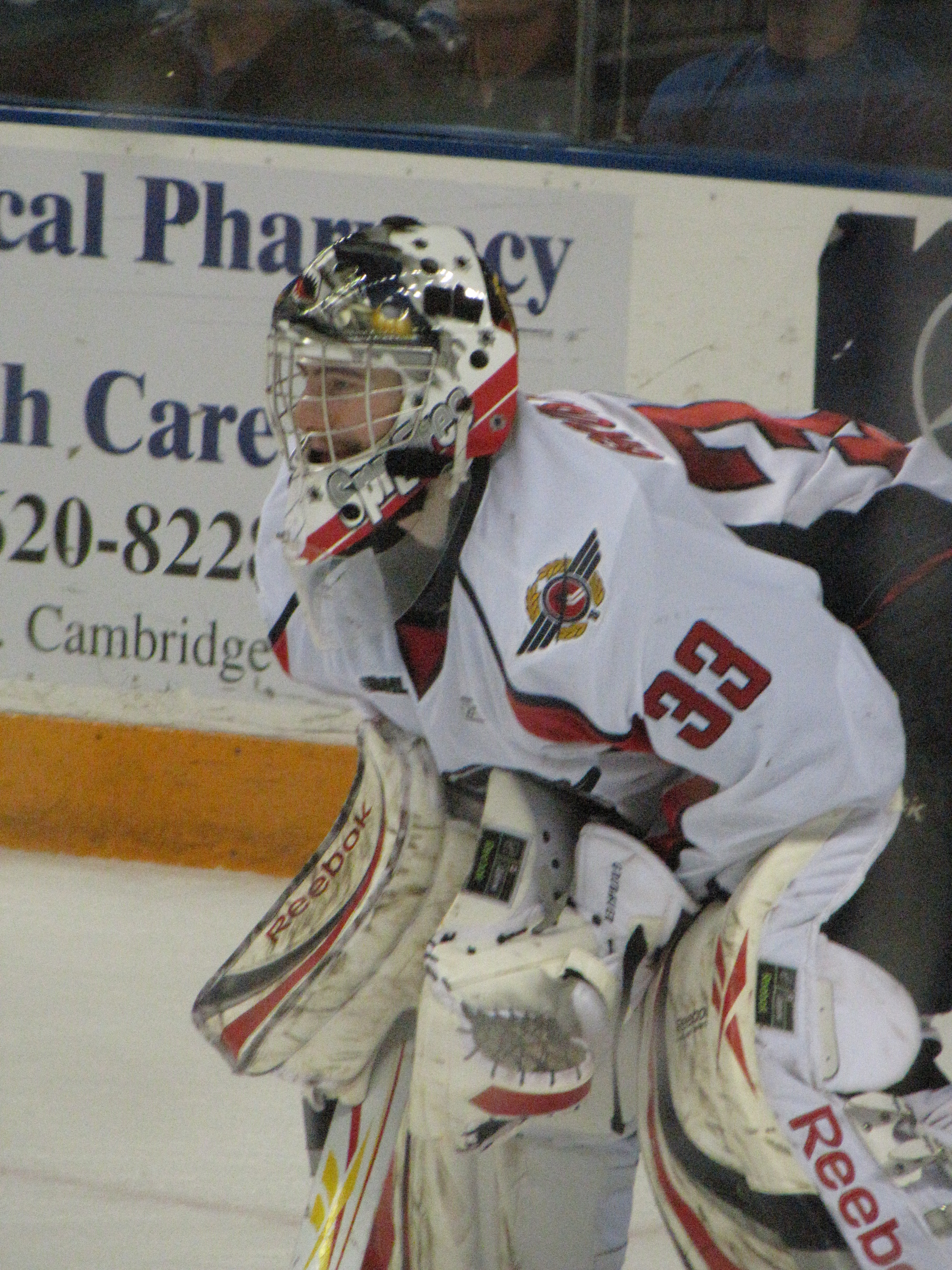
Grubauer with the Windsor Spitfires in 2010

With the Bulls, Grubauer served as the backup goaltender to Mike Murphy for the 2008–09 season, and he only played 17 games. He became the team's starter in 2009–10 and played in 31 games for the Bulls before being traded on 4 January 2010 to the Windsor Spitfires in a seven-player deal. At the age of 18, Grubauer helped the Spitfires win the Memorial Cup for the second consecutive year in May 2010. Grubauer led all goaltenders in the tournament with a .930 save percentage and a 2.14 goals against average (GAA). On 26 June 2010, Grubauer was selected in the fourth round, 112th overall, by the Washington Capitals in the 2010 NHL entry draft.

Just a few days after the NHL Draft, Grubauer, along with Windsor's first-round 2010 CHL Import Draft pick, was traded to the Kingston Frontenacs in exchange for Nick Czinder, A. J. Jarosz, Kingston's first-round pick in the 2010 CHL Import Draft, and Kingston's second- and seventh-round (conditional) picks in the 2011 OHL Priority Selection. Grubauer signed a three-year, entry-level contract with the Washington Capitals on 4 October 2010 as his season with the Frontenacs began. Grubauer played 38 games with the Frontenacs, achieving a 22–13–3 record with a .903 save percentage and 3.62 GAA, before falling ill with mononucleosis in February.

=== Professional ===
==== Washington Capitals (2011–2018) ====
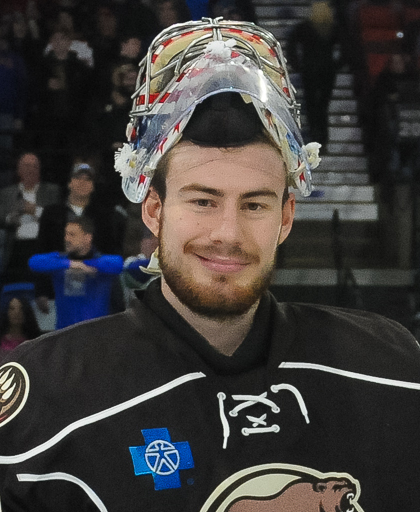
Grubauer with the Hershey Bears in January 2015

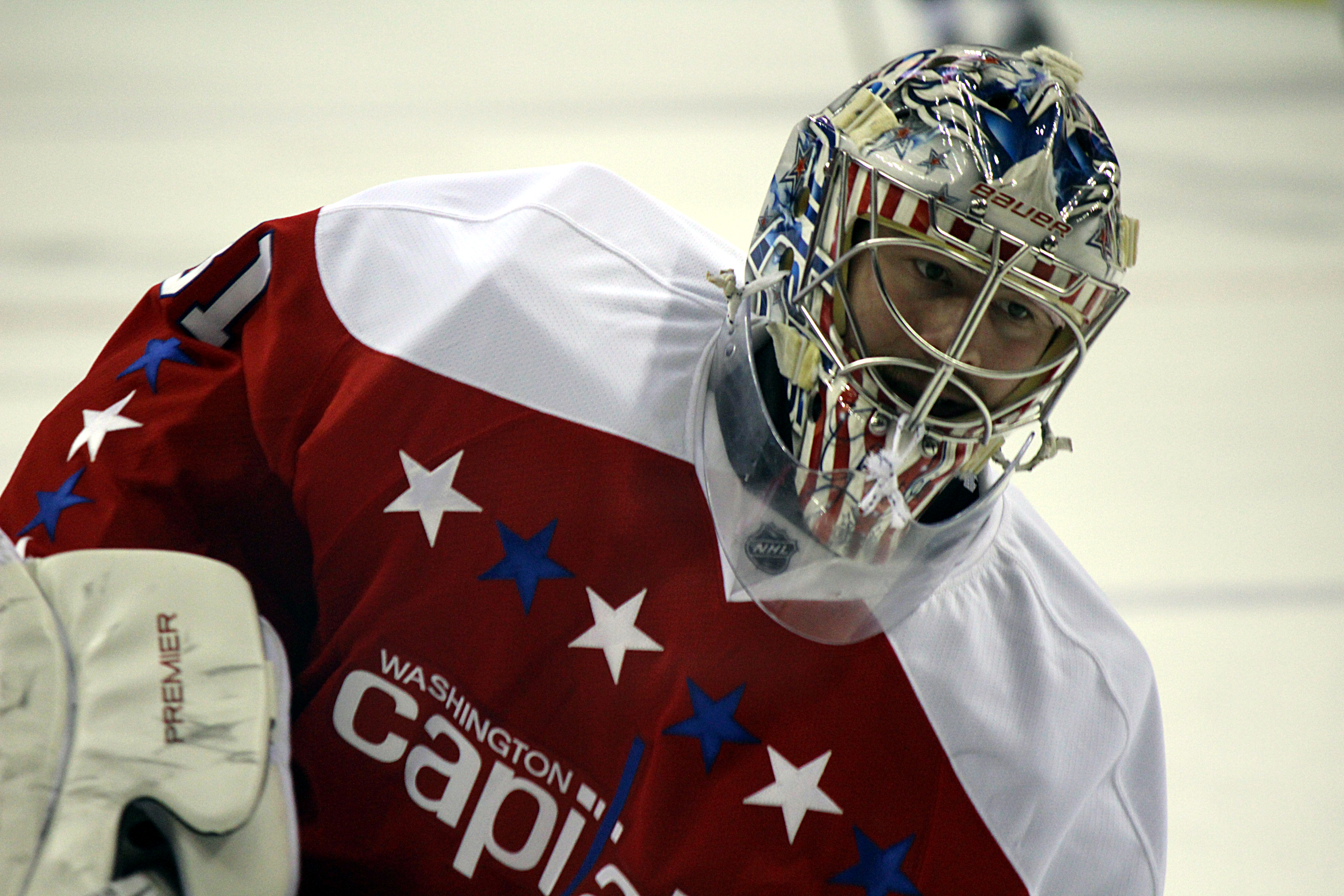
Grubauer playing for the Washington Capitals in April 2016

Grubauer returned to the ice for the first time since his bout with mononucleosis at the Capitals' 2011–12 season development camp. He reported that he had lost 20 pounds while ill. Following training camp in September, Grubauer was assigned to the South Carolina Stingrays, the ECHL affiliate of the Capitals. Grubauer was recalled to the American Hockey League (AHL)'s Hershey Bears on 12 October 2011, but did not play any games and returned to the Stingrays on 23 October. On 8 November 2011, the ECHL announced that Grubauer had been named the Reebok Hockey ECHL Goaltender of the Week for the week of 31 October to 6 November, as Grubauer went 3–0–0 with one shutout, a 1.00 GAA and a .960 save percentage during that span. Grubauer was named the ECHL's Goaltender of the Month for November. In eight games with the Stingrays in November, he went 6–1–1 with one shutout, a 1.73 GAA and a .935 save percentage. Grubauer was named ECHL Rookie of the Month in January and, at the conclusion of the season, was named to the ECHL All-Rookie Team for 2011–12.

In the 2012–13 season, the Washington Capitals' ECHL affiliation became the Reading Royals. Grubauer split the season between Reading and Hershey, moving up to Hershey when the NHL ended its lockout and when goaltender Braden Holtby was promoted to Washington full-time for the 2012–13 season. On 23 February 2013, Grubauer recorded his first AHL shutout, making 40 saves in a 3–0 victory over the Adirondack Phantoms. A few days later, on 27 February 2013, Grubauer made his NHL debut with the Capitals in relief of Holtby in a 4–1 loss to the Philadelphia Flyers, stopping all 14 shots faced in just over 25 minutes of play. Grubauer made his first NHL start on 9 March 2013, in a 5–2 loss to the New York Islanders. He faced 45 shots in the game, stopping 40.

For the 2013–14 season, Grubauer's place in the hierarchy fell behind Holtby and Michal Neuvirth, so he played most of the season with Hershey. On 29 November 2013, Neuvirth suffered a leg injury during warmups, which allowed Grubauer a spot with Washington. Over the season, Grubauer played 17 games with the Capitals. He went 6–5–5 and managed a .925 save percentage and 2.38 GAA. Grubauer played most of the 2014–15 season with Hershey. In April 2015, Grubauer found another opportunity to play with the Capitals after Holtby fell ill. On 17 April 2015, Grubauer would become the first German goaltender to start a playoff game, a 4–3 win against the New York Islanders in the second game of the first round of the Stanley Cup playoffs. On 15 June, Grubauer signed a two-year, $1.5 million contract with the Capitals.

During the 2015–16 season, Grubauer saw action in 22 games with the Capitals, going 8–9–1 and notching a 2.32 GAA and a .918 save percentage. These statistics helped Grubauer make the roster of Team Europe for the 2016 World Cup of Hockey after an injury to Danish goaltender Frederik Andersen. The next season, 2016–17, Grubauer went 13–6–2, reaching an even better 2.04 GAA and .926 save percentage. On 6 July 2017, the Capitals re-signed Grubauer to a one-year, $1.5 million contract. During the 2017–18 season, Grubauer recorded a career-high 15 wins in 28 starts. Grubauer was the Capitals' starter to begin the 2018 Stanley Cup playoffs after a strong 7–3–0 record in 10 of the final 16 games in the Capitals' regular season. Grubauer made 23 saves in a 4–3 overtime loss in Game One against the Columbus Blue Jackets. However, Holtby permanently took over the goaltending duties from Grubauer after replacing him during Game 2 of the series. The Capitals ended up winning the Stanley Cup after defeating the Vegas Golden Knights in five games.

==== Colorado Avalanche (2018–2021) ====
On 22 June 2018, Grubauer and Brooks Orpik were traded to the Colorado Avalanche in exchange for a 2018 second-round pick during the 2018 NHL entry draft. The following day, the Avalanche re-signed Grubauer to a three-year, $10 million contract extension. During the 2018–19 season, Grubauer would display an 18–9–5 record and a .917 save percentage during the regular season, and a second-half surge led him to be named Colorado's starting goaltender for the 2019 Stanley Cup playoffs. He helped lead the Avalanche to a first-round upset over the first-place Calgary Flames, but lost in Round 2 to the San Jose Sharks in seven games. Grubauer recorded a 7–5 record with a 2.30 goals against average and a .925 save percentage during the playoffs. During the 2019 off-season, goaltender Semyon Varlamov signed a free-agent deal with the New York Islanders, cementing Grubauer's place as Colorado's starter. He made 36 starts in the regular season, going 18–12–4 and registering a 2.65 GAA and a .915 save percentage. In the first round of the playoffs against the Arizona Coyotes, Grubauer was 5–1 with a 1.49 GAA with a .937 save percentage, but he let in three goals on 10 shots before suffering an injury in the first game of the second round against the Dallas Stars.

With veteran backup Pavel Francouz injured the entire 2020–21 season, Grubauer had a heavy workload and started 39 contests. He finished the regular season with a record of 30–9–1, a GAA of 1.95, a save percentage of .922, and led the NHL with seven shutouts. His win total was second only to Andrei Vasilevskiy (31), and his GAA was second only to Alex Nedeljkovic (1.90), who played 17 fewer games than Grubauer. Grubauer's save percentage was good for ninth on the season, and he tied for the league lead in shutouts with Semyon Varlamov. On 10 May 2021, with his team needing a regulation win in order to prevent the Vegas Golden Knights from winning both the division and the Presidents' Trophy, Grubauer stopped 36 of 37 shots in a 2–1 victory. The Avalanche won their division and the Presidents' Trophy for the third time in franchise history three days later, after defeating the Los Angeles Kings 5–1 at home in the 56th and final game of the regular season. On 1 June 2021, Grubauer was named a Vezina Trophy finalist for the first time in his career. Grubauer continued his stellar play in the 2021 Stanley Cup playoffs as the Avalanche swept the St. Louis Blues in the West Division First Round. After defeating the Knights 3–2 in overtime in the second game of the second round and making a postseason career-high 39 saves, Grubauer became only the 10th goaltender in NHL history to record 10 or more consecutive victories in the postseason. He also broke famed Avalanche goaltender Patrick Roy's longstanding franchise record for a postseason win streak by attaining his sixth straight win. Roy had previously held the record with five straight wins, which he set three separate times.

==== Seattle Kraken (2021–present) ====
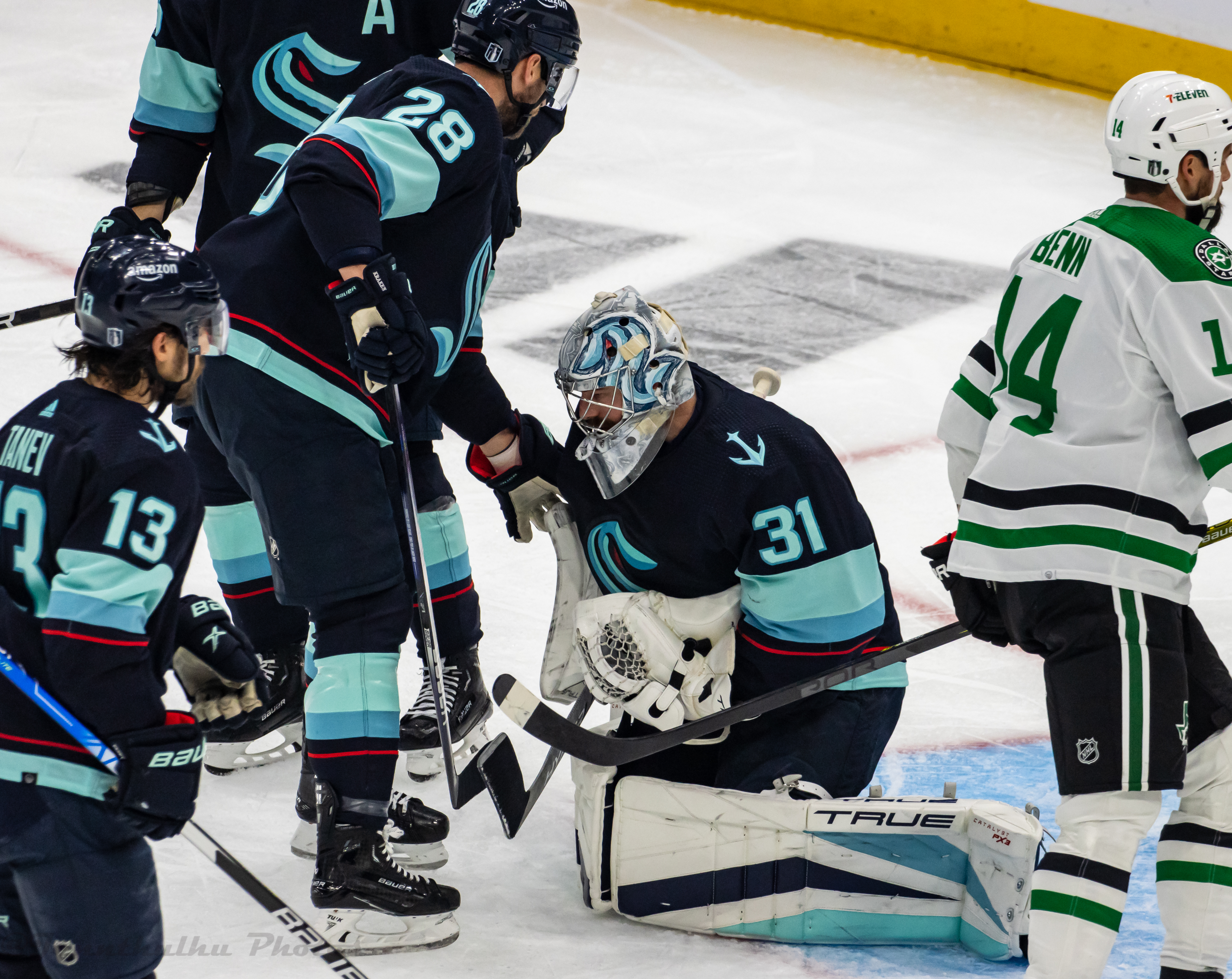
Grubauer with the Seattle Kraken during the second round of the 2023 Stanley Cup playoffs

On 28 July 2021, as a free agent and unable to come to terms with the Avalanche, Grubauer opted to sign a six-year, $35.4 million contract to join the new expansion club, the Seattle Kraken. He became the first Seattle Kraken goaltender to record a shutout on 2 February 2022, defeating the New York Islanders 3–0. He ended the Kraken's inaugural season with a 3.16 GAA and a .889 save percentage, making him one of the statistically worst starting goaltenders in the league.

For the 2022–23 season, the Kraken saw fellow goaltender Martin Jones sign a one-year contract with the team. This gave Grubauer a new teammate; Jones would start 42 games, and Grubauer would start 39. However, it was Grubauer who started on 6 April 2023, when the Kraken clinched their first-ever playoff berth following a 4–2 win over the Arizona Coyotes. Overall, Grubauer improved to a 2.85 GAA and a .895 save percentage, winning 17 of his 39 starts. During the 2023 Stanley Cup playoffs, Grubauer played all of the Kraken's 14 games, including a first round upset of his former team, the Avalanche, and the Kraken's second round loss to the Dallas Stars.

Grubauer was the primary starter for the Kraken for the beginning of the 2023–24 season before he was sidelined with a lower-body injury on 9 December 2023. Grubauer returned for the Kraken in late January. He ended the season with a 2.85 GAA and a .899 save percentage. On 29 January 2025, Grubauer was placed on waivers and sent to the Coachella Valley Firebirds, the Kraken's AHL affiliate. He played in seven games for the Firebirds and maintained a 5–2–0 record with an .893 save percentage and 2.87 GAA, before being recalled to the NHL on 2 March.

== International play ==
=== Junior ===
Grubauer has appeared in several international competitions, representing Germany. He participated in the 2008 World U-17 Hockey Challenge, where Germany placed ninth in the tournament; Grubauer was named to the tournament's All-Star team after posting a .909 save percentage and 3.49 GAA. Three months following the tournament, he played at the 2008 World U18 Championships, in which he was selected as Germany's Player of the Game in Germany's 9–2 loss to Canada on the first day of round robin play.

At the age of 17, Grubauer participated in the 2009 World Junior Championships. However, Germany won just one game in the tournament, and following a ninth-place finish, was relegated to Division I for the 2010 World Junior Championships. During that tournament Germany placed first in their group, winning all five of their games in order to put them back in the top division for the 2011 World Junior Championships. Germany's success was largely due to the play of Grubauer, who posted a 0.64 GAA and a .974 save percentage in five games. He then participated in the 2011 World Junior Championships, but Germany performed similarly to the 2009 World Junior Championships and finished 10th, sending them back to Division I for 2012. Grubauer recorded losses for all four games he started in the tournament.

=== Senior ===
Grubauer's first senior international tournament came at the 2014 World Championship. On 12 May 2014, he achieved his first ever international win, a 3–2 victory over Latvia. Grubauer chose to compete again at the 2017 World Championship. Germany participated in the qualification round for the 2018 Winter Olympics. Grubauer started with back-to-back shutouts over Japan (5–0) and Austria (6–0). He then helped Germany beat the host Latvia 3–2 to secure Germany's bid to the Olympics. Grubauer then played at the 2019 World Championship. Grubauer then competed three years later at the 2022 World Championship. Most recently, Grubauer has competed at the 2024 World Championship and at the 2026 Winter Olympics.

== Career statistics ==
=== Regular season and playoffs ===
			Regular season									Playoffs
Season	Team	League	GP	W	L	OTL	MIN	GA	SO	GAA	SV%	GP	W	L	MIN	GA	SO	GAA	SV%
2007–08	Starbulls Rosenheim	3.GBun	5	—	—	—	—	—	—	2.73	—	—	—	—	—	—	—	—	—
2008–09	Belleville Bulls	OHL	17	7	8	0	947	62	0	3.93	.888	1	0	0	56	4	0	4.26	.902
2009–10	Belleville Bulls	OHL	31	10	14	5	1,717	90	0	3.14	.913	—	—	—	—	—	—	—	—
2009–10	Windsor Spitfires	OHL	19	13	1	2	1,011	40	2	2.37	.906	18	16	2	1,094	49	2	2.69	.909
2010–11	Kingston Frontenacs	OHL	38	22	13	3	2,239	135	2	3.62	.903	—	—	—	—	—	—	—	—
2011–12	South Carolina Stingrays	ECHL	43	23	13	5	2,536	94	1	2.22	.918	—	—	—	—	—	—	—	—
2012–13	Reading Royals	ECHL	26	19	5	1	1,542	59	0	2.30	.912	—	—	—	—	—	—	—	—
2012–13	Hershey Bears	AHL	28	15	9	2	1,624	61	2	2.25	.919	5	2	3	301	19	0	3.79	.901
2012–13	Washington Capitals	NHL	2	0	1	0	84	5	0	3.57	.915	—	—	—	—	—	—	—	—
2013–14	Hershey Bears	AHL	28	13	13	2	1,685	73	3	2.60	.916	—	—	—	—	—	—	—	—
2013–14	Washington Capitals	NHL	17	6	5	5	883	35	0	2.38	.925	—	—	—	—	—	—	—	—
2014–15	Hershey Bears	AHL	49	27	17	5	2,918	112	6	2.30	.921	7	2	4	394	22	0	3.35	.901
2014–15	Washington Capitals	NHL	1	1	0	0	65	2	0	1.85	.920	1	1	0	60	3	0	3.00	.857
2015–16	Washington Capitals	NHL	22	8	9	1	1,111	43	0	2.32	.918	—	—	—	—	—	—	—	—
2016–17	Washington Capitals	NHL	24	13	6	2	1,265	43	3	2.04	.926	1	0	0	19	2	0	6.32	.778
2017–18	Washington Capitals	NHL	35	15	10	3	1,865	73	3	2.35	.923	2	0	1	105	8	0	4.57	.837
2018–19	Colorado Avalanche	NHL	37	18	9	5	2,021	89	3	2.64	.917	12	7	5	732	28	1	2.30	.925
2019–20	Colorado Avalanche	NHL	36	18	12	4	2,058	90	2	2.63	.916	7	5	1	385	12	1	1.87	.922
2020–21	Colorado Avalanche	NHL	40	30	9	1	2,367	77	7	1.95	.922	10	6	4	598	26	0	2.61	.914
2021–22	Seattle Kraken	NHL	55	18	31	5	3,112	164	2	3.16	.889	—	—	—	—	—	—	—	—
2022–23	Seattle Kraken	NHL	39	17	14	4	2,066	98	0	2.85	.895	14	7	7	823	41	0	2.99	.903
2023–24	Seattle Kraken	NHL	36	14	16	2	1,997	95	2	2.85	.899	—	—	—	—	—	—	—	—
2024–25	Seattle Kraken	NHL	26	8	17	1	1,460	85	0	3.49	.875	—	—	—	—	—	—	—	—
2024–25	Coachella Valley Firebirds	AHL	7	5	2	0	418	20	0	2.87	.893	—	—	—	—	—	—	—	—
2025–26	Seattle Kraken	NHL	32	13	12	4	1,791	79	0	2.65	.909	—	—	—	—	—	—	—	—
NHL totals			402	179	151	37	22,143	978	22	2.65	.908	47	26	18	2,722	120	2	2.65	.910

=== International ===
Year	Team	Event	Result	GP	W	L	T	MIN	GA	SO	GAA	SV%
2008	Germany	U17	9th	5	—	—	—	—	—	—	3.49	.909
2008	Germany	U18	5th	4	—	—	—	—	—	—	4.16	.877
2009	Germany	WJC	9th	3	—	—	—	109	12	0	6.61	.838
2010	Germany	WJC-D1	P	5	—	—	—	—	—	—	0.64	.974
2011	Germany	WJC	10th	4	0	4	0	176	13	0	4.44	.888
2014	Germany	WC	14th	2	0	1	0	118	4	0	2.03	.921
2017	Germany	WC	8th	2	0	1	0	125	5	0	2.42	.938
2018	Germany	OGQ	Q	3	3	0	0	180	2	2	0.67	.970
2019	Germany	WC	6th	3	1	1	0	147	7	0	2.86	.920
2022	Germany	WC	7th	5	2	2	0	296	12	1	2.43	.907
2024	Germany	WC	6th	6	4	2	0	339	17	0	3.01	.895
2025	Germany	WC	9th	4	2	0	1	238	8	0	2.02	.930
2026	Germany	OG	6th	4	2	2	0	237	11	0	2.79	.912
2026	Germany	WC	10th	6	3	2	1	357	8	0	2.52	.889
Junior totals				21	—	—	—	—	—	—	3.87	.897
Senior totals				35	17	11	2	2,037	74	3	2.18	.921

== Awards and honours ==
Award	Year	Ref
ECHL
All-Rookie Team	2011–12	
NHL
Stanley Cup champion	2018	
International
World U-17 Hockey Challenge All-Star Team	2008	
