= Cam Fowler =

American ice hockey player (born 1991)

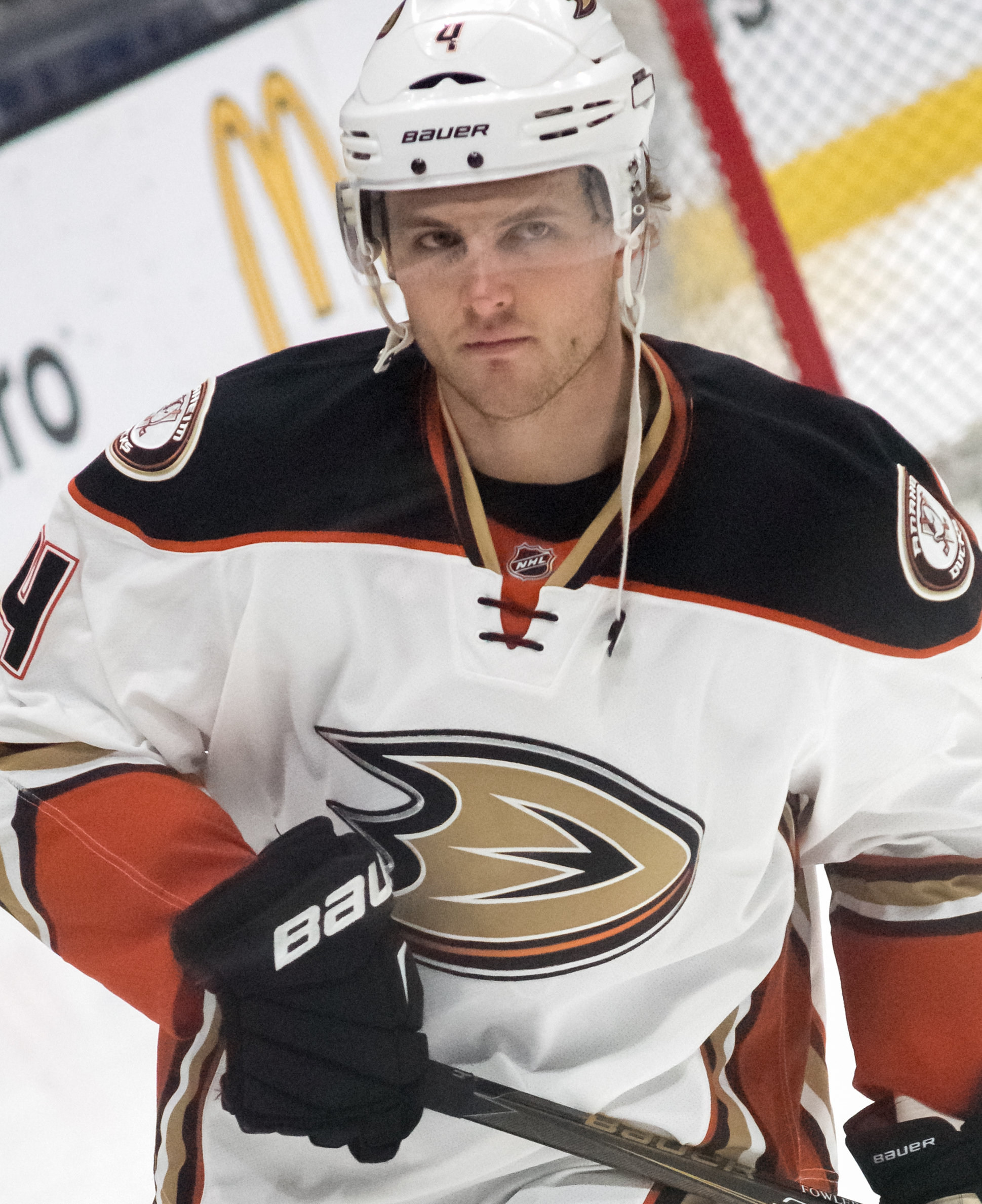
- Fowler with the Anaheim Ducks in 2016
- Born: December 5, 1991 (age 34) Windsor, Ontario, Canada
- Height: 6 ft 1 in (185 cm)
- Weight: 207 lb (94 kg; 14 st 11 lb)
- Position: Defense
- Shoots: Left
- NHL team Former teams: St. Louis Blues; Anaheim Ducks
- National team: United States
- NHL draft: 12th overall, 2010; Anaheim Ducks
- Playing career: 2010–present

Cameron Matthew Fowler (born December 5, 1991) is a Canadian-born American professional ice hockey player who is a defenseman for the St. Louis Blues of the National Hockey League (NHL). He was selected 12th overall by the Anaheim Ducks in the 2010 NHL entry draft, for whom he played the first 15 seasons of his NHL career.

A dual citizen, Fowler represents the United States internationally and won a gold medal as a member of the junior team at the 2010 World Junior Championships. He was a member of the Windsor Spitfires team that won the J. Ross Robertson Cup in 2009–10, as well as the 2010 Memorial Cup.

== Early life ==
Fowler was born in Windsor, Ontario, the son of Perry and Bridget Fowler. Perry was a native of Newfoundland and Labrador and Bridget is a native of Michigan, making Cam a dual citizen. An employee of the Ford Motor Company, Perry moved his family to Farmington Hills, Michigan, before Cam's second birthday. His younger sisters were both born in the U.S. Fowler attended Farmington High School, where he played baseball in addition to ice hockey. He also played travel baseball for the South Farmington Blues and had great potential to be a Division One College pitcher.

== Playing career ==
=== Junior ===
As a youth, Fowler played in the 2004 Quebec International Pee-Wee Hockey Tournament with the Detroit Honeybaked minor ice hockey team. Describing himself as being one of the weaker players on the team as a youth, Fowler's potential as a hockey player did not emerge until his teenage years.

Fowler was recruited by numerous National Collegiate Athletic Association (NCAA) Division I schools from age 14. He signed a National Letter of Intent with the University of Notre Dame in November 2008 during the early signing period. The USA Hockey National Team Development Program (USNTDP) also recruited him to their organization.

The Ontario Hockey League (OHL)'s Kitchener Rangers drafted Fowler with their first pick in the 2007 OHL Priority Selection; however, given that he had already committed to Notre Dame and playing in the OHL would have cost him his eligibility to play in the NCAA, Fowler refused to sign with the Rangers and instead made a two-year commitment to play for the USNTDP. With the development team, he was a member of the gold medal-winning American team at the 2009 IIHF World U18 Championships, where was named the best defenseman of the tournament and an all-star.

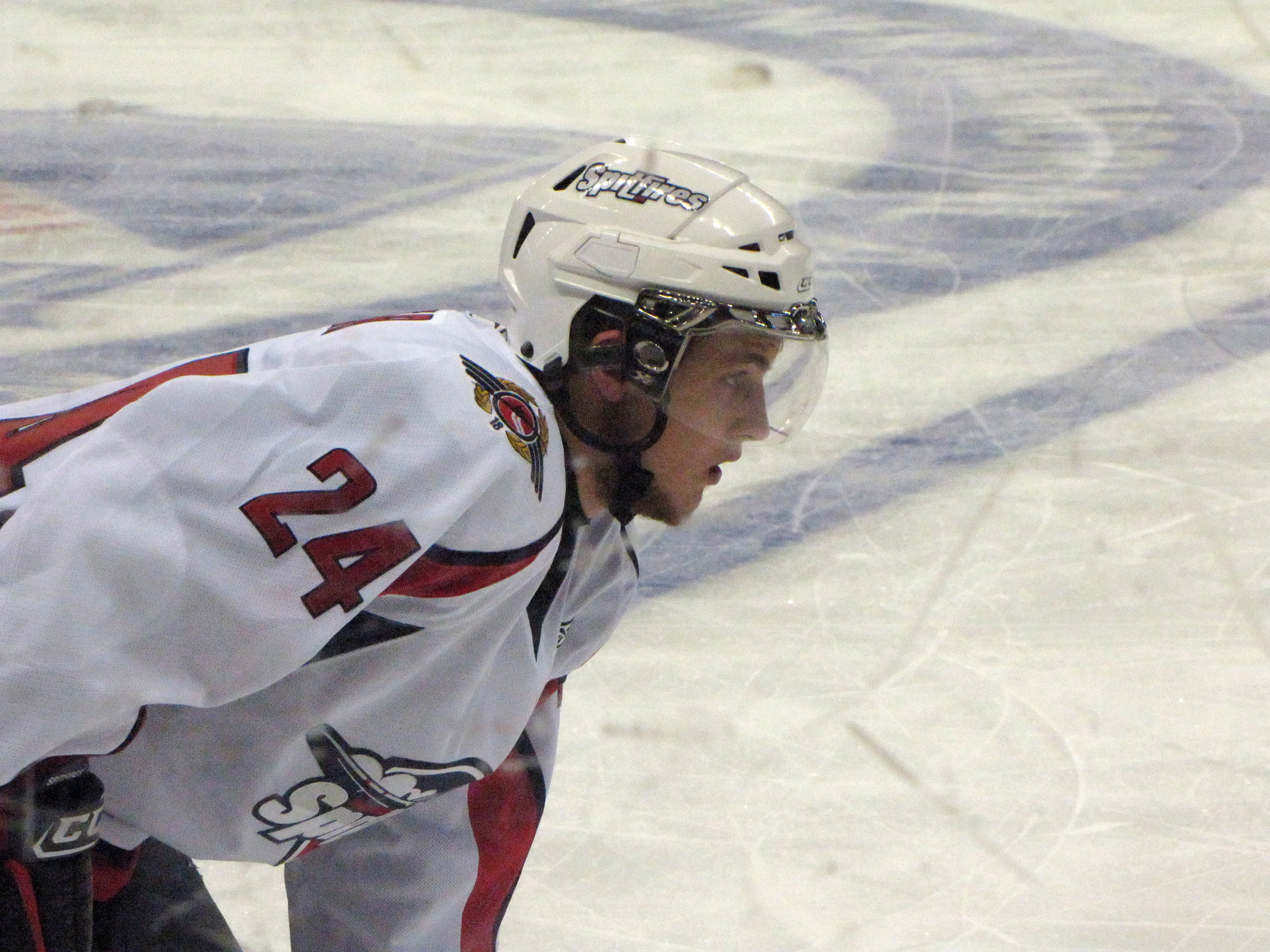
Fowler played with the Spitfires from 2009 to 2010

The Rangers surrendered his OHL rights at about the same time Fowler was reconsidering his commitment to play in the NCAA. The Windsor Spitfires then selected him with their first pick in the 2008 Priority Selection, after which he broke his agreement with Notre Dame and agreed to play for Windsor in the 2009–10 season. Fowler made the decision with the belief that playing in the OHL would better prepare him for an NHL career. The decision upset University officials, who alleged he was paid "under the table" by the OHL. Notre Dame Fighting Irish ice hockey team head coach Jeff Jackson alleged that the Rangers had offered Fowler a package worth $500,000 to break his commitment with Notre Dame and believed that Windsor had also made a financial offer to lure him away from the school. Fowler denied the accusations, stating he was "completely honest" with both Notre Dame and the Kitchener Rangers.

Fowler joined the Spitfires in 2009 and emerged as one of the top offensive-defensemen in the league, scoring 55 points in 55 games. He added 14 points in the playoffs to help lead Windsor to its second consecutive J. Ross Robertson Cup championship. The Spitfires then won the 2010 Memorial Cup as Canadian Hockey League (CHL) champions. Fowler left the Spitfires briefly during the season to play with the U.S. at the 2010 World Junior Ice Hockey Championships, winning a gold medal after defeating Canada 6–5 in overtime in the championship game.

The NHL Central Scouting Bureau ranked Fowler as the fifth-best North American prospect for the 2010 NHL entry draft in their final update. He had dropped two places, having been ranked at number three, behind Taylor Hall and Tyler Seguin, for most of the season. He was described by the NHL Central Scouting Bureau as an offensive quarterback on the powerplay who relies on his skating and puck control. He has been compared to NHL defensemen Chris Pronger and Dion Phaneuf, but does not play the same physical style as the two. Despite these accolades, Fowler's draft night lasted longer than expected, as he dropped to 12th overall, selected by the Anaheim Ducks.

=== Professional ===
==== Anaheim Ducks (2010–2024) ====
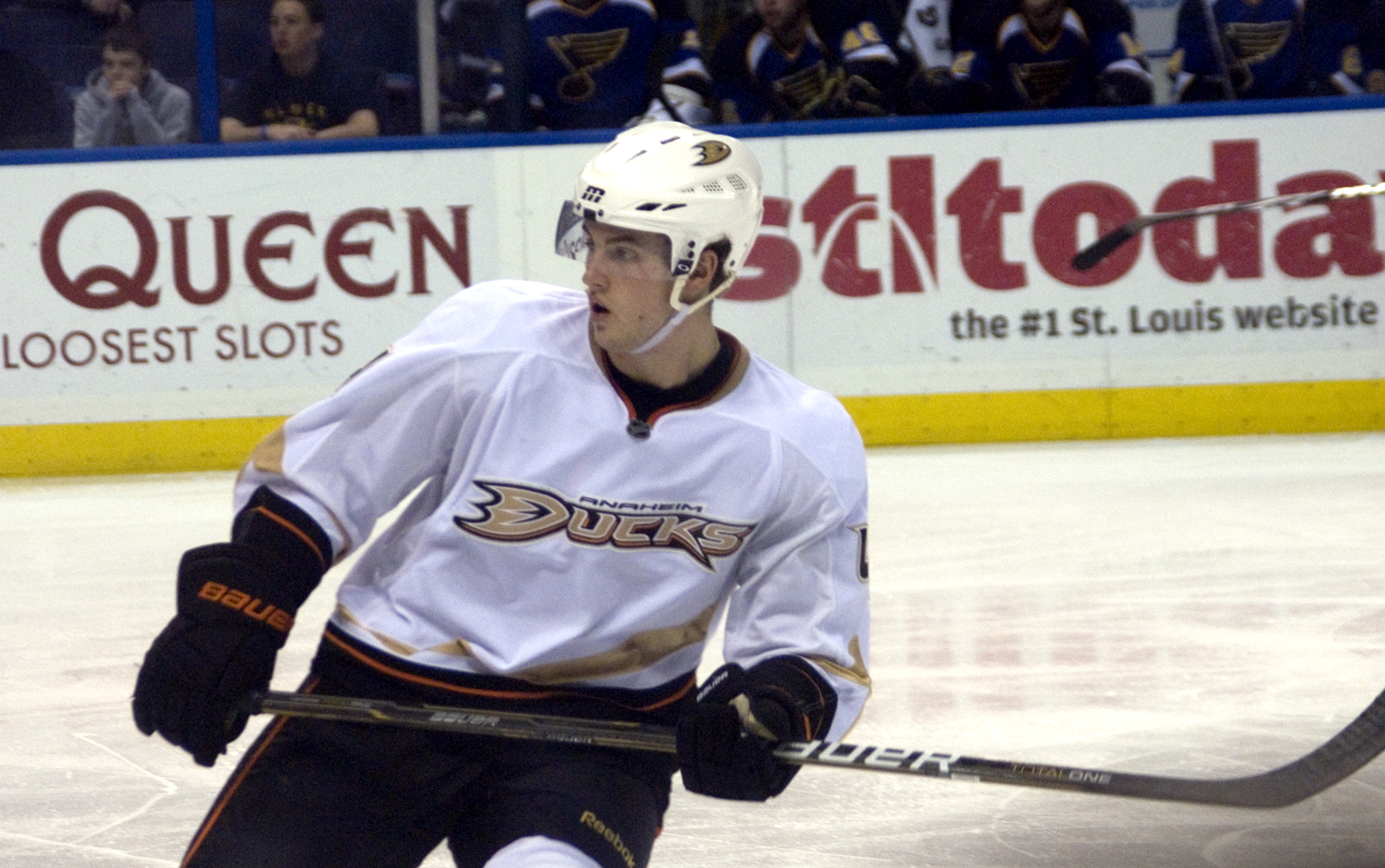
Fowler during a game in 2011, his debut season with the Anaheim Ducks

Fowler began the 2010–11 season on the Ducks' opening night lineup. He scored his first career NHL goal on October 17 against Phoenix Coyotes' goaltender Jason LaBarbera in a 3–2 win. Fowler was selected to the 2011 NHL All-Star Game as part of the rookie class. Fowler ended the season with ten goals and 40 points in 76 games.

Fowler played in all 82 games during the 2011–12 season, registering 29 points, playing in all situations for the Ducks. Entering the final year of his entry-level contract, the Ducks signed Fowler to a five-year, $20 million contract extension on September 12, 2012. For the duration of the 2012–13 NHL lockout, Fowler played for Södertälje SK in Sweden. He re-joined the Ducks once the season began. In the shortened-season, he had one goal and ten assists in 37 games. Fowler made his Stanley Cup playoff debut that spring. He and the Ducks lost in seven games to the Detroit Red Wings during the Western Conference Quarterfinals. Fowler had three assists. The 2013–14 season saw Fowler's defensive play improve to be considered a reliable two-way defenseman. However, he suffered a knee injury in March 2014 that kept him out for the remainder of the season. He returned for the playoffs where the Ducks were eliminated by the Los Angeles Kings in the Western Conference Semifinal.

Fowler led the Ducks defense corps through the 2014–15 season, with the team advancing all the way to the Western Conference Final in the 2015 Stanley Cup playoffs, only to be defeated by the Chicago Blackhawks in seven games. During the 2015–16 season, Fowler's sixth in the league, he had his first fight in a tilt with Brad Richardson of the Arizona Coyotes on October 14. The Ducks had another successful year, winning the Pacific Division and making the playoffs. However, they were eliminated in the first round by the Nashville Predators in seven games. Head coach Bruce Boudreau was fired following the defeat and was replaced by Randy Carlyle, who had coached the Ducks during the first year and a half of Fowler's NHL career. In the following season Fowler thrived, setting a new career-high in goals with eleven and reaching 36 points, the highest since his rookie year. He represented Anaheim at the 2017 NHL All-Star Game along with teammate Ryan Kesler. Fowler was suffered a knee injury at the end of the season. The Ducks made the playoffs again but Fowler missed the opening round due to the knee injury. They got through the first round and Fowler returned to the lineup, but were defeated by the Nashville Predators in the Western Conference Final. In Game 6, with Anaheim facing elimination, Fowler tied the game at 3–3 before the Predators scored three more goals to win 6–3.

On July 1, 2017, the Ducks signed Fowler to an eight-year, $52 million contract extension. Fowler was once again the top defenseman for the Ducks during the 2017–18 season, playing nearly 25 minutes per game. On October 17, 2017, Fowler played in his 500th NHL game, the youngest Duck to achieve the feat. He suffered an injury to his right leg in October and then a shoulder injury in April 2018 that caused him to miss time. The following season, on November 4, 2018, Fowler scored his first career hat-trick in a 3–2 overtime win against the Columbus Blue Jackets. On November 12, in a game against the Nashville Predators, Fowler was hit in the face by the puck causing a fracture in his face. He was subsequently placed on injured reserve two days later as he required a surgery to repair the facial fracture. He returned in January 2019 after missing 23 games. However, the Ducks, who had been struggling during his absence, continued to flounder and coach Randy Carlyle was fired. General manager Bob Murray took over as coach and several players were traded away. To accommodate newly acquired players, Fowler was asked to switch from his normal left side and play on the right side. The Ducks finished the season outside the playoffs for the first time in six years, with only Fowler, Ryan Getzlaf and Corey Perry remaining from the last time they missed.

During the 2019–20 season, Fowler was again the Ducks best defenseman and was most often paired with Erik Gudbranson. However, the Ducks failed to make the postseason. The pandemic-shortened 2020–21 season marked the beginning of a rebuild for the Ducks as they finished last in their division and gave playing time to a number of younger players. Fowler played in his 700th NHL game on February 27, 2021. In the 2021–22 season, Fowler took on a larger leadership role as the team's captain, Getzlaf, retired at the previous season's end. Fowler had been one of the players chosen to wear an "A" as an alternate captain in previous seasons. During the 2022–23 season, Fowler was part of the Ducks' worst defense in franchise history, allowing over four goals per game. Fowler took on a greater share of the workload once Jamie Drysdale went down with an injury. Drysdale's injury left Fowler as the only point-producing defenseman as John Klingberg and Kevin Shattenkirk played poorly. Fowler set a new career high in points with 48.

==== St. Louis Blues (2024–present) ====
On December 14, 2024, Fowler was traded to the St. Louis Blues in exchange for prospect Jérémie Biakabutuka and a second-round pick in 2027. Fowler departed the Ducks as their second longest-tenured player in franchise history (behind Ryan Getzlaf), as well as their all-time leader in goals, assists, and points by a defenseman. At the time of the trade, Fowler was nine games short of playing his 1,000th NHL game with the Ducks. He made his Blues debut that night in a 2–1 overtime loss to the Dallas Stars. He fit in well with his new team, playing on the Blues' top defense pairing alongside Colton Parayko. He registered his first point for St. Louis on December 19, assisting on Pavel Buchnevich's second period goal in a 3–1 loss to the Tampa Bay Lightning. On December 27, he recorded a three-point game, scoring one goal and two assists in a 7–4 victory over the Nashville Predators. Fowler ultimately played his 1,000th NHL game in the 2025 Winter Classic on December 31, becoming the first player in NHL history to play his 1,000th game in an outdoor game.

On September 27, 2025, Fowler signed a three-year contract extension with the Blues worth $18.3 million.

== International play ==
Medal record

Representing the United States

Men's ice hockey

World Junior Championships
Gold medal – first place	2010 United States	

IIHF U18 Championships
Gold medal – first place	2009 United States	

World U-17 Hockey Challenge
Silver medal – second place	2008 Canada	

Fowler represented the United States at the 2008 World U-17 Hockey Challenge. The team was defeated by Canada Ontario in the finals. He was then a member of the gold medal-winning United States under-18 team at the 2009 World U18 Championships, where was named the best defenseman of the tournament and an all-star.

Fowler played for the United States junior team at the 2010 World Junior Championships, winning a gold medal after defeating Canada junior team 6–5 in overtime of the championship game.

He was selected by USA Hockey to represent the United States senior team at the 2014 Winter Olympics. The team finished fourth in the tournament, losing to Finland senior team in the bronze medal game.

== Personal life ==
In 2018, Fowler and his wife Jasmine launched C4Kids to provide youth with opportunities to learn and play ice hockey. Fowler made a cameo appearance in episode 10 of the second season of the TV show The Mighty Ducks: Game Changers.

== Career statistics ==
=== Regular season and playoffs ===
			Regular season					Playoffs
Season	Team	League	GP	G	A	Pts	PIM	GP	G	A	Pts	PIM
2006–07	Detroit Honeybaked 18U AAA	T1EHL	31	3	7	10		—	—	—	—	—
2007–08	U.S. NTDP U17	USDP	59	2	12	14	12	—	—	—	—	—
2007–08	U.S. NTDP U18	NAHL	38	3	10	13	2	3	0	0	0	2
2007–08	U.S. NTDP U18	USDP	1	0	0	0	0	—	—	—	—	—
2008–09	U.S. NTDP U18	USDP	47	8	32	40	44	—	—	—	—	—
2008–09	U.S. NTDP U18	NAHL	14	2	7	9	12	—	—	—	—	—
2009–10	Windsor Spitfires	OHL	55	8	47	55	14	19	3	11	14	10
2010–11	Anaheim Ducks	NHL	76	10	30	40	20	6	1	3	4	2
2011–12	Anaheim Ducks	NHL	82	5	24	29	18	—	—	—	—	—
2012–13	Södertälje SK	Allsv	14	2	5	7	14	—	—	—	—	—
2012–13	Anaheim Ducks	NHL	37	1	10	11	4	7	0	3	3	0
2013–14	Anaheim Ducks	NHL	70	6	30	36	14	13	0	4	4	4
2014–15	Anaheim Ducks	NHL	80	7	27	34	14	16	2	8	10	2
2015–16	Anaheim Ducks	NHL	69	5	23	28	27	7	1	2	3	4
2016–17	Anaheim Ducks	NHL	80	11	28	39	20	13	2	7	9	2
2017–18	Anaheim Ducks	NHL	67	8	24	32	28	—	—	—	—	—
2018–19	Anaheim Ducks	NHL	59	5	18	23	20	—	—	—	—	—
2019–20	Anaheim Ducks	NHL	59	9	20	29	20	—	—	—	—	—
2020–21	Anaheim Ducks	NHL	56	5	18	23	18	—	—	—	—	—
2021–22	Anaheim Ducks	NHL	76	9	33	42	14	—	—	—	—	—
2022–23	Anaheim Ducks	NHL	82	10	38	48	14	—	—	—	—	—
2023–24	Anaheim Ducks	NHL	81	5	34	39	24	—	—	—	—	—
2024–25	Anaheim Ducks	NHL	17	0	4	4	6	—	—	—	—	—
2024–25	St. Louis Blues	NHL	51	9	27	36	8	7	2	8	10	0
2025–26	St. Louis Blues	NHL	82	4	26	30	14	—	—	—	—	—
NHL totals			1,124	109	414	523	283	69	8	35	43	14

=== International ===
Year	Team	Event	Result	GP	G	A	Pts	PIM
2008	United States	U17	2nd place, silver medalist(s)	6	0	0	0	4
2009	United States	U18	1st place, gold medalist(s)	7	1	7	8	4
2010	United States	WJC	1st place, gold medalist(s)	7	0	2	2	4
2011	United States	WC	8th	7	1	2	3	2
2012	United States	WC	7th	8	1	4	5	2
2014	United States	OG	4th	6	1	0	1	0
Junior totals				20	1	9	10	12
Senior totals				21	3	6	9	4

== Awards and honors ==
Award	Year	Ref
OHL
All-Star Game	2010	
Memorial Cup champion	2010	
Memorial Cup All-Star Team	2010	
NHL
All-Star Game	2017	
International
World U-17 Hockey Challenge All-Star Team	2008	
IIHF World U18 Championships best defenseman	2009	
IIHF World U18 Championships All-Star Team	2009	

== Notes ==
Awards and achievements
Preceded by Kyle Palmieri	Anaheim Ducks first-round draft pick 2010	Succeeded by Emerson Etem
