= Matt Calvert =

Canadian ice hockey player (born 1989)

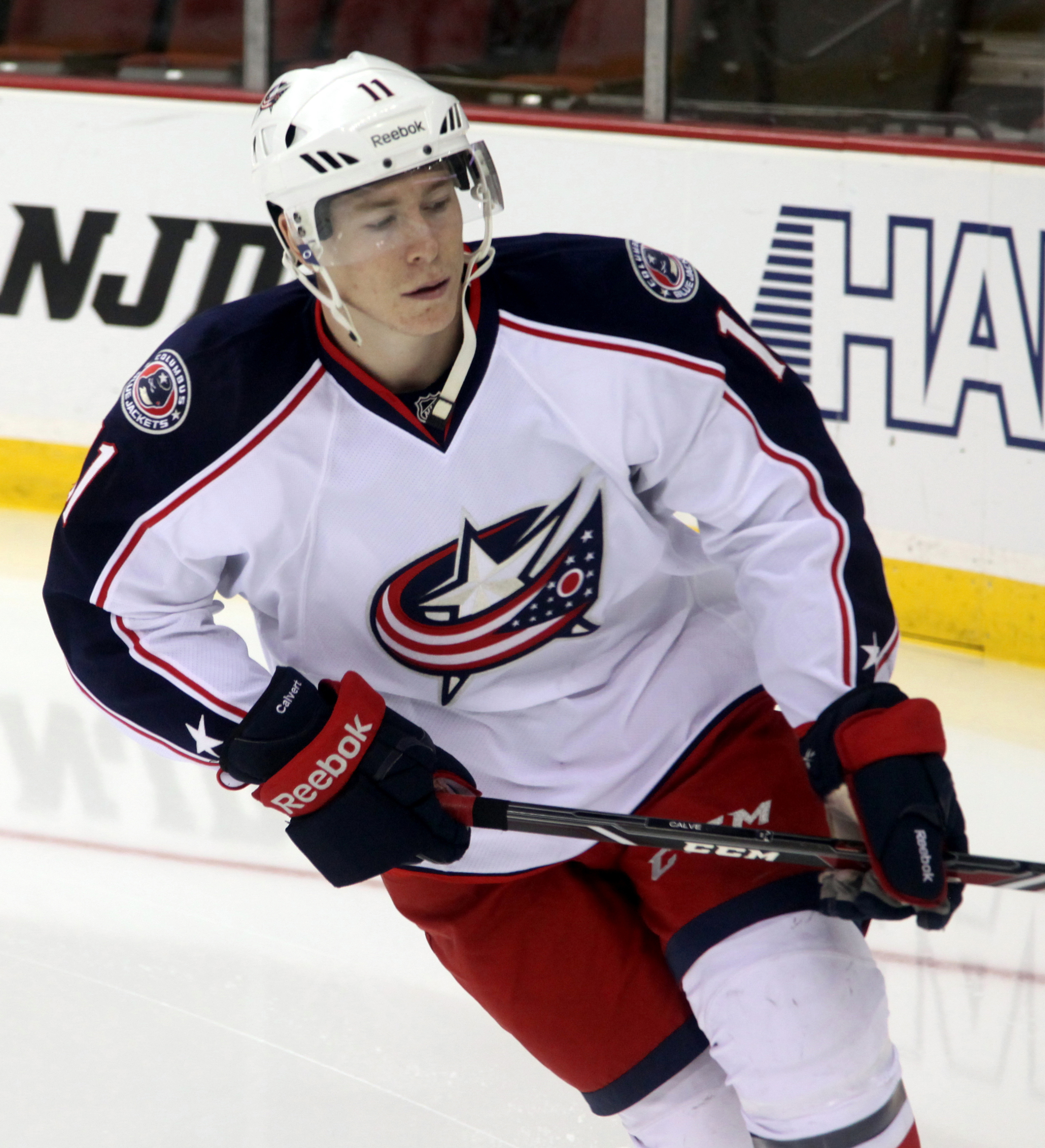
- Calvert with the Columbus Blue Jackets in 2014
- Born: December 24, 1989 (age 36) Brandon, Manitoba, Canada
- Height: 5 ft 10 in (178 cm)
- Weight: 174 lb (79 kg; 12 st 6 lb)
- Position: Left wing
- Shot: Left
- Played for: Columbus Blue Jackets; Colorado Avalanche
- NHL draft: 127th overall, 2008; Columbus Blue Jackets
- Playing career: 2010–2021

Matthew Dean Calvert (born December 24, 1989) is a Canadian former professional ice hockey left winger who played for the Columbus Blue Jackets and Colorado Avalanche during his career in the National Hockey League (NHL). He was drafted by the Blue Jackets in the fifth round, 127th overall, of the 2008 NHL entry draft.

== Playing career ==
=== Junior ===
Calvert began his junior career with a brief stint for the Winkler Flyers of the Manitoba Junior Hockey League (MJHL), during which he accumulated 15 penalty minutes in his only game with the club. The following year was his first of three seasons with the Brandon Wheat Kings of the Western Hockey League (WHL). He was named alternate captain for the Wheat Kings in his second season with the team.

After being drafted by the Columbus Blue Jackets in the 2008 NHL entry draft, Calvert opted to return to the Wheat Kings for a third season and a chance to win the 2010 Memorial Cup, set to be hosted by Brandon. He was named captain of the Wheat Kings for the 2009–10 season, during which he earned Second-Team Eastern Conference All-Star and Memorial Cup All-Star honours.

Calvert is also noted for scoring a natural short-handed hat-trick against the Calgary Hitmen in the 2010 WHL Eastern Conference Finals. With this feat, Calvert tied the WHL record for most short-handed goals in one game and became the only player in WHL history to score three short-handed goals in one period in the playoffs.

=== Professional ===
==== Columbus Blue Jackets ====
Calvert began the 2010–11 season with the Blue Jackets' American Hockey League (AHL) affiliate, the Springfield Falcons. Calvert was later called up to Columbus on January 6, 2011, and made his NHL debut two days later in a 6–0 loss to the Anaheim Ducks. He would score his first career NHL goal one game later against goaltender Jonathan Quick of the Los Angeles Kings. The Blue Jackets would assign Calvert to Springfield for the duration of the 2011 NHL All-Star Break before bringing him back up when they resumed regular season play.

On February 25, 2011, Calvert scored a natural hat-trick for the Blue Jackets in a 5–3 win over the Phoenix Coyotes. It was the first hat-trick of Calvert's NHL career and the 19th hat-trick in Blue Jackets history.

On April 19, 2014, Matt Calvert helped the Blue Jackets earn their first Stanley Cup playoff win by scoring a short-handed goal in the second period and the eventual game-winning goal in their 4–3 double overtime victory over the Pittsburgh Penguins.

Three years later, during the 2017 playoffs, Calvert was disciplined by the league for an on-ice attack on Tom Kühnhackl of the Pittsburgh Penguins.

In the 2017–18 season, Calvert proved his versatility throughout the lineup, registering 9 goals and 15 assists for 24 points in 69 games, matching career highs in assists and points while leading the team with two short-handed tallies. He also produced four points in six playoff contests.

==== Colorado Avalanche ====
On July 1, 2018, as a free agent, Calvert left the Blue Jackets after eight seasons to sign a three-year, $8.4 million contract with the Colorado Avalanche.

On July 22, 2021, Calvert announced his retirement from the NHL due to a career-ending injury.

== Personal life ==
Calvert and his wife Courtney were married in 2014. The couple has two sons, Kasey and Beau.

== Career statistics ==
			Regular season					Playoffs
Season	Team	League	GP	G	A	Pts	PIM	GP	G	A	Pts	PIM
2005–06	Brandon Wheat Kings AAA	MMHL	38	24	30	54	48	6	3	6	9	0
2006–07	Brandon Wheat Kings AAA	MMHL	30	28	55	83	46	16	5	13	18	16
2006–07	Winkler Flyers	MJHL	1	0	0	0	15	—	—	—	—	—
2007–08	Brandon Wheat Kings	WHL	72	24	40	64	53	6	1	2	3	2
2008–09	Brandon Wheat Kings	WHL	58	28	39	67	58	12	9	8	17	22
2009–10	Brandon Wheat Kings	WHL	68	47	52	99	70	15	9	7	16	15
2010–11	Springfield Falcons	AHL	38	13	12	25	12	—	—	—	—	—
2010–11	Columbus Blue Jackets	NHL	42	11	9	20	12	—	—	—	—	—
2011–12	Columbus Blue Jackets	NHL	13	0	3	3	16	—	—	—	—	—
2011–12	Springfield Falcons	AHL	56	17	19	36	52	—	—	—	—	—
2012–13	Springfield Falcons	AHL	34	10	11	21	39	—	—	—	—	—
2012–13	Columbus Blue Jackets	NHL	42	9	7	16	32	—	—	—	—	—
2013–14	Columbus Blue Jackets	NHL	56	9	15	24	53	6	2	2	4	4
2014–15	Columbus Blue Jackets	NHL	56	13	10	23	28	—	—	—	—	—
2015–16	Columbus Blue Jackets	NHL	73	11	13	24	51	—	—	—	—	—
2016–17	Columbus Blue Jackets	NHL	65	10	5	15	48	4	1	1	2	4
2017–18	Columbus Blue Jackets	NHL	69	9	15	24	33	6	3	1	4	4
2018–19	Colorado Avalanche	NHL	82	11	15	26	58	8	0	4	4	18
2019–20	Colorado Avalanche	NHL	50	12	13	25	39	8	1	2	3	4
2020–21	Colorado Avalanche	NHL	18	0	3	3	6	—	—	—	—	—
NHL totals			566	95	108	203	376	32	7	10	17	34

== Awards and honours ==
Award	Year
WHL
East Second All-Star Team	2010
CHL Memorial Cup All-Star Team	2010
