= Martin Jones (ice hockey) =

Canadian ice hockey player (born 1990)

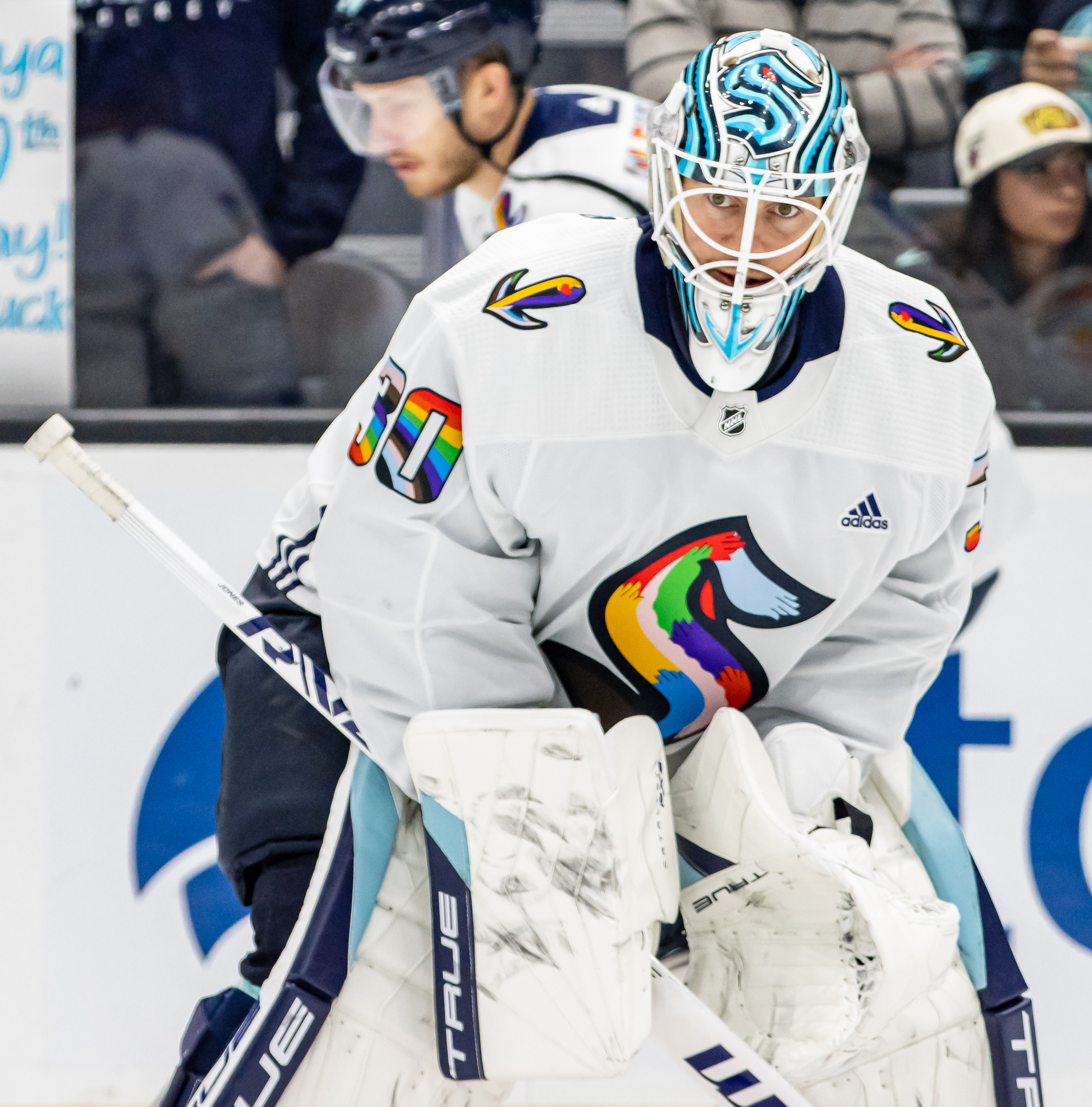
- Jones with the Seattle Kraken in March 2023
- Born: January 10, 1990 (age 36) North Vancouver, British Columbia, Canada
- Height: 6 ft 4 in (193 cm)
- Weight: 190 lb (86 kg; 13 st 8 lb)
- Position: Goaltender
- Caught: Left
- Played for: Los Angeles Kings; San Jose Sharks; Philadelphia Flyers; Seattle Kraken; Toronto Maple Leafs
- National team: Canada
- NHL draft: Undrafted
- Playing career: 2010–2024

Martin Jones (born January 10, 1990) is a Canadian former professional ice hockey player. He played as a goaltender for 11 seasons in the National Hockey League (NHL) for the Los Angeles Kings, San Jose Sharks, Philadelphia Flyers, Seattle Kraken, and Toronto Maple Leafs. A standout goaltender in junior with the Calgary Hitmen, Jones was named the Western Hockey League's goaltender of the year in the 2009–10 season and won a silver medal with Canada junior team at the 2010 World Junior Championships.

Jones started his professional career in the American Hockey League (AHL) with the Manchester Monarchs and made his NHL debut in 2013, where he spent two seasons with the Kings as backup to Jonathan Quick. In 2014, Jones won the Stanley Cup as a member of the Kings. Jones was traded to the Sharks in 2015, where he would serve as their starting goaltender for the next six seasons. He led the Sharks to the 2016 Stanley Cup Final, their first Cup Final appearance in franchise history, and was chosen to play in the 2017 NHL All-Star Game.

== Personal life ==
Jones was born in North Vancouver, British Columbia. His father, Harvey, is the Vice-President of Arena Operations with the Vancouver Canucks. He has a brother, Jordan, and a sister, Jocelyn. Jones felt that his father's position with the Canucks gave him some opportunities within the game that most other kids would not get. As a youth, he played in the 2003 Quebec International Pee-Wee Hockey Tournament with a minor ice hockey team from North Vancouver. He played midget level with the Vancouver Northwest Giants of the BC Hockey Major Midget League. Jones attended Handsworth Secondary School and played ice hockey at the North Shore Winter Club.

== Playing career ==
=== Junior ===
The Calgary Hitmen selected Jones in the fourth round of the 2005 WHL bantam draft. He joined the Hitmen in 2006–07 and served as the backup to Dan Spence for two seasons. He was eligible for the 2008 NHL entry draft but went undrafted. Offered a try-out with the Los Angeles Kings, Jones impressed team scouts at Los Angeles' rookie camp, and following a strong showing at their main camp, the team signed him to a three-year contract before reassigning him back to the Hitmen. He emerged as Calgary's starting goaltender in 2008–09; his 45 wins for the Hitmen broke the team record of 39. He led the league in wins, finished tied for the league lead in shutouts (7) and finished third in goals against average (2.08). He backstopped the Hitmen to 12 consecutive wins in the playoffs, tying a league record, before the Hitmen lost the WHL championship series in six games to the Kelowna Rockets. Following the season, he was named a Second Team All-Star in the Eastern Conference.

During the 2009–10 season with the Hitmen, Jones finished with a league-best GAA of 2.21 and was named a First Team All-Star in the Eastern Conference. In advance of his second consecutive appearance in the championship series, the league named him the winner of the Del Wilson Trophy as the WHL's top goaltender. During the season, he surpassed Spence's team record for career wins, and his 16 career shutouts are also a franchise record.

=== Professional ===
==== Los Angeles Kings ====
The Kings assigned Jones to their American Hockey League (AHL) affiliate, the Manchester Monarchs to begin the 2010–11 season. He also played with the Ontario Reign of the ECHL for a time, but after posting a 16–3–0 record, .939 save percentage and 1.93 GAA in his first 22 games for the Monarchs, Jones was chosen to play in the 2011 AHL All-Star Game. He was on the roster of the Los Angeles Kings as a spare when they won their first Stanley Cup, but did not play.

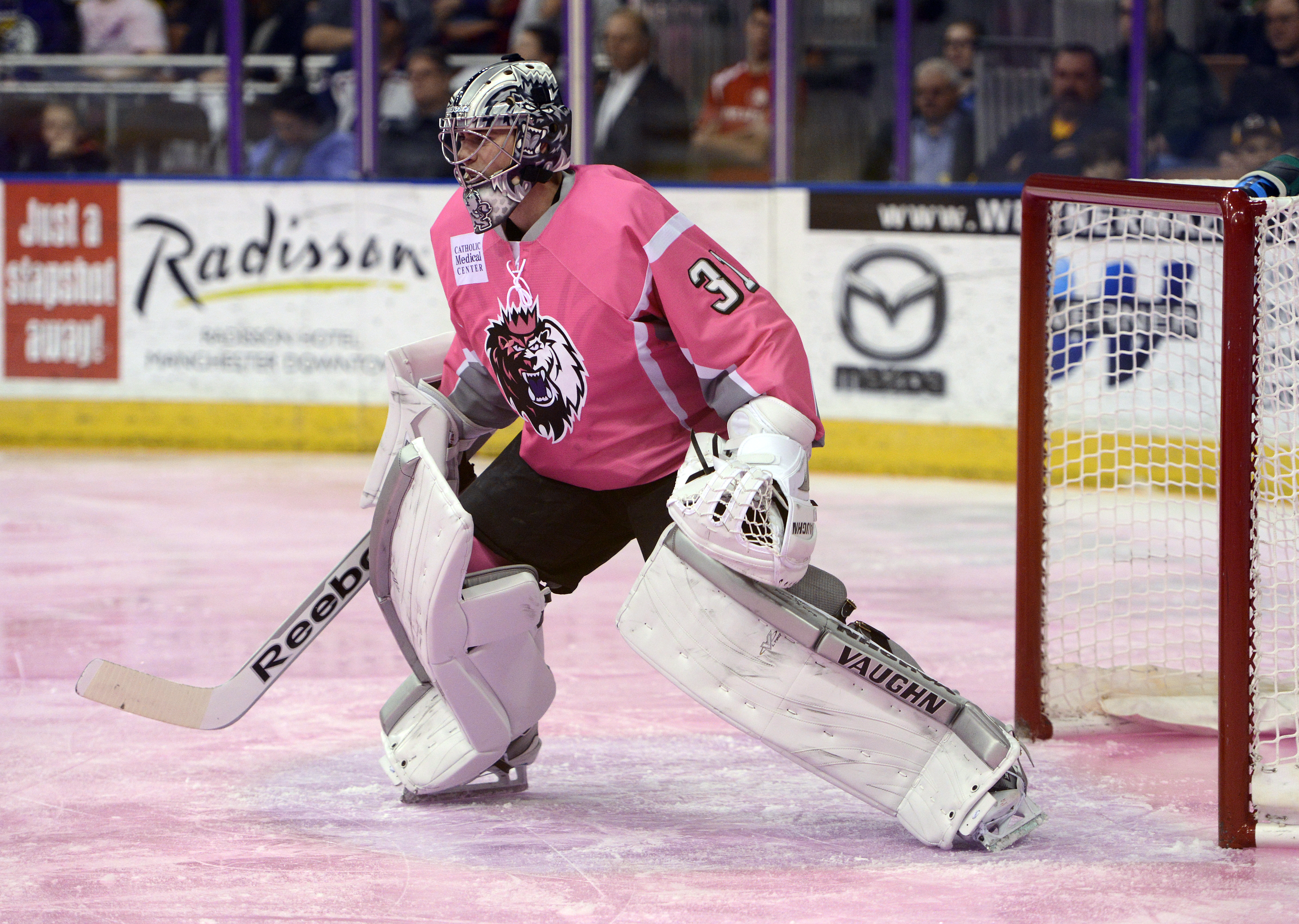
Jones with the Manchester Monarchs in February 2014.

Jones finished fourth in the AHL with 27 wins in 2012–13 and was also among the league leaders in games played (56) and shutouts (5). Jones began the 2013–14 season with Manchester, but was recalled by Los Angeles on November 13, 2013, after Jonathan Quick suffered an injury. As the backup for the Kings, he did not get into game action for three weeks. Jones made his NHL debut on December 3 and earned a 3–2 victory over the Anaheim Ducks. He stopped all nine shooters he faced in a shootout to secure his first NHL win. Jones won his second NHL start and made 16 saves to record his first NHL shutout four nights later against the New York Islanders. He shut out the Montreal Canadiens in his next game, making him the first Kings goaltender to do so, and the second Los Angeles rookie to record consecutive shutouts, matching Gerry Desjardins, who did it in 1968–69. Jones then found himself a full-time NHL goaltender for the first time after backup Ben Scrivens was traded to Edmonton, making Jones the team's primary backup to starter Quick.

==== San Jose Sharks ====
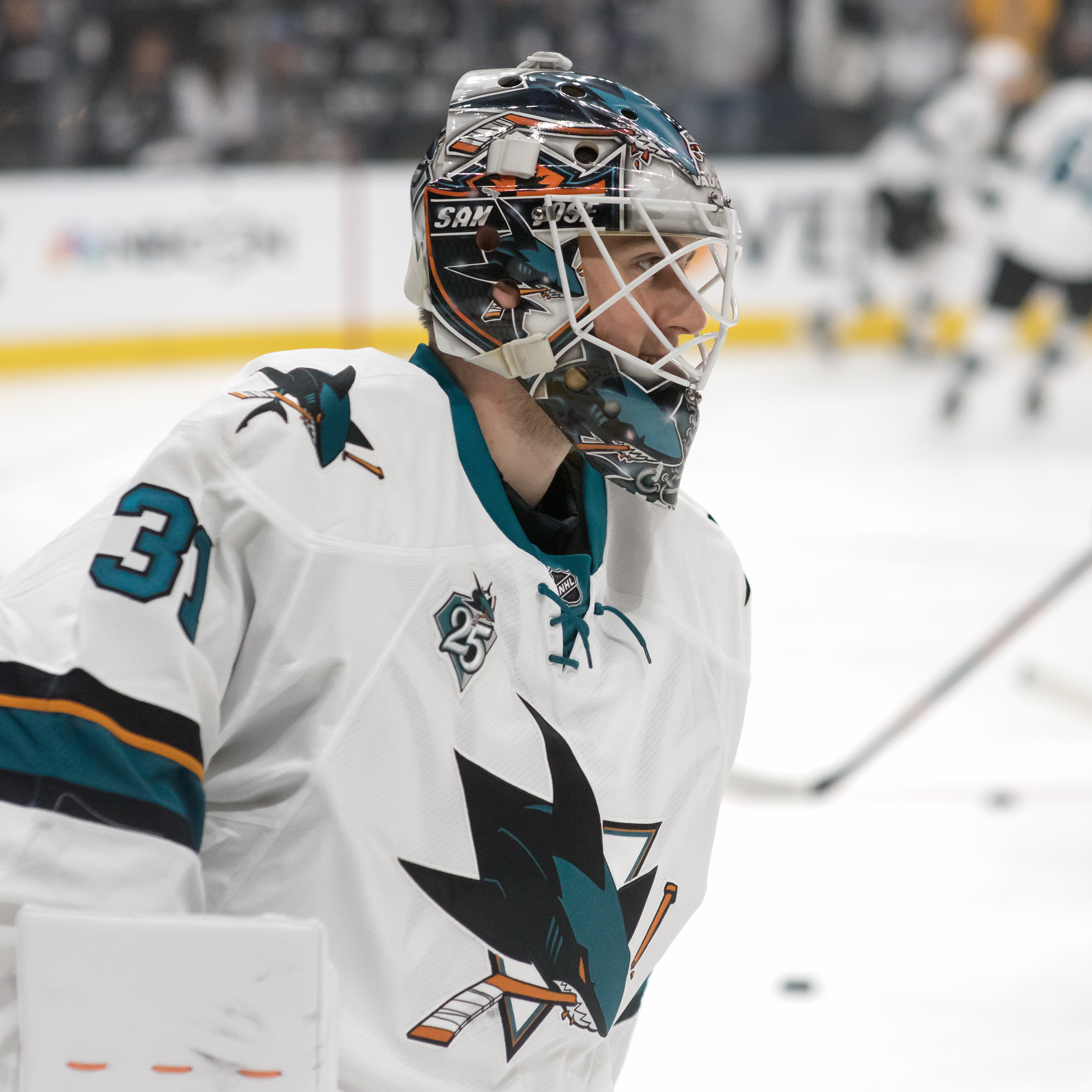
Jones during his tenure with the San Jose Sharks during the 2016 Stanley Cup playoffs

On June 26, 2015, Jones, set to become a restricted free agent on July 1, was traded to the Boston Bruins, along with Colin Miller and a 2015 first-round pick, in exchange for forward Milan Lucic. In turn, the Bruins traded Jones to the San Jose Sharks on June 30 in exchange for Sean Kuraly and a 2016 first-round pick. The Sharks signed him to a three-year contract worth $9 million.

Having his first season as a starting goaltender, Jones had 65 games in 2015–16 with the Sharks, finishing with a 2.27 goal-against average, .918 save percentage, and the second most shutouts in the regular season with six, next to Chicago Blackhawks netminder Corey Crawford with seven. Jones then helped the Sharks reach their first Stanley Cup Final, starting 24 playoff games and having shutouts in three of them.

On July 1, 2017, Jones signed a six-year, $34.5 million contract extension.

Jones had a difficult start to the 2019–20 season, dropping four games in a row before he was benched in favour of Aaron Dell. A six-game winning streak in November was snapped by a loss to the Edmonton Oilers, and even during this stretch, Jones maintained a .891 save percentage. On December 11, 2019, the Sharks fired DeBoer in favour of Bob Boughner, who wanted to give Dell more playing time. By the new year, Jones was rarely starting in goal for San Jose: between January 1 and February 13, he started only three games, during which he went 0–2–1 with 4.32 GAA and a .857 save percentage. He seemed to improve afterwards, going 4–4–0 with a 2.02 GAA and .927 save percentage in his last eight games before the NHL season was indefinitely suspended due to the COVID-19 pandemic. When the NHL announced that it would not finish the regular season, but would immediately begin the 2020 Stanley Cup playoffs using the 24 highest-ranked teams in the league, the Sharks, who had the worst record in the Western Conference, were not invited to the postseason.

Because the 2020–21 season was condensed into 56 games due to the ongoing effects of the COVID-19 pandemic, and the Sharks began with a stretch of eight games in 15 days, Boughner chose to platoon Jones and Devan Dubnyk to prevent either goaltender from overexertion. On February 11, however, an unspecified injury to Dubnyk forced Jones to take over as the primary goaltender for San Jose, with rookie Alexei Melnichuk called up from the AHL as his backup. After struggling in his first 12 starts, with a 6–5–1 record, 3.85 GAA, and .877 save percentage, Jones seemed to rebound in March, with an 8–2–1 record, 2.26 GAA, and .931 save percentage in his next 12 starts. The improvement was short-lived and hindered by poor defense from Sharks skaters. By May, the Sharks, who had already been eliminated from playoff contention, were no longer starting Jones in goal, preferring to use Melnichuk and Josef Kořenář instead. Jones played 34 games in the 2020–21 season, during which he went 15–13–4 with a 3.28 GAA, .896 SV%, and one shutout. On July 27, 2021, the Sharks bought out the remaining three years of his contract, allowing Jones to become an unrestricted free agent.

==== Philadelphia Flyers ====
A day later, on the opening of free agency, Jones was signed to a one-year, $2 million contract with the Philadelphia Flyers.

==== Seattle Kraken ====
On July 13, 2022, as a free agent from the Flyers, Jones inked a one-year, $2 million contract with the Seattle Kraken for the 2022–23 season.

Jones would earn his 200th career NHL win on October 21, 2022, against the defending Stanley Cup champion Colorado Avalanche, making one save in his appearance after entering the game in relief after injury to Philipp Grubauer.

==== Toronto Maple Leafs ====
As a free agent for the third consecutive off-season, Jones was signed to a one-year, $875,000 contract with the Toronto Maple Leafs on August 9, 2023. He attended the Maple Leafs 2023 training camp, but failed to make the team and was placed on waivers. After going unclaimed Jones was assigned to the Maple Leafs AHL affiliate, the Toronto Marlies, to start the 2023–24 season. He made his Leafs debut on December 7, 2023, in relief for Joseph Woll after Woll was injured following a save. Jones stopped nine of ten shots in relief en route to his first win as a Maple Leaf.

== Coaching career ==
On November 28, 2025, Jones was hired to serve as the goaltender coach for the Coquitlam Express of the British Columbia Hockey League (BCHL).

== International play ==
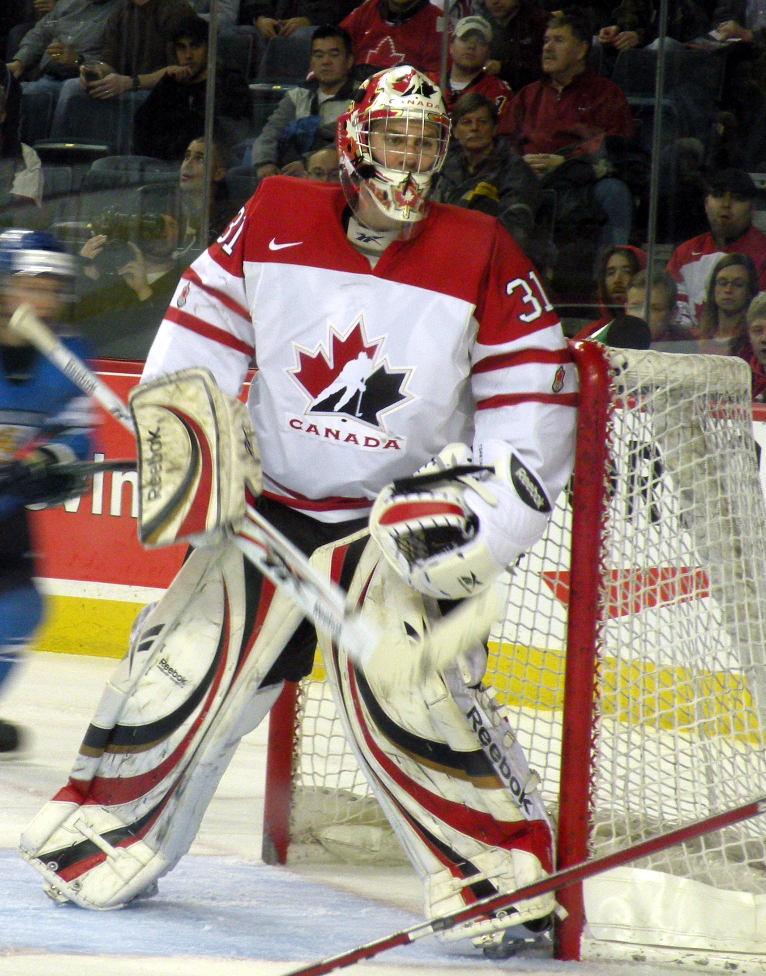
- Jones playing for the Canadian junior team in 2009.

Medal record

Men's ice hockey

Representing Canada

World Championships
Gold medal – first place	2015 Czech Republic	

World Junior Championships
Silver medal – second place	2010 Canada	

Jones was invited to participate in Canada junior team's summer camp, and earned a spot on the team as the backup to Jake Allen for the 2010 World Junior Championships. He started one preliminary round game against Slovakia, winning 8–2, and relieved Allen in the gold medal game against the United States, though Canada lost the game in overtime and ended the tournament with the silver medal.

== Career statistics ==
=== Regular season and playoffs ===
			Regular season									Playoffs
Season	Team	League	GP	W	L	OTL	MIN	GA	SO	GAA	SV%	GP	W	L	MIN	GA	SO	GAA	SV%
2006–07	Calgary Hitmen	WHL	18	9	4	3	1,059	52	0	3.03	.884	—	—	—	—	—	—	—	—
2007–08	Calgary Hitmen	WHL	27	18	8	1	1,529	54	1	2.12	.911	5	2	1	250	12	0	2.88	.879
2008–09	Calgary Hitmen	WHL	55	45	5	4	3,295	114	7	2.08	.915	18	14	4	1,095	34	2	1.86	.921
2009–10	Calgary Hitmen	WHL	48	36	11	1	2,851	105	8	2.21	.919	23	16	7	1,401	55	2	2.36	.915
2010–11	Ontario Reign	ECHL	1	1	0	0	64	4	0	3.76	.867	—	—	—	—	—	—	—	—
2010–11	Manchester Monarchs	AHL	39	23	12	1	2,187	82	4	2.25	.924	4	2	1	213	9	0	2.54	.921
2011–12	Manchester Monarchs	AHL	41	18	17	2	2,166	94	1	2.60	.919	3	1	1	155	6	0	2.33	.933
2012–13	Manchester Monarchs	AHL	56	27	25	4	3,347	141	5	2.53	.919	4	1	3	277	10	0	2.16	.932
2013–14	Manchester Monarchs	AHL	22	16	3	3	1,351	48	2	2.13	.928	—	—	—	—	—	—	—	—
2013–14	Los Angeles Kings	NHL	19	12	6	0	1,095	33	4	1.81	.934	2	0	0	56	0	0	0.00	1.000
2014–15	Los Angeles Kings	NHL	15	4	5	2	775	29	3	2.24	.906	—	—	—	—	—	—	—
2015–16	San Jose Sharks	NHL	65	37	23	4	3,786	143	6	2.27	.918	24	14	10	1,473	53	3	2.16	.923
2016–17	San Jose Sharks	NHL	65	35	23	6	3,800	152	2	2.40	.912	6	2	4	377	11	1	1.75	.935
2017–18	San Jose Sharks	NHL	60	30	22	6	3,416	145	4	2.55	.915	10	6	4	585	22	2	2.26	.928
2018–19	San Jose Sharks	NHL	62	36	19	5	3,597	176	3	2.94	.896	20	10	9	1,154	58	0	3.02	.898
2019–20	San Jose Sharks	NHL	41	17	21	2	2,360	118	2	3.00	.896	—	—	—	—	—	—	—	—
2020–21	San Jose Sharks	NHL	34	15	13	4	1,868	102	1	3.28	.896	—	—	—	—	—	—	—	—
2021–22	Philadelphia Flyers	NHL	35	12	18	3	1,998	114	0	3.42	.900	—	—	—	—	—	—	—	—
2022–23	Seattle Kraken	NHL	48	27	13	3	2,626	131	3	2.99	.887	1	0	0	19	0	0	0.00	1.000
2023–24	Toronto Marlies	AHL	5	2	1	1	267	15	1	3.37	.870	—	—	—	—	—	—	—	—
2023–24	Toronto Maple Leafs	NHL	22	11	8	1	1,170	56	2	2.87	.902	—	—	—	—	—	—	—	—
NHL totals			466	236	171	36	26,490	1,199	30	2.72	.905	63	32	27	3,664	144	6	2.36	.917

=== International ===
Year	Team	Tournament	Result	GP	Min	GA	SO	GAA	W	L	OTL	SV	SV%
2010	Canada	WJC	2nd place, silver medalist(s)	2	78	3	0	2.30	1	1	0	33	0.917
2015	Canada	WC	1st place, gold medalist(s)	2	120	3	1	1.50	2	0	0	35	0.921
Junior totals				2	78	3	0	2.30	1	1	0	33	0.917
Senior totals				2	120	3	1	1.50	2	0	0	35	0.921

== Awards and honours ==
Award	Year	Ref
CHL
WHL East Second All-Star Team	2008–09	
WHL East First All-Star Team	2009–10	
Del Wilson Trophy	2009–10	
WHL Playoff MVP	2009–10	
Hap Emms Memorial Trophy	2010	
CHL Memorial Cup All-Star Team	2010	
NHL
Stanley Cup champion	2014	
NHL All-Star Game	2017	

Awards and achievements
Preceded by Chet Pickard	Winner of the Del Wilson Trophy; 2010	Succeeded by Darcy Kuemper
