= Travis Hamonic =

Canadian ice hockey player (born 1990)

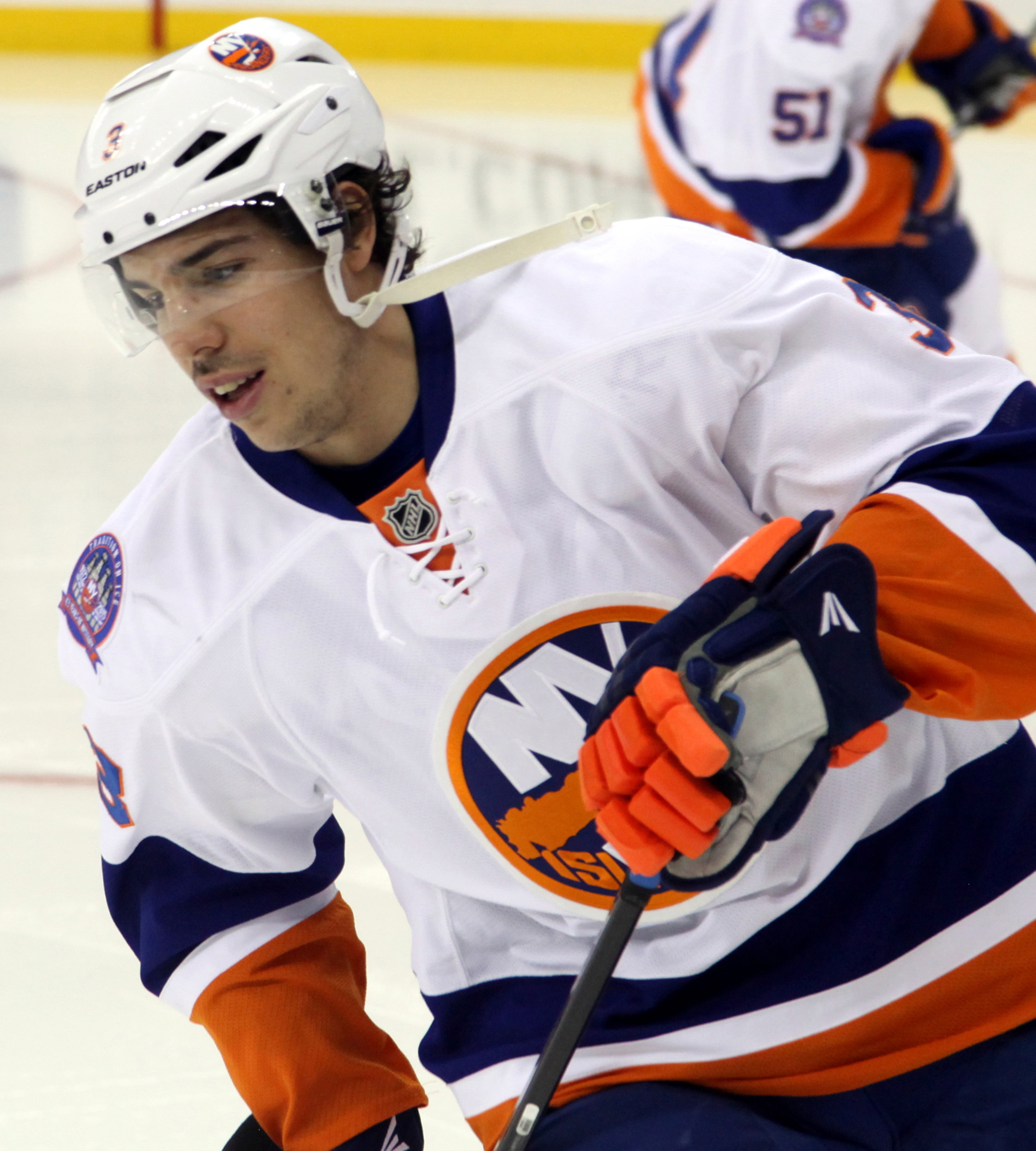
- Hamonic with the New York Islanders in 2015
- Born: August 16, 1990 (age 36) St. Malo, Manitoba, Canada
- Height: 6 ft 2 in (188 cm)
- Weight: 205 lb (93 kg; 14 st 9 lb)
- Position: Defence
- Shoots: Right
- NHL team Former teams: Free agent New York Islanders; Calgary Flames; Vancouver Canucks; Ottawa Senators; Detroit Red Wings
- NHL draft: 53rd overall, 2008; New York Islanders
- Playing career: 2010–present

Travis Hamonic (/ˈhæmənɪk/ HAM-ə-nik; born August 16, 1990) is a Canadian professional ice hockey player who is a defenceman and currently an unrestricted free agent. He most recently played for the Detroit Red Wings of the National Hockey League (NHL). He was drafted 53rd overall by the New York Islanders in the 2008 NHL entry draft. He also previously played for the Calgary Flames, Vancouver Canucks, and Ottawa Senators.

== Early life ==
Hamonic, who is of Metis ancestry, grew up on Hamonic Farms in Manitoba, mostly farming with his dad and, at the age of five, discovered ice hockey. When he was ten years old, his father Gerald died due to a major heart attack. A year after that, Hamonic and his family moved to Winnipeg, where he continued thriving at hockey. He said it was his getaway from the thoughts of losing his father. He grew up in a religious family and during his time with the Islanders, he wore number 3 as a sign of the Holy Trinity (although Hamonic wore number 36 during his rookie season with the Islanders and later number 24 with the Calgary Flames and number 27 with the Vancouver Canucks). ESPN2 series E:60 did a feature on Hamonic titled "In the Name of the Father," an inspirational segment on Hamonic's story.

== Playing career ==
=== Amateur ===
Hamonic was selected by the Moose Jaw Warriors of the Western Hockey League (WHL) in the ninth round of the 2005 WHL bantam draft. He started his major junior hockey career in the 2006–07 season, splitting time with the Winnipeg Saints of the Manitoba Junior Hockey League. He made 22 appearances for the Warriors, registering three assists and three points and 32 appearances for the Saints, scoring two goals, 13 assists for 15 points. In his first full season with the Warriors in 2007–08, he put up five goals and 22 points in the regular season as the Warriors made the WHL playoffs. In six playoff games he added one assist. In 2008–09 he improved offensively, scoring 13 goals and 40 points in 57 games. Prior to the 2009–10 WHL season Hamonic was named the co-captain of the Warriors alongside Jason Bast. In his final junior season, Hamonic was traded to the Brandon Wheat Kings on January 9, 2010. He played 39 games for the Warriors, scoring ten goals and 39 points before the trade. He missed time with a separated shoulder while playing for Canada's national junior team. He returned from injury and got into ten regular season games with Brandon, scoring one goal and five points. The Wheat Kings earned a spot in the 2010 Memorial Cup as hosts of the round-robin tournament which included the champions of the three Canadian major junior hockey leagues. Brandon advanced to the Memorial Cup final after upsetting the WHL champion Calgary Hitmen in the semifinal. They lost the final to the Ontario Hockey League champions, the Windsor Spitfires, 9–1. Hamonic appeared in six games in the tournament, scoring one goal and three points. He was named to the tournament all-star team.

=== Professional ===
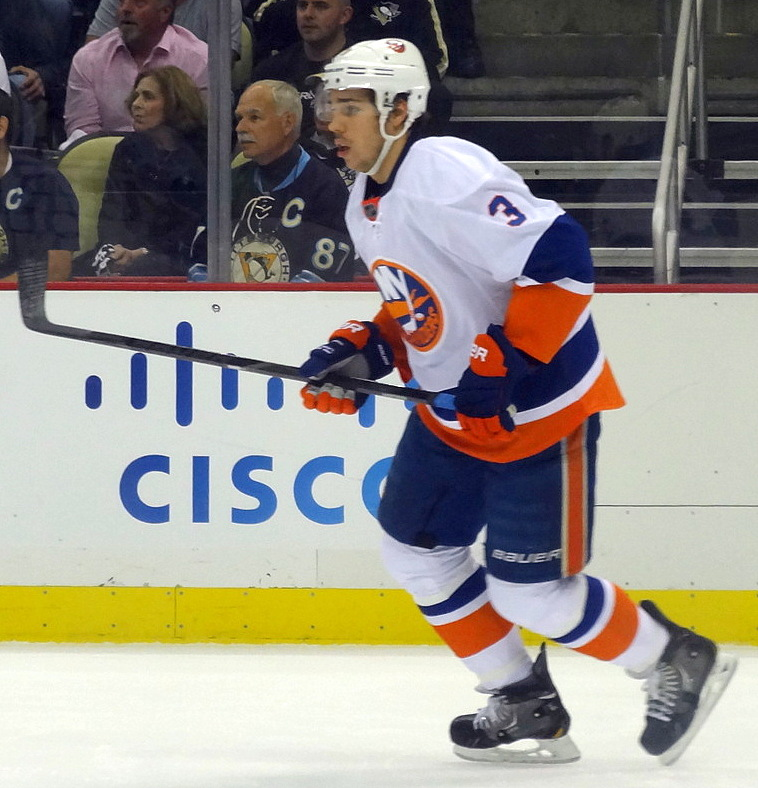
With the New York Islanders during the 2013 playoffs

==== New York Islanders ====
He was selected by the New York Islanders of the National Hockey League (NHL) in the second round, 53rd overall, of the 2008 NHL entry draft. Hamonic signed a three-year entry-level contract with the New York Islanders on May 26, 2010. On November 24, 2010, after spending 19 games in the American Hockey League (AHL) with the Islanders' top minor league affiliate, the Bridgeport Sound Tigers, Hamonic made his NHL debut, putting in a strong performance for New York, who ultimately lost in overtime against the Columbus Blue Jackets. He scored his first NHL goal on February 1, 2011, against Ondřej Pavelec of the Atlanta Thrashers. Hamonic finished his rookie season with a total of five goals and 26 points in 62 games in a top-four role with the Islanders.

In his first two NHL seasons, Hamonic was the only Islanders player to finish both seasons with a positive plus-minus rating. In the midst of the 2012–13 NHL lockout, Hamonic returned to the Islanders' affiliate in Bridgeport and posted ten points in 21 games. Following the 2012–13 shortened season, in which he helped the Islanders return to the Stanley Cup playoffs, Hamonic became a restricted free agent; he was rewarded with a seven-year, $27 million contract extension by the Islanders.

Early in the 2015–16 NHL season, it was revealed that Hamonic had requested a trade specifically to Western Canada due to family reasons. Islanders general manager Garth Snow had known since before the season started, however, was not able to find a deal that suited the Islanders' needs while accommodating Hamonic's request. After the playoffs, news broke that Hamonic had rescinded his trade request, expressing his desire to remain an Islander with the news that his family situation had "stabilized". On October 12, 2016, Hamonic was named as an alternate captain for the upcoming season. He was utilised as a defensive defenceman, often playing a shutdown role against the opposing teams' best forwards. On March 18, 2017, he broke a 34-game goalless drought when he scored in a 4–3 loss to the Columbus Blue Jackets.

==== Calgary Flames ====
On June 24, 2017, Hamonic was traded to the Calgary Flames along with a conditional fourth-round draft pick from the New York Islanders for a first-round draft pick (used on Noah Dobson) and two second-round draft picks in the 2018 NHL entry draft. With little cap space and a surplus of defencemen, the Islanders chose to move on from Hamonic to clear cap space. On April 23, 2018, Hamonic was nominated for the King Clancy Memorial Trophy as a player who best exemplifies leadership qualities on and off the ice and gives back to his community. During the 2017–18 season, he played alongside T. J. Brodie on the second defence pairing.

Following the Flames 2018–19 season opener loss to the Vancouver Canucks on October 3, 2018, Hamonic was placed on injured reserve to recover from a facial fracture following a fight with Erik Gudbranson. He was activated from injured reserve on October 25. On February 10, 2020, Hamonic was placed on injured reserve after suffering another injury versus the Vancouver Canucks. On March 19, the NHL paused the 2019–20 season due to the COVID-19 pandemic. On July 10, 2020, Hamonic announced he opted-out of the 2020 Stanley Cup playoffs due to concerns surrounding the COVID-19 pandemic after the NHL made plans to finish the season. He finished the season with three goals and twelve points in 50 games.

==== Vancouver Canucks ====
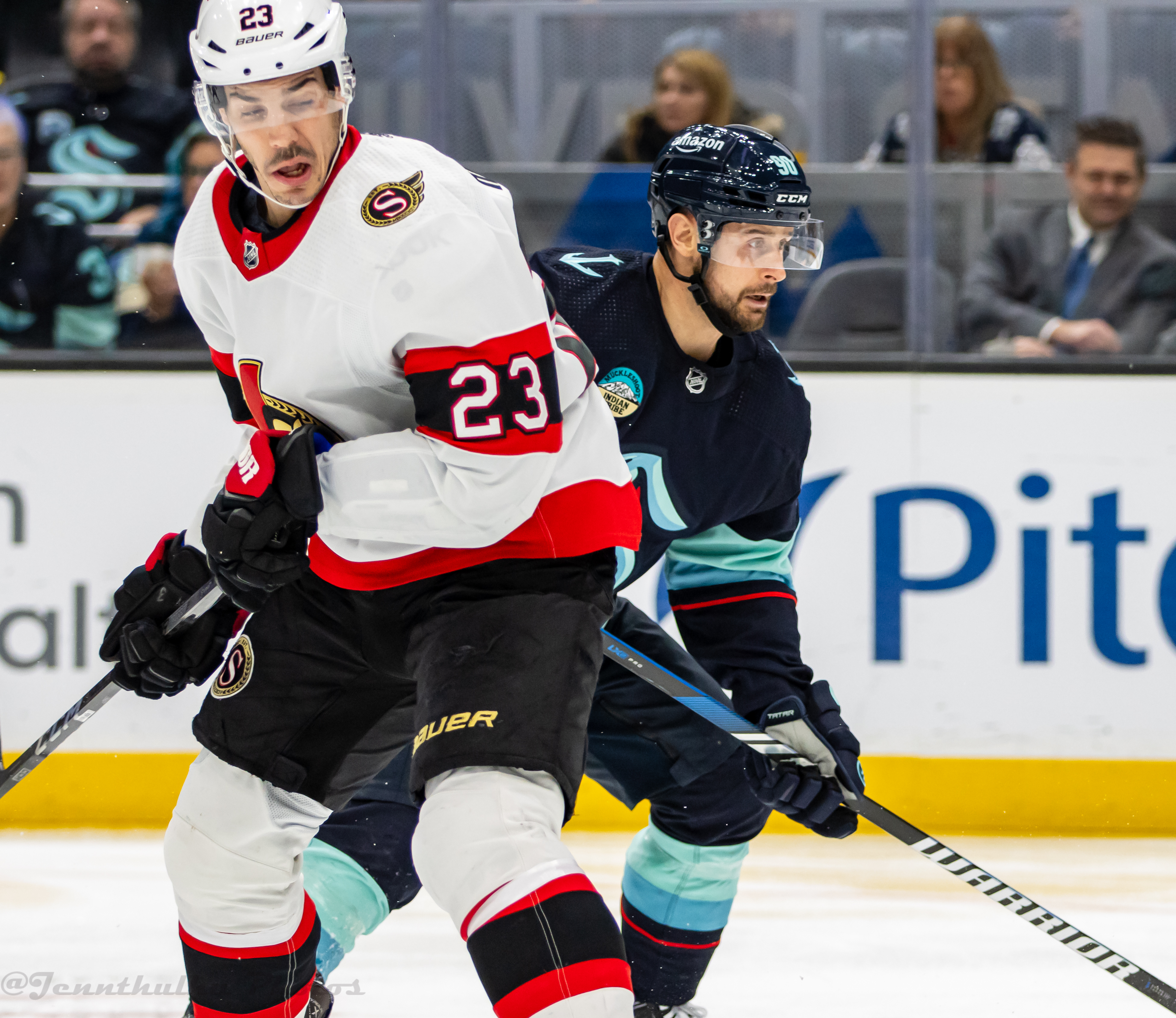
Hamonic and Tomáš Tatar of the Seattle Kraken in 2024

As an unrestricted free agent from the Flames, Hamonic remained un-signed entering training camp for the delayed 2020–21 season. On January 4, 2021, he agreed to an invitation to attend the Vancouver Canucks training camp on a professional tryout basis. Nearing the conclusion of camp, Hamonic agreed to a one-year, $1.25 million contract with the Canucks on January 12, 2021. By this point in his career he was considered a great shot blocker, good on the penalty kill and a good person for the chemistry of the team. However, he was no longer a top-four defenceman, with the Canucks using him on the third pairing and to provide depth for the team. In 38 games that season, he registered three goals and ten points. In the off-season, Hamonic was re-signed by the Canucks to a two-year contract extension.

During the 2021–22 season, Hamonic was given leave of absence from the Canucks to deal with personal matters. He had failed to report to training camp. On October 10, he was placed on waivers, but was not claimed. Hamonic was assigned to the Canucks AHL affiliate, the Abbotsford Canucks on October 11. He was recalled by Vancouver on December 3, 2021. He played in 24 games with the Canucks scoring three goals and seven points.

==== Ottawa Senators ====
On March 20, 2022, the Canucks traded Hamonic to the Ottawa Senators in exchange for a 2022 third-round pick. He played in 19 games to finish the season with the Senators. During the 2022–23 season Hamonic played in 75 games with the Senators, registering six goals and 21 points. He spent most of his ice time paired with rookie Jake Sanderson. Following the end of the season, Hamonic re-signed with Ottawa to a two-year $2.2 million contract. In the 2023–24 season, Hamonic was plagued by injuries. He appeared in just 48 games, scoring two goals and four assists. In the offseason he underwent minor knee surgery to correct things that had bothered him during the season.

==== Detroit Red Wings ====
After four seasons with the Senators, Hamonic left the organization as an unrestricted free agent and was signed to a one-year, $1 million contract with the Detroit Red Wings for the 2025–26 season on August 15, 2025. Hamonic saw limited playing time with Detroit, only appearing 26 games and not seeing a lot of ice time within those games. He registered two points in his gametime and played exclusively on the team's third defence pairing alongside Albert Johansson and Jacob Bernard-Docker.

== International play ==
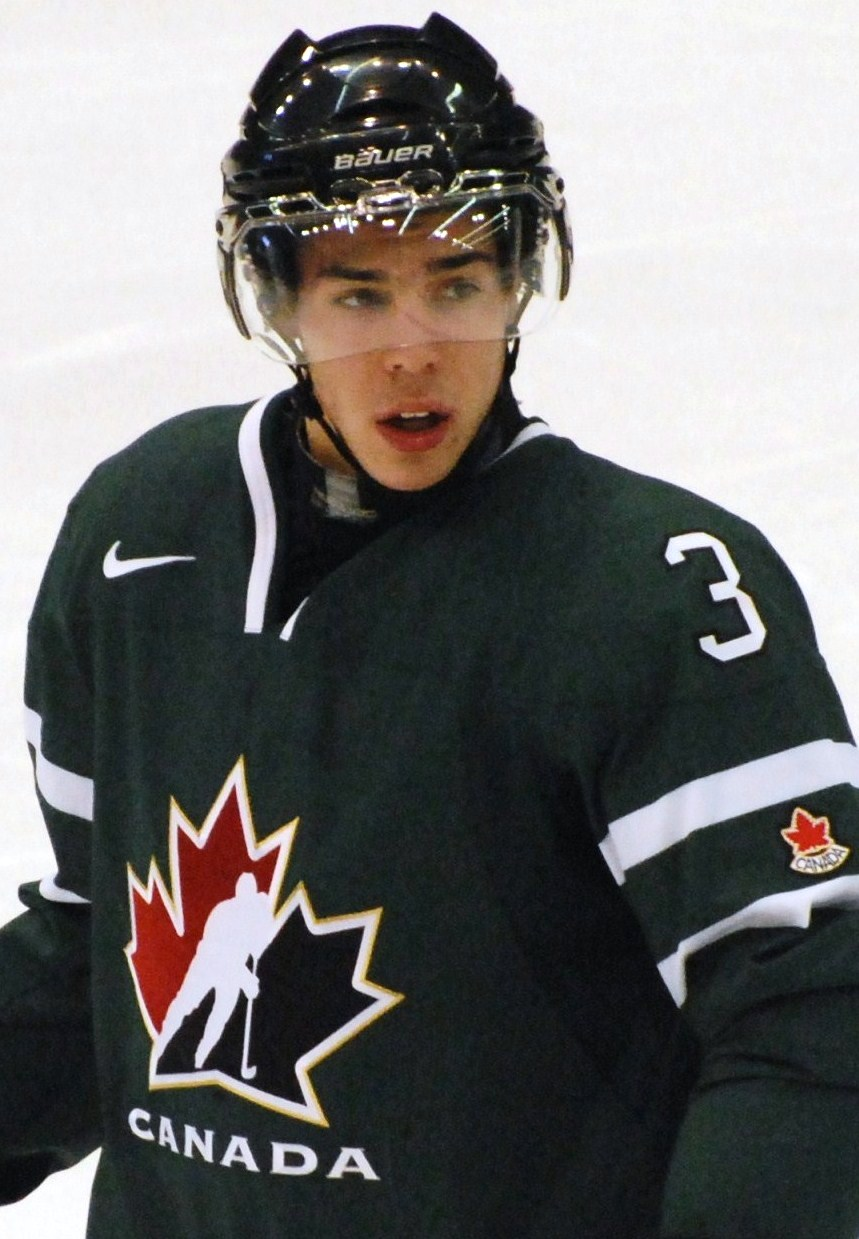
- Hamonic during a pre-tournament game for Canada in 2009

Medal record

Representing Canada

World Junior Championships
Silver medal – second place	2010 Saskatchewan	

IIHF World U18 Championships
Gold medal – first place	2008 Kazan	

Hamonic was selected to join Team Canada for the 2010 IIHF World Junior Championships. He was paired with Marco Scandella to form Canada's shutdown defence pairing in the tournament. Canada advanced to the semifinals and in their game versus Switzerland, he was checked from behind by Jeffrey Fuglister in the final minute of play. Canada won the game 6–1 and advanced to the final versus the United States. However, Hamonic suffered a separated shoulder on the play and missed the game, which Canada lost, earning the team a silver medal.

== Personal life ==
Hamonic and his wife, Stephanie, are active in many First Nations communities. During the 2016–17 off season, Hamonic worked with a television show called "Hit The Ice" to give assistance and exposure to young First Nations hockey prospects as they participated in a two-week NHL-format training camp for a chance to be seen by junior hockey scouts. Hamonic and his wife also take part in The Northern Project initiative which provides Indigenous children from the Northwest Territories, Nunavut and Yukon the opportunity to visit Calgary. At the conclusion of the 2016–17 season, Hamonic was awarded the Foundation Player Award for his D-Partner Program, where he invited children to games who had lost parents, a program which he continued in Calgary.

== Career statistics ==
=== Regular season and playoffs ===
			Regular season					Playoffs
Season	Team	League	GP	G	A	Pts	PIM	GP	G	A	Pts	PIM
2006–07	Winnipeg Saints	MJHL	32	2	13	15	62	—	—	—	—	—
2006–07	Moose Jaw Warriors	WHL	22	0	3	3	39	—	—	—	—	—
2007–08	Moose Jaw Warriors	WHL	61	5	17	22	101	6	0	1	1	6
2008–09	Moose Jaw Warriors	WHL	57	13	27	40	126	—	—	—	—	—
2009–10	Moose Jaw Warriors	WHL	31	10	29	39	48	—	—	—	—	—
2009–10	Brandon Wheat Kings	WHL	10	1	4	5	17	15	4	7	11	23
2010–11	Bridgeport Sound Tigers	AHL	19	2	5	7	45	—	—	—	—	—
2010–11	New York Islanders	NHL	62	5	21	26	103	—	—	—	—	—
2011–12	New York Islanders	NHL	73	2	22	24	73	—	—	—	—	—
2012–13	Bridgeport Sound Tigers	AHL	21	4	6	10	37	—	—	—	—	—
2012–13	New York Islanders	NHL	48	3	7	10	28	6	0	1	1	23
2013–14	New York Islanders	NHL	69	3	15	18	68	—	—	—	—	—
2014–15	New York Islanders	NHL	71	5	28	33	85	—	—	—	—	—
2015–16	New York Islanders	NHL	72	5	16	21	35	11	1	2	3	8
2016–17	New York Islanders	NHL	49	3	11	14	60	—	—	—	—	—
2017–18	Calgary Flames	NHL	74	1	10	11	79	—	—	—	—	—
2018–19	Calgary Flames	NHL	69	7	12	19	33	5	0	0	0	2
2019–20	Calgary Flames	NHL	50	3	9	12	27	—	—	—	—	—
2020–21	Vancouver Canucks	NHL	38	3	7	10	39	—	—	—	—	—
2021–22	Abbotsford Canucks	AHL	2	0	1	1	4	—	—	—	—	—
2021–22	Vancouver Canucks	NHL	24	3	4	7	6	—	—	—	—	—
2021–22	Ottawa Senators	NHL	19	1	2	3	8	—	—	—	—	—
2022–23	Ottawa Senators	NHL	75	6	15	21	71	—	—	—	—	—
2023–24	Ottawa Senators	NHL	48	2	4	6	40	—	—	—	—	—
2024–25	Ottawa Senators	NHL	59	1	6	7	19	—	—	—	—	—
2025–26	Detroit Red Wings	NHL	26	0	2	2	29	—	—	—	—	—
NHL totals			926	53	191	244	803	22	1	3	4	33

=== International ===
Year	Team	Event	Result	GP	G	A	Pts	PIM
2008	Canada	U18	1st place, gold medalist(s)	7	0	2	2	14
2010	Canada	WJC	2nd place, silver medalist(s)	6	1	2	3	0
Junior totals				13	1	4	5	14

== Awards and honours ==
Award	Year
CHL
Memorial Cup All-Star Team	2010
NHL
Foundation Player Award	2017
