= Ryley Miller =

Canadian ice hockey player

- Born: September 24, 1992 (age 32); Spruce Grove, Alberta, Canada
- Height: 6 ft 0 in (183 cm)
- Weight: 170 lb (77 kg; 12 st 2 lb)
- Position: Defence
- Shoots: Left
- ChHL team Former teams: Stony Plain Eagles; SK Horácká Slavia Třebíč (Czech2); Wheeling Nailers (ECHL); HC Kometa Brno (Czech Extraliga)
- NHL draft: Undrafted
- Playing career: 2013–present

Ryley Miller (born September 24, 1992) is a Canadian professional ice hockey defenceman. He currently plays for the Stony Plain Eagles of the Chinook Hockey League. Miller played the 2013-2014 season in the Czech Republic with SK Horácká Slavia Třebíč of the First National Hockey League.

Miller made his Czech Extraliga debut playing with HC Kometa Brno during the 2013–14 Czech Extraliga season. Miller is known for his tough game play style, oftentimes being penalized for his questionable hits, and notably an enforcer on his teams gathering many fighting major penalties throughout the course of a season.
