= Tyler Shattock =

Canadian ice hockey player (born 1990)

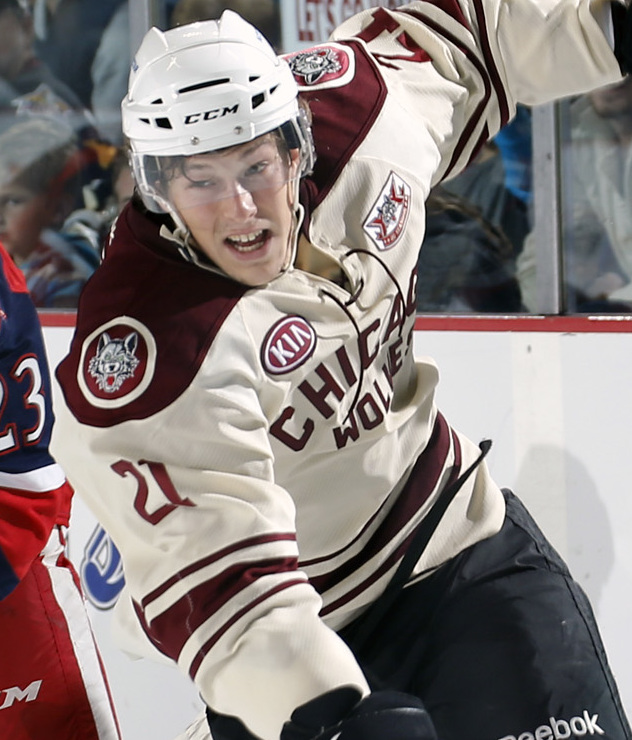
- Shattock with the Chicago Wolves in 2013
- Born: February 10, 1990 (age 36) Salmon Arm, BC, Canada
- Height: 6 ft 3 in (191 cm)
- Weight: 205 lb (93 kg; 14 st 9 lb)
- Position: Right wing
- Shot: Right
- Played for: Peoria Rivermen; Chicago Wolves; Worcester Sharks; Braehead Clan
- NHL draft: 108th overall, 2009; St. Louis Blues
- Playing career: 2010–2018

Tyler Shattock (born February 10, 1990) is a former Canadian professional ice hockey player. He last played for the Braehead Clan of the Elite Ice Hockey League in the United Kingdom. He was selected by the St. Louis Blues in the 4th round (108th overall) of the 2009 NHL entry draft.

== Playing career ==
Before turning professional, Shattock played major junior hockey in the Western Hockey League for the Kamloops Blazers and Calgary Hitmen. On May 13, 2010, Shattock was signed by the St. Louis Blues to a three-year entry-level contract. Shattock spent his tenure with the Blues playing for their AHL affiliate, first the Peoria Rivermen and then the Chicago Wolves. Following the 2013-14 season, the Blues did not tender a qualifying offer to Shattock, and on July 1, 2014, he became an unrestricted free agent.

On September 8, 2014, the Stockton Thunder of the ECHL announced they had signed Shattock. In the 2014–15 season, Shattock broke out offensively with the Thunder to enjoy his most successful season with 63 points from 65 games. He was loaned to the Worcester Sharks of the AHL for 3 games.

On September 22, 2015, with the Thunder relocating, Shattock signed as a free agent to remain in the ECHL with the Kalamazoo Wings. During the 2016–17 season, his second as Captain with the Wings and having contributed with 23 points in 37 games, Shattock was traded by Kalamazoo to the Alaska Aces in exchange for Justin Breton on January 17, 2017.

On 21 August 2017, Shattock moved to Scotland to sign for EIHL side, Braehead Clan.

== Career statistics ==
			Regular season					Playoffs
Season	Team	League	GP	G	A	Pts	PIM	GP	G	A	Pts	PIM
2005–06	Kamloops Blazers	WHL	2	0	1	1	2	—	—	—	—	—
2006–07	Kamloops Blazers	WHL	58	7	9	16	51	4	0	0	0	0
2007–08	Kamloops Blazers	WHL	48	9	14	23	45	4	1	1	2	4
2008–09	Kamloops Blazers	WHL	68	30	39	69	82	4	0	1	1	6
2009–10	Kamloops Blazers	WHL	42	22	28	50	65	—	—	—	—	—
2009–10	Calgary Hitmen	WHL	30	8	20	28	26	21	5	12	17	24
2010–11	Peoria Rivermen	AHL	67	3	12	15	60	4	0	0	0	4
2011–12	Peoria Rivermen	AHL	65	7	8	15	20	—	—	—	—	—
2012–13	Peoria Rivermen	AHL	62	4	8	12	23	—	—	—	—	—
2012–13	Evansville IceMen	ECHL	3	3	2	5	2	—	—	—	—	—
2013–14	Chicago Wolves	AHL	61	6	14	20	38	9	1	1	2	7
2014–15	Stockton Thunder	ECHL	65	23	40	63	101	—	—	—	—	—
2014–15	Worcester Sharks	AHL	3	0	0	0	10	—	—	—	—	—
2015–16	Kalamazoo Wings	ECHL	59	14	21	35	34	—	—	—	—	—
2016–17	Kalamazoo Wings	ECHL	37	7	16	23	16	—	—	—	—	—
2016–17	Alaska Aces	ECHL	35	7	9	16	23	—	—	—	—	—
2017–18	Braehead Clan	EIHL	39	10	18	28	34	—	—	—	—	—
AHL totals			258	20	42	62	151	13	1	1	2	11
