= Alexander Urbom =

Swedish ice hockey player

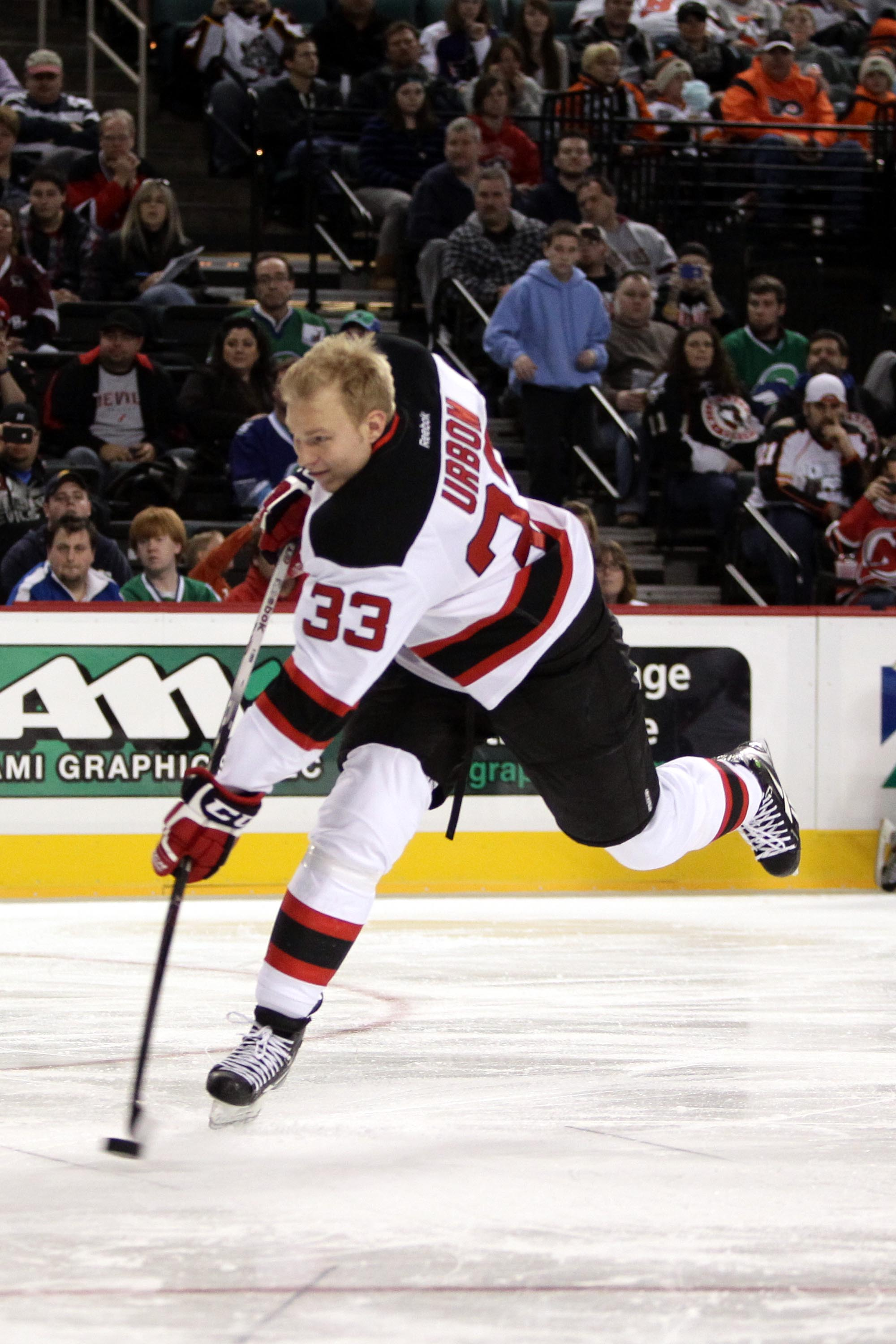
- Urbom with the Albany Devils in 2012
- Born: December 20, 1990 (age 35) Stockholm, Sweden
- Height: 6 ft 4 in (193 cm)
- Weight: 205 lb (93 kg; 14 st 9 lb)
- Position: Defence
- Shoots: Left
- ICEHL team Former teams: EC Red Bull Salzburg; Djurgårdens IF; New Jersey Devils; Washington Capitals; Severstal Cherepovets; Skellefteå AIK; Düsseldorfer EG
- NHL draft: 73rd overall, 2009; New Jersey Devils
- Playing career: 2008–present

Alexander Urbom (born December 20, 1990) is a Swedish professional ice hockey defenceman. He is currently playing with EC Red Bull Salzburg of the ICE Hockey League (ICEHL).

== Playing career ==
Urbom was drafted by the New Jersey Devils in the third round, 73rd overall, in the 2009 NHL Draft. He previously played for Djurgårdens IF in Elitserien and Brandon Wheat Kings in the WHL.

He scored his first NHL goal on April 10, 2011, against Tuukka Rask of the Boston Bruins.

Urbom was claimed off waivers to start the 2013–14 season by the Washington Capitals on October 3, 2013. After appearing in 20 games throughout the first half of the season with the Capitals, Urbom returned on waivers to be reacquired by the Devils on January 8, 2014.

After four seasons in North America, Urbom opted to leave as a restricted free agent, signing a two-year contract with Russian club Severstal Cherepovets of the KHL on June 6, 2014. After one season in the KHL, Urbom opted to return to the SHL, signing with Skellefteå AIK.

He returned to his original club, Djurgårdens IF, on loan from Skellefteå AIK in the second year of his two-year contract.

After three seasons in his second spell with DIF, Urbom left Sweden as a free agent following the 2018–19 season, signing a one-year contract with German club, Düsseldorfer EG of the Deutsche Eishockey Liga (DEL), on May 7, 2019.

As a free agent in the 2020–21 season, Urbom was belatedly signed for the remainder of the season with Austrian club, EC Red Bull Salzburg of the ICE Hockey League, on February 16, 2021.

== Career statistics ==
			Regular season					Playoffs
Season	Team	League	GP	G	A	Pts	PIM	GP	G	A	Pts	PIM
2007–08	Djurgårdens IF	J20	39	3	8	11	54	7	0	1	1	2
2008–09	Djurgårdens IF	SEL	28	0	0	0	2	—	—	—	—	—
2008–09	Djurgårdens IF	J20	16	5	6	11	45	—	—	—	—	—
2009–10	Brandon Wheat Kings	WHL	66	12	21	33	87	15	4	3	7	17
2010–11	New Jersey Devils	NHL	8	1	0	1	0	—	—	—	—	—
2010–11	Albany Devils	AHL	72	2	21	23	64	—	—	—	—	—
2011–12	Albany Devils	AHL	50	2	10	12	33	—	—	—	—	—
2011–12	New Jersey Devils	NHL	5	1	0	1	9	—	—	—	—	—
2012–13	Albany Devils	AHL	68	0	8	8	64	—	—	—	—	—
2012–13	New Jersey Devils	NHL	1	0	0	0	0	—	—	—	—	—
2013–14	Washington Capitals	NHL	20	1	1	2	19	—	—	—	—	—
2013–14	Albany Devils	AHL	35	1	10	11	26	3	0	0	0	0
2014–15	Severstal Cherepovets	KHL	56	1	7	8	34	—	—	—	—	—
2015–16	Skellefteå AIK	SHL	47	0	6	6	75	13	0	1	1	6
2016–17	Djurgårdens IF	SHL	51	0	10	10	95	3	0	1	1	6
2017–18	Djurgårdens IF	SHL	38	1	1	2	24	11	0	3	3	0
2018–19	Djurgårdens IF	SHL	44	1	4	5	22	14	0	0	0	2
2019–20	Düsseldorfer EG	DEL	36	3	3	6	12	—	—	—	—	—
SHL totals			208	2	21	23	218	41	0	5	5	14
NHL totals			34	3	1	4	28	—	—	—	—	—
