= 2004 Memorial Cup =

Canadian junior men's ice hockey championship

Tournament details
- Venue(s): Prospera Place; Kelowna, British Columbia
- Dates: May 15–23, 2004
- Teams: 4
- Host team: Kelowna Rockets (WHL)
- TV partner: Rogers Sportsnet

Final positions
- Champions: Kelowna Rockets (WHL) (1st title)
- Runners-up: Gatineau Olympiques (QMJHL)

Tournament statistics
- Games played: 8
- Attendance: 50,078 (6,260 per game)
- Scoring leader: Doug O'Brien (Knights) (8 points)

Awards
- MVP: Kelly Guard (Rockets)

The Memorial Cup trophy

The 2004 Memorial Cup (branded as the 2004 Mastercard Memorial Cup for sponsorship reasons) occurred May 15–23 at Prospera Place in Kelowna, British Columbia. It was the 86th annual Memorial Cup competition and determined the major junior ice hockey champion of the Canadian Hockey League (CHL). It featured the host team, the Kelowna Rockets as well as the winners of the Ontario Hockey League, Quebec Major Junior Hockey League and the Western Hockey League which were the Guelph Storm, Gatineau Olympiques and the Medicine Hat Tigers respectively. The Kelowna Rockets would be the eventual winners, and would become only the fourth host team to win without winning their league as well. (The first time was in 1983, when the Portland Winter Hawks won it, the second was in 1993 when the Sault Ste. Marie Greyhounds won it, and the third was in 1999 when the Ottawa 67's won it.) Kelowna defeated the Olympiques who made their second straight Memorial Cup final, but as with 2003, the 'Piques came up short. Kelowna also participated in the 2003 tournament as WHL champions but did not advance to the final, and would participate as WHL champions in the 2005 Memorial Cup as well.

== Round-robin standings ==
Pos	Team	Pld	W	L	GF	GA	Pts
1	Kelowna Rockets (host)	3	3	0	7	2	6
2	Gatineau Olympiques (QMJHL)	3	2	1	11	7	4
3	Medicine Hat Tigers (WHL)	3	1	2	4	6	2
4	Guelph Storm (OHL)	3	0	3	3	10	0

== Schedule ==
All times local (UTC -8)

=== Round-robin ===
May 15, 2004

Kelowna	1–0	Guelph

Prospera Place, Kelowna
Attendance:6,350

May 16, 2004

Medicine Hat	1-3	Gatineau

Prospera Place, Kelowna
Attendance:6,153

May 17, 2004

Kelowna	4–1	Gatineau

Prospera Place, Kelowna
Attendance:6,250

May 18, 2004

Medicine Hat	2–1	Guelph

Prospera Place, Kelowna
Attendance:6,127

May 19, 2004

Gatineau	7–2	Guelph

Prospera Place, Kelowna
Attendance:6,150

May 20, 2004

Kelowna	2–1	Medicine Hat

Prospera Place, Kelowna
Attendance:6,350

=== Semi-final ===
May 22, 2004

Gatineau	6–5	Medicine Hat

Prospera Place, Kelowna
Attendance:6,151

=== Final ===
May 23, 2004

Kelowna	2–1	Gatineau

Prospera Place, Kelowna
Attendance: 6,636

== Winning team ==
Michal Blanar, Troy Bodie, Mike Card, Blake Comeau, Ryan Constant, Kyle Cumiskey, Darren Deschamps, Simon Ferguson, Randall Gelech, Josh Gorges, Kelly Guard, Joel Henituik, Brent Howarth, Justin Keller, D. J. King, Josh Lepp, Joni Lindlof, Tyler Mosienko, Mark Olafson, Cam Paddock, Brett Palin, Chris Ray, Kevin Reinholt, Tyler Spurgeon, Stephen Sunderman, Stewart Thiessen, Patrik Valcak, Nolan Waker, Shea Weber, Derek Yeomans. Coach: Marc Habscheid

== Scoring leaders ==
1. Doug O'Brien, GAT (3g, 5a, 8pts)
2. Jean-Michel Daoust, GAT (1g, 6a, 7pts)
3. Nick Fugere, GAT (4g, 1a, 5pts)
4. Yanick Seidenberg, MH (1g, 4a, 5pts)
5. Randall Gelech, KEL (3g, 1a, 4pts)
6. Chris St. Jacques, MH (3g, 1a, 4pts)
7. Clarke MacArthur, MH (1g, 3a, 4pts)
8. Cam Paddock, KEL (1g, 3a, 4pts)
9. Shea Weber, KEL (1g, 3a, 4pts)

== Goaltending leaders ==
1. Kelly Guard, KEL (0.75gaa, .971sv%)
2. Kevin Nastiuk, MH (2.77gaa, .888sv%)
3. David Tremblay, GAT (2.94gaa, .897sv%)
4. Adam Dennis, GUE (3.00gaa, .848sv%)

== Award winners ==
- Stafford Smythe Memorial Trophy (MVP): Kelly Guard, Kelowna
- George Parsons Trophy (Sportsmanship): Josh Gorges, Kelowna
- Hap Emms Memorial Trophy (Goaltender): Kelly Guard, Kelowna
- Ed Chynoweth Trophy (Leading Scorer): Doug O'Brien, Gatineau

All-star team

- Goal: Kelly Guard, Kelowna
- Defence: Doug O'Brien, Gatineau; Shea Weber, Kelowna
- Forwards: Jean-Michel Daoust, Gatineau; Clarke MacArthur, Medicine Hat; Randall Gelech, Kelowna
