= Gregory Campbell (ice hockey) =

Canadian ice hockey player, executive (born 1983)

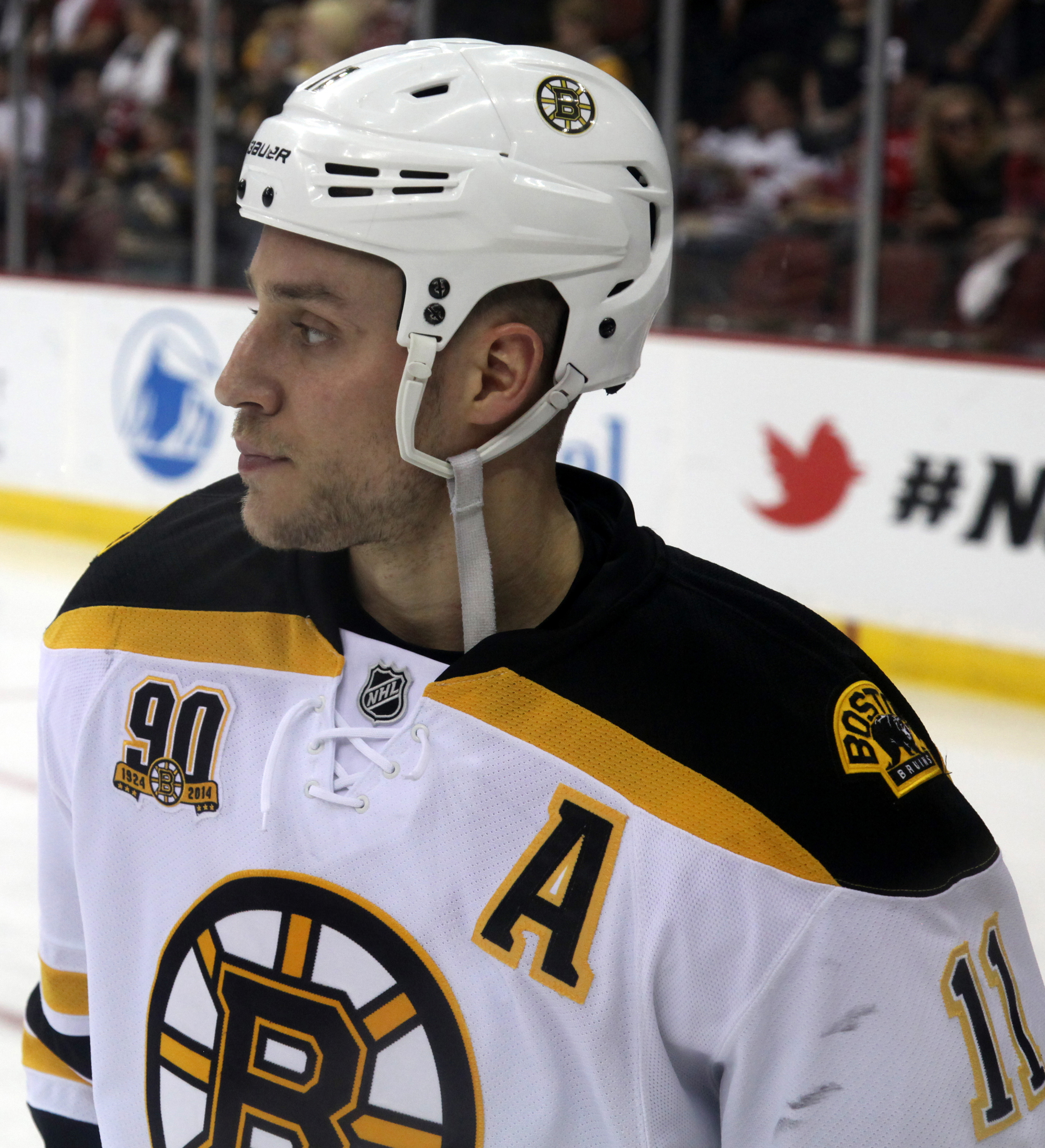
- Campbell with the Boston Bruins in April 2014
- Born: December 17, 1983 (age 42) London, Ontario, Canada
- Height: 6 ft 0 in (183 cm)
- Weight: 197 lb (89 kg; 14 st 1 lb)
- Position: Centre
- Shot: Left
- Played for: Florida Panthers; Boston Bruins; Columbus Blue Jackets
- NHL draft: 67th overall, 2002; Florida Panthers
- Playing career: 2003–2016

Gregory James Campbell (born December 17, 1983) is a Canadian former professional ice hockey centre and current Assistant General Manager of the Florida Panthers. He was drafted by the Panthers in the third round, 67th overall, in the 2002 NHL entry draft. Campbell is the son of former NHL player and current NHL Director of Hockey Operations Colin Campbell.

== Playing career ==
=== Amateur ===
Born in London, Ontario, Campbell grew up in nearby Tillsonburg, playing the majority of his minor hockey with the Tillsonburg Tornados BB teams of the OMHA Southern Counties League and the AAA Elgin-Middlesex Chiefs of the Alliance Pavilion League until Minor Bantam. He played in the 1996 Quebec International Pee-Wee Hockey Tournament with the New York Rangers minor ice hockey team.

Campbell was drafted by the Plymouth Whalers in the sixth round, 102nd overall, in the 1999 OHL Bantam Supplemental Draft after playing the 1998–99 season with the Aylmer Aces Jr.B. club.

Campbell was traded by Plymouth on August 2, 2002, to the Kitchener Rangers, along with a third-round draft pick, in exchange for Ryan Ramsey, Gary Klapowski and a second-round pick. According to the Rangers, Campbell was brought in to "fill the need for a strong forward to park in the crease area to play alongside Derek Roy on the Rangers top unit and especially on the powerplay, filling a gap left by graduating power forwards Jeff Szwez and John Osborne, who combined for 42 goals for the Rangers last season."

Campbell was a late invitee to the World Junior Championships camp, joining Rangers teammates Steve Eminger and Derek Roy at the camp. Campbell, along with Roy and Eminger (as well as former Bruins teammate Daniel Paille), was ultimately selected to play for Team Canada at the 2003 World Junior Championships, where they won the silver medal, falling to Russia in the tournament final.

Through 55 games for Kitchener, Campbell racked up 23 goals and 33 assists for 56 points playing alongside Derek Roy. In 21 playoff games, Campbell scored 15 goals and picked up four assists for 19 points with 34 penalties in minutes, leading his team to contend for the Memorial Cup in 2003. Campbell recorded one goal and six assists for seven points in four games in the tournament. He was named to the Memorial Cup All-Star Team along with Derek Roy, Mike Richards, Steve Eminger, Doug O'Brien and Scott Dickie. Campbell was also awarded the Ed Chynoweth Trophy as the tournament's leading scorer and the George Parsons Trophy as the most sportsmanlike player.

=== Professional (2003–2016) ===
==== Florida Panthers (2003–2010) ====
Campbell was drafted 67th overall by the Florida Panthers in the 2002 NHL entry draft. He played two NHL games in 2003–04, but did not register a point in the contests. He scored his first goal in the 2005–06 NHL season in a 4–3 loss to the Montreal Canadiens against goaltender Yann Danis.

==== Boston Bruins (2010–2015) ====
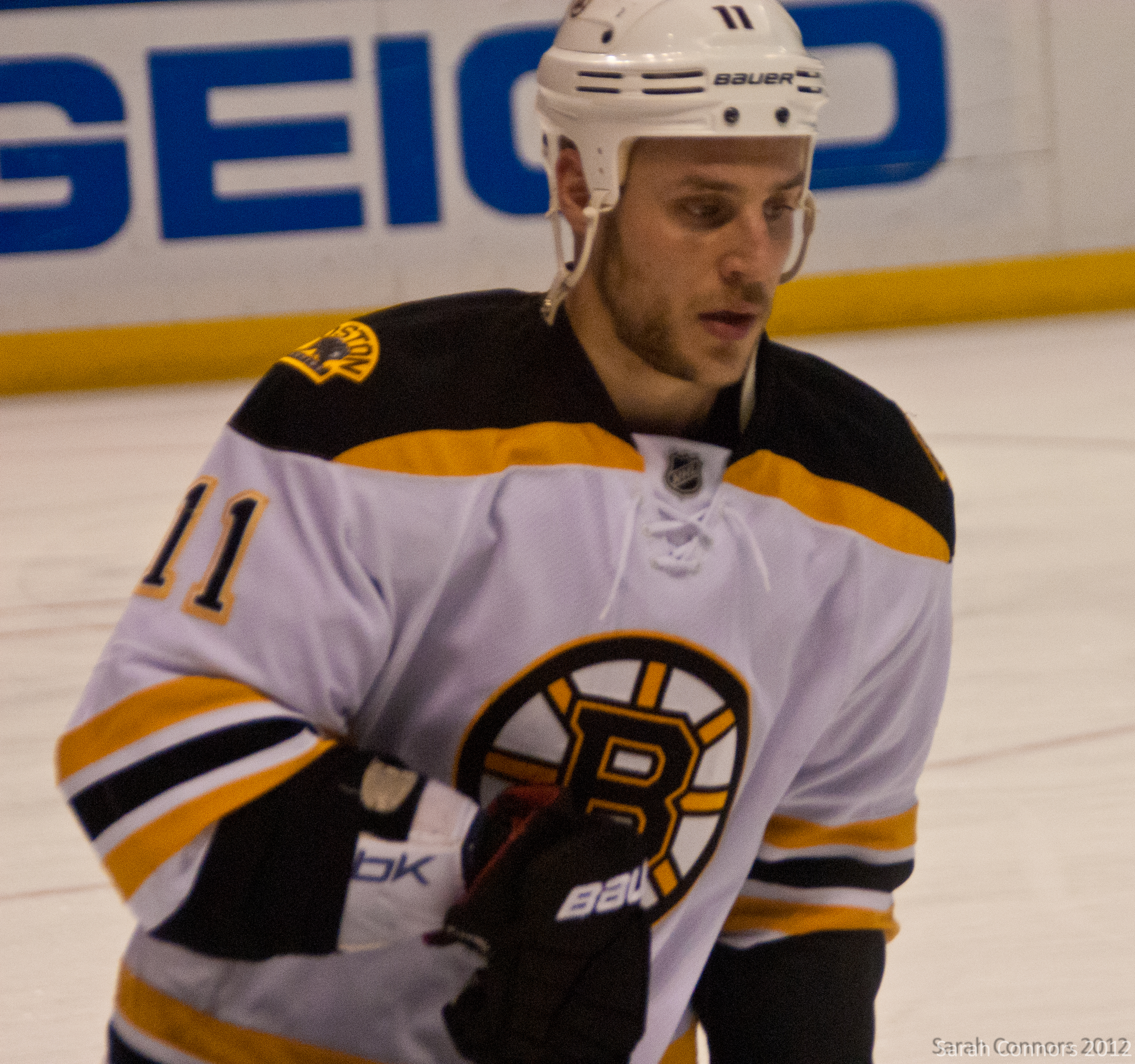
Campbell in February 2012.

On June 22, 2010, Campbell was traded by the Panthers, along with Nathan Horton, to the Boston Bruins in exchange for Dennis Wideman and a first-round draft pick (15th overall) in 2010 and a third-round pick in 2011.

In the 2010–11 season, Campbell set a career high in penalty minutes (93) and tied for a career high in goals (13). During the 2011 Stanley Cup playoffs, he centred the Bruins' top penalty killing unit, which notably neutralized the potent Vancouver Canucks' power play in the Stanley Cup Final, limiting them to just two power play goals through the seven-game series. On June 15, 2011, Campbell won the Stanley Cup with the Bruins. At the end of the next off-season, on June 12, 2012, he re-signed a three-year, $4.8 million contract extension.

On June 5, 2013, during Game 3 of the Eastern Conference Finals, Campbell suffered a broken right fibula after throwing himself in front of an Evgeni Malkin slapshot during a crucial penalty kill against the Pittsburgh Penguins. Campbell regained his footing, however, and despite being unable to put any pressure on his right leg, he remained on the ice for more than a minute. In doing so, he helped kill off the Penguins power play before painstakingly skating himself to the bench. While Campbell exited the Ice, Bruins fans were heard to be chanting "Campbell, Campbell!" in support of the beloved Bruin. The Bruins went on to win the game 2–1 in double overtime, ultimately progressing to the Final against the Chicago Blackhawks. They would lose to Chicago in six games, but Campbell did not play any in any Finals games due to his injury.

Despite concerns, Campbell was ready to go for the 2013–14 season opener for the Bruins. Campbell stayed in his usual role, centering the fourth line (nicknamed the Merlot Line) between Daniel Paille and Shawn Thornton. Campbell would play in all 82 games for the Bruins en route to a Presidents' Trophy, scoring 8 goals and 13 assists for 21 points. However, he wouldn't register any points in 12 playoff games as the Bruins fell to rival Montreal Canadiens in seven games in the second round.

Campbell lost one of his Merlot Line teammates, Thornton, in free agency going into the 2014–15 season. The season would end up being a disappointing one for Campbell and the Bruins, as they would miss the playoffs for the first time in seven seasons. After the season, it was announced that the Bruins would not renew Campbell's contract, ending his five year tenure with the team.

==== Columbus Blue Jackets (2015–2016) ====
Campbell signed a two-year contract with the Columbus Blue Jackets on July 1, 2015. On December 17, 2016 Columbus put Campbell on unconditional waivers. Campbell was released on December 19. Reports state that Campbell was unwilling to move to the Blue Jackets minor league system. Campbell officially retired on June 9, 2017, and joined the Columbus Blue Jackets as a developmental coach the same day.

== Executive career ==
=== Columbus Blue Jackets ===
Upon retiring, Campbell joined the Blue Jackets as a player development coach. He would stay in the role for four years.

=== Florida Panthers ===
After four years in the Blue Jackets organization, Campbell followed Bill Zito to the Florida Panthers and was named Vice President of Player Personnel and Development on September 15, 2020. The next season, Campbell was named the general manager (GM) of the Charlotte Checkers, the Panthers American Hockey League (AHL) affiliate. Campbell oversaw a division title with the Checkers in 2021–22 season.

Campbell was promoted to Assistant General Manager of the Florida Panthers on September 20, 2023. He continues to serve as GM of the Checkers as well.

Campbell would win his first Stanley Cup as an executive, and second overall, when the Panthers beat the Edmonton Oilers in the 2024 Stanley Cup Final.

== Career statistics ==
=== Regular season and playoffs ===
			Regular season					Playoffs
Season	Team	League	GP	G	A	Pts	PIM	GP	G	A	Pts	PIM
1998–99	Aylmer Aces	WOHL	49	5	9	14	44	—	—	—	—	—
1999–00	St. Thomas Stars	GOJHL	55	12	8	20	51	2	0	0	0	2
2000–01	Plymouth Whalers	OHL	65	2	12	14	40	10	0	0	0	7
2001–02	Plymouth Whalers	OHL	65	17	36	53	105	6	0	2	2	13
2002–03	Kitchener Rangers	OHL	55	23	33	56	116	21	15	4	19	34
2003–04	San Antonio Rampage	AHL	76	13	16	29	73	—	—	—	—	—
2003–04	Florida Panthers	NHL	2	0	0	0	5	—	—	—	—	—
2004–05	San Antonio Rampage	AHL	70	12	16	28	113	—	—	—	—	—
2005–06	Florida Panthers	NHL	64	3	6	9	40	—	—	—	—	—
2005–06	Rochester Americans	AHL	11	3	3	6	30	—	—	—	—	—
2006–07	Florida Panthers	NHL	79	6	3	9	66	—	—	—	—	—
2007–08	Florida Panthers	NHL	81	5	13	18	72	—	—	—	—	—
2008–09	Florida Panthers	NHL	77	13	19	32	76	—	—	—	—	—
2009–10	Florida Panthers	NHL	60	2	15	17	53	—	—	—	—	—
2010–11	Boston Bruins	NHL	80	13	16	29	93	25	1	3	4	4
2011–12	Boston Bruins	NHL	78	8	8	16	80	7	0	2	2	0
2012–13	Boston Bruins	NHL	48	4	9	13	41	15	3	4	7	11
2013–14	Boston Bruins	NHL	82	8	13	21	47	12	0	0	0	4
2014–15	Boston Bruins	NHL	70	6	6	12	45	—	—	—	—	—
2015–16	Columbus Blue Jackets	NHL	82	3	8	11	78	—	—	—	—	—
NHL totals			803	71	116	187	696	59	4	9	13	19

=== International ===
Year	Team	Event	Result	GP	G	A	Pts	PIM
2003	Canada	WJC	2nd place, silver medalist(s)	6	1	1	2	4
Junior totals				6	1	1	2	4

== See also ==
- Notable families in the NHL
