= Stafford Smythe Memorial Trophy =

Annual ice hockey award in Canada

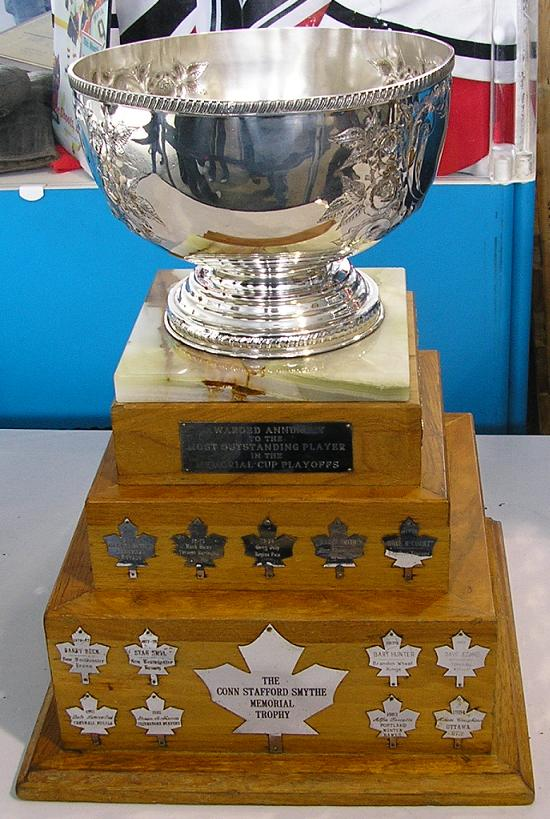
- Sport: Ice hockey
- Awarded for: Most Valuable player at the Memorial Cup

History
- First award: 1972
- Most wins: Taylor Hall (2)
- Most recent: Sam O'Reilly

The Stafford Smythe Memorial Trophy is a Canadian Hockey League (CHL) trophy, awarded to the most valuable player in the annual Memorial Cup tournament. The trophy was first awarded in 1972 and won by Richard Brodeur of the Cornwall Royals. Taylor Hall won the award in 2009 and 2010 with the Windsor Spitfires making him the first repeat winner in the trophy's history. Through the 2024 season, it has been won 22 times by players on a team representing the Western Hockey League (WHL), 15 by those from the Ontario Hockey League (OHL) and 14 by players from the Quebec Major Junior Hockey League (QMJHL).

The Kamloops Blazers franchise has had the most MVPs at six: three as members of the Blazers, and three when the franchise was known as the New Westminster Bruins. The Cornwall Royals had three MVPs. Nine players have won the Smythe Trophy despite their team failing to win the Memorial Cup: Sam Steel (2018), Dylan Strome (2017), Leon Draisaitl (2015), Danny Groulx (2002), Chris Madden (1998), Cameron Mann (1996), Sean McKenna (1982), Bart Hunter (1979), and Barry Smith (1975).

The trophy is named in honour of Stafford Smythe, the son of Conn Smythe. Stafford was part of a group that purchased controlling interest in the National Hockey League's (NHL) Toronto Maple Leafs in 1961, and served as the president of the Toronto franchise and Maple Leaf Gardens for many years. The Smythe family donated the trophy to the CHL in 1972, shortly after his death.

== Winners ==
| Tournament | Winner | Team |
|---|---|---|
| 1972 | Richard Brodeur | Cornwall Royals |
| 1973 | Mark Howe | Toronto Marlboros |
| 1974 | Greg Joly | Regina Pats |
| 1975 | Barry Smith | New Westminster Bruins |
| 1976 | Dale McCourt | Hamilton Fincups |
| 1977 | Barry Beck | New Westminster Bruins |
| 1978 | Stan Smyl | New Westminster Bruins |
| 1979 | Bart Hunter | Brandon Wheat Kings |
| 1980 | Dave Ezard | Cornwall Royals |
| 1981 | Dale Hawerchuk | Cornwall Royals |
| 1982 | Sean McKenna | Sherbrooke Castors |
| 1983 | Alfie Turcotte | Portland Winter Hawks |
| 1984 | Adam Creighton | Ottawa 67's |
| 1985 | Dan Hodgson | Prince Albert Raiders |
| 1986 | Steve Chiasson | Guelph Platers |
| 1987 | Wayne McBean | Medicine Hat Tigers |
| 1988 | Rob DiMaio | Medicine Hat Tigers |
| 1989 | Dan Lambert | Swift Current Broncos |
| 1990 | Iain Fraser | Oshawa Generals |
| 1991 | Pat Falloon | Spokane Chiefs |
| 1992 | Scott Niedermayer | Kamloops Blazers |
| 1993 | Ralph Intranuovo | Sault Ste. Marie Greyhounds |
| 1994 | Darcy Tucker | Kamloops Blazers |
| 1995 | Shane Doan | Kamloops Blazers |
| 1996 | Cameron Mann | Peterborough Petes |
| 1997 | Christian Dubé | Hull Olympiques |
| 1998 | Chris Madden | Guelph Storm |
| 1999 | Nick Boynton | Ottawa 67's |
| 2000 | Brad Richards | Rimouski Océanic |
| 2001 | Kyle Wanvig | Red Deer Rebels |
| 2002 | Danny Groulx | Victoriaville Tigres |
| 2003 | Derek Roy | Kitchener Rangers |
| 2004 | Kelly Guard | Kelowna Rockets |
| 2005 | Corey Perry | London Knights |
| 2006 | Alexander Radulov | Quebec Remparts |
| 2007 | Milan Lucic | Vancouver Giants |
| 2008 | Dustin Tokarski | Spokane Chiefs |
| 2009 | Taylor Hall | Windsor Spitfires |
| 2010 | Taylor Hall | Windsor Spitfires |
| 2011 | Jonathan Huberdeau | Saint John Sea Dogs |
| 2012 | Michael Chaput | Shawinigan Cataractes |
| 2013 | Nathan MacKinnon | Halifax Mooseheads |
| 2014 | Edgars Kulda | Edmonton Oil Kings |
| 2015 | Leon Draisaitl | Kelowna Rockets |
| 2016 | Mitch Marner | London Knights |
| 2017 | Dylan Strome | Erie Otters |
| 2018 | Sam Steel | Regina Pats |
| 2019 | Joël Teasdale | Rouyn-Noranda Huskies |
| 2020 | Event cancelled due to the coronavirus pandemic – trophy not awarded | |
| 2021 | Event cancelled due to the coronavirus pandemic – trophy not awarded | |
| 2022 | William Dufour | Saint John Sea Dogs |
| 2023 | James Malatesta | Quebec Remparts |
| 2024 | Owen Beck | Saginaw Spirit |
| 2025 | Easton Cowan | London Knights |
| 2026 | Sam O'Reilly | Kitchener Rangers |

== See also ==
- List of Canadian Hockey League awards
