= Cam Paddock =

Canadian ice hockey player

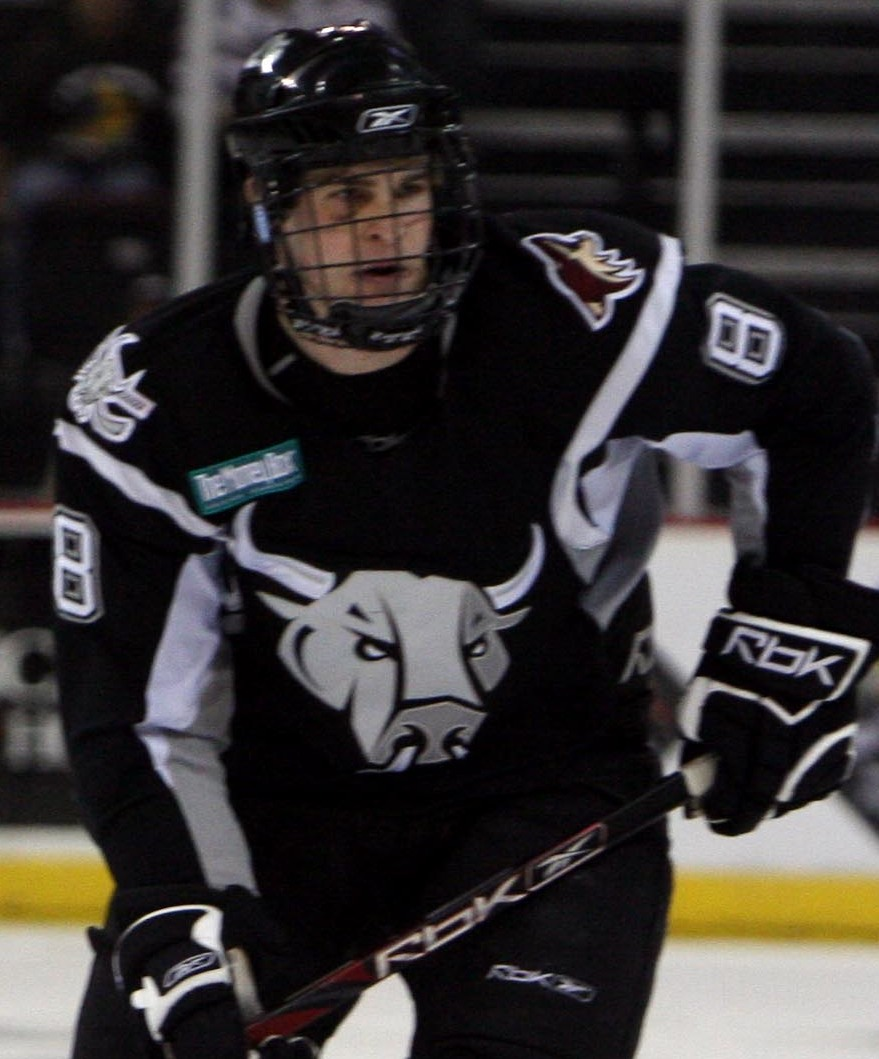
- Paddock with the San Antonio Rampage in 2007
- Born: March 22, 1983 (age 43) North Vancouver, British Columbia, Canada
- Height: 6 ft 1 in (185 cm)
- Weight: 200 lb (91 kg; 14 st 4 lb)
- Position: Centre
- Shot: Right
- Played for: St. Louis Blues; Iserlohn Roosters; Augsburger Panther; Frederikshavn White Hawks
- NHL draft: 137th overall, 2002; Pittsburgh Penguins
- Playing career: 2003–2013

Cam Paddock (born March 22, 1983) is a Canadian former professional ice hockey centre. He played in the National Hockey League (NHL) with the St. Louis Blues.

== Playing career ==
Paddock began his hockey career at the Major Junior ice hockey level, playing for the Kelowna Rockets of the Western Hockey League. As a junior, he developed as an offensive forward, playing on Kelowna's top line. In 2004, he won the Memorial Cup with the Rockets. He was drafted 137th overall in the 2002 NHL entry draft by the Pittsburgh Penguins. In the 2008–09 season, Paddock signed with the St. Louis Blues and made his long-awaited debut playing in 16 games, scoring 2 goals.

On September 26, 2011, Paddock was signed to a one-year contract with the Los Angeles Kings. He was assigned to AHL affiliate, the Manchester Monarchs, for the duration of his tenure with the Kings in the 2011–12 season. On January 27, 2012, Paddock sought a release from the Kings and signed for the remainder of the season to return to the Deutsche Eishockey Liga with Augsburger Panther.

On August 23, 2012, Paddock was again on the move signing a one-year deal to remain in Europe with Frederikshavn White Hawks of the Danish AL-Bank Ligaen.

== Career statistics ==
=== Regular season and playoffs ===
			Regular season					Playoffs
Season	Team	League	GP	G	A	Pts	PIM	GP	G	A	Pts	PIM
1999–2000	Kelowna Rockets	WHL	46	5	5	10	42	5	0	0	0	0
2000–01	Kelowna Rockets	WHL	72	14	10	24	110	6	0	0	0	4
2001–02	Kelowna Rockets	WHL	72	38	35	73	122	15	8	6	14	35
2002–03	Kelowna Rockets	WHL	71	33	26	59	107	19	11	8	19	18
2003–04	Kelowna Rockets	WHL	62	17	22	39	86	16	3	4	7	22
2003–04	Wilkes–Barre/Scranton Penguins	AHL	1	0	0	0	2	—	—	—	—	—
2004–05	Wilkes–Barre/Scranton Penguins	AHL	16	0	0	0	13	—	—	—	—	—
2004–05	Wheeling Nailers	ECHL	53	11	18	29	70	—	—	—	—	—
2005–06	Wheeling Nailers	ECHL	61	14	24	38	90	9	0	0	0	12
2005–06	Wilkes–Barre/Scranton Penguins	AHL	4	0	0	0	2	—	—	—	—	—
2006–07	Phoenix Roadrunners	ECHL	46	11	20	31	117	3	2	0	2	9
2006–07	San Antonio Rampage	AHL	22	0	2	2	13	—	—	—	—	—
2007–08	San Antonio Rampage	AHL	78	12	13	25	107	7	0	2	2	18
2008–09	Peoria Rivermen	AHL	60	8	7	15	96	7	2	2	4	0
2008–09	St. Louis Blues	NHL	16	2	1	3	0	—	—	—	—	—
2009–10	Peoria Rivermen	AHL	80	15	12	27	95	—	—	—	—	—
2010–11	Iserlohn Roosters	DEL	46	5	12	17	40	—	—	—	—	—
2011–12	Manchester Monarchs	AHL	39	2	3	5	44	—	—	—	—	—
2011–12	Augsburger Panther	DEL	13	3	5	8	20	2	0	0	0	2
2012–13	Frederikshavn White Hawks	DEN	40	17	16	33	60	15	4	9	13	8
AHL totals			300	37	37	74	372	14	2	4	6	18
ECHL totals			160	36	62	98	277	12	2	0	2	21
NHL totals			16	2	1	3	0	—	—	—	—	—

=== International ===
Year	Team	Event	Result	GP	G	A	Pts	PIM
2000	Canada Pacific	U17	3rd place, bronze medalist(s)	5	0	3	3	0
Junior totals				5	0	3	3	0
