= Hap Emms Memorial Trophy =

Annual ice hockey award in Canada

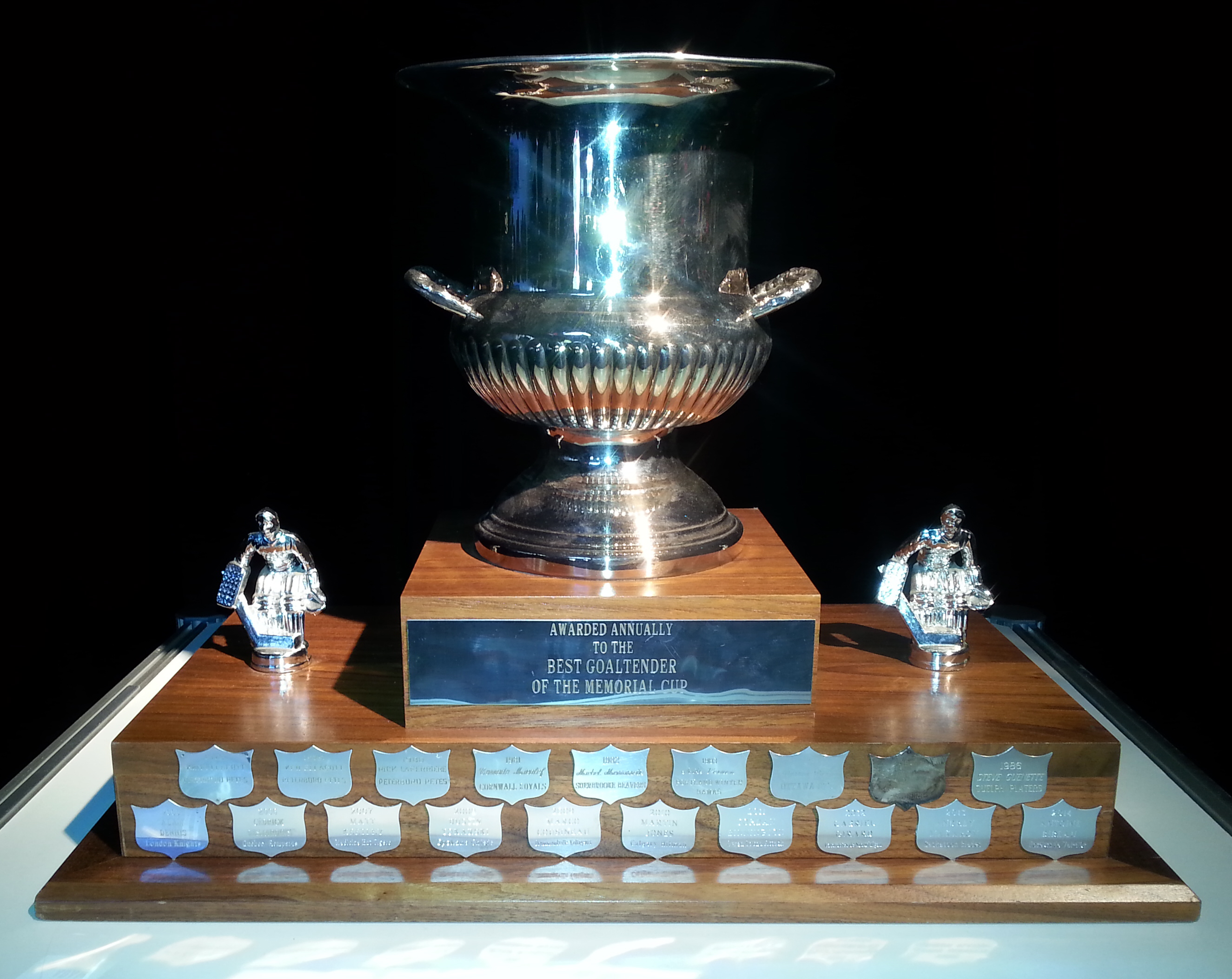
- Sport: Ice hockey
- Awarded for: Awarded to the outstanding goaltender of the Memorial Cup tournament

History
- First award: 1975
- Most recent: Austin Elliott

The Hap Emms Memorial Trophy is awarded to the outstanding goaltender at the Memorial Cup of the Canadian Hockey League. The award is named after Leighton "Hap" Emms, a former NHL player, who had a 33 year presence in the Ontario Hockey Association as a coach, owner, general manager, pioneer of the game. During his involvement with the Barrie Flyers, Niagara Falls Flyers, and St. Catharines Black Hawks between 1945 and 1978; his teams appeared in eight Memorial Cup tournaments, winning four times. The Emms Trophy, and the Emms Family Award, are also named for Emms.

== Winners ==
List of recipients of the Hap Emms Memorial Trophy.

Tournament	Winner	Team
1975	Gary Carr	Toronto Marlboros
1976	Maurice Barrette	Quebec Remparts
1977	Pat Riggin	Ottawa 67's
1978	Ken Ellacott	Peterborough Petes
1979	Bart Hunter	Brandon Wheat Kings
1980	Rick LaFerriere	Peterborough Petes
1981	Corrado Micalef	Cornwall Royals
1982	Michael Morrissette	Sherbrooke Castors
1983	Mike Vernon	Portland Winter Hawks
1984	Darren Pang	Ottawa 67's
1985	Ward Komonosky	Prince Albert Raiders
1986	Steve Guenette	Guelph Platers
1987	Mark Fitzpatrick	Medicine Hat Tigers
1988	Mark Fitzpatrick	Medicine Hat Tigers
1989	Mike Greenlay	Saskatoon Blades
1990	Mike Torchia	Kitchener Rangers
1991	Felix Potvin	Chicoutimi Saguenéens
1992	Corey Hirsch	Kamloops Blazers
1993	Kevin Hodson	Sault Ste. Marie Greyhounds
1994	Eric Fichaud	Chicoutimi Saguenéens
1995	Jason Saal	Detroit Junior Red Wings
1996	Frederic Deschenes	Granby Prédateurs
1997	Christian Bronsard	Hull Olympiques
1998	Chris Madden	Guelph Storm
1999	Cory Campbell	Belleville Bulls
2000	Sebastien Caron	Rimouski Océanic
2001	Maxime Daigneault	Val-d'Or Foreurs
2002	T. J. Aceti	Erie Otters
2003	Scott Dickie	Kitchener Rangers
2004	Kelly Guard	Kelowna Rockets
2005	Adam Dennis	London Knights
2006	Cedrick Desjardins	Quebec Remparts
2007	Matt Keetley	Medicine Hat Tigers
2008	Dustin Tokarski	Spokane Chiefs
2009	Marco Cousineau	Drummondville Voltigeurs
2010	Martin Jones	Calgary Hitmen
2011	Jordan Binnington	Owen Sound Attack
2012	Gabriel Girard	Shawinigan Cataractes
2013	Andrey Makarov	Saskatoon Blades
2014	Antoine Bibeau	Val-d'Or Foreurs
2015	Ken Appleby	Oshawa Generals
2016	Tyler Parsons	London Knights
2017	Michael DiPietro	Windsor Spitfires
2018	Kaden Fulcher	Hamilton Bulldogs
2019	Alexis Gravel	Halifax Mooseheads
2020	Event cancelled due to the coronavirus pandemic – trophy not awarded	
2021	Event cancelled due to the coronavirus pandemic – trophy not awarded	
2022	Nikolas Hurtubise	Saint John Sea Dogs
2023	William Rousseau	Quebec Remparts
2024	Michael Simpson	London Knights
2025	Austin Elliott	London Knights
2026	Christian Kirsch	Kitchener Rangers

== See also ==
- List of Canadian Hockey League awards
