= Maurice Barrette =

Canadian ice hockey player (1956–2018)

- Born: February 17, 1956; Montreal, Quebec, Canada
- Died: September 30, 2018 (aged 62)
- Height: 5 ft 7 in (170 cm)
- Weight: 150 lb (68 kg; 10 st 10 lb)
- Position: Goaltender
- Caught: Left
- Played for: Nova Scotia Voyageurs; Springfield Indians
- NHL draft: 5th round, 90th overall, 1976; Montreal Canadiens
- WHA draft: 44th overall, 1976; Quebec Nordiques
- Playing career: 1976–1979

Maurice Barrette (February 17, 1956 – September 30, 2018) was a Canadian professional ice hockey goaltender who played for the Quebec Remparts of the QMJHL, Nova Scotia Voyageurs of the AHL and the Springfield Indians.

Barrette was drafted in the middle rounds, in 1976, by both the Montreal Canadiens of the NHL and Quebec Nordiques while they were part of the WHA. He played neither a game for the Nordiques nor Canadiens, however.

The biggest highlight of his career was winning the Hap Emms Memorial Trophy for outstanding goaltender in the 1976 Memorial Cup Finals.
