= Clarke MacArthur =

Canadian ice hockey player

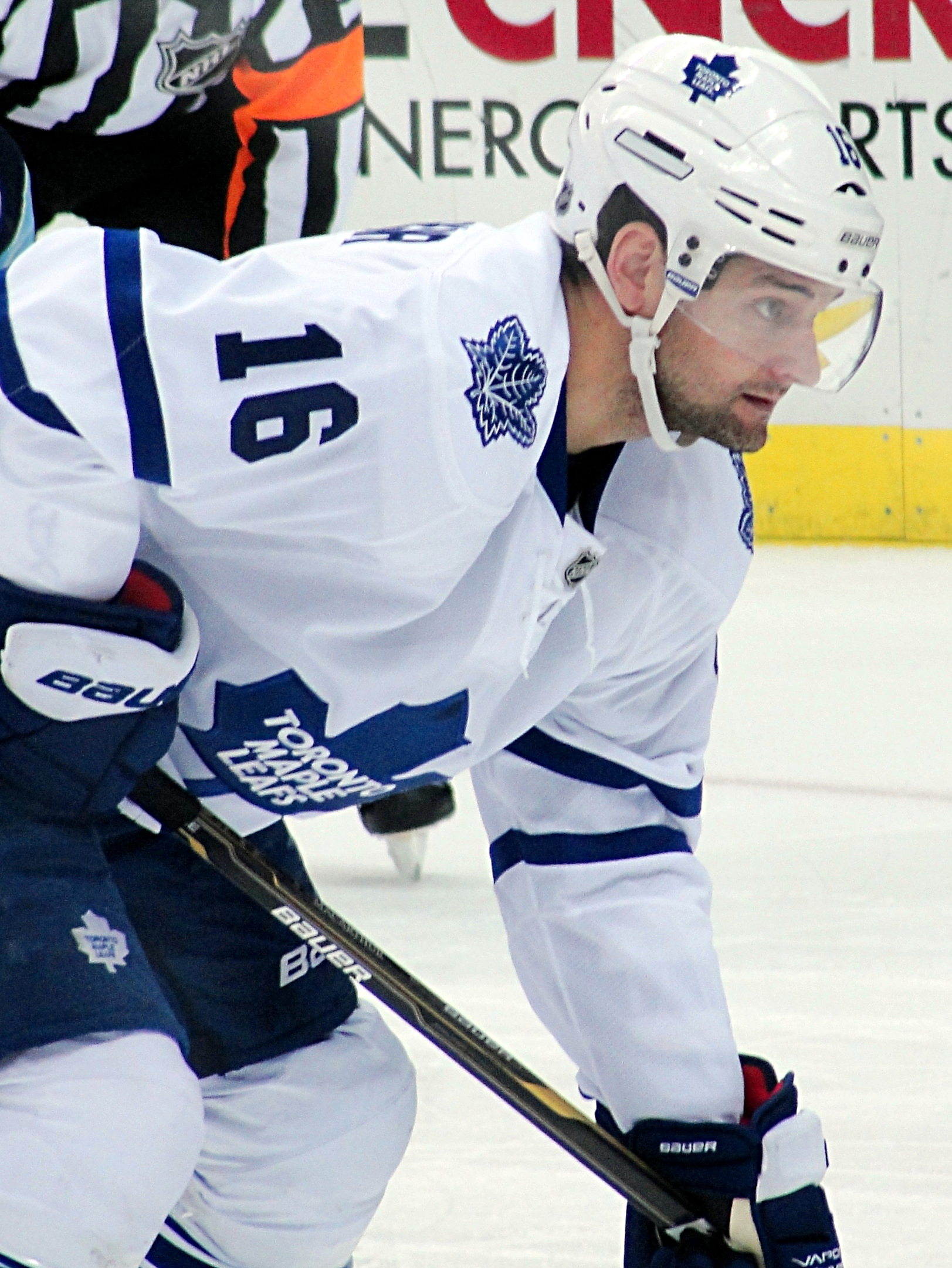
- MacArthur with the Toronto Maple Leafs in 2012
- Born: April 6, 1985 (age 41) Lloydminster, Alberta, Canada
- Height: 6 ft 0 in (183 cm)
- Weight: 191 lb (87 kg; 13 st 9 lb)
- Position: Left wing
- Shot: Left
- Played for: Buffalo Sabres; Atlanta Thrashers; Toronto Maple Leafs; Ottawa Senators
- NHL draft: 74th overall, 2003; Buffalo Sabres
- Playing career: 2005–2017

Clarke MacArthur (born April 6, 1985) is a Canadian former professional ice hockey player. He was a left winger in the National Hockey League (NHL) with the Ottawa Senators, Buffalo Sabres, Atlanta Thrashers and Toronto Maple Leafs. He was originally selected by Buffalo in the third round, 74th overall, at the 2003 NHL entry draft.

Prior to turning professional, MacArthur spent three seasons playing for the Medicine Hat Tigers in the Western Hockey League (WHL). While playing major junior hockey, he was named to the 2004 Memorial Cup All-Star and 2005 WHL Eastern Conference All-Star Teams. MacArthur was also a member of Canada's gold medal-winning squad at the 2005 World Junior Championships.

== Playing career ==
=== Amateur ===
MacArthur played minor hockey in his hometown of Lloydminster, Alberta. He went unselected in the Western Hockey League (WHL) Bantam Draft when he was eligible, due in part to his short stature. While playing bantam hockey in Alberta, MacArthur put up impressive statistics, despite standing only 5'4". He recorded 99 points in 38 games during the 2000–01 season with the Strathcona Warriors. After the season, he was named his club's most valuable player.

With the numbers MacArthur put up in bantam hockey, he was able to secure a tryout with the Medicine Hat Tigers, but was the club's final cut heading into the 2001–02 season. As a result, MacArthur played in the Alberta Junior Hockey League (AJHL) for the Drayton Valley Thunder. In his only season in the AJHL, MacArthur recorded 62 points in 62 games, and helped the Thunder capture a League championship. During the season, he grew seven inches and Medicine Hat was again interested in obtaining his services. He subsequently joined the club for the 2002–03 season, putting up 75 points in 70 games as a rookie. During the summer, MacArthur was then drafted by the Buffalo Sabres in the third round, 74th overall, of the 2003 NHL entry draft.

During his sophomore season in the WHL, 2003–04, MacArthur helped lead the Tigers to the Ed Chynoweth Cup as League champions and a berth in the 2004 Memorial Cup. MacArthur was the fourth-leading scorer in the tournament with one goal and four assists and was named to the Memorial Cup All-Star Team. The Tigers, however, lost in the semifinal of the tournament to the Kelowna Rockets. MacArthur played in 58 games during the 2004–05 season with the Tigers and recorded 74 points, while serving as one of the club's alternate captains. After the season, he was named to the WHL's Eastern Conference First All-Star Team. MacArthur was remarkably consistent during his WHL career, scoring 75, 75 and 74 points in his three WHL seasons.

=== Professional ===
MacArthur began his professional career with the Rochester Americans of the American Hockey League (AHL), the Buffalo Sabres' top minor league affiliate, for the team's run in the 2005 playoffs, appearing in three games and recording an assist for his first professional point. He remained with Rochester in 2005–06, recording 53 points over 69 games in his first full professional season.

After starting the 2006–07 season in Rochester for a second year, MacArthur made his NHL debut for Buffalo on December 19, 2006, against the Montreal Canadiens. He split time between the Americans and Sabres for the rest of the season, finishing with 63 points over 51 games in the AHL and seven points over 19 games in the NHL. He recorded his first NHL point, an assist, on February 20, 2007, against the Philadelphia Flyers and scored his first career goal against the Ottawa Senators on February 22.

During the 2007–08 season, MacArthur again spent time with the Americans and Sabres. At the NHL level, he scored eight goals and added seven assists in 37 games, while recording 42 points in 43 games with the Americans. After the season, MacArthur became a restricted free agent before re-signing to a one-year deal with the Sabres. MacArthur spent his first full season at the NHL level in 2008–09, playing in 71 games with the Sabres and recording 31 points. After the season, the Sabres tendered MacArthur a qualifying offer to retain his rights; he subsequently signed a two-year deal with the club in July 2009. MacArthur played in 60 games for the Sabres, scoring 13 goals and adding 13 assists before being traded to the Atlanta Thrashers in exchange for two draft picks at the NHL trade deadline. He finished the season with the Thrashers recording nine points in 21 games.

After the 2009–10 season, MacArthur filed for salary arbitration. After the hearing, he was awarded a one-year contract worth $2.4 million, a significant raise over his previous salary of $1.4 million. The Thrashers chose not to accept the arbitration award, however, and MacArthur subsequently became an unrestricted free agent.

MacArthur signed a one-year deal for $1.1 million with the Toronto Maple Leafs on August 28, 2010, ahead of the 2010–11 season. When asked later about his decision to sign in Toronto, MacArthur said, "It was nice to come back to a hockey community." He later added, "It's the most fun I've had since junior." Maple Leafs captain Dion Phaneuf, one of MacArthur's teammates at the 2005 World Junior Championships, was influential in the decision to sign with Toronto. MacArthur scored goals in each of his first four games with the club, becoming the first player in team history to do so. The following month, he tied his personal career-best when he scored two goals against the Pittsburgh Penguins on October 13. On November 16 he tied a club record by recording three assists in a period against the Nashville Predators. At the end of his first season with the Maple Leafs, he signed a two-year contract extension at $3.25 million per annum on July 5, 2011, thereby avoiding salary arbitration with the club.

On July 5, 2013, after his contract had expired with the Maple Leafs, MacArthur signed a two-year, $6.5 million deal with Toronto's Ontario rivals, the Ottawa Senators. On August 19, 2014, the Senators announced they had signed MacArthur to a five-year contract extension worth a total of $23.25 million—carrying a $4.65 million annual average value—set to start in the 2015–16 season.

On February 16, 2015, MacArthur collided with goalie Robin Lehner, resulting in both players being diagnosed with concussions. On October 20, 2015, Senators general manager Brian Murray announced that MacArthur suffered another concussion during a game against the Columbus Blue Jackets on October 14 and that MacArthur would not be playing in the near future. MacArthur played only the first four games of the 2015-16 season due to his concussion, although he passed a "baseline test" and was announced to be "medically cleared to play" in late March 2016.

During a training camp game on September 25, 2016, MacArthur suffered another concussion when newly-acquired Patrick Sieloff hit MacArthur into the boards. Bobby Ryan immediately began a fight with Sieloff, which was quickly broken up. Sieloff was sent to the Senators' AHL affiliate the Binghamton Senators shortly afterwards. On January 20, 2017, the Senators announced that MacArthur would not play any of the remaining games of the season on the recommendation of various doctors, despite MacArthur's insistence, that he did not have any symptoms of post-concussion syndrome. On April 4, 2017, MacArthur returned to the Senators' lineup after an 18-month absence and played in all of the Senators' four remaining regular season games. On April 23, 2017, MacArthur scored the series-winning goal (on the powerplay for a 3-2 win 6:30 into overtime of game six) against the Boston Bruins in their first round playoff matchup.

At the beginning of training camp for the 2017-2018 NHL season, it was announced that MacArthur had failed his physical and therefore could not attend camp. On November 14, 2017, Senators general manager Pierre Dorion stated it was "highly doubtful" MacArthur would ever play another NHL game. In 2018, it was reported by Spectrum News Rochester that MacArthur had retired, although MacArthur himself has never made an official statement.

== International play ==
Medal record

Representing Canada

Men's ice hockey

World Junior Championships
Gold medal – first place	2005 Grand Forks	

MacArthur made his international debut playing for Team West at the 2002 World Under-17 Hockey Challenge, which was held in Manitoba. Two years later, he was invited to attend Canada's junior team Summer Development Camp in August 2004. He was ultimately chosen to the squad in December to compete in the 2005 World Junior Championships. During the tournament, MacArthur scored four goals in six games, tied for tenth in tournament scoring. One of the players he tied with was American Phil Kessel, who would become teammates with MacArthur in the NHL. In Canada's first game of the tournament against Slovakia, MacArthur scored two goals. Canada eventually captured gold at the tournament after routing Russia 6–1 in the final.

== Personal life ==
MacArthur's parents are named Dean and Deborah, and he has one sister, Kristin. As a child, his favorite hockey team was the Edmonton Oilers and his favorite player Forward Vincent Lecavalier. Clarke also has an uncle Ken MacArthur who was selected by the Minnesota North Stars the eighth round (148th overall) of the 1988 NHL entry draft.

MacArthur and his wife Jessica have two children together.

== Career statistics ==
=== Regular season and playoffs ===
			Regular season					Playoffs
Season	Team	League	GP	G	A	Pts	PIM	GP	G	A	Pts	PIM
2001–02	Drayton Valley Thunder	AJHL	61	22	40	62	33	16	5	8	13	34
2002–03	Medicine Hat Tigers	WHL	70	23	52	75	104	11	3	6	9	8
2003–04	Medicine Hat Tigers	WHL	62	35	40	75	93	20	8	10	18	16
2004–05	Medicine Hat Tigers	WHL	57	30	44	74	100	13	3	8	11	18
2004–05	Rochester Americans	AHL	—	—	—	—	—	3	0	1	1	0
2005–06	Rochester Americans	AHL	69	21	32	53	71	—	—	—	—	—
2006–07	Rochester Americans	AHL	51	21	42	63	57	6	2	4	6	4
2006–07	Buffalo Sabres	NHL	19	3	4	7	4	—	—	—	—	—
2007–08	Rochester Americans	AHL	43	14	28	42	26	—	—	—	—	—
2007–08	Buffalo Sabres	NHL	37	8	7	15	20	—	—	—	—	—
2008–09	Buffalo Sabres	NHL	71	17	14	31	56	—	—	—	—	—
2009–10	Buffalo Sabres	NHL	60	13	13	26	47	—	—	—	—	—
2009–10	Atlanta Thrashers	NHL	21	3	6	9	2	—	—	—	—	—
2010–11	Toronto Maple Leafs	NHL	82	21	41	62	37	—	—	—	—	—
2011–12	Toronto Maple Leafs	NHL	73	20	23	43	37	—	—	—	—	—
2012–13	ETC Crimmitschau	DEU.2	9	4	7	11	16	—	—	—	—	—
2012–13	Toronto Maple Leafs	NHL	40	8	12	20	26	5	2	1	3	2
2013–14	Ottawa Senators	NHL	79	24	31	55	78	—	—	—	—	—
2014–15	Ottawa Senators	NHL	62	16	20	36	36	6	2	0	2	18
2015–16	Ottawa Senators	NHL	4	0	0	0	0	—	—	—	—	—
2016–17	Ottawa Senators	NHL	4	0	0	0	0	19	3	6	9	12
NHL totals			552	133	171	304	343	30	7	7	14	32

Junior and professional statistics source

=== International ===
Year	Team	Event	Result	GP	G	A	Pts	PIM
2005	Canada	WJC	1st place, gold medalist(s)	6	4	0	4	10
Junior totals				6	4	0	4	10

International statistics source

== Awards ==
Year	Award
2004	Memorial Cup All-Star Team
2005	WHL Eastern Conference First All-Star Team
