= Josh Gorges =

Canadian ice hockey player (born 1984)

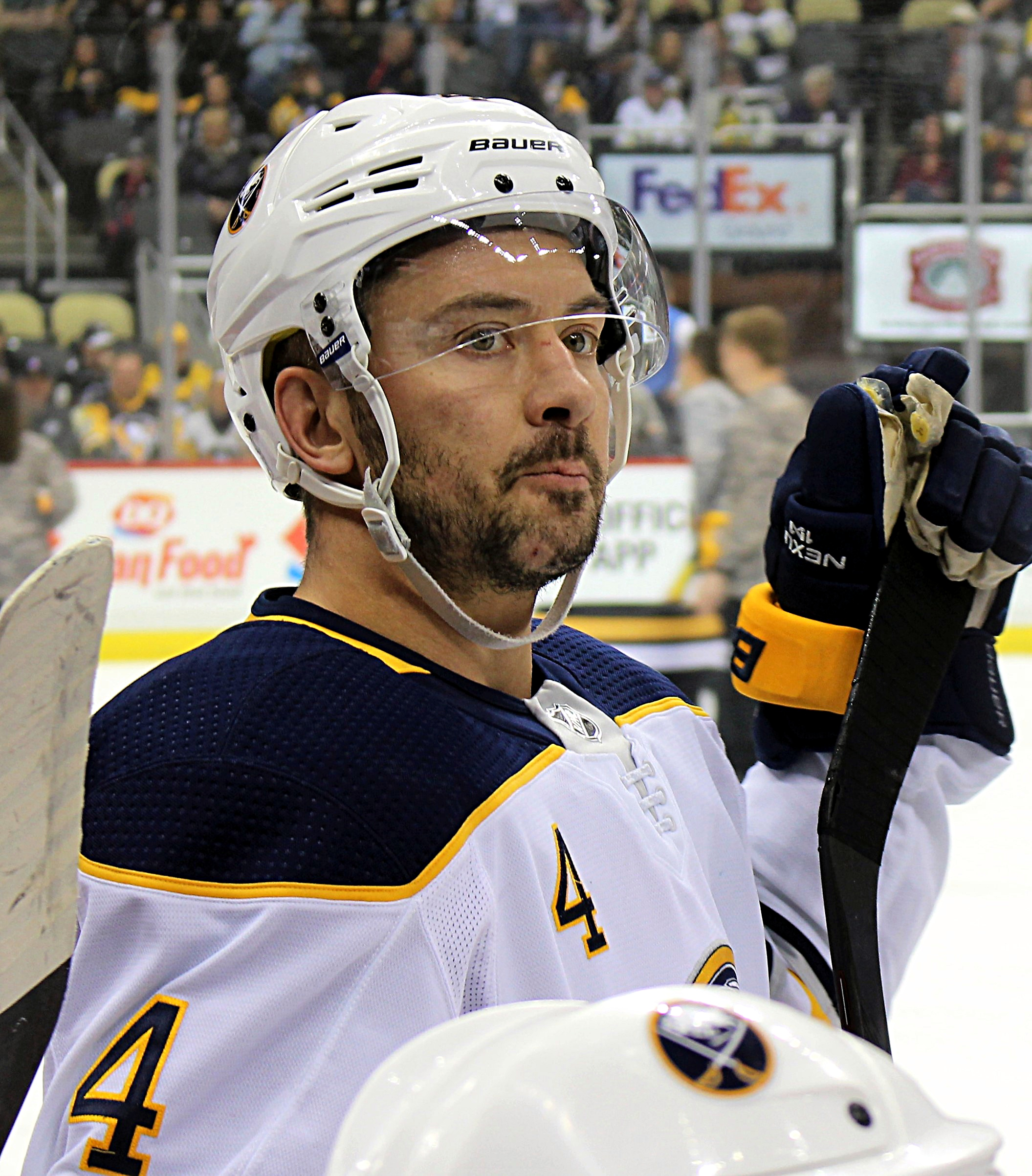
- Gorges with the Buffalo Sabres in 2017
- Born: August 14, 1984 (age 41) Kelowna, British Columbia, Canada
- Height: 6 ft 1 in (185 cm)
- Weight: 204 lb (93 kg; 14 st 8 lb)
- Position: Defence
- Shot: Left
- Played for: San Jose Sharks; Montreal Canadiens; Buffalo Sabres
- NHL draft: Undrafted
- Playing career: 2005–2018

Joshua Daniel Gorges (born August 14, 1984) is a Canadian former professional ice hockey defenceman. He is of German ancestry; his grandparents emigrated from Germany to Canada. Gorges played in the National Hockey League (NHL) for the San Jose Sharks, Montreal Canadiens and Buffalo Sabres.

== Playing career ==
As a youth, Gorges played in the 1998 Quebec International Pee-Wee Hockey Tournament with a minor ice hockey team from Kelowna.

Gorges played major junior for his hometown Kelowna Rockets of the Western Hockey League (WHL) from 2000 through 2004. After going undrafted in 2002, he signed as a free agent with the San Jose Sharks. Gorges was named Team WHL captain for the 2003 RE/MAX Canada–Russia Challenge. He was also a member of Team Canada at the 2004 World Junior Ice Hockey Championships, where he won a silver medal. In 2004, the Rockets (with Gorges as team captain) won the Memorial Cup.

During the 2004–05 NHL lockout, Gorges played for the Sharks' American Hockey League (AHL) affiliate, the Cleveland Barons. He made his debut for the Sharks during the 2005-06 season, skating in 49 games.

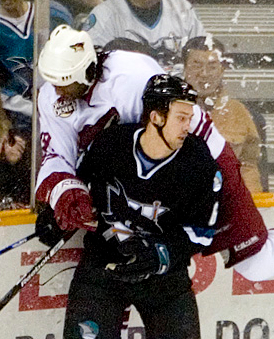
Gorges with the Sharks in 2006.

On February 25, 2007, Gorges and a 2007 first-round pick were traded to the Montreal Canadiens in exchange for Craig Rivet and a 2008 fifth-round pick. On July 9, 2008, the Canadiens signed Gorges to a three-year, $3.3 million contract extension.

On February 10, 2010, during a game against the Washington Capitals, Gorges was hit on the left side of the head by a slap shot from Mike Green. Gorges remained motionless on the ice for several minutes, with his head bleeding. He eventually was helped up by team doctors and helped to the bench. The Canadiens eventually won the game 6–5 in OT to end the Capitals 14-game win streak. Gorges skated in practice the next day and was quoted as saying "Unless something happens in the next 24 hours, I’ll be in the lineup against the Flyers."

Gorges was widely praised for his performances in the 2010 Stanley Cup Playoffs, with Don Cherry declaring "Josh Gorges should be captain of the Canadiens, there’s no doubt in my mind. He’s a captain’s captain. This isn’t in any way to say that Brian Gionta is bad, it’s only to say that Gorges is so good. He’s exceptional. And I think Brian would be happy to have a little pressure taken off him so he could just play the game. Look up the word ‘leader’ in the dictionary, and you’ll find Gorges’s picture."

On July 22, 2011, the Canadiens re-signed Gorges to a one-year, $2.5 million contract extension.

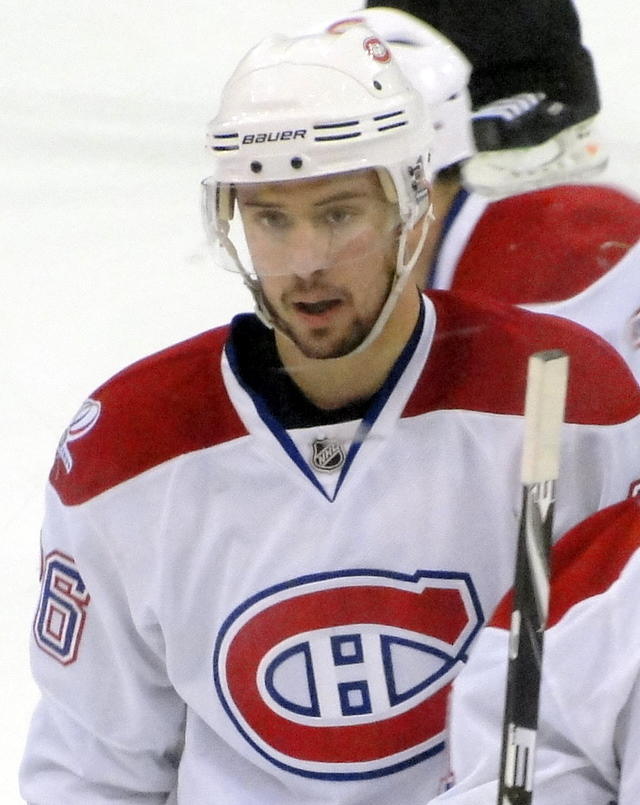
Gorges with the Canadiens in May 2010.

On January 1, 2012, Gorges signed a six-year, $23.4 million contract extension with the Canadiens.

On July 1, 2014, Gorges was traded to the Buffalo Sabres in exchange for the Minnesota Wild's 2016 second-round pick. He refused to waive his no-trade clause to be traded to the Canadiens' rival, the Toronto Maple Leafs.

Upon concluding his contract with the Sabres following the 2017–18 season, Gorges remained an un-signed free agent over the summer and into the 2018–19 season. On January 14, 2019, Gorges announced his retirement from his 13 season NHL career.

== Post-hockey career ==
Gorges served as the West Kelowna Warriors Director of Player Development. He has helped organize a local mental health charity baseball game in Kelowna with other former NHLers.

== Career statistics ==
=== Regular season and playoffs ===
			Regular season					Playoffs
Season	Team	League	GP	G	A	Pts	PIM	GP	G	A	Pts	PIM
2000–01	Kelowna Rockets	WHL	57	4	6	10	24	6	1	1	2	4
2001–02	Kelowna Rockets	WHL	72	7	34	41	74	15	1	7	8	8
2002–03	Kelowna Rockets	WHL	54	11	48	59	76	19	3	17	20	16
2003–04	Kelowna Rockets	WHL	62	11	31	42	38	17	2	13	15	6
2004–05	Cleveland Barons	AHL	20	3	3	6	4	—	—	—	—	—
2005–06	San Jose Sharks	NHL	49	0	6	6	31	11	0	1	1	4
2005–06	Cleveland Barons	AHL	18	2	3	5	12	—	—	—	—	—
2006–07	San Jose Sharks	NHL	47	1	3	4	26	—	—	—	—	—
2006–07	Worcester Sharks	AHL	7	0	1	1	2	—	—	—	—	—
2006–07	Montreal Canadiens	NHL	7	0	0	0	0	—	—	—	—	—
2007–08	Montreal Canadiens	NHL	62	0	9	9	32	12	0	3	3	0
2008–09	Montreal Canadiens	NHL	81	4	19	23	37	4	0	1	1	7
2009–10	Montreal Canadiens	NHL	82	3	7	10	39	19	0	2	2	14
2010–11	Montreal Canadiens	NHL	36	1	6	7	18	—	—	—	—	—
2011–12	Montreal Canadiens	NHL	82	2	14	16	39	—	—	—	—	—
2012–13	Montreal Canadiens	NHL	48	2	7	9	15	5	0	0	0	4
2013–14	Montreal Canadiens	NHL	66	1	13	14	12	17	0	2	2	6
2014–15	Buffalo Sabres	NHL	46	0	6	6	16	—	—	—	—	—
2015–16	Buffalo Sabres	NHL	77	2	10	12	72	—	—	—	—	—
2016–17	Buffalo Sabres	NHL	66	1	5	6	50	—	—	—	—	—
2017–18	Buffalo Sabres	NHL	34	0	2	2	17	—	—	—	—	—
NHL totals			783	17	107	124	404	68	0	9	9	35

Medal record

Representing Canada

World Junior Championships
Silver medal – second place	2004 Finland	

=== International ===
Year	Team	Event	Result	GP	G	A	Pts	PIM
2004	Canada	WJC	2nd place, silver medalist(s)	6	0	3	3	4
Junior totals				6	0	3	3	4

== Awards ==
- 2002–03: WHL – West Second All-Star Team
- 2004: Memorial Cup – George Parsons Trophy (Most Sportsmanlike Player)
- 2003–04: WHL – West First All-Star Team
- 2004: Junior World Championships – Silver medal
- 2004–05: Cleveland Barons rookie of the year
- 2004–05: Cleveland Barons Rubbermaid "Player of the Year" (along with Doug Murray)
- 2011–12: Montreal Canadiens Jacques-Beauchamp-Molson individual team award (Unsung Hero)
