= George Parsons Trophy =

Annual ice hockey award in Canada

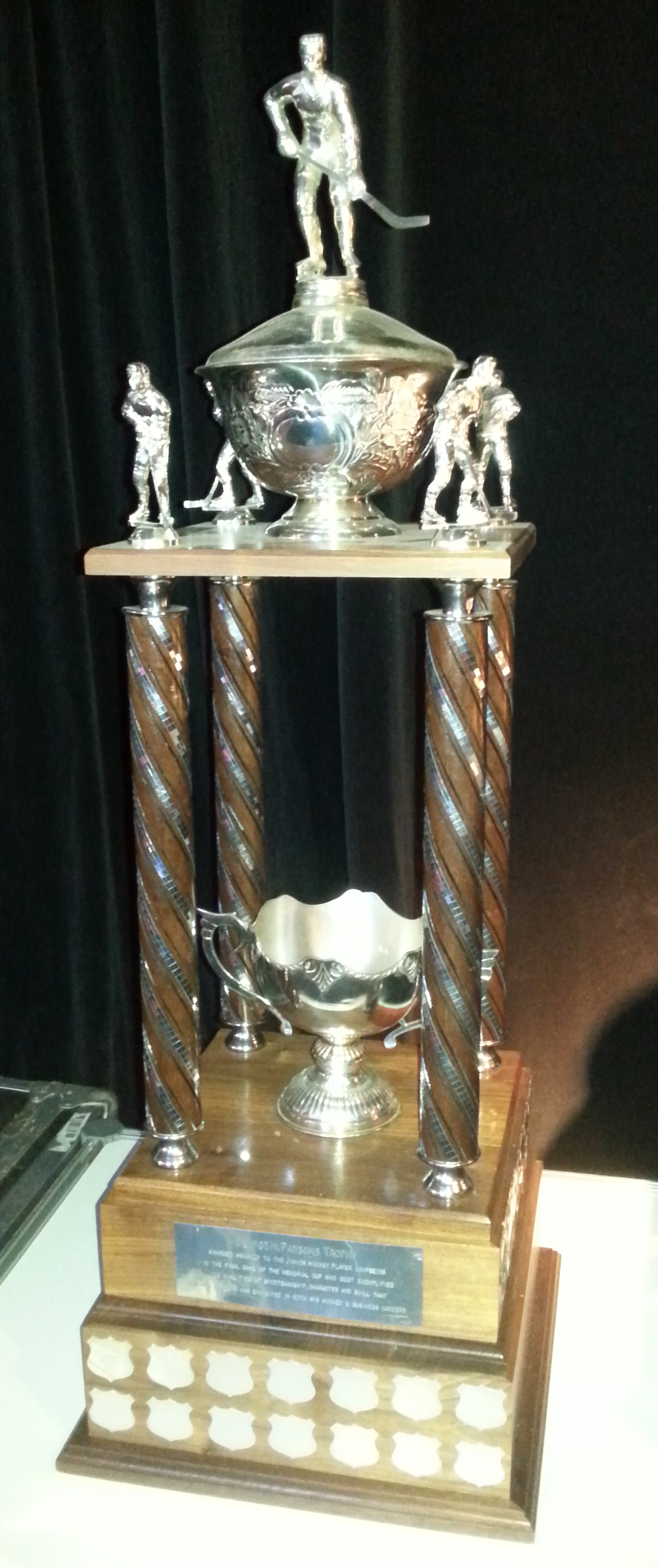
- Sport: Ice hockey
- Awarded for: Awarded to the player judged to be the most sportsmanlike at the Memorial Cup tournament

History
- First award: 1974
- Most recent: Denton Mateychuk

The George Parsons Trophy is awarded annually to the player judged to be the most sportsmanlike at the Memorial Cup tournament. It was first awarded in 1974. The trophy is named for George Parsons, a former Ontario Hockey Association player whose career was ended prematurely in 1939, due to an eye injury in a National Hockey League game. Parsons appeared in the 1933 Memorial Cup as a member of the West Toronto Nationals, and the 1934 Memorial Cup as a member of the Toronto Young Rangers. Parsons later became involved with CCM hockey, helping to develop hockey helmets and facial protection for player safety, that were approved by the Canadian Standards Association and endorsed by the Canadian Amateur Hockey Association in 1976.

== Winners ==
List of winners of the George Parsons Trophy.

Tournament	Winner	Team
1974	Guy Chouinard	Quebec Remparts
1975	John Smrke	Toronto Marlboros
1976	Richard Shinske	New Westminster Bruins
1977	Bobby Smith	Ottawa 67's
1978	Mark Kirton	Peterborough Petes
1979	Chris Halyk	Peterborough Petes
1980	Dale Hawerchuk	Cornwall Royals
1981	Mark Morrison	Victoria Cougars
1982	Brian Bellows	Kitchener Rangers
1983	Dave Gans	Oshawa Generals
1984	Brian Wilks	Kitchener Rangers
1985	Tony Grenier	Prince Albert Raiders
1986	Kerry Huffman	Guelph Platers
1987	Scott McCrory	Oshawa Generals
1988	Martin Gelinas	Hull Olympiques
1989	Jamey Hicks	Peterborough Petes
1990	Jason Firth	Kitchener Rangers
1991	Ray Whitney	Spokane Chiefs
1992	Colin Miller	Sault Ste. Marie Greyhounds
1993	Jason Dawe	Peterborough Petes
1994	Yanick Dube	Laval Titan
1995	Jarome Iginla	Kamloops Blazers
1996	Mike Williams	Peterborough Petes
1997	Radoslav Suchy	Chicoutimi Saguenéens
1998	Manny Malhotra	Guelph Storm
1999	Brian Campbell	Ottawa 67's
2000	Brandon Reid	Halifax Mooseheads
2001	Brandon Reid	Val-d'Or Foreurs
2002	Tomas Plihal	Kootenay Ice
2003	Gregory Campbell	Kitchener Rangers
2004	Josh Gorges	Kelowna Rockets
2005	Marc-Antoine Pouliot	Rimouski Oceanic
2006	Jerome Samson	Moncton Wildcats
2007	Brennan Bosch	Medicine Hat Tigers
2008	Matthew Halischuk	Kitchener Rangers
2009	Yannick Riendeau	Drummondville Voltigeurs
2010	Toni Rajala	Brandon Wheat Kings
2011	Marc Cantin	Mississauga St. Michael's Majors
2012	Zack Phillips	Saint John Sea Dogs
2013	Bo Horvat	London Knights
2014	Curtis Lazar	Edmonton Oil Kings
2015	Alexis Loiseau	Rimouski Oceanic
2016	Francis Perron	Rouyn-Noranda Huskies
2017	Anthony Cirelli	Erie Otters
2018	Adam Holwell	Acadie–Bathurst Titan
2019	Nick Suzuki	Guelph Storm
2020	Event cancelled due to the coronavirus pandemic – trophy not awarded	
2021	Event cancelled due to the coronavirus pandemic – trophy not awarded	
2022	Logan Morrison	Hamilton Bulldogs
2023	Logan Stankoven	Kamloops Blazers
2024	Denton Mateychuk	Moose Jaw Warriors
2025	Alex Mercier	Moncton Wildcats
2026	Matias Vanhanen	Everett Silvertips

== See also ==
- List of Canadian Hockey League awards
