= Petr Kanko =

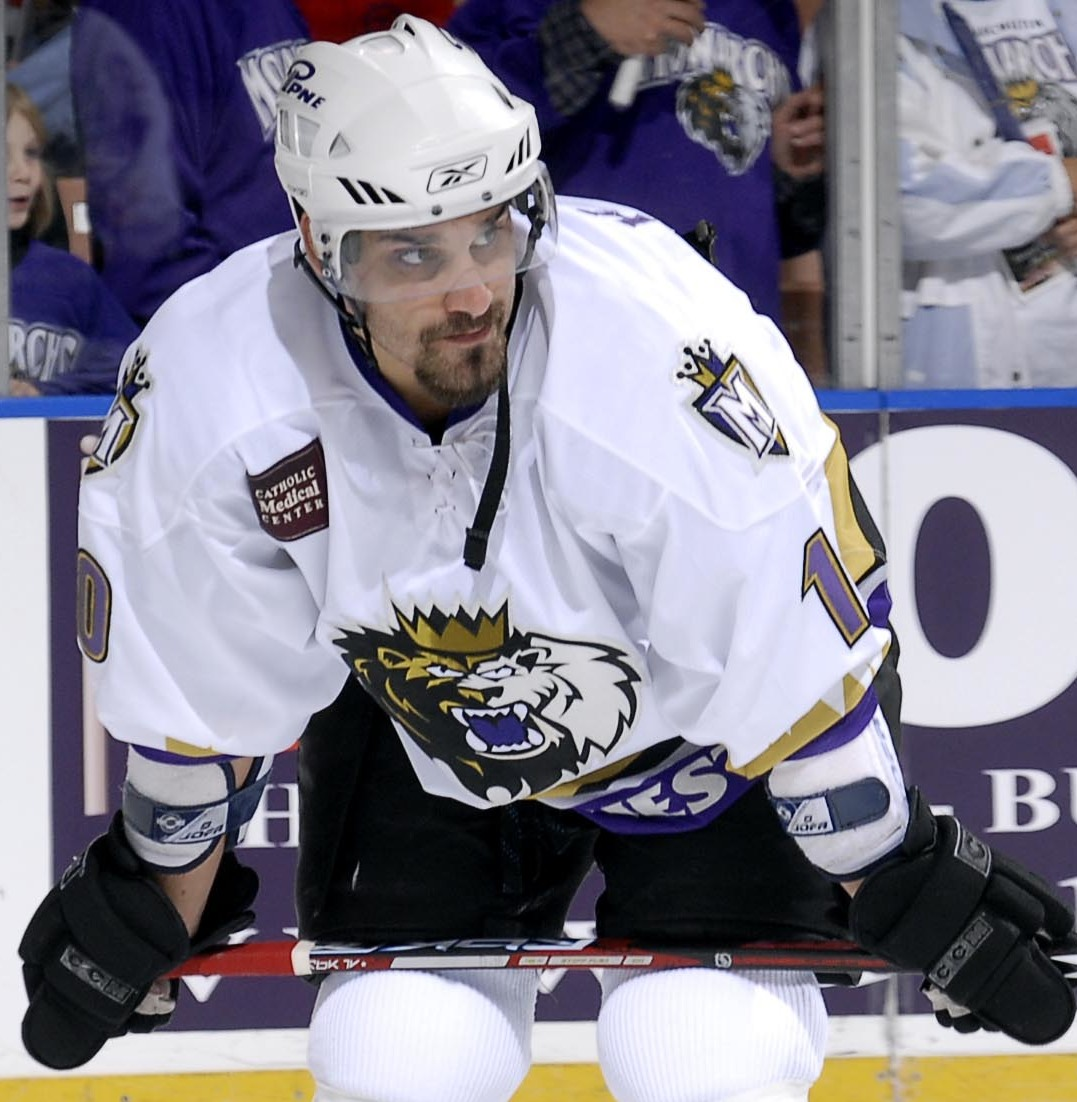
- Kanko with the Manchester Monarchs in 2006
- Born: February 7, 1984 (age 42) Příbram, Czechoslovakia
- Height: 5 ft 10 in (178 cm)
- Weight: 190 lb (86 kg; 13 st 8 lb)
- Position: Right wing
- Shot: Left
- Played for: HC Sparta Praha; Los Angeles Kings; HC Oceláři Třinec; HC Litvinov; Orli Znojmo
- NHL draft: 66th overall, 2002; Los Angeles Kings
- Playing career: 2001–2022

Petr Kanko (born 7 February 1984) is a Czech former ice hockey right winger. He played 10 games in the National Hockey League with the Los Angeles Kings during the 2005–06 season. The rest of his career, which lasted from 2001 to 2022, was mainly spent in the Czech Extraliga and second-tier league.

== Playing career ==
Petr Kanko came to North America in 2001 to play for the Kitchener Rangers of the OHL. He produced for the team right away, and was part of their Memorial Cup winning team of 2003. Five members of that team, including Kanko, have since gone on to play in the NHL. Also, he was drafted 66th overall by the Los Angeles Kings in the 2002 NHL entry draft.

Kanko graduated from the Kitchener Rangers in 2004 after scoring 68 points in 55 games for them. He moved on to the Manchester Monarchs of the AHL. It took him a while to get his bearings in the pros, in part to his small stature, but in the 2005–06 season he played well enough to get called up to the Kings. In his first game in the NHL on 16 December 2005 against the Mighty Ducks of Anaheim, Kanko scored the game-tying goal in the third period that enabled the Kings to advance to the shootout, which they would win to take the game 4–3.

== Career statistics ==
=== Regular season and playoffs ===
			Regular season					Playoffs
Season	Team	League	GP	G	A	Pts	PIM	GP	G	A	Pts	PIM
1999–00	HC Sparta Praha	CZE U18	43	30	28	58	60	7	4	5	9	16
2000–01	HC Sparta Praha	CZE U18	3	5	5	10	4	2	1	0	1	2
2000–01	HC Sparta Praha	CZE U20	38	21	5	26	74	2	1	0	1	2
2000–01	HC Sparta Praha	CZE	6	1	0	1	0	—	—	—	—	—
2001–02	Kitchener Rangers	OHL	61	28	32	60	54	4	0	2	2	0
2002–03	Kitchener Rangers	OHL	60	33	34	67	123	20	11	16	27	17
2002–03	Kitchener Rangers	M-Cup	—	—	—	—	—	4	4	1	5	2
2003–04	Kitchener Rangers	OHL	55	26	42	68	97	5	2	2	4	10
2003–04	Manchester Monarchs	AHL	6	1	3	4	0	6	1	3	4	2
2004–05	Manchester Monarchs	AHL	60	4	14	18	118	6	0	0	0	18
2005–06	Los Angeles Kings	NHL	10	1	0	1	0	—	—	—	—	—
2005–06	Manchester Monarchs	AHL	60	15	12	27	52	7	1	1	2	5
2006–07	Manchester Monarchs	AHL	58	11	8	19	57	11	1	1	2	12
2007–08	Manchester Monarchs	AHL	36	3	4	7	47	4	1	0	1	2
2007–08	Reading Royals	ECHL	1	0	0	0	2	—	—	—	—	—
2008–09	HC Oceláři Třinec	CZE	38	6	12	18	24	3	0	1	1	4
2009–10	HC Oceláři Třinec	CZE	45	3	1	4	32	5	0	0	0	16
2010–11	HC Slovan Ústečtí Lvi	CZE-2	24	3	7	10	65	—	—	—	—	—
2010–11	HC BENZINA Litvínov	CZE	1	0	0	0	0	—	—	—	—	—
2011–12	Orli Znojmo	EBEL	43	7	13	20	70	4	0	1	1	2
2012–13	HC Frýdek–Místek	CZE-3	16	4	7	11	0	—	—	—	—	—
2012–13	HC AZ Havířov 2010	CZE-3	23	10	8	18	30	8	2	5	7	8
2013–14	HC AZ Havířov 2010	CZE-2	39	3	5	8	46	4	2	0	2	2
2014–15	MsHK DOXXbet Žilina	SVK	52	10	13	23	6	—	—	—	—	—
2015–16	HC AZ Havířov 2010	CZE-2	47	25	17	42	10	8	1	4	5	14
2015–16	HC Oceláři Třinec	CZE	1	1	0	1	2	4	1	3	4	2
2016–17	HC Frýdek–Místek	CZE-2	23	6	6	12	12	—	—	—	—	—
2016–17	HC AZ Havířov 2010	CZE-2	28	13	14	27	8	—	—	—	—	—
2017–18	AZ Residomo Havířov	CZE-2	40	8	10	18	12	5	0	0	0	0
2018–19	HC RT TORAX Poruba 2011	CZE-2	53	19	10	29	12	—	—	—	—	—
2018–19	PSG Berani Zlín	CZE	1	0	0	0	0	—	—	—	—	—
2019–20	HC RT TORAX Poruba 2011	CZE-2	57	13	14	27	8	2	0	1	1	0
2020–21	HC RT TORAX Poruba 2011	CZE-2	29	4	10	14	6	11	2	2	4	0
2021–22	HC RT TORAX Poruba 2011	CZE-2	27	0	1	1	4	—	—	—	—	—
CZE-2 totals			367	94	94	188	183	30	5	7	12	16
NHL totals			10	1	0	1	0	—	—	—	—	—

=== International ===
Year	Team	Event	GP	G	A	Pts	PIM
2001	Czech Republic	WJC18	7	6	1	7	4
2004	Czech Republic	WJC	7	1	1	2	4
Junior totals			14	7	2	9	8
