= Kelly Guard =

Canadian ice hockey player

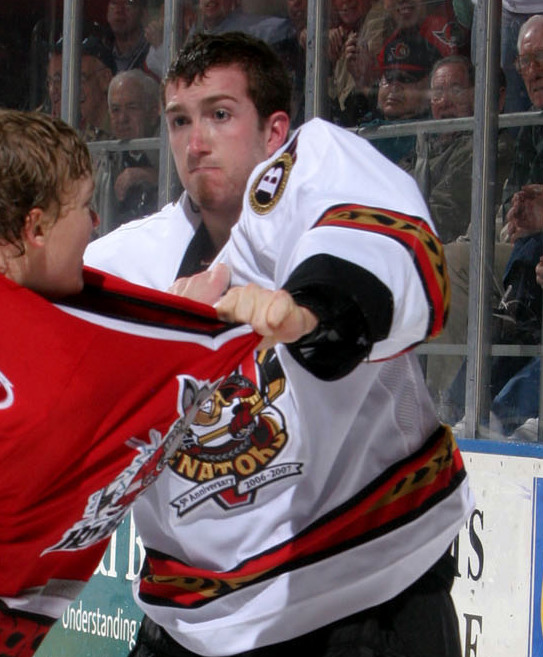
- Guard with the Binghamton Senators in 2006, fighting with Justin Peters of the Albany River Rats
- Born: June 10, 1983 (age 42) Prince Albert, Saskatchewan, Canada
- Height: 6 ft 0 in (183 cm)
- Weight: 186 lb (84 kg; 13 st 4 lb)
- Position: Goaltender
- Caught: Left
- Played for: Charlotte Checkers; Binghamton Senators; Junost Minsk; China Sharks; Vienna Capitals; HC Pustertal-Val Pusteria
- NHL draft: Undrafted
- Playing career: 2004–2008

Kelly Guard (born June 10, 1983) is a Canadian former professional ice hockey goaltender. He last played for HC Pustertal-Val Pusteria in Italy's Serie A. He helped lead the Kelowna Rockets of the Western Hockey League (WHL) to a Memorial Cup championship in 2004. He is currently the goaltending coach for the Edmonton Oilers' American Hockey League (AHL) affiliate the Bakersfield Condors.

== Career ==
=== Playing career ===
Guard was born in Prince Albert, Saskatchewan. He spent his entire junior career with the WHL's Kelowna Rockets. In 2002–03, his first of two seasons with the team, he led the Rockets to a WHL Championship and a berth in the Memorial Cup tournament in Quebec City. The Rockets lost 2–1 to the Hull Olympiques in the semi-final. Guard had another stellar season with the Rockets in 2003–04, posting 44 wins in 62 games. Although Kelowna lost in the third round of the WHL playoffs that season, the city was chosen to host the 2004 Memorial Cup and as such the Rockets received an automatic berth in the tournament. Guard helped lead the team to the franchise's first Memorial Cup Championship as they defeated the Gatineau Olympiques 2–1 in the final. For his efforts, Guard was awarded both the Hap Emms Memorial Trophy and the Stafford Smythe Memorial Trophy as the Memorial Cup's top goaltender and most valuable player, respectively. He was also named to the tournament's First All-Star Team, and to the WHL's First All-Star Team for that season. In all, Guard posted an 83-24 record over his two seasons with Kelowna.

Guard was never selected in the NHL entry draft, but was signed to a professional contract by the National Hockey League's Ottawa Senators in 2004. He made his professional debut during the 2004–05 season playing for Ottawa's ECHL affiliate, the Charlotte Checkers. He spent the following two seasons with Ottawa's top minor league affiliate, the Binghamton Senators of the American Hockey League. He struggled with the team, posting a 36-44-4 record.

The Senators opted not to offer Guard a new contract after the 2006-07 season and the goaltender became a free agent. In November 2007, Guard signed with the China Sharks of Asia League Ice Hockey, though his stint with the team was brief. He had similarly brief stints with the Vienna Capitals of Erste Bank Eishockey Liga and Junost Minsk of the Belarusian Extraleague before signing with Serie A's HC Pustertal-Val Pusteria.

After sustaining a groin injury in an October 2008 game, Guard's contract with Pustertal-Val Pusteria was terminated by mutual consent. Although he said that "the city, the environment and the teammates were outstanding," Guard was disappointed with the level of play in Serie A and, already contemplating retirement, the injury helped make his decision final. In November, Guard announced his retirement from professional hockey.

=== Post-playing career ===
==== Coaching ====
===== Junior hockey =====
In 2012, Guard joined the Prince Albert Raiders coaching staff as their goaltending coach. He also served as assistant coach from 2014-2016.

On November 12, 2021, Hockey Canada announced the rosters for three men's under-17 teams for the Capital City Challenge. Guard was named goaltending coach for Canada White. The Capital City Challenge served as a one-time event to replace to the World U-17 Hockey Challenge, which was cancelled due to the COVID-19 pandemic. It also gave an opportunity to the Canada's National Women's Team to compete as part of its centralization schedule.

On June 15, 2022, Hockey Canada announced 20 Canadian Hockey League (CHL) coaches for their under-17 and under-18 summer programs, camps, and various events. Guard was selected as the goaltending coach for the under-18 side that competed at the Hlinka Gretzky Cup.

In November 2022, Guard was named goaltending coach for Team Canada at the 2023 World Junior Ice Hockey Championships where they beat the Czech Republic for the gold.

===== Professional =====
On July 25, 2024, it was announced that Kelly Guard would be joining the Edmonton Oilers' AHL affiliate, the Bakersfield Condors, as their goaltending coach.

== Regular season and playoffs ==
			Regular season									Playoffs
Season	Team	League	GP	W	L	OTL	MIN	GA	SO	GAA	SV%	GP	W	L	MIN	GA	SO	GAA	SV%
2002–03	Kelowna Rockets	WHL	53	39	10	3	3018	97	6	1.93	.911	19	16	3	1233	36	4	1.75	.917
2003–04	Kelowna Rockets	WHL	62	44	14	4	3652	95	13	1.56	.925	17	11	6	1042	31	1	1.78	.919
2004–05	Charlotte Checkers	ECHL	26	12	2	0	1453	74	0	3.06	.901	2	0	0	34	1	0	1.52	.933
2005–06	Binghamton Senators	AHL	51	25	20	1	2709	139	5	3.08	.908	—	—	—	—	—	—	—	—
2006–07	Binghamton Senators	AHL	42	11	24	3	2330	127	2	3.42	.895	—	—	—	—	—	—	—	—
2007–08	China Sharks	ALIH	2	1	1	0	120	6	0	3.00	—	—	—	—	—	—	—	—	—
AHL totals			93	36	44	4	5039	266	7	3.17	.902	—	—	—	—	—	—	—	—
WHL totals			115	83	24	7	6670	192	19	1.73	.915	36	27	9	2275	67	5	1.77	.918

== Awards ==
Award	Year(s)	Ref.
WHL
West First All-Star Team	2003 and 2004	
Memorial Cup
Stafford Smythe Memorial Trophy - Memorial Cup MVP	2004	
Hap Emms Memorial Trophy - Memorial Cup Outstanding Goaltender	2004	

== Records ==
Stat	Year(s)	Ref.
WHL
Lowest GAA in a season - 1.56	2003-04	
Lowest GAA of all-time - 1.73	2003-04	
Kelowna Rockets
Most wins in a season - 44	2003-04	
Most shutouts in a season - 13	2003-04	
Most shutouts of all-time - 19	2002-04	
Lowest GAA in a season - 1.56	2003-04	
Lowest GAA of all-time - 1.73	2002-04	
Memorial Cup
Best GAA - 0.75	Kelowna Rockets, 2004	
