= Ed Chynoweth Trophy =

Annual ice hockey award in Canada

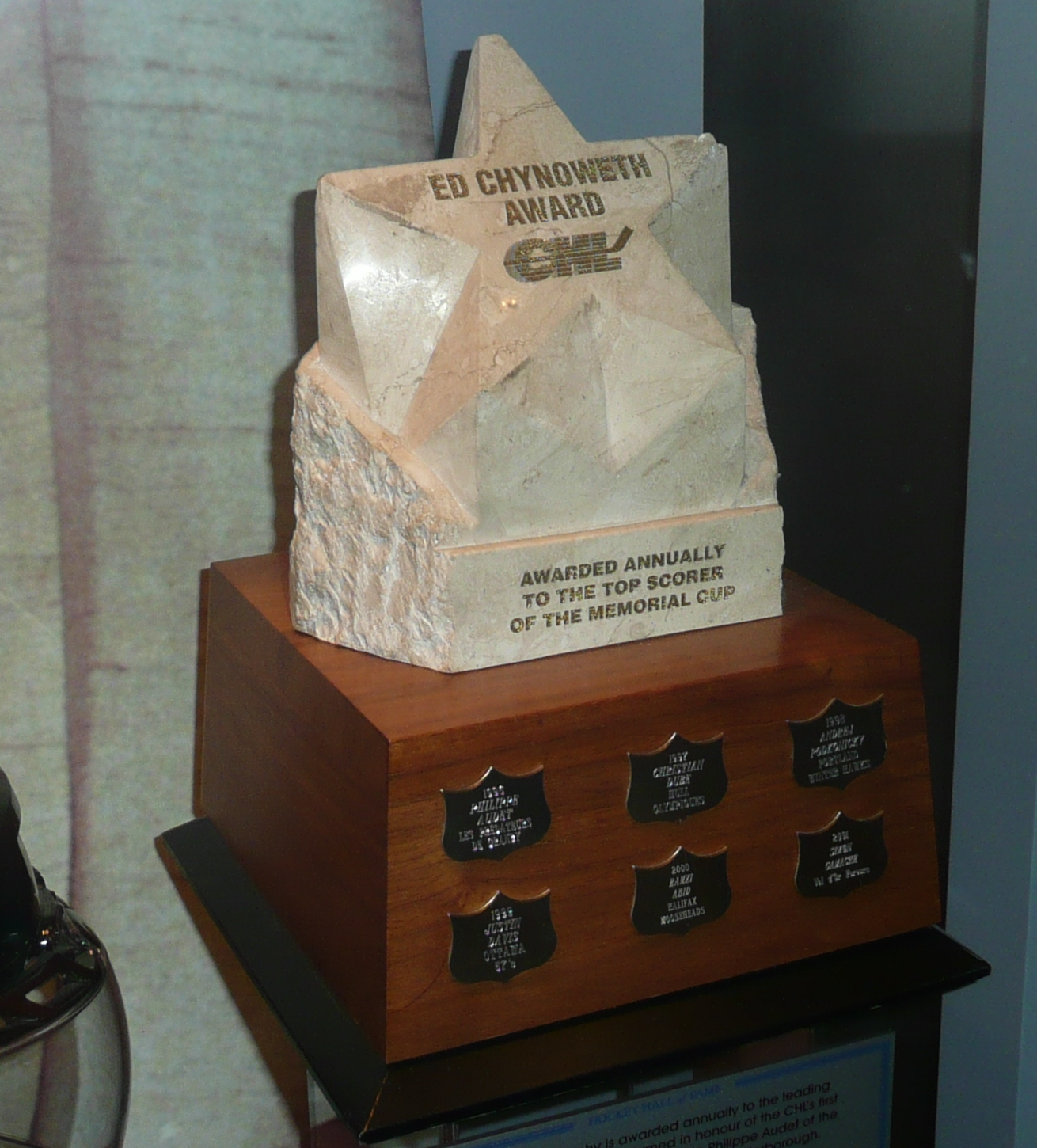
- Sport: Ice hockey
- Awarded for: Top scorer in the Memorial Cup

History
- First award: 1996
- Most recent: Easton Cowan and Denver Barkey

The Ed Chynoweth Trophy is awarded to the leading scorer at the Memorial Cup tournament. It was first awarded in 1996. In the case of a tie in points, the award is given to the player with the fewest games played. Should players tied in points have played the same number of games, the award goes to the player with the most goals scored.

Amongst the three leagues, a player from the Quebec Maritimes Junior Hockey League (QMJHL) has won the award eleven times, while players representing the Ontario Hockey League (OHL) have won the award nine times and the Western Hockey League (WHL) eight times. Players from the OHL's London Knights have won the award three times, the most of any team. Five other teams have twice had one of their players win the award: the QMJHL's Hull/Gatineau Olympiques and Halifax Mooseheads, the OHL's Kitchener Rangers, and the WHL's Vancouver Giants and Kelowna Rockets. Mitch Marner has the highest winning total for the award with 14 points, though he falls short of the tournament record of 16 points set by Jeff Larmer of the Kitchener Rangers in 1982 and Guy Rouleau of the Olympiques in 1986. Easton Cowan is the first player to win the award more than once, winning consecutively in 2024 and 2025.

The trophy is named after Ed Chynoweth, who was the president of the WHL from 1972 to 1996. He helped create the Canadian Hockey League (CHL) and served as its president from 1975 until 1996. Chynoweth was instrumental in the creation of the CHL, and as its president, he helped create Canadian junior hockey's scholarship program and organized the Memorial Cup into a tournament format. Chynoweth stepped down as WHL and CHL president in 1996 when he was awarded a WHL expansion franchise, the Edmonton Ice, a franchise he operated until his death in 2008. He was inducted into the Hockey Hall of Fame shortly after his death.

== Winners ==
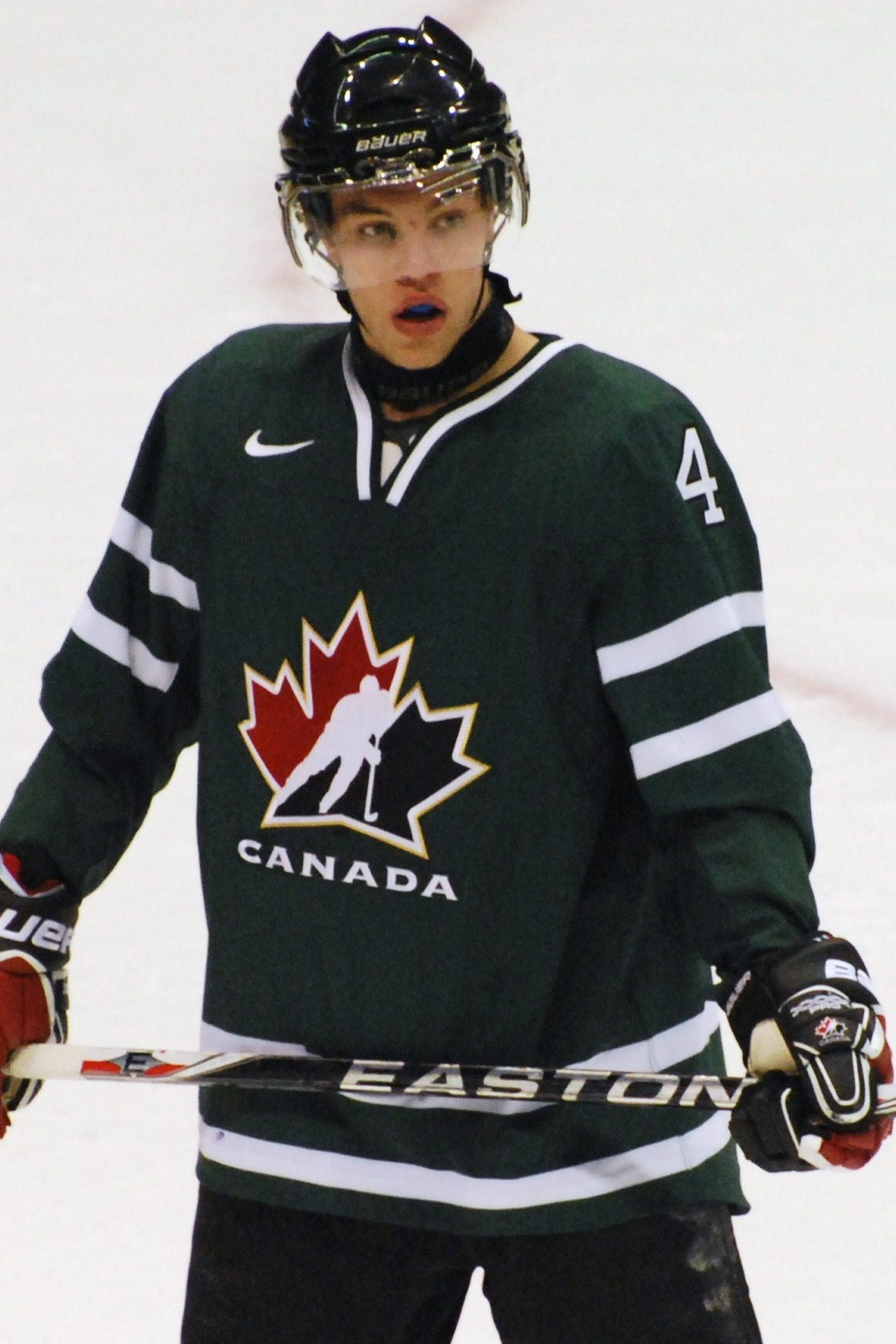
Taylor Hall was the leading scorer in 2010 with nine points.

Tournament	Winner	Team	Points
1996	Philippe Audet	Granby Prédateurs	8 (4g, 4a)
1997	Christian Dubé	Hull Olympiques	13 (6g, 7a)
1998	Andrej Podkonicky	Portland Winter Hawks	10 (6g, 4a)
1999	Justin Davis	Ottawa 67's	9 (3g, 6a)
2000	Ramzi Abid	Halifax Mooseheads	10 (6g, 4a)
2001	Simon Gamache	Val-d'Or Foreurs	7 (4g, 3a)
2002	Matthew Lombardi	Victoriaville Tigres	9 (2g, 7a)
2003	Gregory Campbell	Kitchener Rangers	7 (1g, 6a)
2004	Doug O'Brien	Gatineau Olympiques	8 (3g, 5a)
2005	Sidney Crosby	Rimouski Océanic	11 (6g, 5a)
2006	Gilbert Brulé	Vancouver Giants	12 (6g, 6a)
2007	Michal Repik	Vancouver Giants	7 (3g, 4a)
2008	Justin Azevedo	Kitchener Rangers	11 (4g, 7a)
2009	Jamie Benn	Kelowna Rockets	9 (5g, 4a)
2010	Taylor Hall	Windsor Spitfires	9 (5g, 4a)
2011	Andrew Shaw	Owen Sound Attack	7 (2g, 5a)
2012	Michael Chaput	Shawinigan Cataractes	12 (5g, 7a)
2013	Nathan MacKinnon	Halifax Mooseheads	13 (7g, 6a)
2014	Henrik Samuelsson	Edmonton Oil Kings	8 (4g, 4a)
2015	Leon Draisaitl	Kelowna Rockets	7 (4g, 3a)
2016	Mitch Marner	London Knights	14 (2g, 12a)
2017	Dylan Strome	Erie Otters	11 (7g, 4a)
2018	Sam Steel	Regina Pats	13 (2g, 11a)
2019	Jakub Lauko	Rouyn-Noranda Huskies	8 (2g, 6a)
2020	Event cancelled due to the coronavirus pandemic – trophy not awarded		
2021	Event cancelled due to the coronavirus pandemic – trophy not awarded		
2022	William Dufour	Saint John Sea Dogs	8 (7g, 1a)
2023	Logan Stankoven	Kamloops Blazers	9 (2g, 7a)
2024	Easton Cowan	London Knights	8 (3g, 5a)
2025	Easton Cowan	London Knights	7 (3g, 4a)
2025	Denver Barkey	London Knights	7 (3g, 4a)
2026	Jack Pridham	Kitchener Rangers	9 (5g, 4a)

== See also ==
- List of Canadian Hockey League awards
