= 2002 Memorial Cup =

Canadian junior men's ice hockey championship

2002 Mastercard Memorial Cup

Tournament details
- Venue(s): Guelph Sports and Entertainment Centre; Guelph, Ontario
- Dates: May 18–26, 2002
- Teams: 4
- Host team: Guelph Storm (OHL)
- TV partner(s): Rogers Sportsnet

Final positions
- Champions: Kootenay Ice (WHL) (1st title)

Tournament statistics
- Games played: 8
- Attendance: 45,144 (5,643 per game)

The Memorial Cup trophy

The 2002 Memorial Cup occurred May 18–26 at the Guelph Sports and Entertainment Centre in Guelph, Ontario. It was the 84th annual Memorial Cup competition and determined the major junior ice hockey champion of the Canadian Hockey League (CHL). It featured the host team, the Guelph Storm, as well as the winners of the Ontario Hockey League, Quebec Major Junior Hockey League and the Western Hockey League: the Erie Otters, Victoriaville Tigres and the Kootenay Ice respectively. The Kootenay Ice won their first Memorial Cup, beating the Victoriaville Tigres in the final.

== Round-robin standings ==
Pos	Team	Pld	W	L	GF	GA
1	Kootenay Ice (WHL)	3	2	1	9	6
1	Erie Otters (OHL)	3	2	1	9	4
3	Guelph Storm (host)	3	1	2	8	9
3	Victoriaville Tigres (QMJHL) (Note: Victoriaville won the tiebreaker against Guelph to advance to the semi-finals)	3	1	2	5	12

== Scores ==
- May 18: Guelph 5–1 Victoriaville
- May 19: Kootenay 3–0 Erie
- May 20: Kootenay 4–3 Guelph
- May 21: Erie 5–1 Victoriaville
- May 22: Victoriaville 3–2 Kootenay
- May 23: Erie 4–0 Guelph

Tie-breaker

- May 24: Victoriaville 4–3 Guelph

Semi-final

- May 25: Victoriaville 5–4 Erie (OT)

Final

- May 26: Kootenay 6–3 Victoriaville

== Winning team ==
Igor Agarunov, Bryan Bridges, B. J. Boxma, Nigel Dawes, Gerard Dicaire, Brennan Evans, Cole Fischer, Curtis Fransoo, Travis Featherstone, Richard Hamula, Chris LaValley, Dale Mahovsky, Steve Makway, Duncan Milroy, Shaun Norrie, Tomas Plihal, Kyle Sheen, Colin Sinclair, Jarret Stoll, Marek Svatos, Adam Taylor, Andy Thompson, Craig Weller. Coach: Ryan McGill

== Scoring leaders ==
1. Matthew Lombardi, VIC (2g 7a) 9p
2. Cory Pecker, ER (4g 3a) 7p
3. Danny Groulx, VIC (2g 5a) 7p
4. Carl Malette, VIC (5g 1a) 6p
5. Colin Sinclair, KOO (4g 2a) 6p
6. Kevin Dallman, GUE (1g 5a) 6p
7. Brad Boyes, ER (2g 3a) 5p
8. Brandon Cullen, ER (2g 3a) 5p
9. Marek Svatos, KOO, (1g 4a) 5p
10. Jarret Stoll, KOO (0g 5a) 5p

== Goaltending leaders ==
1. T. J. Aceti, ER (1.91 gaa, 0.942 sv%)
2. B. J. Boxma, KOO (2.25 gaa, 0.900 sv%)
3. Daniel Manzato, VIC (2.79 gaa, 0.943 sv%)
4. Andrew Penner, GUE (3.25 gaa, 0.873 sv%)
5. Daniel Boisclair, VIC (4.22 gaa, 0.880 sv%)

== Award winners ==
- Stafford Smythe Memorial Trophy (MVP): Danny Groulx, Victoriaville
- George Parsons Trophy (Sportsmanship): Tomas Plihal, Kootenay
- Hap Emms Memorial Trophy (Goaltender): T. J. Aceti, Erie
- Ed Chynoweth Trophy (Leading Scorer): Matthew Lombardi, Victoriaville

All-Star Team

- Goal: T. J. Aceti (Erie)
- Defence: Danny Groulx (Victoriaville), Kevin Dallman (Guelph)
- Forwards: Matthew Lombardi (Victoriaville), Colin Sinclair (Kootenay), Cory Pecker (Erie)
