= 2003 Memorial Cup =

Canadian junior men's ice hockey championship

2003 Mastercard Memorial Cup

Tournament details
- Venue(s): Colisée Pepsi; Quebec City, Quebec
- Dates: May 17–25, 2003
- Teams: 4
- Host team: Quebec Remparts (QMJHL)
- TV partner(s): Rogers Sportsnet

Final positions
- Champions: Kitchener Rangers (OHL) (2nd title)

Tournament statistics
- Games played: 8
- Attendance: 84,686 (10,586 per game)

The Memorial Cup trophy

The 2003 Memorial Cup (branded as the 2003 Mastercard Memorial Cup for sponsorship reasons) occurred May 17–25 at the Colisée Pepsi in Quebec City, Quebec. It was the 85th annual Memorial Cup competition and determined the major junior ice hockey champion of the Canadian Hockey League (CHL). It featured the host team, the Quebec Remparts, as well as the winners of the Ontario Hockey League, Quebec Major Junior Hockey League and the Western Hockey League, which were the Kitchener Rangers, Hull Olympiques and the Kelowna Rockets respectively. The Kitchener Rangers won their second ever Memorial Cup, their first being in 1982. They beat the Hull Olympiques in the final, who were trying to win their first Memorial Cup since 1997 when they won it on home ice.

== Round-robin standings ==
Pos	Team	Pld	W	L	GF	GA
1	Kitchener Rangers (OHL)	3	3	0	12	6
2	Hull Olympiques (QMJHL)	3	2	1	10	8
3	Kelowna Rockets (WHL)	3	1	2	6	10
4	Quebec Remparts (host)	3	0	3	8	12

== Scores ==
- May 17: Kitchener 4–3 Quebec
- May 18: Hull 4–1 Kelowna
- May 19: Kelowna 3–2 Quebec
- May 20: Kitchener 4–1 Hull
- May 21: Kitchener 4–2 Kelowna
- May 22: Hull 5–3 Quebec

Semi-final

- May 24: Hull 2–1 Kelowna

Final

- May 25: Kitchener 6–3 Hull

== Winning team ==
Andre Benoit, Jesse Boucher, Gregory Campbell, Mike Chmielewski, David Clarkson, Scott Dickie, Carlo DiRienzo, Nick Duff, T. J. Eason, Steve Eminger, Cam Fergus, Matt Grennier, George Halkidis, Thomas Harrison, Kevin Hurley, Petr Kanko, Adam Keefe, Matt Manias, Rafal Martynowski, Chad McCaffrey, Matt McCann, Paul McFarland, Evan McGrath, Nathan O'Nabigon, Mike Richards, Derek Roy (Captain), Marcus Smith. Head Coach: Peter DeBoer

== Scoring leaders ==
1. Gregory Campbell, KIT (1g, 6a, 7pts)
2. Jean-Michel Daoust, HUL (2g, 4a, 6pts)
3. Andre Benoit, KIT (1g, 5a, 6pts)
4. Petr Kanko, KIT (4g, 1a, 5pts)
5. Mathieu Brunelle, HUL (3g, 2a, 5pts)
6. Mike Richards, KIT (2g, 3a, 5pts)
7. Jesse Schultz, KEL (1g, 4a, 5pts)
8. Derek Roy, KIT (3g, 1a, 4pts)
9. Evan McGrath, KIT (2g, 2a, 4pts)
10. Kiel McLeod, KEL (2g, 2a, 4pts)

== Goaltending leaders ==
1. Scott Dickie, KIT (2.25 gaa, 0.911 sv%)
2. Eric Lafrance, HUL (3.00 gaa, 0.907 sv%)
3. Kelly Guard, KEL (3.02 gaa, 0.862 sv%)
4. Jean-Michel Filiatrault, QUE (3.71 gaa, 0.894 sv%)
5. Michael Kim, KEL (2.21 gaa, 0.931 sv%)

== Award winners ==
- Stafford Smythe Memorial Trophy (MVP): Derek Roy, Kitchener
- George Parsons Trophy (Sportsmanship): Gregory Campbell, Kitchener
- Hap Emms Memorial Trophy (Goaltender): Scott Dickie, Kitchener
- Ed Chynoweth Trophy (Leading Scorer): Gregory Campbell, Kitchener

All-star team

- Goal: Scott Dickie, Kitchener
- Defence: Steve Eminger, Kitchener; Doug O'Brien, Hull
- Forwards: Derek Roy, Kitchener; Gregory Campbell, Kitchener; Mike Richards, Kitchener
