= Derek Roy =

Canadian ice hockey player (born 1983)

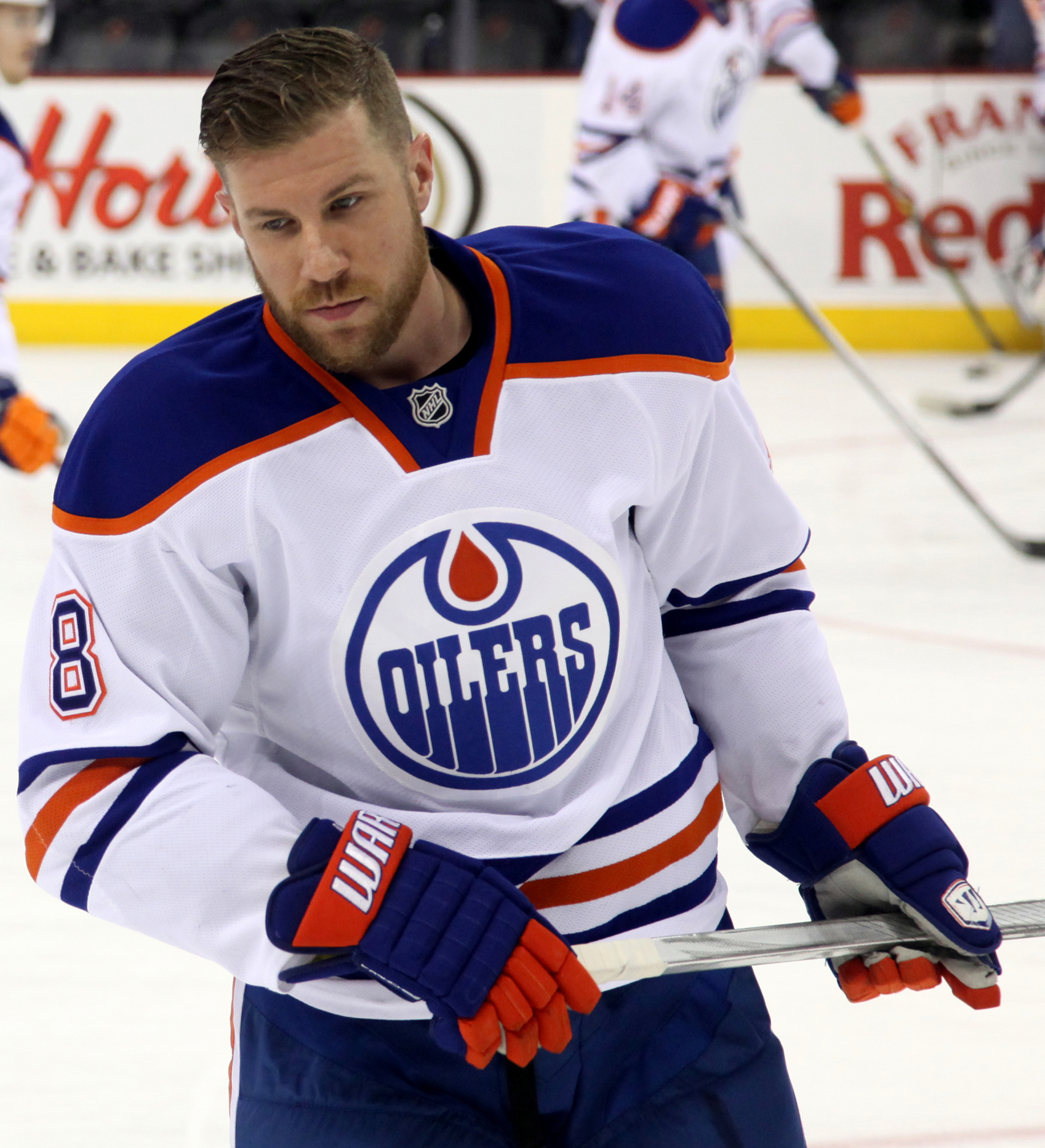
- Roy with the Edmonton Oilers in 2015
- Born: May 4, 1983 (age 43) Rockland, Ontario, Canada
- Height: 5 ft 9 in (175 cm)
- Weight: 184 lb (83 kg; 13 st 2 lb)
- Position: Centre
- Shot: Left
- Played for: Buffalo Sabres; Dallas Stars; Vancouver Canucks; St. Louis Blues; Nashville Predators; Edmonton Oilers; SC Bern; Avangard Omsk; Traktor Chelyabinsk; Linköpings HC; EHC München
- National team: Canada
- NHL draft: 32nd overall, 2001; Buffalo Sabres
- Playing career: 2003–2021

Derek Leonard Roy (born May 4, 1983) is a Canadian former professional ice hockey centre who played in the National Hockey League (NHL) with the Buffalo Sabres, Dallas Stars, Vancouver Canucks, St. Louis Blues, Nashville Predators and the Edmonton Oilers. He was originally drafted in the second round, 32nd overall, by the Buffalo Sabres in the 2001 NHL entry draft.

== Playing career ==
=== Junior ===
Roy led the Kitchener Rangers of the Ontario Hockey League (OHL) with 87 points during the 1999–2000 season, and won the OHL Rookie of the Year trophy. The next season, he scored 42 goals and 81 points whereupon he was drafted 32nd overall by the Buffalo Sabres in the 2001 NHL entry draft at the end of the season. The next season, 2001–02 Roy set his OHL career highs of 43 goals and 89 points and continued to be the Rangers' leading scorer.

In the Fall of 2002, Roy played for the Sabres in their pre-season games. Despite his strong showing, he returned to the Rangers for the 2002–03 season, his last in the OHL. Roy captained the Rangers to an OHL championship, amassing 32 points in 21 playoff games en route to also capturing the Memorial Cup, where he also won the Stafford Smythe Memorial Trophy as the tournament's MVP.

=== Buffalo Sabres ===
Roy began the 2003–04 season with the Sabres' then-minor league affiliate, the Rochester Americans in the American Hockey League (AHL). After scoring at a point-per-game pace after 26 games with the Americans, he was called up to the NHL and played the majority of the season in Buffalo, tallying 19 points in his 49-game rookie season.

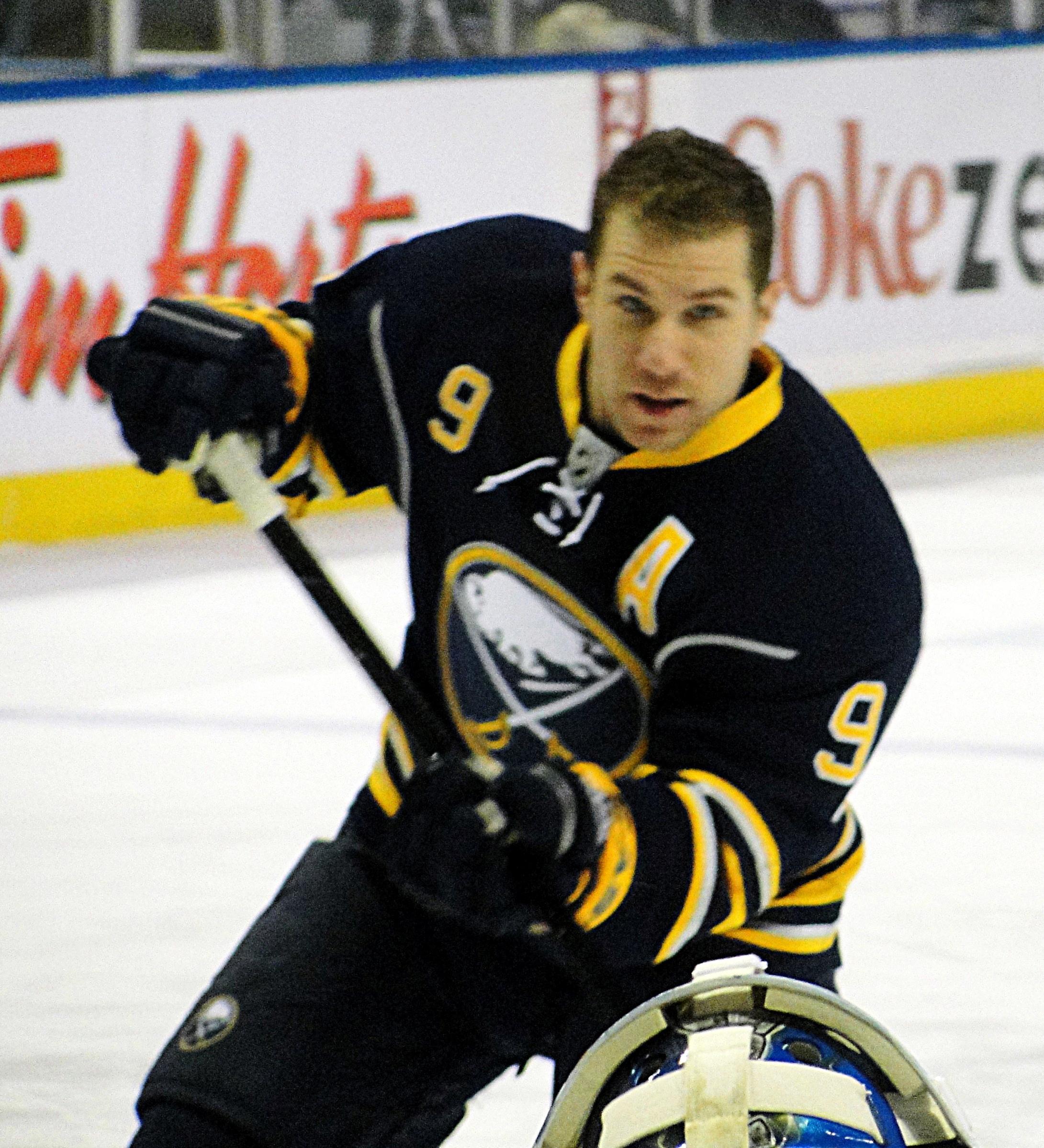
Roy with the Sabres in 2012.

Roy was back with the Americans the next season due to the 2004–05 NHL lock-out. He failed to make the Sabres out of training camp when NHL play resumed in 2005–06. After scoring 20 points in eight games with the Americans, including multiple five-point performances, he was recalled to the Sabres. He finished the season with his first two NHL hat-tricks on March 3, 2006, against the Toronto Maple Leafs and March 9 against the Tampa Bay Lightning, respectively. Roy then complemented a 46-point second-year season with 15 points in the 2006 Stanley Cup playoffs as the Sabres advanced to the Eastern Conference Finals, but lost to the eventual Stanley Cup champions, the Carolina Hurricanes.

In 2006–07, Roy improved to 63 points as the Sabres captured the Presidents' Trophy with the NHL's best regular season record. Meeting the Ottawa Senators in the Sabres' second consecutive Eastern Conference Finals appearance, Roy scored the fastest goal to start a playoff game in franchise history, nine seconds into Game 4 (the League record was previously six seconds). After the Sabres were eliminated by the Senators, Roy agreed to a six-year, $24 million contract extension with the Sabres on July 27, 2007.

In his first season under the new contract, Roy led the Sabres in points (81) and was second in goals (32) and assists (49). With the departures of co-captains Chris Drury and Daniel Brière to the New York Rangers and Philadelphia Flyers, respectively, the Sabres failed to make the 2008 playoffs.

During the 2010–11 season, after leading the Sabres in points for the first 35 games, Roy suffered a torn quad tendon that would put him out for the rest of the regular season. He would return for just the seventh game of the Sabres' Eastern Conference Quarterfinal series against Philadelphia, which would prove to be the last game of their season.

=== Later years ===
Approaching the last year of his contract, on July 2, 2012, Roy was traded by the Sabres to the Dallas Stars in exchange for Steve Ott and Adam Pardy. Due to the effect of the 2012–13 NHL lock-out, Roy played in just 30 games with the Stars in the 2012–13 season before, on April 2, 2013, he was traded to the Vancouver Canucks in exchange for prospect Kevin Connauton and a second-round draft pick in 2013. Roy registered an assist in his first game as a Canuck, against the Edmonton Oilers.

Left to explore free agency by the Canucks, on July 6, 2013, Roy and the St. Louis Blues agreed in principle to a one-year, $4 million contract. On July 11, he officially signed the deal.

After a single season with the Blues, Roy was again a free agent, whereupon he signed a one-year, $1 million contract with the Nashville Predators on July 15, 2014. Well into the 2014–15 season, on December 29, 2014, he was then traded to the Edmonton Oilers in exchange for Mark Arcobello.

Roy was offered a Professional Try-Out contract with the Washington Capitals during the preseason of the 2015–16 season, but was cut after the last game of the preseason, whereupon he signed with Swiss club SC Bern of the NLA on October 9, 2015. He won the Swiss championship with Bern that season. He played 36 regular season contests for SCB with nine goals and 21 assists. In the playoffs, he scored three goals, including the championship-winning goal, to go along with nine assists in 13 games.

In July 2016, he signed with HK Avangard Omsk of the Kontinental Hockey League (KHL). During the 2016–17 season, Roy was traded by Avangard to Traktor Chelyabinsk on November 1, 2016, in exchange for Daniil Gubarev.

== International play ==
Medal record

Ice hockey

Representing Canada

Olympic Games
Bronze medal – third place	2018 Pyeongchang	

Spengler Cup
Gold medal – first place	2015 Davos	

In Roy's last year of major junior hockey, he was selected to play for Canada at the 2003 World Junior Ice Hockey Championships where he helped Canada win a silver medal.

Roy made his next international appearance at the 2008 World Championships with Canada's men's team. In the quarter-finals, he scored a hat-trick against Norway in an 8–2 win. Roy earned another silver medal with Canada as they were defeated in overtime of the gold medal game by Russia.

Roy was also selected for the 2010 Winter Olympics summer roster for Canada in August 2009, though he did not make the final roster cut.

In December 2015, he was a member of Team Canada that won the Spengler Cup. The following year, Roy was a member of Team Canada at the 2016 Deutschland Cup.

In 2018, Roy was announced as a member of the 2018 Canadian men's national ice hockey team for the 2018 Winter Olympics in Pyeongchang. Roy and Maxim Noreau were the leading scorers as Canada finished with a bronze medal.

== Personal life ==
Roy is a native of Rockland, Ontario. He used to sponsor the minor hockey team in Clarence Creek, the "Clarence Castors"; he would supply the players with sticks. Roy is bilingual, and can speak English and French.

== Career statistics ==
=== Regular season and playoffs ===
			Regular season					Playoffs
Season	Team	League	GP	G	A	Pts	PIM	GP	G	A	Pts	PIM
1999–00	Kitchener Rangers	OHL	66	34	53	87	44	5	4	1	5	6
2000–01	Kitchener Rangers	OHL	65	42	39	81	114	—	—	—	—	—
2001–02	Kitchener Rangers	OHL	62	43	46	89	92	4	1	2	3	2
2002–03	Kitchener Rangers	OHL	49	28	50	78	73	21	9	23	32	14
2003–04	Rochester Americans	AHL	26	10	16	26	20	16	6	8	14	18
2003–04	Buffalo Sabres	NHL	49	9	10	19	12	—	—	—	—	—
2004–05	Rochester Americans	AHL	67	16	45	61	60	9	6	5	11	6
2005–06	Rochester Americans	AHL	8	7	13	20	10	—	—	—	—	—
2005–06	Buffalo Sabres	NHL	70	18	28	46	57	18	5	10	15	16
2006–07	Buffalo Sabres	NHL	75	21	42	63	60	16	2	5	7	14
2007–08	Buffalo Sabres	NHL	78	32	49	81	46	—	—	—	—	—
2008–09	Buffalo Sabres	NHL	82	28	42	70	38	—	—	—	—	—
2009–10	Buffalo Sabres	NHL	80	26	43	69	48	6	0	2	2	2
2010–11	Buffalo Sabres	NHL	35	10	25	35	16	1	0	1	1	0
2011–12	Buffalo Sabres	NHL	80	17	27	44	54	—	—	—	—	—
2012–13	Dallas Stars	NHL	30	4	18	22	4	—	—	—	—	—
2012–13	Vancouver Canucks	NHL	12	3	3	6	2	4	0	1	1	2
2013–14	St. Louis Blues	NHL	75	9	28	37	30	4	0	1	1	0
2014–15	Nashville Predators	NHL	26	1	9	10	2	—	—	—	—	—
2014–15	Edmonton Oilers	NHL	46	11	11	22	22	—	—	—	—	—
2015–16	SC Bern	NLA	36	9	21	30	26	13	3	9	12	42
2016–17	Avangard Omsk	KHL	21	5	7	12	20	—	—	—	—	—
2016–17	Traktor Chelyabinsk	KHL	34	6	4	10	24	6	0	2	2	4
2017–18	Linköpings HC	SHL	45	12	23	35	24	7	2	5	7	8
2018–19	Linköpings HC	SHL	49	8	34	42	28	—	—	—	—	—
2019–20	EHC Red Bull München	DEL	10	0	7	7	8	—	—	—	—	—
2020–21	EHC Red Bull München	DEL	12	4	5	9	4	2	0	0	0	0
NHL totals			738	189	335	524	391	49	7	20	27	36

=== International ===
Year	Team	Event	Result	GP	G	A	Pts	PIM
2000	Canada Ontario	U17	2nd place, silver medalist(s)	6	3	5	8	4
2000	Canada	U18	1st place, gold medalist(s)	3	0	2	2	4
2003	Canada	WJC	2nd place, silver medalist(s)	6	1	2	3	4
2008	Canada	WC	2nd place, silver medalist(s)	9	5	5	10	6
2009	Canada	WC	2nd place, silver medalist(s)	9	4	4	8	4
2018	Canada	OG	3rd place, bronze medalist(s)	6	2	5	7	8
Junior totals				15	4	9	13	12
Senior totals				24	11	14	25	18

== Awards ==
- Named to the OHL All-Rookie Team (2000)
- Awarded the Emms Family Award as OHL Rookie of the Year (2000)
- Named to the CHL All-Rookie Team (2000)
- Awarded CHL Plus/Minus Award (2000)
- Awarded the Wayne Gretzky 99 Award as OHL playoff MVP (2003)
- Named to the Memorial Cup All-Star Team (2003)
- Awarded Stafford Smythe Memorial Trophy as Memorial Cup MVP (2003)
- Played in the NHL YoungStars Game (2004)
