= Doug O'Brien =

Canadian ice hockey player

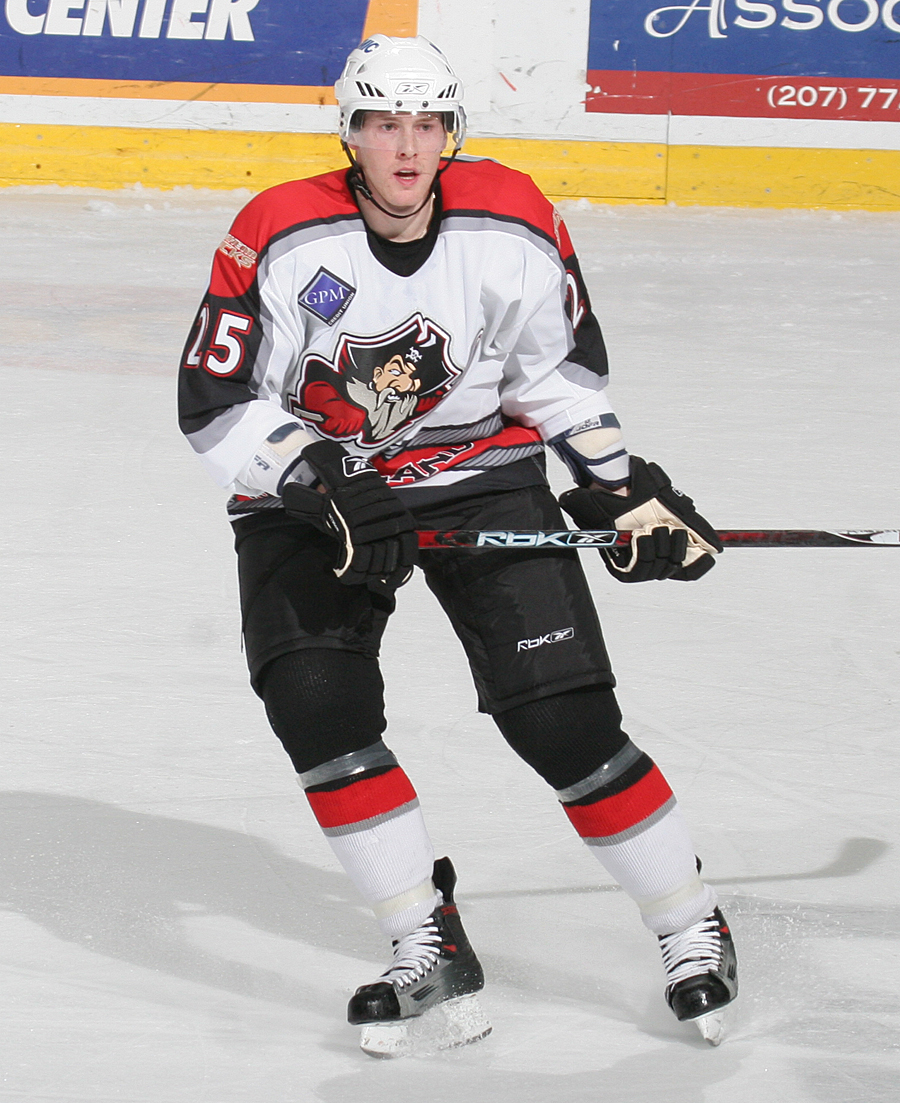
- O'Brien with the Portland Pirates in 2007
- Born: February 16, 1984 (age 42) St. John's, Newfoundland, Canada
- Height: 6 ft 1 in (185 cm)
- Weight: 200 lb (91 kg; 14 st 4 lb)
- Position: Defence
- Shot: Left
- Played for: Tampa Bay Lightning; Lukko; Plzeň; Sparta Praha
- NHL draft: 192nd overall, 2003; Tampa Bay Lightning
- Playing career: 2004–2011

Doug O'Brien (born February 16, 1984) is a Canadian former professional ice hockey defenceman who played five games in the National Hockey League with the Tampa Bay Lightning.

== Playing career ==
O'Brien was drafted 192nd overall in the 6th round of the 2003 NHL entry draft by the Lightning. O'Brien played four seasons of major junior hockey for the Hull/Gatineau Olympiques of the Quebec Major Junior Hockey League (QMJHL) before turning professional. In the 2003–04 season with the Olympiques, Doug recorded 63 points in 66 games and was named the league's top defenceman.

O'Brien made his professional debut with the Lightning's affiliate, the Springfield Falcons of the AHL in the 2004–05 season. At the end of the 2005–06 season, O'Brien made his NHL debut with the Lightning, featuring in 5 games.

Unable to secure a place with the Lightning for the 2006–07 season, O'Brien was assigned to the Falcons. On February 27, 2007, O'Brien was traded by the Lightning to the Anaheim Ducks for Joe Rullier he was then sent to affiliate, the Portland Pirates, for the duration of the season.

A free agent upon the 2007–08 season, O'Brien signed with Finnish team Lukko Rauma of the SM-liiga. He returned to North America when he signed with the Rochester Americans of the AHL on September 5, 2008. After playing in 12 games with the Amerks in the 2008–09 season, O'Brien was demoted to their affiliate, the Florida Everblades of the ECHL on November 11, 2009.

O'Brien signed with Czech Republic team, Plzeň of the Czech Extraliga for the 2009–10 season. He joined Sparta Praha the following season before leaving professional hockey in 2011.

== Career statistics ==
			Regular season					Playoffs
Season	Team	League	GP	G	A	Pts	PIM	GP	G	A	Pts	PIM
2000–01	Hull Olympiques	QMJHL	47	1	6	7	16	5	0	1	1	0
2001–02	Hull Olympiques	QMJHL	46	1	5	6	36	12	0	0	0	14
2002–03	Hull Olympiques	QMJHL	71	10	34	44	102	19	3	12	15	18
2003–04	Gatineau Olympiques	QMJHL	66	17	46	63	146	15	1	8	9	16
2004–05	Springfield Falcons	AHL	74	4	13	17	76	—	—	—	—	—
2004–05	Johnstown Chiefs	ECHL	3	0	0	0	2	—	—	—	—	—
2005–06	Springfield Falcons	AHL	74	7	25	32	70	—	—	—	—	—
2005–06	Tampa Bay Lightning	NHL	5	0	0	0	2	—	—	—	—	—
2006–07	Springfield Falcons	AHL	53	6	13	19	34	—	—	—	—	—
2006–07	Portland Pirates	AHL	13	0	2	2	17	—	—	—	—	—
2007–08	Lukko	SM-l	39	5	4	9	51	—	—	—	—	—
2008–09	Rochester Americans	AHL	12	0	2	2	8	—	—	—	—	—
2008–09	Florida Everblades	ECHL	56	7	18	25	130	9	2	6	8	12
2009–10	HC Plzeň 1929	ELH	44	1	2	3	94	4	0	0	0	6
2010–11	HC Sparta Praha	ELH	50	2	10	12	75	—	—	—	—	—
2011–12	Corner Brook Royals	NLSHL	23	7	15	22	94	4	1	0	1	2
2012–13	Eastlink Cee Bee Stars	NLSHL	7	2	3	5	28	8	3	4	7	29
2013–14	Eastlink Cee Bee Stars	NLSHL	15	4	3	7	89	—	—	—	—	—
2014–15	Clarenville Caribous	NLSHL	15	2	7	9	79	4	0	1	1	20
2016–17	Northeast Sr. Eagles	ECSHL	8	1	3	4	31	—	—	—	—	—
AHL totals			235	17	59	76	207	—	—	—	—	—
NHL totals			5	0	0	0	2	—	—	—	—	—

== Awards ==
QMJHL

Award	Year(s)
QMJHL First All-Star Team	2004
Emile Bouchard Trophy (Best Defenceman)	2004

CHL

Award	Year(s)
Memorial Cup All-Star Team	2003, 2004
Ed Chynoweth Trophy (Memorial Cup Leading Scorer)	2004
