= 1999 Memorial Cup =

Canadian junior men's ice hockey championship

1999 Mastercard Memorial Cup

Tournament details
- Venue(s): Ottawa Civic Centre; Ottawa, Ontario
- Dates: May 15–23, 1999
- Teams: 4
- Host team: Ottawa 67's (OHL)
- TV partner(s): CTV, CTV Sportsnet

Final positions
- Champions: Ottawa 67's (OHL) (2nd title)

Tournament statistics
- Games played: 8
- Attendance: 84,200 (10,525 per game)

The Memorial Cup trophy

The 1999 Memorial Cup took place from May 15–23 at the Ottawa Civic Centre in Ottawa, Ontario, Canada. It was the 81st annual Memorial Cup competition and determined the major junior ice hockey champion of the Canadian Hockey League (CHL). Participating teams were the host Ottawa 67's, the Belleville Bulls, winners of the Ontario Hockey League, the Acadie-Bathurst Titan, winners of the Quebec Major Junior Hockey League and the Calgary Hitmen, Western Hockey League champions. The host 67's won their second Memorial Cup, the first being in 1984. The 67's, who had lost in the second round of the OHL playoffs to the Bulls were able to win the Cup defeated those same Bulls in a Cup semi-final. The 67's then defeated the Hitmen in the final, an overtime thriller where Matt Zultek scored the winning goal.

The 1999 Memorial Cup set a record for attendance (since the round-robin format was first used in 1972) with a total of 84,200 people in eight sell-out games. It was the first Memorial Cup to be shown on CTV Sportsnet, having moved from TSN. The championship game was shown on the CTV network, where it had last been shown in 1989.

== Background ==
At the beginning of the 1998–1999 season, Ottawa's new owner, Jeff Hunt vowed to bring home the Memorial Cup that season. The awarding of the Cup tournament to Ottawa was a big factor in the team more than doubling the attendance from the previous season. That was definitely taken into consideration when Ottawa was chosen as the host of the 1999 Cup, as every game would be sold out in the 10,525 seat Ottawa Civic Centre. Ottawa had previously bid for the 1996 Memorial Cup but lost the bid to the Peterborough Petes.

== CHL All-time team ==
During the 1999 Memorial Cup, the CHL unveiled its "All-time team" at the Civic Centre, with notably two 67's on the team. Special banners were raised in their honour, and except for Parent and Lemieux, the team attended the event. The team was as follows;

- Goal: Bernie Parent, Niagara Falls Flyers (1963–1965)
- Defence: Bobby Orr, Oshawa Generals (1963–1966)
- Defence: Denis Potvin, Ottawa 67's (1967–1973)
- Centre: Mario Lemieux, Laval Voisins (1981–1984)
- Right wing: Guy Lafleur, Quebec Remparts (1969–1971)
- Left wing: Brian Propp, Brandon Wheat Kings (1976–1979)
- Coach: Brian Kilrea, Ottawa 67's (1974–1984; 1986–1994; 1995–2009)

== Rosters ==
Acadie-Bathurst Titan (QMJHL)	Belleville Bulls (OHL)
Goaltenders: 1 – Roberto Luongo; 30 – Philippe Ozga; 33 – Frédéric Cloutier; Defencemen: 5 – Hugo Levesque; 8 – Jerome Dumont; 9 – Alain O'Driscoll; 16 – Jean-Sébastien Trudelle; 18 – Denis Boudreau; 24 – François Beauchemin; 63 – Jonathan Girard; 71 – Philippe Plante; 74 – Danny Groulx; Forwards: 4 – Martin Lavergne; 7 – Brian Dubé; 10 – Jules-Edy Laraque; 14 – Martin Fillion; 15 – Éric Betournay; 25 – Alain Charbonneau; 28 – Benoît Beausoleil; 44 – Ramzi Abid; 55 – Marc Bouchard; 79 – Gregor Baumgartner; 88 – Ryan Flinn; 97 – Mathieu Benoît; Head coach: Roger Dejoie	Goaltenders: 1 – Cory Campbell; 30 – Chad Mehlenbacher; Defencemen: 2 – Nick Policelli; 4 – Jason Lawmaster; 5 – Mike Jacobsen; 6 – Joe Groleau; 14 – Kelly Paddon; 24 – Branislav Mezei; 25 – Rick Bertran; 44 – Adam Collins; Forwards: 3 – Justin Grady; 7 – Kris Newbury; 8 – Tyler Longo; 9 – Mike Renzi; 10 – Mark Chaplin; 11 – Ryan Ready; 13 – Chris Stanley; 16 – Glenn Crawford; 17 – Justin Papineau; 18 – Randy Rowe; 19 – Jonathan Cheechoo; 22 – Branko Radivojevic; 23 – Kevin Baker; 37 – Derek Campbell; 77 – Nathan Robinson; Head coach: Lou Crawford
Calgary Hitmen (WHL)	Ottawa 67's (host)
Goaltenders: 1 – Brent Williams; 27 – Alexandre Fomitchev; Defencemen: 2 – Matt Kinch; 4 – Jeff Feniak; 5 – Kenton Smith; 6 – Rod Sarich; 7 – Brad Stuart; 19 – Wade Davis; 22 – Curtis Rich; Forwards: 3 – Ryan Shannon; 8 – Pavel Brendl; 10 – Chris Nielsen; 11 – Sean McAslan; 12 – Jordan Krestanovich; 14 – Michael Bubnick; 15 – Kris Beech; 18 – Shaun Norrie; 20 – Brad Moran; 21 – Lyle Steenbergen; 23 – Ryan Andres; 24 – Brent Dodginghorse; 25 – Jerred Smithson; 26 – Peter Bergman; 33 – Eric Clark; Head coach: Dean Clark	Goaltenders: 1 – Seamus Kotyk; 30 – Levente Szuper; Defencemen: 2 – Jeremy Van Hoof; 4 – Jon Zion; 5 – Jeff MacLean; 6 – Chris Cava; 10 – Nick Boynton; 22 – Luke Sellars; 44 – Brian Campbell; Forwards: 3 – Dan Tessier; 9 – Matt Zultek; 11 – Henric Alfredsson; 12 – Justin Davis; 16 – Mark Bell; 17 – Dan Tudin; 18 – Dallas Ashford; 19 – Ben Gustavson; 20 – Zenon Konopka; 23 – Miguel Delisle; 24 – Ian Jacobs; 25 – Joe Talbot; 71 – Lance Galbraith; Head coach: Brian Kilrea

== Round-robin standings ==
Pos	Team	Pld	W	L	GF	GA
1	Calgary Hitmen (WHL)	3	2	1	11	7
1	Ottawa 67's (host)	3	2	1	13	9
1	Belleville Bulls (OHL)	3	2	1	11	10
4	Acadie-Bathurst Titan (QMJHL)	3	0	3	3	12

== Scores ==
May 15, 1999	Ottawa	5–1	Acadie-Bathurst	Ottawa Civic Centre

J. Talbot 2:07 (SH); J. Davis 8:06 (PP); I. Jacobs 31:22 (ES); D. Tessier 49:52 (ES); B. Campbell 59:03 (ES) / Goals / R. Abid 24:57 (PP)

May 16, 1999	Calgary	5–2	Belleville	Ottawa Civic Centre

B. Dodginghorse 4:48 (PP); R. Shannon 5:14 (ES); B. Moran 23:58 (ES); B. Moran 53:45 (ES); J. Smithson 59:52 (SH) / Goals / J. Cheechoo 31:57 (SH); M. Jacobsen 46:44 (ES)

May 17, 1999	Ottawa	4–3	Calgary	Ottawa Civic Centre

L. Galbraith 22:33 (ES); J. Talbot 36:31 (ES); N. Boynton 43:21 (PP); D. Tessier 55:16 (ES) / Goals / K. Beech 25:29 (PP); P. Brendl 28:37 (PP); K. Beech 47:37 (SH)

May 18, 1999	Belleville	4–1	Acadie-Bathurst	Ottawa Civic Centre

J. Cheechoo 0:37 (PP); G. Crawford 16:53 (ES); J. Papineau 21:11 (SH); R. Ready 58:17 (ES) / Goals / M. Fillion 10:20 (PP)

May 19, 1999	Calgary	3–1	Acadie-Bathurst	Ottawa Civic Centre

P. Brendl 19:23 (PP); P. Brendl 43:07 (ES); B. Moran 59:13 (EN) / Goals / A. Charbonneau 8:14 (ES)

May 20, 1999	Belleville	5–4; 2OT	Ottawa	Ottawa Civic Centre

R. Ready 21:35 (PP); K. Paddon 35:55 (PP); D. Campbell 38:57 (ES); D. Campbell 56:03 (ES); G. Crawford 83:16 (ES) / Goals / J. Davis 6:54 (ES); L. Sellars 11:01 (ES); I. Jacobs 11:31 (ES); M. Zultek 14:26 (ES)

Semi-final

May 22, 1999	Ottawa	4–2	Belleville	Ottawa Civic Centre

I. Jacobs 2:46 (ES); J. Talbot 8:56 (SH); M. Delisle 18:09 (ES); J. Davis 39:41 (ES) / Goals / G. Crawford 10:04 (ES); M. Renzi 10:20 (ES)

Final

May 23, 1999	Ottawa	7–6; OT	Calgary	Ottawa Civic Centre

M. Bell 10:30 (ES); B. Gustavson 14:00 (ES); B. Gustavson 20:34 (ES); L. Galbraith 22:30 (ES); M. Bell 45:34 (ES); M. Zultek 47:38 (ES); M. Zultek 61:58 (ES) / Goals / C. Nielsen 15:16 (ES); E. Clark 22:52 (ES); C. Nielsen 27:52 (ES); P. Brendl 40:28 (ES); K. Smith 44:38 (ES); J. Smithson 51:17 (ES)

== Scoring leaders ==
1. Justin Davis, OTT (3g, 6a, 9pts)
2. Mark Bell, OTT (2g, 6a, 8pts)
3. Pavel Brendl, CAL (4g, 3a, 7pts)
4. Joe Talbot, OTT (3g, 4a, 7pts)
5. Nick Boynton, OTT (1g, 6a, 7pts)
6. Brad Moran, CAL (3g, 3a, 6pts)
7. Matt Kinch, CAL (0g, 6a, 6pts)
8. Matt Zultek, OTT (3g, 2a, 5pts)
9. Glenn Crawford, BEL (3g, 1a, 4pts)
10. Ian Jacobs, OTT (3g, 1a, 4pts)

== Goaltending leaders ==
1. Seamus Kotyk, OTT (2.83 gaa, 0.907 sv%)
2. Cory Campbell, BEL (2.97 gaa, 0.911 sv%)
3. Alexandre Fomitchev, CAL (3.49, 0.894 sv%)
4. Roberto Luongo, ACA (3.67, 0.893 sv%)

== Award winners ==
- Stafford Smythe Memorial Trophy (MVP): Nick Boynton, Ottawa
- George Parsons Trophy (Sportsmanship): Brian Campbell, Ottawa
- Hap Emms Memorial Trophy (Goaltender): Cory Campbell, Belleville
- Ed Chynoweth Trophy (Top Scorer): Justin Davis, Ottawa

All-star team

- Goal: Cory Campbell, Belleville
- Defence: Matt Kinch, Calgary; Nick Boynton, Ottawa
- Forward: Glenn Crawford, Belleville; Joe Talbot, Ottawa; Pavel Brendl, Calgary
