= 1982 Memorial Cup =

Canadian junior men's ice hockey championship

Tournament details
- Venue(s): Robert Guertin Arena; Hull, Quebec
- Dates: May 8–15, 1982
- Teams: 3

Final positions
- Champions: Kitchener Rangers (OHL) (1st title)

Tournament statistics
- Games played: 7

The Memorial Cup trophy

The 1982 Memorial Cup was held May 8–15, 1982, at the Robert Guertin Arena in Hull, Quebec. It was the 64th annual Memorial Cup competition and determined the major junior ice hockey champion of the Canadian Hockey League (CHL). The champions of the Ontario Hockey League (OHL), Quebec Major Junior Hockey League (QMJHL) and Western Hockey League (WHL) – the Kitchener Rangers, Sherbrooke Castors and Portland Winter Hawks respectively – competed for the championship in a double round-robin tournament. The Winter Hawks became the first American-based team to compete for the trophy, while the Rangers defeated the Castors in the final to capture their first Memorial Cup championship. Sherbrooke's Sean McKenna was named tournament most valuable player.

== Teams ==
QMJHL Team OHL Team WHL Team Host City

=== Kitchener Rangers ===
The Kitchener Rangers represented the Ontario Hockey League at the 1982 Memorial Cup. This tournament was the second consecutive trip to the Memorial Cup by the Rangers. During the 1981-82 season, Kitchener was the top ranked team in the Emms Division with a 44-21-3 record, earning 91 points, and finishing second overall in the league. The Rangers scored 322 goals, ranking the club fourth in goals scored. Kitchener was the second best defensive club, allowing 243 goals. In the Emms Division semi-finals, the Rangers swept the Windsor Spitfires in four games to advance to the next round of the post-season. In the Emms Division finals, Kitchener defeated the Sault Ste. Marie Greyhounds four games to one, as well as one game ending in a tie, advancing to the OHL finals. The Rangers captured the J. Ross Robertson Cup as they defeated the top ranked team in the OHL, the Ottawa 67's, four games to zero, and having one game end in a tie. The win over the 67's was the Rangers second straight OHL championship and earned the team a berth into the 1982 Memorial Cup.

The Rangers offense was led by top prospect Brian Bellows, as he scored 45 goals and 97 points in 47 games, leading the Rangers in points. Bellows added 16 goals and 29 points in 15 post-season games. Following the season, Bellows was drafted by the Minnesota North Stars with the second overall selection at the 1982 NHL entry draft. Grant Martin finished second in team scoring, as he scored 33 goals and 96 points in 54 games. Jeff Larmer led Kitchener with 51 goals, and earned 95 points in 49 games. Larmer led the Rangers in post-season scoring, as he had a team high 21 goals and 35 points in 15 games. On defense, Al MacInnis led the way, scoring 25 goals and 75 points in 59 games after starting the season with the Calgary Flames of the National Hockey League. Scott Stevens emerged as a top NHL prospect during the season, as he scored six goals and 42 points in 68 games, while accumulating 158 penalty minutes. Stevens would be drafted by the Washington Capitals with the fifth overall selection at the 1982 NHL entry draft. David Shaw was another top prospect on the club, as in 68 games, he scored six goals and 31 points from the blue line. Shaw would be drafted with the thirteenth overall selection by the Quebec Nordiques at the 1982 NHL entry draft. Wendell Young played the majority of games in goal, earning a 38-17-2 record with a 3.37 GAA in 60 games.

The 1982 Memorial Cup was the second appearance by the Rangers in team history. At the 1981 Memorial Cup, Kitchener lost in the final game by a score of 8-2 to the Cornwall Royals.

=== Portland Winter Hawks ===
The Portland Winter Hawks represented the Western Hockey League at the 1982 Memorial Cup. The Winter Hawks became the first non-Canadian based team to qualify for the tournament. During the 1981-82 season, Portland had the best record in the West Division with a 46-24-2 record, earning 94 points. The Winter Hawks ranked fifth in league scoring with 380 goals scored. Portland was also the fifth ranked defensive team in the WHL during the regular season, allowing 323 goals. In the West Division semi-finals, the Winter Hawks swept the Kamloops Junior Oilers in four games. In the West Division finals, Portland defeated the Seattle Breakers four games to two to advance to the WHL finals. The Winter Hawks defeated the Regina Pats four games to one to capture the President's Cup and earn a berth into the 1982 Memorial Cup.

Ken Yaremchuk led the Winter Hawks offense, scoring 58 goals and 157 points in 72 games, while also accumulating 181 penalty minutes. Yaremchuk ranked fifth in WHL scoring. Following the season, Yaremchuk was drafted by the Chicago Black Hawks with the seventh overall pick at the 1982 NHL entry draft. Brian Shaw scored 56 goals and 132 points in 69 games, as he finished ninth in league scoring. In the post-season, Shaw led the Winter Hawks with 18 goals in 15 games. Rookie Randy Heath scored 52 goals and 99 points in 65 games. In the playoffs, Heath earned a team high 32 points in 15 games. Gary Nylund led Portland's defense, as he scored seven goals and 66 points in 65 games. Nylund also registered 267 penalty minutes. Nylund won the Bill Hunter Trophy as the Top Defenseman in the WHL and would be selected by the Toronto Maple Leafs with the third overall selection at the 1982 NHL entry draft. In goal, Darrell May saw the bulk of action, earning a 31-20-2 record with a 4.38 GAA and a .890 save percentage in 52 games.

The 1982 Memorial Cup was the Winter Hawks first appearance in club history.

=== Sherbrooke Castors ===
The Sherbrooke Castors represented the Quebec Major Junior Hockey League at the 1982 Memorial Cup. The Castors finished at the top of the QMJHL standings during the 1981-82 season with a 42-20-2 record, earning 88 points and winning the Jean Rougeau Trophy as the Top Club in the Regular Season. The high-scoring Castors led the league with 392 goals, while they were the third ranked defensive club as they allowed 265 goals. In the round-robin portion of the post-season, Sherbrooke finished second out of eight teams with a 9-5 record. In the QMJHL semi-finals, the Castors swept the Laval Voisins in four games. In the President's Cup finals, Sherbrooke stayed red hot and swept the Trois-Rivières Draveurs in four games to clinch the QMJHL championship and earn a berth into the 1982 Memorial Cup.

John Chabot led the Castors offense, scoring 39 goals and 143 points in 62 games, ranking third in QMJHL scoring. Chabot was awarded the Michel Brière Memorial Trophy as the Most Valuable Player in the QMJHL. Daniel Campeau broke the 100-point plateau, scoring 58 goals and 108 points in 64 games. Gerald Gallant finished third in team scoring with 34 goals and 92 points, while accumulating 260 penalty minutes in 58 games. Sean McKenna scored 57 goals and 90 points in 59 games, while in the post-season, McKenna scored a team high 26 goals and 44 points in 22 games. Defenseman Paul Boutilier led the Castors blue line with 20 goals and 80 points in 57 games after beginning the season with the New York Islanders. Boutilier was awarded the Emile Bouchard Trophy as the Top Defenseman in the QMJHL. Rookie Michel Petit scored 10 goals and 49 points in 63 games, as he was named the winner of the Mike Bossy Trophy as the top prospect in the QMJHL, and Petit was awarded the Raymond Lagacé Trophy as the Defensive Rookie of the Year in the QMJHL. Following the season, Petit was selected eleventh overall by the Vancouver Canucks at the 1982 NHL entry draft. Goaltender Michel Morissette earned a 30-11-1 record with a 3.51 GAA and a .895 save percentage with the Castors following an early season trade with the Laval Voisins. In the post-season, Morissette earned a 16-4 record with a 3.42 GAA and a .898 save percentage to capture the Guy Lafleur Trophy as QMJHL Playoff MVP.

The 1982 Memorial Cup was the Castors third appearance at the tournament. The club finished in third place in their two previous visits to the Memorial Cup in 1975 and 1977.

== Tournament ==
The Kitchener Rangers entered the tournament as J. Ross Robertson Cup champions in the OHL having defeated the Ottawa 67's in the final. The Sherbrooke Castors won the QMJHL's President's Cup by defeating the Trois-Rivières Draveurs. As the Castors had announced their intention to relocate to Saint-Jean-sur-Richelieu the following season, they hoped to leave Sherbrooke as national champions. The Portland Winter Hawks overcame the Regina Pats in the WHL final to win that league's President's Cup. In doing so, they became the first American-based team to compete for Canada's national junior championship. The Winter Hawks entered the tournament as favourite to win the title.

The tournament was held in a double round-robin format, with each squad playing their opponents twice. The Rangers were routed by the Castors 10–4 in the opening game, but rebounded to defeat the Winter Hawks 9–2 in the second. Brian Bellows broke a Memorial Cup record in the second game, scoring the fastest goal to start a game in tournament history at 11 seconds. Portland then defeated Sherbrook 6–5 in overtime to bring all three teams to one win and one loss apiece. The Rangers rebounded from their opening loss to Sherbrooke, defeating the Castors 4–0 the second time around, but lost 4–2 to the Winter Hawks. Sherbrooke closed out the round robin with a 7–3 victory over Portland.

As all three teams tied with 2–2 records, the Rangers and Castors went through to the final via greater goal differential. The championship game was held on May 15 in front of 4,091 fans. The Rangers led the game 3–1 after the first period, and 5–2 after the second. Kitchener's Mike Eagles put the game out of reach by scoring two short handed goals 14-seconds apart early in the third. For the Rangers, it was their first Memorial Cup championship in franchise history. Sherbrooke's Sean McKenna was named tournament most valuable player after scoring 11 points in 5 games. His selection that upset the Rangers who felt that Brian Bellows, who scored five points in the championship game, should have won the award.

=== Round-robin standings ===
Pos	Team	Pld	W	L	GF	GA	
1	Sherbrooke Castors (QMJHL)	4	2	2	22	17	Advanced to the final
2	Kitchener Rangers (OHL)	4	2	2	19	16	Advanced to the final
3	Portland Winter Hawks (WHL)	4	2	2	15	23	

== Scores ==
Round-robin

- May 8 – Sherbrooke 10–4 Kitchener
- May 9 – Kitchener 9–2 Portland
- May 10 – Portland 6–5 Sherbrooke
- May 11 – Kitchener 4–0 Sherbrooke
- May 12 – Portland 4–2 Kitchener
- May 13 – Sherbrooke 7–3 Portland

Final

- May 15 – Kitchener 7–4 Sherbrooke

Boxscore

- KIT – Brian Bellows goal
- SBK – Sean McKenna goal
- KIT – Brian Bellows goal
- KIT – Brian Bellows goal
- KIT – Al MacInnis goal (Brian Bellows assist)
- KIT – Grant Martin goal (Brian Bellows assist – five points)
- SBK – Sean McKenna goal
- KIT – Mike Eagles goal
- KIT – Mike Eagles goal
- SBK – Mike Fafard goal
- SBK – Paul Boutillier goal

== Players ==
Several players from this tournament went on to play in the National Hockey League (NHL). Kitchener defencemen Al MacInnis and Scott Stevens both went on to Hall of Fame careers. Both won the Stanley Cup during their NHL careers, as did Brian Bellows. Wendell Young, Mike Eagles, Mike Hough, John Tucker, David Shaw, Grant Martin, Jeff Larmer, and Mike Moher also moved on from the Rangers to the NHL. From Sherbrooke, Sean McKenna, John Chabot, Paul Boutilier and Gerard Gallant. And from Portland, Gary Nylund, Perry Pelensky and Darrell May.

=== Winning roster ===
1981-82 Kitchener Rangers
Goaltenders: – Darryl Boudreau; – Jim Ralph; – Wendell Young	Defencemen: – Joel Levesque; – Al MacInnis; – Robert Savard; – David Shaw; – Scott Stevens	Wingers: – Brian Bellows - C; – Kevin Casey; – Louis Crawford; – Mike Eagles; – Mike Hough; – Jeff Larmer; – Mario Michieli; – Mike Moher; – Dave Nicholls	Centres: – Grant Martin; – Brad Schnurr; – John Tucker; Coach: Joe Crozier; General Manager: Joe Crozier

== Award winners ==
- Stafford Smythe Memorial Trophy (MVP): Sean McKenna, Sherbrooke
- George Parsons Trophy (Sportsmanship): Brian Bellows, Kitchener
- Hap Emms Memorial Trophy (Goaltender): Michel Morrissette, Sherbrooke

All-star team

- Goal: Michel Morrissette, Sherbrooke
- Defence: Paul Boutilier, Sherbrooke; Gary Nylund, Portland, Al MacInnis, Kitchener
- Centre: John Chabot, Sherbrooke
- Left wing: Jeff Larmer, Kitchener
- Right wing: Sean McKenna, Sherbrooke
