= Kitchener Rangers =

Canadian junior ice hockey team

- City: Kitchener, Ontario
- League: Ontario Hockey League
- Conference: Western
- Division: Midwest
- Founded: 1963–64
- Home arena: Kitchener Memorial; Auditorium Complex
- Colours: Blue, red, white
- General manager: Mike McKenzie
- Head coach: Jeff Kyrzakos
- Captain: Cameron Reid
- Affiliates: Waterloo Siskins (GOJHL); Georgetown Raiders (OJHL)
- Website: www.kitchenerrangers.com

Franchise history
- 1937–1939: Guelph Indians
- 1939–1942 1947–1960: Guelph Biltmores
- 1960–1963: Guelph Royals
- 1963–present: Kitchener Rangers

Championships
- Playoff championships: Memorial Cup: 1982, 2003, 2026; OHL: 1981, 1982, 2003, 2008, 2026

Current uniform

The Kitchener Rangers are a major junior ice hockey team based in Kitchener, Ontario, Canada. They are members of the Midwest Division of the Western Conference of the Ontario Hockey League. The Rangers have won the J. Ross Robertson Cup as OHL champions in 1981, 1982, 2003, 2008, and 2026. They have appeared in seven Memorial Cups (1981, 1982, 1984, 1990, 2003, 2008, and 2026), advancing to the final game of the tournament each of those seven years. They are three-time Memorial Cup champions (1982, 2003, 2026).

The Rangers are publicly owned, with a board of directors. The team has more than 180 players and coaches going on to serve in the NHL including Gabriel Landeskog, Jeff Skinner, Radek Faksa, John Gibson, Nazem Kadri, Mike Richards, David Clarkson, Steve Mason, Derek Roy and Peter DeBoer. Five of their alumni have gone on to be inducted into the Hockey Hall of Fame: Scott Stevens, Bill Barber, Paul Coffey, Larry Robinson and Al MacInnis.

== History ==
The Kitchener Rangers franchise was inaugurated ahead of the 1947–48 Ontario Hockey Association season as the Guelph Biltmores. Based in nearby Guelph, Ontario, the Biltmores were a farm team for the National Hockey League's New York Rangers. The team enjoyed considerable success in the 1950s, winning three league championships and a Memorial Cup. However, by 1960, the team was struggling financially and was sold to new ownership. The new owners re-branded the team as the Guelph Royals to match Guelph's nickname, the "Royal City". Despite these efforts to reignite the fading brand, the team's financial struggles persisted. At the end of the 1962–63 season, Kitchener entrepreneur Eugene George was approached by the New York Rangers about moving the team to Kitchener in hopes of building a more stable junior environment.

In 1963, George and a group of Kitchener businessmen relocated the Guelph Royals to Kitchener and renamed them the Kitchener Rangers Junior "A" Hockey Club. The New York Rangers sponsorship of the team ended in 1967 with the expansion of the NHL's "Original Six’" Era, so George agreed to purchase the team from the New York Rangers for a sum of one dollar, but declined the opportunity for private ownership. He instead turned the team over to the community through the creation of a not-for-profit organization. The Kitchener Rangers Charter declared "no person shall be a member of the Corporation unless he is a season ticket subscriber for the current season of the home hockey games of the club, and all persons who are season ticket subscribers are automatically entitled to membership."

=== 1960s ===
For their debut season in 1963–64, the team moved into the Kitchener Memorial Auditorium, which had previously been home to the Kitchener Greenshirts and the Kitchener Canucks. On Tuesday, October 1, 1963, the Rangers' first coach, Steve Brklacich, welcomed a 54-player roster of training camp hopefuls just two weeks prior to the home opener. The first exhibition game took place on Sunday, October 6, 1963, against the Peterborough Petes. The team's first regular season game featured the Rangers and the visiting St. Catharines Black Hawks on Tuesday, October 15, 1963, which dressed the likes of league All-Stars Dennis Hull and Doug Jarrett. The first goal in team history was scored by John Beechey, assisted by Gary Sabourin and Tommy Miller, at 11:36 of the first period. The team's first captain, Alexander 'Sandy' Fitzpatrick, would score the first game-winning goal in team history, breaking open a 3–3 tie in the third period to propel the Blueshirts to a 4–3 win. The Rangers were successful promoting the team in the community, drawing high attendance despite a poor first season in the standings which finished with a record of 9-41-6 (W-L-T).

The Rangers struggled during their first three seasons in the OHA, finishing under .500 in the following two campaigns (6th in 1964–65, 7th in 1965–66). Despite the seventh-place finish in 1965–66, the team finished the year strong and won the first two rounds of playoffs to make it to the OHA Finals, eventually falling 4–1 in a best-of-seven series to the Oshawa Generals and a young Bobby Orr. Kitchener finished in first place the next season (1966–67, 38–10–6), earning their first Hamilton Spectator Trophy in franchise history as regular season champions, but fell to the Toronto Marlboros in the semi-finals. In 1967–68, the Rangers were first again in the OHA and went on to win their second consecutive Hamilton Spectator Trophy. They played in the Finals again, but this time losing a close series 4 games to 3 with a tie, to the eventual Memorial Cup champion Niagara Falls Flyers. In 1968–69, Jim Malleck succeeded Eugene George as the team's president. In November 1968, Kitchener native Dave Weber was appointed coach after Wally Kullman was relieved of his duties. But the Rangers posted just nine wins (9–40–5), finishing in 10th place after seeing 13 players from the previous season graduate to the professional ranks. In 1969, Walter (Punch) Scherer, a former scout for the Boston Bruins, became the team's general manager. The decade finished on a high note, however, as rookie Bill Barber dressed in his first of three junior seasons in Kitchener and tallied 37 goals and 86 points in just 54 regular season games.

1969 also marked the year that Les Bradley joined the team. Bradley was a mainstay on the bench as the team's trainer from 1969 to 1986, then after retiring as a trainer became an ambassador in the press room for more than 15 years.

=== 1970s ===
Gerry Forler became the Rangers' coach for the 1970–71 season but resigned in December, 1970 and was replaced by Ron Murphy for the remainder of the season. Kitchener struggled through most of the decade, posting only two winning seasons (a 31-24-8 record in 1971–72, and 43-18-9 in 1973–74). Barber posted his first of two straight 100+ point seasons in 1970–71, scoring 46 goals and 105 points in 61 regular season games. He was one of two players to hit the 100-point milestone (Tom Cassidy, 104 points) that year, but the Rangers were unable to get out of the first round of the playoffs. In 1973–74, the Rangers finished first in the OHA for their third Hamilton Spectator Trophy in eight years in large part due to the goalkeeping of Don Edwards, who had the league's lowest goals against average. The team lost to the Peterborough Petes in the second round of the playoffs.

In the 1974–75 season, the club finished last in the league and 20 points out of a playoff spot with a record of 17–47–6. Despite their last-place finish, the Rangers would host the Memorial Cup that season as no host team was in place. For the following season in 1975–76, there were changes at president, general manager and coach. The team improved by 17 points, rising to a fourth-place finish in the standings. In 1976–77, Foster would set the Rangers franchise record for points in a single season (143), a mark that still stands today. His total 382 points in 262 regular season games over 1973-77 also remains a club record.

The Rangers' record during the 1979–80 season dropped to 17–51–0, but Paul Coffey, a young acquired defenceman from the Sault Ste. Marie Greyhounds, collected 71 points in 52 regular season games before being drafted sixth overall by the Edmonton Oilers in the 1980 NHL entry draft.

=== 1980s ===
==== 1981 Memorial Cup ====
The Rangers were looking to rebound from a 17-51-0 season in 1979–80, but the first half of the 1980-81 campaign left them in last place by Christmas. But a strong second half - culminating with eight wins in nine games to finish the season - propelled the Rangers to a first-place finish and an Emms Division title. They would see a 35-point improvement from the previous season, finishing with a mark of 34–33–1. Coached by Orval Tessier, the Rangers were led offensively by 49 goals and 116 points from right winger Brian Bellows, along with 54 goals and 108 points from left winger Jeff Larmer. Centreman Grant Martin was just two points shy of joining them in the century club, notching 41 goals and 98 points. Other standouts on the squad included Al MacInnis, Mike Eagles, Larry Carroll and goalie Wendell Young.

Kitchener's playoffs began against the Niagara Falls Flyers, and they defeated them with a 4–2 series win, including one tie. The Rangers scored five or more goals in every game of the series, with the exception of the 3–3 tie in Game 4. Next up was a meeting with the Windsor Spitfires in Round 3, which the Rangers won 4–0 with one tie. Again the Blueshirts offense proved formidable, scoring no fewer than four goals in each contest and twice scoring seven. This set the stage for an OHL Final vs. the Sault Ste. Marie Greyhounds. The Hounds were favoured to win the league title, having averaged the highest goals per game average in the league and finishing 27 points ahead of Kitchener in the regular season standings. The Rangers, however, held the Greyhounds to 16 goals in the series six games and were undefeated in the league final. They skated to a 3–0 series win with three ties to earn their first J. Ross Robertson Cup as OHL champions in franchise history.

The 1981 Memorial Cup was played at the Windsor Arena in Windsor, Ontario. Kitchener represented the Ontario Hockey League while centre Barry Pederson (65 goals, 147 points in 55 regular season games), right winger Rich Chernomaz (49 goals, 113 points in 72 games) and goaltender Grant Fuhr were key pieces of the Western Hockey League's Victoria Cougars. The Quebec Major Junior Hockey League squad - and defending Memorial Cup Champions - were the Cornwall Royals which featured the likes of centre Dale Hawerchuk (81 goals, 183 points in 72 games), left winger Marc Crawford (42 goals, 99 points in 63 games) and centre Doug Gilmour (35 points in 51 games).

Kitchener lost its first two games; 6–3 to Cornwall and 7–4 to Victoria. The Rangers then posted consecutive victories; 6–4 over the Royals in which Bellows scored a hat trick, and 4-2 vs. the Cougars. The Rangers went on to face Cornwall in the tournament final but dropped a 5-2 decision to the Royals, who would win their second consecutive Memorial Cup.

==== 1982 Memorial Cup ====
Joe Crozier took over the coaching duties after the 1980–81 season after coach/general manager Orval Tessier left the team to become head coach of the American Hockey League's New Brunswick Hawks, who he would lead to a Calder Cup championship. Kitchener picked up where it left off from the previous season, finding success while being led by top players Larry Carroll, Brian Bellows and Jeff Larmer, as well as added future NHL players Scott Stevens and Mike Hough. The Rangers won the Emms Division for the second year in a row with a much improved record (44–21–3).

Kitchener earned a first round bye in the playoffs, then skated to a 4–0 series win over the Windsor Spitfires in Round 2. They once again clashed with the Sault Ste. Marie Greyhounds, this time in Round 3, and again earned a series win this time in five games (4–1). The Rangers faced off against the Ottawa 67's, coached by Brian Kilrea, in the league final and claimed their second straight J. Ross Robertson Cup with a 4–0 series victory, including one tie.

The 1982 Memorial Cup was played at Robert Guertin Arena in Hull, Quebec. Kitchener represented the Ontario Hockey League, while left winger Gerard Gallant (34 goals, 92 points in 58 regular season games) and centre John Chabot (34 goals, 143 points in 62 games) were members of the QMJHL's Sherbrooke Castors. Centre Ken Yaremchuk (58 goals, 157 points in 72 games) and right winger Brian Shaw (56 goals, 132 points in 69 games) were members of the Western Hockey League champion Portland Winter Hawks.

Kitchener lost 10–4 to Sherbrooke in their opener before rebounding with a 9–2 win over Portland in game two. Brian Bellows scored 11 seconds into the game against Portland, setting a Memorial Cup record. In their third game, the Rangers shut out the Castors 4–0. The game was very physical, and included a bench-clearing brawl in the second period. Kitchener seemed to be a bit worn out the next night, losing 4–2 to Portland.

The Rangers and the Castors made it to the finals on a better goals for and against total, after all three teams won and lost two games each in the round-robin. The final game drew 4,091 spectators who saw Bellows score a hat trick and add two assists, propelling the Rangers to a 7–4 victory and their first Memorial Cup championship.

In 1982–83, the Rangers finished with a 45-23-2 record and a second-place finish in the Emms Division. After a first round bye they faced the North Bay Centennials in Round 2 and won the series, 4–1. They would meet the Sault Ste. Marie Greyhounds for the third consecutive year in the playoffs but this time the Hounds won the series, 4–2 with one tie, eliminating the Blueshirts from post-season play.

==== 1984 Memorial Cup ====
Even before the season began the Rangers knew they would be returning to the Memorial Cup for the third time in four seasons, as they were awarded the right to host the event in 1984. Tom Barrett took over coaching duties prior to the campaign, which saw Kitchener post the best record in the OHL (52–16–2) with 106 points. The Rangers were led offensively by right winger Wayne Presley (63 goals, 139 points in 70 regular season games) and centre John Tucker (40 goals, 100 points in 39 games). Tucker would go on to be named the OHL's Most Outstanding Player, while Presley was the top scoring right winger. Shawn Burr (41 goals, 85 points in 68 games) was the league's Rookie of the Year.

At the end of the regular season, Kitchener earned its third straight first round bye before sweeping the London Knights, 4–0, in the second round. The Rangers avenged the previous season's loss to Sault Ste. Marie by winning that series, 4–3. Kitchener then faced the Ottawa 67's in a rematch of the 1982 OHL Finals, but this time the 67's won the series, 3–0, with two ties.

Kitchener represented the host team in the tournament, while the 67's - including right winger Don McLaren (53 goals, 113 points in 70 games), left winger Gary Roberts (27 goals, 57 points in 48 games) and goaltender Darren Pang - represented the Ontario Hockey League as champions. The Western Hockey League was represented by centre Dean Evason (49 goals, 137 points in 57 games), defenceman Doug Bodger (21 goals, 98 points in 70 games) and the Kamloops Junior Oilers, while the Quebec Major Junior Hockey League champion Laval Voisins featured a 17-year-old Mario Lemieux who tallied 133 goals and 282 points in 70 regular-season games that year.

Kitchener defeated Laval 8–2 in game one, holding Lemieux scoreless. In game two, Kitchener had an 8–0 lead over Kamloops but narrowly held on to win the game 9–7. Ottawa had also won its first two games. The Rangers faced the 67's in the final game of round-robin play, posting a 7–2 victory to earn a berth in the finals. Ottawa won their semi-final, 7–2, for the right to play Kitchener for the championship where they would also hand the Rangers a 7–2 defeat to win the Memorial Cup.

Following the 1984 Memorial Cup, the Rangers would finish sixth (1984–85), third (1985–86), fourth (1986–87) and sixth (1987–88) in their division before reclaiming top spot in the Emms with a 41-19-6 record in 1988–89. Goaltender Gus Morschauser was named the OHL Goaltender of the Year, but the Rangers were upset in the first round of the playoffs by the North Bay Centennials.

=== 1990s ===
==== 1990 Memorial Cup ====
In 1989–90, the Rangers finished second overall in the Emms Division (38–21–7) but used their experience to prevail through the playoffs. Kitchener earned a 4–1 series win over the North Bay Centennials before earning a second-round bye. They defeated the Niagara Falls Thunder in the third round, 4–1, setting up a final vs. an Oshawa Generals team which featured Eric Lindros (17 goals, 36 points in 25 games). The Rangers took a 3–1 series lead before the Generals won three straight games en route to the J. Ross Robertson Cup as OHL champions.

The 1990 Memorial Cup was played at Copps Coliseum in Hamilton, Ontario. The Dukes of Hamilton were slated to host the tournament, but due to af poor start to their season they finished last place in the league (11–49–6). They were removed from participation, and the Rangers, as league finalists, took their place.

The other two opponents Kitchener would face in the Memorial Cup were the same opponents they faced the last time they played in the tournament; the QMJHL's Laval Titan (formerly Voisins) and the WHL's Kamloops Blazers (formerly Junior Oilers). Kitchener won their opener vs. Kamloops, 8–7 in overtime. They followed that up with a 5–3 win over Laval. Similar to 1984, both Ontario-based team were undefeated after two games and faced each other in the last game of the round-robin. The game was played in front of 11,134 fans, lasting 4 hours 15 minutes into double overtime, with Oshawa winning 5–4. Kitchener then played Laval in the semi-finals, claiming a 5–4 victory.

The Rangers played the Generals in the tournament final with 17,383 fans in attendance. Much like the first game between the two teams, the championship went into double overtime with the Generals emerging as victors, 4–3.

Following the 1990 Memorial Cup run, the remainder of the decade was lackluster for Kitchener. The team managed three winning seasons (32-30-4 in 1992–93, and 35-28-3 in 1995–96) with their best season coming in 1996–97 with a Central Division title and a record of 34–22–10.

The Rangers earned a first-round bye during the playoffs that year, and claimed a 7–3 win over the Sarnia Sting in Game 7 of Round 2. They fell behind, 3–1, in their third round series vs. the Oshawa Generals before winning Game 5, 5–4. But after games in three straight days and five games in their last six, the two teams had a three-day break before resuming their series. After the break, the Raiders lost 6–1 in Game 6, dropping the series, 4–2.

The final two campaigns of the decade would see the team finish beneath .500, where they would remain until the early 2000s.

=== 2000s ===
After missing the playoffs for the second time in three years (1998–99 and 2000–01), the team fired general manager Jamie McDonald, who earlier released Jess Snyder of his duties as head coach. Prior to the start of the 2001–02 season, Peter DeBoer was named the team's new head coach. He would lead them to a 35-22-10-1 record and a third-place finish in the Midwest Division, culminating in a first round playoff matchup with division rival, the Guelph Storm. The Storm would sweep the season series, 4–0.

In 2002–03, the Rangers brought in Steve Spott, a former assistant to Peter DeBoer in their days with the Plymouth Whalers, into the fold. The team, which featured the likes of Mike Richards, Derek Roy, Gregory Campbell and David Clarkson, began the season three losses and a tie in their first four games. After reaching mid-October with a record of 3-3-2-1 the team's record improved, winning eight in a row (11-3-2-1). During November and December they lost just five games, and sported a 26-8-3-1 record as the calendar year changed to 2003. It was not until January 12 when they lost their tenth game of the season, and they rebounded with their 30th win of the campaign the following game on January 17. They only lost back-to-back games once from January on; the final two games of the regular season.

The Rangers finished the season with a record of 46-14-5-3 (W-L-T-OTL), winning the Midwest Division; those 46 wins setting a new franchise best. Their division title set up a first-round playoff matchup with the Sault Ste. Marie Greyhounds, who the Rangers beat in four straight games. The Greyhounds managed just three goals in the series, being shut out twice by goaltender Scott Dickie in Games 1 and 2. The Rangers faced the Guelph Storm in Round 2, dropping their Highway 7 rivals in five games. Round 3 saw them face the Plymouth Whalers. After skating to a 2–2 series tie through the first four games, the Whalers claimed a 2–1 overtime win at The Aud to take a 3–2 lead. The Rangers earned a 7–4 win in Game 6 to stay alive, then skated to a berth in the OHL Final with a 3–1 win in Game 7.

In the OHL finals, they would take on the eastern conference champion Ottawa 67's. The 67's picked up a 3–2 overtime win in Game 1, but from thereon out it was all Kitchener as the Rangers won the next four games to be crowned J. Ross Robertson Cup champions for the third time in their history. Of the five-game series, three games went to overtime including the series clinching game which was decided in double OT. Derek Roy was named the MVP of the playoffs.

==== 2003 Memorial Cup ====
The 2003 Memorial Cup was played at Colisée Pepsi in Quebec City, Quebec. Kitchener represented the champions of the Ontario Hockey League, while defencemen Josh Georges, Duncan Keith and Shea Weber were members of the Western Hockey League champion Kelowna Rockets. The Hull Olympiques - featuring forwards Max Talbot and Jean-Michel Daoust - were the Quebec Major Junior Hockey League champions while the host Quebec Remparts were led by forwards David Masse and Josh Hennessy.

Kitchener went through the round-robin undefeated, beating the Remparts 4–3 in their opener, the Olympiques, 4–1 in their second game, and the Rockets, 4–2. In the championship final, the Rangers jumped out to a 1–0 lead on a goal by Andre Benoit just 1:45 into the game, and were up 2–0 after a Gregory Campbell power play goal at 3:32. Evan McGrath's first of two second period goals made it 3-0 Kitchener, as the Rangers and Olympiques each tallied three goals a piece in the middle frame. With the Rangers holding a 5–3 lead through 40 minutes of play, David Clarkson added another with 2:38 to play to secure the club's second Memorial Cup title, defeating Hull, 6–3.

The following season the Rangers finished with a modest record of 34-26-6-2 as they competed with division rivals, the London Knights and Guelph Storm, who each finished the campaign with more than 100 points. Their first round playoff match-up was against the Plymouth Whalers, but besides eking out a 5–4 win in Game 3, the Rangers were handily defeated in the series, 4–1.

In 2004–05, the Rangers once again finished the regular season third in the Midwest Division (35-20-9-4), but their run in the playoffs was much longer than the prior year's. After defeating the Erie Otters in six games, Kitchener went on to sweep the Owen Sound Attack in Round 2. Their third round match-up was vs. the London Knights, but after skating through a 1–1 series tie after the first two games, the Knights won the next three and eliminated the Rangers in five games.

Despite registering a franchise-best 47 wins the following year in 2005-06 (47–19–1–1) (W–L–OTL–SOL), the Blueshirts and their 96-point campaign was second-best to the London Knights (49 wins, 102 points) in the Midwest Division standings. But after such a successful regular season, in the first round of the playoffs the Owen Sound Attack (who finished 25 points behind Kitchener in the regular season), dropped the Rangers in five games in the opening round.

In 2006–07, the team once again turned out another 47-win season (47–17–1–3, 98 points), but they again finished second in the Midwest Division to the London Knights (50–14–1–3, 104 points). The Rangers barreled out of the first round, sweeping the Sarnia Sting, 4–0, but were halted by the Plymouth Whalers, 4–1, in Round 2.

In May 2007, it was announced that the Rangers would host the 2008 Memorial Cup, giving the team an automatic entry into the tournament. The 2007–08 team finished with a regular season record of 53-11-1-3, which remains a franchise best in wins and points to this day. They were crowned the winners of the Hamilton Spectator Trophy as the team with the most points (110) in the OHL through the regular season.

In the opening round of the playoffs, the Rangers downed the Plymouth Whalers in four straight games, outscoring their opponents, 29–13. In Round 2 it was another sweep for the Blueshirts, this time against the Sarnia Sting. The Rangers surrendered just six goals in those four games, outscoring Sarnia, 18–4. In the third round they met the Sault Ste. Marie Greyhounds, but again skated to victory, this time with a 4–1 series win. The Ontario Hockey League final pitted the Rangers against the eastern conference champion Belleville Bulls. A 3-0 Rangers series lead evaporated into a 3–3 tie, but the Rangers earned their fourth Ontario Hockey League championship with a 4–1 win over the Bulls in the finale.

==== 2008 Memorial Cup ====
The 2008 Memorial Cup was played at the Kitchener Memorial Auditorium in Kitchener, Ontario. Kitchener represented both the champions of the Ontario Hockey League and the host team. As league finalists, the Belleville Bulls (featuring Matt Beleskey; 41 goals, 90 points in 62 regular season games and PK Subban; eight goals, 46 points in 58 games) also earned a berth in the tournament as representatives of the OHL. Jared Spurgeon, Tyler Johnson, Jared Cowen and Dustin Tokarski were members of the Western Hockey League champion Spokane Chiefs. The Gatineau Olympiques - featuring forwards Claude Giroux, Matthew Pistilli and Paul Byron - were the Quebec Major Junior Hockey League champions.

Kitchener won its first game of the tournament, 6–5 in overtime, vs. Gatineau, before dropping a 2-1 decision to Spokane in the second game of the round robin. Their third game was a 4–3 overtime loss to Belleville, which set up a semi-final meeting between the two teams two nights later in which the Rangers won, 9–0. During the Kitchener-Spokane final, though, the Chiefs skated to a 4–1 win and a Memorial Cup championship on the Rangers home ice at The Aud. During the trophy presentation, the Chiefs endured an infamous gaffe which saw the Memorial Cup come apart and break while the team was passing it among themselves during their celebration.

Following the Memorial Cup run of 2007–08, head coach Peter DeBoer was hired as head coach of the NHL's Florida Panthers and assistant Steve Spott was named the new head coach of the club. After seven straight winning seasons, the team took a step back in the 2008-09 campaign after losing many graduating players from their championship squad. They finished under .500 and fifth in the Midwest Division with a 26-37-3-2 record, missing the playoffs for the first time since 2000–01.

It did not take long to turn things around with Spott at the helm, as the team rebounded with a 34-point improvement the following season, finishing with a record of 42-19-4-3. After a 4–2 series win over the Saginaw Spirit and an 8–3, Game 7 win over the favoured London Knights in Round 2, the Rangers were bounced from the playoffs in the third round by the Windsor Spitfires in Game 7 after holding a 3–0 series lead. The Spitfires would go on to win their first of back-to-back Memorial Cups.

==== Ben Fanelli incident ====
On October 30, 2009, 16-year-old rookie defenceman Ben Fanelli was hit from behind by 20-year-old overage forward Michael Liambis of the Erie Otters at a high speed behind the Rangers' net. The hit, which came at the 7:52 mark of the second period, occurred with such force that it caused Fanelli's helmet to fly off before his head struck a glass partition at the Zamboni entrance. He would suffer a fractured skull and orbital bone and was immediately airlifted to Hamilton General Hospital where he was placed in intensive care. Fanelli was released from Hamilton General Hospital a week later on November 6, 2009. Liambas was suspended for the remainder of the season and the playoffs. After an absence of nearly two years, Fanelli returned to the Rangers and later became team captain. He was named the recipient of the Dan Snyder Memorial Trophy as the OHL Humanitarian of the Year, and also named the CHL Humanitarian of the Year.

=== 2010s ===
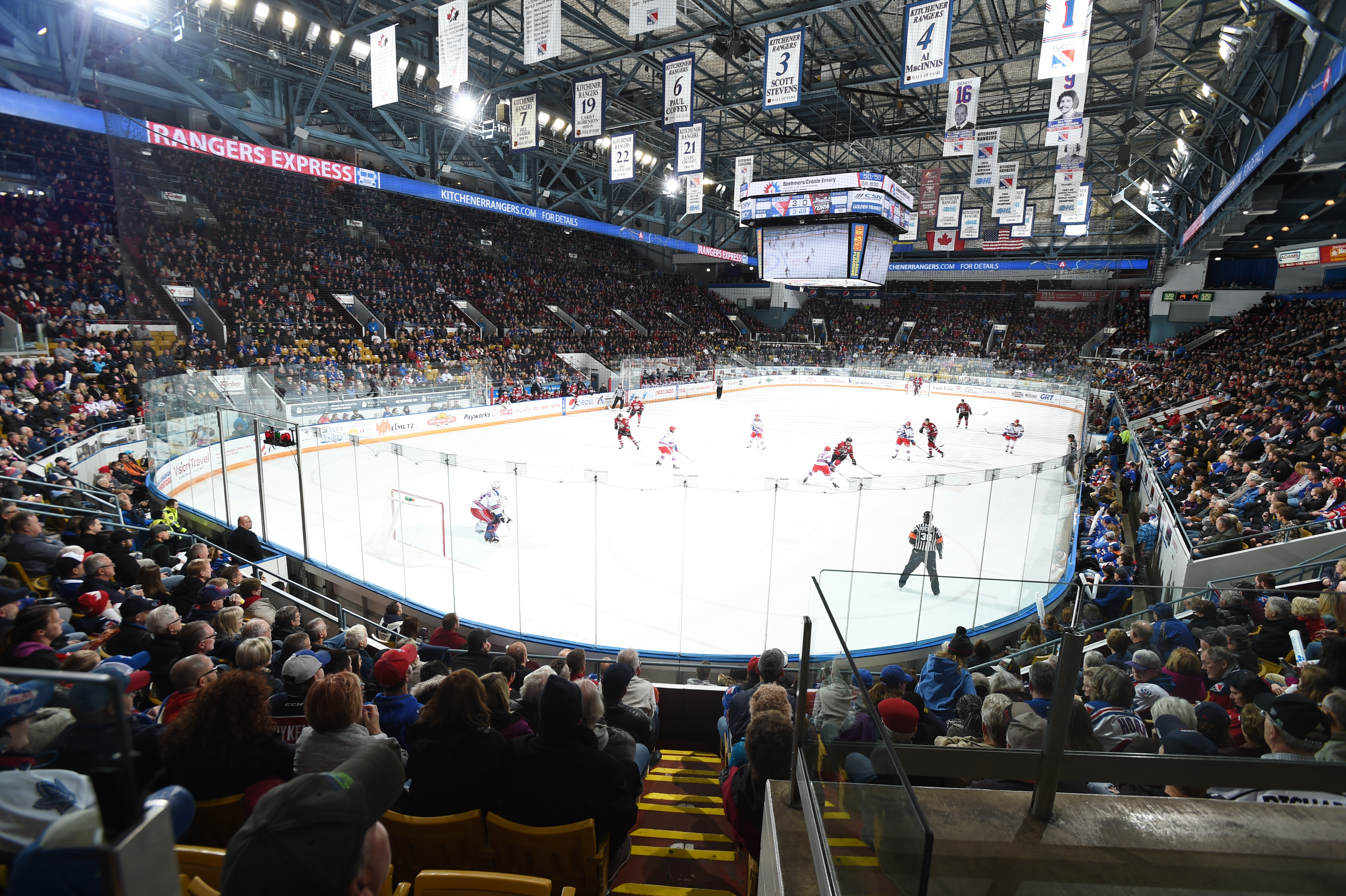
The Kitchener Memorial Auditorium (capacity 7,777) in Kitchener, Ontario, Canada.

The 2009–10 season was highlighted by a 50-goal campaign by Jeff Skinner, followed by a 47-goal effort by Jeremy Morin. The team would finish the regular season third in the western conference with a record of 42-19-4-3 for 91 points. After defeating the Saginaw Spirit in six games in Round 1, and the London Knights in Game 7 of Round 2, the Rangers took a 3–0 series lead over the Windsor Spitfires in the Western Conference Final but surrendered four straight games to the eventual Memorial Cup champion Spits, who never lost another game after Game 3 vs. the Rangers en route to the CHL championship.

The Rangers once again finished third in the conference in 2010–11, and were led by overage Jason Akeson (24G - 84A = 108 points). Down 3–1 in their best-of-seven opening round playoff series vs. the Plymouth Whalers, the Rangers battled back to force a Game 7 but fell short in the deciding game, 4–2. Akeson earned a slew of awards at season's end, including the Eddie Powers Memorial Trophy as the OHL Top Scorer, Jim Mahon Memorial Trophy as the OHL Top Scoring Right Winger, the William Hanley Trophy as OHL Most Sportsmanlike Player, and the Leo Lalonde Memorial Trophy as OHL Top Overage Player.

In 2011–12, Tobias Rieder breached the 40-goal mark, potting 42 goals and 85 points to lead the team offensively. The team returned to the Western Conference Final after a 4–1 series win in Round 1 vs. the Owen Sound Attack, a 4–3 series win vs. the Plymouth Whalers in Round 2, but were swept in Round 3 by the London Knights. Chief Operating Officer and Governor, Steve Bienkowski, was named the CHL's Executive of the Year.

The team slipped to fourth in the western conference standings in 2012–13 but advanced to Round 2 of the playoffs after a 4–1 series win over the Guelph Storm. The London Knights skated to a 4–1 series win of their own to end the Rangers' postseason. Ben Fanelli was named as both the winner of the Dan Snyder Memorial Award as the OHL's Humanitarian of the Year, and the CHL Humanitarian of the Year.

The team took a step back in 2013–14, falling to ninth place in the conference standings (22-41-2-3 = 49 points) and missing the playoffs for the first time since 2008–09. The finish led to the Rangers selecting second overall in the upcoming 2014 OHL Priority Selection where they chose left winger Adam Mascherin.

In 2014–15, the team saw a 25-point increase from the season prior, finishing 6th in the western conference with a record of 32-26-3-7 (74 points). They returned to the playoffs, but fell to the London Knights, 4–2, in the opening round.

The team improved by another 21 points the following season, finishing with a record of 44-17-5-2 (95 points) under the tutelage of new head coach Mike Van Ryn in 2015–16. Forwards Ryan MacInnis and Adam Mascherin led the team in points with 81, and Jeremy Bracco had the second-longest point streak in Rangers' franchise history from October 7 - December 9 (26 games), tallying 17 goals and 34 assists for 51 points in that span. The team advanced to the second round of the playoffs for the first time since 2012–13 with a 4–1 series win vs. the Windsor Spitfires before falling in four straight games to the London Knights in Round 2.

After one season behind the Rangers bench, head coach Mike Van Ryn left the team, and associate coach Jay McKee was named the team's new skipper in 2016–17. Adam Mascherin reached the 100-point milestone (35G, 63A) to lead the team in scoring. Down 2–1 in their opening round playoff series vs. the Owen Sound Attack, Rangers goaltender Luke Opilka made 64 saves on 70 shots in Game 4. Owen Sound outshot Kitchener 30–5 in the first period of play, 12–10 in the second, and 29–5 in the third for a game total of 71–20. The Attack would take the best-of-seven series in five games to eliminate the Rangers from the playoffs.

Prior to the 2017–18 season the team acquired defenceman, Memorial Cup champion and Waterloo native, Logan Stanley, from the Windsor Spitfires. Over the course of the season they also added players including Kole Sherwood, Givani Smith, Austin McEneny, Logan Brown and Mario. In the regular season, the team claimed its first Midwest Division championship (43-21-3-1, 90 points) in ten years. They claimed victories in both Round 1 (4-2 vs. Guelph) and Round 2 (4-2 vs. Sarnia) before meeting the CHL's top ranked Sault Ste. Marie Greyhounds in the Western Conference Final.

After a literal last-second goal gave the Greyhounds a 3–2 win in the Soo in Game 1, the 'Hounds went up 2–0 in the series following a 4–2, Game 2 win. When the series shifted back to Kitchener, Mario Culina backstopped the team to a 24-save, 3–0 shutout in Game 3, and a seven-goal offensive onslaught - powered by a four-point game by Joseph Garreffa - propelled the Rangers to a 7–4 win and tied the series, 2-2. The Rangers fell, 7–3, in Game 5 and played Game 6 back at The Aud two days later. The Rangers led, 3–2, late in the third period but the Greyhounds tied the game with a power play goal with just 1:25 to play, sending the game to overtime. Kole Sherwood extended the Rangers playoff hopes, and the series, by scoring the game-winning goal at 13:12 to force a deciding Game 7. In the clinching game, the teams exchanged goals throughout the night, the Rangers erasing 1-0 and 2-1 leads. With the Greyhounds leading 3–2 in the final minutes of regulation, Logan Stanley blasted a shot from the point that beat goaltender Matthew Villalta and tied the game, 3-3, with just 51 seconds remaining and sent the game to overtime. After a scoreless first overtime period, the game was finally decided in double OT when a Jack Kopacka shot deflected past Culina to win the series for the Greyhounds, affording them a berth into the Ontario Hockey League Final.

=== 2020s ===
The Rangers entered the 2022–23 playoffs as the eighth-seeded team, where they made OHL history by sweeping the first-seeded Windsor Spitfires to win the series 4–0 and advance to the second round.

In the 2024–25 playoffs, the Rangers made OHL history again, when they became the sixth team to complete a 4–0 series comeback, known as the reverse sweep, over the Spitfires to win the series 4–3 and advance to the Western Conference finals.

During the 2025-26 regular season the Kitchener Rangers would go on to finish with the best record in the Western Conference with 101 points, finishing with a record of 47-14-5-2, as they finished second overall in the OHL.

In the 2025-26 playoffs the Kitchener Rangers would face off against the number 8 seed Saginaw Spirit in the first round who they would beat in four games. In the second round the Rangers would end up facing the number 5 seed Sault Ste. Marie Greyhounds, who they would beat in five games. In the Western Conference Finals the Rangers would meet with the Windsor Spitfires for the second year in a row and the third time in four seasons. The Rangers would come out victorious against the Spitfires by winning the series in five games, to claim the Wayne Gretzky Trophy as Western Conference Champions. In the OHL Finals the Rangers would face off against the Eastern Conference Champions Barrie Colts. The Rangers would make quick work of the Colts as they beat them in four games to claim their 5th J. Ross Robertson Cup in franchise history, and their first since 2008. Sam O'Reilly was named playoff MVP.

==== 2026 Memorial Cup ====
The 2026 Memorial cup was played at Prospera Place in Kelowna, British Columbia. Kitchener represented the champions of the Ontario Hockey League. The Everett Silvertips represented the Western Hockey League led by 2027 NHL draft prospect Landon Dupont. The Chicoutimi Saguenéens represented the Quebec Maritimes Junior Hockey League led by 2024 NHL drafted forward Maxim Masse. The Kelowna Rockets of the Western Hockey League were the host team led by 2024 NHL drafted forward Tig Iginla.

Kitchener got through the round robin undefeated, by beating the Rockets 5–0 in the tournament opener, the Silvertips 6–2 in their second game and the Saguenéens 3–2 in their final game. By winning all three round robin games the Rangers secured a bye to the championship game. In the finals the Rangers would once again face the Silvertips for a chance at the Memorial Cup. The rangers got out to an early 1–0 lead in the first period thanks to a goal by Luke Ellinas, who deflected a point shot past the goalie. The Silvertips would respond 28 second later after Matias Vanahanen would score on a rebound chance from in close. The Rangers would once again take the lead with 6:45 to go in the first thanks to a breakaway goal by Dylan Edwards. The score would remain 2-1 until Jared Wolley scored a bar down goal with 4:34 to go in the second period. The Rangers would get off to a hot start in the third period with Jack Pridham scoring a 5 on 3 power play goal 26 seconds into the frame to give the Rangers a 4-1 Lead. Sam O'Reilly would score another powerplay goal 37 seconds later to give the rangers a 4-goal lead and make the score 5–1. At the 2:59 mark of the third period the Silvertips would claw one back when Carter Bear would score from in close to make it a 5–2 game. This would be as close at the Silvertips would get however, as with 1:37 to go in the game Christian Humphreys would score an empty net goal to seal the game at 6–2. With the win the Rangers secured their third Memorial Cup title and first since 2003.

== Championships ==
The Kitchener Rangers have appeared in the Memorial Cup seven times, winning three. They have won the J. Ross Robertson Cup five times, are seven-time Hamilton Spectator Trophy winners, and have won nine division titles.

	Hamilton Spectator Trophy (Most Points in the OHL)	Division Title	Wayne Gretzky Trophy (Western Conference Champions)	J. Ross Robertson Cup (OHL Champions)	Memorial Cup (CHL Champions)
1965–66	-	-	N/A	Lost to Oshawa Generals	-
1966–67	64 points	-	N/A	-	-
1967–68	82 points	-	-	Lost to Niagara Falls Flyers	-
1973–74	95 points	-	-	-	-
1980–81	-	Emms Trophy	-	WIN vs. Sault Ste. Marie Greyhounds	Lost to Cornwall Royals in championship final
1981–82	-	Emms Trophy	-	WIN vs. Ottawa 67's	WIN vs. Sherbrooke Castors
1983–84	106 points	Emms Trophy	-	Lost to Ottawa 67's	Lost to Ottawa 67's in championship final
1988–89	88 points	Emms Trophy	-	-	-
1989–90	-	-	-	Lost to Oshawa Generals	Lost to Oshawa Generals in championship final
1996–97	-	Emms Trophy	-	-	-
2002–03	100 points	Holody Trophy	WIN vs. Plymouth Whalers	WIN vs. Ottawa 67's	WIN vs. Hull Olympiques
2007–08	110 points	Holody Trophy	WIN vs. Sault Ste. Marie Greyhounds	WIN vs. Belleville Bulls	Lost to Spokane Chiefs in championship final
2009–10	-	-	Lost to Windsor Spitfires	-	-
2011–12	-	-	Lost to London Knights	-	-
2017–18	-	Holody Trophy	Lost to Sault Ste. Marie Greyhounds	-	-
2024–25	-	-	Lost to London Knights	-	-
2025–26	-	Holody Trophy	WIN vs. Windsor Spitfires	WIN vs. Barrie Colts	WIN vs. Everett Silvertips

== Coaches ==
There have been 24 coaches in the history of the Kitchener Rangers franchise.

- 1963–64 – Steve Brklacich
- 1964–65 – Floyd "Butch" Martin
- 1965–66 – Wally Kullman
- 1966–67 – Wally Kullman
- 1967–68 – Wally Kullman
- 1968–69 – Wally Kullman
- 1969–70 – Gerry Forler
- 1970–71 – Gerry Forler > Ron Murphy
- 1971–72 – Ron Murphy
- 1972–73 – Eddie Bush
- 1973–74 – Eddie Bush
- 1974–75 – Eddie Bush > Don McKee > Jim Morrison
- 1975–76 – Mac MacLean
- 1976–77 – Mac MacLean
- 1977–78 – Mac MacLean > Bob Ertel
- 1978–79 – Bob Ertel
- 1979–80 – Bob Ertel > Rod Seiling
- 1980–81 – Orval Tessier
- 1981–82 – Joe Crozier
- 1982–83 – Joe Crozier
- 1983–84 – Tom Barrett*
- 1984–85 – Tom Barrett
- 1985–86 – Tom Barrett
- 1986–87 – Tom Barrett > Joe McDonnell
- 1987–88 – Joe McDonnell
- 1988–89 – Joe McDonnell*^
- 1989–90 – Joe McDonnell
- 1990–91 – Joe McDonnell
- 1991–92 – Joe McDonnell
- 1992–93 – Joe McDonnell
- 1993–94 – Joe McDonnell
- 1994–95 – Joe McDonnell > Geoff Ward
- 1995–96 – Geoff Ward
- 1996–97 – Geoff Ward
- 1997–98 – Geoff Ward
- 1998–99 – Brian Hayton
- 1999–2000 – Brian Hayton > Jeff Snyder
- 2000–01 – Jeff Snyder
- 2001–02 – Peter DeBoer
- 2002–03 – Peter DeBoer
- 2003–04 – Peter DeBoer
- 2004–05 – Peter DeBoer
- 2005–06 – Peter DeBoer
- 2006–07 – Peter DeBoer
- 2007–08 – Peter DeBoer
- 2008–09 – Steve Spott
- 2009–10 – Steve Spott
- 2010–11 – Steve Spott
- 2011–12 – Steve Spott
- 2012–13 – Steve Spott
- 2013–14 – Troy Smith
- 2014–15 – Troy Smith
- 2015–16 – Mike Van Ryn
- 2016–17 – Jay McKee
- 2017–18 – Jay McKee
- 2018–19 – Jay McKee
- 2019–20 – Jay McKee > Mike McKenzie
- 2021–22 – Mike McKenzie
- 2022–23 – Chris Dennis > Mike McKenzie
- 2023–24 – Jussi Ahokas
- 2024–25 – Jussi Ahokas*
- 2025–26 – Jussi Ahokas
- 2026–27 – Jeff Kyrzakos

*OHL Coach of the Year (Matt Leyden Trophy)

^CHL Coach of the Year

== Players ==
=== Honoured numbers ===
The Rangers do not retire numbers (except for the no. 1 which is dedicated to the fans) but choose to honour numbers instead; hanging banners from the rafters while still having them in use for present players. Honoured numbers include five Rangers alumni who were later elected into the Hockey Hall of Fame: # 3 Scott Stevens, # 4 Al MacInnis, # 6 Paul Coffey, # 7 Bill Barber', # 19 Larry Robinson.

Two other numbers are also raised to the rafters of the Kitchener Memorial Auditorium, honouring two former Rangers who lost their lives at a young age: # 21 Gary Crosby, and # 22 Jim McGeachie. Crosby was a member of the Rangers for two seasons from 1968 to 1970. He was killed at age 20, on July 29, 1972, in a head-on collision on Highway 7. McGeachie was a member of the Rangers for two seasons from 1978 to 1980. He was tragically killed at age 19 in May 1980, after a vehicle collision on Highway 9.

=== NHL/WHA alumni ===
The Rangers have 186 alumni who have played in the National Hockey League or World Hockey Association. Five alumni have been elected into the Hockey Hall of Fame: Bill Barber, Paul Coffey, Al MacInnis, Larry Robinson and Scott Stevens.

- Russ Adam
- Chris Ahrens
- Jason Akeson
- Claire Alexander
- John Baby
- Justin Bailey
- Reid Bailey
- Peter Bakovic
- Terry Ball
- Bill Barber
- Brian Bellows
- Andre Benoit
- Bob Blanchet
- Mikkel Boedker
- Dennis Bonvie
- Robert Bortuzzo
- Rick Bourbonnais
- Logan Brown
- David Bruce
- Garrett Burnett
- Shawn Burr
- Brian Bye
- Jerry Byers
- Gregory Campbell
- Tom Cassidy
- Rick Chartraw
- David Clarkson
- Paul Coffey
- Bob Cook
- Frank Corrado
- Lou Crawford
- Andrew Crescenzi
- Dave Cressman
- Jerry D'Amigo
- Patrick Davis
- Peter DeBoer
- Ab DeMarco
- Boyd Devereaux
- Gilbert Dionne
- Pete Donnelly
- Jamie Doornbosch
- Rob Dopson
- Steve Downie
- Mike Duco
- Denis Dupere
- Mike Eagles
- Tim Ecclestone
- Don Edwards
- Jack Egers
- Steve Eminger
- Paul Evans
- Trevor Fahey
- Radek Faksa
- Sandy Fitzpatrick
- Joe Fortunato
- Dwight Foster
- Mark Fraser
- Jody Gage
- John Gibson
- Gaston Gingras
- Brian Glenwright
- David Haas
- Matt Halischuk
- Kevin Henderson
- Paul Higgins
- Dan Hinton
- Mike Hoffman
- Paul Hoganson
- Ralph Hopiavouri
- Mike Hough
- Dale Hunter
- Larry Huras
- Bob Hurlburt
- Lee Inglis
- Robbie Irons
- Bob Jones
- Jim Jones
- Nazem Kadri
- Petr Kanko
- Gord Kannegiesser
- Sheldon Kannegiesser
- Jakub Kindl
- Jim Krulicki
- Gary Kurt
- Nick Kypreos
- Gabriel Landeskog
- Jeff Larmer
- Matt Lashoff
- David Latta
- Don "Red" Laurence
- Ray LeBlanc
- Randy Legge
- Hank Lehvonen
- Josh Leivo
- Chris LiPuma
- Don Luce
- Chuck Luksa
- Brett MacDonald
- Al MacInnis
- Dave Maloney
- Don Maloney
- Eric Manlow
- Grant Martin
- Brandon Mashinter
- Steve Mason
- Brad Maxwell
- Dennis McCord
- Darwin McCutcheon
- Joe McDonnell
- Evan McEneny
- Dave McLlwain
- Sean McMorrow
- Julian Melchiori
- Chris Meloff
- Max Middendorf
- Tom Miller
- Mike Moher
- John Moore
- Jason Morgan
- Jeremy Morin
- Ryan Murphy
- Jim Nahrgang
- Cam Newton
- Claude Noel
- Joe Noris
- Gerry O'Flaherty
- Victor Oreskovich
- Billy Orr
- Bob Parent
- Jim Pavese
- Serge Payer
- Kent Paynter
- Andrew Peters
- Walt Poddubny
- Paul Pooley
- Wayne Presley
- Shane Prince
- Matt Puempel
- Tyler Randell
- Jake Rathwell
- Paul Reinhart
- Steven Rice
- Mike Richards
- Glen Richardson
- Tobias Rieder
- Doug Risebrough
- Larry Robinson
- Mike Robitaille
- Allan Rourke
- Derek Roy
- Darren Rumble
- Warren Rychel
- Gary Sabourin
- Jim Sandlak
- Ted Scharf
- Ron Sedlbauer
- Dan Seguin
- Sean Shanahan
- David Shaw
- Doug Shedden
- Jeff Skinner
- Nick Spaling
- Steve Spott
- Mike Stevens
- Scott Stevens
- Shayne Stevenson
- Bill Stewart
- Peter Sturgeon
- Doug Sulliman
- Orval Tessier
- Ben Thomson
- Scott Timmins
- Walt Tkaczuk
- Kirk Tomlinson
- Mike Torchia
- John Tucker
- Boris Valabik
- Phil Varone
- Todd Warriner
- Yannick Weber
- Rob Whistle
- Tony White
- Bob Whitlock
- Brian Wilks
- Craig Wolanin
- Bennett Wolf
- Jason York
- Arber Xhekaj
- Wendell Young

== Award recipients ==
=== Ontario Hockey League awards ===
Members of the Kitchener Rangers have been named recipients of OHL awards 41 times.

Season	Player	Award	Description
1967–68	Walt Tkaczuk	Red Tilson Trophy	Most outstanding player
1973–74	Don Edwards	Dave Pinkney Trophy	Lowest team GAA
1976–77	Dwight Foster	Eddie Powers Memorial Trophy	Top scorer
1982–83	Al MacInnis	Max Kaminsky Trophy	Defenceman of the year
1983–84	Shawn Burr	Emms Family Award	Rookie of the year
1983–84	Wayne Presley	Jim Mahon Memorial Trophy	Top scoring right winger
1983–84	John Tucker	Red Tilson Trophy	Most outstanding player
1983–84	Tom Barrett	Matt Leyden Trophy	Coach of the year
1986–87	Ron Goodall	Jim Mahon Memorial Trophy	Top scoring right winger
1988–89	Joe McDonnell	Matt Leyden Trophy	Coach of the year
1988–89	Gus Morschauser	Goaltender of the year	
1990–91	Mike Torchia	Goaltender of the year	
1990–91	Joey St. Aubin	Leo Lalonde Memorial Trophy	Top overage player
1992–93	Tim Spitzig	Bobby Smith Trophy	Scholastic player of the year
1995–96	Boyd Devereaux	Bobby Smith Trophy	Scholastic player of the year
1996–97	Shawn Degagne	F. W. "Dinty" Moore Trophy	Lowest rookie GAA
1999–2000	Derek Roy	Emms Family Award	Rookie of the year
2002–03	Steve Bienkowski	Executive of the year	
2002–03	Derek Roy	Wayne Gretzky 99 Award	Playoff MVP
2003–04	Andre Benoit	William Hanley Trophy	Most sportsmanlike player
2004–05	Andre Benoit	Leo Lalonde Memorial Trophy	Top overage player
2005–06	Mark Packwood	Dave Pinkney Trophy	Lowest team GAA
2005–06	Dan Turple	Dave Pinkney Trophy	Lowest team GAA
2007–08	Nick Spaling	William Hanley Trophy	Most sportsmanlike player
2007–08	Josh Unice	F. W. "Dinty" Moore Trophy	Lowest rookie GAA
2007–08	Justin Azevedo	Eddie Powers Memorial Trophy	Top scorer
2007–08	Justin Azevedo	Red Tilson Trophy	Most outstanding player
2007–08	Justin Azevedo	Wayne Gretzky 99 Award	Playoff MVP
2010–11	Jason Akeson	Eddie Powers Memorial Trophy	Top scorer
2010–11	Jason Akeson	Jim Mahon Memorial Trophy	Top scoring right winger
2010–11	Jason Akeson	William Hanley Trophy	Most sportsmanlike player
2010–11	Jason Akeson	Leo Lalonde Memorial Trophy	Top overage player
2011–12	Steve Bienkowski	Executive of the year	
2012–13	Ben Fanelli	Dan Snyder Memorial Award	Humanitarian of the year
2019–20	Jacob Ingham	Dan Snyder Memorial Award	Humanitarian of the year
2021–22	Steve Bienlowski	Bill Long Award	Distinguished service
2023–24	Matthew Sop	Leo Lalonde Memorial Trophy	Top overage player
2023–24	Hunter Brzustewicz	Ted Baker Award	Teammate of the year
2024–25	Jackson Parsons	Jim Rutherford Trophy	Goaltender of the year
2024–25	Jackson Parsons	Leo Lalonde Memorial Trophy	Top overage player
2024–25	Jussi Ahokas	Matt Leyden Trophy	Coach of the year
2025–26	Jack Pridham	Leo Lalonde Memorial Trophy	Top overage player
2025–26	Sam O'Reilly	Red Tilson Trophy	Most outstanding player
2025–26	Matthew Andonovski	Ted Baker Award	Teammate of the year
2025–26	Sam O'Reilly	Wayne Gretzky 99 Award	Playoff MVP

== Arena ==
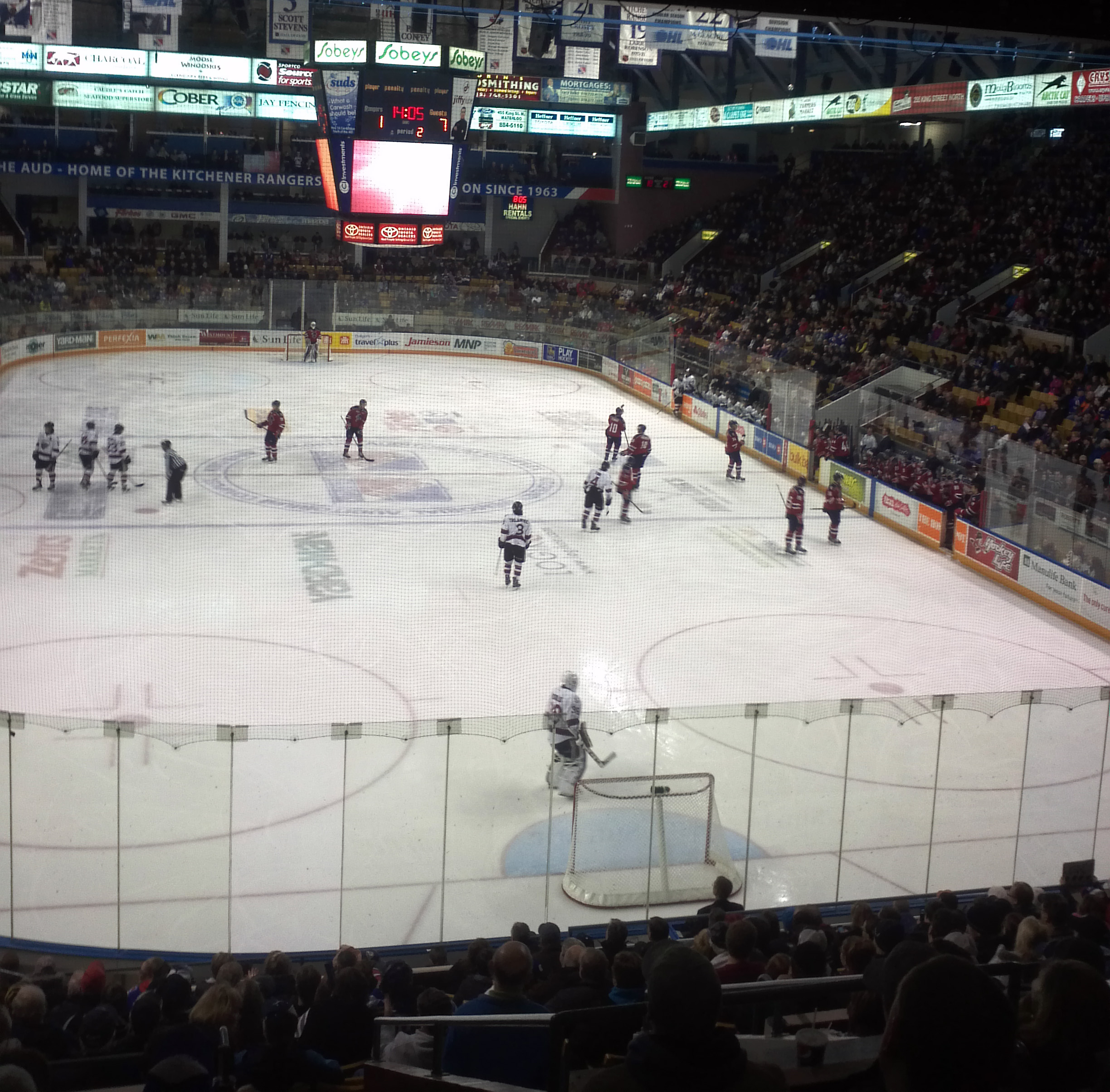
The Kitchener Rangers playing at the Kitchener Memorial Auditorium Complex against the Guelph Storm in 2014.

The Kitchener Rangers play home games at the Kitchener Memorial Auditorium Complex. The Auditorium was built in 1951 and underwent major renovations in 2002. In 2007–08, over 500 seats were added to accommodate larger crowds for the 2008 Memorial Cup. Over the 2012 off-season, The Aud was once again expanded with the addition of close to 1,000 seats, as well as an upper concourse and improvements to team dressing rooms and business offices. The Kitchener Memorial Auditorium Complex includes Jack Couch Park for baseball, Kiwanis and Kinsmen ice pads in the arena, and the main Auditorium arena known as the Dom Cardillo Arena. Centennial Stadium (football) was demolished in Spring, 2013 due to safety concerns.

- Capacity = 7,068 seats + 632 standing room = total capacity of 7,700
- Ice size = 192' x 85'

The Auditorium hosted the Memorial Cup tournament in 1962, 1975, 1984 and 2008. The OHL All-Star Game was played there in 1980 & 1985 as well as the CHL Top Prospects Game in 2003 and in 2021.

On May 13, 2025, the Kitchener Rangers announced a multi-million dollar major renovation project that will enhance the team's dressing room, player lounge, and business offices at the Kitchener Memorial Auditorium. The more than $2 million project will begin in May 2025, and be completed in time for the beginning of the 2025/26 OHL season. This is the largest renovation at the Aud, since 2012. The City of Kitchener, has also approved an additional $2 million project to renovate the existing Subscribers Lounge into a second restaurant at the Aud, with seating for 120 guests. The combined $4.5 million project will be completed during the summer of 2025, ahead of the season start in October.

== Season-by-season results ==
Regular season and playoffs results:

Legend: GP = Games played, W = Wins, L = Losses, T = Ties, OTL = Overtime losses, SL = Shoot-out losses, Pts = Points, GF = Goals for, GA = Goals against

Memorial Cup champions	OHL champions	OHL finalists

Season	Regular season											Playoffs
Season	GP	W	L	T	OTL	SOL	Pts	Pct	GF	GA	Finish	Playoffs
1963–64	56	9	41	6	—	—	24	0.214	142	316	8th OHA	Did not qualify
1964–65	56	19	32	5	—	—	43	0.384	225	284	6th OHA	Did not qualify
1965–66	48	16	23	9	—	—	41	0.427	160	183	7th OHA	Won quarterfinal (Niagara Falls Flyers) 8–4; Won semifinal (Toronto Marlboros) 9–7; Lost OHL championship (Oshawa Generals) 8–2
1966–67	48	28	12	8	—	—	64	0.667	213	164	1st OHA	Won quarterfinal (St. Catharines Black Hawks) 9–3; Lost semifinal (Toronto Marlboros) 9–5
1967–68	54	38	10	6	—	—	82	0.759	326	175	1st OHA	Won quarterfinal (Toronto Marlboros) 8–2; Won semifinal (Hamilton Red Wings) 9–5; Lost OHL championship (Niagara Falls Flyers) 4–3–1
1968–69	54	9	40	5	—	—	23	0.213	155	310	10th OHA	Did not qualify
1969–70	54	22	28	4	—	—	48	0.444	210	236	7th OHA	Lost quarterfinal (St. Catharines Black Hawks) 8–4
1970–71	62	26	32	4	—	—	56	0.452	267	283	6th OHA	Lost quarterfinal (St. Catharines Black Hawks) 8–0
1971–72	63	31	24	8	—	—	70	0.556	317	259	5th OHA	Lost quarterfinal (Toronto Marlboros) 8–2
1972–73	63	16	41	6	—	—	38	0.302	244	368	8th OHA	Lost quarterfinal (London Knights) 8–0
1973–74	70	43	18	9	—	—	95	0.679	377	229	1st OHA	Won quarterfinal (Sudbury Wolves) 8–0; Lost semifinal (Peterborough Petes) 8–0
1974–75	70	17	47	6	—	—	40	0.286	239	351	11th OMJHL	Did not qualify
1975–76	66	26	35	5	—	—	57	0.432	298	384	4th Emms	Won preliminary round (St. Catharines Black Hawks) 6–2; Lost quarterfinal (Hamilton Fincups) 8–0
1976–77	66	26	32	8	—	—	60	0.455	320	380	4th Emms	Lost preliminary round (Windsor Spitfires) 3–0
1977–78	68	26	34	8	—	—	60	0.441	270	303	4th Emms	Won preliminary round (Toronto Marlboros) 6–4; Lost quarterfinal (London Knights) 8–0
1978–79	68	29	35	4	—	—	62	0.456	316	356	4th Emms	Won preliminary round (Toronto Marlboros) 6–0; Lost quarterfinal (Niagara Falls Flyers) 8–6
1979–80	68	17	51	0	—	—	34	0.250	276	425	6th Emms	Did not qualify
1980–81	68	34	33	1	—	—	69	0.507	321	320	1st Emms	Won quarterfinal (Niagara Falls Flyers) 9–5; Won semifinal (Windsor Spitfires) 9–1; Won OHL championship (Sault Ste. Marie Greyhounds) 9–3; Lost 1981 Memorial Cup final (Cornwall Royals) 5–2
1981–82	68	44	21	3	—	—	91	0.669	322	247	1st Emms	Won quarterfinal (Windsor Spitfires) 8–0; Won semifinal (Sault Ste. Marie Greyhounds) 9–3; Won OHL championship (Ottawa 67's) 9–1; Won 1982 Memorial Cup final (Sherbrooke Castors) 7–4
1982–83	70	45	23	2	—	—	92	0.657	393	292	2nd Emms	Won quarterfinal (North Bay Centennials) 8–2; Lost semifinal (Sault Ste. Marie Greyhounds) 8–2
1983–84	70	52	16	2	—	—	106	0.757	418	276	1st Emms	Won quarterfinal (London Knights) 8–0; Won semifinal (Sault Ste. Marie Greyhounds) 8–6; Lost OHL championship (Ottawa 67's) 8–2; Lost 1984 Memorial Cup final (Ottawa 67's) 7–2 (Note: Kitchener qualified for the 1984 Memorial Cup as tournament hosts)
1984–85	66	27	35	4	—	—	58	0.439	282	319	6th Emms	Lost division quarterfinal (Sault Ste. Marie Greyhounds) 8–0
1985–86	66	35	27	4	—	—	86	0.561	330	240	3rd Emms	Lost division quarterfinal (Windsor Spitfires) 8–2
1986–87	66	32	31	3	—	—	67	0.508	293	305	4th Emms	Lost quarterfinal (North Bay Centennials) 4–0
1987–88	66	26	39	1	—	—	53	0.402	263	329	6th Emms	Lost division quarterfinal (Windsor Spitfires) 4–0
1988–89	66	41	19	6	—	—	88	0.667	318	251	1st Emms	Lost division quarterfinal (North Bay Centennials) 4–1
1989–90	66	38	21	7	—	—	83	0.629	358	259	2nd Emms	Won division quarterfinal (North Bay Centennials) 4–1; Bye through quarterfinal Won semifinal (Niagara Falls Thunder) 4–1; Lost OHL championship (Oshawa Generals) 4–3; Lost 1990 Memorial Cup final (Oshawa Generals) 4–3 (2OT) (Note: Kitchener qualified for the 1990 Memorial Cup as league finalists)
1990–91	66	28	30	8	—	—	64	0.485	301	293	5th Emms	Lost division quarterfinal (Niagara Falls Thunder) 4–2
1991–92	66	29	30	7	—	—	65	0.492	283	282	4th Emms	Won division quarterfinal (Windsor Spitfires) 4–3; Lost quarterfinal (Sault Ste. Marie Greyhounds) 4–3
1992–93	66	26	31	9	—	—	61	0.462	280	314	6th Emms	Lost division quarterfinal (London Knights) 4–3
1993–94	66	32	30	4	—	—	68	0.515	286	316	6th Emms	Lost division quarterfinal (Owen Sound Platers) 4–1
1994–95	66	18	42	6	—	—	42	0.318	216	296	5th Central	Lost division quarterfinal (Sudbury Wolves) 4–1
1995–96	66	35	28	3	—	—	73	0.553	253	230	2nd Central	Won division quarterfinal (Barrie Colts) 4–3; Lost quarterfinal (Detroit Whalers) 4–1
1996–97	66	34	22	10	—	—	78	0.591	274	235	1st Central	Won quarterfinal (Sarnia Sting) 4–3; Lost semifinal (Oshawa Generals) 4–2
1997–98	66	27	29	10	—	—	64	0.485	224	239	3rd Central	Lost division quarterfinal (Owen Sound Platers) 4–2
1998–99	68	23	39	6	—	—	52	0.382	205	257	4th Midwest	Lost 8th-place tie-breaker (Windsor Spitfires) 2–1
1999–2000	68	28	30	6	4	—	66	0.485	229	256	2nd Midwest	Lost conference quarterfinal (Sault Ste. Marie Greyhounds) 4–1
2000–01	68	26	36	6	0	—	58	0.426	218	247	5th Midwest	Did not qualify
2001–02	68	35	22	10	1	—	81	0.596	257	190	3rd Midwest	Lost conference quarterfinal (Guelph Storm) 4–0
2002–03	68	46	14	5	3	—	100	0.735	275	188	1st Midwest	Won conference quarterfinal (Sault Ste. Marie Greyhounds) 4–0; Won conference semifinal (Guelph Storm) 4–1; Won conference final (Plymouth Whalers) 4–3; Won OHL championship (Ottawa 67's) 4–1; Won 2003 Memorial Cup final (Hull Olympiques) 6–3
2003–04	68	34	26	6	2	—	76	0.559	254	235	3rd Midwest	Lost conference quarterfinal (Plymouth Whalers) 4–1
2004–05	68	35	20	9	4	—	83	0.610	235	187	3rd Midwest	Won conference quarterfinal (Erie Otters) 4–2; Won conference semifinal (Owen Sound Attack) 4–0; Lost conference final (London Knights) 4–1
2005–06	68	47	19	—	1	1	96	0.706	255	165	2nd Midwest	Lost conference quarterfinal (Owen Sound Attack) 4–1
2006–07	68	47	17	—	1	3	98	0.721	262	187	2nd Midwest	Won conference quarterfinal (Sarnia Sting) 4–0; Lost conference semifinal (Plymouth Whalers) 4–1
2007–08	68	53	11	—	1	3	110	0.809	289	174	1st Midwest	Won conference quarterfinal (Plymouth Whalers) 4–0; Won conference semifinal (Sarnia Sting) 4–0; Won conference final (Sault Ste. Marie Greyhounds) 4–1; Won OHL championship (Belleville Bulls) 4–3; Lost 2008 Memorial Cup final (Spokane Chiefs) 4–1
2008–09	68	26	37	—	3	2	57	0.419	208	254	5th Midwest	Did not qualify
2009–10	68	42	19	—	4	3	91	0.669	286	236	2nd Midwest	Won conference quarterfinal (Saginaw Spirit) 4–2; Won quarterfinal (London Knights) 4–3; Lost semifinal (Windsor Spitfires) 4–3
2010–11	68	38	21	—	4	5	85	0.625	256	217	2nd Midwest	Lost conference quarterfinal (Plymouth Whalers) 4–3
2011–12	68	42	24	—	1	1	86	0.632	253	211	2nd Midwest	Won conference quarterfinal (Owen Sound Attack) 4–1; Won conference semifinal (Plymouth Whalers) 4–3; Lost conference final (London Knights) 4–0
2012–13	68	39	20	—	1	8	87	0.640	216	185	3rd Midwest	Won conference quarterfinal (Guelph Storm) 4–1; Lost conference semifinal (London Knights) 4–1
2013–14	68	22	41	—	2	3	49	0.360	200	280	5th Midwest	Did not qualify
2014–15	68	32	26	—	3	7	74	0.544	216	221	5th Midwest	Lost conference quarterfinal (London Knights) 4–2
2015–16	68	44	17	—	5	2	95	0.699	256	197	3rd Midwest	Won conference quarterfinal (Windsor Spitfires) 4–1; Lost conference semifinal (London Knights) 4–0
2016–17	68	36	27	—	3	2	77	0.566	244	251	4th Midwest	Lost conference quarterfinal (Owen Sound Attack) 4–1
2017–18	68	43	21	—	3	1	90	0.662	246	218	1st Midwest	Won conference quarterfinal (Guelph Storm) 4–2; Won conference semifinal (Sarnia Sting) 4–2; Lost conference final (Sault Ste. Marie Greyhounds) 4–3
2018–19	68	34	30	—	3	1	72	0.529	251	267	3rd Midwest	Lost conference quarterfinal (Guelph Storm) 4–0
2019–20	63	40	16	—	5	2	87	0.690	264	213	2nd Midwest	Playoffs cancelled due to the COVID-19 pandemic
2020–21	Season cancelled due to the COVID-19 pandemic											
2021–22	68	30	31	—	5	2	67	0.493	236	271	4th Midwest	Won conference quarterfinal (London Knights) 4–3; Lost conference semifinal (Windsor Spitfires) 4–1
2022–23	68	33	29	—	6	0	72	0.532	258	245	4th Midwest	Won conference quarterfinal (Windsor Spitfires) 4–0; Lost conference semifinal (London Knights) 4–1
2023–24	68	41	23	—	4	0	86	0.632	290	225	2nd Midwest	Won conference quarterfinal (Erie Otters) 4–2; Lost conference semifinal (London Knights) 4–0
2024–25	68	47	15	—	4	2	100	0.735	254	183	2nd Midwest	Won conference quarterfinal (Flint Firebirds) 4–1; Won conference semifinal vs. (Windsor Spitfires) 4–3; Lost conference final vs. (London Knights) 4–0
2025–26	68	47	14	—	5	2	101	0.743	261	179	1st Midwest	Won conference quarterfinal (Saginaw Spirit) 4–0; Won conference semifinal (Sault Ste. Marie Greyhounds) 4–1; Won conference final (Windsor Spitfires) 4–1; Won OHL championship (Barrie Colts) 4–0; Won 2026 Memorial Cup final (Everett Silvertips) 6–2
