= Jeff Larmer =

Canadian ice hockey player

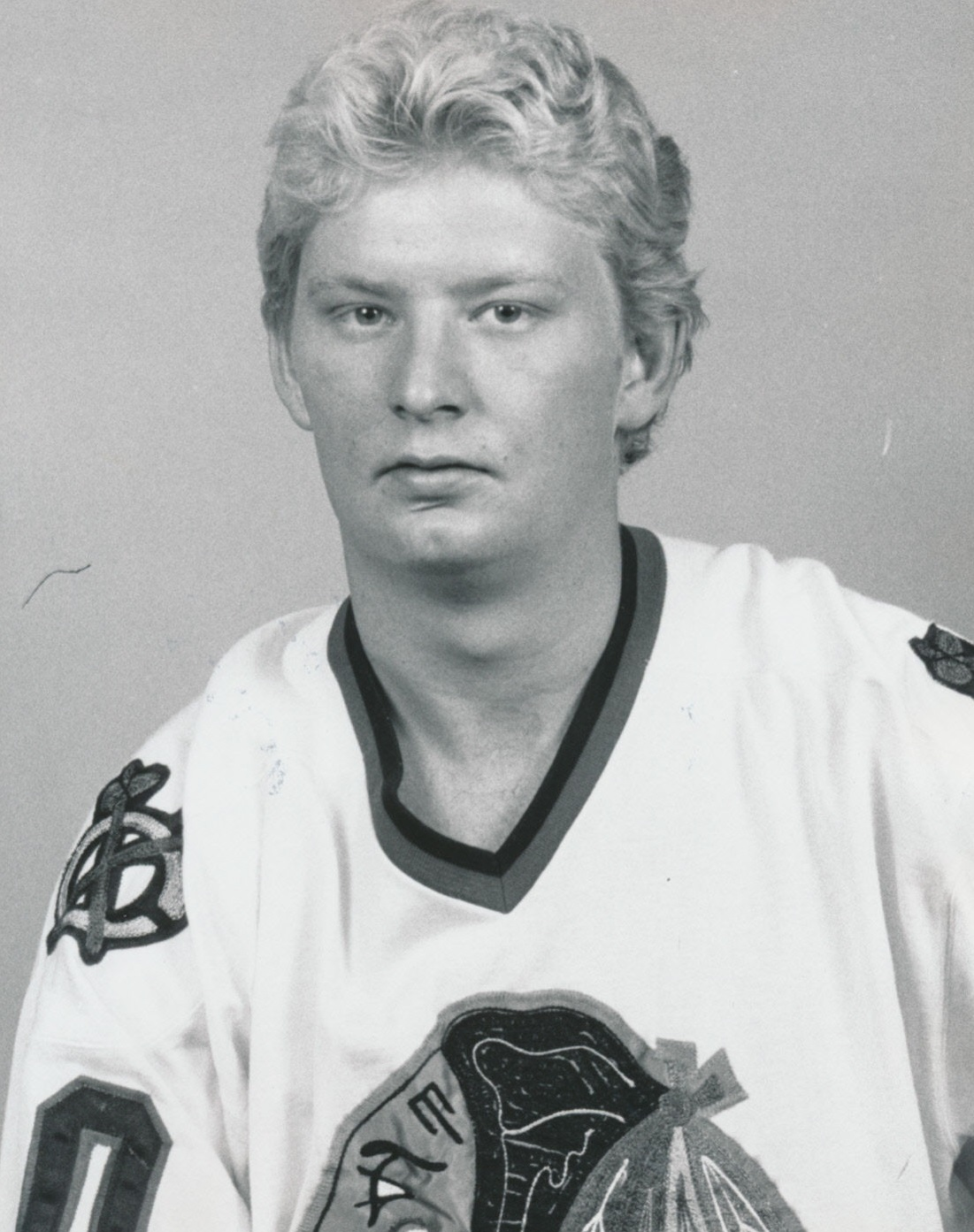
- Larmer in 1984
- Born: November 10, 1962 (age 63) Peterborough, Ontario, Canada
- Height: 5 ft 10 in (178 cm)
- Weight: 175 lb (79 kg; 12 st 7 lb)
- Position: Left wing
- Shot: Left
- Played for: Colorado Rockies; New Jersey Devils; Chicago Black Hawks
- NHL draft: 129th overall, 1981; Colorado Rockies
- Playing career: 1982–1994

Jeffrey Larmer (born November 10, 1962) is a Canadian former professional ice hockey player who played 158 games in the National Hockey League. He played with the Colorado Rockies, New Jersey Devils and the Chicago Black Hawks.

After his hockey career, he started teaching at Connaught Public School, and then later, he switched to Mountain View Elementary School in Collingwood Ontario before retiring in 2022. Larmer was born in Peterborough, Ontario. As a youth, he played in the 1975 Quebec International Pee-Wee Hockey Tournament with a minor ice hockey team from Peterborough. Larmer holds the record for most points in a Memorial Cup, having scored 16 points in the 1982 Memorial Cup. The record was tied by Guy Rouleau in 1986.

He is the younger brother of the former NHL star Steve Larmer.

== Career statistics ==
			Regular season					Playoffs
Season	Team	League	GP	G	A	Pts	PIM	GP	G	A	Pts	PIM
1978–79	Peterborough Bees	OHA-B	40	29	23	52	27	—	—	—	—	—
1979–80	Kitchener Rangers	OHL	61	19	27	46	80	—	—	—	—	—
1980–81	Kitchener Rangers	OHL	68	54	54	108	103	16	12	16	28	27
1981–82	Kitchener Rangers	OHL	48	51	44	95	95	15	21	14	35	16
1981–82	Colorado Rockies	NHL	8	1	1	2	8	—	—	—	—	—
1982–83	New Jersey Devils	NHL	65	21	24	45	21	—	—	—	—	—
1982–83	Wichita Wind	CHL	10	6	5	11	2	—	—	—	—	—
1983–84	New Jersey Devils	NHL	40	6	13	19	8	—	—	—	—	—
1983–84	Chicago Blackhawks	NHL	36	9	13	22	20	5	1	0	1	2
1984–85	Chicago Blackhawks	NHL	7	0	0	0	0	—	—	—	—	—
1984–85	Milwaukee Admirals	IHL	64	21	37	61	30	—	—	—	—	—
1985–86	Chicago Blackhawks	NHL	2	0	0	0	0	—	—	—	—	—
1985–86	Nova Scotia Oilers	AHL	77	20	44	64	46	—	—	—	—	—
1988–89	HC Davos	NLA	2	2	2	4	0	—	—	—	—	—
1988–89	Solihull Barons	BHL	16	23	25	48	14	—	—	—	—	—
1989–90	EC Nordhorn	Germany3	12	24	21	45	16	10	8	11	19	14
1991–92	Milwaukee Admirals	IHL	76	27	35	62	22	5	1	4	5	4
1992–93	Milwaukee Admirals	IHL	78	31	34	65	46	6	0	2	2	2
1993–94	Milwaukee Admirals	IHL	25	2	9	11	14	1	0	0	0	0
NHL totals			158	37	51	88	57	5	1	0	1	2
IHL totals			243	81	115	199	112	12	1	6	7	6
