= Brian Bellows =

Canadian ice hockey player (born 1964)

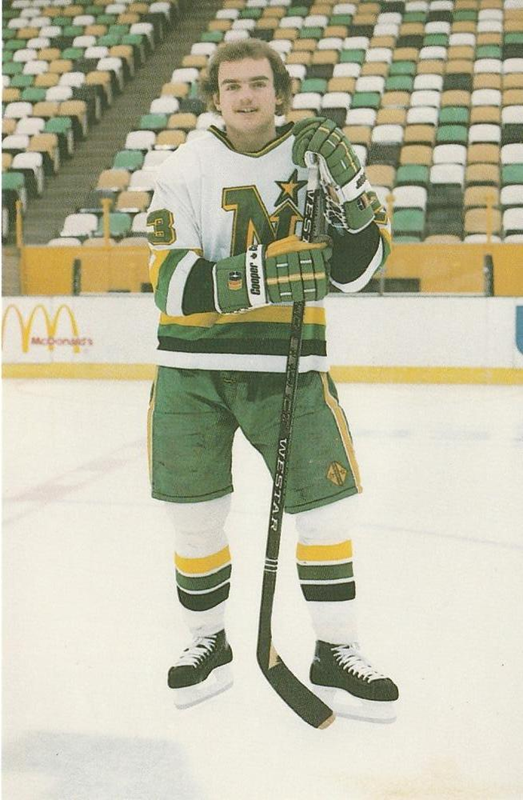
- Bellows with the Minnesota North Stars in 1985
- Born: September 1, 1964 (age 62) St. Catharines, Ontario, Canada
- Height: 5 ft 11 in (180 cm)
- Weight: 210 lb (95 kg; 15 st 0 lb)
- Position: Winger
- Shot: Right
- Played for: Minnesota North Stars; Montreal Canadiens; Tampa Bay Lightning; Mighty Ducks of Anaheim; Washington Capitals; Berlin Capitals
- National team: Canada
- NHL draft: 2nd overall, 1982; Minnesota North Stars
- Playing career: 1982–1999
Medal record
Representing Canada
Men's ice hockey
Canada Cup
Gold medal – first place	1984 Canada
World Championship
Silver medal – second place	1989 Sweden

Brian Edward Bellows (born September 1, 1964) is a Canadian former professional ice hockey player. He played as a winger in the National Hockey League (NHL) for 17 seasons with the Minnesota North Stars, Montreal Canadiens, Tampa Bay Lightning, Mighty Ducks of Anaheim, and Washington Capitals.

Bellows excelled in the junior leagues for the Kitchener Rangers, where he led them to appearances in the championship game in both 1981 and 1982, which culminated with them winning the event in the latter year; Bellows set a record for the fastest goal in tournament history at 11 seconds and in the championship game, he recorded five points. Projected as one of the best prospects for the 1982 NHL draft, he was selected with the second overall pick by the Minnesota North Stars.

He recorded 20-goal seasons in each of his first twelve seasons, with his peak coming with the 1989–90 season, where he scored 55 goals to tie the franchise record (a mark that has not been surpassed) to go with a career-high 99 points. He recorded 29 points in the 1991 Stanley Cup playoffs to lead the North Stars to the Stanley Cup Final, which they lost in six games. He was traded by the North Stars in the 1992 offseason to the Montreal Canadiens; he departed as the all-time goal scorer in North Star history. With Montreal, he scored 40 goals in the 1992–93 season and subsequently recorded six goals in 18 playoff games that year as the team won the Stanley Cup Final.

He had one more 30-goal season with Montreal before being traded to the Lightning in the 1995 offseason, where he scored his final 20-goal season prior to being traded to Anaheim. Playing part-time for the Berlin Capitals to start the 1997–98 season, he was recruited to play for the Capitals as a free agent in March of 1998 and recorded 13 points in their run to the Stanley Cup Final. He played one more season with the Capitals and recorded his 1,000th career point in his final season in 1999. Internationally, he represented Canada on four occasions from 1984 to 1990, which saw him win the Canada Cup in 1984 and finish second at the Ice Hockey World Championships in 1989. A three-time All-Star selection, he retired with 485 goals and 537 assists in 1,188 games.

== Early life ==
Bellows was born in St. Catharines, Ontario. In the Junior B level of his hometown, he scored 50 goals and 130 points and was drafted as the first overall pick by the Kitchener Rangers of the Ontario Hockey League prior to the 1980–81 OHL season. He soon became captain of the team and in 113 games spread out over two seasons, he had 94 goals and 119 assists.

During this time, he was featured in Sports Illustrated, which described him as the hottest prospect since Wayne Gretzky. In his two seasons with Kitchener, he captained the team to two consecutive Ontario Hockey League championships and appearances in the championship game of the Memorial Cup, which saw them win the trophy on their second attempt by a score of 7–4 vs the Sherbrooke Beavers. Bellows had three goals and two assists in the championship game.

In 2025, the Rangers announced that Bellows would be enshrined in the newly established Level of Legacy. His induction ceremony was held on January 9, 2026 prior to the home game against the Oshawa Generals.

== Playing career ==
In the 1982 draft, the Minnesota North Stars held the second pick in the draft by circumstance. Previously, in August 1981, the team (as led by general manager Lou Nanne) made a trade with the Detroit Red Wings that sent Don Murdoch, Greg Smith and the top draft choice in the 1982 draft in exchange for the top pick of the Red Wings in that same draft. As it turned out, Minnesota got the 2nd pick in the draft while Detroit got the 17th pick (they later used the pick on Murray Craven). Prior to draft day, Nanne made a deal with the Boston Bruins that sent Brad Palmer and Dave Donnelly to the Bruins in exchange for Boston not selecting Bellows (the Bruins went on to select Gord Kluzak). In his rookie season, Bellows had his first goal for a three-point night in his second game as a player against the Detroit Red Wings and ultimately had 35 goals with 30 assists in 78 games. In the playoffs that year, Bellows scored nine points (five goals, four assists) in nine games.

When team captain Craig Hartsburg was injured partway through the 1983–84 season, Bellows was named interim captain for the remainder of the season. At 19 years and 4 months, Bellows became captain at an earlier age than Connor McDavid, Gabriel Landeskog and Sidney Crosby. However, because Bellows was an interim captain, McDavid is still considered the youngest captain in history. Prior to the start of the 1984–85 season, Bellows was selected to represent Canada for the 1984 Canada Cup. He had one assist in the tournament, which Canada won over Sweden. In the 1985–86 season, Bellows set a franchise record streak by recording a point in twenty straight games (which saw him record 11 goals and 18 assists in that span) from January 11 to February 21; the record still stands as of 2026.

Bellows played 10 seasons with the North Stars and was popular in Minnesota for his charity work, as well as his goal-scoring. Bellows made the roster of the Canadian team for the 1989 World Ice Hockey Championships that was played in April and May. He was named the best forward as Canada finished in second place. He peaked in goals with 55 goals with 44 assists in 80 games of the 1989–90 season. for a career-high 99 points. He was named to the Second Team of the NHL All-Star team. In the 1990–91 season, Bellows had 35 goals and 40 assists as the North Stars (who won just four of their first 23 games) caught fire late in the season to narrowly make the Stanley Cup playoffs. Bellows had two goals in the decisive Game 6 against the Presidents' Trophy winning Chicago Blackhawks to help Minnesota eliminate Chicago, becoming the first team to upset the regular season champion in the first round of the Stanley Cup playoffs in 20 years. The North Stars subsequently beat the defending Cup champion Edmonton Oilers in five games to reach the Final for the first time since 1981. Bellows had 29 points on 10 goals and 19 assists, with his assists setting a franchise record and his points tying the franchise record set by Steve Payne ten years earlier (the points record still stands, while Bellows was passed by Miro Heiskanen in assists in the 2020 postseason). The North Stars won two of the first three games of the Stanley Cup Final before the Penguins won three in a row to win the series in six games.

In the 1992 offseason, Bellows, who had been reported to spar with coaches trying to make him a more well-rounded player, met the end of the line in Minnesota. On August 31, 1992, in Bob Gainey's first move in the dual role of coach-general manager of the North Stars, Bellows was traded to the Montreal Canadiens for Russ Courtnall. Gainey credited Bellows and his play in offense while also stating that the team record (one winning season in the last eight years) did not reflect well on him. While he was described by one media outlet as having failed to "live up to his billing", he departed the North Stars as the all-time goals scorer (342) and was the co-leader alongside Dino Ciccarelli in seven 30-goal seasons; he was later surpassed in both categories by Mike Modano. In the 1992–93 season, his 88 points were the second highest season total of his career. He had 15 playoff points while suffering a rib injury in the first round. When the Canadiens reached the Stanley Cup Final, he elected to delay his planned June wedding. He was benched in Game 2 but rebounded with a goal in Game 3 as the Canadiens won the Final over the Los Angeles Kings in five games.

As his career was winding down, Bellows played for the Tampa Bay Lightning, Mighty Ducks of Anaheim and the Washington Capitals. Bellows spent time playing part-time in Berlin in 1997 and 1998 while planning to finish his business degree (he had studied at University of St. Thomas on-and-off since 1983) and planning to take a vacation to Arizona in late March. However, Washington called and he soon agreed to a contract with the team. In his first game on March 28 against Vancouver, he had a two-goal night and wound up having six goals and three assists in eleven games. In the 1998 Stanley Cup playoffs, it was Bellows who scored the first goal for Washington in the eventual run to the Stanley Cup Final for the first time in franchise history. Bellows scored the series-clinching overtime goal Game 6 of the first round series against the Boston Bruins and in Game 6 of the Conference Finals against the Buffalo Sabres, he set up the series-winning goal by Joe Juneau with an assist alongside Adam Oates. He had 13 points in 21 games, which included leading the team in goals scored in the Stanley Cup Final with two; the Capitals lost in the Final to the Detroit Red Wings in four games. The 1998–99 season was the final one for Bellows as a player. On January 2, 1999, Bellows scored his 1,000th career regular season point on an assist versus the Toronto Maple Leafs; he recorded it in his 1,147th game as a player and he was the 54th NHL player to reach that plateau. He had 17 goals and 19 assists for the season. With the Capitals missing the playoffs, Bellows played in his final game on April 18 on the road against the Buffalo Sabres.

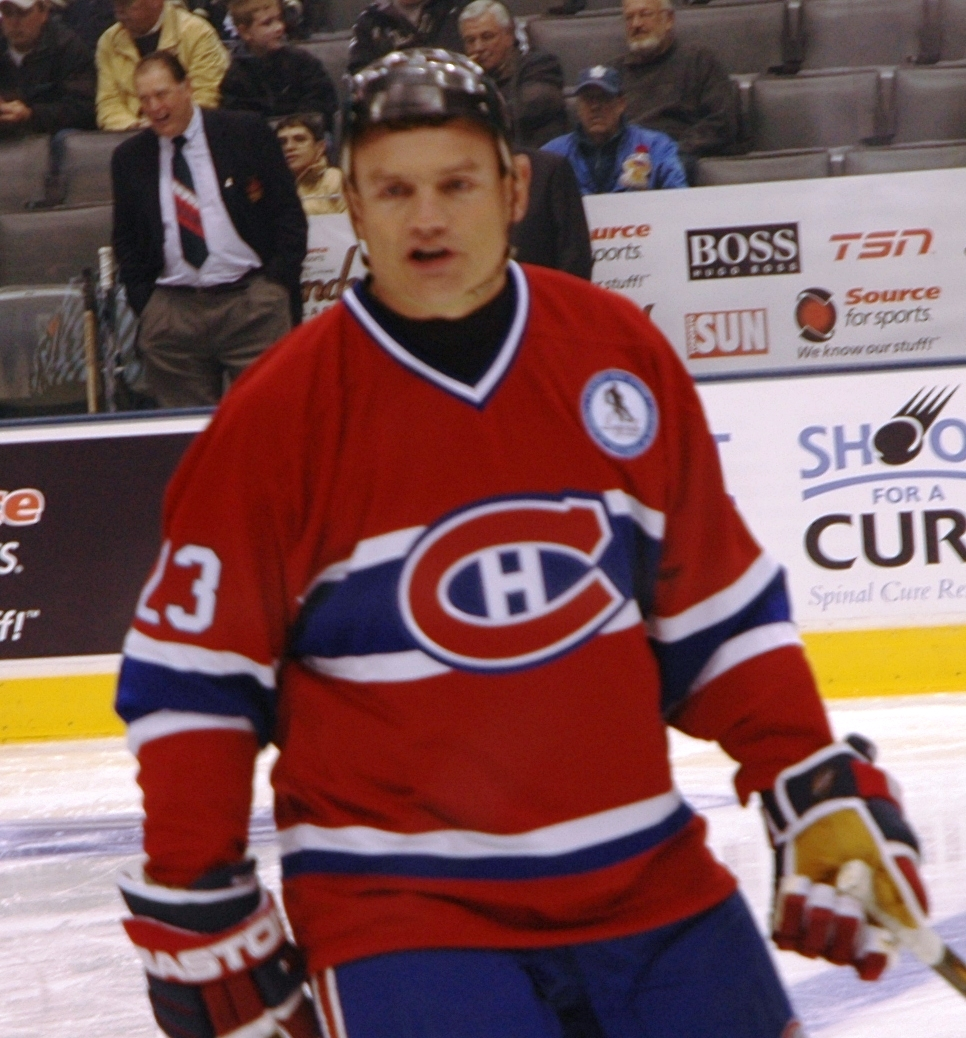
Bellows in 2008

Bellows played in the NHL All-Star Game three times (1984, 1988 and 1992). He retired with 485 goals, 537 assists and 1,022 points. In his career span from 1982 to 1999, Bellows was one of 25 players with 1,000 points. His plus-minus of -120 was sixth worst for all players in that timespan and ranks as the second lowest plus-minus for all players with 1,000 points next to Bernie Federko. He was 11th in goals scored during that span. From players in his 1982 draft class, Bellows ranked 5th in points and 2nd in goals.

== Personal life ==
After his playing career ended, Bellows and his family settled in Edina, Minnesota. He currently works in Minneapolis as a broker at investment bank Piper Sandler.

Bellows saw the birth of his second child Kieffer the day after Game 1 of the 1998 Stanley Cup Final. In 2016, Bellows saw his son Kieffer get drafted in the first round as the 19th overall pick by the New York Islanders.

== Awards and achievements ==
- Memorial Cup champion – 1982
- Stanley Cup champion – 1993
- NHL All-Star Game – 1984, 1988, 1992
- Ice Hockey World Championships scoring leader – 1989
- NHL second All-Star team – 1990
- Kitchener Rangers Level of Legacy – 2026

== Career statistics ==
=== Regular season and playoffs ===
			Regular season					Playoffs
Season	Team	League	GP	G	A	Pts	PIM	GP	G	A	Pts	PIM
1979–80	St. Catharines Falcons	GHJHL	44	50	80	130	26	—	—	—	—	—
1980–81	Kitchener Rangers	OMJHL	66	49	67	116	23	16	14	13	27	13
1980–81	Kitchener Rangers	M-Cup	—	—	—	—	—	5	6	0	6	4
1981–82	Kitchener Rangers	OHL	47	45	52	97	23	15	16	13	29	11
1981–82	Kitchener Rangers	M-Cup	—	—	—	—	—	5	6	6	12	4
1982–83	Minnesota North Stars	NHL	78	35	30	65	27	9	5	4	9	18
1983–84	Minnesota North Stars	NHL	78	41	42	83	66	16	2	12	14	6
1984–85	Minnesota North Stars	NHL	78	26	36	62	72	9	2	4	6	9
1985–86	Minnesota North Stars	NHL	77	31	48	79	46	5	5	0	5	16
1986–87	Minnesota North Stars	NHL	65	26	27	53	34	—	—	—	—	—
1987–88	Minnesota North Stars	NHL	77	40	41	81	81	—	—	—	—	—
1988–89	Minnesota North Stars	NHL	60	23	27	50	55	5	2	3	5	8
1989–90	Minnesota North Stars	NHL	80	55	44	99	72	7	4	3	7	10
1990–91	Minnesota North Stars	NHL	80	35	40	75	43	23	10	19	29	30
1991–92	Minnesota North Stars	NHL	80	30	45	75	41	7	4	4	8	14
1992–93	Montreal Canadiens	NHL	82	40	48	88	44	18	6	9	15	18
1993–94	Montreal Canadiens	NHL	77	33	38	71	36	6	1	2	3	2
1994–95	Montreal Canadiens	NHL	41	8	8	16	8	—	—	—	—	—
1995–96	Tampa Bay Lightning	NHL	79	23	26	49	39	6	2	0	2	4
1996–97	Tampa Bay Lightning	NHL	7	1	2	3	0	—	—	—	—	—
1996–97	Mighty Ducks of Anaheim	NHL	62	15	13	28	22	11	2	4	6	2
1997–98	Washington Capitals	NHL	11	6	3	9	6	21	6	7	13	6
1997–98	Berlin Capitals	DEL	29	19	17	36	18	4	0	2	2	0
1998–99	Washington Capitals	NHL	76	17	19	36	26	—	—	—	—	—
NHL totals			1,188	485	537	1,022	718	143	51	71	122	143

=== International ===
Year	Team	Event	GP	G	A	Pts	PIM
1984	Canada	CC	5	0	1	1	0
1987	Canada	WC	10	1	3	4	8
1989	Canada	WC	10	8	6	14	2
1990	Canada	WC	8	3	6	9	8
Senior totals			33	12	16	28	18

== See also ==
- List of NHL players with 1,000 points
- List of NHL players with 1,000 games played

Preceded by Ron Meighan	Minnesota North Stars first-round draft pick 1982	Succeeded by Brian Lawton
Preceded by Craig Hartsburg	Minnesota North Stars captain 1984	Succeeded by Craig Hartsburg
