= Mike Moher =

Canadian ice hockey player

- Born: March 26, 1962 (age 64) Manitouwadge, Ontario, Canada
- Height: 5 ft 10 in (178 cm)
- Weight: 180 lb (82 kg; 12 st 12 lb)
- Position: Right wing
- Shot: Right
- Played for: New Jersey Devils
- NHL draft: 106th overall, 1982; New Jersey Devils
- Playing career: 1982–1984

Mike Moher (born March 26, 1962) is a Canadian former professional ice hockey right winger. He played junior hockey for the Kitchener Rangers with whom he won the Memorial Cup in 1982. He also won a gold medal with the Canadian junior team at the 1982 World Junior Ice Hockey Championships. Selected 106th overall by the New Jersey Devils in the 1982 NHL entry draft, Moher made his NHL debut February 27, 1983, and played nine games with the team in 1982–83, recording one assist. He spent the rest of the season with the Wichita Wind, and played one more season with the Maine Mariners before retiring in 1984 at the age of 22.

== Career statistics ==
=== Regular season and playoffs ===
			Regular season					Playoffs
Season	Team	League	GP	G	A	Pts	PIM	GP	G	A	Pts	PIM
1977–78	Schreiber North Stars	NOJHA	20	35	30	65	121	—	—	—	—	—
1978–79	Garson Native Sons	NOJHA	40	28	35	63	248	—	—	—	—	—
1979–80	Sudbury Wolves	OMJHL	23	2	5	7	87	—	—	—	—	—
1979–80	Kitchener Rangers	OMJHL	45	11	21	32	271	—	—	—	—	—
1980–81	Kitchener Rangers	OHL	51	8	14	22	372	18	3	3	6	112
1980–81	Kitchener Rangers	M-Cup	—	—	—	—	—	5	2	4	6	22
1981–82	Kitchener Rangers	OHL	43	13	14	27	384	13	1	4	5	120
1981–82	Kitchener Rangers	M-Cup	—	—	—	—	—	5	1	1	2	35
1982–83	Wichita Wind	CHL	48	19	7	26	238	—	—	—	—	—
1982–83	New Jersey Devils	NHL	9	0	1	1	28	—	—	—	—	—
1983–84	Maine Mariners	AHL	25	5	6	11	119	—	—	—	—	—
NHL totals			9	0	1	1	28	—	—	—	—	—
