= Tom Cassidy =

Canadian ice hockey player

- Born: March 15, 1952 (age 73) Blind River, Ontario, Canada
- Height: 5 ft 11 in (180 cm)
- Weight: 180 lb (82 kg; 12 st 12 lb)
- Position: Centre
- Shot: Left
- Played for: Pittsburgh Penguins
- NHL draft: 22nd overall, 1972; California Golden Seals
- Playing career: 1972–1979

Tom Cassidy (born March 15, 1952) is a Canadian former professional ice hockey centre who briefly played in the National Hockey League for the Pittsburgh Penguins.

== Career statistics ==
			Regular Season					Playoffs
Season	Team	League	GP	G	A	Pts	PIM	GP	G	A	Pts	PIM
1969–70	Kitchener Rangers	OHA	24	5	2	7	14	6	0	1	1	4
1970–71	Kitchener Rangers	OHA	62	42	62	104	94	4	4	1	5	4
1971–72	Kitchener Rangers	OHA	55	32	44	76	109	3	0	2	2	9
1972–73	Baltimore Clippers	AHL	73	21	32	53	86	—	—	—	—	—
1973–74	Springfield Kings	AHL	15	3	8	11	14	—	—	—	—	—
1973–74	Salt Lake Golden Eagles	WHL	31	12	11	23	4	—	—	—	—	—
1974–75	Springfield Kings	AHL	72	32	59	91	201	17	4	11	15	8
1975–76	Oklahoma City Blazers	CHL	76	35	50	85	124	4	1	2	3	4
1976–77	Columbus Owls	IHL	75	47	61	108	172	7	1	5	6	2
1977–78	Pittsburgh Penguins	NHL	26	3	4	7	15	—	—	—	—	—
1977–78	Binghamton Dusters	AHL	40	7	7	14	19	—	—	—	—	—
1978–79	Rochester Americans	AHL	51	11	35	46	55	—	—	—	—	—
1978–79	Oklahoma City Stars	CHL	19	2	5	7	23	—	—	—	—	—
NHL totals			26	3	4	7	15	—	—	—	—	—
