= Evan McEneny =

Canadian ice hockey player

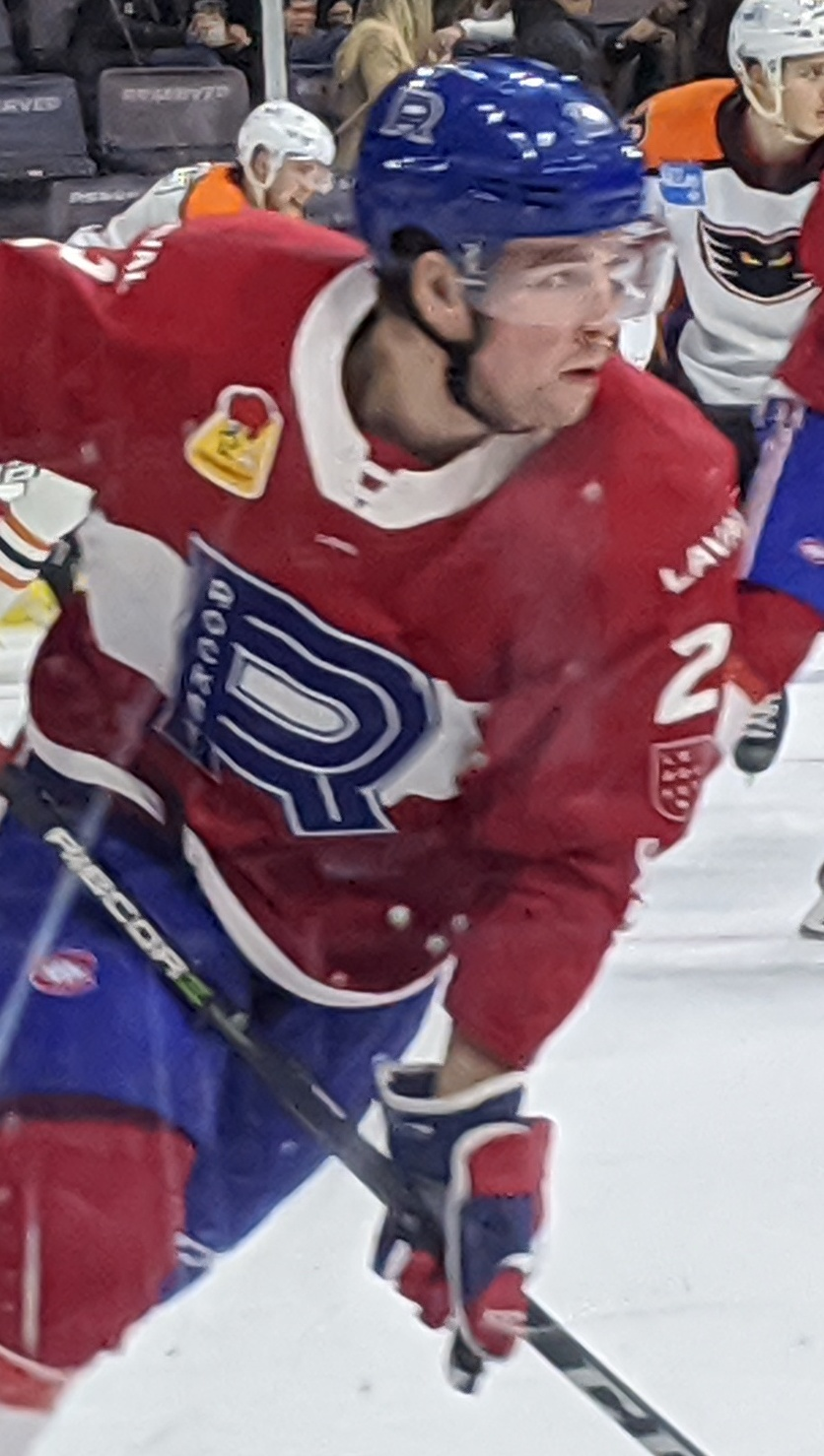
- McEneny with the Laval Rocket in 2020
- Born: May 22, 1994 (age 32) Grimsby, Ontario, Canada
- Height: 6 ft 2 in (188 cm)
- Weight: 215 lb (98 kg; 15 st 5 lb)
- Position: Defence
- Shot: Left
- Played for: Vancouver Canucks
- NHL draft: Undrafted
- Playing career: 2014–2020

Evan McEneny (born May 22, 1994) is a Canadian former professional ice hockey defenceman. He most recently played for the Laval Rocket in the American Hockey League (AHL). Undrafted, he formerly played with the Vancouver Canucks of the National Hockey League (NHL).

== Playing career ==
McEneny went undrafted in the 2012 NHL entry draft after playing only two games for the Kitchener Rangers of the Ontario Hockey League due to a torn ACL suffered in the second game of the season which caused him to miss the remaining games. He later signed with the Vancouver Canucks on September 13, 2012, as an undrafted free agent. On November 20, 2013, McEneny was traded by the Rangers to the Kingston Frontenacs in exchange for Dylan Di Perna.

McEneny spent most of the 2015–16 season, his first professional season, playing with the Kalamazoo Wings of the ECHL. The following season, he was assigned to start the season with the Utica Comets of the AHL. On February 24, 2017, McEneny was recalled to the NHL for the first time by the Canucks. He made his NHL debut the following night against the San Jose Sharks as the Canucks were defeated 4–1.

As an unsigned free agent from the Canucks, McEneny sat out the opening months of the 2019–20 season recovering from a knee injury. On completing rehabilitation, McEneny signed a professional tryout with the Laval Rocket of the AHL, an affiliate of the Montreal Canadiens, on November 21, 2019.

== Career statistics ==
			Regular season					Playoffs
Season	Team	League	GP	G	A	Pts	PIM	GP	G	A	Pts	PIM
2009–10	Burlington Cougars	OJHL	4	0	1	1	0	—	—	—	—	—
2010–11	Kitchener Rangers	OHL	44	0	4	4	14	4	0	0	0	0
2011–12	Kitchener Rangers	OHL	2	0	2	2	4	—	—	—	—	—
2012–13	Kitchener Rangers	OHL	65	6	28	34	42	10	1	3	4	14
2013–14	Kitchener Rangers	OHL	15	2	5	7	23	—	—	—	—	—
2013–14	Kingston Frontenacs	OHL	46	5	30	35	55	7	1	1	2	6
2013–14	Utica Comets	AHL	1	0	0	0	2	—	—	—	—	—
2014–15	Kingston Frontenacs	OHL	68	9	36	45	71	4	1	1	2	0
2015–16	Utica Comets	AHL	2	0	0	0	0	—	—	—	—	—
2015–16	Kalamazoo Wings	ECHL	36	1	24	25	19	5	0	1	1	6
2016–17	Utica Comets	AHL	64	8	15	23	20	—	—	—	—	—
2016–17	Vancouver Canucks	NHL	1	0	0	0	0	—	—	—	—	—
2017–18	Utica Comets	AHL	11	2	5	7	4	—	—	—	—	—
2018–19	Utica Comets	AHL	58	8	23	31	39	—	—	—	—	—
2019–20	Laval Rocket	AHL	21	2	1	3	16	—	—	—	—	—
NHL totals			1	0	0	0	0	—	—	—	—	—

== See also ==
- List of players who played only one game in the NHL
