= Darrell May (ice hockey) =

Canadian ice hockey player (born 1962)

- Born: March 6, 1962 (age 64) Montreal, Quebec, Canada
- Height: 6 ft 0 in (183 cm)
- Weight: 175 lb (79 kg; 12 st 7 lb)
- Position: Goaltender
- Caught: Left
- Played for: St. Louis Blues
- NHL draft: 91st overall, 1980; Vancouver Canucks
- Playing career: 1982–1989

Darrell Gerald May (born March 6, 1962) is a Canadian former professional ice hockey player. He played 6 games in the National Hockey League (NHL) with the St. Louis Blues during the 1985–86 and 1987–88 seasons.

== Early life ==
He was born in Montreal, Quebec. As a youth, he played in the 1974 and 1975 Quebec International Pee-Wee Hockey Tournaments with a minor ice hockey team from Pointe-Claire. He moved to St. Albert, Alberta after the age of 13, and also resided there after retirement.

== Career ==
May played six games in the National Hockey League with the St. Louis Blues. He was selected by the Vancouver Canucks in the fifth round (91st overall) of the 1980 NHL entry draft. Most of his playing career was with the Peoria Rivermen of the IHL.

== Career statistics ==
=== Regular season and playoffs ===
			Regular season									Playoffs
Season	Team	League	GP	W	L	T	MIN	GA	SO	GAA	SV%	GP	W	L	MIN	GA	SO	GAA	SV%
1978–79	Portland Winter Hawks	WHL	21	12	2	2	1113	64	0	3.45	.887	2	1	0	80	7	0	5.25	.837
1979–80	Portland Winter Hawks	WHL	43	32	8	1	2416	143	1	3.55	904	8	3	5	439	27	0	3.69	.892
1980–81	Portland Winter Hawks	WHL	36	28	7	1	2128	122	3	3.44	.898	4	—	—	243	21	0	5.19	.869
1981–82	Portland Winter Hawks	WHL	53	31	20	2	3097	226	0	4.38	.890	15	—	—	851	59	0	4.16	.881
1981–82	Portland Winter Hawks	M-Cup	—	—	—	—	—	—	—	—	—	2	1	0	77	7	0	5.45	.879
1982–83	Fort Wayne Komets	IHL	46	—	—	—	2584	177	0	4.11	—	2	—	—	120	13	0	6.50	—
1983–84	Erie Golden Blades	ACHL	43	21	16	2	2404	163	1	4.07	—	7	—	—	461	16	1	2.08	—
1984–85	Erie Golden Blades	ACHL	43	—	—	—	2580	170	1	3.95	—	—	—	—	—	—	—	—	—
1984–85	Peoria Rivermen	IHL	19	13	4	2	1133	56	1	2.97	—	10	6	4	609	33	0	3.25	—
1985–86	St. Louis Blues	NHL	3	1	2	0	184	13	0	4.26	.849	—	—	—	—	—	—	—	—
1985–86	Peoria Rivermen	IHL	56	33	21	0	3321	179	1	3.23	—	11	6	5	634	38	1	3.60	—
1986–87	Peoria Rivermen	IHL	56	26	31	1	3420	214	2	3.75	—	—	—	—	—	—	—	—	—
1987–88	St. Louis Blues	NHL	3	0	3	0	179	18	0	6.04	.830	—	—	—	—	—	—	—	—
1987–88	Peoria Rivermen	IHL	48	22	19	5	2754	162	1	3.53	—	—	—	—	—	—	—	—	—
1988–89	Peoria Rivermen	IHL	52	20	22	0	2908	202	0	4.17	—	2	0	2	137	13	0	5.69	—
NHL totals			6	1	5	0	362	31	0	5.14	.839	—	—	—	—	—	—	—	—
