= Mike Eagles =

Canadian ice hockey player

- Eagles in 1986
- Born: March 7, 1963 (age 63) Sussex, New Brunswick, Canada
- Height: 5 ft 10 in (178 cm)
- Weight: 190 lb (86 kg; 13 st 8 lb)
- Position: Left wing
- Shot: Left
- Played for: Quebec Nordiques; Chicago Blackhawks; Winnipeg Jets; Washington Capitals
- NHL draft: 116th overall, 1981; Quebec Nordiques
- Playing career: 1983–2000

Michael Bryant Eagles (born March 7, 1963) is a Canadian former professional ice hockey forward who played sixteen seasons in the National Hockey League. He is also the former Athletic Director of St. Thomas University in Fredericton, New Brunswick.

== Pre-NHL ==
Eagles won two Ontario Hockey League championships (1981 and 1982) and the Memorial Cup (1982) with the Kitchener Rangers.

== NHL career ==
Eagles was drafted 116th overall by the Quebec Nordiques in the 1981 NHL entry draft. He played 853 career NHL games, scoring 74 goals and 122 assists for 196 points. Throughout his career, Eagles played for the Quebec Nordiques (1982–1988), the Chicago Blackhawks (1988–1990), the Winnipeg Jets (1990–1994), and the Washington Capitals (1994–2000). During his time with the Capitals, he played in the 1998 Stanley Cup Finals against the Detroit Red Wings.

== Post NHL ==
In 2002, he was named head coach of the St. Thomas University Tommies of the Canadian Interuniversity Sport conference. During his first year, he led the Tommies to a league championship, and was also named CIS coach of the year. In 2011, he left his coaching position to become St Thomas's Athletic Director.

== International play ==
Medal record

Representing Canada

Ice hockey

World Junior Championships
Bronze medal – third place	1983 Soviet Union	

Eagles made an international debut for Team Canada at the 1983 World Junior Ice Hockey Championships in the Soviet Union. As a member of the team, he won a bronze medal.

== Career statistics ==
=== Regular season and playoffs ===
			Regular season					Playoffs
Season	Team	League	GP	G	A	Pts	PIM	GP	G	A	Pts	PIM
1979–80	Melville Millionaires	SJHL	55	46	30	76	77	—	—	—	—	—
1979–80	Billings Bighorns	WHL	5	0	1	1	0	4	0	0	0	7
1980–81	Kitchener Rangers	OHL	56	11	27	38	64	18	4	2	6	36
1980–81	Kitchener Rangers	MC	—	—	—	—	—	5	1	1	2	4
1981–82	Kitchener Rangers	OHL	62	26	40	66	148	15	3	11	14	27
1981–82	Kitchener Rangers	MC	—	—	—	—	—	5	3	3	6	0
1982–83	Kitchener Rangers	OHL	58	26	36	62	133	12	5	7	12	27
1982–83	Quebec Nordiques	NHL	2	0	0	0	2	—	—	—	—	—
1983–84	Fredericton Express	AHL	68	13	29	42	85	4	0	0	0	5
1984–85	Fredericton Express	AHL	36	4	20	24	80	3	0	0	0	2
1985–86	Quebec Nordiques	NHL	73	11	12	23	49	3	0	0	0	2
1986–87	Quebec Nordiques	NHL	73	13	19	32	55	4	1	0	1	10
1987–88	Quebec Nordiques	NHL	76	10	10	20	74	—	—	—	—	—
1988–89	Chicago Blackhawks	NHL	47	5	11	16	44	—	—	—	—	—
1989–90	Chicago Blackhawks	NHL	23	1	2	3	34	—	—	—	—	—
1989–90	Indianapolis Ice	IHL	24	11	13	24	47	13	10	10	20	34
1990–91	Indianapolis Ice	IHL	25	15	14	29	47	—	—	—	—	—
1990–91	Winnipeg Jets	NHL	44	0	9	9	79	—	—	—	—	—
1991–92	Winnipeg Jets	NHL	65	7	10	17	118	7	0	0	0	8
1992–93	Winnipeg Jets	NHL	84	8	18	26	131	5	0	1	1	6
1993–94	Winnipeg Jets	NHL	73	4	8	12	96	—	—	—	—	—
1994–95	Winnipeg Jets	NHL	27	2	1	3	40	—	—	—	—	—
1994–95	Washington Capitals	NHL	13	1	3	4	8	7	0	2	2	4
1995–96	Washington Capitals	NHL	70	4	7	11	75	6	1	1	2	2
1996–97	Washington Capitals	NHL	70	1	7	8	42	—	—	—	—	—
1997–98	Washington Capitals	NHL	36	1	3	4	16	12	0	2	2	2
1998–99	Washington Capitals	NHL	52	4	2	6	50	—	—	—	—	—
1999–2000	Washington Capitals	NHL	25	2	0	2	15	—	—	—	—	—
NHL totals			853	74	122	196	928	44	2	6	8	34

=== International ===
Year	Team	Event	GP	G	A	Pts	PIM
1983	Canada	WJC	7	2	4	6	2
