= John Chabot =

Canadian ice hockey player and coach

- Born: May 18, 1962 (age 64) Summerside, Prince Edward Island, Canada
- Height: 6 ft 2 in (188 cm)
- Weight: 195 lb (88 kg; 13 st 13 lb)
- Position: Centre
- Shot: Left
- Played for: Montreal Canadiens; Pittsburgh Penguins; Detroit Red Wings; HC Milan; HC Devils Milano; BSC Preussen; Berlin Capitals; EV Zug; Frankfurt Lions; Eisbären Berlin
- National team: Canada
- NHL draft: 40th overall, 1980; Montreal Canadiens
- Playing career: 1982–2001

John David Chabot (born May 18, 1962) is a Canadian former professional ice hockey player and coach. He played in the National Hockey League (NHL) from 1983 to 1991, and then played in Europe from 1991 until retiring in 2001. He later worked as a coach in the Quebec Major Junior Hockey League and spent two seasons as an assistant coach in the NHL in the 2000s.

== Playing career ==
As a youth, Chabot played in the 1975 Quebec International Pee-Wee Hockey Tournament with a minor ice hockey team from Gatineau.

Chabot was Hull's first-round pick (first overall) in the 1979 QMJHL draft, and won the QMJHL Briere Trophy (MVP) and CCM QMJHL Player of the Year in 1981–82 with Sherbrooke. He was drafted in 1980 by the Montreal Canadiens, and played 508 career National Hockey League games for the Montreal Canadiens, Pittsburgh Penguins, and Detroit Red Wings. In his rookie year for the Canadiens, he scored 18 goals and had a total of 43 points.

Chabot signed with HC Milan in 1991 and in 1992, he took his game to Germany and would play nine years in the country's top-flight league, the Deutsche Eishockey Liga. He first joined Preussen Berlin (changed name to Berlin Capitals in 1996), then had a three-year stint with the Frankfurt Lions and played for Eisbären Berlin in his last season as a professional athlete (2000–01).

== Coaching career ==
Chabot's junior coaching career includes the QMJHL's Hull Olympiques, Gatineau Olympiques and Acadie-Bathurst Titan. In his four years of coaching the Gatineau Olympiques he made two appearances in the Memorial Cup. He also spent one year as an assistant coach for the New York Islanders of the NHL.

== Personal life ==
Chabot attended high school at D'Arcy McGee in Hull, Quebec. John Frobel was one of many childhood friends. He is Algonquin from Kitigan Zibi, and is active in visiting reserves to speak and run hockey skills camps across Canada. When he was visiting students in the Matawa Learning Center, he told students that hockey kept him out of trouble as a young boy. He also stated that "It's a place to go with your friends that is healthy and it gives the opportunity to feel better about yourself and if you feel better about yourself you make better choices". Chabot is also the president of Anishinabeg Communications, a company that specializes in promotional items, printing, graphic design, and brand development.

== Career statistics ==
=== Regular season and playoffs ===
			Regular season					Playoffs
Season	Team	League	GP	G	A	Pts	PIM	GP	G	A	Pts	PIM
1978–79	Gatineau L'Intrépide	QMAAA	—	—	—	—	—	—	—	—	—	—
1979–80	Hull Olympiques	QMJHL	68	26	57	83	28	4	1	2	3	0
1980–81	Hull Olympiques	QMJHL	70	27	62	89	24	—	—	—	—	—
1980–81	Nova Scotia Voyageurs	AHL	1	0	0	0	0	2	0	0	0	0
1981–82	Sherbrooke Castors	QMJHL	62	34	109	143	40	19	6	26	32	6
1981–82	Sherbrooke Castors	M-Cup	—	—	—	—	—	5	3	8	11	0
1982–83	Nova Scotia Voyageurs	AHL	76	16	73	89	19	7	1	3	4	0
1983–84	Montreal Canadiens	NHL	56	18	25	43	13	11	1	4	5	0
1984–85	Montreal Canadiens	NHL	10	1	6	7	2	—	—	—	—	—
1984–85	Pittsburgh Penguins	NHL	67	8	45	53	12	—	—	—	—	—
1985–86	Pittsburgh Penguins	NHL	77	14	31	45	6	—	—	—	—	—
1986–87	Pittsburgh Penguins	NHL	72	14	22	36	8	—	—	—	—	—
1987–88	Detroit Red Wings	NHL	78	13	44	57	10	16	4	15	19	2
1988–89	Adirondack Red Wings	AHL	8	3	12	15	0	—	—	—	—	—
1988–89	Detroit Red Wings	NHL	52	2	10	12	6	6	1	1	2	0
1989–90	Detroit Red Wings	NHL	69	9	40	49	24	—	—	—	—	—
1990–91	Adirondack Red Wings	AHL	27	11	30	41	4	2	0	1	1	0
1990–91	Detroit Red Wings	NHL	27	5	5	10	4	—	—	—	—	—
1991–92	HC Milano Saima	ITA	18	10	36	46	4	12	3	13	16	2
1991–92	HC Milano Saima	ALP	20	12	22	34	12	—	—	—	—	—
1991–92	Canadian National Team	Intl	8	1	3	4	0	—	—	—	—	—
1992–93	HC Milano Saima	ALP	13	6	17	23	0	—	—	—	—	—
1992–93	BSC Preussen	GER	20	10	17	27	14	7	1	7	8	4
1993–94	BSC Preussen	GER	32	9	29	38	27	10	5	6	11	8
1994–95	Canada	Intl	3	1	2	3	0	—	—	—	—	—
1994–95	BSC Preussen	DEL	43	20	48	68	48	12	5	7	12	14
1995–96	BSC Preussen	DEL	50	16	65	81	20	11	5	14	19	14
1996–97	Berlin Capitals	DEL	45	12	34	46	43	4	2	1	3	0
1996–97	EV Zug	NDA	—	—	—	—	—	1	0	1	1	0
1997–98	Frankfurt Lions	DEL	47	12	46	58	72	7	0	5	5	2
1998–99	Frankfurt Lions	DEL	49	7	52	59	44	8	1	4	5	2
1999–00	Frankfurt Lions	DEL	38	10	33	43	16	5	1	3	4	10
2000–01	Eisbären Berlin	DEL	47	11	24	35	37	—	—	—	—	—
NHL totals			508	84	228	312	85	33	6	20	26	2
