= Wendell Young =

Canadian ice hockey player and general manager

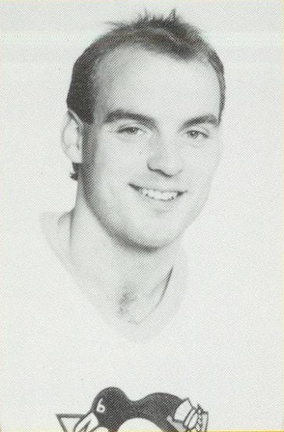
- Born: August 1, 1963 (age 62) Halifax, Nova Scotia, Canada
- Height: 5 ft 9 in (175 cm)
- Weight: 181 lb (82 kg; 12 st 13 lb)
- Position: Goaltender
- Caught: Left
- Played for: Vancouver Canucks; Philadelphia Flyers; Pittsburgh Penguins; Tampa Bay Lightning
- NHL draft: 73rd overall, 1981; Vancouver Canucks
- Playing career: 1983–2001

Wendell Edward Young (born August 1, 1963) is a Canadian former professional ice hockey goaltender. He is currently serving as the vice chairman/governor of the Chicago Wolves of the American Hockey League. Wendell was the only player in hockey history to have won all four cups: the Memorial Cup, Calder Cup, Turner Cup and Stanley Cup. His Chicago Wolves Jersey #1 was retired in a ceremony at their home rink, The Allstate Arena, (Rosemont, IL) on December 1, 2001. This marked the first time the Chicago Wolves had retired a number since their inception into the then-titled IHL (International Hockey League) in 1994.

== Early life ==
Young was born on August 1, 1963, in Halifax, Nova Scotia, Canada to parents Helen and Doug. Young was their second youngest child between three brothers and a sister. His older brother Darrell was also involved in ice hockey; he served as a coach in the Atlantic University Athletic Association Hockey League.

== Playing career ==
=== Amateur ===
While growing up in Nova Scotia, Young played in the Halifax Major Midget Hockey League for the Cole Harbour Colts. Following his 1979–80 season with the Colts, Young was drafted in the sixth round, 66th overall, by the Kitchener Rangers in the Ontario Hockey League (OHL) Priority Selection.

=== Professional ===
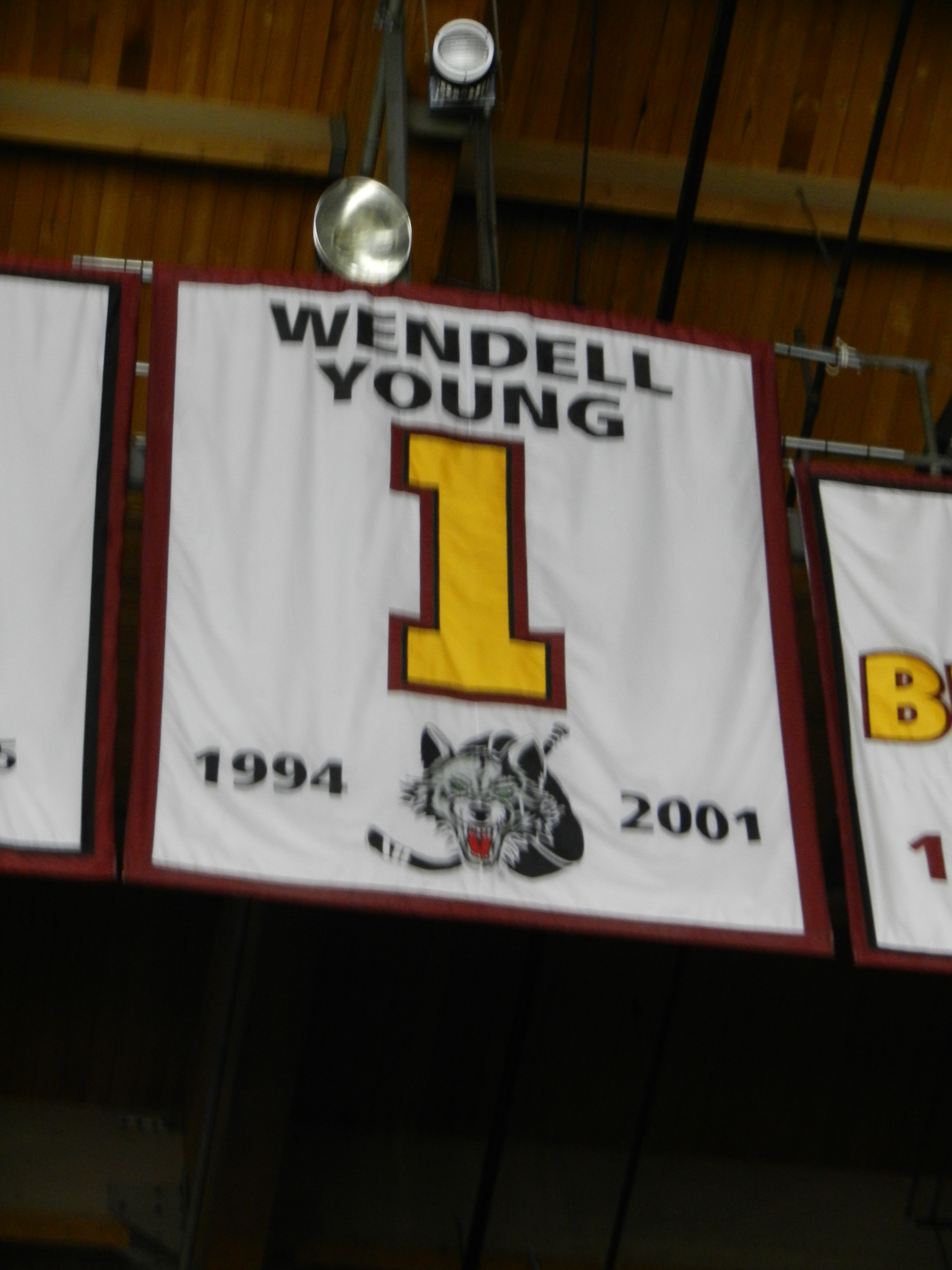
Young's retired number banner for the Chicago Wolves

Young played for the Vancouver Canucks, Philadelphia Flyers, Pittsburgh Penguins and Tampa Bay Lightning in the National Hockey League. Young is the only hockey player to have won a Memorial Cup (in 1982 with the Kitchener Rangers), a Calder Cup (with the 1988 Hershey Bears and as a manager with the 2022 Chicago Wolves), a Turner Cup (with the 1998 and 2000 Chicago Wolves), and a Stanley Cup (with the 1991 and 1992 Penguins). He also has 2 Robertson Cups with the Kitchener Rangers as Ontario Hockey League Champions in 1981 and 1982.

== Career statistics ==
=== Regular season and playoffs ===
			Regular season									Playoffs
Season	Team	League	GP	W	L	T	MIN	GA	SO	GAA	SV%	GP	W	L	MIN	GA	SO	GAA	SV%
1980–81	Kitchener Rangers	OHL	42	19	15	0	2215	164	1	4.44	—	4	2	2	189	14	0	4.44	—
1981–82	Kitchener Rangers	OHL	60	38	17	2	3470	195	1	3.37	—	5	2	2	243	18	0	4.44	—
1982–83	Kitchener Rangers	OHL	61	41	19	0	3611	231	1	3.84	—	12	6	5	720	43	0	3.58	—
1983–84	Salt Lake Golden Eagles	CHL	20	11	6	0	1094	80	0	4.39	—	4	0	2	122	11	0	5.42	—
1983–84	Fredericton Express	AHL	11	7	3	0	569	39	1	4.11	—	—	—	—	—	—	—	—	—
1983–84	Milwaukee Admirals	IHL	6	4	1	1	339	17	0	3.01	—	—	—	—	—	—	—	—	—
1984–85	Fredericton Express	AHL	22	7	11	3	1242	83	0	4.01	—	—	—	—	—	—	—	—	—
1985–86	Fredericton Express	AHL	24	12	8	4	1457	78	0	3.21	—	—	—	—	—	—	—	—	—
1985–86	Vancouver Canucks	NHL	22	4	9	3	1023	61	0	3.58	.886	1	0	1	60	5	0	5.00	.844
1986–87	Fredericton Express	AHL	30	11	16	0	1676	118	0	4.22	—	—	—	—	—	—	—	—	—
1986–87	Vancouver Canucks	NHL	8	1	6	1	420	35	0	5.00	.844	—	—	—	—	—	—	—	—
1987–88	Hershey Bears	AHL	51	33	15	1	2922	135	1	2.77	—	12	12	0	767	28	1	2.19	—
1987–88	Philadelphia Flyers	NHL	6	3	2	0	320	20	0	3.76	.865	—	—	—	—	—	—	—	—
1988–89	Muskegon Lumberjacks	IHL	2	1	0	1	125	7	0	3.36	—	—	—	—	—	—	—	—	—
1988–89	Pittsburgh Penguins	NHL	22	12	9	0	1151	92	0	4.80	.863	1	0	0	39	1	0	1.55	.909
1989–90	Pittsburgh Penguins	NHL	43	16	20	4	2319	161	1	4.17	.873	—	—	—	—	—	—	—	—
1990–91	Pittsburgh Penguins	NHL	18	4	6	2	773	52	0	4.04	.879	—	—	—	—	—	—	—	—
1991–92	Pittsburgh Penguins	NHL	18	7	6	0	838	53	0	3.80	.889	—	—	—	—	—	—	—	—
1992–93	Atlanta Knights	IHL	3	3	0	0	183	8	0	2.62	—	—	—	—	—	—	—	—	—
1992–93	Tampa Bay Lightning	NHL	31	7	19	2	1592	97	0	3.66	.872	—	—	—	—	—	—	—	—
1993–94	Atlanta Knights	IHL	2	2	0	0	120	6	0	3.00	—	—	—	—	—	—	—	—	—
1993–94	Tampa Bay Lightning	NHL	9	2	3	1	480	20	1	2.50	.905	—	—	—	—	—	—	—	—
1994–95	Chicago Wolves	IHL	37	14	11	7	1882	112	0	3.57	.894	—	—	—	—	—	—	—	—
1994–95	Pittsburgh Penguins	NHL	10	3	6	0	497	27	0	3.26	.894	—	—	—	—	—	—	—	—
1995–96	Chicago Wolves	IHL	61	30	20	6	3285	199	1	3.63	.899	9	4	5	540	30	0	3.33	—
1996–97	Chicago Wolves	IHL	52	25	21	4	2931	170	1	3.48	.894	4	1	3	256	13	0	3.04	—
1997–98	Chicago Wolves	IHL	51	31	14	3	2912	149	2	3.07	.896	9	5	3	515	24	1	2.79	—
1998–99	Chicago Wolves	IHL	35	20	10	4	2047	149	3	2.46	.914	7	4	3	256	19	1	2.71	.905
1999–00	Chicago Wolves	IHL	48	32	12	4	2781	128	6	2.76	.901	9	5	3	488	27	1	3.32	.866
2000–01	Chicago Wolves	IHL	38	17	16	3	2074	109	3	3.15	.899	7	2	4	373	21	0	3.38	.884
NHL totals			187	59	86	12	9410	618	2	3.94	.876	2	0	1	99	6	0	3.65	.860

Awards and achievements
Preceded by Mark Laforest	Aldege "Baz" Bastien Memorial Award; 1987–88	Succeeded by Randy Exelby
