= Grant Martin =

Canadian retired ice hockey player (born 1962)

- Born: March 13, 1962 (age 63); Smooth Rock Falls, Ontario, CAN
- Height: 5 ft 10 in (178 cm)
- Weight: 179 lb (81 kg; 12 st 11 lb)
- Position: Center
- Shot: Left
- Played for: Vancouver Canucks; Washington Capitals
- National team: Canada
- NHL draft: 196th overall, 1980; Vancouver Canucks
- Playing career: 1982–1998

Grant Michael Martin (born March 13, 1962, in Smooth Rock Falls, Ontario) is a Canadian retired ice hockey player. Drafted in 1980 by the Vancouver Canucks, Martin also played for the Washington Capitals.

== Career statistics ==
| | | | Regular season | | | | | Playoffs |
| Season | Team | League | GP | G | A | Pts | PIM | GP | G | A | Pts | PIM |
|---|---|---|---|---|---|---|---|---|---|---|---|---|
| 1977–78 | Hespeler Shamrocks | OHA-B | 40 | 18 | 25 | 43 | 32 | — | — | — | — | — |
| 1978–79 | Guelph Platers | OPJHL | 49 | 21 | 29 | 50 | 70 | — | — | — | — | — |
| 1979–80 | Kitchener Rangers | OMJHL | 65 | 31 | 21 | 52 | 62 | — | — | — | — | — |
| 1980–81 | Kitchener Rangers | OHL | 66 | 41 | 57 | 98 | 77 | 18 | 9 | 20 | 29 | 42 |
| 1981–82 | Kitchener Rangers | OHL | 54 | 33 | 63 | 96 | 97 | 12 | 3 | 15 | 18 | 33 |
| 1982–83 | Fredericton Express | AHL | 80 | 19 | 27 | 46 | 73 | 12 | 4 | 1 | 5 | 14 |
| 1983–84 | Fredericton Express | AHL | 57 | 36 | 24 | 60 | 46 | 7 | 4 | 5 | 9 | 16 |
| 1983–84 | Vancouver Canucks | NHL | 12 | 0 | 2 | 2 | 6 | — | — | — | — | — |
| 1984–85 | Fredericton Express | AHL | 65 | 31 | 47 | 78 | 78 | 6 | 1 | 4 | 5 | 8 |
| 1984–85 | Vancouver Canucks | NHL | 12 | 0 | 1 | 1 | 39 | — | — | — | — | — |
| 1985–86 | Binghamton Whalers | AHL | 54 | 27 | 49 | 76 | 97 | 6 | 1 | 3 | 4 | 14 |
| 1985–86 | Washington Capitals | NHL | 11 | 0 | 1 | 1 | 6 | — | — | — | — | — |
| 1986–87 | Binghamton Whalers | AHL | 63 | 30 | 23 | 53 | 86 | 12 | 3 | 1 | 4 | 16 |
| 1986–87 | Washington Capitals | NHL | 9 | 0 | 0 | 0 | 4 | 1 | 1 | 0 | 1 | 2 |
| 1987–88 | Villacher SV | Austria | 34 | 29 | 31 | 60 | 40 | — | — | — | — | — |
| 1987–88 | Rochester Americans | AHL | 22 | 11 | 15 | 26 | 18 | 7 | 4 | 5 | 9 | 17 |
| 1988–89 | Rochester Americans | AHL | 6 | 7 | 5 | 12 | 6 | — | — | — | — | — |
| 1988–89 | JyP HT | Liiga | 43 | 20 | 29 | 49 | 48 | 11 | 1 | 5 | 6 | 11 |
| 1989–90 | Schwenninger ERC | Germany | 31 | 16 | 19 | 35 | 63 | 10 | 11 | 10 | 21 | 4 |
| 1990–91 | Schwenninger ERC | Germany | 40 | 30 | 28 | 58 | 71 | 4 | 3 | 5 | 8 | 22 |
| 1990–91 | Villacher SV | Austria | 1 | 1 | 1 | 2 | 0 | — | — | — | — | — |
| 1991–92 | Schwenninger ERC | Germany | 43 | 26 | 35 | 61 | 32 | 3 | 0 | 0 | 0 | 6 |
| 1992–93 | Schwenninger ERC | Germany | 41 | 21 | 30 | 51 | 52 | — | — | — | — | — |
| 1993–94 | Schwenninger ERC | Germany | 41 | 14 | 26 | 40 | 52 | 9 | 2 | 6 | 8 | 24 |
| 1994–95 | SERC Wild Wings | DEL | — | — | — | — | — | 1 | 0 | 0 | 0 | 0 |
| 1995–96 | SERC Wild Wings | DEL | 48 | 19 | 19 | 38 | 91 | 4 | 2 | 0 | 2 | 8 |
| 1996–97 | SERC Wild Wings | DEL | 48 | 16 | 23 | 39 | 42 | — | — | — | — | — |
| 1997–98 | SERC Wild Wings | DEL | 22 | 7 | 13 | 20 | 22 | — | — | — | — | — |
| NHL totals | | | 44 | 0 | 4 | 4 | 55 | 1 | 1 | 0 | 1 | 2 |
| AHL totals | | | 347 | 161 | 190 | 351 | 404 | 50 | 17 | 19 | 36 | 85 |
