= Brian Shaw (ice hockey, born 1962) =

Canadian ice hockey player

- Born: May 20, 1962 (age 63) Edmonton, Alberta, Canada
- Height: 6 ft 1 in (185 cm)
- Weight: 185 lb (84 kg; 13 st 3 lb)
- Position: Right wing
- Shot: Right
- Played for: AHL; Springfield Indians; Adirondack Red Wings; IHL; Peoria Prancers; Peoria Rivermen
- NHL draft: 78th overall, 1980; Chicago Blackhawks
- Playing career: 1982–1987

Brian Shaw (born May 20, 1962) is a Canadian former professional ice hockey player.

== Early life ==
Shaw was born in Edmonton. He played junior hockey with the Portland Winter Hawks, and was a member of the 1981–82 that won the President's Cup.

== Career ==
Shaw was selected by the Chicago Blackhawks in fourth round (78th overall) of the 1980 NHL entry draft. He played five seasons in the American Hockey League and International Hockey League registering a combined total of 224 points and 506 penalty minutes in 315 professional games.

== Personal life ==
Shaw is the nephew of the late coach Brian C. Shaw.

== Career statistics ==
			Regular season					Playoffs
Season	Team	League	GP	G	A	Pts	PIM	GP	G	A	Pts	PIM
1977–78	Portland Winter Hawks	WCHL	2	0	0	0	2	—	—	—	—	—
1978–79	St. Albert Saints	AJHL	53	27	36	63	199	—	—	—	—	—
1978–79	Portland Winter Hawks	WHL	4	0	1	1	0	4	0	0	0	0
1979–80	Portland Winter Hawks	WHL	68	20	25	45	161	3	1	1	2	0
1980–81	Portland Winter Hawks	WHL	72	53	65	118	176	9	3	7	10	29
1981–82	Portland Winter Hawks	WHL	69	56	76	132	193	15	18	9	27	30
1982–83	Springfield Indians	AHL	79	15	17	32	62	—	—	—	—	—
1983–84	Springfield Indians	AHL	4	2	2	4	2	—	—	—	—	—
1983–84	Peoria Prancers	IHL	54	27	27	54	49	—	—	—	—	—
1984–85	Peoria Rivermen	IHL	63	31	14	45	163	20	9	9	18	77
1985–86	Adirondack Red Wings	AHL	23	3	1	4	14	—	—	—	—	—
1985–86	Peoria Rivermen	IHL	54	41	23	64	139	10	3	4	7	32
1986–87	Peoria Rivermen	IHL	38	9	12	21	77	—	—	—	—	—
AHL totals			106	20	20	40	78	—	—	—	—	—
IHL totals			209	108	76	184	428	30	12	13	25	109
