= Memorial Cup All-Star Team =

Annual selection of the best players at the Memorial Cup tournament

- The Memorial Cup at the 2015 tournament
- Sport: Ice hockey
- Competition: Memorial Cup
- Awarded for: Best players by position at the Memorial Cup tournament

History
- First award: 1975
- Most recent: Christian Kirsch, Landon Dupont, Cameron Reid, Sam O'Reilly, Jack Pridham, Matias Vanhanen

The Memorial Cup All-Star Team is an annual selection of the best players at the Memorial Cup tournament. Six recipients are chosen for each Memorial Cup tournament: one goaltender, two defencemen, and three forwards. Players named to a Memorial Cup All-Star Team are also considered for the other four Memorial Cup tournament awards. The first All-Star team was selected in 1975.

== Teams ==
List of Memorial Cup all-star teams:

Year	Goaltender	Defencemen	Forwards
1975	Gary Carr, Toronto	Mike Kitchen, Toronto; Brad Maxwell, New Westminster	Barry Smith, New Westminster; Claude Larose, Sherbrooke; John Anderson, Toronto
1976	Maurice Barrette, Quebec	Jean Gagnon, Quebec; Barry Beck, New Westminster	Dale McCourt, Hamilton; Ric Seiling, Hamilton; Harold Phillipoff, New Westminster
1977	Pat Riggin, Ottawa	Barry Beck, New Westminster; Brad Maxwell, New Westminster	Bobby Smith, Ottawa; Jere Gillis, Sherbrooke; Mark Lofthouse, New Westminster
1978	Ken Ellacott, Peterborough	Paul MacKinnon, Peterborough; Brian Young, New Westminster	Mark Kirton, Peterborough; Normand Lefebvre, Trois-Rivières; Stan Smyl, New Westminster
1979	Bart Hunter, Brandon	Norman Rochefort, Trois-Rivières; Brad McCrimmon, Brandon	Laurie Boschman, Brandon; Ray Allison, Brandon; Tim Trimper, Peterborough
1980	Rick LaFerriere, Peterborough	Darren Veitch, Regina; Larry Murphy, Peterborough	Bill Gardner, Peterborough; Dale Hawerchuk, Cornwall; Mark Reeds, Peterborough
1981	Corrado Micalef, Cornwall	Fred Arthur, Cornwall; Joe McDonnell, Kitchener	Dale Hawerchuk, Cornwall; Marc Crawford, Cornwall; Brian Bellows, Kitchener
1982	Michel Morissette, Sherbrooke	Paul Boutillier, Sherbrooke; Gary Nylund, Portland; Al MacInnis, Kitchener	John Chabot, Sherbrooke; Jeff Larmer, Kitchener; Sean McKenna, Sherbrooke
1983	Peter Sidorkiewicz, Oshawa	Joe Cirella, Oshawa; Jerome Carrier, Verdun	Ken Yaremchuk, Portland; Randy Heath, Portland; John MacLean, Oshawa
1984	Darren Pang, Ottawa	Dave Shaw, Kitchener; Bruce Cassidy, Ottawa	Adam Creighton, Ottawa; Jim Camazzola, Kamloops; Don McLaren, Ottawa
1985	Robert Desjardins, Shawinigan	David Goertz, Prince Albert; Yves Beaudoin, Shawinigan	Dan Hodgson, Prince Albert; Tony Grenier, Prince Albert; Patrice Lefebvre, Shawinigan
1986	Steve Guenette, Guelph	Steve Chiasson, Guelph; Ron Shudra, Kamloops	Guy Rouleau, Hull; Luc Robitaille, Hull; Bob Foglietta, Portland
1987	Mark Fitzpatrick, Medicine Hat	Wayne McBean, Medicine Hat; Gord Murphy, Oshawa	Jeff Wenaas, Medicine Hat; Dale Kushner, Medicine Hat; Guy Phillips, Medicine Hat
1988	Mark Fitzpatrick, Medicine Hat	Dean Chynoweth, Medicine Hat; Darryl Shannon, Windsor	Rob DiMaio, Medicine Hat; Darrin Shannon, Windsor; Trevor Linden, Medicine Hat
1989	Mike Greenlay, Saskatoon	Dan Lambert, Swift Current; Ken Sutton, Saskatoon	Tim Tisdale, Swift Current; Neil Carnes, Laval; Sheldon Kennedy, Swift Current
1990	Mike Torchia, Kitchener	Cory Keenan, Kitchener; Paul O'Hagan, Oshawa	Eric Lindros, Oshawa; Iain Fraser, Oshawa; Steven Rice, Kitchener
1991	Félix Potvin, Chicoutimi	Patrice Brisebois, Drummondville; Brad Tiley, Sault Ste. Marie	Pat Falloon, Spokane; Ray Whitney, Spokane; Brent Thurston, Spokane
1992	Corey Hirsch, Kamloops	Scott Niedermayer, Kamloops; Drew Bannister, Sault Ste. Marie	Colin Miller, Sault Ste. Marie; Mike Mathers, Kamloops; Turner Stevenson, Seattle
1993	Kevin Hodson, Sault Ste. Marie	Michael Gaul, Laval; Drew Bannister, Sault Ste. Marie	Ralph Intranuovo, Sault Ste. Marie; Chad Penney, Sault Ste. Marie; Martin Lapointe, Laval
1994	Éric Fichaud, Chicoutimi	Aaron Keller, Kamloops; Nolan Baumgartner, Kamloops	Darcy Tucker, Kamloops; Alain Côté, Laval; Rod Stevens, Kamloops
1995	Jason Saal, Detroit	Nolan Baumgartner, Kamloops; Bryan McCabe, Brandon	Darcy Tucker, Kamloops; Sean Haggerty, Detroit; Shane Doan, Kamloops
1996	Frédéric Deschênes, Granby	Wade Redden, Brandon; Jason Doig, Granby	Xavier Delisle, Granby; Philippe Audet, Granby; Cameron Mann, Peterborough
1997	Christian Bronsard, Hull	Chris Phillips, Lethbridge; Jan Snopek, Oshawa	Christian Dubé, Hull; Byron Ritchie, Lethbridge; Martin Menard, Hull
1998	Chris Madden, Guelph	Brad Ference, Spokane; Francis Lessard, Val-d’Or	Andrej Podkonicky, Portland; Manny Malhotra, Guelph; Marian Hossa, Portland
1999	Cory Campbell, Belleville	Matt Kinch, Calgary; Nick Boynton, Ottawa	Glenn Crawford, Belleville; Joe Talbot, Ottawa; Pavel Brendl, Calgary
2000	Sébastien Caron, Rimouski	Michel Périard, Rimouski; Eric Reitz, Barrie	Brad Richards, Rimouski; Juraj Kolnik, Rimouski; Sheldon Keefe, Barrie
2001	Maxime Dagneault, Val-d’Or	Paul Elliott, Regina; Chris Lyness, Val-d’Or; Ross Lupaschuk, Red Deer	Brett Lysak, Regina; Simon Gamache, Val-d’Or; Kyle Wanvig, Red Deer
2002	T. J. Aceti, Erie	Danny Groulx, Victoriaville; Kevin Dallman, Guelph	Matthew Lombardi, Victoriaville; Colin Sinclair, Kootenay; Cory Pecker, Erie
2003	Scott Dickie, Kitchener	Doug O'Brien, Hull; Steve Eminger, Kitchener	Derek Roy, Kitchener; Gregory Campbell, Kitchener; Mike Richards, Kitchener
2004	Kelly Guard, Kelowna	Doug O'Brien, Gatineau; Shea Weber, Kelowna	Jean-Michel Daoust, Gatineau; Clarke MacArthur, Medicine Hat; Randall Gelech, Kelowna
2005	Adam Dennis, London	Danny Syvret, London; Mario Scalzo, Rimouski	Sidney Crosby, Rimouski; Dan Fritsche, London; Corey Perry, London
2006	Cédrick Desjardins, Quebec	Paul Albers, Vancouver; Michal Sersen, Quebec	Alexander Radulov, Quebec; Gilbert Brulé, Vancouver; Adam Pineault, Moncton
2007	Matt Keetley, Medicine Hat	Cody Franson, Vancouver; Brendan Mikkelson, Vancouver	Darren Helm, Medicine Hat; Michal Repik, Vancouver; Milan Lucic, Vancouver
2008	Dustin Tokarski, Spokane	Justin Falk, Spokane; Ben Shutron, Kitchener	Justin Azevedo, Kitchener; Mitch Wahl, Spokane; Drayson Bowman, Spokane
2009	Marco Cousineau, Drummondville	Ryan Ellis, Windsor; Tyler Myers, Kelowna	Taylor Hall, Windsor; Jamie Benn, Kelowna; Patrice Cormier, Rimouski
2010	Martin Jones, Calgary	Travis Hamonic, Brandon; Cam Fowler, Windsor	Taylor Hall, Windsor; Jimmy Bubnick, Calgary; Matt Calvert, Brandon
2011	Jordan Binnington, Owen Sound	Stuart Percy, Mississauga; Nathan Beaulieu, Saint John	Andrew Shaw, Owen Sound; Devante Smith-Pelly, Mississauga; Jonathan Huberdeau, Saint John
2012	Michael Houser, London	Jarred Tinordi, London; Brandon Gormley, Shawinigan	Austin Watson, London; Michael Chaput, Shawinigan; Henrik Samuelsson, Edmonton
2013	Zachary Fucale, Halifax	Derrick Pouliot, Portland; Konrad Abeltshauser, Halifax	Nathan MacKinnon, Halifax; Martin Frk, Halifax; Ty Rattie, Portland
2014	Antoine Bibeau, Val-d’Or	Cody Corbett, Edmonton; Matt Finn, Guelph	Edgars Kulda, Edmonton; Kerby Rychel, Guelph; Henrik Samuelsson, Edmonton
2015	Ken Appleby, Oshawa	Madison Bowey, Kelowna; Ryan Graves, Quebec	Nick Merkley, Kelowna; Michael McCarron, Oshawa; Michael Dal Colle, Oshawa
2016	Tyler Parsons, London	Olli Juolevi, London; Haydn Fleury, Red Deer	Mitch Marner, London; Christian Dvorak, London; Timo Meier, Rouyn-Noranda
2017	Michael DiPietro, Windsor	Darren Raddysh, Erie; Mikhail Sergachev, Windsor	Gabriel Vilardi, Windsor; Alex DeBrincat, Erie; Taylor Raddysh, Erie
2018	Max Paddock, Regina	Noah Dobson, Acadie–Bathurst; Josh Mahura, Regina	Sam Steel, Regina; Jeffrey Truchon-Viel, Acadie–Bathurst; Samuel Asselin, Acadie–Bathurst
2019	Alexis Gravel, Halifax	Sean Durzi, Guelph; Noah Dobson, Rouyn-Noranda	Isaac Ratcliffe, Guelph; Félix Bibeau, Rouyn-Noranda; Benoit-Olivier Groulx, Halifax
2020	Event cancelled due to the COVID-19 pandemic – team not selected		
2021	Event cancelled due to the COVID-19 pandemic – team not selected		
2022	Nikolas Hurtubise, Saint John	Yan Kuznetsov, Saint John; Arber Xhekaj, Hamilton	Mavrik Bourque, Shawinigan; William Dufour, Saint John; Mason McTavish, Hamilton
2023	William Rousseau, Quebec	Nolan Allan, Seattle; Olen Zellweger, Kamloops	Kyle Crnkovic, Seattle; James Malatesta, Quebec; Théo Rochette, Quebec
2024	Michael Simpson, London	Rodwin Dionicio, Saginaw; Denton Mateychuk, Moose Jaw	Owen Beck, Saginaw; Kasper Halttunen, London; Brayden Yager, Moose Jaw
2025	Austin Elliott, London	Sam Dickinson, London; Tanner Molendyk, Medicine Hat	Easton Cowan, London; Gavin McKenna, Medicine Hat; Denver Barkey, London
2026	Christian Kirsch, Kitchener	Landon DuPont, Everett; Cameron Reid, Kitchener	Sam O'Reilly, Kitchener; Jack Pridham, Kitchener; Matias Vanhanen, Everett

== See also ==
- List of Canadian Hockey League awards
