= Guy Rouleau =

Guy Rouleau may refer to:

- Guy Rouleau (politician) (1923–2010), Liberal party member of the Canadian House of Commons
- Guy Rouleau (ice hockey) (1965–2008), Canadian ice hockey player
