= 2025 Memorial Cup =

Canadian junior men's ice hockey championship

Tournament details
- Venue(s): Colisée Financière Sun Life; Rimouski, Quebec
- Dates: May 23 – June 1, 2025
- Teams: 4
- Host team: Rimouski Océanic (QMJHL)
- TV partner(s): TSN, RDS, NHL Network, WNEM-TV 5 Plus, Victory+

Final positions
- Champions: London Knights (OHL) (3rd Title)
- Runners-up: Medicine Hat Tigers (WHL)

Tournament statistics
- Scoring leader(s): Denver Barkey (Knights) and Easton Cowan (Knights) (7)

Awards
- MVP: Easton Cowan (Knights)

The Memorial Cup trophy

The 2025 Memorial Cup was a four-team round-robin format ice hockey tournament held between May 23 and June 1, 2025, at Colisée Financière Sun Life in Rimouski, Quebec, Canada. It was the 105th Memorial Cup championship which determined the champion of the Canadian Hockey League (CHL). The tournament was hosted by the Rimouski Océanic, who won the right to host the tournament in December 2023. The London Knights defeated the Moncton Wildcats 5–2 in the semi-final, and the Medicine Hat Tigers 4–1 in the final to win their third Memorial Cup title.

== Road to the Cup ==
=== OHL playoffs ===
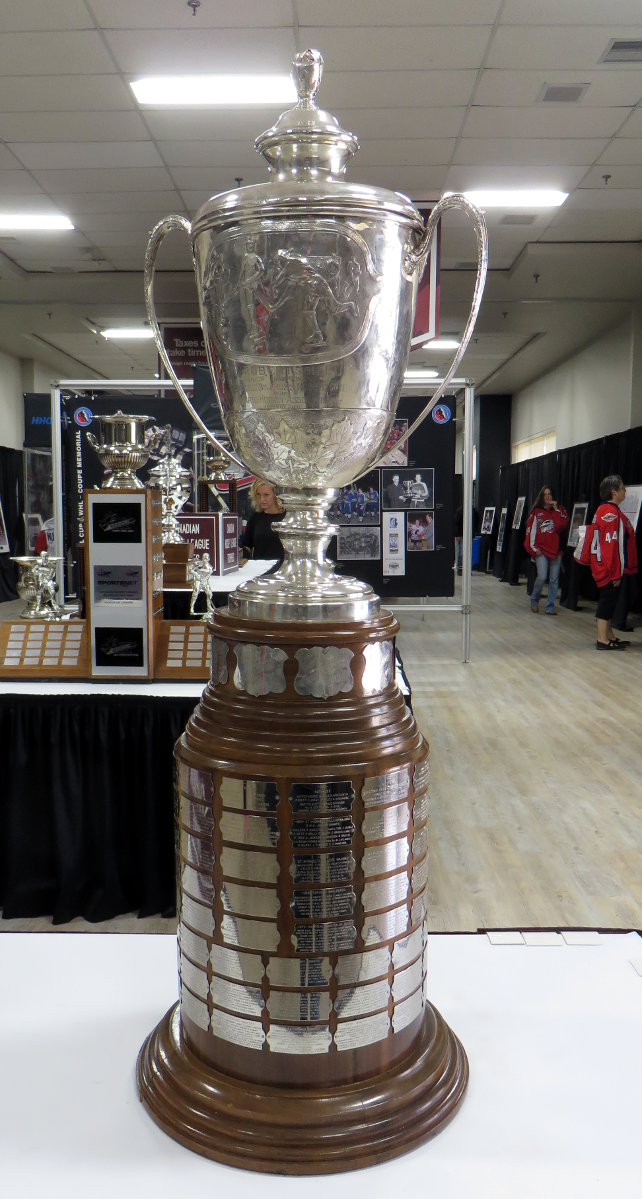
The J. Ross Robertson Cup, championship trophy of the OHL

Conference quarterfinals	Conference semifinals
E1	Brantford	4
E8	North Bay	1
E1	Brantford	2
E4	Oshawa	4
E2	Barrie	4
E7	Niagara	1
Eastern
E3	Kingston	4
E6	Sudbury	0
E2	Barrie	4
E3	Kingston	3
E4	Oshawa	4
E5	Brampton	2
Note: Pairings are re-seeded after the first round.
W1	London	4
W8	Owen Sound	0
W1	London	4
W5	Erie	0
W2	Windsor	4
W7	Sault Ste. Marie	1
Western
W3	Kitchener	4
W6	Flint	1
W2	Windsor	3
W3	Kitchener	4
W4	Saginaw	1
W5	Erie	4

Conference finals
E2	Barrie	0
E4	Oshawa	4
W1	London	4
W3	Kitchener	0

OHL finals
E4	Oshawa	1
W1	London	4

=== QMJHL playoffs ===
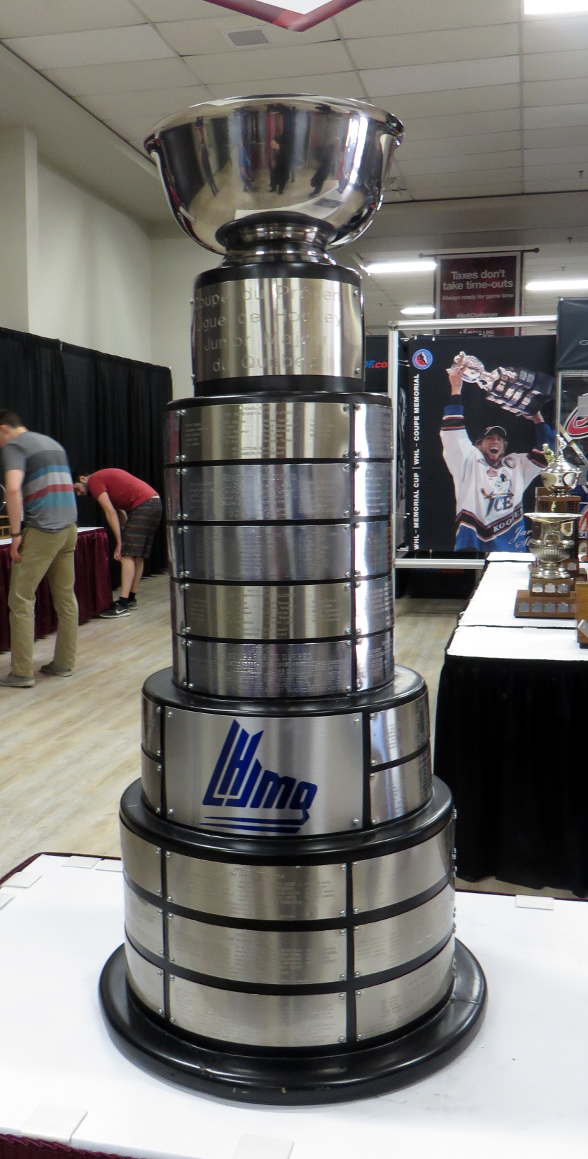
The Gilles-Courteau Trophy, championship trophy of the QMJHL

Notes:

- In the first two rounds seeding is determined by conference standings, and in the two final rounds seeding is determined by overall standings.

Conference quarterfinals
W1	Drummondville	3
E9	Halifax	4
W2	Rouyn-Noranda	4
W7	Gatineau	1
W3	Shawinigan	4
W6	Val d'Or	1
W4	Blainville-Boisbriand	1
W5	Sherbrooke	4
E1	Moncton	4
E8	Quebec	0
E2	Rimouski	4
E7	Charlottetown	0
E3	Chicoutimi	4
E6	Acadie–Bathurst	1
E4	Baie-Comeau	4
E5	Cape Breton	2

Conference semifinals
W2	Rouyn-Noranda	4
E9	Halifax	0
W3	Shawinigan	4
W5	Sherbrooke	0
E1	Moncton	4
E4	Baie-Comeau	1
E2	Rimouski	4
E3	Chicoutimi	2

Semifinals
1	Moncton	4
6	Rouyn-Noranda	0
2	Rimouski	4
4	Shawinigan	3

QMJHL finals
1	Moncton	4
2	Rimouski	2

=== WHL playoffs ===
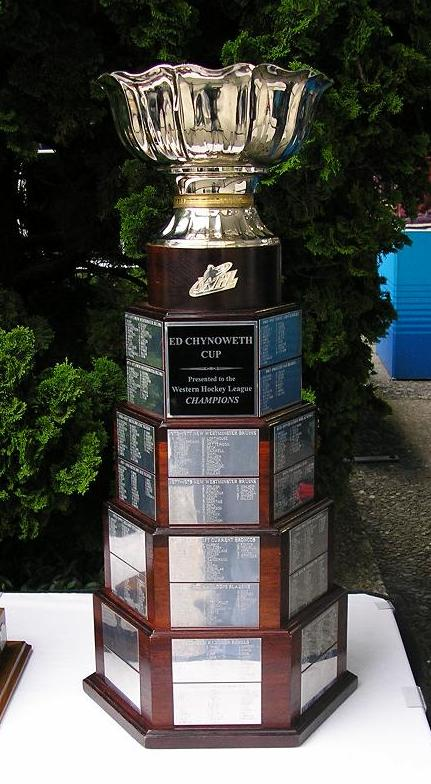
The Ed Chynoweth Cup, championship trophy of the WHL

Conference quarterfinals	Conference semifinals
E1	Medicine Hat	4
E8	Swift Current	1
E1	Medicine Hat	4
E2	Prince Albert	0
E2	Prince Albert	4
E7	Edmonton	3
Eastern
E3	Calgary	4
E6	Saskatoon	0
E3	Calgary	3
E4	Lethbridge	4
E4	Lethbridge	4
E5	Brandon	1
Note: Teams are re-seeded based on regular season points after the first round.
W1	Everett	4
W8	Seattle	2
W1	Everett	3
W5	Portland	4
W2	Victoria	4
W7	Tri-City	1
Western
W3	Spokane	4
W6	Vancouver	1
W2	Victoria	2
W3	Spokane	4
W4	Prince George	3
W5	Portland	4

Conference finals
E1	Medicine Hat	4
E4	Lethbridge	0
W3	Spokane	4
W5	Portland	0

WHL finals
E1	Medicine Hat	4
W3	Spokane	1

== Team rosters ==
=== Rimouski Océanic ===
- Head coach: Joël Perrault

Pos.	No.	Player
G	31	Mathis Langevin
G	35	William Lacelle
D	5	Pier-Olivier Roy
D	6	Anthony Paré
D	7	Olivier Théberge
D	8	Jack Martin
D	10	Luke Coughlin
D	15	Spencer Gill
D	19	Basile Sansonnens
D	26	Connor Sturgeon
F	13	Maxime Coursol
F	14	Loic Francoeur
F	16	Jonathan Fauchon
F	17	Thomas Belzil
F	22	Alexandre Blais
F	23	Anthony Gaudet
F	24	Mathys Dubé
F	25	Logan Roop
F	27	Dominic Pilote
F	29	Maël Lavigne
F	37	Maël St-Denis
F	67	Lou Lévesque
F	77	Mathieu Cataford
F	81	Jacob Mathieu
F	92	Eriks Mateiko

=== Moncton Wildcats ===
- Head coach: Gardiner MacDougall

Pos.	No.	Player
G	25	Rudy Guimond
G	60	Mathis Rousseau
D	3	Dylan MacKinnon
D	5	Étienne Morin
D	14	Dyllan Gill
D	21	Natan Grenier
D	24	Adam Fortier-Gendron
D	33	Loke Johansson
D	55	Simon Mullen
F	6	Markus Vidicek
F	9	Gabe Smith
F	10	Alex Mercier
F	12	Simon Binkley
F	15	Vincent Collard
F	16	Logan Crosby
F	18	Caleb Desnoyers
F	19	Maxime Côté
F	20	Preston Lounsbury
F	23	Riley Sampson
F	26	Julius Sumpf
F	37	Cooper Cormier
F	88	Juraj Pekarcik
F	90	Pier-Etienne Cloutier

=== London Knights ===
- Head coach: Dale Hunter

Pos.	No.	Player
G	31	Austin Elliott
G	78	Aleksei Medvedev
D	2	Henry Brzustewicz
D	3	Sam Dickinson
D	4	Andoni Fimis
D	17	Cam Allen
D	51	Jared Woolley
D	59	Oliver Bonk
F	7	Easton Cowan
F	11	Ryder Boulton
F	12	Kasper Halttunen
F	13	Jacob Julien
F	14	Evan Van Gorp
F	23	Sam O'Reilly
F	26	Logan Hawery
F	44	Jesse Nurmi
F	47	Blake Montgomery
F	55	Rene Van Bommel
F	73	William Nicholl
F	74	Noah Aboflan
F	86	Denver Barkey
F	90	Landon Sim
F	92	Noah Read

=== Medicine Hat Tigers ===
- Head coach: Willie Desjardins

Pos.	No.	Player
G	31	Jordan Switzer
G	35	Harrison Meneghin
D	2	Tyson Moss
D	18	Jonas Woo
D	22	Josh Van Mulligen
D	23	Veeti Väisänen
D	24	Tanner Molendyk
D	25	Niilopekka Muhonen
D	27	Bryce Pickford
F	5	Kadon McCann
F	7	Oasiz Wiesblatt
F	10	Mathew Ward
F	11	Schaeffer Gordon-Carroll
F	12	Liam Ruck
F	16	Hunter St. Martin
F	17	Carter Cunningham
F	19	Misha Volotovskii
F	21	Ryder Ritchie
F	26	Markus Ruck
F	28	Cayden Lindstrom
F	29	Ethan Neutens
F	34	Andrew Basha
F	39	Marcus Pacheco
F	72	Gavin McKenna

== Tournament games ==
All times local (UTC − 5)

=== Round-robin ===
May 23	Medicine Hat Tigers	5–4	Rimouski Océanic	Colisée Financière Sun Life	Recap
Ryder Ritchie (1) — 13:50		First period	19:40 – pp — Maël Lavigne (1)
Bryce Pickford (1) — pp – 16:18		Second period	10:43 - Maël St-Denis (1); 18:26 – pp — Jacob Mathieu (1)
Bryce Pickford (2) — 1:08; Gavin McKenna (1) — 5:16; Hunter St. Martin (1) — 17:19		Third period	13:04 – pp — Jonathan Fauchon (1)
Harrison Meneghin (20 saves / 24 shots)		Goalie stats	Mathis Langevin (33 saves / 38 shots)

May 24	Moncton Wildcats	2–3	OT	London Knights	Colisée Financière Sun Life	Recap
Etienne Morin (1) – 6:59		First period		1:31 – Sam O'Reilly (1)
Dyllan Gill (1) – pp – 12:22		Second period		5:11 – pp — Kasper Halttunen (1)
No scoring		Third period		No scoring
No scoring		First overtime period		4:23 – Sam O'Reilly (2)
Mathis Rousseau (45 saves / 48 shots)		Goalie stats		Austin Elliott (27 saves / 29 shots)

May 25	Rimouski Océanic	1–3	London Knights	Colisée Financière Sun Life	Recap
No scoring		First period	No scoring
Eriks Mateiko (1) - 2:14		Second period	9:47 - Henry Brzustewicz (1)
No scoring		Third period	14:53 - Jacob Julien (1); 18:08 - en - Easton Cowan (1)
Mathis Langevin (33 saves / 35 shots)		Goalie stats	Austin Elliot (28 saves / 29 shots)

May 26	Moncton Wildcats	1–3	Medicine Hat Tigers	Colisée Financière Sun Life	Recap
No scoring		First period	4:24 – Ryder Ritchie (2)
No scoring		Second period	9:42 – pp – Ryder Ritchie (3)
Dyllan Gill (2) – 0:31		Third period	19:53 – pp, en – Gavin McKenna (2)
Mathis Rousseau (38 saves / 40 shots)		Goalie stats	Harrison Meneghin (21 saves / 22 shots)

May 27	London Knights	1–3	Medicine Hat Tigers	Colisée Financière Sun Life	Recap
Kasper Halttunen (2) – pp – 3:34		First period	No scoring
No scoring		Second period	5:11 – Ethan Neutens (1)
No scoring		Third period	1:17 – Mathew Ward (1); 19:49 – en – Ryder Ritchie (4)
Austin Elliott (26 saves / 28 shots)		Goalie stats	Harrison Meneghin (35 saves / 36 shots)

May 28	Rimouski Océanic	2–6	Moncton Wildcats	Colisée Financière Sun Life	Recap
Maël St-Denis (2) - 13:27; Mathieu Cataford (1) - 17:11		First period	7:39 - Julius Sumpf (1)
No scoring		Second period	1:27 - Juraj Pekarčík (1); 4:05 - Gabe Smith (1)
No scoring		Third period	4:02 - Etienne Morin (2); 18:12 - en - Gabe Smith (2); 19:01 - en - Alex Mercier (1)
Mathis Langevin (27 saves / 31 shots)		Goalie stats	Mathis Rousseau (32 saves / 34 shots)

Round-robin standings

Pos	Team	Pld	W	L	GF	GA	GD	Pts	
1	Medicine Hat Tigers (WHL)	3	3	0	11	6	+5	6	Advance directly to the championship game
2	London Knights (OHL) (C)	3	2	1	7	6	+1	4	Advance to the semifinal game
3	Moncton Wildcats (QMJHL)	3	1	2	9	8	+1	2	Advance to the semifinal game
4	Rimouski Océanic (QMJHL) (H)	3	0	3	7	14	−7	0	Eliminated from playoff contention

Source: chl.ca/memorialcup/
(C) Champions; (H) Hosts

== Playoffs ==
Semifinals; May 30			Championship; June 1
			1	Medicine Hat	1
2	London	5	2	London	4
3	Moncton	2

=== Semifinal game ===
May 30	Moncton Wildcats	2–5	London Knights	Colisée Financière Sun Life	Recap
Caleb Desnoyers (1) – pp – 18:20		First period	4:07 – Landon Sim (1)
Dyllan Gill (3) – pp – 7:40		Second period	5:24 – Denver Barkey (1)
No scoring		Third period	3:35 – Blake Montgomery (1); 13:11 – Jesse Nurmi (1); 18:11 – en – Easton Cowan (2)
Mathis Rousseau (32 saves / 36 shots)		Goalie stats	Austin Elliott (21 saves / 23 shots)

=== Championship game ===
June 1	London Knights	4–1	Medicine Hat Tigers	Colisée Financière Sun Life	Recap
Jacob Julien (2) - 11:21		First period	No scoring
Easton Cowan (3) - 3:13; Denver Barkey (2) - 4:53; Denver Barkey (3) - pp - 12:08		Second period	No scoring
No scoring		Third period	2:43 - Gavin McKenna (3)
Auston Elliott (31 saves / 32 shots)		Goalie stats	Harrison Meneghin (20 saves / 24 shots)

== Statistical leaders ==
=== Skaters ===
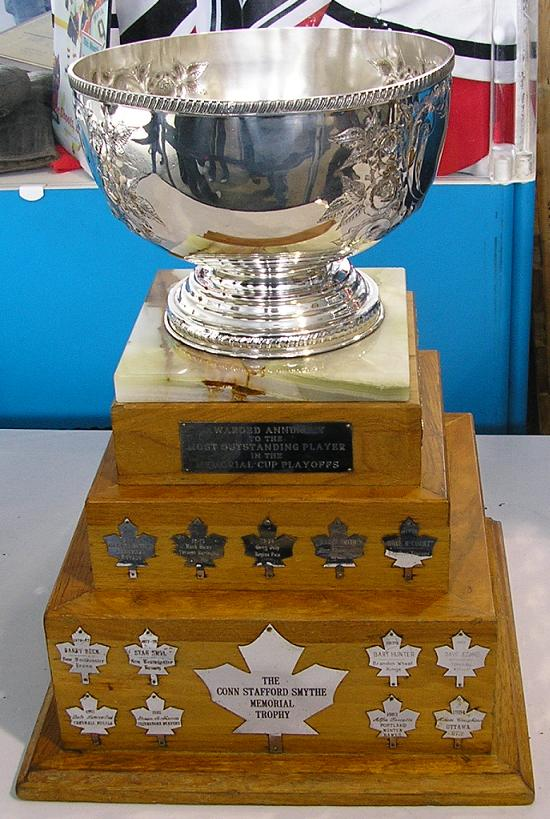
The Stafford Smythe Memorial Trophy, awarded to the most outstanding player in the Memorial Cup playoffs

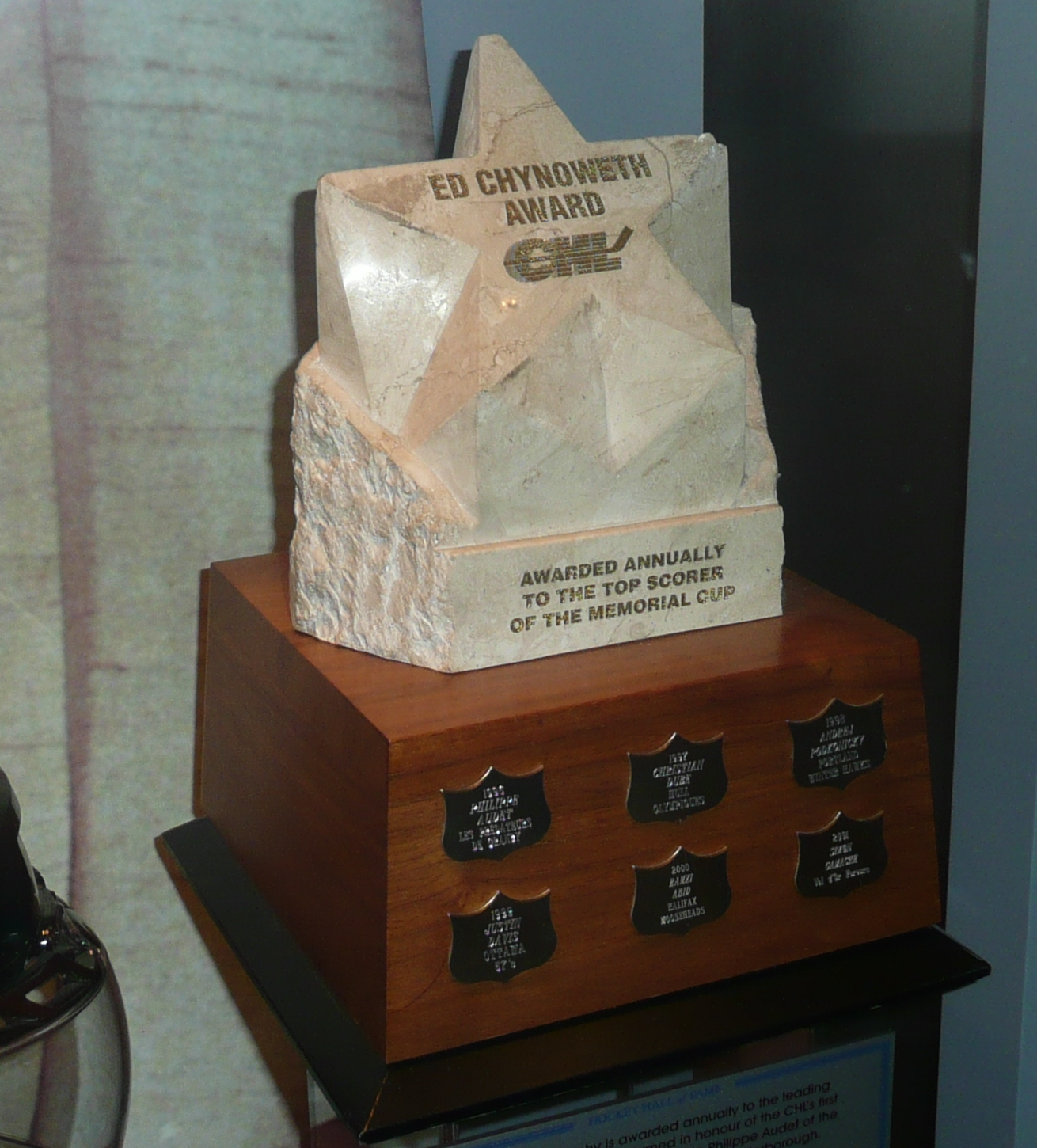
The Ed Chynoweth Trophy, awarded to the top scorer in the Memorial Cup tournament

- GP = Games played; G = Goals; A = Assists; Pts = Points; PIM = Penalty minutes

Player	Team	GP	G	A	Pts	PIM
Denver Barkey	London Knights	5	3	4	7	14
Easton Cowan	London Knights	5	3	4	7	6
Gavin McKenna	Medicine Hat Tigers	4	3	3	6	0
Sam Dickinson	London Knights	5	0	6	6	4
Ryder Ritchie	Medicine Hat Tigers	4	4	1	5	4
Sam O'Reilly	London Knights	5	2	3	5	2
Alex Mercier	Moncton Wildcats	4	1	4	5	0
Oasiz Wiesblatt	Medicine Hat Tigers	4	0	5	5	4
Gabe Smith	Moncton Wildcats	4	2	2	4	4
Kasper Halttunen	London Knights	5	2	2	4	0
Jacob Julien	London Knights	5	2	2	4	0

=== Goaltenders ===
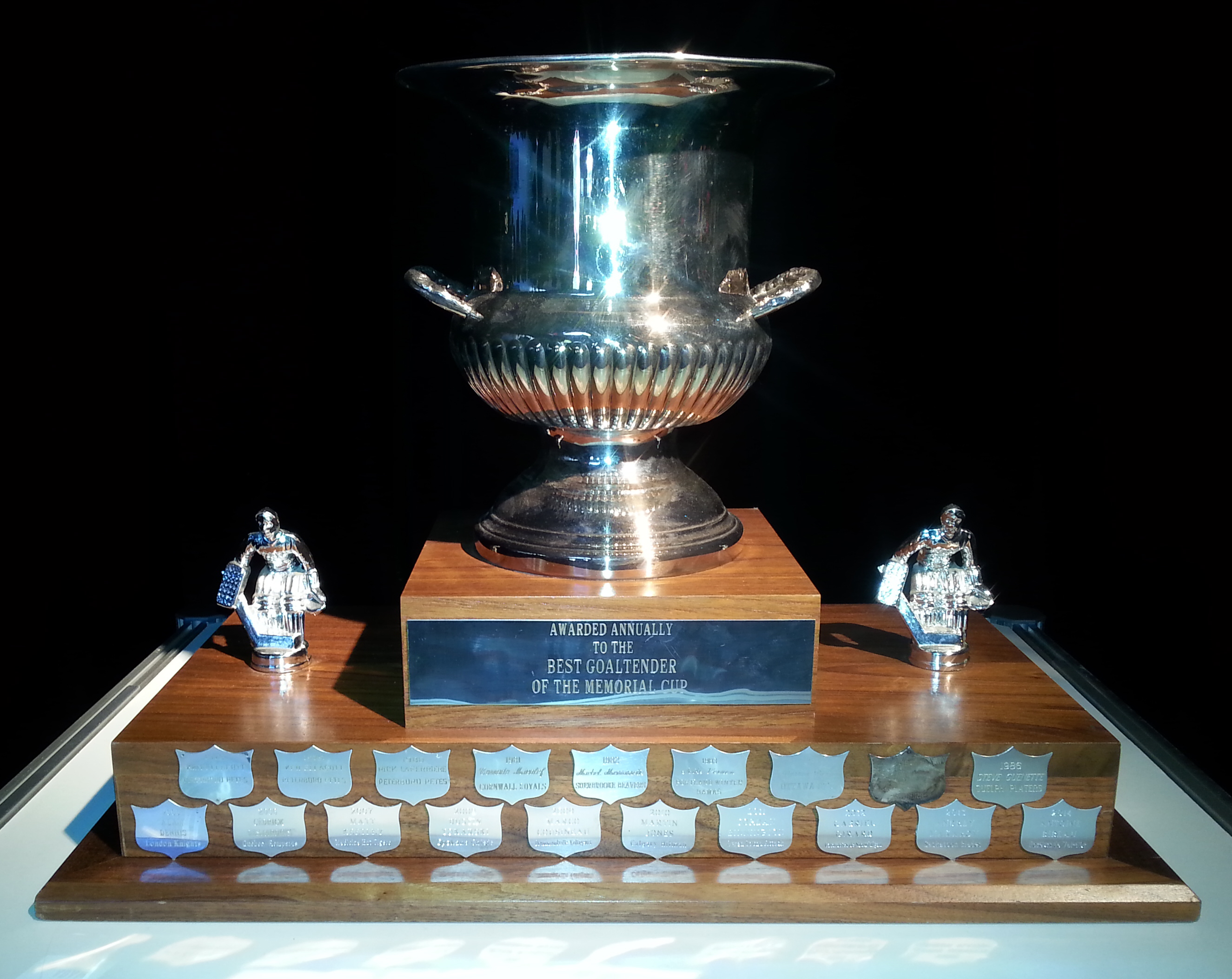
Hap Emms Memorial Trophy, awarded to the best goaltender in the Memorial Cup tournament

- GP = Games played; W = Wins; L = Losses; SA = Shots against; GA = Goals against; GAA = Goals against average; SV% = Save percentage; SO = Shutouts; TOI = Time on ice (minutes)

Player	Team	GP	W	L	OTL	SA	GA	GAA	SV%	SO	TOI
Austin Elliott	London Knights	5	4	1	0	141	8	1.59	.943	0	302
Harrison Meneghin	Medicine Hat Tigers	4	3	1	0	106	10	2.54	.906	0	236
Mathis Rousseau	Moncton Wildcats	4	1	2	1	158	11	2.72	.930	0	242
Mathis Langevin	Rimouski Océanic	3	0	3	0	104	11	3.77	.894	0	175

== Awards ==
The CHL handed out the following awards at the conclusion of the 2025 Memorial Cup:

2025 Memorial Cup Awards
Award	Recipient(s)
Stafford Smythe Memorial Trophy; Most outstanding player	Easton Cowan (London Knights)
Ed Chynoweth Trophy; Top scorer	Denver Barkey (London Knights); Easton Cowan (London Knights)
George Parsons Trophy; Most sportsmanlike player	Alex Mercier (Moncton Wildcats)
Hap Emms Memorial Trophy; Best goaltender	Austin Elliott (London Knights)

Memorial Cup All-Star Team
Position	Recipient
Defencemen	Sam Dickinson (London Knights)
Defencemen	Tanner Molendyk (Medicine Hat Tigers)
Forwards	Denver Barkey (London Knights)
Forwards	Easton Cowan (London Knights)
Forwards	Gavin McKenna (Medicine Hat Tigers)
Goaltender	Austin Elliott (London Knights)
