= Denver Barkey =

Canadian ice hockey player (born 2005)

- Born: April 27, 2005 (age 21) Newmarket, Ontario, Canada
- Height: 5 ft 9 in (175 cm)
- Weight: 171 lb (78 kg; 12 st 3 lb)
- Position: Forward
- Shoots: Left
- NHL team: Philadelphia Flyers
- NHL draft: 95th overall, 2023; Philadelphia Flyers
- Playing career: 2025–present

Denver James Barkey (born April 27, 2005) is a Canadian professional ice hockey player who is a forward for the Philadelphia Flyers of the National Hockey League (NHL).

== Early life ==
Barkey was born April 27, 2005, to Sean and Devin Barkey, in Newmarket, Ontario, where he was raised alongside his older half-brother McLeod Wilson. Barkey began ice skating at the age of two, and he played minor ice hockey with the Newmarket Minor Hockey Association.

== Playing career ==
=== Junior ===
He made his junior ice hockey debut with the Markham Majors of the Greater Toronto Hockey League (GTHL) during the 2018–19 season, before spending the next two seasons with the Toronto Titans, though the 2020–21 GTHL season would be cancelled due to the COVID-19 pandemic. Following the completion of his GTHL career, Barkey was selected in the first round, 16th overall, in the Ontario Hockey League's 2021 Priority Selection by the London Knights.

Barkey was largely quiet during his first OHL season, recording only 15 points during the 2021–22 season. He took off the following season though, posting 59 points (including 22 goals) in 61 contests. Barkey's real breakout came during the OHL playoffs, as he scored 24 points (11 of them goals) in 20 games, helping London to the OHL finals. Following this breakout contests, he was then drafted 95th overall by the Philadelphia Flyers in the 2023 NHL entry draft.

Returning to London for the 2023–24 season, Barkey's game took another step up. On March 3, 2024, he was signed to a three-year, entry-level contract by the Flyers. Barkey ultimately finished the season with 102 points, including 35 goals, in 64 contests. He was named to the OHL Second All-Star Team. In the playoffs, London made a deep run to the championship final, winning the J. Ross Robertson Cup. Barkey had six goals and 27 points in 18 playoff games. As OHL champions, the Knights participated in the 2024 Memorial Cup, making it to the championship game, but losing to the host Saginaw Spirit. Barkey had one goal and three assists in four games. Following the season, he was invited to the World Junior Summer Showcase.

Barkey started the 2024–25 season in the OHL with London again. On October 16, 2024, he was named London's 53rd captain by a team vote. At season's end, he received the Dan Snyder Memorial Trophy as the OHL's humanitarian of the year. The league cited his organization "Barkey's Buds", which worked to provide London Knights game tickets for families in London Community Housing, as well hockey equipment for children with disabilities. Barkey was also named a Second Team All-Star for the second time. The London Knights won their second consecutive Robertson Cup, which Barkey called "a great way to cap-off what we've built here in London and there's one more thing to go win now." At the 2025 Memorial Cup, the Knights reached the final again, this time defeating the Medicine Hat Tigers for the title. Barkey tied for the tournament points lead with teammate Easton Cowan, sharing the Ed Chynoweth Trophy as a result, and was named to the Memorial Cup All-Star Team.

=== Professional ===
Barkey was assigned to the Lehigh Valley Phantoms, the Flyers' American Hockey League (AHL) affiliate, to start the 2025–26 season. On December 19, 2025, the Flyers recalled Barkey to an active NHL roster for the first time. The next day, on December 20, he made his NHL debut in a 5–4 shootout loss against the New York Rangers where he recorded two assists. Barkey scored his first NHL goal on January 3, 2026, in a 5–2 win against the Edmonton Oilers. Barkey appeared in all 10 of the Flyers' 2025-26 postseason games, scoring his first, and only, postseason goal in game four against the Pittsburgh Penguins on April 25, 2026.

== International play ==
Medal record

Men's ice hockey

Representing Canada

Hlinka Gretzky Cup
Gold medal – first place	2022 Canada	

Barkey represented the Canada under-18 team at the 2022 Hlinka Gretzky Cup. He won a gold medal as a member of Canada, recording two goals and four points in five tournament games.

== Personal life ==
Barkey's maternal grandfather, Randy Legge, played in parts of four seasons in the NHL and World Hockey Association (WHA) as a defenceman.

When Barkey was on the London Knights, he started a community initiative called Barkey's Buds that collected new and used hockey gear for children and families in London Housing, and provided game tickets for families that might not otherwise attend.

During his rookie season with the Flyers, Barkey lived with Trevor Zegras.

== Career statistics ==
=== Regular season and playoffs ===
			Regular season					Playoffs
Season	Team	League	GP	G	A	Pts	PIM	GP	G	A	Pts	PIM
2021–22	London Knights	OHL	53	7	8	15	16	5	1	1	2	4
2022–23	London Knights	OHL	61	22	37	59	34	20	11	13	24	18
2023–24	London Knights	OHL	64	35	67	102	28	18	6	21	27	16
2024–25	London Knights	OHL	50	25	57	82	22	10	9	11	20	10
2025–26	Lehigh Valley Phantoms	AHL	26	7	9	16	20	—	—	—	—	—
2025–26	Philadelphia Flyers	NHL	43	5	12	17	16	10	1	1	2	4
NHL totals			43	5	12	17	16	10	1	1	2	4

=== International ===
Year	Team	Event	Result	GP	G	A	Pts	PIM
2022	Canada	HG18	1st place, gold medalist(s)	5	2	2	4	4
Junior totals				5	2	2	4	4

== Awards and honours ==
Award	Year	Ref
CHL
Memorial Cup champion	2025	
Ed Chynoweth Trophy	2025	
Memorial Cup All-Star Team	2025	
OHL
J. Ross Robertson Cup champion	2024, 2025	
Second All-Star Team	2024, 2025	
Dan Snyder Memorial Trophy	2025	
