= Sam O'Reilly =

Canadian ice hockey player (born 2006)

- Born: March 30, 2006 (age 20) Toronto, Ontario, Canada
- Height: 6 ft 2 in (188 cm)
- Weight: 198 lb (90 kg; 14 st 2 lb)
- Position: Forward
- Shoots: Right
- NHL team (P) Cur. team: Tampa Bay Lightning; Syracuse Crunch (AHL)
- NHL draft: 32nd overall, 2024; Edmonton Oilers
- Playing career: 2026–present

Sam O'Reilly (born March 30, 2006) is a Canadian professional ice hockey player who is a forward for the Syracuse Crunch of the American Hockey League (AHL) as a prospect to the Tampa Bay Lightning of the National Hockey League (NHL). O'Reilly was drafted 32nd overall by the Edmonton Oilers in the 2024 NHL entry draft.

== Playing career ==
=== OHL ===
During the 2022–23 season, he was scoreless in five regular season games for the London Knights. During the 2023–24 season, in his first full season with the team, he recorded 20 goals and 36 assists in 68 regular season games. He ranked third among OHL freshmen in scoring. During the playoffs, he recorded five goals and seven assists in 16 games, and helped lead the Knights to the J. Ross Robertson Cup. He then played in the 2024 Memorial Cup, where the Knights lost the championship game to the Saginaw Spirit. Following the season, O'Reilly was named to the OHL Second All-Rookie team.

On June 28, 2024, O'Reilly was drafted 32nd overall by the Edmonton Oilers in the 2024 NHL entry draft. Following the draft, O'Reilly took part in the Oilers Development Camp and also later, their main training camp before being returned to the Knights for the 2024–25 season. On October 21, 2024, O'Reilly signed a three-year entry-level contract with the Oilers. During the 2024–25 season, O'Reilly recorded 28 goals and 43 assists in 62 regular season games. During the playoffs he recorded seven goals and 15 assists in 17 games and won a second consecutive Robertson Cup with the Knights. The Knights then returned to the Memorial Cup reaching the championship final for the second consecutive year and defeated the Medicine Hat Tigers for the title.

On July 8, 2025, O'Reilly was traded to the Tampa Bay Lightning in exchange for Isaac Howard.

O'Reilly was named captain of London Knights for the 2025–26 season.

On January 7, 2026 forward was traded to the Kitchener Rangers in ''blockbuster'', along with defenseman Jared Woolley, in exchange for Jacob Xu and ten draft picks.

=== NHL ===
After participating in the Tampa Bay Lightning's training camp, O'Reilly would start the 2025–26 season with the Lightning's American Hockey League (AHL) affiliate, the Syracuse Crunch. He appeared in 12 games and recorded two goals and two assists before being recalled to Tampa Bay due to an injury to Brayden Point.

O'Reilly would make his NHL debut on November 11, 2026, in an 8–3 victory over the Buffalo Sabres. He would pick up his first NHL point in that game, assisting on a Yanni Gourde goal.

== International play ==
Medal record

Men's ice hockey

Representing Canada

World Junior Championships
Bronze medal – third place	2026 United States	

In December 2025, he was selected to represent Canada at the 2026 World Junior Championships. During the tournament he recorded four goals and four assists in seven games and won a bronze medal.

== Personal life ==
O'Reilly's nickname is "Peanut", due to his peanut allergy.

== Career statistics ==
=== Regular season and playoffs ===
			Regular season					Playoffs
Season	Team	League	GP	G	A	Pts	PIM	GP	G	A	Pts	PIM
2022–23	London Knights	OHL	5	0	0	0	0	3	0	0	0	0
2023–24	London Knights	OHL	68	20	36	56	34	16	5	7	12	13
2024–25	London Knights	OHL	62	28	43	71	40	17	7	15	22	7
2025–26	London Knights	OHL	28	12	16	28	11	—	—	—	—	—
2025–26	Kitchener Rangers	OHL	28	17	26	43	11	18	17	11	28	12
OHL totals			191	77	121	198	96	54	29	33	62	32

=== International ===
Year	Team	Event	Result	GP	G	A	Pts	PIM
2026	Canada	WJC	3rd place, bronze medalist(s)	7	4	4	8	0
Junior totals				7	4	4	8	0

== Awards and honours ==
Award	Year	Ref
CHL
Memorial Cup champion	2025, 2026	
Stafford Smythe Memorial Trophy	2026	
Memorial Cup All-Star Team	2026	
OHL
Second All-Rookie Team	2024	
J. Ross Robertson Cup champion	2024, 2025, 2026	
First All-Star Team	2026	
Wayne Gretzky 99 Award	2026	
Red Tilson Trophy	2026	

Awards and achievements
Preceded by Reid Schaefer	Edmonton Oilers' first-round draft pick 2024	Succeeded by Incumbent
