= Prospera Place =

Multi-use indoor arena in Kelowna, Canada

Coordinates: 49°53′34″N 119°29′41″W

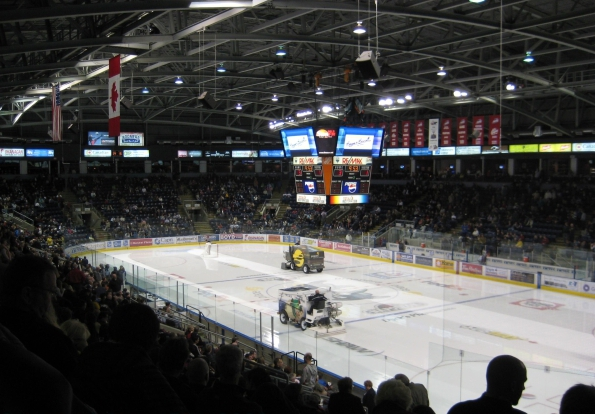
- Interior of Prospera Place

- Location within British Columbia Location within Canada
- Former names: Skyreach Place (1999–2003)
- Location: 1223 Water Street; Kelowna, British Columbia; V1Y 9V1
- Owner: GSL Group
- Operator: GSL Group
- Capacity: Concerts: 8,000; Hockey: 5,507; 6,286 (with standing room)

Construction
- Groundbreaking: August 9, 1998
- Opened: August 28, 1999
- Cost: $24 million ($42.4 million in 2025 dollars)
- Architect: ICR Projects Inc.
- Structural engineer: Weiler Smith Bowers
- Services engineer: Matteotti Yoneda Associates Ltd.
- General contractors: RG Construction, Ltd.

Tenant
- Kelowna Rockets (WHL) (1999–present)

Prospera Place, formerly known as Skyreach Place, is a 6,886-seat multi-purpose arena, in Kelowna, British Columbia, Canada. The facility opened in 1999 and is the home arena of the Kelowna Rockets of the Western Hockey League.

== History ==
Construction on Prospera Place broke ground in 1998 and the arena opened in 1999. When the Rockets moved to the city from Tacoma, Washington in 1995, it was understood that the team would require an arena upgrade over Kelowna Memorial Arena, which was constructed in 1945 and seated only 2,600. Although the Memorial Arena remains in use, Prospera Place, located near the lake shore in downtown Kelowna, took over as the city's primary venue for major events with the Rockets serving as its full-time tenant. Prospera Credit Union obtained naming rights to the arena in 2003.

== Major events ==
Prospera Place hosted the 2004 Memorial Cup tournament, in which the Rockets won their first and to date only Memorial Cup championship, defeating the Hull Olympiques in the final. The arena was slated to host the tournament again in 2020, but it was canceled due to the COVID-19 pandemic. Kelowna finally hosted its second Memorial Cup tournament in 2026.

Prospera Place was selected to host the 2021 Tim Hortons Brier, the Canadian men's national curling championship—marking the first time that Kelowna was selected as Brier host since 1968— but due to COVID-19 restrictions the tournament took place in Calgary instead. In October 2023, Curling Canada selected Kelowna to host the 2025 Montana's Brier.

The arena hosted the Skate Canada International in 2014, 2019 and again in 2026

WWE SmackDown! episodes were hosted and taped at the arena in 2003 and 2004.

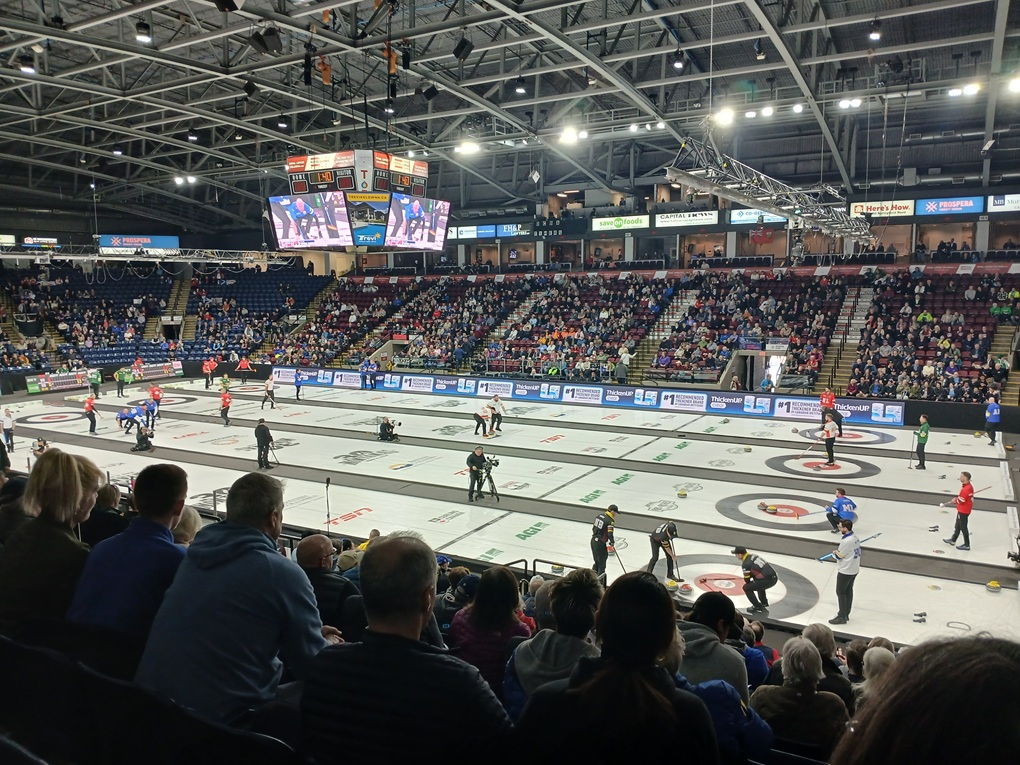
The 2025 Montana's Brier at Prospera Place

The So You Think You Can Dance Canada Tour came to the arena in 2009 and 2010.

Major events
Event	Sport	Year
Memorial Cup	Hockey	2004; 2026
The Brier	Curling	2025
Skate Canada International	Figure Skating	2014; 2019
