= Kelowna Rockets =

Western Hockey League team in Kelowna, British Columbia

- City: Kelowna, British Columbia
- League: Western Hockey League
- Conference: Western
- Division: B.C.
- Founded: 1991
- Home arena: Prospera Place
- Colours: Teal, Red, Copper, Black, White
- Owner: Bruce Hamilton
- General manager: Curtis Hamilton
- Head coach: Derrick Martin
- Website: chl.ca/whl-rockets

Franchise history
- 1991–1995: Tacoma Rockets
- 1995–present: Kelowna Rockets

Championships
- Regular season titles: 3 (2002–03, 2003–04, 2013–14)
- Playoff championships: Memorial Cup; 1 (2004); Ed Chynoweth Cup; 4 (2003, 2005, 2009, 2015); Conference Championships; 4 (2002–03, 2004–05, 2008–09, 2014–15)

Current uniform

The Kelowna Rockets are a Canadian major junior ice hockey team based in Kelowna, British Columbia. The team plays in the B.C. Division of the Western Hockey League's Western Conference, playing their home games at Prospera Place. The Rockets are the most successful WHL team in the twenty-first century, winning three regular season titles and four playoff championships. The team has also played in the Memorial Cup finals three times, winning once, in 2004, when Kelowna hosted the tournament.

== Franchise history ==
=== Foundations ===
The club was established in 1991 as the Tacoma Rockets, playing in Tacoma, Washington. The team played four seasons in Tacoma under head coach Marcel Comeau, who was named the league and the Canadian Hockey League's coach-of-the-year for 1992–93, although the team won only one playoff round. With the Tacoma Dome offering poor sight lines for hockey and attendance low, the team was sold and relocated to Kelowna in 1995. In Kelowna, the team spent its first four seasons playing at Kelowna Memorial Arena while a new, purpose-built arena—Prospera Place—was being constructed; the team moved to the completed arena in 1999.

=== Rise to prominence ===
Coached by Marc Habscheid and led on the ice by the likes of Jesse Schultz, Josh Gorges, Shea Weber, and goaltender Kelly Guard, the Rockets emerged as a contending team just after the turn of the century. In 2002–03, the team won its first Scotty Munro Memorial Trophy as regular season champions with a 51-win, 109-point season. In the playoffs, they defeated the Red Deer Rebels in the final to win their first President's Cup as league champions. At the 2003 Memorial Cup, Kelowna advanced to the semi-final, which they lost 2–1 to the Hull Olympiques. In 2004, the Rockets repeated as regular season champions before losing the Western Conference final to the expansion Everett Silvertips. However, Kelowna was able to participate in the 2004 Memorial Cup by virtue of hosting the tournament. At the tournament, the Rockets surrendered only three goals in four games en route to the championship, avenging the previous year's defeat to the Olympiques in the final, with Guard being named tournament MVP.

In 2004–05, the Rockets finished second overall in the standings to the Kootenay Ice, who they defeated in the Western Conference final to advance to championship series. There, the defeated the Brandon Wheat Kings for their second President's Cup in three seasons, and a berth in their third straight Memorial Cup tournament. However, at the 2005 Memorial Cup, the Rockets dropped three straight games and were eliminated.

=== Continued success ===
The 2006–07 season saw the Rockets miss the playoffs for the first time in team history, but the team's struggles would be short-lived. The 2008–09 season saw the Rockets, led by Tyler Myers, Jamie Benn, and Tyson Barrie, advance to their third league final, where they defeated the Calgary Hitmen. Benn led the 2009 Memorial Cup tournament in scoring, and the Rockets earned a spot in the final; however, they lost 4–1 to the Windsor Spitfires.

From 2013–14 to 2016–17, the Rockets advanced to four consecutive Western Conference finals. They won once, in 2015, moving on to defeat the Wheat Kings in the final. Led by tournament MVP Leon Draisaitl, the Rockets made a third finals appearance at the 2015 Memorial Cup, but lost 2–1 in overtime to the Oshawa Generals.

The Rockets missed the playoffs for a second time in 2018–19. The team was set to host the Memorial Cup for the second time in 2020; however, the tournament was cancelled due to the COVID-19 pandemic. In 2023–24, led by Tij Iginla, the Rockets won their first playoff series in seven years, defeating the Wenatchee Wild before losing in the second round to the Prince George Cougars. After the cancellation in 2020, Kelowna hosted the 2026 Memorial Cup tournament. At the tournament, the Rockets were eliminated after losing all three of their round robin games.

== Team uniforms ==
Since 2000, the Rockets' uniforms have featured a logo based on the legendary Okanagan Lake monster, Ogopogo. A third jersey design features the monster's head, taken from their shoulder patch design. The team's colours—carried over from their days in Tacoma—are teal, red, copper, black, and white. In 2009, their jerseys were slightly modified to fit the Reebok Edge system.

Early Rockets logos

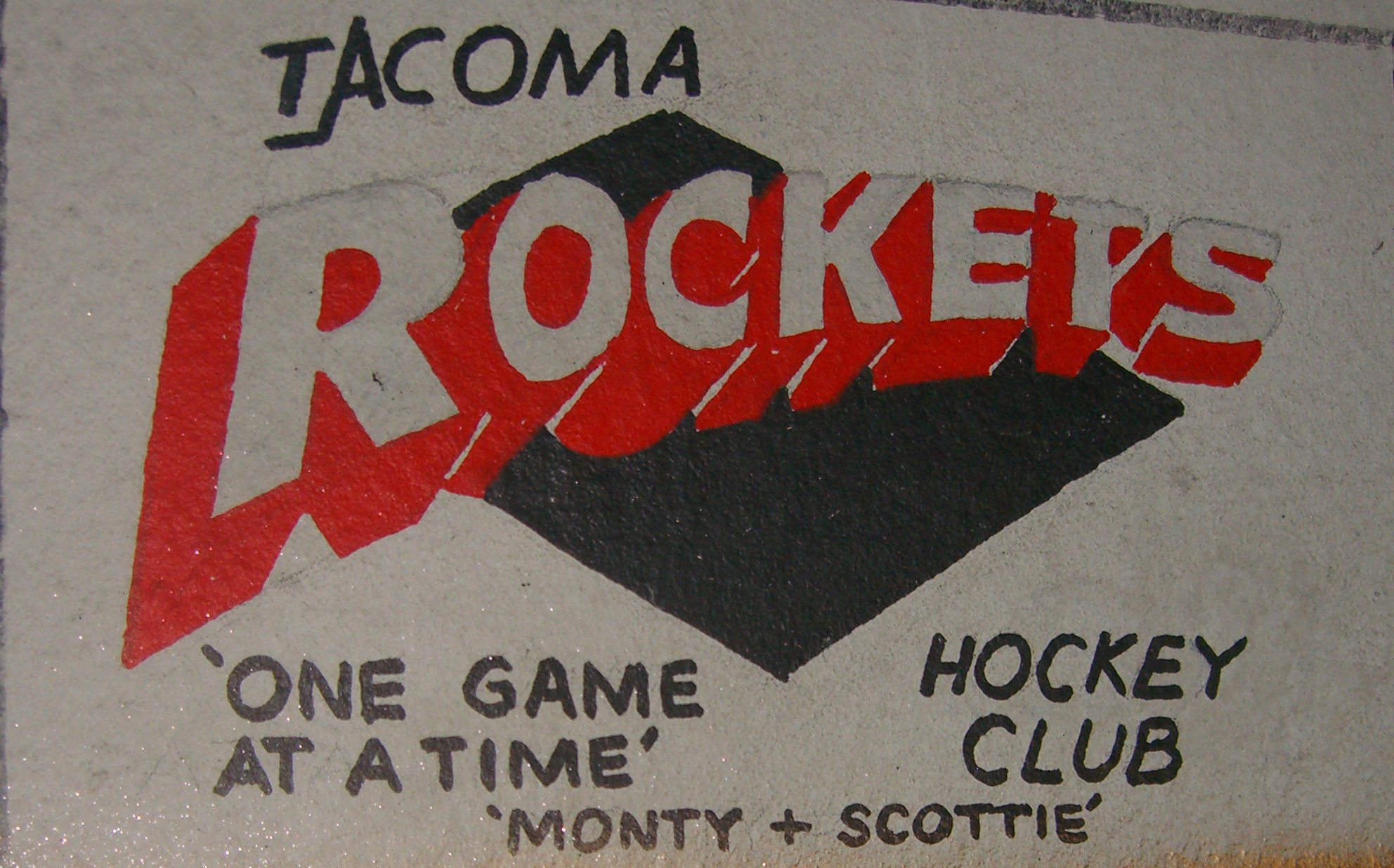
Rendering of the Tacoma Rockets logo, c. 1991–1994.

The original Kelowna logo, based on Tacoma's, c. 1995–2000.

== Season-by-season record ==
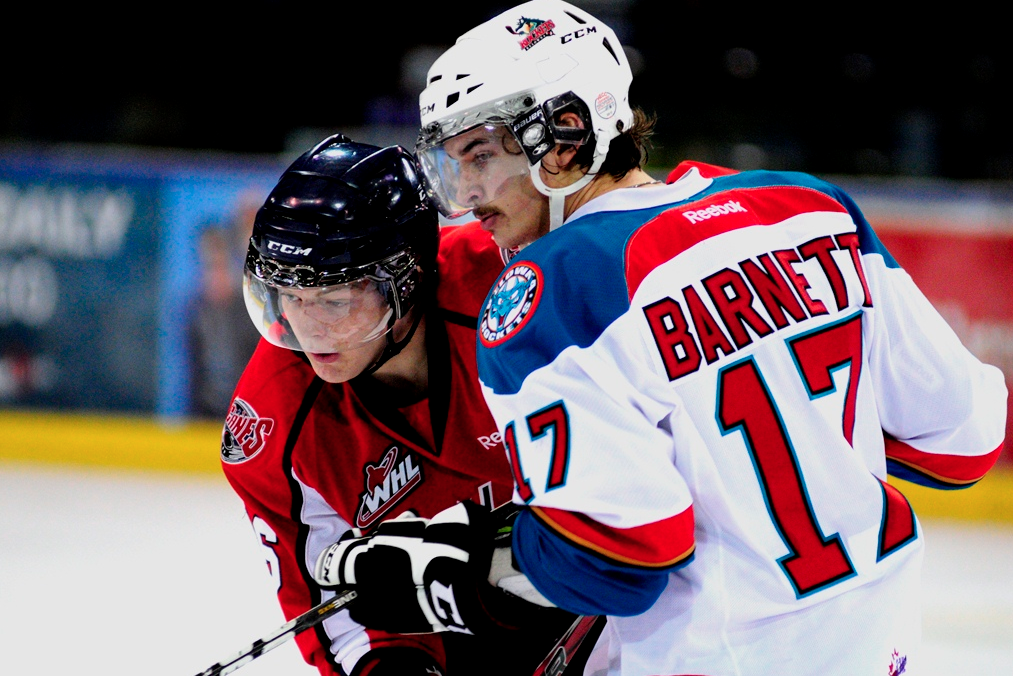
J. T. Barnett played for the Rockets during the 2012–13 season.

Note: GP = Games played, W = Wins, L = Losses, T = Ties, OTL = Overtime losses, Pts = Points, GF = Goals for, GA = Goals against, PIM = Penalties in minutes

Season	GP	W	L	T	OTL	GF	GA	Points	Finish	Playoffs
1995–96	72	35	33	4	–	338	309	74	4th West	Lost Western Conference quarterfinal
1996–97	72	35	35	2	–	298	314	72	4th West	Lost Western Conference quarterfinal
1997–98	72	33	35	4	–	234	253	70	5th West	Lost Western Conference quarterfinal
1998–99	72	25	42	5	–	224	282	55	6th West	Lost Western Conference quarterfinal
1999–00	72	25	40	4	3	193	228	57	5th West	Lost Western Conference quarterfinal
2000–01	72	37	23	7	5	259	240	86	1st West	Lost Western Conference quarterfinal
2001–02	72	31	26	10	5	257	232	77	4th B.C.	Lost Western Conference final
2002–03	72	51	14	6	1	311	164	109	1st B.C.	Won Championship; Lost 2003 Memorial Cup semifinal
2003–04	72	47	21	4	0	185	125	98	1st B.C.	Lost Western Conference final Won 2004 Memorial Cup
2004–05	72	45	13	12	2	215	139	104	2nd B.C.	Won Championship; Fourth place in 2005 Memorial Cup round-robin
2005–06	72	46	22	1	3	243	188	96	2nd B.C.	Lost Western Conference semifinal
2006–07	72	22	41	5	2	156	245	53	5th B.C.	Did not qualify
2007–08	72	38	26	2	6	248	215	84	2nd B.C.	Lost Western Conference quarterfinal
2008–09	72	47	21	1	3	267	178	98	2nd B.C.	Won Championship; Lost 2009 Memorial Cup final
2009–10	72	35	31	2	4	224	225	76	2nd B.C.	Lost Western Conference semifinal
2010–11	72	43	28	0	1	240	201	87	1st B.C.	Lost Western Conference semifinal
2011–12	72	31	31	4	6	217	242	72	3rd B.C.	Lost Western Conference quarterfinal
2012–13	72	52	16	3	1	309	178	108	1st B.C.	Lost Western Conference semifinal
2013–14	72	57	11	0	4	310	182	118	1st B.C.	Lost Western Conference final
2014–15	72	53	13	5	1	305	183	112	1st B.C.	Won Championship; Lost 2015 Memorial Cup final
2015–16	72	48	20	4	0	269	218	100	2nd B.C.	Lost Western Conference final
2016–17	72	45	22	5	0	283	206	95	2nd B.C.	Lost Western Conference final
2017–18	72	43	22	5	2	280	249	93	1st B.C.	Lost Western Conference quarterfinal
2018–19	68	28	32	6	2	169	209	64	4th B.C.	Did not qualify (Note: Lost tie-breaker game to Kamloops Blazers)
2019–20	63	29	28	3	3	181	208	64	4th B.C.	Cancelled due to the COVID-19 pandemic
2020–21	16	10	5	1	0	58	53	21	3rd B.C.	No playoffs held due to COVID-19 pandemic
2021–22	68	42	20	1	5	250	207	90	2nd B.C.	Lost Western Conference quarterfinal
2022–23	68	27	37	4	0	210	256	58	4th B.C.	Lost Western Conference quarterfinal
2023–24	68	33	30	4	1	250	258	71	2nd B.C.	Lost Western Conference semifinal
2024–25	68	18	44	4	2	213	311	42	5th B.C.	Did not qualify
2025–26	68	38	21	6	3	259	220	85	3rd B.C.	Lost Western Conference semifinal Fourth place in 2026 Memorial Cup round-robin

== Championship history ==
- Memorial Cup: 2004
- Ed Chynoweth Cup (4): 2002–03, 2004–05, 2008–09, 2014–15
- Scotty Munro Memorial Trophy (3): 2002–03, 2003–04, 2013–14
- Regular season Division titles (8): 2000–01, 2002–03, 2003–04, 2010–11, 2012–13, 2013–14, 2014–15, 2017–18

=== WHL Championship series ===
- 2002–03: Win, 4–2 vs. Red Deer Rebels
- 2004–05: Win, 4–1 vs. Brandon Wheat Kings
- 2008–09: Win, 4–2 vs. Calgary Hitmen
- 2014–15: Win, 4–0 vs. Brandon Wheat Kings

=== Memorial Cup finals ===
- 2004: Win, 2–1 vs. Gatineau Olympiques
- 2009: Loss, 1–4 vs. Windsor Spitfires
- 2015: Loss, 1–2 vs. Oshawa Generals

== NHL alumni ==
List of Rockets' alumni to play in the National Hockey League (NHL):

- Cody Almond
- Mikael Backlund
- Tyson Barrie
- Jamie Benn
- Karel Betik
- Troy Bodie
- Madison Bowey
- Brett Bulmer
- Mitch Callahan
- Mike Card
- Rourke Chartier
- Blake Comeau
- Kyle Cumiskey
- Leon Draisaitl
- Dillon Dube
- Alexander Edler
- Todd Fedoruk
- Vernon Fiddler
- Cal Foote
- Nolan Foote
- Mitch Fritz
- Carsen Germyn
- Robb Gordon
- Josh Gorges
- Tyrell Goulbourne
- Scott Hannan
- Lucas Johansen
- D. J. King
- Justin Kirkland
- Duncan Keith
- Chuck Kobasew
- Kaedan Korczak
- Joel Kwiatkowski
- Milan Kytnar
- Quintin Laing
- Colin Long
- Kole Lind
- Brett McLean
- Brandon McMillan
- Nick Merkley
- Josh Morrissey
- Travis Moen
- Tyler Myers
- Cam Paddock
- Scott Parker
- Dale Purinton
- Gage Quinney
- Richie Regehr
- Luke Schenn
- Jesse Schultz
- Ray Schultz
- Damon Severson
- Colton Sissons
- Sheldon Souray
- Nick Tarnasky
- Lassi Thomson
- Calvin Thurkauf
- Carsen Twarynski
- Vaclav Varada
- Shea Weber
- Nolan Yonkman

== See also ==
- List of ice hockey teams in British Columbia

== Notes ==
Preceded by Kitchener Rangers	Memorial Cup Champions; 2003–04	Succeeded by London Knights
