= 2026 Memorial Cup =

Canadian junior men's ice hockey championship

Tournament details
- Venue(s): Prospera Place; Kelowna, British Columbia
- Dates: May 22–31, 2026
- Teams: 4
- Host team: Kelowna Rockets (WHL)
- TV partner: TSN

Final positions
- Champions: Kitchener Rangers (OHL) (3rd Title)
- Runners-up: Everett Silvertips (WHL)

Tournament statistics
- Scoring leader: Jack Pridham (Rangers) (9)

Awards
- MVP: Sam O'Reilly (Rangers)

The Memorial Cup trophy

The 2026 Memorial Cup was a four-team round-robin format ice hockey tournament held at Prospera Place, home of the host Western Hockey League's Kelowna Rockets. The Kitchener Rangers defeated the Everett Silvertips by a 6–2 score to win their third Memorial Cup title.

It was the 106th Memorial Cup championship which determined the champion of the Canadian Hockey League (CHL). Five teams declared their intent to bid via news releases on their team websites: the Brandon Wheat Kings, Kelowna Rockets, Lethbridge Hurricanes, Medicine Hat Tigers, Spokane Chiefs. Lethbridge and Medicine Hat have never hosted the tournament, while Brandon has hosted once in 2010 and Spokane has hosted once in 1998. Kelowna has been selected to host the tournament twice, hosting it once in 2004, but the 2020 tournament it was slated to host was canceled due to the COVID-19 pandemic.

On November 27, 2024, the Canadian Hockey League named Kelowna as the host city at the 2024 CHL USA Prospects Challenge. The decision was made following formal bid presentations by all five teams in the running to the CHL's selection committee, the most teams bidding on a single Memorial Cup since 2009.

== Road to the Cup ==
=== OHL playoffs ===
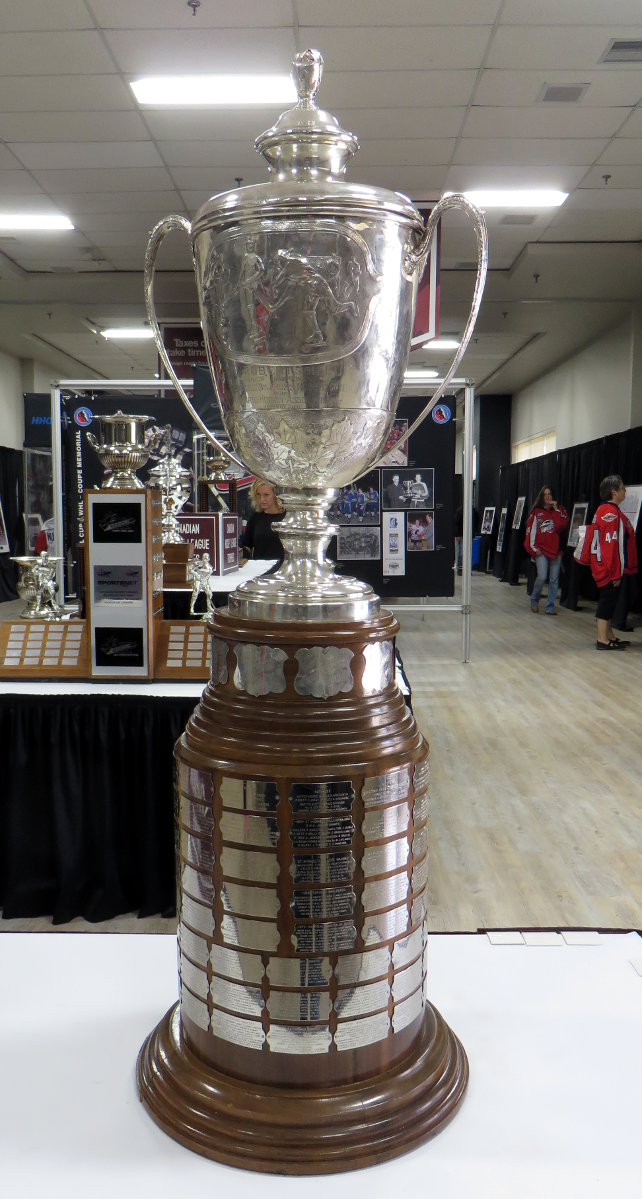
The J. Ross Robertson Cup, championship trophy of the OHL

Conference quarterfinals	Conference semifinals
1	Brantford	4
8	Sudbury	0
1	Brantford	4
5	North Bay	0
2	Barrie	4
7	Niagara	1
Eastern Conference
3	Ottawa	4
6	Kingston	0
2	Barrie	4
3	Ottawa	1
4	Peterborough	2
5	North Bay	4
1	Kitchener	4
8	Saginaw	0
1	Kitchener	4
5	Sault Ste. Marie	1
2	Windsor	4
7	Guelph	0
Western Conference
3	Flint	4
6	Owen Sound	0
2	Windsor	4
3	Flint	0
4	London	1
5	Sault Ste. Marie	4

Conference finals
1	Brantford	3
2	Barrie	4
1	Kitchener	4
2	Windsor	1

OHL Finals
E2	Barrie	0
W1	Kitchener	4

=== QMJHL playoffs ===
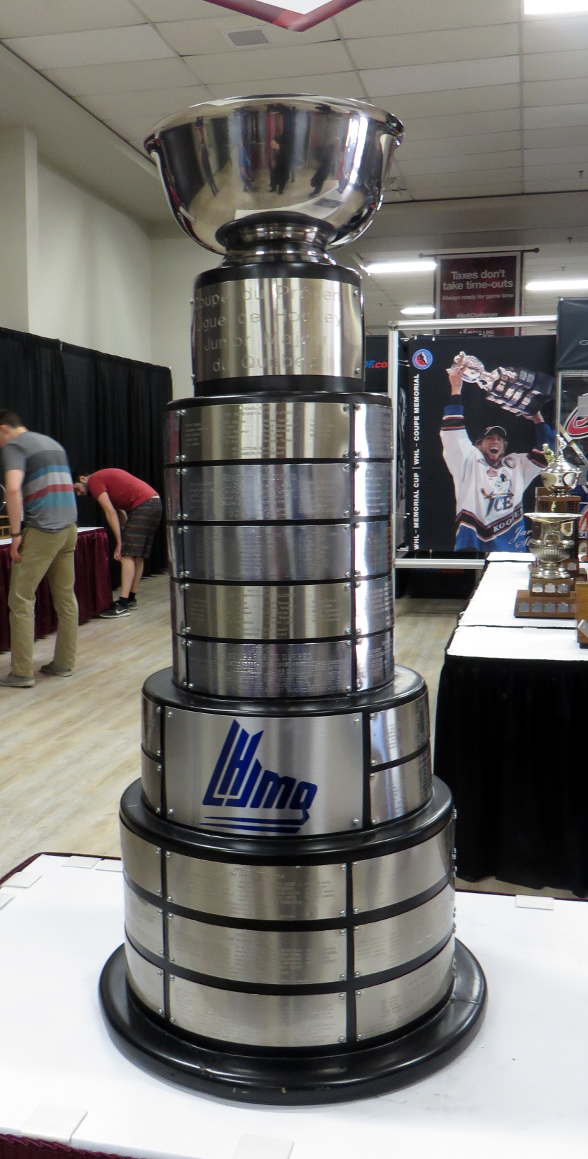
The Gilles-Courteau Trophy, championship trophy of the QMJHL

In the first round seeding is determined by conference standings, and in the final three rounds, seeding is determined by overall standings.

Conference quarterfinals
W1	Rouyn-Noranda	4
W8	Gatineau	3
W2	Blainville-Boisbriand	4
W7	Victoriaville	0
W3	Drummondville	1
W6	Val-d'Or	4
W4	Shawinigan	4
W5	Sherbrooke	3
E1	Moncton	4
E8	Saint John	0
E2	Chicoutimi	4
E7	Halifax	0
E3	Newfoundland	4
E6	Cape Breton	2
E4	Charlottetown	3
E5	Quebec	4

Quarterfinals
1	Moncton	4
13	Val-d'Or	0
2	Chicoutimi	4
9	Quebec	0
3	Rouyn-Noranda	4
7	Shawinigan	0
4	Blainville-Boisbriand	4
6	Newfoundland	2

Semifinals
1	Moncton	4
4	Blainville-Boisbriand	3
2	Chicoutimi	4
3	Rouyn-Noranda	2

Gilles-Courteau Trophy Championship
1	Moncton	2
2	Chicoutimi	4

=== WHL playoffs ===
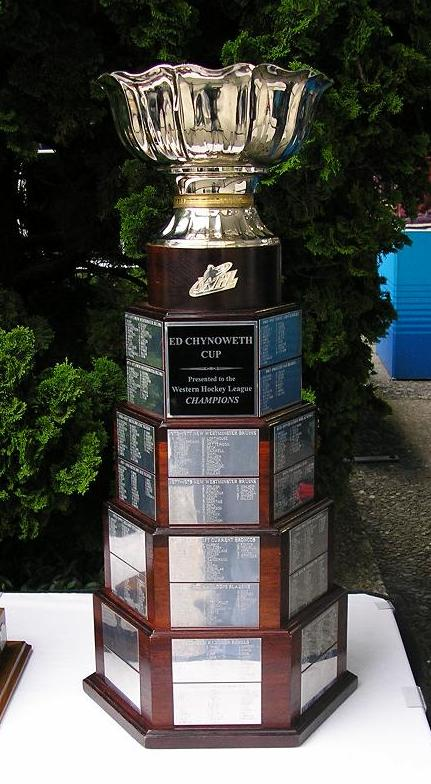
The Ed Chynoweth Cup, championship trophy of the WHL

Conference quarterfinals	Conference semifinals
E1	Prince Albert	4
E8	Red Deer	1
E1	Prince Albert	4
E6	Saskatoon	0
E2	Medicine Hat	4
E7	Regina	1
Eastern
E3	Edmonton	3
E6	Saskatoon	4
E2	Medicine Hat	4
E4	Calgary	0
E4	Calgary	4
E5	Brandon	0
Note: Pairings are re-seeded after the first round.
W1	Everett	4
W8	Portland	0
W1	Everett	4
W4	Kelowna	1
W2	Penticton	4
W7	Seattle	1
Western
W3	Prince George	4
W6	Spokane	2
W2	Penticton	4
W3	Prince George	2
W4	Kelowna	4
W5	Kamloops	0

Conference finals
E1	Prince Albert	4
E2	Medicine Hat	2
W1	Everett	4
W2	Penticton	0

WHL championship
E1	Prince Albert	1
W1	Everett	4

== Team rosters ==
=== Kelowna Rockets ===
- Head coach: Derrick Martin

Pos.	No.	Player
G	30	Harrison Boettiger
G	35	Josh Banini
D	2	Keith McInnis
D	3	Owen Hayden
D	4	Mazden Leslie
D	6	Parker Alcos
D	7	Peyton Kettles
D	22	Nate Corbet
D	26	Rowan Guest
D	27	Jacob Henderson
F	9	Shane Smith
F	10	Tomas Poletin
F	11	Tij Iginla
F	12	Connor Pankratz
F	16	Carson Wetsch
F	17	Ty Halaburda
F	18	Dawson Gerwing
F	20	Vojtěch Čihař
F	21	Owen Folstrom
F	23	Hayden Paupanekis
F	25	Jaxon Kehrig
F	28	Eli Barrett
F	29	Hiroki Gojsic

=== Kitchener Rangers ===
- Head coach: Jussi Ahokas

Pos.	No.	Player
G	39	Jason Schaubel
G	65	Christian Kirsch
D	5	Matthew Andonovski
D	8	Carson Campbell
D	18	Cameron Reid
D	25	Max Dirracolo
D	43	Andrew MacNiel
D	51	Jared Woolley
D	89	Alexander Bilecki
F	9	Avry Astis
F	11	Cameron Arquette
F	13	Haeden Ellis
F	16	Dylan Edwards
F	19	Luke Ellinas
F	20	Gabriel Chiarot
F	23	Sam O'Reilly
F	24	Jack Pridham
F	27	Andrew Vermeulen
F	37	Tanner Lam
F	48	Christian Humphreys
F	61	Matthew Hlacar
F	86	Luca Romano

=== Everett Silvertips ===
- Head coach: Steve Hamilton

Pos.	No.	Player
G	31	Anders Miller
G	35	Raiden LeGall
D	5	Luke Vlooswyk
D	8	Kayd Ruedig
D	9	Landon DuPont
D	24	Tarin Smith
D	28	Mattias Uyeda
D	42	Brek Liske
D	43	Jaxon Pisani
F	11	Carter Bear
F	12	Lukas Kaplan
F	15	Jaxsin Vaughan
F	16	Rylan Gould
F	17	Julius Miettinen
F	18	Nolan Chastko
F	19	Zackary Shantz
F	22	Jesse Heslop
F	25	Rhys Jamieson
F	34	Hunter Rudolph
F	37	Matias Vanhanen
F	38	Shea Busch

=== Chicoutimi Saguenéens ===
- Head coach: Yanick Jean

Pos.	No.	Player
G	30	Raphaël Précourt
G	32	Lucas Beckman
D	3	Tomas Lavoie
D	12	Alex Huang
D	13	Alonso Gosselin
D	44	Alexis Bernier
D	49	Jordan Tourigny
D	55	Peteris Bulans
D	92	Alexandre Desmarais
F	7	Maxim Massé
F	8	Christophe Berthelot
F	10	Maxim Schäfer
F	11	Émile Ricard
F	17	Thomas Desruisseaux
F	19	Gryphon Watson-Bucci
F	28	Emmanuel Vermette
F	39	Liam Lefebvre
F	42	Nathan Lecompte
F	71	Alexis Toussaint
F	86	Èmile Guité
F	88	Anton Linde
F	93	Mavrick Lachance

== Tournament games ==
All times local (UTC − 8)

=== Round-robin ===
May 22	Kitchener Rangers	5–0	Kelowna Rockets	Prospera Place	Recap
4:38 - Dylan Edwards (1)		First period	no scoring
17:33 - Jared Woolley (1)		Second period	no scoring
11:32 - Jack Pridham (1); 12:54 - Sam O'Reilly (1); 14:14 - Haeden Ellis (1)		Third period	no scoring
Christian Kirsch (24 saves / 24 shots)		Goalie stats	Harrison Boettiger (34 saves / 39 shots)

May 23	Everett Silvertips	5–3	Chicoutimi Saguenéens	Prospera Place	Recap
1:14 - Jesse Heslop (1)		First period	Christophe Berthelot (1) - 9:13
6:12 - Lukas Kaplan (1); 13:55 - Zackary Shantz (1); 14:45 - Carter Bear (1)		Second period	Alex Huang (1) - 5:39
19:39 - en - Matias Vanhanen (1)		Third period	Maxim Massé (1) - en - 19:39
Anders Miller (22 saves / 25 shots)		Goalie stats	Lucas Beckman (32 saves / 36 shots)

May 24	Kelowna Rockets	2–3	OT	Chicoutimi Saguenéens	Prospera Place	Recap
No scoring		First period		Liam Lefebvre (1) - 14:38
6:29 - Tij Iginla (1)		Second period		No scoring
15:50 - Mazden Leslie (1)		Third period		Anton Linde (1) - 14:01
No scoring		First overtime period		Liam Lefebvre (2) - 5:28
Josh Banini (26 saves / 29 shots)		Goalie stats		Lucas Beckman (27 saves / 29 shots)

May 25	Everett Silvertips	2–6	Kitchener Rangers	Prospera Place	Recap
12:32 - Matias Vanhanen (2)		First period	Cameron Reid (1) - 3:05; Jack Pridham (2) - 10:22
8:21 - Rylan Gould (1)		Second period	Christian Humphreys (1) - 9:46; Gabriel Chiarot (1) - 13:06; Jack Pridham (3) - 14:23
No scoring		Third period	Cameron Arqquette (1) - 17:07
Anders Miller (22 saves / 28 shots)		Goalie stats	Christian Kirsch (40 saves / 42 shots)

May 26	Chicoutimi Saguenéens	2–3	Kitchener Rangers	Prospera Place	Recap
no scoring		First period	no scoring
8:38 - Émile Ricard (1)		Second period	Luca Romano (1) - 1:28; Sam O'Reilly (2) - 3:57
16:06 - Mavrick Lachance (1)		Third period	Jack Pridham (4) - 0:21
Lucas Beckman (15 saves / 18 shots)		Goalie stats	Christian Kirsch (26 saves / 28 shots)

May 27	Kelowna Rockets	0–4	Everett Silvertips	Prospera Place	Recap
No scoring		First period	7:22 - Kayd Reudig (1); 7:47 - Jaxon Pisani (1)
No scoring		Second period	1:03 - Matias Vanhanen (3)
No scoring		Third period	13:07 - Carter Bear (2)
Josh Banini (9 saves / 12 shots); Harrison Boettinger (20 saves / 21 shots)		Goalie stats	Anders Miller (28 saves / 28 shots)

Round-robin standings

Pos	Team	Pld	W	L	GF	GA	GD	Pts	
1	Kitchener Rangers (OHL)	3	3	0	14	4	+10	6	Advance directly to the championship game
2	Everett Silvertips (WHL)	3	2	1	11	9	+2	4	Advance to the semifinal game
3	Chicoutimi Saguenéens (QMJHL)	3	1	2	8	10	−2	2	Advance to the semifinal game
4	Kelowna Rockets (WHL) (H)	3	0	3	2	12	−10	0	Eliminated from playoff contention

Source: chl.ca/memorialcup/
(H) Hosts

== Playoffs ==
Semifinal; May 29			Championship; May 31
			1	Kitchener Rangers	6
2	Everett Silvertips	6	2	Everett Silvertips	2
3	Chicoutimi Saguenéens	1

=== Semifinal game ===
May 29	Chicoutimi Saguenéens	1–6	Everett Silvertips	Prospera Place	Recap
12:01 - Tomas Lavoie (1)		First period	Jaxsin Vaughan (1) - 7:56; Landon DuPont (1) - 13:59
No scoring		Second period	Carter Bear (3) - 5:39; Zackary Shantz (2) - 12:35; Landon DuPont (2) - pp - 18:38
No scoring		Third period	Julius Miettinen (1) - pp - 0:45
Lucas Beckman (22 saves / 28 shots); Raphaël Précourt (8 saves / 8 shots)		Goalie stats	Anders Miller (25 saves / 26 shots)

=== Championship game ===
May 31	Everett Silvertips	2–6	Kitchener Rangers	Prospera Place	Recap
6:15 - Matias Vanhanen (4)		First period	Luke Ellinas (1) - 5:47; Dylan Edwards (2) - 13:15
No scoring		Second period	Jared Woolley (2) - 15:26
2:59 - Carter Bear (4)		Third period	Jack Pridham (5) - pp - 0:26; Sam O'Reilly (3) - pp - 1:06; Christian Humphreys (2) - sh - en - 18:23
Anders Miller (26 saves / 31 shots)		Goalie stats	Christian Kirsch (30 saves / 32 shots)

== Statistical leaders ==
=== Skaters ===
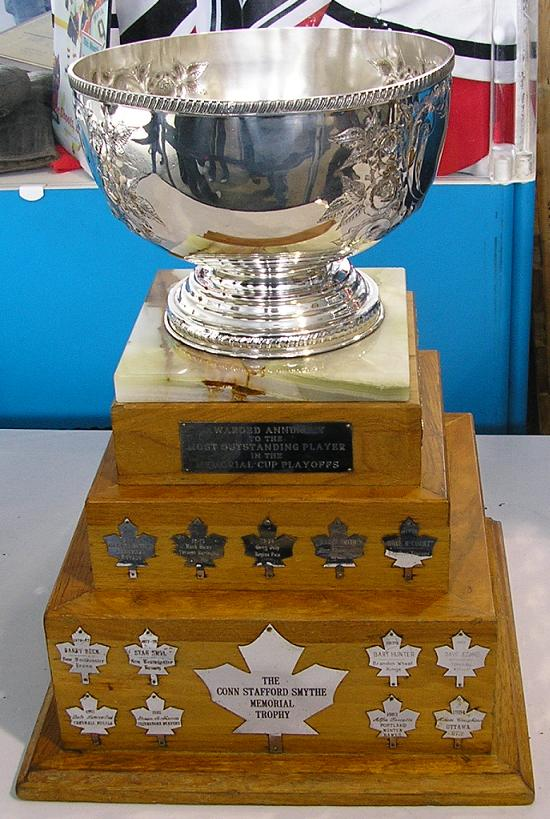
The Stafford Smythe Memorial Trophy, awarded to the most outstanding player in the Memorial Cup playoffs

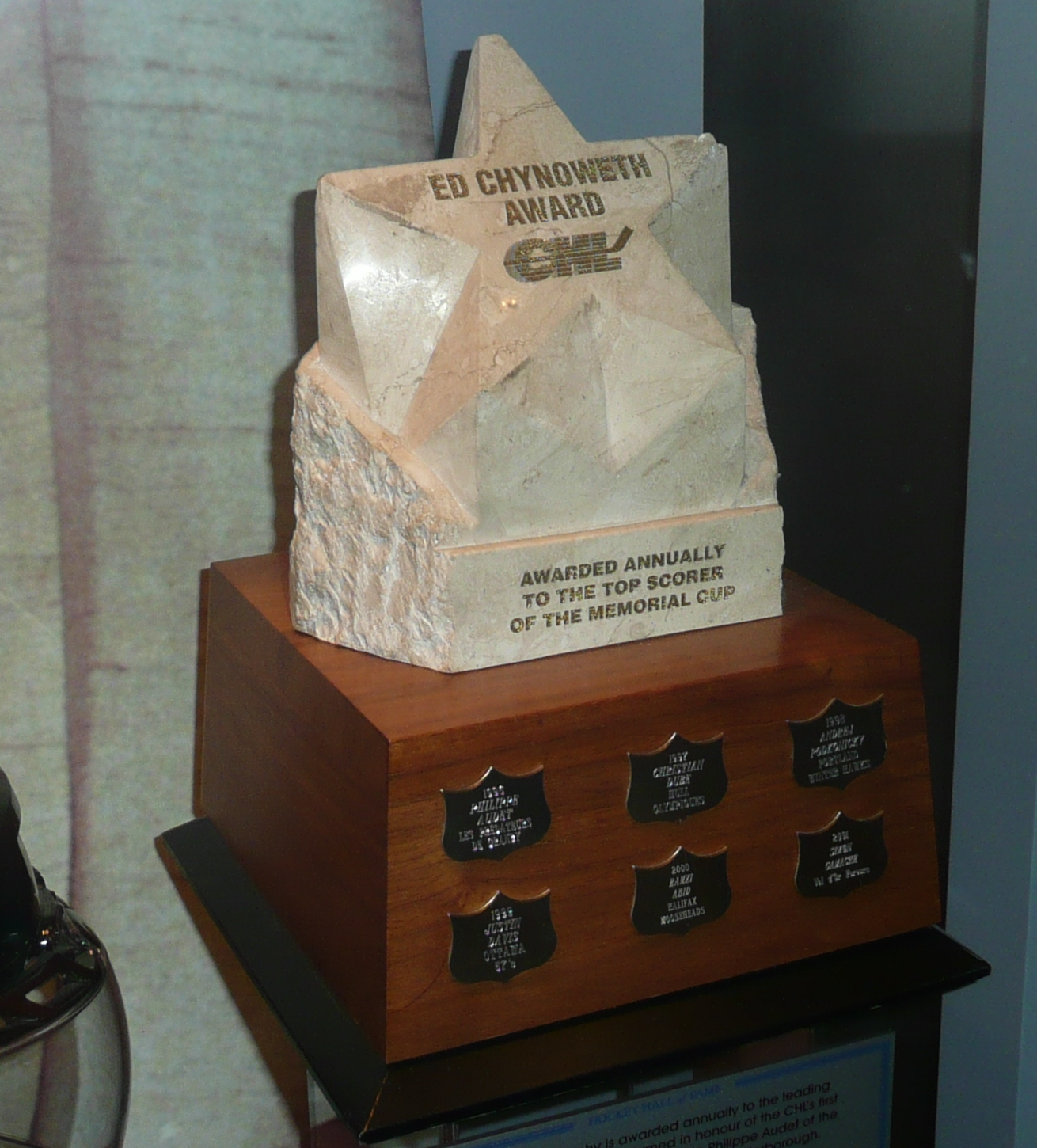
The Ed Chynoweth Trophy, awarded to the top scorer in the Memorial Cup tournament

- GP = Games played; G = Goals; A = Assists; Pts = Points; PIM = Penalty minutes

Player	Team	GP	G	A	Pts	PIM
Jack Pridham	Kitchener Rangers	4	5	4	9	8
Matias Vanhanen	Everett Silvertips	5	4	4	8	0
Sam O'Reilly	Kitchener Rangers	4	3	5	8	0
Dylan Edwards	Kitchener Rangers	4	2	4	6	0
Landon DuPont	Everett Silvertips	4	2	4	6	2
Cameron Reid	Kitchener Rangers	4	1	5	6	2
Carter Bear	Everett Silvertips	5	4	1	5	4
Nathan Lecompte	Chicoutimi Saguenéens	4	0	5	5	6
Liam Lefebvre	Chicoutimi Saguenéens	4	2	2	4	17
Haeden Ellis	Kitchener Rangers	4	1	3	4	2

=== Goaltenders ===
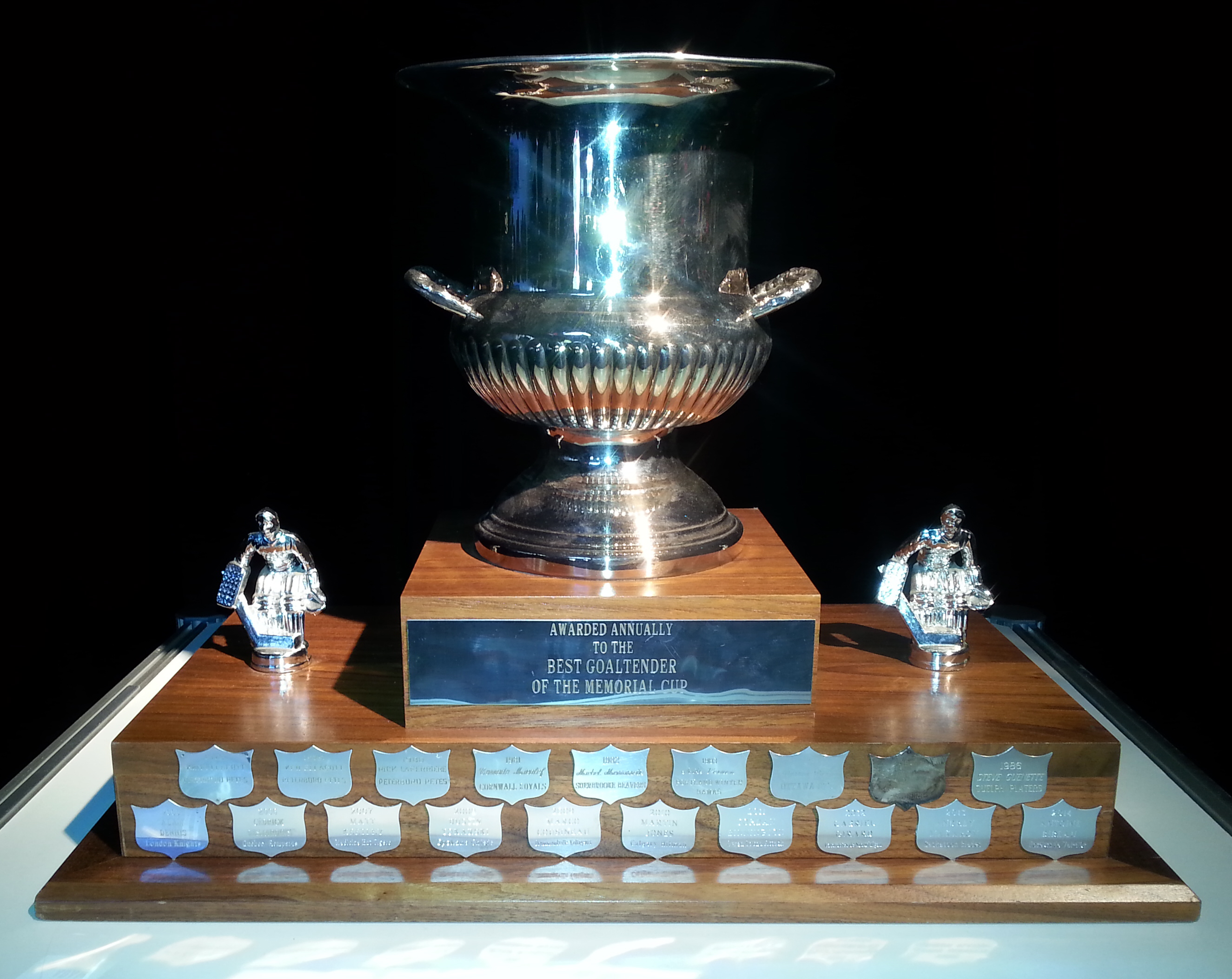
Hap Emms Memorial Trophy, awarded to the best goaltender in the Memorial Cup tournament

- GP = Games played; W = Wins; L = Losses; SA = Shots against; GA = Goals against; GAA = Goals against average; SV% = Save percentage; SO = Shutouts; TOI = Time on ice (minutes)

Player	Team	GP	W	L	OTL	SA	GA	GAA	SV%	SO	TOI
Christian Kirsch	Kitchener Rangers	4	4	0	0	126	6	1.50	.952	1	240
Anders Miller	Everett Silvertips	5	3	2	0	138	15	3.02	.891	1	298
Harrison Boettiger	Kelowna Rockets	2	0	1	0	61	6	3.64	.902	0	99
Lucas Beckman	Chicoutimi Saguenéens	4	1	3	0	111	15	4.06	.865	0	222
Josh Banini	Kelowna Rockets	2	0	1	1	40	6	4.16	.850	0	87

== Awards ==
The CHL will hand out the following awards at the conclusion of the 2026 Memorial Cup:

2026 Memorial Cup Awards
Award	Recipient(s)
Stafford Smythe Memorial Trophy; Most outstanding player	Sam O'Reilly
Ed Chynoweth Trophy; Top scorer	Jack Pridham
George Parsons Trophy; Most sportsmanlike player	Matias Vanhanen
Hap Emms Memorial Trophy; Best goaltender	Christian Kirsch

Memorial Cup All-Star Team
Position	Recipient
Defencemen	Landon DuPont (Everett Silvertips)
Defencemen	Cameron Reid (Kitchener Rangers)
Forwards	Sam O'Reilly (Kitchener Rangers)
Forwards	Jack Pridham (Kitchener Rangers)
Forwards	Matias Vanhanen (Everett Silvertips)
Goaltender	Christian Kirsch (Kitchener Rangers)
