= Cameron Reid =

Canadian ice hockey player (born 2007)

- Born: April 8, 2007 (age 19) Aylmer, Ontario, Canada
- Height: 6 ft 0 in (183 cm)
- Weight: 182 lb (83 kg; 13 st 0 lb)
- Position: Defence
- Shoots: Left
- NCAA team: Michigan
- NHL draft: 21st overall, 2025; Nashville Predators

Cameron Reid (born April 8, 2007) is a Canadian college ice hockey defenceman for the Michigan Wolverines of the National Collegiate Athletic Association (NCAA). He was drafted 21st overall by the Nashville Predators in the 2025 NHL entry draft.

== Playing career ==
During the 2023–24 season, in his rookie year, he recorded two goals and 21 assists in 49 games for the Kitchener Rangers. During the 2024–25 season, in his draft eligible year, he recorded 14 goals and 40 assists in 67 games. He led the team in assists and ranked third with 54 points. He participated in the 2025 CHL/USA Prospects Challenge and was named Team West MVP.

On June 27, 2025, he was drafted 21st overall by the Nashville Predators in the 2025 NHL entry draft.

On September 24, 2025, Reid was named the 60th captain in franchise history for the 2025–26 season. During the regular season he recorded 15 goals and 41 assists in 57 games. During the playoffs he recorded two goals and 12 assists in 18 games and helped his team win the J. Ross Robertson Cup. During the 2026 Memorial Cup he recorded one goal and five assists in four games to help the Rangers win their Memorial Cup in franchise history. At 19-years old, he became the second youngest captain to lead a team to a J. Ross Robertson Cup, trailing only Brian Bellows, who was 17 when he won the Memorial Cup title in 1982.

On June 18, 2026, he committed to play college ice hockey at Michigan during the 2026–27 season.

== International play ==
Medal record

Representing Canada

Ice hockey

World Junior Championships
Bronze medal – third place	2026 United States	

Hlinka Gretzky Cup
Gold medal – first place	2024 Canada	

Reid made his international debut for Canada White at the 2023 World U-17 Hockey Challenge where he recorded one goal and one assist in eight games and won a gold medal. He then represented Canada at the 2024 Hlinka Gretzky Cup, where he recorded two assists in five games and won a gold medal.

Reid represented Canada at the 2026 World Junior Ice Hockey Championships where he recorded one assist in seven games and won a bronze medal.

== Career statistics ==
=== Regular season and playoffs ===
			Regular season					Playoffs
Season	Team	League	GP	G	A	Pts	PIM	GP	G	A	Pts	PIM
2023–24	Kitchener Rangers	OHL	49	2	21	23	17	10	0	5	5	0
2024–25	Kitchener Rangers	OHL	67	14	40	54	44	14	0	5	5	2
2025–26	Kitchener Rangers	OHL	57	15	41	56	29	18	2	12	14	2
OHL totals			173	31	102	133	90	42	2	22	24	4

=== International ===
Year	Team	Event	Result	GP	G	A	Pts	PIM
2023	Canada White	U17	1st place, gold medalist(s)	8	1	1	2	0
2024	Canada	HG18	1st place, gold medalist(s)	5	0	2	2	0
2026	Canada	WJC	3rd place, bronze medalist(s)	7	0	1	1	0
Junior totals				20	1	4	5	0

== Awards and honours ==
Award	Year	Ref
CHL
Memorial Cup Champion	2026	
Memorial Cup All Star Team	2026	
OHL
J. Ross Robertson Cup Champion	2026	

Awards and achievements
Preceded by Brady Martin	Nashville Predators first-round draft pick 2025	Succeeded by Ryker Lee
