= Colisée Financière Sun Life =

Arena in Rimouski, Quebec, Canada

Coordinates: 48°26′30″N 68°31′13″W

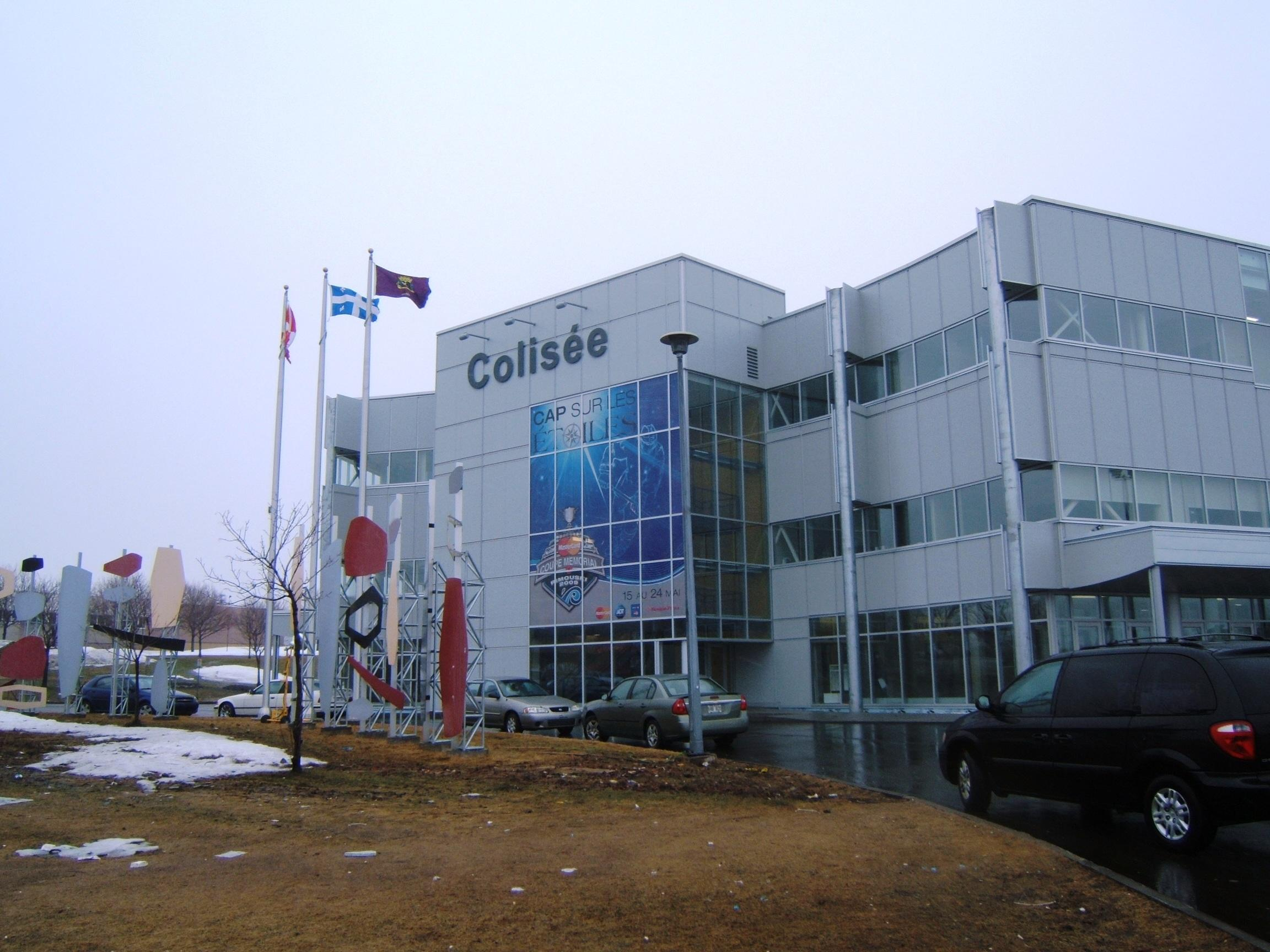

- Location in Quebec Location in Canada
- Location: 111, 2e Rue Ouest; Rimouski, Quebec, Canada
- Owner: Rimouski
- Capacity: Hockey: 4,030

Construction
- Opened: 1966

Tenant
- Rimouski Océanic

The Colisée Financière Sun Life (in English, Sun Life Financial Coliseum, formerly the Colisée de Rimouski) is a 4,030-seat (total capacity 4,851) multi-purpose arena in Rimouski, Quebec, Canada, built in 1966. It is home to the Rimouski Océanic ice hockey team, and the arena hosted the 2009 and 2025 Memorial Cups.

== Gallery ==
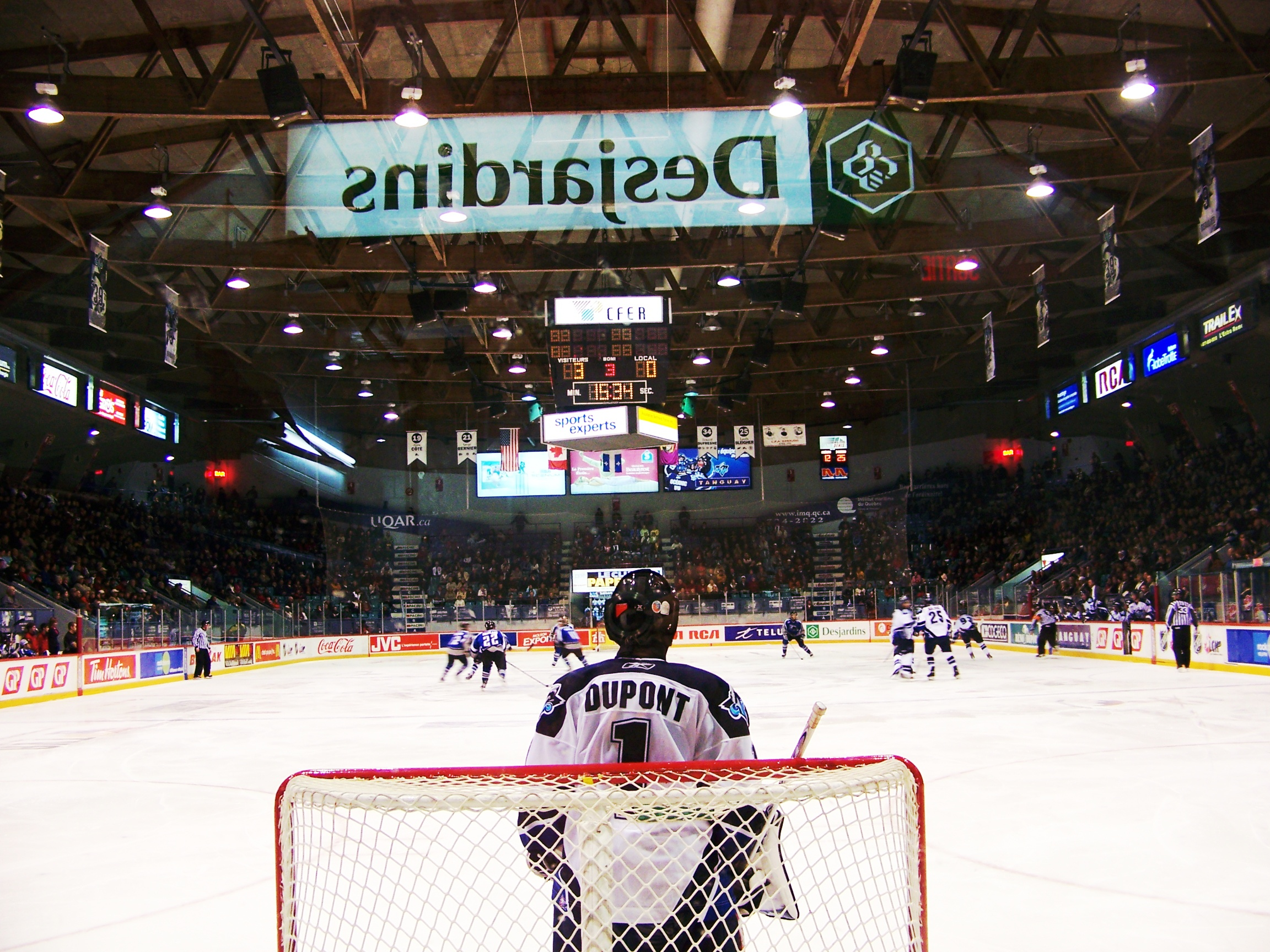
Interior of Colisée

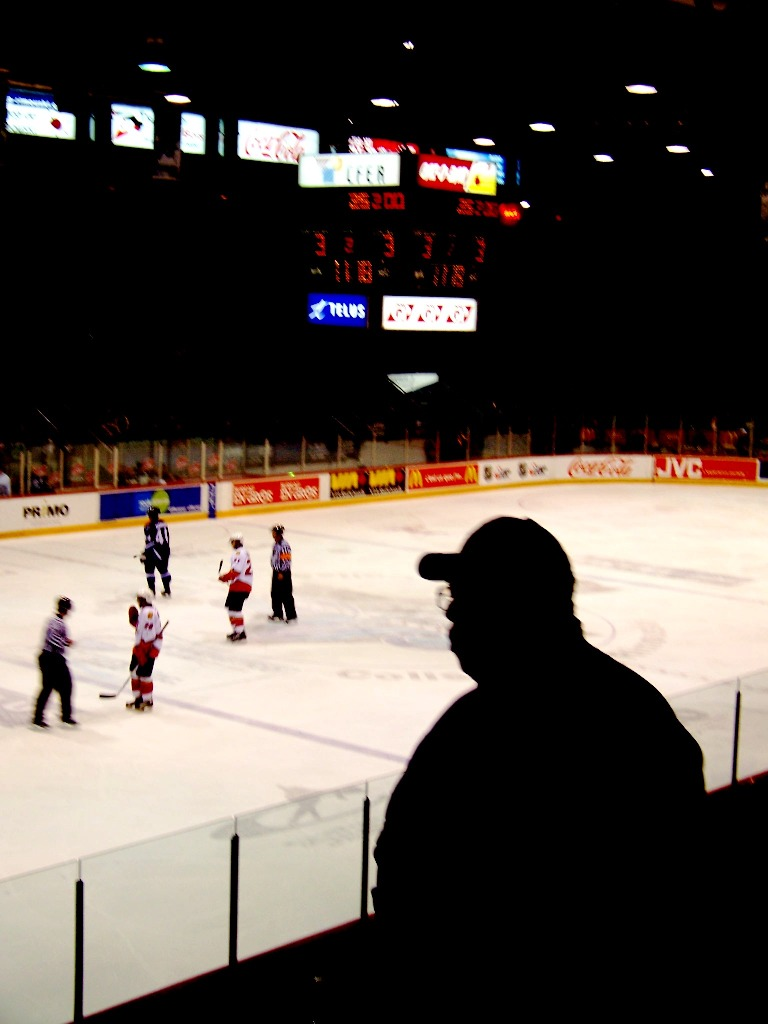
Fan
