= Steve Guenette =

Canadian ice hockey player

- Born: November 13, 1965 (age 59); Ottawa, Ontario, Canada
- Height: 5 ft 9 in (175 cm)
- Weight: 175 lb (79 kg; 12 st 7 lb)
- Position: Goaltender
- Caught: Left
- Played for: Pittsburgh Penguins; Calgary Flames
- NHL draft: Undrafted
- Playing career: 1986–1992

Steven P. Guenette (born November 13, 1965) is a Canadian former professional ice hockey goaltender who played 35 games in the National Hockey League for the Pittsburgh Penguins and Calgary Flames from 1987 to 1990. The rest of his career, which lasted from 1986 to 1992, was spent in the minor leagues.

== Playing career ==
Guenette signed with the Penguins in 1985 after two seasons in the Ontario Hockey League with the Guelph Platers. He remained in the OHL for one more season in 1985–86, where he led the Platers to the J. Ross Robertson Cup title, and then the 1986 Memorial Cup championship. Guenette won the Leo Lalonde Memorial Trophy as the OHL's top over-ager, as well as the Hap Emms Memorial Trophy as the top goaltender in the Memorial Cup, in addition to being named to the Memorial Cup All-Star team.

Guenette broke into the NHL the following year, playing two games with the Penguins in 1986–87. He played 30 more games in Pittsburgh over the next two seasons. Spending most of his time in the International Hockey League where he won the James Norris Memorial Trophy for allowing the fewest goals in the IHL and was named a second-team all-star after recording a 23–4–5 record for the Muskegon Lumberjacks in 1987–88.

The Penguins traded Guenette to the Calgary Flames in 1989 for a sixth round draft pick. He spent two seasons in the Flames organization, appearing in only three games for Calgary, and after a final season with the Kalamazoo Wings in 1991–92, retired from professional hockey.

== Career statistics ==
=== Regular season and playoffs ===
			Regular season									Playoffs
Season	Team	League	GP	W	L	T	MIN	GA	SO	GAA	SV%	GP	W	L	MIN	GA	SO	GAA	SV%
1981–82	Gloucester Rangers	CJHL	1	—	—	—	60	6	0	6.00	—	—	—	—	—	—	—	—	—
1982–83	Gloucester Rangers	CJHL	30	—	—	—	1546	124	0	4.81	—	—	—	—	—	—	—	—	—
1983–84	Guelph Platers	OHL	38	9	20	1	1808	155	0	5.14	—	—	—	—	—	—	—	—	—
1984–85	Guelph Platers	OHL	47	16	22	4	2593	200	1	4.63	—	—	—	—	—	—	—	—	—
1985–86	Guelph Platers	OHL	50	26	20	1	2910	165	3	3.40	.895	20	15	3	1167	54	1	2.77	—
1985–86	Guelph Platers	M-Cup	—	—	—	—	—	—	—	—	—	4	3	1	240	12	0	3.00	—
1986–87	Pittsburgh Penguins	NHL	2	0	2	0	112	8	0	4.30	.846	—	—	—	—	—	—	—	—
1986–87	Baltimore Skipjacks	AHL	54	21	23	0	3035	157	5	3.10	—	—	—	—	—	—	—	—	—
1987–88	Pittsburgh Penguins	NHL	19	12	7	0	1092	61	1	3.35	.895	—	—	—	—	—	—	—	—
1987–88	Muskegon Lumberjacks	IHL	33	23	4	5	1943	91	4	2.81	—	—	—	—	—	—	—	—	—
1988–89	Pittsburgh Penguins	NHL	11	5	6	0	574	41	0	4.29	.867	—	—	—	—	—	—	—	—
1988–89	Muskegon Lumberjacks	IHL	10	6	4	0	597	39	0	3.92	—	—	—	—	—	—	—	—	—
1988–89	Salt Lake Golden Eagles	IHL	30	24	5	0	1810	82	2	2.72	—	13	8	5	782	44	0	3.38	—
1989–90	Calgary Flames	NHL	2	1	1	0	120	8	0	4.02	.840	—	—	—	—	—	—	—	—
1989–90	Salt Lake Golden Eagles	IHL	47	22	21	4	2779	160	0	3.45	—	10	4	4	545	35	1	3.85	—
1990–91	Calgary Flames	NHL	1	1	0	0	60	4	0	4.00	.867	—	—	—	—	—	—	—	—
1990–91	Salt Lake Golden Eagles	IHL	43	26	13	4	2521	137	2	3.26	—	2	0	1	59	9	0	9.15	—
1991–92	Kalamazoo Wings	IHL	21	7	9	3	1094	70	1	3.84	—	—	—	—	—	—	—	—	—
NHL totals			35	19	16	0	1956	122	1	3.74	.881	—	—	—	—	—	—	—	—
