= 1986 Memorial Cup =

Canadian junior men's ice hockey championship

Tournament details
- Venue(s): Memorial Coliseum; Portland, Oregon
- Dates: May 10–17, 1986
- Teams: 4
- Host team: Portland Winter Hawks (WHL)

Final positions
- Champions: Guelph Platers (OHL) (1st title)

Tournament statistics
- Games played: 8

The Memorial Cup trophy

The 1986 Memorial Cup occurred May 10–17 at the Memorial Coliseum in Portland, Oregon. It was the 68th annual Memorial Cup competition and determined the major junior ice hockey champion of the Canadian Hockey League (CHL). Hosting rights were originally awarded to the Queen's Park Arena and the New Westminster Bruins, but staging the tournament alongside Expo '86 in Vancouver proved logistically impossible and so the tournament was moved to Portland for the second time in three years. Participating teams were the host team Portland Winter Hawks, as well as the winners of the Western Hockey League, Ontario Hockey League and Quebec Major Junior Hockey League which were the Kamloops Blazers, Guelph Platers and Hull Olympiques. The Platers won their first Memorial Cup, and the city's second Memorial Cup, defeating Hull in the final game.

== Teams ==
QMJHL Team OHL Team WHL Team Host Team

=== Guelph Platers ===
The Guelph Platers represented the Ontario Hockey League at the 1986 Memorial Cup. The Platers finished the regular season with a 41-23-2 record, earning 84 points and finishing in second place in the Emms Division. Guelph scored 297 goals during the regular season, ranking them in a tie for sixth place in the OHL. The Platers allowed 235 goals, which was the second fewest in the league. In the Emms Division quarter-finals, the Platers swept the Sudbury Wolves in four games. In the Emms Division semi-finals in which the Platers, Windsor Spitfires and North Bay Centennials participated in a round-robin style series, Guelph earned a 4-0 record, advancing to the Emms Division finals. In the Divisional finals, the Platers defeated the Windsor Spitfires in six games, advancing to the J. Ross Robertson Cup finals. In the final round, Guelph defeated the Belleville Bulls in six games, winning the OHL championship and representing the OHL at the 1986 Memorial Cup.

The Platers offense was led by Lonnie Loach, who scored 41 goals and 83 points in 65 games, leading the team in scoring. Mike Murray scored 28 goals and 65 points in 56 games for the Platers. During the season, the club acquired Gary Roberts from the Ottawa 67's, who would play a big part in Guelph's success. In 23 games with Guelph, Roberts, a Calgary Flames prospect, scored 18 goals and 33 points. In the post-season, Roberts led Guelph in scoring, as he scored 18 goals and 31 points in 20 games. Marc Tournier led the Platers on the blue line, scoring eight goals and 50 points in 58 games. Fellow defenseman Steve Chiasson scored 12 goals and 41 points in 54 games. In goal, the Platers were led by Steve Guenette, who posted a 26-20-1 record with a 3.40 GAA and a .895 save percentage in 50 games. Guenette was awarded the Leo Lalonde Memorial Trophy as the Overager of the Year in the OHL. Platers head coach Jacques Martin won the Matt Leyden Trophy as OHL Coach of the Year.

The 1986 Memorial Cup was the first time in team history that the Platers qualified for the tournament.

=== Hull Olympiques ===
The Hull Olympiques represented the Quebec Major Junior Hockey League at the 1986 Memorial Cup. The Olympiques were the best team in the QMJHL during the 1985–86 season, earning a record of 54-18-0, as they accumulated 108 points. The team won the Jean Rougeau Trophy for their accomplishment. Hull scored a league high 423 goals, while they allowed a league low 262 goals. In the QMJHL quarter-finals, the Olympiques swept the Shawinigan Cataractes in five games. Hull stayed red hot in the QMJHL semi-finals, sweeping the Saint-Jean Castors in five games to extend their playoff winning streak to ten games. In the President's Cup finals against the Drummondville Voltigeurs, the Olympiques swept the Voltigeurs, going a perfect 15-0 in the post-season, winning the championship, and earning a berth into the 1986 Memorial Cup.

The Olympiques offense was led by Guy Rouleau and Luc Robitaille. Rouleau was awarded the Jean Beliveau Trophy after he led the league in scoring with 91 goals and 191 points in 61 games with Hull, after being acquired by the club from the Longueuil Chevaliers very early in the season. Rouleau also was awarded the Michel Briere Memorial Trophy as the Most Valuable Player in the QMJHL. Robitaille also scored 191 points during the regular season, as he scored 68 goals and 123 assists in 63 games. Robitaille led the club in post-season scoring, as he had 17 goals and 44 points in 15 games, while Rouleau scored 23 goals and 43 points in 15 playoff games. Joe Foglietta scored 39 goals and 117 points in 59 games. On defense, Stephane Richer led the club with 14 goals and 66 points in 71 games. The Olympiques defense received a big boost when Sylvain Cote was sent to the club by the Hartford Whalers midway through the season. Cote spent the entire 1984–85 season with the Whalers in the NHL and began the 1985–86 with the club. In 26 games with Hull, Cote scored 10 goals and 43 points. In the post-season, Cote scored six goals and 34 points in 13 games. Cote and Robitaille would share the Guy Lafleur Trophy as the QMJHL Playoff MVP. Cote also was awarded the Emile Bouchard Trophy as QMJHL Defenseman of the Year. In goal, Robert Desjardins saw the majority of action. In 42 games, Desjardins earned a record of 29-12-0 with a 3.32 GAA, as he won the Jacques Plante Memorial Trophy for having the lowest goals against average in the QMJHL. His backup was Eric Bohemier, who had a 25-6-0 record with a 3.95 GAA in 32 games.

The 1986 Memorial Cup was the first time in club history that the Olympiques qualified for the tournament.

=== Kamloops Blazers ===
The Kamloops Blazers represented the Western Hockey League at the 1986 Memorial Cup. The Blazers were the top team in the West Division during the 1985–86 season, earning a record of 49-19-4, which gave the club 102 points. Kamloops was the highest scoring team in the WHL, scoring 449 goals. Defensively, the Blazers ranked fourth, as they allowed 299 goals. In the West Division semi-finals, the Blazers swept the Seattle Thunderbirds in five games. In the West Division finals, Kamloops had little trouble defeating the Portland Winter Hawks, as they won the best-of-nine series in six games, advancing to the Ed Chynowth Cup finals. In the final round, Kamloops defeated the top ranked Medicine Hat Tigers in five games, winning the WHL championship, and earning a berth into the 1986 Memorial Cup.

Kamloops offense was led by Rob Brown, who scored 58 goals and 173 points in 69 games to lead the league in scoring, winning the Bob Clarke Trophy. Brown was awarded the Most Valuable Player Award for the West Division. In the post-season, Brown scored 18 goals and 46 points in 16 games, leading the Blazers in playoff scoring. Mike Nottingham scored 61 goals and 131 points in 70 games, finishing eight in WHL scoring. Ken Morrison was acquired by the Blazers from the Prince Albert Raiders early in the season. In 57 games with Kamloops, Morrison scored 69 goals and 123 points. Overall, Morrison scored a league high 83 goals for both the Raiders and Blazers during the season. Morrison was named the Most Sportsmanlike Player in the WHL. Greg Evtushevski returned to Kamloops during the season after beginning the year with the Maine Mariners of the American Hockey League. In 34 games with Kamloops, Evtushevski scored 29 goals and 76 points. On defense, Greg Hawgood scored 34 goals and 119 points in 71 games, leading the blue line in scoring. Ron Shudra scored 10 goals and 50 points in 72 games, and was named a co-winner of the Jim Piggott Memorial Trophy as WHL Rookie of the Year. In goal, Rob McKinley was the Blazers starting goaltender, as in 54 games, he posted a GAA of 3.92.

This was the second time that the club had qualified for the Memorial Cup since relocating to Kamloops in 1981. The Kamloops Junior Oilers lost in the semi-finals at the 1984 Memorial Cup. Previously, the club was known as the New Westminster Bruins, who qualified for four consecutive Memorial Cups in 1975, 1976, 1977 and 1978. The Bruins won the Memorial Cup in 1977 and 1978.

=== Portland Winter Hawks ===
The Portland Winter Hawks of the Western Hockey League was the host team of the 1986 Memorial Cup. The Winter Hawks had a very solid regular season, earning a record of 47-24-1 for 95 points, and finishing in second place in the West Division. Portland was a high scoring team, scoring 438 goals, which ranked second in the WHL. Defensively, the Winter Hawks allowed 348 goals against, which ranked them in fifth place in the league. In the post-season, the Winter Hawks narrowly defeated the Spokane Chiefs in nine games during the West Division semi-final. In the West Division final, the Winter Hawks were eliminated from the playoffs by the top team in the West Division, the Kamloops Blazers, in six games.

The Winter Hawks offense was led by Ray Podloski, who led the club in scoring with 59 goals and 134 points in 66 games. Podloski finished in seventh place in WHL scoring. Dave Waldie scored a team high 68 goals, while earning 126 points in 72 games. Waldie was named a co-winner of the Jim Piggott Memorial Trophy as the WHL Rookie of the Year. Waldie led the Winter Hawks in post-season scoring, as he had 13 goals and 19 points in 15 games. Dan Woodley emerged as a top prospect for the 1986 NHL entry draft, as he scored 45 goals and 92 points in 62 games with Portland. On defense, Glen Wesley was the Winter Hawks leader, as he scored 16 goals and 91 points in 69 games. Wesley was named the West Division winner of the Bill Hunter Trophy as the Best Defenseman in the WHL. Wesley was emerging as a top prospect for the 1987 NHL entry draft during this season. Goaltending duties were split between Lance Carlson, who posted a 4.48 GAA in 40 games, and Chris Eisenhart, who had a 4.82 GAA in 36 games.

The 1986 Memorial Cup was the third appearance by Portland in team history. At the 1982 Memorial Cup, Portland finished in third place, while at the 1983 Memorial Cup, the Winter Hawks won the Memorial Cup for the first time in club history.

== Round-robin standings ==
Pos	Team	Pld	W	L	GF	GA	
1	Guelph Platers (OHL)	3	2	1	12	10	Advanced directly to the championship game
2	Hull Olympiques (QMJHL)	3	2	1	13	12	Advanced to the semifinal game
3	Kamloops Blazers (WHL)	3	1	2	13	15	Advanced to the semifinal game
4	Portland Winter Hawks (WHL Host)	3	1	2	16	17	Advanced to the tiebreaker

== Scores ==
Round-robin

- May 10 Guelph 5-3 Kamloops
- May 10 Hull 7-5 Portland
- May 11 Portland 6-4 Guelph
- May 11 Hull 5-4 Kamloops (OT)
- May 12 Guelph 3-1 Hull
- May 14 Kamloops 6-5 Portland

Tie-Breaker

- May 15 Kamloops 8-1 Portland

Semi-final

- May 16 Hull 9-3 Kamloops

Final

- May 17 Guelph 6-2 Hull

=== Winning roster ===
1985-86 Guelph Platers
Goaltenders: – Steve Guenette; – Andy Helmuth	Defencemen: – Steve Chiasson; – Brian Hayton; – Kerry Huffman; – Denis Larocque; – Bill Loshaw; – Allan MacIsaac; – Luc Sabourin; – Marc Tournier	Wingers: – Luciano Fagioli; – Robb Graham; – Paul Kelly; – Lonnie Loach; – Jamie McKinley; – Keith Miller; – Gary Roberts - C	Centres: – Rob Arabski; – Paul Brydges; – John McIntyre; – Mike Murray; – Tom Nickolau; Coach: Jacques Martin; General Manager: Robert Holody

== Award winners ==
- Stafford Smythe Memorial Trophy (MVP): Steve Chiasson, Guelph
- George Parsons Trophy (Sportsmanship): Kerry Huffman, Guelph
- Hap Emms Memorial Trophy (Goaltender): Steve Guenette, Guelph

All-star team

- Goal: Steve Guenette, Guelph
- Defence: Steve Chiasson, Guelph; Ron Shudra, Kamloops
- Centre: Guy Rouleau, Hull
- Left wing: Luc Robitaille, Hull
- Right wing: Bob Foglietta, Portland
