= Guy Rouleau (ice hockey) =

Canadian ice hockey player

- Born: April 16, 1965 Beloeil, Quebec, Canada
- Died: December 7, 2008 (aged 43)
- Height: 5 ft 9 in (175 cm)
- Weight: 174 lb (79 kg; 12 st 6 lb)
- Position: Centre
- Shot: Left
- Played for: AHL; Sherbrooke Canadiens; Springfield Indians; ECHL; Erie Panthers; IHL; Peoria Rivermen
- NHL draft: Undrafted
- Playing career: 1986–1998

Guy Rouleau (April 16, 1965 – December 7, 2008) was a Canadian ice hockey player.

== Early life ==
Rouleau was born in Beloeil, Quebec. He won the Michel Brière Memorial Trophy as the most valuable player in the Quebec Major Junior Hockey League for his play with the Hull Olympiques during the 1985–86 QMJHL season.

== Career ==
Rouleau was not drafted in the NHL entry draft and never played in the National Hockey League. He played three seasons in the American league with the Sherbrooke Canadiens (1986–88) and the Springfield Falcons (1989–90). He also played for various minor league teams until 1998. Rouleau also played for the Montreal Roadrunners (1994–97) and Ottawa Loggers (only two games) in the now defunct inline hockey league Roller Hockey International. At the 1986 Memorial Cup, Rouleau tied Jeff Larmer's record for points in a Memorial Cup with 16.

== Personal life ==
Rouleau died from complications related to a brain tumor on December 7, 2008.

== Career statistics ==
			Regular season					Playoffs
Season	Team	League	GP	G	A	Pts	PIM	GP	G	A	Pts	PIM
1980–81	Bourassa Angevins	QMAAA	2	0	0	0	0	—	—	—	—	—
1981–82	Bourassa Angevins	QMAAA	48	49	66	115	—	5	5	7	12	—
1982–83	Longueuil Chevaliers	QMJHL	68	25	31	56	23	15	3	4	7	13
1983–84	Longueuil Chevaliers	QMJHL	70	60	73	133	30	17	9	20	29	42
1984–85	Longueuil Chevaliers	QMJHL	70	76	87	163	66	—	—	—	—	—
1985–86	Longueuil Chevaliers	QMJHL	1	0	0	0	2	—	—	—	—	—
1985–86	Hull Olympiques	QMJHL	61	91	100	191	70	15	23	20	43	21
1985–86	Hull Olympiques	MC	—	—	—	—	—	5	7	9	16	—
1986–87	Zürcher SC	CHE II	13	10	13	23	10	—	—	—	—	—
1986–87	Sherbrooke Canadiens	AHL	10	4	3	7	2	2	0	0	0	0
1987–88	Sherbrooke Canadiens	AHL	76	26	47	73	42	4	0	1	1	2
1989–90	Erie Panthers	ECHL	13	9	10	19	9	—	—	—	—	—
1989–90	Springfield Indians	AHL	52	18	26	44	14	18	9	9	18	20
1990–91	SC Langnau	CHE II	2	1	3	4	2	—	—	—	—	—
1991–92	ECD Sauerland	DEU II	25	37	28	65	25	—	—	—	—	—
1992–93	HC Fiemme Cavalese	ITA	16	15	16	31	8	—	—	—	—	—
1993–94	Peoria Rivermen	IHL	6	0	2	2	0	—	—	—	—	—
1994–95	EHC Trier	DEU II	42	37	55	92	108	—	—	—	—	—
1995–96	EHC Trier	DEU II	46	46	62	108	40	—	—	—	—	—
1996–97	EHC Trier	DEU II	47	33	50	83	74	—	—	—	—	—
1997–98	Reno Rage	WCHL	12	5	7	12	4	—	—	—	—	—
AHL totals			138	48	76	124	58	24	9	10	19	22
DEU II totals			160	153	195	348	247	—	—	—	—	—
