= Sidney Crosby =

Canadian ice hockey player (born 1987)

OC ONS Sidney Crosby
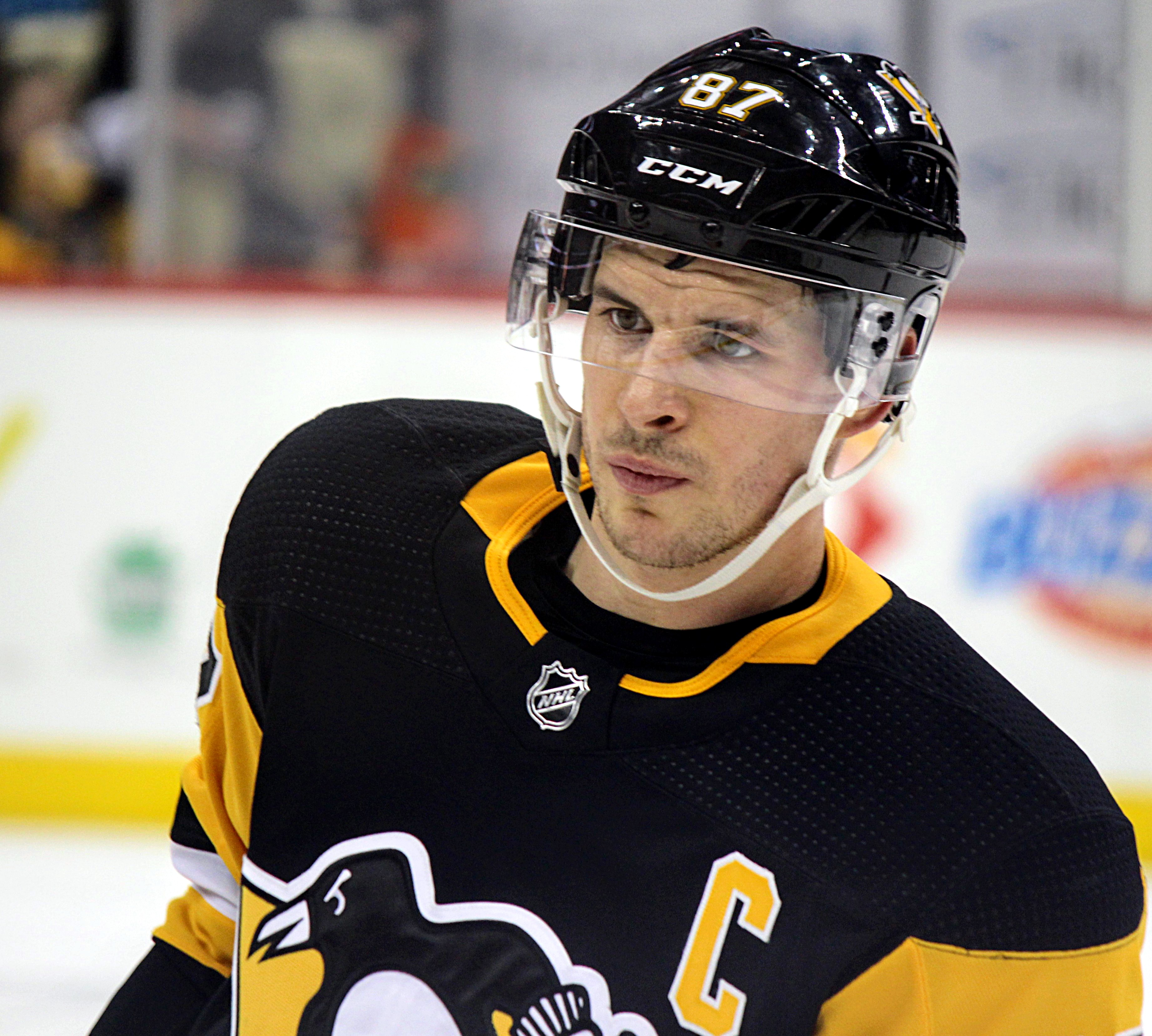
- Crosby with the Pittsburgh Penguins in January 2019
- Born: August 7, 1987 (age 39) Halifax, Nova Scotia, Canada
- Height: 5 ft 11 in (180 cm)
- Weight: 200 lb (91 kg; 14 st 4 lb)
- Position: Centre
- Shoots: Left
- NHL team: Pittsburgh Penguins
- National team: Canada
- NHL draft: 1st overall, 2005; Pittsburgh Penguins
- Playing career: 2005–present

Sidney Patrick Crosby OC ONS (born August 7, 1987) is a Canadian professional ice hockey player who is a centre and captain for the Pittsburgh Penguins of the National Hockey League (NHL). Nicknamed "Sid the Kid" and dubbed "The Next One", he was selected first overall by the Penguins in the 2005 NHL entry draft. Born and raised in Halifax, Crosby was one of the most lauded prospects in ice hockey history and is widely regarded as one of the greatest ice hockey players of all time.

During his two-year major junior career with the Rimouski Océanic, he earned many awards and led his club to the 2005 Memorial Cup final. Océanic and the Quebec Major Junior Hockey League retired Crosby's jersey number 87 in 2019, and the QMJHL began presenting their Rookie of the Year award as the “Sidney Crosby Trophy” in 2025. Crosby debuted in the NHL during the 2005–06 season, recording 102 points and finishing as runner-up for the Calder Memorial Trophy as the NHL Rookie of the Year. At 18 years and 253 days, he is the youngest player to date to reach 100 points in an NHL season. By his second season, he led the NHL with 120 points to capture the Art Ross Trophy, becoming the youngest player and the only teenager to win a scoring title in any major North American sports league. That same season, Crosby won the Hart Memorial Trophy as the league's most valuable player (MVP) and the Lester B. Pearson Award for most outstanding player as judged by his peers. He started the 2007–08 season with the team's captaincy and subsequently led them to the 2008 Stanley Cup Final, where they were defeated by the Detroit Red Wings in six games. The Penguins returned to the Finals against Detroit the following year and won in seven games; Crosby became the youngest captain in NHL history to win the Stanley Cup. Crosby also led Pittsburgh to Stanley Cup championships in 2016 and 2017, becoming the third player to win the Conn Smythe Trophy (playoff MVP) in consecutive years.

In 2009–10, he received the Mark Messier Leadership Award and scored 51 goals, winning the Maurice Richard Trophy as the NHL's leading goal scorer, was also the runner-up for the Art Ross Trophy and a finalist for the Hart Memorial Trophy. In early 2011, Crosby sustained a concussion that left him sidelined for the rest of the season and for most of the 2011–12 campaign. In 2013, Crosby won his second career Ted Lindsay Award and was a finalist for the Hart Memorial Trophy the same season. In 2014, Crosby again won the Hart Memorial Trophy as well as his second career Art Ross Trophy (104 points) and his second consecutive Ted Lindsay Award and third altogether while also being a finalist for the award in 2010 and 2021. In 2017, he won his second Richard Trophy and was named one of the 100 Greatest NHL Players in history.

Internationally, Crosby has represented Canada on numerous occasions. He won gold at the 2005 World Junior Championships, and was later named to Team Canada for the 2010 Winter Olympics in Vancouver. Playing against the United States in the gold medal game, he scored the game-winning goal in overtime. Crosby captained Team Canada at the 2014 Winter Olympics, winning his second consecutive Olympic gold medal. A year later, he led his country to gold in the World Championship in Prague, thus becoming a member of the Triple Gold Club and the only player in the club to have captained all three winning teams. In 2016, Crosby captained Canada to gold in the World Cup of Hockey and was elected MVP by a unanimous vote. In 2025, Crosby captained Canada to a championship win in the inaugural 4 Nations Face-Off, and a silver medal at the 2026 Winter Olympics.

== Early life ==
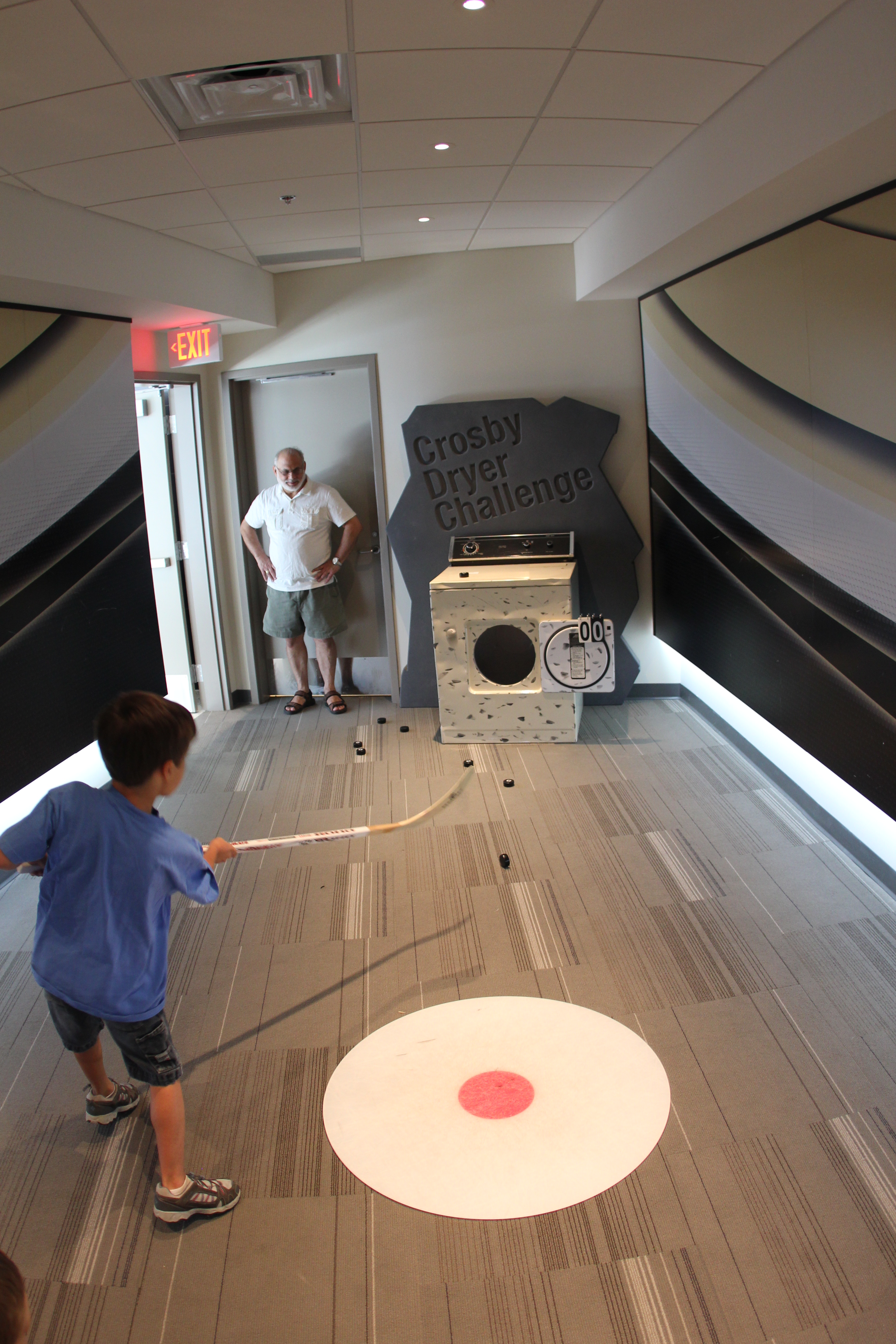
A recreation of Crosby's childhood dryer that was behind the net, used as shooting target practice, at PPG Paints Arena

Crosby was born in the Grace Maternity Hospital in Halifax, Nova Scotia, on August 7, 1987, to Troy and Trina (née Forbes) Crosby. Crosby's jersey number (87) and 2007 contract signing ($8.7 million per year) reflect his birthdate (8/7/87). Crosby grew up in nearby Cole Harbour and has a younger sister named Taylor. His father Troy was a goaltender who played for the Verdun Junior Canadiens in the Quebec Major Junior Hockey League (QMJHL). He helped the team win the 1985 President's Cup which led them to the 1985 Memorial Cup. Troy was drafted 240th overall by the Montreal Canadiens in 1984, was invited to training camps, but never played at the NHL level. Growing up, Crosby admired Steve Yzerman and, like his father, was a Canadiens fan. Crosby began playing hockey by himself in his basement at the age of two, shooting pucks in a net that had the family dryer behind it, leading to a longstanding misconception that he was actually practising with the dryer; he learned to skate at age three.

From age 12 to 15, Crosby attended Astral Drive Junior High School. He was a straight-A student and, according to the vice-principal, "an amazing role model, who was really kind to students in the learning centre and to special needs kids". At age 15, Crosby transferred to Shattuck-Saint Mary's in Faribault, Minnesota to play with the school's hockey program. While playing for the Rimouski Océanic of the then-QMJHL, Crosby went to Harrison Trimble High School in Moncton, New Brunswick, where he graduated in 2005.

== Playing career ==
=== Minor hockey ===
Early in his minor hockey years, Crosby began attracting media attention for his play and gave his first newspaper interview at age seven. When Crosby was 13, Nova Scotia's Minor Hockey Council refused to allow him to play midget, a level of minor hockey designated for 15- to 17-year-olds. His family sued but lost. The following year, he entered the midget level with the triple-A Dartmouth Subways and went on to score a combined 217 regular season and playoff points, leading Dartmouth to a second-place finish at the 2002 Air Canada Cup. He was named the MVP and Top Scorer awards at the national tournament at the tournament banquet held after the preliminary round and he finished the tournament with 24 points (11 goals and 13 assists) in 7 games. Crosby was called up as a 14-year-old to play two games with the Maritime Junior A Hockey League's Truro Bearcats that season. Crosby had been drafted by the Bearcats in the 2001 MJAHL Draft as a 13-year-old.

During his midget season, Crosby appeared on the CBC's Hockey Day in Canada telecast. He has recalled numerous instances in which opposing players intentionally attempted to injure him, as well as constant verbal abuse from parents on and off the ice. Parents taunted and threatened Crosby so harshly, he took to not wearing his jersey between tournament games while he waited to play so that he would not be recognized. Due to this treatment, he elected to play for the American hockey program at Shattuck-Saint Mary's Boarding School, Minnesota for the 2002–03 hockey season. In 57 games with the Sabres, he recorded 72 goals and 162 points, leading the team to a U18 AAA national championship.

=== Junior career ===
==== Rimouski Océanic (2003–2005) ====
Crosby was selected first overall in the 2003 Midget Draft by the Rimouski Océanic of the Quebec Major Junior Hockey League (QMJHL). In his first exhibition game, he scored eight points, leading his teammates to nickname him "Darryl" (in reference to Darryl Sittler's ten-point NHL game in 1976). In his first regular season game in the QMJHL, he scored one goal and added two assists. He was named QMJHL Player of the Week for two consecutive weeks at the start of the season and won the honour four more times as the season progressed. He was named QMJHL Player of the Month and Canadian Hockey League (CHL) Player of the Week three times each. Crosby finished his rookie QMJHL season with 54 goals and 81 assists over 59 games to capture the Jean Béliveau Trophy as the league's leading point-scorer. He was further recognized with the RDS/JVC Trophy (overall rookie of the year) and Michel Brière Memorial Trophy (most valuable player), becoming the first QMJHL player to win all three major awards at once. Rounding out Crosby's accolades for the 2003–04 regular season were QMJHL All-Rookie and first All-Star team honours, as well as Offensive Rookie, Offensive Player and Personality of the Year Awards. As a team, the Océanic led the Eastern Division with 34 wins and 76 points. After receiving a first-round bye in the 2003 QMJHL playoffs, they defeated the Shawinigan Cataractes in the quarterfinals, then were eliminated by the Moncton Wildcats in the semifinals. Crosby recorded 16 points (7 goals and 9 assists) over 9 playoff games.

During the off-season, the World Hockey Association, a major professional league proposed to rival the NHL, held an entry draft on July 17, 2004. Holding the first overall selection, Toronto chose Crosby. The following month, it was reported that Crosby turned down a US$7.5 million contract over three years to play for Hamilton. Crosby told reporters that while "it took a lot to say no to that much money", he "work[ed] hard most of his life to play in the NHL". The contract would have paid him US$2.5 million annually and an additional US$2 million payout regardless of whether the WHA was realized as a legitimate league or not. However, it was not clarified how Hamilton could have signed Crosby, as Toronto held his WHA playing rights. Nevertheless, the WHA never materialized.

Returning to the Océanic for the 2004–05 season, Crosby continued dominating the league, leading the league with 66 goals, 102 assists and 168 points over 62 games to capture his second consecutive Beliveau Trophy. Joining Crosby on Rimouski's top line were wingers Dany Roussin and Marc-Antoine Pouliot, who finished second and third in league-scoring with 116 and 114 points respectively. In addition to his scoring title, Crosby was once again awarded Most Valuable Player, Offensive Player and Personality of the Year, while repeating as a QMJHL First All-Star. The Océanic finished the regular season with the best record in the league, registering 45 wins and 98 points, including a league record-setting 28-game undefeated streak. They went on to capture the President's Cup as QMJHL playoff champions, defeating the Halifax Mooseheads in the finals. Crosby led the playoffs with 31 points (14 goals and 17 assists) over 13 games, earning him the Guy Lafleur Trophy as postseason MVP. With their QMJHL championship, the Océanic qualified for the 2005 Memorial Cup, Canada's national major junior tournament. Meeting the London Knights in the final, the Océanic were shut-out 4–0. Despite the loss, Crosby was named to the Tournament All-Star team and captured the Ed Chynoweth Trophy as the competition's leading scorer with 11 points (six goals and five assists) over five games. Knights forward Corey Perry was awarded the Stafford Smythe Memorial Trophy as the MVP. Soon after, he attended the NHL prospect combine in preparation for the 2005 NHL entry draft.

The Rimouski Océanic retired jersey number 87 in Crosby's honor in September 2019, and the QMJHL also retired the number for all of its teams.

=== Pittsburgh Penguins (2005–present) ===
==== Rise to superstardom (2005–2007) ====
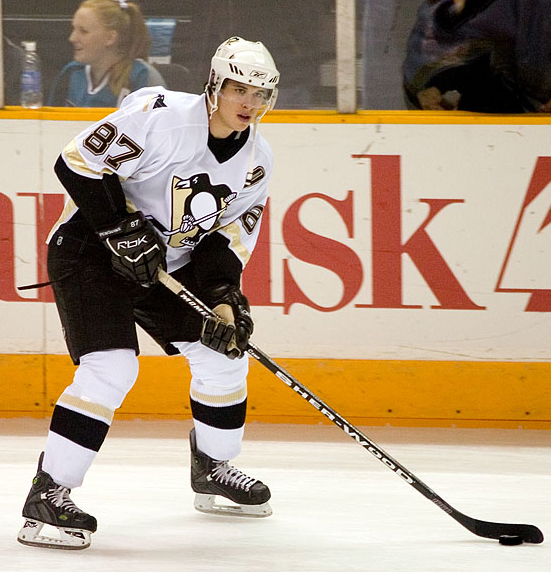
Crosby in November 2006, after being designated an alternate captain

Entering the 2005 NHL entry draft, Crosby was listed first overall in the NHL Central Scouting Bureau and International Scouting Services' respective rankings of prospects. (Note: The NHL Central Scouting Bureau divide their rankings by position (goaltenders and skaters) and playing region (North American and Europe). Accordingly, Crosby was ranked as the best North American skater.) He also won the Mike Bossy Trophy as the QMJHL's best prospect. Crosby was selected first overall in the draft by the Pittsburgh Penguins on July 30, 2005. Due to the labour lockout that suspended the entire 2004–05 NHL season, positioning for the 2005 draft was conducted via a weighted lottery based on each team's playoff appearances and draft lottery victories in the last four years. This lottery system led to the draft being popularly referred to as the "Sidney Crosby Lottery" or the "Sidney Crosby Sweepstakes".

"Sid the Kid", a nickname given to him by the media early in his career, made his NHL debut on October 5, 2005, against the New Jersey Devils, and registered an assist on the team's first goal of the season, scored by Mark Recchi in a 5–1 loss. He scored his first NHL goal in the Penguins' home opener on October 8 against goaltender Hannu Toivonen of the Boston Bruins. Despite having registered two assists for a three-point night, the Penguins were defeated 7–6 in overtime. Crosby began his rookie season playing alongside Hall of Famer Mario Lemieux, though Lemieux was forced to retire due to an irregular heartbeat after having played just 26 games into the season. Near the midway point of the season, Penguins head coach Ed Olczyk was fired. While the Penguins had started the season with a disappointing 8–17–6 record, Olczyk has stated in press reports that he felt that his attempts to protect Crosby and other rookies on the Penguins from team hazing also contributed to his dismissal as coach.

Olczyk was replaced as head coach by Michel Therrien on December 15, 2005. The following day, Therrien designated Crosby as an alternate captain for the Penguins. The move drew criticism from some hockey pundits, including commentator Don Cherry, who claimed that Crosby did not have the experience for the position. Cherry said, "An 18-year-old kid says he's going to give us ideas. What, from the Quebec League, he's going to give them ideas? Come on. That's ridiculous." Although hopes were high in Pittsburgh for the club to succeed, largely in part to the beginning of Crosby's NHL career and bolstered by the acquisitions of Sergei Gonchar, Žigmund Pálffy, and Mark Recchi, the Penguins still finished with the worst record in the Eastern Conference with only 22 wins and 58 points, just one point better than St. Louis Blues in the Western Conference.

Nevertheless, Crosby's first NHL campaign was a personal success as he established franchise records in assists (63) and points (102) for a rookie, both of which were previously held by Mario Lemieux. He also scored 39 goals and became the youngest player in NHL history to score 100 points in a single season, and only the seventh rookie ever to hit the benchmark. Overall, Crosby finished sixth in the NHL scoring race and seventh in the NHL in assists. Among Canadian NHL players, he trailed only Joe Thornton and Dany Heatley. Throughout the season, Crosby had battled with Washington Capitals winger and 2004 first-overall pick Alexander Ovechkin for the rookie scoring lead. He finished second to Ovechkin's 106 points and also lost to the Capitals forward for the Calder Memorial Trophy as NHL rookie of the year. It marked the start of a rivalry that would help "define the league" for over a decade. Throughout his first season, Crosby was accused by opposing players and coaches of taking dives and complaining to officials, which was typically attributed to his youth. He became the first rookie to earn 100 penalty minutes and 100 points in the same season, which magnified his reputation for complaining to NHL officials. Hockey analyst Kelly Hrudey compared Crosby to Wayne Gretzky, who had a similar reputation as a "whiner" in his youth, and suggested that as Crosby matured, he would mellow out and his reputation would fade.

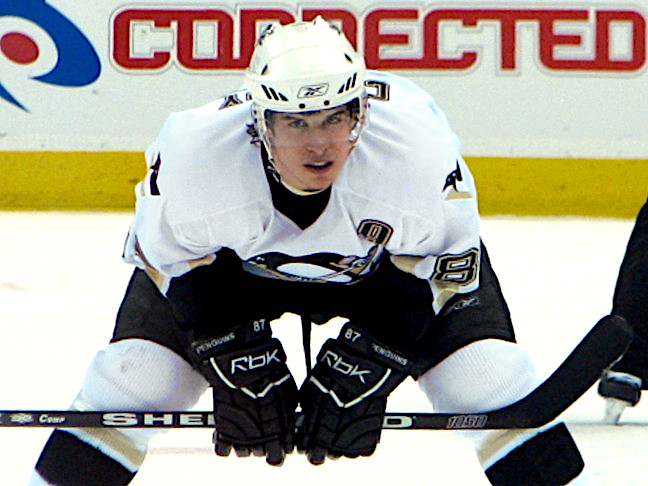
Crosby in April 2007 during the 2007 Stanley Cup playoffs

In his second NHL season, Crosby built on his rookie success. On October 28, 2006, Crosby scored his first NHL hat-trick in an 8–2 victory over the Philadelphia Flyers. His success against the Flyers continued as just over six weeks later, on December 13, he recorded the first six-point game of his career (one goal and five assists). The multi-point effort vaulted Crosby into the NHL scoring lead, which he would retain for the remainder of the season. He finished the 2006–07 with 36 goals and 84 assists for 120 points in 79 games to become the first teenager to lead the NHL in scoring since Wayne Gretzky in 1980. Being only 19 years old at the time, he became the youngest player in NHL history to win the Art Ross Trophy and the youngest scoring champion in any major North American professional sport. Crosby's second NHL season also saw significant improvements for the Penguins franchise as a whole, as the emergence of rookie forwards, eventual Calder Trophy-winner Evgeni Malkin and runner-up Jordan Staal complemented the club's offence. As a result, the Penguins jumped from last place in the Eastern Conference the previous season to fifth for the club's first playoff appearance since 2001. Playing the Ottawa Senators in the opening round, Crosby scored a goal in his Stanley Cup playoff debut in a 6–3 loss. He finished the series with five points in all five games as the Penguins were ousted in a 4–1 by the eventual Stanley Cup runner-up.

==== Beginning of Penguins captaincy, runner–up and first Stanley Cup title (2007–2009) ====
Crosby was named Pittsburgh's team captain on May 31, 2007, making him (at 19 years, 9 months, and 24 days) the youngest team captain in NHL history. During the season, the Penguins offered him the captaincy, but he turned it down. In the press conference naming him the team captain, he explained:

"I just thought it wasn't right for me. As a team, we were playing great and you don't want to disrupt things like that. Individually, I was not ready to accept that responsibility quite yet. Going through the playoffs and having that experience has probably given me more confidence. I understand there is going to be a lot more responsibility on my shoulders with this, but it's something I'm ready for, I feel very comfortable with it and I'm just excited to get things going."

At the NHL's annual awards show two weeks later in June 2007, Crosby completed a rare off-season "hat-trick", winning the Hart Memorial Trophy and the Lester B. Pearson Award in addition to his previously clinched Art Ross Trophy. He became the youngest player in NHL history to win the Lester B. Pearson, and only the second youngest player ever to win the Hart (after Gretzky). He became the youngest player ever to be named to the NHL's first All-Star team. With Crosby's initial three-year, entry-level contract set to expire at the end of the following season, the Penguins signed him to a five-year, $43.5 million contract extension on July 10, 2007, ensuring his stay with the Penguins through the 2012–13 season. Midway through the subsequent season, Crosby recorded a Gordie Howe hat-trick on December 20 in a game against the Boston Bruins. His first assist came 55 seconds into the first period. At 8:26 of the same period, Crosby scored to give the Penguins a 2–0 lead. Then, five minutes and nine seconds into the second frame, Crosby fought ex-Penguin defenceman Andrew Ference to complete the hat-trick. This was Crosby's first NHL fight. In the NHL's first Winter Classic (with a record crowd of 71,217 fans in attendance), Crosby scored the shootout winner in heavy snowfall to defeat the Buffalo Sabres.

However, two and a half weeks later, on January 18, 2008, Crosby suffered a high ankle sprain crashing leg-first into the boards in a game against the Tampa Bay Lightning. As a result, he missed the 2008 All-Star Game, to which he was named a starter. After missing 21 games, he returned on March 4 against the Tampa Bay Lightning and earned an assist on a Max Talbot goal. However, two games after his return, he felt his ankle was not up to shape and decided that he needed more time for it to heal. Crosby consequently sat out of the Penguins' next seven games and returned on March 27, 2008, to help the Penguins defeat the New York Islanders 3–1. Despite his injury-shortened campaign, Crosby still managed 72 points (24 goals, 48 assists) in just 53 games. Crosby's absence from the Penguins' line-up served as a stepping stone for teammate Evgeni Malkin, who, now in his second season, was developing into a superstar in his own right. Picking up the offensive slack, Malkin finished second in league scoring to Washington Capitals winger Alexander Ovechkin and was also a Hart Memorial Trophy nominee as MVP honours also went to Ovechkin. In addition to Crosby's return to the line-up late in the season, the Penguins acquired star winger Marián Hossa from the Atlanta Thrashers at the trade deadline, placing the club in a strong position to make a deep playoff run. Pittsburgh finished the season as Atlantic Division champions and just two points shy of the first-seeded Montreal Canadiens. In a rematch of the previous year's opening round, the Penguins began the 2008 playoffs facing the Ottawa Senators, whom they quickly swept in four games. After then defeating the New York Rangers and archrival Philadelphia Flyers, each in five games, the Penguins reached the final round for the first time since 1992, to face the Detroit Red Wings. After being shut-out as a team for the first two games of the series, Crosby scored the first two goals of game three as the series shifted to Pittsburgh to fuel a 3–2 win. The Penguins lost the next game and despite staving off defeat in game five, they were overcome by the Red Wings in six games. Crosby finished the playoffs with 27 points (six goals and 21 assists in all 20 games), tying forward and Conn Smythe-winner Henrik Zetterberg (13 goals and 14 assists in 22 games) for the playoff scoring lead.

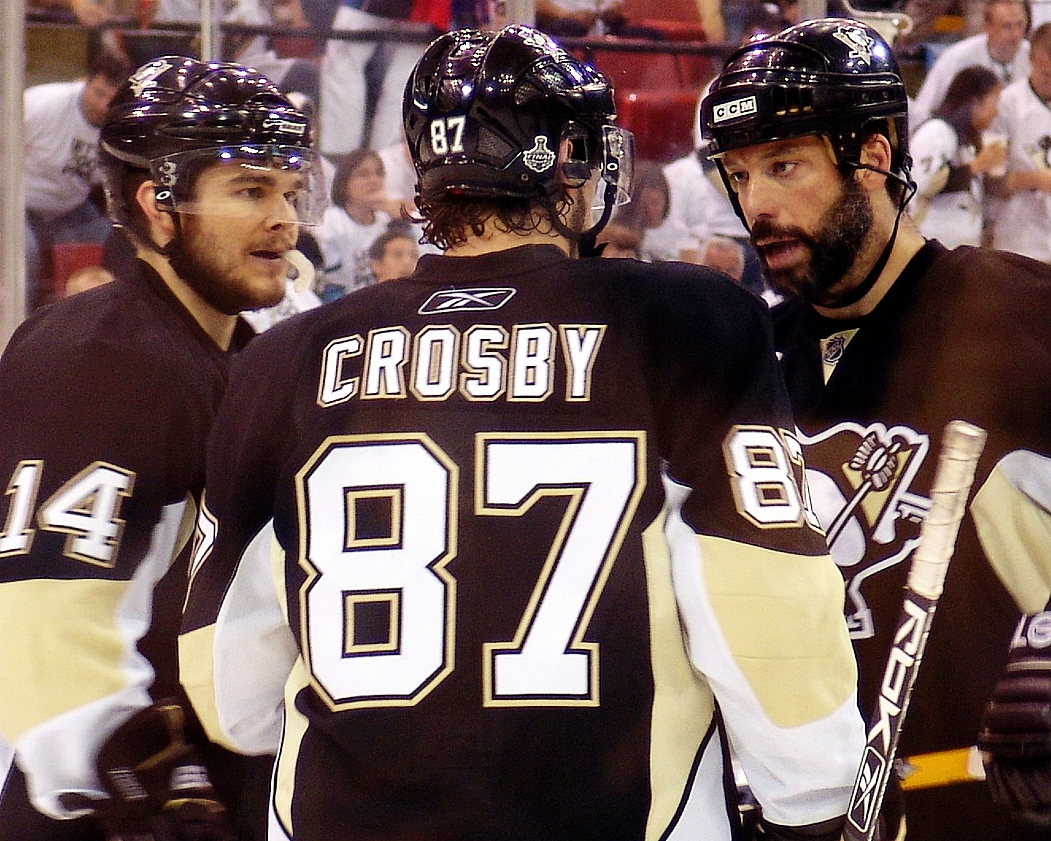
Crosby (centre) with Chris Kunitz and Bill Guerin in game six of the 2009 Stanley Cup Final

Early in the following season, on October 18, 2008, Crosby scored one goal and three assists against the Toronto Maple Leafs to surpass benchmarks of 100 goals, 200 assists, and 300 points for his career. On the play in which Crosby scored, teammate Evgeni Malkin assisted to record his own 200th point. As a result, Crosby had a team trainer cut the puck in half so both players could commemorate the achievement. Minor injury troubles kept Crosby from five games early in the season as he was listed day-to-day, but he was, for the most part, able to bounce back from the previous injury-riddled season and stay healthy. He recorded 33 goals and 70 assists for 103 points to finish third in league scoring, as Evgeni Malkin captured his first career Art Ross Trophy. Entering the 2009 playoffs as the defending Prince of Wales Trophy winners, the Penguins defeated the Philadelphia Flyers in the opening round before meeting the Washington Capitals for a highly publicized second-round matchup. The series was heavily followed as it pitted Ovechkin of the Capitals against both Crosby and Malkin, who together finished as the league's top three scorers that season. In the second game, Crosby and Ovechkin recorded matching three-goal efforts for their first career playoff hat-tricks in a 4–3 Capitals victory. Despite being down 2–0 in the series, Crosby and the Penguins won the next three games and eventually defeated the Capitals in a seventh and deciding game, in which Crosby added another two goals. Following a sweep of the Carolina Hurricanes in the Eastern Conference finals, Crosby opted against recent NHL tradition and picked up the Prince of Wales Trophy, which he had left untouched the previous year. In explanation of the change of heart, Crosby said, "We didn't touch the trophy last year, and obviously we didn't have the result we wanted ... Although we haven't accomplished exactly what we want ... we can still enjoy it." The Penguins met the Detroit Red Wings for the second straight year in the Stanley Cup Final, and this time Crosby won his first Stanley Cup title in seven games. At 21 years, 10 months, and 5 days, Crosby became the youngest NHL captain to win the Stanley Cup since 1895. (The youngest captain to lead his team to the Stanley Cup in the history of the trophy is Mike Grant of the 1895 Montreal Victorias, who was 21 years and 2 months at the time.) In the deciding game seven, Crosby was forced to watch all but 32 seconds of the third period from the bench after suffering a knee injury less than halfway through the second period due to a hit from Wings' winger Johan Franzén. Following the game, Crosby was criticized by Detroit centre Kris Draper for neglecting to shake hands with some of Detroit's players in the handshake line, most notably Wings' defenceman and captain Nicklas Lidström. An irate Draper was quoted as saying, "Nick was waiting and waiting, and Crosby didn't come over to shake his hand. That's ridiculous, especially as their captain." Crosby replied afterward, saying, "I just won the Stanley Cup. I think I have the right to celebrate with my teammates. I know it's not easy waiting around... I understand if they don't feel like waiting around. But you know what? It's the easiest thing to do in the world, to shake hands after you win. I had no intentions of trying to skip guys and not shake their hands. I think that was a pretty unreasonable comment."

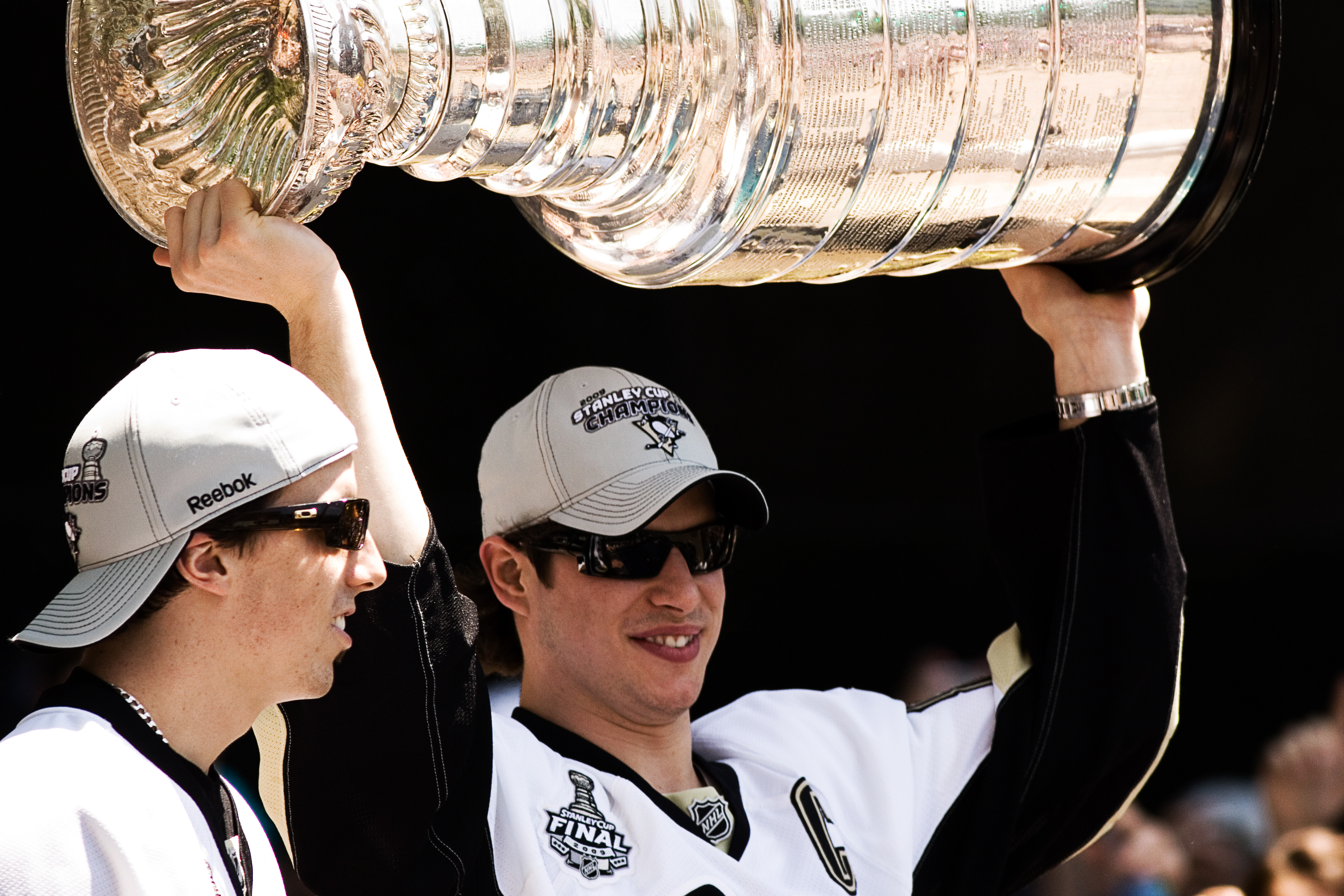
Crosby with Marc-André Fleury (left) and the Stanley Cup during the Penguins victory parade. By winning the Stanley Cup in 2009, Crosby became the youngest NHL captain to have his name engraved on the Stanley Cup.

==== Injury–plagued years, back-to-back Stanley Cups and Conn Smythe Trophies (2009–2018) ====
In the 2009–10 season, Crosby tied Tampa Bay Lightning centre Steven Stamkos for the lead in goals scored, with 51 goals each, both earning the Rocket Richard Trophy. He also garnered 58 assists for a total of 109 points, enough to tie with Washington Capitals winger and captain Alexander Ovechkin for second in league points, trailing only Vancouver Canucks' centre Henrik Sedin's, who ended the season with 112. Crosby was also named a finalist for the Hart Memorial Trophy and Ted Lindsay Award. Crosby won the Mark Messier Leadership Award, getting recognized as a "superior leader within the sport, setting a positive example through on-ice performance, motivation of team members and a dedication to the community". This was the second time he had received this honour, the other being in January 2007, during the award's first year when it was presented monthly. He was also included on NHL's all-decade second team of 2000s. Crosby's defending Stanley Cup champion and fourth-seeded Penguins were defeated in the second round of the 2010 playoffs, losing to the Montreal Canadiens in seven games, unable to build onto an initial 3–2 series lead. Crosby had 19 points (six goals, 13 assists) in all 13 games in the 2010 playoffs, though through seven games against the Canadiens, he had only one goal and four assists. Game seven was also the last game to be played at Mellon Arena, the Penguins' home rink since the start of the franchise. On July 27, 2010, Crosby joined his mentor from 2005 to 2006, his rookie year Mario Lemieux to be the first to skate on the new ice at the Consol Energy Center. The two skated for about five minutes before being joined on the ice by a group of young hockey fans all wearing Lemieux's 66 or Crosby's 87 jerseys.

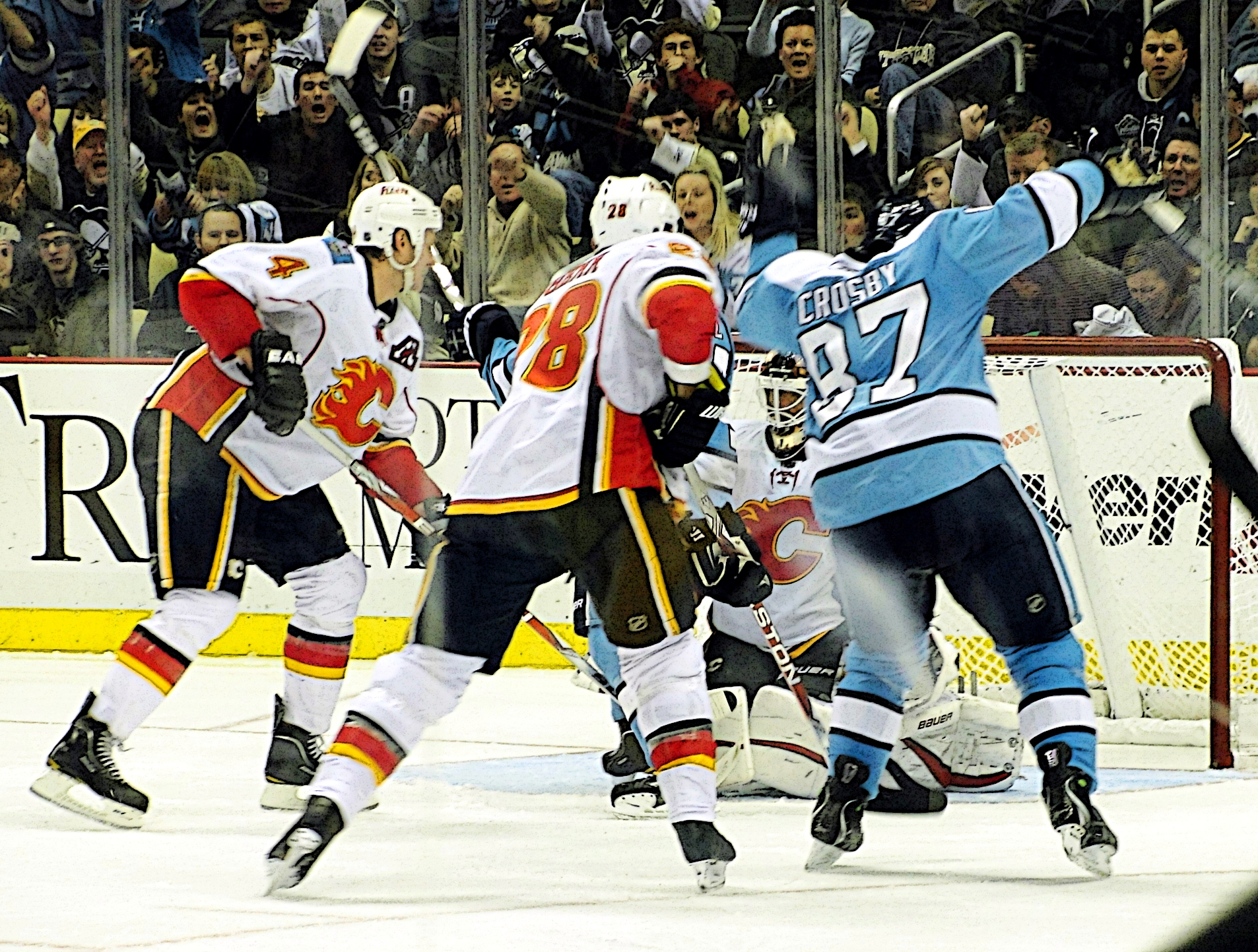
Crosby's 200th NHL goal, November 27, 2010

"When you get a typical injury you're given a time frame, you're gradually working towards getting back ... With concussions there is not generally a time frame or a span where you're feeling better. You feel like you're getting better and it can be one day and you're back to where you started. It's a frustrating injury and one that anyone has gone through can relate. It's a hard one to understand unless you've gone through it".

— Crosby on his concussions.

In the 2010–11 season, Crosby had a 25-game point streak, which began on November 5, 2010, against the Anaheim Ducks and ended on December 28, 2010, against the New York Islanders. During this streak, he had 27 goals (including three hat-tricks) and 24 assists for 51 points. This streak was tied for 11th-longest point streak in NHL history. During this streak, Crosby scored his 200th NHL goal in a 4–1 win over the Calgary Flames on Flames' goaltender Miikka Kiprusoff on November 27 and he was named First Star of the Month in both November and December, respectively. On January 3, 2011, Crosby was selected as a 2011 All-Star, along with teammates Evgeni Malkin, Marc-André Fleury and Kris Letang. However, neither Crosby nor Malkin were available to play in the All-Star Game due to injuries, and rookie Jeff Skinner (along with Paul Stastny) were named as replacements. In consecutive games – the 2011 NHL Winter Classic on January 1, 2011, against the Washington Capitals and then January 5 against the Tampa Bay Lightning – Crosby suffered hits to his head from Dave Steckel and Victor Hedman respectively. After experiencing several concussion symptoms, Crosby did not return for the rest of the season, including the 2011 playoffs, where the fourth-seeded Penguins would lose in seven games in the first round coincidentally to the Lightning, who finished as the fifth seed and surrendered a 3–1 series lead in the process. The Penguins were further crippled when Malkin suffered a torn ACL and MCL on February 4, taking him out for the rest of the season and leaving the Penguins without their two highest-scoring players. Despite Crosby's injury and subsequent absence for the final 41 games of the season, he finished as the Penguins' leading scorer. His 66 points in 41 games were 16 points ahead of the second-highest team scorer, defenceman Kris Letang. In so doing, Crosby set an NHL record for fewest games played by an NHL team's points leader.

Crosby missed the first 20 games of the 2011–12 season due to the lingering effects of his concussion or possibly multiple. He returned on November 21, 2011, in a game against the New York Islanders, scoring two goals and two assists in a 5–0 shutout for the Penguins. However, after playing another seven games – scoring a total of 12 points in eight games – Crosby's concussion-like symptoms returned on December 5, possibly following an elbow hit by Boston Bruins centre David Krejčí in his eighth game of the season. Despite passing a successful ImPACT test, Crosby decided not to return on the ice until he felt perfectly fine, stating that he also must "listen to [his] body". Crosby returned to action on March 15, 2012, recording two assists on goals by Chris Kunitz and Pascal Dupuis in a 5–2 win against the New York Rangers. Despite only playing 22 games, Crosby recorded eight goals and 29 assists for 37 points. He later credited neurologists at UPMC and chiropractic neurologist Ted Carrick with helping him return to hockey. Crosby's return in advance of the 2012 playoffs resulted in many experts predicting that the Penguins would win their second Stanley Cup title in four years, and though the Penguins were accordingly picked to oust the Philadelphia Flyers in their first-round series, it was acknowledged that it would be a tough series for both teams. The Flyers shocked the Penguins by winning the first three consecutive games, the third of which saw the teams combine for 158 penalty minutes. After an 8–4 loss in game three, Crosby was widely criticized for his conduct during the game, and for his testy post-game interview. When asked about an incident where Flyers winger Jakub Voráček had dropped his glove and Crosby swatted it away with his stick before Voráček could pick it up, Crosby replied, saying, "I don't like any guy on their team there, so his glove was near me, went to pick it up, and I pushed it, so yeah, that's... [...] I don't like them. Because I don't like them. I don't like... I don't like any guy on their team." When the interviewer suggested that he could have skated away, Crosby replied, "Skate away? Yeah, well, I didn't that time." The Penguins went on to win the next two games, but ultimately lost the series in game six. Crosby finished with three goals and five assists for eight points in all six games.

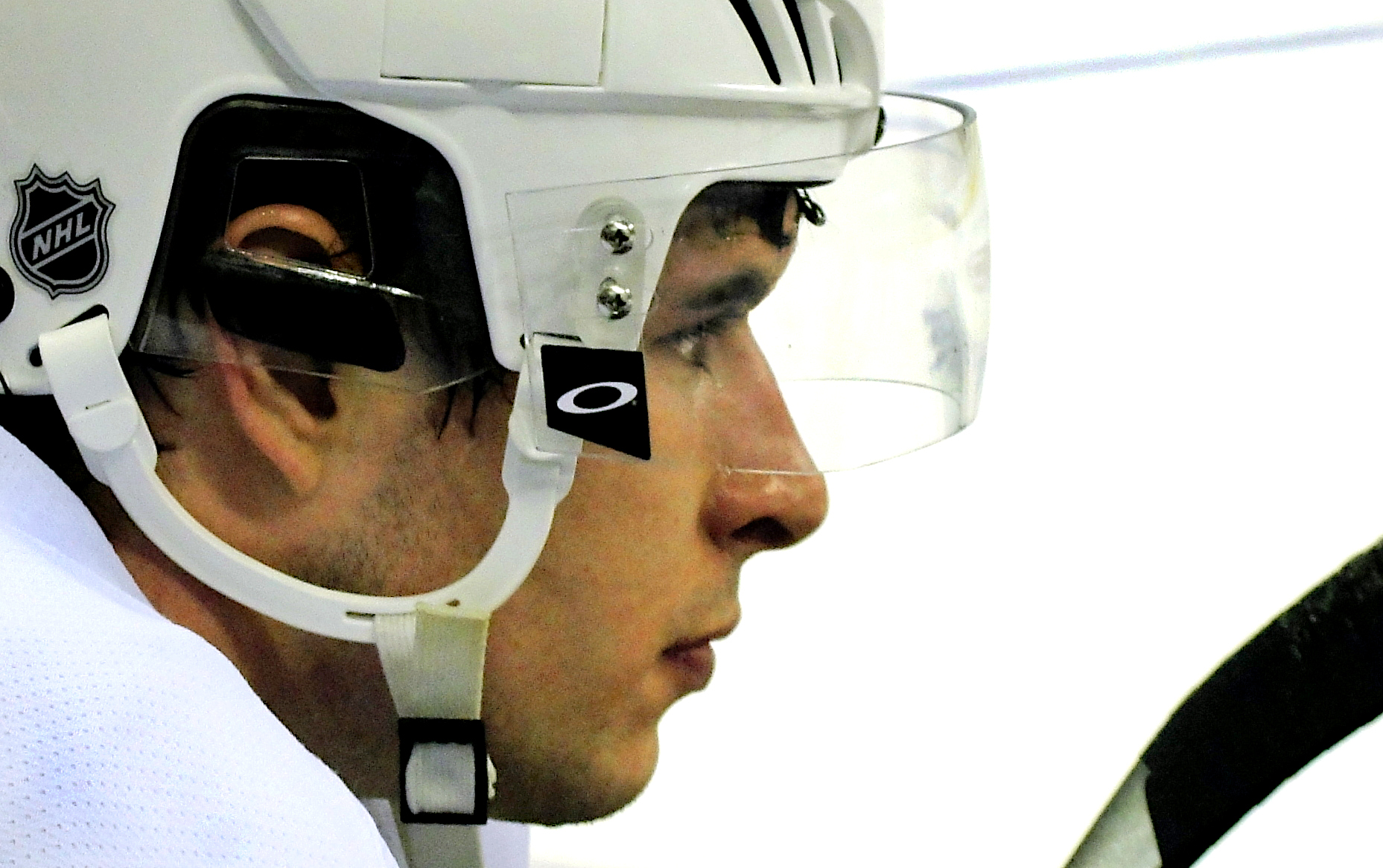
Crosby in December 2011. He was sidelined for most of the 2011–12 season after being diagnosed with concussion-like symptoms.

On June 28, 2012, the Penguins announced that Crosby agreed to a 12-year, $104.4 million contract extension set to keep Crosby in Pittsburgh through to the end of the 2024–25 NHL season. The start of the 2012–13 season was postponed until January 2013 due to the owners locking out the players as negotiations took place to solidify a new collective agreement for the players. During this time, Crosby was a regular attendee of meetings taking place between National Hockey League Players' Association (NHLPA) representatives and NHL owners. The lock-out began on September 15, 2012, and ended on January 6, 2013, with the NHL regular season beginning on January 19. During the 119-day lock-out, Crosby was often questioned about his future plans should the lockout persist, and said on more than one occasion that he was considering contract offers from various teams in European leagues (where many NHL players went so that they could continue playing in a professional capacity while waiting for the lock-out to end or for the NHL season to be officially cancelled). Crosby continued to practice and participated with other NHL players who did not go overseas in several exhibition games open to the public. With the season finally underway in January 2013, Crosby set the pace for scoring, totalling 31 points (nine goals and 22 assists) through the first 21 games. He remained hot through March, scoring another 25 points (six goals and 19 assists) in 15 games as the Penguins went unbeaten over this stretch. However, his regular season came to an abrupt end on March 30 in a home game against the New York Islanders. Crosby's teammate Brooks Orpik unleashed a slapshot which caught Crosby in the mouth, causing the centreman to lose several teeth. Crosby was down on the ice for several minutes before the medical staff was able to help him to the dressing room with Crosby holding a towel over his face. Initially, the prognosis was not severe, but it was discovered a short while later that Crosby had broken his jaw and would require several rounds of reconstructive dental surgery. He missed the final 12 games of the regular season and finished fourth in the scoring race, losing the title to Tampa Bay's Martin St. Louis by four points. Crosby returned to the ice May 5 for the Penguins' second game against their first-round playoff opponents, the New York Islanders, ironically, the team who Pittsburgh played when Crosby was injured weeks prior. Despite two goals from Crosby, Pittsburgh lost 3–2, tying the series at one game apiece. The top-seeded Penguins would ultimately prevail 4–2 in the series over the eighth-seeded Islanders with Crosby scoring nine points (three goals and six assists) in the five games in which he played. Crosby and the Penguins moved on to face the Ottawa Senators in the second round, with Crosby scoring a hat-trick in game two of the series. Pittsburgh quickly defeated Ottawa four games to one in the series with a still-hot Crosby finishing the series with four goals and two assists. The Eastern Conference finals came down to what many felt were the two best teams in the conference: Pittsburgh and Boston Bruins goaltender Tuukka Rask put on an outstanding performance, shutting down Pittsburgh's potent offence with the help of a stifling defensive effort from his teammates. The Penguins were held to just two goals in the series, with Rask stopping 134 of 136 shots on goal (.985%). Crosby, who was strong for the Penguins in the regular season and through the first two rounds of the playoffs was held off the score sheet entirely, finishing the series with no goals and no assists on 13 shots within the four games as the Bruins swept the Penguins in four-straight games. In the off-season, Crosby was awarded his second Ted Lindsay Award and finished as runner-up to the Hart Memorial Trophy and Bill Masterton Memorial Trophy.

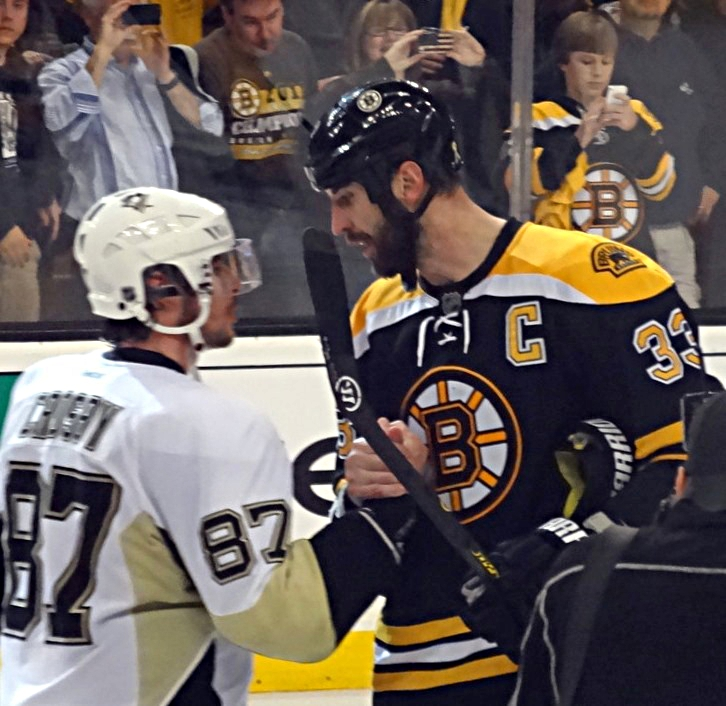
Crosby shakes hands with Bruins captain Zdeno Chára following Pittsburgh's elimination from the 2013 playoffs and Boston's four-game sweep over them in the Eastern Conference finals.

Crosby put together a healthy and productive campaign in 2013–14, playing 80 games for the first time since the 2009–10 season. Crosby finished the season with 36 goals and a league-leading 68 assists, marking the first time in his career that he led the league in assists. He also finished with a league-high 104 points, winning the Art Ross Trophy for the second time in his career. He also went on to win the Hart Memorial Trophy and the Ted Lindsay Award. Finishing first overall in the Metropolitan Division, the Penguins were matched-up with a new division rival, the Columbus Blue Jackets, in the first round of the 2014 playoffs. Despite a very back-and-forth series and not a single goal by Crosby, the Penguins defeated the Jackets in six games to advance to a second-round matchup with the New York Rangers. Going into their second-round series with the Rangers, Crosby looked to end a long playoff goal drought, which dated back to the 2013 conference finals against the Boston Bruins. After dropping the first game at home, Crosby broke his goal drought in game two as the Pens tied the series at 1–1 heading back to Madison Square Garden. The Penguins would capitalize on their game two win, taking the next two games and eliminating the Rangers' home-ice advantage. However, the Rangers rebounded, winning games 5, 6 and 7, sending the Penguins home without a prize for the fifth straight season and surrendering a 3–1 series lead. The team's collapse prompted Penguins ownership to fire general manager Ray Shero, replacing him with Jim Rutherford, the former general manager of the Carolina Hurricanes. Rutherford's first action as GM was to fire Dan Bylsma as head coach, and on June 25, he announced that Mike Johnston was the new head coach.

Crosby finished the 2014–15 season with the highest point-per-game average and a total of 84 points (28 goals, 56 assists), trailing only New York Islanders centre and captain John Tavares (86 points) and Art Ross winner and Dallas Stars winger and captain Jamie Benn (87 points). On November 26, 2014, Crosby scored his 800th career point against the Toronto Maple Leafs, becoming the sixth-fastest player in NHL history to reach that milestone. On April 1, 2015, in a game against goaltender Steve Mason of the Philadelphia Flyers, Crosby scored his 300th career NHL goal. Despite a strong start to the season, the injury-plagued Penguins narrowly entered the playoffs as the Eastern Conference's second wild card and eighth seed, beating the Boston Bruins by two points in the standings for the eighth and last playoff spot. Facing the Presidents' Trophy-winning New York Rangers in the opening round of the 2015 playoffs, Crosby helped even the series with two goals in game two on Rangers' goaltender Henrik Lundqvist. Despite this, the Penguins were defeated by the Rangers in five games and was eliminated in the first round for the first time since the 2012 playoffs.

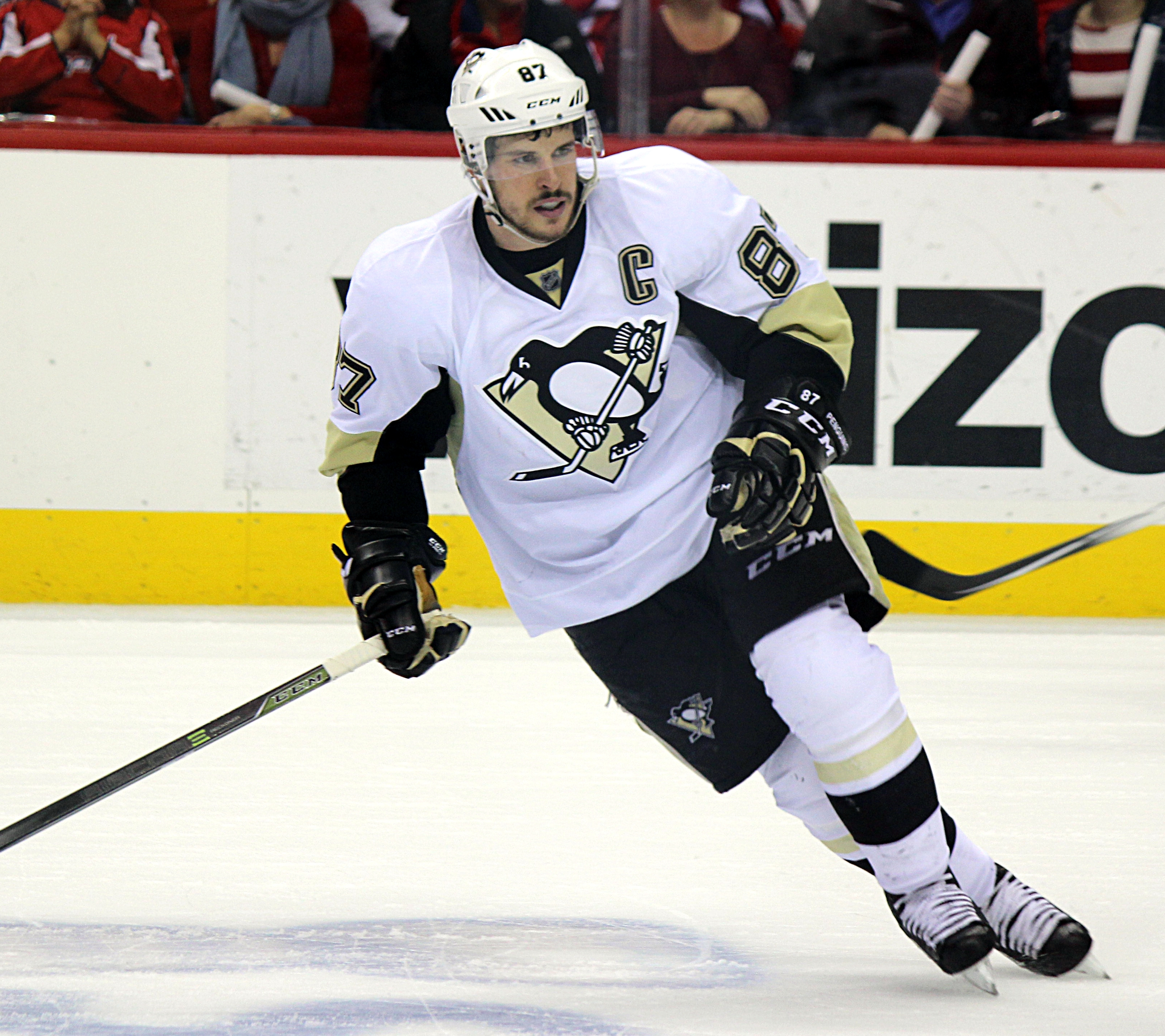
Crosby skating against the Capitals in the second round of the 2016 playoffs

In the 2015 off-season, the Penguins went through a major overhaul of their roster, adding a number of offensive players such as acquiring winger Phil Kessel from the Toronto Maple Leafs. Despite a line-up laced with some of the world's finest offensive talents, Crosby struggled to score points, as he and the team had for much of the Johnston era. By the time Johnston was fired on December 12, 2015, after posting a 15–10–3 record through 28 games, some media outlets began speculating that Crosby had aged out of his prime scoring years. On December 16, The Washington Post wrote, "Sidney Crosby has widely been regarded as the NHL's best player since he burst on the scene as a rookie in 2005 ... But Crosby just hasn't been himself this season, scoring just six goals and 13 assists for 19 points in the first 29 games and sitting with a plus/minus of minus-seven. All players go through slumps, but it is clear that the Crosby we knew has been on the decline for some time." His slow start was capped off by not being selected as a starter for the 2016 NHL All-Star Game. However, under new head coach Mike Sullivan, the 28-year-old turned his season around, outscoring all NHL players from December 12 through the end of the season. On February 2, Crosby scored three-straight goals against the Ottawa Senators for his first natural hat-trick in more than five years. Four days later, Crosby scored his 900th, 901st and 902nd career NHL points to fuel a 3–2 overtime comeback victory over the Florida Panthers. He tallied at least one point in 15 of Pittsburgh's 16 games in March, including six multi-point efforts, and was subsequently named the NHL's First Star of the Month. On April 2, Crosby recorded his 600th NHL assist as the Penguins clinched their berth in the 2016 playoffs. Six days later, he scored in overtime against the Washington Capitals to secure home-ice advantage in the first round of the playoffs. Crosby finished the 2015–16 season with 36 goals, 49 assists and 85 points in 80 games, including a career-high nine game-winning goals, and was voted team MVP for the sixth time in his career. His two-way game also received league-wide praise, with Hockey Hall of Fame head coach Scotty Bowman stating that Crosby would be a good candidate for the Frank J. Selke Trophy as the league's best defensive forward. Crosby's comeback also impressed Wayne Gretzky, who said, "He had a tough start, but the sign of an elite athlete is a guy that battles through it. He didn't point any fingers, he just battled through it, and I don't think there is any question the last 40 or so games, he made a case for the MVP. He was that good. He went to another level." On May 7, Crosby was named a finalist for the Hart Memorial Trophy which was eventually given to Chicago Blackhawks winger Patrick Kane. He finished as the first runner-up with 800 points and 11 first-place votes. After losing to New York Rangers in the past two playoffs, the Penguins eliminated the Rangers in the first round, winning in five games, after losing to the Rangers by the same series margin in the first round the previous year. Crosby led the team in scoring with three goals and five assists for eight points in the series. The Penguins then eliminated the Presidents' Trophy-winning Washington Capitals in six games, without much offensive production from either Crosby (two assists) or Malkin (one goal and one assist). Advancing to their first conference finals since 2013, Crosby scored the overtime winner against the Tampa Bay Lightning in game two. The goal was scored 40 seconds into overtime on Lightning goaltender Andrei Vasilevskiy for a 3–2 win, the fastest overtime goal in Penguins' playoff history, and the first of his career in the playoffs. In the following game, he scored the game-winning goal in a 4–2 victory. After dropping the next two games, Crosby scored his third game-winning goal of the series on Vasilevskiy in game six, forcing a final game in Pittsburgh. Defeating the Lightning 2–1 in game seven, Crosby helped his team win the Eastern Conference championship, advancing to the Stanley Cup Final against the San Jose Sharks and prevent the Lightning from clinching a second consecutive appearance in the Stanley Cup Finals of their own. In the Finals, the Penguins defeated the Sharks in six games to earn Crosby his second Stanley Cup title. He became the ninth player to win the Stanley Cup twice as well as two Olympic gold medals. Finishing the playoffs with 19 points (six goals and 13 assists), including the primary helper on the Cup-winning goal scored by Kris Letang, Crosby was awarded the Conn Smythe Trophy as the MVP of the playoffs.

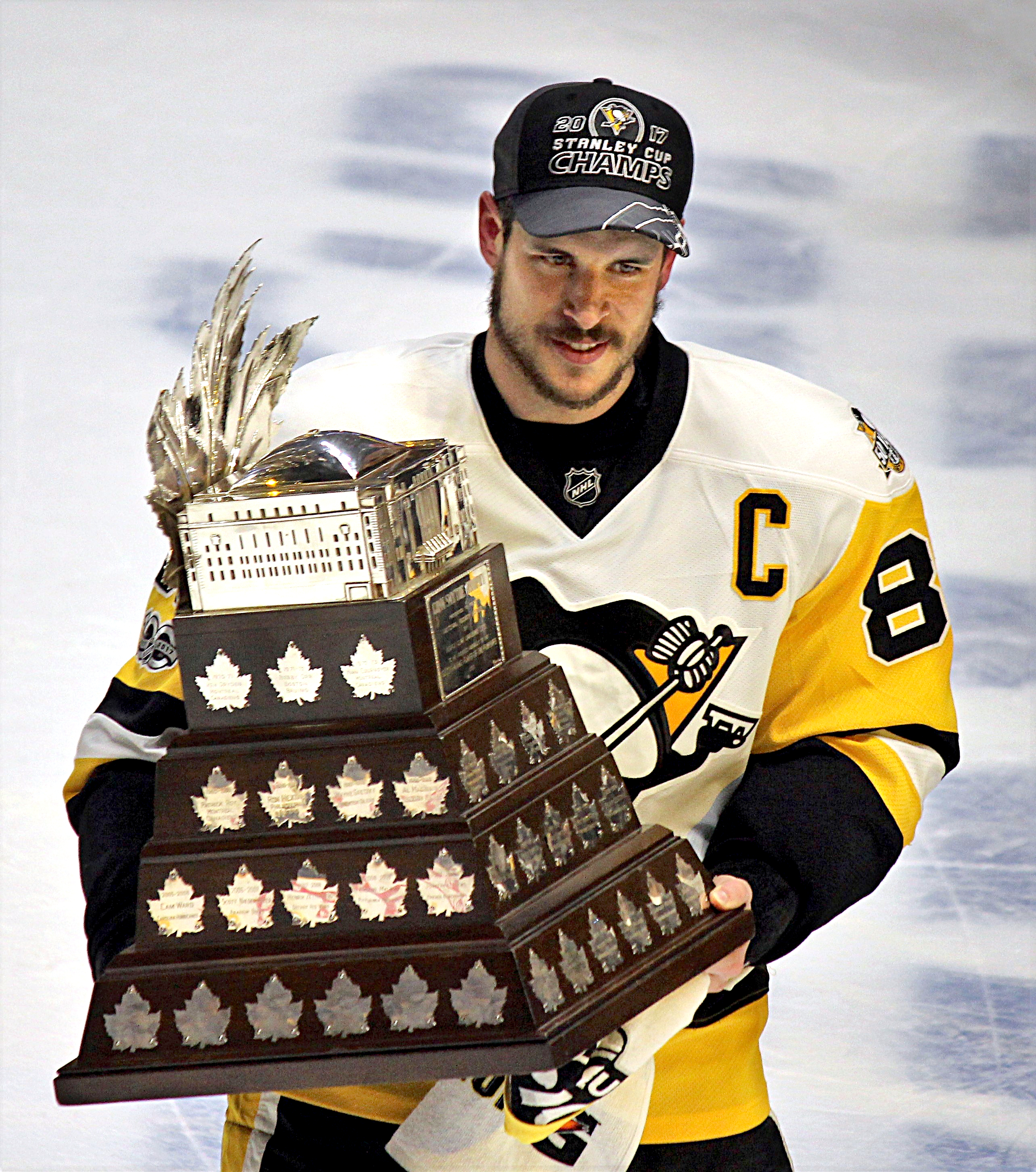
Crosby won his second straight Conn Smythe Trophy in 2017.

Crosby missed the first six games of the 2016–17 season after being diagnosed with a concussion in practice just a few days before the season opener against the Washington Capitals. Upon his return, he scored 30 goals in his first 45 games, and on February 16, 2017, he registered an assist on a Chris Kunitz goal against the Winnipeg Jets to reach 1,000 NHL points, doing so in just his 757th game to become the 12th-fastest (and 11th-youngest) player to reach that milestone. He also participated in his first NHL All-Star Game since 2007, winning the shooting accuracy segment of the Skills Competition. He was named team MVP and finished the season with 89 points (44 goals, 45 assists) in 75 contests played. His 89 points tied with Chicago Blackhawks' Patrick Kane as the runner(s) up for the Art Ross Trophy. It marked the eighth time he finished a season in the top-three in NHL scoring, tying Mario Lemieux, Stan Mikita and Phil Esposito for the third-most instances in history behind only Wayne Gretzky (15 times) and Gordie Howe (12 times). With his 44 goals, Crosby captured the Rocket Richard Trophy for the second time in his career. Crosby was also named a finalist for the Hart Memorial Trophy and Ted Lindsay Award with both awards eventually going to Edmonton Oilers centre and captain Connor McDavid. Entering the 2017 playoffs as the defending Stanley Cup champions, the Penguins defeated the Columbus Blue Jackets in five games before meeting the back to back Presidents' Trophy-winning Washington Capitals in the second round for the second consecutive year. After winning the first two games on the road, Crosby sustained a concussion after suffering an injury from a slash and cross-check from both Alexander Ovechkin and Matt Niskanen in game three. He missed game four but returned to practice the next day and played in game five. The Penguins eventually eliminated the Capitals in game seven, with Crosby assisting on the series-winning goal by Bryan Rust. The Penguins then defeated the Ottawa Senators in a gruelling seven-game series to secure their second consecutive trip to the Stanley Cup Finals. Crosby had the primary assist on the series-clinching goal, scored by Chris Kunitz in double overtime. Facing the eighth-seeded Nashville Predators in the Finals, Pittsburgh jumped out to a two-game lead, despite being outplayed for long stretches in both games. The Predators responded by tying up the series, winning games three and four at home. In game five, the Penguins' captain delivered a dominant performance, adding three assists in a 6–0 win to pass Lemieux for most Stanley Cup Finals points (20) in franchise history. After defeating the Predators 2–0 in game six, the Penguins became the first team to repeat as Stanley Cup champions since the 1997–98 Detroit Red Wings, and the first to do so in the salary cap era (since 2005–06). Crosby also won his second consecutive Conn Smythe Trophy as the most valuable player of the playoffs, only the third player to do so after Bernie Parent (1974, 1975) and Mario Lemieux (1991, 1992). He finished second in scoring behind Evgeni Malkin with 27 points (eight goals and 19 assists) in 24 games.

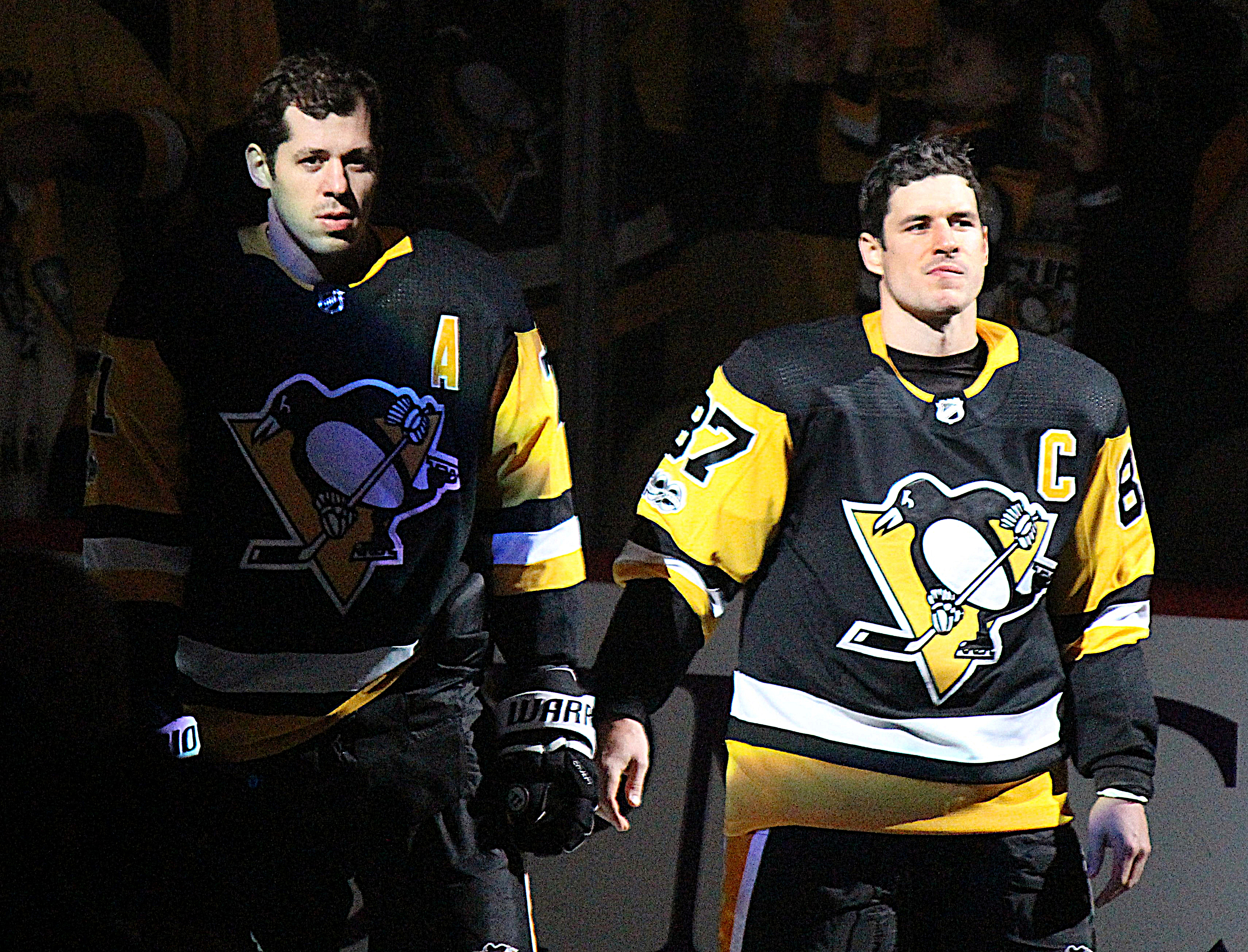
Crosby and Evgeni Malkin (left) in October 2017. They became the cornerstone players of the Pittsburgh Penguins in the mid-2000s, earning the nickname "The Two-Headed Monster".

In the 2017–18 season, Crosby appeared in all 82 of Pittsburgh's regular season games for the first time in his career, finishing with 29 goals and 60 assists for 89 points. On February 11, 2018, he scored his 400th NHL goal against Jake Allen of the St. Louis Blues, becoming the 95th player in NHL history to reach the milestone as the Penguins defeated the Blues 4–1. On March 21, he recorded his 700th career NHL assist on a Jake Guentzel goal in a 5–3 victory over the Montreal Canadiens. The Penguins began their 2018 playoff campaign against their inner-state rival, the Philadelphia Flyers. In game one of the Battle of Pennsylvania, Crosby recorded a natural hat-trick in a 7–0 win. On April 18, in game four, Crosby passed Mario Lemieux as the Penguins' all-time playoff points leader with 173. The Penguins ultimately defeated the fifth-seeded Flyers in six games, with Crosby recording six goals and seven assists for 13 points. After the series, retired Hockey Hall of Fame centre Bryan Trottier said of Crosby, "Sid has a wonderful gift to maintain his composure and not get rattled. You like the emotion he shows, too. I think he fires his team up, and that's why he's wearing the 'C' [for captain]." The Penguins were eventually eliminated in game six of the second round by the second-seeded and eventual Stanley Cup champion Washington Capitals with Capitals' centre Evgeny Kuznetsov scoring the winning goal in overtime. Crosby finished with 21 points (nine goals and 12 assists) in all 12 games, pushing his career playoff total to 185, tied with Steve Yzerman for tenth-most all-time.

==== Early playoff exits (2018–2022) ====
On December 31, 2018, Crosby played his 900th NHL game in a 3–2 win over the Minnesota Wild, becoming the second player in Penguins history to reach the mark. On January 3, 2019, Crosby was selected to play in the NHL All-Star Game for the eighth time in his career. He scored four goals and four assists, helping the Metropolitan Division to victory; his efforts won him his first All-Star MVP award, making him the sixth in NHL history to have won that award after having won the Conn Smythe Trophy and Hart Memorial Trophy. During the 2018–19 season, Crosby passed Mario Lemieux to become the Penguins' all-time leader in games played (916), and moved into second place on the Pens' all-time scoring list with his 440th career goal in a 5–1 victory over the Montreal Canadiens on March 3. Two days later, he became the 48th player in NHL history to score at least 1,200 career points against the Florida Panthers. He finished the season with 100 points (35 goals and 65 assists), the first time he has reached the 100-point mark since scoring 104 points in 2013–14. Crosby finished 4th in voting for the Selke Trophy and became a Hart Trophy finalist for the seventh time in his career as the Selke eventually went to St. Louis Blues centre Ryan O'Reilly and the Hart getting awarded to Tampa Bay Lightning winger Nikita Kucherov, respectively. He was also elected team-MVP.

Crosby was selected to the NHL All-Decade First Team in January 2020. The Penguins finished fifth in the Eastern Conference in the COVID-19 pandemic-shortened 2019–20 season, facing the 12th-seeded Montreal Canadiens in the Eastern Conference qualifying round. The Canadiens upset the Penguins in four games, eliminating Pittsburgh on August 7, 2020, Crosby's 33rd birthday.

In the pandemic-shortened 2020–21 season, Crosby led the team in scoring with 62 points (24 goals and 38 assists), and was the recipient of the team's MVP Award and the Players' Player Award. He was also a finalist for the Ted Lindsay Award which was eventually awarded to Edmonton Oilers centre and captain Connor McDavid. On February 20, 2021, Crosby became the first player in Penguins history to play 1,000 games with the franchise in a 3–2 win over the New York Islanders. The team clinched a playoff berth for the 15th consecutive season under Crosby's captaincy, the longest active postseason streak among all teams in the North American professional sports leagues. However, the Penguins were eliminated in the first round of the 2021 playoffs by the New York Islanders for the second time in three seasons.

On February 15, 2022, Crosby scored his 500th career goal on a power play against the Philadelphia Flyers, becoming the 46th player to score that many goals in NHL history and the 18th to have scored them all for a single team. He was the second Penguin to score 500 goals, after Lemieux. Continuing to hit new milestones, in an April 10 game against the Nashville Predators he recorded a goal and an assist in regulation time, before scoring the overtime-winning goal, his 1400th point in the NHL. Crosby finished the 2021–22 season with 31 goals and 53 assists for 84 points in 69 games played, while the Penguins were third in the Metropolitan Division. They advanced into the 2022 playoffs to meet the New York Rangers. With both Evgeni Malkin and Kris Letang's contracts up in the summer, there was some question as to whether this would be the final outing for the core of the Penguins franchise in Crosby's era. In game three of the series against the Rangers, Crosby recorded his 197th career playoff point, passing Paul Coffey for sixth place in all-time playoff point standings. Two days later, he managed a goal and two assists in the Penguins' 7–2 victory in game four and 3–1 series lead, becoming the sixth player in league history to record 200 career points in the playoffs. Midway through the second period of game five in Madison Square Garden, with the Penguins up 2–0, Crosby took an elbow to the head from Rangers defenceman Jacob Trouba and exited the game. In his absence, the Rangers rallied to win 5–3 and stave off elimination, and Crosby's departure was widely cited as the game's turning point. Head coach Mike Sullivan said that Crosby was being evaluated. After missing game six, Crosby returned for game seven, alongside absent team goaltender Tristan Jarry and winger Rickard Rakell. However, the Penguins lost to the Rangers in overtime with Rangers winger Artemi Panarin scoring the winner for the Rangers to take a 4–3 win in the game and 4–3 win in the series, eliminating the Penguins. The Penguins surrendered a 3–1 series lead to the Rangers for the second time in less than a decade.

==== Recent years (2022–present) ====
In the 2022 off-season, it was reported that Crosby played a key role in facilitating a new deal between the Penguins and Evgeni Malkin, after the latter had initially announced he would test free agency. Crosby began the 2022–23 season by registering two goals and four assists in his first two games, being named the first star of the first week while leading the league in scoring. After strong initial results, the team struggled with a lengthy losing streak, but Crosby recorded his 900th career assist on a Jake Guentzel goal on November 5, 2022, a 3–2 loss to the Seattle Kraken. He was the sixth-fastest player to this feat in NHL history. On April 8, Crosby registered his 1500th career point in a 5–1 win against the Detroit Red Wings, the fifteenth NHL player to hit that milestone, and in the sixth-fewest games (1188). As the poor performance of the team continued into the spring, the Penguins' league-best 16-year playoff streak increasingly came into jeopardy, and by the final weeks of the season they were battling the Florida Panther] and the New York Islanders for the two Eastern Conference wildcard positions. A 5–2 loss to the Chicago Blackhawks on April 11, at that moment the team at the bottom of the standings, in the penultimate game of the season, combined with an Islanders victory the following day, sealed the Penguins' missing the playoffs for the first time since 2005–06, Crosby's rookie season and for the first time in Crosby's captaincy. This happened despite Crosby playing all 82 games for only the second time in his career, and doing so alongside Evgeni Malkin for the first time. Much recrimination ensued among fans and commentators, with many calling for the sacking of Penguins general manager Ron Hextall for his perceived mistakes in constructing the team in the previous 2022 off-season. Hextall and team executive Brian Burke were both fired the day after the season ended, with owners Fenway Sports Group promising "the goal of contending for the Stanley Cup has not changed."

Shortly the 2023–24 season, his 19th season in the NHL, on November 4, 2023, Crosby skated in his 1,200th game, recording an assist in a 10–2 victory over the San Jose Sharks. About the achievement, Crosby said: "You don't just love it when it's good to you. You love it when it's tough and when it's difficult too. When that passion's not there, or that love's not there, it's probably time to stop doing it." On April 1, 2024, following a 5–2 win over the New York Rangers, Crosby became the second player in NHL history to average a point per game for the 19th consecutive season, joining Wayne Gretzky. On April 11, Crosby recorded his 1,000th NHL assist on a goal by Erik Karlsson in a 6–5 overtime win over the Detroit Red Wings to become the 14th player in league history and seventh fastest player to hit the mark (at 1,269 games). Crosby finished the season playing in all 82 contests played with 42 goals, 52 assists and 94 points recorded. Despite his continuation of individual productivity, the Penguins finished three points out of a playoff spot marking the first time in Crosby's tenure where the Penguins missed the playoffs in two consecutive seasons.

On September 16, 2024, Crosby signed a two-year $17.4 million extension ($8.7 million average) to remain with the Penguins. On November 23, Crosby scored his 600th NHL goal against goaltender Karel Vejmelka of the Utah Mammoth, becoming the 21st player in league history and second player in Penguins history to achieve the feat as the Penguins lost the game 6–1. The Penguins continued to struggle as a team, missing the playoffs for the third consecutive time and fourth time in Crosby's tenure, ending up 11 points short of the last playoff spot. Despite the team's struggles, Crosby remained productive individually as he finished the season with 33 goals and 58 assists for 91 points in 80 games. Despite these offensive statistics, he had a career-worst −20 plus-minus rating. On March 28, 2025 Crosby became the only player in NHL history to average over a point-per-game over 20 seasons.

On December 22, 2025, Crosby became the Penguins all-time points leader with 1,724 points, at the same time passing Mario Lemieux for 8th all-time in NHL scoring. Crosby would later climb to 7th on the all-time scoring list on April 4, 2026, after a two point game against the Florida Panthers, passing Steve Yzerman.

== International play ==
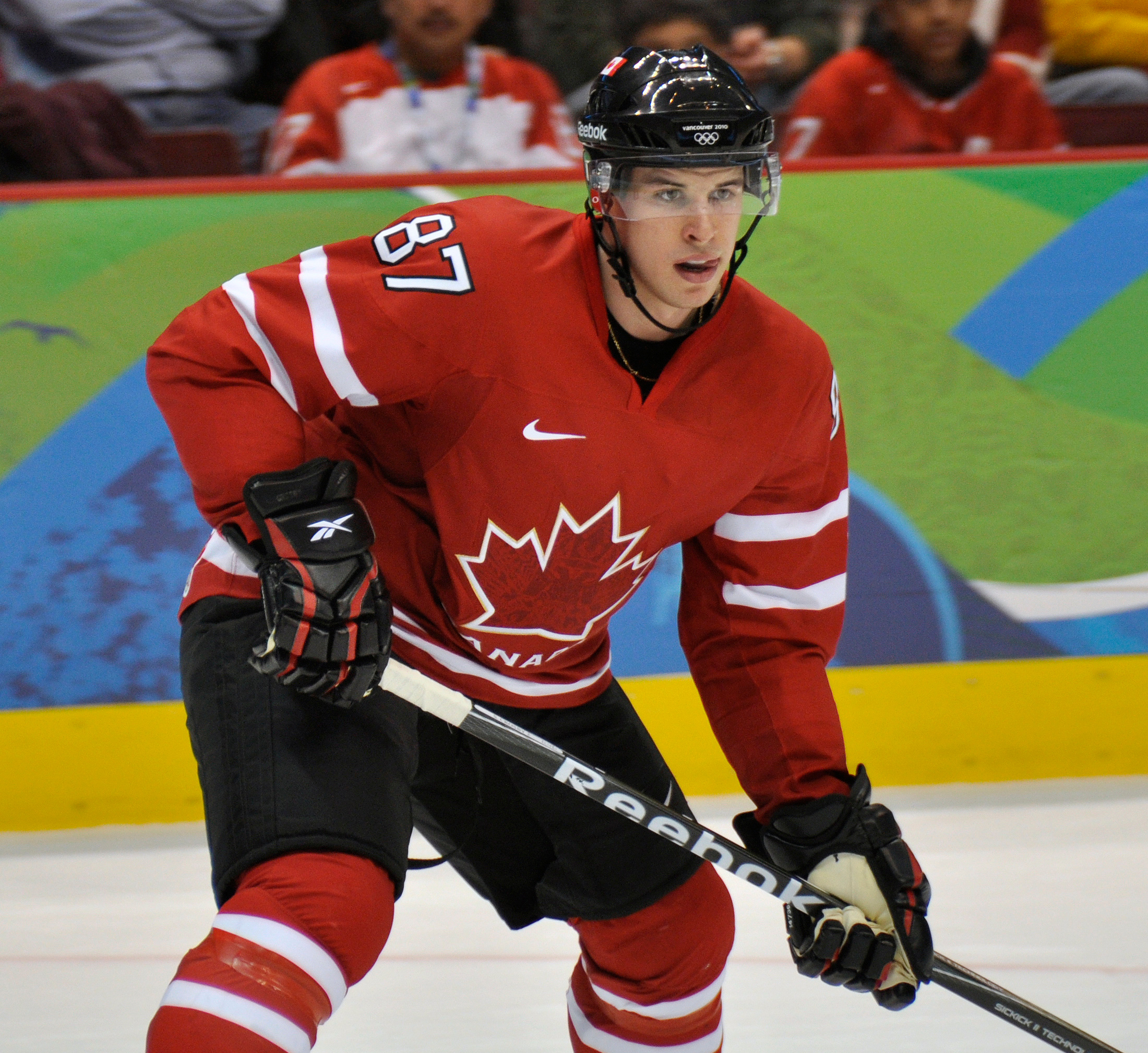
- Crosby with the Canadian men's national ice hockey team during the 2010 Winter Olympics

Medal record

Representing Canada

Men's ice hockey

Olympic Games
Gold medal – first place	2010 Vancouver	
Gold medal – first place	2014 Sochi	
Silver medal – second place	2026 Milano Cortina	

World Championships
Gold medal – first place	2015 Czech Republic	

World Cup
Gold medal – first place	2016 Toronto	

4 Nations Face-Off
Winner	2025 Canada/United States	

World Junior Championships
Gold medal – first place	2005 United States	
Silver medal – second place	2004 Finland	

=== Junior ===
Crosby debuted internationally for Canada at the 2003 U-18 Junior World Cup. He was the youngest player on the under-18 team, having turned 16 shortly before the beginning of the tournament. After seven consecutive gold medals at the tournament, Canada lost in the bronze medal game to the Czech Republic 8–2. He scored four goals and six points over five tournament games.

Crosby went on to compete in two World Junior Championships with Canada under-20 team. When he was named to the team in December 2003, he became the fifth 16-year-old to represent Canada at the tournament, following Jay Bouwmeester, Jason Spezza, Eric Lindros and Wayne Gretzky. Competing in the 2004 World Junior Championships, he then became the youngest player to score a goal in the history of the tournament at 16 years, 4 months, and 21 days when he scored against Switzerland in a 7–2 win. This record would last until the 2012 World Juniors when Aleksander Barkov of Finland scored a goal aged 16 years, 4 months. Crosby finished the tournament with two goals and three assists in six games, helping Canada to a silver medal finish. The following year, he returned for Canada at the 2005 World Junior Championships. He improved to six goals and three assists as Canada earned gold. Crosby stated the following year that his most memorable ice hockey moment was winning his World Junior gold medal.

=== Senior ===
==== 2006–2016 ====
After completing his rookie season with the Pittsburgh Penguins, Crosby competed in the 2006 IIHF World Championship as an alternate captain for Canada. Scoring a tournament-best eight goals and eight assists in nine games, he became the youngest player ever to win a World Championship scoring title. Despite his performance, Canada failed to medal, being shut-out by Finland 5–0 in the bronze medal game. Crosby was named the tournament's top forward and to the competition's all-star team.

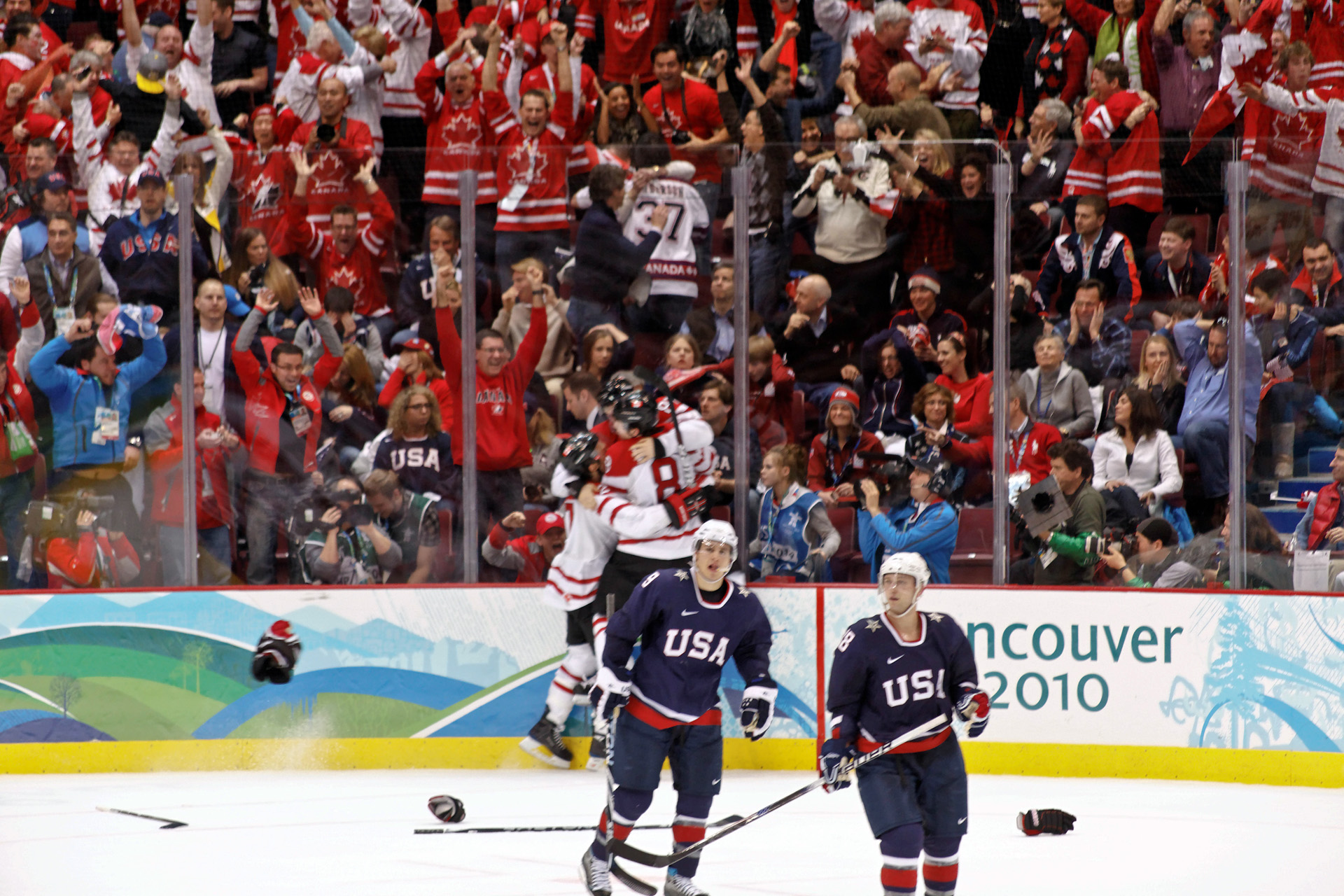
Crosby (against glass) celebrates moments after scoring the gold medal-winning goal at the 2010 Winter Olympics over the United States

After being omitted from Canada's Olympic team in 2006, Crosby was named to the Canadian roster on December 30, 2009, as an alternate captain for the 2010 Winter Olympics. He scored the game-winning shootout goal for Canada in the second game of the preliminary round against Switzerland. After going pointless in the quarterfinal and semifinal against Russia and Slovakia respectively, Crosby scored the winning goal 7 minutes and 40 seconds into overtime against the United States in the gold medal game. The goal has later become known as the "Golden Goal" due to it being scored in the gold medal game. It is also regarded by some as "Canada's most iconic sports moment".

Following the Penguins' second-round elimination in the 2010 Stanley Cup playoffs, Crosby declined an invitation to join Canada midway through the 2010 IIHF World Championship. Crosby was selected to represent Canada at the 2014 Winter Olympics and was later named team captain. Canada won gold, with Crosby contributing one goal and two assists in six games. He scored his only goal in the final against Sweden, further establishing his reputation as "a player who rises up in big games". In 2015, Crosby captained Canada to its first World Championship title since 2007, with the team winning all 10 games and scoring 66 goals. Crosby, scoring four goals and seven assists in nine games, became the 26th member of the Triple Gold Club. He is the first member of the club to captain all three championship teams, and the first member to be a first overall NHL draft pick.

In 2016, Hockey Canada named Crosby captain for the 2016 World Cup of Hockey. Crosby, who led the tournament in scoring with 10 points, helping Canada win the championship, and was named the most valuable player. He joined Bobby Orr and Wayne Gretzky as the only players to win the Conn Smythe Trophy, Hart Memorial Trophy and World Cup MVP. Canada's head coach Mike Babcock described Crosby as a serial winner, saying, "He's that high-end competitor. He's a good leader because he tries to do it right all the time. He demands a lot out of himself. In doing so, he demands a lot out of his teammates."

==== 2017–present ====
In 2020, Crosby was named to the IIHF All-Time Canada Team and the Men's All-Decade Team. On October 3, 2021, Crosby was one of the first three players named to roster for Canada's team for the 2022 Winter Olympics, alongside Connor McDavid and Alex Pietrangelo. However, due to the NHL's subsequent decision not to attend the Winter Olympics as a result of the Omicron variant's impacts on scheduling, Crosby was unable to compete. He said afterward that "I've been fortunate enough to be part of two. I definitely feel for the guys who have missed numerous opportunities."

On June 28, 2024, Crosby was one of the first six players selected to represent Team Canada in the 2025 4 Nations Face-Off, the first international tournament with full NHL participation since 2016. He was later named captain of the team. Crosby missed the Penguins' final two games before the tournament due to injury, but confirmed that he would participate still. He had three assists in Team Canada's 4–3 opening victory against Sweden, including on the overtime winner. Canada went on to win the tournament, with Crosby finishing with five points. Later the same year, following Pittsburgh not qualifying for the 2025 Stanley Cup playoffs, Crosby accepted an invitation to join Team Canada at the 2025 IIHF World Championship in Stockholm. This was to be his first appearance at the World Championship since 2015. Former Penguins teammate Marc-André Fleury, who had retired from the NHL at season's end, also announced that he would participate in the tournament as his final competition.

With NHL players returning to the 2026 Winter Olympics, after missing the previous two editions, Crosby was part of the Canadian Olympic team for the third time in his career. He was subsequently named the national team's captain again. Crosby recorded three points in Canada's 10–2 victory over France on February 15, bringing his Olympic total to 16. In doing so he surpassed former teammate Jarome Iginla as Team Canada's all-time leader in points scored at Olympics which allowed NHL players to participate, breaking Iginla's former record of 14. In Canada's February 18 quarterfinal meeting with Czechia, Crosby exited midway through the second period after successive hits by Czech players Radko Gudas and Martin Nečas, and was reported to have sustained a lower-body injury. He addressed the team in between the second and third periods, and was credited with helping inspire the team to victory despite not being able to play. He did not play in the team's semi-final or final, in his absence ceding the captaincy to Connor McDavid. Canada won the silver medal, the third Olympic medal of his career. Explaining his decision on whether he would be able to play in the final, Crosby indicated "ultimately, I think it was about what's best for our group and what gives us the best chance to win," adding: "If I'm not able to go, I'm not going to compromise our team, put myself ahead of that." Later that year, following Pittsburgh's elimination in the first round of the 2026 Stanley Cup Playoffs, Crosby accepted an invitation to play for Team Canada at the 2026 IIHF World Championship in Switzerland. Prior to his inclusion on the team, Macklin Celebrini had been named captain for the tournament. After Crosby's inclusion, the players on the team decided that Celebrini would remain captain with Crosby named as an alternate captain for the tournament.

== Player profile ==
=== Style of play ===
His lower-body strength is probably unparalleled in the league. It's not just about his speed, but how he can use his lower body to protect the puck in the corner. When he takes the puck through the neutral zone, he's a nightmare to defend because he seems to explode and take it to another gear as soon as the puck touches his stick.

— Logan Couture of the San Jose Sharks on Crosby in his January 2015 column for The Players' Tribune.

As captain and first-line centre for Canada, Crosby played with different line mates in almost every game as the coaching staff struggled to find players capable of keeping pace with the superstar centre at the 2010 Winter Olympic Games in Vancouver, and again at the 2014 Winter Olympic Games in Sochi. Crosby's fellow countryman and Olympic teammate, Rick Nash, was questioned by the media about this, at one point saying, "I think he's a tough guy to keep up with. He's so fast. The way he thinks about the game seems like it's far beyond everyone else's process. It's the same thing in the last Olympics, keep shuffling around until you found something that fit." Team Canada's assistant coach in Vancouver, Ken Hitchcock, recalled, "Sid thinks at a level, when the other team has the puck, that's above everyone else in the league [NHL]. His anticipation when the other team has the puck is so high, he knows where it's going ahead of time. He can pick off passes, make you make errors. And then he also knows where people are located on the ice, so he can turn that turnover into a scoring chance."

Other professional NHL players have particularly noted Crosby for his backhand shot. For example, in his column for The Players' Tribune in July 2015, Jonathan Quick of the Los Angeles Kings praised Crosby for having "the best backhand shot" in the NHL. "His blade is almost completely flat, which combined with his ridiculous forearm strength gives him the ability to go forehand to your five hole instantly or turn it over to the backhand and roof it (a lot of guys can't do this with a flat blade)."

=== Reputation ===
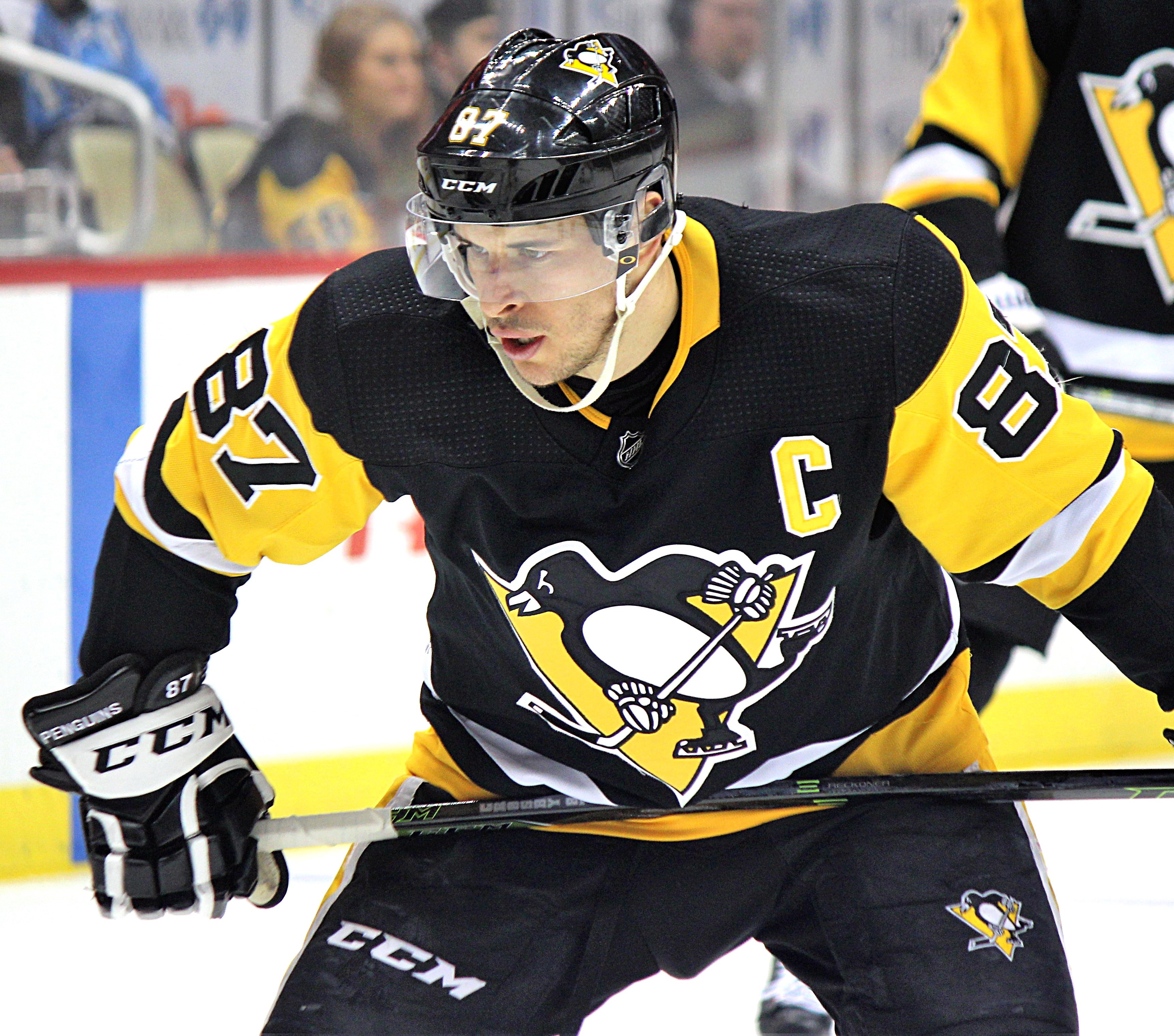
Crosby during a game against the New York Islanders in March 2018.

Noted for his on-ice vision, passing ability, leadership, work ethic, and complete overall game, Crosby is considered to be one of the greatest players of all time. Bobby Orr named Crosby among the five best players in the history of NHL. Gretzky said of Crosby in September 2016, "He's proven over and over that he's the best player in the game today. And it seems like the more important the game, the more impact that he makes on a game." Gordie Howe was also impressed by Crosby, "I met him and I've seen him play. Unless you put two guys on him, he'll kill you in a game." In October 2016, Mario Lemieux praised his protégé for his ability to play both sides of the puck: "I think he's more of a complete player. Defensively, I think he's improved a lot over the last couple of years." In an April 2018 article for The Washington Post, other players, teammates and coaches highlighted his work ethic and strive for greatness as a major factor to Crosby's lasting success. "While his natural ability – powerful skating, pistol-quick hands, uncommon feel – made him a phenom, his creative, distinct capacity for work has enabled him to stay atop the NHL." In March 2019, Pittsburgh head coach Mike Sullivan described Crosby as "best 200-foot player in the game" and the "heartbeat" of the Penguins.

On January 27, 2017, in a ceremony during the All-Star Weekend in Los Angeles, Crosby was named one of the 100 Greatest NHL Players in history. In that same year, Fox Sports ranked Crosby 15th on their "21 greatest athletes of the 21st century (so far)" list, and TSN named him the eighth-best NHL player of all time. Four months before the 2022 Winter Olympics, Rob Rossi of The Athletic called him "arguably North America's most dominant team-sport Winter Olympian." In a survey conducted by Sportsnet in June 2017, Crosby was voted by Canadians to be the greatest athlete of the 21st century. A poll conducted by the NHLPA in March 2018 of more than 500 players resulted in Crosby being voted the "most difficult to play against, best role model, best team player, the player you'd want to win one game, and the player who would be a great coach upon retirement". In April 2018, Crosby was chosen as Nova Scotia's "Best athlete ever" by the Nova Scotia Sport Hall of Fame. In March 2019, an anonymous survey conducted by The Athletic showed that Crosby was regarded the best all-around NHL player by his peers.

Considered a generational talent and a franchise player, drafting Crosby changed the fortunes of a struggling Pittsburgh Penguins. It helped secure funding for a new arena and ended speculation that the franchise would relocate to another city. In 2005–06, his presence helped Pittsburgh's attendance increase by 33%. Crosby's arrival also aided in reinvigorating and expanding the roots of hockey in the Pittsburgh area. Penguins CEO and president David Morehouse said, "We were in last place, we were last in revenues, we were last in attendance, our TV ratings were minimal and we were in the oldest building in the NHL... We were able to draw attention to us as a franchise because of the drafting of Sidney Crosby and the subsequent success we had."

Crosby is well known for welcoming new teammates with open arms. Former teammate and NHL veteran Matt Cullen has said that "[he watches] how he makes time to make a real effort to include guys and go out of his way to spend time with younger guys, and I know that goes a long way." Crosby often does research on new members of the organization, even players who have not yet made the roster, and makes sure to greet them.

Some current players who grew up watching Crosby, such as Jack Hughes of the New Jersey Devils, have said that as emerging youth hockey stars they tried to emulate not Crosby but other players, because "playing at his [Crosby's] level just wasn't realistic".

== Jerseys ==
Crosby's number 87 Pittsburgh Penguins jersey was the top seller on the NHL's website from September 2005 to February 2008. It has continued to be among the top-selling jerseys since his rookie season. In January 2005, an Air Canada baggage handler in Montreal stole Crosby's red Canada jersey from the World Junior Hockey Championship. It was recovered later in a mailbox. His white jersey from the tournament was temporarily delisted from an auction while the red one was missing. It eventually sold for CA$22,100, which went to youth hockey charities and 2004 Indian Ocean earthquake relief.

Less than a year later, one of Crosby's game-worn sweaters disappeared. The jersey he wore in his first NHL game, played against the New Jersey Devils, disappeared from his father's luggage during a flight from Pittsburgh to Buffalo. The jersey was later found at the Pittsburgh International Airport between a piece of equipment and a stairwell. Crosby's jersey from his third NHL game was the highest-selling NHL jersey in an auction for Hurricane Katrina relief – it sold for $21,010. During an online auction held by the NHL and the NHL Players Association to benefit Hockey Fights Cancer, Crosby's game-worn jersey from the first period of the 2007 All-Star Game earned the most money. Crosby's sold for US$47,520, more than eight times the next highest price—$5,681 for the jersey worn by Brendan Shanahan of the New York Rangers.

Following Crosby's Olympic gold medal victory with Canada in 2010, it was announced that his stick and glove were missing. It was initially suspected that they might have been stolen; Reebok Canada offered a reward of CA$10,000 for their return, "no questions asked". On March 10, the items were found: Crosby's stick had been placed in a shipment bound for the International Ice Hockey Federation Hall of Fame in Saint Petersburg, Russia, (the shipment was intercepted in Toronto) and his glove was found in a hockey bag belonging to Olympic teammate and Boston Bruins' centre Patrice Bergeron, whose stall was beside Crosby's in the locker room.

== Personal life ==
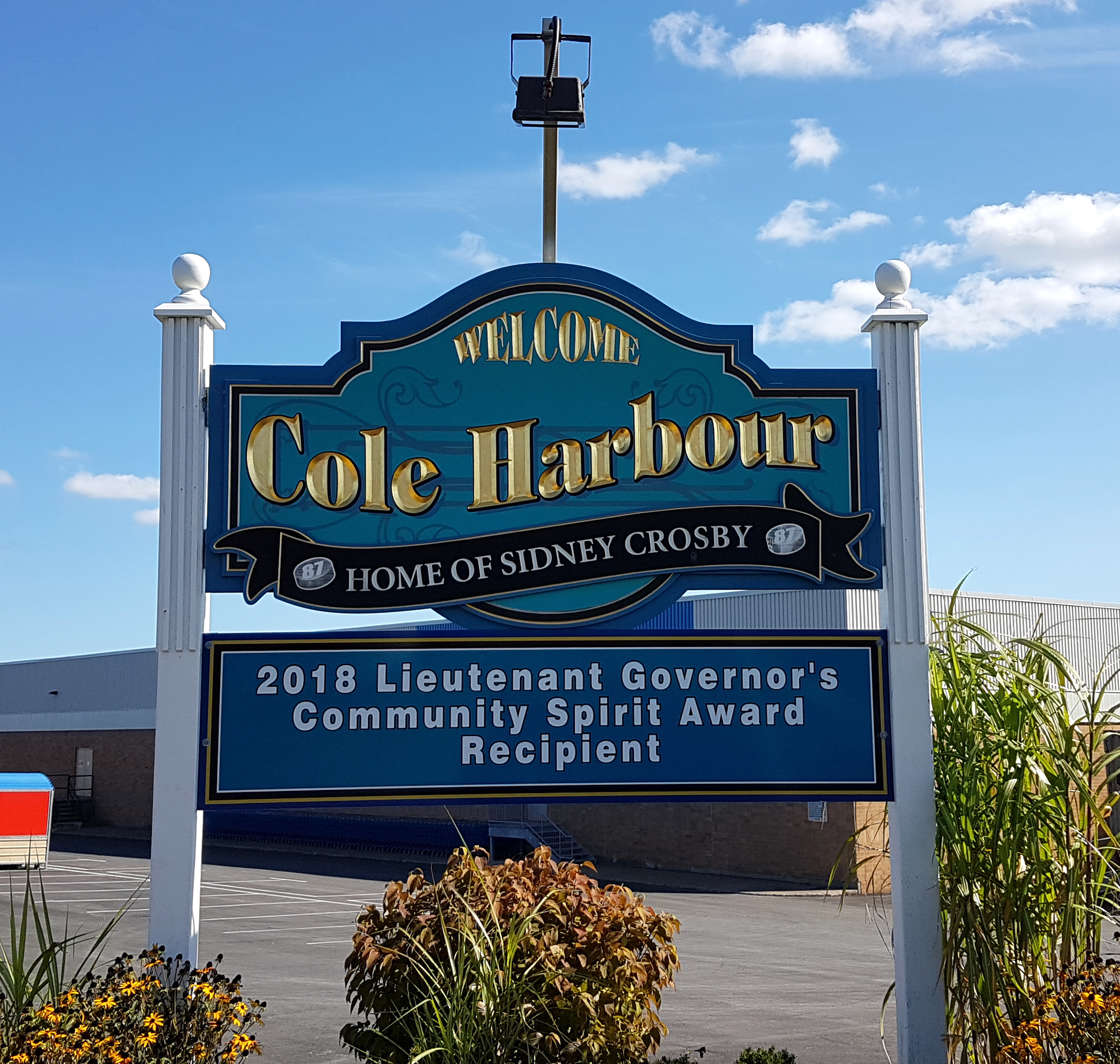
"Home of Sidney Crosby" city sign in Cole Harbour.

Crosby rarely discusses his personal life and avoids social media. Andy O'Brien, Crosby's fitness trainer for over 15 years, has said: "He [Crosby] wants to be one of the guys and doesn't really seek to separate himself or get special treatment in any way... He takes a lot of enjoyment in the regular, simple things in life and having a normal, ordinary routine". Greg Powers described Crosby as essentially the brother of Lemieux's son Austin, as he lived with Lemieux's family in Sewickley, Pennsylvania, from 2005 until 2010. In May 2010, Crosby purchased his own home in the same area. In June 2006, he had bought his first house on Grand Lake in Halifax, Nova Scotia.

Crosby has a younger sister named Taylor who is a hockey goaltender. Like her brother, she went to high school at Shattuck-Saint Mary's in Faribault, Minnesota, to play with the school's hockey program. In 2014, Taylor joined the Northeastern Huskies women's ice hockey team as a freshman at Northeastern University in Boston. In 2015, she transferred to Minnesota's St. Cloud State University and played with the St. Cloud State Huskies women's ice hockey team through to graduation at the end of the 2017–18 school year.

Crosby continues to be active in the community in Cole Harbour, Nova Scotia. He created the Sidney Crosby Foundation in 2009, an organization committed to helping charities benefiting children. In 2015, he started a hockey school in Cole Harbour. His "Little Penguins Program" has provided free equipment and lessons to more than ten thousand local youngsters in Pittsburgh.

On May 29, 2010, it was announced that Crosby would sign the richest endorsement contract in NHL history with Reebok, expected to pay Crosby $1.4 million per year for five to seven years. In 2015, he signed a six-year endorsement contract with Adidas. Crosby also has endorsement deals with Bell, Tim Hortons, and Gatorade. Regarded as one of Canada's "legendary goal-scorers and storied leaders", Crosby was featured in Canada Post's NHL Great Canadian Forwards stamp collection, alongside Phil Esposito, Guy Lafleur, Darryl Sittler, Mark Messier, and Steve Yzerman.

In September 2016, he won an Emmy Award for his role in There's No Place Like Home With Sidney Crosby. He also won for his participation in the Merci Sidney video that followed his return to Rimouski for his QMJHL jersey retirement ceremony.

== Career statistics ==
Biographical information and career statistics from NHL.com, or Eliteprospects.com, or ESPN.com, or Eurohockey.com, or Hockey-Reference.com, or The Internet Hockey Database.

=== Regular season and playoffs ===
Bold indicates led league

			Regular season					Playoffs
Season	Team	League	GP	G	A	Pts	PIM	GP	G	A	Pts	PIM
1999–00	Cole Harbour Red Wings	Peewee AAA	≈70	—	—	≈200	—	—	—	—	—	—
1999–00	Cole Harbour Red Wings	Bantam AAA	1	1	3	4	—	—	—	—	—	—
2000–01	Cole Harbour Red Wings	Bantam AAA	63	86	96	182	—	5	10	6	16	—
2001–02	Dartmouth Subways	Midget AAA	74	95	98	193	114	7	11	13	24	0
2001–02	Truro Bearcats	MJAHL	2	0	1	1	0	—	—	—	—	—
2002–03	Shattuck St. Mary's	Midget AAA	57	72	90	162	104	—	—	—	—	—
2003–04	Rimouski Océanic	QMJHL	59	54	81	135	74	9	7	9	16	10
2004–05	Rimouski Océanic	QMJHL	62	66	102	168	84	13	14	17	31	16
2005–06	Pittsburgh Penguins	NHL	81	39	63	102	110	—	—	—	—	—
2006–07	Pittsburgh Penguins	NHL	79	36	84	**120**	60	5	3	2	5	4
2007–08	Pittsburgh Penguins	NHL	53	24	48	72	39	20	6	**21**	**27**	12
2008–09	Pittsburgh Penguins	NHL	77	33	70	103	76	24	**15**	16	31	14
2009–10	Pittsburgh Penguins	NHL	81	**51**	58	109	69	13	6	13	19	6
2010–11	Pittsburgh Penguins	NHL	41	32	34	66	31	—	—	—	—	—
2011–12	Pittsburgh Penguins	NHL	22	8	29	37	14	6	3	5	8	9
2012–13	Pittsburgh Penguins	NHL	36	15	41	56	16	14	7	8	15	8
2013–14	Pittsburgh Penguins	NHL	80	36	**68**	**104**	46	13	1	8	9	4
2014–15	Pittsburgh Penguins	NHL	77	28	56	84	47	5	2	2	4	0
2015–16	Pittsburgh Penguins	NHL	80	36	49	85	42	24	6	13	19	4
2016–17	Pittsburgh Penguins	NHL	75	**44**	45	89	24	24	8	**19**	27	10
2017–18	Pittsburgh Penguins	NHL	82	29	60	89	46	12	9	12	21	6
2018–19	Pittsburgh Penguins	NHL	79	35	65	100	36	4	0	1	1	2
2019–20	Pittsburgh Penguins	NHL	41	16	31	47	15	4	2	1	3	0
2020–21	Pittsburgh Penguins	NHL	55	24	38	62	26	6	1	1	2	2
2021–22	Pittsburgh Penguins	NHL	69	31	53	84	32	6	2	8	10	2
2022–23	Pittsburgh Penguins	NHL	82	33	60	93	52	—	—	—	—	—
2023–24	Pittsburgh Penguins	NHL	82	42	52	94	40	—	—	—	—	—
2024–25	Pittsburgh Penguins	NHL	80	33	58	91	31	—	—	—	—	—
2025–26	Pittsburgh Penguins	NHL	68	29	45	74	44	6	1	4	5	6
NHL totals			1,420	654	1,107	1,761	898	186	72	134	206	89

- _{1999–2000 stats are from "Age-old question: Cole Harbour hockey association bars peewee player from bantam tourney". The Halifax Daily News. April 5, 2000.}

=== International ===
Year	Team	Event	Result	GP	G	A	Pts	PIM
2003	Canada	U18	4th	5	4	2	6	10
2004	Canada	WJC	2nd place, silver medalist(s)	6	2	3	5	4
2005	Canada	WJC	1st place, gold medalist(s)	6	6	3	9	4
2006	Canada	WC	4th	9	8	8	16	10
2010	Canada	OLY	1st place, gold medalist(s)	7	4	3	7	4
2014	Canada	OLY	1st place, gold medalist(s)	6	1	2	3	0
2015	Canada	WC	1st place, gold medalist(s)	9	4	7	11	2
2016	Canada	WCH	1st place, gold medalist(s)	6	3	7	10	0
2025	Canada	4NF	1st place, gold medalist(s)	4	1	4	5	2
2025	Canada	WC	5th	8	4	8	12	6
2026	Canada	OLY	2nd place, silver medalist(s)	4	2	4	6	0
2026	Canada	WC	4th	10	1	9	10	2
Junior totals				17	12	8	20	18
Senior totals				63	28	52	80	26

== Honours and achievements ==
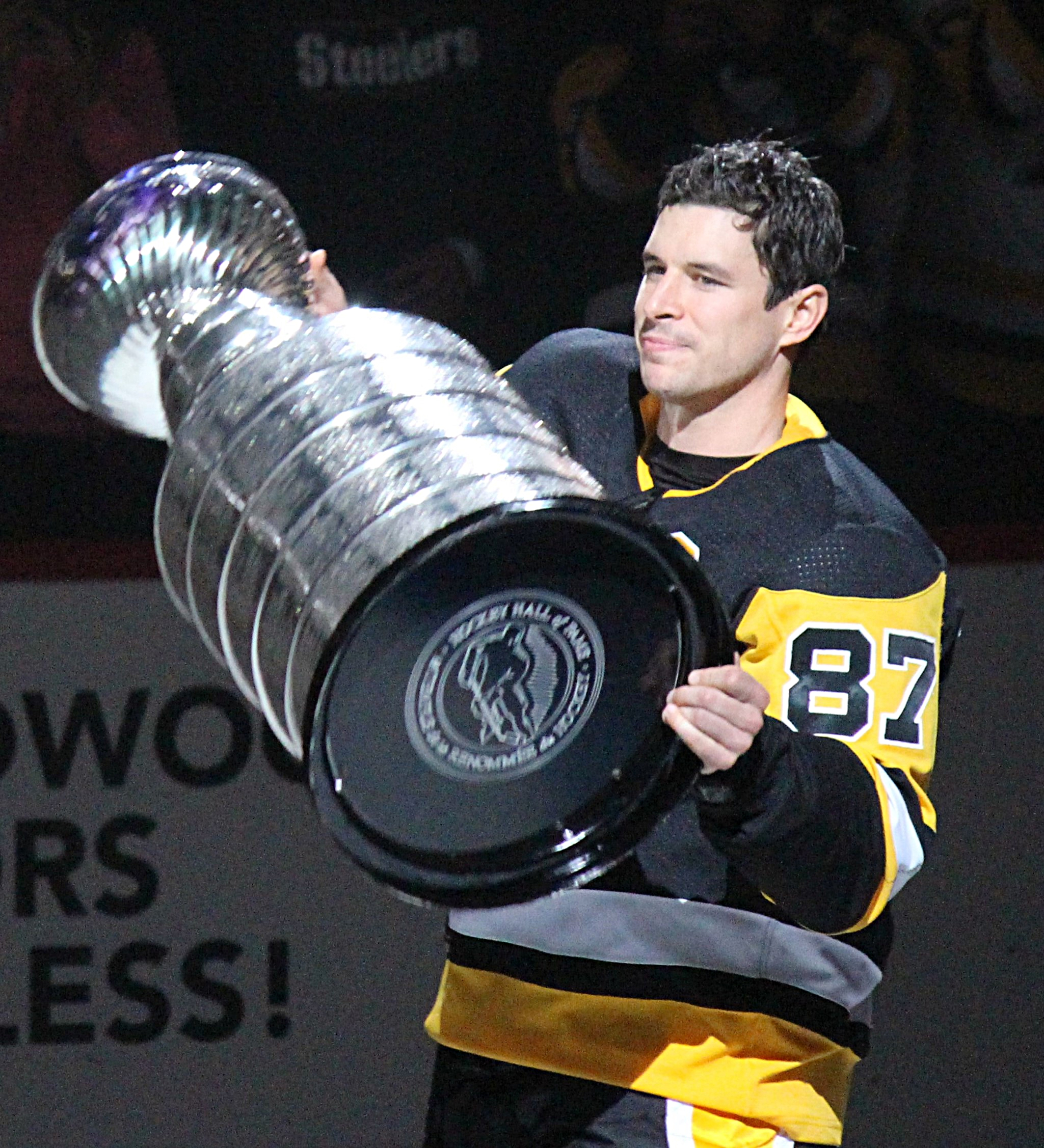
Crosby holding the Stanley Cup during Penguins' home opener of the 2017–18 NHL season

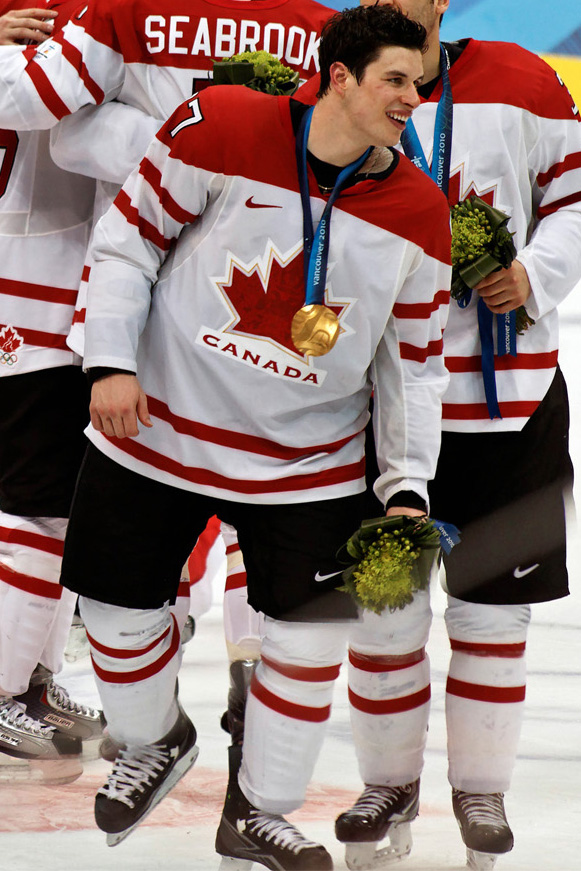
Crosby with an Olympic gold medal following the 2010 Winter Olympics.

Award / honour	Year
NHL
NHL All-Rookie Team	2006
NHL All-Star Game	2007, 2008, 2009, 2011, 2015, 2017, 2018, 2019, 2023, 2024
Art Ross Trophy	2007, 2014
Hart Memorial Trophy	2007, 2014
Ted Lindsay Award	2007, 2013, 2014
Mark Messier Leadership Award	2007, 2010
NHL First All-Star team	2007, 2013, 2014, 2016
Stanley Cup champion	2009, 2016, 2017
NHL 2000s All-Decade second team	2009
Maurice "Rocket" Richard Trophy	2010, 2017
NHL Second All-Star team	2010, 2015, 2017, 2019
Conn Smythe Trophy	2016, 2017
NHL All-Star Game SuperSkills Competition Accuracy Winner	2017
NHL All-Star Game Most Valuable Player	2019
NHL 2010s All-Decade first team	2020
NHL Quarter-Century Pittsburgh Penguins First Team	2025
NHL Quarter Century Team	2025
NHL Quarter-Century Team Fan Vote	2025
Best NHL Player ESPY Award	2007, 2008, 2009, 2010, 2013, 2014, 2016, 2017
Pittsburgh Penguins
Michel Brière Rookie of the Year Award	2006
Most Valuable Player Award	2006, 2007, 2010, 2013, 2014, 2016, 2017, 2019, 2021
A.T. Caggiano Memorial Booster Club Award	2006, 2007, 2010, 2013, 2014
Aldege "Baz" Bastien Memorial Good Guy Award	2006, 2009, 2010
The Edward J. DeBartolo Community Service Award	2010, 2016, 2017
Players' Player Award	2018, 2019, 2021
International
World Championship best forward	2006
World Championship All-Star team	2006
World Cup of Hockey Most Valuable Player	2016
IIHF All-Time Canada Team	2020
IIHF All-Decade Team	2010–2020
CHL / QMJHL
President's Cup champion	2004
RDS/JVC Trophy	2004
QMJHL All-Rookie Team	2004
Michel Bergeron Trophy	2004
CHL Rookie of the Year	2004
QMJHL first All-Star team	2004, 2005
Michel Brière Memorial Trophy	2004, 2005
Jean Béliveau Trophy	2004, 2005
Paul Dumont Trophy	2004, 2005
Offensive Player of the Year	2004, 2005
CHL first All-Star team	2004, 2005
CHL Player of the Year	2004, 2005
CHL Top Scorer Award	2004, 2005
Canada Post Cup	2004, 2005
Guy Lafleur Trophy	2005
Mike Bossy Trophy	2005
Top Pro Prospect	2005
Memorial Cup All-Star team	2005
Ed Chynoweth Trophy	2005
Rimouski Océanic and Quebec Major Junior Hockey League retired jersey #87	2019
Minor
Nova Scotia Major Midget Hockey League champion	2002
Air Canada Cup Tournament MVP Award	2002
Air Canada Cup Top Scorer Award	2002
Air Canada Cup Scholarship	2002
USA Hockey National Midget champion	2003
Other awards
Dapper Dan Sportsman of the Year	2006, 2007, 2017
Sporting News, NHL Player of the Year	2007
ESPY Award, NHL Player of the Year	2007, 2008, 2009, 2010, 2013, 2014, 2016, 2017
Lou Marsh Trophy	2007, 2009
Lionel Conacher Award (Canadian male athlete of the year)	2007, 2009, 2010
Order of Nova Scotia	2008
AIF Chairman's Award for leadership in community and charitable activities	2008
ESPN, Top Ten NHL Players of the Decade (2000–2009)	2009
Sporting News, Top 50 Players in Today's NHL (Ranked No. 1)	2009
Sporting News, Top Under-25 Athlete	2010
The Sports Network, Hockey's Top 50 (Ranked No. 1)	2010, 2011, 2012, 2013, 2014, 2015, 2016
The Hockey News, Saku Koivu Award (Comeback Player)	2013
The Hockey News, Mario Lemieux Award (Best Player)	2013, 2014
Queen Elizabeth II Diamond Jubilee Medal	2013
The Hockey News, Wayne Gretzky Award (MVP)	2014, 2016
Triple Gold Club	2015
ESPN, Top 20 Athletes 1995–2015 (Ranked No. 20)	2015
Mid-Atlantic Emmy Award, Best Sports One-Time Special	2016, 2020
Sporting News, NHL Athlete of the Decade	2010–2020
ESPN, NHL's All-Decade Awards: MVP	2010–2020
Order of Canada	2022

== Records ==
=== IIHF ===
- Youngest player to win a World Championship scoring title

=== Pittsburgh Penguins ===
==== Regular Season ====
- Most career points (1,761)
- Most career assists (1,107)
- Most career games played (1,420)
- Most career seasons played (21)
- Most career overtime points (50)
- Most career overtime goals (25)
- Most career shootout goals (48)
- Most career shootout-deciding goals (21)
- Most shootout attempts (128)
- Most career game-winning goals (104)
- Most multi-point games (517)
- Most career 20-goal seasons (18)
- Most career 30-goal seasons (13)
- Most assists in a season by a rookie (63, in 2005–06)
- Most points in a season by a rookie (102, in 2005–06)
- Most multi-point games in a season by a rookie (29, in 2005–06, tied with Mario Lemieux)
- Most 3-point games in a season by a rookie (11, in 2005–06)
- Most 4-point games in a season by a rookie (3, in 2005–06)
- Longest assist streak in a season by a rookie (6 games, in 2005–06, tied with 3 others)
- Longest point streak from the start of career (6 games, in 2005–06, tied with Evgeni Malkin)
- Most shootout deciding goals in a season (4, in 2006–07 and 2009–10)
- Most shootout goals in a season (8, in 2009–10, tied with 2 others)
- Most overtime goals in a season (4, in 2024–25)

==== Playoffs ====
- Most career points (206)
- Most career assists (134)
- Most career games played (186)
- Most career years in the playoffs (16, tied with Evgeni Malkin)
- Most consecutive years in the playoffs (11, tied with 2 others)
- Most career multi-point games (69)
- Most career multi-assist games (33)
- Most career hat-tricks (3, tied with Mario Lemieux)
- Most assists in a game (4, tied with 6 others)

=== NHL ===
- First rookie to record 100 points and 100 penalty minutes in a season
- Youngest player to record 100 points in a season (18 years, 253 days)
- Youngest player to record 200 career points (19 years and 207 days)
- Youngest player to record 2 consecutive 100-point seasons (19 years, 215 days).
- Youngest player voted to the starting line-up in an All-Star Game
- Youngest Art Ross Trophy and Lester B. Pearson Award winner
- Youngest player to be named to the first All-Star team
- Youngest player to lead NHL playoffs in scoring (20 years, 9 months, and 28 days)
- Youngest NHL captain to win Stanley Cup (21 years, 10 months, and 5 days)
- Fewest games played by an NHL team's leading scorer (66 points in 41 games, in 2010–11)
- Most seasons averaging at least 1 point per game: (21)
- Most consecutive seasons averaging at least 1 point per game: (21)
- Longest tenured captain of a team (20 seasons)

=== Olympics ===
- First male player to captain Team Canada at the Olympics twice

== See also ==
- List of Pittsburgh Penguins players
- List of NHL players with 50 goal seasons
- List of NHL players with 100-point seasons
- List of NHL players with 1,000 points
- List of NHL players with 1,000 games played
- List of NHL players with 500 goals

== Notes ==
Sporting positions
Preceded by Mario Lemieux	Pittsburgh Penguins captain 2007–present	Incumbent
Awards and achievements
Preceded by Alexander Ovechkin	NHL first overall draft pick 2005	Succeeded by Erik Johnson
Preceded by Evgeni Malkin	Pittsburgh Penguins first-round draft pick 2005	Succeeded by Jordan Staal
Preceded by Corey Locke	CHL Player of the Year; 2004, 2005	Succeeded by Alexander Radulov
Preceded by Joe Thornton; Martin St. Louis	Winner of the Art Ross Trophy; 2007; 2014	Succeeded by Alexander Ovechkin; Jamie Benn
Preceded by Jaromír Jágr	Winner of the Lester B. Pearson Award; 2007	Succeeded by Alexander Ovechkin
Preceded by Joe Thornton; Alexander Ovechkin	Winner of the Hart Memorial Trophy; 2007; 2014	Succeeded by Alexander Ovechkin; Carey Price
Preceded by Steve Nash; Justin Morneau	Winner of the Lionel Conacher Award; 2007; 2009, 2010	Succeeded by Justin Morneau; Patrick Chan
Preceded by Alexander Ovechkin	Winner of the Rocket Richard Trophy; 2010; With: Steven Stamkos	Succeeded by Corey Perry
Preceded by Evgeni Malkin	Winner of the Ted Lindsay Award; 2013, 2014	Succeeded by Carey Price
Preceded by Duncan Keith	Winner of the Conn Smythe Trophy; 2016, 2017	Succeeded by Alexander Ovechkin
Preceded by Jaromír Jágr	Best NHL Player ESPY Award; 2007, 2008, 2009, 2010	Succeeded by Tim Thomas
