= Andrew Gordon (ice hockey) =

Canadian ice hockey player (born 1985)

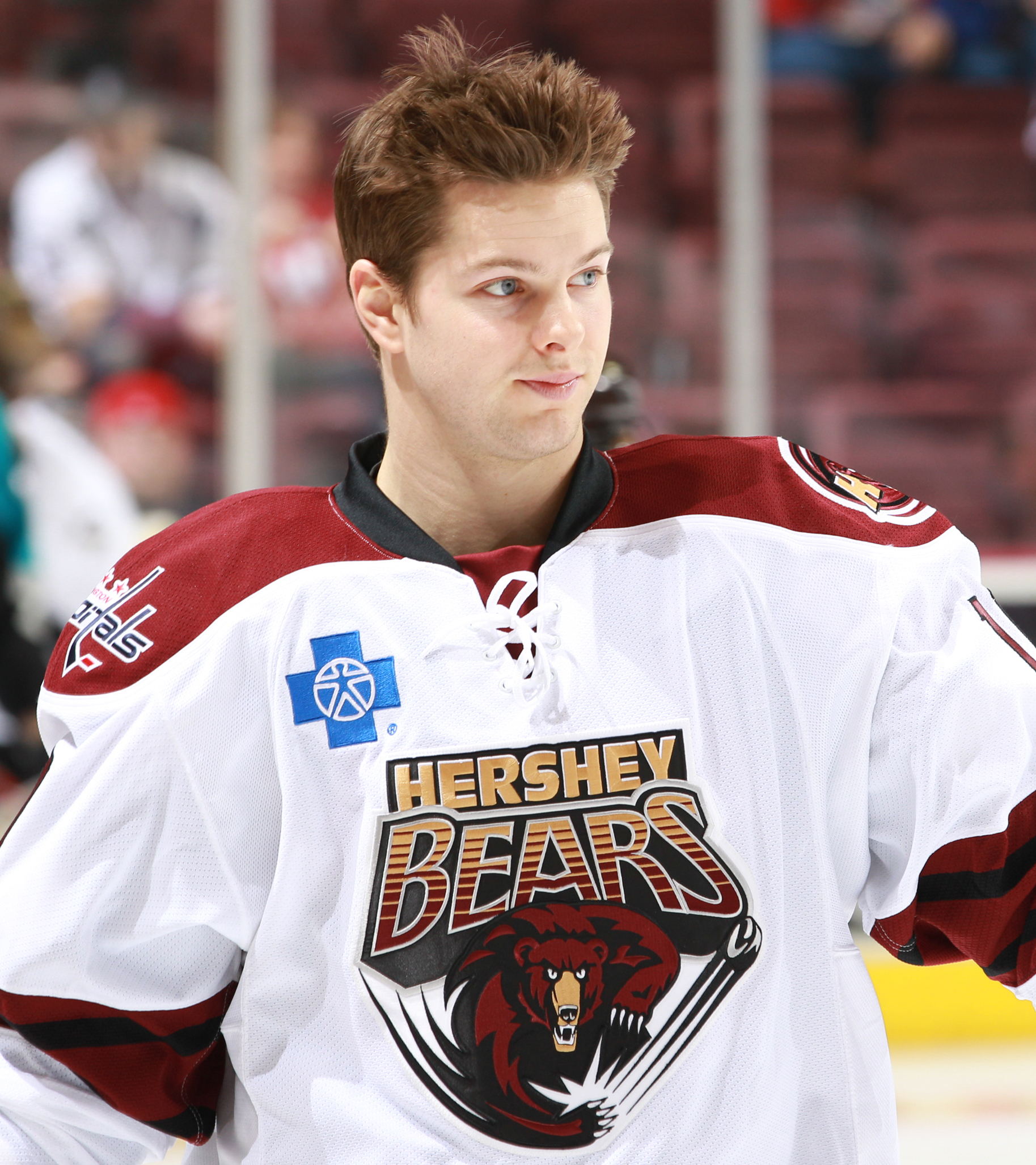
- Born: December 13, 1985 (age 40) Halifax, Nova Scotia, Canada
- Height: 5 ft 11 in (180 cm)
- Weight: 180 lb (82 kg; 12 st 12 lb)
- Position: Right wing
- Shot: Right
- Played for: Washington Capitals; Anaheim Ducks; Vancouver Canucks; Linköping HC; Lukko; Graz 99ers
- NHL draft: 197th overall, 2004; Washington Capitals
- Playing career: 2007–2022

Andrew Jacob Gordon (born December 13, 1985) is a Canadian former professional ice hockey right winger who currently works for the Ottawa Senators as an amateur scout. He played in the National Hockey League (NHL) with the Washington Capitals, Anaheim Ducks and the Vancouver Canucks.

== Playing career ==
Gordon was born and raised in Nova Scotia, where he also played his minor hockey. He was a member of the Dartmouth Subways Midget 'AAA' team that won the silver medal at the 2002 Air Canada Cup, Canada's national midget championship. The next season, Gordon joined the Notre Dame Hounds of the Saskatchewan Junior Hockey League. In 2004, he was drafted by the Washington Capitals (7th round, 197th overall). However, instead of immediately joining the Capitals, he played for three years with the St. Cloud State Huskies in the Western Collegiate Hockey Association.

Gordon spent his first professional season (2007–08) with the American Hockey League's Hershey Bears and the ECHL's South Carolina Stingrays, though he spent most of the year with Hershey. The next year, he scored twenty goals with Hershey and helped them win the Calder Cup. He also made his NHL debut with the Capitals, playing in one game for them. In 2009–10, he had an even better year, scoring thirty-seven goals, and the Bears won the Calder Cup for the second year in a row. He also played in two games for the Capitals.

In the 2010–11 season Gordon made it to final cuts of the Capitals training camp but was reassigned to Hershey along with Jay Beagle and Mathieu Perreault. Gordon played in Hershey until mid-December when he was called up for a game against the New York Rangers.

On 21 December 2010, Gordon scored his first NHL goal for the Capitals against Martin Brodeur of the New Jersey Devils. After scoring, Gordon kissed his linemate Marcus Johansson on the cheek as they sat on the bench.

He was later sent back down to Hershey and played until being recalled once again in January when Capitals winger Eric Fehr got hurt.

On July 2, 2011, he was signed by the Ducks to a two-year deal. During the 2011–12 season Gordon was traded to the Vancouver Canucks for defenceman Sebastian Erixon. He made his Canucks debut on March 21, 2013, in a game in Phoenix.

After becoming an unrestricted free agent at season's end, Gordon signed a one-year contract with the Winnipeg Jets on July 6, 2013. He was assigned to AHL affiliate, the St. John's IceCaps for the entirety of the 2013–14 season, helping the club reach the Calder Cup finals for the first time in franchise history.

On July 2, 2014, he was signed as a free agent to a one-year, two-way contract with the Philadelphia Flyers.

On June 3, 2015, Gordon signed with Linköpings HC of the Swedish Hockey League.

== Career statistics ==
			Regular season					Playoffs
Season	Team	League	GP	G	A	Pts	PIM	GP	G	A	Pts	PIM
2002–03	Notre Dame Hounds	SJHL	58	20	27	47	12	—	—	—	—	—
2003–04	Notre Dame Hounds	SJHL	55	20	44	64	12	—	—	—	—	—
2004–05	St. Cloud State Huskies	WCHA	38	9	8	17	6	—	—	—	—	—
2005–06	St. Cloud State Huskies	WCHA	42	20	20	40	22	—	—	—	—	—
2006–07	St. Cloud State Huskies	WCHA	40	22	23	45	16	—	—	—	—	—
2007–08	Hershey Bears	AHL	58	16	35	51	39	5	3	2	5	2
2007–08	South Carolina Stingrays	ECHL	11	8	6	14	6	9	5	3	8	8
2008–09	Hershey Bears	AHL	80	21	24	45	47	22	6	4	10	6
2008–09	Washington Capitals	NHL	1	0	0	0	0	—	—	—	—	—
2009–10	Hershey Bears	AHL	79	37	34	71	57	17	13	7	20	2
2009–10	Washington Capitals	NHL	2	0	0	0	0	—	—	—	—	—
2010–11	Hershey Bears	AHL	50	28	29	57	24	2	0	1	1	6
2010–11	Washington Capitals	NHL	9	1	1	2	0	—	—	—	—	—
2011–12	Anaheim Ducks	NHL	37	2	3	5	6	—	—	—	—	—
2011–12	Syracuse Crunch	AHL	19	3	5	8	10	—	—	—	—	—
2011–12	Chicago Wolves	AHL	10	2	1	3	10	—	—	—	—	—
2012–13	Chicago Wolves	AHL	54	19	13	32	49	—	—	—	—	—
2012–13	Vancouver Canucks	NHL	6	0	0	0	0	—	—	—	—	—
2013–14	St. John's IceCaps	AHL	76	23	33	56	43	21	8	11	19	22
2014–15	Lehigh Valley Phantoms	AHL	76	18	24	42	22	—	—	—	—	—
2015–16	Linköping HC	SHL	52	18	26	44	30	4	1	2	3	4
2016–17	Linköping HC	SHL	50	8	16	24	16	6	1	1	2	4
2017–18	Linköping HC	SHL	47	16	10	26	37	7	3	4	7	2
2018–19	Lukko	Liiga	7	2	3	5	12	—	—	—	—	—
2018–19	Linköping HC	SHL	47	10	17	27	16	—	—	—	—	—
2019–20	Linköping HC	SHL	28	8	11	19	12	—	—	—	—	—
2020–21	Linköping HC	SHL	37	5	7	12	30	—	—	—	—	—
2021–22	Graz 99ers	ICEHL	47	12	21	33	30	1	0	0	0	0
NHL totals			55	3	4	7	6	—	—	—	—	—
SHL totals			261	65	87	152	141	17	5	7	12	10

== Awards and honours ==
Award	Year
College
All-WCHA First Team	2007
