= 2002 Air Canada Cup =

Tournament details
- Venue: K. C. Irving Regional Centre in Bathurst, NB
- Dates: April 22–28, 2002
- Teams: 6

Final positions
- Champions: Tisdale Trojans
- Runners-up: Dartmouth Subways
- Third place: Riverains du Collège Charles-Lemoyne

Tournament statistics
- Scoring leader: Sidney Crosby (11G 13A 24P)

Awards
- MVP: Sidney Crosby

The 2002 Air Canada Cup was Canada's 24th annual national midget 'AAA' hockey championship, played April 22–28, 2002 at the K. C. Irving Regional Centre in Bathurst, New Brunswick. The Tisdale Trojans from Saskatchewan defeated the Dartmouth Subways from Nova Scotia 6-2 in the gold medal game to win the national title.

This season's Air Canada Cup gained extra attention from media and hockey scouts as 14-year-old prodigy Sidney Crosby competed as a member of the Dartmouth Subways. He led them to a berth in the championship game, the first time that a team from Atlantic Canada had ever advanced to the gold medal game. Crosby led the round robin in scoring with 18 points in five games and was named the Most Valuable Player. Other notable players competing at the 2002 Air Canada Cup were Olivier Latendresse, Guillaume Latendresse, Andrew Gordon, Shaun Heshka, Tyson Strachan, Jay Rosehill, and Torrey Mitchell.

== Teams ==
Result	Team	Region	City
1st place, gold medalist(s)	Tisdale Trojans	West	Tisdale, SK
2nd place, silver medalist(s)	Dartmouth Subways	Atlantic	Dartmouth, NS
3rd place, bronze medalist(s)	Riverains du Collège Charles-Lemoyne	Quebec	Sainte-Catherine, QC
4	Red Deer Chiefs	Pacific	Red Deer, AB
5	Timmins Majors	Central	Timmins, ON
6	Miramichi Rivermen	Host	Miramichi, NB

== Round robin ==
=== Standings ===
Pos	Team	Pld	W	L	D	GF	GA	GD	Pts
1	Red Deer Chiefs	5	4	1	0	31	20	+11	8
2	Riverains du Collège Charles-Lemoyne	5	3	1	1	28	13	+15	7
3	Tisdale Trojans	5	3	2	0	16	13	+3	6
4	Dartmouth Subways	5	2	2	1	23	22	+1	5
5	Timmins Majors	5	2	3	0	19	27	−8	4
6	Miramichi Rivermen	5	0	5	0	12	36	−24	0

=== Scores ===
- Red Deer 9 - Timmins 2
- Collège Charles-Lemoyne 3 - Tisdale 2
- Dartmouth 8 - Miramichi 2
- Dartmouth 3 - Collège Charles-Lemoyne 3
- Tisdale 3 - Timmins 0
- Red Deer 8 - Miramichi 3
- Timmins 7 - Collège Charles-Lemoyne 5
- Red Deer 8 - Dartmouth 6
- Tisale 3 - Miramichi 2
- Dartmouth 5 - Timmins 4
- Red Deer 5 - Tisdale 3
- Collège Charles-Lemoyne 10 - Miramichi 0
- Tisdale 5 - Dartmouth 1
- Collège Charles-Lemoyne 6 - Red Deer 1
- Timmins 6 - Miramichi 5

== Playoffs ==
=== Semi-finals ===
- Dartmouth 5 - Red Deer 4
- Tisdale 4 - Collège Charles-Lemoyne 1

=== Bronze-medal game ===
- Collège Charles-Lemoyne 6 - Red Deer 4

=== Gold-medal game ===
- Tisdale 6 - Dartmouth 2

== Individual awards ==
- Most Valuable Player: Sidney Crosby (Dartmouth)
- Top Scorer: Sidney Crosby (Dartmouth)
- Top Forward: Olivier Latendresse (Collège Charles-Lemoyne)
- Top Defenseman: Shaun Heshka (Tisdale)
- Top Goaltender: François Thuot (Collège Charles-Lemoyne)
- Most Sportsmanlike Player: Andrew Gordon (Dartmouth)

== Regional Playdowns ==
=== Atlantic Region ===
- The Dartmouth Subways advanced by winning their regional tournament, which was played April 3–7, 2002 at the Community Gardens Arena Complex in Kensington, Prince Edward Island.

=== Quebec ===
- The Riverains du Collège Charles-Lemoyne advanced by capturing the Quebec Midget AAA League title.

=== Central Region ===
- The Timmins Majors advanced by winning their regional tournament, which was played April 2–7, 2002 at the McIntyre Community Building in Timmins, Ontario.

=== West Region ===
- The Tisdale Trojans advanced by winning their regional tournament, which was played April 3–7, 2002 at the T.G. Smith Centre in Steinbach, Manitoba.

=== Pacific Region ===
- The Red Deer Chiefs advanced by winning their regional tournament, which was played April 3–7, 2002 in Yellowknife, Northwest Territories.

== See also ==
- Telus Cup
