= 2001–02 QMJHL season =

Canadian junior ice hockey season

- League: Quebec Major Junior Hockey League
- Sport: Hockey
- Duration: Regular season Sept. 13, 2001 – Mar. 19, 2002; Playoffs; March 21 – May 12, 2002
- Teams: 16

Draft
- Top draft pick: Steve Bernier
- Picked by: Moncton Wildcats

Regular season
- Jean Rougeau Trophy: Acadie–Bathurst Titan (1)
- Season MVP: Pierre-Marc Bouchard (Chicoutimi Saguenéens)
- Top scorer: Pierre-Marc Bouchard (Chicoutimi Saguenéens)

Playoffs
- Playoffs MVP: Danny Groulx (Tigres)
- Finals champions: Victoriaville Tigres (1)
- Runners-up: Acadie–Bathurst Titan

QMJHL seasons
- 2000–01 2002–03

2001–02 CHL season
- League: Canadian Hockey League
- Sport: Hockey
- Duration: OHL; Sept. 2001 – Mar. 2002; QMJHL; Sept. 13, 2001 – Mar. 19, 2001; WHL; Sept. 2001 – Mar. 2002
- Teams: 60
- Season MVP: Pierre-Marc Bouchard (Chicoutimi Saguenéens) (QMJHL)
- Top scorer: Pierre-Marc Bouchard (Chicoutimi Saguenéens) (QMJHL)

Memorial Cup
- Finals champions: Kootenay Ice (WHL) (1st title)
- Runners-up: Victoriaville Tigres (QMJHL)

The 2001–02 QMJHL season was the 33rd season in the history of the Quebec Major Junior Hockey League. The league inaugurates the Luc Robitaille Trophy for the team that scored the most goals during the regular season. Sixteen teams played 72 games each in the schedule. The Acadie-Bathurst Titan finished first overall in the regular season winning their first Jean Rougeau Trophy since relocating from Laval. The Victoriaville Tigres won their first President's Cup since relocating from Longueuil, by defeating the Acadie-Bathurst Titan in the finals.

== Final standings ==
Note: GP = Games played; W = Wins; L = Losses; T = Ties; OTL = Overtime loss; Pts = Points; GF = Goals for; GA = Goals against

=== Lebel Conference ===
West Division	GP	W	L	T	OTL	Pts	GF	GA
y-Hull Olympiques	72	33	30	3	6	75	230	253
x-Val-d'Or Foreurs	72	28	35	5	4	65	230	257
x-Rouyn-Noranda Huskies	72	26	36	6	4	62	232	281
x-Montreal Rocket	72	23	39	8	2	56	198	243
Central Division	GP	W	L	T	OTL	Pts	GF	GA
z-Shawinigan Cataractes	72	43	21	5	3	94	288	200
x-Victoriaville Tigres	72	40	25	6	1	87	287	257
x-Drummondville Voltigeurs	72	31	35	6	0	68	255	264
Sherbrooke Castors	72	21	43	7	1	50	231	284

=== Dilio Conference ===
East Division	GP	W	L	T	OTL	Pts	GF	GA
y-Chicoutimi Saguenéens	72	40	27	1	4	85	278	269
x-Baie-Comeau Drakkar	72	38	25	7	2	85	288	231
x-Rimouski Océanic	72	33	33	4	2	72	270	293
x-Quebec Remparts	72	31	32	7	2	71	212	260
Maritime Division	GP	W	L	T	OTL	Pts	GF	GA
z-Acadie-Bathurst Titan	72	45	18	4	5	99	257	225
x-Halifax Mooseheads	72	39	21	9	3	90	267	197
x-Cape Breton Screaming Eagles	72	38	20	10	4	90	286	224
Moncton Wildcats	72	20	41	4	7	51	214	287

- complete list of standings.

== Scoring leaders ==
Note: GP = Games played; G = Goals; A = Assists; Pts = Points; PIM = Penalty minutes

Player	Team	GP	G	A	Pts	PIM
Pierre-Marc Bouchard	Chicoutimi Saguenéens	69	46	94	140	54
Matthew Lombardi	Victoriaville Tigres	66	57	73	130	70
Yanick Lehoux	Baie-Comeau Drakkar	66	56	69	125	63
Jonathan Bellemarre	Shawinigan Cataractes	69	39	85	124	183
Charles Linglet	Baie-Comeau Drakkar	72	52	71	123	34
Carl Mallette	Victoriaville Tigres	71	39	83	122	92
Jason Pominville	Shawinigan Cataractes	66	57	64	121	172
Olivier Proulx	Drummondville Voltigeurs	71	42	77	119	179
P. A. Parenteau	Chicoutimi Saguenéens	68	51	67	118	120
Philippe Lacasse	Hull Olympiques	63	55	58	113	58

- complete scoring statistics

== Leading goaltenders ==
Note: GP = Games played; Min = Minutes played; W = Wins; L = Losses; T = Ties; GA = Goals against; SO = Total shutouts; SV% = Save percentage; GAA = Goals against average

Player	Team	GP	Min	W	L	T	GA	SO	SV%	GAA
Jonathan Boutin	Halifax Mooseheads	11	459	4	1	0	18	0	.902	2.35
Olivier Michaud	Shawinigan Cataractes	46	2649	29	10	1	108	3	.887	2.45
Dany Dallaire	Halifax Mooseheads	66	3910	35	20	3	171	3	.915	2.62
Marc-André Fleury	Cape Breton Screaming Eagles	55	3043	26	10	4	141	2	.915	2.78
Adam Russo	Acadie–Bathurst Titan	61	3345	41	14	2	159	4	.899	2.85

== Playoffs ==
Conference Quarterfinals
D2	Chicoutimi	0
D7	Quebec	4
D3	Halifax	4
D6	Rimouski	3
D4	Cape Breton	4
D5	Baie-Comeau	1
L4	Drummondville	4
L5	Val-d'Or	3
L2	Hull	4
L7	Montreal	3
L3	Victoriaville	4
L6	Rouyn-Noranda	0

Conference Semifinals
D1	Acadie-Bathurst	4
D7	Quebec	1
D3	Halifax	2
D4	Cape Breton	4
L1	Shawinigan	4
L4	Drummondville	1
L2	Hull	1
L3	Victoriaville	4

Conference Finals
D1	Acadie-Bathurst	4
D4	Cape Breton	1
L1	Shawinigan	3
L3	Victoriaville	4

Predient's Cup Finals
D1	Acadie-Bathurst	2
L3	Victoriaville	4

=== Conference Quarterfinals ===
==== (D2) Chicoutimi Saguenéens vs. (D7) Quebec Remparts ====
March 21	Chicoutimi Saguenéens	2 – 5	Quebec Remparts	Centre Georges-Vézina
No scoring		First period	David Massé (1) - 19:14
No scoring		Second period	Guillaume Bérubé (1) - 1:04; Yannick Noiseux (1) - pp - 6:09; Tomáš Špila (1) - pp - 19:16
6:12 - pp - Pierre-Marc Bouchard (1); 8:23 - Christian Larrivée (1)		Third period	Josh Hennessy (1) - 16:38
Jeff Deslauriers (23 saves / 28 shots)		Goalie stats	Kevin Lachance (33 saves / 35 shots)

March 24	Chicoutimi Saguenéens	3 – 4	OT	Quebec Remparts	Centre Georges-Vézina
6:04 - pp - P. A. Parenteau (1)		First period		Shawn Collymore (1) - pp - 14:04
No scoring		Second period		David Massé (2) - pp - 1:28
16:23 - pp - P. A. Parenteau (2); 17:53 - Nicolas Marcotte (1)		Third period		Josh Hennessy (2) - 2:40
No scoring		First overtime period		Guillaume Bérubé (2) - 15:05
Jeff Deslauriers (38 saves / 42 shots); Eric Bourbeau (1 save / 1 shot)		Goalie stats		Kevin Lachance (42 saves / 45 shots)

March 26	Quebec Remparts	6 – 5	Chicoutimi Saguenéens	Colisée Pepsi
6:11 - David Massé (3); 18:35 - Chris Montgomery (1)		First period	Michael Lanthier (1) - 12:51; Pierre-Marc Bouchard (2) - pp - 16:57
1:42 - pp - Josh Hennessy (3); 4:37 - Guillaume Bérubé (3); 8:55 - Petr Přeučil (1); 19:58 - pp - Mario Joly (1)		Second period	P. A. Parenteau (3) - pp - 13:26
No scoring		Third period	Christian Larrivée (2) - 4:52; Rosario Ruggeri (1) - pp - 10:08
Kevin Lachance (26 saves / 31 shots)		Goalie stats	Jeff Deslauriers (23 saves / 28 shots); Eric Bourbeau (13 saves / 14 shots)

March 27	Quebec Remparts	6 – 1	Chicoutimi Saguenéens	Colisée Pepsi
1:43 - Chris Montgomery (2); 7:38 - Mark Hurtubise (1); 9:42 - Petr Přeučil (2)		First period	No scoring
1:34 - pp - Shawn Collymore (2); 10:44 - pp - Yannick Noiseux (2); 12:40 - Yannick Noiseux (3)		Second period	No scoring
No scoring		Third period	Stanislav Hudec (1) - pp - 17:21
Kevin Lachance (30 saves / 31 shots)		Goalie stats	Jeff Deslauriers (24 saves / 30 shots); Eric Bourbeau (7 saves / 7 shots)

Quebec wins series 4 – 0

==== (D3) Halifax Mooseheads vs. (D6) Rimouski Océanic ====
March 22	Halifax Mooseheads	3 – 2	Rimouski Océanic	Halifax Metro Centre

March 23	Halifax Mooseheads	2 – 4	Rimouski Océanic	Halifax Metro Centre

March 26	Rimouski Océanic	7 – 5	Halifax Mooseheads	Colisée de Rimouski

March 27	Rimouski Océanic	3 – 4	Halifax Mooseheads	Colisée de Rimouski

March 29	Halifax Mooseheads	4 – 1	Rimouski Océanic	Halifax Metro Centre

March 31	Rimouski Océanic	5 – 4	OT	Halifax Mooseheads	Colisée de Rimouski

April 2	Halifax Mooseheads	2 – 0	Rimouski Océanic	Halifax Metro Centre

Halifax wins series 4 – 3

==== (D4) Cape Breton Screaming Eagles vs. (D7) Baie-Comeau Drakkar ====
March 22	Cape Breton Screaming Eagles	5 – 7	Baie-Comeau Drakkar	Centre 200
14:12 - Pierre-Luc Laprise (1); 18:26 - pp - David Cloutier (1)		First period	Robin Leblanc (1) - 9:57; Jean-François Jacques (1) - 10:35
No scoring		Second period	Yanick Lehoux (1) - pp - 2:37; Alexandre Morel (1) - pp - 9:57; Joël Perrault (1) - sh - 12:16
5:52 - Pierre-Luc Émond (1); 10:22 - pp - David Cloutier (2); 17:51 - David Cloutier (3)		Third period	Benoît Mondou (1) - 13:07; Yanick Lehoux (2) - en - 19:25
Marc-André Fleury (41 saves / 47 shots)		Goalie stats	Ghyslain Rousseau (25 saves / 30 shots)

March 23	Cape Breton Screaming Eagles	4 – 3	OT	Baie-Comeau Drakkar	Centre 200
0:55 - Pierre-Luc Émond (2); 10:09 - Dominic Noël (1); 12:10 - George Davis (1)		First period		Pascal Pelletier (1) - 8:47
No scoring		Second period		Joël Perrault (2) - 18:16; Charles Linglet (1) - 19:36
No scoring		Third period		No scoring
11:48 - Jean-François Dufort (1)		First overtime period		No scoring
Marc-André Fleury (32 saves / 35 shots)		Goalie stats		Ghyslain Rousseau (7 saves / 10 shots); Michel Robinson (30 saves / 31 shots)

March 26	Baie-Comeau Drakkar	2 – 3	Cape Breton Screaming Eagles	Centre Henry-Leonard
14:26 - pp - Yanick Lehoux (3); 17:58 - pp - Louis-Philippe Martin (1)		First period	Stuart MacRae (1) - pp - 5:25; Pierre-Luc Laprise (2) - 8:34
No scoring		Second period	Dominic Noël (2) - 15:44
No scoring		Third period	No scoring
Michel Robinson (28 saves / 31 shots)		Goalie stats	Marc-André Fleury (26 saves / 28 shots)

March 27	Baie-Comeau Drakkar	2 – 4	Cape Breton Screaming Eagles	Centre Henry-Leonard
17:09 - Yanick Lehoux (4)		First period	Jean-Philippe Côté (1) - 19:58
No scoring		Second period	Dominic Noël (3) - pp - 6:05; André Martineau (1) - 7:33
Pascal Pelletier (2) - 0:13		Third period	Stephen Dixon (1) - 6:39
Michel Robinson (25 saves / 29 shots)		Goalie stats	Marc-André Fleury (27 saves / 29 shots)

March 29	Cape Breton Screaming Eagles	5 – 4	OT	Baie-Comeau Drakkar	Centre 200
7:26 - pp - Dominic Noël (4); 8:16 - Dominic Noël (5); 11:24 - Maxime Lessard (1)		First period		Duilio Grande (1) - 2:40
15:45 - pp - David Cloutier (4)		Second period		Pascal Pelletier (3) - pp - 5:39; Yanick Lehoux (5) - 19:59
No scoring		Third period		Louis-Philippe Martin (2) - 3:52
4:32 - Pierre-Luc Laprise (3)		First overtime period		No scoring
Marc-André Fleury (34 saves / 38 shots)		Goalie stats		Ghyslain Rousseau (6 saves / 9 shots); Michel Robinson (37 saves / 39 shots)

Cape Breton wins series 4 – 1

==== (D3) Drummondville Voltigeurs vs. (D6) Val-d'Or Foreurs ====
March 22	Drummondville Voltigeurs	6 – 5	OT	Val-d'Or Foreurs	Centre Marcel-Dionne

March 23	Drummondville Voltigeurs	4 – 2	Val-d'Or Foreurs	Centre Marcel-Dionne

March 26	Val-d'Or Foreurs	2 – 1	Drummondville Voltigeurs	Palais des Sports

March 27	Val-d'Or Foreurs	3 – 1	Drummondville Voltigeurs	Palais des Sports

March 29	Drummondville Voltigeurs	3 – 0	Val-d'Or Foreurs	Centre Marcel-Dionne

March 31	Val-d'Or Foreurs	4 – 3	OT	Drummondville Voltigeurs	Palais des Sports

April 2	Drummondville Voltigeurs	6 – 3	Val-d'Or Foreurs	Centre Marcel-Dionne

Drummondville wins series 4 – 3

==== (L2) Hull Olympiques vs. (L7) Montreal Rocket ====
March 22	Hull Olympiques	3 – 1	Montreal Rocket	Centre Robert Guertin

March 23	Hull Olympiques	3 – 4	Montreal Rocket	Centre Robert Guertin

March 25	Montreal Rocket	4 – 1	Hull Olympiques	Aréna Maurice-Richard

March 27	Montreal Rocket	4 – 1	Hull Olympiques	Aréna Maurice-Richard

March 29	Hull Olympiques	3 – 2	Montreal Rocket	Centre Robert Guertin

April 1	Montreal Rocket	2 – 4	Hull Olympiques	Aréna Maurice-Richard

April 2	Hull Olympiques	2 – 1	2OT	Montreal Rocket	Centre Robert Guertin

Hull wins series 4 – 3

== All-star teams ==
First team

- Goaltender - Dany Dallaire, Halifax Mooseheads
- Left defence - Danny Groulx, Victoriaville Tigres
- Right defence - David Cloutier, Val-d'Or Foreurs / Cape Breton Screaming Eagles
- Left winger - Charles Linglet, Baie-Comeau Drakkar
- Centreman - Pierre-Marc Bouchard, Chicoutimi Saguenéens
- Right winger - Jason Pominville, Shawinigan Cataractes
- Coach - Real Paiement, Acadie-Bathurst Titan

Second team

- Goaltender - Adam Russo, Acadie-Bathurst Titan
- Left defence - Mathieu Dumas, Cape Breton Screaming Eagles
- Right defence - Jean-François David, Shawinigan Cataractes
- Left winger - Philippe Lacasse, Hull Olympiques
- Centreman - Yanick Lehoux, Baie-Comeau Drakkar
- Right winger - Ales Hemsky, Hull Olympiques
- Coach - Pascal Vincent, Cape Breton Screaming Eagles

Rookie team

- Goaltender - Jeff Drouin-Deslauriers, Chicoutimi Saguenéens
- Left defence - Martin Vagner, Hull Olympiques
- Right defence - Jesse Lane, Hull Olympiques
- Left winger - Jean-François Jacques, Baie-Comeau Drakkar
- Centreman - Benoît Mondou, Baie-Comeau Drakkar
- Right winger - Steve Bernier, Moncton Wildcats
- Coach - Benoit Groulx, Hull Olympiques
- List of First/Second/Rookie team all-stars.

== Trophies and awards ==
Team

- President's Cup - Playoff Champions, Victoriaville Tigres
- Jean Rougeau Trophy - Regular Season Champions, Acadie-Bathurst Titan
- Luc Robitaille Trophy - Team that scored the most goals, Baie-Comeau Drakkar & Shawinigan Cataractes
- Robert Lebel Trophy - Team with best GAA, Halifax Mooseheads

Player

- Michel Brière Memorial Trophy - Most Valuable Player, Pierre-Marc Bouchard, Chicoutimi Saguenéens
- Jean Béliveau Trophy - Top Scorer, Pierre-Marc Bouchard, Chicoutimi Saguenéens
- Guy Lafleur Trophy - Playoff MVP, Danny Groulx, Victoriaville Tigres
- Telus Cup – Offensive - Offensive Player of the Year, Pierre-Marc Bouchard, Chicoutimi Saguenéens
- Telus Cup – Defensive - Defensive Player of the Year, Eric Lafrance, Hull Olympiques & Jean-Francois David, Drummondville Voltigeurs
- AutoPro Plaque - Best plus/minus total, Jonathan Bellemare, Shawinigan Cataractes
- Philips Plaque - Best faceoff percentage, Pierre-Luc Emond, Cape Breton Screaming Eagles
- Jacques Plante Memorial Trophy - Best GAA, Olivier Michaud, Shawinigan Cataractes
- Emile Bouchard Trophy - Defenceman of the Year, Danny Groulx, Victoriaville Tigres
- Mike Bossy Trophy - Best Pro Prospect, Pierre-Marc Bouchard, Chicoutimi Saguenéens
- RDS Cup - Rookie of the Year, Benoit Mondou, Baie-Comeau Drakkar
- Michel Bergeron Trophy - Offensive Rookie of the Year, Benoit Mondou, Baie-Comeau Drakkar
- Raymond Lagacé Trophy - Defensive Rookie of the Year, Jeff Drouin-Deslauriers, Chicoutimi Saguenéens
- Frank J. Selke Memorial Trophy - Most sportsmanlike player, Jason Pominville, Shawinigan Cataractes
- QMJHL Humanitarian of the Year - Humanitarian of the Year, Jonathan Bellemare, Shawinigan Cataractes
- Marcel Robert Trophy - Best Scholastic Player, Olivier Michaud, Shawinigan Cataractes
- Paul Dumont Trophy - Personality of the Year, Olivier Michaud, Shawinigan Cataractes

Executive

- Ron Lapointe Trophy - Coach of the Year, Real Paiement, Acadie-Bathurst Titan
- John Horman Trophy - Executive of the Year, Chicoutimi Saguenéens organization
- St-Clair Group Plaque - Marketing Director of the Year, Sylvie Fortier, Baie-Comeau Drakkar

== See also ==
- 2002 Memorial Cup
- 2002 NHL entry draft
- 2001–02 OHL season
- 2001–02 WHL season

Preceded by 2000–01 QMJHL season	QMJHL seasons	Succeeded by 2002–03 QMJHL season
