= Benoît Mondou =

Canadian ice hockey player (born 1985)

- Born: May 3, 1985 (age 41) Sorel-Tracy, Quebec, Canada
- Height: 5 ft 9 in (175 cm)
- Weight: 175 lb (79 kg; 12 st 7 lb)
- Position: Right wing
- Shot: Right
- Played for: Lowell Devils; Trenton Devils; EC VSV
- NHL draft: 247th overall, 2003; Boston Bruins
- Playing career: 2006–2010

Benoît Mondou (born May 3, 1985) is a Canadian former professional ice hockey player who last played for HC La Chaux-de-Fonds of the Swiss-B league. He was selected by the Boston Bruins in the 8th round (247th overall) of the 2003 NHL entry draft.

== Playing career ==
=== Junior ===
Mondou as born in Sorel-Tracy, Quebec. He played Major junior hockey in the QMJHL with the Baie-Comeau Drakkar and Shawinigan Cataractes. During the 2001–02 QMJHL season, Mondou was an offensive force with the Drakkar, scoring 70 points to set the team's single season for most points by a rookie. That same season he won the Michel Bergeron Trophy as the QMJHL's Offensive Rookie of the Year, the RDS Cup as the QMJHL's overall Rookie of the Year, and was named to the QMJHL's All-Rookie team.

He joined the Cataractes midway during the 2002–03 season. Between the two teams he was able to post respectable numbers during his second year, scoring 11 goals and 62 points in 60 games. On June 21, 2003, Mondou was selected in the 2003 NHL entry draft as a late round pick (247th overall) of the Boston Bruins.

Mondou's showed his offensive abilities again during the 2003–04 QMJHL season when he led the Cataractes in scoring with 95 points (5th best in the QMJHL). That year he was awarded the Frank J. Selke Memorial Trophy (most sportsmanlike player in the QMJHL) and also won the CHL Sportsman of the Year award.

=== Professional ===
The Boston Bruins failed to sign Mondou to a contract, and on July 24, 2006 the New Jersey Devils signed the free agent to a minor league contract and assigned him to play the 2006–07season with the Trenton Devils in the ECHL.

Mondou broke into the AHL the following year, playing 51 games for the Lowell Devils during the 2007–08 AHL season.

The 2006–07 season began with promise, but after just 12 games in the AHL Mondou was again assigned to play in the ECHL. On December 30, 2008, after just five games with Trenton, Mondou signed with EC VSV to finish the 2008–09 season in the Austrian hockey league.

Mondou moved to La Chaux-de-Fonds, Switzerland for the 2009–10 season to play for HC La Chaux-de-Fonds in the Swiss-B league.

== Career statistics ==
			Regular season					Playoffs
Season	Team	League	GP	G	A	Pts	PIM	GP	G	A	Pts	PIM
2001–02	Baie-Comeau Drakkar	QMJHL	64	25	45	70	36	5	1	5	6	4
2002–03	Baie-Comeau Drakkar	QMJHL	25	5	16	21	12	—	—	—	—	—
2002–03	Shawinigan Cataractes	QMJHL	35	6	35	41	21	9	3	8	11	8
2003–04	Shawinigan Cataractes	QMJHL	68	34	61	95	32	10	4	9	13	2
2004–05	Shawinigan Cataractes	QMJHL	57	16	43	59	44	4	2	3	5	9
2005–06	Shawinigan Cataractes	QMJHL	59	46	52	98	57	8	5	4	9	6
2006–07	Trenton Titans	ECHL	62	25	31	56	36	5	2	1	3	6
2007–08	Lowell Devils	AHL	51	11	18	29	14	—	—	—	—	—
2007–08	Trenton Titans	ECHL	3	4	1	5	2	—	—	—	—	—
2008–09	Lowell Devils	AHL	12	1	0	1	6	—	—	—	—	—
2008–09	Trenton Titans	ECHL	5	0	0	0	2	—	—	—	—	—
2008–09	EC VSV	Aust	15	8	7	15	10	—	—	—	—	—
2009–10	HC La Chaux-de-Fonds	Swiss-B	46	32	42	74	14	—	—	—	—	—
2010-11	HC La Chaux-de-Fonds	Swiss-B	42	33	34	67	36	—	—	—	—	—
2011-12	HC La Chaux-de-Fonds	Swiss-B	30	10	26	36	18	—	—	—	—	—
2011-12	HC Fribourg-Gottéron	Swiss-A	—	—	—	—	—	1	1	0	0	0
2012-13	HC La Chaux-de-Fonds	Swiss-B	44	32	28	60	10	—	—	—	—	—
2013-14	HC La Chaux-de-Fonds	Swiss-B	28	17	19	36	18	—	—	—	—	—
2014-15	HC La Chaux-de-Fonds	Swiss-B	11	4	5	9	2	—	—	—	—	—
2015-16	HC La Chaux-de-Fonds	Swiss-B	5	2	2	4	2	—	—	—	—	—
AHL totals			63	12	18	30	20	—	—	—	—	—
ECHL totals			70	29	32	61	40	5	2	1	3	6

== Awards ==
QMJHL

Award	Year(s)
RDS Cup	2001–02
QMJHL All-Rookie Team	2001–02
Michel Bergeron Trophy	2001–02
Frank J. Selke Memorial Trophy	2003–04

CHL

Award	Year(s)
CHL Sportsman of the Year	2003-04
