= P. A. Parenteau =

Canadian ice hockey player (born 1983)

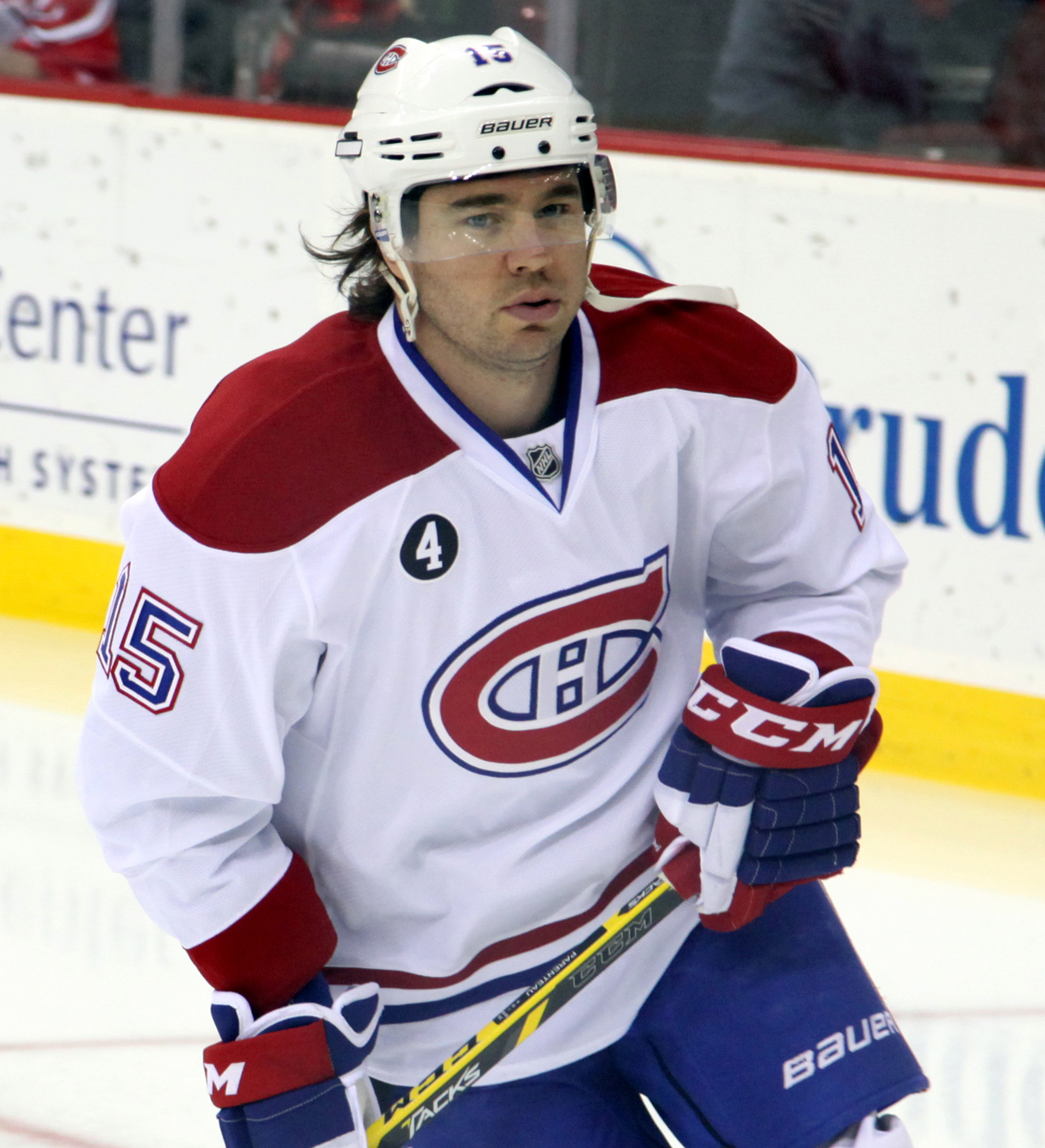
- Parenteau with the Montreal Canadiens in 2015
- Born: March 24, 1983 (age 43) Hull, Quebec, Canada
- Height: 6 ft 0 in (183 cm)
- Weight: 197 lb (89 kg; 14 st 1 lb)
- Position: Right wing
- Shot: Right
- Played for: Chicago Blackhawks; New York Rangers; New York Islanders; Colorado Avalanche; Montreal Canadiens; Toronto Maple Leafs; New Jersey Devils; Nashville Predators; Avtomobilist Yekaterinburg
- NHL draft: 264th overall, 2001; Mighty Ducks of Anaheim
- Playing career: 2003–2018

Pierre-Alexandre Parenteau (born March 24, 1983) is a Canadian former professional ice hockey right winger.

In the National Hockey League (NHL) he played for the Chicago Blackhawks, New York Rangers, New York Islanders, Colorado Avalanche, Montreal Canadiens, Toronto Maple Leafs, New Jersey Devils and Nashville Predators, and then finished his career with Avtomobilist Yekaterinburg of the Kontinental Hockey League (KHL). He was originally drafted by the Mighty Ducks of Anaheim in the ninth round, 264th overall, in the 2001 NHL entry draft, though he never made an appearance for the team.

== Playing career ==
=== Mighty Ducks of Anaheim ===
Parenteau was drafted by the Mighty Ducks of Anaheim in the ninth round, 264th overall, of the 2001 NHL entry draft. During his tenure with the organization, Parenteau never appeared in a game for the club.

=== Chicago Blackhawks ===
On December 28, 2006, Parenteau was traded from the Ducks, along with Bruno St. Jacques, to the Chicago Blackhawks in exchange for Sébastien Caron, Matt Keith and Chris Durno. He spent majority of the season in the American Hockey League (AHL) with the Norfolk Admirals, recording 51 points in 40 games. Parenteau also made his NHL debut during the 2006–07 season with the Blackhawks, playing in five games by season's end.

=== New York Rangers ===
On October 11, 2007, Parenteau was traded to the New York Rangers in exchange for a conditional seventh-round pick in 2008.

In 2009–10, after starting the season with the Rangers' American League affiliate, the Hartford Wolf Pack, Parenteau was recalled to New York and scored his first NHL goal in his first game with the Rangers against Dwayne Roloson of the New York Islanders on October 28, 2009.

=== New York Islanders ===
With two more extended stints with the Rangers throughout the season, Parenteau posted eight points in 22 games, producing enough league-wide interest to earn him a free agent contract from the New York Islanders for one-year on July 2, 2010.

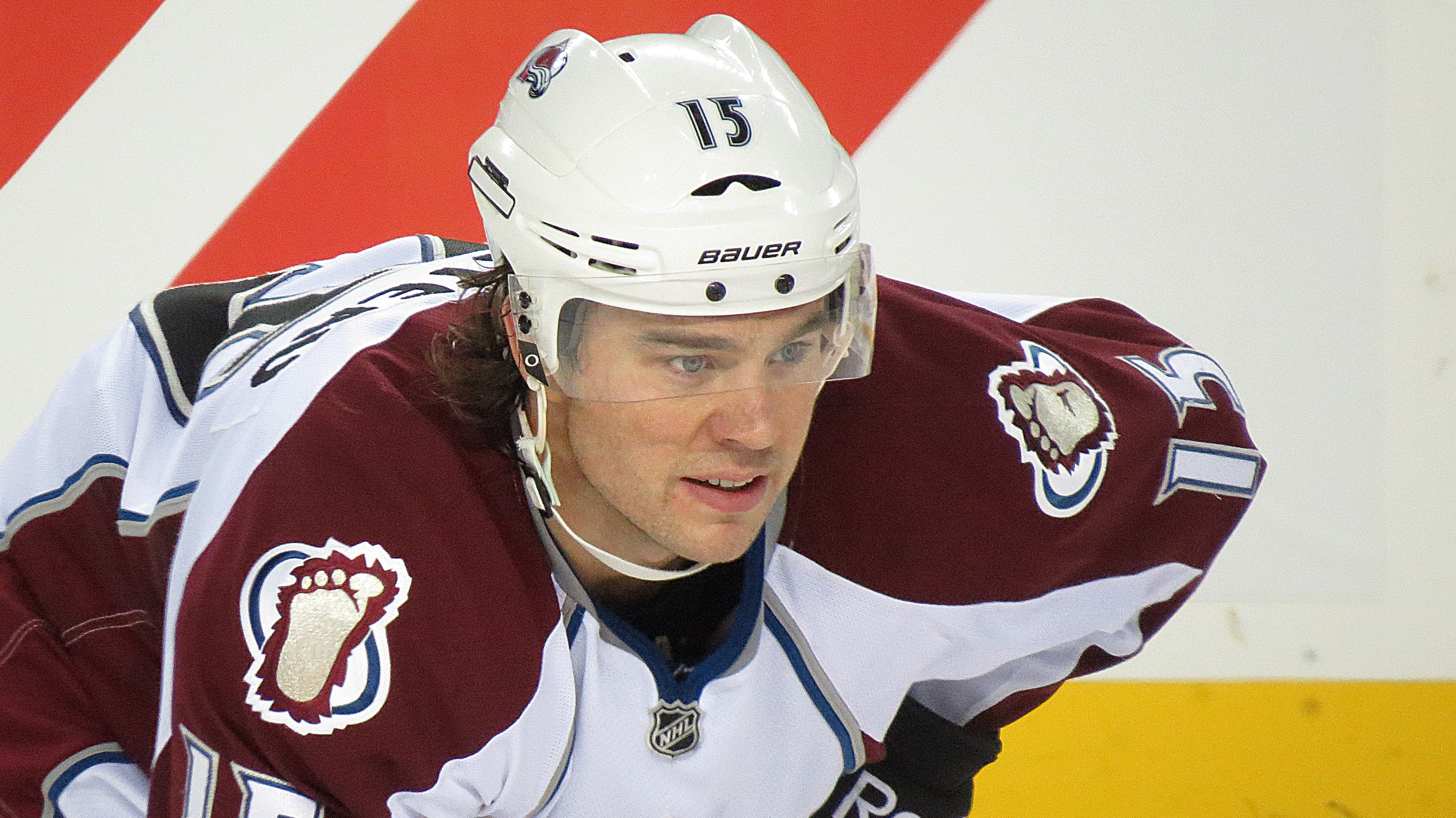
Parenteau with the Colorado Avalanche in December 2013

Parenteau made the Islanders' opening night roster out of training camp and found a permanent spot on the top line alongside John Tavares and Matt Moulson. After establishing himself with the Islanders, Parenteau was quickly signed to a one-year extension on February 17, 2011. At the end of his first full season in the NHL, he scored 20 goals and 53 points, finishing the season second in scoring for the Islanders.

With the ambition to build upon his break-out season, Parenteau followed up his success in the 2011–12 season, producing 49 assists and 67 points to finish third amongst the Islanders in scoring.

=== Colorado Avalanche ===
On July 1, 2012, Parenteau signed, as an unrestricted free agent, to a four-year contract with the Colorado Avalanche. With the lock-out-shortened 2012–13 season delaying his Colorado debut, Parenteau later scored his first goal for the Avalanche in a 3–1 home opening victory over the Los Angeles Kings on January 22, 2013. He scored in the Avalanche's first four home games, becoming the first Avalanche to do so since Peter Forsberg and Chris Drury in 2000–01. On February 14, 2013, in a 4–3 shootout victory over the Minnesota Wild, Parenteau appeared in his 200th career NHL game. In participating in every game for the Avalanche that season, he recorded a career-best points-per-game average to lead the team with 18 goals and co-lead, alongside linemate Matt Duchene, with 43 points.

=== Montreal Canadiens ===
On June 30, 2014, Parenteau was traded, along with a fifth-round draft pick in 2015, to the Montreal Canadiens in exchange for Daniel Brière. In the 2014–15 season with the Canadiens, Parenteau was hampered by injury and occasions of healthy scratches, to finish with an output on 22 points in 56 games. On June 28, 2015, Parenteau was placed on unconditional waivers by the Canadiens for the purpose of buying the final year of his contract out. Having cleared waivers, the next day he was formally bought out and released to free agency.

=== Toronto Maple Leafs ===
Following his buyout, Parenteau signed a one-year contract with the Toronto Maple Leafs on July 1, 2015. Parenteau cited head coach Mike Babcock as the main reason for the signing. The two had previously worked together within the Mighty Ducks organization more than a decade earlier. Parenteau's year in Toronto was arguably his best season since 2012–13 season as he finished second in team scoring and first for goals scored on a rebuilding Maple Leafs team that finished last place in the NHL. Parenteau's play lead him to be included among lists of most likely players to be traded come the February 29, 2016, trade deadline, however, the Maple Leafs were unable to move Parenteau, likely due to an injury suffered a few days prior. As the season came to an end, Parenteau spoke highly of his time in Toronto, saying it was "the best I've felt in the last three years." He added his wish to re-sign with the team in the offseason.

=== Return to the Islanders, New Jersey Devils and Nashville Predators ===
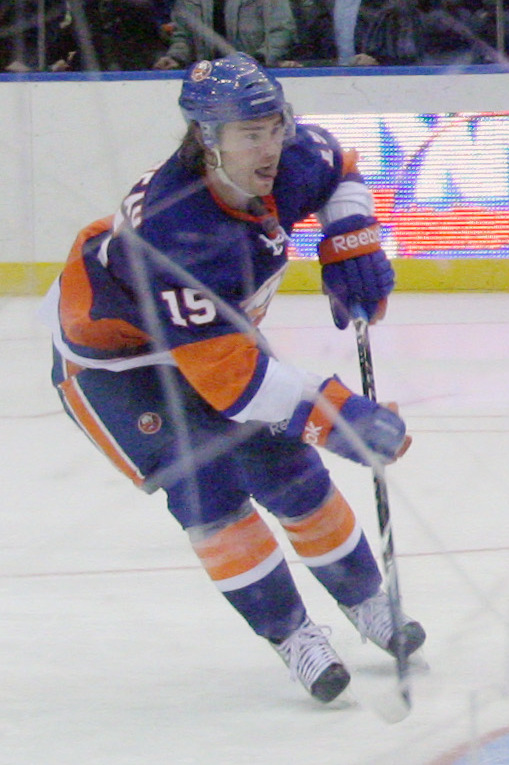
Parenteau during his tenure with the New York Islanders

On July 3, 2016, Parenteau signed a one-year deal with the New York Islanders, a team he had previously played for between 2010 and 2012, but was waived on October 10, 2016. He was claimed off waivers by the New Jersey Devils on October 11, 2016. Upon joining the Devils, Parenteau joined the likes of Sergei Nemchinov, Arron Asham, and Kevin Weekes as being one of a few players to complete the Hudson River Triple (being a member of the Rangers, Islanders and Devils). In the 2016–17 season, Parenteau continued his scoring rate in producing 13 goals and 27 points in 59 games.

With the Devils falling in the standings, he was traded at the NHL deadline to join his 8th NHL club, the Nashville Predators in exchange for a sixth-round draft pick on March 1, 2017. Parenteau appeared in 8 regular season games with the club, scoring one assist. He also skated in five playoff games. The Predators made it to the 2017 Stanley Cup Finals, but ultimately fell to the Penguins in 6 Games.

=== Avtomobilist Yekaterinburg and retirement ===
Parenteau as a free agent from the Predators, was unsigned over the summer before agreeing to a professional tryout contract with the Detroit Red Wings on September 6, 2017. Following the training camp and preseason, Parenteau was released by the Red Wings without a contract offer. On November 1, 2017, he signed for the remainder of the 2017–18 season with Russian outfit Avtomobilist Yekaterinburg of the Kontinental Hockey League (KHL). On June 14, 2018, Parenteau announced his retirement.

== Personal life ==
Parenteau is the cousin of former NHL player, Pierre-Marc Bouchard.

Parenteau was arrested on March 3, 2020, in Riverview, New Brunswick on charges of drunk driving.

== Career statistics ==
=== Regular season and playoffs ===
			Regular season					Playoffs
Season	Team	League	GP	G	A	Pts	PIM	GP	G	A	Pts	PIM
1999–2000	Collège Charles-Lemoyne	QMAAA	40	25	40	65	18	—	—	—	—	—
2000–01	Moncton Wildcats	QMJHL	45	10	19	29	38	—	—	—	—	—
2000–01	Chicoutimi Saguenéens	QMJHL	28	10	13	23	14	7	4	7	11	2
2001–02	Chicoutimi Saguenéens	QMJHL	68	51	67	118	120	4	3	1	4	10
2002–03	Chicoutimi Saguenéens	QMJHL	31	20	35	55	56	—	—	—	—	—
2002–03	Sherbrooke Castors	QMJHL	28	13	35	48	84	12	8	11	19	6
2003–04	Cincinnati Mighty Ducks	AHL	66	14	16	30	20	7	1	2	3	6
2004–05	Cincinnati Mighty Ducks	AHL	76	17	24	41	58	9	2	0	2	8
2005–06	Augusta Lynx	ECHL	2	0	1	1	0	—	—	—	—	—
2005–06	Portland Pirates	AHL	56	22	27	49	42	19	5	17	22	24
2006–07	Portland Pirates	AHL	28	15	13	28	35	—	—	—	—	—
2006–07	Norfolk Admirals	AHL	40	15	36	51	12	6	2	1	3	2
2006–07	Chicago Blackhawks	NHL	5	0	1	1	2	—	—	—	—	—
2007–08	Hartford Wolf Pack	AHL	75	34	47	81	81	5	3	2	5	13
2008–09	Hartford Wolf Pack	AHL	74	29	49	78	142	—	—	—	—	—
2009–10	Hartford Wolf Pack	AHL	35	20	25	45	63	—	—	—	—	—
2009–10	New York Rangers	NHL	22	3	5	8	4	—	—	—	—	—
2010–11	New York Islanders	NHL	81	20	33	53	46	—	—	—	—	—
2011–12	New York Islanders	NHL	80	18	49	67	89	—	—	—	—	—
2012–13	Colorado Avalanche	NHL	48	18	25	43	38	—	—	—	—	—
2013–14	Colorado Avalanche	NHL	55	14	19	33	30	7	1	2	3	2
2014–15	Montreal Canadiens	NHL	56	8	14	22	30	8	1	1	2	2
2015–16	Toronto Maple Leafs	NHL	77	20	21	41	68	—	—	—	—	—
2016–17	New Jersey Devils	NHL	59	13	14	27	35	—	—	—	—	—
2016–17	Nashville Predators	NHL	8	0	1	1	0	5	0	0	0	0
2017–18	Avtomobilist Yekaterinburg	KHL	20	3	10	13	4	5	0	1	1	2
AHL totals			450	166	237	403	453	46	13	22	35	53
NHL totals			491	114	182	296	342	20	2	3	5	4

=== International ===
Medal record

Representing Canada

Ice hockey

World Junior Championships
Silver medal – second place	2003 Halifax	

Year	Team	Event	Result	GP	G	A	Pts	PIM
2003	Canada	WJC	2nd place, silver medalist(s)	6	4	3	7	2
Junior totals				6	4	3	7	2

== Awards and honours ==
Award	Year
AHL
Second All-Star Team	2007–08
First All-Star Team	2008–09
