= Shell Cup =

The Shell Cup could be:

- Shell Cup, renamed the Caribbean Cup
- Shell Cup, New Zealand limited overs cricket competition now known as the Ford Trophy
- Shell Cup – Defensive, renamed the Telus Cup – Defensive, an ice-hockey trophy in Quebec
- Shell Cup – Offensive, renamed the Telus Cup – Offensive, an ice-hockey trophy in Quebec
