= QMJHL Humanitarian of the Year =

The QMJHL Humanitarian of the Year Award is awarded annually by the Quebec Maritimes Junior Hockey League (QMJHL) to one player for their humanitarianism and community involvement. The player also receives a plaque which is known as the Wittnauer Plaque, formerly known as the Karcher Plaque from 1992 to 1997.

== Winners ==
Season	Player	Team
Karcher Plaque
1992–93	Jean Nadeau	Shawinigan Cataractes
1993–94	Stéphane Roy	Val-d'Or Foreurs
1994–95	David Beauregard	Saint-Hyacinthe Laser
1995–96	Daniel Brière	Drummondville Voltigeurs
1996–97	Jason Groleau	Victoriaville Tigres
Wittnauer Plaque
1997–98	David Thibeault	Victoriaville Tigres
1998–99	Philippe Sauvé	Rimouski Océanic
1999–2000	Simon Gamache	Val-d'Or Foreurs
2000–01	Ali MacEachern	Halifax Mooseheads
2001–02	Jonathan Bellemare	Shawinigan Cataractes
2002–03	David Masse	Québec Remparts
2002–03	A. J. MacLean	Halifax Mooseheads
2003–04	Josh Hennessy	Quebec Remparts
2004–05	Guillaume Desbiens	Rouyn-Noranda Huskies
2005–06	Joey Ryan	Quebec Remparts
2006–07	Roger Kennedy	Halifax Mooseheads
2007-08	Chris Morehouse	Moncton Wildcats
2008–09	Matthew Pistilli	Shawinigan Cataractes
2009–10	Nick MacNeil	Cape Breton Screaming Eagles
2010–11	Gabriel Lemieux	Shawinigan Cataractes
2011–12	Vincent Barnard	Quebec Remparts
2012–13	Konrad Abeltshauser	Halifax Mooseheads
2013–14	Charles-David Beaudoin	Drummondville Voltigeurs
2014–15	Danick Martel	Blainville-Boisbriand Armada
2015–16	Samuel Laberge	Rimouski Océanic
2016–17	Samuel Laberge	Rimouski Océanic
2017–18	Vincent Tremblay-Lapalme	Chicoutimi Saguenéens
2018–19	Charle-Edouard D'Astous	Rimouski Océanic
2019–20	Xavier Simoneau	Drummondville Voltigeurs
2020–21	Anthony D'Amours	Rimouski Océanic
2021–22	Brett Budgell	Charlottetown Islanders
2022–23	Cam Squires	Cape Breton Eagles
2023–24	Marcus Kearsey	Charlottetown Islanders
2024–25	Maxwell Jardine	Charlottetown Islanders
2025–26	Marcus Kearsey	Charlottetown Islanders
