= Josh Hennessy =

American ice hockey player (born 1985)

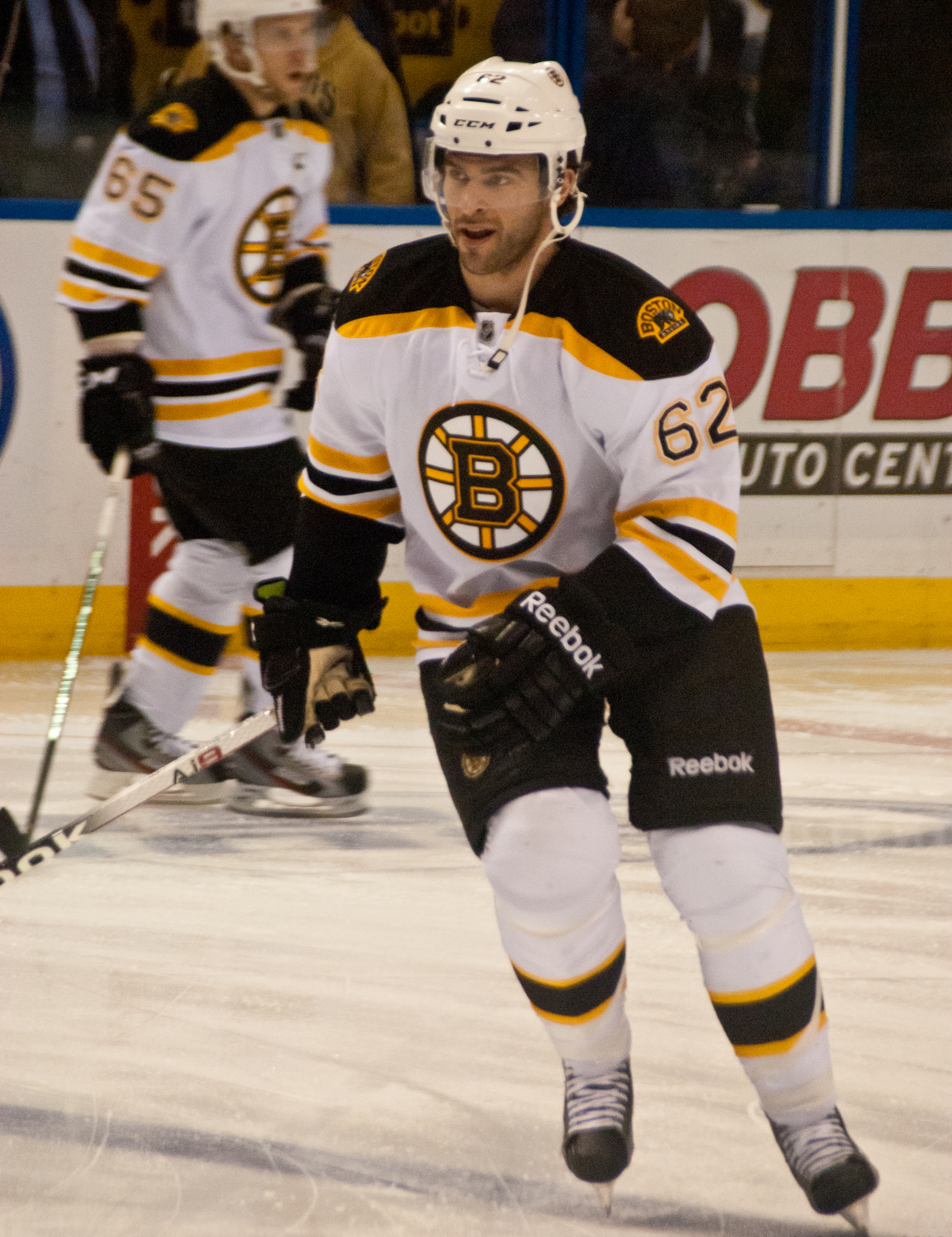
- Hennessy with the Boston Bruins in 2012
- Born: February 7, 1985 (age 41) Brockton, Massachusetts, U.S.
- Height: 6 ft 0 in (183 cm)
- Weight: 190 lb (86 kg; 13 st 8 lb)
- Position: Center
- Shot: Left
- Played for: Ottawa Senators; HC Lugano; Boston Bruins; HC Vityaz; Kloten Flyers; Neftekhimik Nizhnekamsk; Växjö Lakers
- NHL draft: 43rd overall, 2003; San Jose Sharks
- Playing career: 2005–2018

Joshua Hennessy (born February 7, 1985) is an American former professional ice hockey player. He most recently played for the Providence Bruins of the American Hockey League (AHL). Hennessy previously played in the National Hockey League (NHL) for the Ottawa Senators and Boston Bruins.

== Early career ==
As a youth, Hennessy played in the 1999 Quebec International Pee-Wee Hockey Tournament with the Boston Junior Eagles minor ice hockey team.

Hennessy was drafted 17th overall in 2001, by the Quebec Remparts in the Quebec Major Junior Hockey League draft. He finished the 2001–02 QMJHL season with 40 points, good for the sixth in scoring on his team. He did not speak French when he arrived, but later became fluent and served as the team's captain. Hennessy played in the 2003 Memorial Cup, but Quebec was eliminated at the round-robin tournament, losing all three games. He was then drafted by the San Jose Sharks 43rd overall at the 2003 NHL entry draft. He was awarded the Karcher Plaque as the QMJHL Humanitarian of the Year in 2004. In the 2004–05 QMJHL season, Hennessy led the team in scoring.

== Professional career ==
Hennessy began his professional career with the San Jose Sharks' American Hockey League (AHL) affiliate, the Cleveland Barons, during the 2005–06. He led the Barons in goals (24) and assists (39) for 63 points in 80 games. He was one of only two players on the team to play in every regular-season game. Hennessy holds the franchise records for both goals and points in a season by a rookie and was named the Barons Rookie of the Year for the 2005–06 season.

Hennessy was traded with Tom Preissing to the Ottawa Senators via the Chicago Blackhawks on July 9, 2006, in a three-way deal; Ottawa traded Bryan Smolinski and Martin Havlát to Chicago, who sent Mark Bell to San Jose while sending Michal Barinka and a second-round draft pick in 2008 to Ottawa.

Hennessy then spent the majority of 2006–07 season with the Senators' AHL affiliate, the Binghamton Senators. During his second call up to Ottawa, Hennessy scored his first NHL goal on January 7, 2007, against the Philadelphia Flyers.

On May 6, 2010, Hennessy left the Senators organization after four years, signing a one-year deal with Swiss club HC Lugano.

On July 5, 2011, Hennessy signed a one-year, two-way contract with the Boston Bruins. He was assigned to their AHL affiliate, the Providence Bruins, for the majority of the 2011–12 season. In 67 games, he contributed offensively with 41 points before he was recalled to appear in three scoreless games with the Bruins.

During the 2014–15 season, Hennessy featured in 27 games with Neftekhimik Nizhnekamsk before opting for a mid-season transfer to Swedish club Växjö Lakers on December 30, 2014. After adding 13 points in just 20 games to close out the season with the Lakers, and claiming the Swedish championship, Hennessy signed a two-year contract extension on June 4, 2015.

== Career statistics ==
| | | | Regular season | | | | | Playoffs |
| Season | Team | League | GP | G | A | Pts | PIM | GP | G | A | Pts | PIM |
|---|---|---|---|---|---|---|---|---|---|---|---|---|
| 2000–01 | Milton Academy | HS Prep | 28 | 20 | 30 | 50 | 20 | — | — | — | — | — |
| 2001–02 | Quebec Remparts | QMJHL | 70 | 20 | 20 | 40 | 24 | 9 | 3 | 9 | 12 | 8 |
| 2002–03 | Quebec Remparts | QMJHL | 72 | 33 | 51 | 84 | 44 | 11 | 6 | 9 | 15 | 10 |
| 2003–04 | Quebec Remparts | QMJHL | 59 | 40 | 42 | 82 | 55 | — | — | — | — | — |
| 2004–05 | Quebec Remparts | QMJHL | 68 | 35 | 50 | 85 | 39 | 13 | 2 | 9 | 11 | 6 |
| 2005–06 | Cleveland Barons | AHL | 80 | 24 | 39 | 63 | 60 | — | — | — | — | — |
| 2006–07 | Ottawa Senators | NHL | 10 | 1 | 0 | 1 | 4 | — | — | — | — | — |
| 2006–07 | Binghamton Senators | AHL | 76 | 27 | 30 | 57 | 54 | — | — | — | — | — |
| 2007–08 | Ottawa Senators | NHL | 5 | 0 | 0 | 0 | 0 | — | — | — | — | — |
| 2007–08 | Binghamton Senators | AHL | 76 | 22 | 29 | 51 | 49 | — | — | — | — | — |
| 2008–09 | Ottawa Senators | NHL | 1 | 0 | 0 | 0 | 0 | — | — | — | — | — |
| 2008–09 | Binghamton Senators | AHL | 59 | 20 | 17 | 37 | 26 | — | — | — | — | — |
| 2009–10 | Ottawa Senators | NHL | 4 | 0 | 0 | 0 | 0 | — | — | — | — | — |
| 2009–10 | Binghamton Senators | AHL | 78 | 30 | 38 | 68 | 26 | — | — | — | — | — |
| 2010–11 | HC Lugano | NLA | 36 | 9 | 10 | 19 | 22 | — | — | — | — | — |
| 2011–12 | Boston Bruins | NHL | 3 | 0 | 0 | 0 | 2 | — | — | — | — | — |
| 2011–12 | Providence Bruins | AHL | 69 | 19 | 22 | 41 | 22 | — | — | — | — | — |
| 2012–13 | HC Vityaz | KHL | 48 | 11 | 14 | 25 | 53 | — | — | — | — | — |
| 2013–14 | HC Vityaz | KHL | 19 | 1 | 7 | 8 | 10 | — | — | — | — | — |
| 2013–14 | Kloten Flyers | NLA | 1 | 0 | 0 | 0 | 0 | 6 | 1 | 3 | 4 | 0 |
| 2014–15 | Neftekhimik Nizhnekamsk | KHL | 27 | 2 | 6 | 8 | 20 | — | — | — | — | — |
| 2014–15 | Växjö Lakers | SHL | 20 | 5 | 8 | 13 | 12 | 18 | 2 | 6 | 8 | 8 |
| 2015–16 | Växjö Lakers | SHL | 52 | 8 | 8 | 16 | 40 | 9 | 0 | 1 | 1 | 33 |
| 2016–17 | Växjö Lakers | SHL | 51 | 3 | 9 | 12 | 16 | 6 | 1 | 0 | 1 | 6 |
| 2017–18 | Providence Bruins | AHL | 52 | 10 | 7 | 17 | 18 | — | — | — | — | — |
| AHL totals | | | 490 | 152 | 182 | 334 | 255 | — | — | — | — | — |
| NHL totals | | | 23 | 1 | 0 | 1 | 6 | — | — | — | — | — |
| SHL totals | | | 123 | 16 | 25 | 41 | 68 | 33 | 3 | 7 | 10 | 47 |
