= Telus Cup – Offensive =

- Description: Annual ice hockey award presented to the best offensive player in the Quebec Major Junior Hockey League
- Country: Canada
- Presented by: Quebec Major Junior Hockey League

The Telus Cup – Offensive is awarded annually to the person voted the best offensive player in the Quebec Major Junior Hockey League. It was known as the Shell Cup from 1989–90 to 1993–94, and as the Ford Cup from 1994–95 to 1996–97.

== Winners ==
Season	Player	Team
Shell Cup – Offensive
1989–90	Patrick Lebeau	Victoriaville Tigres
1990–91	Yanic Perreault	Trois-Rivières Draveurs
1991–92	Martin Gendron	Saint-Hyacinthe Laser
1992–93	Rene Corbet	Drummondville Voltigeurs
1993–94	Yanick Dube	Laval Titan
Ford Cup – Offensive
1994–95	Sebastien Bordeleau	Hull Olympiques
1995–96	Danny Briere	Drummondville Voltigeurs
1996–97	Pavel Rosa	Hull Olympiques
Telus Cup – Offensive
1997–98	Pierre Dagenais	Rouyn-Noranda Huskies
1998–99	James Desmarais	Rouyn-Noranda Huskies
1999–2000	Brad Richards	Rimouski Océanic
2000–01	Simon Gamache	Val-d'Or Foreurs
2001–02	Pierre-Marc Bouchard	Chicoutimi Saguenéens
2002–03	Pierre-Luc Sleigher	Victoriaville Tigres
2003–04	Sidney Crosby	Rimouski Océanic
2004–05	Sidney Crosby	Rimouski Océanic
2005–06	Alexander Radulov	Québec Remparts
