= Luc Robitaille Trophy =

The Luc Robitaille Trophy is awarded to the team with the best goals for average during the regular season in the Quebec Maritimes Junior Hockey League. The trophy is named after Luc Robitaille, who played three QMJHL seasons with the Hull Olympiques in the 1980s. Before 2015, the Trophy was awarded to the team that scored the most goals during the regular season.

== Winners ==
=== Most goals scored ===
Season	Team	Goals
2001–02	Baie-Comeau Drakkar; Shawinigan Cataractes	288
2002–03	Baie-Comeau Drakkar	319
2003–04	Gatineau Olympiques	306
2004–05	Rimouski Océanic	333
2005–06	Quebec Remparts	349
2006–07	Cape Breton Screaming Eagles	308
2007–08	Rouyn-Noranda Huskies	294
2008–09	Drummondville Voltigeurs	345
2009–10	Saint John Sea Dogs	309
2010–11	Saint John Sea Dogs	324
2011–12	Victoriaville Tigres	311
2012–13	Halifax Mooseheads	347
2013–14	Val-d'Or Foreurs	306

=== Best goals for average ===
Season	Team	Goals
2014–15	Moncton Wildcats	4.06
2015–16	Rouyn-Noranda Huskies	4.38
2016–17	Charlottetown Islanders	4.37
2017–18	Drummondville Voltigeurs	4.07
2018–19	Drummondville Voltigeurs	4.97
2019–20	Sherbrooke Phoenix	4.57
2020–21	Charlottetown Islanders	4.90
2021–22	Saint John Sea Dogs	4.51
2022–23	Halifax Mooseheads	4.93
2023–24	Drummondville Voltigeurs	4.50
2024–25	Moncton Wildcats	4.59
2025–26	Chicoutimi Saguenéens	4.97
