= Danny Groulx =

Canadian ice hockey player

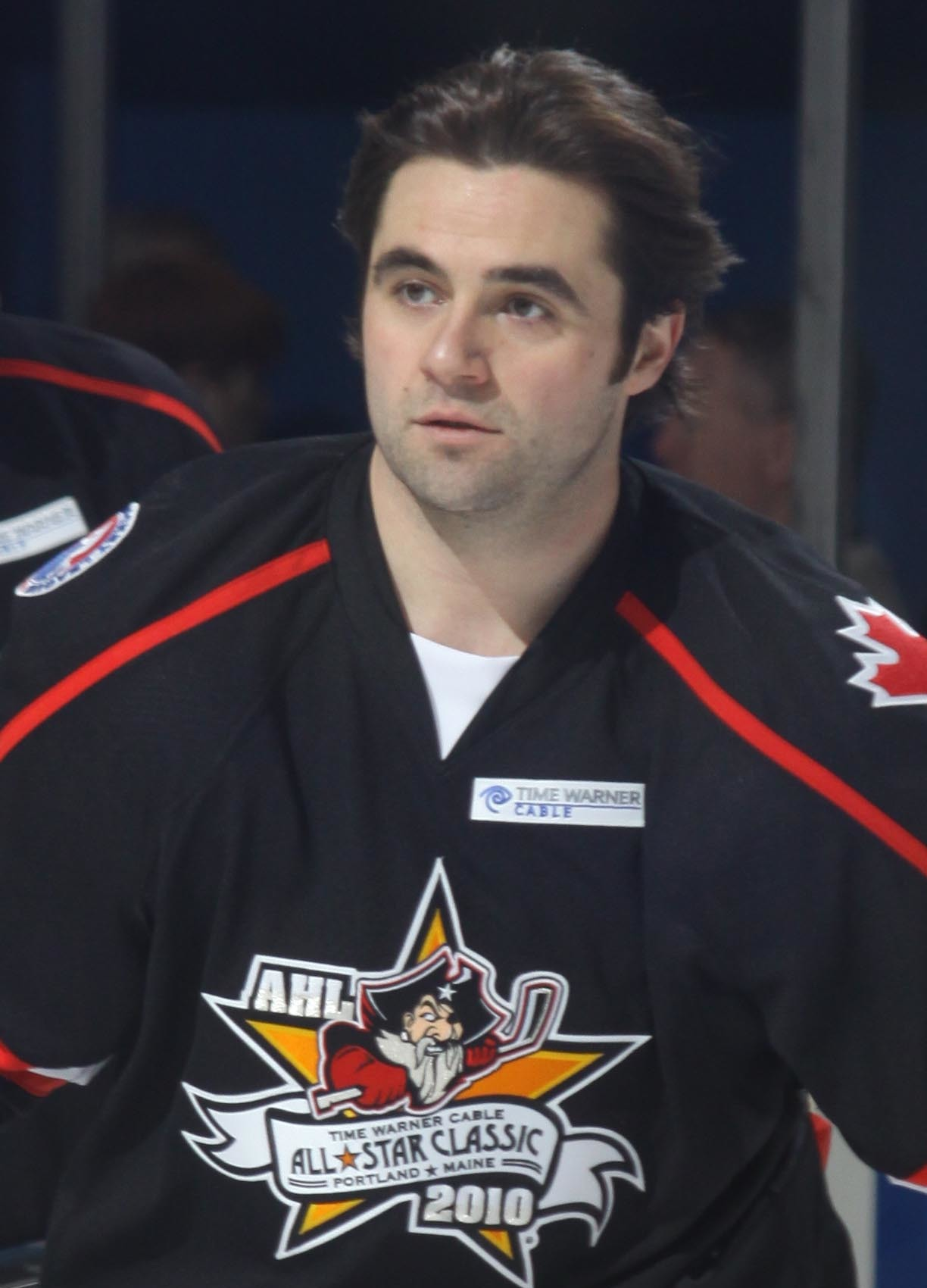
- Born: June 23, 1981 (age 45) LaSalle, Quebec, Canada
- Height: 6 ft 0 in (183 cm)
- Weight: 205 lb (93 kg; 14 st 9 lb)
- Position: Defence
- Shot: Left
- Played for: AHL; Worcester Sharks; Rockford IceHogs; Manitoba Moose; Hamilton Bulldogs; Grand Rapids Griffins; KHL; Dinamo Minsk; Torpedo Nizhny Novgorod; Khanty-Mansiysk Yugra; DEL; Kassel Huskies
- NHL draft: Undrafted
- Playing career: 2002–2016

Danny Groulx (born June 23, 1981) is a Canadian former professional ice hockey defenceman who played in the American Hockey League and Liiga. In 2018, Groulx was inducted into the QMJHL Hall of Fame and named the head coach of Riverains du collège Charles-Lemoyne Midget AAA team.

== Playing career ==
Groulx was drafted 11th overall by the Val-d'Or Foreurs in the 1997 QMJHL Draft. After winning the 1998 President Cup, Groulx joined the Acadie-Bathurst Titan and later the Victoriaville Tigres. At the conclusion of his major junior career, he racked up 332 points in 341 games and won three Memorial Cups. Groulx holds the distinction for most career points for a defenseman in the QMJHL.

On August 12, 2002, Groulx was signed as a free agent for the Detroit Red Wings. Groulx then played with Red Wings affiliate, the Grand Rapids Griffins of the AHL for the next three seasons before he was loaned to the Manitoba Moose for the completion of the 2004–05 season.

Groulx was invited to the Montreal Canadiens training camp on September 13, 2006. He was reassigned to the Hamilton Bulldogs of the AHL for the 2006–07 season, where he helped the Bulldogs capture the Calder Cup.

Groulx signed a one-year AHL contract with the Rockford IceHogs on September 4, 2008, and was later invited to the Chicago Blackhawks training camp on September 16, 2008. However, he was reassigned to the IceHogs for the 2008–09 season, where he posted 40 points in 80 games.

On July 16, 2009, Groulx signed a one-year contract with the San Jose Sharks. While with the Sharks American Hockey League affiliate, he was named to the AHL All-Star Classic and won the Eddie Shore Award as the AHL's best defenseman. He signed a one-year contract with the Sharks on July 2, 2012. On March 22, 2013, Groulx was assigned to the Chicago Wolves by the Sharks while Chicago defenceman Derek Joslin was assigned to the Worcester by the Vancouver Canucks as part of an AHL trade.

Groulx retired from professional hockey after the 2014–15 season which he spent in France with the Dragons de Rouen.

In 2018, Groulx was inducted into QMJHL Hall of Fame. He was later named the new head coach for the Midget AAA Collège Charles-Lemoyne Riverains.

== Career statistics ==
			Regular season					Playoffs
Season	Team	League	GP	G	A	Pts	PIM	GP	G	A	Pts	PIM
1996–97	Collège Charles-Lemoyne	QMAAA	40	2	26	28		15	3	15	18
1997–98	Val-d'Or Foreurs	QMJHL	63	4	16	20	61	19	1	4	5	18
1998–99	Val-d'Or Foreurs	QMJHL	36	3	26	29	55	—	—	—	—	—
1998–99	Acadie-Bathurst Titan	QMJHL	36	2	15	17	51	18	0	2	2	6
1999–2000	Victoriaville Tigres	QMJHL	66	12	55	67	131	6	0	4	4	14
2000–01	Victoriaville Tigres	QMJHL	72	16	71	87	164	13	2	19	21	46
2001–02	Victoriaville Tigres	QMJHL	68	29	83	112	165	22	9	30	39	68
2002–03	Grand Rapids Griffins	AHL	71	3	7	10	52	7	0	1	1	7
2003–04	Grand Rapids Griffins	AHL	79	8	13	21	93	3	0	0	0	0
2004–05	Grand Rapids Griffins	AHL	53	1	11	12	90	—	—	—	—	—
2004–05	Manitoba Moose	AHL	16	2	5	7	16	13	1	3	4	14
2005–06	Kassel Huskies	DEL	51	2	11	13	93	—	—	—	—	—
2006–07	Hamilton Bulldogs	AHL	58	0	16	16	62	22	6	6	12	14
2007–08	Manitoba Moose	AHL	58	4	20	24	32	6	2	1	3	12
2008–09	Rockford IceHogs	AHL	77	6	34	40	58	4	0	2	2	2
2009–10	Worcester Sharks	AHL	80	14	52	66	80	10	1	6	7	6
2010–11	Torpedo Nizhny Novgorod	KHL	38	2	23	25	50	—	—	—	—	—
2011–12	Dinamo Minsk	KHL	4	0	0	0	2	—	—	—	—	—
2011–12	Yugra Khanty-Mansiysk	KHL	20	0	2	2	20	—	—	—	—	—
2012–13	Worcester Sharks	AHL	33	4	12	16	24	—	—	—	—	—
2012–13	Chicago Wolves	AHL	13	2	4	6	4	—	—	—	—	—
2013–14	Assat	Liiga	14	1	1	2	12	—	—	—	—	—
2014–15	Dragons de Rouen	FRA	13	1	9	10	16	4	1	3	4	6
AHL totals			541	44	175	219	481	65	10	19	29	511
