= Pierre-Marc Bouchard =

Canadian ice hockey player (born 1984)

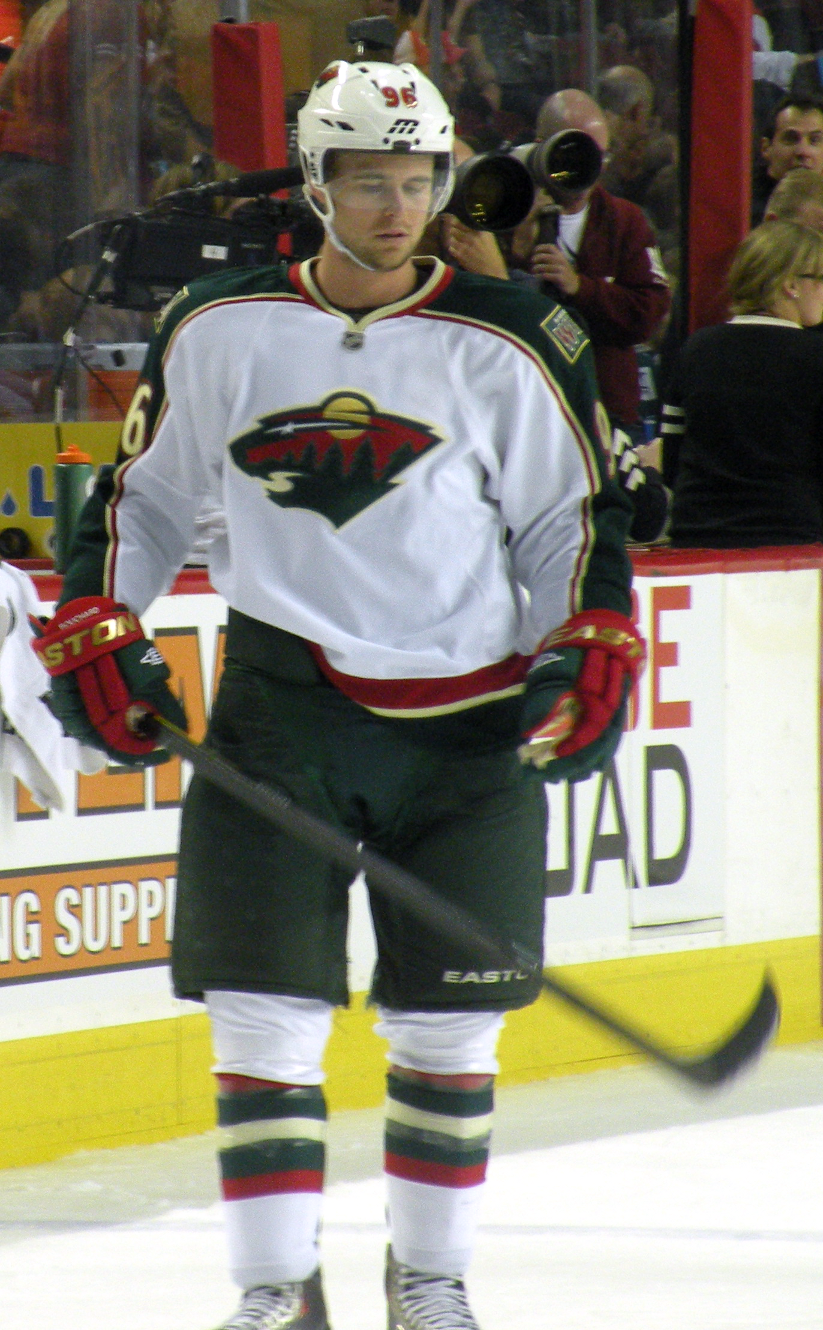
- Bouchard with the Minnesota Wild in 2011
- Born: April 27, 1984 (age 42) Sherbrooke, Quebec, Canada
- Height: 5 ft 10 in (178 cm)
- Weight: 173 lb (78 kg; 12 st 5 lb)
- Position: Centre
- Shot: Left
- Played for: Minnesota Wild; New York Islanders; EV Zug
- NHL draft: 8th overall, 2002; Minnesota Wild
- Playing career: 2002–2016

Pierre-Marc Bouchard (born April 27, 1984) is a Canadian former professional ice hockey player. Bouchard played his junior hockey with the Chicoutimi Saguenéens in the Quebec Major Junior Hockey League (QMJHL), and is the older brother of François Bouchard. Bouchard was selected eighth overall in the 2002 NHL entry draft by the Minnesota Wild and also played with the New York Islanders. He is the cousin of P. A. Parenteau.

== Playing career ==
As a youth, Bouchard played in the 1998 Quebec International Pee-Wee Hockey Tournament with the College-Français Rive-Sud minor ice hockey team from South Shore, Montreal.

Bouchard appeared in professional play for the first time in the 2002–03 NHL season in which he posted 7 goals and 13 assists for a total of 20 points in 50 games for the Minnesota Wild. During the 2004–05 NHL lockout, he played for the Wild's American Hockey League (AHL) affiliate, the Houston Aeros. Within this time period, Bouchard vastly improved his game. This was proved in the 2005–06 NHL season, where he posted 17 goals and 42 assists for 59 points in 80 games.

During his career, Bouchard was regarded as a creative playmaker and strong team player who often attempted unorthodox techniques during play. An example of one of these techniques was performed during an overtime shootout attempt in which he converted by utilizing a variation of a "spin-o-rama" against Chicago Blackhawks goaltender Nikolai Khabibulin. He repeated this move several years later, again against Khabibulin, though he did so during regulation play on a breakaway, rather than during an overtime shootout attempt. Bouchard later credited the move to his younger brother François Bouchard.

On July 25, 2008, Bouchard signed a five-year, $20.4 million contract with the Wild. After suffering a hit to the head late in the 2008–09 season, Bouchard missed the rest of that season and all but the season opener of the 2009–10 season with post-concussion syndrome. Bouchard resumed play on December 1, 2010, against the Phoenix Coyotes after a 13-month absence, having missed 112 games. Bouchard scored a goal in his second game back, a 3–2 shootout loss to the Calgary Flames.

On July 5, 2013, Bouchard signed a one-year, $2 million contract with the New York Islanders. On February 6, 2014, he was traded to the Chicago Blackhawks (along with Peter Regin) in exchange for a fourth-round draft pick in the 2014 NHL entry draft, and was assigned to the Blackhawks' AHL affiliate, the Rockford IceHogs.

On July 8, 2014, Bouchard signed a one-year contract with Swiss club EV Zug of the National League A (NLA). The contract also included an NHL out clause if he could reach a deal with a club prior to July 15. In his debut season with Zug in 2014–15, Bouchard's transition was seamless in producing as their top-line centre with 51 points in 49 games. On December 23, 2014, he signed a two-year contract extension with Zug. Team captains and coaches of the NLA teams voted Bouchard MVP of the 2015–16 regular season.

On March 18, 2016, Bouchard announced his retirement from professional hockey. Bouchard, who missed more than a year with concussions during his career, commented on his decision, saying he did not want to risk any further health issues.

== Career statistics ==
=== Regular season and playoffs ===
			Regular season					Playoffs
Season	Team	League	GP	G	A	Pts	PIM	GP	G	A	Pts	PIM
1999–2000	Collège Charles-Lemoyne	QMAAA	42	28	45	73	20	9	4	8	12	6
2000–01	Chicoutimi Saguenéens	QMJHL	67	38	57	95	20	6	5	8	13	0
2001–02	Chicoutimi Saguenéens	QMJHL	69	46	94	140	54	4	2	3	5	4
2002–03	Minnesota Wild	NHL	50	7	13	20	18	5	0	1	1	2
2003–04	Minnesota Wild	NHL	61	4	18	22	22	—	—	—	—	—
2004–05	Houston Aeros	AHL	67	12	42	54	46	5	0	1	1	0
2005–06	Minnesota Wild	NHL	80	17	42	59	28	—	—	—	—	—
2006–07	Minnesota Wild	NHL	82	20	37	57	14	5	1	1	2	0
2007–08	Minnesota Wild	NHL	81	13	50	63	34	6	2	2	4	2
2008–09	Minnesota Wild	NHL	71	16	30	46	20	—	—	—	—	—
2009–10	Minnesota Wild	NHL	1	0	0	0	2	—	—	—	—	—
2010–11	Minnesota Wild	NHL	59	12	26	38	14	—	—	—	—	—
2011–12	Minnesota Wild	NHL	37	9	13	22	18	—	—	—	—	—
2012–13	Minnesota Wild	NHL	43	8	12	20	8	5	1	1	2	0
2013–14	New York Islanders	NHL	28	4	5	9	12	—	—	—	—	—
2013–14	Bridgeport Sound Tigers	AHL	20	6	11	17	4	—	—	—	—	—
2013–14	Rockford IceHogs	AHL	24	3	17	20	10	—	—	—	—	—
2014–15	EV Zug	NLA	49	17	34	51	16	6	3	2	5	0
2015–16	EV Zug	NLA	49	12	55	67	20	4	3	2	5	14
NHL totals			593	110	246	356	190	21	4	5	9	4

=== International ===
Year	Team	Event	GP	G	A	Pts	PIM
2001	Canada Quebec	U17	4	0	1	1	2
2002	Canada	WJC18	8	4	8	12	16
2003	Canada	WJC	6	2	3	5	2
Junior totals			18	6	12	18	20

== Awards ==
- CHL Player of the Year – 2001–02
- NHL YoungStars Game – 2004
- NLA top scorer – 2015–16

Awards and achievements
Preceded by Simon Gamache	CHL Player of the Year; 2002	Succeeded by Corey Locke
Preceded by Ales Hemsky	Mike Bossy Trophy winner 2002	Succeeded by Marc-André Fleury
Preceded by Mikko Koivu	Minnesota Wild first-round draft pick 2002	Succeeded by Brent Burns
