= Yanick Lehoux =

Canadian ice hockey player (born 1982)

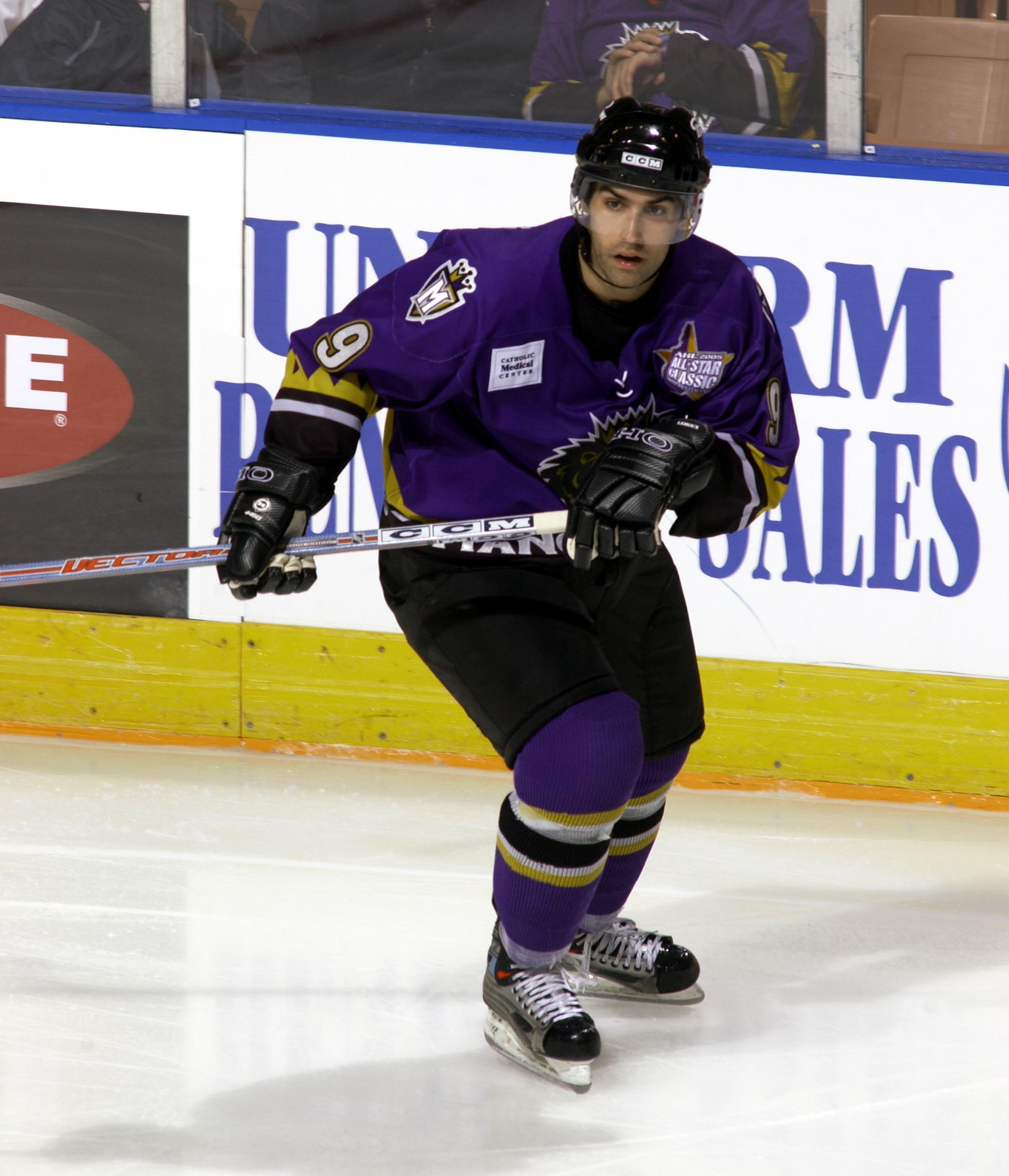
- Lehoux with the Manchester Monarchs during the 2004-05 season
- Born: April 8, 1982 (age 44) Montreal, Quebec, Canada
- Height: 6 ft 1 in (185 cm)
- Weight: 200 lb (91 kg; 14 st 4 lb)
- Position: Centre
- Shot: Right
- team Former teams: Free Agent; Genève-Servette HC; EHC Basel; Phoenix Coyotes; Khimik Voskresensk; Södertälje SK; HC Ambrì-Piotta; Adler Mannheim
- NHL draft: 86th overall, 2000; Los Angeles Kings
- Playing career: 2002–2017

Yanick Lehoux (born April 8, 1982) is a Canadian professional ice hockey forward who is currently an unrestricted free agent. He most recently played for Malmö Redhawks of the Swedish HockeyAllsvenskan.

Lehoux was born in Montreal, Quebec. As a youth, he played in the 1996 Quebec International Pee-Wee Hockey Tournament with the Rive-Nord Elites minor ice hockey team.

He was drafted by the Los Angeles Kings, 86th overall, in the 2000 NHL entry draft. After four seasons within the Kings organization, he attended the Phoenix Coyotes training camp, but was quickly reassigned to the AHL. On July 25, 2008, he was signed by the Montreal Canadiens as an unrestricted free agent to a one-year contract. He was not offered an extension with the Montreal Canadiens.

On July 7, 2009, Lehoux signed for the Swedish club Södertälje SK of the Elitserien.

== Career statistics ==
			Regular season					Playoffs
Season	Team	League	GP	G	A	Pts	PIM	GP	G	A	Pts	PIM
1997–98	Cap–de–la–Madeleine Estacades	QMAAA	42	29	50	79	26	—	—	—	—	—
1998–99	Baie–Comeau Drakkar	QMJHL	63	10	20	30	31	—	—	—	—	—
1999–2000	Baie–Comeau Drakkar	QMJHL	67	31	61	92	14	6	1	2	3	2
2000–01	Baie–Comeau Drakkar	QMJHL	70	67	68	135	62	11	8	16	24	0
2001–02	Baie–Comeau Drakkar	QMJHL	66	56	69	125	63	5	5	4	9	0
2001–02	Manchester Monarchs	AHL	—	—	—	—	—	1	0	0	0	0
2002–03	Manchester Monarchs	AHL	78	16	21	37	26	1	0	0	0	0
2003–04	Manchester Monarchs	AHL	66	14	28	42	22	5	2	3	5	16
2004–05	Manchester Monarchs	AHL	38	23	31	54	16	—	—	—	—	—
2005–06	Genève–Servette HC	NLA	7	5	2	7	6	—	—	—	—	—
2005–06	EHC Basel	NLA	4	0	2	2	4	—	—	—	—	—
2005–06	Phoenix Coyotes	NHL	3	1	0	1	2	—	—	—	—	—
2005–06	Manchester Monarchs	AHL	31	10	6	16	23	—	—	—	—	—
2005–06	San Antonio Rampage	AHL	23	8	6	14	13	—	—	—	—	—
2006–07	San Antonio Rampage	AHL	72	31	42	73	26	—	—	—	—	—
2006–07	Phoenix Coyotes	NHL	7	1	2	3	4	—	—	—	—	—
2007–08	Khimik Moscow Oblast	RSL	16	2	5	7	8	—	—	—	—	—
2007–08	Khimik–2 Moscow Oblast	RUS.3	2	1	2	3	0	—	—	—	—	—
2007–08	San Antonio Rampage	AHL	7	1	3	4	2	—	—	—	—	—
2008–09	Hamilton Bulldogs	AHL	80	19	41	60	38	6	1	1	2	4
2009–10	Södertälje SK	SEL	39	12	19	31	18	—	—	—	—	—
2010–11	HC Ambrì–Piotta	NLA	26	14	8	22	8	—	—	—	—	—
2010–11	Södertälje SK	SEL	19	2	5	7	14	—	—	—	—	—
2011–12	Adler Mannheim	DEL	52	17	26	43	16	14	4	11	15	4
2012–13	Adler Mannheim	DEL	52	20	37	57	30	6	1	1	2	2
2013–14	Adler Mannheim	DEL	35	7	16	23	51	—	—	—	—	—
2014–15	Malmö Redhawks	Allsv	15	4	3	7	16	—	—	—	—	—
2015–16	Thetford Assurancia	LNAH	8	1	5	6	2	3	0	0	0	0
2016–17	Thetford Assurancia	LNAH	11	3	8	11	0	—	—	—	—	—
AHL totals			395	122	179	301	166	13	3	4	7	20
NHL totals			10	2	2	4	6	—	—	—	—	—
DEL totals			139	44	79	123	97	20	5	12	17	6

== Transactions ==
- June 24, 2000 - Drafted by the Los Angeles Kings in the 3rd round, 86th overall.
- November 5, 2005 - Claimed off waivers by the Phoenix Coyotes.
- November 25, 2005 - Claimed off waivers by the Los Angeles Kings.
- March 9, 2006 - Traded to the Phoenix Coyotes for Tim Jackman.
- July 25, 2008 - Signed as an unrestricted free agent by the Montreal Canadiens.
- July 13, 2011 - Signed as an unrestricted free agent by Adler Mannheim (Ger)
