= Tim Jackman =

American ice hockey player (born 1981)

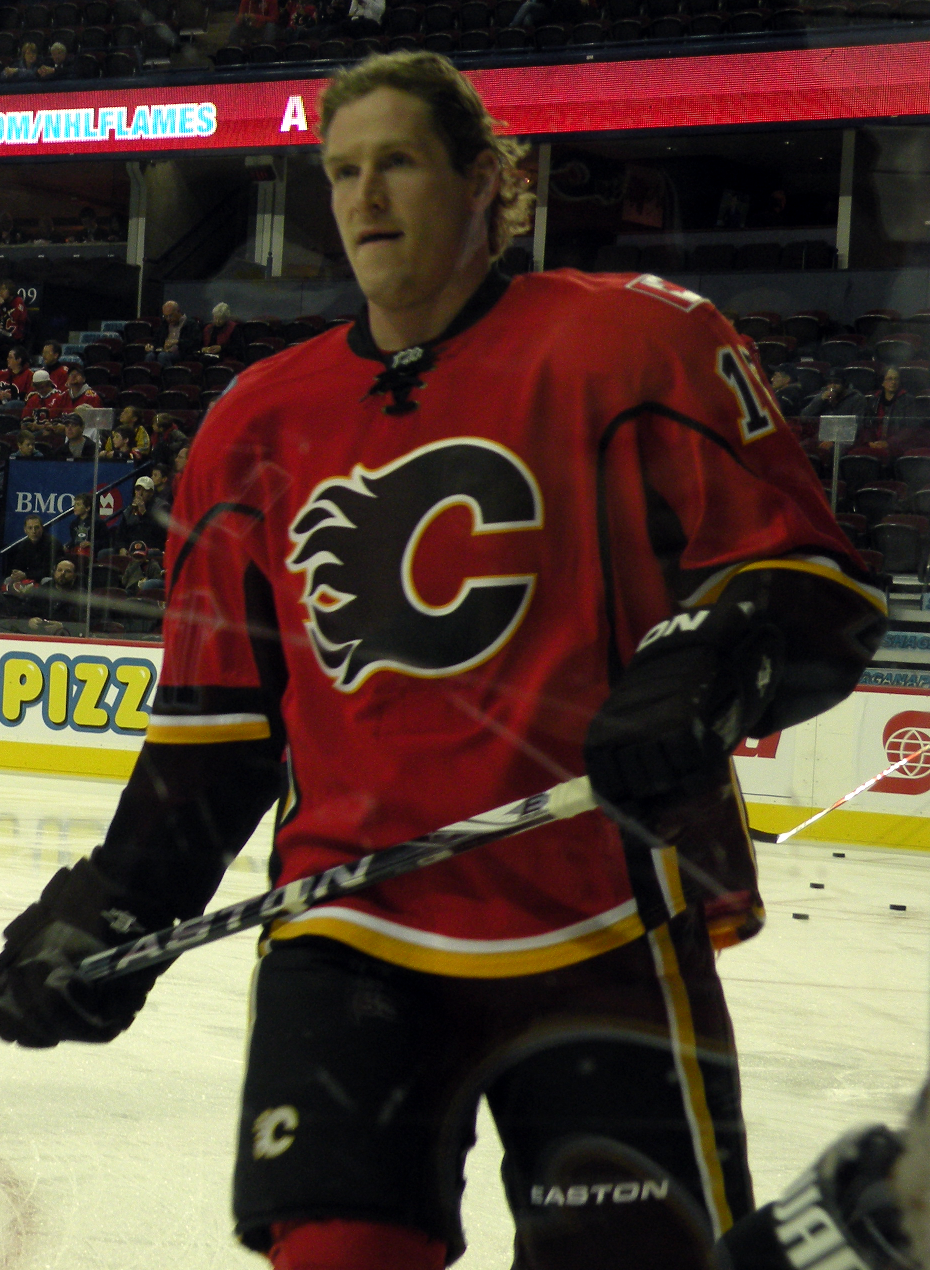
- Jackman with the Calgary Flames in 2010
- Born: November 14, 1981 (age 44) Minot, North Dakota, U.S.
- Height: 6 ft 2 in (188 cm)
- Weight: 225 lb (102 kg; 16 st 1 lb)
- Position: Right wing
- Shot: Right
- Played for: Columbus Blue Jackets; Phoenix Coyotes; Los Angeles Kings; New York Islanders; Calgary Flames; Anaheim Ducks
- NHL draft: 38th overall, 2001; Columbus Blue Jackets
- Playing career: 2002–2016

Timothy M. Jackman (born November 14, 1981) is an American former professional ice hockey player. He was the first player from Minnesota State University, Mankato to be drafted after becoming the Columbus Blue Jackets' second round selection, 38th overall, at the 2001 NHL entry draft. Jackman made his NHL debut during the 2003–04 season with Columbus, and has also played for the Phoenix Coyotes, Los Angeles Kings, New York Islanders, Calgary Flames and Anaheim Ducks.

== Playing career ==
Jackman attended Park Center Senior High School in Brooklyn Park, Minnesota, where he earned all-conference honors in 1998–99 and 1999–2000, and also earning all-state honors in the latter season. He then attended Minnesota State University, Mankato for two seasons between 2000 and 2002. A second-round selection of the Columbus Blue Jackets, 38th overall in the 2001 NHL entry draft, Jackman became the first player from MSU-Mankato to be drafted by an NHL team. Jackman chose to forgo his final two years of college eligibility, signing a contract with the Blue Jackets in the summer of 2002, and went on to become the school's first alumnus to play in the NHL.

Jackman was assigned to Columbus' American Hockey League (AHL) affiliate, the Syracuse Crunch for the 2002–03 season. He appeared in 77 games for the Crunch, scoring 9 goals and 16 points. He spent the majority of the 2003–04 season with Syracuse, scoring 23 goals in 64 games, but spent some time with Columbus. He made his NHL debut on December 20, 2003, in a game against the Minnesota Wild, and scored his first goal, assist and points on February 27, 2004, in a 4–3 victory over the Chicago Blackhawks.

Following a third season with Columbus in 2004–05, Jackman was traded to the Phoenix Coyotes on October 8, 2005. He went to Phoenix with Geoff Sanderson in exchange for Cale Hulse, Jason Chimera and Mike Rupp. He appeared in eight games with the Coyotes, but spent the majority of the 2005–06 season with the AHL's San Antonio Rampage. Late that same season, on March 9, 2006, he was again traded, to the Los Angeles Kings for Yanick Lehoux. Jackman finished the season in the AHL with the Manchester Monarchs.

Jackman played most of the 2006–07 AHL season in Manchester, appearing in only five games with Los Angeles. He left the Kings organization following the season as a free agent, signing a contract with the New York Islanders. He split time between the Islanders and the Bridgeport Sound Tigers, scoring 1 goal in 36 NHL games and 15 in 44 AHL games. Jackman finally established himself as an NHL regular in 2008–09, appearing in 69 games with New York, scoring 5 goals and 12 points. He led the team in penalty minutes and hits with 155 and 151 respectively, and was named the recipient of the Bob Nystrom Award, and Islanders team award given to the player who beset demonstrates leadership, hustle and dedication. Jackman again led the Islanders in penalty minutes in 2009–10 with 98, and celebrated his birthday on November 14, 2009, by scoring a goal 16 seconds into the contest against the Florida Panthers. According to the Elias Sports Bureau it was the fastest goal in NHL history by a player on his birthday.

Jackman left the Islanders after the season, signing with the Calgary Flames. He was brought in to bring a physical presence to the Flames lineup, but added an offensive presence for the Flames while playing in a limited role. He scored a career-high 10 goals during the 2010–11 NHL season, only one shy of his career total entering the season. He was named recipient of the J. R. "Bud" McCaig Award, given to a Flames player who exhibits respect, courtesy and compassion.

On November 21, 2013, he was traded to the Anaheim Ducks for a 6th round pick in 2014.

In the 2015–16 season, Jackman played in two games with the Ducks before he was placed on waivers and reassigned to their AHL affiliate, the San Diego Gulls on November 3, 2015. At the trade deadline, Jackman's tenure with the Ducks came to an end as he was traded to the Chicago Blackhawks in exchange for Corey Tropp. Despite the trade, Jackman was assigned to continue with the San Diego Gulls for the remainder of the season before sitting out to undergo back surgery.

In the following off-season, Jackman opted out of contract to end his professional career, returning to Minnesota State University to complete an Education degree and contribute to the Coaching staff with the Mavericks.

== Career statistics ==
			Regular season					Playoffs
Season	Team	League	GP	G	A	Pts	PIM	GP	G	A	Pts	PIM
1998–99	Park Center Senior High School	HSMN	22	22	22	44	—	—	—	—	—	—
1999–2000	Park Center Senior High School	HSMN	19	34	22	56	—	—	—	—	—	—
1999–2000	Twin City Vulcans	USHL	25	11	9	20	58	13	8	5	13	12
2000–01	Minnesota State University, Mankato	WCHA	37	11	14	25	92	—	—	—	—	—
2001–02	Minnesota State University, Mankato	WCHA	36	14	14	28	86	—	—	—	—	—
2002–03	Syracuse Crunch	AHL	77	9	7	16	48	—	—	—	—	—
2003–04	Syracuse Crunch	AHL	64	23	13	36	61	7	2	3	5	12
2003–04	Columbus Blue Jackets	NHL	19	1	2	3	16	—	—	—	—	—
2004–05	Syracuse Crunch	AHL	73	14	21	35	98	—	—	—	—	—
2005–06	San Antonio Rampage	AHL	50	7	13	20	127	—	—	—	—	—
2005–06	Phoenix Coyotes	NHL	8	0	0	0	21	—	—	—	—	—
2005–06	Manchester Monarchs	AHL	18	2	3	5	33	7	0	3	3	20
2006–07	Manchester Monarchs	AHL	69	19	14	33	143	16	3	3	6	26
2006–07	Los Angeles Kings	NHL	5	0	0	0	10	—	—	—	—	—
2007–08	Bridgeport Sound Tigers	AHL	44	15	21	36	67	—	—	—	—	—
2007–08	New York Islanders	NHL	36	1	3	4	57	—	—	—	—	—
2008–09	Bridgeport Sound Tigers	AHL	12	6	1	7	35	—	—	—	—	—
2008–09	New York Islanders	NHL	69	5	7	12	155	—	—	—	—	—
2009–10	New York Islanders	NHL	54	4	5	9	98	—	—	—	—	—
2010–11	Calgary Flames	NHL	82	10	13	23	86	—	—	—	—	—
2011–12	Calgary Flames	NHL	75	1	6	7	94	—	—	—	—	—
2012–13	Calgary Flames	NHL	42	1	4	5	76	—	—	—	—	—
2013–14	Calgary Flames	NHL	10	1	0	1	41	—	—	—	—	—
2013–14	Anaheim Ducks	NHL	26	3	1	4	62	—	—	—	—	—
2014–15	Anaheim Ducks	NHL	55	5	2	7	86	9	0	0	0	12
2015–16	Anaheim Ducks	NHL	2	0	0	0	4	—	—	—	—	—
2015–16	San Diego Gulls	AHL	22	1	1	2	33	—	—	—	—	—
NHL totals			483	32	43	75	806	9	0	0	0	12
