= Pascal Pelletier =

Canadian ice hockey player (born 1983)

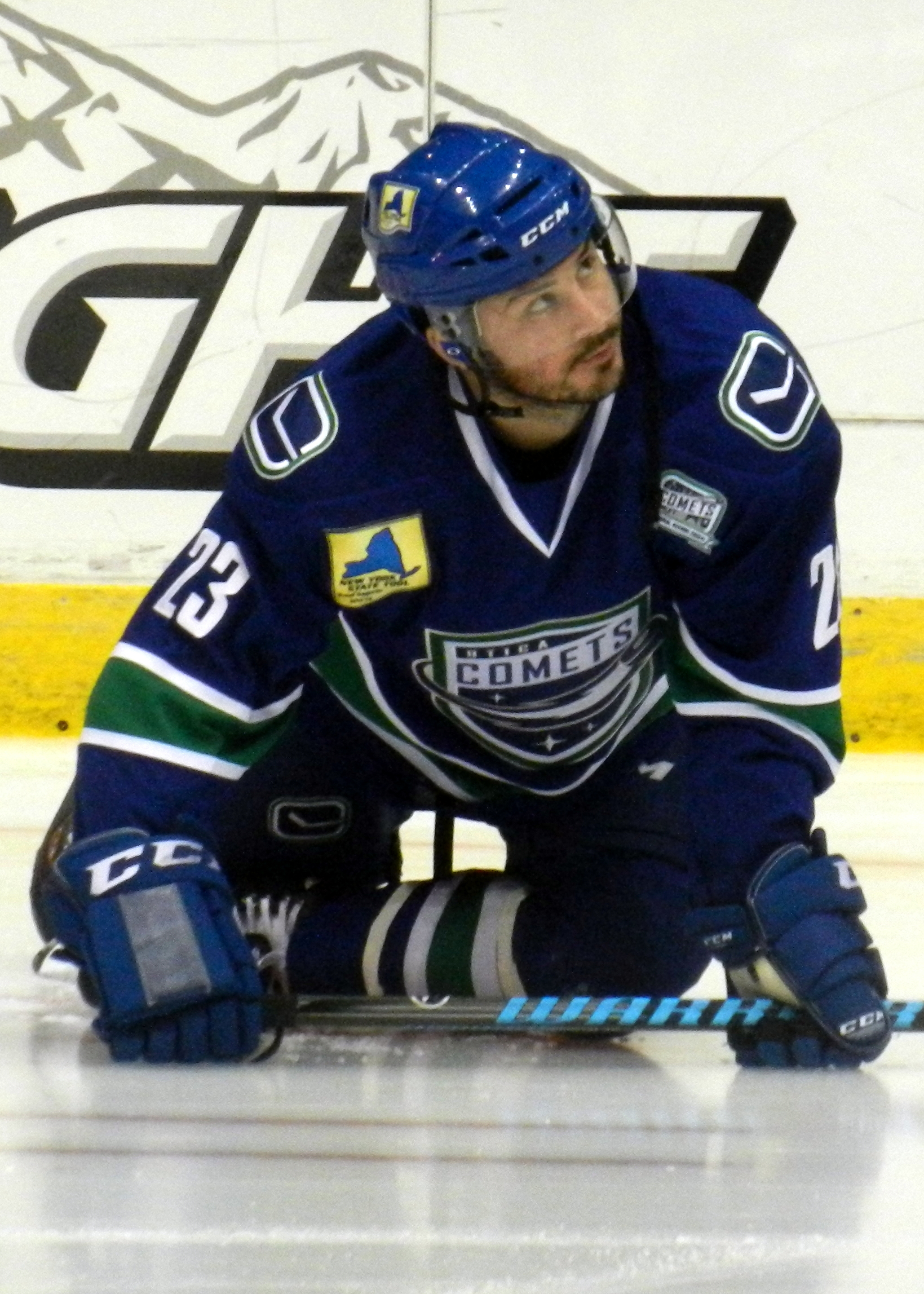
- Born: June 16, 1983 (age 43) Labrador City, Newfoundland, Canada
- Height: 5 ft 11 in (180 cm)
- Weight: 197 lb (89 kg; 14 st 1 lb)
- Position: Left wing
- Shot: Left
- Played for: Boston Bruins; Chicago Blackhawks; SCL Tigers; Vancouver Canucks; KHL Medveščak Zagreb; Admiral Vladivostok; Jokerit; ZSC Lions
- NHL draft: Undrafted
- Playing career: 2004–2020

Pascal Pelletier (born June 16, 1983) is a Canadian former professional ice hockey forward. He most recently played for the ZSC Lions of the National League (NL). He is one of four players from Labrador to play in the NHL. Pelletier was born in Labrador City, Newfoundland and Labrador.

== Playing career ==
As a youth, Pelletier played in the 1996 and 1997 Quebec International Pee-Wee Hockey Tournaments with a minor ice hockey team from Quebec City.

Undrafted, Pelletier played in the Quebec Major Junior Hockey League before making his professional debut in the ECHL with the Louisiana IceGators. In the 2005–06 season, Pelletier was signed to an AHL contract with the Providence Bruins and after a solid season was signed to an NHL contract with parent club, the Boston Bruins, on August 7, 2006.

Pelletier made his NHL debut with the Boston Bruins during the 2007–08 season, he was first recalled from Providence on January 16, 2008. Pelletier played in a total of six games. On July 24, 2008, Pelletier was traded by the Bruins to the Chicago Blackhawks for Martin St. Pierre. He signed a one-year contract with the Blackhawks on August 8, 2008.

After a year playing for the Blackhawks' AHL affiliate the Rockford IceHogs, Pelletier signed a one-year deal with Columbus Blue Jackets of the NHL for the 2009–10 season. On December 8, 2009, he was traded to the St. Louis Blues for Brendan Bell and Tomas Kana. He was immediately sent to their affiliate the Peoria Rivermen.

On May 19, 2010, Pelletier left for Europe signing a one-year contract with Swiss team, the SCL Tigers of the National League A.

On July 5, 2013, Pelletier returned to North America after three seasons with the SCL Tigers, signing a one-year two-way contract with the Vancouver Canucks. He was assigned to begin the 2013–14 season with AHL affiliate, the Utica Comets. He was recalled to the Canucks on October 20, and played his first NHL game since 2009.

On June 24, 2014, receiving limited opportunity in his single season with the Canucks, Pelletier opted to return to Europe in signing a one-year contract with Croatian club, Medveščak Zagreb the KHL.

After a single season with the Canucks AHL affiliate, the Utica Comets in 2016–17, Pelletier returned to Switzerland in agreeing to a contract with the GCK Lions of the Swiss League on August 14, 2017.

Medal record

Ice hockey

Representing Canada

Spengler Cup
| Gold medal – first place | 2012 Davos | |

== Career statistics ==
| | | | Regular season | | | | | Playoffs |
| Season | Team | League | GP | G | A | Pts | PIM | GP | G | A | Pts | PIM |
|---|---|---|---|---|---|---|---|---|---|---|---|---|
| 2000–01 | Baie-Comeau Drakkar | QMJHL | 70 | 15 | 44 | 59 | 176 | 11 | 2 | 11 | 13 | 6 |
| 2001–02 | Baie-Comeau Drakkar | QMJHL | 56 | 12 | 25 | 37 | 115 | 5 | 3 | 4 | 7 | 0 |
| 2002–03 | Baie-Comeau Drakkar | QMJHL | 67 | 46 | 55 | 101 | 113 | 12 | 5 | 7 | 12 | 14 |
| 2003–04 | Shawinigan Cataractes | QMJHL | 64 | 39 | 52 | 91 | 85 | 11 | 3 | 9 | 12 | 20 |
| 2004–05 | Louisiana IceGators | ECHL | 61 | 10 | 28 | 38 | 75 | — | — | — | — | — |
| 2004–05 | Gwinnett Gladiators | ECHL | 6 | 0 | 1 | 1 | 2 | 5 | 0 | 2 | 2 | 2 |
| 2005–06 | Gwinnett Gladiators | ECHL | 21 | 18 | 12 | 30 | 18 | — | — | — | — | — |
| 2005–06 | Providence Bruins | AHL | 53 | 20 | 26 | 46 | 42 | 6 | 2 | 4 | 6 | 23 |
| 2006–07 | Providence Bruins | AHL | 80 | 14 | 35 | 49 | 60 | 13 | 5 | 4 | 9 | 16 |
| 2007–08 | Providence Bruins | AHL | 73 | 37 | 38 | 75 | 66 | 10 | 6 | 6 | 12 | 4 |
| 2007–08 | Boston Bruins | NHL | 6 | 0 | 0 | 0 | 0 | — | — | — | — | — |
| 2008–09 | Rockford IceHogs | AHL | 71 | 29 | 26 | 55 | 45 | 4 | 1 | 0 | 1 | 6 |
| 2008–09 | Chicago Blackhawks | NHL | 7 | 0 | 0 | 0 | 0 | — | — | — | — | — |
| 2009–10 | Syracuse Crunch | AHL | 25 | 3 | 13 | 16 | 23 | — | — | — | — | — |
| 2009–10 | Peoria Rivermen | AHL | 55 | 14 | 28 | 42 | 41 | — | — | — | — | — |
| 2010–11 | SCL Tigers | NLA | 47 | 17 | 21 | 38 | 95 | 4 | 1 | 1 | 2 | 29 |
| 2011–12 | SCL Tigers | NLA | 43 | 14 | 22 | 36 | 71 | — | — | — | — | — |
| 2012–13 | SCL Tigers | NLA | 46 | 19 | 16 | 35 | 76 | — | — | — | — | — |
| 2013–14 | Utica Comets | AHL | 69 | 22 | 40 | 62 | 64 | — | — | — | — | — |
| 2013–14 | Vancouver Canucks | NHL | 3 | 0 | 0 | 0 | 0 | — | — | — | — | — |
| 2014–15 | KHL Medveščak Zagreb | KHL | 57 | 16 | 23 | 39 | 44 | — | — | — | — | — |
| 2015–16 | Admiral Vladivostok | KHL | 16 | 0 | 4 | 4 | 12 | — | — | — | — | — |
| 2015–16 | Jokerit | KHL | 19 | 3 | 4 | 7 | 4 | — | — | — | — | — |
| 2016–17 | Utica Comets | AHL | 52 | 10 | 18 | 28 | 20 | — | — | — | — | — |
| 2017–18 | GCK Lions | SL | 18 | 5 | 15 | 20 | 8 | — | — | — | — | — |
| 2017–18 | ZSC Lions | NL | 23 | 2 | 2 | 4 | 12 | 5 | 0 | 0 | 0 | 2 |
| AHL totals | | | 478 | 149 | 224 | 373 | 361 | 33 | 14 | 14 | 28 | 49 |
| NHL totals | | | 16 | 0 | 0 | 0 | 0 | — | — | — | — | — |

== Awards and honours ==
| Award | Year |
|---|---|
AHL
| All-Star Game | 2008 |
| First All-Star Team | 2008 |
KHL
| All-Star Game | 2015 |
