= 2002–03 QMJHL season =

Canadian junior ice hockey season

The 2002–03 QMJHL season was the 34th season in the history of the Quebec Major Junior Hockey League. The league discontinues the AutoPro Plaque and Philips Plaque as those sponsorships expire. The St-Clair Group Plaque is renamed the Jean Sawyer Trophy. Sixteen teams played 72 games each in the schedule. The Baie-Comeau Drakkar finished first overall in the regular season winning their first Jean Rougeau Trophy. The Hull Olympiques won their fifth President's Cup, defeating the Halifax Mooseheads in the finals.

== Final standings ==
Note: GP = Games played; W = Wins; L = Losses; T = Ties; OL = Overtime loss; PTS = Points; GF = Goals for; GA = Goals against

=== Lebel Conference ===
West Division	GP	W	L	T	OTL	Pts	GF	GA
y-Val-d'Or Foreurs	72	39	23	6	4	88	241	221
x-Hull Olympiques	72	39	27	4	2	84	266	222
x-Montreal Rocket	72	32	27	5	8	77	256	261
x-Rouyn-Noranda Huskies	72	31	33	0	8	70	268	273
Central Division	GP	W	L	T	OL	Pts	GF	GA
y-Victoriaville Tigres	72	38	26	6	2	84	265	237
x-Sherbrooke Castors	72	37	25	7	3	84	237	214
x-Shawinigan Cataractes	72	25	35	8	4	62	209	249
Drummondville Voltigeurs	72	15	49	4	4	38	176	313

=== Dilio Conference ===
East Division	GP	W	L	T	OL	Pts	GF	GA
y-Baie-Comeau Drakkar	72	50	14	6	2	108	319	213
x-Quebec Remparts	72	42	24	3	3	90	278	205
x-Chicoutimi Saguenéens	72	28	40	1	3	60	239	292
Rimouski Océanic	72	11	58	3	0	25	190	385
Atlantic Division	GP	W	L	T	OL	Pts	GF	GA
y-Halifax Mooseheads	72	44	15	10	3	101	289	206
x-Acadie-Bathurst Titan	72	44	21	4	3	95	276	189
x-Moncton Wildcats	72	37	20	10	5	89	255	216
x-Cape Breton Screaming Eagles	72	21	37	9	5	56	200	268

y-won division
x-made playoffs

- complete list of standings.

== Scoring leaders ==
Note: GP = Games played; G = Goals; A = Assists; Pts = Points; PIM = Penalty minutes

Player	Team	GP	G	A	Pts	PIM
Joel Perrault	Baie-Comeau Drakkar	70	51	65	116	93
Jonathan Gagnon	Rouyn-Noranda Huskies	67	52	63	115	172
Patrick Thoresen	Baie-Comeau Drakkar	71	33	75	108	57
Pierre-Luc Sleigher	Victoriaville Tigres	66	38	67	105	226
Maxime Talbot	Hull Olympiques	69	46	58	104	130
Olivier Filion	Acadie-Bathurst Titan	71	36	68	104	62
Pierre-Alexandre Parenteau	Chicoutimi / Sherbrooke	59	33	70	103	140
Olivier Proulx	Drummondville / Baie-Comeau	70	39	63	102	150
Steve Bernier	Moncton Wildcats	71	49	52	101	90
Pascal Pelletier	Baie-Comeau Drakkar	67	46	55	101	113

- complete scoring statistics

== Playoffs ==
Conference Quarterfinals
D4	Québec	4
D5	Moncton	2
D2	Halifax	4
D7	Cape Breton	0
D3	Acadie Bathurst	4
D6	Chicoutimi	0
L2	Victoriaville	0
L7	Shawinigan	4
L3	Hull	4
L6	Rouyn-Noranda	0
L4	Sherbrooke	4
L5	Montreal	3

Conference Semifinals
D1	Baie-Comeau	4
D4	Québec	1
D2	Halifax	4
D3	Acadie-Bathurst	3
L1	Val-d'Or	4
L7	Shawinigan	1
L3	Hull	4
L4	Sherbrooke	1

Conference Finals
D1	Baie-Comeau	3
D2	Halifax	4
L1	Val-d'Or	0
L3	Hull	4

President's Cup Finals
D2	Halifax	3
L3	Hull	4

== All-star teams ==
First team

- Goaltender - Adam Russo, Acadie-Bathurst Titan
- Left defence - Jesse Lane, Hull Olympiques / Victoriaville
- Right defence - Maxime Fortunus, Baie-Comeau Drakkar
- Left winger - Timofei Shishkanov, Quebec Remparts
- Centreman - Joel Perrault, Baie-Comeau Drakkar
- Right winger - Jonathan Gagnon, Rouyn-Noranda Huskies
- Coach - Shawn MacKenzie, Halifax Mooseheads

Second team

- Goaltender - Marc-Andre Fleury, Cape Breton Screaming Eagles
- Left defence - Alexandre Rouleau, Val-d'Or Foreurs / Quebec Remparts
- Right defence - Bruno Gervais, Acadie-Bathurst Titan
- Left winger - Olivier Filion, Acadie-Bathurst Titan
- Centreman - Maxime Talbot, Hull Olympiques
- Right winger - Steve Bernier, Moncton Wildcats
- Coach - Richard Martel, Baie-Comeau Drakkar

Rookie team

- Goaltender - David Tremblay, Hull Olympiques & Jean-Michel Filiatrault, Victoriaville Tigres / Quebec Remparts
- Left defence - Mario Scalzo, Victoriaville Tigres
- Right defence - Jim Sharrow, Halifax Mooseheads
- Left winger - Kevin Mailhiot, Drummondville Voltigeurs
- Centreman - Petr Vrana, Halifax Mooseheads
- Right winger - Olivier Labelle, Hull Olympiques
- Coach - Judes Vallee, Victoriaville Tigres
- List of First/Second/Rookie team all-stars.

== Trophies and awards ==
Team

- President's Cup - Playoff Champions, Hull Olympiques
- Jean Rougeau Trophy - Regular Season Champions, Baie-Comeau Drakkar
- Luc Robitaille Trophy - Team that scored the most goals, Baie-Comeau Drakkar
- Robert Lebel Trophy - Team with best GAA, Acadie-Bathurst Titan

Player

- Michel Brière Memorial Trophy - Most Valuable Player, Joel Perrault, Baie-Comeau Drakkar
- Jean Béliveau Trophy - Top Scorer, Joel Perrault, Baie-Comeau Drakkar
- Guy Lafleur Trophy - Playoff MVP, Maxime Talbot, Hull Olympiques
- Telus Cup – Offensive - Offensive Player of the Year, Pierre-Luc Sleigher, Victoriaville Tigres
- Telus Cup – Defensive - Defensive Player of the Year, Marc-Andre Fleury, Cape Breton Screaming Eagles
- Jacques Plante Memorial Trophy - Best GAA, Adam Russo, Acadie-Bathurst Titan
- Emile Bouchard Trophy - Defenceman of the Year, Maxime Fortunus, Baie-Comeau Drakkar
- Mike Bossy Trophy - Best Pro Prospect, Marc-André Fleury, Cape Breton Screaming Eagles
- RDS Cup - Rookie of the Year, Petr Vrana, Halifax Mooseheads
- Michel Bergeron Trophy - Offensive Rookie of the Year, Petr Vrana, Halifax Mooseheads
- Raymond Lagacé Trophy - Defensive Rookie of the Year, Mario Scalzo, Victoriaville Tigres
- Frank J. Selke Memorial Trophy - Most sportsmanlike player, Patrick Thoresen, Baie-Comeau Drakkar
- QMJHL Humanitarian of the Year - Humanitarian of the Year, A.J. MacLean, Halifax Mooseheads & David Massé, Québec Remparts
- Marcel Robert Trophy - Best Scholastic Player, Eric L'Italien, Rouyn-Noranda Huskies
- Paul Dumont Trophy - Personality of the Year, Jean-Francois Plourde, Sherbrooke Castors

Executive

- Ron Lapointe Trophy - Coach of the Year, Shawn MacKenzie, Halifax Mooseheads
- John Horman Trophy - Executive of the Year, Sylvie Fortier, Baie-Comeau Drakkar
- Jean Sawyer Trophy - Marketing Director of the Year, Michel Boisvert, Shawinigan Cataractes

== See also ==
- 2003 Memorial Cup
- 2003 NHL entry draft
- 2002–03 OHL season
- 2002–03 WHL season

Preceded by 2001–02 QMJHL season	QMJHL seasons	Succeeded by 2003–04 QMJHL season
