= 2004–05 QMJHL season =

Canadian junior ice hockey season

- League: Quebec Major Junior Hockey League
- Sport: Hockey
- Duration: Regular season September 11, 2003 – March 14, 2004; Playoffs; March 19 – May 9, 2004
- Teams: 16

Draft
- Top draft pick: James Sheppard
- Picked by: Cape Breton Screaming Eagles

Regular season
- Jean Rougeau Trophy: Rimouski Océanic (2)
- Season MVP: Sidney Crosby (Rimouski Océanic)
- Top scorer: Sidney Crosby (Rimouski Océanic)

Playoffs
- Playoffs MVP: Sidney Crosby (Océanic)
- Finals champions: Rimouski Océanic (2)
- Runners-up: Halifax Mooseheads

QMJHL seasons
- 2003–04 2005–06

2004–05 CHL season
- League: Canadian Hockey League
- Sport: Hockey
- Duration: OHL; September 23, 2004 – March 20, 2005; QMJHL; September 16, 2004 – March 20, 2005; WHL; September 24, 2004 – March 20, 2005
- Teams: 60
- Season MVP: Sidney Crosby (Rimouski Océanic) (QMJHL)
- Top scorer: Sidney Crosby (Rimouski Océanic) (QMJHL)

Memorial Cup
- Finals champions: London Knights (OHL) (1st title)
- Runners-up: Rimouski Océanic (QMJHL)

The 2004–05 QMJHL season was the 36th season in the history of the Quebec Major Junior Hockey League. The QMJHL inaugurates the Guy Carbonneau Trophy, awarded to the league's "Best Defensive Forward," and the Kevin Lowe Trophy, awarded to the league's "Best Defensive Defenceman." Sixteen teams played 70 games each in the schedule.

Sidney Crosby was the league's top scorer, regular season MVP, Playoff leading scorer, and playoff MVP. Crosby helped lead the Rimouski Océanic on a 28-game unbeaten streak to close out the season, and finishing first overall in the regular season winning their second Jean Rougeau Trophy. Rimouski extended its unbeaten streak to 35 games in the playoffs, and lost only once, en route to winning their second President's Cup, defeating the Halifax Mooseheads in the finals.

== 2004 QMJHL Entry Draft ==
=== First round picks ===
- 1 James Sheppard (W) 1988-04-25
- 2 Alex Lamontagne (D) 1988-04-07
- 3 Jason Legault (D) 1988-02-23
- 4 Benjamin Breault (C) 1988-02-21
- 5 Pier-Alexandre Poulin (C) 1988-02-18
- 6 Henrick Lavoie (W) 1988-01-14
- 7 Peter-James Corsi (C) 1988-08-03
- 8 Jonathan Bernier (G) 1988-08-07
- 9 Yannick Riendeau (W) 1988-06-18
- 10 Maxime Tanguay (C) 1988-11-16
- 11 Alex Biega (D) 1988-04-04
- 12 Guillaume Durand (D) 1988-02-02
- 13 Pascal Boutin (D) 1988-05-14
- 14 Wesley Welcher (C) 1987-09-14
- 15 Maxim Noreau (D) 1987-05-24
- 16 Nicolas Blanchard (C) 1987-05-31
  - Source:

== Final standings ==
Note: GP = Games played; W = Wins; L = Losses; T = Ties; OL = Overtime loss; PTS = Points; GF = Goals for; GA = Goals against

Western Division	GP	W	L	T	OTL	Pts	GF	GA
y-Rouyn-Noranda Huskies	70	31	23	11	5	78	266	244
x-Shawinigan Cataractes	70	31	25	12	2	76	199	188
x-Gatineau Olympiques	70	33	28	5	4	75	216	237
x-Drummondville Voltigeurs	70	28	27	9	6	71	215	217
x-Victoriaville Tigres	70	26	36	4	4	60	186	254
Val-d'Or Foreurs	70	21	37	10	2	54	189	236

Eastern Division	GP	W	L	T	OTL	Pts	GF	GA
y-Rimouski Océanic	70	45	17	5	3	98	333	239
x-Chicoutimi Saguenéens	70	38	19	6	7	89	264	217
x-Quebec Remparts	70	38	22	5	5	86	267	205
x-Lewiston Maineiacs	70	32	30	8	0	72	214	209
x-Baie-Comeau Drakkar	70	24	37	5	4	57	208	280

Atlantic Division	GP	W	L	T	OTL	Pts	GF	GA
y-Halifax Mooseheads	70	42	16	10	2	96	242	172
x-Moncton Wildcats	70	37	23	8	2	84	206	175
x-Cape Breton Screaming Eagles	70	32	27	8	3	75	206	195
P.E.I. Rocket	70	24	39	7	0	55	198	260
Acadie-Bathurst Titan	70	18	42	7	3	46	163	244

y-received first-round bye
x-made playoffs

- complete list of standings.

== Scoring leaders ==
Note: GP = Games played; G = Goals; A = Assists; Pts = Points; PIM = Penalty minutes

Player	Team	GP	G	A	Pts	PIM
Sidney Crosby	Rimouski Océanic	62	66	102	168	84
Dany Roussin	Rimouski Océanic	69	54	62	116	66
Marc-Antoine Pouliot	Rimouski Océanic	70	45	69	114	83
Maxime Boisclair	Chicoutimi Saguenéens	70	51	57	108	84
David Desharnais	Chicoutimi Saguenéens	68	32	65	97	39
Stanislav Lascek	Chicoutimi Saguenéens	53	18	72	90	92
Alex Bourret	Lewiston Maineiacs	65	31	55	86	172
Alexandre Picard	Lewiston Maineiacs	65	40	45	85	160
Josh Hennessy	Quebec Remparts	68	35	50	85	39
Brent Aubin	Rouyn-Noranda Huskies	70	41	43	84	78

- complete scoring statistics

== Canada-Russia Challenge ==
The 2004 ADT Canada-Russia Challenge was hosted by Quebec City and Montreal. On November 21, 2004, the Russian Selects defeated the QMJHL All-stars 4–3 in a shootout (2–0) at the Colisée Pepsi. On November 22, 2004, the Russian Selects defeated the QMJHL All-stars 4–3 in a shootout (3–0) at the Bell Centre. Since the tournament began in 2003, the Russian Selects had an all-time record of 3 wins and 1 loss versus the QMJHL All-stars.

== Playoffs ==
Each regular season division winner received a first round bye, and ranked 1st, 2nd, and 3rd overall. Remaining teams were ranked 4th to 13th, regardless of division.

Sidney Crosby was the leading scorer of the playoffs with 31 points (14 goals, 17 assists).

First round
7	Shawinigan	0
10	Lewiston	4
4	Chicoutimi	4
13	Baie-Comeau	2
5	Quebec	4
12	Victoriaville	3
8	Gatineau	4
9	Cape Breton	1
6	Moncton	4
11	Drummondville	2

Quarterfinals
1	Rimouski	4
10	Lewiston	0
4	Chicoutimi	4
5	Quebec	2
2	Halifax	4
8	Gatineau	1
3	Rouyn-Noranda	4
6	Moncton	2

Semifinals
1	Rimouski	4
4	Chicoutimi	1
2	Halifax	4
3	Rouyn-Noranda	0

Finals
1	Rimouski	4
2	Halifax	0

== All-star teams ==
Coaches were no longer named to all-star teams as of the 2004–05 season.

First team

- Goaltender - Julien Ellis, Shawinigan Cataractes
- Left defence - Nicolas Marcotte, Chicoutimi Saguenéens
- Right defence - Mario Scalzo, Victoriaville Tigres / Rimouski Océanic
- Left winger - Maxime Boisclair, Chicoutimi Saguenéens
- Centreman - Marc-Antoine Pouliot, Rimouski Océanic
- Right winger - Sidney Crosby, Rimouski Océanic

Second team

- Goaltender - Corey Crawford, Moncton Wildcats
- Left defence - Sam Roberts, Gatineau Olympiques
- Right defence - Alexandre Picard, Lewiston Maineiacs
- Left winger - Dany Roussin, Rimouski Océanic
- Centreman - David Desharnais, Chicoutimi Saguenéens
- Right winger - Alex Bourret, Lewiston Maineiacs

Rookie team

- Goaltender - Maxime Joyal, Quebec Remparts
- Left defence - Oskars Bartulis, Moncton Wildcats
- Right defence - Kris Letang, Val-d'Or Foreurs
- Left winger - Vyacheslav Trukhno, P.E.I. Rocket
- Centreman - Derick Brassard, Drummondville Voltigeurs
- Right winger - Alexander Radulov, Quebec Remparts
- List of First/Second/Rookie team all-stars.

== Trophies and awards ==
Team

- President's Cup - Playoff Champions, Rimouski Océanic
- Jean Rougeau Trophy - Regular Season Champions, Rimouski Océanic
- Luc Robitaille Trophy - Team that scored the most goals, Rimouski Océanic
- Robert Lebel Trophy - Team with best GAA, Halifax Mooseheads

Player

- Michel Brière Memorial Trophy - Most Valuable Player, Sidney Crosby, Rimouski Océanic
- Jean Béliveau Trophy - Top Scorer, Sidney Crosby, Rimouski Océanic
- Guy Lafleur Trophy - Playoff MVP, Sidney Crosby, Rimouski Océanic
- Telus Cup – Offensive - Offensive Player of the Year, Sidney Crosby, Rimouski Océanic
- Telus Cup – Defensive - Defensive Player of the Year, Martin Houle, Cape Breton Screaming Eagles
- Jacques Plante Memorial Trophy - Best GAA, Julien Ellis, Shawinigan Cataractes
- Guy Carbonneau Trophy - Best Defensive Forward, Simon Courcelles, Quebec Remparts
- Emile Bouchard Trophy - Defenceman of the Year, Mario Scalzo, Rimouski Océanic & Victoriaville Tigres
- Kevin Lowe Trophy - Best Defensive Defenceman, Nathan Saunders, Moncton Wildcats
- Mike Bossy Trophy - Best Pro Prospect, Sidney Crosby, Rimouski Oceanic
- RDS Cup - Rookie of the Year, Derick Brassard, Drummondville Voltigeurs
- Michel Bergeron Trophy - Offensive Rookie of the Year, Derick Brassard, Drummondville Voltigeurs
- Raymond Lagacé Trophy - Defensive Rookie of the Year, Maxime Joyal, Quebec Remparts
- Frank J. Selke Memorial Trophy - Most sportsmanlike player, David Desharnais, Chicoutimi Saguenéens
- QMJHL Humanitarian of the Year - Humanitarian of the Year, Guillaume Desbiens, Rouyn-Noranda Huskies
- Marcel Robert Trophy - Best Scholastic Player, Guillaume Demers, Cape Breton Screaming Eagles
- Paul Dumont Trophy - Personality of the Year, Sidney Crosby, Rimouski Océanic

Executive

- Ron Lapointe Trophy - Coach of the Year, Richard Martel, Chicoutimi Saguenéens
- John Horman Trophy - Executive of the Year, Eric Verrier, Drummondville Voltigeurs
- Jean Sawyer Trophy - Marketing Director of the Year, Michel Boivin, & Pierre Cardinal, Chicoutimi Saguenéens

== See also ==
- 2005 Memorial Cup
- 2005 NHL entry draft
- 2004–05 OHL season
- 2004–05 WHL season

Preceded by 2003–04 QMJHL season	QMJHL seasons	Succeeded by 2005–06 QMJHL season
