= Baie-Comeau Drakkar =

Junior ice hockey team in Baie-Comeau, Quebec

Baie-Comeau Drakkar Drakkar de Baie-Comeau
- City: Baie-Comeau, Quebec
- League: Quebec Maritimes Junior Hockey League
- Conference: Eastern
- Division: East
- Founded: 1997
- Home arena: Centre Henry-Leonard
- Colours: Red, white and gold
- General manager: Jean-François Grégoire
- Head coach: Jean-François Grégoire
- Website: chl.ca/lhjmq-drakkar/

Current uniform

The Baie-Comeau Drakkar is a Canadian junior ice hockey team in the Quebec Maritimes Junior Hockey League that plays at Centre Henry-Leonard in Baie-Comeau, Quebec. The name "Drakkar" refers to a type of longship.

== History ==
The Drakkar first played in the QMJHL in 1997–98 season. One of the founders of the team was former Quebec Nordique co-founder Marius Fortier.

Baie-Comeau has never won the President's Cup, and only have nine winning seasons in their history. The 2012–13 team had the second-best record during the regular season and reached the league finals for the first time in franchise history, but lost to the Halifax Mooseheads, four games to one.

National Hockey League (NHL) alumni include Marc-André Bergeron, Jean-François Jacques, Yanick Lehoux, Olivier Michaud, Joël Perrault, Patrick Thoresen, Bruno St. Jacques and Gabriel Bourque.

During its 2005–06 season, the team was the subject of the documentary film Junior by the National Film Board of Canada.

== Coaches ==
Notable coaches for the Drakkar include Richard Martel, Mario Pouliot and Éric Veilleux.

== Season-by-season record ==
- Season-by-season record

=== Regular season ===
OL = Overtime loss, SL = Shootout loss, Pct = Winning percentage

| Season | Games | Won | Lost | Tied | OL | SL | Points | Pct | GF | GA | Standing |
|---|---|---|---|---|---|---|---|---|---|---|---|
| 1997–98 | 70 | 18 | 47 | 5 | - | - | 41 | 0.293 | 215 | 332 | 7th, Dilio |
| 1998–99 | 70 | 18 | 44 | 8 | - | - | 44 | 0.314 | 208 | 297 | 7th, Dilio |
| 1999–2000 | 72 | 31 | 31 | 5 | 5 | - | 72 | 0.500 | 257 | 285 | 3rd, East |
| 2000–01 | 72 | 41 | 23 | 8 | 0 | - | 90 | 0.625 | 283 | 255 | 1st, East |
| 2001–02 | 72 | 38 | 25 | 7 | 2 | - | 85 | 0.590 | 288 | 231 | 2nd, East |
| 2002–03 | 72 | 50 | 14 | 6 | 2 | - | 108 | 0.750 | 319 | 213 | 1st, East |
| 2003–04 | 70 | 21 | 42 | 5 | 2 | - | 49 | 0.350 | 195 | 285 | 5th, Eastern |
| 2004–05 | 70 | 24 | 37 | 5 | 4 | - | 57 | 0.407 | 208 | 280 | 5th, Eastern |
| 2005–06 | 70 | 30 | 38 | - | 2 | - | 62 | 0.443 | 249 | 285 | 7th, Western |
| 2006–07 | 70 | 35 | 26 | - | 1 | 8 | 79 | 0.564 | 304 | 285 | 7th, Telus |
| 2007–08 | 70 | 45 | 19 | - | 2 | 4 | 96 | 0.686 | 249 | 210 | 2nd, Telus |
| 2008–09 | 68 | 22 | 37 | - | 7 | 2 | 53 | 0.390 | 206 | 297 | 4th, East |
| 2009–10 | 68 | 21 | 40 | - | 4 | 3 | 49 | 0.360 | 187 | 297 | 4th, East |
| 2010–11 | 68 | 12 | 46 | - | 6 | 4 | 34 | 0.250 | 151 | 266 | 6th, East |
| 2011–12 | 68 | 29 | 34 | - | 1 | 4 | 63 | 0.463 | 217 | 241 | 6th, Telus East |
| 2012–13 | 68 | 44 | 19 | - | 2 | 3 | 93 | 0.684 | 274 | 191 | 1st, Telus East |
| 2013–14 | 68 | 47 | 16 | - | 2 | 3 | 99 | 0.728 | 255 | 170 | 1st, Telus East |
| 2014–15 | 68 | 35 | 25 | - | 5 | 3 | 78 | 0.574 | 227 | 237 | 4th, East |
| 2015–16 | 68 | 14 | 49 | - | 2 | 3 | 33 | 0.260 | 147 | 302 | 6th, East |
| 2016–17 | 68 | 26 | 32 | - | 6 | 4 | 62 | 0.462 | 203 | 230 | 5th, East |
| 2017–18 | 68 | 30 | 33 | - | 4 | 1 | 65 | 0.465 | 224 | 257 | 4th, East |
| 2018–19 | 68 | 49 | 15 | - | 2 | 2 | 102 | 0.750 | 306 | 189 | 2nd, East |
| 2019–20 | 64 | 24 | 29 | - | 7 | 4 | 59 | 0.461 | 196 | 240 | 4th, East |
| 2020–21 | 36 | 8 | 26 | - | 1 | 1 | 18 | 0.250 | 82 | 137 | 6th, East |
| 2021–22 | 68 | 24 | 35 | - | 4 | 5 | 57 | 0.419 | 201 | 247 | 4th, East |
| 2022–23 | 68 | 30 | 32 | - | 4 | 2 | 66 | 0.485 | 205 | 244 | 4th, East |
| 2023–24 | 68 | 53 | 12 | - | 2 | 1 | 109 | 0.801 | 290 | 163 | 1st, East |
| 2024–25 | 64 | 36 | 23 | - | 4 | 1 | 77 | 0.602 | 236 | 186 | 3rd, East |
| 2025–26 | 64 | 15 | 42 | - | 5 | 2 | 37 | 0.289 | 141 | 265 | 10th, Eastern |

== Playoffs ==
| Season | 1st round | 2nd round | 3rd round | Finals |
|---|---|---|---|---|
| 1997–98 | - | - | - | - |
| 1998–99 | - | - | - | - |
| 1999–2000 | L, 2–4, Halifax | - | - | - |
| 2000–01 | Bye | W, 4–1, Rimouski | L, 2–4, Acadie–Bathurst | - |
| 2001–02 | L, 1–4, Cape Breton | - | - | - |
| 2002–03 | Bye | W, 4–1, Quebec | L, 3–4, Halifax | - |
| 2003–04 | L, 0–4, Moncton | - | - | - |
| 2004–05 | L, 2–4, Chicoutimi | - | - | - |
| 2005–06 | L, 0–4, Chicoutimi | - | - | - |
| 2006–07 | W, 4–2, Victoriaville | L, 1–4, Val-d'Or | - | - |
| 2007–08 | L, 1–4, Rimouski | - | - | - |
| 2008–09 | L, 1–4, Quebec | - | - | - |
| 2009–10 | - | - | - | - |
| 2010–11 | - | - | - | - |
| 2011–12 | W, 4–0, Victoriaville | L, 0–4, Saint John | - | - |
| 2012–13 | W, 4–0, Sherbrooke | W, 4–0, Victoriaville | W, 4–2, Blainville-Boisbriand | L, 1–4, Halifax |
| 2013–14 | W, 4–0, Shawinigan | W, 4–0, Rouyn-Noranda | W, 4–3, Blainville-Boisbriand | L, 3–4, Val-d'Or |
| 2014–15 | W, 4–1, Saint John | L, 3–4, Val-d'Or | - | - |
| 2015–16 | - | - | - | - |
| 2016–17 | L, 0–4, Charlottetown | - | - | - |
| 2017–18 | L, 1–4, Halifax | - | - | - |
| 2018–19 | L, 3–4, Moncton | - | - | - |
| 2019–20 | QMJHL playoffs cancelled | | | |
| 2020–21 | L, 0–3, Val-d'Or | - | - | - |
| 2021–22 | L, 1–3, Sherbrooke | - | - | - |
| 2022–23 | L, 3–4, Moncton | - | - | - |
| 2023–24 | W, 4–0, Charlottetown | W, 4–0, Acadie–Bathurst | W, 4–1, Cape Breton | L, 0–4, Drummondville |
| 2024–25 | W, 4–2, Cape Breton | L, 1–4, Moncton | - | - |
| 2025–26 | - | - | - | - |

== Team records ==
The team's all-time leading point scorer is Yanick Lehoux with 164 goals and 218 assists for 382 points; he is also the team's all-time leader in goals and assists. Thierry Douville is the team's all-time penalty minute leader with 1104. Frédéric Gamelin has played the most games in team history with 315.

== Notable players ==
- Marc-André Bergeron
- François Bouchard
- Gabriel Bourque
- Philippe Cadorette
- Marco Charpentier
- Ivan Chekhovich
- Lukáš Cingel
- Jean-François David
- Marc-André Dorion
- Tomáš Filippi
- Gabriel Fortier
- Maxime Fortunus
- Jacob Gaucher
- Félix Girard
- Jérémy Grégoire
- Sacha Guimond
- Charles Hudon
- Bokondji Imama
- Jean-François Jacques
- Joakim Jensen
- Václav Karabáček
- Pierre-Cédric Labrie
- Nathan Légaré
- Yanick Lehoux
- Pierre-Luc Létourneau-Leblond
- Charles Linglet
- Matt Marquardt
- Nicolas Meloche
- Olivier Michaud
- Benoît Mondou
- Pascal Pelletier
- Joël Perrault
- Alexandre Picard-Hooper
- David Savard
- Eliezer Sherbatov
- Bruno St. Jacques
- Edo Terglav
- Patrick Thoresen
- Mathieu Tousignant
- Valentin Zykov
