= Jonathan Bellemare =

Canadian ice hockey player

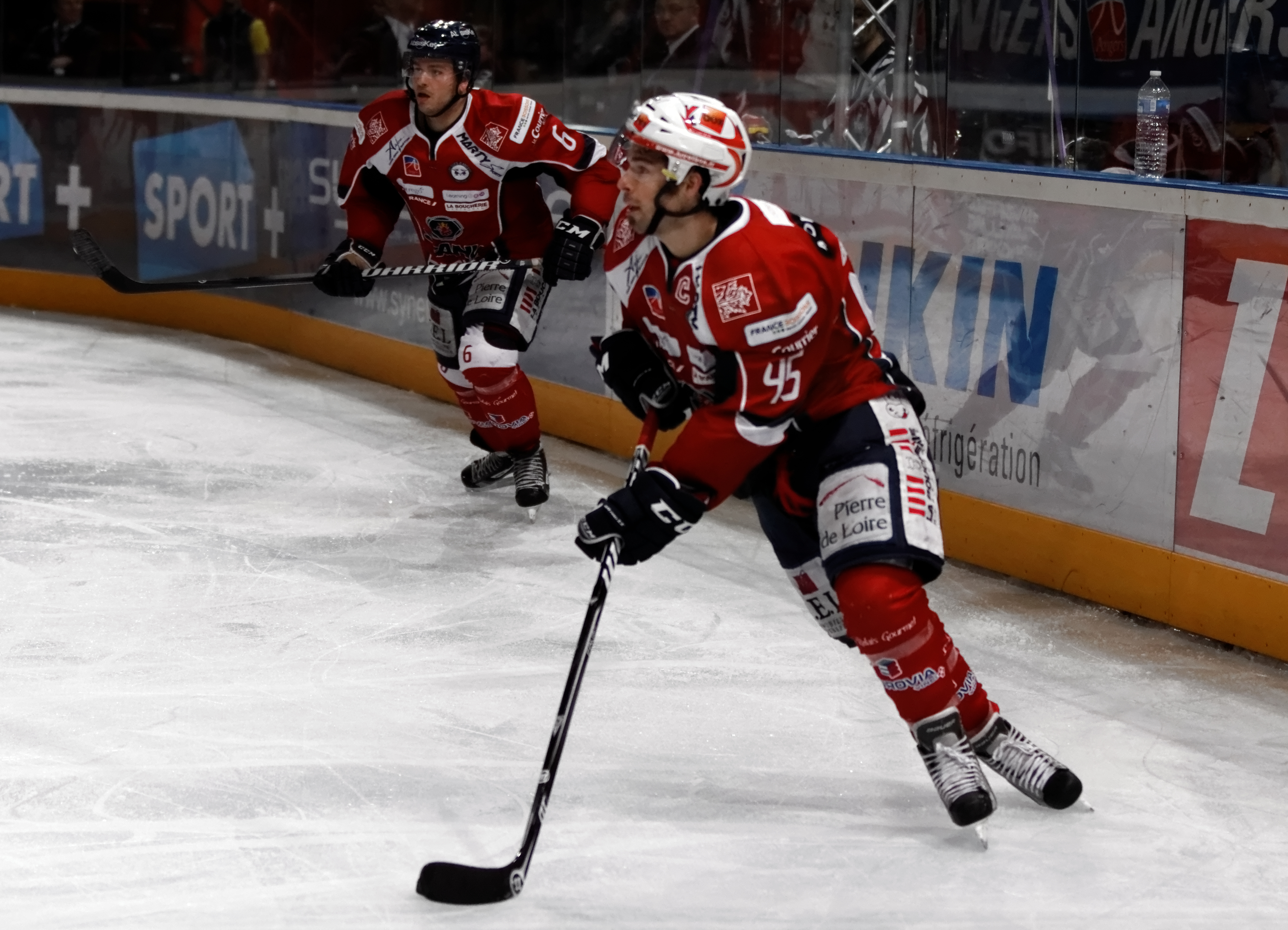
- Bellemare with Angers in 2013
- Born: June 10, 1982 (age 43) Canada
- Height: 5 ft 6 in (168 cm)
- Weight: 160 lb (73 kg; 11 st 6 lb)
- Position: Centre
- Shot: Left
- Played for: ASG Angers; HC Martigny
- NHL draft: Undrafted
- Playing career: 2003–2009

Jonathan Bellemare (born June 10, 1982) is a Canadian former professional ice hockey player. He played the centre position for the ASG Angers in France and HC Martigny of the National League B in Switzerland. Prior to his professional career in Europe, he played with the Shawinigan Cataractes and Hull Olympiques of the Quebec Major Junior Hockey League (QMJHL).
