= Montreal Rocket =

- City: Montreal, Quebec
- League: Q.M.J.H.L.
- Operated: 1999; 27 years ago – 2003; 23 years ago
- Home arena: Maurice Richard Arena
- Colours: Maroon, Navy Blue, Silver, White

Franchise history
- 1999–2003: Montreal Rocket
- 2003–2013: P.E.I. Rocket
- 2013–present: Charlottetown Islanders

The Montreal Rocket were a junior ice hockey team in the Quebec Major Junior Hockey League for four seasons from 1999 to 2003, based out of Montreal, Quebec, Canada. The team was named in honour of Montreal Canadiens great Maurice "Rocket" Richard. The smoke from the rocket in the logo forms the number 9, which was Maurice Richard's jersey number.

In 1999–2000, Daniele Sauvageau became an assistant coach for the Montreal Rocket of the QMJHL. She was the first female coach in QMJHL history. The team played its home games at both the Maurice Richard Arena and the Bell Centre. In 2003, faced with dwindling fan support and massive financial losses, the team relocated to Charlottetown, Prince Edward Island to become the P.E.I. Rocket. In 2013 the name was changed to the Charlottetown Islanders.

== Notable players ==
- Maxim Lapierre
- Ryane Clowe
- Pascal Leclaire
