= Pierre-Luc Sleigher =

Canadian ice hockey player

- Born: February 12, 1982 (age 44) Nouvelle, Quebec, Canada
- Height: 5 ft 9 in (175 cm)
- Weight: 185 lb (84 kg; 13 st 3 lb)
- Position: Centre
- Shot: Right
- Played for: Rapperswil-Jona Lakers; Kassel Huskies; EC VSV; Schwenninger Wild Wings
- NHL draft: Undrafted
- Playing career: 2003–2019

Pierre-Luc Sleigher (born February 12, 1982) is a Canadian former professional ice hockey player. He last played with the Thetford Assurancia in the Ligue Nord-Américaine de Hockey (LNAH).

He has also played for the Atlantic City Boardwalk Bullies, Rapperswil-Jona Lakers, San Diego Gulls, Toledo Storm, and played the 2009-10 season with the Kassel Huskies.
