= Collège Charles-Lemoyne =

Coordinates: 45°30′53″N 73°30′35″W

Information
- School type: Private high school
- Founded: September 4, 1975

The Collège Charles-Lemoyne is a private high school with campuses in Longueuil and in Sainte-Catherine, near Montreal, Quebec, Canada.
