= 2000–01 QMJHL season =

- League: Quebec Major Junior Hockey League
- Sport: Hockey
- Duration: Regular season Sept. 14, 2000 – Mar. 20, 2001; Playoffs; March 23 – May 8, 2001
- Teams: 14

Draft
- Top draft pick: Maxime Daigneault
- Picked by: Val–d'Or Foreurs

Regular season
- Jean Rougeau Trophy: Shawinigan Cataractes (2)
- Season MVP: Simon Gamache (Val–d'Or Foreurs)
- Top scorer: Simon Gamache (Val–d'Or Foreurs)

Playoffs
- Playoffs MVP: Simon Gamache (Foreurs)
- Finals champions: Val-d'Or Foreurs (2)
- Runners-up: Acadie–Bathurst Titan

QMJHL seasons
- 1999–2000 2001–02

2000–01 CHL season
- League: Canadian Hockey League
- Sport: Hockey
- Duration: OHL; Sept. 2000 – Mar. 2001; QMJHL; Sept. 14, 2000 – Mar. 20, 2001; WHL; Sept. 2000 – Mar. 2001
- Teams: 60
- Season MVP: Simon Gamache (Val–d'Or Foreurs) (QMJHL)
- Top scorer: Simon Gamache (Val–d'Or Foreurs) (QMJHL)

Memorial Cup
- Finals champions: Red Deer Rebels (WHL) (1st title)
- Runners-up: Val–d'Or Foreurs (QMJHL)

The 2000–01 QMJHL season was the 32nd season in the history of the Quebec Major Junior Hockey League. Sixteen teams played 72 games each in the schedule. The Shawinigan Cataractes finished first overall in the regular season, winning their second Jean Rougeau Trophy.

Simon Gamache of the Val-d'Or Foreurs is the top scorer in the league, wins the regular season and playoff MVP awards, and three other individual awards at the season's end. Gamache helped Val-d'Or win their second President's Cup, defeating the Acadie-Bathurst Titan in the finals.

== Final standings ==
Note: GP = Games played; W = Wins; L = Losses; T = Ties; OTL = Overtime loss; PTS = Points; GF = Goals for; GA = Goals against

=== Lebel Conference ===
West Division	GP	W	L	T	OTL	Pts	GF	GA
Val-d'Or Foreurs	72	46	17	7	2	101	369	235
Rouyn-Noranda Huskies	72	43	22	5	2	93	318	251
Hull Olympiques	72	34	28	7	3	78	288	284
Montreal Rocket	72	24	35	7	6	61	249	310
Central Division	GP	W	L	T	OTL	Pts	GF	GA
Shawinigan Cataractes	72	54	10	6	2	116	375	192
Victoriaville Tigres	72	45	21	3	3	96	341	269
Drummondville Voltigeurs	72	31	30	5	6	73	246	267
Sherbrooke Castors	72	28	37	4	3	63	245	274

=== Dilio Conference ===
East Division	GP	W	L	T	OTL	Pts	GF	GA
Baie-Comeau Drakkar	72	41	23	8	0	90	283	255
Quebec Remparts	72	22	36	9	5	58	225	303
Chicoutimi Saguenéens	72	22	39	10	1	55	242	313
Rimouski Océanic	72	25	43	2	2	54	268	328
Maritime Division	GP	W	L	T	OTL	Pts	GF	GA
Halifax Mooseheads	72	32	24	10	6	80	235	253
Cape Breton Screaming Eagles	72	30	37	4	1	65	270	292
Acadie-Bathurst Titan	72	29	38	4	1	63	239	281
Moncton Wildcats	72	23	41	6	2	54	246	323

- complete list of standings.

== Scoring leaders ==
Note: GP = Games played; G = Goals; A = Assists; Pts = Points; PIM = Penalty minutes

Player	Team	GP	G	A	Pts	PIM
Simon Gamache	Val-d'Or Foreurs	72	74	110	184	70
Marc-Andre Thinel	Victoriaville Tigres	70	62	88	150	101
Dominic Forget	Shawinigan Cataractes	71	47	94	141	78
Yanick Lehoux	Baie-Comeau Drakkar	70	67	68	135	62
Brandon Reid	Val-d'Or Foreurs	57	45	81	126	18
Radim Vrbata	Shawinigan Cataractes	55	56	64	120	18
Antoine Vermette	Victoriaville Tigres	71	57	62	119	102
Sebastien Thinel	Victoriaville Tigres	72	45	73	118	84
Stephane Veilleux	Val-d'Or Foreurs	68	48	67	115	90
Jason Pominville	Shawinigan Cataractes	71	46	67	113	24

- complete scoring statistics

== Leading goaltenders ==
Note: GP = Games played; Min = Minutes played; W = Wins; L = Losses; T = Ties; GA = Goals against; SO = Total shutouts; SV% = Save percentage; GAA = Goals against average

Player	Team	GP	Min	W	L	T	GA	SO	SV%	GAA
Frédéric Cloutier	Shawinigan Cataractes	58	3270	42	6	2	136	6	.901	2.50
Maxime Ouellet	Rouyn-Noranda Huskies	25	1471	18	5	1	65	3	.913	2.65
Scott Gouthro	Cape Breton Screaming Eagles	3	183	2	1	0	9	0	.899	2.94
Olivier Michaud	Shawinigan Cataractes	21	1096	12	4	0	54	1	.882	2.95
Dany Dallaire	Montreal/Halifax	32	1824	17	8	1	92	0	.907	3.02

== Playoffs ==
Simon Gamache was the leading scorer of the playoffs with 57 points (22 goals, 35 assists), setting the QMJHL playoff points record.

Conference Quarterfinals
L4	Rouyn-Noranda	4
L5	Hull	1
L2	Val-d'Or	4
L7	Sherbrooke	0
L3	Victoriaville	4
L6	Drummondville	2
D2	Halifax	2
D7	Rimouski	4
D3	Cape Breton	4
D6	Chicoutimi	3
D4	Acadie-Bathurst	4
D5	Quebec	0

Conference Semifinals
L1	Shawinigan	4
L4	Rouyn-Noranda	0
L2	Val-d'Or	4
L3	Victoriaville	3
D1	Baie-Comeau	4
D7	Rimouski	1
D3	Cape Breton	1
D4	Acadie-Bathurst	4

Conference Finals
L1	Shawinigan	2
L2	Val-d'Or	4
D1	Baie-Comeau	2
D4	Acadie-Bathurst	4

President's Cup Final
L2	Val-d'Or	4
D4	Acadie-Bathurst	0

=== Conference Quarterfinals ===
==== (L4) Rouyn-Noranda Huskies vs. (L5) Hull Olympiques ====
March 23	Rouyn-Noranda Huskies	2 – 1	Hull Olympiques	Aréna Dave Keon
7:06 - Jérôme Marois (1); 19:47 - Alexandre Giroux (1)		First period	Aleš Hemský (1) - 8:40
No scoring		Second period	No scoring
No scoring		Third period	No scoring
Maxime Ouellet (33 saves / 34 shots)		Goalie stats	Éric Lafrance (22 saves / 24 shots)

March 24	Rouyn-Noranda Huskies	5 – 3	Hull Olympiques	Aréna Dave Keon

March 27	Hull Olympiques	2 – 8	Rouyn-Noranda Huskies	Centre Robert Guertin

March 28	Hull Olympiques	3 – 1	Rouyn-Noranda Huskies	Centre Robert Guertin

March 30	Rouyn-Noranda Huskies	6 – 4	Hull Olympiques	Aréna Dave Keon

Rouyn-Noranda wins series 4 – 1

==== (L2) Val-d'Or Foreurs vs. (L7) Sherbrooke Castors ====
March 23	Val-d'Or Foreurs	4 – 2	Sherbrooke Castors	Palais des Sports
12:05 - pp - Brandon Reid (1); 19:08 - Chris Lyness (1)		First period	Simon Tremblay (1) - pp - 4:28
10:53 - pp - Brandon Reid (2)		Second period	No scoring
19:33 - sh - en - Stéphane Veilleux (1)		Third period	Nicolas Corbeil (1) - pp - 18:50
Simon Lajeunesse (41 saves / 43 shots)		Goalie stats	Drew MacIntyre (32 saves / 35 shots)

March 24	Val-d'Or Foreurs	5 – 3	Sherbrooke Castors	Palais des Sports
8:31 - pp - Stéphane Veilleux (2); 12:17 - Thomas Psenka (1)		First period	Francis Trudel (1) - pp - 2:21
No scoring		Second period	François Bélanger (1) - pp - 19:34
1:02 - pp - Chris Lyness (2); 18:52 - Simon Gamache (1); 19:14 - en - Stéphane Veilleux (3)		Third period	Simon Tremblay (2) - 14:18
Simon Lajeunesse (31 saves / 34 shots)		Goalie stats	Drew MacIntyre (31 saves / 35 shots)

March 27	Sherbrooke Castors	3 – 6	Val-d'Or Foreurs	Palais des Sports Léopold-Drolet
14:26 - Benoit Genesse (1); 17:21 - pp - Sandro Sbrocca (1)		First period	Stéphane Veilleux (4) - pp - 11:25; Jérôme Bergeron (1) - 12:15; Hugo Lévesque (1) - 18:22
No scoring		Second period	No scoring
15:37 - pp - Steve Morency (1)		Third period	Brandon Reid (3) - pp - 0:58; Éric Fortier (1) - pp - 11:04; Sénèque Hyacinthe (1) - pp - 13:32
Drew MacIntyre (47 saves / 53 shots)		Goalie stats	Simon Lajeunesse (22 saves / 25 shots)

March 29	Sherbrooke Castors	5 – 6	OT	Val-d'Or Foreurs	Palais des Sports Léopold-Drolet
2:48 - Benoit Genesse (2); 2:59 - Bertrand-Pierre Plouffe (1)		First period		Chris Lyness (3) - 2:25
2:17 - Jeremy Knight (1); 11:41 - Sébastien Courcelles (1); 12:35 - pp - Sandro Sbrocca (2)		Second period		No scoring
No scoring		Third period		Simon Gamache (2) - 0:30; Brandon Reid (4) - 5:16; Stéphane Veilleux (5) - sh - 6:34; Stéphane Veilleux (6) - 9:30
No scoring		First overtime period		Sénèque Hyacinthe (2) - 0:13
Drew MacIntyre (31 saves / 37 shots)		Goalie stats		Simon Lajeunesse (16 saves / 20 shots); Maxime Daigneault (8 saves / 9 shots)

Val-d'Or wins series 4 – 0

==== (L3) Victoriaville Tigres vs. (L6) Drummondville Voltigeurs ====
March 23	Victoriaville Tigres	1 – 4	Drummondville Voltigeurs	Colisée des Bois-Francs

March 24	Victoriaville Tigres	2 – 3	OT	Drummondville Voltigeurs	Colisée des Bois-Francs

March 27	Drummondville Voltigeurs	3 – 5	Victoriaville Tigres	Centre Marcel Dionne

March 28	Drummondville Voltigeurs	2 – 5	Victoriaville Tigres	Centre Marcel Dionne

March 30	Victoriaville Tigres	7 – 2	Drummondville Voltigeurs	Colisée des Bois-Francs

April 1	Drummondville Voltigeurs	6 – 8	Victoriaville Tigres	Centre Marcel Dionne

Victoriaville wins series 4 – 2

==== (D2) Halifax Mooseheads vs. (D7) Rimouski Océanic ====
March 23	Halifax Mooseheads	3 – 2	Rimouski Océanic	Halifax Metro Centre

March 24	Halifax Mooseheads	4 – 3	Rimouski Océanic	Halifax Metro Centre

March 27	Rimouski Océanic	3 – 2	Halifax Mooseheads	Colisée de Rimouski

March 28	Rimouski Océanic	6 – 4	Halifax Mooseheads	Colisée de Rimouski

March 30	Halifax Mooseheads	4 – 8	Rimouski Océanic	Halifax Metro Centre

April 1	Rimouski Océanic	4 – 1	Halifax Mooseheads	Colisée de Rimouski

Rimouski wins series 4 – 2

==== (D3) Cape Breton Screaming Eagles vs. (D6) Chicoutimi Saguenéens ====
March 23	Cape Breton Screaming Eagles	2 – 3	Chicoutimi Saguenéens	Centre 200
No scoring		First period	Christian Larrivée (1) - 2:56; Pierre-Marc Bouchard (1) - pp - 10:56
8:12 - Robert Horák (1); 14:22 - pp - Mathieu Dumas (1)		Second period	Éric Bétournay (1) - 2:32
No scoring		Third period	No scoring
Marc-André Fleury (12 saves / 15 shots); Daniel Boisclair (26 saves / 26 shots)		Goalie stats	Dave Verville (27 saves / 29 shots)

March 24	Cape Breton Screaming Eagles	4 – 5	Chicoutimi Saguenéens	Centre 200
1:32 - Vladimir Artushin (1); 3:21 - Pascal Morency (1)		First period	Éric Bétournay (2) - pp - 5:21; David Beaudry (1) - 13:51; P. A. Parenteau (1) - 17:35
14:44 - Pierre-Luc Laprise (1); 19:25 - Stuart MacRae (1)		Second period	Pierre-Marc Bouchard (2) - 6:19; P. A. Parenteau (2) - 8:31
No scoring		Third period	No scoring
Daniel Boisclair (28 saves / 33 shots)		Goalie stats	Dave Verville (34 saves / 38 shots)

March 27	Chicoutimi Saguenéens	7 – 1	Cape Breton Screaming Eagles	Centre Georges-Vézina
4:01 - pp - Pierre-Marc Bouchard (3)		First period	Dominic Noël (1) - sh - 1:57
2:21 - Sylvain Plamondon (1); 9:31 - pp - Stanislav Hudec (1); 17:57 - Pierre-Marc Bouchard (4)		Second period	No scoring
7:19 - pp - Éric Bétournay (3); 10:19 - P. A. Parenteau (3); 17:09 - pp - Bruno Champagne (1)		Third period	No scoring
Dave Verville (21 saves / 22 shots)		Goalie stats	Daniel Boisclair (28 saves / 34 shots); Marc-André Fleury (5 saves / 6 shots)

March 28	Chicoutimi Saguenéens	2 – 3	Cape Breton Screaming Eagles	Centre Georges-Vézina
No scoring		First period	No scoring
0:32 - pp - Christian Larrivée (2); 10:29 - P. A. Parenteau (4)		Second period	Stuart MacRae (2) - 13:28
No scoring		Third period	Stuart MacRae (3) - 12:37; Charles Gauthier (1) - 13:00
Dave Verville (25 saves / 28 shots)		Goalie stats	Daniel Boisclair (35 saves / 37 shots)

March 30	Cape Breton Screaming Eagles	4 – 1	Chicoutimi Saguenéens	Centre 200
12:59 - Olivier Proulx (1)		First period	No scoring
12:33 - André Martineau (1)		Second period	No scoring
9:10 - Maxime Lessard (1); 19:04 - en - Pierre-Luc Laprise (2)		Third period	Éric Dufour (1) - 5:18
Daniel Boisclair (28 saves / 29 shots)		Goalie stats	Dave Verville (34 saves / 37 shots)

April 1	Chicoutimi Saguenéens	2 – 4	Cape Breton Screaming Eagles	Centre Georges-Vézina
No scoring		First period	No scoring
9:06 - pp - Christian Larrivée (3); 12:28 - Pierre-Marc Bouchard (5)		Second period	Dominic Noël (2) - 4:38
No scoring		Third period	Charles Gauthier (2) - 6:02; Olivier Proulx (2) - 11:16; Pierre-Luc Laprise (3) - en - 19:09
Dave Verville (21 saves / 24 shots)		Goalie stats	Daniel Boisclair (31 saves / 33 shots)

April 3	Cape Breton Screaming Eagles	6 – 1	Chicoutimi Saguenéens	Centre 200
3:08 - Maxime Lessard (2); 6:48 - pp - Dominic Noël (3); 9:17 - sh - Dominic Noël (4); 14:43 - Olivier Proulx (3)		First period	David Beaudry (2) - 13:30
0:35 - André Martineau (2); 15:41 - Ryan Flinn (1)		Second period
No scoring		Third period	No scoring
Daniel Boisclair (38 saves / 39 shots)		Goalie stats	Dave Verville (26 saves / 32 shots)

Cape Breton wins series 4 – 3

==== (D4) Acadie-Bathurst Titan vs. (D5) Quebec Remparts ====
March 23	Acadie-Bathurst Titan	4 – 0	Quebec Remparts	K. C. Irving Regional Centre
3:32 - Darrell Jerrett (1); 10:54 - pp - Alex Matieroukhine (1)		First period	No scoring
No scoring		Second period	No scoring
0:21 - Mirko Murovic (1); 16:59 - Karl Fournier (1)		Third period	No scoring
Adam Russo (16 saves / 16 shots)		Goalie stats	Kevin Lachance (45 saves / 48 shots); Scott Della Vedova (6 saves / 7 shots)

March 24	Acadie-Bathurst Titan	4 – 3	2OT	Quebec Remparts	K. C. Irving Regional Centre
15:03 - pp - Alex Matieroukhine (2); 16:12 - Karl Fournier (2)		First period		David Massé (1) - pp - 8:34
No scoring		Second period		Mike Bray (1) - 1:09; Guillaume Bérubé (1) - 4:37
1:13 - Olivier Fillion (1)		Third period		No scoring
11:13 - Karl Fournier (3)		Second overtime period		No scoring
Adam Russo (31 saves / 34 shots)		Goalie stats		Kevin Lachance (58 saves / 62 shots)

March 26	Quebec Remparts	0 – 5	Acadie-Bathurst Titan	Colisée Pepsi
No scoring		First period	No scoring
No scoring		Second period	Samuel Séguin (1) - pp - 1:56; Alex Matieroukhine (3) - pp - 5:31; Yann Joseph (1) - pp - 9:56
No scoring		Third period	Antoine Bergeron (1) - pp - 15:08; Alex Matieroukhine (4) - pp - 16:51
Kevin Lachance (28 saves / 33 shots)		Goalie stats	Adam Russo (24 saves / 24 shots)

March 28	Quebec Remparts	1 – 3	Acadie-Bathurst Titan	Colisée Pepsi
No scoring		First period	No scoring
12:16 - pp - Petr Přeučil (1)		Second period	Darrell Jerrett (2) - 15:57
No scoring		Third period	Mirko Murovic (2) - 9:49; Alex Matieroukhine (5) - pp - 14:41
Kevin Lachance (38 saves / 41 shots)		Goalie stats	Adam Russo (20 saves / 21 shots)

Acadie-Bathurst wins series 4 – 0

=== Conference Semifinals ===
==== (L1) Shawinigan Cataractes vs. (L4) Rouyn-Noranda Huskies ====
April 6	Shawinigan Cataractes	4 – 0	Rouyn-Noranda Huskies	Aréna Jacques Plante

April 7	Shawinigan Cataractes	4 – 2	Rouyn-Noranda Huskies	Aréna Jacques Plante

April 10	Rouyn-Noranda Huskies	1 – 4	Shawinigan Cataractes	Aréna Dave Keon

April 11	Rouyn-Noranda Huskies	3 – 4	OT	Shawinigan Cataractes	Aréna Dave Keon

Shawinigan wins series 4 – 0

==== (L2) Val-d'Or Foreurs vs. (L3) Victoriaville Tigres ====
April 6	Val-d'Or Foreurs	2 – 6	Victoriaville Tigres	Palais des Sports
13:14 - pp - Simon Gamache (3)		First period	Sébastien Thinel (2) - pp - 16:07; Martin Grenier (2) - pp - 19:42
10:42 - pp - Simon Gamache (4)		Second period	Martin Autotte (4) - 11:15; Antoine Vermette (1) - 13:01
No scoring		Third period	Marc-André Thinel (5) - 3:28; Carl Mallette (5) - pp - 16:41
Simon Lajeunesse (28 saves / 34 shots)		Goalie stats	Jean-François Nogues (42 saves / 44 shots)

April 7	Val-d'Or Foreurs	3 – 5	Victoriaville Tigres	Palais des Sports
No scoring		First period	Pierre-Luc Sleigher (1) - sh - 3:01
7:33 - Mathieu Bastien (1); 14:23 - pp - Stéphane Veilleux (7)		Second period	No scoring
9:36 - Jérôme Bergeron (2)		Third period	Carl Mallette (6) - 2:39; Marc-André Thinel (6) - pp - 5:41; Antoine Vermette (2) - sh - 8:46; Marc-André Thinel (7) - en - 19:50
Simon Lajeunesse (25 saves / 29 shots)		Goalie stats	Jean-François Nogues (33 saves / 36 shots)

April 10	Victoriaville Tigres	3 – 8	Val-d'Or Foreurs	Colisée des Bois-Francs
No scoring		First period	Jérôme Bergeron (3) - 1:33; Sénèque Hyacinthe (3) - 2:15; Stéphane Veilleux (8) - pp - 5:13; Simon Gamache (5) - pp - 8:16; Simon Gamache (6) - pp - 16:44; Simon Gamache (7) - 18:19
0:21 - pp - Carl Mallette (7); 1:09 - Carl Mallette (8); 9:56 - pp - Marc-André Thinel (8)		Second period	No scoring
No scoring		Third period	Alexandre Turcotte (1) - 6:55; Brandon Reid (5) - 15:38
Jean-François Nogues (8 saves / 11 shots); Frédéric Malette (19 saves / 24 shots)		Goalie stats	Simon Lajeunesse (38 saves / 41 shots)

April 11	Victoriaville Tigres	2 – 5	Val-d'Or Foreurs	Colisée des Bois-Francs
No scoring		First period	Éric Fortier (2) - 2:02; Kory Baker (1) - 9:57
10:52 - Antoine Vermette (3)		Second period	Alexandre Turcotte (2) - 13:36; Simon Gamache (8) - pp - 16:34
18:54 - pp - Carl Mallette (9)		Third period	Brandon Reid (6) - 4:59
Jean-François Nogues (26 saves / 31 shots)		Goalie stats	Simon Lajeunesse (30 saves / 32 shots)

April 13	Val-d'Or Foreurs	6 – 3	Victoriaville Tigres	Palais des Sports
8:19 - pp - Sénèque Hyacinthe (4)		First period	Sébastien Thinel (3) - 9:47
9:39 - Nicolas Pelletier (1)		Second period	Danny Groulx (2) - 0:34
3:49 - pp - Sénèque Hyacinthe (5); 10:44 - Mathieu Bastien (2); 14:07 - Nicolas Pelletier (2); 19:23 - Stéphane Veilleux (9)		Third period	Mathieu Brunelle (1) - 5:11
Simon Lajeunesse (20 saves / 23 shots)		Goalie stats	Jean-François Nogues (38 saves / 44 shots)

April 15	Victoriaville Tigres	8 – 5	Val-d'Or Foreurs	Colisée des Bois-Francs
No scoring		First period	Chris Lyness (4) - 8:36; Brandon Reid (7) - 9:07
4:25 - pp - Johnny Oduya (3); 6:56 - sh - Marc-André Thinel (9); 8:56 - pp - Antoine Vermette (4); 16:38 - pp - Marc-André Thinel (10); 17:11 - Matthew Lombardi (10)		Second period	No scoring
9:52 - Sébastien Thinel (4); 15:41 - Johnny Oduya (4); 19:25 - en - Marc-André Thinel (11)		Third period	Chris Lyness (5) - 3:19; Sénèque Hyacinthe (6) - pp - 13:06; Brandon Reid (8) - 15:03
Jean-François Nogues (22 saves / 24 shots); Frédéric Malette (17 saves / 20 shots)		Goalie stats	Simon Lajeunesse (42 saves / 49 shots); Maxime Daigneault (0 saves / 0 shots)

April 17	Val-d'Or Foreurs	7 – 5	Victoriaville Tigres	Palais des Sports
1:27 - David Cloutier (1); 10:47 - pp - Simon Gamache (9)		First period	No scoring
1:09 - Éric Fortier (3); 7:09 - Brandon Reid (9); 10:55 - Simon Gamache (10); 17:20 - Nicolas Pelletier (3)		Second period	Matthew Lombardi (11) - 3:43; Matthew Lombardi (12) - pp - 9:58; Carl Mallette (10) - 19:59
3:17 - Éric Fortier (4)		Third period	Marc-André Thinel (12) - 9:14; Patrick Vincent (2) - pp - 17:21
Simon Lajeunesse (33 saves / 38 shots)		Goalie stats	Frédéric Malette (39 saves / 46 shots)

Val-d'Or wins series 4 – 3

==== (D1) Baie-Comeau Drakkar vs. (D7) Rimouski Océanic ====
April 6	Baie-Comeau Drakkar	8 – 2	Rimouski Océanic	Centre Henry-Leonard

April 7	Baie-Comeau Drakkar	3 – 4	Rimouski Océanic	Centre Henry-Leonard

April 10	Rimouski Océanic	4 – 5	Baie-Comeau Drakkar	Colisée de Rimouski

April 11	Rimouski Océanic	1 – 4	Baie-Comeau Drakkar	Colisée de Rimouski

March 30	Baie-Comeau Drakkar	7 – 0	Rimouski Océanic	Centre Henry-Leonard

Baie-Comeau wins series 4 – 1

==== (D1) Cape Breton Screaming Eagles vs. (D4) Acadie-Bathurst Titan ====
April 6	Cape Breton Screaming Eagles	0 – 4	Acadie-Bathurst Titan	Centre 200
No scoring		First period	Samuel Séguin (2) - 11:21; Simon Laliberté (1) - pp - 13:24
No scoring		Second period	Olivier Fillion (2) - 11:47; Karl Fournier (4) - 19:14
No scoring		Third period	No scoring
Daniel Boisclair (23 saves / 27 shots)		Goalie stats	Adam Russo (17 saves / 17 shots)

April 7	Cape Breton Screaming Eagles	4 – 1	Acadie-Bathurst Titan	Centre 200
No scoring		First period	No scoring
18:43 - Dominic Noël (5)		Second period	No scoring
10:33 - Olivier Proulx (4); 16:31 - Stuart MacRae (4); 17:39 - Dominic Noël (6)		Third period	Samuel Séguin (3) - 4:11
Daniel Boisclair (37 saves / 38 shots)		Goalie stats	Adam Russo (22 saves / 26 shots)

April 10	Acadie-Bathurst Titan	5 – 2	Cape Breton Screaming Eagles	K. C. Irving Regional Centre
8:25 - pp - Simon Laliberté (2)		First period	Dominic Noël (7) - 6:46
2:23 - Yann Joseph (2); 11:09 - Michael Lanthier (1)		Second period	Dustin Russell (1) - pp - 10:30
0:46 - Mirko Murovic (3); 1:19 - Yann Joseph (3)		Third period	No scoring
Adam Russo (27 saves / 29 shots)		Goalie stats	Daniel Boisclair (23 saves / 28 shots)

April 11	Acadie-Bathurst Titan	4 – 3	Cape Breton Screaming Eagles	K. C. Irving Regional Centre
No scoring		First period	No scoring
6:46 - pp - Miroslav Durak (1); 8:06 - Éric Cloutier (1); 13:11 - pp - Mirko Murovic (4); 17:51 - Karl Fournier (5)		Second period	Stuart MacRae (5) - 11:38
No scoring		Third period	Stuart MacRae (6) - pp - 6:52; Dominic Noël (8) - 9:04
Adam Russo (22 saves / 25 shots)		Goalie stats	Daniel Boisclair (27 saves / 31 shots)

March 30	Cape Breton Screaming Eagles	3 – 6	Acadie-Bathurst Titan	Centre 200
15:56 - Dominic Noël (9)		First period	Éric Cloutier (2) - 8:40; Éric Cloutier (3) - 14:28
1:40 - Dustin Russell (2)		Second period	Alex Matieroukhine (6) - pp - 9:35; Mirko Murovic (5) - pp - 16:07
8:03 - André Martineau (3)		Third period	Olivier Fillion (3) - 1:52; Alex Matieroukhine (7) - en - 19:04
Daniel Boisclair (20 saves / 25 shots)		Goalie stats	Adam Russo (25 saves / 28 shots)

Acadie-Bathurst wins series 4 – 1

=== Conference Finals ===
==== (L1) Shawinigan Cataractes vs. (L2) Val-d'Or Foreurs ====
April 20	Shawinigan Cataractes	4 – 5	Val-d'Or Foreurs	Aréna Jacques Plante
No scoring		First period	No scoring
18:25 - Jason Pominville (3)		Second period	Alexandre Turcotte (3) - 9:08; Sénèque Hyacinthe (7) - 10:42; Chris Lyness (6) - pp - 16:24; Jérôme Bergeron (4) - 17:01
3:08 - Jason Pominville (4); 12:57 - pp - Jean-François David (1); 15:57 - pp - Jean-François Dufort (1)		Third period	Simon Gamache (11) - 7:07
Frédéric Cloutier (21 saves / 26 shots)		Goalie stats	Simon Lajeunesse (41 saves / 45 shots)

April 21	Shawinigan Cataractes	4 – 3	OT	Val-d'Or Foreurs	Aréna Jacques Plante
5:23 - pp - Jean-François David (2); 7:51 - pp - Anthony Quessy (2); 12:31 - Anthony Quessy (3)		First period		Stéphane Veilleux (10) - 0:45; Éric Fortier (5) - 2:37; Brandon Reid (10) - pp - 17:39
No scoring		Second period		No scoring
No scoring		Third period		No scoring
7:17 - Radim Vrbata (2)		First overtime period		No scoring
Frédéric Cloutier (1 save / 3 shots); Olivier Michaud (27 saves / 28 shots)		Goalie stats		Simon Lajeunesse (28 saves / 32 shots)

April 24	Val-d'Or Foreurs	5 – 4	Shawinigan Cataractes	Palais des Sports
No scoring		First period	Anthony Quessy (4) - pp - 4:00; Marc-André Bergeron (3) - pp - 6:40
0:26 - pp - Stéphane Veilleux (11); 2:03 - pp - Stéphane Veilleux (12); 10:51 - David Cloutier (2); 13:09 - sh - Alexandre Rouleau (1)		Second period	No scoring
5:51 - pp - Stéphane Veilleux (13)		Third period	Jonathan Bellemare (3) - pp - 13:57; Jason Pominville (5) - 19:17
Simon Lajeunesse (3 saves / 5 shots); Maxime Daigneault (34 saves / 36 shots)		Goalie stats	Frédéric Cloutier (8 saves / 12 shots); Olivier Michaud (9 saves / 10 shots)

April 25	Val-d'Or Foreurs	5 – 3	Shawinigan Cataractes	Palais des Sports
17:51 - pp - Chris Lyness (7)		First period	Marc-André Bergeron (4) - pp - 18:56
18:17 - Kory Baker (2)		Second period	Radim Vrbata (3) - 16:45
3:04 - Nicolas Pelletier (4); 10:29 - Nicolas Pelletier (5); 19:12 - en - Éric Fortier (6)		Third period	Yannick Noiseux (1) - 8:50
Maxime Daigneault (27 saves / 30 shots)		Goalie stats	Olivier Michaud (26 saves / 30 shots)

April 27	Shawinigan Cataractes	4 – 3	Val-d'Or Foreurs	Aréna Jacques Plante
12:58 - sh - Radim Vrbata (4)		First period	Kory Baker (3) - pp - 2:39; Simon Gamache (12) - pp - 3:35
0:28 - pp - Jean-François Dufort (2)		Second period	No scoring
1:47 - pp - Jean-François Dufort (3); 9:04 - Yannick Noiseux (2)		Third period	Simon Gamache (13) - 10:26
Frédéric Cloutier (41 saves / 44 shots)		Goalie stats	Maxime Daigneault (32 saves / 36 shots)

April 29	Val-d'Or Foreurs	4 – 1	Shawinigan Cataractes	Palais des Sports
5:50 - pp - Brandon Reid (11); 7:37 - pp - Simon Gamache (14)		First period	No scoring
0:15 - Sénèque Hyacinthe (8); 14:15 - sh - Jérôme Bergeron (5)		Second period	Jason Pominville (6) - 16:36
No scoring		Third period	No scoring
Maxime Daigneault (24 saves / 25 shots)		Goalie stats	Frédéric Cloutier (30 saves / 34 shots)

Val-d'Or wins series 4 – 2

==== (D1) Baie-Comeau Drakkar vs. (D4) Acadie-Bathurst Titan ====
April 20	Baie-Comeau Drakkar	2 – 3	Acadie-Bathurst Titan	Centre Henry-Leonard
No scoring		First period	Miroslav Durak (2) - 17:48
10:48 - pp - Yanick Lehoux (2); 16:12 - sh - Marco Charpentier (7)		Second period	Éric Cloutier (4) - 1:41
No scoring		Third period	No scoring
David St-Germain (28 saves / 31 shots)		Goalie stats	Adam Russo (27 saves / 29 shots)

April 21	Baie-Comeau Drakkar	3 – 2	3OT	Acadie-Bathurst Titan	Centre Henry-Leonard
No scoring		First period		Antoine Bergeron (2) - pp - 7:35; Simon Laliberté (3) - pp - 9:57
0:23 - pp - Marco Charpentier (8)		Second period		No scoring
14:09 - Yanick Lehoux (3)		Third period		No scoring
6:37 - sh - Yanick Lehoux (4)		Third overtime period		No scoring
David St-Germain (35 saves / 37 shots)		Goalie stats		Adam Russo (44 saves / 47 shots)

April 24	Acadie-Bathurst Titan	3 – 2	Baie-Comeau Drakkar	K. C. Irving Regional Centre
No scoring		First period	Marco Charpentier (9) - pp - 6:11
11:46 - Miroslav Durak (3); 19:10 - pp - Simon Laliberté (4)		Second period	Robin Leblanc (5) - pp - 9:23
14:40 - Samuel Séguin (4)		Third period	No scoring
Adam Russo (22 saves / 24 shots)		Goalie stats	David St-Germain (20 saves / 23 shots)

April 25	Acadie-Bathurst Titan	6 – 5	Baie-Comeau Drakkar	K. C. Irving Regional Centre
3:31 - Karl Fournier (6); 7:54 - Simon Laliberté (5); 13:26 - sh - Yann Joseph (4)		First period	Yanick Lehoux (5) - sh - 11:19; Duilio Grande (2) - 12:16; Robin Leblanc (6) - pp - 19:21
3:40 - pp - Antoine Bergeron (3)		Second period	Robin Leblanc (7) - 4:07; Charles Linglet (2) - pp - 7:41
11:11 - Mirko Murovic (6); 19:56 - Mirko Murovic (7)		Third period	No scoring
Adam Russo (5 saves / 9 shots); Jean-François Laniel (10 saves / 11 shots)		Goalie stats	David St-Germain (3 saves / 6 shots); Ghyslain Rousseau (34 saves / 37 shots)

April 27	Baie-Comeau Drakkar	4 – 3	Acadie-Bathurst Titan	Centre Henry-Leonard
3:00 - Yanick Lehoux (6)		First period	No scoring
4:37 - sh - Jonathan Gautier (3); 11:48 - Yanick Lehoux (7)		Second period	Patrick Mbaraga (1) - 15:00; Éric Cloutier (6) - sh - 19:13
15:27 - Yanick Lehoux (8)		Third period	Alex Matieroukhine (8) - 8:21
David St-Germain (28 saves / 31 shots)		Goalie stats	Adam Russo (27 saves / 31 shots)

April 29	Acadie-Bathurst Titan	4 – 2	Baie-Comeau Drakkar	K. C. Irving Regional Centre
7:01 - pp - Miroslav Durak (4)		First period	Dominic Périard (2) - pp - 10:20
2:37 - pp - Mirko Murovic (8); 6:52 - Alex Matieroukhine (9)		Second period	Jean Morin Jr. (4) - 8:06
1:54 - Alex Matieroukhine (10)		Third period	No scoring
Adam Russo (22 saves / 24 shots)		Goalie stats	David St-Germain (25 saves / 29 shots)

Acadie-Bathurst wins series 4 – 2

=== President's Cup Final ===
==== (L2) Val-d'Or Foreurs vs. (L4) Acadie-Bathurst Titan ====
May 3	Val-d'Or Foreurs	6 – 4	Acadie-Bathurst Titan	Palais des Sports
10:58 - pp - Stéphane Veilleux (14); 14:33 - pp - Simon Gamache (15)		First period	Yann Joseph (5) - 16:04
2:38 - Simon Gamache (16); 5:58 - David Cloutier (3); 17:21 - pp - Stéphane Veilleux (15)		Second period	Samuel Séguin (5) - pp - 14:02; Mirko Murovic (9) - pp - 19:09
0:34 - Jérôme Bergeron (6)		Third period	Antoine Bergeron (4) - 7:06
Maxime Daigneault (20 saves / 24 shots)		Goalie stats	Adam Russo (9 saves / 13 shots); Jean-François Laniel (14 saves / 16 shots)

May 4	Val-d'Or Foreurs	7 – 2	Acadie-Bathurst Titan	Palais des Sports
1:48 - Jérôme Bergeron (7); 6:05 - Nicolas Pelletier (6); 10:02 - pp - Simon Gamache (17); 19:55 - pp - Simon Gamache (18)		First period	Antoine Bergeron (5) - pp - 12:33
5:01 - pp - Sénèque Hyacinthe (9)		Second period	Antoine Bergeron (6) - pp - 4:06
6:27 - pp - Sénèque Hyacinthe (10); 11:07 - Simon Gamache (19)		Third period	No scoring
Maxime Daigneault (35 saves / 37 shots)		Goalie stats	Adam Russo (2 saves / 5 shots); Jean-François Laniel (14 saves / 18 shots)

May 7	Acadie-Bathurst Titan	2 – 4	Val-d'Or Foreurs	K. C. Irving Regional Centre
No scoring		First period	Simon Gamache (20) - pp - 3:39; Nicolas Pelletier (7) - 10:36; Brandon Reid (12) - 13:44
15:17 - Michaël Tessier (1)		Second period	Simon Gamache (21) - pp - 6:02
4:57 - Alexandre Vigneault (1)		Third period	No scoring
Jean-François Laniel (4 saves / 7 shots); Adam Russo (20 saves / 21 shots)		Goalie stats	Maxime Daigneault (27 saves / 29 shots)

May 8	Acadie-Bathurst Titan	2 – 4	Val-d'Or Foreurs	K. C. Irving Regional Centre
No scoring		First period	Brandon Reid (13) - 2:57; Simon Gamache (22) - pp - 11:58
No scoring		Second period	Éric Fortier (7) - 19:46
6:39 - pp - Tyler Reid (1); 8:59 - Alex Matieroukhine (11)		Third period	Hugo Lévesque (2) - 0:36
Adam Russo (21 saves / 25 shots)		Goalie stats	Maxime Daigneault (30 saves / 32 shots)

Val-d'Or wins series 4 – 0

== All-star teams ==
First team

- Goaltender - Frédéric Cloutier, Shawinigan Cataractes
- Left defence - Danny Groulx, Victoriaville Tigres
- Right defence - Marc-André Bergeron, Shawinigan Cataractes
- Left winger - Simon Gamache, Val-d'Or Foreurs
- Centreman - Brandon Reid, Val-d'Or Foreurs
- Right winger - Radim Vrbata, Shawinigan Cataractes
- Coach - Denis Francoeur, Shawinigan Cataractes

Second team

- Goaltender - Maxime Ouellet, Rouyn-Noranda Huskies
- Left defence - Alexandre Vigneault, Acadie-Bathurst Titan
- Right defence - Chris Lyness, Montreal Rocket / Val-d'Or Foreurs
- Left winger - Jason King, Halifax Mooseheads
- Centreman - Dominic Forget, Shawinigan Cataractes
- Right winger - Marc-André Thinel, Victoriaville Tigres
- Coach - Claude Bouchard, Val-d'Or Foreurs

Rookie team

- Goaltender - Adam Russo, Acadie-Bathurst Titan
- Left defence - Francis Trudel, Sherbrooke Castors
- Right defence - Tomas Malec, Rimouski Océanic
- Left winger - Martin Frolik, Drummondville Voltigeurs
- Centreman - Pierre-Marc Bouchard, Chicoutimi Saguenéens
- Right winger - Ales Hemsky, Hull Olympiques
- Coach - Claude Bouchard, Val-d'Or Foreurs
- List of First/Second/Rookie team all-stars.

== Trophies and awards ==
Team

- President's Cup - Playoff Champions, Val-d'Or Foreurs
- Jean Rougeau Trophy - Regular Season Champions, Shawinigan Cataractes
- Robert Lebel Trophy - Team with best GAA, Shawinigan Cataractes

Player

- Michel Brière Memorial Trophy - Most Valuable Player, Simon Gamache, Val-d'Or Foreurs
- Jean Béliveau Trophy - Top Scorer, Simon Gamache, Val-d'Or Foreurs
- Guy Lafleur Trophy - Playoff MVP, Simon Gamache, Val-d'Or Foreurs
- Telus Cup – Offensive - Offensive Player of the Year, Simon Gamache, Val-d'Or Foreurs
- Telus Cup – Defensive - Defensive Player of the Year, Maxime Ouellet, Rouyn-Noranda Huskies
- AutoPro Plaque - Best plus/minus total, Simon Gamache, Val-d'Or Foreurs
- Philips Plaque - Best faceoff percentage, Pierre-Luc Emond, Drummondville Voltigeurs
- Jacques Plante Memorial Trophy - Best GAA, Frédéric Cloutier, Shawinigan Cataractes
- Emile Bouchard Trophy - Defenceman of the Year, Marc-André Bergeron, Shawinigan Cataractes
- Mike Bossy Trophy - Best Pro Prospect, Ales Hemsky, Hull Olympiques
- RDS Cup - Rookie of the Year, Pierre-Marc Bouchard, Chicoutimi Saguenéens
- Michel Bergeron Trophy - Offensive Rookie of the Year, Pierre-Marc Bouchard, Chicoutimi Saguenéens
- Raymond Lagacé Trophy - Defensive Rookie of the Year, Tomas Malec, Rimouski Océanic
- Frank J. Selke Memorial Trophy - Most sportsmanlike player, Brandon Reid, Val-d'Or Foreurs
- QMJHL Humanitarian of the Year - Humanitarian of the Year, Ali MacEachern, Halifax Mooseheads
- Marcel Robert Trophy - Best Scholastic Player, Jean-Philippe Brière, Rimouski Océanic
- Paul Dumont Trophy - Personality of the Year, Simon Gamache, Val-d'Or Foreurs

Executive

- Ron Lapointe Trophy - Coach of the Year, Denis Francoeur, Shawinigan Cataractes
- John Horman Trophy - Executive of the Year, Mario Boucher, Shawinigan Cataractes
- St-Clair Group Plaque - Marketing Director of the Year, Éric Forest, Rimouski Océanic

== See also ==
- 2001 Memorial Cup
- 2001 NHL entry draft
- 2000–01 OHL season
- 2000–01 WHL season

Preceded by 1999–2000 QMJHL season	QMJHL seasons	Succeeded by 2001–02 QMJHL season
