= Brandon Reid =

Canadian ice hockey player

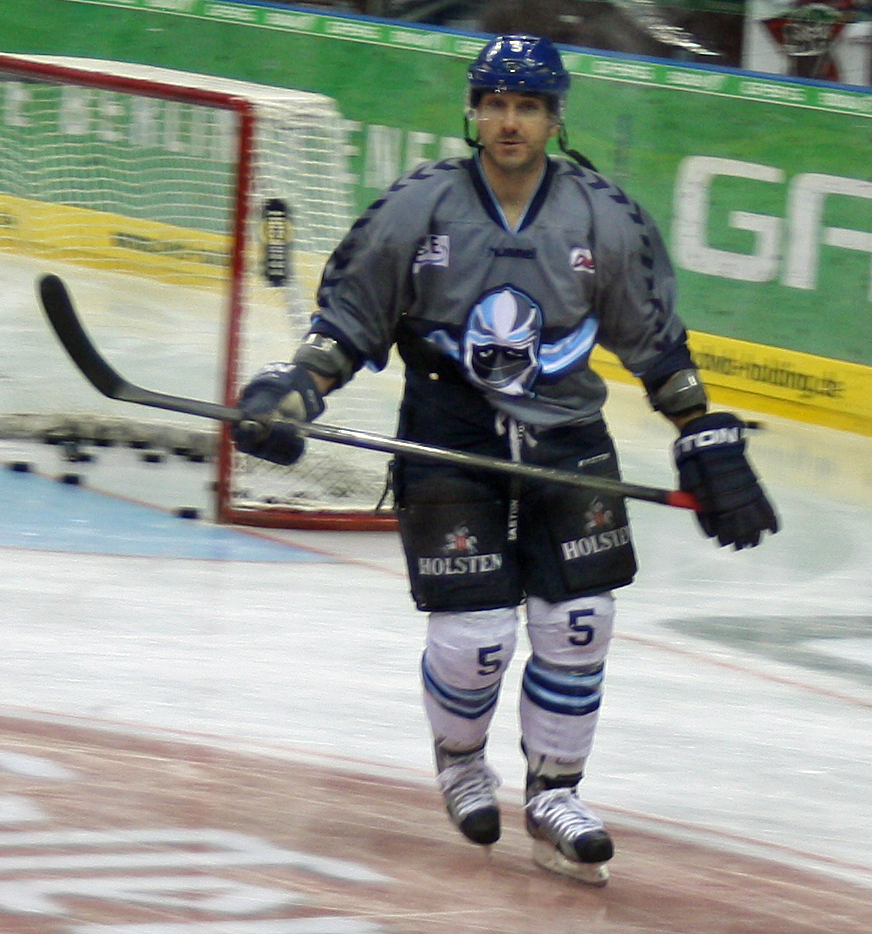
- Born: March 9, 1981 (age 45) Kirkland, Quebec, Canada
- Height: 5 ft 9 in (175 cm)
- Weight: 185 lb (84 kg; 13 st 3 lb)
- Position: Centre
- Shot: Right
- Played for: Vancouver Canucks; Hamburg Freezers; Rapperswil-Jona Lakers; DEG Metro Stars; CSKA Moscow
- National team: Canada
- NHL draft: 208th overall, 2000; Vancouver Canucks
- Playing career: 2001–2014

Brandon Reid (born March 9, 1981) is a Canadian former professional ice hockey forward, who spent parts of three seasons in the National Hockey League with the Vancouver Canucks. Until December 12, 2019, Reid served as the head coach of the Krefeld Pinguine in Germany.

== Playing, coaching career ==
As a youth, Reid played in the 1995 Quebec International Pee-Wee Hockey Tournament with a minor ice hockey team from Lac-Saint-Louis Ouest near Montreal.

=== Junior ===
Reid was a junior star for the Halifax Mooseheads of the QMJHL, but was passed over in the 1999 NHL entry draft on account of his size, and was not signed by the New York Rangers after being invited to their training camp that fall. However, he established himself as a legitimate NHL prospect after a superb performance at the 2000 World Junior Championships, where he dazzled with his speed and skill, scoring 9 points in 7 games in helping Canada to a bronze medal. He finished the 1999–2000 season with 124 points in 62 games for Halifax and helped them reach the Memorial Cup where he was named the tournament's most sportsmanlike player. Following the season, he was selected 208th overall by the Vancouver Canucks in the 2000 NHL entry draft.

For the 2000–01 season, he was dealt to the Val-d'Or Foreurs, where he continued to dominate the QMJHL and formed a deadly partnership with linemate Simon Gamache. He finished the season with 126 points in 57 games and added 42 more in 21 playoff games to help Val d'Or reach the Memorial Cup, where he was named Most Sportsmanlike Player for the second consecutive year. He also helped Canada to another bronze medal at the 2001 World Junior Championships.

=== Professional ===
Reid signed with the Canucks for the 2001–02 season, and had a decent year with the Manitoba Moose, Vancouver's AHL affiliate, with 37 points in 60 games. He upped his game considerably in 2002–03, leading the Moose with 36 assists and 54 points, impressively adding 5 points in 7 games when called up to Vancouver, including a two-goal effort against the Nashville Predators. He also played regularly for the Canucks in the playoffs, replacing Trevor Letowski on the team's checking line and impressing with his speed and energy.

Following his strong showing in the 2003 playoffs, Reid was expected to stick with the Canucks as a regular for the 2003–04 season; however, he was again sent back down to Manitoba. After a slow start, he finished well to again lead the Moose in assists and points. His relationship with the Canucks organization deteriorated however, as he felt he was not being given a fair shake and that less deserving players were being called up ahead of him. He appeared in only 3 NHL games in 2003–04, recording one assist.

Following that season, Reid became a restricted free agent and due to the NHL lockout, signed with the Hamburg Freezers of the DEL. Quickly establishing himself as an impact player in Europe, Reid led Hamburg in assists and points. After a successful season in Germany, Reid then signed with Rapperswil-Jona of the Swiss Nationalliga A.

After a solid season in Switzerland, Reid and the Canucks patched up their differences and agreed to a new one-year contract for the 2006–07 season. Reid would once again, however, find himself in Manitoba, where he struggled with just 32 points in 53 games, spending much of his time in the press box due to the AHL's veteran rule. Reid was held pointless in a three-game call-up to Vancouver though when called up for the team's final playoff game, he contributed a key assist on a goal by Alex Burrows.

After the 2006–07 season, Reid became an unrestricted free agent and signed with the DEG Metro Stars of the DEL in Germany. Reid led his team in scoring for the 08/09 season and was named MVP of the 08/09 playoffs. Reid played for the DEG Metro Stars for three seasons becoming a fan favourite. He then returned to the Swiss club Rapperswil-Jona Lakers, signing in April 2010 and remaining until the end of the 2012 season.

With great fanfare, Reid then returned to Germany for the 2012–13 season signing for a second stint with the Hamburg Freezers of the DEL.

In June 2013, Reid was invited to try out for the Kontinental Hockey League's CSKA Moscow organization by general manager Sergey Fedorov. After impressing with his speed, face-off, and scoring abilities, Reid was signed to a one-year contract. On August 17, 2014, Reid announced that he would be retiring due to injuries.

=== Coaching career ===
Shortly after announcing his retirement, Reid was signed on by the Vojens ice hockey club in Denmark, as head coach and director of player development for the Division 1 "talent team" of the SønderjyskE club of the premier Metal Ligaen, and under 20 team. As a first-year coach, Reid had a successful season bringing both teams to highest rankings in team history, including a first bronze medal for the U20 team.

At the start of the 2015/2016 season, Reid was invited to be assistant coach at the Canadian National Sledge Hockey development camp. After impressing staff and building a great rapport with players, Reid was invited back to assist at the team's selection camp. Reid stayed on as assistant coach for the remainder of the 15/16 season, helping lead the team to one gold and two silver medals at various international tournaments.

On May 31, 2016, he was appointed as head coach of the Aalborg Pirates of the Metal Ligaen, Denmark's top league. After quickly leading the team to first place, winning the first eight regular season games in a row, Reid was re-signed by the Pirates for an additional two seasons. Reid and the Pirates impressively held onto first place throughout that entire season. Reid then continued his success with the Aalborg Pirates in 2017-2018, leading the team to their first trophy in club history, winning the in-season Final Four Pokal tournament, and qualifying the Pirates for the Continental Cup in 2018-2019. Under Reid's guidance, Aalborg went on to win its first Danish national championship since 1981 and the national cup competition in the 2017-18 season. He was also named Coach of the Year in Denmark that season.

On May 1, 2018, he was named head coach of German DEL side Krefeld Pinguine. Following a 7-19 start into the 2019-20 season, he was sacked by the Krefeld team on December 12, 2019.

== Career statistics ==
=== Regular season and playoffs ===
			Regular season					Playoffs
Season	Team	League	GP	G	A	Pts	PIM	GP	G	A	Pts	PIM
1996–97	Lac St–Louis Lions	QMAAA	44	17	34	51	16	7	2	3	5	—
1997–98	Halifax Mooseheads	QMJHL	67	13	21	34	6	5	1	0	1	15
1998–99	Halifax Mooseheads	QMJHL	70	32	25	57	33	5	2	2	4	0
1999–2000	Halifax Mooseheads	QMJHL	62	44	80	124	10	10	7	11	18	4
2000–01	Val–d'Or Foreurs	QMJHL	57	45	81	126	18	21	13	29	42	14
2001–02	Manitoba Moose	AHL	60	18	19	37	6	7	0	3	3	0
2002–03	Vancouver Canucks	NHL	7	2	3	5	0	9	0	1	1	0
2002–03	Manitoba Moose	AHL	73	18	36	54	18	1	1	1	2	0
2003–04	Vancouver Canucks	NHL	3	0	1	1	0	—	—	—	—	—
2003–04	Manitoba Moose	AHL	73	19	39	58	20	—	—	—	—	—
2004–05	Hamburg Freezers	DEL	45	18	29	47	41	6	0	3	3	4
2005–06	Rapperswil–Jona Lakers	NLA	44	16	18	34	16	12	4	7	11	14
2006–07	Vancouver Canucks	NHL	3	0	0	0	0	1	0	1	1	0
2006–07	Manitoba Moose	AHL	53	15	17	32	19	10	2	3	5	4
2007–08	DEG Metro Stars	DEL	56	12	28	40	8	13	7	4	11	4
2008–09	DEG Metro Stars	DEL	52	24	25	49	14	16	5	16	21	4
2009–10	DEG Metro Stars	DEL	56	22	26	48	18	3	0	0	0	0
2010–11	Rapperswil–Jona Lakers	NLA	44	8	18	26	8	—	—	—	—	—
2011–12	Rapperswil–Jona Lakers	NLA	39	6	10	16	8	—	—	—	—	—
2012–13	Hamburg Freezers	DEL	48	10	12	22	12	6	3	2	5	2
2013–14	CSKA Moscow	KHL	26	3	6	9	6	—	—	—	—	—
AHL totals			259	70	111	181	63	18	3	7	10	4
NHL totals			13	2	4	6	0	10	0	2	2	0
DEL totals			257	86	120	206	93	44	15	25	40	14

=== International ===
Year	Team	Event	GP	G	A	Pts	PIM
2000	Canada	WJC	7	4	5	9	4
2001	Canada	WJC	7	1	3	4	0
Junior totals			14	5	8	13	4

== Awards and achievements ==
- Named to QMJHL Second All-Star Team (1999–2000)
- Named Memorial Cup Most Sportsmanlike Player (2000, 2001)
- Named to QMJHL First All-Star Team (2000–01)
- Named CHL Most Sportsmanlike Player (2000–01)
- Named to CHL Second All-Star Team (2000–01)
- Won QMJHL Championship (2001)
- Won Bronze Medal at World Junior Championships (2000, 2001)
- Led Manitoba Moose (AHL) in scoring (2002–03, 2003–04)
- Ranked 7th for all-time franchise scoring leaders for the Manitoba Moose (AHL)
- Led Hamburg Freezers (DEL) in scoring (2004–05)
- Led DEG Metro Stars (DEL) in scoring (2008–09)
- Named Playoff MVP (DEL) (2008–09)
- Won Metal Ligaen Pokal Cup (Head coach, Aalborg Pirates) (2017-2018)
- 2017-2018 Metal Ligaen Coach of the Year
