= Jean-François David =

Canadian ice hockey player

- Born: April 29, 1982 (age 43) Blainville, Quebec, Canada
- Height: 6 ft 1 in (185 cm)
- Weight: 190 lb (86 kg; 13 st 8 lb)
- Position: Defenceman
- Shot: Left
- team Former teams: Free Agent; Bridgeport Sound Tigers; Hershey Bears; Manitoba Moose; Binghamton Senators; EHC Black Wings Linz; Dragons de Rouen; Springfield Falcons; Ducs d'Angers
- NHL draft: Undrafted
- Playing career: 2003–2012; 2021–2021

Jean-François David (born April 29, 1982) is a Canadian former professional ice hockey player and coach, who has previously served as an assistant coach with the Cape Breton Screaming Eagles of the Quebec Major Junior Hockey League.

== Playing career ==
Born in Blainville, Quebec, David played junior hockey in the Quebec Major Junior Hockey League for the Shawinigan Cataractes. After four seasons with the team, he briefly turned pro in 2002, playing eleven games in the ECHL for the Trenton Titans and six games in the AHL for the Bridgeport Sound Tigers before returning to the QMJHL for the Baie-Comeau Drakkar.

He played his first full pro season during 2003–04, playing in the Central Hockey League for the Laredo Bucks where he won the Ray Miron President's Cup, the CHL championship trophy. In 2004, he signed for the Danbury Thrashers of the United Hockey League, scoring 41 points in 78 league games. He also played 2 games in the AHL for the Hershey Bears. In 2005, David played 16 games for the ECHL's South Carolina Stingrays before moving to Germany to play for 2nd Bundesliga side the Essen Moskitos. In 2006, he returned to the ECHL for the Texas Wildcatters. He scored 23 points in 19 games before moving back to the AHL, playing one game for the Manitoba Moose before finishing the season with the Binghamton Senators.

In 2007, David returned to Europe, signing for Austrian side Black Wings Linz. In 2008, David moved to France and signed with Dragons de Rouen. In 2009 David returned to North American and began the 2009–10 season with Elmira Jackals in the ECHL playing 20 games registering a goal and five assists along with 10 PIMs, before joining the Springfield Falcons. He then split the 2010-11 season in the ECHL for the Bakersfield Condors and then Florida Everblades before returning to France for Ducs d'Angers. After two years off David joined his hometown Trois-Rivieres Blizzard CNS of the minor-professional Ligue Nord-Americaine de Hockey, where he put up over a point per game in his first season with the team.

On November 2, 2021, David returned once more to the professional circuit after 5 seasons, agreeing again to a contract with his hometown team, this time the Trois-Rivières Lions of the ECHL, in their inaugural season. David, however, was released from Trois-Rivieres on November 11, 2021 having played three games.

=== Coaching ===
David announced his retirement as a player on June 4, 2012 and was hired as an assistant coach of the QMJHL's Cape Breton Screaming Eagles. With the Screaming Eagles, David worked with the team's defencemen. David left the team after one season, citing a desire to be closer to his family in Quebec. David experienced three years in the QMJHL as an assistant with the Screaming Eagles, Titans and Tigres.

== Career statistics ==
			Regular season					Playoffs
Season	Team	League	GP	G	A	Pts	PIM	GP	G	A	Pts	PIM
1998–99	Shawinigan Cataractes	QMJHL	7	0	1	1	0	1	0	0	0	2
1999–00	Shawinigan Cataractes	QMJHL	71	7	11	18	90	13	5	2	7	10
2000–01	Shawinigan Cataractes	QMJHL	65	14	38	52	160	10	2	4	6	14
2001–02	Shawinigan Cataractes	QMJHL	70	21	49	70	164	10	2	12	14	22
2002–03	Baie-Comeau Drakkar	QMJHL	32	11	28	39	98	12	2	6	8	16
2002–03	Trenton Titans	ECHL	11	0	5	5	16	—	—	—	—	—
2002–03	Bridgeport Sound Tigers	AHL	6	0	0	0	0	—	—	—	—	—
2003–04	Laredo Bucks	CHL	57	10	24	34	105	16	1	4	5	43
2004–05	Danbury Trashers	UHL	78	9	32	41	126	11	2	6	8	8
2004–05	Hershey Bears	AHL	2	0	0	0	0	—	—	—	—	—
2005–06	South Carolina Stingrays	ECHL	16	4	10	14	25	—	—	—	—	—
2005–06	Essen Moskitos	2.GBun	27	6	14	20	62	—	—	—	—	—
2006–07	Texas Wildcatters	ECHL	19	3	20	23	57	9	3	2	5	43
2006–07	Manitoba Moose	AHL	1	0	1	1	2	—	—	—	—	—
2006–07	Binghamton Senators	AHL	44	5	14	19	62	—	—	—	—	—
2007–08	EHC Black Wings Linz	EBEL	46	3	19	22	85	8	1	1	2	34
2008–09	Dragons de Rouen	FRA	23	2	24	26	60	6	1	7	8	32
2009–10	Elmira Jackals	ECHL	20	1	6	7	10	—	—	—	—	—
2009–10	Springfield Falcons	AHL	27	1	7	8	10	—	—	—	—	—
2010–11	Bakersfield Condors	ECHL	39	7	15	22	59	—	—	—	—	—
2011–12	Ducs d'Angers	FRA	23	4	11	15	47	5	2	2	4	6
2014–15	Trois-Rivieres Blizzard CNS	LNAH	31	6	26	32	30	14	0	5	5	16
2015–16	Trois-Rivieres Blizzard CNS	LNAH	5	2	0	2	18	3	0	0	0	14
2021–22	Trois-Rivières Lions	ECHL	3	0	1	1	0	—	—	—	—	—
AHL totals			80	6	22	28	74	—	—	—	—	—
