= Stéphane Veilleux =

Canadian ice hockey player (born 1981)

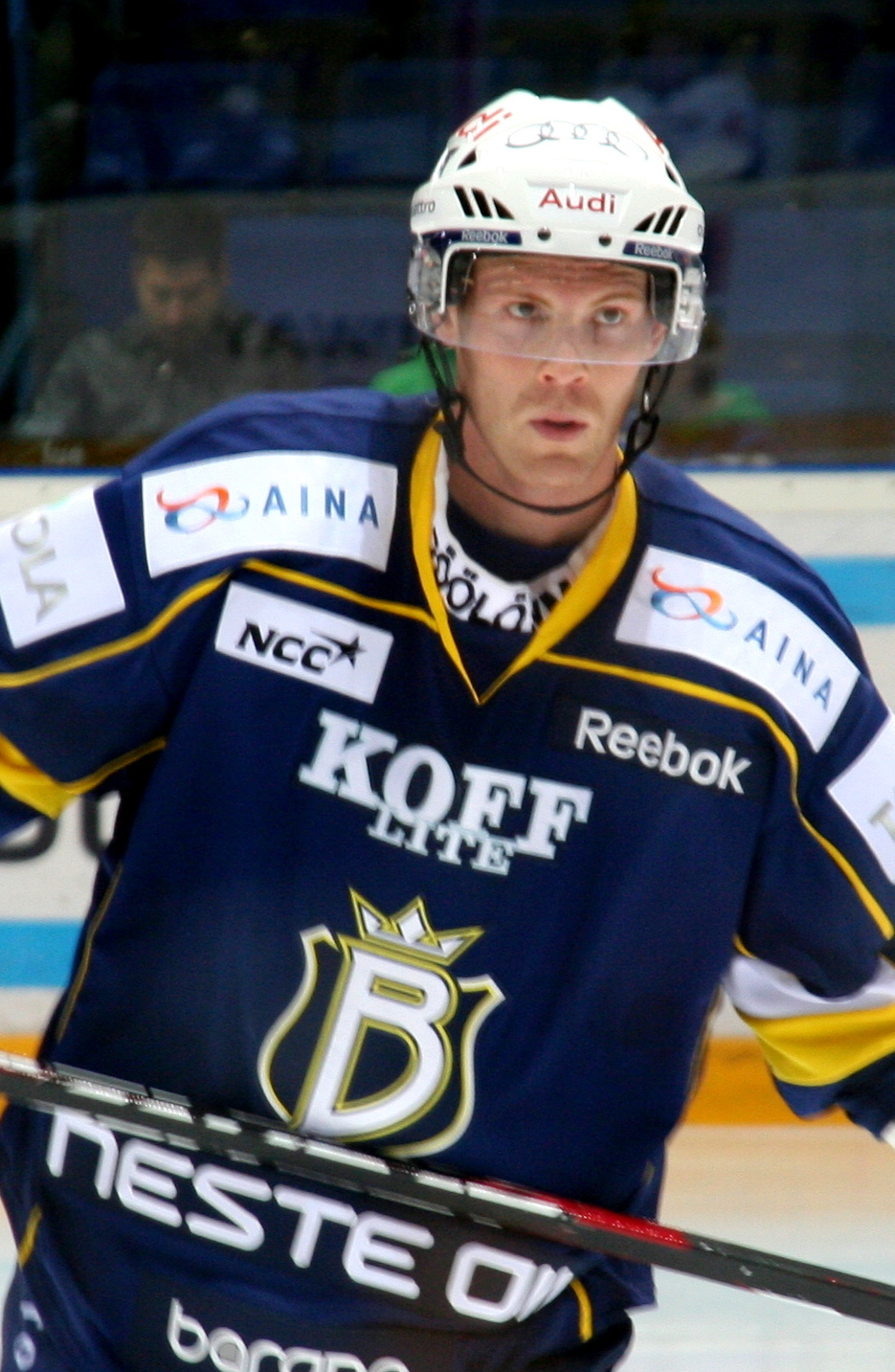
- Born: November 16, 1981 (age 44) Saint-Georges, Quebec, Canada
- Height: 6 ft 1 in (185 cm)
- Weight: 200 lb (91 kg; 14 st 4 lb)
- Position: Left wing
- Shot: Left
- Played for: Minnesota Wild; Espoo Blues; HC Ambrì-Piotta; Tampa Bay Lightning; New Jersey Devils; Oji Eagles
- NHL draft: 93rd overall, 2001; Minnesota Wild
- Playing career: 2001–2018

Stéphane Veilleux (born November 16, 1981) is a Canadian former professional ice hockey left winger. He most notably played in the National Hockey League (NHL) with the Minnesota Wild, Tampa Bay Lightning and the New Jersey Devils.

== Playing career ==
As a youth, Veilleux played in the 1994 and 1995 Quebec International Pee-Wee Hockey Tournaments with a minor ice hockey team from Beauce, Quebec.

Veilleux was drafted in the third round, 93rd overall by the Minnesota Wild in the 2001 NHL entry draft. He went on to play a total of six seasons for the Wild, playing many games alongside star forward Marián Gáborík. After the 2008–09 season, the Wild decided not to renew his contract, and he was released into unrestricted free agency. On July 7, 2009, he signed a one-year contract with the Tampa Bay Lightning. On December 28, 2009, he skated in his 400th career NHL game, playing against the Boston Bruins.

In October 2010, Veilloux signed for Espoo Blues of the Finnish SM-liiga. He left the team in January and signed with Swiss National League A team HC Ambrì-Piotta. On July 29, 2011, he then signed a one-year deal with the New Jersey Devils.

On February 24, 2012, Veilleux was traded, along with Kurtis Foster, Nick Palmieri and the Washington Capitals' second-round pick in 2012, back to the Minnesota Wild in exchange for defenceman Marek Židlický.

== Personal life ==
Veilleux is known as an avid table tennis player in his spare time, and also plays before games as warm-ups.

== Career statistics ==
			Regular season					Playoffs
Season	Team	League	GP	G	A	Pts	PIM	GP	G	A	Pts	PIM
1997–98	Lévis Commandeurs	QMAAA	14	3	5	8	12	1	0	0	0	0
1998–99	Victoriaville Tigres	QMJHL	65	6	13	19	35	6	1	3	4	2
1999–2000	Victoriaville Tigres	QMJHL	22	1	4	5	17	—	—	—	—	—
1999–2000	Val–d'Or Foreurs	QMJHL	50	14	28	42	100	—	—	—	—	—
2000–01	Val–d'Or Foreurs	QMJHL	68	48	67	115	90	21	15	18	33	42
2001–02	Houston Aeros	AHL	77	13	22	35	113	14	2	4	6	20
2002–03	Houston Aeros	AHL	29	8	4	12	43	23	7	11	18	12
2002–03	Minnesota Wild	NHL	38	3	2	5	23	—	—	—	—	—
2003–04	Houston Aeros	AHL	64	13	25	38	66	2	1	1	2	2
2003–04	Minnesota Wild	NHL	19	2	8	10	20	—	—	—	—	—
2004–05	Houston Aeros	AHL	59	15	24	39	35	—	—	—	—	—
2005–06	Minnesota Wild	NHL	71	7	9	16	63	—	—	—	—	—
2006–07	Minnesota Wild	NHL	75	7	11	18	47	5	0	0	0	4
2007–08	Minnesota Wild	NHL	77	11	7	18	61	6	0	0	0	27
2008–09	Minnesota Wild	NHL	81	13	10	23	40	—	—	—	—	—
2009–10	Tampa Bay Lightning	NHL	77	3	6	9	48	—	—	—	—	—
2010–11	Blues	SM-liiga	25	1	6	7	18	—	—	—	—	—
2010–11	HC Ambrì–Piotta	NLA	7	0	0	0	4	—	—	—	—	—
2011–12	Albany Devils	AHL	40	11	11	22	53	—	—	—	—	—
2011–12	New Jersey Devils	NHL	1	0	0	0	0	—	—	—	—	—
2011–12	Minnesota Wild	NHL	21	0	2	2	15	—	—	—	—	—
2012–13	Houston Aeros	AHL	33	3	5	8	45	3	0	1	1	6
2012–13	Minnesota Wild	NHL	—	—	—	—	—	2	0	0	0	0
2013–14	Iowa Wild	AHL	34	5	9	14	33	—	—	—	—	—
2013–14	Minnesota Wild	NHL	34	3	0	3	21	4	0	0	0	4
2014–15	Iowa Wild	AHL	60	5	15	20	81	—	—	—	—	—
2014–15	Minnesota Wild	NHL	12	1	1	2	10	—	—	—	—	—
2015–16	Oji Eagles	ALH	28	13	17	30	108	2	0	1	1	2
2016–17	Oji Eagles	ALH	48	12	30	42	123	2	1	2	3	14
2017–18	Oji Eagles	ALH	28	8	8	16	56	12	6	4	10	35
AHL totals			396	73	115	188	469	42	10	18	28	40
NHL totals			506	50	56	106	348	17	0	0	0	35
