= Olivier Michaud =

Canadian ice hockey player

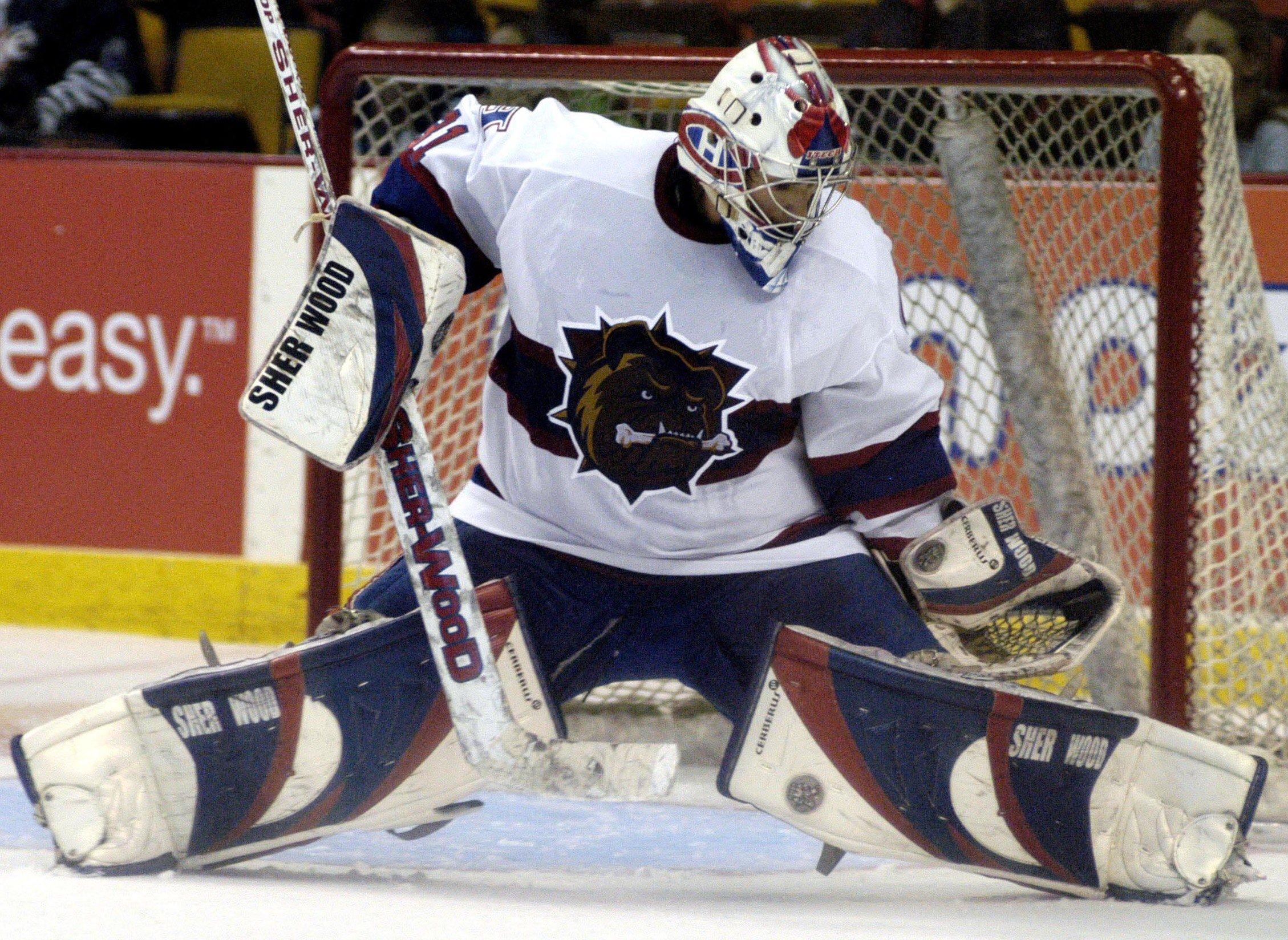
- Michaud with the Hamilton Bulldogs in 2005
- Born: September 14, 1983 (age 42); Beloeil, Quebec, Canada
- Height: 5 ft 11 in (180 cm)
- Weight: 172 lb (78 kg; 12 st 4 lb)
- Position: Goaltender
- Caught: Left
- Played for: Montreal Canadiens
- NHL draft: Undrafted
- Playing career: 2001–2009

Olivier Léo Patrick Alexandre Michaud (born September 14, 1983) is a Canadian former professional ice hockey goaltender. He played one game in the National Hockey League with the Montreal Canadiens during the 2001–02 season

== Biography ==
Michaud was born in Beloeil, Quebec. As a youth, he played in the 1997 Quebec International Pee-Wee Hockey Tournament with the Richelieu Laser minor ice hockey team.

Michaud played one game in the National Hockey League (NHL) with the Montreal Canadiens during the 2001–02 season. His appearance, which came on October 30, 2001, was due to the loss of Jose Theodore and backup Jeff Hackett to injury, and Michaud became an emergency call-up from his junior team to backup third-string Mathieu Garon. Michaud relieved Garon for one period, making 14 saves in 18 minutes of action while not giving up a goal. This appearance made him the youngest player to ever tend goal for the Canadiens and the second-youngest goaltender to play in the NHL. He resides in Montreal, where he operates a goaltending school, Ecole de Gardiens de But Olivier Michaud.

== Career statistics ==
=== Regular season and playoffs ===
			Regular season										Playoffs
Season	Team	League	GP	W	L	T	OTL	MIN	GA	SO	GAA	SV%	GP	W	L	MIN	GA	SO	GAA	SV%
1998–99	Eclaireur Bantams	QAHA	23	14	4	5	—	1380	58	—	2.50	—	—	—	—	—	—	—	—	—
1999–00	Collège Antoine-Girouard Gaulois	QMAAA	7	6	1	0	—	420	15	1	2.14	—	—	—	—	—	—	—	—	—
1999–00	Collège Charles-Lemoyne Riverains	QMAAA	16	8	4	2	—	886	57	0	3.86	.873	16	8	8	1015	29	2	1.71	—
1999–00	Shawinigan Cataractes	QMJHL	1	0	1	0	—	49	2	0	2.44	.920	—	—	—	—	—	—	—	—
2000–01	Shawinigan Cataractes	QMJHL	21	12	4	4	—	1096	54	1	2.96	.882	3	1	2	150	6	0	2.41	.912
2001–02	Montreal Canadiens	NHL	1	0	0	0	—	19	0	0	0.00	1.000	—	—	—	—	—	—	—	—
2001–02	Shawinigan Cataractes	QMJHL	46	29	11	3	—	2650	108	3	2.45	.887	12	7	5	744	36	0	2.91	.905
2002–03	Shawinigan Cataractes	QMJHL	27	8	13	3	—	1497	82	1	3.29	.889	—	—	—	—	—	—	—	—
2002–03	Baie-Comeau Drakkar	QMJHL	31	23	5	2	—	1775	90	3	3.04	.899	12	7	5	748	38	0	3.05	.905
2003–04	Columbus Cottonmouths	ECHL	22	8	10	2	—	1234	62	1	3.01	.896	—	—	—	—	—	—	—	—
2003–04	Hamilton Bulldogs	AHL	16	4	7	3	—	900	38	2	2.53	.905	—	—	—	—	—	—	—	—
2004–05	Long Beach Ice Dogs	ECHL	41	18	14	6	—	2315	98	1	2.54	.918	1	0	1	59	4	0	4.10	.840
2005–06	Hamilton Bulldogs	AHL	14	6	5	—	1	748	41	0	3.29	.893	—	—	—	—	—	—	—	—
2005–06	Long Beach Ice Dogs	ECHL	16	6	7	—	1	811	46	0	3.40	.888	2	1	1	84	9	0	6.39	.820
2006–07	Summum-Chiefs de Saint-Jean-sur-Richelieu	LNAH	34	—	—	—	—	—	—	—	3.27	.905	—	—	—	—	—	—	—	—
2007–08	Summum-Chiefs de Saint-Jean-sur-Richelieu	LNAH	39	—	—	—	—	—	—	—	4.35	.883	—	—	—	—	—	—	—	—
2008–09	Chiefs de Saint-Hyacinthe	LNAH	28	—	—	—	—	—	—	—	3.83	.890	—	—	—	—	—	—	—	—
2009–10	Isothermic de Thetford Mines	LNAH	29	—	—	—	—	—	—	—	4.31	.877	—	—	—	—	—	—	—	—
NHL totals			1	0	0	0	—	19	0	0	0.00	1.000	—	—	—	—	—	—	—	—

=== International ===
Year	Team	Event	GP	W	L	T	MIN	GA	SO	GAA	SV%
2002	Canada	WJC	2	—	—	—	120	5	0	2.50	.924
Junior totals			2	—	—	—	120	5	0	2.50	.924
