= Simon Lajeunesse =

Canadian ice hockey player (born 1981)

- Born: January 22, 1981 (age 45) Quebec City, Quebec, Canada
- Height: 6 ft 1 in (185 cm)
- Weight: 178 lb (81 kg; 12 st 10 lb)
- Position: Goaltender
- Caught: Left
- Played for: Ottawa Senators
- NHL draft: 48th overall, 1999; Ottawa Senators
- Playing career: 2001–2005

Simon Lajeunesse (born January 22, 1981) is a Canadian former professional ice hockey goaltender. He was drafted in the second round (48th overall) of the 1999 NHL entry draft by the Ottawa Senators and played a single National Hockey League (NHL) game with the Senators during the 2001-02 season.

== Playing career ==
Lajeunesse played his junior hockey in the Quebec Major Junior Hockey League. His play with the Moncton Wildcats attracted the attention of the Ottawa Senators, who selected him 48th overall in the 1999 NHL Entry Draft. He turned professional in 2001 with the Senators, playing for their minor league affiliate Grand Rapids Griffins of the American Hockey League (AHL) along with some games in the East Coast Hockey League (ECHL) with the Mobile Mysticks. Lajeunesse was called up to the Senators and he played 24 minutes of a March 7, 2002, game with the Senators, stopping all nine shots he faced. But due to a back injury, he couldn't continue the game. It would be the only time he would play in the NHL. The next season, he returned to the minor leagues and he did not return to the NHL. He played one further season in the Senators' system before being traded by Ottawa to the Florida Panthers for Joey Tetarenko on March 4, 2003. The rest of his career was spent playing for the San Antonio Rampage of the AHL and several teams in the ECHL. He finished his career with two seasons in the semi-pro Ligue Nord-Américaine de Hockey (LNAH) with Laval and St. George's before retiring in 2007 at the age of 26.

== Career statistics ==
=== Regular season and playoffs ===
| | | | Regular season | | | | | | | | | Playoffs |
| Season | Team | League | GP | W | L | T | MIN | GA | SO | GAA | SV% | GP | W | L | MIN | GA | SO | GAA | SV% |
|---|---|---|---|---|---|---|---|---|---|---|---|---|---|---|---|---|---|---|---|
| 1996–97 | Cap-de-la-Madeleine Estacades | QMAAA | 23 | 15 | 5 | 1 | 1300 | 89 | 0 | 4.11 | — | 4 | 1 | 3 | 240 | 26 | 0 | 4.72 | — |
| 1997–98 | Moncton Wildcats | QMJHL | 19 | 5 | 6 | 3 | 925 | 51 | 1 | 3.31 | .863 | 2 | 0 | 0 | 1 | 0 | 0 | 0.00 | 1.000 |
| 1998–99 | Moncton Wildcats | QMJHL | 36 | 18 | 9 | 3 | 1993 | 98 | 1 | 2.95 | .891 | 1 | 0 | 0 | 43 | 2 | 0 | 2.79 | .889 |
| 1999–00 | Moncton Wildcats | QMJHL | 55 | 31 | 15 | 1 | 2922 | 127 | 6 | 2.61 | .903 | 16 | 9 | 6 | 910 | 56 | 1 | 3.69 | .887 |
| 2000–01 | Acadie-Bathurst Titan | QMJHL | 36 | 10 | 19 | 2 | 1879 | 121 | 1 | 3.86 | .889 | — | — | — | — | — | — | — | — |
| 2000–01 | Val d'Or Foreurs | QMJHL | 21 | 16 | 3 | 1 | 1159 | 54 | 1 | 2.80 | .903 | 14 | 8 | 4 | 760 | 52 | 0 | 4.10 | .896 |
| 2001–02 | Ottawa Senators | NHL | 1 | 0 | 0 | 0 | 24 | 0 | 0 | 0.00 | 1.000 | — | — | — | — | — | — | — | — |
| 2001–02 | Mobile Mysticks | ECHL | 13 | 7 | 2 | 3 | 755 | 36 | 2 | 2.86 | .910 | — | — | — | — | — | — | — | — |
| 2001–02 | Grand Rapids Griffins | AHL | 26 | 13 | 7 | 5 | 1534 | 54 | 3 | 2.11 | .916 | 2 | 0 | 0 | 21 | 1 | 0 | 2.82 | .750 |
| 2002–03 | Binghamton Senators | AHL | 19 | 7 | 7 | 1 | 966 | 47 | 1 | 2.92 | .896 | — | — | — | — | — | — | — | — |
| 2002–03 | San Antonio Rampage | AHL | 2 | 0 | 1 | 0 | 78 | 6 | 0 | 4.60 | .824 | — | — | — | — | — | — | — | — |
| 2002–03 | Peoria Rivemen | ECHL | 4 | 2 | 2 | 0 | 239 | 8 | 0 | 2.01 | .928 | — | — | — | — | — | — | — | — |
| 2003–04 | San Antonio Rampage | AHL | 8 | 1 | 4 | 1 | 351 | 23 | 0 | 3.93 | .877 | — | — | — | — | — | — | — | — |
| 2003–04 | Augusta Lynx | ECHL | 2 | 1 | 1 | 0 | 125 | 8 | 0 | 3.84 | .864 | — | — | — | — | — | — | — | — |
| 2003–04 | Columbus Cottonmouths | ECHL | 1 | 0 | 0 | 0 | 26 | 1 | 0 | 2.31 | .933 | — | — | — | — | — | — | — | — |
| 2004–05 | Dayton Bombers | ECHL | 10 | 2 | 4 | 2 | 535 | 25 | 0 | 2.80 | .906 | — | — | — | — | — | — | — | — |
| 2004–05 | Fresno Falcons | ECHL | 8 | 2 | 5 | 0 | 457 | 27 | 1 | 3.54 | .896 | — | — | — | — | — | — | — | — |
| 2004–05 | Gwinnett Gladiators | ECHL | 4 | 1 | 3 | 0 | 226 | 13 | 0 | 3.45 | .869 | — | — | — | — | — | — | — | — |
| 2004–05 | San Diego Gulls | ECHL | 3 | 1 | 1 | 1 | 144 | 8 | 0 | 3.34 | .896 | — | — | — | — | — | — | — | — |
| 2005–06 | Chiefs de Laval | LNAH | 2 | — | — | — | — | — | — | — | — | — | — | — | — | — | — | — | — |
| 2006–07 | CRS Express de Saint-Georges | LNAH | 13 | — | — | — | — | — | — | — | — | — | — | — | — | — | — | — | — |
| NHL totals | | | 1 | 0 | 0 | 0 | 24 | 0 | 0 | 0.00 | 1.000 | — | — | — | — | — | — | — | — |

=== Awards ===
- 2002 - Hap Holmes Memorial Award (lowest goals against average (GAA))

== See also ==
- List of players who played only one game in the NHL
