= Val-d'Or Foreurs =

Junior ice hockey team in Val-d'Or, Quebec

Val-d'Or Foreurs Foreurs de Val-d'Or
- City: Val-d'Or, Quebec
- League: Quebec Maritimes Junior Hockey League
- Conference: Western
- Division: West
- Founded: 1993; 33 years ago
- Home arena: Centre Agnico Eagle
- Colours: Green, gold, white and black
- General manager: Maxime Desruisseaux
- Head coach: Maxime Desruisseaux
- Website: www.foreurs.qc.ca

Championships
- Playoff championships: QMJHL Champions (1998, 2001, 2014)

The Val-d'Or Foreurs are a Canadian junior ice hockey team based in Val-d'Or, in the region of Abitibi-Témiscamingue, Quebec. They play in the Quebec Maritimes Junior Hockey League, one of the three component leagues of the Canadian Hockey League. The team name, Val-d'Or Foreurs, translates to the "Valley of Gold Drillers"; this name references the drilling operations associated with mining and exploration which are a major source of blue-collar work in the area. The Foreurs play their home games in the Centre Agnico Eagle.

== History ==
After years of Val d'Or residents attempting to get a local junior hockey team, the Val d'Or Foreurs started play for the 1993-94 season of the Quebec Maritimes Junior Hockey League (LHJMQ). Former Quebec Nordiques and Trois-Rivières Draveurs star, Pierre Aubry was the team's first coach.

The Foreurs have won the President's Cup three times: in 1997–98, 2000–01 and 2013–14 and consequently have also played for the Memorial Cup each of those years. The team was eliminated in 1998 tournament without advancing from the round robin phase. They made the 2001 championship game, but lost to the Red Deer Rebels in overtime. In the 2014 tournament, the Foreurs made the semi-finals, where they lost the longest game in Memorial Cup history, 4-3 in triple overtime to the Edmonton Oil Kings.

In 1996, the Rouyn-Noranda Huskies began play, giving the Foreurs a natural geographical rival in north-western Quebec. Rouyn-Noranda lies approximately 100 kilometres to the west of Val d'Or. Games between the two teams are a major event in the region and draw much larger than average crowds.

== NHL alumni ==
- Nicolas Aube-Kubel
- Steve Bégin
- Antoine Bibeau
- Sébastien Bisaillon
- Patrick Bordeleau
- Luc Bourdon
- Sébastien Charpentier
- Jean-Pierre Dumont
- Benoît Dusablon
- Simon Gamache
- Jacob Gaucher
- Julien Gauthier
- Jean-Luc Grand-Pierre
- Ryan Graves
- Maxence Guenette
- Samuel Henley
- Nathan Légaré
- Simon Lajeunesse
- Francis Lessard
- Kris Letang
- Roberto Luongo
- Anthony Mantha
- Brad Marchand
- Jakob Pelletier
- Samuel Poulin
- Brandon Reid
- Anthony Richard
- Justin Robidas
- Mathieu Roy
- Jerome Samson
- Maxime Sauvé
- Marco Scandella
- Jordan Spence
- Stéphane Veilleux

== Playoffs results ==
Season	1st round	2nd round	3rd round	Finals
1993–94	–	–	–	–
1994–95	–	–	–	–
1995–96	Advanced	L, 3–4, Hull	–	–
1996–97	W. 3–0, Sherbrooke	W, 4–1, Granby	L, 1–4, Hull	–
1997–98	W, 4–2, Shawinigan	2–2, Round-robin, Hull/Laval	W, 4–1, Laval	W, 4–0, Rimouski
1998–99	L, 2–4, Sherbrooke	–	–	–
1999–2000	–	–	–	–
2000–01	W, 4–0, Sherbrooke	W, 4–3, Victoriaville	W, 4–2, Shawinigan	W, 4–0, Acadie-Bathurst
2001–02	L, 3–4, Drummondville	–	–	–
2002–03	Bye	W, 4–1, Shawinigan	L, 0–4, Hull	–
2003–04	L, 3–4, Chicoutimi	–	–	–
2004–05	–	–	–	–
2005–06	L, 1–4, Quebec	–	–	–
2006–07	W, 4–0, Chicoutimi	W, 4–1, Baie-Comeau	W, 4–3, Cape Breton	L, 0–4, Lewiston
2007–08	L, 0–4, Rouyn-Noranda	–	–	–
2008–09	–	–	–	–
2009–10	L, 2–4, Rouyn-Noranda	–	–	–
2010–11	L, 0–4, Quebec	–	–	–
2011–12	L, 0–4, Rimouski	–	–	–
2012–13	W, 4–2, P.E.I.	L, 0–4, Blainville-Boisbriand	–	–
2013–14	W, 4–0, Acadie-Bathurst	W, 4–2, Drummondville	W, 4–3, Halifax	W, 4–3, Baie-Comeau
2014–15	W, 4–2, Rouyn-Noranda	W, 4–3, Baie-Comeau	L, 0–4, Rimouski	–
2015–16	L, 2–4, Blainville-Boisbriand	–	–	–
2016–17	W, 4–2, Shawinigan	L, 0–4, Saint John	–	–
2017–18	L, 0–4, Blainville-Boisbriand	–	–	–
2018–19	L, 3–4, Victoriaville	–	–	–
2019–20	QMJHL playoffs cancelled			
2020–21	W, 3–0, Baie-Comeau	W, 3–0, Rimouski	W, 3–0, Chicoutimi	L, 2–4, Victoriaville
2021–22	L, 1–3, Gatineau	–	–	–
2022–23	–	–	–	–
2023–24	–	–	–	–
2024–25	L, 1–4, Shawinigan	–	–	–
2025–26	W, 4–1, Drummondville	L, 0–4, Moncton	–	–
