= Denis Francoeur =

Canadian ice hockey coach

- Born: February 17, 1963 (age 63); Shawinigan, Quebec, Canada
- Occupations: Ice hockey coach and executive
- Years active: 1987 to present
- Employer: Baie-Comeau Drakkar
- Organization: QMJHL

Denis Francoeur (born February 17, 1963) is a Canadian ice hockey coach. He is currently the assistant general manager of the Baie-Comeau Drakkar in the Quebec Major Junior Hockey League (QMJHL).

Between 1987 and 2005, Francoeur served as a head coach for the Shawinigan Cataractes of the Quebec Major Junior Hockey League (QMJHL) where he won the 2000–01 Ron Lapointe Trophy as the QMJHL coach of the year. He also coached the Acadie-Bathurst Titan during the 2007–08 QMJHL season.

== Awards and honours ==
Award	Year
Ron Lapointe Trophy - QMJHL Coach of the Year	2000–01
