= Tomáš Malec =

Slovak professional ice hockey player (born 1982)

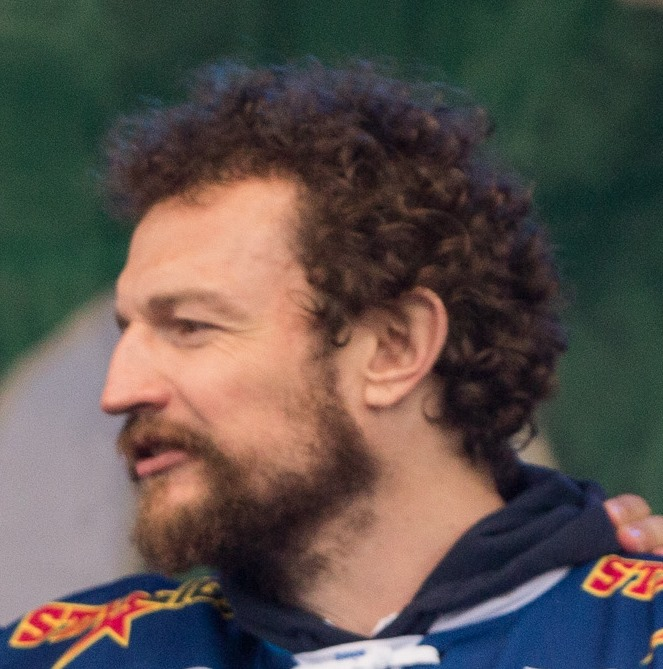
- Malec in 2017
- Born: 13 May 1982 (age 42); Skalica, Czechoslovakia
- Height: 6 ft 2 in (188 cm)
- Weight: 231 lb (105 kg; 16 st 7 lb)
- Position: Defence
- Shot: Left
- Played for: Carolina Hurricanes; Ottawa Senators; HC Oceláři Třinec; Piráti Chomutov; HC Vítkovice Ridera; HC Kometa Brno
- NHL draft: 64th overall, 2001; Florida Panthers
- Playing career: 2002–2020

Tomáš Malec (born 13 May 1982) is a Slovak former professional ice hockey player. He last played for HC Kometa Brno in the Czech Extraliga (ELH).

== Playing career ==
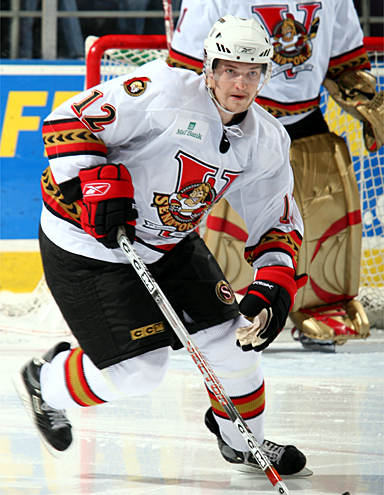
Malec with the Binghamton Senators during the 2006-07 season

After playing two seasons in the QMJHL with Rimouski Océanic, during which the Florida Panthers traded his rights to the Carolina Hurricanes, Malec made his professional debut in the 2002 American Hockey League playoffs with the Hurricanes' affiliate, the Lowell Lock Monsters. He made his NHL debut in the 2002–03 season with the Carolina Hurricanes, appearing in 41 games and recording two assists.

Malec played two more games with Carolina during the 2003–04 season, and was traded, along with a draft pick, to the Mighty Ducks of Anaheim after the season in exchange for goaltender Martin Gerber. During the 2004–05 NHL lockout, Malec played with Anaheim's AHL affiliate, the Cincinnati Mighty Ducks.

Malec joined the Ottawa Senators organization for the 2005–06 season, playing in two NHL games with the Senators and spending the rest of the season with the AHL's Binghamton Senators. During the 2006–07 season, he was traded to the New York Islanders in exchange for Matt Koalska. He played for their AHL affiliate the Bridgeport Sound Tigers but never played for the Islanders. In 2007, he moved to the Czech Extraliga, signing with HC Oceláři Třinec.

In his NHL career, Malec has appeared in 46 games and tallied two assists.

== Career statistics ==
=== Regular season and playoffs ===
			Regular season					Playoffs
Season	Team	League	GP	G	A	Pts	PIM	GP	G	A	Pts	PIM
1996–97	HK 36 Skalica	SVK U18	47	4	8	12	50	—	—	—	—	—
1997–98	HK 36 Skalica	SVK U18	54	12	36	48	92	—	—	—	—	—
1998–99	HK 36 Skalica	SVK U18	41	12	24	36	60	—	—	—	—	—
1999–2000	HK 36 Skalica	SVK U20	43	6	5	11	150	—	—	—	—	—
2000–01	Rimouski Océanic	QMJHL	64	13	50	63	198	11	0	11	11	26
2001–02	Rimouski Océanic	QMJHL	51	14	32	46	164	7	3	1	4	10
2001–02	Lowell Lock Monsters	AHL	—	—	—	—	—	4	0	0	0	4
2002–03	Carolina Hurricanes	NHL	41	0	2	2	43	—	—	—	—	—
2002–03	Lowell Lock Monsters	AHL	30	0	4	4	50	—	—	—	—	—
2003–04	Lowell Lock Monsters	AHL	74	7	13	20	101	—	—	—	—	—
2003–04	Carolina Hurricanes	NHL	2	0	0	0	2	—	—	—	—	—
2004–05	Cincinnati Mighty Ducks	AHL	66	4	14	18	104	6	0	2	2	10
2005–06	Binghamton Senators	AHL	79	1	27	28	118	—	—	—	—	—
2005–06	Ottawa Senators	NHL	2	0	0	0	2	—	—	—	—	—
2006–07	Binghamton Senators	AHL	33	1	12	13	35	—	—	—	—	—
2006–07	Ottawa Senators	NHL	1	0	0	0	0	—	—	—	—	—
2006–07	Bridgeport Sound Tigers	AHL	43	2	7	9	44	—	—	—	—	—
2007–08	HC Oceláři Třinec	ELH	52	5	4	9	88	8	0	0	0	37
2008–09	HC Oceláři Třinec	ELH	51	3	15	18	121	5	0	1	1	18
2009–10	HC Oceláři Třinec	ELH	52	4	15	19	60	5	1	1	2	30
2010–11	HC Kometa Brno	ELH	50	3	6	9	62	—	—	—	—	—
2011–12	HC Kometa Brno	ELH	52	0	6	6	68	20	1	5	6	44
2012–13	HC Kometa Brno	ELH	48	3	6	9	52	—	—	—	—	—
2013–14	Piráti Chomutov	ELH	30	1	4	5	67	—	—	—	—	—
2014–15	HC Kometa Brno	ELH	27	0	1	1	22	12	2	2	4	10
2014–15	HC Vítkovice Ridera	ELH	20	0	5	5	10	—	—	—	—	—
2015–16	HC Kometa Brno	ELH	51	0	3	3	68	4	0	1	1	31
2016–17	HC Kometa Brno	ELH	51	0	5	5	68	14	1	0	1	22
2017–18	HC Kometa Brno	ELH	42	2	4	6	44	14	0	1	1	34
2018–19	HC Kometa Brno	ELH	48	5	2	7	40	10	0	1	1	14
2019–20	HC Kometa Brno	ELH	37	0	2	2	32	—	—	—	—	—
2021–22	HC Kometa Brno B	CZE.3	16	2	5	7	29	—	—	—	—	—
AHL totals			325	15	77	92	452	10	0	2	2	14
NHL totals			46	0	2	2	47	—	—	—	—	—
ELH totals			611	26	78	104	802	92	5	12	17	242

=== International ===
Year	Team	Event	Result	GP	G	A	Pts	PIM
2000	Slovakia	WJC18	5th	6	0	2	2	8
2001	Slovakia	WJC	8th	7	0	0	0	2
2002	Slovakia	WJC	8th	7	1	0	1	4
Junior totals				20	1	2	3	14

== Awards and honours ==
Award	Year
QMJHL
Raymond Lagacé Trophy (defensive rookie of the year)	2001
All-Rookie Team	2001
CHL All-Rookie Team	2001
AHL
All-Star Game	2003

Awards and achievements
Preceded by Kirill Safronov	Winner of the Raymond Lagacé Trophy; 2000–01	Succeeded by Jeff Drouin-Deslauriers
