= Mirko Murovic =

Canadian ice hockey player

- Born: February 2, 1981 (age 45) Montreal, Quebec, Canada
- Height: 6 ft 3 in (191 cm)
- Weight: 201 lb (91 kg; 14 st 5 lb)
- Position: Left wing
- Shot: Left
- Played for: HC Lugano; SCL Tigers; EHC Chur; GCK Lions; ZSC Lions; HC Ambrì-Piotta
- NHL draft: 108th overall, 1999; Toronto Maple Leafs
- Playing career: 2001–2012

Mirko Murovic (born February 2, 1981) is a Canadian former professional ice hockey left winger. He was born in Montreal, Quebec, Canada, to a Slovenian father and a Swiss mother, and is of Croatian ancestry.

He played junior hockey in the Quebec Major Junior Hockey League for the Moncton Wildcats and the Acadie-Bathurst Titan, and was drafted 108th overall by the Toronto Maple Leafs in the 1999 NHL entry draft. Beginning in 2001, he spent his entire professional career in Switzerland, playing in the Nationalliga A for HC Lugano, SCL Tigers, ZSC Lions and HC Ambrì-Piotta. He retired in 2012.

== Career statistics ==
			Regular season					Playoffs
Season	Team	League	GP	G	A	Pts	PIM	GP	G	A	Pts	PIM
1996–97	Gatineau L'Intrepide	QMAAA	37	5	12	17	12	5	1	0	1	—
1997–98	Moncton Wildcats	QMJHL	54	10	15	25	10	—	—	—	—	—
1998–99	Moncton Wildcats	QMJHL	69	21	33	54	60	4	0	1	1	2
1999–00	Moncton Wildcats	QMJHL	72	19	51	70	113	7	2	4	6	20
2000–01	Acadie-Bathurst Titan	QMJHL	54	20	39	59	50	19	9	11	20	8
2001–02	HC Lugano	NLA	21	0	3	3	8	13	0	1	1	8
2001–02	SC Langnau	NLA	9	0	0	0	0	—	—	—	—	—
2002–03	HC Lugano	NLA	35	3	3	6	22	15	0	4	4	8
2003–04	SC Langnau	NLA	48	12	20	32	47	—	—	—	—	—
2004–05	SC Langnau	NLA	44	7	12	19	34	—	—	—	—	—
2005–06	HC Lugano	NLA	23	2	1	3	16	16	0	3	3	6
2006–07	HC Lugano	NLA	24	3	1	4	10	6	0	1	1	4
2006–07	EHC Chur	NLB	8	2	2	4	8	—	—	—	—	—
2007–08	GC Küsnacht Lions	NLB	—	—	—	—	—	—	—	—	—	—
2007–08	ZSC Lions	NLA	7	0	0	0	4	17	0	0	0	6
2008–09	HC Ambrì-Piotta	NLA	35	6	3	9	47	—	—	—	—	—
2009–10	HC Ambrì-Piotta	NLA	49	12	9	21	28	—	—	—	—	—
2010–11	HC Ambrì-Piotta	NLA	9	1	1	2	6	—	—	—	—	—
2011–12	HC Ambrì-Piotta	NLA	20	0	1	1	10	—	—	—	—	—
NLA totals			324	46	54	100	242	67	0	9	9	32
