= Claude Bouchard =

Canadian researcher

Claude Bouchard CM CQ
- Born: 1939 (age 86–87); Quebec City, Quebec, Canada
- Citizenship: Canada (by birth); USA (since 2012)
- Education: Université Laval (B.Ped. 1962); University of Oregon (M.Sc. 1963); University of Texas at Austin (Ph.D. 1977)
- Known for: Obesity; Exercise science
- Awards: LSU Boyd Professor (2016); Officer Order of Leopold II (Belgium, 1993); Foreign Member Royal Academy of Medicine of Belgium (1996); Order of Canada (2001); IOC Sport Science Award (2001); Ordre National du Québec (2005)
- Scientific career
- Fields: Physiology
- Workplaces: Pennington Biomedical Research Center, Louisiana State University; Université Laval, Québec, Canada
- Thesis: Univariate and Multivariate Genetic Analysis of Anthropometric and Physique Characteristics of French Canadian Families (1977)

Claude Bouchard CM CQ (born 1939 in Lévis, Québec, Canada) Canadian-American exercise physiologist and geneticist. He is professor and the John W. Barton, Sr. Endowed Chair in Genetics and Nutrition at Louisiana State University's Pennington Biomedical Research Center (PBRC), where he is also the director of the Human Genomics Laboratory. He is known for his research on the role of genetics in obesity and in the process of adaptation to regular physical activity. He was president of the Obesity Society in 1991–92.

== Education ==
Born in 1939 in Quebec City, Quebec, Canada, Bouchard graduated from Laval University with a B.P.Ed degree in 1962. He received his M.Sc. in exercise physiology from the University of Oregon the following year before doing postgraduate work at the University of Cologne and the German Sport University Cologne in Germany for two years (1963–65). In 1977, he received his Ph.D. from the University of Texas at Austin, after which he completed his postdoc at the University of Montreal in the same year.

== Career ==
Bouchard’s academic career began at Universite Laval, where he progressed from Assistant Professor (1965) to Professor of Exercise Physiology (1979–97). At Laval, he directed the Physical Activity Sciences Laboratory and its Exercise Biology Research Group (1977–99). From 1997 to 1999, he held the Donald B. Brown Research Chair on Obesity, funded by the Medical Research Council of Canada and Roche Canada. In 2001, he was appointed Professor Emeritus in the School of Medicine at Laval University. In 1999, after teaching kinesiology at Laval University for over thirty years, he joined the faculty of the Pennington Biomedical Research Center, where he was the executive director and George A. Bray Chair in Nutrition until 2010. From 2010 to 2022, he continued as Professor and Director of the Human genomics laboratopry while holding the John W. Barton, Sr. Endowed Chair in Genetics and Nutrition. In 2016, the LSU Board of Supervisors named him LSU’s seventy-third Boyd Professor, the highest professorial honor in the LSU system, and in 2022 he was designated Boyd Professor Emeritus following his retirement from active faculty status. Bouchard is known for his research on the role of genetics in obesity and in the process of adaptation to regular physical activity. He was president of the Obesity Society in 1991–92 and of the World Obesity Federation from 2002 to 2006.

His published work comprises more than 1,000 scientific papers and 35 books, cited more than 200,000 times on Google Scholar, with an h-index of 203.

== Research ==
Bouchard’s research has focused on the genetics of obesity and its comorbidities, the genetics of adaptation to regular exercise, and the molecular predictors of response to endurance exercise training. He has led large-scale multi-center studies including the Québec Family Study, GENATHLETE and the HERITAGE Family Study, which examined the role of genetic factors in cardiovascular and metabolic responses to endurance exercise training. Most of his contributions to science can be grouped under five topics.

=== Genetics of obesity and adipose tissue distribution ===
Bouchard's laboratory was the first to investigate whether there was a genetic component to the risk of obesity and the pattern of fat distribution using direct measurements of adiposity, including visceral fat depot, in relatives by descent and by adoption from the Québec Family Study, a study he established in 1978. The studies showed moderate heritability (35–50%) for body mass, adipose tissue mass, and lean body mass, with a stronger genetic component (45–60%) for the subcutaneous fat deposition profile and abdominal visceral fat level. Subsequent work explored genetic pleiotropism among BMI, coronary heart disease, and common CVD risk factors based on GWAS meta-analyses, and examined convergence between biological, behavioral, and genetic determinants of obesity.

=== Genetics of response to overfeeding and negative energy balance ===
In a series of studies with pairs of monozygotic twins, Bouchard demonstrated that the response to standardized caloric surplus or deficit varies among adults, with at least a 3-fold range between low and high gainers in response to long-term overfeeding, and a similar range for weight loss in response to negative energy balance. Identical twin brothers were significantly more similar in responsiveness than biologically non-related individuals. These studies provided evidence for the presence of a genetic component to human variation in metabolic responsiveness to experimental alterations in energy balance conditions.

=== Effects of bariatric surgery on morbidity and mortality ===
Bouchard was part of the team funded by the Swedish Medical Research Council that conducted the Swedish Obese Subjects study, led by Professor Lars Sjöström. The study enrolled 2,010 obese subjects in a surgical group matched on 18 variables with 2,037 obese controls, with an average follow-up exceeding 25 years. The SOS study reported that bariatric surgery for severe obesity is associated with significant long-term weight loss, decreased all-cause mortality, reduced cardiovascular events, prevention of type 2 diabetes, and more frequent diabetes remission compared to usual care.

=== Genetics of response to exercise training ===
In the early 1980s, Bouchard and colleagues demonstrated for the first time that there were considerable inter-individual differences in changes in cardiorespiratory fitness in response to standardized exercise programs, with a 3-to-10-fold range between the lowest and highest gainers. Through twin and family studies, including the HERITAGE Family Study, he showed that the variability in responsiveness to an exercise training dose was characterized by a genetic component accounting for about 50% of the response variance. He subsequently demonstrated that a minority of individuals experience potentially adverse changes in one or a few common risk factors for metabolic diseases even though they improve their overall fitness and reduced their global risk factor profile when exposed to regular endurance exercise.

=== Genes, pathways, and networks driving exercise response ===
Over the last 25 years, Bouchard has investigated the contribution of DNA sequence variants to human variation in response to regular exercise, progressing from classical candidate gene studies to genome-wide linkage and association analyses, combined with gene-expression profiling and other omics explorations. These efforts identified gene targets contributing to variability in cardiorespiratory fitness trainability and exercise-induced changes in insulin sensitivity, plasma lipids, and resting and exercise blood pressure. Pathway and network analyses revealed enrichment in metabolic genes related to energy flow, developmental pathways, angiogenesis, and regulation of cell death. A plasma protein abundance profile of approximately 100 proteins was found to be strongly associated with cardiorespiratory fitness. However, using the resources of the HERITAGE Family Study and GENATHLETE, the efforts to identify a genomic profile predicting intrinsic or acquired indicators of cardiorespiratory fitness have not been successful yet.

== Selected publications ==
The following publications are among Bouchard's most impactful contributions:

=== Adiposity and obesity ===
- Bouchard C, Pérusse L, Leblanc C, Tremblay A, Thériault G (1988). "Inheritance of the amount and distribution of human body fat". International Journal of Obesity. 12 (3): 205–215. PMID 3391737.
- Bouchard C, Tremblay A, Després JP, et al. (1990). "The response to long-term overfeeding in identical twins". The New England Journal of Medicine. 322 (21): 1477–1482. doi:10.1056/NEJM199005243222101. PMID 2336074.
- Pérusse L, Després JP, Lemieux S, Rice T, Rao DC, Bouchard C (1996). "Familial aggregation of abdominal visceral fat level: results from the Quebec Family Study". Metabolism. 45 (3): 378–382. PMID 8606647.
- Sjöström L, Narbro K, Sjöström CD, et al. (2007). "Effects of bariatric surgery on mortality in Swedish obese subjects". The New England Journal of Medicine. 357 (8): 741–752. PMID 17715408.
- Bouchard, Claude; Katzmarzyk, Peter T., eds. (2010). Physical Activity and Obesity (2nd ed.). Champaign, IL: Human Kinetics. p. 408.
- Church TS, Thomas DM, Tudor-Locke C, et al. (2011). "Trends over 5 decades in U.S. occupation-related physical activity and their associations with obesity". PLoS ONE. 6 (5): e19657. doi:10.1371/journal.pone.0019657. PMC 3102055.
- Sjöström L, Peltonen M, Jacobson P, et al. (2012). "Bariatric surgery and long-term cardiovascular events". JAMA. 307 (1): 56–65. PMID 22215166.
- Carlsson LM, Peltonen M, Ahlin S, et al. (2012). "Bariatric surgery and prevention of type 2 diabetes in Swedish obese subjects". The New England Journal of Medicine. 367 (8): 695–704. PMID 22913680.
- Chaput JP, Pérusse L, Després JP, Tremblay A, Bouchard C (2014). "Findings from the Quebec Family Study on the etiology of obesity: genetics and environmental highlights". Current Obesity Reports. 3 (1): 54–66.
- Ghosh S, Bouchard C (2017). "Convergence between biological, behavioural and genetic determinants of obesity". Nature Reviews Genetics. 18 (12): 731–748. PMID 28989171.
- Bray GA, Bouchard C (2020). "The biology of human overfeeding: a systematic review". Obesity Reviews. 21 (9): e13040.
- Bouchard C (2021). "Genetics of obesity: what we have learned over decades of research". Obesity. 29 (5): 802–820.
- Bray, George A.; Bouchard, Claude, eds. (2024). Handbook of Obesity. Vol. 1: Epidemiology, Etiology and Physiopathology (4th ed.), Volume 2: Clinical Applications (5th ed.). CRC Press. pp. 637, 518.

=== Exercise biology ===
- Bouchard C, Tremblay A, Després JP, et al. (1994). "The response to exercise with constant energy intake in identical twins". Obesity Research. 2 (5): 400–410. PMID 16358397.
- Bouchard, Claude; Shephard, Roy J.; Stephens, Thomas, eds. (1994). Physical Activity, Fitness, and Health: International Proceedings and Consensus Statement. Champaign, IL: Human Kinetics. p. 1055.
- Simoneau JA, Bouchard C (1995). "Genetic determinism of fiber type proportion in human skeletal muscle". The FASEB Journal. 9 (11): 1091–1095.
- Bouchard C, An P, Rice T, et al. (1999). "Familial aggregation of VO_{2}max response to exercise training: results from the HERITAGE Family Study". Journal of Applied Physiology. 87 (3): 1003–1008. PMID 10484570.
- Malina, Robert M.; Bouchard, Claude; Bar-Or, Oded (2004). Growth, Maturation and Physical Activity (2nd ed.). Champaign, IL: Human Kinetics. p. 712.
- Katzmarzyk PT, Church TS, Craig CL, Bouchard C (2009). "Sitting time and mortality from all causes, cardiovascular disease, and cancer". Medicine & Science in Sports & Exercise. 41 (5): 998–1005.
- Bouchard, Claude; Blair, Steven N.; Haskell, William L., eds. (2012). Physical Activity and Health. Champaign, IL: Human Kinetics. p. 441.
- Bouchard C, Blair SN, Church TS, et al. (2012). "Adverse metabolic response to regular exercise: is it a rare or common occurrence?". PLoS ONE. 7 (5): e37887. PMID 22666405.
- Bouchard C, Blair SN, Katzmarzyk PT (2015). "Less sitting, more physical activity, or higher fitness?". Mayo Clinic Proceedings. 90 (11): 1533–1540.
- Rankinen T, Fuku N, Wolfarth B, et al. (2016). "No evidence of a common DNA variant profile specific to world class endurance athletes". PLoS ONE. 11 (1): e0147330.
- Sarzynski MA, Rice TK, Després JP, et al. (2022). "The HERITAGE Family Study: a review of the effects of exercise training on cardiometabolic health, with insights into molecular transducers". Medicine & Science in Sports & Exercise. 54 (5S): S1–S43.
- Hota M, et al. (2023). "Omics-driven investigation of the biology underlying intrinsic submaximal working capacity and its trainability". Physiological Genomics. 55 (11): 517–543.

== Awards and honors ==
- 1969: Max Bürger Prize, German Medical Society for Gerontology (shared with Wildor Hollmann)
- 1972: Méritas Award, Association des professionnels de l'activité physique du Québec
- 1974: Prize for La Préparation d'un Champion (edited with J. Brunelle and P. Godbout), shared among the Sports Confederation of Québec, the Sports and Recreation Department of the City of Montreal, the Organizing Committee of the 1976 Montreal Olympic Games, and the Conseil supérieur du livre and the Bibliothèque nationale du Québec
- 1974: Medal of Excellence from the Minister of Youth, Leisure and Sports, Government of Québec
- 1978: J.A. Samaranch Prize, International Association of Higher Schools of Physical Education (for La Préparation d'un Champion)
- 1985: President, Canadian Association of Sport Sciences
- 1988: Honor Award, Canadian Association of Sport Sciences
- 1991: President, North American Association for the Study of Obesity (now The Obesity Society)
- 1992: Citation Award, American College of Sports Medicine
- 1993: Officer of the Order of Leopold II, Belgium
- 1993: Benjamin Delessert Award in nutrition, France
- 1994: Willendorf Award, International Association for the Study of Obesity
- 1996: Knight of the Order of the Horse Collar, University of Kuopio, Finland
- 1996: Foreign Member, Royal Academy of Medicine of Belgium
- 1996: Sandoz Award, Canadian Atherosclerosis Society
- 1997: Albert Creff Prize, National Academy of Medicine, Paris (co-recipient A. Tremblay)
- 1998: Honorary Member, German Federation of Sports Medicine
- 1998: Medal from the Rektor of the Deutsche Sporthochschule Köln on the 40th anniversary of the Institut für Kreislaufforschung und Sportmedizin, Cologne, Germany
- 1998: TOPS Award, North American Association for the Study of Obesity (now The Obesity Society)
- 1999: Weight Watchers Foundation W. Henry Sebrell, Jr. Award
- 2001: Member of the Order of Canada
- 2001: Sport Science Award of the International Olympic Committee President to the HERITAGE Family Study Principal Investigators: Claude Bouchard, Arthur S. Leon, D. C. Rao, James S. Skinner and Jack H. Wilmore
- 2002: Honor Award, American College of Sports Medicine
- 2002: President, International Association for the Study of Obesity (now the World Obesity Federation), 2002–2006
- 2003: Alumnus of the Year (Gloire de l'Escolle), Université Laval alumni association
- 2004: Albert Stunkard Award, NAASO (now The Obesity Society)
- 2005: Knight (Chevalier) of the Ordre national du Québec
- 2005: Earle W. Crampton Award in Nutrition, McGill University
- 2008: George A. Bray Founders Award, The Obesity Society
- 2011: E.V. McCollum Award, American Society for Nutrition
- 2016: Boyd Professor, Louisiana State University, Pennington Biomedical Research Center (73rd Boyd Professor)
- 2022: Boyd Professor Emeritus, Louisiana State University, Pennington Biomedical Research Center

=== Fellowships ===
- 1980: Fellow, American College of Sports Medicine (FACSM)
- 1985: Foreign Fellow, National Academy of Kinesiology
- 1998: Fellow, American Epidemiological Society
- 2007: Fellow, American Society for Nutrition
- 2009: Fellow, American Association for the Advancement of Science
- 2010: Fellow, American Heart Association
- 2014: Fellow, The Obesity Society
- 2018: Fellow, Canadian Society for Exercise Physiology

=== Honorary doctorates ===
- 1998: Katholieke Universiteit Leuven, Belgium
- 2009: University of South Carolina, USA
- 2011: University of Guelph, Canada
- 2011: Brock University, Canada
- 2012: University of Ottawa, Canada
- 2015: National and Kapodistrian University of Athens, Greece
- 2015: Université Laval, Québec, Canada
