= Marc-André Thinel =

Canadian ice hockey player

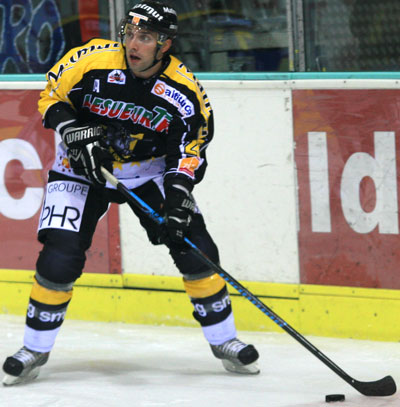
- Born: March 24, 1981 (age 45) Saint-Jérôme, Quebec, Canada
- Height: 6 ft 0 in (183 cm)
- Weight: 179 lb (81 kg; 12 st 11 lb)
- Position: Left wing
- Shoots: Left
- Ligue Magnus team Former teams: Dragons de Rouen; Quebec Citadelles; Lexington Men O' War; Utah Grizzlies; Columbus Cottonmouths; Hamilton Bulldogs
- NHL draft: 145th overall, 1999; Montreal Canadiens
- Playing career: 2001–present

Marc-André Thinel (born March 24, 1981) is a Canadian former professional ice hockey winger who last played for Dragons de Rouen in the Ligue Magnus, and served as the team's captain. He was drafted 145th overall by the Montreal Canadiens in the 1999 NHL entry draft.

His twin brother Sébastien was also a professional hockey player; they were teammates for three years they were teammates as juniors at Victoriaville Tigres, and during the 2006–07 season at Rouen.
