= Simon Gamache =

Canadian ice hockey player (born 1981)

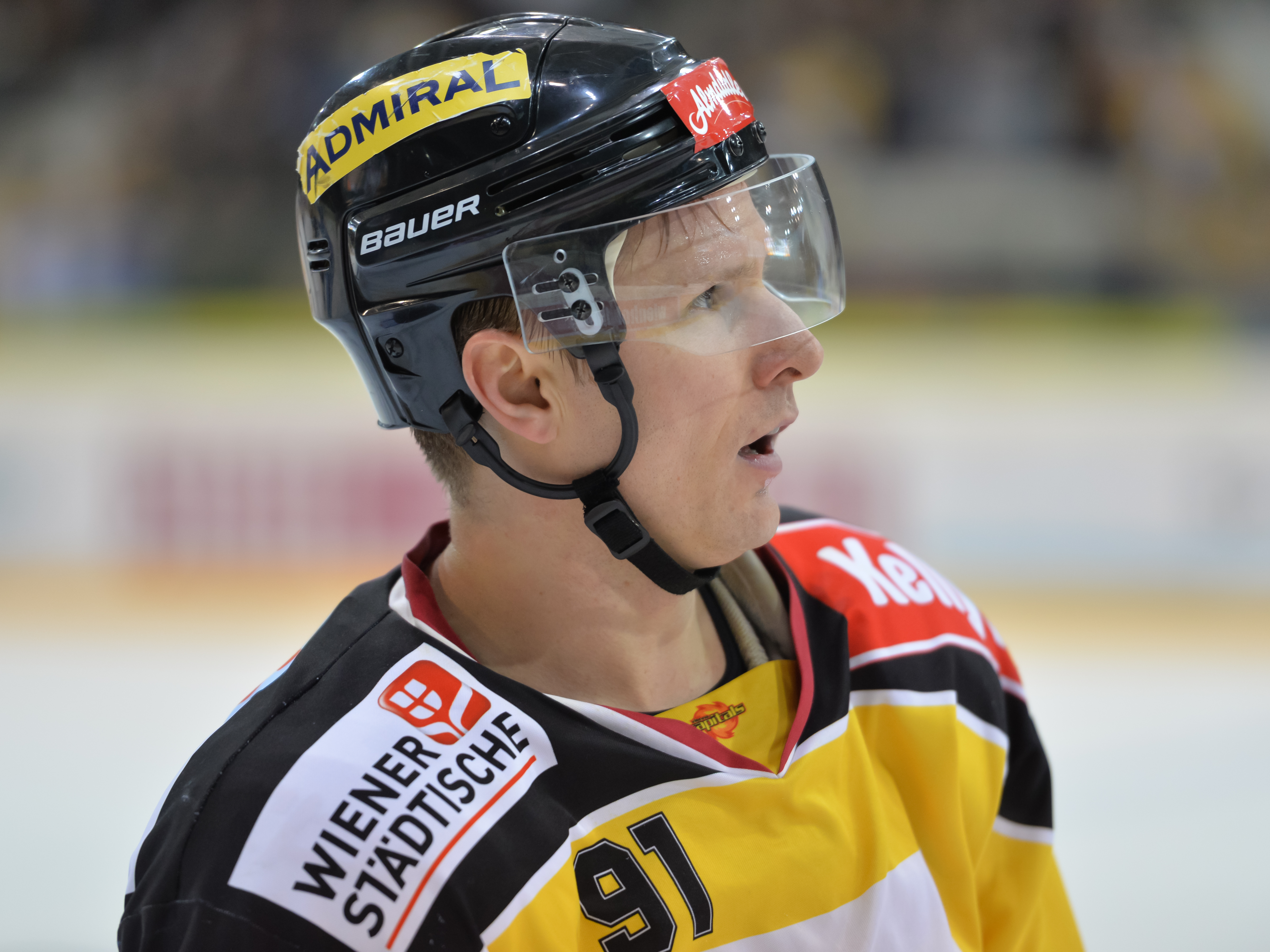
- Gamache with the Vienna Capitals in 2016
- Born: January 3, 1981 (age 45) Thetford Mines, Quebec, Canada
- Height: 5 ft 10 in (178 cm)
- Weight: 185 lb (84 kg; 13 st 3 lb)
- Position: Left wing
- Shot: Left
- Played for: Atlanta Thrashers; Nashville Predators; St. Louis Blues; Toronto Maple Leafs; SC Bern; Fribourg-Gottéron; Adler Mannheim; Vålerenga; Vienna Capitals
- NHL draft: 290th overall, 2000; Atlanta Thrashers
- Playing career: 2001–2017

Simon Gamache (born January 3, 1981) is a Canadian former professional ice hockey player who played in the National Hockey League (NHL).

== Playing career ==
As a youth, Gamache played in the 1995 Quebec International Pee-Wee Hockey Tournament with a minor ice hockey team from Beauce, Quebec.

Gamache played his junior career with the Val-d'Or Foreurs of the Quebec Major Junior Hockey League (QMJHL) in which he won multiple awards including the Ed Chynoweth Trophy, Jean Béliveau Trophy, CHL Player of the Year, Michel Brière Memorial Trophy, CHL Top Scorer Award, CHL Humanitarian of the Year, and Guy Lafleur Trophy.

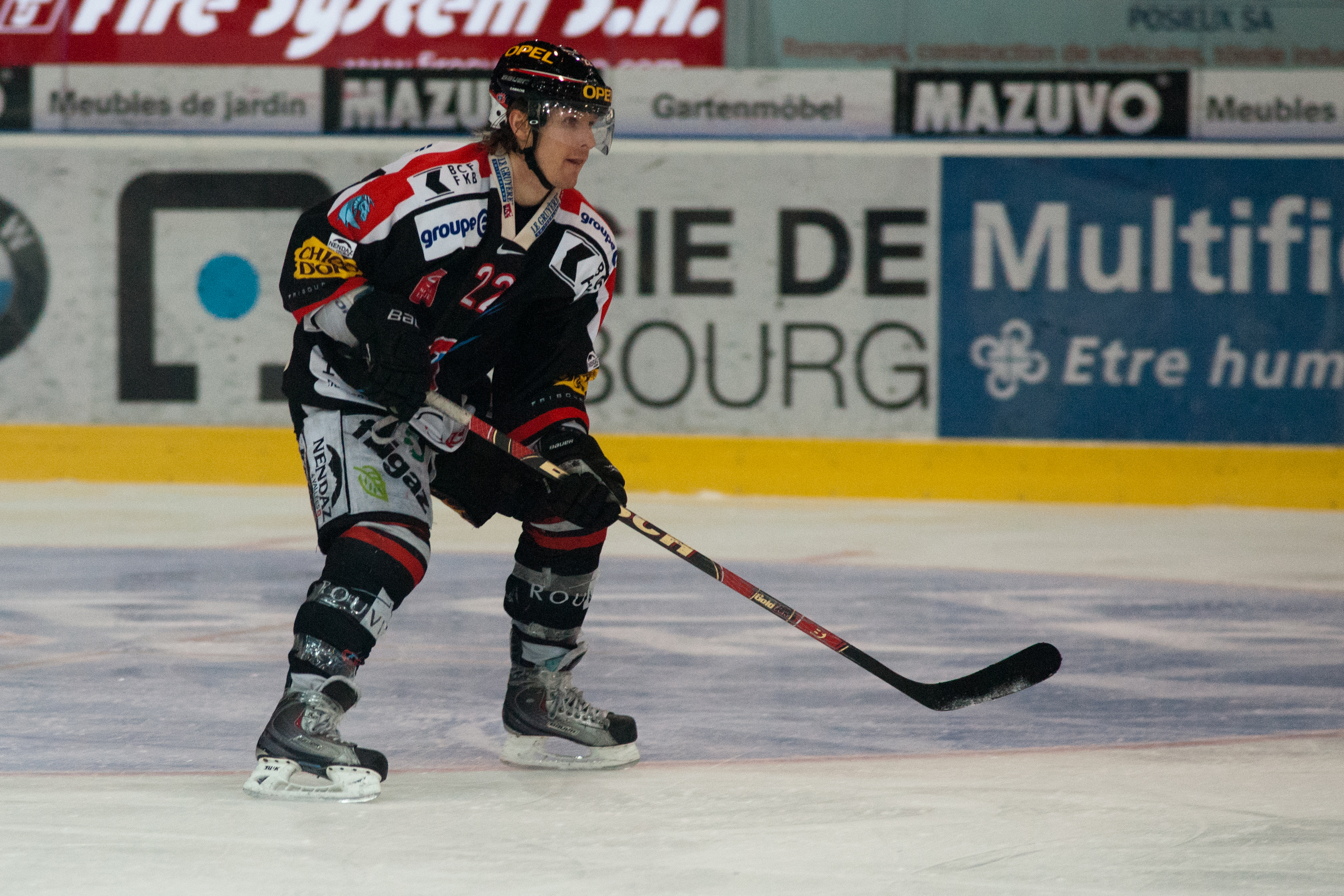

Gamache was drafted 290th overall, following his second season in the QMJHL, by the Atlanta Thrashers of the National Hockey League (NHL). Following his third season of junior, he moved up to professional hockey with Atlanta's American Hockey League (AHL) team, the Chicago Wolves.

During his NHL career, he has played for the Atlanta Thrashers, Nashville Predators, St. Louis Blues, and Toronto Maple Leafs. He played for the Milwaukee Admirals AHL in the 2005–2006 season. In the 2006–2007 season, Gamache was playing in the Swiss League for SC Bern. For the 2007–08 season, Gamache signed with the Toronto Maple Leafs. On October 2, 2007, Gamache was assigned to the Toronto Maple Leafs top affiliate, the Toronto Marlies of the AHL.

On January 5, 2008 the Maple Leafs put Gamache on waivers. A few days later, Gamache returned to SC Bern, completing the rest of the Swiss season and playing the next 3 seasons with the team. On April 24, 2010, as part of the SC Bern team, he won the Swiss League championship. Gamache was placed on loan from to the NLA's Fribourg-Gottéron team at the start of the 2010–11 season.

On February 7, 2011, Gamache signed a two-year extension with Fribourg-Gottéron, placing him under contract with the team until 2012–13. Gamache's contract was not extended with Fribourg-Gottéron at the conclusion of the season. Instead, Gamache signed with the Manheim Eagles of the Deutsche Eishockey Liga on September 26, 2013.

== Career statistics ==
| | | | Regular season | | | | | Playoffs |
| Season | Team | League | GP | G | A | Pts | PIM | GP | G | A | Pts | PIM |
|---|---|---|---|---|---|---|---|---|---|---|---|---|
| 1997–98 | Lévis Commandeurs | QMAAA | 42 | 28 | 26 | 54 | 16 | 4 | 1 | 1 | 2 |
| 1998–99 | Val–d'Or Foreurs | QMJHL | 70 | 19 | 43 | 62 | 54 | 6 | 1 | 2 | 3 | 4 |
| 1999–2000 | Val–d'Or Foreurs | QMJHL | 72 | 64 | 79 | 143 | 74 | — | — | — | — | — |
| 2000–01 | Val–d'Or Foreurs | QMJHL | 72 | 74 | 110 | 184 | 70 | 21 | 22 | 35 | 57 | 18 |
| 2000–01 | Val–d'Or Foreurs | MC | — | — | — | — | — | 5 | 4 | 3 | 7 | 8 |
| 2001–02 | Chicago Wolves | AHL | 24 | 2 | 4 | 6 | 11 | — | — | — | — | — |
| 2001–02 | Greenville Grrrowl | ECHL | 31 | 19 | 19 | 38 | 35 | 17 | 15 | 9 | 24 | 22 |
| 2002–03 | Chicago Wolves | AHL | 76 | 35 | 42 | 77 | 37 | 9 | 7 | 2 | 9 | 4 |
| 2002–03 | Atlanta Thrashers | NHL | 2 | 0 | 0 | 0 | 2 | — | — | — | — | — |
| 2003–04 | Chicago Wolves | AHL | 16 | 5 | 6 | 11 | 4 | — | — | — | — | — |
| 2003–04 | Atlanta Thrashers | NHL | 2 | 0 | 1 | 1 | 0 | — | — | — | — | — |
| 2003–04 | Milwaukee Admirals | AHL | 52 | 18 | 27 | 45 | 26 | 22 | 6 | 18 | 24 | 14 |
| 2003–04 | Nashville Predators | NHL | 7 | 1 | 0 | 1 | 0 | — | — | — | — | — |
| 2004–05 | Milwaukee Admirals | AHL | 80 | 29 | 57 | 86 | 93 | 7 | 6 | 4 | 10 | 18 |
| 2005–06 | Nashville Predators | NHL | 11 | 0 | 0 | 0 | 0 | — | — | — | — | — |
| 2005–06 | Milwaukee Admirals | AHL | 39 | 18 | 18 | 36 | 46 | 21 | 12 | 16 | 28 | 22 |
| 2005–06 | St. Louis Blues | NHL | 15 | 3 | 4 | 7 | 10 | — | — | — | — | — |
| 2006–07 | SC Bern | NLA | 44 | 20 | 46 | 66 | 40 | 16 | 7 | 9 | 16 | 10 |
| 2007–08 | Toronto Maple Leafs | NHL | 11 | 2 | 2 | 4 | 6 | — | — | — | — | — |
| 2007–08 | Toronto Marlies | AHL | 17 | 4 | 3 | 7 | 10 | — | — | — | — | — |
| 2007–08 | SC Bern | NLA | 13 | 3 | 14 | 17 | 4 | 4 | 0 | 1 | 1 | 2 |
| 2008–09 | SC Bern | NLA | 48 | 19 | 35 | 54 | 55 | 4 | 0 | 1 | 1 | 39 |
| 2009–10 | SC Bern | NLA | 30 | 9 | 13 | 22 | 16 | 10 | 6 | 4 | 10 | 8 |
| 2010–11 | HC Fribourg–Gottéron | NLA | 6 | 4 | 7 | 11 | 8 | — | — | — | — | — |
| 2010–11 | SC Bern | NLA | 26 | 7 | 18 | 25 | 16 | 7 | 4 | 2 | 6 | 8 |
| 2011–12 | HC Fribourg–Gottéron | NLA | 50 | 20 | 25 | 45 | 42 | 11 | 4 | 2 | 6 | 8 |
| 2012–13 | HC Fribourg–Gottéron | NLA | 45 | 15 | 23 | 38 | 32 | 18 | 10 | 4 | 14 | 4 |
| 2013–14 | Adler Mannheim | DEL | 46 | 10 | 23 | 33 | 18 | 5 | 1 | 2 | 3 | 2 |
| 2014–15 | Thetford Mines Isothermic | LNAH | 13 | 5 | 12 | 17 | 14 | — | — | — | — | — |
| 2014–15 | Vålerenga | GET | 19 | 8 | 16 | 24 | 10 | 10 | 5 | 7 | 12 | 6 |
| 2015–16 | Vienna Capitals | EBEL | 54 | 19 | 24 | 43 | 34 | 5 | 0 | 3 | 3 | 6 |
| 2016–17 | Thetford Mines Isothermic | LNAH | 34 | 10 | 20 | 30 | 18 | — | — | — | — | — |
| AHL totals | | | 306 | 111 | 157 | 268 | 227 | 59 | 31 | 40 | 71 | 58 |
| NHL totals | | | 48 | 6 | 7 | 13 | 18 | — | — | — | — | — |
| NLA totals | | | 262 | 97 | 181 | 278 | 213 | 70 | 31 | 23 | 54 | 79 |

Awards and achievements
| Preceded by Brad Richards | CHL Player of the Year; 2001 | Succeeded by Pierre-Marc Bouchard |
