= Centre Agnico Eagle =

Ice hockey arena in Quebec, Canada

Centre Val-d'Or (Centre Agnico Eagle)
- Palais des Sports
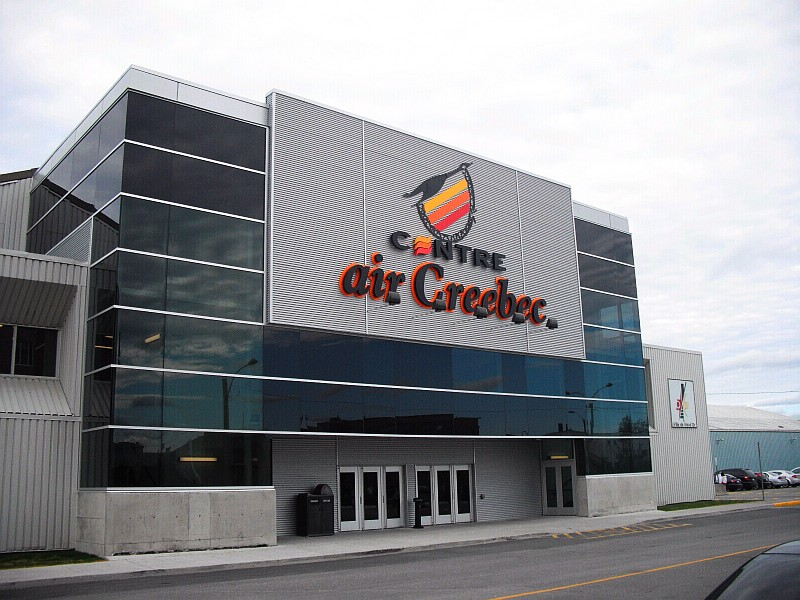

- Location within Quebec Location within Canada
- Full name: Centre Agnico Eagle
- Former names: Palais des Sports (1949-2005) Centre Air Creebec (2005-2021)
- Address: 810 6e Avenue
- Location: Val-d'Or, Quebec
- Coordinates: 48°06′19″N 77°47′07″W
- Capacity: 3,504 (2,140 seated)
- Executive suites: c. 18-20
- Record attendance: 3,504

Construction
- Groundbreaking: 1948
- Built: 1949
- Renovated: 2001
- Expanded: 2000
- Cost: $990,000

Tenant
- Val-d'Or Foreurs (QMJHL) (1993–present)

The Centre Agnico Eagle, formerly known as the Centre Air Creebec and Palais des Sports, is a 3,504 capacity (2,140 seated) multi-purpose arena in Val-d'Or, Quebec, Canada. It is home to the Val-d'Or Foreurs ice hockey team. It was built in 1949 and renamed for corporate sponsor Air Creebec in November 2005. The arena is known for its diagonal scoreboard which was added in 2008.

== Past events ==
In the past, the arena has hosted:

- 1998 - President's Cup (QMJHL) Final Vs Rimouski Océanic
- 2001 - President's Cup (QMJHL) Final Vs Acadie–Bathurst Titan
- 2007 - President's Cup (QMJHL) Final Vs Lewiston Maineiacs
- 2014 - President's Cup (QMJHL) Final Vs Baie-Comeau Drakkar
