= Miroslav Durak =

Slovak ice hockey player

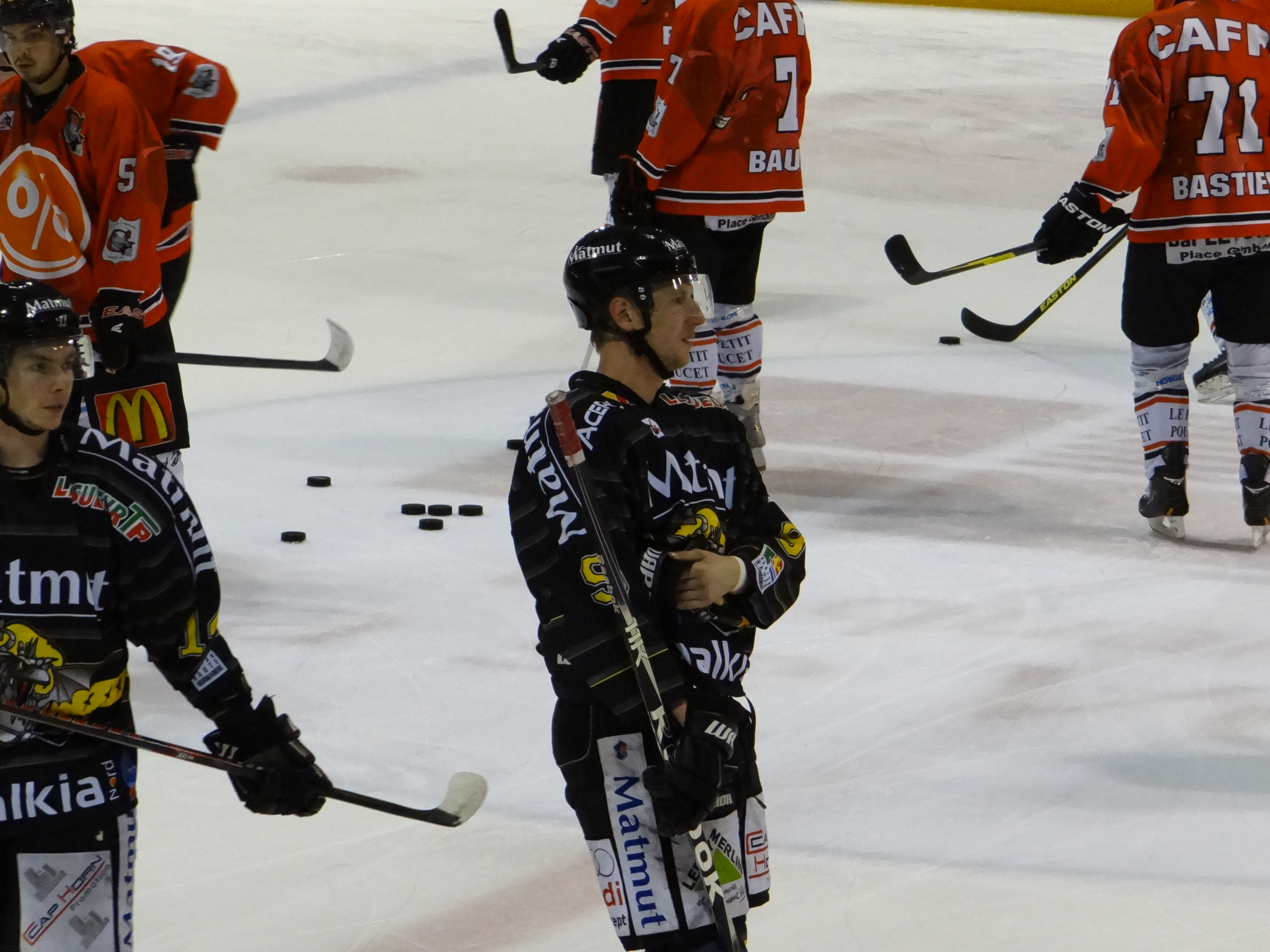
- Born: June 9, 1981 (age 44) Nitra, Czechoslovakia
- Height: 6 ft 4 in (193 cm)
- Weight: 195 lb (88 kg; 13 st 13 lb)
- Position: Defence
- Shot: Right
- Played for: HC Topoľčany; Milwaukee Admirals; Toledo Storm; České Budějovice; IHC Písek; HC Oceláři Třinec; HC Slovan Bratislava; HK Ružinov; HC Zlín; HK 36 Skalica; HK Nitra; Dragons de Rouen; GKS Tychy; MsHK Žilina; Újpesti TE; Dunaújvárosi Acélbikák; HK Dukla Michalovce
- National team: Slovakia
- NHL draft: 220th overall, 1999; Nashville Predators
- Playing career: 2002–2016

Miroslav Durak (born June 9, 1981) is a Slovak former professional ice hockey player.

Durak was drafted 220th overall by the Nashville Predators in the 1999 NHL entry draft. After his draft selection, he began to play junior in North America, beginning with the Des Moines Buccaneers in the United States Hockey League. He then moved to the Quebec Major Junior Hockey League where he played for the Sherbrooke Castors and the Acadie-Bathurst Titan. He then signed for the Predators organization in 2002, but spent the majority of his time in the ECHL for the Toledo Storm as well as one game in the American Hockey League for the Milwaukee Admirals. He departed after just one season in the organization and moved to the Czech Extraliga before moving back to his native Slovakia. He also had spells in France, Poland and Hungary.
