= Adam Russo =

Canadian-Italian ice hockey player

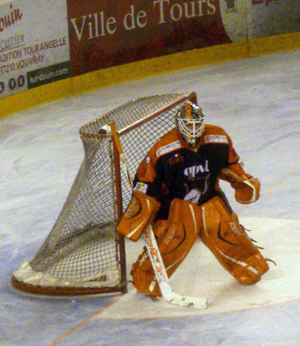
- Born: April 12, 1983 (age 43) Montreal, Quebec, Canada
- Height: 5 ft 10 in (178 cm)
- Weight: 190 lb (86 kg; 13 st 8 lb)
- Position: Goaltender
- Catches: left
- team Former teams: Free agent HC Asiago; Alleghe HC; Bolzano HC; Tours; SG Cortina
- National team: Italy
- Playing career: 2004–present

Adam Russo (born April 12, 1983) is an Italian-Canadian former professional ice hockey goaltender. He participated at the 2010 IIHF World Championship as a member of the Italian National men's ice hockey team.

== Playing career ==
Russo played major junior in the Quebec Major Junior Hockey League (QMJHL) with the Acadie-Bathurst Titan for four seasons. In his first season, he was named to the All-Rookie Team. In 2002–03, he tied Nick Sanza and Roberto Luongo for the league-record in single-season shutouts with seven. That same year, he won both the Jacques Plante trophy as best goaltender in the QMJHL and the CHL (Canadian Hockey League) Goaltender of the Year and was named to the First All-Star team at the Golden Puck Award banquet. He holds the career season/playoff record for shutouts with a total of 23. He turned pro in 2004–05 overseas in the Italian Serie A with Alleghe HC and Asiago HC. He went on to also play for HC Turin, HC Merano, and Bolzano HC, where he won championships both years, before joining the French Ligue Magnus in 2008–09 with Tours where he was named to the French All-Star team. In 2009–10, he returned to North America to play in the IHL with the Port Huron Icehawks. At the end of the season, he participated in the IIHF Ice Hockey World Championships in Germany, where he played against both Team Canada and Team Latvia in the preliminary round. He then played for the Quad City Mallards during the 2010-2011 where he picked up Goalie Of the Week mentions a couple of times, and repeated those honors the following season when he played for the Wichita Thunder. There, he was a finalist for the CHL Goaltender of the Year. He was traded to the Arizona Sundogs of the CHL for the 2012–13 season.

On a side note, after his rookie season, he attended the Montreal Canadiens rookie camp, but missed out on a contract, and the year after he received his CHL Goalie of the Year award, he attended the Mighty Ducks of Anaheim pro camp where he did very well, but again, was not offered a deal. Before his season in 2009–10 in Port Huron with the Icehawks, he also attended the Worcester Sharks training camp, the farm team of the San Jose Sharks.

Also, Russo owns A.R. Action-Reaction Goaltending, a goaltending consultant and coaching company based in Vancouver. He has been teaching and training goalies for 15+ years.
