= 2003–04 QMJHL season =

Canadian junior ice hockey season

- League: Quebec Major Junior Hockey League
- Sport: Hockey
- Duration: Regular season September 11, 2003 – March 14, 2004; Playoffs; March 19 – May 9, 2004
- Teams: 16

Draft
- Top draft pick: Sidney Crosby
- Picked by: Rimouski Océanic

Regular season
- Jean Rougeau Trophy: Gatineau Olympiques (4)
- Season MVP: Sidney Crosby (Rimouski Océanic)
- Top scorer: Sidney Crosby (Rimouski Océanic)

Playoffs
- Playoffs MVP: Maxime Talbot (Olympiques)
- Finals champions: Gatineau Olympiques (4)
- Runners-up: Moncton Wildcats

QMJHL seasons
- 2002–03 2004–05

2003–04 CHL season
- League: Canadian Hockey League
- Sport: Hockey
- Duration: OHL; September 17, 2003 – March 14, 2004; QMJHL; September 11, 2003 – March 14, 2004; WHL; September 19, 2003 – March 14, 2004
- Teams: 60
- Season MVP: Sidney Crosby (Rimouski Océanic) (QMJHL)
- Top scorer: Sidney Crosby (Rimouski Océanic) (QMJHL)

Memorial Cup
- Finals champions: Kelowna Rockets (WHL)
- Runners-up: Gatineau Olympiques (QMJHL)

The 2003–04 QMJHL season was the 35th season in the history of the Quebec Major Junior Hockey League. The league continued to expand to new eastern markets, with teams relocating to Maine and Prince Edward Island. Conferences were abandoned and teams were divided into three divisions by geography. Sixteen teams played 70 games each in the schedule.

The Lewiston Maineiacs became the league's second American-based team in history after the Plattsburgh Pioneers, and first to survive a full season. The P.E.I. Rocket also became the first major junior hockey team based on Prince Edward Island.

Rookie Sidney Crosby led the league in scoring as a 16-year-old, and won the Michel Brière Memorial Trophy as the MVP of the regular season.

The Gatineau Olympiques finished first overall in the regular season winning their fourth Jean Rougeau Trophy, and also won their sixth President's Cup, defeating the Moncton Wildcats in the finals.

== Team changes ==
- The Hull Olympiques were renamed the Gatineau Olympiques.
- The Montreal Rocket relocated to Charlottetown, Prince Edward Island, becoming the P.E.I. Rocket.
- The Sherbrooke Castors relocated to Lewiston, Maine, becoming the Lewiston Maineiacs.

== Final standings ==
Note: GP = Games played; W = Wins; L = Losses; T = Ties; OL = Overtime loss; PTS = Points; GF = Goals for; GA = Goals against

Western Division	GP	W	L	T	OL	Pts	GF	GA
y-Gatineau Olympiques	70	50	13	7	0	107	306	179
x-Shawinigan Cataractes	70	39	21	4	6	88	259	215
x-Rouyn-Noranda Huskies	70	30	27	9	4	73	260	265
x-Val-d'Or Foreurs	70	29	29	10	2	70	213	222
x-Drummondville Voltigeurs	70	27	30	10	3	67	210	224
Victoriaville Tigres	70	20	43	5	2	47	204	295

Eastern Division	GP	W	L	T	OL	Pts	GF	GA
y-Rimouski Océanic	70	34	28	5	3	76	284	252
x-Chicoutimi Saguenéens	70	32	27	7	4	75	218	220
x-Lewiston Maineiacs	70	33	31	5	1	72	233	215
x-Quebec Remparts	70	28	32	7	3	66	210	245
x-Baie-Comeau Drakkar	70	21	42	5	2	49	195	285

Atlantic Division	GP	W	L	T	OL	Pts	GF	GA
y-Cape Breton Screaming Eagles	70	49	16	2	3	103	273	164
x-Moncton Wildcats	70	46	19	3	2	97	270	206
x-P.E.I. Rocket	70	40	19	5	6	91	251	189
Halifax Mooseheads	70	17	43	7	3	44	194	274
Acadie-Bathurst Titan	70	18	49	3	0	39	184	314

y-received first-round bye
x-made playoffs

- complete list of standings.

== Scoring leaders ==
Note: GP = Games played; G = Goals; A = Assists; Pts = Points; PIM = Penalty minutes

Player	Team	GP	G	A	Pts	PIM
Sidney Crosby	Rimouski Océanic	59	54	81	135	74
Dany Roussin	Rimouski Océanic	66	59	58	117	70
Maxime Talbot	Gatineau Olympiques	51	25	73	98	41
Jean-Michel Daoust	Gatineau Olympiques	60	31	65	96	82
Benoît Mondou	Shawinigan Cataractes	68	34	61	95	32
Pascal Pelletier	Shawinigan Cataractes	64	39	52	91	85
Yannick Tifu	Rouyn-Noranda Huskies	70	42	48	90	39
Guillaume Fournier	Victoriaville/Gatineau	65	40	48	88	28
François-Pierre Guenette	Cape Breton Screaming Eagles	69	34	51	85	26
Karl Gagné	Moncton Wildcats	68	24	60	84	20
Michael Lambert	P.E.I. Rocket	67	42	42	84	53

- complete scoring statistics

== Leading goaltenders ==
Note: GP = Games played; TOI = Total ice time; W = Wins; L = Losses; T = Ties; GA = Goals against; SO = Total shutouts; SV% = Save percentage; GAA = Goals against average

Player	Team	GP	TOI	W	L	T	GA	SO	SV%	GAA
Martin Houle	Cape Breton Screaming Eagles	51	2950:48	34	15	1	114	3	.921	2.32
Corey Crawford	Moncton Wildcats	54	3019:02	35	15	3	132	2	.919	2.62
David Tremblay	Gatineau Olympiques	47	2671:34	33	10	3	117	3	.908	2.63
Jeff Deslauriers	Chicoutimi Saguenéens	50	2705:44	21	20	6	129	1	.916	2.87
Julien Ellis	Shawinigan Cataractes	59	3286:54	32	18	2	157	1	.903	2.87

== Canada-Russia Challenge ==
The 2003–04 season was the first time the Canada-Russia challenge was played. The event, then known as the RE/MAX Canada-Russia Challenge was hosted by the Halifax Mooseheads and the Rimouski Océanic. On November 20, 2003, the Russian Selects defeated the QMJHL All-stars 3–2 at the Halifax Metro Centre. On November 24, 2003, the QMJHL All-stars defeated the Russian Selects 6–2 at Colisée de Rimouski.

== Playoffs ==
Each regular season division winner received a first round bye, and ranked 1st, 2nd, and 3rd overall. Remaining teams were ranked 4th to 13th, regardless of division.

Maxime Talbot was the leading scorer of the playoffs with 27 points (11 goals, 16 assists).

First round
8	Rouyn-Noranda	4
9	Lewiston	3
7	Chicoutimi	4
10	Val-d'Or	3
6	Shawinigan	4
11	Drummondville	3
5	P. E. I.	4
12	Quebec	1
4	Moncton	4
13	Baie-Comeau	0

Quarterfinals
1	Gatineau	4
8	Rouyn-Noranda	0
2	Cape Breton	1
7	Chicoutimi	4
3	Rimouski	4
6	Shawinigan	0
4	Moncton	4
5	P. E. I.	2

Semifinals
1	Gatineau	4
7	Chicoutimi	2
3	Rimouski	1
4	Moncton	4

Finals
1	Gatineau	4
4	Moncton	1

== First round ==
=== (8) Rouyn-Noranda Huskies vs. (9) Lewiston Maineiacs ===
March 19	Rouyn-Noranda Huskies	4 – 1	Lewiston Maineiacs	Aréna Dave Keon
6:15 - Petr Přeučil (1)		First period	No scoring
No scoring		Second period	No scoring
8:44 - pp - Guillaume Desbiens (1); 11:07 - Eric Beaudin (1); 14:49 - sh - Dominic Deblois (1)		Third period	Karl Fournier (1) - 4:28
Mathieu Poitras (55 saves / 56 shots)		Goalie stats	Matthew Davis (28 saves / 32 shots)

March 20	Rouyn-Noranda Huskies	2 – 7	Lewiston Maineiacs	Aréna Dave Keon
No scoring		First period	Alex Bourret (1) - 0:29; Alexandre Picard (1) - pp - 4:53
No scoring		Second period	Francis Trudel (1) - pp - 5:27; Francis Trudel (2) - pp - 7:49; Alexandre Picard (2) - 11:22; Alexandre Picard (3) - pp - 14:50
8:59 - pp - Brent Aubin (1); 11:37 - pp - Alexandre Bolduc (1)		Third period	Alexandre Picard (4) - 8:23
Mathieu Poitras (22 saves / 27 shots); Philippe Roberge (12 saves / 14 shots)		Goalie stats	Brandon Verge (35 saves / 37 shots)

March 23	Lewiston Maineiacs	0 – 6	Rouyn-Noranda Huskies	The Colisée
No scoring		First period	Petr Přeučil (2) - 14:58
No scoring		Second period	Petr Přeučil (3) - 2:31; Yannick Tifu (1) - 3:03; Dominic Deblois (2) - 4:50; Eric Beaudin (2) - pp - 13:52; Dominic Deblois (3) - 19:50
No scoring		Third period	No scoring
Matthew Davis (13 saves / 16 shots); Brandon Verge (18 saves / 21 shots)		Goalie stats	Mathieu Poitras (51 saves / 51 shots)

March 24	Lewiston Maineiacs	4 – 5	OT	Rouyn-Noranda Huskies	The Colisée
No scoring		First period		Dominic Deblois (4) - 14:43
15:04 - pp - Alexandre Picard (5)		Second period		Alexandre Bolduc (2) - 0:22; Brent Aubin (2) - pp - 17:37
10:22 - pp - Alexandre Picard (6); 10:38 - Karl Fournier (2); 18:20 - Marc-André Cliche (1)		Third period		Philippe Séguin (1) - 5:08
No scoring		First overtime period		Dominic Deblois (5) - 5:22
Brandon Verge (36 saves / 41 shots)		Goalie stats		Mathieu Poitras (48 saves / 52 shots)

March 26	Rouyn-Noranda Huskies	2 – 3	OT	Lewiston Maineiacs	Aréna Dave Keon

March 28	Lewiston Maineiacs	4 – 2	Rouyn-Noranda Huskies	The Colisée

March 30	Rouyn-Noranda Huskies	5 – 0	Lewiston Maineiacs	Aréna Dave Keon

Rouyn-Noranda won series 4 – 3

=== (7) Chicoutimi Saguenéens vs. (10) Val-d'Or Foreurs ===
March 19	Chicoutimi Saguenéens	4 – 0	Val-d'Or Foreurs	Centre Georges-Vézina
17:22 - David Desharnais (1)		First period	No scoring
11:11 - sh - Maxime Boisclair (1)		Second period	No scoring
0:14 - pp - Stanislav Lašček (1); 5:29 - pp - Yvan Busque (1)		Third period	No scoring
Jeff Deslauriers (24 saves / 24 shots)		Goalie stats	Maxime Daigneault (23 saves / 27 shots)

March 20	Chicoutimi Saguenéens	1 – 4	Val-d'Or Foreurs	Centre Georges-Vézina
No scoring		First period	No scoring
No scoring		Second period	Erick Lajoie (1) - 1:21; Olivier Latendresse (1) - 9:05; Vladimir Kútny (1) - 16:19
4:56 - Francis Lemieux (1)		Third period	Mathieu Dumas (1) - en - 18:48
Jeff Deslauriers (15 saves / 18 shots); Alexandre Vincent (5 saves / 5 shots)		Goalie stats	Maxime Daigneault (23 saves / 24 shots)

March 23	Val-d'Or Foreurs	1 – 3	Chicoutimi Saguenéens	Palais des Sports
17:10 - pp - Sébastien Bisaillon (1)		First period	Stanislav Lašček (2) - pp - 19:47
No scoring		Second period	Stanislav Lašček (3) - 4:13
No scoring		Third period	David Desharnais (2) - en - 19:08
Maxime Daigneault (33 saves / 35 shots)		Goalie stats	Jeff Deslauriers (31 saves / 32 shots)

March 24	Val-d'Or Foreurs	1 – 3	Chicoutimi Saguenéens	Palais des Sports
No scoring		First period	Michel Dubé (1) - 2:50; Martin Chabot (1) - 3:28; Sébastien Courcelles (1) - pp - 14:26
2:33 - Mark Hurtubise (1)		Second period	No scoring
No scoring		Third period	No scoring
Maxime Daigneault (27 saves / 30 shots)		Goalie stats	Jeff Deslauriers (25 saves / 26 shots)

March 26	Chicoutimi Saguenéens	1 – 2	OT	Val-d'Or Foreurs	Centre Georges-Vézina
No scoring		First period		No scoring
1:52 - pp - Rosario Ruggeri (1)		Second period		Patrice Bilodeau (1) - pp - 18:24
No scoring		Third period		No scoring
No scoring		First overtime period		Mark Hurtubise (2) - 0:28
Jeff Deslauriers (17 saves / 19 shots)		Goalie stats		Maxime Daigneault (29 saves / 30 shots)

March 28	Val-d'Or Foreurs	6 – 1	Chicoutimi Saguenéens	Palais des Sports
3:02 - Luc Bourdon (1); 6:52 - pp - Mathieu Dumas (2)		First period	Yan Gaudette (1) - pp - 15:17
5:55 - Patrick Bordeleau (1); 7:49 - pp - Mark Hurtubise (3)		Second period	No scoring
4:30 - pp - Erick Lajoie (2); 11:16 - pp - François Gagnon (1)		Third period	No scoring
Maxime Daigneault (41 saves / 42 shots); François Thuot (0 saves / 0 shots)		Goalie stats	Jeff Deslauriers (3 saves / 6 shots); Alexandre Vincent (24 saves / 27 shots)

March 30	Chicoutimi Saguenéens	4 – 3	Val-d'Or Foreurs	Centre Georges-Vézina

Chicoutimi won series 4 – 3

=== (6) Shawinigan Cataractes vs. (11) Drummondville Voltigeurs ===
March 19	Shawinigan Cataractes	2 – 3	Drummondville Voltigeurs	Aréna Jacques Plante
No scoring		First period	No scoring
9:27 - Jonathan Jolette (1)		Second period	Pierre Morvan (1) - 13:40; Kéven Gagné (1) - 18:02
14:29 - sh - Thiery Poudrier (1)		Third period	Kéven Gagné (2) - sh - 9:05
Julien Ellis (18 saves / 21 shots)		Goalie stats	Sylvain Michaud (48 saves / 50 shots)

March 20	Shawinigan Cataractes	6 – 4	Drummondville Voltigeurs	Aréna Jacques Plante

March 23	Drummondville Voltigeurs	1 – 2	Shawinigan Cataractes	Centre Marcel-Dionne

March 24	Drummondville Voltigeurs	2 – 1	Shawinigan Cataractes	Centre Marcel-Dionne

March 26	Shawinigan Cataractes	10 – 1	Drummondville Voltigeurs	Aréna Jacques Plante

March 28	Drummondville Voltigeurs	4 – 3	OT	Shawinigan Cataractes	Centre Marcel-Dionne

March 30	Shawinigan Cataractes	3 – 1	Drummondville Voltigeurs	Aréna Jacques Plante

Shawinigan won series 4 – 3

=== (5) P.E.I. Rocket vs. (12) Quebec Remparts ===
March 19	P.E.I. Rocket	1 – 3	Quebec Remparts	Charlottetown Civic Centre
No scoring		First period	Jordan LaVallee (1) - 12:56
10:09 - Michaël Lambert (1)		Second period	Alexei Shkotov (1) - 0:43
No scoring		Third period	Alexei Shkotov (2) - 17:28
Jonathan Boutin (20 saves / 23 shots)		Goalie stats	Jean-Michel Filiatrault (33 saves / 34 shots)

March 20	P.E.I. Rocket	3 – 2	OT	Quebec Remparts	Charlottetown Civic Centre
9:45 - Jonathan Persson (1)		First period		Robert Pearce (1) - 15:00
No scoring		Second period		No scoring
11:59 - Maxim Lapierre (1)		Third period		Nathan Welton (1) - 16:29
17:37 - Maxim Lapierre (2)		First overtime period		No scoring
Jonathan Boutin (29 saves / 31 shots)		Goalie stats		Jean-Michel Filiatrault (63 saves / 66 shots)

March 23	Quebec Remparts	2 – 5	P.E.I. Rocket	Colisée Pepsi
4:15 - pp - Kevin Coughlin (1)		First period	No scoring
16:11 - Ian Mathieu-Girard (1)		Second period	Jonathan Persson (2) - sh - 14:59
No scoring		Third period	Maxim Lapierre (3) - 8:30; Steve Pelletier (1) - pp - 9:29; Michaël Lambert (2) - pp - 10:59; David Laliberté (1) - 16:11
Jean-Michel Filiatrault (33 saves / 38 shots)		Goalie stats	Jonathan Boutin (38 saves / 40 shots)

March 24	Quebec Remparts	1 – 2	P.E.I. Rocket	Colisée Pepsi
18:13 - pp - Alexei Shkotov (3)		First period	No scoring
No scoring		Second period	No scoring
No scoring		Third period	Maxim Lapierre (4) - pp - 4:28; Jonathan Persson (3) - 5:24
Jean-Michel Filiatrault (28 saves / 30 shots)		Goalie stats	Jonathan Boutin (21 saves / 22 shots)

March 26	P.E.I. Rocket	7 – 1	Quebec Remparts	Charlottetown Civic Centre
5:58 - Maxim Lapierre (5); 13:09 - pp - Dominic Soucy (1); 19:46 - pp - Michaël Lambert (3)		First period	No scoring
3:12 - Cory Urquhart (1); 11:20 - pp - Milan Hruška (1); 13:48 - Michaël Lambert (4)		Second period	No scoring
10:06 - Cory Urquhart (2)		Third period	Jordan LaVallee (2) - 17:22
Jonathan Boutin (24 saves / 25 shots); Jean-Michel Côté (8 saves / 10 shots)		Goalie stats	Jean-Michel Filiatrault (16 saves / 21 shots)

P.E.I. won series 4 – 1

=== (4) Moncton Wildcats vs. (13) Baie-Comeau Drakkar ===
March 19	Moncton Wildcats	8 – 1	Baie-Comeau Drakkar	Moncton Coliseum
4:43 - Kevin Glode (1); 7:42 - pp - Karl Gagné (1); 16:40 - Thierry Douville (1); 17:17 - Karl Gagné (2)		First period	No scoring
8:26 - pp - Konstantin Zakharov (1); 15:37 - Mathieu Bétournay (1)		Second period	Jean-François Jacques (1) - 10:38
2:51 - Cody Doucette (1); 5:31 - pp - Konstantin Zakharov (2)		Third period	No scoring
Corey Crawford (26 saves / 27 shots)		Goalie stats	Loïc Lacasse (9 saves / 12 shots); Julien Walsh (26 saves / 31 shots)

March 20	Moncton Wildcats	3 – 2	OT	Baie-Comeau Drakkar	Moncton Coliseum
No scoring		First period		No scoring
10:23 - Luke Pelham (1)		Second period		Jonathan Duchesneau (1) - 2:51
5:01 - pp - James Sanford (1)		Third period		Jimmy Arsenault (1) - pp - 18:47
6:59 - Steve Bernier (1)		First overtime period		No scoring
Corey Crawford (37 saves / 39 shots)		Goalie stats		Loïc Lacasse (43 saves / 46 shots)

March 23	Baie-Comeau Drakkar	1 – 7	Moncton Wildcats	Centre Henry-Leonard
No scoring		First period	Ryan Salvis (1) - 5:46; Steve Bernier (2) - pp - 17:37
9:42 - pp - Luis Tremblay (1)		Second period	Steve Bernier (3) - 1:47; Mathieu Wathier (1) - 7:23; Cody Doucette (2) - 8:43; Steve Bernier (4) - 12:20
No scoring		Third period	Joshua Hepditch (1) - pp - 14:56
Loïc Lacasse (11 saves / 16 shots); Julien Walsh (12 saves / 14 shots)		Goalie stats	Corey Crawford (28 saves / 29 shots)

March 24	Baie-Comeau Drakkar	1 – 5	Moncton Wildcats	Centre Henry-Leonard
No scoring		First period	Kevin Glode (2) - 11:48; Mathieu Bétournay (2) - 18:32
No scoring		Second period	Mathieu Bétournay (3) - 4:24; Steve Bernier (5) - 12:42
0:55 - Alexandre Blais (1)		Third period	Christian Gaudet (1) - 12:17
Loïc Lacasse (33 saves / 38 shots)		Goalie stats	Corey Crawford (23 saves / 24 shots)

Moncton won series 4 – 0

== Quarterfinals ==
=== (1) Gatineau Olympiques vs. (8) Rouyn-Noranda Huskies ===
April 2	Gatineau Olympiques	3 – 1	Rouyn-Noranda Huskies	Centre Robert Guertin
8:39 - pp - Guillaume Labrecque (1)		First period	No scoring
4:03 - pp - Maxime Talbot (1)		Second period	No scoring
3:35 - Nick Fugère (1)		Third period	Rémi Tremblay (1) - pp - 5:28
David Tremblay (23 saves / 24 shots)		Goalie stats	Mathieu Poitras (42 saves / 45 shots)

April 4	Rouyn-Noranda Huskies	2 – 3	OT	Gatineau Olympiques	Aréna Dave Keon
Rémi Tremblay (2) - 5:11		First period		No scoring
Brent Aubin (4) - pp - 0:22		Second period		16:37 - Jean-Michel Daoust (1)
No scoring		Third period		16:32 - Derrick Kent (1)
No scoring		First overtime period		10:34 - Philippe Dupuis (1)
Mathieu Poitras (45 saves / 48 shots)		Goalie stats		David Tremblay (31 saves / 33 shots)

April 6	Rouyn-Noranda Huskies	3 – 4	Gatineau Olympiques	Aréna Dave Keon
No scoring		First period	Guillaume Labrecque (2) - 1:08; Philippe Dupuis (2) - pp - 8:30
No scoring		Second period	Nick Fugère (2) - 8:38; Olivier Labelle (1) - 11:20
0:39 - Rémi Tremblay (3); 10:41 - Dominic Deblois (7); 18:29 - Petr Přeučil (4)		Third period	No scoring
Mathieu Poitras (40 saves / 44 shots); Philippe Roberge (1 save / 1 shot)		Goalie stats	David Tremblay (29 saves / 32 shots)

April 8	Gatineau Olympiques	5 – 2	Rouyn-Noranda Huskies	Centre Robert Guertin
Maxime Talbot (2) - 3:59; Guillaume Fournier (1) - pp - 6:50		First period	12:19 - Yannick Tifu (4)
Sam Roberts (1) - 17:37		Second period	No scoring
Philippe Dupuis (3) - 6:25; Maxime Talbot (3) - en - 19:21		Third period	11:37 - Philippe Séguin (3)
David Tremblay (28 saves / 30 shots)		Goalie stats	Mathieu Poitras (37 saves / 41 shots)

Gatineau won series 4 – 0

=== (3) Cape Breton Screaming Eagles vs. (6) Chicoutimi Saguenéens ===
April 2	Cape Breton Screaming Eagles	3 – 2	Chicoutimi Saguenéens	Centre 200
No scoring		First period	No scoring
2:02 - Guillaume Demers (1)		Second period	Sébastien Courcelles (4) - 7:33
10:25 - Guillaume Demers (2); 11:32 - Guillaume Demers (3)		Third period	Francis Lemieux (2) - 13:54
Marc-André Fleury (16 saves / 18 shots)		Goalie stats	Jeff Deslauriers (30 saves / 33 shots)

April 3	Cape Breton Screaming Eagles	3 – 4	OT	Chicoutimi Saguenéens	Centre 200
No scoring		First period		Maxime Boisclair (3) - pp - 17:14
No scoring		Second period		No scoring
4:38 - pp - Stephen Dixon (1); 12:37 - Jean-François Cyr (1); 18:11 - Guillaume Demers (4)		Third period		Maxime Boisclair (4) - sh - 15:27; Francis Lemieux (3) - 19:40
No scoring		First overtime period		Francis Lemieux (4) - sh - 7:32
Marc-André Fleury (31 saves / 35 shots)		Goalie stats		Jeff Deslauriers (44 saves / 47 shots)

April 6	Chicoutimi Saguenéens	4 – 3	OT	Cape Breton Screaming Eagles	Centre Georges-Vézina
No scoring		First period		Guillaume Demers (5) - pp - 7:45
3:08 - pp - Rosario Ruggeri (2); 4:14 - Sébastien Courcelles (5)		Second period		Guillaume Demers (6) - pp - 7:55
4:22 - pp - Maxime Boisclair (5)		Third period		Samuel Béland (1) - 1:21
4:48 - pp - Maxime Boisclair (6)		First overtime period		No scoring
Jeff Deslauriers (33 saves / 36 shots)		Goalie stats		Marc-André Fleury (31 saves / 35 shots)

April 7	Chicoutimi Saguenéens	3 – 2	Cape Breton Screaming Eagles	Centre Georges-Vézina
9:50 - Stanislav Lašček (5)		First period	No scoring
16:37 - pp - David Desharnais (3)		Second period	Michael Tessier (1) - 0:41; Marc-André Bernier (1) - 9:33
17:04 - pp - David Desharnais (4)		Third period	No scoring
Jeff Deslauriers (32 saves / 34 shots)		Goalie stats	Marc-André Fleury (23 saves / 26 shots)

April 9	Cape Breton Screaming Eagles	2 – 5	Chicoutimi Saguenéens	Centre 200
2:53 - Steve Villeneuve (1)		First period	Maxime Boisclair (7) - 14:31
No scoring		Second period	Julien Lavoie (1) - pp - 4:16; Maxime Boisclair (8) - 11:46
1:46 - Nicolas Corbeil (1)		Third period	Michel Dubé (2) - 6:56; Francis Lemieux (5) - en - 19:35
Martin Houle (18 saves / 22 shots)		Goalie stats	Jeff Deslauriers (45 saves / 47 shots)

Chicoutimi won series 4 – 1

=== (1) Rimouski Océanic vs. (8) Shawinigan Cataractes ===
April 2	Rimouski Océanic	4 – 2	Shawinigan Cataractes	Colisée de Rimouski
No scoring		First period	Thiery Poudrier (3) - 2:34
0:53 - Mark Tobin (1); 6:53 - pp - Marc-Antoine Pouliot (1)		Second period	Michal Gavalier (2) - 18:44
3:46 - pp - Danny Stewart (1); 19:34 - en - Sidney Crosby (1)		Third period	No scoring
Guillaume Lavallée (22 saves / 24 shots)		Goalie stats	Julien Ellis (32 saves / 35 shots)

April 3	Rimouski Océanic	5 – 1	Shawinigan Cataractes	Colisée de Rimouski
4:54 - sh - Marc-Antoine Pouliot (2); 8:35 - Sidney Crosby (2); 16:50 - Mark Tobin (2)		First period	No scoring
5:57 - Sidney Crosby (3); 18:45 - sh - Sidney Crosby (4)		Second period	No scoring
No scoring		Third period	Marek Haščák (1) - pp - 19:14
Guillaume Lavallée (24 saves / 25 shots)		Goalie stats	Julien Ellis (15 saves / 20 shots); Marc-Olivier Gignac (7 saves / 7 shots)

April 6	Shawinigan Cataractes	2 – 8	Rimouski Océanic	Aréna Jacques Plante
No scoring		First period	Dany Roussin (1) - pp - 7:20; Danny Stewart (2) - pp - 10:08; Danny Stewart (3) - pp - 19:47
No scoring		Second period	Marc-Antoine Pouliot (3) - pp - 14:04; Zbyněk Hrdel (1) - pp - 19:41
3:53 - pp - Pierre-Marc Guilbault (1); 6:42 - pp - Jonathan Jolette (7)		Third period	Dany Roussin (2) - pp - 5:23; Mark Tobin (3) - pp - 9:48; Michal Sersen (1) - pp - 13:25
Julien Ellis (46 saves / 54 shots)		Goalie stats	Guillaume Lavallée (22 saves / 24 shots)

April 8	Shawinigan Cataractes	3 – 4	Rimouski Océanic	Aréna Jacques Plante
13:59 - pp - Danick Bouchard (3)		First period	Sidney Crosby (5) - 12:53
1:09 - Benoît Mondou (3)		Second period	Zbyněk Hrdel (2) - 12:26; Mark Tobin (4) - 15:19; Sidney Crosby (6) - pp - 16:33
3:14 - Benoît Mondou (4)		Third period	No scoring
Julien Ellis (26 saves / 30 shots)		Goalie stats	Guillaume Lavallée (34 saves / 37 shots)

Rimouski won series 4 – 0

=== (4) Moncton Wildcats vs. (5) P.E.I. Rocket ===
April 3	Moncton Wildcats	1 – 5	P.E.I. Rocket	Moncton Coliseum
No scoring		First period	No scoring
6:21 - Ryan Salvis (2)		Second period	Maxim Lapierre (6) - 9:00; Jimmy Bonneau (1) - 11:05; Tyler Hawes (1) - 16:00
No scoring		Third period	Pierre-André Bureau (1) - 4:58; Dominic Soucy (2) - 16:16
Corey Crawford (33 saves / 38 shots)		Goalie stats	Jonathan Boutin (36 saves / 37 shots)

April 4	Moncton Wildcats	3 – 2	OT	P.E.I. Rocket	Moncton Coliseum
No scoring		First period		Maxim Lapierre (7) - 11:27; Cory Urquhart (3) - 17:28
6:57 - pp - Karl Gagné (3)		Second period		No scoring
6:47 - Christian Gaudet (2)		Third period		No scoring
4:11 - Konstantin Zakharov (3)		First overtime period		No scoring
Corey Crawford (36 saves / 38 shots)		Goalie stats		Jonathan Boutin (38 saves / 41 shots)

April 7	P.E.I. Rocket	1 – 3	Moncton Wildcats	Charlottetown Civic Centre
No scoring		First period	Steve Bernier (6) - pp - 17:59
8:22 - Steve Pelletier (2)		Second period	James Sanford (2) - 6:27
No scoring		Third period	Mathieu Bétournay (4) - 5:03
Jonathan Boutin (32 saves / 35 shots)		Goalie stats	Corey Crawford (35 saves / 36 shots)

April 8	P.E.I. Rocket	1 – 5	Moncton Wildcats	Charlottetown Civic Centre
14:12 - Cory Urquhart (4)		First period	No scoring
No scoring		Second period	Mārtiņš Karsums (1) - pp - 12:49; Mārtiņš Karsums (2) - 15:22
No scoring		Third period	Kevin Glode (3) - 4:43; Konstantin Zakharov (4) - 12:14; Kevin Glode (4) - pp - 19:59
Jonathan Boutin (18 saves / 21 shots); Ryan Mior (6 saves / 8 shots)		Goalie stats	Corey Crawford (37 saves / 38 shots)

April 10	Moncton Wildcats	1 – 6	P.E.I. Rocket	Moncton Coliseum
0:31 - Steve Bernier (7)		First period	Pierre-André Bureau (2) - 6:32; Cory Urquhart (5) - pp - 18:25
No scoring		Second period	No scoring
No scoring		Third period	Michaël Lambert (5) - 0:47; Dominic Soucy (3) - 5:05; Michaël Lambert (6) - 5:31; Yanick Charron (1) - pp - 16:37
Corey Crawford (31 saves / 36 shots); Ryan Papaioannou (12 saves / 13 shots)		Goalie stats	Jonathan Boutin (24 saves / 25 shots)

April 12	P.E.I. Rocket	2 – 3	OT	Moncton Wildcats	Charlottetown Civic Centre
No scoring		First period		No scoring
14:23 - Cory Urquhart (6); 17:48 - Jonathan Persson (4)		Second period		James Sanford (3) - pp - 6:11
No scoring		Third period		Nathan Saunders (1) - 17:08
No scoring		First overtime period		James Sanford (4) - 8:23
Jonathan Boutin (42 saves / 45 shots)		Goalie stats		Corey Crawford (33 saves / 35 shots)

Moncton wins series 4 – 2

== Semifinals ==
=== (1) Gatineau Olympiques vs. (4) Chicoutimi Saguenéens ===
April 16	Gatineau Olympiques	2 – 3	Chicoutimi Saguenéens	Centre Robert Guertin
No scoring		First period	Francis Lemieux (6) - sh - 19:23
No scoring		Second period	Sébastien Courcelles (6) - pp - 12:54
6:21 - pp - Maxime Talbot (4); 11:57 - pp - Philippe Dupuis (4)		Third period	Martin Chabot (2) - pp - 4:44
David Tremblay (19 saves / 22 shots)		Goalie stats	Jeff Deslauriers (29 saves / 31 shots)

April 18	Gatineau Olympiques	6 – 1	Chicoutimi Saguenéens	Centre Robert Guertin
No scoring		First period	No scoring
2:49 - Sam Roberts (2); 4:27 - Guillaume Labrecque (3); 12:40 - Nick Fugère (3); 13:23 - pp - Guillaume Fournier (2); 14:19 - sh - Jean-Michel Daoust (2)		Second period	No scoring
4:44 - Guillaume Labrecque (4)		Third period	Martin Chabot (3) - 17:44
David Tremblay (14 saves / 15 shots)		Goalie stats	Jeff Deslauriers (24 saves / 29 shots); Alexandre Vincent (10 saves / 11 shots)

April 20	Chicoutimi Saguenéens	4 – 3	Gatineau Olympiques	Centre Georges-Vézina
6:14 - pp - Maxime Boisclair (9); 13:46 - Sébastien Courcelles (7); 3:06 - Marc-André Roy (1); 13:11 - Michel Dubé (3)		First period	Guillaume Labrecque (5) - 15:35
No scoring		Second period	No scoring
No scoring		Third period	Philippe Dupuis (5) - pp - 2:58; Maxime Talbot (5) - 16:41
Jeff Deslauriers (30 saves / 33 shots)		Goalie stats	David Tremblay (9 saves / 13 shots); Gabriel Bouthillette (8 saves / 8 shots)

April 22	Chicoutimi Saguenéens	2 – 7	Gatineau Olympiques	Centre Georges-Vézina
No scoring		First period	Doug O'Brien (1) - pp - 6:08; Guillaume Fournier (3) - sh - 8:46
9:19 - Marc-André Roy (2)		Second period	Guillaume Fournier (4) - 0:26; Guillaume Fournier (5) - 1:29; Guillaume Labrecque (6) - 14:48; Guillaume Fournier (6) - pp - 18:00
19:44 - Yan Gaudette (2)		Third period	Keven Petit (1) - pp - 15:54
Jeff Deslauriers (12 saves / 16 shots); Alexandre Vincent (30 saves / 33 shots)		Goalie stats	David Tremblay (19 saves / 21 shots)

April 24	Gatineau Olympiques	9 – 0	Chicoutimi Saguenéens	Centre Robert Guertin
9:26 - pp - Guillaume Fournier (7); 16:00 - Jean-Michel Daoust (3)		First period
1:42 - pp - Dominic D'Amour (1); 9:42 - Derrick Kent (2); 16:34 - pp - Dominic D'Amour (2)		Second period	No scoring
0:12 - pp - Maxime Talbot (6); 3:15 - Scott Brophy (1); 12:42 - Olivier Labelle (2); 18:12 - Keven Petit (2)		Third period	No scoring
David Tremblay (13 saves / 13 shots)		Goalie stats	Jeff Deslauriers (22 saves / 29 shots); Alexandre Vincent (14 saves / 16 shots)

April 26	Chicoutimi Saguenéens	2 – 3	OT	Gatineau Olympiques	Centre Georges-Vézina
No scoring		First period		No scoring
7:52 - Martin Chabot (4)		Second period		Guillaume Fournier (8) - 0:45
4:53 - pp - Yvan Busque (2)		Third period		Guillaume Fournier (9) - 16:33
No scoring		First overtime period		Jean-Michel Daoust (4) - 10:17
Jeff Deslauriers (47 saves / 50 shots)		Goalie stats		David Tremblay (23 saves / 25 shots)

Gatineau wins series 4 – 2

=== (3) Rimouski Océanic vs. (4) Moncton Wildcats ===
April 16	Rimouski Océanic	1 – 4	Moncton Wildcats	Colisée de Rimouski
No scoring		First period	No scoring
3:49 - pp - Sidney Crosby (7)		Second period	Mathieu Wathier (2) - 10:24
No scoring		Third period	Mārtiņš Karsums (3) - 7:00; Christian Gaudet (3) - 13:51; Mathieu Bétournay (5) - 17:28
Guillaume Lavallée (29 saves / 33 shots)		Goalie stats	Corey Crawford (28 saves / 29 shots)

April 18	Rimouski Océanic	2 – 1	Moncton Wildcats	Colisée de Rimouski
7:00 - Zbyněk Hrdel (3)		First period	Konstantin Zakharov (5) - pp - 17:20
17:16 - Zbyněk Hrdel (4)		Second period	No scoring
No scoring		Third period	No scoring
Guillaume Lavallée (27 saves / 28 shots)		Goalie stats	Corey Crawford (47 saves / 49 shots)

April 20	Moncton Wildcats	6 – 1	Rimouski Océanic	Moncton Coliseum
14:45 - pp - Mathieu Bétournay (6); 18:08 - sh - Ryan Salvis (3)		First period	No scoring
18:51 - Karl Gagné (4)		Second period	No scoring
3:18 - Maxime Desruisseaux (1); 5:52 - Mārtiņš Karsums (4); 6:08 - Mārtiņš Karsums (5)		Third period	Jean-Michel Bolduc (1) - 0:21
Corey Crawford (42 saves / 43 shots)		Goalie stats	Guillaume Lavallée (23 saves / 29 shots); Cédrick Desjardins (15 saves / 15 shots)

April 22	Moncton Wildcats	3 – 1	Rimouski Océanic	Moncton Coliseum
9:32 - Mathieu Bétournay (7); 17:59 - Mathieu Bétournay (8)		First period	Marc-Antoine Pouliot (4) - 17:52
11:19 - Karl Gagné (5)		Second period	No scoring
No scoring		Third period	No scoring
Corey Crawford (55 saves / 56 shots)		Goalie stats	Guillaume Lavallée (36 saves / 39 shots)

April 26	Rimouski Océanic	1 – 2	Moncton Wildcats	Colisée de Rimouski
No scoring		First period	Mathieu Bétournay (9) - pp - 6:35
16:25 - pp - Marc-Antoine Pouliot (5)		Second period	No scoring
No scoring		Third period	Kevin Glode (5) - 15:04
Guillaume Lavallée (26 saves / 28 shots)		Goalie stats	Corey Crawford (30 saves / 31 shots)

Moncton wins series 4 – 1

== President's Cup Finals ==
=== (1) Gatineau Olympiques vs. (4) Moncton Wildcats ===
April 30	Gatineau Olympiques	3 – 0	Moncton Wildcats	Centre Robert Guertin
15:31 - pp - Olivier Labelle (3)		First period	No scoring
11:41 - pp - Guillaume Labrecque (7); 13:18 - Maxime Talbot (7)		Second period	No scoring
No scoring		Third period	No scoring
David Tremblay (16 saves / 16 shots)		Goalie stats	Corey Crawford (23 saves / 26 shots)

May 2	Moncton Wildcats	2 – 3	Gatineau Olympiques	Moncton Coliseum
No scoring		First period	12:24 - Christian Laroche (1)
Mārtiņš Karsums (6) - pp - 3:04; James Sanford (5) - pp - 14:26		Second period	3:54 - Jean-Michel Daoust (5); 9:45 - Dominic D'Amour (3)
No scoring		Third period	No scoring
Corey Crawford (29 saves / 32 shots)		Goalie stats	David Tremblay (22 saves / 24 shots)

May 4	Gatineau Olympiques	8 – 2	Moncton Wildcats	Centre Robert Guertin
Maxime Talbot (8) - pp - 5:12; Guillaume Fournier (10) - 7:20; Maxime Talbot (9) - pp - 19:15		First period	No scoring
Sam Roberts (3) - 0:39; Guillaume Labrecque (8) - pp - 18:39; Guillaume Fournier (11) - 19:31		Second period	9:35 - Konstantin Zakharov (6); 11:26 - pp - Mārtiņš Karsums (7)
Philippe Dupuis (6) - pp - 1:26; Maxime Talbot (10) - pp - 11:11		Third period	No scoring
David Tremblay (20 saves / 22 shots)		Goalie stats	Corey Crawford (11 saves / 15 shots); Ryan Papaioannou (15 saves / 19 shots)

May 7	Moncton Wildcats	5 – 4	Gatineau Olympiques	Moncton Coliseum
1:10 - Mārtiņš Karsums (8); 18:36 - Konstantin Zakharov (7)		First period	Maxime Talbot (11) - 7:53
5:31 - Luke Pelham (2); 6:04 - Karl Gagné (6); 7:32 - Mathieu Bétournay (10)		Second period	Jean-Michel Daoust (6) - pp - 9:53; Jean-Michel Daoust (7) - 15:31
No scoring		Third period	Sam Roberts (4) - 10:00
Corey Crawford (42 saves / 46 shots)		Goalie stats	David Tremblay (14 saves / 17 shots); Gabriel Bouthillette (13 saves / 15 shots)

May 9	Gatineau Olympiques	2 – 1	Moncton Wildcats	Centre Robert Guertin
No scoring		First period	No scoring
8:15 - pp - Guillaume Labrecque (9); 19:30 - Guillaume Labrecque (10)		Second period	Mathieu Bétournay (11) - 10:26
No scoring		Third period	No scoring
David Tremblay (27 saves / 28 shots)		Goalie stats	Corey Crawford (27 saves / 29 shots)

Gatineau wins series 4 – 1

== All-star teams ==
First team

- Goaltender - Martin Houle, Cape Breton Screaming Eagles
- Left Defence - Doug O'Brien, Gatineau Olympiques
- Right Defence - Jonathan Paiement, Lewiston Maineiacs
- Left Winger - Dany Roussin, Rimouski Océanic
- Centreman - Sidney Crosby, Rimouski Océanic
- Right Winger - Jean-Michel Daoust, Gatineau Olympiques
- Coach - Benoît Groulx, Gatineau Olympiques

Second team

- Goaltender - Corey Crawford, Moncton Wildcats
- Left Defence - Mathieu Dumas, Val-d'Or Foreurs
- Right Defence - Mario Scalzo, Victoriaville Tigres
- Left Winger - Alexandre Picard, Lewiston Maineiacs
- Centreman - Maxime Talbot, Gatineau Olympiques
- Right Winger - Steve Bernier, Moncton Wildcats
- Coach - Alain Vigneault, P.E.I. Rocket

Rookie team

- Goaltender - Julien Ellis, Shawinigan Cataractes
- Left Defence - Nathan Welton, Quebec Remparts
- Right Defence - Mathieu Carle, Acadie-Bathurst
- Left Winger - Guillaume Latendresse, Drummondville
- Centreman - Sidney Crosby, Rimouski Océanic
- Right Winger - Martins Karsums, Moncton Wildcats
- Coach - no eligible candidate
- List of First/Second/Rookie team all-stars.

== Trophies and awards ==
Team

- President's Cup - Playoff Champions, Gatineau Olympiques
- Jean Rougeau Trophy - Regular Season Champions, Gatineau Olympiques
- Luc Robitaille Trophy - Team that scored the most goals, Gatineau Olympiques
- Robert Lebel Trophy - Team with best GAA, Cape Breton Screaming Eagles

Player

- Michel Brière Memorial Trophy - Most Valuable Player, Sidney Crosby, Rimouski Océanic
- Jean Béliveau Trophy - Top Scorer, Sidney Crosby, Rimouski Océanic
- Guy Lafleur Trophy - Playoff MVP, Maxime Talbot, Gatineau Olympiques
- Telus Cup – Offensive - Offensive Player of the Year, Sidney Crosby, Rimouski Océanic
- Telus Cup – Defensive - Defensive Player of the Year, Corey Crawford, Moncton Wildcats
- Jacques Plante Memorial Trophy - Best GAA, Martin Houle, Cape Breton Screaming Eagles
- Emile Bouchard Trophy - Defenceman of the Year, Doug O'Brien, Gatineau Olympiques
- Mike Bossy Trophy - Best Pro Prospect, Alexandre Picard, Lewiston Maineiacs
- RDS Cup - Rookie of the Year, Sidney Crosby, Rimouski Océanic
- Michel Bergeron Trophy - Offensive Rookie of the Year, Sidney Crosby, Rimouski Océanic
- Raymond Lagacé Trophy - Defensive Rookie of the Year, Julien Ellis-Plante, Shawinigan Cataractes
- Frank J. Selke Memorial Trophy - Most sportsmanlike player, Benoît Mondou, Shawinigan Cataractes
- QMJHL Humanitarian of the Year - Humanitarian of the Year, Josh Hennessy, Quebec Remparts
- Marcel Robert Trophy - Best Scholastic Player, Nicolas Laplante, Acadie-Bathurst Titan
- Paul Dumont Trophy - Personality of the Year, Sidney Crosby, Rimouski Océanic

Executive

- Ron Lapointe Trophy - Coach of the Year, Benoît Groulx, Gatineau Olympiques
- John Horman Trophy - Executive of the Year, Sylvie Fortier, Baie-Comeau Drakkar
- Jean Sawyer Trophy - Marketing Director of the Year, Johanne Lefebvre, Baie-Comeau Drakkar

== See also ==
- 2004 Memorial Cup
- 2004 NHL entry draft
- 2003–04 OHL season
- 2003–04 WHL season

Preceded by 2002–03 QMJHL season	QMJHL seasons	Succeeded by 2004–05 QMJHL season
