= Haščák =

Haščák is a Slovak surname. Notable people with the surname include:

- Barbara Haščáková (1979-2023), Slovak singer
- Dávid Haščák (born 1998), Slovak football midfielder
- Marcel Haščák (born 1987), Slovak ice hockey player
- Marek Haščák (born 1985), Slovak ice hockey player
