= Benoit Groulx (ice hockey) =

Canadian ice hockey player and coach (born 1968)

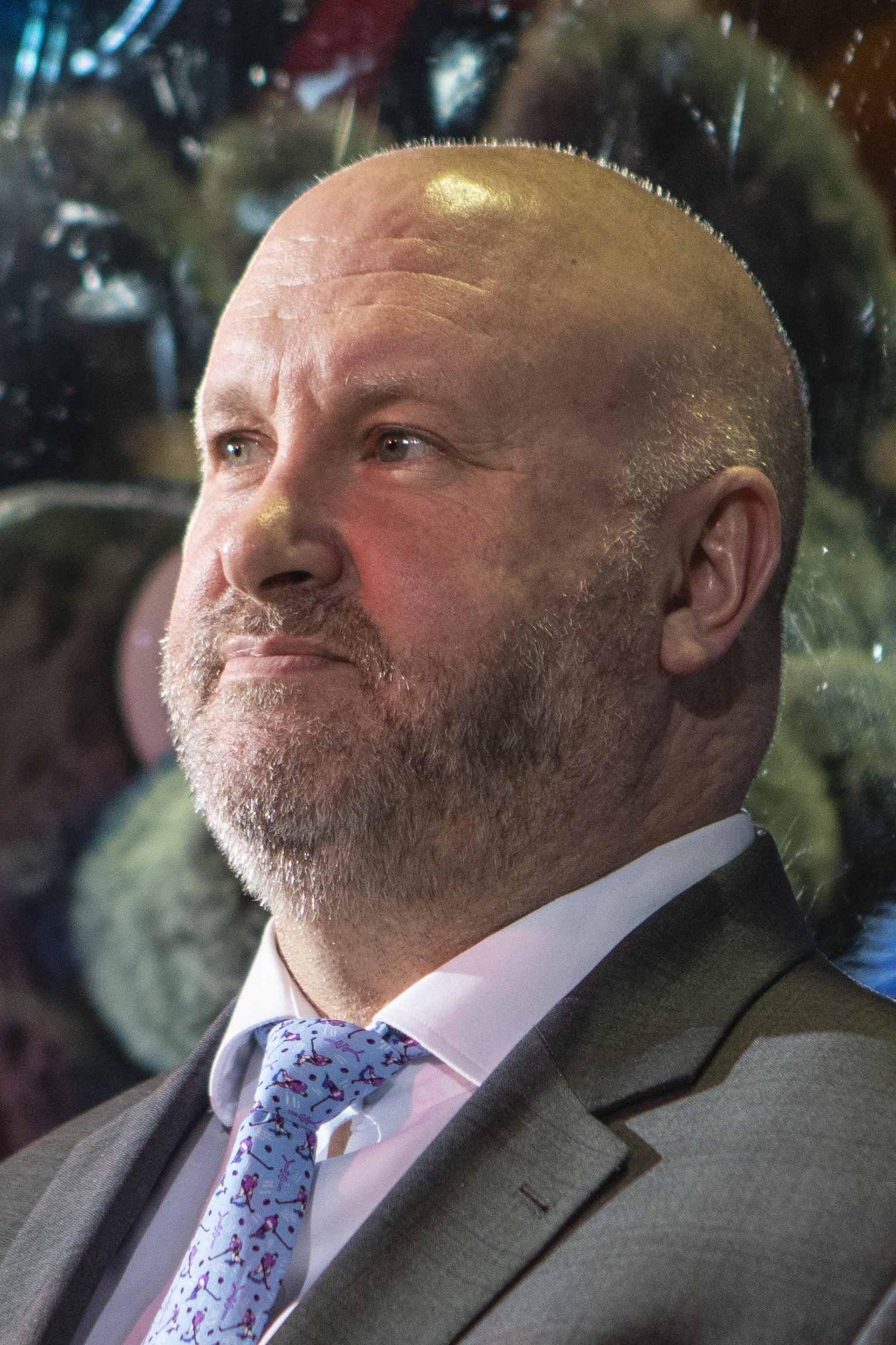
- Groulx in 2019
- Born: January 30, 1968 (age 58) Hull, Quebec, Canada
- Height: 5 ft 10 in (178 cm)
- Weight: 192 lb (87 kg; 13 st 10 lb)
- Position: Centre
- Shot: Left
- Played for: Viry-Châtillon EH; Brest Albatros Hockey; Dragons de Rouen
- Playing career: 1989–2000
- Coaching career: 2000–present

Benoit Groulx (born January 30, 1968) is a Canadian former professional ice hockey player. He is currently serving as the head coach of EV Zug of the National League (NL). Groulx is formerly the head coach of Traktor Chelyabinsk of the Kontinental Hockey League (KHL), and of the Rochester Americans and Syracuse Crunch of the AHL, along with being the former head coach and general manager for the Gatineau Olympiques of the QMJHL.

== Playing career ==
Groulx played major junior hockey with the Granby Bisons of the QMJHL.

== Coaching career ==
In 2000, following an 11-year professional career played mostly in France, Groulx turned to coaching, taking an assistant position with the Shawinigan Cataractes of the QMJHL. He became a head coach during the 2000–01 QMJHL season when he replaced John Chabot to take the reins of the Hull Olympiques, which was changed to the Gatineau Olympiques in 2003 following the city's amalgamation in 2002, where he won the 2003–04 Ron Lapointe Trophy as the QMJHL coach of the year. He was a head coach in the American Hockey League with the Rochester Americans for both the 2008–09 and 2009–10 AHL seasons, but re-join the Gatineau Olympiques in 2010.

After serving as assistant coach under Brent Sutter at the 2014 World Junior Championships, he was named head coach for Team Canada for the 2015 World Junior Championships.

Groulx was named head coach of the Syracuse Crunch on May 10, 2016, replacing Rob Zettler. In his first season as head coach, he led the Crunch to the Calder Cup Finals and an Eastern Conference title. His second season as head coach of the Crunch was also success. His Crunch had a 10-game winning streak and a 7-game win streak at certain points, in which the 10-game win streak lasted from November 22, 2017 to December 15, 2017. The 7-game win streak lasted from March 14, 2018 to March 30, 2018. He also led the Crunch to their highest win percentage in franchise history, a .658 win percentage. The Crunch easily did away with Rochester in the first round sweeping the Americans, 3–0. However, the Crunch were swept by the eventual Calder Cup Champions, the Toronto Marlies, 4–0, in the second round. In the following season, the Crunch had their best regular season in their history, but were upset in round 1 by the Cleveland Monsters.

Groulx achieved 200 professional coaching wins on March 30, 2019 while coaching the Syracuse Crunch. The Crunch beat the Utica Comets 6–2.

Groulx is the winningest coach in Syracuse Crunch history, with 221 career coaching wins with the Crunch.

During the 2021 Syracuse Crunch training camp, Groulx fractured his left elbow after falling down at practice.

In 2021, Groulx interviewed for the head coach position of the Arizona Coyotes, after a vacancy was left by Rick Tocchet. He would not get the job, as Arizona hired André Tourigny.

On February 21, 2022, Groulx won his 200th career game with the Crunch.

Award	Year
Ron Lapointe Trophy - QMJHL Coach of the Year	2003–04
AHL All-Star Game North Division Coach	2016–17, 2018–19

== Personal life ==
Groulx's son, Benoit-Olivier, also known as "Bo", was selected 54th overall by the Anaheim Ducks in the 2018 NHL entry draft.

== Coaching record ==
=== AHL ===
Team	Season	Regular Season							Post Season
Team	Season	G	W	L	T	OTL/SOL	Pts	Finish	Result
ROC	2008–09	80	29	43	—	8	66	7th, North	Missed Playoffs
ROC	2009–10	80	44	33	—	3	91	2nd, North	Lost in Round 1
SYR	2016–17	76	38	24	—	14	90	1st, North	Lost in Calder Cup Finals
SYR	2017–18	76	46	22	—	8	100	2nd, North	Lost in Round 2
SYR	2018–19	76	47	21	—	8	102	1st, North	Lost in Round 1
SYR	2019–20	62	30	23	—	9	69	5th, North	Season Cancelled
SYR	2020–21	32	19	10	—	3	41	3rd, North	No playoffs were held
SYR	2021-22	76	41	26	—	9	91	2nd, North	Lost in Round 1
SYR	2022–23	72	35	26	—	11	81	2nd, North	Lost in Round 1

=== QMJHL ===
Team	Season	Regular Season							Post Season
Team	Season	G	W	L	T	OTL	Pts	Finish	Result
HULL	2002–03	72	39	27	4	2	84	2nd, Ouest	Won QMJHL; Lost Canadian Hockey League Championship
GAT	2003–04	70	50	13	7	0	107	1st, Ouest	Won QMJHL; Lost Canadian Hockey League Championship
GAT	2004–05	70	33	28	5	4	75	3rd, Ouest	Lost in Round 2
GAT	2005–06	70	40	23	—	7	87	4th, West	Lost in Round 3
GAT	2006–07	70	39	27	—	4	82	3rd, West	Lost in Round 1
GAT	2007–08	70	43	19	—	8	94	4th, West	Won QMJHL; Placed 4th in Canadian Hockey League Championship
GAT	2010–11	68	43	17	—	8	94	3rd, West	Lost in QMJHL Finals
GAT	2011–12	68	26	32	—	10	62	4th, West	Lost in Round 1
GAT	2012–13	68	29	34	—	5	63	5th, West	Lost in Round 2
GAT	2013–14	68	41	23	—	4	86	4th, West	Lost in Round 2
GAT	2014–15	68	31	31	—	6	68	5th, West	Lost in Round 2
GAT	2015–16	68	46	19	—	3	95	3rd, West	Lost in Round 2
