= Zbyněk Hrdel =

Czech ice hockey player

- Born: August 19, 1985 (age 40) Písek, Czechoslovakia
- Height: 6 ft 3 in (191 cm)
- Weight: 209 lb (95 kg; 14 st 13 lb)
- Position: Forward
- Shot: Right
- Played for: Springfield Falcons; Norfolk Admirals; HC Sparta Praha; BK Mladá Boleslav; HC Kladno; Dunaújvárosi Acélbikák; Gothiques d'Amiens
- NHL draft: 286th overall, 2003; Tampa Bay Lightning
- Playing career: 2005–2016

Zbyněk Hrdel (born August 19, 1985) is a Czech former professional ice hockey player. He was selected by the Tampa Bay Lightning in the 9th round (286th overall) of the 2003 NHL entry draft.

Hrdel played with BK Mladá Boleslav in the Czech Extraliga during the 2010–11 Czech Extraliga season.

== Career statistics ==
=== Regular season and playoffs ===
			Regular season					Playoffs
Season	Team	League	GP	G	A	Pts	PIM	GP	G	A	Pts	PIM
1999–2000	HC Tábor	CZE.2 U18	13	6	6	12	10	—	—	—	—	—
2000–01	HC Sparta Praha	CZE U18	46	11	11	22	22	—	—	—	—	—
2001–02	HC Sparta Praha	CZE U18	31	24	19	43	38	6	4	3	7	2
2002–03	Rimouski Océanic	QMJHL	65	10	14	24	131	—	—	—	—	—
2003–04	Rimouski Océanic	QMJHL	54	15	31	46	41	9	4	6	10	4
2004–05	Rimouski Océanic	QMJHL	56	23	35	58	47	13	8	7	15	10
2005–06	Springfield Falcons	AHL	46	5	10	15	22	—	—	—	—	—
2005–06	Johnstown Chiefs	ECHL	15	6	5	11	10	4	1	2	3	8
2006–07	Springfield Falcons	AHL	4	0	0	0	4	—	—	—	—	—
2006–07	Johnstown Chiefs	ECHL	65	13	23	36	67	2	2	0	2	0
2007–08	Norfolk Admirals	AHL	18	2	0	2	8	—	—	—	—	—
2007–08	Mississippi Sea Wolves	ECHL	16	5	3	8	10	2	0	0	0	4
2008–09	HC Sparta Praha	ELH	37	0	0	0	14	10	0	2	2	31
2008–09	HC Berounští Medvědi	CZE.2	2	0	1	1	25	—	—	—	—	—
2009–10	HC Sparta Praha	ELH	39	0	5	5	31	7	0	1	1	6
2009–10	HC Berounští Medvědi	CZE.2	9	1	1	2	43	—	—	—	—	—
2010–11	KLH Chomutov	CZE.2	23	2	1	3	50	12	3	3	6	18
2010–11	BK Mladá Boleslav	ELH	17	4	4	8	16	—	—	—	—	—
2011–12	BK Mladá Boleslav	ELH	28	3	2	5	10	—	—	—	—	—
2012–13	BK Mladá Boleslav	CZE.2	19	3	2	5	14	6	2	0	2	2
2012–13	HC Medvědi Beroun 1933	CZE.2	28	9	14	23	38	—	—	—	—	—
2013–14	HC Medvědi Beroun 1933	CZE.2	48	6	15	21	110	6	2	0	2	2
2013–14	Rytíři Kladno	ELH	1	0	0	0	0	—	—	—	—	—
2014–15	Dunaújvárosi Acélbikák	MOL	7	3	5	8	6	—	—	—	—	—
2014–15	EC Peiting	GER.3	19	7	20	27	20	6	5	2	7	4
2015–16	Gothiques d'Amiens	FRA	16	0	4	4	8	5	0	0	0	4
2021–22	HC Milevsko 1934	CZE.4
AHL totals			68	7	10	17	34	—	—	—	—	—
ELH totals			122	7	11	18	71	17	0	3	3	37
CZE.2 totals			129	21	34	55	280	18	5	3	8	20

=== International ===
Year	Team	Event	GP	G	A	Pts	PIM
2003	Czech Republic	WJC18	6	1	0	1	29
2005	Czech Republic	WJC	7	1	0	1	4
Junior totals			13	2	0	2	33
