= Jimmy Bonneau =

Canadian ice hockey player (born 1985)

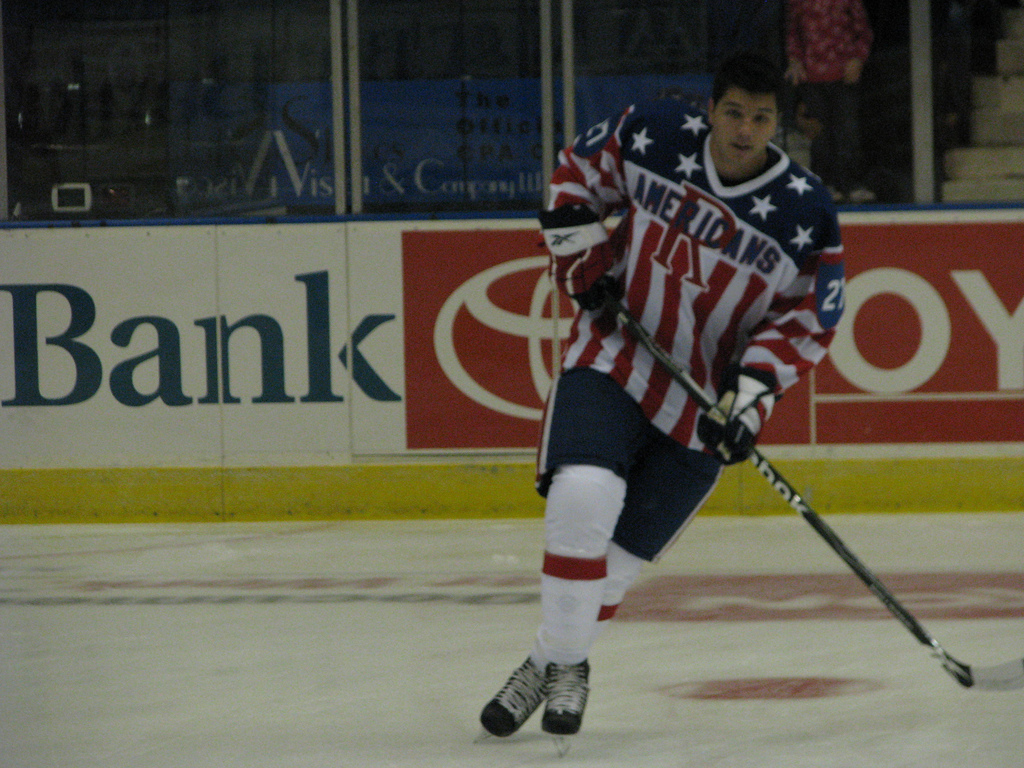
- Bonneau with the Rochester Americans in 2009
- Born: March 22, 1985 (age 41) Baie-Comeau, Quebec, Canada
- Height: 6 ft 3 in (191 cm)
- Weight: 225 lb (102 kg; 16 st 1 lb)
- Position: Left wing
- Shot: Right
- Played for: Hamilton Bulldogs; Portland Pirates; Rochester Americans; Worcester Sharks
- NHL draft: 241st overall, 2003; Montreal Canadiens
- Playing career: 2005–2016

Jimmy Bonneau (born March 22, 1985) is a Canadian former professional hockey forward who is currently working as a pro scout for the San Jose Sharks of the National Hockey League (NHL). He was selected in the eighth round, 241st overall, by the Montreal Canadiens in the 2003 NHL entry draft.

== Playing career ==
Bonneau played major junior hockey starting with the Montreal Rocket in the Quebec Major Junior Hockey League and the next two seasons with the same franchise after it moved to Prince Edward Island. During the 2005–06 season, he played for Long Beach Ice Dogs in ECHL. In the 2006–07 and 2007–08 seasons, he split time with the Hamilton Bulldogs of the American Hockey League and the Cincinnati Cyclones of the ECHL.

After spending two seasons with various organizations, he signed an AHL contract on July 2, 2010, with Hamilton to bring him back to the Canadiens' organization.

On September 27, 2011, Bonneau was signed as a free agent by the AHL's Worcester Sharks. After four seasons with the Worcester Sharks, including their last season as a franchise in 2014–15, Bonneau was a free agent in the off-season signed a one-year deal in the ECHL with the Rapid City Rush on August 18, 2015. He announced his retirement on April 10, 2016.

== Coaching career ==
Bonneau was hired as an associate coach for the San Jose Barracuda in the American Hockey League (AHL) in 2018 and was named a co-head coach of the team during the 2019–20 season. When regular head coach Roy Sommer returned to his post on September 22, 2020, Bonneau reverted to his assistant duties.

== Career statistics ==
			Regular season					Playoffs
Season	Team	League	GP	G	A	Pts	PIM	GP	G	A	Pts	PIM
2001–02	Jonquière Élites	QMAAA	40	5	10	15	55	—	—	—	—	—
2002–03	Montreal Rocket	QMJHL	65	1	5	6	261	7	0	0	0	12
2003–04	P.E.I. Rocket	QMJHL	70	7	12	19	263	11	1	0	1	12
2004–05	P.E.I. Rocket	QMJHL	70	11	11	22	234	—	—	—	—	—
2005–06	Long Beach Ice Dogs	ECHL	65	1	5	6	137	—	—	—	—	—
2006–07	Hamilton Bulldogs	AHL	9	0	0	0	59	—	—	—	—	—
2006–07	Cincinnati Cyclones	ECHL	46	2	5	7	89	10	0	0	0	23
2007–08	Hamilton Bulldogs	AHL	6	1	0	1	5	—	—	—	—	—
2007–08	Cincinnati Cyclones	ECHL	18	0	4	4	61	3	0	0	0	0
2008–09	Portland Pirates	AHL	46	0	6	6	122	—	—	—	—	—
2009–10	Rochester Americans	AHL	57	4	2	6	187	—	—	—	—	—
2010–11	Hamilton Bulldogs	AHL	77	1	2	3	180	15	1	2	3	16
2011–12	Worcester Sharks	AHL	54	2	3	5	168	—	—	—	—	—
2012–13	Worcester Sharks	AHL	26	1	0	1	81	—	—	—	—	—
2013–14	Worcester Sharks	AHL	45	2	3	5	106	—	—	—	—	—
2014–15	Worcester Sharks	AHL	30	0	3	3	80	—	—	—	—	—
2015–16	Rapid City Rush	ECHL	46	1	4	5	73	—	—	—	—	—
ECHL totals			175	4	18	22	360	13	0	0	0	23
AHL totals			348	11	19	30	988	15	1	2	3	16
