= Rob Zettler =

Canadian ice hockey player

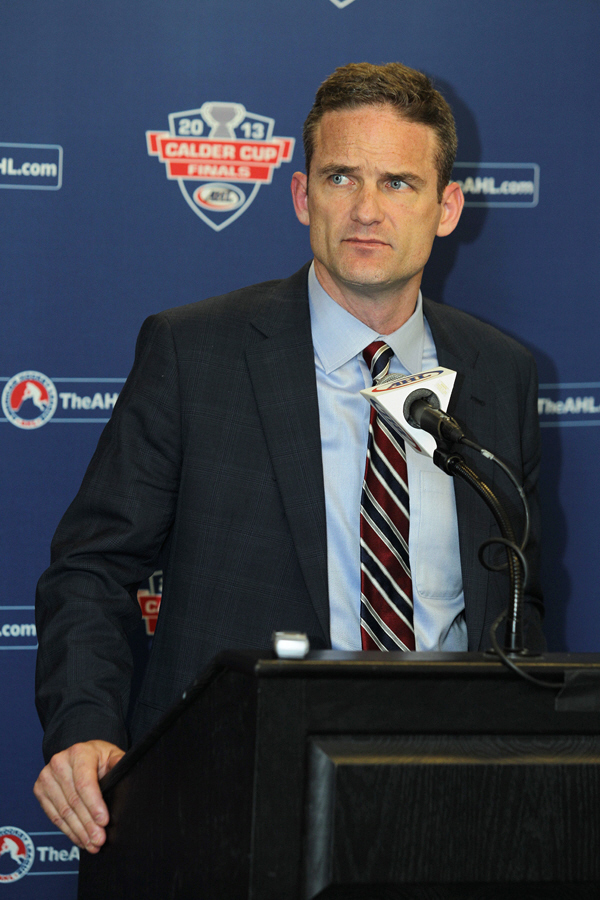
- Zettler in 2013
- Born: March 8, 1968 (age 58) Sept-Îles, Quebec, Canada
- Height: 6 ft 3 in (191 cm)
- Weight: 199 lb (90 kg; 14 st 3 lb)
- Position: Defence
- Shot: Left
- Played for: Minnesota North Stars; San Jose Sharks; Philadelphia Flyers; Toronto Maple Leafs; Nashville Predators; Washington Capitals
- Current NHL coach: Tampa Bay Lightning (Assistant)
- NHL draft: 55th overall, 1986; Minnesota North Stars
- Playing career: 1988–2002
- Coaching career: 2002–present

Rob Zettler (born March 8, 1968) is a Canadian former professional ice hockey defenceman and current assistant coach with the Tampa Bay Lightning of the National Hockey League. He played 14 seasons in the NHL with the Minnesota North Stars, San Jose Sharks, Philadelphia Flyers, Toronto Maple Leafs, Nashville Predators and Washington Capitals.

== Playing career ==
Zettler was drafted 55th overall by the Minnesota North Stars in the 1986 NHL entry draft.

After two seasons with the North Stars organization, he was claimed by the San Jose Sharks in the 1991 NHL Dispersal Draft. On February 1, 1994, the Sharks traded Zettler to the Philadelphia Flyers in exchange for Viacheslav Butsayev.

Philadelphia traded him to the Toronto Maple Leafs for a fifth-round pick in the 1996 NHL entry draft on July 8, 1995. With Toronto Zettler enjoyed his most productive season in 1996-97, scoring 2 goals and adding 12 assists for 14 points. After being left unprotected by the Maple Leafs he was claimed by the Nashville Predators in the 1998 NHL Expansion Draft.

On September 7, 1999, Zettler signed as a free agent with the Washington Capitals.

Rob Zettler announced his retirement on August 27, 2002, he finished his NHL career with 569 games, scoring 5 goals and 65 assists for 70 points.

== Post-playing career ==
He had been an assistant coach under Ron Wilson, but was relieved of his duties after Wilson's firing. He has also been an assistant coach for the San Jose Sharks (under former San Jose and former Toronto head coach Ron Wilson). Zettler also served as colour commentator for Washington Capitals radio broadcasts and provided commentaries on San Jose Sharks radio broadcasts before becoming an assistant coach. While a member of the Sharks coaching staff, he provided insight into games during telecasts with updates before the start of the second and third periods. On March 2, 2012, Zettler was again relieved of his position of assistant coach to Ron Wilson in favour of another position within the Toronto Maple Leafs organization.

In July 2012, Zettler was hired by the Tampa Bay Lightning to be an assistant coach with their AHL affiliate, the Syracuse Crunch. After the promotion of Jon Cooper on March 25, 2013, Zettler was named the head coach of the Crunch.

Although Zettler coached the Crunch to their first ever Calder Cup Finals appearance in 2013, Zettler had minimal success as head coach of the Crunch. In three full seasons as head coach of the Crunch, Zettler led the Crunch to one playoff appearance in that time frame, in which they were swept by the Wilkes-Barre/Scranton Penguins in round one of the 2015 Calder Cup playoffs. On May 10, 2016, the Syracuse Crunch announced the hiring of Benoit Groulx to replace Zettler as head coach of the team.

On July 3, 2017, Zettler was hired as an assistant coach for the San Jose Sharks, replacing Bob Boughner, who was hired as head coach of the Florida Panthers on June 12, 2017. When Boughner returned to the Sharks on May 29, 2019, he filled Zettler's position on the staff.

On December 7, 2020, Zettler returned to the Lightning organization, becoming an assistant coach under head coach Jon Cooper once again.

== Career statistics ==
=== Regular season and playoffs ===
			Regular season					Playoffs
Season	Team	League	GP	G	A	Pts	PIM	GP	G	A	Pts	PIM
1983–84	Sault Ste. Marie Legion	GNML	40	9	24	33	28	—	—	—	—	—
1984–85	Sault Ste. Marie Greyhounds	OHL	60	2	14	16	37	16	0	2	2	8
1985–86	Sault Ste. Marie Greyhounds	OHL	57	5	23	28	92	—	—	—	—	—
1986–87	Sault Ste. Marie Greyhounds	OHL	64	13	22	35	89	4	0	0	0	0
1987–88	Sault Ste. Marie Greyhounds	OHL	64	7	41	48	77	6	2	2	4	9
1987–88	Kalamazoo Wings	IHL	2	0	1	1	0	7	0	2	2	2
1988–89	Kalamazoo Wings	IHL	80	5	21	26	79	6	0	1	1	26
1988–89	Minnesota North Stars	NHL	2	0	0	0	0	—	—	—	—	—
1989–90	Kalamazoo Wings	IHL	41	6	10	16	64	7	0	0	0	6
1989–90	Minnesota North Stars	NHL	31	0	8	8	45	—	—	—	—	—
1990–91	Minnesota North Stars	NHL	47	1	4	5	119	—	—	—	—	—
1990–91	Kalamazoo Wings	IHL	1	0	0	0	2	—	—	—	—	—
1991–92	San Jose Sharks	NHL	74	1	8	9	99	—	—	—	—	—
1992–93	San Jose Sharks	NHL	80	0	7	7	150	—	—	—	—	—
1993–94	San Jose Sharks	NHL	42	0	3	3	65	—	—	—	—	—
1993–94	Philadelphia Flyers	NHL	33	0	4	4	69	—	—	—	—	—
1994–95	Philadelphia Flyers	NHL	32	0	1	1	34	1	0	0	0	2
1995–96	Toronto Maple Leafs	NHL	29	0	1	1	48	2	0	0	0	0
1996–97	Toronto Maple Leafs	NHL	48	2	12	14	51	—	—	—	—	—
1996–97	Utah Grizzlies	IHL	30	0	10	10	60	—	—	—	—	—
1997–98	Toronto Maple Leafs	NHL	59	0	7	7	108	—	—	—	—	—
1998–99	Utah Grizzlies	IHL	77	2	16	18	136	—	—	—	—	—
1998–99	Nashville Predators	NHL	2	0	0	0	2	—	—	—	—	—
1999–00	Portland Pirates	AHL	23	2	2	4	27	—	—	—	—	—
1999–00	Washington Capitals	NHL	12	0	2	2	19	5	0	0	0	2
2000–01	Portland Pirates	AHL	36	1	9	10	84	—	—	—	—	—
2000–01	Washington Capitals	NHL	29	0	4	4	55	6	0	0	0	0
2001–02	Washington Capitals	NHL	49	1	4	5	56	—	—	—	—	—
NHL totals			569	5	65	70	920	14	0	0	0	4

== Coaching record ==
Team	Year	Regular Season							Post Season
Team	Year	G	W	L	T	OTL	Pts	Finish	Result
SYR	2012–13	11	4	4	-	3	11	1st, East	Lost in Finals
SYR	2013–14	76	31	32	-	13	75	5th, East	Missed Playoffs
SYR	2014–15	76	41	25	-	10	92	2nd, Northeast	Lost in Round 1
SYR	2015–16	76	32	29	-	15	79	4th, North	Missed Playoffs
