= Olivier Labelle =

Canadian ice hockey player

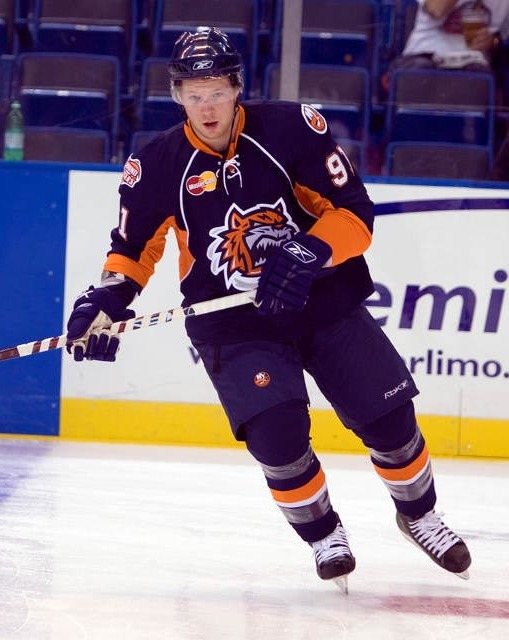
- Labelle with the Bridgeport Sound Tigers in 2007
- Born: July 15, 1985 (age 40) Saint-Eustache, Quebec, Canada
- Height: 6 ft 0 in (183 cm)
- Weight: 190 lb (86 kg; 13 st 8 lb)
- Position: Right wing
- Shoots: Right
- Magnus team Former teams: Boxers de Bordeaux; Syracuse Crunch; Bridgeport Sound Tigers; Manitoba Moose; Providence Bruins; Graz 99ers Dragons de Rouen
- NHL draft: Undrafted
- Playing career: 2006–present

Olivier Labelle (born July 15, 1985) is a Canadian former professional ice hockey forward.

== Playing career ==
Undrafted after playing major junior hockey in the Quebec Major Junior Hockey League, Labelle played his first professional season in 2006–07 under contract to the Syracuse Crunch of the American Hockey League .

On July 6, 2010, the Reading Royals re-signed Labelle to an ECHL contract. He was the team's first signee for the 2010–11 season. On November 19, 2010, the Reading Royals loaned Labelle to the Bridgeport Sound Tigers of the AHL.

After two seasons abroad in the Austrian Hockey League with the Graz 99ers, Labelle returned to familiar surroundings in signing as a free agent to a one-year deal with the Reading Royals on September 4, 2014.

Labelle experienced one year in France, playing with Dragons de Rouen of the Ligue Magnus, before opting for a return in a fifth season with the Reading Royals on June 22, 2016.

After another stint in the Ligue Magnus, Labelle again switched back to the ECHL for the 2018–19 season, agreeing to a one-year contract with the Indy Fuel on July 26, 2018. As an affiliate within the Chicago Blackhawks organization, Labelle made 56 appearances to finish with 15 goals and 40 points.

On July 15, 2019, Labelle on his 34th birthday agreed to return to the Reading Royals for his sixth season with the club. In the 2019–20 season, Labelle featured in just 4 games with the Royals before he was released from his contract on October 24, 2019. He returned to former French club, Boxers de Bordeaux on November 6, 2019.

== Career statistics ==
			Regular season					Playoffs
Season	Team	League	GP	G	A	Pts	PIM	GP	G	A	Pts	PIM
2002–03	Hull Olympiques	QMJHL	69	16	18	34	86	19	4	1	5	36
2003–04	Gatineau Olympiques	QMJHL	70	26	31	57	130	15	3	7	10	24
2004–05	Gatineau Olympiques	QMJHL	67	19	37	56	133	10	1	2	3	12
2005–06	Acadie-Bathurst Titan	QMJHL	67	50	50	100	185	17	5	10	15	35
2006–07	Syracuse Crunch	AHL	74	11	20	31	153	—	—	—	—	—
2007–08	Utah Grizzlies	ECHL	52	26	22	48	169	15	4	7	11	33
2007–08	Bridgeport Sound Tigers	AHL	8	1	0	1	13	—	—	—	—	—
2008–09	Victoria Salmon Kings	ECHL	56	16	19	35	128	9	4	3	7	32
2008–09	Manitoba Moose	AHL	6	0	2	2	11	—	—	—	—	—
2009–10	Reading Royals	ECHL	55	23	18	41	162	16	11	4	15	36
2009–10	Providence Bruins	AHL	2	0	0	0	0	—	—	—	—	—
2010–11	Reading Royals	ECHL	38	21	11	32	105	7	2	5	7	16
2010–11	Bridgeport Sound Tigers	AHL	34	3	2	5	74	—	—	—	—	—
2011–12	Reading Royals	ECHL	63	27	30	57	144	5	1	1	2	10
2011–12	Providence Bruins	AHL	2	0	0	0	2	—	—	—	—	—
2012–13	Graz 99ers	EBEL	42	18	16	34	98	5	2	1	3	10
2013–14	Graz 99ers	EBEL	40	5	12	17	64	—	—	—	—	—
2014–15	Reading Royals	ECHL	72	30	41	71	92	7	0	3	3	10
2015–16	Dragons de Rouen	FRA	26	11	14	25	36	15	6	5	11	24
2016–17	Reading Royals	ECHL	66	27	28	55	78	6	2	2	4	10
2016–17	Syracuse Crunch	AHL	6	0	0	0	4	—	—	—	—	—
2017–18	Boxers de Bordeaux	FRA	44	22	22	44	108	9	2	1	3	14
2018–19	Indy Fuel	ECHL	56	15	25	40	75	—	—	—	—	—
2019–20	Reading Royals	ECHL	4	0	1	1	2	—	—	—	—	—
AHL totals			132	15	24	39	257	—	—	—	—	—
