= Maxim Lapierre =

Canadian ice hockey player (born 1985)

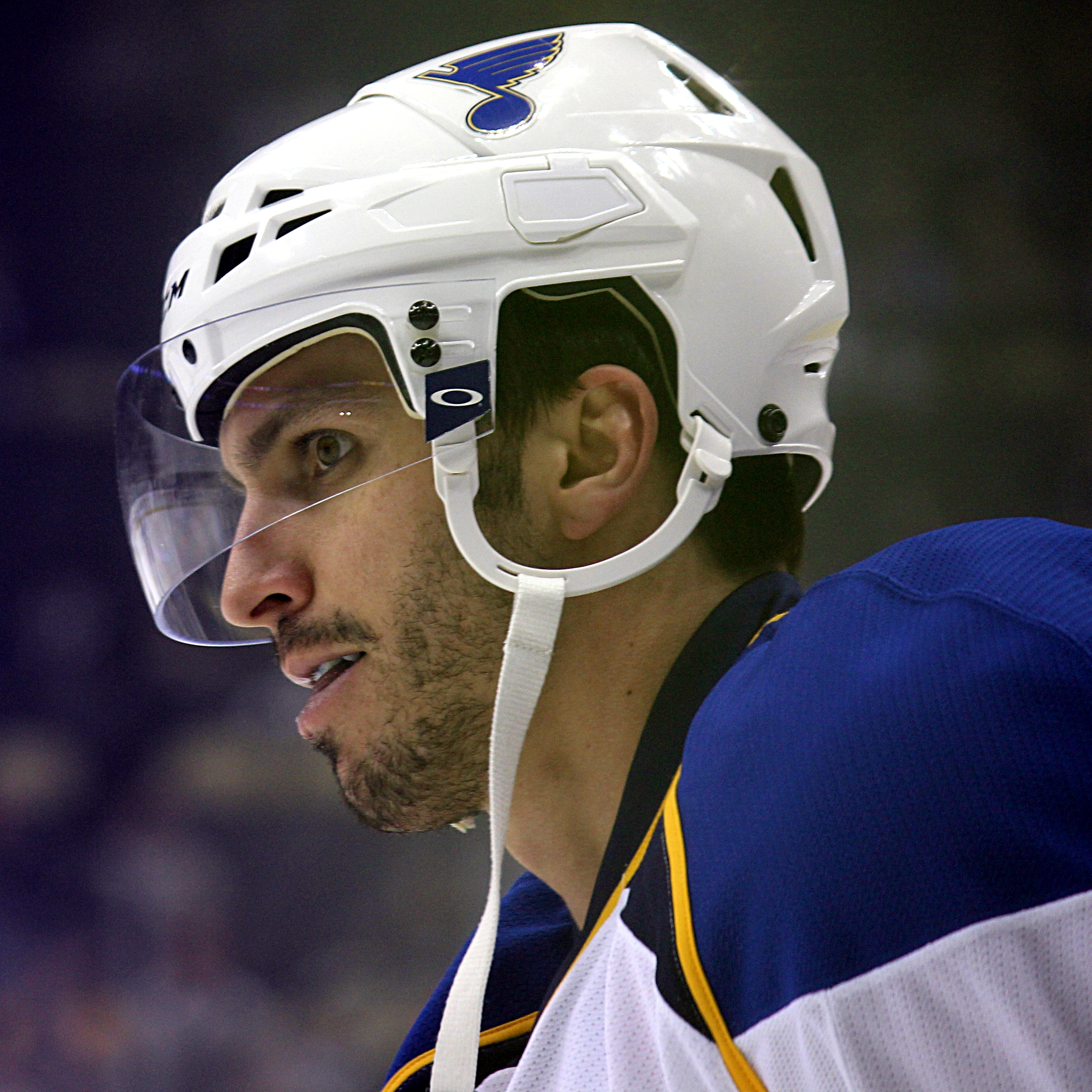
- Lapierre with the St. Louis Blues in March 2014
- Born: March 29, 1985 (age 41) Saint-Leonard, Quebec, Canada
- Height: 6 ft 2 in (188 cm)
- Weight: 215 lb (98 kg; 15 st 5 lb)
- Position: Centre
- Shot: Right
- Played for: Montreal Canadiens; Anaheim Ducks; Vancouver Canucks; St. Louis Blues; Pittsburgh Penguins; Modo Hockey; HC Lugano; Eisbären Berlin
- National team: Canada
- NHL draft: 61st overall, 2003; Montreal Canadiens
- Playing career: 2006–2020

Maxim Lapierre (born March 29, 1985) is a Canadian former professional ice hockey forward. Drafted out of the Quebec Major Junior Hockey League (QMJHL), he was selected in the second round, 61st overall, by the Montreal Canadiens in the 2003 NHL entry draft. He spent parts of his first three professional seasons with the Canadiens' minor league affiliate, the Hamilton Bulldogs of the American Hockey League (AHL), before playing his first full NHL season in 2008–09.

Lapierre spent five-and-a-half seasons in the Canadiens organization before being traded to the Anaheim Ducks in December 2010. Two months later, he was traded to the Vancouver Canucks and helped the team to the 2011 Stanley Cup Finals, where they lost to the Boston Bruins. On July 5, 2013, Lapierre signed with the St. Louis Blues as a free agent. On January 27, 2015, Lapierre was traded from St. Louis to the Pittsburgh Penguins in exchange for Marcel Goc.

== Early life ==
Lapierre was born in Saint-Leonard, Quebec and grew up in Repentigny, Quebec. Beginning to play hockey at age nine, Lapierre's midget team was based out of Cap-de-la-Madeleine, Quebec. One of his teammates, Jean-François Jacques, went on to play with him on the Hamilton Bulldogs, as well.

== Playing career ==
=== Junior ===
==== QMJHL ====
During the 2001–02 season, Lapierre made his Quebec Major Junior Hockey League (QMJHL) debut with the Montreal Rocket, appearing in nine games, during which time he scored two goals. Playing in his first full QMJHL season in 2002–03, Lapierre scored 22 goals and 43 points over 72 games. He added four points in seven playoff games. Following his rookie year in the juniors, Lapierre was selected in the second round, 61st overall, of the 2003 NHL entry draft by the Montreal Canadiens. Following his draft, Lapierre was returned to junior hockey early in the Canadiens' 2003 training camp. Upon returning, his QMJHL club had relocated to Charlottetown, Prince Edward Island, to become the P.E.I. Rocket in 2003–04. Lapierre recorded a junior career-high 61 points over 67 games in his third season with the Rocket. Remaining in junior ranks for a fourth season in 2004–05, he recorded 52 points over 69 games.

=== Professional ===
==== Montreal Canadiens (2005–2010) ====
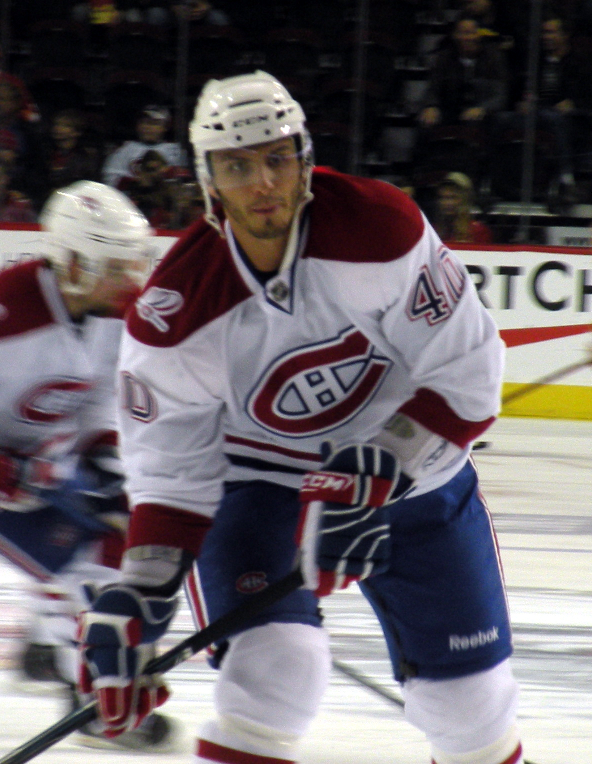
Lapierre as a member of the Montreal Canadiens in October 2009

In the off-season, he was signed by the Canadiens to a three-year, entry-level contract on July 28, 2005. Lapierre played his first professional season in the American Hockey League (AHL) with the Canadiens' minor league affiliate, the Hamilton Bulldogs. He was called up to the NHL in November 2005 for a five-day stint, playing his first NHL game on November 15 against the Florida Panthers. He registered three minutes of ice time in a 4–3 Canadiens win, his lone NHL game during the 2005–06 season. In the AHL, Lapierre recorded 13 goals and 36 points over 73 games with the Bulldogs.

During the 2006–07 season, Lapierre received four separate call-ups from Hamilton. Playing in the first game of a call-up in December, he registered his first career NHL point in a 4–3 win against the Boston Bruins, earning the first assist on the game-winning goal by Guillaume Latendresse on December 12, 2006. The following game, he scored his first NHL goal in a 4–2 win against the Tampa Bay Lightning, tipping a Mike Komisarek shot past goaltender Marc Denis. In late-January 2007, he received his last call-up of the campaign, remaining with the club until the end of the NHL regular season. Over 46 NHL games, he recorded six goals and six assists, while also tallying 24 points over 37 games in the AHL.

With Montreal not qualifying for the 2007 playoffs, Lapierre was sent back to the Bulldogs for their 2007 playoff season. Hamilton advanced to the Calder Cup Finals, where they defeated the Hershey Bears in five games. Lapierre scored a goal and an assist in Hamilton's 2–1 win in the championship-deciding game. He totaled 12 points (six goals and six assists) in 22 playoff games.

After competing for a Canadiens roster spot in the 2007 NHL pre-season, Lapierre was returned to the Bulldogs to start the 2007–08 season. On December 5, 2007, he was recalled to the Canadiens, earning a role as the club's third- or fourth-line centre. His time with the Canadiens increased as he spent 53 games in the NHL with seven goals and 18 points, while registering 14 points over 19 games in the AHL.

By the 2008–09 campaign, Lapierre had established himself as a full-time NHLer and earned a roster spot with the Canadiens out of training camp for the first time in his career. Just over a month into the season, he was elbowed in the head by opposing forward Jarkko Ruutu during a game against the Ottawa Senators on November 11, 2008. Lapierre was not injured on the play, while Ruutu received a two-game suspension for the infraction. The following month, Lapierre recorded a Gordie Howe hat trick (a goal, an assist and a fight) in a 6–2 win against the New York Rangers on December 4, 2008. Later that month, on December 29, 2008, Lapierre recorded his first career NHL hat-trick during a 5–2 win against the Florida Panthers. Lapierre had a career year in 2008–09, finishing with 15 goals and 13 assists for 28 points over 79 games. After going scoreless in four playoff games, as the Canadiens were eliminated in the first round by the Boston Bruins, it was revealed that Lapierre had played the majority of the season in pain with an ankle injury. He underwent surgery in the off-season, recovering in time for the 2009 training camp.

Lapierre's offensive production decreased to 14 points in 2009–10, his lowest total in the NHL since his rookie season. On March 5, 2010, Lapierre was suspended four games for a hit against opposing forward Scott Nichol during a game against the San Jose Sharks the previous day. Nichol left the game injured after Lapierre pushed him from behind, causing him to crash into the end boards. In addition to the suspension, Lapierre lost approximately $14,000 in pay, which went to the National Hockey League Players' Association (NHLPA)'s emergency fund. In the 2010 playoffs, Lapierre helped the Canadiens advance to the Eastern Conference Semi-finals, scoring goals in Game 6 of the first round against the Washington Capitals and the second round against the Pittsburgh Penguins, both elimination games. However, the Canadiens were eliminated in the third round by the Philadelphia Flyers in five games; Lapierre finished the playoff season with three goals and one assist in 19 games.

==== Anaheim and Vancouver (2010–2013) ====
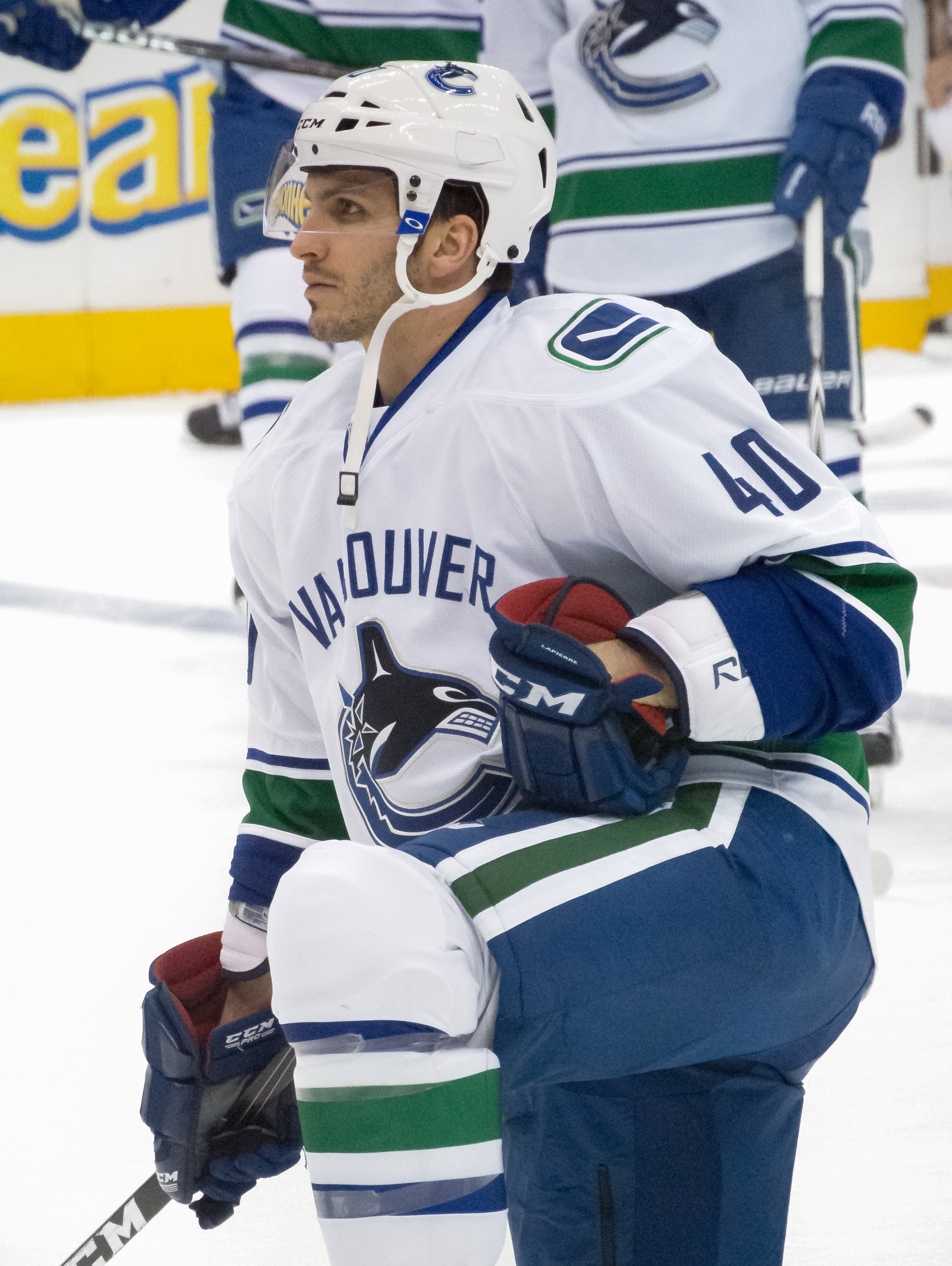
Lapierre with the Vancouver Canucks in January 2013

On December 31, 2010, after five-and-a-half seasons playing within the Canadiens organization, Lapierre was traded to the Anaheim Ducks in exchange for defenceman Brett Festerling and a fifth-round draft pick in 2012. He made his Ducks debut on January 5, 2011, in a 4–1 loss to the Nashville Predators. The following game, he recorded his first point as a Duck, assisting on a goal by Matt Beleskey in a 6–0 win against the Columbus Blue Jackets.

Lapierre played 21 games with the Ducks, recording three assists in that span, before being dealt again prior to the NHL trade deadline on February 28, 2011. He was sent to the Vancouver Canucks, along with forward MacGregor Sharp, in exchange for minor-league forward Joël Perrault and a third-round draft pick in 2012. Canucks' head coach Alain Vigneault had reportedly recommended Lapierre to general manager Mike Gillis, having coached Lapierre in the QMJHL. Upon his arrival in Vancouver, Lapierre's reputation as an agitator was addressed by Vigneault and he was asked to reduce activity in between whistles, such as trash talking and unnecessary hits. Lapierre scored his first goal as a Canuck on March 16, 2011, in a 4–2 win against the Colorado Avalanche. While the Canucks originally acquired Lapierre with the intention of playing him on the fourth line as a depth player, he soon moved up to the third with the eye injury of Manny Malhotra late in the season. Between Montreal, Anaheim and Vancouver, he finished the season with six goals and six assists over 78 games. Centring the third line with wingers Raffi Torres and Jannik Hansen during the 2011 playoffs, Lapierre added three goals and five points over all 25 games. He helped Vancouver reach the Stanley Cup Finals for the first time in 17 years. During Game 5 of the Finals against the Boston Bruins, Lapierre scored the only goal of the game against Bruins' goaltender Tim Thomas, helping Vancouver to a 1–0 win for a 3–2 lead in the series. Lapierre also recorded a goal in Game 6 although, despite having a chance to win the Stanley Cup in Game 6 in Boston, the Canucks would lose the game by a score of 5–2 to force a game seven in Vancouver. While the Canucks had a chance to redeem themselves and clinch the Cup in Game 7 on home ice, they would fall to the Bruins 4–0 for a 4–3 series defeat, one win short from winning the Stanley Cup.

Set to become a restricted free agent in the 2011 off-season, Lapierre was re-signed by Vancouver to a two-year, $2 million contract on June 27, 2011. Lapierre played all 82 games in the 2011–12 season with nine goals and 10 assists for 19 points recorded and leading the team in penalty minutes with 130 penalty minutes as the Canucks as a team continued their dominance by winning a second consecutive Presidents' Trophy. Despite their continued regular season success however, the Canucks would be upset in five games in the opening round of the 2012 playoffs by the eighth-seeded and eventual Stanley Cup champion Los Angeles Kings. Lapierre was held goalless and recorded only one assist for one point in all five games in the series.

==== St. Louis Blues (2013–2015) ====
After the completion of his contract with Vancouver, Lapierre agreed to a two-year, $2.2 million contract with the St. Louis Blues. On October 15, 2013, against the San Jose Sharks, Lapierre checked Dan Boyle into the boards, hospitalizing him and causing a fight between the two teams; Lapierre was ejected from the game. He was subsequently suspended, and a disciplinary hearing was held. Lapierre was suspended for five games by NHL director of player safety Brendan Shanahan on October 18, 2013.

==== Pittsburgh Penguins (2015) ====
On January 27, 2015, Lapierre was traded from the Blues to the Pittsburgh Penguins in exchange for Marcel Goc. As the Penguins narrowly qualified for the 2015 playoffs as the eighth seed in the East, Lapierre played a key role during the opening round matchup against the Presidents' Trophy-winning New York Rangers by getting under the skin of the Rangers by drawing penalties, instigating fights, taunting and most notably doing play-by-play towards the Rangers' bench. He also played an important role on the face-off dot and on the penalty kill, frustrating Rangers head coach and his former head coach in Vancouver, Alain Vigneault. The Rangers would eventually win the series in five games.

==== MODO (2015–2016) ====
On September 1, 2015, Lapierre signed a one-year contract with Modo Hockey of the Swedish Hockey League. The contract comes with an option for a second year. On January 20, 2016, Lapierre's asked for his contract to be terminated with Modo. After beginning the season with head coach Larry Hurras who was later relieved of his duties as Modo coach. Andreas Johansson the new coach brought in a system that was not favourable for Lapierre's style of play. Maxim Lapierre who was leading Modo in scoring posting 8G, 11A, 19P in 34 games asked for his contract to be formally terminated. Lapierre was the third NHL player to leave Modo during the 2015–16 season, both Ryan Whitney and Kyle Wilson left prior to Lapierre's departure as well.

==== HC Lugano (2016–2019) ====
On January 25, 2016, he signed a contract with HC Lugano of the Swiss National League for the remainder of the season.

On July 28, 2016, Lapierre, with ambition to make a comeback to the NHL, signed a professional try-out with the New York Rangers. At the completion of training camp and pre-season, Lapierre was released without a contract offer on October 5. On October 9, 2016, HC Lugano announced that Lapierre would be re-joining the team for the remainder of the season. At the conclusion of the 2017 playoffs, the team exercised Lapierre's option on his contract for the 2017–18 season. On October 5, 2017, Lapierre agreed to a one-year contract extension with HC Lugano, valid through the 2018–19 season.

On December 5, 2018, Lapierre agreed to a two-year contract extension with Lugano through the 2020–21 season. On July 13, 2019, Lapierre and HC Lugano mutually agreed to part ways, despite a valid contract for the next two seasons.

==== Eisbären Berlin (2019–2020) ====
Lapierre opted to remain in Europe, continuing his career on a two-year contract with German outfit Eisbären Berlin of the DEL on July 14, 2019. On December 6, 2020, Lapierre announced his retirement from professional ice hockey.

== International play ==
Medal record

Representing Canada

Ice hockey

Olympic Games
Bronze medal – third place	2018 Pyeongchang	

Lapierre earned a spot on the Canadian national team in the 2018 Winter Olympics after successful playing in the 2017 Spengler Cup tournament. Lapierre scored his first career Olympic goal in Canada's 4–0 win over the South Korean national team. Lapierre won a bronze medal during these Olympics.

== Playing style ==
Lapierre was known primarily as a checking forward, centring either the third or fourth line. He had a reputation as an agitator, distracting and provoking opposing players to take penalties. He played with an aggressive edge and led all Canadiens forwards in hits in 2009–10, his last full season with the club. Defensively responsible, he earned time on the penalty kill. In 2008–09, he ranked third on the Canadiens in average short-handed time on ice per game.

During the Canucks run to the 2011 Stanley Cup Final and the back-to-back Presidents' Trophy-winning seasons in 2010–11 and 2011–12, Lapierre (along with Canuck teammates Ryan Kesler, Alexandre Burrows and Kevin Bieksa) were widely known as some of the most frustrating players to play against.

== Career statistics ==
=== Regular season and playoffs ===
			Regular season					Playoffs
Season	Team	League	GP	G	A	Pts	PIM	GP	G	A	Pts	PIM
2001–02	Cap-de-la-Madeleine Estacades	QMAAA	42	14	27	41	44	10	3	5	8	16
2001–02	Montreal Rocket	QMJHL	9	2	0	2	2	—	—	—	—	—
2002–03	Montreal Rocket	QMJHL	72	22	21	43	55	7	1	3	4	6
2003–04	PEI Rocket	QMJHL	67	25	36	61	138	11	7	2	9	14
2004–05	PEI Rocket	QMJHL	69	25	27	52	139	—	—	—	—	—
2005–06	Hamilton Bulldogs	AHL	73	13	23	36	214	—	—	—	—	—
2005–06	Montreal Canadiens	NHL	1	0	0	0	0	—	—	—	—	—
2006–07	Hamilton Bulldogs	AHL	37	11	13	24	59	22	6	6	12	41
2006–07	Montreal Canadiens	NHL	46	6	6	12	24	—	—	—	—	—
2007–08	Hamilton Bulldogs	AHL	19	7	7	14	63	—	—	—	—	—
2007–08	Montreal Canadiens	NHL	53	7	11	18	60	12	0	3	3	6
2008–09	Montreal Canadiens	NHL	79	15	13	28	76	4	0	0	0	26
2009–10	Montreal Canadiens	NHL	76	7	7	14	61	19	3	1	4	20
2010–11	Montreal Canadiens	NHL	38	5	3	8	63	—	—	—	—	—
2010–11	Anaheim Ducks	NHL	21	0	3	3	9	—	—	—	—	—
2010–11	Vancouver Canucks	NHL	19	1	0	1	8	25	3	2	5	66
2011–12	Vancouver Canucks	NHL	82	9	10	19	130	5	0	1	1	16
2012–13	Vancouver Canucks	NHL	48	4	6	10	44	4	0	0	0	6
2013–14	St. Louis Blues	NHL	71	9	6	15	78	6	1	1	2	4
2014–15	St. Louis Blues	NHL	45	2	7	9	16	—	—	—	—	—
2014–15	Pittsburgh Penguins	NHL	35	0	2	2	16	5	0	0	0	0
2015–16	Modo Hockey	SHL	34	8	11	19	34	—	—	—	—	—
2015–16	HC Lugano	NLA	6	2	2	4	37	15	1	3	4	88
2016–17	HC Lugano	NLA	28	8	8	16	79	10	2	5	7	38
2017–18	HC Lugano	NL	49	15	20	35	56	18	10	13	23	12
2018–19	HC Lugano	NL	45	9	20	29	112	4	1	1	2	16
2019–20	Eisbären Berlin	DEL	50	11	23	34	30	—	—	—	—	—
NHL totals			614	65	74	139	586	80	7	8	15	144

=== International ===
Year	Team	Event	Result	GP	G	A	Pts	PIM
2018	Canada	OG	3rd place, bronze medalist(s)	6	1	0	1	0
Senior totals				6	1	0	1	0
