= Jeff Deslauriers =

Canadian ice hockey player (born 1984)

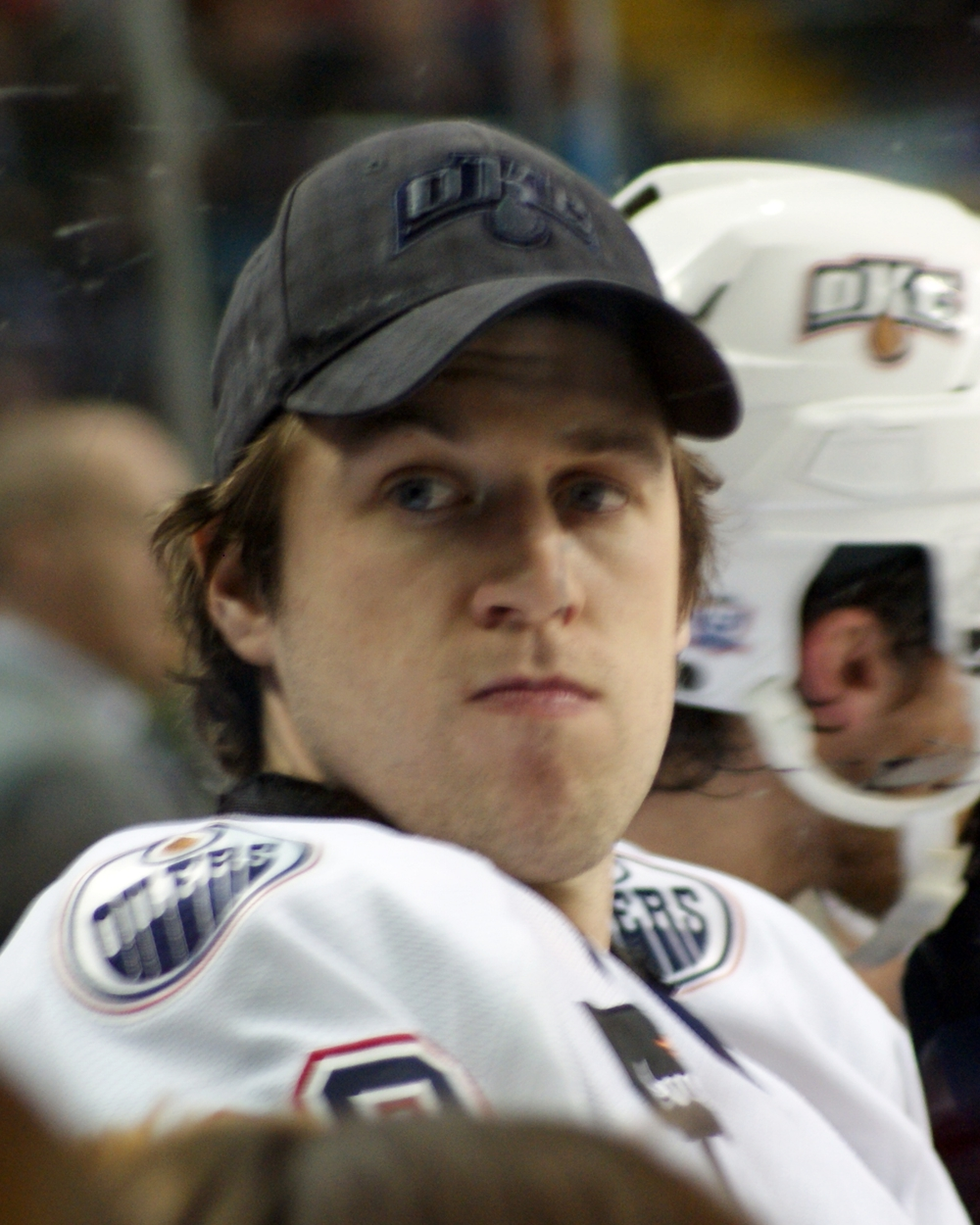
- Deslauriers with the Oklahoma City Barons in 2011
- Born: May 15, 1984 (age 42) Saint-Jean-sur-Richelieu, Quebec, Canada
- Height: 6 ft 4 in (193 cm)
- Weight: 201 lb (91 kg; 14 st 5 lb)
- Position: Goaltender
- Caught: Right
- Played for: Edmonton Oilers; Anaheim Ducks; Dinamo Riga; Augsburger Panther
- NHL draft: 31st overall, 2002; Edmonton Oilers
- Playing career: 2004–2016

Jeff Drouin-Deslauriers (born May 15, 1984) is a Canadian former professional ice hockey goaltender who played in the National Hockey League (NHL) with the Edmonton Oilers and Anaheim Ducks. Deslauriers was selected by the Oilers in the second round of the 2002 NHL entry draft with the 31st overall pick.

== Playing career ==
=== Junior and minor league career ===
Deslauriers was selected from Chicoutimi of the QMJHL, where he was the starting goaltender for three seasons. The 2004–05 season was Deslauriers' first professional experience. He split time between the Edmonton Road Runners of the AHL and the Greenville Grrrowl of the ECHL. It was not a good season for Deslauriers, as he fought injury problems and played for an AHL team that failed to make the playoffs. In the 2005–06 season, due to the Oilers not having a farm team, Deslauriers only played 13 games and struggled, before being sent down once again to Greenville. The 2006–07 season was a turnaround, however. Deslauriers was back in the AHL with the Wilkes-Barre/Scranton Penguins and eventually became the team's starting goaltender. He played well and ranked among the top goaltenders in the league.

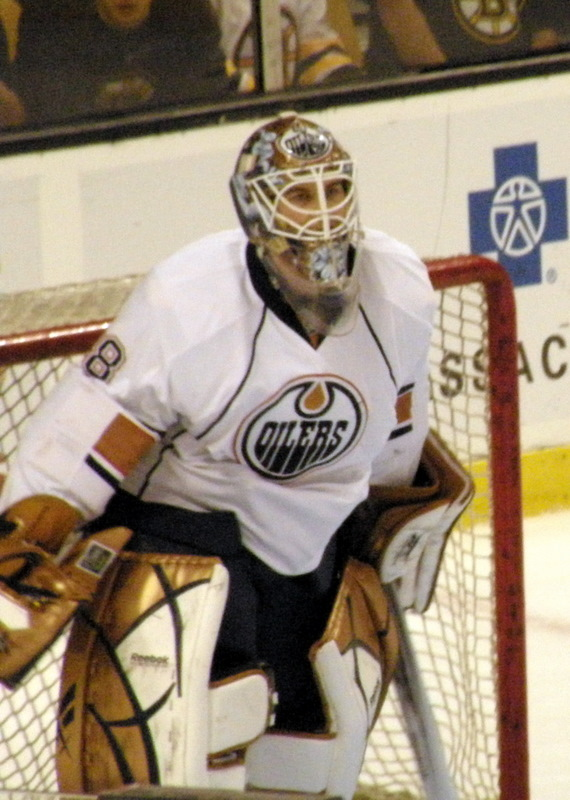
Deslauriers in an Edmonton Oilers uniform in 2009

=== Edmonton Oilers (2008–10) ===
On October 17, 2008, Deslauriers earned his first NHL win in a 4–3 victory over the Calgary Flames. Over the course of his first four appearances, he put up sparkling numbers, including a 3–0 record with a 1.50 goals allowed average and a .951 save percentage. However, after two games where he allowed four goals or more and as a result of the three-headed goaltending carousel of Dwayne Roloson and Mathieu Garon, he was relegated to the bench and occasional rehab stints in the AHL. With the trade of Garon to the Pittsburgh Penguins, however, he regained his full-time backup position as Edmonton's number two goalie.

Following the 2008–09 season, Roloson left the Oilers via free agency and the Oilers replaced him with veteran goalie, Nikolai Khabibulin. Deslauriers was to be his back-up and he started off the season with limited playing time. He played just three times in Edmonton's first 21 games, but posted respectable stats, going 1–1–1 with a 1.96 goals allowed average and a .937 save percentage. Shortly after his third start, Khabibulin was injured and Deslauriers went on to start 14 straight games in his absence, but with less impressive statistics. In January 2010, the Oilers announced that Khabibulin would undergo season-ending surgery, thrusting Deslauriers into the starting role. After an unspectacular year as the Oilers number one goalie, Deslauriers had to battle in training camp for the back-up role against Devan Dubnyk and former NHLer, Martin Gerber. At first, the Oilers decided to keep both Dubnyk and Deslauriers, though Deslauriers did not receive any playing time. On November 1, 2010, Deslauriers was placed on waivers, leaving Devan Dubnyk as the primary backup for the Oilers. Deslauriers was assigned to the Oklahoma City Barons, where he was the number two goalie behind Gerber.

Deslauriers played for Team Canada at the 2010 Spengler Cup, where he was named top goaltender.

=== Anaheim Ducks (2011–12), AHL return, European career ===
On July 12, 2011, Deslauriers signed a two-year contract with the Anaheim Ducks. On January 10, 2012, he earned his first win as a Duck, a 5–2 win over the Dallas Stars.

After playing the entirety of the 2013–14 season in the AHL with the Wilkes-Barre/Scranton Penguins, Deslauriers as a free agent agreed to attend the Los Angeles Kings 2014 training camp on a try-out contract on September 2, 2014. He was released from his tryout by the Kings on September 26, 2014.

After one season in the Kontinental Hockey League with Latvian club Dinamo Riga, Deslauriers continued his career abroad by signing a one-year contract with German club Augsburger Panther of the DEL on June 19, 2015.

Upon his retirement, Deslauriers resided in Edmonton and worked in commercial real estate.

== Career statistics ==
| | | | Regular season | | | | | | | | | Playoffs |
| Season | Team | League | GP | W | L | T/OT | MIN | GA | SO | GAA | SV% | GP | W | L | MIN | GA | SO | GAA | SV% |
|---|---|---|---|---|---|---|---|---|---|---|---|---|---|---|---|---|---|---|---|
| 2001–02 | Chicoutimi Saguenéens | QMJHL | 51 | 28 | 20 | 1 | 2909 | 170 | 1 | 3.51 | .900 | 4 | 0 | 3 | 197 | 20 | 0 | 6.09 | .844 |
| 2002–03 | Chicoutimi Saguenéens | QMJHL | 54 | 18 | 24 | 1 | 2582 | 164 | 0 | 3.81 | .888 | 4 | 0 | 4 | 240 | 15 | 0 | 3.76 | .904 |
| 2003–04 | Chicoutimi Saguenéens | QMJHL | 50 | 21 | 20 | 6 | 2701 | 129 | 1 | 2.87 | .916 | 18 | 10 | 8 | 956 | 50 | 1 | 3.14 | .907 |
| 2004–05 | Edmonton Roadrunners | AHL | 22 | 6 | 13 | 2 | 1258 | 62 | 0 | 2.96 | .888 | — | — | — | — | — | — | — | — |
| 2004–05 | Greenville Grrrowl | ECHL | 11 | 7 | 3 | 1 | 673 | 1 | 26 | 2.32 | .940 | — | — | — | — | — | — | — | — |
| 2005–06 | Hamilton Bulldogs | AHL | 13 | 4 | 7 | 0 | 666 | 35 | 0 | 3.15 | .897 | — | — | — | — | — | — | — | — |
| 2005–06 | Greenville Grrrowl | ECHL | 6 | 2 | 4 | 0 | 335 | 17 | 0 | 3.05 | .899 | — | — | — | — | — | — | — | — |
| 2006–07 | Wilkes-Barre/Scranton Penguins | AHL | 40 | 22 | 12 | 3 | 2231 | 92 | 4 | 2.47 | .908 | — | — | — | — | — | — | — | — |
| 2007–08 | Springfield Falcons | AHL | 57 | 26 | 23 | 5 | 3045 | 147 | 0 | 2.90 | .912 | — | — | — | — | — | — | — | — |
| 2008–09 | Edmonton Oilers | NHL | 10 | 4 | 3 | 0 | 540 | 30 | 0 | 3.34 | .901 | — | — | — | — | — | — | — | — |
| 2008–09 | Springfield Falcons | AHL | 5 | 1 | 4 | 0 | 286 | 13 | 0 | 2.73 | .906 | — | — | — | — | — | — | — | — |
| 2009–10 | Edmonton Oilers | NHL | 48 | 16 | 28 | 4 | 2798 | 152 | 3 | 3.26 | .901 | — | — | — | — | — | — | — | — |
| 2010–11 | Oklahoma City Barons | AHL | 35 | 17 | 13 | 4 | 1945 | 91 | 3 | 2.81 | .906 | 1 | 0 | 1 | 20 | 3 | 0 | 9.00 | .500 |
| 2011–12 | Syracuse Crunch | AHL | 16 | 6 | 9 | 0 | 864 | 54 | 0 | 3.75 | .881 | — | — | — | — | — | — | — | — |
| 2011–12 | Anaheim Ducks | NHL | 4 | 3 | 1 | 0 | 241 | 11 | 0 | 2.74 | .902 | — | — | — | — | — | — | — | — |
| 2012–13 | Norfolk Admirals | AHL | 2 | 1 | 1 | 0 | 120 | 7 | 0 | 3.51 | .889 | — | — | — | — | — | — | — | — |
| 2012–13 | Fort Wayne Komets | ECHL | 15 | 6 | 8 | 1 | 867 | 47 | 0 | 3.25 | .902 | — | — | — | — | — | — | — | — |
| 2012–13 | Houston Aeros | AHL | 3 | 1 | 1 | 0 | 103 | 2 | 1 | 1.17 | .967 | — | — | — | — | — | — | — | — |
| 2013–14 | Wilkes-Barre/Scranton Penguins | AHL | 40 | 20 | 15 | 3 | 2140 | 92 | 1 | 2.58 | .895 | — | — | — | — | — | — | — | — |
| 2014–15 | Dinamo Riga | KHL | 13 | 4 | 8 | 1 | 743 | 33 | 1 | 2.66 | .903 | — | — | — | — | — | — | — | — |
| 2015–16 | Augsburger Panther | DEL | 35 | 14 | 18 | 0 | 1836 | 105 | 0 | 3.43 | .888 | — | — | — | — | — | — | — | — |
| 2016–17 | Lacombe Generals | ChHL | 3 | — | — | — | — | — | — | 2.98 | .917 | — | — | — | — | — | — | — | — |
| NHL totals | | | 62 | 23 | 32 | 4 | 3578 | 193 | 3 | 3.24 | .901 | — | — | — | — | — | — | — | — |
