= Jean-Michel Daoust =

Canadian ice hockey player

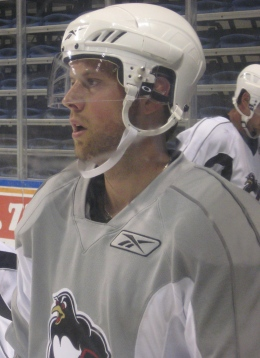
- Born: November 24, 1983 (age 42) Salaberry-de-Valleyfield, Quebec, Canada
- Height: 5 ft 7 in (170 cm)
- Weight: 160 lb (73 kg; 11 st 6 lb)
- Position: Right wing
- Shoots: Right
- DEL2 team Former teams: Kassel Huskies; Rockford IceHogs; Wilkes-Barre/Scranton Penguins; Houston Aeros; Straubing Tigers; Graz 99ers Stavanger Oilers
- NHL draft: Undrafted
- Playing career: 2006–present

Jean-Michel Daoust (born November 24, 1983) is a Canadian professional ice hockey player. He played for several teams in the American Hockey League and in Europe before returning to Quebec to play for teams in the Ligue Nord-Américaine de Hockey.

== Playing career ==
Undrafted from the Quebec Major Junior Hockey League, Daoust first played professionally for the Danbury Trashers of the UHL in 2005.

On January 18, 2008, Daoust signed a professional tryout contract with the Wilkes-Barre/Scranton Penguins. At the time, he ranked 1st in the ECHL in points (51) before signing with Wilkes-Barre/Scranton. He would finish the season with 18 points in 37 games.

On July 18, 2008, the Penguins exercised their option to re-sign Daoust. Daoust then moved to the Houston Aeros for the 2009–10 season, before signing a one-year contract with NHL affiliate, the Minnesota Wild, to remain in Houston the following year.

On June 9, 2011, Daoust signed with European DEL team, the Straubing Tigers on a one-year deal.

== Career statistics ==
			Regular season					Playoffs
Season	Team	League	GP	G	A	Pts	PIM	GP	G	A	Pts	PIM
2000–01	Hull Olympiques	QMJHL	68	23	27	50	84	5	0	0	0	8
2001–02	Hull Olympiques	QMJHL	72	16	20	36	91	10	2	1	3	11
2002–03	Hull Olympiques	QMJHL	72	34	60	94	104	20	12	25	37	28
2003–04	Gatineau Olympiques	QMJHL	60	31	65	96	82	15	7	15	22	16
2004–05	McGill University	OUAA	13	8	5	13	37	—	—	—	—	—
2004–05	Sherbrooke St. Francois	LNAH	24	8	15	23	14	—	—	—	—	—
2005–06	Danbury Trashers	UHL	70	30	35	65	73	18	7	4	11	8
2006–07	Cincinnati Cyclones	ECHL	71	32	30	62	63	10	3	5	8	8
2007–08	Cincinnati Cyclones	ECHL	36	27	24	51	54	17	6	12	18	14
2007–08	Rockford IceHogs	AHL	1	0	0	0	0	—	—	—	—	—
2007–08	Wilkes-Barre/Scranton Penguins	AHL	37	5	13	18	4	2	0	0	0	0
2008–09	Wilkes-Barre/Scranton Penguins	AHL	58	10	18	28	24	12	5	4	9	12
2009–10	Houston Aeros	AHL	78	21	34	55	38	—	—	—	—	—
2010–11	Houston Aeros	AHL	72	12	18	30	39	11	4	1	5	2
2011–12	Straubing Tigers	DEL	45	5	12	17	52	—	—	—	—	—
2012–13	Graz 99ers	EBEL	45	16	22	38	65	5	1	0	1	5
2013–14	Stavanger Oilers	GET	44	19	38	57	42	17	5	13	18	10
2014–15	Stavanger Oilers	GET	37	11	27	38	61	15	4	6	10	14
2015–16	Kassel Huskies	DEL2	45	17	25	42	62	13	6	10	16	49
AHL totals			246	48	83	131	105	25	9	5	14	14

== Awards ==
Year	Award	Team
2008	Kelly Cup (ECHL)	Cincinnati Cyclones
2007	ECHL Player Of The Month (December)	Cincinnati Cyclones
2004	Memorial Cup (QMJHL)	Gatineau Olympiques
2003	Memorial Cup (QMJHL)	Hull Olympiques
