= Francis Lemieux =

Canadian ice hockey player

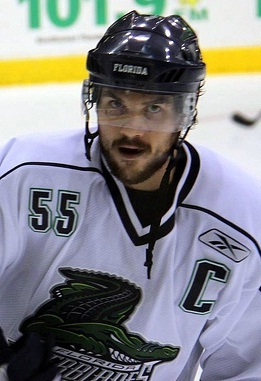
- Lemieux with the Florida Everblades in 2010
- Born: February 22, 1984 (age 41) Sherbrooke, Quebec, Canada
- Height: 5 ft 11 in (180 cm)
- Weight: 185 lb (84 kg; 13 st 3 lb)
- Position: Centre
- Shot: Right
- Played for: Hamilton Bulldogs; Grand Rapids Griffins; Vienna Capitals; Manitoba Moose; Connecticut Whale; Heilbronner Falken; HC TWK Innsbruck; Graz 99ers; HC Ajoie; IF Frisk Asker
- Playing career: 2005–2016

Francis Lemieux (born February 22, 1984) is a Canadian former professional ice hockey centre. Lemieux has played 249 regular-season games in the American Hockey League for the Hamilton Bulldogs and Grand Rapids Griffins. He has also played in Europe with several teams.

Lemieux was born in Sherbrooke, Quebec, Canada. He played his junior ice hockey with the Chicoutimi Sagueneens from 2001 through 2005. Not drafted by the NHL, Lemieux pursued a professional career with the Hamilton Bulldogs, then the top farm team of the Montreal Canadiens. Lemieux played two and a half seasons before being traded to the Detroit Red Wings in February 2008, joining their top farm team, the Grand Rapids Griffins.

Lemieux played for several teams in the American Hockey League, the ECHL and European leagues before finishing his career in Norway in 2015–16.
