= Marek Haščák =

Slovak ice hockey player

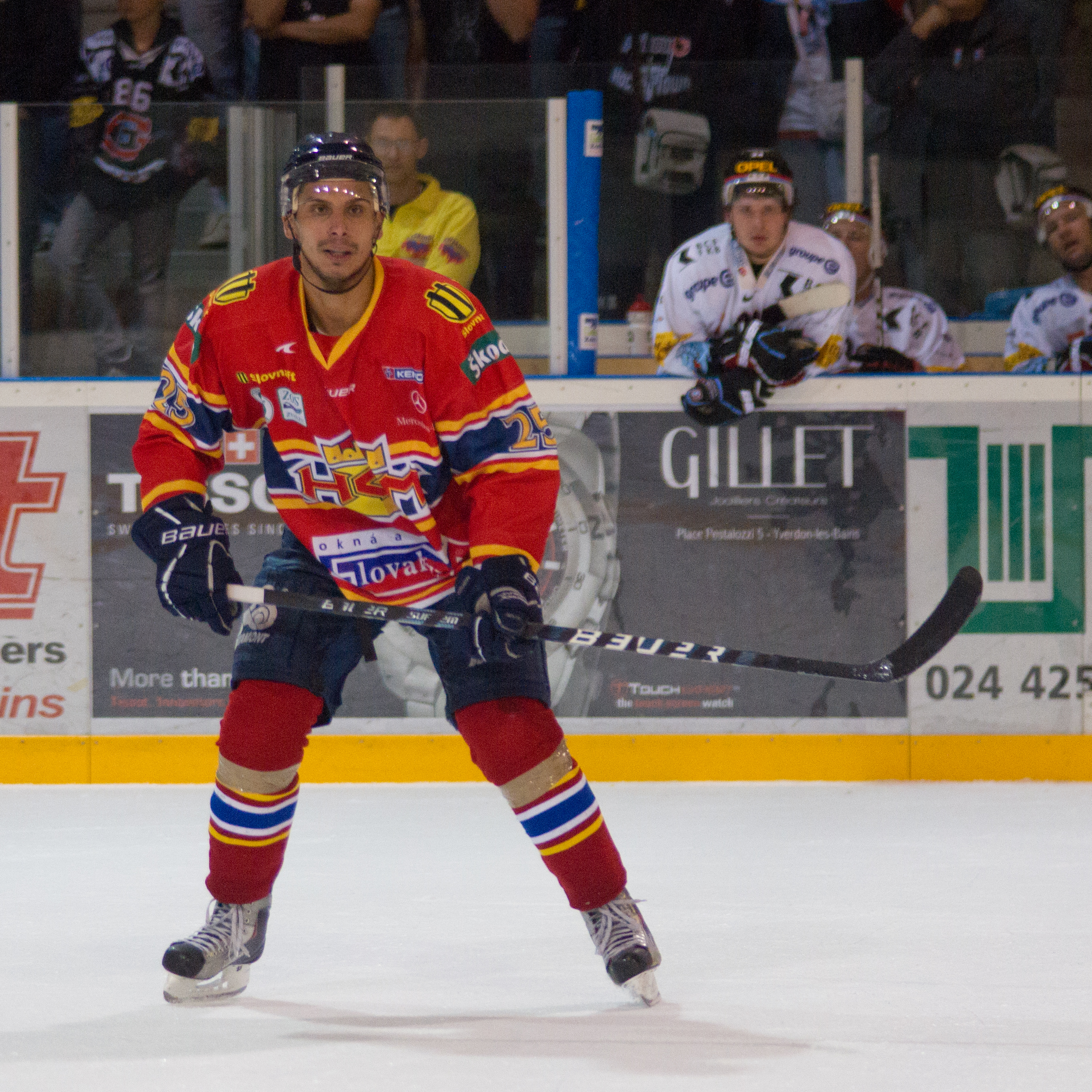
- Born: 8 December 1985 (age 40) Trenčín, Czechoslovakia
- Height: 6 ft 3 in (191 cm)
- Weight: 194 lb (88 kg; 13 st 12 lb)
- Position: Centre
- Shot: Left
- Played for: HC Dukla Trenčín; HK Riga 2000; HC Karlovy Vary; HKm Zvolen; HK Nitra; MHk 32 Liptovský Mikuláš
- NHL draft: Undrafted
- Playing career: 2004–2014

Marek Haščák (born 8 December 1985) is a Slovak former professional ice hockey centre.

Prior to the 2011-12 season, he had been under a try-out contract with the Malmö Redhawks of the HockeyAllsvenskan, however that try-out contract expired at the end of August 2011.

== Career statistics ==
			Regular season					Playoffs
Season	Team	League	GP	G	A	Pts	PIM	GP	G	A	Pts	PIM
2002–03	Shawinigan Cataractes	QMJHL	53	1	9	10	21	9	1	1	2	0
2003–04	Shawinigan Cataractes	QMJHL	61	16	14	30	28	10	1	0	1	8
2004–05	HK Dukla Trencin U20	Slovak U20	29	15	10	25	48	2	0	0	0	25
2004–05	HK Dukla Trencin	Slovak	7	0	0	0	0	—	—	—	—	—
2004–05	ŠHK 37 Piešťany	Slovak2	2	0	0	0	0	—	—	—	—	—
2005–06	HK Riga 2000	Belarus	50	8	9	17	18	6	3	2	5	6
2005–06	HK Riga 2000	Latvia	—	5	2	7	2	—	—	—	—	—
2006–07	HK Dukla Trencin	Slovak	21	4	1	5	39	—	—	—	—	—
2006–07	HK 95 Povazska Bystrica	Slovak2	3	0	0	0	6	—	—	—	—	—
2007–08	HK Dukla Trencin	Slovak	54	9	15	24	18	14	1	1	2	8
2008–09	HK Dukla Trencin	Slovak	51	7	15	22	34	4	0	1	1	0
2009–10	HC Energie Karlovy Vary	Czech	12	0	2	2	4	—	—	—	—	—
2009–10	HKM Zvolen	Slovak	31	6	8	14	8	5	4	0	4	2
2010–11	HKM Zvolen	Slovak	40	10	12	22	12	—	—	—	—	—
2011–12	HK Nitra	Slovak	9	1	0	1	4	—	—	—	—	—
2013–14	HK 32 Liptovsky Mikulas	Slovak2	6	1	0	1	0	—	—	—	—	—
Slovak totals			213	37	51	88	115	23	5	2	7	10
