= James Sanford (ice hockey) =

Canadian ice hockey player

- Born: June 18, 1984 (age 41) Timmins, Ontario, Canada
- Height: 5 ft 10 in (178 cm)
- Weight: 201 lb (91 kg; 14 st 5 lb)
- Position: Defence
- Shot: Left
- Played for: AHL; Hamilton Bulldogs; Milwaukee Admirals; Chicago Wolves; ECHL; Peoria Rivermen; Long Beach Ice Dogs; Texas Wildcatters; Utah Grizzlies; CHL; Odessa Jackalopes; Dayton Gems
- NHL draft: Undrafted
- Playing career: 2004–2016

James Sanford (born June 18, 1984) is a Canadian former professional ice hockey defenceman.

== Career ==
On August 25, 2011, the Dayton Gems of the Central Hockey League signed Sanford as a free agent for the 2011–12 season. On December 10, 2011, Sanford was signed by the Trenton Titans of the ECHL.
