= Aréna Jacques Plante =

Multi-purpose arena in Shawinigan, Quebec

Coordinates: 46°32′36″N 72°44′42″W

Aréna Jacques-Plante
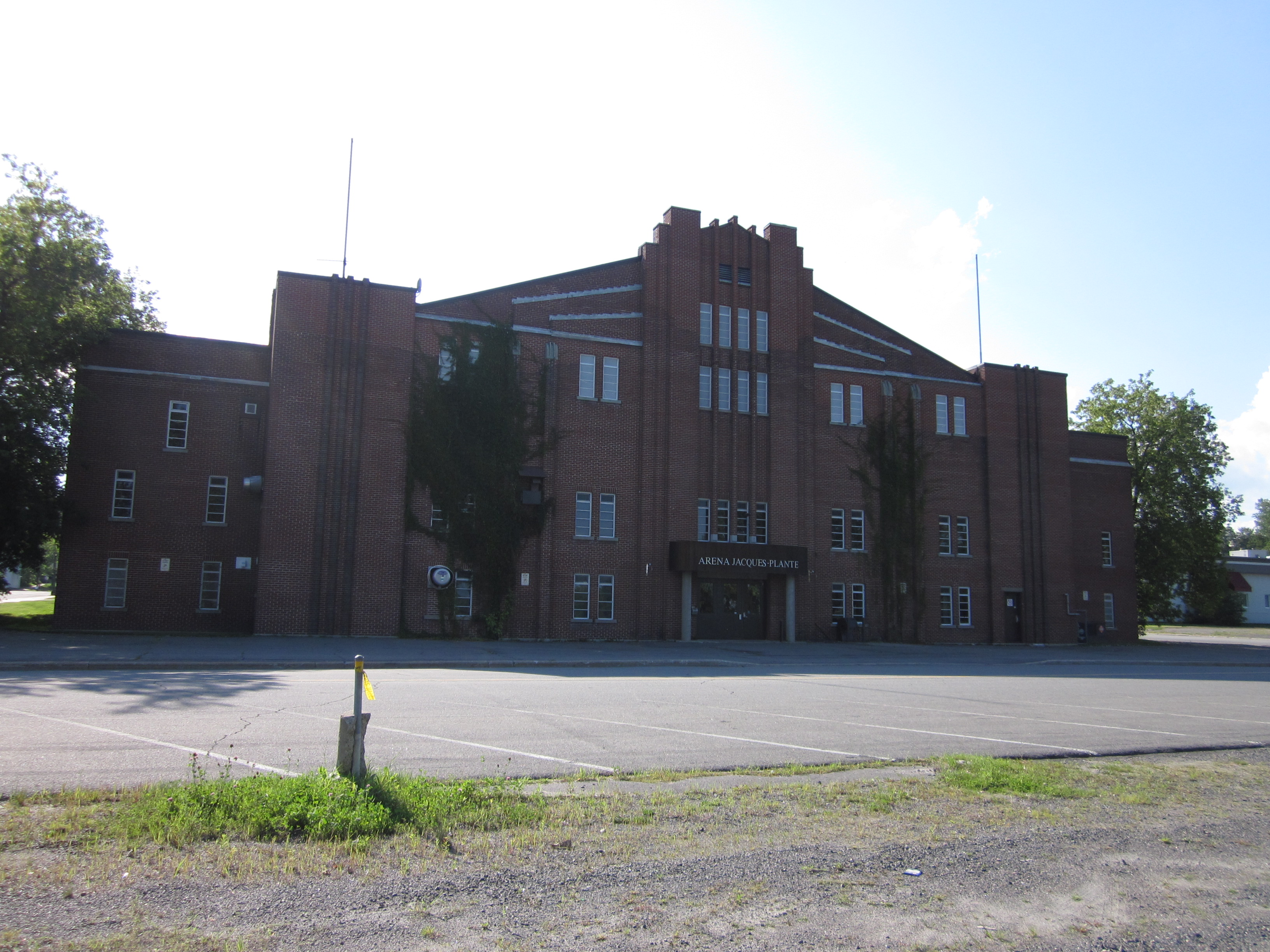
- Interactive map of Aréna Jacques-Plante
- Address: 55, rue Broadway
- Location: Shawinigan, Quebec, Canada
- Capacity: 3,700

Construction
- Opened: 1937

Tenant
- Shawinigan Cataractes (1969–2008)

The Arena Jacques Plante was a 2,524-seat (total capacity 3,700) multi-purpose arena in Shawinigan, Quebec, Canada. It was built in 1937. It was home to the Shawinigan Cataractes Ice hockey team. The arena is named in honour of Jacques Plante; formerly, the building was known as the Shawinigan Municipal Auditorium. In 2008, the building was closed in favour of the new Centre Bionest located adjacent to the Arena Jacques Plante.
