= Maxime Boisclair =

Haitian-Canadian ice hockey player

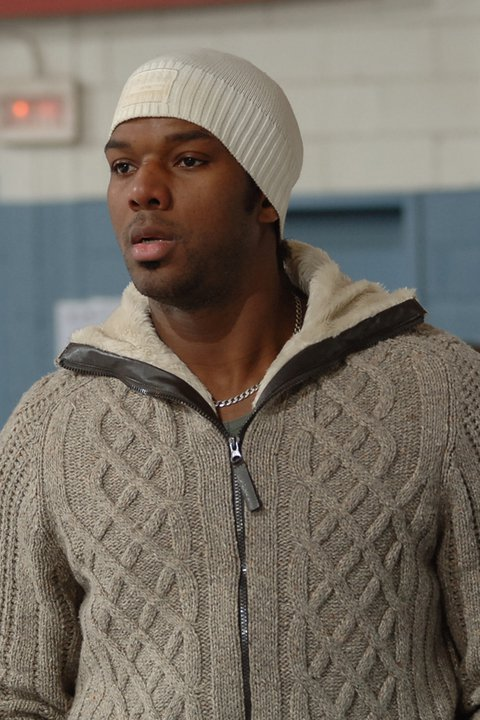
- Boisclair in 2011
- Born: February 14, 1985 (age 40); Port-au-Prince, Haiti
- Height: 6 ft 0 in (183 cm)
- Weight: 196 lb (89 kg; 14 st 0 lb)
- Position: Right Wing
- Shot: Left
- Played for: AHL; Springfield Falcons; Syracuse Crunch; Hershey Bears; ECHL; Johnstown Chiefs; Elmira Jackals; Charlotte Checkers; Ontario Reign; Stockton Thunder; CHL; Corpus Christi IceRays; FRA; Dauphins d'Épinal; KAZ; Arlan Kokshetau
- NHL draft: Undrafted
- Playing career: 2006–2017

Maxime Boisclair (born February 14, 1985) is a Haitian Canadian former professional ice hockey forward. He most recently played as a member of Trois-Rivières Blizzard of the Ligue Nord-Américaine de Hockey (LNAH).

== Playing career ==
=== Juniors ===
Boisclair was drafted in the first round (9th overall) in the 2001 Quebec Major Junior Hockey League (QMJHL) draft by the Sherbrooke Castors. On December 27, 2002, Boisclair, Yan Gaudette, and Sherbrooke's 2nd round pick in 2003 were traded to the Chicoutimi Saguenéens for Pierre-Alexandre Parenteau and Chicoutimi's 4th round pick choice of 2004.

Boisclair earned the title of QMJHL Offensive Player of the Month in December 2004, scoring six goals and twelve assists in ten games. A week after being named QMJHL Offensive Player of the Month, Boisclair was named QMJHL Offensive Player of the Week. From the period stretching from Monday, December 27, 2004, to Sunday, January 9, 2005, Boisclair scored ten goals and fourteen points in only seven games. Boisclair would finish the season with 51 goals in 70 games. In Boisclair's final season with the Saguenéens, he scored 70 goals in 70 games. Despite leading the QMJHL in goals, Boisclair would go undrafted. Scouts and Boisclair himself have pointed to his lack of foot speed as a factor. Boisclair was the first Black player in QMJHL history to lead the league in goals scored.

=== Professional ===
Since turning professional, Boisclair has split his time primarily between the ECHL and the Quebec-based LNAH.

As a member of the 2006-07 Johnstown Chiefs, Boisclair led the team in scoring with 51 points in 59 games. During this season, he also earned himself a trip to the ECHL All-Star Game as a member of the American Conference along with a recall by the Chiefs' American Hockey League affiliate, the Springfield Falcons, where Boisclair also played 17 games but only scored one goal. While with the Chiefs, Boisclair skated on the Chiefs' top line with former Saguenéens teammate Stanislav Lascek.

Boisclair joined the Saint-Hyacinthe Top Design for the 2007-08 LNAH season. Boisclair's left the team as the league's highest scorer, scoring 82 points in 47 games, and signed with the ECHL's Elmira Jackals

In the 2012-13 season, Boisclair played in the Kazakhstan Hockey Championship with Arlan Kokshetau. In 35 games, he scored 19 goals and contributed 30 assists. He finished the season returning to the ECHL, where he linked up with the Stockton Thunder, immediately establishing himself amongst the Thunders top point producers.

== Awards and honors ==
- 2004: QMJHL Offensive Player Of The Month (December)
- 2005-06: QMJHL, Most goals (70)
- 2005-06: CHL, Named to Second All-Star Team
- 2006-07: Selected to ECHL All-Star Game (American Conference)
- 2012: Kazakhstan Hockey Cup
