= Jean Bégin =

Canadian ice hockey coach

- Born: 1944; Quebec, Canada
- Died: November 20, 1991 (aged 47); Stoneham, Quebec, Canada
- Occupation: Ice hockey coach
- Years active: 1982 to 1989
- Known for: Quebec Major Junior Hockey League head coach, Canada men's national junior ice hockey team assistant coach
- Criminal charges: Child sexual abuse
- Criminal penalty: Six months in prison
- Awards: President's Cup (1984, 1985)

Jean Bégin (1944 – November 20, 1991) was a Canadian ice hockey coach and convicted sex offender. He worked six seasons in the Quebec Major Junior Hockey League (QMJHL), and one season in the Nationale 1A league in France. He was the first coach in the QMJHL to make three appearances at the Memorial Cup tournament. He won two President's Cups coaching the Laval Voisins and the Verdun Junior Canadiens to QMJHL championships. He later served as an assistant coach on the Canada men's national junior ice hockey team. Bégin was convicted on seven counts of sexual contact with boys in 1989, and served six months in prison. He committed suicide after his release from jail at age 47.

== Early life ==
Bégin was born in 1944 in Quebec. (Note: Bégin's year of birth can be deduced by process of elimination based on his age as of the following dates: He was 37 years old as of July 27, 1982 (born 1944 or 1945). He was 44 years old as of February 10, 1989 (born 1944 or 1945). He was 45 years old as of May 26, 1990 (born 1944 or 1945). He was 47 years old as of November 20, 1991 (born 1943 or 1944).) He played minor ice hockey for the Quebec Junior Aces during the 1964–65 season.

== Coaching career ==
Bégin coached hockey in the Quebec City region from 1967 to 1982. After he led a team from Sainte-Foy to a junior-B championship during the 1981–82 season, he was considered for the Shawinigan Cataractes coaching position.

=== Hull Olympiques ===
Bégin started his career in the Quebec Major Junior Hockey League (QMJHL) as the head coach and general manager of the Hull Olympiques during the 1982–83 QMJHL season. He was named coach on July 27, 1982, at age 37. He led the team to 30 wins in 70 games, and a fifth-place finish in the Lebel Division. Future National Hockey League (NHL) players on the team were Joel Baillargeon, Yves Beaudoin, Alain Raymond, Serge Roberge and Sylvain Turgeon. In the playoffs, Hull faced the Laval Voisins who won 53 games and placed first in the division. Bégin's team extended the series to its maximum seven games, but lost the series by three games to four.

=== Laval Voisins ===
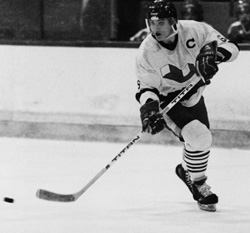
Mario Lemieux playing for the Laval Voisins during the 1983–84 QMJHL season.

Bégin served as head coach of the Laval Voisins for the 1983–84 QMJHL season. His team included future NHL players Mario Lemieux, Vincent Damphousse, Bobby Dollas, Steve Finn, Yves Courteau, and Michel Mongeau. Bégin made the decision during the pre-season to put Lemieux on a forward line with Jacques Goyette, after Lemieux asked to play with him. The move was successful, as Lemieux won the QMJHL scoring title with 133 goals and 282 points in 70 games.

Laval won 54 games during the regular season, and compiled the best record in league by 14 wins more than the next best team. In the playoffs, the Voisins defeated both the Drummondville Voltigeurs and Granby Bisons in four consecutive games, then defeated the Longueuil Chevaliers in six games in the league finals. Lemieux scored 52 points in the playoffs, including 29 goals. The victory was the first President's Cup for Bégin, and earned the team a berth at the 1984 Memorial Cup for the national championship.

Bégin and the Voisins travelled to the 1984 Memorial Cup tournament hosted in Kitchener, Ontario. The presence of Lemieux was highly anticipated. Before the tournament, Bégin was quoted as saying, "It will be the 66th Memorial Cup and I hope our #66 [Lemieux] will continue his output of the regular season and playoffs". The Voisins lost 8–2 versus the Kitchener Rangers, then lost 6–5 versus the Ottawa 67's, and lost 4–3 versus the Kamloops Junior Oilers, leaving Bégin winless in coaching at his first Memorial Cup. The QMJHL recognized Bégin by naming him coach of the second all-star team for the season.

Bégin returned as head coach for the 1984–85 QMJHL season. After 19 games, his team had a record of 7 wins and 12 losses. Laval struggled without Lemieux who was now on the Pittsburgh Penguins in the NHL, and the Voisins were drawing an average crowd of only 750 fans per game. Team owner Claude Fournel fired Bégin, and commented on the season by saying "this is like a cold shower". Bégin was replaced by Marcel Patenaude as coach.

=== Verdun Junior Canadiens ===
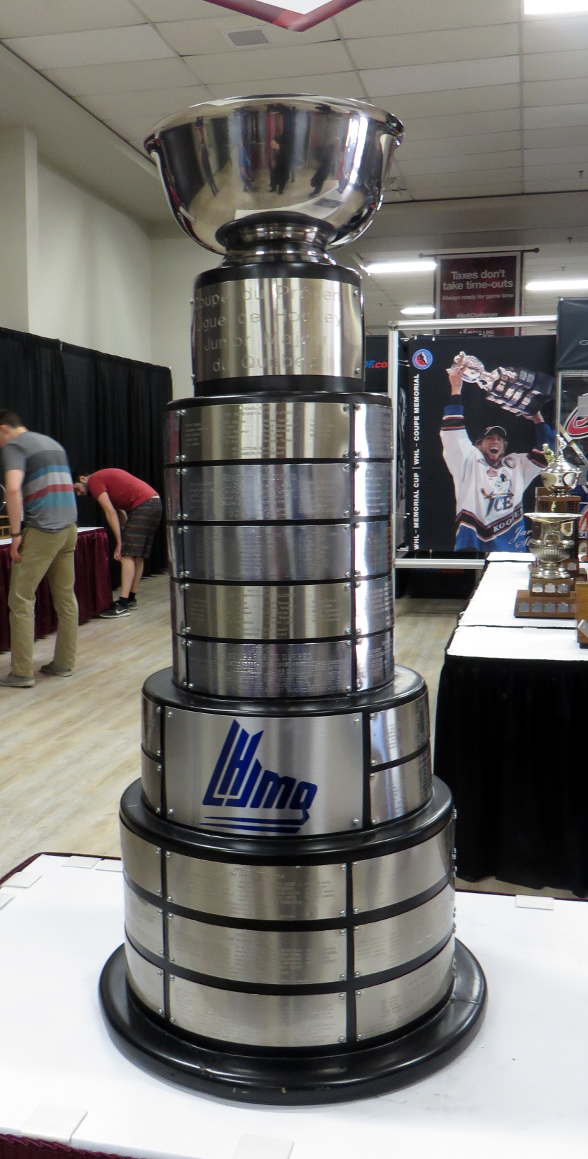
The President's Cup trophy

Bégin was named head coach of the Verdun Junior Canadiens for the final five games of the 1984–85 QMJHL season and the playoffs. He took over for Yvon Lambert who resigned on March 8, 1985, because he said "it was too difficult for him to motivate amateur-level players". The team included future NHL players Claude Lemieux, Jimmy Carson, Gerry Fleming, Shane MacEachern, and Everett Sanipass.

Bégin led Verdun to three wins in the remainder of the regular season, and a first-place finish in the Lebel Division. In the playoffs, Verdun defeated the Hull Olympiques four games to one in the first round, then defeated the Shawinigan Cataractes four games to one in the second round, and defeated the Chicoutimi Saguenéens in four consecutive games to win the President's Cup. Claude Lemieux led the league in playoffs scoring 23 goals, and 40 points. Verdun's games in the 1985 Memorial Cup were played in Drummondville, Quebec. Verdun lost 6–3 to the Sault Ste. Marie Greyhounds in game one, lost 5–3 to the Prince Albert Raiders in game two, and lost 5–1 to the Shawinigan Cataractes in game three. Bégin finished the tournament with losses in all six games coached at the 1984 and 1985 Memorial Cups.

=== Trois-Rivières Draveurs ===
Bégin was named head coach of the Trois-Rivières Draveurs for the 1985–86 QMJHL season. He led the team to 36 wins, and a second-place finish in the Dilio division. The team's top scorer was Martin Desjardins with 118 points. The Draveurs had three future NHL players, including Claude Lapointe, Donald Dufresne, and Frank Breault. In the first round of the playoffs, the Draveurs were defeated in five consecutive games by the Laval Titan.

=== HC Amiens Somme ===
Bégin relocated to France and became head coach of HC Amiens Somme for the 1986–87 Nationale 1A season. His team placed fourth overall in the league, and included Michel Galarneau who finished tenth in league scoring and François Dusseau who won the Jean-Pierre Graff Trophy as the league's rookie-of-the-year.

=== Drummondville Voltigeurs ===
Bégin was named head coach and general manager of the Drummondville Voltigeurs for the 1987–88 QMJHL season. He earned the nickname "Johnny B. Good" from his players. His team included future NHL players Frédéric Chabot, Rob Murphy, Claude Boivin, Daniel Doré, and Mario Doyon.

The Memorial Cup trophy

On November 6, 1987, he was announced as an assistant coach to Dave Chambers on the Canada men's national junior ice hockey team, to replace Clément Jodoin who joined the Pittsburgh Penguins. The Canadian juniors travelled to Moscow for the 1988 World Junior Ice Hockey Championships, and won the gold medal with a record of six wins and a draw. Canadian author Gare Joyce described Bégin as the easy-going part of the "good cop/bad cop" duo of the team's assistant coaches, compared to Ken Hitchcock.

The Voltigeurs completed the regular season with 35 wins in 70 games, and placed second in the Dilio Division. In the playoffs, Bégin's team defeated the Victoriaville Tigres four games to one in the first round, defeated the Shawinigan Cataractes four games to one in the second round, then faced the Hull Olympiques in the finals. Bégin was one win away from his third President's Cup title as Drummondville held a three games to one lead in the series, but lost the final three games of series to Hull.

The 1988 Memorial Cup was hosted by the QMJHL in Chicoutimi. The league chose to send its two league finalists to the tournament, instead of a host team. Bégin became the first coach in the QMJHL's history to make three appearances at the Memorial Cup tournament. During the tournament, he was given an interview by Hockey Canada for the national junior team head coach position at the upcoming 1989 World Championships. Drummondville team lost the first game by a 8–3 score to the Windsor Spitfires, and lost the second game by a 7–1 score to the Medicine Hat Tigers. Bégin's record now stood at eight losses in eight Memorial Cup games. He questioned the intensity of Quebec teams in the tournament, and said that it was easy to win in the QMJHL without playing with intensity. He went on to say, "I prefer to be 0-8 than all the coaches who are 0-0 right now. I could be 0-20 and I'd be happy". Bégin's team lost the third game by a 5–2 score to the Hull Olympiques, and he became winless in all nine Memorial Cup games coached.

Bégin returned as coach and general manager for the 1988–89 QMJHL season. He added future NHL player Denis Chassé to the team for the season. The team achieved 23 wins in the first 52 games of the season. On February 9, 1989, Bégin was suspended indefinitely as coach and general manager of the Drummondville Voltigeurs, after he was arrested on accusations of sexual assault. He was replaced by his assistant coach Gervais Rioux.

=== Coaching record ===
Bégin's career QMJHL coaching record, and his Nationale 1A season.

Season	Team	League	Games	Won	Lost	Tied	Points	Win %	Division standing	Playoffs
1982–83	Hull Olympiques	QMJHL	68	29	39	0	58	0.426	5th in Lebel	Lost in round 1
1983–84	Laval Voisins	QMJHL	66	51	15	0	102	0.773	1st in Lebel	Won President's Cup; 4th place, 1984 Memorial Cup
1984–85	Laval Voisins	QMJHL	19	7	12	0	14	0.368	(4th in Lebel)	Fired midseason
1984–85	Verdun Junior Canadiens	QMJHL	5	3	2	0	6	0.600	1st in Lebel	Won President's Cup; 4th place, 1985 Memorial Cup
1985–86	Trois-Rivières Draveurs	QMJHL	45	26	19	0	52	0.578	2nd in Dilio	Lost in round 1
1986–87	HC Amiens Somme	Nationale 1A	36	19	13	4	42	0.583	4th overall in league	
1987–88	Drummondville Voltigeurs	QMJHL	62	32	26	4	68	0.548	2nd in Dilio	Lost in President's Cup finals 4th place, 1988 Memorial Cup
1988–89	Drummondville Voltigeurs	QMJHL	52	23	25	4	50	0.481	(5th in QMJHL)	Suspended indefinitely
Totals			317	171	138	8	350	0.552	2 division titles	2 President's Cups 3 Memorial Cup appearances

== Sexual abuse incidents ==
An unnamed player from the Drummondville Voltigeurs had contacted agent Gilles Lupien regarding Bégin's conduct. Lupien stated the player's initial complaints were, "the coach always wants a private meeting with me after every practice, and he talks about all kinds of things, but never hockey". Later complaints mentioned that Bégin insisting on taking showers together, and the player stating that "he touched my ass in the shower". Two hockey players complained to the police in 1989, regarding inappropriate sexual behavior by Bégin.

Bégin was arrested at his home in Drummondville on February 8, 1989, and charged with sexual assault against an 11-year-old boy. He was married with three children at the time of his arrest, and released a day later on C$1,000 bail. The charge was dropped in June 1989. He was later arrested and charged with seven counts of sexual assault involving two boys, neither of whom played on his team. At the sentencing hearing, Bégin wept as he told the court that he had been sexually abused as a youth and considered himself to be deeply scarred. He pleaded guilty to seven charges of sexual contact with boys in incidents between November 1988, and January 1989. In 1991, he was convicted on all seven counts of sexual assault, and served six months in prison. He was also banned from sporting activities including minors and to seek professional counselling.

== Later life and death ==
Bégin was released from prison in 1991. On November 20, 1991, his burned corpse was found by police in a car near Stoneham, Quebec. The car had a pipe which redirected carbon monoxide exhaust to the inside which had then burst into flames. His death was reported as a suicide. He was 47 years old.

== See also ==
- Graham James, Canadian junior ice hockey coach convicted of sexual assault

== Bibliography ==
- Lapp, Richard M.; Macaulay, Alec (1997). The Memorial Cup: Canada's National Junior Hockey Championship. Madeira Park, British Columbia: Harbour Publishing. ISBN 1-55017-170-4.
- Joyce, Gare (2011), Thirty Years of the Game at Its Best, Toronto, Ontario: Viking Press, ISBN 978-0-670-06594-3
