= 1990–91 NHL transactions =

This list is for 1990–91 NHL transactions within professional ice hockey league of players in North America. The following contains team-to-team transactions that occurred in the National Hockey League during the 1990–91 NHL season. It lists what team each player has been traded to, or claimed by, and for which players or draft picks, if applicable.

== June ==
June 1, 1990	To St. Louis Blues Rob Whistle	To Washington Capitals 8th-rd pick – 1990 entry draft (# 159 – Steve Martell)
June 15, 1990	To Montreal Canadiens 5th-rd pick – 1991 entry draft (# 100 – Brad Layzell)	To Detroit Red Wings Rick Green
June 15, 1990	To Calgary Flames 2nd-rd pick – 1990 entry draft (# 24 – David Harlock)	To Detroit Red Wings Brad McCrimmon
June 16, 1990	To Buffalo Sabres Dale Hawerchuk; 1st-rd pick – 1990 entry draft (# 14 – Brad May)	To Winnipeg Jets Scott Arniel; Phil Housley; Jeff Parker; 1st-rd pick – 1990 entry draft (# 19 – Keith Tkachuk)
June 16, 1990	To Calgary Flames 2nd-rd pick – 1990 entry draft (# 26 – Nicolas Perreault)	To Pittsburgh Penguins Joe Mullen
June 16, 1990	To Toronto Maple Leafs Kevin Maguire; 8th-rd pick – 1991 entry draft (# 160 – Dmitri Mironov)	To Philadelphia Flyers 3rd-rd pick – 1990 entry draft (# 52 – Al Kinisky)
June 16, 1990	To New Jersey Devils 1st-rd pick – 1990 entry draft (# 20 – Martin Brodeur); 2nd-rd pick – 1990 entry draft (# 24 – David Harlock); 2nd-rd pick – 1990 entry draft (# 29 – Chris Gotziaman)	To Calgary Flames 1st-rd pick – 1990 entry draft (# 11 – Trevor Kidd); 2nd-rd pick – 1990 entry draft (# 32 – Vesa Viitakoski)
June 22, 1990	To Montreal Canadiens Alain Cote	To Washington Capitals Marc Deschamps
June 26, 1990	To Detroit Red Wings cash	To New York Rangers Sam St. Laurent
June 28, 1990	To Boston Bruins Chris Nilan	To New York Rangers Greg Johnston cash
June 28, 1990	To Toronto Maple Leafs Greg Johnston	To New York Rangers Tie Domi; Mark Laforest
June 29, 1990	To Montreal Canadiens Denis Savard	To Chicago Blackhawks Chris Chelios; 2nd-rd pick – 1991 entry draft (# 39 – Mike Pomichter)

== July ==
July 5, 1990	To Buffalo Sabres John Tucker	To Washington Capitals cash
July 7, 1990	To Hartford Whalers Carey Wilson; 3rd-rd pick – 1991 entry draft (# 59 – Michael Nylander)	To New York Rangers Jody Hull
July 9, 1990	To Buffalo Sabres future considerations cash	To New York Rangers Ray Sheppard
July 9, 1990	To Winnipeg Jets Simon Wheeldon	To New York Rangers Brian McReynolds
July 13, 1990	To St. Louis Blues Geoff Courtnall	To Washington Capitals Mike Lalor; Peter Zezel

== August ==
August 7, 1990	To Montreal Canadiens 4th-rd pick – 1992 entry draft (# 82 – Louis Bernard)	To Minnesota North Stars Bobby Smith
August 15, 1990	To Los Angeles Kings Shawn McCosh	To Detroit Red Wings 8th-rd pick – 1992 entry draft (# 183 – Justin Krall)
August 20, 1990	To Toronto Maple Leafs cash	To Boston Bruins Ken Hammond
August 21, 1990	To Boston Bruins Ken Hodge Jr.	To Minnesota North Stars 4th-rd pick – 1992 entry draft (# 88 – Jere Lehtinen)

== September ==
September 4, 1990	To Montreal Canadiens Gerald Diduck	To New York Islanders Craig Ludwig
September 4, 1990	To New Jersey Devils Claude Lemieux	To Montreal Canadiens Sylvain Turgeon
September 6, 1990	To Minnesota North Stars Craig Duncanson	To Los Angeles Kings Daniel Berthiaume
September 6, 1990	To Minnesota North Stars Brian Hunt	To Winnipeg Jets Craig Duncanson
September 6, 1990	To New Jersey Devils Laurie Boschman	To Winnipeg Jets Bob Brooke^{1}
September 30, 1990	To Buffalo Sabres Bill Houlder	To Washington Capitals Shawn Anderson
September 30, 1990	To Buffalo Sabres Mikko Makela	To Los Angeles Kings Mike Donnelly
September 30, 1990	To Minnesota North Stars Peter Taglianetti	To Winnipeg Jets future considerations

1. Bob Brooke refused to report to Winnipeg and retired from hockey. The trade was changed to New Jersey's fifth-round pick in the 1991 entry draft. Winnipeg selected Yan Kaminsky (# 99 overall) with this pick.

== October ==
October 1, 1990	To Hartford Whalers 6th-rd pick – 1992 entry draft (# 143 – Jarrett Reid)	To Washington Capitals Dave Tippett
October 2, 1990	To St. Louis Blues 11th-rd pick – 1992 entry draft (# 259 – Wade Salzman)	To Pittsburgh Penguins Gordie Roberts
October 3, 1990	To Hartford Whalers cash	To Washington Capitals Joel Quenneville
October 10, 1990	To Montreal Canadiens cash	To Chicago Blackhawks Martin Desjardins
October 11, 1990	To Hartford Whalers Todd Richards	To Montreal Canadiens future considerations
October 22, 1990	To Boston Bruins Vladimir Ruzicka	To Edmonton Oilers Greg Hawgood
October 26, 1990	To Minnesota North Stars Brian Glynn	To Calgary Flames Frantisek Musil
October 30, 1990	To Hartford Whalers Marc Bergevin	To New York Islanders 5th-rd pick – 1992 entry draft (# 105 – Ryan Duthie)

== November ==
November 7, 1990	To Montreal Canadiens Jayson More	To Minnesota North Stars Brian Hayward
November 7, 1990	To Minnesota North Stars Doug Smail	To Winnipeg Jets Don Barber
November 9, 1990	To Toronto Maple Leafs Rob Cimetta	To Boston Bruins Steve Bancroft
November 9, 1990	To Toronto Maple Leafs Mike Krushelnyski	To Los Angeles Kings John McIntyre
November 10, 1990	To Quebec Nordiques 9th-rd pick – 1991 entry draft (# 188 – Brent Brekke)	To Edmonton Oilers Max Middendorf
November 10, 1990	To Toronto Maple Leafs Dave Ellett; Paul Fenton	To Winnipeg Jets Ed Olczyk; Mark Osborne
November 13, 1990	To Hartford Whalers Doug Crossman	To New York Islanders Ray Ferraro
November 17, 1990	To Toronto Maple Leafs Aaron Broten; Lucien DeBlois; Michel Petit	To Quebec Nordiques Scott Pearson; 2nd-rd pick – 1991 entry draft (WAS - # 25 – Eric Lavigne)^{1} 2nd-rd pick – 1992 entry draft (# 29 – Tuomas Gronman)
November 22, 1990	To Minnesota North Stars Bruce Bell	To Edmonton Oilers Kari Takko
November 27, 1990	To New Jersey Devils Lee Norwood; 4th-rd pick – 1992 entry draft (# 94 – Scott McCabe)	To Detroit Red Wings Paul Ysebaert

1. Quebec's second-round pick went to Washington as the result of a trade on June 22, 1991, that sent Mikhail Tatarinov to Quebec in exchange for this pick.

== December ==
December 11, 1990	To Minnesota North Stars Chris Dahlquist; Jim Johnson	To Pittsburgh Penguins Larry Murphy; Peter Taglianetti
December 13, 1990	To Calgary Flames Jim Kyte	To Pittsburgh Penguins Jiri Hrdina
December 14, 1990	To Chicago Blackhawks 4th-rd pick – 1991 entry draft (# 71 – Igor Kravchuk)	To Winnipeg Jets Mike Eagles
December 17, 1990	To Toronto Maple Leafs Mike Foligno; 8th-rd pick – 1991 entry draft (# 167 – Tomas Kucharcik)	To Buffalo Sabres Brian Curran; Lou Franceschetti
December 21, 1990	To Hartford Whalers Rob Brown	To Pittsburgh Penguins Scott Young

== January ==
January 12, 1991	To Toronto Maple Leafs Brian Bradley	To Vancouver Canucks Tom Kurvers
January 12, 1991	To Montreal Canadiens 4th-rd pick – 1991 entry draft (# 73 – Vladimir Vujtek)	To Vancouver Canucks Gerald Diduck
January 16, 1991	To Toronto Maple Leafs Bob Rouse; Peter Zezel	To Washington Capitals Al Iafrate
January 16, 1991	To Boston Bruins Petri Skriko	To Vancouver Canucks 2nd-rd pick – 1992 entry draft (# 40 – Michael Peca)
January 17, 1991	To Quebec Nordiques Aaron Miller; 5th-rd pick – 1991 entry draft (# 103 – Bill Lindsay)	To New York Rangers Joe Cirella
January 21, 1991	To Buffalo Sabres future considerations	To New York Islanders John Tucker
January 22, 1991	To Winnipeg Jets Rudy Poeschek	To New York Rangers Guy Larose
January 22, 1991	To Toronto Maple Leafs Todd Hawkins	To Vancouver Canucks Brian Blad
January 24, 1991	To Toronto Maple Leafs 5th-rd pick – 1991 entry draft (# 102 – Alexei Kudashov)	To Washington Capitals Paul Fenton; John Kordic
January 24, 1991	To Calgary Flames Paul Fenton	To Washington Capitals Ken Sabourin
January 29, 1991	To Quebec Nordiques Jacques Cloutier	To Chicago Blackhawks Tony McKegney

== February ==
February 4, 1991	To Buffalo Sabres Greg Paslawski	To Winnipeg Jets cash
February 4, 1991	To Toronto Maple Leafs 8th-rd pick – 1991 entry draft (# 164 – Robb McIntyre)	To Detroit Red Wings Brad Marsh
February 4, 1991	To Quebec Nordiques Herb Raglan; Andy Rymsha; Tony Twist	To St. Louis Blues Darin Kimble
February 20, 1991	To Hartford Whalers Doug Houda	To Detroit Red Wings Doug Crossman
February 28, 1991	To St. Louis Blues Tom Draper	To Winnipeg Jets future considerations (Jim Vesey)^{1}

1. Trade completed on May 24, 1991.

== March ==
- Trading Deadline: March 5, 1991

March 4, 1991	To Hartford Whalers John Cullen; Jeff Parker; Zarley Zalapski	To Pittsburgh Penguins Ron Francis; Grant Jennings; Ulf Samuelsson
March 5, 1991	To Hartford Whalers Mark Hunter	To Calgary Flames Carey Wilson
March 5, 1991	To Buffalo Sabres Steve Weeks	To Vancouver Canucks future considerations
March 5, 1991	To Buffalo Sabres Tony Tanti	To Pittsburgh Penguins rights to Ken Priestlay
March 5, 1991	To Toronto Maple Leafs 6th-rd pick – 1991 entry draft (# 120 – Alexander Kuzminski)	To Detroit Red Wings Allan Bester
March 5, 1991	To Detroit Red Wings Kevin Miller; Dennis Vial rights to Jim Cummins	To New York Rangers Par Djoos; Joey Kocur
March 5, 1991	To Edmonton Oilers Brad Aitken	To Pittsburgh Penguins Kim Issel
March 5, 1991	To Minnesota North Stars Marc Bureau	To Calgary Flames 3rd-rd pick – 1991 entry draft (# 52 – Sandy McCarthy)
March 5, 1991	To Minnesota North Stars 8th-rd pick – 1991 entry draft (# 174 – Michael Burkett)	To Los Angeles Kings Ilkka Sinisalo
March 5, 1991	To Quebec Nordiques Ryan McGill; Mike McNeill	To Chicago Blackhawks Paul Gillis; Dan Vincelette
March 5, 1991	To Toronto Maple Leafs Keith Osborne	To St. Louis Blues Darren Veitch
March 5, 1991	To Toronto Maple Leafs Robert Mendel	To Washington Capitals Bobby Reynolds
March 5, 1991	To Montreal Canadiens 2nd-rd pick – 1991 entry draft (# 28 – Jim Campbell)	To Philadelphia Flyers Mark Pederson
March 5, 1991	To Vancouver Canucks Dana Murzyn	To Calgary Flames Kevan Guy; Ron Stern
March 5, 1991	To Vancouver Canucks Geoff Courtnall; Robert Dirk; Sergio Momesso; Cliff Ronning; 5th-rd pick – 1992 entry draft (# 110 – Brian Loney)	To St. Louis Blues Garth Butcher; Dan Quinn

== See also ==
- 1990 NHL entry draft
- 1990 in sports
- 1991 in sports
