= Palosaari =

Palosaari may refer to:

== Place ==
- Palosaari, Vaasa (Swedish: Brändö), a major district in Vaasa, Finland
- Palosaari, Helsinki (Swedish: Paloholmen), a former island now part of Korkeasaari in Helsinki, Finland

== Surname ==
Palosaari is a Finnish surname. Notable people with the surname include:

- Esa Palosaari (born 1968), Finnish ice hockey player
- Jim Palosaari (1939–2011), American evangelist and performer

== See also ==
- Pulosari (disambiguation)
