= Everett Sanipass =

Canadian retired ice hockey forward (born 1968)

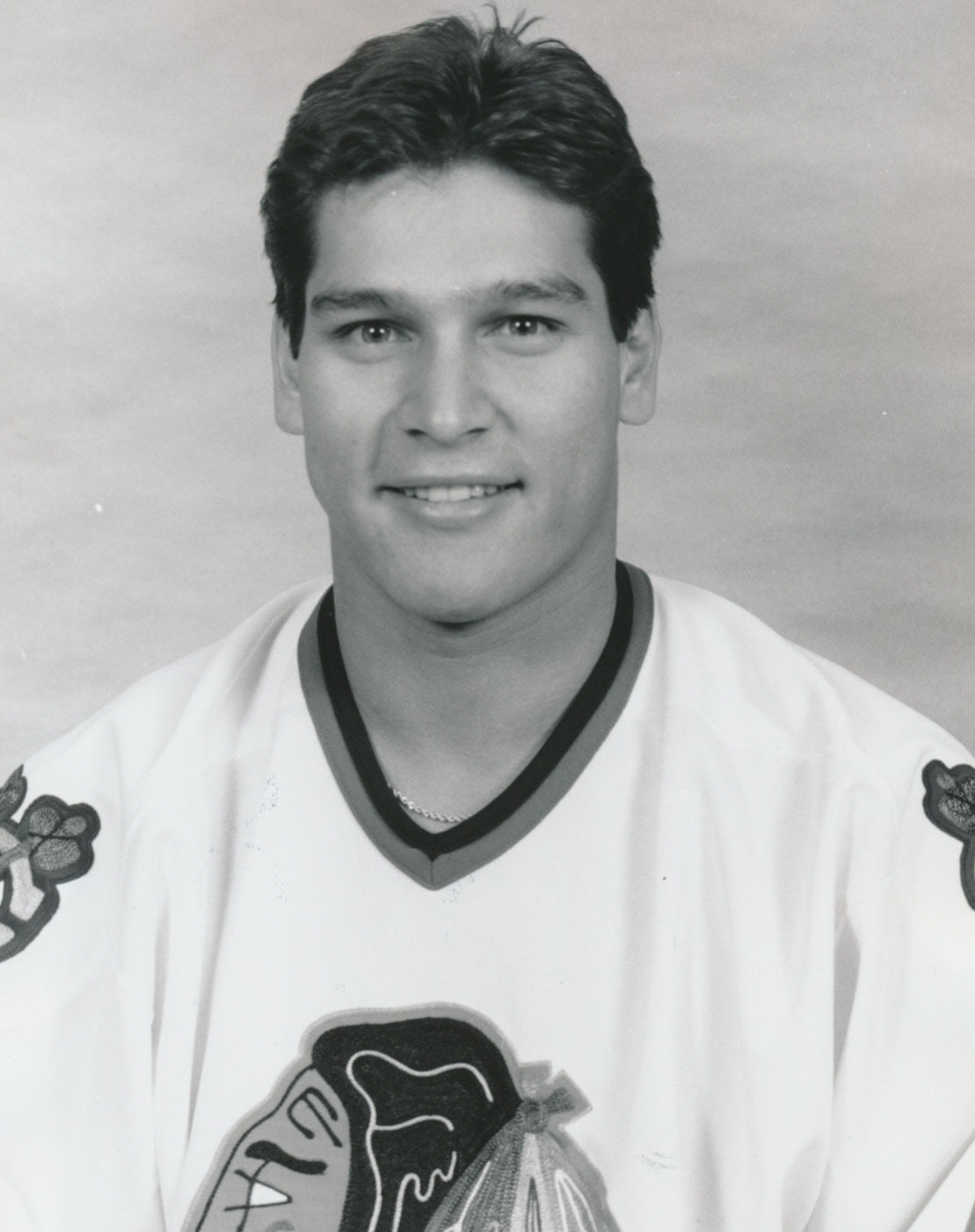
- Sanipass in 1988
- Born: February 13, 1968 (age 58) Elsipogtog First Nation, New Brunswick, Canada
- Height: 6 ft 2 in (188 cm)
- Weight: 204 lb (93 kg; 14 st 8 lb)
- Position: Left wing
- Shot: Left
- Played for: Chicago Blackhawks; Quebec Nordiques
- NHL draft: 14th overall, 1986; Chicago Blackhawks
- Playing career: 1986–1993

Everett Sanipass (born February 13, 1968) is a Canadian retired ice hockey forward. Sanipass was born in Elsipogtog First Nation, New Brunswick. Sanipass is the first Native Canadian to be inducted into the New Brunswick Sports Hall of Fame.

== Playing career ==
Sanipass began his National Hockey League career with the Chicago Blackhawks in 1987 after being drafted 14th overall in the 1986 NHL entry draft. His indigenous heritage as a Mi'kmaq caused him to face racism early in his hockey career since he was prohibited from playing on off-reserve teams. Sanipass was the first native draft pick out of New Brunswick. His tally of forty-three goals and twenty-six assists in only thirty-seven games while playing in the New Brunswick Amateur Hockey Association drawing considerable attention. Sanipass spent 2 seasons with the Chicago Blackhawks before being traded to the Quebec Nordiques.

In 1987, Sanipass was a member of the Canadian U20 Team. Sanipass became famous for his role in the 1987 World Junior Hockey Championship brawl (Punch-up in Piestany) that took place between Canada and the Soviet Union. Both teams left the bench, prompting the referees, who were unable to stop the fighting, to leave the ice surface for their own safety. Officials even tried to turn off the lights with the hopes of causing the players to be so concerned with their own safety that they would stop fighting. Both teams were ultimately kicked out of the tournament for their unsportsmanlike behaviour.

Later in his career, Sanipass would leave the NHL and play for the Halifax Citadels from 1991 to 1993. He would retire from the NSJHL East Hants Penguins in 1995.

== Career statistics ==
=== Regular season and playoffs ===
			Regular season					Playoffs
Season	Team	League	GP	G	A	Pts	PIM	GP	G	A	Pts	PIM
1984–85	Verdun Jr. Canadiens	QMJHL	38	8	10	18	86	12	2	5	7	66
1984–85	Verdun Jr. Canadiens	MC	—	—	—	—	—	2	1	0	1	2
1985–86	Verdun Jr. Canadiens	QMJHL	67	28	66	94	320	5	0	2	2	16
1986–87	Chicago Blackhawks	NHL	7	1	3	4	2	—	—	—	—	—
1986–87	Verdun Jr. Canadiens	QMJHL	23	17	36	53	175	—	—	—	—	—
1986–87	Granby Bisons	QMJHL	11	17	12	29	45	8	6	4	10	48
1987–88	Chicago Blackhawks	NHL	57	8	12	20	126	2	2	0	2	2
1988–89	Chicago Blackhawks	NHL	50	6	9	15	164	3	0	0	0	2
1988–89	Saginaw Hawks	IHL	23	9	12	21	76	—	—	—	—	—
1989–90	Chicago Blackhawks	NHL	12	2	2	4	17	—	—	—	—	—
1989–90	Indianapolis Ice	IHL	33	15	13	28	121	—	—	—	—	—
1989–90	Quebec Nordiques	NHL	9	3	3	6	8	—	—	—	—	—
1990–91	Quebec Nordiques	NHL	29	5	5	10	41	—	—	—	—	—
1990–91	Halifax Citadels	AHL	14	11	7	18	41	—	—	—	—	—
1991–92	Halifax Citadels	AHL	7	3	5	8	31	—	—	—	—	—
1992–93	Halifax Citadels	AHL	9	1	3	4	36	—	—	—	—	—
1993–94	Richibucto Schooners	NBSHL	—	—	—	—	—	7	10	9	19	25
NHL totals			164	25	34	59	358	5	2	0	2	4

=== International ===
Year	Team	Event	GP	G	A	Pts	PIM
1987	Canada	WJC	6	3	2	5	8

Preceded by Dave Manson	Chicago Blackhawks first-round draft pick 1986	Succeeded by Jimmy Waite
