= 1986 NHL entry draft =

1986 North American ice hockey draft

General information
- Date: June 21, 1986
- Location: Montreal Forum; Montreal, Quebec, Canada

Overview
- 252 total selections in 12 rounds
- First selection: (Canada) Joe Murphy (Detroit Red Wings)
- Hall of Famers: 1: D Brian Leetch

The 1986 NHL entry draft was the 24th draft for the National Hockey League. It was held on June 21, 1986, at the Montreal Forum in Montreal. The NHL teams selected 252 players eligible for entry into professional ranks, in the reverse order of the 1985–86 NHL season and playoff standings.

The last active player in the NHL from this draft class was Teppo Numminen, who retired after the 2008–09 season.

== Selections by round ==
Below are listed the selections in the 1986 NHL entry draft. Club teams are located in North America unless otherwise noted.

= NHL All-Star team ·	= NHL All-Star (Note: Players are identified as an All-Star if they were selected for the All-Star game at any time in their career.) ·	= NHL All-Star and NHL All-Star team ·	= Hall of Famers

=== Round one ===
#	Player	Nationality	NHL team	College/junior/club team
1	Joe Murphy (RW)	Canada	Detroit Red Wings	Michigan State University (CCHA)
2	Jimmy Carson (C)	United States	Los Angeles Kings	Verdun Junior Canadiens (QMJHL)
3	Neil Brady (C)	Canada	New Jersey Devils	Medicine Hat Tigers (WHL)
4	Zarley Zalapski (D)	Canada	Pittsburgh Penguins	Canadian National Development Team
5	Shawn Anderson (D)	Canada	Buffalo Sabres	Canadian National Development Team
6	Vincent Damphousse (C)	Canada	Toronto Maple Leafs	Laval Titan (QMJHL)
7	Dan Woodley (RW)	United States	Vancouver Canucks	Portland Winter Hawks (WHL)
8	Pat Elynuik (RW)	Canada	Winnipeg Jets	Prince Albert Raiders (WHL)
9	Brian Leetch (D)	United States	New York Rangers	Avon Old Farms (USHS–CT)
10	Jocelyn Lemieux (RW)	Canada	St. Louis Blues	Laval Voisins (QMJHL)
11	Scott Young (RW)	United States	Hartford Whalers	Boston University (Hockey East)
12	Warren Babe (LW)	Canada	Minnesota North Stars	Lethbridge Broncos (WHL)
13	Craig Janney (C)	United States	Boston Bruins	Boston College (Hockey East)
14	Everett Sanipass (LW)	Canada	Chicago Blackhawks	Verdun Junior Canadiens (QMJHL)
15	Mark Pederson (LW)	Canada	Montreal Canadiens	Medicine Hat Tigers (WHL)
16	George Pelawa (RW)	United States	Calgary Flames	Bemidji High School (USHS–MN)
17	Tom Fitzgerald (RW)	United States	New York Islanders	Austin Preparatory School (MIAA)
18	Ken McRae (RW)	Canada	Quebec Nordiques	Sudbury Wolves (OHL)
19	Jeff Greenlaw (LW)	Canada	Washington Capitals	Canadian National Development Team
20	Kerry Huffman (D)	Canada	Philadelphia Flyers	Guelph Platers (OHL)
21	Kim Issel (RW)	Canada	Edmonton Oilers	Prince Albert Raiders (WHL)
^{Reference:}

=== Round two ===
#	Player	Nationality	NHL team	College/junior/club team
22	Adam Graves (LW)	Canada	Detroit Red Wings	Windsor Compuware Spitfires (OHL)
23	Jukka Seppo (C)	Finland	Philadelphia Flyers (from Los Angeles)^{1}	Sport (Finland)
24	Todd Copeland (D)	United States	New Jersey Devils	Belmont Hill School (ISL)
25	Dave Capuano (LW)	United States	Pittsburgh Penguins	Mount Saint Charles Academy (RIIL)
26	Greg Brown (D)	United States	Buffalo Sabres	St. Mark's School (ISL)
27	Benoit Brunet (LW)	Canada	Montreal Canadiens (from Toronto)^{2}	Hull Olympiques (QMJHL)
28	Kent Hawley (C)	Canada	Philadelphia Flyers (from Vancouver)^{3}	Ottawa 67's (OHL)
29	Teppo Numminen (D)	Finland	Winnipeg Jets	Tappara (Finland)
30	Neil Wilkinson (D)	Canada	Minnesota North Stars (from the Rangers)^{4}	Selkirk Steelers (MJHL)
31	Mike Posma (D)	United States	St. Louis Blues	Buffalo Jr. Sabres (OPJHL)
32	Marc Laforge (D)	Canada	Hartford Whalers	Kingston Canadians (OHL)
33	Dean Kolstad (D)	Canada	Minnesota North Stars	Prince Albert Raiders (WHL)
34	Pekka Tirkkonen (C)	Finland	Boston Bruins	SaPKo (Finland)
35	Mark Kurzawski (D)	United States	Chicago Blackhawks	Windsor Compuware Spitfires (OHL)
36	Darryl Shannon (D)	Canada	Toronto Maple Leafs (from Montreal)^{5}	Windsor Compuware Spitfires (OHL)
37	Brian Glynn (D)	Canada	Calgary Flames	Saskatoon Blades (WHL)
38	Dennis Vaske (D)	United States	New York Islanders	Plymouth Armstrong High School (USHS–MN)
39	Jean-Marc Routhier (RW)	Canada	Quebec Nordiques	Hull Olympiques (QMJHL)
40	Steve Seftel (LW)	Canada	Washington Capitals	Kingston Canadians (OHL)
41	Stephane Guerard (D)	Canada	Quebec Nordiques (from Philadelphia)^{6}	Shawinigan Cataractes (QMJHL)
42	Jamie Nicolls (RW)	Canada	Edmonton Oilers	Portland Winter Hawks (WHL)
^{Reference:}

1. The Los Angeles Kings' second-round pick went to the Philadelphia Flyers as the result of a trade on October 11, 1985 that sent Paul Guay and Philadelphia's fourth-round pick in 1986 NHL Entry Draft to Los Angeles in exchange for Steve Seguin and this pick.
2. The Toronto Maple Leafs' second-round pick went to the Montreal Canadiens as the result of a trade on December 17, 1982 that sent Gaston Gingras to Toronto in exchange for this pick.
3. The Vancouver Canucks' second-round pick went to the Philadelphia Flyers as the result of a trade on June 6, 1986 that sent Dave Richter, Rich Sutter and Philadelphia's third-round pick in 1986 NHL Entry Draft to Vancouver in exchange for Jean-Jacques Daigneault, Vancouver's fifth-round pick in 1987 NHL entry draft and this pick.
4. The New York Rangers' second-round pick went to the Minnesota North Stars as the result of a trade on December 9, 1985 that sent Roland Melanson to the Rangers in exchange for the Ranger's fourth-round pick in 1987 NHL entry draft and this pick.
5. The Montreal Canadiens' second-round pick went to the Toronto Maple Leafs as the result of a trade on September 18, 1985 that sent Dominic Campedelli to Montreal in exchange for Montreal's fourth-round pick in 1986 NHL Entry Draft and this pick.
6. The Philadelphia Flyers' second-round pick went to the Quebec Nordiques as the result of a trade on June 21, 1986 that sent Quebec's second-round pick in 1987 NHL entry draft to Quebec in exchange for this pick.

=== Round three ===
#	Player	Nationality	NHL team	College/junior/club team
43	Derek Mayer (D)	Canada	Detroit Red Wings	University of Denver (WCHA)
44	Denis Larocque (D)	Canada	Los Angeles Kings	Guelph Platers (OHL)
45	Janne Ojanen (C)	Finland	New Jersey Devils	Tappara (Finland)
46	Brad Aitken (LW)	Canada	Pittsburgh Penguins	Sault Ste. Marie Greyhounds (OHL)
47	Bob Corkum (C)	United States	Buffalo Sabres	University of Maine (Hockey East)
48	Sean Boland (D)	Canada	Toronto Maple Leafs	Toronto Marlboros (OHL)
49	Don Gibson (D)	Canada	Vancouver Canucks (from Vancouver via Philadelphia)^{1}	Winkler Flyers (MJHL)
50	Esa Palosaari (RW)	Finland	Winnipeg Jets	Karpat (Finland)
51	Bret Walter (C)	Canada	New York Rangers	University of Alberta (CWUAA)
52	Tony Hejna (LW)	United States	St. Louis Blues	Nichols School (USHS–NY)
53	Shaun Clouston (C)	Canada	New York Rangers (from Hartford)^{2}	University of Alberta (CWUAA)
54	Rick Bennett (LW)	United States	Minnesota North Stars	Wilbraham & Monson Academy (ISL)
55	Rob Zettler (D)	Canada	Minnesota North Stars (from Boston)^{3}	Sault Ste. Marie Greyhounds (OHL)
56	Kevin Kerr (RW)	Canada	Buffalo Sabres (from Chicago)^{4}	Windsor Compuware Spitfires (OHL)
57	Jyrki Lumme (D)	Finland	Montreal Canadiens	Ilves (Finland)
58	Brad Turner (D)	Canada	Minnesota North Stars (from Calgary)^{5}	Calgary Canucks (AJHL)
59	Bill Berg (D)	Canada	New York Islanders	Toronto Marlboros (OHL)
60	Shawn Simpson (G)	Canada	Washington Capitals (from Quebec)^{6}	Sault Ste. Marie Greyhounds (OHL)
61	Jim Hrivnak (G)	Canada	Washington Capitals	Merrimack College (Hockey East)
62	Marc Laniel (D)	Canada	New Jersey Devils (from Philadelphia)^{7}	Oshawa Generals (OHL)
63	Ron Shudra (D)	Canada	Edmonton Oilers	Kamloops Blazers (WHL)
^{Reference: "1986 NHL Entry Draft Picks at hockeydb.com". Archived from the original on February 26, 2009.}

1. The Vancouver Canucks' third-round pick was re-acquired as the result of a trade on June 6, 1986 that sent Jean-Jacques Daigneault, Vancouver's second-round pick in 1986 NHL Entry Draft and fifth-round pick in 1987 NHL entry draft to Philadelphia in exchange for Dave Richter, Rich Sutter and this pick.
  Philadelphia previously acquired this pick as the result of a trade on March 12, 1985 that sent Glen Cochrane to Vancouver in exchange for this pick.
2. The Hartford Whalers' third-round pick went to the New York Rangers as the result of a trade on September 5, 1984 that sent Steve Weeks to Hartford in exchange for future considerations (this pick).
3. The Boston Bruins' third-round pick went to the Minnesota North Stars as the result of a trade on May 16, 1986 that sent Tom McCarthy to Boston in exchange for Boston's second-round pick in 1987 NHL entry draft and this pick.
4. The Chicago Black Hawks' third-round pick went to the Buffalo Sabres as the result of a trade on October 15, 1982 that sent Bob Sauve to Chicago in exchange for this pick.
5. The Calgary Flames' third-round pick went to the Minnesota North Stars as the result of a trade on June 15, 1985 that sent Minnesota's second-round pick in 1985 NHL entry draft and second-round pick in 1987 NHL entry draft to Calgary in exchange for Kent Nilsson and an optional third-round picks in 1986 NHL Entry Draft (this pick) or 1987 NHL entry draft.
6. The Quebec Nordiques' third-round pick went to the Washington Capitals as the result of a trade on March 10, 1986 that sent Peter Andersson to Quebec in exchange for this pick.
7. The Philadelphia Flyers' third-round pick went to the New Jersey Devils as the result of a trade on March 11, 1986 that sent Glenn Resch to Philadelphia in exchange for this pick.

=== Round four ===
#	Player	Nationality	NHL team	College/junior/club team
64	Tim Cheveldae (G)	Canada	Detroit Red Wings	Saskatoon Blades (WHL)
65	Sylvain Couturier (LW)	Canada	Los Angeles Kings	Laval Titan (QMJHL)
66	Anders Carlsson (C)	Sweden	New Jersey Devils	Sodertalje SK (Sweden)
67	Rob Brown (RW)	Canada	Pittsburgh Penguins	Kamloops Blazers (WHL)
68	David Baseggio (D)	Canada	Buffalo Sabres	Yale University (ECAC)
69	Kent Hulst (C)	Canada	Toronto Maple Leafs (from Toronto via Montreal)^{1}	Windsor Compuware Spitfires (OHL)
70	Ronnie Stern (RW)	Canada	Vancouver Canucks	Longueuil Chevaliers (QMJHL)
71	Hannu Jarvenpaa (RW)	Finland	Winnipeg Jets	Karpat (Finland)
72	Mark Janssens (C)	Canada	New York Rangers	Regina Pats (WHL)
73	Glen Featherstone (D)	Canada	St. Louis Blues	Windsor Compuware Spitfires (OHL)
74	Brian Chapman (D)	Canada	Hartford Whalers	Belleville Bulls (OHL)
75	Kirk Tomlinson (LW)	Canada	Minnesota North Stars	Hamilton Steelhawks (OHL)
76	Dean Hall (F)	Canada	Boston Bruins	St. James Canadians (MJHL)
77	Frantisek Kucera (D)	Czechoslovakia	Chicago Blackhawks	Sparta Prague (Czechoslovakia)
78	Brent Bobyck (LW)	Canada	Montreal Canadiens	Notre Dame Hounds (SJHL)
79	Tom Quinlan (RW)	United States	Calgary Flames	Hill-Murray School (USHS–MN)
80	Shawn Byram (LW)	Canada	New York Islanders	Regina Pats (WHL)
81	Ron Tugnutt (G)	Canada	Quebec Nordiques	Peterborough Petes (OHL)
82	Erin Ginnell (C)	Canada	Washington Capitals	Calgary Wranglers (WHL)
83	Mark Bar (D)	Canada	Philadelphia Flyers (from Philadelphia via Los Angeles)^{2}	Peterborough Petes (OHL)
84	Dan Currie (LW)	Canada	Edmonton Oilers	Sault Ste. Marie Greyhounds (OHL)
^{Reference: "1986 NHL Entry Draft Picks at hockeydb.com". Archived from the original on February 26, 2009.}

1. The Toronto Maple Leafs' fourth-round pick was re-acquired as the result of a trade on September 18, 1985 that sent Dominic Campedelli to Montreal in exchange for Montreal's second-round pick in 1986 NHL Entry Draft and this pick.
  Montreal previously acquired this pick as the result of a trade on August 17, 1984 that sent Bill Root to Toronto in exchange for this pick.
2. The Philadelphia Flyers' fourth-round pick was re-acquired as the result of a trade on December 18, 1985 that sent Joe Paterson to Los Angeles in exchange for this pick.
  Los Angeles previously acquired this pick as the result of a trade on October 11, 1985 that sent Steve Seguin and Los Angeles' second-round pick in 1986 NHL Entry Draft to Philadelphia in exchange for Paul Guay and this pick.

=== Round five ===
#	Player	Nationality	NHL team	College/junior/club team
85	Johan Garpenlov (LW)	Sweden	Detroit Red Wings	Nacka HK (Sweden)
86	Dave Guden (LW)	United States	Los Angeles Kings	Roxbury Latin School (ISL)
87	Mike Wolak (C)	United States	St. Louis Blues (from New Jersey)^{1}	Kitchener Rangers (OHL)
88	Sandy Smith (RW)	United States	Pittsburgh Penguins	Brainerd High School (USHS–MN)
89	Larry Rooney (D)	United States	Buffalo Sabres	Thayer Academy (ISL)
90	Scott Taylor (D)	Canada	Toronto Maple Leafs	Kitchener Rangers (OHL)
91	Eric Murano (C)	Canada	Vancouver Canucks	Calgary Canucks (AJHL)
92	Craig Endean (LW)	Canada	Winnipeg Jets	Seattle Thunderbirds (WHL)
93	Jeff Bloemberg (D)	Canada	New York Rangers	North Bay Centennials (OHL)
94	Eric Aubertin (LW)	Canada	Montreal Canadiens (from St. Louis)^{2}	Granby Bisons (QMJHL)
95	Bill Horn (G)	Canada	Hartford Whalers	Western Michigan University (CCHA)
96	Jari Gronstrand (D)	Finland	Minnesota North Stars	Tappara (Finland)
97	Matt Pesklewis (LW)	Canada	Boston Bruins	St. Albert Saints (AJHL)
98	Lonnie Loach (LW)	Canada	Chicago Blackhawks	Guelph Platers (OHL)
99	Mario Milani (RW)	Canada	Montreal Canadiens	Verdun Junior Canadiens (QMJHL)
100	Scott Bloom (LW)	United States	Calgary Flames	Burnsville High School (USHS–MN)
101	Dean Sexsmith (C)	Canada	New York Islanders	Brandon Wheat Kings (WHL)
102	Gerald Bzdel (D)	Canada	Quebec Nordiques	Regina Pats (WHL)
103	John Purves (RW)	Canada	Washington Capitals	Hamilton Steelhawks (OHL)
104	Todd McLellan (C)	Canada	New York Islanders (from Philadelphia)^{3}	Saskatoon Blades (WHL)
105	David Haas (LW)	Canada	Edmonton Oilers	London Knights (OHL)
^{Reference: "1986 NHL Entry Draft Picks at hockeydb.com". Archived from the original on February 26, 2009.}

1. The New Jersey Devils' fifth-round pick went to the St. Louis Blues as the result of a trade on September 19, 1985 that sent Mark Johnson to New Jersey in exchange for Shawn Evans and this pick.
2. The St. Louis Blues' fifth-round pick went to the Montreal Canadiens as the result of a trade on January 31, 1986 that sent Kent Carlson to St. Louis in exchange for Graham Herring and this pick.
3. The Philadelphia Flyers' fifth-round pick went to the New York Islanders as the result of a trade on June 21, 1986 that sent Mike Murray to Philadelphia in exchange for this pick.

=== Round six ===
#	Player	Nationality	NHL team	College/junior/club team
106	Jay Stark (D)	Canada	Detroit Red Wings	Portland Winter Hawks (WHL)
107	Robb Stauber (G)	United States	Los Angeles Kings	Duluth Denfeld High School (USHS–MN)
108	Troy Crowder (RW)	Canada	New Jersey Devils	Hamilton Steelhawks (OHL)
109	Jeff Daniels (LW)	Canada	Pittsburgh Penguins	Oshawa Generals (OHL)
110	Miguel Baldris (D)	Canada	Buffalo Sabres	Shawinigan Cataractes (QMJHL)
111	Stephane Giguere (LW)	Canada	Toronto Maple Leafs	Saint-Jean Castors (QMJHL)
112	Steve Herniman (D)	Canada	Vancouver Canucks	Cornwall Royals (OHL)
113	Rob Bateman (RW)	Canada	Winnipeg Jets	Cégep de Saint-Laurent (CIAU)
114	Darren Turcotte (C)	United States	New York Rangers	North Bay Centennials (OHL)
115	Mike O'Toole (LW)	Canada	St. Louis Blues	Markham Waxers (OJHL)
116	Joe Quinn (RW)	Canada	Hartford Whalers	Calgary Canucks (AJHL)
117	Scott White (D)	Canada	Quebec Nordiques (from Minnesota)^{1}	Michigan Technological University (WCHA)
118	Garth Premak (D)	Canada	Boston Bruins	New Westminster Bruins (WHL)
119	Mario Doyon (D)	Canada	Chicago Blackhawks	Drummondville Voltigeurs (QMJHL)
120	Steve Bisson (D)	Canada	Montreal Canadiens	Sault Ste. Marie Greyhounds (OHL)
121	John Parker (C)	United States	Calgary Flames	White Bear Lake Area High School (USHS–MN)
122	Tony Schmalzbauer (D)	United States	New York Islanders	Hill-Murray School (USHS–MN)
123	Morgan Samuelsson (LW/C)	Sweden	Quebec Nordiques	Boden (Sweden)
124	Stefan Nilsson (C)	Sweden	Washington Capitals	Lulea HF (Sweden)
125	Steve Scheifele (RW)	Canada	Philadelphia Flyers	Stratford Cullitons (MWJBHL)
126	Jim Ennis (D)	Canada	Edmonton Oilers	Boston University (Hockey East)
^{Reference: "1986 NHL Entry Draft Picks at hockeydb.com". Archived from the original on February 26, 2009.}

1. The Minnesota North Stars' sixth-round pick went to the Quebec Nordiques as the result of a trade on November 15, 1985 that sent Ed Lee to Minnesota in exchange for this pick.

=== Round seven ===
#	Player	Nationality	NHL team	College/junior/club team
127	Par Djoos (D)	Sweden	Detroit Red Wings	Mora IK (Sweden)
128	Sean Krakiwsky (RW)	Canada	Los Angeles Kings	Calgary Wranglers (WHL)
129	Kevin Todd (C)	Canada	New Jersey Devils	Prince Albert Raiders (WHL)
130	Doug Hobson (D)	Canada	Pittsburgh Penguins	Prince Albert Raiders (WHL)
131	Mike Hartman (LW)	United States	Buffalo Sabres	North Bay Centennials (OHL)
132	Dan Hie (C)	Canada	Toronto Maple Leafs	Ottawa 67's (OHL)
133	Jon Helgeson (LW)	United States	Vancouver Canucks	Roseau High School (USHS–MN)
134	Mark Vermette (RW)	Canada	Quebec Nordiques (from Winnipeg)^{1}	Lake Superior State University (CCHA)
135	Rob Graham (RW)	United States	New York Rangers	Guelph Platers (OHL)
136	Andy May (F)	Canada	St. Louis Blues	Bramalea Blues (MetJHL)
137	Steve Torrel (C)	United States	Hartford Whalers	Hibbing High School (USHS–MN)
138	Will Andersen (D)	Canada	New York Islanders (from Minnesota)^{2}	Victoria Cougars (WHL)
139	Paul Beraldo (C)	Canada	Boston Bruins	Sault Ste. Marie Greyhounds (OHL)
140	Mike Hudson (C)	Canada	Chicago Blackhawks	Sudbury Wolves (OHL)
141	Lyle Odelein (D)	Canada	Montreal Canadiens	Moose Jaw Warriors (WHL)
142	Rick Lessard (D)	Canada	Calgary Flames	Ottawa 67's (OHL)
143	Rich Pilon (D)	Canada	New York Islanders	Prince Albert Raiders (WHL)
144	Jean-Francois Nault (C)	Canada	Quebec Nordiques	Granby Bisons (QMJHL)
145	Peter Choma (RW)	Canada	Washington Capitals	Belleville Bulls (OHL)
146	Sami Wahlsten (F)	Finland	Philadelphia Flyers	TPS (Finland)
147	Ivan Matulik (RW)	Czechoslovakia	Edmonton Oilers	Slovan Bratislava (Czechoslovakia)
^{Reference: "1986 NHL Entry Draft Picks at hockeydb.com". Archived from the original on February 26, 2009.}

1. The Winnipeg Jets' seventh-round pick went to the Quebec Nordiques as the result of a trade on October 14, 1985 that sent Dan Bouchard to Winnipeg in exchange for this pick.
2. The Minnesota North Stars' seventh-round pick went to the New York Islanders as the result of a trade on September 9, 1985 that sent Mats Hallin to Minnesota in exchange for this pick.

=== Round eight ===
#	Player	Nationality	NHL team	College/junior/club team
148	Dean Morton (D)	Canada	Detroit Red Wings	Oshawa Generals (OHL)
149	Rene Chapdelaine (D)	Canada	Los Angeles Kings	Lake Superior State University (CCHA)
150	Ryan Pardoski (LW)	Canada	New Jersey Devils	Calgary Canucks (AJHL)
151	Steve Rohlik (LW)	United States	Pittsburgh Penguins	Hill-Murray School (USHS–MN)
152	Francois Guay (C)	Canada	Buffalo Sabres	Laval Titan (QMJHL)
153	Steve Brennan (F)	United States	Toronto Maple Leafs	New Preparatory School (USHS–MA)
154	Jeff Noble (C)	Canada	Vancouver Canucks	Kitchener Rangers (OHL)
155	Frank Furlan (G)	Canada	Winnipeg Jets	Sherwood Park Crusaders (AJHL)
156	Barry Chyzowski (C)	Canada	New York Rangers	St. Albert Saints (AJHL)
157	Randy Skarda (D)	United States	St. Louis Blues	Saint Thomas Academy (USHS–MN)
158	Ron Hoover (LW)	Canada	Hartford Whalers	Western Michigan University (CCHA)
159	Scott Mathias (C)	United States	Minnesota North Stars	University of Denver (WCHA)
160	Brian Ferreira (RW)	United States	Boston Bruins	Falmouth High School (MIAA)
161	Marty Nanne (RW)	United States	Chicago Blackhawks	University of Minnesota (WCHA)
162	Rick Hayward (D)	United States	Montreal Canadiens	Hull Olympiques (QMJHL)
163	Mark Olsen (D)	United States	Calgary Flames	Colorado College (WCHA)
164	Peter Harris (G)	United States	New York Islanders	Haverhill High School (MIAA)
165	Keith Miller (LW)	Canada	Quebec Nordiques	Guelph Platers (OHL)
166	Lee Davidson (C)	Canada	Washington Capitals	Penticton Knights (BCHL)
167	Murray Baron (D)	Canada	Philadelphia Flyers	Vernon Lakers (BCJHL)
168	Nick Beaulieu (LW)	Canada	Edmonton Oilers	Drummondville Voltigeurs (QMJHL)
^{Reference: "1986 NHL Entry Draft Picks at hockeydb.com". Archived from the original on February 26, 2009.}

=== Round nine ===
#	Player	Nationality	NHL team	College/junior/club team
169	Marc Potvin (RW)	Canada	Detroit Red Wings	Stratford Cullitons (WOJBHL)
170	Trevor Pochipinski (D)	Canada	Los Angeles Kings	Penticton Knights (BCJHL)
171	Scott McCormack (F)	United States	New Jersey Devils	St. Paul's School (ISL)
172	Dave McLlwain (C)	Canada	Pittsburgh Penguins	North Bay Centennials (OHL)
173	Sean Whitham (D)	Canada	Buffalo Sabres	Providence College (Hockey East)
174	Brian Bellefeuille (RW)	United States	Toronto Maple Leafs	Canterbury School (USHS–CT)
175	Matt Merten (G)	Canada	Vancouver Canucks	Stratford Cullitons (WOJBHL)
176	Mark Green (LW)	United States	Winnipeg Jets	New Hampton School (USHS–NH)
177	Pat Scanlon (F)	United States	New York Rangers	Cretin-Derham Hall High School (USHS–MN)
178	Martyn Ball (LW)	Canada	St. Louis Blues	St. Michael's Buzzers (MetJHL)
179	Rob Glasgow (RW)	Canada	Hartford Whalers	Sherwood Park Crusaders (AJHL)
180	Lance Pitlick (D)	United States	Minnesota North Stars	Robbinsdale Cooper High School (USHS–MN)
181	Jeff Flaherty (RW)	United States	Boston Bruins	Weymouth High School (MIAA)
182	Geoff Benic (LW)	Canada	Chicago Blackhawks	Windsor Compuware Spitfires (OHL)
183	Antonin Routa (D)	Czechoslovakia	Montreal Canadiens	Poldi SONP Kladno (Czechoslovakia)
184	Scott Sharples (G)	Canada	Calgary Flames	Penticton Knights (BCJHL)
185	Jeff Jablonski (LW)	United States	New York Islanders	London Diamonds (WOJBHL)
186	Pierre Millier (D)	Canada	Quebec Nordiques	Chicoutimi Sagueneens (QMJHL)
187	Tero Toivola (RW)	Finland	Washington Capitals	Tappara (Finland)
188	Blaine Rude (RW)	United States	Philadelphia Flyers	Fergus Falls Senior High School (USHS–MN)
189	Mike Greenlay (G)	Canada	Edmonton Oilers	Calgary Midgets All-Stars (CAAAMHL)
^{Reference: "1986 NHL Entry Draft Picks at hockeydb.com". Archived from the original on February 26, 2009.}

=== Round ten ===
#	Player	Nationality	NHL team	College/junior/club team
190	Scott King (G)	Canada	Detroit Red Wings	Vernon Lakers (BCJHL)
191	Paul Kelly (RW)	Canada	Los Angeles Kings	Guelph Platers (OHL)
192	Frederic Chabot (G)	Canada	New Jersey Devils	Ste-Foy Midget All Stars (LMAAAQ)
193	Kelly Cain (C)	Canada	Pittsburgh Penguins	London Knights (OHL)
194	Kenton Rein (G)	Canada	Buffalo Sabres	Prince Albert Raiders (WHL)
195	Sean Davidson (RW)	Canada	Toronto Maple Leafs	Toronto Marlboros (OHL)
196	Marc Lyons (D)	Canada	Vancouver Canucks	Kingston Canadians (OHL)
197	John Blue (G)	United States	Winnipeg Jets	University of Minnesota (WCHA)
198	Joe Ranger (D)	Canada	New York Rangers	London Knights (OHL)
199	Rod Thacker (D)	Canada	St. Louis Blues	Hamilton Steelhawks (OHL)
200	Sean Evoy (G)	Canada	Hartford Whalers	Cornwall Royals (OHL)
201	Dan Keczmer (D)	United States	Minnesota North Stars	Detroit Little Caesars (MWEHL)
202	Greg Hawgood (D)	Canada	Boston Bruins	Kamloops Blazers (WHL)
203	Glenn Lowes (LW)	Canada	Chicago Blackhawks	Toronto Marlboros (OHL)
204	Eric Bohemier (G)	Canada	Montreal Canadiens	Hull Olympiques (QMJHL)
205	Doug Pickell (LW)	Canada	Calgary Flames	Kamloops Blazers (WHL)
206	Kerry Clark (RW)	Canada	New York Islanders	Saskatoon Blades (WHL)
207	Chris Lappin (D)	United States	Quebec Nordiques	Canterbury School (USHS–CT)
208	Bob Babcock (D)	Canada	Washington Capitals	Sault Ste. Marie Greyhounds (OHL)
209	Shaun Sabol (D)	United States	Philadelphia Flyers	St. Paul Vulcans (USHL)
210	Matt Lanza (D)	United States	Edmonton Oilers	Winthrop High School (MIAA)
^{Reference: "1986 NHL Entry Draft Picks at hockeydb.com". Archived from the original on February 26, 2009.}

=== Round eleven ===
#	Player	Nationality	NHL team	College/junior/club team
211	Tom Bissett (LW)	United States	Detroit Red Wings	Michigan Technological University (WCHA)
212	Russ Mann (D)	United States	Los Angeles Kings	St. Lawrence University (ECAC)
213	John Andersen (C)	Canada	New Jersey Devils	Oshawa Generals (OHL)
214	Stan Drulia (RW)	United States	Pittsburgh Penguins	Belleville Bulls (OHL)
215	Troy Arndt (D)	Canada	Buffalo Sabres	Portland Winter Hawks (WHL)
216	Mark Holick (RW)	Canada	Toronto Maple Leafs	Saskatoon Blades (WHL)
217	Todd Hawkins (LW)	Canada	Vancouver Canucks	Belleville Bulls (OHL)
218	Matt Cote (D)	Canada	Winnipeg Jets	Lake Superior State University (CCHA)
219	Russ Parent (D)	Canada	New York Rangers	Winnipeg South Blues (MJHL)
220	Terry MacLean (C)	Canada	St. Louis Blues	Longueuil Chevaliers (QMJHL)
221	Cal Brown (D)	Canada	Hartford Whalers	Penticton Knights (BCJHL)
222	Garth Joy (D)	Canada	Minnesota North Stars	Hamilton Steelhawks (OHL)
223	Staffan Malmqvist (F)	Sweden	Boston Bruins	Leksands IF (Sweden)
224	Chris Thayer (C)	United States	Chicago Blackhawks	Kent School (USHS–CT)
225	Charlie Moore (LW)	Canada	Montreal Canadiens	Belleville Bulls (OHL)
226	Anders Lindstrom (C)	Sweden	Calgary Flames	Timra IK (Sweden)
227	Dan Beaudette (RW)	United States	New York Islanders	Saint Thomas Academy (USHS–MN)
228	Martin Latreille (D)	Canada	Quebec Nordiques	Laval Titan (QMJHL)
229	John Schratz (D)	Canada	Washington Capitals	Amherst Ramblers (MVLHL)
230	Brett Lawrence (RW)	United States	Philadelphia Flyers	Rochester Jr. Americans (EJHL)
231	Mojmir Bozik (D)	Czechoslovakia	Edmonton Oilers	VSZ Kosice (Czechoslovakia)
^{Reference: "1986 NHL Entry Draft Picks at hockeydb.com". Archived from the original on February 26, 2009.}

=== Round twelve ===
#	Player	Nationality	NHL team	College/junior/club team
232	Peter Ekroth (D)	Sweden	Detroit Red Wings	Sodertalje SK (Sweden)
233	Brian Hayton (D)	Canada	Los Angeles Kings	Guelph Platers (OHL)
234	Bill Butler (LW)	United States	St. Louis Blues (from New Jersey)^{1}	Northwood School (USHS–NY)
235	Rob Wilson (D)	Canada	Pittsburgh Penguins	Sudbury Wolves (OHL)
236	Doug Kirton (RW)	Canada	New Jersey Devils (from Buffalo)^{2}	Orillia Travelways (CBHL)
237	Brian Hoard (D)	Canada	Toronto Maple Leafs	Hamilton Steelhawks (OHL)
238	Vladimir Krutov (LW)	Soviet Union	Vancouver Canucks	CSKA Moscow (USSR)
239	Arto Blomsten (D)	Finland	Winnipeg Jets	Djurgardens IF (Sweden)
240	Soren True (LW)	Denmark	New York Rangers	Skovbakken (Denmark)
241	David O'Brien (RW)	United States	St. Louis Blues	Northeastern University (Hockey East)
242	Brian Verbeek (C)	Canada	Hartford Whalers	Kingston Canadians (OHL)
243	Kurt Stahura (LW)	United States	Minnesota North Stars	Williston Academy (ISL)
244	Joel Gardner (C)	Canada	Boston Bruins	Sarnia Legionnaires (WOJBHL)
245	Sean Williams (C)	Canada	Chicago Blackhawks	Oshawa Generals (OHL)
246	Karel Svoboda (F)	Czechoslovakia	Montreal Canadiens	CHZ Litvinov (Czechoslovakia)
247	Antonin Stavjana (D)	Czechoslovakia	Calgary Flames	TJ Gottwaldov (Czechoslovakia)
248	Paul Thompson (D)	Canada	New York Islanders	Northern Manitoba AAA All-Stars (MAAAMHL)
249	Sean Boudreault (F)	United States	Quebec Nordiques	Mount Saint Charles Academy (RIIL)
250	Scott McCrory (C)	Canada	Washington Capitals	Oshawa Generals (OHL)
251	Dan Stephano (G)	United States	Philadelphia Flyers	Northwood School (USHS–NY)
252	Tony Hand (C)	United Kingdom	Edmonton Oilers	Murrayfield Racers (Great Britain)
^{Reference: "1986 NHL Entry Draft Picks at hockeydb.com". Archived from the original on February 26, 2009.}

1. The New Jersey Devils' twelfth-round pick went to the St. Louis Blues as the result of a trade on August 29, 1985 that sent Perry Anderson to New Jersey in exchange for Rick Meagher and this pick.
2. The Buffalo Sabres' twelfth-round pick went to the New Jersey Devils as the result of a trade on March 11, 1986 that sent Phil Russell to Buffalo in exchange for this pick.

== Draftees based on nationality ==
Rank	Country	Amount
	North America	222
1	Canada	159
2	United States	63
	Europe	30
3	Finland	11
4	Sweden	8
5	Czechoslovakia	8
6	Soviet Union	1
6	Denmark	1
6	United Kingdom	1

== See also ==
- 1986 NHL supplemental draft
- 1986–87 NHL season
- List of NHL players
