= Brian Verbeek =

Canadian ice hockey player

- Born: October 22, 1966 (age 59) Wyoming, Ontario, Canada
- Height: 5 ft 9 in (175 cm)
- Weight: 194 lb (88 kg; 13 st 12 lb)
- Position: Centre
- Shot: Left
- Played for: Salt Lake Golden Eagles; KooKoo; Binghamton Whalers; Boxers de Bordeaux
- NHL draft: 242nd overall, 1986; Hartford Whalers
- Playing career: 1986–1990; 1994–1995

Brian Verbeek (born October 22, 1966) is a Canadian former professional ice hockey centre. He is the younger brother of former NHL player Pat Verbeek.

Verbeek was drafted 242nd overall by the Hartford Whalers in the 1986 NHL entry draft. He turned professional the same year, spending a season with the Salt Lake Golden Eagles of the International Hockey League. He then played a season in Finland, playing two games in SM-liiga for KooKoo and 17 games in the 1. Divisioona for Karhu-Kissat. Verbeek then played 27 games for the American Hockey League's Binghamton Whalers during the 1988–89 season.

He is currently the head coach of the Potomac Patriots of the United States Premier Hockey League. As head coach, he led the 2024-2025 Patriots Premier team to USPHL Nationals Tournament, winning the Southeast Region Divisional Playoffs, defeating the Hampton Roads Whalers 5-4 (OT) on Tuesday March 4, 2025.
