= Jean-Marc Routhier =

Canadian ice hockey player

- Born: February 2, 1968 (age 58) Quebec City, Quebec, Canada
- Height: 6 ft 2 in (188 cm)
- Weight: 190 lb (86 kg; 13 st 8 lb)
- Position: Right wing
- Shot: Right
- Played for: AHL; Halifax Citadels; NHL; Quebec Nordiques
- NHL draft: 39th overall, 1986; Quebec Nordiques
- Playing career: 1988–1990

Jean-Marc Routhier (born February 2, 1968) is a Canadian former professional ice hockey player who played eight games for the Quebec Nordiques of the National Hockey League.

Routhier was born in Quebec City, Quebec, Canada.

== Career statistics ==
			Regular season					Playoffs
Season	Team	League	GP	G	A	Pts	PIM	GP	G	A	Pts	PIM
1985–86	Hull Olympiques	QMJHL	71	18	16	34	111	15	3	6	9	27
1986–87	Hull Olympiques	QMJHL	59	17	18	35	98	—	—	—	—	—
1987–88	Victoriaville Tigres	QMJHL	57	16	28	44	267	2	0	0	0	5
1988–89	Halifax Citadels	AHL	52	13	13	26	189	4	1	1	2	16
1989–90	Halifax Citadels	AHL	17	4	8	12	29	—	—	—	—	—
1989–90	Quebec Nordiques	NHL	8	0	0	0	9	—	—	—	—	—
1997–98	Quebec Aces	QSPHL	19	7	17	24	43	—	—	—	—	—
NHL totals			8	0	0	0	9	—	—	—	—	—
