= Ronnie Stern =

Canadian ice hockey player

- Born: January 11, 1967 (age 59) Sainte-Agathe-des-Monts, Quebec, Canada
- Height: 6 ft 0 in (183 cm)
- Weight: 195 lb (88 kg; 13 st 13 lb)
- Position: Right wing
- Shot: Right
- Played for: Vancouver Canucks; Calgary Flames; San Jose Sharks
- NHL draft: 70th overall, 1986; Vancouver Canucks
- Playing career: 1987–2000

Ronald Stern (born January 11, 1967) is a Canadian former professional ice hockey player who played in the National Hockey League for 12 seasons with the Vancouver Canucks, Calgary Flames, and San Jose Sharks.

== Playing career ==
Stern was born in Sainte-Agathe-des-Monts, Quebec, Canada, and is Jewish. He played for 3 years in the QMJHL with the Longueuil Chevaliers, establishing himself as an enforcer with a scoring touch. His strong play led him to be drafted by the Vancouver Canucks in the 4th round, 70th overall, in the 1986 NHL entry draft.

After being drafted by the Canucks, Stern returned to the Chevaliers for one final year before turning pro for the 1987–88 season. That year he played the majority of the season with the Flint Spirits of the IHL, appearing in 55 games and registering 294 Penalty Minutes. He also made his debut with the Canucks, playing in 15 games. For the next three years Stern bounced between the Canucks and their minor league affiliate Milwaukee Admirals.

At the trade deadline near the end of the 1990–1991 season Stern was traded from the Canucks to the Calgary Flames in a deal for Dana Murzyn. In Calgary, Stern established himself as a full-time NHL player and earned a reputation as a feared fighter amongst fellow NHL heavyweights at six feet and more than 200 pounds. Stern played the majority of his NHL career with the Flames, spending 6 years with the team and enjoying his best success in the NHL. He set career highs with 13 goals in the 1991–92 campaign, and with 29 points in 1993–94.

Stern missed the entire 1997–1998 season recovering from knee surgery but was signed by the San Jose Sharks upon recovery. He played two seasons with the Sharks before retiring in 2000. He scored the first goal in Game 7 of the Sharks upset over the top seed St. Louis Blues in 2000.

As of April 5, 2007, Stern ranked 44th all-time in NHL penalty minutes with 2077 PIM. Over the course of his career, he registered 75 goals and 86 assists for 161 points in 638 NHL games.

Stern is also cousins with American hockey player, Will Hershon.

== Career statistics ==
			Regular season					Playoffs
Season	Team	League	GP	G	A	Pts	PIM	GP	G	A	Pts	PIM
1983–84	Laval Laurentides	QAAA	39	6	6	12	32	6	0	2	2	4
1984–85	Longueuil Chevaliers	QMJHL	68	6	14	20	176	—	—	—	—	—
1985–86	Longueuil Chevaliers	QMJHL	70	39	33	72	319	—	—	—	—	—
1986–87	Longueuil Chevaliers	QMJHL	56	32	39	71	266	19	11	9	20	55
1986–87	Longueuil Chevaliers	M-Cup	—	—	—	—	—	4	1	0	1	69
1987–88	Vancouver Canucks	NHL	15	0	0	0	52	—	—	—	—	—
1987–88	Fredericton Express	AHL	2	1	0	1	4	—	—	—	—	—
1987–88	Flint Spirits	IHL	55	14	19	33	294	16	8	8	16	94
1988–89	Vancouver Canucks	NHL	17	1	0	1	49	3	0	1	1	17
1988–89	Milwaukee Admirals	IHL	45	19	23	42	280	5	1	0	1	11
1989–90	Vancouver Canucks	NHL	34	2	3	5	208	—	—	—	—	—
1989–90	Milwaukee Admirals	IHL	26	8	9	17	165	—	—	—	—	—
1990–91	Vancouver Canucks	NHL	31	2	3	5	171	—	—	—	—	—
1990–91	Milwaukee Admirals	IHL	7	2	2	4	81	—	—	—	—	—
1990–91	Calgary Flames	NHL	13	1	3	4	69	7	1	3	4	14
1991–92	Calgary Flames	NHL	72	13	9	22	338	—	—	—	—	—
1992–93	Calgary Flames	NHL	70	10	15	25	207	6	0	0	0	43
1993–94	Calgary Flames	NHL	71	9	20	29	243	7	2	0	2	12
1994–95	Calgary Flames	NHL	39	9	4	13	163	7	3	1	4	8
1995–96	Calgary Flames	NHL	52	10	5	15	111	4	0	2	2	8
1996–97	Calgary Flames	NHL	79	7	10	17	157	—	—	—	—	—
1998–99	San Jose Sharks	NHL	78	7	9	16	158	6	0	0	0	6
1999–2000	San Jose Sharks	NHL	67	4	5	9	151	3	1	0	1	11
NHL totals			638	75	86	161	2,077	43	7	7	14	119

== See also ==
- List of select Jewish ice hockey players
- List of NHL players with 2,000 career penalty minutes
