= Jimmy Carson =

American ice hockey player (born 1968)

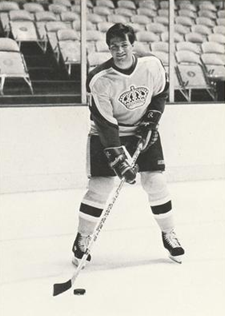
- Carson with the Los Angeles Kings in 1986
- Born: July 20, 1968 (age 58) Southfield, Michigan, U.S.
- Height: 6 ft 1 in (185 cm)
- Weight: 200 lb (91 kg; 14 st 4 lb)
- Position: Center
- Shot: Right
- Played for: Los Angeles Kings; Edmonton Oilers; Detroit Red Wings; Vancouver Canucks; Hartford Whalers; Lausanne
- National team: United States
- NHL draft: 2nd overall, 1986; Los Angeles Kings
- Playing career: 1986–1998

James Charles Carson (born July 20, 1968) is an American former professional ice hockey player. He played 10 seasons in the National Hockey League (NHL) with five different teams. In 1988, he set the record for most goals scored in a season by a teenager with 55 goals, which made him the second to score 50 goals in a season and first since Wayne Gretzky (the next person to score 50 goals as a teenager was Steven Stamkos in 2007).

== Playing career ==
As a youth, Carson played in the 1980 and 1981 Quebec International Pee-Wee Hockey Tournaments with the Detroit Compuware minor ice hockey team.

Carson was drafted by the Los Angeles Kings in the 1986 NHL entry draft as the second overall pick. He scored 37 goals as an 18-year-old rookie in the 1986–87 NHL season. In just his second NHL season he notched 55 goals, establishing himself as one of the sport's top young players and setting a single season NHL record for most goals by a United States-born player. The record was matched by Kevin Stevens in the 1992–93 NHL season but not surpassed until Auston Matthews scored 60 in the 2021-22 season. At the end of his second season, Carson was part of the August 9, 1988, blockbuster trade that sent him, Martin Gélinas, the Kings' three first-round draft picks in 1989, 1991 and 1993, and $15 million cash to the Edmonton Oilers for Wayne Gretzky, Marty McSorley and Mike Krushelnyski.

Carson demanded a trade out of Edmonton to an American-based team in October 1989, stating, "It was very difficult for me to play in Edmonton in the whole Gretzky syndrome. I never wanted to play in Edmonton. I had just turned 20. I had bought a house in L.A., and suddenly I was gone." He was traded to his hometown of Detroit along with Kevin McClelland and a fifth-round draft pick for Adam Graves, Petr Klíma, Joe Murphy and Jeff Sharples. These players were instrumental in helping Edmonton win their fifth Stanley Cup in seven years in 1990.

Carson later returned to Los Angeles in January 1993, following a trade for popular all-star defenseman Paul Coffey. He played with Gretzky and the Kings for parts of two seasons, but never regained the scoring touch he had early in his career. He later played for the Vancouver Canucks and the Hartford Whalers, where he ended his NHL career in 1996.

From 1996-1998 Carson played for his hometown Detroit Vipers of the International Hockey League. He was a member of the 1997 Turner Cup-winning team.

Carson represented the United States in the 1986 World Junior Ice Hockey Championships and the 1987 World Ice Hockey Championships.

Carson participated in the Red Wings versus Toronto Maple Leafs alumni game before the 2014 NHL Winter Classic at Comerica Park.

== Personal life ==
Carson is of Greek descent; his grandfather changed the family name from Kyriazopoulos to Carson upon immigrating to the United States.

While still a player in the NHL, Carson began to prepare for a post-hockey career by earning certifications in financial planning in 1992. When his playing career ended, he joined Northwestern Mutual.

Carson and his wife have four children and reside in the Metro Detroit area. They have three sons and one daughter.

== Achievements ==
- Played in 1989 NHL All-Star Game.
- Named to the NHL All-Rookie Team in 1987.
- NHL single-season record for games played with 86, 1992–93 shared with Bob Kudelski who also played 86 games in 1993-94
- Most goals as a teenager in NHL history- 92 goals
- Only Wayne Gretzky (20 years, 40 days old) scored 100 goals at a younger age than Jimmy Carson who achieved the feat at 20 years, 116 days old.

== Career statistics ==
=== Regular season and playoffs ===
			Regular season					Playoffs
Season	Team	League	GP	G	A	Pts	PIM	GP	G	A	Pts	PIM
1983–84	Detroit Compuware Ambassadors	MNHL	65	85	74	159	—	—	—	—	—	—
1984–85	Verdun Junior Canadiens	QMJHL	68	44	72	116	16	14	9	17	26	12
1984–85	Verdun Junior Canadiens	M-Cup	—	—	—	—	—	3	0	1	1	4
1985–86	Verdun Junior Canadiens	QMJHL	69	70	83	153	46	5	2	6	8	0
1986–87	Los Angeles Kings	NHL	80	37	42	79	22	5	1	2	3	6
1987–88	Los Angeles Kings	NHL	80	55	52	107	45	5	5	3	8	4
1988–89	Edmonton Oilers	NHL	80	49	51	100	36	7	2	1	3	6
1989–90	Edmonton Oilers	NHL	4	1	2	3	0	—	—	—	—	—
1989–90	Detroit Red Wings	NHL	44	20	16	36	8	—	—	—	—	—
1990–91	Detroit Red Wings	NHL	64	21	25	46	28	7	2	1	3	4
1991–92	Detroit Red Wings	NHL	80	34	35	69	30	11	2	3	5	0
1992–93	Detroit Red Wings	NHL	52	25	26	51	18	—	—	—	—	—
1992–93	Los Angeles Kings	NHL	34	12	10	22	14	18	5	4	9	2
1993–94	Los Angeles Kings	NHL	25	4	7	11	2	—	—	—	—	—
1993–94	Vancouver Canucks	NHL	34	10	7	17	22	2	0	1	1	0
1994–95	Hartford Whalers	NHL	38	9	10	19	29	—	—	—	—	—
1995–96	Lausanne HC	NDA	13	3	4	7	14	—	—	—	—	—
1995–96	Hartford Whalers	NHL	11	1	0	1	0	—	—	—	—	—
1996–97	Detroit Vipers	IHL	18	7	16	23	4	13	4	6	10	12
1997–98	Detroit Vipers	IHL	49	10	28	38	34	9	3	4	7	6
NHL totals			626	275	286	561	254	55	17	15	32	22

=== International ===
Year	Team	Event	GP	G	A	Pts	PIM
1986	United States	WJC	7	4	1	5	0
1987	United States	WC	10	2	3	5	4
Junior totals			7	4	1	5	0
Senior totals			10	2	3	5	4

== See also ==
- List of NHL players with 100-point seasons

Preceded by Dan Gratton	Los Angeles Kings first-round draft pick 1986	Succeeded by Wayne McBean
