= Marty Nanne =

American ice hockey player

- Born: July 21, 1967 (age 58) Edina, Minnesota, U.S.
- Height: 6 ft 0 in (183 cm)
- Weight: 180 lb (82 kg; 12 st 12 lb)
- Position: Right wing
- Shot: Right
- Played for: IHL; Saginaw Hawks; Indianapolis Ice
- NHL draft: 161st overall, 1986; Chicago Blackhawks
- Playing career: 1988–1991

Marty Nanne (born July 21, 1967) is an American former professional ice hockey player. He is currently an amateur scout within the Minnesota Wild organization of the National Hockey League. Nanne was selected by the Chicago Blackhawks in the 8th round (161st overall) of the 1986 NHL entry draft.

He is the son of long-time NHL general manager Lou Nanne, and the father of Louie Nanne (born June 18, 1994), who was the 7th round pick of the Minnesota Wild in the 2012 NHL entry draft.

Nanne played three seasons (1988-1991) in the International Hockey League with the Saginaw Hawks and the Indianapolis Ice, registering 10 goals, 32 points, and 111 penalty minutes in 109 professional games played.

== Career statistics ==
			Regular season					Playoffs
Season	Team	League	GP	G	A	Pts	PIM	GP	G	A	Pts	PIM
1985–86	University of Minnesota	NCAA	20	5	5	10	20	—	—	—	—	—
1986–87	University of Minnesota	NCAA	31	3	4	7	41	—	—	—	—	—
1987–88	University of Minnesota	NCAA	17	1	3	4	16	—	—	—	—	—
1988–89	Saginaw Hawks	IHL	36	4	10	14	47	—	—	—	—	—
1989–90	Indianapolis Ice	IHL	50	3	3	6	36	—	—	—	—	—
1990–91	Indianapolis Ice	IHL	23	3	9	12	28	6	0	0	0	8
IHL totals			109	10	22	32	111	6	0	0	0	8
