= Sami Wahlsten =

Finnish ice hockey player

- Born: November 25, 1967 (age 58) Turku, Finland
- Height: 6 ft 1 in (185 cm)
- Weight: 185 lb (84 kg; 13 st 3 lb)
- Position: Right wing
- Shot: Left
- Played for: TPS; Jokerit; Ilves
- National team: Finland
- NHL draft: 146th overall, 1986; Philadelphia Flyers
- Playing career: 1984–2002

Sami Wahlsten (born November 25, 1967) is a Finnish former professional ice hockey player who primarily played in the Finnish Liiga. Wahlsten was drafted in the seventh round of the 1986 NHL entry draft by the Philadelphia Flyers, but he never played professionally in North America. He spent most of his professional career in Finland, playing nine seasons in the Liiga with TPS, Jokerit, and Ilves. He is the son of Juhani Wahlsten and brother of Jali Wahlsten.
