= Shane MacEachern =

Canadian ice hockey player

- Born: December 14, 1967 (age 57); Charlottetown, Prince Edward Island, Canada
- Height: 5 ft 11 in (180 cm)
- Weight: 179 lb (81 kg; 12 st 11 lb)
- Position: Centre
- Shot: Left
- Played for: St. Louis Blues; Peterborough Pirates; Eaters Geleen
- NHL draft: Undrafted
- Playing career: 1987–1995

Shane MacEachern (born December 14, 1967) is a Canadian former professional ice hockey centre. He played one game in the National Hockey League with the St. Louis Blues in the 1987–88 season, on January 2, 1988 against the Calgary Flames. The rest of his career, which lasted from 1987 to 1995, was spent in the minor leagues and Europe.

== Career statistics ==
=== Regular season and playoffs ===
			Regular season					Playoffs
Season	Team	League	GP	G	A	Pts	PIM	GP	G	A	Pts	PIM
1983–84	Verdun Juniors	QMJHL	65	13	27	40	62	10	3	5	8	30
1984–85	Verdun Junior Canadiens	QMJHL	57	14	21	35	112	13	1	3	4	27
1984–85	Verdun Junior Canadiens	M-Cup	—	—	—	—	—	3	0	0	0	10
1985–86	Verdun Junior Canadiens	QMJHL	43	15	30	45	88	—	—	—	—	—
1985–86	Hull Olympiques	QMJHL	27	5	15	20	35	15	11	11	22	17
1985–86	Hull Olympiques	M-Cup	—	—	—	—	—	5	0	2	2	12
1986–87	Hull Olympiques	QMJHL	69	44	58	102	126	8	6	7	13	8
1987–88	St. Louis Blues	NHL	1	0	0	0	0	—	—	—	—	—
1987–88	Peoria Rivermen	IHL	68	18	30	48	67	7	1	6	7	8
1988–89	Peoria Rivermen	IHL	73	17	37	54	83	4	0	1	1	2
1989–90	Charlottetown Islanders	NBSHL	11	7	12	19	10	—	—	—	—	—
1989–90	Swindon Wildcats	BD1	9	17	17	34	10	—	—	—	—	—
1990–91	Charlottetown Islanders	NBSHL	10	8	7	15	2	—	—	—	—	—
1992–93	SC Lyss	NLB	9	3	3	6	16	—	—	—	—	—
1992–93	Peterborough Pirates	BHL	29	33	44	77	48	—	—	—	—	—
1993–94	Eaters Geleen	NED	30	32	44	76	40	10	3	5	8	20
1994–95	Brantford Smoke	CoHL	71	30	52	82	58	—	—	—	—	—
IHL totals			141	35	67	102	150	11	1	7	8	10
NHL totals			1	0	0	0	0	—	—	—	—	—

== See also ==
- List of players who played only one game in the NHL
