= Gerry Fleming =

Canadian ice hockey player

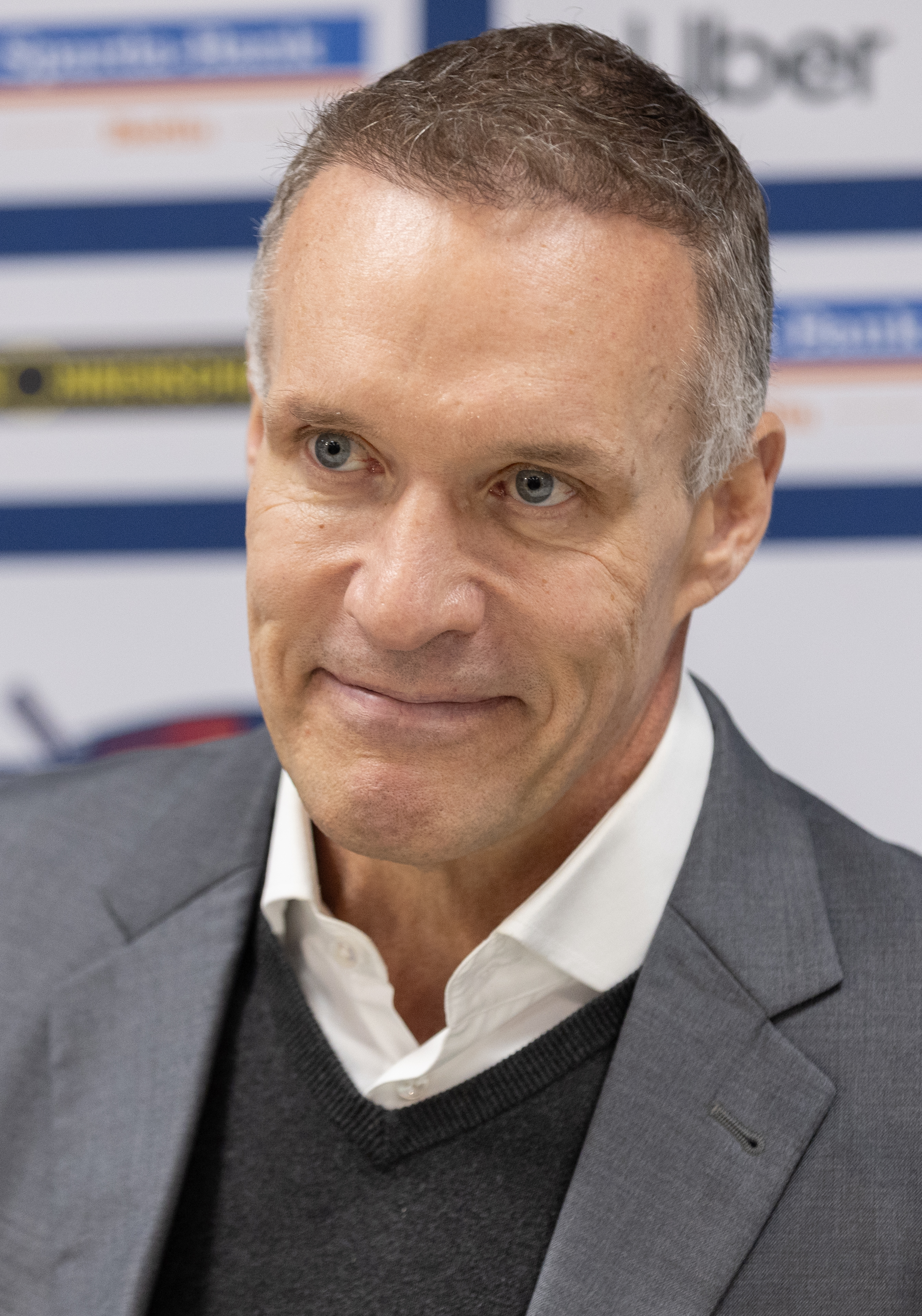
- Fleming in 2025
- Born: October 16, 1967 (age 58) Montreal, Quebec, Canada
- Height: 6 ft 5 in (196 cm)
- Weight: 240 lb (109 kg; 17 st 2 lb)
- Position: Left wing
- Shot: Left
- Played for: Montreal Canadiens
- NHL draft: Undrafted
- Playing career: 1991–1998

Gerald Alexander Fleming (born October 16, 1967) is a Canadian former professional ice hockey forward who played 11 games in the National Hockey League for the Montreal Canadiens during the 1993–94 and 1994–95 seasons. Fleming also played ice hockey for the University of Prince Edward Island Panthers and the Fredericton Canadiens in the American Hockey League during his career, which lasted from 1991 to 1998.

As of 2022, he served as the head coach of the ECHL's Iowa Heartlanders, the affiliate of the Minnesota Wild during the 2021-22 ECHL season. He was previously the interim coach of the Oklahoma City Barons. On July 21, 2015, he was named as the first head coach of the Bakersfield Condors in the AHL, a position he held until 2018.

He stepped down as the head coach of the Heartlanders in 2022. Since then he has coached in Europe.

== Career statistics ==
=== Regular season and playoffs ===
			Regular season					Playoffs
Season	Team	League	GP	G	A	Pts	PIM	GP	G	A	Pts	PIM
1983–84	Verdun Juniors	QMJHL	52	4	11	15	265	3	0	4	4	2
1984–85	Verdun Junior Canadiens	QMJHL	44	15	23	38	160	14	5	6	11	96
1984–85	Verdun Junior Canadiens	QMJHL	—	—	—	—	—	3	0	0	0	18
1985–86	Verdun Junior Canadiens	QMJHL	47	15	21	36	324	4	0	1	1	18
1986–87	University of Prince Edward Island	CIAU	20	19	11	30	73	—	—	—	—	—
1987–88	University of Prince Edward Island	CIAU	23	11	15	26	61	—	—	—	—	—
1988–89	University of Prince Edward Island	CIAU	17	11	23	34	61	—	—	—	—	—
1989–90	Fredericton Alpines	NBSHL	24	12	18	30	83	5	3	6	9	—
1990–91	University of Prince Edward Island	CIAU	9	2	6	8	41	—	—	—	—	—
1990–91	Charlottetown Islanders	NBSHL	—	—	—	—	—	—	—	—	—	—
1991–92	Fredericton Canadiens	AHL	37	4	6	10	133	1	0	0	0	7
1992–93	Fredericton Canadiens	AHL	64	9	17	26	262	5	1	2	3	14
1993–94	Montreal Canadiens	NHL	5	0	0	0	25	—	—	—	—	—
1993–94	Fredericton Canadiens	AHL	46	6	16	22	188	—	—	—	—	—
1994–95	Montreal Canadiens	NHL	6	0	0	0	17	—	—	—	—	—
1994–95	Fredericton Canadiens	AHL	16	3	3	6	60	10	2	0	2	67
1995–96	Fredericton Canadiens	AHL	40	8	9	17	127	10	3	1	4	19
1996–97	Fredericton Canadiens	AHL	40	5	11	16	164	—	—	—	—	—
1997–98	Fredericton Canadiens	AHL	28	3	3	6	101	1	0	0	0	0
AHL totals			271	38	65	103	1035	27	6	3	9	107
NHL totals			11	0	0	0	42	—	—	—	—	—
