= Marc Bureau (ice hockey) =

Canadian retired ice hockey centre

- Born: May 19, 1966 (age 59) Trois-Rivières, Quebec, Canada
- Height: 6 ft 1 in (185 cm)
- Weight: 202 lb (92 kg; 14 st 6 lb)
- Position: Centre
- Shot: Right
- Played for: Calgary Flames; Minnesota North Stars; Tampa Bay Lightning; Montreal Canadiens; Philadelphia Flyers
- NHL draft: Undrafted
- Playing career: 1987–2001

Marc Joseph Denis Bureau (born May 19, 1966) is a Canadian former ice hockey centre who played in the National Hockey League for the Calgary Flames, Minnesota North Stars, Tampa Bay Lightning, Montreal Canadiens and Philadelphia Flyers.

== Career ==
In his prime, Bureau was considered in the upper echelon of defensive centres in the NHL. Never drafted by an NHL team, he was signed as a free agent by the Calgary Flames after scoring 54 goals for the Longueuil Chevaliers in 1986–87. With Calgary's logjam at the centre position, Bureau was traded to Minnesota for a third round choice (Sandy McCarthy) in 1991. He was claimed by the newly formed Tampa Bay Lightning in the 1992 NHL Expansion Draft, where he would enjoy his most successful years in the NHL. In 1995 he was traded to the Montreal Canadiens for veteran forward Brian Bellows.

Bureau was injured in practice as a member of the AHL's Saint John Flames in October 2000 and did not play again.

Bureau was a frequent guest commentator on the V nightly sports show L'attaque à 5.

== Career statistics ==
=== Regular season and playoffs ===
			Regular season					Playoffs
Season	Team	League	GP	G	A	Pts	PIM	GP	G	A	Pts	PIM
1983–84	Chicoutimi Sagueneens	QMJHL	56	6	16	22	14	—	—	—	—	—
1984–85	Chicoutimi Sagueneens	QMJHL	41	30	25	55	15	—	—	—	—	—
1984–85	Granby Bisons	QMJHL	27	20	45	65	14	—	—	—	—	—
1985–86	Granby Bisons	QMJHL	19	6	17	23	36	—	—	—	—	—
1985–86	Chicoutimi Sagueneens	QMJHL	44	30	45	75	33	9	3	7	10	10
1986–87	Longueuil Chevaliers	QMJHL	66	54	58	112	68	20	17	20	37	12
1987–88	Salt Lake Golden Eagles	IHL	69	7	20	27	86	7	0	3	3	8
1988–89	Salt Lake Golden Eagles	IHL	76	28	36	64	119	14	7	5	12	31
1989–90	Calgary Flames	NHL	5	0	0	0	4	—	—	—	—	—
1989–90	Salt Lake Golden Eagles	IHL	67	43	48	91	173	11	4	8	12	45
1990–91	Calgary Flames	NHL	5	0	0	0	2	—	—	—	—	—
1990–91	Salt Lake Golden Eagles	IHL	54	40	48	88	101	—	—	—	—	—
1990–91	Minnesota North Stars	NHL	9	0	6	6	4	23	3	2	5	20
1991–92	Kalamazoo Wings	IHL	7	2	8	10	2	—	—	—	—	—
1991–92	Minnesota North Stars	NHL	46	6	4	10	50	5	0	0	0	14
1992–93	Tampa Bay Lightning	NHL	63	10	21	31	111	—	—	—	—	—
1993–94	Tampa Bay Lightning	NHL	75	8	7	15	30	—	—	—	—	—
1994–95	Tampa Bay Lightning	NHL	48	2	12	14	30	—	—	—	—	—
1995–96	Montreal Canadiens	NHL	65	3	7	10	46	6	1	1	2	4
1996–97	Montreal Canadiens	NHL	43	6	9	15	16	—	—	—	—	—
1997–98	Montreal Canadiens	NHL	74	13	6	19	12	10	1	2	3	6
1998–99	Philadelphia Flyers	NHL	71	4	6	10	10	6	0	2	2	2
1999–00	Philadelphia Flyers	NHL	54	2	2	4	10	—	—	—	—	—
1999–00	Calgary Flames	NHL	9	1	3	4	2	—	—	—	—	—
2000–01	Saint John Flames	AHL	17	4	7	11	13	—	—	—	—	—
NHL totals			567	55	83	138	327	50	5	7	12	46
