= Morgan Samuelsson =

Swedish ice hockey player and coach (1968–2023)

- Born: 6 April 1968 Boden, Sweden
- Died: 3 September 2023 (aged 55)
- Height: 180 cm (5 ft 11 in)
- Weight: 92 kg (203 lb; 14 st 7 lb)
- Position: Centre
- Shot: Left
- Played for: Luleå HF; Södertälje SK; AIK IF; Boden Hockey; Kassel Huskies; Kölner Haie; Lausitzer Füchse; ZSC Lions; SC Rapperswil-Jona Lakers; HC Thurgau; EK Zeller Eisbären; HC Davos
- Coached for: SC Rapperswil-Jona Lakers; HC Sierre; HC Bozen–Bolzano; Åkers IF
- NHL draft: 123rd overall, 1986; Quebec Nordiques
- Playing career: 1983–2002
- Coaching career: 2004–2011

Morgan Samuelsson (6 April 1968 – 3 September 2023) was a Swedish ice hockey player and coach who played as a centre. He was the brother of Magnus Samuelsson, a footballer.

== Playing career ==
Born in Boden on 6 April 1968, Samuelsson began playing ice hockey at a local athletic club, also participating in football, floorball, and bandy until the age of 15, when he began to focus solely on ice hockey. He played his first game in Hockeyettan in 1983. He then joined the Swedish Hockey League with Luleå HF, where he stayed for two seasons before joining AIK IF in the summer of 1992.

In 1996, Samuelsson joined the Deutsche Eishockey Liga, playing a season with the Kassel Huskies and the Kölner Haie. During the 1997–98 DEL season, he left Kölner and joined the Lausitzer Füchse. He left Germany in 1999 and joined HC Davos for the Spengler Cup. The following season, he played in 23 matches for HC Thurgau and returned to Davos for the Spengler Cup, which he won. He participated in the final games of the regular season, as well as the playoffs, with ZSC Lions, with whom he won the championship after scoring the decisive goal against Cristobal Huet. In the 2001–02 season, he was injured in the playoffs with SC Rapperswil-Jona Lakers and retired from playing.

Samuelsson had played in the 1986 IIHF European U18 Championship with Sweden, with whom he won a silver medal. That year, he entered into the 1986 NHL Draft, where he was selected 123rd overall in the 6th round by the Quebec Nordiques.

== Coaching career ==
In the 2004–05 Nationalliga A season, Samuelsson served as head coach for HC Sierre, which he left in 2006. He then became coach for HC Bozen–Bolzano, with whom he won the Coppa Italia in 2009, but he was fired the following season. He started the 2007–2008 season with Djurgårdens IF Hockey before replacing Kari Eloranta as coach of the SC Rapperswil-Jona Lakers, which he managed to qualify for the playoffs.

Samuelsson became coach of Åkers Hockey, which played in Hockeytvåan. He returned to HC Sierre for the 2008–09 season, where he replaced Bruno Aegerter for the remainder of the season. He was returned to HC Sierre again in 2010, this time to replace Bob Mongrain. He was fired on 9 November 2011.

== Death ==
Samuelsson died on 3 September 2023, at the age of 55.
