= Mario Doyon =

Canadian retired ice hockey defenceman

- Born: August 27, 1968 (age 57) Quebec City, Quebec, Canada
- Height: 6 ft 1 in (185 cm)
- Weight: 200 lb (91 kg; 14 st 4 lb)
- Position: Defence
- Shot: Right
- Played for: Chicago Blackhawks; Quebec Nordiques; HC Bolzano; SCL Tigers; Kölner Haie; Krefeld Pinguine
- NHL draft: 119th overall, 1986; Chicago Blackhawks
- Playing career: 1988–2005

Mario Doyon (born August 27, 1968) is a Canadian retired ice hockey defenceman. He played 28 games in the National Hockey League with the Chicago Blackhawks and Quebec Nordiques between 1989 and 1991. The rest of his career, which lasted from 1988 to 2005, was spent in the minor leagues and in several European leagues.

== Early life ==
Doyon was born in Quebec City, Quebec. As a youth, he played in the 1980 and 1981 Quebec International Pee-Wee Hockey Tournaments with a minor ice hockey team from Charlesbourg, Quebec City. He later played in the National Hockey League for the Chicago Blackhawks and Quebec Nordiques.

== Achievements and awards ==
- 1998 Promotion to the Nationalliga A with SC Langnau
- 1999 Spengler-Cup-winning with the Cologne Sharks
- 2003 German champion with the Krefeld Penguins

== Career statistics ==
=== Regular season and playoffs ===
			Regular season					Playoffs
Season	Team	League	GP	G	A	Pts	PIM	GP	G	A	Pts	PIM
1983–84	Sainte-Foy Gouverneurs	QMAAA	2	0	0	0	0	—	—	—	—	—
1984–85	Sainte-Foy Gouverneurs	QMAAA	42	14	17	31	82	—	—	—	—	—
1985–86	Drummondville Voltigeurs	QMJHL	71	5	14	19	129	23	5	4	9	32
1986–87	Drummondville Voltigeurs	QMJHL	65	18	47	65	150	8	1	3	4	30
1987–88	Drummondville Voltigeurs	QMJHL	68	23	54	77	233	17	3	14	17	46
1987–88	Drummondville Voltigeurs	M-Cup	—	—	—	—	—	3	0	1	1	2
1988–89	Chicago Blackhawks	NHL	7	1	1	2	6	—	—	—	—	—
1988–89	Saginaw Hawks	IHL	71	16	32	48	69	6	0	0	0	8
1989–90	Quebec Nordiques	NHL	9	2	3	5	6	—	—	—	—	—
1989–90	Indianapolis Ice	IHL	66	9	25	34	50	—	—	—	—	—
1989–90	Halifax Citadels	AHL	5	1	2	3	0	6	1	3	4	2
1990–91	Quebec Nordiques	NHL	12	0	0	0	4	—	—	—	—	—
1990–91	Halifax Citadels	AHL	59	14	23	37	58	—	—	—	—	—
1991–92	Halifax Citadels	AHL	9	0	0	0	22	—	—	—	—	—
1991–92	New Haven Nighthawks	AHL	64	11	29	40	44	5	1	1	2	2
1992–93	Halifax Citadels	AHL	79	5	31	36	73	—	—	—	—	—
1993–94	Fredericton Canadiens	AHL	56	12	21	33	44	—	—	—	—	—
1993–94	Kansas City Blades	IHL	5	0	3	3	0	—	—	—	—	—
1994–95	HC Bolzano	ITA	34	5	23	28	65	11	8	7	15	26
1995–96	San Francisco Spiders	IHL	74	13	23	36	61	4	1	3	4	0
1996–97	SC Langnau	NLB	42	20	28	48	88	8	4	1	5	12
1997–98	SC Langnau	NLB	27	10	20	30	75	16	7	14	21	26
1998–99	SC Langnau	NLA	44	14	26	40	74	—	—	—	—	—
1999–00	Kölner Haie	DEL	45	9	18	27	30	10	0	6	6	8
2000–01	Kölner Haie	DEL	50	8	12	20	90	3	1	0	1	2
2001–02	Krefeld Pinguine	DEL	48	11	26	37	40	3	0	0	0	14
2002–03	Krefeld Pinguine	DEL	42	7	16	23	84	11	0	5	5	16
2003–04	Indianapolis Ice	CHL	63	23	31	54	51	5	0	2	2	4
2004–05	Corpus Christi Rayz	CHL	1	0	0	0	0	—	—	—	—	—
AHL totals			272	43	106	149	241	11	2	4	6	4
NHL totals			28	3	4	7	16	—	—	—	—	—
