= Todd Hawkins =

Canadian ice hockey player

- Born: August 2, 1966 (age 58); Kingston, Ontario, Canada
- Height: 6 ft 1 in (185 cm)
- Weight: 195 lb (88 kg; 13 st 13 lb)
- Shot: Right
- Played for: Vancouver Canucks; Toronto Maple Leafs
- NHL draft: 217th overall, 1986; Vancouver Canucks
- Playing career: 1984–2003

Todd D. Hawkins (born August 2, 1966) is a Canadian former professional ice hockey player who played ten games in the National Hockey League between 1988 and 1991; eight with the Vancouver Canucks and two with the Toronto Maple Leafs.

== Career statistics ==
			Regular season					Playoffs
Season	Team	League	GP	G	A	Pts	PIM	GP	G	A	Pts	PIM
1983–84	Pembroke Lumber Kings	CJHL	53	28	22	50	117	—	—	—	—	—
1984–85	Belleville Bulls	OHL	58	7	16	23	117	12	1	0	1	10
1985–86	Belleville Bulls	OHL	60	14	13	27	172	24	9	7	16	60
1986–87	Belleville Bulls	OHL	60	47	40	87	187	6	3	5	8	16
1987–88	Flint Spirits	IHL	50	13	13	26	337	16	3	5	8	174
1987–88	Fredericton Express	AHL	2	0	0	0	11	—	—	—	—	—
1988–89	Milwaukee Admirals	IHL	63	12	14	26	307	9	0	1	1	33
1988–89	Vancouver Canucks	NHL	4	0	0	0	9	—	—	—	—	—
1989–90	Milwaukee Admirals	IHL	61	23	17	40	273	5	4	1	5	19
1989–90	Vancouver Canucks	NHL	4	0	0	0	6	—	—	—	—	—
1990–91	Milwaukee Admirals	IHL	39	9	11	20	134	—	—	—	—	—
1990–91	Newmarket Saints	AHL	22	2	5	7	66	—	—	—	—	—
1991–92	St. John's Maple Leafs	NHL	66	30	27	57	139	7	1	0	1	10
1991–92	Toronto Maple Leafs	NHL	2	0	0	0	0	—	—	—	—	—
1992–93	St. John's Maple Leafs	AHL	72	21	41	62	103	9	1	3	4	10
1993–94	Cleveland Lumberjacks	IHL	76	19	14	33	115	—	—	—	—	—
1994–95	Cleveland Lumberjacks	IHL	4	2	0	2	29	—	—	—	—	—
1994–95	Minnesota Moose	IHL	47	10	8	18	95	3	0	1	1	12
1995–96	Cincinnati Cyclones	IHL	73	16	12	28	65	17	7	4	11	32
1996–97	Cincinnati Cyclones	IHL	81	13	13	26	162	3	0	1	1	12
1997–98	Cincinnati Cyclones	IHL	61	13	23	36	168	9	0	3	3	36
1998–99	Cincinnati Cyclones	IHL	82	20	32	52	171	3	2	1	3	8
1999–00	Cincinnati Cyclones	IHL	61	14	17	31	98	1	1	0	1	0
2001–02	Moskitos Essen	DEL	49	18	14	32	146	—	—	—	—	—
2002–03	Hannover Scorpions	DEL	43	7	22	29	138	—	—	—	—	—
IHL totals			708	164	174	338	1954	66	17	17	34	316
NHL totals			10	0	0	0	15	—	—	—	—	—
