= Denis Chassé =

Canadian ice hockey player

- Born: February 7, 1970 (age 56) Montreal, Quebec, Canada
- Height: 6 ft 2 in (188 cm)
- Weight: 190 lb (86 kg; 13 st 8 lb)
- Position: Right wing
- Shot: Right
- Played for: St. Louis Blues; Washington Capitals; Winnipeg Jets; Ottawa Senators
- NHL draft: Undrafted
- Playing career: 1991–2001

Denis Chassé (born February 7, 1970) is a Canadian former professional ice hockey player. He played in the NHL for the St. Louis Blues, Washington Capitals, Winnipeg Jets and Ottawa Senators. He played right wing and shot right-handed.

== Playing career ==
As a youth, Chassé played in the 1983 Quebec International Pee-Wee Hockey Tournament with a minor ice hockey team from Mercier, Quebec.

Chassé began his career playing in the QMJHL. While there he established himself as a high scoring forward as well as a rugged enforcer. In his final year in the QMJHL he scored 101 points in 62 games in addition to logging 246 penalty minutes.

Chassé signed as a free agent with the Quebec Nordiques in 1991. From there he reported to the Halifax Citadels of the AHL. He played two solid years with the Citadels, scoring 61 and 76 points. For the 1993–1994 season Chassé joined the Cornwall Aces and scored 66 points in 48 games. Midway through the 1993–1994 season he was traded to the St. Louis Blues and made his NHL debut with the Blues towards the end of the season, appearing in three games.

Chassé earned a full-time spot with the Blues for the 1994–1995 lockout shortened season. He played in 47 games, scoring 16 points. He also surprised many with his play in the playoffs that year, scoring eight points in seven games. The 1995–1996 season was a rough one for Chassé. He played for three teams, playing 42 games with the Blues, three with the Washington Capitals, and 15 with the Winnipeg Jets while only scoring three points the whole year.

Chassé signed as a free agent with the Ottawa Senators for the 1996–1997 season. He played 22 games in what would be his last stint in the NHL. Chassé then played the next four years in Europe, beginning with a season in the Deutsche Eishockey Liga in Germany, splitting the season with the Adler Mannheim and the Augsburger Panther. He then spent three seasons in the United Kingdom playing in the now defunct Ice Hockey Superleague, spending two seasons with the Bracknell Bees and one with the Cardiff Devils before retiring in 2001.

== Personal life ==
Denis Chassé is married to Carolee (Doyle) Chassé. Together, they have three children. Dayne Chassé (1999–present), Anika Chassé (2001–present), and Blake Chassé (2002–present). He is now working in Halifax, Nova Scotia, Canada for Allstate insurance.

== Career statistics ==
			Regular season					Playoffs
Season	Team	League	GP	G	A	Pts	PIM	GP	G	A	Pts	PIM
1987–88	Saint-Jean Castors	QMJHL	13	0	1	1	2	1	0	0	0	0
1988–89	Verdun Junior Canadiens	QMJHL	38	12	12	24	61	—	—	—	—	—
1988–89	Drummondville Voltigeurs	QMJHL	29	15	14	29	79	3	0	2	2	28
1989–90	Chicoutimi Saguenéens	QMJHL	67	33	56	89	190	7	7	4	11	60
1990–91	Drummondville Voltigeurs	QMJHL	62	47	54	101	246	13	9	11	20	56
1991–92	Halifax Citadels	AHL	73	26	35	61	254	—	—	—	—	—
1992–93	Halifax Citadels	AHL	75	35	41	76	242	—	—	—	—	—
1993–94	St. Louis Blues	NHL	3	0	1	1	15	—	—	—	—	—
1993–94	Cornwall Aces	AHL	48	27	39	66	194	—	—	—	—	—
1994–95	St. Louis Blues	NHL	47	7	9	16	133	7	1	7	8	23
1995–96	St. Louis Blues	NHL	42	3	0	3	108	—	—	—	—	—
1995–96	Worcester IceCats	AHL	3	0	0	0	6	—	—	—	—	—
1995–96	Washington Capitals	NHL	3	0	0	0	5	—	—	—	—	—
1995–96	Winnipeg Jets	NHL	15	0	0	0	12	—	—	—	—	—
1996–97	Ottawa Senators	NHL	22	1	4	5	19	—	—	—	—	—
1996–97	Detroit Vipers	IHL	9	2	1	3	33	—	—	—	—	—
1996–97	Indianapolis Ice	IHL	3	0	0	0	10	4	1	1	2	23
1997–98	Adler Mannheim	DEL	15	2	5	7	72	—	—	—	—	—
1997–98	Augsburger Panther	DEL	29	6	6	12	97	—	—	—	—	—
1998–99	Bracknell Bees	BISL	33	13	22	35	108	—	—	—	—	—
1999–00	Bracknell Bees	BISL	38	18	25	43	100	4	1	3	4	34
2000–01	Cardiff Devils	BISL	36	10	13	23	60	—	—	—	—	—
NHL totals			132	11	14	25	292	7	1	7	8	23

Source: Internet Hockey Database
