= Esa Palosaari =

Finnish ice hockey player

Esa Palosaari is a retired Finnish ice hockey player. He was selected 50th overall by the Winnipeg Jets in the 1986 NHL entry draft. He played mainly for Kärpät Oulu in Finland and the Bracknell Bees in the United Kingdom.
