= Verdun Junior Canadiens =

Canadian junior ice hockey team (1982–1989)

- City: Montreal, Quebec
- League: QMJHL
- Operated: 1984 to 1989
- Home arena: Verdun Auditorium
- Colours: red, white and blue

Franchise history
- 1933–1972: Montreal Junior Canadiens
- 1972–1975: Montreal Bleu Blanc Rouge
- 1975–1982: Montreal Juniors
- 1982–1984: Verdun Juniors
- 1984–1989: Verdun Junior Canadiens
- 1989–1996: Saint-Hyacinthe Laser
- 1996–present: Rouyn-Noranda Huskies

The Verdun Junior Canadiens were a Canadian junior ice hockey team in the Quebec Major Junior Hockey League (QMJHL) from 1984 to 1989. They played home games at the Verdun Auditorium, and won the President's Cup during the 1984–85 QMJHL season.

== History ==
=== Verdun Juniors ===
The Verdun Juniors were assembled by general manager Eric Taylor, and coached by Pierre Creamer. Verdun won the Presidents Trophy in the 1982–83 season as playoff champions, defeating the Trois-Rivières Draveurs, Shawinigan Cataractes and the Longueuil Chevaliers.

The Juniors would compete in the Memorial Cup that year versus the Lethbridge Broncos, Portland Winter Hawks and the Oshawa Generals. Verdun would lose 7–6 to Portland, defeat Lethbridge 4–3, lose 5–1 to Oshawa, and lose 6–5 to Oshawa in the semi-final game, ending their hopes of a Memorial Cup championship.

After two very successful seasons, the team revived its old name to become the Verdun Jr. Canadiens.

=== Verdun Junior Canadiens ===
Yvon Lambert was named the team's head coach for the 1984–85 QMJHL season. He resigned on March 8, 1985, with five games remaining, because he said "it was too difficult for him to motivate amateur-level players". Jean Bégin was named head coach for the final five games of the season and the playoffs. The team that season included future NHL players Claude Lemieux, Jimmy Carson, Gerry Fleming, Shane MacEachern, and Everett Sanipass.

Bégin led Verdun to three wins in the remainder of the regular season, and a first-place finish in the Lebel Division. In the playoffs, Verdun defeated the Hull Olympiques four games to one in the first round, then defeated the Shawinigan Cataractes four games to one in the second round, and defeated the Chicoutimi Saguenéens in four consecutive games to win the President's Cup. Claude Lemieux led the league in playoffs scoring 23 goals, and 40 points. Verdun's games in the 1985 Memorial Cup were played in Drummondville, Quebec. Verdun lost 6-3 to the Sault Ste. Marie Greyhounds in game one, lost 5-3 to the Prince Albert Raiders in game two, and lost 5-1 to the Shawinigan Cataractes in game three.

Two seasons later the Junior Canadiens began three consecutive seasons placing last in the QMJHL. The team was sold after the 1988–89 season, becoming the Saint-Hyacinthe Laser.

== Players ==
Pat LaFontaine scored 104 goals and 130 assists for 234 points in the 1982–83 season, his only season in major junior hockey, winning the Jean Béliveau Trophy as the top scorer, out-dueling future NHL icon Mario Lemieux. Two of the more prominent records he broke were Guy Lafleur's 40-game point-scoring streak and Mike Bossy's 70 goals by a rookie.

He was awarded the Michel Brière Commemorative Trophy as the MVP of the regular season, the Guy Lafleur Trophy as the MVP of the playoffs, the Michel Bergeron Trophy as the Offensive Rookie of the Year, the Mike Bossy Trophy as the best professional prospect, and the Frank J. Selke Commemorative Trophy as the Most sportsmanlike player. Also in 1982–1983 Pat LaFontaine was chosen Canadian Hockey League Player of the Year. Pat would be inducted into the Hockey Hall of Fame in 2003.

Also of note, is alumnus Claude Lemieux, who would play almost 1200 NHL games. He scored 379 goals, and won 4 Stanley Cups in 1986 (Montreal), 1995 (New Jersey), 1996 (Colorado) & 2000 (New Jersey).

Billy Campbell was awarded the Emile Bouchard Trophy as the Defenceman of the year in the 1983–84 season. Jérôme Carrier was awarded the Frank J. Selke Commemorative Trophy as the Most sportsmanlike player in 1983–1984.

Claude Lemieux was awarded the Guy Lafleur Trophy as the most valuable player in the 1985 playoffs. Jimmy Carson won two awards during the 1984–85 season. He won the Michel Bergeron Trophy as the offensive rookie-of-the-year, and the Michael Bossy Trophy as the best professional prospect. Carson won the Frank J. Selke Memorial Trophy as most sportsmanlike player during the 1985–86 season.

NHL alumni

- Jean-Claude Bergeron
- Jimmy Carson
- Eric Charron
- Denis Chasse
- Gerry Fleming
- Gerard Gallant
- Pat LaFontaine
- Claude Lemieux
- Shane MacEachern
- Daniel Marois
- Andrew McKim
- Vincent Riendeau
- Everett Sanipass
- Pierre Sevigny
- Martin St. Amour

== Yearly results ==
Regular season and playoffs results:

=== Regular season ===
Season	Games	Won	Lost	Tied	Points	Pct %	Goals for	Goals against	Standing
1982-83	70	50	19	1	101	0.721	486	303	2nd Lebel
1983-84	70	40	27	3	83	0.593	359	309	2nd Lebel
1984–85	68	36	30	2	77	0.544	366	319	1st in Lebel
1985–86	72	38	31	3	79	0.549	358	364	2nd in Lebel
1986–87	70	14	55	1	29	0.207	299	520	5th in Lebel
1987–88	70	19	47	4	42	0.300	285	428	5th in Lebel
1988–89	70	12	56	2	26	0.186	231	387	11th in QMJHL

=== Playoffs ===
- 1982-83 Defeated Trois-Rivières Draveurs 4 games to 0 in quarter-finals.
  Defeated Shawinigan Cataractes 4 games to 2 in semi-finals.
  Defeated Longueuil Chevaliers 4 games to 1 in finals. QMJHL CHAMPIONS
  Lost to Oshawa Generals 6–5 in the semi-final game of the Memorial Cup.
- 1983-84 Defeated St.-Jean Castors 4 games to 0 in quarter-finals.
  Lost to Longueuil Chevaliers 4 games to 2 in semi-finals.
- 1984–85 Defeated Hull Olympiques 4 games to 1 in quarter-finals.
  Defeated Shawinigan Cataractes 4 games to 1 in semi-finals.
  Defeated Chicoutimi Saguenéens 4 games to 0 in finals. QMJHL CHAMPIONS
  Finished winless at 1985 Memorial Cup tournament.
- 1985–86 Lost to Saint-Jean Castors 5 games to 0 in quarter-finals.
- 1986–87 Out of playoffs.
- 1987–88 Out of playoffs.
- 1988–89 Out of playoffs.
