= Pulosari =

Pulosari may refer to:

- Pulosari, West Java, a village in Sukabumi regency, West Java
- Pulosari (volcano), at the western end of Java
