= Martin Desjardins (ice hockey) =

Canadian ice hockey player

- Born: January 28, 1967 (age 58); Sainte-Rose, Quebec, Canada
- Height: 6 ft 0 in (183 cm)
- Weight: 180 lb (82 kg; 12 st 12 lb)
- Position: Centre
- Shot: Left
- Played for: Montreal Canadiens; Lausanne HC; Genève-Servette HC; Berlin Capitals
- NHL draft: 75th overall, 1985; Montreal Canadiens
- Playing career: 1987–1998

Martin Ronald Desjardins (born January 28, 1967) is a Canadian former professional ice hockey forward. He played eight games in the National Hockey League (NHL) for the Montreal Canadiens during the 1989–90 season. The rest of his career, which lasted from 1987 to 1998, was spent in the minor leagues and in Europe.

== Career statistics ==
=== Regular season and playoffs ===
			Regular season					Playoffs
Season	Team	League	GP	G	A	Pts	PIM	GP	G	A	Pts	PIM
1982–83	Laurentides-Lanaudière Pionniers	QMAAA	45	25	29	54	48	14	6	12	18	22
1983–84	Laurentides-Lanaudière Pionniers	QMAAA	38	38	43	81	72	6	4	2	6	16
1984–85	Trois-Rivières Draveurs	QMJHL	66	29	34	63	79	7	4	6	10	6
1985–86	Trois-Rivières Draveurs	QMJHL	71	49	69	118	105	4	2	4	6	4
1986–87	Trois-Rivières Draveurs	QMJHL	52	32	52	84	77	—	—	—	—	—
1986–87	Longueuil Chevaliers	QMJHL	16	7	9	16	12	19	8	10	18	18
1986–87	Longueuil Chevaliers	M-Cup	—	—	—	—	—	5	0	1	1	4
1987–88	Sherbrooke Canadiens	AHL	75	34	36	70	117	5	1	1	2	8
1988–89	Sherbrooke Canadiens	AHL	70	17	27	44	104	6	2	7	9	21
1989–90	Montreal Canadiens	NHL	8	0	2	2	2	—	—	—	—	—
1989–90	Sherbrooke Canadiens	AHL	65	21	26	47	72	12	4	13	17	28
1990–91	Fredericton Canadiens	AHL	2	0	1	1	6	—	—	—	—	—
1990–91	Indianapolis Ice	IHL	71	15	42	57	110	7	2	1	3	8
1991–92	Indianapolis Ice	IHL	36	4	7	11	52	—	—	—	—	—
1992–93	Lausanne HC	NLB	29	22	14	36	56	—	—	—	—	—
1993–94	Lausanne HC	NLB	25	23	15	38	38	13	8	5	13	30
1994–95	Lausanne HC	NLB	36	19	30	49	52	11	4	9	13	14
1995–96	Lausanne HC	NLA	33	5	11	16	68	—	—	—	—	—
1996–97	Genève-Servette HC	NLB	41	23	22	45	114	—	—	—	—	—
1997–98	Berlin Capitals	DEL	31	8	13	21	24	3	0	0	0	0
AHL totals			212	72	90	162	299	23	7	21	28	57
NHL totals			8	0	2	2	2	—	—	—	—	—
