= Longueuil Chevaliers =

- City: Longueuil, Quebec
- League: Q.M.J.H.L.
- Operated: 1982 to 1987
- Home arena: Colisée Jean Béliveau

Franchise history
- 1982–1987: Longueuil Chevaliers
- 1987–Present: Victoriaville Tigres

The Longueuil Chevaliers ("Cavaliers") were a junior ice hockey team in the Quebec Major Junior Hockey League, playing in Longueuil, Quebec, Canada at Colisée Jean Béliveau. They were founded in 1982 and set a Canadian Hockey League record for the most successful season ever by an expansion franchise, going 37-29-4 under the coaching of Jacques Lemaire. Longueuil reached the league finals for the President's Cup in both of their first two seasons. The Chevaliers finished runners-up both times losing to greater Montreal rival teams, the Verdun Juniors in 1983, and the Laval Voisins in 1984.

Longueuil failed to qualify for the playoffs in their next two seasons, but in returned to the playoffs in 1987 coached by Guy Chouinard. The team started the season with Guy Lapointe as general manager, who was promoted to assistant coach with the Quebec Nordiques mid-season. Lapointe was then replaced with Michel Larocque. The Chevaliers survived the round-robin to start the post-season, then faced the Laval Titan in the division finals. Laval won the first three games then Longueuil came back, winning four consecutive games and the series. Returning to the league finals, the Chevaliers defeated the Chicoutimi Saguenéens. The Chevaliers travelled to Oshawa, Ontario to compete in the 1987 Memorial Cup versus the host Oshawa Generals and the Medicine Hat Tigers, finishing in third place.

However, low attendance doomed the team to failure and they moved to Victoriaville in 1987, becoming the Victoriaville Tigres. The team was owned by Gilles Lupien.

== NHL alumni ==
Ten alumni who played for Longueuil in the QMJHL also played in the NHL.

- Marc Bureau
- J. J. Daigneault
- Martin Desjardins
- Donald Dufresne
- Daniel Gauthier
- Luc Gauthier
- Andre Racicot
- Yves Racine
- Daniel Shank
- Ronnie Stern
