= 1985 Memorial Cup =

Canadian junior men's ice hockey championship

Tournament details
- Venues: Shawinigan Municipal Auditorium Shawinigan, Quebec (initial venue); Centre Civique Drummondville, Quebec (replacement venue)
- Dates: May 11–18, 1985
- Teams: 4
- Host team: Shawinigan Cataractes (QMJHL)

Final positions
- Champions: Prince Albert Raiders (WHL) (1st title)

Tournament statistics
- Games played: 8

The Memorial Cup trophy

The 1985 Memorial Cup took place on May 11–18 at the Shawinigan Municipal Auditorium in Shawinigan, Quebec and at Centre Civique in Drummondville, Quebec. It was the 67th annual Memorial Cup competition and determined the major junior ice hockey champion of the Canadian Hockey League (CHL). The tournament was originally only to be played in Shawinigan, but support columns in the seats of the ancient Auditorium made televising the games impossible and the tournament was moved to Drummondville after the second game. Participating teams were the host team Shawinigan Cataractes, as well as the winners of the Quebec Major Junior Hockey League, Ontario Hockey League and Western Hockey League which were the Verdun Junior Canadiens, Sault Ste. Marie Greyhounds and Prince Albert Raiders. Prince Albert won their first Memorial Cup, defeating Shawinigan in the final game.

== Teams ==
QMJHL Team OHL Team WHL Team Host Team Host City

=== Prince Albert Raiders ===
The Prince Albert Raiders represented the Western Hockey League at the 1985 Memorial Cup. The Raiders were the top team in the WHL during the 1984–85 season, as they had a record of 58-11-3, earning 119 points. Prince Albert was awarded the Scotty Munro Memorial Trophy for their achievement during the regular season. The Raiders had the highest scoring offense in the league, scoring 455 goals. Defensively, Prince Albert allowed the second fewest goals against, as they allowed 255 goals. In the East Division semi-finals, the Raiders swept the Calgary Wranglers in four games. In the East Division finals, Prince Albert had little trouble, as they defeated the Medicine Hat Tigers four games to one, advancing to the President's Cup. In the championship round, the Raiders swept the Kamloops Blazers in four games to win the Cup and earn a berth into the 1985 Memorial Cup.

The Raiders high powered offense was led by Dan Hodgson, who led the club with 70 goals and 182 points in 64 games. Hodgson ranked second in overall league scoring during the regular season. In the playoffs, Hodgson continued to lead Prince Albert, as he scored 10 goals and 36 points in 13 games. Tony Grenier scored 62 goals and 120 points in 71 games, while Dave Pasin scored 64 goals and 116 points in 65 games, giving the Raiders three players with 60+ goals. Ken Morrison scored 51 goals and 108 points in 64 games, as Prince Albert had four 100+ point players. On defense, Emanuel Viveiros scored 17 goals and 88 points in 68 games to lead the club. Dave Manson scored eight goals and 38 points in 72 games, while accumulating 247 penalty minutes. He was a top prospect for the upcoming 1985 NHL entry draft. Goaltending duties were split between Ward Komonoksy, who earned a 30-7-1 record with a 3.52 GAA and a .883 save percentage in 38 games, and Roydon Gunn, who was 28-4-2 with a 3.42 GAA and .881 save percentage in 36 games.

The 1985 Memorial Cup was the Raiders first appearance at the tournament in team history.

=== Sault Ste. Marie Greyhounds ===
The Sault Ste. Marie Greyhounds represented the Ontario Hockey League at the 1985 Memorial Cup. The Greyhounds were the top regular season club in the OHL during the 1984–85 season, earning a record of 54-11-1 for 109 points. The Greyhounds were a perfect 33-0-0 at home during the season and won the Hamilton Spectator Trophy as the top team. Sault Ste. Marie scored 384 goals, which ranked second in the league, while the club allowed a league-low 215 goals against. In the post-season, the Greyhounds swept the Kitchener Rangers in the Emms Division quarter-finals in four games. The club earned a bye to the Emms Division finals, in which they faced the Hamilton Steelhawks. Sault Ste. Marie defeated Hamilton four games to zero, with one game ending in a tie, to advance to the J. Ross Robertson Cup finals. In the final round, the Greyhounds faced the Peterborough Petes. Sault Ste. Marie defeated the Petes four games to two, with a tie, to win the OHL Championship and earn a berth in the 1985 Memorial Cup.

The Greyhounds offense was led by Wayne Groulx, who scored 59 goals and a team high 144 points in 64 games. Groulx finished second in OHL scoring during the regular season. In 16 playoff games, Groulx scored 18 goals and 36 points to lead the club. Graeme Bonar scored a team high 66 goals, while earning 137 points in 66 games, finishing fourth in OHL scoring. Derek King emerged as a top prospect for the 1985 NHL entry draft after scoring 35 goals and 73 points in 63 games during his rookie season. King was awarded the Emms Family Award as OHL Rookie of the Year. Bob Probert scored 20 goals and 72 points, as well as accumulating 172 penalty minutes in 44 games with the Greyhounds following a mid-season trade with the Hamilton Steelhawks. On defense, Chris Felix led the club, as he scored 29 goals and 101 points in 63 games. Jeff Beukeboom and Ken Sabourin provided solid stay-at-home defense for the Greyhounds. In goal, Marty Abrams saw the majority of action, earning a 3.38 GAA in 39 games. His backup was Scott Mosey, who posted a 2.66 GAA in 22 games. Abrams and Mosey won the Dave Pinkney Trophy, awarded to the goaltenders with the fewest goals against in the OHL.

The 1985 Memorial Cup was the first appearance by the Greyhounds in club history.

=== Shawinigan Cataractes ===
The Shawinigan Cataractes of the Quebec Major Junior Hockey League was the host team at the 1985 Memorial Cup. The Cataractes were the best regular season club in the QMJHL during the 1984–85 season, finishing 48-18-1-1 to earn 98 points. The club was awarded the Jean Rougeau Trophy for being the top club during the regular season. Shawinigan scored a league high 384 goals, while the club also led the league by allowing the fewest goals at 255. In the QMJHL quarter-finals, the Cataractes swept the Quebec Remparts in four games. In the semi-finals, Shawinigan ran into the Verdun Junior Canadiens, who upset the Cataractes by winning the series in five games.

The Cataractes high-powered offense was led by Marc Damphousse, who led the team with 65 goals and 160 points in 68 games, finishing second in overall league scoring. Damphousse led Shawinigan in post-season scoring, as he had five goals and 16 points in eight games. Sergio Momesso scored 56 goals and 146 points in 64 games, finishing fourth in league scoring. Mario Belanger scored 44 goals and 113 points in 55 games, as the Cataractes had three players with 100+ points on their roster during the season. On defense, Yves Beaudoin scored 20 goals and 58 points in 58 games. Beaudoin won the Emile Bouchard Trophy as QMJHL Defenseman of the Year. In goal, duties were split between Robert Desjardins and Marc Desbiens. Desjardins earned a record of 24-12-1 with a 3.43 GAA in 42 games, winning the Raymond Lagace Trophy as Defensive Rookie in the QMJHL. Desbiens had a record of 23-7-0 with a 3.71 GAA in 38 games.

The 1985 Memorial Cup was the first time in club history that the Cataractes participated in the event.

=== Verdun Junior Canadiens ===
The Verdun Junior Canadiens represented the Quebec Major Junior Hockey League at the 1985 Memorial Cup. The Junior Canadiens were coached by Jean Bégin and were the top team in the Lebel Division, as they posted a record of 36-27-2-3, earning 77 points. During the regular season, the club scored 366 goals, ranking them third in the QMJHL. Verdun allowed 319 goals against, ranking them fourth in the league. In the QMJHL quarter-finals, the Junior Canadiens defeated the Hull Olympiques in five games. In the semi-finals, Verdun upset the heavily favoured Shawinigan Cataractes in five games, advancing to the President's Cup. In the final round, Verdun swept the Chicoutimi Sagueneens in four games to win the QMJHL championship and earn a berth into the 1985 Memorial Cup.

The Junior Canadiens offense was led by Claude Lemieux, who returned to Verdun after beginning his season in the NHL with the Montreal Canadiens. In 52 games, Lemieux scored 58 goals and 124 points to lead the club in scoring. In 14 playoff games, Lemieux scored 23 goals and 40 points, winning the Guy Lafleur Trophy as QMJHL Playoff MVP. Jimmy Carson scored 44 goals and 116 points in 68 games as a rookie, emerging as a top prospect for the 1986 NHL entry draft. Carson was awarded the Michel Bergeron Trophy as QMJHL Offensive Rookie of the Year. Jean Bourgeois scored 50 goals and 93 points in 63 games during the regular season. On defense, Ron Annear led the team, as he scored five goals and 51 points in 62 games, while Jerome Carrier scored seven goals and 39 points in 65 games. In goal, Troy Crosby emerged as the starting goaltender for Verdun, as he appeared in 42 games, earning a record of 21-15-2 with a 4.53 GAA.

The 1985 Memorial Cup was the second time in team history that Verdun was at the Memorial Cup. At the 1983 Memorial Cup as the Verdun Juniors, the club lost in the semi-finals to the Oshawa Generals.

== Round-robin standings ==
Pos	Team	Pld	W	L	GF	GA	
1	Shawinigan Cataractes (QMJHL Host)	3	2	1	14	7	Advanced directly to the championship game
2	Prince Albert Raiders (WHL)	3	2	1	15	15	Advanced to the semifinal game
3	Sault Ste. Marie Greyhounds (OHL)	3	2	1	16	14	Advanced to the semifinal game
4	Verdun Junior Canadiens (QMJHL)	3	0	3	7	16	

== Scores ==
Round-robin

- May 11 Sault Ste. Marie 4-3 Shawinigan
- May 12 Shawinigan 6-2 Prince Albert
- May 12 Sault Ste. Marie 6-3 Verdun
- May 13 Prince Albert 5-3 Verdun
- May 14 Prince Albert 8-6 Sault Ste. Marie
- May 15 Shawinigan 5-1 Verdun

Semi-final

- May 16 Prince Albert 8-3 Sault Ste. Marie

Final

- May 18 Prince Albert 6-1 Shawinigan

=== Winning roster ===
1984-85 Prince Albert Raiders
Goaltenders: 1 – Roydon Gunn; 30 – Ward Komonosky	Defencemen: 2 – Curtis Hunt; 3 – Emanuel Viveiros; 4 – Dave Manson; 5 – Dave Goertz; 6 – Doug Hobson - C; 20 – Neil Davey; 21 – Don Schmidt	Wingers: 8 – Ken Morrison; 14 – Dean Braham; 15 – Kim Issel; 17 – Pat Elynuik; 18 – Rod Dallman; 22 – Ken Baumgartner; 23 – Dale McFee; 24 – Brad Bennett; 25 – Kurt Woolf	Centres: 7 – Steve Gotaas; 9 – Tony Grenier; 10 – Collin Feser; 12 – Dave Pasin; 16 – Dan Hodgson - C; Coach: Terry Simpson; General Manager: Terry Simpson

== Award winners ==
- Stafford Smythe Memorial Trophy (MVP): Dan Hodgson, Prince Albert
- George Parsons Trophy (Sportsmanship): Tony Grenier, Prince Albert
- Hap Emms Memorial Trophy (Goaltender): Ward Komonosky, Prince Albert

All-star team

- Goal: Robert Desjardins, Shawinigan
- Defence: David Goertz, Prince Albert; Yves Beaudoin, Shawinigan
- Centre: Dan Hodgson, Prince Albert
- Left wing: Tony Grenier, Prince Albert
- Right wing: Patrice Lefebvre, Shawinigan
