= 1990–91 NHL season =

National Hockey League season

- League: National Hockey League
- Sport: Ice hockey
- Duration: October 4, 1990 – May 25, 1991
- Games: 80
- Teams: 21
- TV partner(s): CBC, TSN, SRC (Canada); SportsChannel America, NBC (Note: NBC only televised the All-Star Game.) (United States)

Draft
- Top draft pick: Owen Nolan
- Picked by: Quebec Nordiques

Regular season
- Presidents' Trophy: Chicago Blackhawks
- Season MVP: Brett Hull (Blues)
- Top scorer: Wayne Gretzky (Kings)

Playoffs
- Playoffs MVP: Mario Lemieux (Penguins)

Stanley Cup
- Champions: Pittsburgh Penguins
- Runners-up: Minnesota North Stars

NHL seasons
- 1989–90 1991–92

The 1990–91 NHL season was the 74th season of the National Hockey League. The Stanley Cup winners were the Pittsburgh Penguins, who won the best of seven series 4–2 against the Minnesota North Stars to claim their first championship. This was the last NHL season to end in May.

== League business ==
=== Approval for expansion by 1992 ===
At meetings in Florida on December 6, 1990, the NHL Board of Governors awarded provisional franchises to groups from Ottawa and Tampa. The Ottawa franchise marked a return to one of the original cities of the NHL, while Tampa meant the first franchise in the sunbelt state of Florida. In a later book published by NHL president Gil Stein, Stein revealed that the two groups were the only ones of the applicants who agreed to the $50 million expansion fee without question. The Ottawa Senators and Tampa Bay Lightning began play in the 1992–93 season.

=== Entry draft ===
The 1990 NHL entry draft was held on June 16, at BC Place in Vancouver, British Columbia. Owen Nolan was selected first overall by the Quebec Nordiques.

== Regular season ==
=== Final standings ===
Note: W = Wins, L = Losses, T = Ties, GF= Goals For, GA = Goals Against, Pts = Points

==== Wales Conference ====
Adams Division
	GP	W	L	T	GF	GA	Pts
Boston Bruins	80	44	24	12	299	264	100
Montreal Canadiens	80	39	30	11	273	249	89
Buffalo Sabres	80	31	30	19	292	278	81
Hartford Whalers	80	31	38	11	238	276	73
Quebec Nordiques	80	16	50	14	236	354	46

Patrick Division
	GP	W	L	T	GF	GA	Pts
Pittsburgh Penguins	80	41	33	6	342	305	88
New York Rangers	80	36	31	13	297	265	85
Washington Capitals	80	37	36	7	258	258	81
New Jersey Devils	80	32	33	15	272	264	79
Philadelphia Flyers	80	33	37	10	252	267	76
New York Islanders	80	25	45	10	223	290	60

==== Campbell Conference ====
Norris Division
	GP	W	L	T	GF	GA	Pts
Chicago Blackhawks	80	49	23	8	284	211	106
St. Louis Blues	80	47	22	11	310	250	105
Detroit Red Wings	80	34	38	8	273	298	76
Minnesota North Stars	80	27	39	14	256	266	68
Toronto Maple Leafs	80	23	46	11	241	318	57

Smythe Division
	GP	W	L	T	GF	GA	Pts
Los Angeles Kings	80	46	24	10	340	254	102
Calgary Flames	80	46	26	8	344	263	100
Edmonton Oilers	80	37	37	6	272	272	80
Vancouver Canucks	80	28	43	9	243	315	65
Winnipeg Jets	80	26	43	11	260	288	63

== Playoffs ==
=== Bracket ===
The top four teams in each division qualified for the playoffs. In each round, teams competed in a best-of-seven series (scores in the bracket indicate the number of games won in each best-of-seven series). In the division semifinals, the fourth seeded team in each division played against the division winner from their division. The other series matched the second and third place teams from the divisions. The two winning teams from each division's semifinals then met in the division finals. The two division winners of each conference then played in the conference finals. The two conference winners then advanced to the Stanley Cup Final.

Division semifinals	Division finals
A1	Boston	4
A4	Hartford	2
A1	Boston	4
A2	Montreal	3
A2	Montreal	4
A3	Buffalo	2
Prince of Wales Conference
P1	Pittsburgh	4
P4	New Jersey	3
P1	Pittsburgh	4
P3	Washington	1
P2	NY Rangers	2
P3	Washington	4
N1	Chicago	2
N4	Minnesota	4
N4	Minnesota	4
N2	St. Louis	2
N2	St. Louis	4
N3	Detroit	3
Clarence Campbell Conference
S1	Los Angeles	4
S4	Vancouver	2
S1	Los Angeles	2
S3	Edmonton	4
S2	Calgary	3
S3	Edmonton	4

Conference finals
A1	Boston	2
P1	Pittsburgh	4
N4	Minnesota	4
S3	Edmonton	1

Stanley Cup Final
P1	Pittsburgh	4
N4	Minnesota	2

== Awards ==
Presidents' Trophy:	Chicago Blackhawks
Prince of Wales Trophy: (Wales Conference playoff champion)	Pittsburgh Penguins
Clarence S. Campbell Bowl: (Campbell Conference playoff champion)	Minnesota North Stars
Art Ross Trophy:	Wayne Gretzky, Los Angeles Kings
Bill Masterton Memorial Trophy:	Dave Taylor, Los Angeles Kings
Calder Memorial Trophy:	Ed Belfour, Chicago Blackhawks
Conn Smythe Trophy:	Mario Lemieux, Pittsburgh Penguins
Frank J. Selke Trophy:	Dirk Graham, Chicago Blackhawks
Hart Memorial Trophy:	Brett Hull, St. Louis Blues
Jack Adams Award:	Brian Sutter, St. Louis Blues
James Norris Memorial Trophy:	Ray Bourque, Boston Bruins
King Clancy Memorial Trophy:	Dave Taylor, Los Angeles Kings
Lady Byng Memorial Trophy:	Wayne Gretzky, Los Angeles Kings
Lester B. Pearson Award:	Brett Hull, St. Louis Blues
NHL Plus-Minus Award:	Marty McSorley, Los Angeles Kings and Theo Fleury, Calgary Flames
Vezina Trophy:	Ed Belfour, Chicago Blackhawks
William M. Jennings Trophy:	Ed Belfour, Chicago Blackhawks

=== All-Star teams ===
First Team	Position	Second Team
Ed Belfour, Chicago Blackhawks	G	Patrick Roy, Montreal Canadiens
Ray Bourque, Boston Bruins	D	Chris Chelios, Chicago Blackhawks
Al MacInnis, Calgary Flames	D	Brian Leetch, New York Rangers
Wayne Gretzky, Los Angeles Kings	C	Adam Oates, St. Louis Blues
Brett Hull, St. Louis Blues	RW	Cam Neely, Boston Bruins
Luc Robitaille, Los Angeles Kings	LW	Kevin Stevens, Pittsburgh Penguins

== Player statistics ==
=== Scoring leaders ===
Note: GP = Games played; G = Goals; A = Assists; Pts = Points, PIM = Penalties in minutes, PPG = Powerplay goals, SHG = Shorthanded goals, GWG = Game winning goals

Player	Team	GP	G	A	Pts	PIM	±	PPG	SHG	GWG
Wayne Gretzky	Los Angeles Kings	78	41	122	163	16	+30	8	0	5
Brett Hull	St. Louis Blues	78	86	45	131	22	+23	29	0	11
Adam Oates	St. Louis Blues	61	25	90	115	29	+15	3	1	3
Mark Recchi	Pittsburgh Penguins	78	40	73	113	48	0	12	0	9
John Cullen	Pittsburgh Penguins/ Hartford Whalers	78	39	71	110	101	-6	14	0	3
Joe Sakic	Quebec Nordiques	80	48	61	109	24	-26	12	3	7
Steve Yzerman	Detroit Red Wings	80	51	57	108	34	-2	12	6	4
Theoren Fleury	Calgary Flames	79	51	53	104	136	+48	9	7	9
Al MacInnis	Calgary Flames	78	28	75	103	90	+42	17	0	1
Steve Larmer	Chicago Blackhawks	80	44	57	101	79	+37	17	2	9

=== Leading goaltenders ===
GP = Games played; Min = Minutes played; W = Wins; L = Losses; T = Ties; SO = Shutouts; GAA = Goals against average = SV% = Save percentage

Player	Team	GP	Min	W	L	T	SO	GAA	SV%
Ed Belfour	Chicago Blackhawks	74	4127	43	19	7	4	2.47	.910
Tim Cheveldae	Detroit Red Wings	65	3615	30	26	5	2	3.55	.875
Bill Ranford	Edmonton Oilers	60	3415	27	27	3	0	3.2	.893
Ron Tugnutt	Quebec Nordiques	56	3144	12	29	10	0	4.05	.886
Peter Ing	Toronto Maple Leafs	56	3126	16	29	8	1	3.84	.883
Jon Casey	Minnesota North Stars	55	3185	21	20	11	3	2.98	.891
Bob Essensa	Winnipeg Jets	55	2916	19	24	6	4	3.15	.889
Mike Vernon	Calgary Flames	54	3121	31	19	3	1	3.31	.878
Glenn Healy	New York Islanders	53	2999	18	24	9	0	3.32	.893
Chris Terreri	New Jersey Devils	53	2970	24	21	7	1	2.91	.893

== Coaches ==
=== Patrick Division ===
- New Jersey Devils: John Cunniff and Tom McVie
- New York Islanders: Al Arbour
- New York Rangers: Roger Neilson
- Philadelphia Flyers: Paul Holmgren
- Pittsburgh Penguins: Bob Johnson
- Washington Capitals: Terry Murray

=== Adams Division ===
- Boston Bruins: Mike Milbury
- Buffalo Sabres: Rick Dudley
- Hartford Whalers: Rick Ley
- Montreal Canadiens: Pat Burns
- Quebec Nordiques: Dave Chambers

=== Norris Division ===
- Chicago Blackhawks: Mike Keenan
- Detroit Red Wings: Bryan Murray
- Minnesota North Stars: Bob Gainey
- St. Louis Blues: Brian Sutter
- Toronto Maple Leafs: Tom Watt

=== Smythe Division ===
- Calgary Flames: Doug Risebrough
- Edmonton Oilers: John Muckler
- Los Angeles Kings: Tom Webster
- Vancouver Canucks: Bob McCammon and Pat Quinn
- Winnipeg Jets: Bob Murdoch

== Milestones ==
=== Debuts ===
The following is a list of players of note who played their first NHL game in 1990–91 (listed with their first team, asterisk(*) marks debut in playoffs):

- Robert Reichel, Calgary Flames
- Dominik Hasek, Chicago Blackhawks
- Keith Primeau, Detroit Red Wings
- Mike Sillinger, Detroit Red Wings
- Sergei Fedorov, Detroit Red Wings
- Bobby Holik, Hartford Whalers
- Geoff Sanderson, Hartford Whalers
- John LeClair, Montreal Canadiens
- Patrice Brisebois, Montreal Canadiens
- Sean Hill*, Montreal Canadiens
- Doug Weight*, New York Rangers
- Tony Amonte*, New York Rangers
- Mike Ricci, Philadelphia Flyers
- Jaromir Jagr, Pittsburgh Penguins
- Mats Sundin, Quebec Nordiques
- Owen Nolan, Quebec Nordiques
- Petr Nedved, Vancouver Canucks
- Dmitri Khristich, Washington Capitals
- Peter Bondra, Washington Capitals
- Kris Draper, Winnipeg Jets

=== Last games ===
The following is a list of players of note that played their last game in the NHL in 1990–91 (listed with their last team):

- Gord Kluzak, Boston Bruins
- Tony McKegney, Chicago Blackhawks
- Glen Hanlon, Detroit Red Wings
- Don Maloney, New York Islanders
- Lindy Ruff, New York Rangers
- Pete Peeters, Philadelphia Flyers
- Guy Lafleur, Quebec Nordiques
- Harold Snepsts, St. Louis Blues
- Paul MacLean, St. Louis Blues
- Rick Meagher, St. Louis Blues
- Stan Smyl, Vancouver Canucks
- Joel Quenneville, Washington Capitals

== Broadcasting ==
This was the third season of the league's Canadian national broadcast rights deals with TSN and Hockey Night in Canada on CBC. Saturday night regular season games continued to air on CBC, while TSN televised selected weeknight games. Coverage of the Stanley Cup playoffs was primarily on CBC, with TSN airing first round all-U.S. series.

This was the third and final season of the league's original U.S. national broadcast rights deal SportsChannel America, with up to three regular season games a week and coverage of the playoffs. SportsChannel America then signed a one-year extension for the 1991–92 season. Meanwhile, NBC televised the All-Star Game for the second consecutive season.

== See also ==
- List of Stanley Cup champions
- 1990 NHL entry draft
- 1990-91 NHL transactions
- 42nd National Hockey League All-Star Game
- National Hockey League All-Star Game
- NHL All-Rookie Team
- Lester Patrick Trophy
- 1990 in sports
- 1991 in sports
