= 1992 Memorial Cup =

Canadian junior men's ice hockey championship

Tournament details
- Venue(s): Seattle Center Coliseum; Seattle, Washington
- Dates: May 9–17, 1992
- Teams: 4
- Host team: Seattle Thunderbirds (WHL)
- TV partner(s): TSN

Final positions
- Champions: Kamloops Blazers (WHL) (1st title)

Tournament statistics
- Games played: 8

The Memorial Cup trophy

The 1992 Memorial Cup occurred May 9–17 at the Coliseum in Seattle. It was the 74th annual Memorial Cup competition and determined the major junior ice hockey champion of the Canadian Hockey League (CHL). Participating teams were the Western Hockey League host Seattle Thunderbirds, as well as the winners of the Quebec Major Junior Hockey League, Western Hockey League and Ontario Hockey League which were the Verdun Collège Français, Kamloops Blazers and Sault Ste. Marie Greyhounds. Kamloops won their first Memorial Cup in dramatic fashion, defeating Sault Ste. Marie in the final game on Zac Boyer's game-winning goal with 14 seconds remaining in regulation time.

== Teams ==
QMJHL Team OHL Team WHL Team Host Team

=== Kamloops Blazers ===
The Kamloops Blazers represented the Western Hockey League at the 1992 Memorial Cup. During the 1991–92 season, the Blazers played to a league-best record of 51-17-4, earning 106 points and winning the Scotty Munro Memorial Trophy as the regular season champions. The Blazers scored 351 goals during the regular season, the third highest total in the WHL, while allowing a league low 226 goals. In the post-season, the Blazers faced the Tacoma Rockets in the West Division quarter-finals, and easily won the series in a four game sweep. Kamloops earned a bye in the West Division semi-finals, advancing straight to the West Division finals. In the division finals, the Blazers defeated the Seattle Thunderbirds four games to two to advance to the WHL Championship. In the President's Cup finals against the Saskatoon Blades, the Blazers narrowly defeated the Blades four games to three to capture the title and a berth into the 1992 Memorial Cup.

The Blazers were led offensively by Zac Boyer, who scored 40 goals and 109 points in 70 games, finishing seventh in the WHL scoring race. Boyer continued his strong offensive play in the post-season, earning a team high 29 points in 17 games. Craig Lyons led the goal with 44 goals, and had 95 points in 65 games. Shayne Green scored 43 goals and earned 98 points in 71 games, and tied with Mike Mathers and Jarrett Deuling for the team lead in playoff goals with 10. On defense, the Blazers got a big boost when Darryl Sydor was returned to the club after beginning the season with the Los Angeles Kings of the NHL. In only 29 games, Sydor led the defense with nine goals and 48 points. Scott Niedermayer, who also began the season in the NHL with the New Jersey Devils, scored seven goals and 39 points in 37 games. In the post-season, Niedermayer scored nine goals and 23 points in 17 games. Corey Hirsch was the starting goaltender on the Blazers, and in 48 games, he earned a record of 35-10-2 with a 2.72 GAA and a .920 save percentage. Hirsch was awarded the Del Wilson Trophy, which is awarded to the Top Goaltender in the WHL.

The 1992 Memorial Cup was the Blazers fourth appearance in team history. In the 1984 Memorial Cup, the Kamloops Jr. Oilers finished in third place at the tournament. At the 1986 Memorial Cup, the Blazers once again finished in third place. At the 1990 Memorial Cup, Kamloops struggled to a fourth place finish.

=== Sault Ste. Marie Greyhounds ===
The Sault Ste. Marie Greyhounds represented the Ontario Hockey League at the 1992 Memorial Cup. This was the Greyhounds second consecutive appearance at the tournament, as the club won the J. Ross Robertson Cup in 1991. During the 1991–92 season, the Greyhounds finished in first place in the Emms Division with a 41-19-6 record, earning 88 points. The Greyhounds scored 335 goals, the highest total in the OHL. The team also allowed the fewest goals in the league, with 229 goals against. Sault Ste. Marie earned a bye in the Emms Division quarter-finals due to finishing in first place. In the Emms Division semi-finals, the Greyhounds narrowly defeated the Kitchener Rangers four games to three. In the Emms Division finals, Sault Ste. Marie defeated the Niagara Falls Thunder four games to one. In the J. Ross Robertson Cup finals, the Greyhounds faced the North Bay Centennials. Sault Ste. Marie defeated North Bay four games to three to capture the OHL championship and a berth into the 1992 Memorial Cup.

Ralph Intranuovo led the Greyhounds offensively, scoring 50 goals and 113 points in 65 games, finishing seventh in the OHL scoring race. Colin Miller finished just behind Intranuovo with 37 goals and 110 points in 66 games, followed by 33 points in 19 post-season games. Jarrett Reid led the Greyhounds with 53 goals, and his 93 points were the third highest total on the team. Tony Iob, who scored 28 goals and 62 points in 42 games, led the Greyhounds in the playoffs, scoring 17 goals and 34 points in 19 games. Chris Simon was acquired in a mid-season trade with the Ottawa 67's, scored 19 goals and 44 points in 31 games. On defense, Shaun Imber had a solid season, scoring five goals and 59 points in 66 games. In goal, Kevin Hodson had a spectacular season, earning a record of 28-12-4 with a 3.33 GAA and a .896 save percentage. Hodson was awarded the Dave Pinkney Trophy as the Greyhounds allowed the fewest goals in the OHL.

The 1992 Memorial Cup was the Greyhounds second consecutive trip to the tournament. In the 1991 Memorial Cup, Sault Ste. Marie finished a disappointing fourth place. The club also played in the 1985 Memorial Cup, where the Greyhounds placed in third.

=== Seattle Thunderbirds ===
The Seattle Thunderbirds of the Western Hockey League were the host team of the 1992 Memorial Cup, automatically earning a berth in the tournament. The Thunderbirds struggled to a 33-34-5 record, earning 71 points and finishing in fourth place in the West Division during the 1991–92 season. The club scored 292 goals, which was the tenth highest total in the WHL, while they allowed 285 goals against, eighth fewest in the league. In the post-season, the Thunderbirds defeated the Tri-City Americans four games to one in the West Division quarter-finals. In the West Division semi-finals, Seattle upset the Spokane Chiefs three games to one, advancing to the West Division finals against the Kamloops Blazers. The Thunderbirds put up a good fight against the favoured Blazers, however, Seattle lost the series four games to two.

Mike Kennedy led the Thunderbirds offensively, scoring a team high 42 goals and 89 points in 71 games. Kennedy led Seattle in post-season scoring, scoring 11 goals and 17 points in 15 games. Darren McAusland scored 27 goals and 73 points in 71 games, while Blake Knox, who was acquired from the Swift Current Broncos early in the season, scored 26 goals and 61 points in 63 games with Seattle. Turner Stevenson scored 20 goals and 52 points in 58 games, while leading the team with 304 penalty minutes. Kimbi Daniels was returned to the WHL after a stint with the Philadelphia Flyers in the NHL, as he scored seven goals and 21 points in 19 games, while accumulating a whopping 133 penalty minutes. On defense, Jeff Sebastian scored 15 goals and 48 points in 72 games to lead the blue line in scoring. In goal, the Thunderbirds had four goaltenders play 14 or more games. Chris Osgood emerged as the starting goaltender for the team following a mid-season trade with the Brandon Wheat Kings. In 21 games with Seattle, Osgood was 12-7-1 with a 3.20 GAA and a .901 save percentage.

The 1992 Memorial Cup was the first appearance by the Thunderbirds in team history.

=== Verdun Collège Français ===
The Verdun Collège Français represented the Quebec Major Junior Hockey League at the 1992 Memorial Cup. Verdun won the Jean Rougeau Trophy as they finished the 1991–92 season with the best record in the league with a record of 48-17-5, earning 101 points. The team scored the most goals in the QMJHL with 350, while the team allowed the second fewest in the league with 233. In the post-season, Verdun defeated the Saint-Hyacinthe Laser four games to two in the Lebel Division semi-finals. In the division finals, the Collège Français defeated the Shawinigan Cataractes four games to two, earning a berth in the President's Cup. In the final round, Verdun narrowly defeated the Trois-Rivières Draveurs four games to three to clinch the championship and earn a berth in the 1992 Memorial Cup.

The club was led offensively by Robert Guillet, who scored 56 goals and 118 points in 67 games, finishing seventh in the QMJHL scoring race. Guillet followed this up with 14 goals and 25 points in 19 playoff games to win the Guy Lafleur Trophy, awarded to the Most Valuable Player of the playoffs. Martin Tanguay finished second in goals on the club with 41, while he added 50 assists for 91 points in 67 games. David St. Pierre also cracked the 40 goal plateau, as he scored 40 goals and 95 points in 59 games. David Chouinard finished second in points with 97, as he scored 34 goals and 63 assists. Marc Rodgers joined Verdun during the season after being acquired from the Granby Bisons. Rodgers scored 14 goals and 33 points in 29 games, followed by three goals and 16 points in 18 playoff games. Yanick Dupre was another mid-season acquisition, as he scored seven goals and 21 points in 12 games following his trade from the Drummondville Voltigeurs. In the post-season, Dupre scored nine goals and 18 points in 19 games. Joel Bouchard scored nine goals and 46 points in 70 games to lead the defense. Eric Raymond was acquired from the Laval Titan during the season to become the starting goaltender for the team. In 12 games with Verdun, Raymond had a record of 10-1-1 with a GAA of 2.67 and a .905 save percentage. Philippe DeRouville earned a record of 19-6-3 with a 3.14 GAA and a .891 save percentage in 34 games.

The 1991-92 season was the first for the Verdun Collège Français, as the team was the Longueuil Collège Français from 1988 to 1991. This franchise was a revival of the Quebec Remparts, who played in the QMJHL from 1969 to 1985. The Remparts won the 1971 Memorial Cup and participated in the tournament in 1973, 1974 and 1976.

== Round-robin standings ==
Pos	Team	Pld	W	L	GF	GA	
1	Sault Ste. Marie Greyhounds (OHL)	3	3	0	14	8	Advanced directly to the championship game
2	Kamloops Blazers (WHL)	3	2	1	10	7	Advanced to the semifinal game
3	Seattle Thunderbirds (WHL Host)	3	1	2	9	10	Advanced to the semifinal game
4	Verdun Collège Français (QMJHL)	3	0	3	5	13	

== Scores ==
Round-robin

- May 9 Seattle 5-3 Verdun
- May 9 Sault Ste. Marie 6-3 Kamloops
- May 10 Kamloops 4-0 Verdun
- May 12 Sault Ste. Marie 4-2 Verdun
- May 13 Sault Ste. Marie 4-3 Seattle
- May 14 Kamloops 3-1 Seattle

Semi-final

- May 16 Kamloops 8-3 Seattle

Final

- May 17 Kamloops 5-4 Sault Ste. Marie

=== Winning roster ===
1991-92 Kamloops Blazers
Goaltenders: – Corey Hirsch; – Dale Masson	Defencemen: – Craig Bonner; – Jarrett Bousquet; – Scott Ferguson; – Rob LeLacheur; – Scott Niedermayer; – Darryl Sydor	Wingers: – Zac Boyer; – Jarrett Deuling; – Ryan Huska; – Craig Lyons; – Mike Mathers; – Chris Murray; – Tyson Nash; – Eddie Patterson; – Darcy Tucker; – David Wilkie; – Steve Yule	Centres: – Shayne Green; – Lance Johnson; – Todd Johnson; – Scott Loucks; – Rod Stevens; – Jeff Watchorn; Coach: Tom Renney; General Manager: Bob Brown

== Award winners ==
- Stafford Smythe Memorial Trophy (MVP): Scott Niedermayer, Kamloops
- George Parsons Trophy (Sportsmanship): Colin Miller, Sault Ste. Marie
- Hap Emms Memorial Trophy (Goaltender): Corey Hirsch, Kamloops

All-star team

- Goal: Corey Hirsch, Kamloops
- Defence: Scott Niedermayer, Kamloops; Drew Bannister, Sault Ste. Marie
- Centre: Colin Miller, Sault Ste. Marie
- Left wing: Mike Mathers, Kamloops
- Right wing: Turner Stevenson, Seattle
