= Ed Patterson =

Canadian ice hockey player

- Born: November 14, 1972 (age 53) Delta, British Columbia, Canada
- Height: 6 ft 2 in (188 cm)
- Weight: 218 lb (99 kg; 15 st 8 lb)
- Position: Right wing
- Shot: Right
- Played for: Pittsburgh Penguins; Eisbären Berlin; London Knights; Cardiff Devils
- NHL draft: 148th overall, 1991; Pittsburgh Penguins
- Playing career: 1992–2007

Edward Patterson (born November 14, 1972) is a Canadian former professional ice hockey player. He played 68 games in the National Hockey League with the Pittsburgh Penguins between 1993 and 1996. The rest of his career, which lasted from 1992 to 2007, was spent in the minor leagues and then in Europe. Patterson is currently the head coach of the Kamloops Storm of the Kootenay International Junior Hockey League.

== Biography ==
Patterson was born in Delta, British Columbia. As a youth, he played in the 1986 Quebec International Pee-Wee Hockey Tournament with a minor ice hockey team from North Delta, British Columbia.

He played three seasons of junior hockey in the Western Hockey League and was drafted by the Pittsburgh Penguins. He turned professional in 1992 with the Cleveland Lumberjacks. Patterson would play in the minor leagues, with a few stints with the Penguins, until 2000, when he moved to Europe. He played six seasons in Europe before ending his career in 2007.

== Career statistics ==
=== Regular season and playoffs ===
			Regular season					Playoffs
Season	Team	League	GP	G	A	Pts	PIM	GP	G	A	Pts	PIM
1988–89	Seattle Thunderbirds	WHL	46	4	6	10	55	—	—	—	—	—
1989–90	Seattle Thunderbirds	WHL	18	9	2	11	19	—	—	—	—	—
1989–90	Swift Current Broncos	WHL	15	1	3	4	0	4	0	0	0	2
1990–91	Swift Current Broncos	WHL	7	2	7	9	0	—	—	—	—	—
1990–91	Kamloops Blazers	WHL	55	14	33	47	134	5	0	0	0	7
1991–92	Kamloops Blazers	WHL	38	19	25	44	120	1	0	0	0	0
1991–92	Kamloops Blazers	M-Cup	—	—	—	—	—	5	0	2	2	2
1992–93	Cleveland Lumberjacks	IHL	63	4	16	20	131	3	1	1	2	2
1993–94	Pittsburgh Penguins	NHL	27	3	1	4	10	—	—	—	—	—
1993–94	Cleveland Lumberjacks	IHL	55	21	32	53	73	—	—	—	—	—
1994–95	Cleveland Lumberjacks	IHL	58	13	17	30	93	4	1	2	3	6
1995–96	Pittsburgh Penguins	NHL	35	0	2	2	38	—	—	—	—	—
1996–97	Pittsburgh Penguins	NHL	6	0	0	0	8	—	—	—	—	—
1996–97	Cleveland Lumberjacks	IHL	40	6	12	18	75	13	2	4	6	61
1997–98	Grand Rapids Griffins	IHL	81	12	31	43	226	3	2	1	3	8
1998–99	Cincinnati Cyclones	IHL	73	8	25	33	227	3	1	0	1	4
1999–00	Grand Rapids Griffins	IHL	74	20	21	41	141	5	4	0	4	2
2000–01	Grand Rapids Griffins	IHL	70	19	23	42	90	10	1	4	5	17
2001–02	Eisbären Berlin	DEL	57	10	14	24	83	4	1	1	2	2
2002–03	London Knights	BISL	4	1	2	3	2	18	6	10	16	46
2003–04	Cardiff Devils	EIHL	36	10	16	26	68	6	5	4	9	2
2004–05	Cardiff Devils	EIHL	24	8	20	28	32	—	—	—	—	—
2005–06	Cardiff Devils	EIHL	28	6	12	18	44	—	—	—	—	—
2006–07	Cardiff Devils	EIHL	6	1	1	2	32	—	—	—	—	—
IHL totals			514	103	177	280	1056	41	12	12	24	100
NHL totals			68	3	3	6	56	—	—	—	—	—
