= Jarrett Deuling =

Canadian ice hockey player

- Born: March 4, 1974 (age 51); Vernon, British Columbia, Canada
- Height: 6 ft 0 in (183 cm)
- Weight: 225 lb (102 kg; 16 st 1 lb)
- Position: Left Wing
- Shot: Left
- Played for: New York Islanders
- NHL draft: 56th overall, 1992; New York Islanders
- Playing career: 1994–2001

Jarrett Rufus Deuling (born March 4, 1974, in Vernon, British Columbia) is a Canadian retired professional ice hockey player. He played in 15 games for the New York Islanders during the 1995–96 and 1996–97 seasons. The rest of his career, which lasted from 1994 to 2001, was mainly spent in the minor American Hockey League.

== Playing career ==
Deuling played junior hockey with the Kamloops Blazers of the Western Hockey League for four seasons. After being drafted by the NHL's New York Islanders, Jarrett reported to New York's AHL franchise, the Worcester IceCats. He played a full season with Worcester before starting off next year with the Islanders. He played in only 14 games and was quickly sent back down to the IceCats. He finished off the season in the AHL, and again, started the next season with the Islanders. This time Deuling played in only one game for New York before being sent down to the Islanders new AHL affiliate, the Kentucky Thoroughblades. He played a full season in Kentucky before moving on to the International Hockey League, where he played for the Milwaukee Admirals. Deuling played a full season in Milwaukee before returning to the Thoroughblades, now a farm team of the San Jose Sharks, where he finished off his career with three seasons before retiring.

Deuling is the cousin of Rob and Scott Niedermayer.

== Career statistics ==
=== Regular season and playoffs ===
			Regular season					Playoffs
Season	Team	League	GP	G	A	Pts	PIM	GP	G	A	Pts	PIM
1989–90	Whitehorse Bears	AAHL	28	34	48	82	84	—	—	—	—	—
1990–91	Kamloops Blazers	WHL	48	4	12	16	43	12	5	2	7	7
1991–92	Kamloops Blazers	WHL	68	28	26	54	79	17	10	6	16	18
1991–92	Kamloops Blazers	M-Cup	—	—	—	—	—	5	0	2	2	10
1992–93	Kamloops Blazers	WHL	68	31	32	63	93	13	6	7	13	14
1992–93	Kamloops Blazers	M-Cup	—	—	—	—	—	4	1	1	2	6
1993–94	Kamloops Blazers	WHL	70	44	59	103	171	18	13	8	21	43
1994–95	Worcester IceCats	AHL	63	11	8	19	37	—	—	—	—	—
1995–96	New York Islanders	NHL	14	0	1	1	11	—	—	—	—	—
1995–96	Worcester IceCats	AHL	57	16	7	23	57	4	1	2	3	2
1996–97	New York Islanders	NHL	1	0	0	0	0	—	—	—	—	—
1996–97	Kentucky Thoroughblades	AHL	58	15	31	46	57	4	3	0	3	8
1997–98	Milwaukee Admirals	IHL	64	18	18	36	84	10	4	3	7	36
1998–99	Kentucky Thoroughblades	AHL	60	22	31	53	68	12	3	6	9	8
1999–00	Kentucky Thoroughblades	AHL	75	17	25	42	83	8	1	1	2	6
2000–01	Kentucky Thoroughblades	AHL	54	10	29	39	61	3	0	0	0	0
AHL totals			367	91	131	222	363	31	8	9	17	24
NHL totals			15	0	1	1	11	—	—	—	—	—
