= Darcy Tucker =

Canadian ice hockey player (born 1975)

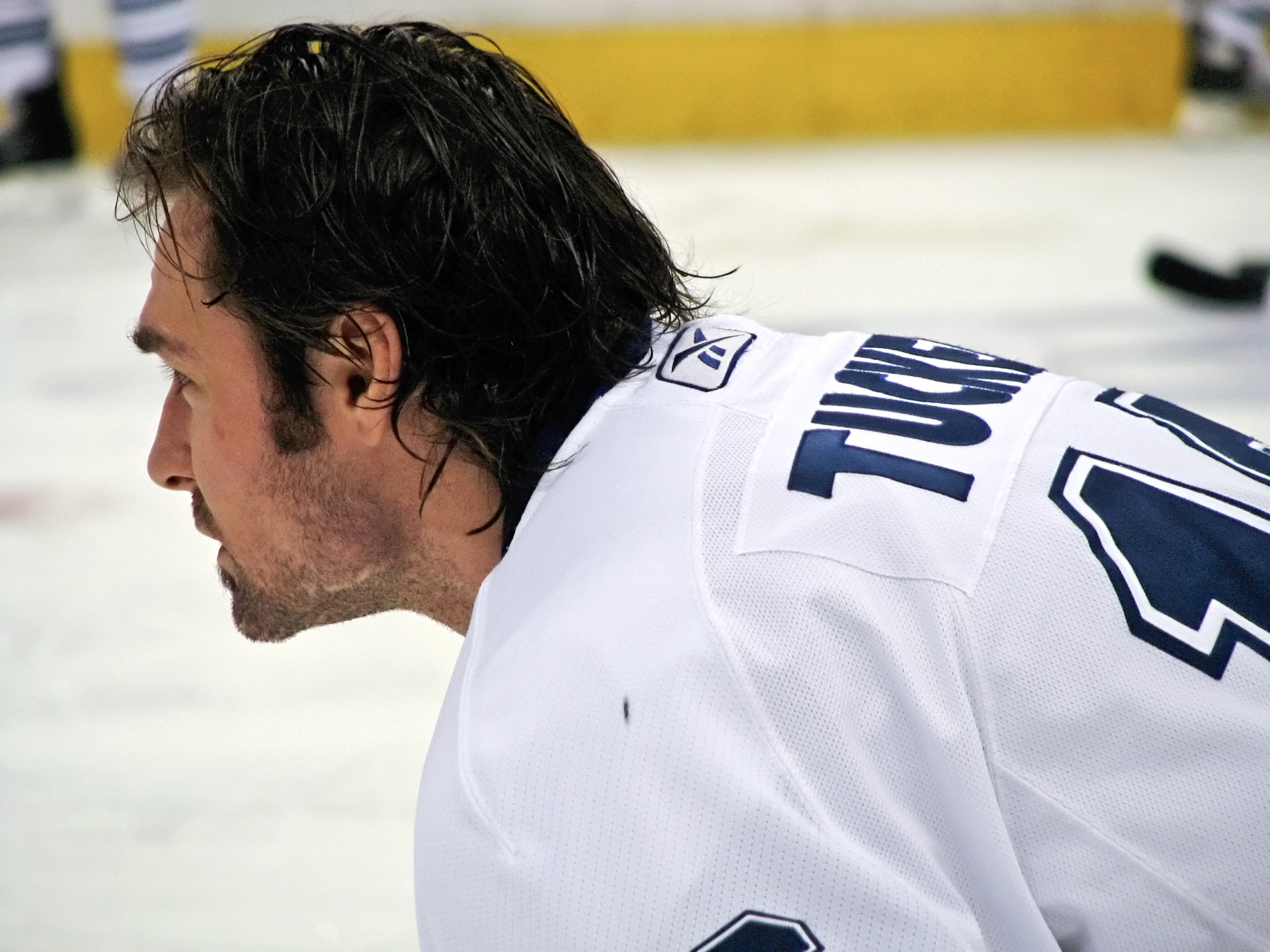
- Tucker with the Toronto Maple Leafs in 2008
- Born: March 15, 1975 (age 51) Castor, Alberta, Canada
- Height: 5 ft 10 in (178 cm)
- Weight: 178 lb (81 kg; 12 st 10 lb)
- Position: Right wing
- Shot: Left
- Played for: Montreal Canadiens; Tampa Bay Lightning; Toronto Maple Leafs; Colorado Avalanche
- NHL draft: 151st overall, 1993; Montreal Canadiens
- Playing career: 1995–2010

Darcy Tucker (born March 15, 1975) is a Canadian former professional ice hockey player. He played most of his National Hockey League (NHL) career with the Toronto Maple Leafs. A sixth round draft choice, Tucker began his NHL career with the Montreal Canadiens. Throughout his NHL career he also played for the Tampa Bay Lightning and the Colorado Avalanche. Tucker was born in Castor, Alberta, but grew up in Endiang, Alberta. Tucker is of Métis descent.

== Playing career ==
Tucker is one of three players, along with Tyson Nash and Ryan Huska, that were a part of all three Kamloops Blazers Memorial Cup wins in 1992, 1994 and 1995. In 1996, while playing for the Fredericton Canadiens of the American Hockey League (AHL), he won the Dudley "Red" Garrett Memorial Award as the AHL's top rookie.

Tucker was drafted in the sixth round, 151st overall, by the Montreal Canadiens in the 1993 NHL entry draft. He was traded to the Tampa Bay Lightning with Stéphane Richer and David Wilkie for Patrick Poulin, Igor Ulanov and Mick Vukota in 1998, where he played for three seasons before being traded to the Toronto Maple Leafs in 2000 for Mike Johnson.

Tucker became notorious on Long Island during the 2002 Stanley Cup playoffs after he lowbridged the New York Islanders' captain Michael Peca during Game 5 of the first round. The check blew out Peca's MCL and ACL on his left knee, ending his playoff campaign and delaying his entry into the 2002–03 season. No penalty was assessed. In the 2006 off-season, the Leafs signed Peca to a one-year contract, making Tucker and Peca teammates.

On June 24, 2008, Tucker became an unrestricted free agent after the Maple Leafs bought-out the remainder of his contract, paying Tucker $1 million per year over six years. On July 1, 2008, he signed a two-year, $4.5 million contract with the Colorado Avalanche.

On October 1, 2010, as a free agent just prior to the 2010–11 season, Tucker announced his retirement from professional hockey after 14 seasons in the NHL. He remained around the game as a player agent.

== Personal ==
In 1998, Tucker married Shannon Corson, the sister of former NHL player Shayne Corson. Shayne and Tucker were teammates on the Maple Leafs for three seasons, and Tucker frequently helped him deal with his panic attacks. Tucker and his wife have three children.

== Career statistics ==
=== Regular season and playoffs ===
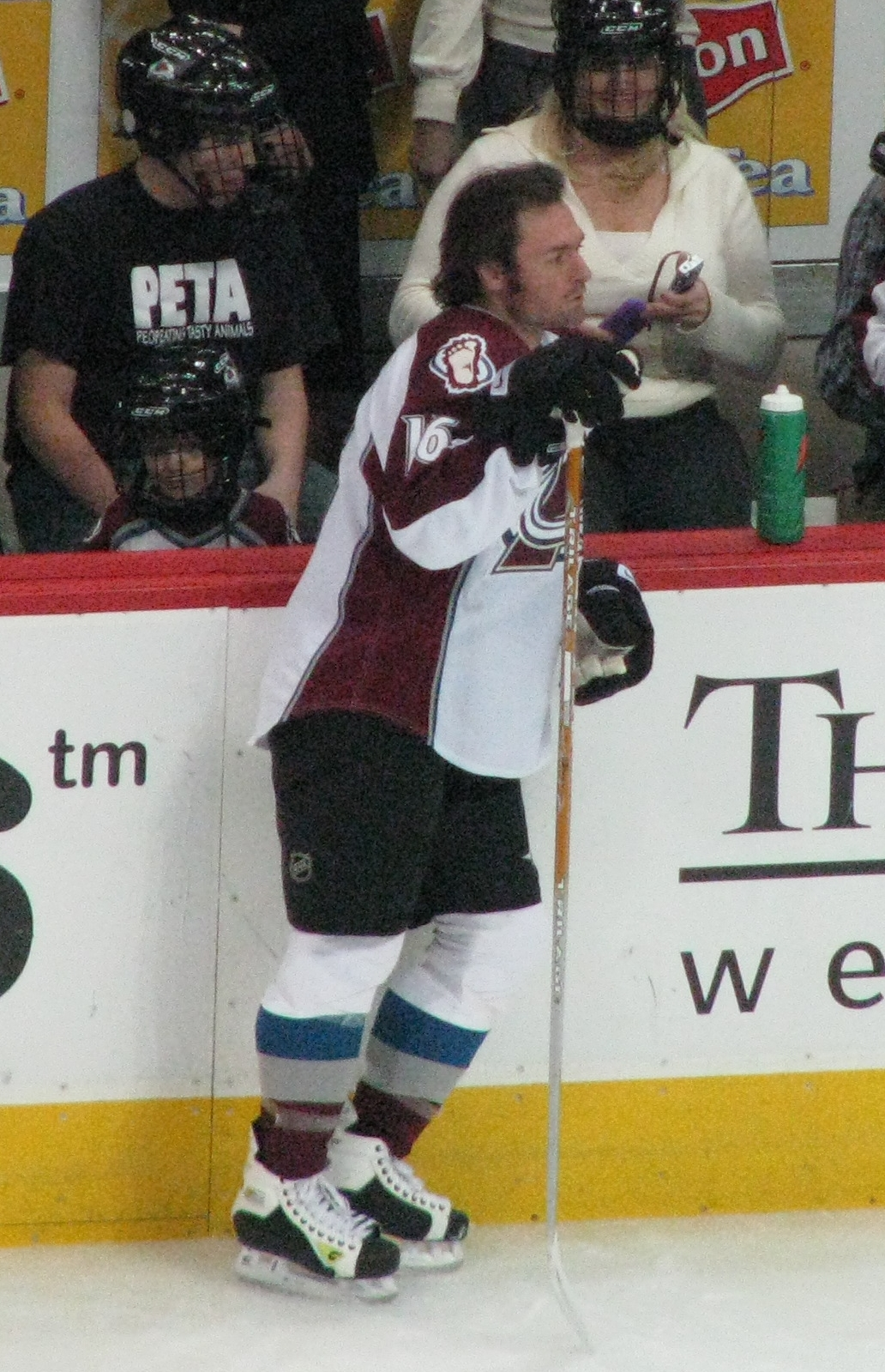
Tucker with the Avalanche in 2009.

			Regular season					Playoffs
Season	Team	League	GP	G	A	Pts	PIM	GP	G	A	Pts	PIM
1991–92	Kamloops Blazers	WHL	26	3	10	13	42	9	0	1	1	16
1992–93	Kamloops Blazers	WHL	67	31	58	89	155	13	7	6	13	34
1993–94	Kamloops Blazers	WHL	66	52	88	140	143	19	9	18	27	43
1994–95	Kamloops Blazers	WHL	64	64	73	137	94	21	16	15	31	19
1995–96	Fredericton Canadiens	AHL	74	29	64	93	174	7	7	3	10	14
1995–96	Montreal Canadiens	NHL	3	0	0	0	0	—	—	—	—	—
1996–97	Montreal Canadiens	NHL	73	7	13	20	110	4	0	0	0	0
1997–98	Montreal Canadiens	NHL	39	1	5	6	57	—	—	—	—	—
1997–98	Tampa Bay Lightning	NHL	35	6	8	14	89	—	—	—	—	—
1998–99	Tampa Bay Lightning	NHL	82	21	22	43	176	—	—	—	—	—
1999–00	Tampa Bay Lightning	NHL	50	14	20	34	108	—	—	—	—	—
1999–00	Toronto Maple Leafs	NHL	27	7	10	17	55	12	4	2	6	15
2000–01	Toronto Maple Leafs	NHL	82	16	21	37	141	11	0	2	2	6
2001–02	Toronto Maple Leafs	NHL	77	24	35	59	92	17	4	4	8	38
2002–03	Toronto Maple Leafs	NHL	77	10	26	36	119	6	0	3	3	6
2003–04	Toronto Maple Leafs	NHL	64	21	11	32	68	12	2	0	2	14
2005–06	Toronto Maple Leafs	NHL	74	28	33	61	100	—	—	—	—	—
2006–07	Toronto Maple Leafs	NHL	56	24	19	43	81	—	—	—	—	—
2007–08	Toronto Maple Leafs	NHL	74	18	16	34	100	—	—	—	—	—
2008–09	Colorado Avalanche	NHL	63	8	8	16	67	—	—	—	—	—
2009–10	Colorado Avalanche	NHL	71	10	14	24	47	6	0	0	0	2
NHL totals			947	215	261	476	1,410	68	10	11	21	81

=== International ===
Medal record

Representing Canada

World Junior Championships
Gold medal – first place	1995 Canada	

Year	Team	Event	Result	GP	G	A	Pts	PIM
1995	Canada	WJC	1st place, gold medalist(s)	7	0	4	4	0
Junior totals				7	0	4	4	0

== Awards ==
Award	Year
WHL
West First All-Star Team	1993–94, 1994–95
Memorial Cup All-Star Team	1993–94, 1994–95
Stafford Smythe Memorial Trophy	1993–94
CHL First All-Star Team	1993–94
AHL
Dudley "Red" Garrett Memorial Award	1995–96
