= Zac Boyer =

Canadian ice hockey player

- Born: October 25, 1971 (age 53); Inuvik, Northwest Territories, Canada
- Height: 6 ft 2 in (188 cm)
- Weight: 200 lb (91 kg; 14 st 4 lb)
- Position: Right wing
- Shot: Right
- Played for: Dallas Stars; SC Herislau; Villacher SV; Düsseldorfer EG
- NHL draft: 88th overall, 1991; Chicago Blackhawks
- Playing career: 1992–2003

Zachary Jason Boyer (born October 25, 1971) is a Canadian former National Hockey League right winger. He played 3 games in the National Hockey League with the Dallas Stars during the 1994–95 and 1995–96 seasons. The rest of his career, which lasted from 1992 to 2003, was mainly spent in the minor leagues.

== Playing career ==
In the final game of the 1992 Memorial Cup, Boyer scored the championship-winning goal for the Kamloops Blazers with 14 seconds remaining in the third period. The assist came from a young Scott Niedermayer, now a member of the Hockey Hall of Fame.

Drafted by the Blackhawks, Boyer spent two seasons with the Dallas Stars with time split with the IHL Blazers, Indianapolis Ice, Michigan K-Wings, Orlando Solar Bears and Houston Aeros. He played for seven different teams in his hockey career. Boyer played in Europe (SC Herisau, EC Villacher SV, Düsseldorfer EG), but ended his playing career with the Colorado Gold Kings and Orlando Seals.

== Career statistics ==
=== Regular season and playoffs ===
			Regular season					Playoffs
Season	Team	League	GP	G	A	Pts	PIM	GP	G	A	Pts	PIM
1985–86	Edmonton Shamrocks	AMHL	35	40	64	104	40	—	—	—	—	—
1986–87	Edmonton Pats	AMHL	35	30	41	71	60	—	—	—	—	—
1987–88	St. Albert Saints	AJHL	55	16	31	47	258	—	—	—	—	—
1988–89	Kamloops Blazers	WHL	36	15	17	32	60	16	9	8	17	10
1989–90	Kamloops Blazers	WHL	71	24	47	71	63	17	4	4	8	8
1989–90	Kamloops Blazers	M-Cup	—	—	—	—	—	3	0	4	4	0
1990–91	Kamloops Blazers	WHL	64	45	60	105	58	12	6	10	16	8
1991–92	Kamloops Blazers	WHL	70	40	69	109	90	17	9	20	29	16
1991–92	Kamloops Blazers	M-Cup	—	—	—	—	—	5	5	4	9	4
1992–93	Indianapolis Ice	IHL	59	7	14	21	26	—	—	—	—	—
1993–94	Indianapolis Ice	IHL	54	13	12	25	67	—	—	—	—	—
1994–95	Dallas Stars	NHL	1	0	0	0	0	2	0	0	0	0
1994–95	Kalamazoo Wings	IHL	22	9	7	16	22	15	3	9	12	8
1995–96	Dallas Stars	NHL	2	0	0	0	0	—	—	—	—	—
1995–96	Michigan K-Wings	IHL	67	24	27	51	58	10	11	6	17	0
1996–97	Orlando Solar Bears	IHL	80	25	49	74	63	3	0	1	1	2
1997–98	SC Herisau	NLA	19	7	16	23	77	—	—	—	—	—
1997–98	Villacher SV	AUT	6	3	5	8	4	—	—	—	—	—
1997–98	Düsseldorfer EG	DEL	15	2	0	2	8	2	0	0	0	0
1998–9	Houston Aeros	IHL	61	16	23	39	40	1	0	0	0	0
2000–01	Colorado Gold Kings	WCHL	66	37	53	90	62	8	2	5	7	16
2001–02	Colorado Gold Kings	WCHL	72	25	66	91	48	5	1	2	3	0
2002–03	Orlando Seals	ACHL	25	19	34	53	30	—	—	—	—	—
IHL totals			343	94	132	226	276	29	14	16	30	10
NHL totals			3	0	0	0	0	2	0	0	0	0
