= Darryl Sydor =

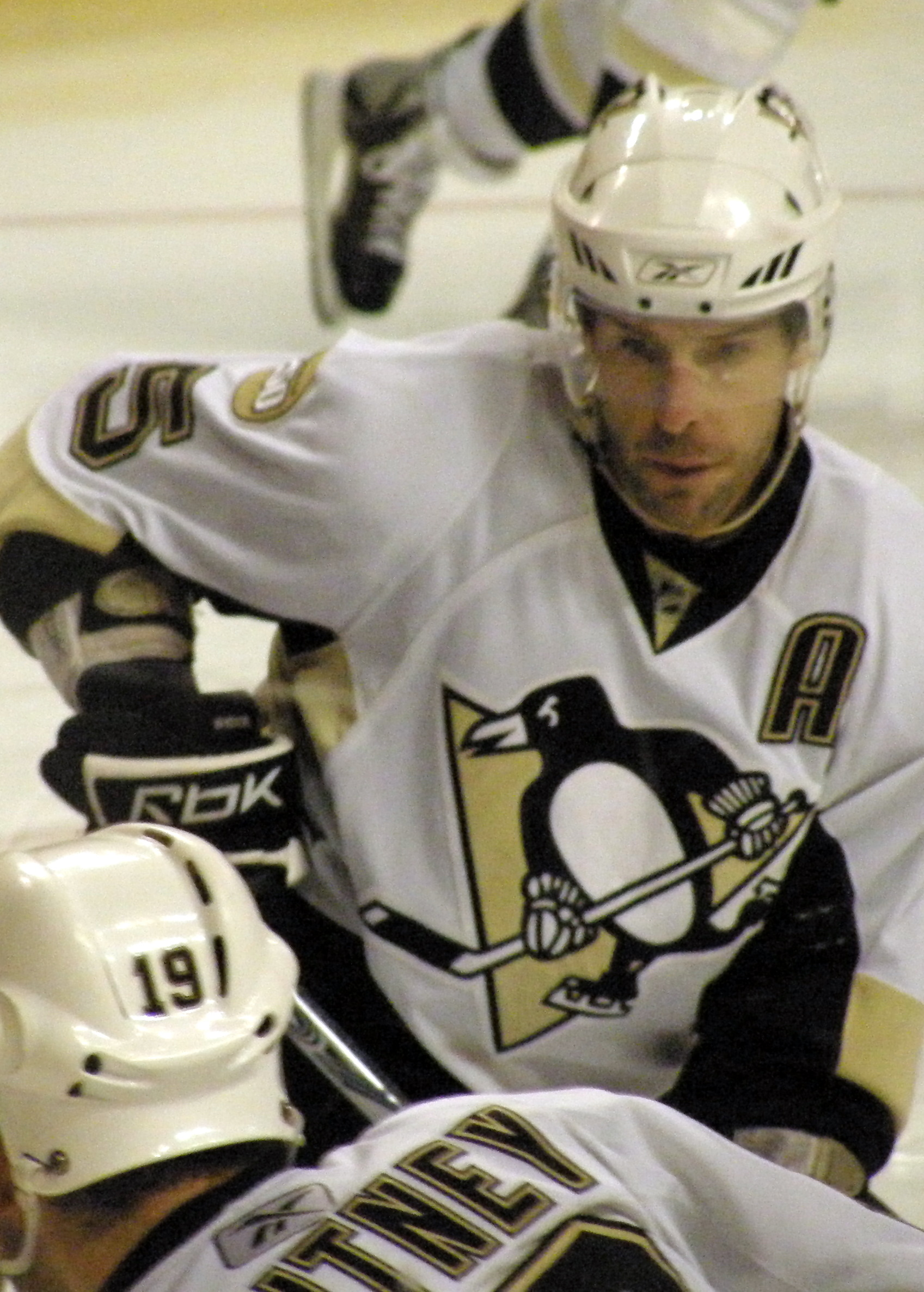
- Sydor with the Pittsburgh Penguins in 2008
- Born: May 13, 1972 (age 54) Edmonton, Alberta, Canada
- Height: 6 ft 1 in (185 cm)
- Weight: 211 lb (96 kg; 15 st 1 lb)
- Position: Defence
- Shot: Left
- Played for: Los Angeles Kings; Dallas Stars; Columbus Blue Jackets; Tampa Bay Lightning; Pittsburgh Penguins; St. Louis Blues
- National team: Canada
- NHL draft: 7th overall, 1990; Los Angeles Kings
- Playing career: 1991–2010

Darryl Marion Sydor (born May 13, 1972) is a Canadian-American former professional ice hockey defenseman. He won two Stanley Cups during his career: with the Dallas Stars in 1999, and with the Tampa Bay Lightning in 2004. He also reached the Stanley Cup Final in 1993 as a member of the Los Angeles Kings, in 2000 as a member of the Dallas Stars and in 2008 as a member of the Pittsburgh Penguins. As a junior, Sydor won a Memorial Cup with the Kamloops Blazers and also represented Canada at the World Junior Championships.

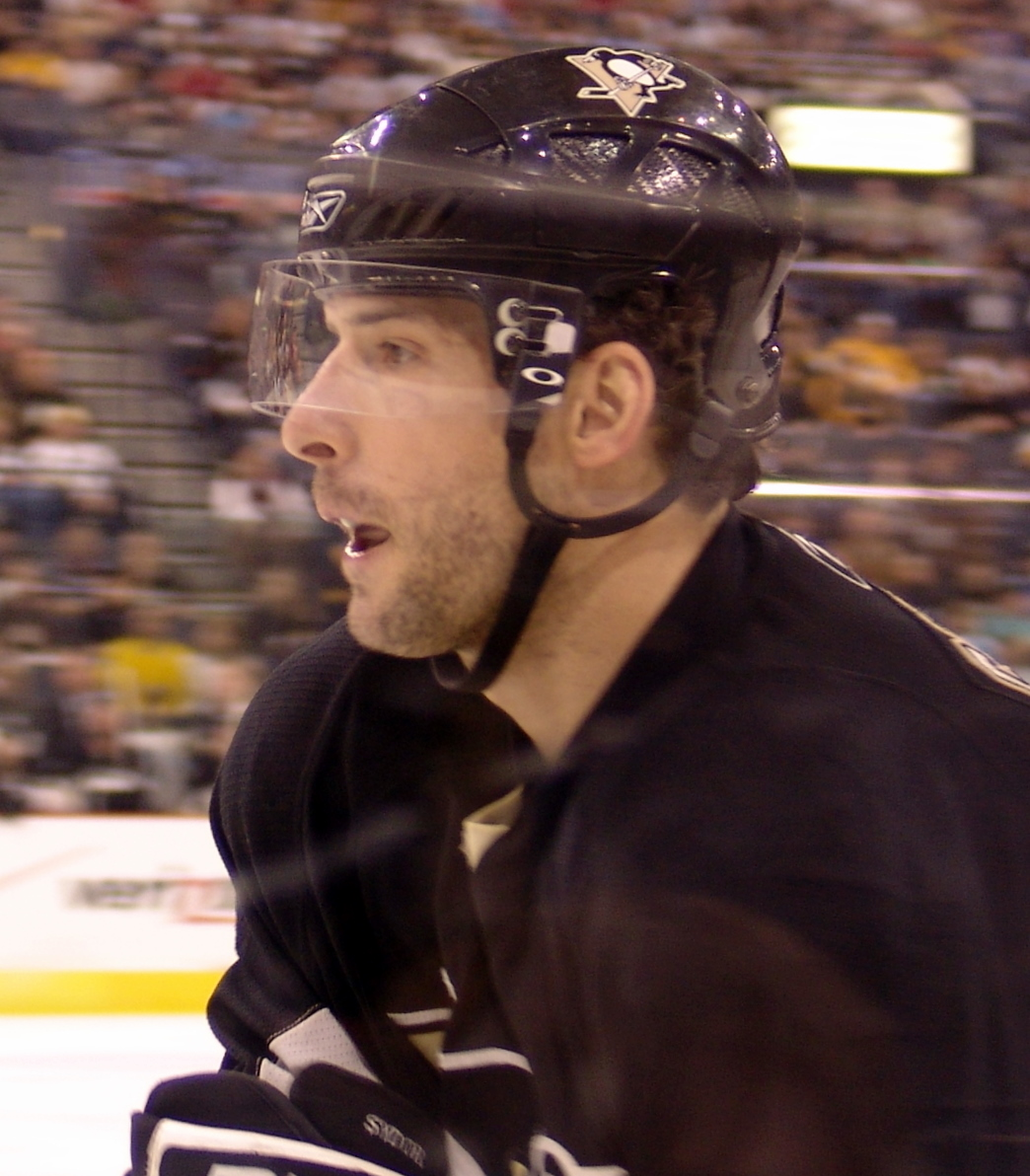
Sydor with the Penguins, March 2008.

== Playing career ==
The Los Angeles Kings selected Sydor seventh overall in the 1990 NHL entry draft. He played four seasons with the Kamloops Blazers of the Western Hockey League (WHL) and won a Memorial Cup championship in 1992. Sydor originally began his Memorial Cup championship season in the National Hockey League (NHL) with the Kings, but was sent back to the WHL after 18 games.

In his first full season with the Kings, Sydor tallied 29 points and helped the club to their first ever Stanley Cup Final appearance. Led by Wayne Gretzky, they were defeated by the Montreal Canadiens. Sydor developed with the Kings, but did not reach his prime until he was traded to the Dallas Stars in 1996. He recorded a career-high 40 assists and 48 points in 1996–97 with the Stars.

During his time with Dallas, Sydor became part of the team's "big four" defenceman, which included Derian Hatcher, Sergei Zubov and Richard Matvichuk. This quartet played a major role in capturing the Stanley Cup in 1999 against the Buffalo Sabres. In the regular season leading up to Sydor's first Stanley Cup championship, he matched his career-high 48 points and established a personal best 14 goals. The following year, Sydor helped the Stars to a second consecutive Finals appearance, but would suffer an injury against the New Jersey Devils. The Stars were kept from repeating as Stanley Cup champions, falling to the Devils in six games.

Sydor played in Dallas for seven-and-a-half seasons before being traded to the Columbus Blue Jackets in the summer of 2003. He played only 49 games with Columbus before being traded to the Tampa Bay Lightning in exchange for prospect Alexander Svitov midway through the season. Bolstering the Lightning's lineup for their 2004 playoff run, Sydor won his second Stanley Cup championship as the Lightning defeated the Calgary Flames in seven games. Sydor remained with the Lightning for one more season and was then traded back to the Dallas Stars on July 2, 2006, for a 2008 fourth-round draft pick in a salary-dumping move.

Returning to Dallas in 2006–07, he became an unrestricted free agent on July 1, 2007. Due to a late-season acquisition for defenceman Mattias Norström, Sydor became the odd man out on the Stars' blueline and did not receive an offer from the club. He instead signed a two-year, $5 million contract with the Pittsburgh Penguins. In his second season with the Penguins, he was traded back to Dallas for his third stint with the club on November 16, 2008, in exchange for Phillippe Boucher.

On September 3, 2009, Sydor was invited to the St. Louis Blues training camp for the 2009–10 season. On September 25, Sydor signed a one-year contract with the Blues, serving primarily as a seventh defenceman. He announced his retirement from the NHL as a player on July 13, 2010.

== Coaching career ==
Sydor spent the 2010–11 season as an assistant coach of the Houston Aeros of the American Hockey League (AHL) under head coach Mike Yeo. Under their leadership, the Aeros won the Western Conference title. On June 30, 2011, Sydor was announced as one of the new assistant coaches of the NHL's Minnesota Wild, again serving under Yeo. When Yeo became the head coach of the St. Louis Blues, Sydor again followed, working with the Blues' AHL affiliate Chicago Wolves in 2016–17 and as a Blues' assistant coach in 2017–18. He left the Blues in 2018 to spend more time with family. On January 12, 2019, Sydor was hired as the assistant coach of the Kamloops Blazers of the Western Hockey League.

== Awards ==
- Won President's Cup (WHL champions; Kamloops Blazers) in 1990 and 1992.
- WHL West First All-Star Team – 1990, 1991 & 1992
- Won Memorial Cup (CHL champions; Kamloops Blazers) in 1992.
- Played in the NHL All-Star Game in 1998 and 1999.
- Stanley Cup champion in 1999 (Dallas Stars) and 2004 (Tampa Bay Lightning).

== Personal life ==
Sydor and his wife Sharlene have four sons: Parker, Braden, Dylan and Cooper. At the end of 2006, Sydor was naturalized with his wife as US citizens at a Dallas elementary school.

On August 21, 2015, Sydor was charged with drunken driving after police arrested him while he was driving his 12-year-old son to a hockey tournament. According to the criminal complaint filed in Anoka County District Court, Sydor's blood alcohol level tested at 0.30, more than three times the legal limit.

Sydor voluntarily entered the NHL/NHL Players' Association Substance Abuse/Behavioral Health Program and admitted himself into an inpatient centre in Malibu, California, on August 22 to seek treatment for alcoholism, earning the respect of fellow Blazers' majority owner Tom Gaglardi.

Sydor is a part owner of the Kamloops Blazers.

== Career statistics ==
=== Regular season and playoffs ===
			Regular season					Playoffs
Season	Team	League	GP	G	A	Pts	PIM	GP	G	A	Pts	PIM
1987–88	Edmonton Mets	AJHL	38	10	11	21	54	—	—	—	—	—
1988–89	Kamloops Blazers	WHL	65	12	14	26	86	15	1	4	5	19
1989–90	Kamloops Blazers	WHL	67	29	66	95	129	17	2	9	11	28
1989–90	Kamloops Blazers	MC	—	—	—	—	—	3	4	0	4	2
1990–91	Kamloops Blazers	WHL	66	27	78	105	88	12	3	22	25	10
1991–92	Kamloops Blazers	WHL	29	9	39	48	33	17	3	15	18	18
1991–92	Los Angeles Kings	NHL	18	1	5	6	22	—	—	—	—	—
1991–92	Kamloops Blazers	MC	—	—	—	—	—	5	0	2	2	6
1992–93	Los Angeles Kings	NHL	80	6	23	29	63	24	3	8	11	16
1993–94	Los Angeles Kings	NHL	84	8	27	35	94	—	—	—	—	—
1994–95	Los Angeles Kings	NHL	48	4	19	23	36	—	—	—	—	—
1995–96	Los Angeles Kings	NHL	58	1	11	12	34	—	—	—	—	—
1995–96	Dallas Stars	NHL	26	2	6	8	41	—	—	—	—	—
1996–97	Dallas Stars	NHL	82	8	40	48	51	7	0	2	2	0
1997–98	Dallas Stars	NHL	79	11	35	46	51	17	0	5	5	14
1998–99	Dallas Stars	NHL	74	14	34	48	50	23	3	9	12	16
1999–2000	Dallas Stars	NHL	74	8	26	34	32	23	1	6	7	6
2000–01	Dallas Stars	NHL	82	10	37	47	34	10	1	3	4	0
2001–02	Dallas Stars	NHL	78	4	29	33	50	—	—	—	—	—
2002–03	Dallas Stars	NHL	81	5	31	36	40	12	0	6	6	6
2003–04	Columbus Blue Jackets	NHL	49	2	13	15	26	—	—	—	—	—
2003–04	Tampa Bay Lightning	NHL	31	1	6	7	6	23	0	6	6	9
2005–06	Tampa Bay Lightning	NHL	80	4	19	23	30	5	0	1	1	0
2006–07	Dallas Stars	NHL	74	5	16	21	36	7	1	1	2	4
2007–08	Pittsburgh Penguins	NHL	74	1	12	13	26	4	0	0	0	2
2008–09	Pittsburgh Penguins	NHL	8	1	1	2	2	—	—	—	—	—
2008–09	Dallas Stars	NHL	65	2	11	13	16	—	—	—	—	—
2009–10	St. Louis Blues	NHL	47	0	8	8	15	—	—	—	—	—
NHL totals			1,291	98	409	507	755	155	9	47	56	73

=== International ===
Medal record

Representing Canada

World Championships
Gold medal – first place	1994 Italy	
Silver medal – second place	1996 Austria	

Year	Team	Event	Result	GP	G	A	Pts	PIM
1992	Canada	WJC	6th	7	3	1	4	4
1994	Canada	WC	1st place, gold medalist(s)	8	0	1	1	4
1996	Canada	WC	2nd place, silver medalist(s)	8	0	1	1	0
2002	Canada	WC	6th	1	0	0	0	0
Junior totals				7	3	1	4	4
Senior totals				17	0	2	2	4

== See also ==
- List of NHL players with 1,000 games played

Preceded by Martin Gélinas	Los Angeles Kings first-round draft pick 1990	Succeeded by Jamie Storr
