= Marc Rodgers =

Canadian ice hockey player (born 1972)

- Born: March 16, 1972 (age 54) Shawville, Quebec, Canada
- Height: 5 ft 9 in (175 cm)
- Weight: 185 lb (84 kg; 13 st 3 lb)
- Position: Right wing
- Shot: Right
- Played for: Detroit Red Wings; SERC Wild Wings; Vojens Lions
- NHL draft: Undrafted
- Playing career: 1992–2003

Marc Rodgers (born March 16, 1972) is a Canadian former professional ice hockey player. He played 21 games in the National Hockey League with the Detroit Red Wings during the 1999–00 season. The rest of his career, which lasted from 1992 to 2003, was mainly spent in the minor leagues.

== Biography ==
Rodgers was born in Shawville, Quebec. As a youth, he played in the 1985 and 1986 Quebec International Pee-Wee Hockey Tournaments with the Hull Olympiques minor ice hockey team. He later played 21 games in the National Hockey League with the Detroit Red Wings. Rodgers went on to coach at the SPHL level with the Knoxville Ice Bears from 2008 - 2010. In 1996, Rodgers scored the game winning overtime goal for the Utah Grizzlies to win the Turner Cup.

== Career statistics ==
=== Regular season and playoffs ===
			Regular season					Playoffs
Season	Team	League	GP	G	A	Pts	PIM	GP	G	A	Pts	PIM
1986–87	Outaouais Frontaliers	QMAAA	42	16	18	34	—	3	0	2	2	6
1987–88	Outaouais Frontaliers	QMAAA	38	30	37	67	87	—	—	—	—	—
1988–89	Granby Bisons	QMJHL	65	11	21	32	70	4	0	2	2	44
1989–90	Granby Bisons	QMJHL	61	24	31	55	155	—	—	—	—	—
1990–91	Granby Bisons	QMJHL	64	28	49	77	41	—	—	—	—	—
1991–92	Granby Bisons	QMJHL	36	30	57	87	49	—	—	—	—	—
1991–92	Verdun College-Francais	QMJHL	29	14	19	33	60	18	3	13	16	28
1991–92	Verdun College-Francais	M-Cup	—	—	—	—	—	3	0	1	1	13
1992–93	Wheeling Thunderbirds	ECHL	64	23	40	63	91	6	1	1	2	8
1993–94	Las Vegas Thunder	IHL	40	7	7	14	110	4	0	2	2	17
1993–94	Knoxville Cherokees	ECHL	27	12	18	30	83	—	—	—	—	—
1994–95	Las Vegas Thunder	IHL	58	17	19	36	131	10	2	6	8	25
1995–96	Las Vegas Thunder	IHL	51	13	16	29	65	—	—	—	—	—
1995–96	Utah Grizzlies	IHL	31	6	14	20	51	21	4	4	8	16
1996–97	Utah Grizzlies	IHL	5	2	2	4	10	—	—	—	—	—
1996–97	Quebec Rafales	IHL	70	25	42	67	115	9	1	9	10	14
1997–98	Quebec Rafales	IHL	61	20	22	42	61	—	—	—	—	—
1997–98	Chicago Wolves	IHL	11	5	5	10	22	22	9	9	18	10
1998–99	Adirondack Red Wings	AHL	80	19	38	57	66	3	0	0	0	10
1999–00	Detroit Red Wings	NHL	21	1	1	2	10	—	—	—	—	—
1999–00	Manitoba Moose	IHL	34	8	10	18	77	2	1	0	1	6
2000–01	Cincinnati Mighty Ducks	AHL	32	7	5	12	53	4	1	1	2	8
2001–02	Knoxville Speed	UHL	11	4	4	8	6	—	—	—	—	—
2001–02	SERC Wild Wings	DEL	30	2	4	6	45	—	—	—	—	—
2002–03	Vojens Lions	DEN	26	12	20	32	59	—	—	—	—	—
IHL totals			361	103	137	240	642	68	17	30	47	88
NHL totals			21	1	1	2	10	—	—	—	—	—
