= Corey Hirsch =

Canadian ice hockey player (born 1972)

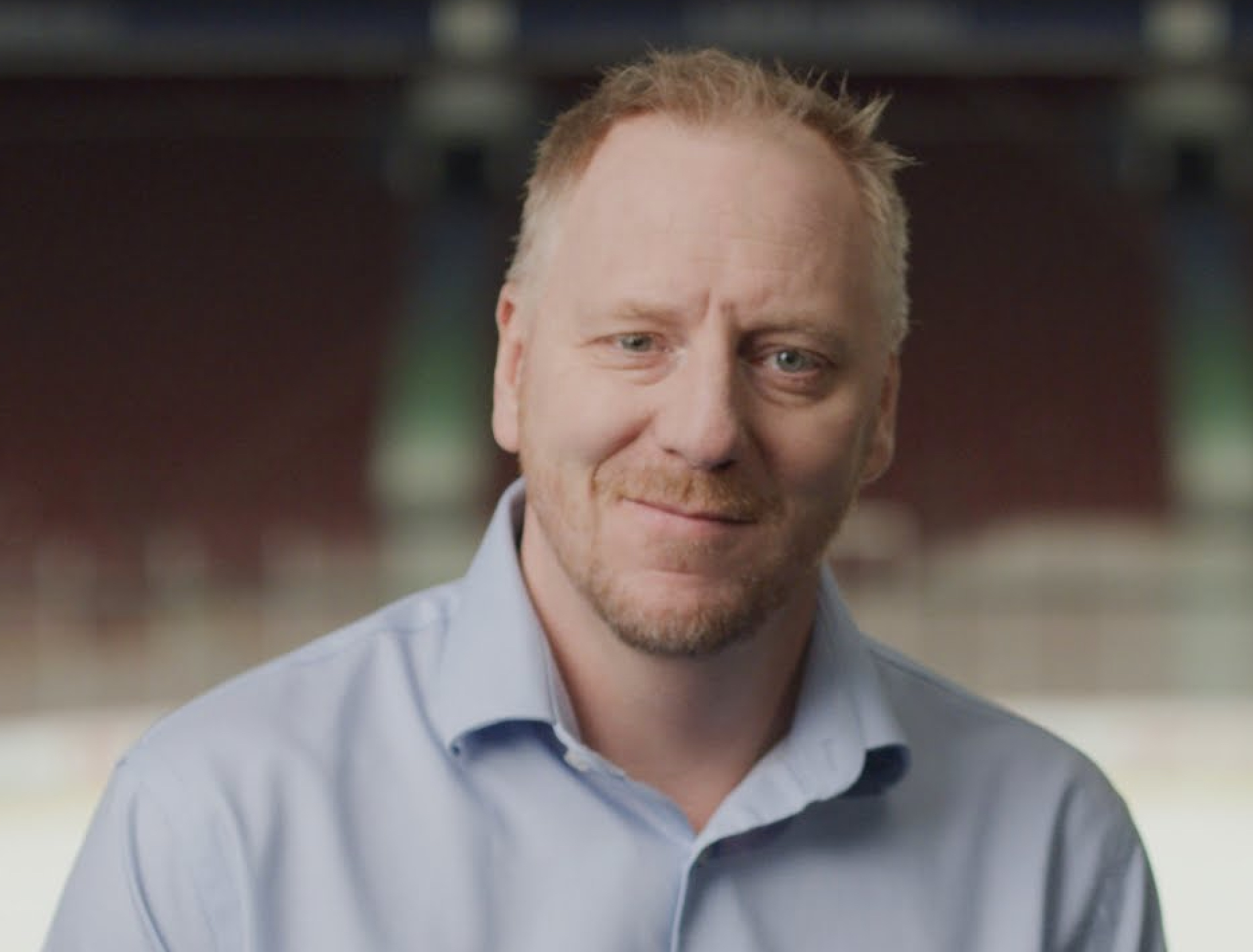
- Hirsch in 2021
- Born: July 1, 1972 (age 54) Medicine Hat, Alberta, Canada
- Height: 5 ft 10 in (178 cm)
- Weight: 181 lb (82 kg; 12 st 13 lb)
- Position: Goaltender
- Caught: Left
- Played for: New York Rangers; Vancouver Canucks; Washington Capitals; Dallas Stars
- National team: Canada
- NHL draft: 169th overall, 1991; New York Rangers
- Playing career: 1992–2006

Olympic medal record

Representing Canada

Men's ice hockey

Olympic Games
Silver medal – second place	1994 Lillehammer	Ice Hockey

World Championships
Bronze medal – third place	1995 Sweden	Ice hockey

Corey Hirsch (born July 1, 1972) is a Canadian former professional ice hockey goaltender. He spent the majority of his National Hockey League (NHL) career with the Vancouver Canucks. He is also the former goaltending coach for the St. Louis Blues, having previously served the Toronto Maple Leafs along with François Allaire.

Hirsch is tied with Tyson Sexsmith for most wins in the Western Hockey League (WHL)'s history, with 120.

== Playing career ==
Born in Medicine Hat, Alberta, Hirsch played major junior hockey with the Kamloops Blazers of the Western Hockey League for four seasons. He was named to the WHL Second All-Star Team in his second season with Kamloops, in which the team won the President's Cup (now the Ed Chynoweth Cup) and advanced to the 1990 Memorial Cup in Hamilton, Ontario, where the Blazers placed third. Hirsch was subsequently chosen 169th overall in the 1991 NHL entry draft by the New York Rangers.

Upon being drafted, Hirsch led the league in shutouts, with 5, and goals against average with 2.72 in 1991–92, he was named CHL Goaltender of the Year and the Del Wilson Trophy as the WHL Goaltender of the Year. As the Blazers again captured President's Cup in 1992, they advanced to the Memorial Cup in Seattle and defeated the Sault Ste. Marie Greyhounds 5–4 in the final. Hirsch was additionally awarded the Hap Emms Memorial Trophy as the tournament's top goaltender.

In 1992–93, his first professional season, he played for the Binghamton Rangers, New York's AHL affiliate, and won the Aldege "Baz" Bastien Memorial Award as the league's top goalie. At 2.79, he was also awarded the Harry "Hap" Holmes Memorial Award for the lowest goals-against-average (shared with goaltending teammate Boris Rousson).

Hirsch started his first NHL game that season, a 2–2 tie against the Detroit Red Wings on January 19, 1993. He recorded his first win on his next start, an 8–3 victory over the Los Angeles Kings on January 23.

At the 1994 Winter Olympics in Lillehammer, Norway, Hirsch played all eight games for Canada and won a silver medal after losing in a shootout to Sweden in the gold medal game. The shootout-winning goal by Peter Forsberg was depicted on a Swedish postage stamp, featuring the image of a generic goalie because Hirsch refused to allow his likeness to be used.

Hirsch remained with Binghamton for three seasons until New York traded him to the Vancouver Canucks on April 7, 1995, in exchange for forward Nathan LaFayette.

Hirsch split goaltending duties with Kirk McLean in 1995–96 and was named to the All-Rookie Team after posting a 2.93 goals-against average, .903 save percentage and a winning 17–14–6 record. He also finished fifth in Calder Memorial Trophy voting (won by Daniel Alfredsson). During the season, he recorded his first career NHL shutout on January 15, 1996, a 6–0 win against the Boston Bruins.

On July 2, 1999, he was waived by the Canucks and for the next few seasons, would bounce around the league between the Nashville Predators, Mighty Ducks of Anaheim, Washington Capitals, and Dallas Stars. Playing for minor league affiliates, he only appeared in a handful of NHL games for the remainder of his career. In 2002–03, he recorded AHL career highs with a 2.64 goals-against average and a .921 save percentage in 35 games with the Utah Grizzlies.

Before retiring, Hirsch played three seasons overseas in the Swedish Elitserien, and the German Deutsche Eishockey Liga.

== Post-playing career ==
After retiring, Hirsch became a goaltending consultant for Hockey Canada. He worked with the national junior team as part of the 2007 and 2008 World Junior gold medal winning teams.

On September 9, 2008, the Toronto Maple Leafs announced they had hired Hirsch as their goaltending coach.

On June 18, 2010, the St. Louis Blues announced they had hired Hirsch as their goaltending coach.

On May 7, 2014, the St. Louis Blues relieved Hirsch of his coaching duties.

In 2015, Hirsch joined the NHL on Sportsnet as a freelance TV analyst.

== Personal ==
Hirsch is a divorcee after 15 years of marriage, with three children. In the summer of 2015, Hirsch's son Hayden, who is a forward, attended hockey training camp with his father's old junior team, the Kamloops Blazers, but didn't make the regular season roster. Hirsch has struggled with severe anxiety and obsessive–compulsive disorder (OCD) for much of his life, and described his struggle in a Player's Tribune article on February 15, 2017 and a video for the Canucks' Hockey Talks initiative. He has since become an outspoken advocate for mental health awareness and ending the stigma associated with mental illness. He elaborated further about his mental health challenges in his autobiography, "The Save of My Life: My Journey Out of the Dark", which was written in collaboration with Sean Patrick Conboy and published in 2022. Hirsch also co-hosts a podcast with psychiatrist Dr. Diane McIntosh called "Blindsided", featuring athletes talking about mental health.

== Awards ==
Major Junior

- WHL West Second All-Star Team – 1990
- WHL West First All-Star Team – 1991 & 1992
- CHL Goaltender of the Year – 1992
- CHL First All-Star Team – 1992
- Hap Emms Memorial Trophy (WHL goaltender of the year) – 1992
- Del Wilson Trophy (Memorial Cup top goaltender) – 1992
- Memorial Cup All-Star Team – 1992

Professional

- Aldege "Baz" Bastien Memorial Award (AHL goaltender of the year) – 1993
- Dudley "Red" Garrett Memorial Award (AHL's lowest goals-against-average) – 1993 (shared with Boris Rousson)
- Harry "Hap" Holmes Memorial Award – 1993
- AHL First All-Star Team – 1993
- NHL All-Rookie Team – 1996
- IHL Goaltender of the Month – December 1999
- IHL Goaltender of the Week – December 4, December 18, 2000

== Career statistics ==
=== Regular season and playoffs ===
			Regular season									Playoffs
Season	Team	League	GP	W	L	T	MIN	GA	SO	GAA	SV%	GP	W	L	MIN	GA	SO	GAA	SV%
1987–88	Calgary Canucks	AJHL	32	22	5	0	1538	91	1	3.55	—	—	—	—	—	—	—	—	—
1988–89	Kamloops Blazers	WHL	32	11	12	2	1516	106	2	4.20	—	5	3	2	245	19	0	4.65	—
1989–90	Kamloops Blazers	WHL	63	48	13	0	3608	230	3	3.82	—	17	14	3	1043	60	0	3.45	—
1989–90	Kamloops Blazers	M-Cup	—	—	—	—	—	—	—	—	—	3	0	3	191	18	0	5.65	—
1990–91	Kamloops Blazers	WHL	38	26	7	1	1970	100	3	3.05	—	11	5	6	623	42	0	4.04	—
1991–92	Kamloops Blazers	WHL	48	35	10	2	2732	124	5	2.72	—	16	11	5	954	35	2	2.20	—
1991–92	Kamloops Blazers	M-Cup	—	—	—	—	—	—	—	—	—	5	4	1	300	13	1	2.60	—
1992–93	New York Rangers	NHL	4	1	2	1	224	14	0	3.75	.879	—	—	—	—	—	—	—	—
1992–93	Binghamton Rangers	AHL	46	35	4	5	2692	125	1	2.79	—	14	7	7	831	46	0	3.32	—
1993–94	Canada	Intl.	45	24	17	3	2653	124	0	2.80	—	—	—	—	—	—	—	—	—
1993–94	Binghamton Rangers	AHL	10	5	4	1	610	38	0	3.74	—	—	—	—	—	—	—	—	—
1994–95	Binghamton Rangers	AHL	57	31	20	5	3371	175	0	3.11	.894	—	—	—	—	—	—	—	—
1995–96	Vancouver Canucks	NHL	41	17	14	6	2338	114	1	2.93	.903	6	2	3	338	21	0	3.73	.873
1996–97	Vancouver Canucks	NHL	39	12	20	4	2127	116	2	3.27	.894	—	—	—	—	—	—	—	—
1997–98	Vancouver Canucks	NHL	1	0	0	0	50	5	0	6.00	.853	—	—	—	—	—	—	—	—
1997–98	Syracuse Crunch	AHL	60	30	22	6	3512	187	1	3.19	.902	5	2	3	297	10	1	2.02	—
1998–99	Vancouver Canucks	NHL	20	3	8	3	919	48	1	3.13	.890	—	—	—	—	—	—	—	—
1998–99	Syracuse Crunch	AHL	5	2	3	0	300	14	0	2.80	.909	—	—	—	—	—	—	—	—
1999–2000	Milwaukee Admirals	IHL	19	9	8	1	1098	49	0	2.68	.891	—	—	—	—	—	—	—	—
1999–2000	Utah Grizzlies	IHL	17	9	5	1	937	42	3	2.69	.914	2	0	2	121	4	0	1.98	—
2000–01	Albany River Rats	AHL	4	0	4	0	199	19	0	5.73	.862	—	—	—	—	—	—	—	—
2000–01	Washington Capitals	NHL	1	1	0	0	20	0	0	0.00	1.000	—	—	—	—	—	—	—	—
2000–01	Cincinnati Cyclones	IHL	13	11	2	0	783	28	1	2.15	.935	—	—	—	—	—	—	—	—
2000–01	Portland Pirates	AHL	36	17	17	2	2142	104	1	2.91	.912	2	0	2	118	7	0	3.56	.915
2001–02	Portland Pirates	AHL	23	6	12	5	1395	62	1	2.67	.920	—	—	—	—	—	—	—	—
2001–02	Philadelphia Phantoms	AHL	5	2	3	0	299	14	1	2.81	.883	—	—	—	—	—	—	—	—
2002–03	Dallas Stars	NHL	2	0	1	0	97	4	0	2.47	.897	—	—	—	—	—	—	—	—
2002–03	Utah Grizzlies	AHL	35	14	16	2	1953	86	0	2.64	.921	1	0	1	60	5	0	5.00	.904
2003–04	Timrå IK	SEL	5	2	3	0	312	11	1	1.73	.932	7	3	3	364	11	0	1.81	.934
2004–05	Kassel Huskies	DEL	12	—	—	—	695	31	0	2.68	.920	—	—	—	—	—	—	—	—
AHL totals			281	142	105	26	16,473	824	5	3.00	—	22	9	13	1306	68	1	3.12	—
NHL totals			108	34	45	14	5775	301	4	3.13	.896	6	2	3	338	21	0	3.73	.873
IHL totals			49	29	15	2	2818	119	4	2.53	.913	2	0	2	121	4	0	1.98	—

=== International ===
Year	Team	Event	GP	W	L	T	MIN	GA	SO	GAA
1994	Canada	OG	8	5	2	1	495	18	0	2.18
1995	Canada	WC	8	4	3	1	488	21	0	2.58
Senior totals			16	9	5	2	983	39	0	2.38

Awards and achievements
Preceded by Félix Potvin	Aldege "Baz" Bastien Memorial Award; 1992–93	Succeeded by Frédéric Chabot
