= Kamloops Blazers =

Western Hockey League team in Kamloops, British Columbia

- City: Kamloops, British Columbia
- League: Western Hockey League
- Conference: Western
- Division: B.C.
- Founded: 1966
- Home arena: Sandman Centre
- Colours: Blue, white, orange
- Owners: Tom Gaglardi (majority); Shane Doan; Jarome Iginla; Mark Recchi; Darryl Sydor
- General manager: Shaun Clouston
- Head coach: Shaun Clouston
- Website: chl.ca/whl-blazers/

Franchise history
- 1966–1971: Estevan Bruins
- 1971–1981: New Westminster Bruins
- 1981–1984: Kamloops Junior Oilers
- 1984–present: Kamloops Blazers

Championships
- Regular season titles: 7 (1983–84, 1986–87, 1989–90, 1990–91, 1991–92, 1993–94, 1994–95)
- Playoff championships: Memorial Cup; 3 (1992, 1994, 1995); Ed Chynoweth Cup; 6 (1984, 1986, 1990, 1992, 1994, 1995); Division Titles; 9 (1984, 1985, 1986, 1988, 1990, 1992, 1994, 1995, 1999)

Current uniform

The Kamloops Blazers are a Canadian major junior ice hockey team based in Kamloops, British Columbia. The team plays in the B.C. Division of the Western Hockey League's Western Conference and plays its home games at the Sandman Centre. The Blazers originated as the Estevan Bruins in 1966, became the New Westminster Bruins in 1971, and relocated to Kamloops in 1981 as the Kamloops Junior Oilers. After moving to Kamloops, the Blazers became the WHL's most successful club, winning a record six President's Cups, a record seven Scotty Munro Memorial Trophies, and three Memorial Cup titles, all between 1983 and 1995.

== History ==
The Blazers franchise originated as one of the league's founding clubs, the Estevan Bruins, when the league launched in 1966. After winning a league title in 1968, owner and manager Scotty Munro sold his stake in the club in 1969 and moved on to the Calgary Centennials; two years later, the team moved to New Westminster, British Columbia, as part of the Western Canada Hockey League's effort to span the four Western Canadian provinces. The New Westminster Bruins established a WCHL dynasty in the 1970s, winning four consecutive league titles between 1975 and 1978 and the 1977 and 1978 Memorial Cups. Despite the team's success, it was relocated again in 1981, moving to Kamloops, where the team—supported directly by the National Hockey League's Edmonton Oilers—was initially known as the Junior Oilers. In 1984, the team came under community ownership and was renamed the Blazers.

In Kamloops, the Blazers quickly established a dynasty of their own. The team made three straight finals appearances from 1984 to 1986, winning in their first and third appearances; after a finals loss in 1988, the team would win four more President's Cups between 1990 and 1995. Led at various times by future NHL stars Scott Niedermayer, Darryl Sydor, Jarome Iginla, Shane Doan, Darcy Tucker, Corey Hirsch, and others, and managed by future NHL coaches including Ken Hitchcock and Tom Renney, the Blazers went on to win three Memorial Cup titles in a four-year span, the only team to achieve such a feat. The Blazers hosted the third Memorial Cup tournament in that run in 1995.

When the team arrived in Kamloops, they played at the Kamloops Memorial Arena before moving to the new Riverside Coliseum in 1992.

After their run of success, the Blazers would go twelve seasons without winning a playoff round; the team missed the playoffs for the first time in 2006, and missed four more times between 2011 and 2018. The team hosted the Memorial Cup for a second time in 2023. At the tournament, they were eliminated in overtime of a tie-breaker game against the Peterborough Petes.

== Season-by-season record ==
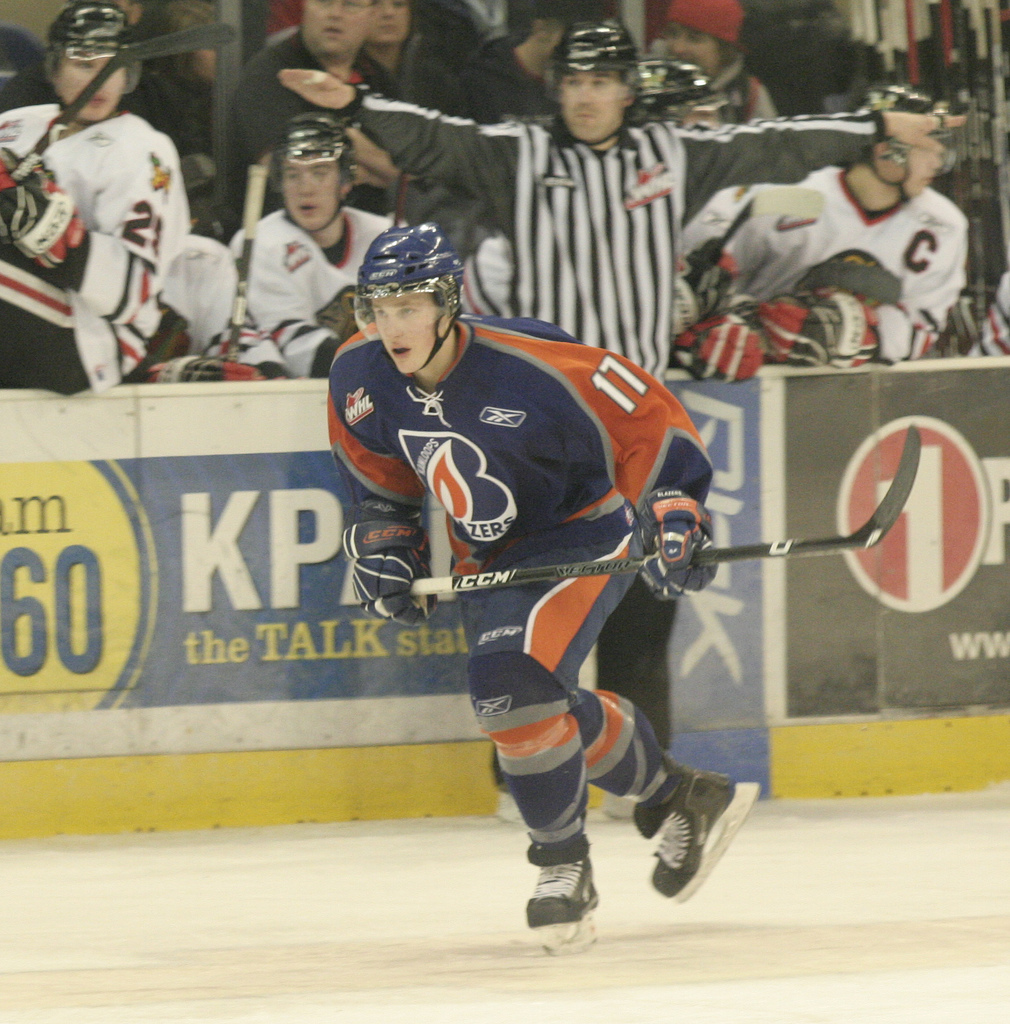
Giffen Nyren played for the Blazers between 2008 and 2010.

Note: GP = Games played, W = Wins, L = Losses, T = Ties, OTL = Overtime losses, SOL = Shootout losses, Pts = Points, GF = Goals for, GA = Goals against

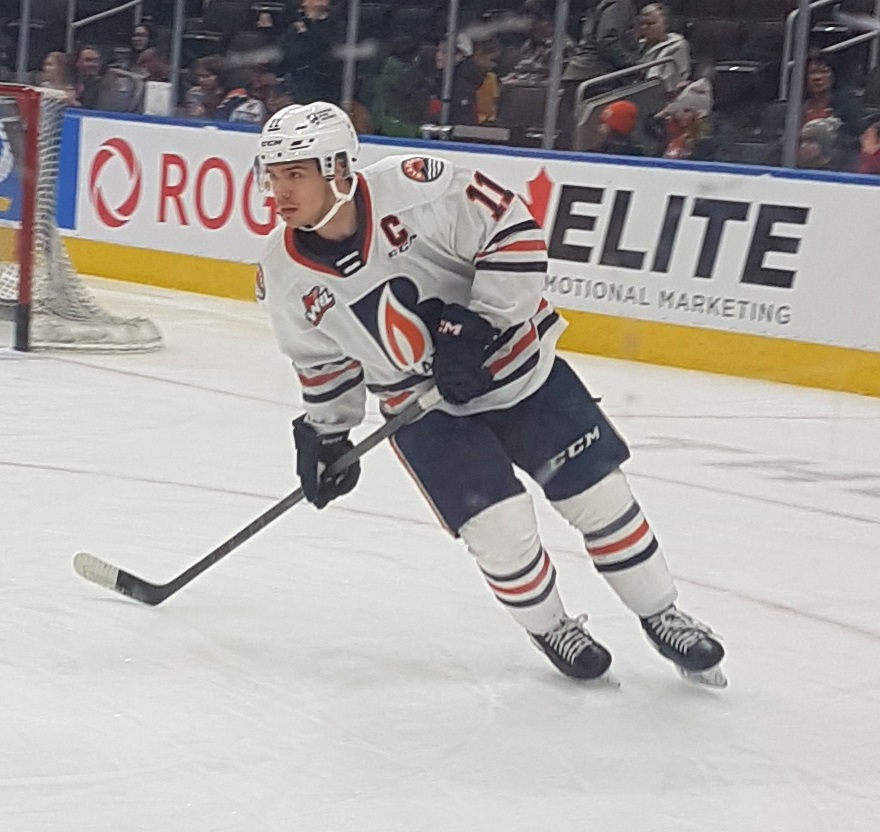
Logan Stankoven served as captain of the Blazers during the 2022–23 season.

Season	GP	W	L	T	OTL	GF	GA	Points	Finish	Playoffs
1981–82	72	18	53	1	–	320	464	37	4th West	Lost West Division semifinal
1982–83	72	46	26	0	–	461	356	92	3rd West	Lost West Division semifinal
1983–84	72	50	22	0	–	467	332	100	1st West	Won Championship
1984–85	72	52	17	2	–	423	293	106	1st West	Lost final
1985–86	72	49	19	4	–	449	299	102	1st West	Won Championship
1986–87	72	55	14	3	–	496	292	113	1st West	Lost West Division final
1987–88	72	45	26	1	–	399	307	91	1st West	Lost final
1988–89	72	34	33	5	–	326	309	73	3rd West	Lost West Division final
1989–90	72	56	16	0	–	484	278	112	1st West	Won Championship
1990–91	72	50	20	2	–	385	247	102	1st West	Lost West Division final
1991–92	72	51	17	4	–	351	226	106	1st West	Won Championship and Memorial Cup
1992–93	72	42	28	2	–	302	253	86	3rd West	Lost West Division final
1993–94	72	50	16	6	–	381	225	106	1st West	Won Championship and Memorial Cup
1994–95	72	52	14	6	–	375	202	110	1st West	Won Championship and Memorial Cup
1995–96	72	48	22	2	–	343	257	98	2nd West	Lost West Division final
1996–97	72	28	37	7	–	256	285	63	5th West	Lost West Division quarterfinal
1997–98	72	37	32	3	–	234	253	77	4th West	Lost West Division quarterfinal
1998–99	72	48	11	13	–	298	195	109	1st West	Lost final
1999–00	72	36	30	5	1	244	228	78	4th West	Lost West Division quarterfinal
2000–01	72	35	28	7	2	289	274	79	3rd West	Lost West Division quarterfinal
2001–02	72	38	25	5	4	263	230	85	1st B.C.	Lost Western Conference quarterfinal
2002–03	72	39	27	5	1	261	222	84	2nd B.C.	Lost Western Conference quarterfinal
2003–04	72	34	28	8	2	192	182	78	3rd B.C.	Lost Western Conference quarterfinal
2004–05	72	26	37	7	2	161	211	61	4th B.C.	Lost Western Conference quarterfinal
Season	GP	W	L	OTL	SOL	GF	GA	Points	Finish	Playoffs
2005–06	72	34	33	2	3	179	196	73	5th B.C.	Did not qualify
2006–07	72	40	26	4	2	245	222	86	2nd B.C.	Lost Western Conference quarterfinal
2007–08	72	27	41	2	2	197	253	58	4th B.C.	Lost Western Conference quarterfinal
2008–09	72	33	33	2	4	242	277	72	3rd B.C.	Lost Western Conference quarterfinal
2009–10	72	32	33	2	5	237	284	71	3rd B.C.	Lost Western Conference quarterfinal
2010–11	72	29	37	3	3	219	285	64	5th B.C.	Did not qualify
2011–12	72	47	20	2	3	290	211	99	1st B.C.	Lost Western Conference semifinal
2012–13	72	47	20	2	3	261	180	99	2nd B.C.	Lost Western Conference final
2013–14	72	14	53	2	3	175	305	33	5th B.C.	Did not qualify
2014–15	72	28	37	4	3	214	258	63	4th B.C.	Did not qualify
2015–16	72	38	25	5	4	237	218	85	3rd B.C.	Lost Western Conference quarterfinal
2016–17	72	42	24	2	4	243	198	90	3rd B.C.	Lost Western Conference quarterfinal
2017–18	72	30	37	1	4	212	237	65	4th B.C.	Did not qualify
2018–19	68	28	32	6	2	196	212	64	3rd B.C.	Lost Western Conference quarterfinal
2019–20	63	41	18	3	1	271	166	86	1st B.C.	Cancelled due to the COVID-19 pandemic
2020–21	22	18	4	0	0	87	51	36	1st B.C.	No playoffs held due to COVID-19 pandemic
2021–22	68	48	17	3	0	287	176	99	1st B.C.	Lost Western Conference final
2022–23	68	48	13	4	3	313	198	103	1st B.C.	Lost Western Conference final
2023–24	68	20	42	3	3	180	295	46	5th B.C.	Did not qualify
2024–25	68	24	39	4	1	206	271	53	4th B.C.	Did not qualify
2025–26	68	31	24	7	6	264	250	75	4th B.C.	Lost Western Conference quarterfinal

== Championship history ==
- Memorial Cup (3): 1992, 1994, 1995
- President's Cup (6): 1983–84, 1985–86, 1989–90, 1991–92, 1993–94, 1994–95
- Scotty Munro Memorial Trophy (7): 1983–84, 1986–87, 1989–90, 1990–91, 1991–92, 1993–94, 1994–95
- Playoff Division titles (9): 1983–84, 1984–85, 1985–86, 1987–88, 1989–90, 1991–92, 1993–94, 1994–95, 1998–99
- Regular season Division titles (17): 1983–84, 1984–85, 1985–86, 1986–87, 1987–88, 1989–90, 1990–91, 1991–92, 1993–94, 1994–95, 1998–99, 2001–02, 2011–12, 2019–20, 2020–21, 2021–22, 2022–23

=== WHL Championships series ===
- 1983–84: Win, 4–3 vs. Regina Pats
- 1984–85: Loss, 0–4 vs. Prince Albert Raiders
- 1985–86: Win, 4–1 vs. Medicine Hat Tigers
- 1987–88: Loss, 2–4 vs. Medicine Hat
- 1989–90: Win, 4–1 vs. Lethbridge Hurricanes
- 1991–92: Win, 4–3 vs. Saskatoon Blades
- 1993–94: Win, 4–3 vs. Saskatoon Blades
- 1994–95: Win, 4–2 vs. Brandon Wheat Kings
- 1998–99: Loss, 1–4 vs. Calgary Hitmen

=== Memorial Cup finals ===
- 1992: Win, 5–4 vs. Sault Ste. Marie Greyhounds
- 1994: Win, 5–3 vs. Laval Titan
- 1995: Win, 8–2 vs. Detroit Junior Red Wings

== Coaches ==
Notable head coaches in the history of the Kamloops Blazers include Ken Hitchcock, Tom Renney, Don Hay, Marc Habscheid, and Dean Evason.

== NHL alumni ==
Totals include those who played for the franchise as the Kamloops Junior Oilers

- Jared Aulin
- Warren Babe
- Rudolfs Balcers
- Len Barrie
- Victor Bartley
- Nolan Baumgartner
- Robin Bawa
- Brian Benning
- Craig Berube
- Doug Bodger
- Zac Boyer
- Mike Brown
- Rob Brown
- Garth Butcher
- Kyle Calder
- Jim Camazzola
- Erik Christensen
- Dave Chyzowski
- Dean Clark
- Ken Daneyko
- Scott Daniels
- Jarrett Deuling
- Rob DiMaio
- Shane Doan
- Hnat Domenichelli
- Devan Dubnyk
- Micki DuPont
- Joel Edmundson
- Keaton Ellerby
- Todd Ewen
- Dean Evason
- Dylan Ferguson
- Scott Ferguson
- Mark Ferner
- Emmitt Finnie
- Steve Gainey
- Marc Habscheid
- Richard Hajdu
- Bruce Holloway
- Greg Hawgood
- Corey Hirsch
- Jason Holland
- Tony Horacek
- Ryan Huska
- Jarome Iginla
- Connor Ingram
- Jonas Johansson
- Ty Jones
- Mark Kachowski
- Matt Kassian
- Doug Kostynski
- Paul Kruse
- Bryce Lampman
- JC Lipon
- Jan Ludvig
- Brad Lukowich
- Ray Macias
- David Mackey
- Pat MacLeod
- Mike MacWilliam
- Dean Malkoc
- Dave Marcinyshyn
- Gord Mark
- Fraser Minten
- Shaone Morrisonn
- Glenn Mulvenna
- Chris Murray
- Tyson Nash
- Mike Needham
- Scott Niedermayer
- Colton Orr
- Steve Passmore
- Ed Patterson
- Garrett Pilon
- Rudy Poeschek
- Gage Quinney
- Brendan Ranford
- Daryl Reaugh
- Mark Recchi
- Robyn Regehr
- Cam Severson
- Ron Shudra
- Trevor Sim
- Rob Skrlac
- Tyler Sloan
- Jiri Smejkal
- Colin Smith
- Geoff Smith
- Logan Stankoven
- Ryan Stewart
- Jason Strudwick
- Darryl Sydor
- Darcy Tucker
- Scottie Upshall
- Kris Versteeg
- Gordie Walker
- David Wilkie
- Connor Zary
- Olen Zellweger

== See also ==
- List of ice hockey teams in British Columbia
