= Tyson Nash =

Canadian former ice hockey left winger (born 1975)

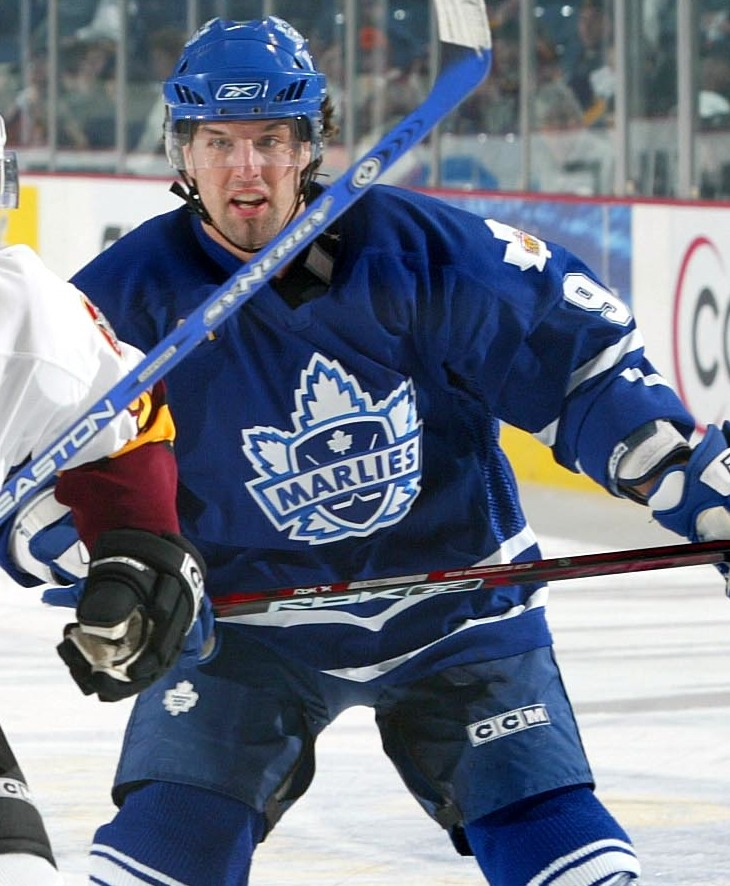
- Nash with the Toronto Marlies in 2007
- Born: March 11, 1975 (age 51) Edmonton, Alberta, Canada
- Height: 5 ft 11 in (180 cm)
- Weight: 191 lb (87 kg; 13 st 9 lb)
- Position: Left wing
- Shot: Left
- Played for: St. Louis Blues; Phoenix Coyotes; Nippon Paper Cranes
- NHL draft: 247th overall, 1994; Vancouver Canucks
- Playing career: 1995–2008

Tyson Scott Nash (born March 11, 1975) is a Canadian former ice hockey left winger. He announced his retirement on September 11, 2008. He last played for the Nippon Paper Cranes in Japan during the 2007–08 season.

== Hockey ==
Nash spent his first five seasons in the NHL with the St. Louis Blues, in his early years, in the role of a pest, specializing in drawing penalties from members of opposing teams. He spent the next two seasons with the Phoenix Coyotes. He was traded to the Toronto Maple Leafs from the Coyotes for Mikael Tellqvist and a 4th round draft pick on November 28, 2006.

On November 22, 2007, he signed with the Nippon Paper Cranes in Japan. The Cranes finished the season in second place, behind the Oji Eagles.

He played his junior career with the Kamloops Blazers where he was part of the team which won three Memorial Cups. He is one of only three players to have won three Memorial Cups with the same team (Ryan Huska and Darcy Tucker are the others).

Nash was hired as the Arizona Coyotes' TV analyst alongside Matt McConnell following his retirement. Nash came under fire when he applauded the one-sided assault of an Anaheim Ducks player with his gloves still on during a 5–0 Coyotes loss on April 1, 2022.

== Career statistics ==
			Regular season					Playoffs
Season	Team	League	GP	G	A	Pts	PIM	GP	G	A	Pts	PIM
1990–91	Kamloops Blazers	WHL	3	0	0	0	0	—	—	—	—	—
1991–92	Kamloops Blazers	WHL	33	1	6	7	62	4	0	0	0	0
1992–93	Kamloops Blazers	WHL	61	10	16	26	78	13	3	2	5	32
1993–94	Kamloops Blazers	WHL	65	20	38	58	135	16	3	4	7	12
1994–95	Kamloops Blazers	WHL	63	34	41	75	70	21	10	7	17	30
1995–96	Raleigh Icecaps	ECHL	6	1	1	2	8	—	—	—	—	—
1995–96	Syracuse Crunch	AHL	50	4	7	11	58	4	0	0	0	11
1996–97	Syracuse Crunch	AHL	77	17	17	34	105	3	0	2	2	0
1997–98	Syracuse Crunch	AHL	74	20	20	40	184	5	0	2	2	28
1998–99	St. Louis Blues	NHL	2	0	0	0	5	1	0	0	0	2
1998–99	Worcester IceCats	AHL	55	14	22	36	143	4	4	1	5	27
1999–00	St. Louis Blues	NHL	66	4	9	13	150	6	1	0	1	24
2000–01	St. Louis Blues	NHL	57	8	7	15	110	—	—	—	—	—
2001–02	St. Louis Blues	NHL	64	6	7	13	100	9	0	1	1	2
2002–03	St. Louis Blues	NHL	66	6	3	9	114	7	2	1	3	6
2003–04	Phoenix Coyotes	NHL	69	3	5	8	110	—	—	—	—	—
2005–06	Phoenix Coyotes	NHL	50	0	6	6	84	—	—	—	—	—
2006–07	San Antonio Rampage	AHL	19	6	6	12	48	—	—	—	—	—
2006–07	Toronto Marlies	AHL	54	10	13	23	134	—	—	—	—	—
2007–08	Nippon Paper Cranes	ALIH	5	1	0	1	16	9	1	3	4	43
NHL totals			374	27	37	64	673	23	3	2	5	52
AHL totals			329	71	85	156	672	16	4	5	9	66
