= Colin Miller (ice hockey, born 1971) =

Canadian ice hockey player

- Born: August 21, 1971 (age 53); Grimsby, Ontario, Canada
- Height: 6 ft 0 in (183 cm)
- Weight: 200 lb (91 kg; 14 st 4 lb)
- Position: Centre
- Shot: Right
- Played for: Atlanta Knights; Dayton Bombers
- Playing career: 1992–1999

Colin Miller (born August 21, 1971) is a Canadian retired professional ice hockey player. He played 276 games in the International Hockey League, primarily with the Atlanta Knights, and 213 games in the ECHL, mostly with the Dayton Bombers.

== Early life ==
Miller was born August 21, 1971, in Grimsby, Ontario.

== Playing career ==
Miller began playing junior ice hockey with the Grimsby Peach Kings in the 1986–87 season, followed by 36 goals for the Kanata Valley Lasers in the 1987–88 season. In 1988, he was drafted into the Ontario Hockey League, 30th overall, by the Toronto Marlboros. He scored 32 goals for the Niagara Falls Thunder in the 1988–89 OHL season and was traded to the Sault Ste. Marie Greyhounds during the 1989–90 OHL season. Miller played in the 1991 Memorial Cup and 1992 Memorial Cup with the Greyhounds. In the 1992 tournament, he was awarded the George Parsons Trophy as the most sportsmanlike player and named to the Memorial Cup All-Star Team. In four OHL seasons, he scored 123 goals, 222 assists, and 345 points.

Miller began playing professionally with Atlanta in the 1992–93 IHL season and won the Turner Cup in the 1993–94 IHL season with the Knights. In the following season, he played with four teams, including Atlanta, the Knoxville Cherokees, the Las Vegas Thunder, and the Indianapolis Ice. Miller joined the Dayton Bombers in the 1995–96 ECHL season and remained there for four seasons until the 1998–99 ECHL season, except for a one-game call-up in the 1996–97 season with Michigan K-Wings. Miller was the centerman on the Bombers top line each season, playing 271 games, and scoring 83 goals, 192 assists, and 275 points with Dayton.

== Later career ==
After playing, Miller spent time as the head coach of University of Dayton club hockey team. He was inducted into the Dayton Hockey Hall of Fame in 2004. The Bombers hired Miller as an assistant coach for the 2005–06 ECHL season. Miller has also worked as a golf professional at the Miami Valley Golf Club.

== Career statistics ==
Career regular season and playoffs statistics.

			Regular season					Playoffs
Season	Team	League	GP	G	A	Pts	PIM	GP	G	A	Pts	PIM
1986–87	Grimsby Peach Kings	GHL	31	14	19	33	8	—	—	—	—	—
1987–88	Kanata Valley Lasers	CJHL	53	36	48	84	70	—	—	—	—	—
1988–89	Niagara Falls Thunder	OHL	62	32	48	80	46	17	2	5	7	2
1989–90	Niagara Falls Thunder	OHL	14	3	5	8	6	—	—	—	—	—
1989–90	Sault Ste. Marie Greyhounds	OHL	44	25	46	71	33	—	—	—	—	—
1990–91	Sault Ste. Marie Greyhounds	OHL	62	26	60	86	35	14	4	18	22	17
1991–92	Sault Ste. Marie Greyhounds	OHL	66	37	73	110	52	19	10	23	33	18
1992–93	Atlanta Knights	IHL	76	20	39	59	52	9	2	4	6	22
1993–94	Atlanta Knights	IHL	80	13	32	45	48	3	2	3	5	0
1994–95	Las Vegas Thunder	IHL	7	0	1	1	2	—	—	—	—	—
1994–95	Atlanta Knights	IHL	36	5	14	19	29	—	—	—	—	—
1994–95	Indianapolis Ice	IHL	13	5	6	11	10	—	—	—	—	—
1994–95	Knoxville Cherokees	ECHL	5	1	2	3	0	—	—	—	—	—
1995–96	Dayton Bombers	ECHL	69	24	50	74	103	3	0	2	2	8
1996–97	Dayton Bombers	ECHL	68	20	58	78	60	4	2	2	4	18
1996–97	Michigan K-Wings	IHL	1	0	0	0	0	—	—	—	—	—
1997–98	Dayton Bombers	ECHL	66	19	48	67	144	5	0	2	2	12
1998–99	Dayton Bombers	ECHL	68	20	36	56	126	4	0	1	1	16
ECHL totals			276	84	194	278	433	16	2	7	9	54
IHL totals			213	43	92	135	141	12	4	7	11	22
