= Mike Kennedy (ice hockey, born 1972) =

Canadian ice hockey player

- Born: April 13, 1972 (age 54) Toronto, Ontario, Canada
- Height: 6 ft 1 in (185 cm)
- Weight: 200 lb (91 kg; 14 st 4 lb)
- Position: Centre
- Shot: Right
- Played for: Dallas Stars; Toronto Maple Leafs; New York Islanders; München Barons; Adler Mannheim; Iserlohn Roosters
- NHL draft: 97th overall, 1991; Minnesota North Stars
- Playing career: 1992–2007

Michael Kennedy (born April 13, 1972) is a Canadian former professional ice hockey centre who played 145 games in the National Hockey League for the Dallas Stars, Toronto Maple Leafs and New York Islanders from 1995 to 1999.

== Career ==
Kennedy was drafted 97th overall by the Minnesota North Stars in the 1991 NHL entry draft. He played 152 career NHL games, scoring 16 goals and 36 assists for a total of 52 points.

From 1999 to 2005, Kennedy played in the Deutsche Eishockey Liga in Germany.

In 2000, he helped the Munich Barons win the championship.

Kennedy worked as the head coach of the Yokohama Grits of the Asia League Ice Hockey.

== Career statistics ==
=== Regular season and playoffs ===
			Regular season					Playoffs
Season	Team	League	GP	G	A	Pts	PIM	GP	G	A	Pts	PIM
1989–90	University of British Columbia	CIAU	9	5	7	12	0	—	—	—	—	—
1990–91	University of British Columbia	CIAU	28	17	17	34	18	—	—	—	—	—
1991–92	Seattle Thunderbirds	WHL	71	42	47	89	134	15	11	6	17	20
1991–92	Seattle Thunderbirds	M-Cup	—	—	—	—	—	4	1	2	3	4
1992–93	Kalamazoo Wings	IHL	77	21	30	51	39	—	—	—	—	—
1993–94	Kalamazoo Wings	IHL	63	20	18	38	42	3	1	2	3	2
1994–95	Dallas Stars	NHL	44	6	12	18	33	5	0	0	0	9
1994–95	Kalamazoo Wings	IHL	42	20	28	48	29	—	—	—	—	—
1995–96	Dallas Stars	NHL	61	9	17	26	48	—	—	—	—	—
1996–97	Dallas Stars	NHL	24	1	6	7	13	—	—	—	—	—
1996–97	Michigan K-Wings	IHL	2	0	1	1	2	—	—	—	—	—
1997–98	Toronto Maple Leafs	NHL	13	0	1	1	14	—	—	—	—	—
1997–98	Dallas Stars	NHL	2	0	0	0	2	—	—	—	—	—
1997–98	St. John's Maple Leafs	AHL	49	11	17	28	86	—	—	—	—	—
1998–99	New York Islanders	NHL	1	0	0	0	2	—	—	—	—	—
1998–99	Lowell Lock Monsters	AHL	62	14	26	40	52	3	1	0	1	2
1999–00	München Barons	DEL	13	2	5	7	6	12	4	4	8	28
2000–01	München Barons	DEL	44	14	17	31	67	11	5	5	10	12
2001–02	München Barons	DEL	56	19	20	39	79	9	3	7	10	8
2002–03	Adler Mannheim	DEL	48	14	17	31	49	8	0	5	5	0
2003–04	Adler Mannheim	DEL	48	12	15	27	38	6	1	1	2	29
2004–05	Leksands IF	SWE-2	19	9	7	16	41	—	—	—	—	—
2004–05	Iserlohn Roosters	DEL	13	4	3	7	28	—	—	—	—	—
2005–06	Dundas Real McCoys	MLH	27	17	16	33	44	6	0	0	0	18
2006–07	Dundas Real McCoys	MLH	18	19	12	31	54	—	—	—	—	—
2007–08	Dundas Real McCoys	MLH	26	19	28	47	26	10	3	7	10	16
2007–08	Dundas Real McCoys	Al-Cup	—	—	—	—	—	3	1	1	2	8
2008–09	Dundas Real McCoys	MLH	21	12	19	31	46	9	4	6	10	12
2008–09	Dundas Real McCoys	Al-Cup	—	—	—	—	—	3	0	3	3	8
2009–10	Dundas Real McCoys	MLH	16	9	19	28	22	12	6	6	12	8
2010–11	Dundas Real McCoys	MLH	6	2	5	7	2	11	7	9	6	14
2010–11	Dundas Real McCoys	Al-Cup]]	—	—	—	—	—	4	1	3	4	4
2011–12	Dundas Real McCoys	ACH	6	3	8	11	2	8	2	4	6	24
DEL totals			222	65	77	142	267	46	13	22	35	77
NHL totals			145	16	36	52	112	3	1	2	3	2

== Awards ==
- WHL West Second All-Star Team – 1992
