= David Wilkie (ice hockey) =

American ice hockey player (born 1974)

- Born: May 30, 1974 (age 52) Ellensburg, Washington, U.S.
- Height: 6 ft 3 in (191 cm)
- Weight: 215 lb (98 kg; 15 st 5 lb)
- Position: Defense
- Shot: Right
- Played for: Montreal Canadiens; Tampa Bay Lightning; New York Rangers
- National team: United States
- NHL draft: 20th overall, 1992; Montreal Canadiens
- Playing career: 1994–2002

David John Wilkie (born May 30, 1974) is an American former professional ice hockey player who played in the National Hockey League (NHL) with the Montreal Canadiens, Tampa Bay Lightning, and New York Rangers. He played defense and shot right-handed.

== Playing career ==
After a successful season with the Kamloops Blazers of the Western Hockey League, Wilkie was seen as one of the top upcoming defensive prospects for the 1992 NHL entry draft and was selected in the 1st round, 20th overall, by the Montreal Canadiens. The following season, Wilkie returned to the Blazers and made his international debut representing the United States in the 1993 World Junior Ice Hockey Championship (WJC). The 1993–94 season saw Wilkie split the year between the Blazers and Regina Pats while also returning to the WJC for 1994.

For the 1994–95 season, Wilkie made his professional debut and played the majority of the year with the Fredericton Canadiens of the American Hockey League (AHL) while also making his NHL debut, appearing in one game with Montreal. The following season, he split time with Fredericton and Montreal, appearing in 23 and 24 games respectively. The 1996–97 season saw Wilkie make the Montreal Canadiens full-time, appearing in 61 games and scoring 15 points, both NHL career highs.

The 1997–98 season saw Wilkie play five games with the Canadiens before being traded to the Tampa Bay Lightning. Injuries would hamper Wilkie in his time with the Lightning. He played in 29 games with the Lightning during the 1997–98 season and only 46 for the 1998–99 season. The following season, Wilkie signed with the New York Rangers, but ended up playing the majority of the time in the minors. He played the majority of two seasons with the Houston Aeros, appearing in one game with the Hartford Wolf Pack during the 1999–2000 season and one game with the Rangers during the 2000–01 season.

For the 2001–02 season, Wilkie signed with the Augusta Lynx of the ECHL as a player-coach. After one season with the Lynx, Wilkie retired as a player in 2002.

== Coaching career ==
Following his player-coach stint, Wilkie returned for the 2002–03 as an assistant coach for the Augusta Lynx. Midway through the season he replaced the head coach and finished the year as the head coach of the team, leading them to a 24–32–6 record. After this he went on to coach the Omaha Gladiators Bantam AA (majors) and led them to a third-place finish at Nationals.

Wilkie led the Omaha Jr. Lancers U16 to the National Championship Game at the 2008 USA Hockey Nationals in Buffalo, New York; placing second and finished the season with a 40–23–5 record. In the 2009–10 season, he head coached the Omaha Jr. Lancers U18 to the 2010 USA Hockey Nationals in Rochester, NY, where they finished second and finished the season with a 28–28–5 record. Has also coached PeeWee AA teams, Squirt AA teams, and also coaches the Omaha Tropics summer hockey team. He has also served as the volunteer assistant coach to the University of Nebraska at Omaha Mavericks, a Division I hockey school. Wilkie was the head coach of the Omaha AAA Hockey Club that competes in the North American Prospects Hockey League.

In 2017, Wilkie was hired as the head coach and general manager of the Omaha Lancers in the United States Hockey League. He left the Lancers to pursue other opportunities in 2021 after compiling a 123–78–24 record.

== Personal life ==
Wilkie is married to Carrie Anne. They have a blended family of seven children together.

== Career statistics ==
=== Regular season and playoffs ===
| | | | Regular season | | | | | Playoffs |
| Season | Team | League | GP | G | A | Pts | PIM | GP | G | A | Pts | PIM |
|---|---|---|---|---|---|---|---|---|---|---|---|---|
| 1989–90 | Seattle NW Americans | PIJHL | 41 | 21 | 27 | 48 | 59 | — | — | — | — | — |
| 1990–91 | Omaha Lancers | USHL | 19 | 2 | 2 | 4 | 18 | — | — | — | — | — |
| 1990–91 | Seattle Thunderbirds | WHL | 25 | 1 | 1 | 2 | 22 | — | — | — | — | — |
| 1991–92 | Kamloops Blazers | WHL | 71 | 12 | 28 | 40 | 153 | 16 | 6 | 5 | 11 | 19 |
| 1992–93 | Kamloops Blazers | WHL | 53 | 11 | 26 | 37 | 109 | 6 | 4 | 2 | 6 | 2 |
| 1993–94 | Kamloops Blazers | WHL | 27 | 11 | 18 | 29 | 18 | — | — | — | — | — |
| 1993–94 | Regina Pats | WHL | 29 | 27 | 21 | 48 | 16 | 4 | 1 | 4 | 5 | 4 |
| 1994–95 | Fredericton Canadiens | AHL | 70 | 10 | 43 | 53 | 34 | 1 | 0 | 0 | 0 | 0 |
| 1994–95 | Montreal Canadiens | NHL | 1 | 0 | 0 | 0 | 0 | — | — | — | — | — |
| 1995–96 | Fredericton Canadiens | AHL | 23 | 5 | 12 | 17 | 20 | — | — | — | — | — |
| 1995–96 | Montreal Canadiens | NHL | 24 | 1 | 5 | 6 | 10 | 6 | 1 | 2 | 3 | 12 |
| 1996–97 | Montreal Canadiens | NHL | 61 | 6 | 9 | 15 | 63 | 2 | 0 | 0 | 0 | 2 |
| 1997–98 | Montreal Canadiens | NHL | 5 | 1 | 0 | 1 | 4 | — | — | — | — | — |
| 1997–98 | Tampa Bay Lightning | NHL | 29 | 1 | 5 | 6 | 17 | — | — | — | — | — |
| 1998–99 | Cleveland Lumberjacks | IHL | 2 | 0 | 2 | 2 | 0 | — | — | — | — | — |
| 1998–99 | Tampa Bay Lightning | NHL | 46 | 1 | 7 | 8 | 69 | — | — | — | — | — |
| 1999–00 | Houston Aeros | IHL | 57 | 4 | 24 | 28 | 71 | 11 | 1 | 8 | 9 | 10 |
| 1999–00 | Hartford Wolf Pack | AHL | 1 | 0 | 2 | 2 | 0 | — | — | — | — | — |
| 2000–01 | Houston Aeros | IHL | 49 | 8 | 11 | 19 | 29 | 7 | 1 | 1 | 2 | 4 |
| 2000–01 | New York Rangers | NHL | 1 | 0 | 0 | 0 | 2 | — | — | — | — | — |
| 2001–02 | Augusta Lynx | ECHL | 72 | 11 | 34 | 45 | 86 | — | — | — | — | — |
| AHL totals | | | 94 | 15 | 57 | 72 | 54 | 1 | 0 | 0 | 0 | 0 |
| NHL totals | | | 167 | 10 | 26 | 36 | 165 | 8 | 1 | 2 | 3 | 14 |
| IHL totals | | | 108 | 12 | 37 | 49 | 100 | 18 | 2 | 9 | 11 | 14 |

=== International ===
| Year | Team | Event | Result | GP | G | A | Pts | PIM |
|---|---|---|---|---|---|---|---|---|
| 1993 | United States | WJC | 4th | 7 | 0 | 2 | 2 | 2 |
| 1994 | United States | WJC | 6th | 6 | 2 | 1 | 3 | 0 |
| Junior totals | | | | 13 | 2 | 3 | 5 | 2 |

| Preceded by Brent Bilodeau | Montreal Canadiens first-round draft pick 1992 | Succeeded by Saku Koivu |
