= Scott Niedermayer =

Canadian ice hockey player (born 1973)

- Hockey Hall of Fame, 2013
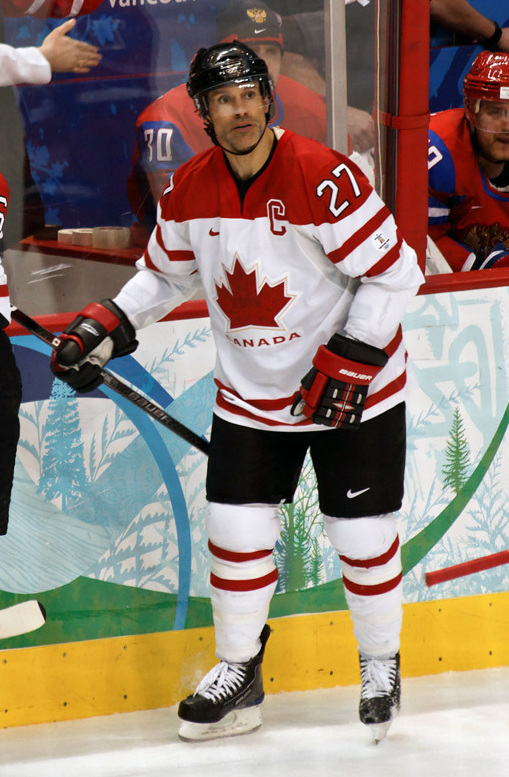
- Niedermayer with Canada in 2010
- Born: August 31, 1973 (age 53) Edmonton, Alberta, Canada
- Height: 6 ft 1 in (185 cm)
- Weight: 200 lb (91 kg; 14 st 4 lb)
- Position: Defence
- Shot: Left
- Played for: New Jersey Devils; Anaheim Ducks
- National team: Canada
- NHL draft: 3rd overall, 1991; New Jersey Devils
- Playing career: 1991–2010
Medal record
Representing Canada
Men's ice hockey
Olympic Games
Gold medal – first place	2002 Salt Lake City
Gold medal – first place	2010 Vancouver
World Championships
Gold medal – first place	2004 Czech Republic
World Cup
Gold medal – first place	2004 World Cup of Hockey
Silver medal – second place	1996 World Cup of Hockey
World Junior Championships
Gold medal – first place	1991 Canada

Scott Niedermayer (born August 31, 1973) is a Canadian former ice hockey player and current special assignment coach of the Anaheim Ducks. A defenceman, he played 18 seasons and over 1,000 games in the National Hockey League (NHL) for the New Jersey Devils and Anaheim Ducks. Niedermayer is a four-time Stanley Cup champion and played in five NHL All-Star Games. He won the James Norris Memorial Trophy in 2003–04 as the NHL's top defenceman and the Conn Smythe Trophy in 2007 as the most valuable player of the playoffs. In 2017, Niedermayer was named one of the 100 Greatest NHL Players in history.

As a junior, Niedermayer was a member of a Kamloops Blazers team that won two Western Hockey League championships and was voted the most valuable player of the 1992 Memorial Cup, leading the Blazers to the Canadian Hockey League championship. The third overall selection at the 1991 NHL entry draft by New Jersey, Niedermayer played the majority of his professional career with the Devils before moving to Anaheim in 2005.

Internationally, Niedermayer played with Team Canada on several occasions. He is a member of the Triple Gold Club, having won the Stanley Cup as well as a World Championship (2004) and Olympic gold medals (2002, 2010). Niedermayer also played for the Memorial Cup champions, and championship teams at the 1991 World Junior Championships and the 2004 World Cup of Hockey, making him and Corey Perry the only players in history to have ever won each of the six major North American and international competitions available to players. He was introduced in to the IIHF All-Time Canada Team in 2020.

Regarded as one of the greatest defencemen in NHL history, Niedermayer has earned numerous accolades throughout his career. He was inducted into Canada's Sports Hall of Fame in 2012, into the Hockey Hall of Fame in November 2013, and into the IIHF Hall of Fame in 2015. The New Jersey Devils, Anaheim Ducks, and Kamloops Blazers have all retired his uniform number.

== Early life ==
Niedermayer was born in Edmonton, Alberta, but spent the first three years of his life in Cassiar, British Columbia before his family settled in Cranbrook, British Columbia. His father, Bob, was a doctor in Cassiar and then Cranbrook, and his mother Carol was a teacher. He has a younger brother, Rob.

Scott and his brother were inseparable when they were younger and often played hockey together. While their father was often their team doctor, their mother taught them to skate. She enrolled them in figure skating to aid their skills development and taught power skating classes in Cranbrook in exchange for ice time for her sons. An offensive defenceman, Scott led his Cranbrook midget team in scoring with 55 goals and 92 points in 1988–89.

== Playing career ==
=== Junior ===
Niedermayer played three seasons of junior hockey with the Kamloops Blazers of the Western Hockey League (WHL) between 1989 and 1992. He recorded 69 points in 64 games in his first season, 1989–90, and helped the Blazers win the President's Cup as WHL champions. The Blazers advanced to the 1990 Memorial Cup as the top ranked team in Canada, but disappointed in the tournament by losing all three games. Niedermayer earned several accolades in 1990–91. He scored 26 goals and 82 points in 57 games to earn a place on the Western Conference All-Star team. Additionally, he was named the recipient of the Daryl K. (Doc) Seaman Trophy as the WHL's scholastic player of the year and won the Canadian Hockey League Scholastic Player of the Year award.

A top prospect for the 1991 NHL entry draft, Niedermayer was selected in the first round, third overall, by the New Jersey Devils. He began the 1991–92 season with New Jersey as the team wanted him to experience the NHL before being returned to Kamloops. After sitting out the Devils first five games, Niedermayer made his NHL debut on October 16, 1991, against the New York Rangers. He appeared in four games with the Devils, recording one assist, before he was sent back to junior. Though he appeared in only 35 games in the 1991–92 WHL season, Niedermayer's 39 points were enough to earn him a second berth on the West All-Star team. After losing in the Western Conference Final the previous season, the Blazers rebounded to win their second WHL championship in three years in 1992. Niedermayer tied for third place in playoff scoring with 23 points. At the 1992 Memorial Cup, he scored seven points in five games to lead the Blazers to the national championship. He was voted the recipient of the Stafford Smythe Memorial Trophy as the most valuable player of the Memorial Cup.

=== New Jersey Devils ===
Niedermayer joined the Devils full-time in 1992–93. He scored his first NHL goal on November 8, 1992, against goaltender Brian Hayward in a 6–1 victory over the San Jose Sharks. Overall, Niedermayer appeared in 80 games, scoring 11 goals and 40 points and was named to the NHL All-Rookie Team on defence. Niedermayer improved to 48 points in 1993–94, and added 4 points in 20 playoff games as the Devils reached the Eastern Conference Final against the New York Rangers, a series they lost in seven games. The Devils made another long playoff run in the lockout-shortened 1994–95 season, reaching the Stanley Cup Final for the first time in franchise history. Niedermayer scored 11 points in 20 playoff games, including a key goal in game two of the Final as the Devils won the Stanley Cup with a four-game sweep of the Detroit Red Wings.

A 33-point season followed for Niedermayer in 1995–96, but the Devils became the first defending champion in 26 years to miss the playoffs. After a 35-point season in 1996–97, Niedermayer's best statistical season in New Jersey came in 1997–98 with a 14-goal, 57-point campaign. He played in his first NHL All-Star Game, scoring a goal, and was named to the NHL's Second All-Star team at the season's end. After finishing second in league scoring amongst defencemen, despite playing in New Jersey's stifling defensive system that suppresses offence, Niedermayer demanded a significant raise. He rejected an offer that would have paid him a base salary of $3.25 million and, unable to come to terms before the start of the 1998–99 season, began the year as a holdout. As the dispute dragged into the season, he joined the Utah Grizzlies of the International Hockey League (IHL). After missing the first month of the NHL season, Niedermayer and the Devils finally agreed to a multi-year contract, the terms of which were not released. He appeared in 71 games with the Devils that season, recording 46 points.

Late in the 1999–2000 season, Niedermayer was involved in a violent incident with Peter Worell of the Florida Panthers. After being elbowed by Worell, Niedermayer responded by swinging his stick at his opponent's head. Worell suffered a concussion and missed six games, while Niedermayer was suspended for ten games – nine in the regular season, and New Jersey's first playoff game. After returning from his ban, Niedermayer's steady defensive contributions in the playoffs helped the Devils win their second Stanley Cup by defeating the Dallas Stars in six games in the 2000 Stanley Cup Final. While celebrating his day with the Cup, Niedermayer took the trophy to Fisher Peak, overlooking his hometown of Cranbrook and was famously pictured hoisting it over his head.

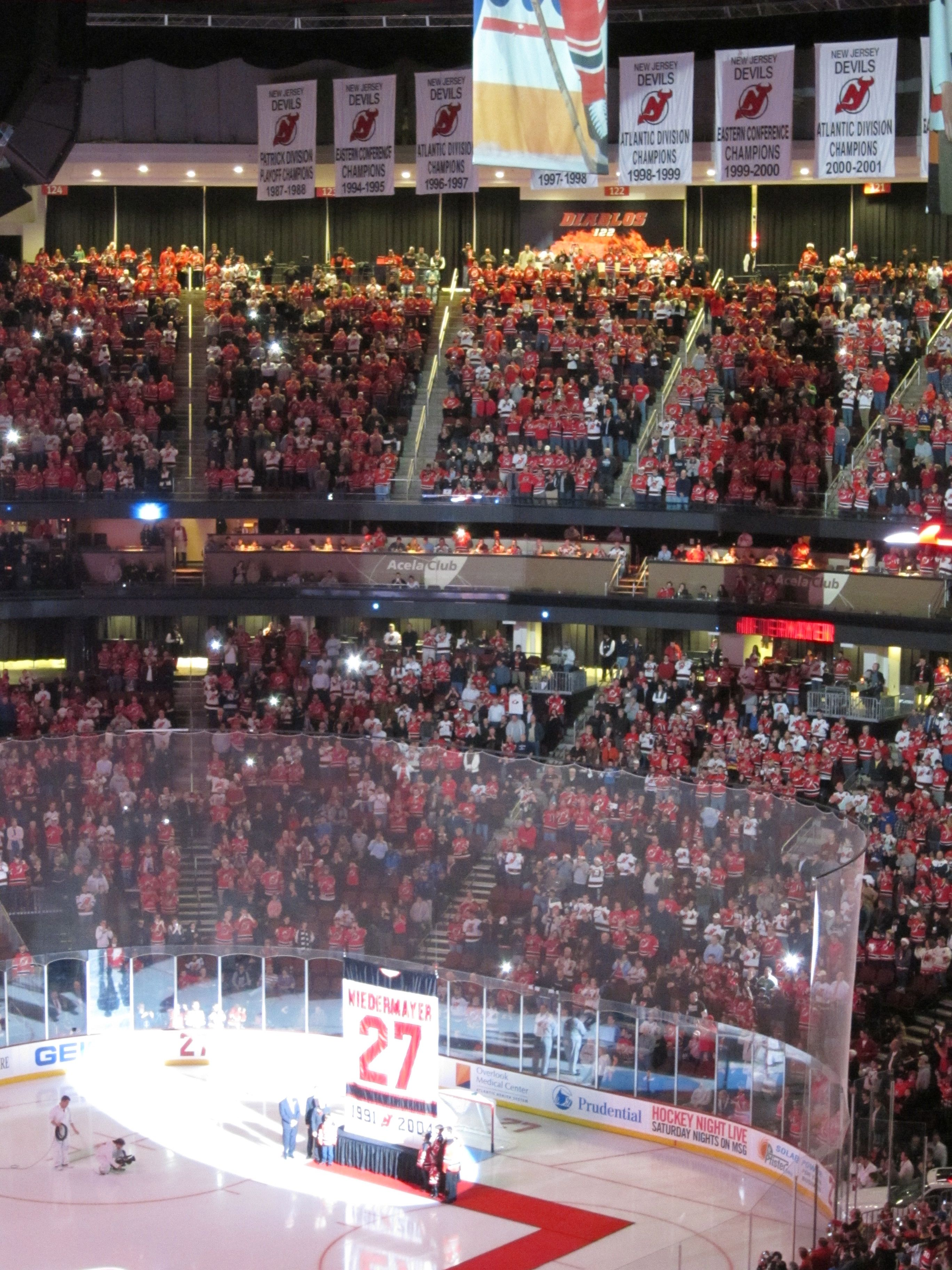
The Devils recognized Niedermayer's contributions to their franchise by retiring his uniform number 27 in 2011.

The expiration of his contract following the season resulted in another lengthy dispute with the Devils. While he wanted a contract similar to the $5.3 million per season average the top ten paid defencemen in the league made, the Devils offered a deal with a base salary of $3.5 million. He was again a holdout at the start of the 2000–01 season, and missed nearly two months of play before finally agreeing to a four-year, $16 million contract. Niedermayer recorded 35 points in 57 games and played in his second All-Star Game. Late in game four of New Jersey's first round playoff series against the Toronto Maple Leafs, Niedermayer was knocked unconscious by a vicious elbow from Toronto's Tie Domi. Niedermayer later claimed that Domi had threatened to retaliate against him over a previous hit earlier in the series. Domi apologized for the incident, calling it a "stupid reaction", but was suspended for the remainder of the 2001 Stanley Cup playoffs. New Jersey reached the 2001 Stanley Cup Final, but lost the series to the Colorado Avalanche in seven games.

Niedermayer missed several games early in the 2001–02 season due to back pain, and his 33 points on the season was his lowest in six seasons. Niedermayer and the Devils reached their fourth Stanley Cup Final in 2002–03. The series was a family affair, as Scott's brother Rob was a member of the opposing Mighty Ducks of Anaheim. When asked, their mother admitted she was hoping Rob's Mighty Ducks would win as Scott already had two championships to his name. Scott dashed his brother and mother's hopes, recording two assists in the deciding seventh game to lead the Devils to a 3–0 victory, and win his third Stanley Cup.

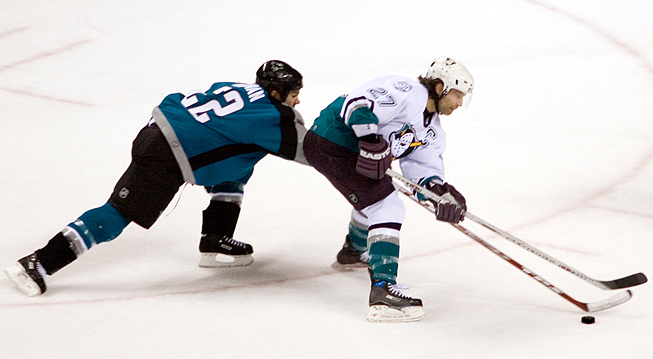
Niedermayer battles for the puck with Scott Hannan of the San Jose Sharks in his first season in Anaheim.

Niedermayer cemented his reputation as an elite NHL defenceman in 2003–04, earning praise from both teammates and opponents for his play throughout the season. Injuries to fellow defencemen Scott Stevens and Brian Rafalski resulted in Niedermayer averaging over 25 minutes of ice time per game, sometimes topping 30, and he temporarily inherited the Devils' captaincy from Stevens. Offensively, Niedermayer posted his second career 50-point season, finishing with 14 goals and 40 assists. He played in his third All-Star Game and was named a First Team All-Star for the first time. After finishing second in league scoring amongst defencemen, recording a plus-minus rating of +20 and leading the Devils to a modern NHL record low 164 goals against, Niedermayer was voted the winner of the James Norris Memorial Trophy as the league's top defenceman.

Upon the expiration of his previous contract, Niedermayer was again a restricted free agent, and he again endured a difficult negotiation with the Devils, even after he changed agents. Initially demanding a five-year, $45 million contract, Niedermayer chose to go to arbitration. He was awarded a one-year contract for the 2004–05 season, and the $7 million salary he was given tied John LeClair's award in 2000 as the highest ever given in arbitration. However, the contract was wiped out when the entire season was cancelled as a result of the 2004–05 NHL lockout.

=== Anaheim Ducks ===
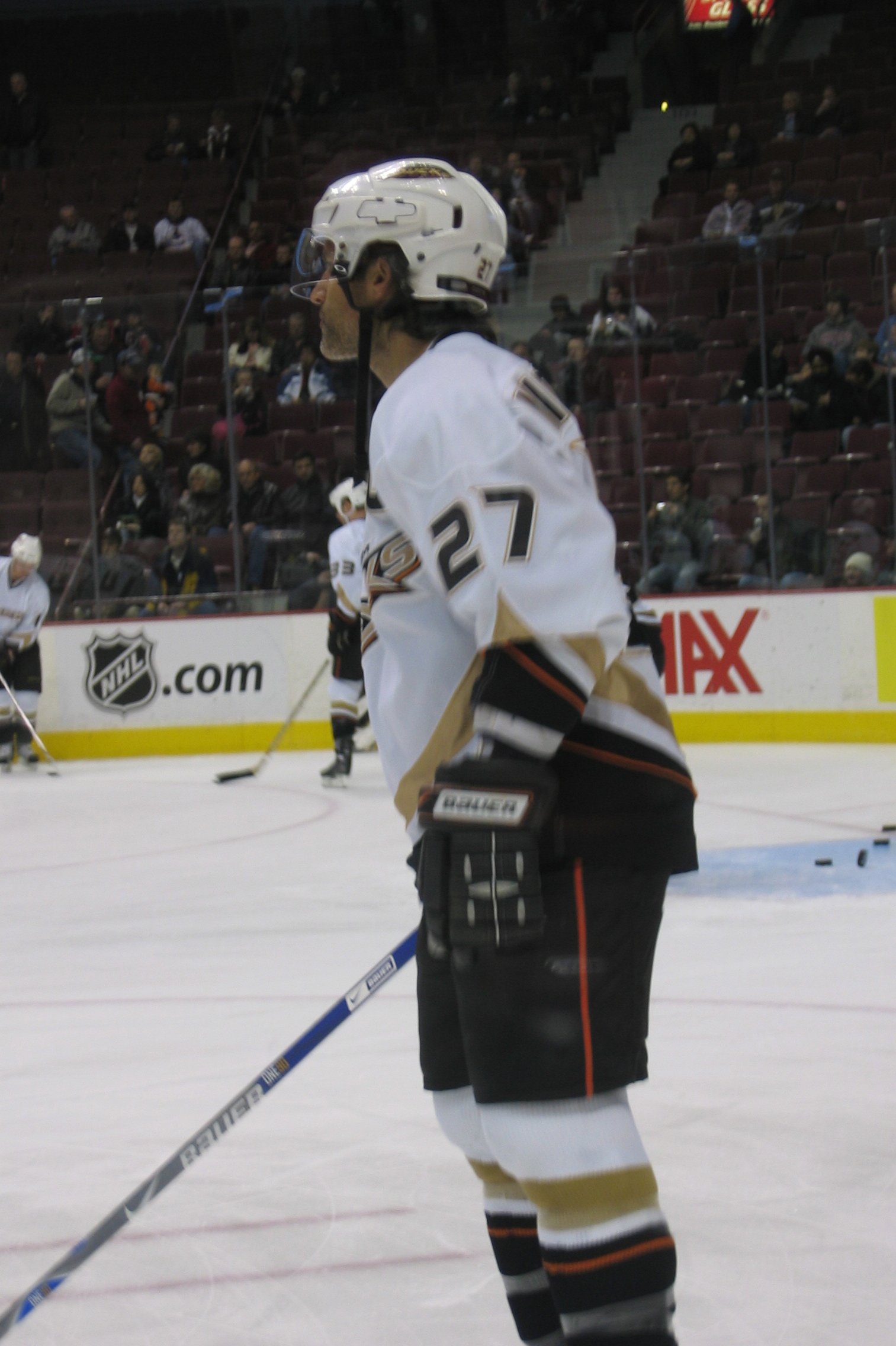
Niedermayer with the Ducks in 2006

As an unrestricted free agent in the summer of 2005, Niedermayer was in considerable demand; 14 teams contacted his agent on the first day they were allowed to talk to him. The Devils offered him a five-year contract that would have paid him $7.8 million per season, the maximum allowed under the new salary cap, but Niedermayer chose instead to sign a four-year contract worth $6.75 million per season with the Mighty Ducks of Anaheim. He chose to take the shorter term and lower salary to play and try to win a Stanley Cup with his brother. The Ducks immediately named Scott the team's captain. In his first season in Anaheim, 2005–06, Niedermayer scored 63 points and was named a First Team All-Star for the second time. In the playoffs, the Ducks reached the Western Conference Final, but were eliminated by the Edmonton Oilers.

Joined on Anaheim's blueline by Chris Pronger, Niedermayer helped the Ducks set franchise records in 2006–07 for most wins (48) and points (110). Both were named finalists for the Norris Trophy, but lost to Detroit's Nicklas Lidström. Individually, Niedermayer played his 1,000th career game, against the Edmonton Oilers on November 28, 2006. He set career highs of 15 goals, 54 assists and 69 points during the regular season and was named a First Team All-Star. He added 11 points in the 2007 Stanley Cup playoffs, and was named recipient of the Conn Smythe Memorial Trophy as the most valuable player of the post-season after leading Anaheim to the franchise's first championship in a five-game series victory over the Ottawa Senators in the 2007 Stanley Cup Final. As team captain, Niedermayer was the first player given the chance to hoist the Stanley Cup. He passed the trophy to his brother; it was Rob's first championship victory. Of the moment, Scott stated: "You don't really dream of passing it to your brother. I never have. To be able to do that is definitely a highlight of my career."

Coming off his fourth championship, the 34-year-old Niedermayer contemplated retirement. Remaining undecided on his future as the 2007–08 season began, he failed to report to the team and was suspended by the Ducks as a formality. Pronger replaced him as captain, and Niedermayer remained undecided until early December when he finally chose to return. He appeared in only 48 games that season, scoring 25 points, but played in his fourth All-Star Game.

After the Ducks were eliminated in the first round of the 2008 playoffs, he again contemplated retirement, but quickly made the decision to return for the 2008–09 season. He regained captaincy of the Ducks, and played in his fifth All-Star Game during the season in which he scored 59 points in 82 games. In what proved to be his final season, 2009–10, Niedermayer scored 48 points in 80 games. He announced his retirement as a player on June 22, 2010, but remained with the Ducks organization as a consultant to general manager Bob Murray. He turned to coaching in 2012–13 season, serving as a special assignment coach with the Ducks.

== International play ==
Niedermayer enjoyed a long and successful international career, winning championships at all levels. He made his international debut as a 17-year-old with the Canadian junior team at the 1991 World Junior Ice Hockey Championships. He appeared in three games as Team Canada used a late goal by John Slaney in the final game of the tournament, against the Soviet Union, to win the gold medal. He returned for the 1992 tournament, one which The Sports Network described as one of the most disappointing in Canadian history, as the team finished sixth in the eight team event.

Four years later, in 1996, Niedermayer first joined the senior team at the inaugural World Cup of Hockey. He had a goal and three assists in eight games, but Canada lost the championship final to the United States. Niedermayer next made his Olympic debut in 2002. He appeared in six games, and helped Canada defeat the United States, 5–2 in the final as the country won its first Olympic gold medal in hockey in 50 years.

Gold medal victories followed in 2004 as Niedermayer scored five points in nine games at the World Championship then added two points in six games at the World Cup of Hockey. In the latter event, Niedermayer scored a goal in the championship game, a 3–2 victory over Finland. He was set to make his second Olympic appearance in 2006, however a knee injury suffered during NHL play that required surgery forced him to withdraw from the tournament.

Niedermayer's final international competition came at the 2010 Olympics, four months before his retirement as a player. He was named captain of the team for the tournament that was held in his home province, in Vancouver. He led Canada to the gold medal, culminating in a 3–2 overtime win over the United States.

== Playing style ==
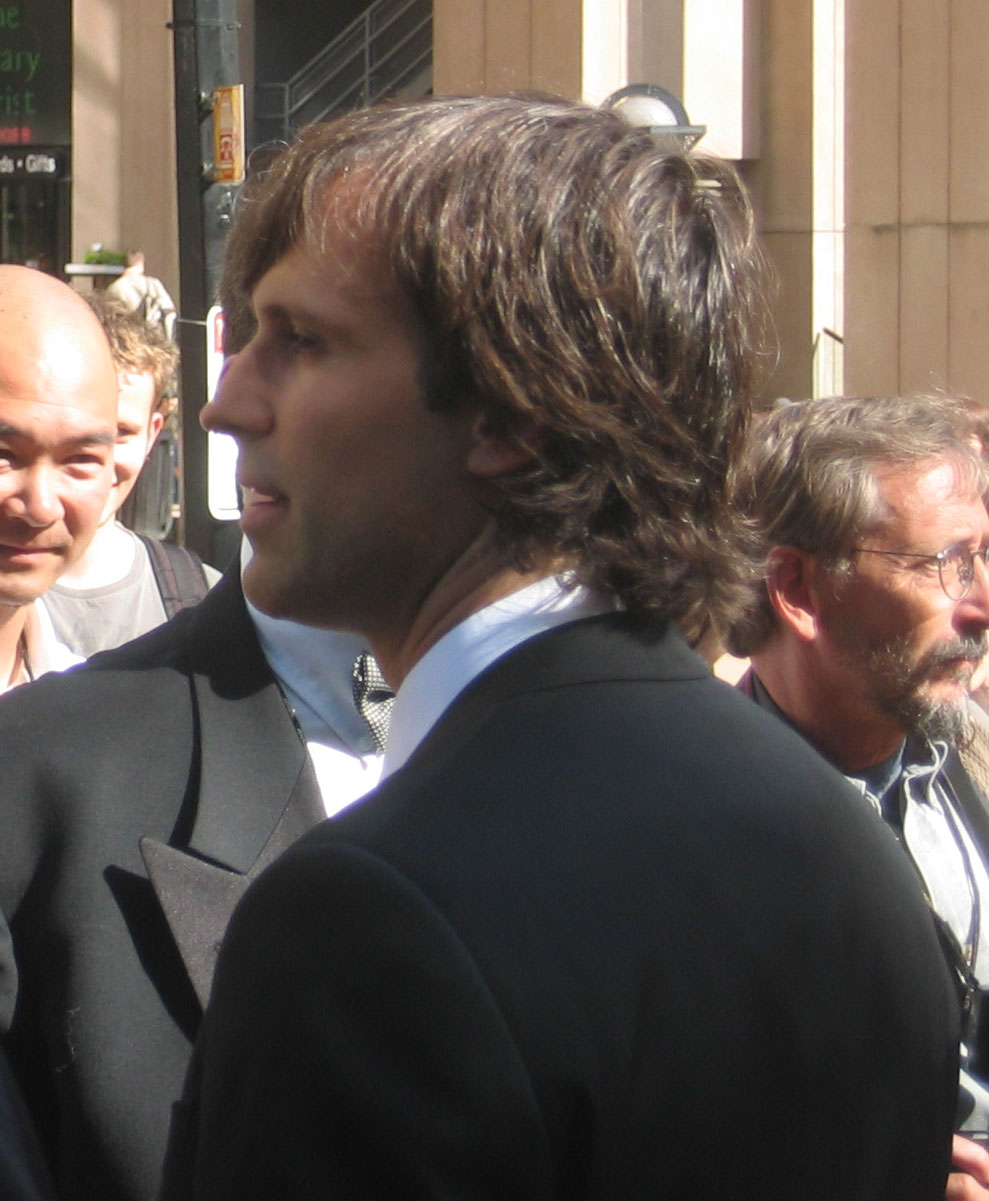
Niedermayer at the NHL Awards in 2006

An offensively-minded defenceman, Niedermayer was best known for his skating ability and drew comparison's to the game's offensive greats from the time he broke into the NHL. He was compared to Paul Coffey for his ability to take the puck from his own goal line and convert a defensive situation into an offensive rush. He often chafed at playing within the Devils' defence-oriented system, feeling it restricted his offensive creativity, but also admitted that he learned to place greater emphasis on his defence and develop his overall game. Niedermayer earned a reputation for inconsistency early in his career. He often played his best games against top opposition, but his failure to consistently apply his skills against all opposition occasionally frustrated his teammates and left his coaches lamenting that he was a player capable of being dominant but often was not. By the end of his career however, and following his Norris Trophy win in 2004, Niedermayer was regarded as one of the top offensive defencemen of his generation. Niedermayer and former Ducks teammate Corey Perry are the only players in hockey history to win every major contemporary North American and International Competitive titles: the Memorial Cup, World Junior championship, Stanley Cup, World Championship, World Cup and Olympic Games.

Niedermayer has been honoured on several occasions. The New Jersey Devils retired his jersey number 27 in 2011, and the Kamloops Blazers retired the number 28 he wore in junior in 2013. He has been inducted into the BC Hockey Hall of Fame and Canada's Sports Hall of Fame. Niedermayer was elected to the Hockey Hall of Fame as part of its 2013 class, and was inducted on November 11, 2013.

== Personal life ==
Niedermayer and his wife Lisa have four sons. The family resides in Penticton, British Columbia, but often returns to Cranbrook, where they spent the off-seasons while he was playing. Scott and Lisa are active in the community. They serve as honorary co-chairs of the Walk for Kids, a charity event that supports the Ronald McDonald House of Orange County, while Scott and his brother Rob operate a hockey school in Cranbrook and established a fund that offers grants to community associations. An active environmentalist, Scott has also joined with WWF-Canada to speak out in favour of efforts to maintain British Columbia's natural wilderness.

== Career statistics ==
=== Regular season and playoffs ===
			Regular season					Playoffs
Season	Team	League	GP	G	A	Pts	PIM	GP	G	A	Pts	PIM
1989–90	Kamloops Blazers	WHL	64	14	55	69	64	17	2	14	16	35
1990–91	Kamloops Blazers	WHL	57	26	56	82	52	—	—	—	—	—
1991–92	New Jersey Devils	NHL	4	0	1	1	2	—	—	—	—	—
1991–92	Kamloops Blazers	WHL	35	7	32	39	61	17	9	14	23	28
1992–93	New Jersey Devils	NHL	80	11	29	40	47	5	0	3	3	2
1993–94	New Jersey Devils	NHL	81	10	36	46	42	20	2	2	4	8
1994–95	New Jersey Devils	NHL	48	4	15	19	18	20	4	7	11	10
1995–96	New Jersey Devils	NHL	79	8	25	33	46	—	—	—	—	—
1996–97	New Jersey Devils	NHL	81	5	30	35	64	10	2	4	6	6
1997–98	New Jersey Devils	NHL	81	14	43	57	27	6	0	2	2	4
1998–99	Utah Grizzlies	IHL	5	0	2	2	0	—	—	—	—	—
1998–99	New Jersey Devils	NHL	72	11	35	46	26	7	1	3	4	18
1999–00	New Jersey Devils	NHL	71	7	31	38	48	22	5	2	7	10
2000–01	New Jersey Devils	NHL	57	6	29	35	22	21	0	6	6	14
2001–02	New Jersey Devils	NHL	76	11	22	33	30	6	0	2	2	6
2002–03	New Jersey Devils	NHL	81	11	28	39	62	24	2	16	18	16
2003–04	New Jersey Devils	NHL	81	14	40	54	44	5	1	0	1	6
2005–06	Mighty Ducks of Anaheim	NHL	82	13	50	63	96	16	2	9	11	14
2006–07	Anaheim Ducks	NHL	79	15	54	69	86	21	3	8	11	26
2007–08	Anaheim Ducks	NHL	48	8	17	25	16	6	0	2	2	4
2008–09	Anaheim Ducks	NHL	82	14	45	59	70	13	3	7	10	11
2009–10	Anaheim Ducks	NHL	80	10	38	48	38	—	—	—	—	—
NHL totals			1,263	172	568	740	784	202	25	73	98	155

=== International ===
Year	Team	Event	GP	G	A	Pts	PIM
1991	Canada	WJC	3	0	0	0	0
1992	Canada	WJC	7	0	0	0	10
1996	Canada	WCH	8	1	3	4	6
2002	Canada	OLY	6	1	1	2	4
2004	Canada	WC	9	3	2	5	12
2004	Canada	WCH	6	1	1	2	9
2010	Canada	OLY	7	1	2	3	4
Junior totals			10	0	0	0	10
Senior totals			36	7	9	16	35

== Awards and honours ==
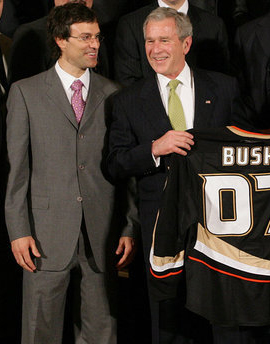
Niedermayer (left) presenting U.S. President George W. Bush with a Ducks jersey following their 2007 championship.

Award	Year
WHL
Western Conference first All-Star team	1991, 1992
Daryl K. (Doc) Seaman Trophy	1991
CHL Scholastic Player of the Year	1991
Stafford Smythe Memorial Trophy	1992
NHL
All-Rookie Team	1993
First team All-Star	2004, 2006, 2007
Second Team All-Star	1998
All-Star Game	1998, 2001, 2004, 2008, 2009
James Norris Memorial Trophy	2004
Conn Smythe Trophy	2007
Stanley Cup champion	1995, 2000, 2003, 2007
One of 100 Greatest NHL Players	2017
International
WJC All-Star team	1992
Hockey Hall of Fame	2013
IIHF Hall of Fame	2015
IIHF All-Time Canada Team	2020

== See also ==
- List of family relations in the NHL

Awards and achievements
Preceded by Martin Brodeur	New Jersey Devils first-round draft pick 1991	Succeeded by Brian Rolston
Preceded by Nicklas Lidström	Winner of the Norris Trophy; 2004	Succeeded by Nicklas Lidstrom
Preceded by Cam Ward	Winner of the Conn Smythe Trophy; 2007	Succeeded by Henrik Zetterberg
Sporting positions
Preceded by Scott Stevens	New Jersey Devils captain 2004; While Stevens was injured	Succeeded by Patrik Elias
Preceded by Steve Rucchin; Chris Pronger	Mighty Ducks of Anaheim/Anaheim Ducks captain 2005–07; 2008–10	Succeeded by Chris Pronger; Ryan Getzlaf
