= 1991–92 WHL season =

Junior ice hockey season

- League: Western Hockey League
- Sport: Ice hockey
- Teams: 15

Regular season
- Scotty Munro Memorial Trophy: Kamloops Blazers (5)
- Season MVP: Steve Konowalchuk (Portland Winter Hawks)
- Top scorer: Kevin St. Jacques (Lethbridge Hurricanes)

Playoffs
- Playoffs MVP: Jarrett Deuling (Blazers)
- Finals champions: Kamloops Blazers (4)
- Runners-up: Saskatoon Blades

WHL seasons
- 1990–91 1992–93

1991–92 CHL season
- League: Canadian Hockey League
- Sport: Ice hockey
- Teams: 43

OHL

QMJHL

WHL

Memorial Cup
- Finals champions: Kamloops Blazers (WHL) (1st title)
- Runners-up: Sault Ste. Marie Greyhounds (OHL)

The 1991–92 WHL season was the 26th season of the Western Hockey League (WHL). The season featured fifteen teams and a 72-game regular season. The Kamloops Blazers won their fifth Scotty Munro Memorial Trophy as regular season champions, and followed this up in the playoffs by defeating the Saskatoon Blades in the championship series to claim their fourth President's Cup title. With the win, the Blazers advanced to the 1992 Memorial Cup tournament, where they won the franchise's first Memorial Cup championship.

The season saw the Tacoma Rockets join the league as its fifteenth franchise, and its fifth based in the United States.

== Team changes ==
- The Tacoma Rockets join the WHL as an expansion team.

== Regular season ==
=== Final standings ===
East Division
Pos	Team	Pld	W	L	T	GF	GA	Pts
1	x – Prince Albert Raiders	72	50	20	2	356	261	102
2	x – Medicine Hat Tigers	72	48	24	0	336	264	96
3	x – Saskatoon Blades	72	38	29	5	315	260	81
4	x – Lethbridge Hurricanes	72	39	31	2	350	284	80
5	x – Swift Current Broncos	72	35	33	4	296	313	74
6	x – Moose Jaw Warriors	72	33	36	3	279	316	69
7	Regina Pats	72	31	36	5	300	298	67
8	Brandon Wheat Kings	72	11	55	6	246	356	28

x – qualified for playoffs

West Division
Pos	Team	Pld	W	L	T	GF	GA	Pts
1	x – Kamloops Blazers	72	51	17	4	351	226	106
2	x – Spokane Chiefs	72	37	29	6	267	270	80
3	x – Tri-City Americans	72	35	35	2	363	376	72
4	x – Seattle Thunderbirds	72	33	34	5	292	285	71
5	x – Portland Winter Hawks	72	31	37	4	314	342	66
6	x – Tacoma Rockets	72	24	43	5	273	346	53
7	Victoria Cougars	72	15	52	5	231	372	35

x – qualified for playoffs

=== Scoring leaders ===
Note: GP = Games played; G = Goals; A = Assists; Pts = Points; PIM = Penalties in minutes

Player	Team	GP	G	A	Pts	PIM
Kevin St. Jacques	Lethbridge Hurricanes	71	65	75	140	119
Terry Degner	Tri-City Americans	72	58	81	139	63
Brian Sakic	Tri-City Americans	72	45	83	128	35
Kevin Riehl	Medicine Hat Tigers	69	65	50	115	87
Chris Schmidt	Moose Jaw Warriors	72	60	54	114	16
Jeff Nelson	Prince Albert Raiders	64	48	65	113	64
Zac Boyer	Kamloops Blazers	70	40	69	109	70
Steve Konowalchuk	Portland Winter Hawks	64	51	53	104	95
Andy Schneider	Swift Current Broncos	63	44	60	104	100
Donevan Hextall	Prince Albert Raiders	71	33	71	104	95

== Players ==
Trades

- June 27, 1991 — the Tacoma Rockets acquire Trevor Pennock from the Seattle Thunderbirds, in exchange for Lloyd Shaw.

== 1992 WHL Playoffs ==
First round
E1	Prince Albert	4
E6	Moose Jaw	0
E2	Medicine Hat	0
E5	Swift Current	4
E3	Saskatoon	4
E4	Lethbridge	1
W1	Kamloops	4
W6	Tacoma	0
W2	Spokane	4
W5	Portland	2
W3	Tri-City	1
W4	Seattle	4

Division Semi-Finals
E1	Prince Albert	bye
E3	Saskatoon	3
E5	Swift Current	1
W1	Kamloops	bye
W2	Spokane	1
W4	Seattle	3

Division Finals
E1	Prince Albert	2
E3	Saskatoon	4
W1	Kamloops	4
W2	Seattle	2

WHL Championship
E3	Saskatoon	3
W1	Kamloops	4

== All-Star game ==
On February 5, the WHL All-Stars defeated a combined QMJHL/OHL All-Star team 5–4 in double overtime at Saskatoon, Saskatchewan before a crowd of 4,519.

== WHL awards ==
Most Valuable Player - Four Broncos Memorial Trophy: Steve Konowalchuk, Portland Winter Hawks
Scholastic Player of the Year - Daryl K. (Doc) Seaman Trophy: Ashley Buckberger, Swift Current Broncos
Top Scorer - Bob Clarke Trophy: Kevin St. Jacques, Lethbridge Hurricanes
Most Sportsmanlike Player - Brad Hornung Trophy: Steve Junker, Spokane Chiefs
Top Defenseman - Bill Hunter Trophy: Richard Matvichuk, Saskatoon Blades
Rookie of the Year - Jim Piggott Memorial Trophy: Ashley Buckberger, Swift Current Broncos
Top Goaltender - Del Wilson Trophy: Corey Hirsch, Kamloops Blazers
Coach of the Year - Dunc McCallum Memorial Trophy: Bryan Maxwell, Spokane Chiefs
Executive of the Year - Lloyd Saunders Memorial Trophy: Daryl Lubiniecki, Saskatoon Blades
Regular season champions - Scotty Munro Memorial Trophy: Kamloops Blazers
Marketing/Public Relations Award - St. Clair Group Trophy: Mark Dennis, Tacoma Rockets
WHL Plus-Minus Award: Dean McAmmond, Prince Albert Raiders
WHL Playoff Most Valuable Player: Jarrett Deuling, Kamloops Blazers

== All-Star teams ==
East Division
	First Team		Second Team	
Goal	Trevor Robins	Saskatoon Blades	Sonny Mignacca	Medicine Hat Tigers
Defense	Richard Matvichuk	Saskatoon Blades	Mike Rathje	Medicine Hat Tigers
Defense	David Cooper	Medicine Hat Tigers	Brent Bilodeau	Swift Current Broncos
Center	Kevin St. Jacques	Lethbridge Hurricanes	Jeff Nelson	Prince Albert Raiders
Left Wing	Brad Zavisha	Lethbridge Hurricanes	Donevan Hextall	Prince Albert Raiders
Right Wing	Chris Schmidt	Moose Jaw Warriors	Frank Kovacs	Regina Pats
West Division
	First Team		Second Team	
Goal	Corey Hirsch	Kamloops Blazers	Scott Bailey	Spokane Chiefs
Defense	Darryl Sydor	Kamloops Blazers	Frank Evans	Spokane Chiefs
Defense	Scott Niedermayer	Kamloops Blazers	Todd Klassen	Tri-City Americans
Center	Steve Konowalchuk	Portland Winter Hawks	Terry Degner	Tri-City Americans
Left Wing	Vladimir Vujtek	Tri-City Americans	Bill Lindsay	Tri-City Americans
Right Wing	Turner Stevenson	Seattle Thunderbirds	Mike Kennedy	Seattle Thunderbirds

== See also ==
- 1992 NHL entry draft
- 1991 in sports
- 1992 in sports

== Bibliography ==
- 2005–06 WHL Guide

Preceded by 1990–91 WHL season	WHL seasons	Succeeded by 1992–93 WHL season
