= 1988 Memorial Cup =

Canadian junior men's ice hockey championship

Tournament details
- Venue(s): Centre Georges-Vézina; Chicoutimi, Quebec
- Dates: May 7–14, 1988
- Teams: 4
- Host team: Chicoutimi Saguenéens (QMJHL; did not participate)

Final positions
- Champions: Medicine Hat Tigers (WHL) (2nd title)

Tournament statistics
- Games played: 8

The Memorial Cup trophy

The 1988 Memorial Cup occurred May 7–14 at the Centre Georges-Vézina in Chicoutimi, Quebec. It was the 70th annual Memorial Cup competition and determined the major junior ice hockey champion of the Canadian Hockey League (CHL). Participating teams were the Quebec Major Junior Hockey League champion Hull Olympiques, the QMJHL runner-up, the Drummondville Voltigeurs, as well as the winners of the Western Hockey League and Ontario Hockey League which were the Medicine Hat Tigers and Windsor Spitfires. The original host team, the Chicoutimi Saguenéens, did not participate as they did not make it far enough in the QMJHL playoffs. Although the Spitfires entered the Cup final having won 39 of the previous 40 games they had played, Medicine Hat won their second Memorial Cup in a row, defeating Windsor in the final game.

== Teams ==
QMJHL Team OHL Team WHL Team Host Team

=== Drummondville Voltigeurs ===
The Drummondville Voltigeurs represented the Quebec Major Junior Hockey League at the 1988 Memorial Cup as they were the runner-up to the league champions, the Hull Olympiques. The Voltigeurs were coached by Jean Bégin, and finished the 1987–88 season with a 35-31-4 record, earning 74 points, and finishing in second place in the Lebel Division. Drummondville had the sixth best offense in the ten team league, as they scored 341 goals. The club finished with in fifth in goals against, as they allowed 327 goals. In the Dilio Division semi-finals, the Voltigeurs defeated the Victoriaville Tigres four games to one. In the division final, Drummondville defeated the Shawinigan Cataractes four games to one, advancing to the President's Cup final. In the league final, the Voltigeurs faced off against the top regular season club in the league, the Hull Olympiques. The Olympiques were able to defeat the Voltigeurs in seven games, however, Drummondville advanced to the Memorial Cup as the host team, the Chicoutimi Saguenéens, were eliminated in the first round of the playoffs.

The Voltigeurs offense was led by Steve Chartrand, who scored a team high 50 goals and 112 points in 68 games. Chartrand continued to lead Drummondville in the post-season, as he led the club with 16 goals and 28 points in 17 games. Martin Bergeron also cracked the 100 point plateau, as he scored 45 goals and 109 points in 64 games, as did Alain Charland, who scored 47 goals and 104 points in 64 games. Midway through the season, the Voltigeurs acquired Rob Murphy in a trade with the Laval Titan. Murphy began the season appearing in five games with the Vancouver Canucks of the National Hockey League. In 33 games with Drummondville, Murphy scored 18 goals and 44 points. Daniel Dore scored 24 goals and 63 points in 64 games, while accumulating 223 penalty minutes. Dore won the Mike Bossy Trophy, awarded to the Top Prospect in the QMJHL. Dore would later be drafted by the Quebec Nordiques in the first round, fifth overall, at the 1988 NHL entry draft. On defense, Mario Doyon led the scoring, as he had 23 goals and 77 points in 64 games. Eric Tremblay scored six goals and 70 points in 61 games to finish second in defenseman scoring. In goal, the Voltigeurs were led by Frédéric Chabot, who posted a 27-24-4 record with a 4.34 GAA in 58 games.

The 1988 Memorial Cup was the first time in team history that the Voltigeurs qualified for the tournament.

=== Hull Olympiques ===
The Hull Olympiques represented the Quebec Major Junior Hockey League at the 1988 Memorial Cup. The Olympiques finished the 1987–88 regular season with the top record in the league, as they were 43-23-4, earning 90 points, and winning the Jean Rougeau Trophy for their accomplishment. Hull led the QMJHL in scoring, as the club recorded 383 goals. Defensively, the Olympiques ranked second, as they allowed 293 goals. In the post-season, the Olympiques defeated the Granby Bisons four games to one in the Lebel Division semi-finals. In the division finals, the Olympiques were able to get past the Laval Titan in seven games, earning a berth into the President's Cup final. In the final round, the Olympiques defeated the Drummondville Voltigeurs in another seven-game series, winning the league championship and earning a berth into the 1988 Memorial Cup.

Hull's high powered offense was led by Marc Saumier, who scored 52 goals and 166 points in 59 games to lead the team in scoring, and finishing third overall in the league for points. He was awarded the Michel Briere Trophy as QMJHL MVP after his outstanding season. In the post-season, Saumier led the league with 17 goals and 48 points in 19 games, winning the Guy Lafleur Trophy as QMJHL Playoff MVP. Martin Gélinas scored 63 goals and 131 points in 65 games, and was awarded the Michel Bergeron Trophy as QMJHL Offensive Rookie of the Year. Following the season, Gelinas was selected by the Los Angeles Kings in the first round, seventh overall, at the 1988 NHL entry draft. Benoît Brunet, a Montreal Canadiens prospect, scored 54 goals and 143 points in 62 games, while Kelly Nester scored 40 goals and 100 points in 68 games, giving the Olympiques four 100+ point scorers. On defense, Herbert Hohenberger led the club with 21 goals and 60 points in 60 games. During the season, Hull acquired Boston Bruins prospect Stéphane Quintal in a trade with the Granby Bisons. In 15 games with the Olympiques, Quintal scored six goals and 15 points. In goal, the club was led by Jason Glickman, who posted a 31-15-4 with a 3.76 GAA in 55 games.

The 1988 Memorial Cup was the second time in team history that the Olympiques qualified for the tournament. At the 1986 Memorial Cup, Hull lost to the Guelph Platers in the final game.

=== Medicine Hat Tigers ===
The Medicine Hat Tigers represented the Western Hockey League at the 1988 Memorial Cup. The Tigers finished the 1987–88 season with a 44-22-6 record, earning 94 points and second place in the East Division. The Tigers scored 353 goals during the regular season, ranking them fifth in the 14 team league. Defensively, Medicine Hat allowed the fewest goals in the league, with 261 goals against. After earning a first round bye in the post-season, the Tigers defeated the Prince Albert Raiders four games to two in the East Division semi-finals. In the division finals, Medicine Hat upset the first place Saskatoon Blades by sweeping them in four games, advancing to the President's Cup final. In the championship round, the Tigers defeated the first place team in the West Division, the Kamloops Blazers, four games to two, to win the title and earn a berth into the 1988 Memorial Cup.

Offensively, the Tigers were led by Montreal Canadiens prospect Mark Pederson, who led the club with 53 goals and 111 points in 62 games. Top prospect Trevor Linden scored 46 goals and 110 points in 67 games, as following the season, he was selected by the Vancouver Canucks with the second overall pick at the 1988 NHL entry draft. Rob DiMaio scored 47 goals and 91 points in 54 games during the regular season, as he followed up with a team high 12 goals and 31 points in 14 post-season games. The Tigers acquired Cal Zankowski in a mid-season trade with the New Westminster Bruins, as in 46 games with Medicine Hat, he scored 31 goals and 42 points. On defense, Scott McCrady led the Tigers in scoring, as he scored seven goals and 77 points in 65 games. Los Angeles Kings top prospect, Wayne McBean, scored 15 goals and 45 points in 30 games from the Tigers blue line after beginning the season in the National Hockey League. In goal, the Tigers were led by Mark Fitzpatrick, who posted a 3.23 GAA and a .901 save percentage in 63 games.

The 1988 Memorial Cup was the second consecutive season that the Tigers qualified for the tournament. At the 1987 Memorial Cup, Medicine Hat defeated the Oshawa Generals to win the Memorial Cup for the first time in team history. The Tigers also qualified for the 1973 Memorial Cup, where they finished in third place.

=== Windsor Spitfires ===
The Windsor Spitfires represented the Ontario Hockey League at the 1988 Memorial Cup. The Spitfires were the top team in the OHL during the 1987–88 season, as they had a record of 50-14-2, earning 102, and winning the Hamilton Spectator Trophy for their achievement. The Spitfires scored a league high 396 goals, while the club allowed 215 goals, which ranked them second in the 15 team league. Windsor opened the playoffs with a four-game sweep against the Kitchener Rangers during the Emms Division quarter-finals. The club earned a second round bye in the division semi-finals. In the Emms Division finals, Windsor swept the Hamilton Steelhawks in four games, advancing to the J. Ross Robertson Cup finals. In the final round of the playoffs, Windsor swept the Peterborough Petes in four games, as they won the OHL championship with a perfect 12–0 record in the playoffs, and earned a berth into the 1988 Memorial Cup.

The Spitfires high-scoring offense was led by Kelly Cain, who led the team with 57 goals and 133 points in 66 games after joining the club during an off-season trade. Cain finished in third in the OHL scoring race. Mike Wolak scored 42 goals and 114 points in 63 games to finish in second in club scoring. David Haas was acquired by the Spitfires in an early season trade with the Belleville Bulls, as in 58 games, he scored 59 goals and 105 points, while leading the club with 237 penalty minutes. Darrin Shannon emerged as a top prospect for the 1988 NHL entry draft, as in 43 games, he scored 33 goals and 74 points. Shannon would be selected by the Pittsburgh Penguins with the fourth overall pick following the season. Shannon was also awarded the Bobby Smith Trophy as the OHL's Scholastic Player of the Year. Adam Graves, a Detroit Red Wings prospect, appeared in 37 games with Windsor, scoring 28 goals and 60 points. In the post-season, he led the club with 14 goals and 32 points in 12 games. Brad Hyatt led the Spitfires defense in scoring, as he had 24 goals and 88 points in 56 games. Darryl Shannon, a Toronto Maple Leafs prospect, scored 16 goals and 86 points in 60 games, and was awarded the Max Kaminsky Trophy as the OHL's Most Outstanding Defenseman. Peter Ing handled the Spitfires goaltending duties, as in 43 games, he posted a 3.10 GAA.

The 1988 Memorial Cup was the first time in franchise history that the Spitfires qualified for the tournament.

== Round-robin standings ==
Pos	Team	Pld	W	L	GF	GA	
1	Windsor Spitfires (OHL)	3	3	0	18	9	Advanced directly to the championship game
2	Medicine Hat Tigers (WHL)	3	2	1	16	9	Advanced to the semifinal game
3	Hull Olympiques (QMJHL)	3	1	2	12	14	Advanced to the semifinal game
4	Drummondville Voltigeurs (QMJHL runner-up)	3	0	3	6	20	

== Scores ==
Round-robin

- May 7 – Windsor 8–3 Drummondville
- May 8 – Medicine Hat 7–1 Drummondville
- May 8 – Windsor 5–4 Hull
- May 9 – Medicine Hat 7–3 Hull
- May 10 – Windsor 5–2 Medicine Hat
- May 11 – Hull 5–2 Drummondville

Semi-final

- May 12 – Medicine Hat 5–3 Hull

Final

- May 14 – Medicine Hat 7–6 Windsor

=== Winning roster ===
1987–88 Medicine Hat Tigers
Goaltenders: – Mark Fitzpatrick	Defencemen: – Mark Barlage; – Vince Boe; – Dean Chynoweth – C; – Dan Kordic; – Wayne McBean; – Scott McCrady – A; – Ryan McGill; – Neil Wilkinson	Wingers: – Rob DiMaio – A; – Clayton Gainer; – Kirby Lindal; – Mark Pederson – A; – Jason Prosofsky; – Darren Taylor; – Mark Woolf; – Cal Zankowski	Centres: – Neil Brady; – Murray Garbutt; – Wayne Hynes; – Trevor Linden; – Jason Miller; Coach: Barry Melrose; General Manager: Russ Farwell

== Award winners ==
- Stafford Smythe Memorial Trophy (MVP): Rob DiMaio, Medicine Hat
- George Parsons Trophy (Sportsmanship): Martin Gélinas, Hull
- Hap Emms Memorial Trophy (Goaltender): Mark Fitzpatrick, Medicine Hat

All-star team

- Goal: Mark Fitzpatrick, Medicine Hat
- Defence: Dean Chynoweth, Medicine Hat; Darryl Shannon, Windsor
- Centre: Rob DiMaio, Medicine Hat
- Left wing: Darrin Shannon, Windsor
- Right wing: Trevor Linden, Medicine Hat
