= Maxime Talbot =

Canadian ice hockey player (born 1984)

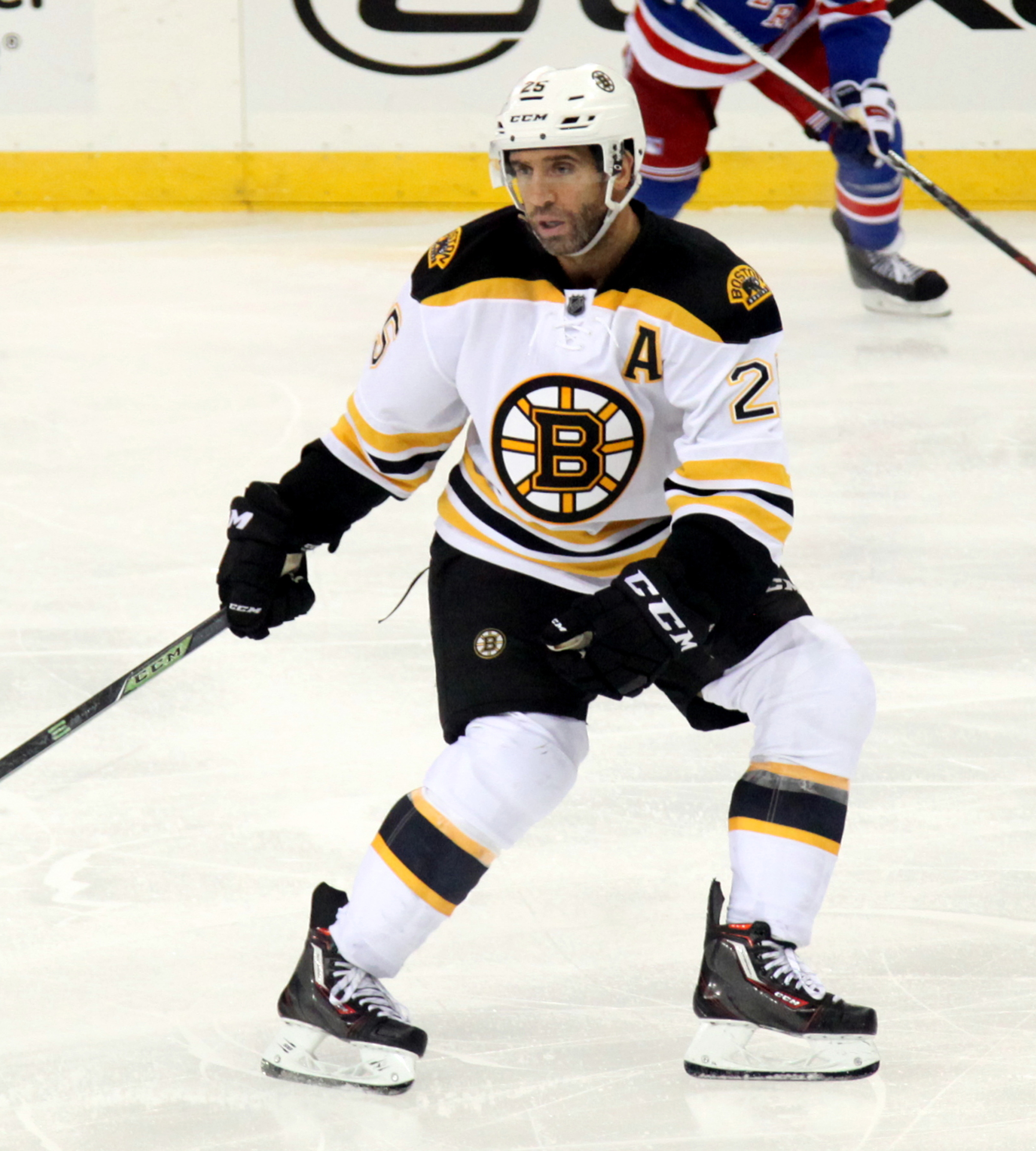
- Talbot with the Boston Bruins in 2015
- Born: February 11, 1984 (age 42) LeMoyne, Quebec, Canada
- Height: 5 ft 11 in (180 cm)
- Weight: 186 lb (84 kg; 13 st 4 lb)
- Position: Centre
- Shot: Left
- Played for: Pittsburgh Penguins; Philadelphia Flyers; Ilves; Colorado Avalanche; Boston Bruins; Lokomotiv Yaroslavl; Avangard Omsk
- NHL draft: 234th overall, 2002; Pittsburgh Penguins
- Playing career: 2005–2019

Maxime Talbot (born February 11, 1984) is a Canadian former professional ice hockey centre who played in the National Hockey League (NHL) for the Pittsburgh Penguins, Philadelphia Flyers, Colorado Avalanche and Boston Bruins. He was drafted into the NHL out of the Quebec Major Junior Hockey League (QMJHL) by the Pittsburgh Penguins, 234th overall, in the 2002 NHL entry draft. He led the Hull/Gatineau Olympiques to back-to-back President's Cups while earning the Guy Lafleur Trophy as playoff MVP both years.

During the 2009 Stanley Cup Final against the Detroit Red Wings, while still playing for Pittsburgh, Talbot scored his team's only two goals in Pittsburgh's 2–1 victory over Detroit in the series-deciding game seven, securing the Penguins' Stanley Cup championship win.

Talbot finished his career playing three seasons in the Kontinental Hockey League (KHL) for Lokomotiv Yaroslavl and Avangard Omsk.

== Playing career ==
=== Amateur ===
Talbot was selected by the Quebec Major Junior Hockey League (QMJHL)'s Rouyn-Noranda Huskies in the first round of the 2000 QMJHL Draft. At the league trade deadline that year, Talbot was traded to the Hull Olympiques in exchange for Alexandre Giroux. Talbot completed his major junior rookie season with a combined 37 points between the two teams.

Before the start of the 2002–03 season, Talbot was named team captain for the Olympiques and finished the year with a major junior career-high 46 goals and 104 points in 69 games, good for fifth in QMJHL scoring and for QMJHL Second All-Star Team honours. In the playoffs that year, he led the league in scoring with 44 points in 20 games as he captained the Olympiques to a QMJHL Championship, also earning the Guy Lafleur Trophy as playoff MVP in the process. Playing the Ontario Hockey League (OHL)'s Kitchener Rangers in the final of the subsequent 2003 Memorial Cup, they were defeated 6–3.

In the 2003–04 season, Talbot finished third in scoring in the QMJHL with 98 points (25 goals and 73 assists) in 51 games as the team became the Gatineau Olympiques through the amalgamation of Hull into the City of Gatineau. He led the team to a second consecutive QMJHL championship while again being named playoff MVP and leading the league in playoff scoring for the second-straight year. He was the first to earn back-to-back Guy Lafleur Trophies since Marc Saumier in 1987 and 1988. However, the Olympiques were defeated for the second-straight year in the Memorial Cup Final, losing 2–1 to the Western Hockey League (WHL)'s Kelowna Rockets.

=== Pittsburgh Penguins ===
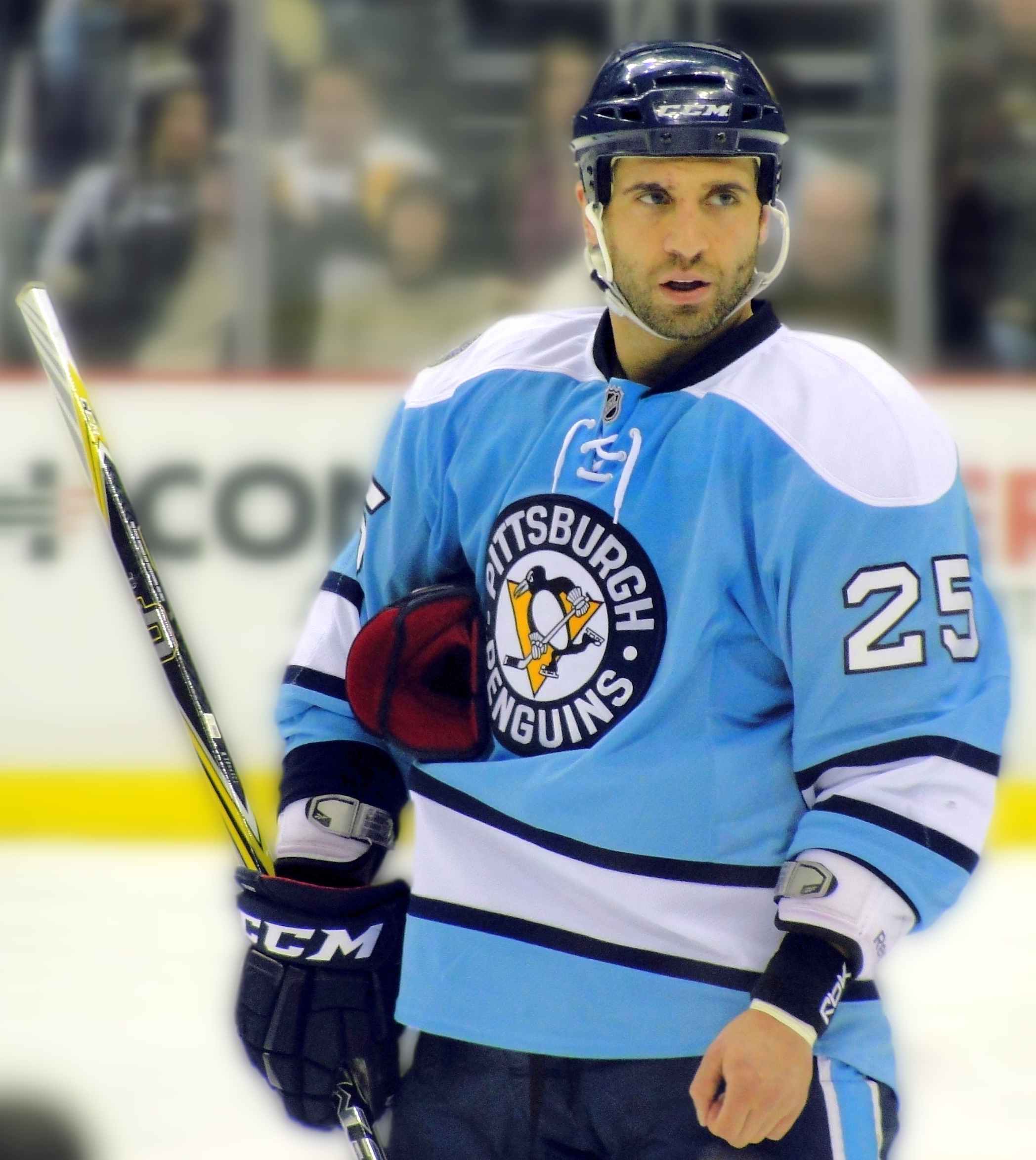
Talbot during his final season with the Pittsburgh Penguins in January 2011

As the 2004–05 season approached, Talbot was signed by the Pittsburgh Penguins and was assigned to make his professional debut with the team's American Hockey League (AHL) affiliate, the Wilkes-Barre/Scranton Penguins. He was assigned to various linemates and was placed in many role playing opportunities. He did not have the offensive power in the AHL, however, that he did in the QMJHL, but nonetheless Talbot showed quality traits in other aspects of the game as he finished his debut season with 19 points (7 goals and 12 assists) in 75 games.

With an impressive training camp, Talbot made the Penguins' opening roster for the 2005–06 season, making his NHL debut against the New Jersey Devils. He scored his first career NHL goal on October 14, 2005, from centre ice against the Philadelphia Flyers. His primary role during his rookie season was that of a penalty killer. He would later be sent down to the AHL after 48 games in the NHL, during which time he recorded eight points (five goals and three assists).

Talbot did not start the 2006–07 season in the NHL but was recalled by Pittsburgh on October 24, 2006, just five games into the AHL season. He would play that same night against New Jersey. Talbot continued to play a key role on the penalty kill, recording four short-handed goals to go with a season total of 24 points (13 goals and 11 assists).

Talbot scored four goals in the first five games of the 2007–08 season. He was the part of an on-ice prank on December 1, 2007, when he briefly donned the jersey of teammate Sidney Crosby during an optional practice that Crosby had chosen to skip. He initially drew a large cheer from the crowd in Toronto before they realized the jersey switch.

In game three of the 2008 Eastern Conference Quarterfinals, Talbot scored a backhand goal against Ottawa Senators goaltender Martin Gerber less than five minutes after the Senators had taken the lead in that game. In the Conference Final against the Philadelphia Flyers, Talbot scored the game-winning goal in the third period of game two. He did this in his first game back from a broken foot that had sidelined him for the previous four playoff games. In game five of the 2008 Stanley Cup Final against the Detroit Red Wings, he scored the tying goal with 35 seconds remaining, allowing the Penguins to score in triple overtime to force a game six.

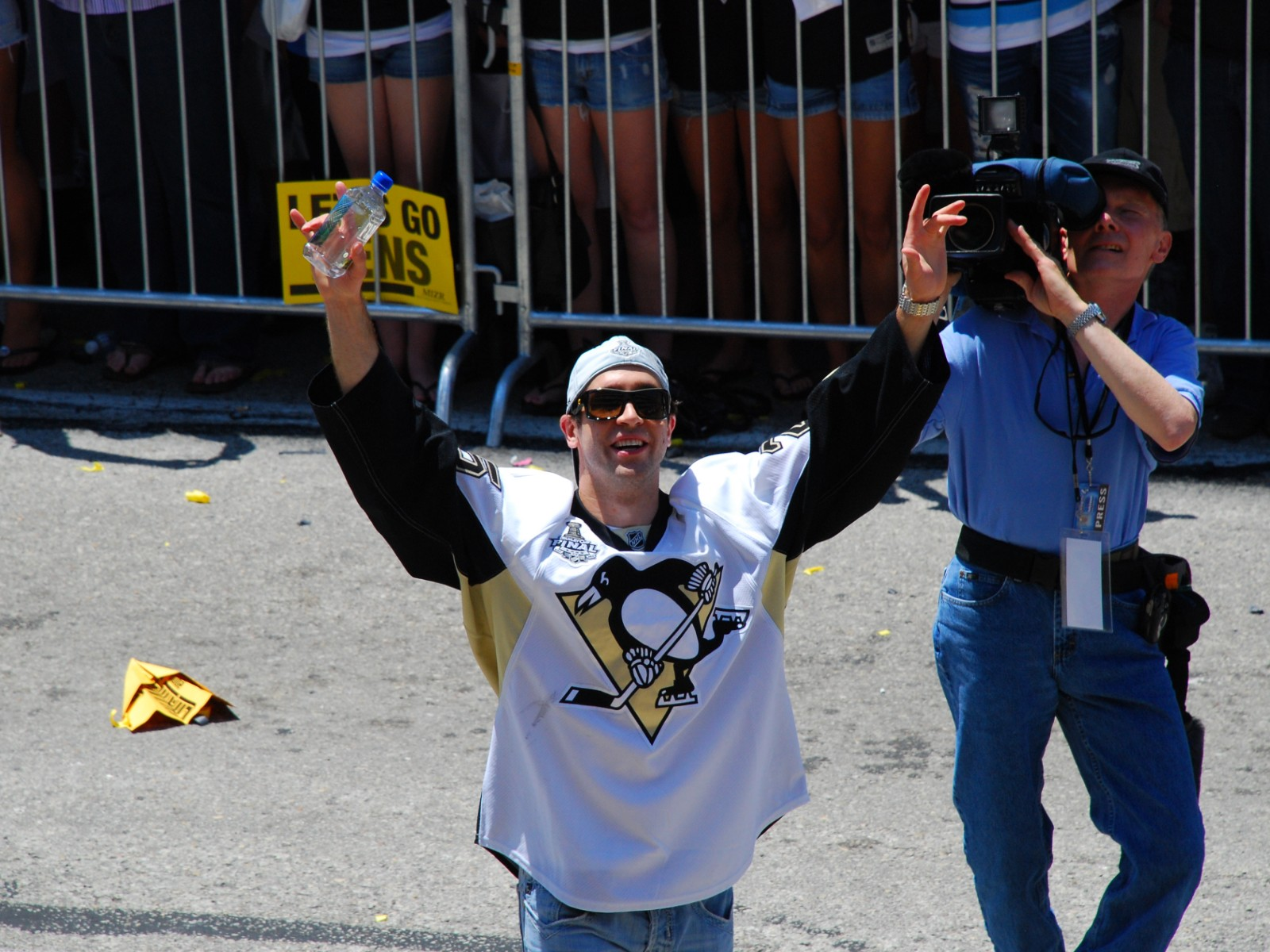
Talbot at the Pittsburgh Penguins Stanley Cup parade on June 15, 2009

Midway through the final year of his initial contract with the Penguins, 2008–09, on December 19, 2008, Talbot signed a new two-year contract with Pittsburgh through to the end of the 2010–11 season. The Penguins returned to the Stanley Cup Final for the second consecutive year against Detroit. Talbot scored both of the Penguins' goals in the seventh and deciding game of the series to capture Pittsburgh's third Stanley Cup.

For the 2009–10 season, Talbot served as the Penguins' representative to the National Hockey League Players' Association (NHLPA), a position he took over from Matt Cooke.

While playing for the Penguins, Talbot has appeared in numerous television commercials, including Valley Pool and Spa, City of Champions Crunch cereal (which featured Talbot on one side of the box and Pittsburgh Steeler Hines Ward on the other) and three commercials for Pittsburgh A&L Motor Sales (these A&L commercials have earned him the nickname "Superstar"). He also appeared in a Reebok commercial with teammate Sidney Crosby, which aired during the 2010 NHL Winter Classic.

While promoting the 2011 NHL Winter Classic, Talbot called-out Washington Capitals captain Alexander Ovechkin during an interview with a Pittsburgh radio station, calling him "a real douche".

=== Philadelphia Flyers and Colorado Avalanche ===
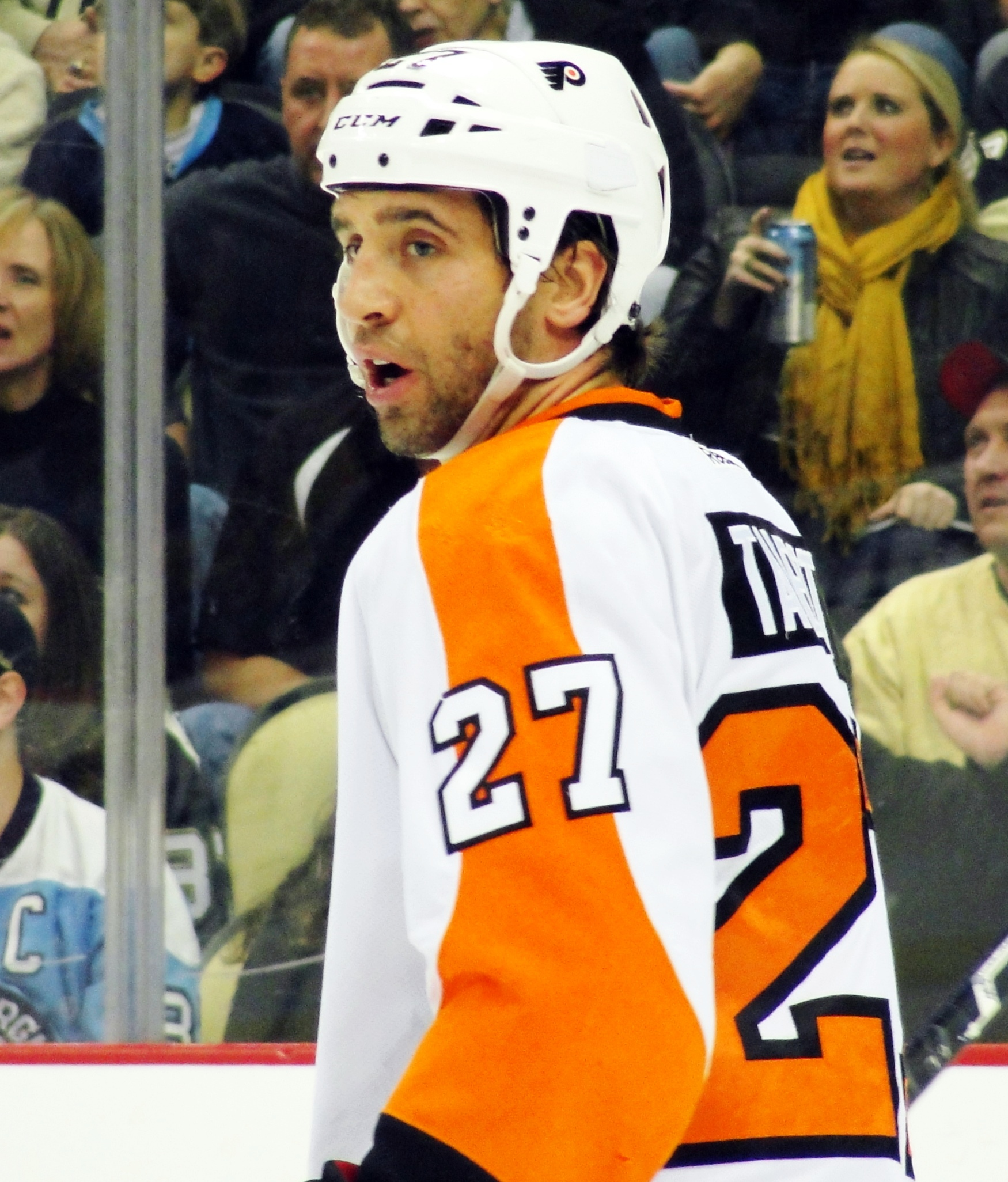
Talbot returns to Pittsburgh as a member of the Philadelphia Flyers, December 2011

After being unable to come to terms with the Penguins on a new contract, Talbot signed a five-year, $8.75 million contract with the Penguins' in-state rival Philadelphia Flyers on July 1, 2011. On December 29, 2011, during a 4–2 Philadelphia victory, Talbot scored an empty net goal in his first game back in Pittsburgh against the Penguins since signing with the Flyers. He would finish his first season in Philadelphia appearing in 81 regular season games, scoring 19 goals and 15 assists for a total of 34 points; all three statistics were NHL career-highs for Talbot. Talbot and the Flyers would ultimately face the Penguins in the Eastern Conference Quarterfinals of the 2012 playoffs, a series that saw the Flyers defeat the Penguins in six games. Talbot scored four goals during the series, two of which were short-handed.

After the first month of the 2013–14 season with the Flyers, on October 31, 2013, Talbot was traded to the Colorado Avalanche in exchange for Steve Downie. On December 6, 2013, Talbot scored his first Avalanche goal in a 3–2 win over the Calgary Flames.

=== Boston Bruins ===
With the Avalanche on the outside of the 2015 playoff picture, Talbot was traded at the NHL trade deadline on March 2, 2015, (along with Paul Carey) to the Boston Bruins in exchange for Jordan Caron and a sixth-round pick in the 2016 NHL entry draft.

On December 21, 2015, the NHL announced that it was suspending Talbot for two games because of a hit on New Jersey Devils forward Jiří Tlustý in a game played the day prior.

=== Kontinental Hockey League ===
At the conclusion of his contract with the Bruins, and as an impending free agent, Talbot opted to continue his playing career abroad in the Kontinental Hockey League (KHL), agreeing to a one-year deal with Russian club Lokomotiv Yaroslavl on May 27, 2016. Talbot played two seasons with Lokomotiv before leaving as a free agent and signing a one-year contract on August 25, 2018, to remain in the KHL with Avangard Omsk for the 2018–19 season.

== International play ==
Medal record

Representing Canada

Ice hockey

World Junior Championships
Silver medal – second place	2004 Canada	

Talbot helped Canada win a silver medal as an alternate captain during the 2004 World Junior Championships held in Helsinki.

In 2016, Talbot was a member of Team Canada at the 2016 Deutschland Cup.

== Personal life ==
Talbot's father, Serge, is a construction worker; his mother Lucie is a high school teacher. Talbot has two older brothers, Will and Frank.

Talbot married Canadian former figure skating champion Cynthia Phaneuf on July 11, 2014. The couple have three children.

== Career statistics ==
=== Regular season and playoffs ===
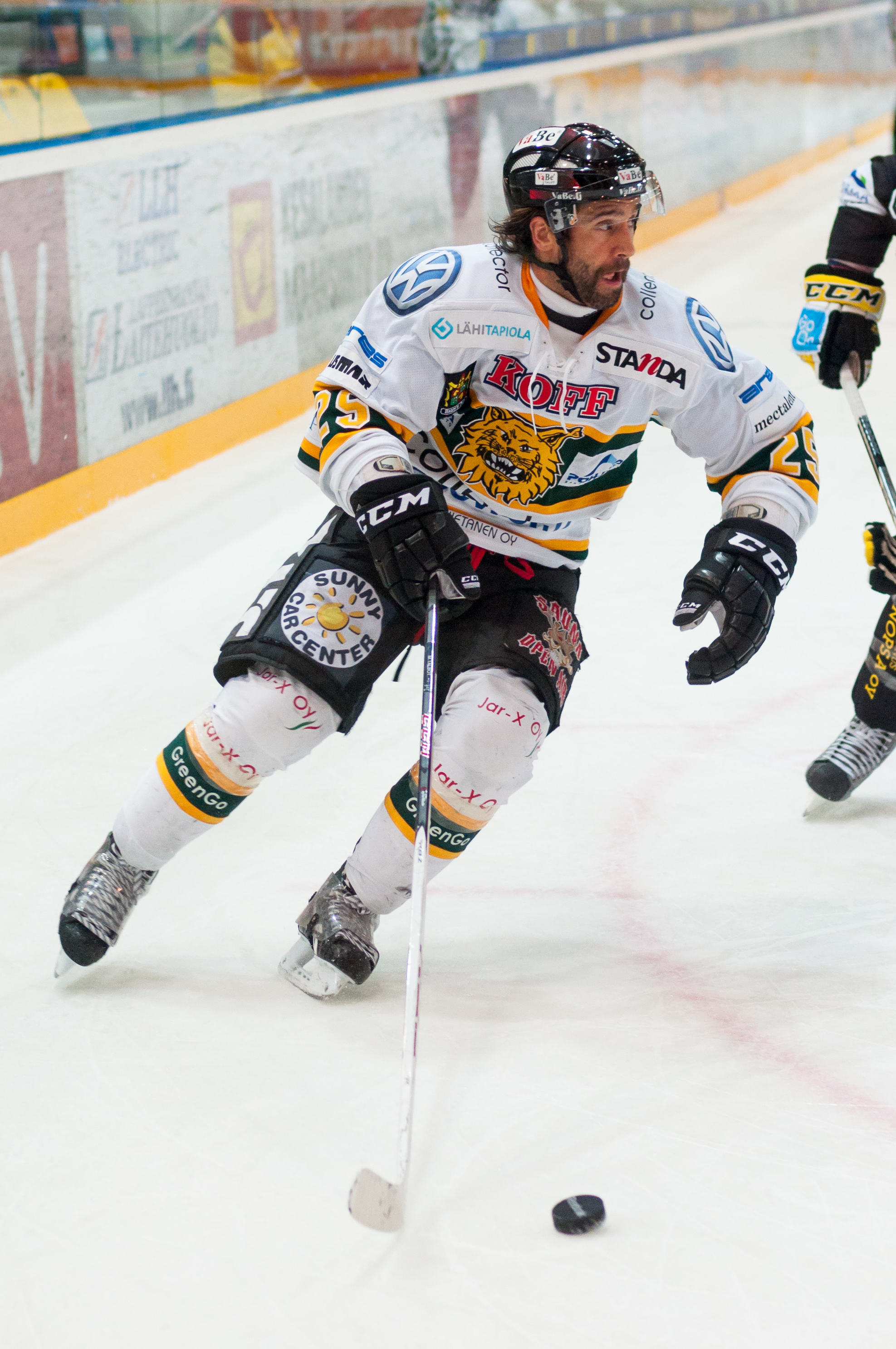
Maxime Talbot playing for Tampereen Ilves during the 2012 NHL lock-out

			Regular season					Playoffs
Season	Team	League	GP	G	A	Pts	PIM	GP	G	A	Pts	PIM
1999–2000	Collège Antoine–Girouard	QMAAA	42	19	21	40	32	7	3	6	9	0
2000–01	Rouyn–Noranda Huskies	QMJHL	40	9	15	24	78	—	—	—	—	—
2000–01	Hull Olympiques	QMJHL	24	6	7	13	60	5	1	0	1	2
2001–02	Hull Olympiques	QMJHL	65	24	36	60	174	12	4	6	10	51
2002–03	Hull Olympiques	QMJHL	69	46	58	104	130	20	14	30	44	33
2003–04	Gatineau Olympiques	QMJHL	51	25	73	98	41	15	11	16	27	0
2004–05	Wilkes–Barre/Scranton Penguins	AHL	75	7	12	19	62	11	0	1	1	22
2005–06	Pittsburgh Penguins	NHL	48	5	3	8	59	—	—	—	—	—
2005–06	Wilkes–Barre/Scranton Penguins	AHL	42	12	20	32	80	11	3	6	9	16
2006–07	Pittsburgh Penguins	NHL	75	13	11	24	53	5	0	1	1	7
2006–07	Wilkes–Barre/Scranton Penguins	AHL	5	4	0	4	2	—	—	—	—	—
2007–08	Pittsburgh Penguins	NHL	63	12	14	26	53	17	3	6	9	36
2008–09	Pittsburgh Penguins	NHL	75	12	10	22	63	24	8	5	13	19
2009–10	Pittsburgh Penguins	NHL	45	2	5	7	30	13	2	4	6	11
2010–11	Pittsburgh Penguins	NHL	82	8	13	21	66	7	1	3	4	14
2011–12	Philadelphia Flyers	NHL	81	19	15	34	59	11	4	2	6	10
2012–13	Ilves	SM-l	12	3	3	6	34	—	—	—	—	—
2012–13	Philadelphia Flyers	NHL	35	5	5	10	23	—	—	—	—	—
2013–14	Philadelphia Flyers	NHL	11	1	1	2	2	—	—	—	—	—
2013–14	Colorado Avalanche	NHL	70	7	18	25	43	7	0	0	0	4
2014–15	Colorado Avalanche	NHL	63	5	10	15	27	—	—	—	—	—
2014–15	Boston Bruins	NHL	18	0	3	3	2	—	—	—	—	—
2015–16	Boston Bruins	NHL	38	2	5	7	15	—	—	—	—	—
2015–16	Providence Bruins	AHL	26	10	11	21	14	3	0	1	1	2
2016–17	Lokomotiv Yaroslavl	KHL	60	15	21	36	63	15	5	2	7	17
2017–18	Lokomotiv Yaroslavl	KHL	43	8	11	19	65	9	0	1	1	12
2018–19	Avangard Omsk	KHL	42	4	6	10	14	5	1	1	2	2
NHL totals			704	91	113	204	495	84	18	21	39	101

=== International ===
Year	Team	Event	Result	GP	G	A	Pts	PIM
2001	Canada Quebec	U17	5th	5	1	2	3	2
2004	Canada	WJC	2nd place, silver medalist(s)	6	0	3	3	2
Junior totals				11	1	5	6	4

== Awards and honours ==
Awards	Year
QMJHL
Second All-Star Team	2003, 2004
Guy Lafleur Trophy	2003, 2004
President's Cup (Hull/Gatineau Olympiques)	2003, 2004
NHL
Stanley Cup (Pittsburgh Penguins)	2009
