= Guy Lafleur Trophy =

Ice hockey award

The Guy Lafleur Trophy (French: Trophée Guy Lafleur) is awarded annually to the Most Valuable Player in the Quebec Maritimes Junior Hockey League (QMJHL) playoffs. It is named for Hockey Hall of Fame inductee and QMJHL alumnus Guy Lafleur.

== Winners ==
Season	Player	Team
1977–78	Richard David	Trois-Rivières Draveurs
1978–79	Jean-Francois Sauve	Trois-Rivières Draveurs
1979–80	Dale Hawerchuk	Cornwall Royals
1980–81	Alain Lemieux	Trois-Rivières Draveurs
1981–82	Michel Morissette	Sherbrooke Castors
1982–83	Pat LaFontaine	Verdun Juniors
1983–84	Mario Lemieux	Laval Voisins
1984–85	Claude Lemieux	Verdun Junior Canadiens
1985–86	Sylvain Côté & Luc Robitaille	Hull Olympiques
1986–87	Marc Saumier	Longueuil Chevaliers
1987–88	Marc Saumier	Hull Olympiques
1988–89	Donald Audette	Laval Titan
1989–90	Denis Chalifoux	Laval Titan
1990–91	Felix Potvin	Chicoutimi Saguenéens
1991–92	Robert Guillet	Verdun Collège Français
1992–93	Manny Fernandez	Laval Titan
1993–94	Eric Fichaud	Chicoutimi Saguenéens
1994–95	Jose Theodore	Hull Olympiques
1995–96	Jason Doig	Granby Prédateurs
1996–97	Christian Bronsard	Hull Olympiques
1997–98	Jean-Pierre Dumont	Val-d'Or Foreurs
1998–99	Mathieu Benoit	Acadie–Bathurst Titan
1999–2000	Brad Richards	Rimouski Océanic
2000–01	Simon Gamache	Val-d'Or Foreurs
2001–02	Danny Groulx	Victoriaville Tigres
2002–03	Maxime Talbot	Hull Olympiques
2003–04	Maxime Talbot	Gatineau Olympiques
2004–05	Sidney Crosby	Rimouski Océanic
2005–06	Martin Karsums	Moncton Wildcats
2006–07	Jonathan Bernier	Lewiston Maineiacs
2007–08	Claude Giroux	Gatineau Olympiques
2008–09	Yannick Riendeau	Drummondville Voltigeurs
2009–10	Gabriel Bourque	Moncton Wildcats
2010–11	Jonathan Huberdeau	Saint John Sea Dogs
2011–12	Charlie Coyle	Saint John Sea Dogs
2012–13	Jonathan Drouin	Halifax Mooseheads
2013–14	Antoine Bibeau	Val-d'Or Foreurs
2014–15	Adam Erne	Quebec Remparts
2015–16	Francis Perron	Rouyn-Noranda Huskies
2016–17	Thomas Chabot	Saint John Sea Dogs
2017–18	Jeffrey Viel	Acadie–Bathurst Titan
2018–19	Noah Dobson	Rouyn-Noranda Huskies
2019–20	Playoffs cancelled due to the coronavirus pandemic – trophy not awarded	
2020–21	Benjamin Tardif	Victoriaville Tigres
2021–22	Mavrik Bourque	Shawinigan Cataractes
2022–23	James Malatesta	Quebec Remparts
2023–24	Vsevolod Komarov	Drummondville Voltigeurs
2024–25	Caleb Desnoyers	Moncton Wildcats
2025–26	Gabe Smith	Moncton Wildcats
