= Stéphane Quintal =

Canadian ice hockey player (born 1968)

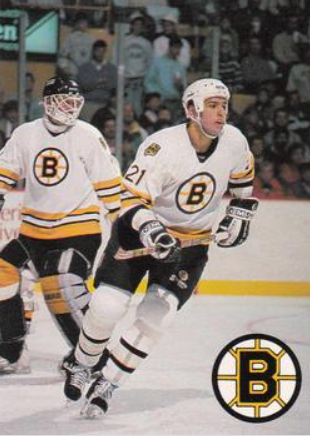
- Born: October 22, 1968 (age 58) Boucherville, Quebec, Canada
- Height: 6 ft 3 in (191 cm)
- Weight: 230 lb (104 kg; 16 st 6 lb)
- Position: Defence
- Shot: Right
- Played for: Boston Bruins; St. Louis Blues; Winnipeg Jets; Montreal Canadiens; New York Rangers; Chicago Blackhawks; Serie A HC Asiago
- National team: Canada
- NHL draft: 14th overall, 1987; Boston Bruins
- Playing career: 1988–2005

Stéphane Yvon Quintal (born October 22, 1968) is a Canadian former professional ice hockey player who played in the National Hockey League (NHL) for 16 seasons. He served as senior vice president of player safety for the NHL from 2014 to 2016.

== Playing career ==
Quintal played 16 NHL seasons before retiring as a player in August 2005. He had been the last Montreal Canadiens player to wear number 5 before the Canadiens retired it in honour of Bernie "Boom-Boom" Geoffrion.

Quintal joined the Department of Player Safety, one of the NHL's disciplinary arms, at its creation at the opening of the 2011–12 season. The head of the department was initially Brendan Shanahan, who left his position after the completion of the 2013–14 regular season to become president of the Toronto Maple Leafs. At the time, Quintal became the head of the department on an interim basis. On September 8, 2014, the NHL named Quintal the permanent head of the department with the title of senior vice president of player safety. Quintal continued Shanahan's practice of releasing videos explaining his rulings on plays that were sent to the league office for review. However, he only narrated French-language videos for incidents involving the Canadiens or Ottawa Senators, a practice dating to when Shanahan ran the department. All other videos were narrated by a deputy, Patrick Burke. He held the post until 2016, when he was succeeded by George Parros.

== Career statistics ==
=== Regular season and playoffs ===
			Regular season					Playoffs
Season	Team	League	GP	G	A	Pts	PIM	GP	G	A	Pts	PIM
1984–85	Richelieu Riverains	QMAAA	41	1	10	11	68	9	0	5	5	27
1985–86	Granby Bisons	QMJHL	67	2	17	19	152	—	—	—	—	—
1986–87	Granby Bisons	QMJHL	67	13	41	54	178	8	0	9	9	10
1987–88	Granby Bisons	QMJHL	23	7	14	21	91	—	—	—	—	—
1987–88	Hull Olympiques	QMJHL	15	6	9	15	47	19	7	12	19	30
1987–88	Hull Olympiques	MC	—	—	—	—	—	4	2	1	3	0
1988–89	Boston Bruins	NHL	26	0	1	1	29	—	—	—	—	—
1988–89	Maine Mariners	AHL	16	4	10	14	28	—	—	—	—	—
1989–90	Boston Bruins	NHL	38	2	2	4	22	—	—	—	—	—
1989–90	Maine Mariners	AHL	37	4	16	20	27	—	—	—	—	—
1990–91	Boston Bruins	NHL	45	2	6	8	89	3	0	1	1	7
1990–91	Maine Mariners	AHL	23	1	5	6	30	—	—	—	—	—
1991–92	Boston Bruins	NHL	49	4	10	14	77	—	—	—	—	—
1991–92	St. Louis Blues	NHL	26	0	6	6	32	4	1	2	3	6
1992–93	St. Louis Blues	NHL	75	1	10	11	100	9	0	0	0	8
1993–94	Winnipeg Jets	NHL	81	8	18	26	119	—	—	—	—	—
1994–95	Winnipeg Jets	NHL	43	6	17	23	78	—	—	—	—	—
1995–96	Montreal Canadiens	NHL	68	2	14	16	117	6	0	1	1	6
1996–97	Montreal Canadiens	NHL	71	7	15	22	100	5	0	1	1	6
1997–98	Montreal Canadiens	NHL	71	6	10	16	97	9	0	2	2	4
1998–99	Montreal Canadiens	NHL	82	8	19	27	84	—	—	—	—	—
1999–2000	New York Rangers	NHL	75	2	14	16	77	—	—	—	—	—
2000–01	Chicago Blackhawks	NHL	72	1	18	19	60	—	—	—	—	—
2001–02	Montreal Canadiens	NHL	75	6	10	16	87	12	1	3	4	12
2002–03	Montreal Canadiens	NHL	67	5	5	10	70	—	—	—	—	—
2003–04	Montreal Canadiens	NHL	73	3	5	8	82	4	0	0	0	2
2004–05	Asiago Hockey	ITA	10	1	2	3	4	5	2	0	2	4
NHL totals			1,037	63	180	243	1,320	52	2	10	12	51

=== International ===
Year	Team	Event	GP	G	A	Pts	PIM
1999	Canada	WC	10	3	2	5	4

== Director of Player Safety ==
After taking over the job from Brendan Shanahan on April 11, 2014, Quintal was quickly faced with a repeat offender in the form of Minnesota Wild forward Matt Cooke. Cooke had kneed Colorado Avalanche defenseman Tyson Barrie during round one of the 2014 playoffs, ending his season. Cooke received a 7-game suspension and returned for round two of the playoffs.

== Transactions ==
- February 7, 1992: Traded by the Boston Bruins, along with Craig Janney, to the St. Louis Blues in exchange for Adam Oates.
- September 24, 1993: Traded by the St. Louis Blues, along with Nelson Emerson, to the Winnipeg Jets in exchange for Phil Housley.
- July 8, 1995: Traded by the Winnipeg Jets to the Montreal Canadiens in exchange for Montreal's 1995 2nd round draft choice.
- July 13, 1999: Signed as a free agent with the New York Rangers.
- October 5, 2000: Claimed on waivers by the Chicago Blackhawks from the New York Rangers.
- June 23, 2001: Traded by the Chicago Blackhawks to the Montreal Canadiens in exchange for Montreal's 2001 4th round draft choice.
- June 27, 2004: Traded by the Montreal Canadiens to the Los Angeles Kings in exchange for future considerations.

== Awards and achievements ==
- QMJHL First All-Star Team (1987)

== See also ==
- List of NHL players with 1,000 games played

Preceded by Glen Wesley	Boston Bruins first-round draft pick 1987	Succeeded by Robert Cimetta
