= Martin Gélinas =

Canadian ice hockey player (born 1970)

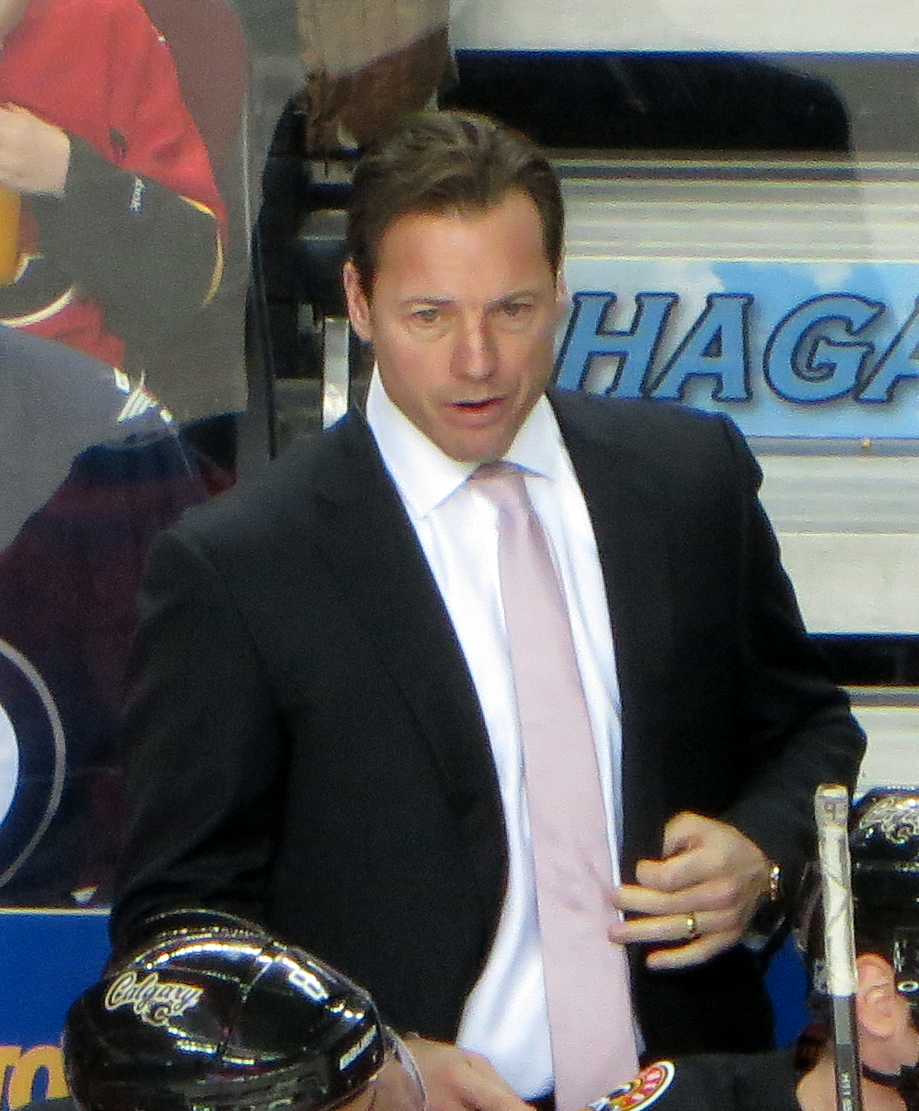
- Gélinas with the Calgary Flames in 2014
- Born: June 5, 1970 (age 56) Shawinigan, Quebec, Canada
- Height: 6 ft 1 in (185 cm)
- Weight: 190 lb (86 kg; 13 st 8 lb)
- Position: Left wing
- Shot: Left
- Played for: Edmonton Oilers; Quebec Nordiques; Vancouver Canucks; Carolina Hurricanes; Calgary Flames; HC Lugano; Florida Panthers; Nashville Predators; SC Bern
- National team: Canada
- NHL draft: 7th overall, 1988; Los Angeles Kings
- Playing career: 1988–2008

Martin Gélinas (French pronunciation: [ʒeliˈna]; born June 5, 1970) is a Canadian former professional ice hockey forward who played 1,273 games in the National Hockey League (NHL) for the Edmonton Oilers, Quebec Nordiques, Vancouver Canucks, Carolina Hurricanes, Calgary Flames, Florida Panthers and Nashville Predators. A first-round selection of the Los Angeles Kings at the 1988 NHL entry draft, Gélinas was sent to the Oilers as part of the 1988 Wayne Gretzky trade before ever playing a game for the Kings.

Gélinas reached the Stanley Cup Final with four teams. He was a member of Edmonton's 1990 championship team and also reached the Finals in 1994 with Vancouver, 2002 with Carolina and 2004 with Calgary. He tied a record in 2004 by scoring three series-winning goals in one playoff year, earning him the nickname "the Eliminator". After playing his final professional season with SC Bern in the Swiss National League A (NLA), Gélinas turned to coaching and player development. He was named an assistant coach with the Calgary Flames in 2012.

== Playing career ==
=== Junior ===
Gélinas played two seasons of junior hockey in the Quebec Major Junior Hockey League (QMJHL) for the Hull Olympiques between 1987 and 1989. He scored 101 goals and 107 assists in 106 games. In his first year, 1987–88, Gélinas finished 10th in QMJHL scoring with 131 points. He won the Michel Bergeron Trophy as offensive rookie of the year and was named Canadian Hockey League rookie of the year in addition to being named a QMJHL first-team all-star. Gélinas added 32 points in 17 playoff games as the Olympiques defeated the Drummondville Voltigeurs in the final to win the President's Cup. At the 1988 Memorial Cup, Gélinas won the George Parsons Trophy as the most sportsmanlike player of the tournament.

The National Hockey League (NHL) Central Scouting Bureau ranked Gélinas as the eighth best prospect at the 1988 NHL entry draft. He was selected by the Los Angeles Kings with the seventh overall pick. Gélinas never played for the Kings as on August 9, 1988, he was included in one of the most significant trades in NHL history. The Edmonton Oilers sent Wayne Gretzky, Mike Krushelnyski and Marty McSorley to the Kings in exchange for Gélinas, Jimmy Carson, three first round draft picks and $15 million in cash.

As one of the key players coming to Edmonton in what he later called "the biggest trade in sports history", Gélinas endured the scrutiny of the Canadian media and pressure created by angry and disappointed fans after the Oilers dealt away a player in Gretzky who was considered a national icon. Gélinas began the 1988–89 season with the Oilers and made his NHL debut and scored his first point, on an assist, on October 7, 1988, against the New York Islanders. He scored his first goal ten days later against Jon Casey of the Minnesota North Stars but he was returned to Hull after six games to complete his second season of junior hockey. Making his international debut, Gélinas played with the Canadian national junior team at the 1989 World Junior Ice Hockey Championships. He recorded two assists in seven games for the fourth place Canadians.

=== Edmonton, Quebec, Vancouver and Carolina ===
Joining the Oilers full-time in 1989–90, Gélinas recorded 25 points in 46 games. At the age of 19, he was a member of Edmonton's "Kid Line" playing alongside 22-year-olds Joe Murphy and Adam Graves. The trio provided an offensive boost in the post-season as the Oilers reached the 1990 Stanley Cup Final against the Boston Bruins. Edmonton won the best-of-seven championship series four games to one and captured the Stanley Cup. After recording 40 points in 1990–91, Gélinas scored only 29 points the following season. The Quebec Nordiques, who had been criticized by local fans and media for failing to select Gélinas at the 1988 draft, attempted to acquire him in exchange for Bryan Fogarty. The deal failed to materialize and Gélinas remained with the Oilers for the 1992–93 season where his offensive production again declined, to 23 points.

The Nordiques finally acquired Gélinas on June 20, 1993, in exchange for Scott Pearson. He lasted only 31 games with Quebec before being placed on waivers and claimed by the Vancouver Canucks. After scoring 16 points in 33 games to end the 1993–94 regular season with Vancouver, Gélinas added nine points in 24 playoff games. The Canucks reached the 1994 Stanley Cup Final but were defeated in seven games by the New York Rangers. In the lockout-shortened 1994–95 season, he scored 23 points in 46 games and won his first of two consecutive Fred J. Hume Awards as Vancouver's "unsung hero". Gélinas finally achieved the offensive production expected of him when he was drafted by recording consecutive 30-goal seasons. He scored 30 goals in 1995–96 and led the Canucks with 35 goals, was second to Alexander Mogilny with 68 points and recorded a four-goal game against the Phoenix Coyotes in 1996–97. He won three team awards: The Cyclone Taylor Award as Vancouver's most valuable player, the Molson Cup for earning the most three star selections and the Most Exciting Player Award.

A collision with Edmonton's Dan McGillis early in the 1997–98 season forced Gélinas out of the lineup with a sprained knee. He missed 16 games due to the injury and had only eight points in 24 games played. His tenure with the Canucks ended January 3, 1998. He was traded, along with Kirk McLean to the Carolina Hurricanes in exchange for Sean Burke, Geoff Sanderson and Enrico Ciccone. Gélinas was added to Carolina's roster to add a physical presence to the team and improve the team at both ends of the ice. He finished the season with 24 points in 40 games with the Hurricanes, and was invited to join Team Canada for the 1998 World Championship. Gélinas scored one goal for the sixth-place Canadians.

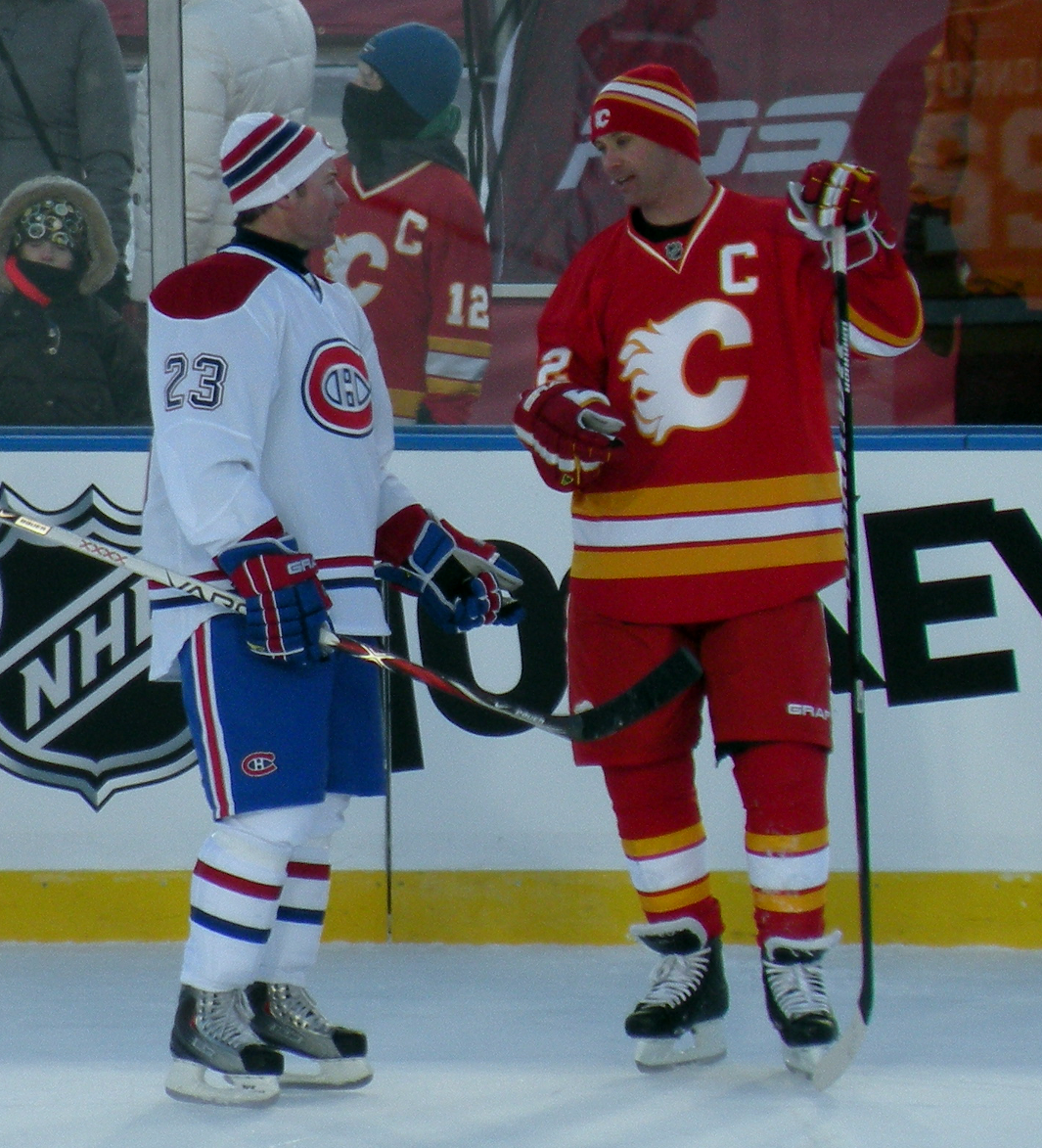
Gelinas (left) talks with former teammate Craig Conroy during the alumni game at the 2011 Heritage Classic.

Placed in a defensive role, Gélinas's offensive statistics fell to 28 points in 1998–99 and 30 in 1999–2000. The Hurricanes placed him on waivers late in the latter season, but remained with the team after he went unclaimed. His teammates expressed relief that he hadn't been moved the following season as, after improving to 59 points, Gélinas scored the game-winning goal to clinch a playoff spot for Carolina. He recorded only one assist in six post-season games, then accepted a lessened role with the Hurricanes as he was placed on the third line in 2001–02. Gélinas led the Hurricanes to their first Stanley Cup Final in franchise history after scoring the overtime-winning goal in the sixth game of the Eastern Conference final to eliminate the Toronto Maple Leafs. Carolina fell to the Detroit Red Wings in five games in the 2002 Stanley Cup Final.

=== Calgary, Florida and Nashville ===
Gélinas chose to decline his contract option for 2002–03 and left Carolina as a free agent. He signed a contract with the Calgary Flames on July 2, 2002. A 52-point season was fourth best on the Flames and included his 500th career point, a game-winning goal against the Detroit Red Wings on January 25, 2003. Gélinas reached another career milestone during the 2003–04 season as he played in his 1,000th NHL game on December 9 against the Minnesota Wild. His 35 points on the season was again fourth-best on the team.

In qualifying for the 2004 Stanley Cup Playoffs, the Flames reached the post-season for the first time in eight seasons. With eight goals and 15 points in the playoffs, Gélinas emerged as one of Calgary's post-season heroes. He scored the series-winning goal in overtime of game seven of the Flames' first round series against Vancouver. The victory advanced Calgary to the second round of the playoffs for the first time in 15 years. Gélinas also scored the overtime goal that eliminated Detroit in six games, which made him the first player in NHL history to score three series-winning goals in overtime. He then became the second player in NHL history to score three series-clinching goals in one playoff year by tallying the goal that eliminated the San Jose Sharks and propelled the Flames into the 2004 Stanley Cup Final. His heroics throughout the post-season resulted in Gélinas being called "the Eliminator".

The Flames' Cinderella run ended in the Cup Finals as the Tampa Bay Lightning won the series in seven games. The result was controversial as Gélinas appeared to have scored the tie-breaking goal in the sixth game that would have won the Stanley Cup for Calgary had the score held up. Television replays of the play using the standard broadcast camera angle showed that the puck deflected off Gélinas' skate and appeared to be across the goal line before Tampa goaltender Nikolai Khabibulin kicked it out of the net. The referees did not signal a goal, however, and no video review was requested. Tampa Bay went on to win the game in overtime.

As the 2004–05 NHL season went unplayed due to a labour dispute, Gélinas spent the season in Switzerland. He played one regular season and five playoff games with HC Lugano in the Nationalliga A (NLA), but otherwise spent the season with HC Forward-Morges in the Nationalliga B (NLB) where he scored 37 goals in 41 games and recorded 58 points. A free agent when the NHL resumed play in 2005–06, Gélinas signed a two-year contract with the Florida Panthers. Brought in as a capable veteran, he played all 82 games for Florida and scored over 40 points in each season. Gélinas scored his 300th career goal in Florida's final game of the 2006–07 season.

Leaving Florida, Gélinas signed with the Nashville Predators for the 2007–08 season. He had 20 points in 57 games before suffering a torn anterior cruciate ligament on February 21, 2008, game against the Vancouver Canucks that was ultimately his final contest in the NHL. Gélinas returned to Switzerland 2008–09 as he signed a contract to play with SC Bern in the NLA. In 27 games, he scored 15 goals and 22 points. He retired following the season. In his NHL career, Gélinas played 1,273 regular season games and added 147 in the playoffs. His former junior team, now known as the Gatineau Olympiques, retired his uniform number 20 in 2012.

== Coaching career ==
The Nashville Predators hired Gélinas as their director of player development in 2009. He had spent the final years of his playing career mentoring younger teammates, and Predators general manager David Poile praised him as being an ideal person for the role: "we will depend on Martin and his experience, work ethic and professionalism to help develop our prospects into NHL players". Spending up to 20 days per month on the road, he often served in a coaching capacity by assisting players during practices when visiting Nashville's farm club, the Milwaukee Admirals. He carried that experience back to Calgary in 2012 when he was hired as the Flames' assistant coach under Bob Hartley. One of Gélinas' duties with the team was to work with the special teams units, both the power play and the penalty kill.

== Personal life ==
A native of Shawinigan-Sud, Quebec, Gélinas is the son of René Gélinas and Lise Lebel. His father was a barber in Shawinigan-Sud. As a youth, Gélinas played in the 1983 Quebec International Pee-Wee Hockey Tournament with the Shawinigan Cats minor ice hockey team.

Gélinas and his wife Jane have three children: son Matthew and daughters Cameron and Morgan. The family have made Calgary their permanent home since he first signed with the Flames in 2002. Matthew is also a hockey player, and in 2013–14 was in junior as a member of the Tri-City Americans.

Active with charitable endeavours throughout his career, Gélinas was named the recipient of the Ralph T. Scurfield Humanitarian Award in 2004. A Calgary Flames team award, it is given to the player who best combines on-ice leadership with a dedication to community service. He is involved with the Calgary Flames Alumni Association's charitable events. Gélinas is also involved with Calgary's business industry, holding an interest in Calgary-based Whitecap Resources.

== Career statistics ==
=== Regular season and playoffs ===
			Regular season					Playoffs
Season	Team	League	GP	G	A	Pts	PIM	GP	G	A	Pts	PIM
1986–87	Cantons de l'Est Cantonniers	QMAAA	41	36	42	78	36	7	7	5	12	2
1987–88	Hull Olympiques	QMJHL	65	63	68	131	74	17	15	18	33	32
1988–89	Hull Olympiques	QMJHL	41	38	39	77	31	9	5	4	9	14
1988–89	Edmonton Oilers	NHL	6	1	2	3	0	—	—	—	—	—
1989–90	Edmonton Oilers	NHL	46	17	8	25	30	20	2	3	5	6
1990–91	Edmonton Oilers	NHL	73	20	20	40	34	18	3	6	9	25
1991–92	Edmonton Oilers	NHL	68	11	18	29	62	15	1	3	4	10
1992–93	Edmonton Oilers	NHL	65	11	12	23	30	—	—	—	—	—
1993–94	Quebec Nordiques	NHL	31	6	6	12	8	—	—	—	—	—
1993–94	Vancouver Canucks	NHL	33	8	8	16	26	24	5	4	9	14
1994–95	Vancouver Canucks	NHL	46	13	10	23	36	3	0	1	1	0
1995–96	Vancouver Canucks	NHL	81	30	26	56	59	6	1	1	2	12
1996–97	Vancouver Canucks	NHL	74	35	33	68	42	—	—	—	—	—
1997–98	Vancouver Canucks	NHL	24	4	4	8	10	—	—	—	—	—
1997–98	Carolina Hurricanes	NHL	40	12	14	26	30	—	—	—	—	—
1998–99	Carolina Hurricanes	NHL	76	13	15	28	67	6	0	3	3	2
1999–00	Carolina Hurricanes	NHL	81	14	16	30	40	—	—	—	—	—
2000–01	Carolina Hurricanes	NHL	79	23	29	52	59	6	0	1	1	6
2001–02	Carolina Hurricanes	NHL	72	13	16	29	30	23	3	4	7	10
2002–03	Calgary Flames	NHL	81	21	31	52	51	—	—	—	—	—
2003–04	Calgary Flames	NHL	76	17	18	35	70	26	8	7	15	35
2004–05	HC Lugano	NLA	1	0	0	0	0	—	—	—	—	—
2004–05	HC Forward-Morges	NLB	41	38	23	61	81	—	—	—	—	—
2005–06	Florida Panthers	NHL	82	17	24	41	80	—	—	—	—	—
2006–07	Florida Panthers	NHL	82	14	30	44	36	—	—	—	—	—
2007–08	Nashville Predators	NHL	57	9	11	20	20	—	—	—	—	—
2008–09	SC Bern	NLA	27	15	7	22	45	6	2	2	4	6
NHL totals			1,273	309	351	660	820	147	23	33	56	120

=== International ===
Year	Team	Event	GP	G	A	Pts	PIM
1989	Canada	WJC	7	0	2	2	8
1998	Canada	WC	6	1	0	1	6
Senior totals			6	1	0	1	6

== Awards and honours ==
Junior
Award	Year	Ref.
QMJHL First All-Star Team	1987–88	
Michel Bergeron Trophy; QMJHL offensive rookie of the year	1987–88	
CHL Rookie of the Year	1987–88	
George Parsons Trophy; Most sportsmanlike player of the Memorial Cup	1988	

National Hockey League
Award	Year	Ref.
Stanley Cup champion	1989–90	
Fred J. Hume Award; VAN – Unsung hero	1994–95; 1995–96	
Cyclone Taylor Award; VAN – Most Valuable Player	1996–97	
Molson Cup; VAN – Most three star selections	1996–97	
Vancouver Canucks Most Exciting Player Award	1996–97	
Ralph T. Scurfield Humanitarian Award; CGY – Humanitarianism	2003–04	

Preceded by Wayne McBean	Los Angeles Kings first-round draft pick 1988	Succeeded by Darryl Sydor
