= Stéphane Beauregard =

Canadian ice hockey player

- Born: January 10, 1968 (age 58) Cowansville, Quebec, Canada
- Height: 5 ft 11 in (180 cm)
- Weight: 190 lb (86 kg; 13 st 8 lb)
- Position: Goaltender
- Caught: Right
- Played for: Winnipeg Jets; Philadelphia Flyers
- NHL draft: 52nd overall, 1988; Winnipeg Jets
- Playing career: 1988–2000

Stéphane Beauregard (born January 10, 1968) is a Canadian former professional ice hockey goaltender who played five seasons in the National Hockey League (NHL) for the Winnipeg Jets and Philadelphia Flyers.

== Playing career ==
As a youth, he played in the 1981 Quebec International Pee-Wee Hockey Tournament with a minor ice hockey team from Saint-Jean-sur-Richelieu.

Drafted by the Winnipeg Jets in the third round, 52nd overall, in the 1988 NHL entry draft from the St. Jean Castors. In the 1992 off-season, he was traded three times, first to the Buffalo Sabres for Christian Ruuttu and future considerations on June 15, then to the Chicago Blackhawks for Dominik Hašek and future considerations (draft pick Éric Dazé) on August 10, and finally back to Winnipeg for Ruuttu. On October 1 of the same year, he was traded to the Philadelphia Flyers for future considerations. He was then traded back to the Jets by the Flyers for future considerations, June 11, 1993.

Most of his career was spent in the minor leagues. Guy Lafleur was his childhood idol.

He also played for the San Francisco Spiders in their only season of existence (1995–96), ultimately winning the James Gatschene Memorial Trophy as regular-season most valuable player.

Beauregard filled in for an injured Wendell Young to lead the Chicago Wolves to their first Turner Cup in 1997-98.

== Career statistics ==
			Regular season									Playoffs
Season	Team	League	GP	W	L	T	MIN	GA	SO	GAA	SV%	GP	W	L	MIN	GA	SO	GAA	SV%
1985–86	Richelieu Riverains	QAAA	21	10	11	0	1223	117	0	5.74	—	5	3	2	299	20	0	4.01	—
1986–87	Saint-Jean Castors	QMJHL	13	6	7	0	785	58	0	4.43	.890	5	1	3	260	26	0	6.0	.845
1987–88	Saint-Jean Castors	QMJHL	66	38	20	3	3766	229	2	3.65	.896	7	3	4	423	34	0	4.82	.870
1988–89	Moncton Hawks	AHL	15	4	8	2	824	62	0	4.51	.874	—	—	—	—	—	—	—	—
1988–89	Fort Wayne Komets	IHL	16	9	5	0	830	43	0	3.10	—	9	4	4	484	21	1	2.60	—
1989–90	Winnipeg Jets	NHL	17	7	8	3	1079	59	0	3.28	.896	4	1	3	238	12	0	3.02	.886
1989–90	Fort Wayne Komets	IHL	33	20	8	3	1949	115	0	3.54	.815	—	—	—	—	—	—	—	—
1990–91	Winnipeg Jets	NHL	16	3	10	1	836	55	0	3.95	.870	—	—	—	—	—	—	—	—
1990–91	Moncton Hawks	AHL	9	3	4	1	504	20	1	2.38	.908	1	1	0	60	1	0	1.00	—
1990–91	Fort Wayne Komets	IHL	32	14	13	2	1761	109	0	3.71	—	19	10	9	1158	57	0	2.95	—
1991–92	Winnipeg Jets	NHL	26	6	8	6	1267	61	2	2.89	.900	—	—	—	—	—	—	—	—
1992–93	Philadelphia Flyers	NHL	16	3	9	0	802	59	0	4.41	.854	—	—	—	—	—	—	—	—
1992–93	Hershey Bears	AHL	13	5	5	3	794	48	0	3.63	.889	—	—	—	—	—	—	—	—
1993–94	Winnipeg Jets	NHL	13	0	4	1	418	34	0	4.88	.839	—	—	—	—	—	—	—	—
1993–94	Moncton Hawks	AHL	37	18	11	6	2082	121	1	3.49	.885	21	12	9	1305	57	2	2.62	.906
1994–95	Springfield Falcons	AHL	24	10	11	3	1381	73	2	3.17	.892	—	—	—	—	—	—	—	—
1995–96	San Francisco Spiders	IHL	69	36	24	8	4022	207	1	3.09	.903	4	1	3	241	10	0	2.49	.941
1996–97	Quebec Rafales	IHL	67	35	20	11	3945	174	4	2.65	.906	9	5	3	498	19	0	2.29	.917
1997–98	Chicago Wolves	IHL	18	10	6	0	917	49	1	3.20	.881	14	10	4	820	36	1	2.63	.897
1998–99	HC Davos	NLA	45	—	—	—	2638	151	—	3.44	—	6	2	4	370	23	0	3.73	—
1999–00	SERC Wild Wings	DEL	58	—	—	—	3301	178	4	3.24	.891	—	—	—	—	—	—	—	—
NHL totals			90	19	39	11	4402	268	2	3.65	.879	4	1	3	238	12	0	3.02	.886
