= François Guay =

Canadian ice hockey player

- Born: June 8, 1968 (age 57) Gatineau, Quebec, Canada
- Height: 6 ft 0 in (183 cm)
- Weight: 190 lb (86 kg; 13 st 8 lb)
- Position: Centre
- Shot: Left
- Played for: Buffalo Sabres
- NHL draft: 152nd overall, 1986; Buffalo Sabres
- Playing career: 1988–2001

François Guay (born June 8, 1968) is a Canadian former professional ice hockey centre.

Guay was born in Gatineau, Quebec. As a youth, he played in the 1980 Quebec International Pee-Wee Hockey Tournament with a minor ice hockey team from Brossard.

He was drafted in the eighth round, 152nd overall, by the Buffalo Sabres in the 1986 NHL entry draft. He played just one game in the National Hockey League with the Sabres, appearing in a single contest during the 1989–90 season. He did not score a point.

== Career statistics ==
			Regular season					Playoffs
Season	Team	League	GP	G	A	Pts	PIM	GP	G	A	Pts	PIM
1984–85	Laval Voisins	QMJHL	66	13	18	31	21	—	—	—	—	—
1985–86	Laval Titan	QMJHL	71	19	55	74	46	14	5	6	11	15
1986–87	Laval Titan	QMJHL	63	52	76	128	67	14	5	13	18	18
1987–88	Laval Titan	QMJHL	66	60	83	143	142	14	10	16	26	10
1988–89	Rochester Americans	AHL	45	6	20	26	34	—	—	—	—	—
1989–90	Rochester Americans	AHL	69	28	35	63	39	16	4	8	12	12
1989–90	Buffalo Sabres	NHL	1	0	0	0	0	—	—	—	—	—
1990–91	Rochester Americans	AHL	61	24	39	63	38	15	5	5	10	8
1991–92	Innsbrucker EV	Austria	40	34	45	79	30	—	—	—	—	—
1992–93	Innsbrucker EV	Austria	53	43	59	102	65	—	—	—	—	—
1993–94	Klagenfurter AC	Austria	46	30	50	80	76	—	—	—	—	—
1994–95	SC Herisau	NLB	36	23	44	67	83	4	1	2	3	14
1995–96	SC Herisau	NLB	36	32	35	67	52	5	2	6	8	2
1996–97	Adler Mannheim	DEL	14	2	8	10	10	—	—	—	—	—
1997–98	Adler Mannheim	DEL	41	8	13	21	41	10	0	4	4	6
1998–99	Kassel Huskies	DEL	49	17	36	53	76	—	—	—	—	—
1999–00	Kassel Huskies	DEL	39	10	15	25	59	6	2	1	3	12
2000–01	Kassel Huskies	DEL	43	8	24	32	48	—	—	—	—	—
NHL totals			1	0	0	0	0	—	—	—	—	—
AHL totals			175	58	94	152	111	31	9	13	22	20

== See also ==
- List of players who played only one game in the NHL
