= Stéphan Lebeau =

Canadian ice hockey player

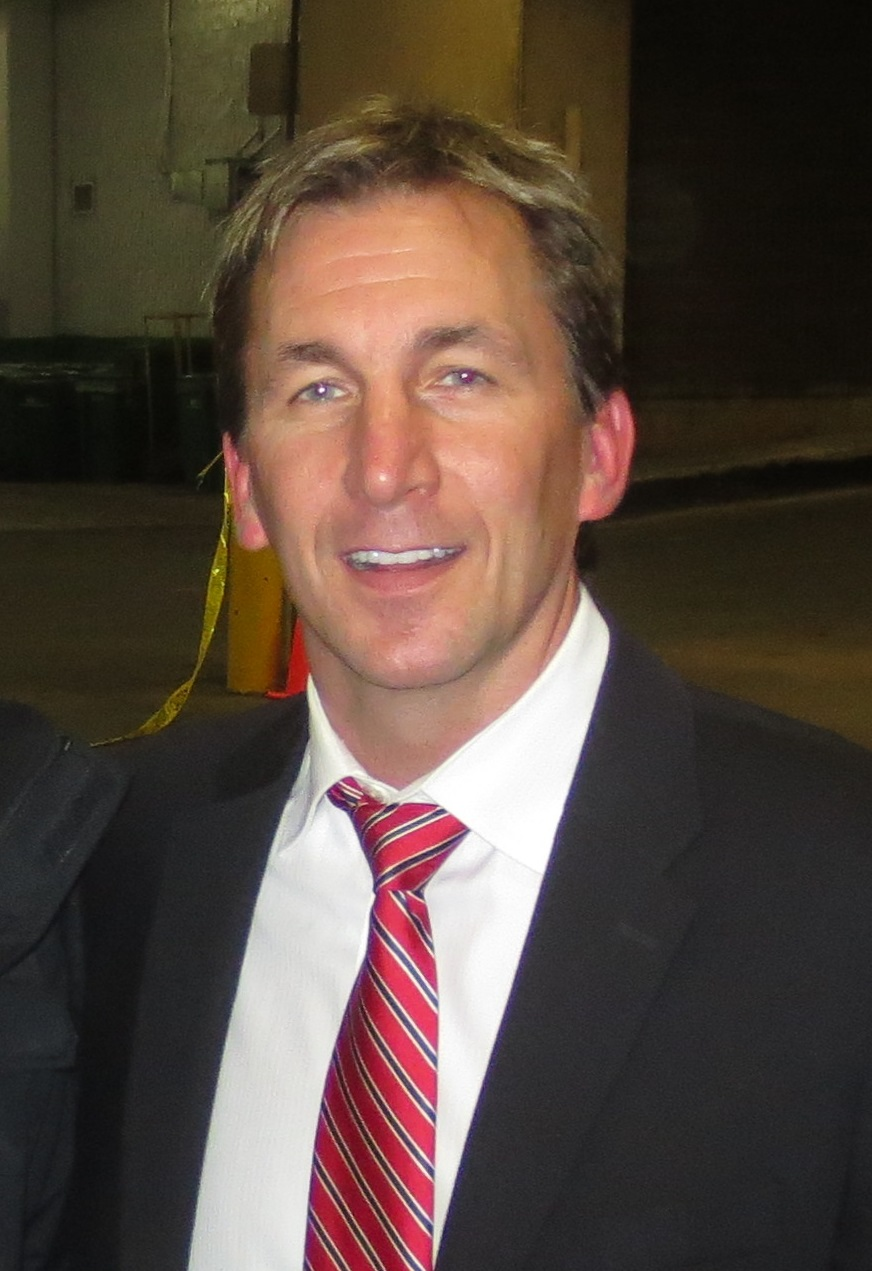
- Portrait of Stéphan Lebeau
- Born: February 28, 1968 (age 58) Saint-Jérôme, Quebec, Canada
- Height: 5 ft 10 in (178 cm)
- Weight: 172 lb (78 kg; 12 st 4 lb)
- Position: Centre
- Shot: Right
- Played for: Montreal Canadiens; Mighty Ducks of Anaheim
- NHL draft: Undrafted
- Playing career: 1988–2001

Stéphan Armand Lebeau (born February 28, 1968) is a Canadian former professional ice hockey centre who played seven seasons in the National Hockey League (NHL) from 1988–89 to 1994–95. He won a Stanley Cup in 1993 with the Montreal Canadiens. His brother, Patrick, also played a short time in the NHL.

== Playing career ==
Lebeau was a scoring sensation in junior with the Shawinigan Cataractes of the Quebec Major Junior Hockey League, and in 1987–88 he led the QMJHL in goals scored with 94. He finished his junior career second all-time in QMJHL career goals with 281, behind Mike Bossy, and second all-time in career points with 580, behind only Shawinigan-teammate Patrice Lefebvre.

Lebeau continued his scoring prowess in the American Hockey League after being signed by the Montreal Canadiens in 1986. He played one season in the AHL with the Sherbrooke Canadiens and led the league with 70 goals and 134 points as a rookie, which garnered him three major awards, including the Dudley "Red" Garrett Memorial Award as the league's top rookie. Lebeau's 70 goals still stands as the AHL single season record. The next season, he moved up to the NHL full-time, and scored 15 goals and 35 points in his rookie season. Over the next three seasons Lebeau's point total steadily improved, climaxing with 80 points in the 1992–93 season, the same year the Canadiens came away with the Stanley Cup.

However the next season he failed to produce at the same clip, and midway through was traded to the Mighty Ducks of Anaheim for goalie Ron Tugnutt. He would play in Anaheim until 1994–95, and then he moved on to play in Switzerland before retiring in 2001. He currently resides in Sherbrooke, Quebec and runs the hockey program at Bishop's College School in Lennoxville.

== Awards ==
- QMJHL Second All-Star Team (1987, 1988)
- AHL First All-Star Team (1989)
- Dudley "Red Garrett Memorial Award (1989)
- John B. Sollenberger Trophy (Leading Scorer in the AHL) (1989)
- Les Cunningham Award (AHL MVP) (1989)

== Career statistics ==
			Regular season					Playoffs
Season	Team	League	GP	G	A	Pts	PIM	GP	G	A	Pts	PIM
1983–84	Cantons de L'Est Cantonniers	QMAAA	25	15	35	50	8	—	—	—	—	—
1984–85	Shawinigan Cataractes	QMJHL	66	41	38	79	20	9	4	5	9	4
1984–85	Shawinigan Cataractes	MC	—	—	—	—	—	2	0	0	0	2
1985–86	Shawinigan Cataractes	QMJHL	72	69	77	146	22	5	4	2	6	4
1986–87	Shawinigan Cataractes	QMJHL	65	77	90	167	60	14	9	20	29	20
1987–88	Shawinigan Cataractes	QMJHL	67	94	94	188	66	11	17	9	26	10
1987–88	Sherbrooke Canadiens	AHL	—	—	—	—	—	1	0	1	1	0
1988–89	Sherbrooke Canadiens	AHL	78	70	64	134	47	6	1	4	5	8
1988–89	Montreal Canadiens	NHL	1	0	1	1	2	—	—	—	—	—
1989–90	Montreal Canadiens	NHL	57	15	20	35	11	2	3	0	3	0
1990–91	Montreal Canadiens	NHL	73	22	31	53	24	7	2	1	3	2
1991–92	Montreal Canadiens	NHL	77	27	31	58	14	8	1	3	4	4
1992–93	Montreal Canadiens	NHL	71	31	49	80	20	13	3	3	6	6
1993–94	Montreal Canadiens	NHL	34	9	7	16	8	—	—	—	—	—
1993–94	Mighty Ducks of Anaheim	NHL	22	6	4	10	14	—	—	—	—	—
1994–95	Mighty Ducks of Anaheim	NHL	38	8	16	24	12	—	—	—	—	—
1995–96	HC Lugano	NDA	36	25	28	53	12	4	2	2	4	0
1996–97	HC Lugano	NDA	18	14	12	26	12	—	—	—	—	—
1997–98	HC La Chaux–de–Fonds	NDA	40	31	39	70	14	—	—	—	—	—
1998–99	HC La Chaux–de–Fonds	SUI.2	40	32	47	79	24	12	9	11	20	4
1999–2000	HC Ambrì–Piotta	NLA	45	20	47	67	24	9	0	7	7	6
2000–01	HC Ambrì–Piotta	NLA	43	12	22	34	36	—	—	—	—	—
NHL totals			373	118	159	277	105	30	9	7	16	12
NLA/NDA totals			182	102	148	250	98	13	2	9	11	6
