= Patrick Emond =

Canadian ice hockey player and coach

- Born: January 31, 1965 (age 61) Quebec City, Quebec, Canada
- Height: 6 ft 0 in (183 cm)
- Weight: 185 lb (84 kg; 13 st 3 lb)
- Position: Centre
- Shot: Left
- Played for: Ours de Villard-de-Lans; Genève-Servette HC; Saint-Georges Garaga; Quebec Aces
- NHL draft: 103rd overall, 1983; Pittsburgh Penguins
- Playing career: 1986–1987, 1995–2003

Patrick Emond is a Canadian ice hockey coach and former player. Although he ended his junior ice hockey eligibility as the Quebec Major Junior Hockey League (QMJHL) all-time assists record holder, he never played in the National Hockey League (NHL). His assists record has only been exceeded by Patrice Lefebvre. After retiring as a player he mostly served as the head coach for Genève-Servette HC of the Swiss National League (NL) and its junior affiliate.

Emond began his junior career with the Trois-Rivières Draveurs during the 1981–82 season. During the following season he was traded to the Hull Olympiques. After the season ended he was drafted by the Pittsburgh Penguins in the 1983 NHL entry draft, and was invited to the Penguins training camp but was cut from the team. Penguins general manager Eddie Johnston said that he was cut because he did not like playing in "heavy traffic" but Edmond felt that "the fact I was the only francophone didn't help. It affected me mentally. I felt intimidated. It reflected in my play." Back in the QMJHL, he was traded to the Chicoutimi Saguenéens during the 1983–84 season and remained with them through the remainder of his junior career, through 1985–86. He finished his QMJHL career with 346 assists, a record that was exceeded in 1987 by Lefebvre. As of 2020, he also ranked third all-time in QMJHL points.

With no NHL teams interested, Edmond played for the Université du Québec à Trois-Rivières from 1988 to 1991. He later finished his playing career in the Quebec Semi-Pro Hockey League.

After his playing career ended he became a coach in the Swiss National League (NL), primarily in the Genève-Servette HC organization.
