= Jean Rougeau Trophy =

The Jean Rougeau Trophy (French: Trophée Jean Rougeau) is awarded annually to the Quebec Maritimes Junior Hockey League team that records the most points in the regular season. The trophy was named for former league president Jean Rougeau.

== Winners ==
Season	Team (totals)	Points	Win/Loss record
1969–70	Quebec Remparts (1)	75	37–18–1
1970–71	Quebec Remparts (2)	109	54–7–1
1971–72	Cornwall Royals (1)	96	47–13–2
1972–73	Quebec Remparts (3)	102	49–11–4
1973–74	Sorel Éperviers (1)	117	58–11–1
1974–75	Sherbrooke Castors (1)	109	51–14–7
1975–76	Sherbrooke Castors (2)	111	51–12–9
1976–77	Quebec Remparts (4)	92	41–21–10
1977–78	Trois-Rivières Draveurs (1)	101	47–18–7
1978–79	Trois-Rivières Draveurs (2)	122	58–8–6
1979–80	Sherbrooke Castors (3)	97	45–20–7
1980–81	Cornwall Royals (2)	90	44–26–2
1981–82	Sherbrooke Castors (4)	86	42–20–2
1982–83	Laval Voisins (1)	106	53–17–0
1983–84	Laval Voisins (2)	108	54–16–0
1984–85	Shawinigan Cataractes (1)	98	48–18–1–1
1985–86	Hull Olympiques (1)	108	54–18–0
1986–87	Granby Bisons (1)	100	48–18–4
1987–88	Hull Olympiques (2)	90	43–23–4
1988–89	Trois-Rivières Draveurs (3)	88	43–25–2
1989–90	Victoriaville Tigres (1)	89	42–23–5
1990–91	Chicoutimi Saguenéens (1)	92	43–21–6
1991–92	Verdun Collège Français (1)	101	48–17–5
1992–93	Sherbrooke Faucons (5)	94	44–20–6
1993–94	Laval Titan (3)	99	49–22–1
1994–95	Laval Titan Collège Français (4)	98	48–22–2
1995–96	Granby Prédateurs (2)	114	56–12–2
1996–97	Hull Olympiques (3)	99	48–19–3
1997–98	Quebec Remparts (5)	98	46–18–6
1998–99	Quebec Remparts (6)	108	51–13–6
1999–2000	Rimouski Océanic (1)	102	48–18–4–2
2000–01	Shawinigan Cataractes (2)	116	54–10–6–2
2001–02	Acadie–Bathurst Titan (1)	99	45–18–4–5
2002–03	Baie-Comeau Drakkar (1)	108	50–14–6–2
2003–04	Gatineau Olympiques (4)	107	50–13–7–0
2004–05	Rimouski Océanic (2)	98	45–17–5–3
2005–06	Moncton Wildcats (1)	107	52–15–0–3
2006–07	Lewiston Maineiacs (1)	106	50–14–2–4
2007–08	Rouyn-Noranda Huskies (1)	97	47–20–2–1
2008–09	Drummondville Voltigeurs (1)	112	54–10–0–4
2009–10	Saint John Sea Dogs (1)	109	53–12–1–2
2010–11	Saint John Sea Dogs (2)	119	58–7–1–2
2011–12	Saint John Sea Dogs (3)	103	50–15–0–3
2012–13	Halifax Mooseheads (1)	120	58–6–3–1
2013–14	Baie-Comeau Drakkar (2)	99	47–16–2–3
2014–15	Rimouski Océanic (3)	99	47–16–3–2
2015–16	Rouyn-Noranda Huskies (2)	113	54–9–3–2
2016–17	Saint John Sea Dogs (4)	102	48–14–5–1
2017–18	Blainville-Boisbriand Armada (1)	107	50–11–4–3
2018–19	Rouyn-Noranda Huskies (3)	119	59–8–0–1
2019–20	Sherbrooke Phoenix (6)	106	51–8–3–1
2020–21	Charlottetown Islanders (1)	70	35–5–0–0
2021–22	Quebec Remparts (7)	104	51–15–2–0
2022–23	Quebec Remparts (8)	109	53–12–1–2
2023–24	Baie-Comeau Drakkar (3)	109	53–12–2–1
2024–25	Moncton Wildcats (2)	108	53–9–2–0
2025–26	Moncton Wildcats (3)	104	50–10–2–2

== See also ==
- Hamilton Spectator Trophy - OHL
- Scotty Munro Memorial Trophy - WHL
