= Éric Desjardins =

Canadian ice hockey player (born 1969)

- Born: June 14, 1969 (age 56) Rouyn, Quebec, Canada
- Height: 6 ft 1 in (185 cm)
- Weight: 205 lb (93 kg; 14 st 9 lb)
- Position: Defence
- Shot: Right
- Played for: Montreal Canadiens; Philadelphia Flyers
- National team: Canada
- NHL draft: 38th overall, 1987; Montreal Canadiens
- Playing career: 1988–2006

Jean Noël Éric Desjardins (born June 14, 1969) is a Canadian former professional ice hockey defenceman who played 17 seasons in the National Hockey League (NHL) for the Montreal Canadiens and Philadelphia Flyers. He won the Stanley Cup with Montreal in 1993 and headlined the Flyers defence for over a decade.

== Playing career ==
Desjardins was drafted 38th overall in the 1987 NHL entry draft by the Montreal Canadiens from the Granby Bisons of the Quebec Major Junior Hockey League (QMJHL). After playing one more season for Granby, he joined the Sherbrooke Canadiens of the American Hockey League (AHL) in time to make his professional debut in the spring of 1988, playing three regular season games and four playoff games. He began his NHL career in 1988–89 with two goals and twelve assists in 36 games. He also played in 14 playoff games on Montreal's way to the 1989 Stanley Cup Final, a loss against the Calgary Flames.

His play improved thereafter, leading to an appearance in the 1992 NHL All-Star Game. By 1992–93 he had established himself as one of the team's premier defencemen, often playing in power play situations with Mathieu Schneider. Perhaps his most famous performance happened in game two of the 1993 Stanley Cup Final on June 3, 1993, when he scored all of Montreal's goals in a 3–2 overtime win over the Los Angeles Kings in a game also marked by Marty McSorley's illegal stick penalty. The game turned the series in Montreal's favour, which they would go on to win in five games to claim the Stanley Cup.

On February 9, 1995, Desjardins was traded to the Philadelphia Flyers along with John LeClair and Gilbert Dionne in exchange for Mark Recchi and a third-round pick in the 1995 NHL entry draft (Martin Hohenberger). He was brought in to solidify the Flyers defence and that he did as he won the first of what would be seven Barry Ashbee Trophies, an award given annually to the Flyers top blueliner. He played the remainder of his career with the Flyers, achieving two NHL second team All-Star selections (1999, 2000) and two more All-Star Game appearances (1996, 2000). His 396 points with the Flyers ranks second among defencemen only to Mark Howe's 480 in team history. During the 1999–2000 season, Desjardins became the Flyers captain once Eric Lindros was stripped from captainship for his complaints about the Flyers' medical staff.

The Flyers didn't offer Desjardins a contract following the 2005–06 season. His original team, Montreal, was interested in signing him for the 2006–07 season, but Desjardins opted to retire as a Flyer on August 10, 2006. Desjardins was nicknamed Rico throughout his playing career.

On January 11, 2007, before the Flyers/Canadiens game in Philadelphia, the Flyers honoured Desjardins with Eric Desjardins Night, which featured a ceremony highlighting Desjardins' Flyers career. Afterwards, Desjardins was presented gifts and tokens of appreciation from both the Flyers and the Canadiens, his two former clubs.

On February 19, 2015, before the Flyers/Sabres game in Philadelphia, the Flyers inducted Desjardins into the Flyers Hall of Fame. His former defense partner Chris Therien honored him with a speech.

== Records ==
- June 3, 1993: First and to date only defenceman to score a hat-trick in a Stanley Cup Final game.

== Career statistics ==
=== Regular season and playoffs ===
			Regular season					Playoffs
Season	Team	League	GP	G	A	Pts	PIM	GP	G	A	Pts	PIM
1985–86	Laval Laurentides	QMAAA	42	6	30	36	54	8	2	10	12	14
1986–87	Granby Bisons	QMJHL	66	14	24	38	75	8	3	2	5	10
1987–88	Granby Bisons	QMJHL	62	18	49	67	138	5	0	3	3	10
1987–88	Sherbrooke Canadiens	AHL	3	0	0	0	6	4	0	2	2	2
1988–89	Montreal Canadiens	NHL	36	2	12	14	26	14	1	1	2	6
1989–90	Montreal Canadiens	NHL	55	3	13	16	51	6	0	0	0	10
1990–91	Montreal Canadiens	NHL	62	7	18	25	27	13	1	4	5	8
1991–92	Montreal Canadiens	NHL	77	6	32	38	50	11	3	3	6	4
1992–93	Montreal Canadiens	NHL	82	13	32	45	98	20	4	10	14	23
1993–94	Montreal Canadiens	NHL	84	12	23	35	97	7	0	2	2	4
1994–95	Montreal Canadiens	NHL	9	0	6	6	2	—	—	—	—	—
1994–95	Philadelphia Flyers	NHL	34	5	18	23	12	15	4	4	8	10
1995–96	Philadelphia Flyers	NHL	80	7	40	47	45	12	0	6	6	2
1996–97	Philadelphia Flyers	NHL	82	12	34	46	50	19	2	8	10	12
1997–98	Philadelphia Flyers	NHL	77	6	27	33	36	5	0	1	1	0
1998–99	Philadelphia Flyers	NHL	68	15	36	51	38	6	2	2	4	4
1999–00	Philadelphia Flyers	NHL	81	14	41	55	32	18	2	10	12	2
2000–01	Philadelphia Flyers	NHL	79	15	33	48	50	6	1	1	2	0
2001–02	Philadelphia Flyers	NHL	65	6	19	25	24	5	0	1	1	2
2002–03	Philadelphia Flyers	NHL	79	8	24	32	35	5	2	1	3	0
2003–04	Philadelphia Flyers	NHL	48	1	11	12	28	—	—	—	—	—
2005–06	Philadelphia Flyers	NHL	45	4	20	24	56	6	1	3	4	6
NHL totals			1,143	136	439	575	757	168	23	57	80	93

=== International ===
Year	Team	Event	GP	G	A	Pts	PIM
1988	Canada	WJC	7	0	0	0	6
1989	Canada	WJC	7	1	4	5	6
1991	Canada	CC	8	1	2	3	6
1996	Canada	WCH	8	1	2	3	4
1998	Canada	OG	6	0	0	0	2
Junior totals			14	1	4	5	12
Senior totals			22	2	4	6	12

=== All-Star Games ===
Year	Location	G	A	P
1992	Philadelphia	0	1	1
1996	Boston	0	0	0
2000	Toronto	0	1	1
All-Star totals		0	2	2

== Awards ==
Award	Year(s)
Barry Ashbee Trophy	1995, 1996, 1997, 1998, 1999, 2000, 2003
Emile Bouchard Trophy	1988
NHL second team All-Star	1999, 2000
QMJHL First Team All-Star	1988
QMJHL Second Team All-Star	1987
Yanick Dupre Memorial Class Guy Award	1999
Stanley Cup Champion	1993

== See also ==
- List of NHL players with 1,000 games played

Preceded by Eric Lindros	Philadelphia Flyers captain 2000–01	Succeeded by Keith Primeau
