= 1986–87 QMJHL season =

Canadian junior ice hockey season

The 1986–87 QMJHL season was the 18th season in the history of the Quebec Major Junior Hockey League. Ten teams played 70 games each in the schedule. The two last place teams from previous season both won their divisions. The Granby Bisons finished first overall in the regular season, winning their first Jean Rougeau Trophy since relocating from Sorel, Quebec. The Longueuil Chevaliers won their first President's Cup, defeating the Chicoutimi Saguenéens in the finals.

== Final standings ==
Note: GP = Games played; W = Wins; L = Losses; T = Ties; Pts = Points; GF = Goals for; GA = Goals against

Dilio Division	GP	W	L	T	Pts	GF	GA
Granby Bisons	70	48	18	4	100	416	318
Shawinigan Cataractes	70	38	26	6	82	408	335
Chicoutimi Saguenéens	70	37	28	5	79	411	353
Drummondville Voltigeurs	70	35	35	0	70	353	382
Trois-Rivières Draveurs	70	28	40	2	58	357	389

Lebel Division	GP	W	L	T	Pts	GF	GA
Longueuil Chevaliers	70	46	20	4	96	369	259
Laval Titan	70	34	32	4	72	377	340
Saint-Jean Castors	70	28	41	1	57	332	389
Hull Olympiques	70	26	39	5	57	286	323
Verdun Junior Canadiens	70	14	55	1	29	299	520

- complete list of standings.

== Scoring leaders ==
Note: GP = Games played; G = Goals; A = Assists; Pts = Points; PIM = Penalties in Minutes

Player	Team	GP	G	A	Pts	PIM
Marc Fortier	Chicoutimi Saguenéens	65	66	135	201	39
Patrice Lefebvre	Shawinigan Cataractes	69	57	122	179	144
Stephan Lebeau	Shawinigan Cataractes	65	77	90	167	60
Patrice Tremblay	Chicoutimi Saguenéens	70	76	80	156	34
Pierre Turgeon	Granby Bisons	58	69	85	154	8
Luc Beausoleil	Laval Titan	67	65	87	152	53
Claude Dumas	Granby Bisons	67	50	82	132	59
Francois Guay	Laval Titan	63	52	77	129	67
Alain Charland	Drummondville Voltigeurs	70	53	75	128	64
Stefan Figliuzzi	Saint-Jean Castors	70	43	78	121	25

- complete scoring statistics

== Playoffs ==
Marc Fortier was the leading scorer of the playoffs with 44 points (17 goals, 27 assists).

Division semifinal round-robin standings

Note: GP = Games played; W = Wins; L = Losses; PTS = Points; GF = Goals For; GA = Goals Against

Dilio Division	GP	W	L	Pts	GF	GA
Shawinigan Cataractes	8	7	1	14	40	37
Chicoutimi Saguenéens	8	4	4	8	47	39
Granby Bisons	8	3	5	6	39	44
Drummondville Voltigeurs	8	2	6	4	34	40
Lebel Division	GP	W	L	Pts	GF	GA
Longueuil Chevaliers	8	5	3	10	35	34
Laval Titan	8	5	3	10	50	39
Hull Olympiques	8	4	4	8	38	34
Saint-Jean Castors	8	2	6	4	35	51

Division finals

- Longueuil Chevaliers defeated Laval Titan 4 games to 3.
- Chicoutimi Saguenéens defeated Shawinigan Cataractes 4 games to 2.

Finals

- Longueuil Chevaliers defeated Chicoutimi Saguenéens 4 games to 1.

== All-star teams ==
First team

- Goaltender - Robert Desjardins, Longueuil Chevaliers
- Left defence - Jean-Marc Richard, Chicoutimi Saguenéens
- Right defence - Stephane Quintal, Granby Bisons
- Left winger - Everett Sanipass, Granby Bisons
- Centreman - Marc Fortier, Chicoutimi Saguenéens
- Right winger - Patrice Lefebvre, Shawinigan Cataractes
- Coach - Guy Chouinard, Longueuil Chevaliers

Second team

- Goaltender - Jimmy Waite, Chicoutimi Saguenéens
- Left defence - Donald Dufresne, Longueuil Chevaliers
- Right defence - Eric Desjardins, Granby Bisons
- Left winger - Benoit Brunet, Hull Olympiques
- Centreman - Stephan Lebeau, Shawinigan Cataractes
- Right winger - Luc Beausoleil, Laval Titan & Patrice Tremblay, Chicoutimi Saguenéens
- Coach - Gaston Drapeau, Chicoutimi Saguenéens
- List of First/Second/Rookie team all-stars.

== Trophies and awards ==
Team

- President's Cup - Playoff Champions, Longueuil Chevaliers
- Jean Rougeau Trophy - Regular Season Champions, Granby Bisons
- Robert Lebel Trophy - Team with best GAA, Longueuil Chevaliers

Player

- Michel Brière Memorial Trophy - Most Valuable Player, Robert Desjardins, Longueuil Chevaliers
- Jean Béliveau Trophy - Top Scorer, Marc Fortier, Chicoutimi Saguenéens
- Guy Lafleur Trophy - Playoff MVP, Marc Saumier, Longueuil Chevaliers
- Jacques Plante Memorial Trophy - Best GAA, Robert Desjardins, Longueuil Chevaliers
- Emile Bouchard Trophy - Defenceman of the Year, Jean-Marc Richard, Chicoutimi Saguenéens
- Mike Bossy Trophy - Best Pro Prospect, Pierre Turgeon, Granby Bisons
- Michel Bergeron Trophy - Offensive Rookie of the Year, Rob Murphy, Laval Voisins
- Raymond Lagacé Trophy - Defensive Rookie of the Year, Jimmy Waite, Chicoutimi Saguenéens
- Frank J. Selke Memorial Trophy - Most sportsmanlike player, Luc Beausoleil, Laval Voisins
- Marcel Robert Trophy - Best Scholastic Player, Patrice Tremblay, Chicoutimi Saguenéens

== See also ==
- 1987 Memorial Cup
- 1987 NHL entry draft
- 1986–87 OHL season
- 1986–87 WHL season

Preceded by 1985–86 QMJHL season	QMJHL seasons	Succeeded by 1987–88 QMJHL season
