= Marc Saumier =

Canadian ice hockey player (born 1967)

- Born: April 18, 1967 (age 58) Hull, Quebec, Canada
- Height: 5 ft 10 in (178 cm)
- Weight: 194 lb (88 kg; 13 st 12 lb)
- Position: Centre
- Shot: Right
- Played for: AHL; Sherbrooke Canadiens; Halifax Citadels; IHL; Flint Spirits; Peoria Rivermen; Fort Wayne Komets; Phoenix Roadrunners; CoHL; Muskegon Fury; QSPHL; Lachute Rapides; LaSalle Rapides
- NHL draft: Undrafted
- Playing career: 1988–2001

Marc Saumier (born April 18, 1967) is a Canadian former ice hockey player. He won the Michel Brière Memorial Trophy as the Most Valuable Player in the Quebec Major Junior Hockey League for his outstanding play with the Hull Olympiques during the 1987–88 QMJHL season.

== Career statistics ==
			Regular season					Playoffs
Season	Team	League	GP	G	A	Pts	PIM	GP	G	A	Pts	PIM
1984–85	Hull Olympiques	QMJHL	62	16	27	43	228	5	0	0	0	49
1985–86	Hull Olympiques	QMJHL	11	5	5	10	44	—	—	—	—	—
1985–86	Longueuil Chevaliers	QMJHL	60	23	50	73	360	—	—	—	—	—
1986–87	Longueuil Chevaliers	QMJHL	50	39	49	88	250	20	15	26	41	48
1986–87	Longueuil Chevaliers	MC	—	—	—	—	—	5	0	1	1	45
1987–88	Hull Olympiques	QMJHL	59	52	114	166	177	19	17	31	48	15
1987–88	Hull Olympiques	MC	—	—	—	—	—	4	2	4	6	10
1987–88	Sherbrooke Canadiens	AHL	4	1	0	1	6	—	—	—	—	—
1988–89	Flint Spirits	IHL	17	2	5	7	62	—	—	—	—	—
1988–89	Peoria Rivermen	IHL	41	12	12	24	204	4	2	1	3	22
1989–90	Sherbrooke Canadiens	AHL	5	0	0	0	7	—	—	—	—	—
1989–90	Peoria Rivermen	IHL	17	5	10	15	143	2	0	0	0	9
1990–91	Fort Wayne Komets	IHL	20	6	2	8	67	—	—	—	—	—
1990–91	Phoenix Roadrunners	IHL	58	24	37	61	187	1	0	0	0	0
1991–92	Phoenix Roadrunners	IHL	70	19	23	42	310	—	—	—	—	—
1992–93	Phoenix Roadrunners	IHL	6	3	3	6	17	—	—	—	—	—
1992–93	Halifax Citadels	AHL	5	0	0	0	4	—	—	—	—	—
1992–93	Muskegon Fury	CoHL	41	26	53	79	123	7	4	7	11	21
1994–95	Muskegon Fury	CoHL	69	33	77	110	219	17	5	6	11	71
1997–98	Lachute Rapides	QSPHL	27	16	34	50	69	—	—	—	—	—
1998–99	Lachute Rapides	QSPHL	20	10	19	29	63	—	—	—	—	—
1999–2000	LaSalle Rapides	QSPHL	28	10	21	31	74	20	7	12	19	24
2000–01	LaSalle Rapides	QSPHL	5	2	2	4	9	—	—	—	—	—
IHL totals			229	71	92	163	990	7	2	1	3	31
QSPHL totals			80	38	76	114	215	20	7	12	19	24
