= Patrice Lefebvre =

Canadian-born Italian former ice hockey player

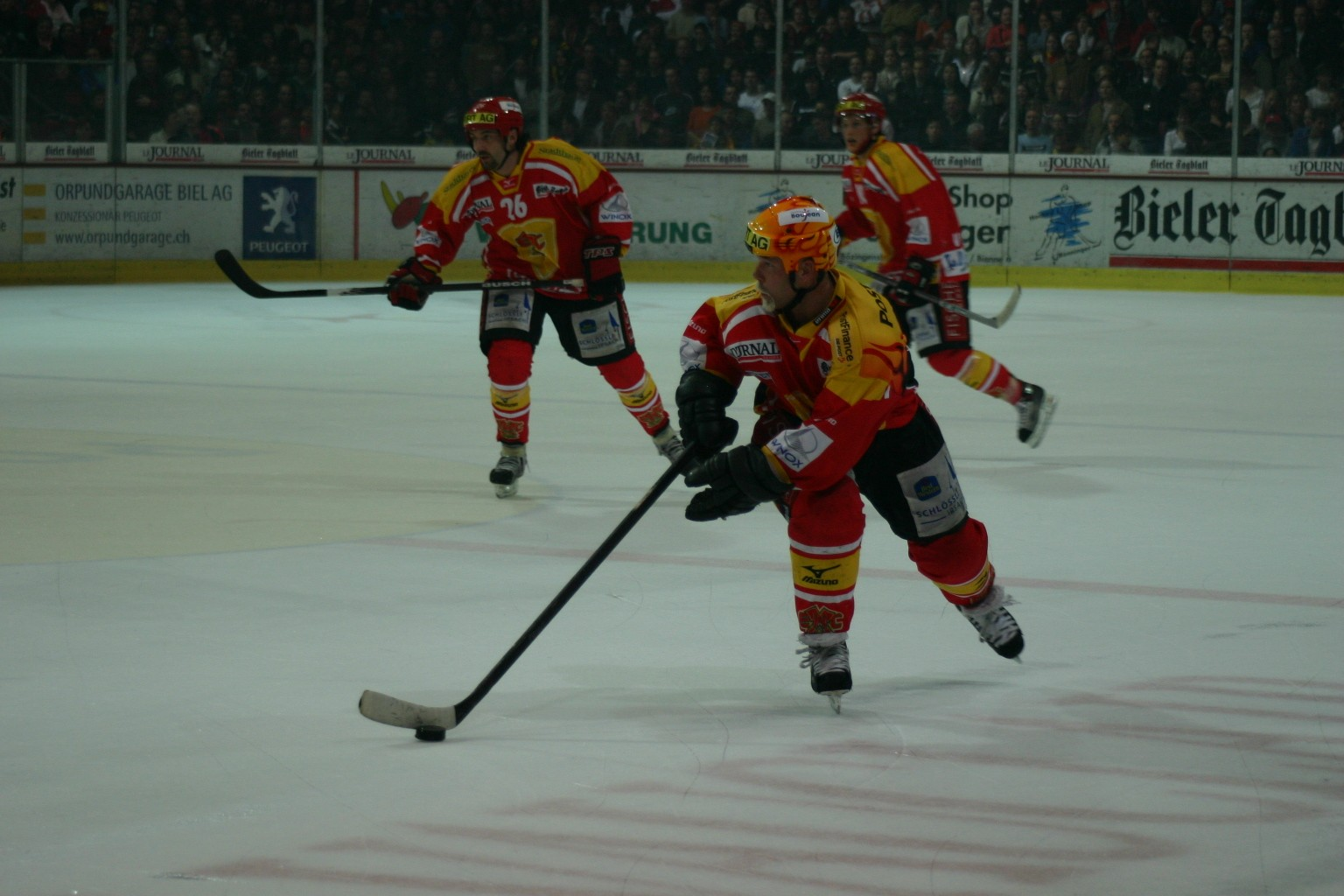
- Born: June 28, 1967 (age 58) Montreal, Quebec, Canada
- Height: 5 ft 6 in (168 cm)
- Weight: 160 lb (73 kg; 11 st 6 lb)
- Position: Right wing
- Shot: Left
- Played for: Washington Capitals
- National team: Italy
- NHL draft: Undrafted
- Playing career: 1988–2009

Patrice Lefebvre (born June 28, 1967) is a Canadian-born Italian former ice hockey player. Lefebvre played three games in the National Hockey League for the Washington Capitals during the 1998–99 NHL season.

== Biography ==
Lefebvre was born in Montreal, Quebec. As a youth, he played in the 1979 Quebec International Pee-Wee Hockey Tournament with a minor ice hockey team from Ville-Émard.

Despite putting up impressive numbers with the Shawinigan Cataractes in the QMJHL he was never drafted by an NHL-team, possibly due to his small stature (Lefebvre is listed as 5 ft 6 in (1,68 m) and 160 lb (73 kg)).

Later in his career Lefebvre has played in DEL, Serie A, Oddset Ligaen and Nationalliga B. At the beginning of his career he also played in France and Nationalliga A.

In 2006 Lefebvre became an Italian citizen (he is married to an Italian woman) and played 2007 World Championship with the Azzurri.

== Titles ==
- Most Valuable Player (IHL 97/98){James Gatschene Memorial Trophy, www.hockeydb.com}
- Top Scorer (IHL 97/98){Leo P. Lamoureux Memorial Trophy, www.hockeydb.com}
- All Time Best Scorer (QMJHL)
- All Time Most Assists(QMJHL)
- Most assists NLB 2006–07

== Career statistics ==
=== Regular season and playoffs ===
			Regular season					Playoffs
Season	Team	League	GP	G	A	Pts	PIM	GP	G	A	Pts	PIM
1982–83	Montréal-Concordia	QMAAA	41	26	37	63	103	—	—	—	—	—
1983–84	Montréal-Concordia	QMAAA	42	36	45	81	52	14	10	16	26	16
1984–85	Shawinigan Cataractes	QMJHL	68	28	52	80	63	8	3	7	10	27
1984–85	Shawinigan Cataractes	MC	—	—	—	—	—	4	2	1	3	2
1985–86	Shawinigan Cataractes	QMJHL	69	38	98	136	146	5	2	5	7	14
1986–87	Shawinigan Cataractes	QMJHL	69	57	122	179	144	12	9	16	25	19
1987–88	Shawinigan Cataractes	QMJHL	70	64	136	200	142	11	5	23	28	4
1988–89	Français Volants	FRA	40	40	50	90	—	—	—	—	—	—
1989–90	HC Ajoie	NDA	32	21	22	43	36	—	—	—	—	—
1990–91	SC Langnau	CHE II	3	0	4	4	2	—	—	—	—	—
1990–91	Louisville Icehawks	ECHL	26	17	26	43	32	7	2	5	7	8
1990–91	Milwaukee Admirals	IHL	16	6	4	10	13	—	—	—	—	—
1990–91	Springfield Indians	AHL	1	0	0	0	2	—	—	—	—	—
1991–92	EHC Kloten	NDA	10	4	8	12	12	—	—	—	—	—
1991–92	HC Sierre	CHE II	4	2	2	4	10	—	—	—	—	—
1992–93	Billingham Bombers	GBR	36	59	106	165	75	6	5	13	18	26
1993–94	Las Vegas Thunder	IHL	76	31	67	98	71	5	3	4	7	4
1994–95	Las Vegas Thunder	IHL	74	32	62	94	74	10	2	3	5	2
1995–96	Las Vegas Thunder	IHL	77	36	78	114	85	15	9	11	20	12
1996–97	Las Vegas Thunder	IHL	82	21	73	94	94	3	0	2	2	2
1997–98	Las Vegas Thunder	IHL	77	27	89	116	113	4	2	0	2	2
1998–99	Las Vegas Thunder	IHL	42	11	26	37	40	—	—	—	—	—
1998–99	Washington Capitals	NHL	3	0	0	0	2	—	—	—	—	—
1998–99	Long Beach Ice Dogs	IHL	14	1	12	13	8	8	0	3	3	2
1999–2000	Adler Mannheim	DEL	54	20	31	51	148	5	1	2	3	4
2000–01	Frankfurt Lions	DEL	57	24	39	63	63	—	—	—	—	—
2001–02	Milano Vipers	ITA	33	13	34	47	50	10	7	12	19	6
2002–03	Milano Vipers	ITA	37	19	54	73	26	9	4	9	13	4
2003–04	Milano Vipers	ITA	24	11	30	41	26	12	3	8	11	8
2004–05	Rødovre Mighty Bulls	DNK	29	6	32	38	116	3	0	3	3	0
2005–06	EHC Biel-Bienne	CHE II	42	18	56	74	54	17	5	31	36	20
2006–07	Lausanne HC	CHE II	45	19	79	98	50	11	3	7	10	39
2007–08	SG Pontebba	ITA	19	4	12	16	30	—	—	—	—	—
2007–08	Devils Milano	ITA	12	2	14	16	4	9	1	6	7	4
2008–09	HC Valpellice	ITA II	37	17	54	71	90	—	—	—	—	—
2009–10	Real Torino HC	ITA II	1	0	1	1	0	1	0	1	1	0
IHL totals			458	165	411	576	498	45	16	23	39	24
NHL totals			3	0	0	0	2	—	—	—	—	—
ITA totals			125	49	144	193	136	40	15	35	50	22

=== International ===
Year	Team	Event	GP	G	A	Pts	PIM
2007	Italy	WC	5	0	0	0	2
