= 1987–88 QMJHL season =

Canadian junior ice hockey season

The 1987–88 QMJHL season was the 19th season in the history of the Quebec Major Junior Hockey League. Ten teams played 70 games each in the schedule. Patrice Lefebvre of the Shawinigan Cataractes becomes the last player in Canadian Hockey League history to record a 200-point season. The Hull Olympiques finished first overall in the regular season, winning their second Jean Rougeau Trophy, and won their second President's Cup, defeating the Drummondville Voltigeurs in the finals.

== Team changes ==
- The Longueuil Chevaliers relocate to Victoriaville, Quebec, becoming the Victoriaville Tigres, switching to the Dilio Division.
- The Granby Bisons switch to the Lebel Division.

== Final standings ==
Note: GP = Games played; W = Wins; L = Losses; T = Ties; Pts = Points; GF = Goals for; GA = Goals against

Dilio Division	GP	W	L	T	Pts	GF	GA
Chicoutimi Saguenéens	70	38	31	1	77	352	318
Drummondville Voltigeurs	70	35	31	4	74	341	327
Victoriaville Tigres	70	33	31	6	72	298	293
Shawinigan Cataractes	70	30	37	3	63	387	381
Trois-Rivières Draveurs	70	27	37	6	60	338	366

Lebel Division	GP	W	L	T	Pts	GF	GA
Hull Olympiques	70	43	23	4	90	380	394
Laval Titan	70	43	25	2	88	385	346
Saint-Jean Castors	70	41	26	3	85	346	283
Granby Bisons	70	23	44	3	49	294	370
Verdun Junior Canadiens	70	19	47	4	42	285	428

- complete list of standings.

== Scoring leaders ==
Note: GP = Games played; G = Goals; A = Assists; Pts = Points; PIM = Penalties in minutes

Player	Team	GP	G	A	Pts	PIM
Patrice Lefebvre	Shawinigan Cataractes	70	64	136	200	142
Stéphan Lebeau	Shawinigan Cataractes	67	94	94	188	66
Marc Saumier	Hull Olympiques	59	52	114	166	177
Patrice Tremblay	Chicoutimi Saguenéens	68	72	75	147	83
Daniel Maurice	Chicoutimi Saguenéens	69	56	90	146	150
François Guay	Laval Titan	66	60	84	144	142
Benoît Brunet	Hull Olympiques	62	54	89	143	131
Terry MacLean	Trois-Rivières Draveurs	69	52	91	143	44
Sylvain Couturier	Laval Titan	67	70	67	137	115
Martin Gélinas	Hull Olympiques	65	63	68	131	74

- complete scoring statistics

== Playoffs ==
Marc Saumier was the leading scorer of the playoffs with 48 points (17 goals, 31 assists).

Division semifinals

- Shawinigan Cataractes defeated Chicoutimi Saguenéens 4 games to 2.
- Drummondville Voltigeurs defeated Victoriaville Tigres 4 games to 1.
- Hull Olympiques defeated Granby Bisons 4 games to 1.
- Laval Titan defeated Saint-Jean Castors 4 games to 3.

Division Finals

- Drummondville Voltigeurs defeated Shawinigan Cataractes 4 games to 1.
- Hull Olympiques defeated Laval Titan 4 games to 3.

Finals

- Hull Olympiques defeated Drummondville Voltigeurs 4 games to 3.

== All-star teams ==
First team

- Goaltender – Stéphane Beauregard, Saint-Jean Castors
- Left defence – Yves Racine, Victoriaville Tigres
- Right defence – Éric Desjardins, Granby Bisons
- Left winger – Martin Gélinas, Hull Olympiques
- Centreman – Marc Saumier, Hull Olympiques
- Right winger – Patrice Lefebvre, Shawinigan Cataractes
- Coach – Alain Vigneault, Hull Olympiques

Second team

- Goaltender – Jason Glickman, Hull Olympiques
- Left defence – Éric Tremblay, Drummondville Voltigeurs
- Right defence – Steve Veilleux, Trois-Rivières Draveurs
- Left winger – Yves Gaucher, Chicoutimi Saguenéens
- Centreman – Stéphan Lebeau, Shawinigan Cataractes
- Right winger – Patrice Tremblay, Chicoutimi Saguenéens
- Coach – Guy Chouinard, Victoriaville Tigres
- List of First/Second/Rookie team all-stars.

== Trophies and awards ==
Team

- President's Cup – Playoff Champions, Hull Olympiques
- Jean Rougeau Trophy – Regular Season Champions, Hull Olympiques
- Robert Lebel Trophy – Team with best GAA, Saint-Jean Castors

Player

- Michel Brière Memorial Trophy – Most Valuable Player, Marc Saumier, Hull Olympiques
- Jean Béliveau Trophy – Top Scorer, Patrice Lefebvre, Shawinigan Cataractes
- Guy Lafleur Trophy – Playoff MVP, Marc Saumier, Hull Olympiques
- Jacques Plante Memorial Trophy – Best GAA, Stéphane Beauregard, Saint-Jean Castors
- Emile Bouchard Trophy – Defenceman of the Year, Éric Desjardins, Granby Bisons
- Mike Bossy Trophy – Best Pro Prospect, Daniel Doré, Drummondville Voltigeurs
- Michel Bergeron Trophy – Offensive Rookie of the Year, Martin Gélinas, Hull Olympiques
- Raymond Lagacé Trophy – Defensive Rookie of the Year, Stéphane Beauregard, Saint-Jean Castors
- Frank J. Selke Memorial Trophy – Most sportsmanlike player, Stéphan Lebeau, Shawinigan Cataractes
- Marcel Robert Trophy – Best Scholastic Player, Stéphane Beauregard, Saint-Jean Castors

== See also ==
- 1988 Memorial Cup
- 1988 NHL entry draft
- 1987–88 OHL season
- 1987–88 WHL season

Preceded by 1986–87 QMJHL season	QMJHL seasons	Succeeded by 1988–89 QMJHL season
