= Laval Titan =

Ice hockey team

- City: Laval, Quebec
- League: QMJHL
- Operated: 1971; 55 years ago – 1998; 28 years ago
- Home arena: Colisée de Laval

Franchise history
- 1969–1971: Rosemont National
- 1971–1979: Laval National
- 1979–1985: Laval Voisins
- 1985–1994: Laval Titan
- 1994–1998: Laval Titan Collège Français
- 1998–2025: Acadie–Bathurst Titan
- 2025–present: Newfoundland Regiment

The Laval Titan was one of the names used by a junior ice hockey team in the Quebec Major Junior Hockey League (QMJHL) franchise that played in Laval, Quebec, Canada, between 1971 and 1998.

== History ==
The Rosemont National began in the 1969–70 QMJHL season as one of the founding franchises of the QMJHL, playing in the Montreal borough of Rosemont, Quebec at the Paul Sauvé Arena. After only two seasons in Rosemont the team moved to Laval, Quebec, where they would play the next 27 years under several names. Laval National was the team's original name, but they were renamed the Laval Voisins (meaning neighbours) in 1979, and then the Titan ("Titans") in 1985.

During the 1983-1984 season, Laval won their first QMJHL championship. The team was coached by Jean Bégin, and featured Mario Lemieux who had scored 133 goals and 282 points in 70 games during the regular season. In game six of the championship, Laval defeated the Longueuil Chevaliers by a score of 17–1 to clinch the league title. Mario Lemieux led his team with six goals and two assists.

For the 1994–95 QMJHL season the team was renamed Laval Titan Collège Français, when the Collège Français came aboard as a sponsor, bring some of its management when the Verdun Collège Français folded in the off-season. In 1998, faced with an aging Colisée de Laval and dwindling attendance, the team moved to Bathurst, New Brunswick, becoming the Acadie–Bathurst Titan.

The Titan won the President's Cup four times, in 1984, 1989, 1990 and 1993. They participated in the Memorial Cup five times and made the final once in 1994, when they hosted the tournament. They lost that year to the Kamloops Blazers.

== NHL alumni ==
Totals include all incarnations of the Laval franchise.

- Jean-Sébastien Aubin
- Donald Audette
- François Beauchemin
- Sylvain Blouin
- Patrick Boileau
- Claude Boivin
- Paulin Bordeleau
- **Mike Bossy**
- Philippe Boucher
- Francis Bouillon
- Patrice Brisebois
- Mario Brunetta
- Fred Burchell
- Sébastien Charpentier
- Ed Courtenay
- Yves Courteau
- Sylvain Couturier
- Glen Currie
- Pierre Dagenais
- J. J. Daigneault
- Pat Daley
- Vincent Damphousse
- Jacques Deslauriers
- Jason Doig
- Bobby Dollas
- Gord Donnelly
- Gordie Dwyer
- Manny Fernandez
- Steven Finn
- Ryan Flinn
- Mike Gaul
- Jonathan Girard
- Daniel Goneau
- Benoît Gratton
- François Guay
- Gilles Hamel
- Pierre Hamel
- Jean-Marc Lanthier
- Daniel Laperrière
- Claude Lapointe
- Martin Lapointe
- Georges Laraque
- Sylvain Lefebvre
- Jocelyn Lemieux
- **Mario Lemieux**
- Dave Logan
- Don MacLean
- Jimmy Mann
- George McAvoy
- Sandy McCarthy
- Michel Mongeau
- Pete Morin
- Rob Murphy
- Anders Myrvold
- Gino Odjick
- Yves Preston
- Bob Sauvé
- Daniel Shank
- Jon Sim
- Bob Sirois
- Yvon Vautour
- Claude Vilgrain
- Colin White

Bold indicates a member of the Hockey Hall of Fame.

== Season-by-season record ==
- Rosemont National (1969–1971)
- Laval National (1971–1979)
- Laval Voisins (1979–1985)
- Laval Titan (1985–1994)
- Laval Titan Collège Français (1994–1998)

=== Regular season ===
OL = Overtime loss, Pct = Winning percentage

Season	Games	Won	Lost	Tied	OL	Points	Pct	Goals for	Goals against	Standing
1969–70	56	23	30	3	—	49	0.438	245	275	3rd, West
1970–71	62	22	39	1	—	45	0.363	263	353	9th, QMJHL
1971–72	62	9	53	0	—	18	0.145	224	430	10th, QMJHL
1972–73	64	28	35	1	—	57	0.445	301	377	6th, QMJHL
1973–74	70	30	37	3	—	63	0.450	362	425	4th, West
1974–75	72	26	39	7	—	59	0.410	335	401	5th, West
1975–76	72	25	41	6	—	56	0.389	310	358	5th, West
1976–77	72	26	35	11	—	63	0.438	325	363	3rd, Lebel
1977–78	72	35	26	11	—	81	0.562	435	362	3rd, Lebel
1978–79	72	22	43	7	—	51	0.354	316	469	4th, Lebel
1979–80	72	13	52	7	—	33	0.229	265	499	5th, Lebel
1980–81	72	21	49	2	—	44	0.306	293	396	5th, Lebel
1981–82	64	30	33	1	—	61	0.477	298	326	7th, QMJHL
1982–83	70	53	17	0	—	106	0.757	452	305	1st, Lebel
1983–84	70	54	16	0	—	108	0.771	527	289	1st, Lebel
1984–85	68	28	35	1	4	61	0.419	314	358	4th, Lebel
1985–86	72	37	34	1	—	75	0.521	406	386	3rd, Lebel
1986–87	70	34	32	4	—	72	0.514	377	340	2nd, Lebel
1987–88	70	43	25	2	—	88	0.629	385	346	2nd, Lebel
1988–89	70	43	26	1	—	87	0.621	361	292	2nd, QMJHL
1989–90	70	37	30	3	—	77	0.550	332	274	5th, QMJHL
1990–91	70	37	30	3	—	77	0.550	273	242	3rd, Lebel
1991–92	70	38	27	5	—	81	0.579	306	276	3rd, Lebel
1992–93	70	43	25	2	—	88	0.629	367	277	1st, Lebel
1993–94	72	49	22	1	—	99	0.688	346	247	1st, Lebel
1994–95	72	48	22	2	—	98	0.681	302	232	1st, Lebel
1995–96	70	14	54	2	—	30	0.214	219	404	7th, Lebel
1996–97	70	27	40	3	—	57	0.407	260	314	5th, Lebel
1997–98	70	37	28	5	—	79	0.564	276	220	5th, Lebel
