= Drummondville Voltigeurs =

Junior ice hockey team in Drummondville, Quebec

Drummondville Voltigeurs Voltigeurs de Drummondville
- City: Drummondville, Quebec
- League: Quebec Maritimes Junior Hockey League
- Conference: Western
- Division: Central
- Founded: 1982
- Home arena: Centre Marcel Dionne
- Colours: Black, red, silver and white
- General manager: Yannik Lemay
- Head coach: Sylvain Favreau
- Website: www.voltigeurs.ca

Championships
- Playoff championships: QMJHL champions 2009, 2024

Current uniform

The Drummondville Voltigeurs are a Canadian junior ice hockey team of the Quebec Maritimes Junior Hockey League (QMJHL). The franchise was originally granted for the 1982–83 season, and is based in Drummondville, Quebec, playing its home games at the Centre Marcel Dionne. The team won the QMJHL's President's Cup in 2009 and 2024.

== History ==
Drummondville had a QMJHL team at the foundation of the League in 1969, called the Drummondville Rangers. However, the team folded at the end of the 1973–74 season. For the 1982–83 season, the city was granted an expansion franchise, along with the Longueuil Chevaliers. The team was named for a Quebec-based regiment that fought in the War of 1812, the Canadian Voltigeurs.

On February 9, 1989, Drummondville's coach and general manager Jean Bégin, was suspended indefinitely after he was arrested and charged with sexual assault.

The Voltigeurs have participated in the Memorial Cup tournament three times. In 1988 and 1991, they participated as the QMJHL runner-up and in 2009 as League champions. The Voltigeurs won both the President's Cup and Jean Rougeau Trophy during the 2008–09 season. In the 2009 Memorial Cup, the Voltigeurs finished second in the round robin, but lost to the Windsor Spitfires in the semi-finals.

== Championships ==
Memorial Cup

- 1988 4th place (in Chicoutimi, Quebec)
- 1991 Finalists vs. Spokane Chiefs (in Quebec City, Quebec)
- 2009 Semi-Finalists vs. Windsor Spitfires (in Rimouski, Quebec)
- 2024 4th place (in Saginaw, Michigan)

President's Cup

- 1986 Finalists vs. Hull Olympiques (lost 5-0)
- 1988 Finalists vs. Hull Olympiques (lost 4–3)
- 1991 Finalists vs. Chicoutimi Saguenéens (lost 4–0)
- 2009 Champions vs. Shawinigan Cataractes (won 4–3)
- 2024 Champions vs. Baie-Comeau Drakkar (won 4–0)

Jean Rougeau Trophy

- 2008–09 – 112 points

== Notable coaches ==
List of notable coaches:

- Jean Bégin
- Guy Boucher
- Frank Breault
- Jos Canale
- Dominique Ducharme
- Jocelyn Guevremont
- Jean Hamel
- Blair MacKasey
- Michel Parizeau
- Ron Ward

== Players ==
=== NHL alumni ===
List of alumni to play in the National Hockey League (NHL):

- Jake Allen
- Alex Barré-Boulet
- Nicolas Beaudin
- Derick Brassard
- Daniel Brière
- Michael Carcone
- William Carrier
- Max Comtois
- René Corbet
- Sean Couturier
- Chris DiDomenico
- Steve Duchesne
- William Dufour
- Gabriel Dumont
- Frédérick Gaudreau
- Denis Gauthier
- Mike Hoffman
- Raman Hrabarenka
- Pierre-Olivier Joseph
- Dmitry Kulikov
- Ian Laperrière
- Guillaume Latendresse
- Dawson Mercer
- Ondřej Palát
- Joe Veleno

=== Retired numbers ===
List of retired uniform numbers:

- 7 - Sean Couturier
- 12 – Steve Chartrand
- 14 – Daniel Brière / Ian Laperrière
- 18 – Steve Duchesne
- 21 – Denis Gauthier
- 22 – Guillaume Latendresse
- 25 – René Corbet
- 61 – Derick Brassard
