= 1985–86 QMJHL season =

Canadian junior ice hockey season

The 1985–86 QMJHL season was the 17th season in the history of the Quebec Major Junior Hockey League. The league loses one of its charter members in the offseason, when the Quebec Remparts suspend operations. The remaining ten teams played 72 games each in the schedule. Gilles Courteau became president of the QMJHL on February 13, 1986.

The Hull Olympiques finished first overall in the regular season, winning their first Jean Rougeau Trophy, and won their first President's Cup, defeating the Drummondville Voltigeurs in the finals.

== Team changes ==
- The Quebec Remparts suspend operations becoming dormant.
- The Laval Voisins are renamed the Laval Titan.

== Final standings ==
Note: GP = Games played; W = Wins; L = Losses; T = Ties; PTS = Points; GF = Goals for; GA = Goals against

Dilio Division	GP	W	L	T	Pts	GF	GA
Drummondville Voltigeurs	72	40	28	4	84	342	308
Trois-Rivières Draveurs	72	36	34	2	72	393	331
Chicoutimi Saguenéens	72	34	34	4	72	393	351
Shawinigan Cataractes	72	32	38	2	66	353	361
Granby Bisons	72	23	46	3	49	333	444

Lebel Division	GP	W	L	T	Pts	GF	GA
Hull Olympiques	72	54	18	0	108	423	262
Verdun Junior Canadiens	72	38	31	3	79	358	364
Laval Titan	72	37	34	1	74	406	386
Saint-Jean Castors	72	35	33	4	74	350	377
Longueuil Chevaliers	72	18	51	3	39	302	419

- complete list of standings.

== Scoring leaders ==
Note: GP = Games played; G = Goals; A = Assists; Pts = Points; PIM = Penalties in Minutes

Player	Team	GP	G	A	Pts	PIM
Luc Robitaille	Hull Olympiques	63	68	123	191	93
Guy Rouleau	Longueuil / Hull	62	91	100	191	72
Michel Mongeau	Laval Titan	72	71	109	180	45
Patrick Emond	Chicoutimi Saguenéens	71	69	98	167	32
Vincent Damphousse	Laval Titan	69	45	110	155	70
Jimmy Carson	Verdun Junior Canadiens	69	70	83	153	46
Stephane Lebeau	Shawinigan Cataractes	72	69	77	146	22
Patrice Lefebvre	Shawinigan Cataractes	69	38	98	136	146
Marc Fortier	Chicoutimi Saguenéens	71	47	86	133	49
Jocelyn Lemieux	Laval Titan	71	57	68	125	131

- complete scoring statistics

== Playoffs ==
Luc Robitaille was the leading scorer of the playoffs with 44 points (17 goals, 27 assists).

Quarterfinals

- Hull Olympiques defeated Shawinigan Cataractes 5 games to 0.
- Drummondville Voltigeurs defeated Chicoutimi Saguenéens 5 games to 4.
- Saint-Jean Castors defeated Verdun Junior Canadiens 5 games to 0.
- Laval Titan defeated Trois-Rivières Draveurs 5 games to 0.

Semifinals

- Hull Olympiques defeated Saint-Jean Castors 5 games to 0.
- Drummondville Voltigeurs defeated Laval Titan 5 games to 4.

Finals

- Hull Olympiques defeated Drummondville Voltigeurs 5 games to 0.

== All-star teams ==
First team

- Goaltender - Robert Desjardins, Hull Olympiques
- Left defence - Jean-Marc Richard, Chicoutimi Saguenéens
- Right defence - Sylvain Cote, Hull Olympiques
- Left winger - Luc Robitaille, Hull Olympiques
- Centreman - Guy Rouleau, Longueuil Chevaliers
- Right winger - Jocelyn Lemieux, Laval Titan
- Coach - Pat Burns, Hull Olympiques

Second team

- Goaltender - Vincent Riendeau, Drummondville Voltigeurs
- Left defence - Donald Dufresne, Trois-Rivières Draveurs
- Right defence - James Gasseau, Drummondville Voltigeurs
- Left winger - Philippe Bozon, Saint-Jean Castors & Vincent Damphousse, Laval Titan
- Centreman - Jimmy Carson, Verdun Junior Canadiens & Michel Mongeau, Laval Titan
- Right winger - Patrice Lefebvre, Shawinigan Cataractes
- Coach - Michel Parizeau, Drummondville Voltigeurs
- List of First/Second/Rookie team all-stars.

== Trophies and awards ==
Team

- President's Cup - Playoff Champions, Hull Olympiques
- Jean Rougeau Trophy - Regular Season Champions, Hull Olympiques
- Robert Lebel Trophy - Team with best GAA, Hull Olympiques

Player

- Michel Brière Memorial Trophy - Most Valuable Player, Guy Rouleau, Hull Olympiques
- Jean Béliveau Trophy - Top Scorer, Guy Rouleau, Longueuil Chevaliers
- Guy Lafleur Trophy - Playoff MVP, Sylvain Cote, & Luc Robitaille, Hull Olympiques
- Jacques Plante Memorial Trophy - Best GAA, Robert Desjardins, Hull Olympiques
- Emile Bouchard Trophy - Defenceman of the Year, Sylvain Cote, Hull Olympiques
- Mike Bossy Trophy - Best Pro Prospect, Jimmy Carson, Verdun Junior Canadiens
- Michel Bergeron Trophy - Offensive Rookie of the Year, Pierre Turgeon, Granby Bisons
- Raymond Lagacé Trophy - Defensive Rookie of the Year, Stephane Guerard, Shawinigan Cataractes
- Frank J. Selke Memorial Trophy - Most sportsmanlike player, Jimmy Carson, Verdun Junior Canadiens
- Marcel Robert Trophy - Best Scholastic Player, Bernard Morin, Laval Titan

== See also ==
- 1986 Memorial Cup
- 1986 NHL entry draft
- 1985–86 OHL season
- 1985–86 WHL season

Preceded by 1984–85 QMJHL season	QMJHL seasons	Succeeded by 1986–87 QMJHL season
