= Gilles-Courteau Trophy =

Award presented by the Quebec Major Junior Hockey League

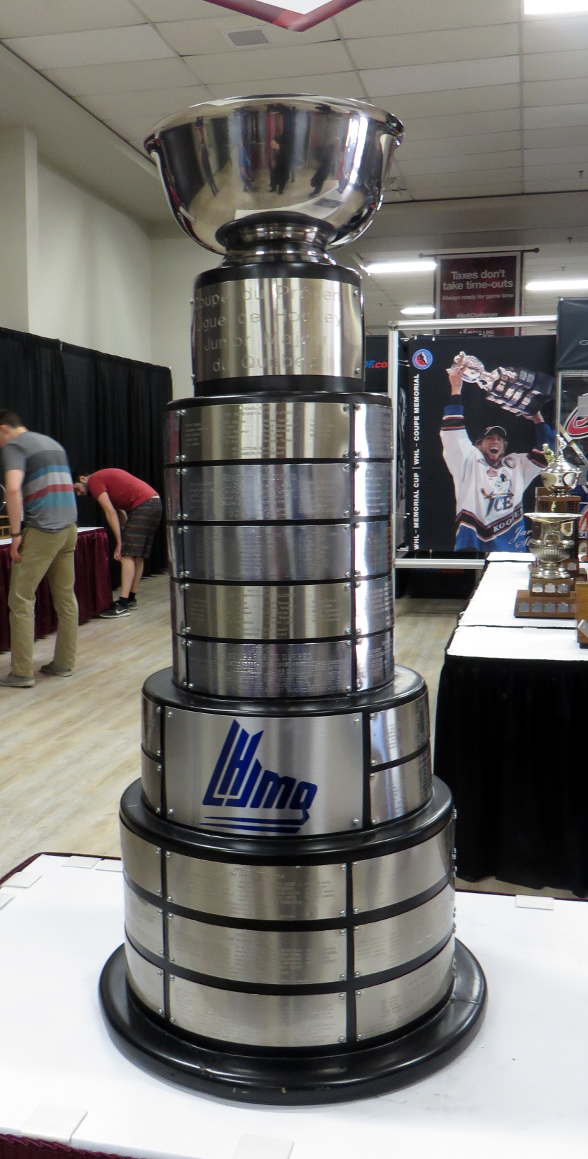
- Sport: Ice hockey
- Competition: Quebec Maritimes Junior Hockey League
- Awarded for: Playoff championship

History
- First award: 1970
- First winner: Quebec Remparts
- Most wins: Gatineau Olympiques (7)
- Most recent: Chicoutimi Saguenéens (3)

The Gilles-Courteau Trophy is awarded annually by the Quebec Maritimes Junior Hockey League to the league's playoffs champion. On February 21, 2023, the President's Cup was renamed in honour of Gilles Courteau who announced his retirement as commissioner on December 16, 2022.

== Winners ==
Teams that went on to win the Memorial Cup are listed in bold font.

Season	Champion	Games won	Finalist
1969–70	Quebec Remparts (1)	4–0	Saint-Jérôme Alouettes
1970–71	**Quebec Remparts** (2)	4–1	Shawinigan Bruins
1971–72	**Cornwall Royals** (1)	4–2–1	Quebec Remparts
1972–73	Quebec Remparts (3)	4–3	Cornwall Royals
1973–74	Quebec Remparts (4)	4–2	Sorel Éperviers
1974–75	Sherbrooke Castors (1)	4–1	Laval National
1975–76	Quebec Remparts (5)	4–2	Sherbrooke Castors
1976–77	Sherbrooke Castors (2)	4–1	Quebec Remparts
1977–78	Trois-Rivières Draveurs (1)	4–0	Montreal Juniors
1978–79	Trois-Rivières Draveurs (2)	4–0	Sherbrooke Castors
1979–80	**Cornwall Royals** (2)	4–2	Sherbrooke Castors
1980–81	**Cornwall Royals** (3)	4–1	Trois-Rivières Draveurs
1981–82	Sherbrooke Castors (3)	4–0	Trois-Rivières Draveurs
1982–83	Verdun Juniors (1)	4–1	Longueuil Chevaliers
1983–84	Laval Voisins (1)	4–2	Longueuil Chevaliers
1984–85	Verdun Junior Canadiens (2)	4–0	Chicoutimi Saguenéens
1985–86	Hull Olympiques (1)	5–0	Drummondville Voltigeurs
1986–87	Longueuil Chevaliers (1)	4–1	Chicoutimi Saguenéens
1987–88	Hull Olympiques (2)	4–3	Drummondville Voltigeurs
1988–89	Laval Titan (2)	4–3	Victoriaville Tigres
1989–90	Laval Titan (3)	4–0	Victoriaville Tigres
1990–91	Chicoutimi Saguenéens (1)	4–0	Drummondville Voltigeurs
1991–92	Verdun Collège Français (3)	4–2	Trois-Rivières Draveurs
1992–93	Laval Titan (4)	4–1	Sherbrooke Faucons
1993–94	Chicoutimi Saguenéens (2)	4–2	Laval Titan
1994–95	Hull Olympiques (3)	4–1	Laval Titan Collège Français
1995–96	**Granby Prédateurs** (1)	4–1	Beauport Harfangs
1996–97	**Hull Olympiques** (4)	4–0	Chicoutimi Saguenéens
1997–98	Val-d'Or Foreurs (1)	4–0	Rimouski Océanic
1998–99	Acadie–Bathurst Titan (1)	4–3	Hull Olympiques
1999–2000	**Rimouski Océanic** (1)	4–1	Hull Olympiques
2000–01	Val-d'Or Foreurs (2)	4–0	Acadie–Bathurst Titan
2001–02	Victoriaville Tigres (1)	4–2	Acadie–Bathurst Titan
2002–03	Hull Olympiques (5)	4–3	Halifax Mooseheads
2003–04	Gatineau Olympiques (6)	4–1	Moncton Wildcats
2004–05	Rimouski Océanic (2)	4–0	Halifax Mooseheads
2005–06	Moncton Wildcats (1)	4–2	**Quebec Remparts**
2006–07	Lewiston Maineiacs (1)	4–0	Val-d'Or Foreurs
2007–08	Gatineau Olympiques (7)	4–1	Rouyn-Noranda Huskies
2008–09	Drummondville Voltigeurs (1)	4–3	Shawinigan Cataractes
2009–10	Moncton Wildcats (2)	4–2	Saint John Sea Dogs
2010–11	**Saint John Sea Dogs** (1)	4–2	Gatineau Olympiques
2011–12	Saint John Sea Dogs (2)	4–0	Rimouski Océanic
2012–13	**Halifax Mooseheads** (1)	4–1	Baie-Comeau Drakkar
2013–14	Val-d'Or Foreurs (3)	4–3	Baie-Comeau Drakkar
2014–15	Rimouski Océanic (3)	4–3	Quebec Remparts
2015–16	Rouyn-Noranda Huskies (1)	4–1	Shawinigan Cataractes
2016–17	Saint John Sea Dogs (3)	4–0	Blainville-Boisbriand Armada
2017–18	**Acadie–Bathurst Titan** (2)	4–2	Blainville-Boisbriand Armada
2018–19	**Rouyn-Noranda Huskies** (2)	4–2	Halifax Mooseheads
2019–20	QMJHL playoffs cancelled due to the COVID-19 pandemic – President's Cup not awarded		
2020–21	Victoriaville Tigres (2)	4–2	Val-d'Or Foreurs
2021–22	Shawinigan Cataractes (1)	4–1	Charlottetown Islanders
2022–23	**Quebec Remparts** (6)	4–2	Halifax Mooseheads
2023–24	Drummondville Voltigeurs (2)	4–0	Baie-Comeau Drakkar
2024–25	Moncton Wildcats (3)	4–2	Rimouski Océanic
2025–26	Chicoutimi Saguenéens (3)	4–2	Moncton Wildcats

== See also ==
- J. Ross Robertson Cup - OHL
- Ed Chynoweth Cup - WHL
