= 1994 Memorial Cup =

Canadian junior men's ice hockey championship

Tournament details
- Venue(s): Colisée de Laval; Laval, Quebec
- Dates: May 14–22, 1994
- Teams: 4
- Host team: Laval Titan (QMJHL)
- TV partner: TSN

Final positions
- Champions: Kamloops Blazers (WHL) (2nd title)

Tournament statistics
- Games played: 8

The Memorial Cup trophy

The 1994 Memorial Cup was held May 14–22 at the Colisée de Laval in Laval, Quebec. It was the 76th annual Memorial Cup competition and determined the major junior ice hockey champion of the Canadian Hockey League (CHL). Participating teams were the host Laval Titan from the Quebec Major Junior Hockey League, as well as the winners of the Quebec Major Junior Hockey League, Ontario Hockey League and Western Hockey League, which were the Chicoutimi Saguenéens, North Bay Centennials and Kamloops Blazers. Kamloops won their second Memorial Cup, defeating Laval in the final game.

== Teams ==
QMJHL Team OHL Team WHL Team Host Team

=== Chicoutimi Saguenéens ===
The Chicoutimi Saguenéens represented the QMJHL at the 1994 Memorial Cup. The Saguenéens finished in first place in the Dilio Division during the 1993–94 season, as they posted a record of 43-24-5, earning 91 points. Chicoutimi was the second highest scoring team in the thirteen team league, as the accumulated 340 goals. Defensively, the Saguenéens allowed 254 goals, which was the fourth fewest allowed. In the first round of the post-season, Chicoutimi defeated the Granby Bisons four games to one, advancing to the QMJHL quarter-finals. The next round of the post-season was a six team, six game round robin tournament, with the top four teams advancing to the QMJHL semi-finals. The Saguenéens finished the round robin with a 3-3-0 record, as they finished in a fourth place tie with the Sherbrooke Faucons. Chicoutimi faced Sherbrooke in the tie-breaking game, as they defeated the Faucons 4–2 to win the game and advance to the next round of the post-season. In the QMJHL semi-finals, the Saguenéens faced off against the Hull Olympiques. The series went the full seven games, as Chicoutimi was able to defeat Hull in game seven, advancing to the President's Cup. In the championship round, the Saguenéens met the Laval Titan, the top ranked team in the league during the regular season. Chicoutimi defeated Laval four games to two to win the QMJHL championship and earn a berth into the 1994 Memorial Cup.

The Saguenéens offense was led by Michel St. Jacques, as he led the team with 58 goals and 126 points in 62 games. His point total was the third highest in the QMJHL during the season. During the post-season, St. Jacques scored a team high 20 goals in 27 games. Following the season, he was awarded the Transamerica Plaque as he led the QMJHL with a +64 rating. Danny Beauregard scored 39 goals and 121 points in 61 games, ranking him second on team scoring, and sixth in overall league scoring. In the post-season, Beauregard led the Saguenéens with 16 goals and 43 points in 27 games. Aleksey Lozhkin, an import player from Belarus, scored 40 goals and 107 points in 66 games in his first QMJHL season. In the post-season, he scored nine goals and 42 points in 27 games. On defense, Steve Gosselin led Chicoutimi, as in 68 games, he scored 29 goals and 106 points. This gave the Saguenéens four players with 100+ points during the regular season. Gosselin was awarded the Shell Cup - Defensive as QMJHL Defensive Player of the Year. Gosselin was also awarded the Emile Bouchard Trophy as QMJHL Defenceman of the Year. In goal, Chicoutimi was led by top goaltending prospect Eric Fichaud. Fichaud earned a 37-21-3 record with a 3.30 GAA in 63 games played. In the post-season, Fichaud earned a 16–10 record with a 3.30 GAA and a .892 save percentage. Fichaud was awarded the Guy Lafleur Trophy as QMJHL Playoff MVP, as well as the Mike Bossy Trophy as the Best Pro Prospect in the QMJHL. Fichaud would be selected in the first round, 16th overall, by the Toronto Maple Leafs at the 1994 NHL entry draft.

The 1994 Memorial Cup was the second time in franchise history that Chicoutimi participated in the tournament. In their previous appearance at the 1991 Memorial Cup, the club finished in fourth place.

=== Kamloops Blazers ===
The Kamloops Blazers represented the Western Hockey League at the 1994 Memorial Cup. The Blazers were the top ranked team in the league during the 1993–94 season, earning a record of 50-16-6 for 106 points, winning the Scotty Munro Memorial Trophy. Kamloops scored 381 goals during the regular season, ranking them second in the sixteen team league. Defensively, the Blazers allowed a league-low 225 goals. The club earned a first round bye in the post-season, advancing straight to the West Division semi-finals against the Seattle Thunderbirds. Kamloops was able to defeat Seattle four games to two, advancing to the West Division finals. In this round of the post-season, the Blazers defeated the Portland Winter Hawks four games to two, earning a spot in the President's Cup final. In the championship round, Kamloops faced the Saskatoon Blades, who finished the season in first place in the East Division. The Blazers held off the Blades and won the WHL championship in seven games, earning a berth into the 1994 Memorial Cup.

Kamloops high scoring offense was led by Montreal Canadiens prospect Darcy Tucker, who led the club with 52 goals and 140 points in 66 games. Tucker's 140 points was the second highest point total in the WHL. In 19 post-season games, Tucker scored nine goals and a team high 27 points. Rod Stevens scored 51 goals and 109 points in 62 games for the Blazers to finish second in team scoring. New York Islanders prospect Jarrett Deuling scored 44 goals and 103 points in 70 games, as the Blazers had three 100+ point scorers on their club. Deuling led Kamloops with 13 post-season goals in 18 games. On defense, Nolan Baumgartner emerged as a top prospect for the upcoming 1994 NHL entry draft. Baumgartner scored 13 goals and 55 points in 69 games. Following the season, he would be selected by the Washington Capitals in the first round, tenth overall. In goal, the Blazers split time between Rod Branch and Steve Passmore. Branch earned a 28-6-2 record with a 3.25 GAA in 44 games, while Passmore had a 22-9-2 record with a 2.74 GAA and .909 save percentage in 36 games. Passmore played the bulk of post-season games, as in 18 games, he earned a 12–6 with a 3.28 GAA and a .900 save percentage. Passmore was awarded the airBC Trophy as the WHL Playoff Most Valuable Player.

The 1994 Memorial Cup was the fifth time in club history that Kamloops had participated in the tournament. In their most recent appearance at the 1992 Memorial Cup, the Blazers defeated the Sault Ste. Marie Greyhounds 5–4 in the final game to win the Memorial Cup. The club also appeared at the 1990 Memorial Cup, where they finished in fourth place; the 1986 Memorial Cup, where they finished in third; and at the 1984 Memorial Cup, when they were known as the Kamloops Jr. Oilers, they had a third-place finish.

=== Laval Titan ===
The Laval Titan represented the Quebec Major Junior Hockey League as the host team at the 1994 Memorial Cup. The Titan were the top club in the league during the 1993–94, as Laval finished the regular season with a 49-22-1 record, earning 99 points, and winning the Jean Rougeau Trophy for their accomplishment. Laval was the highest scoring team in the league, scoring 346 goals. Defensively, the Titan allowed 247 goals, which tied them for the second fewest in the thirteen team league. In the first round of the post-season, the Titan defeated the Victoriaville Tigres four games to one, advancing to the QMJHL quarter-finals. The quarter-finals was a six team, six game round robin tournament, in which the top four teams would advance to the QMJHL semi-finals. The Titan earned a record of 4-2-0, finishing in first place, and advancing to the next round of the playoffs. In the QMJHL semi-finals, Laval faced the Beauport Harfangs, as the Titan swept the series in four games, earning a berth into the President's Cup. In the final round, Laval faced the second ranked team in the league, the Chicoutimi Saguenéens. Chicoutimi upset Laval, winning the series in six games to claim the QMJHL championship.

The Titan high-powered offence was led by Yanick Dube, who led the QMJHL with 66 goals and 141 points in 64 games. Dube was awarded the Jean Beliveau Trophy for this achievement. Dube was also awarded the Shell Cup - Offensive Trophy as the Best Offensive Player in the QMJHL; the Paul Dumont Trophy, awarded to the QMJHL Personality of the Year; and the Frank J. Selke Memorial Trophy, awarded to the QMJHL Most Sportsmanlike Player. Marc Beaucage scored 41 goals and 101 points in 63 games to finish second in team scoring. In the post-season, Beaucage led the Titan with 18 goals and 40 points in 21 games. Daniel Goneau, a prospect for the 1994 NHL entry draft, scored 29 goals and 86 points in 68 games. Following the season, Goneau was selected by the Boston Bruins in the second round of the draft. On defense, Washington Capitals prospect Patrick Boileau scored 13 goals and 70 points in 64 games. Boileau was awarded the Marcel Robert Trophy as the QMJHL Scholastic Player of the Year. Midway during the season, the Titan acquired defenseman Alain Cote from the Granby Bisons. In 25 games with Laval, Cote scored eight goals and 33 points, while between the two clubs, he combined for 31 goals and 99 points in 64 games. Cote had a strong playoff, scoring 14 goals and 29 points in 21 games. In goal, the Titan were led by Quebec Nordiques prospect Manny Fernadez, who posted a 31-16-1 record with a 3.11 GAA and a .905 save percentage in 51 games. Fernandez was awarded the Michel Briere Memorial Trophy as the QMJHL Most Valuable Player. In the post-season, Fernandez posted a 14–5 record with a 2.62 GAA and a .914 save percentage in 19 games.

The 1994 Memorial Cup was the second consecutive appearance, and the fifth overall, by the Titan. At the 1993 Memorial Cup, Laval finished in third place. Other trips to the Memorial Cup for Laval were in the 1990 Memorial Cup, where the club placed in third; the 1989 Memorial Cup, where Laval finished in fourth place; and the 1984 Memorial Cup, which was another fourth-place finishing by the club.

=== North Bay Centennials ===
The North Bay Centennials represented the Ontario Hockey League at the 1994 Memorial Cup. The Centennials were the top regular season club in the OHL during the 1993–94, as they finished with a 46-15-5 record, earning 97 points. The club won the Hamilton Spectator Trophy for their accomplishment. North Bay scored a league high 351 goals, while the club allowed a league low 226 goals during the regular season. North Bay earned a first round bye in the post-season, advancing to the Leyden Division semi-finals, where they faced the Belleville Bulls. The Centennials defeated the Bulls four games to two, advancing to the Leyden Division finals. In this round of the post-season, North Bay faced the Ottawa 67's, winning the series four games to one, and earning a place in the J. Ross Robertson Cup finals. In the championship round, the Centennials faced the second ranked team in the league, the Detroit Junior Red Wings. North Bay was able to win a memorable seven-game series to win the OHL championship and earn a berth into the 1994 Memorial Cup.

The Centennials high-powered offence was led by Vitali Yachmenev, an import player from Russia. Yachmenev scored a league high 61 goals, while leading the Centennials with 113 points in 66 games. He was awarded the Emms Family Award as OHL Rookie of the Year. Following the season, Yachmenev was a third round draft pick by the Los Angeles Kings at the 1994 NHL entry draft. Jeff Shevalier, a Los Angeles Kings prospect, scored 52 goals and 104 points in 64 games to finish second on the team in scoring. Lee Jinman scored 31 goals and 97 points in 66 games for the club during the regular season. In the playoffs, Jinman led the Centennials with 18 goals and 37 points in 18 games. Following the season, he was selected by the Dallas Stars in the second round at the 1994 NHL entry draft. B.J. MacPherson joined the Centennials following a late-season trade from the Oshawa Generals. MacPherson scored nine goals and 30 points in 15 games with North Bay. Following the season, MacPherson was awarded the Leo Lalonde Memorial Trophy as the Best Overage Player in the OHL. On defence, the Centennials were led by Mike Burman, as he scored 13 goals and 63 points in 61 games. Brad Brown emerged as a top prospect, as he scored eight goals and 32 points in 66 games while providing solid defensive play. Brown was selected by the Montreal Canadiens in the first round, eighteenth overall, at the 1994 NHL entry draft. North Bay's goaltending duties were handled by Sandy Allan and Scott Roche. The duo won the Dave Pinkney Trophy, awarded to the Goaltenders of the Team with the fewest goals allowed. Allan, a Los Angeles Kings prospect, posted a 31-10-1 record with a 3.27 GAA and a .874 save percentage in 45 games, while Roche earned a 15-5-4 record with a 3.52 GAA and a .863 save percentage. Roche was also awarded the F.W. "Dinty" Moore Trophy, which is awarded to the OHL's First Year Goaltender with the Best GAA. Centennials head coach Bert Templeton was named the winner of the Matt Leyden Trophy, awarded to the OHL Head Coach of the Year.

The 1994 Memorial Cup was the first time in club history that the Centennials qualified for the tournament.

== Round-robin standings ==
Pos	Team	Pld	W	L	GF	GA	
1	Kamloops Blazers (WHL)	3	3	0	15	5	Advanced directly to the championship game
2	Chicoutimi Saguenéens (QMJHL)	3	2	1	5	6	Advanced to the semifinal game
3	Laval Titan (QMJHL rep and host)	3	1	2	9	11	Advanced to the semifinal game
4	North Bay Centennials (OHL)	3	0	3	6	13	

== Scores ==
Round-robin

- May 14 – Laval 5–4 North Bay (OT)
- May 15 – Kamloops 5–4 Laval
- May 15 – Chicoutimi 3–1 North Bay
- May 17 – Kamloops 5–0 Chicoutimi
- May 18 – Kamloops 5–1 North Bay
- May 19 – Chicoutimi 2–0 Laval

Semi-final

- May 21 – Laval 4–2 Chicoutimi

Final

- May 22 – Kamloops 5–3 Laval

=== Winning roster ===
1993-94 Kamloops Blazers
Goaltenders: – Rod Branch; – Sean Matile; – Steve Passmore	Defencemen: – Nolan Baumgartner; – Scott Ferguson; – Jason Holland; – Aaron Keller; – Mike Krooshoop; – Brad Lukowich; – Jason Strudwick	Wingers: – Jarrett Deuling; – Shane Doan; – Greg Hart; – Ryan Huska; – Jarome Iginla; – Mike Josephson; – Chris Murray; – Tyson Nash; – Darcy Tucker; – Bob Westerby	Centres: – Hnat Domenichelli; – Louis Dumont; – Bob Maudie; – Rod Stevens; Coach: Don Hay; General Manager: Bob Brown

== Award winners ==
- Stafford Smythe Memorial Trophy (MVP): Darcy Tucker, Kamloops
- George Parsons Trophy (Sportsmanship): Yanick Dube, Laval
- Hap Emms Memorial Trophy (Goaltender): Eric Fichaud, Chicoutimi

All-star team

- Goal: Eric Fichaud, Chicoutimi
- Defence: Aaron Keller, Kamloops; Nolan Baumgartner, Kamloops
- Centre: Darcy Tucker, Kamloops
- Left wing: Alain Cote, Laval
- Right wing: Rod Stevens, Kamloops
