= Éric Dazé =

American ice hockey player (born 1975)

- Born: July 2, 1975 (age 51) Montreal, Quebec, Canada
- Height: 6 ft 6 in (198 cm)
- Weight: 235 lb (107 kg; 16 st 11 lb)
- Position: Winger
- Shot: Left
- Played for: Chicago Blackhawks
- National team: Canada
- NHL draft: 90th overall, 1993; Chicago Blackhawks
- Playing career: 1994–2005

Éric Dazé (born July 2, 1975) is a Canadian former professional ice hockey winger who played for the Chicago Blackhawks of the National Hockey League (NHL) for eleven seasons from 1995 to 2005.

== Playing career ==
=== Amateur ===
Éric Dazé began his career playing midget with Laval in Quebec AAA Midget Hockey League. Dazé was selected by the Hull Olympiques of the Quebec Major Junior Hockey League (QMJHL) in the fourth round, 44th overall in the 1991 QMJHL entry draft. He was returned him to AAA in his first year of QMJHL eligibility, making only one appearance in the QMJHL with Hull. In the 1992–93 season, he made the Olympiques but was little used before being traded to the Beauport Harfangs late in the season for defenceman Jamie Bird. In 55 games with Hull, he recorded 13 goals and 19 assists for 32 points. He broke out with Beauport, tallying six goals and 23 points in 13 games. In his third season and first full one with Beauport in 1993–94, he tallied 59 goals and 107 points in 66 games. The Harfangs qualified for the playoffs and advanced to the league semifinals where they were knocked out by the Laval Titan. In 15 playoff games, he recorded 16 goals and 24 points. Dazé was named to the QMJHL First All-Star Team and the Canadian Hockey League (CHL) Third All-Star Team. In his final season in the QMJHL, he marked 54 goals and 99 points in 57 games for the Harfangs. Beauport made it to the semifinals again, only to be eliminated by the Olympiques. In 16 playoff games, he added nine goals and 21 points. He was named to the QMJHL First All-Star Team, the CHL Third All-Star Team and awarded the CHL's Top Prospect Award, and the QMJHL's Frank J. Selke Memorial Trophy for most sportsmanlike and the Paul Dumont Trophy as the QMJHL's personality of the year.

=== Professional ===
Dazé was selected by the Chicago Blackhawks of the National Hockey League (NHL) in the fourth round, 90th overall, of the 1993 NHL entry draft, with the draft pick the Blackhawks received with Stéphane Beauregard in exchange for Dominik Hašek. In March 1995, the Blackhawks signed Dazé to a three-year contract. After his QMJHL team was eliminated from their playoffs, Dazé joined the Blackhawks on April 27 and made his NHL debut on April 28 in a 5–1 victory over the Dallas Stars. He scored his first NHL goal in his second game on April 30, assisted by Denis Savard, in a 4–0 shutout win over the Detroit Red Wings. He finished the 1994–95 season with four games played, registering one goal and two points. The Blackhawks qualified for the playoffs and Dazé made his NHL playoff debut on May 7 in the team's first round series with the Toronto Maple Leafs. The Blackhawks got past the Maple Leafs and advanced to the second round versus the Vancouver Canucks. Dazé recorded his first playoff point assisting on Jim Cummins' goal in a 2–0 victory on May 23. The Blackhawks eliminated the Canucks and moved on to face the Red Wings, who ended the team's playoff run in the Western Conference final. In 16 playoff games, Dazé had just the one assist.

Despite scoring goals at a regular pace, his detractors disliked his lack of physical play. He scored at least 20 goals in each season between 1996 and 2003, even when struggling with injuries. He displayed a combination of size, good scoring ability and possessed a quick, accurate shot. He had early success in the 1995–96 season, scoring 30 goals and 53 points in 80 games. He spent most of his first season on the second line, but saw some time on the first line as an injury replacement. In the playoffs he recorded a three-point game against the Calgary Flames in their first round series on April 21, 1996, scoring twice and assisting on another by Tony Amonte in a 7–5 victory. The Blackhawks made it to the second round where they were eliminated by the Colorado Avalanche. In ten playoff games, he scored three goals and eight points. He was named to the NHL All-Rookie Team and finished second in the Calder Memorial Trophy voting for rookie of the year. In the following 1996–97 season, he missed the beginning of the season with an ankle sprain. Upon his return, he was placed on the second line alongside Savard or Murray Craven at centre and Kevin Miller on the opposite wing. However, as the Blackhawks struggled for scoring, head coach Craig Hartsburg bounced Dazé around the lineup, playing him on the first line with Alexei Zhamnov and James Black and then with Jeff Shantz and Ethan Moreau on the fourth line. On January 22, 1997, he tallied three assists on two goals by Miller and one by Shantz in a 4–3 loss to the Vancouver Canucks. In the final game of the season on April 13, he marked his first career hat trick and added an assist in a 5–2 victory over the Dallas Stars. He finished the season with 22 goals and 41 points in 71 games. The Blackhawks were eliminated by the Avalanche in the playoffs for the second consecutive year. In the six-game series, he scored two goals and three points.

To begin the 1997–98 season, he found himself on the third line with Shantz and Moreau. On December 30 he recorded a three-point game, scoring twice and assisting on another by James Black in a 6–2 win over the New Jersey Devils. By January 1998, he was on the second line with Greg Johnson and Dmitri Nabokov. On March 15, he set a new career-high in goals in a game when he tallied four in a 6–2 victory over the Florida Panthers. He finished the season with 31 goals and 42 points in 80 games as the Blackhawks missed the playoffs. A restricted free agent in the offseason, Dazé was unhappy with the Blackhawks initial offer and held out for a month before agreeing to a three-year deal with the team in September. He lined up with prize free agent signing Doug Gilmour and Chad Kilger on the team's first line to start the 1998–99 season, however, by the end of the month he and Kilger were replaced by Amonte and Moreau. In December, new head coach Dirk Graham moved Dazé back to the first line alongside Gilmour and Bob Probert in an effort to spark his offence. In January 1999, Dazé suffered a pulled groin, causing him to miss six games. Upon his return, he and Kilger were placed on a line with Moreau. However, this could not turn around the Blackhawks fortunes and Graham was replaced by Lorne Molleken as head coach. Molleken moved Dazé to the fourth line with Todd White and Jean-Yves Leroux. Dazé continued to be put with new linemates, this time seeing some success with Josef Marha and Jean-Pierre Dumont. The Blackhawks failed to make the playoffs for the second straight season and Dazé finished the campaign with 22 goals and 42 points.

The Dazé–Marha–Dumont line was resurrected for the 1999–2000 season, but after Dumont went down with an injury, Kyle Calder took his place. However, the line juggling began in November as the Blackhawks struggled and Dazé had new linemates as players came in and out of the lineup. December saw a coaching upheaval again, as Molleken got demoted and Bob Pulford took over as head coach. On December 4, Dazé recorded a four-point night, scoring twice and assisting on two others in a 9–3 victory over the Boston Bruins. In March 2000, Dazé suffered a herniated disc in his back that required surgery and ended his season. He finished the season with 23 goals and 36 points in 59 games.

The 2000–01 season began with another coaching change, with Alpo Suhonen taking over as head coach. Entering the season there were hopes that Dazé would rebound from the previous season. However, Dazé and Suhonen did not agree on the player's role and Dazé spent the first month of the season bouncing among the lines before being scratched all together. That caused Dazé to request a trade at the end of October. No trade appeared and instead, Dazé was reinserted on the first line alongside Zhamnov and Amonte. On November 11, he tallied three points, scoring twice and assisted on another by Zhamnov in a 3–3 tie with the Maple Leafs. He repeated the feat on November 27 in a 6–5 win over the Red Wings. By the end of December, Dazé was back down on the third line alongside rookies Mark Bell and Chris Herperger. On January 3, 2001, he scored once and assisted on two others by Herperger and Michael Nylander in a 6–0 win over the Canucks. By the end of January, he was back on the first line alongside Herperger and Amonte. On February 25, he had another three-point game, scoring twice and assisting on another by Herperger in a 6–4 win over the Maple Leafs. That season, he became a key part of the Blackhawks' penalty killing unit. There was another coaching change towards the end of the season in March. With the Blackhawks eliminated from the postseason, Suhonen left the team for medical reasons and Denis Savard took over as head coach on an interim basis. Dazé finished the season scoring 33 goals and 57 points in 79 games.

A restricted free agent going into the 2001 offseason, he signed a new deal with the Blackhawks in August 2001. The season began with another coaching change, with Brian Sutter taking over as head coach for the 2001–02 season. Dazé was placed on the team's second line by Sutter, alongside Nylander and Steve Sullivan. He recorded a three-point night on October 25, scoring once and assisting on goals by Calder and Jon Klemm in a 4–2 win over the San Jose Sharks. On December 7 he recorded a hat trick in a 4–3 victory over the New York Islanders. Then on December 31, he tallied another hat trick and added an assist in a four-point effort in a 6–5 overtime victory over the Ottawa Senators. In January he tallied another three-point game, scoring one and assisting on goals by Calder and Jaroslav Špaček in a 5–4 loss to the Columbus Blue Jackets. He was selected to play in the NHL All-Star Game in February 2002. Dazé who was appearing in his first All-Star Game, was named the game's most valuable player (two goals/one assist), becoming the first Blackhawk player to win the award since Bobby Hull in 1971. On March 7, he had another three-point game, scoring once and assisting on two others in a 5–1 victory over the New York Rangers. He finished the regular season with a career-high 38 goals, 32 assists for 70 points in 82 games. The Blackhawks qualified for the playoffs and faced the St. Louis Blues in the opening round. The Blues eliminated the Blackhawks and Dazé was among those criticized by the media for the team's failure, having gone scoreless in the series.

In the 2002 offseason, Dazé underwent surgery again for a herniated disc in his back and missed the first 15 games of the 2002–03 season. He returned to the lineup on November 15 in a 2–2 tie with the Washington Capitals. He was placed on the team's top line alongside Zhamnov and Sullivan. On December 11, he marked his fifth career hat trick in a 4–3 win over the Rangers. In early January 2003, he missed more time with a sore back. On March 5 he tallied five points, recording his sixth career hat trick and added two assists in an 8–5 win over the Bruins. In the final game of his season on April 6, Dazé scored twice and assisted on another by Igor Radulov in a 4–3 win over the Red Wings. In total, he missed 28 games that season with a multitude of issues, including his back, an infected ankle, and a pulled groin. He made 59 appearances, scoring 23 goals and 36 points as the Blackhawks failed to make the playoffs. Dazé ran into severe back problems during his career, which limited him to only 19 games in the 2003–04 season. Even after three herniated disc surgeries pain was still a problem in Dazé's back when he attempted to return to the Blackhawks in 2005. He quietly left professional hockey after appearing in only the season opener that year.

== International play ==
Medal record

Representing Canada

Ice hockey

IIHF World U20 Championship
Gold medal – first place	1995 Canada	

Dazé was selected to play for Canada's junior team at the 1995 World Junior Championships. He finished fourth in team scoring in the tournament, with eight goals and ten points in seven games. He made the tournament all-star team as the team earned the gold medal. He made his debut with Canada' senior team at the 1998 IIHF World Championship in May 1998. He tallied one goal and five points in three games in the tournament. Canada was knocked out of the tournament early, losing before the medal rounds. He returned to the national team for the 1999 IIHF World Championship, but missed the first round due to a knee injury, only joining the lineup at the beginning of the quarterfinal round. He appeared in only two games, registering one assist, as Canada lost the bronze medal game to finish fourth in the tournament.

== Post-playing career ==
Dazé joined the United States Hockey League's Chicago Steel as a scout for the Quebec and Illinois areas.

== Personal life ==
Dazé is married to Guylaine, whom he met during his high school years. The couple have two children and the family resides in Hinsdale, Illinois.

== Career statistics ==
=== Regular season and playoffs ===
			Regular season					Playoffs
Season	Team	League	GP	G	A	Pts	PIM	GP	G	A	Pts	PIM
1990–91	Laval Régents	QMAAA	30	25	20	45	30	—	—	—	—	—
1991–92	Laval Régents	QMAAA	35	30	29	59	40	12	8	10	18	8
1991–92	Hull Olympiques	QMJHL	1	0	0	0	0	—	—	—	—	—
1992–93	Hull Olympiques	QMJHL	55	13	19	32	14	—	—	—	—	—
1992–93	Beauport Harfangs	QMJHL	13	6	17	23	10	—	—	—	—	—
1993–94	Beauport Harfangs	QMJHL	66	59	48	107	31	15	16	8	24	2
1994–95	Beauport Harfangs	QMJHL	57	54	45	99	20	16	9	12	21	23
1994–95	Chicago Blackhawks	NHL	4	1	1	2	2	16	0	1	1	4
1995–96	Chicago Blackhawks	NHL	80	30	23	53	18	10	3	5	8	0
1996–97	Chicago Blackhawks	NHL	71	22	19	41	16	6	2	1	3	2
1997–98	Chicago Blackhawks	NHL	80	31	11	42	22	—	—	—	—	—
1998–99	Chicago Blackhawks	NHL	72	22	20	42	22	—	—	—	—	—
1999–00	Chicago Blackhawks	NHL	59	23	13	36	28	—	—	—	—	—
2000–01	Chicago Blackhawks	NHL	79	33	24	57	16	—	—	—	—	—
2001–02	Chicago Blackhawks	NHL	82	38	32	70	36	5	0	0	0	2
2002–03	Chicago Blackhawks	NHL	54	22	22	44	14	—	—	—	—	—
2003–04	Chicago Blackhawks	NHL	19	4	7	11	0	—	—	—	—	—
2005–06	Chicago Blackhawks	NHL	1	0	0	0	2	—	—	—	—	—
NHL totals			601	226	172	398	176	37	5	7	12	8

=== International ===
Year	Team	Event	GP	G	A	Pts	PIM
1995	Canada	WJC	7	8	2	10	0
1998	Canada	WC	3	1	4	5	0
1999	Canada	WC	2	0	1	1	0
Junior totals			7	8	2	10	0
Senior totals			5	1	5	6	0

== Awards ==
- 1994 — QMJHL First All-Star Team
- 1995 — QMJHL First All-Star Team
- 1995 — QMJHL Frank J. Selke Memorial Trophy (Most Gentlemanly Player)
- 1995 — CHL Sportsman of the Year Award
- 1996 — NHL All-Rookie Team
- 2002 — Played in NHL All-Star Game
- 2002 — NHL All-Star Game MVP

== See also ==
- List of NHL players who spent their entire career with one franchise

== Bibliography ==
- Podnieks, Andrew (1998). Red, White, and Gold: Canada at the World Junior Championships 1974–1999. Toronto: ECW Press. ISBN 1-55022-382-8.

Preceded by Yanick Dubé	Winner of the CHL Sportsman of the Year Award; 1995	Succeeded by Hnat Domenichelli

Preceded by Yanick Dubé	Winner of the QMJHL Frank J. Selke Memorial Trophy; 1995	Succeeded by Christian Dubé
