= Nolan Baumgartner =

Canadian ice hockey player (born 1976)

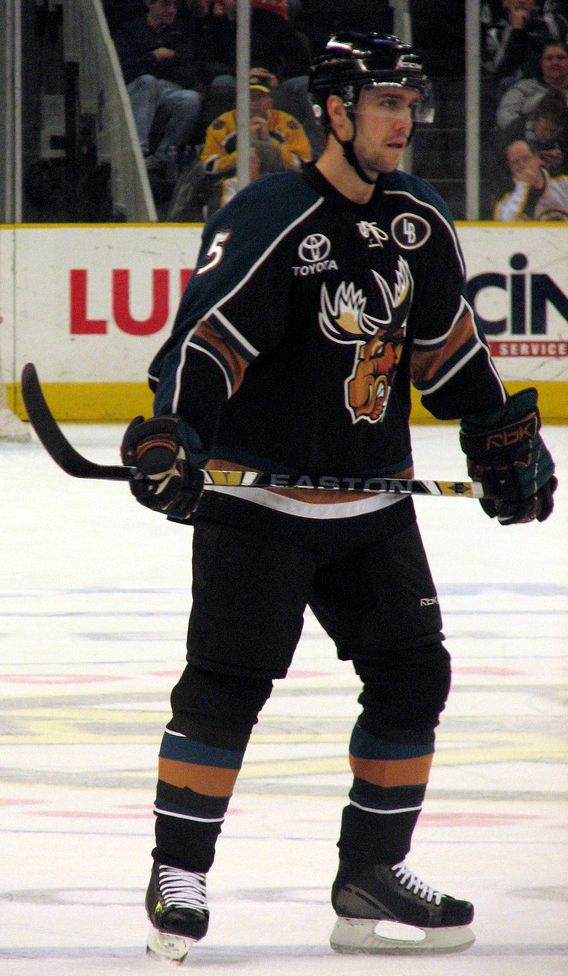
- Baumgartner with the Manitoba Moose
- Born: March 23, 1976 (age 50) Calgary, Alberta, Canada
- Height: 6 ft 2 in (188 cm)
- Weight: 195 lb (88 kg; 13 st 13 lb)
- Position: Defence
- Shot: Right
- Played for: Washington Capitals; Chicago Blackhawks; Vancouver Canucks; Pittsburgh Penguins; Philadelphia Flyers; Dallas Stars
- NHL draft: 10th overall, 1994; Washington Capitals
- Playing career: 1996–2012

Nolan Baumgartner (born March 23, 1976) is a Canadian professional ice hockey coach and former player. He is currently an assistant coach for the Ottawa Senators of the National Hockey League (NHL). He was formerly an assistant coach with the Vancouver Canucks of the NHL. Baumgartner was selected by the Washington Capitals in the 1st round (10th overall) of the 1994 NHL entry draft. He played parts of ten seasons in the National Hockey League (NHL) for six different teams between 1995 and 2010. Baumgartner played only one full season in the NHL, 2005–06 with the Vancouver Canucks, and spent most of his playing career in the AHL.

== Playing career ==
Coming off a 1994 Memorial Cup championship with the Kamloops Blazers of the WHL, Baumgartner was chosen by the Washington Capitals in the first round, 10th overall of the 1994 NHL entry draft. Upon being drafted, he returned to the WHL and joined future NHLers Darcy Tucker, Shane Doan and Jarome Iginla to capture a second consecutive Memorial Cup in 1995. Baumgartner was named to the Memorial Cup All-Star Team for the second consecutive year. En route to the CHL championship, Baumgartner was distinguished with the airBC Trophy as the WHL playoffs MVP after scoring 17 points in 21 games and at the season's end, he was also awarded the Bill Hunter Trophy as the league's best defenceman.

Baumgartner's NHL career got off to an uneven start due to a serious shoulder injury. After playing the majority of his tenure in Washington with the Capitals' American Hockey League affiliate, the Portland Pirates, he was traded to the Chicago Blackhawks on July 20, 2000, for Rémi Royer. Baumgartner would continue to play in the AHL with Chicago's minor league affiliate, the Norfolk Admirals.

On July 11, 2002, he was signed as a free agent by the Vancouver Canucks. After one season with the Canucks, he was left unprotected for the 2003 NHL Waiver Draft and selected by the Pittsburgh Penguins on October 3, 2003. However, after just five games with the Penguins, he was placed on waivers again and reclaimed by Vancouver on November 1. Playing with the Canucks' AHL affiliate, Baumgartner captained the Manitoba Moose in the season of 2003–04 and scored, 27 points. As the Moose began play at the newly opened MTS Center in 2004–05, Baumgartner earned the distinction of scoring the first ever professional goal at the arena, on November 17, 2004. When NHL play resumed the following season, Baumgartner cracked the Canucks regular lineup and set NHL career highs in every statistical category, as well as leading all team defencemen with 34 points.

Following Baumgartner's breakout season, he became an unrestricted free agent, and on July 1, 2006, he signed a two-year deal with the Philadelphia Flyers. However, after six games, he was waived on October 17, 2006, and assigned to the Philadelphia Phantoms of the AHL a week later. Baumgartner was claimed on re-entry waivers by the Dallas Stars on February 24, 2007, and after spending the 2007–08 season with Dallas's AHL affiliate, the Iowa Stars, Baumgartner was reassigned by Dallas to the Manitoba Moose.

On July 2, 2008, he returned for a third stint with the Canucks, signing a one-year, two-way contract. He continued to play in the AHL for the Moose in 2008–09 and recorded 33 points in 72 games. He helped the Moose to the 2009 Calder Cup Finals, where they were defeated by the Hershey Bears. The following season, Baumgartner was named captain of the Canadian team for the 2010 AHL All-Star Game. He was called up by the Canucks on January 22, 2010, to replace injured defenceman Sami Salo.

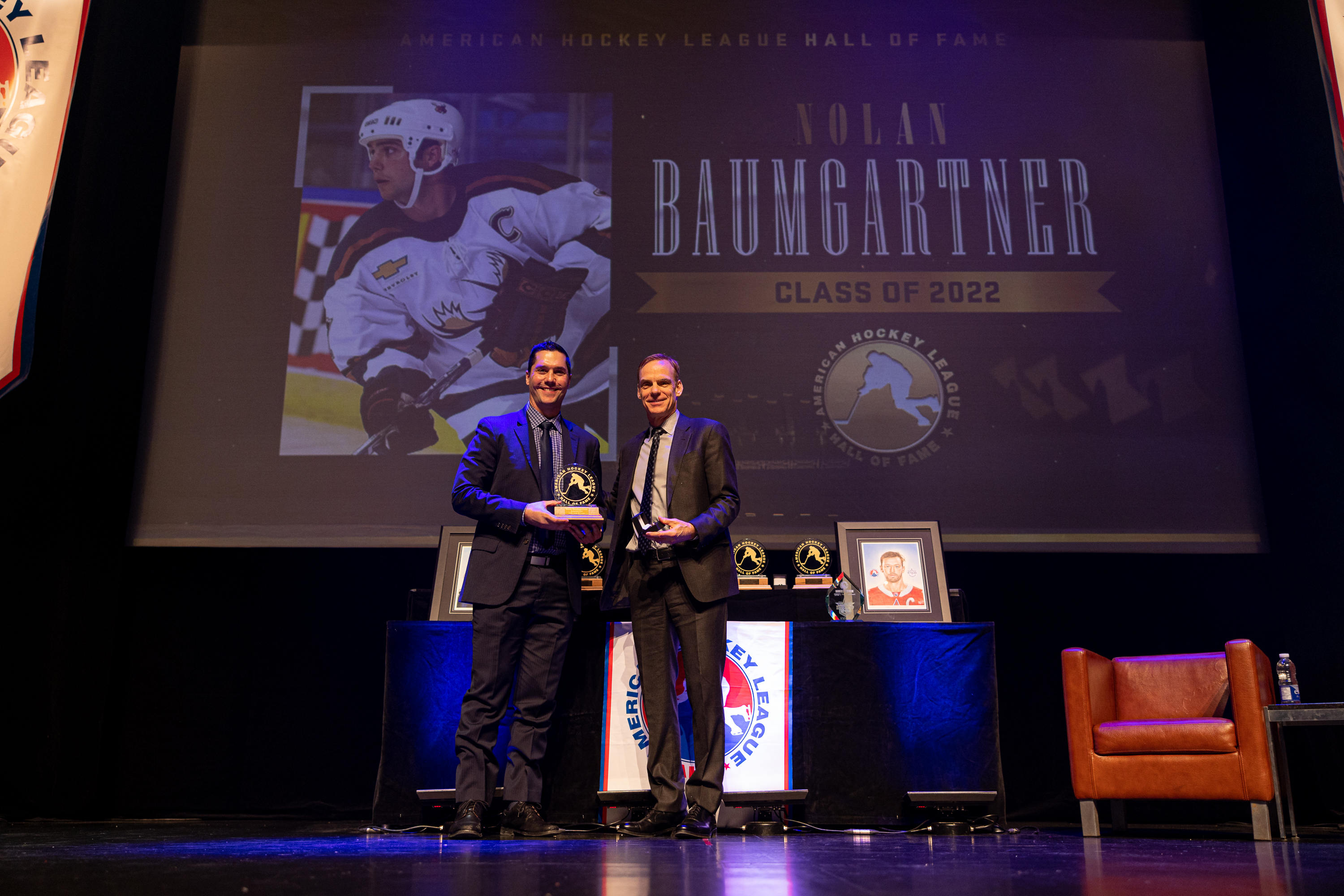
Baumgartner and Scott Howson during Baumgartner's AHL Hall of Fame induction ceremony.

On October 20, 2010, Baumgartner was named captain of the Manitoba Moose. This was Baumgartner's second stint as Moose captain, when he held this position during the 2005-06 AHL season.

Baumgarter retired from hockey at the end of the 2011–12 season with the Chicago Wolves and was named an assistant coach of the team.

== International play ==
Baumgartner represented Team Canada twice in the World Junior Championships (1995, 1996), captaining the team in 1996 and capturing gold both years

== Coaching career ==
On July 6, 2012 the Vancouver Canucks announced that Baumgartner would be an assistant coach with their AHL affiliate in Chicago. On June 14, 2013 The Vancouver Canucks relocated their AHL team to Utica, New York. Baumgartner was subsequently hired to be an assistant coach with the new Utica Comets. On June 7, 2017, Baumgartner was named as an assistant coach of the Vancouver Canucks. Baumgartner was relieved of his duties by the Canucks on December 5, 2021 alongside head coach Travis Green

Baumgartner was hired on June 4, 2024 as an assistant coach with the Ottawa Senators.

== Awards ==
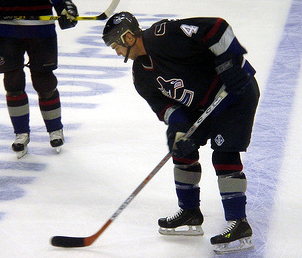
Baumgartner with the Canucks during the 2005–06 season.

Major Junior

- Memorial Cup championship (Kamloops Blazers) - 1994, 1995
- Memorial Cup All-Star Team - 1994, 1995
- airBC Trophy (WHL playoff MVP) - 1995
- Bill Hunter Trophy (WHL's best defenceman) - 1995, 1996
- CHL Defenceman of the Year - 1995
- WHL West First All-Star Team - 1995, 1996

AHL

- AHL All-Star Game appearance - 2005, 2007*, 2010**

*starter, **captain of Canadian All-Stars

International

- World Junior gold (Team Canada) - 1995, 1996
- World Junior All-Star Team - 1996

== Career statistics ==
=== Regular season and playoffs ===
			Regular season					Playoffs
Season	Team	League	GP	G	A	Pts	PIM	GP	G	A	Pts	PIM
1992–93	Kamloops Blazers	WHL	43	0	5	5	30	11	1	1	2	0
1993–94	Kamloops Blazers	WHL	69	13	42	55	109	19	3	14	17	16
1993–94	Kamloops Blazers	M-Cup	—	—	—	—	—	4	0	2	2	4
1994–95	Kamloops Blazers	WHL	62	8	36	44	71	21	4	13	17	16
1994–95	Kamloops Blazers	M-Cup	—	—	—	—	—	4	0	6	6	6
1995–96	Washington Capitals	NHL	1	0	0	0	0	1	0	0	0	10
1995–96	Kamloops Blazers	WHL	28	13	15	28	45	16	1	9	10	26
1996–97	Portland Pirates	AHL	8	2	2	4	4	—	—	—	—	—
1997–98	Washington Capitals	NHL	4	0	1	1	0	—	—	—	—	—
1997–98	Portland Pirates	AHL	70	2	24	26	70	10	1	4	5	10
1998–99	Washington Capitals	NHL	5	0	0	0	0	—	—	—	—	—
1998–99	Portland Pirates	AHL	38	5	14	19	62	—	—	—	—	—
1999–00	Washington Capitals	NHL	8	0	1	1	2	—	—	—	—	—
1999–00	Portland Pirates	AHL	71	5	18	23	56	4	1	2	3	10
2000–01	Chicago Blackhawks	NHL	8	0	0	0	6	—	—	—	—	—
2000–01	Norfolk Admirals	AHL	63	5	28	33	75	9	2	3	5	11
2001–02	Norfolk Admirals	AHL	76	10	24	34	72	4	0	1	1	2
2002–03	Vancouver Canucks	NHL	8	1	2	3	4	2	0	0	0	0
2002–03	Manitoba Moose	AHL	59	8	31	39	82	1	0	0	0	4
2003–04	Pittsburgh Penguins	NHL	5	0	0	0	2	—	—	—	—	—
2003–04	Vancouver Canucks	NHL	9	0	3	3	2	—	—	—	—	—
2003–04	Manitoba Moose	AHL	55	6	21	27	101	—	—	—	—	—
2004–05	Manitoba Moose	AHL	78	9	30	39	51	14	0	4	4	10
2005–06	Vancouver Canucks	NHL	70	5	29	34	30	—	—	—	—	—
2006–07	Philadelphia Flyers	NHL	6	0	1	1	21	—	—	—	—	—
2006–07	Philadelphia Phantoms	AHL	51	6	20	26	46	—	—	—	—	—
2006–07	Dallas Stars	NHL	7	0	2	2	0	—	—	—	—	—
2007–08	Iowa Stars	AHL	56	5	13	18	47	—	—	—	—	—
2007–08	Manitoba Moose	AHL	18	0	6	6	10	3	0	1	1	4
2008–09	Manitoba Moose	AHL	72	11	22	33	50	22	0	5	5	22
2009–10	Vancouver Canucks	NHL	12	1	1	2	2	1	0	0	0	0
2009–10	Manitoba Moose	AHL	37	3	9	12	22	—	—	—	—	—
2010–11	Manitoba Moose	AHL	66	4	25	29	36	14	0	3	3	10
2011–12	Chicago Wolves	AHL	60	2	20	22	31	5	0	2	2	2
AHL totals			887	83	307	390	815	86	4	25	29	75
NHL totals			143	7	40	47	69	4	0	0	0	10

=== International ===
Medal record

Ice hockey

Representing Canada

World Junior Championships
Gold medal – first place	1996 United States	
Gold medal – first place	1995 Canada	

Year	Team	Event
GP	G	A	Pts	PIM	1995	Canada	WJC	7	0	1	1	4
1996	Canada	WJC	6	1	1	2	22
Junior totals			13	2	1	3	26

Preceded by Jason Allison	Washington Capitals first-round draft pick 1994	Succeeded by Alexander Kharlamov
