= Jason Holland (ice hockey) =

Canadian-German ice hockey player

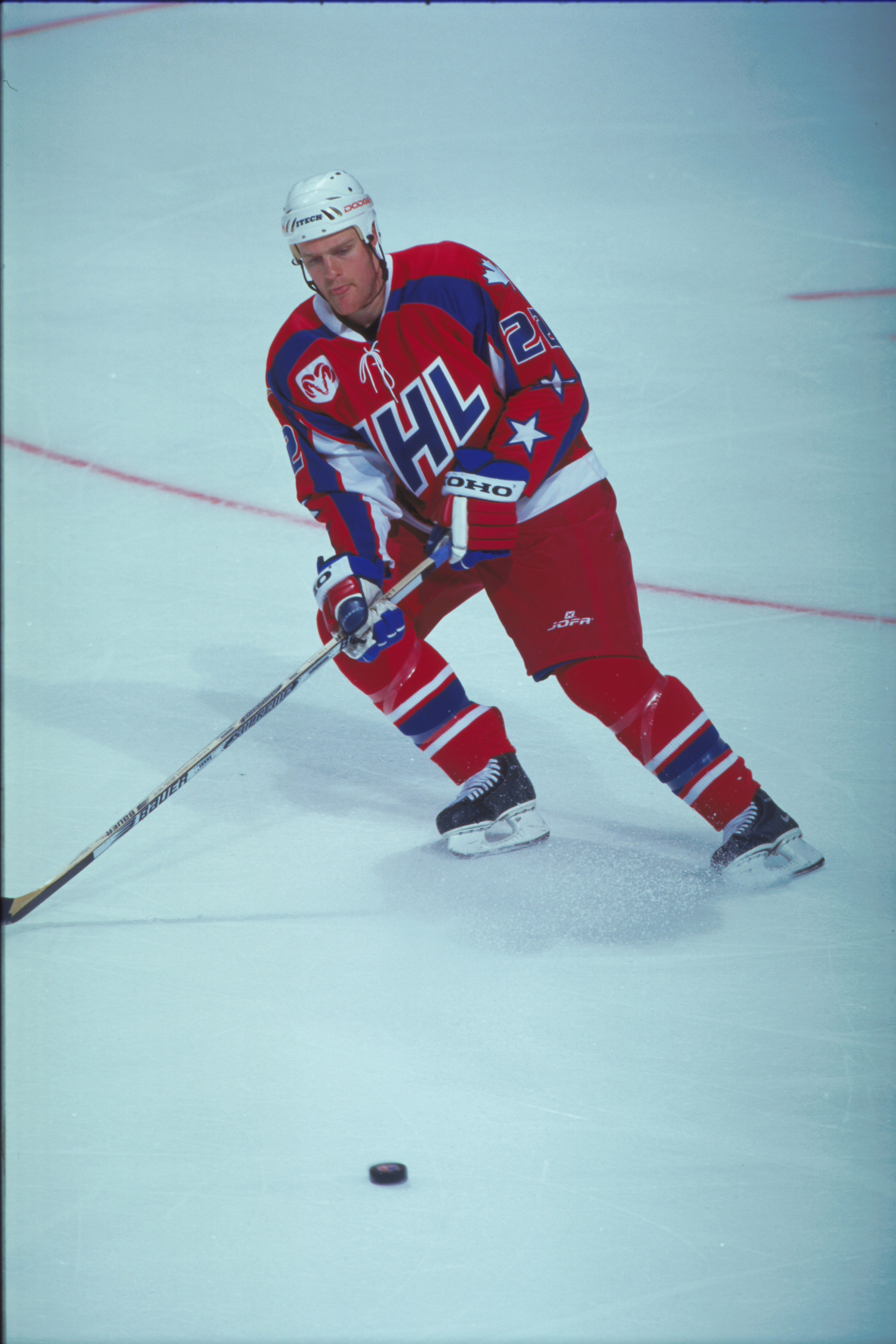
- Born: April 30, 1976 (age 49) Morinville, Alberta, Canada
- Height: 6 ft 3 in (191 cm)
- Weight: 219 lb (99 kg; 15 st 9 lb)
- Position: Defence
- Shot: Right
- Played for: New York Islanders; Buffalo Sabres; Los Angeles Kings; HC Alleghe; ERC Ingolstadt; DEG Metro Stars
- National team: Germany
- NHL draft: 38th overall, 1994; New York Islanders
- Playing career: 1996–2012

Jason Ryan Holland (born April 30, 1976) is a Canadian-German former professional ice hockey defenceman. He played 81 games in the National Hockey League and spent the last seven years of his playing career in Germany.

== Playing career ==
Holland was drafted in the second round, 38th overall, by the New York Islanders in the 1994 NHL entry draft.

After playing four seasons in the Western Hockey League with the Kamloops Blazers, winning the CHL Memorial Cup in 1994 and 1995, and playing for the victorious Canadian team at the 1996 World Junior Ice Hockey Championships, Holland made his professional debut in the American Hockey League with the Kentucky Thoroughblades during the 1996–97 season. During the same season, he made his NHL debut with the Islanders, appearing in four games.

During the 1997–98 season, Holland was traded along with Paul Kruse to the Buffalo Sabres in exchange for Jason Dawe. After three-plus seasons with the Sabres organization, mostly spent in the AHL with the Rochester Americans, Holland joined the Los Angeles Kings. Once again, most of Holland's time with the organization was spent with their AHL affiliate, in this case the Manchester Monarchs. Holland did spend the entire 2003–04 season with the Kings, appearing in 52 games and tallying six points.

Holland spent the 2005–06 season with ERC Ingolstadt of Germany's Deutsche Eishockey Liga, and remained with the team until the end of the 2008–09 season. On April 21, 2009, he signed a contract with another German DEL side, the Düsseldorfer EG Metro Stars, spending three years with the club. He retired after the 2011–12 season.

== International play ==
A Canadian of German descent, Holland received a German passport in February 2007. He was chosen to play for the German national team for 2008 World Championships and he played games against Finland and Slovakia. Germany beat Slovakia 4–2, before it was found out that Holland was ineligible to play for Germany, because he had played only three seasons in Germany, while IIHF rules state that player who has represented another country (as Holland did in 1996, playing for Canada at the Junior World Championships) might change nationality after playing four seasons in the country. German victory was in jeopardy for a short time, but finally Germany was allowed to keep the points, while Holland was suspended from the tournament.

== Career statistics ==
=== Regular season and playoffs ===
			Regular season					Playoffs
Season	Team	League	GP	G	A	Pts	PIM	GP	G	A	Pts	PIM
1992–93	Kamloops Blazers	WHL	4	0	0	0	2	—	—	—	—	—
1993–94	Kamloops Blazers	WHL	59	14	15	29	80	18	2	3	5	4
1994–95	Kamloops Blazers	WHL	71	9	32	41	65	21	2	7	9	9
1995–96	Kamloops Blazers	WHL	63	24	33	57	98	16	4	9	13	22
1996–97	Kentucky Thoroughblades	AHL	72	14	25	39	46	4	0	2	2	0
1996–97	New York Islanders	NHL	4	1	0	1	0	—	—	—	—	—
1997–98	Kentucky Thoroughblades	AHL	50	10	16	26	29	—	—	—	—	—
1997–98	New York Islanders	NHL	8	0	0	0	4	—	—	—	—	—
1997–98	Rochester Americans	AHL	9	0	4	4	10	4	0	3	3	4
1998–99	Rochester Americans	AHL	74	4	25	29	36	20	2	5	7	8
1998–99	Buffalo Sabres	NHL	3	0	0	0	8	—	—	—	—	—
1999–00	Rochester Americans	AHL	54	3	15	18	24	12	1	0	1	2
1999–00	Buffalo Sabres	NHL	9	0	1	1	0	1	0	0	0	0
2000–01	Rochester Americans	AHL	63	4	19	23	45	4	1	0	1	0
2001–02	Manchester Monarchs	AHL	65	9	18	27	39	5	1	0	1	5
2001–02	Los Angeles Kings	NHL	3	0	0	0	0	—	—	—	—	—
2002–03	Manchester Monarchs	AHL	67	4	27	31	53	3	0	0	0	0
2002–03	Los Angeles Kings	NHL	2	0	1	1	0	—	—	—	—	—
2003–04	Los Angeles Kings	NHL	52	3	3	6	24	—	—	—	—	—
2004–05	HC Alleghe	ITL	13	3	4	7	6	—	—	—	—	—
2004–05	Manchester Monarchs	AHL	53	1	9	10	64	6	1	1	2	0
2005–06	ERC Ingolstadt	DEL	50	10	18	28	56	7	1	3	4	6
2006–07	ERC Ingolstadt	DEL	48	12	19	31	96	6	0	3	3	22
2007–08	ERC Ingolstadt	DEL	55	5	17	22	91	3	0	4	4	8
2008–09	ERC Ingolstadt	DEL	51	6	19	25	80	—	—	—	—	—
2009–10	DEG Metro Stars	DEL	56	1	11	12	40	3	0	1	1	4
2010–11	DEG Metro Stars	DEL	51	8	19	27	34	9	2	2	4	6
2011–12	DEG Metro Stars	DEL	52	5	15	20	63	7	0	2	2	18
2012–13	Fort Saskatchewan Chiefs	ChHL	—	—	—	—	—	3	0	2	2	4
NHL totals			81	4	5	9	36	1	0	0	0	0

Medal record

Representing Canada

Ice hockey

World Junior Championships
Gold medal – first place	1996 Massachusetts	

=== International ===
Year	Team	Event	Result	GP	G	A	Pts	PIM
1996	Canada	WJC	1st place, gold medalist(s)	6	2	1	3	4
2008	Germany	WC	10th	2	0	1	1	2
Junior totals				6	2	1	3	4
Senior totals				2	0	1	1	2

== Awards and honours ==
Award	Year
AMHL
Warwick Trophy (MVP)	1993
Top Defenseman	1993
WHL
Memorial Cup (Kamloops Blazers)	1994, 1995
West First All-Star Team	1996
CHL Second All-Star Team	1996
AHL
All-Star Game	1997, 2001
DEL
All-Star Game	2007
