= 1995 Memorial Cup =

Canadian junior men's ice hockey championship

1995 Chrysler Memorial Cup
Tournament details
- Venue(s): Riverside Coliseum; Kamloops, British Columbia
- Dates: May 13–21, 1995
- Teams: 4
- Host team: Kamloops Blazers (WHL)
- TV partner(s): TSN

Final positions
- Champions: Kamloops Blazers (WHL) (3rd title)

Tournament statistics
- Games played: 8

The Memorial Cup trophy

The 1995 Memorial Cup occurred May 13–21 at the Riverside Coliseum in Kamloops, British Columbia. It was the 77th annual Memorial Cup competition and determined the major junior ice hockey champion of the Canadian Hockey League (CHL). Participating teams were the host Kamloops Blazers, who were also the champions of the Western Hockey League, as well as the WHL runner-up Brandon Wheat Kings, and the winners of the Quebec Major Junior Hockey League and Ontario Hockey League, which were the Hull Olympiques and the Detroit Jr. Red Wings. Kamloops won their second straight Memorial Cup, over Detroit.

== Round-robin standings ==
Pos	Team	Pld	W	L	GF	GA	
1	Kamloops Blazers (WHL and host)	3	3	0	15	9	Advanced directly to the championship game
2	Detroit Junior Red Wings (OHL)	3	2	1	13	10	Advanced to the semifinal game
3	Brandon Wheat Kings (WHL rep)	3	1	2	16	12	Advanced to the semifinal game
4	Hull Olympiques (QMJHL)	3	0	3	5	18	

== Teams ==
QMJHL Team OHL Team WHL Team Host Team

== Scores ==
Round-robin

- May 13 Brandon 9-2 Hull
- May 14 Detroit 4-3 Brandon
- May 14 Kamloops 4-1 Hull
- May 16 Kamloops 5-4 Detroit
- May 17 Detroit 5-2 Hull
- May 18 Kamloops 6-4 Brandon

Semi-final

- May 20 Detroit 2-1 Brandon

Final

- May 21 Kamloops 8-2 Detroit

=== Winning roster ===
1994-95 Kamloops Blazers
Goaltenders: – Rod Branch; – Randy Petruk	Defencemen: – Nolan Baumgartner; – Jason Holland; – Aaron Keller; – Brad Lukowich; – Keith McCambridge; – Jeff Oldenborger; – Jason Strudwick	Wingers: – Jeff Ainsworth; – Ashley Buckberger; – Shane Doan; – Hnat Domenichelli; – Greg Hart; – Ryan Huska; – Jarome Iginla; – Tyson Nash; – Darcy Tucker; – Ivan Vologjaninov; – Bob Westerby	Centres: – Jeff Antonovich; – Donnie Kinney; – Bob Maudie; – Shawn McNeil; Coach: Don Hay; General Manager: Bob Brown

== Award winners ==
- Stafford Smythe Memorial Trophy (MVP): Shane Doan, Kamloops
- George Parsons Trophy (Sportsmanship): Jarome Iginla, Kamloops
- Hap Emms Memorial Trophy (Goaltender): Jason Saal, Detroit

All-star team

- Goal: Jason Saal, Detroit
- Defence: Nolan Baumgartner, Kamloops; Bryan McCabe, Brandon
- Centre: Darcy Tucker, Kamloops
- Left wing: Sean Haggerty, Detroit
- Right wing: Shane Doan, Kamloops
