= Martin Brochu =

Canadian ice hockey player

- Born: March 10, 1973 (age 52) Anjou, Quebec, Canada
- Height: 6 ft 0 in (183 cm)
- Weight: 199 lb (90 kg; 14 st 3 lb)
- Position: Goaltender
- Caught: Left
- Played for: Washington Capitals; Vancouver Canucks; Pittsburgh Penguins
- NHL draft: Undrafted
- Playing career: 1998–2004

Martin Brochu (born March 10, 1973) is a Canadian former professional ice hockey goaltender who played briefly in the National Hockey League with the Washington Capitals, Vancouver Canucks, and Pittsburgh Penguins. He went winless in his nine-game NHL career.

As a youth, Brochu played in the 1985 Quebec International Pee-Wee Hockey Tournament with a minor ice hockey team from Pointe-aux-Trembles.

== Career statistics ==
=== Regular season and playoffs ===
			Regular season									Playoffs
Season	Team	League	GP	W	L	T	MIN	GA	SO	GAA	SV%	GP	W	L	MIN	GA	SO	GAA	SV%
1989–90	Montreal-Bourassa	QAAA	27	11	14	1	1471	103	3	4.20	—	3	1	2	193	10	1	3.10	—
1990–91	Granby Bisons	QMJHL	16	6	5	0	622	39	1	3.76	—	—	—	—	—	—	—	—	—
1991–92	Granby Bisons	QMJHL	52	15	29	2	2772	278	0	4.72	—	—	—	—	—	—	—	—	—
1992–93	Hull Olympiques	QMJHL	29	9	15	1	1453	137	0	5.66	—	2	0	1	69	7	0	6.07	—
1993–94	Fredericton Canadiens	AHL	32	10	11	3	1505	76	2	3.03	.904	—	—	—	—	—	—	—	—
1994–95	Fredericton Canadiens	AHL	44	18	18	4	2475	145	0	3.52	.894	—	—	—	—	—	—	—	—
1995–96	Wheeling Thunderbirds	ECHL	19	10	6	2	1060	51	1	2.89	.903	—	—	—	—	—	—	—	—
1995–96	Fredericton Canadiens	AHL	17	6	8	2	986	70	0	4.26	.880	—	—	—	—	—	—	—	—
1995–96	Portland Pirates	AHL	5	2	2	1	287	15	0	3.14	.915	12	7	4	700	28	2	2.40	—
1996–97	Portland Pirates	AHL	55	23	17	7	2962	150	2	3.04	.903	5	2	3	324	13	0	2.41	—
1997–98	Portland Pirates	AHL	37	16	14	1	1926	96	2	2.99	.909	6	3	2	296	16	0	3.24	—
1998–99	Washington Capitals	NHL	2	0	2	0	120	6	0	3.00	.891	—	—	—	—	—	—	—	—
1998–99	Portland Pirates	AHL	20	6	10	3	1164	57	2	2.94	.917	—	—	—	—	—	—	—	—
1998–99	Utah Grizzlies	IHL	5	1	3	1	298	13	0	2.62	.910	—	—	—	—	—	—	—	—
1999–00	Portland Pirates	AHL	54	32	15	6	3192	116	4	2.18	.925	2	0	2	80	7	0	5.25	.837
2000–01	Saint John Flames	AHL	55	27	19	5	3049	132	2	2.60	.899	19	14	4	1148	39	4	2.04	.918
2001–02	Vancouver Canucks	NHL	6	0	3	0	216	15	0	4.16	.856	—	—	—	—	—	—	—	—
2001–02	Manitoba Moose	AHL	29	10	14	3	1625	91	1	3.36	.882	—	—	—	—	—	—	—	—
2002–03	Verdun Dragons	QSPHL	1	1	0	0	60	2	0	2.00	—	—	—	—	—	—	—	—	—
2002–03	Cherepovets Severstal	Russia	8	—	—	—	480	15	2	1.88	—	—	—	—	—	—	—	—	—
2003–04	Wilkes-Barre/Scranton Penguins	AHL	15	4	9	1	731	31	1	2.54	.906	—	—	—	—	—	—	—	—
2003–04	Wheeling Nailers	ECHL	9	6	2	1	521	23	1	2.65	.900	—	—	—	—	—	—	—	—
2003–04	Pittsburgh Penguins	NHL	1	0	0	0	33	1	0	1.82	.947	—	—	—	—	—	—	—	—
NHL totals			9	0	5	0	369	22	0	3.58	.876	—	—	—	—	—	—	—	—
AHL totals			363	154	137	36	19,902	979	16	2.95	.904	44	26	15	2548	103	6	2.43	—

Awards and achievements
Preceded by Martin Biron	Aldege "Baz" Bastien Memorial Award; 1999–00	Succeeded by Dwayne Roloson
