= Martin Gendron =

Canadian ice hockey player (born 1974)

- Born: February 15, 1974 (age 52) Salaberry-de-Valleyfield, Quebec, Canada
- Height: 5 ft 9 in (175 cm)
- Weight: 176 lb (80 kg; 12 st 8 lb)
- Position: Right wing
- Shot: Right
- Played for: Washington Capitals; Chicago Blackhawks; Frankfurt Lions; Asiago; HC Bolzano
- National team: Canada
- NHL draft: 71st overall, 1992; Washington Capitals
- Playing career: 1994–2008

Martin Gendron (born February 15, 1974) is a Canadian former professional ice hockey forward. He played 30 games in the National Hockey League with the Washington Capitals and Chicago Blackhawks between 1995 and 1997. The rest of his career, which lasted from 1993 to 2008, was spent in the minor leagues and then in Europe.

== Biography ==
Gendron was born in Salaberry-de-Valleyfield, Quebec. As a youth, he played in the 1988 Quebec International Pee-Wee Hockey Tournament with a minor ice hockey team from Salaberry-de-Valleyfield.

Drafted in 1992 by the Washington Capitals, he spent about four seasons in the Capitals system before he was traded to the Chicago Blackhawks. Unable to break into the lineup in Chicago, Gendron remained in the minors until he left to play in Europe in 2000.

Gendron was the top goal scorer in the 1994 World Junior Ice Hockey Championships.

Gendron was the top goalscorer in the Swiss League during the 2002–03 and 2003–2004 seasons.

== Career statistics ==
=== Regular season and playoffs ===
			Regular season					Playoffs
Season	Team	League	GP	G	A	Pts	PIM	GP	G	A	Pts	PIM
1989–90	Lac St-Louis Lions	QMAAA	42	42	32	74	26	2	3	1	4	0
1990–91	Saint-Hyacinthe Laser	QMJHL	55	34	23	57	33	4	1	2	3	0
1991–92	Saint-Hyacinthe Laser	QMJHL	69	71	66	137	47	6	7	4	11	14
1992–93	Saint-Hyacinthe Laser	QMJHL	63	73	61	134	44	—	—	—	—	—
1992–93	Baltimore Skipjacks	AHL	10	1	2	3	2	3	0	0	0	0
1993–94	Hull Olympiques	QMJHL	37	39	7	46	20	20	21	17	38	8
1993–94	Canadian National Team	Intl	19	4	5	9	2	—	—	—	—	—
1994–95	Washington Capitals	NHL	8	2	1	3	2	—	—	—	—	—
1994–95	Portland Pirates	AHL	72	36	32	68	54	4	5	1	6	2
1995–96	Washington Capitals	NHL	20	2	1	3	8	—	—	—	—	—
1995–96	Portland Pirates	AHL	48	38	29	67	39	22	15	18	33	8
1996–97	Las Vegas Thunder	IHL	81	51	39	90	20	3	2	1	3	0
1997–98	Chicago Blackhawks	NHL	2	0	0	0	0	—	—	—	—	—
1997–98	Indianapolis Ice	IHL	17	8	6	14	16	—	—	—	—	—
1997–98	Milwaukee Admirals	IHL	40	20	19	39	14	—	—	—	—	—
1997–98	Fredericton Canadiens	AHL	10	5	10	15	4	2	0	0	0	4
1998–99	Fredericton Canadiens	AHL	65	33	34	67	26	15	12	5	17	2
1999–00	Syracuse Crunch	AHL	64	19	17	36	16	—	—	—	—	—
1999–00	Springfield Falcons	AHL	14	6	10	16	6	4	0	2	2	4
2000–01	Frankfurt Lions	DEL	60	23	20	43	30	—	—	—	—	—
2001–02	Asiago	ITA	38	27	35	62	2	3	1	1	2	0
2002–03	EHC Olten	NLB	38	43	28	71	44	5	2	6	8	6
2003–04	EHC Olten	NLB	45	39	27	66	26	—	—	—	—	—
2004–05	EHC Olten	NLB	42	30	24	54	26	—	—	—	—	—
2005–06	HC Ajoie	NLB	38	25	30	55	38	—	—	—	—	—
2005–06	EHC Chur	NLB	—	—	—	—	—	5	2	0	2	4
2005–06	HC Bolzano	ITA	6	2	1	3	2	—	—	—	—	—
2006–07	Top Design de Saint-Hyacinthe	LNAH	31	11	20	31	6	—	—	—	—	—
2007–08	EHC Chur	NLB	19	12	11	23	36	—	—	—	—	—
2007–08	Caron & Guay de Trois-Rivières	LNAH	15	7	17	24	2	13	5	7	12	10
AHL totals			283	138	134	272	147	50	32	26	58	20
NHL totals			30	4	2	6	10	—	—	—	—	—

=== International ===
Year	Team	Event	GP	G	A	Pts	PIM
1993	Canada	WJC	7	5	2	7	2
1994	Canada	WJC	7	6	4	10	6
Junior totals			14	11	6	17	8
