= Steve Brûlé =

Canadian ice hockey player (born 1975)

- Born: January 15, 1975 (age 51) Montreal, Quebec, Canada
- Height: 6 ft 0 in (183 cm)
- Weight: 205 lb (93 kg; 14 st 9 lb)
- Position: Right Wing
- Shot: Right
- Played for: New Jersey Devils; Colorado Avalanche
- NHL draft: 143rd overall, 1993; New Jersey Devils
- Playing career: 1995–2013

Steve Brûlé (born January 15, 1975) is a Canadian former professional ice hockey player. He last played competitively with Jonquière Marquis of the Ligue Nord-Américaine de Hockey. He played in the National Hockey League with the New Jersey Devils and Colorado Avalanche.

== Playing career ==
As a youth, Brûlé played in the 1988 Quebec International Pee-Wee Hockey Tournament with a minor ice hockey team from Montreal.

Brûlé was drafted 143rd overall in the 1993 NHL entry draft by the New Jersey Devils. He was drafted from St. Jean Lynx of the QMJHL where he was a prolific scorer as a junior, winning the Michel Bergeron Trophy in 1992–93. Brûlé made his professional debut at the end of the 1994–95 season with Devils affiliate, the Albany River Rats of the AHL, helping the Rats capture the Calder Cup with 14 points in 14 playoff games.

Brûlé spent the next five years with the River Rats, where he was a dependable scoring force. At the end of the 1999–2000 season with the River Rats, Brûlé was among a handful of players that made up their taxi squad of the Devils in case of injury or slump. During game 3 of the Eastern Conference Finals against the Philadelphia Flyers, Brûlé made his NHL debut in place of an injured John Madden, playing on a line with Jay Pandolfo and Claude Lemieux. When the Devils defeated the defending champion Dallas Stars in the 2000 Stanley Cup Finals, Brûlé, without yet playing a regular season game in his career, had his name engraved on the Stanley Cup.

Brûlé then signed with the Detroit Red Wings on July 20, 2000, and failing to make the team was assigned to the Manitoba Moose of the IHL. Brûlé then spent the 2001–02 season with the Cincinnati Mighty Ducks of the AHL before he signed with the Colorado Avalanche on July 22, 2002. Steve made the Avalanche's opening night roster for the 2002–03 season and made his NHL regular season debut, but was subsequently sent to affiliate the Hershey Bears.

Brûlé re-signed with the Avalanche on August 26, 2003, but again spent the year with the Bears, placing 2nd on the team in points with 58. During the 2004 NHL Lockout Brûlé left for Europe signing with German team Krefeld Pinguine of the DEL on July 22, 2004. After the Lockout Brûlé opted to stay in Europe spending time in the Austrian, and Swiss leagues.

After seven years abroad on June 23, 2011, Brûlé signed a one-year contract returning to play in Canada with the Saguenay Marquis of the LNAH.

== Career statistics ==
=== Regular season and playoffs ===
			Regular season					Playoffs
Season	Team	League	GP	G	A	Pts	PIM	GP	G	A	Pts	PIM
1992–93	St. Jean Lynx	QMJHL	70	33	47	80	46	4	0	0	0	9
1993–94	St. Jean Lynx	QMJHL	66	41	64	105	46	5	2	1	3	0
1994–95	St. Jean Lynx	QMJHL	69	44	64	108	42	7	3	4	7	8
1994–95	Albany River Rats	AHL	3	1	4	5	0	14	9	5	14	4
1995–96	Albany River Rats	AHL	80	30	21	51	37	4	0	0	0	17
1996–97	Albany River Rats	AHL	79	28	49	77	27	16	7	7	14	12
1997–98	Albany River Rats	AHL	80	34	43	77	34	13	8	3	11	4
1998–99	Albany River Rats	AHL	78	32	52	84	35	5	3	1	4	4
1999–00	Albany River Rats	AHL	75	30	46	76	18	5	1	2	3	0
1999–00	New Jersey Devils	NHL	—	—	—	—	—	1	0	0	0	0
2000–01	Manitoba Moose	IHL	78	21	48	69	22	13	3	10	13	12
2001–02	Cincinnati Mighty Ducks	AHL	77	21	42	63	50	3	0	1	1	0
2002–03	Colorado Avalanche	NHL	2	0	0	0	0	—	—	—	—	—
2002–03	Hershey Bears	AHL	49	18	19	37	30	5	4	0	4	8
2003–04	Hershey Bears	AHL	79	29	29	58	82	—	—	—	—	—
2004–05	Krefeld Pinguine	DEL	51	18	29	47	51	—	—	—	—	—
2005–06	EV Duisburg	DEL	31	8	15	23	36	—	—	—	—	—
2005–06	Kassel Huskies	DEL	18	2	4	6	22	—	—	—	—	—
2006–07	Graz 99ers	EBEL	38	20	27	47	59	—	—	—	—	—
2007–08	EHC Chur	NLB	31	26	24	50	96	—	—	—	—	—
2008–09	EHC Visp	NLB	40	29	37	66	85	9	3	12	15	8
2009–10	HC Thurgau	NLB	42	24	37	61	20	—	—	—	—	—
2010–11	HC Thurgau	NLB	33	20	16	36	10	—	—	—	—	—
2010–11	EHC Visp	NLB	12	5	13	18	8	17	6	6	12	8
2011–12	Saguenay Marquis	LNAH	46	29	41	70	4	6	2	5	7	6
2012–13	Jonquière Marquis	LNAH	38	14	26	40	32	11	5	7	12	0
AHL totals			600	223	304	527	313	65	32	19	51	49
NHL totals			2	0	0	0	0	1	0	0	0	0

== Awards and achievements ==
Award	Year
QMJHL
All-Rookie Team	1993
Michel Bergeron Trophy	1993
Second All-Star Team	1995
AHL
Calder Cup (Albany River Rats)	1995
NHL
Stanley Cup (New Jersey Devils)	2000
NLB
Champion (EHC Visp)	2011
