= Manny Fernandez (ice hockey) =

Canadian ice hockey player

- Born: August 27, 1974 (age 51) Etobicoke, Ontario, Canada
- Height: 6 ft 0 in (183 cm)
- Weight: 207 lb (94 kg; 14 st 11 lb)
- Position: Goaltender
- Caught: Left
- Played for: Dallas Stars; Minnesota Wild; Luleå HF; Boston Bruins
- NHL draft: 52nd overall, 1992; Quebec Nordiques
- Playing career: 1994–2009

Emmanuel L. Fernandez (born August 27, 1974) is a Canadian former professional ice hockey goaltender who played in the National Hockey League (NHL) with the Dallas Stars, Minnesota Wild and the Boston Bruins. Fernandez was born in Etobicoke, Ontario, but grew up in Kirkland, Quebec.

== Playing career ==
Fernandez was drafted in the third round, 52nd overall, of the 1992 NHL entry draft by the Quebec Nordiques. Before playing in the NHL, he was traded to the Dallas Stars in 1994 for Tommy Sjödin and a third-round pick.

In June 2000, Fernandez was traded with Brad Lukowich to the Minnesota Wild for two draft picks, a 2000 third-round pick and a 2002 fourth-round pick.

During the 2002–03 NHL season, Fernandez shared netminding duties with Dwayne Roloson as the Wild made their first appearance in the postseason, defeating the Colorado Avalanche in the first round and the Vancouver Canucks in the second before falling to the Mighty Ducks of Anaheim in the NHL Western Conference final.

During the 2004–05 NHL lockout, Fernandez played for Luleå HF of Sweden's Elitserien.

In his earlier years, Fernandez was often criticized for having confidence and discipline issues and being inconsistent. In a 2006 interview, Fernandez credited his improvement to gaining maturity, becoming the Wild's number one goaltender after the departure of Dwayne Roloson, and a switch to the butterfly style of goaltending.

On June 30, 2007, Fernandez was traded to the Boston Bruins for forward Petr Kalus and a 2009 fourth-round pick. An injury plagued 2007–08 NHL season saw Fernandez play in only four games for the Bruins, recording a 2–2 record. However, during the 2008–09 NHL season, Fernandez and fellow Bruins goaltender Tim Thomas formed a goaltending duo, which earned them the William M. Jennings Trophy as the goaltenders playing for the team with the fewest allowed goals (196). Fernandez had a 16–8–3 record with a 2.59 goals against average (GAA).

Fernandez's contract with Boston expired after the 2008–09 season. With the Bruins preferring to proceed with Thomas and Tuukka Rask as their goaltenders, Fernandez became a free agent, but unsigned by any other team, retired from active play, although he made no formal retirement announcement.

== Personal life ==
Fernandez is the nephew of former NHL head coach and Hall of Famer Jacques Lemaire, whom Fernandez played for from 2001 to 2007.

== Career statistics ==
=== Regular season and playoffs ===
			Regular season										Playoffs
Season	Team	League	GP	W	L	T	OTL	MIN	GA	SO	GAA	SV%	GP	W	L	MIN	GA	SO	GAA	SV%
1990–91	Lac St-Louis Lions	QMAAA	20	13	5	0	—	1,176	69	3	3.52	—	—	—	—	—	—	—	—	—
1991–92	Laval Titan	QMJHL	31	14	13	2	—	1,593	99	1	3.73	.881	9	3	5	468	39	0	5.00	.877
1992–93	Laval Titan	QMJHL	43	26	14	2	—	2,347	141	1	3.60	.887	13	12	1	818	42	0	3.05	.909
1992–93	Laval Titan	MC	—	—	—	—	—	—	—	—	—	—	5	2	3	300	17	0	3.40	—
1993–94	Laval Titan	QMJHL	51	29	14	1	—	2,776	143	5	4.44	.905	19	14	5	1,116	49	1	2.60	.914
1993–94	Laval Titan	MC	—	—	—	—	—	—	—	—	—	—	5	2	3	304	17	0	3.36	—
1994–95	Kalamazoo Wings	IHL	46	21	10	9	—	2,470	115	2	2.79	.905	14	10	2	753	34	1	2.54	.902
1994–95	Dallas Stars	NHL	1	0	1	0	—	59	3	0	3.05	.889	—	—	—	—	—	—	—	—
1995–96	Michigan K-Wings	IHL	47	22	15	9	—	2,664	133	4	3.00	.906	6	5	1	372	14	0	2.26	.928
1995–96	Dallas Stars	NHL	5	0	1	1	—	249	19	0	4.58	.843	—	—	—	—	—	—	—	—
1996–97	Michigan K-Wings	IHL	48	20	24	2	—	2,720	142	2	3.13	.904	4	1	3	277	15	0	3.25	.919
1997–98	Michigan K-Wings	IHL	55	27	17	5	—	3,022	139	5	2.76	.916	2	0	2	88	7	0	4.73	.860
1997–98	Dallas Stars	NHL	2	1	0	0	—	69	2	0	1.74	.943	1	0	0	2	0	0	0.00	1.000
1998–99	Dallas Stars	NHL	1	0	1	0	—	60	2	0	2.00	.931	—	—	—	—	—	—	—	—
1998–99	Houston Aeros	IHL	50	34	6	9	—	2,949	116	2	2.36	.916	19	11	8	1,126	49	1	2.61	.904
1999–00	Dallas Stars	NHL	24	11	8	3	—	1,353	48	1	2.13	.920	1	0	0	17	1	0	3.54	.875
2000–01	Minnesota Wild	NHL	42	19	17	4	—	2,461	92	4	2.24	.920	—	—	—	—	—	—	—	—
2001–02	Minnesota Wild	NHL	44	12	24	5	—	2,463	125	1	3.05	.892	—	—	—	—	—	—	—	—
2002–03	Minnesota Wild	NHL	35	19	13	2	—	1,979	74	2	2.24	.924	9	3	4	552	18	0	1.96	.929
2003–04	Minnesota Wild	NHL	37	11	14	9	—	2,166	90	2	2.49	.915	—	—	—	—	—	—	—	—
2004–05	Luleå HF	SEL	19	—	—	—	—	1,083	50	2	2.77	.895	3	—	—	159	13	0	4.90	.849
2005–06	Minnesota Wild	NHL	58	30	18	—	7	3,411	130	1	2.29	.919	—	—	—	—	—	—	—	—
2006–07	Minnesota Wild	NHL	44	22	16	—	1	2,422	103	2	2.55	.911	—	—	—	—	—	—	—	—
2007–08	Boston Bruins	NHL	4	2	2	—	0	244	16	1	3.93	.832	—	—	—	—	—	—	—	—
2008–09	Boston Bruins	NHL	28	16	8	—	3	1,644	71	1	2.59	.910	—	—	—	—	—	—	—	—
NHL totals			325	143	123	24	11	18,580	775	15	2.50	.912	11	3	4	571	19	0	2.00	.927

=== International ===
Year	Team	Event	GP	W	L	T	MIN	GA	SO	GAA	SV%
1994	Canada	WJC	3	3	0	0	180	10	0	3.33	.877

== See also ==
- Notable families in the NHL

Awards and achievements
Preceded by Miikka Kiprusoff; Chris Osgood, Dominik Hašek	Winner of the William M. Jennings Trophy; 2007 (with Niklas Bäckström); 2009 (with Tim Thomas)	Succeeded by Chris Osgood, Dominik Hašek; Martin Brodeur
