= Brad Lukowich =

Canadian ice hockey player

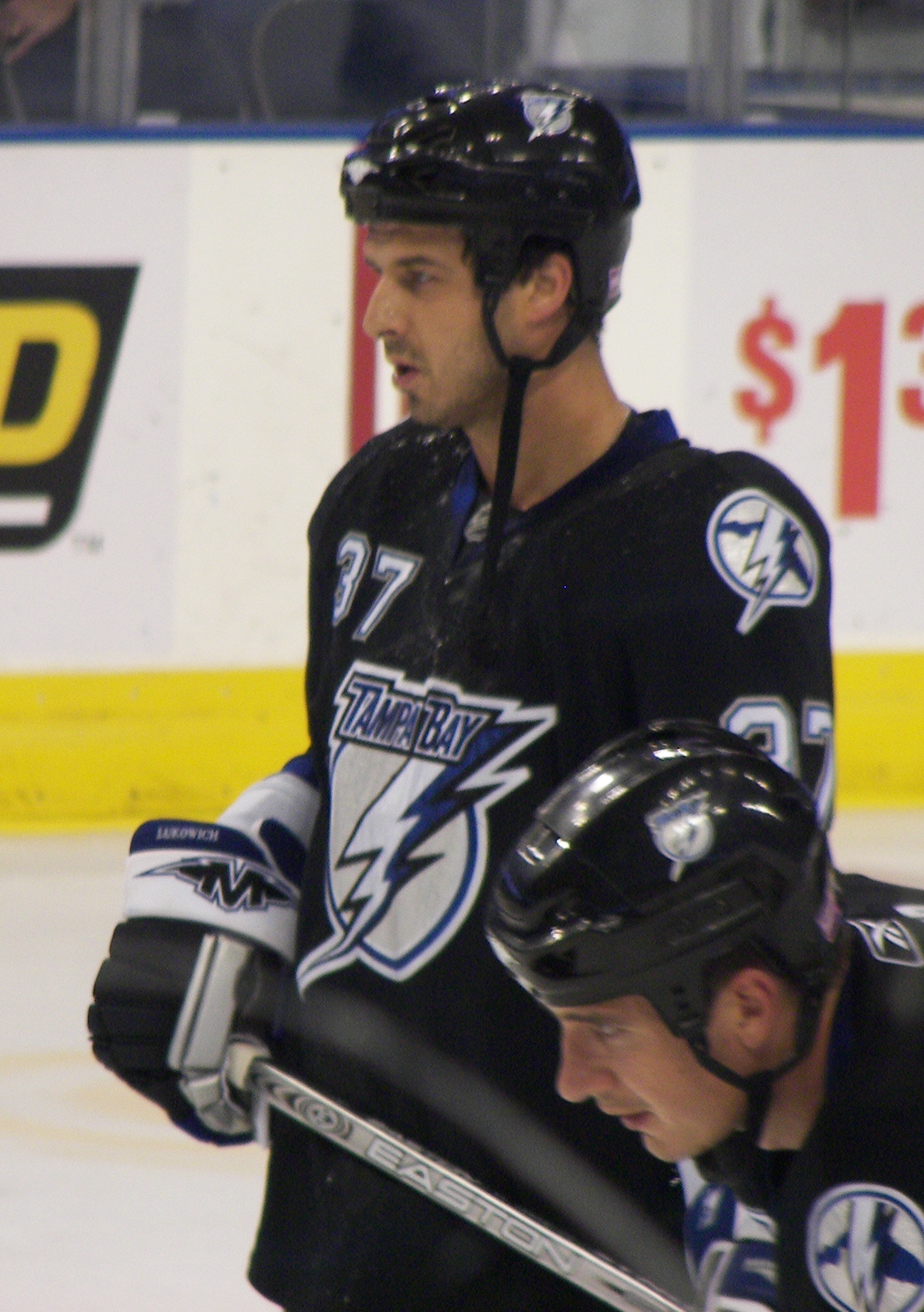
- Lukowich with the Tampa Bay Lightning in 2007
- Born: August 12, 1976 (age 50) Cranbrook, British Columbia, Canada
- Height: 6 ft 1 in (185 cm)
- Weight: 205 lb (93 kg; 14 st 9 lb)
- Position: Defence
- Shot: Left
- Played for: Dallas Stars; Tampa Bay Lightning; New York Islanders; New Jersey Devils; San Jose Sharks; Vancouver Canucks
- NHL draft: 90th overall, 1994; New York Islanders
- Playing career: 1996–2012

Bradley J. Lukowich (born August 12, 1976) is a Canadian former professional ice hockey defenceman and former assistant coach of the Lethbridge Hurricanes of the Western Hockey League. He has won the Stanley Cup twice in his career, with the Dallas Stars in 1999 and Tampa Bay Lightning in 2004. He was on the roster of the Stars when they won the cup in 1998–99, but did not play enough games to get his name on the Cup. He is currently coaching hockey.

== Playing career ==
Lukowich played major junior in the Western Hockey League (WHL) with the Kamloops Blazers for three seasons. On December 5, 1993, he scored the goal in the first recorded teddy bear toss that prompted fans to throw a few hundred bears onto the ice. With Kamloops, Lukowich won back-to-back Memorial Cup championships in 1994 and 1995. Following his rookie season with the Blazers, he was selected in the fourth round, 90th overall, by the New York Islanders in the 1994 NHL entry draft.

After graduating from junior, Lukowich was traded from the Islanders to the Dallas Stars for a third round pick in the 1997 NHL entry draft on June 1, 1996. He played in the Stars' system with the Michigan K-Wings of the International Hockey League (IHL) in his first three professional seasons, earning NHL call-ups with the Stars in 1997–98 and 1998–99. Lukowich participated in the Stars' 1999 Stanley Cup championship win, appearing in eight games during the playoffs, but did not qualify to have his name added to the Cup. In 1999–2000, he remained with the Stars full-time and recorded four points over 60 games in his NHL rookie season, averaging nearly 12 minutes of ice time.

In the off-season, on June 12, 2000, he was traded along with goaltender Manny Fernandez to the Minnesota Wild for a third round pick in the 2000 NHL entry draft (Joel Lundqvist) and a fourth round pick in the 2002 NHL entry draft (Aaron Rome). However, just under two weeks later, on June 25, 2000, he was traded back to the Stars, along with third and ninth round picks in the 2001 NHL entry draft for Aaron Gavey, Pavel Patera and Dallas' eighth round pick in the 2000 draft (Eric Johansson). In his second full season with the Stars, he improved to 14 points.

On June 22, 2002, Lukowich was traded with Dallas' seventh round pick in the 2003 NHL entry draft (Jay Rosehill) to the Tampa Bay Lightning for Tampa Bay's second round pick in the 2002 NHL entry draft (Tobias Stephan). Following a five-goal, 19-point season in 2003–04, Lukowich earned his second Stanley Cup championship, helping the Lightning to their first title with a seven-game victory over the Calgary Flames in the Final.

Due to the 2004–05 NHL lockout, Lukowich signed as a free agent with the Fort Worth Brahmas of the Central Hockey League (CHL) on September 21, 2004. However, he played just 16 games with the minor-league team, notching eight points. With the NHL set to resume with the 2005–06 season, he became an unrestricted free agent and signed with the team that originally drafted him, the New York Islanders, on August 11, 2005. In his only season with the Islanders, he was dealt away at the trade deadline on March 9, 2006, to the New Jersey Devils for New Jersey's third round draft pick in the 2006 NHL entry draft (Jonas Ahnelov). He scored a combined career-high 21 points between the two teams. He completed a full season with the Devils in 2006–07, notching 12 points.

On July 3, 2007, Lukowich returned to the Lightning, signing as an unrestricted free agent. He scored a goal and seven points in his season back. The following off-season, on July 4, 2008, Lukowich was traded with defenceman Dan Boyle from the Tampa Bay Lightning to the San Jose Sharks in exchange for Matt Carle and Ty Wishart and San Jose's first round choice in the 2009 NHL entry draft and San Jose's fourth round choice in the 2010 NHL entry draft. Lukowich scored eight points in his only season with the Sharks before being traded once more, along with defenceman Christian Ehrhoff on August 28, 2009, to the Vancouver Canucks in exchange for prospects Daniel Rahimi and Patrick White.

With 10 defencemen on the Canucks with one-way contracts, however, Lukowich was assigned by the Canucks to the Texas Stars of the American Hockey League (AHL). He was recalled on January 1, 2010, due to an injury to defenceman Kevin Bieksa. He subsequently scored his first goal as a Canuck, as well as his first in 111 NHL games overall, on January 25, a game-winner in a 3–2 win against the Buffalo Sabres.

In June 2013, Lukowich signed a contract with the Western Hockey League's Lethbridge Hurricanes to become the team's assistant coach. He was dismissed in February 2014, which led to a wrongful dismissal suit launched in April. The suit was settled in August 2014, with the Hurricanes issuing a statement that Lukowich had not been fired with cause.

== Personal life ==
Lukowich and his wife Cara have two daughters. His father, Bernie Lukowich, played two seasons in the NHL with the St. Louis Blues and Pittsburgh Penguins, as well as 21 games with the Calgary Cowboys of the World Hockey Association (WHA), while his cousin Morris Lukowich played 582 games in the NHL and 228 games in the WHA.

Lukowich resides in the Dallas/Fort Worth Metroplex, where he is in charge of hockey programs at local StarCenter ice rinks.

== Career statistics ==
=== Regular season and playoffs ===
			Regular season					Playoffs
Season	Team	League	GP	G	A	Pts	PIM	GP	G	A	Pts	PIM
1992–93	Kamloops Blazers	WHL	1	0	0	0	0	—	—	—	—	—
1993–94	Kamloops Blazers	WHL	42	5	11	16	168	16	0	1	1	35
1994–95	Kamloops Blazers	WHL	63	10	35	45	125	18	0	7	7	21
1995–96	Kamloops Blazers	WHL	65	14	55	69	114	13	2	10	12	29
1996–97	Michigan K-Wings	IHL	69	2	6	8	77	4	0	1	1	2
1997–98	Michigan K-Wings	IHL	60	6	27	33	104	4	0	4	4	14
1997–98	Dallas Stars	NHL	4	0	1	1	2	—	—	—	—	—
1998–99	Michigan K-Wings	IHL	67	8	21	29	95	—	—	—	—	—
1998–99	Dallas Stars	NHL	14	1	2	3	19	8	0	1	1	4
1999–00	Dallas Stars	NHL	60	3	1	4	50	—	—	—	—	—
2000–01	Dallas Stars	NHL	80	4	10	14	76	10	1	0	1	4
2001–02	Dallas Stars	NHL	66	1	6	7	40	—	—	—	—	—
2002–03	Tampa Bay Lightning	NHL	70	1	14	15	46	9	0	1	1	2
2003–04	Tampa Bay Lightning	NHL	79	5	14	19	24	18	0	2	2	6
2004–05	Fort Worth Brahmas	CHL	16	3	5	8	33	—	—	—	—	—
2005–06	New York Islanders	NHL	57	1	12	13	32	—	—	—	—	—
2005–06	New Jersey Devils	NHL	18	1	7	8	8	9	0	0	0	4
2006–07	New Jersey Devils	NHL	75	4	8	12	36	11	0	1	1	2
2007–08	Tampa Bay Lightning	NHL	59	1	6	7	20	—	—	—	—	—
2008–09	San Jose Sharks	NHL	58	0	8	8	12	6	0	0	0	0
2009–10	Texas Stars	AHL	29	3	15	18	10	—	—	—	—	—
2009–10	Vancouver Canucks	NHL	13	1	1	2	4	—	—	—	—	—
2010–11	Texas Stars	AHL	67	4	23	27	59	6	1	0	1	2
2010–11	Dallas Stars	NHL	5	0	0	0	0	—	—	—	—	—
2011–12	Texas Stars	AHL	67	4	22	26	40	—	—	—	—	—
NHL totals			658	23	90	113	369	71	1	5	6	22

== Awards ==
- Won the Stanley Cup with the Dallas Stars in 1999 and the Tampa Bay Lightning in 2004.
