= Jean Sawyer Trophy =

- Description: Awarded annually to the top marketing director(s) in the Quebec Maritimes Junior Hockey League
- Country: Canada
- Presented by: Quebec Maritimes Junior Hockey League

The Jean Sawyer Trophy is awarded annually to the top marketing director(s) in the Quebec Maritimes Junior Hockey League. The trophy was previously known as the St-Clair Group Plaque from 1990 to 2002.

== Winners ==
Season	Recipient(s)	Team
St-Clair Group Plaque
1990–91	Gilles Cote	Hull Olympiques
1991–92	Michel Boisvert	Shawinigan Cataractes
1992–93	Stephane Tousignant	Drummondville Voltigeurs
1993–94	Michel Boisvert	Shawinigan Cataractes
1994–95	Yvon Rioux	Val-d'Or Foreurs
1995–96	Eric Forest	Rimouski Océanic
1996–97	Matt McKnight	Halifax Mooseheads
1997–98	Jeff Rose	Moncton Wildcats
1998–99	Matt McKnight	Halifax Mooseheads
1999–2000	Genevieve Lussier	Sherbrooke Castors
2000–01	Eric Forest	Rimouski Océanic
2001–02	Sylvie Fortier	Baie-Comeau Drakkar
Jean Sawyer Trophy
2002–03	Michel Boisvert	Shawinigan Cataractes
2003–04	Johanne Lefebvre	Baie-Comeau Drakkar
2004–05	Michel Boivin, & Pierre Cardinal	Chicoutimi Saguenéens
2005–06	Andre Gosselin & Stephane Rheaume	Drummondville Voltigeurs
2006–07	Nadia Lacasse & Melanie Allard	Rouyn-Noranda Huskies
2007–08	Yves Bonneau	Victoriaville Tigres
2008–09	Sylvie Fortier	Drummondville Voltigeurs
2009–10	Vicky Cote	Drummondville Voltigeurs
2010–11	Lucie Cloutier & Yves Cinq-Mars	Québec Remparts
2011–12	Travis Kennedy & Brian Urquhart	Halifax Mooseheads
2012–13	Serge Proulx	Baie-Comeau Drakkar
2013–14	Sherbrooke Phoenix	
2014–15	Saint John Sea Dogs	
2015–16	Québec Remparts	
2016–17	Saint John Sea Dogs	
2017–18	Halifax Mooseheads	
2018–19	Sherbrooke Phoenix	
2019–20	Drummondville Voltigeurs	
2020–21	John Horman Trophy not awarded	
2021–22	John Horman Trophy not awarded	
2022–23	Québec Remparts	
2023–24	Victoriaville Tigres	
2024–25	Québec Remparts	
2025–26	Chicoutimi Saguenéens	
