= Yanick Dubé =

Canadian ice hockey player

- Born: June 14, 1974 (age 51) Gaspé, Quebec, Canada
- Height: 5 ft 9 in (175 cm)
- Weight: 176 lb (80 kg; 12 st 8 lb)
- Position: Centre
- Shot: Right
- Played for: AHL; Syracuse Crunch; Prince Edward Island Senators; Cornwall Aces; Switzerland; HC Fribourg-Gottéron; EHC Olten; HC Sierre-Anniviers; HC La Chaux-de-Fonds; Germany; EC Bad Tölz; Essen Mosquitoes; EHC Freiburg; Augsburger Panther
- National team: Canada
- NHL draft: 117th overall, 1994; Vancouver Canucks
- Playing career: 1994–2014

Yanick Dubé (born June 14, 1974) is a Canadian former professional ice hockey player. During the 1993–94 season while playing with the Laval Titan of the Quebec Major Junior Hockey League (QMJHL), Dube scored 66 goals and 141 points in 64 games to lead the QMJHL in both goals and points. Dube was named to the QMJHL First All-Star Team, and was selected at the Canadian Hockey League's Sportsman of the Year. He was selected by the Vancouver Canucks in the 6th round (117th overall) of the 1994 NHL entry draft.

Dube began his playing career in Canada with the Laval Titan in the QMJHL. After a few years in the American Hockey League, Dube moved in 1997 to Switzerland. Subsequently, he moved first to Germany with EC Bad Tolz, and later back to Switzerland. In 2005, Dube went again back to Germany, and took on German nationality. Until 2009 he played with Bad Tolz, where he was considered a fan favourite. Dube signed for the 2009-10 season a contract with the Wolves Freiburg, and in September 2010, Dube signed again with EC Bad Tolz.

== International ==
At the 1994 World Junior Ice Hockey Championships, Dube tied for the team scoring lead with 10 points to win the gold medal with Team Canada. He went on to play 24 games with the Canada men's national ice hockey team during the 1994–95 season, including competing at the 1994 Deutschland Cup.

== Awards and honours ==
Award	Year
IIHF World U20 Championship – Gold Medal	1994
QMJHL Paul Dumont Trophy - Personality of the Year	1993–94
QMJHL Frank J. Selke Memorial Trophy - Most Sportsmanlike Player	1993–94
QMJHL Most Goals (66)	1993–94
QMJHL Jean Béliveau Trophy – Most Points (141)	1993–94
QMJHL Ford Cup Offensive Player of the Year	1993–94
QMJHL First Team All-Star	1993–94
CHL Second Team All-Star	1993–94
CHL Sportsman of the Year	1993–94
Memorial Cup Most Sportsmanlike Player	1994

== Career statistics ==
=== Regular season and playoffs ===
			Regular season					Playoffs
Season	Team	League	GP	G	A	Pts	PIM	GP	G	A	Pts	PIM
1989–90	Richelieu Riverains	QMAAA	42	15	22	37	4	—	—	—	—	—
1990–91	Richelieu Riverains	QMAAA	36	35	38	73	31	—	—	—	—	—
1991–92	Laval Titan	QMJHL	66	14	19	33	8	10	0	2	2	2
1992–93	Laval Titan	QMJHL	67	45	38	83	25	13	6	7	13	6
1992–93	Laval Titan	MC	—	—	—	—	—	5	4	0	4	4
1993–94	Laval Titan	QMJHL	64	66	75	141	30	21	12	18	30	8
1993–94	Laval Titan	MC	—	—	—	—	—	5	2	4	6	2
1994–95	Syracuse Crunch	AHL	39	10	11	21	40	—	—	—	—	—
1994–95	Laval Titan Collège Français	QMJHL	1	0	0	0	0	16	11	3	14	12
1995–96	P.E.I. Senators	AHL	4	0	1	1	0	—	—	—	—	—
1995–96	Cornwall Aces	AHL	61	17	20	37	10	3	0	1	1	0
1996–97	EHC Olten	CHE.2	41	44	31	75	36	—	—	—	—	—
1997–98	Genève–Servette HC	CHE.2	35	29	33	62	8	—	—	—	—	—
1998–99	EC Bad Tölz	DEU.2	37	27	31	58	6	12	7	16	23	0
1999–2000	EC Bad Tölz	DEU.2	45	33	46	79	24	3	1	2	3	2
2000–01	EC Bad Tölz	DEU.2	41	24	34	58	6	14	8	7	15	6
2001–02	EHC Olten	CHE.2	18	16	25	41	2	3	1	3	4	2
2002–03	Tölzer Löwen	DEU.2	46	18	34	52	37	—	—	—	—	—
2003–04	HC Sierre–Anniviers	CHE.2	1	1	0	1	0	—	—	—	—	—
2003–04	HC La Chaux–de–Fonds	CHE.2	37	30	33	63	16	—	—	—	—	—
2004–05	HC La Chaux–de–Fonds	CHE.2	44	27	39	66	8	4	2	1	3	0
2004–05	HC Fribourg–Gottéron	NLA	1	0	1	1	0	—	—	—	—	—
2005–06	Moskitos Essen	DEU.2	39	22	23	45	18	—	—	—	—	—
2006–07	Augsburger Panther	DEL	20	4	5	9	6	—	—	—	—	—
2006–07	Tölzer Löwen	DEU.3	24	16	28	44	8	—	—	—	—	—
2007–08	Tölzer Löwen	DEU.3	47	38	62	100	18	8	11	5	16	6
2008–09	Tölzer Löwen	DEU.2	26	13	19	32	16	—	—	—	—	—
2009–10	Wölfe Freiburg	DEU.2	10	0	6	6	4	—	—	—	—	—
2010–11	Tölzer Löwen	DEU.3	36	25	34	59	16	—	—	—	—	—
2011–12	Tölzer Löwen	DEU.3	37	22	32	54	6	15	9	8	17	0
2012–13	Tölzer Löwen	DEU.3	31	16	18	34	20	9	3	3	6	2
2013–14	Tölzer Löwen	DEU.3	35	14	22	36	26	10	3	6	9	4
CHE.2 totals			176	147	161	308	70	7	3	4	7	2
DEU.2 totals			244	137	193	330	111	29	16	25	41	8
DEU.3 totals			210	131	196	327	94	42	26	22	48	12

=== International ===
Year	Team	Event	GP	G	A	Pts	PIM
1994	Canada	WJC	7	5	5	10	10
Junior totals			7	5	5	10	10
