= Luc Beausoleil =

Canadian ice hockey player (born 1967)

- Born: October 8, 1967 (age 58) Montreal, Quebec, Canada
- Height: 5 ft 8 in (173 cm)
- Weight: 175 lb (79 kg; 12 st 7 lb)
- Position: Right wing
- Shot: Right
- Played for: BHL; Murrayfield Racers; Fife Flyers; Swindon Wildcats; CHL; Tulsa Oilers; WCHL; Reno Renegades; IHL; San Antonio Dragons; WPHL; Tupelo T-Rex
- Playing career: 1988–2001

Luc Beausoleil (born October 8, 1967) is a Canadian former professional ice hockey player.

== Junior career ==
Beausoleil played junior hockey in the Quebec Major Junior Hockey League (QMJHL) with the Laval Voisins and Laval Titan. He was awarded the 1986–87 Frank J. Selke Memorial Trophy as the QMJHL's Most Sportsmanlike Player and was named to the 1986–87 Second All-Star Team.

== Professional career ==
Beausoleil began his professional career in 1988 with the Murrayfield Racers of the British Hockey League (BHL). He also played in the BHL with the Fife Flyers and Swindon Wildcats, and in France, before returning to North America in 1992 to join the Tulsa Oilers of the new Central Hockey League (CHL). He went on to play seven seasons with Tulsa, playing 363 regular season games and 39 playoff games for the Oilers between 1992 and 2000. He led the Oilers to capture the inaugural 1992–93 Ray Miron President's Cup as the champion of the CHL, and during the 1997–98 CHL season he established the CHL record of 30 power play goals in a single season, and scored 127 points in 68 games played to win the Joe Burton Award as the CHL's top scorer. During the 1999-2000 season, he was named to the CHL All-Star Team's starting lineup. In 2003, the Oilers retired Beuasoleil's #17 in a ceremony before a game on February 19. At the time, he was the team's all-time leading scorer and ranked third in league history in total goals scored.

== Roller hockey ==
In 1997 Beausoleil played 20 games with the Ottawa Wheels in the Roller Hockey International league.

== Awards and honours ==
Award	Year
QMJHL Second Team All-Star	1986–87
Frank J. Selke Memorial Trophy	1986–87
Ray Miron President's Cup	1992–93
Joe Burton Award	1997–98
