= Christian Matte =

Canadian ice hockey player (born 1975)

- Born: January 20, 1975 (age 51) Hull, Quebec, Canada
- Height: 6 ft 0 in (183 cm)
- Weight: 190 lb (86 kg; 13 st 8 lb)
- Position: Right wing
- Shot: Right
- Played for: Colorado Avalanche; Minnesota Wild
- NHL draft: 153rd overall, 1993; Quebec Nordiques
- Playing career: 1994–2004

Christian Matte (born January 20, 1975) is a Canadian former professional ice hockey right winger who played briefly in the NHL with the Colorado Avalanche and Minnesota Wild.

== Playing career ==
As a youth, Matte played in the 1988 Quebec International Pee-Wee Hockey Tournament with the a minor ice hockey team from Hull, Quebec.

Matte first played competitive major junior hockey with Abitibi Forestiers in the Quebec QAAA before moving on the Granby Bisons in the QMJHL. In his first season in 1992–93 he complied 53 points in 68 games to be named in the QMJHL All-Rookie Team. Matte was consequently drafted by the Quebec Nordiques in the 6th round, 153rd overall in the 1993 NHL entry draft. After being drafted Matte reported back to the Bisons and played another two years with the team developing a strong scoring touch earning a place in the QMJHL Second All-Star team and scoring 50 goals and 116 points in 66 games his final year there. For the 1995–96 season Matte turned pro and joined the Cornwall Aces in the AHL. The following year the Nordiques relocated to Colorado and Matte joined the Hershey Bears who became the Avalanche's new minor league affiliate. That same season Matte also made his NHL debut and played in 5 games with the Avalanche.

Matte then played the majority of the next three years with the Bears. In the 1999–2000 season, his last within the Avalanche organization, Matte scored an impressive 104 points in 73 games with Hershey to be awarded the John B. Sollenberger Trophy as the AHL leading scorer. Despite averaging more than a point per game in the minors Matte was not able to crack the Avalanche lineup and never played more than 7 games in a season with the Avalanche. For the 2000–01 season Matte signed as a free agent with the newly formed Minnesota Wild where he would have a better chance of cracking the starting lineup. However, Matte played only three games with the Wild before being sent to the Cleveland Lumberjacks of the IHL for the remainder of the season, leading the IHL in scoring with 38 goals. The next year Matte signed with the Buffalo Sabres but never played a game with them, instead playing with their minor league affiliate Rochester Americans. From the 2002–03 season until the 2003–04 season Matte played in Switzerland before retiring.

== Career statistics ==
			Regular season					Playoffs
Season	Team	League	GP	G	A	Pts	PIM	GP	G	A	Pts	PIM
1992–93	Granby Bisons	QMJHL	68	17	36	53	56	—	—	—	—	—
1993–94	Granby Bisons	QMJHL	59	50	47	97	103	7	5	5	10	12
1993–94	Cornwall Aces	AHL	1	0	0	0	0	—	—	—	—	—
1994–95	Granby Bisons	QMJHL	66	50	66	116	86	13	11	7	18	12
1994–95	Cornwall Aces	AHL	—	—	—	—	—	3	0	1	1	2
1995–96	Cornwall Aces	AHL	64	20	32	52	51	7	1	1	2	6
1996–97	Hershey Bears	AHL	49	18	18	36	78	22	8	3	11	25
1996–97	Colorado Avalanche	NHL	5	1	1	2	0	—	—	—	—	—
1997–98	Hershey Bears	AHL	71	33	40	73	109	7	3	2	5	4
1997–98	Colorado Avalanche	NHL	5	0	0	0	6	—	—	—	—	—
1998–99	Colorado Avalanche	NHL	7	1	1	2	0	—	—	—	—	—
1998–99	Hershey Bears	AHL	60	31	47	78	48	5	2	1	3	8
1999–2000	Hershey Bears	AHL	73	43	61	104	85	14	8	6	14	10
1999–2000	Colorado Avalanche	NHL	5	0	1	1	4	—	—	—	—	—
2000–01	Cleveland Lumberjacks	IHL	58	38	29	67	59	4	1	1	2	0
2000–01	Minnesota Wild	NHL	3	0	0	0	2	—	—	—	—	—
2001–02	Rochester Americans	AHL	72	22	29	51	48	2	0	0	0	0
2002–03	ZSC Lions	NLA	44	22	25	47	49	12	5	3	8	14
2003–04	ZSC Lions	NLA	12	3	6	9	12	—	—	—	—	—
2003–04	GCK Lions	NLB	3	1	2	3	4	—	—	—	—	—
2003–04	HC Ambrì–Piotta	NLA	6	3	4	7	0	—	—	—	—	—
AHL totals			390	167	227	394	419	60	22	14	36	55
NHL totals			25	2	3	5	12	—	—	—	—	—

== Awards and honours ==
Award	Year
Junior
QMJHL All-Rookie Team	1992–93
QMJHL Second All-Star team	1993–94
American Hockey League
First All-Star Team	1999–00
John B. Sollenberger Trophy	1999–00
