= David Desharnais Trophy =

Annual award for sportsmanship in the Quebec Major Junior Hockey League

The David Desharnais Trophy is awarded annually to the most sportsmanlike player in the Quebec Maritimes Junior Hockey League since the 1970–71 season. It was originally given as a team trophy awarded to the league's West Division champions for the 1969–70 season, and known as the Frank J. Selke Memorial Trophy in recognition of National Hockey League general manager and Hockey Hall of Fame inductee Frank J. Selke. The award was renamed for David Desharnais prior to the 2024–25 season.

== Winners ==
Season	West Division champions	
1969–70	Saint-Jérôme Alouettes	
Season	Player	Team
1970–71	Norm Dubé	Sherbrooke Castors
1971–72	Gerry Teeple	Cornwall Royals
1972–73	Claude Larose	Drummondville Rangers
1973–74	Gary MacGregor	Cornwall Royals
1974–75	Jean-Luc Phaneuf	Montreal Bleu Blanc Rouge
1975–76	Norm Dupont	Montreal Juniors
1976–77	Mike Bossy	Laval National
1977–78	Kevin Reeves	Montreal Juniors
1978–79	Jean-François Sauvé	Trois-Rivieres Draveurs
1978–79	Ray Bourque	Verdun Éperviers
1979–80	Jean-François Sauvé	Trois-Rivieres Draveurs
1980–81	Claude Verret	Trois-Rivieres Draveurs
1981–82	Claude Verret	Trois-Rivieres Draveurs
1982–83	Pat LaFontaine	Verdun Juniors
1983–84	Jerome Carrier	Verdun Juniors
1984–85	Patrick Emond	Chicoutimi Sagueneens
1985–86	Jimmy Carson	Verdun Junior Canadiens
1986–87	Luc Beausoleil	Laval Voisins
1987–88	Stéphan Lebeau	Shawinigan Cataractes
1988–89	Steve Cadieux	Shawinigan Cataractes
1989–90	Andrew McKim	Hull Olympiques
1990–91	Yanic Perreault	Trois-Rivières Draveurs
1991–92	Martin Gendron	Saint-Hyacinthe Laser
1992–93	Martin Gendron	Saint-Hyacinthe Laser
1993–94	Yanick Dubé	Laval Titan
1994–95	Éric Dazé	Beauport Harfangs
1995–96	Christian Dubé	Sherbrooke Faucons
1996–97	Daniel Brière	Drummondville Voltigeurs
1997–98	Simon Laliberté	Moncton Wildcats
1998–99	Eric Chouinard	Quebec Remparts
1999–2000	Jonathan Roy	Moncton Wildcats
2000–01	Brandon Reid	Val-d'Or Foreurs
2001–02	Jason Pominville	Shawinigan Cataractes
2002–03	Patrick Thoresen	Baie-Comeau Drakkar
2003–04	Benoît Mondou	Shawinigan Cataractes
2004–05	David Desharnais	Chicoutimi Saguenéens
2005–06	David Desharnais	Chicoutimi Saguenéens
2006–07	David Desharnais	Chicoutimi Saguenéens
2007–08	Cedric McNicoll	Shawinigan Cataractes
2008–09	Cedric McNicoll	Shawinigan Cataractes
2009–10	Mike Hoffman	Saint John Sea Dogs
2010–11	Philip-Michael Devos	Gatineau Olympiques
2011–12	Zach O'Brien	Acadie-Bathurst Titan
2012–13	Zach O'Brien	Acadie-Bathurst Titan
2013–14	Frédérick Gaudreau	Drummondville Voltigeurs
2014–15	Kyle Farrell	Cape Breton Screaming Eagles
2015–16	Sam Girard	Shawinigan Cataractes
2016–17	Hugo Roy	Sherbrooke Phoenix
2017–18	Joël Teasdale	Blainville-Boisbriand Armada
2018–19	Peter Abbandonato	Rouyn-Noranda Huskies
2019–20	Jakob Pelletier	Moncton Wildcats
2020–21	Dawson Mercer	Chicoutimi Saguenéens
2021–22	Jordan Dumais	Halifax Mooseheads
2022–23	Attilio Biasca	Halifax Mooseheads
2023–24	Preston Lounsbury	Moncton Wildcats
2024–25	Julius Sumpf	Moncton Wildcats
2025–26	Alex Huang	Chicoutimi Saguenéens
