= Ian Laperrière =

Canadian- American ice hockey player

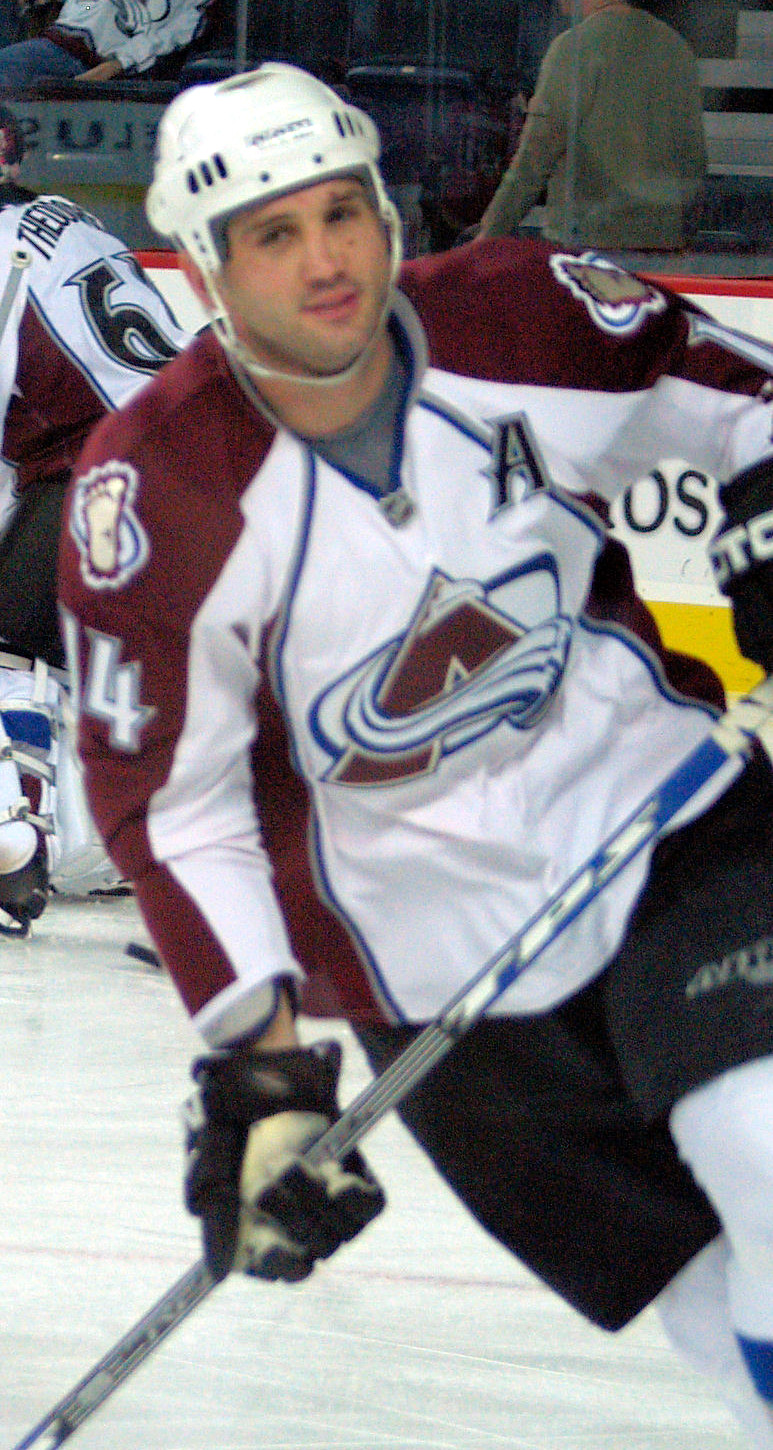
- Laperrière with the Colorado Avalanche in 2007
- Born: January 19, 1974 (age 52) Montreal, Quebec, Canada
- Height: 6 ft 1 in (185 cm)
- Weight: 200 lb (91 kg; 14 st 4 lb)
- Position: Right wing/Centre
- Shot: Right
- Played for: St. Louis Blues; New York Rangers; Los Angeles Kings; Colorado Avalanche; Philadelphia Flyers
- Coached for: Philadelphia Flyers (assistant)
- NHL draft: 158th overall, 1992; St. Louis Blues
- Playing career: 1993–2010
- Coaching career: 2013–2025

Ian Laperrière (born January 19, 1974) is a Canadian-American former professional ice hockey winger who played 16 seasons in the National Hockey League (NHL) and currently serves as a pro scout with the New York Islanders.

Laperrière spent nine seasons of his NHL career with the Los Angeles Kings and also played with the St. Louis Blues, New York Rangers, Colorado Avalanche, and Philadelphia Flyers prior to his 2012 retirement.

== Playing career ==
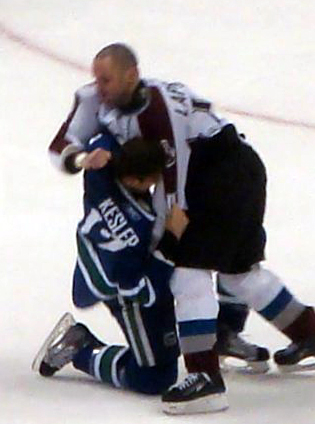
Laperrière, as a member of the Colorado Avalanche, fights Ryan Kesler of the Vancouver Canucks in April 2009

As a youth, Laperrière played in the 1988 Quebec International Pee-Wee Hockey Tournament with a minor ice hockey team from Montreal.

Laperrière played in the Quebec Major Junior Hockey League (QMJHL) from 1990 to 1993 and was drafted by the St. Louis Blues of the NHL in the seventh round and pick number 158 in the 1992 draft. He made his NHL debut with the Blues on March 3, 1994. He was traded to the New York Rangers for Stéphane Matteau on 28 December 1995. On March 14, 1996, he was traded with Ray Ferraro, Mattias Norström, Nathan LaFayette, and a draft pick to the Los Angeles Kings in exchange for Jari Kurri, Marty McSorley and Shane Churla. Laperrière was a mainstay on the Kings roster from 1996 until 2004. On July 2, 2004, Laperrière signed a free agent contract with the Colorado Avalanche.

Laperrière, affectionately known as 'Lappy' to his fans, was an immediate success with Colorado in the 2005–06 NHL season, posting the best points totals of his career. He scored 21 goals and 24 assists for 45 points, far ahead of his previous bests of 13 goals and 14 assists for 27 points in the lockout-shortened 1994–95 NHL season. He quickly became a favorite with the Avalanche fans.

Laperrière scored the 100th goal of his career on October 29, 2006, against the Minnesota Wild. He also passed 800 career games on November 28, against the Calgary Flames in a 5–2 loss.

On April 1, 2009, Laperrière fought with David Hale of the Phoenix Coyotes for his 52nd hockey fight in an Avalanche jersey, passing Scott Parker in all-time franchise fighting majors. He was announced as the Avalanches' Masterton Trophy nominee for the 2008–09 season on April 3, 2009. He played in his 1000th NHL game on April 11, 2009, against the Vancouver Canucks in a 0–1 home overtime loss. He led the team that year with 163 penalty minutes, just one more minute than Cody McLeod.

Unable to agree to a new deal with the Avalanche, Laperrière signed a three-year contract with the Philadelphia Flyers on July 1, 2009.

On November 27, 2009, Laperrière was hit with a slapshot in the mouth while killing a penalty at the end of the first period against the Buffalo Sabres. He sat out the second period receiving between 50 and 100 stitches but returned for the third period. He also played the following night against the Atlanta Thrashers. Laperrière lost seven teeth resulting from the incident (two fake and five real). A similar event occurred during the 2010 Stanley Cup playoffs on April 22. Laperrière was hit in the face near the end of a New Jersey power play, resulting in an orbital injury, and a mild concussion. Laperrière was listed as out indefinitely and his return to the playoffs was considered unlikely. However, after missing the Flyers second round series versus the Boston Bruins, he returned for game 4 of the Eastern Conference Finals against the Montreal Canadiens. In the May 2010 edition of The Hockey News, Laperrière was awarded THN's John Ferguson Award for "Toughest Player in the NHL" in the 2009–10 season.

== Post-playing career ==
=== NHL retirement ===
During training camp in September 2010, Laperrière experienced symptoms of post-concussion syndrome and nerve damage to his eyes from being hit in the face twice by pucks the previous season. He was then out for the entire 2010–11 season after being put on injured reserve before the season began and then on long-term injured reserve in mid-December to free up salary cap space. Doctors advised Laperrière to retire, although he did not do so at the time. The move was repeated again for the 2011–12 season to free up cap space when Laperrière's symptoms still had not subsided. His number 14 was reissued to rookie Sean Couturier. Despite never playing again after the 2010 Stanley Cup Finals, Laperrière continued to serve the Flyers off the ice as a mentor to younger players in the organization and in other capacities. For that, Laperrière was awarded the 2011 Bill Masterton Trophy for his perseverance in the sport of hockey. Laperrière officially retired June 12, 2012.

=== Philadelphia Flyers ===
On June 29, 2012, Laperrière was named director of player development for the Philadelphia Flyers. The following year, in 2013, he also began serving as an assistant coach for the Flyers. Laperrière returned to the Flyers front office, to serve as Advisor to Hockey Operations in May 2025.

=== Lehigh Valley Phantoms head coach ===
On June 5, 2021, Laperrière was named head coach of the Lehigh Valley Phantoms, the American Hockey League affiliate of the Philadelphia Flyers and the primary development team for the Flyers. On May 27, 2025, former teammate and Flyers general manager Danny Brière announced that Laperrière would transition from his role as head coach of the Phantoms and serve as an advisor to him and President of Hockey Operations, Keith Jones.

== Personal life ==
Laperrière is married to Magali and has two sons: Tristan, born in March 2002, and Zachary, born in April 2004.

He was sworn in as a naturalized American citizen on August 30, 2011, in a ceremony in Mount Laurel, New Jersey.

Following his retirement from hockey, he turned his attention to triathlon completing the Ironman North American Championship at Mont-Tremblant in the Laurentian Mountains in 12 hours, 11 minutes, 55 seconds on August 19, 2013. He also ran the Philadelphia Marathon in 2012.

Laperrière and his family live in Haddonfield, New Jersey.

=== Films ===
- In 2005, Laperrière portrayed Montreal Canadiens Hall of Famer Bernie "Boom Boom" Geoffrion in The Rocket, a film about the life of Maurice Richard who played with the Canadiens from 1942 to 1960.
- In 2012, Laperrière appeared in the movie This Is 40 alongside Scott Hartnell, James van Riemsdyk, and Matt Carle.

== Career statistics ==
| | | | Regular season | | | | | Playoffs |
| Season | Team | League | GP | G | A | Pts | PIM | GP | G | A | Pts | PIM |
|---|---|---|---|---|---|---|---|---|---|---|---|---|
| 1989–90 | Montréal-Bourassa | QMAAA | 22 | 4 | 10 | 14 | 10 | 3 | 0 | 1 | 1 | 6 |
| 1990–91 | Drummondville Voltigeurs | QMJHL | 65 | 19 | 29 | 48 | 117 | 14 | 2 | 9 | 11 | 48 |
| 1990–91 | Drummondville Voltigeurs | MC | — | — | — | — | — | 5 | 3 | 1 | 4 | 10 |
| 1991–92 | Drummondville Voltigeurs | QMJHL | 70 | 28 | 49 | 77 | 160 | 4 | 2 | 2 | 4 | 9 |
| 1992–93 | Drummondville Voltigeurs | QMJHL | 60 | 44 | 96 | 140 | 188 | 10 | 6 | 13 | 19 | 20 |
| 1993–94 | Drummondville Voltigeurs | QMJHL | 62 | 41 | 72 | 113 | 150 | 9 | 4 | 6 | 10 | 35 |
| 1993–94 | St. Louis Blues | NHL | 1 | 0 | 0 | 0 | 0 | — | — | — | — | — |
| 1993–94 | Peoria Rivermen | IHL | — | — | — | — | — | 5 | 1 | 3 | 4 | 2 |
| 1994–95 | Peoria Rivermen | IHL | 51 | 16 | 32 | 48 | 111 | — | — | — | — | — |
| 1994–95 | St. Louis Blues | NHL | 37 | 13 | 14 | 27 | 85 | 7 | 0 | 4 | 4 | 21 |
| 1995–96 | Worcester IceCats | AHL | 3 | 2 | 1 | 3 | 22 | — | — | — | — | — |
| 1995–96 | St. Louis Blues | NHL | 33 | 3 | 6 | 9 | 87 | — | — | — | — | — |
| 1995–96 | New York Rangers | NHL | 28 | 1 | 2 | 3 | 53 | — | — | — | — | — |
| 1995–96 | Los Angeles Kings | NHL | 10 | 2 | 3 | 5 | 15 | — | — | — | — | — |
| 1996–97 | Los Angeles Kings | NHL | 62 | 8 | 15 | 23 | 102 | — | — | — | — | — |
| 1997–98 | Los Angeles Kings | NHL | 77 | 6 | 15 | 21 | 131 | 4 | 1 | 0 | 1 | 6 |
| 1998–99 | Los Angeles Kings | NHL | 72 | 3 | 10 | 13 | 138 | — | — | — | — | — |
| 1999–2000 | Los Angeles Kings | NHL | 79 | 9 | 13 | 22 | 185 | 4 | 0 | 0 | 0 | 2 |
| 2000–01 | Los Angeles Kings | NHL | 79 | 8 | 10 | 18 | 141 | 13 | 1 | 2 | 3 | 12 |
| 2001–02 | Los Angeles Kings | NHL | 81 | 8 | 14 | 22 | 125 | 7 | 0 | 1 | 1 | 9 |
| 2002–03 | Los Angeles Kings | NHL | 73 | 7 | 12 | 19 | 122 | — | — | — | — | — |
| 2003–04 | Los Angeles Kings | NHL | 62 | 10 | 12 | 22 | 58 | — | — | — | — | — |
| 2005–06 | Colorado Avalanche | NHL | 82 | 21 | 24 | 45 | 116 | 9 | 0 | 1 | 1 | 27 |
| 2006–07 | Colorado Avalanche | NHL | 81 | 8 | 21 | 29 | 133 | — | — | — | — | — |
| 2007–08 | Colorado Avalanche | NHL | 70 | 4 | 15 | 19 | 140 | 10 | 1 | 1 | 2 | 19 |
| 2008–09 | Colorado Avalanche | NHL | 74 | 7 | 12 | 19 | 163 | — | — | — | — | — |
| 2009–10 | Philadelphia Flyers | NHL | 82 | 3 | 17 | 20 | 162 | 13 | 0 | 1 | 1 | 6 |
| NHL totals | | | 1,083 | 121 | 215 | 336 | 1,956 | 67 | 3 | 10 | 13 | 102 |

== See also ==
- List of NHL players with 1,000 games played

Awards and achievements
| Preceded by José Théodore | Bill Masterton Memorial Trophy winner 2011 | Succeeded by Max Pacioretty |
