= Rod Branch =

Canadian ice hockey player

- Born: April 14, 1975 (age 50) Fort St. John, British Columbia, Canada
- Height: 5 ft 8 in (173 cm)
- Weight: 165 lb (75 kg; 11 st 11 lb)
- Position: Goaltender
- Played for: WPHL; New Mexico Scorpions; CHL; Tulsa Oilers; Topeka Scarecrows; Oklahoma City Blazers; UHL; Motor City Mechanics
- NHL draft: Undrafted
- Playing career: 1996–2006

Rod Branch (born April 14, 1975) is a Canadian former professional ice hockey goaltender. During his eight seasons in the Central Hockey League (CHL), Branch posted 22 shutouts to retire as the CHL's all-time career shut-out leader.

Born in Fort St. John, British Columbia, Branch played four seasons (1992–1996) of major junior hockey in the Western Hockey League. He turned professional during the 1996–97 season, and went on to play ten seasons of pro hockey, including six seasons with the Tulsa Oilers of the Central Hockey League.

== Awards and honours ==
Award	Year
Central Hockey League Career Shutout Leader (22)	2003–04
