= 1993–94 QMJHL season =

Canadian junior ice hockey season

QMJHL's 25th anniversary logo

The 1993–94 QMJHL season was the 25th season in the history of the Quebec Major Junior Hockey League. The QMJHL unveils a special logo/patch for its 25th anniversary. The league expands northward, granting an expansion franchise in Val-d'Or, Quebec. Thirteen teams played 72 games each in the schedule. The Laval Titan finished first overall in the regular season winning the Jean Rougeau Trophy. The Chicoutimi Saguenéens won their second President's Cup, defeating Laval in the finals.

== Team changes ==
- The Val-d'Or Foreurs join the league as an expansion franchise, playing in the Lebel Division.

== Final standings ==
Note: GP = Games played; W = Wins; L = Losses; T = Ties; Pts = Points; GF = Goals for; GA = Goals against

Dilio Division	GP	W	L	T	Pts	GF	GA
Chicoutimi Saguenéens	72	43	24	5	91	340	254
Sherbrooke Faucons	72	41	29	2	84	317	247
Beauport Harfangs	72	36	30	6	78	298	287
Shawinigan Cataractes	72	36	31	5	77	316	313
Drummondville Voltigeurs	72	31	35	6	68	289	308
Victoriaville Tigres	72	17	51	4	38	261	404

Lebel Division	GP	W	L	T	Pts	GF	GA
Laval Titan	72	49	22	1	99	346	247
Verdun Collège Français	72	41	29	2	84	278	242
Hull Olympiques	72	38	31	3	79	310	304
Saint-Hyacinthe Laser	72	35	30	7	77	297	290
Saint-Jean Lynx	72	29	37	6	64	264	265
Granby Bisons	72	30	40	2	62	297	309
Val-d'Or Foreurs	72	17	54	1	35	254	397

- Complete list of standings

== Scoring leaders ==
Note: GP = Games played; G = Goals; A = Assists; Pts = Points; PIM = Penalties in Minutes

Player	Team	GP	G	A	Pts	PIM
Yanick Dube	Laval Titan	64	66	75	141	30
Hugo Proulx	Hull Olympiques	72	47	82	129	61
Michel St. Jacques	Chicoutimi Saguenéens	62	58	68	126	86
Dave Tremblay	Shawinigan Cataractes	71	50	76	126	10
Jocelyn Langlois	Verdun Collège Français	72	43	80	123	53
Danny Beauregard	Chicoutimi Saguenéens	61	39	82	121	66
Patrick Carignan	Shawinigan Cataractes	70	31	82	113	46
Ian Laperriere	Drummondville Voltigeurs	62	41	72	113	150
Samuel Groleau	Saint-Jean Lynx	69	37	73	110	40
Aleksey Lozhkin	Chicoutimi Saguenéens	66	40	67	107	68
Eric Daze	Beauport Harfangs	66	59	48	107	31

- Complete scoring statistics

== Playoffs ==
The leading scorers of the playoffs were Danny Beauregard (16 goals, 27 assists) and Aleksey Lozhkin (9 goals, 34 assists) with 43 points each.

First round

- Laval Titan defeated Victoriaville Tigres 4 games to 1.
- Chicoutimi Saguenéens defeated Granby Bisons 4 games to 3.
- Sherbrooke Faucons defeated Saint-Jean Lynx 4 games to 1.
- Drummondville Voltigeurs defeated Verdun Collège Français 4 games to 0.
- Hull Olympiques defeated Saint-Hyacinthe Laser 4 games to 3.
- Beauport Harfangs defeated Shawinigan Cataractes 4 games to 1.

Quarterfinals

Note: GP = Games played; W = Wins; L = Losses; T = Ties; Pts = Points; GF = Goals for; GA = Goals against

Round-robin standings	GP	W	L	T	Pts	GF	GA
Laval Titan	6	4	2	0	8	26	20
Hull Olympiques	6	4	2	0	8	26	27
Beauport Harfangs	6	4	2	0	8	20	16
Chicoutimi Saguenéens ^{‡}	7	4	3	0	8	25	24
Sherbrooke Faucons ^{‡}	7	3	4	0	6	26	26
Drummondville Voltigeurs	6	0	6	0	0	18	28

^{‡} Chicoutimi Saguenéens defeated Sherbrooke Faucons in a one-game playoff to determine 4th place in the round-robin standings.

Semifinals

- Laval Titan defeated Beauport Harfangs 4 games to 0.
- Chicoutimi Saguenéens defeated Hull Olympiques 4 games to 3.

Finals

- Chicoutimi Saguenéens defeated Laval Titan 4 games to 2.

== All-star teams ==
First team

- Goaltender - Emmanuel Fernandez, Laval Titan
- Left defence - Joel Bouchard, Verdun Collège Français
- Right defence - Steve Gosselin, Chicoutimi Saguenéens
- Left winger - Michel St. Jacques, Chicoutimi Saguenéens
- Centreman - Yanick Dube, Laval Titan
- Right winger - Eric Daze, Beauport Harfangs
- Coach - Michel Therrien, Laval Titan

Second team

- Goaltender - Philippe DeRouville, Verdun Collège Français
- Left defence - Eric Messier, Sherbrooke Faucons
- Right defence - Stephane Julien, Sherbrooke Faucons
- Left winger - Francois Leroux, Verdun Collège Français
- Centreman - Danny Beauregard, Chicoutimi Saguenéens
- Right winger - Christian Matte, Granby Bisons
- Coach - Richard Martel, Saint-Hyacinthe Laser

Rookie team

- Goaltender - Sylvain Daigle, Shawinigan Cataractes
- Left defence - Jimmy Drolet, Saint-Hyacinthe Laser
- Right defence - Jason Doig, Saint-Jean Lynx
- Left winger - Eric Landry, Saint-Hyacinthe Laser
- Centreman - Christian Dube, Sherbrooke Faucons
- Right winger - Aleksey Lozhkin, Chicoutimi Saguenéens
- Coach - Richard Martel, Saint-Hyacinthe Laser

List of First/Second/Rookie team all-stars

== Trophies and awards ==
Team

- President's Cup - Playoff Champions, Chicoutimi Saguenéens
- Jean Rougeau Trophy - Regular Season Champions, Laval Titan
- Robert Lebel Trophy - Team with best GAA, Verdun Collège Français

Player

- Michel Brière Memorial Trophy - Most Valuable Player, Emmanuel Fernandez, Laval Titan
- Jean Béliveau Trophy - Top Scorer, Yanick Dube, Laval Titan
- Guy Lafleur Trophy - Playoff MVP, Eric Fichaud, Chicoutimi Saguenéens
- Shell Cup – Offensive - Offensive Player of the Year, Yanick Dube, Laval Titan
- Shell Cup – Defensive - Defensive Player of the Year, Steve Gosselin, Chicoutimi Saguenéens
- Transamerica Plaque - Best plus/minus total, Michel St. Jacques, Chicoutimi Saguenéens
- Jacques Plante Memorial Trophy - Best GAA, Philippe DeRouville, Verdun Collège Français
- Emile Bouchard Trophy - Defenceman of the Year, Steve Gosselin, Chicoutimi Saguenéens
- Mike Bossy Trophy - Best Pro Prospect, Eric Fichaud, Chicoutimi Sagueneens
- Molson Cup - Rookie of the Year, Christian Matte, Granby Bisons
- Michel Bergeron Trophy - Offensive Rookie of the Year, Christian Dube, Sherbrooke Faucons
- Raymond Lagacé Trophy - Defensive Rookie of the Year, Jimmy Drolet, Saint-Hyacinthe Laser
- Frank J. Selke Memorial Trophy - Most sportsmanlike player, Yanick Dube, Laval Titan
- QMJHL Humanitarian of the Year - Humanitarian of the Year, Stephane Roy, Val-d'Or Foreurs
- Marcel Robert Trophy - Best Scholastic Player, Patrick Boileau, Laval Titan
- Paul Dumont Trophy - Personality of the Year, Yanick Dube, Laval Titan

Executive

- Ron Lapointe Trophy - Coach of the Year, Richard Martel, Saint-Hyacinthe Laser
- John Horman Trophy - Executive of the Year, Jean-Claude Morrissette, Laval Titan
- St-Clair Group Plaque - Marketing Director of the Year, Michel Boisvert, Shawinigan Cataractes

== See also ==
- 1994 Memorial Cup
- 1994 NHL entry draft
- 1993–94 OHL season
- 1993–94 WHL season

Preceded by 1992–93 QMJHL season	QMJHL seasons	Succeeded by 1994–95 QMJHL season
