= 1992–93 QMJHL season =

Canadian junior ice hockey season

The 1992–93 QMJHL season was the 24th season in the history of the Quebec Major Junior Hockey League. The league inaugurates the Ron Lapointe Trophy, for the "Coach of the Year," and the QMJHL Humanitarian of the Year award. Twelve teams played 70 games each in the schedule. The Sherbrooke Faucons finished first overall in the regular season winning the Jean Rougeau Trophy. The Laval Titan won their third President's Cup, defeating Sherbrooke in the finals.

== Team changes ==
- The Trois-Rivières Draveurs relocated to Sherbrooke, Quebec, becoming the Sherbrooke Faucons.

== Final standings ==
Note: GP = Games played; W = Wins; L = Losses; T = Ties; Pts = Points; GF = Goals for; GA = Goals against

Dilio Division	GP	W	L	T	Pts	GF	GA
Sherbrooke Faucons	70	44	20	6	94	302	241
Victoriaville Tigres	70	43	26	1	87	358	296
Chicoutimi Saguenéens	70	38	29	3	79	342	321
Drummondville Voltigeurs	70	39	30	1	73	353	303
Shawinigan Cataractes	70	19	46	5	43	262	357
Beauport Harfangs	70	17	51	2	36	243	349

Lebel Division	GP	W	L	T	Pts	GF	GA
Laval Titan	70	43	25	2	88	367	277
Hull Olympiques	70	40	28	2	82	296	268
Saint-Jean Lynx	70	35	32	3	73	282	276
Verdun Collège Français	70	34	34	2	70	286	279
Saint-Hyacinthe Laser	70	29	37	4	62	312	320
Granby Bisons	70	23	46	1	47	288	414

- Complete list of standings

== Scoring leaders ==
Note: GP = Games played; G = Goals; A = Assists; Pts = Points; PIM = Penalties in Minutes

Player	Team	GP	G	A	Pts	PIM
Rene Corbet	Drummondville Voltigeurs	63	79	69	148	143
Ian Laperriere	Drummondville Voltigeurs	60	44	96	140	188
Alexandre Daigle	Victoriaville Tigres	53	45	92	137	85
Martin Gendron	Saint-Hyacinthe Laser	63	73	61	134	44
Claude Savoie	Victoriaville Tigres	67	70	61	131	113
Eric Veilleux	Laval Titan	70	55	70	125	100
Michel St. Jacques	Chicoutimi Saguenéens	59	53	67	120	51
Matthew Barnaby	Beauport / Verdun / Victoriaville	65	44	67	111	448
Martin Tanguay	Verdeun / Beauport / Saint-Jean	72	53	68	111	78
Stephane St. Amour	Saint-Jean / Chicoutimi	66	45	64	109	48

- Complete scoring statistics

== Playoffs ==
Martin Lapointe was the leading scorer of the playoffs with 30 points (13 goals, 17 assists).

Division Semifinals
D1	Sherbrooke	4
D3	Chicoutimi	0
L2	Hull	4
L3	Saint-Jean	0
L1	Laval	4
L4	Verdun	0
D2	Victoriaville	2
D4	Drummondville	4

Division Finals
D1	Sherbrooke	4
L2	Hull	2
L1	Laval	4
D4	Drummondville	0

League Finals
D1	Sherbrooke	1
L1	Laval	4

== All-star teams ==
First team

- Goaltender - Jocelyn Thibault, Sherbrooke Faucons
- Left defence - Benoit Larose, Laval Titan
- Right defence - Stephane Julien, Sherbrooke Faucons
- Left winger - Rene Corbet, Drummondville Voltigeurs
- Centreman - Alexandre Daigle, Victoriaville Tigres
- Right winger - Martin Lapointe, Laval Titan
- Coach - Guy Chouinard, Sherbrooke Faucons

Second team

- Goaltender - Philippe DeRouville, Verdun Collège Français
- Left defence - Steve Gosselin, Chicoutimi Saguenéens
- Right defence - Yan Arsenault, Verdun Collège Français
- Left winger - Michel St. Jacques, Chicoutimi Saguenéens
- Centreman - Ian Laperriere, Drummondville Voltigeurs
- Right winger - Martin Gendron, Saint-Hyacinthe Laser
- Coach - Bob Hartley, Laval Titan

Rookie team

- Goaltender - Stephane Routhier, Drummondville Voltigeurs
- Left defence - Sebastien Bety, Drummondville Voltigeurs
- Right defence - Christian Laflamme, Verdun Collège Français
- Left winger - Jean-Yves Leroux, Beauport Harfangs
- Centreman - Steve Brûlé, Saint-Jean Lynx
- Right winger - Christian Matte, Granby Bisons
- Coach - Alain Rajotte, Verdun Collège Français

List of First/Second/Rookie team all-stars

== Trophies and awards ==
Team

- President's Cup - Playoff Champions, Laval Titan
- Jean Rougeau Trophy - Regular Season Champions, Sherbrooke Faucons
- Robert Lebel Trophy - Team with best GAA, Sherbrooke Faucons

Player

- Michel Brière Memorial Trophy - Most Valuable Player, Jocelyn Thibault, Sherbrooke Faucons
- Jean Béliveau Trophy - Top Scorer, Rene Corbet, Drummondville Voltigeurs
- Guy Lafleur Trophy - Playoff MVP, Emmanuel Fernandez, Laval Titan
- Shell Cup – Offensive - Offensive Player of the Year, Rene Corbet, Drummondville Voltigeurs
- Shell Cup – Defensive - Defensive Player of the Year, Jocelyn Thibault, Sherbrooke Faucons
- Transamerica Plaque - Best plus/minus total, Claude Savoie, Victoriaville Tigres
- Jacques Plante Memorial Trophy - Best GAA, Jocelyn Thibault, Sherbrooke Faucons
- Emile Bouchard Trophy - Defenceman of the Year, Benoit Larose, Laval Titan
- Mike Bossy Trophy - Best Pro Prospect, Alexandre Daigle, Victoriaville Tigres
- Molson Cup - Rookie of the Year, Ian Laperriere, Drummondville Voltigeurs & Martin Lapointe, Laval Titan
- Michel Bergeron Trophy - Offensive Rookie of the Year, Steve Brûlé, Saint-Jean Lynx
- Raymond Lagacé Trophy - Defensive Rookie of the Year, Stephane Routhier, Drummondville Voltigeurs
- Frank J. Selke Memorial Trophy - Most sportsmanlike player, Martin Gendron, Saint-Hyacinthe Laser
- QMJHL Humanitarian of the Year - Humanitarian of the Year, Jean Nadeau, Shawinigan Cataractes
- Marcel Robert Trophy - Best Scholastic Player, Jocelyn Thibault, Sherbrooke Faucons
- Paul Dumont Trophy - Personality of the Year, Martin Lapointe, Laval Titan

Executive

- Ron Lapointe Trophy - Coach of the Year, Guy Chouinard, Sherbrooke Faucons
- John Horman Trophy - Executive of the Year, Georges Marien, Saint-Jean Lynx
- St-Clair Group Plaque - Marketing Director of the Year, Stephane Tousignant, Drummondville Voltigeurs

== See also ==
- 1993 Memorial Cup
- 1993 NHL entry draft
- 1992–93 OHL season
- 1992–93 WHL season

Preceded by 1991–92 QMJHL season	QMJHL seasons	Succeeded by 1993–94 QMJHL season
