= 1999–2000 AHL season =

- League: American Hockey League
- Sport: Ice hockey

Regular season
- Macgregor Kilpatrick Trophy: Hartford Wolf Pack
- Season MVP: Martin Brochu
- Top scorer: Christian Matte

Playoffs
- Playoffs MVP: Derek Armstrong

Calder Cup
- Champions: Hartford Wolf Pack
- Runners-up: Rochester Americans

AHL seasons
- 1998–99 2000–01

The 1999–2000 AHL season was the 64th season of the American Hockey League. Nineteen teams played 80 games each in the schedule. The Hartford Wolf Pack finished first overall in the regular season, and won their first Calder Cup championship.

== Team changes ==
- The Adirondack Red Wings ceased operations.
- The Beast of New Haven ceased operations.
- The Fredericton Canadiens moved to Quebec City, Quebec, becoming the Quebec Citadelles, playing in the Atlantic division.
- The Louisville Panthers joined the AHL as an expansion team, based in Louisville, Kentucky, playing in the Mid-Atlantic division.
- The dormant Cornwall Aces resumed operations as the Wilkes-Barre/Scranton Penguins, based in the greater Wilkes-Barre/Scranton area in Pennsylvania, playing in the Empire State division.
- The Portland Pirates switched divisions from Atlantic to New England

== Final standings ==
- y– indicates team clinched division and a playoff spot
- x– indicates team clinched a playoff spot
- e– indicates team was eliminated from playoff contention

=== Eastern Conference ===
Atlantic Division	GP	W	L	T	OTL	Pts	GF	GA
y–Quebec Citadelles (MTL)	80	37	34	5	4	83	227	238
x–Saint John Flames (CGY)	80	32	32	11	5	80	267	283
x–Lowell Lock Monsters (LAK/NYI)	80	33	36	7	4	77	228	240
e–St. John's Maple Leafs (TOR)	80	23	45	8	4	58	202	277

New England Division	GP	W	L	T	OTL	Pts	GF	GA
y–Hartford Wolf Pack (NYR)	80	49	22	7	2	107	249	198
x–Portland Pirates (WSH)	80	46	23	10	1	103	256	202
x–Worcester IceCats (STL)	80	34	31	11	4	83	249	250
x–Springfield Falcons (PHX)	80	33	35	11	1	78	272	252
x–Providence Bruins (BOS)	80	33	38	6	3	75	231	269

=== Western Conference ===
Empire State Division	GP	W	L	T	OTL	Pts	GF	GA
y–Rochester Americans (BUF)	80	46	22	9	3	104	247	201
x–Syracuse Crunch (VAN)	80	35	35	9	1	80	290	294
x–Hamilton Bulldogs (EDM)	80	27	34	13	6	73	225	262
x–Albany River Rats (NJD)	80	30	40	7	3	70	225	250
e–Wilkes-Barre/Scranton Penguins (PIT)	80	23	43	9	5	60	236	306

Mid-Atlantic Division	GP	W	L	T	OTL	Pts	GF	GA
y–Kentucky Thoroughblades (SJS)	80	42	25	9	4	97	250	211
x–Hershey Bears (COL)	80	43	29	5	3	94	297	267
x–Philadelphia Phantoms (PHI)	80	44	31	3	2	93	281	239
x–Louisville Panthers (FLA)	80	42	30	7	1	92	278	254
e–Cincinnati Mighty Ducks (ANA/DET)	80	30	37	9	4	73	227	244

== Scoring leaders ==
Note: GP = Games played; G = Goals; A = Assists; Pts = Points; PIM = Penalty minutes

Player	Team	GP	G	A	Pts	PIM
Christian Matte	Hershey Bears	73	43	61	104	85
Mike Maneluk	Philadelphia Phantoms	73	47	40	87	158
Derek Armstrong	Hartford Wolf Pack	77	28	54	82	101
Mark Greig	Philadelphia Phantoms	68	34	48	82	116
Serge Aubin	Hershey Bears	58	42	38	80	56
Mike Craig	Kentucky Thoroughblades	76	39	39	78	116
Brad Smyth	Hartford Wolf Pack	80	39	37	76	62
Steve Brule	Albany River Rats	75	30	46	76	18
Eric Boguniecki	Louisville Panthers	57	33	42	75	148
Daniel Cleary	Hamilton Bulldogs	58	22	52	74	108

- complete list

== Calder Cup playoffs ==
Division Semifinals	Division Finals
A1	Quebec	0
N5	Providence	3
N5	Providence	4
A3	Lowell	0
A2	Saint John	0
A3	Lowell	3
Eastern Conference
N1	Hartford	3
N4	Springfield	2
N1	Hartford	4
N3	Worcester	1
N2	Portland	1
N3	Worcester	3
E1	Rochester	3
E4	Albany	2
E1	Rochester	4
E3	Hamilton	2
E2	Syracuse	1
E3	Hamilton	3
Western Conference
M1	Kentucky	3
M4	Louisville	1
M1	Kentucky	1
M2	Hershey	4
M2	Hershey	3
M3	Philadelphia	2

Conference Finals
N5	Providence	3
N1	Hartford	4
E1	Rochester	4
M2	Hershey	0

Calder Cup Final
N1	Hartford	4
E1	Rochester	2

== All Star Classic ==
The 13th AHL All-Star Game was played on January 17, 2000, at the Blue Cross Arena in Rochester, New York. Team Canada defeated Team PlanetUSA 8–3. In the skills competition held the day before the All-Star Game, Team PlanetUSA won 17–12 over Team Canada.

== Trophy and award winners ==
=== Team awards ===
Calder Cup; Playoff champions:	Hartford Wolf Pack
Richard F. Canning Trophy; Eastern Conference playoff champions:	Hartford Wolf Pack
Robert W. Clarke Trophy; Western Conference playoff champions:	Rochester Americans
Macgregor Kilpatrick Trophy; Regular season champions, League:	Hartford Wolf Pack
Frank Mathers Trophy; Regular season champions, Mid-Atlantic Division:	Kentucky Thoroughblades
F. G. "Teddy" Oke Trophy; Regular season champions, New England Division:	Hartford Wolf Pack
Sam Pollock Trophy; Regular season champions, Atlantic Division:	Quebec Citadelles
John D. Chick Trophy; Regular season champions, Empire State Division:	Rochester Americans

=== Individual awards ===
Les Cunningham Award; Most valuable player:	Martin Brochu - Portland Pirates
John B. Sollenberger Trophy; Top point scorer:	Christian Matte - Hershey Bears
Dudley "Red" Garrett Memorial Award; Rookie of the year:	Mika Noronen - Rochester Americans
Eddie Shore Award; Defenceman of the year:	Brad Tiley - Springfield Falcons
Aldege "Baz" Bastien Memorial Award; Best goaltender:	Martin Brochu - Portland Pirates
Harry "Hap" Holmes Memorial Award; Lowest goals against average:	Milan Hnilicka & Jean-Francois Labbe - Hartford Wolf Pack
Louis A. R. Pieri Memorial Award; Coach of the year:	Glen Hanlon - Portland Pirates
Fred T. Hunt Memorial Award; Sportsmanship / Perseverance:	Randy Cunneyworth - Rochester Americans
Yanick Dupre Memorial Award; Community Service Award:	Mike Minard - Hamilton Bulldogs
Jack A. Butterfield Trophy; MVP of the playoffs:	Derek Armstrong - Hartford Wolf Pack

=== Other awards ===
James C. Hendy Memorial Award; Most outstanding executive:	Doug Yingst, Hershey Bears
Thomas Ebright Memorial Award; Career contributions:	Bryan Lewis
James H. Ellery Memorial Awards; Outstanding media coverage:	Dave Sottile, Hershey, (newspaper); Greg Waddell, Cincinnati, (radio); WBRE-TV, Wilkes-Barre/Scranton, (television)
Ken McKenzie Award; Outstanding marketing executive:	Brian Magness & Rich Hixon, Wilkes-Barre/Scranton Penguins

== See also ==
- List of AHL seasons

Preceded by 1998–99 AHL season	AHL seasons	Succeeded by 2000–01 AHL season
