= Jean-Marc Lanthier (ice hockey) =

Canadian ice hockey player

- Born: March 27, 1963 (age 63) Montreal, Quebec, Canada
- Height: 6 ft 2 in (188 cm)
- Weight: 195 lb (88 kg; 13 st 13 lb)
- Position: Right wing
- Shot: Right
- Played for: Vancouver Canucks
- NHL draft: 52nd overall, 1981; Vancouver Canucks
- Playing career: 1983–1990

Jean-Marc Lanthier (born March 27, 1963) is a Canadian former professional ice hockey player who spent parts of four seasons in the National Hockey League for the Vancouver Canucks during the mid-1980s. He also played several years in the minor American Hockey League and retired in 1990.

== Biography ==
Lanthier was born in Montreal, Quebec. As a youth, he played in the 1976 Quebec International Pee-Wee Hockey Tournament with a minor ice hockey team from Montreal.

A gifted junior scorer, Lanthier was selected in the third round (52nd overall) of the 1981 Entry Draft by the Canucks. In his last two junior seasons with the Laval Voisins, he was a linemate of a young Mario Lemieux. He turned pro in 1983, spending most of the 1983–84 season in the AHL, where he notched 25 goals in 60 games for the Fredericton Express. He also earned an 11-game call-up to the Canucks, highlighted by scoring his first two NHL goals in his hometown of Montreal on February 9, 1984.

Lanthier continued to produce well in the AHL in 1984–85, earning another 27 games with the Canucks, in which he scored 6 goals and 10 points. He was allowed to play full-time for the Canucks in 1985–86, appearing in a career-high 62 games. However, for a skilled player, his production proved somewhat disappointing as he recorded just 7 goals and 17 points. For 1986–87, he found himself back in the AHL and suffered through a miserable year in which he recorded just 15 goals and failed to see any NHL action. He would rebound in 1987–88 with a monster year in the AHL, finishing 2nd in the league with totals of 71 assists and 106 points. His strong play earned him another call-up to Vancouver, where he recorded a goal and an assist in 5 games.

In the summer of 1988, Lanthier signed as a free agent with the Boston Bruins. However, he spent only a few months in that organization before being dealt to the New Jersey Devils. He spent the final two seasons of his career with the Utica Devils, New Jersey's AHL farm team, before retiring in 1990.

Lanthier finished his career with 16 goals and 16 assists for 32 points in 105 NHL games, all with the Vancouver Canucks, along with 29 penalty minutes.

== Career statistics ==
=== Regular season and playoffs ===
			Regular season					Playoffs
Season	Team	League	GP	G	A	Pts	PIM	GP	G	A	Pts	PIM
1978–79	Mercier Sportive	QAAA	—	—	—	—	—	—	—	—	—	—
1979–80	Quebec Remparts	QMJHL	63	14	32	46	4	5	0	1	1	0
1980–81	Quebec Remparts	QMJHL	37	13	32	45	18	—	—	—	—	—
1980–81	Sorel Éperviers	QMJHL	35	6	33	39	29	7	1	4	5	4
1981–82	Laval Voisins	QMJHL	60	44	34	78	48	18	8	11	19	8
1982–83	Laval Voisins	QMJHL	69	39	71	110	54	12	6	17	23	8
1983–84	Vancouver Canucks	NHL	11	2	1	3	2	—	—	—	—	—
1983–84	Fredericton Express	AHL	60	25	17	42	29	7	4	6	10	0
1984–85	Vancouver Canucks	NHL	27	6	4	10	13	—	—	—	—	—
1984–85	Fredericton Express	AHL	50	21	21	42	13	4	1	1	2	4
1985–86	Vancouver Canucks	NHL	62	7	10	17	12	—	—	—	—	—
1985–86	Fredericton Express	AHL	7	5	5	10	2	—	—	—	—	—
1986–87	Fredericton Express	AHL	78	15	38	53	24	—	—	—	—	—
1987–88	Vancouver Canucks	NHL	5	1	1	2	2	—	—	—	—	—
1987–88	Fredericton Express	AHL	74	35	71	106	37	15	3	8	11	14
1988–89	Maine Mariners	AHL	24	7	16	23	16	—	—	—	—	—
1988–89	Utica Devils	AHL	55	23	26	49	22	3	3	0	3	2
1989–90	Utica Devils	AHL	50	13	19	32	32	4	1	1	2	2
1989–90	Fort Wayne Komets	IHL	7	4	7	11	4	—	—	—	—	—
AHL totals			398	144	213	357	175	33	12	16	28	22
NHL totals			105	16	16	32	29	—	—	—	—	—
