= Cape Breton Eagles =

Junior ice hockey team in Nova Scotia, Canada

- City: Cape Breton Regional Municipality, Nova Scotia
- League: Quebec Maritimes Junior Hockey League
- Conference: Eastern
- Division: Maritimes
- Founded: 1969
- Home arena: Centre 200
- Colours: Black, white, gold and grey
- General manager: Sylvain Couturier
- Head coach: Jason Clarke
- Website: chl.ca/lhjmq-eagles

Franchise history
- 1969–1977: Sorel Éperviers
- 1977–1979: Verdun Éperviers
- 1979–1980: Sorel/Verdun Éperviers
- 1980–1981: Sorel Éperviers
- 1981–1995: Granby Bisons
- 1995–1997: Granby Prédateurs
- 1997–2019: Cape Breton Screaming Eagles
- 2019–present: Cape Breton Eagles

Current uniform

The Cape Breton Eagles is a Canadian junior ice hockey team in the Quebec Maritimes Junior Hockey League (QMJHL) based in Cape Breton Regional Municipality, Nova Scotia. They are members of the Maritimes Division, and play their home games at Centre 200 in Sydney, Nova Scotia.

== History ==
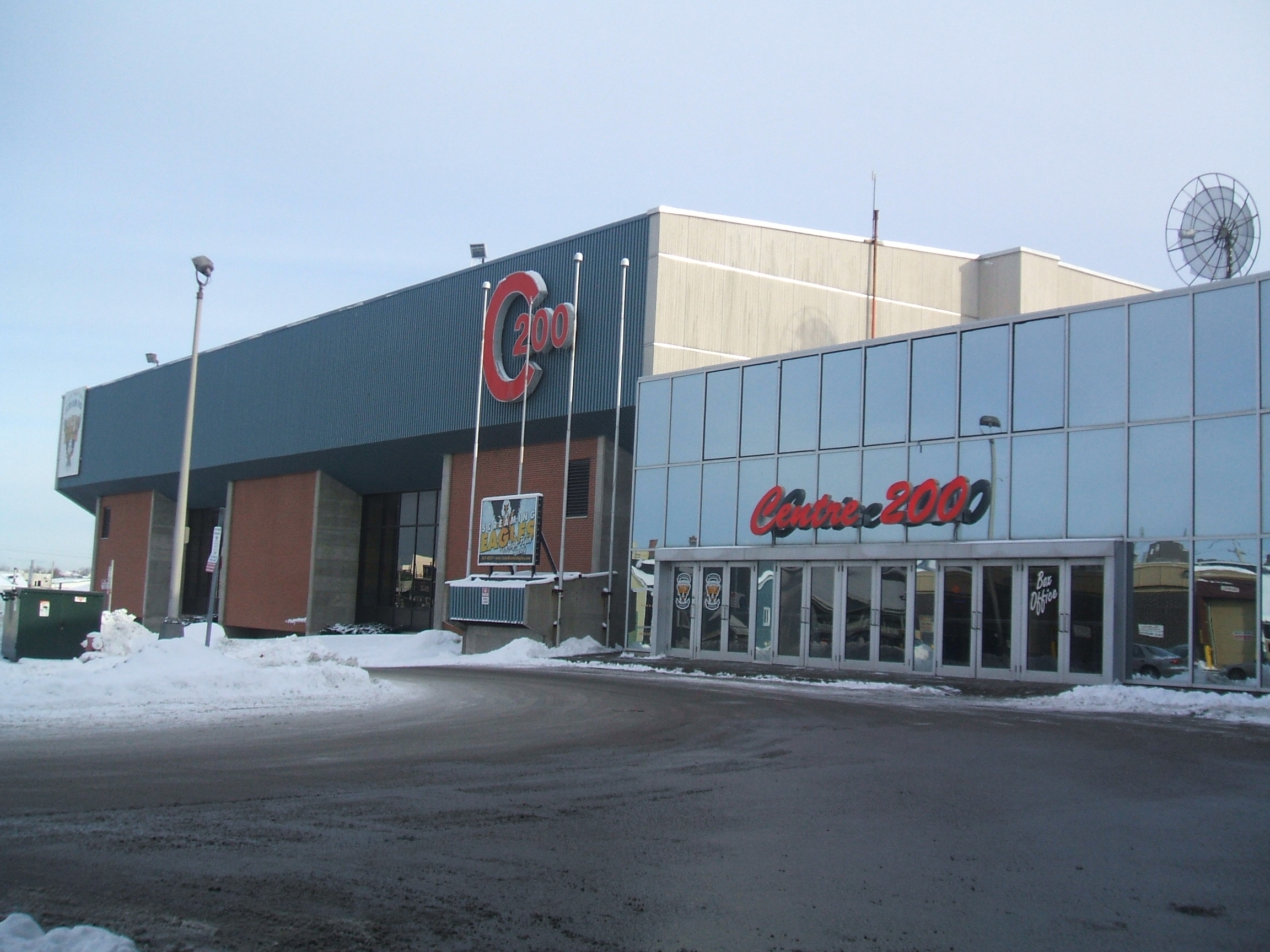
Centre 200 in Sydney, Nova Scotia

The franchise was originally granted to the Sorel Éperviers (Black Hawks) for the 1969–70 season. They then moved from Sorel to Verdun in 1977 to become the Verdun Éperviers. In 1979, they played in both Sorel and Verdun before moving back to Sorel for the next season. In 1981, they moved to Granby to become the Granby Bisons, and in 1995 changed their names to the Granby Prédateurs. In 1996, the Prédateurs won the Memorial Cup. In 1997, the franchise was relocated to Sydney to become the Cape Breton Screaming Eagles. Prior to the Eagles' arrival, Sydney played host to the American Hockey League (AHL)'s Cape Breton Oilers from 1988 to 1996.

=== Early years in Cape Breton (1997–1999) ===
The Screaming Eagles' first captain was Daniel Payette under coach Dany Dubé.

=== The Vincent era (1999–2008) ===
In 1999, Pascal Vincent was promoted as the new head coach following the dismissal of Bruce Campbell. The Screaming Eagles attempted to strengthen the club by drafting future National Hockey League (NHL) star Ilya Kovalchuk tenth overall in the 2000 CHL Import Draft. However, Kovalchuk declined to report to the team. Along with star players Marc-André Fleury, Dominic Noel, Stuart MacRae and Stephen Dixon, the Screaming Eagles reached the QMJHL's conference final in 2002, only to lose in five games to Acadie-Bathurst Titan. Fleury's number 29 jersey went on to be retired by the Screaming Eagles in 2008. Kovalchuk's number 71 was retired in 2014, as an April Fools' Day prank.

Vincent stacked the Screaming Eagles lineup with many NHL prospects for the 2003–04 season in hopes of bringing a league title to Cape Breton. After the Screaming Eagles won 49 games and captured a division title, with Fleury also returning from the Pittsburgh Penguins before the playoffs, but the Screaming Eagles lost in the second round to the Chicoutimi Saguenéens.

At the 2004 QMJHL Draft, the Screaming Eagles chose James Sheppard with the first overall pick. In 2006–07, along with star players Luc Bourdon, Ondrej Pavelec and Oskars Bartulis, Sheppard led the Screaming Eagles to the league semifinals, only to lose in seven games to the Val-d'Or Foreurs.

The 2007–08 season saw 16-year-old goaltender Olivier Roy rise to prominence. The Screaming Eagles finished fourth in their division and won their first round playoff series despite having a roster that normally dressed at least ten rookies. Vincent went on to be named the 2008 QMJHL Coach of the Year. Following the end of the season, Vincent became the head coach and general manager of the Montreal Junior Hockey Club.

=== 2010s history (2008–2019) ===
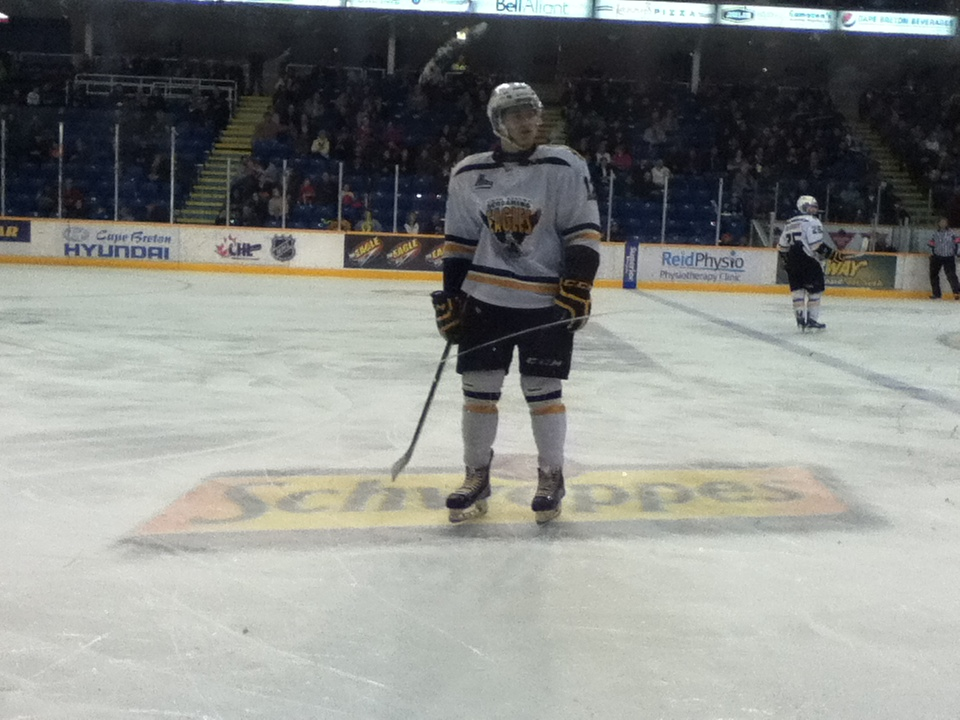
The team returned to the playoffs in 2014.

Following Vincent's departure, assistant coach Mario Durocher took over the role of head coach and general manager. In a bid to host the Memorial Cup in 2012, Durocher added former NHL players Mike McPhee and Guy Chouinard, former NHL coach Pierre Creamer and Michel Boucher to the hockey staff in consulting roles in 2010. Durocher was relieved of his duties on April 12, 2011, after a lackluster season in which the team finished 16th in the league and last in the Atlantic Division with just 41 points.

The team's then-head coach Ron Choules replaced Durocher as general manager in April 2011, though the team failed to improve on the ice. After a poor start to the 2012–13 season, Choules himself was fired on December 3, 2012, with former Val-d'Or head coach Marc-André Dumont announced as his replacement. The Screaming Eagles failed to reach the playoffs for the first time in franchise history in the 2012–13 season. At season's end, assistant coach Jean-François David was fired.

After being eliminated in the second round of the 2019 playoffs, the Screaming Eagles fired their coaching staff. Dumont was replaced with Nova Scotia native, Jake Grimes, along with former Eagles alumni Chris Culligan as assistant coach.

The team mascot is an eagle named Screech.

=== Cape Breton Eagles (2019–present) ===
On August 14, 2019, the team rebranded itself as the Cape Breton Eagles.

On November 30, 2021, head coach Jake Grimes resigned as head coach citing personal reasons. He finished with a winning record overall with the club, at 46–34–0–7 record over one-and-a-half seasons but had started the 2021–22 season with a 6–14–0–4 record. The Eagles spent approximately two months with an interim head coach before hiring Chadd Cassidy on January 7, 2022.

== Players ==
=== Retired numbers ===
- 7 Chris Culligan (Cape Breton Screaming Eagles, 2004–2009)
- 29 Marc-André Fleury (Cape Breton Screaming Eagles, 2000–2004)

=== NHL alumni ===
The following players have played in at least one National Hockey League (NHL) game as of the 2023-24 season:

- Luke Adam
- Mark Barberio
- Oskars Bartulis
- Drake Batherson
- Clark Bishop
- Luc Bourdon
- William Carrier
- Jean-Philippe Côté
- Pierre-Luc Dubois
- Giovanni Fiore
- Marc-André Fleury
- Ryan Flinn
- Martin Houle
- Raman Hrabarenka
- Ivan Ivan
- Tomas Kloucek
- Maxime Lagacé
- Guillaume Lefebvre
- Kevin Mandolese
- Adam Pardy
- Ondrej Pavelec
- Alexandre R. Picard
- Tim Ramholt
- Logan Shaw
- James Sheppard
- Egor Sokolov
- Evgeny Svechnikov

=== NHL first round draft picks ===
List of first round selections in the NHL entry draft:

Year	#	Player	Nationality	NHL team
2003	1	Marc-André Fleury (G)	Canada	Pittsburgh Penguins
2006	9	James Sheppard (C)	Canada	Minnesota Wild
2015	19	Evgeny Svechnikov (LW)	Russia	Detroit Red Wings
2016	3	Pierre-Luc Dubois (C)	Canada	Columbus Blue Jackets

== Award winners ==
List of award winners:

CHL Scholastic Player of the Year

- 2007–08: Robert Slaney

QMJHL Humanitarian of the Year

- 2009–10: Nick MacNeil
- 2022–23: Cam Squires

Jacques Plante Memorial Trophy

- 2003–04: Martin Houle (2.32)
- 2005–06: Ondrej Pavelec (2.51)
- 2006–07: Ondrej Pavelec (2.52)

Kevin Lowe Trophy

- 2019–20: Adam McCormick

Luc Robitaille Trophy

- 2006–07: Cape Breton (308)

Marcel Robert Trophy

- 2004–05: Guillaume Demers
- 2007–08: Robert Slaney

Maurice Filion Trophy

- 2006–07: Pascal Vincent

Mike Bossy Trophy

- 2002–03: Marc-André Fleury

Philips Plaque

- 2001–02: Pierre-Luc Emond

Raymond Lagacé Trophy

- 2005–06: Ondrej Pavelec
- 2007–08: Olivier Roy

RDS Cup

- 2005–06: Ondrej Pavelec
- 2007–08: Olivier Roy

Robert Lebel Trophy

- 2003–04: Cape Breton (2.33)

Ron Lapointe Trophy

- 2007–08: Pascal Vincent

Telus Cup – Defensive

- 2002–03: Marc-André Fleury
- 2004–05: Martin Houle

== Season-by-season results ==
=== Regular season ===
QMJHL season standings.
OTL = Overtime loss, SL = Shootout loss

Season	Games	Won	Lost	Tied	OL	SL	Points	Pct	Goals for	Goals against	Standing
1997–98	70	19	46	5	—	—	43	0.307	211	295	6th, Dilio
1998–99	70	22	44	4	—	—	48	0.343	226	272	6th, Dilio
1999–00	72	24	39	3	6	—	57	0.396	230	302	3rd, Maritimes
2000–01	72	30	37	4	1	—	65	0.451	270	292	2nd, Maritimes
2001–02	72	38	20	10	4	—	90	0.625	286	224	3rd, Maritimes
2002–03	72	21	37	9	5	—	56	0.389	200	268	4th, Maritimes
2003–04	70	49	16	2	3	—	103	0.736	273	164	1st, Atlantic
2004–05	70	32	27	8	3	—	75	0.536	206	195	3rd, Atlantic
2005–06	70	40	23	—	3	4	87	0.621	236	206	3rd, Eastern
2006–07	70	46	22	—	2	0	94	0.671	308	200	2nd, Eastern
2007–08	70	40	24	—	3	3	86	0.614	242	230	4th, Eastern
2008–09	68	46	18	—	3	1	96	0.676	252	201	2nd, Atlantic
2009–10	68	41	22	—	2	3	87	0.603	238	185	3rd, Atlantic
2010–11	68	18	45	—	1	4	41	0.301	154	246	5th, Maritimes
2011–12	68	23	42	—	1	2	49	0.360	219	306	5th, Maritimes
2012–13	68	14	46	—	3	5	36	0.265	161	308	6th, Telus Maritimes
2013–14	68	37	27	—	1	3	78	0.574	260	260	2nd, Telus Maritimes
2014–15	68	31	31	—	3	3	68	0.500	258	246	5th, Maritimes
2015–16	68	38	24	—	5	1	82	0.603	286	237	3rd, Maritimes
2016–17	68	39	25	—	2	2	82	0.603	270	230	4th, Maritimes
2017–18	68	32	28	—	6	2	72	0.529	235	259	4th, Maritimes
2018–19	68	40	22	—	1	5	86	0.632	267	214	3rd, Maritimes
2019–20	63	40	20	—	2	1	83	0.659	269	194	2nd, Maritimes
2020–21	38	12	25	—	1	0	25	0.329	113	186	6th, Maritimes
2021–22	68	14	47	—	4	3	35	0.257	183	335	6th, Maritimes
2022–23	68	30	34	—	3	1	64	0.471	224	275	3rd, Maritimes
2023–24	68	39	26	—	1	2	81	0.596	216	194	3rd, Maritimes
2024–25	64	34	23	—	4	3	75	0.586	212	195	2nd, Maritimes
2025–26	64	28	23	—	4	9	69	0.539	171	198	6th, Eastern Conference

=== Playoffs ===
Season	1st round	2nd round	3rd round	Finals
1997–98	L, 0–4, Quebec	–	–	–
1998–99	L, 1–4, Acadie–Bathurst	–	–	–
1999–2000	L, 0–4, Quebec	–	–	–
2000–01	W, 4–3, Chicoutimi	L, 1–4, Acadie–Bathurst	–	–
2001–02	W, 4–1, Baie-Comeau	W, 4–2, Halifax	L, 1–4, Acadie–Bathurst	–
2002–03	L, 0–4, Halifax	–	–	–
2003–04	Bye	L, 1–4, Chicoutimi	–	–
2004–05	L, 1–4, Gatineau	–	–	–
2005–06	W, 4–1, St. John's	L, 0–4, Acadie–Bathurst	–	–
2006–07	W, 4–0, St. John's	W, 4–1, Acadie–Bathurst	L, 3–4, Val-d'Or	–
2007–08	W, 4–2, Lewiston	L, 1–4, Halifax	–	–
2008–09	W, 4–0, Saint John	L, 3–4, Quebec	–	–
2009–10	L, 1–4, Moncton	–	–	–
2010–11	L, 0–4, Saint John	–	–	–
2011–12	L, 0–4, Saint John	–	–	–
2012–13	Did not qualify			
2013–14	L, 0–4, Gatineau	–	–	–
2014–15	L, 3–4, Quebec	–	–	–
2015–16	W, 4–2, Chicoutimi	L, 3–4, Saint John	–	–
2016–17	W, 4–3, Gatineau	L, 0–4, Charlottetown	–	–
2017–18	L, 1–4, Drummondville	–	–	–
2018–19	W, 4–2, Charlottetown	L, 1–4, Rimouski	–	–
2019–20	QMJHL playoffs cancelled due to ongoing COVID-19 pandemic			
2020–21	Did not qualify^{1}			
2021–22	Did not qualify			
2022–23	L, 0–4, Halifax	–	–	–
2023–24	W, 4–1, Rimouski	W, 4–0, Chicoutimi	L, 1–4, Baie-Comeau	–
2024–25	L, 2–4, Baie-Comeau	–	–	–
2025–26	L, 2–4, Newfoundland	–	–	–

^{1} Due to local travel restrictions, all Nova Scotia-based teams were deemed ineligible to compete in the playoffs. Three New Brunswick-based teams competed in a six-game round-robin tournament to determine who would face the Charlottetown Islanders in the Maritimes Division final.

== See also ==
- List of ice hockey teams in Nova Scotia
