= Alain Langlais =

Canadian ice hockey player (born 1950)

- Born: October 9, 1950 (age 74); Chicoutimi, Quebec, Canada
- Height: 5 ft 10 in (178 cm)
- Weight: 187 lb (85 kg; 13 st 5 lb)
- Position: Right wing
- Shot: Right
- Played for: Minnesota North Stars
- Playing career: 1968–1980

Joseph Alfred Langlais (born October 9, 1950) is a Canadian former professional ice hockey player who played 25 games in the National Hockey League with the Minnesota North Stars between 1974 and 1975. The rest of his career, which lasted from 1970 to 1980, was spent in various minor leagues. As a youth, he played in the 1963 Quebec International Pee-Wee Hockey Tournament with a minor ice hockey team from Lévis, Quebec.

== Career statistics ==
=== Regular season and playoffs ===
			Regular season					Playoffs
Season	Team	League	GP	G	A	Pts	PIM	GP	G	A	Pts	PIM
1968–69	Sorel Black Hawks	MMHL	—	—	—	—	—	—	—	—	—	—
1968–69	Sorel Black Hawks	M-Cup	—	—	—	—	—	4	0	0	0	10
1969–70	Sorel Eperviers	QMJHL	49	60	51	111	105	10	7	6	13	22
1970–71	Long Island Ducks	EHL	—	—	—	—	—	—	—	—	—	—
1970–71	Jersey Devils	EHL	—	—	—	—	—	—	—	—	—	—
1970–71	Toledo Hornets	IHL	31	8	8	16	50	—	—	—	—	—
1971–72	Long Island Ducks	EHL	75	45	31	76	125	—	—	—	—	—
1972–73	Chicoutimi Sagueneens	QSHL	—	—	—	—	—	—	—	—	—	—
1973–74	Minnesota North Stars	NHL	14	3	3	6	8	—	—	—	—	—
1973–74	New Haven Nighthawks	AHL	45	21	16	37	73	10	6	3	9	9
1973–74	Saginaw Gears	IHL	11	3	3	6	14	—	—	—	—	—
1974–75	Minnesota North Stars	NHL	11	1	1	2	2	—	—	—	—	—
1974–75	New Haven Nighthawks	AHL	66	41	29	70	109	12	7	6	13	23
1975–76	New Haven Nighthawks	AHL	53	14	17	31	34	—	—	—	—	—
1975–76	Richmond Robins	AHL	21	7	11	18	27	8	1	0	1	10
1976–77	Tulsa Oilers	CHL	68	13	22	35	71	9	4	4	8	9
1976–77	New Haven Nighthawks	AHL	4	0	0	0	4	—	—	—	—	—
1977–78	Chicoutimi Comets	QIPHL	—	—	—	—	—	—	—	—	—	—
1978–79	Chicoutimi Comets	QIPHL	—	—	—	—	—	—	—	—	—	—
1979–80	Flint Generals	IHL	17	4	2	6	21	—	—	—	—	—
AHL totals			189	83	73	156	247	30	14	9	23	42
NHL totals			25	4	4	8	10	—	—	—	—	—
