= Gary MacGregor =

Canadian ice hockey player

- Born: September 21, 1954 Kingston, Ontario, Canada
- Died: April 20, 1995 (aged 40) Kingston, Ontario, Canada
- Height: 5 ft 9 in (175 cm)
- Weight: 170 lb (77 kg; 12 st 2 lb)
- Position: Centre
- Shot: Left
- Played for: Chicago Cougars; Denver Spurs; Ottawa Civics; Cleveland Crusaders; New England Whalers; Indianapolis Racers; Edmonton Oilers
- NHL draft: 30th overall, 1974; Montreal Canadiens
- WHA draft: 10th overall, 1974; Chicago Cougars
- Playing career: 1974–1982

Gary MacGregor (born September 21, 1954 – April 20, 1995) was a Canadian ice hockey forward.

== Early life ==
MacGregor was born in Kingston, Ontario. During his final season of junior hockey with the Cornwall Royals in 1973–74, MacGregor scored 100 goals.

== Career ==
MacGregor was drafted by both the National Hockey League (NHL) and World Hockey Association (WHA) in 1974 and chose the WHA. He had a superb rookie season in 1974–75 with the Chicago Cougars, averaging nearly one point per game. But his productivity dropped sharply for the remainder of his pro career with the Cougars, Denver Spurs, Ottawa Civics, Cleveland Crusaders, New England Whalers, Indianapolis Racers, and Edmonton Oilers. MacGregor also played in Europe.

== Personal life ==
MacGregor died at his home in Kingston, Ontario, of a heart attack at the age of 40. He was inducted posthumously into the Kingston and District Sports Hall of Fame.

== Career statistics ==
			Regular season					Playoffs
Season	Team	League	GP	G	A	Pts	PIM	GP	G	A	Pts	PIM
1971–72	Cornwall Royals	QMJHL	60	39	28	67	13	16	5	4	9	25
1972–73	Cornwall Royals	QMJHL	45	43	24	67	14	16	26	9	35	4
1973–74	Cornwall Royals	QMJHL	66	100	74	174	76	5	3	2	5	11
1974–75	Chicago Cougars	WHA	78	42	34	76	26	—	—	—	—	—
1975–76	Denver Spurs/Ottawa Civics	WHA	38	16	14	30	18	—	—	—	—	—
1975–76	Cleveland Crusaders	WHA	35	5	3	8	6	3	0	0	0	4
1976–77	New England Whalers	WHA	30	8	8	16	4	—	—	—	—	—
1976–77	Indianapolis Racers	WHA	16	0	5	5	4	—	—	—	—	—
1977–78	Edmonton Oilers	WHA	37	11	2	13	29	—	—	—	—	—
1977–78	Spokane Flyers	WIHL	—	8	1	9	4	—	—	—	—	—
1978–79	Indianapolis Racers	WHA	17	8	4	12	0	—	—	—	—	—
1980–81	Springfield Indians	AHL	46	11	10	21	4	—	—	—	—	—
1981–82	Mannheimer ERC	1.GBun	20	10	3	13	8	8	2	1	3	2
WHA totals			251	90	70	160	87	3	0	0	0	4
