= Chadd Cassidy =

American ice hockey coach

- Born: August 3, 1973 (age 51); Lake Placid, New York, U.S.
- Position: Head coach
- Played for: Rochester Americans
- Playing career: 1999–present

Chadd Cassidy (born August 3, 1973) is an American professional ice hockey coach and former head coach of the Cape Breton Eagles in the Quebec Major Junior Hockey League.

Cassidy played varsity hockey at the State University of New York at Cortland, graduating in 1995 with a degree in recreation and leisure studies. He served as an assistant coach at Cortland State from 1999 to 2001, and then at the State University of New York at Potsdam for the 2001–02 season. His next stop was with the National Sports Academy in Lake Placid, New York, where he was the head coach from 2002 to 2006, with his team winning the league championship in 2004. Next, Cassidy was an assistant coach under Ron Rolston with the U.S. National Under-18 Team from 2006 to 2011.

On August 31, 2011, Cassidy joined the Rochester Americans as an assistant coach, and on February 20, 2013, he took over as head coach when Ron Rolston was promoted to coach the Buffalo Sabres. He was relieved of his duties as head coach on May 1, 2015.

He served as head coach at Northwood School in Lake Placid, New York, from 2015 to 2021. In July 2021, he was named head coach of the Omaha Lancers in the United States Hockey League, but he resigned just four months later in November due to concerns over the team's operations, including budget cuts and player welfare, which later sparked a player boycott and league investigation.

On January 7, 2022, Cassidy was officially appointed as the head coach of the Cape Breton Eagles, and the eighth head coach in the franchise's history in Cape Breton.
