= Jean Bernier =

Canadian ice hockey player

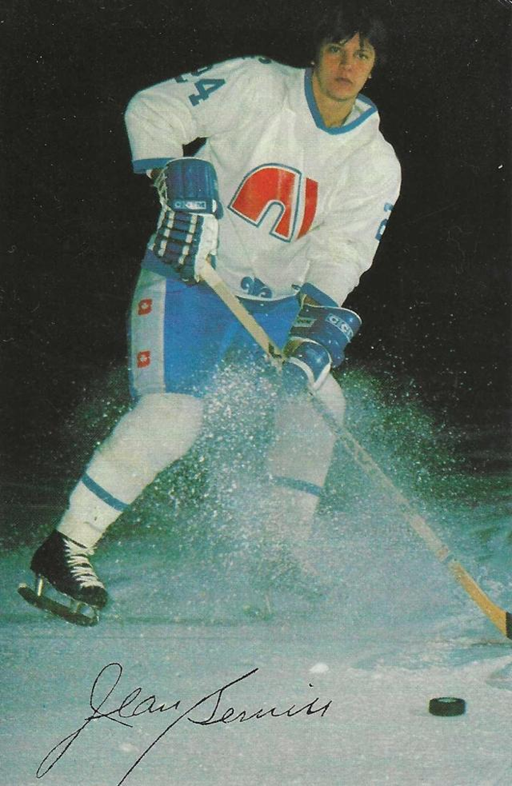
- Bernier in 1976 postcard
- Born: July 21, 1954 (age 71) Saint-Hyacinthe, Quebec, Canada
- Height: 5 ft 10 in (178 cm)
- Weight: 170 lb (77 kg; 12 st 2 lb)
- Position: Defence
- Shot: Left
- Played for: Quebec Nordiques (WHA)
- NHL draft: 188th overall, 1974; Chicago Black Hawks
- WHA draft: 54th overall, 1974; Quebec Nordiques
- Playing career: 1974–1981

Jean Bernier (born July 21, 1954) is a retired professional ice hockey player who played 260 games in the World Hockey Association, for the Quebec Nordiques. He was born in Saint-Hyacinthe, Quebec. As a youth, he played in the 1966 and 1967 Quebec International Pee-Wee Hockey Tournaments with a minor ice hockey team from Saint-Hyacinthe.

== Career statistics ==
			Regular season					Playoffs
Season	Team	League	GP	G	A	Pts	PIM	GP	G	A	Pts	PIM
1970–71	Shawinigan Bruins	QMJHL	—	—	—	—	—	8	0	3	3	2
1971–72	Shawinigan Bruins	QMJHL	61	4	37	41	25	9	4	7	11	0
1972–73	Shawinigan Bruins	QMJHL	64	18	42	60	13	4	0	1	1	0
1973–74	Shawinigan Dynamos	QMJHL	61	14	55	69	36	4	1	2	3	0
1974–75	Maine Nordiques	NAHL-Sr.	33	9	14	23	16	—	—	—	—	—
1974–75	Quebec Nordiques	WHA	34	1	13	14	13	9	0	1	1	2
1975–76	Quebec Nordiques	WHA	80	4	26	30	10	4	0	1	1	0
1976–77	Quebec Nordiques	WHA	72	2	13	15	23	9	0	2	2	0
1977–78	Quebec Nordiques	WHA	74	10	32	42	4	10	3	4	7	2
1978–79	Tulsa Oilers	CHL	60	3	23	26	18	—	—	—	—	—
1979–80	EV Zug	NLB	27	9	10	19	—	—	—	—	—	—
1980–81	EV Zug	NLB	32	16	16	32	—	—	—	—	—	—
1984–85	HC Ascona	SwissDiv1	—	—	—	—	—	—	—	—	—	—
WHA totals			260	17	84	101	50	32	3	8	11	4
