= 1973–74 QMJHL season =

Canadian junior ice hockey season

The 1973–74 QMJHL season was the fifth season in the history of the Quebec Major Junior Hockey League. East and west divisions resumed with the addition of two new teams, the Hull Festivals and Chicoutimi Saguenéens. Eleven teams played 70 games each in the schedule, up from the 64 games the previous season.

The season sparked an offensive explosion, unmatched in Canadian Hockey League history. The Sorel Éperviers finished first overall in the regular season, and set a CHL record of 620 goals scored as a team. Three Sorel players, Pierre Larouche, Michel Deziel and Jacques Cossette, had more than 90 goals and 200 points each. Sorel goalkeeper Claude Legris won the top goaltender award, despite posting a 4.50 goals against average; the highest GAA of any Jacques Plante Memorial Trophy winner to date.

Pierre Larouche set a Canadian junior ice hockey record scoring record for most points scored in a season with 251, that lasted until the 1983–84 QMJHL season when broken by Mario Lemieux. Three different players, Mike Bossy, Alain Daigle and Bob Sirois each scored 70 goals or more in the season, yet none were in the top ten league scoring leaders.

The Quebec Remparts finished second place in the regular season despite scoring 531 goals as a team, the second highest in CHL history. Quebec won the President's Cup, defeating the first place Sorel Éperviers in the finals.

== Team changes ==
- The Shawinigan Bruins are renamed the Shawinigan Dynamos.
- The Trois-Rivières Ducs are renamed the Trois-Rivières Draveurs.
- The Chicoutimi Saguenéens join the league as an expansion franchise.
- The Hull Festivals join the league as an expansion franchise.

== Final standings ==
Note: GP = Games played; W = Wins; L = Losses; T = Ties; Pts = Points; GF = Goals for; GA = Goals against

| East Division | GP | W | L | T | Pts | GF | GA |
|---|---|---|---|---|---|---|---|
| Sorel Éperviers | 70 | 58 | 11 | 1 | 117 | 620 | 301 |
| Quebec Remparts | 70 | 52 | 16 | 2 | 106 | 531 | 314 |
| Shawinigan Dynamos | 70 | 30 | 37 | 3 | 63 | 347 | 402 |
| Trois-Rivières Draveurs | 70 | 22 | 47 | 1 | 45 | 310 | 449 |
| Chicoutimi Saguenéens | 70 | 21 | 49 | 0 | 42 | 269 | 457 |

| West Division | GP | W | L | T | Pts | GF | GA |
|---|---|---|---|---|---|---|---|
| Cornwall Royals | 70 | 46 | 22 | 2 | 94 | 438 | 328 |
| Montreal Bleu Blanc Rouge | 70 | 43 | 24 | 3 | 89 | 443 | 320 |
| Sherbrooke Castors | 70 | 37 | 32 | 1 | 75 | 333 | 340 |
| Laval National | 70 | 30 | 37 | 3 | 63 | 362 | 425 |
| Drummondville Rangers | 70 | 23 | 46 | 1 | 47 | 286 | 424 |
| Hull Festivals | 70 | 14 | 55 | 1 | 29 | 226 | 405 |

- complete list of standings.

== Scoring leaders ==
Note: GP = Games played; G = Goals; A = Assists; Pts = Points; PIM = Penalties in Minutes

| Player | Team | GP | G | A | Pts | PIM |
|---|---|---|---|---|---|---|
| Pierre Larouche | Sorel Éperviers | 67 | 94 | 157 | 251 | 53 |
| Michel Deziel | Sorel Éperviers | 69 | 92 | 135 | 227 | 69 |
| Real Cloutier | Quebec Remparts | 69 | 93 | 123 | 216 | 40 |
| Jacques Cossette | Sorel Éperviers | 68 | 97 | 117 | 214 | 217 |
| Jacques Locas | Quebec Remparts | 63 | 99 | 107 | 206 | 87 |
| Rich Nantais | Quebec Remparts | 67 | 64 | 130 | 194 | 213 |
| Gary MacGregor | Cornwall Royals | 66 | 100 | 74 | 174 | 76 |
| Guy Chouinard | Quebec Remparts | 62 | 75 | 85 | 160 | 22 |
| Marcel Dumais | Sherbrooke Castors | 67 | 59 | 101 | 160 | 73 |
| Kevin Treacy | Cornwall Royals | 69 | 51 | 105 | 156 | 57 |

- complete scoring statistics

== Playoffs ==
Jacques Locas was the leading scorer of the playoffs with 51 points (18 goals, 33 assists).

Quarterfinals

- Sorel Éperviers defeated Trois-Rivières Draveurs 4 games to 0.
- Quebec Remparts defeated Shawinigan Dynamos 4 games to 0.
- Laval National defeated Cornwall Royals 4 games to 1.
- Montreal Bleu Blanc Rouge defeated Sherbrooke Castors 4 games to 1.

Semifinals

- Sorel Éperviers defeated Montreal Bleu Blanc Rouge 4 games to 0.
- Quebec Remparts defeated Laval National 4 games to 2.

Finals

- Quebec Remparts defeated Sorel Éperviers 4 games to 2.

== All-star teams ==
First team

- Goaltender – Bob Sauve, Laval National
- Left defence – Denis Carufel, Sorel Éperviers
- Right defence – Bob Murray, Cornwall Royals
- Left winger – Michel Deziel, Sorel Éperviers
- Centreman – Gary MacGregor, Cornwall Royals
- Right winger – Jacques Cossette, Sorel Éperviers
- Coach – Ghislain Delage, Sherbrooke Castors

Second team

- Goaltender – Andre Lepage, Drummondville Rangers
- Left defence – Jean Bernier, Shawinigan Bruins
- Right defence – Richard Mulhern, Sherbrooke Castors
- Left winger – Claude Larose, Drummondville Rangers
- Centreman – Pierre Larouche, Sorel Éperviers
- Right winger – Real Cloutier, Quebec Remparts
- Coach – Ron Racette, Cornwall Royals
- List of First/Second/Rookie team all-stars.

== Trophies and awards ==
Team

- President's Cup – Playoff Champions, Quebec Remparts
- Jean Rougeau Trophy – Regular Season Champions, Sorel Éperviers

Player

- Michel Brière Memorial Trophy – Most Valuable Player, Gary MacGregor, Cornwall Royals
- Jean Béliveau Trophy – Top Scorer, Pierre Larouche, Sorel Éperviers
- Jacques Plante Memorial Trophy – Best GAA, Claude Legris, Sorel Éperviers
- Michel Bergeron Trophy – Rookie of the Year, Mike Bossy, Laval National
- Frank J. Selke Memorial Trophy – Most sportsmanlike player, Gary MacGregor, Cornwall Royals

== See also ==
- 1974 Memorial Cup
- 1974 NHL entry draft
- 1973–74 OHA season
- 1973–74 WCHL season

| Preceded by 1972–73 QMJHL season | QMJHL seasons | Succeeded by 1974–75 QMJHL season |
