= Jacques Plante Memorial Trophy =

The Jacques Plante Memorial Trophy is awarded annually to the goaltender in the Quebec Maritimes Junior Hockey League (QMJHL) with the best goals-against average. It is named for Hockey Hall of Fame goaltender Jacques Plante.

Prior to the creation of the Patrick Roy Trophy for the 2023–24 season, the recipient of the Plante Trophy was the QMJHL's finalist for the CHL Goaltender of the Year award.

== Winners ==
Season	Goaltender	Team	Average
1969–70	Michel Deguise	Sorel Éperviers	3.99
1970–71	Raynald Fortier	Quebec Remparts	3.39
1971–72	Richard Brodeur	Cornwall Royals	2.93
1972–73	Pierre Pérusse	Quebec Remparts	3.78
1973–74	Claude Legris	Sorel Éperviers	4.50
1974–75	Nick Sanza	Sherbrooke Castors	3.51
1975–76	Tim Bernhardt	Cornwall Royals	3.92
1976–77	Tim Bernhardt	Cornwall Royals	3.63
1977–78	Tim Bernhardt	Cornwall Royals	3.39
1978–79	Jacques Cloutier	Trois-Rivières Draveurs	3.14
1979–80	Corrado Micalef	Sherbrooke Castors	4.20
1980–81	Michel Dufour	Sorel Éperviers	3.64
1981–82	Jeff Barratt	Montreal Juniors	3.50
1982–83	Tony Haladuick	Laval Voisins	4.39
1983–84	Tony Haladuick	Laval Voisins	3.79
1984–85	Daniel Berthiaume	Chicoutimi Saguenéens	3.85
1985–86	Robert Desjardins	Hull Olympiques	3.32
1986–87	Robert Desjardins	Longueuil Chevaliers	3.25
1987–88	Stéphane Beauregard	Saint-Jean Castors	3.65
1988–89	Stéphane Fiset	Victoriaville Tigres	3.45
1989–90	Pierre Gagnon	Victoriaville Tigres	3.02
1990–91	Félix Potvin	Chicoutimi Saguenéens	2.70
1991–92	Jean-François Labbé	Trois-Rivières Draveurs	3.10
1992–93	Jocelyn Thibault	Sherbrooke Faucons	2.99
1993–94	Philippe DeRouville	Verdun Collège Français	3.06
1994–95	Martin Biron	Beauport Harfangs	2.48
1995–96	Frederic Deschênes	Granby Prédateurs	2.63
1996–97	Marc Denis	Chicoutimi Saguenéens	2.69
1997–98	Mathieu Garon	Victoriaville Tigres	2.68
1998–99	Maxime Ouellet	Quebec Remparts	2.70
1999–2000	Simon Lajeunesse	Moncton Wildcats	2.61
2000–01	Frédéric Cloutier	Shawinigan Cataractes	2.50
2001–02	Olivier Michaud	Shawinigan Cataractes	2.45
2002–03	Adam Russo	Acadie–Bathurst Titan	2.41
2003–04	Martin Houle	Cape Breton Screaming Eagles	2.32
2004–05	Julien Ellis	Shawinigan Cataractes	2.41
2005–06	Ondrej Pavelec	Cape Breton Screaming Eagles	2.51
2006–07	Ondrej Pavelec	Cape Breton Screaming Eagles	2.52
2007–08	Bobby Nadeau	Chicoutimi Saguenéens	2.63
2008–09	Nicola Riopel	Moncton Wildcats	2.01
2009–10	Jake Allen	Drummondville Voltigeurs	2.20
2010–11	Jacob De Serres	Saint John Sea Dogs	2.22
2011–12	Mathieu Corbeil-Thériault	Saint John Sea Dogs	2.38
2012–13	Étienne Marcoux	Blainville-Boisbriand Armada	2.14
2013–14	Zachary Fucale	Halifax Mooseheads	2.26
2014–15	Philippe Desrosiers	Rimouski Océanic	2.50
2015–16	Chase Marchand	Rouyn-Noranda Huskies	2.42
2016–17	Francis Leclerc	Blainville-Boisbriand Armada	2.31
2017–18	Samuel Harvey	Rouyn-Noranda Huskies	2.10
2018–19	Samuel Harvey	Rouyn-Noranda Huskies	2.08
2019–20	Samuel Hlavaj	Sherbrooke Phoenix	2.25
2020–21	Colten Ellis	Charlottetown Islanders	1.78
2021–22	Charles-Antoine Lavallée	Shawinigan Cataractes	2.40
2022–23	William Rousseau	Quebec Remparts	2.22
2023–24	William Rousseau	Rouyn-Noranda Huskies	2.24
2024–25	William Lacelle	Rimouski Océanic	2.38
2025–26	Rudy Guimond	Moncton Wildcats	2.27
