= Legris =

Legris is a surname. Notable people with the surname include:

- Claude Legris (born 1956), Canadian ice hockey player
- Jonathan Legris (born 1987), British racing driver
- Joseph-Hormisdas Legris (1850–1932), Canadian politician
- Manuel Legris (born 1964), French ballet dancer
- Roger Legris (1898–1981), French actor
- Sylvia Legris (born 1960), Canadian poet
