= Martin Houle =

Canadian ice hockey player

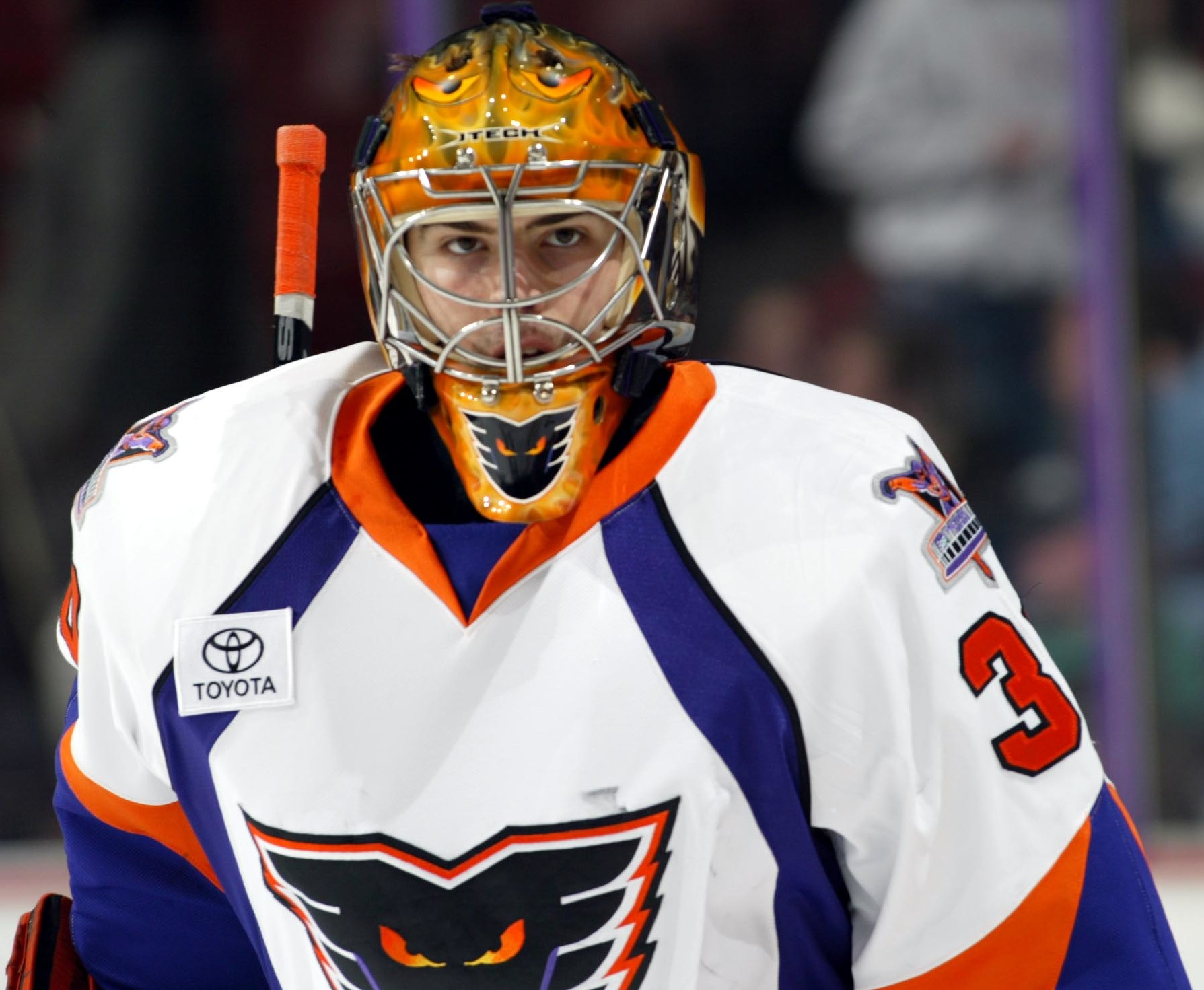
- Houle with the Philadelphia Phantoms in 2008
- Born: February 12, 1985 (age 41) Montreal, Quebec, Canada
- Height: 5 ft 11 in (180 cm)
- Weight: 170 lb (77 kg; 12 st 2 lb)
- Position: Goaltender
- Caught: Left
- Played for: Philadelphia Flyers
- NHL draft: 232nd overall, 2004; Philadelphia Flyers
- Playing career: 2005–2011

Martin G. Houle (born February 12, 1985) is a Canadian former professional ice hockey goaltender who played in one game in the National Hockey League (NHL) for the Philadelphia Flyers during the 2006–07 season.

== Playing career ==
As a youth, Houle played in the 1999 Quebec International Pee-Wee Hockey Tournament with the Richelieu Éclaireurs minor ice hockey team.

Houle played junior ice hockey for the Cape Breton Screaming Eagles of the Quebec Major Junior Hockey League from 2001 to 2005. He ended the 2003-04 season ranked second in the league with 34 wins and a 2.32 GAA. He was awarded the Jacques Plante Memorial Trophy as the QMJHL goaltender of the year, named a QMJHL first-team all-star, and a Canadian Hockey League second-team all-star. House was drafted by the Philadelphia Flyers 232nd overall in the 2004 NHL entry draft. He was named the QMJHL Defensive Player of the Year, and finished 7th in the QMJHL in wins (26) and 5th in GAA (2.51).

Following his senior season in the QMJHL, he attended Flyers training camp, but was reassigned to the Trenton Titans of the ECHL at the close of the Philadelphia Phantoms training camp. Houle had played seven straight games for the Titans after Scott Stirling was traded to the San Antonio Rampage. In those seven games, he managed to put together the sixth best goals against average in the ECHL.

The Phantoms liked what they saw in him and decided to switch him with Rejean Beauchemin, who was struggling early in the season. At the AHL level, Houle excelled. However, the test truly came when Jamie Storr was called up to be backup goalie for Antero Niittymäki while Robert Esche was on the injury list. With Storr in the National Hockey League, Houle became the starting goalie and retained this for the rest of the season.

Scheduled to be a restricted free agent following the 2007-08 season, Houle became an unrestricted free agent when the Flyers didn't extend him a qualifying offer. Houle eventually signed with the ECHL's Las Vegas Wranglers, but after three games and recording a 1-2-0 record with a 3.03 GAA, Houle was traded to the Cincinnati Cyclones.

== Career statistics ==
=== Regular season and playoffs ===
			Regular season										Playoffs
Season	Team	League	GP	W	L	T	OTL	MIN	GA	SO	GAA	SV%	GP	W	L	MIN	GA	SO	GAA	SV%
2001–02	Cape Breton Screaming Eagles	QMJHL	1	1	0	0	—	38	0	0	0.00	1.000	—	—	—	—	—	—	—	—
2002–03	Cape Breton Screaming Eagles	QMJHL	30	4	18	3	—	1450	98	0	4.06	.895	1	0	0	11	0	0	0.00	1.000
2003–04	Cape Breton Screaming Eagles	QMJHL	51	34	15	1	—	2951	114	3	2.32	.921	4	1	3	251	13	0	3.10	.886
2004–05	Cape Breton Screaming Eagles	QMJHL	56	26	18	5	—	3108	130	6	2.51	.911	4	1	3	245	10	0	2.44	.905
2005–06	Philadelphia Phantoms	AHL	40	18	18	—	1	2153	91	2	2.54	.914	—	—	—	—	—	—	—	—
2005–06	Trenton Titans	ECHL	7	4	3	—	0	429	15	1	2.10	.935	—	—	—	—	—	—	—	—
2006–07	Philadelphia Flyers	NHL	1	0	0	—	0	2	1	0	27.27	.667	—	—	—	—	—	—	—	—
2006–07	Philadelphia Phantoms	AHL	38	12	17	—	2	1879	104	0	3.32	.893	—	—	—	—	—	—	—	—
2007–08	Wheeling Nailers	ECHL	26	5	13	—	3	1318	82	0	3.73	.889	—	—	—	—	—	—	—	—
2007–08	Philadelphia Phantoms	AHL	10	2	5	—	0	442	21	1	2.85	.892	—	—	—	—	—	—	—	—
2008–09	Las Vegas Wranglers	ECHL	3	1	2	—	0	178	9	0	3.03	.845	—	—	—	—	—	—	—	—
2008–09	Cincinnati Cyclones	ECHL	14	7	4	—	2	791	40	0	3.04	.885	—	—	—	—	—	—	—	—
AHL totals			88	32	40	—	3	4474	216	3	2.90	.903	—	—	—	—	—	—	—	—
NHL totals			1	0	0	—	0	2	1	0	27.27	.667	—	—	—	—	—	—	—	—
