= Michel Deziel =

Canadian ice hockey player

- Born: January 31, 1954 (age 71); Sorel, Quebec, Canada
- Height: 5 ft 11 in (180 cm)
- Weight: 180 lb (82 kg; 12 st 12 lb)
- Position: Left wing
- Shot: Left
- Played for: Buffalo Sabres
- NHL draft: 47th overall, 1974; Buffalo Sabres
- WHA draft: 56th overall, 1974; New England Whalers
- Playing career: 1974–1980

Michel Deziel (born January 31, 1954, in Sorel-Tracy, Quebec) is a Canadian former professional ice hockey left winger. He was drafted in the third round, 47th overall, by the Buffalo Sabres in the 1974 NHL Amateur Draft. He played one game in the National Hockey League with the Sabres, appearing in a single playoff contest during 1975 playoffs, on May 1, 1975, against the Montreal Canadiens. He did not score a point. The rest of his career, which lasted from 1974 to 1980, was spent in the minor leagues.

Deziel was a star in Quebec Major Junior Hockey League, one season (1973–74) scoring 227 points in 69 games for the Sorel Black Hawks, a team that averaged 8.9 goals per game. The mark stands as the fourth-highest single-season point total in QMJHL history.

He was also drafted by the World Hockey Association's New England Whalers; however, he never played in that league.

== Career statistics ==
=== Regular season and playoffs ===
| | | | Regular season | | | | | Playoffs |
| Season | Team | League | GP | G | A | Pts | PIM | GP | G | A | Pts | PIM |
|---|---|---|---|---|---|---|---|---|---|---|---|---|
| 1970–71 | Sorel Black Hawks | QMJHL | 60 | 25 | 22 | 47 | 44 | 7 | 2 | 5 | 7 | 0 |
| 1971–72 | Sorel Black Hawks | QMJHL | 48 | 29 | 32 | 61 | 30 | — | — | — | — | — |
| 1972–73 | Sorel Black Hawks | QMJHL | 64 | 50 | 72 | 122 | 49 | — | — | — | — | — |
| 1973–74 | Sorel Black Hawks | QMJHL | 69 | 92 | 135 | 227 | 69 | — | — | — | — | — |
| 1974–75 | Hershey Bears | AHL | 69 | 27 | 24 | 51 | 10 | 8 | 0 | 3 | 3 | 16 |
| 1974–75 | Buffalo Sabres | NHL | — | — | — | — | — | 1 | 0 | 0 | 0 | 0 |
| 1975–76 | Hershey Bears | AHL | 71 | 25 | 30 | 55 | 42 | 4 | 0 | 0 | 0 | 2 |
| 1976–77 | Rhode Island Reds | AHL | 70 | 15 | 28 | 43 | 10 | — | — | — | — | — |
| 1977–78 | Binghamton Dusters | AHL | 8 | 2 | 0 | 2 | 2 | — | — | — | — | — |
| 1979–80 | Milwaukee Admirals | IHL | 9 | 1 | 0 | 1 | 2 | — | — | — | — | — |
| AHL totals | | | 218 | 69 | 82 | 151 | 64 | 12 | 0 | 3 | 3 | 18 |
| NHL totals | | | — | — | — | — | — | 1 | 0 | 0 | 0 | 0 |

== See also ==
- List of players who played only one game in the NHL
