= Guy Chouinard =

Canadian ice hockey player (1956–2025)

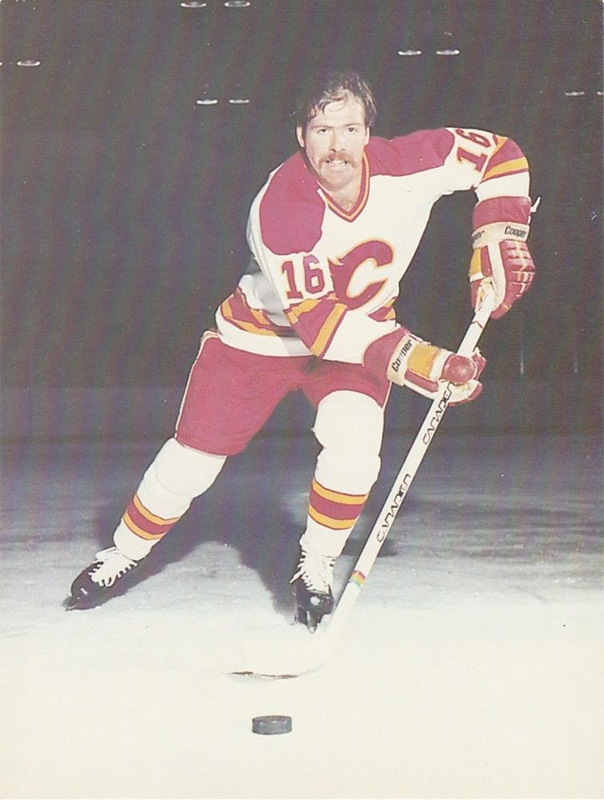
- Chouinard in 1980 postcard
- Born: October 20, 1956 Quebec City, Quebec, Canada
- Died: December 28, 2025 (aged 69)
- Height: 5 ft 11 in (180 cm)
- Weight: 182 lb (83 kg; 13 st 0 lb)
- Position: Centre
- Shot: Right
- Played for: Atlanta Flames; Calgary Flames; St. Louis Blues
- NHL draft: 28th overall, 1974; Atlanta Flames
- Playing career: 1974–1985

Guy Camil Chouinard (October 20, 1956 – December 28, 2025) was a Canadian professional ice hockey player who played in the 1970s and '80s for the Atlanta Flames, Calgary Flames, and St. Louis Blues. He also had a lengthy career as a coach in the QMJHL following his retiring as a player. He was supplementally the head coach in Quebec's college hockey league with the Champlain-St. Lawrence Lions in Quebec City.

== Playing career ==
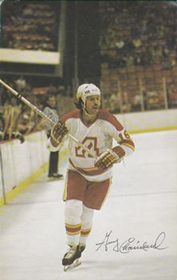
Chouinard in 1977 card for Atlanta Flames

As a youth, Chouinard played in four consecutive Quebec International Pee-Wee Hockey Tournaments from 1966 to 1969, with the Quebec Citadelles and Quebec Beavers minor ice hockey teams from Quebec City.

Chouinard was selected by the Atlanta Flames with the 28th overall pick in the 1974 NHL entry draft, following a successful junior career with the Quebec Remparts in which he was a regular at the age of 15. He was one of the first underage players available in the entry draft after the National Hockey League's decision allowing the drafting of underage players. While playing with Atlanta, he set records for scoring goals in six consecutive games from November 14 to November 24, 1978; he was the first Flame to score 50 goals in a season in the 1978–79 season. Chouinard scored the final goal in Atlanta Flames history during the 1979-80 NHL playoffs in a 5-2 home team loss against the New York Rangers. He remained with the team when it relocated to Calgary for the 1980–81 season. He left the Flames franchise as its all-time leader in points (529) and assists (336) (records since broken) on September 6, 1983, when he was traded to the St. Louis Blues for future considerations.

After playing in the first nine games of the 1984-85 season in the International Hockey League with Peoria, Chouinard opted to retire.

== Coaching career ==
Chouinard also had a long career coaching in the Quebec Major Junior Hockey League, notably for the Victoriaville Tigres, Quebec Remparts, and Prince Edward Island Rocket and was enshrined in the QMJHL Hall of Fame in 2005. He has coached the second most games in the QMJHL (988), most wins as a coach (515) and most championships as a coach (4).

From 2002 to 2006, he coached in the Ligue Nord-Américaine de Hockey, a minor professional league in Quebec, first with the Trois-Rivieres Vikings, then the Thetford-Mines Prolab. He was fired as the Prolab head-coach on January 13, 2006, after a 7–3 loss against the Saint-Hyacinthe Cristal. With the Prolab, his record was 45 wins and 48 loss (including 10 shootout loss and 2 losses in overtime).

Chouinard was hired by the QMJHL's Prince Edward Island Rocket to replace Yanick Jean as head coach, on October 22, 2007. He was relieved of his duties on October 6, 2009.

== Personal life and death ==
Chouinard was nicknamed "Gramps" because he appeared much older than he really was. He was not the only member of his family to play professional hockey; he was the older brother of former minor-leaguer Jean Chouinard and the father of Eric Chouinard. His nephew, Marc Chouinard, played in the NHL for the Mighty Ducks of Anaheim, Minnesota Wild and Vancouver Canucks.

Chouinard died on December 28, 2025, at the age of 69. His death was announced by the QMJHL via X.

== Career statistics ==
=== Regular season and playoffs ===
			Regular season					Playoffs
Season	Team	League	GP	G	A	Pts	PIM	GP	G	A	Pts	PIM
1971–72	Quebec Remparts	QMJHL	58	29	41	70	6	—	—	—	—	—
1972–73	Quebec Remparts	QMJHL	59	43	86	129	11	—	—	—	—	—
1973–74	Quebec Remparts	QMJHL	62	75	85	160	22	4	0	1	1	0
1974–75	Atlanta Flames	NHL	5	0	0	0	2	—	—	—	—	—
1974–75	Omaha Knights	CHL	70	28	40	68	6	6	1	6	7	0
1975–76	Nova Scotia Voyageurs	AHL	70	40	40	80	14	9	6	9	15	0
1975–76	Atlanta Flames	NHL	4	0	2	2	2	2	0	0	0	0
1976–77	Atlanta Flames	NHL	80	17	33	50	8	3	2	0	2	0
1977–78	Atlanta Flames	NHL	73	28	30	58	8	2	1	0	1	0
1978–79	Atlanta Flames	NHL	80	50	57	107	14	2	1	2	3	0
1979–80	Atlanta Flames	NHL	76	31	46	77	22	4	1	3	4	4
1980–81	Calgary Flames	NHL	52	31	52	83	24	16	3	14	17	4
1981–82	Calgary Flames	NHL	64	23	57	80	12	3	0	1	1	0
1982–83	Calgary Flames	NHL	80	13	59	72	18	9	1	6	7	4
1983–84	St. Louis Blues	NHL	64	12	34	46	10	5	0	2	2	0
1984–85	Peoria Rivermen	IHL	9	2	5	7	0	—	—	—	—	—
NHL totals			578	205	370	575	120	46	9	28	37	12

== See also ==
- Notable families in the NHL
- List of NHL players with 100-point seasons
