= Sorel Éperviers =

Ice hockey team

- City: Sorel-Tracy & Verdun, Quebec
- League: QMJHL
- Operated: 1969 to 1981
- Home arena: Colisée Cardin & Verdun Auditorium

Franchise history
- 1969–77: Sorel Éperviers
- 1977–79: Verdun Éperviers
- 1979–80: Verdun/Sorel Éperviers
- 1980–81: Sorel Éperviers
- 1981–95: Granby Bisons
- 1995–97: Granby Prédateurs
- 1997–2019: Cape Breton Screaming Eagles
- 2019–present: Cape Breton Eagles

The Sorel Éperviers (Black Hawks) were a junior ice hockey team in the Quebec Major Junior Hockey League from 1969 to 1981. The team was one of the founding members of the QMJHL. They mostly played at the Colisée Cardin in Sorel-Tracy, Quebec, but also spent a few seasons at the Verdun Auditorium in the Montreal suburb of Verdun, Quebec. Rodrigue Lemoyne served as the team's general manager. Ray Bourque is the only former Épervier in the Hockey Hall of Fame.

The Éperviers originated in the Quebec Junior Hockey League, and were the league's champion, coached by Ken Hodge in 1969. At 21, Ken Hodge was believed to be the youngest junior hockey coach in history. Hodge, who would go on to earn 742 coaching victories in the WHL with the Portland Winter Hawks. Sorel were finalists in the eastern Canadian championship for the George Richardson Memorial Trophy, losing 3 games to 1 to the Montreal Junior Canadiens.

The 1973–74 QMJHL season sparked an offensive explosion, unmatched in Canadian Hockey League history. Sorel set a CHL record of 620 goals scored as a team. Three Sorel players, Pierre Larouche, Michel Deziel and Jacques Cossette, had more than 90 goals and 200 points each. Sorel goaltender Claude Legris also posted the highest goals against average of 4.50 goals per game for a Jacques Plante Memorial Trophy winner.

In 1981 the franchise moved to Granby, Quebec where they became the Granby Bisons. They won the Memorial Cup there in 1996. The franchise is today the Cape Breton Eagles.

== NHL alumni ==
- Norm Aubin
- Marco Baron
- Michel Belhumeur
- Michel Bergeron
- Serge Bernier
- Gilles Bilodeau
- Raymond Bourque
- Jacques Cossette
- Richard David
- Lucien DeBlois
- Michel Deziel
- Jean-Marc Gaulin
- Pierre Giroux
- Benoit Gosselin
- Brian Johnson
- Steve Kasper
- Alain Langlais
- Jean-Marc Lanthier
- Pierre Larouche
- Claude Legris
- Pierre Mondou
- Bob Ritchie
- Ron Smith
- Chris Valentine

== Season-by-season record ==
- Sorel Éperviers (1969–1977)
- Verdun Éperviers (1977–1979)
- Verdun/Sorel Éperviers (1979–1980)
- Sorel Éperviers (1980–1981)

Note :Pct = Winning percentage

Season	Games	Won	Lost	Tied	Points	Pct	Goals for	Goals against	Standing
1969–70	56	33	23	0	66	0.589	295	220	4th, East
1970–71	62	25	36	1	51	0.411	214	249	6th, QMJHL
1971–72	62	38	24	0	76	0.613	287	224	4th, QMJHL
1972–73	64	38	23	3	79	0.617	398	362	3rd, QMJHL
1973–74	70	58	11	1	117	0.836	620	301	1st, East
1974–75	72	20	43	9	49	0.340	297	388	4th, East
1975–76	72	27	34	11	65	0.451	302	377	4th, East
1976–77	72	19	48	5	43	0.299	319	448	5th, Dilio
1977–78	72	32	31	9	73	0.507	378	332	4th, Lebel
1978–79	72	41	24	7	89	0.618	367	313	1st, Lebel
1979–80	72	20	47	5	45	0.312	321	426	4th, Lebel
1980–81	72	36	30	6	78	0.542	333	303	2nd, Lebel
