= Claude Legris =

Canadian ice hockey player (born 1956)

- Born: November 6, 1956 (age 68); Verdun, Quebec, Canada
- Height: 5 ft 9 in (175 cm)
- Weight: 164 lb (74 kg; 11 st 10 lb)
- Position: Goalie
- Caught: Left
- Played for: Detroit Red Wings
- NHL draft: 120th overall, 1976; Detroit Red Wings
- WHA draft: 89th overall, 1976; San Diego Mariners
- Playing career: 1976–1983

Claude Legris (born November 6, 1956) is a Canadian former professional ice hockey player who played four games in the National Hockey League with the Detroit Red Wings during the 1980–81 and 1981–82 seasons. The rest of his career, which lasted from 1976 to 1983, was spent in the minor leagues. As a youth, he played in the 1969 Quebec International Pee-Wee Hockey Tournament with a minor ice hockey team from Verdun.

== Career statistics ==
=== Regular season and playoffs ===
			Regular season									Playoffs
Season	Team	League	GP	W	L	T	MIN	GA	SO	GAA	SV%	GP	W	L	MIN	GA	SO	GAA	SV%
1972–73	Sorel Eperviers	QMJHL	31	14	10	1	1577	156	0	5.94	.856	6	2	3	301	36	0	7.18	.824
1973–74	Sorel Eperviers	QMJHL	53	40	8	0	2906	222	1	4.58	.869	12	8	3	680	53	0	4.68	.868
1974–75	Sorel Eperviers	QMJHL	46	16	25	3	2591	231	0	5.35	.862	—	—	—	—	—	—	—	—
1975–76	Trois-Rivieres Draveurs	QMJHL	21	7	9	3	1165	97	0	5.00	.848	—	—	—	—	—	—	—	—
1975–76	Sorel Eperviers	QMJHL	46	17	20	8	2697	204	0	4.54	.881	5	1	4	299	23	0	4.63	.893
1976–77	Campbellton Tigers	NNBHL	—	—	—	—	—	—	—	—	—	—	—	—	—	—	—	—	—
1977–78	Campbellton Tigers	NNBHL	1	1	0	0	60	1	0	1.00	—	4	—	—	232	13	0	3.36	—
1977–78	Bathurst Alpines	NNBHL	—	—	—	—	—	—	—	—	—	1	1	0	60	1	0	1.00	—
1978–79	Kalamazoo Wings	IHL	16	—	—	—	730	55	0	4.52	—	3	2	1	179	8	0	2.68	—
1979–80	Johnstown Red Wings	EHL	1	—	—	—	33	4	0	7.27	—	—	—	—	—	—	—	—	—
1979–80	Adirondack Red Wings	AHL	17	3	6	5	898	64	0	4.27	—	—	—	—	—	—	—	—	—
1980–81	Detroit Red Wings	NHL	3	0	1	1	64	4	0	3.79	.882	—	—	—	—	—	—	—	—
1980–81	Adirondack Red Wings	AHL	2	1	1	0	120	7	0	3.50	—	—	—	—	—	—	—	—	—
1980–81	Kalamazoo Wings	IHL	52	—	—	—	3010	154	5	3.07	—	6	2	2	251	17	1	4.06	—
1981–82	Detroit Red Wings	NHL	1	0	0	1	29	0	0	0.00	1.000	—	—	—	—	—	—	—	—
1981–82	Springfield Indians	AHL	18	7	9	1	1002	71	0	4.25	—	—	—	—	—	—	—	—	—
1981–82	Kalamazoo Wings	IHL	7	—	—	—	396	28	0	4.24	—	—	—	—	—	—	—	—	—
1982–83	Adirondack Red Wings	AHL	32	11	12	2	1680	118	0	4.21	—	—	—	—	—	—	—	—	—
NHL totals			4	0	1	1	92	4	0	2.62	.923	—	—	—	—	—	—	—	—

== Awards ==
- 1980–81: James Norris Memorial Trophy, Kalamazoo Wings (co-winner with Georges Gagnon)
