= List of NHL players with 100-point seasons =

As of the completion of the 2024–25 regular season, 127 ice hockey players in the National Hockey League (NHL) have scored at least 100 points in a single NHL regular season.

Collectively, these players have achieved this feat on 318 occasions, playing for 26 franchises. This includes six additions in 2024–25, one first-timer and five players who achieved a repeat 100-point season. Including eight franchises that have changed cities, there have been 29 teams with 100-point players.

== Season achievements ==
The first NHL season in which a player scored 100 points was the 1968–69 season (in which 12 teams played 76 games each), when Phil Esposito scored his hundredth point on March 2, 1969. Esposito finished the season with 126 points, and two other players achieved 100 points that season: Bobby Hull, who finished with 107 points, and Gordie Howe, who finished with 103 points. The first (of six) defencemen to reach the 100-point mark in the NHL was Bobby Orr, in 1969–70.

Since 1968–69, there have only been seven seasons without a 100-point player. No player achieved 100 points during the lockout years of 1994–95, 2004–05 (which was cancelled outright), and 2012–13. In addition, no player achieved 100 points in the full seasons of 1999–2000, 2001–02, 2003–04, and 2014–15.

A record 21 players scored 100 points in 1992–93, the same season that a record 14 players reached the 50-goal plateau. The second most to achieve 100 points in the same season was 16, in 1984–85. By contrast, the 100-point player became a rarity in the eight seasons from 1996–97 to 2003–04; only eight players, on eleven occasions, playing for five teams, reached the century mark.

== Player achievements ==
The player with the most 100-point seasons is Wayne Gretzky, with 15. Mario Lemieux is second, with 10 seasons of 100 points. Gretzky also holds the record of 13 consecutive 100-point seasons. In addition, Gretzky holds the record as the quickest – and second quickest – to achieve 100 points in a season, scoring his 100th point in game 34 of the 1983–84 season, followed by scoring his 100th point in game 35 of the 1984–85 season. The defenceman with the most 100-point seasons, and the most consecutive, is Bobby Orr, with six. Bobby Orr and Paul Coffey share the record for fastest 100 points by defenseman, with Orr scoring his 100th point in the 59th game of the 1970-71 season, and Paul Coffey scoring his 100th point in his 59th (team's 60th) game of the 1985-86 season.

Five players could have made the list on assists alone: Orr, Gretzky (11 times), Lemieux, Connor McDavid and Nikita Kucherov have had at least 100 assists in a single season.

On six occasions a player has been traded during a 100-point season: Jean Ratelle, Bernie Nicholls, John Cullen, Teemu Selanne, Wayne Gretzky, and Joe Thornton. Thornton is also the only NHL player in history to be traded in the same year they won the Art Ross Trophy as the NHL’s leading scorer.

Excluding the six split-team situations above, and excluding franchises that have simply changed cities, 17 players have achieved complete 100-point-or-more seasons with two teams. The first was Marcel Dionne in 1974–75 with the Detroit Red Wings and then 1976–77 with the Los Angeles Kings. No player has done this with three teams, unless the split-team situations are counted, in which case Gretzky would be considered the only player to accomplish this: Edmonton Oilers (9 times), Los Angeles Kings (5 times), and, in 1995–96, combined Kings/St. Louis Blues. Gretzky, Coffey, and Adam Oates are the only players to have two 100 point seasons with two different teams (Joe Sakic scored 100 points with the Quebec Nordiques and also with the Colorado Avalanche, which are two different teams, though technically the same franchise).

Six defencemen have scored at least 100 points in a season. They are Bobby Orr (six times, including the overall defenceman record of 139 points in 1970–71), Paul Coffey (five times), Denis Potvin, Al MacInnis, Brian Leetch, and Erik Karlsson (the most recent, in 2022–23).

The youngest player to achieve a 100-point season is Sidney Crosby, at 18 years, 253 days old. He scored his 100th NHL point on April 17, 2006, the Pittsburgh Penguins' 81st game of the 2005–06 season, his rookie season. The oldest player to achieve a 100-point season is Gordie Howe, at 40 years, 364 days—the day before his 41st birthday. He scored his hundredth point of the 1968–69 season on March 30, 1969 – only four weeks after Phil Esposito became the first ever player to score 100 points – while playing for the Detroit Red Wings. Joe Sakic had the greatest time period between first and last 100 point seasons, achieving his first in 1988-89, and his last in 2005-06, for a span of 17 years.

Wayne Gretzky is the only player to achieve or surpass a 200-point season, doing so with the Edmonton Oilers four times: 1981–82 and three consecutive from 1983–84 to 1985–86. When he accomplished this feat in 1981–82, Gretzky also became the first ever player to surpass 160, 170, 180, and 190 points in a season. While Gretzky would surpass each of the 160 through 190-point thresholds multiple times, only one other player has ever reached those marks – Mario Lemieux. It is only at the 150-point threshold that a few other players (four) have joined those two players: the six players to achieve or surpass a 150-point season are Wayne Gretzky (nine times), Mario Lemieux (four times), and once each for Phil Esposito, Bernie Nicholls, Steve Yzerman and Connor McDavid. Names and number of seasons quickly escalate below 150 points.

== Team achievements ==
Excluding the six split-team players above, the Edmonton Oilers have had the most incidents of a player achieving 100 points during the franchise's history, with 43. Excluding the same six players, the Pittsburgh Penguins have had the greatest number of unique players achieve 100 points, with 12. The Boston Bruins have had 11 different players achieve 100 points, and the Edmonton Oilers have had ten different players achieve 100 points while with the team.

The Boston Bruins were the first team to have four players achieve 100 points in the same season, 1970–71. The Edmonton Oilers are the only team to achieve this feat multiple times, seeing four players score 100 points three different times – 1982–83, 1983–84 and 1985–86. The Pittsburgh Penguins are the only other team to register four players with 100 points in the same season, 1992–93.

The Pittsburgh Penguins have had at least one 100-point player in 23 different seasons. The Edmonton Oilers have achieved the feat in 19 different seasons, including at least one 100-point player in eleven consecutive seasons, from 1979–80 to 1989–90.

The Los Angeles Kings are the only team to have two players achieve 150+ points in the same year, with Wayne Gretzky (168 points) and Bernie Nicholls (150 points) achieving this in 1988–89.

Five franchises have had 100 point players before and after the entire team moved: the Hartford Whalers/Carolina Hurricanes, the Atlanta Flames/Calgary Flames, the Quebec Nordiques/Colorado Avalanche, the Minnesota North Stars/Dallas Stars, and the Atlanta Thrashers/original and modern Winnipeg Jets. The Phoenix/Arizona Coyotes, who formerly inherited the franchise records of the original Winnipeg Jets, never had a 100-point player in their existence from 1996 to 2024.

Of the 32 franchises in the NHL in 2025–26, six have never had a player achieve a 100 point season: New Jersey Devils (started as Kansas City Scouts in 1974–75), Nashville Predators (1998–99), Columbus Blue Jackets (joined in 2000–01 season),, Vegas Golden Knights (2017–18), Seattle Kraken (2021–22), and Utah Mammoth (2024–25 as Utah Hockey Club).

== Players and their 100-point seasons ==
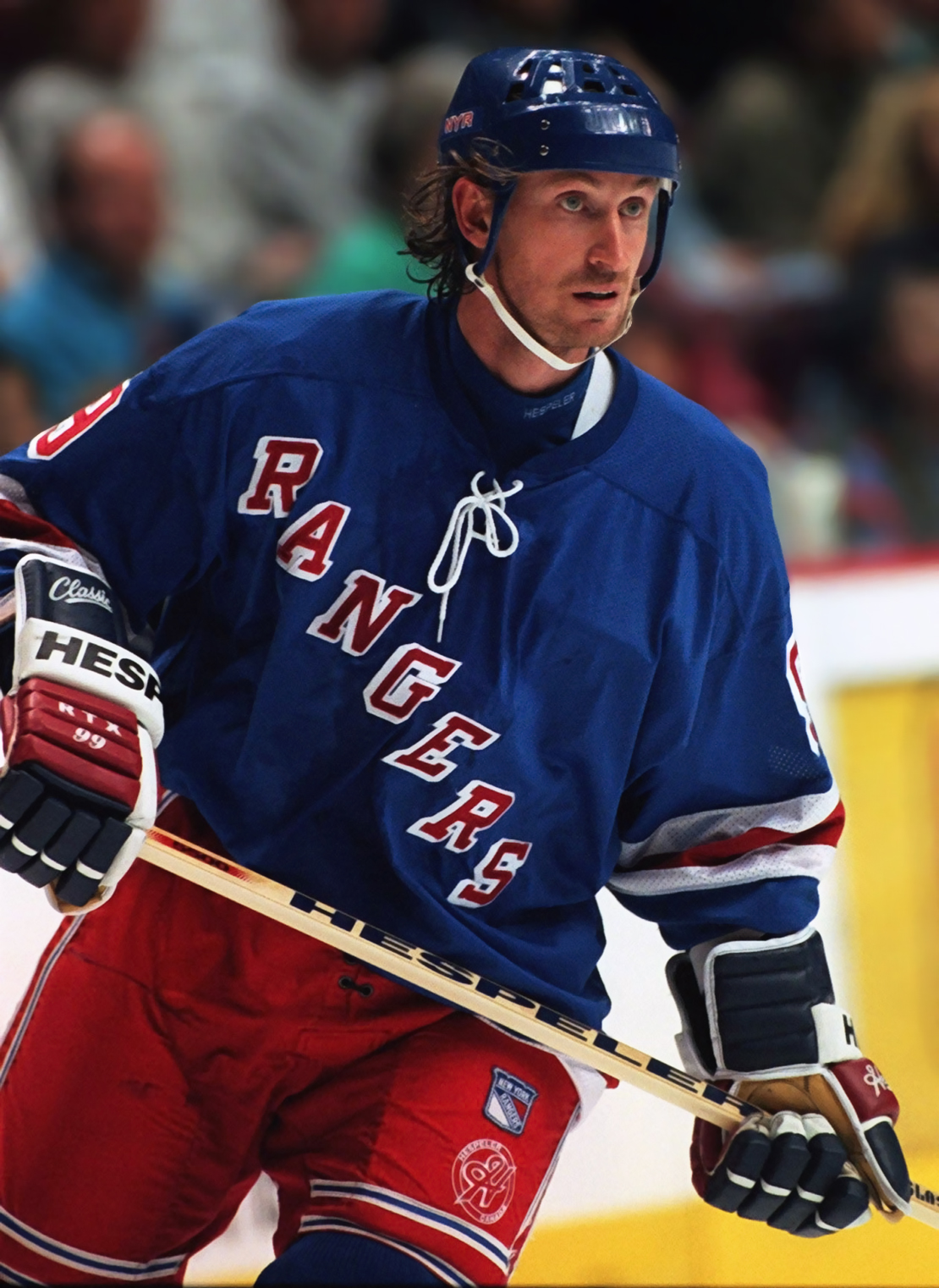
Wayne Gretzky has the most 100 point seasons in the NHL (15)

Legend
Team – Team for which the player acquired 100 points or more
GP – Games played
G – Goals
A – Assists

Currently active in the NHL
Inducted into the Hockey Hall of Fame

Player	Team	Season	GP	G	A	Pts.
Daniel Alfredsson	Ottawa Senators	2005–06	77	43	60	103
Glenn Anderson	Edmonton Oilers	1981–82	80	38	67	105
Glenn Anderson	Edmonton Oilers	1982–83	72	48	56	104
Glenn Anderson	Edmonton Oilers	1985–86	72	54	48	102
Nicklas Backstrom	Washington Capitals	2009–10	82	33	68	101
Bill Barber	Philadelphia Flyers	1975–76	80	50	62	112
Mike Bossy	New York Islanders	1978–79	80	69	57	126
Mike Bossy	New York Islanders	1980–81	79	68	51	119
Mike Bossy	New York Islanders	1981–82	80	64	83	147
Mike Bossy	New York Islanders	1982–83	79	60	58	118
Mike Bossy	New York Islanders	1983–84	79	51	67	118
Mike Bossy	New York Islanders	1984–85	76	58	59	117
Mike Bossy	New York Islanders	1985–86	80	61	62	123
Neal Broten	Minnesota North Stars	1985–86	80	29	76	105
Rob Brown	Pittsburgh Penguins	1988–89	68	49	66	115
Johnny Bucyk	Boston Bruins	1970–71	78	51	65	116
Mike Bullard	Calgary Flames	1987–88	79	48	55	103
Pavel Bure	Vancouver Canucks	1992–93	83	60	50	110
Pavel Bure	Vancouver Canucks	1993–94	76	60	47	107
Jimmy Carson	Los Angeles Kings	1987–88	80	55	52	107
Jimmy Carson	Edmonton Oilers	1988–89	80	49	51	100
Macklin Celebrini	San Jose Sharks	2025–26	82	45	70	115
Guy Chouinard	Atlanta Flames	1978–79	80	50	57	107
Dino Ciccarelli	Minnesota North Stars	1981–82	76	55	51	106
Dino Ciccarelli	Minnesota North Stars	1986–87	80	52	51	103
Bobby Clarke	Philadelphia Flyers	1972–73	78	37	67	104
Bobby Clarke	Philadelphia Flyers	1974–75	80	27	89	116
Bobby Clarke	Philadelphia Flyers	1975–76	76	30	89	119
Paul Coffey	Edmonton Oilers	1983–84	80	40	86	126
Paul Coffey	Edmonton Oilers	1984–85	80	37	84	121
Paul Coffey	Edmonton Oilers	1985–86	79	48	90	138
Paul Coffey	Pittsburgh Penguins	1988–89	75	30	83	113
Paul Coffey	Pittsburgh Penguins	1989–90	80	29	74	103
Sidney Crosby	Pittsburgh Penguins	2005–06	81	39	63	102
Sidney Crosby	Pittsburgh Penguins	2006–07	79	36	84	120
Sidney Crosby	Pittsburgh Penguins	2008–09	77	33	70	103
Sidney Crosby	Pittsburgh Penguins	2009–10	81	51	58	109
Sidney Crosby	Pittsburgh Penguins	2013–14	80	36	68	104
Sidney Crosby	Pittsburgh Penguins	2018–19	79	35	65	100
John Cullen	Pittsburgh Penguins/Hartford Whalers	1990–91	78	39	71	110
Marcel Dionne	Detroit Red Wings	1974–75	80	47	74	121
Marcel Dionne	Los Angeles Kings	1976–77	80	53	69	122
Marcel Dionne	Los Angeles Kings	1978–79	80	59	71	130
Marcel Dionne	Los Angeles Kings	1979–80	80	53	84	137
Marcel Dionne	Los Angeles Kings	1980–81	80	58	77	135
Marcel Dionne	Los Angeles Kings	1981–82	78	50	67	117
Marcel Dionne	Los Angeles Kings	1982–83	80	56	51	107
Marcel Dionne	Los Angeles Kings	1984–85	80	46	80	126
Leon Draisaitl	Edmonton Oilers	2018–19	82	50	55	105
Leon Draisaitl	Edmonton Oilers	2019–20	71	43	67	110
Leon Draisaitl	Edmonton Oilers	2021–22	80	55	55	110
Leon Draisaitl	Edmonton Oilers	2022–23	80	52	76	128
Leon Draisaitl	Edmonton Oilers	2023–24	81	41	65	106
Leon Draisaitl	Edmonton Oilers	2024–25	71	52	54	106
Phil Esposito	Boston Bruins	1968–69	74	49	77	126
Phil Esposito	Boston Bruins	1970–71	78	76	76	152
Phil Esposito	Boston Bruins	1971–72	76	66	67	133
Phil Esposito	Boston Bruins	1972–73	78	55	75	130
Phil Esposito	Boston Bruins	1973–74	78	68	77	145
Phil Esposito	Boston Bruins	1974–75	79	61	66	127
Bernie Federko	St. Louis Blues	1980–81	78	31	73	104
Bernie Federko	St. Louis Blues	1983–84	79	41	66	107
Bernie Federko	St. Louis Blues	1984–85	76	30	73	103
Bernie Federko	St. Louis Blues	1985–86	80	34	68	102
Sergei Fedorov	Detroit Red Wings	1993–94	82	56	64	120
Sergei Fedorov	Detroit Red Wings	1995–96	78	39	68	107
Theoren Fleury	Calgary Flames	1990–91	79	51	53	104
Theoren Fleury	Calgary Flames	1992–93	83	34	66	100
Peter Forsberg	Colorado Avalanche	1995–96	82	30	86	116
Peter Forsberg	Colorado Avalanche	2002–03	75	29	77	106
Ron Francis	Hartford Whalers	1989–90	80	32	69	101
Ron Francis	Pittsburgh Penguins	1992–93	84	24	76	100
Ron Francis	Pittsburgh Penguins	1995–96	77	27	92	119
Mike Gartner	Washington Capitals	1984–85	80	50	52	102
Johnny Gaudreau	Calgary Flames	2021–22	82	40	75	115
Doug Gilmour	St. Louis Blues	1986–87	80	42	63	105
Doug Gilmour	Toronto Maple Leafs	1992–93	83	32	95	127
Doug Gilmour	Toronto Maple Leafs	1993–94	83	27	84	111
Claude Giroux	Philadelphia Flyers	2017–18	82	34	68	102
Michel Goulet	Quebec Nordiques	1982–83	80	57	48	105
Michel Goulet	Quebec Nordiques	1983–84	75	56	65	121
Michel Goulet	Quebec Nordiques	1985–86	75	53	51	104
Michel Goulet	Quebec Nordiques	1987–88	80	48	58	106
Wayne Gretzky	Edmonton Oilers	1979–80	79	51	86	137
Wayne Gretzky	Edmonton Oilers	1980–81	80	55	109	164
Wayne Gretzky	Edmonton Oilers	1981–82	80	92	120	212
Wayne Gretzky	Edmonton Oilers	1982–83	80	71	125	196
Wayne Gretzky	Edmonton Oilers	1983–84	74	87	118	205
Wayne Gretzky	Edmonton Oilers	1984–85	80	73	135	208
Wayne Gretzky	Edmonton Oilers	1985–86	80	52	163	215
Wayne Gretzky	Edmonton Oilers	1986–87	79	62	121	183
Wayne Gretzky	Edmonton Oilers	1987–88	64	40	109	149
Wayne Gretzky	Los Angeles Kings	1988–89	78	54	114	168
Wayne Gretzky	Los Angeles Kings	1989–90	73	40	102	142
Wayne Gretzky	Los Angeles Kings	1990–91	78	41	122	163
Wayne Gretzky	Los Angeles Kings	1991–92	74	31	90	121
Wayne Gretzky	Los Angeles Kings	1993–94	81	38	92	130
Wayne Gretzky	Los Angeles Kings/St. Louis Blues	1995–96	80	23	79	102
Vic Hadfield	New York Rangers	1971–72	78	50	56	106
Dale Hawerchuk	Winnipeg Jets (original)	1981–82	80	45	58	103
Dale Hawerchuk	Winnipeg Jets (original)	1983–84	80	37	65	102
Dale Hawerchuk	Winnipeg Jets (original)	1984–85	80	53	77	130
Dale Hawerchuk	Winnipeg Jets (original)	1985–86	80	46	59	105
Dale Hawerchuk	Winnipeg Jets (original)	1986–87	80	47	53	100
Dale Hawerchuk	Winnipeg Jets (original)	1987–88	80	44	77	121
Dany Heatley	Ottawa Senators	2005–06	82	50	53	103
Dany Heatley	Ottawa Senators	2006–07	82	50	55	105
Ken Hodge	Boston Bruins	1970–71	78	43	62	105
Ken Hodge	Boston Bruins	1973–74	76	50	55	105
Marian Hossa	Atlanta Thrashers	2006–07	82	43	57	100
Gordie Howe	Detroit Red Wings	1968–69	76	44	59	103
Jonathan Huberdeau	Florida Panthers	2021–22	80	30	85	115
Bobby Hull	Chicago Black Hawks	1968–69	74	58	49	107
Brett Hull	St. Louis Blues	1989–90	80	72	41	113
Brett Hull	St. Louis Blues	1990–91	78	86	45	131
Brett Hull	St. Louis Blues	1991–92	73	70	39	109
Brett Hull	St. Louis Blues	1992–93	80	54	47	101
Jaromir Jagr	Pittsburgh Penguins	1995–96	82	62	87	149
Jaromir Jagr	Pittsburgh Penguins	1997–98	77	35	67	102
Jaromir Jagr	Pittsburgh Penguins	1998–99	81	44	83	127
Jaromir Jagr	Pittsburgh Penguins	2000–01	81	52	69	121
Jaromir Jagr	New York Rangers	2005–06	82	54	69	123
Craig Janney	St. Louis Blues	1992–93	84	24	82	106
Joe Juneau	Boston Bruins	1992–93	84	32	70	102
Patrick Kane	Chicago Blackhawks	2015–16	82	46	60	106
Patrick Kane	Chicago Blackhawks	2018–19	81	44	66	110
Kirill Kaprizov	Minnesota Wild	2021–22	81	47	61	108
Paul Kariya	Mighty Ducks of Anaheim	1995–96	82	50	58	108
Paul Kariya	Mighty Ducks of Anaheim	1998–99	82	39	62	101
Erik Karlsson	San Jose Sharks	2022–23	82	25	76	101
Nikita Kucherov	Tampa Bay Lightning	2017–18	80	39	61	100
Nikita Kucherov	Tampa Bay Lightning	2018–19	82	41	87	128
Nikita Kucherov	Tampa Bay Lightning	2022–23	82	30	83	113
Nikita Kucherov	Tampa Bay Lightning	2023–24	81	44	100	144
Nikita Kucherov	Tampa Bay Lightning	2024–25	78	37	84	121
Nikita Kucherov	Tampa Bay Lightning	2025–26	76	44	86	130
Jari Kurri	Edmonton Oilers	1982–83	80	45	59	104
Jari Kurri	Edmonton Oilers	1983–84	64	52	61	113
Jari Kurri	Edmonton Oilers	1984–85	73	71	64	135
Jari Kurri	Edmonton Oilers	1985–86	78	68	63	131
Jari Kurri	Edmonton Oilers	1986–87	79	54	54	108
Jari Kurri	Edmonton Oilers	1988–89	76	44	58	102
Pat LaFontaine	New York Islanders	1989–90	74	54	51	105
Pat LaFontaine	Buffalo Sabres	1992–93	84	53	95	148
Guy Lafleur	Montreal Canadiens	1974–75	70	53	66	119
Guy Lafleur	Montreal Canadiens	1975–76	80	56	69	125
Guy Lafleur	Montreal Canadiens	1976–77	80	56	80	136
Guy Lafleur	Montreal Canadiens	1977–78	78	60	72	132
Guy Lafleur	Montreal Canadiens	1978–79	80	52	77	129
Guy Lafleur	Montreal Canadiens	1979–80	74	50	75	125
Steve Larmer	Chicago Blackhawks	1990–91	80	44	57	101
Pierre Larouche	Pittsburgh Penguins	1975–76	76	53	58	111
Vincent Lecavalier	Tampa Bay Lightning	2006–07	82	52	56	108
Brian Leetch	New York Rangers	1991–92	80	22	80	102
Mario Lemieux	Pittsburgh Penguins	1984–85	73	43	57	100
Mario Lemieux	Pittsburgh Penguins	1985–86	79	48	93	141
Mario Lemieux	Pittsburgh Penguins	1986–87	63	54	53	107
Mario Lemieux	Pittsburgh Penguins	1987–88	77	70	98	168
Mario Lemieux	Pittsburgh Penguins	1988–89	76	85	114	199
Mario Lemieux	Pittsburgh Penguins	1989–90	59	45	78	123
Mario Lemieux	Pittsburgh Penguins	1991–92	64	44	87	131
Mario Lemieux	Pittsburgh Penguins	1992–93	60	69	91	160
Mario Lemieux	Pittsburgh Penguins	1995–96	70	69	92	161
Mario Lemieux	Pittsburgh Penguins	1996–97	76	50	72	122
Eric Lindros	Philadelphia Flyers	1995–96	73	47	68	115
Hakan Loob	Calgary Flames	1987–88	80	50	56	106
Al MacInnis	Calgary Flames	1990–91	78	28	75	103
Nathan MacKinnon	Colorado Avalanche	2022–23	71	42	69	111
Nathan MacKinnon	Colorado Avalanche	2023–24	82	51	89	140
Nathan MacKinnon	Colorado Avalanche	2024–25	79	32	84	116
Nathan MacKinnon	Colorado Avalanche	2025–26	80	53	74	127
Paul MacLean	Winnipeg Jets (original)	1984–85	79	41	60	101
Rick MacLeish	Philadelphia Flyers	1972–73	78	50	50	100
Bob MacMillan	Atlanta Flames	1978–79	79	37	71	108
Pete Mahovlich	Montreal Canadiens	1974–75	80	35	82	117
Pete Mahovlich	Montreal Canadiens	1975–76	80	34	71	105
Evgeni Malkin	Pittsburgh Penguins	2007–08	82	47	59	106
Evgeni Malkin	Pittsburgh Penguins	2008–09	82	35	78	113
Evgeni Malkin	Pittsburgh Penguins	2011–12	75	50	59	109
Brad Marchand	Boston Bruins	2018–19	79	36	64	100
Mitch Marner	Toronto Maple Leafs	2024–25	81	27	75	102
Dennis Maruk	Washington Capitals	1981–82	80	60	76	136
Auston Matthews	Toronto Maple Leafs	2021–22	73	60	46	106
Auston Matthews	Toronto Maple Leafs	2023–24	81	69	38	107
Connor McDavid	Edmonton Oilers	2016–17	82	30	70	100
Connor McDavid	Edmonton Oilers	2017–18	82	41	67	108
Connor McDavid	Edmonton Oilers	2018–19	78	41	75	116
Connor McDavid	Edmonton Oilers	2020–21	56	33	72	105
Connor McDavid	Edmonton Oilers	2021–22	80	44	79	123
Connor McDavid	Edmonton Oilers	2022–23	82	64	89	153
Connor McDavid	Edmonton Oilers	2023–24	76	32	100	132
Connor McDavid	Edmonton Oilers	2024–25	67	26	74	100
Connor McDavid	Edmonton Oilers	2025–26	82	48	90	138
Mark Messier	Edmonton Oilers	1982–83	77	48	58	106
Mark Messier	Edmonton Oilers	1983–84	73	37	64	101
Mark Messier	Edmonton Oilers	1986–87	77	37	70	107
Mark Messier	Edmonton Oilers	1987–88	77	37	74	111
Mark Messier	Edmonton Oilers	1989–90	79	45	84	129
Mark Messier	New York Rangers	1991–92	79	35	72	107
Rick Middleton	Boston Bruins	1980–81	80	44	59	103
Rick Middleton	Boston Bruins	1983–84	80	47	58	105
J. T. Miller	Vancouver Canucks	2023–24	81	37	66	103
Alexander Mogilny	Buffalo Sabres	1992–93	77	76	51	127
Alexander Mogilny	Vancouver Canucks	1995–96	79	55	52	107
Joe Mullen	Calgary Flames	1988–89	79	51	59	110
Markus Naslund	Vancouver Canucks	2002–03	82	48	56	104
Mats Naslund	Montreal Canadiens	1985–86	80	43	67	110
Martin Necas	Colorado Avalanche	2025–26	78	38	62	100
Bernie Nicholls	Los Angeles Kings	1984–85	80	46	54	100
Bernie Nicholls	Los Angeles Kings	1988–89	79	70	80	150
Bernie Nicholls	Los Angeles Kings/New York Rangers	1989–90	79	39	73	112
Kent Nilsson	Calgary Flames	1980–81	80	49	82	131
Kent Nilsson	Calgary Flames	1982–83	80	48	56	104
Ryan Nugent-Hopkins	Edmonton Oilers	2022–23	82	37	67	104
Adam Oates	St. Louis Blues	1989–90	80	23	79	102
Adam Oates	St. Louis Blues	1990–91	61	25	90	115
Adam Oates	Boston Bruins	1992–93	84	45	97	142
Adam Oates	Boston Bruins	1993–94	77	32	80	112
John Ogrodnick	Detroit Red Wings	1984–85	79	55	50	105
Bobby Orr	Boston Bruins	1969–70	76	33	87	120
Bobby Orr	Boston Bruins	1970–71	78	37	102	139
Bobby Orr	Boston Bruins	1971–72	76	37	80	117
Bobby Orr	Boston Bruins	1972–73	63	29	72	101
Bobby Orr	Boston Bruins	1973–74	74	32	90	122
Bobby Orr	Boston Bruins	1974–75	80	46	89	135
Alexander Ovechkin	Washington Capitals	2005–06	81	52	54	106
Alexander Ovechkin	Washington Capitals	2007–08	82	65	47	112
Alexander Ovechkin	Washington Capitals	2008–09	79	56	54	110
Alexander Ovechkin	Washington Capitals	2009–10	72	50	59	109
Artemi Panarin	New York Rangers	2023–24	82	49	71	120
David Pastrnak	Boston Bruins	2022–23	82	61	52	113
David Pastrnak	Boston Bruins	2023–24	82	47	63	110
David Pastrnak	Boston Bruins	2024–25	82	43	63	106
David Pastrnak	Boston Bruins	2025–26	77	29	71	100
Barry Pederson	Boston Bruins	1982–83	77	46	61	107
Barry Pederson	Boston Bruins	1983–84	80	39	77	116
Gilbert Perreault	Buffalo Sabres	1975–76	80	44	69	113
Gilbert Perreault	Buffalo Sabres	1979–80	80	40	66	106
Elias Pettersson	Vancouver Canucks	2022–23	80	39	63	102
Denis Potvin	New York Islanders	1978–79	73	31	70	101
Jean Pronovost	Pittsburgh Penguins	1975–76	80	52	52	104
Mikko Rantanen	Colorado Avalanche	2022–23	82	55	50	105
Mikko Rantanen	Colorado Avalanche	2023–24	80	42	62	104
Jean Ratelle	New York Rangers	1971–72	63	46	63	109
Jean Ratelle	New York Rangers/Boston Bruins	1975–76	80	36	69	105
Mark Recchi	Pittsburgh Penguins	1990–91	78	40	73	113
Mark Recchi	Philadelphia Flyers	1992–93	84	53	70	123
Mark Recchi	Philadelphia Flyers	1993–94	84	40	67	107
Jacques Richard	Quebec Nordiques	1980–81	78	52	51	103
Rene Robert	Buffalo Sabres	1974–75	74	40	60	100
Jason Robertson	Dallas Stars	2022–23	82	46	63	109
Luc Robitaille	Los Angeles Kings	1987–88	80	53	58	111
Luc Robitaille	Los Angeles Kings	1989–90	80	52	49	101
Luc Robitaille	Los Angeles Kings	1991–92	80	44	63	107
Luc Robitaille	Los Angeles Kings	1992–93	84	63	62	125
Jeremy Roenick	Chicago Blackhawks	1991–92	80	53	50	103
Jeremy Roenick	Chicago Blackhawks	1992–93	84	50	57	107
Jeremy Roenick	Chicago Blackhawks	1993–94	84	46	61	107
Mike Rogers	Hartford Whalers	1979–80	80	44	61	105
Mike Rogers	Hartford Whalers	1980–81	80	40	65	105
Mike Rogers	New York Rangers	1981–82	80	38	65	103
Joe Sakic	Quebec Nordiques	1989–90	80	39	63	102
Joe Sakic	Quebec Nordiques	1990–91	80	48	61	109
Joe Sakic	Quebec Nordiques	1992–93	78	48	57	105
Joe Sakic	Colorado Avalanche	1995–96	82	51	69	120
Joe Sakic	Colorado Avalanche	2000–01	82	54	64	118
Joe Sakic	Colorado Avalanche	2006–07	82	36	64	100
Denis Savard	Chicago Blackhawks	1981–82	80	32	87	119
Denis Savard	Chicago Blackhawks	1982–83	78	35	86	121
Denis Savard	Chicago Blackhawks	1984–85	79	38	67	105
Denis Savard	Chicago Blackhawks	1985–86	80	47	69	116
Denis Savard	Chicago Blackhawks	1987–88	80	44	87	131
Mark Scheifele	Winnipeg Jets	2025–26	82	36	67	103
Daniel Sedin	Vancouver Canucks	2010–11	82	41	63	104
Henrik Sedin	Vancouver Canucks	2009–10	82	29	83	112
Teemu Selanne	Winnipeg Jets (original)	1992–93	84	76	56	132
Teemu Selanne	Winnipeg Jets (original)/Mighty Ducks of Anaheim	1995–96	79	40	68	108
Teemu Selanne	Mighty Ducks of Anaheim	1996–97	78	51	58	109
Teemu Selanne	Mighty Ducks of Anaheim	1998–99	75	47	60	107
Brendan Shanahan	St. Louis Blues	1993–94	81	52	50	102
Steve Shutt	Montreal Canadiens	1976–77	80	60	45	105
Charlie Simmer	Los Angeles Kings	1979–80	64	56	45	101
Charlie Simmer	Los Angeles Kings	1980–81	65	56	49	105
Darryl Sittler	Toronto Maple Leafs	1975–76	79	41	59	100
Darryl Sittler	Toronto Maple Leafs	1977–78	80	45	72	117
Bobby Smith	Minnesota North Stars	1981–82	80	43	71	114
Martin St. Louis	Tampa Bay Lightning	2006–07	82	43	59	102
Eric Staal	Carolina Hurricanes	2005–06	82	45	55	100
Steven Stamkos	Tampa Bay Lightning	2021–22	81	42	64	106
Peter Stastny	Quebec Nordiques	1980–81	77	39	70	109
Peter Stastny	Quebec Nordiques	1981–82	80	46	93	139
Peter Stastny	Quebec Nordiques	1982–83	75	47	77	124
Peter Stastny	Quebec Nordiques	1983–84	80	46	73	119
Peter Stastny	Quebec Nordiques	1984–85	75	32	68	100
Peter Stastny	Quebec Nordiques	1985–86	76	41	81	122
Peter Stastny	Quebec Nordiques	1987–88	76	46	65	111
Kevin Stevens	Pittsburgh Penguins	1991–92	80	54	69	123
Kevin Stevens	Pittsburgh Penguins	1992–93	72	55	56	111
Blaine Stoughton	Hartford Whalers	1979–80	80	56	44	100
Mats Sundin	Quebec Nordiques	1992–93	80	47	67	114
Brent Sutter	New York Islanders	1984–85	72	42	60	102
Nick Suzuki	Montreal Canadiens	2025–26	82	29	72	101
Dave Taylor	Los Angeles Kings	1980–81	72	47	65	112
Dave Taylor	Los Angeles Kings	1981–82	78	39	67	106
Joe Thornton	Boston Bruins	2002–03	77	36	65	101
Joe Thornton	Boston Bruins/San Jose Sharks	2005–06	81	29	96	125
Joe Thornton	San Jose Sharks	2006–07	82	22	92	114
Matthew Tkachuk	Calgary Flames	2021–22	82	42	62	104
Matthew Tkachuk	Florida Panthers	2022–23	79	40	69	109
Rick Tocchet	Pittsburgh Penguins	1992–93	80	48	61	109
John Tonelli	New York Islanders	1984–85	80	42	58	100
Bryan Trottier	New York Islanders	1977–78	77	46	77	123
Bryan Trottier	New York Islanders	1978–79	76	47	87	134
Bryan Trottier	New York Islanders	1979–80	78	42	62	104
Bryan Trottier	New York Islanders	1980–81	73	31	72	103
Bryan Trottier	New York Islanders	1981–82	80	50	79	129
Bryan Trottier	New York Islanders	1983–84	68	40	71	111
Pierre Turgeon	Buffalo Sabres	1989–90	80	40	66	106
Pierre Turgeon	New York Islanders	1992–93	83	58	74	132
Doug Weight	Edmonton Oilers	1995–96	82	25	79	104
Steve Yzerman	Detroit Red Wings	1987–88	64	50	52	102
Steve Yzerman	Detroit Red Wings	1988–89	80	65	90	155
Steve Yzerman	Detroit Red Wings	1989–90	79	62	65	127
Steve Yzerman	Detroit Red Wings	1990–91	80	51	57	108
Steve Yzerman	Detroit Red Wings	1991–92	79	45	58	103
Steve Yzerman	Detroit Red Wings	1992–93	84	58	79	137

== Most 100-point seasons ==
100-pt seasons	Player	Team(s)	Seasons
15	Wayne Gretzky	Edmonton Oilers (9), Los Angeles Kings (5), Los Angeles Kings/St. Louis Blues (1)	1979–80, 1980–81, 1981–82, 1982–83, 1983–84, 1984–85, 1985–86, 1986–87, 1987–88, 1988–89, 1989–90, 1990–91, 1991–92, 1993–94, 1995–96
10	Mario Lemieux	Pittsburgh Penguins	1984–85, 1985–86, 1986–87, 1987–88, 1988–89, 1989–90, 1991–92, 1992–93, 1995–96, 1996–97
9	Connor McDavid	Edmonton Oilers	2016–17, 2017–18, 2018–19, 2020–21, 2021–22, 2022–23, 2023–24, 2024–25, 2025–26
8	Marcel Dionne	Detroit Red Wings (1), Los Angeles Kings (7)	1974–75, 1976–77, 1978–79, 1979–80, 1980–81, 1981–82, 1982–83, 1984–85
7	Mike Bossy	New York Islanders	1978–79, 1980–81, 1981–82, 1982–83, 1983–84, 1984–85, 1985–86
7	Peter Stastny	Quebec Nordiques	1980–81, 1981–82, 1982–83, 1983–84, 1984–85, 1985–86, 1987–88
6	Phil Esposito	Boston Bruins	1968–69, 1970–71, 1971–72, 1972–73, 1973–74, 1974–75
6	Bobby Orr	Boston Bruins	1969–70, 1970–71, 1971–72, 1972–73, 1973–74, 1974–75
6	Guy Lafleur	Montreal Canadiens	1974–75, 1975–76, 1976–77, 1977–78, 1978–79, 1979–80
6	Bryan Trottier	New York Islanders	1977–78, 1978–79, 1979–80, 1980–81, 1981–82, 1983–84
6	Dale Hawerchuk	Winnipeg Jets (original)	1981–82, 1983–84, 1984–85, 1985–86, 1986–87, 1987–88
6	Jari Kurri	Edmonton Oilers	1982–83, 1983–84, 1984–85, 1985–86, 1986–87, 1988–89
6	Mark Messier	Edmonton Oilers (5), New York Rangers (1)	1982–83, 1983–84, 1986–87, 1987–88, 1989–90, 1991–92
6	Steve Yzerman	Detroit Red Wings	1987–88, 1988–89, 1989–90, 1990–91, 1991–92, 1992–93
6	Joe Sakic	Quebec Nordiques (3), Colorado Avalanche (3)	1989–90, 1990–91, 1992–93, 1995–96, 2000–01, 2006–07
6	Sidney Crosby	Pittsburgh Penguins	2005–06, 2006–07, 2008–09, 2009–10, 2013–14, 2018–19
6	Nikita Kucherov	Tampa Bay Lightning	2017–18, 2018–19, 2022–23, 2023–24, 2024–25, 2025–26
6	Leon Draisaitl	Edmonton Oilers	2018–19, 2019–20, 2021–22, 2022–23, 2023–24, 2024–25
