= Jacques Cossette =

Canadian ice hockey player (born 1954)

- Born: June 20, 1954 (age 70); Rouyn, Quebec, Canada
- Height: 5 ft 9 in (175 cm)
- Weight: 185 lb (84 kg; 13 st 3 lb)
- Position: Right Wing
- Shot: Right
- Played for: NHL; Pittsburgh Penguins; QMJHL; Montreal Jr Canadiens; Sorel Eperviers; AHL; Hershey Bears; Binghamton Dusters; Syracuse Firebirds
- NHL draft: 27th overall, 1974; Pittsburgh Penguins
- WHA draft: 20th overall, 1974; Vancouver Blazers
- Playing career: 1974–1980

Jacques Cossette (born June 20, 1954) is a Canadian retired ice hockey right winger. He played for the Pittsburgh Penguins of the NHL.

Born in Rouyn, Quebec, Cossete had a highly productive junior career, twice being named to the Quebec Major Junior Hockey League All-Star Team. Cossete's final year of junior, which was spent with the Sorel Black Hawks, saw him score 97 goals and 214 points.

Cossette was a second round selection of the Pittsburgh Penguins with whom he made his NHL debut during the 1975-76 season. Cossette played just 7 games with the Penguins but was able to register two assists in that time. He spent the entire 1976-77 season back in the minors with the Hershey Bears but he returned to the Penguins lineup during the 1977-78 season.

Jacques Cossette played 19 games with Pittsburgh and scored his first NHL goal that year while he also added two assists. In 1978-79 Cosette played 38 games and scored 7 goals and 9 points.

His final season came in 1979-80 when he played 78 games with the Syracuse Firebirds and scored 25 goals.

== Career statistics ==
			Regular Season					Playoffs
Season	Team	League	GP	G	A	Pts	PIM	GP	G	A	Pts	PIM
1971–72	Montreal Junior Canadiens	OHA	57	27	23	50	121	—	—	—	—	—
1972–73	Sorel Black Hawks	QMJHL	64	61	66	127	194	10	6	6	12	29
1973–74	Sorel Black Hawks	QMJHL	68	97	117	214	217	9	5	7	12	21
1974–75	Hershey Bears	AHL	62	15	17	32	92	5	1	1	2	0
1975–76	Hershey Bears	AHL	59	18	20	38	117	10	7	2	9	13
1975–76	Pittsburgh Penguins	NHL	7	0	2	2	9	—	—	—	—	—
1976–77	Hershey Bears	AHL	71	38	29	67	49	6	3	2	5	4
1977–78	Pittsburgh Penguins	NHL	19	1	2	3	4	—	—	—	—	—
1977–78	Binghamton Dusters	AHL	57	39	28	67	69	—	—	—	—	—
1978–79	Pittsburgh Penguins	NHL	38	7	2	9	16	3	0	1	1	4
1979–80	Syracuse Firebirds	AHL	78	25	23	48	87	4	1	0	1	2
NHL totals			64	8	6	14	29	3	0	1	1	4
