= Pierre Larouche =

Canadian ice hockey player (born 1955)

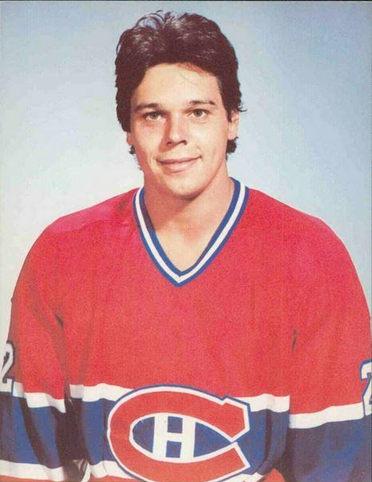
- Born: November 16, 1955 (age 70) Taschereau, Quebec, Canada
- Height: 5 ft 11 in (180 cm)
- Weight: 175 lb (79 kg; 12 st 7 lb)
- Position: Centre
- Shot: Right
- Played for: New York Rangers; Hartford Whalers; Montreal Canadiens; Pittsburgh Penguins
- National team: Canada
- NHL draft: 8th overall, 1974; Pittsburgh Penguins
- WHA draft: 30th overall, 1974; Houston Aeros
- Playing career: 1974–1988

Pierre Roland Larouche (born November 16, 1955) is a Canadian former professional ice hockey forward who played in the National Hockey League (NHL) for the Pittsburgh Penguins, Montreal Canadiens, Hartford Whalers, and New York Rangers between 1974 and 1988. He was a two-time Stanley Cup winner with the Canadiens.

== Hockey career ==
Larouche was one of ten children born to a retired railroad engineer in the Quebec hamlet of Amos, Quebec. As a youth, Larouche played in the 1965, 1966 and 1968 Quebec International Pee-Wee Hockey Tournaments with a minor ice hockey team from Amos.

Larouche played junior ice hockey with the Sorel Éperviers of the Quebec Major Junior Hockey League. During the 1973–74 QMJHL season, Larouche won the Jean Béliveau Trophy as the league's top scorer, with 94 goals, 157 assists, for a total 251 points. Larouche set the Canadian Hockey League record at the time, which is now second only to Mario Lemieux's 282 points ten years later.

Larouche was drafted 8th overall by the Penguins in the 1974 NHL amateur draft. In 1976, he became the 16th player to reach the 50-goal mark. At the time he was the youngest player to hit the 50-goal and 100-point plateau. His record was broken by Wayne Gretzky in 1980. He was first player to score 50 goals in a season for Pittsburgh (scoring 53 in 1975–76) and is the only NHL player to have scored more than 45 goals with three different teams, also scoring 50 with Montreal in 1979–80 and 48 with the New York Rangers in 1983-84.

Larouche is also one of the few players to score at least a point-per-game average in his final NHL season. He had 12 points in 10 games of the 1987–88 NHL season before a back injury suffered early in the season ultimately forced him to announce his retirement on September 14, 1988 at the age of 32. He won two Stanley Cups with Montreal, in 1978 and 1979.

A jokester in the locker room, he once was quoted as intending to quit hockey to become a drug dealer, much to the shock of a reporter that happened to be in the room. Reportedly, he once told teammates as a joke that as he was being paid $150,000 a year to score goals, "if they want me to play defense, they can pay me another $150,000." In the 2009 book 100 Ranger Greats, the authors ranked Larouche at No. 94 all-time of the 901 New York Rangers who had played during the team's first 82 seasons.

On December 31, 2010, he served as one of the coaches for the alumni game of the 2011 NHL Winter Classic at Heinz Field between the Penguins and Washington Capitals.

== Records and accomplishments ==
- He was the youngest player in NHL history to score 100 goals (21 years, 61 days) until he was surpassed by Wayne Gretzky (20 years, 40 days).
- He was the youngest player in NHL history to score 50 goals (20 years, 139 days) and 100 points (20 years, 129 days) in a season until he was passed by Wayne Gretzky in both categories.
- He was the youngest player in NHL history to score 200 points (21 years, 32 days) until he was surpassed by Wayne Gretzky (19 years, 347 days).
- He was the youngest player in NHL history to score 300 points (22 years, 133 days) until he was surpassed by Bryan Trottier (22 years, 102 days).
- Holds the Montreal Canadiens record for most goals in a season by a center with 50 goals in 1979-80
- Holds the New York Rangers record for most goals in a season by a center with 48 goals in 1983-84
- 1st player in NHL history to score 50 goals with 2 teams (PIT & MTL) as well as 45 goals with 3 teams (PIT, MTL & NYR).
- Held the QMJHL record for points in a season with 251 in 1973-74 until he was surpassed by Mario Lemieux with 282 points in 1983-84.
- Holds the QMJHL record for assists in a season with 157 in 1973-74

== Career statistics ==
=== Regular season and playoffs ===
			Regular season					Playoffs
Season	Team	League	GP	G	A	Pts	PIM	GP	G	A	Pts	PIM
1972–73	Quebec Remparts	QMJHL	20	6	7	13	20	—	—	—	—	—
1972–73	Sorel Black Hawks	QMJHL	43	47	54	101	24	10	7	6	13	2
1973–74	Sorel Black Hawks	QMJHL	67	94	157	251	53	13	15	18	33	20
1974–75	Pittsburgh Penguins	NHL	79	31	37	68	52	9	2	5	7	2
1975–76	Pittsburgh Penguins	NHL	76	53	58	111	33	3	0	1	1	0
1976–77	Pittsburgh Penguins	NHL	65	29	34	63	14	3	0	3	3	0
1977–78	Pittsburgh Penguins	NHL	20	6	5	11	0	—	—	—	—	—
1977–78	Montreal Canadiens	NHL	44	17	32	49	11	5	2	1	3	4
1978–79	Montreal Canadiens	NHL	36	9	13	22	4	6	1	3	4	0
1979–80	Montreal Canadiens	NHL	73	50	41	91	16	9	1	7	8	2
1980–81	Montreal Canadiens	NHL	61	25	28	53	28	2	0	2	2	0
1981–82	Montreal Canadiens	NHL	22	9	12	21	0	—	—	—	—	—
1981–82	Hartford Whalers	NHL	45	25	25	50	12	—	—	—	—	—
1982–83	Hartford Whalers	NHL	38	18	22	40	8	—	—	—	—	—
1983–84	New York Rangers	NHL	77	48	33	81	22	5	3	1	4	2
1984–85	New York Rangers	NHL	65	24	36	60	8	—	—	—	—	—
1985–86	Hershey Bears	AHL	32	22	17	39	16	—	—	—	—	—
1985–86	New York Rangers	NHL	28	20	7	27	4	16	8	9	17	2
1986–87	New York Rangers	NHL	73	28	35	63	12	6	3	2	5	4
1987–88	New York Rangers	NHL	10	3	9	12	13	—	—	—	—	—
NHL totals			812	395	427	822	237	64	20	34	54	16

=== International ===
Year	Team	Event	GP	G	A	Pts	PIM
1977	Canada	WC	10	7	8	15	16

== Golf career ==
After retiring from hockey, Larouche took up golf. He was a winning player on the Celebrity Player Tour and he nearly qualified for the U. S. Open in 1993.

== See also ==
- List of NHL players with 100-point seasons

Preceded by Blaine Stoughton	Pittsburgh Penguins first-round draft pick 1974	Succeeded by Gordon Laxton
