= 1972–73 QMJHL season =

Canadian junior ice hockey season

The 1972–73 QMJHL season was the fourth season in the history of the Quebec Major Junior Hockey League. The summer of 1972 saw the departure of the Saint-Jérôme Alouettes and the Verdun Maple Leafs from the league, reducing the circuit to eight teams. In an off-season lawsuit between the QMJHL and the OHA, the QMJHL gained a team, when the Montreal Junior Canadiens transferred leagues.

Michel Brière Memorial Trophy is first awarded to the league's most valuable player in honour of Michel Brière, who was killed in a car accident. Nine teams played 64 games each in the schedule. The Quebec Remparts finished first place in the regular season, and won the President's Cup, defeating the Cornwall Royals in the finals.

== Team changes ==
- The Saint-Jérôme Alouettes cease operations.
- The Verdun Maple Leafs cease operations.
- The Montreal Junior Canadiens transfer from the Ontario Hockey Association to play in the QMJHL as the Montreal Bleu Blanc Rouge.

== Final standings ==
Note: GP = Games played; W = Wins; L = Losses; T = Ties; Pts = Points; GF = Goals for; GA = Goals against

Overall	GP	W	L	T	Pts	GF	GA
Quebec Remparts	64	49	11	4	102	448	230
Cornwall Royals	64	43	19	2	88	365	253
Sorel Éperviers	64	38	23	3	79	398	362
Shawinigan Bruins	64	28	34	2	70	301	278
Sherbrooke Castors	64	28	34	2	58	278	309
Laval National	64	28	35	1	57	301	377
Montreal Bleu Blanc Rouge	64	26	35	3	55	297	319
Trois-Rivières Ducs	64	18	44	2	38	294	372
Drummondville Rangers	64	14	49	1	29	292	474

- complete list of standings.

== Scoring leaders ==
Note: GP = Games played; G = Goals; A = Assists; Pts = Points; PIM = Penalties in minutes

Player	Team	GP	G	A	Pts	PIM
Andre Savard	Quebec Remparts	56	67	84	151	147
Jacques Locas	Quebec Remparts	62	68	75	143	79
Pierre Laganiere	Sherbrooke Castors	61	45	86	131	32
Guy Chouinard	Quebec Remparts	59	43	86	129	11
Jacques Cossette	Sorel Éperviers	64	61	66	127	194
Yvon Dupuis	Quebec Remparts	62	50	76	126	56
Dennis Desgagnes	Sorel Éperviers	60	48	75	123	78
Michel Deziel	Sorel Éperviers	64	50	72	122	49
Pierre Larouche	Sorel Éperviers	63	52	62	114	44
Claude Larose	Drummondville Rangers	61	63	50	113	12

- complete scoring statistics

== Playoffs ==
Andre Savard was the leading scorer of the playoffs with 42 points (18 goals, 24 assists).

Quarterfinals

- Quebec Remparts defeated Trois-Rivières Ducs 4 games to 0.
- Cornwall Royals defeated Montreal Bleu Blanc Rouge 4 games to 0.
- Sorel Éperviers defeated Laval National 4 games to 1.
- Sherbrooke Castors defeated Shawinigan Bruins 4 games to 0.

Semifinals

- Quebec Remparts defeated Sherbrooke Castors 4 games to 0.
- Cornwall Royals defeated Sorel Éperviers 4 games to 1.

Finals

- Quebec Remparts defeated Cornwall Royals 4 games to 3.

== All-star teams ==
First team

- Goaltender - Paul-Andre Touzin, Shawinigan Bruins
- Left defence - Al Sims, Cornwall Royals
- Right defence - Jean Landry, Quebec Remparts
- Left winger - Francois Rochon, Sherbrooke Castors
- Centreman - Andre Savard, Quebec Remparts
- Right winger - Jacques Cossette, Sorel Éperviers
- Coach - Claude Dolbec, Shawinigan Bruins

Second team

- Goaltender - Andre Lepage, Drummondville Rangers
- Left defence - Jean-Pierre Burgoyne, Shawinigan Bruins
- Right defence - Jean Bernier, Shawinigan Bruins
- Left winger - Claude Larose, Drummondville Rangers
- Centreman - Denis Desgagnes, Sorel Éperviers
- Right winger - Blair MacDonald, Cornwall Royals
- Coach - Orval Tessier, Quebec Remparts
- List of First/Second/Rookie team all-stars.

== Trophies and awards ==
Team

- President's Cup - Playoff Champions, Quebec Remparts
- Jean Rougeau Trophy - Regular Season Champions, Quebec Remparts

Player

- Michel Brière Memorial Trophy - Most Valuable Player, Andre Savard, Quebec Remparts
- Jean Béliveau Trophy - Top Scorer, Andre Savard, Quebec Remparts
- Jacques Plante Memorial Trophy - Best GAA, Pierre Perusse, Quebec Remparts
- Michel Bergeron Trophy - Rookie of the Year, Pierre Larouche, Sorel Éperviers
- Frank J. Selke Memorial Trophy - Most sportsmanlike player, Claude Larose, Drummondville Rangers

== See also ==
- 1973 Memorial Cup
- 1973 NHL entry draft
- 1972–73 OHA season
- 1972–73 WCHL season

Preceded by 1971–72 QMJHL season	QMJHL seasons	Succeeded by 1973–74 QMJHL season
