= Quebec Maritimes Junior Hockey League =

Junior ice hockey league in Canada

Quebec Maritimes Junior Hockey League Ligue de hockey junior Maritimes Québec
- Current season, competition or edition: 2026–27 QMJHL season
- Sport: Ice hockey
- Founded: 1969
- Founder: Robert Lebel
- President: Mario Cecchini
- No. of teams: 18
- Country: Canada
- Most recent champion: Chicoutimi Saguenéens (3)
- Most titles: Gatineau Olympiques (7)
- Broadcasters: Sportsnet; Sportsnet One; Eastlink TV; TVA Sports
- Website: theqmjhl.ca

The Quebec Maritimes Junior Hockey League (QMJHL; French: Ligue de hockey junior Maritimes Québec, LHJMQ), formerly the Quebec Major Junior Hockey League is one of the three major junior ice hockey leagues that constitute the Canadian Hockey League (CHL), alongside the Ontario Hockey League and the Western Hockey League. The league includes teams in Quebec, Newfoundland and Labrador, and the Maritime provinces of New Brunswick, Nova Scotia, and Prince Edward Island, and previously had teams in Maine and New York in the United States.

The Gilles-Courteau Trophy is the championship trophy of the league. The QMJHL champion then goes on to compete in the Memorial Cup against the Ontario Hockey League (OHL) and Western Hockey League (WHL) champions, and the CHL host team. The QMJHL had traditionally adopted a rapid and offensive style of hockey. Former QMJHL players hold many of the Canadian Hockey League's career and single season offensive records.

Hockey Hall of Fame alumni of the QMJHL include Mario Lemieux, Guy Lafleur, Ray Bourque, Pat LaFontaine, Mike Bossy, Denis Savard, Michel Goulet, Luc Robitaille, and goaltenders Patrick Roy, Martin Brodeur, and Roberto Luongo.

== Teams ==
- Maritimes Division
- East Division Central Division
- West Division

Overview of QMJHL teams
Conference	Division	Team	City	Arena
Eastern	East	Baie-Comeau Drakkar	Baie-Comeau, Quebec	Centre Henry-Leonard
Eastern	East	Chicoutimi Saguenéens	Saguenay, Quebec	Centre Georges-Vézina
Eastern	East	Quebec Remparts	Quebec City, Quebec	Centre Vidéotron
Eastern	East	Rimouski Océanic	Rimouski, Quebec	Colisée Financière Sun Life
Eastern	Maritimes	Cape Breton Eagles	Cape Breton Regional Municipality, Nova Scotia	Centre 200
Eastern	Maritimes	Charlottetown Islanders	Charlottetown, Prince Edward Island	Eastlink Centre
Eastern	Maritimes	Halifax Mooseheads	Halifax, Nova Scotia	Scotiabank Centre
Eastern	Maritimes	Moncton Wildcats	Moncton, New Brunswick	Avenir Centre
Eastern	Maritimes	Newfoundland Regiment	St. John's, Newfoundland and Labrador	Mary Brown's Centre
Eastern	Maritimes	Saint John Sea Dogs	Saint John, New Brunswick	TD Station
Western	Central	Drummondville Voltigeurs	Drummondville, Quebec	Centre Marcel Dionne
Western	Central	Shawinigan Cataractes	Shawinigan, Quebec	Centre Gervais Auto
Western	Central	Sherbrooke Phoenix	Sherbrooke, Quebec	Palais des Sports
Western	Central	Victoriaville Tigres	Victoriaville, Quebec	Colisée Desjardins
Western	West	Blainville-Boisbriand Armada	Boisbriand, Quebec	Centre d'Excellence Sports Rousseau
Western	West	Gatineau Olympiques	Gatineau, Quebec	Centre Slush Puppie
Western	West	Rouyn-Noranda Huskies	Rouyn-Noranda, Quebec	Aréna Glencore
Western	West	Val-d'Or Foreurs	Val-d'Or, Quebec	Centre Agnico Eagle

== History ==
The Quebec Major Junior Hockey League was founded in 1969, through the merger of the best teams from the existing Quebec Junior Hockey League and the Metropolitan Montreal Junior Hockey League, declaring themselves a "major junior" league. Of the original eleven QMJHL teams, eight came from the QJHL, two from the MMJHL, and the Cornwall Royals, from Cornwall, Ontario, near the Quebec border, who transferred from the Central Junior A Hockey League. The Rosemont National and Laval Saints transferred from the MMJHL. The eight teams from the QJHL were the Drummondville Rangers, Quebec Remparts, Saint-Jérôme Alouettes, Shawinigan Bruins, Sherbrooke Castors, Sorel Éperviers, Trois-Rivières Ducs and the Verdun Maple Leafs.

Most of the teams were within a few hours' drive of Montreal. From the first season in 1969–70, only Shawinigan remains in the same city with an uninterrupted history, although the team's name has changed to the Cataractes.

In 1972 the QMJHL had been in operation for three years, and wanted a team in the province's largest city. It threatened a lawsuit to force the Montreal Junior Canadiens of the Ontario Hockey Association into the Quebec-based league. Over the summer of 1972, the OHA granted the Junior Habs a "one-year suspension" of operations, while team ownership transferred the team and players into the QMJHL, renaming themselves the Montreal Bleu Blanc Rouge in the process. The OHA then reactivated the suspended franchise for the 1973–74 season in Kingston, Ontario, under new ownership and with new players, calling the team the Kingston Canadians.

QMJHL teams have won the Memorial Cup twelve times since 1969, with the Shawinigan Cataractes, Saint John Sea Dogs, the Granby Prédateurs, the Hull Olympiques, Halifax Mooseheads, Rouyn-Noranda Huskies, Rimouski Océanic, and the Acadie-Bathurst Titan each winning once, the Quebec Remparts winning three times(once in their first edition 1969–1985, and twice in their second edition 1997–present) and the Cornwall Royals winning three times.

Starting in 1994, the QMJHL began to expand farther east, outside of Quebec, filling the void in Atlantic Canada after the exodus of American Hockey League franchises, when the AHL had a strong presence in the 1980s and 1990s; all of the Maritime Division cities save for Bathurst, New Brunswick are former homes of AHL franchises. To date, Fredericton, New Brunswick is the lone former AHL market that has not established a QMJHL franchise.

In recent seasons, the QMJHL has been scouting players from the Atlantic Canada region along with a surge in players coming out of the New England area: the QMJHL has territorial rights to draft and recruit players from New England as part of an agreement where players from the United States can be drafted by the CHL league that is in a similar geographic area.

On March 14, 2021, Kenzie Lalonde became the first woman to provide play-by-play coverage on television for any QMJHL game; the game was between the Halifax Mooseheads, who were hosting, and the Charlottetown Islanders.

In December 2023, the QMJHL changed its name to the Quebec Maritimes Junior Hockey League and released a new logo. The change recognized the league's expansion into the Maritime provinces, whose teams had been a part of the QMJHL for almost 30 years.

The Newfoundland and Labrador House of Assembly amended labour laws in 2024, to consider junior players as student-athletes and not employees subject to minimum wage, similarly to other provinces in the league. The QMJHL returned to Newfoundland for the 2025–26 season, with the relocation of the Acadie-Bathurst Titan to St. John's as the Newfoundland Regiment.

=== Retired numbers ===
League-wide retired numbers
No.	Player	Position	QMJHL Career	No. retirement
4	Guy Lafleur	RW	1966–1971	September 2021
87	Sidney Crosby	C	2003–2005	27 September 2019

=== League presidents ===
- Robert Lebel (1969–1975)
- Jean Rougeau (1981–1983)
- Paul Dumont (1983–1984)
- Gilles Courteau (1986–2023)
- Mario Cecchini (2023–present)

=== Canadian Hockey League records ===
This is a list of Canadian Hockey League career and single season records accomplished by QMJHL players.

Most goals, career
1st – 309 – Mike Bossy, Laval National (1972–77)
2nd – 281 – Stephane Lebeau, Shawinigan Cataractes (1984–88)
3rd – 278 – Normand Dupont, Montreal Bleu Blanc Rouge, Montreal Juniors (1973–77)
10th – 247 – Mario Lemieux, Laval Voisins (1981–84)

Most assists, career
1st – 408 – Patrice Lefebvre, Shawinigan Cataractes (1984–88)
3rd – 346 – Patrick Emond, Trois-Rivières Draveurs, Hull Olympiques, Chicoutimi Saguenéens (1981–86)
7th – 315 – Mario Lemieux, Laval Voisins (1981–84)

Most points, career
1st – 595 – Patrice Lefebvre, Shawinigan Cataractes (1984–88)
3rd – 580 – Stephane Lebeau, Shawinigan Cataractes (1984–88)
4th – 575 – Patrick Emond, Trois-Rivières Draveurs, Hull Olympiques, Chicoutimi Saguenéens (1981–86)
7th – 562 – Mario Lemieux, Laval Voisins (1981–84)
11th – 532 – Mike Bossy, Laval National (1972–77)

Most goals, one season
1st – 133 – Mario Lemieux, Laval Voisins, 1983–84 (70 games)
2nd – 130 – Guy Lafleur, Quebec Remparts, 1970–71 (62 games)
4th – 104 – Pat LaFontaine, Verdun Juniors, 1982–83 (70 games)
5th – 103 – Guy Lafleur, Quebec Remparts, 1969–70 (56 games)
6th – 100 – Gary MacGregor, Cornwall Royals, 1973–74 (66 games)

Most assists, one season
1st – 157 – Pierre Larouche, Sorel Éperviers, 1973–74 (70 games)
2nd – 149 – Mario Lemieux, Laval Voisins, 1983–84 (70 games)
3rd – 136 – Patrice Lefebvre, Shawinigan Cataractes, 1987–88 (70 games)
5th – 135 – Michel Deziel, Sorel Éperviers, 1973–74 (69 games)
5th – 135 – Marc Fortier, Chicoutimi Saguenéens, 1986–87 (65 games)

Most points, one season
1st – 282 – Mario Lemieux, Laval Voisins, 1983–84 (70 games)
2nd – 251 – Pierre Larouche, Sorel Éperviers, 1973–74 (67 games)
3rd – 234 – Pat LaFontaine, Verdun Juniors, 1982–83 (70 games)
4th – 227 – Michel Deziel, Sorel Éperviers, 1973–74 (69 games)
5th – 216 – Real Cloutier, Quebec Remparts, 1973–74 (69 games)
6th – 214 – Jacques Cossette, Sorel Éperviers, 1973–74 (68 games)
8th – 209 – Guy Lafleur, Quebec Remparts, 1970–71 (62 games)
9th – 206 – Jacques Locas, Quebec Remparts, 1973–74 (63 games)
10th – 201 – Marc Fortier, Chicoutimi Saguenéens, 1986–87 (65 games)
11th – 200 – Patrice Lefebvre, Shawinigan Cataractes, 1987–88 (70 games)

=== Timeline of teams ===
Current teams are shown in blue. Gold stars denote Gilles-Courteau Trophy (League championship) winners.

This is a complete list of team histories since 1969.

- 1969– First season, 2 divisions. East: Quebec City Remparts, Shawinigan Bruins, Drummondville Rangers, Sorel Éperviers (Black Hawks), Trois-Rivières Ducs (Dukes), and Sherbrooke Castors (Beavers). West: Saint-Jérôme Alouettes, Cornwall Royals, Rosemont National, Verdun Maple Leafs, and Laval Saints.
- 1970– Divisions dissolved, Laval folds.
- 1971– Rosemont National move to Laval.
- 1972– The Saint-Jérôme Alouettes and the Verdun Maple Leafs fold. The Montreal Junior Canadiens franchise of the OHA transfers to QMJHL, becoming the Montreal Bleu Blanc Rouge.
- 1973– League split into two divisions. East: Sorel, Quebec, Shawinigan, Trois-Rivières, Chicoutimi; West: Cornwall, Montreal, Sherbrooke, Laval, Drummondville, Hull. Chicoutimi Saguenéens, and the Hull Festivals granted franchises. Shawinigan Bruins become Shawinigan Dynamos.
- 1974– Drummondville Rangers fold, Trois-Rivières Ducs become Trois-Rivières Draveurs (Raftmen).
- 1975– Montreal Bleu Blanc Rouge became Montreal Juniors.
- 1976– Hull Festivals became Hull Olympiques. Divisions renamed: East becomes Dilio, West becomes Lebel.
- 1977– Sorel Éperviers (Black Hawks) move to Verdun. Sherbrooke moved to Dilio Division, while Verdun played in the Lebel.
- 1978– Shawinigan Dynamos became Shawinigan Cataractes.
- 1979– Verdun Éperviers (Black Hawks) became Sorel/Verdun Éperviers. Laval National become Laval Voisins.
- 1980– Sorel/Verdun Éperviers became Sorel Éperviers.
- 1981– Divisions cease to exist, Cornwall moved to the OHL, Sorel Éperviers moved to Granby and became the Bisons.
- 1982– Lebel and Dilio Divisions reintroduced. Shawinigan, Chicoutimi, Trois-Rivières, Quebec, and Drummondville played in the Dilio, while Laval, Verdun, Longueuil, Saint-Jean, Hull, and Granby played in the Lebel. Sherbrooke Castors moved to Saint-Jean. Montreal Juniors moved to Verdun. Drummondville Voltigeurs (Infantrymen) granted a franchise, Longueuil Chevaliers (Cavaliers) granted a franchise.
- 1984– Plattsburgh Pioneers granted a franchise, but folded three months into the schedule after playing 17 games. They played in the Lebel Division, Granby is moved to the Dilio. Verdun Juniors become the Verdun Junior Canadiens.
- 1985– Quebec Remparts fold. Laval Voisins became Laval Titan.
- 1987– Longueuil Chevaliers moved to Victoriaville and became the Tigres. They played in the Dilio. Granby was moved to the Lebel Division.
- 1988– Divisions ceased to exist, Longueuil Collège-Français are granted the rights to resurrect the Quebec Remparts franchise.
- 1989– Verdun Junior Canadiens moved to Saint-Hyacinthe and became the Laser. Saint-Jean Castors became St-Jean Lynx.
- 1990– Lebel and Dilio divisions created yet again: Chicoutimi, Trois-Rivières, Drummondville, Shawinigan, Beauport, and Victoriaville play in the Dilio; Longueuil, Hull, Laval, Saint-Hyacinthe, Granby, and Saint-Jean played in the Lebel. Beauport Harfangs was granted a franchise.
- 1991– Longueuil Collège-Français moved to Verdun.
- 1992– Trois-Rivières Draveurs moved to Sherbrooke and became the Faucons.
- 1993– Val-d'Or granted a franchise, named the Foreurs. They played in the Lebel.
- 1994– Verdun Collège-Français folded. Halifax awarded an expansion team, the Mooseheads. Halifax played in the Dilio. Laval Titan became Laval Titan Collège-Français.
- 1995– Saint-Jean Lynx moved to Rimouski and become the Océanic. Moncton Alpines franchise granted. Rimouski and Moncton both played in the Dilio. Drummondville and Sherbrooke moved to the Lebel. Granby Bisons became Granby Prédateurs.
- 1996– Saint-Hyacinthe Laser moved to Rouyn-Noranda and became the Huskies. Moncton Alpines became Moncton Wildcats.
- 1997– Granby Prédateurs move to Cape Breton and became the Screaming Eagles. They played in the Dilio. Shawinigan moved to the Lebel. The Beauport Harfangs moved to Quebec City and became the Quebec Remparts. Baie-Comeau was granted an expansion team called the Drakkar and played in the Dilio.
- 1998– Laval Titan Collège-Français moved to Acadie-Bathurst, and played in the Dilio.
- 1999– Lebel Division became Lebel Conference, and split into the West Division (Hull, Rouyn-Noranda, Montreal, Val-d'Or) and the Central Division (Shawinigan, Drummondville, Sherbrooke, Victoriaville). The Dilio Division became the Dilio Conference and split into the Eastern Division (Rimouski, Quebec City, Baie-Comeau, Chicoutimi) and the Maritime Division (Moncton, Halifax, Cape Breton, Acadie-Bathurst). Montreal Rocket was granted a franchise.
- 2003– The QMJHL switched to a three-division format: Atlantic (Cape Breton, Moncton, Prince Edward Island, Halifax, Acadie-Bathurst); Eastern (Rimouski, Chicoutimi, Lewiston, Quebec, Baie-Comeau); and Western (Gatineau, Shawinigan, Rouyn-Noranda, Val-d'Or, Drummondville, Victoriaville). Sherbrooke Castors moved to Maine, becoming the Lewiston Maineiacs; Montreal Rocket moved to Charlottetown and took the Prince Edward Island name, Hull Olympiques become Gatineau Olympiques.
- 2004– The QMJHL announced plans to expand from 16 to 18 teams, effective with the 2005–06 season. St. John's, Newfoundland and Labrador and Saint John, New Brunswick were awarded franchises, the St. John's Fog Devils and Saint John Sea Dogs respectively.
- 2005– Effective with the 2005–06 season, the league reverted to a two-division format. The East Division consisted of all of the league's non-Québec teams, and the West Division contained all of the Quebec teams.
- 2006– The Western Division was renamed the Telus Division, under a sponsorship agreement with the Telus Communications Corporation.
- 2008– The St. John's Fog Devils relocated to Verdun, Quebec to become the Montreal Junior Hockey Club.
- 2011– The Lewiston Maineiacs were purchased by the league and were dissolved. The remaining roster that's still eligible to play in the QMJHL was claimed by the remaining teams in a dispersal draft.
- 2011– The Montreal Junior Hockey Club was sold to a group led by former NHL Defencemen Joel Bouchard and renamed the Blainville-Boisbriand Armada.
- 2012– Sherbrooke permitted to resurrect the former Lewiston franchise as the Phoenix.
- 2013– The PEI Rocket changed their franchise name to the Charlottetown Islanders.
- 2020– League returns to a three-division format.
- 2025– The Acadie-Bathurst Titan relocated to St. John's, Newfoundland to become the Newfoundland Regiment.

=== Cities represented ===
Team	Hometown	Province/State	Years active
Cornwall Royals	Cornwall	Ontario	1969–1981
Plattsburgh Pioneers	Plattsburgh	New York	1984–1985
Laval Titan	Laval	Quebec	1969–1970; 1971–1998
Quebec Remparts	Quebec City	Quebec	1969–1985; 1997–present
Drummondville Voltigeurs	Drummondville	Quebec	1969–1974; 1982–present
Saint-Jerome Alouettes	Saint-Jerome	Quebec	1969–1971
Trois-Rivieres Draveurs	Trois-Rivieres	Quebec	1969–1992
Sorel Eperviers	Sorel	Quebec	1969–1977; 1980–1981
Verdun Juniors; Montreal Junior Hockey Club	Verdun	Quebec	1969–1971; 1977–1980; 1982–1989; 1991–1994; 2008–2011; 2008–2011
Montreal Bleu Blanc Rouge; Montreal Juniors; Montreal Rocket	Montreal	Quebec	1969–1971; 1972–1982; 1999–2003
Shawinigan Cataractes	Shawinigan	Quebec	1969–present
Sherbrooke Phoenix; Sherbrooke Castors; Sherbrooke Faucons	Sherbrooke	Quebec	1969–1982; 1999–2003; 2012–present
Chicoutimi Saguenéens	Chicoutimi	Quebec	1973–present
Gatineau Olympiques	Hull/Gatineau	Quebec	1973–present
Granby Prédateurs	Granby	Quebec	1981–1997
Saint-Jean Lynx	Saint-Jean-sur-Richelieu	Quebec	1982–1995
Longueuil Chevaliers	Longueuil	Quebec	1982–1991
Victoriaville Tigres	Victoriaville	Quebec	1987–present
Saint-Hyacinthe Laser	Saint-Hyacinthe	Quebec	1989–1996
Beauport Harfangs	Beauport	Quebec	1990–1997
Val-d'Or Foreurs	Val-d'Or	Quebec	1993–present
Rimouski Océanic	Rimouski	Quebec	1995–present
Rouyn-Noranda Huskies	Rouyn-Noranda	Quebec	1996–present
Baie-Comeau Drakkar	Baie-Comeau	Quebec	1997–present
Blainville-Boisbriand Armada	Boisbriand	Quebec	2011–present
Moncton Wildcats	Moncton	New Brunswick	1995–present
Acadie-Bathurst Titan	Bathurst	New Brunswick	1998–2025
Saint John Sea Dogs	Saint John	New Brunswick	2005–present
Lewiston Maineiacs	Lewiston	Maine	2003–2011
Charlottetown Islanders	Charlottetown	Prince Edward Island	2003–present
Halifax Mooseheads	Halifax	Nova Scotia	1994–present
Cape Breton Eagles	Sydney	Nova Scotia	1997–present
St. John's Fog Devils; Newfoundland Regiment	St. John's	Newfoundland and Labrador	2005–2008, 2025–present

== Memorial Cup champions ==
The Memorial Cup has been captured fifteen times by ten different QMJHL teams since the league's founding in 1969:

- 1971 – Quebec Remparts (1)
- 1972 – Cornwall Royals (1)
- 1980 – Cornwall Royals (2)
- 1981 – Cornwall Royals (3)
- 1996 – Granby Prédateurs (1)
- 1997 – Hull Olympiques (1)
- 2000 – Rimouski Océanic (1)
- 2006 – Quebec Remparts (2)
- 2011 – Saint John Sea Dogs (1)
- 2012 – Shawinigan Cataractes (1)
- 2013 – Halifax Mooseheads (1)
- 2018 – Acadie–Bathurst Titan (1)
- 2019 – Rouyn-Noranda Huskies (1)
- 2022 – Saint John Sea Dogs (2)
- 2023 – Quebec Remparts (3)

== Entry draft ==
Starting in 1971, the QMJHL has held a draft to select the rights to future players. The league held separate drafts for junior-aged players and for midget-aged players. The initial drafts addressed only players not protected by their territorial programs. In 1972, teams could protect 15 players within their territory, and Mike Bossy was never drafted because the Laval National protected him. In 1973, the midget protection was dropped to five players, then increased to six players in 1976. The territorial rights created issues in 1973, when the Sorel Éperviers picked Lucien DeBlois with the first pick, and the Drummondville Voltigeurs selected him with the 8th pick because he also was within their region. The last year of separate drafts for midget and junior players was 1977, when teams were allowed to protect one midget player. Starting in 1978, the league had a single draft.

== Trophies and awards ==
This is a list of QMJHL trophies. The trophy's first season being awarded is shown in brackets.

=== Team ===
- Gilles-Courteau Trophy – Playoffs champions (1969–70)
- Jean Rougeau Trophy – Regular season champions (1969–70)
- Luc Robitaille Trophy – Team that scored the most goals (2001–02 to 2013–14), team with the best goals for average (2014–15)
- Robert Lebel Trophy – Team with best GAA (1977–78)

=== Player ===
- Michel Brière Memorial Trophy – Most valuable player (1972–73)
- Jean Béliveau Trophy – Top scorer (1969–70)
- Guy Lafleur Trophy – Playoffs MVP (1977–78)
- Jacques Plante Memorial Trophy – Best GAA (1969–70)
- Patrick Roy Trophy – Goaltender of the year (2023–24)
- Guy Carbonneau Trophy – Best defensive forward (2004–05)
- Emile Bouchard Trophy – Defenceman of the year (1975–76)
- Kevin Lowe Trophy – Best defensive defenceman (2004–05)
- Michael Bossy Trophy – Best professional prospect (1980–81)
- Sidney Crosby Trophy – Rookie of the year (1991–92)
- Michel Bergeron Trophy – Offensive rookie of the year (1969–70)
- Raymond Lagacé Trophy – Defensive rookie of the year (1980–81)
- David Desharnais Trophy (Note: Trophy was previously known as the Frank J. Selke Memorial Trophy in recognition of National Hockey League general manager and Hockey Hall of Fame inductee Frank J. Selke prior to the 2024–25 season.) – Most sportsmanlike player (1969–70)
- QMJHL Humanitarian of the Year – Also known as "Wittnauer Plaque" (1992–93)
- Marcel Robert Trophy – Best scholastic player (1980–81)
- Paul Dumont Trophy – Personality of the year (1989–90)

=== Executive ===
- Ron Lapointe Trophy – Coach of the year (1992–93)
- Maurice Filion Trophy – General manager of the year (2005–06)
- John Horman Trophy – Executive of the year (1989–90)
- Jean Sawyer Trophy – Marketing director of the year (1990–91)

=== Defunct trophies ===
- AutoPro Plaque – Best plus/minus total (1989–90 to 2001–02)
- Philips Plaque – Best faceoff percentage (1997–98 to 2001–02)
- Telus Cup – Offensive – Offensive player of the year (1989–90 to 2005–06)
- Telus Cup – Defensive – Defensive player of the year (1989–90 to 2005–06)

== See also ==
- List of ice hockey leagues
- List of QMJHL seasons
- CHL USA Prospects Challenge
