= Paul Boutilier =

Canadian ice hockey player (1963–2026)

- Born: May 3, 1963 Sydney, Nova Scotia, Canada
- Died: May 14, 2026 (aged 63) Halifax, Nova Scotia, Canada
- Height: 6 ft 0 in (183 cm)
- Weight: 200 lb (91 kg; 14 st 4 lb)
- Position: Defence
- Shot: Left
- Played for: New York Islanders; Boston Bruins; Minnesota North Stars; New York Rangers; Winnipeg Jets
- National team: Canada
- NHL draft: 21st overall, 1981; New York Islanders
- Playing career: 1982–1989

Paul André Boutilier (May 3, 1963 – May 14, 2026) was a Canadian professional ice hockey defenceman who played with several National Hockey League teams in the 1980s. He was a member of the 1983 Stanley Cup champion New York Islanders.

== Playing career ==
Boutilier was born in Sydney, Nova Scotia. He starred in the QMJHL with the Sherbrooke Castors in the early 1980s. In 1982, he helped the team reach the Memorial Cup finals, however, the Castors lost to the Kitchener Rangers. Boutilier was named to the tournament all-star team, and was voted a first-team all-star by the QMJHL. Chosen 21st overall by the New York Islanders in the 1981 NHL entry draft (ahead of such future NHL stars as Chris Chelios and John Vanbiesbrouck), Boutilier split his first full pro season between the Islanders and the CHL's Indianapolis Checkers. He did, however, have his name inscribed on the Stanley Cup in 1983 after appearing in two playoff games for the champion Isles. He also attended McGill University during the offseasons.

Boutilier became a regular on the Islanders' blueline in 1984–85 and recorded a career-best 35 points. He scored 34 points the next year and showed a willingness to play rough in his own zone. Over the next four years Boutilier's play was less consistent. He moved around the league with the Boston Bruins, Minnesota North Stars, New York Rangers, Winnipeg Jets, and three different minor pro clubs. Boutilier retired in 1990 after spending most of the year in Switzerland with SC Bern.

== Coaching ==
Boutilier was named St. Mary's (AUAA) assistant coach prior to the 1991–92 season and remained in that position through 1992–93. He was promoted to head coach prior to 1993–94 season and remained in that position through 1996–97.

== Post-hockey ==
After retiring from hockey, Boutilier became a regular on the Canadian curling circuit, serving as head of the World Curling Tour and World Curling Players' Association.

Boutilier taught International Marketing at the University of Prince Edward Island and was the Director of Defence Development & Analytics for the Saint John Sea Dogs in the QMJHL. In 2015, he was named assistant coach of the Sea Dogs.

Boutilier died in Halifax, Nova Scotia on May 14, 2026, at the age of 63.

== Career statistics ==
=== Regular season and playoffs ===
			Regular season					Playoffs
Season	Team	League	GP	G	A	Pts	PIM	GP	G	A	Pts	PIM
1979–80	Cape Breton Miners	NSAHA	56	30	43	73		—	—	—	—	—
1980–81	Sherbrooke Castors	QMJHL	72	10	29	39	93	14	3	7	10	10
1981–82	Sherbrooke Castors	QMJHL	57	20	60	80	62	21	7	31	38	12
1981–82	New York Islanders	NHL	1	0	0	0	0	—	—	—	—	—
1982–83	Saint-Jean Castors	QMJHL	22	5	14	19	30	—	—	—	—	—
1982–83	New York Islanders	NHL	29	4	5	9	24	2	0	0	0	2
1983–84	New York Islanders	NHL	28	0	11	11	36	21	1	7	8	10
1983–84	Indianapolis Checkers	CHL	50	6	17	23	56	—	—	—	—	—
1984–85	New York Islanders	NHL	78	12	23	35	90	10	0	2	2	16
1985–86	New York Islanders	NHL	77	4	30	34	100	3	0	0	0	2
1986–87	Boston Bruins	NHL	52	5	9	14	84	—	—	—	—	—
1986–87	Minnesota North Stars	NHL	10	2	4	6	8	—	—	—	—	—
1987–88	New York Rangers	NHL	4	0	1	1	6	—	—	—	—	—
1987–88	New Haven Nighthawks	AHL	9	0	3	3	10	—	—	—	—	—
1987–88	Colorado Rangers	IHL	9	2	6	8	4	—	—	—	—	—
1987–88	Winnipeg Jets	NHL	6	0	0	0	6	5	0	0	0	15
1987–88	Moncton Hawks	AHL	41	9	29	38	40	—	—	—	—	—
1988–89	Winnipeg Jets	NHL	3	0	0	0	4	—	—	—	—	—
1988–89	Moncton Hawks	AHL	77	6	54	60	101	10	2	7	9	4
1989–90	SC Bern	NDA	35	13	28	41	36	4	0	1	1	4
1989–90	Canada	Intl	4	0	2	2	0	—	—	—	—	—
1989–90	Maine Mariners	AHL	12	0	4	4	21	—	—	—	—	—
1990–91	Zürcher SC	NDA	22	4	8	12	28	—	—	—	—	—
NHL totals			288	27	83	110	358	41	1	9	10	45
AHL totals			139	15	90	105	172	10	2	7	9	4

=== International ===
Year	Team	Event	GP	G	A	Pts	PIM
1982	Canada	WJC	7	2	4	6	4
1983	Canada	WJC	7	2	3	5	2
Junior totals			14	4	7	11	6

== Awards and honors ==
- QMJHL First All-Star Team (1982)
- QMJHL Emile Bouchard Trophy (Defenseman of Year) 1981-82
- Memorial Cup Tournament All-Star Team (1982)
- 1983 Stanley Cup- New York Islanders
- AHL First All-Star Team (1989)
- Inducted to Nova Scotia Sports Hall of Fame, 1994

Preceded by Brent Sutter	New York Islanders first-round draft pick 1981	Succeeded by Patrick Flatley
