= J. J. Daigneault =

Canadian ice hockey player (born 1965)

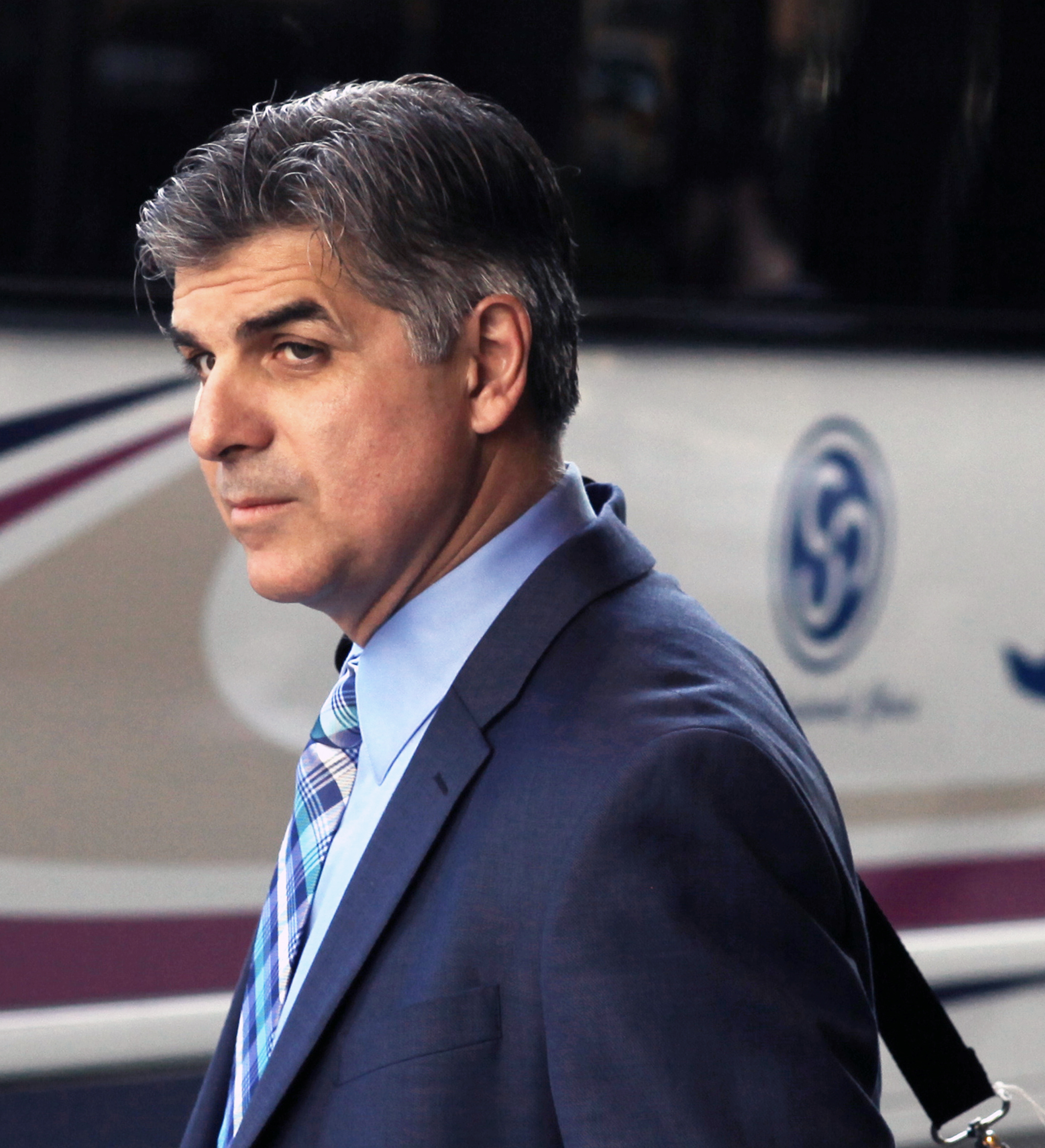
- Born: October 12, 1965 (age 61) Montreal, Quebec, Canada
- Height: 5 ft 11 in (180 cm)
- Weight: 180 lb (82 kg; 12 st 12 lb)
- Position: Defence
- Shot: Left
- Played for: Vancouver Canucks; Philadelphia Flyers; Montreal Canadiens; St. Louis Blues; Pittsburgh Penguins; Mighty Ducks of Anaheim; New York Islanders; Nashville Predators; Phoenix Coyotes; Minnesota Wild
- National team: Canada
- NHL draft: 10th overall, 1984; Vancouver Canucks
- Playing career: 1984–2001

Jean-Jacques Daigneault (born October 12, 1965) is a Canadian former professional ice hockey defenceman who played in the National Hockey League from 1984 to 2000. He was the head coach of the Halifax Mooseheads of the Quebec Major Junior Hockey League from 2019 to 2021. He also served as an assistant coach for the Montreal Canadiens of the NHL from 2012 until the end of the 2017–18 NHL season.

== Playing career ==
As a youth, Daigneault and his teammate Mario Lemieux, played in the 1977 and 1978 Quebec International Pee-Wee Hockey Tournaments with a minor ice hockey team from Ville-Émard.

Daigneault was selected tenth overall in the first round of the 1984 NHL Entry Draft by the Vancouver Canucks. Daigneault is one of the most well-travelled players in NHL history. When he joined his tenth team, the Minnesota Wild, in 2000, he tied the NHL record held by Michel Petit. The record has since been broken by Mike Sillinger. Daigneault remains tied for second in the category, along with Petit, Jim Dowd, Lee Stempniak, Derick Brassard, Mathieu Schneider, Dominic Moore and Olli Jokinen.

Daigneault played for the Vancouver Canucks (1984–85 – 1985–86), Philadelphia Flyers (1986–87 – 1987–88), Montreal Canadiens (1989–90 – 1995–96), St. Louis Blues (1995–96), Pittsburgh Penguins (1995–96 – 1996–97), Mighty Ducks of Anaheim (1996–97 – 1997–98), New York Islanders (1997–98), Nashville Predators (1998–99), Phoenix Coyotes (1998–99 – 1999–2000), and Minnesota Wild (2000–01). He played in the Stanley Cup finals with Philadelphia in 1987, and was a key member of the Montreal Canadiens as they won their 24th Stanley Cup in 1993.

=== 1987 Stanley Cup Finals ===
Daigneault's earliest fame at the NHL level came when he scored the winning goal for the Philadelphia Flyers in the sixth game of the 1987 Stanley Cup Finals against the Edmonton Oilers. Daigneault had scored only six goals during the regular season, and, up to that point, had zero points in 8 playoff games. In 2006, this game was voted the eighth-greatest game in Philadelphia Flyers history according to fan voting.

== Career statistics ==
=== Regular season and playoffs ===
			Regular season					Playoffs
Season	Team	League	GP	G	A	Pts	PIM	GP	G	A	Pts	PIM
1980–81	Montreal-Concordia	QMAAA	48	7	48	55	95	—	—	—	—	—
1981–82	Laval Voisins	QMJHL	64	4	25	29	41	18	1	3	4	2
1982–83	Longueuil Chevaliers	QMJHL	70	26	58	84	58	15	4	11	15	35
1983–84	Canada	Intl	62	6	15	21	40	—	—	—	—	—
1983–84	Longueuil Chevaliers	QMJHL	10	2	11	13	6	14	3	13	16	30
1984–85	Vancouver Canucks	NHL	67	4	23	27	69	—	—	—	—	—
1985–86	Vancouver Canucks	NHL	64	5	23	28	45	3	0	2	2	0
1986–87	Philadelphia Flyers	NHL	77	6	16	22	56	9	1	0	1	0
1987–88	Hershey Bears	AHL	10	1	5	6	8	—	—	—	—	—
1987–88	Philadelphia Flyers	NHL	28	2	2	4	12	—	—	—	—	—
1988–89	Hershey Bears	AHL	12	0	10	10	13	—	—	—	—	—
1988–89	Sherbrooke Canadiens	AHL	63	10	33	43	48	6	1	3	4	2
1989–90	Sherbrooke Canadiens	AHL	28	8	19	27	18	—	—	—	—	—
1989–90	Montreal Canadiens	NHL	36	2	10	12	14	9	0	0	0	2
1990–91	Montreal Canadiens	NHL	51	3	16	19	31	5	0	1	1	0
1991–92	Montreal Canadiens	NHL	79	4	14	18	36	11	0	3	3	4
1992–93	Montreal Canadiens	NHL	66	8	10	18	57	20	1	3	4	22
1993–94	Montreal Canadiens	NHL	68	2	12	14	73	7	0	1	1	12
1994–95	Montreal Canadiens	NHL	45	3	5	8	40	—	—	—	—	—
1995–96	Montreal Canadiens	NHL	7	0	1	1	6	—	—	—	—	—
1995–96	St. Louis Blues	NHL	37	1	3	4	24	—	—	—	—	—
1995–96	Worcester IceCats	AHL	9	1	10	11	10	—	—	—	—	—
1995–96	Pittsburgh Penguins	NHL	13	3	3	6	23	17	1	9	10	36
1996–97	Pittsburgh Penguins	NHL	53	3	14	17	36	—	—	—	—	—
1996–97	Mighty Ducks of Anaheim	NHL	13	2	9	11	22	11	2	7	9	16
1997–98	Mighty Ducks of Anaheim	NHL	53	2	15	17	28	—	—	—	—	—
1997–98	New York Islanders	NHL	18	0	6	6	21	—	—	—	—	—
1998–99	Nashville Predators	NHL	35	2	2	4	38	—	—	—	—	—
1998–99	Phoenix Coyotes	NHL	35	0	7	7	32	6	0	0	0	8
1999–2000	Phoenix Coyotes	NHL	53	1	6	7	22	1	0	0	0	0
2000–01	Cleveland Lumberjacks	IHL	44	8	9	17	18	—	—	—	—	—
2000–01	Minnesota Wild	NHL	1	0	0	0	2	—	—	—	—	—
2001–02	EHC Biel-Bienne	CHE II	7	5	2	7	14	2	0	0	0	0
NHL totals			899	53	197	250	687	99	5	26	31	100

=== International ===
Year	Team	Event	GP	G	A	Pts	PIM
1984	Canada	WJC	7	0	2	2	2
1984	Canada	OG	7	1	1	2	0

== Coaching career ==
Seasons	Team	League	Role
2005–2006	Phoenix RoadRunners	ECHL	Assistant coach
2007–2012	Hartford Wolf Pack	American Hockey League	Assistant coach
2012–2018	Montreal Canadiens	National Hockey League	Assistant coach
2018–2019	San Antonio Rampage	American Hockey League	Assistant coach
2019–2021	Halifax Mooseheads	Quebec Major Junior Hockey League	Head coach

== Personal life ==
Daigneault and his wife Janie have three daughters, Valérie, Gabrielle and Juliette. All three of the girls were born in different states where Daigneault was playing at the time. The family resides in Dorval, Quebec.

Preceded by Cam Neely	Vancouver Canucks first-round draft pick 1984	Succeeded by Jim Sandlak
