= Michael Bossy Trophy =

The Michael Bossy Trophy (French:Trophée Michael Bossy) is awarded annually to the player in the Quebec Maritimes Junior Hockey League (QMJHL) judged to be the best professional prospect. The award is named after former New York Islanders forward Mike Bossy, who played in the QMJHL prior to his Hockey Hall of Fame career.

== Winners ==
List of trophy winners:

Season	Player	QMJHL team	NHL entry draft	NHL draft team
1980–81	Dale Hawerchuk	Cornwall Royals	1st 1981	Winnipeg Jets
1981–82	Michel Petit	Sherbrooke Castors	11th 1982	Vancouver Canucks
1982–83	Pat LaFontaine	Verdun Juniors	3rd 1983	New York Islanders
1982–83	Sylvain Turgeon	Hull Olympiques	2nd 1983	Hartford Whalers
1983–84	Mario Lemieux	Laval Voisins	1st 1984	Pittsburgh Penguins
1984–85	José Charbonneau	Drummondville Voltigeurs	12th 1985	Montreal Canadiens
1985–86	Jimmy Carson	Verdun Junior Canadiens	2nd 1986	Los Angeles Kings
1986–87	Pierre Turgeon	Granby Bisons	1st 1987	Buffalo Sabres
1987–88	Daniel Doré	Drummondville Voltigeurs	5th 1988	Quebec Nordiques
1988–89	Patrice Brisebois	Laval Titan	30th 1989	Montreal Canadiens
1989–90	Karl Dykhuis	Hull Olympiques	16th 1990	Chicago Blackhawks
1990–91	Philippe Boucher	Granby Bisons	13th 1991	Buffalo Sabres
1991–92	Paul Brousseau	Hull Olympiques	28th 1992	Quebec Nordiques
1992–93	Alexandre Daigle	Victoriaville Tigres	1st 1993	Ottawa Senators
1993–94	Éric Fichaud	Chicoutimi Saguenéens	16th 1994	Toronto Maple Leafs
1994–95	Martin Biron	Beauport Harfangs	16th 1995	Buffalo Sabres
1995–96	Jean-Pierre Dumont	Val-d'Or Foreurs	3rd 1996	New York Islanders
1996–97	Roberto Luongo	Val-d'Or Foreurs	4th 1997	New York Islanders
1997–98	Vincent Lecavalier	Rimouski Océanic	1st 1998	Tampa Bay Lightning
1998–99	Maxime Ouellet	Quebec Remparts	22nd 1999	Philadelphia Flyers
1999–2000	Antoine Vermette	Victoriaville Tigres	55th 2000	Ottawa Senators
2000–01	Ales Hemsky	Hull Olympiques	13th 2001	Edmonton Oilers
2001–02	Pierre-Marc Bouchard	Chicoutimi Saguenéens	8th 2002	Minnesota Wild
2002–03	Marc-André Fleury	Cape Breton Screaming Eagles	1st 2003	Pittsburgh Penguins
2003–04	Alexandre Picard	Lewiston MAINEiacs	8th 2004	Columbus Blue Jackets
2004–05	Sidney Crosby	Rimouski Océanic	1st 2005	Pittsburgh Penguins
2005–06	Derick Brassard	Drummondville Voltigeurs	6th 2006	Columbus Blue Jackets
2006–07	Angelo Esposito	Quebec Remparts	20th 2007	Pittsburgh Penguins
2007–08	Mikhail Stefanovich	Quebec Remparts	98th 2008	Toronto Maple Leafs
2008–09	Dmitry Kulikov	Drummondville Voltigeurs	14th 2009	Florida Panthers
2009–10	Brandon Gormley	Moncton Wildcats	13th 2010	Phoenix Coyotes
2010–11	Sean Couturier	Drummondville Voltigeurs	8th 2011	Philadelphia Flyers
2011–12	Mikhail Grigorenko	Quebec Remparts	12th 2012	Buffalo Sabres
2012–13	Jonathan Drouin	Halifax Mooseheads	3rd 2013	Tampa Bay Lightning
2013–14	Nikolaj Ehlers	Halifax Mooseheads	9th 2014	Winnipeg Jets
2014–15	Timo Meier	Halifax Mooseheads	9th 2015	San Jose Sharks
2015–16	Pierre-Luc Dubois	Cape Breton Screaming Eagles	3rd 2016	Columbus Blue Jackets
2016–17	Nico Hischier	Halifax Mooseheads	1st 2017	New Jersey Devils
2017–18	Filip Zadina	Halifax Mooseheads	6th 2018	Detroit Red Wings
2018–19	Raphaël Lavoie	Halifax Mooseheads	38th 2019	Edmonton Oilers
2019–20	Alexis Lafrenière	Rimouski Océanic	1st 2020	New York Rangers
2020–21	Zachary Bolduc	Rimouski Océanic	17th 2021	St. Louis Blues
2021–22	Nathan Gaucher	Quebec Remparts	22nd 2022	Anaheim Ducks
2022–23	Ethan Gauthier	Sherbrooke Phoenix	37th 2023	Tampa Bay Lightning
2023–24	Maxim Massé	Chicoutimi Saguenéens	66th 2024	Anaheim Ducks
2024–25	Caleb Desnoyers	Moncton Wildcats	4th 2025	Utah Mammoth
