= Roberto Romano =

- Born: October 26, 1962 (age 63) Montreal, Quebec, Canada
- Height: 5 ft 6 in (168 cm)
- Weight: 170 lb (77 kg; 12 st 2 lb)
- Position: Goaltender
- Caught: Left
- Played for: Pittsburgh Penguins; Boston Bruins; HC Devils Milano; HC Bolzano; HC Meran
- National team: Italy
- NHL draft: Undrafted
- Playing career: 1982–1994

Roberto Romano (born October 26, 1962) is a Canadian-born Italian former ice hockey goaltender. He played 126 games in the National Hockey League with the Pittsburgh Penguins and Boston Bruins between 1982 and 1994. He also played several years in the Italian Serie A. Internationally Romano played for the Italian national team at the 1992 World Championships.

== Playing career ==
Romano played major junior with the Quebec Remparts and Hull Olympiques. He started his National Hockey League career with the Pittsburgh Penguins in 1982. During his career, he was traded in 1987 to the Boston Bruins, before moving to Europe. Seven years after making his previous NHL appearance, Romano played two games for the Pittsburgh Penguins in 1994. He retired after the 1994 season.

== International ==
Romano has Italian citizenship and played for the Italian national ice hockey team at the 1992 World Ice Hockey Championships. He played in 3 games.

== Career statistics ==
=== Regular season and playoffs ===
			Regular season									Playoffs
Season	Team	League	GP	W	L	T	MIN	GA	SO	GAA	SV%	GP	W	L	MIN	GA	SO	GAA	SV%
1979–80	Quebec Remparts	QMJHL	52	21	17	3	2411	183	0	4.55	.868	3	1	1	150	12	0	4.80	.842
1980–81	Quebec Remparts	QMJHL	59	24	26	2	3174	233	0	4.40	.882	4	1	2	164	18	0	6.59	.874
1981–82	Quebec Remparts	QMJHL	1	0	1	0	60	4	0	4.00	.889	—	—	—	—	—	—	—	—
1981–82	Hull Olympiques	QMJHL	56	34	17	2	3090	194	1	3.77	.899	13	6	7	760	50	0	3.95	.890
1982–83	Pittsburgh Penguins	NHL	3	0	2	0	155	18	0	6.97	.813	—	—	—	—	—	—	—	—
1982–83	Baltimore Skipjacks	AHL	38	19	14	3	2163	146	0	4.05	.888	—	—	—	—	—	—	—	—
1983–84	Pittsburgh Penguins	NHL	18	6	11	0	1018	78	1	4.60	.876	—	—	—	—	—	—	—	—
1983–84	Baltimore Skipjacks	AHL	31	23	6	1	1759	106	0	3.62	.889	9	5	3	544	36	0	3.97	—
1984–85	Pittsburgh Penguins	NHL	31	9	17	2	1619	120	1	4.45	.879	—	—	—	—	—	—	—	—
1984–85	Baltimore Skipjacks	AHL	12	2	8	2	719	44	0	3.67	.878	—	—	—	—	—	—	—	—
1985–86	Pittsburgh Penguins	NHL	46	21	20	3	2676	159	2	3.56	.885	—	—	—	—	—	—	—	—
1986–87	Pittsburgh Penguins	NHL	25	9	11	2	1433	87	0	3.64	.878	—	—	—	—	—	—	—	—
1986–87	Boston Bruins	NHL	1	0	1	0	60	6	0	6.00	.824	—	—	—	—	—	—	—	—
1986–87	Baltimore Skipjacks	AHL	5	0	3	0	274	18	0	3.94	.871	—	—	—	—	—	—	—	—
1986–87	Moncton Golden Flames	AHL	1	1	0	0	65	3	0	2.77	.897	—	—	—	—	—	—	—	—
1987–88	Maine Mariners	AHL	16	5	8	1	875	52	0	3.57	.872	—	—	—	—	—	—	—	—
1987–88	HC Meran	ITA	8	—	—	—	—	—	—	—	—	—	—	—	—	—	—	—	—
1989–90	HC Bolzano	ITA	32	—	—	—	1778	105	0	3.54	—	—	—	—	—	—	—	—	—
1990–91	HC Devils Milano	ITA	10	—	—	—	538	31	0	3.45	—	—	—	—	—	—	—	—	—
1991–92	HC Devils Milano	ITA	17	—	—	—	973	42	1	2.58	—	2	—	—	120	2	1	1.00	—
1991–92	HC Devils Milano	ALP	29	—	—	—	1704	78	2	2.74	—	—	—	—	—	—	—	—	—
1992–93	HC Devils Milano	ALP	28	—	—	—	1549	73	0	2.82	—	—	—	—	—	—	—	—	—
1993–94	Pittsburgh Penguins	NHL	2	1	0	1	125	3	0	1.44	.946	—	—	—	—	—	—	—	—
1993–94	Cleveland Lumberjacks	IHL	11	2	7	2	642	45	1	4.20	.882	—	—	—	—	—	—	—	—
NHL totals			126	46	63	8	7087	471	4	3.99	.879	—	—	—	—	—	—	—	—

=== International ===
Year	Team	Event	GP	W	L	T	MIN	GA	SO	GAA	SV%
1992	Italy	WC	3	—	—	—	151	11	0	4.37	.880
Senior totals			3	—	—	—	151	11	0	4.37	.880
