= Claude Verret =

Canadian ice hockey player (1963–2025)

- Born: April 20, 1963 Lachine, Quebec, Canada
- Died: March 13, 2025 (aged 61)
- Height: 5 ft 9 in (175 cm)
- Weight: 165 lb (75 kg; 11 st 11 lb)
- Position: Centre
- Shot: Left
- Played for: Buffalo Sabres
- NHL draft: 163rd overall, 1982; Buffalo Sabres
- Playing career: 1983–1999

Claude Verret (French: [klod vɛʁɛ]; April 20, 1963 – March 13, 2025) was a Canadian professional ice hockey centre. He was drafted in the eighth round, 163rd overall, by the Buffalo Sabres in the 1982 NHL entry draft.

== Biography ==
Verret was born in Lachine, Quebec (in present-day Montreal) but grew up in Quebec City, Quebec. As a youth, he played in the 1975 and 1976 Quebec International Pee-Wee Hockey Tournaments with a minor ice hockey team from Beauport, Quebec.

In the Quebec Major Junior Hockey League, he tallied 462 points in 200 games over three seasons with the Trois-Rivières Draveurs, winning the Jean Béliveau Trophy in 1981–82 as the league's leading scorer. He scored another 183 points in 141 games during his first two seasons in the American Hockey League with the Sabres' farm club, the Rochester Americans, and won the Dudley "Red" Garrett Memorial Award in 1983–84 as the league's top rookie.

Despite this success at the junior and minor league levels, Verret did not make much impact in the National Hockey League. He played in just fourteen games with the Sabres, eleven in 1983–84 and three in 1984–85. He scored two goals and added five assists.

Verret began playing in Europe in 1987, spending many seasons playing in France and Switzerland before retiring in 1999. He died on March 13, 2025, at the age of 61.

== Awards ==
- Michel Bergeron Trophy (QMJHL offensive rookie of the year): 1980–81
- Frank J. Selke Memorial Trophy (QMJHL most sportsmanlike player): 1980–81 and 1981–82
- Jean Beliveau Trophy (QMJHL leading scorer): 1981–82
- Dudley "Red" Garrett Memorial Award (AHL rookie of the year): 1983–84

== Career statistics ==
			Regular season					Playoffs
Season	Team	League	GP	G	A	Pts	PIM	GP	G	A	Pts	PIM
1978–79	Sainte–Foy Couillard	QMAAA	38	13	11	24	4	6	3	2	5	0
1979–80	Sainte–Foy Gouverneurs	QMAAA	38	29	47	76	8	12	4	8	12	0
1980–81	Trois–Rivières Draveurs	QMJHL	68	39	73	112	4	19	13	24	37	7
1981–82	Trois–Rivières Draveurs	QMJHL	64	54	108	162	14	23	13	35	48	4
1982–83	Trois–Rivières Draveurs	QMJHL	68	73	115	188	20	4	3	6	9	4
1983–84	Buffalo Sabres	NHL	11	2	5	7	2	—	—	—	—	—
1983–84	Rochester Americans	AHL	65	39	51	90	4	18	5	9	14	4
1984–85	Buffalo Sabres	NHL	3	0	0	0	0	—	—	—	—	—
1984–85	Rochester Americans	AHL	76	40	53	93	12	5	2	5	7	0
1985–86	Rochester Americans	AHL	52	19	32	51	14	—	—	—	—	—
1986–87	EHC Kloten	NDA	1	2	1	3	0	4	1	0	1	2
1986–87	Rochester Americans	AHL	36	13	12	25	2	8	3	3	6	0
1987–88	HC Rouen	FRA	28	29	36	65	20	—	—	—	—	—
1988–89	HC Rouen	FRA	38	48	58	106	6	5	7	9	16	4
1989–90	HC Rouen	FRA	31	31	35	66	4	4	2	2	4	0
1990–91	HC Rouen	FRA	28	19	37	56	4	9	7	14	21	0
1991–92	Français Volants	FRA.2	14	16	9	25	36	—	—	—	—	—
1992–93	HC Rouen	FRA	31	40	43	83	6	—	—	—	—	—
1993–94	HC Rouen	FRA	8	4	17	21	12	4	2	6	8	0
1993–94	Lausanne HC	CHE.2	19	18	19	37	6	13	11	10	21	4
1994–95	Lausanne HC	CHE.2	36	44	45	89	6	11	10	20	30	6
1995–96	Lausanne HC	NDA	19	10	8	18	2	—	—	—	—	—
1996–97	Genève–Servette HC	CHE.2	42	31	45	76	6	—	—	—	—	—
1997–98	Genève–Servette HC	CHE.2	40	23	46	69	16	—	—	—	—	—
1998–99	Lausanne HC	CHE.2	23	13	24	37	12	1	0	2	2	0
1999–2000	Lausanne HC	CHE.2	32	17	29	46	8	3	0	2	2	0
NHL totals			14	2	5	7	2	–	–	–	–	–
AHL totals			229	111	148	259	32	31	10	17	27	4
FRA totals			164	171	226	397	52	22	18	31	49	4
CHE.2 totals			192	146	208	354	54	28	21	34	55	10

Preceded by Inaugural winner	Winner of the Michel Bergeron Trophy; 1980–81	Succeeded by Sylvain Turgeon
Preceded by Jean-François Sauvé	Winner of the Frank J. Selke Memorial Trophy; 1980–81 and 1981–82	Succeeded by Pat LaFontaine
Preceded by Dale Hawerchuk	Winner of the Jean Beliveau Trophy; 1981–82	Succeeded by Pat LaFontaine
Preceded by Mitch Lamoureux	Winner of the Dudley "Red" Garrett Memorial Award; 1983–84	Succeeded by Steve Thomas
