= Luc Dufour =

Canadian ice hockey player (born 1963)

- Born: February 13, 1963 (age 62); Chicoutimi, Quebec, Canada
- Height: 5 ft 11 in (180 cm)
- Weight: 181 lb (82 kg; 12 st 13 lb)
- Position: Centre
- Shot: Left
- Played for: Boston Bruins; Quebec Nordiques; St. Louis Blues
- NHL draft: 35th overall, 1981; Boston Bruins
- Playing career: 1981–1987

Luc Dufour (born February 13, 1963) is a Canadian former professional ice hockey player who played 167 games in the National Hockey League. He played for the Boston Bruins, Quebec Nordiques, and St. Louis Blues. Dufour accumulated a total of 44 points and 199 penalty minutes in his 167 games played in the NHL. As a youth, he played in the 1975 and 1976 Quebec International Pee-Wee Hockey Tournaments with a minor ice hockey team from Chicoutimi.

== Career statistics ==
=== Regular season and playoffs ===
			Regular season					Playoffs
Season	Team	League	GP	G	A	Pts	PIM	GP	G	A	Pts	PIM
1978–79	Boisbriand-Laurentides	QMAAA	38	30	28	58	71	8	6	9	15	12
1979–80	Boisbriand-Laurentides	QMAAA	42	33	33	66	70	2	2	3	5	2
1980–81	Chicoutimi Sagueneens	QMJHL	69	43	53	96	89	4	1	2	3	8
1981–82	Chicoutimi Sagueneens	QMJHL	62	55	60	115	94	20	12	19	31	26
1982–83	Boston Bruins	NHL	73	14	11	25	107	17	1	0	1	30
1983–84	Boston Bruins	NHL	41	6	4	10	47	—	—	—	—	—
1983–84	Hershey Bears	AHL	37	9	19	28	51	—	—	—	—	—
1984–85	Hershey Bears	AHL	6	1	1	2	10	—	—	—	—	—
1984–85	Quebec Nordiques	NHL	30	2	3	5	27	—	—	—	—	—
1984–85	Fredericton Express	AHL	12	2	0	2	13	—	—	—	—	—
1984–85	St. Louis Blues	NHL	23	1	3	4	18	1	0	0	0	2
1985–86	Maine Mariners	AHL	75	15	20	35	57	5	0	0	0	8
1986–87	HC Auronzo	ITA	34	35	40	75	52	—	—	—	—	—
NHL totals			167	23	21	44	199	18	1	0	1	32
