= Pierre Rioux =

Canadian ice hockey player

- Born: February 1, 1962 (age 64) Quebec City, Quebec, Canada
- Height: 5 ft 10 in (178 cm)
- Weight: 167 lb (76 kg; 11 st 13 lb)
- Position: Right wing
- Shot: Left
- Played for: Calgary Flames; KalPa; Düsseldorfer EG; Augsburger Panther; Kassel Huskies
- NHL draft: Undrafted
- Playing career: 1982–2001

Pierre Rioux (born February 1, 1962) is a Canadian former professional ice hockey player. He played 14 games in the National Hockey League (NHL) for the Calgary Flames during the 1982–83 season, recording one goal and two assists. The rest of his career, which lasted from 1982 to 2001, was mainly spent in Germany.

== Playing career ==
Rioux was born in Quebec City, Quebec. As a youth, Rioux played in the 1974 and 1975 Quebec International Pee-Wee Hockey Tournaments with a minor ice hockey team from Quebec City.

Rioux spent three seasons with the Shawinigan Cataractes of the Quebec Major Junior Hockey League, recording 130 points in 1980–81 and 152 points in 1981–82. In 1982, Rioux was a member of the gold medal-winning Canadian team at the World Junior Hockey Championships. He was also named a QMJHL First Team All-Star.

As a player with the Flames in 1982, he appeared in 14 games. After three seasons in the minors, Rioux moved to Europe to play in 1986 and spent all but one season in Germany until he returned to Quebec in 2000. Rioux played one season of senior hockey in Quebec in 2000–01 before retiring.

== Career statistics ==
=== Regular season and playoffs ===
			Regular season					Playoffs
Season	Team	League	GP	G	A	Pts	PIM	GP	G	A	Pts	PIM
1977–78	Sainte-Foy Couillard	QMAAA	39	22	27	49	31	1	0	0	0	0
1978–79	Sainte-Foy Couillard	QMAAA	39	38	59	97	28	8	4	7	11	6
1979–80	Shawinigan Cataractes	QMJHL	70	27	47	74	24	7	2	2	4	4
1980–81	Shawinigan Cataractes	QMJHL	65	43	57	100	49	5	2	3	5	6
1981–82	Shawinigan Cataractes	QMJHL	57	66	86	152	50	14	15	26	41	8
1982–83	Calgary Flames	NHL	14	1	2	3	4	—	—	—	—	—
1982–83	Colorado Flames	CHL	59	26	36	62	18	—	—	—	—	—
1983–84	Colorado Flames	CHL	65	37	46	83	22	6	2	7	9	4
1984–85	Moncton Golden Flames	AHL	69	25	66	91	14	—	—	—	—	—
1985–86	Moncton Golden Flames	AHL	5	0	0	0	0	—	—	—	—	—
1985–86	Binghamton Whalers	AHL	6	0	2	2	0	—	—	—	—	—
1985–86	EV Zug	NLB	10	8	12	20	9	—	—	—	—	—
1986–87	Krefelder EV 1981	GER-2	41	72	73	145	44	—	—	—	—	—
1987–88	KalPa	SM-l	41	21	20	41	44	—	—	—	—	—
1988–89	EC Ratingen	GER-2	45	36	64	100	36	—	—	—	—	—
1989–90	SV Bayreuth	GER-2	36	47	51	98	8	18	24	27	51	8
1990–91	SV Bayreuth	GER-2	32	39	44	83	72	18	18	27	45	6
1991–92	SV Bayreuth	GER-2	43	29	58	87	24	—	—	—	—	—
1992–93	SV Bayreuth	GER-2	45	41	52	93	14	—	—	—	—	—
1993–94	Düsseldorfer EG	GER	42	12	24	36	8	12	3	3	6	2
1994–95	Düsseldorfer EG	DEL	42	16	35	51	8	10	1	10	11	6
1995–96	Heilbronner EC	GER-2	46	42	69	111	32	9	5	9	14	4
1995–96	Augsburger Panther	DEL	1	1	1	2	0	—	—	—	—	—
1996–97	Heilbronner EC	GER-2	21	13	25	38	4	—	—	—	—	—
1996–97	Augsburger Panther	DEL	27	14	16	30	2	—	—	—	—	—
1997–98	Augsburger Panther	DEL	44	20	25	45	4	6	2	3	5	0
1998–99	Augsburger Panther	DEL	49	18	23	41	6	5	4	2	6	0
1999–00	Kassel Huskies	DEL	24	3	10	13	4	8	0	3	3	4
2000–01	Garaga de Saint-Georges	QSPHL	12	5	7	12	2	—	—	—	—	—
DEL totals			187	72	110	182	24	33	10	19	29	10
NHL totals			14	1	2	3	4	—	—	—	—	—

=== International ===
Year	Team	Event	GP	G	A	Pts	PIM
1982	Canada	WJC	7	3	3	6	4
Junior totals			7	3	3	6	4
