= Michel Bergeron Trophy =

The Michel Bergeron Trophy is awarded annually to the Quebec Maritimes Junior Hockey League (QMJHL)'s "Offensive Rookie of the Year". From 1969 to 1980, the trophy was awarded to the QMHL's "Overall Rookie of the Year." The Bergeron trophy's counterpart since 1980, the Raymond Lagacé Trophy, is awarded to the "Defensive Rookie of the Year." The QMJHL created the RDS Cup in 1991, as a reunified Rookie of the Year award.

== Overall winners ==
Season	Player	Team
1969–70	Serge Martel	Verdun Maple Leafs
1970–71	Bob Murphy	Cornwall Royals
1971–72	Bob Murray	Cornwall Royals
1972–73	Pierre Larouche	Sorel Éperviers
1973–74	Mike Bossy	Laval National
1974–75	Denis Pomerleau	Hull Festivals
1975–76	Jean-Marc Bonamie	Shawinigan Dynamos
1976–77	Rick Vaive	Sherbrooke Castors
1977–78	Denis Savard	Montreal Juniors
1977–78	Normand Rochefort	Trois-Rivières Draveurs
1978–79	Alain Grenier	Laval National
1979–80	Dale Hawerchuk	Cornwall Royals

== Offensive winners ==
Season	Player	Team
1980–81	Claude Verret	Trois-Rivières Draveurs
1981–82	Sylvain Turgeon	Hull Olympiques
1982–83	Pat LaFontaine	Verdun Juniors
1983–84	Stéphane Richer	Granby Bisons
1984–85	Jimmy Carson	Verdun Junior Canadiens
1985–86	Pierre Turgeon	Granby Bisons
1986–87	Rob Murphy	Laval Voisins
1987–88	Martin Gélinas	Hull Olympiques
1988–89	Yanic Perreault	Trois-Rivières Draveurs
1989–90	Martin Lapointe	Laval Titan
1990–91	René Corbet	Drummondville Voltigeurs
1991–92	Alexandre Daigle	Victoriaville Tigres
1992–93	Steve Brûlé	Saint-Jean Lynx
1993–94	Christian Dubé	Sherbrooke Faucons
1994–95	Daniel Brière	Drummondville Voltigeurs
1995–96	Pavel Rosa	Hull Olympiques
1996–97	Vincent Lecavalier	Rimouski Océanic
1997–98	Mike Ribeiro	Rouyn-Noranda Huskies
1998–99	Ladislav Nagy	Halifax Mooseheads
1999–2000	Chris Montgomery	Montreal Rocket
2000–01	Pierre-Marc Bouchard	Chicoutimi Saguenéens
2001–02	Benoît Mondou	Baie-Comeau Drakkar
2002–03	Petr Vrana	Halifax Mooseheads
2003–04	Sidney Crosby	Rimouski Océanic
2004–05	Derick Brassard	Drummondville Voltigeurs
2005–06	Angelo Esposito	Quebec Remparts
2006–07	Jakub Voracek	Halifax Mooseheads
2007–08	Nicolas Deschamps	Chicoutimi Saguenéens
2008–09	Dmitri Kugryshev	Quebec Remparts
2009–10	Petr Straka	Rimouski Océanic
2010–11	Charles Hudon	Chicoutimi Saguenéens
2011–12	Mikhail Grigorenko	Quebec Remparts
2012–13	Valentin Zykov	Baie-Comeau Drakkar
2013–14	Nikolaj Ehlers	Halifax Mooseheads
2014–15	Dmytro Timashov	Quebec Remparts
2015–16	Vitalii Abramov	Gatineau Olympiques
2016–17	Nico Hischier	Halifax Mooseheads
2017–18	Alexis Lafrenière	Rimouski Océanic
2018–19	Hendrix Lapierre	Chicoutimi Saguenéens
2019–20	Zachary Bolduc	Rimouski Océanic
2020–21	Antonin Verreault	Gatineau Olympiques
2021–22	Jakub Brabenec	Charlottetown Islanders
2022–23	Maxim Massé	Chicoutimi Saguenéens
2023–24	Émile Guité	Chicoutimi Saguenéens
2024–25	Matvei Gridin	Shawinigan Cataractes
2025–26	Egor Shilov	Victoriaville Tigres
