= Sean McKenna (ice hockey) =

Canadian ice hockey player (born 1962)

- Born: March 7, 1962 (age 64) Asbestos, Quebec, Canada
- Height: 6 ft 0 in (183 cm)
- Weight: 190 lb (86 kg; 13 st 8 lb)
- Position: Right wing
- Shot: Right
- Played for: Buffalo Sabres; Los Angeles Kings; Toronto Maple Leafs
- NHL draft: 56th overall, 1980; Buffalo Sabres
- Playing career: 1982–1990

Sean Michael McKenna (born March 7, 1962) is a Canadian former professional ice hockey forward.

== Early life ==
McKenna was born in Asbestos, Quebec. As a youth, he played in the 1974 and 1975 Quebec International Pee-Wee Hockey Tournaments with a minor ice hockey team from Asbestos.

== Career ==
McKenna was drafted in the third round, 56th overall, by the Buffalo Sabres in the 1980 NHL entry draft. He played in the National Hockey League with the Sabres, Los Angeles Kings, and Toronto Maple Leafs between 1982 and 1989.

In his NHL career, McKenna appeared in 414 games. He scored 82 goals and added 80 assists.

== Career statistics ==
=== Regular season and playoffs ===
			Regular season					Playoffs
Season	Team	League	GP	G	A	Pts	PIM	GP	G	A	Pts	PIM
1978–79	Montréal Juniors	QMJHL	66	9	14	23	14	11	2	1	3	9
1979–80	Montréal Juniors	QMJHL	16	1	3	4	5	—	—	—	—	—
1979–80	Sherbrooke Castors	QMJHL	43	19	16	35	19	15	7	7	14	9
1980–81	Sherbrooke Castors	QMJHL	71	57	47	104	112	14	9	9	18	12
1981–82	Buffalo Sabres	NHL	3	0	1	1	2	—	—	—	—	—
1981–82	Sherbrooke Castors	QMJHL	59	57	35	92	29	22	26	18	44	28
1982–83	Buffalo Sabres	NHL	46	10	14	24	4	—	—	—	—	—
1982–83	Rochester Americans	AHL	26	16	10	26	14	16	14	8	22	18
1983–84	Buffalo Sabres	NHL	78	20	10	30	45	3	1	0	1	2
1984–85	Buffalo Sabres	NHL	65	20	16	36	41	5	0	1	1	0
1985–86	Buffalo Sabres	NHL	45	6	12	18	28	—	—	—	—	—
1985–86	Los Angeles Kings	NHL	30	4	0	4	7	5	0	1	1	0
1986–87	Los Angeles Kings	NHL	69	14	19	33	10	5	0	1	1	0
1987–88	Los Angeles Kings	NHL	30	3	2	5	12	—	—	—	—	—
1987–88	Toronto Maple Leafs	NHL	40	5	5	10	12	2	0	0	0	0
1988–89	Toronto Maple Leafs	NHL	3	0	1	1	0	—	—	—	—	—
1988–89	Newmarket Saints	AHL	61	14	27	41	35	5	1	1	2	4
1989–90	Toronto Maple Leafs	NHL	5	0	0	0	20	—	—	—	—	—
1989–90	Newmarket Saints	AHL	73	17	17	34	30	—	—	—	—	—
1996–97	Windsor Papetiers	QSPHL	4	0	1	1	17	—	—	—	—	—
NHL totals			414	82	80	162	181	15	1	2	3	2
