= Michel Petit =

Canadian ice hockey player (born 1964)

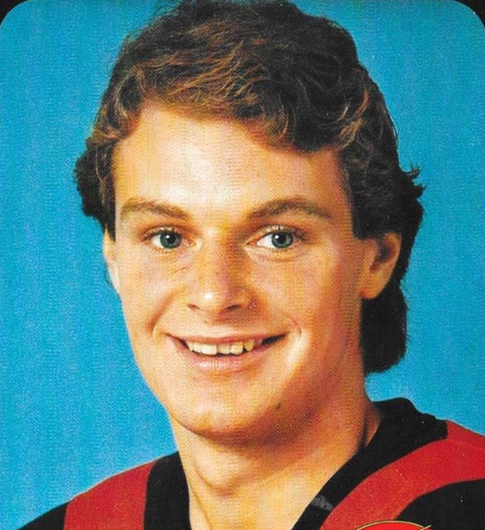
- Petit in 1984 card
- Born: February 12, 1964 (age 62) St. Malo, Quebec, Canada
- Height: 6 ft 3 in (191 cm)
- Weight: 210 lb (95 kg; 15 st 0 lb)
- Position: Defence
- Shot: Right
- Played for: Vancouver Canucks; New York Rangers; Quebec Nordiques; Toronto Maple Leafs; Calgary Flames; Los Angeles Kings; Tampa Bay Lightning; Edmonton Oilers; Philadelphia Flyers; Phoenix Coyotes
- National team: Canada
- NHL draft: 11th overall, 1982; Vancouver Canucks
- Playing career: 1983–2001

Michel Petit (born February 12, 1964) is a Canadian former professional ice hockey player who played in the National Hockey League (NHL) from the 1982–83 NHL season to the 1998–99 NHL season. Upon his retirement Petit had played for a then-NHL record ten different teams, a mark has since been surpassed by Mike Sillinger.

== Playing career ==
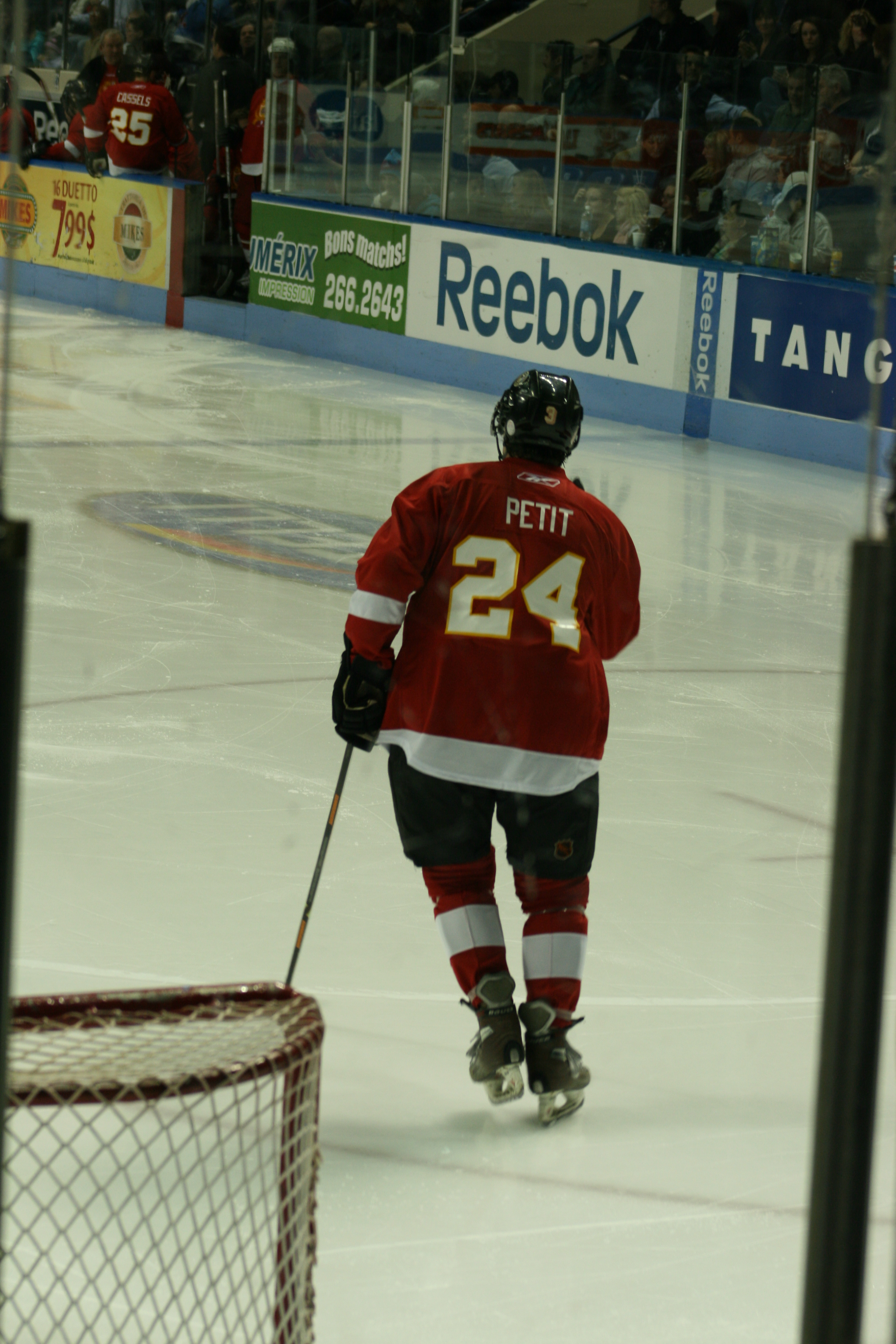
Petit playing at the Legends Games for the 50th edition of the Quebec International Pee-Wee Tournament.

As a youth, Petit played in the Quebec International Pee-Wee Hockey Tournament four consecutive years from 1974 to 1977, with a minor ice hockey team from Pont-Rouge.

Petit was drafted by the Vancouver Canucks in the 1982 NHL entry draft in the first round, eleventh overall. During his 17 seasons in the NHL he played for ten different NHL teams, which as of 2017 was tied along with J. J. Daigneault, Mathieu Schneider, Jim Dowd, Olli Jokinen and Lee Stempniak as the second-most by any player. Petit was the first to hit the ten-team mark.

Petit played for the Vancouver Canucks (1982–83 – 1987–88), New York Rangers (1987–88 – 1988–89), Quebec Nordiques (1989–90 – 1990–91), Toronto Maple Leafs (1990–91 – 1991–92), Calgary Flames (1992–93 – 1993–94), Los Angeles Kings (1994–95 – 1995–96), Tampa Bay Lightning (1995–96), Edmonton Oilers (1996–97), Philadelphia Flyers (1996–97), and Phoenix Coyotes (1997–98) (1998–99).

In his 17 seasons of playing hockey, he amassed a total of 90 goals, 238 assists, 328 points, 1839 penalty minutes, and 827 games played.

== Personal life ==
Currently, Petit resides in The Woodlands, Texas and is a sales manager for Smart Sand, working in Canada and the US. Petit won the 2019 Member Guest at Traditions Club in 2019.

== Career statistics ==
=== Regular season and playoffs ===
			Regular season					Playoffs
Season	Team	League	GP	G	A	Pts	PIM	GP	G	A	Pts	PIM
1979–80	Sainte-Foy Gouverneurs	QMAAA	35	4	9	13	36	12	1	3	4	4
1980–81	Sainte-Foy Gouverneurs	QMAAA	48	10	45	55	84	7	2	4	6	20
1981–82	Sherbrooke Castors	QMJHL	63	10	39	49	106	22	5	20	25	44
1982–83	Saint-Jean Castors	QMJHL	62	19	67	86	196	3	0	0	0	35
1982–83	Vancouver Canucks	NHL	2	0	0	0	0	—	—	—	—	—
1983–84	Canada	Intl	19	3	10	13	58	—	—	—	—	—
1983–84	Vancouver Canucks	NHL	44	6	9	15	53	1	0	0	0	0
1984–85	Vancouver Canucks	NHL	69	5	26	31	127	—	—	—	—	—
1985–86	Fredericton Express	AHL	25	0	13	13	79	—	—	—	—	—
1985–86	Vancouver Canucks	NHL	32	1	6	7	27	—	—	—	—	—
1986–87	Vancouver Canucks	NHL	69	12	13	25	131	—	—	—	—	—
1987–88	Vancouver Canucks	NHL	10	0	3	3	35	—	—	—	—	—
1987–88	New York Rangers	NHL	64	9	24	33	223	—	—	—	—	—
1988–89	New York Rangers	NHL	69	8	25	33	154	4	0	2	2	27
1989–90	Quebec Nordiques	NHL	63	12	24	36	215	—	—	—	—	—
1990–91	Quebec Nordiques	NHL	19	4	7	11	47	—	—	—	—	—
1990–91	Toronto Maple Leafs	NHL	54	9	19	28	132	—	—	—	—	—
1991–92	Toronto Maple Leafs	NHL	34	1	13	14	85	—	—	—	—	—
1991–92	Calgary Flames	NHL	36	3	10	13	79	—	—	—	—	—
1992–93	Calgary Flames	NHL	35	3	9	12	54	—	—	—	—	—
1993–94	Calgary Flames	NHL	63	2	21	23	110	—	—	—	—	—
1994–95	Los Angeles Kings	NHL	40	5	12	17	84	—	—	—	—	—
1995–96	Los Angeles Kings	NHL	9	0	1	1	27	—	—	—	—	—
1995–96	Tampa Bay Lightning	NHL	45	4	7	11	108	6	0	0	0	20
1996–97	Edmonton Oilers	NHL	18	2	4	6	20	—	—	—	—	—
1996–97	Philadelphia Flyers	NHL	20	0	3	3	51	3	0	0	0	6
1997–98	Detroit Vipers	IHL	9	2	3	5	24	—	—	—	—	—
1997–98	Phoenix Coyotes	NHL	32	4	2	6	77	5	0	0	0	8
1998–99	Las Vegas Thunder	IHL	6	0	1	1	10	—	—	—	—	—
1999–2000	Frankfurt Lions	DEL	29	9	9	18	83	5	1	1	2	22
2000–01	Frankfurt Lions	DEL	14	3	13	16	56	—	—	—	—	—
2000–01	Chicago Wolves	IHL	23	2	3	5	26	—	—	—	—	—
2001–02	Bolzano HC	ITA	14	0	2	2	12	—	—	—	—	—
NHL totals			827	90	238	328	1839	19	0	2	2	61

=== International ===
Year	Team	Event	GP	G	A	Pts	PIM
1990	Canada	WC	8	0	1	1	8

Preceded by Garth Butcher	Vancouver Canucks first-round draft pick 1982	Succeeded by Cam Neely
