= 1982–83 QMJHL season =

The 1982–83 QMJHL season was the 14th season in the history of the Quebec Major Junior Hockey League. The league underwent its first expansion since the 1973–74 QMJHL season by adding two new teams in Drummondville and Longueuil. Divisions were restored, and eleven teams played 70 games each in the regular season.

Rookie centreman Pat LaFontaine of the Verdun Juniors posted 234 points in the regular season, the second highest season total in junior ice hockey history at the time, behind only Pierre Larouche's 251 points from the 1973–74 QMJHL season. LaFontaine went on to win six individual trophies at the season's end.

The Longueuil Chevaliers, coached by Jacques Lemaire, set the Canadian Hockey League record for the best first season by an expansion team after posting 37 wins and a winning percentage of 0.557 in 70 games, ahead of the 2003–04 Everett Silvertips with 35 wins and a winning percentage of 0.556 in 72 games. The Chevaliers also became the first expansion team to reach the championship series of the playoffs, a feat later equalled by the Silvertips.

The Laval Voisins and Shawinigan Cataractes both set a QMJHL record with 33 wins on home ice during the regular season. The Laval Voisins finished first overall in the regular season, winning the Jean Rougeau Trophy. The Verdun Juniors won the President's Cup, defeating the Longueuil Chevaliers in the finals.

== Team changes ==
- The Sherbrooke Castors relocate to Saint-Jean-sur-Richelieu, becoming the Saint-Jean Castors.
- The Montreal Juniors relocate to Verdun becoming the Verdun Juniors.
- The Drummondville Voltigeurs join the league as an expansion franchise.
- The Longueuil Chevaliers join the league as an expansion franchise.

== Final standings ==
Note: GP = Games played; W = Wins; L = Losses; T = Ties; Pts = Points; GF = Goals for; GA = Goals against

Dilio Division	GP	W	L	T	Pts	GF	GA
Shawinigan Cataractes	70	52	16	2	106	406	232
Chicoutimi Saguenéens	70	37	32	1	75	397	388
Trois-Rivières Draveurs	70	31	38	1	63	393	414
Quebec Remparts	70	27	43	0	54	317	396
Drummondville Voltigeurs	70	11	57	2	24	249	491

Lebel Division	GP	W	L	T	Pts	GF	GA
Laval Voisins	70	53	17	0	106	452	305
Verdun Juniors	70	50	19	1	101	486	303
Longueuil Chevaliers	70	37	29	4	78	349	333
Saint-Jean Castors	70	28	37	5	61	375	421
Hull Olympiques	70	30	40	0	60	393	406
Granby Bisons	70	20	48	2	42	343	469

- complete list of standings.

== Scoring leaders ==
Note: GP = Games played; G = Goals; A = Assists; Pts = Points; PIM = Penalties in Minutes

Player	Team	GP	G	A	Pts	PIM
Pat LaFontaine	Verdun Juniors	70	104	130	234	10
Claude Verret	Trois-Rivières Draveurs	68	73	115	188	21
Mario Lemieux	Laval Voisins	66	84	100	184	76
Sylvain Turgeon	Hull Olympiques	67	54	109	163	103
Paul Adey	Hull Olympiques	70	58	104	162	14
Jean-Maurice Cool	Verdun Juniors	70	65	84	149	98
Roberto Lavoie	Chicoutimi Saguenéens	59	57	79	136	48
Benoit Doucet	Hull Olympiques	68	61	75	136	53
Guy Pigeon	Saint-Jean / Québec	71	56	77	133	28
Gerard Gallant	Saint-Jean / Verdun	62	54	74	128	244

- complete scoring statistics

== Playoffs ==
Pat LaFontaine was the leading scorer of the playoffs with 35 points (11 goals, 24 assists).

Quarterfinals

- Laval Voisins defeated Hull Olympiques 4 games to 3.
- Shawinigan Cataractes defeated Saint-Jean Castors 4 games to 0.
- Verdun Juniors defeated Trois-Rivières Draveurs 4 games to 0.
- Longueuil Chevaliers defeated Chicoutimi Saguenéens 4 games to 1.

Semifinals

- Longueuil Chevaliers defeated Laval Voisins 4 games to 1.
- Verdun Juniors defeated Shawinigan Cataractes 4 games to 2.

Finals

- Verdun Juniors defeated Longueuil Chevaliers 4 games to 1.

== All-star teams ==
First team

- Goaltender - Mario Gosselin, Shawinigan Cataractes
- Left defence - J. J. Daigneault, Longueuil Chevaliers
- Right defence - Michel Petit, Saint-Jean Castors
- Left winger - Sylvain Turgeon, Hull Olympiques
- Centreman - Pat LaFontaine, Verdun Juniors
- Right winger - Bobby Mormina, Longueuil Chevaliers
- Coach - Jacques Lemaire, Longueuil Chevaliers

Second team

- Goaltender - Luc Guenette, Quebec Remparts
- Left defence - Jocelyn Gauvreau, Granby Bisons
- Right defence - Bobby Dollas, Laval Voisins
- Left winger - Claude Vilgrain, Laval Voisins & Ronald Choules, Trois-Rivières Draveurs
- Centreman - Mario Lemieux, Laval Voisins
- Right winger - Denis Dore, Chicoutimi Saguenéens
- Coach - Ron Lapointe, Shawinigan Cataractes
- List of First/Second/Rookie team all-stars.

== Trophies and awards ==
Team

- President's Cup - Playoff Champions, Verdun Juniors
- Jean Rougeau Trophy - Regular Season Champions, Laval Voisins
- Robert Lebel Trophy - Team with best GAA, Shawinigan Cataractes

Player

- Michel Brière Memorial Trophy - Most Valuable Player, Pat LaFontaine, Verdun Juniors
- Jean Béliveau Trophy - Top Scorer, Pat LaFontaine, Verdun Juniors
- Guy Lafleur Trophy - Playoff MVP, Pat LaFontaine, Verdun Juniors
- Jacques Plante Memorial Trophy - Best GAA, Tony Haladuick, Laval Voisins
- Emile Bouchard Trophy - Defenceman of the Year, J. J. Daigneault, Longueuil Chevaliers
- Mike Bossy Trophy - Best Pro Prospect, Pat LaFontaine, Verdun Juniors & Sylvain Turgeon, Hull Olympiques
- Michel Bergeron Trophy - Offensive Rookie of the Year, Pat LaFontaine, Verdun Juniors
- Raymond Lagacé Trophy - Defensive Rookie of the Year, Bobby Dollas, Laval Voisins
- Frank J. Selke Memorial Trophy - Most sportsmanlike player, Pat LaFontaine, Verdun Juniors
- Marcel Robert Trophy - Best Scholastic Player, Claude Gosselin, Quebec Remparts

== See also ==
- 1983 Memorial Cup
- 1983 NHL entry draft
- 1982–83 OHL season
- 1982–83 WHL season

Preceded by 1981–82 QMJHL season	QMJHL seasons	Succeeded by 1983–84 QMJHL season
