= Sylvain Turgeon =

Canadian ice hockey player (born 1965)

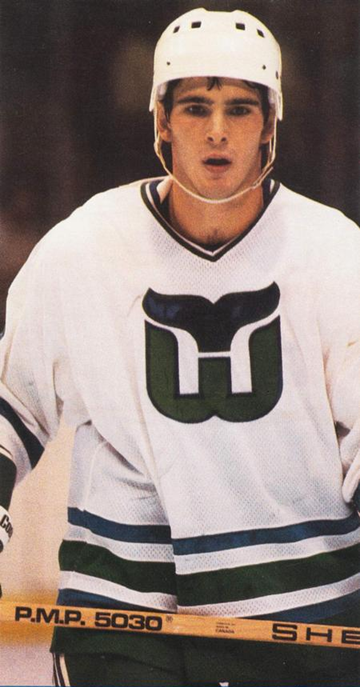
- Turgeon with the Hartford Whalers in 1983
- Born: January 17, 1965 (age 61) Noranda, Quebec, Canada
- Height: 6 ft 0 in (183 cm)
- Weight: 190 lb (86 kg; 13 st 8 lb)
- Position: Left wing
- Shot: Left
- Played for: Hartford Whalers; New Jersey Devils; Montreal Canadiens; Ottawa Senators; HC Bolzano; Wedemark Scorpions; Revierlöwen Oberhausen; SC Herisau; SC Langnau; Kassel Huskies
- NHL draft: 2nd overall, 1983; Hartford Whalers
- Playing career: 1983–2002

Joseph Sylvain Dorilla Turgeon (born January 17, 1965) is a Canadian former professional ice hockey player who played twelve seasons in the National Hockey League (NHL) with the Hartford Whalers, New Jersey Devils, Montreal Canadiens and Ottawa Senators between 1983 and 1995. The older brother of Hockey Hall of Famer Pierre Turgeon, he won the bronze medal with Team Canada at the 1983 World Junior Ice Hockey Championships and he was a member of the 1984 NHL All-Rookie Team and played in the 1986 NHL All-Star Game. He scored the game-winning goal in the Ottawa Senators first-ever game in 1992. Beleaguered by injuries, he spent the remainder of his career from 1995 to 2002 playing for various teams in the minor leagues and in Europe.

== Playing career ==
=== Junior career ===
In the lead up to the Quebec Major Junior Hockey League (QMJHL)'s entry draft in 1981, the owner, the Laval Voisins, of the first overall pick debated between selecting Turgeon or Mario Lemieux. They ultimately chose Lemieux and Turgeon was selected by the Hull Olympiques. In his rookie year in the QMJHL during the 1981–82 season, Turgeon registered 33 goals and 73 points in 57 games. Despite Lemieux, who was also a rookie that season, scoring 30 goals and 96 points in 60 games, Turgeon was awarded the 1982 Michel Bergeron Trophy as offensive rookie of the year. Turgeon's win spurred Lemieux, who became one of hockey's greatest players, to focus entirely on hockey beginning the next season. Turgeon's second season with the Olympiques saw his points total climb to 163, while scoring 54 goals in 67 games. He was awarded the 1983 Mike Bossy Trophy as the league's best prospect and was named to the QMJHL First All-Star Team.

=== Professional ===
==== Hartford Whalers ====
Turgeon was drafted by the Hartford Whalers of the National Hockey League (NHL) in the first round, second overall, in the 1983 NHL entry draft. He did not know how to speak English when he arrived in Hartford and boarded with an English family with whom he learned. His speed and quick, accurate shot made him a key member of the Whalers' power play unit in his first season, playing alongside Ron Francis. He made his NHL debut in the season opener against the Buffalo Sabres on October 5, 1983, playing on a line with Francis and Blaine Stoughton. He registered his NHL point assisting on a goal by Mike Zuke in a 4–1 loss to the Boston Bruins on October 9. He scored his first NHL goal and had his first multi-point NHL game in a 6–4 win over the Pittsburgh Penguins on October 15. He scored on goaltender Michel Dion on the power play in the second period and then assisted on Stoughton's goal later in the period. Turgeon played in 76 games during the 1983–84 season, scoring 40 goals and 72 points and was named to the NHL's 1984 All-Rookie Team. During his first season, Turgeon was involved in a bizarre event in a game versus the Chicago Black Hawks on October 30, 1983. Tom Lysiak of the Black Hawks was kicked out of the faceoff circle by linesman Dan Foyt and another player took his place for the faceoff. The Whalers won the faceoff and on the ensuing play, Turgeon received the puck. However, instead of Lysiak going after the puck and Turgeon, the Black Hawks player intentionally tripped Foyt. For his abuse of the linesman, Lysiak received a twenty-game suspension. In his second year during the 1984–85 season, Turgeon scored 31 goals and 62 points in 64 games but missed 16 games with a pulled stomach muscle early in the season, returning in December. He scored his first NHL hat trick on March 3, 1985 on Frank Caprice in an 7–6 loss to the Vancouver Canucks.

He established career highs of 45 goals and 79 points in 76 games for the Whalers in the 1985–86 season. Turgeon recorded his second career hat trick on December 18, 1985 against Reggie Lemelin in a 4–3 victory over the Calgary Flames. He was named as Francis' replacement as the Whalers' representative on the Wales Conference All-Star Team at the 1986 NHL All-Star Game that took place in Hartford. During the game, he assisted on a goal by Peter Šťastný. The Whalers made the 1986 Stanley Cup playoffs that season, the first time in Turgeon's career. The first series was a best-of-five versus the Quebec Nordiques. In game one, Turgeon scored Hartford's first-ever game-winning goal in the playoffs to give Hartford their first official playoff win. The Whalers went on to win the series, the only playoff series that the team ever won. In the second round they faced the Montreal Canadiens in a best-of-seven series. However, while warming up before game 7 against the Canadiens, Turgeon suffered an abdominal ailment and could not play. Ultimately the Canadiens won the game and the series and the Whalers were eliminated.

The abdominal ailment turned into stomach surgery stemming from an injury to his groin that kept him out of the lineup through the first half of thee 1986–87 season. He returned to the lineup on January 9, 1987 in a 3–0 loss to the Winnipeg Jets. That season saw the height of "Whalermania" and Turgeon was a key component of it, playing on a line with Francis and Kevin Dineen. He scored 23 goals and 36 points in 41 games that season as the Whalers won the Adams Division for the first time. The Whalers went to the playoffs again that season but were eliminated in the first round by the Nordiques. The Whalers struggled during the 1987–88 season, firing their coach in February 1988 and Turgeon reflected that, scoring 23 goals, 49 points in 71 games. The Whalers made the playoffs but were eliminated in the first round again, this time by the Canadiens. Turgeon did register a point in those six games. At the end of the season, the first mentions of a possible trade of Turgeon were raised by the Whalers general manager, Emile Francis. In his final year with Hartford during the 1988–89 season, Turgeon appeared in only 42 games, registering 16 goals and 40 points. He suffered a separated shoulder in a game versus the Boston Bruins on December 19, 1988. He returned to the lineup on March 14, 1989 in an 8–2 victory over the New York Islanders and scored twice in his return. The Whalers faced the Canadiens in the 1989 playoffs and were swept in four games in the first round.

==== New Jersey Devils ====
On June 17, 1989, the day of the 1989 NHL entry draft, the new general manager of the Hartford Whalers Eddie Johnston made his first move, trading Turgeon to the New Jersey Devils for Pat Verbeek. Turgeon was brought to the Devils to help with scoring and his ability to play both wings. He made his 1989–90 season debut on October 5 and scored his third career hat trick, this time against goaltender Ken Wregget, in a 6–2 victory over the Philadelphia Flyers. The now oft-injured Turgeon had been suffering from a slight groin pull for a week when during a game against the Flyers on March 20, he suffered a major pull while being checked by Terry Carkner. He missed the remainder of the regular season. Turgeon scored 30 goals and 47 points in 72 games in his only season with the team. Turgeon returned to the lineup for the Devils' final playoff game, playing on the fourth line, in which the Devils were eliminated by the Washington Capitals in the first round of the 1990 Stanley Cup playoffs.

==== Montreal Canadiens ====
On September 4, 1990, Turgeon was traded by the Devils to the Montreal Canadiens for forward Claude Lemieux. The Canadiens had to trade Lemieux as he did not get along with coach Pat Burns. The Montreal fans were unhappy with the return for Lemieux, however, Lemieux had a reputation in the league and according to Canadiens' general manager Serge Savard, this was the best return they could get. New Jersey sought to replace the loss of Brendan Shanahan and the toughness he brought to the forward group. Turgeon was known as a skill player and Lemieux was known for his ability to disrupt play. However, Turgeon had undergone surgery for a hernia on August 25, 1990 and had been ordered to remain off skates for six to eight weeks.

Turgeon made his Canadiens debut on December 15, 1990 in a 4–2 loss to the Winnipeg Jets. He scored his first goal for the Canadiens in the following game on December 18, a 6–4 loss to the Nordiques. Playing on a line with Stéphan Lebeau and Stéphane Richer, Turgeon had two goals and four points in an 8–4 victory over the Jets on January 31, 1991. On February 6, during a game versus the Chicago Blackhawks, Turgeon blocked a shot with his knee and fractured his right kneecap. He missed the rest of the regular season. He finished the season with five goals and 12 points in 19 games. Turgeon returned to the lineup on April 19 for the second game of the second round series versus the Boston Bruins in the 1991 playoffs. He played in five games in the series, going pointless and was replaced by Ryan Walter for the seventh game, which Montreal lost.

In his second season with the Canadiens, Turgeon scored nine goals and 20 points in 56 games. Turgeon was in and out of the lineup and grew unhappy playing for the Canadiens, sending his agent, Pierre Lacroix, to talk with management about a possible trade in February. After that meeting, Turgeon was scratched for the next fourteen games, only getting back into the lineup on March 21. Turgeon played in the Canadiens' first round series with the Hartford Whalers during the 1992 Stanley Cup playoffs, making his first appearance in game four. He scored his first playoff goal for the Canadiens in game 5 against Frank Pietrangelo, a 7–4 win for the Canadiens. He played the remainder of the series which Montreal won, but played only one game in the second round series with Boston, the final game. The Canadiens were searching for scoring and Turgeon and Lebeau were inserted into the lineup, replacing Chris Nilan and Mike McPhee. The Canadiens lost the game and were swept by the Bruins, ending the Canadiens season.

==== Ottawa Senators ====
The Canadiens left Turgeon unprotected in the 1992 NHL expansion draft and he was the chosen by the Ottawa Senators. He was named an alternate captain as one of the few original Senators established in the NHL. He played in the Senators inaugural game on October 8, 1992 against the Montreal Canadiens and scored the game-winning goal. Turgeon led the expansion Senators in goals scored during the 1992–93 season, registering 25 and 43 points in 72 games. Off the ice, Turgeon was the Senators' National Hockey League Players' Association representative. However, the players grew unhappy with Turgeon in this role and asked teammate Brad Shaw to replace him. The next season, Turgeon was no longer an alternate captain. He scored the fifth hat trick of his career against goaltender Ron Hextall of the New York Islanders on October 23, 1993, registering the 250th goal of his career in the process. In the next game on October 25 versus the Mighty Ducks of Anaheim, Turgeon's left forearm was fractured in a collision with teammate Dennis Vial in the third period. After missing 37 games, Turgeon returned to the Senators' lineup on January 10, 1994 in a 3–3 tie with the Islanders. Turgeon had two assists and was named the first star of the match. He finished the season with 11 goals and 26 points in 47 games. Turgeon's final NHL season was the lockout-shortened 1994–95 season with the Senators. He scored 11 goals and 19 points in 33 games.

==== Minor leagues and Europe ====
Turgeon attended the Senators 1995 training camp, but a week before its end in September 1995, he was dropped from the team. He joined the Houston Aeros of the International Hockey League (IHL) on October 13 for the 1995–96 season. He scored 28 goals and 31 assists for 59 points in 65 games for Houston, and represented the team at the 1996 IHL All-Star Game. An unrestricted free agent at the end of the year, Turgeon chose to play in Europe beginning in 1996. He played for various European teams in Germany, Italy, and Switzerland until 2002.

== International play ==
Medal record

Ice hockey

Representing Canada

World Junior Championships
Bronze medal – third place	1983 Soviet Union	

Turgeon was selected to play for Canada's junior team at the 1983 World Junior Ice Hockey Championships in Leningrad, Soviet Union. He was one three 17-year old players on the team, the others being Mario Lemieux and Steve Yzerman. Turgeon played in seven games, had four goals and six points as the team finished third in the tournament, winning the bronze medal. In August 1987, Turgeon was among those invited to Team Canada's selection camp for the 1987 Canada Cup. However, during a drill in practice, Turgeon attempted to retrieve the puck from between goaltender Ron Hextall's skates and jostled the goaltender, knocking him off his feet. Hextall's stick came down and struck Turgeon's arm, breaking it and causing Turgeon to miss the tournament. Turgeon was named to Canada's Spengler Cup team for the 1996 tournament. Turgeon scored a hat trick in the final, a 6–2 victory over HC Davos on December 31, 1996.

== Personal life ==
Turgeon is the older brother of former NHL player Pierre Turgeon. His nephew, Dominic Turgeon (Pierre's son), was drafted by the Detroit Red Wings in the 2014 NHL entry draft.

Turgeon's trading card from the 1994–95 Pinnacle hockey set (which also featured future Hockey Hall of Fame member Dale Hawerchuk) unexpectedly jumped in value in 2007, from US$0.10 to more than $70 (equivalent to $109 in 2025), when 2007 first overall draft pick (later 2008 Rookie of the Year) Patrick Kane – then six-years-old – was spotted sitting on his father's lap in the stands, right at the glass, in the right-hand side of the card.

== Career statistics ==
=== Regular season and playoffs ===
			Regular season					Playoffs
Season	Team	League	GP	G	A	Pts	PIM	GP	G	A	Pts	PIM
1980–81	Bourassa Angevins	QMAAA	43	34	44	78	87	11	13	9	22	30
1981–82	Hull Olympiques	QMJHL	57	33	40	73	72	14	11	11	22	16
1982–83	Hull Olympiques	QMJHL	67	54	109	163	105	7	8	7	15	10
1983–84	Hartford Whalers	NHL	76	40	32	72	55	—	—	—	—	—
1984–85	Hartford Whalers	NHL	64	31	31	62	67	—	—	—	—	—
1985–86	Hartford Whalers	NHL	76	45	34	79	88	9	2	3	5	4
1986–87	Hartford Whalers	NHL	41	23	13	36	45	6	1	2	3	4
1987–88	Hartford Whalers	NHL	71	23	26	49	71	6	0	0	0	4
1988–89	Hartford Whalers	NHL	42	16	14	30	40	4	0	2	2	4
1989–90	New Jersey Devils	NHL	72	30	17	47	81	1	0	0	0	0
1990–91	Montreal Canadiens	NHL	19	5	7	12	20	5	0	0	0	2
1991–92	Montreal Canadiens	NHL	56	9	11	20	39	5	1	0	1	4
1992–93	Ottawa Senators	NHL	72	25	18	43	104	—	—	—	—	—
1993–94	Ottawa Senators	NHL	47	11	15	26	52	—	—	—	—	—
1994–95	Ottawa Senators	NHL	33	11	8	19	29	—	—	—	—	—
1995–96	Houston Aeros	IHL	65	28	31	59	66	—	—	—	—	—
1996–97	HC Bolzano	ITA	23	14	11	25	22	—	—	—	—	—
1996–97	Wedemark Scorpions	DEL	12	5	8	13	12	8	5	2	7	41
1996–97	EHC Olten	NLB	9	10	2	12	38	—	—	—	—	—
1997–98	Revier Löwen Oberhausen	DEL	28	11	15	26	24	—	—	—	—	—
1997–98	SC Herisau	NLA	14	9	2	11	26	—	—	—	—	—
1998–99	SC Langnau	NLA	5	1	1	2	4	—	—	—	—	—
1998–99	Kassel Huskies	DEL	34	20	8	28	32	—	—	—	—	—
1999–2000	Kassel Huskies	DEL	49	32	13	45	49	8	2	2	4	10
2000–01	Kassel Huskies	DEL	58	15	10	25	44	8	0	3	3	2
2001–02	HC Thurgau	NLB	19	8	7	15	53	—	—	—	—	—
NHL totals			669	269	226	495	691	36	4	7	11	22
DEL totals			181	83	54	137	161	24	7	7	14	53

=== International ===
Year	Team	Event	Result	GP	G	A	Pts	PIM
1983	Canada	WJC	3rd place, bronze medalist(s)	7	4	2	6	8
1996	Canada	SC	1st place, gold medalist(s)	4	2	2	4	0
Junior totals				7	4	2	6	8
Senior totals				4	2	2	4	0

== Awards and honours ==
Award	Year
QMJHL
Michel Bergeron Trophy	1982
First All-Star Team	1983
Mike Bossy Trophy	1983
NHL
All-Rookie Team	1984
DEL
All-Star Team	2001

== See also ==
- Notable families in the NHL

== Citations ==
Awards and achievements
Preceded by Paul Lawless	Hartford Whalers first-round draft pick 1983	Succeeded by Sylvain Côté
