= Derick Brassard =

Canadian ice hockey player (born 1987)

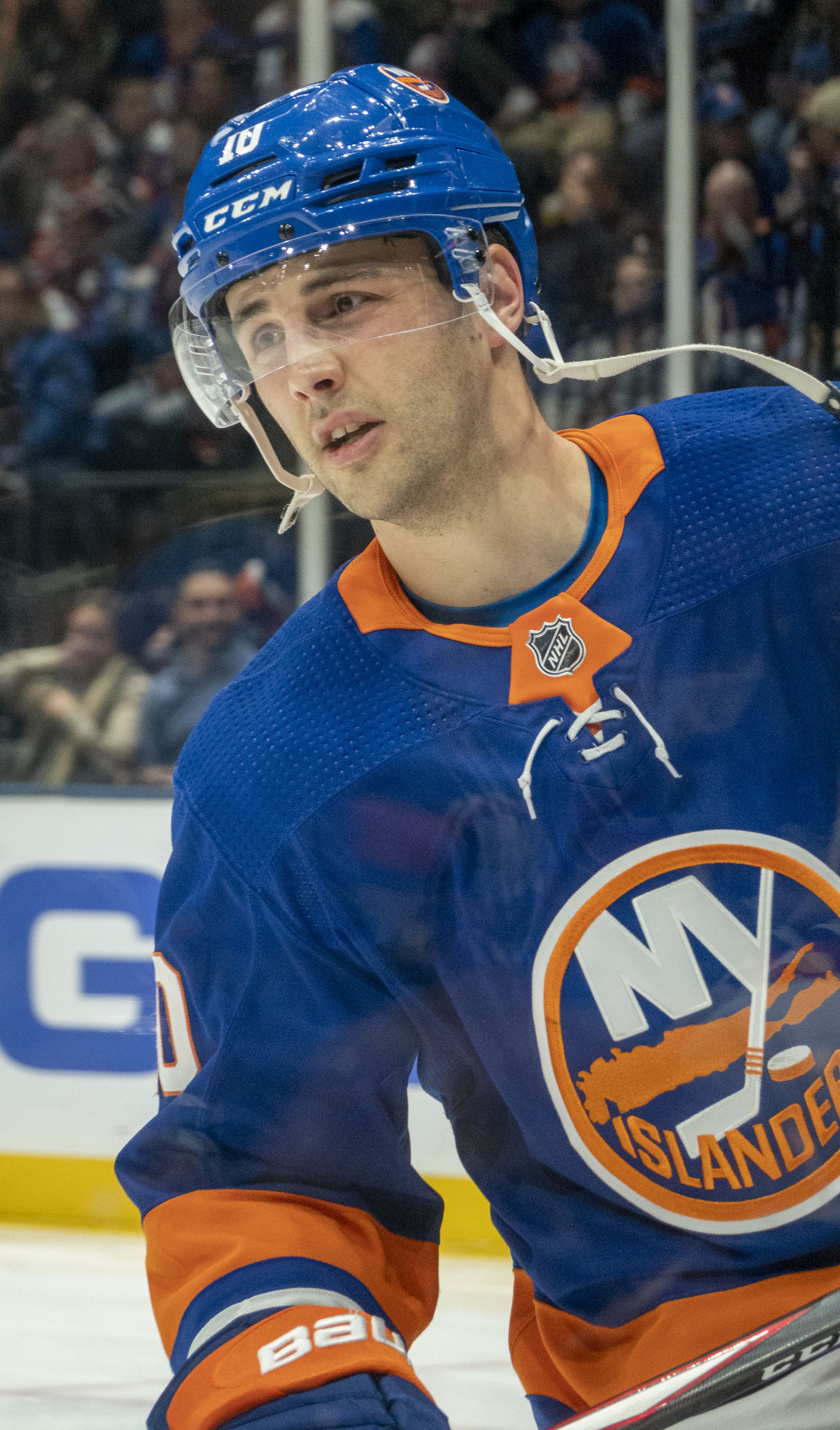
- Brassard with the New York Islanders in 2020
- Born: September 22, 1987 (age 39) Hull, Quebec, Canada
- Height: 6 ft 1 in (185 cm)
- Weight: 202 lb (92 kg; 14 st 6 lb)
- Position: Centre
- Shot: Left
- Played for: Columbus Blue Jackets; New York Rangers; Ottawa Senators; Pittsburgh Penguins; Florida Panthers; Colorado Avalanche; New York Islanders; Arizona Coyotes; Philadelphia Flyers; Edmonton Oilers; Genève-Servette HC
- National team: Canada
- NHL draft: 6th overall, 2006; Columbus Blue Jackets
- Playing career: 2007–2023: 2025–2026

Derick Brassard (born September 22, 1987) is a Canadian former professional ice hockey centre who played 16 seasons in the National Hockey League (NHL) for the Columbus Blue Jackets, New York Rangers, Ottawa Senators, Pittsburgh Penguins, Florida Panthers, Colorado Avalanche, New York Islanders, Arizona Coyotes, Philadelphia Flyers and Edmonton Oilers, as well as a brief stint in the Swiss National League (NL) with Genève-Servette HC. The Blue Jackets selected him in the first round, sixth overall, of the 2006 NHL entry draft.

Born and raised in Hull, Quebec, Brassard grew up attending ice hockey games at the Robert Guertin Centre. He began ice skating at the age of five and played minor ice hockey for the Gatineau L'Intrépide. The Drummondville Voltigeurs of the Quebec Major Junior Hockey League (QMJHL) selected Brassard 18th overall in 2003, and he joined the team as a rookie in the 2004–05 season. After recording 25 goals and 76 points, Brassard received both the Michel Bergeron Trophy and RDS Cup at the end of his rookie season. He doubled his offensive production the next season and received the Michael Bossy Trophy for the top prospect in the QMJHL. Brassard missed most of his final junior ice hockey season after suffering a shoulder subluxation during a preseason game.

Brassard spent most of the 2007–08 season in the American Hockey League with the Syracuse Crunch, save for a brief stint in the NHL in January and February. The following season, he was one of several rookies to make the Blue Jackets' opening night roster. Brassard missed large parts of the 2008–09 and 2009–10 seasons with injuries, but he broke out offensively in 2010–11. The next two seasons were hindered by clashes with coach Scott Arniel and the 2012–13 NHL lockout, and Brassard was traded to the Rangers at the 2013 trading deadline. Brassard reached the Stanley Cup playoffs all four seasons he was with the Rangers, including their loss to the Los Angeles Kings in the 2014 Stanley Cup Final.

The Rangers traded Brassard to the Senators before the 2016–17 season, where he struggled with coach Guy Boucher's frequent offensive line adjustments. He found more difficulties in Pittsburgh due to injuries and limited playing time on the lower lines. By 2019, Brassard had become an NHL journeyman: the Penguins traded him to the Florida Panthers, who flipped him to the Avalanche three weeks later. He spent a year apiece with the Islanders and Coyotes before joining the Flyers for the 2021–22 season. Brassard's trade deadline move to the Oilers made him one of nine NHL players to dress for 10 or more teams in his career.

Brassard returned to the Ottawa Senators on a professional tryout for the 2022–23 season. After a solid showing in training camp, he was awarded a one-year contract. On March 2, 2023, Brassard played in his 1,000th NHL game.

== Early life ==
Brassard was born on September 22, 1987, in Hull, Quebec, to Suzanne and Pierre Brassard. His father was a star junior ice hockey player for the Pembroke Lumber Kings of the Central Junior Hockey League and was selected by the Montreal Canadiens of the National Hockey League (NHL) in the 1976 NHL entry draft. Pierre was cut from the team after training camp, however, and did not play in the NHL. Brassard began ice skating at the age of five, and he took up hockey shortly after that. He was raised near the Robert Guertin Centre and would often attend ice hockey games held there. Brassard played minor ice hockey with the Gatineau L'Intrépide; during the 2003–04 season, he scored 19 goals and 64 points in 32 games.

== Playing career ==
=== Junior ===
The Drummondville Voltigeurs of the Quebec Major Junior Hockey League (QMJHL) selected Brassard in the second round, 18th overall, of the 2003 draft. He played in only 10 games during the 2003–04 season, spending most of the time with the Gatineau L'Intrépide, but recorded one assist in those 10 games. He also appeared in seven postseason games but did not record a point in any of them. The following season he joined Drummondville in full, and by the end of November, Brassard led the Voltigeurs with 11 goals and 25 points, including five power play goals, and he was named the QMJHL Offensive Player of the Week for the week ending November 29. He was named the QMJHL Rookie of the Month for December 2004 after recording four goals and 15 points in 10 games, including two power play goals and three game-winners. Brassard took home the honour again the next month when he recorded three goals and 11 assists in 13 games, including a four-assist game against the Quebec Remparts on January 25. Brassard finished his first full QMJHL season with 25 goals and 76 points in 69 regular season games, as well as one goal and six points in six playoff games. He was awarded both the Michel Bergeron Trophy for the offensive rookie of the year and the RDS Cup for the Rookie of the Year, and he was named to the QMJHL All-Rookie Team.

Brassard had a hot start to the 2005–06 season, with 18 points through the first week of October. He missed most of November with a broken wrist but returned once the cast was removed, recording two assists in his first game back. During the year, he was named both to the Canadian roster for the ADT Canada–Russia Challenge and to Team Cherry at the CHL/NHL Top Prospects Game. Brassard doubled his offensive output between the 2004–05 and 2005–06 seasons, finishing with 44 goals and 116 points in 58 games for the Voltigeurs. At the end of the season, he was named to the QMJHL First All-Star Team and was awarded the Michael Bossy Trophy for the best prospect in the QMJHL. That June, the Columbus Blue Jackets of the NHL selected Brassard in the first round, sixth overall, in the 2006 NHL entry draft. He signed a three-year, entry-level contract with Columbus in September.

During the Voltigeurs' 2006 preseason training camp, Brassard suffered a subluxated shoulder after a check from Bryan Main of the Gatineau Olympiques. The injury kept him from attending the Blue Jackets' training camp and potentially gaining a place on their opening night roster. The injury required surgery that would keep Brassard out of both the Blue Jackets' and Voltigeurs' line-up until at least March. At that point, he would be eligible to finish out Drummondville's season before joining the Syracuse Crunch, the American Hockey League (AHL) affiliate of the Blue Jackets. Doctors cleared him to play for Drummondville on February 15, 2007, with just over one month remaining in the QMJHL season. He missed a total of 56 games with the injury but began scoring as soon as he returned, with 17 points in his first nine games of the season. In 14 regular-season games after his return, Brassard scored six goals and recorded 25 points. He added nine goals and 15 assists in 12 postseason games before the Voltigeurs were eliminated by the Rouyn-Noranda Huskies in the second round of QMJHL playoffs. Brassard finished his junior ice hockey career with 218 points in 151 games, and the Voltigeurs retired his No. 61 jersey in 2016.

=== Professional ===
==== Columbus Blue Jackets (2007–2013) ====
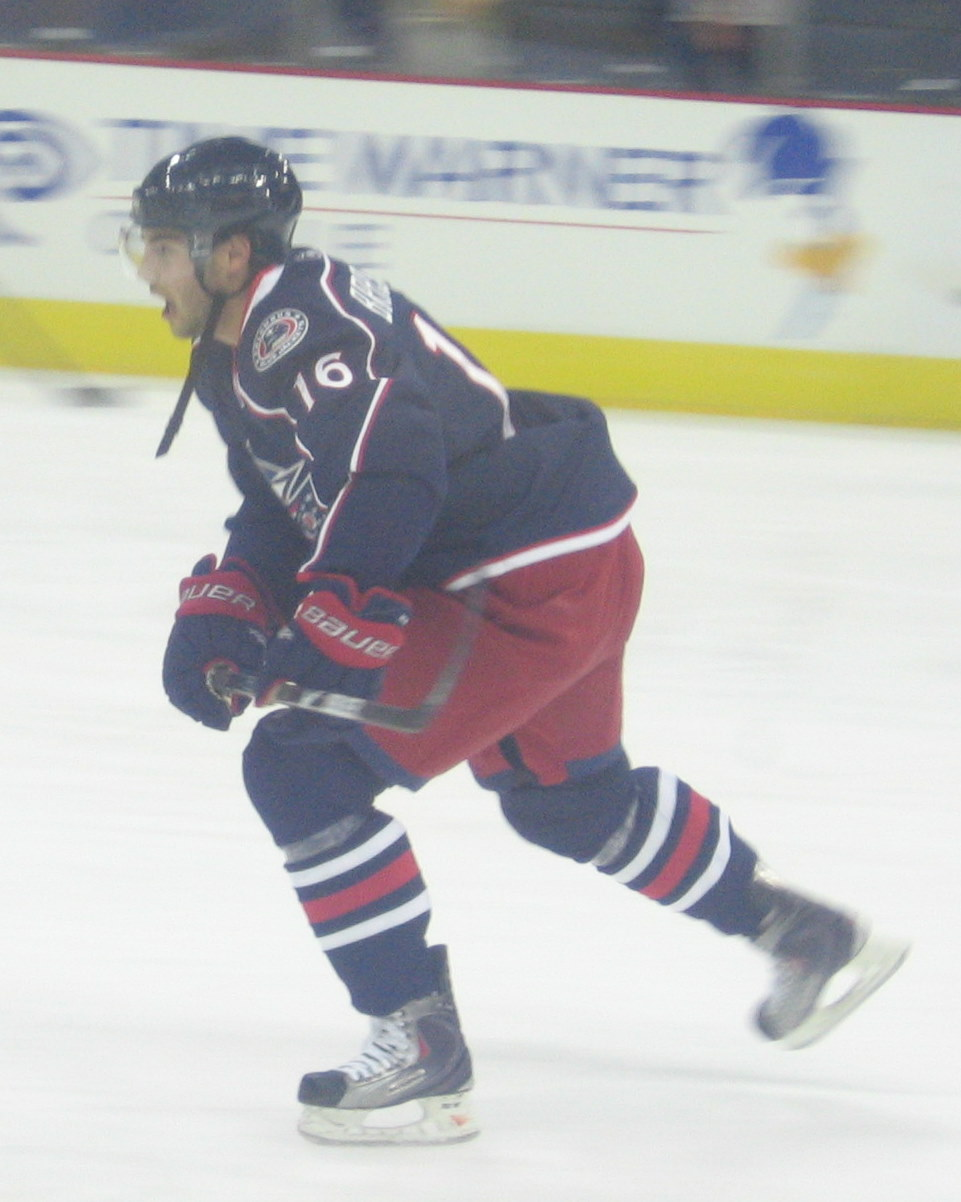
Brassard with the Blue Jackets in 2009

After spending training camp and the NHL preseason with Columbus, Brassard was assigned to the Syracuse Crunch, the Blue Jackets' AHL affiliate, to begin the 2007–08 season. On November 13, he suffered a fractured mandible after colliding with Derek Dorsett during a practice skate, and he spent six weeks recovering from the injury. Despite this setback, Brassard scored five goals and 20 assists in his first 21 games with Syracuse, and he received an invitation to play in the 2008 AHL All-Star Game shortly before being called up to Columbus on January 10, 2008. He made his NHL debut that night, wearing No. 16 and centering the fourth line with Jody Shelley and Jared Boll for a game against the St. Louis Blues. He recorded his first NHL point on January 20 with an assist on Fredrik Modin's late-game goal against the Colorado Avalanche. On February 7, Brassard scored his first NHL goal in a 4–1 loss to the Minnesota Wild. Those were his only points in 17 games for Columbus, and he was sent back down to Syracuse on February 26. Brassard played a total of 46 games for the Crunch, recording 15 goals and 36 assists for a team that fell to the Toronto Marlies in the second round of Calder Cup playoffs.

Brassard was one of several rookies named to the Blue Jackets' opening night roster for the 2008–09 season, part of a new core of young players that also included Nikita Filatov and Jakub Voráček. He primarily skated on a productive rookie line with Voráček and Jason Chimera. Through the first seven games of the 2008–09 season, Brassard had two goals and four assists, while Chimera and Voráček combined for an additional three goals and three assists. He took home the NHL Rookie of the Month title that October after leading all freshman players with four goals and five assists through the first 10 games of the season, and seemed poised for a break-out season by December. On December 19, 2008, however, Brassard suffered a separated shoulder during a fight with Dallas Stars forward James Neal. The injury ultimately required a season-ending surgery, bringing Brassard's break-out season to a premature end. At the time, he continued to lead all rookies in scoring with 10 goals and 15 assists through 31 games.

On September 4, 2009, the Blue Jackets signed Brassard to a four-year contract extension that would keep him under team control through the 2013–14 season. Fully recovered by the beginning of the 2009–10 season, Brassard rejoined Filatov and Voráček on the second offensive line. He struggled at the start of the season with the return from his shoulder injury, telling ESPN that he was "just not playing like a great player" before snapping a 14-game scoring drought with a late goal in Columbus's 3–0 win over the Florida Panthers on December 10. On February 14, Brassard burned his left hand from the thumb to the index finger while attempting to repair his hockey stick with hot glue. The burn became infected, causing Brassard to miss several games in March. Upon his return, he was offered ample playing time from new head coach Claude Noel after several other player injuries created gaps in the line-up. Brassard finished the season with nine goals and 36 points in 79 games, while his −17 plus–minus was tied with defenceman Anton Strålman for the worst on the team. Although young players like Brassard improved after Noel replaced Hitchcock, the Blue Jackets' 3–14–7 record from November 21 to January 5 kept them out of contention in the 2010 Stanley Cup playoffs.

When Scott Arniel took over coaching duties in Columbus for the 2010–11 season, he placed Brassard on the top offensive line with Voráček and captain Rick Nash. In the first ten games since putting that trio together, Brassard recorded five goals and seven assists, and his face-off percentage improved significantly. On February 16, 2011, Brassard injured his left hand after being struck by a Jan Hejda slapshot in the Blue Jackets' game against the Los Angeles Kings. Although the hand was not fractured, he was placed on injured reserve regardless. At the time of the injury, Brassard had a career-high 14 goals and 39 points through 57 games, including five goals and eight assists in the last 14 games before the injury. He missed eight games with the injury before being activated on March 9. Although the Blue Jackets went only 34–35–13 for the season and missed the 2011 Stanley Cup playoffs, Brassard had a break-out season, setting career highs with 17 goals, 30 assists, and 47 points.

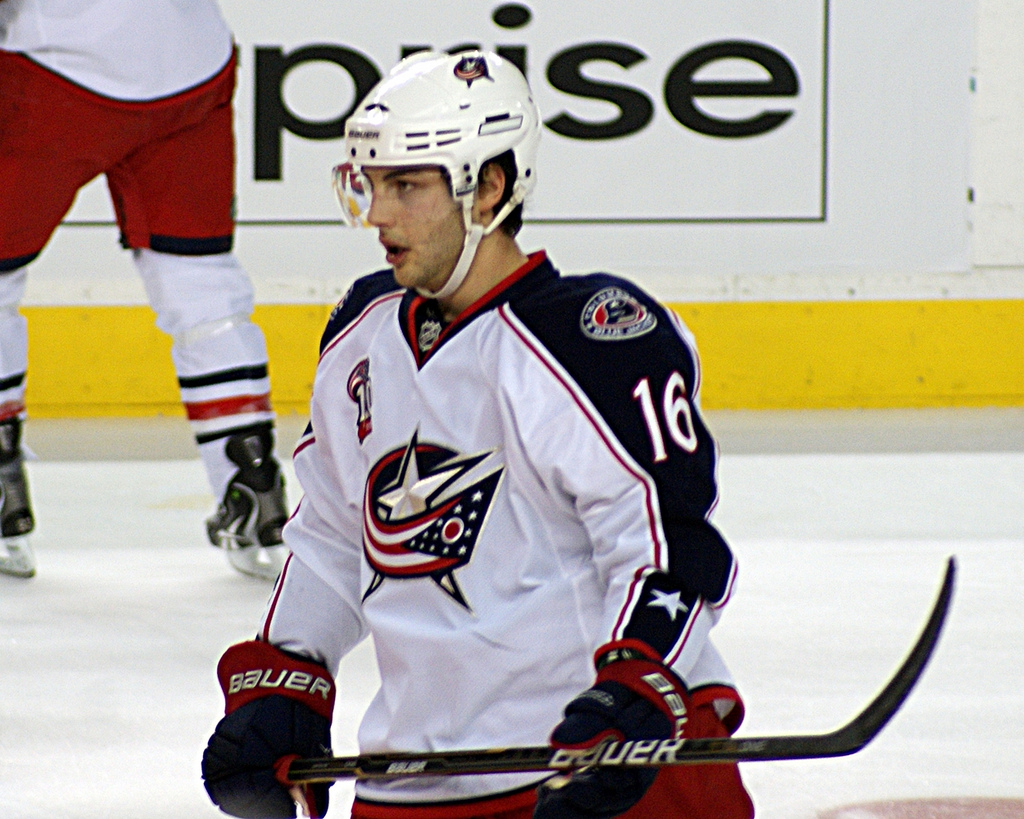
Brassard with the Blue Jackets in 2010

The Blue Jackets made a number of roster changes going into the 2011–12 season: new centers Jeff Carter and Ryan Johansen moved Brassard to the wing, and then rookie Cam Atkinson usurped him on the top two offensive lines. He began the season in a slump, with only two goals and four points through his first 19 games, as well as a −10 rating, and Arniel frequently relegated Brassard to a healthy scratch by early December. On December 7, 2011, after Brassard's seventh healthy scratch of the season, his agent Allan Walsh wrote on Twitter accused Arniel of "singl[ing] out" Brasard "to be the fall guy in case things don't go well", describing the coach as having "a history of burying players and using them as scapegoats to mask his own lack of success on the ice". Brassard showed a midseason resurgence, with nine points in a 12-game stretch by mid-January that coincided with Arniel's firing. He was particularly successful with Nash around the month of February, recording 14 points in a 15-game span when paired with the captain. Brassard recorded his 100th career assist in the final game of the season, a 7–3 victory over the New York Islanders. After recording only two goals and five points through the first 24 games of the season, he finished the year with 14 goals and 41 points in 74 games.

When a lockout indefinitely delayed the beginning of the 2012–13 hockey season, Brassard was one of many NHL players to sign a short-term contract with a European ice hockey team, joining EC Red Bull Salzburg of the Erste Bank Eishockey Liga. After skating in six games with Salzburg, during which he scored four goals and recorded an assist, Brassard abruptly left the team, telling reporters that he planned to return home and wait out the remainder of the lockout. At this point, Derek Dorsett, Tobias Enström, and David Clarkson had all left Red Bull on poor terms, with at least one player labelling the team "a joke". Salzburg coach Pierre Page, who had previously coached several NHL teams, had a demanding and confrontational reputation that may have played a role in his poor relationship with players like Brassard. A representative from Red Bull released a statement saying that they would be filing a breach of contract notification with the International Ice Hockey Federation, while Brassard's agent told reporters that there was "no more unprofessional organization in all of Europe" than Salzburg.

The NHL lockout came to an end on January 5, 2013, and Brassard departed for Columbus shortly after the announcement was made. In their first game of the truncated season, Brassard scored the game-winning goal in the sixth round of a shootout victory over the Nashville Predators, the first time that Columbus had taken the first game of a season since 2009. The Blue Jackets' season, however, was largely hindered by a number of injuries, and Brassard was one of many skaters to miss time around the beginning of March after suffering an upper-body injury in a game against the Dallas Stars. In 34 games with Columbus that season, Brassard scored seven goals and 11 assists.

==== New York Rangers (2013–2016) ====
One of the largest trading deadline deals of the 2012–13 season occurred on April 3, 2013, when the New York Rangers traded Marián Gáborík, one of their top goal scorers, and two prospect players to the Blue Jackets in exchange for Brassard, Derek Dorsett, John Moore, and a sixth-round pick in the 2014 NHL entry draft. Brassard arrived at Madison Square Garden about 15 minutes before pregame warmups that night, and proceeded to contribute a goal and three assists in the Rangers' 6–1 rout of the Pittsburgh Penguins. He recorded 11 points in the last 13 regular season games of the lockout-truncated season before joining the Rangers for the 2013 Stanley Cup playoffs. It was Brassard's first postseason appearance, as he was still recovering from his shoulder injury when Columbus reached the playoffs in 2009. He was one of the most valuable offensive players in the Rangers' playoff run, with three points in Game 3 of New York's first-round series against the Washington Capitals, six points through his first five postseason games, and 12 points through his entire 12-game playoff run. The Rangers were eliminated from the playoffs by the Boston Bruins in the second round.

The Rangers made a number of changes to their starting line-up for the 2013–14 season, with Brassard centering a second line that also featured Benoit Pouliot and Mats Zuccarello. Brassard also reconciled with Arniel before the season began, as his former Columbus coach took an assistant coaching position on the Rangers. Brassard began the season in a slump, and after being criticized by coach Alain Vigneault for his lack of production, he scored his first goal of the year on October 26, a game-winning breakaway past Jimmy Howard of the Detroit Red Wings with 12.6 seconds remaining in overtime. After missing time in December with a bruised coccyx, Brassard recorded his 200th NHL point with an assist against the Tampa Bay Lightning on December 29. Brassard struggled with the frequent line adjustments Vigneault made through the first half of the season, but after finding stable chemistry with Benoit Pouliot and Mats Zuccarello, he improved, scoring nine points in 11 games by mid-January. After finishing the regular season with 18 goals and 45 points, Brassard left practice before the first game of the 2014 Stanley Cup playoffs with a lower back injury. He missed the first game of the Rangers' opening-round playoff series against the Philadelphia Flyers but returned for game two, scoring four goals and seven points in 14 playoff games, including two game-winning goals against the Pittsburgh Penguins. Brassard was injured again in the first game of the Eastern Conference finals when he was shouldered by Montreal Canadiens' skater Mike Weaver. Brassard returned for game four, scoring a goal in the Rangers' 3–2 victory. He finished the Rangers' postseason run with six goals and 12 points in 23 playoff games before the Los Angeles Kings defeated New York in the 2014 Stanley Cup Final.

On July 27, 2014, Brassard, a restricted free agent, agreed to a five-year, $25 million contract extension with the Rangers. After Derek Stepan fractured his left fibula during the preseason, Brassard became the Rangers' No. 1 center for the 2014–15 season. There, he was paired with former Columbus teammate Rick Nash and Martin St. Louis, who had been moved from centre to the wing after struggling in his first 10 games. In December, Brassard was one of several NHL players to contract the mumps during a league-wide outbreak. Although the case was mild, Brassard's mandatory quarantine left him unable to exercise, and he described himself as "rusty" when returning to practice. Brassard finished the regular season with 19 goals and 41 assists, most of which came on Nash's 42 season goals. He added an additional nine goals and 16 points in the 2015 Stanley Cup playoffs, including a hat-trick to keep the Rangers from being eliminated in game six of the Eastern Conference Finals. The Lightning defeated the Rangers in game seven, however, eliminating them from playoff contention.

Vigneault spent the first month of the 2015–16 season shuffling his forward lines, ultimately reuniting Brassard, who had five points through ten games, with Nash and Zuccarello. After Stepan fractured his ribs, Brassard once again took on a leadership role among the Rangers' centers, with Vigneault pressuring him to "compete harder" in the first half of the season. On January 25, the final game before the NHL All-Star Game break, Brassard had a career-high five points (two goals and three assists) in a regular-season game when the Rangers won 6–3 over the Buffalo Sabres. It was the first regular-season five-point game of any Rangers skater since Ryan Callahan five years prior. Playing in 80 regular-season games, Brassard finished with 58 points, including a career-high 27 goals. The Penguins eliminated the Rangers in the first round of the 2016 Stanley Cup playoffs, with Brassard's three points in five postseason games leading the team.

==== Ottawa Senators (2016–2018) ====
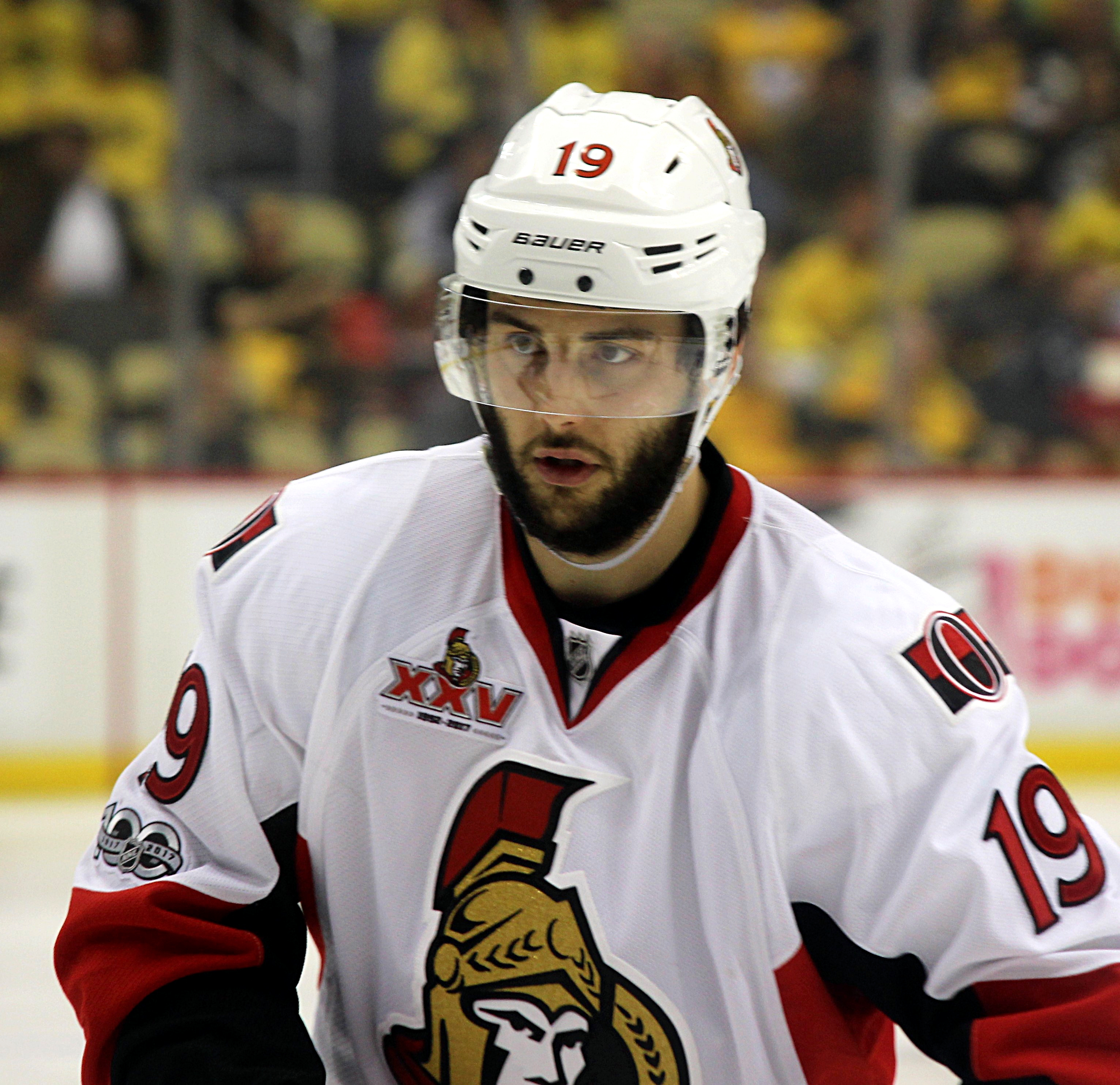
Brassard with the Senators in 2017

After three seasons with the Rangers, Brassard was the team's first offseason move in 2016, when he was traded to the Ottawa Senators on July 18 in exchange for Mika Zibanejad, who was "younger and faster" than Brassard. Although both teams had discussed the details of the trade earlier, Ottawa general manager Pierre Dorion wanted to wait until after July 15 to sign off on the deal, as it forced the Rangers to retain Brassard's $2 million signing bonus. Brassard joined the second line on his new team, serving as a left-handed skater to counterbalance first- and third-line centers Kyle Turris and Jean-Gabriel Pageau. He opened the 2016–17 season in a scoring slump: his only goal in the first 15 games of the year came in the season opener, although he had an additional five assists in that same span. He told reporters that it took "a while to adjust" to the new team, particularly coach Guy Boucher's affinity for changing offensive lines every game, but Brassard managed to finish the regular season with 14 goals and 39 points in 80 games. The Senators clinched a spot in the 2017 Stanley Cup playoffs, and Brassard recorded an additional eight points in their first-round victory over the Boston Bruins. Ottawa faced the Rangers in the second round of playoffs, and Brassard scored against his old team in the 3–1 series-clinching victory. Altogether, Brassard had 11 points in 19 postseason games before Ottawa was ousted by the Pittsburgh Penguins in the Eastern Conference finals.

After the Senators were eliminated from the 2017 Stanley Cup playoffs, the team revealed that Brassard had a torn glenoid labrum in his right shoulder that would require surgical repair, and that he was expected to require four to five months of recovery time. His recovery progressed on time, and Brassard was able to join the Senators by opening night of the 2017–18 season. Although Brassard individually played well, with nine goals and 23 points through the first 35 games of the season, the Senators as a whole were not effective, with losses in 16 of their last 39 games before the new year. As the trading deadline approached, Brassard went on another hot streak, with three goals in as many games as he made himself an attractive trade target. In 58 games with Ottawa that season, Brassard scored 18 goals and recorded an additional 20 assists.

==== Pittsburgh Penguins (2018–2019) ====
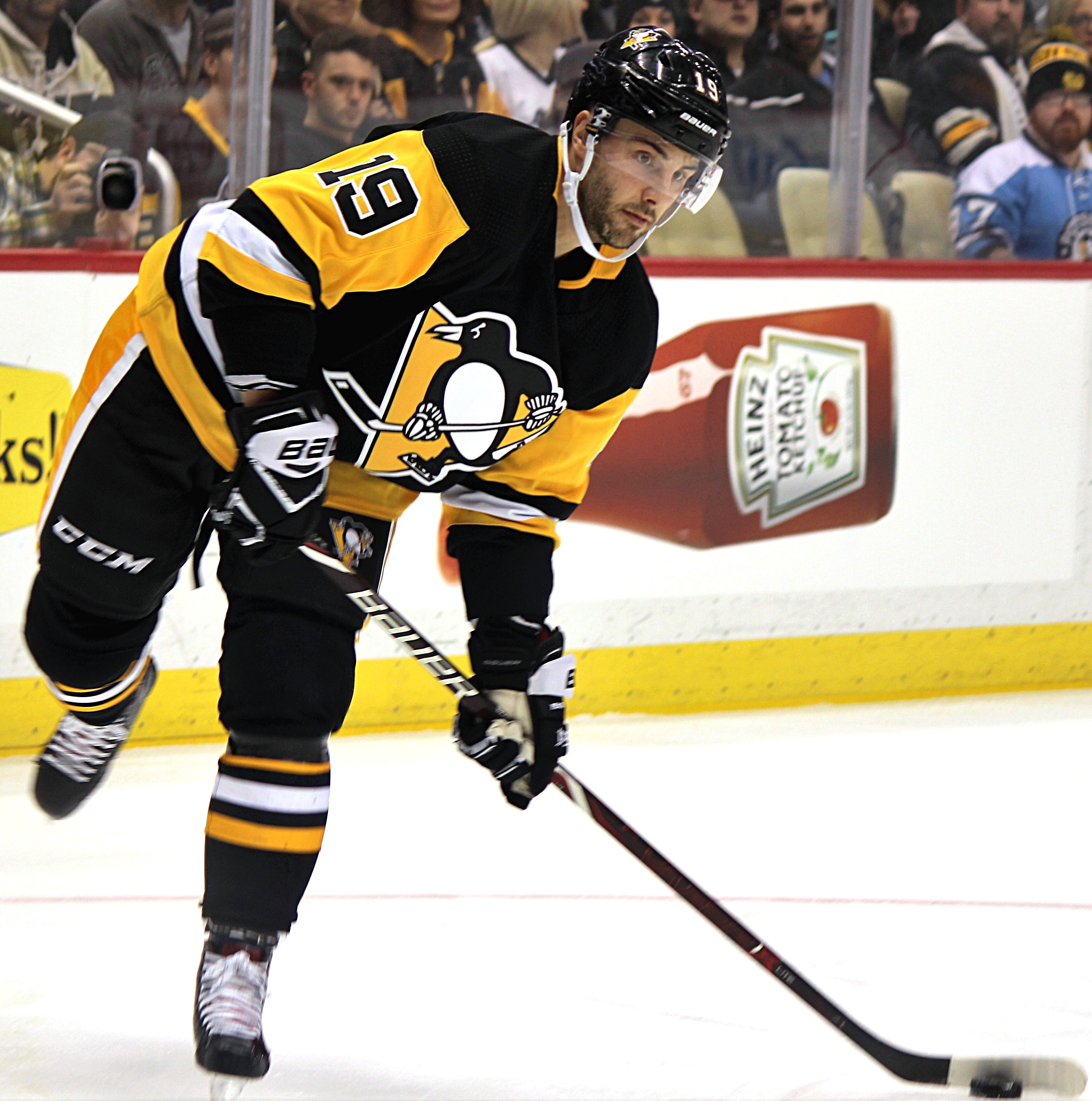
Brassard with the Penguins in 2018

On February 23, 2018, Brassard was part of what Pittsburgh Penguins' general manager Jim Rutherford called "the most complex trade" of his career. Ottawa traded Brassard, prospect Vincent Dunn, and a third-round selection in the 2018 NHL entry draft to Pittsburgh, who sent Ottawa Ian Cole, prospect Filip Gustavsson, a first-round pick in the 2018 draft, and a third-round pick in the 2019 NHL entry draft. The Vegas Golden Knights, meanwhile, received Ryan Reaves and a fourth-round 2018 draft pick from the Penguins, while trading prospect Tobias Lindberg to Pittsburgh and offering to retain 40 per cent of Brassard's remaining salary. The latter configuration was necessary for the Penguins to remain within the bounds of the NHL salary cap. The Penguins were interested in acquiring Brassard in order to take the Metropolitan Division from the Washington Capitals, while Vegas agreed to retain a portion of Brassard's salary to ensure that he was traded to an Eastern Conference team that would see little playing time against the Golden Knights. Although Brassard had a strong finish to the regular season, with eight points in his first 14 games with the Penguins, he had an unusually difficult postseason stretch in the 2018 Stanley Cup playoffs, with one goal and three assists in 12 games. The Washington Capitals eliminated the Penguins from the playoffs in the second round. Brassard, meanwhile, attributed his postseason difficulties to a groin injury that he had suffered during the regular season, and his subsequent demotion to the fourth line.

Brassard had a slow start to the 2018–19 season, with only one goal and four assists through eight games before suffering another groin injury on October 27 that caused him to miss nine games. He continued to struggle upon returning to the line-up, with only three points in 17 games by the Christmas break. In addition to lower body injuries limiting Brassard's effectiveness on the ice, he lacked stable linemates: although he seemed comfortable on captain Sidney Crosby's left wing, that position was filled by Jake Guentzel, and Brassard was subsequently demoted to third-line center. In 40 games for Pittsburgh during the 2018–19 season, Brassard scored only nine goals and a total of 15 points. He told reporters after the fact that he had difficulties finding a permanent, rewarding role within the Penguins organization. In addition to feeling outcast among Pittsburgh's strong core of skaters, Brassard had set personal goals of 50 to 60 points that season, which was made difficult by the limited playing time of a bottom-six forward.

==== Florida Panthers and Colorado Avalanche (2019) ====
On February 1, 2019, the Penguins traded Brassard, Riley Sheahan, and three picks in the 2019 NHL entry draft to the Florida Panthers in exchange for Nick Bjugstad and Jared McCann. Both Brassard and Sheahan were set to become unrestricted free agents at the end of the season, and the Panthers, with three and a half weeks before the trading deadline, were open to flipping both players at the deadline. He played one game in his usual third line position, centreing Aleksander Barkov and Vincent Trocheck, before receiving a promotion to the second line wing with Trocheck and Mike Hoffman. Brassard dressed with the Panthers for only 10 games before being traded again, during which time he had one goal and three assists.

As part of a larger slew of trading deadline moves, on February 25, 2019, the Panthers traded Brassard to the Colorado Avalanche for a third-round pick in the 2020 NHL entry draft. Had Brassard re-signed with the Avalanche the following season, the Panthers would have also received a sixth-round pick in the 2020 draft. The day of the trade, the Panthers were already in Colorado to play the Avalanche at the Pepsi Center, and Brassard was pulled away during Florida's morning skate session to begin dressing for the other team. Although Brassard scored a goal against his former team that night, Colorado ultimately fell to Florida 4–3 in overtime. Brassard scored four goals in 20 games with Colorado, finishing the season with 14 goals and 23 points across the three teams for which he played. The Avalanche fell to the San Jose Sharks in the second round of the 2019 Stanley Cup playoffs, and Brassard, who missed three games of the first-round series against the Calgary Flames with an illness, was one of many depth forwards who did not score a goal during the Sharks–Avalanche series. Brassard became a free agent at the end of the season, which marked a change in his career trajectory. Whereas he had previously been a "big-money, coveted-by-the-market" player, he soon began signing shorter contracts later in the free agency period.

==== New York Islanders (2019–2020) ====
Brassard signed a one-year, $1.2 million deal with the New York Islanders on August 21, 2019. Wanting to avoid a repeat of the previous season, in which he had been traded twice and played for three separate teams, his contract included a no movement clause, which prevented New York from trading Brassard, placing him on waivers, or sending him to the AHL without his prior agreement. Islanders coach Barry Trotz shifted Brassard from his usual center position to the wing, with Brock Nelson centering the line and Anthony Beauvillier on the opposite wing. Under this new arrangement, Brassard settled into a scoring rhythm, and went on a five-game point streak in late October. He also served as a mentor to Beauvillier, a rookie and fellow Francophone. Trotz altered the lines as the season progressed, with Brassard and Josh Bailey each taking turns at center until the trading deadline, at which point the Islanders acquired Brassard's former Ottawa teammate Jean-Gabriel Pageau. Pageau and Brassard played only seven games together and had not found a permanent third linemate when the NHL announced the indefinite suspension of the 2019–20 season due to the COVID-19 pandemic. Brassard finished the curtailed regular season with 10 goals and 22 assists in 66 games. When the NHL returned to play for the 2020 Stanley Cup playoffs that August, Brassard joined the Islanders in Toronto, playing on a line with Pageau and Tom Kuhnhackl. Although the Islanders were eliminated from the postseason by the Tampa Bay Lightning in the Eastern Conference Final, Brassard recorded two goals and six assists in 18 playoff games.

==== Arizona Coyotes (2020–2021) ====
As the pandemic-delayed 2020–21 NHL season approached, Brassard signed a one-year contract with the Arizona Coyotes on December 30, 2020. He had taken an interest in Arizona while watching the team during the 2020 playoffs, while Coyotes general manager Bill Armstrong was looking for a veteran center to help a younger-skewing line-up. COVID-19 quarantine protocols caused Brassard to miss most of Arizona's training camp, but he was able to join the team for a scrimmage shortly before the start of the season. Head coach Rick Tocchet appointed Brassard as a temporary alternate captain at the start of the season, with the intention of re-evaluating his position after the first five games. Brassard ultimately carried the title through the 2020–21 season while filling a number of roles on the ice: he played both left wing and center and made appearances on every line besides the top. On March 20, Brassard helped snap a five-game Coyotes losing streak with a hat-trick in a 5–1 defeat of the Anaheim Ducks. It was his first regular-season hat-trick in 883 NHL games. Among active players at the time, only Valtteri Filppula, who had played in 1,038 games without a hat-trick, had a longer drought. The Coyotes failed to qualify for the 2021 Stanley Cup playoffs, having been mathematically eliminated from postseason contention at the start of May, but Brassard finished the season with eight goals and 20 points in 53 games.

==== Philadelphia Flyers (2021–2022) ====
On August 25, 2021, the Philadelphia Flyers signed Brassard to a one-year, $825,000 contract. Early in the season, he filled in for former Rangers teammate Kevin Hayes as a second-line center while Hayes recovered from abdominal surgery. The Flyers' 2021–22 season was mired in injury, particularly among centers, and Brassard left a November 23 game against the Tampa Bay Lightning early with a lower body injury. He reappeared for one game against the New Jersey Devils on December 8, but was still bothered by the injury and returned to the bench the following game. Although interim head coach Mike Yeo said that Brassard was "very close" to returning to play on December 26, he was placed on COVID-19 protocols the following day. He returned on January 6, in part because the Flyers were missing nine players due to COVID-19 protocols and other injuries and needed an extra body on the ice. Brassard aggravated the injury once more during the January 6 game and was sidelined for another month afterwards, only returning to the line-up in full on February 9. When he returned, he centered a third line that also featured James van Riemsdyk and Gerald Mayhew and also saw time on the second power play unit. Brassard scored his 200th career NHL goal on March 14, the only goal for the Flyers in their 3–1 loss to the Carolina Hurricanes. In 31 games with the Flyers, Brassard scored six goals and 16 points.

==== Edmonton Oilers (2022) ====
On March 21, 2022, the Flyers traded Brassard to the Edmonton Oilers in exchange for a fourth-round selection in the 2023 NHL entry draft. The Oilers were Brassard's 10th NHL team; in joining them, he became one of nine NHL players to appear for 10 or more teams. He made his debut with the Oilers on March 24, playing on a line with Ryan Nugent-Hopkins, and scored his first goal for the team that night against the San Jose Sharks. However, towards the end of the season, he saw more time as a healthy scratch and in the playoffs, only saw action in one playoff game, going scoreless.

==== Return to Ottawa (2022–2023) ====
After the 2021–22 season, Brassard was not re-signed by the Oilers. Brassard signed a professional try-out with the Ottawa Senators on September 15, 2022. After posting three points in four preseason games, Brassard was signed to a one-year contract with the Senators on October 10. Brassard played in his 1,000th NHL game, recording two goals in a 5–3 victory against his former team, the New York Rangers. He became the seventh player in NHL history to score multiple goals in his 1,000th game. On March 30 in a game against the Philadelphia Flyers, Brassard suffered a broken right fibula after getting tangled up with defenceman Rasmus Ristolainen and goaltender Felix Sandström in a tussle in front of the net. The injury sidelined him for the rest of the season after undergoing surgery.

On June 23, 2024, after a year out of hockey, Brassard announced his retirement.

==== Brief return and second retirement (2025–2026) ====
On December 10, 2025, Brassard came out of retirement and signed for Swiss club Genève-Servette HC of the National League. In his first game with Genève-Servette, Brassard suffered a lower-back injury, and was initially projected to be out for four weeks. Though he was healthy again in time for the National League playoffs, he ultimately did not play another game throughout the regular season and postseason. Following the season, on July 21, 2026, Brassard was hired as a player development assistant by the NHL's New York Rangers, ending his playing career for a second time.

== International play ==
Medal record

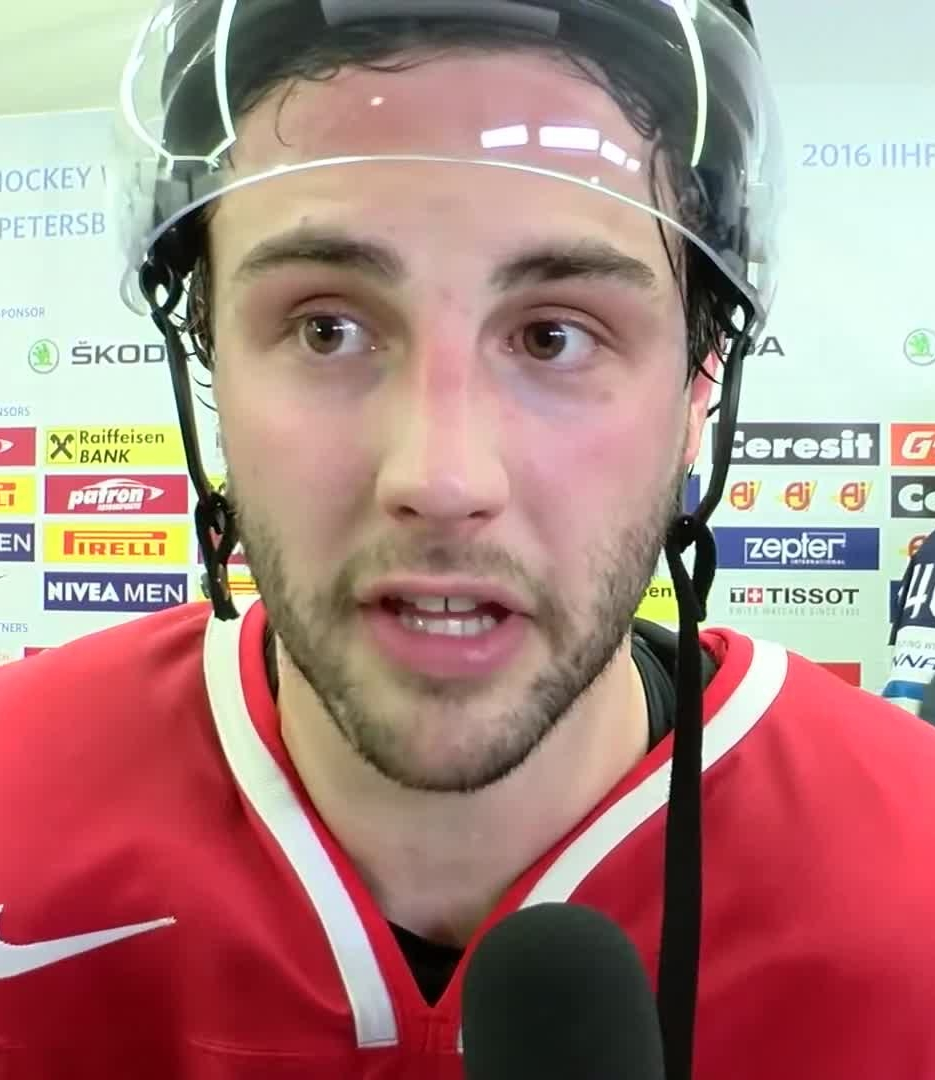
Representing Canada

Ice hockey

World Championships
Gold medal – first place	2016 Russia	

IIHF World U18 Championship
Silver medal – second place	2005 Czech Republic	

Representing Canada Quebec

World U-17 Hockey Challenge
Bronze medal – third place	2004 Canada	

Brassard has represented Team Canada at a number of international ice hockey tournaments, beginning with the 2004 World U-17 Hockey Challenge. Representing Quebec in the tournament, Brassard scored a preliminary-round goal against the United States team on a short-handed breakaway. That was the only point he recorded in six tournament games. Quebec ultimately faced the United States again in the bronze medal finals, defeating the team 3–2 to take a third-place tournament finish. The following April, he represented Canada at the 2005 IIHF World U18 Championships in the Czech Republic. Brassard and Canada took home the silver medal in the U18 tournament after losing 5–1 to the USA Hockey National Team Development Program team. Brassard recorded four points in the six-game contest, all assists.

Brassard had hoped to join the Canadian junior team for the 2006 World Junior Ice Hockey Championships in British Columbia, but despite a strong showing in training camp, he was one of the final players cut from the tournament team. Ten years after he was cut from the Canadian junior team, Brassard joined the Canada men's national ice hockey team for the 2016 IIHF World Championship in Russia. He led the Canadian team with five goals and 11 points in the tournament and won the gold medal.

== Personal life ==
Brassard's older sister Janie played college ice hockey for the Concordia Stingers before becoming a school teacher in Quebec. As a result of his Quebecois upbringing, Brassard is bilingual, speaking fluent French and English. In May 2020, Brassard became a minority owner of the Gatineau Olympiques QMJHL team.

Brassard maintains close friendships with fellow NHL players Cam Atkinson, Mats Zuccarello, Kevin Hayes, and Mark Stone, and he served as a groomsman at Atkinson's wedding. As of April 2022, Brassard is unmarried and does not have children, and he has told reporters that this allows him more flexibility in moving to different teams.

== Career statistics ==
=== Regular season and playoffs ===
			Regular season					Playoffs
Season	Team	League	GP	G	A	Pts	PIM	GP	G	A	Pts	PIM
2002–03	Gatineau L'Intrépide	QMAAA	42	7	33	40	38	—	—	—	—	—
2003–04	Gatineau L'Intrépide	QMAAA	32	19	45	64	84	—	—	—	—	—
2003–04	Drummondville Voltigeurs	QMJHL	10	0	1	1	0	7	0	0	0	0
2004–05	Drummondville Voltigeurs	QMJHL	69	25	51	76	25	6	1	5	6	6
2005–06	Drummondville Voltigeurs	QMJHL	58	44	72	116	92	7	5	4	9	10
2006–07	Drummondville Voltigeurs	QMJHL	14	6	19	25	24	12	9	15	24	12
2007–08	Syracuse Crunch	AHL	42	15	36	51	51	13	4	9	13	10
2007–08	Columbus Blue Jackets	NHL	17	1	1	2	6	—	—	—	—	—
2008–09	Columbus Blue Jackets	NHL	31	10	15	25	17	—	—	—	—	—
2009–10	Columbus Blue Jackets	NHL	79	9	27	36	48	—	—	—	—	—
2010–11	Columbus Blue Jackets	NHL	74	17	30	47	55	—	—	—	—	—
2011–12	Columbus Blue Jackets	NHL	74	14	27	41	42	—	—	—	—	—
2012–13	EC Red Bull Salzburg	EBEL	6	4	1	5	6	—	—	—	—	—
2012–13	Columbus Blue Jackets	NHL	34	7	11	18	16	—	—	—	—	—
2012–13	New York Rangers	NHL	13	5	6	11	0	12	2	10	12	2
2013–14	New York Rangers	NHL	81	18	27	45	46	23	6	6	12	8
2014–15	New York Rangers	NHL	80	19	41	60	34	19	9	7	16	20
2015–16	New York Rangers	NHL	80	27	31	58	30	5	1	3	4	0
2016–17	Ottawa Senators	NHL	81	14	25	39	24	19	4	7	11	8
2017–18	Ottawa Senators	NHL	58	18	20	38	30	—	—	—	—	—
2017–18	Pittsburgh Penguins	NHL	14	3	5	8	4	12	1	3	4	4
2018–19	Pittsburgh Penguins	NHL	40	9	6	15	29	—	—	—	—	—
2018–19	Florida Panthers	NHL	10	1	3	4	2	—	—	—	—	—
2018–19	Colorado Avalanche	NHL	20	4	0	4	8	9	0	1	1	8
2019–20	New York Islanders	NHL	66	10	22	32	16	18	2	6	8	6
2020–21	Arizona Coyotes	NHL	53	8	12	20	12	—	—	—	—	—
2021–22	Philadelphia Flyers	NHL	31	6	10	16	10	—	—	—	—	—
2021–22	Edmonton Oilers	NHL	15	2	1	3	6	1	0	0	0	0
2022–23	Ottawa Senators	NHL	62	13	10	23	30	—	—	—	—	—
2025–26	Genève-Servette HC	NL	1	0	0	0	0	—	—	—	—	—
NHL totals			1,013	215	330	545	465	118	25	43	68	56
NL totals			1	0	0	0	0	—	—	—	—	—

=== International ===
Year	Team	Event	Result	GP	G	A	Pts	PIM
2004	Canada Quebec	U17	3rd place, bronze medalist(s)	6	1	0	1	4
2005	Canada	WJC18	2nd place, silver medalist(s)	6	0	4	4	6
2016	Canada	WC	1st place, gold medalist(s)	10	5	6	11	4
Junior totals				12	1	4	5	10
Senior totals				10	5	6	11	4

== Awards and honours ==
Award	Year	Ref.
QMJHL
All-Rookie Team	2005	
Michel Bergeron Trophy	2005	
RDS Cup	2005	
CHL Canada/Russia Series participant	2006	
CHL/NHL Top Prospects Game	2006	
First All-Star Team	2006	
Michael Bossy Trophy	2006	
AHL
All-Star	2008	

Awards and achievements
Preceded by Gilbert Brule	Columbus Blue Jackets first-round draft pick 2006	Succeeded by Jakub Voracek
