= 1981–82 QMJHL season =

Canadian junior ice hockey season

The 1981–82 QMJHL season was the 13th season in the history of the Quebec Major Junior Hockey League. The defending Memorial Cup and league champions, the Cornwall Royals left the QMJHL in the offseason, transferring to the Ontario Hockey League.

The league was reduced to nine teams, and dissolved divisions. The remaining teams played a shortened schedule of 64 games each in the regular season. That was balanced by an extended first round playoff schedule. The top eight teams in the regular season participated in a double round-robin of 14 games per team, followed by playdowns.

The Sherbrooke Castors finished first overall in the regular season, winning the Jean Rougeau Trophy, and won their third President's Cup, defeating the Trois-Rivières Draveurs in the finals.

== Team changes ==
- The Cornwall Royals transfer to the Ontario Hockey League.
- The Sorel Éperviers relocate to Granby, Quebec, becoming the Granby Bisons.

== Final standings ==
Note: GP = Games played; W = Wins; L = Losses; T = Ties; Pts = Points; GF = Goals for; GA = Goals against

Overall	GP	W	L	T	Pts	GF	GA
Sherbrooke Castors	64	42	20	2	86	392	265
Hull Olympiques	64	41	21	2	84	343	260
Montreal Juniors	64	40	22	2	82	311	247
Trois-Rivières Draveurs	64	37	26	1	75	383	301
Shawinigan Cataractes	64	35	27	2	72	349	278
Chicoutimi Saguenéens	64	31	31	2	64	296	310
Laval Voisins	64	30	33	1	61	298	326
Granby Bisons	64	14	49	1	29	271	454
Quebec Remparts	64	11	52	1	23	192	394

- complete list of standings.

== Scoring leaders ==
Note: GP = Games played; G = Goals; A = Assists; Pts = Points; PIM = Penalties in minutes

Player	Team	GP	G	A	Pts	PIM
Claude Verret	Trois-Rivières Draveurs	64	54	108	162	14
Pierre Rioux	Shawinigan Cataractes	57	66	86	152	50
John Chabot	Sherbrooke Castors	62	34	109	143	40
Claude Drouin	Trois-Rivières Draveurs	62	48	82	130	51
Jacques Sylvestre	Granby Bisons	63	51	69	120	44
Norman Lefrancois	Trois-Rivières Draveurs	56	45	71	116	154
Luc Dufour	Chicoutimi Saguenéens	62	55	60	115	94
Jean Gauthier	Hull Olympiques	64	53	61	114	50
Eric Bernier	Chicoutimi Saguenéens	64	43	66	109	63
Pierre Sevigny	Trois-Rivières Draveurs	63	22	86	108	107
Daniel Campeau	Sherbrooke Castors	64	58	50	108	4

- complete scoring statistics

== Playoffs ==
Claude Verret was the leading scorer of the playoffs with 48 points (13 goals, 35 assists).

Round-robin standings

Note: GP = Games played; W = Wins; L = Losses; Pts = Points; GF = Goals for; GA = Goals against

Teams	GP	W	L	Pts	GF	GA
Laval Voisins	14	10	4	20	68	72
Sherbrooke Castors	14	9	5	18	79	57
Chicoutimi Saguenéens	14	9	5	18	73	65
Trois-Rivières Draveurs	14	8	6	16	65	66
Hull Olympiques	14	7	7	14	79	52
Shawinigan Cataractes	14	7	7	14	77	61
Montreal Juniors	14	5	9	10	46	61
Granby Bisons	14	1	13	2	53	106

Semifinals

- Sherbrooke Castors defeated Laval Voisins 4 games to 0.
- Trois-Rivières Draveurs defeated Chicoutimi Saguenéens 4 games to 2.

Finals

- Sherbrooke Castors defeated Trois-Rivières Draveurs 4 games to 0.

== All-star teams ==
First team

- Goaltender - Roberto Romano, Hull Olympiques
- Left defence - Paul-Andre Boutilier, Sherbrooke Castors
- Right defence - Michel Petit, Sherbrooke Castors
- Left winger - Luc Dufour, Chicoutimi Saguenéens
- Centreman - John Chabot, Sherbrooke Castors & Claude Verret, Trois-Rivières Draveurs
- Right winger - Pierre Rioux, Shawinigan Cataractes
- Coach - Jean Lachapelle, Hull Olympiques

Second team

- Goaltender - Mario Gosselin, Shawinigan Cataractes
- Left defence - Taras Zytynski, Montreal Juniors
- Right defence - Billy Campbell, Montreal Juniors
- Left winger - Normand Lefrancois, Trois-Rivières Draveurs
- Centreman - Jacques Sylvestre, Granby Bisons
- Right winger - Sean McKenna, Sherbrooke Castors
- Coach - Pierre Creamer, Montreal Juniors
- List of First/Second/Rookie team all-stars.

== Trophies and awards ==
Team

- President's Cup - Playoff Champions, Sherbrooke Castors
- Jean Rougeau Trophy - Regular Season Champions, Sherbrooke Castors
- Robert Lebel Trophy - Team with best GAA, Montreal Juniors

Player

- Michel Brière Memorial Trophy - Most Valuable Player, John Chabot, Sherbrooke Castors
- Jean Béliveau Trophy - Top Scorer, Claude Verret, Trois-Rivières Draveurs
- Guy Lafleur Trophy - Playoff MVP, Michel Morissette, Sherbrooke Castors
- Jacques Plante Memorial Trophy - Best GAA, Jeff Barratt, Montreal Juniors
- Emile Bouchard Trophy - Defenceman of the Year, Paul-Andre Boutilier, Sherbrooke Castors
- Mike Bossy Trophy - Best Pro Prospect, Michel Petit, Sherbrooke Castors
- Michel Bergeron Trophy - Offensive Rookie of the Year, Sylvain Turgeon, Hull Olympiques Draveurs
- Raymond Lagacé Trophy - Defensive Rookie of the Year, Michel Petit, Sherbrooke Castors
- Frank J. Selke Memorial Trophy - Most sportsmanlike player, Claude Verret, Trois-Rivières Draveurs
- Marcel Robert Trophy - Best Scholastic Player, Jacques Sylvestre, Granby Bisons

== See also ==
- 1982 Memorial Cup
- 1982 NHL entry draft
- 1981–82 OHL season
- 1981–82 WHL season

Preceded by 1980–81 QMJHL season	QMJHL seasons	Succeeded by 1982–83 QMJHL season
