= 1980–81 QMJHL season =

Canadian junior ice hockey season

The 1980–81 QMJHL season was the 12th season in the history of the Quebec Major Junior Hockey League. The league inaugurated three new trophies for players. The Marcel Robert Trophy is first awarded to the "Best Scholastic Player" and the Mike Bossy Trophy is first awarded to the "Best Professional Prospect" for the upcoming NHL entry draft. The league created a second Rookie of the Year award. The existing Michel Bergeron Trophy becomes the "Offensive" Rookie of the Year award, and the Raymond Lagacé Trophy is first awarded to the "Defensive" Rookie of the Year.

Ten teams played 72 games each in the schedule. The defending champion Cornwall Royals finished first overall in the regular season, winning the Jean Rougeau Trophy, and won their third, and second consecutive President's Cup, defeating the Trois-Rivières Draveurs in the finals. The Royals went on to win their third, and second consecutive Memorial Cup championship at the 1981 Memorial Cup tournament.

== Team changes ==
- The Sorel Éperviers remain in Sorel, Quebec after a mid-season move the previous season.

== Final standings ==
Note: GP = Games played; W = Wins; L = Losses; T = Ties; PTS = Points; GF = Goals for; GA = Goals against

Dilio Division	GP	W	L	T	Pts	GF	GA
Trois-Rivières Draveurs	72	42	27	3	87	365	346
Chicoutimi Saguenéens	72	41	30	1	83	389	364
Sherbrooke Castors	72	40	29	3	83	381	324
Shawinigan Cataractes	72	34	34	4	72	325	321
Quebec Remparts	72	31	39	2	64	316	337

Lebel Division	GP	W	L	T	Pts	GF	GA
Cornwall Royals	72	44	26	2	90	403	311
Sorel Éperviers	72	36	30	6	78	333	303
Montreal Juniors	72	35	37	0	70	316	328
Hull Olympiques	72	23	46	3	49	262	353
Laval Voisins	72	21	49	2	44	293	396

- complete list of standings.

== Scoring leaders ==
Note: GP = Games played; G = Goals; A = Assists; Pts = Points; PIM = Penalties in minutes

Player	Team	GP	G	A	Pts	PIM
Dale Hawerchuk	Cornwall Royals	72	81	102	183	69
Alain Lemieux	Chicoutimi /Trois-Rivières	70	68	98	166	64
Chris Valentine	Sorel Éperviers	72	65	77	142	176
Daniel Rioux	Quebec Remparts	69	53	77	130	16
Andre Cote	Sorel / Québec	72	66	63	129	12
Francois Lecompte	Montreal Juniors	63	45	83	128	87
Scott Arniel	Cornwall Royals	68	52	71	123	102
Guy Fournier	Shawinigan Cataractes	68	56	62	118	64
Tim Cranston	Shawinigan Cataractes	72	46	67	113	123
Claude Verret	Trois-Rivières Draveurs	68	39	73	112	4
Norman Lefrancois	Trois-Rivières Draveurs	69	52	60	112	124

- complete scoring statistics

== Playoffs ==
Alain Lemieux was the leading scorer of the playoffs with 49 points (18 goals, 31 assists).

Quarterfinals

- Cornwall Royals defeated Quebec Remparts 4 games to 3.
- Trois-Rivières Draveurs defeated Montreal Juniors 4 games to 3.
- Chicoutimi Saguenéens defeated Shawinigan Cataractes 4 games to 1.
- Sherbrooke Castors defeated Sorel Éperviers 4 games to 3.

Semifinals

- Cornwall Royals defeated Sherbrooke Castors 4 games to 3.
- Trois-Rivières Draveurs defeated Chicoutimi Saguenéens 4 games to 3.

Finals

- Cornwall Royals defeated Trois-Rivières Draveurs 4 games to 1.

== All-star teams ==
First team

- Goaltender - Corrado Micalef, Sherbrooke Castors
- Left defence - Pierre Sevigny, Trois-Rivières Draveurs
- Right defence - Fred Boimistruck, Cornwall Royals
- Left winger - Normand Lefrancois, Trois-Rivières Draveurs
- Centreman - Dale Hawerchuk, Cornwall Royals
- Right winger - Sean McKenna, Sherbrooke Castors
- Coach - Andre Boisvert, Sherbrooke Castors

Second team

- Goaltender - Michel Dufor, Sorel Éperviers
- Left defence - Robert Savard, Cornwall Royals
- Right defence - Gilbert Delorme, Chicoutimi Saguenéens
- Left winger - Normand Leveille, Chicoutimi Saguenéens
- Centreman - Alain Lemieux, Trois-Rivières Draveurs
- Right winger - Jean-Marc Gaulin, Sorel Éperviers
- Coach - Bob Kilger, Cornwall Royals
- List of First/Second/Rookie team all-stars.

== Trophies and awards ==
Team

- President's Cup - Playoff Champions, Cornwall Royals
- Jean Rougeau Trophy - Regular Season Champions, Cornwall Royals
- Robert Lebel Trophy - Team with best GAA, Sorel Éperviers

Player

- Michel Brière Memorial Trophy - Most Valuable Player, Dale Hawerchuk, Cornwall Royals
- Jean Béliveau Trophy - Top Scorer, Dale Hawerchuk, Cornwall Royals
- Guy Lafleur Trophy - Playoff MVP, Alain Lemieux, Trois-Rivières Draveurs
- Jacques Plante Memorial Trophy - Best GAA, Michel Dufour, Sorel Éperviers
- Emile Bouchard Trophy - Defenceman of the Year, Fred Boimistruck, Cornwall Royals
- Mike Bossy Trophy - Best Pro Prospect, Dale Hawerchuk, Cornwall Royals
- Michel Bergeron Trophy - Offensive Rookie of the Year, Claude Verret, Trois-Rivières Draveurs
- Raymond Lagacé Trophy - Defensive Rookie of the Year, Billy Campbell, Montreal Juniors
- Frank J. Selke Memorial Trophy - Most sportsmanlike player, Claude Verret, Trois-Rivières Draveurs
- Marcel Robert Trophy - Best Scholastic Player, Francois Lecomte, Montreal Juniors

== See also ==
- 1981 Memorial Cup
- 1981 NHL entry draft
- 1980–81 OHL season
- 1980–81 WHL season

Preceded by 1979–80 QMJHL season	QMJHL seasons	Succeeded by 1981–82 QMJHL season
