= Jean-Marc Gaulin =

Canadian ice hockey right winger

- Born: March 3, 1962 (age 63) Balve, West Germany
- Height: 5 ft 10 in (178 cm)
- Weight: 180 lb (82 kg; 12 st 12 lb)
- Position: Right wing
- Shot: Right
- Played for: Quebec Nordiques; Mont-Blanc HC; Briançon; Français Volants
- NHL draft: 53rd overall, 1981; Quebec Nordiques
- Playing career: 1982–1996

Jean-Marc Gaulin (born March 3, 1962) is a German-born Canadian former professional ice hockey player who played 26 games in the National Hockey League with the Quebec Nordiques between 1983 and 1986. The rest of his career, which lasted from 1982 to 1996, was spent in the minor leagues and then in France. He was born in Balve, West Germany, but grew up in Trois-Rivières, Quebec.

== Career statistics ==
=== Regular season and playoffs ===
			Regular season					Playoffs
Season	Team	League	GP	G	A	Pts	PIM	GP	G	A	Pts	PIM
1978–79	Sherbrooke Castors	QMJHL	71	26	41	67	89	12	2	9	11	22
1979–80	Sherbrooke Castors	QMJHL	16	6	15	21	14	—	—	—	—	—
1979–80	Verdun/Sorel Éperviers	QMJHL	43	15	25	40	105	—	—	—	—	—
1980–81	Sorel Éperviers	QMJHL	70	50	40	90	157	7	0	3	3	6
1981–82	Hull Olympiques	QMJHL	56	50	50	100	93	11	2	15	17	9
1982–83	Quebec Nordiques	NHL	1	0	0	0	0	—	—	—	—	—
1982–83	Fredericton Express	AHL	67	11	17	28	58	9	0	0	0	21
1983–84	Quebec Nordiques	NHL	2	0	0	0	0	—	—	—	—	—
1983–84	Fredericton Express	AHL	62	14	28	42	80	7	2	5	7	0
1984–85	Quebec Nordiques	NHL	22	3	3	6	8	1	0	0	0	0
1984–85	Fredericton Express	AHL	27	10	9	19	32	5	1	3	4	2
1985–86	Quebec Nordiques	NHL	1	1	0	1	0	—	—	—	—	—
1985–86	Fredericton Express	AHL	58	16	26	42	66	6	2	3	5	31
1986–87	Fredericton Express	AHL	17	1	1	2	15	—	—	—	—	—
1986–87	Muskegon Lumberjacks	IHL	5	1	3	4	6	—	—	—	—	—
1987–88	Mont-Blanc HC	FRA	23	19	17	36	26	—	—	—	—	—
1988–89	Français Volants	FRA	43	44	32	76	20	—	—	—	—	—
1989–90	Français Volants	FRA	39	41	29	70	22	—	—	—	—	—
1990–91	Français Volants	FRA	28	21	18	39	16	4	4	1	5	6
1991–92	Briançon	FRA	33	38	28	66	32	—	—	—	—	—
1992–93	Lausanne HC	NLB	10	8	6	14	6	—	—	—	—	—
1993–94	CP Lyon	FRA-3	26	40	28	63	42	—	—	—	—	—
1994–95	CP Lyon	FRA-2	28	27	19	46	30	—	—	—	—	—
1995–96	CP Lyon	FRA-2	27	22	19	41	34	—	—	—	—	—
FRA totals			166	163	124	287	116	4	4	1	5	6
NHL totals			26	4	3	7	8	1	0	0	0	0

=== International ===
Year	Team	Event	GP	G	A	Pts	PIM
1981	Canada	WJC	5	2	0	2	4
Junior totals			5	2	0	2	4
