= CHL/NHL Top Prospects Game =

Annual Canadian Hockey League event

- Country: Canada
- Inaugurated: 1992
- Most recent: 2024
- Major events: Ice hockey
- Organiser: Canadian Hockey League
- Sponsors: Kubota (2020-2024); Sherwin-Williams (2017–2019); Bank of Montreal (2014–2016); Home Hardware (2000–2013)
- Website: kubotatopprospects.ca

The CHL/NHL Top Prospects Game was an annual event in which forty of the top National Hockey League (NHL) entry draft eligible prospects in the Canadian Hockey League (CHL) played against each other in an all-star game environment. Players were able to boost their draft ranking with the NHL scouts and general managers attending. Each team was led by a celebrity coach, usually Don Cherry and Bobby Orr.

From 1992 to 1995 the event was known as the CHL All–Star Challenge, between the three CHL constituent leagues–the Western Hockey League (WHL), the Ontario Hockey League (OHL), and the Quebec Maritimes Junior Hockey League (QMJHL). In 1996, the CHL partnered with the NHL to create the CHL/NHL Top Prospects Game. Teams were led by a celebrity coach, with Don Cherry and Bobby Orr having been frequent coaches. Home Hardware became the corporate title sponsor starting in 2000, followed by Bank of Montreal (BMO) in 2014, Sherwin-Williams in 2017, and Kubota in 2020.

The last Top Prospects Game was held in 2024. For the 2024–25 season, a new event, the CHL USA Prospects Challenge, was inaugurated.

== 1992 CHL All–Star Challenge ==
The inaugural CHL All–Star Challenge featured the host Western Hockey League team, versus and a combined team from the Ontario Hockey League and the Quebec Major Junior Hockey League. John Spoltore of the North Bay Centennials scored twice for the East, and Dean McAmmond of the Prince Albert Raiders scored the winning goal in overtime for the West.

1992 CHL All–Star Challenge
Date	February 4, 1992	
Location	Saskatchewan Place (Saskatoon, Saskatchewan)	
Game report	Home	Away
Team	West (WHL)	East (OHL/QMJHL)
Coaches	Mike Fedorko; Bryan Maxwell	Jos Canale; Ted Nolan
Player of the game	Richard Matvichuk	Fred Brathwaite
Score (OT)	5	4

== 1993 CHL All–Star Challenge ==
In the second CHL All–Star Challenge, the Quebec Major Junior Hockey League hosted a combined team from the Western Hockey League and the Ontario Hockey League. Claude Savoie of the Victoriaville Tigres, and Martin Gendron of the Saint-Hyacinthe Laser, both scored twice for the QMJHL, but the WHL/OHL scored five goals in the third period to win the game.

1993 CHL All–Star Challenge
Date	January 19, 1993	
Location	Montreal Forum (Montreal, Quebec)	
Attendance	4,355	
Game report	Home	Away
Team	QMJHL	OHL/WHL
Coaches	Pierre Aubry	Ted Nolan; Bob Lowes
Player of the game	Alexandre Daigle	Jeff Shantz
Score	5	7

== 1994 CHL All–Star Challenge ==
In the third CHL All–Star Challenge, the Quebec Major Junior Hockey League hosted a combined team from the Western Hockey League and the Ontario Hockey League. Sixteen goals were scored by fifteen different players, with Jeff Shevalier of the North Bay Centennials, scoring twice. Quebec led 4–2 after the first period, but were outscored 4–1 by the OHL/WHL in the third period.

1994 CHL All–Star Challenge
Date	February 1, 1994	
Location	Moncton Coliseum (Moncton, New Brunswick)	
Attendance	6,380	
Game report	Home	Away
Team	QMJHL/Atlantic	OHL/WHL
Coaches	Guy Chouinard; Michel Therrien	Ted Nolan; Brent Peterson
Player of the game	Samuel Groleau; Jason MacDonald	Jeff Shevalier
Score	7	9

== 1995 CHL All–Star Challenge ==
The fourth CHL All–Star Challenge was hosted by the Ontario Hockey League, versus a combined team from the Quebec Major Junior Hockey League and the Western Hockey League. The QMJHL/WHL scored the first five goals of the game, and won 8–3, led by two goals each from Eric Daze of the Beauport Harfangs, and Terry Ryan of the Tri-City Americans.

1995 CHL All–Star Challenge
Date	January 31, 1995	
Location	Kitchener Memorial Auditorium (Kitchener, Ontario)	
Attendance	5,679	
Game report	Home	Away
Team	OHL	QMJHL/WHL
Coaches	Paul Maurice	Don Hay; Jos Canale
Player of the game	Todd Bertuzzi	Sébastien Bordeleau
Score	3	8

== 1996 CHL/NHL Top Prospects Game ==
The first CHL/NHL Top Prospects Game in 1996, was coached by celebrities Don Cherry and Bobby Orr, joined by assistants, Brian Kilrea, Blair Machasey, and Bob Loucks. Team Cherry won 9–3, led by Lance Ward of the Red Deer Rebels, and Jean-Pierre Dumont of the Val-d'Or Foreurs scoring two goals each.

1996 CHL/NHL Top Prospects Game
Date	February 15, 1996, 7:00 pm	
Location	Maple Leaf Gardens (Toronto, Ontario)	
Attendance	10,158	
Game report	Home	Away
Team	Team Cherry	Team Orr
Coach	Don Cherry	Bobby Orr
Player of the game	Trevor Wasyluk	Luke Curtin
Score	9	3

== 1997 CHL/NHL Top Prospects Game ==
Cherry and Orr continued as coaches for the 1997 CHL/NHL Top Prospects Game. Brian Kilrea and Bert O'Brien of the Ottawa 67's joined Cherry as assistants. Orr was joined by Michel Therrien of the Granby Prédateurs, and Todd McLellan of the Swift Current Broncos. Team Orr led 4–0 after the first period, and won 7–2. Goaltender Roberto Luongo of the Val-d'Or Foreurs, made 29 saves in the victory. Jeff Zehr of the Windsor Spitfires, and Daniel Cleary of the Belleville Bulls scored two goals each.

1997 CHL/NHL Top Prospects Game
Date	February 12, 1997, 7:00 pm	
Location	Maple Leaf Gardens (Toronto, Ontario)	
Attendance	11,627	
Game report	Home	Away
Team	Team Orr	Team Cherry
Coach	Bobby Orr	Don Cherry
Player of the game	Roberto Luongo	Daniel Cleary
Score	7	2

== 1998 CHL/NHL Top Prospects Game ==
Cherry and Orr continued as coaches for the 1998 CHL/NHL Top Prospects Game. Brian Kilrea returned as an assistant coach to Cherry, and Claude Julien of the Hull Olympiques, and Brent Peterson of the Portland Winter Hawks, joined Orr. Team Cherry lead 3–0 halfway through the game, and held on for a 4–2 win. Six different players scored one goal each, and goaltender Philippe Sauvé of the Rimouski Océanic stopped all 23 shots he faced.

1998 CHL/NHL Top Prospects Game
Date	February 10, 1998, 7:00 pm	
Location	Maple Leaf Gardens (Toronto, Ontario)	
Attendance	11,088	
Game report	Home	Away
Team	Team Cherry	Team Orr
Coach	Don Cherry	Bobby Orr
Player of the game	Jonathan Cheechoo	Michael Henrich
Score	4	2

== 1999 CHL/NHL Top Prospects Game ==
Cherry and Orr continued as coaches for the 1999 CHL/NHL Top Prospects Game. Lanny McDonald and Brian Kilrea were assistant coaches to Cherry, and Dean Clark of the Calgary Hitmen, and Gaston Therrien of the Val-d'Or Foreurs, joined Orr. Team Cherry outshot Team Orr 42–25, but Team Orr won 4–3.

1999 CHL/NHL Top Prospects Game
Date	February 16, 1999, 7:00 pm	
Location	Canadian Airlines Saddledome (Calgary, Alberta)	
Attendance	14,100	
Game report	Home	Away
Team	Team Orr	Team Cherry
Coach	Bobby Orr	Don Cherry
Player of the game	Chris Kelly; Maxime Ouellet	Kris Beech
Score	4	3

== 2000 Home Hardware Top Prospects Game ==
Home Hardware was the title sponsor of the CHL/NHL Top Prospects Game from 2000 to 2013.

The CHL announced Home Hardware as the corporate title sponsor of the event, starting in 2000. Cherry and Orr continued as coaches for the 2000 Home Hardware Top Prospects Game. Brian Kilrea returned as an assistant coach to Cherry, and Dean Clark returned with Orr. Team Orr scored three goals in the third period, and won 6–3. Nathan Smith of the Swift Current Broncos scored twice for Team Orr, and Gerard Dicaire of the Seattle Thunderbirds scored two points for Team Cherry.

2000 Home Hardware Top Prospects Game
Date	February 2, 2000, 7:00 pm	
Location	Air Canada Centre (Toronto, Ontario)	
Attendance	10,356	
Game report	Home	Away
Team	Team Cherry	Team Orr
Coach	Don Cherry	Bobby Orr
Player of the game	Steve Ott	Nathan Smith
Score	3	6

== 2001 Home Hardware Top Prospects Game ==
Cherry and Orr continued as coaches for the 2001 Home Hardware Top Prospects Game. Lanny McDonald and Brian Kilrea were assistant coaches to Cherry, and Brent Sutter of the Red Deer Rebels, and Doris Labonté of the Rimouski Océanic, joined Orr. Greg Watson of the Prince Albert Raiders scored two goals and two assists, to lead Team Orr to a 5–3 victory.

2001 Home Hardware Top Prospects Game
Date	February 7, 2001, 7:00 pm	
Location	Pengrowth Saddledome (Calgary, Alberta)	
Attendance	8,855	
Game report	Home	Away
Team	Team Orr	Team Cherry
Coach	Bobby Orr	Don Cherry
Player of the game	Greg Watson	Derek Roy
Score	5	3

== 2002 Home Hardware Top Prospects Game ==
For the 2002 Home Hardware Top Prospects Game, the CHL announced Tiger Williams and Kelly Hrudey as the new celebrity coaches for the event. Bob Lowes of the Regina Pats, joined Williams and as assistant coach, and Kevin Dickie of the Saskatoon Blades, joined Hrudey. Pierre-Marc Bouchard of the Chicoutimi Saguenéens, and Joffrey Lupul of the Medicine Hat Tigers, both scored two goals. Petr Taticek of the Sault Ste. Marie Greyhounds scored a penalty shot goal as part of Team Tiger's four goals in the second period, in a 7–4 victory by Team Tiger.

2002 Home Hardware Top Prospects Game
Date	January 31, 2002, 7:00 pm	
Location	Saskatchewan Place (Saskatoon, Saskatchewan)	
Attendance	10,078	
Game report	Home	Away
Team	Team Hrudey	Team Tiger
Coach	Kelly Hrudey	Tiger Williams
Player of the game	Joffrey Lupul	Jay Bouwmeester
Score	4	7

== 2003 Home Hardware Top Prospects Game ==
Cherry and Orr returned as coaches for the 2003 Home Hardware Top Prospects Game. Brian Kilrea returned as an assistant coach to Cherry, and Peter DeBoer of the Kitchener Rangers, joined Orr. Frank Rediker of the Windsor Spitfires, had a goal and an assist for Team Cherry, and Mike Richards of the Kitchener Rangers, had two assists, for Team Orr. Team Cherry scored three goals in the third period to win 4–3.

2003 Home Hardware Top Prospects Game
Date	January 22, 2003, 7:00 pm	
Location	Kitchener Memorial Auditorium (Kitchener, Ontario)	
Attendance	5,766	
Game report	Home	Away
Team	Team Cherry	Team Orr
Coach	Don Cherry	Bobby Orr
Player of the game	Dan Fritsche	Paul Bissonnette
Score	4	3

== 2004 Home Hardware Top Prospects Game ==
Cherry and Orr continued as coaches for the 2004 Home Hardware Top Prospects Game. Dale Hunter and Jacques Beaulieu of the London Knights, were assistant coaches to Cherry, and Brian Kilrea and Bert O'Brien of the Ottawa 67's, joined Orr. Team Orr scored the first three and last three goals to win 6–2. Blake Comeau of the Kelowna Rockets, scored four points, and Rob Schremp of the London Knights scored three points for Team Orr.

2004 Home Hardware Top Prospects Game
Date	January 21, 2004, 7:00 pm	
Location	John Labatt Centre (London, Ontario)	
Attendance	8,835	
Game report	Home	Away
Team	Team Orr	Team Cherry
Coach	Bobby Orr	Don Cherry
Player of the game	Rob Schremp	Wojtek Wolski
Score	6	2

== 2005 Home Hardware Top Prospects Game ==
Cherry continued as a coach for the 2005 Home Hardware Top Prospects Game. Orr was replaced by John Davidson as coach. Kenndal McArdle of the Moose Jaw Warriors scored two goals for Team Davidson. Gilbert Brulé of the Vancouver Giants scored two goals, leading Team Cherry to an 8–4 win.

2005 Home Hardware Top Prospects Game
Date	January 19, 2005, 7:00 pm	
Location	Pacific Coliseum (Vancouver, British Columbia)	
Attendance	16,331	
Game report	Home	Away
Team	Team Cherry	Team Davidson
Coach	Don Cherry	John Davidson
Player of the game	Gilbert Brulé	Kenndal McArdle
Score	8	4

== 2006 Home Hardware Top Prospects Game ==
Cherry and Orr reunited as coaches for the 2006 Home Hardware Top Prospects Game. Team Cherry scored the first goals of the game, on assists from Ty Wishart of the Prince George Cougars. Team Orr scored seven unanswered goals to win the game. Bryan Little of the Barrie Colts scored twice to lead the way.

2006 Home Hardware Top Prospects Game
Date	January 18, 2006, 7:00 pm	
Location	Scotiabank Place (Ottawa, Ontario)	
Attendance	13,735	
Game report	Home	Away
Team	Team Orr	Team Cherry
Coach	Bobby Orr	Don Cherry
Player of the game	Bryan Little; Codey Burki	NONE
Score	7	2

== 2007 Home Hardware Top Prospects Game ==
For the 2007 Home Hardware Top Prospects Game, the CHL announced new celebrity coaches for the event. Scotty Bowman and Jacques Demers teamed up with Patrick Roy of the Quebec Remparts, to coach the white team. Pat Burns and Michel Bergeron teamed up with Benoit Groulx of the Gatineau Olympiques, to coach the red team. Oscar Moller of the Chilliwack Bruins, scored a goal and an assists for the white team. Ruslan Bashkirov of the Quebec Remparts, scored twice for the red team, leading to a 5–3 victory.

2007 Home Hardware Top Prospects Game
Date	January 17, 2007, 7:00 pm	
Location	Colisée Pepsi (Quebec City, Quebec)	
Attendance	7,762	
Game report	Home	Away
Team	Team White	Team Red
Coaches	Patrick Roy; Scotty Bowman; Jacques Demers	Benoit Groulx; Pat Burns; Michel Bergeron
Player of the game	Oscar Moller	Ruslan Bashkirov
Score	3	5

== 2008 Home Hardware Top Prospects Game ==
For the 2008 Home Hardware Top Prospects Game, the CHL announced new celebrity coaches for the event. Grant Fuhr and Glenn Anderson teamed up with Don Nachbaur of the Tri-City Americans, to coach the white team. Lanny McDonald and Mike Vernon teamed up with Kelly Kisio of the Calgary Hitmen, to coach the red team. Josh Bailey of the Windsor Spitfires, scored twice, and Cody Hodgson of the Brampton Battalion, added three assists, to help team white win 8–4.

2008 Home Hardware Top Prospects Game
Date	January 23, 2008, 7:00 pm	
Location	Rexall Place (Edmonton, Alberta)	
Attendance	13,596	
Game report	Home	Away
Team	Team Red	Team White
Coaches	Kelly Kisio; Lanny McDonald; Mike Vernon	Don Nachbaur; Grant Fuhr; Glenn Anderson
Player of the game	Steven Stamkos	Zach Boychuk
Score	4	8

== 2009 Home Hardware Top Prospects Game ==
Cherry and Orr reunited as coaches for the 2009 Home Hardware Top Prospects Game. Team Orr won 6–1, let by two goals each from Cody Eakin of the Swift Current Broncos, and David Gilbert of the Quebec Remparts.

2009 Home Hardware Top Prospects Game
Date	January 14, 2009, 7:00 pm	
Location	General Motors Centre (Oshawa, Ontario)	
Attendance	5,510	
Game report	Home	Away
Team	Team Orr	Team Cherry
Coach	Bobby Orr	Don Cherry
Player of the game	Cody Eakin	Edward Pasquale
Score	6	1

== 2010 Home Hardware Top Prospects Game ==
Cherry returned as coach for the 2010 Home Hardware Top Prospects Game, with Brian Kilrea and Bert O'Brien as assistants. Team Orr was coached by Jody Hull of the Peterborough Petes, and Marty Williamson of the Niagara IceDogs. Team Cherry scored three times in the third period to win the game. Players of the game were Taylor Hall of the Windsor Spitfires, and Jeff Skinner of the Kitchener Rangers.

2010 Home Hardware Top Prospects Game
Date	January 20, 2010, 7:00 pm	
Location	WFCU Centre (Windsor, Ontario)	
Attendance	6,193	
Game report	Home	Away
Team	Team Cherry	Team Orr
Coach	Don Cherry	Bobby Orr
Player of the game	Taylor Hall	Jeff Skinner
Score	4	2

== 2011 Home Hardware Top Prospects Game ==
Cherry returned as coach for the 2011 Home Hardware Top Prospects Game, with Brian Kilrea and Bert O'Brien as assistants. Team Orr was coached by Wendel Clark, Doug Gilmour of the Kingston Frontenacs, and Stan Butler of the Brampton Battalion. Team Orr scored four times on way to a 7–1 victory. Zack Phillips of the Saint John Sea Dogs, led all scorers with three points.

2011 Home Hardware Top Prospects Game
Date	January 19, 2011, 7:00 pm	
Location	Air Canada Centre (Toronto, Ontario)	
Attendance	8,029	
Game report	Home	Away
Team	Team Orr	Team Cherry
Coach	Bobby Orr	Don Cherry
Player of the game	Ryan Nugent-Hopkins	Ryan Murphy
Score	7	1

== 2012 Home Hardware Top Prospects Game ==
For the 2012 Home Hardware Top Prospects Game, Team Cherry was coached by Mark Recchi, and assistant Ryan Huska of the Kelowna Rockets. Team Orr was coached by Pat Quinn, and assistant Don Hay of the Vancouver Giants. Players of the game were Branden Troock of the Seattle Thunderbirds, and goaltender Matt Murray of the Sault Ste. Marie Greyhounds.

2012 Home Hardware Top Prospects Game
Date	February 1, 2012, 7:00 pm	
Location	Prospera Place (Kelowna, British Columbia)	
Attendance	5,022	
Game report	Home	Away
Team	Team Orr	Team Cherry
Coach	Bobby Orr	Don Cherry
Player of the game	Branden Troock	Matt Murray
Score	2	1

== 2013 Home Hardware Top Prospects Game ==
Don Cherry returned as a coach, and Team Orr was coached by Mike McPhee. Team Orr outshot Team Cherry 36–20, and won 3–0. Players of the game were Tristan Jarry of the Edmonton Oil Kings, and Laurent Dauphin of the Chicoutimi Saguenéens.

2013 Home Hardware Top Prospects Game
Date	January 16, 2013, 7:00 pm	
Location	Halifax Metro Centre (Halifax, Nova Scotia)	
Attendance	10,595	
Game report	Home	Away
Team	Team Cherry	Team Orr
Coach	Don Cherry	Bobby Orr
Player of the game	Tristan Jarry	Laurent Dauphin
Score	0	3

== 2014 BMO Top Prospects Game ==
Bank of Montreal was the title sponsor of the CHL/NHL Top Prospects Game from 2014 to 2016.

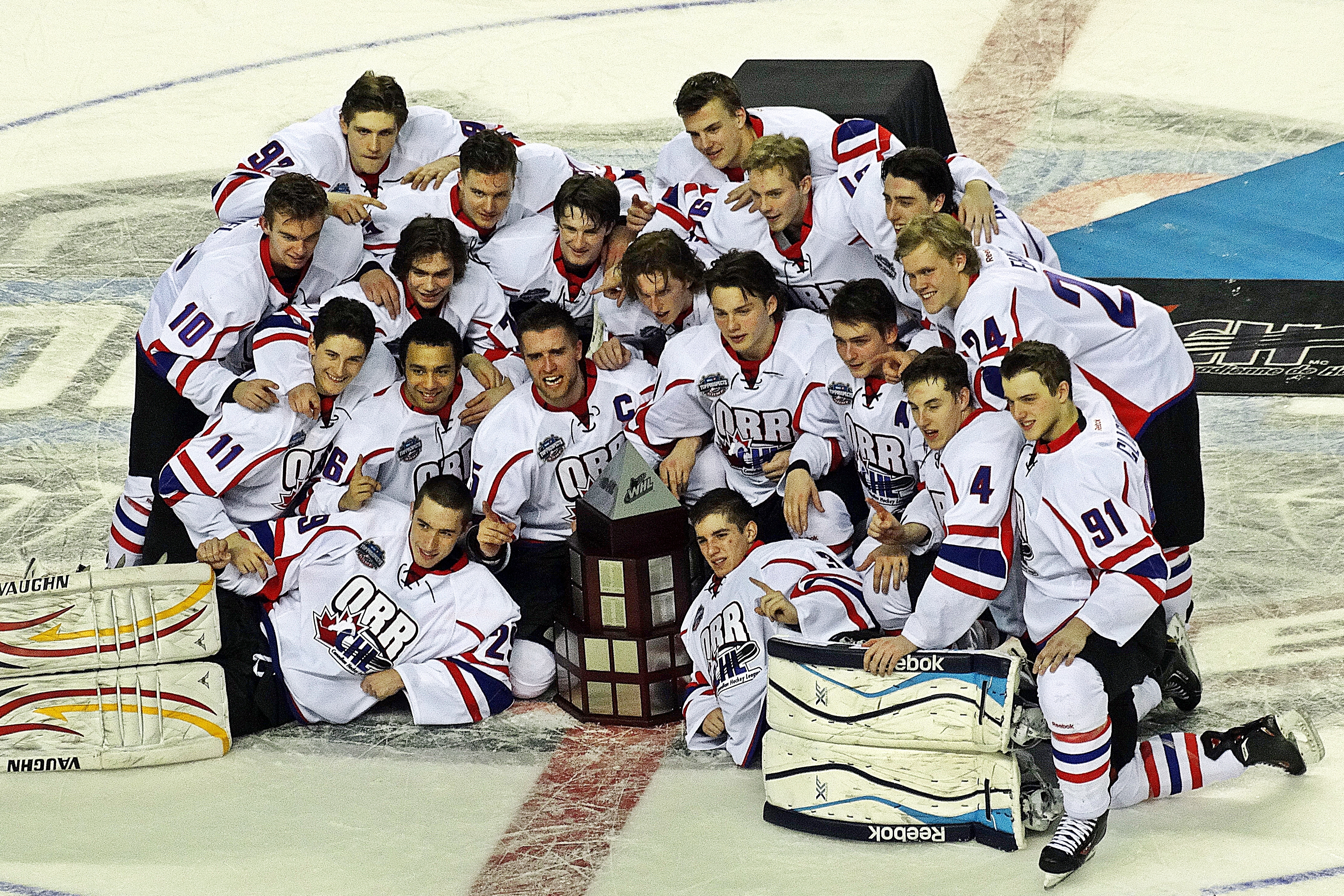
Team Orr celebrates their victory in the 2014 game

The CHL announced Bank of Montreal (BMO) as the corporate title sponsor of the event, starting in 2014, and several Calgary Flames celebrities to coach the 2014 BMO Top Prospects Game. Team Cherry was led by Jim Peplinski and Paul Reinhart, joined by broadcaster Nick Kypreos, and the general manager of the London Knights, Mark Hunter. Team Orr was led by Tim Hunter, Joel Otto, Mike Vernon, and former NHL coach, Doug MacLean. Team Orr scored three times in the second period, and won 4–3. Players of the game were Nikolay Goldobin of the Sarnia Sting, and Jared McCann of the Sault Ste. Marie Greyhounds.

2014 BMO Top Prospects Game
Date	January 15, 2014, 7:00 pm	
Location	Scotiabank Saddledome (Calgary, Alberta)	
Attendance	11,631	
Game report	Home	Away
Team	Team Orr	Team Cherry
Coach	Tim Hunter	Jim Peplinski
Player of the game	Jared McCann	Nikolay Goldobin
Score	4	3

== 2015 BMO Top Prospects Game ==
Cherry and Orr both returned as coaches for the 2015 BMO Top Prospects Game. Brian Kilrea and Bert O'Brien assisted Cherry, and Orr was joined by Niagara IceDogs' coaches Billy Burke and David Bell. Travis Konecny of the Ottawa 67's, and Timo Meier of the Halifax Mooseheads, both scored three points, leading Team Orr to a 6–0 victory.

2015 BMO Top Prospects Game
Date	January 22, 2015, 7:00 pm	
Location	Meridian Centre (St. Catharines, Ontario)	
Attendance	5,300	
Game report	Home	Away
Team	Team Orr	Team Cherry
Coach	Bobby Orr	Don Cherry
Player of the game	Travis Konecny	Dylan Strome
Score	6	0

== 2016 BMO Top Prospects Game ==
Cherry and Orr returned as coaches for the 2016 BMO Top Prospects Game. Brian Kilrea and Bert O'Brien returned as assistants to Cherry, and Glen Hanlon and Todd Warriner joined Orr. Team Orr was led to victory by three points each from Pascal Laberge of the Victoriaville Tigres, and Pierre-Luc Dubois of the Cape Breton Screaming Eagles.

2016 BMO Top Prospects Game
Date	January 28, 2016, 6:00 pm	
Location	Pacific Coliseum (Vancouver, British Columbia)	
Attendance	10,113	
Game report	Home	Away
Team	Team Orr	Team Cherry
Coach	Bobby Orr	Don Cherry
Player of the game	Pascal Laberge	Michael McLeod
Score	3	2

== 2017 Sherwin-Williams Top Prospects Game ==
Sherwin-Williams was the title sponsor of the CHL/NHL Top Prospects Game from 2017 to 2019.

The CHL announced Sherwin-Williams as the corporate title sponsor of the event, starting in 2017. The 2017 Sherwin-Williams Top Prospects Game featured four celebrity coaches, all of whom played junior hockey for the Quebec Remparts. Team Cherry was led by Simon Gagné and Pierre Lacroix, and the head coach of the Quebec Remparts, Philippe Boucher. Team Orr was led by Guy Chouinard and Dave Pichette, and the head coach of the Drummondville Voltigeurs, Dominique Ducharme. Team Cherry scored three times on the power play, and won 7–5. Players of the game were Henri Jokiharju of the Portland Winterhawks, and Nico Hischier of the Halifax Mooseheads.

2017 Sherwin-Williams Top Prospects Game
Date	January 30, 2017, 7:00 pm	
Location	Centre Vidéotron (Quebec City, Quebec)	
Attendance	9,707	
Game report	Home	Away
Team	Team Cherry	Team Orr
Coach	Don Cherry	Bobby Orr
Player of the game	Henri Jokiharju	Nico Hischier
Score	7	5

== 2018 Sherwin-Williams Top Prospects Game ==
Don Cherry returned as a celebrity coach, joined by James Richmond of the Mississauga Steelheads, and assistants Brian Kilrea, Bert O'Brien. Team Orr was coached by Eric Lindros, joined by the Guelph Storm's coaching staff, George Burnett, Jake Grimes, and Luca Caputi. Team Cherry scored the first five goals of the game, en route to a 7–4 victory. Filip Zadina of the Halifax Mooseheads, Aidan Dudas of the Owen Sound Attack, and Ty Dellandrea of the Flint Firebirds, all scored two goals each in the victory.

2018 Sherwin-Williams Top Prospects Game
Date	January 25, 2018, 7:00 pm	
Location	Sleeman Centre (Guelph, Ontario)	
Attendance	4,776	
Game report	Home	Away
Team	Team Cherry	Team Orr
Coach	Don Cherry	Eric Lindros
Player of the game	Evan Bouchard	Kevin Bahl
Score	7	4

== 2019 Sherwin-Williams Top Prospects Game ==
Ron MacLean coached Team Cherry, assisted by Dave Hunter and Brent Sutter. Kelly Hrudey returned to the Top Prospects Game to coach Team Orr, assisted by Marc Habscheid and Robyn Regehr. Team Orr scored four third period goals to win 5–4. Graeme Clarke of the Ottawa 67's, and Brett Leason of the Prince Albert Raiders both had a goal and an assist for Team Orr. Arthur Kaliyev of the Hamilton Bulldogs, and Nick Robertson of the Peterborough Petes both scored three points for Team Cherry.

2019 Sherwin-Williams Top Prospects Game
Date	January 23, 2019, 8:00 pm	
Location	ENMAX Centrium (Red Deer, Alberta)	
Attendance	5,432	
Game report	Home	Away
Team	Team Cherry	Team Orr
Coach	Ron MacLean	Kelly Hrudey
Player of the game	Peyton Krebs	Graeme Clarke
Score	4	5

== 2020 Kubota Top Prospects Game ==
Kubota was the title sponsor of the CHL/NHL Top Prospects Game from 2020 to 2024.

The CHL announced Kubota as the corporate title sponsor of the event, starting in 2020. Rob Wilson from the Peterborough Petes coached Team Red, and George Burnett from the Guelph Storm coached Team White. Tyson Foerster from the Barrie Colts, and Connor Zary from the Kamloops Blazers both scored three points in a 5–3 victory for Team White. Jeremie Poirier from the Saint John Sea Dogs scored two points for Team Red in the loss.

2020 Kubota Top Prospects Game
Date	January 16, 2020, 7:00 pm	
Location	FirstOntario Centre (Hamilton, Ontario)	
Attendance	6,436	
Game report	Home	Away
Team	Team Red	Team White
Coach	Rob Wilson	George Burnett
Player of the game	Jack Quinn	Tyson Foerster
Score	3	5

== 2022 Kubota Top Prospects Game ==
Following a one-year hiatus as a result of the COVID-19 pandemic, the CHL announced the return of the Top Prospects Game in 2022. Team Red was coached by Mike McKenzie of the Kitchener Rangers, assisted by Derek Roy, Jamie McLennan and Bryan Hayes. Team White was again coached by George Burnett of the Guelph Storm, assisted by Brian Kilrea, Jeff O'Neill and Michael DiStefano.

2022 Kubota Top Prospects Game
Date	March 23, 2022, 8:00 pm	
Location	Kitchener Memorial Auditorium Complex (Kitchener, Ontario)	
Attendance	5,969	
Game report	Home	Away
Team	Team Red	Team White
Coach	Mike McKenzie	George Burnett
Player of the game	Shane Wright	Jagger Firkus
Score	1	3

== 2023 Kubota Top Prospects Game ==
The 2023 game showcased 40 players including 19 from the WHL, 15 from the OHL, six from the QMJHL, and the expected first-overall draft pick Connor Bedard. Michael Dyck and Brent Seabrook, both of the Vancouver Giants, served as head coach of Team Red and Team White respectively. Four former Vancouver Canucks players served as assistant coaches; Henrik Sedin and Ron Delorme for Team Red, and Daniel Sedin and Stan Smyl for Team White.

Team White won the game by a 4–2 score, with goaltenders Scott Ratzlaff and Jackson Unger combining to make 45 saves. In the first period, Mathieu Cataford scored for Team Red, and Colby Barlow scored for Team White. After a scoreless second period, Team White had goals from Carson Rehkopf, Luca Pinelli, and Calum Ritchie. With 36 seconds remaining, Zach Benson scored the final goal for Team Red. Recognized as players of the game for their teams were Carson Rehkopf for Team White, and Riley Heidt for Team Red.

2023 Kubota Top Prospects Game
Date	January 25, 2023, 5:00 pm	
Location	Langley Events Centre (Langley, British Columbia)	
Attendance	5,276	
Game report	Home	Away
Team	Team White	Team Red
Coach	Michael Dyck	Brent Seabrook
Score	4	2

== 2024 Kubota Top Prospects Game ==
Forty players were chosen for the game, six of which were born outside of North America, including Harrison Brunicke who was born in South Africa. Adam Jecho was the highest-ranked European-born player. Team captains were Sam Dickinson for Team Red, and Berkly Catton for Team White. After a scoreless first period, Liam Greentree scored for Team White, then Ben Danford tied the game for Team Red. Raoul Boilard scored the winning goal six minutes into the third period. After an empty-net goal, Team Red won by a 3–1 score. Goaltenders Ryerson Leenders and Lukas Matecha combined for 38 saves on 39 shots for the win. Boilard was named player of the game for Red, and Tij Iginla was named player of the game for White.

2024 Kubota Top Prospects Game
Date	January 24, 2024, 7:30 pm	
Location	Avenir Centre (Moncton, New Brunswick)	
Game report	Home	Away
Team	Team Red	Team White
Coaches	Gerard Gallant & Daniel Lacroix	Jim Hulton & Mike Kelly
Score	3	1

== See also ==
- USA Hockey All-American Game, featuring American-born draft-eligible players
