= Réjean Cloutier =

Canadian ice hockey player

- Born: February 15, 1960 (age 65) Windsor, Quebec, Canada
- Height: 6 ft 1 in (185 cm)
- Weight: 190 lb (86 kg; 13 st 8 lb)
- Position: Defence
- Shot: Left
- Played for: Detroit Red Wings
- NHL draft: Undrafted
- Playing career: 1979–1988

Réjean Cloutier (born February 15, 1960) is a Canadian former professional ice hockey player who played for the Detroit Red Wings in the National Hockey League.

Cloutier was born in Windsor, Quebec.

== Career statistics ==
| | | | Regular season | | | | | Playoffs |
| Season | Team | League | GP | G | A | Pts | PIM | GP | G | A | Pts | PIM |
|---|---|---|---|---|---|---|---|---|---|---|---|---|
| 1977–78 | Sherbrooke Castors | QMJHL | 23 | 8 | 11 | 19 | 59 | 10 | 1 | 6 | 7 | 26 |
| 1978–79 | Sherbrooke Castors | QMJHL | 70 | 6 | 31 | 37 | 93 | 12 | 2 | 11 | 13 | 13 |
| 1979–80 | Sherbrooke Castors | QMJHL | 65 | 11 | 57 | 68 | 165 | 15 | 3 | 11 | 14 | 44 |
| 1979–80 | Detroit Red Wings | NHL | 3 | 0 | 1 | 1 | 0 | — | — | — | — | — |
| 1980–81 | Adirondack Red Wings | AHL | 76 | 7 | 30 | 37 | 193 | 15 | 1 | 2 | 3 | 27 |
| 1981–82 | Adirondack Red Wings | AHL | 64 | 11 | 27 | 38 | 140 | 5 | 0 | 2 | 2 | 6 |
| 1981–82 | Detroit Red Wings | NHL | 2 | 0 | 1 | 1 | 2 | — | — | — | — | — |
| 1982–83 | Adirondack Red Wings | AHL | 80 | 13 | 44 | 57 | 137 | 6 | 2 | 3 | 5 | 15 |
| 1983–84 | Adirondack Red Wings | AHL | 77 | 9 | 30 | 39 | 218 | 7 | 2 | 4 | 6 | 9 |
| 1984–85 | Adirondack Red Wings | AHL | 3 | 0 | 0 | 0 | 2 | — | — | — | — | — |
| 1984–85 | Nova Scotia Oilers | AHL | 72 | 8 | 19 | 27 | 152 | 6 | 1 | 1 | 2 | 14 |
| 1985–86 | Sherbrooke Canadiens | AHL | 67 | 7 | 23 | 30 | 142 | — | — | — | — | — |
| 1985–86 | Saginaw Generals | IHL | 2 | 0 | 0 | 0 | 4 | — | — | — | — | — |
| 1986–87 | Sherbrooke Canadiens | AHL | 76 | 7 | 37 | 44 | 182 | 17 | 3 | 9 | 12 | 59 |
| 1987–88 | SC Riessersee | Germany2 | 35 | 17 | 17 | 34 | 124 | — | — | — | — | — |
| 1988–89 | Brûleurs de Loups | France | 40 | 10 | 26 | 36 | 114 | — | — | — | — | — |
| 1996–97 | Windsor Papetiers | QSPHL | 12 | 1 | 4 | 5 | 58 | — | — | — | — | — |
| NHL totals | | | 5 | 0 | 2 | 2 | 2 | — | — | — | — | — |
| AHL totals | | | 515 | 62 | 210 | 272 | 1,166 | 56 | 9 | 21 | 30 | 130 |
