= Corrado Micalef =

Canadian ice hockey player (born 1961)

- Born: April 20, 1961 (age 64) Montreal, Quebec, Canada
- Height: 5 ft 8 in (173 cm)
- Weight: 170 lb (77 kg; 12 st 2 lb)
- Position: Goaltender
- Caught: Right
- Played for: Detroit Red Wings; HC Fribourg-Gotteron; Ours de Villard-de-Lans; HC Briançon; HC Varese; HC Courmaosta
- National team: Canada
- NHL draft: 44th overall, 1981; Detroit Red Wings
- Playing career: 1981–2002

Corrado Micalef (born April 20, 1961) is a Canadian former professional ice hockey goaltender who played five seasons with the Detroit Red Wings of the National Hockey League from 1981 to 1986. He later spent several years playing in Europe, retiring in 2002.

== Playing career ==
Born in Montreal, Quebec, Micalef was drafted 44th overall by the Detroit Red Wings in 1981 after a standout junior career with the Sherbrooke Castors. In 1980, he won the Jacques Plante Memorial Trophy for having the lowest goals against average in the high scoring QMJHL. He also represented Canada at the 1981 World Junior Championships before turning pro the next season. Micalef split the 1981–82 season between the NHL and the IHL's Kalamazoo Wings.

During his time in Detroit, Micalef was chiefly used in a tandem with goaltenders Gilles Gilbert and Greg Stefan. He was voted the Wings' "Rookie of the Year" in 1981–82. He was named to the Canadian national team at the 1986 World Championships but did not play any games, before taking his hockey career to Europe in 1986–87, making stops in Switzerland, France, and Italy. He briefly returned to North America to play with the IHL's San Francisco Spiders in 1995–96 before returning to Europe to finish his playing career in Germany.

== Coaching ==
Up to July 2013, Micalef was an assistant coach for the QMJHL's Charlottetown Islanders.

== Career statistics ==
=== Regular season and playoffs ===
			Regular season									Playoffs
Season	Team	League	GP	W	L	T	MIN	GA	SO	GAA	SV%	GP	W	L	MIN	GA	SO	GAA	SV%
1978–79	Sherbrooke Castors	QMJHL	42	18	11	3	2045	142	1	4.17	.871	4	—	—	38	2	0	3.16	.920
1979–80	Sherbrooke Castors	QMJHL	64	37	17	7	3598	252	1	4.20	.874	15	10	5	842	52	0	3.71	.883
1980–81	Sherbrooke Castors	QMJHL	64	35	26	3	3764	180	2	4.46	.878	14	7	7	842	46	1	3.28	.920
1980–81	Cornwall Royals	M-Cup	—	—	—	—	—	—	—	—	—	3	3	0	140	6	0	2.57	.934
1981–82	Detroit Red Wings	NHL	18	4	10	1	808	63	0	4.68	.843	—	—	—	—	—	—	—	—
1981–82	Adirondack Red Wings	AHL	1	0	0	0	10	0	0	0.00	1.000	—	—	—	—	—	—	—	—
1981–82	Kalamazoo Wings	IHL	20	—	—	—	1146	91	1	4.76	—	1	—	—	25	5	0	11.90	—
1982–83	Detroit Red Wings	NHL	34	11	13	5	1752	106	2	3.63	.861	—	—	—	—	—	—	—	—
1982–83	Adirondack Red Wings	AHL	11	6	5	0	660	37	0	3.36	—	—	—	—	—	—	—	—	—
1983–84	Detroit Red Wings	NHL	14	5	8	1	802	52	0	3.89	.854	1	0	0	7	2	0	17.14	.600
1983–84	Adirondack Red Wings	AHL	29	14	10	5	1767	132	0	4.48	.855	1	0	0	1	0	0	0.00	1.000
1984–85	Detroit Red Wings	NHL	36	5	19	7	1848	136	0	4.42	.862	2	0	0	42	6	0	8.57	.667
1984–85	Adirondack Red Wings	AHL	1	1	0	0	60	2	0	2.00	.943	—	—	—	—	—	—	—	—
1985–86	Detroit Red Wings	NHL	11	1	9	1	563	52	0	5.54	.848	—	—	—	—	—	—	—	—
1985–86	Kalamazoo Wings	IHL	7	—	—	—	398	29	0	4.37	—	—	—	—	—	—	—	—	—
1985–86	Adirondack Red Wings	AHL	25	12	9	2	1436	93	0	3.89	.873	—	—	—	—	—	—	—	—
1986–87	Adirondack Red Wings	AHL	1	0	1	0	59	5	0	5.08	.783	—	—	—	—	—	—	—	—
1986–87	HC Fribourg-Gotteron	NLA	13	—	—	—	710	66	0	5.57	—	—	—	—	—	—	—	—	—
1988–89	Ours de Villard-de-Lans	FRA	17	—	—	—	1013	78	0	4.62	—	—	—	—	—	—	—	—	—
1989–90	Ours de Villard-de-Lans	FRA	30	—	—	—	1670	168	0	6.04	—	—	—	—	—	—	—	—	—
1990–91	HC Briançon	FRA	28	—	—	—	1643	85	0	3.11	—	7	—	—	—	—	—	—	—
1991–92	HC Briançon	FRA	19	—	—	—	1093	54	1	2.96	—	—	—	—	—	—	—	—	—
1992–93	HC Varese	ALP	19	—	—	—	1077	84	0	4.68	—	—	—	—	—	—	—	—	—
1993–94	HC Courmaosta	ITA	26	—	—	—	1433	95	0	3.98	—	—	—	—	—	—	—	—	—
1994–95	HC Courmaosta	ALP	42	—	—	—	—	—	—	—	—	—	—	—	—	—	—	—	—
1995–96	San Francisco Spiders	IHL	18	4	8	2	851	56	0	3.95	.882	—	—	—	—	—	—	—	—
1996–97	EHC Trier	GER-2	39	—	—	—	2249	139	4	3.63	—	—	—	—	—	—	—	—	—
1997–98	EHC Trier	GER-2	34	—	—	—	—	—	—	—	—	—	—	—	—	—	—	—	—
1998–99	EHC Harz	GER-2	42	—	—	—	2479	115	5	2.78	—	4	—	—	235	5	1	1.28	—
1999–00	ESCH Erfurt	GER-3	48	—	—	—	2714	120	6	2.65	—	—	—	—	—	—	—	—	—
2001–02	ESV Bayreuth	GER-3	4	3	1	0	243	15	0	3.70	—	—	—	—	—	—	—	—	—
NHL totals			113	26	59	15	5772	409	2	4.25	.856	3	0	0	49	8	0	9.80	.652

=== International ===
Year	Team	Event	GP	W	L	T	MIN	GA	SO	GAA	SV%
1981	Canada	WJC	5	1	2	1	207	20	0	5.79	—
Junior totals			5	1	2	1	207	20	0	5.79	—
