= Robert Lebel Trophy =

The Robert Lebel Trophy is awarded annually to the team in the Quebec Maritimes Junior Hockey League with the lowest goals against average in the regular season. The trophy is named for Robert Lebel, founding president of the QMJHL, and a former goaltender.

== Winners ==
Season	Team	GAA
1977–78	Trois-Rivières Draveurs	3.50
1978–79	Trois-Rivières Draveurs	3.24
1979–80	Sherbrooke Castors	4.36
1980–81	Sorel Éperviers	4.14
1981–82	Montreal Juniors	3.86
1982–83	Shawinigan Cataractes	3.34
1983–84	Shawinigan Cataractes	4.10
1984–85	Shawinigan Cataractes	3.75
1985–86	Hull Olympiques	3.64
1986–87	Longueuil Chevaliers	3.70
1987–88	Saint-Jean Castors	4.04
1988–89	Hull Olympiques	3.66
1989–90	Victoriaville Tigres	3.19
1990–91	Chicoutimi Saguenéens	3.19
1991–92	Trois-Rivières Draveurs	3.16
1992–93	Sherbrooke Faucons	3.44
1993–94	Verdun Collège Français	3.36
1994–95	Beauport Harfangs	2.81
1995–96	Granby Prédateurs	2.73
1996–97	Hull Olympiques	2.86
1997–98	Quebec Remparts	2.91
1998–99	Halifax Mooseheads	2.89
1999–2000	Moncton Wildcats	2.90
2000–01	Shawinigan Cataractes	2.64
2001–02	Halifax Mooseheads	2.70
2002–03	Acadie–Bathurst Titan	2.60
2003–04	Cape Breton Screaming Eagles	2.33
2004–05	Halifax Mooseheads	2.70
2005–06	Moncton Wildcats	2.61
2006–07	Lewiston Maineiacs	2.78
2007–08	Chicoutimi Saguenéens	2.90
2008–09	Moncton Wildcats	2.16
2009–10	Moncton Wildcats	2.39
2010–11	Saint John Sea Dogs	2.34
2011–12	Shawinigan Cataractes	2.55
2012–13	Halifax Mooseheads	2.55
2013–14	Baie-Comeau Drakkar	2.50
2014–15	Blainville-Boisbriand Armada	2.72
2015–16	Gatineau Olympiques	2.54
2016–17	Blainville-Boisbriand Armada	2.51
2017–18	Rimouski Océanic	2.56
2018–19	Rouyn-Noranda Huskies	2.03
2019–20	Moncton Wildcats	2.30
2020–21	Val-d'Or Foreurs	2.12
2021–22	Quebec Remparts	2.56
2022–23	Quebec Remparts	2.35
2023–24	Baie-Comeau Drakkar	2.40
2024–25	Moncton Wildcats	2.23
2025–26	Chicoutimi Saguenéens	2.30
