= Alain Vigneault =

Canadian ice hockey player and coach

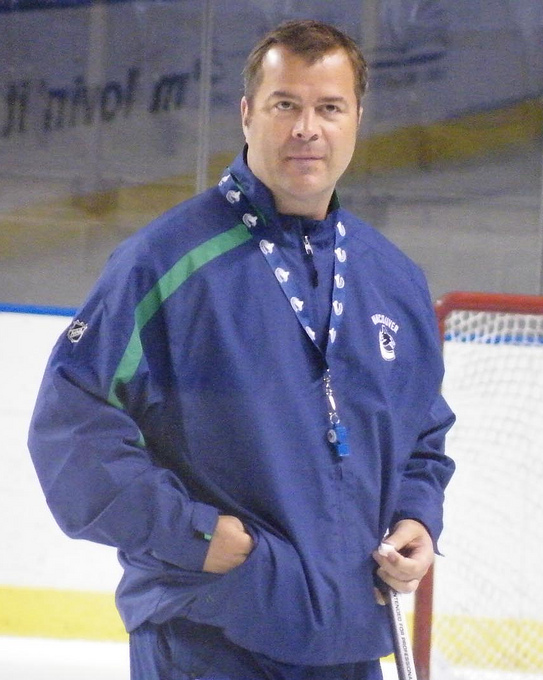
- Vigneault with the Vancouver Canucks in 2009
- Born: May 14, 1961 (age 65) Quebec City, Quebec, Canada
- Height: 5 ft 11 in (180 cm)
- Weight: 200 lb (91 kg; 14 st 4 lb)
- Position: Defence
- Shot: Right
- Played for: St. Louis Blues
- Coached for: Montreal Canadiens; Vancouver Canucks; New York Rangers; Philadelphia Flyers
- NHL draft: 167th overall, 1981; St. Louis Blues
- Playing career: 1981–1984
- Coaching career: 1986–2021

Alain Vigneault (born May 14, 1961) is a Canadian former professional ice hockey coach. Vigneault has previously coached the Montreal Canadiens, Vancouver Canucks, New York Rangers and the Philadelphia Flyers for 19 seasons in the NHL, as well as in the Quebec Major Junior Hockey League (QMJHL). During his career with the Canucks, he won the Jack Adams Award as the NHL's top coach of the year in 2006–07 and became the team's record holder for wins as a coach. Under Vigneault, Vancouver won back-to-back Presidents' Trophies (2011 and 2012) and made one appearance in the Stanley Cup Final (2011). In his first season with New York, he led the Rangers to their first Stanley Cup Final appearance (2014) in 20 years and a Presidents' Trophy in 2015.

Prior to his coaching career, Vigneault played professionally as a defenceman for six seasons in the NHL, Central Hockey League and American Hockey League (AHL). In the NHL, he played 42 games over two seasons, 1981–82 and 1982–83, for the St. Louis Blues.

== Playing career ==
As a youth, Vigneault played in the 1973 and 1974 Quebec International Pee-Wee Hockey Tournaments with a minor ice hockey team from Hull, Quebec, and then a team from East Ottawa.

Vigneault played as a defenceman in the QMJHL for four seasons, beginning in 1977–78 with the Hull Olympiques. He recorded 11 goals and 46 points over 59 games as a rookie, before improving to 13 goals and 54 points over 72 games to rank fifth in team scoring the following season. In his third QMJHL season, Vigneault was traded from Hull to the Trois Rivieres Draveurs. Between the two teams, he accumulated a junior career-high 64 points (11 goals and 53 assists) over 63 games. The following season, his fourth and final in the QMJHL, he tallied seven goals and 62 points over 67 games, before adding four goals and ten points in 19 playoff games. His efforts helped the Draveurs to the QMJHL Finals, where they were defeated four-games-to-one by the Cornwall Royals.

Following his QMJHL career, Vigneault was selected in the eighth round, 167th overall, by the St. Louis Blues in the 1981 NHL entry draft. He joined the Blues organization during the 1981–82 season where he appeared in 14 games for the club; tallying 1 goal and 2 assists. The remainder of his rookie season was spent in the minor league with the Blues' Central Hockey League (CHL) affiliate, the Salt Lake Golden Eagles. Vigneault was called up to the Blues again the following season where he recorded a goal and three assists in 28 regular season appearances, as well as one assist in four in the playoffs games, while splitting time with the Eagles. The 1983 playoffs were Vigneault's final appearances as a player in the NHL, as he finished his career the following season splitting time between the Maine Mariners of the AHL and the Montana Magic in the CHL.

== Coaching career ==
=== QMJHL and Ottawa Senators ===
Vigneault began his coaching career at the age of 25 in 1986–87, one season after his retirement as a player. He began in the QMJHL, coaching one season for the Trois-Rivières Draveurs and five for the Hull Olympiques, the same two teams he played junior hockey for. He coached the Olympiques to personal QMJHL regular season bests in 1987–88 with a 43–23–4 record and a playoff championship.

In the 1992–93 season, Vigneault got his first break in the National Hockey League (NHL) as an assistant coach with the expansion Ottawa Senators. After 3 1/2 years in that position, the Senators' assistant coaches were dismissed during the 1995–96 season and Vigneault returned to the QMJHL to coach the Beauport Harfangs. He led the team to his second QMJHL Finals appearance, where they were defeated by the Granby Prédateurs.

=== Montreal Canadiens ===
After a full season with the Harfangs in 1996–97, Vigneault began his second stint in the NHL and his first as a head coach, with the Montreal Canadiens. Becoming the 20th coach in the history of the Original Six team, he replaced Mario Tremblay. After winning the Stanley Cup in 1993, the team had not advanced past the first round of the playoffs in the four years since. In his first season with the Canadiens, he coached the team to a regular season record of 37 wins, 32 losses and 13 ties to rank fourth in the Northeast Division. They then advanced to the second round with a four-games-to-two series victory over the Pittsburgh Penguins, before being swept in four games by the Buffalo Sabres. The following season, however, the Canadiens failed to make the playoffs with a 32–39–11 record.

During his third season with the Canadiens in 1999–2000, he returned to above-.500, despite numerous long-term injuries to key players, just narrowly missing a postseason berth. For his efforts, despite his team failing to make the playoffs for a second-straight year, he was nominated for the Jack Adams Award as the League's coach of the year, ultimately losing the award to Joel Quenneville of the St. Louis Blues. After the Canadiens continued to struggle the following season, Vigneault was fired midway through the campaign and replaced by Michel Therrien.

Following his tenure with the Canadiens, he spent 2 1/2 years inactive as a coach. In 2003–04, he was hired to coach the Prince Edward Island Rocket. That season, he coached them to a 40–19–5 record and a second-round appearance in the playoff.

=== Vancouver Canucks ===
After another season with the Rocket, in which the team finished out of the playoffs, Vigneault was hired by the Vancouver Canucks organization to coach their minor-league affiliate, the Manitoba Moose, of the American Hockey League (AHL). Following a successful season in Manitoba, in which the Moose earned 100 points and reached the second round of the playoffs, he was chosen to replace Marc Crawford as the Canucks' head coach ahead of the 2006–07 season. The Canucks had failed to qualify for the playoffs in Crawford's last season with the club and were seen to have underperformed after being considered Stanley Cup contenders after the 2004–05 NHL lockout. In replacing Crawford, who was the Canucks' record holder for all-time wins by a coach, Vigneault became the 16th coach in team history. While Crawford was known for coaching the team under an offence-first mentality, Vigneault had a defensive-minded reputation at the time of his hiring. In addition to letting Crawford go, General Manager Dave Nonis retooled the team considerably. Key offensive players Ed Jovanovski and Todd Bertuzzi departed as stay-at-home defenceman Willie Mitchell and star goaltender Roberto Luongo were brought in.

In his first season as head coach of the Canucks, Vigneault coached them to a franchise record 49 wins, eclipsing the 46-win season recorded under Pat Quinn in 1992–93. The team won the regular season Northwest Division title and finished third in the West altogether. The Canucks defeated the Dallas Stars in seven games in the first round of the 2007 playoffs before being eliminated in the second round in five games by the eventual Stanley Cup champions, the Anaheim Ducks. As a result of the successful 2006–07 season, Vigneault received his second Jack Adams Award nomination and beat out Lindy Ruff of the Buffalo Sabres and Michel Therrien of the Pittsburgh Penguins in voting to win the coach of the year on June 14, 2007.

The Canucks failed to qualify for the playoffs in 2008 and GM Dave Nonis was fired. After Nonis' successor, Mike Gillis, was brought in, it was speculated whether or not he would retain Vigneault. After several meetings with Gillis, Vigneault was re-signed to a one-year contract extension to keep him in Vancouver to the 2009–10 season. Vigneault's assistant coaches Barry Smith and Mike Kelly, inherited from Crawford's coaching staff, were both fired.

With the departure of captain Markus Näslund in the 2008 off-season, Vigneault and team management controversially selected Roberto Luongo as the Canucks' new captain, despite NHL rules forbidding goaltenders to be chosen for the position. Luongo became the first goaltender to captain an NHL team in 60 years, though he was not permitted to wear the captain's "C" on his jersey, nor was he permitted to perform the traditional on-ice duties of a captain in the NHL (such as speaking to the referees on behalf of the coach). Under new leadership and management, Vigneault and the Canucks returned to the postseason and won their second Northwest Division title in three years. They swept the sixth-seeded St. Louis Blues in the first round of the 2009 playoffs but were once again defeated in the second round, however; this time by the fourth-seeded Chicago Blackhawks in six games.

About to enter the final year of his contract in 2009–10, Vigneault was signed to a three-year extension in September 2009. The Canucks matched their franchise-best 49 wins from Vigneault's first season and repeated as Northwest Division champions and as the third seed in the West for the second consecutive season and third time in four seasons. The Canucks defeated the Los Angeles Kings in six games the first round of the 2010 playoffs before being eliminated by the Chicago Blackhawks in the second round in six games for the second consecutive year.

After finishing near the top of their conference for the majority of Vigneault's tenure with the team up to the 2009–10 season, the Canucks won their first-ever Presidents' Trophy as the league's best regular season team after a franchise year of 54 wins and 117 points for the 2010–11 season. In the 2011 playoffs, they advanced to the Stanley Cup Final for the first time since 1994, but lost the series in seven games to the Boston Bruins, one win short from winning the Stanley Cup and giving up a 3–2 series lead in the process. Vigneault earned his third nomination for the Jack Adams Award, but lost to Dan Bylsma of the Pittsburgh Penguins.

The 2011–12 season saw the Canucks repeat as the Presidents' Trophy winners. During the season on November 23, 2011, Vigneault became the most winning coach in Canucks history with his 247th victory with the team, a 3–0 shutout win against the Colorado Avalanche. At 427 games, it took him 97 fewer contests than his predecessor, Marc Crawford, to set the mark. Though the league's best regular season team once more in 2011–12, the Canucks were eliminated from the 2012 playoffs in the first round; losing in five games to the eventual champion, the eighth-seeded Los Angeles Kings.

On May 23, 2012, a month after the Canucks upset against the Kings, Vigneault signed a two-year extension with the Canucks for an undisclosed amount.

After finishing the lockout-shortened 2012–13 season as the Northwest Division champions for the fifth straight season and the third seed in the Western Conference altogether, the Canucks were swept in the first round of the 2013 playoffs by the sixth-seeded San Jose Sharks. The Canucks fired Vigneault along with assistant coaches Rick Bowness and Newell Brown on May 22, 2013, 15 days after the Canucks were defeated by the Sharks.

=== New York Rangers ===
On June 21, 2013, the New York Rangers hired Vigneault to be their 34th head coach, replacing John Tortorella, who coincidentally was hired as Vigneault's replacement for the Vancouver Canucks only for Tortorella to get fired the following off-season after one season with the club. Vigneault signed a five-year, $10 million contract with the Rangers. Vigneault's Rangers initially struggled in the first half of the 2013–14 season, but finished very strong. The Rangers finished second in the Metropolitan Division and fifth in the East, qualifying for the postseason and making it to the team's first Stanley Cup Final since they defeated the Vancouver Canucks in the 1993–94 season. The team, however, lost to the Los Angeles Kings in five games in the Stanley Cup Final.

On February 14, 2015, Vigneault collected his 500th career win, in a 5–1 win over the Arizona Coyotes, becoming the 21st head coach in NHL history to reach the mark. The 2014–15 season, Vigneault's second season with the team ended with the Rangers setting a franchise record with 113 points in the regular season, winning the NHL's Presidents' Trophy for the first time since the Stanley Cup-winning 1993–94 season. Vigneault was named a finalist for the Jack Adams Award for the fourth time in his career, which was awarded to Bob Hartley of the Calgary Flames. In the first round of the 2015 playoffs, the Rangers knocked out the eighth-seeded Pittsburgh Penguins in five games, winning the fifth and clinching game on an overtime winner from Carl Hagelin. It was the earliest Sidney Crosby and the Penguins had been eliminated from the playoffs since his sophomore season in 2006–07. In the second round the Rangers found themselves facing a familiar foe in Alexander Ovechkin and the Washington Capitals, the fifth meeting between the two franchises since 2009 (each team had won two). The Rangers fell behind 3–1 in the series and were down 1–0 in game five, a mere 101 seconds from elimination, before Chris Kreider broke the shutout. In overtime, team captain Ryan McDonagh scored the game winner to send the series back to Washington. In game six, Kreider once again sparked the team, scoring in the first minute and final second of the first period as the Rangers withstood a late rally by the Capitals to win 4–3 and force a game 7 at Madison Square Garden. Anticipation was extremely high for this game as prices for a seat reached record prices. Ovechkin opened the scoring on a high glove wrist shot in the first period but Rangers' rookie Kevin Hayes evened the score on the power play. In the first game 7 overtime at Madison Square Garden since the 1994 Stanley Cup Final, Derek Stepan scored the game-winning goal against the fourth-seeded Capitals, sending the Rangers to their second straight appearance in the Eastern Conference finals and third in four seasons, where they would eventually be eliminated in seven games by the third-seeded Tampa Bay Lightning, one win short from a second consecutive Stanley Cup Final.

On December 11, 2015, in a 4–2 win over the Edmonton Oilers, Vigneault coached his 1,000th NHL game as a head coach.

On January 31, 2017, the Rangers signed Vigneault to a two-year contract extension worth $4 million annually.

On April 7, 2018, immediately after the last game of the 2017–18 season where the Rangers lost 5–0 to the Philadelphia Flyers, the Rangers fired Vigneault after the team finished the season with a 34–39–9 record, coming 20 points out of a playoff spot, missing the playoffs for the first time since 2010.

=== Philadelphia Flyers ===
On April 15, 2019, the Philadelphia Flyers hired Vigneault as their head coach. In the 2019–20 season, his first season with the Flyers, he led the club to a 41–21–7 record and a playoff appearance, before the season ended three weeks earlier than supposed to as a result of the restrictions surrounding the COVID-19 pandemic. After the premature end of the regular season, Vigneault was a finalist for the Jack Adams Award for the fifth time in his coaching career, coming in second in final voting to the Boston Bruins' Bruce Cassidy. In the 2020 playoffs, the Flyers defeated Vigneault's former team, the Montreal Canadiens in six games before getting defeated in the next round by the New York Islanders in seven games.

On February 28, 2021, Vigneault won his 700th career game as a head coach, a 3–0 shutout win over the Buffalo Sabres, becoming the ninth coach in NHL history to reach the milestone.

On December 6, the Flyers fired Vigneault following a 7–1 loss to the Tampa Bay Lightning. The loss extended their losing streak to eight games amidst falling to an 8–10–4 record to begin the 2021–22 season after missing the playoffs in the previous season.

=== Retirement ===
In a July 2023 interview with Le Journal de Montreal, Vigneault revealed that he has retired from professional hockey.

== Career statistics ==
=== Regular season and playoffs ===
			Regular season					Playoffs
Season	Team	League	GP	G	A	Pts	PIM	GP	G	A	Pts	PIM
1977–78	Hull Olympiques	QMJHL	59	11	35	46	92	4	0	1	1	20
1978–79	Hull Olympiques	QMJHL	72	13	41	54	217	—	—	—	—	—
1979–80	Hull Olympiques	QMJHL	35	5	34	39	82	—	—	—	—	—
1979–80	Trois-Rivières Draveurs	QMJHL	28	6	19	25	93	7	1	5	6	30
1980–81	Trois-Rivières Draveurs	QMJHL	67	7	55	62	181	19	4	6	10	53
1981–82	St. Louis Blues	NHL	14	1	2	3	43	—	—	—	—	—
1981–82	Salt Lake Golden Eagles	CHL	64	2	10	12	266	7	1	1	2	37
1982–83	St. Louis Blues	NHL	28	1	3	4	39	4	0	1	1	26
1982–83	Salt Lake Golden Eagles	CHL	33	1	4	5	189	—	—	—	—	—
1983–84	Montana Magic	CHL	47	2	14	16	139	—	—	—	—	—
1983–84	Maine Mariners	AHL	11	0	1	1	46	1	0	0	0	4
NHL totals			42	2	5	7	82	4	0	1	1	26
CHL totals			144	5	28	33	594	7	1	1	2	37

== NHL coaching record ==
Team	Year	Regular season							Postseason			
Team	Year	G	W	L	T	OTL	Pts	Finish	W	L	Win%	Result
MTL	1997–98	82	37	32	13	—	87	4th in Northeast	4	6	.400	Lost in conference semifinals (BUF)
MTL	1998–99	82	32	39	11	—	75	5th in Northeast	—	—	—	Missed playoffs
MTL	1999–00	82	35	34	9	4	83	4th in Northeast	—	—	—	Missed playoffs
MTL	2000–01	20	5	13	2	0	(12)	(fired)	—	—	—	—
MTL total		266	109	118	35	4			4	6	.400	1 playoff appearance
VAN	2006–07	82	49	26	—	7	105	1st in Northwest	5	7	.417	Lost in conference semifinals (ANA)
VAN	2007–08	82	39	33	—	10	88	5th in Northwest	—	—	—	Missed playoffs
VAN	2008–09	82	45	27	—	10	100	1st in Northwest	6	4	.600	Lost in conference semifinals (CHI)
VAN	2009–10	82	49	28	—	5	103	1st in Northwest	6	6	.500	Lost in conference semifinals (CHI)
VAN	2010–11	82	54	19	—	9	117	1st in Northwest	15	10	.600	Lost in Stanley Cup Final (BOS)
VAN	2011–12	82	51	22	—	9	111	1st in Northwest	1	4	.200	Lost in conference quarterfinals (LAK)
VAN	2012–13	48	26	15	—	7	59	1st in Northwest	0	4	.000	Lost in conference quarterfinals (SJS)
VAN total		540	313	170	—	57			33	35	.485	6 playoff appearances
NYR	2013–14	82	45	31	—	6	96	2nd in Metropolitan	13	12	.520	Lost in Stanley Cup Final (LAK)
NYR	2014–15	82	53	22	—	7	113	1st in Metropolitan	11	8	.579	Lost in conference finals (TBL)
NYR	2015–16	82	46	27	—	9	101	3rd in Metropolitan	1	4	.200	Lost in first round (PIT)
NYR	2016–17	82	48	28	—	6	102	4th in Metropolitan	6	6	.500	Lost in second round (OTT)
NYR	2017–18	82	34	39	—	9	77	8th in Metropolitan	—	—	—	Missed playoffs
NYR total		410	226	147	—	37			31	30	.531	4 playoff appearances
PHI	2019–20	69	41	21	—	7	89	2nd in Metropolitan	10	6	.625	Lost in second round (NYI)
PHI	2020–21	56	25	23	—	8	58	6th in East	—	—	—	Missed playoffs
PHI	2021–22	22	8	10	—	4	(20)	(fired)	—	—	—	—
PHI total		147	74	54	—	19			10	6	.625	1 playoff appearance
Total		1,363	722	489	35	117			78	77	.503	12 playoff appearances

== Awards and accomplishments ==
- Brian Kilrea Coach of the Year Award (QMJHL) – 1988
- Jack Adams Award winner (NHL coach of the year) – 2007
- Named a co-coach for the 58th National Hockey League All-Star Game – 2011
- Vancouver Canucks all-time winningest coach - 313

== See also ==
- List of NHL head coaches

Preceded by Mario Tremblay	Head coach of the Montreal Canadiens; 1997–2000	Succeeded by Michel Therrien
Preceded by Lindy Ruff	Jack Adams Award Winners; 2007	Succeeded by Bruce Boudreau
Preceded by Marc Crawford	Head coach of the Vancouver Canucks; 2006–2013	Succeeded by John Tortorella
Preceded by John Tortorella	Head coach of the New York Rangers; 2013–2018	Succeeded by David Quinn
Preceded by Scott Gordon (interim)	Head coach of the Philadelphia Flyers; 2019–2021	Succeeded by Mike Yeo (interim)
