= Gaston Therrien =

Canadian ice hockey player

- Born: May 27, 1960 (age 65) Montreal, Quebec, Canada
- Height: 5 ft 11 in (180 cm)
- Weight: 181 lb (82 kg; 12 st 13 lb)
- Position: Defence
- Shot: Right
- Played for: Quebec Nordiques; Ours de Villard-de-Lans; Diables Noirs de Tours; Jets de Viry-Essonne
- NHL draft: 129th overall, 1980; Quebec Nordiques
- Playing career: 1980–1993

Gaston Therrien (born May 27, 1960) is a Canadian former professional ice hockey player who played 22 games in the National Hockey League for the Quebec Nordiques between 1981 and 1983. He works for Réseau des sports (RDS), a sportscasting channel in Quebec. Therrien was born in Montreal, Quebec. As a youth, he played in the 1973 Quebec International Pee-Wee Hockey Tournament with a minor ice hockey team from Rosemont, Quebec.

== Career statistics ==
=== Regular season and playoffs ===
			Regular season					Playoffs
Season	Team	League	GP	G	A	Pts	PIM	GP	G	A	Pts	PIM
1976–77	Cap-de-la-Madeleine Barons	QJAHL	60	30	37	67	—	—	—	—	—	—
1977–78	Quebec Remparts	QMJHL	72	17	60	77	68	4	1	1	2	12
1978–79	Quebec Remparts	QMJHL	65	10	52	62	126	6	1	5	6	24
1979–80	Quebec Remparts	QMJHL	71	39	86	125	152	3	1	2	3	6
1980–81	Villars HC	NLB	—	—	—	—	—	—	—	—	—	—
1980–81	Quebec Nordiques	NHL	3	0	1	1	2	—	—	—	—	—
1980–81	Rochester Americans	AHL	18	2	10	12	6	—	—	—	—	—
1981–82	Quebec Nordiques	NHL	14	0	7	7	6	9	0	1	1	4
1981–82	Fredericton Express	AHL	61	11	42	53	79	—	—	—	—	—
1982–83	Quebec Nordiques	NHL	5	0	0	0	4	—	—	—	—	—
1982–83	Erie Golden Blades	ACHL	3	1	4	5	0	—	—	—	—	—
1982–83	Fredericton Express	AHL	41	3	10	13	60	—	—	—	—	—
1983–84	Villars HC	NLB	36	47	24	71	—	—	—	—	—	—
1984–85	SC Bern	NLB	—	—	—	—	—	—	—	—	—	—
1985–86	SC Bern	NLB	1	0	1	1	0	—	—	—	—	—
1986–87	Ours de Villard-de-Lans	FRA	29	36	48	84	—	—	—	—	—	—
1987–88	Ours de Villard-de-Lans	FRA	28	18	31	49	45	—	—	—	—	—
1988–89	Ours de Villard-de-Lans	FRA	39	25	31	56	50	2	1	2	3	6
1989–90	Ours de Villard-de-Lans	FRA	33	12	17	29	75	—	—	—	—	—
1990–91	Diables Noirs de Tours	FRA	22	9	20	29	24	3	1	0	1	8
1991–92	Jets de Viry-Essonne	FRA	12	7	11	18	28	16	10	10	20	14
1992–93	Jets de Viry-Essonne	FRA-2	28	23	26	49	—	—	—	—	—	—
AHL totals			120	16	62	78	145	—	—	—	—	—
NHL totals			22	0	8	8	12	9	0	1	1	4
