= Brian Johnson (ice hockey) =

Canadian ice hockey player

- Born: April 1, 1960 (age 65) Montreal, Quebec, Canada
- Height: 6 ft 1 in (185 cm)
- Weight: 185 lb (84 kg; 13 st 3 lb)
- Position: Right wing
- Shot: Right
- Played for: Detroit Red Wings
- NHL draft: Undrafted
- Playing career: 1980–1986

Brian Johnson (born April 1, 1960) is a Canadian former professional ice hockey right winger who played one season in the National Hockey League for the Detroit Red Wings.

Johnson spent four seasons in the Quebec Major Junior Hockey League with the Verdun/Sorel Éperviers and the Sherbrooke Beavers before signing with the Detroit Red Wings in 1980. He had spells in the American Hockey League with the Adirondack Red Wings and the Central Hockey League with the Dallas Black Hawks before making his debut for Detroit during the 1983-84 NHL season, playing a total of three regular season games, going pointless with five penalty minutes. After spells with the Carolina Thunderbirds and the Indianapolis Checkers, Johnson retired in 1986.

On April 16, 2012, Brian Johnson was sentenced to 4 years in prison for trafficking cocaine in Saint John, New Brunswick.

== Career statistics ==
			Regular season					Playoffs
Season	Team	League	GP	G	A	Pts	PIM	GP	G	A	Pts	PIM
1977–78	Verdun Eperviers	QMJHL	50	11	14	25	125	2	0	0	0	0
1978–79	Verdun Eperviers	QMJHL	71	32	36	68	192	11	1	6	7	61
1979–80	Verdun/Sorel Eperviers	QMJHL	21	8	27	35	68	—	—	—	—	—
1979–80	Sherbrooke Castors	QMJHL	49	32	52	84	144	15	11	15	26	66
1980–81	Adirondack Red Wings	AHL	65	10	21	31	193	8	0	0	0	33
1981–82	Dallas Black Hawks	CHL	79	18	36	54	223	16	4	3	7	129
1982–83	Adirondack Red Wings	AHL	67	6	16	22	250	6	1	2	3	15
1983–84	Detroit Red Wings	NHL	3	0	0	0	5	—	—	—	—	—
1983–84	Adirondack Red Wings	AHL	58	4	27	31	233	7	0	0	0	40
1985–86	Carolina Thunderbirds	ACHL	22	8	11	19	167	—	—	—	—	—
1985–86	Indianapolis Checkers	IHL	13	0	1	1	57	—	—	—	—	—
NHL totals			3	0	0	0	5	—	—	—	—	—
AHL totals			190	20	64	84	676	21	1	2	3	88
