= Réjean =

Réjean or Rejean is a French masculine given name. Notable people with this name include:

- Réjean Cloutier (born 1960), former professional hockey player
- Réjean Cournoyer (born 1971), Canadian actor and singer
- Réjean Ducharme (1941–2017), Quebec novelist and playwright
- Réjean Génois (born 1952), former professional and Davis Cup tennis player from Quebec City
- Réjean Houle (born 1949), retired Canadian ice hockey forward
- Réjean Lefebvre (born 1943), member of the Canadian House of Commons from 1993 to 2000
- Réjean Lemelin (born 1954), former National Hockey League goaltender
- Réjean Savoie (born 1952), businessman and former political figure in New Brunswick
- Rejean Stringer (born 1974), retired Canadian ice hockey forward
