= Christian Tanguay =

Canadian ice hockey player

- Born: August 4, 1962 (age 63) Beauport, Quebec, Canada
- Height: 5 ft 10 in (178 cm)
- Weight: 190 lb (86 kg; 13 st 8 lb)
- Position: Right wing
- Shot: Right
- Played for: Quebec Nordiques; HC Aruzono
- NHL draft: 171st overall, 1980; Quebec Nordiques
- Playing career: 1981–1984

Christian Tanguay (born August 4, 1962) is a Canadian retired ice hockey player. As a youth, he played in the 1975 Quebec International Pee-Wee Hockey Tournament with a minor ice hockey team from Villeneuve. He later played two games in the National Hockey League with the Quebec Nordiques during the 1981–82 season.

== Career statistics ==
=== Regular season and playoffs ===
			Regular season					Playoffs
Season	Team	League	GP	G	A	Pts	PIM	GP	G	A	Pts	PIM
1979–80	Trois-Rivières Draveurs	QMJHL	65	24	20	44	39	—	—	—	—	—
1980–81	Trois-Rivières Draveurs	QMJHL	72	45	39	84	34	—	—	—	—	—
1981–82	Trois-Rivières Draveurs	QMJHL	59	52	55	107	27	24	16	13	29	11
1981–82	Quebec Nordiques	NHL	2	0	0	0	0	—	—	—	—	—
1982–83	Milwaukee Admirals	IHL	14	8	11	19	6	—	—	—	—	—
1982–83	Fredericton Express	AHL	48	6	7	13	4	—	—	—	—	—
1983–84	Milwaukee Admirals	IHL	74	44	50	94	23	4	0	2	2	0
1983–84	Fredericton Express	AHL	3	2	0	2	0	—	—	—	—	—
1984–85	Muskegon Lumberjacks	IHL	19	1	8	9	9	—	—	—	—	—
1985–86	HC Auronzo	ITA	24	35	49	84	10	4	2	1	3	2
1985–86	Rimouski Mariniers	RHL	8	12	10	22	4	—	—	—	—	—
1986–87	Rivière-du-Loup 3L	RHL	29	37	29	66	4	12	12	12	24	—
1986–87	Milwaukee Admirals	IHL	3	0	0	0	0	—	—	—	—	—
1987–88	Chomedy Chibutco	QSAAL	—	—	—	—	—	—	—	—	—	—
1988–89	Chomedy Chibutco	QSAAL	—	—	—	—	—	—	—	—	—	—
1989–90	Chamonix HC	FRA-2	28	33	27	60	52	—	—	—	—	—
1997–98	St. Gabriel Blizzard	QSPHL	6	1	6	7	0	—	—	—	—	—
IHL totals			110	53	69	122	38	4	0	2	2	0
NHL totals			2	0	0	0	0	—	—	—	—	—
