= Pierre Aubry =

Canadian ice hockey player

- Born: April 15, 1960 (age 66) Cap-de-la-Madeleine, Quebec, Canada
- Height: 5 ft 10 in (178 cm)
- Weight: 172 lb (78 kg; 12 st 4 lb)
- Position: Left wing
- Shot: Left
- Played for: Quebec Nordiques; Detroit Red Wings; Chamonix; HC Fassa; Tours
- NHL draft: Undrafted
- Playing career: 1980–1991

Pierre Aubry (born April 15, 1960) is a Canadian former professional ice hockey left winger who played five seasons in the National Hockey League for the Quebec Nordiques and Detroit Red Wings from 1980–81 to 1984–85.

== Career ==
Aubry played 202 career NHL games, scoring twenty four goals and twenty-six assists for fifty points. He also played twenty career playoff games, scoring one goal and one assist. After leaving the NHL, Aubry played with the Adirondack Red Wings.

== Personal life ==
Aubry's son, Louis-Marc (born 1991), was selected by the Detroit Red Wings in the third round of the 2010 NHL entry draft. Louis-Marc also played in the Deutsche Eishockey Liga.

== Career statistics ==
=== Regular season and playoffs ===
| | | | Regular season | | | | | Playoffs |
| Season | Team | League | GP | G | A | Pts | PIM | GP | G | A | Pts | PIM |
|---|---|---|---|---|---|---|---|---|---|---|---|---|
| 1977–78 | Trois-Rivieres Draveurs | QMJHL | 41 | 20 | 25 | 45 | 29 | — | — | — | — | — |
| 1977–78 | Quebec Remparts | QMJHL | 32 | 18 | 19 | 37 | 19 | 4 | 1 | 2 | 3 | 16 |
| 1978–79 | Quebec Remparts | QMJHL | 7 | 2 | 3 | 5 | 5 | — | — | — | — | — |
| 1978–79 | Trois-Rivieres Draveurs | QMJHL | 67 | 53 | 45 | 98 | 97 | 13 | 2 | 5 | 7 | 10 |
| 1978–79 | Trois-Rivieres Draveurs | M-Cup | — | — | — | — | — | 4 | 0 | 1 | 1 | 0 |
| 1979–80 | Trois-Rivieres Draveurs | QMJHL | 72 | 85 | 62 | 147 | 82 | 7 | 5 | 3 | 8 | 14 |
| 1980–81 | Quebec Nordiques | NHL | 1 | 0 | 0 | 0 | 0 | — | — | — | — | — |
| 1980–81 | Rochester Americans | AHL | 1 | 0 | 0 | 0 | 0 | 11 | 0 | 3 | 3 | 9 |
| 1980–81 | Erie Blades | EHL | 71 | 66 | 68 | 134 | 99 | 8 | 7 | 8 | 15 | 4 |
| 1981–82 | Quebec Nordiques | NHL | 62 | 10 | 13 | 23 | 27 | 15 | 1 | 1 | 2 | 30 |
| 1981–82 | Fredericton Express | AHL | 11 | 6 | 5 | 11 | 10 | — | — | — | — | — |
| 1982–83 | Quebec Nordiques | NHL | 77 | 7 | 9 | 16 | 48 | 2 | 0 | 0 | 0 | 0 |
| 1983–84 | Quebec Nordiques | NHL | 23 | 1 | 1 | 2 | 17 | — | — | — | — | — |
| 1983–84 | Fredericton Express | AHL | 12 | 4 | 5 | 9 | 4 | — | — | — | — | — |
| 1983–84 | Detroit Red Wings | NHL | 14 | 4 | 1 | 5 | 8 | 3 | 0 | 0 | 0 | 2 |
| 1984–85 | Detroit Red Wings | NHL | 25 | 2 | 2 | 4 | 33 | — | — | — | — | — |
| 1984–85 | Adirondack Red Wings | AHL | 29 | 13 | 10 | 23 | 74 | — | — | — | — | — |
| 1985–86 | Adirondack Red Wings | AHL | 66 | 28 | 31 | 59 | 124 | 16 | 11 | 4 | 15 | 20 |
| 1986–87 | Chamonix | FRA | 36 | 50 | 35 | 85 | 83 | — | — | — | — | — |
| 1986–87 | Adirondack Red Wings | AHL | 17 | 3 | 7 | 10 | 23 | 9 | 1 | 3 | 4 | 32 |
| 1987–88 | Chamonix | FRA | 19 | 10 | 21 | 31 | 38 | — | — | — | — | — |
| 1987–88 | HC Fassa | ITA | 17 | 28 | 18 | 46 | 18 | — | — | — | — | — |
| 1988–89 | Geneve-Servette HC | NLB | 36 | 29 | 32 | 61 | 32 | — | — | — | — | — |
| 1989–90 | Tours | FRA | 32 | 31 | 35 | 66 | 100 | — | — | — | — | — |
| 1990–91 | Tours | FRA | 14 | 5 | 12 | 17 | 62 | 3 | 2 | 2 | 4 | 18 |
| 1997–98 | Asbestos Aztecs | QSPHL | 5 | 0 | 5 | 5 | 10 | — | — | — | — | — |
| NHL totals | | | 201 | 24 | 26 | 50 | 133 | 20 | 1 | 1 | 2 | 32 |
