= Denis Cyr =

Canadian ice hockey player (born 1961)

- Born: February 4, 1961 (age 65) Verdun, Quebec, Canada
- Height: 5 ft 10 in (178 cm)
- Weight: 180 lb (82 kg; 12 st 12 lb)
- Position: Right wing
- Shot: Left
- Played for: Calgary Flames; Chicago Blackhawks; St. Louis Blues
- NHL draft: 13th overall, 1980; Calgary Flames
- Playing career: 1980–1987

Denis Cyr (born February 4, 1961) is a Canadian former professional ice hockey right winger who played in the National Hockey League for the Calgary Flames, Chicago Black Hawks, and St. Louis Blues. He was also a member of the famous junior line, "Les Trois Denis", while a member of the Montreal Juniors of the Quebec Major Junior Hockey League.

== Playing career ==
As a youth, he played in the 1974 Quebec International Pee-Wee Hockey Tournament with a minor ice hockey team from Verdun, Quebec.

Cyr started his notable hockey career with the Montreal Juniors of the QMJHL. He was promptly put on a line with boyhood friends Denis Savard and Denis Tremblay in a line that was dubbed, "Les Trois Denis". They also shared more than first names, as they were all born on February 4, 1961, and also grew up together in the same Verdun neighbourhood . Savard, the most famous of the three and Hockey Hall of Fame member, asked "What are the odds of that when you think about it. We played together as kids from age eight all the way through until I turned pro." . The line would play two full seasons together from 1977-1979. The line combined for 299 points in its first season, and 366 in its second. Tremblay was traded after 24 games in 1979–80 , however Savard and Cyr both demolished their previous career highs, scoring 181 and 146 points, respectively.

While Tremblay would never be drafted, Cyr and Savard were both drafted in the first round of the 1980 NHL entry draft. Savard would be drafted third overall by the Chicago Black Hawks, and Cyr was drafted thirteenth overall by the Calgary Flames. Cyr would play one more season in junior, but he did finish the season playing ten games for the Flames. Cyr wasn't able to continue his scoring prowess with the Flames, and as a result he was traded to the Chicago Black Hawks in 1982 for Carey Wilson. The Hawks were hoping for Cyr to rekindle his chemistry with Denis Savard, who had already established himself as an elite NHLer by this time. However, Cyr still could not secure a permanent NHL position and after a couple of seasons moved on to the St. Louis Blues, and then retired after three seasons in their organization, most of which was spent playing for their minor league affiliate, the Peoria Rivermen of the International Hockey League, winning the Turner Cup in 1985. He would later become the General Manager of the Rivermen, going on to win the Turner Cup again in 1991.

Cyr finished his NHL career with 193 games played, scoring 41 goals and 43 assists for 84 points. He currently does work on behalf of the Chicago Blackhawk Alumni Association.

== Personal life ==
In 2008, Cyr created the Cyr Financial Group in Peoria. He was elected to the Peoria City Council by a single vote in 2017. Cyr was reelected to city council in 2021.

Cyr currently lives in Peoria, Illinois, with his two daughters. His wife, Jeanie, died on October 21, 2021.

== Career statistics ==
=== Regular season and playoffs ===
			Regular season					Playoffs
Season	Team	League	GP	G	A	Pts	PIM	GP	G	A	Pts	PIM
1977–78	Montréal Juniors	QMJHL	72	46	55	101	25	13	4	10	14	0
1978–79	Montréal Juniors	QMJHL	72	70	56	126	61	11	7	5	12	26
1979–80	Montréal Juniors	QMJHL	70	70	76	146	61	10	10	13	23	6
1980–81	Calgary Flames	NHL	10	1	4	5	0	—	—	—	—	—
1980–81	Montréal Juniors	QMJHL	57	50	40	90	53	6	6	12	37
1981–82	Calgary Flames	NHL	45	12	10	22	13	—	—	—	—	—
1981–82	Oklahoma City Stars	CHL	14	10	4	14	16	—	—	—	—	—
1982–83	Calgary Flames	NHL	11	1	1	2	0	—	—	—	—	—
1982–83	Chicago Black Hawks	NHL	41	7	8	2	1	0	0	0	0
1983–84	Chicago Black Hawks	NHL	46	12	13	25	19	—	—	—	—	—
1983–84	Springfield Indians	AHL	17	4	13	17	11	3	0	0	0	0
1984–85	St. Louis Blues	NHL	9	5	3	8	0	3	0	0	0	0
1984–85	Peoria Rivermen	IHL	62	26	51	28	20	18	14	32	14
1985–86	St. Louis Blues	NHL	31	3	4	7	2	—	—	—	—	—
1985–86	Peoria Rivermen	IHL	34	15	26	41	15	11	5	4	9	2
1986–87	Peoria Rivermen	IHL	81	29	41	70	10	—	—	—	—	—
NHL totals			193	41	43	84	36	4	0	0	0	0
IHL totals			177	70	118	188	53	31	23	18	41	16

=== International ===
Year	Team	Event	GP	G	A	Pts	PIM
1981	Canada	WJC	5	2	1	3	0
Junior totals			5	2	1	3	0

Preceded by Paul Reinhart	Calgary Flames' first-round draft pick 1980	Succeeded by Al MacInnis
