= André Doré =

Canadian ice hockey player

- Born: February 11, 1958 (age 67); Montreal, Quebec, Canada
- Height: 6 ft 2 in (188 cm)
- Weight: 200 lb (91 kg; 14 st 4 lb)
- Position: Defence
- Shot: Right
- Played for: New York Rangers; St. Louis Blues; Quebec Nordiques
- NHL draft: 60th overall, 1978; New York Rangers
- Playing career: 1978–1986

André Doré (born February 11, 1958) is a Canadian former professional ice hockey player who played 257 games in the National Hockey League with the New York Rangers, St. Louis Blues and Quebec Nordiques between 1979 and 1985.

== Playing career ==
As a youth, he played in the 1971 Quebec International Pee-Wee Hockey Tournament with a minor ice hockey team from Pointe-Claire. He played junior hockey for the Hull Olympiques, Trois-Rivières Draveurs, and the Quebec Remparts from 1975 to 1978. The New York Rangers chose him 60th overall in the 1978 NHL Amateur Draft.

Doré spent four and a half years with the Rangers, splitting the seasons between the NHL team and the minor pros. In 1983 he was traded to the Blues for Vaclav Nedomansky and Glen Hanlon. The following season he was sent to the Quebec Nordiques in exchange for Dave Pichette. The Rangers claimed him back in the 1984–85 season and he retired in 1986.

== Career statistics ==
=== Regular season and playoffs ===
			Regular season					Playoffs
Season	Team	League	GP	G	A	Pts	PIM	GP	G	A	Pts	PIM
1974–75	Quebec Remparts	QMJHL	4	0	0	0	7	—	—	—	—	—
1975–76	Quebec Remparts	QMJHL	28	2	6	8	15	—	—	—	—	—
1975–76	Hull Festivals	QMJHL	31	2	5	7	52	6	0	3	3	7
1976–77	Hull Olympiques	QMJHL	72	9	42	51	178	3	0	3	3	29
1977–78	Hull Olympiques	QMJHL	15	3	9	12	22	—	—	—	—	—
1977–78	Trois-Rivières Draveurs	QMJHL	27	2	14	16	61	—	—	—	—	—
1977–78	Quebec Remparts	QMJHL	32	6	17	23	51	4	0	0	0	2
1978–79	New York Rangers	NHL	2	0	0	0	0	—	—	—	—	—
1978–79	New Haven Nighthawks	AHL	71	6	23	29	134	10	0	3	3	12
1979–80	New York Rangers	NHL	2	0	0	0	0	—	—	—	—	—
1979–80	New Haven Nighthawks	AHL	64	9	21	30	99	9	1	1	2	20
1980–81	New York Rangers	NHL	15	1	3	4	15	—	—	—	—	—
1980–81	New Haven Nighthawks	AHL	58	8	41	49	105	—	—	—	—	—
1981–82	New York Rangers	NHL	56	4	16	20	64	10	1	1	2	16
1981–82	Springfield Indians	AHL	23	3	8	11	20	—	—	—	—	—
1982–83	New York Rangers	NHL	39	3	12	15	39	—	—	—	—	—
1982–83	St. Louis Blues	NHL	38	2	15	17	25	4	0	1	1	8
1983–84	St. Louis Blues	NHL	55	3	12	15	58	—	—	—	—	—
1983–84	Quebec Nordiques	NHL	25	1	16	17	25	9	0	0	0	8
1984–85	New York Rangers	NHL	25	0	7	7	35	—	—	—	—	—
1984–85	New Haven Nighthawks	AHL	39	3	22	25	48	—	—	—	—	—
1985–86	Hershey Bears	AHL	65	10	18	28	128	18	0	6	6	35
AHL totals			319	39	133	172	534	37	1	10	11	67
NHL totals			257	14	81	95	261	23	1	2	3	32
