= Gilles Hamel =

Canadian ice hockey player (born 1960)

- Born: March 18, 1960 (age 66) Asbestos, Quebec, Canada
- Height: 6 ft 3 in (191 cm)
- Weight: 183 lb (83 kg; 13 st 1 lb)
- Position: Left wing
- Shot: Left
- Played for: Buffalo Sabres; Winnipeg Jets; Los Angeles Kings
- NHL draft: 74th overall, 1979; Buffalo Sabres
- Playing career: 1980–1990

Gilles Julien Hamel (born March 18, 1960) is a Canadian former professional ice hockey right wing. He was drafted in the fourth round, 74th overall, by the Buffalo Sabres in the 1979 NHL entry draft. Gilles is the brother of Jean Hamel.

== Biography ==
Hamel was born in Asbestos, Quebec. As a youth, he played in the 1972 and 1973 Quebec International Pee-Wee Hockey Tournaments with a minor ice hockey team from Asbestos. He played three seasons of junior hockey in the Quebec Major Junior Hockey League. Hamel made his professional debut with the Sabres' American Hockey League affiliate, the Rochester Americans, in the 1980 Calder Cup playoffs. After six seasons in the National Hockey League with Buffalo, during which he scored 92 goals, he was traded to the Winnipeg Jets in exchange for Scott Arniel after the 1985–86 season.

Hamel had the most prolific goal-scoring season of his NHL career in 1986–87 with Winnipeg, notching 27 goals. After a mediocre 1987–88, however, and spending much of the early 1988–89 season in the AHL, Hamel was traded to the Los Angeles Kings in exchange for Paul Fenton. He played just eleven games with the Kings during that season, and spent the final year of his career playing in France.

In his NHL career, Hamel appeared in 519 games. He scored 127 goals and added 147 assists. He also played in 27 NHL playoff games, scoring four goals and five assists.

== Career statistics ==
=== Regular season and playoffs ===
			Regular season					Playoffs
Season	Team	League	GP	G	A	Pts	PIM	GP	G	A	Pts	PIM
1977–78	Laval National	QMJHL	72	44	37	81	63	5	2	2	4	4
1978–79	Laval National	QMJHL	72	56	55	111	130	—	—	—	—	—
1979–80	Trois-Rivières Draveurs	QMJHL	12	13	8	21	8	—	—	—	—	—
1979–80	Chicoutimi Saguenéens	QMJHL	57	73	62	135	87	12	10	6	16	18
1979–80	Rochester Americans	AHL	—	—	—	—	—	1	0	0	0	0
1980–81	Buffalo Sabres	NHL	51	10	9	19	53	5	0	1	1	4
1980–81	Rochester Americans	AHL	14	8	7	15	7	—	—	—	—	—
1981–82	Buffalo Sabres	NHL	16	2	7	9	2	—	—	—	—	—
1981–82	Rochester Americans	AHL	57	31	44	75	55	—	—	—	—	—
1982–83	Buffalo Sabres	NHL	66	22	20	42	26	9	2	2	4	2
1983–84	Buffalo Sabres	NHL	75	21	23	44	37	3	0	2	2	2
1984–85	Buffalo Sabres	NHL	80	18	30	48	36	1	0	0	0	0
1985–86	Buffalo Sabres	NHL	77	19	25	44	61	—	—	—	—	—
1986–87	Winnipeg Jets	NHL	79	27	21	48	24	8	2	0	2	2
1987–88	Winnipeg Jets	NHL	63	8	11	19	35	1	0	0	0	0
1988–89	Winnipeg Jets	NHL	1	0	0	0	0	—	—	—	—	—
1988–89	Moncton Hawks	AHL	14	7	5	12	10	—	—	—	—	—
1988–89	Los Angeles Kings	NHL	11	0	1	1	2	—	—	—	—	—
1988–89	New Haven Nighthawks	AHL	34	9	9	18	12	1	0	0	0	0
1989–90	Hockey Club de Caen	FRA	8	8	7	15	10	—	—	—	—	—
NHL totals			519	127	147	274	276	27	4	5	9	10
