= Jean-François Sauvé =

Canadian ice hockey player (born 1960)

- Born: January 23, 1960 (age 66) Sainte-Geneviève, Quebec, Canada
- Height: 5 ft 6 in (168 cm)
- Weight: 175 lb (79 kg; 12 st 7 lb)
- Position: Centre
- Shot: Left
- Played for: Buffalo Sabres; Quebec Nordiques
- NHL draft: Undrafted
- Playing career: 1980–1991

Jean-François Sauvé (French pronunciation: [ʒɑ̃ fʁɑ̃swa sove]; born January 23, 1960) is a Canadian former professional ice hockey centre. He played in the National Hockey League (NHL) with the Buffalo Sabres and Quebec Nordiques.

== Biography ==
Sauve was born in Sainte-Geneviève, Québec. As a youth, he played in the 1972 and 1973 Québec International Pee-Wee Hockey Tournaments with a minor ice hockey teams from Pierrefonds, Québec, and from the North shore of Montreal. In his NHL career, Sauvé appeared in 290 games. He scored sixty-five goals and added 138 assists.

Sauvé is the brother of former NHL goaltender Bob Sauvé and the uncle of former NHL goaltender Philippe Sauvé. Sauvé's son Maxime (born 1990) was selected 47th overall by the Boston Bruins in the 2008 NHL entry draft, and played one NHL game with the team. His nephew, Philippe Sauvé is an NHL hockey player like his brother, Robert Sauvé.

== Career statistics ==
			Regular season					Playoffs
Season	Team	League	GP	G	A	Pts	PIM	GP	G	A	Pts	PIM
1976–77	Lac St-Louis Lions	QMAAA	40	44	79	123	34	6	9	8	17	12
1977–78	Trois-Rivières Draveurs	QMJHL	6	2	3	5	0	13	4	9	13	20
1977–78	Trois-Rivières Draveurs	MC	—	—	—	—	—	4	0	1	1	0
1978–79	Trois-Rivières Draveurs	QMJHL	72	65	111	176	31	13	19	19	38	4
1978–79	Trois-Rivières Draveurs	MC	—	—	—	—	—	4	2	3	5	0
1979–80	Trois-Rivières Draveurs	QMJHL	72	63	124	187	31	7	5	9	14	0
1979–80	Rochester Americans	AHL	3	1	1	2	0	4	1	2	3	2
1980–81	Buffalo Sabres	NHL	20	5	9	14	12	5	2	0	2	0
1980–81	Rochester Americans	AHL	56	29	54	83	21	—	—	—	—	—
1981–82	Buffalo Sabres	NHL	69	19	36	55	46	2	0	2	2	0
1981–82	Rochester Americans	AHL	7	5	8	13	4	—	—	—	—	—
1982–83	Buffalo Sabres	NHL	9	0	4	4	9	—	—	—	—	—
1982–83	Rochester Americans	AHL	73	30	69	99	10	16	7	21	28	2
1983–84	Quebec Nordiques	NHL	39	10	17	27	2	9	2	5	7	2
1983–84	Fredericton Express	AHL	26	19	31	50	23	—	—	—	—	—
1984–85	Quebec Nordiques	NHL	64	13	29	42	21	18	5	5	10	8
1985–86	Quebec Nordiques	NHL	75	16	40	56	20	2	0	0	0	0
1986–87	HC Fribourg-Gottéron	NDA	32	32	58	90	31	—	—	—	—	—
1986–87	Quebec Nordiques	NHL	14	2	3	5	4	—	—	—	—	—
1987–88	HC Fribourg-Gottéron	NDA	36	34	52	86	40	—	—	—	—	—
1988–89	HC Fribourg-Gottéron	NDA	34	24	35	59	14	2	0	2	2	6
1988–89	Adirondack Red Wings	AHL	16	7	19	26	18	17	6	12	18	6
1989–90	ASG Tours	FRA	35	43	62	105	32	—	—	—	—	—
1990–91	ASG Tours	FRA	23	21	29	50	22	3	3	0	3	0
AHL totals			181	91	182	273	76	37	14	35	49	10
NHL totals			290	65	138	203	114	36	9	12	21	10
NDA totals			102	90	145	235	85	2	0	2	2	6
