= Dave Pichette =

Canadian ice hockey player

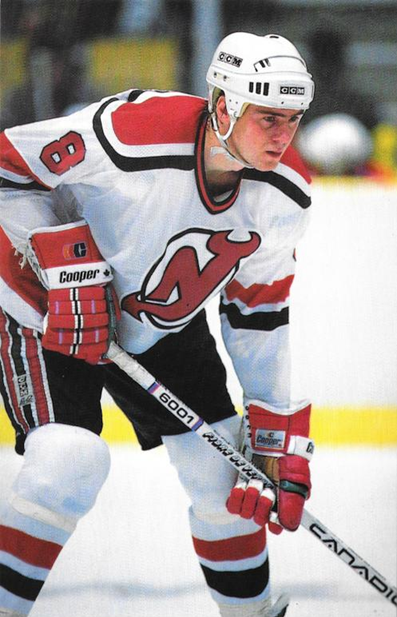
- Born: February 4, 1960 (age 66) Grand Falls, Newfoundland, Canada
- Height: 6 ft 3 in (191 cm)
- Weight: 190 lb (86 kg; 13 st 8 lb)
- Position: Defence
- Shot: Left
- Played for: Quebec Nordiques; St. Louis Blues; New Jersey Devils; New York Rangers
- NHL draft: Undrafted
- Playing career: 1980–1990

Dave Pichette (born February 4, 1960) is a Canadian former professional ice hockey player who played 322 games in the National Hockey League. He played with the Quebec Nordiques, St. Louis Blues, New Jersey Devils, and New York Rangers. As a youth, he played in the 1972 and 1973 Quebec International Pee-Wee Hockey Tournaments with a minor ice hockey team from Sainte-Foy, Quebec City.

== Career statistics ==
			Regular season					Playoffs
Season	Team	League	GP	G	A	Pts	PIM	GP	G	A	Pts	PIM
1978–79	Quebec Remparts	QMJHL	57	10	16	26	134	—	—	—	—	—
1979–80	Quebec Remparts	QMJHL	56	8	19	27	129	—	—	—	—	—
1980–81	Hershey Bears	AHL	20	2	3	5	37	—	—	—	—	—
1980–81	Quebec Nordiques	NHL	46	4	16	20	62	1	0	0	0	14
1981–82	Quebec Nordiques	NHL	67	7	30	37	152	16	2	4	6	22
1982–83	Fredericton Express	AHL	16	3	11	14	14	—	—	—	—	—
1982–83	Quebec Nordiques	NHL	53	3	21	24	49	2	0	1	1	0
1983–84	Fredericton Express	AHL	10	2	1	3	13	—	—	—	—	—
1983–84	Quebec Nordiques	NHL	23	2	7	9	12	—	—	—	—	—
1983–84	St. Louis Blues	NHL	23	0	11	11	6	9	1	2	3	18
1984–85	New Jersey Devils	NHL	71	17	40	57	41	—	—	—	—	—
1985–86	Maine Mariners	AHL	25	4	15	19	28	—	—	—	—	—
1985–86	New Jersey Devils	NHL	33	7	12	19	22	—	—	—	—	—
1986–87	Maine Mariners	AHL	61	6	16	22	69	—	—	—	—	—
1987–88	New Haven Nighthawks	AHL	46	10	21	31	37	—	—	—	—	—
1987–88	New York Rangers	NHL	6	1	3	4	4	—	—	—	—	—
1988–89	Krefelder EV 1981	2.GBun	15	3	15	18	48	—	—	—	—	—
1988–89	Cape Breton Oilers	AHL	39	5	21	26	20	—	—	—	—	—
1989–90	Halifax Citadels	AHL	58	3	18	21	65	—	—	—	—	—
NHL totals			322	41	140	181	348	28	3	7	10	54
