= Maxime Sauvé =

French-born Canadian ice hockey player (born 1990)

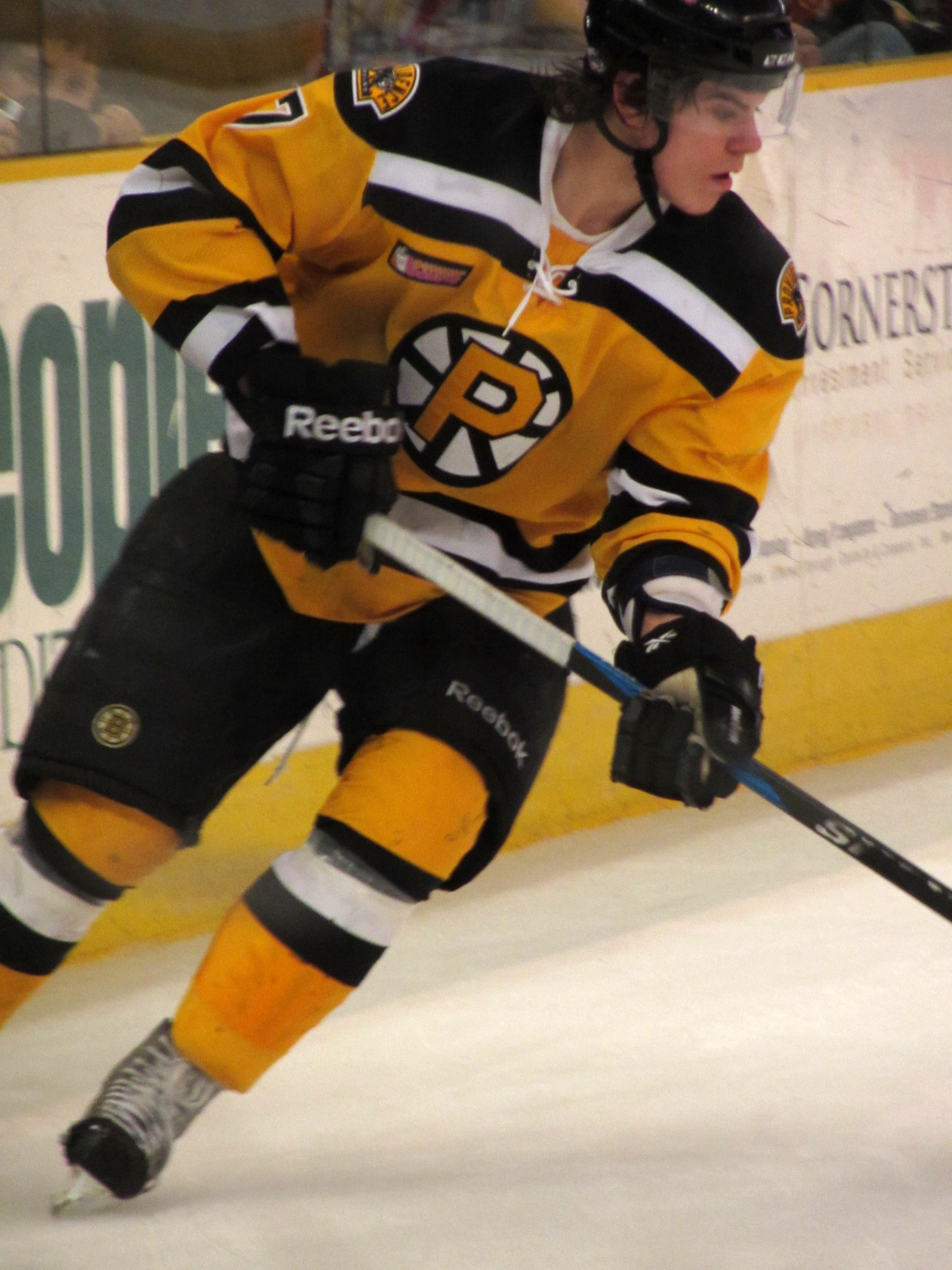
- Sauvé with the Providence Bruins in 2012
- Born: January 30, 1990 (age 36) Tours, France
- Height: 6 ft 2 in (188 cm)
- Weight: 195 lb (88 kg; 13 st 13 lb)
- Position: Left wing
- Shot: Left
- Played for: Boston Bruins; Kölner Haie; Boxers de Bordeaux
- NHL draft: 47th overall, 2008; Boston Bruins
- Playing career: 2010–2019

Maxime Sauvé (born January 30, 1990) is a French-born Canadian former professional ice hockey player. He was selected by the Boston Bruins in the 2nd round (47th overall) of the 2008 NHL entry draft and played one game in the National Hockey League for the Bruins during the 2011–12 season.

== Early life ==
Sauvé was born in Tours, France, but grew up in Boisbriand, Quebec. As a youth, he played in the 2003 Quebec International Pee-Wee Hockey Tournament with a minor ice hockey team from the Mille-Îles area of Laval, Quebec.

Sauve is the son of former NHL player Jean-François Sauvé, nephew of Bob Sauve and the cousin of Philippe Sauvé.

== Playing career ==
Sauvé played major junior hockey in the Quebec Major Junior Hockey League (QMJHL) from 2006–07 to 2009–10, collecting 76 goals and 116 assists for 192 points in 219 games.

On March 11, 2012, Sauvé made his NHL debut skating seven shifts (3:43 total ice time) with the Boston Bruins in a 5–2 away game loss to the Pittsburgh Penguins. Sauvé became the fifth France born player to play a game in the NHL along with Antoine Roussel, Cristobal Huet, Philippe Bozon and Stéphane Da Costa.

On April 3, 2013, Sauvé was traded by the Bruins to the Chicago Blackhawks in exchange for forward Rob Flick.

After spending the duration of the 2013–14 season on an AHL contract with the Norfolk Admirals, Sauvé opted to pursue a career abroad in signing a one-year contract with German club, Kölner Haie of the Deutsche Eishockey Liga on October 1, 2014. Sauve struggled in his first season abroad, suffering injury he appeared in just 27 games and contributed with 9 points in the 2014–15 campaign. He was not offered a new contract to remain with the Sharks.

In the 2015–16 season, Sauve earned a new contract in the AHL and signed a one-year-contract with the Hershey Bears. He was assigned to ECHL affiliate, the South Carolina Stingrays, appearing in just 10 games for the year.

== Career statistics ==
=== Regular season and playoffs ===
			Regular season					Playoffs
Season	Team	League	GP	G	A	Pts	PIM	GP	G	A	Pts	PIM
2005–06	Laurentides Vikings	QMAAA	41	16	30	46	54	5	1	3	4	2
2006–07	Quebec Remparts	QMJHL	60	10	6	16	24	2	0	0	0	2
2007–08	Quebec Remparts	QMJHL	38	12	20	32	22	—	—	—	—	—
2007–08	Val d'Or Foreurs	QMJHL	32	14	19	33	8	4	2	3	5	2
2008–09	Val d'Or Foreurs	QMJHL	64	27	49	76	43	—	—	—	—	—
2009–10	Val d'Or Foreurs	QMJHL	25	13	22	35	26	6	5	2	7	2
2009–10	Providence Bruins	AHL	6	2	0	2	2	—	—	—	—	—
2010–11	Providence Bruins	AHL	61	21	17	38	36	—	—	—	—	—
2011–12	Providence Bruins	AHL	39	11	15	26	40	—	—	—	—	—
2011–12	Boston Bruins	NHL	1	0	0	0	0	—	—	—	—	—
2012–13	Providence Bruins	AHL	52	10	13	23	24	—	—	—	—	—
2012–13	Rockford IceHogs	AHL	8	1	2	3	4	—	—	—	—	—
2013–14	Norfolk Admirals	AHL	47	6	8	14	19	7	2	0	2	4
2014–15	Kölner Haie	DEL	27	3	6	9	24	—	—	—	—	—
2015–16	South Carolina Stingrays	ECHL	10	1	4	5	2	—	—	—	—	—
2016–17	Jonquière Marquis	LNAH	6	1	2	3	4	—	—	—	—	—
2017–18	Boxers de Bordeaux	FRA	40	15	32	47	10	11	3	8	11	8
2018–19	Boxers de Bordeaux	FRA	12	2	8	10	4	—	—	—	—	—
NHL totals			1	0	0	0	0	—	—	—	—	—

=== International ===
Year	Team	Event	Result	GP	G	A	Pts	PIM
2008	Canada	WJC18	1st place, gold medalist(s)	7	0	6	6	2
Junior totals				7	0	6	6	2
