= Normand Aubin =

Canadian ice hockey player

- Born: July 26, 1960 (age 65) Saint-Leonard, Quebec, Canada
- Height: 6 ft 0 in (183 cm)
- Weight: 185 lb (84 kg; 13 st 3 lb)
- Position: Centre
- Shot: Left
- Played for: Toronto Maple Leafs
- NHL draft: 51st overall, 1979; Toronto Maple Leafs
- Playing career: 1980–1985

Normand Aubin (born July 26, 1960) is a Canadian former professional ice hockey centre who played two seasons in the National Hockey League for the Toronto Maple Leafs from 1981 to 1983.

Aubin was drafted 51st overall in the 1979 NHL entry draft by the Maple Leafs. Aubin played 69 career NHL games scoring eighteen goals and thirteen assists for thirty-one points. He played one playoff game without scoring a point.

== Career statistics ==
=== Regular season and playoffs ===
			Regular season					Playoffs
Season	Team	League	GP	G	A	Pts	PIM	GP	G	A	Pts	PIM
1976–77	Sorel Éperviers	QMJHL	50	25	26	51	32	—	—	—	—	—
1977–78	Verdun Éperviers	QMJHL	71	62	73	135	107	4	1	2	3	2
1978–79	Verdun Éperviers	QMJHL	70	80	69	149	84	11	14	11	25	8
1979–80	Verdun/Sorel Éperviers	QMJHL	21	41	29	70	28	—	—	—	—	—
1979–80	Sherbrooke Castors	QMJHL	42	50	60	110	38	14	15	16	31	24
1980–81	New Brunswick Hawks	AHL	79	43	46	89	99	13	5	6	11	34
1981–82	Toronto Maple Leafs	NHL	43	14	12	26	22	—	—	—	—	—
1981–82	Cincinnati Tigers	CHL	31	15	17	32	36	—	—	—	—	—
1982–83	Toronto Maple Leafs	NHL	26	4	1	5	8	1	0	0	0	0
1982–83	St. Catharines Saints	AHL	49	31	26	57	40	—	—	—	—	—
1983–84	St. Catharines Saints	AHL	80	47	47	94	63	7	5	3	8	8
1984–85	Nova Scotia Oilers	AHL	48	23	26	49	26	6	2	5	7	8
1999–00	Sorel Royaux	QSPHL	3	0	0	0	0	—	—	—	—	—
AHL totals			256	144	145	289	228	26	12	14	26	50
NHL totals			69	18	13	31	30	1	0	0	0	0
