= Philippe Sauvé =

American ice hockey player (born 1980)

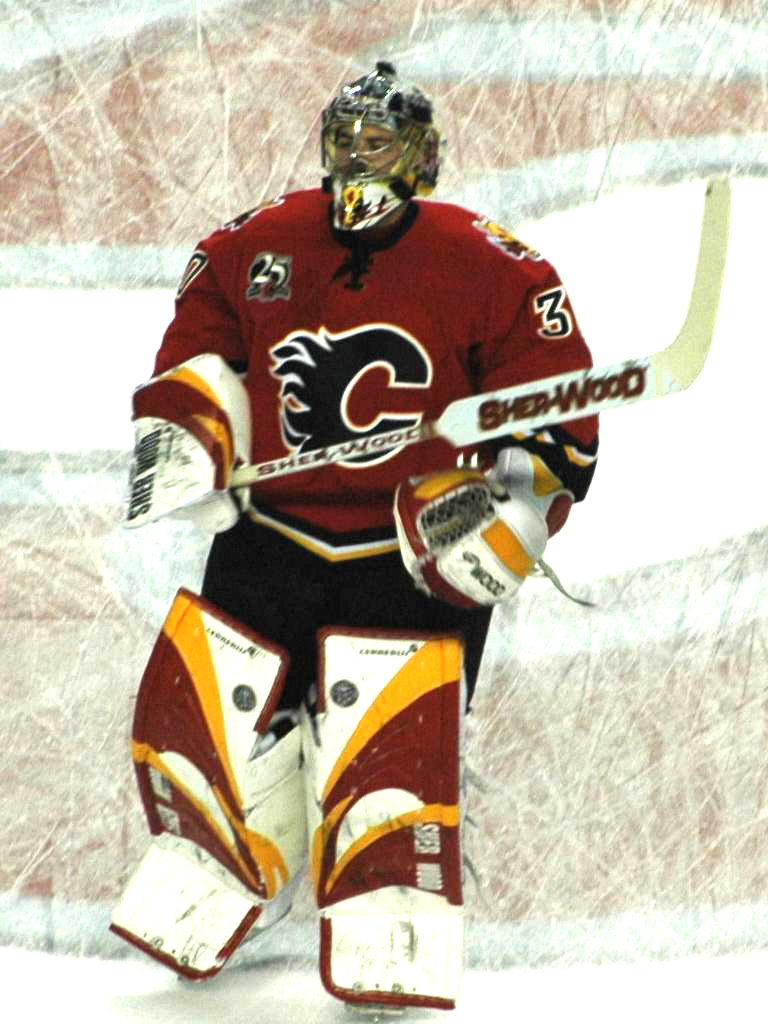
- Sauvé with the Calgary Flames in 2005
- Born: February 27, 1980 (age 46) Buffalo, New York, U.S.
- Height: 6 ft 0 in (183 cm)
- Weight: 175 lb (79 kg; 12 st 7 lb)
- Position: Goaltender
- Caught: Left
- Played for: Colorado Avalanche; Calgary Flames; Phoenix Coyotes; Boston Bruins; Hamburg Freezers
- NHL draft: 38th overall, 1998; Colorado Avalanche
- Playing career: 2000–2008

Philippe Sauvé (born February 27, 1980) is an American former professional ice hockey goaltender who last played with the Hamburg Freezers of the Deutsche Eishockey Liga. Sauvé played in the National Hockey League (NHL) for the Colorado Avalanche, Calgary Flames, Phoenix Coyotes and the Boston Bruins.

== Playing career ==
As a youth, Sauvé played in the 1993 and 1994 Quebec International Pee-Wee Hockey Tournaments with a minor ice hockey team from the Mille-Îles neighbourhood of Laval, Quebec.

Sauvé was drafted in round 2, 38th overall, by the Colorado Avalanche in the 1998 NHL entry draft, where he would serve as the backup goaltender and play in 17 games for the Avalanche before being traded on August 8, 2005, to the Calgary Flames for a conditional 7th-round draft pick. In the 2005–06 season, after a 7–4 defeat to the Colorado Avalanche, he had a fight with former teammate David Aebischer on January 24, 2006.

On February 1, 2006, he was traded to the Phoenix Coyotes with Steven Reinprecht for Brian Boucher and Mike Leclerc. After playing only 5 games with the Coyotes, Sauvé was then traded to the Boston Bruins for Tyler Redenbach on November 14, 2006.

Sauvé played just 2 games with the Boston Bruins before being demoted to the American Hockey League (AHL). The following year for the 2007–08 season, he signed a contract with the Iowa Stars of the AHL before leaving for the DEL's Hamburg Freezers on January 21, 2008.

He portrayed Boston Bruins goaltender Sugar Jim Henry in the 2005 Quebec film The Rocket (Maurice Richard) based on the life on Maurice Richard. The famous handshake photo of Richard and Henry was recreated in the film with Sauvé as Henry and Roy Dupuis as Richard.

== Family ==
He is the son of former NHL goaltender Bob Sauvé and was born in Buffalo, New York while his father was playing for the Buffalo Sabres. He is also the nephew of Jean-François Sauvé and the cousin of Jean-Francois' son, Maxime Sauvé.

== Regular season and playoffs ==
			Regular season										Playoffs
Season	Team	League	GP	W	L	T	OTL	MIN	GA	SO	GAA	SV%	GP	W	L	MIN	GA	SO	GAA	SV%
1996–97	Rimouski Océanic	QMJHL	26	11	9	2	—	1332	84	0	3.78	.891	1	0	0	14	3	0	12.90	—
1997–98	Rimouski Océanic	QMJHL	40	23	16	0	—	2326	131	1	3.38	.899	7	0	5	262	33	0	7.55	—
1998–99	Rimouski Océanic	QMJHL	44	16	19	4	—	2401	155	0	3.87	.892	11	6	4	595	30	1	3.03	.926
1999–00	Drummondville Voltigeurs	QMJHL	28	12	12	2	—	1526	106	0	4.17	.864	—	—	—	—	—	—	—	—
1999–00	Hull Olympiques	QMJHL	17	9	7	1	—	992	57	0	3.45	.903	12	6	6	735	47	0	3.84	.890
2000–01	Hershey Bears	AHL	42	17	18	1	—	2182	100	3	2.75	.914	3	0	3	218	10	0	2.75	.900
2001–02	Hershey Bears	AHL	55	25	20	6	—	3130	111	6	2.13	.928	8	3	5	486	21	0	2.59	.915
2002–03	Hershey Bears	AHL	60	26	20	12	—	3394	134	5	2.37	.917	5	2	3	295	14	0	2.84	.914
2003–04	Colorado Avalanche	NHL	17	7	7	3	—	986	50	0	3.04	.896	—	—	—	—	—	—	—	—
2003–04	Hershey Bears	AHL	10	3	7	0	—	578	25	2	2.59	.910	—	—	—	—	—	—	—	—
2004–05	Mississippi Sea Wolves	ECHL	21	13	4	4	—	1298	56	2	2.59	.923	4	1	3	227	16	0	4.23	.904
2005–06	Calgary Flames	NHL	8	3	3	—	0	402	22	0	3.28	.891	—	—	—	—	—	—	—	—
2005–06	Phoenix Coyotes	NHL	5	0	4	—	0	187	17	0	5.45	.867	—	—	—	—	—	—	—	—
2006–07	San Antonio Rampage	AHL	10	4	5	—	0	536	34	0	3.80	.883	—	—	—	—	—	—	—	—
2006–07	Providence Bruins	AHL	23	10	11	—	1	1292	61	1	2.83	.890	—	—	—	—	—	—	—	—
2006–07	Boston Bruins	NHL	2	0	0	—	0	41	4	0	5.85	.826	—	—	—	—	—	—	—	—
2006–07	Hamilton Bulldogs	AHL	6	2	3	—	0	325	13	1	2.40	.916	—	—	—	—	—	—	—	—
2007–08	Iowa Stars	AHL	12	5	5	—	0	550	39	0	4.25	.855	—	—	—	—	—	—	—	—
2007–08	Hamburg Freezers	DEL	13	9	4	—	0	783	38	0	2.91	.905	7	3	4	382	30	0	4.71	.819
NHL totals			32	10	14	3	0	1616	93	0	3.45	.888	—	—	—	—	—	—	—	—

=== International ===
Year	Team	Event	GP	W	L	T	MIN	GA	SO	GAA	SV%
2000	United States	WJC	2	0	1	1	120	5	0	2.51	.924
Junior totals			2	0	1	1	120	5	0	2.51	.924

== Awards and honours ==
Award	Year
QMJHL
Humanitarian player of the year	1999
CHL Humanitarian player of the year	1999
NHL
YoungStars Game MVP	2004

== See also ==
- Notable families in the NHL
