= Trois-Rivières Draveurs =

Canadian junior ice hockey team

- City: Trois-Rivières, Quebec
- League: Quebec Major Junior Hockey League
- Operated: 1969 to 1992
- Home arena: Colisée de Trois-Rivières

Franchise history
- 1969–1973: Trois-Rivières Ducs
- 1973–1992: Trois-Rivières Draveurs
- 1992–1998: Sherbrooke Faucons
- 1998–2003: Sherbrooke Castors
- 2003–2011: Lewiston Maineiacs

The Trois-Rivières Draveurs ("Raftmen") were a Canadian junior ice hockey team playing in the Quebec Major Junior Hockey League (QMJHL). They played home games at the Colisée de Trois-Rivières, in Trois-Rivières, Quebec. The team was originally known as the Trois-Rivières Ducs ("Dukes") and were a founding member of the QMJHL in 1969. They were renamed the Draveurs in 1973.

== History ==
The Draveurs finished first place in the QMJHL in 1977–78 with 101 points, and again in 1978–79 with 122 points. Those two seasons, Trois-Rivières won consecutive President's Cups. The Draveurs were also league finalists in 1980–81, 1981–82, and 1991–92, during the final season in Trois-Rivières.

During the 1991–92 season, Manon Rhéaume was a goaltender for the Draveurs and became the first female to play in the Canadian Hockey League.

The team moved to Sherbrooke, in 1992, where they were renamed the Sherbrooke Faucons, and later, the Sherbrooke Castors. They moved again in 2003 to become the Lewiston Maineiacs only to fold in 2011.

== Notable coaches ==
- Jean Bégin
- Michel Bergeron
- Alain Vigneault

== Notable players ==
- Luc Tardif (later president of the International Ice Hockey Federation)

=== NHL alumni ===
List of Trois-Rivières players who also played in the National Hockey League (NHL).

- Pierre Aubry
- Joel Baillargeon
- Ray Bourque
- Francois Breault
- Paul Brousseau
- Eric Charron
- Enrico Ciccone
- Jacques Cloutier
- Roland Cloutier
- Alain Daigle
- Richard David
- Martin Desjardins
- André Doré
- Donald Dufresne
- Benoit Gosselin
- Gilles Hamel
- Denis Herron
- Jean-François Labbé
- Pierre Lacroix
- Claude Lapointe
- Steve Larouche
- Alain Lemieux
- Claude Lemieux
- Eric Messier
- Bob Mongrain
- Yanic Perreault
- Michel Picard
- Alain Raymond
- Pascal Rheaume
- Normand Rochefort
- Dominic Roussel
- Yves Sarault
- Jean-François Sauvé
- Martin St. Amour
- Christian Tanguay
- Jocelyn Thibault
- Brent Tremblay
- Pascal Trepanier
- Claude Verret
- Alain Vigneault
