= 1987–88 Nationale 1A season =

French professional ice hockey season

The 1987–88 Nationale 1A season was the 67th season of the Nationale 1A, the top level of ice hockey in France. 10 teams participated in the league, and Mont-Blanc HC won their second league title. Chamonix Hockey Club was relegated to the Nationale 1B.

== First round ==
	Club	GP	W	T	L	GF	GA	Pts
1.	Mont-Blanc HC	18	15	1	2	107	55	31
2.	Ours de Villard-de-Lans	18	12	0	6	116	80	24
3.	Diables Rouges de Briançon	18	9	4	5	79	58	22
4.	Dragons de Rouen	18	9	3	6	104	96	21
5.	Français Volants	18	9	1	8	109	81	19
6.	Gap Hockey Club	18	9	0	9	76	80	18
7.	Chamonix Hockey Club	18	7	1	10	68	89	15
8.	HC Amiens Somme	18	7	1	10	81	104	15
9.	ASG Tours	18	5	3	10	65	93	13
10.	CSG Grenoble	18	1	0	17	70	139	2

== Final round ==
	Club	GP	W	T	L	GF	GA	Pts
1.	Mont-Blanc HC	10	5	5	0	49	26	15
2.	Diables Rouges de Briançon	10	5	2	3	58	33	12
3.	Gap Hockey Club	10	4	3	3	41	40	11
4.	Ours de Villard-de-Lans	10	4	1	5	39	51	9
5.	Français Volants	10	2	4	4	40	46	8
6.	Dragons de Rouen	10	2	1	7	40	71	5

== Playoffs ==
Semi-finals
Gap Hockey Club	0
Diables Rouges de Briançon	2
Ours de Villard-de-Lans	0
Mont-Blanc HC	2

Final
Diables Rouges de Briançon	0
Mont-Blanc HC	2
Third place
Ours de Villard-de-Lans	1
Gap Hockey Club	2

== Relegation round ==
	Club	GP	W	T	L	GF	GA	Pts
7.	HC Amiens Somme	12	7	3	2	74	59	32
8.	ASG Tours	12	6	2	4	60	48	27
9.	CSG Grenoble	12	7	1	4	75	64	17
10.	Chamonix Hockey Club	12	1	0	11	42	80	17
