= 1979–80 QMJHL season =

Canadian junior ice hockey season

The 1979–80 QMJHL season was the 11th season in the history of the Quebec Major Junior Hockey League. Ten teams played 72 games each in the schedule. The Sherbrooke Castors finished first overall in the regular season, winning the Jean Rougeau Trophy. The Cornwall Royals, led by rookie Dale Hawerchuk won the President's Cup, defeating the Sherbrooke Castors in the finals. Cornwall went on to win the 1980 Memorial Cup, winning their second Memorial Cup championship.

== Team changes ==
- The Laval National are renamed the Laval Voisins.
- The Verdun Éperviers return to Sorel, Quebec, mid-season.

== Final standings ==
Note: GP = Games played; W = Wins; L = Losses; T = Ties; Pts = Points; GF = Goals for; GA = Goals against

| Dilio Division | GP | W | L | T | Pts | GF | GA |
|---|---|---|---|---|---|---|---|
| Sherbrooke Castors | 72 | 45 | 20 | 7 | 97 | 435 | 314 |
| Chicoutimi Saguenéens | 72 | 42 | 27 | 3 | 87 | 442 | 347 |
| Quebec Remparts | 72 | 38 | 29 | 5 | 81 | 348 | 331 |
| Trois-Rivières Draveurs | 72 | 36 | 27 | 9 | 81 | 426 | 327 |
| Shawinigan Cataractes | 72 | 28 | 35 | 9 | 65 | 314 | 339 |

| Lebel Division | GP | W | L | T | Pts | GF | GA |
|---|---|---|---|---|---|---|---|
| Cornwall Royals | 72 | 41 | 25 | 6 | 88 | 388 | 333 |
| Montreal Juniors | 72 | 39 | 30 | 3 | 81 | 406 | 387 |
| Hull Olympiques | 72 | 25 | 35 | 12 | 62 | 336 | 378 |
| Verdun/Sorel Éperviers | 72 | 20 | 47 | 5 | 45 | 321 | 426 |
| Laval Voisins | 72 | 13 | 52 | 7 | 33 | 265 | 499 |

- complete list of standings.

== Scoring leaders ==
Note: GP = Games played; G = Goals; A = Assists; Pts = Points; PIM = Penalties in minutes

| Player | Team | GP | G | A | Pts | PIM |
|---|---|---|---|---|---|---|
| J. F. Sauve | Trois-Rivières Draveurs | 72 | 63 | 124 | 187 | 31 |
| Guy Carbonneau | Chicoutimi Saguenéens | 72 | 72 | 110 | 182 | 66 |
| Denis Savard | Montreal Juniors | 72 | 63 | 118 | 181 | 93 |
| Normand Aubin | Verdun/Sorel/Sherbrooke | 63 | 91 | 89 | 180 | 66 |
| Gilles Hamel | Trois-Rivières/Chicoutimi | 70 | 86 | 70 | 156 | 95 |
| Alain Bouchard | Verdun/Sorel/Montreal | 70 | 53 | 94 | 147 | 27 |
| Pierre Aubry | Trois-Rivières Draveurs | 72 | 85 | 62 | 147 | 82 |
| Denis Cyr | Montreal Juniors | 70 | 70 | 76 | 146 | 61 |
| Alain Lemieux | Chicoutimi Saguenéens | 72 | 47 | 95 | 142 | 36 |
| Louis Begin | Sherbrooke Castors | 70 | 60 | 73 | 133 | 54 |

- complete scoring statistics

== Playoffs ==
Dale Hawerchuk was the leading scorer of the playoffs with 45 points (20 goals, 25 assists).

Quarterfinals

- Sherbrooke Castors defeated Hull Olympiques 4 games to 0.
- Cornwall Royals defeated Shawinigan Cataractes 4 games to 3.
- Chicoutimi Saguenéens defeated Trois-Rivières Draveurs 4 games to 3.
- Montreal Juniors defeated Quebec Remparts 4 games to 1.

Semifinals

- Sherbrooke Castors defeated Montreal Juniors 4 games to 1.
- Cornwall Royals defeated Chicoutimi Saguenéens 4 games to 1.

Finals

- Cornwall Royals defeated Sherbrooke Castors 4 games to 2.

== All-star teams ==
First team

- Goaltender - Paul Pageau, Shawinigan Cataractes
- Left defence - Fred Arthur, Cornwall Royals
- Right defence - Gaston Therrien, Quebec Remparts
- Left winger - Gilles Hamel, Chicoutimi Saguenéens
- Centreman - J. F. Sauve, Trois-Rivières Draveurs & Denis Savard, Montreal Juniors
- Right winger - Denis Cyr, Montreal Juniors
- Coach - Doug Carpenter, Cornwall Royals

Second team

- Goaltender - Corrado Micalef, Sherbrooke Castors
- Left defence - Normand Rochefort, Trois-Rivières Draveurs
- Right defence - Dave Ezard, Cornwall Royals
- Left winger - Pierre Aubry, Trois-Rivières Draveurs & Louis Begin, Sherbrooke Castors
- Centreman - Guy Carbonneau, Chicoutimi Saguenéens
- Right winger - Brian Johnson, Sherbrooke Castors
- Coach - Ghislain Delage, Sherbrooke Castors & Gaston Drapeau, Quebec Remparts
- List of First/Second/Rookie team all-stars.

== Trophies and awards ==
Team

- President's Cup - Playoff Champions, Cornwall Royals.
- Jean Rougeau Trophy - Regular Season Champions, Sherbrooke Castors.
- Robert Lebel Trophy - Team with best GAA, Sherbrooke Castors.

Player

- Michel Brière Memorial Trophy - Most Valuable Player, Denis Savard, Montreal Juniors.
- Jean Béliveau Trophy - Top Scorer, J. F. Sauve, Trois-Rivières Draveurs.
- Guy Lafleur Trophy - Playoff MVP, Dale Hawerchuk, Cornwall Royals.
- Jacques Plante Memorial Trophy - Best GAA, Corrado Micalef, Sherbrooke Castors.
- Emile Bouchard Trophy - Defenceman of the Year, Gaston Therrien, Quebec Remparts.
- Michel Bergeron Trophy - Rookie of the Year, Dale Hawerchuk, Cornwall Royals .
- Frank J. Selke Memorial Trophy - Most sportsmanlike player, J. F. Sauve, Trois-Rivières Draveurs.

== See also ==
- 1980 Memorial Cup
- 1980 NHL entry draft
- 1979–80 OMJHL season
- 1979–80 WHL season

| Preceded by 1978–79 QMJHL season | QMJHL seasons | Succeeded by 1980–81 QMJHL season |
