= Sherbrooke Castors =

- City: Sherbrooke, Quebec
- League: QMJHL
- Operated: 1969 to 1982 & 1998 to 2003
- Home arena: Palais des Sports

Franchise history
- 1969–1973: Trois-Rivières Ducs
- 1973–1992: Trois-Rivières Draveurs
- 1992–1998: Sherbrooke Faucons
- 1998–2003: Sherbrooke Castors
- 2003–2011: Lewiston Maineiacs

Previous franchise history
- 1962–1969: Thetford Mines Canadiens
- 1969–1982: Sherbrooke Castors
- 1982–1989: Saint-Jean Castors
- 1989–1995: Saint-Jean Lynx
- 1995–present: Rimouski Océanic

The Sherbrooke Castors or Beavers (in English) was the name of two different junior ice hockey teams in the Quebec Major Junior Hockey League and another team in the Quebec Eastern Provincial Hockey League. Both later franchises played at the Palais des Sports in Sherbrooke, Quebec, Canada.

== Earlier Castors ==
The earlier Sherbrooke Beavers were a senior ice hockey team which won the 1965 Allan Cup, and previously played in the Quebec Eastern Provincial Hockey League, an amateur league and team from 1959 to 1962.

== Original Castors ==
The Sherbrooke Castors (1969-1982) moved to Saint-Jean-sur-Richelieu, Quebec in 1982, named the Saint-Jean Castors. In 1989 they were renamed the Saint-Jean Lynx. In 1995 the team moved to Rimouski, Quebec to become the Rimouski Océanic.

This original Castors franchise won the President's Cup in 1975, 1977 and 1982. The second incarnation never won. The Castors played in the Memorial Cup in those three years, and came closest to winning in 1982, when they lost in the tournament final to the Kitchener Rangers.

On November 24, 1974 on the way to a game in Chicoutimi; the team's bus was involved in an accident that killed Gaétan Paradis, and injured 30 more.

== Sherbrooke Faucons/Castors ==
The second Sherbrooke Castors team (1998-2003), originally the Trois-Rivières Draveurs, franchise moved to Sherbrooke in 1992 as the Sherbrooke Faucons ("Falcons"). The Faucons were renamed to Castors in 1998 and moved to Lewiston, Maine in 2003, to be renamed the Lewiston Maineiacs. The Maineiacs folded in 2011, and the City of Sherbrooke received an expansion franchise in 2012 in the form of the Sherbrooke Phoenix.

== NHL alumni ==
The following Castors/Faucons later played in the National Hockey League:

- Dmitry Afanasenkov
- Norm Aubin
- Alain Belanger
- Yves Bélanger
- Serge Boisvert
- Paul Boutilier
- Fred Burchell
- Claude Cardin
- Ron Carter
- John Chabot
- Dan Chicoine
- Rejean Cloutier
- Jean Cusson
- Claude Cyr
- Mathieu Dandenault
- Gord Donnelly
- Gilles Dube
- Norm Dube
- Norm Dussault
- Jean-Francois Fortin
- Ray Fortin
- Gerard Gallant
- Jean-Marc Gaulin
- Jere Gillis
- Alan Haworth
- Pierre Jarry
- Brian Johnson
- Claude Larose
- Fern LeBlanc
- Rejean Lemelin
- Jean Lemieux
- Mario Lessard
- Gilles Lupien
- Drew MacIntyre
- Jimmy Mann
- Peter Marsh
- Sean McKenna
- Corrado Micalef
- Richard Mulhern
- Simon Nolet
- Michel Petit
- Noel Picard
- Roger Picard
- Pascal Rheaume
- Dany Sabourin
- Richard Sévigny
- Bobby Simpson
- Claude St. Sauveur
- Radoslav Suchy
- Jocelyn Thibault
- Rick Vaive
- Sid Veysey
- Kurt Walker
