= 1988–89 Nationale 1A season =

French professional ice hockey season

The 1988–89 Nationale 1A season was the 68th season of the Nationale 1A, the top level of ice hockey in France. 10 teams participated in the league, and Français Volants won their third league title. Bordeaux Gironde Hockey 2000 was relegated to the Nationale 1B.

== First round ==
| | Club | GP | W | T | L | GF | GA | Pts |
|---|---|---|---|---|---|---|---|---|
| 1. | Français Volants | 18 | 12 | 2 | 4 | 103 | 62 | 26 |
| 2. | Dragons de Rouen | 18 | 10 | 5 | 3 | 98 | 74 | 25 |
| 3. | Diables Rouges de Briançon | 18 | 10 | 4 | 4 | 103 | 50 | 24 |
| 4. | HC Amiens Somme | 18 | 10 | 3 | 5 | 95 | 82 | 23 |
| 5. | CSG Grenoble | 18 | 8 | 2 | 8 | 87 | 64 | 18 |
| 6. | Ours de Villard-de-Lans | 18 | 7 | 3 | 8 | 71 | 89 | 17 |
| 7. | ASG Tours | 18 | 7 | 2 | 9 | 68 | 96 | 16 |
| 8. | Bordeaux Gironde Hockey 2000 | 18 | 6 | 1 | 11 | 70 | 94 | 13 |
| 9. | Mont-Blanc HC | 18 | 5 | 2 | 11 | 61 | 86 | 12 |
| 10. | Gap Hockey Club | 18 | 1 | 4 | 13 | 61 | 120 | 6 |

== Final round ==
| | Club | GP | W | T | L | GF | GA | Pts |
|---|---|---|---|---|---|---|---|---|
| 1. | Dragons de Rouen | 20 | 15 | 2 | 3 | 134 | 75 | 32 |
| 2. | Français Volants | 20 | 13 | 2 | 5 | 117 | 78 | 28 |
| 3. | Diables Rouges de Briançon | 20 | 12 | 1 | 7 | 96 | 85 | 25 |
| 4. | HC Amiens Somme | 20 | 9 | 1 | 10 | 99 | 93 | 19 |
| 5. | CSG Grenoble | 20 | 5 | 1 | 14 | 57 | 100 | 11 |
| 6. | Ours de Villard-de-Lans | 20 | 2 | 1 | 17 | 70 | 142 | 5 |

== Playoffs ==
Semi-finals
HC Amiens Somme | 2
Dragons de Rouen | 1
Diables Rouges de Briançon | 1
Français Volants | 2

Final
HC Amiens Somme | 1
Français Volants | 2
Third place
Diables Rouges de Briançon | 0
Dragons de Rouen | 2

== Relegation round ==
| | Club | GP | W | T | L | GF | GA | Pts |
|---|---|---|---|---|---|---|---|---|
| 7. | Mont-Blanc HC | 12 | 7 | 0 | 5 | 58 | 44 | 26 |
| 8. | ASG Tours | 12 | 4 | 2 | 6 | 59 | 69 | 26 |
| 9. | Gap Hockey Club | 12 | 7 | 2 | 3 | 72 | 56 | 22 |
| 10. | Bordeaux Gironde Hockey 2000 | 12 | 4 | 0 | 8 | 50 | 70 | 21 |
