= 1985–86 IHL season =

North American ice hockey season

The 1985–86 IHL season was the 41st season of the International Hockey League, a North American minor professional league. 10 teams participated in the regular season, and the Muskegon Lumberjacks won the Turner Cup.

== Regular season ==
East Division	GP	W	L	T	OTL	GF	GA	Pts
Muskegon Lumberjacks	82	50	27	0	5	376	290	105
Kalamazoo Wings	82	47	29	0	6	341	310	100
Saginaw Generals	82	41	33	0	8	318	285	90
Toledo Goaldiggers	82	24	48	0	10	293	421	58
Flint Spirits	82	16	60	0	6	270	495	38

West Division	GP	W	L	T	OTL	GF	GA	Pts
Fort Wayne Komets	82	52	22	0	8	345	263	112
Milwaukee Admirals	82	48	28	1	5	368	306	102
Peoria Rivermen	82	46	31	0	5	338	297	97
Salt Lake Golden Eagles	82	44	36	0	2	340	325	90
Indianapolis Checkers	82	41	35	1	5	296	303	88

== Turner Cup-Playoffs ==
Turner-Cup-Quarterfinals
W1	Fort Wayne Komets	4
W4	Salt Lake Golden Eagles	1
W2	Milwaukee Admirals	1
W3	Peoria Rivermen	4
E1	Muskegon Lumberjacks	4
E4	Indianapolis Checkers	1
E2	Kalamazoo Wings	2
E3	Saginaw Generals	4

Turner-Cup-Semifinals
W1	Fort Wayne Komets	4
W3	Peoria Rivermen	2
E1	Muskegon Lumberjacks	4
E3	Saginaw Generals	1

Turner-Cup-Final
W1	Fort Wayne Komets	0
E1	Muskegon Lumberjacks	4
