= 1978–79 QMJHL season =

Canadian junior ice hockey season

Redesigned 10th anniversary logo.

The 1978–79 QMJHL season was the tenth season in the history of the Quebec Major Junior Hockey League. The QMJHL unveils a new logo for its tenth anniversary, using the letters of league's French acronym shaped as an ice skate. Ten teams played 72 games each in the schedule. The Trois-Rivières Draveurs finished first overall in the regular season winning their second consecutive Jean Rougeau Trophy, and defended their President's Cup title defeating the Sherbrooke Castors in the finals.

== Team changes ==
- The Shawinigan Dynamos are renamed the Shawinigan Cataractes.

== Final standings ==
Note: GP = Games played; W = Wins; L = Losses; T = Ties; Pts = Points; GF = Goals for; GA = Goals against

Dilio Division	GP	W	L	T	Pts	GF	GA
Trois-Rivières Draveurs	72	58	8	6	122	527	233
Sherbrooke Castors	72	45	21	6	96	406	291
Quebec Remparts	72	28	31	13	69	324	339
Chicoutimi Saguenéens	72	26	36	10	62	337	346
Shawinigan Cataractes	72	24	43	5	53	310	424

Lebel Division	GP	W	L	T	Pts	GF	GA
Verdun Éperviers	72	41	24	7	89	367	313
Montreal Juniors	72	39	25	8	86	384	291
Cornwall Royals	72	29	36	7	65	361	397
Laval National	72	22	43	7	51	316	469
Hull Olympiques	72	10	55	7	27	262	491

- complete list of standings.

== Scoring leaders ==
Note: GP = Games played; G = Goals; A = Assists; Pts = Points; PIM = Penalties in minutes

Player	Team	GP	G	A	Pts	PIM
J. F. Sauve	Trois-Rivières Draveurs	72	65	111	176	31
Denis Savard	Montreal Juniors	70	46	112	158	88
Normand Aubin	Verdun Éperviers	70	80	69	149	54
Bob Mongrain	Trois-Rivières Draveurs	72	66	76	142	55
Guy Carbonneau	Chicoutimi Saguenéens	72	62	79	141	47
Pierre Lacroix	Trois-Rivières Draveurs	72	37	100	137	57
Bob Crawford	Cornwall Royals	65	62	70	132	43
Louis Begin	Sherbrooke Castors	72	46	85	131	32
Denis Cyr	Montreal Juniors	72	70	56	126	61
Serge Boisvert	Sherbrooke Castors	72	50	72	122	45

- complete scoring statistics

== Playoffs ==
J. F. Sauve was the leading scorer of the playoffs with 38 points (19 goals, 19 assists).

Quarterfinals

- Trois-Rivières Draveurs defeated Shawinigan Cataractes 4 games to 0.
- Sherbrooke Castors defeated Chicoutimi Saguenéens 4 games to 0.
- Verdun Éperviers defeated Cornwall Royals 4 games to 3.
- Montreal Juniors defeated Quebec Remparts 4 games to 2.

Semifinals

- Trois-Rivières Draveurs defeated Montreal Juniors 4 games to 1.
- Sherbrooke Castors defeated Verdun Éperviers 4 games to 0.

Finals

- Trois-Rivières Draveurs defeated Sherbrooke Castors 4 games to 0.

== All-star teams ==
First team

- Goaltender - Jacques Cloutier, Trois-Rivières Draveurs
- Left defence - Pierre Lacroix, Trois-Rivières Draveurs
- Right defence - Ray Bourque, Verdun Éperviers
- Left winger - Louis Begin, Sherbrooke Castors
- Centreman - Normand Aubin, Verdun Éperviers
- Right winger - Jimmy Mann, Sherbrooke Castors
- Coach - Michel Bergeron, Trois-Rivières Draveurs

Second team

- Goaltender - Vincent Tremblay, Quebec Ramparts
- Left defence - Kevin Lowe, Quebec Remparts
- Right defence - Michel Leblanc, Trois-Rivières Draveurs
- Left winger - Gilles Hamel, Trois-Rivières Draveurs
- Centreman - J. F. Sauve, Trois-Rivières Draveurs
- Right winger - Denis Cyr, Montreal Juniors
- Coach - Ron Racette, Quebec Remparts
- List of First/Second/Rookie team all-stars.

== Trophies and awards ==
Team

- President's Cup - Playoff Champions, Trois-Rivières Draveurs.
- Jean Rougeau Trophy - Regular Season Champions, Trois-Rivières Draveurs.
- Robert Lebel Trophy - Team with best GAA, Trois-Rivières Draveurs.

Player

- Michel Brière Memorial Trophy - Most Valuable Player, Pierre Lacroix, Trois-Rivières Draveurs.
- Jean Béliveau Trophy - Top Scorer, J. F. Sauve, Trois-Rivières Draveurs.
- Guy Lafleur Trophy - Playoff MVP, J. F. Sauve, Trois-Rivières Draveurs.
- Jacques Plante Memorial Trophy - Best GAA, Jacques Cloutier, Trois-Rivières Draveurs.
- Emile Bouchard Trophy - Defenceman of the Year, Ray Bourque, Verdun Éperviers.
- Michel Bergeron Trophy - Rookie of the Year, Alain Grenier, Laval National .
- Frank J. Selke Memorial Trophy - Most sportsmanlike player, Ray Bourque, Verdun Éperviers, and J. F. Sauve, Trois-Rivières Draveurs.

== See also ==
- 1979 Memorial Cup
- 1979 NHL entry draft
- 1978–79 OMJHL season
- 1978–79 WHL season

Preceded by 1977–78 QMJHL season	QMJHL seasons	Succeeded by 1979–80 QMJHL season
