= Jean Savard =

Canadian ice hockey player

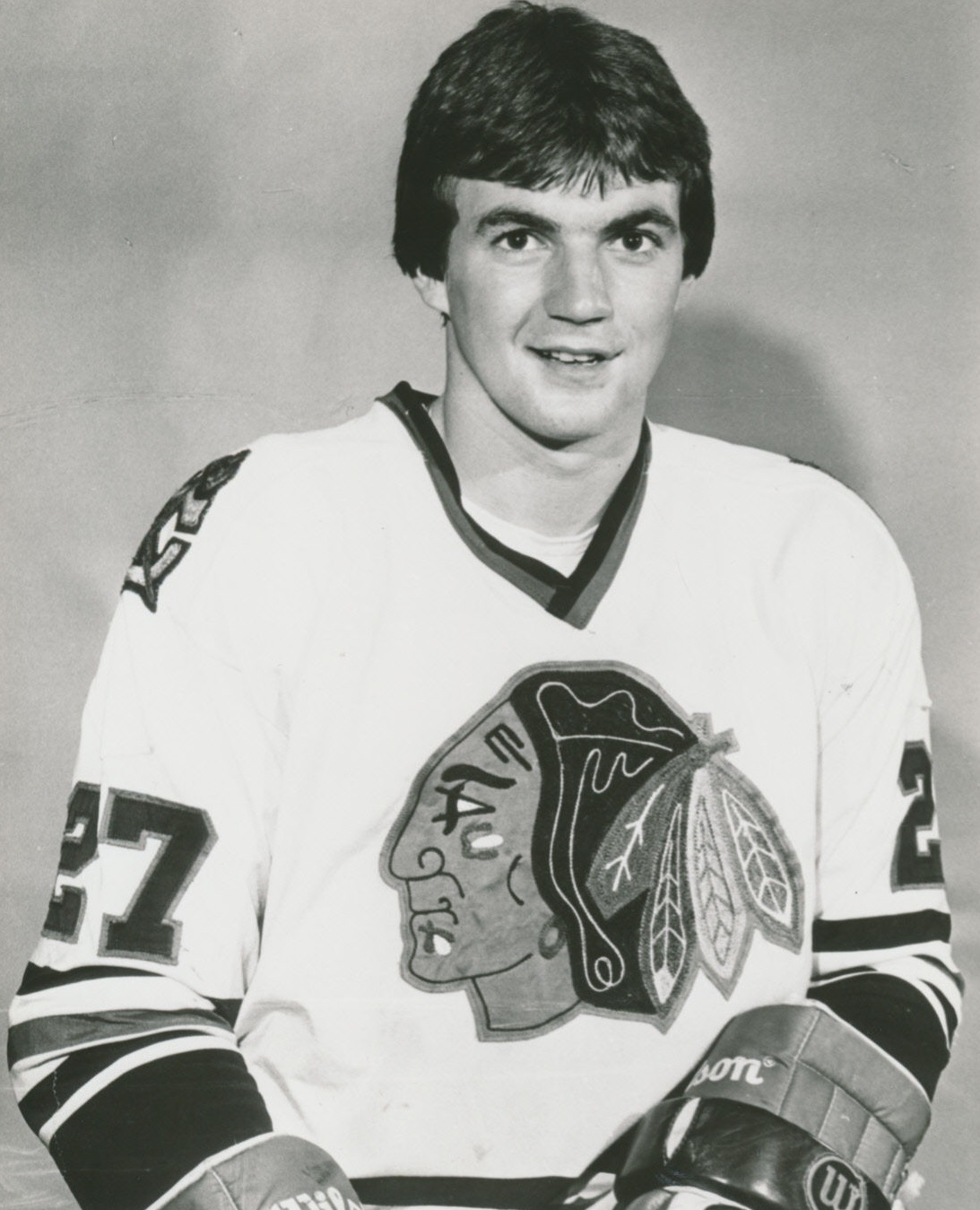
- Savard in 1977
- Born: April 26, 1957 (age 67); Verdun, Quebec, Canada
- Height: 5 ft 11 in (180 cm)
- Weight: 172 lb (78 kg; 12 st 4 lb)
- Position: Centre
- Shot: Right
- Played for: Chicago Black Hawks; Hartford Whalers; Zürcher SC
- NHL draft: 19th overall, 1977; Chicago Black Hawks
- WHA draft: 75th overall, 1977; Birmingham Bulls
- Playing career: 1977–1982

Jean Savard (born April 26, 1957) is a Canadian former professional ice hockey player. He played 43 games in the National Hockey League with the Chicago Black Hawks and Hartford Whalers between 1977 and 1980.

== Biography ==
Savard was born in Verdun, Quebec. As a youth, he played in the 1969 Quebec International Pee-Wee Hockey Tournament with a minor ice hockey team from Verdun. He placed junior hockey in the Quebec Major Junior Hockey League, winning the scoring championship in 1976–77. In 1977, Savard was drafted by both the National Hockey League and World Hockey Association. Savard signed with the Chicago Black Hawks of the NHL, and played 42 games with Chicago and its farm team, the Dallas Black Hawks. Savard was claimed by the Hartford Whalers in the expansion draft and played one further game in the NHL. Savard played his final full season with the Binghamton Whalers in 1980–81. Savard sat out the 1981–82 season after being released by the St. Louis Blues. He played a tryout in 1982–83 with the Salt Lake Golden Eagles before retiring.

== Career statistics ==
=== Regular season and playoffs ===
			Regular season					Playoffs
Season	Team	League	GP	G	A	Pts	PIM	GP	G	A	Pts	PIM
1974–75	Montréal Bleu Blanc Rouge	QMJHL	72	35	24	59	38	8	0	0	0	0
1975–76	Montréal Juniors	QMJHL	36	12	23	35	29	—	—	—	—	—
1975–76	Québec Remparts	QMJHL	32	13	19	32	29	15	9	6	15	21
1976–77	Québec Remparts	QMJHL	72	84	96	180	95	14	16	9	25	29
1977–78	Dallas Black Hawks	CHL	41	17	18	35	28	13	4	4	8	32
1977–78	Chicago Black Hawks	NHL	31	7	11	18	20	—	—	—	—	—
1978–79	New Brunswick Hawks	AHL	60	26	28	54	85	5	2	2	4	0
1978–79	Chicago Black Hawks	NHL	11	0	1	1	9	—	—	—	—	—
1979–80	Springfield Indians	AHL	78	28	43	71	60	—	—	—	—	—
1979–80	Hartford Whalers	NHL	1	0	0	0	0	—	—	—	—	—
1980–81	Binghamton Whalers	AHL	52	13	27	40	70	—	—	—	—	—
1981–82	Zürcher SC	NDA	28	28	21	49	20	—	—	—	—	—
1982–83	Salt Lake Golden Eagles	CHL	3	0	2	2	4	—	—	—	—	—
1982–83	Zürcher SC	SUI.2	—	36	—	—	—	—	—	—	—	—
1983–84	Zürcher SC	NDA	—	—	—	—	—	—	—	—	—	—
1984–85	HC Salzburg	AUT.2	11	9	10	19	48	—	—	—	—	—
AHL totals			190	67	99	166	215	5	2	2	4	0
NHL totals			43	7	12	19	29	—	—	—	—	—
