= Mike McDougal (ice hockey) =

American ice hockey player

- Born: April 30, 1958 (age 66); Port Huron, Michigan, U.S.
- Height: 6 ft 2 in (188 cm)
- Weight: 205 lb (93 kg; 14 st 9 lb)
- Position: Right wing
- Shot: Left
- Played for: New York Rangers; Hartford Whalers
- National team: United States
- NHL draft: 76th overall, 1978; New York Rangers
- Playing career: 1976–1984

Michael George McDougal (born April 30, 1958) is an American former professional ice hockey forward. He played 61 games in the National Hockey League with the New York Rangers and Hartford Whalers between 1978 and 1983. The rest of his career, which lasted from 1976 to 1984, was mainly spent in the minor leagues. Internationally McDougal played for the American national team at the 1977 and 1978 World Junior Championships.

== Biography ==
As a youth, McDougal played in the 1969 Quebec International Pee-Wee Hockey Tournament with a minor ice hockey team from Port Huron.

He was drafted 76th overall in the 1978 NHL Amateur Draft by the New York Rangers. He played three games for the Rangers and played mostly with the New Haven Nighthawks of the American Hockey League. In 1981, McDougal joined the Hartford Whalers where during the 1982-83 NHL season, he scored 8 goals and 10 assists in 55 games. He however spent the majority of his tenure in the AHL with the Binghamton Whalers and eventually retired in 1984.

== Career statistics ==
=== Regular season and playoffs ===
			Regular season					Playoffs
Season	Team	League	GP	G	A	Pts	PIM	GP	G	A	Pts	PIM
1973–74	Port Huron Flags	WMWJHL	40	27	33	60	—	—	—	—	—	—
1974–75	Montreal Bleu Blanc Rouge	QMJHL	70	21	27	48	111	8	4	2	6	4
1975–76	Montreal Juniors	QMJHL	71	31	43	74	71	6	0	3	3	0
1976–77	Port Huron Flags	IHL	59	25	29	54	46	—	—	—	—	—
1977–78	Port Huron Flags	IHL	44	15	16	31	65	—	—	—	—	—
1978–79	New York Rangers	NHL	1	0	0	0	0	—	—	—	—	—
1978–79	New Haven Nighthawks	AHL	78	24	26	50	60	10	1	5	6	8
1979–80	New Haven Nighthawks	AHL	68	17	25	42	43	3	0	3	3	0
1980–81	New York Rangers	NHL	2	0	0	0	0	—	—	—	—	—
1980–81	New Haven Nighthawks	AHL	66	21	23	44	20	4	0	0	0	2
1981–82	Hartford Whalers	NHL	3	0	0	0	0	—	—	—	—	—
1981–82	Binghamton Whalers	AHL	58	10	18	28	56	14	1	8	9	12
1982–83	Hartford Whalers	NHL	55	8	10	18	43	—	—	—	—	—
1982–83	Binghamton Whalers	AHL	14	7	5	12	20	—	—	—	—	—
1983–84	Binghamton Whalers	AHL	59	11	14	25	56	—	—	—	—	—
AHL totals			343	90	111	201	255	31	2	16	18	22
NHL totals			61	8	10	18	43	—	—	—	—	—

=== International ===
Year	Team	Event	GP	G	A	Pts	PIM
1977	United States	WJC	7	4	1	5	0
1978	United States	WJC	6	3	5	8	10
Junior totals			13	7	6	13	10
