= Glen Currie =

Canadian ice hockey player (born 1958)

- Born: July 18, 1958 (age 67) Montreal, Quebec, Canada
- Height: 6 ft 2 in (188 cm)
- Weight: 180 lb (82 kg; 12 st 12 lb)
- Position: Left wing
- Shot: Left
- Played for: Washington Capitals; Los Angeles Kings
- NHL draft: 38th overall, 1978; Washington Capitals
- Playing career: 1978–1988

Glen Allen Currie (born July 18, 1958) is a Canadian former professional ice hockey left winger. He played in the National Hockey League with the Washington Capitals and Los Angeles Kings from 1980 to 1987. He was selected 38th overall by the Capitals in the 1978 NHL entry draft. Currie is the nephew of former NHL hockey player Jimmy Peters Sr.

== Career statistics ==
=== Regular season and playoffs ===
			Regular season					Playoffs
Season	Team	League	GP	G	A	Pts	PIM	GP	G	A	Pts	PIM
1975–76	Laval National	QMJHL	72	15	54	69	20	—	—	—	—	—
1976–77	Laval National	QMJHL	72	28	51	79	42	7	1	4	5	15
1977–78	Laval National	QMJHL	72	63	82	145	29	5	3	1	4	0
1978–79	Port Huron Flags	IHL	69	27	36	63	43	7	5	4	9	2
1979–80	Washington Capitals	NHL	32	2	0	2	2	—	—	—	—	—
1979–80	Hershey Bears	AHL	45	17	26	43	16	—	—	—	—	—
1980–81	Washington Capitals	NHL	40	5	13	18	16	—	—	—	—	—
1980–81	Hershey Bears	AHL	35	18	21	39	10	—	—	—	—	—
1981–82	Washington Capitals	NHL	43	7	7	14	14	—	—	—	—	—
1981–82	Hershey Bears	AHL	31	12	12	24	6	—	—	—	—	—
1982–83	Washington Capitals	NHL	68	11	28	39	20	4	0	3	3	4
1982–83	Hershey Bears	AHL	12	5	11	16	6	—	—	—	—	—
1983–84	Washington Capitals	NHL	80	12	24	36	20	8	1	0	1	0
1984–85	Washington Capitals	NHL	44	1	5	6	19	—	—	—	—	—
1984–85	Binghamton Whalers	AHL	17	1	5	6	6	8	2	5	7	2
1985–86	Los Angeles Kings	NHL	12	1	2	3	9	—	—	—	—	—
1985–86	New Haven Nighthawks	AHL	8	0	4	4	2	2	0	0	0	10
1986–87	New Haven Nighthawks	AHL	54	12	16	28	16	6	2	1	3	0
1987–88	Los Angeles Kings	NHL	7	0	0	0	0	—	—	—	—	—
1987–88	New Haven Nighthawks	AHL	55	15	19	34	14	—	—	—	—	—
AHL totals			257	80	114	194	76	16	4	6	10	12
NHL totals			326	39	79	118	100	12	1	3	4	4
