= Richard David =

Canadian retired ice hockey left winger

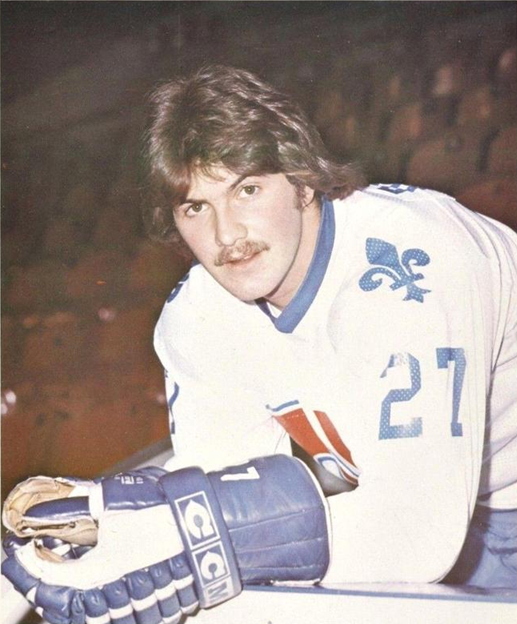
- David in 1979 photo
- Born: April 8, 1958 (age 68) Notre-Dame-de-la-Salette, Quebec, Canada
- Height: 6 ft 0 in (183 cm)
- Weight: 195 lb (88 kg; 13 st 13 lb)
- Position: Left wing
- Shot: Left
- Played for: Quebec Nordiques
- NHL draft: 42nd overall, 1978; Montreal Canadiens
- Playing career: 1978–1984

Richard David (born April 8, 1958) is a Canadian former professional ice hockey left winger. He played for the Quebec Nordiques in the National Hockey League and the World Hockey Association between 1978 and 1983. As a youth, he played in the 1971 Quebec International Pee-Wee Hockey Tournament with a minor ice hockey team from Buckingham, Quebec.

== Career statistics ==
=== Regular season and playoffs ===
			Regular season					Playoffs
Season	Team	League	GP	G	A	Pts	PIM	GP	G	A	Pts	PIM
1973–74	Hull Festivals	QMJHL	65	24	22	46	16	—	—	—	—	—
1974–75	Hull Festivals	QMJHL	23	4	8	12	36	—	—	—	—	—
1974–75	Sorel Eperviers	QMJHL	34	13	15	28	64	—	—	—	—	—
1975–76	Sorel Eperviers	QMJHL	25	17	18	35	41	—	—	—	—	—
1975–76	Trois-Rivieres Draveurs	QMJHL	48	36	50	86	33	10	8	13	21	20
1976–77	Trois-Rivieres Draveurs	QMJHL	66	52	58	110	76	—	—	—	—	—
1977–78	Trois-Rivieres Draveurs	QMJHL	69	50	61	111	87	13	17	16	33	7
1977–78	Trois-Rivieres Draveurs	M-Cup	—	—	—	—	—	4	3	2	5	0
1978–79	Quebec Nordiques	WHA	14	0	4	4	4	—	—	—	—	—
1978–79	Binghamton Dusters	AHL	10	5	2	7	2	—	—	—	—	—
1979–80	Quebec Nordiques	NHL	10	0	0	0	2	—	—	—	—	—
1979–80	Syracuse Firebirds	AHL	66	29	32	61	36	4	0	1	1	0
1980–81	Lausanne HC	NLA	—	—	—	—	—	—	—	—	—	—
1980–81	Rochester Americans	AHL	1	0	0	0	0	—	—	—	—	—
1980–81	Erie Blades	EHL	32	10	32	42	47	8	5	5	10	6
1981–82	Quebec Nordiques	NHL	5	1	1	2	4	1	0	0	0	0
1981–82	Fredericton Express	AHL	74	51	32	83	18	—	—	—	—	—
1982–83	Quebec Nordiques	NHL	16	3	3	6	4	—	—	—	—	—
1982–83	Fredericton Express	AHL	48	20	36	56	17	12	9	3	12	6
1984–85	HC Sierre	NLB	5	5	1	6	—	—	—	—	—	—
WHA totals			14	0	4	4	4	—	—	—	—	—
NHL totals			31	4	4	8	10	1	0	0	0	0
