= Sylvain Locas =

Canadian ice hockey player (born 1958)

- Born: February 17, 1958 (age 67); Chicoutimi, Quebec, Canada
- Height: 5 ft 9 in (175 cm)
- Weight: 168 lb (76 kg; 12 st 0 lb)
- Position: Centre
- Shot: Left
- Played for: Kansas City Red Wings; Nova Scotia Voyageurs; Adirondack Red Wings; Kalamazoo Wings; Milwaukee Admirals; Brûleurs de Loups
- NHL draft: 95th overall, 1978; Detroit Red Wings
- Playing career: 1978–1980; 1988–1990

Sylvain Locas (born February 17, 1958, in Chicoutimi, Quebec) is a former professional ice hockey centre.

Prior to turning professional Locas played four seasons (1974–78) in the QMJHL with the Chicoutimi Saguenéens and Sherbrooke Beavers. Locas was drafted in the sixth round by the Detroit Red Wings in the 1978 NHL Amateur Draft but never managed to play in the National Hockey League.

Locas played 75 games of professional hockey in the CHL with the Kansas City Red Wings, 36 games in the AHL with the Nova Scotia Voyageurs and Adirondack Red Wings, and 25 games in the IHL with the Kalamazoo Wings and Milwaukee Admirals before retiring from professional hockey in 1980.

Locas returned, after nearly a decade away from the game, to play for Brûleurs de Loups based in Grenoble, France in the Ligue Magnus for two seasons.

== Career statistics ==
			Regular season					Playoffs
Season	Team	League	GP	G	A	Pts	PIM	GP	G	A	Pts	PIM
1974–75	Chicoutimi Saguenéens	QMJHL	68	32	32	64	39	10	2	3	5	25
1975–76	Chicoutimi Saguenéens	QMJHL	72	80	80	160	100	5	5	4	9	11
1976–77	Chicoutimi Saguenéens	QMJHL	72	59	98	157	101	8	3	9	12	19
1977–78	Chicoutimi Saguenéens	QMJHL	6	3	4	7	12	—	—	—	—	—
1977–78	Sherbrooke Castors	QMJHL	62	80	77	157	128	10	10	9	19	24
1978–79	Kansas City Red Wings	CHL	75	27	34	61	92	4	2	2	4	11
1979–80	Adirondack Red Wings	AHL	11	4	3	7	16	—	—	—	—	—
1979–80	Kalamazoo Wings	IHL	5	1	3	4	18	—	—	—	—	—
1979–80	Nova Scotia Voyageurs	AHL	25	3	4	7	14	—	—	—	—	—
1979–80	Milwaukee Admirals	IHL	20	11	5	16	16	2	1	1	2	0
1989–90	CSG Grenoble	FRA	39	17	10	27	54	—	—	—	—	—
QMJHL totals			280	254	291	545	380	33	20	25	45	79
