= Mike Backman =

Canadian ice hockey player

- Born: January 2, 1955 (age 71) Halifax, Nova Scotia, Canada
- Height: 5 ft 10 in (178 cm)
- Weight: 175 lb (79 kg; 12 st 7 lb)
- Position: Right wing
- Shot: Right
- Played for: New York Rangers
- NHL draft: Undrafted
- WHA draft: 100th overall, 1975; Quebec Nordiques
- Playing career: 1978–1986

Michael Charles Backman (born January 2, 1955) is a Canadian former professional ice hockey right winger. He was drafted by the World Hockey Association's Quebec Nordiques in the seventh round, 100th, of the 1975 WHA Amateur Draft; however, he never played in that league. Despite being un-drafted in the National Hockey League, he played eighteen regular-season and ten playoff games in the NHL with the New York Rangers over three seasons from 1982 to 1983. Backman first played NHL hockey with the Rangers in the 1981-82 season, playing three games. He registered two assists that first year and the following year scored his first NHL goal.

Backman's elder son Sean was also a professional ice hockey player, as are his sons-in-law Jonathan Quick and Matt Moulson.

== Championships ==
He won the 1983-84 CHL championship, the Adams Cup, as a member of the Tulsa Oilers team coached by Tom Webster.

== Career statistics ==
=== Regular season and playoffs ===
			Regular season					Playoffs
Season	Team	League	GP	G	A	Pts	PIM	GP	G	A	Pts	PIM
1974–75	Montreal Juniors	QMJHL	38	13	20	33	85	9	2	3	5	24
1974–75	Saint Mary's University	CIAU	6	0	8	8	8	—	—	—	—	—
1975–76	Saint Mary's University	CIAU	19	13	10	23	49	—	—	—	—	—
1976–77	Saint Mary's University	CIAU	19	13	15	28	59	—	—	—	—	—
1977–78	Saint Mary's University	CIAU	17	7	12	19	47	—	—	—	—	—
1978–79	New Haven Nighthawks	AHL	6	2	1	3	0	6	3	1	4	15
1978–79	Toledo Goaldiggers	IHL	66	25	38	63	171	6	4	2	6	17
1979–80	New Haven Nighthawks	AHL	74	18	28	46	456	10	6	8	14	14
1980–81	New Haven Nighthawks	AHL	62	27	27	54	224	4	1	0	1	14
1981–82	New York Rangers	NHL	3	0	2	2	4	1	0	0	0	2
1981–82	Springfield Indians	AHL	74	24	27	51	147	—	—	—	—	—
1982–83	New York Rangers	NHL	7	1	3	4	6	9	2	2	4	0
1982–83	Tulsa Oilers	CHL	71	29	47	76	170	—	—	—	—	—
1983–84	New York Rangers	NHL	8	0	1	1	8	—	—	—	—	—
1983–84	Tulsa Oilers	CHL	50	12	28	40	103	9	4	2	6	22
1984–85	New Haven Nighthawks	AHL	72	10	36	46	120	—	—	—	—	—
1985–86	New Haven Nighthawks	AHL	4	0	0	0	4	—	—	—	—	—
AHL totals			292	81	119	200	951	20	10	9	19	43
NHL totals			18	1	6	7	18	10	2	2	4	2
