= Bob Sirois =

Canadian ice hockey player

- Born: February 6, 1954 (age 72) Montreal, Quebec, Canada
- Height: 6 ft 0 in (183 cm)
- Weight: 178 lb (81 kg; 12 st 10 lb)
- Position: Right wing
- Shot: Left
- Played for: Philadelphia Flyers; Washington Capitals; Lausanne HC
- NHL draft: 53rd overall, 1974; Philadelphia Flyers
- WHA draft: 103rd overall, 1974; Houston Aeros
- Playing career: 1974–1982

Robert Sirois (born February 6, 1954) is a Canadian former professional ice hockey right winger. He played 286 games in the National Hockey League (NHL) for the Philadelphia Flyers and Washington Capitals from 1974 to 1980. Sirois is the author of Discrimination In The NHL: Quebec Hockey Players Sidelined, a 2013 book on racial bias against Quebec-born hockey players.

== Playing career ==
Born in Montreal, Quebec, Sirois was originally drafted by the Philadelphia Flyers in 1974. Sirois played in only four games with the Flyers in over two seasons before he was traded to the Washington Capitals. He spent five seasons with the Capitals before leaving the NHL to play one season in Switzerland, and then in the AHL the year after that before retiring from active play in 1982.

== Career statistics ==
=== Regular season and playoffs ===
			Regular season					Playoffs
Season	Team	League	GP	G	A	Pts	PIM	GP	G	A	Pts	PIM
1969–70	Rosemont National	QMJHL	3	0	0	0	7	—	—	—	—	—
1970–71	Rosemont National	QMJHL	59	24	30	54	37	—	—	—	—	—
1971–72	Laval National	QMJHL	59	20	44	64	58	—	—	—	—	—
1972–73	Laval National	QMJHL	6	5	3	8	10	—	—	—	—	—
1972–73	Montréal Bleu Blanc Rouge	QMJHL	58	46	51	97	55	4	4	2	6	2
1973–74	Montréal Juniors	QMJHL	67	72	81	153	77	7	6	1	7	0
1974–75	Philadelphia Flyers	NHL	3	1	0	1	4	—	—	—	—	—
1974–75	Richmond Robins	AHL	53	26	23	49	38	—	—	—	—	—
1975–76	Philadelphia Flyers	NHL	1	0	0	0	0	—	—	—	—	—
1975–76	Richmond Robins	AHL	26	14	18	32	10	—	—	—	—	—
1975–76	Washington Capitals	NHL	43	10	19	29	6	—	—	—	—	—
1976–77	Washington Capitals	NHL	45	13	22	35	2	—	—	—	—	—
1977–78	Washington Capitals	NHL	72	24	37	61	6	—	—	—	—	—
1978–79	Washington Capitals	NHL	73	29	25	54	6	—	—	—	—	—
1979–80	Washington Capitals	NHL	49	15	17	32	18	—	—	—	—	—
1979–80	Hershey Bears	AHL	2	1	1	2	0	—	—	—	—	—
1980–81	HC Lausanne	NDA	—	—	—	—	—	—	—	—	—	—
1981–82	HC Lugano	NLB	—	—	—	—	—	—	—	—	—	—
1981–82	Hershey Bears	AHL	13	2	6	8	0	—	—	—	—	—
NHL totals			286	92	120	212	42	—	—	—	—	—
