= Kevin Reeves (ice hockey) =

Canadian ice hockey player (born 1958)

- Born: October 2, 1958 (age 67) Westmount, Quebec, Canada
- Height: 5 ft 8 in (173 cm)
- Weight: 165 lb (75 kg; 11 st 11 lb)
- Position: Centre
- Shot: Left
- Played for: Nova Scotia Voyageurs; Muskegon Mohawks
- NHL draft: 69th overall, 1978; Montreal Canadiens
- Playing career: 1978–1984

Kevin Reeves (born October 2, 1958) is a Canadian former professional ice hockey player. He won the Michel Brière Memorial Trophy as the Most Valuable Player in the Quebec Major Junior Hockey League for his outstanding play with the Montreal Juniors during the 1977–78 QMJHL season.

== Career statistics ==
			Regular season					Playoffs
Season	Team	League	GP	G	A	Pts	PIM	GP	G	A	Pts	PIM
1973–74	Montréal Juniors	QMJHL	1	0	0	0	0	—	—	—	—	—
1975–76	Montréal Juniors	QMJHL	67	34	49	83	8	6	2	5	7	2
1976–77	Montréal Juniors	QMJHL	72	48	87	135	16	13	6	14	20	0
1977–78	Montréal Juniors	QMJHL	72	62	109	171	44	13	7	11	18	4
1978–79	Nova Scotia Voyageurs	AHL	60	6	8	14	10	—	—	—	—	—
1979–80	Muskegon Mohawks	IHL	80	42	64	106	16	5	2	1	3	0
1980–81	Lausanne HC	NDA
1980–81	Muskegon Mohawks	IHL	14	6	14	20	6	—	—	—	—	—
1981–82	Muskegon Mohawks	IHL	82	36	67	103	4	—	—	—	—	—
1982–83	Muskegon Mohawks	IHL	35	14	24	38	2	4	1	1	2	2
1983–84	Muskegon Mohawks	IHL	82	26	41	67	8	—	—	—	—	—
IHL totals			293	124	210	334	36	9	3	2	5	2
