= Garth MacGuigan =

Canadian ice hockey player

- Born: February 16, 1956 (age 69); Charlottetown, PEI, Canada
- Height: 6 ft 0 in (183 cm)
- Weight: 190 lb (86 kg; 13 st 8 lb)
- Position: Centre
- Shot: Left
- Played for: New York Islanders
- NHL draft: 50th overall, 1976; New York Islanders
- WHA draft: 56th overall, 1976; Quebec Nordiques
- Playing career: 1976–1985

Garth Leslie MacGuigan (born February 16, 1956) is a Canadian former professional ice hockey centre. He was selected by the NHL's New York Islanders 50th overall in the third round of the 1976 NHL Amateur Draft. In the same year he was drafted 56th overall in the fifth round by the Quebec Nordiques in the WHA Amateur Draft. He went on to play in five games for the New York Islanders between 1979 and 1984.

MacGuigan was born in Charlottetown, Prince Edward Island.

== Career statistics ==
=== Regular season and playoffs ===
			Regular season					Playoffs
Season	Team	League	GP	G	A	Pts	PIM	GP	G	A	Pts	PIM
1974–75	Montreal Bleu Blanc Rouge	QMJHL	63	30	37	67	84	9	2	4	6	14
1975–76	Montreal Juniors	QMJHL	69	47	46	93	94	6	5	2	7	33
1976–77	Fort Worth Texans	CHL	1	0	0	0	0	2	0	0	0	0
1976–77	Muskegon Mohawks	IHL	78	54	40	94	156	7	5	3	8	0
1977–78	Fort Worth Texans	CHL	70	17	24	41	54	14	3	4	7	18
1978–79	Fort Worth Texans	CHL	75	28	21	49	120	5	1	2	3	9
1979–80	Indianapolis Checkers	CHL	77	28	34	62	94	7	2	3	5	14
1979–80	New York Islanders	NHL	2	0	0	0	2	—	—	—	—	—
1980–81	Indianapolis Checkers	CHL	38	37	38	75	96	5	1	2	3	20
1981–82	Indianapolis Checkers	CHL	80	24	51	75	112	13	4	7	11	54
1982–83	Indianapolis Checkers	CHL	80	37	35	72	70	13	3	4	7	21
1983–84	Indianapolis Checkers	CHL	68	25	41	66	109	10	3	3	6	2
1983–84	New York Islanders	NHL	3	0	1	1	0	—	—	—	—	—
1984–85	Indianapolis Checkers	IHL	67	24	32	56	52	7	0	5	5	4
CHL totals			489	196	244	440	655	69	17	25	42	138
NHL totals			5	0	1	1	2	—	—	—	—	—
