= Dwight Schofield =

American ice hockey player (born 1956)

- Born: March 25, 1956 (age 69) Waltham, Massachusetts, U.S.
- Height: 6 ft 3 in (191 cm)
- Weight: 201 lb (91 kg; 14 st 5 lb)
- Position: Defence
- Shot: Left
- Played for: Detroit Red Wings; Montreal Canadiens; St. Louis Blues; Washington Capitals; Pittsburgh Penguins; Winnipeg Jets
- NHL draft: 76th overall, 1976; Detroit Red Wings
- WHA draft: 62nd overall, 1976; New England Whalers
- Playing career: 1976–1988

Dwight Hamilton Schofield (born March 25, 1956) is an American former professional ice hockey player. He played in the National Hockey League for six teams between 1977 and 1988.

Dwight currently lives in Brentwood, Missouri, a suburb in St. Louis, and has worked many years as a coach and mentor to the younger players in the youth and High School programs.

== Biography ==
As a youth, Schofield played in the 1968 and 1969 Quebec International Pee-Wee Hockey Tournaments with a minor ice hockey team from Boston.

Selected in 1976 by the Detroit Red Wings of the National Hockey League and the New England Whalers of the World Hockey Association, Schofield also played for the Montreal Canadiens, St. Louis Blues, Washington Capitals, Pittsburgh Penguins, and Winnipeg Jets before he retired following the 1987–88 NHL season.

Schofield primarily played the role of enforcer throughout his professional career, typically assigned to protect his team's scorers. His reputation as a fighter with the Washington Capitals earned him the nickname "Sconan the Barbarian."

=== Regular season and playoffs ===
			Regular season					Playoffs
Season	Team	League	GP	G	A	Pts	PIM	GP	G	A	Pts	PIM
1974–75	London Knights	OMJHL	70	6	16	22	124	—	—	—	—	—
1975–76	London Knights	OMJHL	59	14	29	43	121	5	0	1	1	15
1976–77	Detroit Red Wings	NHL	3	1	0	1	2	—	—	—	—	—
1976–77	Kalamazoo Wings	IHL	73	20	41	61	180	10	4	7	11	61
1977–78	Kalamazoo Wings	IHL	3	3	6	9	21	—	—	—	—	—
1977–78	Kansas City Red Wings	CHL	22	3	7	10	58	—	—	—	—	—
1978–79	Kalamazoo Wings	IHL	47	8	29	37	199	—	—	—	—	—
1978–79	Kanas City Red Wings	CHL	13	1	4	5	20	—	—	—	—	—
1978–79	Fort Wayne Komets	IHL	14	2	3	5	54	13	0	9	9	28
1979–80	Dayton Gems	IHL	71	15	47	62	257	—	—	—	—	—
1979–80	Maine Mariners	AHL	—	—	—	—	—	5	1	1	2	4
1980–81	Milwaukee Admirals	IHL	82	18	41	59	327	7	2	5	7	25
1981–82	Nova Scotia Voyageurs	AHL	75	7	24	31	335	9	1	3	4	41
1982–83	Montreal Canadiens	NHL	2	0	0	0	7	—	—	—	—	—
1982–83	Nova Scotia Voyageurs	AHL	73	10	21	31	248	7	0	3	3	21
1983–84	St. Louis Blues	NHL	70	4	10	14	219	4	0	0	0	26
1983–84	Toledo Goaldiggers	IHL	3	2	2	4	4	—	—	—	—	—
1984–85	St. Louis Blues	NHL	43	1	4	5	184	2	0	0	0	15
1985–86	Washington Capitals	NHL	50	1	2	3	127	3	0	0	0	14
1986–87	Pittsburgh Penguins	NHL	25	1	6	7	59	—	—	—	—	—
1986–87	Baltimore Skipjacks	AHL	20	1	5	6	58	—	—	—	—	—
1987–88	Winnipeg Jets	NHL	18	0	0	0	33	—	—	—	—	—
1987–88	Kalamazoo Wings	IHL	34	2	7	9	150	—	—	—	—	—
IHL totals			327	70	176	246	1192	30	6	21	27	114
NHL totals			211	8	22	30	631	9	0	0	0	55
