= Dan Bolduc =

American ice hockey player (born 1953)

- Born: April 6, 1953 (age 72) Waterville, Maine, U.S.
- Height: 5 ft 9 in (175 cm)
- Weight: 190 lb (86 kg; 13 st 8 lb)
- Position: Left wing
- Shot: Left
- Played for: New England Whalers; Detroit Red Wings; Calgary Flames
- National team: United States
- NHL draft: Undrafted
- Playing career: 1975–1985

Daniel George "Danny" Bolduc (born April 6, 1953) is an American retired professional ice hockey player who played in the National Hockey League and World Hockey Association between 1976 and 1984.

Bolduc grew up in Waterville, Maine and attended Phillips Academy, Andover, Massachusetts from 1970 to 1972. He played three years at Harvard University before joining the Olympic team.

Bolduc was a member of the Detroit Red Wings and Calgary Flames of the NHL as well as the WHA New England Whalers after starring for the US team in the 1976 Winter Olympics as well as the Harvard University men's hockey team in the early 1970s. He also represented the United States in the 1976 Canada Cup and 1979 World Championships.

== Career statistics ==
=== Regular season and playoffs ===
			Regular season					Playoffs
Season	Team	League	GP	G	A	Pts	PIM	GP	G	A	Pts	PIM
1970–71	Phillips Academy	HS-MA	—	—	—	—	—	—	—	—	—	—
1971–72	Phillips Academy	HS-MA	—	—	—	—	—	—	—	—	—	—
1972–73	Harvard University	ECAC	13	15	17	32	17	—	—	—	—	—
1973–74	Harvard University	ECAC	29	15	9	24	24	—	—	—	—	—
1974–75	Harvard University	ECAC	29	13	11	24	18	—	—	—	—	—
1975–76	United States National Team	Intl	54	39	31	70	46	—	—	—	—	—
1975–76	New England Whalers	WHA	14	2	5	7	14	16	1	6	7	4
1976–77	Rhode Island Reds	AHL	44	11	22	33	23	—	—	—	—	—
1976–77	New England Whalers	WHA	33	8	3	11	15	—	—	—	—	—
1977–78	Springfield Indians	AHL	35	14	9	23	35	—	—	—	—	—
1977–78	New England Whalers	WHA	41	5	5	10	22	14	2	4	6	4
1978–79	Detroit Red Wings	NHL	56	16	13	29	14	—	—	—	—	—
1978–79	Kansas City Red Wings	CHL	23	21	11	32	11	—	—	—	—	—
1979–80	Detroit Red Wings	NHL	44	6	5	11	19	—	—	—	—	—
1979–80	Adirondack Red Wings	AHL	13	1	3	4	4	5	0	0	0	0
1980–81	Adirondack Red Wings	AHL	77	23	25	48	58	18	4	6	10	36
1981–82	Nova Scotia Voyageurs	AHL	74	39	40	79	60	5	2	0	2	0
1982–83	Colorado Flames	CHL	79	27	45	72	39	6	2	3	5	2
1983–84	Calgary Flames	NHL	2	0	1	1	0	1	0	0	0	0
1983–84	Colorado Flames	CHL	30	37	17	54	34	6	2	1	3	0
1984–85	Moncton Golden Flames	AHL	45	7	8	15	22	—	—	—	—	—
WHA totals			88	15	13	28	51	30	3	10	13	8
NHL totals			102	22	19	41	33	1	0	0	0	0

=== International ===
Year	Team	Event	GP	G	A	Pts	PIM
1976	United States	OLY	6	2	0	2	6
1976	United States	CC	2	0	0	0	0
1979	United States	WC	8	3	0	3	2
Senior totals			16	5	0	5	8
