= Peter Marsh (ice hockey) =

Canadian ice hockey player

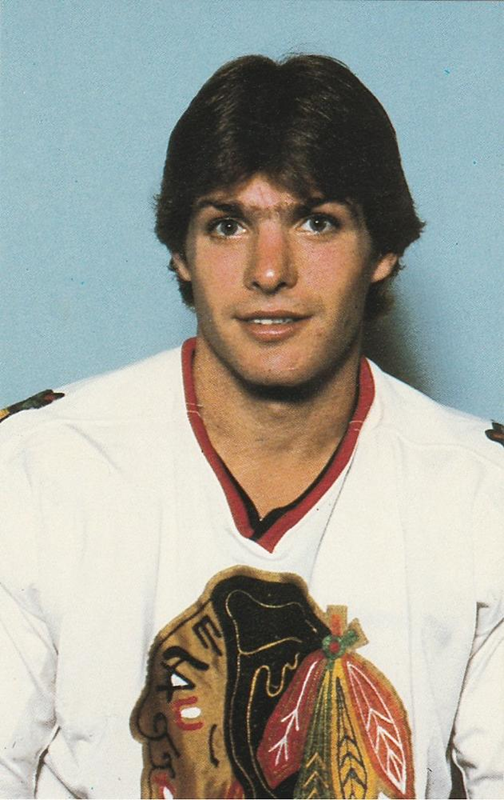
- Marsh in 1983 photo
- Born: December 21, 1956 (age 69) Halifax, Nova Scotia, Canada
- Height: 6 ft 1 in (185 cm)
- Weight: 180 lb (82 kg; 12 st 12 lb)
- Position: Right wing
- Shot: Left
- Played for: Cincinnati Stingers; Winnipeg Jets; Chicago Black Hawks
- NHL draft: 29th overall, 1976; Pittsburgh Penguins
- WHA draft: 2nd overall, 1976; Cincinnati Stingers
- Playing career: 1976–1984

Peter William Marsh (born December 21, 1956) is a Canadian former professional ice hockey player.

== Career ==
Marsh played 230 games in the World Hockey Association and 278 games in the National Hockey League. He played for the Winnipeg Jets, Cincinnati Stingers, and Chicago Black Hawks.

== Personal life ==
Marsh has two children. His son, Adam, played with the Saint John Sea Dogs, Val-d'Or Foreurs and Charlottetown Islanders of the Quebec Major Junior Hockey League.

== Career statistics ==
=== Regular season and playoffs ===
			Regular season					Playoffs
Season	Team	League	GP	G	A	Pts	PIM	GP	G	A	Pts	PIM
1973–74	Sherbrooke Castors	QMJHL	43	7	9	16	45	2	0	0	0	0
1974–75	Sherbrooke Castors	QMJHL	65	36	34	70	131	12	10	11	21	37
1974–75	Sherbrooke Castors	MC	—	—	—	—	—	3	0	2	2	0
1975–76	Sherbrooke Castors	QMJHL	70	75	81	156	105	16	9	10	19	19
1976–77	Cincinnati Stingers	WHA	76	23	28	51	52	4	2	0	2	0
1977–78	Cincinnati Stingers	WHA	74	25	25	50	123	—	—	—	—	—
1978–79	Cincinnati Stingers	WHA	80	43	23	66	95	3	1	0	1	0
1979–80	Winnipeg Jets	NHL	57	18	20	38	59	—	—	—	—	—
1980–81	Winnipeg Jets	NHL	24	6	7	13	9	—	—	—	—	—
1980–81	Chicago Black Hawks	NHL	29	4	6	10	10	2	1	1	2	2
1981–82	Chicago Black Hawks	NHL	57	10	18	28	47	12	0	2	2	31
1982–83	Chicago Black Hawks	NHL	68	6	14	20	55	12	0	2	2	0
1983–84	Chicago Black Hawks	NHL	43	4	6	10	44	—	—	—	—	—
1983–84	Springfield Indians	AHL	23	8	13	21	32	4	2	0	2	0
WHA totals			230	91	76	167	270	7	3	0	3	0
NHL totals			278	48	71	119	224	26	1	5	6	33

=== International ===
Year	Team	Event	GP	G	A	Pts	PIM
1976	Canada	WJC	4	4	0	4	8
