= 1977–78 QMJHL season =

Canadian junior ice hockey season

The 1977–78 QMJHL season was the ninth season in the history of the Quebec Major Junior Hockey League. The league inaugurates two awards, the Robert Lebel Trophy for the team with best goals against average, and the Guy Lafleur Trophy for the Most Valuable Player of the playoffs. Ten teams played 72 games each in the schedule. The Trois-Rivières Draveurs finished first overall in the regular season winning the Jean Rougeau Trophy, and won the President's Cup defeating the Montreal Juniors in the finals.

== Team changes ==
- The Sorel Éperviers relocate to Verdun, Quebec, and switch to the Lebel Division.
- The Sherbrooke Castors switch to the Dilio Division.

== Final standings ==
Note: GP = Games played; W = Wins; L = Losses; T = Ties; PTS = Points; GF = Goals for; GA = Goals against

Dilio Division	GP	W	L	T	Pts	GF	GA
Trois-Rivières Draveurs	72	47	18	7	101	412	252
Sherbrooke Castors	72	41	26	5	87	482	380
Quebec Remparts	72	28	35	9	65	334	339
Chicoutimi Saguenéens	72	16	45	11	43	335	458
Shawinigan Dynamos	72	3	65	4	10	258	687

Lebel Division	GP	W	L	T	Pts	GF	GA
Cornwall Royals	72	46	18	8	100	404	258
Montreal Juniors	72	41	25	6	88	397	327
Laval National	72	35	26	11	81	435	362
Verdun Éperviers	72	32	31	9	73	378	332
Hull Olympiques	72	34	34	4	72	357	397

- complete list of standings.

== Scoring leaders ==
Note: GP = Games played; G = Goals; A = Assists; Pts = Points; PIM = Penalties in minutes

Player	Team	GP	G	A	Pts	PIM
Ron Carter	Sherbrooke Castors	71	88	86	174	28
Kevin Reeves	Montreal Juniors	72	62	109	171	44
Sylvain Locas	Chicoutimi/Sherbrooke	68	83	81	164	138
Mark Green	Sherbrooke Castors	71	56	100	156	71
Rick Vaive	Sherbrooke Castors	68	76	79	155	199
Denis Pomerleau	Hull/Trois-Rivières	73	75	73	148	45
Dan Metivier	Hull Olympiques	66	73	75	148	59
Glen Currie	Laval National	72	63	82	145	29
Dan Geoffrion	Cornwall Royals	71	68	75	143	183
Rick Paterson	Cornwall Royals	71	58	80	138	105

- complete scoring statistics

== Playoffs ==
Richard David was the leading scorer of the playoffs with 33 points (17 goals, 16 assists).

Quarterfinals

- Trois-Rivières Draveurs defeated Quebec Remparts 4 games to 0.
- Cornwall Royals defeated Hull Olympiques 4 games to 0.
- Montreal Juniors defeated Verdun Éperviers 4 games to 0.
- Sherbrooke Castors defeated Laval National 4 games to 0, 1 tie.

Semifinals

- Trois-Rivières Draveurs defeated Sherbrooke Castors 4 games to 1.
- Montreal Juniors defeated Cornwall Royals 4 games to 1.

Finals

- Trois-Rivières Draveurs defeated Montreal Juniors 4 games to 0.

== All-star teams ==
First team

- Goaltender - Jacques Cloutier, Trois-Rivières Draveurs
- Left defence - Mark Hardy, Montreal Juniors
- Right defence - Ray Bourque, Verdun Éperviers
- Left winger - Patrick Daley, Laval National
- Centreman - Kevin Reeves, Montreal Juniors
- Right winger - Ron Carter, Sherbrooke Castors
- Coach - Michel Bergeron, Trois-Rivières Draveurs

Second team

- Goaltender - Marco Baron, Montreal Juniors
- Left defence - Kevin Lowe, Quebec Remparts
- Right defence - Graeme Nicolson, Cornwall Royals
- Left winger - Michel Goulet, Quebec Remparts
- Centreman - Glen Currie, Laval National
- Right winger - Daniel Metivier, Hull Olympiques
- Coach - Orval Tessier, Cornwall Royals
- List of First/Second/Rookie team all-stars.

== Trophies and awards ==
Team

- President's Cup - Playoff Champions, Trois-Rivières Draveurs
- Jean Rougeau Trophy - Regular Season Champions, Trois-Rivières Draveurs
- Robert Lebel Trophy - Team with best GAA, Trois-Rivières Draveurs

Player

- Michel Brière Memorial Trophy - Most Valuable Player, Kevin Reeves, Montreal Juniors
- Jean Béliveau Trophy - Top Scorer, Ron Carter, Sherbrooke Castors
- Guy Lafleur Trophy - Playoff MVP, Richard David, Trois-Rivières Draveurs
- Jacques Plante Memorial Trophy - Best GAA, Tim Bernhardt, Cornwall Royals
- Emile Bouchard Trophy - Defenceman of the Year, Mark Hardy, Montreal Juniors
- Michel Bergeron Trophy - Rookie of the Year, Denis Savard, Montreal Juniors and Normand Rochefort, Trois-Rivières Draveurs
- Frank J. Selke Memorial Trophy - Most sportsmanlike player, Kevin Reeves, Montreal Juniors

== See also ==
- 1978 Memorial Cup
- 1978 NHL entry draft
- 1977–78 OMJHL season
- 1977–78 WCHL season

Preceded by 1976–77 QMJHL season	QMJHL seasons	Succeeded by 1978–79 QMJHL season
