= Jean Gagnon (ice hockey) =

Canadian ice hockey player

- Born: November 25, 1956 (age 68); Quebec City, Quebec, Canada
- Height: 5 ft 7 in (170 cm)
- Weight: 165 lb (75 kg; 11 st 11 lb)
- Position: Defence
- Shot: Left
- Played for: NLA; HC Fribourg-Gottéron; Lausanne HC
- National team: Canada
- NHL draft: Undrafted
- WHA draft: 52nd overall, 1976; Indianapolis Racers
- Playing career: 1976–1997

Jean Gagnon (born November 25, 1956) is a former Canadian-born ice hockey player who played 20 seasons of professional hockey, including six seasons (1980–1986) with HC Fribourg-Gottéron in the Swiss National League A.

== Awards and honours ==
| Award | Year |
|---|---|
| QMJHL Emile Bouchard Trophy (Defenseman of the Year) | 1975–76 |
