= Dave Farrish =

Canadian ice hockey player

- Born: August 1, 1956 (age 69) Wingham, Ontario, Canada
- Height: 6 ft 1 in (185 cm)
- Weight: 195 lb (88 kg; 13 st 13 lb)
- Position: Defence
- Shot: Left
- Played for: New York Rangers; Quebec Nordiques; Toronto Maple Leafs; SC Riessersee; HC Davos; Villacher SV
- NHL draft: 24th overall, 1976; New York Rangers
- WHA draft: 5th overall, 1976; San Diego Mariners
- Playing career: 1976–1990

David Allan Farrish (born August 1, 1956) is a Canadian former professional ice hockey defenceman who played 430 games in the National Hockey League (NHL) with the New York Rangers, Quebec Nordiques, and Toronto Maple Leafs between 1976 and 1984. He featured in the 1979 Stanley Cup Final with the Rangers.

He also played in the American Hockey League and won the Eddie Shore Award as the league's best defenceman during the 1981–82 season. After his playing career Farrish worked as a coach.

== Coaching career ==
Farrish has served as head coach for the Moncton Hawks, Salt Lake Golden Eagles, Fort Wayne Komets, Springfield Falcons, Louisiana IceGators and the Pensacola Ice Pilots. At the NHL level, Farrish served as an assistant coach to Randy Carlyle with the Anaheim Ducks from 2005 to the middle of the 2011-12 season. On March 3, 2012, Farrish was appointed an assistant coach, again under Carlyle, with the Toronto Maple Leafs. Farrish was let go by the Maple Leafs in May 2014. He won the Stanley Cup with Anaheim in 2007.

Farrish was named as an assistant coach for the Colorado Avalanche on July 7, 2015. On May 23, 2017, Farrish was relieved of these duties.

== Career statistics ==
=== Regular season and playoffs ===
			Regular season					Playoffs
Season	Team	League	GP	G	A	Pts	PIM	GP	G	A	Pts	PIM
1972–73	Stratford Cullitons	OHA-B	—	—	—	—	—	—	—	—	—	—
1973–74	Sudbury Wolves	OHA	58	11	20	31	205	4	0	0	0	14
1974–75	Sudbury Wolves	OMJHL	60	20	44	64	258	14	3	4	7	32
1975–76	Sudbury Wolves	OMJHL	66	27	48	75	155	17	3	12	15	22
1976–77	New York Rangers	NHL	80	2	17	19	102	—	—	—	—	—
1977–78	New York Rangers	NHL	66	3	5	8	62	3	0	0	0	0
1977–78	New Haven Nighthawks	AHL	10	0	3	3	4	—	—	—	—	—
1978–79	New York Rangers	NHL	71	1	19	20	61	7	0	2	2	14
1979–80	Quebec Nordiques	NHL	4	0	0	0	0	—	—	—	—	—
1979–80	Toronto Maple Leafs	NHL	20	1	8	9	30	3	0	0	0	10
1979–80	New Brunswick Hawks	AHL	20	3	1	4	22	—	—	—	—	—
1979–80	Syracuse Firebirds	AHL	14	4	10	14	17	—	—	—	—	—
1980–81	Toronto Maple Leafs	NHL	74	2	18	20	90	1	0	0	0	0
1981–82	New Brunswick Hawks	AHL	67	13	24	37	80	15	4	5	9	20
1982–83	Toronto Maple Leafs	NHL	56	4	24	28	38	—	—	—	—	—
1982–83	St. Catharines Saints	AHL	14	2	12	14	18	—	—	—	—	—
1983–84	Toronto Maple Leafs	NHL	59	4	19	23	57	—	—	—	—	—
1983–84	St. Catharines Saints	AHL	4	0	2	2	6	7	0	1	1	4
1984–85	St. Catharines Saints	AHL	68	4	12	16	56	—	—	—	—	—
1985–86	Hershey Bears	AHL	74	5	17	22	78	18	0	4	4	24
1986–87	SC Riessersee	GER	26	7	10	17	74	—	—	—	—	—
1986–87	HC Davos	NLA	16	8	10	18	52	7	2	8	10	10
1987–88	New Haven Nighthawks	AHL	30	4	14	18	26	—	—	—	—	—
1987–88	Villacher SV	AUT	33	8	43	51	33	—	—	—	—	—
1988–89	Baltimore Skipjacks	AHL	60	2	13	15	62	—	—	—	—	—
1989–90	Moncton Hawks	AHL	1	0	0	0	2	—	—	—	—	—
AHL totals			362	37	108	145	371	40	4	10	14	48
NHL totals			430	17	110	127	440	14	0	2	2	24
