= Warren Skorodenski =

Canadian ice hockey player (born 1960)

- Born: March 22, 1960 (age 66) Winnipeg, Manitoba, Canada
- Height: 5 ft 8 in (173 cm)
- Weight: 165 lb (75 kg; 11 st 11 lb)
- Position: Goaltender
- Caught: Left
- Played for: Chicago Blackhawks; Edmonton Oilers
- National team: Canada
- NHL draft: Undrafted
- Playing career: 1980–1991

Warren Skorodenski (born March 22, 1960) is a Canadian former professional ice hockey goaltender who played for the Chicago Black Hawks and the Edmonton Oilers in the National Hockey League (NHL).

While playing for the New Brunswick Hawks during the 1981–82 AHL season, Skorodenski shared the Harry "Hap" Holmes Memorial Award for the American Hockey League's lowest goals against average with teammate Bob Janecyk. As Murray Bannerman's backup in Chicago in 1984–85, Skorodenski recorded the league's highest save percentage, at 0.903. He retired in 1991.

== Career statistics ==
=== Regular season and playoffs ===
			Regular season									Playoffs
Season	Team	League	GP	W	L	T	MIN	GA	SO	GAA	SV%	GP	W	L	MIN	GA	SO	GAA	SV%
1976–77	Kildonan North Stars	MJHL	22	—	—	—	1170	78	0	4.00	—	—	—	—	—	—	—	—	—
1977–78	Calgary Wranglers	WCHL	53	8	22	10	2460	213	1	5.20	.865	—	—	—	—	—	—	—	—
1978–79	Calgary Wranglers	WHL	66	26	31	5	3595	309	1	5.16	.866	15	7	8	884	61	0	4.14	.892
1979–80	Calgary Wranglers	WHL	66	39	23	2	3724	261	1	4.21	.873	7	3	4	357	29	1	4.87	.864
1980–81	Flint Generals	IHL	47	—	—	—	2602	189	2	4.36	—	6	2	4	301	18	0	3.58	—
1980–81	New Brunswick Hawks	AHL	2	0	1	0	124	9	0	4.35	.827	—	—	—	—	—	—	—	—
1981–82	Chicago Black Hawks	NHL	1	0	1	0	59	5	0	5.05	.833	—	—	—	—	—	—	—	—
1981–82	New Brunswick Hawks	AHL	28	16	8	4	1644	70	3	2.55	—	2	0	2	90	6	0	4.00	—
1982–83	Birmingham South Stars	CHL	25	11	11	1	1450	81	1	3.35	.900	5	0	4	195	19	0	5.85	—
1982–83	Springfield Indians	AHL	13	3	6	0	592	49	0	4.97	.842	—	—	—	—	—	—	—	—
1983–84	Sherbrooke Jets	AHL	19	5	10	2	1048	88	0	5.04	.874	—	—	—	—	—	—	—	—
1983–84	Springfield Indians	AHL	14	3	11	0	756	67	0	5.32	.842	2	0	2	124	3	0	1.45	—
1984–85	Chicago Black Hawks	NHL	27	11	9	3	1396	75	2	3.23	.903	2	0	0	33	6	0	10.91	.786
1985–86	Chicago Black Hawks	NHL	1	0	1	0	60	6	0	6.00	.867	—	—	—	—	—	—	—	—
1985–86	Nova Scotia Oilers	AHL	32	11	14	2	1716	109	0	3.81	.872	—	—	—	—	—	—	—	—
1986–87	Chicago Blackhawks	NHL	3	1	0	1	155	7	0	2.71	.922	—	—	—	—	—	—	—	—
1986–87	Nova Scotia Oilers	AHL	32	12	15	3	1813	121	2	4.00	.872	—	—	—	—	—	—	—	—
1986–87	Saginaw Generals	IHL	6	4	1	0	319	21	0	3.95	.881	6	3	2	304	24	0	4.74	—
1987–88	Edmonton Oilers	NHL	3	0	0	0	60	7	0	6.98	.720	—	—	—	—	—	—	—	—
1987–88	Nova Scotia Oilers	AHL	46	25	15	5	2746	171	0	3.74	.882	5	1	4	305	22	0	4.33	.885
1988–89	Cape Breton Oilers	AHL	25	11	13	1	1497	111	0	4.45	.865	—	—	—	—	—	—	—	—
1988–89	Canadian National Team	Intl	22	8	9	1	1160	82	0	4.24	—	—	—	—	—	—	—	—	—
1989–90	Canadian National Team	Intl	41	18	17	0	2182	140	0	3.85	—	—	—	—	—	—	—	—	—
1990–91	Canadian National Team	Intl	2	2	0	0	120	5	0	5.00	—	—	—	—	—	—	—	—	—
AHL totals			211	84	93	16	11,936	795	5	4.00	—	9	1	8	519	31	0	3.58	—
NHL totals			35	12	11	4	1725	100	2	3.48	.896	2	0	0	33	6	0	10.91	.786

== Awards ==
- WHL Second All-Star Team – 1979
