= Len Ircandia =

Canadian ice hockey player

- Born: July 28, 1954 (age 70); Trail, British Columbia, Canada
- Height: 6 ft 0 in (183 cm)
- Weight: 190 lb (86 kg; 13 st 8 lb)
- Position: Defence
- Shot: Left
- Played for: Des Moines Capitols; Seattle Totems; Kalamazoo Wings; Tulsa Oilers; Kansas City Red Wings
- Playing career: 1974–1979

Len Ircandia (born July 28, 1954) is a former professional ice hockey defenceman.

Ircandia played five seasons of professional hockey (1974–79), appearing in 282 games in the International Hockey League with the Des Moines Capitols and the Kalamazoo Wings. He also played 34 games in the Central Hockey League with the Seattle Totems, Tulsa Oilers, and Kansas City Red Wings.
