= Robert Picard =

Canadian ice hockey player (born 1957)

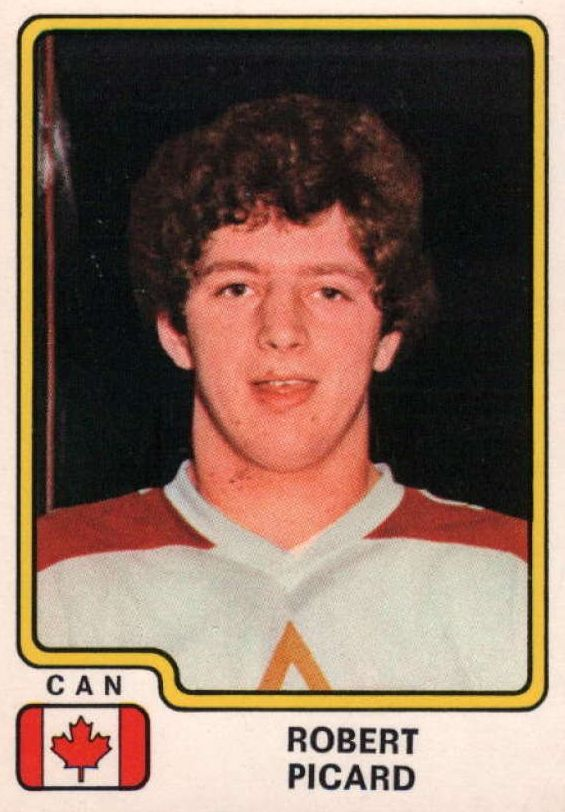
- Born: May 25, 1957 (age 69) Montreal, Quebec, Canada
- Height: 6 ft 02 in (188 cm)
- Weight: 205 lb (93 kg; 14 st 9 lb)
- Position: Defence
- Shot: Left
- Played for: Washington Capitals; Toronto Maple Leafs; Montreal Canadiens; Winnipeg Jets; Quebec Nordiques; Detroit Red Wings
- National team: Canada
- NHL draft: 3rd overall, 1977; Washington Capitals
- WHA draft: 38th overall, 1977; Quebec Nordiques
- Playing career: 1977–1990
Medal record
Representing Canada
Ice hockey
World Championships
Bronze medal – third place	1978 Prague

Robert Rene Joseph Picard (born May 25, 1957) is a Canadian former professional ice hockey player.

== Career ==
Robert Picard established himself as a highly regarded defensive prospect with the Montreal Juniors and Montreal Bleu Blanc Rouge from 1973 to 1977. He was selected 3rd overall by the Washington Capitals in the 1977 NHL entry draft.

In Washington, expectations were high due to the team's abysmal performance, and Picard was expected to single-handedly reverse the losing fortunes. Picard played well, but after three seasons of unrealistic expectations he was traded to Toronto in exchange for goaltender Mike Palmateer. Toronto management gave Picard little opportunity to show what he was capable of, sending him to his hometown Montreal Canadiens in exchange for Michel Larocque in March, 1981. In his hometown, the expectations were raised even higher and, as before, Picard, in his sensitivity, tried to do more than he could.

In 1983, he was traded to the Winnipeg Jets and was paired with fellow defender Randy Carlyle, with whom he found an opportunity to play within his means. The time in Winnipeg was good but short. Just over two seasons later, he was again on the move, this time to the Quebec Nordiques, where he was a regular on the blueline for four seasons before retiring after a 20-game stint with the Red Wings in 1990.

== Trivia ==
On November 4, 1983, Picard was traded to the Winnipeg Jets by the Montreal Canadiens for Winnipeg's 3rd round choice in the 1984 Entry Draft, Montreal would use that draft pick to select goaltender Patrick Roy, who would go on to a Hall of Fame career.

Robert Picard signed with the Capitals after he was drafted with the team’s first choice (third overall) in the 1977 NHL amateur draft. He later realized he could make more money in the World Hockey Association and signed a five-year deal for $625,000 with the WHA’s Quebec Nordiques in Sept., 1977. But the WHA barred Picard from playing with the Nords, realizing that the league would face a lawsuit from the NHL if he suited up. An angry and frustrated Picard said "I’d rather deliver pizzas in Quebec City" than play hockey in Washington. A few days later he reported for his first Capitals training camp.

== Career statistics ==
=== Regular season and playoffs ===
			Regular season					Playoffs
Season	Team	League	GP	G	A	Pts	PIM	GP	G	A	Pts	PIM
1973–74	Montreal Bleu Blanc Rouge	QMJHL	70	7	46	53	286	9	1	4	5	6
1974–75	Montreal Bleu Blanc Rouge	QMJHL	70	13	74	87	337	8	1	3	4	37
1975–76	Montreal Juniors	QMJHL	72	14	67	81	282	6	2	9	11	25
1976–77	Montreal Juniors	QMJHL	70	32	60	92	267	13	2	10	12	20
1977–78	Washington Capitals	NHL	75	10	27	37	101	—	—	—	—	—
1978–79	Washington Capitals	NHL	77	21	44	65	85	—	—	—	—	—
1979–80	Washington Capitals	NHL	78	11	43	54	122	—	—	—	—	—
1980–81	Toronto Maple Leafs	NHL	59	6	19	25	68	—	—	—	—	—
1980–81	Montreal Canadiens	NHL	8	2	2	4	6	1	0	0	0	0
1981–82	Montreal Canadiens	NHL	62	2	26	28	106	5	1	1	2	7
1982–83	Montreal Canadiens	NHL	64	7	31	38	60	3	0	0	0	0
1983–84	Montreal Canadiens	NHL	7	0	2	2	0	—	—	—	—	—
1983–84	Winnipeg Jets	NHL	62	6	16	22	34	3	0	0	0	12
1984–85	Winnipeg Jets	NHL	78	12	22	34	107	8	2	2	4	8
1985–86	Winnipeg Jets	NHL	20	2	5	7	17	—	—	—	—	—
1985–86	Quebec Nordiques	NHL	48	7	27	34	36	3	0	2	2	2
1986–87	Quebec Nordiques	NHL	78	8	20	28	71	13	2	10	12	10
1987–88	Quebec Nordiques	NHL	65	3	13	16	103	—	—	—	—	—
1988–89	Quebec Nordiques	NHL	74	7	14	21	61	—	—	—	—	—
1989–90	Quebec Nordiques	NHL	24	0	5	5	28	—	—	—	—	—
1989–90	Detroit Red Wings	NHL	20	0	3	3	20	—	—	—	—	—
NHL totals			899	104	319	423	1,025	36	5	15	20	39

=== International ===
Year	Team	Event	GP	G	A	Pts	PIM
1978	Canada	WC	10	1	2	3	4
1979	Canada	WC	7	0	0	0	2
Senior totals			17	1	2	3	6

Preceded by Greg Carroll	Washington Capitals first-round draft pick 1977	Succeeded by Ryan Walter
