= Kansas City Red Wings =

Defunct American ice hockey team in the Central Hockey League

- City: Kansas City, Missouri
- League: Central Hockey League
- Operated: 1977–1979
- Home arena: Kemper Arena
- Colors: Red and White
- Affiliates: Detroit Red Wings

Franchise history
- 1967–1972: Kansas City Blues
- 1976–1977: Kansas City Blues
- 1977–1979: Kansas City Red Wings

The Kansas City Red Wings were a professional hockey team that operated in the Central Hockey League for two seasons, 1977–78 and 1978-79. They were the top farm team of the NHL's Detroit Red Wings. They played in what was then called Kemper Arena in Kansas City, Missouri.

== 1977-78 season ==
The Kansas City Red Wings joined the CHL in the 1977-78 season. Coached by Larry Wilson, the team missed the playoffs with a 34-39-3 record for 71 points.

Dave Hanson (a.k.a. Jack Hanson, #16 of Slap Shot fame) played for the Kansas City Red Wings during the 1977-78 season.

== 1978-79 season ==
Coached by Larry Wilson, the team compiled a 37-36-3 record for 77 points and made the playoffs, only to lose in the first round.

== All-time roster ==
Name	Birthdate	Birthplace	Position	GP	G	A	Pts	PIMS	1977-78	1978-79
Fred Berry	1956-03-26	Stony Plain, AB	Center	65	11	14	25	79	X	-
Mike Bloom	1952-04-12	Ottawa, ON	Left winger	76	23	54	77	155	X	-
Dan Bolduc	1953-04-06	Waterville, ME	Left winger	23	21	11	32	11	-	X
Al Cameron	1955-10-21	Edmonton, AB	Defenseman	70	6	31	37	93	X	X
Roland Cloutier	1957-10-06	Rouyn-Noranda, QC	Center	129	50	67	117	34	X	X
Steve Coates	1950-07-27	Toronto, ON	Right winger	63	14	20	34	83	X	-
Mal Davis	1956-10-10	Lockeport, NS	Right winger	71	42	24	66	29	-	X
Mike Frawley	1954-04-09	Sturgeon Falls, ON	Goaltender	15	0	0	0	0	X	-
Larry Giroux	1951-08-28	Weyburn, SK	Defenseman	73	11	49	60	256	X	-
Lorry Gloeckner	1956-01-25	Kindersley, SK	Defenseman	51	0	17	17	44	-	X
Danny Gruen	1952-06-26	Thunder Bay, ON	Left winger	95	34	47	81	122	X	X
Jean Hamel	1952-06-06	Asbestos, QC	Defenseman	28	2	10	12	29	-	X
Clark Hamilton		Islington, ON	Center	69	12	7	19	56	X	X
Dave Hanson	1954-04-12	Cumberland, WI	Defenseman	15	0	0	0	41	X	-
Terry Harper	1940-01-27	Regina, SK	Defenseman	22	0	13	13	36	-	X
John Hilworth	1957-05-23	Jasper, AB	Defenseman	105	5	22	27	226	X	X
Willie Huber	1958-01-15	Strasskirchen, Ger.	Defenseman	10	2	7	9	12	-	X
Len Ircandia	1954-07-28	Trail, BC	Defenseman	1	0	0	0	2	X	-
Dave Johns			Goaltender	2	0	0	0	0	-	X
Bob Krieger	1952-10-05	Edina, Minnesota	Right winger	2	0	0	0	0	X	-
Fern LeBlanc	1956-01-12	Baie Comeau, QC	Left winger	104	44	47	91	53	X	X
Jean-Paul LeBlanc	1946-10-20	South Durham, QC	Center	118	40	68	108	114	X	X
Sylvain Locas	1958-02-17	Chicoutimi, QC	Center	75	27	34	61	92	-	X
Ron Low	1950-06-21	Birtle, MB	Goaltender	63	0	3	3	2	-	X
Jim Malazdrewicz	1958-03-11	Winnipeg, MB	Right winger	74	32	24	56	11	-	X
Don Martineau	1952-04-25	Kimberley, BC	Right winger	61	16	15	31	31	-	X
Brian McCutcheon	1949-08-03	Toronto, ON	Forward	60	17	16	33	27	-	X
Al McDonough	1950-06-06	St. Catharines, ON	Right winger	52	18	24	42	14	X	-
Jim Nahrgang	1951-04-17	Millbank, ON	Defenseman	9	0	3	3	13	X	-
Ted Nolan	1958-04-07	Sault Ste. Marie, ON	Left winger	73	12	38	50	66	-	X
Rob Plumb	1957-08-29	Kingston, ON	Center	99	35	31	66	50	X	X
Jack Rankin	1953-05-23	San Diego, CA	Defenseman	5	0	2	2	0	X	-
Terry Richardson	1953-05-07	New Westminster, BC	Goaltender	63	0	3	3	21	X	-
Bob Ritchie	1955-02-20	Temiscaming, QC	Left winger	52	15	21	36	16	X	-
Tom Ross	1954-01-17	Detroit, MI	Center	1	0	0	0	0	-	X
Derek Sanderson	1946-06-16	Niagara Falls, ON	Center	4	1	3	4	0	X	-
Kevin Schamehorn	1956-07-28	Victoria, BC	Right winger	36	5	3	8	X	-	
Dwight Schofield	1956-03-25	Lynn, MA	Defenseman	35	4	11	15	78	X	X
Tim Sheehy	1948-09-03	International Falls, MN	Center	16	2	6	8	4	X	-
Steve Short				51	3	11	14	216	-	X
Bjorn Skaare				37	8	26	34	18	-	X
Alan Stoneman	1958-03-01	Kansas City, MO	Defenseman	7	0	3	3	9	-	X
Ron Strelive	1961-03-16	Toronto, ON	Goaltender	13	0	0	0	17	-	X
John Taft	1958-03-08	Minneapolis, MN	Defenseman	132	13	46	59	73	X	X
Rick Vasko	1957-01-12	St. Catharines, ON	Defenseman	145	32	68	100	139	X	X
Fred Williams	1956-07-01	Saskatoon, SK	Center	32	0	6	6	12	X	-
Randy Wilson	1957-08-28	East Providence, RI	Winger	13	4	7	11	4	-	X
Larry Wright	1951-10-08	Regina, SK	Center	51	6	24	30	17	-	X
