= Danny Lecours =

Canadian ice hockey player

- Born: October 5, 1955 (age 71) Princeville, Quebec, Canada
- Height: 5 ft 6 in (168 cm)
- Weight: 165 lb (75 kg; 11 st 11 lb)
- Position: Left wing
- Shot: Left
- Played for: IHL; Milwaukee Admirals
- NHL draft: Undrafted
- Playing career: 1977–1987

Danny Lecours (born October 5, 1955) is a Canadian retired professional ice hockey player.

Born in 1955 in Princeville, Quebec, Lecours played three seasons in the Quebec Major Junior Hockey League with the Quebec Remparts and Chicoutimi Saguenéens. Lecours also played two seasons in the semi-pro USHL (with the Milwaukee Admirals) before he began his professional career in 1977 with the Milwaukee Admirals of the International Hockey League where over nine seasons he played 554 regular season games and registered 360 goals and 282 assists for 642 points, while earning 345 penalty minutes. Lecours also played 45 playoff games for the Admirals, scoring 16 goals and 15 assists for 31 points, with 27 minutes in penalties.

== Achievements ==
Lecours, who once told the team's management that he "didn't want to play for any team that was going to trade him", played his entire professional career with the Milwaukee Admirals. At the time of his retirement, following the 1986-87 season, Lecours held the IHL record for most goals in a season with 75, and he also held 16 Admirals team records. He continues to hold onto several of his team records including:

Most Goals in one season: 75 during the 1982–83
Most Career Goals
Most Career points
Most Career games

== Honours ==
On January 4, 1987, in a pre-game ceremony, the Milwaukee Admirals retired Danny Lecours sweater #27.

On April 13, 2013, as part of the Admirals celebrating their 35th season, Lecours was named the 2nd greatest Milwaukee Admiral of all time as voted by fans, behind only Pekka Rinne.
