= 1976–77 QMJHL season =

Canadian junior ice hockey season

The 1976–77 QMJHL season was the eighth season in the history of the Quebec Major Junior Hockey League. The league renamed its divisions in honour of Robert Lebel and Frank Dilio, two lifetime contributors to ice hockey in Quebec. The East Division became the "Dilio Division" and the West Division became the "Lebel Division." Ten teams played 72 games each in the schedule. The Quebec Remparts finished first overall in the regular season to capture the Jean Rougeau Trophy. The Sherbrooke Castors won the President's Cup defeating the Quebec Remparts in the finals.

== Team changes ==
- The Hull Festivals were renamed the Hull Olympiques.

== Final standings ==
Note: GP = Games played; W = Wins; L = Losses; T = Ties; PTS = Points; GF = Goals for; GA = Goals against

Dilio Division	GP	W	L	T	Pts	GF	GA
Quebec Remparts	72	41	21	10	92	380	287
Chicoutimi Saguenéens	72	42	24	6	90	393	357
Trois-Rivières Draveurs	72	38	24	10	86	443	350
Shawinigan Dynamos	72	18	42	12	48	265	357
Sorel Éperviers	72	19	48	5	43	319	448

Lebel Division	GP	W	L	T	Pts	GF	GA
Sherbrooke Castors	72	40	23	9	89	392	311
Cornwall Royals	72	38	24	10	86	345	281
Laval National	72	26	35	11	63	325	363
Montreal Juniors	72	27	37	8	62	310	368
Hull Olympiques	72	26	37	9	61	283	333

- complete list of standings.

== Scoring leaders ==
Note: GP = Games played; G = Goals; A = Assists; Pts = Points; PIM = Penalties in minutes

Player	Team	GP	G	A	Pts	PIM
Jean Savard	Quebec Remparts	72	84	96	180	110
Sylvain Locas	Chicoutimi Saguenéens	72	59	98	157	101
Norm Dupont	Montreal Juniors	71	70	83	153	52
Richard Dalpe	Trois-Rivières Draveurs	72	58	93	151	32
Eddy Godin	Quebec Remparts	72	62	83	145	83
Jere Gillis	Sherbrooke Castors	72	55	85	140	80
Kevin Reeves	Montreal Juniors	72	48	87	135	16
Lucien DeBlois	Sorel Éperviers	72	56	78	134	131
Yves Richer	Trois-Rivières Draveurs	72	45	89	134	38
Roland Cloutier	Trois-Rivières Draveurs	72	63	68	131	43

- complete scoring statistics

== Playoffs ==
Ron Carter was the leading scorer of the playoffs with 30 points (12 goals, 18 assists).

Quarterfinals

- Quebec Remparts defeated Hull Olympiques 4 games to 0,.
- Montreal Juniors defeated Chicoutimi Saguenéens 4 games to 3, 1 tie.
- Sherbrooke Castors defeated Laval National 4 games to 3.
- Cornwall Royals defeated Trois-Rivières Draveurs 4 games to 2.

Semifinals

- Quebec Remparts defeated Montreal Juniors 4 games to 0, 1 tie.
- Sherbrooke Castors defeated Cornwall Royals 4 games to 1, 1 tie.

Finals

- Sherbrooke Castors defeated Quebec Remparts 4 games to 1.

== All-star teams ==
First team

- Goaltender - Tim Bernhardt, Cornwall Royals
- Left defence - Robert Picard, Montreal Juniors
- Right defence - Graeme Nicolson, Cornwall Royals
- Left winger - Jere Gillis, Sherbrooke Castors
- Centreman - Jean Savard, Quebec Remparts
- Right winger - Lucien Deblois, Sorel Éperviers
- Coach - Yvan Gingras, Chicoutimi Saguenéens

Second team

- Goaltender - Jean Belisle, Chicoutimi Saguenéens
- Left defence - Alain Myette, Shawinigan Dynamos
- Right defence - Mario Marois, Quebec Remparts
- Left winger - Normand Dupont, Montreal Juniors
- Centreman - Sylvain Locas, Chicoutimi Saguenéens
- Right winger - Mike Bossy, Laval National
- Coach - Michel Bergeron, Trois-Rivières Draveurs
- List of First/Second/Rookie team all-stars.

== Trophies and awards ==
Team

- President's Cup - Playoff Champions, Sherbrooke Castors
- Jean Rougeau Trophy - Regular Season Champions, Quebec Remparts

Player

- Michel Brière Memorial Trophy - Most Valuable Player, Lucien Deblois, Sorel Éperviers
- Jean Béliveau Trophy - Top Scorer, Jean Savard, Quebec Remparts
- Jacques Plante Memorial Trophy - Best GAA, Tim Bernhardt, Cornwall Royals
- Emile Bouchard Trophy - Defenceman of the Year, Robert Picard, Montreal Juniors
- Michel Bergeron Trophy - Rookie of the Year, Rick Vaive, Sherbrooke Castors
- Frank J. Selke Memorial Trophy - Most sportsmanlike player, Mike Bossy, Laval National Juniors

== See also ==
- 1977 Memorial Cup
- 1977 NHL entry draft
- 1976–77 OMJHL season
- 1976–77 WCHL season

Preceded by 1975–76 QMJHL season	QMJHL seasons	Succeeded by 1977–78 QMJHL season
