= New Brunswick Hawks =

Defunct American Hockey League team

- City: Moncton, New Brunswick
- League: American Hockey League
- Operated: 1978–1982
- Home arena: Moncton Coliseum
- Colours: Blue, white
- Owners: Maple Leaf Gardens Limited, Chicago Black Hawks
- Affiliates: Chicago Black Hawks; Toronto Maple Leafs

Franchise history
- 1978–1982: New Brunswick Hawks
- 1982–1986: St. Catharines Saints
- 1986–1991: Newmarket Saints
- 1991–2005: St. John's Maple Leafs
- 2005–present: Toronto Marlies

Championships
- Regular season titles: 1 (1981–82)
- Division titles: 2 (1979–80, 1981–82)
- Calder Cups: 1 (1981–82)

The New Brunswick Hawks were a professional ice hockey team based in Moncton, New Brunswick. Home games were played at the Moncton Coliseum. They were a member of the American Hockey League (AHL) between 1978 and 1982. The Hawks operated as a minor league affiliate of the Chicago Black Hawks and the Toronto Maple Leafs, with a winning record each of four seasons.

The Hawks won the F. G. "Teddy" Oke Trophy twice for regular season division championships in 1979–80, and 1981–82. New Brunswick finished first overall in 1981–82, and won the Calder Cup by defeating the Binghamton Whalers four games to one in the finals. In the summer of 1982, the Black Hawks pulled out of the team and the Maple Leafs moved the franchise to St. Catharines, Ontario to establish the St. Catharines Saints as their farm team. However, the same off-season the Edmonton Oilers purchased an AHL franchise and formed the Moncton Alpines to replace the departed team.

== History ==
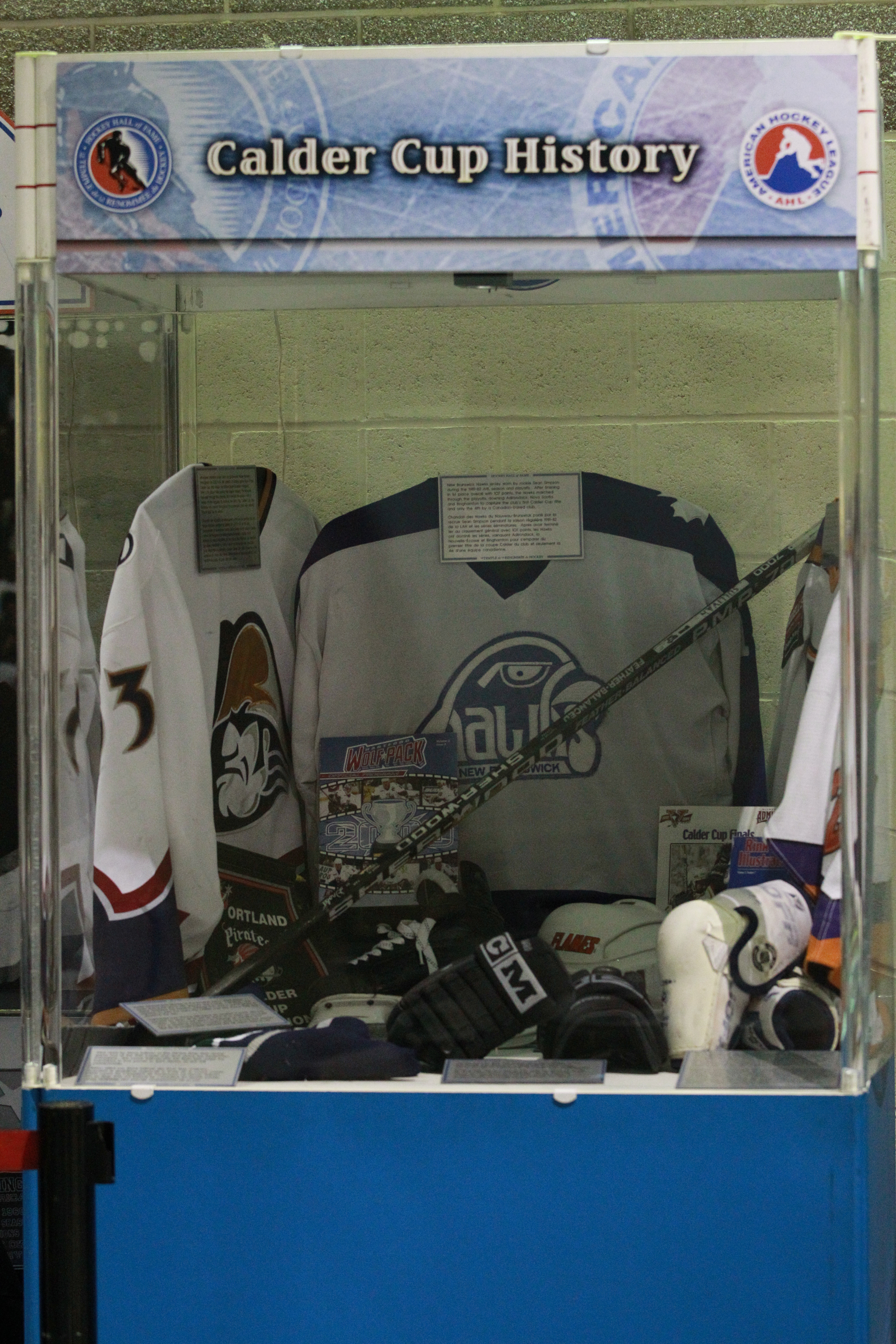
A New Brunswick Hawks jersey on display

The Moncton-based New Brunswick Hawks were established in 1978 as members of the American Hockey League (AHL), and were jointly operated by the Chicago Black Hawks and the Toronto Maple Leafs as their farm team. Maple Leaf Gardens Limited (MLGL) and the Black Hawks each owned half of the franchise.

By 1980, Harold Ballard, owner of the Leafs, had decided that they needed a developmental team of their own, with a spokesperson citing the limited number of roster spots as the rationale for the move. MLGL launched the Cincinnati Tigers in the old Central Hockey League in 1981 to serve as their own affiliate, while retaining their share of the New Brunswick Hawks. However, after the Tigers averaged only 1,500 fans and lost $750,000 in their first season, the Leafs folded the Tigers in the spring of 1982. That same summer, with Chicago having already pulled out of New Brunswick in favour of affiliating with the Springfield Indians on their own, the Maple Leafs announced that they would not operate the team in Moncton the following year after they couldn't come to terms with the city on a new arena lease, even though the team had the fifth highest attendance in the league.

The Maple Leafs wanted to relocate the team closer to Toronto, with both St. Catharines and Niagara Falls in Ontario potential destinations for the franchise. When MLGL applied to the AHL to relocate the New Brunswick Hawks to St. Catharines, the nearby Buffalo Sabres initially blocked the move due to objections to a team moving into their territory without prior discussions with them. However, following protests by fans in St. Catharines and threats by Ballard to suspend the Moncton franchise to prevent another AHL team from playing in the city and to sue the Sabres and NHL for $20 million, the relocation was approved unanimously and the franchise became the St. Catharines Saints, serving as the Maple Leafs' primary affiliate. At the same AHL Board of Governors meeting, the Edmonton Oilers received approval to purchase a new AHL franchise to replace the departed Hawks in Moncton, leading to establishment of the Moncton Alpines as their affiliate that fall.

== Coaches ==
- 1978–79 – Eddie Johnston
- 1979–80 – Joe Crozier & Lou Angotti
- 1980–81 – Doug Carpenter
- 1981–82 – Orval Tessier

== Players ==
Rocky Saganiuk won the Les Cunningham Award in 1978–79 as the league's Most Valuable Player, in its inaugural season. The following season in 1979–80, Darryl Sutter won the Dudley "Red" Garrett Memorial Award as Rookie of the Year. Sutter went on to have a career in the NHL, with the Chicago Blackhawks. He later became head coach of the Los Angeles Kings. Four different players were honoured in 1981–82 with league awards. Mike Kaszycki won three awards, the Les Cunningham Award as most valuable player, the John B. Sollenberger Trophy as top scorer, and the Fred T. Hunt Memorial Award for sportsmanship and perseverance. Dave Farrish was voted top defenceman winning the Eddie Shore Award, and goaltenders Bob Janecyk & Warren Skorodenski won the Harry "Hap" Holmes Memorial Award for the league's lowest goals against average. Jack O'Callahan, who was a member of the 1980 Winter Olympics United States "Miracle on Ice" national team, played two seasons for the New Brunswick Hawks before playing for the Chicago Blackhawks in the NHL.

=== American Hockey League Hall of Famers ===
AHL Hall of Fame Honored Members
Name	Seasons	Induction Year
Bruce Boudreau	1978-81 (player)	2009
Joe Crozier	1979-80 (head coach)	2012

== Season-by-season results ==
=== Regular season ===
Season	Games	Won	Lost	Tied	Points	Goals for	Goals against	Standing
1978–79	80	41	29	10	92	315	288	2nd, North
1979–80	79	44	27	8	96	325	271	1st, North
1980–81	80	37	33	10	84	317	298	2nd, North
1981–82	80	48	21	11	107	338	227	1st, North

=== Playoffs ===
Season	1st round	2nd round	Finals
1978–79	L, 2-3, Nova Scotia	—	—
1979–80	W, 4-1, Adirondack	W, 4-2, Maine	L, 2-4, Hershey
1980–81	W, 4-2, Nova Scotia	L, 3-4, Maine	—
1981–82	W, 3-2, Adirondack	W, 4-1, Nova Scotia	W, 4-1, Binghamton

== See also ==
- List of ice hockey teams in New Brunswick
