= Montreal Bleu Blanc Rouge =

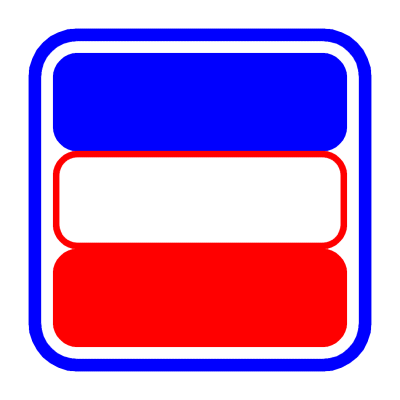
- City: Montreal, Quebec
- League: Quebec Major Junior Hockey League
- Operated: 1972 to 1975
- Home arena: Montreal Forum
- Colours: Blue, White and Red

Franchise history
- 1933–1972: Montreal Junior Canadiens
- 1972–1975: Montreal Bleu Blanc Rouge
- 1975–1982: Montreal Juniors
- 1982–1984: Verdun Juniors
- 1984–1989: Verdun Junior Canadiens
- 1989–1996: Saint-Hyacinthe Laser
- 1996–present: Rouyn-Noranda Huskies

The Montreal Bleu Blanc Rouge (Blue, White and Red in English) were a junior ice hockey team in the Quebec Major Junior Hockey League from 1972 to 1975. (Note: Some sources state the team changed its name to the Montreal Juniors following the 1973 season, while other sources continued to use the Bleu Blanc Rouge name the following season.) They played at the Montreal Forum in Montreal, Quebec, Canada. A pre-existing franchise named the Montreal Junior Canadiens that played in the Ontario Hockey Association made the switch to the QMJHL for the 1972–73 season. They finished seventh and were knocked out in the quarterfinals of the playoffs.

== History ==
The Montreal Junior Canadiens were one of the dominant teams of the Quebec Amateur Hockey Association until joining the Ontario Hockey Association (OHA) in 1961. The Montreal team was allowed to play in the OHA due to an agreement between the league and the Quebec hockey association and the Canadian Amateur Hockey Association. During this period, the Junior Canadiens were accused by the Quebec hockey associations (including the newly formed Quebec Major Junior Hockey League (QMJHL)) of poaching all of the excellent junior talent in the province. As a result, with two years left in the agreement, the Quebec hockey association put pressure on the owners of the franchise to return to Quebec and join the QMJHL, despite the protests of the team's president and general manager, Phil Wimmer. In May 1972, the Junior Canadiens suspended operations in the OHA for one-year.

In June it was announced that the Junior Canadiens franchise was purchased by the Entreprises Sportif de Montreal group headed by Jules Duchesneau that the team would move to the QMHJHL for the 1972–73 season. Wimmer was replaced as general manager by Roger Bedard. The team was renamed Montreal Bleu Blanc Rouge in September 1972 and played at the Montreal Forum. However, neither the team nor any of its players returned to the OHA. Headed by star Mario Tremblay, the team made its first major acquisition in the QMJHL when they acquired forward Robert Sirois in October from the Laval National to help their offence. They also sold the league's top goaltender, Pierre Pérousse, to the Quebec Remparts. In their only season, the team won 26 games, lost 35 and drew three, earning 55 points and finished seventh in the standings. During the season, one of the team's goaltenders, Louis Laliberté, suffered a major eye injury after being struck by a shot and underwent two operations and never played hockey again. The team advanced to the playoffs where they were eliminated by the Cornwall Royals in the quarterfinals in their only appearance. In some sources, the team was renamed the Montreal Juniors, while others continued to use the Bleu Blanc Rouge name.

== Players ==
According to Elite Prospects, the team's all-time games played, goals, points, and penalty minutes leader was André St. Laurent with 64, 52, 100, and 245 respectively. Michel Bélisle is the team's leader in assists.

According to Hockeydb, if all three seasons are included, Norm Dupont is the all-time goals and points leader for the Montreal Bleu Blanc Rouge. He played 142 games, scoring 139 goals and 283 points. Jean-Luc Phaneuf is the all-time games played and assists leader with 182 and 172 respectively and Robert Picard is the all time penalty minutes leader with 623.

=== Award winners ===
Jean Béliveau Trophy
(Top Scorer)

- 1974–75 Normand Dupont

Frank J. Selke Commemorative Trophy
(Most Sportsmanlike Player)

- 1974–75 Jean-Luc Phaneuf

=== NHL alumni ===
- Mike Backman
- Rick Bowness
- Michel Dion
- Norm Dupont
- Dave Logan
- Gilles Lupien
- Garth MacGuigan
- Blair MacKasey
- Mike McDougall
- Pierre Mondou
- Robert Picard
- Jean Savard
- Bob Sirois
- Andre St. Laurent
- Mario Tremblay
- Mike Wong

== Yearly results ==
=== Regular season ===
Season	Games	Won	Lost	Tied	Points	Pct %	Goals for	Goals against	Standing
1972–73	64	26	35	3	55	0.430	297	319	7th QMJHL
1973–74	70	43	24	3	89	0.636	443	320	2nd West
1974–75	72	40	25	7	87	0.604	462	338	2nd West

=== Playoffs ===
- 1973 Lost to Cornwall Royals 4 games to 0 in quarter-finals.
- 1974 Defeated Sherbrooke Castors 4 games to 1 in quarter-finals.
  Lost to Sorel Eperviers 4 games to 0 in semi-finals.
- 1975 Defeated Cornwall Royals 4 games to 0 in quarter-finals.
  Lost to Laval National 4 games to 1 in semi-finals.

== Sources ==
- D'Auteuil, Jean-Pierre; Otis, Jean-Philippe (2012). La Ligue de Hockey Majeur du Québec: Depuis Lafleur, en passant par Lemieux et Crosby! (in French). Quebec: Éditions Caractėre. ISBN 978-2-89642-662-1.
- "Montréal R.W.B". Elite Prospects.
- Fontaine, Patrice (2016). Dictionnaire La Presse des sports du Québec (in French). Montreal: Éditions Libre Expression. ISBN 2-89111-666-6.
- "Montreal Red White and Blue all-time player list". Hockeydb.com.
