= Milwaukee Admirals =

American Hockey League team in Milwaukee, Wisconsin

- City: Milwaukee
- League: American Hockey League
- Conference: Western
- Division: Central
- Founded: 1970
- Home arena: UW–Milwaukee Panther Arena
- Colors
- Owners: Group headed by Harris Turer
- General manager: Scott Nichol
- Head coach: Karl Taylor
- Captain: Kevin Gravel
- Media: WVTV-DT2 "My 24"; Fox Sports 920; Milwaukee Journal Sentinel; AHL.TV (Internet)
- Affiliates: Nashville Predators (NHL); Atlanta Gladiators (ECHL)

Franchise history
- 1970: Milwaukee Wings
- 1970–present: Milwaukee Admirals

Championships
- Regular season titles: 2 AHL (2003–04, 2019–20)
- Division titles: 1 USHL (1976–77); 4 IHL (1982–83, 1992–93, 1994–95, 1995–96); 8 AHL (2003–04, 2005–06, 2008–09, 2010–11, 2015–16, 2019–20, 2023–24, 2024–25)
- Conference titles: 2 (2003–04),(2005–06)
- Calder Cups: 1 (2003–04)
- Playoff championships: 1 USHL title (1975–76)

The Milwaukee Admirals are a professional ice hockey team based in Milwaukee. They are the American Hockey League (AHL) affiliate of the National Hockey League (NHL)'s Nashville Predators. They play their homes games at the University of Wisconsin–Milwaukee Panther Arena.

The team has been playing since 1970, originally as an amateur team called the Milwaukee Wings, but were renamed the Admirals after their first season. They played an independent schedule until joining the semiprofessional United States Hockey League (USHL) in 1973. In 1977, the Admirals joined the International Hockey League (IHL) when the USHL transitioned to a junior league. When the IHL ceased operations in 2001, the Admirals joined the AHL.

== History ==
=== Independent era ===
The Admirals first took to the ice in the winter of 1970 as an amateur club known as the Milwaukee Wings. Sponsored by the Wisconsin Citizens Benefit Association, they lost their first game on January 25 when the Madison All-Stars beat them 17–7. They got their first win five days later when they defeated the Milwaukee Winter Club 10–8. They finished the season with 8 wins and 7 loses.

The next year the team was sold by the original owner Reed Fansher to a group of investors. One of the investors, Erwin J. Merar, owned an appliance store and the team was renamed the "Admirals" after a brand of household appliances sold in Merar's store.

=== United States Hockey League era ===
Beginning with the 1973–74 season the Admirals joined the United States Hockey League. Their first season in a league was not particularly successful as they ended the season in last place in their division. They won only 11 games, lost 35, and tied two games that season.

The Admirals won the USHL league championship in 1976, winning seven straight games in the league's playoffs. In the off-season, the team was purchased by former Chicago Blackhawks announcer Lloyd Pettit and his wife, Jane Bradley Pettit.

=== International Hockey League era ===
For the 1977–78 season the Admirals joined the International Hockey League as the USHL was becoming a strictly amateur league. The Admirals appeared in the IHL's Turner Cup finals only once (1983), where they lost to Toledo in six games.

=== American Hockey League era ===
The Admirals, along with five other IHL franchises, joined the American Hockey League for the 2001-02 AHL season when the IHL ceased operations. The team was allowed to keep their nickname despite the presence of the Norfolk Admirals in the AHL, as Milwaukee had used the nickname since 1970, well before the Norfolk team was established as the Hampton Roads Admirals in the ECHL. (In the 2015–16 season, that AHL franchise moved to the AHL's Pacific Division as the fourth incarnation of the San Diego Gulls, and a Norfolk club was re-established in the ECHL.)

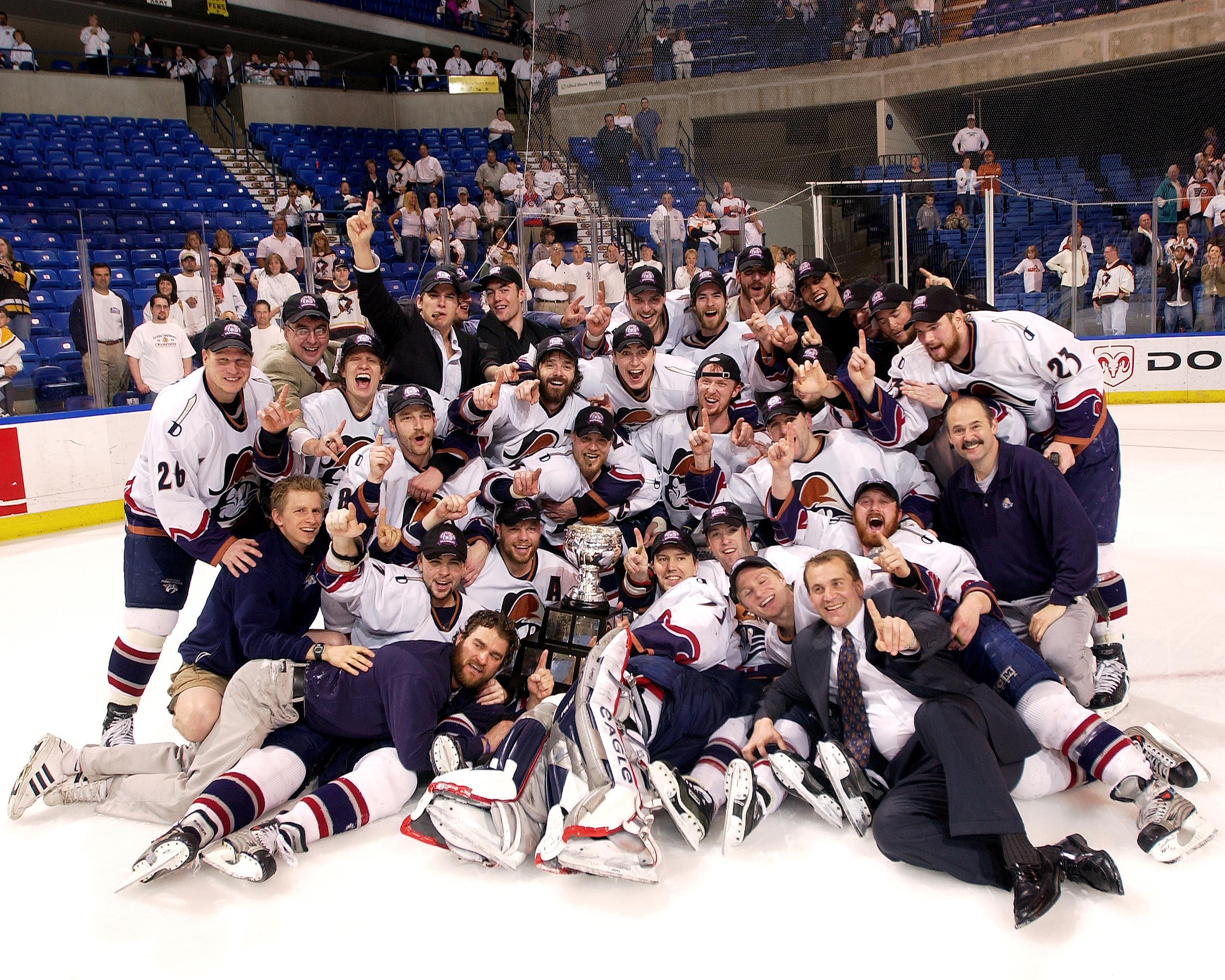
2003-04 Admirals with the Calder Cup

They won their first Calder Cup in 2004 when they defeated the Wilkes-Barre/Scranton Penguins. Prior to the finals, Milwaukee needed seven games to defeat the Cincinnati Mighty Ducks in the first round. Then the Admirals defeated the Chicago Wolves in six games to advance to the conference finals. The Admirals then eliminated the Rochester Americans four games to one. Milwaukee went on to sweep the Wilkes-Barre/Scranton Penguins to win the Calder Cup. The Admirals completed a rare postseason run in which they needed one fewer game to eliminate their opponents in each subsequent series.

The Admirals were purchased in June 2005 by a group of investors, led by Harris J. Turer, including Milwaukee Brewers owner Mark Attanasio, assistant general manager Gord Ash, and pitcher Ben Sheets. The Brewers subsequently became the sole uniform sponsor of the Admirals, and the Admirals wear a Brewers logo patch on their sweaters.

The Admirals won their second division title as a member of the American Hockey League in 2006, clinching the title on the last day of their schedule with a win over the Grand Rapids Griffins.

In the 2006 Calder Cup playoffs after narrowly winning a seven-game playoff series over the Iowa Stars, Milwaukee swept both the Houston Aeros and Grand Rapids Griffins to advance to their second Calder Cup final series. To their disappointment, the Admirals would lose in six games to the Hershey Bears.

On August 1, 2006, the Admirals unveiled a new logo and a change in color scheme from the traditional red-and-blue to black, white, and light blue. They used this logo until 2015, when the Admirals unveiled another new logo, keeping the Lake Michigan blue from 2006, but replaced black with navy blue. Also, the skeleton motif was kept with the hat that adorns the skeleton's head as a callback to the Admirals logos used from 1976 to 1997. This logo received very positive reviews, resulting in it becoming SportsLogos.net's 2015 Best New Primary Logo of the Year.

On March 16, 2016, Milwaukee Admirals owner/CEO Harris Turer along with Wisconsin Center District (WCD) announced that the Admirals signed a 10-year contract, bringing the Admirals to the University of Wisconsin–Milwaukee Panther Arena for the 2016-17 AHL season. This 10-year contract also results in a $6.4 million investment to bring the arena up to AHL standards with the Admirals contributing two million and the rest being supplied by the Wisconsin Center District.

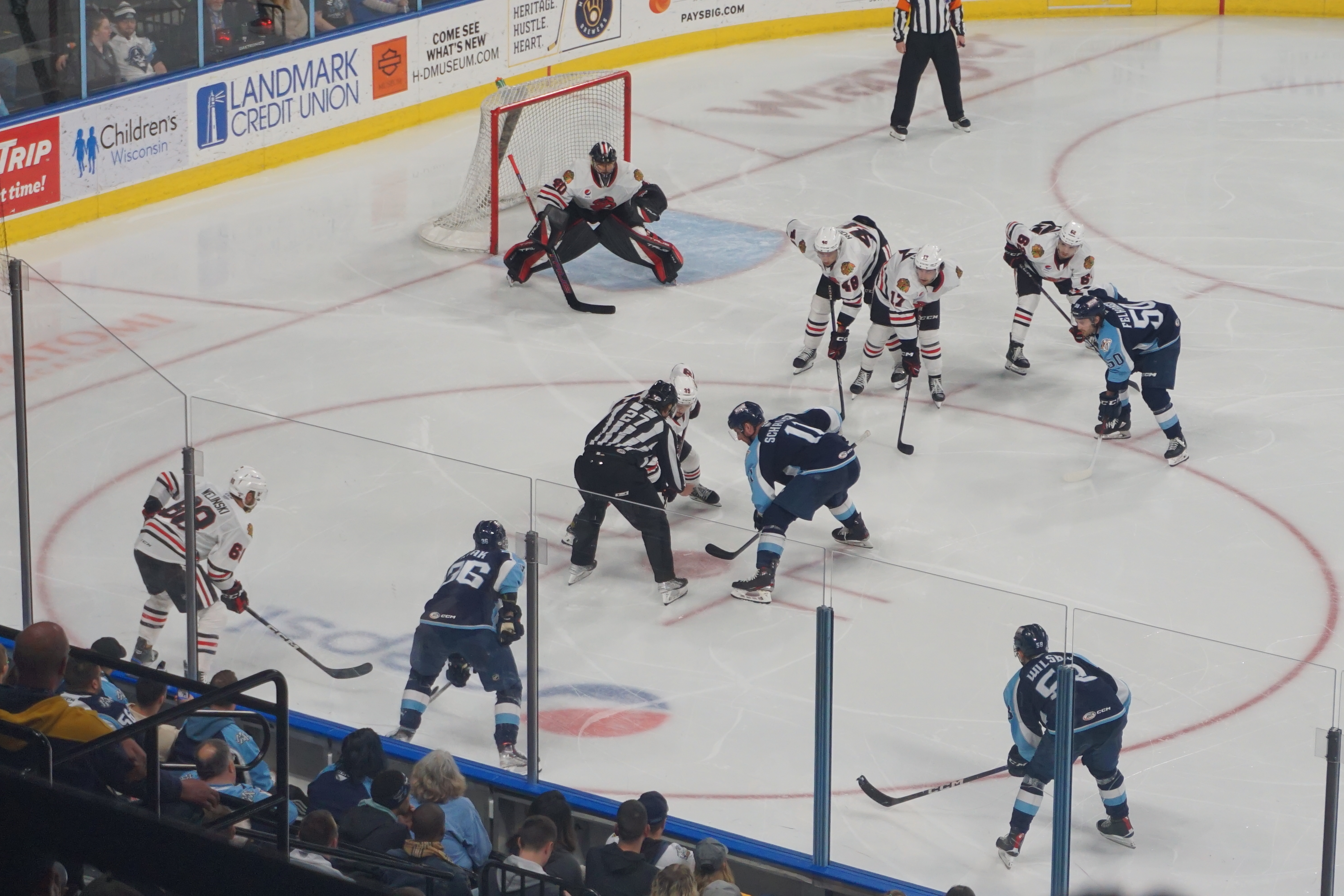
Milwaukee hosting the Rockford IceHogs in 2023

The team won its second regular season championship in the 2019–20 season, which was curtailed by the COVID-19 pandemic. Due to the ongoing restrictions during the pandemic, the Admirals were one of three teams that opted out of the 2020–21 AHL season. After the Admirals announced their season was cancelled, team ownership also announced that all of their full-time employees would still be paid for the year.

On November 17, 2023, the Admirals made history when defenseman Luke Prokop made his AHL debut as the first openly gay player in the league's history.

During the 2023-24 season, the Admirals set a new franchise record of 19 consecutive wins, which is also the second-longest winning streak in AHL history as of 2024. The winning streak lasted from January 5, 2024, which was also their first game of the calendar year, until February 25.

== Team information ==
=== League membership ===
- 1970–1973: independent
- 1973–1977: United States Hockey League
- 1977–2001: International Hockey League
- 2001–present: American Hockey League

=== NHL affiliation ===
The Admirals have been the top-level affiliate of the Nashville Predators since that team's founding in 1998.

"I like to say that for our players, the road to Nashville runs through Milwaukee and a look at our roster illustrates this. (T)his is the kind of environment that we want our prospects to develop in."

— Nashville General Manager David Poile

Coincidentally, the two cities' baseball franchises share a reverse affiliation, as the Nashville Sounds are the Triple-A affiliate of the Milwaukee Brewers.

During the 2006–07 season, the Admirals were also part of an unusual affiliation agreement with the Edmonton Oilers, who used five partial affiliates in the AHL for the 2006–07 season. These five affiliates included the Milwaukee Admirals, the Grand Rapids Griffins, the Iowa Stars, the Wilkes-Barre/Scranton Penguins, and the Hamilton Bulldogs. This arrangement lasted one season, as the Oilers announced a three-year affiliation with the Springfield Falcons on March 19, 2007.

=== Mascot ===
During the 1998 Admirals rebranding efforts, the Admirals created a new mascot, named Roscoe. Roscoe is a "sea dog"-like animal with bright orange fur, a hockey puck-shaped nose, and wears a bicorne admiral's hat along with an Admirals jersey with the number 98, representing the year Roscoe joined the Admirals organization.

At times during breaks and intermission, Roscoe will also ride a zamboni modified to look like a pirate ship. When interacting with fans, Roscoe will sometimes take souvenir hockey pucks from fans and place them on his nose.

In 2014, when the Nashville Predators' mascot, Gnash, got injured, Roscoe was "called up" to the Predators and to the NHL, joining with other mascots to entertain fans in Nashville while Gnash recovered.

== Season-by-season results ==
Legend: — – round did not exist at the time

| Regular season | | | | | | | | | | | | Playoffs | | | | | |
| Season | Games | Won | Lost | Tied | OTL | SOL | Points | PCT | Goals for | Goals against | Standing | Year | Qualifying | 1st round Opening Round | 2nd round Quarterfinals | 3rd round Semifinals | Finals |
|---|---|---|---|---|---|---|---|---|---|---|---|---|---|---|---|---|---|
| 1970 | 15 | 8 | 7 | 0 | — | — | 16 | .533 | | | — | — | | | | | |
| 1970–71 | 22 | 14 | 7 | 1 | — | — | 29 | .659 | | | — | — | | | | | |
| 1971–72 | 24 | 11 | 12 | 1 | — | — | 23 | .479 | 167 | 117 | — | — | | | | | |
| 1972–73 | 32 | 26 | 5 | 1 | — | — | 53 | .828 | 228 | 145 | — | — | | | | | |
| 1973–74 | 48 | 11 | 35 | 2 | — | — | 24 | .250 | 192 | 318 | 5th, Southern | 1974 | — | | | Did not qualify | |
| 1974–75 | 48 | 18 | 30 | 0 | — | — | 36 | .375 | 241 | 288 | 3rd, Southern | 1975 | — | | | Did not qualify | |
| 1975–76 | 48 | 23 | 25 | 0 | — | — | 46 | .479 | 279 | 270 | 3rd, Southern | 1976 | — | | W, 2–0, SC | W, 2–0, TC | W, 3–0, GB |
| 1976–77 | 48 | 23 | 23 | 2 | — | — | 48 | .500 | 231 | 241 | 1st, Southern | 1977 | — | | | W, 2–0–2, GB | L, 1–2–3, GR |
| 1977–78 | 80 | 27 | 38 | 15 | — | — | 69 | .431 | 257 | 299 | 3rd, South | 1978 | — | | L, 1–4, TOL | — | — |
| 1978–79 | 80 | 21 | 48 | 11 | — | — | 53 | .331 | 260 | 391 | 4th, South | 1979 | — | | L, 3–4, GRO | — | — |
| 1979–80 | 80 | 29 | 41 | 10 | — | — | 68 | .425 | 327 | 402 | 3rd, South | 1980 | — | | L, 0–4, SAG | — | — |
| 1980–81 | 82 | 32 | 35 | 15 | — | — | 79 | .482 | 354 | 371 | 3rd, West | 1981 | — | | L, 3–4, FWK | — | — |
| 1981–82 | 82 | 41 | 34 | 7 | — | — | 91 | .543 | 385 | 351 | 2nd, IHL | 1982 | — | | L, 1–4, SAG | — | — |
| 1982–83 | 82 | 43 | 30 | 9 | — | — | 98 | .579 | 407 | 312 | 1st, West | 1983 | — | | BYE | W, 4–1, KAL | L, 2–4, TOL |
| 1983–84 | 82 | 46 | 27 | 6 | 3 | — | 101 | .616 | 403 | 335 | 2nd, IHL | 1984 | — | | BYE | L, 0–4, FLI | — |
| 1984–85 | 82 | 25 | 47 | 5 | 5 | — | 60 | .366 | 292 | 389 | 5th, West | 1985 | — | | Did not qualify | | |
| 1985–86 | 82 | 48 | 28 | 1 | 5 | — | 102 | .622 | 368 | 306 | 2nd, West | 1986 | — | | L, 1–4, PEO | — | — |
| 1986–87 | 82 | 41 | 37 | — | 2 | 2 | 86 | .524 | 342 | 358 | 3rd, West | 1987 | — | | L, 2–4, SLC | — | — |
| 1987–88 | 82 | 21 | 54 | 0 | 7 | — | 49 | .299 | 288 | 430 | 4th, West | 1988 | — | | Did not qualify | | |
| 1988–89 | 82 | 54 | 23 | 0 | 5 | — | 113 | .689 | 399 | 323 | 2nd, West | 1989 | — | | W, 4–2, KAL | L, 1–4, SLC | — |
| 1989–90 | 82 | 36 | 39 | 0 | 7 | — | 79 | .482 | 316 | 370 | 3rd, West | 1990 | — | | L, 2–4, SLC | — | — |
| 1990–91 | 82 | 36 | 43 | — | 3 | 0 | 75 | .457 | 275 | 316 | 4th, West | 1991 | — | | L, 2–4, PEO | — | — |
| 1991–92 | 82 | 38 | 36 | — | 5 | 3 | 84 | .512 | 306 | 309 | 3rd, East | 1992 | — | | L, 1–4, MUS | — | — |
| 1992–93 | 82 | 49 | 23 | — | 3 | 7 | 108 | .659 | 329 | 280 | 1st, Midwest | 1993 | — | | L, 2–4, KC | — | — |
| 1993–94 | 81 | 40 | 24 | — | 17 | 0 | 97 | .599 | 338 | 302 | 2nd, Midwest | 1994 | — | | L, 0–4, ATL | — | — |
| 1994–95 | 81 | 44 | 27 | 0 | 10 | — | 98 | .605 | 317 | 298 | 1st, Central | 1995 | — | W, 3–2, SD | L, 1–4, LV | — | — |
| 1995–96 | 82 | 40 | 32 | — | — | 10 | 90 | .549 | 290 | 307 | 1st, Midwest | 1996 | — | L, 1–3, PEO | — | — | — |
| 1996–97 | 82 | 38 | 36 | — | — | 8 | 84 | .512 | 253 | 298 | 4th, Midwest | 1997 | — | L, 0–3, LB | — | — | — |
| 1997–98 | 82 | 43 | 34 | — | — | 5 | 91 | .555 | 267 | 262 | 3rd, Midwest | 1998 | — | W, 3–1, HOU | L, 4–2, CHI | — | — |
| 1998–99 | 82 | 38 | 28 | — | — | 16 | 92 | .561 | 254 | 265 | 4th, Midwest | 1999 | — | L, 0–2, MTB | — | — | — |
| 1999–00 | 82 | 37 | 36 | — | — | 9 | 83 | .506 | 222 | 246 | 5th, Eastern | 2000 | — | L, 1–2, CLE | — | — | — |
| 2000–01 | 82 | 42 | 33 | — | — | 7 | 91 | .555 | 244 | 217 | 5th, Eastern | 2001 | — | | Did not qualify | | |
| 2001–02 | 80 | 30 | 35 | 10 | 5 | — | 75 | .469 | 198 | 207 | 5th, West | 2002 | Did not qualify | | | | |
| 2002–03 | 80 | 32 | 27 | 14 | 7 | — | 85 | .531 | 247 | 251 | 4th, West | 2003 | W, 2–1, RCH | L, 0–3, HOU | — | — | — |
| 2003–04 | 80 | 46 | 24 | 7 | 3 | — | 102 | .638 | 269 | 191 | 1st, West | 2004 | BYE | W, 4–3, CIN | W, 4–2, CHI | W, 4–1, RCH | W, 4–0, WBS |
| 2004–05 | 80 | 47 | 24 | — | 4 | 5 | 103 | .644 | 247 | 207 | 2nd, West | 2005 | — | L, 3–4, CIN | — | — | — |
| 2005–06 | 80 | 49 | 21 | — | 6 | 4 | 108 | .675 | 268 | 234 | 1st, West | 2006 | — | W, 4–3, IWA | W, 4–0, HOU | W, 4–0, GRG | L, 2–4, HER |
| 2006–07 | 80 | 41 | 25 | — | 4 | 10 | 96 | .600 | 227 | 230 | 3rd, West | 2007 | — | L, 0–4, CHI | — | — | — |
| 2007–08 | 80 | 44 | 29 | — | 4 | 3 | 95 | .594 | 231 | 212 | 4th, West | 2008 | — | L, 2–4, CHI | — | — | — |
| 2008–09 | 80 | 49 | 22 | — | 3 | 6 | 107 | .669 | 229 | 195 | 1st, West | 2009 | — | W, 4–0, RCK | L, 3–4, HOU | — | — |
| 2009–10 | 80 | 41 | 30 | — | 2 | 7 | 91 | .569 | 237 | 220 | 4th, West | 2010 | — | L, 3–4, CHI | — | — | — |
| 2010–11 | 80 | 44 | 22 | — | 6 | 8 | 102 | .638 | 226 | 194 | 1st, West | 2011 | — | W, 4–2, TEX | L, 3–4, HOU | — | — |
| 2011–12 | 76 | 40 | 29 | — | 2 | 5 | 87 | .572 | 210 | 190 | 2nd, Midwest | 2012 | — | L, 0–3, ABB | — | — | — |
| 2012–13 | 76 | 41 | 28 | — | 4 | 3 | 89 | .586 | 197 | 200 | 2nd, Midwest | 2013 | — | L, 1–3, TEX | — | — | — |
| 2013–14 | 76 | 39 | 24 | — | 6 | 7 | 91 | .599 | 215 | 199 | 3rd, Midwest | 2014 | — | L, 0–3, TOR | — | — | — |
| 2014–15 | 76 | 33 | 28 | — | 8 | 7 | 81 | .533 | 206 | 218 | 5th, Midwest | 2015 | — | Did not qualify | | | |
| 2015–16 | 76 | 48 | 23 | — | 3 | 2 | 101 | .664 | 224 | 193 | 1st, Central | 2016 | — | L, 0–3, GR | — | — | — |
| 2016–17 | 76 | 43 | 26 | — | 4 | 3 | 95 | .612 | 225 | 215 | 3rd, Central | 2017 | — | L, 0–3, GR | — | — | — |
| 2017–18 | 76 | 38 | 32 | — | 4 | 2 | 82 | .539 | 216 | 235 | 6th, Central | 2018 | — | Did not qualify | | | |
| 2018–19 | 76 | 36 | 24 | — | 14 | 2 | 88 | .579 | 217 | 207 | 2nd, Central | 2019 | — | L, 2–3, IA | — | — | — |
| 2019–20 | 61 | 41 | 14 | — | 5 | 3 | 90 | .714 | 211 | 141 | 1st, Central | 2020 | — | Season cancelled due to the COVID-19 pandemic | | | |
| 2020–21 | Did not participate due to the COVID-19 pandemic | | | | | | | | | | | | | | | | |
| 2021–22 | 76 | 39 | 28 | — | 5 | 4 | 87 | .572 | 229 | 228 | 3rd, Central | 2022 | BYE | W, 3–2, MB | L, 1–3, CHI | — | — |
| 2022–23 | 72 | 41 | 24 | — | 5 | 2 | 89 | .618 | 238 | 211 | 2nd, Central | 2023 | BYE | W, 3–2, MB | W, 3–2, TEX | L, 2–4, CV | — |
| 2023–24 | 72 | 47 | 22 | — | 2 | 1 | 97 | .674 | 238 | 193 | 1st, Central | 2024 | BYE | W, 3–2, TEX | W, 3–2, GR | L, 1–4, CV | — |
| 2024–25 | 72 | 40 | 21 | — | 5 | 6 | 91 | .632 | 218 | 184 | 1st, Central | 2025 | BYE | W, 3–2, RCK | L, 2–3, TEX | — | — |
| 2025–26 | 72 | 32 | 33 | — | 4 | 3 | 71 | .493 | 206 | 221 | 5th, Central | 2026 | L, 1–2, MB | — | — | — | — |

== Players ==
=== Current roster ===
Updated October 25, 2026.

| No. | Nat | Player | Pos | S/G | Age | Acquired | Birthplace | Contract |
|---|---|---|---|---|---|---|---|---|
| 47 | (United States) | Jack Ahcan | D | L | 29 | 2026 | Savage, Minnesota | Predators |
| 15 | (United States) | Chase Bradley | LW | L | 24 | 2026 | St. Louis, Missouri | Predators |
| 41 | (Sweden) | David Edstrom | C | L | 21 | 2025 | Göteborg, Sweden | Predators |
| 17 | (United States) | John Farinacci | C | R | 25 | 2026 | Red Bank, New Jersey | Admirals |
| 81 | (Canada) | Aiden Fink | RW | R | 21 | 2026 | Calgary, Alberta | Predators |
| 6 | (Canada) | Andrew Gibson | D | R | 21 | 2025 | La Salle, Ontario | Predators |
| 5 | (United States) | Kevin Gravel (C) | D | L | 34 | 2022 | Kingsford, Michigan | Admirals |
| 34 | (Sweden) | Viggo Gustafsson | D | L | 20 | 2026 | Väckelsång, Sweden | Predators |
| 7 | (Canada) | Tyson Jost | C | L | 28 | 2026 | St. Albert, Alberta | Predators |
| 24 | (United States) | Michael Karow (PTO) | D | L | 27 | 2026 | Green Bay, Wisconsin | Admirals |
| 25 | (Finland) | Joakim Kemell | RW | R | 22 | 2023 | Jyväskylä, Finland | Predators |
| 48 | (Canada) | Kalan Lind | LW | L | 21 | 2025 | Shaunavon, Saskatchewan | Predators |
| 19 | (Canada) | Jake Lucchini (A) | C | L | 31 | 2024 | Trail, British Columbia | Predators |
| 36 | (Canada) | Kyle Marino (A) | C | R | 31 | 2024 | Niagara Falls, Ontario | Admirals |
| 28 | (Canada) | Brady Martin | C | R | 19 | 2026 | Elmira, Ontario | Predators |
| 50 | (Canada) | Tanner Molendyk | D | L | 21 | 2025 | Kamloops, British Columbia | Predators |
| 32 | (Canada) | Matt Murray | G | L | 28 | 2024 | St. Albert, Alberta | Predators |
| 3 | (Finland) | Daniel Nieminen | D | L | 20 | 2026 | Lahti, Finland | Predators |
| 52 | (Sweden) | Felix Nilsson | C | L | 21 | 2026 | Stockholm, Sweden | Predators |
| 77 | (Canada) | Cole O'Hara | RW | R | 24 | 2025 | Richmond Hill, Ontario | Predators |
| 30 | (Sweden) | Isak Posch | G | L | 24 | 2026 | Umeå, Sweden | Predators |
| 55 | (United States) | Hunter Skinner | D | R | 25 | 2026 | Wyandotte, Michigan | Predators |
| 12 | (United States) | Ryan Ufko | D | R | 23 | 2024 | Plainview, New York | Predators |
| 88 | (Canada) | Oasiz Wiesblatt | C | L | 22 | 2025 | Calgary, Alberta | Admirals |
| 89 | (Canada) | Ozzy Wiesblatt | RW | R | 24 | 2024 | Calgary, Alberta | Predators |
| 13 | (United States) | Joey Willis | C | L | 21 | 2025 | Elmhurst, Illinois | Predators |

=== Team captains ===
- Neil Meadmore, 1987–88
- Peter Bakovic, 1988–1991
- Gino Cavallini, 1994–1996
- Tony Hrkac, 1996–97
- Jeff Nelson, 1997–1999
- Marc Moro, 1999–2001
- Andy Berenzweig, 2002–03
- Ray Schultz, 2003–04
- Tony Hrkac, 2004–05
- Greg Zanon, 2005–06
- Sheldon Brookbank, 2006–07
- Alex Henry, 2007–08
- Nolan Yonkman, 2008–2010
- Brett Palin, 2010–11
- Scott Ford, 2011–12, 2013–14
- Mike Moore, 2012–13
- Joe Piskula, 2014–15
- Colton Sissons, 2015–16
- Trevor Smith, 2016–2018
- Jarred Tinordi, 2018–2020
- Cole Schneider, 2021–2023
- Kevin Gravel, 2023–present

=== American Hockey League Hall of Famers ===
AHL Hall of Fame Honored Members
| Name | Seasons | Induction Year |
|---|---|---|
| Darren Haydar | 2002-06 (player) | 2020 |
| John Slaney | 1998-99 (player) | 2014 |
| Brad Smyth | 1998-99 (player) | 2019 |
| Wendell Young | 1983-84 (player) | 2026 |

=== Retired numbers ===
Milwaukee Admirals retired numbers
| No. | Player | Position | Career | No. retirement |
|---|---|---|---|---|
| 9 | Phil Wittliff | C | 1973–1977 | April 3, 1977 |
| 14 | Fred Berry | C | 1980–1984, 1985–1987 | December 27, 2003 |
| 14 | Mike McNeill | C | 1992–1998 | December 27, 2003 |
| 20 | Darren Haydar | RW | 2002–2006 | February 21, 2020 |
| 26 | Tony Hrkac | C | 1994–1997, 2003–2005 | March 14, 2008 |
| 27 | Danny Lecours | LW | 1975–1984, 1985–1986 | January 4, 1987 |
| 44 | Kevin Willison | D | 1981–1984, 1985–1986 | February 28, 2004 |
| 44 | Gino Cavallini | C | 1993–1996 | February 28, 2004 |

=== Notable NHL alumni ===
List of Milwaukee Admirals alumni who played more than 100 games in Milwaukee and 100 or more games in the National Hockey League.

- Pontus Aberg
- Shawn Antoski
- Victor Bartley
- Michel Bergeron
- Anthony Bitetto
- Jonathon Blum
- Gabriel Bourque
- Randy Boyd
- Sheldon Brookbank
- Alexandre Carrier
- Gino Cavallini
- Kevin Fiala
- Vernon Fiddler
- John Flesch
- Cody Franson
- Frederick Gaudreau
- Dan Hamhuis
- Alex Henry
- Tony Hrkac
- Andrew Hutchinson
- Kevin Klein
- Jeff Larmer
- Michael Latta
- David Mackey
- Bob Mason
- Chris Mason
- Andrew McBain
- Mark Mowers
- Rob Murphy
- Cal O'Reilly
- Mathieu Olivier
- Rich Peverley
- Pekka Rinne
- Miikka Salomaki
- Mike Santorelli
- Brandon Segal
- Colton Sissons
- Trevor Smith
- Wyatt Smith
- Nick Spaling
- Jeremy Stevenson
- Zack Stortini
- Alexander Sulzer
- Tom Tilley
- Jarred Tinordi
- Eeli Tolvanen
- Mike Tomlak
- Jordin Tootoo
- Yakov Trenin
- Steve Tuttle
- Scottie Upshall
- Austin Watson
- Greg Zanon
- Richard Zemlak

== Team records ==
=== Single season ===
- Goals: Danny Lecours, 75, (1982–83)
- Assists: Dale Yakiwchuk, 100, (1982–83)
- Points: Dale Yakiwchuk, 138, (1982–83)
- Penalty minutes: Don Gibson, 381, (1992–93)
- GAA: Connor Ingram, 1.92, (2019–20)
- SV%: Connor Ingram, .933, (2019–20)

=== Career ===
- Career goals: Danny Lecours, 445
- Career assists: Fred Berry, 379
- Career points: Danny Lecours, 814
- Career penalty minutes: Ken Sabourin, 1233
- Career goaltending wins: Rich Sirois, 119
- Career shutouts: Brian Finley, 11
- Career games: Danny Lecours, 641
