= 1975–76 QMJHL season =

Canadian junior ice hockey season

The 1975–76 QMJHL season was the seventh season in the history of the Quebec Major Junior Hockey League. The league inaugurates the Emile Bouchard Trophy to be awarded to the "Defenceman of the Year." Ten teams played 72 games each in the schedule.

The Sherbrooke Castors finished first overall in the regular season to capture the Jean Rougeau Trophy but were defeated by the Quebec Remparts in the playoff finals. It was the fifth President's Cup in seven years for Québec.

== Team changes ==
- The Montreal Bleu Blanc Rouge are renamed the Montreal Juniors.

== Final standings ==
Note: GP = Games played; W = Wins; L = Losses; T = Ties; PTS = Points; GF = Goals for; GA = Goals against

| East Division | GP | W | L | T | Pts | GF | GA |
|---|---|---|---|---|---|---|---|
| Quebec Remparts | 72 | 39 | 25 | 8 | 86 | 336 | 288 |
| Trois-Rivières Draveurs | 72 | 36 | 31 | 5 | 77 | 390 | 346 |
| Chicoutimi Saguenéens | 72 | 29 | 31 | 12 | 70 | 353 | 372 |
| Sorel Éperviers | 72 | 27 | 34 | 11 | 65 | 302 | 377 |
| Shawinigan Dynamos | 72 | 9 | 59 | 4 | 22 | 254 | 554 |

| West Division | GP | W | L | T | Pts | GF | GA |
|---|---|---|---|---|---|---|---|
| Sherbrooke Castors | 72 | 51 | 12 | 9 | 111 | 514 | 276 |
| Cornwall Royals | 72 | 39 | 24 | 9 | 87 | 349 | 270 |
| Montreal Juniors | 72 | 36 | 29 | 7 | 79 | 328 | 289 |
| Hull Festivals | 72 | 30 | 35 | 7 | 67 | 312 | 318 |
| Laval National | 72 | 25 | 41 | 6 | 56 | 310 | 358 |

- complete list of standings.

== Scoring leaders ==
Note: GP = Games played; G = Goals; A = Assists; Pts = Points; PIM = Penalties in minutes

| Player | Team | GP | G | A | Pts | PIM |
|---|---|---|---|---|---|---|
| Richard Dalpe | Trois-Rivières Draveurs | 73 | 67 | 93 | 160 | 30 |
| Sylvain Locas | Chicoutimi Saguenéens | 72 | 80 | 80 | 160 | 95 |
| Peter Marsh | Sherbrooke Castors | 70 | 75 | 81 | 156 | 103 |
| Mike Bossy | Laval National | 64 | 79 | 57 | 136 | 25 |
| Glen Sharpley | Hull Festivals | 69 | 60 | 74 | 134 | 99 |
| Fern LeBlanc | Sherbrooke Castors | 71 | 63 | 71 | 134 | 31 |
| Bobby Simpson | Sherbrooke Castors | 68 | 56 | 77 | 133 | 126 |
| Norm Dupont | Montreal Juniors | 70 | 69 | 63 | 132 | 8 |
| Pierre Brassard | Cornwall Royals | 72 | 68 | 62 | 130 | 93 |
| Richard David | Trois-Rivières Draveurs | 73 | 53 | 68 | 121 | 79 |

- complete scoring statistics

== Playoffs ==
Denis Turcotte was the leading scorer of the playoffs with 26 points (9 goals, 17 assists).

Quarterfinals

- Sherbrooke Castors defeated Hull Festivals 4 games to 2.
- Cornwall Royals defeated Montreal Juniors 4 games to 2.
- Quebec Remparts defeated Sorel Éperviers 4 games to 1.
- Trois-Rivières Draveurs defeated Chicoutimi Saguenéens 4 games to 1.

Semifinals

- Sherbrooke Castors defeated Trois-Rivières Draveurs 4 games to 1.
- Quebec Remparts defeated Cornwall Royals 4 games to 0.

Finals

- Quebec Remparts defeated Sherbrooke Castors 4 games to 2.

== All-star teams ==
East division 1st team

- Goaltender - Maurice Barrette, Quebec Remparts
- Left defence - Jean Gagnon, Quebec Remparts
- Right defence - Daniel Poulin, Chicoutimi Saguenéens
- Left winger - Richard David, Trois-Rivières Draveurs
- Centreman - Sylvain Locas, Chicoutimi Saguenéens
- Right winger - Lucien DeBlois, Sorel Éperviers
- Coach - Ron Racette, Quebec Remparts

West division 1st team

- Goaltender - Richard Sevigny, Sherbrooke Castors
- Left defence - Robert Picard, Montreal Juniors
- Right defence - Rick Garcia, Hull Festivals
- Left winger - Normand Dupont, Montreal Juniors
- Centreman - Glen Sharpley, Hull Festivals
- Right winger - Mike Bossy, Laval National & Peter Marsh, Sherbrooke Castors
- Coach - Orval Tessier, Cornwall Royals
- List of First/Second/Rookie team all-stars.

== Trophies and awards ==
Team

- President's Cup - Playoff Champions, Quebec Remparts
- Jean Rougeau Trophy - Regular Season Champions, Sherbrooke Castors

Player

- Michel Brière Memorial Trophy - Most Valuable Player, Peter Marsh, Sherbrooke Castors
- Jean Béliveau Trophy - Top Scorer, Sylvain Locas, Chicoutimi Saguenéens & Richard Dalpe, Trois-Rivières Draveurs
- Jacques Plante Memorial Trophy - Best GAA, Tim Bernhardt, Cornwall Royals
- Emile Bouchard Trophy - Defenceman of the Year, Jean Gagnon, Quebec Remparts
- Michel Bergeron Trophy - Rookie of the Year, Jean-Marc Bonamie, Shawinigan Dynamos
- Frank J. Selke Memorial Trophy - Most sportsmanlike player, Normand Dupont, Montreal Juniors

== See also ==
- 1976 Memorial Cup
- 1976 NHL entry draft
- 1975–76 OMJHL season
- 1975–76 WCHL season

| Preceded by 1974–75 QMJHL season | QMJHL seasons | Succeeded by 1976–77 QMJHL season |
