= 1974–75 QMJHL season =

Canadian junior ice hockey season

The 1974–75 QMJHL season was the sixth season in the history of the Quebec Major Junior Hockey League. Ten teams played 72 games each in the schedule. The Sherbrooke Castors finished first overall in the regular season to capture the Jean Rougeau Trophy, and won the President's Cup, defeating the Laval National in the finals.

== Team changes ==
- The Drummondville Rangers cease operations.

== Final standings ==
Note: GP = Games played; W = Wins; L = Losses; T = Ties; PTS = Points; GF = Goals For; GA = Goals Against

East Division	GP	W	L	T	Pts	GF	GA
Trois-Rivières Draveurs	72	34	25	13	81	322	294
Quebec Remparts	72	38	30	4	80	319	288
Chicoutimi Saguenéens	72	24	42	6	54	315	420
Sorel Éperviers	72	20	43	9	49	297	388
Shawinigan Dynamos	72	16	45	11	43	324	462

West Division	GP	W	L	T	Pts	GF	GA
Sherbrooke Castors	72	51	14	7	109	443	269
Montreal Bleu Blanc Rouge	72	40	25	7	87	462	338
Cornwall Royals	72	36	24	12	84	322	296
Hull Festivals	72	34	32	6	74	386	369
Laval National	72	26	39	7	59	335	401

- complete list of standings.

== Scoring leaders ==
Note: GP = Games played; G = Goals; A = Assists; Pts = Points; PIM = Penalties in Minutes

Player	Team	GP	G	A	Pts	PIM
Norm Dupont	Montreal Bleu Blanc Rouge	72	84	74	158	13
Jean-Luc Phaneuf	Montreal Bleu Blanc Rouge	71	51	100	151	13
Jim Montgomery	Hull Festivals	66	61	89	150	99
Mike Bossy	Laval National	67	84	65	149	42
Jean Trottier	Laval National	72	48	99	147	41
Claude Larose	Sherbrooke Castors	74	69	76	145	12
Jean Thibodeau	Shawinigan Dynamos	72	49	92	141	41
Danny Lecours	Chicoutimi Saguenéens	72	62	75	137	39
Daniel Beaulieu	Quebec Remparts	72	49	77	126	31
Michel Brisebois	Sherbrooke Castors	71	51	75	126	73
Pierre Mondou	Sorel / Montreal	68	56	70	126	36

- complete scoring statistics

== Playoffs ==
Mike Bossy was the leading scorer of the playoffs with 38 points (18 goals, 20 assists).

Quarterfinals

- Sherbrooke Castors defeated Hull Festivals 4 games to 0.
- Montreal Bleu Blanc Rouge defeated Cornwall Royals 4 games to 0.
- Laval National defeated Trois-Rivières Draveurs 4 games to 2.
- Chicoutimi Saguenéens defeated Quebec Remparts 4 games to 2.

Semifinals

- Laval National defeated Montreal Bleu Blanc Rouge 4 games to 1.
- Sherbrooke Castors defeated Chicoutimi Saguenéens 4 games to 0.

Finals

- Sherbrooke Castors defeated Laval National 4 games to 1.

== All-star teams ==
First team

- Goaltender - Mario Viens, Cornwall Royals
- Left defence - Richard Mulhern, Sherbrooke Castors
- Right defence - Francois Vachon, Trois-Rivières Draveurs
- Left winger - Normand Dupont, Montreal Bleu Blanc Rouge
- Centreman - Jean-Luc Phaneuf, Montreal Bleu Blanc Rouge
- Right winger - Mike Bossy, Laval National
- Coach - Orval Tessier, Cornwall Royals

Second team

- Goaltender - Normand Lapointe, Trois-Rivières Draveurs
- Left defence - Robert Picard, Montreal Bleu Blanc Rouge
- Right defence - Donald Lemieux, Quebec Remparts
- Left winger - Claude Larose, Sherbrooke Castors
- Centreman - Sidney Versey, Sherbrooke Castors
- Right winger - Pierre Mondou, Montreal Bleu Blanc Rouge
- Coach - Ghislain Delage, Sherbrooke Castors
- List of First/Second/Rookie team all-stars.

== Trophies and awards ==
Team

- President's Cup - Playoff Champions, Sherbrooke Castors
- Jean Rougeau Trophy - Regular Season Champions, Sherbrooke Castors

Player

- Michel Brière Memorial Trophy - Most Valuable Player, Mario Viens, Cornwall Royals
- Jean Béliveau Trophy - Top Scorer, Normand Dupont, Montreal Bleu Blanc Rouge
- Jacques Plante Memorial Trophy - Best GAA, Nick Sanza, Sherbrooke Castors
- Michel Bergeron Trophy - Rookie of the Year, Denis Pomerleau, Hull Festivals
- Frank J. Selke Memorial Trophy - Most sportsmanlike player, Jean-Luc Phaneuf, Montreal Bleu Blanc Rouge

== See also ==
- 1975 Memorial Cup
- 1975 NHL entry draft
- 1974–75 OMJHL season
- 1974–75 WCHL season

Preceded by 1973–74 QMJHL season	QMJHL seasons	Succeeded by 1975–76 QMJHL season
