= 1981–82 AHL season =

- League: American Hockey League
- Sport: Ice hockey

Regular season
- F. G. "Teddy" Oke Trophy: New Brunswick Hawks
- Season MVP: Mike Kaszycki
- Top scorer: Mike Kaszycki

Playoffs
- Champions: New Brunswick Hawks
- Runners-up: Binghamton Whalers

AHL seasons
- 1980–81 1982–83

The 1981–82 AHL season was the 46th season of the American Hockey League. Eleven teams played 80 games each in the schedule. The New Brunswick Hawks finished first overall in the regular season, and won their first Calder Cup championship.

== Team changes ==
- The Fredericton Express join the AHL as an expansion team, based in Fredericton, New Brunswick, playing in the North Division.
- The Erie Blades, based in Erie, Pennsylvania, transfer to the AHL as an expansion team, from the defunct Eastern Hockey League, and play in the South Division.

== Final standings ==
Note: GP = Games played; W = Wins; L = Losses; T = Ties; GF = Goals for; GA = Goals against; Pts = Points;

North	GP	W	L	T	Pts	GF	GA
New Brunswick Hawks (CHI/TOR)	80	48	21	11	107	338	227
Maine Mariners (PHI)	80	47	26	7	101	325	272
Nova Scotia Voyageurs (MTL)	80	35	35	10	80	330	313
Springfield Indians (NYR)	80	32	43	5	69	278	319
Fredericton Express (QUE)	80	20	55	5	45	275	408

South	GP	W	L	T	Pts	GF	GA
Binghamton Whalers (HFD)	80	46	28	6	98	329	266
Rochester Americans (BUF)	80	40	31	9	89	325	286
New Haven Nighthawks (LAK)	80	39	33	8	86	292	276
Hershey Bears (WSH)	80	36	38	6	78	316	347
Adirondack Red Wings (DET)	80	34	37	9	77	299	285
Erie Blades (BOS/PIT)	80	22	52	6	50	317	425

== Scoring leaders ==
Note: GP = Games played; G = Goals; A = Assists; Pts = Points; PIM = Penalty minutes

Player	Team	GP	G	A	Pts	PIM
Mike Kaszycki	New Brunswick Hawks	80	36	82	118	67
Gordie Clark	Maine Mariners	80	50	51	101	34
Wayne Schaab	Maine Mariners	80	27	69	96	22
Guy Carbonneau	Nova Scotia Voyageurs	77	27	67	94	124
Wes Jarvis	Hershey Bears	56	31	61	92	44
Bob Sullivan	Binghamton Whalers	74	47	43	90	44
Paul Evans	Maine Mariners	79	33	57	90	42
Richard David	Fredericton Express	74	51	32	83	18
Mike Krushelnyski	Erie Blades	62	31	52	83	44
Steve Larmer	New Brunswick Hawks	74	38	44	82	46

- complete list

== Calder Cup playoffs ==
Division Semifinals
N1	New Brunswick	3
S5	Adirondack	2
North Division
N2	Maine	1
N3	Nova Scotia	3
S1	Binghamton	3
S4	Hershey	2
South Division
S2	Rochester	3
S3	New Haven	1

Division Finals
N1	New Brunswick	4
N3	Nova Scotia	1
S1	Binghamton	4
S2	Rochester	1

Calder Cup Final
N1	New Brunswick	4
S1	Binghamton	1

== Trophy and award winners ==
Team awards

Calder Cup; Playoff champions:	New Brunswick Hawks
F. G. "Teddy" Oke Trophy; Regular Season champions, North Division:	New Brunswick Hawks
John D. Chick Trophy; Regular Season champions, South Division:	Binghamton Whalers

Individual awards

Les Cunningham Award; Most valuable player:	Mike Kaszycki - New Brunswick Hawks
John B. Sollenberger Trophy; Top point scorer:	Mike Kaszycki - New Brunswick Hawks
Dudley "Red" Garrett Memorial Award; Rookie of the year:	Bob Sullivan - Binghamton Whalers
Eddie Shore Award; Defenceman of the year:	Dave Farrish - New Brunswick Hawks
Harry "Hap" Holmes Memorial Award; Lowest goals against average:	Bob Janecyk & Warren Skorodenski - New Brunswick Hawks
Louis A.R. Pieri Memorial Award; Coach of the year:	Larry Kish - Binghamton Whalers
Fred T. Hunt Memorial Award; Sportsmanship / Perseverance:	Mike Kaszycki - New Brunswick Hawks

Other awards

James C. Hendy Memorial Award; Most outstanding executive:	Roy Mlakar
James H. Ellery Memorial Awards; Outstanding media coverage:	Barry Meisel, Binghamton, (newspaper); Dave Morrell, Fredericton, (radio); John Logan, Moncton, (television)
Ken McKenzie Award; Outstanding marketing executive:	Rick Peckham, Rochester Americans

== See also ==
- List of AHL seasons

Preceded by 1980–81 AHL season	AHL seasons	Succeeded by 1982–83 AHL season
