= Montreal Juniors =

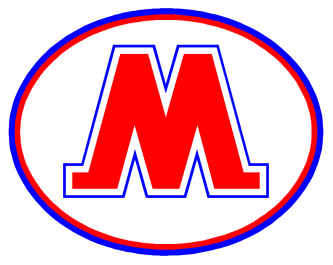
- City: Montreal, Quebec
- League: Q.M.J.H.L.
- Operated: 1975–1982
- Home arena: Montreal Forum
- Colours: Red, White and Blue

Franchise history
- 1933–1972: Montreal Junior Canadiens
- 1972–1975: Montreal Bleu Blanc Rouge
- 1975–1982: Montreal Juniors
- 1982–1984: Verdun Juniors
- 1984–1989: Verdun Junior Canadiens
- 1989–1996: Saint-Hyacinthe Laser
- 1996–present: Rouyn-Noranda Huskies

The Montreal Juniors were a junior ice hockey team in the Quebec Major Junior Hockey League from 1975 to 1982. They played at the Montreal Forum in Montreal, Quebec, Canada.

== History ==
The Montreal Bleu Blanc Rouge were renamed in 1975, becoming the Montreal Juniors. The most famous graduate from the team is Denis Savard. The team played for seven seasons as the Montreal Juniors before moving to Verdun.

== Players ==
=== Award winners ===
Robert Lebel Trophy
(Team with the best Goals Against Average)

- Montreal Juniors 1981–82

Michel Brière Commemorative Trophy
(Most valuable player)

- 1977–78 Kevin Reeves
- 1979–80 Denis Savard

Jacques Plante Commemorative Trophy
(Best Goals Against Average)

- 1981–82 Jeff Barratt

Emile Bouchard Trophy
(Defenseman of the year)

- 1976–77 Robert Picard
- 1977–78 Mark Hardy

Instructor's Trophy
(Offensive Rookie of the Year)

- 1977–78 Denis Savard (co-winner)

Raymond Lagacé Trophy
(Offensive Rookie of the Year)

- 1980–81 Billy Campbell

Frank J. Selke Commemorative Trophy
(Most sportsmanlike player)

- 1975–76 Normand Dupont
- 1977–78 Kevin Reeves

Marcel Robert Trophy
(Scholastic player of the year)

- 1980–81 François Lecomte

=== Hall of Fame alumni ===
Two members of the Montreal Juniors would be enshrined in the HHOF. One of them played for the Juniors, the other was one of the team's coaches.

Denis Savard was a local superstar and centreman, who played three seasons with the Juniors racking up 455 points in three years. He would go on to play many years for the Chicago Blackhawks, and won a Stanley Cup with the Montreal Canadiens in 1993.

Jacques Laperrière was a defenseman, part of many Montreal Canadiens championship teams. After retiring as a player, Laperrière took on the position of coach of the Montreal Juniors prior to the 1975–76 season. Partway through the following year he resigned, as the pressure and violence at the amateur level caused him to sour on his new profession.

=== NHL alumni ===
- Marco Baron
- Normand Baron
- Denis Cyr
- Pat Daley
- Norm Dupont
- Mark Hardy
- Rob Holland
- Mike Krushelnyski
- Alain Lemieux
- Garth MacGuigan
- Mike McDougall
- Sean McKenna
- Gates Orlando
- Robert Picard
- Denis Savard

== Yearly results ==
=== Regular season ===
Season	Games	Won	Lost	Tied	Points	Pct %	Goals for	Goals against	Standing
1975–76	72	36	29	7	79	0.549	328	289	3rd West
1976–77	72	27	37	8	62	0.431	310	368	4th Lebel
1977–78	72	41	25	6	88	0.611	397	327	2nd Lebel
1978–79	72	39	25	8	86	0.597	384	291	2nd Lebel
1979–80	72	39	30	3	81	0.562	406	387	2nd Lebel
1980–81	72	35	37	0	70	0.486	316	328	3rd Lebel
1981–82	64	40	22	2	82	0.641	311	247	3rd QMJHL

=== Playoffs ===
- 1975–1976 Lost to Cornwall Royals 4 games to 2 in quarter-finals.
- 1976–1977 Defeated Chicoutimi Saguenéens 9 points to 7 in quarter-finals.
  Lost to Quebec Remparts 9 points to 1 in semi-finals.
- 1977–1978 Defeated Verdun Eperviers 8 points to 0 in quarter-finals.
  Defeated Cornwall Royals 8 points to 2 in semi-finals.
  Lost to Trois-Rivières Draveurs 8 points to 0 in finals.
- 1978–1979 Defeated Quebec Remparts 8 points to 4 in quarter-finals.
  Lost to Trois-Rivières Draveurs 8 points to 2 in semi-finals.
- 1979–1980 Defeated Quebec Remparts 4 games to 1 in quarter-finals.
  Lost to Sherbrook Castors 4 games to 1 in semi-finals.
- 1980–1981 Lost to Trois-Rivières 4 games to 3 in quarter-finals.
- 1981–1982 Eliminated by finishing 7th place in an 8 team round-robin. (5 wins, 9 losses)
