= List of Pittsburgh Penguins draft picks =

The Pittsburgh Penguins are a team in the National Hockey League (NHL).

== History ==
Joe Daley became the first of 20 players selected by the Penguins in the 1967 NHL Expansion Draft on June 6, 1967. The next day, the Penguins participated in their first amateur draft, where they selected Steve Rexe second overall.

The Penguins obtained the first-overall pick in 1984, and selected Mario Lemieux from the Laval Voisins of the Quebec Major Junior Hockey League (QMJHL). Lemieux won the Calder Memorial Trophy as the NHL's best rookie in 1985. He went on to win six Art Ross trophies as the NHL's leading scorer, captained the team to Stanley Cup championships in 1991 and 1992, and was inducted into the Hockey Hall of Fame in 1997 following his first retirement. He later came back to play in another five seasons for the Penguins, and in 1999, became chairman and co-owner of the team. As owner, Lemieux negotiated an agreement to construct a new arena, the Consol Energy Center, ensuring the team's future in Pittsburgh. After the Penguins' 2009 Stanley Cup victory, Lemieux became the first person to win a Stanley Cup as both a player and an owner.

In 1990, the Penguins drafted Czechoslovak Jaromír Jágr with the fifth overall pick. Following the Velvet Revolution of 1989, Jagr was the first Czechoslovak to attend the NHL Draft with the government's permission, becoming the first drafted without having to defect to the West. Jagr was also the first European drafted in the first round by the Penguins after selecting only Canadians in their first 23 years. He was the first of four consecutive first round Europeans, and eight in ten years from 1990 to 1999. That draft was also notable in being the first time that less than half of Pittsburgh's picks were used on players born in Canada and the first time that a majority of their selections did not hail from Canada (6 players came from the United States, 4 from Canada).

Artem Kopot, an up-and-coming Russian defenseman with the Soviet under-18 team who had also played 28 games with his hometown Traktor Chelyabinsk in 1991–92, was the first Russian player to be drafted by the Penguins, selected in the sixth round, 139th overall, of the 1992 NHL entry draft. Less than a month after being selected by the Penguins and five days before his 20th birthday, Kopot was involved in a fatal one-car accident in his hometown of Chelyabinsk. Kopot was the only person in the vehicle.

Brooks Orpik was the first American drafted by the Penguins in the first round when he was selected in 2000 from Boston College. Along with Ryan Whitney in 2002 and Beau Bennett in 2010, the Penguins have only selected three Americans in the first round as of 2021.

The Penguins traded for the first overall pick for 2003, which they used to select goaltender Marc-Andre Fleury. Fleury was the third goaltender selected first overall behind Michel Plasse and Rick DiPietro. Pittsburgh's first-round selection, second overall, in 2004, Evgeni Malkin, was the Penguins' second Calder Trophy winner. The Penguins earned another first overall selection in 2005 and selected Sidney Crosby in what was nicknamed the "Sidney Crosby Sweepstakes."

== 1967 NHL Expansion Draft selections ==
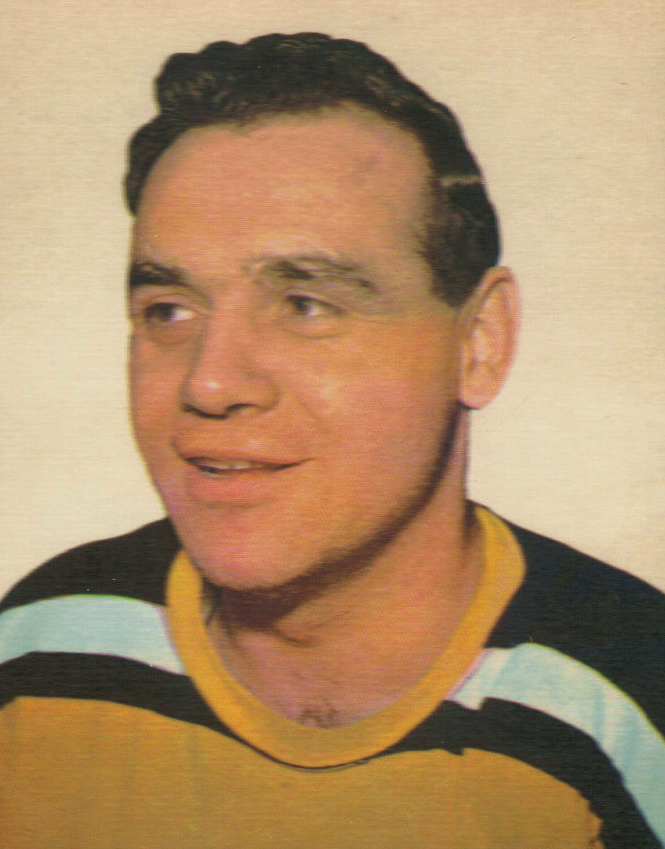
Leo Boivin was already an 18-year NHL veteran when he was selected by Pittsburgh.

Pittsburgh's first players were selected from the Original Six Teams

Round	Pick	Player	Pos	Nationality	Previous team	GP	G	A	Pts	PIM	W	L	T/OT	SV%	GAA	Ref(s)
1	5	Joe Daley	Goaltender	Canada	Detroit Red Wings	106	0	1	1	16	34	44	19	.898	3.35	¿
2	10	Roy Edwards	Goaltender	Canada	Chicago Black Hawks	236	0	2	2	6	97	88	38	.894	2.92	
3	17	Earl Ingarfield	Center	Canada	Detroit Red Wings	746	179	226	405	239						
4	22	Al MacNeil	Defenseman	Canada	New York Rangers	524	17	75	92	617						
5	28	Larry Jeffrey *	Left wing	Canada	Toronto Maple Leafs	368	39	62	101	293						
6	34	Ab McDonald ****	Left wing	Canada	Detroit Red Wings	762	182	248	439	200						¿
7	40	Leo Boivin	Defenseman	Canada	Detroit Red Wings	1150	72	250	322	1192						¿
8	46	Noel Price *	Defenseman	Canada	Montreal Canadiens	499	14	114	128	333						
9	52	Keith McCreary	Left wing	Canada	Montreal Canadiens	532	131	112	243	294						
10	58	Ken Schinkel	Right wing	Canada	New York Rangers	636	127	198	325	163						
11	64	Bob Dillabough	Center	Canada	Boston Bruins	283	32	54	86	76						¿
12	70	Art Stratton	Center	Canada	Chicago Black Hawks	95	18	33	51	24						
13	76	Val Fonteyne	Left wing	Canada	Detroit Red Wings	820	75	154	229	26						¿
14	82	Jeannot Gilbert	Center	Canada	Boston Bruins	9	0	1	1	4						¿
15	88	Tom McCarthy	Left wing	Canada	Montreal Canadiens	60	8	9	17	8						
16	94	Billy Dea	Center	Canada	Chicago Black Hawks	397	67	54	121	44						
17	100	Bobby Rivard	Center	Canada	Montreal Canadiens	27	5	12	17	4						
18	106	Mel Pearson	Center	Canada	Chicago Black Hawks	38	2	6	8	25						¿
19	112	Andy Bathgate *	Center	Canada	Detroit Red Wings	1069	349	624	973	624						¿
20	118	Les Hunt	Defenseman	Canada	New York Rangers	—	—	—	—	—						

== NHL draft selections ==
Key
Member of the Hockey Hall of Fame
Stanley Cup Champion (* number)
NHL All-Star
Played entire NHL career with Pittsburgh

Statistical abbreviations
GP	Games played	W	Wins
G	Goals	L	Losses
A	Assists	T/OT	Ties/overtime or shootout losses
Pts	Points	SV%	Save percentage
PIM	Penalties in minutes	GAA	Goals against average

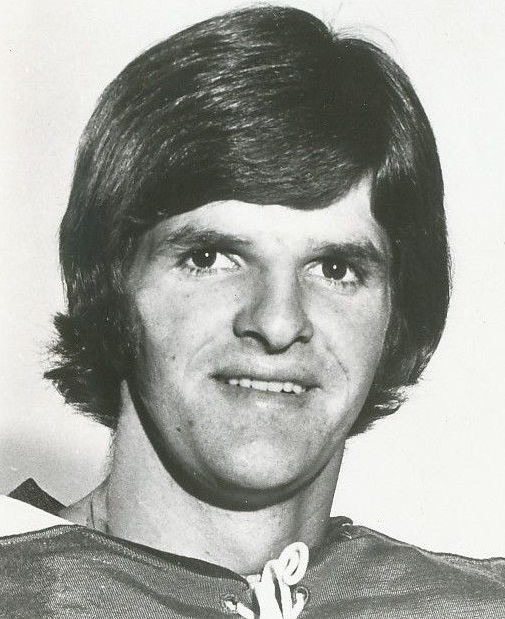
Denis Herron was the first goaltender drafted by Pittsburgh to become a full-time NHL player.

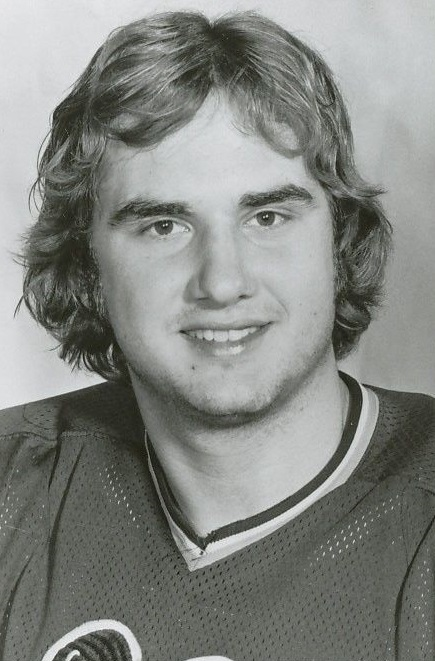
Blair Chapman was Pittsburgh's highest selection since their inaugural year. While he did play in the NHL, he never lived up to his draft position.

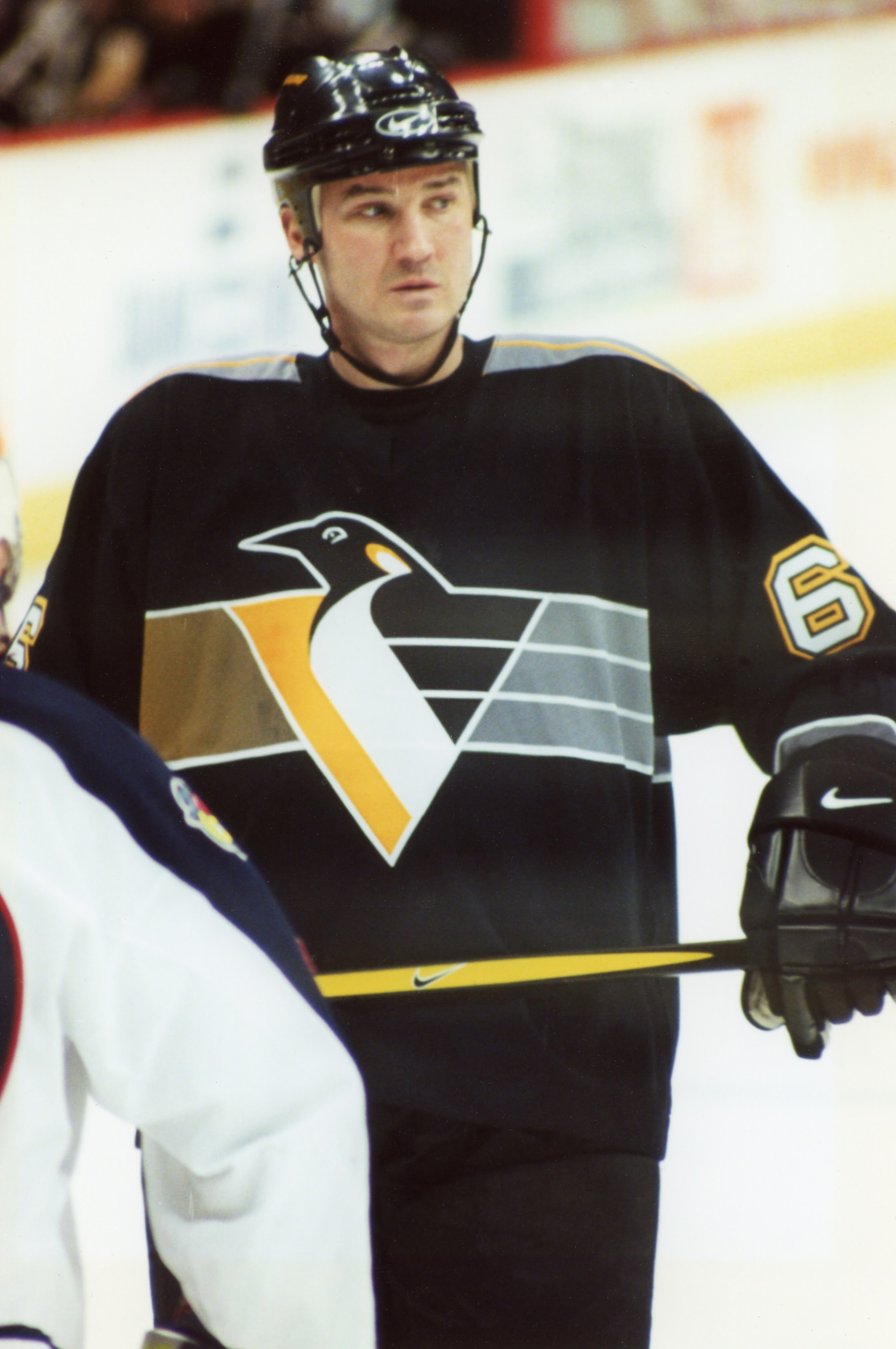
Mario Lemieux was Pittsburgh's first selection in 1984 and has been called the 'best player ever drafted'.

For once, we control our own destiny. The impact that Lemieux is going to have on our franchise is something we need. It won't just be the Pittsburgh Penguins; it will be Mario Lemieux and the Pittsburgh Penguins.

— ED JOHNSTON, General Manager of the Penguins in 1984.

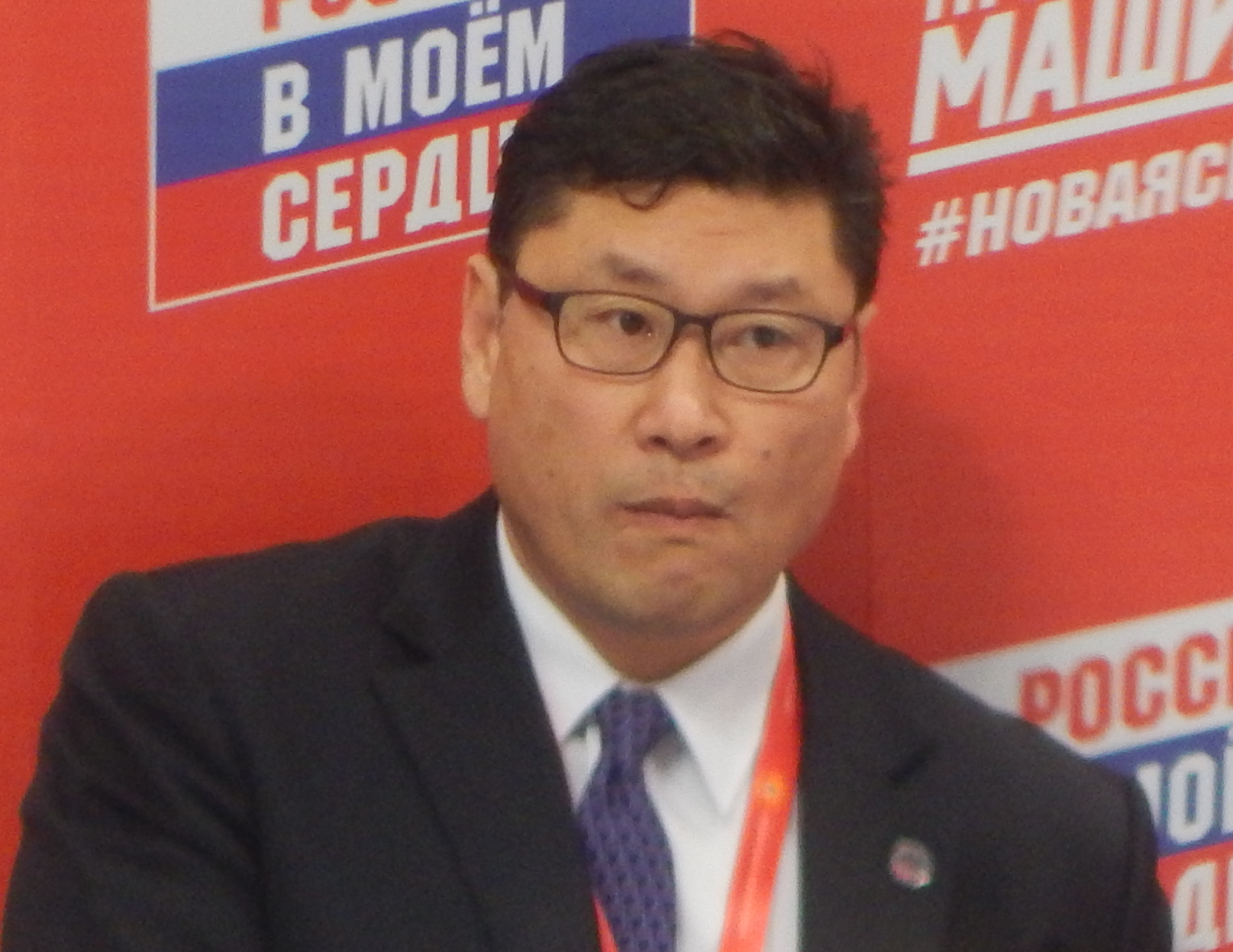
Jim Paek is the first played drafted by Pittsburgh to have been born in Asia. He moved to Canada when he was 1 year old.

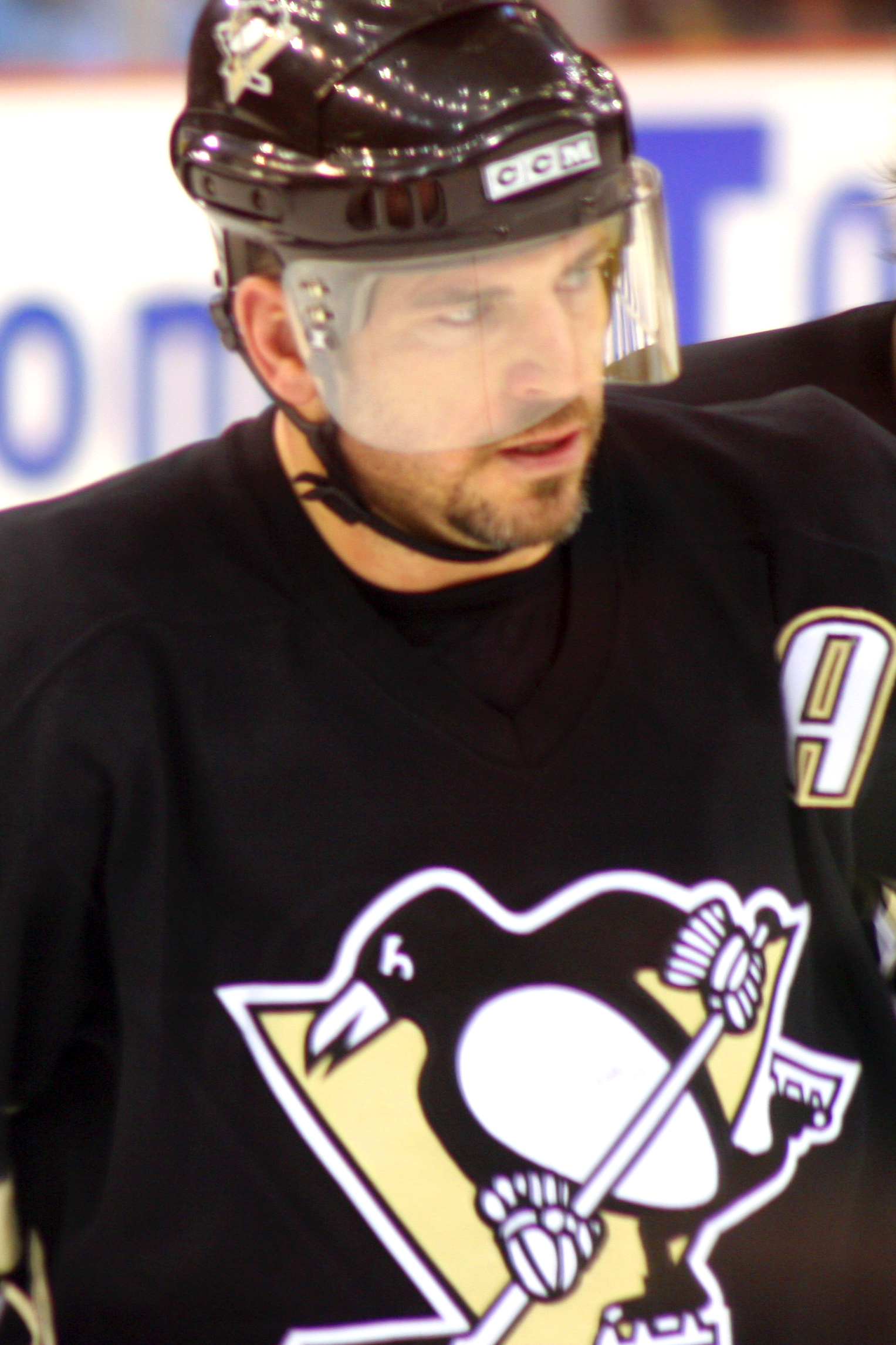
Mark Recchi is likely the best player drafted by Pittsburgh outside of the first round, being elected to the Hockey Hall of Fame in 2017.

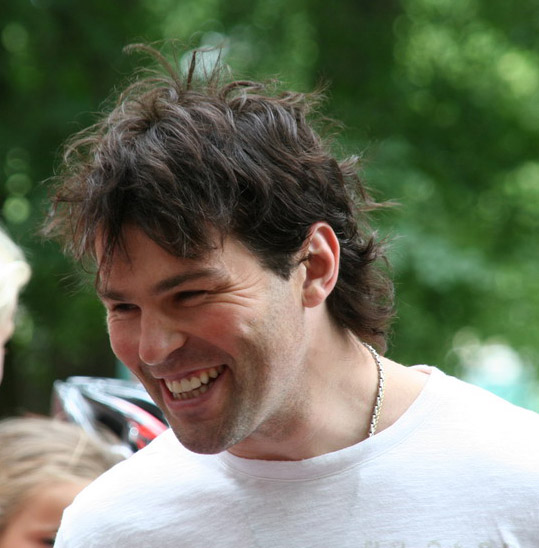
Jaromir Jagr became the Penguins first non-Canadian first-round pick in 1990.

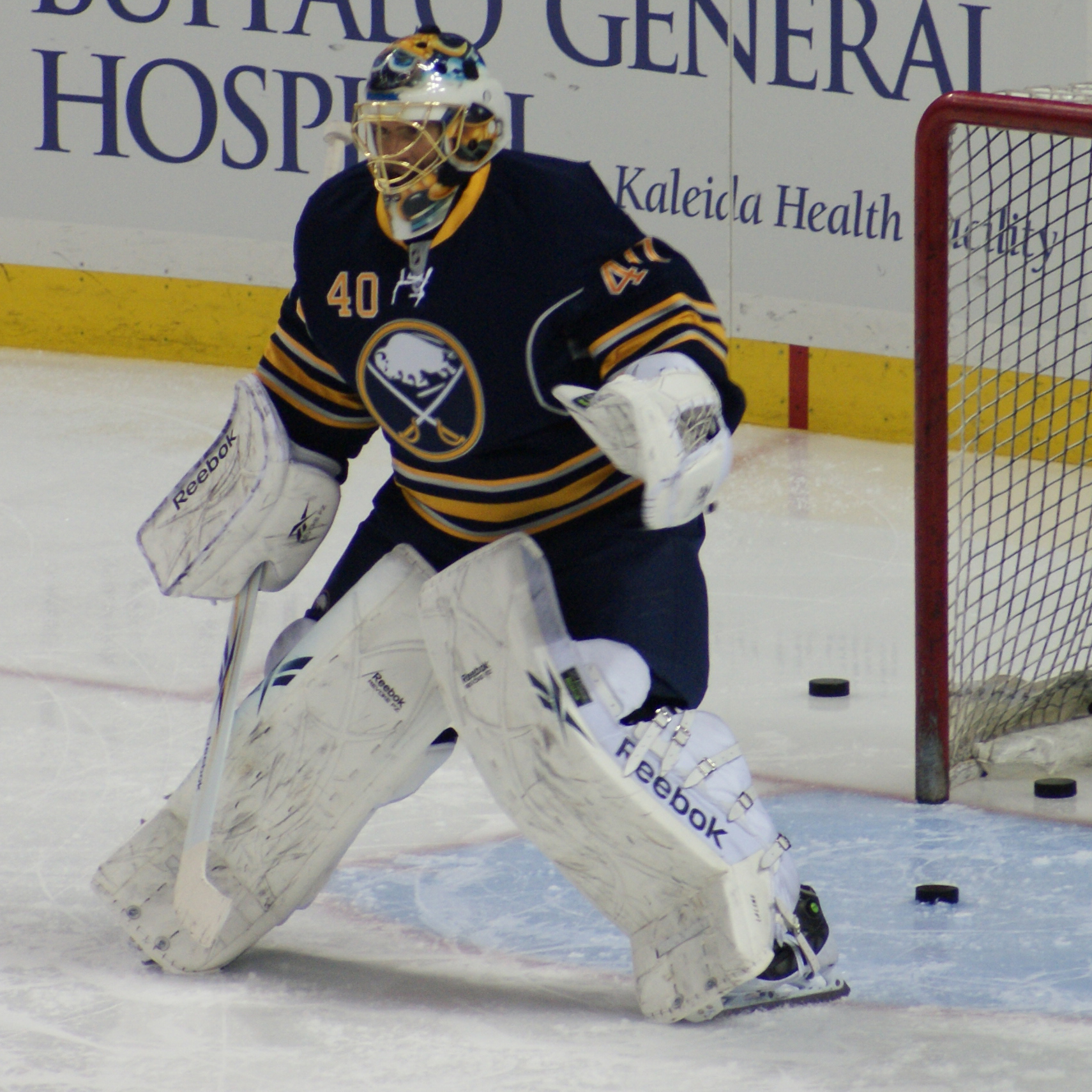
Patrick Lalime found success as a rookie for the Penguins, however, a contract dispute led to him being demoted and later traded.

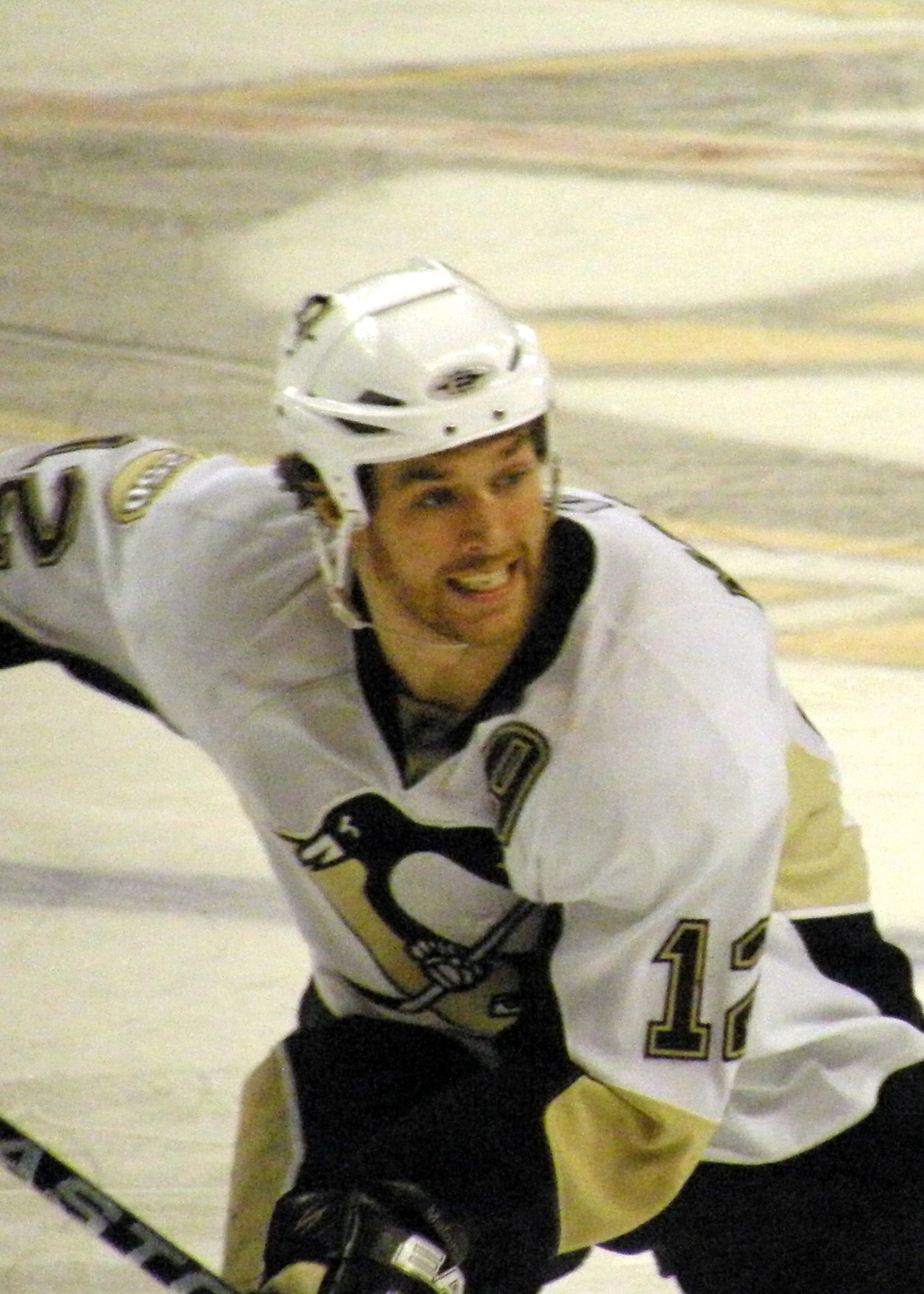
Ryan Malone was the first person born and raised in Pittsburgh to play for the Penguins. He's the son of former Penguin player and draft pick Greg Malone.

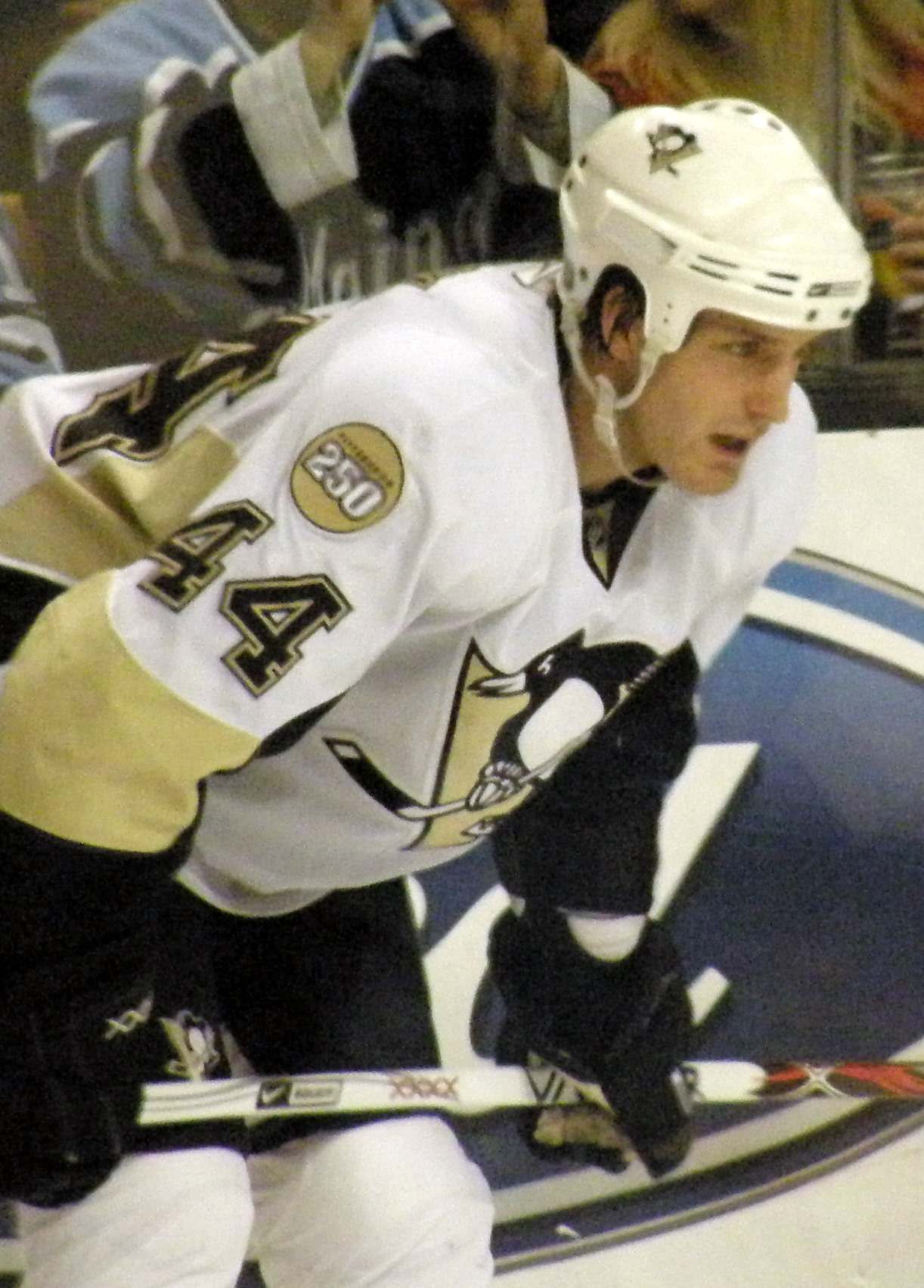
In 2000, Brooks Orpik became the first American drafted in the first-round by the Penguins.

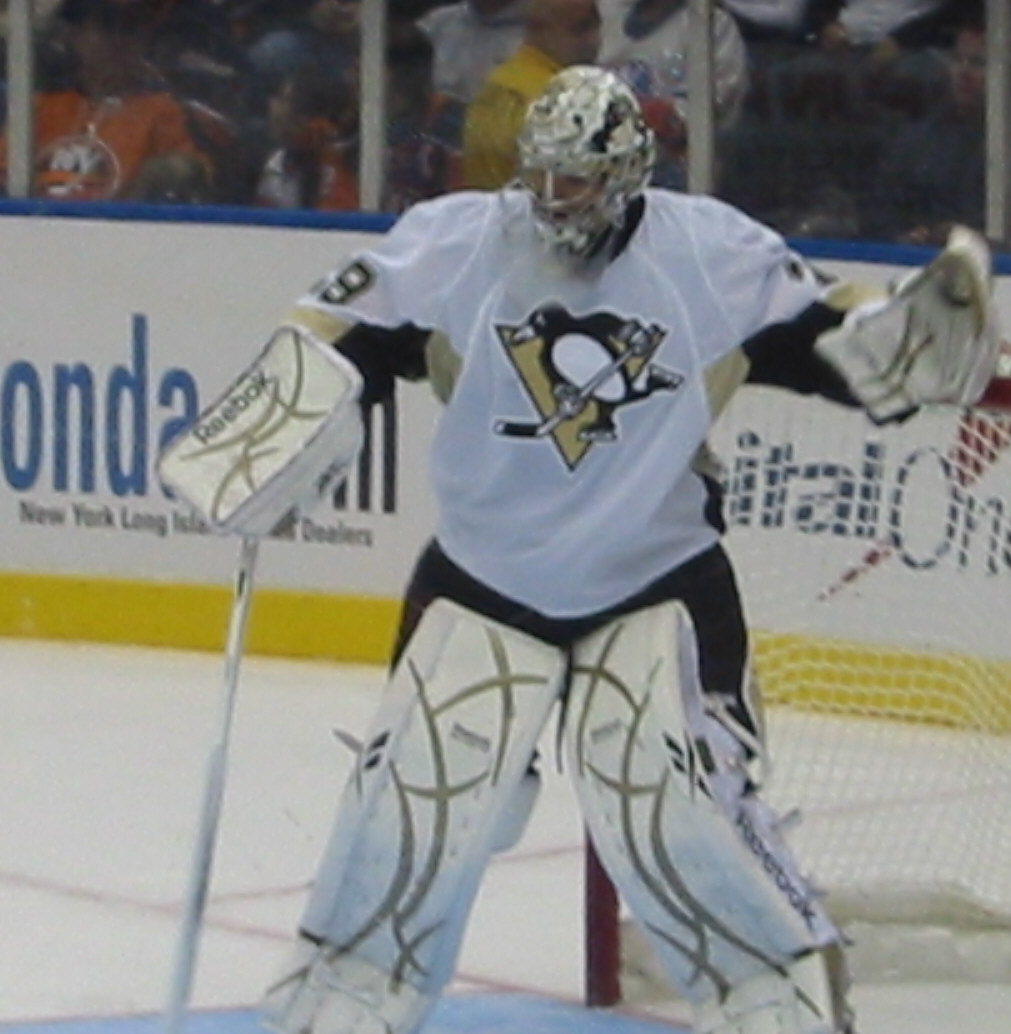
Marc-Andre Fleury was the first-overall pick in 2003.

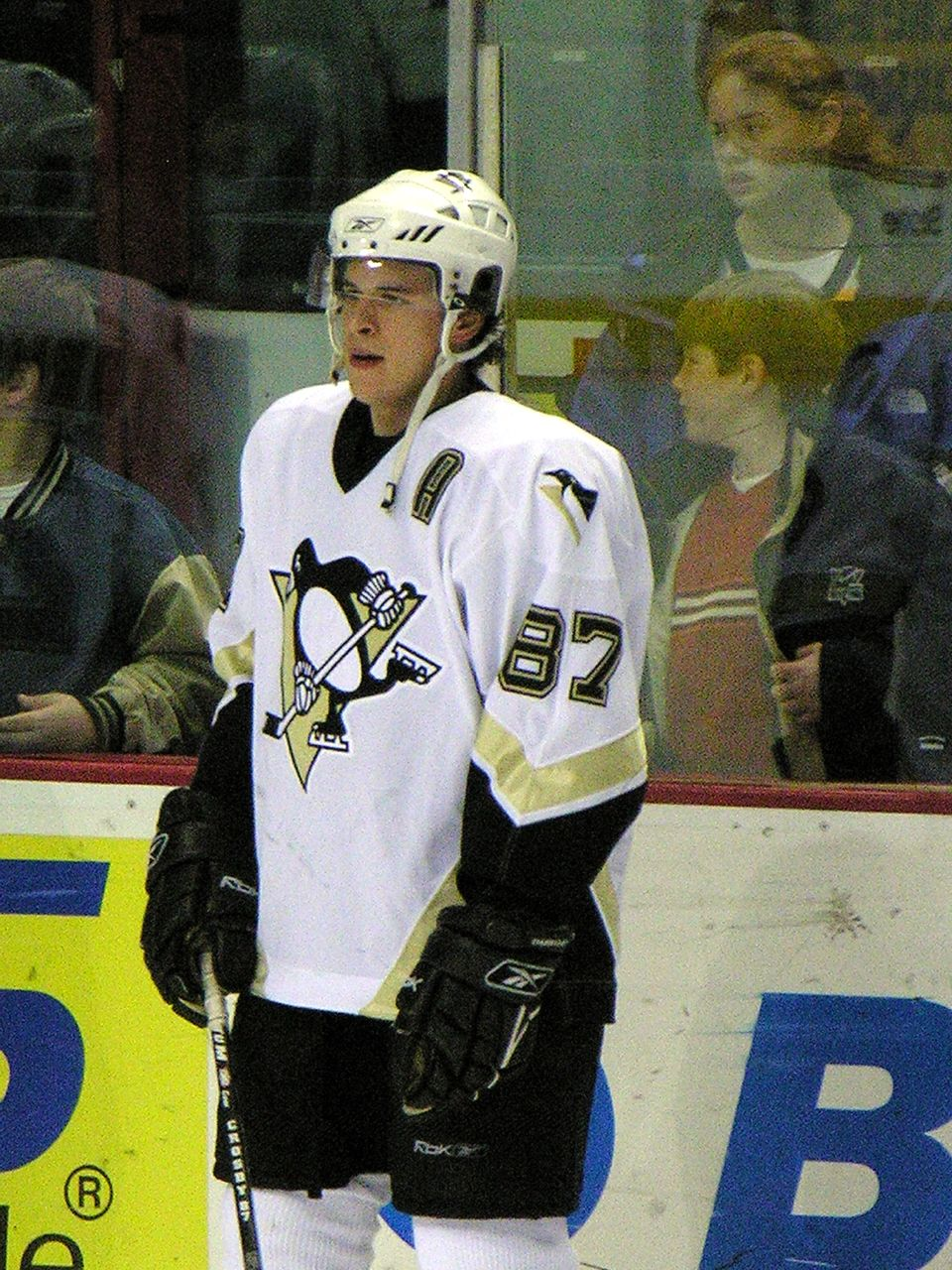
The Penguins selected Sidney Crosby first-overall in 2005.

This is huge for the franchise to be able to get a player of his caliber.

— MARIO LEMIEUX, Player and owner of the Penguins after the Penguins won the draft lottery to select Sidney Crosby in 2005

Note: Statistics listed include totals from all teams in the National Hockey League.
Note: Stats current to the conclusion of the 2025–26 season.

Draft	Round	Pick	Player	Pos	Nationality	Previous team	League	GP	G	A	Pts	PIM	W	L	T/OT	SV%	GAA	Ref(s)
1967	1	2	Steve Rexe	Goaltender	Canada	Belleville Mohawks	OHA Sr.	—					—	—	—	—	—	
1967	1	11	Bob Smith	Center	Canada	Sault Ste. Marie Greyhounds	NOJHL	—	—	—	—	—						
1968	1	4	Garry Swain	Center	Canada	Niagara Falls Flyers	OHA	9	1	1	2	0						¿
1968	2	14	Ron Snell	Right wing	Canada	Regina Pats	WCJHL	7	3	2	5	6						¿
1968	3	21	Dave Simpson	Defence	Canada	Port Arthur Juniors	TBJHL	—	—	—	—	—						
1969	2	15	Rick Kessell	Center	Canada	Oshawa Generals	OHA	135	4	24	28	8						
1969	3	26	Michel Briere	Center	Canada	Shawinigan Bruins	QJAHL	76	12	32	44	20						(Note: Briere died from injures sustained in a car crash shortly after the conclusion of the 1971 season)
1969	4	38	Yvon Labre	Defence	Canada	Toronto Marlboros	OHA	371	14	87	101	788						
1969	5	50	Ed Patenaude	Right wing	Canada	Calgary Centennials	WCHL	—	—	—	—	—						¿
1969	6	62	Paul Hoganson	Goaltender	Canada	Toronto Marlboros	OHA	2	0	0	0	0	0	1	0	.741	7.37	¿
1970	1	7	Greg Polis	Left wing	Canada	Estevan Bruins	WCHL	615	174	169	343	391						
1970	2	21	John Stewart	Left wing	Canada	Flin Flon Bombers	WCHL	258	58	60	118	158						¿
1970	3	35	Larry Bignell	Defence	Canada	Edmonton Oil Kings	WCHL	20	5	5	10	43						¿
1970	4	49	Connie Forey	Left wing	Canada	Ottawa 67's	OHA	4	0	0	0	2						¿
1970	5	63	Steve Cardwell	Left wing	Canada	Oshawa Generals	OHA	53	9	11	20	35						¿
1970	6	77	Bob Fitchner	Center	Canada	Brandon Wheat Kings	WCHL	78	12	20	32	59						¿
1970	7	90	Jim Pearson	Defence	Canada	Niagara Falls Flyers	OHA	—	—	—	—	—						
1970	8	102	Cam Newton	Goaltender	Canada	Kitchener Rangers	OHA	16	0	1	1	6	4	7	1	.863	3.76	¿
1970	9	110	Ron Lemieux	Defence	Canada	Dauphin Kings	MJHL	—	—	—	—	—						
1971	2	18	Brian McKenzie	Center	Canada	St. Catharines Black Hawks	OHA	6	1	1	2	4						¿
1971	2	18	Joe Noris	Center	Canada	Toronto Marlboros	OHA	55	2	5	7	22						¿
1971	4	46	Gerry Methe	Defence	Canada	Oshawa Generals	OHA	—	—	—	—	—						¿
1971	5	60	Dave Murphy	Goaltender	Canada	North Dakota Fighting Sioux	WCHA	—					—	—	—	—	—	
1971	6	74	Ian Williams	Wing	Canada	Notre Dame Fighting Irish	WCHA	—	—	—	—	—						
1971	7	88	Doug Elliott	Defence	Canada	Harvard Crimson	ECAC	—	—	—	—	—						
1972	2	24	Jack Lynch	Defence	Canada	Oshawa Generals	OHA	382	24	106	130	336						
1972	2	30	Bernie Lukowich	Right wing	Canada	New Westminster Bruins	WCHL	79	13	15	28	34						¿
1972	3	40	Denis Herron	Goaltender	Canada	Trois-Rivieres Ducs	QMJHL	462	0	9	9	89	146	203	76	.884	3.70	
1972	4	56	Ron Lalonde	Forward	Canada	Peterborough Petes	OHA	397	45	78	123	106						
1972	5	72	Brian Walker	Center	Canada	Peterborough Petes	OHA	—	—	—	—	—						
1972	6	88	Jeff Ablett	Left wing	Canada	Medicine Hat Tigers	WCHL	—	—	—	—	—						
1972	7	104	D'Arcy Keating	Right wing	Canada	Notre Dame Fighting Irish	WCHA	—	—	—	—	—						
1972	8	120	Yves Bergeron	Right wing	Canada	Shawinigan Bruins	QMJHL	3	0	0	0	0						¿
1972	9	136	Jay Babcock	Left wing	Canada	London Knights	OHA	—	—	—	—	—						
1972	10	149	Don Atchison	Goaltender	Canada	Saskatoon Blades	WCHL	—					—	—	—	—	—	
1973	1	7	Blaine Stoughton	Left wing	Canada	Flin Flon Bombers	WCHL	526	258	191	449	204						¿
1973	2	23	Wayne Bianchin	Left wing	Canada	Flin Flon Bombers	WCHL	276	68	41	109	137						
1973	2	27	Colin Campbell	Defence	Canada	Peterborough Petes	OHA	636	25	103	128	1292						¿
1973	4	55	Dennis Owchar	Defence	Canada	Toronto Marlboros	OHA	288	30	85	115	200						
1973	5	71	Guido Tenesi	Defence	Canada	Oshawa Generals	OHA	—	—	—	—	—						
1973	6	87	Don Seiling	Forward	Canada	Oshawa Generals	OHA	—	—	—	—	—						
1973	7	103	Terry Ewasiuk	Left wing	Canada	Victoria Cougars	WCHL	—	—	—	—	—						
1973	8	119	Fred Comrie	Center	Canada	Edmonton Oil Kings	WCHL	—	—	—	—	—						
1973	9	134	Gord Lane ****	Defence	Canada	Edmonton Oil Kings	WCHL	540	19	94	113	1228						
1973	10	150	Randy Aimoe	Defence	Canada	Medicine Hat Tigers	WCHL	—	—	—	—	—						
1973	11	164	Don McLeod	Center	Canada	Saskatoon Blades	WCHL	—	—	—	—	—						
1974	1	8	Pierre Larouche **	Center	Canada	Sorel Black Hawks	QMJHL	812	395	427	822	237						
1974	2	27	Jacques Cossette	Right wing	Canada	Sorel Black Hawks	QMJHL	64	8	6	14	29						
1974	4	62	Mario Faubert	Defence	Canada	Saint Louis Billikens	CCHA	231	21	90	111	222						
1974	5	80	Bruce Aberhart	Goaltender	Canada	London Knights	OHA	—					—	—	—	—	—	
1974	6	98	Buzz Schneider	Left wing	United States	Minnesota Golden Gophers	WCHA	—	—	—	—	—						¿ (Note: Schneider won a Gold medal at the 1980 Winter Olympics)
1974	7	116	Rob Laird	Left wing	Canada	Regina Pats	WCHL	1	0	0	0	0						
1974	8	133	Larry Finck	Defence	Canada	St. Catharines Black Hawks	OHA	—	—	—	—	—						
1974	9	150	Jim Chicoyne	Defence	Canada	Brandon Wheat Kings	WCHL	—	—	—	—	—						
1974	10	166	Rick Uhrich	Right wing	Canada	Brandon Wheat Kings	WCHL	—	—	—	—	—						
1974	11	181	Serge Gamelin	Right wing	Canada	Sorel Black Hawks	QMJHL	—	—	—	—	—						
1974	12	195	Rich Perron	Defence	Canada	Quebec Remparts	QMJHL	—	—	—	—	—						
1974	13	206	Rick Hindmarch	Right wing	Canada	Calgary Dinos	CWUAA	—	—	—	—	—						
1974	14	216	Bill Davis	Defence	Canada	Colgate Red Raiders	ECAC	—	—	—	—	—						¿
1974	15	223	James Mathers	Defence	United States	Northeastern Huskies	ECAC	—	—	—	—	—						(Note: Mathers attended Northeastern University but did not play in any games for the team. He was the first player from Pittsburgh drafted by the Penguins.)
1975	1	13	Gordon Laxton	Goaltender	Canada	New Westminster Bruins	WCHL	17	0	0	0	0	4	9	0	.847	5.55	
1975	2	31	Russ Anderson	Defence	United States	Minnesota Golden Gophers	WCHA	519	22	99	121	1086						
1975	3	49	Paul Baxter	Defence	Canada	Cleveland Crusaders	WHA	472	48	121	169	1564						¿
1975	4	67	Stu Younger	Left wing	United States	Michigan Tech Huskies	WCHA	—	—	—	—	—						
1975	5	85	Kim Clackson	Defence	Canada	Victoria Cougars	WCHL	106	0	8	8	370						¿
1975	6	103	Peter Morris	Defence	Canada	Victoria Cougars	WCHL	—	—	—	—	—						¿
1975	7	121	Mike Will	Center	Canada	Edmonton Oil Kings	WCHL	—	—	—	—	—						
1975	8	139	Tapio Levo	Defence	Finland	Ässät	SM-sarja	107	16	53	69	36						
1975	9	155	Byron Shutt	Left wing	Canada	Bowling Green Falcons	CCHA	—	—	—	—	—						¿
1975	10	170	Frank Salive	Goaltender	Canada	Peterborough Petes	OHA	—					—	—	—	—	—	
1975	11	185	John Glynne	Defence	United States	Vermont Catamounts	ECAC	—	—	—	—	—						
1975	12	196	Lex Hudson	Defence	Canada	Denver Pioneers	WCHA	2	0	0	0	0						
1975	13	202	Dan Tsubouchi	Right wing	Canada	Saint Louis Billikens	CCHA	—	—	—	—	—						
1975	14	206	Bronisla Stankovsky	Right wing	United States	Fargo-Moorhead Sugar Kings	MidJHL	—	—	—	—	—						
1975	16	217	Kelly Secord	Right wing	Canada	New Westminster Bruins	WCHL	—	—	—	—	—						
1976	1	2	Blair Chapman	Right wing	Canada	Saskatoon Blades	WCHL	402	106	125	231	158						
1976	2	19	Greg Malone	Center	Canada	Oshawa Generals	OHA	704	191	310	501	661						
1976	2	29	Peter Marsh	Left wing	Canada	Sherbrooke Castors	QMJHL	278	48	71	119	224						¿
1976	3	47	Morris Lukowich	Left wing	Canada	Medicine Hat Tigers	WCHL	582	199	219	418	584						¿
1976	4	65	Greg Redquest	Goaltender	Canada	Oshawa Generals	OHA	1	0	0	0	0	0	0	0	.700	14.08	
1976	5	83	Brendan Lowe	Defence	Canada	Sherbrooke Castors	QMJHL	—	—	—	—	—						
1976	6	101	Vic Sirko	Defence	Canada	Oshawa Generals	OHA	—	—	—	—	—						
1977	2	30	Jim Hamilton	Left wing	Canada	London Knights	OHA	95	14	18	32	28						
1977	3	48	Kim Davis	Center	Canada	Flin Flon Bombers	WCHL	36	5	7	12	51						
1977	4	66	Mark Johnson	Center	United States	Wisconsin Badgers	WCHA	669	203	305	508	260						(Note: Johnson won a Gold medal at the 1980 Winter Olympics)
1977	6	102	Greg Millen	Goaltender	Canada	Peterborough Petes	OHA	594	0	18	18	72	215	284	89	.874	3.87	
1978	2	25	Mike Meeker	Center	Canada	Peterborough Petes	OHA	4	0	0	0	5						
1978	4	61	Shane Pearsall	Left wing	Canada	Ottawa 67's	OHA	—	—	—	—	—						
1978	5	75	Rob Garner	Center	Canada	Toronto Marlboros	OHA	1	0	0	0	0						
1979	2	31	Paul Marshall	Left wing	Canada	Brantford Alexanders	OHA	95	15	18	33	17						
1979	3	52	Bennett Wolf	Defence	Canada	Kitchener Rangers	OHA	30	0	1	1	133						
1979	4	73	Brian Cross	Defence	Canada	Brantford Alexanders	OHA	—	—	—	—	—						
1979	5	94	Nick Ricci	Goaltender	Canada	Niagara Falls Flyers	OHA	19	0	0	0	2	7	12	0	.854	4.72	
1979	6	115	Marc Chorney	Defence	Canada	North Dakota Fighting Sioux	WCHA	210	8	27	35	209						
1980	1	9	Mike Bullard	Center	Canada	Brantford Alexanders	OHA	727	329	345	674	705						
1980	3	51	Randy Boyd	Defence	Canada	Ottawa 67's	OHA	257	20	67	87	328						
1980	4	72	Tony Feltrin	Defence	Canada	Victoria Cougars	WHL	48	3	3	6	65						
1980	5	93	Doug Shedden	Center	Canada	Sault Ste. Marie Greyhounds	OHA	416	139	186	325	176						
1980	6	114	Pat Graham	Left wing	Canada	Niagara Falls Flyers	OHA	103	11	17	28	136						
1980	8	156	Bob Geale	Center	Canada	Niagara Falls Flyers	OHA	1	0	0	0	2						
1980	9	177	Brian Lundberg	Defence	Canada	Michigan Wolverines	WCHA	1	0	0	0	2						
1980	10	198	Steve McKenzie	Defence	Canada	St. Albert Saints	AJHL	—	—	—	—	—						
1981	2	28	Steve Gatzos	Right wing	Canada	Sault Ste. Marie Greyhounds	OHL	89	15	20	35	83						
1981	3	49	Tom Thornbury	Defence	Canada	Niagara Falls Flyers	OHL	14	1	8	9	16						
1981	4	70	Norm Schmidt	Defence	Canada	Oshawa Generals	OHL	125	23	33	56	73						
1981	6	109	Paul Edwards	Defence	Canada	Oshawa Generals	OHL	—	—	—	—	—						
1981	6	112	Rod Buskas	Defence	Canada	Medicine Hat Tigers	WHL	556	19	63	82	1294						
1981	7	133	Geoff Wilson	Defence	Canada	Winnipeg Warriors	WHL	—	—	—	—	—						
1981	8	154	Mitch Lamoureux	Center	Canada	Oshawa Generals	OHL	73	11	9	20	59						
1981	9	175	Dean DeFazio	Left wing	Canada	Brantford Alexanders	OHL	22	0	2	2	28						
1981	10	196	Dave Hannan **	Left wing	Canada	Brantford Alexanders	OHL	841	114	191	305	942						
1982	1	10	Rich Sutter	Right wing	Canada	Lethbridge Broncos	WHL	874	149	166	315	1411						
1982	2	38	Tim Hrynewich	Left wing	Canada	Sudbury Wolves	OHL	55	6	8	14	82						
1982	3	52	Troy Loney **	Left wing	Canada	Lethbridge Broncos	WHL	624	87	110	197	1091						
1982	5	94	Grant Sasser	Center	Canada	Portland Winter Hawks	WHL	3	0	0	0	0						
1982	7	136	Grant Couture	Center	Canada	Lethbridge Broncos	WHL	—	—	—	—	—						
1982	8	157	Peter Derksen	Center	Canada	Portland Winter Hawks	WHL	—	—	—	—	—						
1982	9	178	Greg Gravel	Center	Canada	Windsor Spitfires	OHL	—	—	—	—	—						
1982	10	199	Stu Wenaas	Defence	Canada	Winnipeg Warriors	WHL	—	—	—	—	—						
1982	11	220	Chris McCauley	Defence	Canada	London Knights	OHL	—	—	—	—	—						
1982	12	241	Stan Bautsch	Goaltender	United States	Hibbing High School	MN-HS	—					—	—	—	—	—	
1983	1	15	Bob Errey **	Left wing	Canada	Peterborough Petes	OHL	895	170	212	382	1005						
1983	2	22	Todd Charlesworth	Defence	Canada	Oshawa Generals	OHL	93	3	9	12	47						
1983	3	58	Mike Rowe	Defence	Canada	Toronto Marlboros	OHL	11	0	0	0	11						
1983	4	63	Frank Pietrangelo *	Goaltender	Canada	Minnesota Golden Gophers	WCHA	141	0	3	3	36	46	59	6	.872	4.12	
1983	6	103	Patrick Emond	Center	Canada	Hull Olympiques	QMJHL	—	—	—	—	—						
1983	7	123	Paul Ames	Defence	United States	Billerica High School	MA-HS	—	—	—	—	—						
1983	9	163	Marty Ketola	Right wing	United States	Cloquet High School	MN-HS	—	—	—	—	—						
1983	10	183	Alex Haidy	Right wing	Canada	Sault Ste. Marie Greyhounds	OHL	—	—	—	—	—						
1983	11	203	Garth Hildebrand	Left wing	Canada	Calgary Wranglers	WHL	—	—	—	—	—						
1983	12	223	Dave Goertz	Defence	Canada	Regina Pats	WHL	2	0	0	0	2						
1984	1	1	Mario Lemieux **	Center	Canada	Laval Voisins	QMJHL	915	690	1033	1723	834						
1984	1	9	Doug Bodger	Defence	Canada	Kamloops Junior Oilers	WHL	1071	106	422	528	1007						
1984	1	16	Roger Belanger	Center	Canada	Kingston Canadians	OHL	44	3	5	8	32						
1984	4	64	Marc Teevens	Center	Canada	Peterborough Petes	OHL	—	—	—	—	—						
1984	5	85	Arto Javanainen	Right wing	Finland	Assat	SM-liiga	14	4	1	5	2						
1984	7	127	Tom Ryan	Defence	United States	Newton North High School	MA-HS	—	—	—	—	—						
1984	9	169	John Del Col	Left wing	Canada	Toronto Marlboros	OHL	—	—	—	—	—						
1984	10	189	Steve Hurt	Right wing	United States	Hill-Murray School	MN-HS	—	—	—	—	—						
1984	11	210	Jim Steen	Center	United States	Moorhead High School	MN-HS	—	—	—	—	—						
1984	12	230	Mark Ziliotto	Forward	Canada	Streetsville Derbys	OHA	—	—	—	—	—						
1985	1	2	Craig Simpson **	Center	Canada	Michigan State Spartans	CCHA	634	247	250	497	659						
1985	2	23	Lee Giffin	Right wing	Canada	Oshawa Generals	OHL	27	1	3	4	9						
1985	3	58	Bruce Racine	Goaltender	Canada	Northeastern Huskies	HEA	11	0	0	0	2	0	3	0	.881	3.13	
1985	5	86	Steve Gotaas	Center	Canada	Prince Albert Raiders	WHL	49	6	9	15	53						
1985	6	107	Kevin Clemens	Left wing	Canada	Regina Pats	WHL	—	—	—	—	—						
1985	6	114	Stuart-Lee Marston	Defence	Canada	Longueuil Chevaliers	QMJHL	—	—	—	—	—						
1985	7	128	Steve Titus	Goaltender	Canada	Cornwall Royals	OHL	—	—	—	—	—						
1985	8	149	Paul Stanton **	Defence	United States	Catholic Memorial School	MA-HS	295	14	49	63	262						
1985	9	170	Jim Paek **	Defence	South Korea	Oshawa Generals	OHL	217	5	29	34	155						
1985	10	191	Steve Shaunessy	Defence	United States	Reading High School	MA-HS	—	—	—	—	—						
1985	11	212	Doug Greschuk	Defence	Canada	St. Albert Saints	AJHL	—	—	—	—	—						
1985	12	233	Gregory Choules	Left wing	Canada	Chicoutimi Sagueneens	QMJHL	—	—	—	—	—						
1986	1	4	Zarley Zalapski	Defence	Canada	Canadian National Team	N/A	637	99	285	384	684						
1986	2	25	Dave Capuano	Left wing	United States	Mount Saint Charles Academy	RI-HS	104	17	38	55	56						
1986	3	46	Brad Aitken	Left wing	Canada	Sault Ste. Marie Greyhounds	OHL	14	1	3	4	25						
1986	4	67	Rob Brown	Left wing	Canada	Kamloops Blazers	WHL	543	190	248	438	599						
1986	5	88	Sandy Smith	Right wing	United States	Brainerd High School	MN-HS	—	—	—	—	—						
1986	6	109	Jeff Daniels	Defence	Canada	Oshawa Generals	OHL	425	17	26	43	83						
1986	7	130	Doug Hobson	Defence	Canada	Prince Albert Raiders	WHL	—	—	—	—	—						
1986	8	151	Steve Rohlik	Right wing	United States	Hill-Murray School	MN-HS	—	—	—	—	—						
1986	9	172	Dave McLlwain	Center	Canada	North Bay Centennials	OHL	501	100	107	207	292						
1986	10	193	Kelly Cain	Center	Canada	London Knights	OHL	—	—	—	—	—						
1986	11	214	Stan Drulia	Right wing	United States	Belleville Bulls	OHL	126	15	27	42	52						
1986	12	235	Rob Wilson	Right wing	United States	Belleville Bulls	OHL	—	—	—	—	—						
1986	S	3	Jeff Lamb	Center	United States	Denver Pioneers	WCHA	—	—	—	—	—						
1986	S	7	Randy Taylor	Defence	Canada	Harvard Crimson	ECAC	—	—	—	—	—						
1987	1	5	Chris Joseph	Defence	Canada	Seattle Thunderbirds	WHL	510	39	112	151	567						
1987	2	26	Rick Tabaracci	Goaltender	Canada	Cornwall Royals	OHL	286	0	8	8	72	93	125	30	.893	2.99	
1987	3	47	Jamie Leach	Right wing	Canada	Hamilton Steelhawks	OHL	81	11	9	20	12						
1987	4	68	Risto Kurkinen	Left wing	Finland	JYP	SM-liiga	—	—	—	—	—						
1987	5	89	Jeff Waver	Defence	Canada	Hamilton Steelhawks	OHL	—	—	—	—	—						
1987	6	110	Shawn McEachern *	Left wing	United States	Matignon High School	MA-HS	911	256	323	579	506						
1987	7	131	Jim Bodden	Center	Canada	Chatham Maroons	WOJHL	—	—	—	—	—						
1987	8	152	Jiří Kučera	Center	Czechoslovakia	HC Dukla Jihlava	Czech 1	—	—	—	—	—						
1987	9	173	John MacDougall	Forward	United States	New Prep School	MA-HS	—	—	—	—	—						
1987	10	194	Daryn McBride	Right wing	Canada	Denver Pioneers	WCHA	—	—	—	—	—						
1987	11	215	Mark Carlson	Left wing	United States	Philadelphia Junior Flyers	N/A	—	—	—	—	—						
1987	12	236	Ake Lilljebjorn	Goaltender	Sweden	Brynas IF	SEL	—					—	—	—	—	—	
1987	S	5	Dan Shea	Left wing	United States	Boston College Eagles	HEA	—	—	—	—	—						
1987	S	9	John Leonard	Defence	United States	Bowdoin	ECAC East	—	—	—	—	—						
1988	1	4	Darrin Shannon	Left wing	Canada	Windsor Spitfires	OHL	506	87	163	250	344						
1988	2	25	Mark Major	Left wing	Canada	North Bay Centennials	OHL	2	0	0	0	5						
1988	3	62	Daniel Gauthier	Left wing	Canada	Victoriaville Tigres	QMJHL	5	0	0	0	0						
1988	4	67	Mark Recchi ***	Right wing	Canada	Kamloops Blazers	WHL	1652	577	956	1533	1033						
1988	5	88	Greg Andrusak	Defence	Canada	Minnesota–Duluth Bulldogs	WCHA	28	0	6	6	16						
1988	7	130	Troy Mick	Defence	Canada	Portland Winter Hawks	WHL	—	—	—	—	—						
1988	8	151	Jeff Blaeser	Right wing	United States	St. John's Preparatory School	MA-HS	—	—	—	—	—						
1988	9	172	Rob Gaudreau	Right wing	United States	Bishop Hendricken High School	RI-HS	231	51	54	105	69						
1988	10	193	Don Pancoe	Defence	Canada	Hamilton Steelhawks	OHL	—	—	—	—	—						
1988	11	214	Cory Laylin	Defence	United States	Apollo High School	MN-HS	—	—	—	—	—						
1988	12	235	Darren Stolk	Defence	Canada	Lethbridge Hurricanes	WHL	—	—	—	—	—						
1988	S	4	Paul Polillo	Center	Canada	Western Michigan Broncos	CCHA	—	—	—	—	—						
1988	S	9	Shawn Lillie	Center	Canada	Colgate Red Raiders	ECAC	—	—	—	—	—						
1989	1	16	Jamie Heward	Defence	Canada	Regina Pats	WHL	394	38	86	124	221						
1989	2	37	Paul Laus	Defence	Canada	Niagara Falls Thunder	OHL	530	14	58	72	1702						
1989	3	58	John Brill	Left wing	United States	Grand Rapids High School	MN-HS	—	—	—	—	—						
1989	4	79	Todd Nelson	Defence	Canada	Prince Albert Raiders	WHL	3	1	0	1	2						
1989	5	100	Tom Nevers	Center	United States	Edina High School	MN-HS	—	—	—	—	—						
1989	6	121	Mike Markovich	Defence	United States	Denver Pioneers	WCHA	—	—	—	—	—						
1989	6	126	Mike Needham *	Right wing	Canada	Kamloops Blazers	WHL	86	9	5	14	16						
1989	7	142	Pat Schafhauser	Defence	United States	Hill-Murray School	MN-HS	—	—	—	—	—						
1989	8	163	David Shute	Left wing	United States	Victoria Cougars	WHL	—	—	—	—	—						
1989	9	184	Andrew Wolf	Defence	Canada	Victoria Cougars	WHL	—	—	—	—	—						
1989	10	205	Greg Hagen	Forward	United States	Hill-Murray School	MN-HS	—	—	—	—	—						
1989	11	226	Scott Farrell	Defence	Canada	Spokane Chiefs	WHL	—	—	—	—	—						
1989	12	247	Jason Smart	Center	Canada	Saskatoon Blades	WHL	—	—	—	—	—						
1989	S	21	John DePourcq	Center	Canada	Ferris State Bulldogs	CCHA	—	—	—	—	—						
1990	1	5	Jaromir Jagr **	Right wing	Czechoslovakia	HC Kladno	Czech 1	1733	766	1155	1921	1167						
1990	3	61	Joe Dziedzic	Left wing	United States	Edison High School	MN-HS	130	14	14	28	131						
1990	4	68	Chris Tamer	Defence	United States	Michigan Wolverines	CCHA	644	21	64	85	1183						
1990	5	89	Brian Farrell	Left wing	United States	Avon Old Farms	CT-HS	—	—	—	—	—						
1990	6	107	Ian Moran	Right wing	United States	Belmont Hill School	MA-HS	489	21	50	71	321						
1990	6	110	Denis Casey	Goaltender	Canada	Colorado College Tigers	WCHA	—					—	—	—	—	—	
1990	7	130	Mika Välilä	Center	Sweden	Tappara	SM-liiga	—	—	—	—	—						
1990	7	131	Ken Plaquin	Defence	Canada	Michigan Tech Huskies	WCHA	—	—	—	—	—						
1990	7	145	Patrick Neaton	Defence	Canada	Michigan Wolverines	CCHA	9	1	1	2	12						
1990	8	152	Petteri Koskimaki	Center	Finland	Boston University Terriers	HEA	—	—	—	—	—						
1990	9	173	Ladislav Karabin	Left wing	Czechoslovakia	Bratislava Slovan	Czech 1	9	0	0	0	2						
1990	10	194	Tim Fingerhut	Left wing	United States	Canterbury School	CT-HS	—	—	—	—	—						
1990	11	215	Michael Thompson	Right wing	Canada	Michigan State Spartans	CCHA	—	—	—	—	—						
1990	12	236	Brian Bruininks	Defence	United States	Colorado College Tigers	WCHA	—	—	—	—	—						
1990	S	5	Joe Dragon	Center	Canada	Cornell Big Red	ECAC	—	—	—	—	—						
1990	S	10	Savo Mitrovic	Center	Canada	New Hampshire Wildcats	HEA	—	—	—	—	—						
1991	1	16	Markus Näslund	Left wing	Sweden	Modo Hockey	SEL	1117	395	474	869	736						
1991	2	38	Rusty Fitzgerald	Center	United States	East High School	MN-HS	25	2	2	4	12						
1991	3	60	Shane Peacock	Defence	United States	Lethbridge Hurricanes	WHL	—	—	—	—	—						
1991	4	82	Joe Tamminen	Left wing	United States	Virginia High School	MN-HS	—	—	—	—	—						
1991	5	104	Rob Melanson	Defence	Canada	Hull Olympiques	QMJHL	—	—	—	—	—						
1991	6	126	Brian Clifford	Right wing	United States	Nichols High School	NY-HS	—	—	—	—	—						
1991	7	148	Ed Patterson	Right wing	Canada	Kamloops Blazers	WHL	68	3	3	6	56						
1991	8	170	Peter McLaughlin	Defence	United States	Belmont Hill School	MA-HS	—	—	—	—	—						
1991	9	192	Jeff Lembke	Goaltender	United States	Omaha Lancers	USHL	—					—	—	—	—	—	
1991	10	214	Chris Tok	Defence	United States	Greenway High School	MN-HS	—	—	—	—	—						
1991	11	236	Paul Dyck	Defence	Canada	Moose Jaw Warriors	WHL	—	—	—	—	—						
1991	12	258	Pasi Huura	Defence	Finland	Ilves	SM-liiga	—	—	—	—	—						
1991	S	22	Greg Carvel	Center	United States	St. Lawrence Saints	ECAC	—	—	—	—	—						
1992	1	19	Martin Straka	Center	Czechoslovakia	HC Plzeň	Czech 1	954	257	460	717	360						
1992	2	43	Marc Hussey	Defence	Canada	Moose Jaw Warriors	WHL	—	—	—	—	—						
1992	3	67	Travis Thiessen	Defence	Canada	Moose Jaw Warriors	WHL	—	—	—	—	—						
1992	4	91	Todd Klassen	Right wing	Canada	Tri-City Americans	WHL	—	—	—	—	—						
1992	5	115	Philippe DeRouville	Goaltender	Canada	Verdun College-Francais	QMJHL	3	0	0	0	0	1	2	0	.903	3.16	
1992	6	139	Artem Kopot	Defence	Russia	Traktor Chelyabinsk	CIS	—	—	—	—	—						(Note: Kopot was killed in a single-car crash shortly after being drafted)
1992	7	163	Jan Alinc	Center	Czechoslovakia	HC Litvinov	Czech 1	—	—	—	—	—						
1992	8	187	Fran Bussey	Left wing	United States	East High School	MN-HS	—	—	—	—	—						
1992	9	211	Brian Bonin	Center	United States	White Bear Lake High School	MN-HS	12	0	0	0	0						
1992	10	235	Brian Callahan	Left wing	United States	Belmont Hill School	MA-HS	—	—	—	—	—						
1993	1	26	Stefan Bergqvist	Defence	Sweden	Leksands IF	SEL	7	0	0	0	9						
1993	2	52	Domenic Pittis	Center	Canada	Lethbridge Hurricanes	WHL	86	5	11	16	71						
1993	3	62	Dave Roche	Left wing	Canada	Lethbridge Hurricanes	WHL	171	15	15	30	334						
1993	4	104	Jonas Junkka	Defence	Sweden	Kiruna IF	Division 1	—	—	—	—	—						
1993	5	130	Chris Kelleher	Defence	United States	Saint Sebastian's School	MA-HS	1	0	0	0	0						
1993	6	156	Patrick Lalime	Goaltender	Canada	Shawinigan Cataractes	QMJHL	444	0	6	6	58	200	174	48	.905	2.58	
1993	7	182	Sean Selmser	Left wing	Canada	Red Deer Rebels	WHL	1	0	0	0	5						
1993	8	208	Larry McMorran	Center	Canada	Seattle Thunderbirds	WHL	—	—	—	—	—						
1993	9	234	Tim Harberts	Center	United States	Wayzata High School	MN-HS	—	—	—	—	—						
1993	10	260	Leonid Toropchenko	Center	Russia	Springfield Indians	AHL	—	—	—	—	—						
1993	11	286	Hans Jonsson	Defence	Sweden	Modo Hockey	SEL	242	10	38	48	92						
1994	1	24	Chris Wells	Center	Canada	Seattle Thunderbirds	WHL	195	9	20	29	193						
1994	2	50	Richard Park	Center	South Korea	Belleville Bulls	OHL	738	102	139	241	266						
1994	3	57	Sven Butenschon	Defence	Germany	Brandon Wheat Kings	WHL	140	2	12	14	86						
1994	3	73	Greg Crozier	Left wing	Canada	Lawrence Academy	MA-HS	1	0	0	0	0						
1994	3	76	Alexei Krivchenkov	Defence	Russia	HC CSKA Moscow	IHL-R	—	—	—	—	—						
1994	4	104	Tom O'Connor	Defence	United States	Springfield Olympics	EJHL	—	—	—	—	—						
1994	5	128	Clint Johnson	Left wing	United States	East High School	MN-HS	—	—	—	—	—						
1994	6	154	Valentin Morozov	Left wing	Russia	HC CSKA Moscow	IHL-R	—	—	—	—	—						
1994	7	161	Serge Aubin	Center	Canada	Granby Bisons	QMJHL	374	44	64	108	361						
1994	7	180	Drew Palmer	Defence	United States	Seattle Thunderbirds	WHL	—	—	—	—	—						
1994	8	206	Boris Zelenko	Center	Russia	HC CSKA Moscow	IHL-R	—	—	—	—	—						
1994	9	232	Jason Godbout	Defence	United States	Hill-Murray School	MN-HS	—	—	—	—	—						
1994	10	258	Mikhail Kazakevich	Center	Russia	Torpedo Yaroslavl	IHL-R	—	—	—	—	—						
1994	11	284	Brian Leitza	Goaltender	United States	Sioux City Musketeers	USHL	—					—	—	—	—	—	
1995	1	24	Alexei Morozov	Right wing	Russia	Krylya Sovetov Moscow	IHL-R	451	84	135	219	98						
1995	3	76	Jean-Sébastien Aubin	Goaltender	Canada	Sherbrooke Faucons	QMJHL	218	0	3	3	10	80	83	16	.900	2.93	
1995	4	102	Oleg Belov	Right wing	Russia	HC CSKA Moscow	IHL-R	—	—	—	—	—						
1995	5	128	Jan Hrdina	Center	Czech Republic	Seattle Thunderbirds	WHL	513	101	196	297	341						
1995	6	154	Alexei Kolkunov	Center	Russia	Krylya Sovetov Moscow	IHL-R	—	—	—	—	—						
1995	7	180	Derrick Pyke	Right wing	Canada	Halifax Mooseheads	QMJHL	—	—	—	—	—						
1995	8	206	Sergei Voronov	Defence	Russia	Dynamo Moscow	IHL-R	—	—	—	—	—						
1995	9	232	Frank Ivankovic	Goaltender	Canada	Oshawa Generals	OHL	—					—	—	—	—	—	
1996	1	23	Craig Hillier	Goaltender	Canada	Ottawa 67's	OHL	—					—	—	—	—	—	
1996	2	28	Pavel Skrbek	Defence	Czech Republic	HC Poldi Kladno	Czech	12	0	0	0	8						
1996	3	72	Boyd Kane	Left wing	Canada	Regina Pats	WHL	31	0	3	3	39						
1996	3	77	Borys Protsenko	Center	Ukraine	Calgary Hitmen	WHL	31	0	3	3	39						
1996	4	105	Michal Rozsíval	Defence	Czech Republic	Swift Current Broncos	WHL	963	68	241	309	704						
1996	6	150	Peter Bergman	Center	Canada	Kamloops Blazers	WHL	—	—	—	—	—						
1996	7	186	Éric Meloche	Right wing	Canada	Cornwall Colts	CJHL	74	9	11	20	36						
1996	9	238	Timo Seikkula	Center	Finland	JHT Kalajoki	Divisioona	—	—	—	—	—						
1997	1	17	Robert Dome	Right wing	Slovakia	Las Vegas Thunder	IHL	53	7	7	14	12						
1997	2	44	Brian Gaffaney	Center	United States	North Iowa Huskies	USHL	—	—	—	—	—						
1997	3	71	Josef Melichar	Defence	Czech Republic	HC Ceske Budejovice	Czech	349	7	42	49	300						
1997	4	97	Alexander Mathieu	Center	Canada	Halifax Mooseheads	QMJHL	—	—	—	—	—						
1997	5	124	Harlan Pratt	Defence	Canada	Prince Albert Raiders	WHL	—	—	—	—	—						
1997	6	152	Petr Havelka	Left wing	Czech Republic	AC Sparta Prague	Czech	—	—	—	—	—						
1997	7	179	Mark Moore	Defence	Canada	Harvard Crimson	ECAC	—	—	—	—	—						
1997	8	208	Andrew Ference *	Defence	Canada	Portland Winter Hawks	WHL	907	43	182	225	753						
1997	9	234	Eric Lind	Defence	United States	Avon Old Farms	CT-HS	—	—	—	—	—						
1998	1	23	Milan Kraft	Center	Czech Republic	HC Keramika Plzeň	Czech	207	41	41	82	52						
1998	2	54	Alexander Zevakhin	Left wing	Russia	HC CSKA Moscow	RHL	—	—	—	—	—						
1998	3	80	David Cameron	Center	Canada	Prince Albert Raiders	WHL	—	—	—	—	—						
1998	4	110	Scott Myers	Goaltender	Canada	Prince George Cougars	WHL	—					—	—	—	—	—	
1998	5	134	Rob Scuderi **	Defence	United States	Boston University Terriers	HEA	783	8	102	110	198						
1998	6	169	Jan Fadrný	Left wing	Czech Republic	HC Slavia Praha	Czech	—	—	—	—	—						
1998	7	196	Joel Scherban	Center	Canada	London Knights	OHL	—	—	—	—	—						
1998	8	224	Mika Lehto	Goaltender	Finland	Assat	SM-liiga	—					—	—	—	—	—	
1998	9	244	Toby Petersen	Center	United States	Colorado College Tigers	WCHA	398	33	48	81	50						
1998	9	254	Matt Hussey	Center	United States	Avon Old Farms	CT-HS	21	2	2	4	2						
1999	1	18	Konstantin Koltsov	Right wing	Belarus	Severstal Cherepovets	RSL	144	12	26	38	50						
1999	2	51	Matt Murley	Left wing	United States	Rensselaer Engineers	ECAC	62	2	7	9	38						
1999	2	57	Jeremy Van Hoof	Defence	Canada	Ottawa 67's	OHL	—	—	—	—	—						
1999	3	86	Sébastien Caron	Goaltender	Canada	Rimouski Océanic	QMJHL	95	0	1	1	12	26	48	12	.892	3.45	
1999	4	115	Ryan Malone	Left wing	United States	Omaha Lancers	USHL	647	179	191	370	693						
1999	5	144	Tomas Skvaridlo	Right wing	Slovakia	HKM Zvolen	Slovak	—	—	—	—	—						
1999	5	157	Vladimir Malenkikh	Defence	Russia	HC Lada Togliatti	RSL	—	—	—	—	—						
1999	6	176	Doug Meyer	Left wing	United States	Minnesota Golden Gophers	WCHA	—	—	—	—	—						
1999	7	204	Tom Kostopoulos	Right wing	Canada	London Knights	OHL	630	61	96	157	723						
1999	8	233	Darcy Robinson	Defence	Canada	Saskatoon Blades	WHL	—	—	—	—	—						(Note: Robinson died due to a heart attack caused by an undiagnosed heart condition in 2007)
1999	9	261	Andrew McPherson	Center	Canada	Rensselaer Engineers	ECAC	—	—	—	—	—						
2000	1	18	Brooks Orpik **	Defence	United States	Boston College Eagles	HEA	1035	18	176	194	972						
2000	2	52	Shane Endicott	Defence	Canada	Seattle Thunderbirds	WHL	45	1	2	3	47						
2000	3	84	Peter Hamerlík	Goaltender	Slovakia	HK 36 Skalica	Slovak	—					—	—	—	—	—	
2000	4	124	Michel Ouellet	Right wing	Canada	Rimouski Oceanic	QMJHL	190	52	64	116	58						
2000	5	146	David Kočí	Defence	Czech Republic	AC Sparta Prague	Czech	142	3	1	4	461						
2000	6	185	Patrick Foley	Defence	United States	New Hampshire Wildcats	HEA	—	—	—	—	—						
2000	7	216	Jim Abbott	Forward	United States	New Hampshire Wildcats	HEA	—	—	—	—	—						
2000	8	248	Steven Crampton	Left wing	Canada	Moose Jaw Warriors	WHL	—	—	—	—	—						
2000	9	273	Roman Šimíček	Center	Czech Republic	HPK	SM-liiga	63	7	10	17	59						
2000	9	280	Nick Boucher	Goaltender	Canada	Dartmouth Big Green	ECAC	—					—	—	—	—	—	
2001	1	21	Colby Armstrong	Right wing	Canada	Red Deer Rebels	WHL	476	89	120	209	376						
2001	2	54	Noah Welch	Defence	United States	Saint Sebastian's School	MA-HS	75	4	5	9	58						
2001	3	86	Drew Fata	Defence	Canada	Toronto St. Michael's Majors	OHL	8	1	1	2	9						
2001	3	96	Alexandre Rouleau	Defence	Canada	Val d'Or Foreurs	QMJHL	—	—	—	—	—						
2001	4	120	Tomáš Surový	Left wing	Slovakia	HK Poprad	Slovak	126	27	32	59	71						
2001	4	131	Ben Eaves	Center	United States	Boston College Eagles	HEA	—	—	—	—	—						
2001	5	156	Andy Schneider	Defence	United States	Lincoln Stars	USHL	—	—	—	—	—						
2001	7	217	Tomáš Duba	Goaltender	Czech Republic	AC Sparta Prague	Czech	—					—	—	—	—	—	
2001	8	250	Brandon Crawford-West	Goaltender	United States	Texas Tornado	NAHL	—					—	—	—	—	—	
2002	1	5	Ryan Whitney	Defence	United States	Boston University Terriers	HEA	481	50	209	259	383						
2002	2	35	Ondřej Němec	Defence	Czech Republic	VHK Vsetín	Czech	—	—	—	—	—						
2002	3	69	Erik Christensen	Defence	Canada	Kamloops Blazers	WHL	387	68	95	163	162						
2002	4	101	Daniel Fernholm	Defence	Sweden	Djurgårdens IF U20	SWE-JR	—	—	—	—	—						
2002	5	136	Andy Sertich	Defence	United States	Greenway High School	MN-HS	—	—	—	—	—						
2002	5	137	Cam Paddock	Center	Canada	Kelowna Rockets	WHL	16	2	1	3	0						
2002	6	171	Bobby Goepfert	Goaltender	United States	Cedar Rapids RoughRiders	USHL	—					—	—	—	—	—	
2002	7	202	Patrik Bartschi	Forward	Switzerland	EHC Kloten	NLA	—	—	—	—	—						
2002	8	234	Maxime Talbot *	Center	Canada	Hull Olympiques	QMJHL	704	91	113	204	495						
2002	8	239	Ryan Lannon	Defence	United States	Harvard Crimson	ECAC	—	—	—	—	—						
2002	9	265	Dwight LaBrosse	Goaltender	United States	Guelph Storm	OHL	—					—	—	—	—	—	
2003	1	1	Marc-André Fleury ***	Goaltender	Canada	Cape Breton Screaming Eagles	QMJHL	1051	0	22	22	86	575	339	97	.912	2.60	
2003	2	32	Ryan Stone	Center	Canada	Brandon Wheat Kings	WHL	35	0	7	7	55						
2003	3	70	Jonathan Filewich	Right wing	Canada	Prince George Cougars	WHL	5	0	0	0	0						
2003	3	73	Daniel Carcillo **	Left wing	Canada	Sarnia Sting	OHL	429	48	52	100	1233						
2003	4	121	Paul Bissonnette	Left wing	Canada	Saginaw Spirit	OHL	202	7	15	22	340						
2003	5	161	Evgeny Isakov	Left wing	Russia	Severstal Cherepovets	RSL	—	—	—	—	—						
2003	6	169	Lukáš Bolf	Defence	Czech Republic	HC Sparta Praha U20	Czech U20	—	—	—	—	—						
2003	7	199	Andy Chiodo	Goaltender	Canada	Toronto St. Michael's Majors	OHL	8	0	0	0	0	3	4	1	.892	3.46	
2003	7	229	Stephen Dixon	Center	Canada	Cape Breton Screaming Eagles	QMJHL	—	—	—	—	—						
2003	8	232	Joe Jensen	Left wing	United States	St. Cloud State Huskies	WCHA	6	1	0	1	2						
2003	9	263	Matt Moulson	Left wing	Canada	Cornell Big Red	ECAC	650	176	193	369	122						
2004	1	2	Evgeni Malkin ***	Center	Russia	Metallurg Magnitogorsk	RSL	1269	533	874	1407	1263						
2004	2	31	Johannes Salmonsson	Left wing	Sweden	Djurgårdens IF	SEL	—	—	—	—	—						
2004	2	61	Alex Goligoski *	Defence	United States	Sioux Falls Stampede	USHL	1078	87	388	475	376						
2004	3	67	Nick Johnson	Left wing	Canada	St. Albert Saints	AJHL	113	14	23	37	52						
2004	3	85	Brian Gifford	Center	United States	Moorhead High School	MN-HS	—	—	—	—	—						
2004	4	99	Tyler Kennedy *	Right wing	Canada	Sault Ste. Marie Greyhounds	OHL	527	89	126	215	239						
2004	5	130	Michal Sersen	Defence	Slovakia	Rimouski Oceanic	QMJHL	—	—	—	—	—						
2004	6	164	Moises Gutierrez	Right wing	United States	Kamloops Blazers	WHL	—	—	—	—	—						
2004	7	194	Chris Peluso	Defence	United States	Brainard High School	MN-HS	—	—	—	—	—						
2004	7	222	Jordan Morrison	Right wing	Canada	Peterborough Petes	OHL	—	—	—	—	—						
2004	8	228	David Brown	Goaltender	Canada	Notre Dame Fighting Irish	WCHA	—					—	—	—	—	—	
2004	9	259	Brian Ihnačák	Center	Canada	Brown Bears	ECAC	—	—	—	—	—						
2005	1	1	Sidney Crosby ***	Center	Canada	Rimouski Oceanic	QMJHL	1420	654	1107	1761	898						
2005	2	61	Michael Gergen	Defence	United States	Shattuck-Saint Mary's	MN-HS	—	—	—	—	—						
2005	3	62	Kris Letang ***	Defence	Canada	Val d'Or Foreurs	QMJHL	1235	178	628	806	843						
2005	4	125	Tommi Leinonen	Defence	Finland	Oulun Karpat U20	U20 SM-liiga	—	—	—	—	—						
2005	5	126	Tim Crowder	Right wing	Canada	Surrey Eagles	BCHL	—	—	—	—	—						
2005	6	194	Jean-Philipp Paquet	Center	Canada	Shawinigan Cataractes	QMJHL	—	—	—	—	—						
2005	7	195	Joe Vitale	Defence	United States	Sioux Falls Stampede	USHL	234	11	33	44	156						
2006	1	2	Jordan Staal *	Center	Canada	Peterborough Petes	OHL	1403	318	429	747	644						
2006	2	32	Carl Sneep	Defence	United States	Brainard High School	MN-HS	1	0	1	1	0						
2006	3	65	Brian Strait	Defence	United States	USNTDP	N/A	187	6	23	29	91						
2006	5	125	Chad Johnson	Goaltender	Canada	Alaska–Fairbanks Nanooks	CCHA	192	0	3	3	0	80	72	15	.907	2.73	
2006	7	185	Timo Seppanen	Defence	Finland	HIFK Hockey	SM-liiga	—	—	—	—	—						
2007	1	20	Angelo Esposito	Center	Canada	Quebec Remparts	QMJHL	—	—	—	—	—						
2007	2	51	Keven Veilleux	Right wing	Canada	Victoriaville Tigres	QMJHL	—	—	—	—	—						
2007	3	78	Robert Bortuzzo *	Defence	Canada	Kitchener Rangers	OHL	577	20	56	76	533						
2007	3	80	Casey Pierro-Zabotel	Left wing	Canada	Merritt Centennials	BCHL	—	—	—	—	—						
2007	4	111	Luca Caputi	Left wing	Canada	Mississauga IceDogs	OHL	35	3	6	9	20						
2007	4	118	Alex Grant	Defence	Canada	Saint John Sea Dogs	QMJHL	7	2	0	2	9						
2007	5	141	Jake Muzzin *	Defence	Canada	Sault Ste. Marie Greyhounds	OHL	683	69	225	294	399						
2007	6	171	Dustin Jeffrey	Center	Canada	Sault Ste. Marie Greyhounds	OHL	131	18	15	33	12						
2008	4	120	Nathan Moon	Center	Canada	Kingston Frontenacs	OHL	—	—	—	—	—						
2008	5	150	Alexander Pechursky	Goaltender	Russia	Metallurg Magnitogorsk-2	RUS-3	1	0	0	0	0	0	0	0	.923	1.69	
2008	6	180	Patrick Killeen	Goaltender	Canada	Brampton Battalion	OHL	—					—	—	—	—	—	
2008	7	210	Nicholas D'Agostino	Defence	Canada	St. Michael's Buzzers	OJHL	—	—	—	—	—						
2009	1	30	Simon Despres	Defence	Canada	Saint John Sea Dogs	QMJHL	193	6	37	43	150						
2009	2	61	Philip Samuelsson	Defence	Sweden	Chicago Steel	USHL	13	0	0	0	2						
2009	3	63	Ben Hanowski	Right wing	United States	Little Falls High School	MN-HS	16	1	2	3	2						
2009	4	121	Nick Petersen	Right wing	Canada	Shawinigan Cataractes	QMJHL	—	—	—	—	—						
2009	5	123	Alex Velischek	Defence	United States	Delbarton School	NJ-HS	—	—	—	—	—						
2009	5	151	Andy Bathgate	Center	Canada	Belleville Bulls	OHL	—	—	—	—	—						(Note: Bathgate's namesake was his Hall of Fame grandfather, one of the original Penguins)
2009	6	181	Viktor Ekbom	Defence	Sweden	IK Oskarshamn	SWE-1	—	—	—	—	—						
2010	1	20	Beau Bennett	Right wing	United States	Penticton Vees	BCHL	200	24	40	64	52						
2010	3	80	Bryan Rust **	Right wing	United States	USNTDP	USHL	710	232	270	502	231						
2010	4	110	Tom Kuhnhackl **	Right wing	Germany	Landshut Cannibals	GER-2	232	18	36	54	60						
2010	5	140	Kenny Agostino	Left wing	United States	Delbarton School	NJ-HS	86	8	22	30	40						
2010	6	152	Joe Rogalski	Defence	United States	Sarnia Sting	OHL	—	—	—	—	—						
2010	6	170	Reid McNeill	Defence	Canada	London Knights	OHL	—	—	—	—	—						
2011	1	23	Joe Morrow	Defence	Canada	Portland Winterhawks	WHL	162	9	23	32	62						
2011	2	54	Scott Harrington	Defence	Canada	London Knights	OHL	255	11	38	49	87						
2011	5	144	Dominik Uher	Defence	Czech Republic	Spokane Chiefs	WHL	2	0	0	0	0						
2011	6	174	Josh Archibald *	Right wing	United States	Brainerd High School	MN-HS	305	45	38	83	143						
2011	7	209	Scott Wilson *	Center	Canada	Georgetown Raiders	OJHL	193	20	31	51	58						
2012	1	8	Derrick Pouliot	Defence	Canada	Portland Winterhawks	WHL	226	8	46	54	91						
2012	1	22	Olli Maatta **	Defence	Finland	London Knights	OHL	804	44	166	210	182						
2012	2	52	Teddy Blueger*	Center	Latvia	Shattuck-Saint Mary's	MN-HS	453	58	111	169	188						
2012	3	81	Oskar Sundqvist *	Center	Sweden	Skellefteå AIK U20	J20 SuperElit	545	67	114	181	231						
2012	3	83	Matt Murray **	Goaltender	Canada	Sault Ste. Marie Greyhounds	OHL	279	0	5	5	10	147	89	25	.910	2.79	
2012	4	92	Matia Marcantuoni	Center	Canada	Kitchener Rangers	OHL	—	—	—	—	—						
2012	4	113	Sean Maguire	Goaltender	Canada	Powell River Kings	BCHL	—					—	—	—	—	—	
2012	5	143	Clark Seymour	Defence	Canada	Peterborough Petes	OHL	—	—	—	—	—						
2012	6	173	Anton Zlobin	Left wing	Canada	Shawinigan Cataractes	QMJHL	—	—	—	—	—						
2013	2	44	Tristan Jarry	Goaltender	Canada	Edmonton Oil Kings	WHL	326	1	12	13	22	170	106	34	.907	2.80	
2013	3	77	Jake Guentzel *	Left wing	United States	Sioux City Musketeers	USHL	681	306	353	659	317						
2013	4	119	Ryan Segalla	Defence	United States	Salisbury School	CT-HS	—	—	—	—	—						
2013	6	164	Dane Birks	Defence	Canada	Merritt Centennials	BCHL	—	—	—	—	—						
2013	6	179	Blaine Byron	Center	Canada	Smiths Falls Bears	CCHL	—	—	—	—	—						
2013	7	209	Troy Josephs	Center	Canada	St. Michael's Buzzers	OJHL	—	—	—	—	—						
2014	1	22	Kasperi Kapanen	Right wing	Finland	KalPa	Liiga	568	98	141	239	140						
2014	4	113	Sam Lafferty	Right wing	United States	Deerfield Academy	MA-HS	378	41	51	92	196						
2014	5	145	Anthony Angello	Center	United States	Omaha Lancers	USHL	31	3	2	5	14						
2014	6	173	Jaden Lindo	Right wing	Canada	Owen Sound Attack	OHL	—	—	—	—	—						
2014	7	203	Jeff Taylor	Defence	Canada	Union Dutchmen	ECAC	—	—	—	—	—						
2015	2	46	Daniel Sprong	Right wing	Netherlands	Charlottetown Islanders	QMJHL	374	87	79	166	68						
2015	5	137	Dominik Simon	Center	Czech Republic	HC Skoda Plzen	Czech	256	22	55	77	80						
2015	6	167	Frederik Tiffels	Left wing	Germany	Western Michigan Broncos	NCHC	—	—	—	—	—						
2015	7	197	Nikita Pavlychev	Center	Russia	Des Moines Buccaneers	USHL	—	—	—	—	—						
2016	2	55	Filip Gustavsson	Goaltender	Sweden	Lulea HF	SHL	219	1	5	6	0	111	74	26	.911	2.67	
2016	2	61	Kasper Bjorkqvist	Right wing	Finland	Blues U20	U20 SM-liiga	6	1	0	1	2						
2016	3	77	Connor Hall	Defence	Canada	Kitchener Rangers	OHL	—	—	—	—	—						
2016	4	121	Ryan Jones	Defence	United States	Lincoln Stars	USHL	—	—	—	—	—						
2016	5	151	Niclas Almari	Defence	Finland	Jokerit U20	U20 SM-liiga	—	—	—	—	—						
2016	6	181	Joe Masonius	Defence	United States	Connecticut Huskies	HEA	—	—	—	—	—						
2017	2	51	Zachary Lauzon	Defence	Canada	Rouyn-Noranda Huskies	QMJHL	—	—	—	—	—						
2017	3	93	Clayton Phillips	Defence	United States	Fargo Force	USHL	—	—	—	—	—						
2017	5	152	Jan Drozg	Right wing	Slovenia	Leksands IF J20	J20 SuperElit	—	—	—	—	—						
2017	5	155	Linus Olund	Center	Sweden	Brynas IF	SHL	—	—	—	—	—						
2017	6	186	Antti Palojarvi	Defence	Finland	Lukko U20	U20 SM-liiga	—	—	—	—	—						
2017	7	217	Will Reilly	Defence	Canada	Rensselaer Engineers	ECAC	—	—	—	—	—						
2018	2	53	Calen Addison	Defence	Canada	Lethbridge Hurricanes	WHL	152	6	44	50	96						
2018	2	58	Filip Hallander	Center	Sweden	Timra IK	SWE-1	16	1	3	4	2						
2018	5	129	Justin Almeida	Center	Canada	Moose Jaw Warriors	WHL	—	—	—	—	—						
2018	6	177	Liam Gorman	Center	United States	Chicago Steel	USHL	—	—	—	—	—						
2019	1	21	Samuel Poulin	Right wing	Canada	Sherbrooke Phoenix	QMJHL	15	0	2	2	6						
2019	3	74	Nathan Legare	Right wing	Canada	Baie-Comeau Drakkar	QMJHL	4	0	0	0	0						
2019	5	145	Judd Caufield	Right wing	United States	USNTDP	USHL	—	—	—	—	—						
2019	7	203	Valtteri Puustinen	Wing	Finland	HPK	Liiga	66	7	17	24	10						
2019	7	211	Santeri Airola	Defence	Finland	SaiPa U20	U20 SM-liiga	—	—	—	—	—						
2020	2	52	Joel Blomqvist	Goaltender	Finland	Oulun Karpat	Liiga	15	0	0	0	0	4	9	1	.885	3.81	
2020	3	77	Calle Clang	Goaltender	Sweden	Rogle BK J20	J20 SuperElit	—					—	—	—	—	—	
2020	4	108	Lukas Svejkovsky	Right wing	United States	Medicine Hat Tigers	WHL	—	—	—	—	—						
2020	5	149	Raivis Ansons	Right wing	Latvia	Baie-Comeau Drakkar	QMJHL	—	—	—	—	—						
2020	6	170	Chase Yoder	Forward	United States	USNTDP	USHL	—	—	—	—	—						
2021	2	58	Tristan Broz	Center	United States	Fargo Force	USHL	1	0	0	0	0						
2021	5	154	Isaac Belliveau	Defence	Canada	Gatineau Olympiques	QMJHL	—	—	—	—	—						
2021	7	194	Ryan McCleary	Defence	Canada	Portland Winterhawks	WHL	—	—	—	—	—						
2021	7	215	Daniel Laatsch	Defence	United States	Sioux City Musketeers	USHL	—	—	—	—	—						
2021	7	218	Kirill Tankov	Center	Russia	SKA Varyagi	MHL	—	—	—	—	—						
2022	1	21	Owen Pickering	Defence	Canada	Swift Current Broncos	WHL	29	1	2	3	8						
2022	4	118	Sergei Murashov	Goaltender	Russia	Loko Yaroslavl	MHL	5	0	0	0	0	1	1	2	.897	2.56	
2022	5	150	Zam Plante	Center	United States	Chicago Steel	USHL	—	—	—	—	—						
2022	6	167	Nolan Collins	Defence	Canada	Sudbury Wolves	OHL	—	—	—	—	—						
2022	6	182	Luke Devlin	Center	United States	St. Andrew's College	CAHS	—	—	—	—	—						
2023	1	14	Brayden Yager	Center	Canada	Moose Jaw Warriors	WHL	3	0	0	0	2						
2023	3	91	Emil Pieniniemi	Defense	Finland	Karpat	Liiga	—	—	—	—	—						
2023	5	142	Mikhail Ilyin	Right Wing	Russia	Almaz Cherepovets	MHL	—	—	—	—	—						
2023	6	174	Cooper Foster	Center	Canada	Ottawa 67's	OHL	—	—	—	—	—						
2023	7	217	Emil Järventie	Left Wing	Finland	SaiPa	Liiga	—	—	—	—	—						
2023	7	223	Kalle Kangas	Defense	Finland	Jokerit	Mestis	—	—	—	—	—						
2024	2	44	Harrison Brunicke	Defense	South Africa	Kamloops Blazers	WHL	9	1	0	1	6						
2024	2	46	Tanner Howe	Left Wing	Canada	Regina Pats	WHL	—	—	—	—	—						
2024	4	111	Chase Pietila	Defense	United States	Michigan Tech Huskies	CCHA	—	—	—	—	—						
2024	6	175	Joona Vaisanen	Defense	Finland	Dubuque Fighting Saints	USHL	—	—	—	—	—						
2024	7	207	Mac Swanson	Center	United States	Fargo Force	USHL	—	—	—	—	—						
2024	7	223	Finn Harding	Defense	Canada	Mississauga Steelheads	OHL	—	—	—	—	—						
2025	1	11	Benjamin Kindel	Center	Canada	Calgary Hitman	WHL	77	17	18	35	18						
2025	1	22	Bill Zonnon	Right Wing	Canada	Rouyn-Noranda Huskies	QMJHL	—	—	—	—	—						
2025	1	24	Will Horcoff	Center	United States	Michigan Wolverines	B1G	—	—	—	—	—						
2025	2	39	Peyton Kettles	Defense	Canada	Swift Current Broncos	WHL	—	—	—	—	—						
2025	3	73	Charlie Trethewey	Defense	United States	Boston Terriers	Hockey East	—	—	—	—	—						
2025	3	84	Gabriel D'Aigle	Goaltender	Canada	Victoriaville Tigres	QMJHL	—	—	—	—	—						
2025	3	91	Brady Peddle	Defense	Canada	Waterloo Black Hawks	USHL	—	—	—	—	—						
2025	4	105	Travis Hayes	Right Wing	United States	Soo Greyhounds	OHL	—	—	—	—	—						
2025	5	130	Ryan Miller	Center	Canada	Portland Winterhawks	WHL	—	—	—	—	—						
2025	5	148	Quinn Beauchesne	Defense	Canada	Guelph Storm	OHL	—	—	—	—	—						
2025	5	154	Jordan Charron	Right Wing	Canada	Soo Greyhounds	OHL	—	—	—	—	—						
2025	6	169	Carter Sanderson	Center	United States	Muskegon Lumberjacks	USHL	—	—	—	—	—						
2025	7	201	Kale Dach	Center	Canada	Calgary Hitman	WHL	—	—	—	—	—						
2026	1	22	Liam Ruck	Right Wing	Canada	Medicine Hat Tigers	WHL	—	—	—	—	—						
2026	2	39	Markus Ruck	Centre	Canada	Medicine Hat Tigers	WHL	—	—	—	—	—						
2026	2	54	Tomas Galvas	Defenceman	Czech Republic	HC Bílí Tygři Liberec	Czech Extraliga	—	—	—	—	—						
2026	3	86	Pierce Mbuyi	Left Wing	Canada	Owen Sound Attack	OHL	—	—	—	—	—						
2026	4	111	Parker Von Richter	Defenceman	Canada	Barrie Colts	OHL	—	—	—	—	—						
2026	5	160	Matvei Nikonovich	Goaltender	Belarus	HC Lada Togliatti	MHL	—	—	—	—	—						

¿ Played in the WHA.

== Draftees by nationality ==
Country	Selections	Percent	Last selection
North America	389	81.8%	
Canada	283	58.8%	Parker Von Richter (2026)
United States	108	23.1%	Mac Swanson (2024)
Europe	85	17.7%	
Finland	20	3.6%	Kalle Kangas (2023)
Russia	1a	3.6%	Mikhail Ilyin (2023)
Sweden	15	3.2%	Calle Clang (2020)
Czech Republic	15	3%	Tomas Galvas (2026)
Czechoslovakia	5	1.1%	Jan Alinc (1992)
Slovakia	5	1.1%	Michal Sersen (2004)
Germany	3	0.6%	Frederik Tiffels (2015)
Latvia	2	0.4%	Raivis Ansons (2020)
Belarus	2	0.2%	Matvei Nikonovich (2026)
Netherlands	1	0.2%	Daniel Sprong (2015)
Slovenia	1	0.2%	Jan Drozg (2017)
Switzerland	1	0.2%	Patrick Bärtschi (2002)
Ukraine	1	0.2%	Borys Protsenko (1996)
Asia	2	0.4%	
South Korea	2	0.4%	Richard Park (1994)

== Notes ==
- ^{a} The Penguins first-round pick in 1969 was traded to the Boston Bruins.
- ^{b} The Penguins first-round pick in 1971 was traded to the St. Louis Blues.
- ^{c} The Penguins first-round pick in 1972 was traded to the Minnesota North Stars.
- ^{d} The Penguins first-round pick in 1977 was traded to the Toronto Maple Leafs.
- ^{e} The Penguins first-round pick in 1978 was traded to the Philadelphia Flyers.
- ^{f} The Penguins first-round pick in 1979 was traded to the Washington Capitals.
- ^{g} The Penguins first-round pick in 1981 was traded to the Montreal Canadiens.
- ^{h} The Penguins obtained the 9th overall pick in 1984 from the Winnipeg Jets.
- ^{i} The Penguins obtained the 16th overall pick in 1984 from the Philadelphia Flyers.
- ^{j} The Penguins obtained the 1st overall pick in 2003 from the Florida Panthers.
- ^{k} The Penguins first-round pick in 2008 was traded to the Atlanta Thrashers.
- ^{l} The Penguins obtained the 8th overall pick in 2012 from the Carolina Hurricanes.
- ^{m} The Penguins first-round pick in 2013 was traded to the Calgary Flames.
- ^{n} The Penguins first-round pick in 2015 was traded to the Edmonton Oilers.
- ^{o} The Penguins first-round pick in 2016 was traded to the Toronto Maple Leafs.
- ^{p} The Penguins first-round pick in 2017 was traded to the St. Louis Blues.
- ^{q} The Penguins first-round pick in 2018 was traded to the Ottawa Senators.
