= Garry Swain =

Canadian ice hockey player

- Born: September 11, 1947 (age 78) Welland, Ontario, Canada
- Height: 5 ft 8 in (173 cm)
- Weight: 164 lb (74 kg; 11 st 10 lb)
- Position: Centre
- Shot: Left
- Played for: Pittsburgh Penguins; New England Whalers
- NHL draft: 4th overall, 1968; Pittsburgh Penguins
- Playing career: 1966–1977

Garth Frederick Arthur "Garry" Swain (born September 11, 1947) is a Canadian retired professional ice hockey center. He played 9 games in the National Hockey League with the Pittsburgh Penguins during the 1968–69 season and 171 games in the World Hockey Association with the New England Whalers from 1974 to 1977. Born in Welland, Ontario, Swain was drafted fourth overall in the 1968 NHL Amateur Draft by the Pittsburgh Penguins.

== Career statistics ==
=== Regular season and playoffs ===
			Regular season					Playoffs
Season	Team	League	GP	G	A	Pts	PIM	GP	G	A	Pts	PIM
1966–67	Niagara Falls Flyers	OHA	48	10	19	29	51	13	3	6	9	2
1967–68	Niagara Falls Flyers	OHA	54	41	62	103	79	19	9	16	25	35
1967–68	Niagara Falls Flyers	M-Cup	—	—	—	—	—	10	9	5	14	10
1968–69	Pittsburgh Penguins	NHL	9	1	1	2	0	—	—	—	—	—
1968–69	Amarillo Wranglers	CHL	69	20	27	47	51	—	—	—	—	—
1969–70	Baltimore Clippers	AHL	72	4	9	13	26	5	0	0	0	2
1970–71	Amarillo Wranglers	CHL	71	17	31	48	87	—	—	—	—	—
1971–72	Fort Wayne Komets	IHL	60	26	26	52	60	8	0	4	4	16
1972–73	Baltimore Clippers	AHL	76	14	24	38	69	—	—	—	—	—
1973–74	Baltimore Clippers	AHL	12	2	7	9	10	9	5	4	9	18
1973–74	Charlotte Checkers	SHL	68	34	64	98	84	—	—	—	—	—
1974–75	New England Whalers	WHA	66	7	15	22	18	6	0	3	3	41
1975–76	New England Whalers	WHA	79	10	16	26	46	17	3	2	5	15
1976–77	New England Whalers	WHA	26	5	2	7	6	2	0	0	0	0
1976–77	Rhode Island Reds	AHL	17	1	6	7	19	—	—	—	—	—
WHA totals			171	22	33	55	70	25	3	5	8	56
NHL totals			9	1	1	2	0	—	—	—	—	—

Preceded by Steve Rexe	Pittsburgh Penguins first-round draft pick 1968	Succeeded by Greg Polis
