= Sheldon Kannegiesser =

Canadian ice hockey player

- Born: August 15, 1947 (age 78) North Bay, Ontario, Canada
- Height: 6 ft 0 in (183 cm)
- Weight: 198 lb (90 kg; 14 st 2 lb)
- Position: Defence
- Shot: Left
- Played for: Pittsburgh Penguins; New York Rangers; Los Angeles Kings; Vancouver Canucks
- Playing career: 1965–1978

Sheldon Bruce Kannegiesser (born August 15, 1947) is a Canadian former professional ice hockey player who played 366 games in the National Hockey League. He played for the Pittsburgh Penguins, New York Rangers, Los Angeles Kings, and Vancouver Canucks. Kannegiesser retired from hockey in 1978 and lives in North Bay. He published an autobiography written entirely in poetry, called "Warriors of Winter: Rhymes of a Blueliner Balladeer." His brother was Gordon Kannegiesser.

== Career statistics ==
			Regular Season					Playoffs
Season	Team	League	GP	G	A	Pts	PIM	GP	G	A	Pts	PIM
1965–66	Kitchener Rangers	OHA	45	1	8	9	48	—	—	—	—	—
1966–67	Kitchener Rangers	OHA	48	7	16	23	81	—	—	—	—	—
1967–68	Omaha Knights	CPHL	20	1	2	3	11	—	—	—	—	—
1967–68	Buffalo Bisons	AHL	47	4	2	6	20	5	0	0	0	0
1968–69	Omaha Knights	CHL	70	8	13	21	104	7	1	1	2	6
1969–70	Buffalo Bisons	AHL	17	1	2	3	14	—	—	—	—	—
1969–70	Kansas City Blues	CHL	36	0	7	7	44	—	—	—	—	—
1970–71	Pittsburgh Penguins	NHL	18	0	2	2	29	—	—	—	—	—
1970–71	Omaha Knights	CHL	46	4	10	14	75	—	—	—	—	—
1970–71	Amarillo Wranglers	CHL	7	2	2	4	4	—	—	—	—	—
1971–72	Pittsburgh Penguins	NHL	54	2	4	6	47	—	—	—	—	—
1972–73	Hershey Bears	AHL	36	3	12	15	31	2	0	1	1	2
1972–73	Pittsburgh Penguins	NHL	3	0	0	0	0	—	—	—	—	—
1972–73	New York Rangers	NHL	3	0	1	1	4	1	0	0	0	2
1973–74	New York Rangers	NHL	12	1	3	4	6	—	—	—	—	—
1973–74	Los Angeles Kings	NHL	51	3	17	20	49	5	0	1	1	0
1974–75	Los Angeles Kings	NHL	74	2	23	25	57	3	0	1	1	4
1975–76	Los Angeles Kings	NHL	70	4	9	13	36	9	0	0	0	4
1976–77	Los Angeles Kings	NHL	39	1	1	2	28	—	—	—	—	—
1976–77	Fort Worth Texans	CHL	24	1	7	8	16	—	—	—	—	—
1977–78	Springfield Indians	AHL	14	2	8	10	19	—	—	—	—	—
1977–78	Vancouver Canucks	NHL	42	1	7	8	36	—	—	—	—	—
NHL totals			366	14	67	81	292	18	0	2	2	10
