= Ron Snell =

Canadian ice hockey player

- Born: August 11, 1948 (age 76); Regina, Saskatchewan, Canada
- Height: 5 ft 10 in (178 cm)
- Weight: 158 lb (72 kg; 11 st 4 lb)
- Position: Right wing
- Shot: Right
- Played for: Pittsburgh Penguins; Winnipeg Jets
- NHL draft: 14th overall, 1968; Pittsburgh Penguins
- Playing career: 1968–1976

Ronald Wayne Snell (born August 11, 1948) is a Canadian retired ice hockey player. He was drafted by the Pittsburgh Penguins in the second round, fourteenth overall, in the 1968 NHL Amateur Draft. He played seven games in the National Hockey League, all for the Pittsburgh Penguins, during the 1968–69 and 1969–70 seasons. He then moved to the World Hockey Association, playing two seasons for the Winnipeg Jets in 1973–74 and 1974–75 seasons. In 90 games in the WHA Snell had 24 goals and 25 assists, along with 40 penalty minutes.

== Career statistics ==
=== Regular season and playoffs ===
			Regular season					Playoffs
Season	Team	League	GP	G	A	Pts	PIM	GP	G	A	Pts	PIM
1966–67	Regina Pats	CMJHL	56	24	29	53	43	16	11	6	17	4
1967–68	Regina Pats	WCHL	60	56	55	111	86	4	3	4	7	0
1968–69	Pittsburgh Penguins	NHL	4	3	1	4	6	—	—	—	—	—
1968–69	Amarillo Wranglers	CHL	69	24	19	45	43	—	—	—	—	—
1969–70	Pittsburgh Penguins	NHL	3	0	1	1	0	—	—	—	—	—
1969–70	Baltimore Clippers	AHL	68	24	29	53	40	5	0	0	0	2
1970–71	Amarillo Wranglers	CHL	72	25	22	47	69	—	—	—	—	—
1971–72	Hershey Bears	AHL	76	22	31	53	29	4	0	1	1	12
1972–73	Hershey Bears	AHL	75	33	38	71	90	7	1	5	6	4
1973–74	Winnipeg Jets	WHA	70	24	25	49	32	4	0	0	0	0
1974–75	Winnipeg Jets	WHA	20	0	0	0	0	—	—	—	—	—
1974–75	Cape Codders	NAHL	25	17	12	29	49	4	1	3	4	2
1975–76	Cape Codders	NAHL	33	26	26	52	24	—	—	—	—	—
1975–76	Buffalo Norsemen	NAHL	3	1	2	3	2	—	—	—	—	—
1975–76	Rochester Americans	AHL	37	10	12	22	13	2	0	0	0	0
WHA totals			90	24	25	49	40	4	0	0	0	0
NHL totals			7	3	2	5	6	—	—	—	—	—
