= Greg Polis =

Canadian ice hockey player (1950–2018)

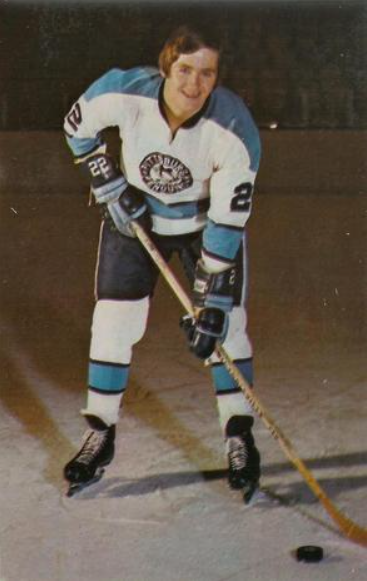
- Born: August 8, 1950 Westlock, Alberta, Canada
- Died: March 18, 2018 (aged 67) Courtenay, British Columbia
- Height: 6 ft 0 in (183 cm)
- Weight: 195 lb (88 kg; 13 st 13 lb)
- Position: Left wing
- Shot: Left
- Played for: Pittsburgh Penguins; St. Louis Blues; New York Rangers; Washington Capitals
- NHL draft: 7th overall, 1970; Pittsburgh Penguins
- Playing career: 1970–1980

Gregory Linn Polis (August 8, 1950 – March 18, 2018) was a Canadian professional ice hockey player. Polis played in the National Hockey League (NHL) for the Pittsburgh Penguins, St. Louis Blues, New York Rangers and Washington Capitals.

== Early life ==
Born in Westlock, Alberta, Polis grew up in Dapp, a nearby prairie town with a population of 75. With few other children in town, he would bring his pet Labrador Retriever to chase down and retrieve the puck. Statements such as "Greg's dog used to chase pucks for him in his childhood" - with associated cartoon - were an annual highlight of his Topps and O-Pee-Chee hockey cards in the early 1970s, the repetition of which became a source of amusement to hockey card collectors over the years.

== Career ==
Polis played for the Estevan Bruins in the Canadian Major Junior Hockey League and Western Canada Hockey League (precursors of the Western Hockey League) for four seasons, and was regarded as one of the best players to come out of that junior level organization. He was named as a league all star at left wing three times, and finished second in scoring in the league twice.

After advancing through the junior levels, Polis was selected by the Pittsburgh Penguins as their first choice in the 1970 NHL Amateur Draft (seventh overall). He played in the All-Star Game during his first three years with the Penguins. He played with three other teams during an injury-plagued career. Polis served his last pro season with the Washington Capitals in 1979–80.

== Death ==
Polis died of cancer in Courtenay, British Columbia on March 18, 2018.

== Awards and achievements ==
- WCHL All-Star Team (1969, 1970)
- All-Star Game: 1971, 1972, 1973
- All-Star Game Most Valuable Player: 1973
- Pittsburgh Briere Award (Rookie of Year): 1970–71

== Career statistics ==
			Regular season					Playoffs
Season	Team	League	GP	G	A	Pts	PIM	GP	G	A	Pts	PIM
1966–67	Estevan Bruins	CMJHL	54	12	30	42	83	13	1	5	6	12
1967–68	Estevan Bruins	WCHL	59	35	32	67	124	13	3	6	9	20
1967–68	Estevan Bruins	MC	—	—	—	—	—	12	1	4	5	8
1968–69	Estevan Bruins	WCHL	60	40	85	125	94	12	4	6	10	8
1969–70	Estevan Bruins	WCHL	60	48	56	104	69	5	2	1	3	2
1970–71	Pittsburgh Penguins	NHL	61	18	15	33	40	—	—	—	—	—
1971–72	Pittsburgh Penguins	NHL	76	30	19	49	38	4	0	2	2	0
1972–73	Pittsburgh Penguins	NHL	78	26	23	49	36	—	—	—	—	—
1973–74	Pittsburgh Penguins	NHL	41	14	13	27	32	—	—	—	—	—
1973–74	St. Louis Blues	NHL	37	8	12	20	24	—	—	—	—	—
1974–75	New York Rangers	NHL	76	26	15	41	55	3	0	0	0	6
1975–76	New York Rangers	NHL	79	15	21	36	77	—	—	—	—	—
1976–77	New York Rangers	NHL	77	16	23	39	44	—	—	—	—	—
1977–78	New York Rangers	NHL	37	7	16	23	12	—	—	—	—	—
1978–79	New York Rangers	NHL	6	1	1	2	8	—	—	—	—	—
1978–79	New Haven Nighthawks	AHL	10	3	3	6	0	—	—	—	—	—
1978–79	Washington Capitals	NHL	19	12	6	18	6	—	—	—	—	—
1979–80	Washington Capitals	NHL	28	1	5	6	19	—	—	—	—	—
1979–80	Hershey Bears	AHL	9	0	2	2	2	—	—	—	—	—
1980–81	Hershey Bears	AHL	2	1	0	1	5	—	—	—	—	—
NHL totals			615	174	169	343	391	7	0	2	2	6

Preceded by Garry Swain	Pittsburgh Penguins first-round draft pick 1970	Succeeded by Blaine Stoughton
