= Rick Kessell =

Canadian ice hockey player (1949–2026)

- Born: July 27, 1949 Toronto, Ontario, Canada
- Died: November 6, 2026 (aged 77)
- Height: 5 ft 10 in (178 cm)
- Weight: 175 lb (79 kg; 12 st 7 lb)
- Position: Centre
- Shot: Left
- Played for: Pittsburgh Penguins; California Golden Seals
- NHL draft: 13th overall, 1969; Pittsburgh Penguins
- Playing career: 1969–1977

Richard John Kessell (July 27, 1949 – November 6, 2026) was a Canadian professional ice hockey centre who played in the NHL for the Pittsburgh Penguins and California Golden Seals.

== Career ==
Drafted 15th overall by the Penguins in the 1969 NHL Amateur Draft, Kessell played 135 regular season games, scoring 4 goals and 24 assists for 28 career points. One of his only 4 goals would come on March 21, 1970 during his first NHL game. Despite his brief NHL career Kessell excelled in juniors, the minors and senior hockey. As a youth, he played in the 1961 Quebec International Pee-Wee Hockey Tournament with the Scarboro Lions.

== Death ==
Kessell died on November 6, 2026, at the age of 77.

== Career statistics ==
=== Regular season and playoffs ===
			Regular season					Playoffs
Season	Team	League	GP	G	A	Pts	PIM	GP	G	A	Pts	PIM
1965–66	Toronto Marlboros	OHA	—	—	—	—	—	2	0	0	0	0
1966–67	Markham Waxers	MTJHL	35	29	27	56	—	—	—	—	—	—
1967–68	Markham Waxers	MTJHL	—	—	—	—	—	—	—	—	—	—
1967–68	Toronto Marlboros	OHA	14	1	3	4	2	—	—	—	—	—
1967–68	London Nationals	WOHL	16	2	2	4	0	—	—	—	—	—
1968–69	Oshawa Generals	OHA	53	26	66	92	8	—	—	—	—	—
1969–70	Baltimore Clippers	AHL	52	15	21	36	6	5	1	1	2	0
1969–70	Pittsburgh Penguins	NHL	8	1	2	3	2	—	—	—	—	—
1970–71	Pittsburgh Penguins	NHL	6	0	2	2	2	—	—	—	—	—
1970–71	Amarillo Wranglers	CHL	62	31	38	69	10	—	—	—	—	—
1971–72	Hershey Bears	AHL	54	24	19	43	12	—	—	—	—	—
1971–72	Pittsburgh Penguins	NHL	3	0	1	1	0	—	—	—	—	—
1972–73	Pittsburgh Penguins	NHL	67	1	13	14	0	—	—	—	—	—
1973–74	California Golden Seals	NHL	51	2	6	8	4	—	—	—	—	—
1974–75	New Haven Nighthawks	AHL	60	21	46	67	16	16	4	9	13	2
1974–75	Salt Lake Golden Eagles	CHL	8	1	4	5	2	—	—	—	—	—
1975–76	Salt Lake Golden Eagles	CHL	54	16	39	55	19	5	2	3	5	2
1976–77	Whitby Warriors	OHA Sr	14	9	17	26	6	—	—	—	—	—
AHL totals			166	60	86	146	34	21	5	10	15	2
NHL totals			134	4	24	28	8	—	—	—	—	—
