= Steve Cardwell =

Canadian ice hockey player (born 1950)

- Born: August 18, 1950 (age 75) Toronto, Ontario, Canada
- Height: 5 ft 11 in (180 cm)
- Weight: 190 lb (86 kg; 13 st 8 lb)
- Position: Left wing
- Shot: Left
- Played for: Pittsburgh Penguins
- NHL draft: 63rd overall, 1970; Pittsburgh Penguins
- Playing career: 1968–1977

Stephen Michael Cardwell (born August 18, 1950) is a Canadian retired professional ice hockey forward who played 53 games in the National Hockey League for the Pittsburgh Penguins. He also played 152 games in the World Hockey Association with the Minnesota Fighting Saints and Cleveland Crusaders.

Cardwell was born in Toronto, Ontario, and played his junior ice hockey in Oshawa for the Oshawa Generals.

== Career statistics ==
			Regular Season					Playoffs
Season	Team	League	GP	G	A	Pts	PIM	GP	G	A	Pts	PIM
1968–69	Oshawa Generals	OHA Jr	50	11	11	22	54	—	—	—	—	—
1969–70	Oshawa Generals	OHA Jr	46	14	19	33	77	6	4	2	6	6
1970–71	Pittsburgh Penguins	NHL	5	0	1	1	15	—	—	—	—	—
1970–71	Amarillo Wranglers	CHL	63	16	34	50	166	—	—	—	—	—
1971–72	Pittsburgh Penguins	NHL	28	7	8	15	18	4	0	0	0	2
1971–72	Hershey Bears	AHL	46	17	26	43	32	—	—	—	—	—
1972–73	Pittsburgh Penguins	NHL	20	2	2	4	2	—	—	—	—	—
1972–73	Hershey Bears	AHL	30	16	23	39	20	7	5	2	7	22
1973–74	Minnesota Fighting Saints	WHA	77	23	23	46	100	10	0	0	0	20
1974–75	Cleveland Crusaders	WHA	75	9	13	22	127	5	0	1	1	14
1975–76	Hershey Bears	AHL	72	22	33	55	165	9	0	2	2	11
1976–77	Djurgardens IF	Sweden-2	19	6	2	8	60	—	—	—	—	—
NHL totals			53	9	11	20	35	4	0	0	0	2
