= Amarillo Wranglers (1968–1971) =

- City: Amarillo, Texas
- League: Central Hockey League
- Operated: 1968–1969, 1970–1971
- Home arena: Amarillo Civic Center
- Colors: Columbia Blue, Navy Blue and White
- Owner: Jack McGregor
- General manager: Jack Button
- Head coach: Rudy Migay
- Affiliates: Pittsburgh Penguins

The Amarillo Wranglers served as a farm team to the Pittsburgh Penguins of the National Hockey League. Based in Amarillo, Texas, the Wranglers were members of the Central Hockey League (CHL).

The franchise was founded by Jack McGregor, who was also founder of the Penguins. McGregor served as the Wranglers' team president. McGregor and the Penguins tried twice to bring hockey to Amarillo, both times found it too costly, due to poor attendance.

The Wranglers participated in the 1968-69 season, then suspended operations. They then returned to the CHL for the 1970-71 season, but permanently ceased operations after that season.

== Season-by-season record ==
Note: GP = Games played, W = Wins, L = Losses, T = Ties, Pts = Points, GF = Goals for, GA = Goals against, PIM = Penalties in minutes

Central Hockey League

| Season | GP | W | L | T | Pts | GF | GA | PIM | Finish | Playoffs |
|---|---|---|---|---|---|---|---|---|---|---|
| 1968–69 | 72 | 29 | 32 | 11 | 69 | 238 | 252 | 1209 | 4th | Out of playoffs |
| 1970–71 | 72 | 14 | 47 | 11 | 39 | 216 | 329 | 1219 | 7th | Out of playoffs |

== Amarillo Wranglers all-time roster ==
| Name | Position | Years played |
|---|---|---|
| Norman Andrighetti | Center | 1968–69 |
| Paul Andrea | Right Wing | 1968–69 |
| Terry Ball | Defense | 1970–71 |
| Jim Bannatyne | Forward | 1968-69 |
| Doug Barrie | Defense | 1968–69 |
| Larry Bignell | Defense | 1970–71 |
| Larry Billows | Left Wing | 1968–69,1970–71 |
| Bob Birdsill | Right Wing | 1970–71 |
| Buddy Blom | Goaltender | 1968–69 |
| Dale Blomquist | Left Wing | 1968–69 |
| Jim Boyd | Center | 1970–71 |
| Robin Burns | Left Wing | 1970–71 |
| Steve Cardwell | Left Wing | 1970–71 |
| Dwight Carruthers | Defense | 1968–69 |
| Al Cecile | Goaltender | 1970–71 |
| Len Cunning | | 1970–71 |
| Norm Descoteux | Defense | 1968–69 |
| Marv Edwards | Goaltender | 1968–69 |
| Bob Fitchner | Left Wing | 1970–71 |
| Conley Forey | Left Wing | 1970–71 |
| André Gaudette | Center | 1968–69 |
| Bob Heaney | Defense | 1970–71 |
| Paul Hoganson | Goaltender | 1970–71 |
| Michel Jacques | Forward | 1968–69 |
| Lou Jankowski | Left Wing | 1968–69 |
| Al Johnstone | Goaltender | 1970–71 |
| Sheldon Kannegiesser | Defense | 1970–71 |

| Name | Position | Years played |
|---|---|---|
| Rick Kessell | Center | 1970–71 |
| Yvon Labre | Defense | 1970–71 |
| Jean-Guy Lagace | Defense | 1968–69,1970–71 |
| Ted Lanyon | Defense | 1968–69 |
| Bill LeCaine | Left Wing | 1968–69 |
| Paul Lessard | Forward | 1968–69 |
| Clare Lomheim | Right Wing | 1970–71 |
| Dick Mattiussi | Defense | 1968–69 |
| Elgin McCann | Forward | 1968–69 |
| Cam Newton | Goaltender | 1970–71 |
| Rusty Patenaude | Right Wing | 1970–71 |
| Jim Pearson | Defense | 1970–71 |
| Nick Polano | Defense | 1968–69 |
| Jim Pritchard | Defense | 1970–71 |
| Ron Racette | | 1968–69 |
| Marty Reynolds | Forward | 1968–69 |
| Danny Sharpe | Defense | 1968–69 |
| Jim Shires | Left Wing | 1968–69 |
| Dave Simpson | Defense | 1968-69 |
| Jim Pearson | Defense | 1968–69,1970–71 |
| Bob Smith | Forward | 1968–69 |
| Ron Snell | Right Wing | 1968–69,1970–71 |
| Bill Speer | Defense | 1968–69 |
| John Stewart | Left Wing | 1970–71 |
| Garry Swain | Center | 1968–69,1970–71 |
| Bob Toothill | | 1970–71 |
| Rod Zaine | Center | 1970–71 |

Trainer - Jim McKenzie
