= Larry Bignell =

Canadian ice hockey player (born 1950)

- Born: January 7, 1950 (age 76) Edmonton, Alberta, Canada
- Height: 5 ft 11 in (180 cm)
- Weight: 175 lb (79 kg; 12 st 7 lb)
- Position: Defence
- Shot: Left
- Played for: Pittsburgh Penguins; Ottawa Civics; Denver Spurs
- NHL draft: 35th overall, 1970; Pittsburgh Penguins
- Playing career: 1970–1977

Larry Irvin Bignell (born January 7, 1950) is a Canadian retired professional Ice hockey defenceman from Edmonton, Alberta.

== Career ==
Bignell was selected by the Pittsburgh Penguins in the second round, 35th overall, in the 1970 NHL Amateur Draft. He appeared in 20 NHL games for the Penguins in 1973–74, scoring three assists, and three games in the 1975 Stanley Cup Playoffs. Bignell also played 41 games in the World Hockey Association for the Denver Spurs/Ottawa Civics in 1975–76. The majority of his professional career was spent in the American Hockey League. He retired in 1977.

== Career statistics ==
=== Regular season and playoffs ===
			Regular season					Playoffs
Season	Team	League	GP	G	A	Pts	PIM	GP	G	A	Pts	PIM
1968–69	Edmonton Movers	AJHL	—	—	—	—	—	—	—	—	—	—
1968–69	Lethbridge Sugar Kings	M-Cup	—	—	—	—	—	6	0	2	2	6
1969–70	Edmonton Oil Kings	WCHL	58	5	22	27	91	18	4	3	7	37
1970–71	Amarillo Wranglers	CHL	63	3	16	19	64	—	—	—	—	—
1971–72	Hershey Bears	AHL	58	4	10	14	59	3	0	0	0	4
1972–73	Hershey Bears	AHL	54	6	15	21	94	7	1	1	2	16
1973–74	Hershey Bears	AHL	17	2	2	4	40	—	—	—	—	—
1973–74	Richmond Robins	AHL	35	7	10	17	103	5	4	3	7	6
1973–74	Pittsburgh Penguins	NHL	20	0	3	3	2	—	—	—	—	—
1974–75	Baltimore Clippers	AHL	44	8	18	26	139	—	—	—	—	—
1974–75	Hershey Bears	AHL	30	0	8	8	67	8	2	5	7	27
1974–75	Pittsburgh Penguins	NHL	—	—	—	—	—	3	0	0	0	2
1975–76	Hershey Bears	AHL	11	1	9	10	2	10	0	1	1	29
1975–76	Denver Spurs/Ottawa Civics	WHA	41	5	5	10	43	—	—	—	—	—
1976–77	Hershey Bears	AHL	72	7	19	26	135	6	0	1	1	11
WHA totals			41	5	5	10	43	—	—	—	—	—
NHL totals			20	0	3	3	2	3	0	0	0	2
