= Connie Forey =

Canadian ice hockey player

- Born: October 18, 1950 (age 74); Montreal, Quebec, Canada
- Height: 6 ft 2 in (188 cm)
- Weight: 185 lb (84 kg; 13 st 3 lb)
- Position: Left wing
- Shot: Left
- Played for: St. Louis Blues
- NHL draft: 49th overall, 1970; Pittsburgh Penguins
- Playing career: 1970–1974

Conley Michael "Connie" Forey (born October 18, 1950) is a Canadian retired professional ice hockey left wing. He played four games in the National Hockey League with the St. Louis Blues during the 1973–74 NHL season and one game in the World Hockey Association with the Chicago Cougars during the 1973–74 WHA season. The rest of his career, which lasted from 1970 to 1975, was spent in the minor leagues. He was drafted in the fourth round of the 1970 NHL Amateur Draft.

== Career statistics ==
=== Regular season and playoffs ===
			Regular season					Playoffs
Season	Team	League	GP	G	A	Pts	PIM	GP	G	A	Pts	PIM
1968–69	Ottawa 67's	OHA	53	9	10	19	22	7	2	1	3	6
1969–70	Ottawa 67's	OHA	54	24	28	52	39	—	—	—	—	—
1970–71	Amarillo Wranglers	CHL	67	17	22	39	55	—	—	—	—	—
1971–72	Hershey Bears	AHL	39	11	5	16	20	4	0	0	0	0
1971–72	Fort Wayne Komets	IHL	2	0	0	0	0	—	—	—	—	—
1972–73	New Haven Nighthawks	AHL	71	21	18	39	40	—	—	—	—	—
1973–74	St. Louis Blues	NHL	4	0	0	0	4	—	—	—	—	—
1973–74	Denver Spurs	WHL	49	14	12	26	57	—	—	—	—	—
1973–74	Chicago Cougars	WHA	1	0	0	0	0	—	—	—	—	—
1974–75	Mohawk Valley Comets	NAHL	6	1	1	2	10	—	—	—	—	—
WHA totals			1	0	0	0	0	—	—	—	—	—
NHL totals			4	0	0	0	2	—	—	—	—	—
