= Bob Fitchner =

Canadian ice hockey player

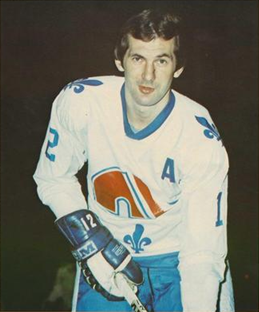
- Born: December 22, 1950 (age 75) Sudbury, Ontario, Canada
- Height: 6 ft 1 in (185 cm)
- Weight: 185 lb (84 kg; 13 st 3 lb)
- Position: Centre
- Shot: Left
- Played for: Edmonton Oilers; Indianapolis Racers; Quebec Nordiques
- NHL draft: 77th overall, 1970; Pittsburgh Penguins
- Playing career: 1970–1981

Robert Douglas Fitchner (born December 22, 1950) is a Canadian former professional ice hockey player who played 414 games in the World Hockey Association (WHA), with the Edmonton Oilers, Indianapolis Racers and Quebec Nordiques between 1973 and 1979. When the WHA merged with the National Hockey League (NHL) for the 1979–80 NHL season, Fitchner played 78 NHL games with the Nordiques between 1979 and 1981.

== Career statistics ==
=== Regular season and playoffs ===
			Regular season					Playoffs
Season	Team	League	GP	G	A	Pts	PIM	GP	G	A	Pts	PIM
1968–69	Brandon Wheat Kings	WCHL	60	21	24	45	83	—	—	—	—	—
1969–70	Brandon Wheat Kings	WCHL	60	20	44	64	119	—	—	—	—	—
1970–71	Amarillo Wranglers	CHL	70	9	10	19	49	—	—	—	—	—
1971–72	Hershey Bears	AHL	3	0	0	0	0	—	—	—	—	—
1971–72	Fort Wayne Komets	IHL	52	11	17	28	106	8	0	4	4	31
1972–73	Fort Wayne Komets	IHL	73	26	37	63	157	9	4	10	14	22
1973–74	Edmonton Oilers	WHA	31	1	2	3	21	—	—	—	—	—
1973–74	Winston-Salem Polar Twins	SHL	31	16	16	32	107	7	3	5	8	6
1974–75	Indianapolis Racers	WHA	78	11	19	30	96	—	—	—	—	—
1975–76	Indianapolis Racers	WHA	52	15	16	31	112	—	—	—	—	—
1975–76	Quebec Nordiques	WHA	21	7	9	16	22	5	1	0	1	8
1976–77	Quebec Nordiques	WHA	81	9	30	39	105	17	3	3	6	16
1977–78	Quebec Nordiques	WHA	72	15	28	43	76	11	1	6	7	10
1978–79	Quebec Nordiques	WHA	79	10	35	45	69	4	1	3	4	0
1979–80	Quebec Nordiques	NHL	70	11	20	31	59	—	—	—	—	—
1980–81	Quebec Nordiques	NHL	8	1	0	1	0	3	0	0	0	10
1980–81	Rochester Americans	AHL	34	5	10	15	60	—	—	—	—	—
WHA totals			414	68	139	209	501	37	6	12	18	34
NHL totals			78	12	20	32	59	3	0	0	0	10
