= Dick Mattiussi =

Canadian ice hockey player

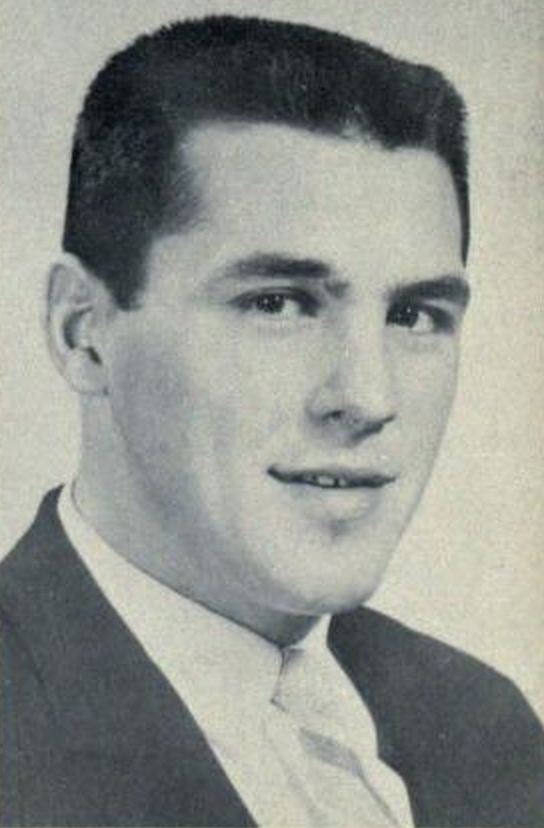
- Mattiussi c. 1958 at St. Michaels College
- Born: May 1, 1938 (age 87) Smooth Rock Falls, Ontario, Canada
- Height: 5 ft 10 in (178 cm)
- Weight: 185 lb (84 kg; 13 st 3 lb)
- Position: Defence/Left Wing
- Shot: Left
- Played for: Pittsburgh Penguins; California Golden Seals
- Playing career: 1959–1975

Richard Arthur Mattiussi (born May 1, 1938) is a Canadian former professional ice hockey defenceman who played in the National Hockey League.

== Playing career ==
Mattiussi played 200 games for the Pittsburgh Penguins and Oakland/California Seals in the 1960s and 70s. He was known as a hard-nosed grinder in the corners and spent much of his career in the AHL. Following 200 NHL games Mattiussi had recorded 8 goals and 31 assists for 39 points. Upon retirement he went on to coach the Rochester Americans of the AHL in the 1975 and 1976 seasons.

== Career statistics ==
=== Regular season and playoffs ===
			Regular season					Playoffs
Season	Team	League	GP	G	A	Pts	PIM	GP	G	A	Pts	PIM
1955–56	Toronto St. Michael's Majors	OHA	48	10	7	17	0	—	—	—	—	—
1956–57	Toronto St. Michael's Majors	OHA	52	12	18	30	0	—	—	—	—	—
1957–58	Toronto St. Michael's Majors	OHA	51	9	15	24	0	—	—	—	—	—
1958–59	Kitchener-Waterloo Dutchmen	OHA Sr	51	6	21	27	89	—	—	—	—	—
1959–60	Rochester Americans	AHL	72	2	20	22	76	12	0	0	0	14
1960–61	Rochester Americans	AHL	61	3	23	26	141	—	—	—	—	—
1961–62	Pittsburgh Hornets	AHL	65	9	19	28	164	—	—	—	—	—
1962–63	Cleveland Barons	AHL	70	6	28	34	124	4	2	2	4	6
1963–64	Cleveland Barons	AHL	72	6	17	23	110	9	1	5	6	20
1964–65	Cleveland Barons	AHL	67	8	18	26	98	—	—	—	—	—
1965–66	Cleveland Barons	AHL	72	8	35	43	138	12	0	5	5	10
1966–67	Cleveland Barons	AHL	71	10	44	54	78	5	1	2	3	2
1967–68	Baltimore Clippers	AHL	3	0	0	0	0	—	—	—	—	—
1967–68	Pittsburgh Penguins	NHL	32	0	2	2	18	—	—	—	—	—
1968–69	Pittsburgh Penguins	NHL	12	0	2	2	14	—	—	—	—	—
1968–69	Oakland Seals	NHL	24	1	9	10	16	7	0	1	1	6
1968–69	Amarillo Wranglers	CHL	8	0	2	2	8	—	—	—	—	—
1969–70	Oakland Seals	NHL	65	4	10	14	38	1	0	0	0	0
1970–71	California Golden Seals	NHL	67	3	8	11	38	—	—	—	—	—
1971–72	Baltimore Clippers	AHL	67	3	8	11	103	18	0	0	0	10
1972–73	Providence Reds	AHL	23	2	6	8	30	—	—	—	—	—
1973–74	Rochester Americans	AHL	76	12	26	38	84	5	0	2	2	8
1975–76	Rochester Americans	AHL	3	0	0	0	0	—	—	—	—	—
AHL totals			722	69	244	313	1126	65	4	16	20	70
NHL totals			200	8	31	39	124	8	0	1	1	6

== Coaching statistics ==
Team (League)	Year	Regular season						Postseason			
Team (League)	Year	G	W	L	T	Pts	Finish	G	W	L	Result
Rochester Americans (AHL)	1974–75	76	42	25	9	93	2nd North Division	12	6	6	Lost in Round 2
Rochester Americans (AHL)	1975–76	76	42	25	9	93	2nd North Division	7	3	4	Lost in Round 2

== Transactions ==
- June 7, 1962 – Traded to Springfield (AHL) by Toronto (Rochester-AHL) with Jim Wilcox, Bill White, Roger Cote, and the loan of Wally Boyer for Kent Douglas.
- October 16, 1962 – Traded to Cleveland (AHL) by Springfield (AHL) for Wayne Larkin and Murray Davison.
- August 11, 1966 – Traded to Pittsburgh by Cleveland (AHL) for cash.
- October 1966 – Loaned to Cleveland (AHL) by Pittsburgh for the 1966-67 season for cash.
- January 30, 1969 – Traded to Oakland by Pittsburgh with Earl Ingarfield and Gene Ubriaco for Bryan Watson, George Swarbrick, and Tracy Pratt.
- Selected by Dayton (Houston) in the WHA General Player Draft.
