= John Stewart (ice hockey, born 1950) =

Ice hockey player, born 1950

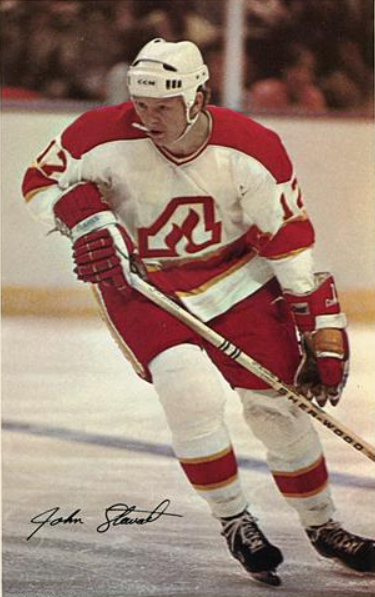
- Stewart in 1972 photo
- Born: October 30, 1950 (age 75) Eriksdale, Manitoba, Canada
- Height: 6 ft 0 in (183 cm)
- Weight: 180 lb (82 kg; 12 st 12 lb)
- Position: Left wing
- Shot: Left
- Played for: Pittsburgh Penguins; Atlanta Flames; California Golden Seals; Cleveland Crusaders; Birmingham Bulls; Minnesota Fighting Saints
- NHL draft: 21st overall, 1970; Pittsburgh Penguins
- Playing career: 1970–1978

John Alexander Stewart (born May 16, 1950) is a Canadian former professional ice hockey winger who played 257 games in the National Hockey League and 95 games in the World Hockey Association.

== Early life ==
Stewart was born in Eriksdale, Manitoba, and raised in Warren, Manitoba.

== Career ==
Stewart was selected by the Pittsburgh Penguins in the second round (21st overall) of the 1970 NHL Amateur Draft. During his career, he played with the Pittsburgh Penguins, Atlanta Flames, California Golden Seals, Cleveland Crusaders, Birmingham Bulls, and Minnesota Fighting Saints.

After retiring from hockey, John graduated from seminary in 1988 in Minneapolis, Minnesota. He served as a pastor for 18 years, planting two churches in Minnesota. He now serves as the executive director of Lamplighters International Inc., an evangelical Christian ministry he founded in 2000. He is the author of 28 books.

=== Regular season and playoffs ===
			Regular season					Playoffs
Season	Team	League	GP	G	A	Pts	PIM	GP	G	A	Pts	PIM
1967–68	Winnipeg Jets	WCHL	24	7	8	15	33	4	0	0	0	0
1968–69	Winnipeg Jets	WCHL	4	3	1	4	5	—	—	—	—	—
1968–69	Sorel Black Hawks	MMJHL	—	—	—	—	—	—	—	—	—	—
1968–69	Sorel Black Hawks	M-Cup	—	—	—	—	—	—	—	—	—	—
1969–70	Flin Flon Bombers	WCHL	25	10	13	23	71	17	10	16	26	28
1970–71	Pittsburgh Penguins	NHL	15	2	1	3	9	—	—	—	—	—
1970–71	Amarillo Wranglers	CHL	57	19	15	34	92	—	—	—	—	—
1971–72	Pittsburgh Penguins	NHL	25	2	8	10	23	—	—	—	—	—
1971–72	Hershey Bears	AHL	46	10	17	27	32	4	1	2	3	4
1972–73	Atlanta Flames	NHL	68	17	17	34	30	—	—	—	—	—
1972–73	Nova Scotia Voyageurs	AHL	5	3	3	6	7	—	—	—	—	—
1973–74	Atlanta Flames	NHL	74	18	15	33	41	4	0	0	0	10
1974–75	California Golden Seals	NHL	76	19	19	38	55	—	—	—	—	—
1975–76	Cleveland Crusaders	WHA	79	12	21	33	43	3	0	0	0	2
1976–77	Minnesota Fighting Saints	WHA	15	3	3	6	2	—	—	—	—	—
1976–77	Birmingham Bulls	WHA	1	0	0	0	0	—	—	—	—	—
1977–78	Philadelphia Firebirds	AHL	70	23	15	38	90	4	1	3	4	2
WHA totals			95	15	24	39	45	3	0	0	0	2
NHL totals			258	58	60	118	158	4	0	0	0	10
