= Bob Smith (ice hockey) =

Canadian ice hockey player (born 1946)

- Born: December 1, 1946 (age 78); Sault Ste. Marie, Ontario, Canada
- Height: 5 ft 11 in (180 cm)
- Weight: 175 lb (79 kg; 12 st 7 lb)
- Position: Centre
- Shot: Right
- Played for: Muskegon Mohawks (IHL); Amarillo Wranglers (CHL)
- NHL draft: 2nd Round (11th overall), 1967; Pittsburgh Penguins
- Playing career: 1967–1972

Robert (Bob) Smith (born December 1, 1946) is a Canadian retired professional ice hockey player. Smith was selected 11th overall in the 1967 NHL Amateur Draft by the Pittsburgh Penguins, but did not make it to the NHL, playing five seasons in the minor leagues.

Smith was born in Sault Ste. Marie, Ontario. Smith was an 18-year-old playing in the Northern Ontario Junior Hockey League with the Sault Ste. Marie Greyhounds when he was selected by the Pittsburgh Penguins with the 11th overall pick of the 1967 NHL Amateur draft. Although all 12 NHL teams were eligible, both the St. Louis Blues and Toronto Maple Leafs passed on their opportunity to select a player in the first round, allowing Pittsburgh to use their second pick to take Smith.

With the exception of playing three games in the CHL with the Amarillo Wranglers, Smith played his entire professional career (1967–72) in the IHL with the Muskegon Mohawks.

== Championships ==
Smith won the IHL Championship (Turner Cup) as a member of the 1967-68 Muskegon Mohawks. Smith was the team's top goal scorer in the playoffs with six goals in nine games.

== Career statistics ==
			Regular season					Playoffs
Season	Team	League	GP	G	A	Pts	PIM	GP	G	A	Pts	PIM
1964–65	Sault Ste. Marie Greyhounds	NOJHL	40	44	44	88	23	7	8	9	17	4
1965–66	Sault Ste. Marie Greyhounds	NOJHL	40	46	46	92	50	12	11	10	21	16
1966–67	Sault Ste. Marie Greyhounds	NOJHL	39	48	52	100	27	11	11	14	25	6
1966–67	Sault Ste. Marie Greyhounds	Mem. Cup	--	--	--	--	--	7	3	9	12	6
1967–68	Muskegon Mohawks	IHL	68	26	34	60	35	9	6	5	11	12
1968–69	Muskegon Mohawks	IHL	65	38	44	82	32	11	4	8	12	6
1968–69	Amarillo Wranglers	CHL	3	0	0	0	0	--	--	--	--	--
1969–70	Muskegon Mohawks	IHL	13	7	6	13	22	--	--	--	--	--
1970–71	Muskegon Mohawks	IHL	70	28	39	67	44	6	2	5	7	0
1971–72	Muskegon Mohawks	IHL	61	33	51	84	9	11	4	11	15	4
