= Artem Kopot =

Russian ice hockey player (1972-1992)

- Born: July 25, 1972 Chelyabinsk, Russian SFSR, Soviet Union
- Died: July 20, 1992 (aged 19) Chelyabinsk, Russia
- Height: 5 ft 10 in (178 cm)
- Weight: 178 lb (81 kg; 12 st 10 lb)
- Position: Defence
- Shot: Right
- Played for: Traktor Chelyabinsk
- NHL draft: 139th overall, 1992; Pittsburgh Penguins
- Playing career: 1991–1992

Artem Kopot (July 25, 1972 - July 20, 1992) was a Russian professional ice hockey defenseman who died a month after being drafted by the National Hockey League's Pittsburgh Penguins.

== Career ==
Kopot played 28 games for the Russian Superleague team Traktor Chelyabinsk. He did not score any goals or assists with the team, but he accumulated 16 penalty minutes. Shortly after, the Penguins drafted him in the sixth round (139th overall) in the 1992 NHL entry draft. Kopot was the first Russian to be drafted by the Penguins, and one of three Europeans to be drafted by the Penguins during the 1992 draft class.

== Death ==
On July 20, 1992, Kopot was involved in a fatal single car crash. Penguins spokesperson Harry Sanders learned that Kopot was driving alone at the time. He died five days shy of his 20th birthday.

== See also ==
- List of ice hockey players who died during their playing career
