= Jim Pearson (ice hockey) =

Canadian ice hockey defenceman

- Born: May 10, 1950 (age 74); Chatham, Ontario, Canada
- Height: 5 ft 11 in (180 cm)
- Weight: 185 lb (84 kg; 13 st 3 lb)
- Position: Defence
- Shot: Left
- Played for: Amarillo Wranglers; Fort Wayne Komets; Hershey Bears
- NHL draft: 90th overall, 1970; Pittsburgh Penguins
- Playing career: 1970–1974

Jim Pearson (born May 10, 1950) is a Canadian retired professional ice hockey defenceman. He was selected by the Pittsburgh Penguins in the seventh round (90th overall) of the 1970 NHL Amateur Draft.

== Career ==
Pearson spent four season in the minors, starting his career with the Amarillo Wranglers, the Penguins CHL minor league affiliate. The Wranglers folded after the completion of the 1970-71 season, and Pearson moved to the Fort Wayne Komets of the International Hockey League. Pearson led all Komets defenseman in goals (18) during the 1971-72 season. He followed that season by leading all Komets defensemen in goals (20) and points (57), and established a career high in assists (37) and penalty minutes (101) as the Komets would go on to win the Turner Cup, awarded to the team that wins the league championship.

Pearson joined the Hershey Bears in 1973-74, and led all Bears defensemen in goals (25) and points (61). The Bears would go on to win the Calder Cup, defeating the Providence Reds four games to one.
