= 1970–71 CHL season =

American ice hockey season

The 1970–71 CHL season was the eighth season of the Central Hockey League, a North American minor professional league. Seven teams participated in the regular season, and the Omaha Knights won the league title.

== Regular season ==
Central Hockey League	GP	W	L	OTL	GF	GA	Pts
Omaha Knights	72	45	16	11	312	216	101
Dallas Black Hawks	72	36	28	8	276	246	80
Fort Worth Wings	72	35	28	9	232	198	79
Oklahoma City Blazers	72	30	30	12	258	273	72
Kansas City Blues	72	30	31	11	214	223	71
Tulsa Oilers	72	27	37	8	252	275	62
Amarillo Wranglers	72	14	47	11	216	329	39

== Playoffs ==
Semifinals
1	Omaha Knights	4
4	Oklahoma City Blazers	1
2	Dallas Black Hawks	4
3	Fort Worth Wings	0

Final
1	Omaha Knights	4
2	Dallas Black Hawks	2
