= 2001–02 Pittsburgh Penguins season =

NHL team season

2001–02 Pittsburgh Penguins
- Division: 5th Atlantic
- Conference: 12th Eastern
- 2001–02 record: 28–41–8–5
- Home record: 16–20–4–1
- Road record: 12–21–4–4
- Goals for: 198
- Goals against: 249

Team information
- General manager: Craig Patrick
- Coach: Ivan Hlinka (Oct.); Rick Kehoe (Oct.–Apr.)
- Captain: Mario Lemieux
- Alternate captains: Alexei Kovalev (Nov.–Apr.); Martin Straka; Darius Kasparaitis
- Arena: Mellon Arena
- Average attendance: 15,649
- Minor league affiliates: Wilkes-Barre/Scranton Penguins; Wheeling Nailers

Team leaders
- Goals: Alexei Kovalev (32)
- Assists: Alexei Kovalev (44)
- Points: Alexei Kovalev (76)
- Penalty minutes: Krzysztof Oliwa (150)
- Plus/minus: Robert Lang (+9)
- Wins: Johan Hedberg (25)
- Goals against average: Johan Hedberg (2.75)

The 2001–02 Pittsburgh Penguins season was the team's 35th year in the National Hockey League (NHL). The Penguins finished the year with a sub-.500 points percentage and failed to qualify for the playoffs, both for the first time since the 1989–90 season. This was the Penguins' last season with the "RoboPenguin" logo introduced during the 1992–93 Pittsburgh Penguins season. The Penguins reverted to using their original skating penguin logo afterwards.

== Off-season ==
On July 11, 2001, the Penguins shipped star right winger and team captain Jaromir Jagr, along with journeyman defenseman Frantisek Kucera, off to play for the Washington Capitals. In return, the Penguins received Kris Beech, Michal Sivek, Ross Lupaschuk, and future considerations. Team owner and franchise player Mario Lemieux, who returned from retirement in the middle of last season, regained the captaincy he once held before retiring in. The New York Rangers also made an offer for Jagr, consisting of Kim Johnsson and Mike York. The Rangers maintain that Patrick traded Jagr to the Capitals because he was angry with their general manager, Glen Sather. The trade still ranks as the fifth-worst trade in team history.

== Regular season ==
After an 0–4 start, head coach Ivan Hlinka was relieved of his duties and replaced by Rick Kehoe.

=== Final standings ===
Atlantic Division
No.	CR		GP	W	L	T	OTL	GF	GA	Pts
1	2	**Philadelphia Flyers**	82	42	27	10	3	234	192	97
2	5	**New York Islanders**	82	42	28	8	4	239	220	96
3	6	**New Jersey Devils**	82	41	28	9	4	205	187	95
4	11	New York Rangers	82	36	38	4	4	227	258	80
5	12	Pittsburgh Penguins	82	28	41	8	5	198	249	69

Note: CR = Conference rank; GP = Games played; W = Wins; L = Losses; T = Ties; OTL = Overtime loss; GF = Goals for; GA = Goals against; Pts = Points
Bolded teams qualified for the playoffs.

Eastern Conference
R		Div	GP	W	L	T	OTL	GF	GA	Pts
**1**	**Z-** Boston Bruins	**NE**	**82**	**43**	**24**	**6**	**9**	**236**	**201**	101
**2**	**Y-** Philadelphia Flyers	**AT**	**82**	**42**	**27**	**10**	**3**	**234**	**192**	97
**3**	**Y-** Carolina Hurricanes	**SE**	**82**	**35**	**26**	**16**	**5**	**217**	**217**	91
**4**	**X-** Toronto Maple Leafs	**NE**	**82**	**43**	**25**	**10**	**4**	**249**	**207**	100
**5**	**X-** New York Islanders	**AT**	**82**	**42**	**28**	**8**	**4**	**239**	**220**	96
**6**	**X-** New Jersey Devils	**AT**	**82**	**41**	**28**	**9**	**4**	**205**	**187**	95
**7**	**X-** Ottawa Senators	**NE**	**82**	**39**	**27**	**9**	**7**	**243**	**208**	94
**8**	**X-** Montreal Canadiens	**NE**	**82**	**36**	**31**	**12**	**3**	**207**	**209**	87
8.5
9	Washington Capitals	SE	82	36	33	11	2	228	240	85
10	Buffalo Sabres	NE	82	35	35	11	1	213	200	82
11	New York Rangers	AT	82	36	38	4	4	227	258	80
12	Pittsburgh Penguins	AT	82	28	41	8	5	198	249	69
13	Tampa Bay Lightning	SE	82	27	40	11	4	178	219	69
14	Florida Panthers	SE	82	22	44	10	6	180	250	60
15	Atlanta Thrashers	SE	82	19	47	11	5	187	288	54

Divisions: AT – Atlantic, NE – Northeast, SE – Southeast

Z – Clinched conference; Y – Clinched division; X – Clinched playoff spot

== Schedule and results ==
2001–02 regular season
October: 4–6–1–1 (home: 2–3–1–0; road: 2–3–0–1), 10 Points

#	Oct	Visitor	Score	Home	Location/Attendance	Record	Points	Recap
1	3	Colorado Avalanche	3–1	Pittsburgh Penguins	Mellon Arena (17,148)	0–1–0–0	0	L
2	6	Mighty Ducks of Anaheim	4–2	Pittsburgh Penguins	Mellon Arena (15,411)	0–2–0–0	0	L
3	10	New York Islanders	6–3	Pittsburgh Penguins	Mellon Arena (14,038)	0–3–0–0	0	L
4	14	Pittsburgh Penguins	4–1	Buffalo Sabres	HSBC Arena (15,815)	0–4–0–0	0	L
5	16	Ottawa Senators	2–5	Pittsburgh Penguins	Mellon Arena (14,907)	1–4–0–0	2	W
6	18	Pittsburgh Penguins	0–3	Ottawa Senators	Corel Centre (15,521)	2–4–0–0	4	W
7	20	Pittsburgh Penguins	2–1 OT	St. Louis Blues	Savvis Center (18,854)	2–4–0–1	5	OTL
8	23	Pittsburgh Penguins	2–4	Atlanta Thrashers	Philips Arena (13,281)	3–4–0–1	7	W
9	24	Dallas Stars	2–3	Pittsburgh Penguins	Mellon Arena (16,958)	4–4–0–1	9	W
10	27	Pittsburgh Penguins	4–0	Toronto Maple Leafs	Air Canada Centre (19,166)	4–5–0–1	9	L
11	28	Florida Panthers	2–2	Pittsburgh Penguins	Mellon Arena (16,449)	4–5–1–1	10	T
12	31	Pittsburgh Penguins	3–0	Philadelphia Flyers	First Union Center (19,365)	4–6–1–1	10	L

November: 6–4–1–2 (home: 5–1–1–0; road: 1–3–1–1), 15 Points

#	Nov	Visitor	Score	Home	Location/Attendance	Record	Points	Recap
13	1	Toronto Maple Leafs	1–3	Pittsburgh Penguins	Mellon Arena (14,763)	5–6–1–1	12	W
14	3	Tampa Bay Lightning	1–2 OT	Pittsburgh Penguins	Mellon Arena (17,148)	6–6–1–1	14	W
15	6	Pittsburgh Penguins	2–2	Carolina Hurricanes	Raleigh Entertainment & Sports Arena (15,938)	6–6–2–1	15	T
16	7	Pittsburgh Penguins	2–0	Florida Panthers	National Car Rental Center (16,164)	6–7–2–1	15	L
17	10	Pittsburgh Penguins	3–2 OT	Tampa Bay Lightning	Ice Palace Arena (18,812)	6–7–2–2	16	OTL
18	13	Pittsburgh Penguins	1–5	New Jersey Devils	Continental Airlines Arena (12,480)	7–7–2–2	18	W
19	14	New York Islanders	3–3	Pittsburgh Penguins	Mellon Arena (15,466)	7–7–3–2	19	T
20	17	New York Rangers	0–1 OT	Pittsburgh Penguins	Mellon Arena (17,027)	8–7–3–2	21	W
21	21	Vancouver Canucks	4–1	Pittsburgh Penguins	Mellon Arena (16,980)	8–8–3–2	21	L
22	23	Pittsburgh Penguins	5–0	Nashville Predators	Gaylord Entertainment Center (16,717)	8–9–3–2	21	L
23	24	Buffalo Sabres	1–3	Pittsburgh Penguins	Mellon Arena (16,958)	9–9–3–2	23	W
24	27	New Jersey Devils	0–6	Pittsburgh Penguins	Mellon Arena (13,410)	10–9–3–2	25	W
25	29	Pittsburgh Penguins	5–0	San Jose Sharks	Compaq Center (17,496)	10–10–3–2	25	L

December: 4–7–0–2 (home: 2–5–0–0; road: 2–2–2–0), 10 Points

#	Dec	Visitor	Score	Home	Location/Attendance	Record	Points	Recap
26	1	Pittsburgh Penguins	5–2	Phoenix Coyotes	America West Arena (14,109)	10–11–3–2	25	L
27	4	Pittsburgh Penguins	0–1	Toronto Maple Leafs	Air Canada Centre (19,271)	11–11–3–2	27	W
28	6	Pittsburgh Penguins	1–4	Boston Bruins	FleetCenter (14,125)	12–11–3–2	29	W
29	8	Atlanta Thrashers	3–6	Pittsburgh Penguins	Mellon Arena (14,917)	13–11–3–2	31	W
30	11	Pittsburgh Penguins	2–2	Washington Capitals	MCI Center (18,672)	13–11–4–2	32	T
31	12	Boston Bruins	4–2	Pittsburgh Penguins	Mellon Arena (13,397)	13–12–4–2	32	L
32	14	Minnesota Wild	5–2	Pittsburgh Penguins	Mellon Arena (13,378)	13–13–4–2	32	L
33	16	Carolina Hurricanes	7–0	Pittsburgh Penguins	Mellon Arena (14,226)	13–14–4–2	32	L
34	19	Montreal Canadiens	3–1	Pittsburgh Penguins	Mellon Arena (17,148)	13–15–4–2	32	L
35	21	Washington Capitals	3–4	Pittsburgh Penguins	Mellon Arena (17,148)	14–15–4–2	34	W
36	22	Pittsburgh Penguins	4–4	Washington Capitals	MCI Center (18,672)	14–15–5–2	35	T
37	26	Pittsburgh Penguins	4–0	New Jersey Devils	Continental Airlines Arena (19,040)	14–16–5–2	35	L
38	29	Ottawa Senators	5–2	Pittsburgh Penguins	Mellon Arena (17,148)	14–17–5–2	35	L

January: 8–6–1–0 (home: 4–3–0–0; road: 4–3–0–1), 17 Points

#	Jan	Visitor	Score	Home	Location/Attendance	Record	Points	Recap
39	3	Pittsburgh Penguins	4–2	New York Islanders	Nassau Coliseum (16,234)	14–18–5–2	35	L
40	5	New York Rangers	1–4	Pittsburgh Penguins	Mellon Arena (16,305)	15–18–5–2	37	W
41	6	Pittsburgh Penguins	2–0	Chicago Blackhawks	United Center (16,537)	15–19–5–2	37	L
42	8	Boston Bruins	3–2	Pittsburgh Penguins	Mellon Arena (15,897)	15–20–5–2	37	L
43	10	Pittsburgh Penguins	0–2	Buffalo Sabres	HSBC Arena (16,151)	16–20–5–2	39	W
44	12	St. Louis Blues	4–1	Pittsburgh Penguins	Mellon Arena (16,958)	16–21–5–2	39	L
45	15	Pittsburgh Penguins	5–2	Vancouver Canucks	General Motors Place (18,422)	16–22–5–2	39	L
46	17	Pittsburgh Penguins	4–6	Calgary Flames	Pengrowth Saddledome (15,437)	17–22–5–2	41	W
47	19	Pittsburgh Penguins	0–1	Edmonton Oilers	Skyreach Centre (16,839)	18–22–5–2	43	W
48	21	Philadelphia Flyers	2–5	Pittsburgh Penguins	Mellon Arena (16,958)	19–22–5–2	45	W
49	23	Tampa Bay Lightning	1–5	Pittsburgh Penguins	Mellon Arena (15,127)	20–22–5–2	47	W
50	24	Pittsburgh Penguins	4–5 OT	New York Islanders	Nassau Coliseum (16,234)	21–22–5–2	49	W
51	26	Atlanta Thrashers	2–3 OT	Pittsburgh Penguins	Mellon Arena (17,021)	22–22–5–2	51	W
52	29	Pittsburgh Penguins	3–2 OT	Philadelphia Flyers	First Union Center (19,634)	22–22–5–3	52	OTL
53	30	San Jose Sharks	6–3	Pittsburgh Penguins	Mellon Arena (15,152)	22–23–5–3	52	L

February: 1–4–1–1 (home: 0–1–0–1; road: 1–3–1–0), 4 Points

#	Feb	Visitor	Score	Home	Location/Attendance	Record	Points	Recap
54	5	Pittsburgh Penguins	3–3	Carolina Hurricanes	Raleigh Entertainment & Sports Arena (18,730)	22–23–6–3	53	T
55	7	Pittsburgh Penguins	1–0	Montreal Canadiens	Molson Centre (21,191)	22–24–6–3	53	L
56	9	New Jersey Devils	2–1 OT	Pittsburgh Penguins	Mellon Arena (17,021)	22–24–6–4	54	OTL
57	10	Pittsburgh Penguins	4–3	New York Rangers	Madison Square Garden (IV) (18,200)	22–25–6–4	54	L
58	12	Pittsburgh Penguins	5–1	Ottawa Senators	Corel Centre (17,332)	22–26–6–4	54	L
59	27	Los Angeles Kings	5–4	Pittsburgh Penguins	Mellon Arena (16,134)	22–27–6–4	54	L
60	28	Pittsburgh Penguins	3–4 OT	Columbus Blue Jackets	Nationwide Arena (18,136)	23–27–6–4	56	W

March: 5–7–1–1 (home: 3–5–1–0; road: 2–2–0–1), 12 Points

#	Mar	Visitor	Score	Home	Location/Attendance	Record	Points	Recap
61	2	Detroit Red Wings	4–2	Pittsburgh Penguins	Mellon Arena (17,148)	23–28–6–4	56	L
62	4	Pittsburgh Penguins	2–4	New York Islanders	Nassau Coliseum (13,277)	24–28–6–4	58	W
63	5	Florida Panthers	5–6 OT	Pittsburgh Penguins	Mellon Arena (12,652)	25–28–6–4	60	W
64	7	Carolina Hurricanes	3–1	Pittsburgh Penguins	Mellon Arena (15,111)	25–29–6–4	60	L
65	9	New York Rangers	2–3 OT	Pittsburgh Penguins	Mellon Arena (16,958)	26–29–6–4	62	W
66	11	Columbus Blue Jackets	4–2	Pittsburgh Penguins	Mellon Arena (13,422)	26–30–6–4	62	L
67	13	Pittsburgh Penguins	4–2	Mighty Ducks of Anaheim	Arrowhead Pond of Anaheim (12,536)	26–31–6–4	62	L
68	16	Pittsburgh Penguins	4–3	Los Angeles Kings	Staples Center (18,118)	26–32–6–4	62	L
69	18	Pittsburgh Penguins	2–4	Atlanta Thrashers	Philips Arena (12,305)	27–32–6–4	64	W
70	20	Phoenix Coyotes	3–1	Pittsburgh Penguins	Mellon Arena (12,851)	27–33–6–4	64	L
71	23	Philadelphia Flyers	4–4	Pittsburgh Penguins	Mellon Arena (17,148)	27–33–7–4	65	T
72	24	Washington Capitals	2–6	Pittsburgh Penguins	Mellon Arena (16,971)	28–33–7–4	67	W
73	27	New Jersey Devils	4–3	Pittsburgh Penguins	Mellon Arena (15,106)	28–34–7–4	67	L
74	30	Pittsburgh Penguins	2–1 OT	Montreal Canadiens	Molson Centre (21,273)	28–34–7–5	68	OTL

April: 0–7–0–1 (home: 0–2–1–0; road: 0–5–0–0), 1 Points

#	Apr	Visitor	Score	Home	Location/Attendance	Record	Points	Recap
75	1	Montreal Canadiens	3–0	Pittsburgh Penguins	Mellon Arena (14,110)	28–35–7–5	68	L
76	3	Pittsburgh Penguins	3–2	Florida Panthers	National Car Rental Center (15,614)	28–36–7–5	68	L
77	4	Pittsburgh Penguins	4–2	Tampa Bay Lightning	Amalie Arena (15,454)	28–37–7–5	68	L
78	6	Pittsburgh Penguins	3–1	Philadelphia Flyers	First Union Center (19,750)	28–38–7–5	68	L
79	8	Pittsburgh Penguins	3–2	New York Rangers	Madison Square Garden (IV) (18,200)	28–39–7–5	68	L
80	10	Buffalo Sabres	4–4	Pittsburgh Penguins	Mellon Arena (12,724)	28–39–8–5	69	T
81	12	Toronto Maple Leafs	5–2	Pittsburgh Penguins	Mellon Arena (16,816)	28–40–8–5	69	L
82	13	Pittsburgh Penguins	7–1	Boston Bruins	FleetCenter (17,565)	28–41–8–5	69	L

Legend: W Win (2 points) L Loss (0 points) T Tie (1 point) OTL Overtime loss (1 point)

== Player statistics ==
Skaters

Regular season
Player	GP	G	A	Pts	+/−	PIM
Alex Kovalev	67	32	44	76	2	80
Jan Hrdina	79	24	33	57	-7	50
Robert Lang	62	18	32	50	9	16
Aleksey Morozov	72	20	29	49	-7	16
Mario Lemieux	24	6	25	31	0	14
Randy Robitaille^{†}	40	10	20	30	-14	16
Michal Rozsival	79	9	20	29	-6	47
Stephane Richer^{‡}	58	13	12	25	-8	14
Kris Beech	79	10	15	25	-25	45
Toby Petersen	79	8	10	18	-15	4
Dan Lacouture	82	6	11	17	-19	71
Milan Kraft	68	8	8	16	-9	16
Darius Kasparaitis^{‡}	69	2	12	14	-1	123
Janne Laukkanen	47	6	7	13	-18	28
Andrew Ference	75	4	7	11	-12	73
Wayne Primeau	33	3	7	10	-1	18
Ian Moran	64	2	8	10	-11	54
Martin Straka	13	5	4	9	3	0
Hans Jonsson	53	2	5	7	-12	22
Billy Tibbetts^{‡}	33	1	5	6	-13	109
Kevin Stevens	32	1	4	5	-9	25
John Jakopin	19	0	4	4	2	42
Jeff Toms^{†}	14	2	1	3	-5	4
Shean Donovan^{†}	13	2	1	3	-5	4
Ville Nieminen^{†}	13	1	2	3	-2	8
Tom Kostopoulos	11	1	2	3	-1	9
Josef Melichar	60	0	3	3	-1	68
Mike Wilson	21	1	1	2	-12	17
Jamie Pushor^{†}	15	0	2	2	-3	30
Krzysztof Oliwa	57	0	2	2	-5	150
Rick Berry^{†}	13	0	2	2	-4	21
Kent Manderville^{†}	4	1	0	1	1	4
Eric Meloche	23	0	1	1	-7	8
Shane Endicott	4	0	1	1	-1	4
Total		198	340	538	—	1,210

Goaltenders

Regular season
Player	GP	GS	TOI	W	L	T	GA	GAA	SA	SV%	SO	G	A	PIM
Johan Hedberg	66	64	3876:33	25	34	7	178	2.76	1851	0.904	6	0	1	22
Jean-Sebastien Aubin	21	18	1094:18	3	12	1	65	3.56	537	0.879	0	0	0	0
Total		82	4970:51	28	46	8	243	2.93	2388	0.898	6	0	1	22

^{†}Denotes player spent time with another team before joining the Penguins. Stats reflect time with the Penguins only.
^{‡}Denotes player was traded mid-season. Stats reflect time with the Penguins only.

== Awards and records ==
- Mario Lemieux became the first person to score 1600 points for the Penguins. He did so in a 4–5 Loss to Los Angeles on February 27.
- Kevin Stevens ended his career as the franchise record holder for penalty minutes (1048). He had set the record the year before.

=== Awards ===
Type	Award/honor	Recipient	Ref
League (in-season)	NHL All-Star Game selection	Mario Lemieux	
League (in-season)	NHL YoungStars Game selection	Andrew Ference	
Team	A. T. Caggiano Memorial Booster Club Award	Alexei Kovalev	
Team	Aldege "Baz" Bastien Memorial Good Guy Award	Johan Hedberg	
Team	Bob Johnson Memorial Badger Bob Award	Ian Moran	
Team	Leading Scorer Award	Alexei Kovalev	
Team	Michel Briere Memorial Rookie of the Year Trophy	Johan Hedberg	
Team	Most Valuable Player Award	Alexei Kovalev	
Team	Players' Player Award	Alexei Kovalev	
Team	Players' Player Award	Ian Moran	
Team	The Edward J. DeBartolo Community Service Award	Andrew Ference	

=== Milestones ===
Milestone	Player	Date	Ref
1,000th game played	Stephane Richer	November 3, 2001	
First game	Tom Kostopoulos	December 29, 2001	
First game	Eric Meloche	January 15, 2002	
First game	Shane Endicott	January 29, 2002	

== Transactions ==
The Penguins were involved in the following transactions from June 10, 2001, the day after the deciding game of the 2001 Stanley Cup Final, through June 13, 2002, the day of the deciding game of the 2002 Stanley Cup Final.

=== Trades ===
Date	Details		Ref
July 11, 2001	To Washington Capitals: Jaromir Jagr; Frantisek Kucera	To Pittsburgh Penguins: Kris Beech; Ross Lupaschuk; Michal Sivek; Future considerations	
March 8, 2002	To Anaheim Mighty Ducks: Mark Moore	To Pittsburgh Penguins: Bert Robertsson	
March 15, 2002	To Columbus Blue Jackets: 4th-round pick in 2003	To Pittsburgh Penguins: Jamie Pushor	
March 17, 2002	To Philadelphia Flyers: Billy Tibbetts	To Pittsburgh Penguins: Kent Manderville	
March 19, 2002	To New Jersey Devils: Stephane Richer	To Pittsburgh Penguins: 7th-round pick in 2003	
March 19, 2002	To Colorado Avalanche: Darius Kasparaitis	To Pittsburgh Penguins: Rick Berry; Ville Nieminen	
May 15, 2002	To Nashville Predators: Steve Parsons	To Pittsburgh Penguins: Future considerations	

=== Players acquired ===
Date	Player	Former team	Term	Via	Ref
July 5, 2001	Mike Wilson	Florida Panthers	3-year	Free agency	
July 30, 2001	Steve Parsons	Hershey Bears (AHL)		Free agency	
August 14, 2001	Peter Ratchuk	Florida Panthers		Free agency	
August 14, 2001	Rob Tallas	Chicago Blackhawks		Free agency	
October 2, 2001	John Jakopin	Florida Panthers		Waivers	
October 2, 2001	Stephane Richer	Washington Capitals		Free agency	
January 4, 2002	Randy Robitaille	Los Angeles Kings		Waivers	
March 15, 2002	Shean Donovan	Atlanta Thrashers		Waivers	
March 16, 2002	Jeff Toms	New York Rangers		Waivers	

=== Players lost ===
Date	Player	New team	Via (Note: In parentheses is the player's free agency group on July 1 if applicable.)	Ref
N/A	Boris Protsenko	Amur Khabarovsk (RSL)	Free agency (UFA)	
July 1, 2001	Craig Hillier (Note: Hillier was inactive during the 2001–02 season.)		Contract expiration (UFA)	
July 1, 2001	Garth Snow	New York Islanders	Free agency (III)	
July 2, 2001	Bob Boughner	Calgary Flames	Free agency (UFA)	
July 12, 2001	Rich Parent	Iserlohn Roosters (DEL)	Free agency (UFA)	
July 13, 2001	Trent Cull	Minnesota Wild	Free agency (VI)	
July 23, 2001	Chris Kelleher	Boston Bruins	Free agency (VI)	
July 31, 2001	Kip Miller	Grand Rapids Griffins (AHL)	Free agency (III)	
August 8, 2001	Greg Crozier	Boston Bruins	Free agency (UFA)	
August 28, 2001	Steve McKenna	New York Rangers	Free agency (UFA)	
September 10, 2001	Josef Beranek	HC Slavia Praha (ELH)	Free agency (III)	
October 5, 2001	Dennis Bonvie	Boston Bruins	Free agency (VI)	
November 5, 2001	Rene Corbet	Adler Mannheim (DEL)	Free agency (UFA)	
November 6, 2001	Marc Bergevin	St. Louis Blues	Free agency (III)	
January 22, 2002	Bobby Dollas	Laval Chiefs (QSPHL)	Free agency (III)	

=== Signings ===
Date	Player	Term	Contract type	Ref
June 11, 2001	Kevin Stevens		Re-signing	
June 14, 2001	Rob Scuderi		Entry-level	
July 10, 2001	Robert Dome		Re-signing	
July 13, 2001	Hans Jonsson		Re-signing	
July 13, 2001	Eric Meloche		Re-signing	
July 16, 2001	David Koci		Entry-level	
July 16, 2001	Tomas Surovy		Entry-level	
July 18, 2001	Jason MacDonald		Re-signing	
July 24, 2001	Dan LaCouture	1-year	Re-signing	
July 24, 2001	Ian Moran	2-year	Re-signing	
July 24, 2001	Billy Tibbetts	1-year	Re-signing	
July 31, 2001	Jean-Sebastien Aubin		Re-signing	
July 31, 2001	Alexei Morozov		Re-signing	
August 10, 2001	Martin Straka	2-year	Arbitration award	
August 11, 2001	Jan Hrdina	2-year	Arbitration award	
August 13, 2001	Robert Lang	1-year	Arbitration award	
August 14, 2001	Brooks Orpik		Entry-level	
August 15, 2001	Alexei Kovalev	2-year	Arbitration award	
August 20, 2001	Darius Kasparaitis	2-year	Re-signing	
August 21, 2001	Mario Lemieux	1-year	Re-signing	
August 29, 2001	Wayne Primeau		Re-signing	
September 6, 2001	Johan Hedberg	multi-year	Re-signing	
September 6, 2001	Martin Straka	multi-year	Re-signing	
September 8, 2001	Michal Roszival		Re-signing	
October 5, 2001	Shane Endicott		Entry-level	
June 3, 2002	Steven Crampton		Entry-level	
June 3, 2002	Michel Ouellet		Entry-level	

=== Other ===
Name	Date	Notes
Ivan Hlinka	October 14, 2001	Fired as head coach
Rick Kehoe	October 14, 2001	Hired as head coach

== Draft picks ==
The Penguins selected the following players in the 2001 NHL entry draft at the National Car Rental Center in Sunrise, Florida:

Round	#	Player	Pos	Nationality	College/junior/club team (league)
1	21	Colby Armstrong	RW	Canada	Red Deer Rebels (WHL)
2	54	Noah Welch	D	United States	Saint Sebastian's School (USHS-MA)
3	86	Drew Fata	D	Canada	Toronto St. Michael's Majors (OHL)
3	96^{[a]}	Alexandre Rouleau	D	Canada	Val-d'Or Foreurs (QMJHL)
4	120	Tomas Surovy	LW	Slovakia	HK Poprad (Slovakia)
4	131^{[b]}	Ben Eaves	C	United States	Boston College (Hockey East)
5	156	Andy Schneider	D	United States	Lincoln Stars (USHL)
7	217	Tomas Duba	G	Czech Republic	Sparta Prague (Czech Extraliga)
8	250	Brandon Crawford-West	G	United States	Texas Tornado (NAHL)

Draft notes

- ^{a} Compensatory pick received from NHL as compensation for free agent Ron Tugnutt.
- ^{b} Compensatory pick received from NHL as compensation for free agent Peter Popovic.
- The Pittsburgh Penguins' sixth-round pick went to the Columbus Blue Jackets as the result of a March 13, 2001, trade that sent Frantisek Kucera to the Penguins in exchange for this pick.
- The Pittsburgh Penguins' ninth-round pick went to the New York Islanders as the result of a November 14, 2000, trade that sent Dan Trebil to the Penguins in exchange for this pick.

== Farm teams ==
The American Hockey League's Wilkes-Barre/Scranton Penguins, after losing in the Calder Cup Finals the previous season, finished last overall in the Western Conference with a 20–44–13–3 record.

The ECHL's Wheeling Nailers finished fifth in the Northern Conference's Northwest Division with a 36–32–4 record. It was their first year under John Brophy.

== See also ==
- 2001–02 NHL season
