= List of Pittsburgh Penguins award winners =

Pittsburgh Penguins awards
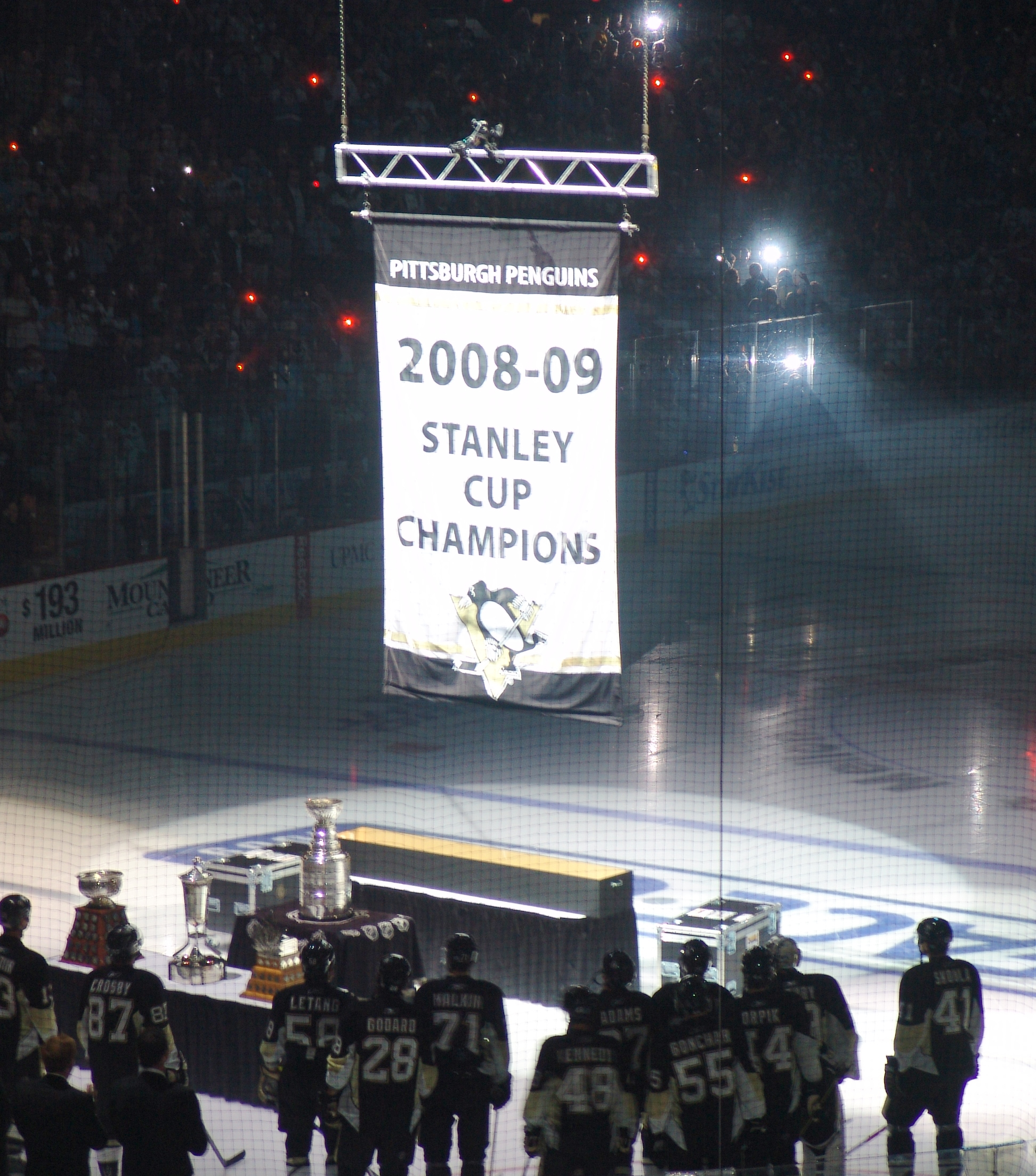
- The 2008–09 Stanley Cup championship banner being raised to the rafters.

Team trophies
- Award*: Wins
- Stanley Cup: 5
- Prince of Wales Trophy: 6
- Presidents' Trophy: 1

Individual awards
- Award*: Wins
- Art Ross Trophy: 15
- Bill Masterton Memorial Trophy: 3
- Calder Memorial Trophy: 2
- Conn Smythe Trophy: 5
- Frank J. Selke Trophy: 1
- General Manager of the Year Award: 2
- Hart Memorial Trophy: 7
- Jack Adams Award: 1
- James Norris Memorial Trophy: 1
- Lady Byng Memorial Trophy: 3
- Lester Patrick Trophy: 9
- Mark Messier Leadership Award: 1
- Maurice "Rocket" Richard Trophy: 2
- NHL Plus-Minus Award: 2
- Ted Lindsay Award: 10

Total
- Awards won: 93

This is a list of Pittsburgh Penguins award winners.

== League awards ==
=== Team trophies ===
Team trophies awarded to the Pittsburgh Penguins
Award	Description	Times won	Seasons	References
Stanley Cup	NHL championship	5	1990–91, 1991–92, 2008–09, 2015–16, 2016–17	
Prince of Wales Trophy	Wales/Eastern Conference playoff championship (1981–present)	6	1990–91, 1991–92, 2007–08, 2008–09, 2015–16, 2016–17	
Presidents' Trophy	Most regular season points	1	1992–93	

=== Individual awards ===
Individual awards won by Pittsburgh Penguins players and staff
Award	Description	Winner	Season	References
Art Ross Trophy	Regular season scoring champion	Mario Lemieux	1987–88	
Art Ross Trophy	Regular season scoring champion	Mario Lemieux	1988–89	
Art Ross Trophy	Regular season scoring champion	Mario Lemieux	1991–92	
Art Ross Trophy	Regular season scoring champion	Mario Lemieux	1992–93	
Art Ross Trophy	Regular season scoring champion	Mario Lemieux	1995–96	
Art Ross Trophy	Regular season scoring champion	Mario Lemieux	1996–97	
Art Ross Trophy	Regular season scoring champion	Jaromir Jagr	1994–95	
Art Ross Trophy	Regular season scoring champion	Jaromir Jagr	1997–98	
Art Ross Trophy	Regular season scoring champion	Jaromir Jagr	1998–99	
Art Ross Trophy	Regular season scoring champion	Jaromir Jagr	1999–2000	
Art Ross Trophy	Regular season scoring champion	Jaromir Jagr	2000–01	
Art Ross Trophy	Regular season scoring champion	Sidney Crosby	2006–07	
Art Ross Trophy	Regular season scoring champion	Sidney Crosby	2013–14	
Art Ross Trophy	Regular season scoring champion	Evgeni Malkin	2008–09	
Art Ross Trophy	Regular season scoring champion	Evgeni Malkin	2011–12	
Bill Masterton Memorial Trophy	Perseverance, sportsmanship and dedication to hockey	Lowell MacDonald	1972–73	
Bill Masterton Memorial Trophy	Perseverance, sportsmanship and dedication to hockey	Mario Lemieux	1992–93	
Bill Masterton Memorial Trophy	Perseverance, sportsmanship and dedication to hockey	Kris Letang	2022–23	
Calder Memorial Trophy	Rookie of the year	Mario Lemieux	1984–85	
Calder Memorial Trophy	Rookie of the year	Evgeni Malkin	2006–07	
Conn Smythe Trophy	Most valuable player of the playoffs	Mario Lemieux	1990–91	
Conn Smythe Trophy	Most valuable player of the playoffs	Mario Lemieux	1991–92	
Conn Smythe Trophy	Most valuable player of the playoffs	Evgeni Malkin	2008–09	
Conn Smythe Trophy	Most valuable player of the playoffs	Sidney Crosby	2015–16	
Conn Smythe Trophy	Most valuable player of the playoffs	Sidney Crosby	2016–17	
Frank J. Selke Trophy	Forward who best excels in the defensive aspect of the game	Ron Francis	1994–95	
General manager of the Year Award	Top general manager	Ray Shero	2012–13	
General manager of the Year Award	Top general manager	Jim Rutherford	2015–16	
Hart Memorial Trophy	Most valuable player to his team during the regular season	Mario Lemieux	1987–88	
Hart Memorial Trophy	Most valuable player to his team during the regular season	Mario Lemieux	1992–93	
Hart Memorial Trophy	Most valuable player to his team during the regular season	Mario Lemieux	1995–96	
Hart Memorial Trophy	Most valuable player to his team during the regular season	Jaromir Jagr	1998–99	
Hart Memorial Trophy	Most valuable player to his team during the regular season	Sidney Crosby	2006–07	
Hart Memorial Trophy	Most valuable player to his team during the regular season	Sidney Crosby	2012–13	
Hart Memorial Trophy	Most valuable player to his team during the regular season	Evgeni Malkin	2011–12	
Jack Adams Award	Top coach during the regular season	Dan Bylsma	2010–11	
James Norris Memorial Trophy	Top defenseman during the regular season	Randy Carlyle	1980–81	
Lady Byng Memorial Trophy	Gentlemanly conduct	Rick Kehoe	1980–81	
Lady Byng Memorial Trophy	Gentlemanly conduct	Ron Francis	1994–95	
Lady Byng Memorial Trophy	Gentlemanly conduct	Ron Francis	1997–98	
Mark Messier Leadership Award	Player who exemplifies leadership on and off the ice	Sidney Crosby	2009–10	
Maurice "Rocket" Richard Trophy	Most goals in the regular season	Sidney Crosby	2009–10 (Note: Shared with Steven Stamkos of the Tampa Bay Lightning.)	
Maurice "Rocket" Richard Trophy	Most goals in the regular season	Sidney Crosby	2016–17	
NHL Plus-Minus Award	Highest plus/minus	Mario Lemieux	1992–93	
NHL Plus-Minus Award	Highest plus/minus	Ron Francis	1994–95	
Ted Lindsay Award	Most valuable player as chosen by the players	Mario Lemieux	1985–86	
Ted Lindsay Award	Most valuable player as chosen by the players	Mario Lemieux	1987–88	
Ted Lindsay Award	Most valuable player as chosen by the players	Mario Lemieux	1992–93	
Ted Lindsay Award	Most valuable player as chosen by the players	Mario Lemieux	1995–96	
Ted Lindsay Award	Most valuable player as chosen by the players	Jaromir Jagr	1998–99	
Ted Lindsay Award	Most valuable player as chosen by the players	Jaromir Jagr	1999–2000	
Ted Lindsay Award	Most valuable player as chosen by the players	Sidney Crosby	2006–07	
Ted Lindsay Award	Most valuable player as chosen by the players	Sidney Crosby	2012–13	
Ted Lindsay Award	Most valuable player as chosen by the players	Sidney Crosby	2013–14	
Ted Lindsay Award	Most valuable player as chosen by the players	Evgeni Malkin	2011–12	

== All-Stars ==
=== NHL first and second team All-Stars ===
The NHL first and second team All-Stars are the top players at each position as voted on by the Professional Hockey Writers' Association.

Pittsburgh Penguins selected to the NHL First and Second Team All-Stars
Player	Position	Selections	Season	Team
Tom Barrasso	Goaltender	1	1992–93	2nd
Randy Carlyle	Defense	1	1980–81	1st
Paul Coffey	Defense	2	1988–89	1st
Paul Coffey	Defense	2	1989–90	2nd
Sidney Crosby	Center	8	2006–07	1st
Sidney Crosby	Center	8	2009–10	2nd
Sidney Crosby	Center	8	2012–13	1st
Sidney Crosby	Center	8	2013–14	1st
Sidney Crosby	Center	8	2014–15	2nd
Sidney Crosby	Center	8	2015–16	1st
Sidney Crosby	Center	8	2016–17	2nd
Sidney Crosby	Center	8	2018–19	2nd
Jaromir Jagr	Right wing	7	1994–95	1st
Jaromir Jagr	Right wing	7	1995–96	1st
Jaromir Jagr	Right wing	7	1996–97	2nd
Jaromir Jagr	Right wing	7	1997–98	1st
Jaromir Jagr	Right wing	7	1998–99	1st
Jaromir Jagr	Right wing	7	1999–2000	1st
Jaromir Jagr	Right wing	7	2000–01	1st
Chris Kunitz	Left wing	1	2012–13	1st
Mario Lemieux	Center	9	1985–86	2nd
Mario Lemieux	Center	9	1986–87	2nd
Mario Lemieux	Center	9	1987–88	1st
Mario Lemieux	Center	9	1988–89	1st
Mario Lemieux	Center	9	1991–92	2nd
Mario Lemieux	Center	9	1992–93	1st
Mario Lemieux	Center	9	1995–96	1st
Mario Lemieux	Center	9	1996–97	1st
Mario Lemieux	Center	9	2000–01	2nd
Kris Letang	Defense	2	2012–13	2nd
Kris Letang	Defense	2	2015–16	2nd
Evgeni Malkin	Center	3	2007–08	1st
Evgeni Malkin	Center	3	2008–09	1st
Evgeni Malkin	Center	3	2011–12	1st
Larry Murphy	Defense	2	1992–93	2nd
Larry Murphy	Defense	2	1994–95	2nd
James Neal	Right wing	1	2011–12	1st
Kevin Stevens	Left wing	3	1990–91	2nd
Kevin Stevens	Left wing	3	1991–92	1st
Kevin Stevens	Left wing	3	1992–93	2nd

=== NHL All-Rookie Team ===
The NHL All-Rookie Team consists of the top rookies at each position as voted on by the Professional Hockey Writers' Association.

Pittsburgh Penguins selected to the NHL All-Rookie Team
Player	Position	Season
Sebastien Caron	Goaltender	2002–03
Sidney Crosby	Forward	2005–06
Jaromir Jagr	Forward	1990–91
Patrick Lalime	Goaltender	1996–97
Mario Lemieux	Forward	1984–85
Evgeni Malkin	Forward	2006–07
Ryan Malone	Forward	2003–04
Matt Murray	Goaltender	2016–17
Jordan Staal	Forward	2006–07
Warren Young	Forward	1984–85
Zarley Zalapski	Defense	1988–89

=== All-Star Game selections ===
The National Hockey League All-Star Game is a mid-season exhibition game held annually between many of the top players of each season. Forty-four All-Star Games have been held since the Penguins entered the NHL in 1967, with at least one player chosen to represent the Penguins in each year except 2004. The All-Star Game has not been held in various years: 1979 and 1987 due to the 1979 Challenge Cup and Rendez-vous '87 series between the NHL and the Soviet national team, respectively; 1995, 2005 and 2013 as a result of labor stoppages; 2006, 2010, 2014 and 2026 due to the Winter Olympic Games; 2021 as a result of the COVID-19 pandemic; and 2025 when it was replaced by the 2025 4 Nations Face-Off. Pittsburgh has hosted one of the games. The 41st took place at the Civic Arena.

- † Selected by fan vote
- ‡ Selected by Commissioner
- # Selected as one of four "last men in" by fan vote
- ↑ All-Star Game Most Valuable Player

Pittsburgh Penguins players and coaches selected to the All-Star Game
Game	Year	Name	Position	References
21st	1968	Ken Schinkel	Right wing	
22nd	1969	Ken Schinkel	Right wing	
23rd	1970	Dean Prentice	Left wing	
23rd	1970	Bob Woytowich	Defense	
24th	1971	Greg Polis	Left wing	
25th	1972	Greg Polis	Left wing	
26th	1973	Lowell MacDonald	Right wing	
26th	1973	Greg Polis↑	Left wing	
27th	1974	Dave Burrows	Defense	
27th	1974	Lowell MacDonald	Right wing	
28th	1975	Syl Apps, Jr.↑	Center	
28th	1975	Jean Pronovost	Right wing	
29th	1976	Dave Burrows	Defense	
29th	1976	Pierre Larouche	Center	
29th	1976	Jean Pronovost	Right wing	
30th	1977	Jean Pronovost	Right wing	
31st	1978	Jean Pronovost	Right wing	
32nd	1980	Ron Stackhouse	Defense	
33rd	1981	Randy Carlyle	Defense	
33rd	1981	Rick Kehoe	Right wing	
34th	1982	Randy Carlyle	Defense	
34th	1982	Michel Dion	Goaltender	
35th	1983	Rick Kehoe	Right wing	
36th	1984	Mike Bullard	Center	
37th	1985	Mario Lemieux†↑	Center	
38th	1986	Mario Lemieux†	Center	
39th	1988	Paul Coffey†	Defense	
39th	1988	Mario Lemieux†↑	Center	
40th	1989	Rob Brown	Center	
40th	1989	Paul Coffey†	Defense	
40th	1989	Mario Lemieux†	Center	
41st	1990	Paul Coffey	Defense	
41st	1990	Mario Lemieux†↑	Center	
42nd	1991	Paul Coffey†	Defense	
42nd	1991	John Cullen	Center	
42nd	1991	Mark Recchi	Right wing	
42nd	1991	Kevin Stevens	Left wing	
43rd	1992	Scotty Bowman	Coach	
43rd	1992	Paul Coffey†	Defense	
43rd	1992	Jaromir Jagr†	Right wing	
43rd	1992	Mario Lemieux†	Center	
43rd	1992	Kevin Stevens†	Left wing	
43rd	1992	Bryan Trottier‡	Center	
44th	1993	Scotty Bowman	Coach	
44th	1993	Jaromir Jagr†	Right wing	
44th	1993	Mario Lemieux† (Did not play)	Center	
44th	1993	Kevin Stevens†	Left wing	
44th	1993	Rick Tocchet (Subbed for Lemieux)	Right wing	
45th	1994	Jaromir Jagr (Did not play)	Right wing	
45th	1994	Joe Mullen‡ (Subbed for Mark Howe)	Right wing	
45th	1994	Larry Murphy	Defense	
46th	1996	Ron Francis	Center	
46th	1996	Jaromir Jagr†	Right wing	
46th	1996	Mario Lemieux†	Center	
47th	1997	Kevin Hatcher	Defense	
47th	1997	Jaromir Jagr† (Did not play)	Right wing	
47th	1997	Mario Lemieux†	Center	
48th	1998	Jaromir Jagr	Right wing	
49th	1999	Jaromir Jagr†	Right wing	
49th	1999	Martin Straka	Center	
50th	2000	Jaromir Jagr†	Right wing	
51st	2001	Jaromir Jagr† (Did not play)	Right wing	
51st	2001	Alexei Kovalev	Right wing	
51st	2001	Mario Lemieux	Center	
52nd	2002	Mario Lemieux	Center	
53rd	2003	Alexei Kovalev	Right wing	
53rd	2003	Mario Lemieux (Did not play)	Center	
54th	2004	No Penguins selected	—	
55th	2007	Sidney Crosby†	Center	
56th	2008	Sidney Crosby† (Did not play)	Center	
56th	2008	Sergei Gonchar	Defense	
56th	2008	Evgeni Malkin‡ (Subbed for Crosby)	Center	
57th	2009	Sidney Crosby† (Did not play)	Center	
57th	2009	Evgeni Malkin†	Center	
58th	2011	Sidney Crosby† (Did not play)	Center	
58th	2011	Marc-Andre Fleury†	Goaltender	
58th	2011	Kris Letang	Defense	
58th	2011	Evgeni Malkin† (Did not play)	Center	
59th	2012	Kris Letang	Defense	
59th	2012	Evgeni Malkin	Center	
59th	2012	James Neal	Left wing	
60th	2015	Sidney Crosby (Did not play)	Center	
60th	2015	Marc-Andre Fleury	Goaltender	
60th	2015	Evgeni Malkin (Did not play)	Center	
61st	2016	Kris Letang	Defense	
61st	2016	Evgeni Malkin	Center	
62nd	2017	Sidney Crosby†	Center	
62nd	2017	Evgeni Malkin (Did not play)	Center	
63rd	2018	Sidney Crosby	Center	
63rd	2018	Kris Letang	Defense	
64th	2019	Sidney Crosby↑	Center	
64th	2019	Kris Letang#	Defense	
65th	2020	Jake Guentzel (Did not play)	Center	
65th	2020	Tristan Jarry‡ (Subbed for Joonas Korpisalo)	Goaltender	
65th	2020	Kris Letang‡ (Subbed for Guentzel)	Defense	
66th	2022	Jake Guentzel# (Subbed for Mika Zibanejad)	Center	
66th	2022	Tristan Jarry	Goaltender	
67th	2023	Sidney Crosby	Center	
68th	2024	Sidney Crosby	Center	

=== All-Star Game replacement events ===
- † Selected by fan vote

Pittsburgh Penguins players and coaches selected to All-Star Game replacement events
Event	Year	Name	Position	References
Challenge Cup	1979	No Penguins selected	—	
Rendez-vous '87	1987	Mario Lemieux†	Center	
4 Nations Face-Off	2025	Sidney Crosby (Canada)	Center	
4 Nations Face-Off	2025	Erik Karlsson (Sweden)	Defense	
4 Nations Face-Off	2025	Rickard Rakell (Sweden)	Right wing	
4 Nations Face-Off	2025	Mike Sullivan (United States)	Head coach	

== Career achievements ==
=== Hockey Hall of Fame ===
The following is a list of Pittsburgh Penguins who have been enshrined in the Hockey Hall of Fame.

Pittsburgh Penguins inducted into the Hockey Hall of Fame
Individual	Category	Year inducted	Years with Penguins in category	References
Tom Barrasso	Player	2023	1988-2000	
Andy Bathgate	Player	1978	1967–1968, 1970–1971	
Leo Boivin	Player	1986	1967–1969	
Scotty Bowman	Builder	1991	1990–1993	
Herb Brooks	Builder	2006	1999–2000	
Brian Burke	Builder	2026	2021-2023	
Paul Coffey	Player	2004	1987–1992	
Ron Francis	Player	2007	1991–1998	
Tim Horton	Player	1977	1971–1972	
Marian Hossa	Player	2020	2008	
Jarome Iginla	Player	2020	2013	
Bob Johnson	Builder	1992	1990–1991	
Mario Lemieux	Player	1997	1984–1997, 2000–2006	
Joe Mullen	Player	2000	1990–1995, 1996–1997	
Larry Murphy	Player	2004	1990–1995	
Craig Patrick	Builder	2001	1989–2006	
Mark Recchi	Player	2017	1989–1992, 2005–2007	
Luc Robitaille	Player	2009	1994–1995	
Jim Rutherford	Builder	2019	2014–2021	
Bryan Trottier	Player	1997	1990–1992, 1993–1994	
Sergei Zubov	Player	2019	1995–1996	

=== Foster Hewitt Memorial Award ===
One member of the Pittsburgh Penguins organization has been honored with the Foster Hewitt Memorial Award. The award is presented by the Hockey Hall of Fame to members of the radio and television industry who make outstanding contributions to their profession and the game of ice hockey during their broadcasting career.

Members of the Pittsburgh Penguins honored with the Foster Hewitt Memorial Award
Individual	Year honored	Years with Penguins as broadcaster	References
Mike Lange	2001	1974–1975, 1976–2021	

=== Lester Patrick Trophy ===
The Lester Patrick Trophy has been presented by the NHL and USA Hockey since 1966 to honor a recipient's contribution to ice hockey in the United States. This list includes all personnel who have ever been employed by the Pittsburgh Penguins in any capacity and have also received the Lester Patrick Trophy.

Members of the Pittsburgh Penguins honored with the Lester Patrick Trophy
Individual	Year honored	Years with Penguins	References
Scotty Bowman	2001	1990–1993	
Bob Johnson	1988	1990–1991	
Mark Johnson	2011	1980–1982	
Joe Mullen	1995	1990–1995, 1996–1997	
Mario Lemieux	2000	1984–1997, 2000–2006	
Craig Patrick	2000	1989–2006	

=== United States Hockey Hall of Fame ===
Members of the Pittsburgh Penguins inducted into the United States Hockey Hall of Fame
Individual	Year inducted	Years with Penguins	References
Tom Barrasso	2009	1988–2000	
Herb Brooks	1990	1999–2000	
Bill Guerin	2013	2009–2010	
Kevin Hatcher	2010	1996–1999	
Bob Johnson	1991	1990–1991	
Mark Johnson	2004	1980–1982	
Jack Kelley	1993	1993–2001	
John LeClair	2009	2005–2006	
Joe Mullen	1998	1990–1995, 1996–1997	
Ed Olczyk	2012	1997–1998	
Bob Paradise	1989	1974–1975, 1977–1979	
Craig Patrick	1996	1989–2006	
Mike Ramsey	2001	1993–1994	
Gordie Roberts	1999	1990–1992	
Scott Young	2017	1990–1991	

=== Retired numbers ===
The Pittsburgh Penguins have retired three of their jersey numbers. Michel Briere's number 21 was removed from circulation following Briere's death on April 13, 1971, but it was not officially retired until January 5, 2001. Mario Lemieux's number 66 was originally retired on November 19, 1997, after his first retirement. The number was unretired when he began his comeback on December 27, 2000, and re-retired on October 5, 2006, after Lemieux announced his second retirement during the previous season. Jaromir Jagr's number 68 was retired on February 18, 2024. Also out of circulation is the number 99 which was retired League-wide for Wayne Gretzky on February 6, 2000. Gretzky did not play for the Penguins during his 20-year NHL career and no Penguins player had ever worn the number 99 prior to its retirement.

Pittsburgh Penguins retired numbers
Number	Player	Position	Years with Penguins as a player	Date of retirement ceremony	References
21	Michel Briere	Center	1969–1970	January 5, 2001	
66	Mario Lemieux	Center	1984–1997, 2000–2006	November 19, 1997	
66	Mario Lemieux	Center	1984–1997, 2000–2006	October 5, 2006	
68	Jaromir Jagr	Right wing	1990–2001	February 18, 2024	

== Team awards ==
=== Penguins' Ring of Honor ===
A mural honoring members of the franchise's "Millennium Team", it was first displayed September 26, 2003. This was a permanent display at Mellon Arena until its demolition, designed to honor past greats without having to retire their numbers. Current members are:

- Tom Barrasso (G)
- Les Binkley (G)
- Herb Brooks (Coach)
- Dave Burrows (D)
- Paul Coffey (D)
- Ron Francis (F)
- Jaromir Jagr (F)
- Bob Johnson (Coach)
- Rick Kehoe (F)
- Mario Lemieux (F)
- Larry Murphy (D)
- Craig Patrick (GM-coach)
- Jean Pronovost (F)
- Ulf Samuelsson (D)
- Kevin Stevens (F)
- Mark Recchi (F)

=== Penguins Hall of Fame ===
- Bob Johnson, head coach (1990–1991) inducted 1992
- Jean Pronovost, RW (1968–1978) inducted 1992
- Rick Kehoe, RW (1974–1985) inducted 1992
- Syl Apps, Jr., C (1970–1978) inducted 1994
- Edward J. DeBartolo Sr., owner (1977–1991) inducted 1996
- Dave Burrows, D (1971–1978, 1980–1982) inducted 1996
- Elaine Heufelder, front office (1967–2003) inducted 1996
- Mario Lemieux, C (1984–1997, 2000–2006), owner (1999–present) inducted 1999
- Jack Riley, GM (1967–1970, 1972–1974) inducted 1999
- Joe Mullen, RW (1990–1995, 1996–1997) inducted 2000
- Craig Patrick, GM (1989–2006) inducted 2001
- Mike Lange, broadcaster (1974–1975, 1976–present) inducted 2001
- Anthony "A.T." Caggiano, locker room (1967–2000) inducted 2001
- Les Binkley, G (1967–1972) inducted 2003
- Ulf Samuelsson, D (1991–1995) inducted 2003
- Vince Lascheid, organist (1970–2003) inducted 2003
- Paul Coffey, D (1987–1992) inducted 2007
- Frank Sciulli, locker room (1967–2007) inducted 2007

=== Michel Briere Memorial Rookie of the Year Trophy ===
The Michel Briere Memorial Rookie of the Year Trophy is an annual award given to the player who was the most proficient player on the team in his first year of competition in the league. It is named in memory of Michel Briere, who died in a car accident at the end of the 1969–70 NHL season. Briere himself won the award that season, when it was known as the Rookie of the Year Award. There were no winners of the award for several seasons because the team did not have any rookies who could satisfy the conditions to win the award.

Season	Winner
1967–68	Les Binkley
1968–69	Jean Pronovost
1969–70	Michel Briere
1970–71	Greg Polis
1971–72	Dave Burrows
1972–73	No winner
1973–74	Ron Lalonde
1974–75	Pierre Larouche
1975–76	No winner
1976–77	Greg Malone
1977–78	Peter Lee
1978–79	Greg Millen
1978–79	Rod Schutt
1979–80	Paul Marshall
1980–81	Mark Johnson
1981–82	Mike Bullard
1982–83	Dave Hannan
1983–84	Roberto Romano

Season	Winner
1984–85	Mario Lemieux
1985–86	Jim Johnson
1986–87	No winner
1987–88	Rob Brown
1988–89	Zarley Zalapski
1989–90	Mark Recchi
1990–91	Jaromir Jagr
1991–92	Jim Paek
1992–93	Shawn McEachern
1993–94	No winner
1994–95	No winner
1995–96	No winner
1996–97	Patrick Lalime
1997–98	Peter Skudra
1998–99	Jan Hrdina
1999–00	Jean-Sebastien Aubin
2000–01	No winner
2001–02	Johan Hedberg

Season	Winner
2002–03	No winner
2003–04	Ryan Malone
2005–06	Sidney Crosby
2006–07	Evgeni Malkin
2006–07	Jordan Staal
2007–08	Kris Letang
2008–09	No winner
2009–10	No winner
2010–11	Mark Letestu
2011–12	No winner
2012–13	Simon Despres
2013–14	Olli Maatta
2014–15	Derrick Pouliot
2015–16	Bryan Rust
2016–17	Matt Murray
2017–18	No winner
2018–19	No winner

=== Most Valuable Player Award ===
The Most Valuable Player Award is an annual award given to the player or players deemed most valuable to the team. The first winner, following the Penguins first season in the League in 1968, was goaltender Les Binkley. Mario Lemieux was voted team MVP 12 times, between 1985 and 2003. Sidney Crosby has won the award five times and Jaromir Jagr has won the award four times. Jean Pronovost and Evgeni Malkin have each won the award three times, while Dave Burrows, Ron Schock and Ron Francis have each won twice.

The MVP has most frequently been a center, who have been selected 28 times. Eleven wingers have been selected, ten of them right wings. A defenseman was selected six times. Three different goaltenders have also been selected.

Season	Winner
1967–68	Les Binkley
1968–69	Keith McCreary
1969–70	Jean Pronovost
1970–71	Ron Schock
1971–72	Jean Pronovost
1972–73	Dave Burrows
1973–74	Syl Apps, Jr.
1973–74	Dave Burrows
1973–74	Jean Pronovost
1973–74	Lowell MacDonald
1974–75	Ron Schock
1974–75	Ron Stackhouse
1975–76	Pierre Larouche
1976–77	Dunc Wilson
1977–78	Peter Mahovlich
1978–79	Orest Kindrachuk
1978–79	Ron Stackhouse
1979–80	George Ferguson
1980–81	Randy Carlyle

Season	Winner
1981–82	Michel Dion
1982–83	Doug Shedden
1983–84	Mike Bullard
1984–85	Mario Lemieux
1985–86	Mario Lemieux
1986–87	Mario Lemieux
1987–88	Mario Lemieux
1988–89	Mario Lemieux
1989–90	Mario Lemieux
1990–91	Mark Recchi
1991–92	Mario Lemieux
1992–93	Mario Lemieux
1993–94	Ron Francis
1994–95	Jaromir Jagr
1995–96	Mario Lemieux
1996–97	Mario Lemieux
1997–98	Ron Francis
1997–98	Jaromir Jagr
1998–99	Jaromir Jagr

Season	Winner
1999–00	Jaromir Jagr
2000–01	Mario Lemieux
2001–02	Alexei Kovalev
2002–03	Mario Lemieux
2003–04	Dick Tarnstrom
2005–06	Sidney Crosby
2006–07	Sidney Crosby
2007–08	Evgeni Malkin
2008–09	Evgeni Malkin
2009–10	Sidney Crosby
2010–11	Marc-Andre Fleury
2011–12	Evgeni Malkin
2012–13	Sidney Crosby
2013–14	Sidney Crosby
2014–15	Marc-Andre Fleury
2015–16	Sidney Crosby
2016–17	Sidney Crosby
2017–18	Evgeni Malkin
2018–19	Sidney Crosby

=== Players' Player Award ===
The Players' Player Award is an annual award voted on by the players and given to the player who "exemplifies leadership for the team both on and off of the ice, and who is dedicated to teamwork."

Season	Winner
1968–69	Val Fonteyne
1969–70	Dean Prentice
1969–70	Jean Pronovost
1970–71	Jean Pronovost
1971–72	Jean Pronovost
1972–73	Lowell MacDonald
1973–74	Jean Pronovost
1974–75	Ron Schock
1975–76	Jean Pronovost
1976–77	Denis Herron
1977–78	Denis Herron
1978–79	Greg Malone
1979–80	Rick Kehoe
1980–81	Rick Kehoe
1981–82	Mike Bullard
1982–83	Pat Boutette
1983–84	Denis Herron
1984–85	Warren Young

Season	Winner
1985–86	Terry Ruskowski
1986–87	Dan Quinn
1986–87	Terry Ruskowski
1987–88	Mario Lemieux
1988–89	Randy Hillier
1989–90	Randy Hillier
1990–91	Mark Recchi
1991–92	Joe Mullen
1992–93	Mario Lemieux
1993–94	Ron Francis
1994–95	Ron Francis
1995–96	Ron Francis
1996–97	Joe Mullen
1997–98	Ron Francis
1998–99	Jaromir Jagr
1998–99	Martin Straka
1999–00	Martin Straka
2000–01	Martin Straka

Season	Winner
2001–02	Alexei Kovalev
2001–02	Ian Moran
2002–03	No winner
2003–04	Kelly Buchberger
2005–06	John LeClair
2006–07	Mark Recchi
2007–08	Ryan Malone
2008–09	Eric Godard
2009–10	Jordan Staal
2010–11	Brooks Orpik
2011–12	Brooks Orpik
2012–13	Brooks Orpik
2013–14	Brooks Orpik
2014–15	Marc-Andre Fleury
2015–16	Marc-Andre Fleury
2016–17	Marc-Andre Fleury
2017–18	Sidney Crosby
2018–19	Sidney Crosby

=== The Edward J. DeBartolo Community Service Award ===
The Edward J. DeBartolo Community Service Award is an annual award given to the player(s) who have donated a considerable amount of time during the season to working on community and charity projects. It is named in memory of former Penguins owner Edward J. DeBartolo, who owned the team from 1978 to 1991.

Season	Winner
1991–92	Phil Bourque
1991–92	Troy Loney
1992–93	Shawn McEachern
1992–93	Jim Paek
1993–94	Tom Barrasso
1993–94	Ken Wregget
1994–95	Ron Francis
1994–95	Bryan Trottier
1995–96	Dave Roche
1996–97	Joe Dziedzic
1996–97	Chris Tamer
1997–98	Chris Tamer
1997–98	Tyler Wright
1998–99	Rob Brown
1998–99	Tyler Wright

Season	Winner
1999–00	Matthew Barnaby
1999–00	Ian Moran
2000–01	Bob Boughner
2001–02	Andrew Ference
2002–03	Johan Hedberg
2002–03	Steve McKenna
2003–04	Rico Fata
2003–04	Steve McKenna
2005–06	Colby Armstrong
2005–06	Marc-Andre Fleury
2005–06	Ryan Malone
2005–06	Ryan Whitney
2006–07	Mark Recchi
2007–08	Georges Laraque
2008–09	Eric Godard

Season	Winner
2009–10	Sidney Crosby
2010–11	Michael Rupp
2010–11	Maxime Talbot
2011–12	Evgeni Malkin
2012–13	Matt Cooke
2013–14	Marc-Andre Fleury
2014–15	Paul Martin
2015–16	Sidney Crosby
2016–17	Sidney Crosby
2017–18	Matt Murray
2018–19	Matt Murray
2018–19	Bryan Rust

== Defunct team awards ==
=== A. T. Caggiano Memorial Booster Club Award ===
The A. T. Caggiano Memorial Booster Club Award was an annual award given to the player who earned the most votes from Star of the game selections throughout the regular season as voted by Penguins Booster Club members. It was named in memory of longtime Penguins locker room attendant Anthony "A. T." Caggiano.

Season	Winner
1974–75	Vic Hadfield
1975–76	Dave Burrows
1976–77	Dunc Wilson
1977–78	Denis Herron
1978–79	Randy Carlyle
1979–80	George Ferguson
1980–81	Randy Carlyle
1981–82	Michel Dion
1982–83	Michel Dion
1983–84	Mike Bullard
1984–85	Mario Lemieux
1985–86	Mario Lemieux
1986–87	Mario Lemieux
1987–88	Mario Lemieux

Season	Winner
1988–89	Mario Lemieux
1989–90	Mario Lemieux
1990–91	Mark Recchi
1991–92	Mario Lemieux
1992–93	Mario Lemieux
1993–94	Ron Francis
1994–95	Jaromir Jagr
1995–96	Mario Lemieux
1996–97	Mario Lemieux
1997–98	Jaromir Jagr
1998–99	Jaromir Jagr
1999–00	Jean-Sebastien Aubin
2000–01	Alexei Kovalev
2001–02	Alexei Kovalev

Season	Winner
2002–03	Mario Lemieux
2003–04	Ryan Malone
2005–06	Sidney Crosby
2006–07	Sidney Crosby
2007–08	Evgeni Malkin
2008–09	Evgeni Malkin
2009–10	Sidney Crosby
2010–11	Marc-Andre Fleury
2011–12	Evgeni Malkin
2012–13	Sidney Crosby
2012–13	Marc-Andre Fleury
2013–14	Sidney Crosby
2013–14	Marc-Andre Fleury
2014–15	Marc-Andre Fleury

=== Aldege "Baz" Bastien Memorial Good Guy Award ===
The Aldege "Baz" Bastien Memorial Good Guy Award was an annual award given to the player selected by the Pittsburgh chapter of the Professional Hockey Writers Association for his cooperation with the local media. It was named in memory of former Penguins general manager and former player and coach of the AHL's Pittsburgh Hornets, Aldege "Baz" Bastien. The award debuted at the end of the 1983–84 NHL season.

From 1992 to 1996, Molson Breweries sponsored the award, and Disaster Specialists sponsored from 1997 to 1999.

Season	Winner
1983–84	Gary Rissling
1984–85	Gary Rissling
1985–86	Terry Ruskowski
1986–87	Dan Frawley
1987–88	Randy Cunneyworth
1988–89	Jim Johnson
1989–90	Troy Loney
1990–91	Phil Bourque
1991–92	Larry Murphy
1992–93	Kevin Stevens
1993–94	Joe Mullen

Season	Winner
1994–95	Larry Murphy
1995–96	Petr Nedved
1996–97	Ken Wregget
1997–98	Ron Francis
1998–99	Jiri Slegr
1999–00	Rob Brown
2000–01	Alexei Kovalev
2001–02	Johan Hedberg
2002–03	Steve McKenna
2003–04	Brooks Orpik
2005–06	Sidney Crosby

Season	Winner
2006–07	Pittsburgh Penguins team
2007–08	Ryan Whitney
2008–09	Sidney Crosby
2008–09	Brooks Orpik
2009–10	Sidney Crosby
2009–10	Marc-Andre Fleury
2010–11	Michael Rupp
2011–12	Pascal Dupuis
2011–12	Marc-Andre Fleury
2012–13	Matt Niskanen
2013–14	Matt Niskanen

=== Bob Johnson Memorial Badger Bob Award ===
The Bob Johnson Memorial Badger Bob Award was an annual award given to the player who, "through his performance on the ice, his character and total dedication to his teammates for the success of the team, shows that every day is "A Great Day For Hockey."" It was named in memory of "Badger Bob" Johnson, who was the team's head coach during the 1990–91 season. It was last awarded in 2002.

Season	Winner
1994–95	Ron Francis
1994–95	Joe Mullen
1995–96	Jaromir Jagr
1996–97	Joe Mullen
1997–98	Ron Francis

Season	Winner
1998–99	Martin Straka
1999–00	Jiri Slegr
2000–01	Darius Kasparaitis
2000–01	Martin Straka
2001–02	Ian Moran

=== Defensive Player of the Year ===
The Defensive Player of the Year was an annual award given to honor "the defensive skills of an individual player on the team."

Season	Winner
2008–09	Jordan Staal
2009–10	Brooks Orpik
2010–11	Brooks Orpik

Season	Winner
2011–12	Marc-Andre Fleury
2011–12	Brooks Orpik
2012–13	Paul Martin

Season	Winner
2013–14	Matt Niskanen
2014–15	Kris Letang
2015–16	Kris Letang

== Other awards ==
Pittsburgh Penguins who have received non-NHL awards
Award	Description	Winner	Season	References
Best NHL Player ESPY Award	Best NHL player of the last calendar year	Mario Lemieux	1993	
Best NHL Player ESPY Award	Best NHL player of the last calendar year	Mario Lemieux	1994	
Best NHL Player ESPY Award	Best NHL player of the last calendar year	Mario Lemieux	1998	
Best NHL Player ESPY Award	Best NHL player of the last calendar year	Sidney Crosby	2007	
Best NHL Player ESPY Award	Best NHL player of the last calendar year	Sidney Crosby	2008	
Best NHL Player ESPY Award	Best NHL player of the last calendar year	Sidney Crosby	2009	
Best NHL Player ESPY Award	Best NHL player of the last calendar year	Sidney Crosby	2010	
Best NHL Player ESPY Award	Best NHL player of the last calendar year	Sidney Crosby	2013	
Best NHL Player ESPY Award	Best NHL player of the last calendar year	Sidney Crosby	2014	
Best NHL Player ESPY Award	Best NHL player of the last calendar year	Sidney Crosby	2016	
Best NHL Player ESPY Award	Best NHL player of the last calendar year	Sidney Crosby	2017	
Golden Hockey Stick	Best Czech ice hockey player	Jaromir Jagr	1994–95	
Golden Hockey Stick	Best Czech ice hockey player	Jaromir Jagr	1995–96	
Golden Hockey Stick	Best Czech ice hockey player	Jaromir Jagr	1998–99	
Golden Hockey Stick	Best Czech ice hockey player	Jaromir Jagr	1999–2000	
Kharlamov Trophy	Most valuable Russian player in NHL	Evgeni Malkin	2011–12	
Kharlamov Trophy	Most valuable Russian player in NHL	Evgeni Malkin	2016–17	
Lionel Conacher Award	Canada's male athlete of the year	Mario Lemieux	1988	
Lionel Conacher Award	Canada's male athlete of the year	Mario Lemieux	1993	
Lionel Conacher Award	Canada's male athlete of the year	Sidney Crosby	2007	
Lionel Conacher Award	Canada's male athlete of the year	Sidney Crosby	2009	
Lionel Conacher Award	Canada's male athlete of the year	Sidney Crosby	2010	
Lou Marsh Trophy	Canada's top athlete	Mario Lemieux	1993	
Lou Marsh Trophy	Canada's top athlete	Sidney Crosby	2007	
Lou Marsh Trophy	Canada's top athlete	Sidney Crosby	2009	

== See also ==
- List of National Hockey League awards
