= Jim Johnson (ice hockey, born 1962) =

American ice hockey player

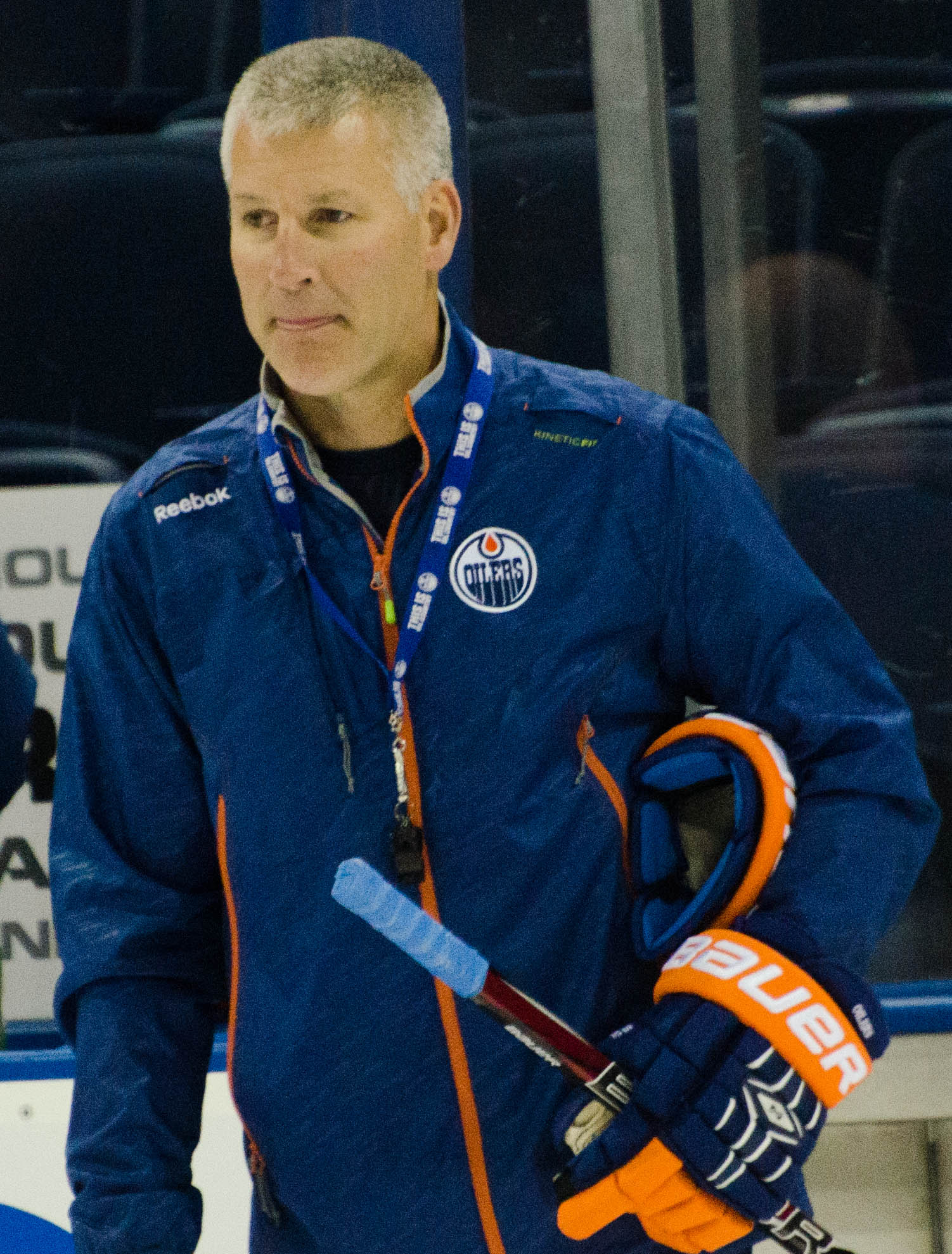
- Johnson in 2015
- Born: August 9, 1962 (age 64) New Hope, Minnesota, U.S.
- Height: 6 ft 1 in (185 cm)
- Weight: 190 lb (86 kg; 13 st 8 lb)
- Position: Defense
- Shot: Left
- Played for: Pittsburgh Penguins; Minnesota North Stars; Dallas Stars; Washington Capitals; Phoenix Coyotes
- National team: United States
- NHL draft: Undrafted
- Playing career: 1985–1998

James Erik Johnson (born August 9, 1962) is an American ice hockey coach and former player, most recently an assistant coach for the San Antonio Rampage. Johnson played junior hockey before playing for University of Minnesota Duluth with Brett Hull in 1984. He graduated from Robbinsdale Cooper High School in 1980. During his career Johnson played for the Pittsburgh Penguins, Minnesota North Stars, Dallas Stars, Washington Capitals and Phoenix Coyotes.

== Career ==
A defenseman, Johnson was signed as a free agent in 1985 by the Pittsburgh Penguins. In 1989 he was awarded the Aldege "Baz" Bastien Memorial Good Guy Award. He played for the Penguins until he was traded early in the 1990–91 NHL season to the Minnesota North Stars. He followed the North Stars franchise when it moved to Dallas in 1993, and played with them until the trade deadline of the 1993–94 NHL season, when he was dealt to the Washington Capitals. Johnson played for two full seasons with the Capitals before signing with the Phoenix Coyotes as a free agent in 1996, and retired two years later. Johnson earned 1-11=12 points in 51 Stanley Cup Playoff games in six postseason appearances. He also represented Team USA at the 1992 Canada Cup and four World Championships (1985, 1986, 1987, 1990). Johnson was selected as an assistant coach for Team USA at three World Junior Championships and served as an assistant coach in the US National Team Development Program from 1999-2002.

After retirement, Johnson became a youth hockey coach in the state of Arizona. In that time he coached the VOSHA (Valley of the Sun Hockey Association) Mustangs to a USA Hockey Amateur National Championship back in 2005. He later became the director of the P.F. Chang's hockey club and partner/co-founder of flexxcoach.com.

On November 29, 2011, Johnson replaced Bob Woods as an assistant coach for the Washington Capitals.

On July 10, 2012, general manager Doug Wilson and head coach Todd McLellan named Johnson an assistant coach for the San Jose Sharks. On April 20, 2015, the team announced fired head coach Todd McLellan, assistant coaches Johnson and Jay Woodcroft, as well as video coordinator Brett Heimlich.

On June 25, 2015, the Edmonton Oilers appointed Johnson and Jay Woodcroft as assistant coaches, rejoining recently hired head coach Todd McLellan in Edmonton. The Oilers relieved Johnson and fellow assistant Ian Herbers of their coaching duties on April 27, 2018.

In 2019, Johnson was hired as an assistant coach with the San Antonio Rampage in the American Hockey League.

In 2022, the Anaheim Ducks named Johnson Director of Player Development.

== Career statistics ==
=== Regular season and playoffs ===
			Regular season					Playoffs
Season	Team	League	GP	G	A	Pts	PIM	GP	G	A	Pts	PIM
1980–81	St. Paul Vulcans	USHL	48	7	25	32	92	6	3	1	4	8
1981–82	University of Minnesota Duluth	WCHA	40	0	10	10	62	—	—	—	—	—
1982–83	University of Minnesota Duluth	WCHA	44	3	18	21	118	—	—	—	—	—
1983–84	University of Minnesota Duluth	WCHA	43	3	13	16	116	—	—	—	—	—
1984–85	University of Minnesota Duluth	WCHA	47	7	29	36	106	—	—	—	—	—
1985–86	Pittsburgh Penguins	NHL	80	3	26	29	115	—	—	—	—	—
1986–87	Pittsburgh Penguins	NHL	80	5	25	30	116	—	—	—	—	—
1987–88	Pittsburgh Penguins	NHL	55	1	12	13	87	—	—	—	—	—
1988–89	Pittsburgh Penguins	NHL	76	2	14	16	163	11	0	5	5	44
1989–90	Pittsburgh Penguins	NHL	75	3	13	16	154	—	—	—	—	—
1990–91	Pittsburgh Penguins	NHL	24	0	5	5	23	—	—	—	—	—
1990–91	Minnesota North Stars	NHL	44	1	9	10	100	14	0	1	1	52
1991–92	Minnesota North Stars	NHL	71	4	10	14	102	7	1	3	4	18
1992–93	Minnesota North Stars	NHL	79	3	20	23	105	—	—	—	—	—
1993–94	Dallas Stars	NHL	53	0	7	7	51	—	—	—	—	—
1993–94	Washington Capitals	NHL	8	0	0	0	12	—	—	—	—	—
1994–95	Washington Capitals	NHL	47	0	13	13	43	7	0	2	2	8
1995–96	Washington Capitals	NHL	66	2	4	6	34	6	0	0	0	6
1996–97	Phoenix Coyotes	NHL	55	3	7	10	74	6	0	0	0	4
1997–98	Phoenix Coyotes	NHL	16	2	1	3	18	—	—	—	—	—
NHL totals			829	29	166	195	1197	51	1	11	12	132

=== International ===
Year	Team	Event	Results	GP	G	A	Pts	PIM
1985	United States	WC	4th	9	0	1	1	22
1986	United States	WC	6th	9	0	0	0	12
1987	United States	WC	7th	10	0	0	0	28
1990	United States	WC	5th	10	0	5	5	16
1991	United States	CC	F	8	0	0	0	20
Senior totals				46	0	6	6	98
