= Bryan Rust =

American ice hockey player (born 1992)

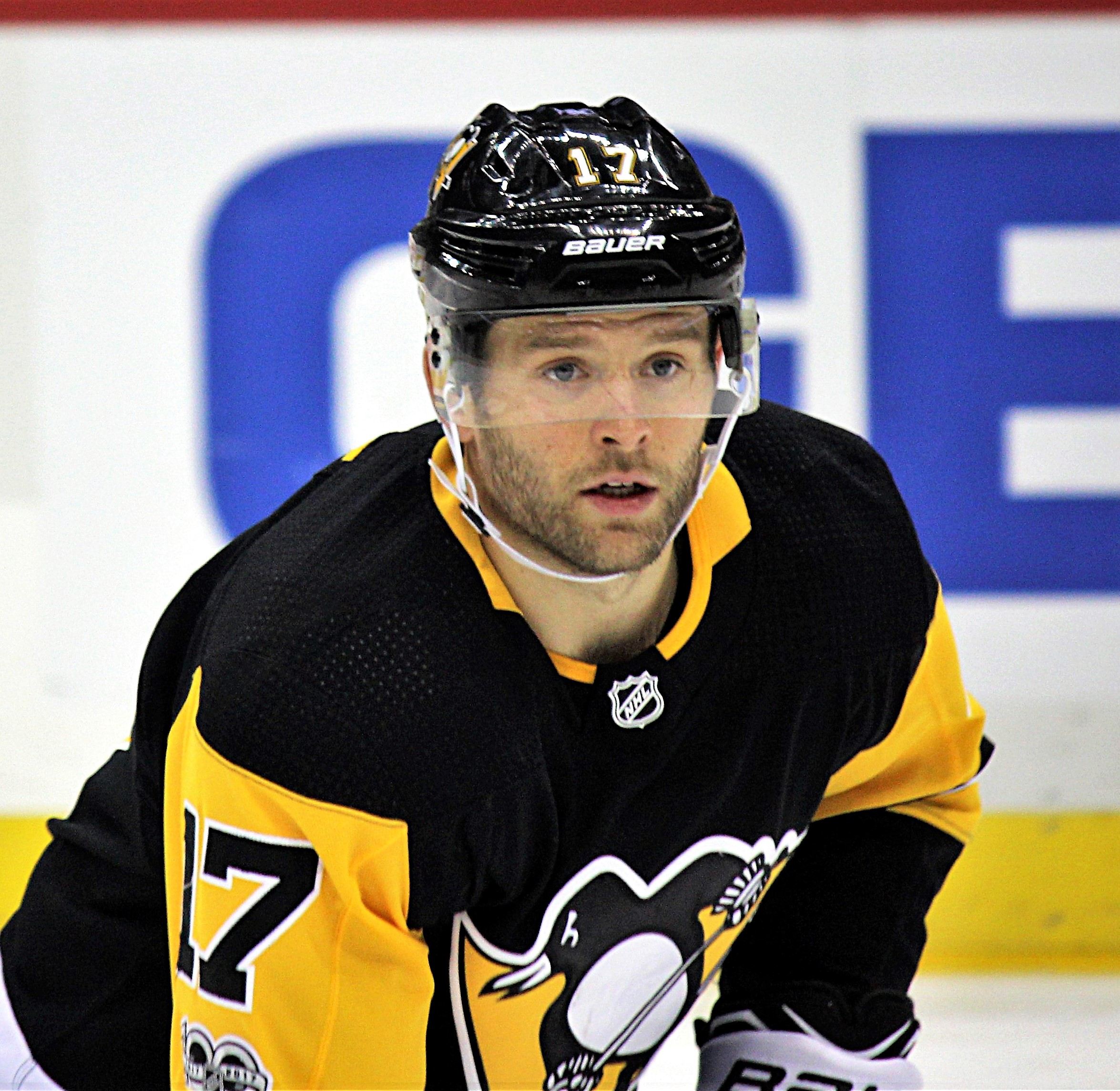
- Rust with the Pittsburgh Penguins in 2017
- Born: May 11, 1992 (age 34) Pontiac, Michigan, U.S.
- Height: 5 ft 11 in (180 cm)
- Weight: 202 lb (92 kg; 14 st 6 lb)
- Position: Right wing
- Shoots: Right
- NHL team: Pittsburgh Penguins
- NHL draft: 80th overall, 2010; Pittsburgh Penguins
- Playing career: 2014–present

Bryan Peter Rust (born May 11, 1992) is an American professional ice hockey player who is a right winger for the Pittsburgh Penguins of the National Hockey League (NHL).

Rust played in the USA Hockey National Team Development Program from 2008 to 2010 before spending four years at the University of Notre Dame. During this time, he was drafted 80th overall by the Penguins in the 2010 NHL entry draft. He won back-to-back Stanley Cup championships with the Penguins in 2016 and 2017 and is the fourth longest tenured member of the organization aside from Sidney Crosby, Evgeni Malkin, and Kris Letang.

== Early life ==
Rust was born on May 11, 1992, in Pontiac, Michigan, U.S. to parents Steve and Betsy. Rust and his older brother Matt were both born with speech impediments and attended speech therapy. Growing up, he was a fan of the Detroit Red Wings and considered Martin Lapointe his favorite player.

== Playing career ==
=== Youth and USNTDP ===
As a youth, Rust played in the 2005 Quebec International Pee-Wee Hockey Tournament with the Detroit Honeybaked minor ice hockey team. In his final season with the Honeybaked 16U AAA team, Rust recorded 40 goals and 65 assists through 68 games. In March 2008, at the age of 16, Rust tried out for the USA Hockey National Team Development Program (USNTDP). After he was rejected due to his underdeveloped skills, Rust worked on his skating abilities after Honeybaked practices with team head coach Larry Knapp. He then attended a second USNTDP's second camp in Rochester, New York and was able to make the team. Although he committed to playing NCAA Division I college hockey for the University of Notre Dame, Rust was also drafted by the Mississauga St. Michael's Majors in the 2008 Ontario Hockey League Selection Draft. Rust chose to attend the University of Notre Dame, in part, due to the influence of his childhood friend, Tony Montagano. Before his death, Montagano would often share stories about the university with Rust. He was also influenced to attend college because he wanted a "degree to fall back on."

=== Collegiate ===
Leading up to the 2010 NHL entry draft, Rust was ranked 76th among all North American skaters by the NHL Central Scouting Bureau. Before starting his freshman season at Notre Dame, Rust was drafted in the third round, 80th overall, by the Pittsburgh Penguins in the 2010 NHL entry draft. In 2020, NHL.com writers wrote up a re-draft of the 2010 draft class and Rust was ranked 20th overall. Following the draft, Rust played for the Notre Dame Fighting Irish men's ice hockey team from 2010 to 2014 while enrolled in their Mendoza College of Business.

Rust made his collegiate debut with the Fighting Irish on October 8, 2010, against the Holy Cross Crusaders. He recorded his first goal on October 10 against Boston University and tallied his first assist shortly thereafter on October 15. Through his first nine games with the Fighting Irish, Rust accumulated one goal, one assist, and two penalty minutes. However, he then suffered a lower-body injury that resulted in him missing a contest against the University of Michigan and his brother. He returned to the Fighting Irish's lineup on November 20 for their game against Michigan State. On December 3, Rust set a new career-high with two goals and three points overall against the Miami RedHawks. Rust finished the regular season with 19 points as he helped the Fighting Irish qualify for the 2011 Frozen Four.

Before the start of the 2011–12 season, Rust was invited to tryout for Team USA's National Junior Evaluation Camp. Rust made an immediate impact for the Fighting Irish once he began his sophomore season by tallying a goal and an assist in his first two games. He quickly accumulated five goals and two assists for seven points through the first 16 games of the season. Rust's early accomplishments were noted by Jackson who said he saw Rust as a possible secondary scorer for the Irish. He finished the regular season with five goals and six assists for 11 points. On March 4, Rust tallied an assist on Anders Lee's second-period goal against Ohio State to advance the Fighting Irish to the second round of the CCHA playoffs. However, this would be his only point of the postseason.

Following his sophomore season, head coach Jeff Jackson privately called out Rust for becoming complacent and neglecting to work hard. As a result, Rust, his brother Matt, and Matt's former teammate worked out at a local gym during the offseason to improve their conditioning. Rust finished his junior season with a career-best 15 goals and 19 assists for 34 points.

Due to the realignment of NCAA conferences, Notre Dame played the 2013–14 season in the Hockey East conference. Before the start of the season, Rust was named an alternate captain with T. J. Tynan and Stephen Johns.

=== Professional ===
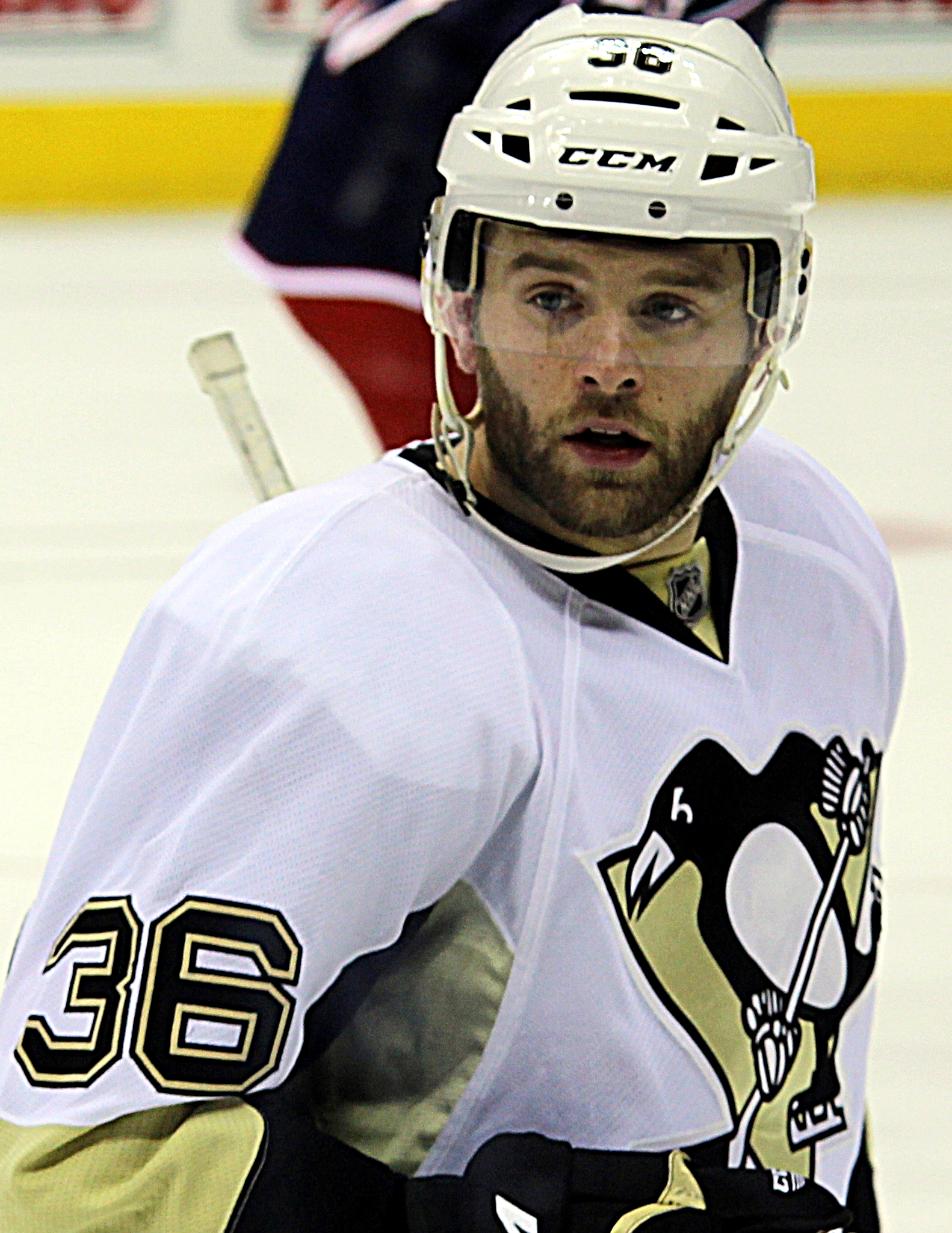
Rust with the Pittsburgh Penguins during a game against the Columbus Blue Jackets in 2014.

Rust officially concluded his collegiate career on April 1, 2014, after signing a two-year entry-level contract with the Pittsburgh Penguins. Upon signing the contract, Rust was assigned to the Penguins American Hockey League (AHL) affiliate, the Wilkes-Barre/Scranton Penguins (WBS Penguins), to conclude the 2013–14 season. He played two regular season games for the WBS Penguins and one playoff game but recorded no points.

After attending the Penguins training camp, Rust was re-assigned to the WBS Penguins to start the 2014–15 season. Rust competed with the Penguins during the preseason and led all team rookies with three goals. This continued into the regular season and Rust quickly found himself on the Penguins top line with Tom Kostopoulos and Nick Drazenovic. Rust remained in the AHL for the first half of the season before earning his first NHL recall on December 4 to replace an injured Scott Wilson. He was returned to the WBS Penguins without making his NHL debut on December 6 and recorded a goal in his first game back. When Rust was recalled again on December 13, he led the WBS Penguins with 10 goals and four assists through 25 games. The recall came at a time when the Penguins were missing numerous key players due to a mumps outbreak. He subsequently made his NHL debut that night against the Columbus Blue Jackets where the Penguins lost in a shootout. He would score his first NHL goal two nights later against Evgeni Nabokov of the Tampa Bay Lightning, on December 15, 2014. After Brian Dumoulin also scored his first NHL goal that night, the two became the first Penguins pair to reach this milestone at the same time since 2006. Rust played 14 games with the Penguins, and spent some time on their top line, before being returned to the AHL on January 14, 2015. Nearly a month following his return, Rust suffered a lower-body injury on February 21 and missed almost six weeks to recover. While he returned from the injury in early April, Rust quickly suffered another injury during a game against the Portland Pirates on April 12. Rust finished the regular season with 13 goals and 14 assists for 27 points but remained sidelined until May 9 when he returned to the WBS Penguins for game three of the Calder Cup playoffs against the Manchester Monarchs. He finished the postseason with two goals through three games.

==== Back-to-back Stanley Cup runs ====
While Rust was assigned to the WBS Penguins to start the 2015–16 season, he became the first player on the team to be recalled to the NHL level. His recall on October 15 came after he tallied one assist through two games. Rust went scoreless through five games with the Penguins before suffering an arm injury on October 24 during a game against the Nashville Predators. He subsequently spent 15 games on the Penguins' injured reserve list before being returned to the AHL on November 30. Upon rejoining the WBS Penguins, Rust returned to full capacity and skated in a team practice for the first time in five weeks. Rust officially returned to the WBS Penguins lineup on December 6. He played in eight games for the WBS Penguins, recording two goals, before being recalled to the NHL level again on December 20. While he was returned by the end of the month, Rust was recalled to the NHL level again on January 7 after adding one goal and two assists to his points total. Rust remained at the NHL level until the team acquired forward Mark Arcobello off waivers from the Predators on January 14. He was recalled to the NHL level shortly thereafter and remained with the Penguins NHL team for the remainder of the season except for a paper transaction to keep him eligible for the AHL postseason. The transaction required Rust to be re-assigned to the AHL for one day before being recalled the next day. After recording eight points in 33 games, including a career-best four points against the New Jersey Devils, Rust signed a two-year contract extension with the Penguins on March 14. Following a lower-body injury at the end of the month, Rust missed the Penguins final few games of the regular season. He subsequently finished the regular season with four goals and seven assists for 11 points through 41 games. He was also named the recipient of the Penguins Michel Brière Rookie of the Year Award.

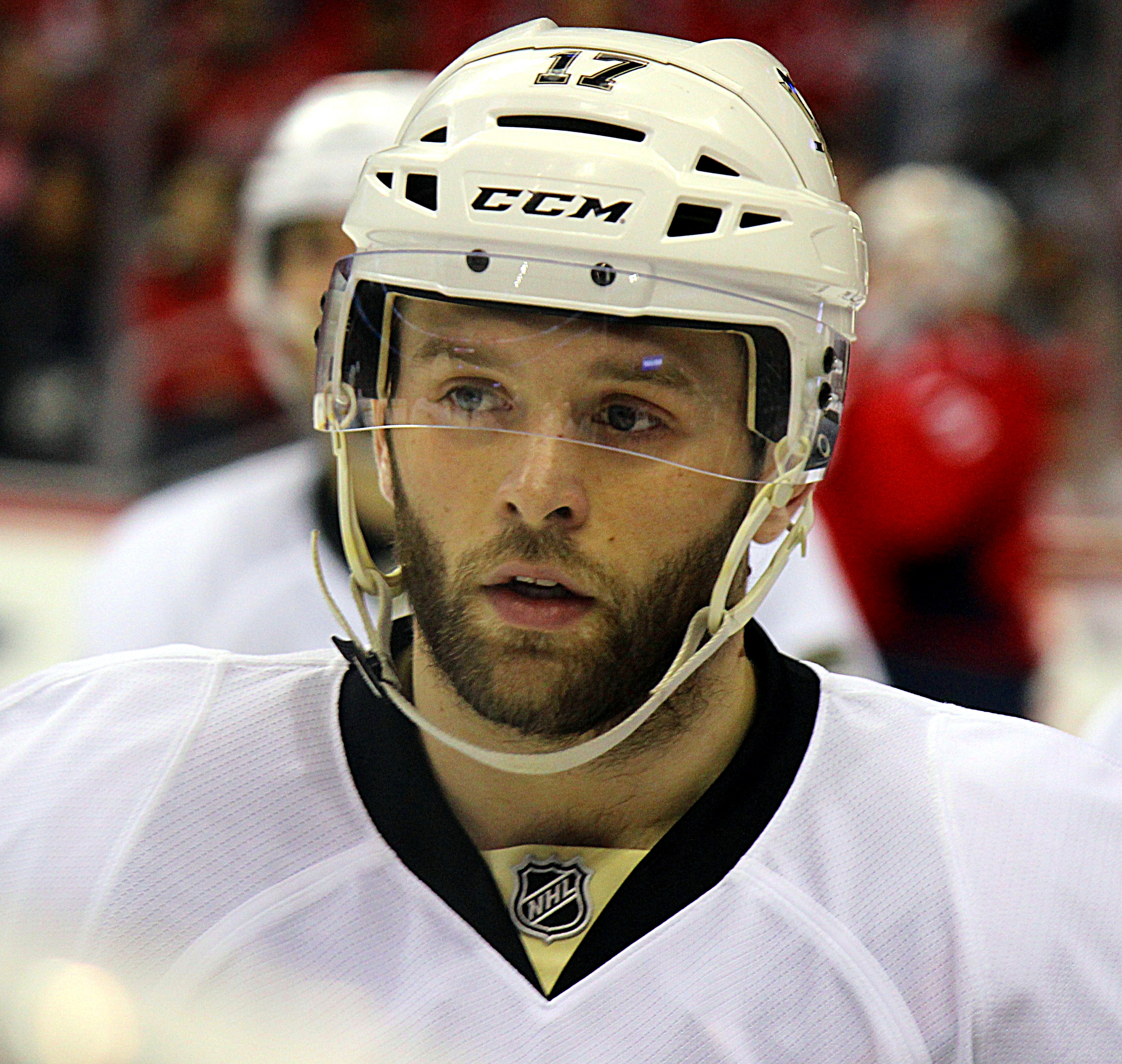
Rust with the Penguins in 2016.

Rust returned to the Penguins lineup for their First Round series against the New York Rangers in the 2016 Stanley Cup playoffs and joined Malkin and Sheary on the third line. In game five, Rust scored two goals and added an assist to help the Penguins record a four-goal second period. His first two goals of the postseason helped the Penguins eliminate the Rangers in five games and advance to the Eastern Conference Second Round. After going goalless in the Penguins second-round series against the Washington Capitals, Rust tied a franchise record in the Eastern Conference Final for most goals scored by a Penguins rookie in the postseason. He recorded three goals during the Penguins series against the Tampa Bay Lightning, including twice in game seven, to lift the Penguins to the 2016 Stanley Cup Final. Rust also became the 8th rookie in NHL history to record multiple goals in a game seven. In game one of the Stanley Cup Final against the San Jose Sharks, Rust scored his sixth goal of the postseason before suffering a hit to the head by Sharks forward Patrick Marleau. While Marleau was assessed a minor penalty, Rust skated for a 35-second shift after the hit before sitting out for the remainder of the game. After undergoing further testing, Rust returned to the Penguins lineup for game two. Rust and Penguins defeated the Sharks in game six of the Stanley Cup Final to win the team's fourth Stanley Cup in franchise history and first since 2009. Rust finished the playoffs with six goals and nine points through 23 games.

Following the Stanley Cup win, it was revealed that Rust had played through a broken finger in game six, but a more complicated injury delayed his return for the 2016–17 season. Rust missed the entirety of the Penguins' preseason games but returned to the team's practice on October 12, 2016. He made his season debut a few days later on October 18 against the Montreal Canadiens. While he was originally expected to play on the right wing of Malkin, he ended up spending most of the season on Nick Bonino's line or with Sidney Crosby and Conor Sheary. On December 5, 2016, Rust recorded his first career hat-trick in an 8–5 win over the Ottawa Senators. While Rust would remain healthy for the first half of the season following his original injury, he missed large parts of the second half of the season due to an injury in February 2017. The injury occurred after he crashed into the net during a game against the Colorado Avalanche on February 9. At the time of the injury, Rust had accumulated 12 goals and 13 assists through 50 games. He subsequently missed 20 games before returning to the Penguins lineup on March 24 against the New York Islanders. Rust returned to the Penguins lineup with nine games remaining in the regular season and finished with 15 goals and 13 assists through 57 games.

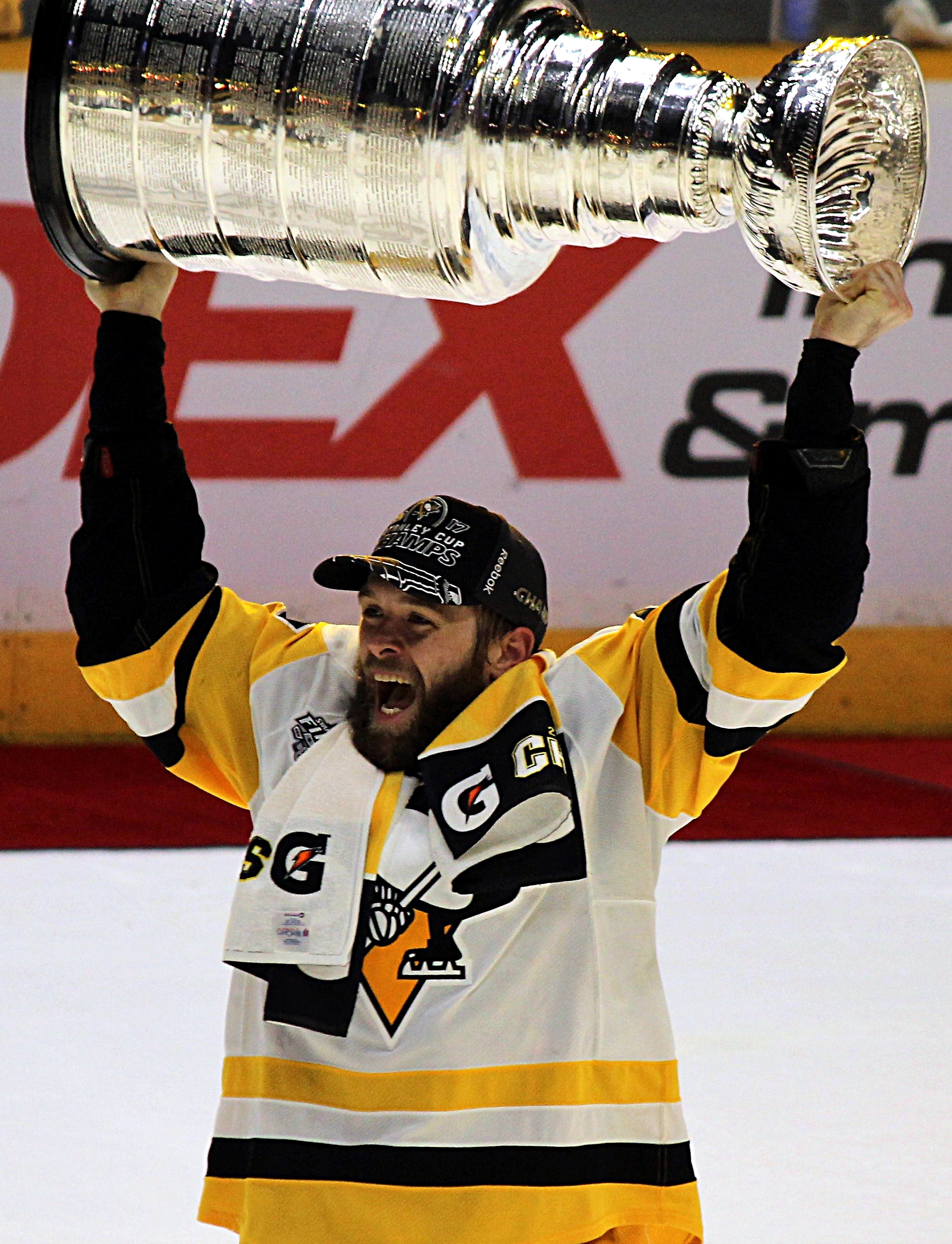
Rust raising his second Stanley Cup with the Penguins in 2017.

During the Penguins' first round series against the Columbus Blue Jackets, Rust joined Malkin and Phil Kessel as linemates on their second line. While playing alongside the two veterans, Rust had recorded three goals on seven shots as the Penguins led the series 3–0. On April 20, Rust scored two pivotal goals, including the game-winner, in game five to lift the Penguins to a series win. Rust continued to score important goals as the Penguins eliminated the Washington Capitals in their second round series. He scored the game-winning goal in game seven to earn the nickname "Mr. Elimination" by Penguins fans and hockey pundits. His momentum would stall during the Penguins Eastern Conference Final series against the Ottawa Senators after he was injured by defenceman Dion Phaneuf in game two. He missed two games to recover before returning to the Penguins lineup for game five. As teammates Conor Sheary and Patric Hörnqvist were out due to an injury, Rust joined Nick Bonino and Carter Rowney on the third line. Rust scored in his return to give the Penguins a 3–2 series lead, and lead them to an eventual series win. While Rust finished the series strong, he struggled during the 2017 Stanley Cup Final against the Nashville Predators. In game four, he earned the opportunity to play with Crosby and Jake Guentzel, but had accumulated only one assist and three shots on goal in four games. His first goal of the series came in game five as he helped give the Penguins a 6–0 shutout and force a game six and push the Predators to elimination. The Penguins would go on to win their second Stanley Cup in as many years the following game.

==== Injuries, COVID-19, and later years ====
As a pending free agent after the 2017–18 season, Rust recorded career highs in assists and points. He began the season with four goals and 18 points through his first 38 games before suffering an injury in late December. After missing nearly a month to recover, Rust made an immediate impact on the lineup by tallying four goals and seven points through his first seven games back. He earned praise from head coach Mike Sullivan who called him a swiss army knife and a versatile player who could play "up and down the lineup.” Although Rust experienced a dip in scoring, he set new career-highs in assists with 25 and points with 38. His efforts helped the Penguins qualify for the 2018 Stanley Cup playoffs, where they would meet the Philadelphia Flyers in the first round. Rust scored three goals during the first-round series, including an empty-net goal in game six, to help the Penguins clinch the series win. After the Penguins fell in the second round to the Washington Capitals, Rust signed a four-year $3.5 million contract extension to remain with the team.

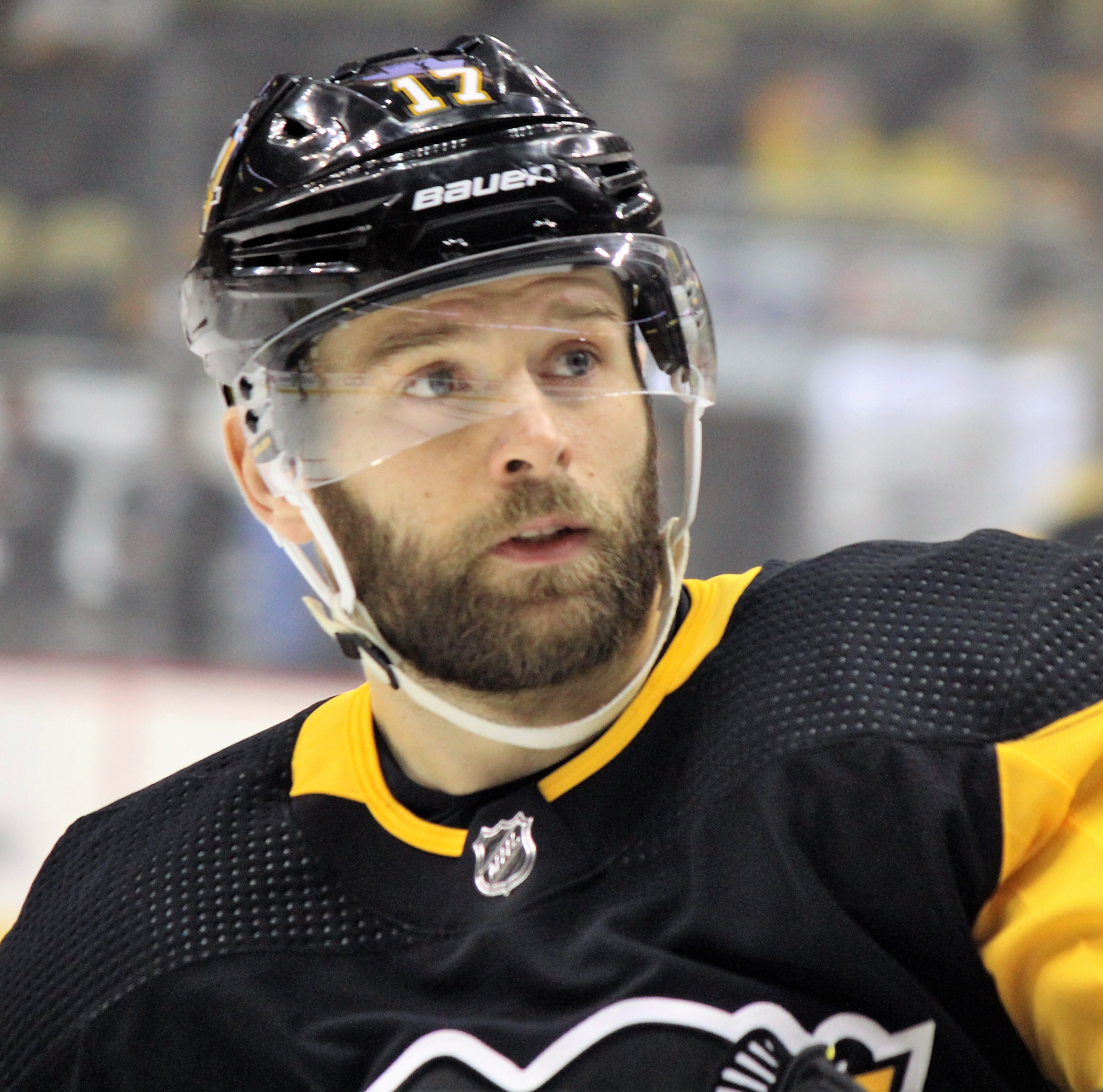
Rust with the Penguins in April 2019.

Rust began the 2018–19 season slowly, scoring only one goal through 29 games and none for 21 consecutive games. He broke this drought on December 12, with a hat-trick in a loss to the Chicago Blackhawks. This hat-trick sparked a resurgence for Rust who added three more goals over seven games before the NHL's Christmas break began. Following the break, Rust suffered a lower-body injury during a game against the St. Louis Blues on December 30. He missed one game to recover before returning to the Penguins lineup on January 2 and contributing to their 7–2 win over the New York Rangers. Rust was limited to only three goals in January but began February with two goals in a 5–3 win over the Ottawa Senators. During this time, Rust often played alongside Phil Kessel and Malkin on the Penguins second line and with Riley Sheahan on the Penguins penalty kill. After Sheahan was traded at the 2019 NHL Trade Deadline, Rust gained Matt Cullen as his new linemate. Despite his slow start, Rust accumulated a career-high 17 goals before suffering a lower-body injury during a game against the Columbus Blue Jackets on February 26. He missed nine games to recover and returned to the Penguins lineup on March 17. He played 19 minutes in his return on the second line with Teddy Blueger and Kessel. Rust and the Penguins met with the New York Islanders in the first round of the 2019 Stanley Cup playoffs but were swept in four games.

Rust began the 2019–20 season on long-term injured reserve after suffering a hand injury during the preseason. Rust was activated off injured reserve on October 26 after missing 11 games. Through the first six games following his return, Rust totalled five goals and two assists for seven points. Rust continued to score throughout November and was eventually promoted to the Penguins' top line with Malkin and Guentzel. Rust had accumulated 17 points through 14 games before suffering an injury in early December. He missed three games before returning to the Penguins top line on December 5 in a game against the Arizona Coyotes. Shortly thereafter, five Penguins players experienced injuries and illnesses that took them out of the lineup. As a result, Rust gained more on-ice responsibility and matched his career-high in power-play goals with four. In Crosby and Guentzel's absences, Rust accumulated 17 goals to help the Penguins finish the month with a 10–2 record. During a game against the Red Wings on January 17, 2020, Rust scored his 20th goal in his 34th game to mark the first 20-goal campaign in his NHL career. By mid-February, Rust had set a new career high and led the team with 23 goals. On March 3, Rust recorded his third career NHL hat-trick to help the Penguins end a six-game losing streak with a 7–3 win against the Ottawa Senators. When the regular-season was paused due to the COVID-19 pandemic on March 12, Rust had accumulated a career high 27 goals and 56 points. During the lockdown, Rust quarantined in Pittsburgh with his wife, brother-in-law, and Penguins teammate Zach Aston-Reese. They rejoined the Penguins when the NHL started its return-to-play initiative for the 2020 Stanley Cup playoffs and played against the Montreal Canadiens in the Eastern Conference Qualifying Round. During the Canadiens four game sweep, Rust remained on the wing of center Evgeni Malkin and contributed one goal and two assists.

As a result of the COVID-19 pandemic, the 2020–21 season was delayed until January 13, 2021, and the regular season was reduced to 56 games. Through the first 11 games of the season, Rust was one of the Penguins most consistent scorers as he tallied two goals and six assists. While he began the season playing on Malkin’s right wing, an injury to Evan Rodrigues in the sixth game of the season resulted in Rust being promoted to Crosby's line. Upon being reunited with Crosby and Guentzel on the Penguins top line, the trio had a dominating start to February. Throughout the first five games of the month, the trio accounted for 40 per cent of all Penguins goals and combined for 16 points. Rust was also named the NHL's Third Star of the Week for the week ending on February 14 after recording three goals and two assists for five points through two games. The Penguins began relying more heavily on the trio in March after four of their forwards suffered injuries. On March 27, Rust recorded his fourth career NHL hat-trick to lift the Penguins 6–3 over the New York Islanders and extend his point streak to six games. On April 9, during a game against the New Jersey Devils, Rust scored two goals to reach 200 career NHL points. This made him the 21st member of the 2010 NHL Draft class to reach this milestone. The following month, Rust scored his 99th and 100th career NHL goals in a game against the Washington Capitals. Rust finished 2020–21 season with 22 goals and 20 assists for 42 points through 56 games as the Penguins finished the regular season as the East Division champions. Due to their first place finish, the Penguins met with the New York Islanders in the 2021 Stanley Cup playoffs East Division First Round. Rust scored two goals and one assist over six games as the Penguins fell to the Islanders.

Rust returned to the Penguins for the 2021–22 season, the final year of his four-year contract. While he originally struggled with scoring due to injuries and COVID-19, Rust finished the season with a career-high 34 assists and 58 points. After recording an empty-net goal in the Penguins' season opener against the Tampa Bay Lightning, Rust suffered a lower body injury the following game on October 14 and missed seven games to recover. While he was recovering, the Penguins earned points in five straight games to start the season with a 3–0–2 record. Rust struggled to score upon his return and experienced a 10-game goalless slump that was snapped on November 24 against the Vancouver Canucks. Two days later, he left warmups early before a game against the New York Islanders and was placed on injured reserve. While this injury resulted in him missing 11 games, Rust made an immediate impact to the lineup upon his return on January 2. During a game against the San Jose Sharks, Rust and Evan Rodrigues each recorded a hat-trick in the third period to lift the Penguins to an 8–5 win. This was the first time since 2008 that the Penguins had two players record hat tricks in a single game. Following the hat-trick, Rust scored four more goals over the next three games before being added to the NHL's COVID-19 protocol list on January 8. He was activated off the protocol list on January 17 after missing four games. In spite of this gap, Rust was named the NHL's Third Star of January after he finished the month with 10 goals and 11 assists through 11 games. Rust finished the 2021–22 season with 24 goals and 34 assists for 58 points. After the Penguins were eliminated from the 2022 Stanley Cup playoffs, Rust signed a six-year $30.75 million extension with the Penguins.

During the first game of the 2023–24 season, Rust and Reilly Smith scored in the first 41 seconds of the third period to become the second-fastest Penguins teammates to score at the start of a period in franchise history. He continued to become one of the Penguins most productive players by tallying nine goals and seven assists through their first 17 games. He missed three games with a lower-body injury in late November but quickly tallied one goal and three assists in his first five games back. On December 6, Rust suffered an upper-body injury during a loss to the Tampa Bay Lightning and was expected to miss at least a week to recover.

On December 12, 2024, Rust recorded his sixth career hat-trick and added an assist in a 9–2 win over the Montreal Canadiens. After recording three goals over four games to start February, Rust suffered a lower-body injury during a game against the Anaheim Ducks. He was activated off injured reserve on February 25 and returned to the Penguins lineup that night against the Philadelphia Flyers.

On January 25, 2026, Rust delivered an illegal check to the head of Brock Boeser and received a three-game suspension. On April 5, 2026, Rust recorded an assist and a goal in a 5–2 win against the Florida Panthers. His assist on a Sidney Crosby goal in the first period was Rust's 500th career NHL point.

== Personal life ==
Rust's older brother Matt also played professional ice hockey and last played for the Wilkes-Barre Scranton Penguins during the 2011–12 AHL season. His older sister Erika is a high school English teacher and women’s soccer coach.

Rust met his wife Kelsey Burton in 2016 through mutual friends and the two were married on July 13, 2019, in Michigan. As of April 2025, they have two sons and one daughter together.

== Career statistics ==
=== Regular season and playoffs ===
			Regular season					Playoffs
Season	Team	League	GP	G	A	Pts	PIM	GP	G	A	Pts	PIM
2008–09	U.S. NTDP U17	USDP	25	3	4	7	8	—	—	—	—	—
2008–09	U.S. NTDP U18	NAHL	42	6	9	15	18	9	0	2	2	4
2009–10	U.S. NTDP Juniors	USHL	27	10	13	23	6	—	—	—	—	—
2009–10	U.S. NTDP U17	USDP	1	0	0	0	0	—	—	—	—	—
2009–10	U.S. NTDP U18	USDP	65	26	26	52	24	—	—	—	—	—
2010–11	University of Notre Dame	CCHA	40	6	13	19	4	—	—	—	—	—
2011–12	University of Notre Dame	CCHA	40	5	6	11	14	—	—	—	—	—
2012–13	University of Notre Dame	CCHA	41	15	19	34	4	—	—	—	—	—
2013–14	University of Notre Dame	HE	40	17	16	33	12	—	—	—	—	—
2013–14	Wilkes-Barre/Scranton Penguins	AHL	2	0	0	0	0	1	0	0	0	0
2014–15	Wilkes-Barre/Scranton Penguins	AHL	45	13	14	27	14	3	2	0	2	0
2014–15	Pittsburgh Penguins	NHL	14	1	1	2	4	—	—	—	—	—
2015–16	Wilkes-Barre/Scranton Penguins	AHL	16	3	3	6	2	—	—	—	—	—
2015–16	Pittsburgh Penguins	NHL	41	4	7	11	12	23	6	3	9	6
2016–17	Pittsburgh Penguins	NHL	57	15	13	28	8	23	7	2	9	10
2017–18	Pittsburgh Penguins	NHL	69	13	25	38	26	12	3	0	3	4
2018–19	Pittsburgh Penguins	NHL	72	18	17	35	24	4	0	0	0	2
2019–20	Pittsburgh Penguins	NHL	55	27	29	56	30	4	1	2	3	2
2020–21	Pittsburgh Penguins	NHL	56	22	20	42	18	6	2	1	3	4
2021–22	Pittsburgh Penguins	NHL	60	24	34	58	14	7	2	6	8	4
2022–23	Pittsburgh Penguins	NHL	81	20	26	46	31	—	—	—	—	—
2023–24	Pittsburgh Penguins	NHL	62	28	28	56	20	—	—	—	—	—
2024–25	Pittsburgh Penguins	NHL	71	31	34	65	18	—	—	—	—	—
2025–26	Pittsburgh Penguins	NHL	72	29	36	65	26	6	1	1	2	4
NHL totals			710	232	270	502	231	85	22	15	37	36

Medal record

Men's ice hockey

Representing United States

World Junior U18 Championships
Gold medal – first place	2010 Belarus	

=== International ===
Year	Team	Event	Result	GP	G	A	Pts	PIM
2009	United States	U17	3rd place, bronze medalist(s)	6	1	1	2	2
2010	United States	U18	1st place, gold medalist(s)	7	4	2	6	4
Junior totals				13	5	3	8	6

== Awards and honors ==
Awards	Year	Ref
College
CCHA Tournament Champion	2013	
NHL
Stanley Cup champion	2016, 2017	
Pittsburgh Penguins
Michel Brière Rookie of the Year Award	2016	
