= Gary Rissling =

Canadian ice hockey player

- Born: August 8, 1956 (age 68); Saskatoon, Saskatchewan, Canada
- Height: 5 ft 9 in (175 cm)
- Weight: 175 lb (79 kg; 12 st 7 lb)
- Position: Left wing
- Shot: Left
- Played for: Washington Capitals; Pittsburgh Penguins
- NHL draft: Undrafted
- Playing career: 1977–1987

Gary Daniel Rissling (born August 8, 1956) is a Canadian former professional ice hockey player who played in the National Hockey League for the Washington Capitals and Pittsburgh Penguins between 1979 and 1985. Originally signed in 1978 as a free agent by Washington, Rissling played there until 1980 when he joined Pittsburgh. In 1983 and 1984 he was awarded the Aldege "Baz" Bastien Memorial Good Guy Award in the American Hockey League.

Rissling was born in Saskatoon, Saskatchewan.

== Career statistics ==
=== Regular season and playoffs ===
			Regular season					Playoffs
Season	Team	League	GP	G	A	Pts	PIM	GP	G	A	Pts	PIM
1973–74	Spruce Grove Mets	AJHL	48	29	27	56	149	—	—	—	—	—
1974–75	Spruce Grove Mets	AJHL	5	2	2	4	2	—	—	—	—	—
1974–75	Edmonton Oil Kings	WCHL	69	19	35	54	228	—	—	—	—	—
1975–76	Edmonton Oil Kings	WCHL	18	5	9	14	25	—	—	—	—	—
1975–76	Calgary Centennials	WCHL	47	29	38	67	196	—	—	—	—	—
1976–77	Calgary Centennials	WCHL	68	40	49	89	317	9	9	7	16	12
1977–78	Port Huron Flags	IHL	79	29	34	63	341	17	7	10	17	131
1978–79	Hershey Bears	AHL	52	14	20	34	337	4	0	0	0	18
1978–79	Washington Capitals	NHL	26	3	3	6	127	—	—	—	—	—
1979–80	Hershey Bears	AHL	46	16	24	40	279	14	3	5	8	87
1979–80	Washington Capitals	NHL	11	0	1	1	49	—	—	—	—	—
1980–81	Birmingham Bulls	CHL	19	5	7	12	161	—	—	—	—	—
1980–81	Hershey Bears	AHL	4	1	1	2	74	—	—	—	—	—
1980–81	Pittsburgh Penguins	NHL	25	1	0	1	143	5	0	1	1	4
1981–82	Erie Blades	AHL	29	7	15	22	185	—	—	—	—	—
1981–82	Pittsburgh Penguins	NHL	16	0	0	0	55	—	—	—	—	—
1982–83	Baltimore Skipjacks	AHL	38	14	17	31	136	—	—	—	—	—
1982–83	Pittsburgh Penguins	NHL	40	5	4	9	128	—	—	—	—	—
1983–84	Baltimore Skipjacks	AHL	30	12	13	25	47	—	—	—	—	—
1983–84	Pittsburgh Penguins	NHL	47	4	13	17	297	—	—	—	—	—
1984–85	Baltimore Skipjacks	AHL	22	9	17	26	60	—	—	—	—	—
1984–85	Pittsburgh Penguins	NHL	56	10	9	19	207	—	—	—	—	—
1985–86	Baltimore Skipjacks	AHL	76	19	34	53	340	—	—	—	—	—
1986–87	Baltimore Skipjacks	AHL	66	15	23	38	285	—	—	—	—	—
NHL totals			221	23	30	53	1,006	5	0	1	1	4
