= Michel Brière =

Canadian ice hockey player (1949–1971)

- Born: October 21, 1949 Malartic, Quebec, Canada
- Died: April 13, 1971 (aged 21) Montreal, Quebec, Canada
- Height: 5 ft 10 in (178 cm)
- Weight: 165 lb (75 kg; 11 st 11 lb)
- Position: Centre
- Shot: Left
- Played for: Pittsburgh Penguins
- NHL draft: 26th overall, 1969; Pittsburgh Penguins
- Playing career: 1969–1970

Michel Edouard Brière (October 21, 1949 – April 13, 1971) was a Canadian professional ice hockey player for one season in the National Hockey League (NHL) with the Pittsburgh Penguins in 1969–70. Following his rookie season with the Penguins, Brière was involved in a car accident in which he suffered major head trauma. After multiple brain surgeries and 11 months in a coma, he died as a result of his injuries at the age of 21.

== Playing career ==
Brière was selected by the Pittsburgh Penguins in the third round of the 1969 NHL Amateur Draft. During his junior career with the Shawinigan Bruins, he scored 129 goals and 191 assists, for 320 points in 100 games. In his last season with Shawinigan in 1968–69 he finished third on the team in scoring. According to the Penguins' general manager Jack Riley, during the contract negotiations with Brière prior to the 1969–70 season "He asked for a bigger bonus and said, 'It's not really that much extra money, because I'll be playing for the Penguins for the next 20 years..."

On November 1, 1969, Brière scored his first NHL goal against the Minnesota North Stars' goaltender Ken Broderick. He would go on to score 12 goals and 32 assists, to finish third in the team scoring with 44 points.

During the quarterfinals of the Stanley Cup playoffs, Brière scored the first overtime goal in Penguins' history on April 12, 1970, by scoring the game-winner, and series clincher, against the Oakland Seals at the Oakland-Alameda County Coliseum Arena. The sweep of the Seals was also the first playoff series victory for the Penguins' franchise.

While Brière helped lead the Penguins to the second round of the NHL playoffs, the team finished two victories short of the Stanley Cup Finals, by losing to the St. Louis Blues in the semifinals. During the playoffs, Brière led the team in scoring with eight points, which included five goals and three assists. Three of his five goals were game-winners.

Despite being named the Penguins' rookie of the year, Brière received no votes for the Calder Memorial Trophy, which was won by the Chicago Black Hawks' goaltender Tony Esposito. At this time, many scouts were predicting that Brière would develop into a top NHL player. Brière drew comparisons to Phil Esposito and Bobby Clarke, both of whom were later inducted into the Hockey Hall of Fame.

== Death ==
Brière's retired #21 hanging above the scoreboard at Mellon Arena, next to Mario Lemieux's retired #66, in December 2009.

After the playoffs, Brière returned to Quebec to marry his childhood sweetheart Michèle Beaudoin, with whom he had a son, Martin. They were to be married on June 6, 1970. However, on the evening of May 15, 1970, Brière was involved in a single-car crash with two friends, Renald Bilodeau and Yvon Fortin. Despite the road being clear and in daylight, the vehicle failed to negotiate a curve. Longstanding rumours that Brière was behind the wheel were confirmed in 2021. He insisted on driving after drinking alcohol. While his companions suffered relatively minor injuries, Brière, the driver, was ejected from his orange 1970 Mercury Cougar along Route 117 near Val-d'Or, 70 miles from his hometown of Malartic. The ambulance transporting him to the hospital in Val-d'Or struck and killed an 18-year-old cyclist, Raymond Perreault, a friend of Brière. Suffering from major head trauma, Brière was flown 300 miles to Notre Dame Hospital in Montreal, where a leading neurosurgeon performed the first of four brain surgeries. Brière was initially given a somewhat optimistic prognosis that gave him a 50–50 chance of living.

Brière was transferred to Montreal's Marie-Clarac Rehabilitation Hospital on March 27, 1971. The Penguins finished the regular season at home on April 4, 1971, and missed the playoffs. Nine days later, after 11 months in a coma, Brière died at 4:20 p.m. Six members of the Penguins, including general manager Jack Riley, equipment manager Ken Carson and coach Red Kelly, attended the funeral outside Montreal. A memorial service was held in St. Paul Cathedral in Pittsburgh, in which most of the team officials and some players attended.

== Legacy ==
Brière's retired #21 hanging above the scoreboard at the then-Consol Energy Center next to Mario Lemieux's retired #66, in December 2010.

While Brière was hospitalized, the Penguins started pre-season conditioning near Brantford. Then-trainer Ken Carson added Brière's name to the back of a jersey, which, along with Brière's equipment bag, traveled with the team for their entire 1970–71 season.

Brière's number 21 was not retired immediately by the team, but no one ever wore it again. A framed jersey hung with his photo in the Igloo Club, located inside the Pittsburgh Civic Arena, as the only visible sign that the number was retired. According to Carson, "No one ever asked to wear that number (21). If they had, I would have told them Mike's story." Brière's number was officially retired on January 5, 2001, nine days after Penguins' co-owner Mario Lemieux came out of retirement to once again wear his number 66. Through 2025, Brière was one of three players in Penguins history whose numbers were retired.

The Quebec Major Junior Hockey League renamed its MVP award the Michel Brière Memorial Trophy in 1972. The Pittsburgh Penguins also present the Michel Brière Rookie of the Year Award annually to the season's best rookie player.

== Career statistics ==
=== Regular season and playoffs ===
			Regular season					Playoffs
Season	Team	League	GP	G	A	Pts	PIM	GP	G	A	Pts	PIM
1964–65	Malartic National	QNWJHL	24	26	30	56	18	—	—	—	—	—
1965–66	Malartic National	QNWJHL	24	31	43	74	38	—	—	—	—	—
1967–68	Shawinigan Bruins	QJAHL	50	54	105	159	—	12	11	16	27	8
1968–69	Shawinigan Bruins	QJAHL	50	75	86	161	31	—	—	—	—	—
1969–70	Pittsburgh Penguins	NHL	76	12	32	44	20	10	5	3	8	17
NHL totals			76	12	32	44	20	10	5	3	8	17

== See also ==
- List of ice hockey players who died during their careers
