= Shane Endicott =

Canadian ice hockey player

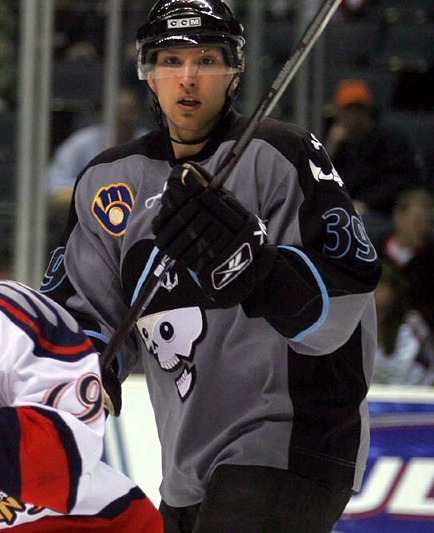
- Endicott with the Milwaukee Admirals in 2006
- Born: December 21, 1981 (age 44) Saskatoon, Saskatchewan, Canada
- Height: 6 ft 3 in (191 cm)
- Weight: 214 lb (97 kg; 15 st 4 lb)
- Position: Centre
- Shot: Left
- Played for: Pittsburgh Penguins
- NHL draft: 52nd overall, 2000; Pittsburgh Penguins
- Playing career: 2001–2011

Shane Murray Endicott (born December 21, 1981) is a Canadian former professional ice hockey centre who played 45 games in the National Hockey League for the Pittsburgh Penguins.

== Playing career ==
Endicott was drafted 52nd overall in the 2000 NHL entry draft by the Pittsburgh Penguins from the Seattle Thunderbirds of the Western Hockey League. He made his NHL debut directly from the Thunderbirds, playing in 4 games with the Penguins in the 2001–02 season before being sent to the Penguins' affiliate, the Wilkes-Barre/Scranton Penguins.

Endicott spent the next four years primarily playing for Wilkes-Barre/Scranton. In the 2005–06 season, Shane played 41 games in the NHL recording 1 goals and 1 assist. At the conclusion of the season, Endicott was bought-out from the final year of his contract with the Penguins.

On July 17, 2006, Endicott signed as a free agent with the Nashville Predators and was assigned to their affiliate, the Milwaukee Admirals. On January 26, 2007, Endicott was traded to the Anaheim Ducks for Chris Durno. Endicott's tenure with the Ducks was cut short on February 23, 2007, when he was traded to the Dallas Stars for future considerations. During this turbulent season, Endicott posted 5 goals and 10 assists in 56 games split between Milwaukee, Portland and Iowa.

On August 21, 2010, Endicott signed as a free agent from EVR Tower Stars of the German 2nd Bundesliga to a one-year contract with Italian team SG Pontebba.

== Career statistics ==
			Regular season					Playoffs
Season	Team	League	GP	G	A	Pts	PIM	GP	G	A	Pts	PIM
1996–97	Saskatoon Contacts AAA	SMHL	43	13	14	27	49	3	2	1	3	2
1997–98	Saskatoon Contacts AAA	SMHL	43	31	32	63	42	—	—	—	—	—
1997–98	Seattle Thunderbirds	WHL	—	—	—	—	—	5	0	0	0	0
1998–99	Seattle Thunderbirds	WHL	72	13	26	39	27	11	0	1	1	0
1999–00	Seattle Thunderbirds	WHL	70	23	32	55	62	7	1	6	7	6
2000–01	Seattle Thunderbirds	WHL	72	36	43	79	86	9	4	5	9	12
2001–02	Pittsburgh Penguins	NHL	4	0	1	1	4	—	—	—	—	—
2001–02	Wilkes–Barre/Scranton Penguins	AHL	63	19	20	39	46	—	—	—	—	—
2002–03	Wilkes–Barre/Scranton Penguins	AHL	74	13	26	39	68	6	0	2	2	4
2003–04	Wilkes–Barre/Scranton Penguins	AHL	79	17	22	39	68	24	8	4	12	26
2004–05	Wilkes–Barre/Scranton Penguins	AHL	68	24	23	47	89	11	2	2	4	31
2005–06	Pittsburgh Penguins	NHL	41	1	1	2	43	—	—	—	—	—
2005–06	Wilkes–Barre/Scranton Penguins	AHL	8	0	2	2	4	10	1	3	4	2
2006–07	Milwaukee Admirals	AHL	26	1	2	3	18	—	—	—	—	—
2006–07	Portland Pirates	AHL	9	1	2	3	4	—	—	—	—	—
2006–07	Iowa Stars	AHL	21	3	6	9	12	5	1	1	2	0
2007–08	Oji Eagles	ALH	30	13	22	35	71	9	6	5	11	16
2008–09	Oji Eagles	ALH	36	26	23	49	55	4	0	1	1	35
2009–10	EVR Tower Stars	GER-2	43	14	29	43	80	10	3	7	10	37
2010–11	SG Pontebba	ITA	40	13	26	39	32	4	0	1	1	0
AHL totals			348	78	103	181	309	56	12	12	24	39
NHL totals			45	1	2	3	47	—	—	—	—	—
