= Martin Straka =

Czech ice hockey player and entrepreneur

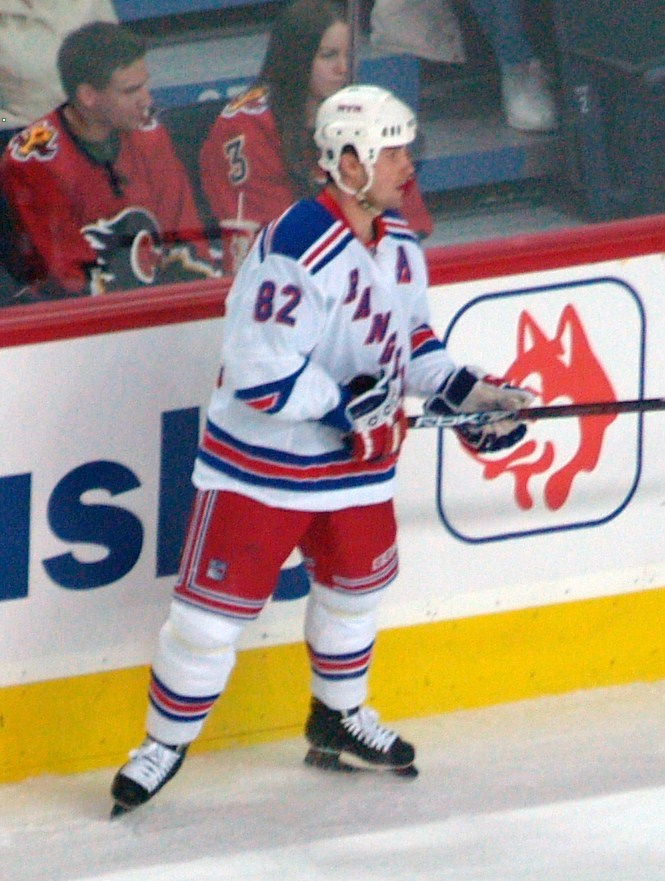
- Straka with the New York Rangers in 2008
- Born: September 3, 1972 (age 54) Plzeň, Czechoslovakia
- Height: 5 ft 9 in (175 cm)
- Weight: 180 lb (82 kg; 12 st 12 lb)
- Position: Forward
- Shot: Left
- Played for: Pittsburgh Penguins; Ottawa Senators; New York Islanders; Florida Panthers; Los Angeles Kings; New York Rangers; HC Plzeň 1929
- National team: Czech Republic
- NHL draft: 19th overall, 1992; Pittsburgh Penguins
- Playing career: 1989–2014

Martin Straka (born September 3, 1972) is a Czech former ice hockey center who most recently played for HC Plzeň 1929 of the Czech Extraliga. He is also the club's general manager and co-owner, having bought a 70% share of the team in 2009. Straka played in the National Hockey League (NHL) from 1992 until 2008 with the Pittsburgh Penguins, Ottawa Senators, New York Islanders, Florida Panthers, Los Angeles Kings and New York Rangers.

== Playing career ==
Straka was drafted 19th overall by the Penguins in the 1992 NHL entry draft, and played for several teams throughout his 15-year NHL career. After a productive first full season with the Penguins, the shortened 1994–95 season saw him produce only four goals and 16 points in 31 games, after which Straka was traded to the Ottawa Senators on April 7, 1995, for Norm MacIver and Troy Murray. The following season, on January 23, 1996, less than a year after being traded to Ottawa, he was traded again. Straka was traded to the New York Islanders in a three-way, five-player deal between Ottawa, New York and the Toronto Maple Leafs, involving Straka, Kirk Muller, Ken Belanger, Don Beaupre, Bryan Berard, Damian Rhodes and Wade Redden. He was later placed on waivers and claimed by the Florida Panthers on March 15, 1996. Florida did not re-sign Straka after the 1996–97 season, making him an unrestricted free agent. He then returned to Pittsburgh beginning in 1997–98.

In 1998–99, he set new career highs, recording 35 goals and 48 assists. His second season was less successful, but he had established himself as one of the league's premier two-way players due to his speed and on-ice vision. With the return of Mario Lemieux, he went on to have a career year during the 2000–01 season for Pittsburgh, amassing 27 goals and 95 points in 82 games.

In the 2001–02 season, his reputation for speed was affected by a season-ending injury in the form of a broken leg, from which it took him years to fully recover. On November 30, 2003, in a cost-cutting move, the Penguins dealt Straka to the Los Angeles Kings for Russian prospect Sergei Anshakov and defenceman Martin Strbak. Straka later signed as a free agent with the Rangers on August 2, 2005, and went on to have two productive 70-point seasons. On January 17, 2007, despite reports that he was considering retirement, Straka signed a one-year contract extension for the 2007–08 season.

On February 16, 2008, in a game against the Buffalo Sabres, Straka assisted on a goal to record his 700th NHL point.

He was a part of the gold medal-winning Olympic team at the 1998 Winter Olympics in Nagano. He also won gold in the 2005 Men's World Ice Hockey Championships in Vienna.

In July 2008, Straka returned home to the Czech Extraliga, signing a one-year deal with HC Lasselsberger Plzeň (now HC Plzeň 1929).

In the 2012–13 season, he won with HC Škoda Plzeň Czech Extraliga title. He scored a winning goal in 7th final play-off game versus PSG Zlín in second overtime.

On March 28, 2014, Straka announced his retirement from professional hockey.

== Career statistics ==
=== Regular season and playoffs ===
			Regular season					Playoffs
Season	Team	League	GP	G	A	Pts	PIM	GP	G	A	Pts	PIM
1988–89	TJ Škoda Plzeň	CSSR U18	34	37	34	71	42	—	—	—	—	—
1989–90	TJ Škoda Plzeň	CSSR	1	0	3	3	—	—	—	—	—	—
1990–91	HC Škoda Plzeň	CSSR	47	7	24	31	6	—	—	—	—	—
1991–92	HC Škoda Plzeň	CSSR	50	27	28	55	20	14	4	4	8	—
1992–93	Cleveland Lumberjacks	IHL	4	4	3	7	0	—	—	—	—	—
1992–93	Pittsburgh Penguins	NHL	42	3	13	16	29	11	2	1	3	2
1993–94	Pittsburgh Penguins	NHL	84	30	34	64	24	6	1	0	1	2
1994–95	HC Interconnex Plzeň	CZE	19	10	11	21	18	—	—	—	—	—
1994–95	Pittsburgh Penguins	NHL	31	4	12	16	16	—	—	—	—	—
1994–95	Ottawa Senators	NHL	6	1	1	2	0	—	—	—	—	—
1995–96	Ottawa Senators	NHL	43	9	16	25	29	—	—	—	—	—
1995–96	New York Islanders	NHL	22	2	10	12	6	—	—	—	—	—
1995–96	Florida Panthers	NHL	12	2	4	6	6	13	2	2	4	2
1996–97	Florida Panthers	NHL	55	7	22	29	12	4	0	0	0	0
1997–98	Pittsburgh Penguins	NHL	75	19	23	42	28	6	2	0	2	2
1998–99	Pittsburgh Penguins	NHL	80	35	48	83	26	13	6	9	15	6
1999–00	Pittsburgh Penguins	NHL	71	20	39	59	26	11	3	9	12	10
2000–01	Pittsburgh Penguins	NHL	82	27	68	95	38	18	5	8	13	8
2001–02	Pittsburgh Penguins	NHL	13	5	4	9	0	—	—	—	—	—
2002–03	Pittsburgh Penguins	NHL	60	18	28	46	12	—	—	—	—	—
2003–04	Pittsburgh Penguins	NHL	22	4	8	12	16	—	—	—	—	—
2003–04	Los Angeles Kings	NHL	32	6	8	14	4	—	—	—	—	—
2004–05	HC Lasselsberger Plzeň	CZE	45	16	18	34	76	—	—	—	—	—
2005–06	New York Rangers	NHL	82	22	54	76	42	4	0	0	0	2
2006–07	New York Rangers	NHL	76	29	41	70	24	10	2	8	10	2
2007–08	New York Rangers	NHL	65	14	27	41	22	10	3	7	10	16
2008–09	HC Lasselsberger Plzeň	CZE	51	22	30	52	20	17	8	13	21	2
2009–10	HC Plzeň 1929	CZE	35	17	26	43	32	6	2	2	4	4
2010–11	HC Plzeň 1929	CZE	51	17	44	61	12	4	3	2	5	0
2011–12	HC Plzeň 1929	CZE	51	17	30	47	20	12	2	11	13	4
2012–13	HC Škoda Plzeň	CZE	47	15	39	54	18	20	8	12	20	8
CZE totals			299	114	198	312	196	59	23	40	63	18
NHL totals			954	257	460	717	360	106	26	44	70	52

=== International ===
Medal record

Men's ice hockey

Representing Czech Republic

Olympic Games
Gold medal – first place	1998 Nagano	Team
Bronze medal – third place	2006 Turin	Team

World Championships
Gold medal – first place	2005 Vienna	Team

Year	Team	Event	GP	G	A	Pts	PIM
1990	Czechoslovakia	EJC	6	4	2	6	2
1991	Czechoslovakia	WJC	6	1	5	6	0
1992	Czechoslovakia	WJC	7	2	6	8	4
1994	Czech Republic	WC	3	1	0	1	4
1996	Czech Republic	WCH	1	0	0	0	0
1998	Czech Republic	OG	6	1	2	3	0
2003	Czech Republic	WC	9	6	4	10	4
2004	Czech Republic	WC	7	2	2	4	4
2004	Czech Republic	WCH	5	1	2	3	0
2005	Czech Republic	WC	9	3	1	4	8
2006	Czech Republic	OG	8	2	6	8	6
Junior totals			19	7	13	20	6
Senior totals			48	16	17	33	26

Preceded by Markus Näslund	Pittsburgh Penguins first-round draft pick 1992	Succeeded by Stefan Bergkvist
