= Rick Kehoe =

Canadian ice hockey player and coach

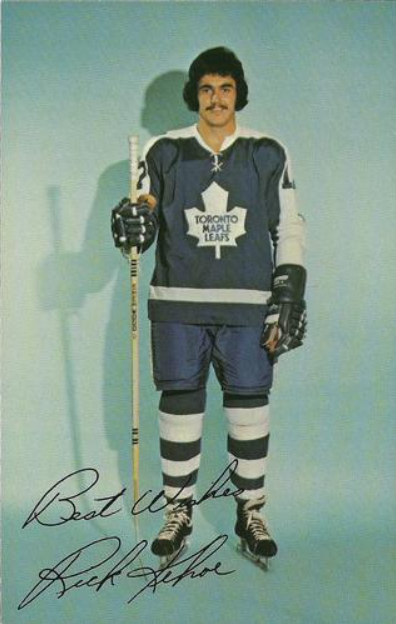
- Kehoe in 1973 photo
- Born: July 15, 1951 (age 75) Windsor, Ontario, Canada
- Height: 5 ft 11 in (180 cm)
- Weight: 180 lb (82 kg; 12 st 12 lb)
- Position: Right wing
- Shot: Right
- Played for: Toronto Maple Leafs; Pittsburgh Penguins
- NHL draft: 22nd overall, 1971; Toronto Maple Leafs
- Playing career: 1969–1985

Richard Thomas Kehoe (born July 15, 1951) is a Canadian former professional ice hockey player and coach. He was drafted by the Toronto Maple Leafs in the 1971 NHL entry draft but spent most of his professional career with the Pittsburgh Penguins. Upon his retirement in 1985, Kehoe ranked first among the Penguins' scoring leaders.

== Playing career ==
Kehoe played junior hockey in the Ontario Hockey Association with the London Knights and the Hamilton Red Wings. He was drafted in the second round (22nd overall) by the Toronto Maple Leafs in the 1971 NHL entry draft.

He played in 32 games with the Tulsa Oilers of the Central Hockey League in 1971 before being promoted to the Maple Leafs midway through the 1972 season. He led the Leafs in goal scoring during the 1973 season with 33 goals.

Kehoe was traded to the Pittsburgh Penguins in 1974 and spent the remainder of his playing days with the Penguins. A notably clean player—he recorded 120 penalty minutes in a 14-season career—he won the Lady Byng Trophy in 1981, during which he scored a career best 55 goals. He retired after the 1985 season as the Penguins' career scoring leader, though most of his records were later shattered by Mario Lemieux. He currently ranks fifth in points behind Lemieux, Jaromír Jágr, Sidney Crosby and Evgeni Malkin.

In his playing career, he played in 906 NHL games, scoring 371 goals and 396 assists for 767 points, and accrued 120 penalty minutes. In 39 playoff games, he scored 4 goals and 17 assists for 21 points with 4 penalty minutes.

== Awards and achievements ==
- Won the Lady Byng Trophy in 1980–1981.
- Played in the NHL All-Star Game in 1981 and 1983.
- Member of the Trib Total Media Penguins All-Time Team and the Pittsburgh Penguins Hall of Fame
- Pictured up in the Ring of Honor that formerly circled in the Pittsburgh Civic Arena

== Career statistics ==
=== Regular season and playoffs ===
			Regular season					Playoffs
Season	Team	League	GP	G	A	Pts	PIM	GP	G	A	Pts	PIM
1969–70	London Knights	OHA	23	3	2	5	6	—	—	—	—	—
1969–70	Hamilton Red Wings	OHA	32	2	4	6	7	—	—	—	—	—
1970–71	Hamilton Red Wings	OHA	58	39	41	80	43	7	4	0	4	2
1971–72	Toronto Maple Leafs	NHL	38	8	8	16	4	2	0	0	0	2
1971–72	Tulsa Oilers	CHL	32	18	21	39	20	—	—	—	—	—
1972–73	Toronto Maple Leafs	NHL	77	33	42	75	20	—	—	—	—	—
1973–74	Toronto Maple Leafs	NHL	69	18	22	40	8	—	—	—	—	—
1974–75	Pittsburgh Penguins	NHL	76	32	31	63	22	9	0	2	2	0
1975–76	Pittsburgh Penguins	NHL	71	29	47	76	6	3	0	0	0	0
1976–77	Pittsburgh Penguins	NHL	80	30	27	57	10	3	0	2	2	0
1977–78	Pittsburgh Penguins	NHL	70	29	21	50	10	—	—	—	—	—
1978–79	Pittsburgh Penguins	NHL	57	27	18	45	2	7	0	2	2	0
1979–80	Pittsburgh Penguins	NHL	79	30	30	60	4	5	2	5	7	0
1980–81	Pittsburgh Penguins	NHL	80	55	33	88	6	5	0	3	3	0
1981–82	Pittsburgh Penguins	NHL	71	33	52	85	8	5	2	3	5	2
1982–83	Pittsburgh Penguins	NHL	75	29	36	65	12	—	—	—	—	—
1983–84	Pittsburgh Penguins	NHL	57	18	27	45	8	—	—	—	—	—
1984–85	Pittsburgh Penguins	NHL	6	0	2	2	0	—	—	—	—	—
NHL totals			906	371	396	767	120	39	4	17	21	4

== Coaching career ==
Kehoe became Director of Pro Scouting for the Penguins in 1985 and was named an assistant coach in 1986. Kehoe's name was engraved on the Stanley Cup with Pittsburgh in 1991 and 1992. He remained in the Penguins organization as a scout or assistant coach until 2002.

Four games into the 2001–02 season, Kehoe took over for former Czech Olympic coach Ivan Hlinka as head coach of the Penguins. Kehoe served as head coach of the Penguins from 2002 to 2003, amassing a 55–81–14 record. Kehoe was replaced by Ed Olczyk after the 2002–03 season. His final stint as a coach in the organization was as interim coach for the minor-league Wilkes-Barre/Scranton Penguins when Michel Therrien was called up to Pittsburgh as head coach; the Baby Pens had a 2–1 record in the three games Kehoe was behind the bench.

On September 18, 2006, he was named to the professional scouting staff for the New York Rangers.

Kehoe was inducted into the Pittsburgh Penguins Hall of Fame in 1992 and the Western Pennsylvania Sports Hall of Fame in 1995. He currently resides in Canonsburg, Pennsylvania.

=== Coaching record ===
Team	Year	Regular season							Postseason			
Team	Year	G	W	L	T	OTL	Pts	Finish	G	W	L	Result
Pittsburgh Penguins	2001–02	78	28	37	8	5	69	5th in Atlantic	—	—	—	Missed playoffs
Pittsburgh Penguins	2002–03	82	27	44	6	5	65	5th in Atlantic	—	—	—	Missed playoffs
NHL totals		158	55	81	14	10						

Preceded by Ivan Hlinka	Head coach of the Pittsburgh Penguins; 2001–03	Succeeded by Ed Olczyk
Preceded by Wayne Gretzky	Winner of the Lady Byng Trophy; 1981	Succeeded by Rick Middleton
