= John Flesch =

Canadian ice hockey player

- Born: July 15, 1953 (age 72) Sudbury, Ontario, Canada
- Height: 6 ft 2 in (188 cm)
- Weight: 205 lb (93 kg; 14 st 9 lb)
- Position: Left wing
- Shot: Left
- Played for: Minnesota North Stars; Pittsburgh Penguins; Colorado Rockies
- NHL draft: 69th overall, 1973; Atlanta Flames
- WHA draft: 72nd overall, 1973; Minnesota Fighting Saints
- Playing career: 1973–1986

John Patrick Flesch (born July 15, 1953 in Sudbury, Ontario) is a Canadian former professional ice hockey left winger. He was drafted by the Atlanta Flames in the fifth round, 69th overall, of the 1973 NHL Amateur Draft. He played 124 National Hockey League games with the Minnesota North Stars, Pittsburgh Penguins, and Colorado Rockies.

He was also drafted by the World Hockey Association's Minnesota Fighting Saints; however, he never played in that league.

== Career statistics ==
			Regular Season					Playoffs
Season	Team	League	GP	G	A	Pts	PIM	GP	G	A	Pts	PIM
1973–74	Omaha Knights	CHL	69	27	27	54	98	5	1	2	3	4
1974–75	Minnesota North Stars	NHL	57	8	15	23	42	—	—	—	—	—
1975–76	New Haven Nighthawks	AHL	31	11	10	21	95	3	1	0	1	2
1975–76	Minnesota North Stars	NHL	33	3	2	5	47	—	—	—	—	—
1976–77	Columbus Owls	IHL	74	34	39	73	210	7	1	5	6	15
1977–78	Pittsburgh Penguins	NHL	29	7	5	12	19	—	—	—	—	—
1977–78	Dayton/Grand Rapids Owls	IHL	43	11	19	30	106	—	—	—	—	—
1978–79	Grand Rapids Owls	IHL	67	26	56	82	149	22	10	15	25	36
1979–80	Colorado Rockies	NHL	5	0	1	1	4	—	—	—	—	—
1979–80	Grand Rapids Owls	IHL	76	39	54	93	66	—	—	—	—	—
1980–81	Milwaukee Admirals	IHL	70	27	44	71	70	7	1	3	4	6
1981–82	Milwaukee Admirals	IHL	82	39	54	93	45	5	2	2	4	4
1982–83	Milwaukee Admirals	IHL	51	24	31	55	56	11	5	7	12	10
1983–84	Milwaukee Admirals	IHL	81	43	44	87	27	4	0	2	2	0
1984–85	Kalamazoo Wings	IHL	82	38	40	78	72	11	9	4	13	2
1985–86	Kalamazoo Wings	IHL	48	15	15	30	33	6	0	3	3	2
NHL totals			124	18	23	41	112	—	—	—	—	—
