= Stuart Irving =

American ice hockey player and coach (born 1949)

- Born: February 2, 1949 (age 77) Beverly, Massachusetts, U.S.
- Height: 5 ft 7 in (170 cm)
- Weight: 169 lb (77 kg; 12 st 1 lb)
- Position: Left wing
- Shot: Left
- Played for: Jacksonville Barons (AHL); Saginaw Gears (IHL); Grand Rapids Owls (IHL); Milwaukee Admirals (IHL); Muskegon Mohawks (IHL)
- National team: United States
- Playing career: 1972–1983
Medal record
Men's ice hockey
Representing United States
Olympic Games
Silver medal – second place	1972 Sapporo	Team

Stuart Keith "Stu" Irving (born February 2, 1949) is an American former professional ice hockey player who played in the International Hockey League (IHL) and American Hockey League (AHL). He also served as an assistant coach at Merrimack College.

After being drafted for the Vietnam War Irving served in the Mekong Delta prior to being assigned to the United States National Team for the 1972 Winter Olympics. He helped the US win an Olympic silver medal.

Later in 2003 he won the Terry Flanagan Award as an assistant at Merrimack.

== Playing career ==
=== Amateur ===
Irving learned to play hockey on local ponds in Beverly, Massachusetts. He did not play indoor hockey until he was 10 years old. Irving played high school hockey for Beverly High School. Immediately after high school he played in Quebec where he played for a farm team of the Montreal Junior Canadiens. He returned to Massachusetts as a 19-year-old and joined the New England Amateur League. While there he played with Jimmy Logue who was a member of the United States Olympic team in 1964 and 1968. Irving was named to an all-star team that played in an international tournament in Lake Placid, New York. Logue was impressed by Irving's performance at the tournament. Logue told Irving if he was ever interested in playing international hockey to let him know.

=== Vietnam ===
After the end of the season Irving was drafted in to the Armed Forces for the Vietnam War. Irving reported to Fort Dix in New Jersey for recruit training as part of the United States Army. He finished basic training and received orders for advanced infantry training remaining at Fort Dix. While Irving was training preparations for the 1971 US National team were taking place. Logue wanted Irving to attend the try-outs for the team and upon learning Irving was in military training Logue contacted his former Olympic coach Murray Williamson, and who was helping with the 1971 team, in an attempt to get Irving released. The US Army took pride in having their soldiers representing their country and would release players to for training and games. As long as they were with the National team players would not have to report back to their original assignment as they were assigned temporary duty to the team. The duo managed to get Irving a 48-hour pass to attend the try-outs. He completed his training and was assigned to Vietnam. Irving was given a 30-day leave before being shipped out. During his leave Irving worked out for four hours a day and called Logue daily to find out if there was news on if he had made the team. He was told that he was a possible candidate for the Olympic team. When he returned to Fort Dix Irving had not heard if he had made the team. Prior to being deployed Irving asked his captain if he could check if he would be released to join the US national team. While they checked on his status with the team Irving was sequestered to a holding barracks. After four days he was informed that there was no guarantee he would make the team and only a guarantee would allow him to be released to play for the National Team.

Upon arriving in Vietnam Irving was stationed in a small town 100 miles from Saigon in the Mekong Delta. He was offered his choice of jobs, either a radio operator or mail clerk. Fearing being a radio operator would put him in greater danger Irving chose to be the mail clerk. Despite being in Vietnam Irving still hoped to make the Olympic team and had his father send him hockey pucks and sticks. Irving shot pucks against bunkers and sandbags and in a fox hole. After serving for nine months the end of his tour of duty approached. He was offered a chance to re-up for another six months. By doing so he would be moved closer to base and away from the heavier fighting he had already experienced. Following his acceptance of the six-month extension Irving continued to stay in shape by playing tennis matches against doctors and military officers on base. In September 1971 Irving was assigned temporary duty to report to Minneapolis, Minnesota to participate in the National team try-outs for the 1972 Olympic team.

=== United States Olympic Team ===
Irving was able to return to the United States 10 days prior to the try-outs and skated in the New England Amateur League. Irving survived the first rounds of cut in the try-out and joined the team for exhibition play. Irving struggled in the early exhibition games and was being pushed around by bigger players. Because he was assigned to the Olympic team if he were cut he would have to return to Vietnam. Following a game Logue asked Williamson, now the head coach of the Olympic team, about Irving's chances of making the team. Williamson told him Irving was struggling and was not sure if he would make the team, to which Logue replied "what are you going to do-send the kid back to Vietnam? How are you going to feel about that?" Williamson decided to keep Irving around as long as he could. Two weeks before the Olympics began the US team lost a game to the Soviet Union 11–4. Irving scored two goals in the game against Vladislav Tretiak, who was considered one of the best goaltenders in the world at the time. After the game Williamson informed Irving that he had made the team. He finished his military service as a member of the Olympic team.

In his first Olympic game Irving scored an insurance goal in the final minutes of Team USA's 5–3 win over Switzerland. The win put the Americans into the round robin medal round. In the medal round the US lost their first game against Sweden. They rebounded to upset Czechoslovakia, before losing the Soviet Union. The Americans won their fourth game or the round robin defeating Finland 4–1. The win put the United States in a position to win a medal. In the American's final game of the Olympics Irving recorded a goal and an assist in a 6–1 win over Poland. Even with the win the team's medal status had not been determined. Depending on the outcome of two other games the US could finish between second to out of the medals. In the first game Finland upset Sweden assuring the Americans of a medal. In the gold medal game The USSR defeated Czechoslovakia. The loss by the Czechs gave the American's the silver medal.

=== Professional ===
After returning to the States Irving joined the Jacksonville Barons of the American Hockey League. He played only four games with the Barons before joining the Saginaw Gears of the International Hockey League. He played parts of seven season with Saginaw recording 169 goals and 378 points in 456 regular season games. He added another 32 goals and 64 point in 72 playoff games. He finished the 1979–80 season with the Grand Rapids Owls, before joining the Milwaukee Admirals to start the 1980–81 season. Irving finished the final three years of his career with the Muskegon Mohawks. He recorded 33 goals and 76 points in 146 games following his time with the Gears.

After he retired from professional ice hockey Irving served as an assistant coach at Merrimack College.

== Career statistics ==
			Regular season					Playoffs
Season	Team	League	GP	G	A	Pts	PIM	GP	G	A	Pts	PIM
1971–72	United States Olympic Team	Intl	52	20	16	36	64	—	—	—	—	—
1972–73	Jacksonville Barons	AHL	4	1	0	1	11	—	—	—	—	—
1972–73	Saginaw Gears	IHL	72	35	36	71	74	—	—	—	—	—
1973–74	Saginaw Gears	IHL	69	25	29	54	63	13	4	7	11	4
1974–75	Saginaw Gears	IHL	75	32	44	76	97	19	17	14	31	27
1975–76	Saginaw Gears	IHL	78	33	30	63	117	12	4	2	6	15
1976–77	Saginaw Gears	IHL	78	23	37	60	57	19	5	7	12	9
1977–78	Saginaw Gears	IHL	80	35	44	79	56	5	2	1	3	20
1978–79	Saginaw Gears	IHL	71	20	25	45	48	4	0	1	1	16
1979–80	Saginaw Gears	IHL	5	1	0	1	9	—	—	—	—	—
1979–80	Grand Rapids Owls	IHL	59	13	19	32	33	—	—	—	—	—
1980–81	Milwaukee Admirals	IHL	4	0	1	1	4	—	—	—	—	—
1980–81	Muskegon Mohawks	IHL	17	5	5	10	19	3	0	2	2	0
1981–82	Muskegon Mohawks	IHL	64	15	17	32	67	—	—	—	—	—
1982–83	Muskegon Mohawks	IHL	2	0	1	1	5	—	—	—	—	—
IHL totals			674	237	288	525	649	75	32	34	66	91
