= Kevin Schamehorn =

Canadian ice hockey player (1956–2022)

- Born: July 28, 1956; Victoria, British Columbia, Canada
- Died: December 8, 2022 (aged 66)
- Height: 5 ft 10 in (178 cm)
- Weight: 185 lb (84 kg; 13 st 3 lb)
- Position: Right wing
- Shot: Right
- Played for: Detroit Red Wings; Los Angeles Kings
- NHL draft: 58th overall, 1976; Detroit Red Wings
- WHA draft: 70th overall, 1976; Houston Aeros
- Playing career: 1976–1990

Kevin Dean Schamehorn (July 28, 1956 – December 8, 2022) was a Canadian professional ice hockey right winger. He played in 10 National Hockey League games with the Detroit Red Wings and the Los Angeles Kings between 1976 and 1980. The rest of his career, which lasted from 1976 to 1990, was spent in various minor leagues. As a youth, he played in the 1968 and 1969 Quebec International Pee-Wee Hockey Tournaments with a minor ice hockey team from Borden.

Schamehorn died on December 8, 2022, at the age of 66.

== Career statistics ==
=== Regular season and playoffs ===
			Regular season					Playoffs
Season	Team	League	GP	G	A	Pts	PIM	GP	G	A	Pts	PIM
1973–74	New Westminster Bruins	WCHL	2	1	1	2	7	4	0	0	0	0
1973–74	Bellingham Blazers	BCJHL	56	18	8	24	293	—	—	—	—	—
1974–75	Bellingham Blazers	BCJHL	—	—	—	—	—	—	—	—	—	—
1974–75	New Westminster Bruins	WCHL	37	14	6	20	175	18	7	11	18	73
1974–75	New Westminster Bruins	M-Cup	—	—	—	—	—	3	0	3	3	14
1975–76	New Westminster Bruins	WCHL	62	32	42	74	276	17	8	9	17	68
1975–76	New Westminster Bruins	M-Cup	—	—	—	—	—	4	0	0	0	24
1976–77	Detroit Red Wings	NHL	3	0	0	0	9	—	—	—	—	—
1976–77	Kalamazoo Wings	IHL	77	27	32	59	314	10	3	9	12	76
1977–78	Kansas City Red Wings	CHL	36	5	3	8	113	—	—	—	—	—
1977–78	Kalamazoo Wings	IHL	39	18	14	32	144	7	1	3	4	65
1978–79	Kalamazoo Wings	IHL	80	45	57	102	245	15	15	9	24	60
1979–80	Detroit Red Wings	NHL	2	0	0	0	4	—	—	—	—	—
1979–80	Adirondack Red Wings	AHL	60	10	13	23	145	5	0	0	0	13
1980–81	Los Angeles Kings	NHL	5	0	0	0	4	—	—	—	—	—
1980–81	Rochester Americans	AHL	27	6	10	16	44	—	—	—	—	—
1980–81	Houston Apollos	CHL	26	7	9	16	43	—	—	—	—	—
1981–82	Kalamazoo Wings	IHL	75	38	27	65	113	5	1	2	3	25
1982–83	Kalamazoo Wings	IHL	59	38	29	67	78	9	6	3	9	24
1983–84	Kalamazoo Wings	IHL	76	37	31	68	154	3	0	2	2	9
1984–85	Kalamazoo Wings	IHL	80	35	43	78	154	11	4	3	7	31
1985–86	Milwaukee Admirals	IHL	82	47	34	81	101	5	1	3	4	4
1986–87	Milwaukee Admirals	IHL	82	35	35	70	102	6	3	3	6	6
1987–88	Milwaukee Admirals	IHL	57	17	19	36	122	—	—	—	—	—
1987–88	Flint Spirits	IHL	19	3	11	14	32	—	—	—	—	—
1989–90	Kalamazoo Wings	IHL	9	1	2	3	0	—	—	—	—	—
IHL totals			735	341	334	675	1559	71	34	37	71	300
NHL totals			10	0	0	0	17	—	—	—	—	—
