= List of Pittsburgh Penguins players =

Players who have played at least one game for the Pittsburgh Penguins of the National Hockey League (NHL) from 1967–68 to present.

== Key ==
- Current Team player.
- Current NHL player.

Abbreviations
C	Center
D	Defenseman
L	Left Wing
R	Right Wing

Goaltenders
W	Wins
L	Losses
T	Ties
OTL ^{a}	Overtime losses
SO	Shutouts
GAA	Goals against average
SV%	Save percentage

Skaters
GP	Games played
G	Goals
A	Assists
Pts	Points
PIM	Penalty minutes

The "Seasons" column lists the first year of the season of the player's first game and the last year of the season of the player's last game. For example, a player who played one game in the 2000–2001 season would be listed as playing with the team from 2000 to 2001, regardless of what calendar year the game occurred within.

== Goaltenders ==
			Regular season								Playoffs						
Player	Flag	Years	GP	W	L	T	OTL	SO	GAA	SV%	GP	W	L	OTL	SO	GAA	SV%
Jean-Sebastien Aubin	(Canada)	1998–2004	168	63	72	11	10	6	2.92	0.901	1	0	0	0	0	0.00	0.000
Tom Barrasso	(United States)	1988–2000	460	226	153	53	8	22	3.27	0.895	101	56	42	6	6	2.91	0.907
Hank Bassen	(Canada)	1967–1968	25	7	10	3	—	1	2.86	—	—	—	—	—	—	—	—
Les Binkley	(Canada)	1967–1972	196	58	94	34	—	11	3.12	—	7	5	2	0	0	2.10	0.000
Joel Blomqvist	(Finland)	2024–2025	15	4	9	0	1	0	3.81	0.885	—	—	—	—	—	—	—
Martin Brochu	(Canada)	2003–2004	1	0	0	0	0	0	1.84	0.947	—	—	—	—	—	—	—
Andy Brown	(Canada)	1972–1974	45	16	20	6	—	1	3.78	—	—	—	—	—	—	—	—
Sebastien Caron	(Canada)	2000–2006	90	24	47	7	7	4	3.49	0.892	—	—	—	—	—	—	—
Alain Chevrier	(Canada)	1989–1990	3	1	2	0	0	0	5.06	0.843	—	—	—	—	—	—	—
Andy Chiodo	(Canada)	2003–2004	8	3	4	1	0	0	3.46	0.892	—	—	—	—	—	—	—
Mike Condon	(United States)	2016–2017	1	0	0	0	0	0	0.00	1.000	—	—	—	—	—	—	—
Ty Conklin	(United States)	2007–2008	33	18	8	0	5	2	2.51	0.923	—	—	—	—	—	—	—
John Curry	(United States)	2008–2010	4	2	2	0	0	0	3.79	0.867	—	—	—	—	—	—	—
Joe Daley	(Canada)	1968–1970	38	11	18	6	—	2	3.16	—	—	—	—	—	—	—	—
Philippe De Rouville	(Canada)	1994–1997	3	1	2	0	0	0	3.16	0.903	—	—	—	—	—	—	—
Casey DeSmith	(United States)	2017–2023	134	58	44	0	15	9	2.81	0.912	1	0	0	0	0	2.02	.941
Michel Dion	(Canada)	1981–1985	151	42	79	20	—	0	4.28	—	5	2	3	0	0	4.34	0.000
Louis Domingue	(Canada)	2021–2022	2	1	1	0	0	0	2.02	0.952	6	3	3	0	0	3.65	.898
Robert Dopson	(Canada)	1993–1994	2	0	0	0	0	0	3.96	0.870	—	—	—	—	—	—	—
Gary Edwards	(Canada)	1981–1982	6	3	2	1	—	1	3.67	—	—	—	—	—	—	—	—
Marv Edwards	(Canada)	1968–1969	1	0	1	0	—	0	3.00	—	—	—	—	—	—	—	—
Roy Edwards	(Canada)	1971–1972	15	2	8	4	—	0	2.55	—	—	—	—	—	—	—	—
Marc-Andre Fleury	(Canada)	2003–2017	691	375	216	2	68	44	2.58	0.912	115	62	51	4	10	2.56	0.908
Brian Ford	(Canada)	1984–1985	8	2	6	0	—	0	6.30	—	—	—	—	—	—	—	—
Mathieu Garon	(Canada)	2008–2009	4	2	1	0	0	0	2.91	0.894	1	0	0	0	0	0.00	1.000
Thomas Greiss	(Germany)	2014–2015	20	9	6	0	3	0	2.59	0.908	—	—	—	—	—	—	—
Steve Guenette	(Canada)	1986–1989	32	17	15	0	0	1	3.71	—	—	—	—	—	—	—	—
Paul Harrison	(Canada)	1981–1982	13	3	7	0	—	0	5.49	—	—	—	—	—	—	—	—
Johan Hedberg	(Sweden)	2000–2003	116	46	57	12	6	7	2.88	0.901	18	9	9	2	2	2.30	0.911
Magnus Hellberg	(Sweden)	2023–2024	3	1	0	—	0	0	2.50	0.922	—	—	—	—	—	—	—
Denis Herron	(Canada)	1972–1986	290	88	133	44	—	6	3.88	—	10	3	7	0	0	3.49	0.000
Paul Hoganson	(Canada)	1970–1971	2	0	1	0	—	0	7.37	—	—	—	—	—	—	—	—
Robert Holland	(Canada)	1979–1981	44	11	22	9	—	1	4.08	—	—	—	—	—	—	—	—
Gary Inness	(Canada)	1973–1976	100	39	37	13	—	2	3.34	—	9	5	4	0	0	2.67	0.000
Tristan Jarry	(Canada)	2016–2026	307	161	100	0	32	22	2.74	0.909	8	2	6	0	0	3.00	.899
Bob Johnson	(United States)	1974–1975	12	3	4	1	—	0	5.04	—	—	—	—	—	—	—	—
Brent Johnson	(United States)	2009–2012	62	29	18	0	6	1	2.61	0.907	3	0	0	0	0	4.89	0.708
Maxime Lagace	(Canada)	2020–2021	1	1	0	0	0	0	0.00	1.000	—	—	—	—	—	—	—
Patrick Lalime	(Canada)	1996–1997	39	21	12	2	2	3	2.95	0.913	—	—	—	—	—	—	—
Gordon Laxton	(Canada)	1975–1979	17	4	9	0	—	0	5.55	—	—	—	—	—	—	—	—
Gilles Meloche	(Canada)	1985–1988	104	34	43	17	1	0	3.65	—	—	—	—	—	—	—	—
Gregory Millen	(Canada)	1978–1981	135	57	56	18	—	4	3.83	—	10	4	6	0	0	3.84	0.000
Sergei Murashov	(Russia)	2025–2026	5	1	1	0	2	1	2.56	0.897	—	—	—	—	—	—	—
Matt Murray	(Canada)	2015–2020	199	117	53	0	19	11	2.67	0.914	51	29	21	0	6	2.18	0.921
Alex Nedeljkovic	(United States)	2023–2025	76	32	22	—	12	2	3.05	0.898	—	—	—	—	—	—	—
Cam Newton	(Canada)	1970–1973	16	4	7	1	—	0	3.76	—	—	—	—	—	—	—	—
Antti Niemi	(Finland)	2017–2018	3	0	3	0	0	0	7.50	0.797	—	—	—	—	—	—	—
Rich Parent	(Canada)	2000–2001	7	1	1	3	0	0	3.08	0.887	—	—	—	—	—	—	—
Alexander Pechurskiy	(Russia)	2009–2010	1	0	0	0	0	0	1.69	0.923	—	—	—	—	—	—	—
Frank Pietrangelo	(Canada)	1987–1992	87	34	32	3	4	1	4.13	0.873	5	4	1	0	1	3.13	0.899
Michel Plasse	(Canada)	1974–1976	75	33	24	14	—	2	3.59	—	3	1	2	0	1	2.67	0.000
Greg Redquest	(Canada)	1977–1978	1	0	0	0	—	0	13.85	—	—	—	—	—	—	—	—
Nick Ricci	(Canada)	1979–1983	19	7	12	0	—	0	4.36	—	—	—	—	—	—	—	—
Pat Riggin	(Canada)	1986–1988	39	15	14	7	0	0	3.64	—	—	—	—	—	—	—	—
Roberto Romano	(Canada)	1982–1994	125	46	62	8	0	4	3.96	—	—	—	—	—	—	—	—
James Rutherford	(Canada)	1971–1974	115	44	49	14	—	4	3.14	—	4	0	4	0	0	3.50	0.000
Dany Sabourin	(Canada)	2005–2009	44	16	18	0	3	2	2.88	0.899	—	—	—	—	—	—	—
Arturs Silovs	(Latvia)	2025–2026	39	19	12	0	8	2	3.07	0.887	3	2	0	1	0	1.52	0.939
Stuart Skinner	(Canada)	2025–2026	27	12	9	0	5	0	2.99	0.885	3	0	3	0	0	3.08	0.873
Peter Skudra	(Latvia)	1997–2000	74	26	22	11	1	4	2.65	0.894	1	0	0	0	0	3.00	0.909
Allan Smith	(Canada)	1969–1971	92	24	42	17	—	4	3.07	—	3	1	2	0	0	3.33	0.000
Garth Snow	(United States)	2000–2001	35	14	15	4	3	3	2.98	0.900	0	0	0	0	0	0.00	0.000
Rick Tabaracci	(Canada)	1988–1989	1	0	0	0	0	0	7.25	0.810	—	—	—	—	—	—	—
Bobby Taylor	(Canada)	1975–1976	2	0	1	0	—	0	5.38	—	—	—	—	—	—	—	—
Jocelyn Thibault	(Canada)	2005–2007	38	8	17	0	5	1	3.52	0.894	1	0	0	0	0	0.00	1.000
Brad Thiessen	(Canada)	2011–2012	5	3	1	0	0	0	3.72	0.858	—	—	—	—	—	—	—
Dustin Tokarski	(Canada)	2022–2023	4	1	2	0	0	0	3.44	0.897	—	—	—	—	—	—	—
Vincent Tremblay	(Canada)	1983–1984	4	0	4	0	—	0	6.00	—	—	—	—	—	—	—	—
Ron Tugnutt	(Canada)	1999–2000	7	4	2	0	0	0	2.40	0.924	11	6	5	2	2	1.77	0.945
Tomas Vokoun	(Czech Republic)	2012–2013	20	13	4	0	0	3	2.45	0.919	11	6	5	2	1	2.01	0.933
Dunc Wilson	(Canada)	1976–1978	66	23	30	11	—	5	3.53	—	—	—	—	—	—	—	—
Ken Wregget	(Canada)	1991–1998	212	104	67	21	4	6	3.29	0.898	26	13	12	1	1	2.93	0.914
Wendell Young	(Canada)	1988–1995	111	42	47	5	1	1	4.14	0.876	1	0	0	0	0	1.55	0.909
Jeff Zatkoff	(United States)	2013–2016	35	16	14	0	3	1	2.66	0.915	2	1	1	0	0	3.07	0.908

== Notes ==
a: As of the 2005–2006 NHL season, all games have a winner; teams losing in overtime and shootouts are awarded one point thus the OTL stat replaces the tie statistic. The OTL column also includes SOL (Shootout losses).

== Skaters ==
				Regular season					Playoffs				
Player	Flag	Pos	Years	GP	G	A	Pts	PIM	GP	G	A	Pts	PIM
Ramzi Abid	(Canada)	L	2002–2004	19	3	2	5	29	—	—	—	—	—
Noel Acciari	(United States)	C	2023–2026	201	22	22	44	51	6	0	1	1	12
Craig Adams	(Canada)	R	2008–2015	453	18	53	70	300	77	7	5	12	64
Andrew Agozzino	(Canada)	LW	2019–2020	17	0	2	2	4	—	—	—	—	—
Peter Ahola	(Finland)	D	1992–1993	22	0	1	1	14	—	—	—	—	—
Brad Aitken	(Canada)	L	1987–1991	11	1	2	3	25	—	—	—	—	—
Peter Allen	(Canada)	D	1995–1996	8	0	0	0	8	—	—	—	—	—
Russ Anderson	(United States)	D	1976–1982	353	15	77	92	684	10	0	3	3	28
Paul Andrea	(Canada)	R	1967–1969	90	18	27	45	4	—	—	—	—	—
Greg Andrusak	(Canada)	D	1993–1999	19	0	5	5	12	12	1	0	1	6
Anthony Angello	(United States)	C	2019–2022	31	3	2	5	14	—	—	—	—	—
Lou Angotti	(Canada)	C	1968–1969	71	17	20	37	36	—	—	—	—	—
Shawn Antoski	(Canada)	L	1996–1997	13	0	0	0	49	—	—	—	—	—
Syl Apps Jr.	(Canada)	C	1970–1978	495	151	349	500	241	19	4	4	8	23
John Arbour	(Canada)	D	1968–1969	17	0	2	2	35	—	—	—	—	—
Josh Archibald	(United States)	R	2015–2017; 2022–2023	76	9	6	15	47	4	0	0	0	2
Mark Arcobello	(United States)	C	2014–2015	10	0	2	2	2	—	—	—	—	—
Colby Armstrong	(Canada)	R	2005–2008	181	37	61	98	175	5	0	1	1	11
Chuck Arnason	(Canada)	R	1973–1976	149	46	40	86	50	9	2	4	6	4
Arron Asham	(Canada)	R	2010–2012	108	10	17	27	122	10	3	1	4	12
Zach Aston-Reese	(United States)	L	2017–2022	213	29	33	62	93	23	1	3	4	8
Don Awrey	(Canada)	D	1976–1977	79	1	12	13	40	3	0	1	1	0
Wayne Babych	(Canada)	R	1984–1986	67	20	34	54	35	—	—	—	—	—
Matthew Barnaby	(Canada)	R	1998–2001	129	15	18	33	399	24	0	2	2	64
Stu Barnes	(Canada)	C	1996–1999	204	67	69	136	66	11	3	4	7	2
Doug Barrie	(Canada)	D	1968–1969	8	1	1	2	8	—	—	—	—	—
Len Barrie	(Canada)	C	1994–1996	53	3	11	14	84	4	1	0	1	8
Andy Bathgate	(Canada)	R	1967–1971	150	35	68	103	89	—	—	—	—	—
Nolan Baumgartner	(Canada)	D	2003–2004	5	0	0	0	2	—	—	—	—	—
Paul Baxter	(Canada)	D	1980–1983	202	25	69	94	851	10	0	1	1	42
Anthony Beauvillier	(Canada)	L	2024–2025	63	13	7	20	14	—	—	—	—	—
Kris Beech	(Canada)	C	2001–2008	100	10	17	27	59	—	—	—	—	—
Roger Belanger Jr.	(Canada)	C	1984–1985	44	3	5	8	32	—	—	—	—	—
Neil Belland	(Canada)	D	1986–1987	3	0	1	1	0	—	—	—	—	—
Emil Bemström	(Sweden)	C	2023–2025	38	3	3	6	2	—	—	—	—	—
Beau Bennett	(United States)	R	2012–2016	129	16	29	45	32	21	2	4	6	8
Harvey Bennett	(United States)	C	1974–1976	32	3	3	6	53	—	—	—	—	—
Josef Beranek	(Czech Republic)	L	1996–2001	91	16	19	35	65	29	0	5	5	8
Drake Berehowsky	(Canada)	D	1994–2004	52	5	16	21	63	1	0	0	0	0
Yves Bergeron	(Canada)	R	1974–1977	3	0	0	0	0	—	—	—	—	—
Marc Bergevin	(Canada)	D	2000–2004	157	4	17	21	89	12	0	1	1	2
Stefan Bergqvist	(Sweden)	D	1995–1997	7	0	0	0	9	4	0	0	0	2
Rick Berry	(Canada)	D	2001–2002	13	0	2	2	21	—	—	—	—	—
Nick Beverley	(Canada)	D	1973–1974	67	2	14	16	21	—	—	—	—	—
Wayne Bianchin	(Canada)	R	1973–1979	265	68	41	109	130	3	0	1	1	6
Larry Bignell	(Canada)	D	1973–1974	20	0	3	3	2	3	0	0	0	2
Paul Bissonnette	(Canada)	L	2008–2009	15	0	1	1	22	—	—	—	—	—
Kasper Bjorkqvist	(Finland)	R	2021–2022	6	1	0	1	2	—	—	—	—	—
Barry Bjugstad	(United States)	L	1988–1989	24	3	0	3	4	—	—	—	—	—
Nick Bjugstad	(United States)	C	2018–2020	45	10	6	16	22	4	0	0	0	2
Bob Blackburn	(Canada)	D	1969–1971	124	8	12	20	105	6	0	0	0	4
Tom Bladon	(Canada)	D	1978–1980	135	6	29	35	99	8	0	5	5	2
Mike Blaisdell	(Canada)	R	1985–1987	76	16	15	31	38	—	—	—	—	—
Joseph Blandisi	(Canada)	C	2018–2020	27	2	3	5	10	—	—	—	—	—
Teddy Blueger	(Latvia)	C	2018–2023	250	33	59	92	82	18	1	1	2	4
Doug Bodger	(Canada)	D	1984–1989	299	35	132	167	292	—	—	—	—	—
Eric Boguniecki	(United States)	C	2005–2006	38	5	6	11	29	—	—	—	—	—
Patrick Boileau	(Canada)	D	2003–2004	16	3	4	7	8	—	—	—	—	—
Leo Boivin	(Canada)	D	1967–1969	114	14	26	40	100	—	—	—	—	—
Brian Bonin	(United States)	C	1998–1999	5	0	0	0	0	3	0	0	0	0
Nick Bonino	(United States)	C	2015–2017; 2022–2023	146	36	39	75	47	45	8	17	25	14
Dennis Bonvie	(Canada)	R	1999–2001	31	0	0	0	80	—	—	—	—	—
Robert Bortuzzo	(Canada)	D	2011–2015	113	4	16	20	171	8	0	1	1	4
Joel Bouchard	(Canada)	D	2002–2003	7	0	1	1	0	—	—	—	—	—
Philippe Boucher	(Canada)	D	2008–2009	25	3	3	6	24	9	1	3	4	4
Bob Boughner	(Canada)	D	1999–2001	69	2	3	5	216	29	0	3	3	37
Chris Bourque	(United States)	L	2009–2010	20	0	3	3	10	—	—	—	—	—
Phil Bourque	(United States)	L	1983–1992	344	75	89	164	435	56	13	12	25	107
Pat Boutette	(Canada)	L	1981–1985	247	65	109	174	548	5	3	1	4	8
Zach Boychuk	(Canada)	L	2012–2013	7	0	0	0	2	—	—	—	—	—
Randy Boyd	(Canada)	D	1981–1984	84	4	17	21	126	3	0	0	0	11
Wally Boyer	(Canada)	C	1968–1972	203	32	62	94	81	10	1	2	3	0
Brian Boyle	(United States)	C	2021–2022	66	11	10	21	27	6	0	2	2	0
Matt Bradley	(Canada)	R	2003–2004	82	7	9	16	65	—	—	—	—	—
Derick Brassard	(Canada)	C	2017–2019	54	12	11	23	33	12	1	3	4	4
Justin Brazeau	(Canada)	F	2025–2026	64	17	17	34	14	1	0	0	0	0
Tim Brent	(Canada)	C	2007–2008	1	0	0	0	0	—	—	—	—	—
Andy Brickley	(United States)	L	1983–1985	95	25	35	60	19	—	—	—	—	—
Michel Briere	(Canada)	C	1969–1970	76	12	32	44	20	10	5	3	8	17
Doug Brown	(United States)	R	1993–1994	77	18	37	55	18	6	0	0	0	2
Greg Brown	(United States)	D	1993–1994	36	3	8	11	28	6	0	1	1	4
Rob Brown	(Canada)	R	1987–2000	414	150	192	342	392	41	9	10	19	34
Tristan Broz	(United States)	C	2025–2026	1	0	0	0	0	—	—	—	—	—
Harrison Brunicke	(Canada)	D	2025–2026	9	1	0	1	6	—	—	—	—	—
Kelly Buchberger	(Canada)	R	2003–2004	71	1	3	4	109	—	—	—	—	—
Mike Bullard	(Canada)	C	1980–1987	382	185	175	360	388	9	4	4	8	4
Edward Bulley	(Canada)	L	1983–1984	26	3	2	5	12	—	—	—	—	—
Michael Bunting	(Canada)	L	2023–2025	79	20	28	48	50	—	—	—	—	—
Charlie Burns	(United States)	C	1968–1969	76	13	38	51	22	—	—	—	—	—
Robin Burns	(Canada)	L	1970–1973	41	0	5	5	32	—	—	—	—	—
Dave Burrows	(Canada)	D	1971–1981	573	24	108	132	301	20	1	3	4	16
Rod Buskas	(Canada)	D	1982–1990	431	16	48	64	959	10	0	0	0	23
Sven Butenschon	(Germany)	D	1997–2001	33	0	1	1	14	—	—	—	—	—
Drake Caggiula	(Canada)	L	2022–2023	4	0	0	0	0	—	—	—	—	—
Eric Cairns	(Canada)	D	2005–2007	28	1	0	1	92	—	—	—	—	—
Jock Callander	(Canada)	R	1987–1990	101	21	28	49	114	22	3	8	11	12
Colin Campbell	(Canada)	D	1974–1979	243	14	52	66	517	19	2	7	9	51
Dave Capuano	(United States)	L	1989–1990	6	0	0	0	2	—	—	—	—	—
Luca Caputi	(Canada)	L	2008–2010	9	2	1	3	6	—	—	—	—	—
Steve Cardwell	(Canada)	L	1970–1973	53	9	11	20	35	4	0	0	0	2
Randy Carlyle	(Canada)	D	1978–1984	397	66	257	323	582	22	6	8	14	41
Gene Carr	(Canada)	C	1977–1978	70	17	37	54	76	—	—	—	—	—
Jeff Carter	(Canada)	C	2020–2024	241	52	48	100	80	13	8	2	10	10
Tom Cassidy	(Canada)	C	1977–1978	26	3	4	7	15	—	—	—	—	—
Jay Caufield	(United States)	R	1988–1993	194	3	7	10	714	14	0	0	0	30
Cody Ceci	(Canada)	D	2020–2021	53	4	13	17	10	6	0	2	2	0
John Chabot	(Canada)	C	1984–1987	216	36	98	134	26	—	—	—	—	—
Blair Chapman	(Canada)	R	1976–1980	227	48	51	99	71	10	2	1	3	9
Todd Charlesworth	(Canada)	D	1983–1988	86	3	9	12	41	—	—	—	—	—
Marc Chorney	(Canada)	D	1980–1984	139	5	18	23	151	7	0	1	1	2
Taylor Chorney	(United States)	D	2014–2015	7	0	0	0	0	5	0	0	0	2
Tom Chorske	(United States)	R	1999–2000	33	1	5	6	2	—	—	—	—	—
Egor Chinakhov	(Russia)	R	2025–2026	43	18	18	36	4	6	0	0	0	0
Erik Christensen	(Canada)	C	2005–2008	143	33	33	66	88	4	0	0	0	6
Jeffrey Christian	(Canada)	L	1994–1997	15	2	2	4	15	—	—	—	—	—
Jeff Chychrun	(Canada)	D	1991–1993	18	0	1	1	37	—	—	—	—	—
Kim Clackson	(Canada)	D	1979–1980	45	0	3	3	166	3	0	0	0	37
Adam Clendening	(United States)	D	2015–2016	9	0	1	1	10	—	—	—	—	—
Connor Clifton	(United States)	D	2025–2026	50	2	4	6	53	3	0	0	0	0
Nathan Clurman	(United States)	D	2024–2025	1	0	0	0	2	—	—	—	—	—
Paul Coffey	(Canada)	D	1987–1992	331	108	332	440	573	23	4	22	26	37
Ian Cole	(United States)	D	2014–2018	171	6	40	46	138	54	1	13	14	44
Blake Comeau	(Canada)	R	2014–2015	61	16	15	31	65	5	1	0	1	8
Mike Comrie	(Canada)	C	2010–2011	21	1	5	6	18	—	—	—	—	—
Chris Conner	(United States)	R	2009–2014	87	13	11	24	12	8	1	0	1	0
Matt Cooke	(Canada)	L	2008–2013	352	67	83	150	416	58	5	16	21	95
Rene Corbet	(Canada)	L	1999–2001	47	9	9	18	57	24	2	1	3	21
Frank Corrado	(Canada)	D	2016–2018	7	0	0	0	4	—	—	—	—	—
Mike Corrigan	(Canada)	L	1976–1978	98	22	39	61	46	2	0	0	0	0
Jacques Cossette	(Canada)	R	1975–1979	64	8	6	14	29	3	0	1	1	4
Ryan Craig	(Canada)	C	2010–2011	6	0	0	0	22	—	—	—	—	—
Sidney Crosby	(Canada)	C	2005–2026	1420	654	1107	1761	898	186	72	134	206	89
Cory Cross	(Canada)	D	2005–2006	6	0	1	1	6	—	—	—	—	—
Bruce Crowder	(Canada)	R	1984–1985	26	4	7	11	23	—	—	—	—	—
Greg Crozier	(Canada)	L	2000–2001	1	0	0	0	0	—	—	—	—	—
John Cullen	(Canada)	C	1988–1995	262	88	184	272	399	20	3	8	11	36
Matt Cullen	(United States)	C	2015–2017; 2018–2019	225	36	47	83	64	53	6	9	15	32
Randy Cunneyworth	(Canada)	L	1985–1989	295	101	115	216	513	11	3	5	8	26
Josh Currie	(Canada)	R	2020–2021	1	0	0	0	0	—	—	—	—	—
Kevin Czuczman	(Canada)	D	2020–2021	2	0	0	0	0	—	—	—	—	—
Matt D'Agostini	(Canada)	R	2013–2014	8	0	1	1	4	—	—	—	—	—
Chris Dahlquist	(United States)	D	1985–1991	195	10	26	36	219	2	0	0	0	0
Alexandre Daigle	(Canada)	R	2002–2003	33	4	3	7	8	—	—	—	—	—
J. J. Daigneault	(Canada)	D	1995–1997	66	6	17	23	59	17	1	9	10	36
Trevor Daley	(Canada)	D	2015–2017	109	11	30	41	63	36	2	9	11	34
Jeff Daniels	(Canada)	L	1990–1994	134	8	11	19	36	12	3	2	5	0
Kim Davis	(Canada)	C	1977–1981	34	5	7	12	47	4	0	0	0	0
Billy Dea	(Canada)	L	1967–1969	139	26	20	46	10	—	—	—	—	—
Jean-Sebastien Dea	(Canada)	C	2016–2019	9	2	0	2	6	—	—	—	—	—
Nelson Debenedet	(Canada)	L	1974–1975	31	6	3	9	11	—	—	—	—	—
Dean Defazio	(Canada)	L	1983–1984	22	0	2	2	28	—	—	—	—	—
Gilbert Delorme	(Canada)	D	1989–1990	54	3	7	10	44	—	—	—	—	—
Ab DeMarco Jr.	(United States)	D	1973–1975	42	9	13	22	8	—	—	—	—	—
Larry Depalma	(United States)	C	1993–1994	7	1	0	1	5	1	0	0	0	0
Vincent Desharnais	(Canada)	D	2024-2025	10	0	0	0	4	—	—	—	—	—
Simon Despres	(Canada)	D	2011–2015	144	5	28	33	120	6	0	0	0	2
Connor Dewar	(Canada)	C	2024–2026	95	18	19	37	28	6	2	0	2	2
Thomas Di Pauli	(United States)	C	2019–2020	2	0	0	0	10	—	—	—	—	—
Bob Dillabough	(Canada)	C	1967–1969	61	7	12	19	20	—	—	—	—	—
Gordon Dineen	(Canada)	D	1988–1992	117	2	10	12	175	11	0	2	2	8
Bob Dollas	(Canada)	D	1998–2001	75	2	8	10	64	13	1	0	1	6
Robert Dome	(Slovakia)	L	1997–2000	52	7	7	14	12	—	—	—	—	—
Shean Donovan	(Canada)	R	2001–2003	65	6	6	12	34	—	—	—	—	—
Steve Downie	(Canada)	R	2014–2015	72	14	14	28	238	5	0	2	2	4
Nick Drazenovic	(Canada)	C	2013–2014	1	0	0	0	2	—	—	—	—	—
Justin Duberman	(United States)	R	1993–1994	4	0	0	0	0	—	—	—	—	—
Ron Duguay	(Canada)	C	1985–1987	53	11	20	31	36	—	—	—	—	—
Matt Dumba	(Canada)	D	2025–2026	11	1	2	3	11	—	—	—	—	—
Brian Dumoulin	(United States)	D	2013–2023	546	19	120	139	146	81	4	21	25	16
Micki Dupont	(Canada)	D	2006–2007	3	0	1	1	4	—	—	—	—	—
Pascal Dupuis	(Canada)	R	2007–2016	452	109	138	247	197	77	14	19	33	44
Steve Durbano	(Canada)	D	1973–1976	66	4	23	27	309	—	—	—	—	—
Steve Dykstra	(Canada)	L	1988–1989	65	1	6	7	126	1	0	0	0	2
Joe Dziedzic	(United States)	L	1995–1997	128	14	14	28	131	21	1	3	4	23
Mike Eastwood	(Canada)	C	2003–2004	82	4	15	19	40	—	—	—	—	—
Mark Eaton	(United States)	D	2006–2013	241	7	24	31	86	50	4	9	13	14
Andrew Ebbett	(Canada)	C	2013–2015	33	1	6	7	2	—	—	—	—	—
Darryl Edestrand	(Canada)	D	1971–1974	158	25	47	72	140	4	0	2	2	0
Thomas Edur	(Canada)	D	1977–1978	58	5	38	43	18	—	—	—	—	—
Christian Ehrhoff	(Germany)	D	2014–2015	49	3	11	14	26	—	—	—	—	—
Nisse Ekman	(Sweden)	R	2006–2007	34	6	9	15	24	1	0	0	0	0
Lars Eller	(Denmark)	C	2023–2025	99	19	19	38	42	—	—	—	—	—
Shane Endicott	(Canada)	C	2001–2006	45	1	2	3	47	—	—	—	—	—
Deryk Engelland	(Canada)	D	2009–2014	243	13	34	47	308	13	0	1	1	22
Bryan Erickson	(United States)	C	1987–1988	11	1	4	5	0	—	—	—	—	—
Bob Errey	(Canada)	L	1983–1993	572	132	140	272	651	49	9	4	13	51
Pat Falloon	(Canada)	R	1999–2000	30	4	9	13	10	10	1	0	1	2
Bobby Farnham	(United States)	L	2015–2016	14	0	0	0	29	—	—	—	—	—
Rico Fata	(Canada)	L	2002–2006	120	21	26	47	74	—	—	—	—	—
Mario Faubert	(Canada)	D	1974–1982	231	21	90	111	292	10	2	2	4	6
Ruslan Fedotenko	(Ukraine)	L	2008–2010	145	27	42	69	94	30	7	7	14	8
Taylor Fedun	(Canada)	D	2022–2023	4	0	0	0	0	—	—	—	—	—
Eric Fehr	(Canada)	C	2015–2017	107	14	11	25	33	23	3	1	4	6
Tony Feltrin	(Canada)	D	1980–1983	38	3	3	6	44	—	—	—	—	—
Andrew Ference	(Canada)	D	1999–2003	163	11	25	36	157	18	3	7	10	16
George Ferguson	(Canada)	C	1978–1983	310	89	106	195	162	22	4	11	15	13
Chris Ferraro	(United States)	C	1997–1998	46	3	4	7	43	—	—	—	—	—
Peter Ferraro	(United States)	R	1997–1998	29	3	4	7	12	—	—	—	—	—
Jonathan Filewich	(Canada)	R	2007–2008	5	0	0	0	0	—	—	—	—	—
Rusty Fitzgerald	(United States)	C	1994–1996	25	2	2	4	12	5	0	0	0	4
John Flesch	(Canada)	R	1977–1978	29	7	5	12	19	—	—	—	—	—
Ron Flockhart	(Canada)	C	1983–1985	80	27	23	50	44	—	—	—	—	—
Dan Focht	(Canada)	D	2002–2004	64	2	6	8	124	—	—	—	—	—
Bryan Fogarty	(Canada)	D	1992–1993	12	0	4	4	4	—	—	—	—	—
Val Fonteyne	(Canada)	L	1967–1972	349	39	82	121	4	14	0	2	2	2
Corey Foster	(Canada)	D	1995–1996	11	2	2	4	2	3	0	0	0	4
Gregory Fox	(Canada)	D	1983–1985	75	4	10	14	92	—	—	—	—	—
Ron Francis	(Canada)	C	1990–1998	533	164	449	613	295	97	32	68	100	67
William Frawley	(Canada)	R	1985–1989	240	33	37	70	610	—	—	—	—	—
Mark Friedman	(Canada)	D	2020–2023	54	4	7	11	43	6	1	0	1	0
Maxim Galanov	(Russia)	D	1998–1999	51	4	3	7	14	1	0	0	0	0
Alex Galchenyuk	(United States)	L	2019-2020	45	5	12	17	10	0	0	0	0	0
Perry Ganchar	(Canada)	R	1987–1989	33	2	5	7	36	—	—	—	—	—
Paul Gardner	(Canada)	C	1980–1984	207	98	105	203	105	10	2	5	7	10
Robert Garner	(Canada)	C	1982–1983	1	0	0	0	0	—	—	—	—	—
Steve Gatzos	(Canada)	R	1981–1985	89	15	20	35	83	1	0	0	0	0
Cameron Gaunce	(Canada)	D	2016–2017	12	1	3	4	13	—	—	—	—	—
Frederick Gaudreau	(Canada)	C	2020–2021	19	2	8	10	2	6	1	2	3	2
Robert Geale	(Canada)	C	1984–1985	1	0	0	0	2	—	—	—	—	—
Brian Gibbons	(United States)	C	2013–2014	41	5	12	17	6	8	2	1	3	2
Lee Giffin	(Canada)	R	1986–1988	27	1	3	4	9	—	—	—	—	—
Ed Gilbert	(Canada)	C	1975–1977	45	1	1	2	0	—	—	—	—	—
Stan Gilbertson	(United States)	L	1975–1977	115	19	17	36	19	3	1	1	2	2
Randy Gilhen	(Canada)	C	1989–1991	133	20	21	41	105	16	1	0	1	14
Hal Gill	(United States)	D	2007–2009	80	3	11	14	69	44	0	3	3	18
Samuel Girard	(Canada)	D	2025–2026	20	0	7	7	8	6	0	0	0	4
Robert Gladney	(Canada)	D	1983–1984	13	1	5	6	2	—	—	—	—	—
Cody Glass	(Canada)	C	2024–2025	51	4	11	15	12	—	—	—	—	—
Tanner Glass	(Canada)	L	2012–2014	115	5	10	15	152	13	1	0	1	8
Marcel Goc	(Germany)	C	2013–2015	55	2	6	8	8	9	0	1	1	4
Eric Godard	(Canada)	R	2008–2011	135	3	7	10	352	—	—	—	—	—
Dave Goertz	(Canada)	D	1987–1988	2	0	0	0	2	—	—	—	—	—
Alex Goligoski	(United States)	D	2007–2011	177	23	67	90	68	15	2	8	10	2
Sergei Gonchar	(Russia)	D	2005–2010	322	54	205	259	313	60	7	37	44	26
Steve Gotaas	(Canada)	C	1987–1988	36	5	6	11	45	—	—	—	—	—
Pat Graham	(Canada)	L	1981–1983	62	7	13	20	71	4	0	0	0	2
Mikael Granlund	(Finland)	C	2022–2023	21	1	4	5	8	—	—	—	—	—
Derek Grant	(Canada)	C	2018–2019	25	2	3	5	6	—	—	—	—	—
Ryan Graves	(Canada)	D	2023–2026	153	5	14	19	69	—	—	—	—	—
Tuomas Gronman	(Finland)	D	1997–1998	22	1	2	3	25	1	0	0	0	0
Jonathan Gruden	(United States)	C	2022–2024	16	1	0	1	5	—	—	—	—	—
Kenneth Gruhl	(Canada)	L	1987–1988	6	1	0	1	0	—	—	—	—	—
Matt Grzelcyk	(United States)	D	2024–2025	82	1	39	40	16	—	—	—	—	—
Erik Gudbranson	(Canada)	D	2018–2020	26	0	2	2	8	4	1	0	1	2
Nate Guenin	(United States)	D	2009–2010	2	0	0	0	0	—	—	—	—	—
Jake Guentzel	(United States)	C	2016–2024	503	219	247	466	224	58	34	24	58	26
Bill Guerin	(United States)	R	2008–2010	95	26	31	57	93	35	11	13	24	17
Vic Hadfield	(Canada)	L	1974–1977	163	61	79	140	118	12	5	2	7	11
Carl Hagelin	(Sweden)	L	2015–2019	195	27	56	83	74	48	10	11	21	35
Ron Hainsey	(United States)	D	2016–2017	16	0	3	3	4	25	2	6	8	4
Anders Hakansson	(Sweden)	L	1982–1983	62	9	12	21	26	—	—	—	—	—
Adam Hall	(United States)	R	2007–2008	46	2	4	6	24	17	3	1	4	8
Filip Hallander	(Sweden)	C	2021–2026	16	1	3	4	2	—	—	—	—	—
James Hamilton	(Canada)	R	1977–1985	95	14	18	32	28	6	3	0	3	0
David Hannan	(Canada)	C	1981–1989	355	60	88	148	530	8	0	1	1	4
Nick Harbaruk	(Canada)	R	1969–1973	308	40	61	101	257	14	3	1	4	20
Jansen Harkins	(United States)	C	2023–2024	45	0	4	4	21	—	—	—	—	—
Scott Harrington	(Canada)	D	2014–2015	10	0	0	0	4	—	—	—	—	—
Billy Harris	(Canada)	C	1968–1969	54	7	13	20	8	—	—	—	—	—
Rafael Harvey-Pinard	(Canada)	L	2025–2026	1	0	0	0	0	—	—	—	—	—
Kevin Hatcher	(United States)	D	1996–1999	220	45	95	140	193	24	4	4	8	20
Greg Hawgood	(Canada)	D	1993–1995	33	2	6	8	33	1	0	0	0	0
Avery Hayes	(United States)	F	2025–2026	16	5	0	5	12	—	—	—	—	—
Kevin Hayes	(United States)	C	2024–2026	92	17	14	31	16	—	—	—	—	—
Danton Heinen	(Canada)	C	2021–2023; 2024–2026	182	30	38	68	36	7	3	0	3	4
Shawn Heins	(Canada)	D	2002–2003	27	1	1	2	33	—	—	—	—	—
Bryan Hextall Jr.	(Canada)	C	1969–1974	335	71	115	186	498	14	0	3	3	43
Bill Hicke	(Canada)	R	1971–1972	12	2	0	2	6	—	—	—	—	—
Alex Hicks	(Canada)	L	1996–1998	113	12	28	40	130	11	0	1	1	4
Wayne Hicks	(United States)	R	1967–1968	15	4	7	11	2	—	—	—	—	—
Andy Hilbert	(United States)	L	2005–2006	19	7	11	18	16	—	—	—	—	—
Randy Hillier	(Canada)	D	1984–1991	343	13	79	92	594	17	0	1	1	73
Vinnie Hinostroza	(United States)	C	2023–2024	14	1	2	3	4	—	—	—	—	—
Todd Hlushko	(Canada)	L	1998–1999	—	—	—	—	—	2	0	0	0	0
Brian Holzinger	(United States)	C	2002–2004	70	7	17	24	44	—	—	—	—	—
Patric Hornqvist	(Sweden)	R	2014–2020	407	132	132	264	222	66	22	16	38	60
Tim Horton	(Canada)	D	1971–1972	44	2	9	11	40	4	0	1	1	2
Marian Hossa	(Slovakia)	R	2007–2008	12	3	7	10	6	20	12	14	26	12
Gregory Hotham	(Canada)	D	1981–1985	170	11	63	74	118	5	0	3	3	6
Jan Hrdina	(Czech Republic)	C	1998–2003	366	79	148	227	215	40	10	14	24	22
Jiri Hrdina	(Czechoslovakia)	C	1990–1992	93	9	27	36	29	34	2	4	6	22
Tim Hrynewich	(Canada)	L	1982–1984	55	6	8	14	82	—	—	—	—	—
Alexander Hudson	(Canada)	D	1978–1979	2	0	0	0	0	2	0	0	0	0
Mike Hudson	(Canada)	C	1994–1995	40	2	9	11	34	11	0	0	0	6
Patrick Hughes	(Canada)	R	1979–1981	134	28	23	51	239	5	0	0	0	21
David Hunter	(Canada)	L	1987–1988	59	11	18	29	77	—	—	—	—	—
Matt Hunwick	(United States)	D	2017–2018	42	4	6	10	21	—	—	—	—	—
Matt Hussey	(United States)	C	2003–2006	16	2	2	4	0	—	—	—	—	—
Andrew Hutchinson	(United States)	D	2010–2011	5	0	1	1	6	—	—	—	—	—
Jarome Iginla	(Canada)	R	2012–2013	13	5	6	11	9	15	4	8	12	16
Victor Ignatjev	(Latvia)	D	1998–1999	11	0	1	1	6	1	0	0	0	2
Boko Imama	(Canada)	L	2024–2026	18	1	0	1	35	—	—	—	—	—
Earl Ingarfield	(Canada)	C	1967–1969	90	23	37	60	16	—	—	—	—	—
Rick Jackman	(Canada)	D	2003–2006	74	13	39	52	60	—	—	—	—	—
Jaromir Jagr	(Czech Republic)	R	1990–2001	806	439	640	1079	593	140	65	82	147	121
John Jakopin	(Canada)	D	2001–2002	19	0	4	4	42	—	—	—	—	—
Connor James	(Canada)	L	2007–2009	14	1	0	1	2	—	—	—	—	—
Mark Jankowski	(Canada)	C	2020–2021	45	4	7	11	6	—	—	—	—	—
Arto Javanainen	(Finland)	R	1984–1985	14	4	1	5	2	—	—	—	—	—
Dustin Jeffrey	(Canada)	C	2008–2014	100	15	13	28	10	—	—	—	—	—
Grant Jennings	(Canada)	D	1990–1995	210	7	21	28	357	38	1	1	2	38
Andreas Johansson	(Sweden)	L	1996–1998	77	7	17	24	40	1	0	0	0	0
Mathias Johansson	(Sweden)	C	2002–2003	12	1	5	6	4	—	—	—	—	—
Adam Johnson	(United States)	C	2018–2020	13	1	3	4	2	—	—	—	—	—
Greg Johnson	(Canada)	C	1996–1998	37	8	9	17	16	5	1	0	1	2
Jack Johnson	(United States)	D	2018–2020	149	4	20	24	67	7	0	0	0	6
Jim Johnson	(United States)	D	1985–1991	390	14	95	109	658	11	0	5	5	44
Mark Johnson	(United States)	C	1979–1982	136	23	39	62	84	10	4	3	7	6
Nick Johnson	(Canada)	R	2009–2011	10	2	3	5	7	—	—	—	—	—
Marc Johnstone	(United States)	F	2023–2024	1	0	0	0	0	—	—	—	—	—
Jussi Jokinen	(Finland)	L	2012–2014	91	28	40	68	24	21	7	6	13	14
Stan Jonathan	(Canada)	L	1982–1983	19	0	3	3	13	—	—	—	—	—
Caleb Jones	(United States)	D	2025–2026	7	0	1	1	0	—	—	—	—	—
Ron Jones	(Canada)	D	1973–1974	25	0	3	3	15	—	—	—	—	—
Hans Jonsson	(Sweden)	D	1999–2003	242	10	38	48	92	27	0	1	1	14
Josh Jooris	(Canada)	C	2017–2018	9	0	0	0	0	—	—	—	—	—
Chris Joseph	(Canada)	D	1987–1996	120	10	28	38	129	25	2	1	3	20
P O Joseph	(Canada)	D	2020–2025	171	8	30	38	88	—	—	—	—	—
Mark Kachowski	(Canada)	L	1987–1990	64	6	5	11	209	—	—	—	—	—
Dominik Kahun	(Germany)	C	2019–2020	6	2	2	4	0	—	—	—	—	—
Sheldon Kannegiesser	(Canada)	D	1970–1973	75	2	6	8	76	—	—	—	—	—
Kasperi Kapanen	(Finland)	R	2020–2023	162	29	53	82	31	13	1	5	6	2
Ladislav Karabin	(Slovakia)	L	1993–1994	9	0	0	0	2	—	—	—	—	—
Erik Karlsson	(Sweden)	D	2023–2026	239	37	138	175	86	6	1	2	3	10
Darius Kasparaitis	(Lithuania)	D	1996–2002	405	15	68	83	661	38	2	2	4	50
Rick Kehoe	(Canada)	R	1974–1985	722	312	324	636	88	37	4	17	21	2
John Kelly	(Canada)	R	1973–1977	250	69	85	154	462	15	6	3	9	23
Tyler Kennedy	(Canada)	R	2007–2013	372	76	92	168	181	76	12	15	27	25
Danny Kesa	(Canada)	R	1998–1999	67	2	8	10	27	13	1	0	1	0
Phil Kessel	(United States)	R	2015–2019	328	110	193	303	102	65	20	36	56	10
Rick Kessell	(Canada)	C	1969–1973	84	2	18	20	2	—	—	—	—	—
Ben Kindel	(Canada)	C	2025–2026	77	17	18	35	18	6	0	0	0	0
Orest Kindrachuk	(Canada)	C	1978–1981	144	38	80	118	181	7	4	1	5	7
Petr Klima	(Czech Republic)	R	1996–1997	9	1	3	4	4	—	—	—	—	—
Rob Klinkhammer	(Canada)	L	2014–2015	10	1	2	3	0	—	—	—	—	—
Chuck Kobasew	(Canada)	R	2013–2014	33	2	0	2	15	—	—	—	—	—
Ville Koivunen	(Finland)	R	2024–2026	47	2	12	14	14	—	—	—	—	—
Konstantin Koltsov	(Belarus)	L	2002–2006	144	12	26	38	50	—	—	—	—	—
Vladislav Kolyachonok	(Belarus)	D	2024–2025	12	0	2	2	8	—	—	—	—	—
George Konik	(Canada)	D	1967–1968	52	7	8	15	26	—	—	—	—	—
Chris Kontos	(Canada)	C	1986–1988	67	9	16	25	18	—	—	—	—	—
Joona Koppanen	(Finland)	L	2023–2026	28	1	1	2	2	—	—	—	—	—
Tom Kostopoulos	(Canada)	R	2001–2004	79	10	16	26	76	—	—	—	—	—
Alex Kovalev	(Russia)	R	1998–2011	365	151	203	354	373	46	12	18	30	50
Milan Kraft	(Czech Republic)	C	2000–2004	207	41	41	82	52	8	0	0	0	2
Frantisek Kucera	(Czech Republic)	D	2000–2001	7	0	2	2	0	—	—	—	—	—
Tom Kuhnhackl	(Germany)	R	2015–2018	168	11	28	39	48	47	3	4	7	8
Brett Kulak	(Canada)	D	2025–2026	25	1	6	7	18	—	—	—	—	—
Dmitry Kulikov	(Russia)	D	2022–2023	6	0	1	1	4	—	—	—	—	—
Chris Kunitz	(Canada)	L	2008–2017	569	169	219	388	389	126	23	53	76	113
Joel Kwiatkowski	(Canada)	D	2006–2007	1	0	0	0	0	—	—	—	—	—
James Kyte	(Canada)	D	1989–1991	57	3	1	4	127	—	—	—	—	—
Yvon Labre	(Canada)	D	1970–1974	37	2	3	5	32	—	—	—	—	—
Dan Lacouture	(United States)	L	2000–2003	137	8	13	21	157	5	0	0	0	2
Sam Lafferty	(United States)	C	2019–2022	94	6	15	21	60	1	0	0	0	0
Pete Laframboise	(Canada)	L	1974–1975	35	5	13	18	8	9	1	0	1	0
Jean-Guy Lagace	(Canada)	D	1968–1975	106	4	20	24	119	—	—	—	—	—
Robert Lalonde	(Canada)	C	1972–1975	106	10	20	30	16	—	—	—	—	—
Mitch Lamoureux	(Canada)	C	1983–1985	70	11	9	20	59	—	—	—	—	—
Robert Lang	(Czech Republic)	C	1997–2002	345	103	158	261	96	45	7	12	19	6
Ted Lanyon	(Canada)	D	1967–1968	5	0	0	0	4	—	—	—	—	—
Maxim Lapierre	(Canada)	C	2014–2015	35	0	2	2	16	5	0	0	0	0
Georges Laraque	(Canada)	R	2006–2008	88	4	11	15	159	17	1	2	3	4
Pierre Larouche	(Canada)	C	1974–1978	240	119	134	253	99	15	2	9	11	2
Brad Lauer	(Canada)	R	1995–1996	21	4	1	5	6	12	1	1	2	4
Janne Laukkanen	(Finland)	D	1999–2003	125	11	37	48	82	29	4	6	10	24
Kevin Lavallee	(Canada)	L	1986–1987	33	8	20	28	4	—	—	—	—	—
Jamie Leach	(Canada)	R	1989–1993	60	7	7	14	10	—	—	—	—	—
Stephen Leach	(United States)	R	1999–2000	56	2	3	5	24	—	—	—	—	—
Patrick Lebeau	(Canada)	L	1998–1999	8	1	0	1	2	—	—	—	—	—
Bill Lecaine	(Canada)	L	1968–1969	4	0	0	0	0	—	—	—	—	—
John LeClair	(United States)	L	2005–2007	94	24	34	58	73	—	—	—	—	—
Douglas Lecuyer	(Canada)	L	1982–1983	12	1	4	5	12	—	—	—	—	—
Peter Lee	(Canada)	R	1977–1983	431	114	131	245	257	19	0	8	8	4
Guillaume Lefebvre	(Canada)	L	2002–2006	21	2	4	6	9	—	—	—	—	—
Petteri Lehto	(Finland)	D	1984–1985	6	0	0	0	4	—	—	—	—	—
Bobby Leiter	(Canada)	C	1971–1972	78	14	17	31	18	4	3	0	3	0
Alain Lemieux	(Canada)	C	1986–1987	1	0	0	0	0	—	—	—	—	—
Mario Lemieux	(Canada)	C	1984–2006	915	690	1033	1723	834	107	76	96	172	87
Jordan Leopold	(United States)	D	2009–2010	20	4	4	8	6	8	0	0	0	2
Francois Leroux	(Canada)	D	1994–1997	165	2	14	16	356	33	1	3	4	34
Kris Letang	(Canada)	D	2006–2026	1235	178	628	806	843	155	25	67	92	162
Mark Letestu	(Canada)	C	2009–2012	85	15	14	29	17	11	0	2	2	0
Pierre-Luc Letourneau-Leblond	(Canada)	R	2013–2014	1	0	0	0	0	—	—	—	—	—
Lynn Libett	(Canada)	L	1979–1981	121	20	18	38	18	5	1	1	2	0
Willy Lindstrom	(Sweden)	R	1985–1987	131	24	30	54	36	—	—	—	—	—
Richard Lintner	(Slovakia)	D	2002–2003	19	3	2	5	10	—	—	—	—	—
Jake Livanavage	(United States)	D	2025–2026	1	0	0	0	0	—	—	—	—	—
Blake Lizotte	(United States)	C	2024–2026	114	18	21	39	51	6	0	2	2	2
Troy Loney	(Canada)	L	1983–1993	532	69	100	169	980	66	8	14	22	97
Ross Lonsberry	(Canada)	L	1978–1981	236	56	73	129	150	17	2	3	5	13
Ben Lovejoy	(United States)	D	2008–2016	184	9	29	38	101	38	2	8	10	16
Darrin Lowe	(Canada)	R	1983–1984	8	1	2	3	0	—	—	—	—	—
John Ludvig	(Canada)	D	2023–2024	33	3	2	5	47	—	—	—	—	—
Bernie Lukowich	(Canada)	R	1973–1974	53	9	10	19	32	—	—	—	—	—
Brian Lundberg	(Canada)	D	1982–1983	1	0	0	0	2	—	—	—	—	—
Ross Lupaschuk	(Canada)	D	2002–2003	3	0	0	0	4	—	—	—	—	—
Gilles Lupien	(Canada)	D	1980–1981	31	0	1	1	34	—	—	—	—	—
Jack Lynch	(Canada)	D	1972–1974	64	1	25	26	61	—	—	—	—	—
Steve Lyon	(Canada)	D	1976–1977	3	0	0	0	2	—	—	—	—	—
Olli Maatta	(Finland)	D	2013–2019	362	25	82	107	98	69	2	19	21	20
Lowell MacDonald	(Canada)	L	1970–1978	328	140	166	306	60	15	6	4	10	8
Steve MacIntyre	(Canada)	L	2011–2013	13	0	0	0	18	—	—	—	—	—
Norm MacIver	(Canada)	D	1994–1996	45	2	30	32	38	12	1	4	5	8
Rick Macleish	(Canada)	C	1981–1983	46	13	17	30	30	5	1	1	2	0
Al MacNeil	(Canada)	D	1967–1968	74	2	10	12	58	—	—	—	—	—
Peter Mahovlich	(Canada)	C	1977–1979	117	39	75	114	76	2	0	1	1	0
Evgeni Malkin	(Russia)	C	2006–2026	1269	533	874	1407	1263	183	69	114	183	248
Ryan Malone	(United States)	L	2003–2008	299	87	82	169	301	25	6	10	16	25
Greg Malone	(Canada)	C	1976–1983	495	143	221	364	496	18	3	5	8	32
Kent Manderville	(Canada)	C	2001–2003	86	3	5	8	50	—	—	—	—	—
Jimmy Mann	(Canada)	R	1987–1988	9	0	0	0	53	—	—	—	—	—
Anthony Mantha	(Canada)	R	2025–2026	81	33	31	64	43	6	0	1	1	20
Moe Mantha	(United States)	D	1984–1988	232	37	131	168	223	—	—	—	—	—
John Marino	(United States)	D	2019–2022	189	10	54	64	51	17	0	2	2	10
Patrick Marleau	(Canada)	C	2019–2020	8	1	1	2	2	4	0	0	0	0
Paul Marshall	(Canada)	L	1979–1981	59	12	12	24	13	1	0	0	0	0
Paul Martin	(United States)	D	2010–2015	297	17	92	109	80	43	3	21	24	14
Mike Matheson	(Canada)	D	2020–2022	118	16	31	47	61	13	1	5	6	6
Dwight Mathiasen	(Canada)	R	1985–1988	33	1	7	8	18	—	—	—	—	—
Dick Mattiussi	(Canada)	D	1967–1969	44	0	4	4	32	—	—	—	—	—
Bryan Maxwell	(Canada)	D	1983–1985	89	3	20	23	141	—	—	—	—	—
Patrick Mayer	(United States)	D	1987–1988	1	0	0	0	4	—	—	—	—	—
Gary Mcadam	(Canada)	R	1978–1981	140	27	40	67	95	12	3	3	6	9
Andrew McBain	(Canada)	R	1989–1990	41	5	9	14	51	—	—	—	—	—
Dunc McCallum	(Canada)	D	1967–1971	185	14	35	49	228	10	1	2	3	12
Jared McCann	(Canada)	C	2018–2021	141	39	45	84	38	12	0	3	3	4
Kevin McCarthy	(Canada)	D	1983–1985	95	13	26	39	82	—	—	—	—	—
Kevin McClelland	(Canada)	R	1981–1984	72	8	12	20	139	5	1	1	2	5
Keith McCreary	(Canada)	R	1967–1972	292	82	59	141	199	11	0	4	4	6
Ab McDonald	(Canada)	L	1967–1968	74	22	21	43	38	—	—	—	—	—
Colin McDonald	(United States)	R	2011–2012	5	0	0	0	0	—	—	—	—	—
Joe McDonnell	(Canada)	D	1984–1986	43	2	9	11	22	—	—	—	—	—
Al McDonough	(Canada)	R	1971–1974	152	56	74	130	46	4	0	1	1	0
Shawn McEachern	(United States)	L	1991–1995	170	53	59	112	78	48	6	11	17	24
Jim McGeough	(Canada)	C	1984–1987	42	4	10	14	20	—	—	—	—	—
Brock McGinn	(Canada)	L	2021–2023	124	22	16	38	35	7	1	1	2	4
Rutger McGroarty	(United States)	R	2024–2026	32	4	5	9	4	—	—	—	—	—
Jay McKee	(Canada)	D	2009–2010	62	1	9	10	54	5	0	0	0	2
Greg McKegg	(Canada)	C	2017–2018	26	2	2	4	8	—	—	—	—	—
Steve McKenna	(Canada)	L	2000–2004	162	10	3	13	313	—	—	—	—	—
Brian McKenzie	(Canada)	L	1971–1972	6	1	1	2	4	—	—	—	—	—
Jim McKenzie	(Canada)	L	1993–1995	50	2	1	3	79	8	0	0	0	4
Dave McLlwain	(Canada)	C	1987–1996	108	14	14	28	48	9	0	1	1	0
Mike McMahon Jr.	(Canada)	D	1969–1970	12	1	3	4	19	—	—	—	—	—
Bob McManama	(United States)	C	1973–1976	99	11	25	36	28	8	0	1	1	6
Marty McSorley	(Canada)	D	1983–1994	134	5	25	30	378	—	—	—	—	—
Michael Meeker	(Canada)	R	1978–1979	4	0	0	0	5	—	—	—	—	—
Jayson Megna	(United States)	C	2013–2015	48	5	5	10	20	2	0	0	0	0
Ron Meighan	(Canada)	D	1982–1983	41	2	6	8	16	—	—	—	—	—
Josef Melichar	(Czech Republic)	D	2000–2007	310	7	33	40	263	5	0	0	0	2
Eric Meloche	(Canada)	R	2001–2004	61	8	9	17	32	—	—	—	—	—
Zbynek Michalek	(Czech Republic)	D	2010–2012	135	7	25	32	54	13	0	2	2	0
David Michayluk	(Canada)	L	1991–1992	—	—	—	—	—	7	1	1	2	0
Kevin Miller	(United States)	C	1995–1996	13	6	5	11	4	18	3	2	5	8
Kip Miller	(Canada)	C	1998–2001	154	26	46	72	38	13	2	7	9	19
Chris Minard	(Canada)	L	2007–2009	35	2	3	5	14	—	—	—	—	—
Dmitri Mironov	(Russia)	D	1995–1997	87	4	36	40	112	15	0	1	1	10
Carl Mokosak	(Canada)	L	1986–1987	3	0	0	0	4	—	—	—	—	—
Hartland Monahan	(Canada)	R	1977–1978	7	2	0	2	2	—	—	—	—	—
Dominic Moore	(Canada)	C	2006–2007	59	6	9	15	46	—	—	—	—	—
Ian Moran	(United States)	D	1995–2003	433	19	44	63	281	61	1	6	7	20
Aleksey Morozov	(Russia)	R	1997–2004	451	84	135	219	98	39	4	5	9	8
Jim Morrison	(Canada)	D	1969–1971	132	5	25	30	72	8	0	3	3	10
Lew Morrison	(Canada)	R	1974–1978	214	13	13	26	12	13	0	0	0	0
Brenden Morrow	(Canada)	L	2012–2013	15	6	8	14	19	14	2	2	4	8
Kael Mouillierat	(Canada)	L	2015–2016	1	0	0	0	2	—	—	—	—	—
Joe Mullen	(United States)	R	1990–1997	379	153	172	325	101	62	16	15	31	20
Glenn Mulvenna	(Canada)	C	1991–1992	1	0	0	0	2	—	—	—	—	—
Paul Mulvey	(Canada)	L	1981–1982	27	1	7	8	76	—	—	—	—	—
Craig Muni	(Canada)	D	1996–1997	64	0	4	4	36	3	0	0	0	0
Matt Murley	(United States)	L	2003–2006	59	2	6	8	38	—	—	—	—	—
Larry Murphy	(Canada)	D	1990–1995	336	78	223	301	213	74	15	57	72	73
Douglas Murray	(Sweden)	D	2012–2013	14	1	2	3	9	15	2	1	3	32
Glen Murray	(Canada)	R	1995–1997	135	25	26	51	81	18	2	6	8	10
Troy Murray	(Canada)	C	1994–1995	13	0	2	2	23	12	2	1	3	12
Markus Naslund	(Sweden)	L	1993–1996	151	25	42	67	65	—	—	—	—	—
Alain Nasreddine	(Canada)	D	2005–2008	56	1	4	5	30	—	—	—	—	—
James Neal	(Canada)	L	2010–2014	199	89	95	184	174	38	11	11	22	50
Pat Neaton	(United States)	D	1993–1994	9	1	1	2	12	—	—	—	—	—
Petr Nedved	(Czech Republic)	C	1995–1997	154	78	92	170	134	23	11	12	23	28
Mike Needham	(Canada)	R	1992–1994	81	9	5	14	16	14	2	0	2	4
Todd Nelson	(Canada)	D	1991–1992	1	0	0	0	0	—	—	—	—	—
Ville Nieminen	(Finland)	L	2001–2003	88	10	14	24	101	—	—	—	—	—
Matthew Nieto	(United States)	L	2023–2025	54	2	5	7	8	—	—	—	—	—
Matt Niskanen	(United States)	D	2010–2014	214	19	66	85	130	39	3	12	15	25
Stefan Noesen	(United States)	RW	2019–2020	6	1	0	1	0	—	—	—	—	—
Theodore Nolan	(Canada)	R	1985–1986	18	1	1	2	34	—	—	—	—	—
Simon Nolet	(Canada)	R	1975–1976	39	9	8	17	2	3	0	0	0	0
Niklas Nordgren	(Sweden)	L	2005–2006	15	0	0	0	4	—	—	—	—	—
Joe Noris	(United States)	C	1971–1972	35	2	5	7	20	—	—	—	—	—
Jeffrey Norton	(United States)	D	2000–2001	32	2	10	12	20	—	—	—	—	—
Thomas Novak	(United States)	C	2024–2026	84	16	26	42	24	6	0	2	2	0
Hank Nowak	(Canada)	L	1973–1974	13	0	0	0	11	—	—	—	—	—
Alexander Nylander	(Sweden)	L	2022–2024	14	1	1	2	6	—	—	—	—	—
Drew O'Connor	(United States)	F	2020–2025	210	30	36	66	54	2	0	0	0	0
Thomas O'Regan	(United States)	C	1983–1986	61	5	12	17	10	—	—	—	—	—
Cal O'Reilly	(Canada)	C	2011–2012	6	0	1	1	0	—	—	—	—	—
Lyle Odelein	(Canada)	D	2005–2006	27	0	1	1	50	—	—	—	—	—
Roman Oksiuta	(Russia)	R	1996–1997	7	0	0	0	4	—	—	—	—	—
Fredrik Olausson	(Sweden)	D	1996–1998	127	13	47	60	66	10	0	4	4	2
Eddie Olczyk	(United States)	R	1996–1998	68	15	18	33	41	11	3	0	3	16
Jamie Oleksiak	(Canada)	D	2017–2019	83	8	17	25	106	12	1	0	1	7
Steve Oleksy	(United States)	D	2016–2017	11	0	1	1	24	—	—	—	—	—
Krzysztof Oliwa	(Poland)	L	2000–2002	83	1	4	5	281	5	0	0	0	16
Brooks Orpik	(United States)	D	2002–2014	703	13	119	132	734	92	2	13	15	88
Michel Ouellet	(Canada)	R	2005–2007	123	35	45	80	46	5	0	2	2	6
Dennis Owchar	(Canada)	D	1974–1978	168	18	49	67	146	8	0	1	1	6
Jim Paek	(Canada)	D	1990–1994	170	4	26	30	117	27	1	4	5	8
Wilf Paiement	(Canada)	R	1987–1988	23	2	6	8	39	—	—	—	—	—
Ziggy Palffy	(Slovakia)	R	2005–2006	42	11	31	42	12	—	—	—	—	—
Bob Paradise	(United States)	D	1973–1979	203	7	33	40	209	8	0	1	1	17
Richard Park	(United States)	R	1994–2012	112	11	14	25	50	6	0	1	1	4
Ed Patterson	(Canada)	R	1993–1997	68	3	3	6	56	—	—	—	—	—
Adam Payerl	(Canada)	C	2013–2014	2	0	0	0	2	—	—	—	—	—
Mel Pearson	(Canada)	L	1967–1968	2	0	1	1	0	—	—	—	—	—
Tanner Pearson	(Canada)	L	2018–2019	44	9	5	14	13	—	—	—	—	—
Barry Pederson	(Canada)	C	1989–1991	84	10	26	36	50	—	—	—	—	—
David Perron	(Canada)	L	2015–2016	86	16	22	38	70	5	0	1	1	4
Janne Pesonen	(Finland)	L	2008–2009	7	0	0	0	0	—	—	—	—	—
Toby Petersen	(United States)	C	2000–2002	91	10	16	26	8	—	—	—	—	—
Ronald Petrovicky	(Slovakia)	R	2006–2007	31	3	3	6	28	3	0	0	0	2
Jeff Petry	(United States)	D	2022–2023	61	5	26	31	24	—	—	—	—	—
Marcus Pettersson	(Sweden)	D	2018–2025	442	16	125	141	271	21	0	4	4	10
Matthew Phillips	(Canada)	F	2023–2024	3	0	0	0	0	—	—	—	—	—
Alexandre Picard	(Canada)	D	2011–2012	17	0	4	4	4	—	—	—	—	—
Owen Pickering	(Canada)	D	2024–2026	29	1	2	3	8	—	—	—	—	—
Lasse Pirjeta	(Finland)	L	2003–2006	38	10	9	19	18	—	—	—	—	—
Domenic Pittis	(Canada)	C	1996–1997	1	0	0	0	0	—	—	—	—	—
Sergei Plotnikov	(Russia)	L	2015–2016	32	0	2	2	20	—	—	—	—	—
Steve Poapst	(Canada)	D	2005–2006	21	0	4	4	10	—	—	—	—	—
Ryan Poehling	(United States)	C	2022–2023	53	7	7	14	8	—	—	—	—	—
Greg Polis	(Canada)	R	1970–1974	256	88	70	158	146	4	0	2	2	0
Alexei Ponikarovsky	(Ukraine)	L	2009–2010	16	2	7	9	17	11	1	4	5	4
Vasiliy Ponomarev	(Russia)	C	2024–2025	7	0	0	0	2	—	—	—	—	—
Peter Popovic	(Sweden)	D	1999–2000	54	1	5	6	30	10	0	0	0	10
Kevin Porter	(United States)	C	2015–2017	43	0	3	3	0	—	—	—	—	—
Corey Potter	(United States)	D	2010–2011	1	0	0	0	0	—	—	—	—	—
Samuel Poulin	(Canada)	R	2022–2026	15	0	2	2	6	—	—	—	—	—
Derrick Pouliot	(Canada)	D	2014–2017	67	2	12	14	10	2	0	0	0	2
Kelly Pratt	(Canada)	R	1974–1975	22	0	6	6	15	—	—	—	—	—
Tracy Pratt	(United States)	D	1968–1970	83	5	12	17	158	10	0	1	1	51
Dean Prentice	(Canada)	L	1969–1971	144	47	42	89	32	10	2	5	7	8
Noel Price	(Canada)	D	1967–1969	143	8	45	53	109	—	—	—	—	—
Pat Price	(Canada)	D	1980–1983	128	8	52	60	459	10	1	1	2	49
Tom Price	(Canada)	D	1976–1979	19	0	2	2	8	—	—	—	—	—
Ken Priestlay	(Canada)	C	1990–1992	51	2	9	11	4	—	—	—	—	—
Wayne Primeau	(Canada)	C	2000–2003	131	9	24	33	127	18	1	3	4	2
Sean Pronger	(Canada)	C	1997–1999	7	1	0	1	2	5	0	0	0	4
Jean Pronovost	(Canada)	R	1968–1978	753	316	287	603	306	29	9	9	18	12
Jesse Puljujärvi	(Finland)	R	2023–2025	48	6	7	13	16	—	—	—	—	—
Jamie Pushor	(Canada)	D	2001–2003	91	3	3	6	106	—	—	—	—	—
Valtteri Puustinen	(Finland)	R	2021–2025	66	7	17	24	10	—	—	—	—	—
Taylor Pyatt	(Canada)	L	2013–2014	34	4	0	4	10	—	—	—	—	—
Dan Quinn	(Canada)	C	1986–1997	270	111	165	276	224	11	6	3	9	10
Rickard Rakell	(Sweden)	R	2021–2026	312	106	122	228	64	8	1	3	4	0
Michael Ramsey	(United States)	D	1992–1994	77	3	4	7	30	13	0	6	6	4
Ryan Reaves	(Canada)	R	2017–2018	58	4	4	8	84	—	—	—	—	—
Mark Recchi	(Canada)	R	1988–2008	389	154	231	385	300	29	10	28	38	33
Dylan Reese	(United States)	D	2012–2013	3	0	0	0	0	—	—	—	—	—
Stephane Richer	(Canada)	R	2001–2002	58	13	12	25	14	—	—	—	—	—
Juuso Riikola	(Finland)	D	2018–2022	80	3	10	13	18	—	—	—	—	—
Gary Rissling	(Canada)	L	1980–1985	184	20	26	46	832	5	0	1	1	4
Jani Rita	(Finland)	L	2005–2006	30	3	4	7	4	—	—	—	—	—
Bob Rivard	(Canada)	C	1967–1968	27	5	12	17	4	—	—	—	—	—
Rene Robert	(Canada)	R	1971–1972	49	7	11	18	42	—	—	—	—	—
Gary Roberts	(Canada)	L	2006–2008	57	10	18	28	66	16	4	4	8	34
Gordon Roberts	(United States)	D	1990–1992	134	5	34	39	157	43	1	4	5	95
Luc Robitaille	(Canada)	L	1994–1995	46	23	19	42	37	12	7	4	11	26
Randy Robitaille	(Canada)	C	2001–2003	81	15	32	47	24	—	—	—	—	—
Dave Roche	(Canada)	L	1995–1997	132	12	12	24	285	16	2	7	9	26
Evan Rodrigues	(Canada)	C	2019–2022	124	27	31	58	24	9	3	3	6	4
Tom Roulston	(Canada)	C	1983–1986	58	11	17	28	10	—	—	—	—	—
Mike Rowe	(Canada)	D	1984–1987	11	0	0	0	11	—	—	—	—	—
Carter Rowney	(Canada)	C	2016–2018	71	5	7	12	8	23	0	3	3	4
Andre Roy	(Canada)	R	2005–2007	47	2	1	3	128	—	—	—	—	—
Michal Rozsival	(Czech Republic)	D	1999–2003	237	18	47	65	161	2	0	0	0	4
Chad Ruhwedel	(United States)	D	2016–2024	326	13	34	47	90	25	0	0	0	6
Duane Rupp	(Canada)	D	1968–1973	265	21	83	104	170	10	2	2	4	8
Mike Rupp	(United States)	L	2009–2011	162	22	14	36	244	18	1	1	2	12
Terry Ruskowski	(Canada)	C	1985–1987	143	40	74	114	307	—	—	—	—	—
Bryan Rust	(United States)	R	2014–2026	710	232	270	502	231	85	22	15	37	36
Jan Rutta	(Czech Republic)	D	2022–2023	56	3	6	9	30	—	—	—	—	—
Jarkko Ruutu	(Finland)	L	2006–2008	152	13	19	32	263	25	2	1	3	36
Rocky Saganiuk	(Canada)	R	1983–1984	29	1	3	4	37	—	—	—	—	—
Kjell Samuelsson	(Sweden)	D	1991–1995	183	10	22	32	312	44	0	7	7	72
Mikael Samuelsson	(Sweden)	R	2002–2003	22	2	0	2	8	—	—	—	—	—
Philip Samuelsson	(Sweden)	D	2013–2014	5	0	0	0	0	—	—	—	—	—
Ulf Samuelsson	(Sweden)	D	1990–1995	277	11	83	94	804	66	4	12	16	123
Derek Sanderson	(Canada)	C	1977–1978	13	3	1	4	0	—	—	—	—	—
Tomas Sandstrom	(Sweden)	R	1993–1997	172	71	84	155	168	36	7	5	12	50
Grant Sasser	(United States)	C	1983–1984	3	0	0	0	0	—	—	—	—	—
Miroslav Satan	(Slovakia)	R	2008–2009	65	17	19	36	36	17	1	5	6	11
Glen Sather	(Canada)	L	1969–1971	122	20	17	37	210	10	0	2	2	17
Ryan Savoia	(Canada)	C	1998–1999	3	0	0	0	0	—	—	—	—	—
Colton Sceviour	(Canada)	C	2020–2021	46	5	5	10	2	—	—	—	—	—
Ken Schinkel	(Canada)	R	1967–1973	371	93	143	236	86	13	6	1	7	4
Norm Schmidt	(Canada)	D	1983–1988	125	23	33	56	73	—	—	—	—	—
Ron Schock	(Canada)	C	1969–1977	619	124	280	404	201	29	2	12	14	23
Dwight Schofield	(United States)	D	1986–1987	25	1	6	7	59	—	—	—	—	—
Dave Schultz	(Canada)	L	1977–1979	113	13	34	47	535	—	—	—	—	—
Justin Schultz	(Canada)	D	2015–2020	234	22	91	113	60	56	6	23	29	6
Rodney Schutt	(Canada)	L	1978–1984	278	77	92	169	177	22	8	6	14	26
Rob Scuderi	(United States)	D	2003–2016	460	4	53	57	131	75	1	7	8	16
Jeff Serowik	(United States)	D	1998–1999	26	0	6	6	16	—	—	—	—	—
Tom Sestito	(United States)	L	2015–2017	17	0	3	3	67	—	—	—	—	—
Eddie Shack	(Canada)	L	1971–1973	92	30	29	59	96	4	0	1	1	15
Ryan Shea	(United States)	D	2023–2026	150	9	32	41	42	6	0	1	1	2
Riley Sheahan	(Canada)	C	2017–2019	122	18	23	41	17	12	1	2	3	2
Conor Sheary	(United States)	L	2015–2018; 2019–2020	192	49	48	97	42	61	6	15	21	16
Douglas Shedden	(Canada)	C	1981–1986	332	123	159	282	148	—	—	—	—	—
Gregg Sheppard	(Canada)	C	1978–1982	241	50	73	123	113	17	4	7	11	2
Jim Shires	(Canada)	L	1972–1973	18	1	2	3	2	—	—	—	—	—
Zach Sill	(Canada)	C	2013–2015	62	1	2	3	72	—	—	—	—	—
Jon Sim	(Canada)	L	2003–2004	15	2	3	5	6	—	—	—	—	—
Roman Simicek	(Czech Republic)	C	2000–2001	29	3	6	9	30	—	—	—	—	—
Charlie Simmer	(Canada)	L	1987–1988	50	11	17	28	24	—	—	—	—	—
Dominik Simon	(Czech Republic)	L	2015–2020; 2021–2022	228	22	51	73	74	12	0	4	4	4
Craig Simpson	(Canada)	L	1985–1988	169	50	55	105	140	—	—	—	—	—
Reid Simpson	(Canada)	L	2003–2004	2	0	0	0	17	—	—	—	—	—
Robert Simpson	(Canada)	L	1981–1983	30	10	9	19	4	2	0	0	0	0
Ville Siren	(Finland)	D	1985–1989	199	11	45	56	158	—	—	—	—	—
Michal Sivek	(Czech Republic)	C	2002–2003	38	3	3	6	14	—	—	—	—	—
Martin Skoula	(Czech Republic)	D	2009–2010	33	3	5	8	6	—	—	—	—	—
Pavel Skrbek	(Czech Republic)	D	1998–1999	4	0	0	0	2	—	—	—	—	—
John Slaney	(Canada)	D	1999–2000	29	1	4	5	10	2	1	0	1	2
Jiri Slegr	(Czech Republic)	D	1997–2001	252	24	62	86	337	29	3	10	13	33
Douglas Smith	(Canada)	C	1989–1990	10	1	1	2	25	—	—	—	—	—
Nathan Smith	(Canada)	C	2007–2008	13	0	0	0	2	—	—	—	—	—
Reilly Smith	(Canada)	R	2023–2024	76	13	27	40	18	—	—	—	—	—
Trevor Smith	(Canada)	C	2012–2013	1	0	0	0	0	—	—	—	—	—
Ty Smith	(Canada)	D	2022–2023	9	1	3	4	4	—	—	—	—	—
Bryan Smolinski	(United States)	C	1995–1996	81	24	40	64	69	18	5	4	9	10
Carl Sneep	(United States)	D	2011–2012	1	0	1	1	0	—	—	—	—	—
Ron Snell	(Canada)	R	1968–1970	7	3	2	5	6	—	—	—	—	—
Ted Snell	(Canada)	R	1973–1974	55	4	12	16	8	—	—	—	—	—
Elmer Soderblom	(Sweden)	R	2025–2026	20	5	5	10	11	5	1	0	1	0
Ilya Solovyov	(Belarus)	D	2025–2026	14	0	5	5	10	3	0	0	0	0
Martin Sonnenberg	(Canada)	L	1998–2000	58	2	3	5	19	7	0	0	0	0
Nick Spaling	(Canada)	C	2014–2015	82	9	18	27	26	5	1	1	2	4
Bill Speer	(Canada)	D	1967–1969	102	4	17	21	71	—	—	—	—	—
Brian Spencer	(Canada)	L	1977–1979	86	9	11	20	81	—	—	—	—	—
Daniel Sprong	(Netherlands)	R	2015–2019	42	4	5	9	0	—	—	—	—	—
John St. Ivany	(United States)	D	2023–2026	53	0	9	9	25	—	—	—	—	—
Andre St. Laurent	(Canada)	C	1981–1984	96	23	14	37	130	5	2	1	3	8
Jordan Staal	(Canada)	C	2006–2012	431	120	128	248	231	73	23	13	36	34
Ron Stackhouse	(Canada)	D	1973–1982	621	66	277	343	547	32	5	8	13	38
Paul Stanton	(United States)	D	1990–1993	206	11	38	49	199	44	2	10	12	66
Mike Stapleton	(Canada)	C	1992–1994	136	11	13	24	28	4	0	0	0	0
Lee Stempniak	(United States)	R	2013–2014	21	4	7	11	4	13	2	1	3	6
Brett Sterling	(United States)	L	2010–2011	7	3	2	5	16	—	—	—	—	—
Kevin Stevens	(United States)	L	1987–2002	522	260	295	555	1048	103	46	60	106	170
John Stewart	(Canada)	L	1970–1972	40	4	9	13	32	—	—	—	—	—
Karl Stewart	(Canada)	L	2006–2007	3	0	0	0	2	—	—	—	—	—
Robert Stewart	(Canada)	D	1979–1980	65	3	7	10	52	5	1	1	2	2
Alek Stojanov	(Canada)	R	1995–1997	45	2	4	6	86	9	0	0	0	19
Ryan Stone	(Canada)	C	2007–2009	8	0	1	1	7	—	—	—	—	—
Blaine Stoughton	(Canada)	L	1973–1974	34	5	6	11	8	—	—	—	—	—
Brian Strait	(United States)	D	2010–2012	12	0	1	1	4	3	0	0	0	0
Martin Straka	(Czech Republic)	C	1992–2004	560	165	277	442	215	65	19	27	46	30
Art Stratton	(Canada)	C	1967–1968	58	16	21	37	16	—	—	—	—	—
Martin Strbak	(Slovakia)	D	2003–2004	44	3	11	14	38	—	—	—	—	—
Mark Streit	(Switzerland)	D	2016–2017	19	1	5	6	6	3	0	2	2	0
Bob Stumpf	(Canada)	R	1974–1975	3	0	0	0	4	—	—	—	—	—
Steve Sullivan	(Canada)	L	2011–2012	79	17	31	48	20	6	2	4	6	4
Oskar Sundqvist	(Sweden)	C	2015–2017	28	1	3	4	6	2	0	0	0	0
Tomas Surovy	(Slovakia)	L	2002–2006	126	27	32	59	71	—	—	—	—	—
Brandon Sutter	(Canada)	C	2012–2015	209	45	33	78	30	33	8	4	12	4
Richard Sutter	(Canada)	R	1982–1984	9	0	0	0	0	—	—	—	—	—
Garry Swain	(Canada)	C	1968–1969	9	1	1	2	0	—	—	—	—	—
George Swarbrick	(Canada)	R	1968–1970	31	1	7	8	36	—	—	—	—	—
Darryl Sydor	(Canada)	D	2007–2009	82	2	13	15	28	4	0	0	0	2
Petr Sykora	(Czech Republic)	R	2007–2009	157	53	56	109	77	27	6	4	10	16
Jeff Taffe	(United States)	L	2007–2009	53	5	9	14	10	—	—	—	—	—
Peter Taglianetti	(United States)	D	1990–1995	167	7	28	35	338	39	1	7	8	83
Maxime Talbot	(Canada)	C	2005–2011	388	52	56	108	324	66	14	19	33	87
Dale Tallon	(Canada)	D	1978–1980	95	10	33	43	53	4	0	0	0	4
Chris Tamer	(United States)	D	1993–1999	253	8	21	29	588	37	0	8	8	52
Brandon Tanev	(Canada)	L	2019–2021	100	18	23	41	38	10	1	1	2	0
Eric Tangradi	(United States)	L	2009–2013	45	1	4	5	26	3	0	1	1	0
Tony Tanti	(Canada)	R	1989–1991	83	20	30	50	66	—	—	—	—	—
Dick Tarnstrom	(Sweden)	D	2002–2006	174	28	75	103	140	—	—	—	—	—
Mark Taylor	(Canada)	C	1983–1985	106	31	41	72	43	—	—	—	—	—
Gregory Tebbutt	(Canada)	D	1983–1984	24	0	2	2	31	—	—	—	—	—
Bill Thomas	(United States)	R	2008–2009	16	2	1	3	2	—	—	—	—	—
Loran Thompson	(Canada)	L	1980–1981	34	6	8	14	12	—	—	—	—	—
Chris Thorburn	(Canada)	R	2006–2007	39	3	2	5	69	—	—	—	—	—
Thomas Thornbury	(Canada)	R	1983–1984	14	1	8	9	16	—	—	—	—	—
Billy Tibbetts	(United States)	R	2000–2002	62	2	7	9	188	—	—	—	—	—
Conor Timmins	(Canada)	D	2024–2025	17	1	6	7	6	—	—	—	—	—
Dave Tippett	(Canada)	L	1992–1993	74	6	19	25	56	12	1	4	5	14
German Titov	(Russia)	C	1998–2000	135	28	70	98	68	11	3	5	8	4
Rick Tocchet	(Canada)	R	1991–1994	150	76	103	179	435	32	15	22	37	68
Philip Tomasino	(Canada)	C	2024–2026	59	11	13	24	8	—	—	—	—	—
Jeff Toms	(Canada)	L	2001–2002	14	2	1	3	4	—	—	—	—	—
Tim Tookey	(Canada)	C	1983–1984	8	0	2	2	2	—	—	—	—	—
Daniel Trebil	(United States)	D	1999–2001	19	1	0	1	7	—	—	—	—	—
Zach Trotman	(United States)	D	2017–2020	24	0	1	1	8	—	—	—	—	—
Bryan Trottier	(Canada)	C	1990–1994	156	24	48	72	114	46	7	7	14	57
Ian Turnbull	(Canada)	D	1982–1983	6	0	0	0	4	—	—	—	—	—
Gene Ubriaco	(Canada)	L	1967–1969	114	33	26	59	30	—	—	—	—	—
Dominik Uher	(Czech Republic)	C	2014–2015	2	0	0	0	0	—	—	—	—	—
Garry Valk	(Canada)	L	1996–1998	56	5	5	10	58	—	—	—	—	—
Wayne Van Dorp	(Canada)	L	1987–1988	25	1	3	4	75	—	—	—	—	—
Ed Van Impe	(Canada)	D	1975–1977	22	0	8	8	22	3	0	1	1	2
Ryan Vandenbussche	(Canada)	R	2005–2006	20	1	0	1	42	—	—	—	—	—
Joe Vitale	(United States)	C	2010–2014	163	8	27	35	115	23	0	1	1	22
Vladimir Vujtek	(Czech Republic)	L	2002–2003	5	0	1	1	0	—	—	—	—	—
Tim Wallace	(United States)	R	2008–2011	24	0	2	2	12	—	—	—	—	—
David Warsofsky	(United States)	L	2015–2017	19	1	1	2	6	—	—	—	—	—
Bryan Watson	(Canada)	D	1968–1974	304	8	57	65	871	14	0	0	0	38
Steve Webb	(Canada)	R	2003–2004	5	0	0	0	2	—	—	—	—	—
Yannick Weber	(Switzerland)	D	2020–2021	2	0	0	0	0	—	—	—	—	—
Edward Weir	(Canada)	R	1984–1985	14	0	3	3	34	—	—	—	—	—
Noah Welch	(United States)	D	2005–2007	27	2	4	6	24	—	—	—	—	—
Chris Wells	(Canada)	C	1995–1996	54	2	2	4	59	—	—	—	—	—
Brad Werenka	(Canada)	D	1997–2000	213	12	41	53	208	19	2	1	3	14
Colin White	(United States)	C	2023–2024	11	0	0	0	2	—	—	—	—	—
Ryan Whitney	(United States)	D	2005–2009	253	34	116	150	223	25	2	6	8	31
Thomas Wiley	(Canada)	C	1972–1974	26	0	4	4	2	—	—	—	—	—
Barry Wilkins	(Canada)	D	1974–1976	134	5	56	61	203	6	0	1	1	4
Neil Wilkinson	(Canada)	D	1995–1999	122	4	14	18	169	20	0	1	1	18
Jason Williams	(Canada)	C	2011–2012	8	1	1	2	4	—	—	—	—	—
Garrett Wilson	(Canada)	L	2018–2019	50	2	6	8	18	4	1	0	1	0
Landon Wilson	(United States)	R	2003–2004	19	5	1	6	31	—	—	—	—	—
Mike Wilson	(Canada)	D	2001–2002	21	1	1	2	17	—	—	—	—	—
Mitch Wilson	(Canada)	R	1986–1987	17	2	1	3	83	—	—	—	—	—
Scott Wilson	(Canada)	C	2014–2017	103	13	19	32	44	23	3	3	6	11
Daniel Winnik	(Canada)	L	2014–2015	21	2	7	9	8	5	0	0	0	2
Bennett Wolf	(Canada)	D	1980–1983	30	0	1	1	133	—	—	—	—	—
Jason Woolley	(Canada)	D	1996–1997	57	6	30	36	28	5	0	3	3	0
Parker Wotherspoon	(Canada)	D	2025–2026	80	3	27	30	55	6	0	1	1	12
Bob Woytowich	(Canada)	D	1968–1972	248	22	71	93	149	10	1	2	3	2
Tyler Wright	(Canada)	C	1996–2000	238	17	16	33	317	30	3	2	5	40
Harry York	(Canada)	C	1998–1999	2	0	0	0	0	—	—	—	—	—
Scott Young	(United States)	R	1990–1991	43	11	16	27	33	17	1	6	7	2
Warren Young	(Canada)	C	1983–1988	152	49	52	101	311	—	—	—	—	—
Rod Zaine	(Canada)	C	1970–1971	37	8	5	13	21	—	—	—	—	—
Zarley Zalapski	(Canada)	D	1987–1991	190	33	102	135	160	11	1	8	9	13
Richard Zemlak	(Canada)	C	1988–1990	50	1	5	6	178	1	0	0	0	10
Michael Zigomanis	(Canada)	C	2008–2009	22	2	4	6	27	—	—	—	—	—
Radim Zohorna	(Czech Republic)	F	2020–2022; 2023–2024	58	8	9	17	26	—	—	—	—	—
Harry Zolnierczyk	(Canada)	L	2013–2014	13	2	0	2	12	—	—	—	—	—
Sergei Zubov	(Russia)	D	1995–1996	64	11	55	66	22	18	1	14	15	26
Jason Zucker	(United States)	L	2019–2023	172	50	45	95	85	15	4	3	7	4
