= Peter Sturgeon =

Canadian ice hockey player

- Born: February 12, 1954 (age 72) Whitehorse, Yukon, Canada
- Height: 6 ft 2 in (188 cm)
- Weight: 198 lb (90 kg; 14 st 2 lb)
- Position: Left wing
- Shot: Left
- Played for: Colorado Rockies
- NHL draft: 36th overall, 1974; Boston Bruins
- WHA draft: 14th overall, 1974; New England Whalers
- Playing career: 1974–1981

Peter Sturgeon (born February 12, 1954) is a Canadian retired professional ice hockey player. He was drafted by the Boston Bruins with the 36th overall pick in the 1974 NHL entry draft. He went on to play in six games in the National Hockey League, all with the Colorado Rockies.

He is the father of musician Adam Sturgeon of Status/Non-Status and OMBIIGIZI.

== Career statistics ==
=== Regular season and playoffs ===
			Regular season					Playoffs
Season	Team	League	GP	G	A	Pts	PIM	GP	G	A	Pts	PIM
1971–72	Chatham Maroons	SOJHL	—	—	—	—	—	—	—	—	—	—
1971–72	Kitchener Rangers	OHA	26	1	5	6	8	2	1	0	1	0
1972–73	Chatham Maroons	SOJHL	48	41	33	74	44	—	—	—	—	—
1972–73	Kitchener Rangers	OHA	5	1	1	2	0	—	—	—	—	—
1973–74	Kitchener Rangers	OHA	70	39	48	87	42	—	—	—	—	—
1974–75	Rochester Americans	AHL	32	6	11	17	19	—	—	—	—	—
1975–76	Rochester Americans	AHL	1	0	0	0	0	—	—	—	—	—
1975–76	Baltimore Clippers	AHL	4	0	1	1	7	—	—	—	—	—
1975–76	Broome Dusters	NAHL	67	18	15	33	62	—	—	—	—	—
1976–77	Columbus Owls	IHL	48	16	13	29	55	7	1	1	2	24
1977–78	Rochester Americans	AHL	12	0	1	1	21	—	—	—	—	—
1977–78	Grand Rapids Owls	IHL	6	2	1	3	24	—	—	—	—	—
1977–78	Phoenix Roadrunners	PHL	42	12	14	26	13	—	—	—	—	—
1978–79	Grand Rapids Owls	IHL	6	2	1	3	34	—	—	—	—	—
1979–80	Colorado Rockies	NHL	2	0	0	0	0	—	—	—	—	—
1979–80	Fort Worth Texans	CHL	22	8	12	20	10	15	2	6	8	6
1980–81	Colorado Rockies	NHL	4	0	1	1	2	—	—	—	—	—
1980–81	Fort Worth Texans	CHL	52	5	14	19	21	—	—	—	—	—
1981–82	Georgetown Raiders	OHA Sr	34	36	55	91	—	—	—	—	—	—
NHL totals			6	0	1	1	2	—	—	—	—	—
