= Gordon Laxton =

Canadian ice hockey player (born 1955)

- Born: March 16, 1955 (age 71) Montreal, Quebec, Canada
- Height: 5 ft 11 in (180 cm)
- Weight: 185 lb (84 kg; 13 st 3 lb)
- Position: Goaltender
- Caught: Left
- Played for: Pittsburgh Penguins
- NHL draft: 13th overall, 1975; Pittsburgh Penguins
- WHA draft: 33rd overall, 1975; Michigan Stags
- Playing career: 1975–1983

Gordon "Gord, Gordie" Laxton (born March 16, 1955) is a Canadian former professional ice hockey goaltender. He played 17 games in the National Hockey League (NHL) with the Pittsburgh Penguins from 1975 to 1979. The rest of his career, which lasted from 1975 to 1983, was spent in the minor leagues.

== Playing career ==
Gordon Laxton played two seasons for the New Westminster Bruins of the WCHL before being selected in the 1975 NHL Draft by the Penguins. Laxton was also drafted by the Michigan Stags in the 1975 WHA draft.

Laxton chose the NHL over the WHA and signed a contract with the Penguins. Laxton played 17 games for the Penguins during his 4 seasons in the NHL.

After his years in the NHL, Laxton played for several AHL and IHL teams, including the Muskegon Mohawks, Grand Rapids Owls, and Erie Blades. Laxton retired in 1983.

== Career statistics ==
=== Regular season and playoffs ===
| | | | Regular season | | | | | | | | | Playoffs |
| Season | Team | League | GP | W | L | T | MIN | GA | SO | GAA | SV% | GP | W | L | MIN | GA | SO | GAA | SV% |
|---|---|---|---|---|---|---|---|---|---|---|---|---|---|---|---|---|---|---|---|
| 1972–73 | Chilliwack Bruins | BCJHL | — | — | — | — | — | — | — | — | — | — | — | — | — | — | — | — | — |
| 1973–74 | New Westminster Bruins | WCHL | 25 | 13 | 5 | 3 | 1350 | 75 | 0 | 3.33 | .886 | 4 | 0 | 3 | 126 | 14 | 0 | 6.67 | — |
| 1974–75 | New Westminster Bruins | WCHL | 70 | 35 | 21 | 11 | 3980 | 239 | 3 | 3.60 | .887 | 18 | — | — | 1081 | 67 | 0 | 3.71 | — |
| 1974–75 | New Westminster Bruins | M-Cup | — | — | — | — | — | — | — | — | — | 3 | 2 | 1 | 180 | 14 | 0 | 4.67 | — |
| 1975–76 | Pittsburgh Penguins | NHL | 8 | 3 | 4 | 0 | 413 | 31 | 0 | 4.51 | .847 | — | — | — | — | — | — | — | — |
| 1975–76 | Hershey Bears | AHL | 31 | 16 | 11 | 4 | 1857 | 104 | 0 | 3.36 | — | 6 | 4 | 2 | 309 | 19 | 0 | 3.69 | — |
| 1976–77 | Pittsburgh Penguins | NHL | 6 | 1 | 3 | 1 | 254 | 26 | 0 | 6.17 | .835 | — | — | — | — | — | — | — | — |
| 1976–77 | Hershey Bears | AHL | 18 | 4 | 11 | 0 | 958 | 80 | 0 | 5.01 | — | — | — | — | — | — | — | — | — |
| 1977–78 | Pittsburgh Penguins | NHL | 2 | 0 | 1 | 0 | 74 | 9 | 0 | 7.35 | .813 | — | — | — | — | — | — | — | — |
| 1977–78 | Grand Rapids Owls | IHL | 45 | — | — | — | 2651 | 183 | 0 | 4.14 | — | — | — | — | — | — | — | — | — |
| 1978–79 | Pittsburgh Penguins | NHL | 1 | 0 | 1 | 0 | 60 | 8 | 0 | 8.00 | .704 | — | — | — | — | — | — | — | — |
| 1978–79 | Grand Rapids Owls | IHL | 63 | — | — | — | 3742 | 192 | 3 | 3.08 | — | 19 | 10 | 9 | 1178 | 81 | 1 | 4.13 | — |
| 1979–80 | Syracuse Firebirds | AHL | 2 | 0 | 1 | 0 | 69 | 11 | 0 | 9.56 | .756 | — | — | — | — | — | — | — | — |
| 1979–80 | Grand Rapids Owls | IHL | 20 | — | — | — | 1197 | 90 | 0 | 4.51 | — | — | — | — | — | — | — | — | — |
| 1980–81 | Binghamton Whalers | AHL | 2 | 0 | 2 | 0 | 118 | 12 | 0 | 6.10 | .803 | — | — | — | — | — | — | — | — |
| 1980–81 | Port Huron Flags | IHL | 52 | — | — | — | 2923 | 207 | 0 | 4.25 | — | 3 | 0 | 3 | 191 | 12 | 0 | 3.77 | — |
| 1981–82 | Erie Blades | AHL | 31 | 2 | 23 | 1 | 1672 | 172 | 0 | 6.17 | — | — | — | — | — | — | — | — | — |
| 1981–82 | Muskegon Mohawks | IHL | 3 | — | — | — | 175 | 11 | 0 | 3.71 | — | — | — | — | — | — | — | — | — |
| 1982–83 | Muskegon Mohawks | IHL | 40 | — | — | — | 2326 | 158 | 1 | 4.08 | — | 2 | 1 | 1 | 120 | 8 | 0 | 4.00 | — |
| NHL totals | | | 17 | 4 | 9 | 1 | 800 | 74 | 0 | 5.56 | .830 | — | — | — | — | — | — | — | — |

| Preceded by Pierre Larouche | Pittsburgh Penguins first-round draft pick 1975 | Succeeded by Blair Chapman |
