= Greg Neeld =

Canadian ice hockey player

- Born: February 25, 1955 (age 71) Vancouver, British Columbia, Canada
- Height: 6 ft 0 in (183 cm)
- Weight: 198 lb (90 kg; 14 st 2 lb)
- Position: Defence
- Shot: Right
- Played for: Toronto Toros
- NHL draft: 71st overall, 1975; Buffalo Sabres
- WHA draft: 40th overall, 1975; Minnesota Fighting Saints
- Playing career: 1975–1979

Greg Neeld (born February 25, 1955) is a Canadian former professional ice hockey defenceman. He played 17 games for the Toronto Toros of the World Hockey Association.

On December 7, 1973, in an Ontario Hockey Association junior game between Neeld's Toronto Marlboros and the Kitchener Rangers, Neeld was high-sticked in the face by Kitchener's Dave Maloney, resulting in the loss of his left eye. Neeld became the first player (excluding goaltenders) to wear a facial shield in regular play. Neeld's injury brought attention to the issue of ocular safety in ice hockey, and in Canada, facial protection was made mandatory for minor hockey by 1980. Today, many leagues across North America and Europe mandate the use of visors for their players.

He persevered with his dream to become a professional hockey player. He was drafted 71st overall in the fourth round of the 1975 NHL Amateur Draft by the Buffalo Sabres and 40th overall in the third round of the 1975 WHA Amateur Draft by the Minnesota Fighting Saints. He never played an NHL game, as the Sabres were not able to get around the rule that a player was required to be sighted in both eyes. However, Neeld appeared in 17 games with the Toronto Toros in the 1975-76 WHA season, registering only one assist. He spent part of the season in the NAHL, and the entirety of the next season. He played two more seasons in the International Hockey League (IHL) for four various teams until 1979.

Neeld is currently the CEO of a Vancouver-based mining exploration company.

== Career statistics ==
=== Regular season and playoffs ===
			Regular season					Playoffs
Season	Team	League	GP	G	A	Pts	PIM	GP	G	A	Pts	PIM
1971–72	Toronto Marlboros	OHA	3	0	0	0	0	––	––	––	––	––
1972–73	Toronto Marlboros	OHA	28	5	19	24	71	––	––	––	––	––
1972–73	Sudbury Wolves	OHA	26	4	18	22	70	––	––	––	––	––
1973–74	Toronto Marlboros	OHA	31	4	11	15	98	––	––	––	––	––
1974–75	Calgary Centennials	WCHL	62	29	30	59	186	––	––	––	––	––
1975–76	Buffalo Norsemen	NAHL	26	7	6	13	85	2	1	0	1	10
1975–76	Toronto Toros	WHA	17	0	1	1	18	––	––	––	––	––
1976–77	Erie Blades	NAHL	73	21	43	64	128	8	1	3	4	35
1977–78	Dayton/Grand Rapids Owls	IHL	17	4	10	14	38	––	––	––	––	––
1978–79	Kalamazoo Wings	IHL	7	1	5	6	44	––	––	––	––	––
1978–79	Toledo Goaldiggers	IHL	21	2	5	7	54	––	––	––	––	––
1978–79	Muskegon Mohawks	IHL	42	7	28	35	186	––	––	––	––	––
NAHL totals			99	28	49	77	213	10	2	3	5	45
IHL totals			87	14	48	62	322	—	—	—	—	—
WHA totals			17	0	1	1	18	—	—	—	—	—
