= Mike Brown (ice hockey, born 1957) =

American ice hockey player (born 1957)

- Born: December 23, 1957 (age 68) Detroit, Michigan, U.S.
- Height: 6 ft 5 in (196 cm)
- Weight: 215 lb (98 kg; 15 st 5 lb)
- Position: Defense
- Played for: EHL; Richmond Rifles; Baltimore Clippers; IHL; Kalamazoo Wings; Flint Generals; Saginaw Generals
- NHL draft: 164th overall, 1977; New York Rangers
- Playing career: 1979–1986

Mike Brown (born December 23, 1957) is an American former professional ice hockey player. He was selected by the New York Rangers in the 11th round (164th overall) of the 1977 NHL amateur draft.

== Career statistics ==
			Regular season					Playoffs
Season	Team	League	GP	G	A	Pts	PIM	GP	G	A	Pts	PIM
1975–76	Western Michigan University	NCAA	9	2	9	11	17	—	—	—	—	—
1976–77	Western Michigan University	NCAA	34	6	5	11	—	—	—	—	—	—
1977–78	Western Michigan University	NCAA	33	13	16	29	98	—	—	—	—	—
1978–79	Western Michigan University	NCAA	32	12	19	31	46	—	—	—	—	—
1979–80	Richmond Rifles	EHL-Pro	70	14	29	43	243	5	1	1	2	0
1980–81	Richmond Rifles	EHL-Pro	21	3	11	14	47	—	—	—	—	—
1980–81	Baltimore Clippers	EHL-Pro	47	7	10	17	186	4	1	0	1	2
1981–82	Kalamazoo Wings	IHL	81	8	42	50	351	5	0	2	2	28
1982–83	Kalamazoo Wings	IHL	82	16	27	43	254	8	0	1	1	17
1983–84	Kalamazoo Wings	IHL	12	0	1	1	21	—	—	—	—	—
1983–84	Flint Generals	IHL	63	9	29	38	176	8	1	6	7	16
1984–85	Flint Generals	IHL	82	1	29	30	212	7	0	0	0	14
1985–86	Saginaw Generals	IHL	11	0	3	3	7	—	—	—	—	—
IHL totals			331	34	131	165	1,021	28	1	9	10	75
