= List of Pittsburgh Penguins minor league affiliates =

The Pittsburgh Penguins are a team in the National Hockey League.

== 1999–present ==
Current team locations:
AHL Affiliate
ECHL Affiliate

The current structure of the Penguins' farm system has been in place since 1999. The Penguins did not own a minor league team until 1999 when the Wilkes-Barre/Scranton Penguins of the American Hockey League were developed.

Year	AHL	ECHL
2018-19	Wilkes-Barre/Scranton Penguins	Wheeling Nailers
2017-18	Wilkes-Barre/Scranton Penguins	Wheeling Nailers
2016-17	Wilkes-Barre/Scranton Penguins	Wheeling Nailers
2015-16	Wilkes-Barre/Scranton Penguins	Wheeling Nailers
2014-15	Wilkes-Barre/Scranton Penguins	Wheeling Nailers
2013-14	Wilkes-Barre/Scranton Penguins	Wheeling Nailers
2012-13	Wilkes-Barre/Scranton Penguins	Wheeling Nailers
2011-12	Wilkes-Barre/Scranton Penguins	Wheeling Nailers
2010-11	Wilkes-Barre/Scranton Penguins	Wheeling Nailers
2009-10	Wilkes-Barre/Scranton Penguins	Wheeling Nailers
2008-09	Wilkes-Barre/Scranton Penguins	Wheeling Nailers
2007-08	Wilkes-Barre/Scranton Penguins	Wheeling Nailers
2006-07	Wilkes-Barre/Scranton Penguins	Wheeling Nailers
2005-06	Wilkes-Barre/Scranton Penguins	Wheeling Nailers
2004-05	Wilkes-Barre/Scranton Penguins	Wheeling Nailers
2003-04	Wilkes-Barre/Scranton Penguins	Wheeling Nailers
2002-03	Wilkes-Barre/Scranton Penguins	Wheeling Nailers
2001-02	Wilkes-Barre/Scranton Penguins	Wheeling Nailers
2000-01	Wilkes-Barre/Scranton Penguins	Wheeling Nailers
1999-00	Wilkes-Barre/Scranton Penguins	Wheeling Nailers

== 1973–1999 ==
Between 1973 and 1999, the Penguins organization contained minor league affiliates inside of the American Hockey League, International Hockey League, ECHL and United Hockey League.

Year	AHL	IHL	ECHL	UHL
1998-99	Syracuse Crunch		Wheeling Nailers	
1997-98	Syracuse Crunch		Johnstown Chiefs	
1996-97		Cleveland Lumberjacks	Johnstown Chiefs	
1995-96		Cleveland Lumberjacks	Hampton Roads Admirals	
1994-95		Cleveland Lumberjacks		
1993-94		Cleveland Lumberjacks	Louisville Icehawks	Muskegon Fury
1992-93		Cleveland Lumberjacks		Muskegon Fury
1991-92		Muskegon Lumberjacks	Knoxville Cherokees	
1990-91		Muskegon Lumberjacks	Knoxville Cherokees	
1989-90		Muskegon Lumberjacks		
1988-89		Muskegon Lumberjacks		
1987-88		Muskegon Lumberjacks		
1986-87	Baltimore Skipjacks	Muskegon Lumberjacks		
1985-86	Baltimore Skipjacks	Muskegon Lumberjacks		
1984-85	Baltimore Skipjacks	Muskegon Lumberjacks		
1983-84	Baltimore Skipjacks	Muskegon Mohawks		
1982-83	Baltimore Skipjacks	Muskegon Mohawks		
1981-82	Erie Blades	Muskegon Mohawks		
1980-81	Binghamton Whalers			
1979-80	Syracuse Firebirds			
1978-79	Binghamton Dusters	Grand Rapids/Dayton Owls		
1977-78	Binghamton Dusters	Dayton/Grand Rapids Owls		
1976-77	Hershey Bears			
1975-76	Hershey Bears	Columbus Owls		

== 1967–1973 ==
Initially, the Penguins organization contained minor league affiliates inside of the AHL, IHL, Central Hockey League and the low-level minor professional North American Hockey League.

Year	AHL	IHL	CHL	NAHL
1974-75	Hershey Bears	Ft. Wayne Komets		Johnstown Jets
1973-74	Hershey Bears	Ft. Wayne Komets		
1972-73	Hershey Bears	Ft. Wayne Komets		
1971-72	Hershey Bears	Ft. Wayne Komets		
1970-71	Baltimore Clippers		Amarillo Wranglers	
1969-70	Baltimore Clippers			
1968-69			Amarillo Wranglers	
1967-68			Baltimore Clippers	
