= Steve Lyon =

Canadian ice hockey player (born 1952)

- Born: May 16, 1952 (age 74) Toronto, Ontario, Canada
- Height: 5 ft 10 in (178 cm)
- Weight: 169 lb (77 kg; 12 st 1 lb)
- Position: Defenceman
- Shot: Right
- Played for: Pittsburgh Penguins
- NHL draft: 145th overall, 1972; Minnesota North Stars
- Playing career: 1971–1978

Steve Lyon (born November 3, 1952) is a Canadian former professional ice hockey player who played 3 games in the National Hockey League with the Pittsburgh Penguins during the 1976–77 season.

== Career ==
Lyon signed with the Pittsburgh Penguins as a free agent in November 1976. He played a total of 3 games at the NHL level.

== Career statistics ==
=== Regular season and playoffs ===
			Regular season					Playoffs
Season	Team	League	GP	G	A	Pts	PIM	GP	G	A	Pts	PIM
1970–71	Richmond Hill Rams	MetJBHL	—	—	—	—	—	—	—	—	—	—
1971–72	Peterborough Petes	OHA	36	7	21	28	118	—	—	—	—	—
1971–72	Peterborough Petes	M-Cup	—	—	—	—	—	3	0	1	1	10
1972–73	Saginaw Gears	IHL	65	3	30	33	105	—	—	—	—	—
1973–74	Columbus Owls	IHL	76	10	60	70	169	6	4	2	6	4
1974–75	Columbus Owls	IHL	76	15	51	66	130	5	0	1	1	22
1974–75	Rochester Americans	AHL	—	—	—	—	—	3	0	0	0	5
1975–76	Columbus Owls	IHL	76	25	43	68	165	—	—	—	—	—
1976–77	Pittsburgh Penguins	NHL	3	0	0	0	2	—	—	—	—	—
1976–77	Columbus Owls	IHL	77	33	58	91	123	7	1	1	2	17
1977–78	Grand Rapids Owls	IHL	3	0	3	3	2	—	—	—	—	—
1977–78	Whitby Warriors	OHA Sr	28	2	21	23	20	—	—	—	—	—
1978–79	Whitby Warriors	OHA Sr	40	13	52	65	—	—	—	—	—	—
1980–81	Georgetown Gyros	OHA Sr	36	9	50	59	—	—	—	—	—	—
1981–82	Georgetown Raiders	OHA Sr	36	11	60	71	—	—	—	—	—	—
1982–83	Georgetown Aces	OHA Sr	—	—	—	—	—	—	—	—	—	—
IHL totals			373	86	245	331	694	18	5	4	9	43
NHL totals			3	0	0	0	2	—	—	—	—	—

== Awards ==
- IHL First All-Star Team (1974, 1975)
