= Jim Hamilton (ice hockey) =

Canadian ice hockey player

- Born: January 18, 1957 (age 69) Barrie, Ontario, Canada
- Height: 6 ft 0 in (183 cm)
- Weight: 181 lb (82 kg; 12 st 13 lb)
- Position: Left wing
- Shot: Left
- Played for: Pittsburgh Penguins
- NHL draft: 30th overall, 1977; Pittsburgh Penguins
- WHA draft: 64th overall, 1977; Winnipeg Jets
- Playing career: 1977–1985

James Neil Hamilton (born January 18, 1957) is a Canadian former professional ice hockey winger who played 95 games in the National Hockey League with the Winnipeg Jets and Pittsburgh Penguins. As a youth, he played in the 1969 and 1970 Quebec International Pee-Wee Hockey Tournaments with a minor ice hockey team from Barrie.

== Career statistics ==
			Regular Season					Playoffs
Season	Team	League	GP	G	A	Pts	PIM	GP	G	A	Pts	PIM
1973–74	London Knights	OHA	70	9	14	23	19	—	—	—	—	—
1974–75	London Knights	OHA	68	17	24	41	108	—	—	—	—	—
1975–76	London Knights	OHA	53	24	23	47	37	—	—	—	—	—
1976–77	London Knights	OHA	65	39	53	92	40	—	—	—	—	—
1977–78	Pittsburgh Penguins	NHL	25	2	4	6	2	—	—	—	—	—
1977–78	Binghamton Dusters	AHL	31	4	4	8	19	—	—	—	—	—
1977–78	Dayton/Grand Rapids Owls	IHL	22	7	15	22	12	—	—	—	—	—
1978–79	Pittsburgh Penguins	NHL	2	0	0	0	0	5	3	0	3	0
1978–79	Binghamton Dusters	AHL	66	25	24	49	34	6	2	3	5	2
1979–80	Pittsburgh Penguins	NHL	10	2	0	2	0	—	—	—	—	—
1979–80	Syracuse Firebirds	AHL	50	16	19	35	33	4	0	1	1	4
1980–81	Binghamton Whalers	AHL	28	16	18	34	31	5	3	6	9	2
1980–81	Pittsburgh Penguins	NHL	20	1	6	7	18	1	0	0	0	0
1981–82	Pittsburgh Penguins	NHL	11	5	3	8	2	—	—	—	—	—
1981–82	Erie Blades	AHL	57	27	17	44	51	—	—	—	—	—
1982–83	Baltimore Skipjacks	AHL	45	32	10	42	36	—	—	—	—	—
1982–83	Pittsburgh Penguins	NHL	5	0	2	2	2	—	—	—	—	—
1983–84	Baltimore Skipjacks	AHL	66	34	45	79	54	9	6	6	12	0
1983–84	Pittsburgh Penguins	NHL	11	2	2	4	4	—	—	—	—	—
1984–85	Baltimore Skipjacks	AHL	16	5	6	11	24	—	—	—	—	—
1984–85	Pittsburgh Penguins	NHL	11	2	1	3	0	—	—	—	—	—
1984–85	Muskegon Lumberjacks	IHL	1	0	0	0	0	—	—	—	—	—
NHL totals			95	14	18	32	28	6	3	0	3	0
