= Bruce Hamilton (ice hockey) =

Canadian ice hockey player

- Born: June 30, 1957 (age 68) Saskatoon, Saskatchewan, Canada
- Height: 6 ft 1 in (185 cm)
- Weight: 183 lb (83 kg; 13 st 1 lb)
- Position: Left wing
- Shot: Left
- Played for: Port Huron Flags; Milwaukee Admirals; Flint Generals; Spokane Flyers; Baltimore Clippers
- NHL draft: 81st overall, 1977; St. Louis Blues
- Playing career: 1977–1981

Bruce Hamilton (born June 30, 1957) is a Canadian ice hockey executive and former player. He is the current owner, president and general manager of the Kelowna Rockets of the Western Hockey League (WHL).

== Career ==
Hamilton was selected by the St. Louis Blues in the fifth round (81st overall) of the 1977 NHL Amateur Draft.

Hamilton played four seasons of professional ice hockey, including 81 games in the International Hockey League (IHL) with the Port Huron Flags, Milwaukee Admirals, and Flint Generals.

Following his playing career, Hamilton worked as a scout, first in the Western Hockey League (WHL) with the Saskatoon Blades (1981–1984), and then in the National Hockey League (NHL) with the Hartford Whalers (1987–1989) and Washington Capitals (1989–1991). In 1991, he entered the WHL as the owner of the Tacoma Rockets franchise, which moved to Kelowna in 1995.

== Personal life ==
Hamilton's son, Curtis, played with the Edmonton Oilers during the 2014–15 NHL season.

== Career statistics ==
			Regular season					Playoffs
Season	Team	League	GP	G	A	Pts	PIM	GP	G	A	Pts	PIM
1974–75	Saskatoon Blades	WCHL	40	20	10	30	25	17	2	0	2	21
1975–76	Saskatoon Blades	WCHL	68	34	50	84	64	13	7	1	8	28
1976–77	Saskatoon Blades	WCHL	70	37	36	73	85	6	0	1	1	17
1977–78	Port Huron Flags	IHL	37	12	8	20	48	—	—	—	—	—
1977–78	Milwaukee Admirals	IHL	9	0	1	1	7	—	—	—	—	—
1977–78	Flint Generals	IHL	3	0	0	0	7	—	—	—	—	—
1978–79	Port Huron Flags	IHL	32	11	16	27	16	6	0	0	0	2
1979–80	Spokane Flyers	WIHL	—	43	30	73	—	—	—	—	—	—
1980–81	Baltimore Skipjacks	EHL-Pro	24	7	11	18	77	—	—	—	—	—
IHL totals			81	23	25	48	78	6	0	0	0	2
