= Lex Hudson =

Canadian ice hockey player (born 1955)

- Born: December 31, 1955 (age 70) Winnipeg, Manitoba, Canada
- Died: 12/13/23 Nashville, TN
- Height: 6 ft 3 in (191 cm)
- Weight: 185 lb (84 kg; 13 st 3 lb)
- Position: Defence
- Shot: Left
- Played for: NHL; Pittsburgh Penguins
- NHL draft: 196th overall, 1975; Pittsburgh Penguins
- Playing career: 1978–1980

Alexander Hudson (born December 31, 1955) is a Canadian retired professional ice hockey player who played two regular season and two playoff games in the National Hockey League for the Pittsburgh Penguins during the 1978–79 season. Hudson was born in Winnipeg, Manitoba. Prior to his professional career, Hudson was standout player at the University of Denver.

== Career statistics ==
=== Regular season and playoffs ===
			Regular season					Playoffs
Season	Team	League	GP	G	A	Pts	PIM	GP	G	A	Pts	PIM
1973–74	West Kildonan North Stars	MJHL	46	9	28	37	50	—	—	—	—	—
1974–75	University of Denver	WCHA	35	2	3	5	29	—	—	—	—	—
1975–76	University of Denver	WCHA	35	1	13	14	34	—	—	—	—	—
1976–77	University of Denver	WCHA	29	0	9	9	32	—	—	—	—	—
1977–78	University of Denver	WCHA	40	1	12	13	46	—	—	—	—	—
1978–79	Pittsburgh Penguins	NHL	2	0	0	0	0	2	0	0	0	0
1978–79	Binghamton Dusters	AHL	2	0	0	0	0	—	—	—	—	—
1978–79	Grand Rapids Owls	IHL	69	6	29	35	53	18	2	6	8	18
1979–80	Grand Rapids Owls	IHL	8	1	5	6	0	—	—	—	—	—
1979–80	Cincinnati Stingers	CHL	32	1	6	7	21	—	—	—	—	—
NHL totals			2	0	0	0	0	2	0	0	0	0

== Awards and honors ==
Award	Year
All-WCHA Second Team	1977–78
