= Columbus Golden Seals =

US minor league ice hockey team

- City: Columbus, Ohio
- League: International Hockey League
- Operated: 1971–1973
- Home arena: Fairgrounds Coliseum

Franchise history
- 1966–1970: Columbus Checkers
- 1971–1973: Columbus Golden Seals
- 1973–1977: Columbus Owls
- 1977: Dayton Owls
- 1977–1980: Grand Rapids Owls

The Columbus Golden Seals were a minor league professional ice hockey team in the International Hockey League from 1971 to 1973. Columbus operated as a farm team to the National Hockey League's California Golden Seals. The owner of the NHL Seals, Charlie Finley, had acquired the IHL franchise rights to the dormant Columbus Checkers to create the farm team. In 1973, Finley sold the Columbus Golden Seals. The new owner, Al Savill, renamed the team the Columbus Owls for the 1973–74 season.
