= Bennett Wolf =

Canadian ice hockey defenceman

- Born: October 23, 1959 (age 66) Kitchener, Ontario, Canada
- Height: 6 ft 3 in (191 cm)
- Weight: 205 lb (93 kg; 14 st 9 lb)
- Position: Defence
- Shot: Left
- Played for: Pittsburgh Penguins
- NHL draft: 52nd overall, 1979; Pittsburgh Penguins
- Playing career: 1979–1985

Bennett Martin Wolf (born October 23, 1959) is a Canadian former ice hockey player who played 30 games in the National Hockey League for the Pittsburgh Penguins from 1980 to 1983. Wolf was born in Kitchener, Ontario.

== Career statistics ==
=== Regular season and playoffs ===
| | | | Regular season | | | | | Playoffs |
| Season | Team | League | GP | G | A | Pts | PIM | GP | G | A | Pts | PIM |
|---|---|---|---|---|---|---|---|---|---|---|---|---|
| 1975–76 | Kitchener Greenshirts | OHA-B | — | — | — | — | — | — | — | — | — | — |
| 1976–77 | Kitchener Greenshirts | OHA-B | 38 | 3 | 16 | 19 | 200 | — | — | — | — | — |
| 1976–77 | Kitchener Rangers | OMJHL | 7 | 0 | 1 | 1 | 16 | 1 | 0 | 0 | 0 | 0 |
| 1977–78 | Toronto Marlboros | OMJHL | 66 | 3 | 13 | 16 | 334 | 5 | 0 | 1 | 1 | 37 |
| 1978–79 | Toronto Marlboros | OMJHL | 18 | 0 | 3 | 3 | 48 | — | — | — | — | — |
| 1978–79 | Kitchener Rangers | OMJHL | 47 | 3 | 18 | 21 | 279 | 10 | 0 | 4 | 4 | 73 |
| 1979–80 | Grand Rapids Owls | IHL | 51 | 3 | 14 | 17 | 408 | — | — | — | — | — |
| 1979–80 | Syracuse Firebirds | AHL | — | — | — | — | — | 4 | 0 | 0 | 0 | 39 |
| 1980–81 | Pittsburgh Penguins | NHL | 24 | 0 | 1 | 1 | 94 | — | — | — | — | — |
| 1980–81 | Binghamton Whalers | AHL | 14 | 2 | 2 | 4 | 106 | — | — | — | — | — |
| 1981–82 | Pittsburgh Penguins | NHL | 1 | 0 | 0 | 0 | 2 | — | — | — | — | — |
| 1981–82 | Erie Blades | AHL | 45 | 0 | 4 | 4 | 153 | — | — | — | — | — |
| 1982–83 | Pittsburgh Penguins | NHL | 5 | 0 | 0 | 0 | 37 | — | — | — | — | — |
| 1982–83 | Baltimore Skipjacks | AHL | 61 | 1 | 10 | 11 | 223 | — | — | — | — | — |
| 1983–84 | Baltimore Skipjacks | AHL | 63 | 3 | 13 | 16 | 349 | 10 | 0 | 2 | 2 | 24 |
| 1984–85 | Baltimore Skipjacks | AHL | 55 | 0 | 8 | 8 | 285 | 13 | 0 | 2 | 2 | 89 |
| AHL totals | | | 238 | 6 | 37 | 43 | 1116 | 27 | 0 | 4 | 4 | 152 |
| NHL totals | | | 30 | 0 | 1 | 1 | 133 | — | — | — | — | — |
