= Columbus Checkers =

- City: Columbus, Ohio
- League: International Hockey League
- Operated: 1966–1970
- Home arena: Fairgrounds Coliseum

Franchise history
- 1966–1970: Columbus Checkers
- 1971–1973: Columbus Golden Seals
- 1973–1977: Columbus Owls
- 1977: Dayton Owls
- 1977–1980: Grand Rapids Owls

The Columbus Checkers were a minor league professional ice hockey team in the International Hockey League from 1966 to 1970, and the first professional hockey team in Columbus, Ohio.

Their first game was against the Chicago Blackhawks of the National Hockey League on October 12, 1966 at the Ohio Expo Fairgrounds Coliseum.

The team was originally coached by Moe Bartoli, however after the 1967–68 season, Bartoli was involved in a dispute with the teams owners, and left. Jack Turner took over as the team's Head Coach at the start of the 1968 season.

Notably, Alton White, who would become the second player of African descent, after Willie O'Ree, to play on a professional major league ice-hockey team, played for the club over three seasons from 1966 to 1969. He tallied 96 goals and 130 assists for 226 points in 204 games played for the club. He would go on to play 145 games in the WHA for the New York Raiders, Los Angeles Sharks, and Michigan Stags/Baltimore Blades.

The Columbus Checkers became defunct in the spring of 1970 due to low attendance.

== Season-by-season results ==
Season	Games	Won	Lost	Tied	Points	Goals for	Goals against
1966–67	72	23	48	1	47	294	373
1967–68	72	32	30	10	74	312	300
1968–69	72	36	37	9	61	286	333
1969–70	72	24	36	12	60	287	307
