= Otto Frenzel =

Otto Frenzel III
- Born: December 1, 1930; Indianapolis, Indiana, U.S.
- Died: December 24, 2010 (aged 80); Indianapolis, Indiana, U.S.
- Known for: Banking Executive; Former owner of Pittsburgh Penguins

Otto N. "Nick" Frenzel III (December 1, 1930 – December 24, 2010) was an American former banking executive from 1956 until 1995. He was also a co-owner, secretary, and treasurer of the Pittsburgh Penguins from 1975 until 1977.

== Career ==
=== Banking ===
He was a 1954 graduate of the Wharton School of Business, University of Pennsylvania and served two years in the United States Air Force. Frenzel obtained the rank of 1st Lieutenant (O-2) before his release in 1956. He started his career in banking at Merchants National Bank and Trust Company in Indianapolis, Indiana in 1956 and was elected to the board in 1964. He later became president of the company in 1970 and chairman of the board in 1972. Otto was the sixth member of his family to serve as the Merchant's chief executive. He was elected chairman of the Merchants National Corporation (parent company of Merchants National Bank) in 1979 and was also elected chairman of the board of National City Bank of Indiana in 1992, serving in the role until his retirement in 1995.

=== Franchise owner ===
Frenzel, along with Wren Blair and Al Savill, was briefly co-owner, secretary, and treasurer of the NHL's Pittsburgh Penguins. The group had purchased the bankrupt team from the league for $3.8 million. Upon becoming owner of the Penguins, he dissolved the farm system to save money and was forced to trade draft picks to keep the team marginally competitive. Savill and Frenzel remained co-owners of the team for two seasons, eventually selling the team was sold to local shopping mall developer Edward J. DeBartolo Sr. in February 1977.

== Death ==
Frenzel died on December 24, 2010. He was 80 years old.
