= Al Savill =

American banker (1917–1989)

- Born: February 3, 1917; London, England
- Died: August 7, 1989 (aged 72); Orlando, Florida
- Known for: Mortgage banker; Former owner of Pittsburgh Penguins

Albert A. Savill (February 3, 1917 – August 7, 1989) was a mortgage banker, real estate developer and an owner of the Radisson Plaza Hotel Orlando.

== Career ==
Savill was born on February 3, 1917, in London but spent his childhood in Boston. He started his business career with John Hancock Mutual Life Insurance Co. and rose to assistant manager of the mortgage division when he left Boston in 1950.

Savill went on to found the Savill-Mahaffey Mortgage Co. in Indianapolis, which became the largest independent mortgage company in Indiana. He sold the company to American Fletcher National Bank in 1969. After moving to Orlando in 1979, he founded KMS Mortgage and Investment Co. in Seminole County.

Savill was an owner of the Indianapolis Capitols of the Continental Football League from 1963 to 1969. He was also an owner of the Columbus Owls of the International Hockey League from 1973 to 1978. Savill, along with Wren Blair and Otto Frenzel, bought the bankrupt Pittsburgh Penguins from the National Hockey League (the interim owners) in 1975 for $3.8 million (equivalent to $22.2 million in 2024). Upon becoming owner of the Penguins, he dissolved the farm system to save money and was forced to trade draft picks to keep the team marginally competitive. Savill and Frenzel remained part-owners of the team for two seasons, eventually selling the team to local shopping mall developer Edward J. DeBartolo Sr. in February 1977.

Savill was a partner in building the 342-room Radisson Plaza Hotel in downtown Orlando, Florida.

== Death ==
Savill died in Orlando in 1989 after a brief illness at the age of 72.
