= 1983–84 IHL season =

North American ice hockey season

The 1983–84 IHL season was the 39th season of the International Hockey League, a North American minor professional league. Seven teams participated in the regular season, and the Flint Generals won the Turner Cup.

== Regular season ==
	GP	W	L	T	GF	GA	Pts
Fort Wayne Komets	82	52	23	7	371	273	112
Milwaukee Admirals	82	46	30	6	403	335	101
Flint Generals	82	41	32	9	375	319	93
Toledo Goaldiggers	82	41	36	5	326	318	91
Kalamazoo Wings	82	37	38	7	333	316	83
Peoria Prancers	82	29	48	5	298	392	66
Muskegon Mohawks	82	19	58	5	282	435	46

== Turner Cup-Playoffs ==
Turner Cup Quarterfinal
4	Toledo Goaldiggers	2
5	Kalamazoo Wings	1

Turner Cup Semifinals
1	Fort Wayne Komets	2
4	Toledo Goaldiggers	4
2	Milwaukee Admirals	0
3	Flint Generals	4

Turner Cup Final
4	Toledo Goaldiggers	0
3	Flint Generals	4
