= Columbus Owls =

US minor league ice hockey team

- City: Columbus, Ohio
- League: International Hockey League
- Operated: 1973–1977
- Home arena: Fairgrounds Coliseum

Franchise history
- 1966–1970: Columbus Checkers
- 1971–1973: Columbus Golden Seals
- 1973–1977: Columbus Owls
- 1977: Dayton Owls
- 1977–1980: Grand Rapids Owls

The Columbus Owls were a minor league professional ice hockey team in the International Hockey League from 1973 to 1977. Prior to 1973, the team was known as the Columbus Golden Seals since 1971. After 1977, the team moved and became the Dayton Owls, and later the Grand Rapids Owls. The longtime owner of the team while it was in Columbus, British-born mortgage writer Al Savill, leveraged his ownership of the club to purchase the Pittsburgh Penguins in 1975, which he owned until 1977.
