= Dayton Owls =

US minor league ice hockey team

- City: Dayton, Ohio
- League: International Hockey League
- Operated: 1977
- Home arena: Hara Arena

Franchise history
- 1966–1970: Columbus Checkers
- 1971–1973: Columbus Golden Seals
- 1973–1977: Columbus Owls
- 1977: Dayton Owls
- 1977–1980: Grand Rapids Owls

The Dayton Owls was a minor league ice hockey team in the International Hockey League (IHL) during the 1977–78 season. The team was based in Dayton, Ohio, and played home games at the Hara Arena. The Columbus Owls had relocated to Dayton for the 1977–78 season, filling the void left by the Dayton Gems. Midway during their first season, on December 15, 1977 the Dayton Owls relocated to Grand Rapids, Michigan and became the Grand Rapids Owls.
