= 1976–77 IHL season =

North American ice hockey season

The 1976–77 IHL season was the 32nd season of the International Hockey League (IHL), a North American minor professional league. Nine teams participated in the regular season, and the Saginaw Gears won the Turner Cup.

== Inquiry into professional sports ==
IHL commissioner Bill Beagan testified at the July 1976 United States House of Representatives inquiry into professional sports, which investigated United States antitrust law, the effect of United States nationality law, finances of leagues and their franchises, and violence in sport. He stated that IHL players were not considered professionals despite receiving some compensation, and were classified as amateurs by the Amateur Hockey Association of the United States (AHAUS). He testified that the IHL was the largest financial contributor to AHAUS at the time, and had an agreement with the National Hockey League (NHL) to develop on-ice officials and players, but the World Hockey Association (WHA) showed no interested in negotiating any agreement. Beagan felt that the NHL was no longer able to contribute much towards amateur programs in the United States or Canada due to competition from the WHA, which undermined the IHL. He stated the league faced challenges to maintain quality due to changes to immigration laws which deterred participation by players and referees who were Canadian.

== Regular season ==
Northern Division	GP	W	L	T	GF	GA	Pts
Saginaw Gears	78	40	27	11	338	292	91
Kalamazoo Wings	78	38	27	13	325	290	89
Flint Generals	78	35	33	10	342	306	80
Muskegon Mohawks	78	31	36	11	294	322	73
Port Huron Flags	78	27	43	8	268	328	62

Southern Division	GP	W	L	T	GF	GA	Pts
Toledo Goaldiggers	78	40	31	7	321	317	87
Dayton Gems	78	35	38	5	304	312	75
Fort Wayne Komets	78	32	36	10	301	311	74
Columbus Owls	78	28	35	15	294	309	71

== Turner Cup-Playoffs ==
Turner Cup-Quarterfinals
N1	Saginaw Gears	4
N4	Muskegon Mohawks	3
N2	Kalamazoo Wings	4
N3	Flint Generals	1
S1	Toledo Goaldiggers	4
S4	Columbus Owls	3
S2	Dayton Gems	0
S3	Fort Wayne Komets	4

Turner Cup-Semifinals
N1	Saginaw Gears	4
N2	Kalamazoo Wings	1
S1	Toledo Goaldiggers	4
S3	Fort Wayne Komets	1

Turner Cup-Final
N1	Saginaw Gears	4
S1	Toledo Goaldiggers	3
