= 1981–82 IHL season =

North American ice hockey season

The 1981–82 IHL season was the 37th season of the International Hockey League, a North American minor professional league. Seven teams participated in the regular season, and the Toledo Goaldiggers won the Turner Cup.

== Regular season ==
	GP	W	L	T	GF	GA	Pts
Toledo Goaldiggers	82	53	25	4	407	320	111
Milwaukee Admirals	82	41	34	7	385	351	91
Kalamazoo Wings	82	41	36	5	355	333	89
Fort Wayne Komets	82	35	41	6	368	375	81
Saginaw Gears	82	36	38	8	401	402	80
Flint Generals	82	32	45	5	310	353	74
Muskegon Mohawks	82	30	49	3	319	411	64

== Turner Cup-Playoffs ==
Turner-Cup-Quarterfinals
1	Toledo Goaldiggers	4
6	Flint Generals	0
3	Kalamazoo Wings	1
4	Fort Wayne Komets	4
2	Milwaukee Admirals	1
5	Saginaw Gears	4

Turner-Cup-Semifinals
1	Toledo Goaldiggers
4	Fort Wayne Komets
5	Saginaw Gears

Turner-Cup-Final
1	Toledo Goaldiggers	4
5	Saginaw Gears	1

Semifinals

	GP	W	L	GF	GA	Pts
Saginaw Gears	4	3	1	22	16	6
Toledo Goaldiggers	4	2	2	21	20	4
Fort Wayne Komets	4	1	3	15	22	2
