= 1982–83 IHL season =

North American ice hockey season

The 1982–83 IHL season was the 38th season of the International Hockey League, a North American minor professional league. Eight teams participated in the regular season, and the Toledo Goaldiggers won the Turner Cup.

== Regular season ==
East Division	GP	W	L	T	GF	GA	Pts
Toledo Goaldiggers	82	51	21	10	362	269	113
Fort Wayne Komets	82	45	26	11	377	344	103
Flint Generals	82	35	36	11	317	340	82
Saginaw Gears	82	29	44	9	332	376	71

West Division	GP	W	L	T	GF	GA	Pts
Milwaukee Admirals	82	43	30	9	407	312	98
Kalamazoo Wings	82	32	44	6	311	341	76
Muskegon Mohawks	82	29	41	12	335	354	71
Peoria Prancers	82	25	47	10	330	435	62

== Turner Cup playoffs ==
Turner Cup quarterfinals
E2	Fort Wayne Komets	3
E3	Flint Generals	2
W2	Kalamazoo Wings	3
W3	Muskegon Mohawks	1

Turner Cup semifinals
E1	Toledo Goaldiggers	4
E2	Fort Wayne Komets	1
W1	Milwaukee Admirals	4
W2	Kalamazoo Wings	1

Turner Cup final
E1	Toledo Goaldiggers	4
W1	Milwaukee Admirals	2
