= 1978–79 IHL season =

North American ice hockey season

The 1978–79 IHL season was the 34th season of the International Hockey League, a North American minor professional league. Nine teams participated in the regular season, and the Kalamazoo Wings won the Turner Cup.

== Regular season ==
Northern Division	GP	W	L	T	GF	GA	Pts
Port Huron Flags	80	44	29	7	393	292	95
Kalamazoo Wings	80	40	28	12	368	327	92
Saginaw Gears	80	35	35	10	326	322	80
Flint Generals	80	35	40	5	356	349	75
Muskegon Mohawks	80	15	58	7	275	475	37

Southern Division	GP	W	L	T	GF	GA	Pts
Grand Rapids Owls	80	50	21	9	368	267	109
Fort Wayne Komets	80	45	29	6	386	327	96
Toledo Goaldiggers	80	35	32	13	320	302	83
Milwaukee Admirals	80	21	48	11	260	391	53

== Turner Cup-Playoffs ==
Turner Cup-Quarterfinals
N2	Kalamazoo Wings	4
N3	Saginaw Gears	0
N1	Port Huron Flags	3
N4	Flint Generals	4
S1	Grand Rapids Owls	4
S4	Milwaukee Admirals	3
S2	Fort Wayne Komets	4
S3	Toledo Goaldiggers	2

Turner Cup-Semifinals
N2	Kalamazoo Wings	4
N4	Flint Generals	0
S1	Grand Rapids Owls	4
S2	Fort Wayne Komets	3

Turner Cup-Final
N2	Kalamazoo Wings	4
S1	Grand Rapids Owls	3
