= Grand Rapids Owls =

- City: Byron Center, Michigan
- League: CSHL
- Home arena: Southside Community Ice Center
- Colors: Red, Black, White
- General manager: Jeff Laing
- Head coach: Greg Geldart

Franchise history
- 1993–2010: Grand Rapids Owls

The Grand Rapids Owls was a USA Hockey-sanctioned Tier III Junior A ice hockey team in the Central States Hockey League. The team played their home games at the Southside Community Ice Center in Byron Center, Michigan. The players, ages 16–20, carried amateur status under Junior A guidelines and hoped to earn a spot on higher levels of junior ice hockey in the United States and Canada, Canadian Major Junior, Collegiate, and eventually professional teams. The team suspended operations prior to the 2010-2011 season.

== Alumni ==
The Grand Rapids Owls had many alumni move on to higher levels of junior ice hockey, NCAA Division I, Division III, ACHA College, at professional levels.
