= 1977–78 IHL season =

North American ice hockey season

The 1977–78 IHL season was the 33rd season of the International Hockey League, a North American minor professional league. Nine teams participated in the regular season, and the Toledo Goaldiggers won the Turner Cup.

== Regular season ==
Northern Division	GP	W	L	T	GF	GA	Pts
Saginaw Gears	80	40	28	12	360	278	92
Kalamazoo Wings	80	35	31	14	315	288	84
Flint Generals	80	36	34	10	364	381	82
Port Huron Flags	80	33	32	15	322	331	81
Muskegon Mohawks	80	27	42	11	290	322	65

Southern Division	GP	W	L	T	GF	GA	Pts
Fort Wayne Komets	80	40	23	17	305	287	97
Toledo Goaldiggers	80	34	28	18	331	316	86
Milwaukee Admirals	80	27	38	15	257	299	69
Dayton/Grand Rapids Owls	80	27	43	10	290	332	64

== Turner Cup-Playoffs ==
Turner-Cup-Quarterfinals
S1	Fort Wayne Komets	4
N5	Muskegon Mohawks	2
S2	Toledo Goaldiggers	4
S3	Milwaukee Admirals	1
N2	Kalamazoo Wings	4
N3	Flint Generals	1
N1	Saginaw Gears	1
N4	Port Huron Flags	4

Turner-Cup-Semifinals
S1	Fort Wayne Komets	1
S2	Toledo Goaldiggers	4
N2	Kalamazoo Wings	1
N4	Port Huron Flags	4

Turner-Cup-Final
S2	Toledo Goaldiggers	4
N4	Port Huron Flags	3
