= Grand Rapids Owls (1977–1980) =

US minor league ice hockey team

- City: Grand Rapids, Michigan
- League: International Hockey League
- Operated: 1977
- Home arena: Hara Arena

Franchise history
- 1966–1970: Columbus Checkers
- 1971–1973: Columbus Golden Seals
- 1973–1977: Columbus Owls
- 1977: Dayton Owls
- 1977–1980: Grand Rapids Owls

The Grand Rapids Owls are a defunct professional ice hockey team, who were members of the International Hockey League from the 1977–1978 season to 1979–1980 season. The Owls were based in Grand Rapids, Michigan, and played their home games in Stadium Arena. The team started the 1977–1978 season as the Columbus Owls, but relocated to Dayton and, finally, to Grand Rapids on December 15, 1977. Their team colors were red, white, and black.

A "Junior B" team used the same name and logo until 2010.

== Standings ==
Year	GP	W	L	T	PTS	GF	GA	Pct	Standings	Playoffs
1977–1978	80	27	43	10	64	290	332	.400	9 of 9	Did not qualify
1978–1979	80	50	21	9	109	368	267	.681	1 of 9	Won quarterfinals Milwaukee Admirals 4–3, won semifinals Fort Wayne Komets 4–3, lost Turner Cup Finals Kalamazoo Wings 4–3
1979–1980	80	27	41	12	66	327	340	.413	9 of 10	Did not qualify
Totals	240	104	105	31	239	985	939	.498		
