= List of Pittsburgh Penguins owners =

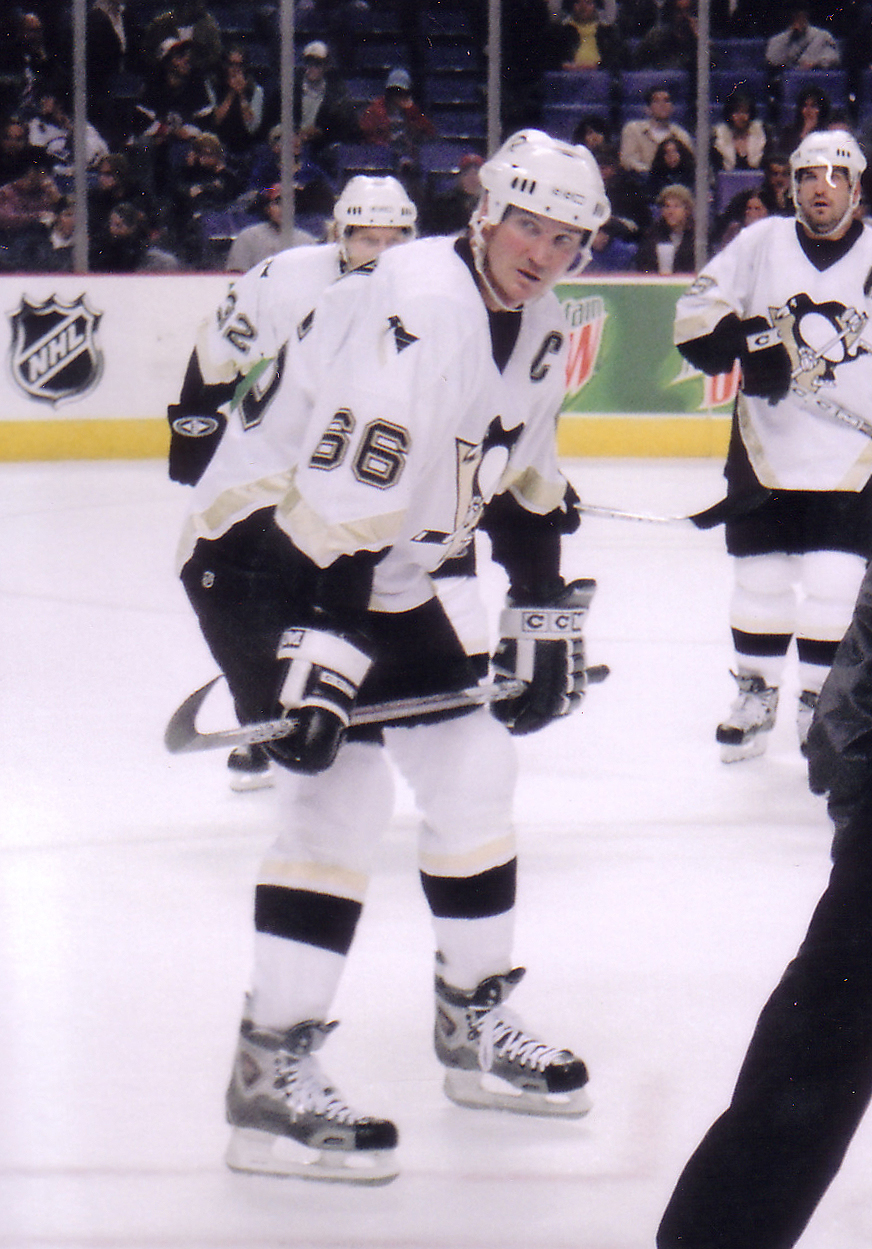
Mario Lemieux is the current owner of the Penguins, and former player for the team 1984–2005.

This is a list of Pittsburgh Penguins owners. There have been 11 ownership groups for the Penguins franchise since the team's founding in 1967. The Penguins' Mario Lemieux was a Penguins majority owner before his group sold ownership of the team to Fenway Sports Group in December 2021. He has maintained a minority ownership. Lemieux Group LP, who purchased the Penguins in 1999 and brought the club out of bankruptcy, also worked out a deal with the city of Pittsburgh in 2007 for a new multi-purpose arena, ensuring that the franchise remains in Pittsburgh.

== Ownerships ==
1	Jack McGregor & Peter Block	June 1965 – March 1968
2	Donald Parsons	March 1968 – April 1971
3	Peter Block, Thayer Potter, Elmore Keener, & Peter Burchfield	April 1971 – June 1975
4	National Hockey League	June 1975 – July 1975
5	Al Savill, Otto Frenzel, & Wren Blair	July 1975 – Feb. 1976
6	Al Savill & Otto Frenzel	February 1976 – February 1977
7	Edward J. DeBartolo Sr.	February 1977 – November 1991
8	Howard Baldwin, Morris Belzberg, & Thomas Ruta	November 1991 – May 1997
9	Howard Baldwin, Moris Belzberg, Thomas Ruta, & Roger Marino	May 1997 – September 1999
10	Mario Lemieux & Ronald Burkle (Lemieux Group LP)	September 1999 – September 2011
11	Mario Lemieux & Ronald Burkle (Lemieux Group LP) & John Surma	September 2011 – December 2016
12	Lemieux Group LP, John Surma and Debra Cafaro	December 2016 – December 2021
13	Fenway Sports Group, Mario Lemieux, Ron Burkle	December 2021 – Present

== See also ==
- List of Pittsburgh Penguins head coaches
- List of Pittsburgh Penguins players
