= Elmore Keener =

Elmore Lee Keener, Jr. (November 5, 1935 - October 22, 1973) was a National Hockey League co-owner of the Pittsburgh Penguins starting from April 21, 1971, until his death from lung cancer.

Elmore was the son of Emelia Keener and Elmore Lee Keener Sr. and lived in Freeport, New York. In 1956 he married Janet Rockwell Bygate in Pittsburgh at St. Andrew's Episcopal Church. On April 21, 1971, Keener, Peter Block, Peter Burchfield and Thayer Potter, who were all men in their late thirties at the time, purchased the Pittsburgh Penguins for $7 million ($56.7 million today). When the deal was announced Potter stated that the group "bought the Penguins as a matter of civic pride".

He was also a vice-president and partner with Charles G. Peelor and Co., located inside of the Grant Building. Prior to that Keener made his fortune as a longtime law partner in the Pittsburgh firm of Arthur, LeStrange & Short. He was related to the founding and longtime managing family of Rockwell International, also based in the city. He was a past president of the Pittsburgh Securities Traders Association and a past governor of the Bond Club of Pittsburgh. He also was a director of the Pittsburgh Testing Laboratories.

Elmore died on October 22, 1973, at West Penn Hospital at the age of 37.
