= Thomas M. Nolan =

American politician (1916–1989)

Thomas Martin Nolan

Democratic Leader of the Pennsylvania Senate
- In office January 7, 1975 – September 1, 1977
- Preceded by: Thomas Lamb
- Succeeded by: Henry Messinger

Member of the Pennsylvania Senate from the 44th district
- In office January 5, 1971 – November 30, 1978
- Preceded by: Jack McGregor
- Succeeded by: Frank Pecora
- Constituency: Parts of Allegheny and Westmoreland Counties

Member of the Pennsylvania House of Representatives from the 34th district
- In office January 7, 1969 – November 30, 1970
- Preceded by: District Created
- Succeeded by: Richard Frankenburg

Personal details
- Born: October 24, 1916 Pittsburgh, Pennsylvania
- Died: April 7, 1989 (aged 72)
- Party: Democratic

Military service
- Allegiance: United States
- Branch/service: United States Army
- Years of service: World War II

Thomas Martin Nolan (October 24, 1916 – April 7, 1989) was an American politician from Pennsylvania who served as a Democratic member of the Pennsylvania House of Representatives for the 34th district from 1969 to 1970 and the Pennsylvania State Senate for the 44th district from 1971 to 1978.

== Early life ==
Nolan was born in Pittsburgh, Pennsylvania and graduated from Central Catholic High School. He served as a corporal in the U.S. Army during World War II and was awarded the Purple Heart and 3 battle stars.

== Career ==
He represented the 34th legislative district in the Pennsylvania House of Representatives from 1969 to 1970. He was then elected to represent the 44th senatorial district in the Pennsylvania Senate in 1970.

During a 1971 debate, Governor Milton Shapp's proposed a 5% state income tax. Nolan was one of two democratic holdouts in the Pennsylvania Senate. When the suggested rate was reduced to 3.5%, Nolan finally agreed to vote in favor of it. It was alleged that Nolan's brother Edward, was offered a bribe in exchange for convincing his brother to vote in favor of the tax. The matter was referred to the FBI, the Allegheny County District Attorney, and U.S. Attorney Richard Thornburgh, but no charges were ever filed.

Thom Nolan served in the Senate until 1978.

He and three other defendants, including Vince Fumo and Pete Carmiel, were accused of placing "ghost workers" on state payroll. The charges were later thrown out.

He died on April 7, 1989, in Braddock, Pennsylvania and is interred at Church Hill Cemetery in Wilkins Township, Pennsylvania.
