= Merchants Fund =

American foundation

Founded in 1854, The Merchants Fund is a Philadelphia foundation which provides grants to business persons with financial challenges. Currently, The Merchants Fund offers small grants to Philadelphia businesses with financial needs in the form of business stabilization, loan matching, and commercial corridor grants.

== History ==
=== The Mercantile Beneficial Association of Philadelphia (1842-present) ===
The Merchants Fund evolved from The Mercantile Beneficial Association of Philadelphia, an organization founded in 1842 to provide its members with business advice, networking opportunities, and protection from financial failure. At this time, there were no health insurance options, disability protections, or pension plans in the United States. The Mercantile Beneficial Association's Relief Committee assisted needy merchants, regardless of membership status, but the needs in the community outpaced the committee's capacity, and the group recognized the need to found an independent organization for this charitable work.

=== The Merchants Fund (1854-2007) ===
1853 meeting minutes listing the original Board of Managers, The Merchants Fund

In January 1854, The Merchants Fund's act to incorporate was signed by Governor William Bigler, and it began to provide aid to business persons facing financial difficulties, especially those who were elderly or sick. The founding of The Merchants Fund occurred just prior to the City of Philadelphia's Act of Consolidation, which expanded the city's boundaries to include the areas of growth, particularly north of Vine Street, establishing boundaries synonymous with Philadelphia County. The Act of Consolidation was driven by revenue needs, lawlessness, and rioting. In founding the Merchants Fund as an independent organization, members prioritized creating a safe environment for business and keeping merchants productive members of society.

Men of the business community could join The Merchants Fund as yearly or lifetime members, and within the first year, membership numbered over 300. Between 1866 and 1880, The Merchants Fund also made appeals to individuals, banks, insurance companies, and other businesses to establish a permanent fund. Most of the organization's assets were invested in real estate and rail, and there is overlap between the members and officers of The Merchants Fund and the growth of the local, regional and national rail systems at this time.

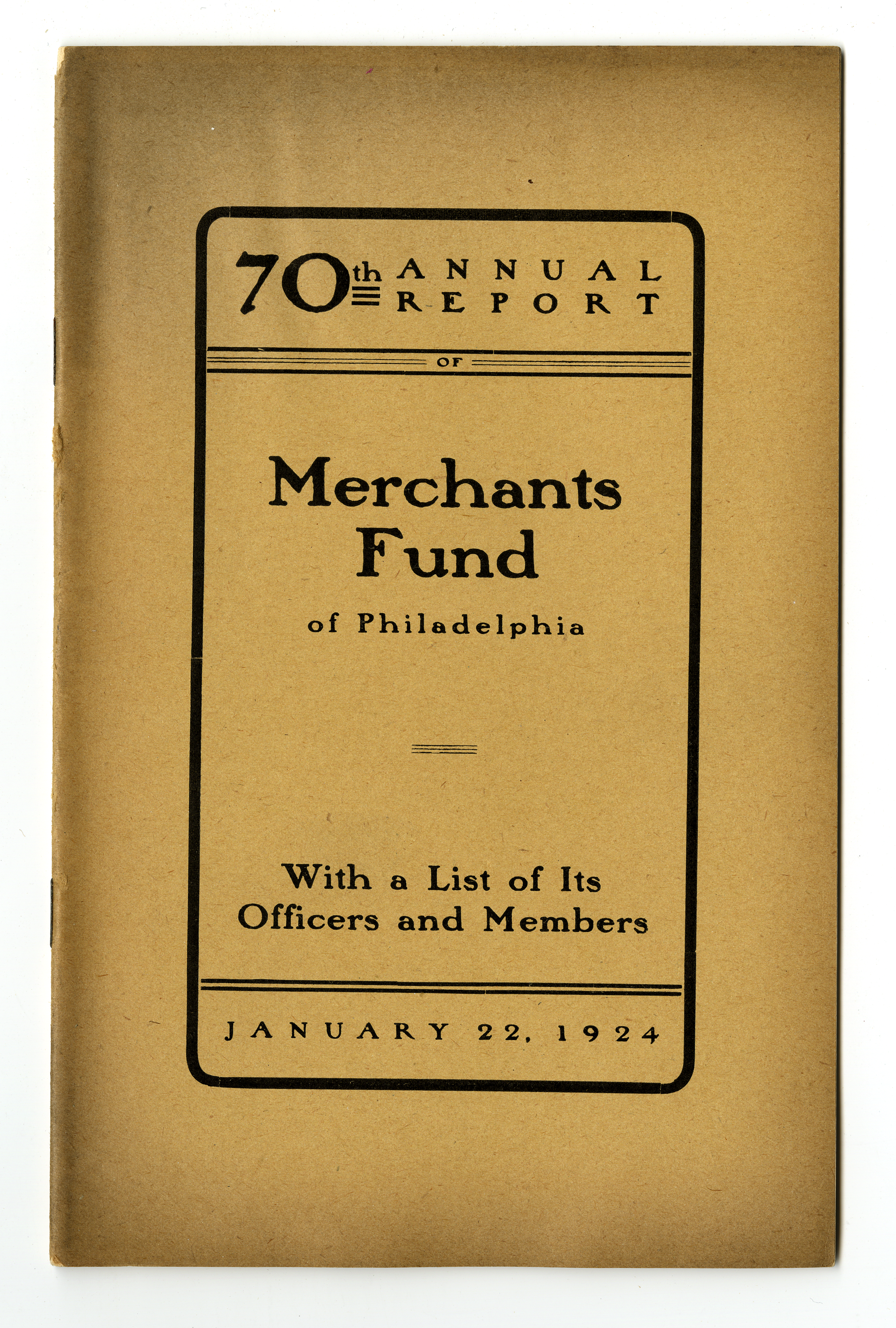
Annual Report from January 22, 1924

Beneficiaries largely received aid through applications in which they would describe their need and occasionally state that if they did not receive aid, they would be forced to become public charges. The Fund members frequently tried to keep merchants from this fate, particularly those that they considered visible and respectable in the community. To confirm neediness or illness, doctors visited the business person and his family, and applicants could apply for short or long-term aid. Minutes repeatedly state that beneficiaries were respectable people who have lost their means of income, and their names were kept strictly confidential among the five members of the executive committee. Meeting minutes listed grantees anonymously with a number and a description of the individual's circumstances, and the grantees’ names were kept confidential in a master book by the secretary.

Letters from beneficiaries were frequently recorded in meeting minutes, and this letter from an 1876 beneficiary illustrates the language used to express gratitude:

I was told it [the aid] was for my own comfort. I at once got some clothes and other necessities which I had not known how to get; and it has continued since—so is my bread and water provided for. How wonderfully that the Lord has raised a company of gentlemen of sufficient means to take care of the old and broken down men who have kept their all and would otherwise suffer want. I cannot attempt to express my gratitude to you all, but I will leave it to the Lord, to repay your kindness to you and yours to the latest generations, May we all meet in heaven to part no more forever, is the earnest prayer of your greatly favored friend.

Recipients used the aid to feed and clothe their families, cover medical expenses in their final years, and finance other basic necessities like heating during the winter. In 1886, the original charter was amended to extend relief to the widows of deceased beneficiaries. In the early years of the fund, this amounted to an average of around $200 per year in smaller installments. By the 1970s, the average grantee received around $2000 per year. The Merchants Fund continued as a membership organization through the late 1970s.

==== Selected Members ====
- Matthias W. Baldwin
- Adolph Borie
- Henry Disston & Sons
- Anthony Joseph Drexel
- Frederick Fraley
- Henry H. Houston
- Isaac H. Clothier & Justus C. Strawbridge
- Richard Wood
- George Stanley Woodward

==== Selected Bequeathors ====
- Simon Muhr
- Lewis Elkin
- Elliott Cresson

=== Supporting 21st Century Merchants (2007-Present) ===
In 2007, many of the business persons and families supported by The Merchants Fund were no longer living, and the organization revisited its mission. The board determined it would either have to become a social services agency and hire permanent social workers for remaining beneficiaries or offer grants to contemporary merchants. Recognizing the expertise of existing organizations such as Philadelphia Corporation for Aging, The Merchants Fund chose to extend its mission to contemporary merchants. The fund also continues to provide assistance to aged and indigent merchants who began receiving aid in the 20th century, and as of 2012, 27 individuals and families still receive aid.

As funds became available, The Merchants Fund refocused its mission from supporting retired and indigent merchants to aiding contemporary merchants across the spectrum of businesses, from neighborhood small businesses to high-growth companies. This shift in mission occurred around the 2008 recession. Today, the fund distributes 5% of its assets annually, and it is governed by a board of managers of up to 18 people.

==== Collaboration with Philadelphia Department of Commerce for ReStore ====
In recognition of The Merchants Fund's new mission, Philadelphia Department of Commerce contracted with The Merchants Fund to select high quality retail on corridors and in neighborhoods for macro grants up to $50,000 from their 2006 bond issue. This money was designated to create or support high quality retail on business corridors in neighborhoods, and the grants were called ReStore Retail Incentive Grants. These projects were completed between 2008 and 2012.

== See also ==
- History of Philadelphia
- The Merchants Fund
- Philadelphia Department of Commerce
