= Repete =

Repete may refer to:

- Re-Pete, a former mascot of the Pittsburgh Penguins hockey team
- Pete Francis Heimbold (born 1975), American musician
- Pete Dzoghi, American comedian
- Repete (film), short film by Czech animator Michaela Pavlátová

== See also ==
- Repeat (disambiguation)
