= Jack McGregor =

American politician and lawyer (1934–2026)

Member of the Pennsylvania Senate from the 44th district
- In office January 1, 1963 – November 30, 1970
- Preceded by: Joseph D. Ripp
- Succeeded by: Thomas M. Nolan

Personal details
- Born: Jack Edwin McGregor; September 22, 1934 Kittanning, Pennsylvania, U.S.
- Died: January 6, 2026 (aged 91)
- Party: Republican
- Spouses: Carol Dangerfield (divorced); Mary-Jane Foster (divorced)
- Children: 4
- Education: Yale University (BS); University of Pittsburgh (JD)

Military service
- Branch/service: United States Marine Corps
- Rank: Captain

Jack Edwin McGregor (September 22, 1934 – January 6, 2026) was an American politician and lawyer who was a member of the Pennsylvania State Senate and the founder of the National Hockey League's Pittsburgh Penguins. He later resided in Bridgeport, Connecticut, where he served as counsel to Cohen and Wolf, P.C., and as an advisor to companies looking to create business opportunities in the Bridgeport region. McGregor also served as a consultant to other companies seeking to expand their market share in the area.

== Early life, education, and career ==
McGregor was born in Kittanning, Pennsylvania, on September 22, 1934, to parents Leah and Russell McGregor. He studied at various universities and received his Bachelor of Science degree from Yale University in 1956, where he was a member of the Skull and Bones society. McGregor received his Juris Doctor degree from the University of Pittsburgh School of Law, where he was named class valedictorian and editor-in-chief of the University of Pittsburgh Law Review. He later receive an honorary Doctor of Laws degree from Quinnipiac University in 1995. After college, McGregor served as a captain in the United States Marine Corps. He was later allowed to practice law in Connecticut, Pennsylvania, and the District of Columbia.

In the 1960s, McGregor practiced law in the Pittsburgh and Washington offices of the law firm Reed Smith LLP. In the early 1970s, he held appointive regulatory positions in the federal government, and then became general counsel of a major electric utility. He later served as general counsel and then as chief operating officer of a multinational oil company.

In 1993, he married his second wife, Mary-Jane Foster.

== Political career ==
McGregor was a Republican member of the Pennsylvania State Senate from 1963 to 1970, representing the Allegheny County-based 44th district. In 1970, he ran an unsuccessful campaign for governor of Pennsylvania. In 2004, he was appointed to the advisory board of the Great Lakes St. Lawrence Seaway Development Corporation by president George W. Bush. McGregor continued to support Republican candidates by contributing funds to the Connecticut Republican Party. During the 2008 presidential election, he supported the Republican ticket of John McCain and Sarah Palin.

== Sports franchises ==
=== Pittsburgh Penguins ===
In the spring of 1965, McGregor travelled along the Pennsylvania Turnpike to Harrisburg with a law school classmate, Peter Block, who was an enthusiastic ice hockey fan. During the long car ride, McGregor stated that he felt that Pittsburgh had not reached its potential as a sports town. This led both men to examine ways to bring the National Hockey League back to Pittsburgh after a 35-year absence.

McGregor's plan involved lobbying some of his campaign contributors who were avid sports fans, as well as community leaders. He formed a group of local investors for the Pittsburgh franchise that included H. J. Heinz Company CEO H. J. Heinz II, Pittsburgh Steelers owner Art Rooney, and Mellon family heir Richard Mellon Scaife. The 1967 NHL expansion depended on securing votes from the then-current NHL owners. To ensure Pittsburgh would be selected for expansion, McGregor enlisted the help of Rooney to petition votes from Jim Norris, owner of the Chicago Black Hawks, and Bruce Norris, owner of the Detroit Red Wings. The effort was a success and on February 8, 1966, the National Hockey League granted a franchise to Pittsburgh. The Penguins paid $2.5 million for its entry to the NHL and $750,000 more for start-up costs. The Civic Arena's capacity was boosted from 10,732 to 12,500 to meet the NHL requirements for expansion. The Penguins also paid an indemnification bill to settle with the Detroit Red Wings that held a minor league team in Pittsburgh, the Pittsburgh Hornets. McGregor was named president and chief executive officer by the investor group, and he represented Pittsburgh on the NHL’s Board of Governors. McGregor and Block each owned 12.5 percent of the team.

The team was officially named on February 10, 1967, after more than 26,000 entries from a newspaper contest were fielded. McGregor's wife, Carol, named them the "Penguins" since the team would play in the Civic Arena, which had been dubbed "The Igloo" by the locals. Meanwhile, McGregor obtained Andy Bathgate for the team's first pick in the 1967 NHL expansion draft.

McGregor was also responsible for the Penguins' first mascot, Penguin Pete, an Ecuadorian-born penguin on loan from the Pittsburgh Zoo. The bird was meant as a surprise for McGregor's son, Doug, for his ninth birthday. Pete made a six appearances at various Penguins home games before dying from pneumonia. McGregor sent Pete to an area taxidermist, and was he later displayed in the lobby of the Penguins team offices at the arena until several callers objected to the stuffed bird.

On October 11, 1967, NHL president Clarence Campbell and McGregor jointly dropped the ceremonial first puck of the Penguins opening home game against the Montreal Canadiens. The Penguins would go 27–34–13 that year. However, during the 1969–70 NHL season, financial issues caught up with the team. The investors were "tapped out" after having invested in a professional soccer team, the Pittsburgh Phantoms. The Penguins were sold to the Donald Parsons Group out of Michigan. The Penguins would be sold by Parsons three years later.

=== Amarillo Wranglers ===
McGregor also founded the Penguins' second farm team, the Amarillo Wranglers, and served as team president. The Wranglers participated in the 1968–69 season, then suspended operations. After a one season hiatus, the team returned for the 1970–71 CHL season, but permanently ceased operations after that season.

=== Bridgeport Bluefish ===
In 1998, McGregor and his wife, Mary-Jane Foster, founded the Bridgeport Bluefish, a minor league baseball franchise in the Atlantic League. Prior to the 2006 season, the franchise was purchased by Get Hooked, LLC, a group of investors from Fairfield County, Connecticut that includes McGregor and Foster as co-owners. However, Get Hooked dropped the Bluefish prior to the 2008 season in favor of seeking a new ballpark for the city of Yonkers, New York. The Bluefish were purchased by Frank Boulton, who is also the owner of the Long Island Ducks and the founder of the Atlantic League.

== Later activities ==
Prior to joining the firm of Cohen and Wolf, McGregor served as president and CEO of Connecticut-based water utility Aquarion Company. Prior to that, he operated his own venture capital company for six years. McGregor also served as president of the National Association of Water Companies, chairman of the Connecticut Department of Environmental Protection's Pollution Prevention Committee, and chairman of the Bridgeport Regional Business Council. In addition, he served on the boards of Fairfield University; the University of Bridgeport; and the Barnum Museum; and on the Governor's Greenway Committee; the Bridgeport Regional Economic Development Committee; and the Governor's Team Bridgeport.

McGregor died on January 6, 2026, at the age of 91.

On August 20, 2026, Jack was selected to the Class of 2026 for induction into the Pittsburgh Penguins Hall of Fame. Going in alongside him will be Larry Murphy, Jim Rutherford, & Marc-Andre Fleury before the team he help found plays against the Ottawa Senators on November 14th.

== Jack McGregor Scholarship ==
The Jack McGregor Scholarship is an endowment at McGregor's alma mater, the University of Pittsburgh, with the purpose of providing scholarship support to financially needy students who have demonstrated strong academic performance in prior studies and who have made a commitment to utilize their law degree working in the public sector.

Pennsylvania State Senate
Preceded by Joseph D. Ripp	Member of the Pennsylvania State Senate from the 44th district 1963–1970	Succeeded by Thomas M. Nolan
Sporting positions
Preceded by First	Owner of the Pittsburgh Penguins; 1965–1968	Succeeded by Donald Parsons Group
