= Laura Foreman (journalist) =

American journalist (1943–2020)

Laura Foreman (June 11, 1943 – June 4, 2020) was an American journalist and the first woman political writer at The Philadelphia Inquirer. She was the first reporter who lost their job due to an affair.

== Early life and education ==
Laura Virginia Foreman was born on June 11, 1943, in Anniston, Alabama to Virginia and journalist Wilmer L. Foreman. She attended Emory University and graduated in 1965 with a degree in English literature.

== Career ==
After graduation, she worked at Southern Bell Telephone Company until 1967 when she became a reporter for The Associated Press in New Orleans. In 1969, she became a reporter for the United Press International.

In 1973, Foreman became a features reporter for The Philadelphia Inquirer after meeting the editor Eugene L. Roberts Jr. when he was the chief Southern and civil rights correspondent for The New York Times. She was The Inquirer's first woman political writer where she focused on the 1975 mayoral candidates Frank L. Rizzo and Peter J. Camiel. She succeeded reporter Jon Katz (who was named suburban editor) and his biased writing of the race. Through her beat, she met State Senator Henry Cianfrani who became one of her sources and subjects.

=== Ethics investigation ===
In 1977, she moved to The New York Times. In August 1977, The Inquirer reported that she was romantically involved with Cianfrani as a part of an FBI investigation on his income and expenditures, and questions began to swell about her professional integrity. It was also reported she had received gifts from Cianfrani during her time at the paper. When asked about the relationship, Foreman is quoted as saying "I don't believe I have done anything wrong." Editors at both papers reviewed her work, noting that it comported with the "highest ethical standards."

The Inquirer's investigative reporters Donald L. Barlett and James B. Steele began looking into the matter. Their 5-page, 17,000-word article exposed internal rivalries at the paper and found that editors had looked the other way to protect a favored reporter. The Times asked her to leave despite having not found proof that she had violated the terms of employment.The Inquirer developed their first ethics code which called for staff to avoid conflict, talk to their managers about any issues, and banned gifts from sources. Foreman was the first woman to lose her job because of a relationship with a source; it also ended her journalism career. Noting the harsh punishment in the case, critics saw a double standard, with different consequences for men and women in similar circumstances. At least one male critic, former colleague Lee Winfrey, cited her attractiveness and success as a cause of jealousy from female colleagues, and of resentment from male colleagues.

In 1977, Cianfrani was indicted by a federal grand jury on charges of corruption. He was convicted and imprisoned, and was released in 1980.

=== Time Life ===
After the investigation, Foreman changed paths, and began work as a writer and editor at Time-Life Books. At the height of the position, she managed 20 people and freelanced for Discovery Publishing. In the 1990s, she left Washington for New Orleans where she freelanced, moving to Memphis after Hurricane Katrina.

== Personal life ==
On July 14, 1980, Foreman married Cianfrani. She died on June 4, 2020, in Memphis, Tennessee.
