= Pennsylvania's 1st Senate district =

American legislative district

Pennsylvania's 1st State Senate district
Senator
Nikil Saval; D–Philadelphia
- Population (2021): 250,243

Pennsylvania State Senate District 1 includes part of Philadelphia County. It is district currently represented by democratic State Senator Nikil Saval.

== District profile ==
The district includes the following areas:

Philadelphia County:

- Ward 01
- Ward 02
- Ward 05
- Ward 08
- Ward 18
- Ward 25 [PART, Divisions 01, 04 and 07]
- Ward 26 [PART, Divisions 01, 02, 03, 20 and 23]
- Ward 30
- Ward 31
- Ward 39
- Ward 40 [PART, Divisions 30, 38 and 40]

== Senators ==
Representative	Party	Years	District home	Note
Lindsay Coats	Federalist	1791 – 1797		
Dennis Whelen	Federalist	1795 – 1801		
Samuel King	Federalist	1799 – 1801		
William Rodman	Jeffersonian Republican	1799 – 1803		U.S. Representative for Pennsylvania's 2nd congressional district from 1811 to 1813
Melchior Rahm	Jeffersonian Republican	1805 – 1813		
John Barclay	Federalist	1811 – 1813		Mayor of Philadelphia from 1791 to 1793
Nicholas Biddle	Federalist	1813 – 1815		3rd president of the Second Bank of the United States from 1813 to 1815
Jacob Shearer	Democratic-Republican	1813 – 1815		
William Maghee	Federalist	1815 – 1817		
John Read	Federalist	1817 – 1818		
Michael Leib	Democratic-Republican	1818 – 1821		U.S. Representative for Pennsylvania's 2nd congressional district from 1799 to 1803. U.S. Representative for Pennsylvania's 1st congressional district from 1803 to 1806. U.S. Senator for Pennsylvania from 1809 to 1814
Condy Raguet	Federalist	1817 – 1821		1st United States Ambassador to Brazil from 1825 to 1827
Robert McMullin	Federalist	1819 – 1820		
James Robertson	Federalist	1821 – 1823		
John Wurtz	Federalist	1821 – 1823		
George Emlen	Federalist	1823 – 1825		
John Hare Powel	Federalist	1827 – 1829		Colonel in the U.S. Army. Founder of the Pennsylvania Agricultural Society in 1823
William Boyd	Democratic	1831 – 1833		
David S. Hassinger	Democratic	1831 – 1833		
George W. Toland	Democratic	1833 – 1835		U.S. Representative for Pennsylvania's 2nd congressional district from 1837 to 1843
Abraham Miller	Democratic	1835 – 1837		
Frederick Fraley	Whig	1837 – 1839		One of the founders of the Franklin Institute in Philadelphia
Henry S. Spackman	Washington	1839 – 1843		
Jacob Gratz	Democratic	1841 – 1842		
William Bradford Reed	Whig	1841 – 1842		Pennsylvania Attorney General from 1838 to 1839. U.S. Minister to China in 1857
William A. Crabb	Whig	1843 – 1855		
Joseph Bailey	Democratic	1843 – 1851		U.S. Representative for Pennsylvania's 16th congressional district from 1861 to 1863. U.S. Representative for Pennsylvania's 15th congressional district from 1863 to 1865
Charles L. Gibbons	Whig	1845 – 1847		
Benjamin Matthias	Whig	1847 – 1851		
Charles O'Neill	Whig	1853 – 1854		U.S. Representative for Pennsylvania's 2nd congressional district from 1863 to 1871 and from 1873 to 1893
Eli Kirk Price	Whig	1853 – 1855		
Harlan G. Ingram	Democratic	1857 – 1858		
Isaac Nathaniel Marselis	Democratic	1857 – 1859		
Samuel Jackson Randall	Democratic	1857 – 1859		U.S. Representative for Pennsylvania's 1st congressional district from 1863 to 1875 and from Pennsylvania's 3rd congressional district from 1875 to 1890. 29th Speaker of the United States House of Representatives from 1876 to 1881
Richardson L. Wright	Democratic	1857 – 1859		
John H. Parker	Republican	1859 – 1860		
George Rush Smith	Republican	1861 – 1862		
Cornelius M. Donovan	Democratic	1861 – 1865		
Jeremiah Nichols	Whig	1861 – 1865		
Abraham Heistand Glatz	Democratic	1861 – 1867		
George C. Connell	Republican	1861 – 1869		
Jacob Elwood Ridgway	Republican	1863 – 1865		
Stephen Fowler Wilson	Republican	1863 – 1865		U.S. Representative for Pennsylvania's 18th congressional district from 1865 to 1869
William McCandless	Democratic	1867 – 1868		Colonel in the Union Army during the U.S. Civil War and the first Secretary of Internal Affairs of Pennsylvania
William W. Watt	Republican	1869 – 1870		
John B. Warfel	Republican	1869 – 1875		
Robert Porter Dechert	Democratic	1871 – 1872		
James B. Alexander	Republican	1873 – 1875		
Daniel Ermentrout	Democratic	1873 – 1887		U.S. Representative for Pennsylvania's 8th congressional district from 1881 to 1889 and Pennsylvania's 9th congressional district from 1897 to 1899
George Handy Smith	Republican	1875 – 1895		
William Wagner	Whig	1883 – 1884		Founder of the Wagner Free Institute of Science
George Augustus Vare	Republican	1897 – 1907		
Edwin H. Vare	Republican	1909 – 1921		
William Scott Vare	Republican	1922 – 1923		U.S. Senator-elect for Pennsylvania from 1927 to 1929. Never seated and removed in 1929 due to allegations of corruption and voter fraud
Flora M. Vare	Republican	1925 – 1928		First woman to serve in the Pennsylvania Senate
Lawrence E. McCrossin	Democratic	1929 – 1930		
Joseph C. Trainer	Republican	1931 – 1935		
Anthony J. DiSilvestro	Democratic	1937 – 1965		
Henry J. Cianfrani	Democratic	1967 – 1977		Resigned on December 15, 1977
Vincent J. Fumo	Democratic	1978 – 2008		Convicted of 137 federal corruption charges and sentenced to 55 months in federal prison
Larry Farnese	Democratic	2009 – 2021		Elected November 4, 2008. Lost renomination in 2020.
Nikil Saval	Democratic	2021 – present		Elected November 3, 2020

== Recent election results ==
PA Senate election, 2024
Party	Candidate	Votes	%
Democratic	Nikil Saval	109,193	99.00
Total votes		110,301	100.0
Democratic hold			

PA Senate election, 2020
Party	Candidate	Votes	%
Democratic	Nikil Saval	124,514	100
Total votes		124,514	100.0
Democratic hold			

Democratic primary, 2020
Party	Candidate	Votes	%
Democratic	Nikil Saval	35,747	56.9%
Democratic	Larry Farnese (incumbent)	27,025	43.1%
Total votes		62,772	100.0%

PA Senate election, 2016
Party	Candidate	Votes	%
Democratic	Larry Farnese (incumbent)	114,099	100
Total votes		114,099	100.0
Democratic hold			

Democratic primary, 2016
Party	Candidate	Votes	%
Democratic	Larry Farnese (incumbent)	37,647	74.3%
Democratic	John Morley	13,049	25.7%
Total votes		50,696	100.0%

PA Senate election, 2012
Party	Candidate	Votes	%
Democratic	Larry Farnese (incumbent)	95,612	82.4
Republican	Alfonso Gambone, Jr.	20,421	17.6
Total votes		116,033	100.0
Democratic hold			

PA Senate election, 2008
Party	Candidate	Votes	%
Democratic	Larry Farnese	95,727	80.8
Republican	Jack Morley	22,698	19.2
Total votes		118,425	100.0
Democratic hold			

Democratic primary, 2008
Party	Candidate	Votes	%
Democratic	Larry Farnese	30,879	42.9%
Democratic	Johnny Dougherty	27,331	37.9%
Democratic	Anne Dicker	13,813	19.2%
Total votes		72,023	100.0%
