= John V. Creely =

American politician

Member of the U.S. House of Representatives from Pennsylvania's 2nd district
- In office March 4, 1871 – March 3, 1873
- Preceded by: Charles O'Neill
- Succeeded by: Charles O'Neill

Member of the Philadelphia Common Council from Ward 7
- In office October 9, 1867 – October 12, 1870 Serving with John Bardsley
- Preceded by: Thomas Little
- Succeeded by: William Grier, William Divine

Personal details
- Birth name: John Vauclain Creely
- Profession: Attorney
- Born: November 14, 1839; Philadelphia, Pennsylvania, U.S.
- Disappeared: August 31, 1872 (aged 32); Washington, D.C., U.S.
- Status: Declared dead in absentia on September 28, 1900
- Political party: Republican; Independent Republican; Liberal Republican
- Military career
- Allegiance: United States; Pennsylvania
- Branch: Pennsylvania Militia
- Service years: 1861–1872
- Rank: Captain
- Units: Keystone Battery, Pennsylvania Light Artillery Regiment
- Conflicts: American Civil War

John Vauclain Creely (Note: His middle name is sometimes misspelled "Vaudain" and his last name is sometimes misspelled "Creeley".) (November 14, 1839 – disappeared August 1872, pronounced dead September 28, 1900) was an American attorney and politician from Philadelphia, Pennsylvania. A Republican, he was most notable for his service as a member of the Philadelphia Common Council from 1867 to 1870 and a member of the United States House of Representatives from 1871 to 1873. Creely disappeared in late 1872; subsequent attempts to locate him failed, and in 1900 he was declared legally dead.

A native of Philadelphia, Creely graduated from Central High School in 1858, studied law, attained admission to the bar in 1862, and practiced in Philadelphia. A supporter of the Union, Creely joined the Pennsylvania Militia for the American Civil War and advanced through the ranks to command the Pennsylvania Light Artillery Regiment's Keystone Battery as a captain, a position he held until his disappearance in 1872.

Creely was active in politics as a Republican, and served on the Philadelphia Common Council from 1867 to 1870. In 1870, he took advantage of a split between incumbent Republican U.S. Representative Charles O'Neill and Philadelphia's Republican Party leaders to run as an Independent Republican; he defeated O'Neill and served one term, 1871 to 1873. During most of his Congressional term, Creely claimed an extended illness prevented him from consistently performing his duties. After O'Neill reconciled with the Republican leadership in Philadelphia and planned to run for Congress in 1872, Creely announced his intention to run for reelection as a Liberal Republican.

In August 1872, Creely disappeared from Washington, D.C. Subsequent investigation revealed him to be in serious debt, and he was accused of theft and fraud. Attempts to locate him throughout the 1870s and 1880s proved unsuccessful. After his mother's 1897 death, Creely's surviving sister petitioned to have him declared legally dead, which was done in 1900. He was not married and had no children, so his sister inherited his estate, which consisted mostly of congressional pay he had never claimed.

== Early life ==
Creely was born in Philadelphia, Pennsylvania on November 14, 1839, the son of John S. Creely and Elmida (Vauclain) Creely. He was educated at Philadelphia's Locust Street School until 1854, and graduated from Central High School in 1858. He studied law in the Philadelphia office of attorney Charles E. Lex, attained admission to the bar in 1862, and practiced in Philadelphia.

== Start of career ==
Creely became active in politics as a Republican, including service as a member of the Union Republican City Executive Committee. He was also interested in boating, and in early 1872 was a founder of Philadelphia's Grimes Yacht Club. In the 1870s and 1880s, a schooner-rigged yacht named for Creely, the John V. Creely, carried cargo between Philadelphia and other ports, including Klein Curaçao, and took part in regattas.

=== Military career ===
In April 1861, Creely enlisted for the American Civil War when he joined the militia's Keystone Battery, Pennsylvania Light Artillery Regiment. He served throughout the war, including activation for federal service in 1864, and advanced through the ranks to become the battery first sergeant. Commissioned a first lieutenant in 1862, he later received promotion to captain as commander of the battery. Creely remained in the state militia as battery commander, and served until his commission expired in October 1872, following his disappearance.

== Political career ==
=== Philadelphia Common Council ===
Creely was a member of the Philadelphia Common Council from 1867 to 1870. As a council member, Creely was active on several standing committees, including Law, Defense and Protection, and Printing and Supplies. In addition, he took part in council activities outside of regular meetings, including service on the monthly visiting committee that oversaw Girard College.

In June 1869, Creely was president of the citywide Republican convention called to nominate a candidate for recorder of deeds. In September 1869, he was appointed to the common council committee that investigated a robbery that had taken place at the city Receiver of Taxes office.

=== U.S. House ===
Creely was elected to Congress in 1870 as an Independent Republican, taking advantage of a temporary rift between Republican incumbent Charles O'Neill and the leaders of Philadelphia's Republican organization. Creely served in the 42nd United States Congress (March 4, 1871 to March 3, 1873), but rarely carried out his congressional duties, and appeared only once in the Congressional Globe Index, a predecessor to the Congressional Record, in which he was recorded as taking part in the ceremonial roll call vote at the beginning of the term.

In March 1871, he was one of the Pennsylvania U.S. House members who signed a letter to President Ulysses S. Grant recommending John Weiss Forney for appointment as Collector of the Port of Philadelphia, which Forney subsequently received. On March 14, Creely participated in a procedural vote on prohibiting the collection of taxes and duties on imported coal; the motion failed, and as a supporter of Pennsylvania's coal industry, Creely was among the majority that voted no. On March 15, he voted on a measure that would have removed the political disabilities imposed on former Confederates by the Fourteenth Amendment to the United States Constitution. The measure failed, and as a support of the Union during the Civil War, Creely was in the majority who voted no.

During his term in the U.S. House, Creely was assigned to the Committee on Indian Affairs, but was not recorded as taking any part in its proceedings. His sparse attendance may have resulted from an extended illness; Pennsylvania newspapers reported in September 1871 that Creely had contracted Typhoid. He was feared to be near death, but began to recover in late 1871. In January 1872, the House voted on whether to end the collection of income taxes under the Revenue Act of 1864; Creely voted yes, but the measure failed. Creely did not receive his pay, which remained with the House Sergeant at Arms. From late 1872 to early 1874, Creely's name was one of several that appeared in newspaper advertisements as signers of a letter attesting to the benefits of Dr. Fitler's Rheumatic Syrup, a Philadelphia patent medicine. With O'Neill planning an 1872 candidacy after reconciling with the Philadelphia Republican leadership, in the summer of 1872 Creely indicated his intention to stand for reelection as a member of the Liberal Republican Party.

== Disappearance ==
According to court documents his sister Adelaide filed when she requested that he be declared legally dead, in July 1872 Creely departed Philadelphia for Washington to conduct legal business and prepare for the start of a congressional session in December. On July 6, Washington newspapers reported him to be at the Ebbitt House Hotel. In August, he wrote from Washington to inform his sister and mother that he was going to board a ship for New Orleans. He was not heard from again, and investigations by his family failed to determine his whereabouts or the cause of his disappearance.

In October 1872 Creely was sued for legal malpractice, accused of misappropriating a client's stock certificates and using them as security for a loan which he did not repay. He was subsequently accused of additional financial misdeeds, which could have played a part in his disappearance. After his disappearance was noticed, creditors attempted unsuccessfully to claim his Congressional pay, which continued to be held by the Sergeant at Arms.

Investigators found that his suitcases and other personal belongings were still in his Washington hotel room, making it unlikely that he had sailed to New Orleans. Despite this discovery, his mother and sister later searched for him in New Orleans, most major U.S. cities, and locations as far away as Europe, Asia, Africa, and South America, but found no trace. Contemporary news accounts from late 1872 indicated that Creely's debts totaled more than $20,000 ($469,000 in 2021). At least one family member, friend, or creditor attempted unsuccessfully to contact Creely in Louisiana, as shown by his name appearing in a February 1873 newspaper list of letters awaiting pickup at the New Orleans post office.

== Declared dead ==
Creely's mother died in 1897, after which Adelaide Creely informed the courts that extensive efforts to find Creely had been unsuccessful and applied to have him declared legally dead. On September 28, 1900 the orphans' court of Philadelphia made the declaration, and since he had no wife or children, his sister received his estate, consisting chiefly of the congressional pay Creely had never claimed.

In 1927, as the Joint Committee on Printing prepared to reprint the Biographical Directory of the United States Congress, one clerk went through extensive research to obtain more information about Creely's fate, including writing to men with whom he served during the Civil War. One response the clerk received stated, "He [Creely] was a splendid soldier, with a fine record and was honorably discharged at the end of his term of service . . . He went to Washington and that was the last time I, or any of his friends, ever heard of him. He never came back to Philadelphia, and disappeared utterly."

== Electoral history ==
=== Philadelphia Common Council ===
==== October 8, 1867 ====
- John V. Creely (Republican), 2,258 (28.3%)
- John Bardsley (Republican), 2,237 (28.0%)
- Dr. Nathaniel Ranck, (Democrat), 1,760 (22.1%)
- William Badger (Democrat), 1,724 (21.6%)

=== United States House of Representatives ===
==== October 11, 1870 ====
- John V. Creely (Independent Republican), 11,059 (52.2%)
- Charles O'Neill (Republican), 10,134 (47.8%)

== See also ==
- List of people who disappeared

== Notes ==
U.S. House of Representatives
Preceded by Charles O'Neill	Member of the U.S. House of Representatives from Pennsylvania's 2nd congressional district 1871–1873	Succeeded by Charles O'Neill
