= Henry Cianfrani =

American politician

Henry J. Cianfrani

Member of the Pennsylvania Senate from the 1st district
- In office January 2, 1967 – December 15, 1977
- Preceded by: Anthony J. DiSilvestro
- Succeeded by: Vince Fumo

Member of the Pennsylvania House of Representatives from the Philadelphia County district
- In office January 1, 1963 – November 30, 1966

Personal details
- Born: March 19, 1923 Philadelphia, Pennsylvania, U.S.
- Died: July 3, 2002 (aged 79) Philadelphia, Pennsylvania, U.S.
- Party: Democratic
- Spouse(s): Rita Ann Moreno, Laura Foreman
- Children: 4
- Occupation: State senator, lobbyist

Henry J. "Buddy" Cianfrani (March 19, 1923 – July 3, 2002) was the Pennsylvania state senator for the first district.

Prior to holding elective office, he served in the U.S. Army during World War II where he earned the Purple Heart and the Silver Star.

He was a delegate to the Democratic National Convention in 1956 and 1960. He was elected to the Pennsylvania House of Representatives in 1963, where he served until his election to the Pennsylvania State Senate in 1966. He eventually attained the chairmanship of the powerful Appropriations Committee from which position he worked closely with Speaker of the House Herbert Fineman to appropriate money to Philadelphia.

In 1977, Cianfrani was convicted on federal charges of racketeering and mail fraud for padding his Senate payroll. His case was prosecuted in the United States District Court for the Eastern District of Pennsylvania by U.S. Attorney David W. Marston, who was later removed from the position by U.S. President Jimmy Carter. Cianfrani was sentenced to five years in federal prison. After serving for twenty-seven months, he was released in 1980.

In the middle 1970s, he began dating political reporter Laura Foreman of The Philadelphia Inquirer. The two moved in together and she reportedly accepted money and gifts from him while she was still reporting on him for her newspaper. After the affair became public in 1977 she was fired by her new employer, The New York Times. She and Cianfrani married in 1980 after his divorce from his first wife was finalized and he was released from federal prison.

Years after his release, his political career enjoyed a resurgence. In 1988 Cianfrani won back his old position as Philadelphia ward leader and regained a measure of clout within Philadelphia politics. He was considered a mentor to many Philadelphia politicians, including Congressman Bob Brady and Senator Vince Fumo.

Cianfrani died of a stroke in Hahnemann University Hospital in Philadelphia, Pennsylvania, on July 3, 2002.
