= Anthony J. DiSilvestro =

American politician (1904–1969)

President pro tempore of the Pennsylvania Senate
- In office January 3, 1961 – 1962
- Preceded by: Weldon Brinton Heyburn
- Succeeded by: M. Harvey Taylor

Pennsylvania State Senator from the 1st District
- In office 1937–1966
- Preceded by: Joseph C. Trainer
- Succeeded by: Henry Cianfrani

Personal details
- Born: May 15, 1904 Philadelphia, Pennsylvania
- Died: May 3, 1969 (aged 64) Philadelphia, Pennsylvania
- Party: Democratic
- Education: Temple University
- Occupation: Politician, pharmacist, lawyer

Anthony J. DiSilvestro (May 15, 1904 – May 3, 1969) was an American pharmacist, lawyer, and politician who served in the Pennsylvania State Senate from 1937 to 1966, including two years as president pro tempore from January 1961 through 1962. DiSilvestro was a Democrat and Temple University alumnus with deep roots in the Philadelphia Italian-American community.

== Life and career ==
Born in Philadelphia to parents Giuseppe and Mary Calfano DiSilvestro, DiSilvestro attended local public schools and received degrees from Temple University School of Pharmacy in 1928 and Temple University School of Law in 1943. He owned a Philadelphia pharmacy for forty-five years and edited and published a Philadelphia-based Italian-American weekly.

The first Democrat to serve in Philadelphia's First Senatorial District since 1856, DiSilvestro went on to serve as a state senator for thirty years and as president pro tempore for two years. In 1961–62, his leadership saw enactment of the Pennsylvania Fair Employment Practices Act, the Fair Educational Opportunities Act, and the Wage Payment and Collection Act. He also backed legislation advancing conservation, clean food, fair labor practices, education, highway construction, and penal code reform.

In 1966, DiSilvestro lost his party's endorsement to Henry Cianfrani and withdrew from that year's election. He died in Philadelphia in 1969. He was married to teacher and pharmacist Mary Angela Perseo.
