= Mitchell Rubin =

American businessman and politician from Pennsylvania

- Occupations: Pennsylvania Turnpike Commission, chair CGR Gaming Associates, Principal B&R Services for Professionals, Principal
- Known for: and founder of the National Association of Professional Process Servers
- Spouse: Ruth Arnao

Mitchell Rubin is an American businessman and politician from Pennsylvania. He is a former chair of the Pennsylvania Turnpike Commission.

== Life ==
He was named to the Pennsylvania Turnpike Commission in 1998. He was elected chair of the Turnpike Commission in 2003.

In 2006, Rubin's firm, CGR Gaming Associates, received a slot machine suppliers and distributor license from the Pennsylvania Gaming Control Board. This action was criticized by members of the Pennsylvania Senate, with Senate Majority Whip Jeff Piccola saying "Mr. Rubin's position as a public official certainly raises a lot of questions." Other senators expressed concerns that Rubin's wife, Ruth Arnao, is a former staff member for State Senator Vince Fumo, who wrote the slots legislation. At the time Rubin's firm received the license, both Arnao and Rubin were under a federal corruption investigation by the Philadelphia-based United States Attorney.

In filings submitted by the United States Attorney during Vince Fumo's corruption trial, Rubin was named as one of Fumo's "ghost employees," saying that he was paid $30,000 annually for five years in exchange for no work. Moments after Arnao and Fumo's conviction on all 139 counts, an FBI agent handed a Rubin a target letter informing him that he was under investigation and that "substantial evidence" was present that linked him to a federal crime. Rubin then took an unpaid leave from the Turnpike Commission while Ed Rendell reviewed trial transcripts. The next day, Rendell fired Rubin from the Turnpike Commission, saying that "It is inappropriate for you to remain as a commissioner." Rubin was found guilty of a misdemeanor charge of commercial bribery and sentenced to 24 months probation, 100 hours of community service and fined.
