= Henry Messinger =

American politician

Henry C. Messinger

Democratic Leader of the Pennsylvania Senate
- In office September 1, 1977 – November 30, 1978
- Preceded by: Thomas Nolan
- Succeeded by: Edward Zemprelli

Member of the Pennsylvania Senate from the 16th district
- In office January 5, 1971 – November 30, 1982
- Preceded by: John Van Sant
- Succeeded by: Guy Kratzer

Personal details
- Born: May 30, 1915 South Allentown, Pennsylvania
- Died: May 13, 1991 (aged 75)

Henry Messinger (May 30, 1915 – May 13, 1991) was an American politician from Pennsylvania who served as a Democratic member of the Pennsylvania State Senate for the 16th district from 1971 to 1982.

He was born in Allentown, Pennsylvania.

He served as majority whip in the Pennsylvania Senate from 1974 to 1980.
