= 2015 Bridgeport, Connecticut, Democratic mayoral primary =

Bridgeport, Connecticut Democratic Party primary, 2015
- September 16, 2015

The 2015 Democratic Party primary for Bridgeport, Connecticut was held on September 16, and was held with the intention of choosing the party's candidate for mayor. The primary enjoyed unusually extensive coverage due to the participation of Joseph P. Ganim, a former mayor of the city and convicted felon. The other candidates were incumbent mayor Bill Finch and Mary-Jane Foster.

== Candidates ==
=== Joe Ganim ===
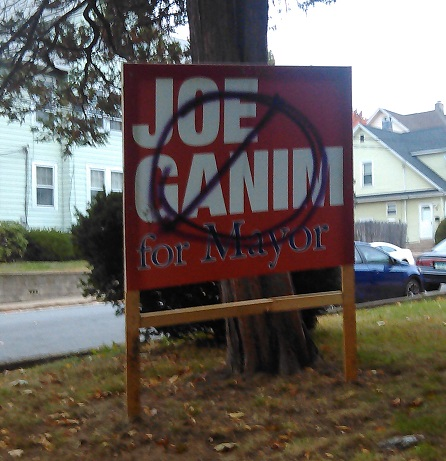
A vandalized lawn sign for Joe Ganim.

Joe Ganim had been mayor of Bridgeport from 1991 until 2003, when he was convicted of a number of corruption-related charges and sentenced to nine years in prison. Both Finch and Foster heavily criticized him for his past behavior and alleged lack of repentance. Even so, Ganim made repentance a major theme of his candidacy, and he used his law enforcement endorsements to reassure voters that he had reformed. Ganim also conducted a voter registration drive, targeting former felons whose paroles had ended. Ganim was compared to Washington, D.C. mayor Marion Barry and Providence mayor Buddy Cianci throughout the campaign because they had also regained political office after criminal convictions.

Members of Connecticut's Democratic party outside of Bridgeport were also critical of Ganim. Lowell Weicker called the prospect of a new Ganim administration "repugnant", and governor Dan Malloy, who endorsed Finch, refused to switch his endorsement to Ganim even after winning the party's nomination, saying "I have not endorsed the Democratic candidate, and I'm a Democrat. I guess there's a message there." The Connecticut Post, in its endorsement of Finch, commented that one Ganim administration was "more than enough."

== Endorsements ==
Mayor Finch secured the endorsement of all of the major city unions except for the policeman's union, which endorsed Ganim, as did a member of the FBI team which originally arrested him for corruption. Finch was also endorsed by Dan Malloy, the current governor of Connecticut, former mayors of Bridgeport John Fabrizi, Tom Bucci and Leonard Paoletta, senators Dick Blumenthal and Chris Murphy, and congressman Jim Himes. Foster was endorsed by Lowell P. Weicker, a former US senator and governor of Connecticut.

== Results ==
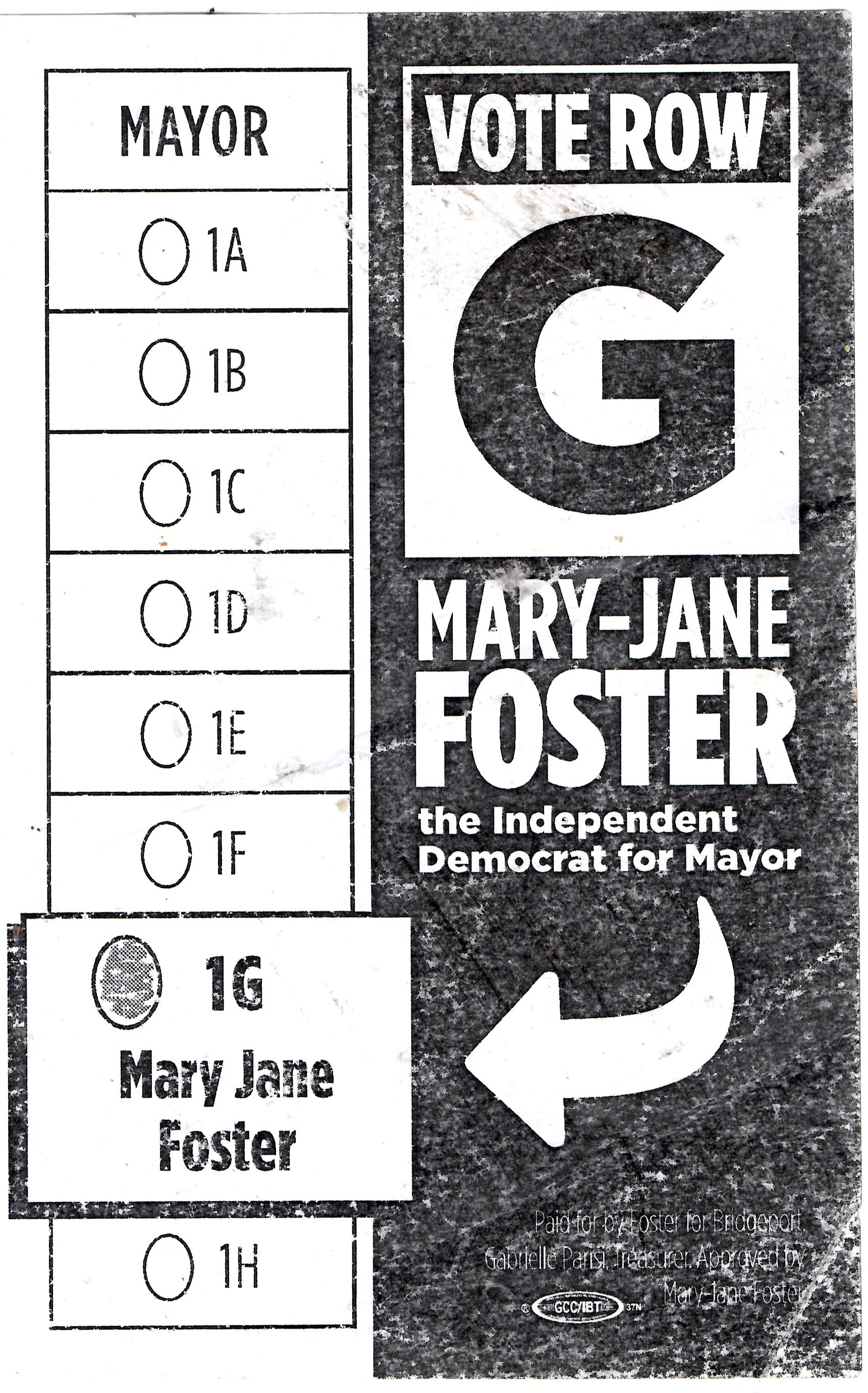
A campaign flyer distributed near a voting station during the general election encouraging voters to vote for Mary-Jane Foster

Bridgeport Democratic primary mayoral election, 2015
| Party | Candidate | Votes | % | ±% |
|---|---|---|---|---|
| Democratic | Joseph P. Ganim | 6,264 | 47.1 | |
| Democratic | Bill Finch | 5,859 | 44.05 | |
| Democratic | Mary-Jane Foster | 1,177 | 8.85 | |

== Subsequent events ==
After his loss in the primary, Bill Finch attempted to run as the nominee of the Jobs Creation Party, a vehicle that was "widely seen" to have been created for him in case of a loss in the Democratic primary, but was unable to do so due to a nomination deadline set by state law.

=== Democratic reactions ===
Following Ganim's victory in the general election, governor Malloy made a congratulatory phone call to Ganim and pledged not to punish Bridgeport by refusing to cooperate with his administration.
