= Larry Farnese =

American politician from Pennsylvania

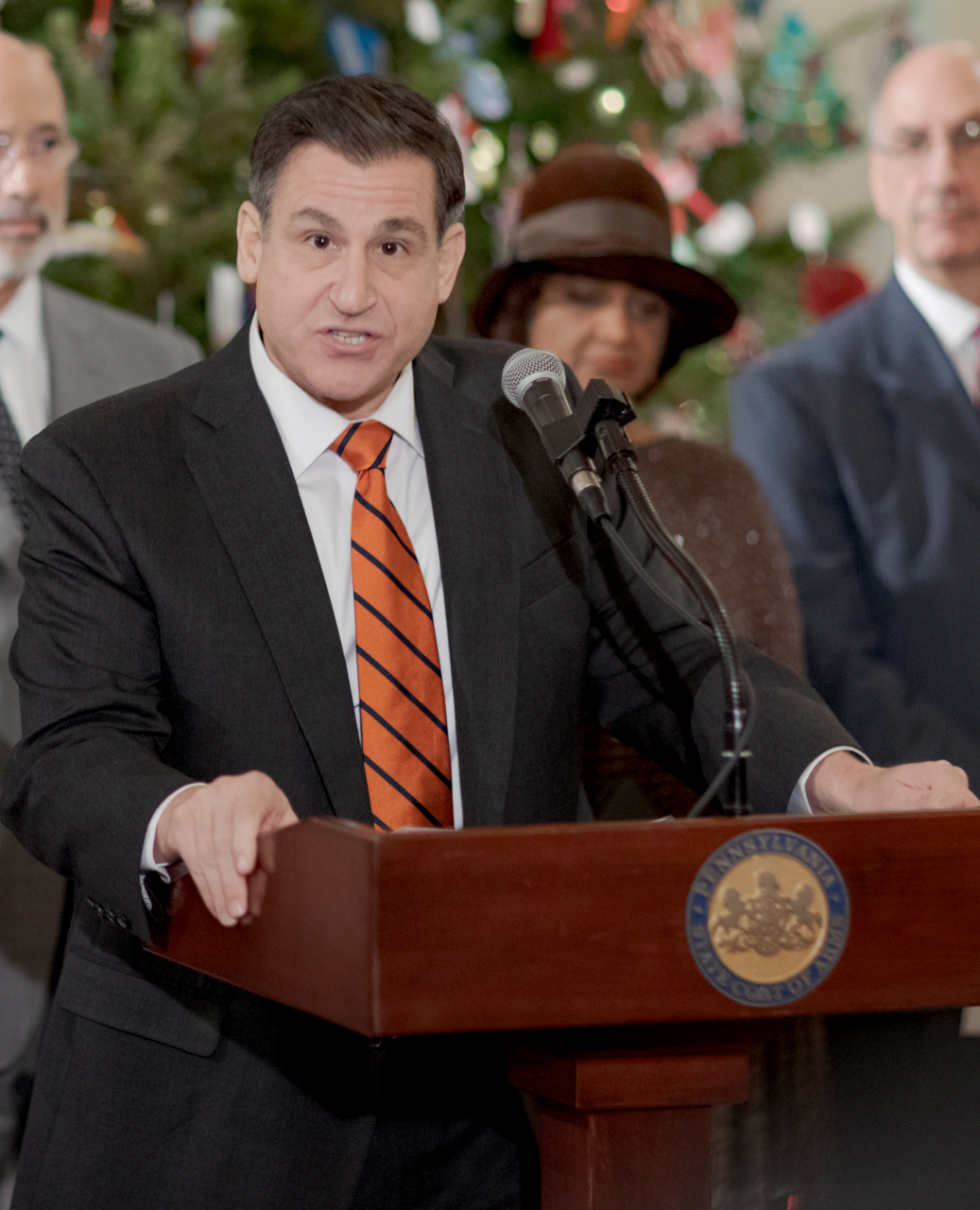

Member of the Pennsylvania Senate from the 1st district
- In office January 6, 2009 – November 30, 2020
- Preceded by: Vince Fumo
- Succeeded by: Nikil Saval

Personal details
- Born: June 1, 1968 (age 58) Drexel Hill, Pennsylvania
- Party: Democratic
- Education: Villanova University (BA); Temple University (JD)
- Occupation: Attorney

Lawrence M. Farnese Jr. (born June 1, 1968) is an American attorney and politician. He was a Democratic member of the Pennsylvania Senate where he represented the 1st District from 2009 until November 30, 2020. Farnese was the Democratic ward leader of the 8th ward in Philadelphia.

== Early life and education ==
Farnese was born in Drexel Hill, Pennsylvania. His grandfather, Andrew M. Farnese, served as president of the Philadelphia Board of Education and chairman of the Philadelphia Gas Commission. After graduating from Malvern Preparatory School, he attended Villanova University, where he earned a Bachelor of Arts degree in political science in 1990. He received a Juris Doctor from Temple University School of Law in 1994, and was admitted to the bar in Pennsylvania (1999) and New Jersey (1994).

=== Politics ===
In 2006, Farnese challenged 10-term incumbent Babette Josephs in the Democratic primary for the 182nd District in the State House. He was narrowly defeated, losing by a margin of 237 votes.

In 2008, following the retirement of embattled incumbent Vince Fumo, Farnese ran for the Pennsylvania Senate in the 1st District. In the Democratic primary, he faced union leader Johnny Dougherty and community activist Anne Dicker; he ultimately won the election with 43%, receiving 30,879 votes. In the general election, he easily defeated Republican businessman Jack Morley with 81% of the vote.

Farnese was indicted in 2016 by the federal government for allegedly buying the vote of a committeewoman to keep his seat as the Democratic Ward Leader for Philadelphia's Eighth Ward. The indictment was taken to trial in January 2017, with allegations that Farnese paid $6,000 in campaign funds towards the education of committee person Ellen Chapman's daughter to secure her vote, and thus his seat as Ward Leader. Farnese and his legal team denied the charges against him in court, asserting that what the government describes as a clear case of bribery is within the realm of state campaign finance laws. On February 1, 2017 Farnese was acquitted of all thirteen charges against him. Farnese made a bid for re-election in 2020, but was defeated by a member of the Democratic Socialists of America, journalist Nikil Saval.

In 2023, Farnese briefly ran for election to the Philadelphia Court of Common Pleas, before suspending his campaign.

== See also ==
- Vince Fumo
- Nikil Saval
- Vincent Hughes
- Jay Costa
