= Guy Kratzer =

American politician

Guy M. Kratzer

Member of the Pennsylvania Senate from the 16th district
- In office January 4, 1983 – November 30, 1986
- Preceded by: Henry Messinger
- Succeeded by: Roy Afflerbach

Personal details
- Born: March 10, 1941 Pottsville, Pennsylvania, U.S.
- Died: September 30, 2013 (aged 72) Allentown, Pennsylvania, U.S.

Guy M. Kratzer (March 10, 1941 – September 30, 2013) was an American politician from Pennsylvania who served as a Republican member of the Pennsylvania State Senate for the 16th district from 1983 to 1986.

== Early life and education ==
Kratzer was born in Pottsville, Pennsylvania to Guy and Kathryn Miller Kratzer. He graduated from William Allen High School in Allentown, Pennsylvania in 1959. He received a B.S. from Muhlenberg College in Allentown in 1963, a B.D. from Evangelical School of Theology in Myerstown, Pennsylvania in 1967, a ThM from Princeton Theological Seminary in Princeton, New Jersey in 1968, and a M.A. from Temple University in Philadelphia in 1973.

== Career ==
Kratzer served as a Republican member of the Pennsylvania State Senate for the 16th district from 1983 to 1986. In 1984, he crashed his car in Harrisburg, Pennsylvania and was arrested for driving under the influence.

== Death ==
On September 30, 2013, Kratzer died in Allentown, Pennsylvania, at age 72.
