= Peter Camiel =

American politician (1910–1991)

Peter J. Camiel

Chairman of the Philadelphia Democratic City Committee
- In office December 26, 1969 – June 30, 1976
- Preceded by: Bill Green
- Succeeded by: Martin Weinberg

Member of the Pennsylvania Senate from the 3rd district
- In office January 6, 1953 – November 30, 1964
- Preceded by: John Meade
- Succeeded by: Louis Johanson
- Constituency: Parts of Philadelphia

Member of the Pennsylvania Turnpike Commission
- In office 1975–1991
- Succeeded by: Bob Brady

Personal details
- Born: January 30, 1910 Philadelphia, Pennsylvania, US
- Died: January 31, 1991 (aged 81) Valley Forge, Pennsylvania, US
- Party: Democratic

Peter J. Camiel (January 30, 1910 – January 31, 1991) was an American politician from Pennsylvania who served as a Democratic member of the Pennsylvania State Senate for the 3rd district from 1953 to 1964.

== Career ==
Camiel started his political career as a ward leader in Philadelphia. He became a millionaire running a wholesale beer distribution business.

He served as Chairman of the Philadelphia Democratic Party from 1969 to 1976, when he lost a power struggle with Mayor Frank Rizzo. Camiel had helped get Rizzo elected in 1971 but they became bitter rivals.

Camiel became leader of the 5th ward in Philadelphia, known as Center City, and served in that capacity for over 40 years.

Camiel was nominated to the Pennsylvania Turnpike Commission by Governor Milton Shapp in 1975. In 1980, he and three other defendants, including Vince Fumo and Thomas Nolan, were convicted of placing "ghost workers" on state payroll. The charges were thrown out in August 1981. He was suspended from the Turnpike Commission as a result of the indictment but returned in December 1981. He was renominated for a four-year term by Governor Bob Casey Sr. in 1987. He served on the commission until his death in 1991.

Peter J Camiel died of lung cancer on January 31, 1991, at Valley Forge, Pennsylvania.

== Legacy ==
A rest area on the Pennsylvania Turnpike is named in his honor.
