= Joseph G. Brimmeier =

American politician

CEO of the Pennsylvania Turnpike Commission
- In office February 4, 2003 – March 15, 2011
- Preceded by: John T. Durbin
- Succeeded by: Roger Nutt

Personal details
- Born: April 1, 1948 (age 78) Northside, Pittsburgh
- Party: Democratic Party
- Education: Youngstown State University

Joseph G. Brimmeier is the former chief executive officer of the Pennsylvania Turnpike Commission.

Brimmeier attended Pittsburgh's North Catholic High School. He also earned a degree in health and physical education and a master's degree in counseling-administration of higher education at Youngstown State University.

He worked for various departments of the Allegheny County, Pennsylvania government, including the Allegheny County Industrial Development Authority, Community College of Allegheny County, Allegheny County Parks Department, Allegheny County Department of Development, for 20 years.

In 1991 he had a "falling out" with former County Commissioner Tom Foerster after Brimmeier ran unsuccessfully for county prothonotary against Foerster's wishes.

Brimmeier then served as Chief of Staff for former Congressman Ron Klink for 8 years and ran Klink's unsuccessful race against Senator Rick Santorum in 2000.

Brimmeier, who was a campaign confidant for Pennsylvania Governor Ed Rendell's successful 2002 race for governor, was appointed CEO of the Turnpike Commission on February 4, 2003. In 2010, Politics Magazine named him one of the most influential Democrats in Pennsylvania.

== Corruption Conviction ==
On November 20, 2014, Brimmeier pleaded guilty to felony conflict of interest charges.
