= Charles O'Neill (Pennsylvania politician) =

American politician (1821-1893)

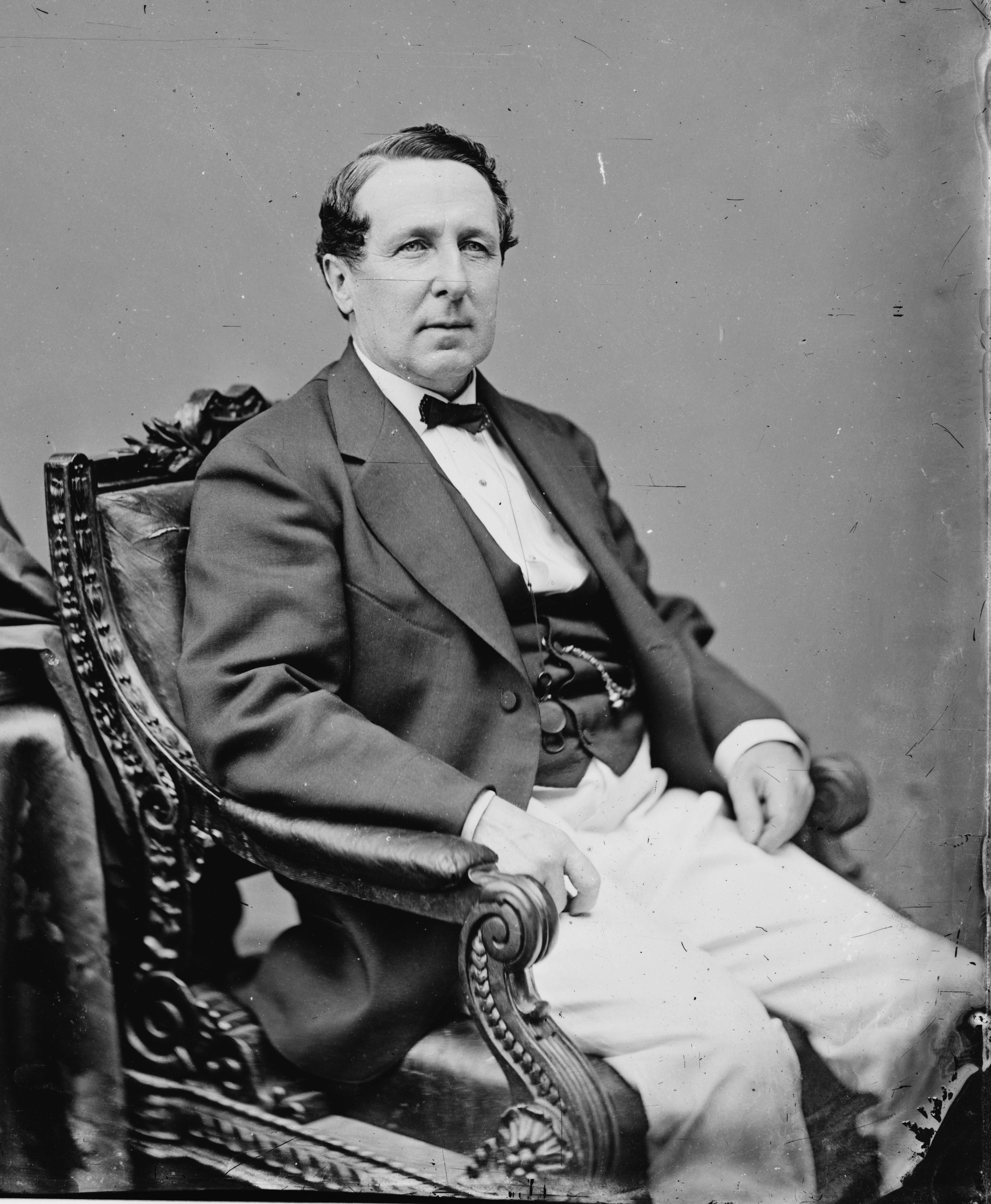

Member of the U.S. House of Representatives from Pennsylvania's 2nd district
- In office March 4, 1873 – November 25, 1893
- Preceded by: John V. Creely
- Succeeded by: Robert Adams, Jr.
- In office March 4, 1863 – March 3, 1871
- Preceded by: Charles J. Biddle
- Succeeded by: John V. Creely

Member of the Pennsylvania House of Representatives
- In office 1860–1861
- Constituency: Philadelphia, Pennsylvania

Member of the Pennsylvania Senate from the 1st district
- In office 1853–1854
- Preceded by: Benjamin Matthias
- Succeeded by: Eli Kirk Price

Member of the Pennsylvania House of Representatives
- In office 1850–1852

Personal details
- Born: March 21, 1821 Philadelphia, Pennsylvania, U.S.
- Died: November 25, 1893 (aged 72) Philadelphia, Pennsylvania, U.S.
- Resting place: West Laurel Hill Cemetery, Bala Cynwyd, Pennsylvania, U.S.
- Party: Whig, Republican
- Occupation: Politician

Charles O'Neill (March 21, 1821 – November 25, 1893) was an American politician who served as a Republican member of the U.S. House of Representatives for Pennsylvania's 2nd congressional district from 1863 to 1871 and from 1873 to 1893.

He served as a Whig member of the Pennsylvania House of Representatives from 1850 to 1852 and from 1860 to 1861. He served as a member of the Pennsylvania State Senate for the 1st district from 1853 to 1854.

== Early life and education ==
O'Neill was born March 21, 1821, in Philadelphia, Pennsylvania. He attended a Quaker preparatory school and graduated from Dickinson College in Carlisle, Pennsylvania, in 1840. He studied law under the future Vice-President of the United States, George M. Dallas and was admitted to the Philadelphia bar in 1843.

== Career ==
He worked as an attorney at law in Philadelphia from 1843 to 1893.

He was elected as a Whig to the Pennsylvania House of Representatives and served from 1850 to 1852 and as a Republican from 1860 to 1861. He was elected to the Pennsylvania State Senate for the 1st district and served from 1853 to 1854. He was elected as a Whig in 1853 to the Pennsylvania State Senate.

In 1862, he was elected as a Republican to the 38th and to the three succeeding Congresses. He was an unsuccessful candidate for reelection in 1870 losing to John V. Creely. He was again elected to the 43rd Congress and served from 1873 until his death in 1893.

He died November 25, 1893, of tuberculosis in Philadelphia and was interred at West Laurel Hill Cemetery in Bala Cynwyd, Pennsylvania.

== See also ==
- List of members of the United States Congress who died in office (1790–1899)

Pennsylvania House of Representatives
Preceded by	Member of the Pennsylvania House of Representatives, Philadelphia; 1850–1852	Succeeded by
Preceded by	Member of the Pennsylvania House of Representatives, Philadelphia; 1860–1861	Succeeded by
Pennsylvania State Senate
Preceded by Benjamin Matthias	Member of the Pennsylvania Senate, 1st district 1853-1854	Succeeded by Eli Kirk Price
U.S. House of Representatives
Preceded by Charles J. Biddle	Member of the U.S. House of Representatives from Pennsylvania's 2nd congressional district 1863–1871	Succeeded by John V. Creely
Preceded by John V. Creely	Member of the U.S. House of Representatives from Pennsylvania's 2nd congressional district 1873–1893	Succeeded by Robert Adams, Jr.
