= Eli Kirk Price II =

American lawyer

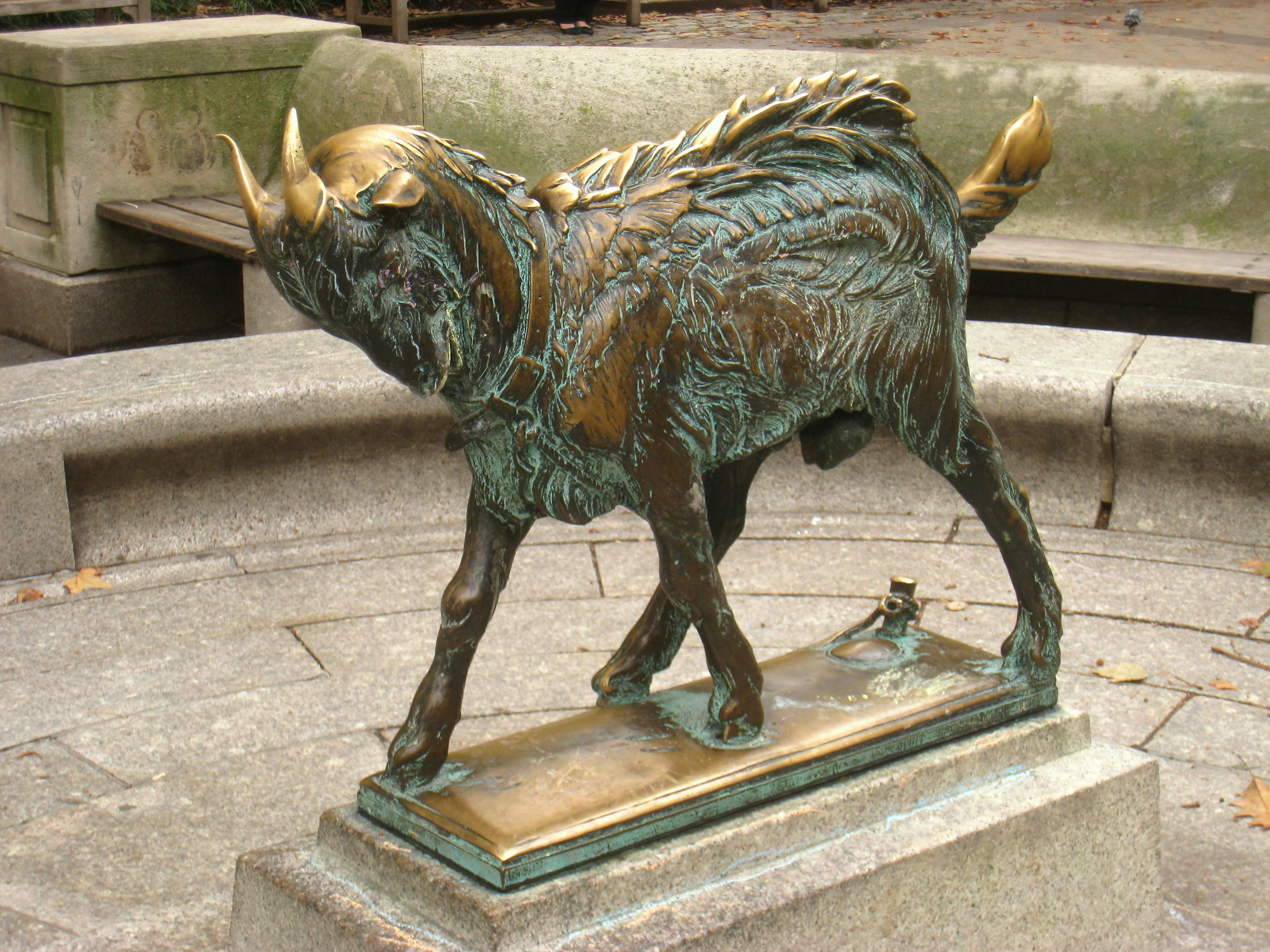
Billy (1914) by Albert Laessle, Rittenhouse Square, Philadelphia

Eli Kirk Price II (1860 – January 24, 1933) was a prominent American Philadelphia lawyer, called "the foremost civic and cultural leader in early twentieth-century Philadelphia". He was the commissioner of Fairmount Park during the planning and development of the Benjamin Franklin Parkway, of which he was one of the principal planners. Later, he was instrumental in obtaining funding for the new Philadelphia Museum of Art building and was President of the museum from 1926 to 1933.

He was the grandson of Eli Kirk Price. He received his Bachelor of Arts and Bachelor of Laws degrees from the University of Pennsylvania respectively in 1881 and 1883, and was admitted to the Pennsylvania bar in 1883.

Price was elected to the Board of Trustees of the Fairmount Park Art Association in Philadelphia (now the Association for Public Art) in 1914 and served as the organization's Vice President from 1925 until his death in 1933. Price was responsible for the purchase and installation of the sculpture of Albert Laessle "Billy" goat sculpture in Rittenhouse Square. He died in 1933 of a heart attack. The Price Fountain in Eakins Oval is dedicated to his memory.

He is buried in Woodlands Cemetery, Philadelphia.
