= Eli Kirk Price =

American politician (1797–1884)

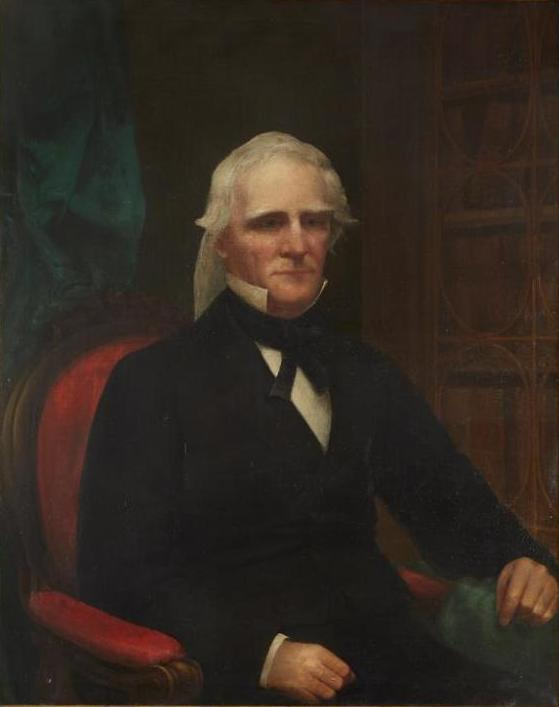

Member of the Pennsylvania Senate from the 1st district
- In office 1853–1855
- Preceded by: Charles O'Neill
- Succeeded by: Harlan G. Ingram

Personal details
- Born: July 20, 1797 East Bradford Township, Pennsylvania, US
- Died: November 14, 1884 (aged 87)
- Party: Whig
- Occupation: lawyer

Eli Kirk Price (July 20, 1797 – November 14, 1884) was an American lawyer and politician from Philadelphia, Pennsylvania. He served as a Whig member of the Pennsylvania State Senate for the 1st district from 1853 to 1855, as commissioner of Fairmount Park from the time of its founding, and as a member of the American Philosophical Society.

== Early life and education ==
Price was born in East Bradford Township, Pennsylvania to Philip and Rachel Price. His ancestor, Philip, was a Welsh Quaker who came to the Pennsylvania Colony with William Penn. He initially trained as a merchant before studying law in the office of John Sergeant. He was admitted to the bar in 1822 and specialized in real estate.

== Career ==
He was elected to the Pennsylvania State Senate for the 1st district as a Whig and served from 1853 to 1855. He worked to secure the consolidation of the city and county of Philadelphia into one metropolitan unit. The Consolidation Act of 1854 passed in February 1854 and tripled the size of Philadelphia, making it the largest territorial city in the United States. Price quit his Senate office at the end of the term.

Price supported other reform efforts, helping to rewrite Pennsylvania's real estate laws, strengthen married women's rights to property, establish a building inspectorate in Philadelphia, and secure the real estate for Fairmount Park.

He was an active member of the American Philosophical Society and a constant contributor to its "Transactions," a member of several foreign scientific and literary societies, president of the University hospital, of the Preston retreat, of the Pennsylvania Colonization Society, and of the Numismatic & Antiquarian Society of Philadelphia, a vice-president of the American Philosophical Society, and a trustee of the University of Pennsylvania. He published "Of the Law of Limitations and Liens against Real Estate in Pennsylvania" (Philadelphia, 1857); several treatises that were contributed to the American Philosophical Society; and the memorial volumes "Philip and Rachel Price" (printed privately, 1852); "Rebecca" (1862); and the "Centennial Meeting of the Descendants of Philip and Rachel Price" (1864).

Price was for a time an active member of the Pennsylvania Colonization Society. In 1860, he supported John Bell's Constitutional Union Party in the presidential election.

== Personal life ==
Price was married to Anna Embree in June 1818.

He was the grandfather of Eli Kirk Price II, another noted Philadelphia citizen.

== Legacy ==
The Eli Kirk Price fountain at Eakins Oval in Philadelphia is named in his honor.

== Notes ==
Pennsylvania State Senate
Preceded by Charles O'Neill	Member of the Pennsylvania Senate, 1st district 1853-1855	Succeeded by Harlan G. Ingram
