= Nikil Saval =

American politician

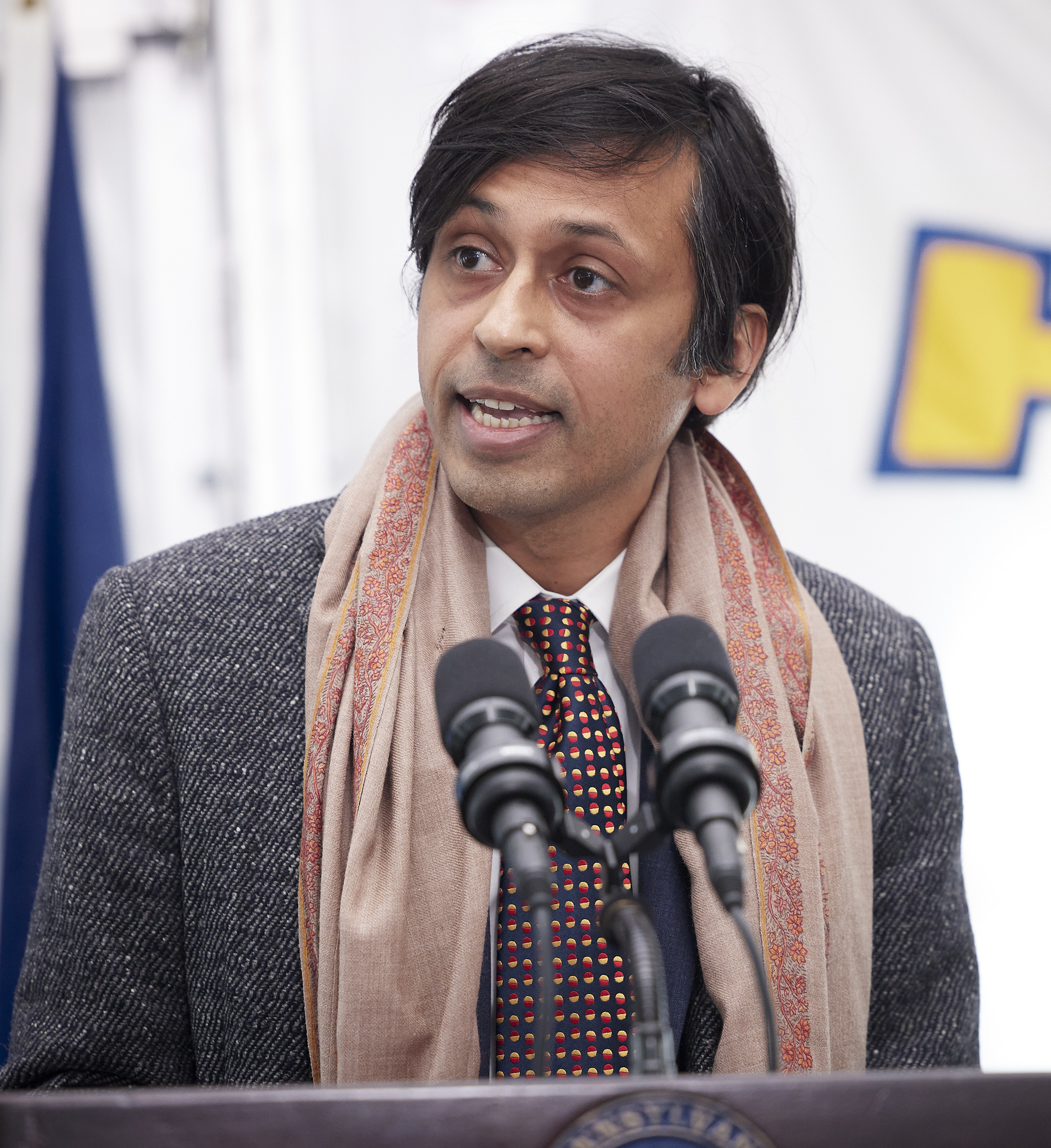
- Saval in 2022

Member of the Pennsylvania Senate from the 1st district
- Incumbent
- Assumed office January 5, 2021
- Preceded by: Larry Farnese

Personal details
- Born: December 27, 1982 (age 43) Los Angeles, California, U.S.
- Party: Democratic
- Other political affiliations: Democratic Socialists of America (Note: Democratic Socialists of America (DSA) is not a registered political party. Instead, it is a political organization for those with democratic socialist ideologies. Saval is a member of DSA, and he is endorsed by the Philadelphia DSA chapter.)
- Spouse: Shannon Garrison
- Children: 2
- Education: Columbia University (BA); Stanford University (PhD)
- Known for: Co-editor of n+1

Nikil Saval (born December 27, 1982) is an American writer, editor, journalist, organizer, and politician who has served since 2021 as a member of the Pennsylvania State Senate from the 1st district, representing most of South Philadelphia, all of Center City, much of the Riverwards, and parts of Southwest Philadelphia. A member of the Democratic Party and the Democratic Socialists of America, he is the first Asian American elected to the Pennsylvania State Senate, as well as the current Chair of the State Senate’s Philadelphia Delegation and Democratic Chair of the State Senate’s Urban Affairs & Housing Committee.

== Early life and education ==
Nikil Saval was born in Los Angeles, California, to parents who had emigrated from South India in 1970 to New Mexico, before later moving to Los Angeles. His father is from a village about 70 miles west of Bangalore and holds a Ph.D. in biochemistry. His mother is from Bangalore and completed a master’s degree in microbiology in New Mexico. Nikil has a brother, who is an academic.

Saval grew up in West Los Angeles. In 1982, the year Saval was born, his parents opened a Numero Uno pizza franchise in Santa Monica. The restaurant’s workforce consisted of many immigrants, especially those from El Salvador, and his parents helped some undocumented employees secure legal status. Growing up in and around the shop, Saval was exposed early to both the opportunities and barriers faced by working-class immigrants. This experience, combined with his parents' own immigrant backgrounds, had impressed upon him, he later reflected, "the importance of solidarity among peoples".

Saval attended public school in Los Angeles through eighth grade, when he received a scholarship for minority students from the non-profit organization A Better Chance to attend a local college-preparatory private school. Saval graduated from Harvard-Westlake in 2001, where he served on student council.

He graduated from Columbia College of Columbia University with a B.A. in English Literature in 2005 and received a Ph.D. in English Literature from Stanford University in 2014.

== Writing career ==
Saval was a co-editor-in-chief of n+1 from 2014 to 2019, as well as a contributor to The New York Times and The New Yorker, covering architecture and design. As of May 2025, he is an emeritus board member and contributing editor for n+1.

In his 2014 book Cubed: A Secret History of the Workplace, Saval traces the evolution of the office workplace, from 19th-century counting houses to modern cubicles, exploring how these workplaces—and the lives of the workers within them—can be improved. The book was named a New York Times notable book of 2014.

Saval's sophomore effort, Rage in Harlem: June Jordan and Architecture, was released in 2024, exploring the collaboration between writer and activist June Jordan and architect and inventor R. Buckminster Fuller to re-conceptualize Harlem following the Harlem race riot of 1964, focusing on Jordan's "Skyrise for Harlem" proposal. The proposal featured the construction of fifteen 100-story conical skyscrapers housing 500,000 people. The work originated from a talk Saval delivered at the Harvard Graduate School of Design and was co-published with the institution and Sternberg Press.

Saval is currently working on a book entitled Everything is Architecture, an analysis of the politics of industrial design.

== Political career ==
=== Activism ===
Saval was a co-founder of Reclaim Philadelphia, an organization that formed out of the Bernie Sanders 2016 presidential campaign. His group helped elect Larry Krasner to district attorney of Philadelphia. In 2018, Saval became the Ward Leader of Philadelphia's 2nd Ward.

=== Pennsylvania State Senate ===
In 2020, he challenged Democratic incumbent Larry Farnese for his seat in the Pennsylvania State Senate, earning the endorsement of Senator Bernie Sanders in May 2020. Saval based his campaign around a Green New Deal, prison reform, guaranteed affordable housing, redevelopment of Philadelphia schools, and Medicare for All. He beat Farnese in the primary and became de facto State Senator-elect, as he had no opposition in the general election.

He became a member of the Democratic Socialists of America in 2014. He has historically been a member of the Democratic Socialists of America and is currently a member, as of June 2025.

In 2022, Saval introduced the Whole-Home Repairs Act, legislation which aims to provide eligible residents with grants of up to $50,000 to make health-and-safety focused home repairs. Small landlords would also be eligible to apply for similar loans under the same program, and the state government would also invest in training qualified home-repair workers. This program is partly intended to help low-income residents become eligible for federal grants from the Weatherization Assistance Program (WAP), which subsidizes energy-efficiency upgrades for poorer residents. Despite Saval himself’s position on the left wing of the Democratic party, Saval’s bill has received signals of support from several Republican committee chairs.

In 2024, Saval supported a legislative proposal to increase housing supply in Pennsylvania by reducing onerous zoning regulations that restrict housing. The bill would permit duplexes in small towns and fourplexes in mid-sized towns previously zoned exclusively for single-family housing, as well as permit accessory dwelling units in all areas zoned for single-family housing.

For the 2025-2026 Session, Saval serves on the following committees in the State Senate:

- Urban Affairs & Housing (Minority Chair)
- Environmental Resources & Energy
- Judiciary
- State Government
- Transportation

Saval is also the current Chair of the State Senate’s Philadelphia Delegation.

== Personal life ==
Saval is married to Shannon Garrison. The couple lives in Philadelphia with their sons.

== Books ==
- Cubed: A Secret History of the Workplace (2014), ISBN 9780385536578
- Rage in Harlem: June Jordan and Architecture (2024), Sternberg Press / Harvard University Graduate School of Design, ISBN 9783956796296
