= John Van Sant =

American politician

John T. Van Sant

Member of the Pennsylvania Senate from the 16th district
- In office January 3, 1955 – November 30, 1970
- Preceded by: Tilghman Freed
- Succeeded by: Henry Messinger

Member of the Pennsylvania House of Representatives from the Lehigh County district
- In office 1951–1954

Personal details
- Born: November 2, 1915 Delano, Pennsylvania, US
- Died: October 3, 1972 (aged 56)

John T. Van Sant (November 2, 1915 – October 3, 1972) was an American politician from Pennsylvania who served as a Republican member of the Pennsylvania State Senate for the 16th district from 1955 to 1970. He also served in the Pennsylvania House of Representatives for the Lehigh County district from 1951 to 1954.

== Biography ==
Van Sant was born in Delano, Pennsylvania, on November 2, 1915, and graduated from Hazleton High School. He attended Westminster College in Fulton, Missouri and Muhlenberg College. He worked as a radio announcer on WRAK (AM) and as the sports and news director for WSAN radio in Allentown, Pennsylvania.

He served in the U.S. Navy during World War II in Hawaii and Guam.

Van Sant died on October 3, 1972.
