= Penguin Pete =

Sports mascot

Penguin Pete was the Pittsburgh Penguins’ first mascot. He was an Ecuadorian-born Humboldt penguin on loan from the Pittsburgh Zoo. Penguins officials even had special ice skates made for Pete by CCM in Canada. A skater from the University of Pittsburgh taught Pete at the arena how to ice skate.

Pete made his first appearance during the second intermission of a game against the Philadelphia Flyers on February 21, 1968. Pete made six more appearances. His last appearance was on November 16 of the same year during a game against the New York Rangers, as he died of pneumonia the following week. It is believed that his death was due to the ice crew at the Civic Arena keeping his nesting area too warm.

After his death, Pete was sent to an area taxidermist. He was later displayed in the lobby of the Penguins team offices at the arena. However, the stuffed Pete was later removed from the lobby after a few concerned callers objected to its presence there, according to then-Penguins owner Jack McGregor.

A second penguin mascot, dubbed "Re-Pete'", was later loaned to the team and made it through the 1971–72 NHL season.

The team later adopted Iceburgh, a more traditional mascot, for the 1993–94 NHL season. While Iceburgh's name is a play on both iceberg and Pittsburgh, not reviving the Penguin Pete name was likely done to avoid confusion with the mascot of the same name at Youngstown State University in nearby Youngstown, Ohio.

Preceded by none	Pittsburgh Penguins mascot 1968	Succeeded by Re-Pete

== See also ==
- List of NHL mascots
