= Pennsylvania Turnpike Commission =

Transportation agency in Pennsylvania, United States

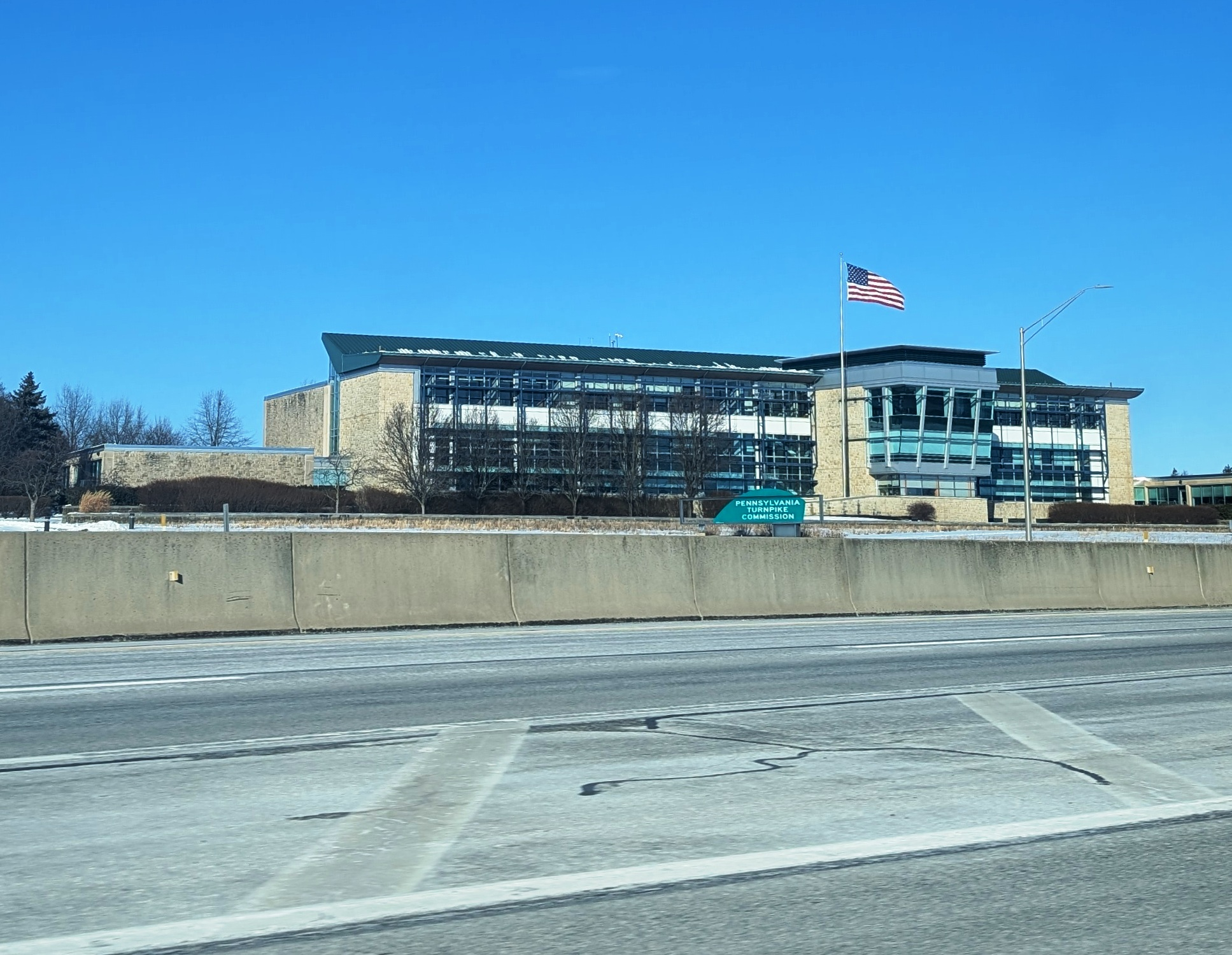
- Agency headquarters building

Agency overview
- Formed: May 31, 1937; 89 years ago
- Jurisdiction: Commonwealth of Pennsylvania
- Headquarters: Lower Swatara Township, Pennsylvania, U.S. (Middletown address)
- Employees: 1,877 (2020)
- Annual budget: $426.2 million (FY 2021)
- Agency executives: Mark P. Compton, Chief Executive Officer; Craig R. Shuey, Chief Operating Officer
- Website: www.paturnpike.com

The Pennsylvania Turnpike Commission (PTC) is an agency created in 1937 to construct, finance, operate, and maintain the Pennsylvania Turnpike (both the mainline and the Northeast Extension). The commission consists of five members. Four members are appointed by the Governor of Pennsylvania, while the fifth member is the Pennsylvania Secretary of Transportation.

In addition to the Pennsylvania Turnpike, the commission also operates the James E. Ross Highway, Amos K. Hutchinson Bypass, Mon–Fayette Expressway, and Pittsburgh's Southern Beltway, the latter two of which are currently under construction.

The PTC is the only transportation agency in Pennsylvania that is not part of PennDOT, though it does coordinate with PennDOT on road design procedures and guidelines. As of February 2021, Mark Compton is the CEO.

== History ==
=== 20th century ===
The PTC was established by law on May 21, 1937, when Pennsylvania Governor George Earle signed Act 211 into law. The first commissioners were named on June 4 of the same year.

PA Act 229 of 1953 states that the PTC shall be dissolved once its debts have been paid:

"When all bonds, notes or other obligations and the interest thereon have been paid [...] the Turnpike and the connecting road, tunnels, and bridges shall become a part of the system of State Highways and shall be maintained by the Department of Highways free of tolls; and thereupon, the Commission shall be dissolved."

In 1957 two commissioners and several contractors were convicted on fraud and conspiracy charges for defrauding the commission of $19 million.

In 1963, a turnpike commissioner who replaced a commissioner from the previous scandal was charged with bribery, extortion and conspiracy.

In 1978, former turnpike commissioner Egidio Cerelli was convicted of extortion, serving time in federal prison.

=== 21st century ===
One of the largest projects the Commission managed was the Pennsylvania Turnpike/Interstate 95 Interchange Project. Legislated in 1978, construction did not begin until after environmental approval in 2004 and design work in 2008. Ground was finally broken in 2013. The total cost for the project exceeded $1 billion; the Commission borrowed from foreign investors for financing half the project by joining with the Delaware Valley Regional Center (DVRC) through the U.S. government's EB-5 program, saving the Commission $35 million over conventional banking channels.

Pennsylvania Act 44 of 2007 required the commission to make quarterly payments to PennDOT, amounting to $450 million annually, to help fund public transportation in Pennsylvania, with the support of then CEO Joe Brimmeier. Act 44 was amended by Pennsylvania Act 89 of 2013 to extend these payments until 2022. Part of the Act included the commission assuming control of and placing tolls on Interstate 80, however this aspect of the plan was rejected by the Federal Highway Administration.

Between 2007 and 2011, the commission spent $406,497 buying cars for the personal and business use of turnpike commissioners.

In March 2009, then governor Ed Rendell fired commission chairman Mitchell Rubin after the FBI indicated he was under investigation for taking a $30,000 a year no-show job for five years from then State Senator Vince Fumo. Rubin later pleaded guilty to obstruction of justice.

In 2010, the commission fired 12 turnpike employees for theft of turnpike time, materials or equipment. Several of the managers dismissed had ties to Vince Fumo or Bob Brady, who was a turnpike commissioner from 1991 to 1998. George Hatalowich, then chief operating officer of the commission was charged with two counts of driving under the influence. Timothy J. Carson, then vice chairman of the commission resigned after two drunk driving crashes while driving turnpike vehicles in 2003 and 2006.

On April 28, 2010, Governor Ed Rendell proposed that the Pennsylvania Turnpike Commission be merged into the Pennsylvania Department of Transportation. A special session of the state legislature voted on this issue on May 4. On August 26, 2010, PennDOT told the Pennsylvania Turnpike Commission that they needed to pay them $118 million for public transit funding provided by Act 44 or PennDOT would have veto power over the Turnpike Commission's decisions.

In 2013, a grand jury found evidence of a "pay to play" culture at the commission. Eight people were charged, including Senate Democratic leader Robert J. Mellow, former Turnpike Commission Chairman Mitchell Rubin, and former turnpike CEO Joseph Brimmeier.

In March 2018, the Owner–Operator Independent Drivers Association filed a lawsuit against the commission, claiming that tolls inhibited interstate commerce and travel. This lawsuit caused the commission to delay all payments toward public transit between July 2018 to July 2019.

In March 2019, the Pennsylvania Turnpike Commission approved a $2 million study regarding a proposed hyperloop system in Pennsylvania. The commission hired the multinational engineering firm AECOM to perform the study, which will examine the impact such a system will have on the turnpike's operation, as well as regulatory and environmental concerns.

In April 2020, the commission stated they might not be able to meet their obligation to help fund the state's public transit agencies and would consider delaying capital projects, except for the $129 million cashless tolling project. In May, acting PennDOT Secretary Yassmin Gramain granted the commission an extension to this payment, saying "Transit received a big number under the CARES Act. There’s not going to be any gap in their transit funding." A coalition of more than 80 unions and public transit rider organizations called on the commissioners to pay their transit funding obligation and for state legislators to find a stable means of transit funding. In November 2020 the commission voted to issue $550 million in bonds to pay this obligation for the year.

On June 2, 2020, the commissioners voted unanimously to abruptly terminate 492 toll workers. CEO Mark Compton cited falling toll revenue and concerns about exposing toll workers to COVID-19 as the reasons the layoffs were necessary. The commissioners said the layoffs would save the commission $42 million in 2020 and $65 million in 2021.

== Highways ==
The Pennsylvania Turnpike Commission finances, operates and maintains the following highways:

- The Pennsylvania Turnpike mainline across southern Pennsylvania, cosigned with Interstates 70, 76, 276 and 95.
- The Pennsylvania Turnpike's Northeast Extension across eastern Pennsylvania, cosigned with Interstate 476.
- The James E. Ross Highway in western Pennsylvania, cosigned with Interstate 376.
- The Amos K. Hutchinson Bypass in western Pennsylvania, signed as Pennsylvania Route 66.
- The Mon/Fayette Expressway in western Pennsylvania, signed as Pennsylvania Route 43.
- The Southern Beltway in western Pennsylvania, signed as Pennsylvania Route 576. At some point in the future, the bypass is expected to be signed as Interstate 576.

== Administration ==
=== Commissioners ===
The turnpike is governed by five commissioners; one is the current Pennsylvania Secretary of Transportation, four are appointed by the Governor of Pennsylvania. As of September 16, 2023, Pennsylvania Turnpike Commissioners are:

- Michael Carroll, Pennsylvania Secretary of Transportation (chairman)
- William K. Lieberman, vice chairman
- Pasquale T. Deon Sr.
- Dr. Keith Leaphart (secretary-treasurer)
- Sean Logan

==== Transparency ====
The Pittsburgh Post-Gazette reported in 2021 that, over five years, the average length of public meetings of the commissioners was 12 minutes. Over 700 votes to spend millions of dollars had been cast with only one dissenting vote. Commission chair Yassmin Gramian says that she contacts other commissioners before the meeting to handle any discussion or potential dissent privately.

=== Executives ===
On February 1, 2013, Mark P. Compton, previously the deputy secretary of administration at PennDOT, became the commission's chief executive officer (CEO), succeeding Roger Nutt.

Craig R. Shuey, previously the government affairs director at the commission, has been chief operating officer of the commission since January 2011. He briefly served as turnpike CEO after Roger Nutt resigned in October 2012.

=== Advisory committee ===
In response to a 2013 grand jury investigation, the commissioners directed CEO Mark Compton to create an advisory committee to evaluate the commission's procurement policies.

== See also ==
- List of Pennsylvania state agencies
- Mitchell Rubin
