= Tad Potter =

Businessman and Pittsburgh Penguins owner (1933–2013)

Thayer R. "Tad" Potter (February 19, 1933 - January 11, 2013) was a Pittsburgh-area businessman and a National Hockey League owner of the Pittsburgh Penguins from 1971 until 1975.

== Biography ==
=== Early life and education ===
Potter was born in Pittsburgh, Pennsylvania, the second of five sons to William and Katharine Potter. He grew up in the nearby borough of Edgewood. He became a three-sport athlete at Edgewood High School (now Woodland Hills High School). He later attended Valley Forge Military Academy in Wayne, Pennsylvania, as a result of misbehavior and poor grades. There Tad improved his academic record and graduated with honors and soon enrolled at Penn State. He married Jean Kutz, a college classmate in 1955. He served as an officer in the United States Navy Reserve and relocated to Newport, Rhode Island, then to Norfolk, Virginia. He and his family returned to Pittsburgh upon completion of his naval tour. During the 1960 World Series and he achieved notoriety by being the first man to greet Bill Mazeroski at home plate after his game-winning home run for the Pittsburgh Pirates in Game 7.

=== Pittsburgh Penguins ===
Tad was passionate about ice hockey and became a fan of the Pittsburgh Penguins. He became a "hockey hound" who encouraged fans to buy season tickets when he heard a buyer wanted to move the Penguins out of Pittsburgh. In 1971 he formed a partnership and purchased the team in order to keep the franchise in the city. The fortunes of the team improved, and the Penguins rose to elite status in the National Hockey League by 1975. Penguins' co-founder Peter Block was also a part of the new ownership group.

However at the end of the Penguins' 1974-75 season, the team filed for bankruptcy. Financial difficulties within the partnership and a salary war with the upstart World Hockey Association led to the move. The ownership group had been negotiating a plan to keep the team while beginning to pay $532,000 in overdue withholding taxes, however a local management change in the team. On June 12, 1975, IRS agents walked into the Pittsburgh Civic Arena and placed a tax lien against the Penguins. Meanwhile, Equibank, the Penguins’ largest creditor, had filed a $5 million suit against the club. Penguins were eventually sold for a mere $3.8 million to a group that included Wren Blair and Al Savill, ending Potter and Block's stake in the team. When the Penguins declared bankruptcy again in the late 1990s, Potter and Block both expressed hope that the Pens would be rescued stating "It’s very, very scary to see this happening to the Penguins again, after all, it was my idea and I want to see it succeed forever". According to Joe Gordon, a public relations director for the Penguins during the team's first two years. He later said that "Mr. Potter was "passionate" about hockey and was "instrumental in keeping hockey in Pittsburgh. We may have lost the team if it hadn't been for Tad and his partners".

=== Coal ===
Potter later forming Kitspaw Fuel, a coal brokerage service and then moving on to site evaluation and development for O'Brien Energy of Philadelphia. Tad's wife, Jean, later stated that his work on coal bed methane projects was his most satisfying professional achievement. Potter was a grandson of the Pittsburgh industrialist Willard Rockwell and had come into some family money. However he was proud this the coal brokerage, because it something he achieved on his own.

=== Later life ===
In retirement he went on annual fly fishing excursions with friends to the Boulder River Ranch in Montana and well as traveled with his wife. He died in his sleep on January 11, 2013, in Penn Hills, Pennsylvania, due to congestive heart failure.
