= Donald Parsons (businessman) =

American lawyer

Donald Holcombe Parsons (June 17, 1930 – July 22, 2012) was an American lawyer, banker, and businessman. He was owner of the Pittsburgh Penguins in the National Hockey League from March 1968 until April 1971.

== Early life and education ==
Born in Detroit, Michigan, he grew up in Devon, Pennsylvania, and attended The Haverford School. At the age of 11, Parsons contracted polio while at summer camp and was told he would never walk again. However he overcame the illness and went on to participate in school sports, tennis doubles and ballroom dancing. In 1948, he attend Phillips Academy Andover before receiving his bachelor of arts degree from Yale University in 1952. He then attended law school at the University of Michigan, receiving his law degree in 1955 and M.B.A. in 1956.

== Business ventures ==
After law school, Parsons lived in Birmingham, Michigan, where he was founder and managing partner of the Michigan-based law firm Parsons, Tennant, Hammond, Hardig and Ziegelman. He later formed The Parsons Group, a group of partnerships that owned 25 commercial banks located throughout the Midwest during the mid to late 1960s. Parsons later ran several real estate developments, including Litchfield Plantation in Pawleys Island, South Carolina, Cedar Hill in Cashiers, North Carolina, and Club at Lake Pointe in northern Michigan.

== Pittsburgh Penguins ownership ==
In March 1968 Parsons purchased the Pittsburgh Penguins from Jack McGregor, and became the club's managing partner. The Penguins were just going into their third year as a franchise, and the team's initial investors were tapped out after having invested in the Pittsburgh Phantoms, a professional soccer team. With the strong backing of H. J. Heinz II and Mellon Bank, the Penguins were sold to the Donald Parsons Group. The sale was opposed vigorously by Henry Hillman and several other of the club's financial backers. Jack McGregor later lamented that “Henry (Hillman), as usual, turned out to be right. Parsons, while a good guy, was not strong enough financially to be a long-term player. The Penguins had to be sold by Parsons in another short three years”. On December 1, 1970, the NHL was appointed power-of-attorney with his ownership of the Penguins, and forced him to sell in early 1971.

As a result of the sale of the Penguins, Parsons ended up with an 80 percent stake in the team. One of his first duties was to promise each member of the Penguins' 1969-70 team if they finished third or better in the Western Division. The team placed second in the division and Parsons paid them what was promised. However, Parsons soon overspent his budget on the team. Penguins' general manager Jack Riley later recalled that Parsons picked him up in a private jet to travel to the 1970 NHL Draft held in Montreal, Quebec. However the following year Riley was given a plane ticket to attend the same event because the NHL took over the Penguins.

On May 15, 1970, the Penguins' star rookie Michel Briere was involved a fatal car accident that would later take his life a year later. During that time Parsons, told the Briere family that he would provide lifetime financial security for Briere, if he was unable to resume his hockey career. Briere remained in a twilight condition, between consciousness and unconsciousness for close to a year and underwent four operations before dying of his injuries on April 13, 1971, at the age of 21.

== Death ==
Parsons later relocated to Palm Beach, Florida, becoming a longtime resident. He died on Monday, July 22, 2012, at the Arden Courts Assisted Living, located in West Palm Beach, of Alzheimer's disease.
