= Frederick Fraley =

American politician

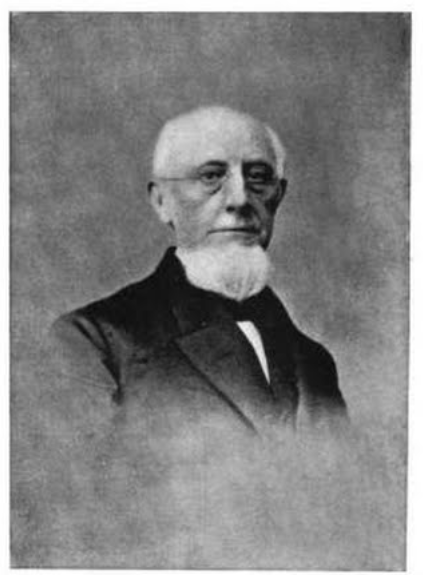

Member of the Pennsylvania Senate for the 1st district
- In office 1837–1839
- Preceded by: Abraham Miller
- Succeeded by: Henry S. Spackman

Philadelphia City Council
- In office 1834–1837

Personal details
- Born: May 28, 1804 Philadelphia, Pennsylvania
- Died: September 23, 1901 (aged 97) Philadelphia, Pennsylvania
- Party: Whig
- Education: University of Pennsylvania

Frederick Fraley (May 28, 1804 – September 23, 1901) was an American businessman, politician, and civic leader from Pennsylvania. He was involved in several successful businesses and served on the Philadelphia City Council and as a member of the Pennsylvania State Senate. He was one of the founders of the Franklin Institute and one of the first directors of Girard College in Philadelphia.

== Early life ==
Fraley was born in Philadelphia, Pennsylvania to John Urban and Ann Elizabeth Laskey Fraley. He was educated at St. John's College, a school at Fourth and Race Street in Philadelphia. He studied law but never applied for the bar. He entered the wholesale hardware business at the age of 16.

== Business career ==
He worked for seven years as secretary of the American Fire Insurance Company and for twenty-three years as president of the Schuylkill Navigation Company. He also worked for the Western Savings Fund Society and as president of the Lehigh Coal and Navigation Company. He was associated with the Philadelphia Board of Trade and served as president of the National Board of Trade.

In 1824 he was one of the founders of the Franklin Institute and served as treasurer for many years. In 1847, he became one of the first directors of Girard College. In 1853 Fraley became a trustee of the University of Pennsylvania. He also worked as president of the Western Saving Fund Society. In 1880, he received an honorary degree of LL.D. from the University of Pennsylvania. He was one of the founders of the Union League of Philadelphia. For the last twenty-one years of his life Fraley was the president of the American Philosophical Society.

== Political career ==
He served on Philadelphia City Council from 1834 to 1837 and as a Whig member of the Pennsylvania State Senate for the 1st district from 1837 to 1839. While in the State Senate, he served as chairman of the committee of investigation of the Buckshot War.

In December 1839 went to Harrisburg, Pennsylvania as a delegate to the Whig Party's national convention, which chose William Henry Harrison to be its candidate in the 1840 presidential election.

He died in his home in Philadelphia on September 23, 1901, and is interred at the Woodlands Cemetery in Philadelphia.
