= Mary-Jane Foster =

American lawyer

- Born: Denver, Colorado
- Education: Bennett College (A.A.); Charter Oak State College (B.S.); Quinnipiac University School of Law (J.D.)
- Alma mater: Charter Oak State College; Quinnipiac University
- Employer: University of Bridgeport
- Known for: Founder and owner, Bridgeport Bluefish
- Title: Vice President of University Relations
- Political party: Democratic

Mary-Jane Foster is an American TV commercial actress, sports team owner and politician. She is the co-founder of the Bridgeport Bluefish, a minor league baseball franchise in the Atlantic League, and the former vice president of university relations at the University of Bridgeport.

In 2011, Foster ran for mayor of Bridgeport, Connecticut, unsuccessfully challenging incumbent mayor Bill Finch in the city's Democratic primary. Foster ran for Mayor of Bridgeport as an independent candidate after losing in the September 2015 Democratic primary. However, she lost the election to Joe Ganim, and later took on the role of chief executive officer for the domestic violence agency Interval House.
