= Vince Fumo =

American politician (born 1943)

Member of the Pennsylvania Senate from the 1st district
- In office April 3, 1978 – November 30, 2008
- Preceded by: Buddy Cianfrani
- Succeeded by: Larry Farnese

Personal details
- Born: May 8, 1943 (age 83) Philadelphia, Pennsylvania, U.S.
- Party: Democratic
- Education: Villanova University (BS); Temple University (JD); University of Pennsylvania (MBA)

Vincent Joseph Fumo (born May 8, 1943) is an American politician, lawyer, and businessman from Philadelphia, Pennsylvania. A Democrat, he represented a South Philadelphia district in the Pennsylvania Senate from 1978 to 2008. On March 16, 2009, he was convicted of 137 federal corruption charges. On July 14, 2009, he was sentenced to 55 months in federal prison.

== Early life and education ==
Fumo holds a B.S. degree from Villanova University (1964), a Juris Doctor degree from Temple University School of Law (1972), and an MBA (1984) from the Wharton School of the University of Pennsylvania. He served on the board of trustees of the National Constitution Center in Philadelphia, a museum dedicated to the U.S. Constitution.

== Career ==
In 1974, Fumo, along with three associates, was the target of a 44 count indictment for mail fraud. The four men, who included the Majority Leader of the State Senate, the head of the Democratic City Executive Committee, and the Chief Clerk of the State House were accused of helping convicted Senator Henry Cianfrani, add 33 ghost employees to the state payroll. At the time, Fumo was an assistant to Peter Camiel in charge of patronage.

In 1978, Fumo was convicted by a jury of 15 counts. However, a federal judge overturned the conviction in 1981 after motions by the defense to acquit.

=== Politics ===
Fumo represented South Philadelphia's 1st Senatorial District beginning in 1978 when he succeeded Buddy Cianfrani, who had been convicted of racketeering, bribery and obstruction of justice.

A powerful State Senator, the Pennsylvania Report said that "[i]t is difficult to catalog and characterize all of his tie-ins and tentacles at all levels of government, but having him on your side in a pitched battle rattles opponents." In 2002, the political website PoliticsPA named him to the list of "Smartest Legislators," calling him "[a]rguably the smartest legislator in Harrisburg."

Fumo was the ranking Democratic Member of the Senate Appropriations Committee until his federal indictment in February 2007. He also served on the Communications & Technology, Consumer Protection, Game & Fisheries, Rules, & Urban Affairs & Housing Committees.

=== Business ===
In addition to his State Senate work, Fumo is associated with the Philadelphia Law firm of Dilworth Paxson LLP. He was the Chairman of First Penn Bank. The bank was founded as Pennsylvania Savings Bank, by his grandfather. Fumo took over control after his father was convicted of bank fraud in 1976. The bank grew rapidly under Fumo's control from $1.5 million in assets to about $550 million, and was eventually sold in 2007 for $94 million, potentially netting $19 million for Fumo.

Fumo was hospitalized on March 2, 2008, after suffering a heart attack at his home. He underwent a successful emergency angioplasty at Hahnemann University Hospital and was released on March 9, 2008.

On March 12, 2008, Fumo announced he was dropping his bid for reelection and retiring from public service, citing his federal indictment.

On March 16, 2009, a Philadelphia Federal jury convicted Fumo on 137 counts of corruption, conspiracy, fraud and more.

=== 2009 conviction ===
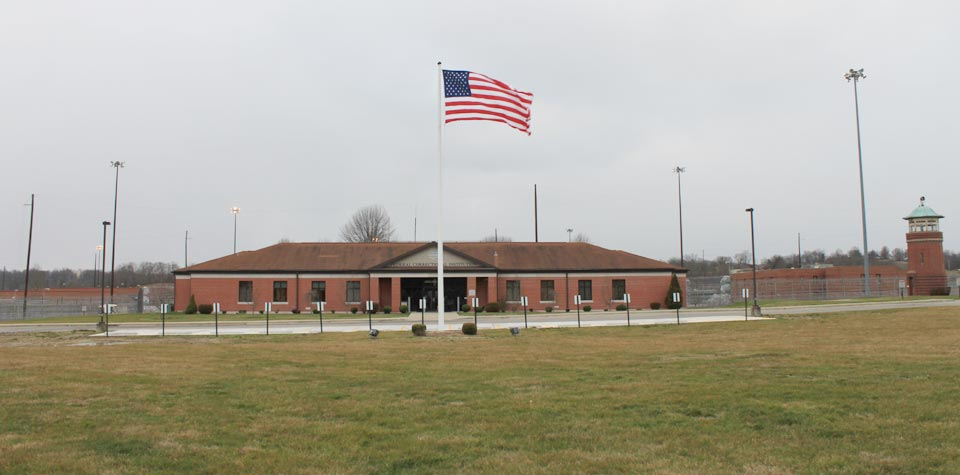
Federal Correctional Institution, Ashland in Kentucky, where Fumo was incarcerated from 2009 to 2014

Fumo was the subject of a federal investigation, which resulted in his indictment in 2007. The investigation related to a charity, run by a former member of Fumo's staff, the Citizens Alliance for Better Neighborhoods. In 2004, PECO, a subsidiary of Exelon, donated $17 million to the organization. Federal prosecutors began an investigation as to whether Fumo had forced the utility to make the donation by initially opposing, then supporting, utility deregulation in the state. There were also allegations that Fumo had used the charity's funds for personal benefit. Fumo also suggested that Verizon hire a law firm, Obermayer Rebmann Maxwell & Hippel, for a three-year, $3 million retainer to handle legal work. The chair of Obermayer's litigation committee, Thomas Leonard, was a prominent Democrat who served as the city's controller in the 1990s and attended Temple University Law School with Fumo in the 1970s; both remained friends since then and worked together on fundraising for Democratic candidates.

In late May 2006, two of Fumo's staffers were arrested and indicted on charges of destroying electronic evidence, including e-mail related to the investigation. The charges were based on e-mails sent by the aides, in which they suggested that Fumo ordered destruction of the documentation.

On February 6, 2007, a Federal grand jury named Fumo in a 137 count indictment, alleging mail fraud, wire fraud, conspiracy, obstruction of justice and filing a false tax return. Charges include using state workers to oversee construction of his mansion, spying on his ex-wife, and work on his farm. Additionally, the indictment accused him of misusing $1 million of state funds and $1 million from his charity for personal and campaign use and commandeering yachts from the Philadelphia Seaport Museum for personal travel.

Immediately before the indictment was handed down, Fumo resigned his position as the ranking Democrat on the Appropriations Committee and vowed to fight the charges.

On March 12, 2008, at a press conference at the Pennsylvania Convention Center in Philadelphia, Fumo announced he was dropping his bid for reelection under stress, saying that the charges against him left "a cloud hanging over [his] head." He did, however, complete his final term in the Senate, which ended at the end of the year. This was reportedly at the insistence of Governor Ed Rendell who was present at the press conference. Fumo also added that the decision had nothing to do with his health issues.

On March 16, 2009, he was found guilty of all 137 counts of corruption and was facing a minimum of ten years in prison. His former aide, Ruth Arnao, was also found guilty of all 45 counts against her.

On July 14, 2009, Fumo was sentenced to 55 months in prison, substantially below the sentencing guidelines of 11 to 14 years. On November 11, 2011, upon a judicial review of his sentence, his prison term was increased by six months and the amount of his court-ordered restitution payment was increased by $1.1 million.

==== Incarceration ====
The Federal Bureau of Prisons ordered Fumo to report to Federal Correctional Institution, Ashland, near Ashland, Kentucky, by August 2009. Fumo was released from prison in August 2013.

Pennsylvania State Senate
Preceded by Buddy Cianfrani	Member of the Pennsylvania Senate for the 1st District; 1978–2008	Succeeded by Larry Farnese
