= Peter Burchfield =

Albert Horne "Peter" Burchfield, III is a former National Hockey League co-owner of the Pittsburgh Penguins starting on April 21, 1971. He made his fortune as the longtime executive of the Joseph Horne Company department store also based in Pittsburgh.
