= Peter Block (ice hockey) =

American NHL franchise owner (1933–2015)

- Born: 1933
- Died: December 13, 2015 (aged 81–82)

Peter Block (1933 – December 13, 2015) was a co-founder of the National Hockey League's Pittsburgh Penguins. He co-owned the team for only one season before selling his shares in 1968. In 1971, Block rejoined the ownership group and retained his stake until the team went bankrupt in 1975. He relocated to California in the mid-1980s to start a business venture.

== Pittsburgh Penguins ==
In 1965, Block and Jack McGregor, a Republican member of the Pennsylvania State Senate, came up with the idea for the club during a car trip along the Pennsylvania Turnpike when they heard the National Hockey League planned to expand from six to 12 teams. Block stated to McGregor that, in order for Pittsburgh to be a true sports town, it needed to have an NHL team. The two men, who were classmates at the University of Pittsburgh School of Law, gathered together a group of investors, which included H. J. Heinz Company CEO H. J. Heinz II, Pittsburgh Steelers owner Art Rooney, and Mellon family heir Richard Mellon Scaife, and made their successful proposal to the NHL. Pittsburgh was awarded a franchise and McGregor and Block each owned a 12.5 percent share of the team. According to McGregor, Block initially laughed at the idea when McGregor's wife, Carol, came up with the name "Penguins". Block argued against the name and favored naming the club the Hornets, from Pittsburgh's long-time and successful affiliate in the American Hockey League.

Block, and several other Penguins' investors, also purchased a second professional franchise in 1967, the Pittsburgh Phantoms, a soccer team in the non-FIFA sanctioned National Professional Soccer League. The club played for just one season folding before the 1968 NASL season due to poor attendance, drawing only an average of 3,122. The Phantoms' financial losses also tapped out Block and many of the Penguins' investors.

Aside from his ownership duties, Block was also the team's vice president and chief operating officer during the season. At end of the team's inaugural season, Block relinquished his share in the team. However he rejoined the ownership group in 1971. During his ownership tenure, Block would bring his stepchildren to the team Christmas party, and his wife, Ida, even gave guitar lessons to former Penguins winger Bob "Battleship" Kelly.

At the end of the Penguins' 1974-75 season, the team filed for bankruptcy. The ownership group had been negotiating a plan to keep the team while beginning to pay $532,000 in overdue withholding taxes; however, a management change disrupted those efforts. On June 12, 1975, IRS agents walked into the Civic Arena and placed a tax lien against the Penguins. Meanwhile Equibank, the Penguins' largest creditor, had filed a $5 million suit against the club. The Penguins were eventually sold for a mere $3.8 million to a group that included Wren Blair, ending Block's stake in the team. When the Penguins declared bankruptcy again in the late 1990s, Block expressed hope that the Penguins would be rescued stating "It's very, very scary to see this happening to the Penguins again, after all, it was my idea and I want to see it succeed forever".

== Death ==
Block died on December 13, 2015, at his home in Santa Monica, California from cancer. He was survived by his wife, Donna, and their daughter, Jennifer. He was also survived by his ex-wife Ida and three stepchildren.
