= Raddysh =

Raddysh is a surname. Notable people with the surname include:

- Darren Raddysh (born 1996), Canadian ice hockey player
- Taylor Raddysh (born 1998), Canadian ice hockey player
