= 2017 Memorial Cup =

Canadian junior men's ice hockey championship

Tournament details
- Venue(s): WFCU Centre; Windsor, Ontario
- Dates: May 19–28, 2017
- Teams: 4
- Host team: Windsor Spitfires (OHL)
- TV partner(s): Sportsnet, TVA Sports, NHL Network

Final positions
- Champions: Windsor Spitfires (OHL) (3rd title)
- Runners-up: Erie Otters (OHL)

Tournament statistics
- Attendance: 44,663
- Scoring leader: Dylan Strome (Otters) (11 points)

Awards
- MVP: Dylan Strome (Otters)

The Memorial Cup trophy

The 2017 Memorial Cup (branded as the 2017 Mastercard Memorial Cup for sponsorship reasons) was a four-team, round-robin format tournament held at the WFCU Centre in Windsor, Ontario from May 19–28, 2017. It was the 99th Memorial Cup championship, which determined the champion of the Canadian Hockey League (CHL). The tournament was hosted by the Windsor Spitfires, who won the right to host the tournament over undisclosed competition. Other participating teams were the OHL champion Erie Otters, the QMJHL champion Saint John Sea Dogs, and the WHL champion Seattle Thunderbirds. The tournament ended with the Windsor Spitfires winning their third Memorial Cup, defeating the Erie Otters 4–3 in the championship final.

The 99th Memorial Cup was dominated by the performances of the two OHL teams. In defeating the Seattle Thunderbirds by 7–1 in a round-robin game on May 21, 2017, the Windsor Spitfires tied a Memorial Cup record for the fastest 3 goals scored by a team in a single period (38 game seconds), matching the record set by the WHL's New Westminster Bruins in the 1978 tournament. In a round-robin game on May 22, 2017, Dylan Strome scored a Memorial Cup single-game record seven points (four goals and three assists), leading the Erie Otters to a 12–5 win over the Saint John Sea Dogs. The Otters' 12 goals for a team in a single game was also a Memorial Cup record.

All games were televised nationally in Canada on Sportsnet and TVA Sports. The NHL Network televised the games in the United States.

== Round-robin standings ==
Pos	Team	Pld	W	L	GF	GA	
1	Windsor Spitfires (OHL/Host)	3	3	0	14	5	Advanced directly to the championship game
2	Erie Otters (OHL)	3	2	1	18	11	Advanced to the semifinal game
3	Saint John Sea Dogs (QMJHL)	3	1	2	14	15	Advanced to the semifinal game
4	Seattle Thunderbirds (WHL)	3	0	3	3	18	

== Schedule ==
All times local (UTC −4)

=== Round robin ===
May 19	Windsor Spitfires	3–2	Saint John Sea Dogs	WFCU Centre	Recap
Jeremiah Addison (1) – pp – 4:07		First period	No scoring
Jeremy Bracco (1) – 1:43		Second period	No scoring
Aaron Luchuk (1) – 15:12		Third period	2:46 – Thomas Chabot (1); 3:10 – pp – Nathan Noel (1)
Michael DiPietro 20 saves / 22 shots		Goalie stats	Callum Booth 20 saves / 23 shots

May 20	Seattle Thunderbirds	2–4	Erie Otters	WFCU Centre	Recap
No scoring		First period	No scoring
Scott Eansor (1) – 9:01; Austin Strand (1) – 19:07		Second period	5:40 – pp – Alex DeBrincat (1); 17:59 – Jordan Sambrook (1)
No scoring		Third period	1:36 – Dylan Strome (1); 18:41 – en – Christian Girhiny (1)
Carl Stankowski 31 saves / 34 shots		Goalie stats	Troy Timpano 18 saves / 20 shots

May 21	Seattle Thunderbirds	1–7	Windsor Spitfires	WFCU Centre	Recap
No scoring		First period	4:48 – Graham Knott (1); 5:09 – Julius Nattinen (1); 5:26 – Logan Brown (1)
Keegan Kolesar (1) – 13:34		Second period	18:24 – pp – Julius Nattinen (2)
No scoring		Third period	0:33 – pp – Graham Knott (2); 3:48 – Jeremiah Addison (2); 13:07 – Jeremy Bracco (2)
Carl Stankowski 3 saves / 6 shots Rylan Toth 18 saves / 22 shots		Goalie stats	Michael DiPietro 24 saves / 25 shots

May 22	Saint John Sea Dogs	5–12	Erie Otters	WFCU Centre	Recap
Cédric Paré (1) – 5:43; Mathieu Joseph (1) – 13:32		First period	1:06 – Taylor Raddysh (1); 6:40 – Darren Raddysh (1); 8:33 – Kyle Maksimovich (1); 10:11 – Dylan Strome (2); 16:27 – Anthony Cirelli (1)
Spencer Smallman (1) – 17:52		Second period	6:46 – pp – Taylor Raddysh (2); 8:26 – pp – Dylan Strome (3); 18:47 – Alex DeBrincat (2); 19:52 – pp – Darren Raddysh (2)
Cédric Paré (2) – 14:29; Julien Gauthier (1) – 15:22		Third period	0:22 – Ivan Lodnia (1); 5:32 – Dylan Strome (4); 13:20 – Dylan Strome (5)
Callum Booth 9 saves / 14 shots Alex D'Orio 18 saves / 25 shots		Goalie stats	Troy Timpano 18 saves / 23 shots

May 23	Saint John Sea Dogs	7–0	Seattle Thunderbirds	WFCU Centre	Recap
No scoring		First period	No scoring
Joe Veleno (1) – 1:14; Chase Stewart (1) – 14:04; Mathieu Joseph (2) – 14:19; Spencer Smallman (2) – 14:57; Cole Reginato (1) – 16:29; Bokondji Imama (1) – 17:13		Second period	No scoring
Joseph Veleno (2) – 6:21		Third period	No scoring
Callum Booth 31 saves / 31 shots		Goalie stats	Carl Stankowski 10 saves / 14 shots Rylan Toth 11 saves / 14 shots

May 24	Erie Otters	2–4	Windsor Spitfires	WFCU Centre	Recap
No scoring		First period	5:50 – Jeremiah Addison (3); 16:08 – Jeremiah Addison (4)
No scoring		Second period	0:43 – pp – Mikhail Sergachev (1)
Kyle Maksimovich (2) – 8:10; Taylor Raddysh (3) – pp – 17:34		Third period	13:31 – Jeremiah Addison (5)
Troy Timpano 15 saves / 19 shots		Goalie stats	Michael DiPietro 33 saves / 35 shots

=== Playoff round ===
==== Semi-final ====
May 26	Erie Otters	6–3	Saint John Sea Dogs	WFCU Centre	Recap
Darren Raddysh (3) – 9:56		First period	14:10 – Joe Veleno (3)
Taylor Raddysh (3) – pp – 10:57		Second period	19:18 – pp – Julien Gauthier (2)
Dylan Strome (6) – 2:38; German Poddubnyi (1) – 3:45; Taylor Raddysh (5) – pp – 12:31; Warren Foegele (1) – en – 19:26		Third period	16:28 – Thomas Chabot (2)
Troy Timpano 20 saves / 23 shots		Goalie stats	Callum Booth 31 saves / 36 shots

==== Final ====
May 28	Windsor Spitfires	4–3	Erie Otters	WFCU Centre	Recap
Jeremy Bracco (3) – pp – 16:07		First period	16:55 – pp – Dylan Strome (7)
Logan Stanley (1) – 6:27; Graham Knott (3) – pp – 14:53		Second period	5:35 – pp – Warren Foegele (2); 12:41 – T. J. Fergus (1)
Aaron Luchuk (2) – 5:07		Third period	No scoring
Michael DiPietro 32 saves / 35 shots		Goalie stats	Troy Timpano 18 saves / 22 shots

== Statistical leaders ==
=== Skaters ===
Player	Team	GP	G	A	Pts	PIM
Dylan Strome	Erie Otters	5	7	4	11	8
Taylor Raddysh	Erie Otters	5	5	6	11	0
Alex DeBrincat	Erie Otters	5	2	8	10	2
Jeremy Bracco	Windsor Spitfires	4	3	5	8	2
Darren Raddysh	Erie Otters	5	3	5	8	0
Anthony Cirelli	Erie Otters	5	1	7	8	0
Warren Foegele	Erie Otters	5	2	5	7	4
Gabriel Vilardi	Windsor Spitfires	4	0	7	7	0
Jeremiah Addison	Windsor Spitfires	4	5	1	6	2
Julien Gauthier	Saint John Sea Dogs	4	2	4	6	0

GP = Games played; G = Goals; A = Assists; Pts = Points; PIM = Penalty minutes

=== Goaltending ===
This is a combined table of the top goaltenders based on goals against average and save percentage with at least 120 minutes played. The table is sorted by GAA.

Player	Team	GP	W	L	OTL	SA	GA	GAA	SV%	SO	TOI
Michael DiPietro	Windsor Spitfires	4	4	0	0	117	8	2.00	.932	0	240
Troy Timpano	Erie Otters	5	3	2	0	107	18	3.66	.832	0	295
Callum Booth	Saint John Sea Dogs	4	1	2	0	104	13	4.06	.875	1	192

GP = Games played; W = Wins; L = Losses; SA = Shots against; GA = Goals against; GAA = Goals against average; SV% = Save percentage; SO = Shutouts; TOI = Time on ice (minutes:seconds)

== Awards ==
- Stafford Smythe Memorial Trophy (MVP): Dylan Strome, Erie Otters
- Ed Chynoweth Trophy (Leading Scorer): Dylan Strome, Erie Otters
- George Parsons Trophy (Sportsmanlike): Anthony Cirelli, Erie Otters
- Hap Emms Memorial Trophy (Top Goalie): Michael DiPietro, Windsor Spitfires
- All-Star Team:

Goaltender: Michael DiPietro, Windsor Spitfires
Defence: Darren Raddysh, Erie Otters; Mikhail Sergachev, Windsor Spitfires
Forwards: Gabriel Vilardi, Windsor Spitfires; Alex DeBrincat, Erie Otters; Taylor Raddysh, Erie Otters

== Rosters ==
=== Windsor Spitfires (host) ===
- Head coach: Rocky Thompson

Pos.	No.	Player
G	32	Mario Culina
G	64	Michael DiPietro
D	5	Austin McEneny
D	8	Connor Corcoran
D	17	Logan Stanley
D	24	Daniel Robertson
D	28	Tyler Nother
D	31	Mikhail Sergachev
D	51	Jalen Chatfield
D	74	Sean Day
F	7	Tyler Angle
F	10	Jeremiah Addison
F	13	Gabriel Vilardi
F	19	Adam Laishram
F	21	Logan Brown
F	25	Julius Nattinen
F	26	Cole Purboo
F	27	Hayden McCool
F	37	Graham Knott
F	61	Luke Boka
F	91	Aaron Luchuk
F	96	Cristiano DiGiacinto
F	97	Jeremy Bracco

=== Saint John Sea Dogs (QMJHL) ===
- Head coach: Danny Flynn

Pos.	No.	Player
G	40	Callum Booth
G	33	Alex D'Orio
D	2	Bailey Webster
D	4	Simon Bourque
D	5	Thomas Chabot
D	26	David Comeau
D	34	Chase Stewart
D	36	Alexandre Bernier
D	38	Jakub Zbořil
F	7	Kyle Ward
F	9	Joe Veleno
F	10	Nathan Noel
F	12	Julien Gauthier
F	14	Samuel Leblanc
F	15	Matthew Highmore
F	16	Samuel Dove-McFalls
F	18	Spencer Smallman
F	21	Mathieu Joseph
F	24	Cédric Paré
F	27	Matt Green
F	37	Cole Reginato
F	51	Bokondji Imama

=== Erie Otters (OHL) ===
- Head coach: Kris Knoblauch

Pos.	No.	Player
G	30	Joseph Murdaca
G	33	Troy Timpano
D	2	Mitchell Byrne
D	6	Jordan Sambrook
D	14	Erik Černák
D	20	Josh Wainman
D	24	Darren Raddysh
D	25	T. J. Fergus
D	47	Owen Headrick
D	49	Cameron Lizotte
F	7	Christian Girhiny
F	9	Kyle Maksimovich
F	12	Alex DeBrincat
F	15	Kyle Pettit
F	17	Taylor Raddysh
F	19	Dylan Strome
F	21	Patrick Fellows
F	22	Anthony Cirelli
F	27	Ivan Lodnia
F	37	Warren Foegele
F	39	Gera Poddubnyi
F	42	Haydn Hopkins
F	46	Cade Robinson

=== Seattle Thunderbirds (WHL) ===
- Head coach: Steve Konowalchuk

Pos.	No.	Player
G	1	Carl Stankowski
G	31	Rylan Toth
D	2	Austin Strand
D	3	Anthony Bishop
D	4	Turner Ottenbreit
D	5	Jarret Tyszka
D	6	Aaron Hyman
D	7	Reece Harsch
D	25	Ethan Bear
F	8	Scott Eansor
F	11	Elijah Brown
F	12	Ryan Gropp
F	13	Mathew Barzal
F	16	Alexander True
F	17	Tyler Adams
F	18	Sami Moilanen
F	19	Donovan Neuls
F	20	Zack Andrusiak
F	21	Matthew Wedman
F	23	Luke Ormsby
F	26	Nolan Volcan
F	28	Keegan Kolesar

== Road to the Cup ==
=== OHL Playoffs ===
Conference quarterfinals	Conference semifinals
1	Erie	4
8	Sarnia	0
1	Erie	4
4	London	3
4	London	4
5	Windsor	3
Western conference
2	Sault Ste. Marie	4
7	Flint	1
2	Sault Ste. Marie	2
3	Owen Sound	4
3	Owen Sound	4
6	Kitchener	1
1	Peterborough	4
8	Niagara	0
1	Peterborough	4
4	Kingston	0
4	Kingston	4
5	Hamilton	3
Eastern conference
2	Mississauga	4
7	Ottawa	2
2	Mississauga	4
3	Oshawa	1
3	Oshawa	4
6	Sudbury	2

Conference finals
1	Erie	4
3	Owen Sound	2
1	Peterborough	0
2	Mississauga	4

Finals
W1	Erie	4
E2	Mississauga	1

=== QMJHL Playoffs ===
Round 1
1	Saint John	4
16	Rimouski	0
3	Shawinigan	2
14	Val-d'Or	4
2	Rouyn-Noranda	4
15	Halifax	2
8	Chicoutimi	4
9	Victoriaville	0
4	Charlottetown	4
13	Baie-Comeau	0
7	Cape Breton	4
10	Gatineau	3
5	Blainville-Boisbriand	4
12	Drummondville	0
6	Acadie–Bathurst	4
11	Quebec	0

Quarter-finals
1	Saint John	4
14	Val-d'Or	0
2	Rouyn-Noranda	3
8	Chicoutimi	4
4	Charlottetown	4
7	Cape Breton	0
5	Blainville-Boisbriand	4
6	Acadie–Bathurst	3

Semi-finals
1	Saint John	4
8	Chicoutimi	2
4	Charlottetown	1
5	Blainville-Boisbriand	4

President's Cup Championship
1	Saint John	4
5	Blainville-Boisbriand	0

=== WHL Playoffs ===
Conference Quarter-finals	Conference Semi-finals
E1	Regina	4
W2	Calgary	0
E1	Regina	4
E3	Swift Current	3
E2	Moose Jaw	3
E3	Swift Current	4
Eastern
C1	Medicine Hat	4
W1	Brandon	0
C1	Medicine Hat	3
C2	Lethbridge	4
C2	Lethbridge	4
C3	Red Deer	3
U1	Everett	4
W2	Victoria	2
U1	Everett	0
U2	Seattle	4
U2	Seattle	4
U3	Tri-City	0
Western
B2	Kelowna	4
B3	Kamloops	2
B2	Kelowna	4
W1	Portland	1
B1	Prince George	2
W1	Portland	4

Conference Finals
E1	Regina	4
C2	Lethbridge	2
U2	Seattle	4
B2	Kelowna	2

WHL Championship
E1	Regina	2
U2	Seattle	4
