= Alex DeBrincat =

American ice hockey player (born 1997)

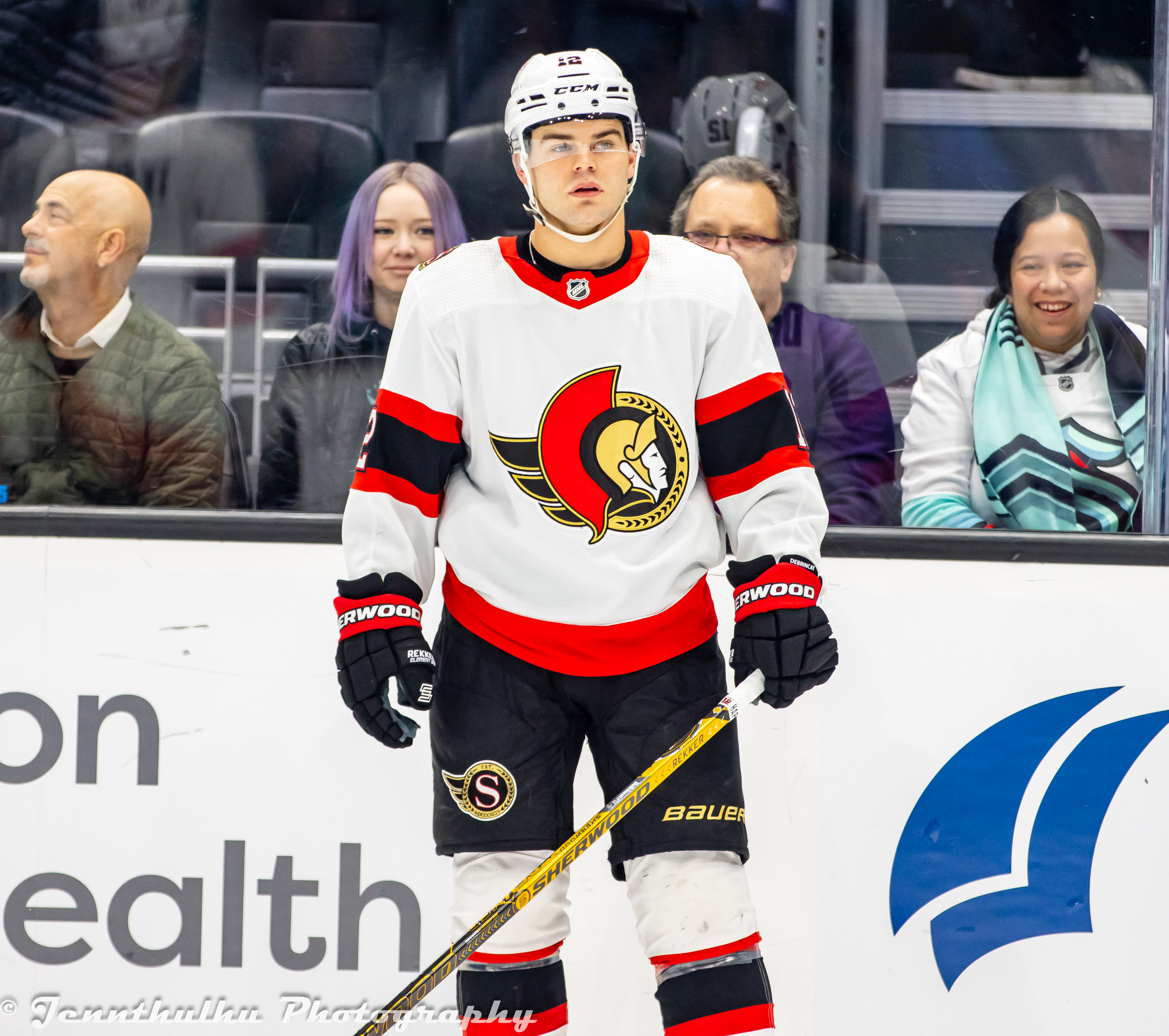
- DeBrincat with the Ottawa Senators in March 2023
- Born: December 18, 1997 (age 28) Farmington Hills, Michigan, U.S.
- Height: 5 ft 8 in (173 cm)
- Weight: 180 lb (82 kg; 12 st 12 lb)
- Position: Winger
- Shoots: Right
- NHL team Former teams: Detroit Red Wings; Chicago Blackhawks; Ottawa Senators
- National team: United States
- NHL draft: 39th overall, 2016; Chicago Blackhawks
- Playing career: 2017–present

Alexander Lloyd DeBrincat (born December 18, 1997) is an American professional ice hockey player who is a winger and alternate captain for the Detroit Red Wings of the National Hockey League (NHL). He was selected by the Chicago Blackhawks in the second round, 39th overall, of the 2016 NHL entry draft. He has previously played for the Blackhawks and the Ottawa Senators.

Born in Farmington Hills, Michigan, DeBrincat spent one year at Harrison High School before transferring to Lake Forest Academy in Illinois. He had planned to play college ice hockey in Massachusetts but signed with the Erie Otters of the Ontario Hockey League (OHL) for the 2014–15 season. There, he set a franchise record with over 50 goals and 100 points in his first season, and he won the Emms Family Award and CHL Rookie of the Year trophies. During the 2016–17 season, DeBrincat became the all-time Otters goal leader and the top scorer of any OHL player born in the United States. He won the Eddie Powers Memorial Trophy, Jim Mahon Memorial Trophy, Red Tilson Trophy, and CHL Player of the Year award for his performance. He spent three years with the Otters, becoming the second player in OHL history to score 50 goals and 100 points all three years.

DeBrincat joined the Blackhawks for the 2017–18 season, where he experienced goal streaks and droughts as a rookie, including three hat-tricks. He surpassed his rookie scoring totals in 2018–19 season, but fell into a slump during the 2019–20 season, particularly when he was not on the power play. DeBrincat's offensive production improved during the COVID-19 pandemic-shortened 2020–21 season, during which he maintained a pace of over a point per game. DeBrincat continued this production the following year when he represented the Blackhawks at the NHL All-Star Game and recorded his second 40-goal season.

== Early life ==
DeBrincat was born on December 18, 1997, in Farmington Hills, Michigan, to David and Tracey DeBrincat, who met at Michigan State University. His favorite ice hockey player as a child was Pavel Datsyuk, who played for the Detroit Red Wings of the National Hockey League (NHL) from 2001 to 2016. DeBrincat attended Harrison High School in Farmington Hills for one year before transferring to Lake Forest Academy, a college preparatory school in Illinois. Because all hockey players at Lake Forest were required to play a spring semester sport, DeBrincat also played baseball. In his single season there, he scored 54 goals and recorded 111 points in 50 games.

== Playing career ==
=== Amateur ===
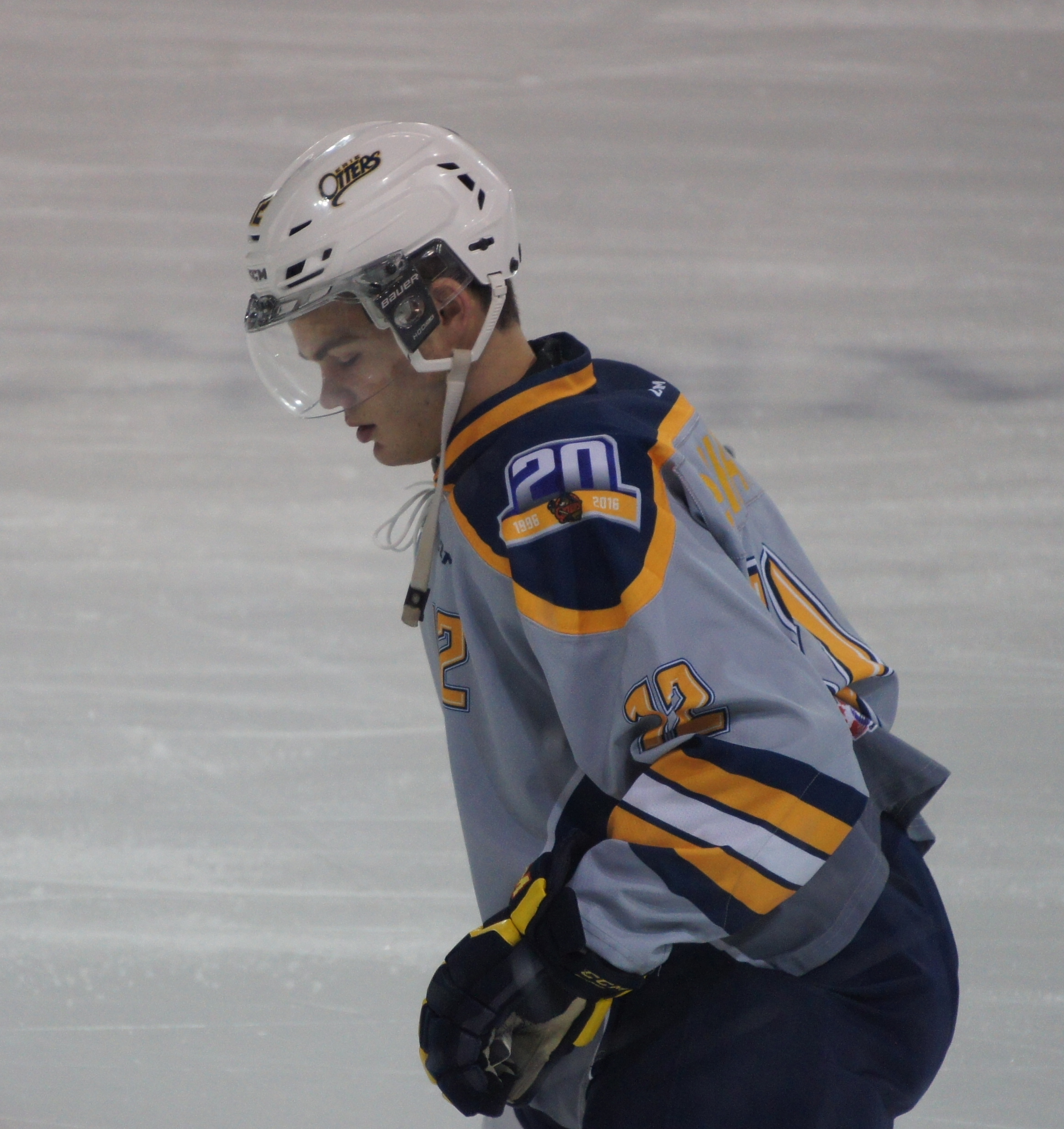
DeBrincat with the Erie Otters in December 2015

DeBrincat signed with the Erie Otters of the Ontario Hockey League (OHL) as a free agent on April 28, 2014. At the time, he had planned to play junior ice hockey and then attend the University of Massachusetts Amherst, where he had committed to play college ice hockey for the Minutemen, but he left Lake Forest to play for the Otters. Erie general manager Sherwood Bassin had scouted him during Lake Forest's 8–2 rout of the Soo Indians, in which DeBrincat scored three goals and recorded two assists.

DeBrincat scored his first OHL goal in his first game with the Otters, a 7–1 win over the Saginaw Spirit to open the 2014–15 season. After scoring 10 goals and 21 points in 10 games, DeBrincat was named the OHL Rookie of the Month for October 2014. He followed that with his first junior hockey hat-trick in a 5–2 win over the Sarnia Sting on November 7. He was named the OHL Rookie of the Month again in November with another nine goals and 17 points in 13 games. DeBrincat finished the regular season with a six-point game in Erie's 8–7 win over the Niagara IceDogs. In addition to securing the Otters' 50th win of the season, DeBrincat finished the season with 51 goals and 104 points, becoming the first rookie in franchise history to score 50 goals and 100 points. He added another nine goals and 16 points in 20 playoff games, but the Otters lost to the Oshawa Generals in the J. Ross Robertson Cup finals. At the end of the season, DeBrincat followed Connor McDavid as only the second Otter to win the Emms Family Award, given to the OHL Rookie of the Year, and in May, he was named the CHL Rookie of the Year. He was also named to the OHL All-Rookie First Team and the Second All-Star Team.

On October 1, 2015, DeBrincat scored five goals in the Niagara IceDogs' home opener for the 2015–16 season. The following week, he had a four-goal game against Niagara, giving the Otters a 7–2 win to stay unbeaten through five games. He was named the OHL Player of the Month after scoring 16 goals and 23 points in 12 games, and he followed the award with his third hat-trick of the season, this time against the Peterborough Petes. That January, DeBrincat was one of two Otters named to the CHL/NHL Top Prospects Game, playing on Team Cherry. DeBrincat scored his 50th goal of the season against the Owen Sound Attack on March 17, becoming the first player in franchise history to record consecutive 50-goal seasons and the first OHL player to do so since Tyler Toffoli in 2011 and 2012. Two days later, he picked up his 100th point with two assists in the Otters' 4–2 win over the London Knights. DeBrincat finished his sophomore OHL season with 51 goals and 101 points, and he was named to the 2015–16 OHL Third All-Star Team. Additionally, he was a highly rated prospect going into the 2016 NHL entry draft: the NHL Central Scouting Bureau ranked DeBrincat 20th among all North American skaters in their midterm rankings and 21st in their final rankings. In June, he was drafted in the second round, 39th overall, by the Chicago Blackhawks of the NHL. He signed a three-year, entry-level contract with the team on November 7, 2016.

After missing the first three games of the 2016–17 season in Blackhawks training camp, DeBrincat returned to the Otters to pick up 15 points in six games. DeBrincat and his teammate Taylor Raddysh were named the OHL's Co-Players of the Month for November 2016 after they both scored 27 points in 12 games. He was the first player that season to reach the 30-goal mark, doing so through 28 games. DeBrincat was named the Player of the Month again in February after leading all players with 32 points in 12 games. The month also came with several milestones. He scored his 40th goal of the season and 142nd of his career on February 3 against Peterborough, becoming the Otters' all-time scoring leader. On February 11, his four points against the Saginaw Spirit helped him cross the 300-point marker for his career, and with three points against London the following week, he became the first OHL player to record 100 points during the 2016–17 season. On February 21, DeBrincat joined Dale McCourt as the only two players in OHL history to score 50 goals in three consecutive seasons. He finished the month with two goals against the Barrie Colts on February 27, putting him ahead of Rob Schremp as the OHL's all-time leading goal scorer from the United States. In the final game of the regular season, a 5–2 win over the Guelph Storm, DeBrincat scored his 65th goal, a single-season record for the Otters.

With 65 goals and 127 points in 63 games, DeBrincat won the 2017 Eddie Powers Memorial Trophy for the OHL's leading scorer, as well as the Jim Mahon Memorial Trophy for the top-scoring right winger in the league. He was an OHL First-Team All-Star and the recipient of the 2016–17 Red Tilson Trophy, given to the OHL's most outstanding player. He followed the OHL awards season by being named the CHL Player of the Year. Although Warren Foegele won the Wayne Gretzky 99 Award for the OHL playoffs' most valuable player, DeBrincat led the playoffs in scoring with 13 goals and 38 points in 22 games as the Otters won the J. Ross Robertson Cup for the second time in franchise history. The Otters lost the 2017 Memorial Cup finals to the tournament hosts, the Windsor Spitfires of the OHL, but DeBrincat was named to the Memorial Cup All-Star Team. DeBrincat finished his OHL career with 167 goals and 332 points in 191 regular season games, and an additional 30 goals and 73 points in 55 postseason games.

=== Professional (2017–present) ===
==== Chicago Blackhawks (2017–2022) ====
Prior to the start of the 2017–18 season, the Blackhawks traded Artemi Panarin to the Columbus Blue Jackets, a move that created an opening for DeBrincat on Chicago's opening night roster if he performed well in training camp. He earned preseason praise from head coach Joel Quenneville, who said DeBrincat "seems to have a good approach to the game" and "fit in well with his teammates" following a 4–2 victory over the Detroit Red Wings. DeBrincat ultimately made the opening night roster, making his NHL debut on October 4, 2017, and playing on the third offensive line with Patrick Sharp and Artem Anisimov. He scored his first NHL goal on October 10, beating Carey Price of the Montreal Canadiens and helping the Blackhawks to a 3–1 victory. After a slow October in which he had one goal and four assists, DeBrincat, playing on the third line with Sharp and Ryan Hartman, scored 10 goals in November. On November 27, he scored a hat-trick in the Blackhawks' 7–3 rout of the Anaheim Ducks. He was the second-youngest player to score a hat-trick in franchise history, four days younger than Jeremy Roenick had been when he set the record. Promoted to the top line with Jonathan Toews and Anthony Duclair, DeBrincat broke a seven-game scoring drought on January 26 with his second hat-trick, this time against the Red Wings. He was the youngest player in franchise history to score two hat-tricks and the first rookie to do so since Steve Larmer during the 1982–83 season. Shortly after another 12-game goal drought, DeBrincat's third hat-trick came on March 18 against the St. Louis Blues. It was the first time that any Blackhawk rookie had three hat-tricks in one season and the first time that any United States-born rookie had done so since Tony Granato of the New York Rangers in 1988–89. Despite receiving less than 15 minutes of ice time per game, DeBrincat finished his rookie season with 28 goals and 52 points, and he became the youngest player to receive the Blackhawks Player of the Year Award at the team's end-of-season banquet. Those 28 goals came in streaks, however: in 82 games, DeBrincat had four droughts of at least seven games where he did not score. Despite DeBrincat's performance, the Blackhawks finished the season with a 33–39–10 record, last in the NHL Central Division and the franchise's worst since 2007–08.

DeBrincat started the 2018–19 season on a hot streak, with six points in his first five games. That November, the Blackhawks traded Nick Schmaltz to the Arizona Coyotes for Brendan Perlini and DeBrincat's OHL teammate Dylan Strome, who was immediately placed on DeBrincat's line. Partway through the season, head coach Jeremy Colliton dropped DeBrincat from the second to the third line as part of his larger vision to have one prominent goal-scorer on three of the four lines. By the NHL All-Star Game break at the start of February, DeBrincat had 25 goals and 53 points in 51 games, including seven goals in 10 games in January. On February 18, 2019, DeBrincat had a five-point game, adding two assists to his fourth career hat-trick in the Blackhawks' 8–7 win over the Ottawa Senators. His two goals against the San Jose Sharks on March 29 made DeBrincat the second-youngest Blackhawk to reach 40-goals in a season. He was 21 years and 100 days old at the time, 35 days older than Jeremy Roenick when he reached the milestone in 1991. Playing in all 82 games for the second season in a row, DeBrincat surpassed his rookie season with 41 goals and 76 points at the end of the year.

On October 3, 2019, the Blackhawks signed DeBrincat to a three-year, $19.2 million contract extension. He entered the 2019–20 season in a scoring drought, with only five goals through his first 23 games, but contributed as a playmaker, his 13 assists in that span second only to Patrick Kane's 18. DeBrincat snapped his 12-game goalless streak on December 5 when he scored on Tuukka Rask in the third period of the Blackhawks' 4–3 overtime win against the Boston Bruins. By the time that the COVID-19 pandemic forced the NHL to suspend operations in March 2020, DeBrincat had 18 goals, 27 assists and 45 points in 70 games, a significant decrease from the previous year. Shortly before the pandemic pause, Colliton told reporters, "He's had the chances, he's had as many opportunities this year, I think the puck hasn't gone in the net as often." He particularly struggled at even strength: between December 27 and February 10, all four of his goals came on the power play. DeBrincat made his NHL postseason debut when he joined the Blackhawks in the quarantine bubble for the 2020 playoffs, and he scored two goals and six points in nine games before the Vegas Golden Knights eliminated the Blackhawks in the Western Conference First Round.

The Blackhawks experienced a COVID-19 outbreak early in the 2020–21 season, and DeBrincat was placed in virus protocols on January 26, 2021. He returned on February 2, 2021, for the Blackhawks' 4–3 shootout loss to the Carolina Hurricanes, and he recorded four goals, two assists, and 17 shots on goal in his first three games back. DeBrincat and Kane were the Blackhawks' top offensive producers at the start of the COVID-shortened season, combining for 3.75 goals per game through the first third of the year. DeBrincat scored his 100th NHL goal on March 6, 2021, with a goal on Curtis McElhinney in the Blackhawks' 4–3 shootout win over the Tampa Bay Lightning. Outside of scoring, DeBrincat showed a significant increase in stealing the puck from opponents, a skill that he began practicing the season prior as a way to contribute during his goal droughts. He finished the season with 32 goals and 56 points in 52 games. That July, DeBrincat was one of 11 players the Blackhawks protected from being taken by the Seattle Kraken in the 2021 NHL expansion draft.

Prior to the 2021–22 season, the Blackhawks announced that DeBrincat would serve as an alternate captain for the team's home games, while Connor Murphy would serve in that capacity for away games. He continued playing with Kane, scoring nine goals through 16 games, including his first Gordie Howe hat trick in Chicago's game against Seattle on November 18, 2021, with a fight against Yanni Gourde, a goal on Philipp Grubauer and an assist on a goal by Seth Jones. On January 13, 2022, DeBrincat, who had 23 goals and five multi-goal games at that point in the season, was named to his first NHL All-Star Game as the Blackhawks' representative. DeBrincat scored his 40th goal of the season on April 21, when the Blackhawks faced Karel Vejmelka and the Arizona Coyotes. Entering the game on a seven-game scoreless drought, DeBrincat became the eighth player to record multiple 40-goal seasons as a member of the Blackhawks. DeBrincat was the only member of the team to play in all 82 games during the 2021–22 season, and he finished with a career-tying 41 goals, as well as a career-high 37 assists and 78 points. He also showed improvement defensively, leading to a career-high 20:48 minutes of ice time per game. Across five seasons with the Blackhawks, DeBrincat recorded 160 goals and 307 points in 368 regular season games, as well as two goals and six points in nine postseason appearances.

==== Ottawa Senators (2022–2023) ====
Following their poor finish in the 2021–22 NHL season, the Blackhawks decided to tear down their roster and begin a rebuild in advance of the 2022 NHL entry draft. On July 7, 2022, the Blackhawks traded DeBrincat to the Ottawa Senators in exchange for the seventh and 39th overall picks in the 2022 draft, as well as a third-round pick in the 2024 NHL entry draft. He appeared in all 82 games for Ottawa, where he recorded 66 points (27 goals, 39 assists). DeBrincat became a restricted free agent after the 2022–23 season, but was uninterested in signing an extension with the Senators.

==== Detroit Red Wings (2023–present) ====
On July 9, 2023, DeBrincat was traded to the Red Wings in exchange for Dominik Kubalík, prospect Donovan Sebrango, a conditional 2024 first-round draft pick and Detroit's 2024 fourth-round selection; the Red Wings then signed DeBrincat to a four-year contract extension with an average annual value of $7.875 million. DeBrincat, a Michigan-native, expressed enthusiasm in playing for Detroit, commenting "Growing up here and rooting for the Red Wings when I was younger, it's definitely a dream come true."

On April 9, 2026, he scored his 40th goal of the season. He became the Red Wings' first 40-goal scorer since Marian Hossa during the 2008–09 season.

== International play ==
Medal record

Representing United States

Ice hockey

World Championships
Bronze medal – third place	2018 Denmark	

World Junior Championships
Bronze medal – third place	2016 Finland	

DeBrincat made his international tournament debut when he represented the United States junior team at the 2016 World Junior Ice Hockey Championships in Helsinki. He was ejected on a spearing penalty in the first game of the tournament and missed the next two with a shoulder injury, after which he was relegated to a bench player role for the remainder of the tournament. Team USA took bronze, with DeBrincat scoring one goal in five games. He was expected to make the team again for the 2017 World Junior Ice Hockey Championships based on his performance that season with the Otters, but he was cut from the team and sent back to Erie during evaluations.

Following the conclusion of his rookie NHL season, DeBrincat was one of four Blackhawks named to the United States senior team for the 2018 IIHF World Championship in Denmark. He scored one goal and nine points in ten tournament games, and his team came away with the bronze medal. DeBrincat appeared for Team USA again at the 2019 IIHF World Championship in Slovakia, where he contributed seven goals and nine points in eight games for the seventh-place team.

== Personal life ==
DeBrincat's older brother Andrew graduated from Lake Forest Academy in 2012. After four years at American International College, Andrew began playing professional ice hockey in 2019, and has appeared in the ECHL for the Cincinnati Cyclones and Kalamazoo Wings. DeBrincat and his brother are of Maltese descent on their father's side.

DeBrincat married Lyndsey Bice, in July 2021. Their first child, Archie David DeBrincat, was born on May 18, 2022.

In April 2020, DeBrincat was the Blackhawks' representative in the NHL Player Gaming Challenge, which featured one player from every NHL franchise. The charity video game tournament was held to raise money for the CDC Foundation during the COVID-19 pandemic.

== Career statistics ==
=== Regular season and playoffs ===
			Regular season					Playoffs
Season	Team	League	GP	G	A	Pts	PIM	GP	G	A	Pts	PIM
2013–14	Lake Forest Academy	MPHL	13	16	12	28	16	3	4	2	6	0
2013–14	Lake Forest Academy	USHS	50	54	57	111	28	—	—	—	—	—
2014–15	Erie Otters	OHL	68	51	53	104	73	20	9	7	16	26
2015–16	Erie Otters	OHL	60	51	50	101	28	13	8	11	19	13
2016–17	Erie Otters	OHL	63	65	62	127	49	18	13	25	38	10
2017–18	Chicago Blackhawks	NHL	82	28	24	52	6	—	—	—	—	—
2018–19	Chicago Blackhawks	NHL	82	41	35	76	15	—	—	—	—	—
2019–20	Chicago Blackhawks	NHL	70	18	27	45	15	9	2	4	6	9
2020–21	Chicago Blackhawks	NHL	52	32	24	56	12	—	—	—	—	—
2021–22	Chicago Blackhawks	NHL	82	41	37	78	19	—	—	—	—	—
2022–23	Ottawa Senators	NHL	82	27	39	66	45	—	—	—	—	—
2023–24	Detroit Red Wings	NHL	82	27	40	67	34	—	—	—	—	—
2024–25	Detroit Red Wings	NHL	82	39	31	70	29	—	—	—	—	—
2025–26	Detroit Red Wings	NHL	82	41	44	85	19	—	—	—	—	—
NHL totals			696	294	301	595	194	9	2	4	6	9

=== International ===
Year	Team	Event	Result	GP	G	A	Pts	PIM
2016	United States	WJC	3rd place, bronze medalist(s)	5	1	0	1	25
2018	United States	WC	3rd place, bronze medalist(s)	10	1	8	9	0
2019	United States	WC	7th	8	7	2	9	4
Junior totals				5	1	0	1	25
Senior totals				18	8	10	18	4

== Awards and honors ==
Award	Year	Ref.
OHL / CHL
Emms Family Award	2015	
OHL All-Rookie Team	2015	
CHL Rookie of the Year	2015	
OHL Second All-Star Team	2015	
CHL/NHL Top Prospects Game	2016	
OHL Third All-Star Team	2016	
Eddie Powers Memorial Trophy	2017	
Jim Mahon Memorial Trophy	2017	
Red Tilson Trophy	2017	
CHL Player of the Year	2017	
OHL First All-Star Team	2017	
Memorial Cup All-Star Team	2017	
NHL
NHL All-Star Game	2022, 2024	
