= Darren Raddysh =

Canadian ice hockey player (born 1996)

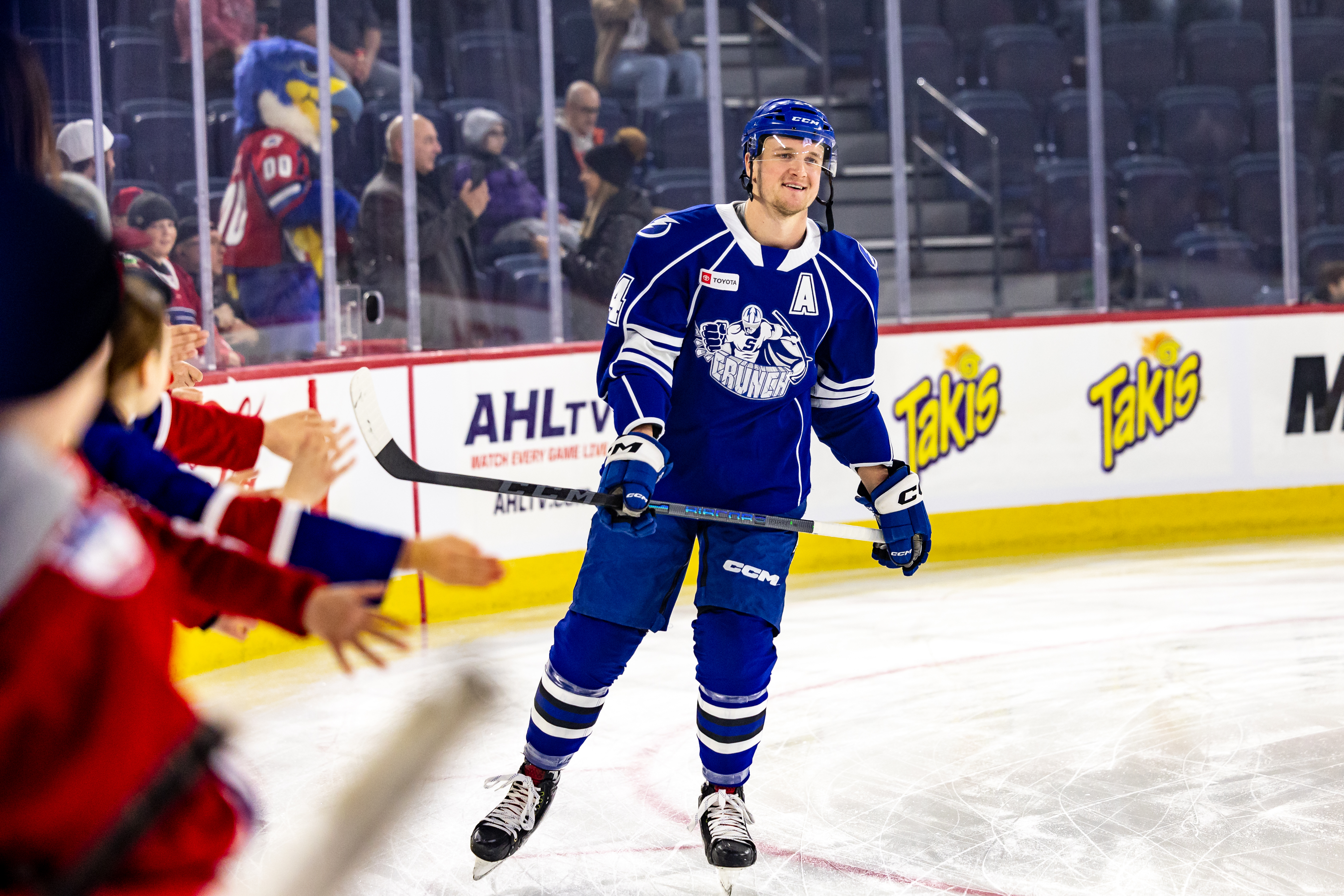
- Raddysh with the Syracuse Crunch in February 2023
- Born: February 28, 1996 (age 30) Caledon, Ontario, Canada
- Height: 6 ft 1 in (185 cm)
- Weight: 200 lb (91 kg; 14 st 4 lb)
- Position: Defence
- Shoots: Right
- NHL team Former teams: Toronto Maple Leafs; Tampa Bay Lightning
- NHL draft: Undrafted
- Playing career: 2017–present

Darren Raddysh (born February 28, 1996) is a Canadian professional ice hockey player who is a defenceman for the Toronto Maple Leafs of the National Hockey League (NHL).

== Early life ==
Raddysh was born on February 28, 1996, in Caledon, Ontario to warehouse manager Dwayne and accountant Gwen Raddysh. Growing up in Toronto with his brother Taylor, who also plays in the NHL, their father bought them rollerblades to practice shooting and skating at home. As the two were a few years apart, they played competitive lacrosse on the same teams and golfed together at the Caledon Country Club.

== Playing career ==
=== Youth ===
Raddysh began his minor hockey career with the Toronto Marlboros Minor Midget AAA team, with whom he won the 2009 Silver Stick tournament in Michigan. During his tenure with the team, Raddysh was drafted in the fifth round, 84th overall, by the Erie Otters of the Ontario Hockey League (OHL). At the time of his selection, he stood at 5-foot-11 and weighed 165 pounds. He remained with the Marlboros for the 2012–13 season, during which he earned a call up to the Georgetown Raiders of the Ontario Junior Hockey League for seven games. Raddysh made his OHL debut with the Otters to complete their 2012-13 season, playing in 24 games and recording two assists.

Once Taylor was drafted by the Otters, Raddysh requested that his brother live with him since he had already completed high school. However, the team refused for they wished for Taylor to "not rely solely on his brother for direction." Raddysh remained undrafted during his tenure with the Otters but received invitations to training camps from the Los Angeles Kings and San Jose Sharks.

Raddysh re-joined the Otters for his fifth and final year in major juniors and recorded a comeback season, gaining attention from various NHL teams. Following a game against the Kitchener Rangers in January, Raddysh became the new franchise leader for points by a defenceman with 151. The following month, he set a new franchise single-season record for points by a defenceman with his 68th of the season. With his assistance, the Otters won the J. Ross Robertson Cup as the playoff champion of the Ontario Hockey League and qualified for the 2017 Memorial Cup. Alongside his brother Taylor, they became the first pair of brothers to compete against another pair of brothers (the McLeod's) in an OHL Final since 2012. As a result of his play, Raddysh became the first player in OHL history to simultaneously win the Max Kaminsky Trophy as OHL Defenceman of the Year and the Leo Lalonde Memorial Trophy as Overage Player of the Year. The Otters competed against the Windsor Spitfires in the Memorial Cup, losing in seven games. At the end of the tournament, Raddysh was named to the 2017 Mastercard Memorial Cup All-Star Team alongside his brother.

Raddysh concluded his major junior career on June 20, 2017, by signing a one-year American Hockey League (AHL) contract with the Rockford IceHogs.

=== Professional ===
Raddysh began his professional career with the IceHogs after making their opening night roster prior to the 2017–18 season. He recorded his first professional goal on October 15, during a 5–3 loss to the Milwaukee Admirals. On May 21, 2018, Raddysh signed a two-year contract with the Chicago Blackhawks that ran through the 2019–20 season. On February 18, 2019, Raddysh was traded to the New York Rangers in exchange for Peter Holland. After the trade he was sent to the Rangers' AHL affiliate, The Hartford Wolf Pack where after 22 games he recorded his first goal in their final regular season game against the Hershey Bears.

He attended the Rangers' training camp prior to the 2019–20 season but was reassigned to their AHL affiliate. In July 2020, Raddysh was named to the Rangers' training camp roster, Phase 3 of the NHL's Return to Play.

On July 28, 2021, Raddysh signed a one-year, two-way contract with the Tampa Bay Lightning.

Raddysh made his NHL debut on December 30, 2021 against the Florida Panthers, filling one of the numerous COVID-related vacancies on the Lightning roster. In a 9–3 loss, Raddysh was on the ice for 14 minutes and 57 seconds and recorded his first NHL hit.

Raddysh played in all 82 games for the Lightning during the 2023–24 season with six goals and 27 assists for 33 points recorded but then being held pointless in three games in the Lightning’s first round exit in the 2024 playoffs in five games by the eventual Stanley Cup champion Florida Panthers.

Raddysh recorded six goals and 31 assists for 37 points in 73 games in 2024–25 but once again being held pointless in 2025 playoffs in four games in another five game first round exit by the reigning champion and eventual back-to-back champion Florida Panthers.

Raddysh had a breakout year in offensive production in the 2025–26 season. He posted 22 goals and 48 assists for 70 points in 73 games, nearly doubling his career totals in goals and points in a single season. He set a new Lightning franchise record for goals scored by a defenceman in a single season, surpassing the previous record of 20 held by Dan Boyle in 2006–07 and Victor Hedman in 2021–22. Raddysh also joined Hedman as only the second defenceman in franchise history to score 70 points in a season. During the season, he collected his first career NHL hat trick on January 3, 2026, in a 7–3 win against the San Jose Sharks. He became the third defenceman in Lightning franchise history to score a hat trick, joining Boyle and Doug Crossman. Upon scoring the hat trick, Raddysh achieved a rare statistic with his brother Taylor, who had also scored a hat trick against the Sharks three months earlier, becoming the first pair of brothers in 40 years to score a hat trick against the same team since Marián and Peter Šťastný did so against the Pittsburgh Penguins in 1982.

On June 19, 2026, the Toronto Maple Leafs traded their 2026 fifth-round pick in exchange for Raddysh in a sign-and-trade deal, after Raddysh agreed to an eight-year, $68 million contract.

== Career statistics ==
			Regular season					Playoffs
Season	Team	League	GP	G	A	Pts	PIM	GP	G	A	Pts	PIM
2012–13	Toronto Marlboros	GTHL	19	2	1	3	16	—	—	—	—	—
2012–13	Georgetown Raiders	OJHL	7	0	2	2	0	—	—	—	—	—
2012–13	Erie Otters	OHL	24	0	2	2	2	—	—	—	—	—
2013–14	Erie Otters	OHL	60	3	10	13	27	2	0	0	0	2
2014–15	Erie Otters	OHL	60	14	34	48	38	20	2	7	9	18
2015–16	Erie Otters	OHL	66	8	32	40	80	13	4	5	9	8
2016–17	Erie Otters	OHL	62	16	65	81	63	22	8	14	22	14
2017–18	Rockford IceHogs	AHL	66	5	17	22	26	9	0	2	2	4
2018–19	Rockford IceHogs	AHL	54	8	18	26	20	—	—	—	—	—
2018–19	Hartford Wolf Pack	AHL	22	1	3	4	16	—	—	—	—	—
2019–20	Hartford Wolf Pack	AHL	62	6	22	28	33	—	—	—	—	—
2020–21	Hartford Wolf Pack	AHL	24	2	13	15	12	—	—	—	—	—
2021–22	Syracuse Crunch	AHL	61	7	18	25	40	5	0	2	2	2
2021–22	Tampa Bay Lightning	NHL	4	0	0	0	0	—	—	—	—	—
2022–23	Syracuse Crunch	AHL	50	13	38	51	40	—	—	—	—	—
2022–23	Tampa Bay Lightning	NHL	17	1	2	3	4	6	1	1	2	2
2023–24	Tampa Bay Lightning	NHL	82	6	27	33	21	3	0	0	0	0
2024–25	Tampa Bay Lightning	NHL	73	6	31	37	14	4	0	0	0	0
2025–26	Tampa Bay Lightning	NHL	73	22	48	70	72	7	1	1	2	6
NHL totals			249	35	108	143	111	20	2	2	4	8
