= Ryan Strome =

Canadian ice hockey player (born 1993)

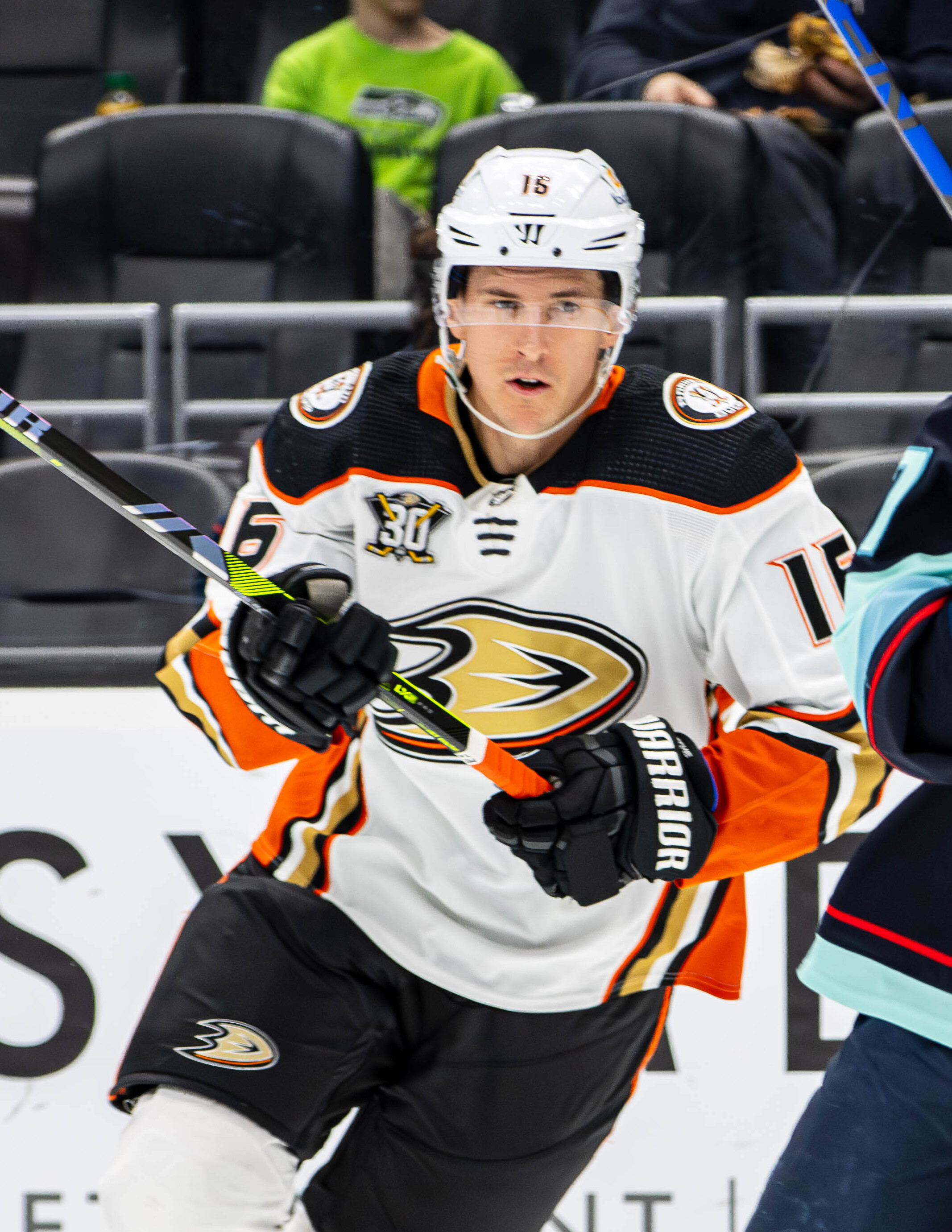
- Strome with the Anaheim Ducks in 2024
- Born: July 11, 1993 (age 33) Mississauga, Ontario, Canada
- Height: 6 ft 1 in (185 cm)
- Weight: 192 lb (87 kg; 13 st 10 lb)
- Position: Centre
- Shoots: Right
- NHL team Former teams: Calgary Flames; New York Islanders; Edmonton Oilers; New York Rangers; Anaheim Ducks
- NHL draft: 5th overall, 2011; New York Islanders
- Playing career: 2013–present

Ryan Edward Gaston Strome (born July 11, 1993) is a Canadian ice hockey player who is a centre for the Calgary Flames of the National Hockey League (NHL). He was selected fifth overall in the 2011 NHL entry draft by the New York Islanders and began playing with the team during their 2013–14 season. Previously, Strome played in the major junior level as a member of the Barrie Colts of the Ontario Hockey League (OHL) before being traded to the Niagara IceDogs during his first season in the league. He is the brother of Washington Capitals forward Dylan Strome and Hershey Bears forward Matthew Strome.

== Playing career ==
=== Amateur ===
Strome played his minor hockey with the Toronto Marlboros of the Greater Toronto Hockey League (GTHL) during the 2008–09 season. At the Ontario Hockey League's (OHL) 2009 Priority Selection, he was selected eighth overall by the Barrie Colts. During the 2009–10 season, he was traded to the Niagara IceDogs. The IceDogs qualified for the playoffs, but were eliminated in the first round, while the Colts would go on to the OHL Championship Finals. They were eliminated in four (4) games. During the following season, Strome compiled 106 points in just 65 games. He was named "OHL Player of the Month" in January 2011 and selected to the Second All-Star Team at years end.

=== Professional ===
==== New York Islanders ====
After his second season with the IceDogs, Strome became eligible for the National Hockey League (NHL) Entry Draft. He was selected in the first round, fifth overall, in the 2011 draft by the New York Islanders. He was also selected by the Kontinental Hockey League's Amur Khabarovsk in their 2011 draft. After being drafted, Strome spent another season with the IceDogs before joining the Islanders' American Hockey League (AHL) minor league affiliate, the Bridgeport Sound Tigers in the 2012–13 season. Halfway through the following season, on December 11, 2013, he was called up to the Islanders after the team had put Pierre-Marc Bouchard on waivers to make room on their roster. Before his call-up, he was leading the AHL in points through the first 23 games of the season. Strome scored his first NHL goal on January 6, 2014, against Kari Lehtonen of the Dallas Stars.

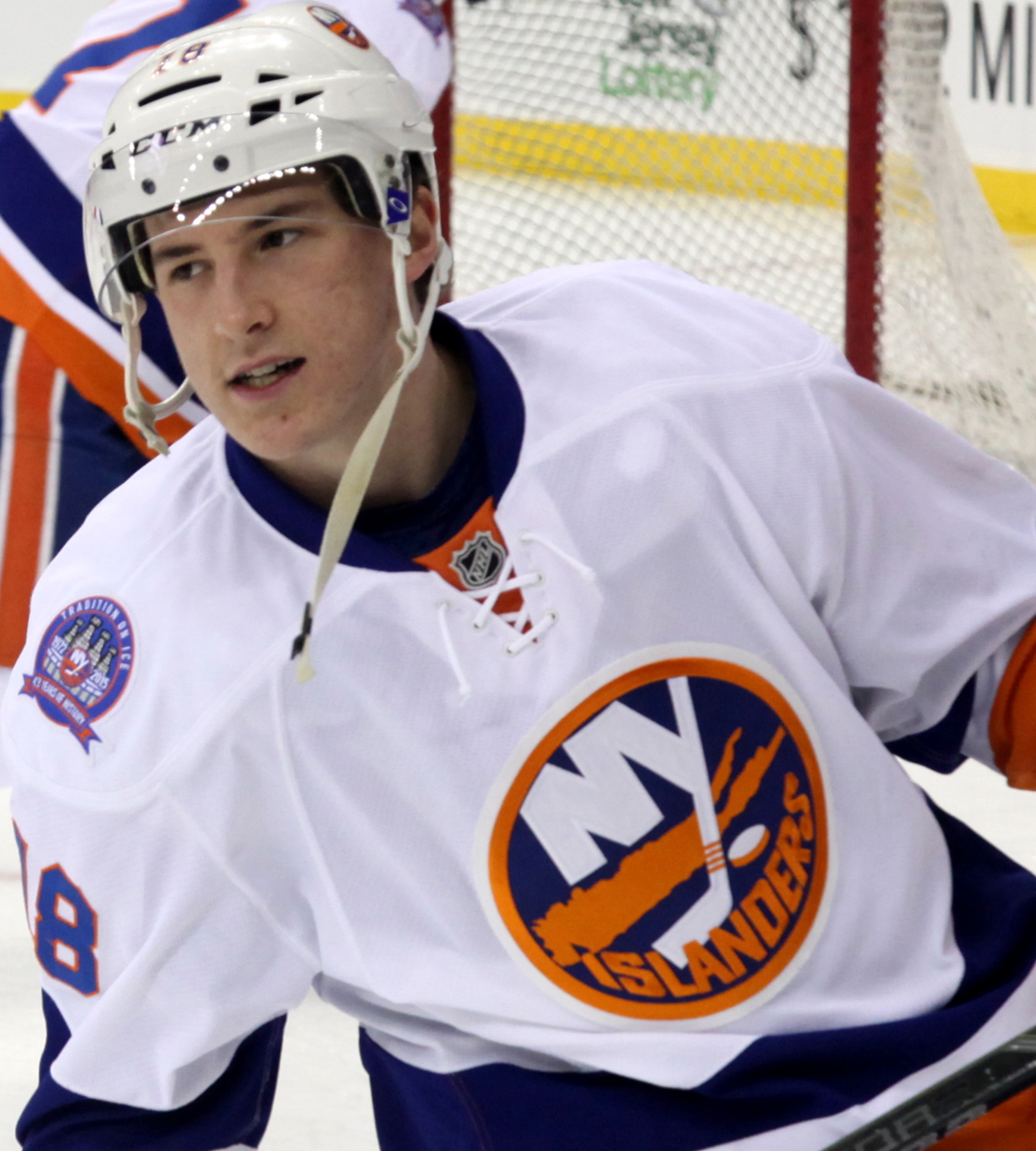
Strome with the New York Islanders during the 2014–15 season.

==== Edmonton Oilers ====
On June 22, 2017, Strome was traded by the Islanders to the Edmonton Oilers in exchange for forward Jordan Eberle. Following the trade, Oilers coach Todd McLellan praised Strome's versatility and ability to play many roles on the ice. Prior to the start of the 2017–18 season, Strome was expected to play on Connor McDavid's right wing or be the second- or third-line center. As the month of October continued, Strome often played on the right wing of the second line with Ryan Nugent-Hopkins and Milan Lucic. By the end of October, Strome had tallied four goals and seven assists for 11 points through his first 24 games. He also spent some time on a new line with Leon Draisaitl and Drake Caggiula. While playing on this line, Strome tallied the Oilers 10,000th goal in team history during their 5–3 win over the San Jose Sharks on December 18. His production eventually slowed down and he became a mainstay on the Oilers third line between Jujhar Khaira and Michael Cammalleri. By January 19, Strome had accumulated seven goals and 10 assists for 17 points through 46 games. However, due to an injury to Nugent-Hopkins, Strome began to earn more time on the Oiler's power-play unit. After going pointless through 11 games, Strome accumulated five assists in three games and became a mainstay on the Oiler's top power-play unit. Later in February, he also snapped a 21-game goalless drought by scoring the game-winning goal in a 4–2 victory over the Colorado Avalanche. This subsequently sparked a six-game point streak. He also saw increased time on the Oiler's penalty killing unit, which ranked amongst the league's best while on the road. Despite his efforts, the Oilers were eliminated from playoff contention on March 22, 2018. Strome finished the season recording 13 goals and 21 assists for 34 points through 82 games. As a restricted free agent in the off-season, Strome agreed to two-year, $6.2 million extension with the Oilers on July 6, 2018.

==== New York Rangers ====
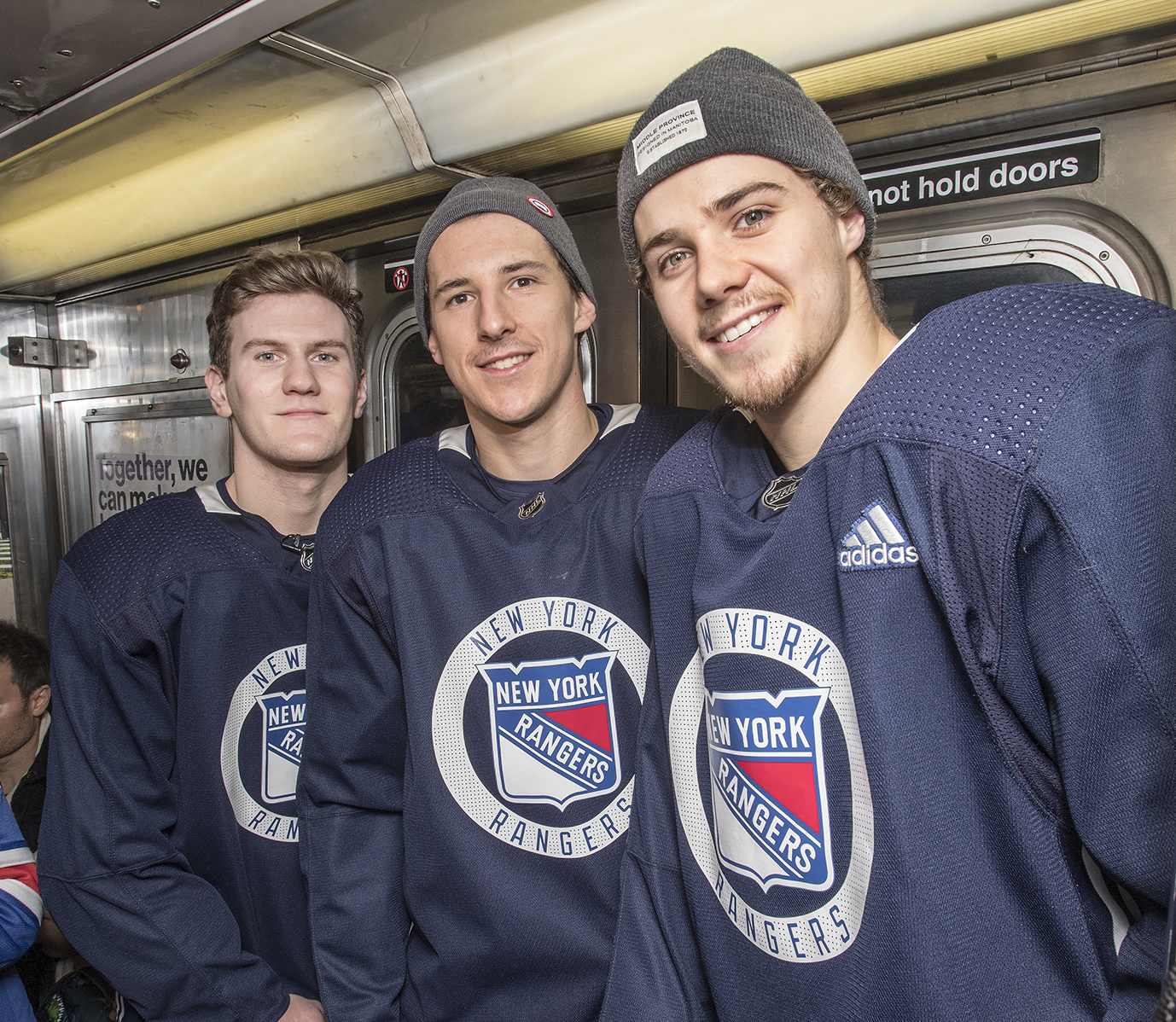
Strome (middle) with Adam Fox (left) and Brett Howden (right) in 2019

On November 16, 2018, Strome was traded by the Oilers to the New York Rangers in exchange for forward Ryan Spooner. At the time of the trade, he had tallied one goal and one assist through 18 games. Strome had found out about the trade as he was boarding the Oilers' plane for a road trip. Upon joining the team, he made an immediate impact as he quickly began accumulating points. As a result, Strome earned some time on the Rangers' top line in late November. By the end of December, Strome had registered three goals and five assists for eight points through 20 games as a member of the Rangers. After scoring his fourth goal of the season in early January, he tied for third on the Rangers in goals and fifth in points. In his 400th career NHL game on February 23, Strome also posted the fifth multi-goal game of his NHL career. At the time, he had also accumulated three goals and four assists in six of the Rangers' last seven games. By March 13, Strome ranked third on the team in goals with 12 and fifth on the team with 24 points. On March 23, he tallied his first career overtime goal to lift the Rangers to a win over the Toronto Maple Leafs. Although the Rangers were shortly thereafter eliminated from playoff contention, Strome helped them win consecutive games for the first time since January 17 by tallying a goal and an assist in a win over the Philadelphia Flyers on March 31. Strome finished the season with 18 goals and 15 assists for 33 points through 63 games with the Rangers. He subsequently became the first NHL player to tally 18 goals with his new team after being acquired during the 2018–19 season. Strome also became one of two Rangers who skated in all of the team's 63 games from the time he was acquired until the end of the season.

Despite the shortened 2019–20 season, Strome set new career highs in assists and points through 70 games. Strome began the season strong, earning top playing minutes with linemate Artemi Panarin after Mika Zibanejad suffered an upper-body injury. Through their first nine games together, Strome and Panarin combined for 24 points to lead the team in goals, assist, and overall points. This continued into late December and Strome quickly accumulated the second-highest points total on the team with 10 goals and 25 assists for 35 points. By January 7, Strome had recorded six points through four games to tie for 22nd in the NHL in assists and ninth in primary assists. As linemates, Strome maintained an eight-game point streak throughout February while Panarin maintained nine games. When the NHL paused play due to the COVID-19 pandemic, Strome finished with a new career-high 59 points through 70 games. His plus-21 rating ranked third on the Rangers and his 41 even-strength points are third behind Panarin and Zibanejad.

Strome with the Flames in 2026

On November 6, 2020, Strome signed a two-year, $9 million contract with the Rangers. On February 20, 2021, Strome became the first player in NHL history to record at least 100 points with both the Islanders and Rangers franchises.

==== Anaheim Ducks ====
Following his fourth season within the Rangers organization, Strome left as a free agent and was signed to a five-year, $25 million contract by the Anaheim Ducks on July 13, 2022. Beyond Strome, the Ducks also signed Frank Vatrano and the two were expected to play on the second forward line. He also played on the Ducks' power play unit once the 2022–23 season began although the unit struggled to produce. Despite failing to produce on the powerplay, Strome maintained a five-game point streak to begin the season, tallying one goal and eight assists over that stretch. By December 3, Strome ranked fourth on the team in goals with six.

==== Calgary Flames ====
On March 6, 2026, Strome was traded to the Calgary Flames in exchange for a 2027 seventh-round pick.

== Personal life ==
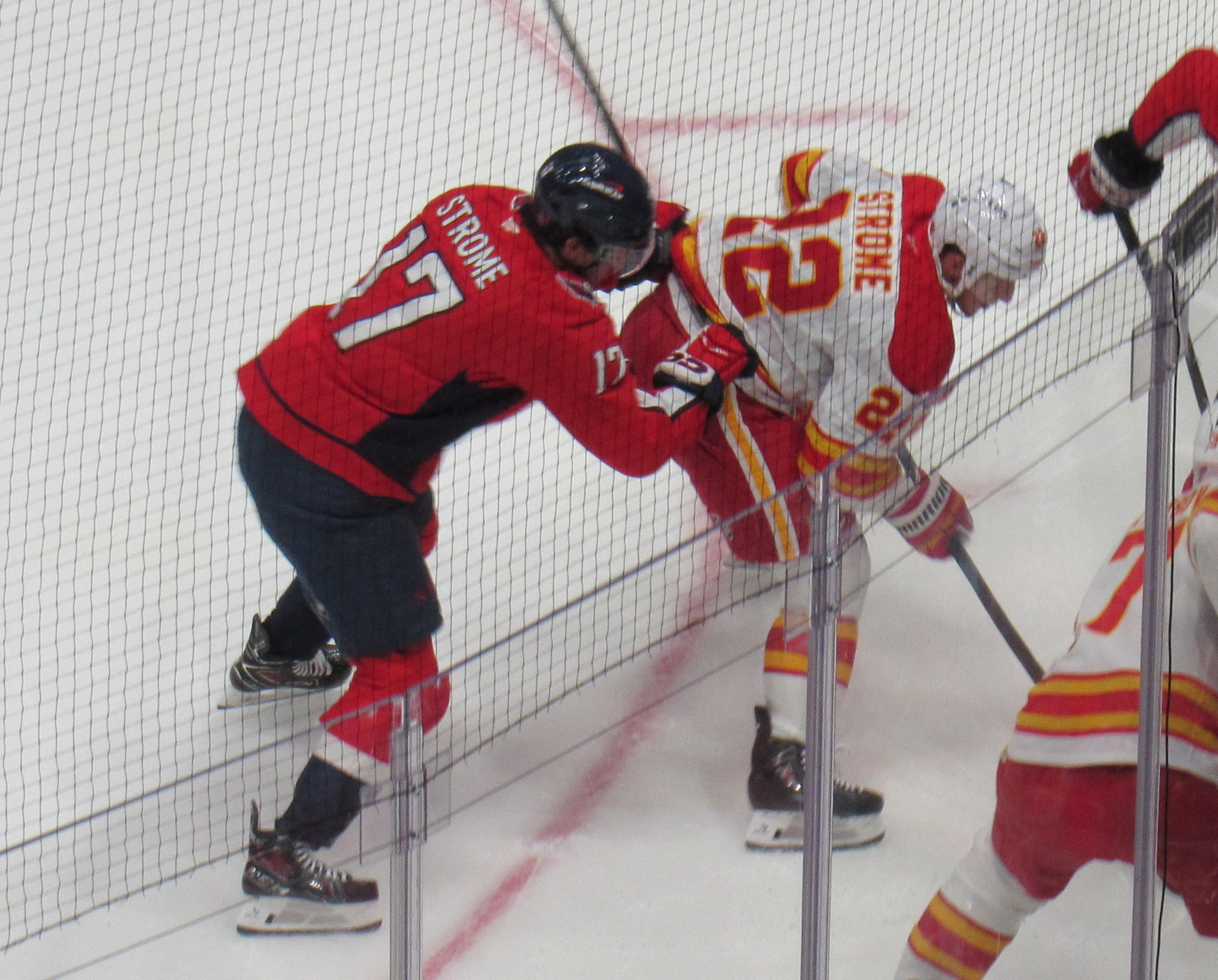
Strome (right) and his brother Dylan (left) battle for position during a game in 2026

Strome has two brothers who also play hockey, Dylan and Matthew. Dylan currently plays in the National Hockey League with the Washington Capitals organization. The youngest brother Matthew was drafted by the Philadelphia Flyers in 2017, and currently plays on the American Hockey League's Hershey Bears. The Strome family had been dubbed as the future Sutters and Staals, families where multiple siblings have gone on to successful ice hockey careers. The Strome brothers grew up in the Lorne Park area of Mississauga.

== Career statistics ==
=== Regular season and playoffs ===
			Regular season					Playoffs
Season	Team	League	GP	G	A	Pts	PIM	GP	G	A	Pts	PIM
2008–09	Toronto Marlboros	GTHL	76	85	79	164	86	—	—	—	—	—
2009–10	Barrie Colts	OHL	34	5	9	14	35	—	—	—	—	—
2009–10	Niagara IceDogs	OHL	27	3	10	13	26	5	0	3	3	0
2010–11	Niagara IceDogs	OHL	65	33	73	106	82	14	6	6	12	19
2011–12	Niagara IceDogs	OHL	46	30	38	68	47	20	7	16	24	31
2012–13	Niagara IceDogs	OHL	53	34	60	94	59	5	2	1	3	8
2012–13	Bridgeport Sound Tigers	AHL	10	2	5	7	4	—	—	—	—	—
2013–14	Bridgeport Sound Tigers	AHL	37	13	36	49	41	—	—	—	—	—
2013–14	New York Islanders	NHL	37	7	11	18	8	—	—	—	—	—
2014–15	New York Islanders	NHL	81	17	33	50	47	7	2	2	4	2
2015–16	New York Islanders	NHL	71	8	20	28	28	8	1	3	4	2
2015–16	Bridgeport Sound Tigers	AHL	8	2	2	4	10	—	—	—	—	—
2016–17	New York Islanders	NHL	69	13	17	30	40	—	—	—	—	—
2017–18	Edmonton Oilers	NHL	82	13	21	34	33	—	—	—	—	—
2018–19	Edmonton Oilers	NHL	18	1	1	2	14	—	—	—	—	—
2018–19	New York Rangers	NHL	63	18	15	33	50	—	—	—	—	—
2019–20	New York Rangers	NHL	70	18	41	59	48	3	0	2	2	7
2020–21	New York Rangers	NHL	56	14	35	49	39	—	—	—	—	—
2021–22	New York Rangers	NHL	74	21	33	54	69	19	2	7	9	10
2022–23	Anaheim Ducks	NHL	82	15	26	41	79	—	—	—	—	—
2023–24	Anaheim Ducks	NHL	79	11	30	41	86	—	—	—	—	—
2024–25	Anaheim Ducks	NHL	82	10	31	41	70	—	—	—	—	—
2025–26	Anaheim Ducks	NHL	33	3	6	9	27	—	—	—	—	—
2025–26	Calgary Flames	NHL	19	5	7	12	8	—	—	—	—	—
NHL totals			916	174	327	501	646	37	5	14	19	21

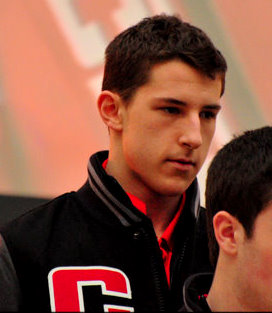
- Strome at the 2012 World Junior Championships

Medal record

Representing Canada

Ice hockey

World Junior Championships
Bronze medal – third place	2012 Canada	

=== International ===
Year	Team	Event	Result	GP	G	A	Pts	PIM
2010	Canada	U17	2nd place, silver medalist(s)	6	2	1	3	4
2012	Canada	WJC	3rd place, bronze medalist(s)	6	3	6	9	8
2013	Canada	WJC	4th	6	4	2	6	10
Junior totals				18	9	9	18	22

== Awards and honours ==
Award	Year
OHL
Second All-Star Team	2010–11
AHL
All-Rookie Team	2013–14

Awards and achievements
Preceded by Brock Nelson	New York Islanders first round pick 2011	Succeeded by Griffin Reinhart
