= Frank Smith (ice hockey) =

Canadian ice hockey administrator

- Born: June 1, 1894; Chatham-Kent, Ontario, Canada
- Died: June 11, 1964 (aged 70); Toronto, Ontario
- Occupation: Ice hockey administrator

Frank Donald Smith (June 1, 1894 – June 11, 1964) was a Canadian ice hockey administrator. He is recognized for contributing to the organization of the Beaches Hockey League, which eventually became the Greater Toronto Hockey League, the largest minor league hockey organization in the world. He was elected to the Hockey Hall of Fame in 1962 in the "Builder" category.

Smith was born in Chatham, Ontario.
