= Logan Stanley =

Canadian ice hockey player (born 1998)

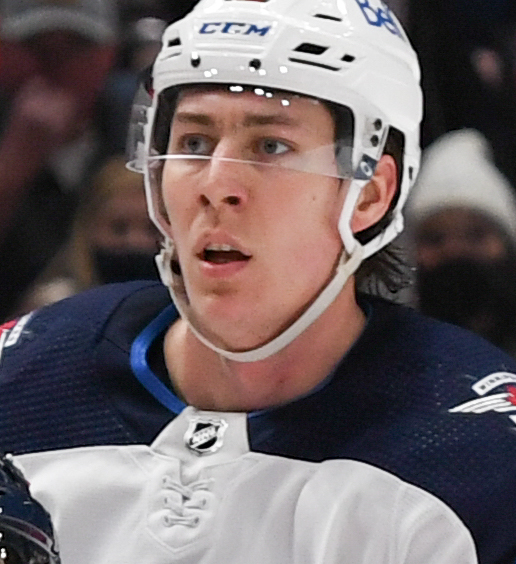
- Stanley with the Winnipeg Jets in 2022
- Born: May 26, 1998 (age 28) Kitchener, Ontario, Canada
- Height: 6 ft 7 in (201 cm)
- Weight: 231 lb (105 kg; 16 st 7 lb)
- Position: Defence
- Shoots: Left
- NHL team Former teams: New York Islanders; Winnipeg Jets; Buffalo Sabres
- NHL draft: 18th overall, 2016; Winnipeg Jets
- Playing career: 2018–present

Logan Stanley (born May 26, 1998) is a Canadian professional ice hockey player who is defenceman for the New York Islanders of the National Hockey League (NHL). He was selected 18th overall by the Winnipeg Jets in the 2016 NHL entry draft.

== Playing career ==
Stanley played as a youth with the Waterloo Wolves in the AHMMPL, before he was selected in the first round, 12th overall in the 2014 OHL Priority draft by the Windsor Spitfires. On May 9, 2014, Stanley committed to the Spitfires of the OHL to play under Bob Boughner. Stanley has also been involved with IIHF tournaments and development camps.

On December 7, 2016, Stanley was signed to a three-year, entry-level contract with the Winnipeg Jets.

During the 2016–17 season, Stanley injured his knee in January and did not return to the lineup until April. On May 28, 2017, Stanley won the Memorial Cup championship with the Windsor Spitfires.

On August 8, 2017, Stanley was traded to the Kitchener Rangers. Despite his trade, Stanley was awarded the Scott Miller Extra Mile Award by the Spitfires at the end of the season.

Due to his success, Stanley was invited to the Winnipeg Jets training camp before the 2017–18 NHL season, however, he failed to make the roster and was sent back to the OHL. During the 2017–18 OHL season, Stanley received a two-game suspension for head-checking Akil Thomas during a game against the Niagara IceDogs. The Jets assigned Stanley to the Manitoba Moose after the Rangers were eliminated from the 2018 OHL playoffs.

After attending the Jets 2018 training camp, Stanley was reassigned to the Manitoba Moose to begin his first professional season. After finally cracking the Jets lineup for the 2020–21 NHL season, Stanley achieved a couple of career milestones in his rookie season; he had his first career fight on March 24, 2021, against Zack MacEwen of the Vancouver Canucks, and would later score his first NHL goal on March 27, scoring on David Rittich of the Calgary Flames in a 4–2 Jets loss.

On August 4, 2021, the Jets re-signed Stanley to a two-year, $1.8 million contract.

On August 19, 2023, the Jets re-signed Stanley to a one-year, $1 million contract.

On July 6, 2024, the Jets re-signed Stanley to a two-year, $2.5 million contract.

On March 6, 2026, Stanley was traded to the Buffalo Sabres alongside Luke Schenn, in exchange for Jacob Bryson, Isak Rosen, a conditional 2026 fourth-round pick, and a 2027 second-round pick.

On September 27, 2026, Stanley signed a one-year contract with the New York Islanders. With his usual #64 being taken by Calum Ritchie, Stanley decided to wear #8 for the Islanders.

== International play ==
Stanley played for Team Canada in the 2016 IIHF World U18 Championships. Stanley was invited to Canada's 2018 World Junior Ice Hockey Championships training camp but was cut before the final roster was announced.

== Personal life ==
Growing up in Waterloo, Ontario, Stanley attended Northlake Woods Elementary School before attending Waterloo Collegiate Institute.

Stanley is a cousin to Michael Latta, a former NHL player for the Washington Capitals.

== Career statistics ==
=== Regular season and playoffs ===
			Regular season					Playoffs
Season	Team	League	GP	G	A	Pts	PIM	GP	G	A	Pts	PIM
2012–13	Waterloo Wolves	AHMMPL	2	0	0	0	0	—	—	—	—	—
2013–14	Waterloo Wolves	AHMMPL	28	8	20	28	95	9	0	5	5	35
2013–14	Waterloo Siskins	GOJHL	—	—	—	—	—	2	1	0	1	0
2014–15	Windsor Spitfires	OHL	59	0	4	4	60	—	—	—	—	—
2015–16	Windsor Spitfires	OHL	64	5	12	17	103	5	1	0	1	16
2016–17	Windsor Spitfires	OHL	35	4	13	17	62	—	—	—	—	—
2017–18	Kitchener Rangers	OHL	61	15	27	42	111	19	4	12	16	20
2018–19	Manitoba Moose	AHL	73	6	16	22	70	—	—	—	—	—
2019–20	Manitoba Moose	AHL	44	3	7	10	73	—	—	—	—	—
2020–21	Winnipeg Jets	NHL	37	1	3	4	26	8	2	1	3	4
2021–22	Winnipeg Jets	NHL	58	1	12	13	44	—	—	—	—	—
2022–23	Winnipeg Jets	NHL	19	1	2	3	21	1	0	0	0	0
2023–24	Winnipeg Jets	NHL	25	1	1	2	36	3	0	1	1	6
2024–25	Winnipeg Jets	NHL	63	1	13	14	78	5	0	0	0	42
2025–26	Winnipeg Jets	NHL	59	9	12	21	99	—	—	—	—	—
2025–26	Buffalo Sabres	NHL	17	0	5	5	29	8	0	0	0	19
NHL totals			278	14	48	62	333	25	2	2	4	71

=== International ===
Year	Team	Event	Result	GP	G	A	Pts	PIM
2014	Canada Red	U17	6th	5	2	0	2	0
2016	Canada	U18	4th	7	0	1	1	12
Junior totals				12	2	1	3	12

Awards and achievements
Preceded by Patrik Laine	Winnipeg Jets first-round draft pick 2016	Succeeded by Kristian Vesalainen
