= Greater Toronto Hockey League =

Ice hockey organization based in Toronto, Ontario

- President: Don West
- Founded: 1911
- No. of teams: 50
- Headquarters: Toronto, Ontario
- Website: https://gthlcanada.com/

The Greater Toronto Hockey League (GTHL), formerly known as the Metro Toronto Hockey League, is a minor level ice hockey organization based in the Greater Toronto Area of Ontario. The league was founded in 1911 as the Beaches Hockey League by Fred C. Waghorne, Sr., and it is the largest minor hockey organization in the world. The league is sanctioned by the Ontario Hockey Federation and Hockey Canada.

== History ==
=== Early years ===
The Greater Toronto Hockey League was founded in 1911 by Frank D. Smith. Its first season consisted of 5 teams and 99 players. Smith was 17 years old when he founded the organization, and would continue to oversee the operation for 50 years. He was elected to the Hockey Hall of Fame in 1962 in part for his contributions to minor hockey in Toronto.

The League's name underwent several changes over its history. Originally called the Beaches League, it was renamed to the Toronto Hockey League (THL) shortly after its inception. It was renamed again in 1972 to the Metropolitan Toronto Hockey League before settling on the current Greater Toronto Hockey League moniker in 1998. The League saw increases in membership during its first few years. During World War I, the then THL maintained its numbers due to having younger age divisions, such as peewee and bantam, where the players were too young to participate in the war. By the 1960s, The league had over 20,000 members on teams across Toronto.

During the summer in 1989, the MTHL and the Ontario Minor Hockey Association (OMHA), broke away from the Ontario Hockey Association (OHA) and formed the Central Canada Hockey Association, due to disagreement with an OHA restructuring proposal which would have limited their voting powers. The dispute ended when the Ontario Hockey Federation (OHF) was established, with equal representation for the OHA, Northern Ontario Hockey Association, MTHL, and OMHA. The OHF was given the mandate to oversee hockey in Ontario, and be a review panel for three years to propose further restructuring if necessary.

=== The GTHL ===
In 2011, the Greater Toronto Hockey League and its affiliates consisted of 2,800 teams and around 40,000 players. It is currently the largest youth ice hockey organization in the world in terms of members. The league has expanded its area of operation over the years from primarily the city of Toronto to many of its surrounding municipalities. Currently, there are 51 separate associations that operate under the GTHL. These associations provide teams for the various age groups and divisions that make up the league. Around 275 GTHL alumni have gone on to play in North American professional ice hockey leagues, such as the National Hockey League and the defunct World Hockey Association.

The GTHL is a not-for-profit organization, however its operating costs are high. In 2011, league expenses were in excess of $9 million per year. The high costs of operating teams has been an issue for the league, with some teams having trouble paying for the increasing costs of ice in the Toronto area. The costs for someone to play on a AAA GTHL team, its highest level of play, is approximately $6,000 per player.

In 2011, the GTHL along with Hockey Canada changed its rules regarding hits to the head. Stricter rules were placed on what constituted a hit to the head, and the severity of punishment for instances of it was increased.

=== Affiliates ===
The GTHL serves as the parent organization for several other minor hockey leagues. These leagues coordinate "Select" League play for players in the Toronto area seeking to play at a level below "rep" teams in the GTHL.

- North York Hockey League (NYHL) - Coordinates "select" level programs for the Toronto, Scarborough and North York area.
- Mississauga Hockey League (MHL) - Coordinates "select" and Rep "A" level programs for the Mississauga area.

== Levels of play ==
The GTHL runs competitive leagues at the "rep" levels (AAA, AA, and A), as well as coordinating several affiliates to operate "Select" leagues throughout the city. Rep hockey in the GTHL begins at "minor Atom" (U9) age and continues through U21. House League and Select programs include children of all ages, extending from Timbits (3 or 4 years of age) all the way to U21.

All hockey is played under "Hockey Canada" rules. There is no body checking allowed at all age groups for "select" and rep "A" level in the GTHL and affiliates. Body checking is permitted for minor bantam (U14) and above for the rep "AA" and rep "AAA" levels.

== Notable alumni ==
- Jim Aldred
- Andreas Athanasiou
- Sam Bennett
- Jordan Binnington
- Dave Bolland
- Carl Brewer
- Connor Brown
- Michael Bunting
- Sean Burke
- Brent Burns
- Mike Cammalleri
- Chris Campoli
- Anson Carter
- Ben Chiarot
- Jakob Chychrun
- Anthony Cirelli
- Casey Cizikas
- Paul Coffey
- Andrew Cogliano
- Lionel Conacher
- Trevor Daley
- Mike Danton
- Jason Dawe
- Jack Devine
- Max Domi
- Kris Draper
- Jamie Drysdale
- Bill Durnan
- Sean Durzi
- Ryan Ellis
- Ray Emery
- MacKenzie Entwistle
- Jake Evans
- Robby Fabbri
- Mario Ferraro
- Warren Foegele
- Alex Formenton
- Mark Friedman
- Sam Gagner
- Batu Gendunov
- Mark Giordano
- Adam Graves
- Dougie Hamilton
- Barrett Hayton
- Orel Hershiser
- Bo Horvat
- Josh Ho-Sang
- Jack Hughes
- Quinn Hughes
- Zach Hyman
- Sheldon Keefe
- Chris Kelly
- Red Kelly
- Greg Kimmerly
- Jordan Kyrou
- Scott Laughton
- Jack LaFontaine
- Brendan Lemieux
- Eric Lindros
- Ryan Lomberg
- Frank Mahovlich
- Andrew Mangiapane
- Mitch Marner
- Shawn Matthias
- Connor McDavid
- Kirk McLean
- Michael McLeod
- Ryan McLeod
- Victor Mete
- Rick Middleton
- Sean Monahan
- Dominic Moore
- Matt Moulson
- Rick Nash
- Darnell Nurse
- Jamie Oleksiak
- Ryan O'Reilly
- Richard Park
- Nick Paul
- Adam Pelech
- Cole Perfetti
- Michael Pezzetta
- Alex Pietrangelo
- Owen Power
- Bob Pulford
- Bill Quackenbush
- Taylor Raddysh
- Mike Ricci
- Brett Ritchie
- Nick Ritchie
- Jason Robertson
- Nick Robertson
- Evan Rodrigues
- Tyler Seguin
- Frank Selke
- Brendan Shanahan
- Steve Shutt
- Wayne Simmonds
- Jeff Skinner
- Brendan Smith
- Gemel Smith
- Givani Smith
- Reilly Smith
- Sid Smith
- Jason Spezza
- Matt Stajan
- Mitchell Stephens
- Chris Stewart
- Dylan Strome
- Ryan Strome
- Malcolm Subban
- PK Subban
- Brandon Tanev
- Chris Tanev
- John Tavares
- Akil Thomas
- Owen Tippett
- Tyler Toffoli
- Philip Tomasino
- Joel Ward
- Dean Warren
- Scott Wedgewood
- Kevin Weekes
- Tom Wilson
- Daniel Winnik
