= Dylan Strome =

Canadian ice hockey player (born 1997)

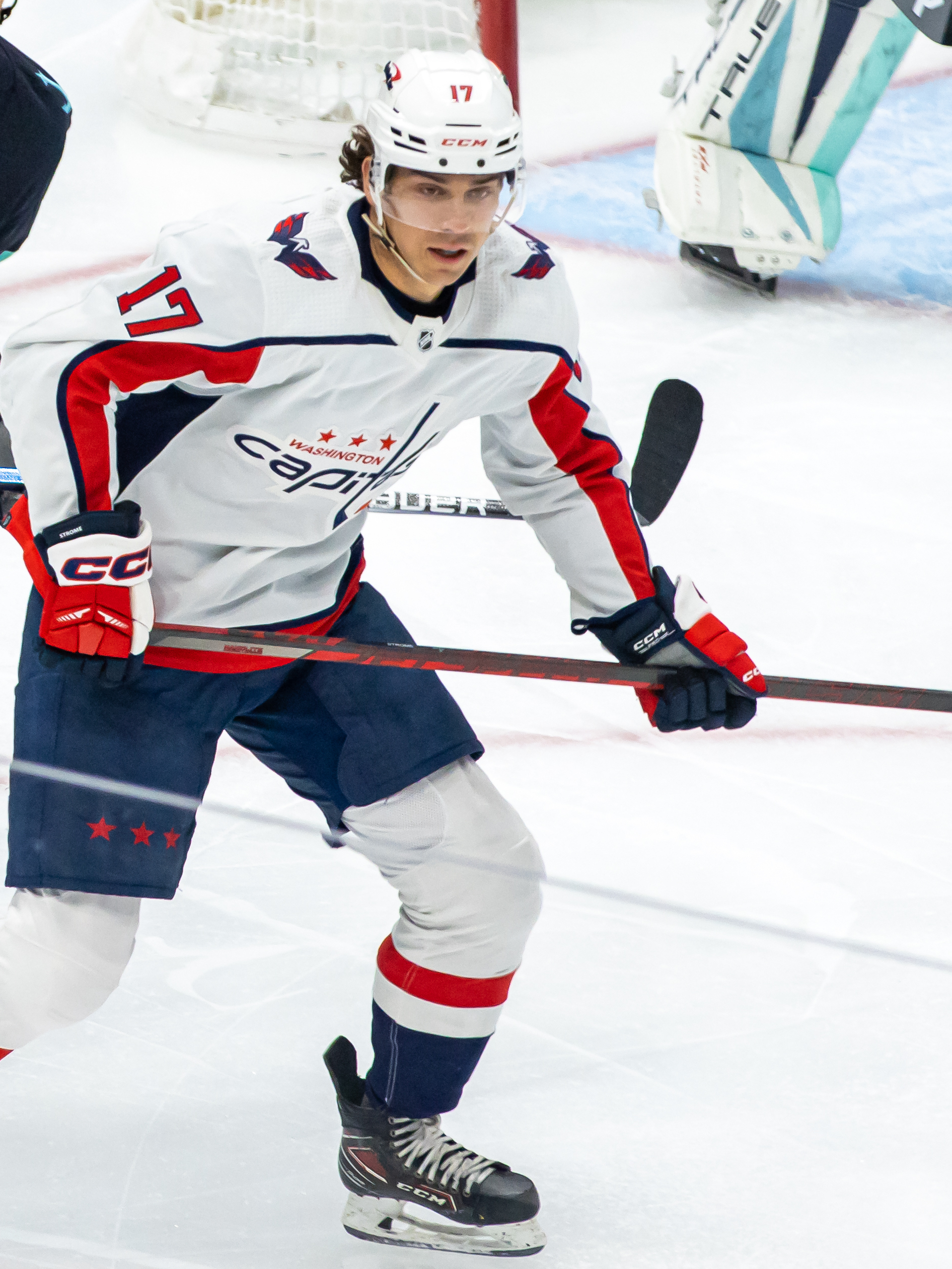
- Strome with the Washington Capitals in 2022
- Born: March 7, 1997 (age 29) Mississauga, Ontario, Canada
- Height: 6 ft 3 in (191 cm)
- Weight: 200 lb (91 kg; 14 st 4 lb)
- Position: Centre
- Shot: Left
- NHL team Former teams: Washington Capitals; Arizona Coyotes; Chicago Blackhawks
- National team: Canada
- NHL draft: 3rd overall, 2015; Arizona Coyotes
- Playing career: 2016–present

Dylan William Strome (born March 7, 1997) is a Canadian professional ice hockey player who is a centre and alternate captain for the Washington Capitals of the National Hockey League (NHL). Ahead of the 2015 NHL entry draft, Strome was considered a top prospect, and was selected third overall by the Arizona Coyotes. He has also played for the Chicago Blackhawks.

== Playing career ==
=== Junior career and NHL draft ===
Strome started to gain attention as a minor midget hockey player with the Toronto Marlboros of the Greater Toronto Hockey League (GTHL), where he was named the league's Player of the Year for the 2012–13 season.

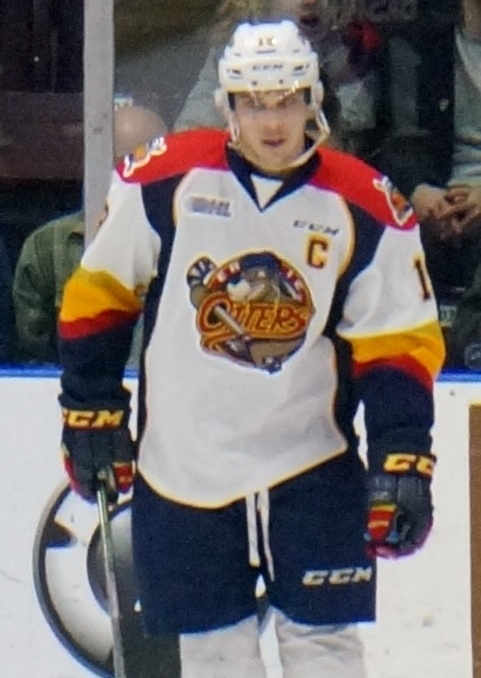
Strome playing with the Erie Otters in February 2017

Strome was drafted second overall by the Ontario Hockey League (OHL)'s Erie Otters in the 2013 OHL Priority Selection, and played with the Otters for four seasons, beginning with the 2013–14 OHL season. On March 25, 2015, Strome won the 2015 OHL scoring title (129 points), narrowly beating-out fellow 2015 NHL entry draft prospect Mitch Marner (126 points). Erie teammate and eventual NHL first overall draft pick Connor McDavid (120 points), who missed 21 games, finished third. Along with winning the scoring title, Strome set the Otters' team record for most points in a single season, narrowly edging former linemate Connor Brown. On May 22, 2017, in the Memorial Cup round robin, Strome scored a tournament single-game record seven points (four goals and three assists), leading the Otters to a 12–5 win over the Saint John Sea Dogs.

Strome was drafted third overall by the Arizona Coyotes in the 2015 NHL entry draft. On July 6, he signed a three-year, entry-level contract with Arizona.

=== Professional (2016–present) ===
==== Arizona Coyotes (2016–2018) ====
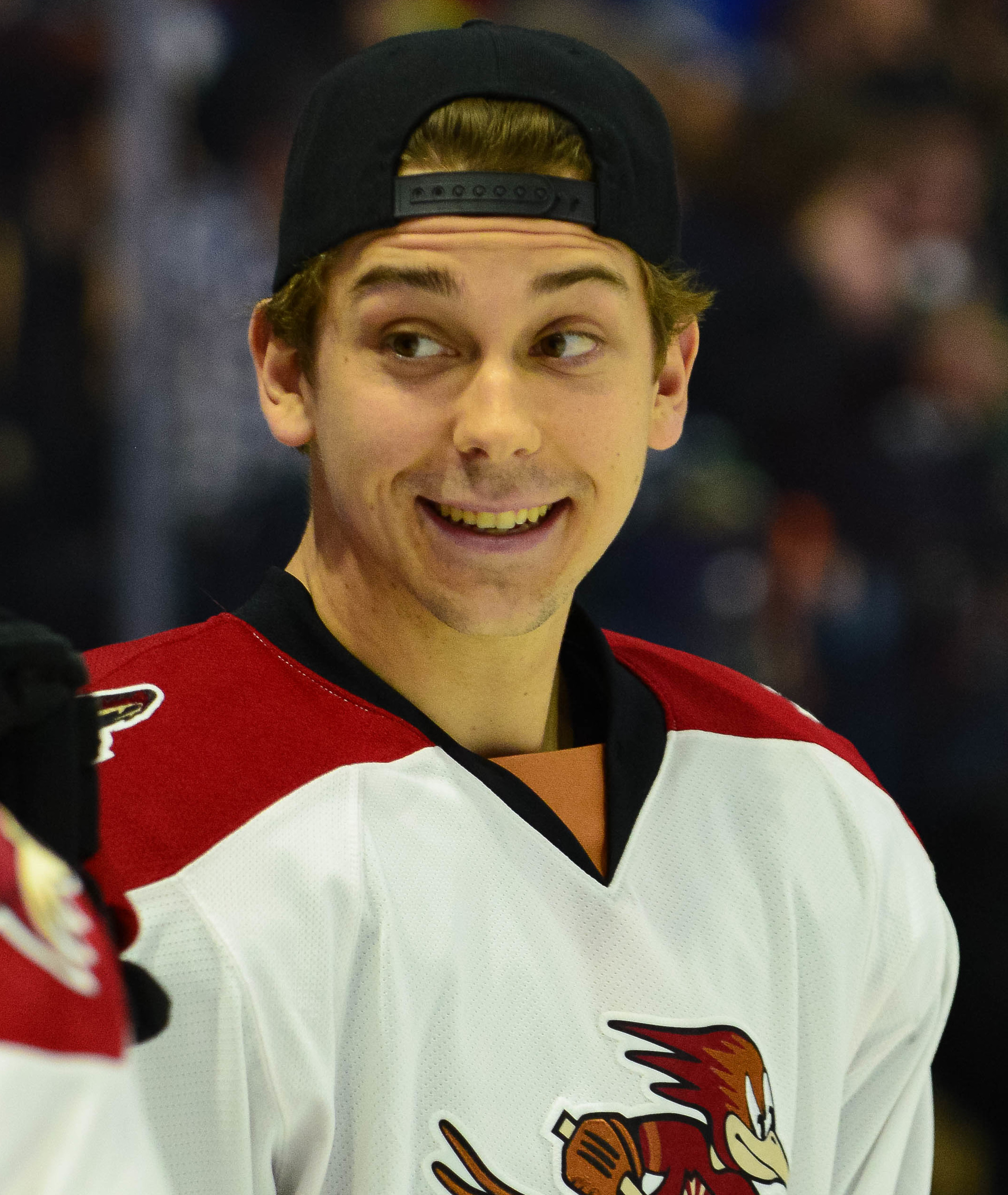
Strome representing the Tucson Roadrunners at the 2018 AHL All-Star Game

In his NHL debut, on October 18, 2016, Strome collected his first NHL point. On November 20, the Coyotes announced Strome would be sent back to the Erie Otters of the OHL.

During the 2017–18 season, Strome made the Coyotes' final roster out of training camp. On October 9, 2017, the Coyotes announced Strome was being sent down to the Coyotes' American Hockey League (AHL) affiliate, the Tucson Roadrunners, after going pointless in two games. However, he was recalled on November 26, after recording a seven-game point streak with the Roadrunners. He scored his first NHL goal on December 2, in a 5–0 win over the New Jersey Devils. Despite this early success, on December 19, Strome was demoted to the AHL after Arizona's acquisition of Josh Archibald from the Pittsburgh Penguins. On January 4, 2018, Strome was selected for the 2018 AHL All-Star Classic Game. Strome was recalled to the NHL on March 20, where he played, and scored, in a game against the Buffalo Sabres on March 21. On April 4, it was announced that Strome was voted in by coaches, media and players to play on the AHL All-Rookie Team. On April 8, after the Coyotes failed to make the 2018 Stanley Cup playoffs, Strome was sent down to the AHL to help the Roadrunners in their Calder Cup playoff run.

Strome's third overall draft selection and lack of NHL success in several seasons with the Coyotes organization had led him acquire frequent derision as a "draft bust". However, his more successful subsequent stints with the Chicago Blackhawks and Washington Capitals have allowed Strome to largely rid himself of this derisive label.

==== Chicago Blackhawks (2018–2022) ====
Strome started the 2018–19 season on the Coyotes' NHL roster. After playing in 20 games, on November 25, 2018, he was traded to the Chicago Blackhawks (along with Brendan Perlini) in exchange for Nick Schmaltz. Strome was placed on the second line with former OHL teammate Alex DeBrincat and Patrick Kane and played on the team's power play unit. On February 11, 2019, Strome was named the Third Star of the Week after recording two goals and five assists in three games to help the Blackhawks win seven games in a row. He finished the season with 17 goals and 34 assists for the Blackhawks. His performance with the Blackhawks was positively regarded, with analysts considering this to be a breakout season in his professional career.

On January 3, 2021, the Blackhawks signed Strome to a two-year, $6 million contract.

Strome was a healthy scratch for seven of the first 11 games of the 2021–22 season. Following the dismissal of coach Jeremy Colliton, Strome rebounded and saw more playtime with the Blackhawks as a top-six forward. He finished the season with 22 goals, 26 assists with 52.3 face off percentage.

As an impending restricted free agent at the conclusion of the season, Strome was not tendered a qualifying offer by the rebuilding Blackhawks, and was released to free agency on July 12, 2022.

==== Washington Capitals (2022–present) ====
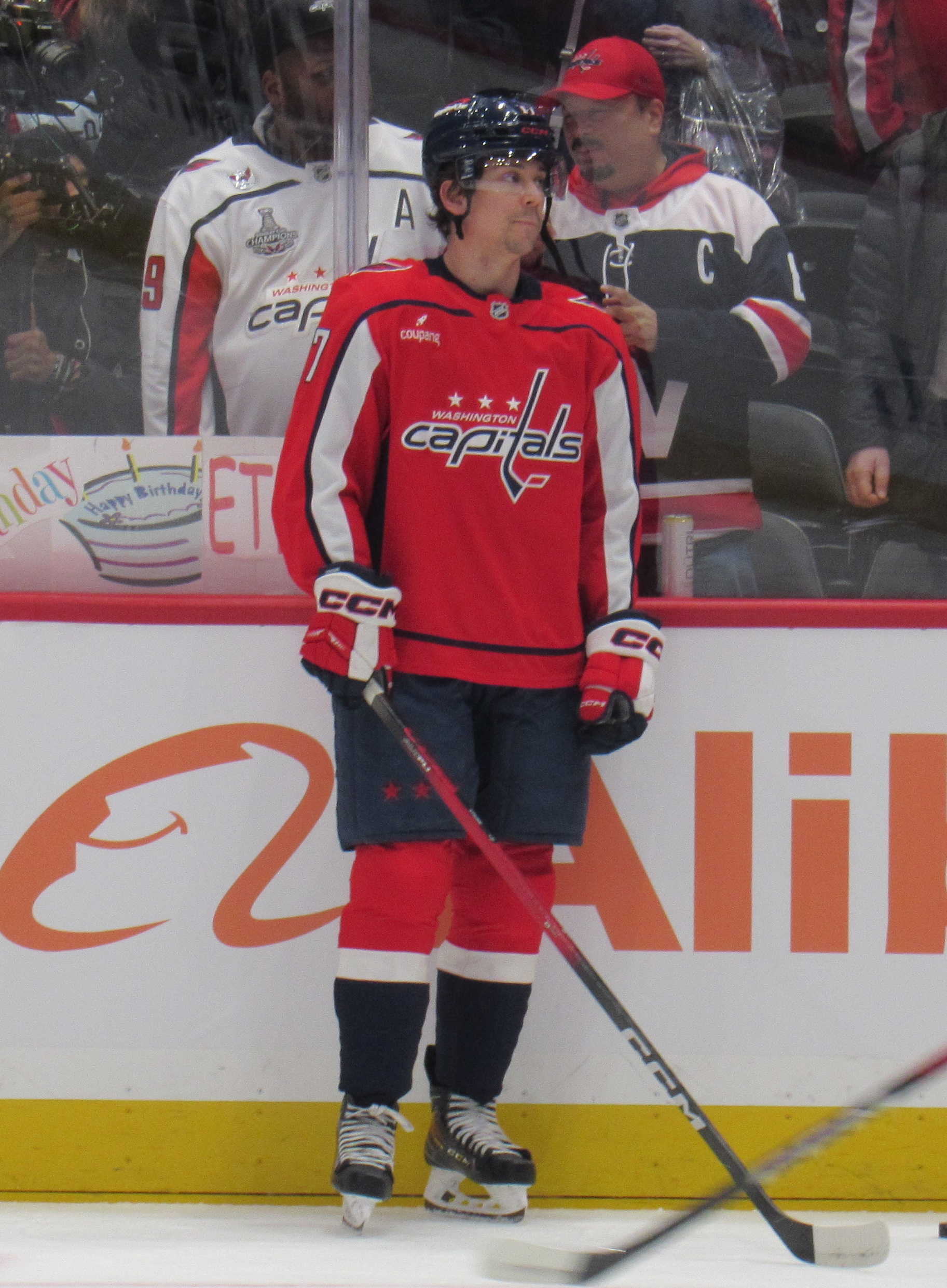
Strome with the Capitals in 2026

On July 14, 2022, Strome signed a one-year, $3.5 million contract with the Washington Capitals. He later signed a five-year, $25 million contract extension with the Capitals on February 3, 2023.

On April 6, 2025, Strome had the secondary assist on Alexander Ovechkin's 895th career regular season goal, which broke Wayne Gretzky's all-time goal-scoring record. In the 2024–25 season, he set new career highs in goals (29), assists (53), and total points (82).

On November 20th, 2025, Strome's wife gave birth to his third daughter during the first period of what would become an 8–4 win over the Montreal Canadiens. During the post-game interview, an emotional Strome praised his wife and shared his regret about not being at the hospital when it happened. Strome had three assists during the game, matching his career high.

== International play ==
Medal record

Men's ice hockey

Representing Canada

World Championships
Silver medal – second place	2019 Slovakia	

World Junior Championships
Silver medal – second place	2017 Canada	

As a 16-year-old, Strome competed as a member of Canada Ontario at the 2014 World U-17 Hockey Challenge, where he was recognized for his outstanding performance when he was named to the tournament's All-Star Team.

Strome went on to play for Canada at the 2014 Ivan Hlinka Memorial Tournament, winning a gold medal.

At the 2016 IIHF World Junior Championships held in Helsinki, Strome and Mitch Marner each scored four goals and two assists in five games to lead the Canadian team in scoring. Canada reached the quarter-finals but was eliminated by Finland.

Strome returned to the 2017 World Junior Ice Hockey Championships held in Toronto and Montreal, where he captained Canada to a silver medal finish.

On April 29, 2019, Strome was named to the Team Canada roster for the 2019 IIHF World Championship. He helped Canada progress through to the playoff rounds before losing the final to Finland and finishing with the silver medal on May 26, 2019. Strome finished the tournament with 1 goal and 5 points in 10 games.

== Personal life ==
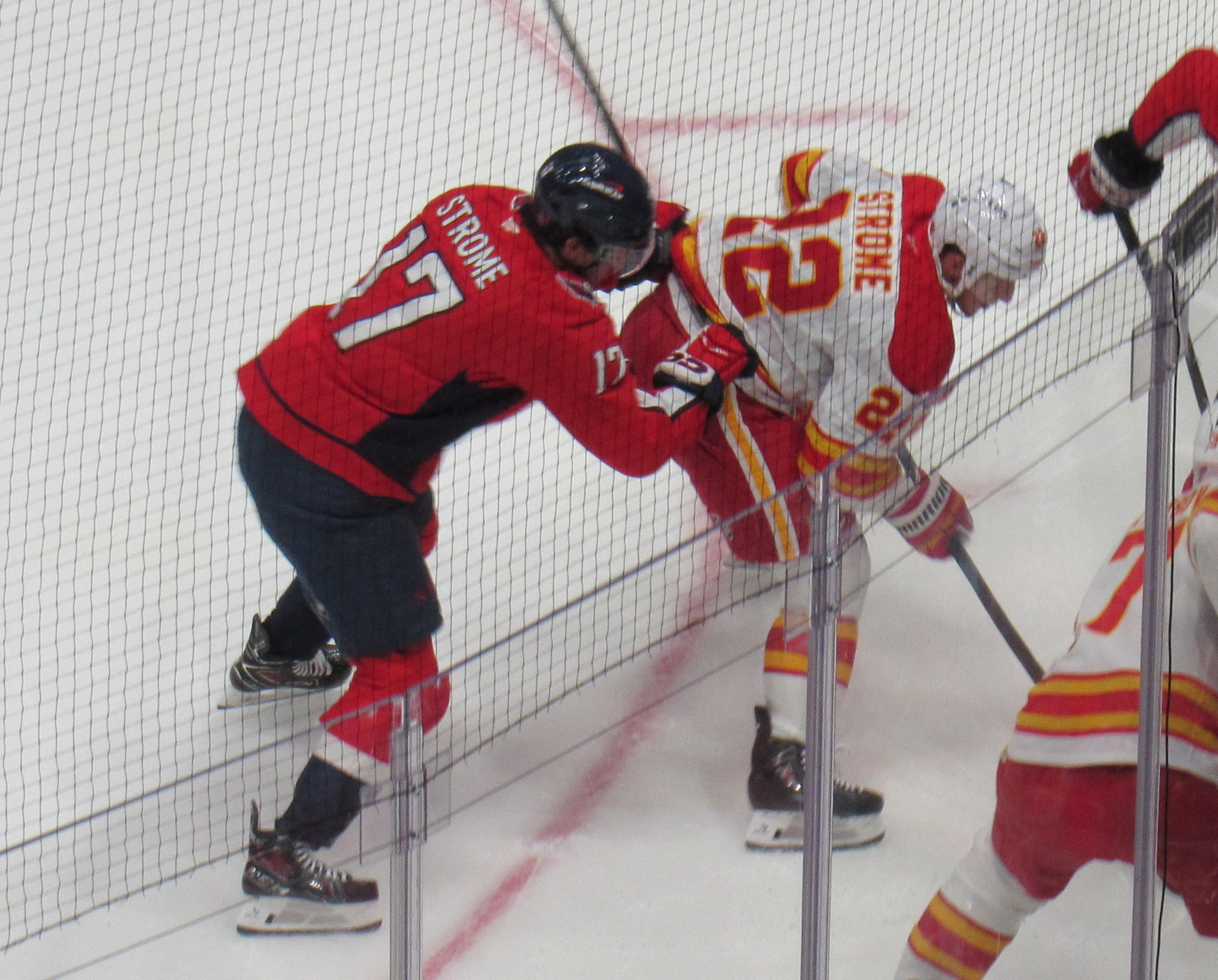
Strome (left) and his brother Ryan (right) battle for position during a game in 2026

Strome is the younger brother of Calgary Flames centre Ryan Strome and the older brother of Washington Capitals prospect Matthew Strome. The Strome brothers grew up in the Lorne Park neighbourhood of Mississauga, Ontario.

Strome and his wife, Tayler Strome (née McMahon) have three daughters together. Their eldest daughter was born in 2021. The Stromes wed in August 2022. Their second daughter was born in 2023. Their third daughter was born in 2025. To help explain to their daughters why Strome travels out of town for away games, the Stromes created a custom illustrated children's book titled "Daddy Goes to Work" that features a story explaining what Strome does for work, accompanied by illustrations and photographs of him playing hockey. After Tayler Strome shared images of their daughters reading the book in Instagram, other player families inquired if they could have their own custom versions of the book made for their own children, and the Stromes obliged to share their book as a template that other players could adapt.

Strome is the owner of Golden Retrievers. An account that the Stromes created dedicated to their family's dogs attracted a substantial following. The account was originally dedicated to the Stromes' first dog, Wrigley (named for Wrigley Field, a professional baseball stadium in Chicago). Wrigley (whom Strome had brought home as a puppy during the 2020 season All-Star Game break) became a celebrity canine among Blackhawks fans. Crediting Wrigley with helping him cope with stresses of his playing career and the COVID-19 pandemic, Strome would often mention him during interviews. The Instagram account dedicated to him had attracted more than 20,000 followers. In April 2022, Wrigley died of sepsis from post-operative complications at the age of 2. Soon afterwards, the Stromes got a new golden retriever puppy from the same breeder, which they named Benny. In 2023, they got an additional puppy from the breeder, which they named Ollie. During the 2023–24 season, Strome debuted a custom suit jacket that he wore while traveling for hockey featuring photos of his dogs on its inner lining.

== Career statistics ==
=== Regular season and playoffs ===
			Regular season					Playoffs
Season	Team	League	GP	G	A	Pts	PIM	GP	G	A	Pts	PIM
2012–13	Toronto Marlboros	GTHL	60	65	78	143	8	—	—	—	—	—
2013–14	Erie Otters	OHL	60	10	29	39	11	14	3	6	9	0
2014–15	Erie Otters	OHL	68	45	84	129	32	20	10	12	22	12
2015–16	Erie Otters	OHL	56	37	74	111	44	13	10	11	21	12
2016–17	Arizona Coyotes	NHL	7	0	1	1	0	—	—	—	—	—
2016–17	Erie Otters	OHL	35	22	53	75	18	22	14	20	34	14
2017–18	Arizona Coyotes	NHL	21	4	5	9	8	—	—	—	—	—
2017–18	Tucson Roadrunners	AHL	50	22	31	53	28	9	3	5	8	2
2018–19	Arizona Coyotes	NHL	20	3	3	6	6	—	—	—	—	—
2018–19	Chicago Blackhawks	NHL	58	17	34	51	14	—	—	—	—	—
2019–20	Chicago Blackhawks	NHL	58	12	26	38	16	9	2	1	3	2
2020–21	Chicago Blackhawks	NHL	40	9	8	17	14	—	—	—	—	—
2021–22	Chicago Blackhawks	NHL	69	22	26	48	28	—	—	—	—	—
2022–23	Washington Capitals	NHL	81	23	42	65	24	—	—	—	—	—
2023–24	Washington Capitals	NHL	82	27	40	67	22	4	1	1	2	0
2024–25	Washington Capitals	NHL	82	29	53	82	34	10	2	9	11	2
2025–26	Washington Capitals	NHL	80	19	39	58	46	—	—	—	—	—
NHL totals			598	165	277	442	212	23	5	11	16	4

=== International ===
Year	Team	Event	Result	GP	G	A	Pts	PIM
2014	Canada Ontario	U17	5th	5	6	5	11	0
2014	Canada	IH18	1st place, gold medalist(s)	5	5	1	6	0
2016	Canada	WJC	6th	5	4	2	6	4
2017	Canada	WJC	2nd place, silver medalist(s)	7	3	7	10	0
2019	Canada	WC	2nd place, silver medalist(s)	10	1	4	5	2
Junior totals				22	18	15	33	4
Senior totals				10	1	4	5	2

== Awards and honours ==
Award	Year	Ref
GTMMHL
Midget Player of the Year	2013	
OHL
Second All-Star Team	2015	
Eddie Powers Memorial Trophy	2015	
William Hanley Trophy	2015	
CHL
CHL Top Scorer Award (tied with Conor Garland)	2015	
AHL
Rookie of the Month November	2017	
All-Star Game	2018	
All-Rookie Team	2018	
International
World U-17 Hockey Challenge All-Star Team	2014	

Awards and achievements
Preceded by Brendan Perlini	Arizona Coyotes first-round draft pick 2015	Succeeded by Clayton Keller
