= Erie Otters =

Ontario Hockey League team in Erie, Pennsylvania

- City: Erie, Pennsylvania
- League: Ontario Hockey League
- Conference: Western
- Division: Midwest
- Founded: 1996–97
- Home arena: Erie Insurance Arena
- Colors: Navy, gold, red, tan, white
- General manager: Dave Brown
- Head coach: Kris Mallette
- Media: FloHockey; Erie Times-News; Jet Radio 1400; Fox Sports 1330 AM; Happi 927; 90.5 WERG; Kinzua Country 104.3; Channel 98.9; Sunny 105.7; WKSN 1340 AM; Rock 103; ESPN 970 WFUN
- Website: ottershockey.com

Franchise history
- 1946–1953: Windsor Spitfires
- 1953–1960: Hamilton Tiger Cubs
- 1960–1974: Hamilton Red Wings
- 1974–1978: Hamilton/St. Catharines Fincups
- 1978–1984: Brantford Alexanders
- 1984–1988: Hamilton Steelhawks
- 1988–1996: Niagara Falls Thunder
- 1996–present: Erie Otters

Current uniform

The Erie Otters are a major junior ice hockey team based in Erie, Pennsylvania. They compete in the Midwest Division of the Ontario Hockey League (OHL) and are one of three American-based teams in the league. The team's name references the North American river otter, a species native to the Lake Erie region. The Otters play their home games at Erie Insurance Arena, located in downtown Erie, adjacent to UPMC Park and the Warner Theatre.

The Otters have won the J. Ross Robertson Cup as OHL champions twice, in the 2001–02 and 2016–17 seasons. They were Western Conference champions and recipients of the Wayne Gretzky Trophy in 2014–15 and 2016–17. The team also earned the Hamilton Spectator Trophy for finishing first overall in the regular-season standings in 2000–01, 2015–16, and 2016–17, and secured six Holody Trophy titles as Midwest Division champions.

== History ==
=== Relocation years (1946–1996) ===
The franchise that would become the Erie Otters originated in 1946 as the Windsor Spitfires. The team remained in Windsor until 1953, when it relocated to Hamilton and was renamed the Hamilton Tiger Cubs. During this period, the team played its home games at the Barton Street Arena. In 1960, following a partial acquisition by the Detroit Red Wings of the National Hockey League (NHL), the franchise was renamed the Hamilton Red Wings, establishing an affiliation with its NHL counterpart.

By the 1972–73 season, under new ownership by Joe Finochio and the Cupido brothers, Ron and Mario, the franchise was rebranded as the Hamilton Fincups. The team remained in Hamilton until 1976, when the closure and condemnation of the Hamilton Forum forced the franchise to relocate. For the 1976–77 season, the Fincups played at the Garden City Arena in St. Catharines. The franchise returned to Hamilton the following season, playing at the Mountain Arena. Ongoing difficulties, including low attendance and the lack of a modern facility, prompted another move. For the 1978–79 season, the team relocated to Brantford and was renamed the Brantford Alexanders.

By the 1984–85 season, the franchise returned to Hamilton as the Hamilton Steelhawks, with plans to play in the newly constructed Copps Coliseum. Despite the new venue, attendance remained low, leading to another relocation before the 1988–89 season. The team moved to Niagara Falls and became the Niagara Falls Thunder. In 1996, the franchise relocated to Pennsylvania and renamed itself the Erie Otters.

=== Early success (1996–2002) ===
After a modest first three seasons in Erie, the Otters improved their league performance at the turn of the millennium, winning the Holody Trophy as Midwest Division champions in 2000, the first of three consecutive division titles. During the 2000–01 season, the Otters advanced to the Western Conference final for the first time, where the Plymouth Whalers defeated them. This period culminated in the team winning the J. Ross Robertson Cup as OHL champions in the 2001–02 season. Head coach Dave MacQueen earned the OHL Coach of the Year award, while general manager Sherwood Bassin earned both the OHL Executive of the Year and CHL Executive of the Year awards for building the championship team.

=== The emergence of Ryan O'Reilly (2006–08) ===
During the 2006–07 and 2007–08 seasons, the Otters finished near the bottom of the Western Conference standings. However, the team saw the emergence of future NHL player Ryan O'Reilly, who was selected first overall in the 2007 OHL Priority Selection, receiving the Jack Ferguson Award. In his rookie season (2007–08), O'Reilly recorded 52 points in 61 games. He was named the Otters' Rookie of the Year and Most Sportsmanlike Player, and was Erie's nominee for the Bobby Smith Trophy, which recognizes combined excellence in academics and athletics.

=== The rise of Connor McDavid (2012–15) ===
Following several years of decline, the Otters entered a rebuilding phase focused on drafting and developing young talent. This strategy led to the selection of Connor McDavid first overall in the 2012 OHL Priority Selection. McDavid quickly distinguished himself as an exceptional player, drawing attention for his skill and on-ice vision. He was granted "exceptional player" status by Hockey Canada, allowing him to join the Otters at age fifteen. Under his leadership, the Otters set a franchise record with 52 wins during the 2013–14 season, the first of a CHL record four consecutive 50-win seasons. The Otters advanced to the J. Ross Robertson Cup finals in 2015, but the Oshawa Generals defeated them.

=== Memorial Cup appearance (2017) ===
On March 18, 2017, the Otters set a Canadian Hockey League (CHL) record by becoming the first team to achieve four consecutive 50-win seasons, spanning from 2013 to 2017. Previously, teams such as the Kelowna Rockets (2012–15), Edmonton Oil Kings (2011–14), Saint John Sea Dogs (2009–12), and Kamloops Blazers (1989–92) had shared the record with three consecutive 50-win seasons.

During the 2017 Memorial Cup on May 22, the Otters set a new record for most goals scored by a single team in one game by defeating the Saint John Sea Dogs 12–5. Their 12 goals broke the previous record of 11 goals, which was held jointly by the Quebec Remparts (1974, 11–3) and the Regina Pats (1980, 11–2). Among the standout individual performances was Dylan Strome, who tallied seven points (four goals, three assists) during the game. Taylor Raddysh tied the previous record with six points (two goals, four assists) in the same match.

== Uniforms and logos ==
The Otters have used a navy blue, gold, red, and white color scheme since 1996. Their original primary logo from 1996 through to 2017, featured a stylized otter holding a hockey stick. Home uniforms were navy blue with red and gold accents, and the away uniforms were white with matching trim. During the 2013–14 season, the Otters introduced a gold alternate jersey with navy blue and white trim, inspired by the city's former professional hockey team, the Erie Blades. This gold sweater was later used in 2016 paired with matching gold helmets. The team adopted the cursive "Otters" wordmark as its primary logo in 2017, and introduced a gold, navy blue, and white color scheme, making the former alternate jersey the primary home uniform. The Otters updated their original logo with a navy, gold, and gray color scheme in 2019, and designed shoulder patch featuring "ERIE" in a Pennsylvania keystone shape. Before their 2026–27 season, the Otters retained the 2019 primary logo but restored red to their color scheme for the first time since 2017. The team also added red to the keystone and introduced a commemorative 30th-anniversary logo.

=== Primary logos ===
1996–2017

2017–2019

2019–2026

2026–present

== Arena ==
The Erie Otters play their home games at Erie Insurance Arena, located in downtown Erie, Pennsylvania. The arena opened in 1983 and has a seating capacity of over 6,700 for ice hockey events. In addition to hosting Otters games, Erie Insurance Arena serves as a multi-purpose venue for concerts, conventions, and other sporting events.

== Championships ==
List of championships:

J. Ross Robertson Cup	Wayne Gretzky Trophy	Hamilton Spectator Trophy	Holody Trophy
OHL Champions	Western Conference Champions	1st Place - Regular Season	Midwest Division Champions
2001–02 2016–17	2001–02 2014–15 2016–17	2000–01 2015–16 2016–17	1999–00 2000–01 2001–02 2014–15 2015–16 2016–17

== Coaches ==
List of coaches:

			Regular season								Playoffs				Memorial Cup
Coach	First season	Last season	GP	W	L	T	OTL	SOL	PTS	PCT%	GP	W	L	PCT%	GP	W	L	PCT%
Chris Johnstone	1996-97	1996-97*	39	11	25	3	0	0	25	.321	-	-	-	-	-	-	-	-
Dale Dunbar	1996-97*	1997-98	93	45	36	9	3	0	102	.548	12	4	8	.333	-	-	-	-
Paul Theriault	1998-99	1998-99	68	31	33	4	0	0	66	.485	5	1	4	.200	-	-	-	-
Dave MacQueen	1999-2000	2005-06	476	229	183	36	25	3	522	.548	64	38	26	.594	4	2	2	.500
Peter Sidorkiewicz	2006-07	2007-08*	84	19	62	0	1	2	41	.244	-	-	-	-	-	-	-	-
Robbie Ftorek	2007-08*	2012-13*	353	139	174	0	16	13	307	.436	16	4	12	.250	-	-	-	-
Kris Knoblauch	2012-13*	2016-17	313	216	83	0	9	5	446	.712	69	46	23	.667	5	3	2	.600
Chris Hartsburg	2017-18	2021-22*	199	75	99	0	14	11	175	.438	-	-	-	-	-	-	-	-
B. J. Adams	2021-22*	2022-23*	90	36	48	0	3	3	78	.400	-	-	-	-	-	-	-	-
Stan Butler	2022-23*	2023-24	95	40	44	0	5	6	18	.421	6	2	4	.333

^{*} indicates replacement mid-season.

=== Award winners ===
List of award winners:

Season	Coach	Award Won	Award For	ref
2000-01	Dave MacQueen	Matt Leyden Trophy	Coach of the Year
2015-16	Kris Knoblauch	Matt Leyden Trophy	Coach of the Year

== General managers ==
List of general managers with multiple seasons in parentheses.

- 1998–2015 – Sherwood Bassin (17)
- 2015–present – Dave Brown (8)

== Players ==
=== Award winners ===
List of award winners:

Season	Player(s)	Award won	Award for
1999-00	Brad Boyes	CHL Scholastic Player of the Year Award
1999-00	Brad Boyes	Bobby Smith Trophy	OHL Scholastic Player of the Year
2000-01	Brad Boyes	Red Tilson Trophy	Most Outstanding Player
2000-01	Brad Boyes	William Hanley Trophy	Most Sportsmanlike Player
2000-01	Joey Sullivan	Dan Snyder Memorial Trophy	Humanitarian of the Year
2001-02	Brad Boyes	CHL Sportsman of the Year Award
2001-02	Brad Boyes	Red Tilson Trophy	Most Outstanding Player
2001-02	Brad Boyes	William Hanley Trophy	Most Sportsmanlike Player
2001-02	Brad Boyes	Wayne Gretzky 99 Award	OHL Playoffs MVP
2001-02	Cory Pecker	Leo Lalonde Memorial Trophy	Overage Player of the Year
2003-04	Chris Campoli	CHL Humanitarian of the Year
2003-04	Chris Campoli	Dan Snyder Memorial Trophy	Humanitarian of the Year
2006-07	Derrick Bagshaw	Roger Neilson Memorial Award	Top Academic University Player
2006-07	Ryan O'Reilly	Jack Ferguson Award	First Overall Draft Pick
2011-12	Connor McDavid	Jack Ferguson Award	First Overall Draft Pick
2011-12	Adam Pelech	Bobby Smith Trophy	Scholastic Player of the Year
2011-12	Adam Pelech	Ivan Tennant Memorial Award	Top Academic High School Player
2012-13	Connor McDavid	Emms Family Award	Top First-Year Player
2013-14	Connor Brown	Eddie Powers Memorial Trophy	OHL Leading Scorer
2013-14	Connor Brown	Jim Mahon Memorial Trophy	Top Scoring Right Winger
2013-14	Connor Brown	Red Tilson Trophy	Most Outstanding Player
2013-14	Connor Brown	CHL Top Scorer Award	Highest Scoring Player in CHL
2013-14	Dane Fox	Leo Lalonde Memorial Trophy	Overage Player of the Year
2013-14	Connor McDavid	William Hanley Trophy	Most Sportsmanlike Player
2013-14	Connor McDavid	Bobby Smith Trophy	Scholastic Player of the Year
2013-14	Oscar Dansk & Devin Williams	Dave Pinkney Trophy	Lowest Team Goals Against
2014-15	Connor McDavid	Red Tilson Trophy	Most Outstanding Player
2014-15	Connor McDavid	Bobby Smith Trophy	Scholastic Player of the Year
2014-15	Connor McDavid	Wayne Gretzky 99 Award	OHL Playoffs MVP
2014-15	Connor McDavid	CHL Player of the Year
2014-15	Connor McDavid	CHL Top Draft Prospect Award	Top Eligible Draft Prospect in CHL
2014-15	Dylan Strome	Eddie Powers Memorial Trophy	OHL Leading Scorer
2014-15	Dylan Strome	William Hanley Trophy	Most Sportsmanlike Player
2014-15	Dylan Strome	CHL Top Scorer Award	Highest Scoring Player in CHL
2014-15	Alex DeBrincat	Emms Family Award	Top First-Year Player
2014-15	Alex DeBrincat	CHL Rookie of the Year
2016-17	Alex DeBrincat	Red Tilson Trophy	Most Outstanding Player
2016-17	Alex DeBrincat	Eddie Powers Memorial Trophy	OHL Leading Scorer
2016-17	Alex DeBrincat	Jim Mahon Memorial Trophy	Top Scoring Right Winger
2016-17	Alex DeBrincat	CHL Player of the Year
2016-17	Darren Raddysh	Leo Lalonde Memorial Trophy	Overage Player of the Year
2016-17	Darren Raddysh	Max Kaminsky Trophy	Defenceman of the Year
2016-17	Warren Foegele	Wayne Gretzky 99 Award	OHL Playoffs MVP
2016-17	Dylan Strome	Stafford Smythe Memorial Trophy	Memorial Cup MVP
2016-17	Dylan Strome & Taylor Raddysh	Ed Chynoweth Trophy	Memorial Cup Leading Scorer(s)
2016-17	Anthony Cirelli	George Parsons Trophy	Memorial Cup Most Sportsmanlike Player

=== NHL alumni ===
List of National Hockey League (NHL) alumni:

- Nikita Alexeev
- Brady Austin
- Nick Baptiste
- Adam Berti
- Michael Blunden
- Brad Boyes
- Chris Breen
- David Broll
- Connor Brown
- Andre Burakovsky
- Chris Campoli
- Erik Cernak
- Anthony Cirelli
- Carlo Colaiacovo
- Tim Connolly
- Oscar Dansk
- Alex DeBrincat
- Travis Dermott
- Jamie Drysdale
- Remi Elie
- Warren Foegele
- Brendan Gaunce
- Luke Gazdic
- Justin Hodgman
- Hayden Hodgson
- Mike Liambas
- Brett MacLean
- Kurtis MacDermid
- Mason Marchment
- Connor McDavid
- Greg McKegg
- Steve Montador
- Adam Munro
- Jordan Nolan
- Ryan O'Marra
- Ryan O'Reilly
- Nick Palmieri
- Jeff Paul
- Adam Pelech
- Anthony Peluso
- Geoff Platt
- Darren Raddysh
- Taylor Raddysh
- Michael Rupp
- Matthew Schaefer
- Dylan Strome
- Stephen Valiquette
- Phil Varone
- Jason Ward
- Jeff Zehr

=== NHL first-round draft picks ===
Connor McDavid became the first player with Erie Otters ties to be selected first overall in a major professional sports league draft when the Edmonton Oilers chose him with the top pick in the 2015 NHL entry draft on June 26, 2015. His selection marked a significant milestone for the Otters organization and underscored the team's success in developing elite hockey talent.

List of first round NHL draft picks:

Year	Player	Team	Round	Pick #
1997	Jason Ward	Montreal Canadiens	1	11
1998	Michael Rupp	New York Islanders	1	9
1999	Tim Connolly	New York Islanders	1	5
2000	Nikita Alexeev	Tampa Bay Lightning	1	8
2000	Brad Boyes	Toronto Maple Leafs	1	24
2001	Carlo Colaiacovo	Toronto Maple Leafs	1	17
2001	Adam Munro	Chicago Blackhawks	1	29
2005	Ryan O'Marra	New York Islanders	1	15
2013	Andre Burakovsky	Washington Capitals	1	23
2015	Connor McDavid	Edmonton Oilers	1	1
2015	Dylan Strome	Arizona Coyotes	1	3
2020	Jamie Drysdale	Anaheim Ducks	1	6
2025	Matthew Schaefer	New York Islanders	1	1

=== Retired numbers ===
- Brad Boyes (#16)
- Vince Scott (#18)
- Connor McDavid (#97)

== Season-by-season results ==
Regular season and playoffs results:

Legend: GP = Games played, W = Wins, L = Losses, T = Ties, OTL = Overtime losses, SL = Shoot-out losses, Pts = Points, GF = Goals for, GA = Goals against

Memorial Cup champions	OHL champions	OHL finalists

Season	Regular season											Playoffs
Season	GP	W	L	T	OTL	SOL	Pts	Pct	GF	GA	Finish	Playoffs
1996–97	66	23	36	7	–	–	53	0.402	240	260	5th Central	Lost conference quarterfinal (Guelph Storm) 4–1
1997–98	66	33	28	5	–	–	71	0.538	261	252	4th West	Lost conference quarterfinal (London Knights) 4–3
1998–99	68	31	33	4	–	–	66	0.485	271	297	3rd Midwest	Lost conference quarterfinal Guelph Storm 4–1
1999–2000	68	33	28	4	3	–	73	0.515	224	229	1st Midwest	Won conference quarterfinal (Brampton Battalion) 4–2; Lost conference semifinal (Sault Ste. Marie Greyhounds) 4–3
2000–01	68	45	11	10	2	–	102	0.735	264	171	1st Midwest	Won conference quarterfinal (London Knights) 4–1; Won conference semifinal (Brampton Battalion) 4–1; Lost conference final (Plymouth Whalers) 4–1
2001–02	68	41	22	4	1	–	87	0.632	246	218	1st Midwest	Won conference quarterfinal (Sarnia Sting) 4–1; Won conference semifinal (London Knights) 4–2; Won conference final (Windsor Spitfires) 4–1; Won OHL championship (Barrie Colts) 4–1; Lost 2002 Memorial Cup semifinal (Victoriaville Tigres) 5–4 (OT)
2002–03	68	24	35	6	3	–	57	0.397	181	248	5th Midwest	Did not qualify
2003–04	68	29	26	6	7	–	71	0.471	221	212	5th Midwest	Won conference quarterfinal (Sarnia Sting) 4–1; Lost conference semifinal (London Knights) 4–0
2004–05	68	31	26	6	5	–	73	0.500	186	207	4th Midwest	Lost conference quarterfinal (Kitchener Rangers) 4–2
2005–06	68	26	35	–	4	3	59	0.434	219	266	5th Midwest	Did not qualify
2006–07	68	15	50	–	1	2	33	0.243	209	378	5th Midwest	Did not qualify
2007–08	68	18	46	–	2	2	40	0.294	206	343	5th Midwest	Did not qualify
2008–09	68	34	29	–	3	2	73	0.537	208	254	3rd Midwest	Lost conference quarterfinal (London Knights) 4–1
2009–10	68	33	28	–	5	2	73	0.537	257	259	4th Midwest	Lost conference quarterfinal (Windsor Spitfires) 4–0
2010–11	68	40	26	–	1	1	82	0.603	281	229	3rd Midwest	Lost conference quarterfinal (Windsor Spitfires) 4–3
2011–12	68	10	52	–	3	3	26	0.191	169	338	5th Midwest	Did not qualify
2012–13	68	19	40	–	4	5	47	0.346	206	312	5th Midwest	Did not qualify
2013–14	68	52	14	–	2	0	106	0.779	312	170	2nd Midwest	Won conference quarterfinal (Saginaw Spirit) 4–1; Won conference semifinal (Sault Ste. Marie Greyhounds) 4–0; Lost conference final (Guelph Storm) 4–1
2014–15	68	50	14	–	2	2	104	0.765	331	212	1st Midwest	Won conference quarterfinal (Sarnia Sting) 4–1; Won conference semifinal (London Knights) 4–0; Won conference final (Sault Ste. Marie Greyhounds) 4–2; Lost OHL championship (Oshawa Generals) 4–1
2015–16	68	52	15	–	1	0	105	0.772	269	183	1st Midwest	Won conference quarterfinal (Saginaw Spirit) 4–0; Won conference semifinal (Sault Ste. Marie Greyhounds) 4–1; Lost conference final (London Knights) 4–0
2016–17	68	50	15	–	2	1	103	0.757	319	182	1st Midwest	Won conference quarterfinal (Sarnia Sting) 4–0; Won conference semifinal (London Knights) 4–3; Won conference final (Owen Sound Attack) 4–2; Won OHL championship (Mississauga Steelheads) 4–1; Lost 2017 Memorial Cup final (Windsor Spitfires) 4–3
2017–18	68	23	35	–	7	3	56	0.412	220	270	5th Midwest	Did not qualify
2018–19	68	26	38	–	3	1	56	0.412	230	300	5th Midwest	Did not qualify
2019–20	63	26	26	–	4	7	63	0.500	229	236	5th Midwest	Playoffs cancelled due to the COVID-19 pandemic
2020–21	Season cancelled due to the COVID-19 pandemic											
2021–22	68	27	37	–	2	2	58	0.426	223	267	5th Midwest	Did not qualify
2022–23	68	21	40	–	2	5	49	0.360	207	287	5th Midwest	Did not qualify
2023–24	68	33	28	–	5	2	73	0.537	254	270	3rd Midwest	Lost conference quarterfinal (Kitchener Rangers) 4–2
2024–25	68	34	28	–	4	2	74	0.544	248	261	3rd Midwest	Won conference quarterfinal (Saginaw Spirit) 4–1; Lost conference semifinal (London Knights) 4–0
2025–26	68	18	41	–	5	4	45	0.331	179	289	5th Midwest	Did not qualify
