= Taylor Raddysh =

Canadian ice hockey player (born 1998)

- Born: February 18, 1998 (age 28) Caledon, Ontario, Canada
- Height: 6 ft 2 in (188 cm)
- Weight: 201 lb (91 kg; 14 st 5 lb)
- Position: Winger
- Shoots: Right
- NHL team Former teams: New York Rangers; Tampa Bay Lightning; Chicago Blackhawks; Washington Capitals
- NHL draft: 58th overall, 2016; Tampa Bay Lightning
- Playing career: 2018–present

Taylor Raddysh (born February 18, 1998) is a Canadian professional ice hockey player who is a winger for the New York Rangers of the National Hockey League (NHL). Raddysh was drafted in the 2016 NHL entry draft in the second round (58th) by the Tampa Bay Lightning.

Internationally, Raddysh has represented Canada at the 2018 World Junior Championships where he won a gold medal.

== Playing career ==
Raddysh was drafted 19th overall by the Erie Otters of the Ontario Hockey League (OHL) in the 2014 OHL draft.

In the 2016–17 season, Raddysh helped the Otters to their second J. Ross Robertson Cup in franchise history, scoring 109 points in just 58 regular season games. Raddysh was named a Third Team All-Star at the conclusion of the season. On May 15, 2017, Raddysh was signed to a three-year, entry-level contract with the Tampa Bay Lightning.

On January 6, 2018, Raddysh along with Detroit Red Wings prospect Jordan Sambrook were traded to the Sault Ste. Marie Greyhounds in exchange for Hayden Fowler and nine draft picks. Following the 2017–18 season, Raddysh participated at the Lightning's 2018–19 training camp. He was reassigned to the Lightning's American Hockey League affiliate, the Syracuse Crunch, on September 23. On December 28, 2018, in a game against the Utica Comets, he recorded 5 assists in a 10–0 Crunch win. His 46 points (18 goals, 28 assists) helped lead the Crunch to a division title.

On June 18, 2018, Raddysh, along with Boris Katchouk, were involved in the Hockey Canada gang sexual assault of the woman known as E.M. in London, Ontario. The pair of them entered Room 209 at the Delta Arms hotel after responding to a text message in the group chat from team mate Michael McLeod for a "3-way, quick" and a "gummer." The two men entered the room with pizza, while the complainant was naked on the bed. Though Raddysh had access to his 2018 police report, he responded to questioning in court to the Crown attorney that "sitting here today, I can’t remember." He was not charged with any wrongdoing.

On April 19, 2021, Raddysh was named the CCM/AHL Player of the Week for the period ending April 18, 2021. He scored three goals and added three assists in three games, including scoring his first career shorthanded goal.

On October 13, 2021, Raddysh made his NHL debut with the Tampa Bay Lightning against the Pittsburgh Penguins at Amalie Arena. On November 1, 2021, Raddysh recorded his first career NHL assist and point. On December 4, 2021, Raddysh recorded his first career NHL goal in a 3-2 Lightning OT win over the Boston Bruins at TD Garden. Raddysh was the 5th player in Lightning history to score a shorthanded goal as their first career goal.

On March 18, 2022, the Lightning, looking to bolster their offense for an upcoming playoff run, traded Raddysh along with teammate Boris Katchouk and two first-round picks in 2023 and 2024 to the Chicago Blackhawks in exchange for forward Brandon Hagel and two fourth-round draft picks. Raddysh appeared in 21 games for Chicago to close out the 2021–22 NHL season, where he accrued 10 points. In his first full season with the Blackhawks, Raddysh tallied 37 points, including a team-high 20 goals during the 2022–23 NHL season. His most productive stint of the season came between March 8 through 14, where he recorded six goals and one assist over four games.

Following a disappointing 2023–24 season in which he managed only five goals and nine assists for 14 points, Raddysh did not receive a qualifying offer from the Blackhawks and became a free agent.

On July 1, 2024, Raddysh signed a one-year, $1 million contract with the Washington Capitals. As a fixture in the lineup amongst the Capitals bottom six forwards, Raddysh registered 7 goals and 27 points through 80 appearances in a successful 2024–25 season with Washington.

At the conclusion of his contract, Raddysh left as a free agent and signed a two-year, $3 million contract with the New York Rangers on July 1, 2025.

After spending the 2025-26 NHL season with the Rangers, he began the 2026-27 season with the Rangers' AHL affiliate Hartford Wolf Pack. He was recalled to the Rangers on 16 October 2026.

== International play ==
Medal record

Men's ice hockey

Representing Canada

World Junior Championships
Silver medal – second place	2017 Canada	
Gold medal – first place	2018 United States	

Internationally, Raddysh represented Canada at the 2017 World Junior Championships, becoming the 4th player in Team Canada history to score 4 goals in a game against Latvia on December 29, 2016. The following year he returned to Team Canada helping them win a gold at the 2018 World Junior Championships in Buffalo, New York.

== Personal life ==
Raddysh was born and raised in Caledon with his brother Darren, who also plays in the NHL. As the two were a few years apart, they played competitive lacrosse on the same teams and golfed together at the Caledon Country Club. Darren is under contract with the Toronto Maple Leafs, and made his NHL debut on Dec 30, 2021. He is Ukrainian-Canadian.

== Career statistics ==
=== Regular season and playoffs ===
			Regular season					Playoffs
Season	Team	League	GP	G	A	Pts	PIM	GP	G	A	Pts	PIM
2013–14	Toronto Marlboros	GTMMHL	31	25	27	52	28	14	3	4	7	10
2014–15	Erie Otters	OHL	58	21	6	27	13	20	3	3	6	8
2015–16	Erie Otters	OHL	67	24	49	73	18	12	4	6	10	2
2016–17	Erie Otters	OHL	58	42	67	109	37	22	12	19	31	18
2017–18	Erie Otters	OHL	30	15	29	44	16	—	—	—	—	—
2017–18	Sault Ste. Marie Greyhounds	OHL	28	18	21	39	14	24	13	21	34	14
2018–19	Syracuse Crunch	AHL	70	18	28	46	34	4	0	0	0	2
2019–20	Syracuse Crunch	AHL	62	19	16	35	20	—	—	—	—	—
2020–21	Syracuse Crunch	AHL	27	12	17	29	10	—	—	—	—	—
2021–22	Tampa Bay Lightning	NHL	53	5	7	12	8	—	—	—	—	—
2021–22	Chicago Blackhawks	NHL	21	6	4	10	2	—	—	—	—	—
2022–23	Chicago Blackhawks	NHL	78	20	17	37	16	—	—	—	—	—
2023–24	Chicago Blackhawks	NHL	73	5	9	14	22	—	—	—	—	—
2024–25	Washington Capitals	NHL	80	7	20	27	18	7	0	1	1	4
2025–26	New York Rangers	NHL	68	9	10	19	12	—	—	—	—	—
NHL totals			373	52	67	119	78	7	0	1	1	4

=== International ===
Year	Team	Event	Result	GP	G	A	Pts	PIM
2014	Canada White	U17	5th	5	0	1	1	0
2017	Canada	WJC	2nd place, silver medalist(s)	7	5	1	6	4
2018	Canada	WJC	1st place, gold medalist(s)	7	2	3	5	4
Junior totals				19	7	5	12	8

== Awards & honours ==
Award	Year	Ref
AHL
CCM/AHL Player of the Week	2021	
North Division All-Star Team	2021	
