= CHL Rookie of the Year =

Annual award to a Canadian Hockey League player

CHL Rookie of the Year Award
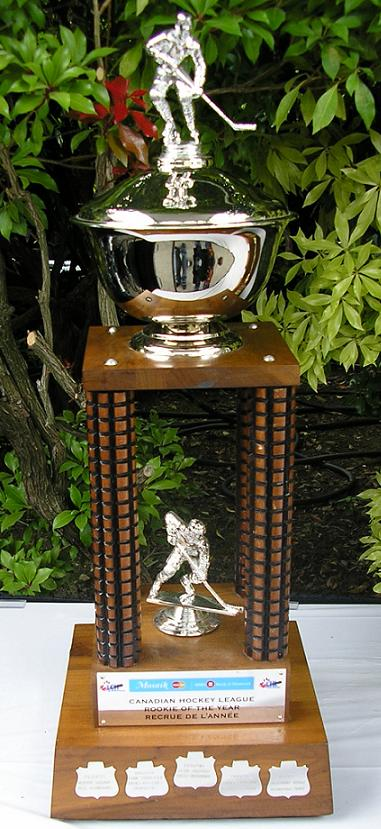
- Sport: Ice hockey
- Awarded for: Annually to the top rookie in the Canadian Hockey League

History
- First award: 1988
- First winner: Martin Gélinas
- Most recent: Tommy Bleyl

The CHL Rookie of the Year Award is given out annually to the top rookie in the Canadian Hockey League. It is chosen from the winners of; the Emms Family Award (OHL Rookie of the Year), the Jim Piggott Memorial Trophy (WHL Rookie of the Year), and the Sidney Crosby Trophy (QMJHL Rookie of the Year).

== Winners ==
List of winners of the CHL Rookie of the Year Award.

| Season | Winner | Team | League |
|---|---|---|---|
| 1987–88 | Martin Gélinas | Hull Olympiques | QMJHL |
| 1988–89 | Yanic Perreault | Trois-Rivières Draveurs | QMJHL |
| 1989–90 | Petr Nedved | Seattle Thunderbirds | WHL |
| 1990–91 | Philippe Boucher | Granby Bisons | QMJHL |
| 1991–92 | Alexandre Daigle | Victoriaville Tigres | QMJHL |
| 1992–93 | Jeff Friesen | Regina Pats | WHL |
| 1993–94 | Vitali Yachmenev | North Bay Centennials | OHL |
| 1994–95 | Bryan Berard | Detroit Junior Red Wings | OHL |
| 1995–96 | Joe Thornton | Sault Ste. Marie Greyhounds | OHL |
| 1996–97 | Vincent Lecavalier | Rimouski Océanic | QMJHL |
| 1997–98 | David Legwand | Plymouth Whalers | OHL |
| 1998–99 | Pavel Brendl | Calgary Hitmen | WHL |
| 1999–2000 | Dan Blackburn | Kootenay Ice | WHL |
| 2000–01 | Scottie Upshall | Kamloops Blazers | WHL |
| 2001–02 | Patrick O'Sullivan | Mississauga IceDogs | OHL |
| 2002–03 | Matt Ellison | Red Deer Rebels | WHL |
| 2003–04 | Sidney Crosby | Rimouski Océanic | QMJHL |
| 2004–05 | Benoît Pouliot | Sudbury Wolves | OHL |
| 2005–06 | John Tavares | Oshawa Generals | OHL |
| 2006–07 | Patrick Kane | London Knights | OHL |
| 2007–08 | Taylor Hall | Windsor Spitfires | OHL |
| 2008–09 | Brett Connolly | Prince George Cougars | WHL |
| 2009–10 | Matt Puempel | Peterborough Petes | OHL |
| 2010–11 | Nail Yakupov | Sarnia Sting | OHL |
| 2011–12 | Mikhail Grigorenko | Quebec Remparts | QMJHL |
| 2012–13 | Valentin Zykov | Baie-Comeau Drakkar | QMJHL |
| 2013–14 | Nikolaj Ehlers | Halifax Mooseheads | QMJHL |
| 2014–15 | Alex DeBrincat | Erie Otters | OHL |
| 2015–16 | Alexander Nylander | Mississauga Steelheads | OHL |
| 2016–17 | Nico Hischier | Halifax Mooseheads | QMJHL |
| 2017–18 | Alexis Lafrenière | Rimouski Océanic | QMJHL |
| 2018–19 | Quinton Byfield | Sudbury Wolves | OHL |
| 2019–20 | Shane Wright | Kingston Frontenacs | OHL |
| 2020–21 | Not awarded due to COVID-19 pandemic | | |
| 2021–22 | Brayden Yager | Moose Jaw Warriors | WHL |
| 2022–23 | Maxim Massé | Chicoutimi Saguenéens | QMJHL |
| 2023–24 | Gavin McKenna | Medicine Hat Tigers | WHL |
| 2024–25 | Landon DuPont | Everett Silvertips | WHL |
| 2025–26 | Tommy Bleyl | Moncton Wildcats | QMJHL |

== See also ==
- List of Canadian Hockey League awards
