= Gordie Dwyer =

Canadian ice hockey player

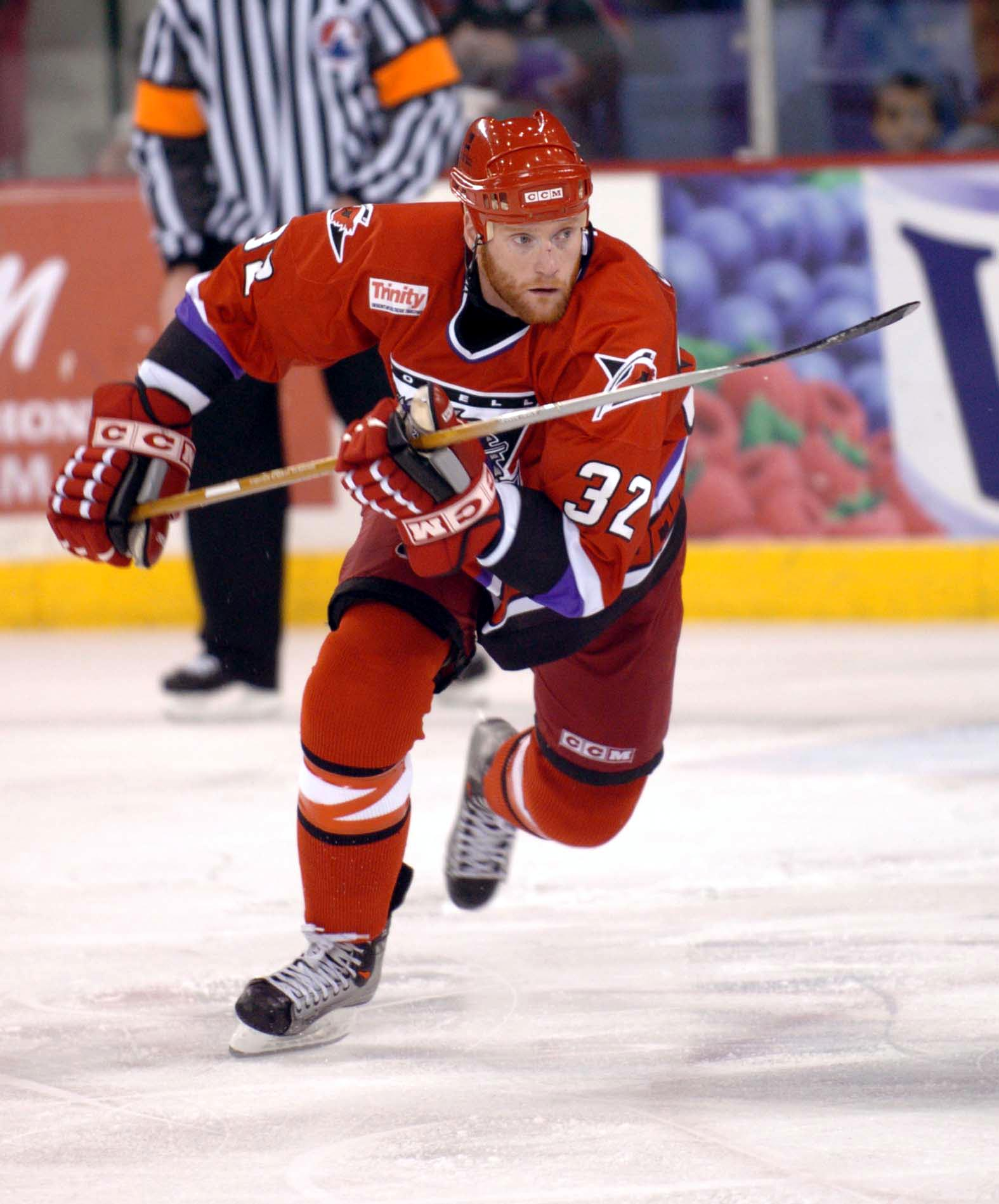
- Dwyer with the Lowell Lock Monsters in 2004
- Born: January 25, 1978 (age 48) Dalhousie, New Brunswick, Canada
- Height: 6 ft 2 in (188 cm)
- Weight: 206 lb (93 kg; 14 st 10 lb)
- Position: Left wing
- Shot: Left
- Played for: Tampa Bay Lightning; New York Rangers; Montreal Canadiens
- NHL draft: 67th overall, 1996; St. Louis Blues; 152nd overall, 1998; Montreal Canadiens
- Playing career: 1998–2009

Gordon Rick Dwyer (born January 25, 1978) is a Canadian former professional ice hockey left winger who played five seasons in the National Hockey League (NHL) for the Tampa Bay Lightning, New York Rangers and Montreal Canadiens. He currently serves as the head coach and general manager of the Newfoundland Regiment of the Quebec Maritimes Junior Hockey League (QMJHL).

== Playing career ==
As a youth, Dwyer played in the 1992 Quebec International Pee-Wee Hockey Tournament with a minor ice hockey team from Drummondville. He attended Philemon Wright High School in Hull, Quebec, while playing for the Hull Olympiques of the Quebec Major Junior Hockey League (QMJHL). He has also played for the Laval Titan, Beauport Harfangs, Drummondville Voltigeurs, and the Quebec Remparts in the QMJHL.

Dwyer was drafted by the St. Louis Blues in the 3rd round, 67th overall, of the 1996 NHL entry draft. Unable to reach a contract agreement with St. Louis, Dwyer re-entered the draft in 1998 and was selected by the Montreal Canadiens in the 6th round, 152nd overall.

While a member of the Tampa Bay Lightning, Dwyer achieved notoriety by receiving a 23-game suspension for leaving the penalty box to engage in a brawl, during which he verbally and physically abused officials, in a pre-season game against the Washington Capitals on September 19, 2000. The suspension stands as one of the longest in NHL history.

In 2004, he signed as a free agent by the Carolina Hurricanes but never played for them. He played for the Lowell Lock Monsters of the American Hockey League (AHL), where he had 9 points and 183 penalty minutes in 56 games. He remained with Lowell for the 2005–06 season, but due to a shoulder injury he played only 17 games with 4 points and 37 penalty minutes. Dwyer attended the Vancouver Canucks training camp in 2006 hoping to earn a roster space. He also attended the New York Islanders 2007 training camp where he was a late cut. Through 108 NHL contests he never scored a goal, though he obtained 5 assists and 394 penalty minutes.

Dwyer spent the latter half of the 2006–07 season with the Örebro Vipers of Swedish Division 1. In his first game for Örebro, he notched two assists, where he had 15 points and 16 penalty minutes in 11 games. In the 2007–08 season, he played for the Portland Pirates of the AHL, where he had 3 points and 27 penalty minutes in 13 games, and in Villingen-Schwenningen for the SERC Wild Wings in the German Bundesliga, where he had 7 points and 34 penalty minutes in 14 games. He returned to the Örebro Vipers for the 2008–09 season, where he had 7 points and 79 penalty minutes in 13 games.

== Coaching career ==
Dwyer was named head coach and associate general manager of the Summerside Western Capitals of the Maritime Junior A Hockey League for the 2009–10 season. Dwyer led a rebuilding team to a regular-season record of 27–20–1–2. The Capitals finished third in the Roger Meek Division and won a seven-game division semifinal series against second-place Miramichi. The Capitals were then eliminated by eventual league champion Woodstock in a five-game division final. In 2010–11, Dwyer returned as the team's head coach and associate director of hockey operations leading Summerside to a second-place finish with a 36–12–1–3 record. Under Dwyer's guidance, the team went on to capture the Kent Cup as league champions with a 12–3 playoff record. Following the season, Dwyer was named the league's coach of the year.

On May 17, 2011, Dwyer was named the head coach of the P.E.I. Rocket of the Quebec Major Junior Hockey League (QMJHL). In The Hockey News 2011 edition of the 100 Most Powerful people in ice hockey, Dwyer was considered one of the top 40 under the age of 40. This recognition was attributed to his assistance in the development of Tuff 'n Lite, a unisex cut resistant protective sport sock. The Rocket rebranded as the Charlottetown Islanders in 2013. On April 28, 2015, Dwyer was released after four years as head coach of the Rocket/Islanders earning a 116–133–9–14 overall record with the franchise, including a 35–28–1–4 his final post season when the Islanders defeated the Sherbrooke Phoenix to advance to the second round for the first time since 2004. At the time, he had been the longest-serving head coach in franchise history.

On June 15, 2015, Dwyer was named the head coach of the KHL Medveščak Zagreb of the Kontinental Hockey League (KHL). On January 31, 2017, Dwyer parted ways with Zagreb to take over the head coaching position at HC Ambrì-Piotta of the Swiss top-flight National League A. His Ambrì-Piotta stint ended at the close of the 2016–17 season.

In July 2017, Dwyer returned to the KHL as head coach of the Belarusian-based HC Dinamo Minsk. He was relieved of his duties on November 9, 2018.

He then returned to the QMJHL for the 2019–20 season as head coach of the Shawinigan Cataractes, but left after one season. In 2021, he became head coach of the QMJHL's Saint John Sea Dogs.

Dwyer has also served as an assistant coach with Team Canada, start from when they won a bronze medal at the 2012 IIHF World U18 Championship in the Czech Republic. In December 2016, he served as assistant coach of Team Canada at the prestigious Spengler Cup, helping guide Canada to their 14th title that year. In 2020–21, he was again an assistant coach at the 2021 IIHF World U18 Championships.

== Career statistics ==
=== Regular season and playoffs ===
			Regular season					Playoffs
Season	Team	League	GP	G	A	Pts	PIM	GP	G	A	Pts	PIM
1994–95	Hull Olympiques	QMJHL	57	3	7	10	204	17	1	3	4	54
1995–96	Hull Olympiques	QMJHL	25	5	9	14	199	—	—	—	—	—
1995–96	Laval Titan College Francais	QMJHL	22	5	17	22	72	—	—	—	—	—
1995–96	Beauport Harfangs	QMJHL	22	4	9	13	87	20	3	5	8	104
1996–97	Drummondville Voltigeurs	QMJHL	66	21	48	69	391	8	6	1	7	39
1997–98	Quebec Remparts	QMJHL	59	18	27	45	365	14	4	9	13	67
1998–99	New Orleans Brass	ECHL	36	1	3	4	163	11	0	0	0	27
1998–99	Fredericton Canadiens	AHL	14	0	0	0	46	—	—	—	—	—
1999–00	Quebec Citadelles	AHL	7	0	0	0	37	—	—	—	—	—
1999–00	Detroit Vipers	IHL	27	0	2	2	147	—	—	—	—	—
1999–00	Tampa Bay Lightning	NHL	24	0	1	1	135	—	—	—	—	—
2000–01	Detroit Vipers	IHL	24	2	3	5	169	—	—	—	—	—
2000–01	Tampa Bay Lightning	NHL	28	0	1	1	96	—	—	—	—	—
2001–02	Springfield Falcons	AHL	17	1	3	4	80	—	—	—	—	—
2001–02	Tampa Bay Lightning	NHL	26	0	2	2	60	—	—	—	—	—
2002–03	Hartford Wolf Pack	AHL	15	3	2	5	117	—	—	—	—	—
2002–03	New York Rangers	NHL	17	0	1	1	50	—	—	—	—	—
2002–03	Montreal Canadiens	NHL	11	0	0	0	46	—	—	—	—	—
2003–04	Hamilton Bulldogs	AHL	55	6	6	12	110	6	0	0	0	15
2003–04	Montreal Canadiens	NHL	2	0	0	0	7	—	—	—	—	—
2004–05	Lowell Lock Monsters	AHL	56	2	7	9	183	11	1	0	1	54
2005–06	Lowell Lock Monsters	AHL	17	0	4	4	37	—	—	—	—	—
2006–07	Örebro HK	SWE-3	11	8	7	15	16	2	0	0	0	28
2007–08	Portland Pirates	AHL	13	1	2	3	27	—	—	—	—	—
2007–08	Schwenningen ERC	DEL	14	2	5	7	34	7	0	1	1	37
2008–09	Örebro HK	SWE-3	27	4	8	12	99	10	3	2	5	4
AHL totals			194	13	24	37	637	17	1	0	1	69
NHL totals			108	0	5	5	394	—	—	—	—	—

== Coaching record ==
Team	Year	League	Regular Season							Post Season
Team	Year	League	G	W	L	T	OTL	Pts	Finish	Result
PEI	2011–12	QMJHL	68	19	43	2	4	44	6th in Maritimes	Missed playoffs
PEI	2012–13	QMJHL	68	41	23	3	1	86	3rd in Maritimes	Lost in First round (VAL)
CHA	2013–14	QMJHL	68	21	39	3	5	50	5th in Maritimes	Lost in First round (HAL)
CHA	2014–15	QMJHL	68	35	28	1	4	75	2nd in Maritimes	Lost in Second round (QUE)
PEI/CHA Totals			272	116	133	9	14	255		
SHA	2019–20	QMJHL	63	29	32	2	0	60	4th in Central	Season cancelled due to COVID-19 pandemic
SHA Totals			63	29	32	2	0	60		
SNB	2021–22	QMJHL	67	46	17	1	3	96	2nd in Maritimes	Lost in First round (RIM)
SNB Totals			67	46	17	1	3	96		
BAT	2022–23	QMJHL	68	20	40	5	3	48	6th in Maritimes	Out of playoffs
BAT	2023–24	QMJHL	68	30	31	3	4	67	4th in Maritimes	Lost in Second round (BAI)
BAT	2024–25	QMJHL	64	33	28	2	1	69	3rd in Maritimes	Lost in First round (CHI)
NFLD	2025–26	QMJHL	0	0	0	0	0	0	Season in progress	TBD
BAT/NFLD Totals			200	83	99	10	8	184		
QMJHL Totals			602	347	281	22	25	595		

== Transactions ==
- Traded to Tampa Bay by Montreal for Mike McBain, November 26, 1999.
- Traded to NY Rangers by Tampa Bay for Boyd Kane, October 10, 2002.
- Claimed on waivers by Montreal from NY Rangers, February 21, 2003.
- Signed as a free agent by Carolina, August 11, 2004.
- Missed majority of 2005–06 season recovering from a shoulder injury.
