= 2025–26 QMJHL season =

57th season of the QMJHL

- League: Quebec Maritimes Junior Hockey League
- Sport: Hockey
- Duration: Regular season September 18, 2025 – March 21, 2026; Playoffs; March 25, 2026 – May 17, 2026
- Teams: 18
- TV partner(s): Eastlink TV; TVA Sports; MATV; FloHockey

Draft
- Top draft pick: Thomas Boisvert
- Picked by: Rouyn-Noranda Huskies

Regular season
- Jean Rougeau Trophy: Moncton Wildcats (3)
- Season MVP: Maxim Massé (Chicoutimi Saguenéens)
- Top scorer: Maxim Massé (Chicoutimi Saguenéens)

Playoffs
- Playoffs MVP: Gabe Smith (Wildcats)
- Finals champions: Chicoutimi Saguenéens
- Runners-up: Moncton Wildcats

QMJHL seasons
- 2024–25 2026–27

2025–26 CHL season
- League: Canadian Hockey League
- Sport: Hockey
- Duration: OHL; September 2025 – May 2026; QMJHL; September 2025 – May 2026; WHL; September 2025 – May 2026
- Teams: 61
- TV partner(s): RDS; TSN; Rogers TV
- Season MVP: Maxim Massé (Chicoutimi Saguenéens)
- Top scorer: Markus Ruck (Medicine Hat Tigers) (WHL)

Memorial Cup
- Finals champions: Kitchener Rangers (3rd title)
- Runners-up: Everett Silvertips

The 2025–26 QMJHL season was the 57th season of the Quebec Maritimes Junior Hockey League. The league played a 64-game regular season beginning on September 18, 2025, and ending on March 21, 2026. It was the first season of play for the Newfoundland Regiment.

Starting this season, all divisions were abolished.

== Regular season standings ==
Standings as of games through March 21, 2026.

Note: GP = Games played; W = Wins; L = Losses; OTL = Overtime losses; SL = Shootout losses; GF = Goals for; GA = Goals against; PTS = Points; x = clinched playoff berth; y = clinched conference title; z = clinched Jean Rougeau Trophy

=== Eastern Conference ===
Eastern Conference	GP	W	L	OTL	SL	PTS	GF	GA	Rank
xyz-Moncton Wildcats	64	50	10	2	2	104	302	164	1
x-Chicoutimi Saguenéens	64	49	10	3	2	103	321	150	2
x-Newfoundland Regiment	64	38	22	3	1	80	245	210	3
x-Charlottetown Islanders	64	33	23	2	6	74	217	240	4
x-Quebec Remparts	64	32	25	6	1	71	209	191	5
x-Cape Breton Eagles	64	28	23	4	9	69	171	198	6
x-Halifax Mooseheads	64	29	29	3	3	64	214	258	7
x-Saint John Sea Dogs	64	23	36	5	0	51	216	265	8
Rimouski Océanic	64	19	44	0	1	39	154	298	9
Baie-Comeau Drakkar	64	15	42	5	2	37	141	265	10

=== Western Conference ===
Western Conference	GP	W	L	OTL	SL	PTS	GF	GA	Rank
xy-Rouyn-Noranda Huskies	64	40	17	5	2	87	221	178	1
x-Blainville-Boisbriand Armada	64	40	18	5	1	86	270	176	2
x-Drummondville Voltigeurs	64	40	18	3	3	86	240	195	3
x-Shawinigan Cataractes	64	35	23	2	4	76	253	214	4
x-Sherbrooke Phoenix	64	33	26	5	0	71	210	214	5
x-Val-d'Or Foreurs	64	26	31	4	3	59	215	250	6
x-Victoriaville Tigres	64	23	36	5	0	51	200	269	7
x-Gatineau Olympiques	64	21	38	4	1	47	143	213	8

== Scoring leaders ==
These are the top ten skaters based on points. If there is a tie in points, goals take precedence over assists; if there is a tie in goals, players with fewer games played take precedence over those with more. Updated following games played on March 21, 2026.

Note: GP = Games played; G = Goals; A = Assists; Pts = Points; PIM = Penalty minutes

Player	Team	GP	G	A	Pts	PIM
Maxim Massé	Chicoutimi Saguenéens	63	51	51	102	40
Philippe Veilleux	Val-d'Or Foreurs	64	43	53	96	10
Thomas Verdon	Rouyn-Noranda Huskies	64	36	59	95	54
Justin Larose	Newfoundland Regiment	64	32	56	88	46
Félix Lacerte	Shawinigan Cataractes	62	38	48	86	55
Nathan Leek	Charlottetown Islanders	63	47	37	84	84
Egor Shilov	Victoriaville Tigres	63	32	50	82	29
Tommy Bleyl	Moncton Wildcats	63	13	68	81	33
Justin Carbonneau	Blainville-Boisbriand Armada	60	51	29	80	64
Alexey Vlasov	Victoriaville Tigres	64	44	36	80	40

== Leading goaltenders ==
These are the top five goaltenders based on goals against average who have played more than 40% of their team's total minutes. Updated following games played on March 21, 2026.

Note: GP = Games played; Mins = Minutes played; W = Wins; L = Losses: OTL = Overtime losses; SL = Shootout losses; GA = Goals Allowed; SO = Shutouts; GAA = Goals against average

Player	Team	GP	Mins	W	L	OTL	SOL	GA	SO	Sv%	GAA
Rudy Guimond	Moncton Wildcats	50	2,995:41	40	7	1	2	113	3	.922	2.27
Patrick Déniger	Quebec Remparts	30	1,751:28	18	9	3	0	68	5	.910	2.33
Raphaël Précourt	Chicoutimi Saguenéens	40	2,319:11	29	7	2	0	94	6	.901	2.43
William Lacelle	Rimouski/Blainville-Boisbriand	45	2,629:22	27	15	1	1	109	7	.917	2.49
Lucas Beckman	Baie-Comeau/Chicoutimi	38	2,122:46	17	15	1	2	92	6	.917	2.60

== 2026 Gilles-Courteau Trophy playoffs ==
In the first round seeding is determined by conference standings, and in the final three rounds, seeding is determined by overall standings.

Conference quarterfinals
W1	Rouyn-Noranda	4
W8	Gatineau	3
W2	Blainville-Boisbriand	4
W7	Victoriaville	0
W3	Drummondville	1
W6	Val-d'Or	4
W4	Shawinigan	4
W5	Sherbrooke	3
E1	Moncton	4
E8	Saint John	0
E2	Chicoutimi	4
E7	Halifax	0
E3	Newfoundland	4
E6	Cape Breton	2
E4	Charlottetown	3
E5	Quebec	4

Quarterfinals
1	Moncton	4
13	Val-d'Or	0
2	Chicoutimi	4
9	Quebec	0
3	Rouyn-Noranda	4
7	Shawinigan	0
4	Blainville-Boisbriand	4
6	Newfoundland	2

Semifinals
1	Moncton	4
4	Blainville-Boisbriand	3
2	Chicoutimi	4
3	Rouyn-Noranda	2

Gilles-Courteau Trophy Championship
1	Moncton	2
2	Chicoutimi	4

== Conference quarterfinals ==
=== Western Conference quarterfinals ===
==== (1) Rouyn-Noranda Huskies vs. (8) Gatineau Olympiques ====
March 27	Gatineau Olympiques	0–8	Rouyn-Noranda Huskies	Aréna Glencore	Recap

March 28	Gatineau Olympiques	0–2	Rouyn-Noranda Huskies	Aréna Glencore	Recap

March 31	Rouyn-Noranda Huskies	6–5	OT	Gatineau Olympiques	Centre Slush Puppie	Recap

April 1	Rouyn-Noranda Huskies	2–3	Gatineau Olympiques	Centre Slush Puppie	Recap

April 3	Gatineau Olympiques	4–1	Rouyn-Noranda Huskies	Aréna Glencore	Recap

April 5	Rouyn-Noranda Huskies	0–2	Gatineau Olympiques	Centre Slush Puppie	Recap

April 7	Gatineau Olympiques	0–5	Rouyn-Noranda Huskies	Aréna Glencore	Recap

Rouyn-Noranda wins series 4 – 3

==== (2) Blainville-Boisbriand Armada vs. (7) Victoriaville Tigres ====
March 27	Victoriaville Tigres	3–5	Blainville-Boisbriand Armada	Centre d'Excellence Sports Rousseau	Recap

March 28	Victoriaville Tigres	3–6	Blainville-Boisbriand Armada	Centre d'Excellence Sports Rousseau	Recap

March 31	Blainville-Boisbriand Armada	4–3	OT	Victoriaville Tigres	Colisée Desjardins	Recap

April 1	Blainville-Boisbriand Armada	4–1	Victoriaville Tigres	Colisée Desjardins	Recap

Blainville-Boisbriand wins series 4 – 0

==== (3) Drummondville Voltigeurs vs. (6) Val-d'Or Foreurs ====
March 27	Val-d'Or Foreurs	6–3	Drummondville Voltigeurs	Centre Marcel-Dionne	Recap

March 28	Val-d'Or Foreurs	4–2	Drummondville Voltigeurs	Centre Marcel-Dionne	Recap

March 31	Drummondville Voltigeurs	4–3	OT	Val-d'Or Foreurs	Centre Agnico Eagle	Recap

April 1	Drummondville Voltigeurs	0–3	Val-d'Or Foreurs	Centre Agnico Eagle	Recap

April 3	Drummondville Voltigeurs	3–5	Val-d'Or Foreurs	Centre Agnico Eagle	Recap

Val-d'Or wins series 4 – 1

==== (4) Shawinigan Cataractes vs. (5) Sherbrooke Phoenix ====
March 27	Sherbrooke Phoenix	4–1	Shawinigan Cataractes	Centre Gervais Auto	Recap

March 28	Sherbrooke Phoenix	4–1	Shawinigan Cataractes	Centre Gervais Auto	Recap

March 31	Shawinigan Cataractes	2–1	Sherbrooke Phoenix	Palais des Sports Léopold-Drolet	Recap

April 1	Shawinigan Cataractes	5–4	2OT	Sherbrooke Phoenix	Palais des Sports Léopold-Drolet	Recap

April 3	Sherbrooke Phoenix	6–1	Shawinigan Cataractes	Centre Gervais Auto	Recap

April 5	Shawinigan Cataractes	4–3	Sherbrooke Phoenix	Palais des Sports Léopold-Drolet	Recap

April 7	Sherbrooke Phoenix	1–6	Shawinigan Cataractes	Centre Gervais Auto	Recap

Shawinigan wins series 4 – 3

=== Eastern Conference quarterfinals ===
==== (1) Moncton Wildcats vs. (8) Saint John Sea Dogs ====
March 27	Saint John Sea Dogs	1–5	Moncton Wildcats	Avenir Centre	Recap
Alexander Donovan (1) - 16:44		First period	No scoring
No scoring		Second period	5:18 - Gavin Cornforth (1); 6:45 - Gavin Cornforth (2); 10:50 - pp - Teddy Mutryn (1)
No scoring		Third period	9:42 - Gabe Smith (1); 10:49 - Gavin Cornforth (3)
Rafaël Courchesne (45 saves / 50 shots)		Goalie stats	Rudy Guimond (16 saves / 17 shots)

March 28	Saint John Sea Dogs	2–3	OT	Moncton Wildcats	Avenir Centre	Recap
No scoring		First period		No scoring
No scoring		Second period		No scoring
Angelo Fullerton (1) - 4:52; Zachary Morin (1) - 9:46		Third period		19:08 - Niko Tournas (1); 19:55 - Gabe Smith (2)
No scoring		First overtime period		9:00 - Gavin Cornforth (4)
Arseni Radkov (47 saves / 50 shots)		Goalie stats		Rudy Guimond (22 saves / 24 shots)

March 31	Moncton Wildcats	6–0	Saint John Sea Dogs	TD Station	Recap
Kuzma Voronin (1) - 0:09; Alex Mercier (1) - 9:56; Gavin Cornforth (5) - 10:34		First period	No scoring
Simon Binkley (1) - 2:23		Second period	No scoring
Preston Lounsbury (1) - 12:36		Third period	No scoring
Rudy Guimond (22 saves / 22 shots)		Goalie stats	Arseni Radkov (10 saves / 15 shots); Rafaël Courchesne (24 saves / 25 shots)

April 1	Moncton Wildcats	7–3	Saint John Sea Dogs	TD Station	Recap
Alex Mercier (2) - 2:03; Gavin Cornforth (6) - 15:42		First period	No scoring
Preston Lounsbury (2) - 2:37; Teddy Mutryn (2) - sh - 15:53; Gabe Smith (3) - pp - 19:37		Second period	No scoring
Preston Lounsbury (3) - 2:52; Kuzma Voronin (3) - 7:50		Third period	9:51 - pp - Angelo Fullerton (2); 11:01 - Zachary Morin (2); 18:46 - Olivier Groulx (1)
Rudy Guimond (19 saves / 21 shots); Jacoby Weiner (0 saves / 1 shot)		Goalie stats	Arseni Radkov (32 saves / 39 shots)

Moncton wins series 4 – 0

==== (2) Chicoutimi Saguenéens vs. (7) Halifax Mooseheads ====
March 27	Halifax Mooseheads	1–8	Chicoutimi Saguenéens	Centre Georges-Vézina	Recap
No scoring		First period	No scoring
Daniel Walters (1) - pp - 16:06		Second period	1:24 - Jordan Tourigny (1); 13:48 - Mavrick Lachance (1); 15:21 - sh - Pēteris Bulāns (1)
No scoring		Third period	1:29 - pp - Émile Guité (1); 5:21 - pp - Nathan Lecompte (1); 5:40 - Pēteris Bulāns (2); 12:00 - sh - Mavrick Lachance (2); 12:49 - Alonso Gosselin (1)
Nicolas Cirka (25 saves / 33 shots); Sam Madgett (2 saves / 2 shots)		Goalie stats	Lucas Beckman (21 saves / 22 shots)

March 28	Halifax Mooseheads	1–2	Chicoutimi Saguenéens	Centre Georges-Vézina	Recap
Quinn Kennedy (1) - pp - 19:51		First period	No scoring
No scoring		Second period	No scoring
No scoring		Third period	12:01 - Jordan Tourigny (2); 14:03 - pp - Maxim Massé (1)
Nicolas Cirka (30 saves / 32 shots)		Goalie stats	Lucas Beckman (18 saves / 19 shots)

March 31	Chicoutimi Saguenéens	6–1	Halifax Mooseheads	Scotiabank Centre	Recap
Anton Linde (1) - 1:04; Jordan Tourigny (3) - 3:39; Émile Guité (2) - pp - 7:29		First period	No scoring
Emmanuel Vermette (1) - pp - 1:27; Emmanuel Vermette (2) - pp - 19:08		Second period	No scoring
Emmanuel Vermette (3) - 1:53		Third period	13:33 - pp - Quinn Kennedy (2)
Lucas Beckman (16 saves / 17 shots)		Goalie stats	Owen Bresson (30 saves / 36 shots)

April 1	Chicoutimi Saguenéens	8–1	Halifax Mooseheads	Scotiabank Centre	Recap
Émile Ricard (1) - 5:36; Tomas Lavoie (1) - pp - 16:36		First period	No scoring
Emmanuel Vermette (4) - 1:58; Liam Lefebvre (1) - 4:31; Nathan Lecompte (2) - pp - 12:58; Maxim Massé (2) - 14:18		Second period	No scoring
Émile Guité (3) - pp - 4:44; Gryphon Watson-Bucci (1) - pp - 12:45		Third period	14:02 - Quinn Kennedy (3)
Lucas Beckman (24 saves / 25 shots)		Goalie stats	Owen Bresson (43 saves / 51 shots)

Chicoutimi wins series 4 – 0

==== (3) Newfoundland Regiment vs. (6) Cape Breton Eagles ====
March 26	Cape Breton Eagles	3–2	Newfoundland Regiment	Mary Brown's Centre	Recap

March 27	Cape Breton Eagles	2–6	Newfoundland Regiment	Mary Brown's Centre	Recap

March 31	Newfoundland Regiment	4–2	Cape Breton Eagles	Centre 200	Recap

April 1	Newfoundland Regiment	5–1	Cape Breton Eagles	Centre 200	Recap

April 3	Newfoundland Regiment	4–5	OT	Cape Breton Eagles	Centre 200	Recap

April 5	Cape Breton Eagles	3–7	Newfoundland Regiment	Mary Brown's Centre	Recap

Newfoundland wins series 4 – 2

==== (4) Charlottetown Islanders vs. (5) Quebec Remparts ====
March 27	Quebec Remparts	3–5	Charlottetown Islanders	Eastlink Centre	Recap

March 28	Quebec Remparts	5–2	Charlottetown Islanders	Eastlink Centre	Recap

March 31	Charlottetown Islanders	3–4	Quebec Remparts	Centre Vidéotron	Recap

April 1	Charlottetown Islanders	3–2	Quebec Remparts	Centre Vidéotron	Recap

April 3	Charlottetown Islanders	3–2	Quebec Remparts	Centre Vidéotron	Recap

April 6	Quebec Remparts	4–2	Charlottetown Islanders	Eastlink Centre	Recap

April 7	Quebec Remparts	1–0	Charlottetown Islanders	Eastlink Centre	Recap

Quebec wins series 4 – 3

== Quarterfinals ==
=== (1) Moncton Wildcats vs. (13) Val-d'Or Foreurs ===
April 10	Val-d'Or Foreurs	1–8	Moncton Wildcats	Avenir Centre	Recap

April 11	Val-d'Or Foreurs	2–3	Moncton Wildcats	Avenir Centre	Recap

April 14	Moncton Wildcats	7–4	Val-d'Or Foreurs	Centre Agnico Eagle	Recap

April 15	Moncton Wildcats	4–1	Val-d'Or Foreurs	Centre Agnico Eagle	Recap

Moncton wins series 4 – 0

=== (2) Chicoutimi Saguenéens vs. (9) Quebec Remparts ===
April 10	Quebec Remparts	1–3	Chicoutimi Saguenéens	Centre Georges-Vézina	Recap

April 11	Quebec Remparts	1–3	Chicoutimi Saguenéens	Centre Georges-Vézina	Recap

April 13	Chicoutimi Saguenéens	4–0	Quebec Remparts	Centre Vidéotron	Recap

April 15	Chicoutimi Saguenéens	5–0	Quebec Remparts	Centre Vidéotron	Recap

Chicoutimi wins series 4 – 0

=== (3) Rouyn-Noranda Huskies vs. (7) Shawinigan Cataractes ===
April 10	Shawinigan Cataractes	3–8	Rouyn-Noranda Huskies	Aréna Glencore	Recap

April 11	Shawinigan Cataractes	5–6	OT	Rouyn-Noranda Huskies	Aréna Glencore	Recap

April 14	Rouyn-Noranda Huskies	3–2	Shawinigan Cataractes	Centre Gervais Auto	Recap

April 15	Rouyn-Noranda Huskies	4–2	Shawinigan Cataractes	Centre Gervais Auto	Recap

Rouyn-Noranda wins series 4 – 0

=== (4) Blainville-Boisbriand Armada vs. (6) Newfoundland Regiment ===
April 9	Newfoundland Regiment	4–1	Blainville-Boisbriand Armada	Centre d'Excellence Sports Rousseau	Recap

April 10	Newfoundland Regiment	3–5	Blainville-Boisbriand Armada	Centre d'Excellence Sports Rousseau	Recap

April 13	Blainville-Boisbriand Armada	4–1	Newfoundland Regiment	Mary Brown's Centre	Recap

April 14	Blainville-Boisbriand Armada	4–5	Newfoundland Regiment	Mary Brown's Centre	Recap

April 17	Blainville-Boisbriand Armada	3–0	Newfoundland Regiment	Mary Brown's Centre	Recap

April 19	Newfoundland Regiment	3–5	Blainville-Boisbriand Armada	Centre d'Excellence Sports Rousseau	Recap

Blainville-Boisbriand wins series 4–2

== Semifinals ==
=== (1) Moncton Wildcats vs. (4) Blainville-Boisbriand Armada ===
April 23	Blainville-Boisbriand Armada	3–2	4OT	Moncton Wildcats	Avenir Centre	Recap

April 25	Blainville-Boisbriand Armada	4–5	Moncton Wildcats	Avenir Centre	Recap

April 27	Moncton Wildcats	6–2	Blainville-Boisbriand Armada	Centre d'Excellence Sports Rousseau	Recap

April 28	Moncton Wildcats	2–3	Blainville-Boisbriand Armada	Centre d'Excellence Sports Rousseau	Recap

May 1	Blainville-Boisbriand Armada	2–6	Moncton Wildcats	Avenir Centre	Recap

May 3	Moncton Wildcats	2–3	Blainville-Boisbriand Armada	Centre d'Excellence Sports Rousseau	Recap

May 5	Blainville-Boisbriand Armada	2–6	Moncton Wildcats	Avenir Centre	Recap

Moncton wins series 4 – 3

=== (2) Chicoutimi Saguenéens vs. (3) Rouyn-Noranda Huskies ===
April 24	Rouyn-Noranda Huskies	3–1	Chicoutimi Saguenéens	Centre Georges-Vézina	Recap

April 25	Rouyn-Noranda Huskies	2–5	Chicoutimi Saguenéens	Centre Georges-Vézina	Recap

April 28	Chicoutimi Saguenéens	4–3	Rouyn-Noranda Huskies	Aréna Glencore	Recap

April 29	Chicoutimi Saguenéens	3–4	Rouyn-Noranda Huskies	Aréna Glencore	Recap

May 1	Rouyn-Noranda Huskies	0–4	Chicoutimi Saguenéens	Centre Georges-Vézina	Recap

May 3	Chicoutimi Saguenéens	6–3	Rouyn-Noranda Huskies	Aréna Glencore	Recap

Chicoutimi wins series 4 – 2

== Gilles-Courteau Trophy championship ==
=== (1) Moncton Wildcats vs. (2) Chicoutimi Saguenéens ===
May 8	Chicoutimi Saguenéens	2–5	Moncton Wildcats	Avenir Centre	Recap

May 9	Chicoutimi Saguenéens	3–2	Moncton Wildcats	Avenir Centre	Recap

May 12	Moncton Wildcats	4–5	OT	Chicoutimi Saguenéens	Centre Georges-Vézina	Recap

May 13	Moncton Wildcats	4–3	Chicoutimi Saguenéens	Centre Georges-Vézina	Recap

May 15	Chicoutimi Saguenéens	7–6	Moncton Wildcats	Avenir Centre	Recap

May 17	Moncton Wildcats	1–5	Chicoutimi Saguenéens	Centre Georges-Vézina	Recap

Chicoutimi wins series 4 – 2

== Playoff scoring leaders ==
Note: GP = Games played; G = Goals; A = Assists; Pts = Points; PIM = Penalties minutes

Player	Team	GP	G	A	Pts	PIM
Gabe Smith	Moncton Wildcats	21	19	14	33	12
Teddy Mutryn	Moncton Wildcats	21	10	20	30	14
Tommy Bleyl	Moncton Wildcats	21	6	22	28	6
Caleb Desnoyers	Moncton Wildcats	21	7	18	25	16
Maxim Massé	Chicoutimi Saguenéens	20	6	18	24	6
Mavrick Lachance	Chicoutimi Saguenéens	20	10	13	23	12
Thomas Verdon	Rouyn-Noranda Huskies	17	8	14	22	14
Justin Carbonneau	Blainville-Boisbriand Armada	17	9	11	20	14
Nathan Lecompte	Chicoutimi Saguenéens	20	7	13	20	4
Benjamin Brunelle	Rouyn-Noranda Huskies	17	11	8	19	10

== Playoff leading goaltenders ==
Note: GP = Games played; Mins = Minutes played; W = Wins; L = Losses: OTL = Overtime losses; SL = Shootout losses; GA = Goals Allowed; SO = Shutouts; GAA = Goals against average

Player	Team	GP	Mins	W	L	GA	SO	Sv%	GAA
Lucas Beckman	Chicoutimi Saguenéens	20	1,210:38	16	4	40	3	.918	1.98
Rudy Guimond	Moncton Wildcats	21	1,339:45	14	7	54	1	.910	2.42
Samuel Meloche	Rouyn-Noranda Huskies	17	1,024:24	10	7	43	3	.905	2.52
Kyan Labbé	Sherbrooke Phoenix	7	450:20	3	4	19	0	.925	2.53
Patrick Déniger	Quebec Remparts	10	592:02	4	6	25	1	.902	2.53

== Trophies and awards ==
2025–26 QMJHL Awards
Award	Recipient(s)	Ref
Gilles-Courteau Trophy; Playoff champions	Chicoutimi Saguenéens	
Jean Rougeau Trophy; Regular season champions	Moncton Wildcats	
Luc Robitaille Trophy; Team with the best goals for average	Chicoutimi Saguenéens	
Robert Lebel Trophy; Team with the best goals against average	Chicoutimi Saguenéens	
Michel Brière Memorial Trophy; Regular season MVP	Maxim Massé (Chicoutimi Saguenéens)	
Jean Béliveau Trophy; Top point scorer	Maxim Massé (Chicoutimi Saguenéens)	
Mario Lemieux Trophy; Top goal scorer	Justin Carbonneau (Blainville-Boisbriand Armada)	
Guy Lafleur Trophy; Playoff MVP	Gabe Smith (Moncton Wildcats)	
Patrick Roy Trophy; Goaltender of the Year	Rudy Guimond (Moncton Wildcats)	
Jacques Plante Memorial Trophy; Goaltender with best goals against average	Rudy Guimond (Moncton Wildcats)	
Guy Carbonneau Trophy; Best Defensive Forward	Gabe Smith (Moncton Wildcats)	
Emile Bouchard Trophy; Defenceman of the Year	Tommy Bleyl (Moncton Wildcats)	
Kevin Lowe Trophy; Best Defensive Defenceman	Félix Plamondon (Shawinigan Cataractes)	
Michael Bossy Trophy; Top Prospect	Maddox Dagenais (Québec Remparts)	
Sidney Crosby Trophy; Rookie of the Year	Tommy Bleyl (Moncton Wildcats)	
Michel Bergeron Trophy; Offensive Rookie of the Year	Egor Shilov (Victoriaville Tigres)	
Raymond Lagacé Trophy; Defensive Rookie of the Year	Tommy Bleyl (Moncton Wildcats)	
David Desharnais Trophy; Most Sportsmanlike Player	Alex Huang (Chicoutimi Saguenéens)	
QMJHL Humanitarian of the Year; Humanitarian of the Year	Marcus Kearsey (Charlottetown Islanders)	
Marcel Robert Trophy; Best Scholastic Player	Nathan Brisson (Val-d'Or Foreurs)	
Paul Dumont Trophy; Personality of the Year	Glenn Stanford (Newfoundland Regiment)	
Ron Lapointe Trophy; Coach of the Year	Sylvain Favreau (Drummondville Voltigeurs)	
Maurice Filion Trophy; General Manager of the Year	Yanick Jean (Chicoutimi Saguenéens)	

=== All-Star teams ===
First All-Star Team:

- Rudy Guimond, Goaltender, Moncton Wildcats
- Tommy Bleyl, Defenceman, Moncton Wildcats
- Alex Huang, Defenceman, Chicoutimi Saguenéens
- Maxim Massé, Chicoutimi Saguenéens
- Caleb Desnoyers, Forward, Moncton Wildcats
- Thomas Verdon, Forward, Rouyn-Noranda Huskies

Second All-Star Team

- William Lacelle, Goaltender, Rimouski/Blainville-Boisbriand
- Tomas Lavoie, Defenceman, Cape Breton/Chicoutimi
- Marcus Kearsey, Defenceman, Charlottetown Islanders
- Philippe Veilleux, Forward, Val-d'Or Foreurs
- Justin Carbonneau, Forward, Blainville-Boisbriand Armada
- Nathan Leek, Forward, Charlottetown Islanders

All-Rookie Team

- Jan Larys, Goaltender, Drummondville Voltigeurs
- Tommy Bleyl, Defenceman, Moncton Wildcats
- Malik L’Italien, Defenceman, Halifax Mooseheads
- Egor Shilov, Forward, Victoriaville Tigres
- Alexey Vlasov, Forward, Victoriaville Tigres
- Alexis Joseph, Forward, Saint John Sea Dogs

== See also ==
- List of QMJHL seasons
- 2025–26 OHL season
- 2025–26 WHL season

== Sources ==
- "EDITORIAL: Changes to NCAA, junior hockey will have lasting impact". Rocky Mountain Outlook. Great West Media. December 2, 2024.

Preceded by 2024–25 QMJHL season	QMJHL seasons	Succeeded by 2026–27 QMJHL season
