= Rookie of the Year (award) =

Award given by various sports organizations

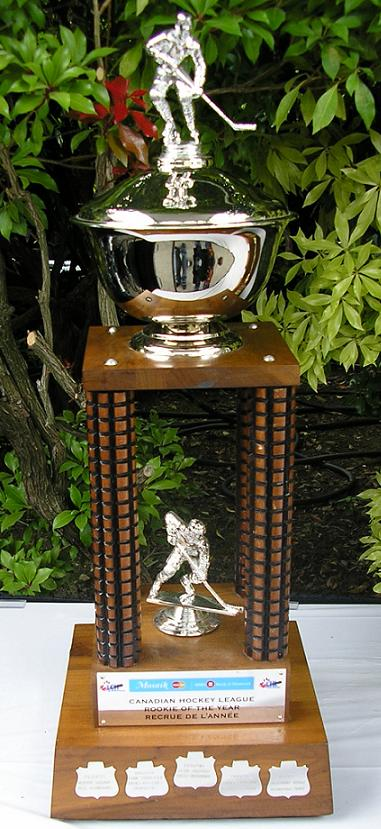
2007 Rookie of the Year Award trophy

A Rookie of the Year award or ROY is given by a number of sports leagues to the top-performing athlete in their first season within the league. Athletes competing for the first time in any given league are also known as "rookies". The method of giving out the award varies by league with many team sports giving the award based on a subjective vote of selected people, While many individual sports may give the award on more objective criteria such as awarding it to the top finishing rookie athlete based on end of season standings or their finish in a specific event.

== Principal leagues ==
The honor is awarded annually to the top rookie performers in leagues in countries such as the United States and Canada:

- Canadian Football League
- MotoGP
- Indianapolis 500
- IndyCar
- Major League Baseball
- Major League Lacrosse
- Major League Soccer
- NASCAR
- National Basketball Association
- National Football League
- National Hockey League
- Women's Professional Soccer
- Formula 2 (as the Anthoine Hubert Award)

== Award outside North America ==
Some rookie of the year awards exist outside North America, one example being the Elitserien Rookie of the Year in Swedish ice hockey.

The North American sports development system delays athletes' entry into the top level of professional sports until the best of them are ready to make a major impact in their first season. The typical development path varies by sport:

- American football – Essentially all future professionals spend anywhere from three to five years in college programs, playing for a maximum of four years, before becoming eligible for professional play.
- Canadian football – Similar to American football, with players drawn from both Canadian university programs and U.S. college football.
- Basketball – Almost all American players now spend at least one year in college basketball because of recent changes in NBA rules. Although the NBA has its own minor league, virtually all players in that league come from the college ranks as well.
- Baseball – While college baseball plays a role in player development, it is significantly less than that of the extensive, and fully professional (bordering on semi-professional at the lowest level), minor league baseball system. Almost all players, whether or not they play college baseball, will spend several years in the minors before making a major-league team.
- Hockey – In Canada, a large majority of future NHL players develop as juniors in the professional Canadian Hockey League. While some American players opt for the CHL (which has some American teams), most choose college hockey. In either case, only the very top prospects will graduate immediately from the CHL or NCAA to the NHL; most will spend some time in an NHL team's minor-league system.

However, in other parts of the world, it is usual for clubs to train their own players and introduce them into the first team gradually. Occasionally, young players who show extraordinary talent are introduced to the first team during their teens, with notable examples being Wayne Rooney in association football and Ricky Rubio in basketball.

To reflect this difference Young player of the year awards with an upper age limit usually somewhere in the early 20s, are more common elsewhere, e.g. soccer's FIFPro World Young Player of the Year.

However golf's PGA European Tour has the Sir Henry Cotton Rookie of the Year award, and Grand Prix motorcycle racing also awards the top rookie of each class.

== Sports Rookie of the Year awards ==
=== Association football ===
- PFA Young Player of the Year
- Premier League Young Player of the Season
- Serie A Young Footballer of the Year
- Ligue 1 Young player of the year
- MLS Young Player of the Year Award
- K League Young Player of the Year Award
- J.League Best Young Player
- A-League Men Young Footballer of the Year
- A-League Women Young Footballer of the Year
- WPS Rookie of the Year Award
- NWSL Rookie of the Year
- Golden Boy

=== Auto racing ===
- Indianapolis 500
- IndyCar
- NASCAR
- Grand Prix motorcycle racing
- Deutsche Tourenwagen Masters

=== Baseball ===
- Major League Baseball (in each league)
- Esurance MLB Awards Best Rookie (in MLB)
- Players Choice Awards Outstanding Rookie (in each league)
- Baseball America
- Baseball Prospectus Internet Baseball Awards
- Sporting News (from 1963 through 2003, there were two categories: Rookie Pitcher of the Year and Rookie Player of the Year)
- Baseball America All-Rookie Team
- Topps All-Star Rookie Team
- MLB Rookie of the Month Award
- Chinese Professional Baseball League (Chinese Taipei: Republic of China)
- Japan Professional Baseball
- Korea Baseball Organization

=== Basketball ===
- National Basketball Association
- NBA Development League Rookie of the Year Award
- WNBA Rookie of the Year Award
- NBL (Australia) Rookie of the Year
- Philippine Basketball Association Rookie of the Year award

=== Football (American) ===
- National Football League

=== Football (Canadian) ===
- Canadian Football League

=== Golf ===
- Ladies European Tour
- LPGA Tour
- PGA Tour
- PGA European Tour

=== Hockey ===
- Canadian Hockey League
- Central Hockey League
- International Hockey League
- National Hockey League
- Quebec Major Junior Hockey League

=== Lacrosse ===
- Major League Lacrosse

=== Rugby league ===
- National Rugby League
- NRL Women's Premiership

=== Professional Wrestling ===
- Stardom Rookie of the Year
- Wrestling Observer Newsletter award
- Young Lion Cup (New Japan Pro Wrestling)
- Young Lions Cup (Chikara)

== See also ==
- Most Valuable Player
