= Sidney Crosby Trophy =

Quebec Maritimes Junior Hockey League player award

The Sidney Crosby Trophy is awarded annually by the Quebec Maritimes Junior Hockey League (QMJHL) to the overall Rookie of the Year. The Cup was known as the Molson Cup from 1991 to 1994, and the New Face Cup from 1994 to 1996. From 1996 to 2025 the award was known as the RDS Cup and was sponsored by the French-language sports network Réseau des sports (RDS). In 2025, the award was renamed to honour Sidney Crosby.

== Winners ==
Season	Player	Team
Molson Cup
1991–92	Alexandre Daigle	Victoriaville Tigres
1992–93	Ian Laperrière	Drummondville Voltigeurs
1992–93	Martin Lapointe	Laval Titan
1993–94	Christian Matte	Granby Bisons
New Face Cup
1994–95	Steve Brûlé	Saint-Jean Lynx
1995–96	not awarded	
RDS Cup
1996–97	Vincent Lecavalier	Rimouski Océanic
1997–98	Mike Ribeiro	Rouyn-Noranda Huskies
1998–99	Ladislav Nagy	Halifax Mooseheads
1999–2000	Chris Montgomery	Montreal Rocket
2000–01	Pierre-Marc Bouchard	Chicoutimi Saguenéens
2001–02	Benoît Mondou	Baie-Comeau Drakkar
2002–03	Petr Vrána	Halifax Mooseheads
2003–04	Sidney Crosby	Rimouski Océanic
2004–05	Derick Brassard	Drummondville Voltigeurs
2005–06	Ondřej Pavelec	Cape Breton Screaming Eagles
2006–07	Jakub Voráček	Halifax Mooseheads
2007–08	Olivier Roy	Cape Breton Screaming Eagles
2008–09	Dmitry Kulikov	Drummondville Voltigeurs
2009–10	Petr Straka	Rimouski Océanic
2010–11	Charles Hudon	Chicoutimi Saguenéens
2011–12	Mikhail Grigorenko	Quebec Remparts
2012–13	Valentin Zykov	Baie-Comeau Drakkar
2013–14	Nikolaj Ehlers	Halifax Mooseheads
2014–15	Dmytro Timashov	Quebec Remparts
2015–16	Vitalii Abramov	Gatineau Olympiques
2016–17	Nico Hischier	Halifax Mooseheads
2017–18	Alexis Lafrenière	Rimouski Océanic
2018–19	Jordan Spence	Moncton Wildcats
2019–20	Zachary Bolduc	Rimouski Océanic
2020–21	Tristan Luneau	Gatineau Olympiques
2021–22	Jakub Brabenec	Charlottetown Islanders
2022–23	Maxim Massé	Chicoutimi Saguenéens
2023–24	Émile Guité	Chicoutimi Saguenéens
Sidney Crosby Trophy
2024–25	Matvei Gridin	Shawinigan Cataractes
2025–26	Tommy Bleyl	Moncton Wildcats
