= Alexis Joseph =

Canadian ice hockey player (born 2006)

- Born: June 16, 2009 (age 17) Lachenaie, Quebec, Canada
- Height: 6 ft 4 in (193 cm)
- Weight: 203 lb (92 kg; 14 st 7 lb)
- Position: Centre
- Shoots: Left
- QMJHL team: Saint John Sea Dogs
- NHL draft: Eligible 2027

Alexis Joseph (born June 16, 2009) is a Canadian junior ice hockey player for the Saint John Sea Dogs of the Quebec Maritimes Junior Hockey League (QMJHL) He is considered a top prospect eligible for the 2027 NHL entry draft.

== Playing career ==
In July 2025, Joseph was drafted first overall by the Saint John Sea Dogs in the 2025 QMJHL draft. During the 2025–26 season, in his first year with the Sea Dogs, he recorded 24 goals and 36 assists in 54 games. He ranked second on the team in scoring and led all rookies with four shorthanded goals. Following the season he was named to the QMJHL All-Rookie team.

== International play ==
Joseph represented Canada Red at the 2025 World U-17 Hockey Challenge where he served as captain and recorded six goals and seven assists in five games and won a gold medal. He led the tournament in scoring with 13 points and was named to the tournament All-Star team.

He represented Canada at the 2026 IIHF World U18 Championships and was scoreless in two games. On August 1, 2026, he was named an assistant captain for Canada at the 2026 Hlinka Gretzky Cup. Joseph, along with Landon DuPont, were the only two players selected to represent Canada at both the 2026 IIHF World U18 Championships and Hlinka Gretzky Cup. During the Hlinka Gretzky Cup he recorded one goal and two assists in five games and won a gold medal.

== Career statistics ==
=== Regular season and playoffs ===
			Regular season					Playoffs
Season	Team	League	GP	G	A	Pts	PIM	GP	G	A	Pts	PIM
2025–26	Saint John Sea Dogs	QMJHL	54	24	36	60	38	4	0	3	3	2
QMJHL totals			54	24	36	60	38	4	0	3	3	2

=== International ===
Year	Team	Event	Result	GP	G	A	Pts	PIM
2026	Canada	HG18	1st place, gold medalist(s)	5	1	2	3	0
2026	Canada	U18	6th	2	0	0	0	0
Junior totals				7	1	2	3	0

== Awards and honours ==
Award	Year
QMJHL
All-Rookie Team	2026
