= Two-way forward =

Ice hockey forward known for their defensive skills

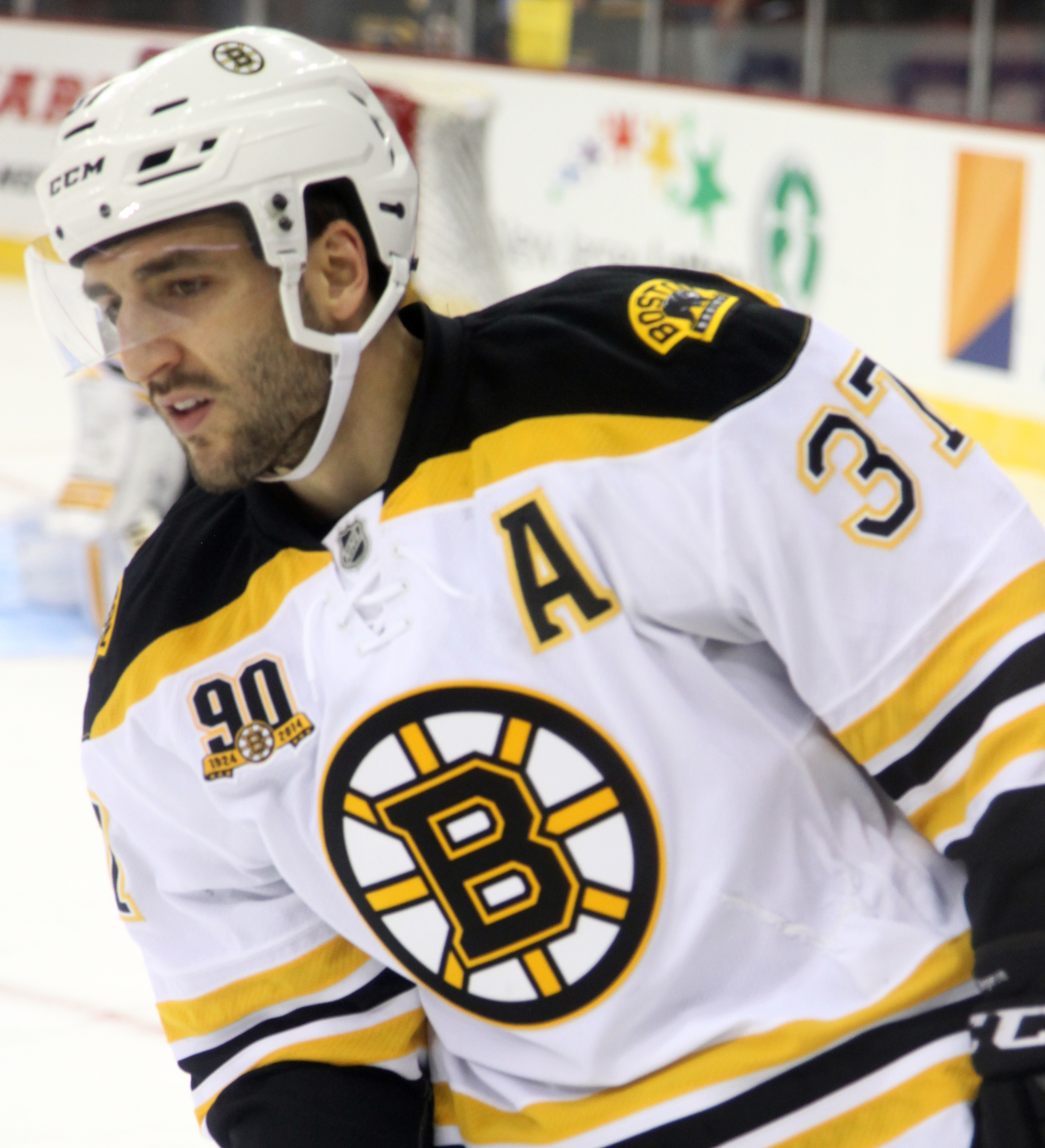
Patrice Bergeron won the Frank J. Selke Trophy as the NHL's best defensive forward a record six times, and was a finalist every year from 2012 to 2023

In ice hockey, a two-way forward is a forward who handles the defensive aspects of the game as well as the offensive aspects. Typically, a player's frame is not an issue in whether he can be a two-way forward. Perseverance is key to being a two-way forward, as it is an attribute that gives rise to battling in the corners or preventing odd man rushes by the opposing team. A two-way forward can contribute for the team both offensively and defensively, scoring important game-winning goals or making big plays from which his team receives a significant advantage over the opponent team. As such, good two-way forwards are often capable playmakers.

Two-way forwards that do not have top offensive numbers are sometimes left in the shadows of high-scoring forwards and so are rarely named to all-star games or all-star teams, but commentators often reiterate their importance to a team. The National Hockey League (NHL) presents its best two-way forward with the Frank J. Selke Trophy, awarded to the forward "who demonstrates the most skill in the defensive component of the game."

== Active winners and nominees of the Selke Trophy ==
- Jordan Staal, Carolina Hurricanes. Nominated in 2010 and 2024.
- Anže Kopitar, Los Angeles Kings. Won in 2016 and 2018; Nominated in 2014 and 2015.
- Ryan O'Reilly, Nashville Predators. Won in 2019.
- Mark Stone, Vegas Golden Knights. Nominated in 2019 and 2021.
- Sean Couturier, Philadelphia Flyers. Won in 2020.
- Aleksander Barkov, Florida Panthers. Won in 2021, 2024, and 2025; Nominated in 2022.
- Nick Suzuki, Montreal Canadiens. Won in 2026.
- Elias Lindholm, Boston Bruins. Nominated in 2022.
- Nico Hischier, New Jersey Devils. Nominated in 2023.
- Mitch Marner, Toronto Maple Leafs. Nominated in 2023.
- Auston Matthews, Toronto Maple Leafs. Nominated in 2024.
- Anthony Cirelli, Tampa Bay Lightning. Nominated in 2025.
- Sam Reinhart, Florida Panthers. Nominated in 2025.

== See also ==
- Two-way player
- 200-foot game
