= Nico Hischier =

Swiss ice hockey player (born 1999)

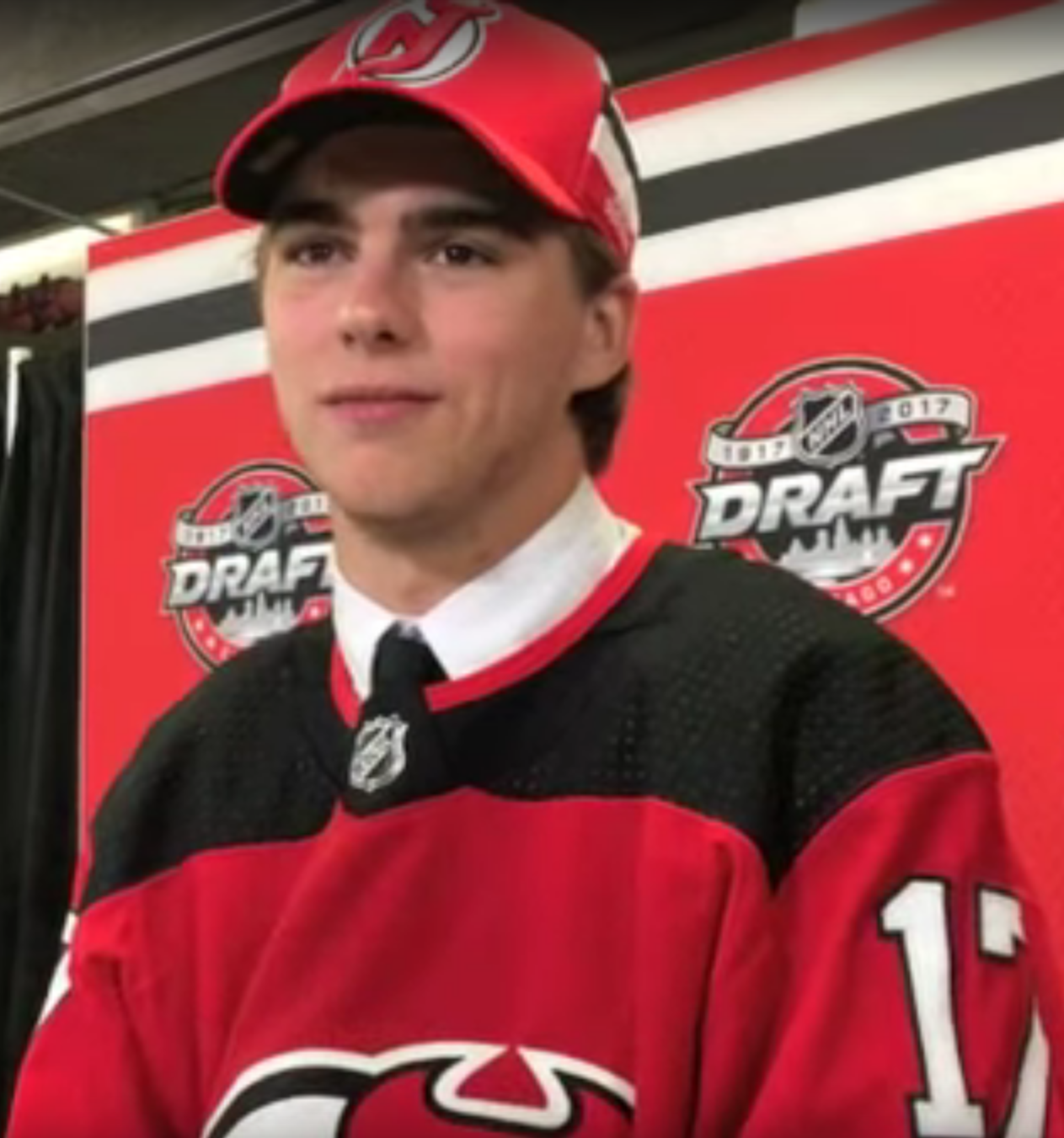
- Hischier at the 2017 NHL entry draft
- Born: 4 January 1999 (age 27) Brig, Switzerland
- Height: 6 ft 1 in (185 cm)
- Weight: 200 lb (91 kg; 14 st 4 lb)
- Position: Centre
- Shoots: Left
- NHL team Former teams: New Jersey Devils; SC Bern
- National team: Switzerland
- NHL draft: 1st overall, 2017; New Jersey Devils
- Playing career: 2015–present

Nico Hischier (born 4 January 1999) is a Swiss professional ice hockey player who is a centre and captain for the New Jersey Devils of the National Hockey League (NHL). Hischier made his professional debut in his native Switzerland in 2015, spending time both in the top-tier National League A (NLA) and the second-tier National League B. He moved to North America for the 2016–17 season to play major junior hockey for the Halifax Mooseheads of the Quebec Major Junior Hockey League (QMJHL) in hopes of furthering his hockey career; in his first season in the QMJHL, he was named rookie of the year, along with the award for best rookie in the Canadian Hockey League (CHL), the governing body for major junior hockey in Canada. Internationally Hischier has represented Switzerland at several junior tournaments, including two World Junior Championships. Regarded as a strong two-way forward and a top prospect for the 2017 NHL entry draft, Hischier was selected first overall by the Devils, the first time a Swiss player was selected first overall, and made his NHL debut in 2017. He was named captain of the Devils in 2021.

== Playing career ==
=== Switzerland and major junior ===
Hischier participated in the 2011 and 2012 Quebec International Pee-Wee Hockey Tournaments with a youth team from Zürich. He grew up playing in the EHC Visp program. At the age of 15, he moved from his native canton of Valais, in the south of Switzerland, to Bern and joined SC Bern, following his brother Luca, who had done the same at that age; this allowed Hischier to play at the top levels of the Swiss under-17 and under-20 leagues. He began the 2015–16 season with EHC Visp, an affiliate of SC Bern, in the National League B, the second-highest Swiss league. However, due to several players being out with injuries in Bern, Hischier was brought to the top team on 13 November that year, playing with his brother. Hischier would play 15 games with Bern, spending most of the season with Visp.

The Halifax Mooseheads, a major junior team in the Quebec Major Junior Hockey League (QMJHL), selected Hischier sixth overall in the 2016 Canadian Hockey League (CHL) Import Draft, conducted between the three Canadian major junior leagues (the QMJHL, the Ontario Hockey League, and the Western Hockey League). After discussions with both Halifax's general manager and Swiss former Mooseheads player Timo Meier, Hischier committed to joining Halifax. Hischier's first season with the Mooseheads saw him finish second to Maxime Fortier for the team scoring lead, and tenth overall in the QMJHL, with 38 goals and 86 points. He also led all QMJHL rookies in both goals and points. For this Hischier was awarded the RDS Cup for being the QMJHL Rookie of the Year and the Michael Bossy Trophy as the best professional prospect in the league. He was additionally named to the QMJHL Rookie All-Star Team. He would also be named the rookie of the year for the CHL, which oversees the three major junior leagues. In the playoffs he led Halifax in scoring with seven points in six games.

Regarded as a top prospect going into the 2017 NHL entry draft, by the conclusion of the season Hischier was regarded as a candidate to be selected first overall. Ranked the second-best North American skater in the NHL Central Scouting Bureau final list prior to the draft, Hischier was highly regarded as a tremendous offensive talent with exceptional hockey sense. Hischier was also regarded as a strong two-way player, and well-regarded for his strong skating abilities. In the lead-up to the draft Hischier was regarded as a consensus top-two pick along with Nolan Patrick.

=== New Jersey Devils ===
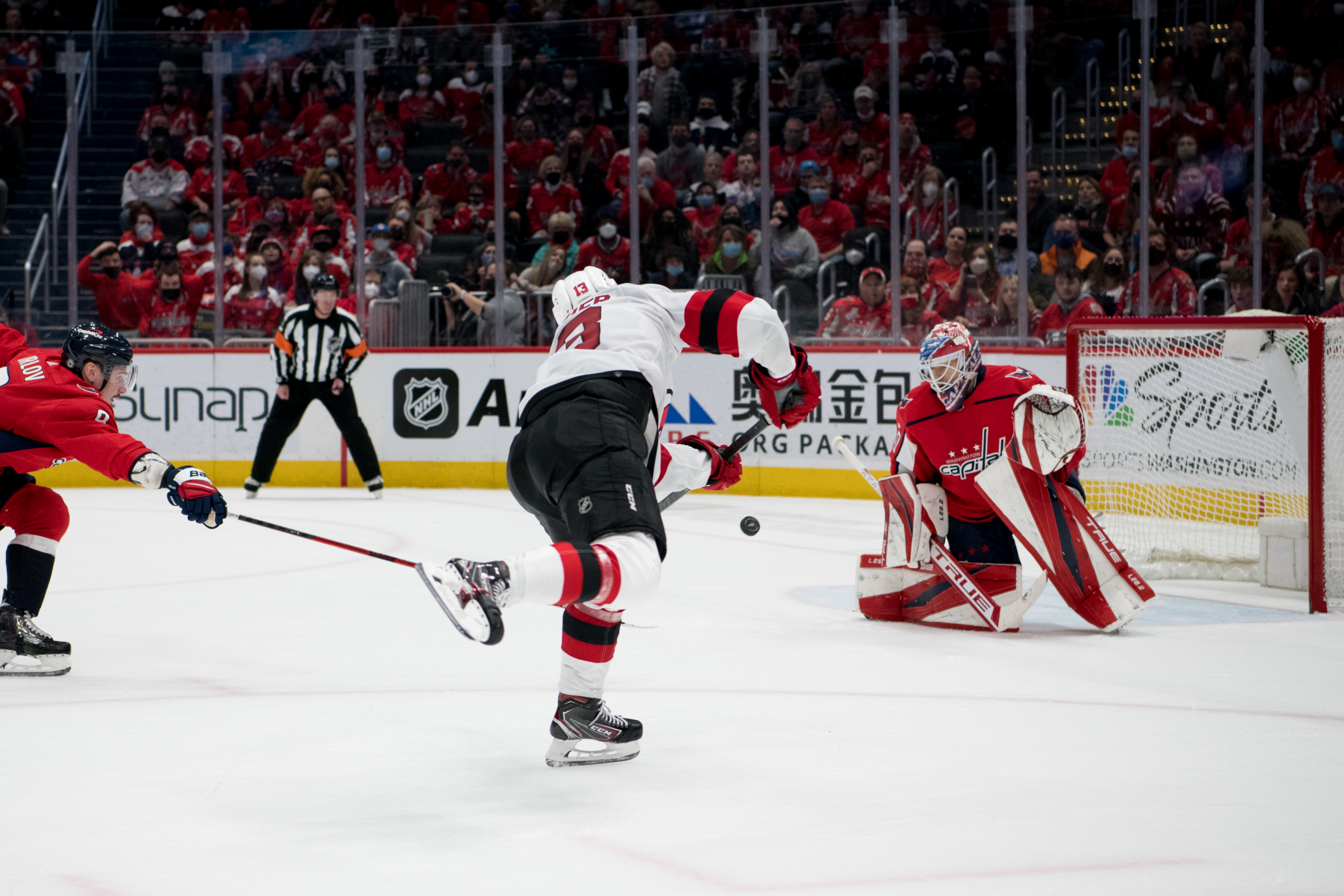
Hischier scoring a game-winning goal against the Washington Capitals in January 2022

Hischier was selected with the first overall pick in the 2017 NHL entry draft by the New Jersey Devils, becoming the first Swiss player to be drafted first overall. He signed a three-year, entry-level contract with the Devils on 15 July 2017. After a strong training camp and preseason, where he led the Devils in scoring with seven points in four games, Hischier made the opening-day roster. His NHL debut came on 7 October against the Colorado Avalanche. He recorded his first point, an assist, on 9 October in his second game, against the Buffalo Sabres, while his first two goals came ten days later against Craig Anderson of the Ottawa Senators. Hischier finished the regular season as the Devils' second best scorer (behind Hart Trophy-winning linemate Taylor Hall) with 52 points, including 20 goals and 32 assists. His performance helped the team secure their first playoff berth since 2012. After the Devils were eliminated from the 2018 Stanley Cup playoffs in five games by the top-seeded Tampa Bay Lightning, Hischier revealed he had been playing with a hand injury that kept him out of the 2018 IIHF World Championship.

In his sophomore season with the Devils, Hischier completed the 2018–19 season with 47 points in 69 games. With an injured Hall out of the lineup for a large portion of the season, he recorded a team leading Corsi-For percentage, scoring chances for percentage, and high-danger chances for percentage. Despite this, the Devils performed poorly as a team and missed the 2019 Stanley Cup playoffs.

Prior to the 2019–20 season, Hischier played with the Swiss Ice Hockey Federation national team prospects camp. On 16 October 2019, the Devils announced Hischier suffered an upper-body injury during a game against the Florida Panthers. Two days later, the Devils signed Hischier to a seven-year, $50.75 million contract extension, despite the ability to become a restricted free agent. The Devils' performance woes continued through 2019–20, and saw Hischier's linemate Hall traded from the team. The season was shortened by the COVID-19 pandemic; having finished in the bottom seven teams at the time of the regular season's pause and eventual cancellation, the Devils were eliminated from playoff contention by default. Hischier played a total of 58 of the team's 69 games, scoring a total of 14 goals and 36 points in the abbreviated season.

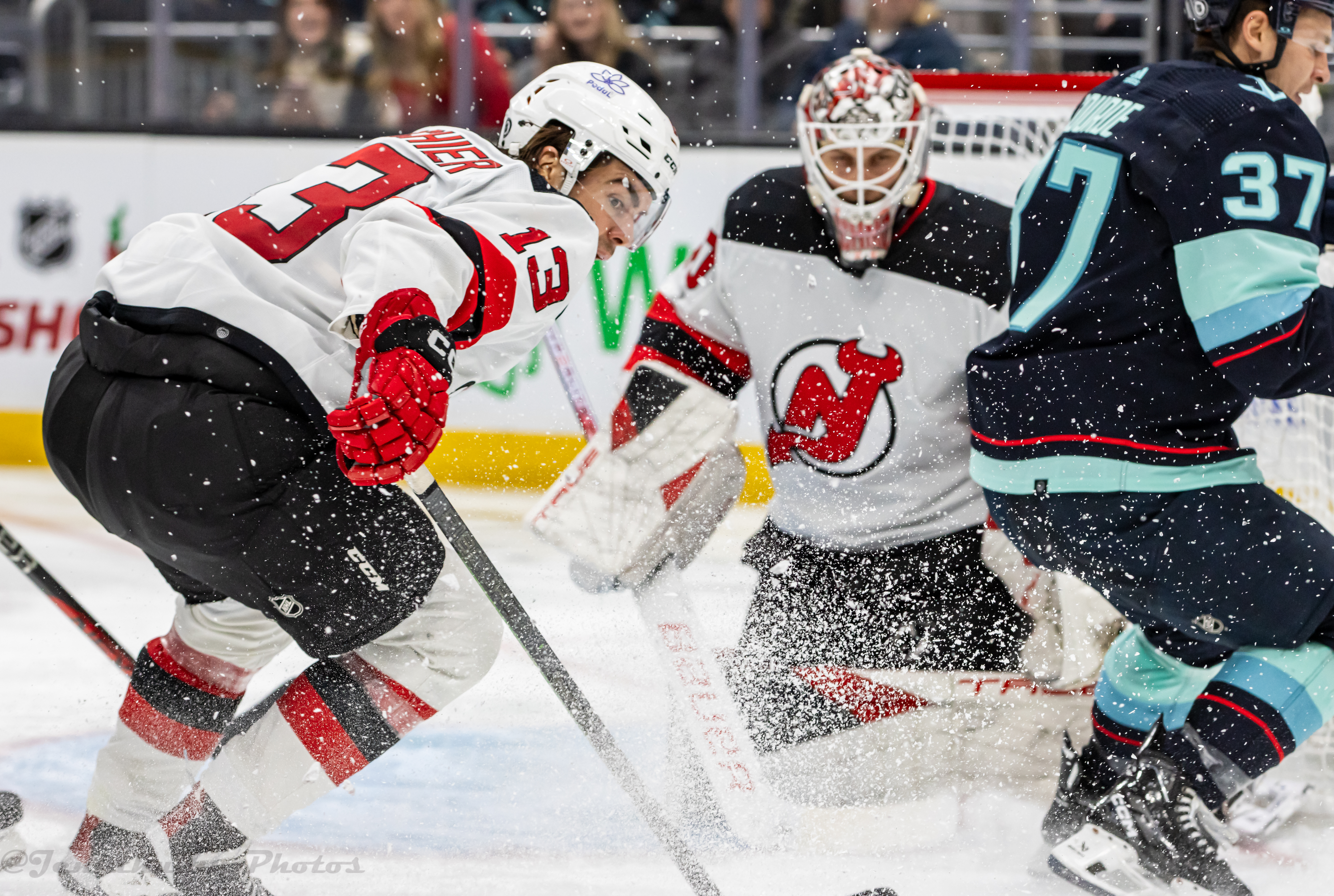
Hischier in action against the Seattle Kraken in 2023

Due to a leg injury suffered prior to training camp, Hischier missed the start of the 2020–21 season. Hischier made his season debut on 20 February 2021, against the Buffalo Sabres, where he was announced as the 12th captain in the Devils' history before the game. As such, he became the youngest captain in the league. Hischier would play only five games before suffering another injury against the Washington Capitals when a shot from Devils defenceman P. K. Subban hit Hischier in the face. Although the injury initially only projected him to miss three weeks of NHL action, the surgery for Hischier's broken nose ended up sidelining him a total of 24 games. Despite playing only 21 games that season, he would finish with six goals and five assists as the Devils once again missed the playoffs.

In the 2022–23 season, Hischier put up a career high 31 goals, 49 assists, and 80 points, which was second to Jack Hughes for most points on the team. Hischier was nominated for the Frank J. Selke Trophy, which is an award for the "forward who demonstrates the most skill in the defensive component of the game."

On 27 October 2023, Hischier suffered an upper-body injury resulting from a check to the head by Buffalo Sabres defenceman Connor Clifton. Clifton received a match penalty and a two-game suspension.

On 25 November 2024, Hischier recorded his first NHL hat trick, which was a natural hat trick, in a 5–2 win against the Nashville Predators.

On 1 July 2026, Hischier signed a five-year, $58.5 million extension beginning in the 2027–28 season with the Devils.

== International play ==
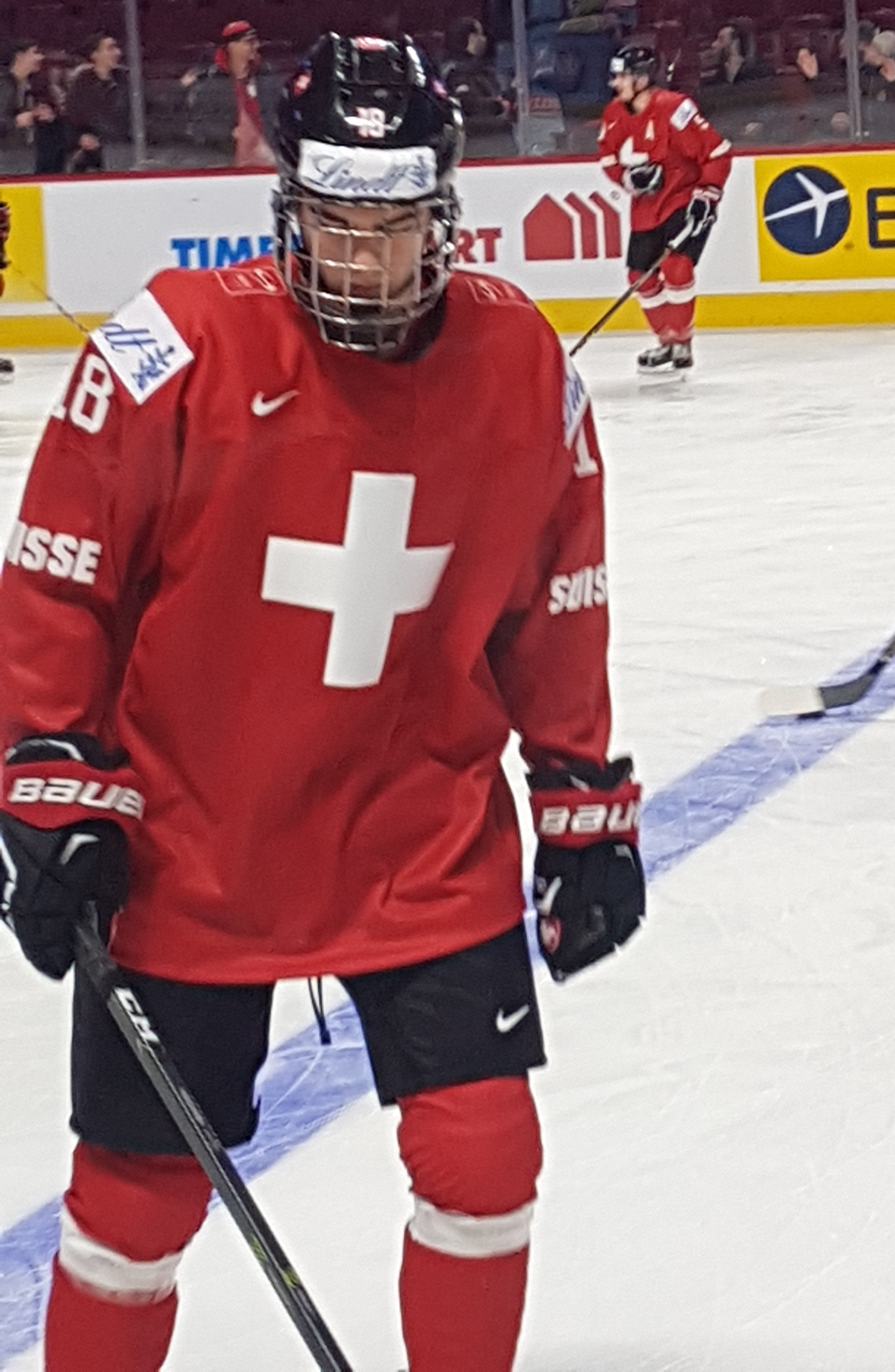
- Hischier at the 2017 World Junior Championships

Medal record

Men's ice hockey

Representing Switzerland

World Championships
Silver medal – second place	2024 Czech Republic	
Silver medal – second place	2025 Sweden/Denmark	
Silver medal – second place	2026 Switzerland	

Hischier's international debut was at the 2015 World U18 Championships, where he scored one goal as the Switzerland under-18 team finished fourth overall. He next played in the 2015 Ivan Hlinka Memorial Tournament, a tournament not regulated by the International Ice Hockey Federation (IIHF), but still considered a major event for under-18 players; Hischier recorded six points in four games. At the 2016 World U18 Championships he had four points as Switzerland placed eighth.

At the 2016 World Junior Championships Hischier was the youngest player for Switzerland junior team, and the second-youngest player overall. He also participated in the 2017 World Juniors, scoring four goals and had seven total points in five games, the most by any player eligible for the 2017 NHL entry draft. He also played in the 2017 World U18 Championships, and finished with six points in five games as Switzerland lost in the quarterfinals.

Hischier was selected to represent Switzerland senior team in the 2019 World Championship. In Switzerland's 9–0 win over Italy senior team, he recorded one goal and two assists. Hischier ended the tournament with nine points in eight games.

He represented Switzerland at the 2024 World Championship and won a silver medal.

Hischier was captain of Switzerland's team at the 2025 World Championship. He was injured during a group stage game against Germany and was unable to finish the tournament. The Swiss team went on to win silver medals.

On 7 January 2026, Hischier was selected to play for Switzerland at the 2026 Winter Olympics.

== Playing style ==
Described as a well-rounded player, capable of offence and strong defence, Hischier has been compared to former NHL player Pavel Datsyuk, who was renowned as a skilled two-way forward. Hischier himself has made the comparison, and has stated that he models his own style after Datsyuk, even wearing the same number, 13. After being selected by the Devils, general manager Ray Shero cited both Hischier's speed and commitment to defence as reasons for picking him first overall, seeing it as ideal for the team. Head coach John Hynes, speaking after the draft, commended Hischier on "how he competes on the puck and his speed, skill set and hockey sense," saying they were already "at an NHL level."

== Personal life ==
Hischier comes from a family of athletes; his father Rino played football for FC Naters and his mother Katja worked as a sports teacher. He is the youngest of three siblings, with an older brother, Luca, and sister, Nina. Luca plays for Genève-Servette HC in the Swiss National League, while Nina played volleyball at a high level in Switzerland. There were no rinks in Naters, so Katja took both her sons to nearby Visp to learn to skate and they discovered hockey there. Hischier also played football until he was 12, but followed Luca and focused exclusively on hockey. Hischier is an avid supporter of Premier League club Manchester City F.C.

After the 2018–19 season ended, Hischier began his civic military service process in his home country of Switzerland.

== Career statistics ==
=== Regular season and playoffs ===
			Regular season					Playoffs
Season	Team	League	GP	G	A	Pts	PIM	GP	G	A	Pts	PIM
2014–15	Bern U20	Elite Jr. A	11	1	1	2	2	10	3	3	6	0
2015–16	Bern U20	Elite Jr. A	18	11	17	28	6	9	1	8	9	2
2015–16	SC Bern	NLA	15	1	0	1	2	—	—	—	—	—
2015–16	EHC Visp	NLB	7	1	1	2	0	6	2	0	2	8
2016–17	Halifax Mooseheads	QMJHL	57	38	48	86	24	6	3	4	7	0
2017–18	New Jersey Devils	NHL	82	20	32	52	26	5	1	0	1	0
2018–19	New Jersey Devils	NHL	69	17	30	47	24	—	—	—	—	—
2019–20	New Jersey Devils	NHL	58	14	22	36	12	—	—	—	—	—
2020–21	New Jersey Devils	NHL	21	6	5	11	4	—	—	—	—	—
2021–22	New Jersey Devils	NHL	70	21	39	60	17	—	—	—	—	—
2022–23	New Jersey Devils	NHL	81	31	49	80	10	12	1	6	7	2
2023–24	New Jersey Devils	NHL	71	27	40	67	12	—	—	—	—	—
2024–25	New Jersey Devils	NHL	75	35	34	69	20	5	4	0	4	0
2025–26	New Jersey Devils	NHL	82	28	38	66	29	—	—	—	—	—
NHL totals			609	199	289	488	154	22	6	6	12	2

=== International ===
Year	Team	Event	Result	GP	G	A	Pts	PIM
2015	Switzerland	U18	4th	5	1	0	1	0
2015	Switzerland	IH18	7th	4	3	3	6	0
2016	Switzerland	WJC	9th	6	0	2	2	0
2016	Switzerland	U18	8th	5	1	3	4	0
2016	Switzerland	IH18	8th	3	1	1	2	2
2017	Switzerland	WJC	7th	5	4	3	7	2
2017	Switzerland	U18	8th	5	1	5	6	0
2019	Switzerland	WC	8th	8	4	5	9	4
2021	Switzerland	WC	6th	8	2	4	6	2
2022	Switzerland	WC	5th	8	5	3	8	2
2023	Switzerland	WC	5th	4	1	2	3	0
2024	Switzerland	WC	2nd place, silver medalist(s)	10	6	5	11	2
2025	Switzerland	WC	2nd place, silver medalist(s)	4	2	1	3	0
2026	Switzerland	OG	5th	5	1	3	4	0
2026	Switzerland	WC	2nd place, silver medalist(s)	10	6	5	11	2
Junior totals				32	11	17	28	4
Senior totals				57	27	28	55	12

== Awards and honors ==
Award	Year	Ref
QMJHL
RDS Cup	2017	
Michael Bossy Trophy	2017	
Michel Bergeron Trophy	2017	
All-Rookie Team	2017	
CHL
CHL Rookie of the Year	2017	
NHL
E.J. McGuire Award of Excellence	2017	
NHL All-Star Game	2020	

Awards and achievements
Preceded by Auston Matthews	NHL first overall draft pick 2017	Succeeded by Rasmus Dahlin
Preceded by Michael McLeod	New Jersey Devils first-round draft pick 2017	Succeeded by Ty Smith
Preceded by Andy Greene	New Jersey Devils captain 2021–present	Incumbent
