= Anthony Mantha =

Canadian ice hockey player (born 1994)

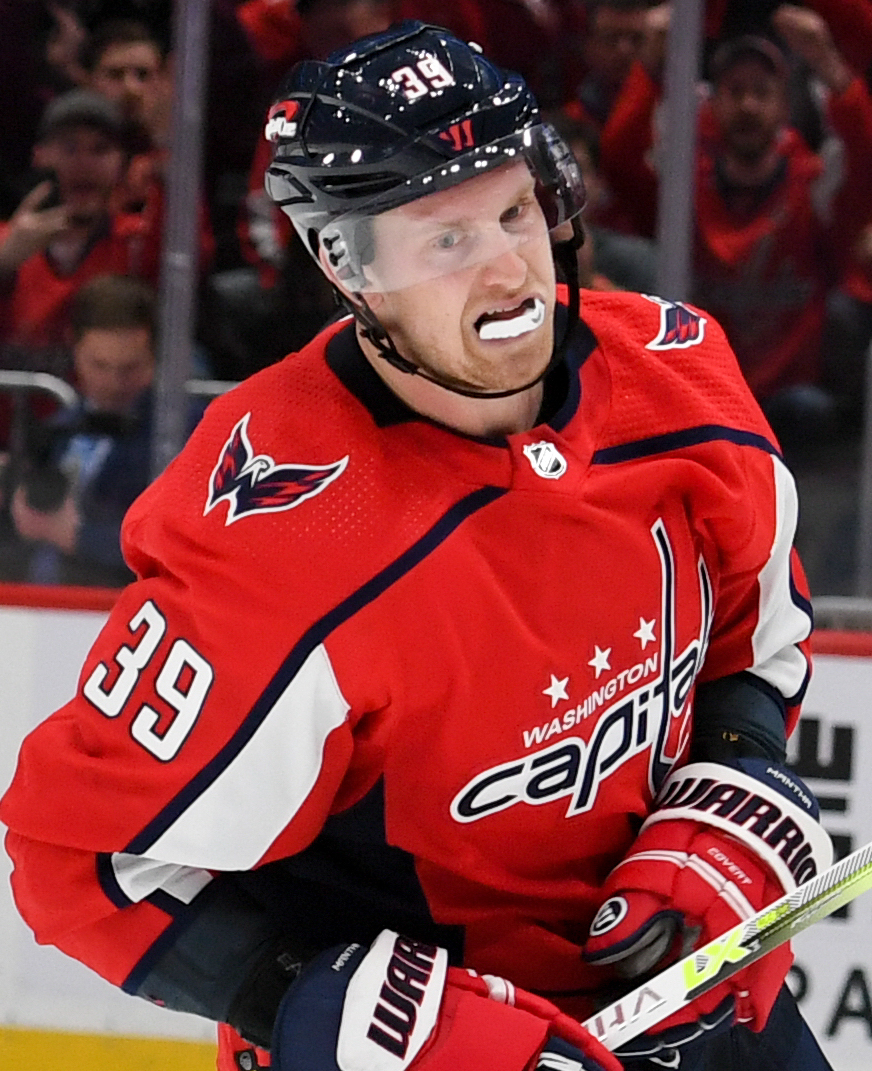
- Mantha with the Washington Capitals in 2022
- Born: September 16, 1994 (age 32) Longueuil, Quebec, Canada
- Height: 6 ft 5 in (196 cm)
- Weight: 240 lb (109 kg; 17 st 2 lb)
- Position: Winger
- Shoots: Left
- NHL team Former teams: New Jersey Devils; Detroit Red Wings; Washington Capitals; Vegas Golden Knights; Calgary Flames; Pittsburgh Penguins
- National team: Canada
- NHL draft: 20th overall, 2013; Detroit Red Wings
- Playing career: 2014–present

Anthony Mantha (born September 16, 1994) is a Canadian professional ice hockey player who is a winger for the New Jersey Devils of the National Hockey League (NHL). Mantha was drafted 20th overall by the Detroit Red Wings in the 2013 NHL entry draft.

== Playing career ==
=== Junior ===
As a youth, Mantha played in the 2007 Quebec International Pee-Wee Hockey Tournament with the Collège-Français Rive-Sud minor ice hockey team. He was drafted 76th overall in the 2010 QMJHL entry draft by the Val-d'Or Foreurs.

During the 2010–11 season, Mantha made his QMJHL debut in December, appearing in two games with Val-d'or, spending most of the season with the College Charles-Lemoyne Riverains in Quebec's midget AAA league.

During the 2011–12 season, Mantha played in 63 games for Val-d'or in his first full year in the QMJHL. Mantha finished with 22 goals and 29 assists.

During the 2012–13 season, Mantha was Val-d'or's second leading scorer, behind Pittsburgh Penguins prospect Anton Zlobin, in his second season with the club. He led the QMJHL with 50 goals and had 39 assists in 67 games and was plus-21. Mantha was rewarded for his outstanding play by being invited to participate in the 2013 CHL Top Prospects Game, and being named to the QMJHL Second All-Star Team.

During the 2013–14 season, Mantha played in 57 games for Val-d'or and led the QMJHL in scoring, finishing with 57 goals and 63 assists. Mantha was awarded the first star of the month for September, where he recorded 14 points in five games, including four goals and an assist in a game against the Quebec Remparts on September 28. Mantha was awarded the first star of the month for October, where he recorded 25 points in 10 games. Mantha recorded back-to-back five-point games on October 11 and 12 against the Sherbrooke Phoenix and Drummondville Voltigeurs. In total, Mantha registered seven games of two points or more. Mantha was rewarded for his outstanding play by earning the Jean Béliveau Trophy as the top scorer in the QMJHL, the Michel Brière Memorial Trophy as the Most Valuable Player in the QMJHL, and the CHL Player of the Year.

During the playoffs, Mantha was the leading scorer for Val-d'or, recording 24 goals and 14 assists in 24 games. Mantha was awarded the CHL player of the week for the playoff period ending May 13, after recording 11 points in the final five games of the QMJHL Finals. Mantha scored the game-winning goal with 52 seconds remaining in the third period of game seven to defeat Baie-Comeau Drakkar and win the President's Cup.

=== Professional ===
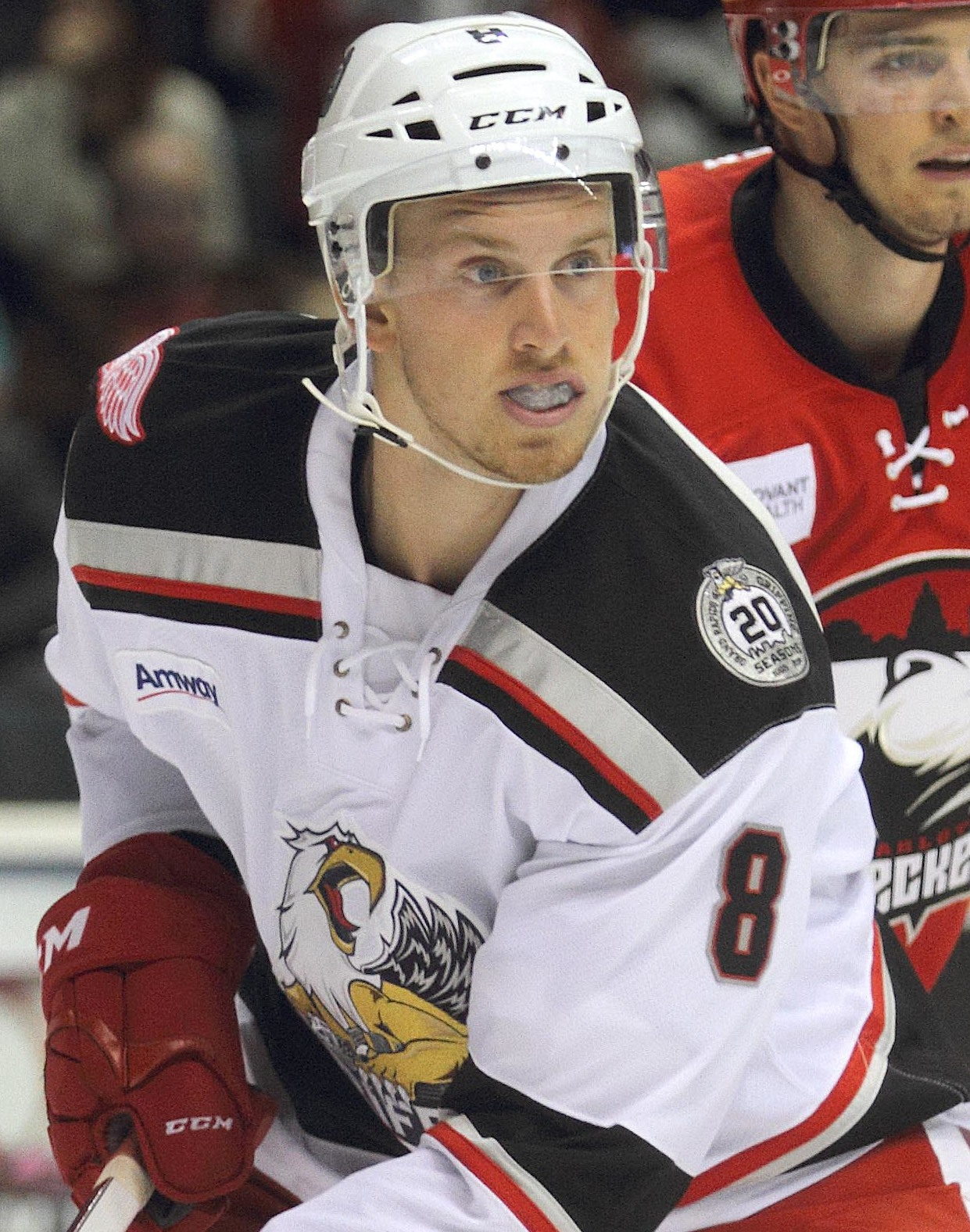
Mantha with the Grand Rapids Griffins in 2015

==== Detroit Red Wings ====
On October 12, 2013, the Detroit Red Wings signed Mantha to a three-year entry-level contract.

Mantha began the 2014–15 season on the injured reserve list, after fracturing his right tibia on September 15, during a game at the Traverse City Prospect Tournament. It was announced he would be out for six to eight weeks. He made his professional debut for the Grand Rapids Griffins on November 14, 2014, in a game against the Texas Stars. He became the second-highest Detroit draft pick to play for the Griffins, behind only Jakub Kindl (19th overall in 2005). In his second AHL game, also against the Texas Stars, he scored his first professional goal against Jussi Rynnäs.

On February 17, 2016, Mantha recorded his first career hat-trick in a game against the Milwaukee Admirals.

On March 14, 2016, Mantha was recalled by the Detroit Red Wings. Prior to being recalled, he ranked third on the Griffins in scoring with 21 goals and 24 assists in 56 games. He made his NHL debut the following day in a game against the Philadelphia Flyers. On March 24, he scored first career NHL goal against Ben Scrivens of the Montreal Canadiens. On April 10, he was returned to the Griffins. Mantha played 10 games for the Red Wings, recording two goals, one assist and 18 shots on goal while averaging 11:42 time on ice.

On November 11, 2016, Mantha was recalled by the Red Wings. Prior to being recalled, he was tied for the AHL lead in goals with eight goals in 10 games. He also led the Griffins in points (10), power-play goals (4) and shots (34).

On October 5, 2017, Mantha scored the first goal at Little Caesars Arena, with an assist from captain Henrik Zetterberg. On March 31, 2019, Mantha recorded his first career NHL hat-trick in a game against the Boston Bruins.

On October 6, 2019, Mantha scored four goals in Detroit's 2019–20 home opener against the Dallas Stars, including a natural hat-trick. He became the second player in franchise history to score four or more goals in a home opener, and the first since John Sorrell in 1933–34. He also became the 23rd different player in franchise history with a four-goal game, and the first since Johan Franzén in 2010–11. Mantha was named NHL's Second Star of the Week on October 8, 2019.

On November 3, 2020, the Red Wings signed Mantha to a four-year, $22.8 million contract.

==== Washington Capitals ====
On April 12, 2021, Mantha was traded to the Washington Capitals in exchange for Jakub Vrána, Richard Pánik, a first-round pick in 2021 and second-round pick in 2022.

On April 18, 2021, Mantha became the first Washington Capital in history to score a goal in each of his first four games with the club.

On December 13, 2022, Mantha assisted on Alexander Ovechkin's 800th career goal, making Ovechkin the third player in NHL history to reach 800 career goals.

==== Vegas Golden Knights ====
On March 5, 2024, Mantha was traded to the Vegas Golden Knights in exchange for a 2024 second-round and a 2026 fourth-round pick.

==== Calgary Flames ====
In an interview with RDS on June 18, 2024, Mantha confirmed that he would not re-sign with the Golden Knights. He subsequently signed a one-year, $3.5 million contract with the Calgary Flames on July 1, 2024. He achieved a Gordie Howe hat trick in a 6–5 season-opening overtime win over the Vancouver Canucks at Rogers Arena on October 9. He had a short-handed goal and a fight with J. T. Miller both within the last five minutes of the first period and assisted on a Martin Pospíšil goal in the third. Mantha injured his ACL after being checked by Canadiens forward Emil Heineman on November 5. The team announced on November 11 that he would miss the remainder of the season after undergoing surgery.

==== Pittsburgh Penguins ====
On July 2, 2025, Mantha signed a one-year, $2.5 million contract with the Pittsburgh Penguins, with an additional $2m in potential bonuses added to the contract.

==== New Jersey Devils ====
On July 15, 2026, Mantha was signed to a two-year, $9.5 million contract with the New Jersey Devils.

== International play ==
Medal record

Men's ice hockey

Representing Canada

World Championships
Silver medal – second place	2019 Slovakia	

World U18 Championships
Bronze medal – third place	2012 Czech Republic	

In 2012, Mantha represented team Canada under-18 team at the World U18 Championships, where he won a bronze medal. Mantha recorded one goal in seven games.

In 2014, Mantha represented team Canada junior team at the World Junior Championships. Mantha was the leading-scorer for Canada, recording five goals and six assists in seven games, and was named to the 2014 WJC All-Star Team.

On April 29, 2019, Mantha was named to the Canada senior team's roster for the 2019 World Championship. He helped Canada progress through to the playoff rounds before losing the final to Finland to finish with the silver medal on May 26. Mantha finished the tournament, tied for first in scoring alongside Mark Stone, with 14 points in 9 games and was selected as a top 3 player for Canada.

== Personal life ==
Mantha's grandfather was four-time Stanley Cup winner Andre Pronovost.

His older sister, Elizabeth Mantha, became one of the first 10 female officials in American Hockey League (AHL) history in October 2021, when she refereed a game between the Laval Rocket and Rochester Americans.

Mantha and his wife were married in June 2023. They have three children.

== Career statistics ==
=== Regular season and playoffs ===
			Regular season					Playoffs
Season	Team	League	GP	G	A	Pts	PIM	GP	G	A	Pts	PIM
2010–11	Val-d'Or Foreurs	QMJHL	2	0	0	0	0	—	—	—	—	—
2011–12	Val-d'Or Foreurs	QMJHL	63	22	29	51	39	4	2	2	4	6
2012–13	Val-d'Or Foreurs	QMJHL	67	50	39	89	71	9	5	7	12	13
2013–14	Val-d'Or Foreurs	QMJHL	57	57	63	120	75	24	24	14	38	52
2014–15	Grand Rapids Griffins	AHL	62	15	18	33	64	16	2	2	4	16
2015–16	Grand Rapids Griffins	AHL	60	21	24	45	32	9	4	7	11	8
2015–16	Detroit Red Wings	NHL	10	2	1	3	2	—	—	—	—	—
2016–17	Grand Rapids Griffins	AHL	10	8	2	10	6	—	—	—	—	—
2016–17	Detroit Red Wings	NHL	60	17	19	36	53	—	—	—	—	—
2017–18	Detroit Red Wings	NHL	80	24	24	48	52	—	—	—	—	—
2018–19	Detroit Red Wings	NHL	67	25	23	48	30	—	—	—	—	—
2019–20	Detroit Red Wings	NHL	43	16	22	38	34	—	—	—	—	—
2020–21	Detroit Red Wings	NHL	42	11	10	21	17	—	—	—	—	—
2020–21	Washington Capitals	NHL	14	4	4	8	8	5	0	2	2	6
2021–22	Washington Capitals	NHL	37	9	14	23	14	6	0	4	4	13
2022–23	Washington Capitals	NHL	67	11	16	27	31	—	—	—	—	—
2023–24	Washington Capitals	NHL	56	20	14	34	17	—	—	—	—	—
2023–24	Vegas Golden Knights	NHL	18	3	7	10	8	3	0	0	0	2
2024–25	Calgary Flames	NHL	13	4	3	7	11	—	—	—	—	—
2025–26	Pittsburgh Penguins	NHL	81	33	31	64	43	6	0	1	1	20
NHL totals			588	179	188	367	320	20	0	7	7	41

=== International ===
Year	Team	Event	Result	GP	G	A	Pts	PIM
2012	Canada	U18	3rd place, bronze medalist(s)	7	1	0	1	0
2014	Canada	WJC	4th	7	5	6	11	0
2019	Canada	WC	2nd place, silver medalist(s)	9	7	7	14	16
Junior totals				14	6	6	12	0
Senior totals				9	7	7	14	16

== Awards and honours ==
Awards	Year	Ref
CHL
CHL Top Prospects Game	2013	
Player of the Year	2014	
QMJHL
QMJHL Second All-Star Team	2013	
First All-Star Team	2014	
Jean Béliveau Trophy	2014	
Michel Brière Memorial Trophy	2014	
International
WJC All-Star Team	2014	

== Records ==
=== Val-d'Or Foreurs ===
Mantha holds or shares a number of individual junior records:

- Three fastest goals in one period by one player (2:56).
- Most goals by a rookie in one game, away (3).
- Most points by a rookie in one game, away (4).
- Most goals by a player in one period (3).
- Most shorthanded goals by a player in one game (2).
- Most shorthanded goals by a player in one season (5).
- Most consecutive games with at least one point in one season (23).
- Most playoff games by a player in one post-season (24).
- Most playoff goals by a rookie in one game (2).
- Most playoff goals by a player in one game (3).
- Most shorthanded goals by a player in one post-season (2).
- Most career playoff assists by a player, away (15).

Awards and achievements
Preceded by Riley Sheahan	Detroit Red Wings first-round draft pick 2013	Succeeded by Dylan Larkin
Preceded by Jonathan Drouin	CHL Player of the Year; 2014	Succeeded by Connor McDavid
