= David Branch Player of the Year Award =

Annual award to the most outstanding Canadian Hockey League player

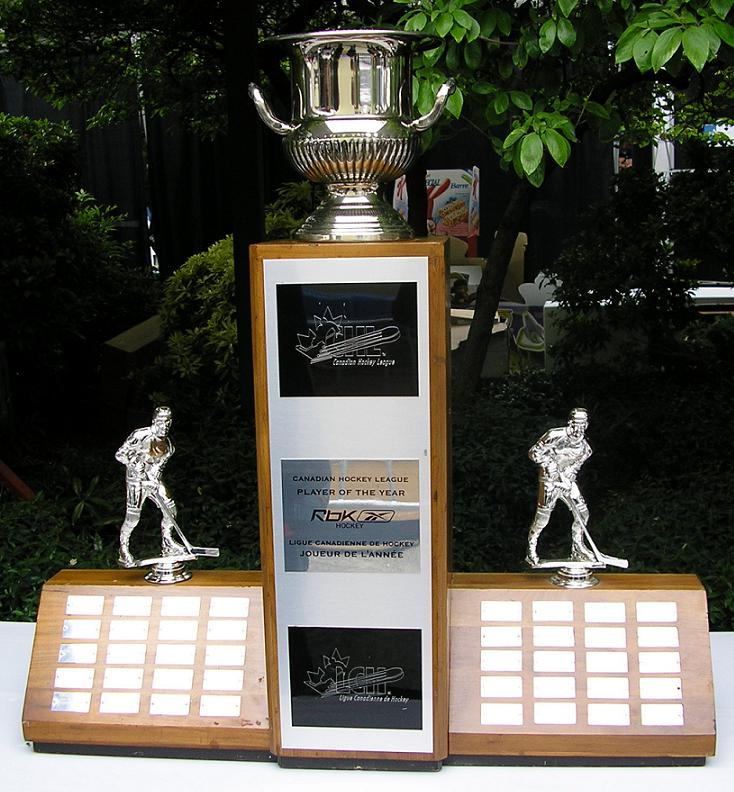
- Sport: Ice hockey
- Awarded for: Annually to the player judged to be the most outstanding in the Canadian Hockey League

History
- First award: 1975
- First winner: Ed Staniowski
- Most wins: Sidney Crosby; Alexis Lafrenière (2)
- Most recent: Maxim Massé

The David Branch Player of the Year award is given out annually to the player judged to be the most outstanding in the Canadian Hockey League (CHL). It is selected from three most valuable players of the respective leagues; the Red Tilson Trophy of Ontario Hockey League (OHL), the Michel Brière Memorial Trophy of the Quebec Maritimes Junior Hockey League (QMJHL), and the Four Broncos Memorial Trophy of the Western Hockey League (WHL). The trophy was known as the CHL Player of the Year award until the 2019–20 season, when it was renamed for David Branch who served as president of the CHL from 1996 to 2019.

As of the 2025–26 selection, the award has been given to players in the OHL 20 times, players in the QMJHL 19 times, and players in the WHL 12 times. Sidney Crosby (2003–04, 2004–05) and Alexis Lafrenière (2018–19, 2019–20) are the only repeat winners.

== Winners ==
List of winners of the CHL Player of the Year award.

Season	Winner	Team	League
1974–75	Ed Staniowski (Note: Staniowski is the only player to not also win his league's respective award (that award instead being won by Bryan Trottier in 1974–75). The award was known as the Canadian Major Junior Player of the Year for this inaugural year.)	Regina Pats	WCHL
1975–76	Peter Lee	Ottawa 67's	OMJHL
1976–77	Dale McCourt	St. Catharines Fincups	OMJHL
1977–78	Bobby Smith	Ottawa 67's	OMJHL
1978–79	Pierre Lacroix	Trois-Rivières Draveurs	QMJHL
1979–80	Doug Wickenheiser	Regina Pats	WHL
1980–81	Dale Hawerchuk	Cornwall Royals	QMJHL
1981–82	Dave Simpson	London Knights	OHL
1982–83	Pat LaFontaine	Verdun Juniors	QMJHL
1983–84	Mario Lemieux	Laval Voisins	QMJHL
1984–85	Dan Hodgson	Prince Albert Raiders	WHL
1985–86	Luc Robitaille	Hull Olympiques	QMJHL
1986–87	Rob Brown	Kamloops Blazers	WHL
1987–88	Joe Sakic	Swift Current Broncos	WHL
1988–89	Bryan Fogarty	Niagara Falls Thunder	OHL
1989–90	Mike Ricci	Peterborough Petes	OHL
1990–91	Eric Lindros	Oshawa Generals	OHL
1991–92	Charles Poulin	Saint-Hyacinthe Laser	QMJHL
1992–93	Pat Peake	Detroit Junior Red Wings	OHL
1993–94	Jason Allison	London Knights	OHL
1994–95	David Ling	Kingston Frontenacs	OHL
1995–96	Christian Dubé	Sherbrooke Castors	QMJHL
1996–97	Alyn McCauley	Ottawa 67's	OHL
1997–98	Sergei Varlamov	Swift Current Broncos	WHL
1998–99	Brian Campbell	Ottawa 67's	OHL
1999–2000	Brad Richards	Rimouski Océanic	QMJHL
2000–01	Simon Gamache	Val-d'Or Foreurs	QMJHL
2001–02	Pierre-Marc Bouchard	Chicoutimi Saguenéens	QMJHL
2002–03	Corey Locke	Ottawa 67's	OHL
2003–04	Sidney Crosby	Rimouski Océanic	QMJHL
2004–05	Sidney Crosby	Rimouski Océanic	QMJHL
2005–06	Alexander Radulov	Quebec Remparts	QMJHL
2006–07	John Tavares	Oshawa Generals	OHL
2007–08	Justin Azevedo	Kitchener Rangers	OHL
2008–09	Cody Hodgson	Brampton Battalion	OHL
2009–10	Jordan Eberle	Regina Pats	WHL
2010–11	Ryan Ellis	Windsor Spitfires	OHL
2011–12	Brendan Shinnimin	Tri-City Americans	WHL
2012–13	Jonathan Drouin	Halifax Mooseheads	QMJHL
2013–14	Anthony Mantha	Val-d'Or Foreurs	QMJHL
2014–15	Connor McDavid	Erie Otters	OHL
2015–16	Mitch Marner	London Knights	OHL
2016–17	Alex DeBrincat	Erie Otters	OHL
2017–18	Alex Barré-Boulet	Blainville-Boisbriand Armada	QMJHL
2018–19	Alexis Lafrenière	Rimouski Océanic	QMJHL
2019–20	Alexis Lafrenière	Rimouski Océanic	QMJHL
2020–21	Not awarded due to COVID-19 pandemic		
2021–22	Logan Stankoven	Kamloops Blazers	WHL
2022–23	Connor Bedard	Regina Pats	WHL
2023–24	Jagger Firkus	Moose Jaw Warriors	WHL
2024–25	Gavin McKenna	Medicine Hat Tigers	WHL
2025–26	Maxim Massé	Chicoutimi Saguenéens	QMJHL

== See also ==
- List of Canadian Hockey League awards
