= Newfoundland Regiment (ice hockey) =

Junior ice hockey team in St. John's, Newfoundland and Labrador

Newfoundland Regiment Régiment de Terre-Neuve
- City: St. John's, Newfoundland and Labrador
- League: Quebec Maritimes Junior Hockey League
- Conference: Eastern
- Division: Maritimes
- Founded: 1969
- Home arena: Mary Brown's Centre
- Colours: Puttee blue, legacy maroon, heritage tan and white
- General manager: Gordie Dwyer
- Head coach: Gordie Dwyer
- Website: Official Website

Franchise history
- 1969–1971: Rosemont National
- 1971–1979: Laval National
- 1979–1985: Laval Voisins
- 1985–1994: Laval Titan
- 1994–1998: Laval Titan Collège Français
- 1998–2025: Acadie–Bathurst Titan
- 2025–present: Newfoundland Regiment

Current uniform

The Newfoundland Regiment are a Canadian junior ice hockey team in the Quebec Maritimes Junior Hockey League who play at the Mary Brown's Centre in St. John's, Newfoundland and Labrador.

== Background ==
The franchise was granted in 1969–70 as the Rosemont National of Rosemont, Quebec as one of the founding teams of the Quebec Major Junior Hockey League (QMJHL). In 1971, they moved from Rosemont to Laval to become the Laval National, and later the Laval Voisins in 1979. In 1985, they became the Laval Titan, and in 1994, the Laval Titan Collège Français. In 1998, they moved to Bathurst, New Brunswick, where they became the Acadie–Bathurst Titan.

In Bathurst, the Titan won two President's Cups and the 2018 Memorial Cup, while based in the smallest market in the Canadian Hockey League, with a population of 13,424 residents. In 2021, the owners unsuccessfully tried to sell the team, and the city of Bathurst announced $175,000 in grants to the team. Attendance averaged more than 3,000 spectators per game in the early 2000s, but declined to 1,627 spectators per game for the 2023–24 season. Team owners had annual deficits in the thousands of dollars, but could not find a local buyer. Owners had hired Ernst & Young to conduct a search for new local ownership to no avail.

== History ==
In December 2024, the QMJHL approved the sale of the team to a group of investors led by Glenn Stanford, who relocated the team to the Mary Brown's Centre in St. John's, Newfoundland and Labrador, for the 2025–26 QMJHL season. This would be the first time the QMJHL returned to St. John's since 2008, when the St. John's Fog Devils became the Montreal Junior Hockey Club. The Regiment are the easternmost team in the Canadian Hockey League following the move.

On January 23, 2025, the Newfoundland Regiment name was announced, paying homage to the Royal Newfoundland Regiment of the Canadian Army. Similar to the military unit's badge, the team's logo consists of a woodland caribou. In June 2025, Gordie Dwyer was named the team's first general manager and head coach, continuing in the same roles he held in Bathurst.

The Regiment played its first game on September 18, 2025, winning by a 7–5 score versus the Moncton Wildcats at the Mary Brown's Centre with sold-out crowd of 6,200.

== Season-by-season results ==
=== Regular season ===
QMJHL season standings.
OTL = Overtime loss, SL = Shootout loss

Season	Games	Won	Lost	OTL	SL	Points	Pct	Goals for	Goals against	Standing
2025–26	64	38	22	3	1	80	0.625	245	210	3rd, Eastern Conf.

=== Playoffs ===
Season	1st round	2nd round	3rd round	Finals
2025–26	W, 4–2, Cape Breton	L, 2–4, Blainville-Boisbriand	–	–
