= Glenn Stanford =

Canadian ice hockey executive (born 1959)

- Born: 1957 (age 68–69); St. John's, Newfoundland and Labrador, Canada
- Occupation: Ice Hockey Executive
- Years active: 1991 - present
- Employer(s): St. John's Maple Leafs vice president (1991-2005); Hamilton Bulldogs president (2006-2011); St. John's IceCaps chief operating officer (2011-2016); Newfoundland Growlers chief operating officer (2018-2024); Newfoundland Regiment president (2025-present)
- Awards: James C. Hendy Memorial Award

Glenn Stanford (born 1957) is a Canadian ice hockey executive. He is currently serving as the president of the Newfoundland Regiment in the QMJHL. He has served as governor and chief operating officer of the St. John's IceCaps of the American Hockey League and the Newfoundland Growlers of the ECHL. Stanford is a two-time winner of the James C. Hendy Memorial Award, awarded to the AHL executive of the year.

In June 2011, Stanford stepped away from his position as president of the Hamilton Bulldogs to accept the role of chief operating officer with the St. John's IceCaps. After the Ice Caps moved to Laval, Quebec to become the Laval Rocket, Stanford formed a group that brought the ECHL to St. John's.

== Awards and honours ==
Award	Year
James C. Hendy Memorial Award AHL executive of the year	2001–02
Thomas Ebright Memorial Award AHL outstanding career contributions	2004–05
James C. Hendy Memorial Award AHL executive of the year	2011–22
