= Alexis Lafrenière =

Canadian ice hockey player (born 2001)

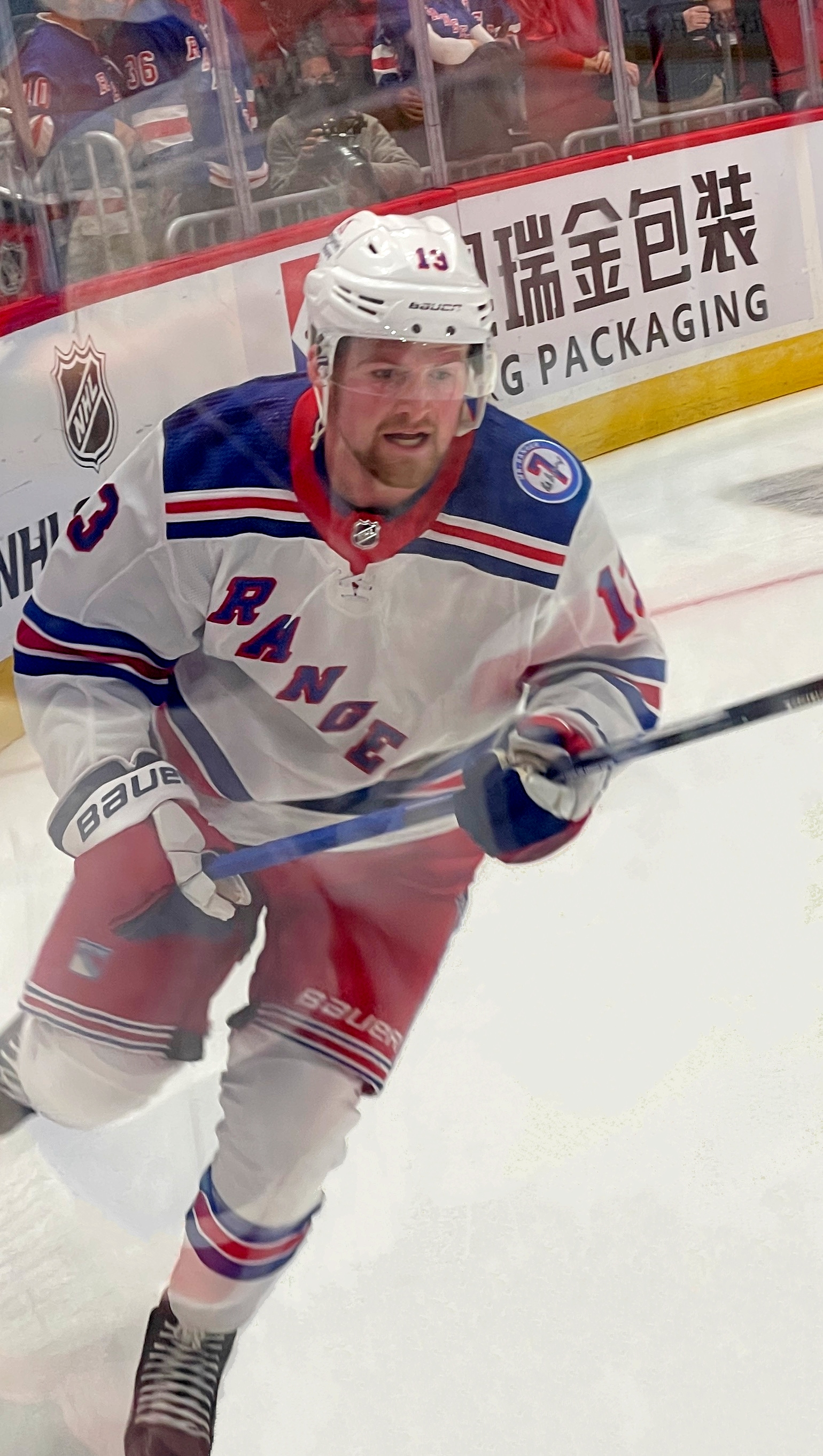
- Lafrenière with the New York Rangers in 2021
- Born: October 11, 2001 (age 24) Saint-Eustache, Quebec, Canada
- Height: 6 ft 2 in (188 cm)
- Weight: 191 lb (87 kg; 13 st 9 lb)
- Position: Winger
- Shoots: Left
- NHL team: New York Rangers
- NHL draft: 1st overall, 2020; New York Rangers
- Playing career: 2021–present

Alexis Lafrenière (French pronunciation: [a.lɛk.si la.fʁə.njɛʁ]; born October 11, 2001) is a Canadian professional ice hockey player who is a winger for the New York Rangers of the National Hockey League (NHL). Selected first overall by the Rimouski Océanic of the Quebec Major Junior Hockey League (QMJHL) in 2017, he was awarded the QMJHL Rookie of the Year award and was named to the First All-Star team in his rookie season. He was selected first overall by the Rangers in the 2020 NHL entry draft and made his NHL debut with the team in 2021.

Lafrenière has represented Canada internationally at the 2018 IIHF World U18 Championships, 2018 Hlinka Gretzky Cup, 2019 World Junior Championships, and the 2020 World Junior Championships. As the captain of the Canadian junior team, Lafrenière led them to a gold medal at the Hlinka Gretzky Cup.

== Playing career ==
=== QMJHL ===
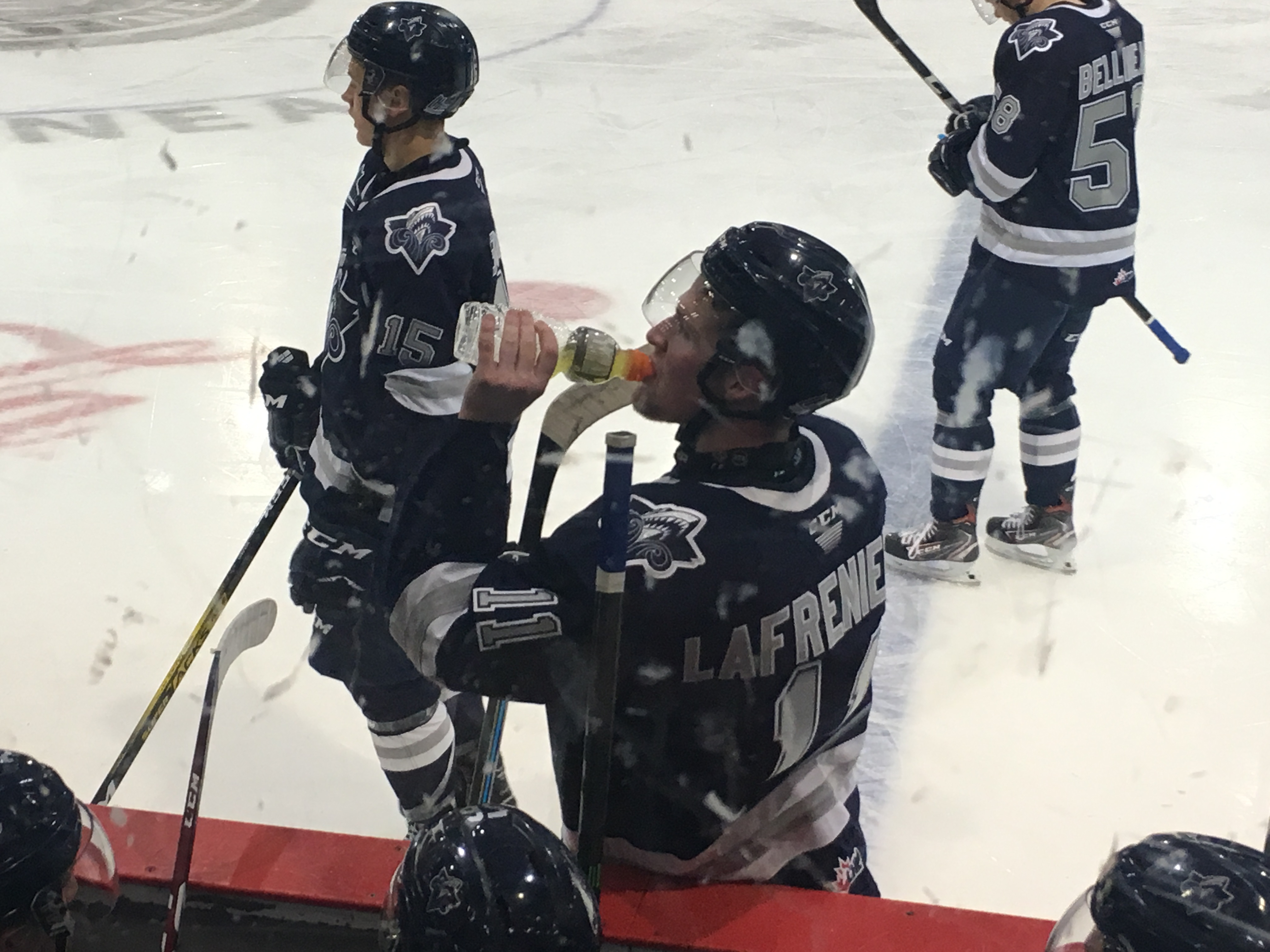
Lafrenière with the Rimouski Océanic in 2020

Lafrenière was selected first overall in the 2017 QMJHL entry draft by Rimouski Océanic. In his rookie season, he scored 42 goals, the most goals scored by a rookie since Sidney Crosby in 2004. He was awarded the RDS Cup as QMJHL rookie of the year and was named to the First All-Star team. In 2019 and 2020, he received the cross-Canadian Hockey League's Player of the Year award, winning out over the Ontario Hockey League (OHL) and Western Hockey League (WHL) most valuable player candidates in both of those years, becoming only the second player ever (joining Sidney Crosby) as a two-time winner of the award.

=== NHL ===
Following the shortened 2019–20 QMJHL season, Lafrenière was considered the consensus first overall pick for the 2020 NHL entry draft having led the league in scoring with 112 points. He was eventually drafted first overall by the New York Rangers on October 6, 2020, becoming their first-ever first overall pick in the entry draft era. (Note: The New York Rangers selected André Veilleux first overall in the 1965 NHL amateur draft. The rules for draft eligibility changed in 1979) On October 12, Lafrenière signed an entry-level contract with the Rangers.

On January 14, 2021, Lafrenière made his NHL debut with the New York Rangers, logging one shot on goal in the 4–0 loss to the New York Islanders. On January 28, 2021, Lafrenière scored his first NHL goal in a 3–2 overtime win against the Buffalo Sabres. He became the first Ranger to score his first career NHL goal in overtime since Mats Zuccarello did on January 5, 2011. Lafrenière also became the youngest player in NHL history to score their first career goal in overtime (19 years, 109 days old). The only other teenage player to do that was Cody Ceci (also 19) in 2013.

On May 7, 2022, Lafrenière scored his first career playoff goal during the Game 4 of the Stanley Cup playoffs against the Pittsburgh Penguins. At 20 years and 208 days, he became the youngest Ranger with a playoff point since Steven Rice (19 years, 322 days) in 1991.

On March 30, 2024, Lafrenière recorded his first NHL career hat trick and five-point game in the Rangers' 8–5 win over the Arizona Coyotes.

On October 25, 2024, Lafrenière signed a seven-year $52.15 million extension with the Rangers.

On March 10, 2026, Lafrenière recorded his second NHL career hat trick in the Rangers' 4–0 win over the Calgary Flames.

On October 6, 2026, Lafrenière recorded his third NHL career hat trick in a 5–2 win over the Islanders.

== International play ==
Medal record

Men's ice hockey

Representing Canada

World Junior Championships
Gold medal – first place	2020 Czech Republic	

Hlinka Gretzky Cup
Gold medal – first place	2018 Edmonton/Red Deer	

Lafrenière was the youngest player selected for Canada under-18 team at the 2018 World U18 Championships at the age of 16. He later captained Canada at the 2018 Hlinka Gretzky Cup tournament, despite being the second youngest on the roster. Lafrenière led the tournament with 11 points in five games, helping Canada win gold.

In December 2018, Lafrenière was named to Canada's 2019 World Junior Championships roster. He was the youngest member on the roster and the ninth-youngest forward ever to represent Canada in the World Juniors. He scored his first, and only, goal of the tournament during Canada's 5–1 win over the Czech Republic. Canada was later eliminated by Team Finland in the quarterfinals.

In December 2019, he was named to Canada's 2020 World Junior Championships roster. After a four-point performance in the team's 6–4 win against the United States in the tournament opener, Lafrenière suffered a lower-body injury the following game after colliding with Russian goaltender Amir Miftakhov on a scoring chance in the second period. He missed two games, and came back strong, helping lead Canada to a gold medal. He was named one of the three best players for Canada, tournament MVP, and was named to the media All-Star team. He registered four goals and six assists for 10 points in five games.

== Personal life ==
Lafrenière was raised in Saint-Eustache, Quebec, the son of Hugo and Nathalie Lafrenière, a first grade teacher. He has one sister, Lori-Jane, who is three years older than him and plays soccer, and attended the Université de Montréal. Alexis was also a talented baseball shortstop in his youth before deciding to focus on ice hockey. Despite being a Montreal Canadiens fan growing up, Lafrenière's favourite player is longtime Chicago Blackhawks star forward Patrick Kane.

== Career statistics ==
=== Regular season and playoffs ===
			Regular season					Playoffs
Season	Team	League	GP	G	A	Pts	PIM	GP	G	A	Pts	PIM
2017–18	Rimouski Océanic	QMJHL	60	42	38	80	54	7	4	3	7	12
2018–19	Rimouski Océanic	QMJHL	61	37	68	105	72	13	9	14	23	14
2019–20	Rimouski Océanic	QMJHL	52	35	77	112	50	—	—	—	—	—
2020–21	New York Rangers	NHL	56	12	9	21	8	—	—	—	—	—
2021–22	New York Rangers	NHL	79	19	12	31	37	20	2	7	9	11
2022–23	New York Rangers	NHL	81	16	23	39	33	7	0	0	0	0
2023–24	New York Rangers	NHL	82	28	29	57	40	16	8	6	14	6
2024–25	New York Rangers	NHL	82	17	28	45	38	—	—	—	—	—
2025–26	New York Rangers	NHL	82	24	33	57	20	—	—	—	—	—
NHL totals			462	116	134	250	176	43	10	13	23	17

=== International ===
Year	Team	Event	Result	GP	G	A	Pts	PIM
2017	Canada Red	U17	2nd place, silver medalist(s)	6	3	3	6	0
2018	Canada	U18	5th	5	4	2	6	2
2018	Canada	HG18	1st place, gold medalist(s)	5	5	6	11	2
2019	Canada	WJC	6th	5	1	0	1	2
2020	Canada	WJC	1st place, gold medalist(s)	5	4	6	10	4
Junior totals				26	17	17	34	10

== Awards and honours ==
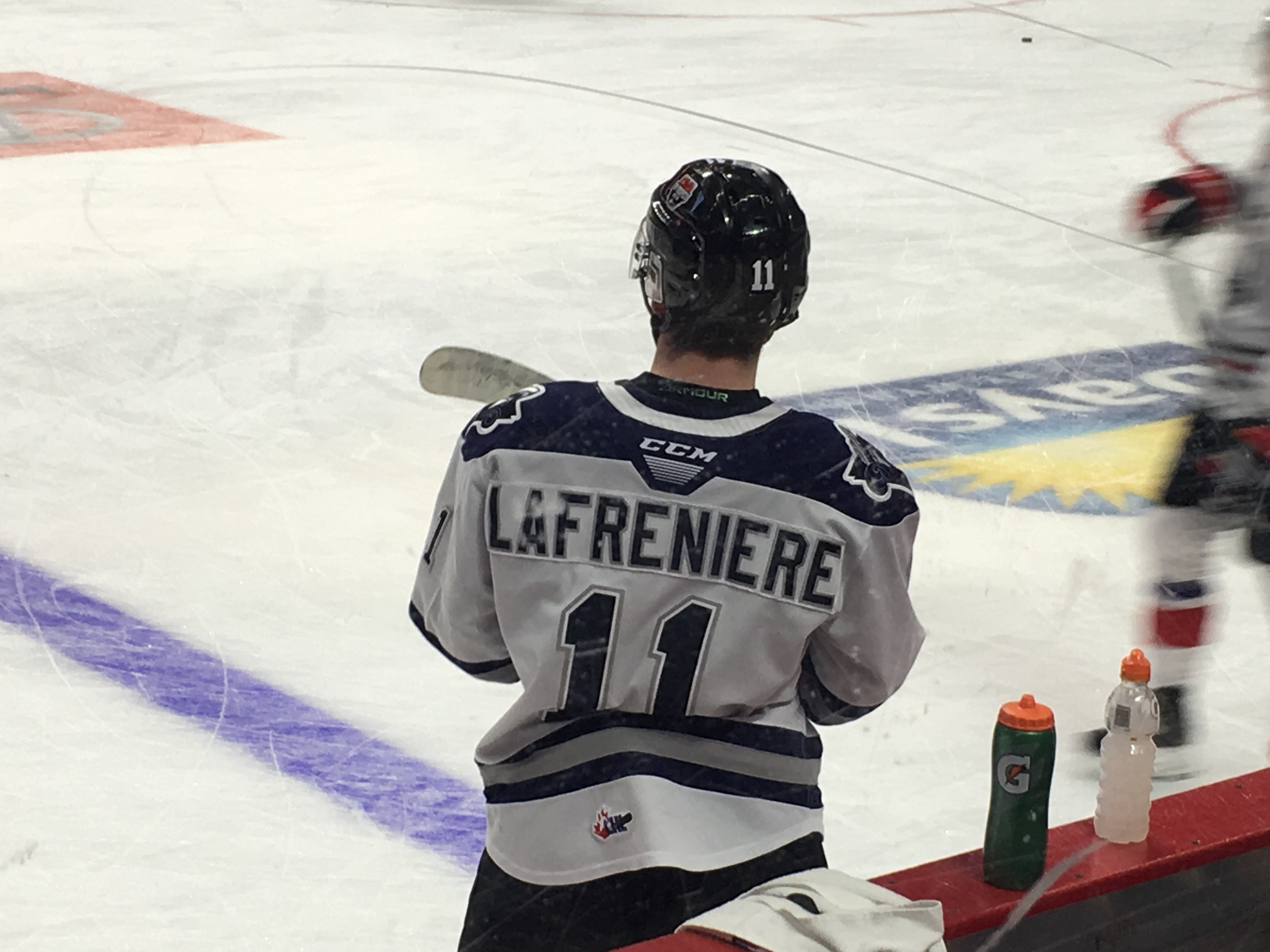
Lafreniere at the 2020 NHL Top Prospects Game in Hamilton, Ontario

Award	Year	Ref
QMJHL
QMJHL All-Rookie Team	2018	
QMJHL First All-Star Team	2018, 2019, 2020	
Rookie of the Year	2018	
Michel Bergeron Trophy	2018	
Paul Dumont Trophy	2019, 2020	
Jean Béliveau Trophy	2020	
Michel Brière Memorial Trophy	2020	
CHL
CHL Player of the Year	2019, 2020 (Note: Lafrenière was the last winner of the CHL Player of the Year Award (so named from 1975 to 2019), and the first winner of the renamed David Branch Player of the Year Award)	
International
World Junior Championships tournament MVP	2020	
World Junior Championships tournament All-Star Team	2020	

== Notes ==
Awards and achievements
Preceded by Jack Hughes	NHL first overall draft pick 2020	Succeeded by Owen Power
Preceded by Kaapo Kakko	New York Rangers first-round draft pick 2020	Succeeded by Braden Schneider
