= Tommy Bleyl =

American ice hockey player (born 2007)

- Born: December 1, 2007 (age 18) Schenectady, New York, U.S.
- Height: 6 ft 0 in (183 cm)
- Weight: 165 lb (75 kg; 11 st 11 lb)
- Position: Defense
- Shoots: Right
- QMJHL team: Moncton Wildcats
- NHL draft: 31st overall, 2026; Nashville Predators

Thomas Bleyl (born December 1, 2007) is an American junior ice hockey defenseman for the Moncton Wildcats of the Quebec Maritimes Junior Hockey League (QMJHL). He was drafted 31st overall by Nashville Predators in the 2026 NHL entry draft.

== Playing career ==
Bleyl played for the Moncton Wildcats of the Quebec Maritimes Junior Hockey League (QMJHL). During the 2025–26 season, in his rookie season, he recorded 13 goals and 68 assists in 63 regular season games. He ranked second among all league rookies with 81 points, setting a new QMJHL record for a rookie defenseman, surpassing the previous record of 77 points set by Gaston Therrien in 1978. Following the season he won the Emile Bouchard Trophy, as the defenceman of the year, and the Sidney Crosby Trophy, as rookie of the year. He became the second player in QMJHL history to earn both awards in the same season, following Dmitry Kulikov during the 2008–09 season.

On June 26, 2026, he was drafted in the first round, 31st overall, by the Nashville Predators in the 2026 NHL entry draft.

He is committed to play college ice hockey at Michigan State during the 2027–28 season.

== Career statistics ==
| | | | Regular season | | | | | Playoffs |
| Season | Team | League | GP | G | A | Pts | PIM | GP | G | A | Pts | PIM |
|---|---|---|---|---|---|---|---|---|---|---|---|---|
| 2024–25 | Dubuque Fighting Saints | USHL | 3 | 0 | 0 | 0 | 0 | — | — | — | — | — |
| 2025–26 | Moncton Wildcats | QMJHL | 63 | 13 | 68 | 81 | 33 | 21 | 6 | 22 | 28 | 6 |
| QMJHL totals | | | 63 | 13 | 68 | 81 | 33 | 21 | 6 | 22 | 28 | 6 |

== Awards and honors ==
| Award | Year |
QMJHL
| All-Rookie Team | 2026 |
| First All-Star Team | 2026 |
| Raymond Lagacé Trophy | 2026 |
| Emile Bouchard Trophy | 2026 |
| Sidney Crosby Trophy | 2026 |
| CHL Rookie of the Year | 2026 |

Awards and achievements
| Preceded by Wyatt Cullen | Nashville Predators first-round draft pick 2026 | Succeeded by Incumbent |
