= Maxim Massé =

Canadian ice hockey player (born 2006)

- Born: April 7, 2006 (age 20) Rimouski, Quebec, Canada
- Height: 6 ft 1 in (185 cm)
- Weight: 195 lb (88 kg; 13 st 13 lb)
- Position: Right wing
- Shoots: Right
- NCAA team: UMass Minutemen
- NHL draft: 66th overall, 2024; Anaheim Ducks

Maxim Massé (born April 7, 2006) is a Canadian college ice hockey right winger for the UMass Minutemen of the National Collegiate Athletic Association (NCAA). He was drafted by the Anaheim Ducks of the National Hockey League (NHL) in the 2024 NHL entry draft. Internationally, Massé played for Canada at the 2024 Hlinka-Gretzky Cup. Starring for the Chicoutimi Saguenéens, Masse earned the CHL Rookie of the Year Award in 2023.

== Playing career ==
With Chicoutimi, Massé finished the 2022–23 season as the league's rookie leader in goals (29) and points (65). In addition, six of his goals were game-winners.

During the 2023–24 season, Massé logged 36 goals and 75 points. Finishing as the leading scorer for Chicoutimi, Massé ranked eighth in the league in goals scored while placing 13th in the league's scoring race.

He will attend and play for the University of Massachusetts.

== Awards and honours ==
Junior
Award	Year	Ref.
Michel Bergeron Trophy; QMJHL offensive rookie of the year	2022–23	
CHL Rookie of the Year	2022–23	
Michael Bossy Trophy; QMJHL best prospect for pro hockey	2023–24	
Jean Béliveau Trophy; QMJHL top scorer	2025–26	
Gilles-Courteau Trophy champion	2026	
