= Sherwood Bassin =

Canadian ice hockey executive

- Born: August 14, 1939 (age 86); Semans, Saskatchewan, Canada
- Occupation: Ice hockey executive
- Years active: 1975–present
- Known for: Oshawa Generals; Team Canada juniors Sault Ste. Marie Greyhounds; Erie Otters

Sherwood Bassin (born August 14, 1939) is a Canadian ice hockey executive known primarily for 36 years of involvement in the Ontario Hockey League as a general manager, team owner and coach. Bassin successfully turned franchises around, and his teams won five J. Ross Robertson Cups, and appeared in six Memorial Cup tournaments, winning once. Bassin helped the Canadian National junior team win its first gold medal in 1982, and another in 1985. He was twice named OHL Executive of the Year and CHL Executive of the Year, and briefly worked for the Quebec Nordiques.

== Early life and education ==
Bassin was born on August 14, 1939, in Semans, Saskatchewan. Growing up in Semans, he then played junior hockey in North Dakota, then coached a team to a state championship. Bassin coached house league teams in Toronto, including a bantam team that won city a championship, and later in Wexford, winning an Ontario championship in 1970. During the 1975–76 season, he coached the Pickering Panthers in the Metro Junior B Hockey League.

Bassin completed three degrees; a Ph.D. in hospital pharmacy, a Masters in hospital administration, and a Juris Doctor. He worked with the legal division of Canada's Food & Drug Directorate in Toronto, and as a pharmacist in a hospital. He taught 25 years as a professor at Durham College, where he helped design a paralegal program for Ontario.

== Oshawa Generals ==
Bassin was announced as the Oshawa Generals head coach in March 1976, replacing Gus Bodnar who remained as the general manager. Bassin had a young team that struggled through many injuries and finished last place. After the season, he moved to the general manager position, and Bill White was hired to coach. The Generals had the first overall pick in the 1977 draft, and Bassin chose not to make Wayne Gretzky his first pick as general manager since Gretzky only planned on playing one season of junior, then going to the Indianapolis Racers in the World Hockey Association. Bassin chose Tom McCarthy instead, building for the future.

During the 1978–79 OMJHL season, served briefly as interim commissioner of Ontario Major Junior Hockey League after the departure of Bill Beagan in January, until David Branch was hired in September.

Bassin had built a J. Ross Robertson Cup winning team by the 1982–83 OHL season, and finished as runners-up in the 1983 Memorial Cup, under coach Paul Theriault. Four years later, Generals won the J. Ross Robertson Cup in the 1986–87 OHL season, and finished runners-up in the 1987 Memorial Cup.

Bassin remained as general manager until 1989, when he resigned to take the same position in Sault Sainte Marie. The team nucleus Bassin developed went on to win the 1990 Memorial Cup. Notable players drafted by Bassin during his time in Oshawa include: Dave Andreychuk, Joe Cirella, Mike Craig, Jeff Daniels, Dale DeGray, Peter Horachek, Charlie Huddy, Derek King, Steve Konroyd, Rick Lanz, John MacLean, Gord Murphy, Lee Norwood, Jim Paek, Peter Sidorkiewicz, Jarrod Skalde, Greg Stefan, and Tony Tanti.

During his tenure with the Generals, he acted as a colour commentator on CBC Sports and Global TV in the late 1980s, for World junior championship coverage.

== Team Canada juniors ==
While general manager with the Oshawa Generals, Bassin pushed to have teams in the Canadian Hockey League send their best players to build a true Team Canada. He was assistant coach and assistant general manager of the national junior team from 1982 to 1985. When Canada won its first junior gold medal at the 1982 World Junior Ice Hockey Championships in Minnesota, players stood along the blue line and sang O Canada, when no national anthem was available. Bassin helped Canada win bronze at the 1983 World Junior Ice Hockey Championships, fourth place at the 1984 World Junior Ice Hockey Championships, and a second gold medal at the 1985 World Junior Ice Hockey Championships.

== Sault Ste. Marie Greyhounds ==
Bassin served as general manager of the Sault Ste. Marie Greyhounds from 1989 to 1993. He was responsible for the trade of Eric Lindros to the Oshawa Generals for Mike Lenarduzzi, Mike DeCoff, Jason Denomme, and Fred Goltz. The Greyhounds missed the playoffs in 1990, but Bassin quickly built the Greyhounds through the draft and trades. In 1990, Bassin received the Bill Long Award for distinguished service to the OHL. Only two years after he took over, the Greyhounds were J. Ross Robertson cup champions in the 1991–92 OHL season under coach Ted Nolan. They defeated Bassin's old team, the Oshawa Generals in the finals, and played in the 1991 Memorial Cup. Bassin was named both the OHL Executive of the Year, and the CHL Executive of the Year in 1991. The Greyhounds repeated as champions in the 1991–92 OHL season, and appeared in the 1992 Memorial Cup. Sault Ste. Marie was chosen as host of the 1993 Memorial Cup, ensuring three consecutive appearances in the national championship. Bassin's team reached the finals in the 1992–93 OHL season, losing to the Peterborough Petes, but won the Memorial Cup on home ice at Sault Memorial Gardens. Other notable players acquired by Bassin during his time in Sault Ste. Marie include: Drew Bannister, Dan Cloutier, Aaron Gavey, Kevin Hodson, Ralph Intranuovo, Chad Penney, Chris Simon, Steve Sullivan, and Jeff Toms.

== Quebec Nordiques ==
After the Memorial Cup, Bassin took on the dual role of assistant general manager of the Quebec Nordiques in the National Hockey League, and the general manager of the Cornwall Aces in the American Hockey League. Bassin worked with general manager Maurice Filion from 1993 to 1995 to help develop the farm team, and negotiated several NHL contracts.

== Erie Otters ==
Bassin was part of the ownership group which relocated the Niagara Falls Thunder to Erie, Pennsylvania, and then later became the primary owner of the Erie Otters. He was general manager of the Otters from 1996 to 2015. Erie won its first playoff series in its fourth season, and two years later were J. Ross Robertson Cup champions in the 2001–02 OHL season, and played in the 2002 Memorial Cup. The Otters became the third franchise that Bassin built into an OHL champion, and to play in the Memorial Cup. Bassin was awarded the OHL Executive of the Year award, and the CHL Executive of the Year award, both for a second time in his career.

The Otters fortunes then turned sour, winning only one playoff series in the next eleven seasons, and missing the playoffs six times. Bassin blamed himself for Erie's poor results, as he was absent too much due to his daughter's illness, and dividing his time as part owner of Erie's Ontario Provincial Junior A Hockey League affiliate team, the Huntsville–Muskoka Otters from 2003 to 2007. Bassin and the Otters were in financial trouble during the 2011–12 OHL season due to poor attendance, and poor on-ice results. A deal was made where Bassin was loaned $4.2 million USD by Ontario Major Junior Hockey Corporation, a subsidiary of Oilers Entertainment Group, to buy the Otters if successfully relocated to Hamilton, Ontario. Oilers' owner Daryl Katz wanted to buy the Otters to take control of the lease at Copps Coliseum, and use it as leverage for a new Edmonton Oilers arena. When the deal did not materialize, Bassin was sued by the Oilers. The lawsuit from Edmonton was dismissed by the United States District Court for the Western District of Pennsylvania. Bassin voluntarily filed for Chapter 11 bankruptcy protection to sell the team.

By the 2014–15 OHL season, Bassin had rebuilt the Otters to a team that appeared in the league finals. After the playoffs concluded, the team was sold to Canadian businessman James Waters (son of Allan Waters), and JAW Hockey Enterprises LP for $7,225,000 USD. The team nucleus that Bassin had built and sold, later won the championship in the 2016–17 OHL season, and played in the 2017 Memorial Cup.

During nineteen seasons with the Erie Otters, Bassin helped many players into the National Hockey League. Some notable players drafted and developed by Bassin include: Nikita Alexeev, Mike Blunden, Brad Boyes, Connor Brown, André Burakovsky, Chris Campoli, Carlo Colaiacovo, Tim Connolly, Alex DeBrincat, Luke Gazdic, Mike Liambas, Connor McDavid, Greg McKegg, Jordan Nolan, Ryan O'Reilly, Nick Palmieri, Adam Pelech, Anthony Peluso, and Dylan Strome.

== French River Rapids ==
Bassin became director of hockey operations for the French River Rapids in the Northern Ontario Junior Hockey League starting with the 2017–18 season. Bassin and coach Ken Strong took over a team that had won just five games in two seasons.

== Personal life ==
Bassin resides in Oshawa, Ontario, and is Jewish. He has had hip and shoulder replacement due to osteoarthritis, and has organized golf tournaments to raise funds in support of the Canadian Orthopaedic Foundation, for which he is on the board of directors. Bassin is a past president and founding member of the Whitby Rotary Club. He has also served on the board of directors for the Durham Symphony Orchestra, and Ontario Philharmonic. Bassin was named Ontario Sport Administrator of the year in 1985, was inducted into the Oshawa Sports Hall of Fame in 1994, and named City of Oshawa citizen of the year. He considers his role models and mentors to be Gordon MacMurchy, Vince Lombardi, John Wooden, Pierre Pagé, and Dave King.

== Coaching record ==
Regular season and postseason coaching statistics.

Season	Team	League	Regular season						Playoffs
Season	Team	League	G	W	L	T	Pts	Finish	Result
1975–76	Pickering Panthers	MJBHL	34	18	12	4	40	4th Metro B	Lost, first round
1976–77	Oshawa Generals	OMJHL	66	5	57	4	14	6th in Leyden	Out of playoffs
