= Gouin =

Gouin or Goüin may refer to:

== Places ==
- Barrage Gouin Water Aerodrome, airport in Quebec
- Gouin-Gouin, town in Burkina Faso
- Gouin (electoral district), provincial electoral district
- Gouin Boulevard, longest street on the island of Montreal
- Gouin Reservoir, lake in Quebec
- Pointe du Grand Gouin, promontory

== Other uses ==
- Gouin (surname)
- 69 Gouin, bus route in Montreal
- Hôtel Goüin, hôtel particulier in Tours
- Gouin Street Arena, former sports complex in Sault Ste. Marie, Ontario
