= CHL Executive of the Year =

Annual award to the most outstanding Canadian Hockey League executive (1989–2002)

- Sport: Ice hockey
- Awarded for: Outstanding executive in the Canadian Hockey League

History
- First award: 1989
- Final award: 2002
- Most wins: Sherwood Bassin (2)
- Most recent: Sherwood Bassin

The CHL Executive of the Year award is given out annually to the top executive in the Canadian Hockey League. The award has not been conferred since 2002. Recipients are chosen from the winners of the respective constituent league awards: the OHL Executive of the Year, the Lloyd Saunders Memorial Trophy (WHL), and the John Horman Trophy (QMJHL).

== Winners ==
List of winners of the CHL Executive of the Year award.

Season	Winner	Team	League
1988–89	John Horman	League executive	QMJHL
1989–90	Russ Farwell	Seattle Thunderbirds	WHL
1990–91	Sherwood Bassin	Sault Ste. Marie Greyhounds	OHL
1991–92	Bert Templeton	North Bay Centennials	OHL
1992–93	Jim Rutherford	Detroit Junior Red Wings	OHL
1993–94	Bob Brown	Kamloops Blazers	WHL
1994–95	Kelly McCrimmon	Brandon Wheat Kings	WHL
1995–96	Tim Speltz	Spokane Chiefs	WHL
1996–97	Harold MacKay	Halifax Mooseheads	QMJHL
1997–98	Paul McIntosh	London Knights	OHL
1998–99	Jeff Hunt	Ottawa 67's	OHL
1999–2000	Maurice Tanguay	Rimouski Océanic	QMJHL
2000–01	Mario Boucher	Shawinigan Cataractes	QMJHL
2001–02	Sherwood Bassin	Erie Otters	OHL

== See also ==
- List of Canadian Hockey League awards
