= Lenarduzzi =

Lenarduzzi is an Italian surname. Notable people with the surname include:

- Bob Lenarduzzi (born 1955), Canadian soccer player
- Sam Lenarduzzi (born 1949), Canadian soccer player
- Mike Lenarduzzi, Canadian ice hockey player
