= Sault Ste. Marie Greyhounds =

Ontario Hockey League team in Sault Ste. Marie

- City: Sault Ste. Marie, Ontario
- League: Ontario Hockey League
- Conference: Western
- Division: West
- Founded: 1962 (NOHA Jr. A); 1972 (OHA)
- Home arena: GFL Memorial Gardens
- Colours: Red, white
- General manager: Kyle Raftis
- Head coach: Drew Bannister
- Website: www.soogreyhounds.com

Championships
- Playoff championships: 1993 Memorial Cup Champions

Current uniform

The Sault Ste. Marie Greyhounds (often shortened to Soo Greyhounds) are a major junior ice hockey team in the Ontario Hockey League. The Greyhounds play home games at the GFL Memorial Gardens. The present team was founded in 1962 as a team in the Northern Ontario Hockey Association. The Greyhounds name has been used by several ice hockey teams based in Sault Ste. Marie, Ontario, Canada, since 1919.

== Early years ==
The first Greyhounds team formed in 1919, playing in the now defunct Upper-Peninsula League. The team's coach was George McNamara. He suggested the team be called the Greyhounds since, "a greyhound is much faster than a wolf." That reference was to the already established rival club, the Sudbury Wolves.

A couple of seasons later, the Greyhounds switched to the Northern Ontario Hockey Association Senior "A" division. The team won the Senior A championship in 1921, 1923, 1924 and 1925. The 1924 Greyhounds also won the Allan Cup, becoming the only team from Sault Ste. Marie to do so. In October 1925, the club received an offer from New York to play as the Knickerbockers in the Eastern Amateur Hockey League. The Greyhounds joined the Central Amateur Hockey Association, a division of the United States Amateur Hockey Association for the 1925–26 season. After the season, several players joined the professional ranks and the team folded.

In 1929, a junior Greyhounds team was organized, competing in the Northern Ontario Junior Hockey League. The juniors won the league championship four consecutive years from 1928 to 1931, and added a fifth title in 1942. Junior hockey in Sault Ste. Marie came to an abrupt end in 1945, when the Gouin Street Arena was destroyed by fire.

The senior Greyhounds team was revived in 1948. The new team played out of a temporary home at Pullar Stadium, in Sault Sainte Marie, Michigan, U.S.A., until the Memorial Gardens opened in 1949. The senior Greyhounds won the NOHA championship four times, in 1950, 1951, 1952 and 1955. This team folded, along with the league, after the 1958–59 season.

== Modern era ==
The current Greyhounds Junior A franchise was founded in 1962 as a member of the Northern Ontario Junior Hockey League (NOJHL). The team's founders were Angelo Bumbacco, Lloyd Prokop, Phil Suraci, Pat Esposito and Bill Kelly. During the Greyhounds ten seasons in the NOJHL, they never had a losing season, and won the league championship three times. In 1972, the Greyhounds entered the Ontario Hockey Association as a Major Junior A expansion team. The original founders served as directors, joined by Frank Caputo and Frank Sarlo. Angelo Bumbacco died on October 27, 2020, aged 88.

=== Wayne Gretzky 1977–78 ===
In 1977, the Sault Ste. Marie Greyhounds picked a 16-year-old Wayne Gretzky, standing at 5 ft 8 in (173 cm) and weighing 155 pounds (70 kg), with the third pick in the Ontario Midget Draft. He was still small in stature, but would have a big impact on the game.

Gretzky requested to wear # 9 for his idol Gordie Howe, but that number was already taken by teammate Brian Gualazzi. Gretzky then chose # 14 instead. After a few games, coach Muzz MacPherson suggested wearing two nines would be better than one. From that season on, Gretzky always wore the legendary # 99.

In 63 games that year, he set the Greyhounds all-time record, scoring 70 goals and had 112 assists for a total of 182 points. Gretzky would have won the scoring title, except for a 192-point season by 20-year-old player Bobby Smith. Gretzky was awarded the Emms Family Award as the rookie of the year, and the William Hanley Trophy as most gentlemanly player.

=== Memorial Cup, 1985 ===
After winning the OHL championship, the Greyhounds travelled to Shawinigan, Quebec to compete in the Memorial Cup tournament, for the national junior hockey title. The Greyhounds played against the host team Shawinigan Cataractes, the QMJHL champion Verdun Junior Canadiens, and the WHL champion Prince Albert Raiders.

The Greyhounds were led by future NHLers, Jeff Beukeboom, Chris Felix, Derek King, Wayne Presley, Bob Probert and Rob Zettler. Leading scorers in the regular season were Wayne Groulx, Graeme Bonar and Sault Ste. Marie native Mike Oliverio.

The Greyhounds won the first game on May 11 in Shawinigan versus the home team, by a score 4–3, in front of 3,276 fans. Televising games from the Aréna Jacques Plante in Shawinigan proved difficult due to roof support pillars around the ice surface. After two games in Shawinigan, the remainder of the tournament was played in the Centre Marcel Dionne in Drummondville, Quebec.

The Greyhounds won their first game in Drummondville 6–3 over Verdun, with two goals from Derek King. Their first loss of the tournament came in game three, losing 8–6 to the Prince Albert Raiders. With the loss, the Cataractes, Raiders and Greyhounds would all finish the round-robin with two wins and a loss. Shawinigan earned a spot in the finals on best goals for and against difference, with Sault Ste. Marie and Prince Albert to have a rematch in the semi-final game. On May 16, the Greyhounds lost again to the Raiders.

1985 Memorial Cup scores
Game	Winner	Score	Loser	Score	Venue
Round-robin	S.S.Marie	4	Shawinigan	2	Aréna Jacques Plante
Round-robin	Shawinigan	6	Prince Albert	2	Aréna Jacques Plante
Round-robin	S.S.Marie	6	Verdun	3	Centre Marcel Dionne
Round-robin	Prince Albert	5	Verdun	3	Centre Marcel Dionne
Round-robin	Prince Albert	8	S.S.Marie	6	Centre Marcel Dionne
Round-robin	Shawinigan	5	Verdun	1	Centre Marcel Dionne
Semi-final	Prince Albert	8	S.S.Marie	3	Centre Marcel Dionne
Championship	Prince Albert	6	Shawinigan	1	Centre Marcel Dionne

=== Memorial Cup, 1991 ===
The Greyhounds season of 1990–91 marked an incredible turnaround from seventh place the season before, to finishing first place and winning the Emms division. General manager Sherwood Bassin put together pieces for coach Ted Nolan to win. Bassin was awarded Bill Long Award for distinguished service to the OHL, was named both the OHL Executive of the Year, and the CHL Executive of the Year in 1991.

The Greyhounds swept both playoff series and earned a second round bye to reach the OHL finals against the defending champions, the Oshawa Generals. The J. Ross Robertson Cup finals had many subplots due to the big trade between the clubs in the previous season. Added to the mix was Joe Busillo, an overager picked up from Oshawa, who won the Memorial Cup with the Generals the previous year. Fans from the Soo were still very bitter towards Oshawa captain Eric Lindros, who had originally been drafted by the Greyhounds in 1989 but chose not to play for them (eventually being traded to the Generals). The Soo crowd loudly jeered Lindros every time he was on the ice during the championship series. The Greyhounds upset the heavily favoured defending champions in a six-game series, winning the last game on home ice.

The Greyhounds were led in scoring by Colin Miller, Tony Iob, Trevor Koopmans, and future NHLers Adam Foote and tough guys Bob Boughner, and Denny Lambert. Other members to move onto the NHL included Drew Bannister, Ralph Intranuovo, Brad Tiley and goaltenders Kevin Hodson and Mike Lenarduzzi.

The 1991 Memorial Cup was hosted by the QMJHL in Quebec City at the Colisée de Québec. Their opponents would be the WHL champion Spokane Chiefs, and the QMJHL finalists Drummondville Voltigeurs and the champion Chicoutimi Saguenéens. The Greyhounds did not win a game in the tournament, but gained valuable experience for next season.

1991 Memorial Cup scores
All games played at the Colisée de Québec.
Game	Winner	Score	Loser	Score
Round-robin	Drummondville	4	S.S.Marie	2
Round-robin	Spokane	7	Drummondville	3
Round-robin	Chicoutimi	2	S.S.Marie	1
Round-robin	Spokane	7	Chicoutimi	1
Round-robin	Spokane	8	S.S.Marie	4
Round-robin	Drummondville	5	Chicoutimi	3
Semi-final	Drummondville	2	Chicoutimi	1
Championship	Spokane	5	Drummondville	1

=== Memorial Cup, 1992 ===
The 1991–92 Greyhounds repeated as winners of the Emms division. Sault Ste. Marie earned a first round bye in the playoffs, then defeated the Kitchener Rangers and Niagara Falls Thunder to return to the league finals. The Greyhounds won their third J. Ross Robertson Cup by defeating their northern counterparts, the North Bay Centennials in a seven-game series.

The Greyhounds were led by captain Rick Kowalsky, and in scoring by Jarrett Reid's 53 goals and also had two players with 100 point seasons, Colin Miller and Ralph Intranuovo. The Soo also gained a midseason boost and more toughness, acquiring future NHLer Chris Simon in a trade with the Ottawa 67's.

The 1992 Memorial Cup was hosted by the WHL in Seattle, Washington at the Seattle Center Coliseum. Their opponents would be the WHL champion Kamloops Blazers, the QMJHL champion Verdun Collège Français, and the host Seattle Thunderbirds.

The Greyhounds reversed their fortunes of the previous Memorial Cup, winning all three games of the round-robin, advancing directly to the tournament finals. Their opponent in the finals would be the Kamloops Blazers. The Greyhounds came back from an early 3–0 deficit 15 minutes into the game to tie the score at 3-3. Kamloops scored early in the third period for a 4–3 lead. Chris Simon then tied the game for Sault Ste. Marie with four minutes remaining to play. The game looked to be headed for overtime, until Kamloops' Zac Boyer scored on a breakaway with 14.6 seconds remaining to seal the victory for the Blazers.

1992 Memorial Cup scores
All games played at the Seattle Center Coliseum.
Game	Winner	Score	Loser	Score
Round-robin	Seattle	5	Verdun	3
Round-robin	S.S.Marie	6	Kamloops	3
Round-robin	Kamloops	4	Verdun	0
Round-robin	S.S.Marie	4	Verdun	2
Round-robin	S.S.Marie	3	Seattle	3
Round-robin	Kamloops	3	Seattle	1
Semi-final	Kamloops	8	Seattle	3
Championship	Kamloops	5	S.S.Marie	4

=== Memorial Cup, 1993 ===
In the 1992–93, the Greyhounds won their third consecutive Emms division title. They narrowly beat out the Detroit Junior Red Wings by having more wins in the regular season despite both teams earning 81 points. The OHL revived the idea of a Super Series from six years previous to determine which team would host the Memorial Cup of 1993. The Greyhounds assured themselves of a third consecutive trip to the Memorial Cup, by sweeping the series versus the Leyden division champion Peterborough Petes. Jarret Reid led Sault Ste. Marie in scoring through the playoffs, with 19 goals and 16 assists in 18 games.

After the Super Series ended, the regular playoffs started. Sault Ste. Marie earned the first round bye, then defeated the Owen Sound Platers and the Junior Red Wings to reach the finals against the Petes. This time, the Petes prevailed 4 games to 1, spoiling the Greyhounds chances of a third consecutive J. Ross Robertson Cup. Joining the Greyhounds and Petes in the Memorial Cup would be the WHL champion Swift Current Broncos and the QMJHL champion Laval Titan.

The Greyhounds and the Petes both finished the Memorial Cup round-robin with two wins and a loss. Sault Ste. Marie earned a berth in the finals by having beaten the Petes in the round robin. The two teams would meet again in the tournament finals, playing in front a hometown crowd of 4,757 spectators at the Memorial Gardens on May 23. Sault Ste. Marie led 3–0 after the first period, and held on to win their first Memorial Championship, beating the Petes 4–2. The victory party continued on Queen St. late into the evening.

1993 Memorial Cup scores
All games played at the Sault Memorial Gardens.
Game	Winner	Score	Loser	Score
Round-robin	S.S.Marie	3	Laval	2
Round-robin	Swift Current	5	S.S.Marie	3
Round-robin	Peterborough	6	Laval	4
Round-robin	Peterborough	7	Swift Current	3
Round-robin	Laval	4	Swift Current	2
Round-robin	S.S.Marie	7	Peterborough	3
Tiebreaker	Laval	4	Swift Current	3
Semi-final	Peterborough	3	Laval	1
Championship	S.S.Marie	4	Peterborough	2

=== Recent years ===
The Greyhounds followed up their Memorial Cup winning season with a strong 1993–94 campaign finishing second place in the division. The Soo reached the semi-finals, but lost to the Junior Red Wings in six games. After the season, coach Ted Nolan departed for the Hartford Whalers.

The following 1994–95 season, the Greyhounds finished last place in the league during a rebuilding season. In attempt to generate more sales, the Greyhounds redesigned their logo. It proved to be unpopular with the fans, and the team discontinued its use after the 1998–99 season, and went back to the classic logo.

Centre Joe Thornton was the 1995–96 OHL rookie of the year and was the first player in the history of the franchise to be drafted first overall in the NHL entry draft. He was selected by the Boston Bruins.

In the 2001–02 season, former Greyhound defenceman Craig Hartsburg took over as head coach after coaching stints in the NHL. Hartsburg was named the OHL coach of the year that season, then left the team to join the coaching staff of the Philadelphia Flyers.

Replacing Hartsburg was former Greyhound netminder, and part-owner of the team, John Vanbiesbrouck. Vanbiesbrouck was forced to resign as coach during the season as a result of racist comments he had made about team captain, Trevor Daley. Hartsburg returned as coach midway through the 2004–05 season.

After playing at the Sault Memorial Gardens from 1962 to 2006, the Greyhounds moved into their new home, the Steelback Centre, for the 2006–07 season. In June 2008, the arena was renamed The Essar Centre, following the purchase of naming rights by Essar Steel Algoma.

In the 2007–08 OHL season, the Greyhounds had their best regular season since 1985, going 44–18–2–4, with a long undefeated streak to begin the year. The Greyhounds also had their longest post season run since 1994, making it to the conference finals before losing to the Kitchener Rangers in five games.

In the 2008–09 season, assistant coach Denny Lambert assumed head coaching duties after Craig Hartsburg left to become head coach of the NHL's Ottawa Senators. Assistant coach Toots Kovacs also left the team and was replaced by Mike Stapleton and Nick Warriner. The Greyhounds missed the playoffs for the first time since 2004.

After several trades in the organization had shown a shift to rebuilding the team, Dave Torrie (General Manager), took over head coaching duties with the firing of Denny Lambert in January 2011. Later that same year Dave Torrie was also relieved of his duties and replaced with Kyle Dubas as general manager. The fans also welcomed back Mike Stapleton as new Head Coach for next season, but was fired and replaced on December 3, 2012, by Sheldon Keefe.

After the 2014–15 OHL season, the Greyhounds had taken the Hamilton Spectator Trophy while setting a franchise record in regular season points. During the 2015 playoffs, the Greyhounds had their run ended by Connor McDavid and the Erie Otters in the Western Conference Finals. After one of the teams best seasons, head coach Sheldon Keefe had signed with the Toronto Marlies of the AHL.

On July 10, 2015, Drew Bannister was named head coach of the Greyhounds. He would leave after the 2017–18 season to become the head coach of the San Antonio Rampage in the AHL. Bannister had led the Hounds to an overall 136–50–13–5 record, two West Division titles, and was named OHL and CHL coach of the year in 2018.

== Championships ==
While in the Northern Ontario Junior Hockey League, the Greyhounds won the McNamara Trophy as playoff champions in 1967, 1970, and 1972. The Greyhounds were also regular season champions six times and playoff finalists 4 times.

The Greyhounds also joined the Oshawa Generals and Peterborough Petes as the only OHL teams to make three consecutive appearances in the Memorial Cup. Since joining the OHL, Sault Ste. Marie has won a total of 8 division titles, five Hamilton Spectator Trophy titles, three J. Ross Robertson Cup titles, and one Memorial Cup title.

Division Trophies

- 1980–81 - Leyden Division
- 1982–83 - Emms Division
- 1984–85 - Emms Division
- 1990–91 - Emms Division
- 1991–92 - Emms Division
- 1992–93 - Emms Division
- 1996–97 - West Division
- 2004–05 - West Division
- 2007–08 - West Division
- 2013–14 - West Division
- 2014-15 - West Division
- 2016-17 - West Division
- 2017-18 - West Division

Hamilton Spectator Trophy

- 1980–81 - 47 Wins, 2 Ties, 96 points
- 1982–83 - 48 Wins, 1 Tie, 97 points
- 1984–85 - 54 Wins, 1 Tie, 109 points
- 2014-15 - 54 W, 12 L, 0 OTL, 2 SL, 110 points
- 2017-18 - 55 W, 7 L, 3 OTL, 3 SL, 116 points

Wayne Gretzky Trophy

- 2000 Lost to the Plymouth Whalers
- 2008 Lost to the Kitchener Rangers
- 2015 Lost to the Erie Otters
- 2018 Champions vs. the Kitchener Rangers

J. Ross Robertson Cup

- 1981 Lost to the Kitchener Rangers
- 1983 Lost to the Oshawa Generals
- 1985 Champions vs. the Peterborough Petes
- 1991 Champions vs. the Oshawa Generals
- 1992 Champions vs. the North Bay Centennials
- 1993 Lost to the Peterborough Petes
- 2018 Lost to the Hamilton Bulldogs

Memorial Cup

- 1985 3rd place in Drummondville, Québec
- 1991 4th place in Québec City, Québec
- 1992 Finalists vs. the Kamloops Blazers
- 1993 Champions vs. the Peterborough Petes

== Coaches ==
Terry Crisp was twice voted the OHL Coach of the Year, winning the Matt Leyden Trophy in 1982-83 and 1984–85. Craig Hartsburg won the award in 2001–02. Most recently Drew Bannister won the award in 2017–18.

List of coaches with multiple seasons in parentheses.

- 1972–1974: Abbie Carricato (2)
- 1974–1975: Angelo Bumbacco
- 1975–1977: Muzz MacPherson (3)
- 1977–1978: Muzz MacPherson & Paul Theriault
- 1978–1979: Paul Theriault (4)
- 1979–1985: Terry Crisp (6)
- 1985–1986: Don MacAdam
- 1986–1988: Don Boyd (3)
- 1988–1989: Don Boyd & Ted Nolan
- 1989–1994: Ted Nolan (6)
- 1994–1995: Dan Flynn
- 1995–1997: Joe Paterson (2)
- 1997–1999: Dave Cameron (2)
- 1999–2001: Paul Theriault (4)
- 2001–2002: Craig Hartsburg (4)
- 2002–2003: John Vanbiesbrouck & Steve Harrison
- 2003–2004: Marty Abrams (2)
- 2004–2005: Marty Abrams & Craig Hartsburg
- 2005–2008: Craig Hartsburg (4)
- 2008–2011: Denny Lambert (3)
- 2011–2012: Mike Stapleton
- 2012–2015: Sheldon Keefe (3)
- 2015–2018: Drew Bannister (4)
- 2018–2026: John Dean (7)
- 2026–present: Drew Bannister (4)

== Players ==
=== First round NHL entry draft picks ===
- 1981 – Ron Francis, 1st round, (4th overall) Hartford Whalers
- 1997 – Joe Thornton, 1st round, (1st overall) Boston Bruins
- 2003 – Jeff Carter, 1st round (11th overall) Philadelphia Flyers
- 2013 – Darnell Nurse, 1st round, (7th overall) Edmonton Oilers
- 2014 – Jared McCann, 1st round, (24th overall) Vancouver Canucks
- 2015 – Zachary Senyshyn, 1st round (15th overall) Boston Bruins
- 2017 – Morgan Frost, 1st round (27th overall) Philadelphia Flyers
- 2018 – Barrett Hayton, 1st round (5th overall) Arizona Coyotes
- 2018 - Rasmus Sandin, 1st Round (29th overall) Toronto Maple Leafs
- 2024 - Brady Martin, 1st Round (5th overall) Nashville Predators
- 2025 - Chase Reid, 1st Round (7th overall) Seattle Kraken

=== Retired numbers ===
- # 1 – John Vanbiesbrouck
- # 4 – Craig Hartsburg
- # 5 – Adam Foote
- # 7 – Jeff Carter
- # 10 – Ron Francis
- # 19 – Joe Thornton
- # 99 – Wayne Gretzky

=== Award winners ===
CHL Rookie of the Year

- 1995–96 - Joe Thornton

CHL Top Draft Prospect Award

- 1996–97 - Joe Thornton

CHL Goaltender of the Year

- 2001–02 - Ray Emery

Red Tilson Trophy
Most Outstanding Player

- 1973–74 - Jack Valiquette
- 1984–85 - Wayne Groulx

Eddie Powers Memorial Trophy
Scoring Champion

- 1973–74 - Jack Valiquette (tied)
- 1975–76 - Mike Kaszycki
- 1980–81 - John Goodwin

Jim Mahon Memorial Trophy
Top Scoring Right Winger

- 1996–97 - Joe Seroski

Max Kaminsky Trophy
Most Outstanding Defenceman

- 1976–77 - Craig Hartsburg
- 2009-10 - Jake Muzzin
- 2012-13 - Ryan Sproul
- 2014-15 - Tony DeAngelo

OHL Goaltender of the Year

- 2001–02 - Ray Emery

Jack Ferguson Award
First Overall Draft Pick

- 1986 - Troy Mallette
- 1989 - Eric Lindros
- 2009 - Daniel Catenacci

Dave Pinkney Trophy
Lowest Team GAA

- 1981–82 - Marc D'Amour & John Vanbiesbrouck
- 1984–85 - Scott Mosey & Marty Abrams
- 1990–91 - Mike Lenarduzzi & Kevin Hodson
- 1991–92 - Kevin Hodson
- 2017–18 - Matthew Villalta

Emms Family Award
Rookie of the Year

- 1973–74 - Jack Valiquette
- 1975–76 - John Tavella
- 1977–78 - Wayne Gretzky
- 1978–79 - John Goodwin
- 1984–85 - Derek King
- 1995–96 - Joe Thornton

F.W. "Dinty" Moore Trophy
Best Rookie GAA

- 1980–81 - John Vanbiesbrouck
- 1983–84 - Gerry Iuliano
- 1990–91 - Kevin Hodson
- 2016-17 - Matthew Villalta

William Hanley Trophy
Most Sportsmanlike Player

- 1977–78 - Wayne Gretzky
- 1980–81 - John Goodwin

=== Hockey Hall of Fame members ===
There are seven members of the Hockey Hall of Fame that have played for a team known as the Sault Ste. Marie Greyhounds. Bill Cook and Bun Cook played for the Greyhounds of the Northern Ontario Hockey Association (NOHA) between 1921 and 1925. Bill Cook was inducted in 1952, while Bun wasn't inducted until 1995 in the defunct Veteran category. Tony Esposito played for the Greyhounds of the Northern Ontario Junior Hockey League (NOJHL) during the 1962–63 season, and was inducted into the Hall in 1988.

The current junior Greyhounds have four alumni inducted into Hockey Hall of Fame. They are Wayne Gretzky, Paul Coffey, Ron Francis, and Joe Thornton who were respectively inducted in 1999, 2004, 2007, and 2025 respectively.

=== NHL alumni ===
1919 to 1945, 1949 to 1958 (NOHA )

- Jack Bionda
- Stan Brown
- Eddie Burke
- Francis Cain
- Ed Chadwick
- William "Chick" Chalmers
- Bill Cook
- Bun Cook
- Vic Desjardins
- Bob Dill
- Babe Donnelly
- Alvin Fisher
- Don Grosso
- Jim Henry
- Albert Holway
- Pete Horeck
- Ron Hurst
- Joe Klukay
- Julian Klymkiw
- Pentti Lund
- Clare Martin
- Jim McBurney
- Gerry Munro
- Gerry Odrowski
- Peanuts O'Flaherty
- Merlyn Phillips
- Nels Podolsky
- George Robertson
- Ron Rowe
- Harry Taylor
- Flat Walsh
- John Webster
- Steve Wojciechowski

1962 to 1972 (NOJHL )

- Ivan Boldirev
- Tony Esposito
- Jerry Korab
- Wayne Maki
- Jim Wiley
- Mike Zuke

1972 to present (OHA / OMJHL / OHL)

- Brad Aitken
- Bobby Babcock
- Justin Bailey
- Reid Bailey
- Drew Bannister
- Bruce Bell
- Paul Beraldo
- Jeff Beukeboom
- Mike Boland
- Bob Boughner
- David Broll
- Garrett Burnett
- Andrew Campbell
- Jack Campbell
- Jeff Carter
- Daniel Catenacci
- Dan Cloutier
- Paul Coffey
- Tim Coulis
- Nick Cousins
- Dan Currie
- Marc D'Amour
- Trevor Daley
- Andrew Desjardins
- Gord Dineen
- Ray Emery
- John English
- Rico Fata
- Chris Felix
- Peter Fiorentino
- Adam Foote
- Mike Fountain
- Ron Francis
- Morgan Frost
- Sean Gagnon
- Steve Gatzos
- Tyler Gaudet
- Aaron Gavey
- Tim Gettinger
- Steve Graves
- Wayne Gretzky
- Wayne Groulx
- Ron Handy
- Dave Hannan
- Craig Hartsburg
- Barrett Hayton
- Dan Hinton
- Kevin Hodson
- Mike Hordy
- Ralph Intranuovo
- Ric Jackman
- Ryan Jardine
- Dustin Jeffrey
- Tye Kartye
- Mike Kaszycki
- Tyler Kennedy
- Derek King
- Denny Lambert
- Tyler Larter
- Robin Lehner
- Mike Lenarduzzi
- Danny Lucas
- Troy Mallette
- Jared McCann
- Brian McGrattan
- Greg Millen
- Colin Miller
- Marc Moro
- Adam Munro
- Matt Murray
- Jake Muzzin
- Jordan Nolan
- Ted Nolan
- Darnell Nurse
- Matt O'Connor
- Doug Patey
- Jim Pavese
- Chad Penney
- Nathan Perrott
- Wayne Presley
- Bob Probert
- Gerry Rioux
- Nick Ritchie
- Ken Sabourin
- Rasmus Sandin
- Zach Senyshyn
- Doug Shedden
- Charlie Simmer
- Wayne Simmonds
- Chris Simon
- Steve Smith
- Blake Speers
- Ryan Sproul
- Brad Staubitz
- Jeremy Stevenson
- Steve Sullivan
- Petr Taticek
- Bill Terry
- Joe Thornton
- Brad Tiley
- Conor Timmins
- Jiri Tlusty
- Rick Tocchet
- Sergei Tolchinsky
- Jeff Toms
- Eric Vail
- Jack Valiquette
- John Vanbiesbrouck
- Josef Vasicek
- Dave Watson
- Paul Woods
- Rob Zettler

=== Other notable alumni ===
Jim Aldred played for the Greyhounds from 1981 to 1983, and later became coach of the Portugal men's national ice hockey team.

== Season-by-season results ==
Regular season and playoffs results:

- 1962–1972: Northern Ontario Junior Hockey Association
- 1972–1974: Ontario Hockey Association Major Junior A Series
- 1974–1980: Ontario Major Junior Hockey League
- 1980–present: Ontario Hockey League

Legend: GP = Games played, W = Wins, L = Losses, T = Ties, OTL = Overtime losses, SL = Shoot-out losses, Pts = Points, GF = Goals for, GA = Goals against

Memorial Cup champions	League champions	League finalists

Season	Regular season											Playoffs
Season	GP	W	L	T	OTL	SOL	Pts	Pct	GF	GA	Finish	Playoffs
1962–63	40	28	11	1	–	–	57	0.713	195	105	1st NOJHA	Lost in semifinals
1963–64	40	20	18	2	–	–	42	0.525	179	202	4th NOJHA	Lost in finals
1964–65	40	24	15	1	–	–	49	0.613	247	172	2nd NOJHA	Lost in semifinals
1965–66	40	23	15	2	–	–	48	0.600	236	182	2nd NOJHA	Lost in finals
1966–67	40	30	10	0	–	–	60	0.750	290	153	1st NOJHA	McNamara Trophy Champions
1967–68	40	24	14	2	–	–	50	0.625	175	141	1st NOJHA	Lost in semifinals
1968–69	48	34	12	2	–	–	70	0.729	236	152	1st NOJHA	Lost in finals
1969–70	48	34	11	3	–	–	71	0.740	317	195	1st NOJHA	McNamara Trophy Champions; Lost Eastern Canada semifinals (Montreal Junior Canadiens) 4–1
1970–71	48	32	14	2	–	–	66	0.688	295	187	2nd NOJHA	Lost in finals
1971–72	52	31	14	7	–	–	69	0.663	272	203	1st NOJHA	McNamara Trophy Champions
Greyhounds admitted as an expansion team to the Ontario Hockey Association Major Junior A Series
1972–73	63	11	42	10	–	–	32	0.254	244	396	10th OHA	Did not qualify
1973–74	70	24	40	6	–	–	54	0.386	295	352	9th OHA	Did not qualify
1974–75	70	25	36	9	–	–	59	0.421	312	367	10th OMJHL	Did not qualify
1975–76	66	27	26	13	–	–	67	0.508	341	319	5th Leyden	Won preliminary round (Oshawa Generals) 6–4; Lost quarterfinals (Sudbury Wolves) 9–5
1976–77	66	20	41	5	–	–	45	0.341	261	375	5th Leyden	Won preliminary round (Peterborough Petes) 3–1; Lost quarterfinals (Ottawa 67's) 4–0–1
1977–78	68	26	32	10	–	–	62	0.456	330	346	5th Leyden	Won preliminary round (Kingston Canadians) 6–4; Lost quarterfinals (Ottawa 67's) 9–7
1978–79	68	26	42	0	–	–	52	0.382	317	415	6th Leyden	Did not qualify
1979–80	68	22	45	1	–	–	45	0.331	281	379	6th Leyden	Did not qualify
1980–81	68	47	19	2	–	–	96	0.706	412	290	1st Leyden	Won division semifinals (Oshawa Generals) 8–4; Won division finals (Kingston Canadians) 9–5; Lost OHL finals (Kitchener Rangers) 9–3
1981–82	68	40	25	3	–	–	83	0.610	274	243	2nd Emms	Won division semifinals (Brantford Alexanders) 8–6; Lost division finals (Kitchener Rangers) 9–3
1982–83	70	48	21	1	–	–	97	0.693	363	270	1st Emms	Won division semifinals (Brantford Alexanders) 8–2; Won division finals (Kitchener Rangers) 8–2; Lost OHL finals (Oshawa Generals) 9–5
1983–84	70	38	28	4	–	–	80	0.571	373	321	3rd Emms	Won division quarterfinals (Windsor Spitfires) 6–0; Won division semifinals (Brantford Alexanders) 8–4; Lost division finals (Kitchener Rangers) 8–6
1984–85	66	54	11	1	–	–	109	0.826	381	215	1st Emms	Won division quarterfinals (Kitchener Rangers) 8–0; Bye through division semifinals Won division finals (Hamilton Steelhawks) 9–1; Won OHL finals (Peterborough Petes) 9–5; Lost 1985 Memorial Cup semifinal (Prince Albert Raiders) 8–3
1985–86	66	15	48	3	–	–	33	0.250	263	387	8th Emms	Did not qualify
1986–87	66	31	31	4	–	–	66	0.500	301	299	5th Emms	Lost division quarterfinals (Windsor Spitfires) 4–0
1987–88	66	32	33	1	–	–	65	0.492	272	294	5th Emms	Lost division quarterfinals (London Knights) 4–2
1988–89	66	21	43	2	–	–	44	0.333	227	304	8th Emms	Did not qualify
1989–90	66	18	42	6	–	–	42	0.318	229	289	7th Emms	Did not qualify
1990–91	66	42	21	3	–	–	87	0.659	303	217	1st Emms	Won division quarterfinals (Dukes of Hamilton) 4–0; Bye through division semifinals Won division finals (Niagara Falls Thunder) 4–0; Won OHL finals (Oshawa Generals) 4–2; 4th place at 1991 Memorial Cup
1991–92	66	41	19	6	–	–	88	0.667	335	229	1st Emms	Won division semifinals (Kitchener Rangers) 4–3; Won division finals (Niagara Falls Thunder) 4–1; Won OHL finals (North Bay Centennials) 4–3; Lost 1992 Memorial Cup final (Kamloops Blazers) 5–4
1992–93	66	38	23	5	–	–	81	0.614	334	260	1st Emms	Won Super Series to host 1993 Memorial Cup (Peterborough Petes) 4–0; Won division semifinals (Owen Sound Platers) 4–0; Won division finals (Detroit Junior Red Wings) 4–1; Lost OHL finals (Peterborough Petes) 4–1; Won 1993 Memorial Cup final (Peterborough Petes) 4–2
1993–94	66	35	24	7	–	–	77	0.583	319	268	2nd Emms	Won division quarterfinals (Windsor Spitfires) 4–0; Won division semifinals (Guelph Storm) 4–0; Lost semifinals (Detroit Junior Red Wings)
1994–95	66	17	45	4	–	–	38	0.288	228	346	5th Western	Did not qualify
1995–96	66	38	23	5	–	–	81	0.614	312	254	3rd Western	Lost division quarterfinals (Sarnia Sting) 4–0
1996–97	66	39	17	10	–	–	88	0.667	309	220	1st Western	Won division quarterfinals (Detroit Whalers) 4–1; Lost quarterfinals (Guelph Storm) 4–2
1997–98	66	20	39	7	–	–	47	0.356	232	296	5th Western	Did not qualify
1998–99	68	31	29	8	–	–	70	0.515	244	242	4th West	Lost conference quarterfinals (Owen Sound Platers) 4–1
1999–2000	68	37	20	6	5	–	85	0.588	270	217	2nd West	Won conference quarterfinals (Kitchener Rangers) 4–1; Won conference semifinals (Erie Otters) 4–3; Lost conference finals (Plymouth Whalers) 4–1
2000–01	68	23	38	4	3	–	53	0.368	188	256	5th West	Did not qualify
2001–02	68	38	20	10	0	–	86	0.632	237	200	2nd West	Lost conference quarterfinals (Windsor Spitfires) 4–2
2002–03	68	26	33	6	3	–	61	0.426	232	284	4th West	Lost conference quarterfinals (Kitchener Rangers) 4–0
2003–04	68	30	34	3	1	–	64	0.463	196	223	4th West	Did not qualify
2004–05	68	33	25	9	1	–	76	0.551	210	188	1st West	Lost conference quarterfinals (Windsor Spitfires) 4–3
2005–06	68	29	31	–	3	5	66	0.485	201	213	4th West	Lost conference quarterfinals (London Knights) 4–0
2006–07	68	37	23	–	1	7	82	0.603	227	219	3rd West	Won conference quarterfinals (Saginaw Spirit) 4–2; Lost conference semifinals (London Knights) 4–3
2007–08	68	44	18	–	2	4	94	0.691	247	173	1st West	Won conference quarterfinals (Saginaw Spirit) 4–0; Won conference semifinals (Guelph Storm) 4–1; Lost conference finals (Kitchener Rangers) 4–1
2008–09	68	19	45	–	2	2	42	0.309	172	290	5th West	Did not qualify
2009–10	68	36	27	–	1	4	77	0.566	237	213	3rd West	Lost conference quarterfinals (Plymouth Whalers) 4–1
2010–11	68	24	36	–	5	3	56	0.412	238	277	5th West	Did not qualify
2011–12	68	29	33	–	2	4	64	0.471	227	272	5th West	Did not qualify
2012–13	68	36	26	–	3	3	78	0.574	262	257	2nd West	Lost conference quarterfinals (Owen Sound Attack) 4–2
2013–14	68	44	17	–	2	5	95	0.699	267	198	1st West	Won conference quarterfinals (Owen Sound Attack) 4–1; Lost conference semifinals (Erie Otters) 4–0
2014–15	68	54	12	–	0	2	110	0.809	342	196	1st West	Won conference quarterfinals (Saginaw Spirit) 4–0; Won conference semifinals (Guelph Storm) 4–0; Lost conference finals (Erie Otters) 4–2
2015–16	68	33	27	–	7	1	74	0.544	243	233	3rd West	Won conference quarterfinals (Sarnia Sting) 4–3; Lost conference semifinals (Erie Otters) 4–1
2016–17	68	48	16	–	3	1	100	0.735	287	208	1st West	Won conference quarterfinals (Flint Firebirds) 4–1; Lost conference semifinals (Owen Sound Attack) 4–2
2017–18	68	55	7	–	3	3	116	0.841	317	186	1st West	Won conference quarterfinals (Saginaw Spirit) 4–0; Won conference semifinals (Owen Sound Attack) 4–3; Won conference finals (Kitchener Rangers) 4–3; Lost OHL finals (Hamilton Bulldogs 4–2
2018–19	68	44	16	–	7	1	96	0.706	292	224	2nd West	Won conference quarterfinals (Owen Sound Attack) 4–1; Lost conference semifinals (Saginaw Spirit) 4–2
2019–20	64	29	31	–	3	1	62	0.484	253	257	4th West	Playoffs cancelled due to the COVID-19 pandemic
2020–21	Season cancelled due to the COVID-19 pandemic											
2021–22	68	39	22	–	6	1	85	0.625	295	246	3rd West	Won conference quarterfinals (Guelph Storm) 4–1; Lost conference semifinals (Flint Firebirds) 4–1
2022–23	68	20	33	–	9	6	55	0.404	223	310	5th West	Did not qualify
2023–24	68	45	18	–	3	2	95	0.699	286	215	2nd West	Won conference quarterfinals (Guelph Storm) 4–0; Lost conference semifinals (Saginaw Spirit) 4–3
2024–25	68	29	35	–	2	2	62	0.456	226	268	4th West	Lost conference quarterfinals (Windsor Spitfires) 4–1
2025–26	68	39	23	–	1	5	84	0.618	251	204	3rd West	Won conference quarterfinals (London Knights) 4–1; Lost conference semifinals (Kitchener Rangers) 4–1

== Uniforms and logos ==

The Greyhounds colours are predominantly red and white, with uniforms in a style very similar to the Detroit Red Wings. Black and silver trim were added in the late 1980s, as well as four stars above the logo. Sault Ste. Marie has used their classic red circle logo with the running greyhound for all but three seasons of their existence.

From 1996 to 1999 the Greyhounds redesigned their logo (inset right), to what became known by fans as the "Ugly Dog" or "Snoopy" logo. Due to public backlash and a fan petition for its removal, the team discontinued its use and went back to the classic logo. For the 2009-10 switchover to the Reebok Edge jersey system, the Greyhounds returned to their classic jerseys from the 1970s and early 80s, including removing black & silver from their logo. In 2013, the team switched to jerseys identical to those of the NHL's Detroit Red Wings.

The Greyhounds have used third jerseys since 2006, when the team introduced a black third jersey with a "Soo Greyhounds" script logo, as well as red, white, and grey trim, and stars around the waist. The jersey was slightly updated for its 2010 return after the Reebok Edge switchover, but was completely replaced in 2013 in favour of a simpler red third jersey with the running greyhound as the main logo, and a white nameplate with red lettering.

== Arenas ==
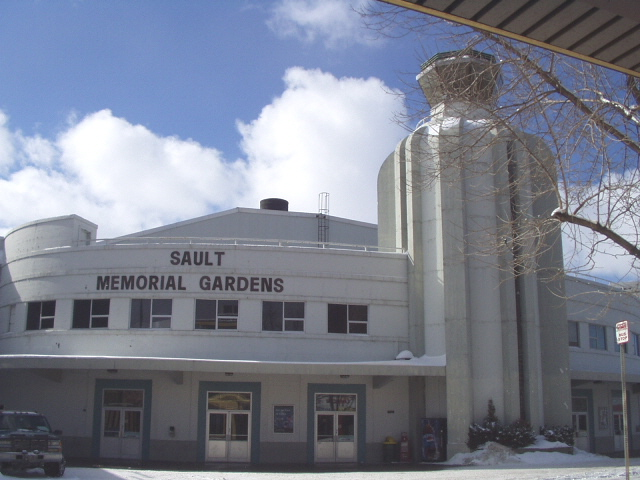
Sault Memorial Gardens

GFL Memorial Gardens with old Steelback Centre logo

The first home of the Greyhounds from 1919 to 1945 was Gouin Street Arena. The arena had wooden benches for 1,000 spectators. It was destroyed by fire in 1945. An outdoor rink at Pullar Stadium in Sault Ste. Marie, Michigan was used until a new indoor facility was built. The Greyhounds returned to Sault Ste. Marie, Michigan again in 1979, playing for about a month at Taffy Abel Arena on the campus of Lake Superior State University due to emergency roof repairs at the Gardens.

The Greyhounds played home games at the Sault Memorial Gardens from 1949 to 2006. The building was named for the war veterans of World War II. The Gardens hosted Memorial Cup games in 1978 and 1993, and the OHL All-Star Game in 1979. The last game at the Gardens was played on Tuesday, March 28, 2006. Demolition of the Gardens began on April 27, 2006. All that remains of the Gardens is the Memorial Tower, which is part of "Memorial Square". The red beacon of the Memorial Tower was preserved and continues to be lit on game days.

The Greyhounds moved to the new GFL Memorial Gardens (formerly named the Steelback Centre and the Essar Centre) for the 2006–07 OHL season. The new arena was built in the east parking lot of the Memorial Gardens, and is the largest such centre in Northern Ontario. Its naming rights are currently held by GFL Environmental. The inaugural game was played on October 11, 2006, resulting in a 2–1 loss to the Sudbury Wolves. The 2008 OHL All-Star Classic was held at the Essar Centre during the 2007–08 season.

== Media ==
Since the 2009–10 season, Greyhounds' games have been broadcast on the radio by Rock 101 in neighbouring Sault Ste. Marie, Michigan, after previously airing on Q104 and CKCY. Most regular season and playoff games for the Greyhounds are broadcast on Shaw Spotlight in Sault Ste. Marie.

== See also ==
- List of ice hockey teams in Ontario
