= Muzz =

Muzz may refer to:

- Muzz (dating app) - a Muslim Marriage app
- Muzz (musician), British electronic music artist
- Muzz (band), an American rock supergroup
- Muzz Buzz, Australian coffee chain
- Murray "Muzz" MacPherson (born 1938), English ice hockey player
  - Muzz MacPherson Award
- Muzz Murray (1891–1961), American ice hockey player
- Muzz Patrick (1915–1998), Canadian ice hockey player
- Muzz Skillings, American bassist for Living Colour
