= 2001–02 OHL season =

Junior ice hockey season

- League: Ontario Hockey League
- Sport: Hockey
- Duration: Preseason; August 2001 – September 2001; Regular season September 2001 – March 2002; Playoffs; March 2002 – May 2002
- Teams: 20
- TV partner(s): Rogers TV, TVCogeco, Shaw TV

Draft
- Top draft pick: Patrick O'Sullivan
- Picked by: Mississauga IceDogs

Regular season
- Hamilton Spectator Trophy: Erie Otters (1)
- Season MVP: Brad Boyes (Erie Otters)
- Top scorer: Nathan Robinson (Belleville Bulls)

Playoffs
- Playoffs MVP: Brad Boyes (Otters)
- Finals champions: Barrie Colts (1)
- Runners-up: Erie Otters

OHL seasons
- 2000–01 2002–03

2001–02 CHL season
- League: Canadian Hockey League
- Sport: Hockey
- Duration: OHL; September 2001 – March 2002; QMJHL; September 2001 – March 2002; WHL; September 2001 – March 2002
- Teams: 60
- TV partner(s): RDS; Rogers Sportsnet; Rogers TV; Shaw TV
- Season MVP: Pierre-Marc Bouchard (Chicoutimi Saguenéens) (QMJHL)
- Top scorer: Pierre-Marc Bouchard (Chicoutimi Saguenéens) (QMJHL)

Memorial Cup
- Finals champions: Kootenay Ice (WHL) (2nd title)
- Runners-up: Victoriaville Tigres (QMJHL)

The 2001–02 OHL season was the 22nd season of the Ontario Hockey League. Twenty teams each played 68 games. The Erie Otters defeated the Barrie Colts for the J. Ross Robertson Cup.

== Regular season ==
=== Final standings ===
Note: DIV = Division; GP = Games played; W = Wins; L = Losses; T = Ties; OTL = Overtime losses; GF = Goals for; GA = Goals against; PTS = Points; x = clinched playoff berth; y = clinched division title; z = clinched conference title

=== Eastern conference ===
Rank	Team	DIV	GP	W	L	T	OTL	PTS	GF	GA
1	z-Toronto St. Michael's Majors	Central	68	40	19	8	1	89	230	177
2	y-Belleville Bulls	East	68	39	23	4	2	84	279	218
3	x-Barrie Colts	Central	68	38	19	9	2	87	226	192
4	x-Ottawa 67's	East	68	36	20	10	2	84	262	218
5	x-Peterborough Petes	East	68	33	22	7	6	79	242	215
6	x-Sudbury Wolves	Central	68	25	33	5	5	60	171	216
7	x-Oshawa Generals	East	68	23	33	7	5	58	205	247
8	x-North Bay Centennials	Central	68	18	37	8	5	49	185	247
9	Kingston Frontenacs	East	68	18	37	9	4	49	197	272
10	Mississauga IceDogs	Central	68	11	47	6	4	32	212	327

=== Western conference ===
Rank	Team	DIV	GP	W	L	T	OTL	PTS	GF	GA
1	z-Plymouth Whalers	West	68	39	15	12	2	92	249	166
2	y-Erie Otters	Midwest	68	41	22	4	1	87	246	218
3	x-Sault Ste. Marie Greyhounds	West	68	38	20	10	0	86	237	200
4	x-Guelph Storm	Midwest	68	37	23	7	1	82	264	235
5	x-Kitchener Rangers	Midwest	68	35	22	10	1	81	257	190
6	x-Windsor Spitfires	West	68	33	24	6	5	77	253	229
7	x-Sarnia Sting	West	68	27	29	5	7	66	236	260
8	x-London Knights	West	68	24	27	10	7	65	210	249
9	Owen Sound Attack	Midwest	68	24	31	10	3	61	200	240
10	Brampton Battalion	Midwest	68	26	35	5	2	59	215	258

=== Scoring leaders ===
Player	Team	GP	G	A	Pts	PIM
Nathan Robinson	Belleville Bulls	67	47	63	110	74
Mike Renzi	Belleville Bulls	68	44	64	108	127
Jason Spezza	Windsor Spitfires/Belleville Bulls	53	42	63	105	42
Kris Newbury	Sarnia Sting	66	42	62	104	141
Cory Pecker	Erie Otters	56	53	46	99	108
Dustin Jamieson	Sarnia Sting	68	44	53	97	33
Darryl Bootland	Toronto St. Michael's Majors	61	41	56	97	137
Miguel Delisle	Ottawa 67's	67	55	40	95	73
Patrick O'Sullivan	Mississauga IceDogs	68	34	58	92	61
Mike Stathopoulos	London Knights	68	28	62	90	24

Zenon Konopka had the most assists (68).

== Playoffs ==
Conference quarterfinals
E1	Toronto	4
E8	North Bay	0
E4	Ottawa	4
E5	Peterborough	2
E3	Barrie	4
E6	Sudbury	1
E2	Belleville	4
E7	Oshawa	1
W1	Plymouth	2
W8	London	4
W2	Erie	4
W7	Sarnia	1
W3	S.S. Marie	3
W6	Windsor	4
W4	Guelph	4
W5	Kitchener	0

Conference semifinals
E1	Toronto	4
E4	Ottawa	3
E3	Barrie	4
E2	Belleville	2
W8	London	2
W2	Erie	4
W6	Windsor	4
W4	Guelph	1

Conference finals
E1	Toronto	0
E3	Barrie	4
W2	Erie	4
W6	Windsor	1

Finals
E3	Barrie	1
W2	Erie	4

=== Conference quarterfinals ===
==== Eastern conference ====
Toronto (1) vs. North Bay (8)
Date	Away	Home	
March 21	North Bay 1	5 Toronto	
March 23	Toronto 5	0 North Bay	
March 24	North Bay 5	6 Toronto	OT
March 26	Toronto 5	2 North Bay	
Toronto wins series 4–0

Barrie (3) vs. Sudbury (6)
Date	Away	Home	
March 23	Sudbury 1	4 Barrie	
March 25	Barrie 2	1 Sudbury	
March 26	Sudbury 4	3 Barrie	OT
March 28	Barrie 3	2 Sudbury	
March 30	Sudbury 3	4 Barrie	
Barrie wins series 4–1

Belleville (2) vs. Oshawa (7)
Date	Away	Home	
March 22	Belleville 3	4 Oshawa	
March 25	Oshawa 0	3 Belleville	
March 27	Oshawa 1	2 Belleville	
March 29	Belleville 5	4 Oshawa	OT
March 30	Oshawa 2	3 Belleville	
Belleville wins series 4–1

Ottawa (4) vs. Peterborough (5)
Date	Away	Home	
March 22	Peterborough 2	3 Ottawa	
March 24	Ottawa 5	2 Peterborough	
March 26	Peterborough 5	2 Ottawa	
March 28	Ottawa 3	6 Peterborough	
March 29	Peterborough 1	2 Ottawa	OT
March 31	Ottawa 5	3 Peterborough	
Ottawa wins series 4–2

==== Western conference ====
Plymouth (1) vs. London (8)
Date	Away	Home
March 22	London 2	3 Plymouth
March 24	Plymouth 1	4 London
March 26	London 3	2 Plymouth
March 28	Plymouth 2	3 London
March 30	London 2	4 Plymouth
March 31	Plymouth 1	3 London
London wins series 4–2

Sault Ste. Marie (3) vs. Windsor (6)
Date	Away	Home
March 22	Windsor 2	4 Sault Ste. Marie
March 23	Windsor 5	2 Sault Ste. Marie
March 27	Sault Ste. Marie 3	6 Windsor
March 28	Sault Ste. Marie 0	3 Windsor
March 30	Windsor 0	4 Sault Ste. Marie
March 31	Sault Ste. Marie 1	5 Windsor
Windsor wins series 4–2

Erie (2) vs. Sarnia (7)
Date	Away	Home	
March 22	Sarnia 1	4 Erie	
March 23	Sarnia 3	6 Erie	
March 26	Erie 3	4 Sarnia	OT
March 27	Erie 5	1 Sarnia	
March 29	Sarnia 4	7 Erie	
Erie wins series 4–1

Guelph (4) vs. Kitchener (5)
Date	Away	Home
March 22	Kitchener 1	2 Guelph
March 24	Guelph 4	2 Kitchener
March 26	Kitchener 1	7 Guelph
March 28	Guelph 4	3 Kitchener
Guelph wins series 4–0

=== Conference semifinals ===
Eastern conference

Toronto (1) vs. Ottawa (4)
Date	Away	Home
April 3	Ottawa 3	2 Toronto
April 5	Toronto 5	4 Ottawa
April 7	Ottawa 2	6 Toronto
April 9	Toronto 1	8 Ottawa
April 11	Ottawa 4	6 Toronto
April 12	Toronto 2	4 Ottawa
April 14	Ottawa 3	4 Toronto
Toronto wins series 4–3

Belleville (2) vs. Barrie (3)
Date	Away	Home	
April 6	Barrie 1	3 Belleville	
April 8	Belleville 2	3 Barrie	OT
April 10	Barrie 3	2 Belleville	
April 12	Belleville 2	3 Barrie	OT
April 13	Barrie 1	3 Belleville	
April 15	Belleville 2	3 Barrie	OT
Barrie wins series 4–2

Western conference

Erie (2) vs. London (8)
Date	Away	Home	
April 4	London 4	3 Erie	
April 5	Erie 6	4 London	
April 7	London 2	3 Erie	
April 11	Erie 3	4 London	OT
April 13	London 1	8 Erie	
April 15	Erie 5	4 London	OT
Erie wins series 4–2

Guelph (4) vs. Windsor (6)
Date	Away	Home	
April 5	Windsor 7	3 Guelph	
April 7	Guelph 4	5 Windsor	
April 9	Windsor 4	3 Guelph	OT
April 11	Guelph 4	3 Windsor	OT
April 12	Windsor 4	1 Guelph	
Windsor wins series 4–1

=== Conference finals ===
Eastern conference

Toronto (1) vs. Barrie (3)
Date	Away	Home	
April 19	Barrie 4	3 Toronto	
April 21	Toronto 2	6 Barrie	
April 22	Barrie 3	2 Toronto	OT
April 24	Toronto 0	3 Barrie	
Barrie wins series 4–0

Western conference

Erie (2) vs. Windsor (6)
Date	Away	Home	
April 19	Windsor 1	2 Erie	OT
April 21	Erie 7	4 Windsor	
April 23	Windsor 2	3 Erie	
April 25	Erie 4	6 Windsor	
April 27	Windsor 1	6 Erie	
Erie wins series 4–1

=== J. Ross Robertson Cup finals ===
Erie (2) vs. Barrie (3)
Date	Away	Home	
May 1	Barrie 1	3 Erie	
May 3	Erie 4	3 Barrie	
May 6	Barrie 1	4 Erie	
May 8	Erie 2	5 Barrie	
May 10	Barrie 1	2 Erie	OT
Erie wins series 4–1

=== J. Ross Robertson Cup Champions Roster ===
2001-02 Erie Otters
Goaltenders: (Canada) 30 – Thomas Lee; (Canada) 38 – Adam Munro; (Canada) 40 – T.J. Aceti	Defencemen: (Canada) 4 – Chris Eade; (United States) 5 – Brian Lee; (Canada) 6 – Mike McKeown; (Canada) 7 – Noel Coultice; (Canada) 8 – Carlo Colaiacovo; (Canada) 14 – Chris Campoli; (Canada) 21 – Chris Martin	Wingers: (Canada) 11 – Cory Pecker; (Canada) 19 – Brandon Cullen; (Canada) 22 – Mike Rice; (Canada) 23 – Scott Dobben; (Canada) 27 – Jeffrey Doyle; (Canada) 28 – Brad Bonello; (Czech Republic) 31 – Michal Kokavec; (Canada) 37 – David Herring	Centres: (Canada) 12 – Chris Berti; (Canada) 16 – Brad Boyes - C; (Canada) 17 – Sean Courtney; (Ukraine) 39 – Alex Karaulchuk; Coach: (Canada) Dave MacQueen; General Manager: (Canada) Sherwood Bassin

== All-Star teams ==
=== First team ===
- Brad Boyes, Centre, Erie Otters
- Nathan Robinson, Left Wing, Belleville Bulls
- Cory Pecker, Right Wing, Erie Otters
- Erik Reitz, Defence, Barrie Colts
- Mark Popovic, Defence, Toronto St. Michael's Majors
- Ray Emery, Goaltender, Sault Ste. Marie Greyhounds
- Craig Hartsburg, Coach, Sault Ste. Marie Greyhounds

=== Second team ===
- Kris Newbury, Centre, Sarnia Sting
- Steve Ott, Left Wing, Windsor Spitfires
- Mike Renzi, Right Wing, Belleville Bulls
- Carlo Colaiacovo, Defence, Erie Otters
- Steve Eminger, Defence, Kitchener Rangers
- Peter Budaj, Goaltender, Toronto St. Michael's Majors
- Dave Cameron, Coach, Toronto St. Michael's Majors

=== Third team ===
- Jason Spezza, Centre, Belleville Bulls
- Rick Nash, Left Wing, London Knights
- Miguel Delisle, Right Wing, Ottawa 67's
- Kevin Dallman, Defence, Guelph Storm
- Fedor Tyutin, Defence, Guelph Storm
- David Chant, Goaltender, Barrie Colts
- Dave MacQueen, Coach, Erie Otters

== Awards ==
J. Ross Robertson Cup:	Erie Otters
Hamilton Spectator Trophy:	Plymouth Whalers
Bobby Orr Trophy:	Barrie Colts
Wayne Gretzky Trophy:	Erie Otters
Leyden Trophy:	Belleville Bulls
Emms Trophy:	Toronto St. Michael's Majors
Holody Trophy:	Erie Otters
Bumbacco Trophy:	Plymouth Whalers
Red Tilson Trophy:	Brad Boyes, Erie Otters
Eddie Powers Memorial Trophy:	Nathan Robinson, Belleville Bulls
Matt Leyden Trophy:	Craig Hartsburg, Sault Ste. Marie Greyhounds
Jim Mahon Memorial Trophy:	Matt Renzi, Belleville Bulls
Max Kaminsky Trophy:	Eric Reitz, Barrie Colts
OHL Goaltender of the Year:	Ray Emery, Sault Ste. Marie Greyhounds
Jack Ferguson Award:	Rob Schremp, Mississauga IceDogs
Dave Pinkney Trophy:	Jason Bacashihua and Paul Drew, Plymouth Whalers
OHL Executive of the Year:	Sherwood Bassin, Erie Otters
Bill Long Award:	Jack Ferguson & Jim Lever, Ontario Hockey League
Emms Family Award:	Patrick O'Sullivan, Mississauga IceDogs
F.W. 'Dinty' Moore Trophy:	Jason Bacashihua, Plymouth Whalers
OHL Humanitarian of the Year:	David Silverstone, Belleville Bulls
William Hanley Trophy:	Brad Boyes, Erie Otters
Leo Lalonde Memorial Trophy:	Cory Pecker, Erie Otters
Bobby Smith Trophy:	Dustin Brown, Guelph Storm
Wayne Gretzky 99 Award:	Brad Boyes, Erie Otters

== 2002 OHL Priority Selection ==
On May 4, 2002, the OHL conducted the 2002 Ontario Hockey League Priority Selection. The Mississauga IceDogs held the first overall pick in the draft, and selected Rob Schremp from the Syracuse Stars. Schremp was awarded the Jack Ferguson Award, awarded to the top pick in the draft.

Below are the players who were selected in the first round of the 2002 Ontario Hockey League Priority Selection.

#	Player	Nationality	OHL Team	Hometown	Minor Team
1	Rob Schremp (C)	United States	Mississauga IceDogs	Fulton, New York	Syracuse Stars
2	Wes O'Neill (D)	Canada	Kingston Frontenacs	Essex, Ontario	Chatham Maroons
3	Wojtek Wolski (RW)	Canada	Brampton Battalion	Mississauga, Ontario	St. Michael's Buzzers
4	Dan LaCosta (G)	Canada	Owen Sound Attack	Labrador City, Newfoundland	Wellington Dukes
5	Jean-Michel Rizk (RW)	Canada	Sudbury Wolves	Durham, Quebec	Sudbury Nickel Barons
6	Adam Berti (LW)	Canada	Oshawa Generals	Oshawa, Ontario	Oshawa Kiwanis
7	Brett Connolly (C)	Canada	Sudbury Wolves	Pickering, Ontario	Ajax-Pickering Raiders
8	Dave Bolland (C)	Canada	London Knights	Etobicoke, Ontario	Toronto Red Wings
9	Todd Perry (D)	Canada	Sarnia Sting	Ingleside, Ontario	Char-Lan Rebels
10	Mitch Maunu (D)	Canada	Windsor Spitfires	Thunder Bay, Ontario	Thunder Bay Kings
11	Jordan Morrison (LW)	Canada	Peterborough Petes	Uxbridge, Ontario	Toronto Red Wings
12	Evan McGrath (C)	Canada	Kitchener Rangers	Oakville, Ontario	Oakville Blades
13	Ryan Garlock (C)	Canada	Guelph Storm	Iroquois Falls, Ontario	Timmins Majors
14	Kyle Wharton (D)	Canada	Ottawa 67's	Stittsville, Ontario	Ottawa Valley Silver Seven
15	Mike Duncan (D)	Canada	Belleville Bulls	Mount Brydges, Ontario	Mount Brydges Bulldogs
16	Tyler Kennedy (RW)	Canada	Sault Ste. Marie Greyhounds	Sault Ste. Marie, Ontario	Sault Ste. Marie North Stars
17	Hunter Tremblay (LW)	Canada	Barrie Colts	Timmins, Ontario	Timmins Majors
18	Michael Blunden (RW)	Canada	Erie Otters	Orleans, Ontario	Gloucester Midget
19	Scott Lehman (D)	Canada	Toronto St. Michael's Majors	Windsor, Ontario	Tecumseh Chiefs
20	Taylor Raszka (RW)	United States	Plymouth Whalers	Sylvania, Ohio	Detroit Red Wings Midget

== See also ==
- List of OHA Junior A standings
- List of OHL seasons
- 2002 Memorial Cup
- 2002 NHL entry draft
- 2001 in sports
- 2002 in sports

Preceded by 2000–01 OHL season	OHL seasons	Succeeded by 2002–03 OHL season
