= Brian Lee (ice hockey, born 1984) =

American ice hockey player

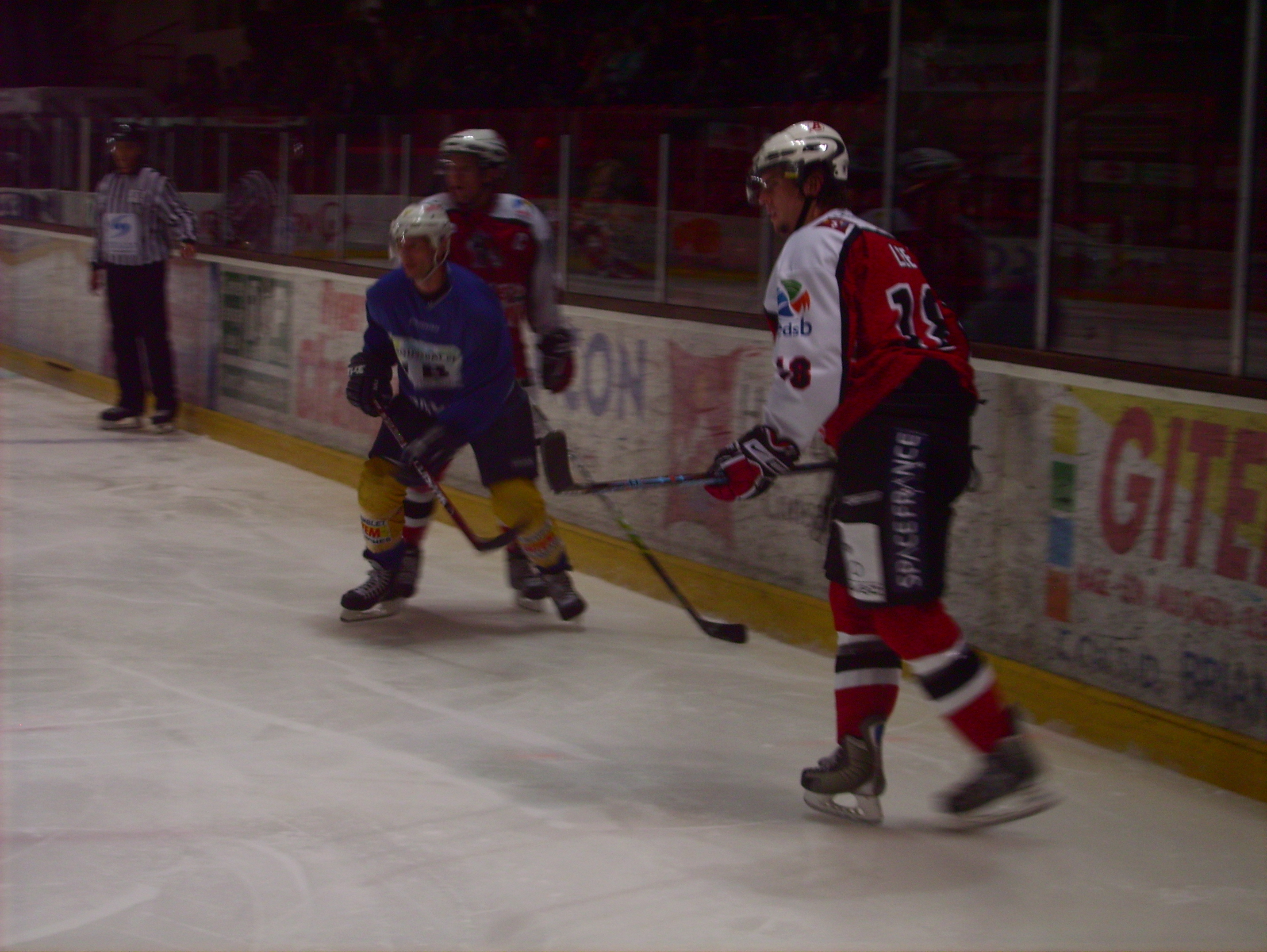
- Brian Lee
- Born: July 5, 1984 (age 42) Berrien Springs, Michigan, U.S.
- Height: 6 ft 3 in (191 cm)
- Weight: 198 lb (90 kg; 14 st 2 lb)
- Position: Defense
- Shot: Left
- Played for: AHL; Cincinnati Mighty Ducks; Norfolk Admirals; Chicago Wolves; ECHL; Greenville Grrrowl; Gwinnett Gladiators; Stockton Thunder; France; Diables Rouges de Briançon; EIHL; Coventry Blaze; Serie A WSV Sterzing – SSI Vipiteno Broncos
- NHL draft: 71st overall, 2002; Mighty Ducks of Anaheim
- Playing career: 2003–2012

Brian Lee (born July 5, 1984) is an American former professional ice hockey player. Lee was selected by the Mighty Ducks of Anaheim in the 3rd round (71st overall) of the 2002 NHL entry draft.

== Amateur career ==
Lee played major junior hockey with the Erie Otters in the Ontario Hockey League where, from 2000–01 to 2004–05, he played 319 games and collected 25 goals and 82 assists for 107 points, and earned 492 minutes in penalties.

== Awards and honors ==
Award	Year
EIHL Champion with Coventry Blaze	2009–10

== Career statistics ==
			Regular season					Playoffs
Season	Team	League	GP	G	A	Pts	PIM	GP	G	A	Pts	PIM
2000–01	Erie Otters	OHL	50	0	3	3	35	9	0	0	0	4
2001–02	Erie Otters	OHL	66	5	14	19	115	21	1	6	7	41
2002–03	Erie Otters	OHL	68	4	7	11	148	—	—	—	—	—
2002–03	Cincinnati Mighty Ducks	AHL	9	1	0	1	4	—	—	—	—	—
2003–04	Erie Otters	OHL	68	8	32	40	105	9	2	3	5	10
2004–05	Erie Otters	OHL	67	8	26	34	89	6	1	4	5	18
2004–05	Greenville Grrrowl	ECHL	2	0	0	0	2	7	2	3	5	6
2005–06	Norfolk Admirals	AHL	47	1	6	7	103	—	—	—	—	—
2006–07	Gwinnett Gladiators	ECHL	55	1	7	8	78	—	—	—	—	—
2006–07	Chicago Wolves	AHL	4	0	0	0	6	—	—	—	—	—
2006–07	Stockton Thunder	ECHL	16	2	6	8	33	6	0	0	0	10
2007–08	Stockton Thunder	ECHL	72	10	24	34	81	5	0	0	0	4
2008–09	Diables Rouges de Briançon	FRA	26	4	14	18	64	12	0	2	2	38
2009–10	Coventry Blaze	EIHL	56	8	27	35	94	3	0	2	2	6
2010–11	Coventry Blaze	EIHL	34	3	13	16	73	2	0	0	0	4
2011–12	WSV Sterzing Broncos	ITA	22	3	5	8	34	—	—	—	—	—
AHL totals			60	2	6	8	113	—	—	—	—	—
ECHL totals			145	13	37	50	194	18	2	3	5	20
