= Patrick O'Sullivan =

American ice hockey player

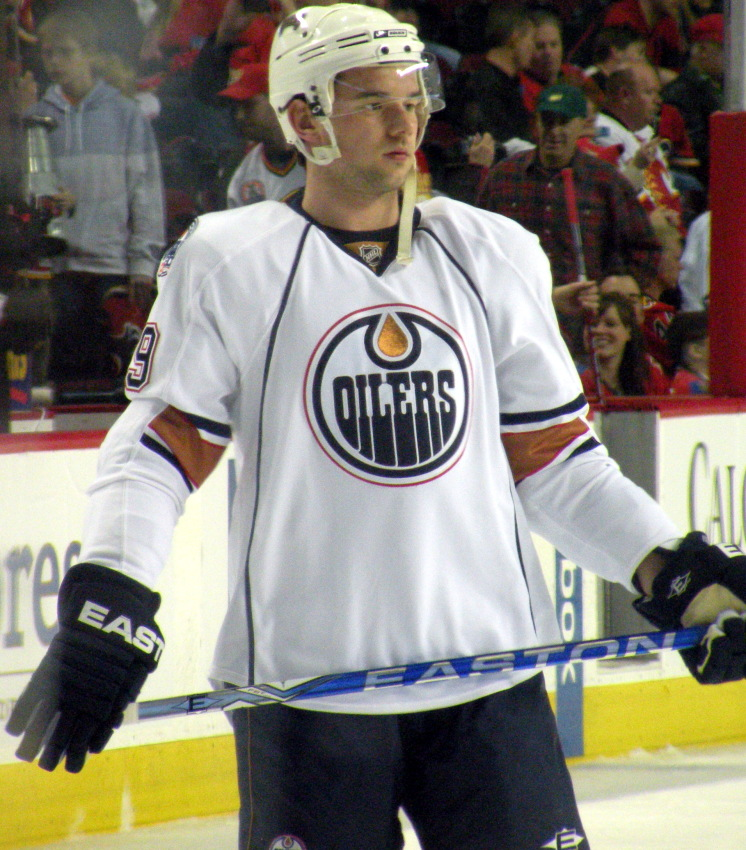
- O'Sullivan with the Edmonton Oilers in 2009
- Born: February 1, 1985 (age 41) Toronto, Ontario, Canada
- Height: 5 ft 11 in (180 cm)
- Weight: 190 lb (86 kg; 13 st 8 lb)
- Position: Centre
- Shot: Left
- Played for: Los Angeles Kings; Edmonton Oilers; Carolina Hurricanes; Minnesota Wild; Phoenix Coyotes; HIFK
- National team: United States
- NHL draft: 56th overall, 2003; Minnesota Wild
- Playing career: 2005–2012

Patrick O'Sullivan (born February 1, 1985) is a Canadian-American former professional ice hockey forward who played in the National Hockey League (NHL) for the Los Angeles Kings, Edmonton Oilers, Carolina Hurricanes, Minnesota Wild, and Phoenix Coyotes.

== Early life ==
O'Sullivan was born in Toronto, Ontario, but grew up in Winston-Salem, North Carolina. His father, John O'Sullivan, a Toronto native, played for the minor-league Winston-Salem Thunderbirds of the Atlantic Coast Hockey League.

O'Sullivan has spoken openly about being emotionally and physically abused for years by his father, as young as age 5, sometimes for no reason at all. The abuse continued up to the time he started playing for the Mississauga Ice Dogs of the Ontario Hockey League (OHL). Some notable acts were mainly verbal and physical abuse when Patrick had an off-game. O'Sullivan's father whipped him with a heavy leather jump rope and sometimes an electrical cord, as well as kicking, punching, and choking him, and burning cigarettes on him. There were also reports of John threatening and intimidating him. O'Sullivan was also sometimes locked out of the house in his pajamas during winter. The abuse escalated at an OHL game where John was screaming, cursing and pounding on the glass. It was also reported that when Patrick had an off-game, his father would physically abuse him in the parking lot afterwards. The abuse reached a point where Patrick began to suffer from post-traumatic stress disorder and pressed charges against his father and filed a restraining order against him. O'Sullivan later detailed the abuse in a book, Breaking Away: A Harrowing True Story of Resilience, Courage and Triumph.

== Playing career ==
=== Amateur ===
Despite the abuse, O'Sullivan was a junior hockey league star, winning the OHL and Canadian Hockey League (CHL) rookie of the year awards in 2002 and setting records for games, goals, assists and points for the Mississauga/Niagara IceDogs that, as of 2015, were still unbroken.

=== Professional ===
O'Sullivan was drafted in the second round, 56th overall, in the 2003 NHL entry draft by the Minnesota Wild after having been projected as a top-five talent. He played his first season for their American Hockey League (AHL) affiliate, the Houston Aeros, during the 2005–06 season. He had a strong season, scoring 47 goals and 93 points to break all Houston Aeros' rookie scoring records.

During the 2006 NHL entry draft, O'Sullivan was traded (along with their 17th overall pick, eventually used to select Trevor Lewis) to the Los Angeles Kings in exchange for Pavol Demitra.

O'Sullivan began the 2006–07 season with the Kings when he made his NHL debut on October 6, 2006, to become the first person from North Carolina to play in the NHL. He became the second NHL player, behind Jeff Halpern, to have been raised in the American South. O'Sullivan, along with Halpern, Jamie Fritsch, Jared Ross, Blake Geoffrion and Jarred Tinordi, are the only NHL players to date to come from the region. On November 2, 2006, O'Sullivan was assigned to the Kings' AHL affiliate at the time, the Manchester Monarchs. On January 25, 2007, he was recalled to the NHL.

On March 4, 2009, O'Sullivan (along with the Calgary Flames' second-round draft pick) was traded to the Carolina Hurricanes in exchange for Justin Williams, following which he was immediately traded (along with a second-round pick) to the Edmonton Oilers in exchange for Erik Cole and a fifth-round pick. He would play 19 games for the Oilers during the remainder of the season, scoring two goals and four assists.

On June 29, 2010, O'Sullivan (along with Ethan Moreau and Robert Nilsson) was placed on waivers by Edmonton. After clearing waivers the following day, on June 30, he was traded to the Phoenix Coyotes in exchange for Jim Vandermeer. His contract was then immediately bought-out by the Coyotes, resulting in his free agency. On September 17, 2010, O'Sullivan signed a two-way contract with the Carolina Hurricanes to become the first native of North Carolina to play for the Hurricanes. After being a healthy scratch ten times, O'Sullivan was placed on waivers by the Hurricanes and acquired by the Minnesota Wild.

On August 4, 2011, O'Sullivan signed a one-year, two-way contract with Phoenix. Unable to earn a regular position, scoring 4 points in 23 games to begin the 2011–12 season, O'Sullivan was reassigned to the Coyotes' AHL affiliate, the Portland Pirates. On March 2, 2012, the Coyotes loaned O'Sullivan to the Peoria Rivermen of the AHL in exchange for Brett Sterling.

On September 26, 2012, O'Sullivan signed his first European contract, agreeing to a one-year deal with HIFK of the Finnish SM-liiga. He scored one goal in eight games for HIFK before he was released one month into the 2012–13 season.

== Records ==
- Edmonton Oilers franchise record for worst +/- regular season (2009–10) minus 35
- Mississauga IceDogs franchise record for most regular season assists: (2004–05) – 59
- Mississauga IceDogs franchise record for most regular season points: (2001–02) – 92
- Houston Aeros franchise record for most regular season goals by a rookie: (2005–06) – 47
- Houston Aeros franchise single season record for most goals: (2005–06) – 47
- Houston Aeros franchise record for most regular season assists by a rookie: (2005–06) – 46
- Houston Aeros franchise record for most regular season points by a rookie: (2005–06) – 93

== Career statistics ==
=== Regular season and playoffs ===
			Regular season					Playoffs
Season	Team	League	GP	G	A	Pts	PIM	GP	G	A	Pts	PIM
1999–2000	Strathroy Rockets	GOJHL	54	25	30	55	44	—	—	—	—	—
2000–01	U.S. NTDP U18	NAHL	56	22	35	57	57	—	—	—	—	—
2000–01	U.S. NTDP U17	USDP	8	8	10	18	12	—	—	—	—	—
2001–02	Mississauga IceDogs	OHL	68	34	58	92	61	—	—	—	—	—
2001–02	U.S. NTDP Juniors	USHL	1	1	0	1	2	—	—	—	—	—
2002–03	Mississauga IceDogs	OHL	56	40	41	81	57	5	2	9	11	18
2003–04	Mississauga IceDogs	OHL	53	43	39	82	32	24	12	11	23	16
2004–05	Mississauga IceDogs	OHL	57	31	59	90	63	5	0	4	4	6
2005–06	Houston Aeros	AHL	78	47	46	93	64	8	5	5	10	4
2006–07	Manchester Monarchs	AHL	41	18	21	39	12	16	8	9	17	10
2006–07	Los Angeles Kings	NHL	44	5	14	19	14	—	—	—	—	—
2007–08	Los Angeles Kings	NHL	82	22	31	53	36	—	—	—	—	—
2008–09	Los Angeles Kings	NHL	62	14	23	37	16	—	—	—	—	—
2008–09	Edmonton Oilers	NHL	19	2	4	6	12	—	—	—	—	—
2009–10	Edmonton Oilers	NHL	73	11	23	34	32	—	—	—	—	—
2010–11	Carolina Hurricanes	NHL	10	1	0	1	2	—	—	—	—	—
2010–11	Minnesota Wild	NHL	21	1	6	7	2	—	—	—	—	—
2010–11	Houston Aeros	AHL	36	19	29	48	22	24	4	14	18	16
2011–12	Phoenix Coyotes	NHL	23	2	2	4	2	—	—	—	—	—
2011–12	Portland Pirates	AHL	26	10	20	30	16	—	—	—	—	—
2011–12	Peoria Rivermen	AHL	17	5	8	13	36	—	—	—	—	—
2012–13	HIFK	SM-l	8	1	3	4	4	—	—	—	—	—
NHL totals			334	58	103	161	116	—	—	—	—	—

=== International ===
Medal record

Men's ice hockey

Representing United States

World Junior Championships
Gold medal – first place	2004 Helsinki	

IIHF U18 Championships
Gold medal – first place	2002 Piešťany	

Year	Team	Event	Result	GP	G	A	Pts	PIM
2002	United States	WJC18	1st place, gold medalist(s)	8	7	8	15	37
2003	United States	WJC	4th	7	1	2	3	10
2004	United States	WJC	1st place, gold medalist(s)	6	3	0	3	12
2005	United States	WJC	4th	7	2	6	8	14
2006	United States	WC	7th	3	1	0	1	0
2008	United States	WC	6th	7	3	3	6	2
2009	United States	WC	4th	9	4	3	7	6
Junior totals				28	13	16	29	73
Senior totals				19	8	6	14	8

== Awards and honours ==
Award	Year
OHL
Jack Ferguson Award	2001
Emms Family Award	2002
CHL Rookie of the Year	2002
AHL
All-Star Game	2006, 2007*
All-Rookie Team	2006
Dudley "Red" Garrett Memorial Award	2006
