= Nathan Robinson (ice hockey) =

Canadian ice hockey player

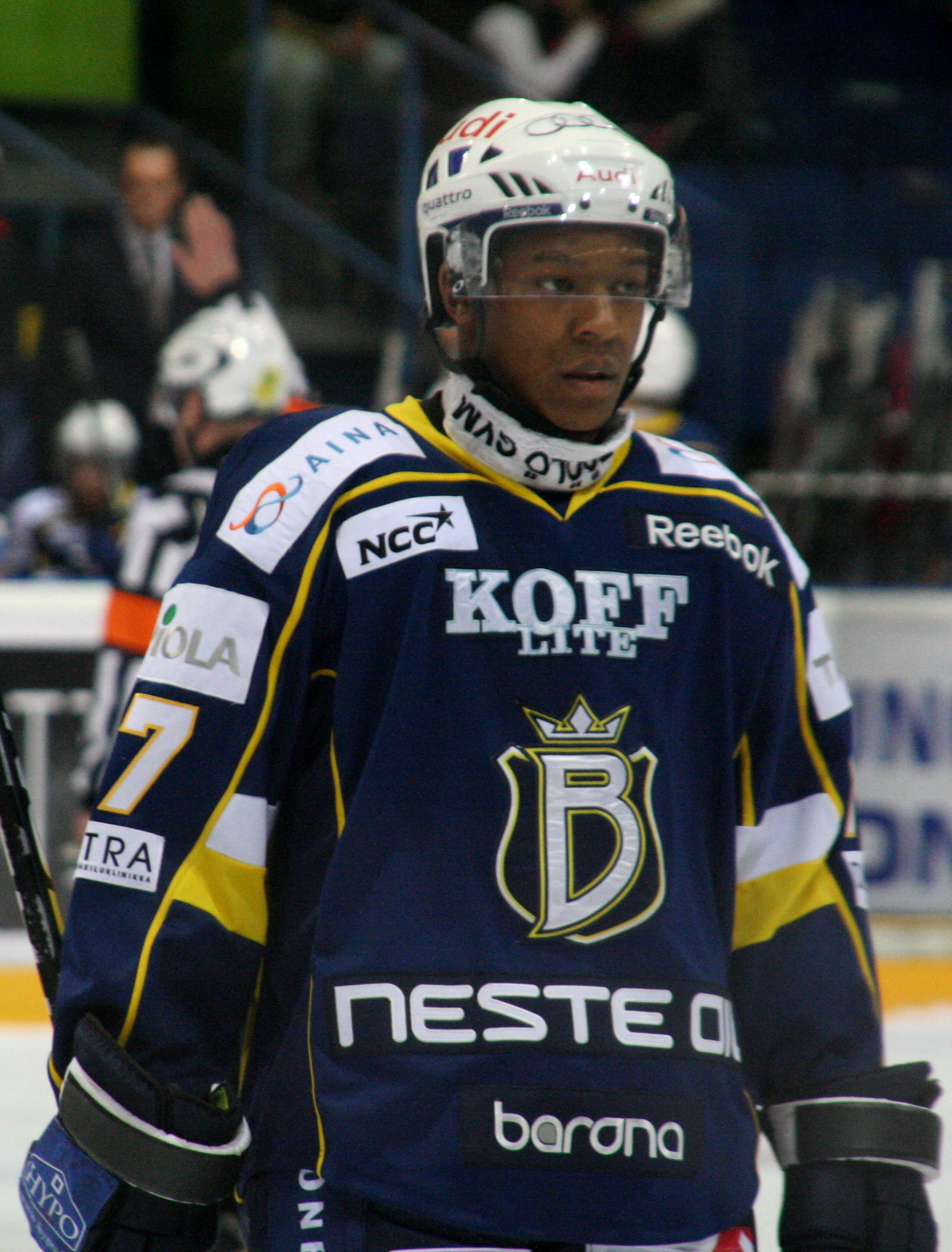
- Robinson with the Espoo Blues during the 2010-11 season.
- Born: 31 December 1981 (age 44) Amherstview, Ontario, Canada
- Height: 5 ft 9 in (175 cm)
- Weight: 181 lb (82 kg; 12 st 13 lb)
- Position: Left wing
- Shot: Left
- Played for: Detroit Red Wings; Boston Bruins; Adler Mannheim; Eisbären Berlin; Espoo Blues; Vienna Capitals; Kölner Haie; Nottingham Panthers; Belfast Giants
- NHL draft: Undrafted
- Playing career: 2002–2020

Nathan Robinson (born 31 December 1981) is a Canadian former ice hockey forward. He played 7 games in the National Hockey League with the Detroit Red Wings and Boston Bruins between 2003 and 2006. The rest of his career, which lasted from 2002 to 2020, was primarily spent in Europe.

== Playing career ==
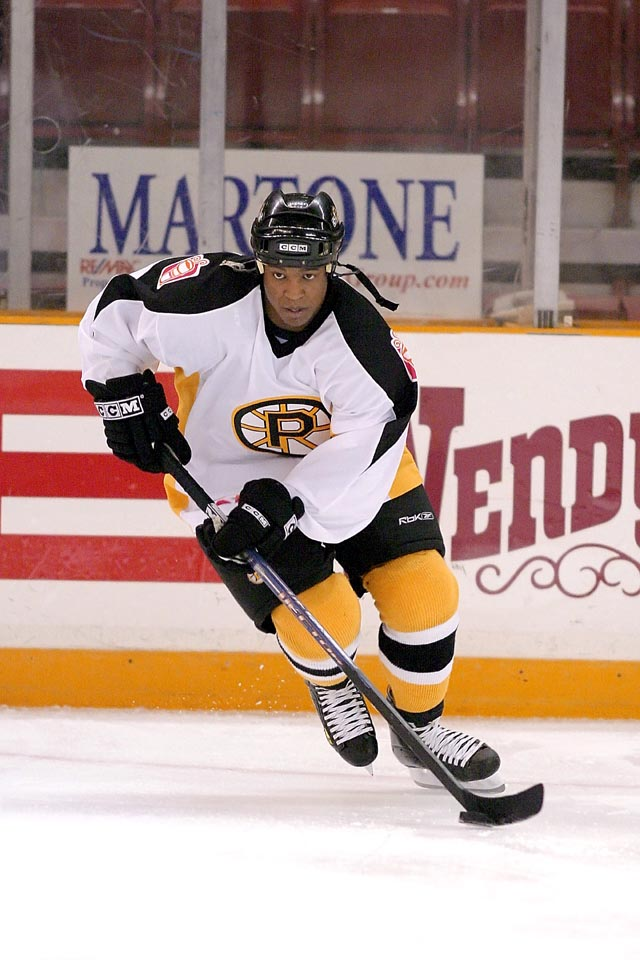
Robinson with the Providence Bruins in 2005

Robinson played major junior hockey with the Belleville Bulls of the Ontario Hockey League, where he won the OHL scoring title in the 2001-02 season. He was passed over in the NHL entry draft but signed with the Detroit Red Wings as a free agent on 15 October 2002. He made his NHL debut with the Red Wings during the 2003–04 NHL season, playing five games in all, going scoreless. After three years within the Red Wings organization on 15 August 2005, he signed with the Boston Bruins and over the course of the 2005–06 season played two more games in the NHL but again went pointless receiving very little playing time to prove his potential.

In 2006, he left for Europe signing with Adler Mannheim in Germany and then moved to Eisbären Berlin the next season becoming an elite player in the Deutsche Eishockey Liga. Prior to the 2009–10 season he signed a two-year contract to return with Adler Mannheim. In his first season in his return to Mannheim, Robinson helped the Eagles become DEL Champions, marking his third successive DEL Championship.

During the 2010–11 season, in his final year of his deal with Mannheim, Robinson struggled to maintain his previous form and was subsequently released to join eventual silver medalists Espoo Blues of the Finnish SM-liiga, for the remainder of the season finishing on 27 January 2011. In September 2011, he signed a contract with the Vienna Capitals of the Austrian Hockey League.

On 5 September 2012, he signed a one-year contract as a free agent in Germany with the Kölner Haie of the DEL.

On 28 July 2014, Robinson was announced as signing a short term deal with the Nottingham Panthers of the UK's EIHL who, for the first time in their history, are to compete in the Champions Hockey League in 2014/15. He had to leave the club in November 2014 as his work permit expired. Robinson then signed with the Belfast Giants of the EIHL.

Following the 2014-15 season, Robinson signed with HC Slavia Praha of the 1st Czech Republic Hockey League, a second level ice hockey league in the Czech Republic. For the 2016-17 season, Robinson signed with Shakhtyor Soligorsk of the Belarusian Extraliga, and later signed with EHC Bayreuth in the DEL2. Despite originally signing with HC 07 Detva in the Slovak Extraliga, Robinson switched to the Saale Bulls Halle in the German league Oberliga for the 2017-18 season after playing 4 games.

== Career statistics ==
=== Regular season and playoffs ===
			Regular season					Playoffs
Season	Team	League	GP	G	A	Pts	PIM	GP	G	A	Pts	PIM
1997–98	Kingston Voyageurs	OPJHL	46	14	25	39	55	—	—	—	—	—
1998–99	Belleville Bulls	OHL	50	11	8	19	23	21	4	4	8	14
1998–99	Belleville Bulls	M-Cup	—	—	—	—	—	4	0	0	0	0
1999–00	Belleville Bulls	OHL	61	19	18	37	45	15	3	4	7	10
2000–01	Belleville Bulls	OHL	66	32	37	69	57	10	6	10	16	7
2001–02	Belleville Bulls	OHL	67	47	63	110	74	11	8	6	14	10
2002–03	Toledo Storm	ECHL	9	5	9	14	29	—	—	—	—	—
2002–03	Grand Rapids Griffins	AHL	53	3	14	17	24	8	0	3	3	0
2003–04	Grand Rapids Griffins	AHL	69	24	26	50	41	3	0	0	0	2
2003–04	Detroit Red Wings	NHL	5	0	0	0	2	—	—	—	—	—
2004–05	Grand Rapids Griffins	AHL	50	8	16	24	10	—	—	—	—	—
2004–05	Syracuse Crunch	AHL	19	6	14	20	18	—	—	—	—	—
2005–06	Providence Bruins	AHL	70	29	31	60	55	6	4	5	9	2
2005–06	Boston Bruins	NHL	2	0	0	0	0	—	—	—	—	—
2006–07	Adler Mannheim	DEL	50	15	29	44	34	11	4	7	11	26
2007–08	Eisbären Berlin	DEL	56	14	40	54	62	13	4	11	15	29
2008–09	Eisbären Berlin	DEL	48	14	37	51	92	12	5	7	12	24
2009–10	Adler Mannheim	DEL	54	10	32	42	50	2	0	1	1	0
2010–11	Adler Mannheim	DEL	32	6	6	12	28	—	—	—	—	—
2010–11	Blues	SM-l	14	4	5	9	2	5	1	2	3	8
2011–12	Vienna Capitals	EBEL	41	5	19	24	42	7	1	4	5	11
2012–13	Kölner Haie	DEL	52	10	22	32	62	12	5	4	9	6
2013–14	Kölner Haie	DEL	39	4	13	17	32	—	—	—	—	—
2014–15	Nottingham Panthers	EIHL	13	3	11	14	11	—	—	—	—	—
2014–15	Belfast Giants	EIHL	10	3	3	6	4	4	3	3	6	10
2015–16	HC Slavia Praha	CZE-2	51	16	30	46	56	8	1	5	6	10
2016–17	Shakhtyor Soligorsk	BLR	17	6	9	15	21	—	—	—	—	—
2016–17	EHC Bayreuth	DEL2	12	5	6	11	2	7	0	2	2	6
2017–18	HC 07 Detva	SVK	4	0	2	2	2	—	—	—	—	—
2017–18	Saale Bulls Halle	GER-3	26	16	16	32	31	3	0	2	2	4
2018–19	Saale Bulls Halle	GER-3	21	10	13	23	37	—	—	—	—	—
2019–20	EC Harzer Falken	GER-4	6	1	6	7	2	5	5	10	15	4
DEL totals			331	73	179	252	360	50	18	30	48	85
NHL totals			7	0	0	0	2	—	—	—	—	—

== See also ==
- List of black NHL players
