= Semans, Saskatchewan =

Village in Saskatchewan, Canada

Semans
- Village
- Location within Saskatchewan Location within Canada
- Coordinates: 51.24°N 104.24°W
- Country: Canada
- Province: Saskatchewan
- Census division: 10
- Rural Municipality: Mount Hope No. 279
- Post office Founded: 1908-10-12
- Incorporated (Village): December 14, 1908

Government
  - Mayor: Bradlee Cox
  - Administrator: Teresa Marshall
  - Governing body: Semans Village Council

Area
  - Total: 1.14 km^{2} (0.44 sq mi)
- Elevation: 558 m (1,831 ft)

Population (2011)
  - Total: 204
  - Density: 178.3/km^{2} (462/sq mi)
- Time zone: UTC-6 (CST)
- Postal code: S0A 3S0
- Area code: 306
- Highways: Highway 15
- Website: Official Website Semans, Saskatchewan

Semans (2016 population: 196) is a village in the Canadian province of Saskatchewan within the Rural Municipality of Mount Hope No. 279 and Census Division No. 10. The village is located approximately 125 kilometres (78 mi) north of the city of Regina and 195 kilometres (121 mi) southeast of the city of Saskatoon.

== History ==
Settlers first homesteaded in the Semans area as early as 1904. Semans, named for the wife of a railroad official, was one in the alphabetical sequence of towns on the Grand Trunk Railway line between Winnipeg, Manitoba and Saskatoon, Saskatchewan. A picture of the first station shows the spelling as "Semons". The first sports day was held on July 1, 1908. The railroad station and first grain elevator were built by the fall of 1908. In a little more than a year, local businesses could supply almost all necessary commodities and the population was 48 people. The first open air ice rink was in use by 1907. On October 28, 1908, the Semans Board of Trade sent correspondence regarding the organization of Semans under the Village Act of 1908. A petition was sent on November 4, 1908, signed by the businesses. Semans incorporated as a village on December 14, 1908.

Semans celebrated 100 years as a village with a centennial anniversary homecoming in July 2008.

== Demographics ==
Population history (1981–2016)
Year	Pop.	±%
1981	344	—
1986	356	+3.5%
1991	333	−6.5%
1996	315	−5.4%
2001	267	−15.2%
2006	195	−27.0%
2011	204	+4.6%
2016	196	−3.9%
Source: Statistics Canada via Saskatchewan Bureau of Statistics

In the 2021 Census of Population conducted by Statistics Canada, Semans had a population of 180 living in 93 of its 113 total private dwellings, a change of −8.2% from its 2016 population of 196. With a land area of 1.08 km^{2} (0.42 sq mi), it had a population density of 166.7/km^{2} (431.7/sq mi) in 2021.

In the 2016 Census of Population, the Village of Semans recorded a population of 196 living in 103 of its 137 total private dwellings, a −4.1% change from its 2011 population of 204. With a land area of 1.14 km^{2} (0.44 sq mi), it had a population density of 171.9/km^{2} (445.3/sq mi) in 2016.

== Climate ==
Climate data for Semans
Month	Jan	Feb	Mar	Apr	May	Jun	Jul	Aug	Sep	Oct	Nov	Dec	Year
Record high °C (°F)	7 (45)	12.8 (55.0)	20.5 (68.9)	32.8 (91.0)	37.8 (100.0)	40 (104)	42.2 (108.0)	41.1 (106.0)	35.6 (96.1)	31.7 (89.1)	21.1 (70.0)	13.3 (55.9)	42.2 (108.0)
Mean daily maximum °C (°F)	−11.5 (11.3)	−8.5 (16.7)	−0.9 (30.4)	10.4 (50.7)	18.5 (65.3)	22.7 (72.9)	24.8 (76.6)	24.3 (75.7)	17.5 (63.5)	10.5 (50.9)	−1.8 (28.8)	−9.7 (14.5)	8 (46)
Daily mean °C (°F)	−16.8 (1.8)	−13.7 (7.3)	−5.8 (21.6)	4.4 (39.9)	11.8 (53.2)	16.2 (61.2)	18.2 (64.8)	17.4 (63.3)	11.1 (52.0)	4.5 (40.1)	−6.3 (20.7)	−14.6 (5.7)	2.2 (36.0)
Mean daily minimum °C (°F)	−22.1 (−7.8)	−18.8 (−1.8)	−10.6 (12.9)	−1.7 (28.9)	5 (41)	9.7 (49.5)	11.5 (52.7)	10.5 (50.9)	4.6 (40.3)	−1.6 (29.1)	−10.7 (12.7)	−19.5 (−3.1)	−3.6 (25.5)
Record low °C (°F)	−44.4 (−47.9)	−45 (−49)	−38.9 (−38.0)	−28.9 (−20.0)	−12.2 (10.0)	−5 (23)	−1.1 (30.0)	−5 (23)	−13.9 (7.0)	−23.5 (−10.3)	−33.5 (−28.3)	−43.5 (−46.3)	−45 (−49)
Average precipitation mm (inches)	20.6 (0.81)	15.1 (0.59)	17.3 (0.68)	21.2 (0.83)	46.7 (1.84)	67.8 (2.67)	74.3 (2.93)	45.4 (1.79)	35.5 (1.40)	22.2 (0.87)	19 (0.7)	26.2 (1.03)	411.3 (16.19)
Source: Environment Canada

== Notable people ==
- Sherwood Bassin, hockey executive in Ontario Hockey League and the Canadian National junior team
- Gordon MacMurchy, MLA for Last Mountain and Member of the Saskatchewan Order of Merit
- George Hara Williams, politician and Saskatchewan Minister of Agriculture (1944–1945)

== See also ==
- List of communities in Saskatchewan
- List of villages in Saskatchewan
