= OHL Executive of the Year =

- Sport: Ice hockey
- Awarded for: Top executive in OHL

History
- First award: 1990
- Final award: 2013

The OHL Executive of the Year Award was given annually to the top executive in the Ontario Hockey League, whose team demonstrates success both on the ice, and at the administration level. It was first awarded in 1989–90 OHL season, and last presented in the 2012–13 OHL season. The last winner, Mike Vellucci, is the only person in OHL history to be named both executive and coach of the year in the same season.

== List of OHL Executives of the Year ==
Season	Executive	Team
1989–90	Sam McMaster	Sudbury Wolves
1990–91	Sherwood Bassin	Sault Ste. Marie Greyhounds
1991–92	Bert Templeton	North Bay Centennials
1992–93	Jim Rutherford	Detroit Junior Red Wings
1993–94	Jim Rutherford	Detroit Junior Red Wings
1994–95	Mike Kelly	Guelph Storm
1995–96	Bert Templeton	Barrie Colts
1996–97	Ed Rowe	Peterborough Petes
1997–98	Paul McIntosh	London Knights
1998–99	Jeff Hunt	Ottawa 67's
1999–00	Robert Ciccarelli	Sarnia Sting
2000–01	Not awarded	
2001–02	Sherwood Bassin	Erie Otters
2002–03	Steve Bienkowski	Kitchener Rangers
2003–04	Mark Hunter	London Knights
2004–05	Mike Futa	Owen Sound Attack
2005–06	Craig Goslin	Saginaw Spirit
2006–07	Craig Goslin	Saginaw Spirit
2007–08	Denise Burke	Niagara IceDogs
2008–09	Warren Rychel	Windsor Spitfires
2009–10	Rick Gaetz	Guelph Storm
2010–11	Dale DeGray	Owen Sound Attack
2011–12	Steve Bienkowski	Kitchener Rangers
2012–13	Mike Vellucci	Plymouth Whalers

== See also ==
- John Horman Trophy – Quebec Major Junior Hockey League Executive of the Year
- Lloyd Saunders Memorial Trophy – Western Hockey League Executive of the Year
- List of Canadian Hockey League awards
