= Gouin (surname) =

Gouin or Goüin is a French surname. The surname originates in the province of Brittany; in the Breton Celtic language, pre French or Gallic conquest of the Brittany celts, "gouin" or "gwin" means "white". Thus, it is a cognate of the Welsh surname Gwyn/Gwinn/Quinn which has the same meaning. It is widespread both in France and Canada (especially in Quebec). The diaresis appears to be an archaism, and is never, or very seldom, used by any of the current living holders of the name. Notable people with the surname include:

- Alexandre Goüin (1792–1872), French banker and politician
- Antoine-Némèse Gouin (1821–1899), lawyer and politician
- Ernest Goüin (1815–1885), French engineer
- Eugène Goüin (1818–1909, French banker and politician
- Félix Gouin (1884–1977), French politician
- Jean Ivan Gouin (1916–2007), Canadian businessman
- Laure Mathilde Gouin (1829-1916), French painter and photographer, also known as Mme. M. Gouin.
- Léon Mercier Gouin (1891–1983), Quebec lawyer and politician
- Louis Gouin (1756–1814), Canadian politician
- Lomer Gouin (1861–1929), Quebec politician, former Premier
- Paul Gouin (1898–1976), Quebec politician
