= Dale DeGray =

Canadian ice hockey player

- Born: September 3, 1963 (age 62) Oshawa, Ontario, Canada
- Height: 6 ft 0 in (183 cm)
- Weight: 206 lb (93 kg; 14 st 10 lb)
- Position: Defence
- Shot: Right
- Played for: Calgary Flames; Toronto Maple Leafs; Los Angeles Kings; Buffalo Sabres; HC Alleghe
- National team: Canada
- NHL draft: 162nd overall, 1981; Calgary Flames
- Playing career: 1983–1989

Medal record

Men's ice hockey

Representing Canada

World Championships
Bronze medal – third place	1995 Sweden	Ice hockey

Dale "Digger" DeGray (born September 3, 1963) is a Canadian former ice hockey defenceman who played 153 games in the National Hockey League (NHL). He was an eighth round selection, 182nd overall, of the Calgary Flames at the 1981 NHL entry draft and played for the Toronto Maple Leafs, Los Angeles Kings and Buffalo Sabres in addition to the Flames before settling into a long minor league career. Internationally, DeGray represented Canada on one occasion; he was a member of the bronze medal-winning team at the 1995 World Championship. DeGray is currently the general manager of the Niagara IceDogs of the Ontario Hockey League (OHL) and was named the OHL Executive of the Year in 2010–11.

== Playing career ==
The grandson of Canadian Lacrosse Hall of Famer Kelly DeGray, Dale played both hockey and lacrosse in his youth but turned his focus exclusively to hockey in his teens. He played three seasons of junior hockey for the Oshawa Generals of the Ontario Hockey League (OHL) between 1980 and 1983 where he established a reputation as a rugged defenceman. DeGray scored 50 points in his third season, 1982–83, and added 14 more in the playoffs as the Generals won the J. Ross Robertson Cup as OHL champions.

The Calgary Flames selected him in the eighth round, 182nd overall at the 1981 NHL entry draft, and he began his professional career in 1983–84 with a 30-point season for the Colorado Flames of the Central Hockey League (CHL). He then spent the majority of three seasons in the American Hockey League (AHL) with the Moncton Golden Flames. He was named to the AHL second All-Star Team in 1984–85, and served as captain of the Golden Flames in 1985–86. DeGray appeared in one NHL game that season, making his NHL debut with Calgary on March 6, 1986, against the New York Rangers. He played a part-time role in Calgary in 1986–87; in 27 games with the Flames, DeGray scored six goals and seven assists.

Unable to land a consistent place with Calgary, the Flames traded DeGray to the Toronto Maple Leafs on September 17, 1987, in exchange for a fifth-round draft pick. He spent the majority of the 1987–88 NHL season in Toronto where he had 24 points in 56 games and spent some time playing at forward. DeGray played only the one season in Toronto as he was claimed in the 1988 NHL Waiver Draft by the Los Angeles Kings. He played a career-high 63 games for the Kings in 1988–89 and posted 28 points with 97 penalties in minutes. After beginning the 1989–90 season with the AHL's New Haven Nighthawks, the Kings traded DeGray on November 24, 1989, to the Buffalo Sabres in exchange for Bob Halkidis. The six games he played in Buffalo were the last of his NHL career.

DeGray played most of two seasons with the AHL's Rochester Americans before spending the 1991–92 season in Italy with HC Alleghe. He returned to North America and played several seasons in the International Hockey League (IHL) for seven teams. He was named to the IHL second All-Star Team on two occasions: 1992–93 with the San Diego Gulls and 1994–95, split between the Detroit Vipers and Cleveland Lumberjacks. In 1995, he also made his lone appearance with the Canadian national team. DeGray scored one goal and one assist in six games for the bronze medal-winning Canadians at the 1995 World Championship. DeGray's final season was 1998–99 when, as a member of the Indianapolis Ice, he suffered a career-ending shoulder injury in a December 10, 1998, game against the Orlando Solar Bears.

== Coaching and management career ==
DeGray briefly turned to coaching, where he spent two seasons as the head coach of the United Hockey League's Rockford IceHogs between 1999 and 2001. He led the team to a combined 62–72–14 record in that time. Since 2007, he has been the general manager of the OHL's Owen Sound Attack. DeGray was named the OHL's Executive of the Year in 2010–11 after guiding the Attack to a franchise-best 46–17–5 record, a J. Ross Robertson Cup championship and a place in the 2011 Memorial Cup tournament.

== Career statistics ==
=== Regular season and playoffs ===
			Regular season					Playoffs
Season	Team	League	GP	G	A	Pts	PIM	GP	G	A	Pts	PIM
1979–80	Oshawa Legionnaires	MetJBHL	43	14	14	28	34	—	—	—	—	—
1979–80	Oshawa Generals	OMJHL	1	0	0	0	2	—	—	—	—	—
1980–81	Oshawa Generals	OHL	61	11	10	21	93	—	—	—	—	—
1981–82	Oshawa Generals	OHL	66	11	22	33	162	12	3	4	7	49
1982–83	Oshawa Generals	OHL	69	20	30	50	149	17	7	7	14	36
1983–84	Colorado Flames	CHL	67	16	14	30	67	6	1	1	2	2
1984–85	Moncton Golden Flames	AHL	77	24	37	61	63	—	—	—	—	—
1985–86	Calgary Flames	NHL	1	0	0	0	0	—	—	—	—	—
1985–86	Moncton Golden Flames	AHL	76	10	31	41	128	6	0	1	1	0
1986–87	Calgary Flames	NHL	27	6	7	13	29	—	—	—	—	—
1986–87	Moncton Golden Flames	AHL	45	10	22	32	57	5	2	1	3	19
1987–88	Toronto Maple Leafs	NHL	56	6	18	24	63	5	0	1	1	16
1987–88	Newmarket Saints	AHL	8	2	10	12	8	—	—	—	—	—
1988–89	Los Angeles Kings	NHL	63	6	22	28	97	8	1	2	3	12
1989–90	Buffalo Sabres	NHL	6	0	0	0	6	—	—	—	—	—
1989–90	New Haven Nighthawks	AHL	16	2	10	12	38	—	—	—	—	—
1989–90	Rochester Americans	AHL	50	6	25	31	118	17	5	6	11	59
1990–91	Rochester Americans	AHL	64	9	25	34	121	15	3	4	7	76
1991–92	HC Alleghe	ALP	18	10	12	22	74	—	—	—	—	—
1991–92	HC Alleghe	ITA	18	6	16	22	36	9	0	6	6	10
1992–93	San Diego Gulls	IHL	79	18	64	82	181	14	3	11	14	77
1993–94	San Diego Gulls	IHL	80	20	50	70	163	9	2	1	3	8
1994–95	Detroit Vipers	IHL	14	1	8	9	18	—	—	—	—	—
1994–95	Cleveland Lumberjacks	IHL	64	19	49	68	134	4	0	4	4	10
1995–96	Cincinnati Cyclones	IHL	79	13	46	59	96	16	1	6	7	35
1996–97	Cincinnati Cyclones	IHL	30	5	16	21	55	—	—	—	—	—
1996–97	Manitoba Moose	IHL	44	9	15	24	42	—	—	—	—	—
1997–98	Manitoba Moose	IHL	15	0	7	7	16	—	—	—	—	—
1997–98	Quebec Rafales	IHL	31	4	9	13	27	—	—	—	—	—
1997–98	Cleveland Lumberjacks	IHL	11	1	9	10	4	9	3	7	10	8
1998–99	Indianapolis Ice	IHL	27	3	11	14	18	—	—	—	—	—
NHL totals			153	18	47	65	195	13	1	3	4	28

=== International ===
Year	Team	Event	GP	G	A	Pts	PIM
1995	Canada	WC	6	1	1	2	6
Senior totals			6	1	1	2	6
