= Rick Lanz =

Czech-born Canadian ice hockey player

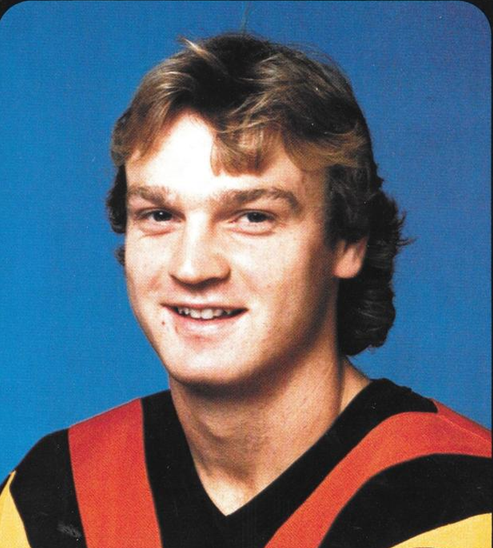
- Born: September 16, 1961 (age 65) Karlovy Vary, Czechoslovakia
- Height: 6 ft 2 in (188 cm)
- Weight: 203 lb (92 kg; 14 st 7 lb)
- Position: Defence
- Shot: Right
- Played for: Vancouver Canucks; Toronto Maple Leafs; Chicago Blackhawks
- National team: Canada
- NHL draft: 7th overall, 1980; Vancouver Canucks
- Playing career: 1980–1993
Medal record
Representing Canada
Ice hockey
World Championships
Bronze medal – third place	1983 West Germany

Richard Roman Lanz (born September 16, 1961) is a Czech-born Canadian former professional ice hockey defenceman who spent 10 seasons in the National Hockey League and is best known for his time with the Vancouver Canucks. He was born in Czechoslovakia, but his family defected to Canada following the invasion by the Soviet Union in 1968.

== Playing career ==
Lanz was selected 7th overall in the 1980 NHL entry draft by the Vancouver Canucks following an excellent junior career with the Oshawa Generals in which he was named the club's top defenceman in three consecutive seasons. He also received the opportunity to represent Canada at 1980 World Junior Championships.

He immediately broke into the Canucks roster in 1980–81 at the age of just 19 and had a fine rookie year, posting 29 points in 76 games. Unfortunately, the 1981–82 season would prove to be a setback, as he tore knee ligaments 39 games in, forcing him to miss the rest of the regular season and the entire playoffs. The situation would prove doubly disappointing as he was forced to miss the Canucks' surprising march to the Stanley Cup Finals that spring.

In 1982–83 Lanz returned to the ice and hit his stride as an NHL player, recording 10 goals and 48 points, good for 6th on the club. He was also selected to represent Canada at the 1983 World Championships, where he helped the team win a bronze medal. He would follow this up with his finest NHL season in 1983–84, as he posted 18 goals and 57 points (both narrowly missing club records for defencemen) and was named the team's top defenceman. He was especially effective on the power play, and his 14 power-play goals tied for the league lead among defencemen with Edmonton Oilers superstar Paul Coffey.

Lanz would suffer through a disaster 1984–85 season, as he was hobbled by a neck injury and limited to just 19 points. He would return to form the following year, though, posting 53 points to again lead Canuck defencemen. Midway through the 1986–87 season, Vancouver dealt him to the Toronto Maple Leafs for Jim Benning and Dan Hodgson. He finished the year with 28 points in 61 games and matched that total in 1987–88. He was still a useful contributor for the Leafs but was no longer the dangerous offensive player he had been in Vancouver. After a terrible 1988–89 season in which he was limited by injuries and benchings to just 32 games and 10 points, he was released by Toronto.

His departure from Toronto would essentially mark the end of his NHL career. Unable to find any interest in the NHL, he spent the 1989–90 season in Switzerland. He was signed to a contract by the Chicago Blackhawks in 1990, but would only play a single game for them during the 1991–92 season. Following brief stops in the minor-league systems of the Los Angeles Kings and Tampa Bay Lightning, he retired in 1993.

Lanz finished his career with totals of 65 goals and 221 assists for 286 points in 569 career games, along with 448 penalty minutes.

== Coaching career ==
Following his retirement, Lanz returned to British Columbia to accept a job in the BCHL as an assistant coach for the Penticton Panthers. He was named head coach of the Langley Thunder in 1995. He would later be united with his brother-in-law Mark Holick in South Surrey and found immediate success. He took a team with super-star Scott Gomez to the Royal Bank Cup in Summerside PEI but would lose in the final to a heartbreaking game. The next season Rick would move to the WHL in 1997–98 as an assistant coach for the Tri-City Americans, although he was promoted to the head coaching position only a few games into the season. He would return to Langley the following year and remain their head coach until 2003.

Lanz was hired as head coach of the Burnaby Express in 2004 and led the team to the Royal Bank Cup in 2006, where they were crowned Canadian Junior A Champions. He left Burnaby to sign on as head coach of the Victoria Grizzlies and after two months as head coach of the Victoria Grizzlies he was offered the head scouting job for western Canada and the US for the Colorado Avalanche. After a long tenure in Colorado he left to join the St. Louis Blues in 2018-2019 and helped the Blues win a Stanley Cup in 2019. He is currently coaching at Delta Hockey Academy and with the Delta Ice Hawks of the Pacific Junior Hockey League.

Some notable players that Rick has coached are Scott Gomez, Brad Hunt, Ivan Huml, Keith Seabrook, Raymond Sawada, Mark and Mike Santorelli, Kyle Turris, Ben Walter, and Milan Lucic.

== Career statistics ==
=== Regular season and playoffs ===
			Regular season					Playoffs
Season	Team	League	GP	G	A	Pts	PIM	GP	G	A	Pts	PIM
1976–77	Burlington Cougars	CJHL	45	10	25	35	28	—	—	—	—	—
1977–78	Oshawa Generals	OMJHL	65	1	41	42	51	6	0	2	2	4
1978–79	Oshawa Generals	OMJHL	66	11	48	59	88	5	1	3	4	14
1979–80	Oshawa Generals	OMJHL	52	18	38	56	51	7	2	3	5	6
1980–81	Vancouver Canucks	NHL	76	7	22	29	40	3	0	0	0	4
1981–82	Vancouver Canucks	NHL	39	3	11	14	48	—	—	—	—	—
1982–83	Vancouver Canucks	NHL	74	10	38	48	46	4	2	1	3	0
1983–84	Vancouver Canucks	NHL	79	18	39	57	45	4	0	4	4	2
1984–85	Vancouver Canucks	NHL	57	2	17	19	69	—	—	—	—	—
1985–86	Vancouver Canucks	NHL	75	15	38	53	73	3	0	0	0	0
1986–87	Vancouver Canucks	NHL	17	1	6	7	10	—	—	—	—	—
1986–87	Toronto Maple Leafs	NHL	44	2	19	21	32	13	1	3	4	27
1987–88	Toronto Maple Leafs	NHL	75	6	22	28	65	1	0	0	0	2
1988–89	Toronto Maple Leafs	NHL	32	1	9	10	18	—	—	—	—	—
1989–90	HC Ambrì–Piotta	NDA	28	4	14	18	61	2	0	0	0	6
1990–91	Indianapolis Ice	IHL	8	0	5	5	18	—	—	—	—	—
1991–92	Canada	Intl	4	0	1	1	2	—	—	—	—	—
1991–92	Chicago Blackhawks	NHL	1	0	0	0	2	—	—	—	—	—
1991–92	Phoenix Roadrunners	IHL	38	7	14	21	21	—	—	—	—	—
1992–93	Atlanta Knights	IHL	25	6	12	18	30	—	—	—	—	—
NHL totals			569	65	221	286	448	28	3	8	11	35

=== International ===
Year	Team	Event	GP	G	A	Pts	PIM
1980	Canada	WJC	5	0	1	1	6
1983	Canada	WC	6	0	2	2	2
Senior totals			6	0	2	2	2

=== Coaching ===
Season	Team	League	Position	Regular season					
Season	Team	League	Position	G	W	L	T	OTL	Pct
1996–97	South Surrey Eagles	BCHL	Head coach	60	47	7	6	0	.833
1997–98	Tri-City Americans	WHL	Head coach	72	17	49	6	0	.278
1998–99	Langley Hornets	BCHL	Head coach	60	20	38	0	2	.350
1999–00	Langley Hornets	BCHL	Head coach	60	41	17	0	2	.700
2000–01	Langley Hornets	BCHL	Head coach	60	29	25	0	6	.533
2003–04	Langley Hornets	BCHL	Head coach	60	19	36	1	4	.358
2005–06	Burnaby Express	BCHL	Head coach	60	34	20	1	5	.617
Totals				432	207	192	14	19	.517

Preceded by Rick Vaive	Vancouver Canucks first-round draft pick 1980	Succeeded by Garth Butcher
