= Paul McIntosh =

Canadian ice hockey player

- Born: March 13, 1953 (age 72); Listowel, Ontario, Canada
- Height: 5 ft 10 in (178 cm)
- Weight: 177 lb (80 kg; 12 st 9 lb)
- Position: Defence
- Shot: Right
- Played for: Buffalo Sabres
- NHL draft: 65th overall, 1974; Buffalo Sabres
- WHA draft: 8th overall 1974; WHA Secret Amateur Draft; Chicago Cougars
- Playing career: 1974–1980

Paul Hugh McIntosh (born March 13, 1953) is a Canadian former professional ice hockey player who played 48 games for the Buffalo Sabres between 1974 and 1976.

== Career ==
After his retirement he coached the London Knights of the Ontario Hockey League in the early 1980s, and also served as the team's General Manager for much of the 1990s. He won CHL Executive of the Year in 1998. He is currently the Head Professional scout for the Dallas Stars.

== Personal life ==
McIntosh was born in Listowel, Ontario.

== Career statistics ==
=== Regular season and playoffs ===
			Regular season					Playoffs
Season	Team	League	GP	G	A	Pts	PIM	GP	G	A	Pts	PIM
1971–72	Peterborough Bees	OHA-B	—	—	—	—	—	—	—	—	—	—
1971–72	Peterborough Petes	OHA	29	2	2	4	39	4	0	1	1	0
1971–72	Peterborough Petes	M-Cup	—	—	—	—	—	3	0	0	0	2
1972–73	Peterborough Petes	OHA	63	7	32	39	67	—	—	—	—	—
1973–74	Peterborough Petes	OHA	62	16	34	50	153	15	0	13	13	—
1974–75	Buffalo Sabres	NHL	6	0	1	1	5	1	0	0	0	0
1974–75	Hershey Bears	AHL	68	2	11	13	195	12	1	1	2	43
1975–76	Buffalo Sabres	NHL	42	0	1	1	61	1	0	0	0	7
1975–76	Hershey Bears	AHL	12	0	2	2	63	—	—	—	—	—
1976–77	Hershey Bears	AHL	62	6	10	16	171	3	0	0	0	6
1977–78	Springfield Indians	AHL	77	5	22	27	189	4	0	0	0	18
1978–79	Saginaw Gears	IHL	78	11	34	45	147	4	0	1	1	6
1979–80	Saginaw Gears	IHL	10	0	3	3	62	—	—	—	—	—
AHL totals			219	13	45	58	618	19	1	1	2	67
NHL totals			48	0	2	2	66	2	0	0	0	7

=== International ===
Year	Team	Event	GP	G	A	Pts	PIM
1974	Canada	WJC	5	3	2	5	6
Junior totals			5	3	2	5	6
