= Murray MacPherson =

English ice hockey goaltender & coach (b.1938)

Murray "Muzz" MacPherson (born 19 February 1938 in London, England), is a retired professional ice hockey goaltender and coach. MacPherson played 12 minor league games in the International Hockey League over two seasons, for the Troy Bruins, Indianapolis Chiefs, Minneapolis Millers and the Fort Wayne Komets.

MacPherson's coaching career including the Winnipeg Monarchs, Winnipeg Clubs, Portage Terriers, Sault Ste. Marie Greyhounds, Jersey Aces/Hampton Aces, Richmond Rifles, New Westminster Bruins, Drumheller Miners, Burnaby Bluehawks and the Langley Eagles. While with the Greyhounds during the 1977–78 OMJHL season, MacPherson coached Wayne Gretzky. Gretzky requested to wear #9 for his idol Gordie Howe, but that number was already taken by linemate Brian Gualazzi. MacPherson suggested wearing two nines would be better than one. From that season on, Gretzky always wore the legendary #99.

== See also ==
- Muzz MacPherson Award
