= Gouin Street Arena =

Former sports complex in Sault Ste. Marie, Ontario

Coordinates: 46.5069°N 84.3284°W

The Gouin Street Arena was the predecessor to the Sault Memorial Gardens, Sault Ste. Marie's premier sports complex from 1949 to 2006. It was built in 1904 on Gouin Street; just off East Street, between Bay and Queen streets. The Arena housed in-season ice surfaces for both ice hockey and curling. The building's seating was bench-style (in much the same fashion as the Memorial Gardens) and capacity was around 1000. On November 8, 1910, a fire completely destroyed the Gouin Street building. The gutted building was repaired and expanded with a wing built on the north side of the original structure, apart from the hockey rink, solely for curling. It was completed by Christmas 1912. Another disastrous fire destroyed the building on July 3, 1965.
