= Mike Lenarduzzi =

Canadian ice hockey player

- Born: September 14, 1972 (age 53) London, Ontario, Canada
- Height: 6 ft 1 in (185 cm)
- Weight: 165 lb (75 kg; 11 st 11 lb)
- Position: Goaltender
- Caught: Left
- Played for: Hartford Whalers
- NHL draft: 57th overall, 1990; Hartford Whalers
- Playing career: 1992–2000

Mike "Whopper" Lenarduzzi (born September 14, 1972) is a Canadian former professional ice hockey goaltender. He played four games in the National Hockey League with the Hartford Whalers during the 1992–93 and 1993–94 seasons. The rest of his career, which lasted from 1992 to 2000, was spent in various minor leagues.

== Playing career ==
Born in London, Ontario, Lenarduzzi played junior hockey for the Oshawa Generals, Sault Ste. Marie Greyhounds, Ottawa 67s and Sudbury Wolves of the Ontario Hockey League before turning professional in 1992 with the Springfield Indians, the American Hockey League (AHL) affiliate of the Hartford Whalers. He had been drafted in the third round of the 1990 NHL entry draft by the Hartford Whalers. He would be in the Hartford system until 1994 - his most notable action with the system being his first regular season game for Springfield, in which he allowed eight goals on the first eleven shots he faced before being pulled - and played four games in the NHL. After 1994, he played for a number of minor league teams including the AHL Hershey Bears in 1996–97. He played one season in the Italian Hockey League for Milan in 1998–99, before finishing his career with one season with the Baton Rouge Kingfish of the ECHL in 1999–00.

== Career statistics ==
=== Regular season and playoffs ===
			Regular season									Playoffs
Season	Team	League	GP	W	L	T	MIN	GA	SO	GAA	SV%	GP	W	L	MIN	GA	SO	GAA	SV%
1988–89	Markham Waxers	CJBHL	23	—	—	—	1149	111	0	5.80	—	—	—	—	—	—	—	—	—
1988–89	Oshawa Generals	OHL	6	0	0	2	166	9	0	3.25	—	—	—	—	—	—	—	—	—
1989–90	Oshawa Generals	OHL	12	6	3	1	444	32	0	4.32	.845	—	—	—	—	—	—	—	—
1989–90	Sault Ste. Marie Greyhounds	OHL	20	8	8	2	1117	66	0	3.55	.884	—	—	—	—	—	—	—	—
1990–91	Sault Ste. Marie Greyhounds	OHL	35	19	8	3	1966	107	0	3.27	.879	5	3	1	268	13	1	2.91	—
1990–91	Sault Ste. Marie Greyhounds	M-Cup	—	—	—	—	—	—	—	—	—	2	0	2	114	8	0	4.21	—
1991–92	Sault Ste. Marie Greyhounds	OHL	9	5	3	0	486	33	0	4.07	.874	—	—	—	—	—	—	—	—
1991–92	Ottawa 67s	OHL	18	5	12	1	986	60	1	3.65	.868	—	—	—	—	—	—	—	—
1991–92	Sudbury Wolves	OHL	22	11	5	4	1201	84	2	4.20	.870	11	4	7	651	38	0	3.50	—
1991–92	Springfield Indians	AHL	—	—	—	—	—	—	—	—	—	1	0	0	39	2	0	3.08	.882
1992–93	Hartford Whalers	NHL	3	1	1	1	167	9	0	3.22	.897	—	—	—	—	—	—	—	—
1992–93	Springfield Indians	AHL	36	10	17	5	1945	142	0	4.38	.849	2	1	0	100	5	0	3.00	—
1993–94	Hartford Whalers	NHL	1	0	0	0	21	1	0	2.83	.917	—	—	—	—	—	—	—	—
1993–94	Springfield Indians	AHL	22	5	7	2	984	73	0	4.45	.840	—	—	—	—	—	—	—	—
1993–94	Salt Lake Golden Eagles	IHL	4	0	4	0	211	22	0	6.25	.833	—	—	—	—	—	—	—	—
1994–95	London Wildcats	CoHL	43	19	16	0	2198	172	0	4.69	.869	5	1	2	274	20	0	4.37	.905
1995–96	Saginaw Wheels	CoHL	43	14	15	3	2153	155	0	4.32	.883	5	1	4	299	19	0	3.82	.878
1996–97	Mobile Mysticks	ECHL	37	15	10	8	1932	118	1	3.66	.874	1	0	1	60	4	0	4.00	—
1996–97	Hershey Bears	AHL	2	0	0	0	13	0	0	0.00	1.000	—	—	—	—	—	—	—	—
1997–98	Mobile Mysticks	ECHL	44	21	13	2	2201	122	2	3.32	.895	3	0	2	133	11	0	4.96	—
1998–99	HC Milan	Alp	15	—	—	—	763	63	0	4.94	—	—	—	—	—	—	—	—	—
1998–99	Amarillo Rattlers	WPHL	9	2	3	2	344	24	0	4.19	.889	—	—	—	—	—	—	—	—
1999–00	Baton Rouge Kingfish	ECHL	54	25	20	2	2749	167	0	3.64	.885	2	0	2	133	63	0	4.96	.825
NHL totals			4	1	1	1	189	10	0	3.18	.899	—	—	—	—	—	—	—	—
