= Batu Gendunov =

Mongolian ice hockey player

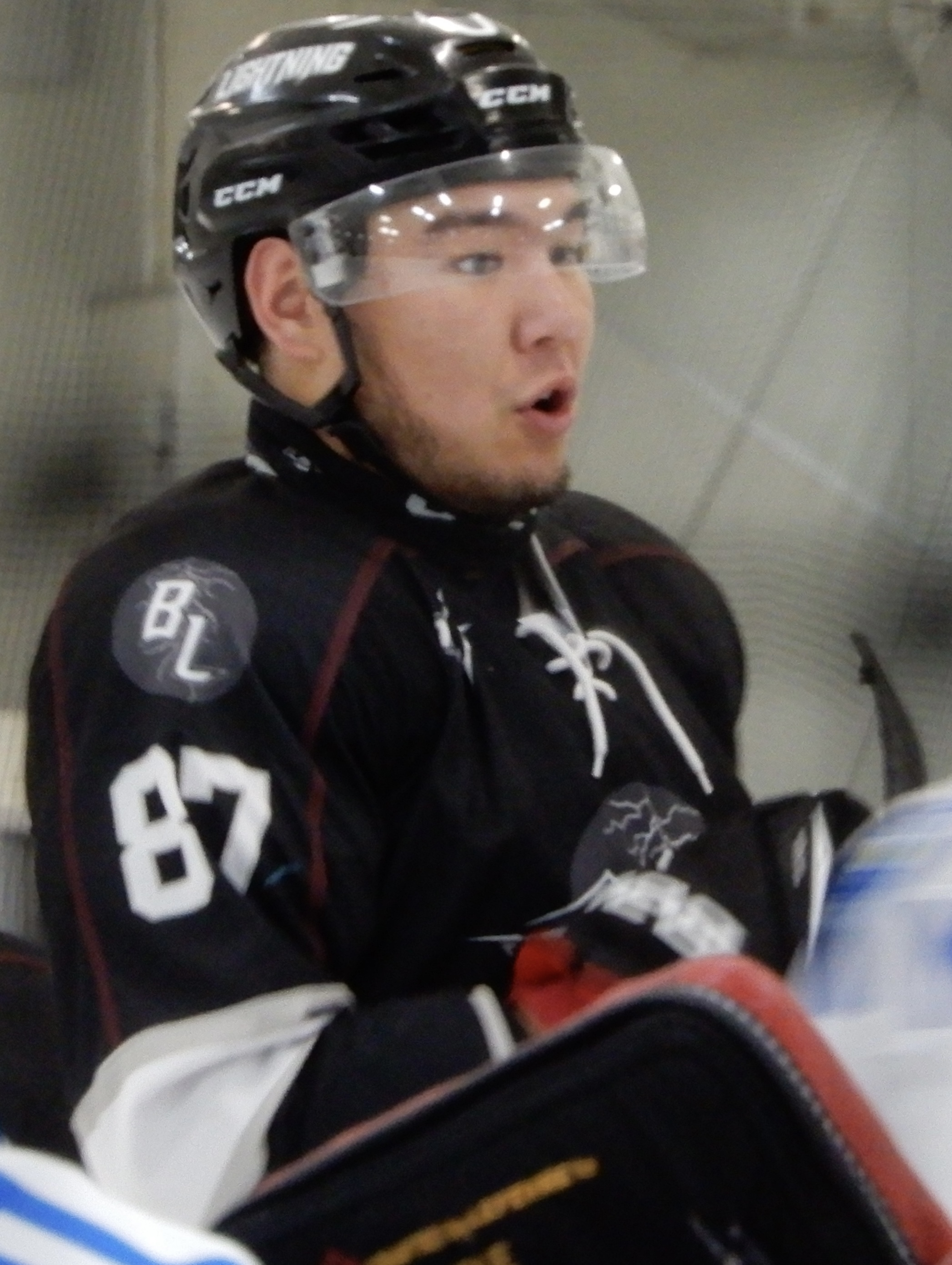
- Gendunov with Brisbane Lightning, 2024
- Born: 4 January 1999 (age 27) Irkutsk, Russia
- Height: 6 ft 6 in (198 cm)
- Weight: 244 lb (111 kg; 17 st 6 lb)
- Position: Forward; Defenceman
- Shoots: Left
- AIHL team Former teams: Brisbane Lightning; Nagoya Orques; Tsen Tou Jilin City; Amur Khabarovsk
- National team: Mongolia

Batu Gendunov (Russian: Бату Гендунов, also known as Batu Batorovich; born 4 January 1999) is a Mongolian-Russian ice hockey player currently playing for the Brisbane Lightning in the Australian Ice Hockey League and the Mongolian national team. He has played for teams in Russia, Uzbekistan, China, Mongolia, Australia and Japan.

== Playing career ==
=== Club ===
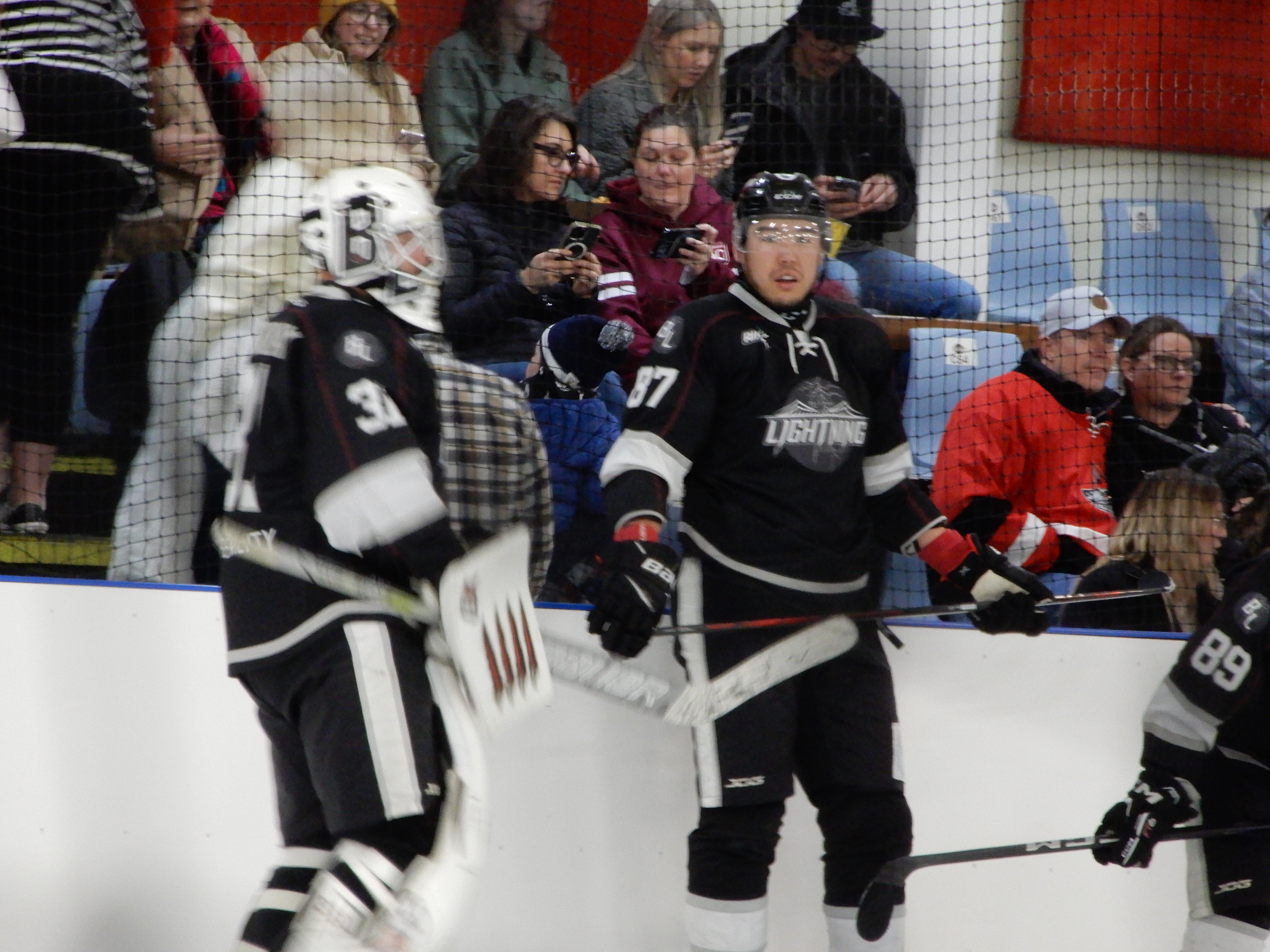
Gendunov with Brisbane Lightning

Gendunov was born in Irkutsk and is ethnically Buryat, visiting Ulan-Ude every summer. He began playing hockey with Yermak Angarsk. At age 13, he joined the CSKA Moscow youth system, with dreams of becoming the first Buryat to play in the Kontinental Hockey League. He also played one season with the Toronto Titans in Canada and learned about the North American style. From 2016 to 2019, he played for Atlant Moscow Oblast, Kapitan Stupino, and Amurskie Tigry Khabarovsk in the MHL and was included on the National Hockey League's 2016-17 Central Scouting Futures List.

In 2019, Gendunov joined Humo Tashkent in Uzbekistan as the team prepared for its first season in the VHL. He played in Humo's first-ever match, a 3–1 exhibition victory over Khimik. He played the full pre-season for the club before departing for fellow VHL club Tsen Tou Jilin City in China. For the 2022/23 season, Gendunov joined Otgon Od of the Mongolia Hockey League. In just three seasons split between Otgon Od and Darkhan, he broke the league scoring records with 130 goals, 108 assists, and 238 points in 40 games. He was the league's top scorer with thirteen goals for Darkhan for the 2023–24 season.

After his first season in Mongolia, representatives from the Australian Ice Hockey League contacted Gendunov. He communicated with them for a year before traveling to Australia and eventually joining the Brisbane Lightning. He quickly established himself as one of the team's most dangerous offensive players, averaging more than a point per game. After two seasons in Australia, it was announced in August 2025 that Gendunov had joined the Nagoya Orques in the Extreme Ice Hockey League, Japan's newly-formed second-tier league, during the Australian league offseason. In February 2026, it was announced that Gendunov would return to the Brisbane Lightning for the 2026 AIHL season.

=== International ===
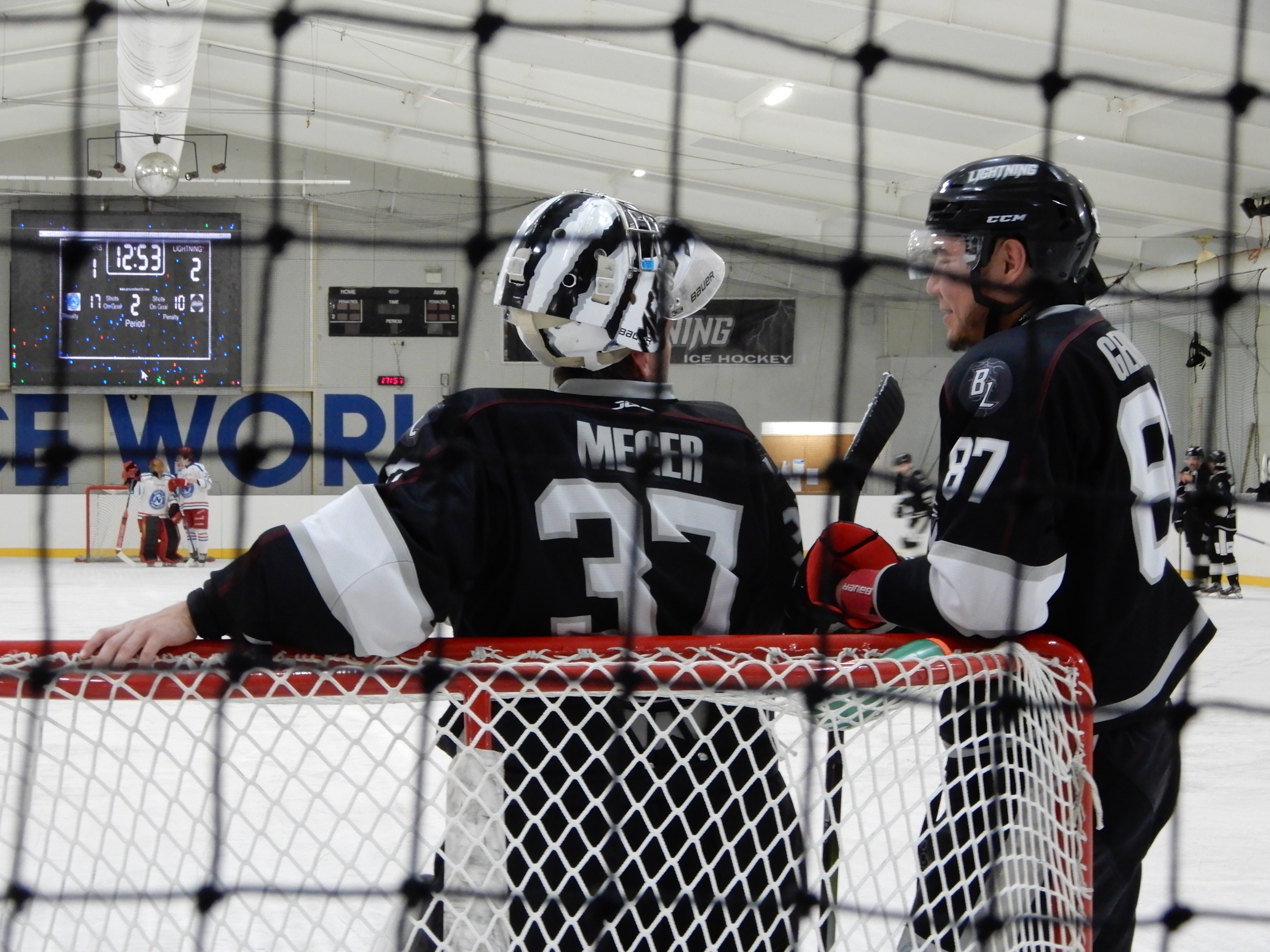

Born in Russia, Gendunov has Mongolian ancestry. In 2021, the Mongolian Ice Hockey Federation contacted him and offered a Mongolian passport so that he could play for the Mongolia national team. He was included on Mongolia's roster for the 2024 IIHF World Championship Division IV, debuting in the competition. He was named the division's Best Defenceman as Mongolia won the championship and was promoted to Division III in 2025. In addition to his defensive contributions, the player tallied twelve points in three games, placing him fourth in scoring in the division.

In the 2025 competition, Gendunov was Mongolia's top scorer with nine goals and eleven assists in five games as he was again named his division's Best Defenseman while also serving as an alternate captain. With twenty points, he finished second in the division's scoring chart. The following year, Gendunov scored fourteen points in nine games to earn a place among the top ten scorers in the division.

== Career statistics ==
=== Regular season and playoffs ===
			Regular season					Playoffs
Season	Team	League	GP	G	A	Pts	PIM	GP	G	A	Pts	PIM
2014–15	Toronto Titans	GTHL	2	0	0	0	2	0	0	0	0	0
2016–17	Atlant Moscow Oblast	MHL	21	0	0	0	8	0	0	0	0	0
2017–18	Kapitan Stupino	MHL	13	0	2	2	4	0	0	0	0	0
2017–18	Amurskie Tigry Khabarovsk	MHL	24	1	3	4	14	0	0	0	0	0
2018–19	Amurskie Tigry Khabarovsk	MHL	62	3	9	11	75	0	0	0	0	0
2019–20	Tsen Tou Jilin City	VHL	13	0	0	0	10	0	0	0	0	0
2021–22	Otgon Od Blast	MIHL	4	18	11	29	-	0	0	0	0	0
2022–23	Otgon Od Blast	MIHL	8	29	22	51	-	0	0	0	0	0
2023–24	Darkhan Burhant Bulls	MIHL	12	31	26	57	-	0	0	0	0	0
2023–24	Brisbane Lightning	AIHL	23	13	13	26	10	1	0	0	0	0
2024–25	Darkhan Burhant Bulls	MIHL	16	52	49	101	6	0	0	0	0	0
2024–25	Brisbane Lightning	AIHL	24	15	23	38	4	1	0	0	0	0
2025–26	Nagoya Orques	XHL	9	9	10	19	-	0	0	0	0	0
2025–26	Brisbane Lightning	AIHL	28	21	26	47	8	1	0	0	0	0
2026–27	Nagoya Orques	XHL	0	0	0	0	-	0	0	0	0	0

=== International ===
Year	Team	Event	Result	GP	G	A	Pts	PIM
2024	Mongolia	WC D4	1st	3	6	6	12	0
2025	Mongolia	WC D3B	4th	5	9	11	20	6
2026	Mongolia	WC D3B	5th	5	5	9	14	27
Senior totals				13	20	26	46	33

== Personal ==
Gendunov holds a degree from the Moscow Automobile and Road Construction State Technical University and is a certified engineer. He is the cousin of Bair Gendunov, former hockey player who last played for the Sheffield Steeldogs of the National Ice Hockey League in England before retiring in August 2026.
