= DyDo Drinco Ice Arena =

Indoor sporting arena in Nishitokyo, Tokyo, Japan

Coordinates: 35°43′41″N 139°33′55″E

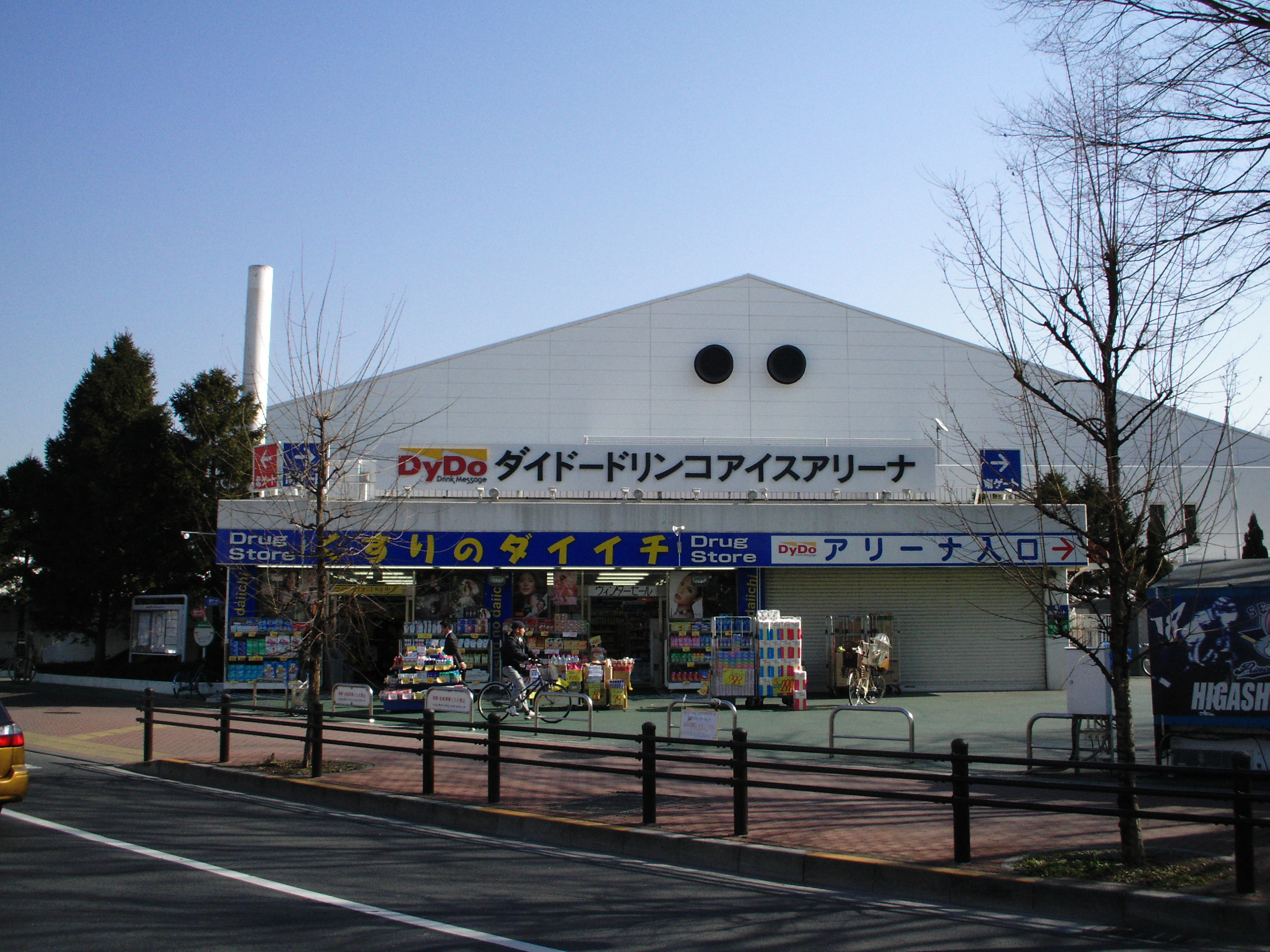
- Interactive map of DyDo Drinco Ice Arena
- Location: Nishitōkyō, Tokyo, Japan
- Owner: Seibu Group
- Operator: Suntory
- Capacity: 2,482

Construction
- Opened: 1984

The DyDo Drinco Ice Arena (ダイドードリンコ アイスアリーナ) is an indoor sporting arena located in Nishitōkyō, Tokyo, Japan. The arena opened in 1984. It has a capacity of 3,500 people (2,482 seated and 1,018 standing). It was the home ice of the now defunct Seibu Prince Rabbits, an Asia League Ice Hockey team, and is currently the home ice of the Tokyo Wilds of the Extreme Ice Hockey League.

The Osaka based beverage company DyDo acquired the naming right of the arena, originally named Higashi-Fushimi Ice Arena (東伏見アイスアリーナ), in 2006.

The arena is located in front of Higashi-Fushimi Station, a station of the Seibu Shinjuku Line connecting Shinjuku, Tokyo with Kawagoe, Saitama. The line is operated by Seibu Railway, the owner of the arena and the Prince Rabbits team.
