= 2024 IIHF World Championship Division IV =

Ice hockey world championships

Tournament details
- Host country: Kuwait
- Venue: 1 (in 1 host city)
- Dates: 16–19 April
- Teams: 4

Tournament statistics
- Games played: 6
- Goals scored: 79 (13.17 per game)
- Attendance: 996 (166 per game)
- Scoring leader: (Kuwait) Ilia Drozdetskikh (17 points)

Official website
- IIHF

The 2024 IIHF World Championship Division IV was an international ice hockey tournament run by the International Ice Hockey Federation.

The tournament was played in Kuwait City, Kuwait, between 16 and 19 April 2024.

Mongolia finished first and was promoted.

== Participating teams ==
Team	Qualification
Malaysia	Placed 6th in Division III B in 2023 and was relegated.
Mongolia	Placed 2nd in Division IV in 2023.
Kuwait	Host, placed 3rd in Division IV in 2023.
Indonesia	Placed 4th in Division IV in 2023.

== Match officials ==
Three referees and five linesmen were selected for the tournament.

Referees	Linesmen
(New Zealand) Ryan Cairns; (Norway) Mats Wikstrand; (South Korea) Kang Tae-woo	(Italy) Marco Tomasello; (Malaysia) Chua Jien Yang; (Singapore) Benjamin Huang; (United Arab Emirates) Ahmed Al-Farsi; (United Arab Emirates) Abdallah Al-Hammadi

== Standings ==
Pos	Team	Pld	W	OTW	OTL	L	GF	GA	GD	Pts	Promotion
1	Mongolia	3	3	0	0	0	28	7	+21	9	Promoted to the 2025 Division III B
2	Kuwait (H)	3	2	0	0	1	25	13	+12	6	
3	Indonesia	3	0	1	0	2	17	23	−6	2	
4	Malaysia	3	0	0	1	2	9	36	−27	1	

Source: IIHF
Rules for classification: 1) points; 2) head-to-head points; 3) head-to-head goal difference; 4) head-to-head number of goals scored; 5) result against closest best-ranked team outside tied teams; 6) result against second-best ranked team outside tied teams; 7) seeding before tournament.
(H) Host

== Results ==
All times are local (UTC+3).

16 April 2024; 14:00	Mongolia	9–3 (2–0, 2–1, 5–2)	Indonesia	Kuwait Ice Skating Rink, Kuwait City; Attendance: 50

Game reference

Bazarvaani Baatarkhuu
Goalies
Izzan Rais
Referee:
(South Korea) Kang Tae-woo
Linesmen:
(United Arab Emirates) Abdallah Al-Hammadi
(Malaysia) Chua Jien Yang

Batorovich (Nyamdavaa) – 09:53	1–0
Enkhsukh (Nyamdavaa, Batorovich) (PP) – 18:37	2–0
Batorovich (SH) – 21:43	3–0
Enkh-Amgalan (Munkhtulga) – 28:14	4–0
	4–1	37:15 – Novendra
Nyamdavaa (Batorovich) (PP) – 44:39	5–1
	5–2	46:44 – Salomo (Siregar)
Nyamdavaa (Munkhtulga) – 47:10	6–2
Namjil (Batorovich, Nyamdavaa) – 48:12	7–2
Tsengel (Mishigsuren) – 51:23	8–2
	8–3	52:59 – Hafiz
Gerelt (Tserenbaljir) – 55:05	9–3

8 min
Penalties
6 min
34
Shots
4

16 April 2024; 18:00	Malaysia	1–15 (1–6, 0–5, 0–4)	Kuwait	Kuwait Ice Skating Rink, Kuwait City; Attendance: 250

Game reference

Muhammad Tengku
Muhammad Haikal
Goalies
Adam Barvik
Referee:
(New Zealand) Ryan Cairns
Linesmen:
(United Arab Emirates) Ahmed Al-Farsi
(Italy) Marco Tomasello

	0–1	00:08 – Ziđarević (Drozdetskikh, Al-Sarraf)
	0–2	05:13 – Ziđarević (Al-Sarraf)
	0–3	07:32 – Al-Sarraf (Ziđarević, Drozdetskikh)
	0–4	11:34 – Ziđarević (Al-Sarraf, Al-Awadhi) (SH)
	0–5	13:46 – Al-Daei
Versluis (Fadzli) – 15:53	1–5
	1–6	18:25 – Ziđarević (Al-Khashan)
	1–7	20:16 – Al-Sarraf (Drozdetskikh, Al-Awadhi)
	1–8	21:01 – Drozdetskikh (Al-Awadhi, Al-Sarraf)
	1–9	30:01 – Drozdetskikh
	1–10	31:03 – Al-Awadhi (Al-Sarraf, Drozdetskikh)
	1–11	38:22 – Al-Sarraf (Ziđarević) (SH)
	1–12	47:14 – Drozdetskikh (Ziđarević, Al-Khashan)
	1–13	54:44 – Ziđarević (Drozdetskikh, Al-Sarraf)
	1–14	58:53 – Al-Sarraf (Ziđarević)
	1–15	58:59 – Ziđarević (Al-Sarraf)

6 min
Penalties
12 min
16
Shots
49

18 April 2024; 14:00	Indonesia	7–6 OT (2–3, 0–2, 4–1) (OT: 1–0)	Malaysia	Kuwait Ice Skating Rink, Kuwait City; Attendance: 60

Game reference

Izzan Rais
Goalies
Muhammad Haikal
Referee:
(Norway) Mats Wikstrand
Linesmen:
(United Arab Emirates) Abdallah Al-Hammadi
(Singapore) Benjamin Huang

Siregar (Novendra, Hafiz) – 03:10	1–0
	1–1	07:05 – Azra (Fadzli)
Salomo (Wijaya, Praptasuganda) (PP) – 11:39	2–1
	2–2	14:56 – Lim (SH)
	2–3	18:05 – Haikal (Azra, Versluis) (PP)
	2–4	25:40 – Versluis (PS)
	2–5	33:03 – Versluis (Azra)
Wijaya (Salomo) – 48:02	3–5
Praptasuganda (Kaykobad, Salomo) – 49:31	4–5
Salomo (Praptasuganda) – 52:21	5–5
	5–6	56:18 – Lim
Praptasuganda (Wijaya) (EA) – 58:37	6–6
Novendra – 61:10	7–6

10 min
Penalties
8 min
21
Shots
15

18 April 2024; 18:00	Mongolia	5–2 (2–1, 1–0, 2–1)	Kuwait	Kuwait Ice Skating Rink, Kuwait City; Attendance: 260

Game reference

Bazarvaani Baatarkhuu
Baatarkhuu Sodbileg
Goalies
Adam Barvik
Referee:
(New Zealand) Ryan Cairns
Linesmen:
(Malaysia) Chua Jien Yang
(Italy) Marco Tomasello

Gerelt – 01:43	1–0
Tsengel (Batorovich) – 05:26	2–0
	2–1	07:23 – Al-Daei (Drozdetskikh, Al-Sarraf)
Gerelt (Munkhtuvshin) – 30:46	3–1
	3–2	42:23 – Drozdetskikh (Al-Sarraf)
Batorovich (PS) – 44:43	4–2
Mishigsuren (PP) – 47:32	5–2

162 min
Penalties
194 min
30
Shots
9

19 April 2024; 14:00	Malaysia	2–14 (1–7, 0–2, 1–5)	Mongolia	Kuwait Ice Skating Rink, Kuwait City; Attendance: 76

Game reference

Muhammad Haikal
Muhammad Tengku
Goalies
Bazarvaani Baatarkhuu
Baatarkhuu Sodbileg
Referee:
(South Korea) Kang Tae-woo
Linesmen:
(Singapore) Benjamin Huang
(Italy) Marco Tomasello

	0–1	05:11 – Lkhagvadorj (Mishigsuren, Enkhsukh)
Lim (Versluis, Mohammad) – 06:45	1–1
	1–2	07:49 – Munkhtulga (Enkh-Amgalan)
	1–3	08:36 – Batorovich
	1–4	12:12 – Batorovich (Nyamdavaa) (PP)
	1–5	18:00 – Ariunbileg
	1–6	18:45 – Batorovich (Bilguun, Namjil)
	1–7	19:38 – Munkhtuvshin (Shinebayar)
	1–8	23:29 – Enkhsukh (Tserenbaljir)
	1–9	29:16 – Lkhagvadorj
	1–10	44:51 – Nyamdavaa
	1–11	45:25 – Ariunbileg (Batorovich)
	1–12	51:26 – Namjil (Batorovich, Tsengel)
Raja (Versluis) (PP) – 52:16	2–12
	2–13	58:09 – Tserenbaljir (Gerelt, Tsengel)
	2–14	58:54 – Mishigsuren (Tsengel)

8 min
Penalties
17 min
9
Shots
26

19 April 2024; 18:00	Kuwait	8–7 (2–3, 3–1, 3–3)	Indonesia	Kuwait Ice Skating Rink, Kuwait City; Attendance: 300

Game reference

Adam Barvik
Goalies
Izzan Rais
Referee:
(Norway) Mats Wikstrand
Linesmen:
(United Arab Emirates) Ahmed Al-Farsi
(Malaysia) Chua Jien Yang

Drozdetskikh (Ziđarević) – 04:19	1–0
	1–1	05:29 – Novendra (Siregar, Prijanto)
	1–2	08:20 – Fadilla (Zea)
	1–3	08:39 – Siregar (Novendra, Al-Qaeda)
Ziđarević (Drozdetskikh) – 16:12	2–3
Drozdetskikh (Al-Sarraf) (PP) – 28:09	3–3
	3–4	29:25 – Novendra (PP)
Drozdetskikh (Ziđarević) (SH) – 30:34	4–4
Al-Sarraf (Al-Awadhi) – 32:30	5–4
	5–5	41:23 – Salomo (Kaykobad)
Ziđarević (Drozdetskikh) (PP) – 43:21	6–5
Ziđarević (Drozdetskikh, Al-Sarraf) (PP) – 47:16	7–5
	7–6	51:24 – Siregar (Al-Qaeda)
	7–7	51:33 – Salomo
Al-Maragi (Drozdetskikh) – 54:22	8–7

18 min
Penalties
12 min
23
Shots
28

== Statistics ==
=== Scoring leaders ===
List shows the top skaters sorted by points, then goals.

Player	GP	G	A	Pts	+/−	PIM	POS
(Kuwait) Ilia Drozdetskikh	3	7	10	17	+13	8	F
(Kuwait) Ali Al-Sarraf	3	5	11	16	+14	0	F
(Kuwait) Bojan Ziđarević	3	9	6	15	+15	8	F
(Mongolia) Batu Batorovich	3	6	6	12	+7	0	F
(Indonesia) Lucas Salomo	3	5	2	7	+2	0	F
(Mongolia) Urtnasan Nyamdavaa	3	3	4	7	+9	25	D
(Indonesia) Abraham Novendra	3	4	2	6	+3	0	F
(Malaysia) Deen Versluis	3	3	3	6	–10	4	F
(Indonesia) Kenneth Siregar	3	3	2	5	0	0	F
(Mongolia) Undarmaa Tsengel	3	2	3	5	+9	2	F

GP = Games played; G = Goals; A = Assists; Pts = Points; +/− = Plus/Minus; PIM = Penalties in Minutes; POS = Position
Source: IIHF.com

=== Goaltending leaders ===
Only the top five goaltenders, based on save percentage, who have played at least 40% of their team's minutes, are included in this list.

Player	TOI	GA	GAA	SA	Sv%	SO
(Kuwait) Adam Barvik	180:00	13	4.33	74	82.43	0
(Indonesia) Izzan Rais	18:13	23	7.66	72	68.06	0
(Malaysia) Muhammad Haikal	141:10	25	10.63	72	65.28	0
(Mongolia) Bazarvaani Baatarkhuu	127:19	6	2.83	13	53.85	0

TOI = time on ice (minutes:seconds); SA = shots against; GA = goals against; GAA = goals against average; Sv% = save percentage; SO = shutouts
Source: IIHF.com

== Awards ==
Position	Player
Goaltender	(Kuwait) Adam Barvik
Defenceman	(Mongolia) Batu Batorovich
Forward	(Kuwait) Bojan Ziđarević
