= 2025 IIHF World Championship Division III =

Ice hockey world championships

Tournament details
- Host countries: Turkey; Mexico
- Venues: 2 (in 2 host cities)
- Dates: 21–27 April; 27 April – 3 May
- Teams: 12

The 2025 IIHF World Championship Division III consisted of two international ice hockey tournaments organized by the International Ice Hockey Federation. Divisions III A and III B represented the sixth and the seventh tier of the IIHF Ice Hockey World Championships.

Kyrgyzstan won Group A and got promoted to Division II, while Luxembourg was relegated. Mexico won Group B and got promoted, while Singapore was relegated to Division IV.

== Group A tournament ==
2025 IIHF World Championship Division III A

Tournament details
- Host country: Turkey
- City: Istanbul
- Venue: 1 (in 1 host city)
- Dates: 21–27 April
- Teams: 6

Tournament statistics
- Games played: 15
- Goals scored: 100 (6.67 per game)
- Attendance: 7,028 (469 per game)
- Scoring leader: (Kyrgyzstan) Mamed Seifulov (9 points)

Official website
- Website

The Division III Group A tournament was played in Istanbul, Turkey from 21 to 27 April 2025.

=== Participating teams ===
Team	Qualification
Turkey	Host, placed 6th in Division II B in 2024 and was relegated.
Kyrgyzstan	Placed 2nd in Division III A in 2024.
Luxembourg	Placed 3rd in Division III A in 2024.
Turkmenistan	Placed 4th in Division III A in 2024.
South Africa	Placed 5th in Division III A in 2024.
Bosnia and Herzegovina	Placed 1st in Division III B in 2024 and was promoted.

=== Match officials ===
Four referees and seven linesmen were selected for the tournament.

Referees	Linesmen
(Croatia) Filip Metzinger; (Netherlands) Nicolaas van Grinsven; (New Zealand) Ryan Cairns; (Norway) Petter Bakken	(Bulgaria) Martin Boyadjiev; (Iceland) Óli Gunnarsson; (Kazakhstan) Damir Dairov; (Slovakia) Jozef Tichý; (South Korea) Kang Kyu-seong; (Turkey) Taha Kavlakoğlu; (Turkey) Gökhan Peker

=== Standings ===
Pos	Team	Pld	W	OTW	OTL	L	GF	GA	GD	Pts	Promotion or relegation
1	Kyrgyzstan	5	5	0	0	0	27	5	+22	15	Promoted to the 2026 Division II B
2	Turkmenistan	5	3	1	0	1	20	18	+2	11	
3	Turkey (H)	5	3	0	0	2	19	8	+11	9	
4	South Africa	5	1	0	1	3	12	24	−12	4	
5	Bosnia and Herzegovina	5	1	0	0	4	12	16	−4	3 (Note: Luxembourg 2–6 Bosnia and Herzegovina)	
6	Luxembourg	5	1	0	0	4	10	29	−19	3	Relegated to the 2026 Division III B

Source: IIHF
Rules for classification: 1) points; 2) head-to-head points; 3) head-to-head goal difference; 4) head-to-head number of goals scored; 5) result against closest best-ranked team outside tied teams; 6) result against second-best ranked team outside tied teams; 7) seeding before tournament.
(H) Host

=== Results ===
All times are local (UTC+3).

21 April 2025; 13:00	Kyrgyzstan	5–2 (2–1, 2–0, 1–1)	South Africa	Zeytinburnu Ice Rink, Istanbul; Attendance: 75

Game reference

Alexander Petrov
Goalies
Ryan Boyd
Referee:
(Croatia) Filip Metzinger
Linesmen:
(Turkey) Gökhan Peker
(Slovakia) Jozef Tichý

	0–1	00:47 – Samaii (Van Doesburgh)
Kudashev (Titov) – 03:59	1–1
Tonkikh (Chuvalov, Shirokov) – 12:32	2–1
Nosov (Kudashev, Shirokov) – 30:46	3–1
Tonkikh (Terentyev) (PP) – 32:28	4–1
Seifulov (PS) – 44:28	5–1
	5–2	58:30 – Morris (Obery)

8 min
Penalties
10 min
43
Shots
22

21 April 2025; 16:30	Bosnia and Herzegovina	1–3 (1–1, 0–0, 0–2)	Turkmenistan	Zeytinburnu Ice Rink, Istanbul; Attendance: 55

Game reference

Ivan Popov
Goalies
Keremli Charyyev
Referee:
(New Zealand) Ryan Cairns
Linesmen:
(Bulgaria) Martin Boyadjiev
(Turkey) Taha Kavlakoğlu

	0–1	04:37 – Annasaparov (Bayjayev)
Krehić – 13:39	1–1
	1–2	46:57 – K. Baylyyev (Vahovskiy, Hydyrov)
	1–3	49:51 – Hydyrov (Vahovskiy, Annageldiyev)

37 min
Penalties
6 min
25
Shots
42

21 April 2025; 20:00	Luxembourg	1–7 (0–4, 0–2, 1–1)	Turkey	Zeytinburnu Ice Rink, Istanbul; Attendance: 1,453

Game reference

Sven Oberweis
Goalies
Sava Voronov
Referee:
(Netherlands) Nicolaas van Grinsven
Linesmen:
(Kazakhstan) Damir Dairov
(Iceland) Óli Gunnarsson

	0–1	03:46 – Bakal (Bingöl, E. Faner)
	0–2	05:11 – Çolak (Savaş, Ö. Karş)
	0–3	17:54 – Karadağ (Bakal, Bingöl)
	0–4	18:53 – F. Faner (Y. Karş, Bingöl) (PP)
	0–5	23:43 – Kabay (Hars)
	0–6	32:16 – Karadağ (Bingöl)
Cannon (Mossong, Mosr) – 46:10	1–6
	1–7	48:15 – E. Faner (Savaş, Çolak) (PP)

10 min
Penalties
0 min
19
Shots
45

22 April 2025; 13:00	South Africa	3–2 (1–0, 2–1, 0–1)	Bosnia and Herzegovina	Zeytinburnu Ice Rink, Istanbul; Attendance: 57

Game reference

Ryan Boyd
Goalies
Ivan Popov
Referee:
(Norway) Petter Bakken
Linesmen:
(Turkey) Taha Kavlakoğlu
(Slovakia) Jozef Tichý

Kamish (Levi, Compton) – 17:44	1–0
	1–1	20:52 – Mlivić (Miškić, H. Mrkva)
Kluyts (Valadas, Morris) – 23:13	2–1
Carelse (Samaai, Van Doesburgh) – 23:28	3–1
	3–2	57:28 – T. Mrkva (Mlivić, Drnda) (PP)

31 min
Penalties
8 min
33
Shots
43

22 April 2025; 16:30	Kyrgyzstan	6–0 (0–0, 3–0, 3–0)	Luxembourg	Zeytinburnu Ice Rink, Istanbul; Attendance: 150

Game reference

Alexander Petrov
Goalies
Sven Oberweis
Sven Cruchten
Referee:
(Croatia) Filip Metzinger
Linesmen:
(Kazakhstan) Damir Dairov
(Turkey) Gökhan Peker

Chuvalov (Terentyev, Tonkikh) – 28:58	1–0
Mirbekov (Bekmuratov) – 30:47	2–0
Seifulov (Abdyraev, Kudashev) – 37:20	3–0
Nosov (Chuvalov, Terentyev) – 52:33	4–0
Abdyraev (Seifulov) – 53:33	5–0
Abdyraev (Chuvalov, Titov) – 55:24	6–0

4 min
Penalties
6 min
50
Shots
13

22 April 2025; 20:00	Turkey	1–2 (1–1, 0–1, 0–0)	Turkmenistan	Zeytinburnu Ice Rink, Istanbul; Attendance: 1,071

Game reference

Sava Voronov
Goalies
Keremli Charyyev
Referee:
(New Zealand) Ryan Cairns
Linesmen:
(Bulgaria) Martin Boyadjiev
(South Korea) Kang Kyu-seong

	0–1	07:29 – K. Baylyyev (Vahovskiy, Tannyyev)
Bakal (Y. Karş, F. Faner) (PP) – 16:36	1–1
	1–2	21:36 – Vahovskiy (Barkovskiy)

8 min
Penalties
6 min
28
Shots
25

24 April 2025; 13:00	Luxembourg	3–8 (1–1, 1–0, 1–7)	Turkmenistan	Zeytinburnu Ice Rink, Istanbul; Attendance: 55

Game reference

Sven Oberweis
Goalies
Keremli Charyyev
Referee:
(New Zealand) Ryan Cairns
Linesmen:
(South Korea) Kang Kyu-seong
(Turkey) Gökhan Peker

Mossong (Mosr, Cannon) – 09:28	1–0
	1–1	17:07 – Barkovskiy (Tannyyev, Baylyyev)
Cannon (Mossong) – 36:23	2–1
	2–2	42:40 – Baymyradov
	2–3	47:12 – M. Baylyyev (Kakabayev)
	2–4	47:37 – Baymyradov (Annageldiyev)
	2–5	48:07 – Barkovskiy
	2–6	48:54 – Annageldiyev (Aganiyazov) (PP)
	2–7	54:17 – Gylyjov
Mossong (Springer, Cannon) (PP) – 55:53	3–7
	3–8	58:00 – Barkovskiy (Kakajanov)

6 min
Penalties
8 min
28
Shots
38

24 April 2025; 16:30	Kyrgyzstan	5–1 (2–0, 1–0, 2–1)	Bosnia and Herzegovina	Zeytinburnu Ice Rink, Istanbul; Attendance: 63

Game reference

Alexander Petrov
Goalies
Ivan Popov
Referee:
(Netherlands) Nicolaas van Grinsven
Linesmen:
(Kazakhstan) Damir Dairov
(Slovakia) Jozef Tichý

Isamatov – 07:13	1–0
Seifulov (Titov, Mirbekov) – 10:09	2–0
Seifulov (Isamatov, Terentyev) – 30:37	3–0
Shirokov (Terentyev) (PP) – 43:08	4–0
	4–1	52:01 – Krehić (T. Mrkva, Miškić) (PP)
Saptiov (PP) – 59:56	5–1

73 min
Penalties
87 min
56
Shots
20

24 April 2025; 20:00	Turkey	7–0 (3–0, 3–0, 1–0)	South Africa	Zeytinburnu Ice Rink, Istanbul; Attendance: 750

Game reference

Sava Voronov
Goalies
Ryan Boyd
Ruan van der Merwe
Referee:
(Norway) Petter Bakken
Linesmen:
(Bulgaria) Martin Boyadjiev
(Iceland) Óli Gunnarsson

Bakal (İnandı) – 06:39	1–0
Uzunali (Odabaş, Çolak) – 12:01	2–0
Ö. Karş (Demirdelen, Uzunali) – 17:51	3–0
F. Faner (Y. Karş, Karadağ) – 27:47	4–0
Savaş (Ö. Karş, E. Faner) 28:03	5–0
Odabaş (Çolak, Hars) – 37:40	6–0
İnandı (Karadağ, Y. Karş) (PP) – 50:11	7–0

6 min
Penalties
4 min
39
Shots
23

25 April 2025; 13:00	Turkmenistan	1–8 (0–4, 1–3, 0–1)	Kyrgyzstan	Zeytinburnu Ice Rink, Istanbul; Attendance: 45

Game reference

Keremli Charyyev
Goalies
Alexander Petrov
Artem Vasilev
Referee:
(Norway) Petter Bakken
Linesmen:
(Turkey) Taha Kavlakoğlu
(Slovakia) Jozef Tichy

	0–1	06:18 – Abdyraev (Titov, Seifulov)
	0–2	07:57 – Tonkikh (Chuvalov)
	0–3	09:31 – Mirbekov (Titov, Seifulov)
	0–4	14:45 – Nosov (PP)
	0–5	20:53 – Seifulov (Isamatov) (SH)
	0–6	32:43 – Sapitov (Leshchenko, Popov)
Barkovskiy (Baymyradov) – 34:20	1–6
	1–7	38:02 – Chuvalov (Nosov, Tonkikh)
	1–8	53:08 – Mirbekov (Ismanov, Sapitov)

8 min
Penalties
4 min
11
Shots
56

25 April 2025; 16:30	South Africa	2–4 (1–2, 0–1, 1–1)	Luxembourg	Zeytinburnu Ice Rink, Istanbul; Attendance: 60

Game reference

Sven Oberweis
Goalies
Ryan Boyd
Referee:
(Netherlands) Nicolaas van Grinsven
Linesmen:
(Bulgaria) Martin Boyadjiev
(Iceland) Óli Gunnarsson

Samaii – 08:29	1–0
	1–1	10:20 – Cannon (Beran)
	1–2	17:43 – Mossong (Cannon) (PP)
	1–3	27:00 – Mykkanen (Potucek, Church)
Samaii (Van Doesburgh) – 45:56	2–3
	2–4	59:41 – Cannon (Mossong)

4 min
Penalties
2 min
21
Shots
28

25 April 2025; 20:00	Bosnia and Herzegovina	2–3 (0–3, 1–0, 1–0)	Turkey	Zeytinburnu Ice Rink, Istanbul; Attendance: 1,036

Game reference

Ivan Popov
Goalies
Sava Voronov
Referee:
(Croatia) Filip Metzinger
Linesmen:
(Kazakhstan) Damir Dairov
(South Korea) Kang Kyu-seong

	0–1	05:47 – Bakal (İnandı)
	0–2	08:54 – İnandı (Karadağ)
	0–3	15:35 – Demirdelen (Yavuz)
Gaković (Mlivić, H. Mrkva) (PP) – 21:58	1–3
Mušović (Mlivić) – 43:12	2–3

4 min
Penalties
6 min
19
Shots
35

27 April 2025; 13:00	Luxembourg	2–6 (1–2, 1–3, 0–1)	Bosnia and Herzegovina	Zeytinburnu Ice Rink, Istanbul; Attendance: 75

Game reference

Sven Oberweis
Goalies
Ivan Popov
Referee:
(Croatia) Filip Metzinger
Linesmen:
(Iceland) Óli Gunnarsson
(Slovakia) Jozef Tichy

Mosr (Church) – 04:53	1–0
	1–1	05:37 – Capin (Mušović, Mlivić)
	1–2	11:39 – Gaković (Miškić)
	1–3	22:28 – Smajlović
Cannon – 23:30	2–3
	2–4	23:56 – Capin (H. Mrkva, Mušović)
	2–5	28:26 – T. Mrkva (Mlivić, Filipović) (PP)
	2–6	47:16 – Drnda (H. Mrkva, Cordalija)

4 min
Penalties
2 min
29
Shots
30

27 April 2025; 16:30	Turkmenistan	6–5 OT (2–4, 0–1, 3–0) (OT: 1–0)	South Africa	Zeytinburnu Ice Rink, Istanbul; Attendance: 145

Game reference

Keremli Charyyev
Goalies
Ryan Boyd
Referee:
(Netherlands) Nicolaas van Grinsven
Linesmen:
(Turkey) Taha Kavlakoğlu
(Turkey) Gökhan Peker

Baymyradov (Aganiyazov, Bayjayev) – 00:31	1–0
	1–1	05:35 – Bremner (D. Van der Merwe)
	1–2	13:00 – Mlangeni (Compton)
Baymyradov – 13:07	2–2
	2–3	13:30 – Kamish (Carelse, Levi)
	2–4	15:41 – D. Van der Merwe (Klutys)
	2–5	29:35 – Van Doesburgh (Carelse)
Aganiyazov – 43:12	3–5
Barkovskiy (Baylyyev) – 43:33	4–5
Aganiyazov (EA) – 59:59	5–5
Baylyyev (Hydyrov) – 61:46	6–5

2 min
Penalties
2 min
28
Shots
25

27 April 2025; 20:00	Turkey	1–3 (0–1, 1–1, 0–1)	Kyrgyzstan	Zeytinburnu Ice Rink, Istanbul; Attendance: 1,938

Game reference

Sava Voronov
Goalies
Alexander Petrov
Referee:
(Norway) Petter Bakken
Linesmen:
(Bulgaria) Martin Boyadjiev
(South Korea) Kang Kyu-seong

	0–1	02:09 – Ismanov (Mirbekov)
Bakal (Çolak) – 22:28	1–1
	1–2	26:32 – Chuvalov
	1–3	44:01 – Seifulov (Popov)

2 min
Penalties
2 min
31
Shots
29

=== Statistics ===
==== Scoring leaders ====
List shows the top skaters sorted by points, then goals.

Player	GP	G	A	Pts	+/−	PIM	POS
(Kyrgyzstan) Mamed Seifulov	5	6	3	9	+9	2	F
(Luxembourg) Colm Cannon	5	5	3	8	−2	6	F
(Kyrgyzstan) Mikhail Chuvalov	5	3	4	7	+8	2	F
(Turkey) Ferhat Bakal	5	5	1	6	+6	0	F
(Turkmenistan) Pavel Barkovskiy	5	5	1	6	+5	4	F
(Luxembourg) Claude Mossong	5	3	3	6	−2	2	F
(Kyrgyzstan) Vladimir Tonkikh	5	3	3	6	+5	9	F
(Bosnia and Herzegovina) Adnan Mlivić	5	1	5	6	+1	0	F
(Turkmenistan) Baymyrat Baymyradov	5	4	1	5	+2	0	F
(Turkmenistan) Kerven Baylyyev	5	3	2	5	+8	0	F
(Kyrgyzstan) Ersultan Mirbekov	5	3	2	5	+6	29	F

GP = Games played; G = Goals; A = Assists; Pts = Points; +/− = Plus/Minus; PIM = Penalties in Minutes; POS = Position
Source: IIHF.com

==== Goaltending leaders ====
Only the top five goaltenders, based on save percentage, who have played at least 40% of their team's minutes, are included in this list.

Player	TOI	GA	GAA	SA	Sv%	SO
(Kyrgyzstan) Alexander Petrov	280:00	5	1.07	92	94.57	1
(Turkey) Sava Voronov	296:19	8	1.62	125	93.60	1
(Bosnia and Herzegovina) Ivan Popov	297:36	16	3.23	195	91.79	0
(Turkmenistan) Keremli Charyyev	300:41	18	3.59	161	88.82	0
(South Africa) Ryan Boyd	269:49	22	4.89	161	86.34	0

TOI = time on ice (minutes:seconds); SA = shots against; GA = goals against; GAA = goals against average; Sv% = save percentage; SO = shutouts
Source: IIHF.com

=== Awards ===
Position	Player
Goaltender	(Turkey) Sava Voronov
Defenceman	(Kyrgyzstan) Kuzma Terentyev
Forward	(Kyrgyzstan) Islambek Abdyraev

== Group B tournament ==
2025 IIHF World Championship Division III B

Tournament details
- Host country: Mexico
- City: Querétaro
- Venue: 1 (in 1 host city)
- Dates: 27 April – 3 May
- Teams: 6

Tournament statistics
- Games played: 15
- Goals scored: 190 (12.67 per game)
- Attendance: 3,561 (237 per game)
- Scoring leader: (Mexico) Héctor Majul (20 points)

Official website
- Website

The Division III Group B tournament was played in Santiago de Querétaro, Mexico from 27 April to 3 May 2025.

=== Participating teams ===
Team	Qualification
Mexico	Host, placed 6th in Division III A in 2024 and was relegated.
North Korea	Placed 2nd in Division III B in 2024.
Hong Kong	Placed 3rd in Division III B in 2024.
Philippines	Placed 4th in Division III B in 2024.
Singapore	Placed 5th in Division III B in 2024.
Mongolia	Placed 1st in Division IV in 2024 and was promoted.

=== Match officials ===
Four referees and seven linesmen were selected for the tournament.

Referees	Linesmen
(Austria) Alexander Hlavaty; (Canada) Dominic Cadieux; (Turkey) Murat Aygün; (United States) Chazz Knoche	(Mexico) Emilio Gómez; (Mexico) Óscar Pérez; (Mexico) Sem Ramírez; (South Africa) Jason van Rooyen; (Spain) Aleix Espino; (Spain) Luis Estirado Revuelta; (United States) Zachary Carson

=== Standings ===
Pos	Team	Pld	W	OTW	OTL	L	GF	GA	GD	Pts	Promotion or relegation
1	Mexico (H)	5	5	0	0	0	48	12	+36	15	Promoted to the 2026 Division III A
2	North Korea	5	3	1	0	1	38	23	+15	11	
3	Hong Kong	5	3	0	0	2	42	19	+23	9	
4	Mongolia	5	2	0	0	3	36	29	+7	6	
5	Philippines	5	1	0	1	3	22	46	−24	4	
6	Singapore	5	0	0	0	5	4	61	−57	0	Relegated to the 2026 Division IV

Source: IIHF
Rules for classification: 1) points; 2) head-to-head points; 3) head-to-head goal difference; 4) head-to-head number of goals scored; 5) result against closest best-ranked team outside tied teams; 6) result against second-best ranked team outside tied teams; 7) seeding before tournament.
(H) Host

=== Results ===
All times are local (UTC−5).

27 April 2025; 13:00	Mongolia	13–7 (6–3, 4–3, 3–1)	Philippines	Lakeside Ice Park, Santiago de Querétaro; Attendance: 104

Game reference

Enkhkhuslen Enkh-Erdene
Sodbileg Baatarkhuu
Goalies
Gianpietro Iseppi
Irell Pérez
Referee:
(Canada) Dominic Cadieux
Linesmen:
(Spain) Aleix Espino
(Mexico) Emilio Gómez

Batorovich – 01:37	1–0
Davaanyam (Boldbaatar) – 02:27	2–0
Urtnasan (Batorovich, Davaanyam) (PP) – 04:37	3–0
Batorovich (Mishigsuren, Ankhbayar) – 05:15	4–0
	4–1	05:57 – Sibug (Regencia, Füglister) (PP)
	4–2	11:26 – Tigaronita (Crisostomo, Billones)
Batorovich – 11:38	5–2
Mishigsuren (Ankhbayar) – 13:28	6–2
	6–3	14:15 – Abis (Sibug)
	6–4	20:17 – Sze (Tigaronita) (SH)
	6–5	22:20 – Billones (Füglister) (SH)
	6–6	27:08 – Sze
Batorovich – 29:20	7–6
Ankhbayar (Mishigsuren, Batorovich) – 33:20	8–6
Mishigsuren (Batorovich, Ankhbayar) – 39:10	9–6
Batorovich – 39:48	10–6
	10–7	45:11 – Regencia (Füglister, Sze)
Urtnasan (Batorovich, Mishigsuren) (PP) – 48:19	11–7
Mishigsuren (Batorovich, Ankhbayar) – 50:54	12–7
Batorovich (Boldbaatar, Urtnasan) – 58:01	13–7

2 min
Penalties
31 min
37
Shots
21

27 April 2025; 16:30	North Korea	14–1 (5–0, 6–1, 3–0)	Singapore	Lakeside Ice Park, Santiago de Querétaro; Attendance: 92

Game reference

Kim Kang-gun
Jong Kang-song
Goalies
Joshua Lee
Referee:
(Turkey) Murat Aygün
Linesmen:
(United States) Zachary Carson
(Mexico) Óscar Pérez

Pak C. – 00:58	1–0
Kim I. – 08:19	2–0
Choe C. (PP) – 10:35	3–0
Kim S. – 13:41	4–0
Han K. – 14:43	5–0
Pak Y. – 21:36	6–0
	6–1	22:19 – Ze. Wong (B. Lee)
Kim I. (Hong) – 27:14	7–1
Pak K. (Pak C., Kim Ku.) (PP) – 29:28	8–1
Kim S. (Ho) – 31:03	9–1
Pak Y. (Han K.) (SH) – 36:26	10–1
Hong (PP) – 38:48	11–1
Han K. – 54:59	12–1
Kim Ku. – 59:36	13–1
Hong – 59:53	14–1

8 min
Penalties
10 min
27
Shots
6

27 April 2025; 20:30	Hong Kong	2–5 (1–2, 0–1, 1–2)	Mexico	Lakeside Ice Park, Santiago de Querétaro; Attendance: 513

Game reference

Cheung Ching Ho
Goalies
Alfonso de Alba
Referee:
(Austria) Alexander Hlavaty
Linesmen:
(Spain) Luis Estirado Revuelta
(South Africa) Jason van Rooyen

	0–1	03:33 – Hagerman (Majul, L. Valencia) (PP)
	0–2	11:00 – L. Valencia (Tapia, A. Valencia)
Cheng (Pang, Wong K.) – 18:58	1–2
	1–3	28:03 – Majul (Hagerman)
Tang (L. Wong, Cheng) (PP) – 41:01	2–3
	2–4	50:19 – Majul (Ugarte, Cuellar)
	2–5	58:40 – Majul (Rullan, L. Valencia)

10 min
Penalties
22 min
12
Shots
29

28 April 2025; 13:00	Singapore	1–11 (0–1, 0–4, 1–6)	Mongolia	Lakeside Ice Park, Santiago de Querétaro; Attendance: 57

Game reference

Joshua Lee
Goalies
Enkhkhuslen Enkh-Erdene
Referee:
(Austria) Alexander Hlavaty
Linesmen:
(Spain) Luis Estirado Revuelta
(Mexico) Sem Ramírez

	0–1	07:22 – Boldbaatar (Mishigsuren, Urtnasan)
	0–2	23:08 – Erdenejav (Batbaatar, Ganbaatar)
	0–3	24:47 – Batbaatar (Mishigsuren, Ankhbayar)
	0–4	26:42 – Ganbaatar (Lkhagvasuren, Mishigsuren)
	0–5	37:51 – Batorovich (Urtnasan, Am. Erdenebat)
	0–6	44:25 – Davaanyam (Enkhtur, Ganbaatar) (PP)
	0–7	48:51 – Davaanyam (Undarmaa, Boldbaatar)
J. Chan – 49:24	1–7
	1–8	51:27 – Boldbaatar (Undarmaa, Batorovich)
	1–9	52:50 – Enkhtur (Batorovich, Urtnasan)
	1–10	53:40 – Ankhbayar (Undarmaa, Batorovich)
	1–11	59:52 – Davaanyam (Batorovich, Ar. Erdenebat) (PP)

8 min
Penalties
4 min
15
Shots
66

28 April 2025; 16:30	North Korea	9–5 (3–2, 1–2, 5–1)	Hong Kong	Lakeside Ice Park, Santiago de Querétaro; Attendance: 63

Game reference

Kim Kang-gun
Goalies
Cheung Ching Ho
Referee:
(United States) Chazz Knoche
Linesmen:
(Mexico) Emilio Gómez
(South Africa) Jason van Rooyen

Pak Y. (PP) – 09:26	1–0
Han K. (Choe W.) – 10:48	2–0
	2–1	16:09 – Yam
Rim (Pak Y.) – 17:21	3–1
	3–2	19:45 – Zheng (Tang) (PP)
	3–3	28:52 – Tang (L. Wong)
	3–4	30:46 – L. Wong (Zheng, Tang)
Kim I. (Hong, Kim C.) (PP) – 33:12	4–4
Hong (Kim I.) (PP) – 40:53	5–4
Kim Ku. (Pak Y.) (PP) – 50:51	6–4
Rim (Kim Ku.) – 51:53	7–4
Kim I. – 54:31	8–4
	8–5	56:21 – Cheng
Kim Ku. – 57:14	9–5

29 min
Penalties
10 min
31
Shots
22

28 April 2025; 20:30	Mexico	9–1 (4–1, 3–0, 2–0)	Philippines	Lakeside Ice Park, Santiago de Querétaro; Attendance: 270

Game reference

Marcello de Antunano
Goalies
Gianpietro Iseppi
Referee:
(Canada) Dominic Cadieux
Linesmen:
(United States) Zachary Carson
(Spain) Aleix Espino

Majul (Hagerman, L. Valencia) (PP) – 09:22	1–0
A. Valencia (Hagerman, Apud) – 12:22	2–0
Oliver (Díaz, Apud) – 13:19	3–0
E. Valencia (Samperio, Ayala) – 14:02	4–0
	4–1	17:11 – Füglister (Tigaronita, Montano)
A. Valencia (E. Valencia, Ayala) (SH) – 24:58	5–1
A. Valencia (Rodríguez) – 30:19	6–1
Tapia (Hagerman, Majul) (PP) – 39:31	7–1
Majul (Díaz, Apud) – 58:54	8–1
Samperio (Tapia, Rullan) – 59:27	9–1

8 min
Penalties
10 min
56
Shots
15

30 April 2025; 13:00	North Korea	7–3 (3–2, 3–0, 1–1)	Mongolia	Lakeside Ice Park, Santiago de Querétaro; Attendance: 48

Game reference

Kim Kang-gun
Jong Kang-song
Goalies
Enkhkhuslen Enkh-Erdene
Sodbileg Baatarkhuu
Referee:
(Austria) Alexander Hlavaty
Linesmen:
(Spain) Aleix Espino
(Mexico) Óscar Pérez

	0–1	01:33 – Undarmaa (Davaanyam, Bataar)
Kim S. (Hong, Kim I.) – 03:32	1–1
Rim (Pak Y., Kim Ku.) – 06:59	2–1
	2–2	09:52 – Mishigsuren (Urtnasan, Batorovich) (PP)
Pak C. (Hong, Kim I.) – 11:08	3–2
Pak C. (Hong, Kim C.) – 26:59	4–2
Pak C. (Kim I., Ri Ui.) – 31:55	5–2
Pak C. (Kim I., Choe W.) – 38:50	6–2
Kim I. (Han K., Pak Y.) (SH) – 41:50	7–2
	7 –3	57:18 – Batorovich (Batbaatar, Urtnasan)

16 min
Penalties
14 min
30
Shots
36

30 April 2025; 16:30	Hong Kong	17–2 (6–1, 7–0, 4–1)	Philippines	Lakeside Ice Park, Santiago de Querétaro; Attendance: 94

Game reference

Cheung Ching Ho
Emerson Keung
Goalies
Gianpietro Iseppi
Irell Pérez
Referee:
(Turkey) Murat Aygün
Linesmen:
(United States) Zachary Carson
(Mexico) Sem Ramírez

Cheng (Mak) (PP) – 05:07	1–0
Mak (L. Wong) – 06:27	2–0
	2–1	07:39 – Füglister (Billones) (PP)
Fung (Yi, Cheng) – 08:54	3–1
Pang (Mak, L. Wong) (EA) – 12:52	4–1
Mak (Tang, L. Wong) – 14:36	5–1
Mak (Tang, L. Wong) – 19:24	6–1
Tang (Mak, L. Wong) – 21:34	7–1
Ngan (Cheng) – 25:37	8–1
Chau (Koo, Zheng) (EA) – 26:53	9–1
Tang (PP2, EA) – 29:43	10–1
Lee (Yam, Chau) (PP) – 30:10	11–1
Fung (Chau, Tang) (EA) – 33:22	12–1
Tang (L. Wong, Wong K.) – 38:52	13–1
	13–2	46:41 – Sze (Billones)
L. Wong (Tang) – 48:03	14–2
L. Wong (Mak) – 55:52	15–2
Cheng – 57:37	16–2
Pang (Yi, Law) (PP) – 58:49	17–2

10 min
Penalties
18 min
40
Shots
13

30 April 2025; 20:30	Mexico	18–1 (7–0, 6–0, 5–1)	Singapore	Lakeside Ice Park, Santiago de Querétaro; Attendance: 523

Game reference

Tomas Payro
Goalies
Joshua Lee
Referee:
(United States) Chazz Knoche
Linesmen:
(Spain) Luis Estirado Revuelta
(South Africa) Jason van Rooyen

E. Valencia (Ayala, Méndez) – 02:59	1–0
Tapia (L. Valencia, Majul) (PP) – 05:03	2–0
Majul (L. Valencia, Ayala) – 07:54	3–0
Rodríguez (Majul) (SH) – 11:29	4–0
Soto (E. Valencia) – 14:57	5–0
Soto (Tapia, Rodríguez) – 15:18	6–0
Tapia (A. Valencia) – 19:04	7–0
Majul (L. Valencia) – 20:46	8–0
A. Valencia (Tapia) – 21:41	9–0
Tapia – 28:18	10–0
Majul (L. Valencia) – 29:06	11–0
Hagerman (Apud, Ayala) – 34:09	12–0
Soto (Oliver) – 38:36	13–0
Majul (L. Valencia) – 44:55	14–0
Tapia (Rodríguez) – 45:34	15–0
	15–1	49:25 – Kodrowski (Tang)
Oliver (Apud, Díaz) – 56:35	16–1
L. Valencia (Ayala) – 59:11	17–1
Majul (Cuellar) – 59:35	18–1

4 min
Penalties
6 min
66
Shots
7

2 May 2025; 13:00	Singapore	0–11 (0–3, 0–4, 0–4)	Hong Kong	Lakeside Ice Park, Santiago de Querétaro; Attendance: 83

Game reference

Joshua Lee
David Lam
Goalies
Cheung Ching Ho
Referee:
(Turkey) Murat Aygün
Linesmen:
(United States) Zachary Carson
(Mexico) Emilio Gómez

0–1	12:11 – Cheng (Ngan, Lee)
0–2	14:34 – Wong K. (Tang, Mak)
0–3	16:58 – Tang (L. Wong)
0–4	27:56 – Wong K. (Tang, Lee) (PP)
0–5	29:05 – L. Wong
0–6	29:47 – Y. Wong (Ngan)
0–7	37:54 – Chau (Wong K., Wong W.)
0–8	43:16 – Ngan (Tang, Koo)
0–9	50:20 – Cheng (Ngan)
0–10	56:22 – Tang (PP)
0–11	59:00 – Cheng (Y. Wong)

16 min
Penalties
4 min
9
Shots
59

2 May 2025; 16:30	Philippines	5–6 OT (1–1, 2–3, 2–1) (OT: 0–1)	North Korea	Lakeside Ice Park, Santiago de Querétaro; Attendance: 95

Game reference

Gianpietro Iseppi
Goalies
Kim Kang-gun
Referee:
(Canada) Dominic Cadieux
Linesmen:
(Mexico) Óscar Pérez
(Mexico) Sem Ramírez

	0–1	05:55 – Pak Y. (Choe W.)
Sze (Regencia, Imperial) – 06:59	1–1
	1–2	24:18 – Choe W. (Han K.) (PP)
	1–3	33:53 – Han K.
Füglister (Sze, Regencia) – 34:13	2–3
Billones – 36:36	3–3
	3–4	38:54 – Rim (Pak Y., Han K.)
Füglister (Sze) – 54:07	4–4
	4–5	54:47 – Pak C. (Kim C.)
Crisostomo (Abis, Billones) (PP, EA) – 59:13	5–5
	5–6	61:13 – Pak Y. (Hong, Choe W.)

6 min
Penalties
8 min
20
Shots
42

2 May 2025; 20:30	Mongolia	6–7 (0–1, 2–3, 4–3)	Mexico	Lakeside Ice Park, Santiago de Querétaro; Attendance: 604

Game reference

Enkhkhuslen Enkh-Erdene
Sodbileg Baatarkhuu
Goalies
Alfonso de Alba
Referee:
(United States) Chazz Knoche
Linesmen:
(Spain) Aleix Espino
(Spain) Luis Estirado Revuelta

	0–1	06:37 – Majul (Cuellar)
Ankhbayar (Mishigsuren, Urtnasan) – 20:52	1–1
	1–2	27:47 – Hagerman (Cuellar)
	1–3	32:03 – A. Valencia (Soto)
	1–4	35:15 – Rodríguez (SH)
Ankhbayar (PP) – 35:45	2–4
Mishigsuren – 45:19	3–4
Batorovich (Mishigsuren) – 47:16	4–4
	4–5	51:42 – Hagerman (L. Valencia) (PP)
Boldbaatar (Batorovich) – 54:29	5–5
	5–6	56:47 – Majul (Cuellar)
	5–7	57:33 – Oliver (Soto, Díaz)
Undarmaa (Boldbaatar, Batbaatar) (EA) – 59:27	6–7

10 min
Penalties
10 min
22
Shots
36

3 May 2025; 13:00	Philippines	7–1 (1–0, 1–0, 5–1)	Singapore	Lakeside Ice Park, Santiago de Querétaro; Attendance: 94

Game reference

Gianpietro Iseppi
Goalies
Joshua Lee
Referee:
(United States) Chazz Knoche
Linesmen:
(Mexico) Emilio Gómez
(Mexico) Sem Ramírez

Abis (Regencia) – 15:09	1–0
Stern (Billones) – 29:32	2–0
Sze (Füglister) – 43:34	3–0
Imperial – 45:59	4–0
Billones (Füglister) (SH) – 50:45	5–0
	5–1	53:21 – O'Brien (Chua) (PP)
Füglister (Regencia) – 56:56	6–1
Sze (Regencia) – 57:19	7–1

8 min
Penalties
29 min
52
Shots
18

3 May 2025; 16:30	Hong Kong	7–3 (4–2, 0–1, 3–0)	Mongolia	Lakeside Ice Park, Santiago de Querétaro; Attendance: 157

Game reference

Cheung Ching Ho
Goalies
Sodbileg Baatarkhuu
Enkhkhuslen Enkh-Erdene
Referee:
(Austria) Alexander Hlavaty
Linesmen:
(Mexico) Óscar Pérez
(Spain) Luis Estirado Revuelta

	0–1	03:31 – Batbaatar (Ankhbayar, Batorovich)
L. Wong (Fung, Mak) – 05:25	1–1
	1–2	09:37 – Mishigsuren (Batbaatar, Urtnasan) (PP)
Tang (Yam) – 10:30	2–2
Cheng (Lee) (PP2) – 18:18	3–2
L. Wong (Mak, Tang) – 19:27	4–2
	4–3	34:49 – Batbaatar (Urtnasan, Ankhbayar) (PP)
Ngan (Cheng, Zheng) – 40:20	5–3
Cheng (Wong K., Zheng) – 46:32	6–3
Cheng (Yi, Lee) – 48:46	7–3

12 min
Penalties
6 min
36
Shots
25

3 May 2025; 20:30	Mexico	9–2 (3–0, 1–1, 5–1)	North Korea	Lakeside Ice Park, Santiago de Querétaro; Attendance: 764

Game reference

Alfonso de Alba
Goalies
Kim Kang-gun
Referee:
(Canada) Dominic Cadieux
Linesmen:
(United States) Zachary Carson
(Spain) Aleix Espino

Majul – 00:28	1–0
Samperio (Cuellar) – 06:04	2–0
Majul – 14:32	3–0
Méndez (Díaz) – 31:17	4–0
	4–1	35:17 – Kim Ku. (Han K.) (PP)
Majul (Hagerman, Cuellar) (PP) – 44:59	5–1
Tapia (L. Valencia, Rodríguez) – 47:31	6–1
	6–2	50:09 – Rim (Pak Y., Han K.)
Tapia (Majul) (PP) – 54:09	7–2
Tapia (L. Valencia, Cuellar) – 56:02	8–2
Hagerman (L. Valencia, Cuellar) – 58:38	9–2

8 min
Penalties
26 min
47
Shots
23

=== Statistics ===
==== Scoring leaders ====
List shows the top skaters sorted by points, then goals.

Player	GP	G	A	Pts	+/−	PIM	POS
(Mexico) Héctor Majul	5	15	5	20	+12	4	F
(Mongolia) Batu Gendunov	5	9	11	20	+2	6	D
(Hong Kong) Bryan Tang	5	8	10	18	+19	12	F
(Hong Kong) Lokel Wong	5	6	10	16	+14	4	F
(Hong Kong) Justin Cheng	5	10	4	14	+11	2	F
(Mongolia) Chinzolboo Mishigsuren	5	7	7	14	+10	4	F
(Mexico) Luis Valencia	5	2	12	14	+13	4	F
(Mexico) Angel Tapia	5	8	4	12	+9	8	F
(North Korea) Pak Yong-jo	5	5	6	11	+8	2	F
(Mongolia) Bilguun Ankhbayar	5	3	8	11	+6	2	F

GP = Games played; G = Goals; A = Assists; Pts = Points; +/− = Plus/Minus; PIM = Penalties in Minutes; POS = Position
Source: IIHF.com

==== Goaltending leaders ====
Only the top five goaltenders, based on save percentage, who have played at least 40% of their team's minutes, are included in this list.

Player	TOI	GA	GAA	SA	Sv%	SO
(Mongolia) Enkhkhuslen Enkh-Erdene	158:15	9	3.41	56	83.93	0
(Hong Kong) Cheung Ching Ho	266:13	16	3.61	93	82.80	0
(Mexico) Alfonso de Alba	180:00	10	3.33	57	82.46	0
(North Korea) Kim Kang-gun	261:13	22	5.05	120	81.67	0
(Singapore) Joshua Lee	300:00	61	12.20	270	77.41	0

TOI = time on ice (minutes:seconds); SA = shots against; GA = goals against; GAA = goals against average; Sv% = save percentage; SO = shutouts
Source: IIHF.com

=== Awards ===
Position	Player
Goaltender	(Mexico) Alfonso de Alba
Defenceman	(Mongolia) Batu Batorovich
Forward	(Mexico) Héctor Majul
