= Kamil Shiafotdinov =

Russian ice hockey player

- Born: October 3, 1994 (age 31) Moscow, Russia
- Height: 5 ft 10 in (178 cm)
- Weight: 172 lb (78 kg; 12 st 4 lb)
- Position: Centre
- Shoots: Left
- VHL team Former teams: Neftyanik Almetievsk; Atlant Moscow Oblast; KHL Medveščak Zagreb
- Playing career: 2014–present

Kamil Shiafotdinov (born October 3, 1994) is a Russian professional ice hockey centre. He is currently playing with Neftyanik Almetievsk of the Supreme Hockey League (VHL).

== Playing career ==
Despite being born in Russia, Shiafotdinov began his career in the Czech Republic with VHK Vsetín in 2011. Having returned to Russia in 2013, he made his Kontinental Hockey League debut playing with Atlant Moscow Oblast during the 2014–15 KHL season and went on to play five games for the team that season. He then played two games for Croatia-based team KHL Medveščak Zagreb the following season.

Shiafotdinov played the next three seasons in the VHL, with Tsen Tou Jilin City and Zauralie Kurgan before returning to the KHL by securing a try-out contract with Torpedo Nizhny Novgorod on 6 July 2020. He was later released and continued in the VHL with Neftyanik Almetievsk.
