= Hokkaido Grus =

- City: Nagoya, Japan
- League: XHL
- Founded: 2026
- Home arena: Kushiro Ice Arena (capacity: 2,539)
- Head coach: Hiroaki Kobayashi
- Website: website

The Hokkaido Grus is an ice hockey team based in Kushiro, Japan playing in the Extreme Ice Hockey League.

== History ==
The Hokkaido Grus began operations as a new team in May 2024 with the ambition of joining the Asia League Ice Hockey. Eventually management shifted its focus to joining the Extreme Ice Hockey League and joined for the 2026/2027 season. The club would fill the void in the region created by the disbandment of the Nippon Paper Cranes and the East Hokkaido Cranes. Players and management assembled for practice for the first time on 22 August 2026 with the club set to play its first-ever league matches on the 26th and 27th of the following month.
