= 2026 IIHF World Championship Division III =

Ice hockey world championships

Tournament details
- Host countries: South Africa; Hong Kong
- Venues: 2 (in 2 host cities)
- Dates: 13–19 April
- Teams: 12

The 2026 IIHF World Championship Division III consisted of two international ice hockey tournaments organized by the International Ice Hockey Federation. Divisions III A and III B represent the sixth and the seventh tier of the IIHF Ice Hockey World Championships.

Turkey won Group A and got promoted, while Turkmenistan was relegated. In Group B, Uzbekistan got the win and promoted.

== Group A tournament ==
2026 IIHF World Championship Division III A

Tournament details
- Host country: South Africa
- City: Cape Town
- Venue: 1 (in 1 host city)
- Dates: 13–19 April
- Teams: 6

Tournament statistics
- Games played: 15
- Goals scored: 125 (8.33 per game)
- Attendance: 2,660 (177 per game)
- Scoring leader: (Mexico) Héctor Majul (13 points)

Official website
- Website

The Division III Group A tournament was played in Cape Town, South Africa, from 13 to 19 April 2026.

=== Participating teams ===
Team	Qualification
Thailand	Placed 6th in Division II B in 2025 and were relegated.
Turkmenistan	Placed 2nd in Division III A in 2025.
Turkey	Placed 3rd in Division III A in 2025.
South Africa	Hosts; placed 4th in Division III A in 2025.
Bosnia and Herzegovina	Placed 5th in Division III A in 2025.
Mexico	Placed 1st in Division III B in 2025 and were promoted.

=== Match officials ===
Four referees and seven linesperson were selected for the tournament.

Referees	Linesman
(Kazakhstan) Anton Boryayev; (Latvia) Elvijs Trankalis; (New Zealand) Richard Button; (Sweden) Mikael Johansson	(Austria) Maximilian Gatol; (Belgium) Frederic Monnaie; (Denmark) Andreas Fuglsang; (Netherlands) Willem Gloudemans; (Slovakia) Matúš Stanzel; (South Africa) Jason von Rooyen; (Australia) Hamish Young

=== Standings ===
Pos	Team	Pld	W	OTW	OTL	L	GF	GA	GD	Pts	Promotion or relegation
1	Turkey	5	5	0	0	0	28	10	+18	15	Promotion to the 2027 Division II B
2	Mexico	5	2	1	1	1	26	20	+6	9	
3	Bosnia and Herzegovina	5	2	1	0	2	17	14	+3	8	
4	South Africa (H)	5	2	0	1	2	17	26	−9	7	
5	Thailand	5	1	1	0	3	18	29	−11	5	
6	Turkmenistan	5	0	0	1	4	19	26	−7	1	Relegation to the 2027 Division III B

Source: IIHF
Rules for classification: 1) points; 2) head-to-head points; 3) head-to-head goal difference; 4) head-to-head number of goals scored; 5) result against closest best-ranked team outside tied teams; 6) result against second-best ranked team outside tied teams; 7) seeding before tournament.
(H) Host

=== Results ===
All times are local (UTC+2).

13 April 2026; 13:00	Turkey	6–1 (1–0, 1–0, 4–1)	Thailand	Ice Station, Cape Town; Attendance: 20

Game reference

Sava Voronov
Goalies
Benjamin Kleineschay
Vijak Niyomvong
Referee:
(Sweden) Mikael Johansson
Linesmen:
(Belgium) Frederic Monnaie
(South Africa) Jason von Rooyen

F. Faner (PP) – 09:42	1–0
Bingöl (Çolak) – 33:02	2–0
Karakoç – 47:51	3–0
Karadağ (Demirdelen, Bakal) – 48:25	4–0
Çolak (Tayğar) – 49:44	5–0
Yavuz (Karş, F. Faner) – 50:13	6–0
	6–1	59:34 – Lampson (Kitayama) (PP)

14 min
Penalties
6 min
27
Shots
26

13 April 2026; 16:30	Turkmenistan	3–4 (1–3, 2–0, 0–1)	Bosnia and Herzegovina	Ice Station, Cape Town; Attendance: 50

Game reference

Keremli Charyyev
Goalies
Ivan Popov
Referee:
(Kazakhstan) Anton Boryayev
Linesmen:
(Slovakia) Matúš Stanzel
(Australia) Hamish Young

	0–1	05:41 – Gaković (Mrkva, Vučinić)
Vahovskiy (Baymyradov) – 07:36	1–1
	1–2	07:58 – Mrkva (Gaković)
	1–3	10:08 – Mlivić (Silajdžić)
Dovletmyradov (Vahitov, Kakabayev) – 36:04	2–3
Kakabayev (Dovletmyradov, Aganiyazov) – 39:02	3–3
	3–4	40:42 – Mlivić (Ćapin) (PP)

10 min
Penalties
8 min
36
Shots
29

13 April 2026; 20:00	Mexico	5–4 OT (2–0, 1–2, 1–2) (OT: 1–0)	South Africa	Ice Station, Cape Town; Attendance: 300

Game reference

Alfonso de Alba
Goalies
Ryan Boyd
Referee:
(Latvia) Elvijs Trankalis
Linesmen:
(Austria) Maximilian Gatol
(Netherlands) Willem Gloudemans

Majul (Cuellar) – 02:56	1–0
Majul (Cuellar, L. Valencia) – 13:43	2–0
	2–1	26:21 – Van der Merwe (Bremner, Kluyts)
	2–2	32:29 – Bate (Kluyts)
Chavez (Apud, Gamez) – 33:44	3–2
	3–3	40:57 – Van Doesburgh (Magmoed, Samaai)
	3–4	42:44 – Van der Merwe (Phakathi, Kluyts)
Majul (PP, EA) – 58:37	4–4
L. Valencia (Majul, Wilson) – 62:00	5–4

10 min
Penalties
6 min
31
Shots
32

14 April 2026; 13:00	Turkmenistan	4–6 (2–2, 0–2, 2–2)	Turkey	Ice Station, Cape Town; Attendance: 20

Game reference

Keremli Charyyev
Goalies
Sava Voronov
Referee:
(New Zealand) Richard Button
Linesmen:
(Denmark) Andreas Fuglsang
(Netherlands) Willem Gloudemans

Baylyyev (Bayhanov, Baymyradov) – 01:10	1–0
	1–1	07:22 – F. Faner (Karş, Karadağ)
Doyletmyradov (Annasaparov, Aganiyazov) – 08:37	2–1
	2–2	16:59 Demirdelen (Bakal, Karş)
	2–3	29:27 – Tayğar (Bingöl, Karş)
	2–4	34:22 – Demirdelen (E. Faner, Karş)
	2–5	48:47 – Bakal (Bingöl, F. Faner) (PP)
Dovletmyradov (Vahitov, Annasaparov) – 56:40	3–5
Aganiyazov (Annasaparov, Dovletmyradov) – 58:43	4–5
	4–6	59:52 – Çolak (EN)

6 min
Penalties
33 min
29
Shots
32

14 April 2026; 16:30	Bosnia and Herzegovina	4–3 OT (1–1, 2–2, 0–0) (OT: 1–0)	Mexico	Ice Station, Cape Town; Attendance: 50

Game reference

Ivan Popov
Goalies
Alfonso de Alba
Tomas Payro
Referee:
(Sweden) Mikael Johansson
Linesmen:
(Belgium) Frederic Monnaie
(Slovakia) Matúš Stanzel

	0–1	03:39 – L. Valencia (Majul, Cuellar)
Ćapin (Vulović, Gaković) (PP) – 06:09	1–1
	1–2	20:53 – L. Valencia (Rodríguez, Rullan)
Drnda (Silajdžić, Smajlović) – 27:13	2–2
	2–3	28:10 – Rullan (Majul)
Mlivić (Silajdžić) – 32:14	3–3
Gaković (Mlivić) (PP) – 64:37	4–3

4 min
Penalties
26 min
33
Shots
31

14 April 2026; 20:00	Thailand	7–3 (2–1, 2–0, 3–2)	South Africa	Ice Station, Cape Town; Attendance: 250

Game reference

Benjamin Kleineschay
Goalies
Ryan Boyd
Ruan van der Merwe
Referee:
(Kazakhstan) Anton Boryayev
Linesmen:
(Austria) Maximilian Gatol
(Australia) Hamish Young

Pataramasakul (Kulrat) – 08:19	1–0
	1–1	10:52 – Bremner (Verwey)
Kitayama (Forstner) (PP) – 16:25	2–1
Kulthanthorn (Khuhakaew) – 30:40	3–1
Kitayama (Vatanapanyakul) – 37:00	4–1
	4–2	49:22 – Levi (Bate)
Lampson (Nagayama, Kitayam) – 52:11	5–2
Kulthanthorn (Forstner, Kitayama) (PP) – 54:41	6–2
	6–3	57:37 – Krotz (Obery)
Hongswadhi (Sakchaicharoenkul) – 59:33	7–3

6 min
Penalties
6 min
30
Shots
43

16 April 2026; 13:00	Thailand	2–5 (1–2, 1–1, 0–2)	Bosnia and Herzegovina	Ice Station, Cape Town; Attendance: 20

Game reference

Benjamin Kleineschay
Goalies
Ivan Popov
Referee:
(Latvia) Elvijs Trankalis
Linesmen:
(Denmark) Andreas Fuglsang
(Netherlands) Willem Gloudemans

	0–1	06:20 – Mlivić (Silajdžić)
Forstner (Kitayama) – 11:31	1–1
	1–2	12:18 – Smajlović (Pleho)
	1–3	23:19 – Mlivić
Kitayama (Vatanapanyakul, Benjamin Kleineschay) (PP) – 32:00	2–3
	2–4	58:14 – Smajlović (EN)
	2–5	59:14 – Gaković (Filipović) (EN)

4 min
Penalties
10 min
37
Shots
42

16 April 2026; 16:30	Turkmenistan	4–5 (2–1, 1–2, 1–2)	Mexico	Ice Station, Cape Town; Attendance: 50

Game reference

Alfonso de Alba
Goalies
Keremli Charyyev
Referee:
(New Zealand) Richard Button
Linesmen:
(South Africa) Jason von Rooyen
(Australia) Hamish Young

Dovletmyradov (Aganiyazov, Kakabayev) (PP) – 00:43	1–0
Baymyradov (Vahovskiy, Baylyyev) – 13:57	2–0
	2–1	17:47 – Majul (L. Valencia)
Vahovskiy (Kakajanov, Baylyyev) – 28:05	3–1
	3–2	34:49 L. Valencia (Rullan, A. Valencia) (PP2)
	3–3	35:12 – Rullan (L. Valencia, Majul) (PP2)
	3–4	50:54 – A. Valencia (Majul)
	3–5	54:53 – Soto Borja
Aganiyazov (Vahovskiy, Vahitov)	4–5

44 min
Penalties
6 min
24
Shots
35

16 April 2026; 20:00	Turkey	8–1 (3–0, 3–0, 2–1)	South Africa	Ice Station, Cape Town; Attendance: 400

Game reference

Sava Voronov
Goalies
Ruan van der Merwe
Ryan Boyd
Referee:
(Kazakhstan) Anton Boryayev
Linesmen:
(Belgium) Frederic Monnaie
(Slovakia) Matúš Stanzel

Bakal (Karadağ) – 04:53	1–0
Savaş (Bingöl, Çolak) – 05:37	2–0
Savaş (Bakal, Karadağ) – 12:46	3–0
Karş (Karakoç, Tınaz) (SH) – 29:46	4–0
Bakal (Karadağ, Tayğar) (PP) – 33:27	5–0
Karakoç (Tınaz) – 39:50	6–0
	6–1	45:56 – Carelse (Samaai, Van Doesburgh)
İnandı (Yavuz, Uzunali) – 53:48	7–1
Bakal (Karadağ) – 57:01	8–1

2 min
Penalties
6 min
32
Shots
25

17 April 2026; 13:00	Mexico	10–2 (2–1, 6–0, 2–1)	Thailand	Ice Station, Cape Town; Attendance: 30

Game reference

Alfonso de Alba
Tomas Payro
Goalies
Benjamin Kleineschay
Vijak Niyomvong
Referee:
(New Zealand) Richard Button
Linesmen:
(South Africa) Jason von Rooyen
(Australia) Hamish Young

L. Valencia (Rullan) (PP) – 03:13	1–0
Cuellar (Rodríguez, Rullan) – 11:54	2–0
	2–1	18:43 – Thongin (Pataramasakul)
Chavez (Tapia, Ayala) – 21:42	3–1
A. Valencia (L. Valencia) – 21:58	4–1
L. Valencia (Majul, A. Valencia) – 23:59	5–1
Tapia (Ripstein, Cuellar) – 25:54	6–1
Majul – 33:53	7–1
Tapia (Cuellar, Ugarte) – 35:57	8–1
Majul (A. Valencia) – 44:00	9–1
	9–2	46:35 – Khuhakaew (Sakchaicharoenkul, Sukwiboon)
A. Valencia (Majul) – 57:14	10–2

4 min
Penalties
4 min
38
Shots
31

17 April 2026; 16:30	Bosnia and Herzegovina	1–2 (1–1, 0–0, 0–1)	Turkey	Ice Station, Cape Town; Attendance: 50

Game reference

Ivan Popov
Goalies
Sava Voronov
Referee:
(Sweden) Mikael Johansson
Linesmen:
(Austria) Maximilian Gatol
(Slovakia) Matúš Stanzel

	0–1	16:25 – Çolak (Tayğar, Bingöl)
Silajdžić (Vučinić, Filipović) – 17:19	1–1
	1–2	42:23 – Karakoç (Çolak, Kabay)

6 min
Penalties
31 min
31
Shots
49

17 April 2026; 20:00	South Africa	5–3 (3–1, 0–2, 2–0)	Turkmenistan	Ice Station, Cape Town; Attendance: 700

Game reference

Ryan Boyd
Goalies
Keremli Charyyev
Referee:
(Latvia) Elvijs Trankalis
Linesmen:
(Denmark) Andreas Fuglsang
(Netherlands) Willem Gloudemans

Carelse (Samaai, Van Doesburgh) – 00:37	1–0
Bate (Obery) – 11:51	2–0
Van der Merwe (Kluyts, Bremner) – 13:37	3–0
	3–1	17:09 – Bayjayev (Aganiyazov, Annasaparov) (PP)
	3–2	36:06 – Bayjayev (Vahovskiy, Annasaparov)
	3–3	37:01 – Bayhanov (Vahitov, Baymyradov)
Samaai (Verwey) – 58:55	4–3
Samaai (Bate) (EN) – 59:45	5–3

10 min
Penalties
6 min
37
Shots
45

19 April 2026; 13:00	Turkey	6–3 (3–2, 2–1, 1–0)	Mexico	Ice Station, Cape Town; Attendance: 50

Game reference

Sava Voronov
Goalies
Alfonso de Alba
Referee:
(Sweden) Mikael Johansson
Linesmen:
(Belgium) Frederic Monnaie
(Slovakia) Matúš Stanzel

Bakal (Karadağ) – 04:53	1–0
	1–1	05:17 – Ripstein (Ugarte, L. Valencia)
İnandı (Girgin) – 05:44	2–1
	2–2	10:01 – Ayala (Rodríguez)
Uzunali (E. Faner, Demirdelen) (PP) – 12:48	3–2
Demirdelen (Tayğar, Uzunali) – 28:25	4–2
	4–3	29:03 – L. Valencia
Bakal (Karadağ, Demirdelen) – 39:44	5–3
İnandı (Yavuz) – 41:28	6–3

42 min
Penalties
50 min
43
Shots
28

19 April 2026; 16:30	Thailand	6–5 GWS (2–2, 2–1, 1–2) (OT: 1–0) (SO: 1–0)	Turkmenistan	Ice Station, Cape Town; Attendance: 70

Game reference

Benjamin Kleineschay
Goalies
Keremli Charyyev
Referee:
(Kazakhstan) Anton Boryayev
Linesmen:
(Denmark) Andreas Fuglsang
(South Africa) Jason von Rooyen

Kulthanthorn (Lampson, Vatanapanyakul) – 05:50	1–0
	1–1	06:31 – Baylyyev (Bayhanov, Baymyradov)
	1–2	07:41 – Kakajanov (Bayjayev)
Lampson (Nagayama, Forstner) (PP) – 10:28	2–2
Forstner (Thongin, Khuhakaew) – 27:24	3–2
	3–3	28:41 – Bayjayev (Durdyyev)
Kitayama (Lampson, Kulthanthorn) – 33:22	4–3
	4–4	40:56 – Dovletmyradov (Vahitov, Vahovskiy)
Kulthanthorn (Nagayama, Lampson) – 52:00	5–4
	5–5	56:39 – Durdyyev

Kitayama
Nagayama (miss)
Kulthanthorn
Forstner
Shootout
Bayjayev
(miss) Dovletmyradov
(miss) Aganiyazov
(miss) Barkovskiy
6 min
Penalties
35 min
37
Shots
43

19 April 2026; 20:00	South Africa	4–3 (1–0, 2–2, 1–1)	Bosnia and Herzegovina	Ice Station, Cape Town; Attendance: 600

Game reference

Ryan Boyd
Goalies
Ivan Popov
Referee:
(Latvia) Elvijs Trankalis
Linesmen:
(Austria) Maximilian Gatol
(Australia) Hamish Young

Van der Merwe (Kluyts) – 07:57	1–0
	1–1	26:21 – Silajdžić (Mlivić, Vulović)
	1–2	33:58 – Ćapin (Silajdžić, Viden)
Kluyts (Phakathi, Van der Merwe) – 35:57	2–2
Kamish – 37:19	3–2
	3–3	43:02 – Silajdžić (Mlivić)
Obery (Krotz, Compton) – 54:40	4–3

8 min
Penalties
4 min
31
Shots
32

=== Statistics ===
==== Scoring leaders ====
List shows the top skaters sorted by points, then goals.

Player	GP	G	A	Pts	+/−	PIM	POS
(Mexico) Héctor Majul	5	6	7	13	+10	24	F
(Mexico) Luis Valencia	5	7	5	12	+9	14	F
(Turkey) Ferhat Bakal	5	6	3	9	+7	0	F
(Bosnia and Herzegovina) Adnan Mlivić	5	5	3	8	+5	2	F
(Thailand) Masato Kitayama	5	4	4	8	−6	4	F
(Bosnia and Herzegovina) Jakub Silajdžić	5	3	5	8	+5	8	F
(Turkey) Mehmet Karadağ	5	1	7	8	+7	0	F
(Turkmenistan) Begench Dovletmyradov	5	5	2	7	+4	25	F
(Turkey) Osman Çolak	5	3	3	6	+3	0	F
(Turkey) Bertan Demirdelen	5	3	3	6	+8	20	F
(Thailand) Nicholas Lampson	5	3	3	6	−7	0	F
(Mexico) Alexander Valencia	5	3	3	6	+6	2	F

GP = Games played; G = Goals; A = Assists; Pts = Points; +/− = Plus/Minus; PIM = Penalties in Minutes; POS = Position
Source: IIHF.com

==== Goaltending leaders ====
Only the top five goaltenders, based on save percentage, who have played at least 40% of their team's minutes, are included in this list.

Player	TOI	GA	GAA	SA	Sv%	SO
(Turkey) Sava Voronov	300:00	10	2.00	139	92.81	0
(Bosnia and Herzegovina) Ivan Popov	301:29	14	2.79	184	92.49	0
(Mexico) Alfonso de Alba	285:35	19	3.99	152	87.50	0
(South Africa) Ryan Boyd	242:58	18	4.45	137	86.86	0
(Thailand) Benjamin Kleineschay	260:17	22	5.07	167	86.83	0

TOI = time on ice (minutes:seconds); SA = shots against; GA = goals against; GAA = goals against average; Sv% = save percentage; SO = shutouts
Source: IIHF.com

=== Awards ===
Position	Player
Goaltender	(Turkey) Sava Voronov
Defenceman	(Turkey) Yusuf Karş
Forward	(Mexico) Héctor Majul

== Group B tournament ==
2026 IIHF World Championship Division III B

Tournament details
- Host country: Hong Kong
- Venue: 1 (in 1 host city)
- Dates: 13–19 April
- Teams: 6

Tournament statistics
- Games played: 15
- Goals scored: 215 (14.33 per game)
- Attendance: 3,457 (230 per game)
- Scoring leader: (Uzbekistan) Vadim Kravchenko (35 points)

Official website
- Website

The Division III Group B tournament was played in Hong Kong from 13 to 19 April 2026. No team was relegated because of the cancellation of the Division IV tournament.

=== Participating teams ===
Team	Qualification
Luxembourg	Placed 6th in Division III A in 2025 and were relegated.
North Korea	Placed 2nd in Division III B in 2025.
Hong Kong	Hosts; placed 3rd in Division III B in 2025.
Mongolia	Placed 4th in Division III B in 2025.
Philippines	Placed 5th in Division III B in 2025.
Uzbekistan	Placed 1st in Division IV in 2025 and were promoted.

=== Match officials ===
Four referees and seven linesperson were selected for the tournament.

Referees	Linesman
(Chinese Taipei) Shen Yen-chin; (Netherlands) Nicolaas van Grinsven; (Spain) Carlos Trobajo; (Thailand) Aomsin Ubolluck	(Australia) Nicholas Air; (Chinese Taipei) Hung Chi-lun; (Croatia) Tomislav Grozaj; (Hong Kong) Chan Ka Hei; (Singapore) Benjaming Huang; (Singapore) Michael Loh; (Slovakia) Miroslav Tvrdoň

=== Standings ===
Pos	Team	Pld	W	OTW	OTL	L	GF	GA	GD	Pts	Promotion
1	Uzbekistan	5	5	0	0	0	97	11	+86	15	Promotion to the 2027 Division III A
2	North Korea	5	4	0	0	1	28	32	−4	12	
3	Hong Kong (H)	5	3	0	0	2	35	20	+15	9	
4	Luxembourg	5	2	0	0	3	13	33	−20	6	
5	Mongolia	5	1	0	0	4	27	56	−29	3	
6	Philippines	5	0	0	0	5	15	63	−48	0	

Source: IIHF
Rules for classification: 1) points; 2) head-to-head points; 3) head-to-head goal difference; 4) head-to-head number of goals scored; 5) result against closest best-ranked team outside tied teams; 6) result against second-best ranked team outside tied teams; 7) seeding before tournament.
(H) Host

=== Results ===
All times are local (UTC+8).

13 April 2026; 13:00	Uzbekistan	26–1 (11–0, 7–1, 8–0)	Mongolia	DB Ice Rink, Hong Kong; Attendance: 103

Game reference

Daniel Muratov
Rustam Irgashev
Goalies
Munkhbold Bayarsaikhan
Sodbileg Baatarkhuu
Referee:
(Netherlands) Nicolaas van Grinsven
Linesmen:
(Australia) Nicholas Air
(Hong Kong) Chan Ka Hei

Kravchenko (Nazarevich) – 04:24	1–0
Golubovich (Kogan, Khabibov) – 04:36	2–0
Khusanboev (Tillyakhodjaev, Azimov) – 04:48	3–0
Dorofeev (Kravchenko, Kogan) (PP) – 11:15	4–0
Tillyakhodjaev (Dadakhodjaev, Azimov) – 11:45	5–0
Rasulov (Nazarevich, Petrosyan) – 13:32	6–0
Jilov (Kravchenko, Kogan) – 13:40	7–0
Jilov (Dorofeev, Kravchenko) – 14:35	8–0
Kogan (Rustamkhonov, Sultanov) – 17:01	9–0
Sinyavskiy (Khusanboev, Rasulov) – 17:27	10–0
Kravchenko (Dadakhodjaev, Nazarevich) – 19:02	11–0
Azimov (Rustamkhovov) – 27:10	12–0
Kravchenko (Khabibov) – 29:43	13–0
Petrosyan (Azimov, Dadakhodjaev) – 31:52	14–0
Tillyakhodjaev (Kogan) – 32:43	15–0
	15–1	33:59 – Naranbaatar (Ankhbayar, Gendunov)
Rustamkhonov – 36:30	16–1
Jilov (Dorofeev, Petrosyan) – 38:31	17–1
Sinyavskiy (Rasulov, Nazarevich) – 39:56	18–1
Nazarevich (Golubovich) – 41:38	19–1
Azimov (Kogan, Khabibov) – 42:57	20–1
Maltsev – 43:48	21–1
Azimov (Khusanboev, Maltsev) – 47:22	22–1
Sinyavskiy (Rasulov) – 51:08	23–1
Kravchenko (Sinyavskiy) (SH) – 54:10	24–1
Rustamkhovov (Dadakhodjaev, Azimov) – 56:49	25–1
Maltsev (Rasulov, Sinyavskiy) – 59:20	26–1

2 min
Penalties
2 min
78
Shots
21

13 April 2026; 16:30	North Korea	8–2 (3–1, 2–1, 3–0)	Philippines	DB Ice Rink, Hong Kong; Attendance: 171

Game reference

Kim Kang-gun
Jong Kang-song
Goalies
Francois Gautier
Referee:
(Chinese Taipei) Hung Chi-lun
Linesmen:
(Croatia) Tomislav Grozaj
(Singapore) Benjaming Huang

Han K. (Rim, Pak C.) (PP) – 03:50	1–0
	1–1	05:26 – Füglister (C. Cremonese, T. Cremonese)
Han K. (Choe W.) – 06:06	2–1
Hwang (Kim I., Pak Y.) – 12:44	3–1
Ryu (Kim Kw., Kim Ku.) – 33:46	4–1
Rim – 35:18	5–1
	5–2	37:09 – Regencia (T. Cremonese, Billones)
Pa C. (Choe) – 46:13	6–2
Kim Ku. (Kim Kw., Jong S.) – 55:17	7–2
Rim (Ho, Choe) – 55:47	8–2

2 min
Penalties
6 min
40
Shots
25

13 April 2026; 20:00	Hong Kong	7–1 (3–0, 2–0, 2–1)	Luxembourg	DB Ice Rink, Hong Kong; Attendance: 316

Game reference

Rexton Chui
Goalies
Jesse Barbadillo
Referee:
(Spain) Carlos Trobajo
Linesmen:
(Chinese Taipei) Hung Chi-lun
(Slovakia) Miroslav Tvrdoň

Wang (Lee) – 10:36	1–0
Zheng (Wong W., Yam Yi) – 11:06	2–0
Tang (Chu, Choi) – 14:03	3–0
Tang (Chu) – 27:23	4–0
Tang (Shum) (SH) – 32:32	5–0
	5–1	44:37 – Cannon (Thomas)
Zheng (Tang) – 51:19	6–1
Shum (Lee, Ngan) (PP) – 53:33	7–1

6 min
Penalties
8 min
41
Shots
30

14 April 2026; 13:00	Philippines	3–28 (1–6, 1–12, 1–10)	Uzbekistan	DB Ice Rink, Hong Kong; Attendance: 105

Game reference

Euan Samaniego
Francois Gautier
Goalies
Rustam Irgashev
Daniel Muratov
Referee:
(Chinese Taipei) Shen Yen-chin
Linesmen:
(Singapore) Benjamin Huang
(Slovakia) Miroslav Tvrdoň

Füglister (T. Cremonese) – 02:55	1–0
	1–1	03:23 – Jilov (Nazarevich, Dorofeev)
	1–2	05:36 – Rustamkhonov (Maltsev, Dadakhodjaev)
	1–3	07:54 – Kravchenko (Maltsev, Jilov)
	1–4	08:26 – Golubovich (Rasulov, Malstev)
	1–5	13:24 – Kravchenko (Dorofeev, Jilov)
	1–6	18:39 – Dorofeev (Jilov, Nazarevich)
	1–7	21:44 – Nazarevich (Rasulov, Sinyavskiy)
	1–8	26:18 – Golubovich (Kravchenko, Khusanboev)
	1–9	26:52 – Sinyavskiy (Rasulov, Nazarevich)
	1–10	27:14 – Golubovich (Sinyavskiy, Petrosyan)
	1–11	28:04 – Dadakhodjaev (Rustamkhonov, Khabibov)
Billones (Regencia) – 32:05	2–11
	2–12	32:40 – Tillyakhodjaev (Nasirov, Sultanov)
	2–13	33:05 – Dorofeev (Kravchenko, Jilov)
	2–14	35:13 – Sinyavskiy (Raslov, Kogan)
	2–15	36:16 – Sinyavskiy (Maltsev, Jilov) (PP)
	2–16	38:35 – Kravchenko (Jilov, Dorofeev)
	2–17	39:07 – Golubovich (Sinyavskiy, Jilov)
	2–18	39:43 – Sinyavskiy (Golubovich, Rasulov)
	2–19	43:26 – Dadakhodjaev
	2–20	44:59 – Tillyakhodjaev
	2–21	45:23 – Kravchenko (Dorofeev)
	2–22	46:19 – Nazarevich (Jilov, Kravchenko)
	2–23	47:31 – Rasulov (Golubovich, Sinyavskiy)
	2–24	50:53 – Dorofeev (Kravchenko, Jilov)
	2–25	51:06 – Jilov (Dorofeev, Kravchenko)
	2–26	51:44 – Sinyavskiy (Rasulov)
	2–27	52:47 – Rasulov (Sinyavskiy, Golubovich)
	2–28	54:18 – Dadakhodjaev (Azimov, Rustamkhonov)
C. Cremonese (Füglister, T. Cremonese) – 54:29	3–28

4 min
Penalties
4 min
17
Shots
79

14 April 2026; 16:30	Luxembourg	7–5 (1–2, 5–1, 1–2)	Mongolia	DB Ice Rink, Hong Kong; Attendance: 89

Game reference

Jesse Barbadillo
Goalies
Munkhbold Bayarsaikhan
Sodbileg Baatarkhuu
Referee:
(Thailand) Aomsin Ubolluck
Linesmen:
(Hong Kong) Chan Ka Hei
(Croatia) Tomislav Grozaj

	0–1	12:25 – Mishigsuren (Batorovich, Undarmaa)
Cannon (Cap, Thomas) – 15:28	1–1
	1–2	16:08 – Mishigsuren
Fleischmann (Toft) – 22:42	2–2
Toft (Fleischmann, Nunes) – 27:27	3–2
Vass (Church, Springer) – 28:26	4–2
	4–3	33:29 – Batorovich
Vass – 36:35	5–3
Cannon (Zrika, Cap) – 36:51	6–3
	6–4	43:49 – Batorovich (Mishigsuren, Undarmaa) (PP)
	6–5	45:06 – Batsaikhan (Ider)
Stroppolo (Beran) – 57:05	7–5

10 min
Penalties
2 min
43
Shots
48

14 April 2026; 20:00	North Korea	4–3 (1–2, 2–0, 1–1)	Hong Kong	DB Ice Rink, Hong Kong; Attendance: 316

Game reference

Kim Kang-gun
Goalies
Rexton Chui
Referee:
(Netherlands) Nicolaas van Grinsven
Linesmen:
(Australia) Nicholas Air
(Singapore) Michael Loh

	0–1	00:19 – Tang (Chu)
	0–2	05:04 – Wang (Chu)
Ho (Jong T., Kim Kw.) – 12:26	1–2
Kim I. (Hwang) – 29:46	2–2
Kim Kw. (Kim Ku.) – 33:59	3–2
Pak Y. (Choe C., Hwang) – 41:22	4–2
	4–3	59:41 – Wong W. (Lee, Wat)

10 min
Penalties
35 min
46
Shots
22

16 April 2026; 13:00	North Korea	3–20 (1–6, 1–8, 1–6)	Uzbekistan	DB Ice Rink, Hong Kong; Attendance: 95

Game reference

Kim Kang-gun
Jong Kang-song
Goalies
Daniel Muratov
Referee:
(Thailand) Aomsin Ubolluck
Linesmen:
(Croatia) Tomislav Grozaj
(Chinese Taipei) Hung Chi-lun

	0–1	01:13 – Rasulov (Sinyavskiy)
	0–2	03:04 – Khabibov (Azimov)
	0–3	06:09 – Rustamkhonov
	0–4	11:07 – Kravchenko (Sinyavskiy, Maltsev) (PP)
Pak C. (Choe W., Rim) – 14:38	1–4
	1–5	15:04 – Sinyavskiy (Rasulov)
	1–6	16:22 – Rustamkhonov (Rasulov) (PP)
	1–7	21:05 – Dorofeev (Kravchenko, Jilov)
	1–8	26:00 – Kravchenko (Rasulov, Jilov)
	1–9	26:34 – Sinyavskiy (Golubovich, Rasulov)
	1–10	28:26 – Dorofeev (Kravchenko, Jilov) (PP)
	1–11	31:43 – Sinyavskiy (Maltsev, Dorofeev)
	1–12	32:36 – Golubovich (Rasulov, Sinyavskiy)
	1–13	33:21 – Sultanov (Tillyakhodjaev, Kogan)
Kim Kw. (Kim Ku., Jong S.) – 38:34	2–13
	2–14	39:17 – Dorofeev (Nazarevich, Jilov)
	2–15	41:22 – Dorofeev (Kravchenko, Sinyavskiy) (PP)
	2–16	42:09 – Jilov (Dorofeev, Kravchenko)
	2–17	42:23 – Golubovich (Nazarevich, Khusanboev)
	2–18	46:47 – Kravchenko (Nazarevich, Jilov)
	2–19	47:24 – Golubovich (Rasulov, Kogan)
	2–20	57:39 – Jilov (Nazarevich, Muratov)
Rim (Choe C., Pak K.) – 59:49	3–20

10 min
Penalties
0 min
29
Shots
53

16 April 2026; 16:30	Luxembourg	4–2 (0–1, 3–0, 1–1)	Philippines	DB Ice Rink, Hong Kong; Attendance: 187

Game reference

Jesse Barbadillo
Goalies
Francois Gautier
Referee:
(Netherlands) Nicolaas van Grinsven
Linesmen:
(Hong Kong) Chan Ka Hei
(Singapore) Michael Loh

	0–1	19:25 – Füglister (Billones) (PP)
Church (Thomas) – 27:12	1–1
Church (Stroppolo, Beran) (PP) – 36:29	2–1
Nunes (Springer) – 37:57	3–1
	3–2	46:52 – Füglister (C. Cremonese, T. Cremonese) (PP, EN)
Mossong (Stroppolo, Cannon) (PP) – 52:30	4–2

8 min
Penalties
10 min
40
Shots
29

16 April 2026; 20:00	Hong Kong	11–2 (3–1, 2–0, 7–1)	Mongolia	DB Ice Rink, Hong Kong; Attendance: 290

Game reference

Hoi Hei Fung
Goalies
Munkhbold Bayarsaikhan
Sodbileg Baatarkhuu
Referee:
(Spain) Carlos Trobajo
Linesmen:
(Australia) Nicholas Air
(Singapore) Benjaming Huang

Cheng (Zheng) – 03:46	1–0
Wong W. (Shum, Tang) (PP)	2–0
	2–1	17:23 – Mishigsuren (Purevdavaa, Ankhbayar)
Tang (Cheng, Chu) (PP) – 18:32	3–1
Tang (PS) – 25:56	4–1
Yam Yau (Lee, Ngan) (PP) – 37:45	5–1
Tang – 40:16	6–1
Ngan (Shum, Wong W) (PP) – 41:34	7–1
Tang (Chu) (PP) – 43:18	8–1
Wat (Zheng, Ngan) – 44:36	9–1
Chu – 49:29	10–1
Chu (Wat, Tang) (PP) – 51:11	11–1
	11–2	57:17 – Mishigsuren (Undarmaa, Purevdorj)

20 min
Penalties
35 min
46
Shots
45

17 April 2026; 13:00	Uzbekistan	14–0 (3–0, 3–0, 8–0)	Luxembourg	DB Ice Rink, Hong Kong; Attendance: 85

Game reference

Daniel Muratov
Rustam Irgashev
Goalies
Jesse Barbadillo
Sven Cruchten
Referee:
(Spain) Carlos Trobajo
Linesmen:
(Australia) Nicholas Air
(Singapore) Michael Loh

Rasulov (Golubovich, Sinyavskiy) – 01:29	1–0
Rustamkhonov – 08:21	2–0
Maltsev (Kravchenko, Dorofeev) – 16:10	3–0
Dorofeev (Kravchenko, Jilov) (PP) – 31:26	4–0
Kravchenko (Jilov, Maltsev) (PP) – 36:21	5–0
Rasulov (Dadakhodjaev, Kogan) (PP) – 38:45	6–0
Nazarevich (Rasulov, Golubovich) – 42:16	7–0
Jilov (Kravchenko, Sinyavskiy) (PP) – 44:29	8–0
Kravchenko (Sinyavskiy, Jilov) – 48:25	9–0
Nazarevich – 49:38	10–0
Rasulov (Golubovich, Khabibov) – 49:52	11–0
Kravchenko (Sinyavskiy) (SH) – 54:39	12–0
Maltsev (Rasulov) (SH) – 55:48	13–0
Rustamkhonov (Azimov, Nazarevich) – 57:38	14–0

2 min
Penalties
12 min
54
Shots
9

17 April 2026; 16:30	Mongolia	6–8 (1–3, 3–3, 2–2)	North Korea	DB Ice Rink, Hong Kong; Attendance: 138

Game reference

Munkhbold Bayarsaikhan
Goalies
Kim Kang-gun
Referee:
(Chinese Taipei) Shen Yen-chin
Linesmen:
(Hong Kong) Chan Ka Hei
(Slovakia) Miroslav Tvrdoň

	0–1	02:41 – Pak C. (Rim)
	0–2	06:05 – Ri (Kim I., Pak K.)
Purevdavaa (Batorovich) – 09:58	1–2
	1–3	12:29 – Kim Kw. (Han I., Kim Ku.)
Naranbaatar (Ankhbayar, Mishigsuren) (PP) – 22:52	2–3
Mishigsuren (Batorovich, Ider) (PP) – 24:24	3–3
	3–4	26:38 – Pak C. (Kim C.) (SH)
	3–5	28:04 – Kim Ki. (Pak K.)
Naranbaatar (Batorovich, Davaanyam) – 37:01	4–5
	4–6	39:36 – Han I. (Kim Kw., Kim Ku.)
Baatarkhuu (Batorovich) – 47:16	5–6
	5–7	52:34 – Pak Y. (Hwang, Pak K.)
Batorovich (Mishigsuren) – 55:52	6–7
	6–8	59:59 – Pak Y. (Kim I., Pak K.) (SH, EN)

4 min
Penalties
29 min
36
Shots
48

17 April 2026; 20:00	Philippines	4–10 (1–2, 2–6, 1–2)	Hong Kong	DB Ice Rink, Hong Kong; Attendance: 450

Game reference

Francois Gautier
Goalies
Rexton Chui
Referee:
(Thailand) Aomsin Ubolluck
Linesmen:
(Croatia) Tomislav Grozaj
(Chinese Taipei) Hung Chi-lun

Crisostomo (T. Cremonese, Billones) – 01:43	1–0
	1–1	04:27 – Wat (Cheng, Ngan)
	1–2	12:47 – Yam (Tang, Choi)
C. Cremonese (Regencia) – 20:10	2–2
	2–3	23:01 – Tang
	2–4	30:52 – Chu (Tang, Choi) (PP)
	2–5	31:22 – Zheng (Wang, Wong W.)
	2–6	31:53 – Chu (Tang, Chan H.)
	2–7	32:54 – Cheng (Wat, Ngan)
C. Cremonese (T. Cremonese) – 33:28	3–7
	3–8	36:24 – Tang (PP)
Javier (Füglister) – 50:19	4–8
	4–9	51:32 – Wat (Ngan, Leung)
	4–10	51:43 – Chu (Tang)

10 min
Penalties
2 min
24
Shots
65

19 April 2026; 13:00	Mongolia	13–4 (2–1, 9–1, 2–2)	Philippines	DB Ice Rink, Hong Kong; Attendance: 263

Game reference

Sodbileg Baatarkhuu
Goalies
Francois Gautier
Euan Samaniego
Referee:
(Chinese Taipei) Shen Yen-chin
Linesmen:
(Australia) Nicholas Air
(Slovakia) Miroslav Tvrdoň

Naranbaatar – 08:20	1–0
Mishigsuren (Purevdavaa) – 14:37	2–0
	2–1	16:18 – Füglister (C. Cremonese, Billones) (PP)
Mishigsuren (Batorovich, Purevdavaa) (PP) – 20:36	3–1
Urtnasan (Mishigsuren, Batorovich) (PP) – 23:37	4–1
Baatarkhuu (Ankhbayar) – 25:18	5–1
Batorovich (Baatar, Mishigsuren) – 28:55	6–1
Batorovich (Purevdavaa, Mishigsuren) (PP) – 34:12	7–1
	7–2	35:07 – Javier (Füglister) (PP)
Ankhbayar (Lkhagvasuren) – 37:04	8–2
Mishigsuren (Ankhbayar, Undarmaa) – 37:22	9–2
Purevdavaa (Ankhbayar, Undarmaa) – 37:54	10–2
Ider (Batorovich, Boldbaatar) – 38:30	11–2
	11–3	44:52 – Tigaronita (Billones) (PP)
Batdorj – 46:34	12–3
Lkhagvasuren (Urtnasan, Batbaatar) – 54:01	13–3
	13–4	58:48 – Billones (Crisostomo)

12 min
Penalties
8 min
38
Shots
35

19 April 2026; 16:30	Luxembourg	1–5 (1–1, 0–3, 0–1)	North Korea	DB Ice Rink, Hong Kong; Attendance: 234

Game reference

Jesse Barbadillo
Goalies
Kim Kang-gun
Referee:
(Spain) Carlos Trobajo
Linesmen:
(Hong Kong) Chan Ka Hei
(Chinese Taipei) Hung Chi-lun

	0–1	05:01 – Han I. (Kim Kw.)
Cannon – 11:13	1–1
	1–2	27:52 – Kim Ku. (Kim Kw., Pak K.)
	1–3	29:59 – Hwang (Pak Y.)
	1–4	39:43 – Hwang (Pak Y.)
	1–5	41:33 – Pak Y. (Kim I.)

4 min
Penalties
8 min
20
Shots
31

19 April 2026; 20:00	Hong Kong	4–9 (0–4, 1–4, 3–1)	Uzbekistan	DB Ice Rink, Hong Kong; Attendance: 615

Game reference

Rexton Chui
Hoi Hei Fung
Goalies
Daniel Muratov
Referee:
(Netherlands) Nicolaas van Grinsven
Linesmen:
(Croatia) Tomislav Grozaj
(Singapore) Michael Loh

	0–1	00:48 – Kravchenko
	0–2	04:24 – Kravchenko (Jilov)
	0–3	15:09 – Kravchenko (Dorofeev, Jilov) (PP)
	0–4	18:16 – Nazarevich (Rasulov, Sinyavskiy)
	0–5	21:13 – Dorofeev (Kravchenko, Jilov)
Cheng (Wat, Ngan) – 22:18	1–5
	1–6	23:29 – Khabibov
	1–7	28:45 – Rustamkhonov
	1–8	36:45 – Kravchenko (Dorofeev, Jilov)
Tang (Chu) (PP) – 45:37	2–8
	2–9	49:11 – Kravchenko (Sinyavskiy, Dorofeev) (PP)
Tang (Lee) (PP) – 54:16	3–9
L. Wong (Tang) – 58:22	4–9

8 min
Penalties
29 min
19
Shots
61

=== Statistics ===
==== Scoring leaders ====
List shows the top skaters sorted by points, then goals.

Player	GP	G	A	Pts	+/−	PIM	POS
(Uzbekistan) Vadim Kravchenko	5	19	16	35	+28	0	F
(Uzbekistan) Vasiliy Jilov	5	8	21	29	+24	2	F
(Uzbekistan) Pavel Sinyavskiy	5	11	17	28	+30	0	F
(Uzbekistan) Javokhir Rasulov	5	7	19	26	+31	0	F
(Uzbekistan) Egor Dorofeev	5	10	13	23	+25	0	F
(Hong Kong) Bryan Tang	5	12	8	20	+6	33	F
(Uzbekistan) Ilya Nazarevich	5	6	12	18	+29	2	D
(Uzbekistan) Artem Golubovich	5	8	8	16	+28	0	F
(Mongolia) Chinzolboo Mishigsuren	5	8	7	15	−5	0	F
(Mongolia) Batu Batorovich	5	5	9	14	−11	27	D

GP = Games played; G = Goals; A = Assists; Pts = Points; +/− = Plus/Minus; PIM = Penalties in Minutes; POS = Position
Source: IIHF.com

==== Goaltending leaders ====
Only the top five goaltenders, based on save percentage, who have played at least 40% of their team's minutes, are included in this list.

Player	TOI	GA	GAA	SA	Sv%	SO
(Hong Kong) Rexton Chui	219:32	17	4.65	150	88.67	0
(Uzbekistan) Daniel Muratov	249:38	10	2.40	79	87.34	0
(North Korea) Kim Kang-gun	236:17	16	4.06	109	85.32	0
(Luxembourg) Jesse Barbadillo	289:38	29	6.01	194	85.05	0
(Philippines) Francois Gautier	240:22	37	9.24	202	81.68	0

TOI = time on ice (minutes:seconds); SA = shots against; GA = goals against; GAA = goals against average; Sv% = save percentage; SO = shutouts
Source: IIHF.com

=== Awards ===
Position	Player
Goaltender	(Hong Kong) Rexton Chui
Defenceman	(Mongolia) Batu Batorovich
Forward	(Uzbekistan) Vadim Kravchenko
