= Shiga Blue Rise IHC =

- City: Ōtsu, Japan
- League: XHL
- Founded: 2025
- Home arena: Kinoshita Kansei Ice Arena
- Website: website

The Shiga Blue Rise IHC is an ice hockey team based in Ōtsu, Japan playing in the Extreme Ice Hockey League.
