= Nagoya Orques =

- City: Nagoya, Japan
- League: XHL
- Founded: 2023
- Home arena: Kuniwa Port Sports & Culture
- Website: website

The Nagoya Orques is an ice hockey team based in Nagoya, Japan playing in the Extreme Ice Hockey League.
