= Tokyo Wilds =

- City: Nishitokyo, Tokyo, Japan
- League: XHL
- Founded: 2023
- Home arena: DyDo Drinco Ice Arena
- Website: website

The Tokyo Wilds is an ice hockey team based in Nishitokyo, Tokyo, Japan playing in the Extreme Ice Hockey League.

== History ==
In June 2025, the Tokyo Wilds (formerly the Hokkaido Wilds) were announced as a participant in the inaugural season of the Extreme Ice Hockey League which was scheduled to kickoff in October of that year. The founding of Tokyo Wilds marked the first time since 2009, the year the Seibu Prince Rabbits folded, that a professional men's ice hockey team played in the capital region.
