= 2026 IIHF World Championship Division IV =

Tournament details
- Host country: Kuwait
- City: Kuwait City
- Venue: 1 (in 1 host city)
- Dates: 12–18 April
- Teams: 6

The 2026 IIHF World Championship Division IV was scheduled to be an international ice hockey tournament organized by the International Ice Hockey Federation.

The tournament would have been held in Kuwait City, Kuwait, from 12 to 18 April 2026.

On 18 March 2026, the tournament was postponed due to the 2026 Iran war. A week later, the tournament was cancelled.

== Planned participating teams ==
Team	Qualification
Singapore	Placed 6th in Division III B in 2025 and were relegated
Armenia	Placed 2nd in Division IV last year
Kuwait	Hosts; placed 3rd in Division IV last year
Indonesia	Placed 4th in Division IV last year
Iran	Placed 5th in Division IV last year
Malaysia	Placed 6th in Division IV last year
