= Tsen Tou Jilin City =

- City: Jilin City
- League: Supreme Hockey League
- Founded: July 2017
- Colours: Blue, black and white
- Head coach: Alexei Akifiev

Tsen Tou Jilin City (Chinese: 城投; pinyin: chéng tóu) is a Chinese Ice Hockey team based in Jilin City, China, where it was founded in 2017. Unlike the majority of teams in the Supreme Hockey League, which are affiliates of Kontinental Hockey League teams, Tsen Tou plays as an independent entity. While no formal link is in place, HC Kunlun Red Star's former manager, Vladimir Krechin, stated that the club plans to work in the future with Tsen Tou. The name of the club takes from the abbreviation of its owner, Jilin City Construction Holding Group, a city-owned enterprise.
