= Extreme Ice Hockey League =

Men's ice hockey league in Japan

Extreme Ice Hockey League (XHL)
- Current season, competition or edition: 2025–26 XHL season
- Sport: Ice hockey
- Founded: 2025; 1 year ago
- First season: 2025–26
- Administrator: JIHF
- No. of teams: 3
- Country: Japan
- Most recent champion: Tokyo Wilds
- Most titles: Tokyo Wilds (1)
- Level on pyramid: 2
- Website: https://xhl.jp/

The Extreme Ice Hockey League (XHL) is the second-tier ice hockey league in Japan, below the Asia League Ice Hockey. It is administered by the Japan Ice Hockey Federation (JIHF), a member of the IIHF.

== History ==
The Japan Ice Hockey Federation announced the creation of the Extreme Ice Hockey League in June 2025 with the first season expected to be played from October 2025 to March 2026. Initially, the teams would all be based in the Tokyo, Nagoya, and Shiga regions. The federation that it hoped the new league would help grow the sport in Japan. The first season featured three teams: Nagoya Orques, Shiga Blue Rise, and Tokyo Wilds. The league was played in a round-robin format with each team playing six home games. The first game was held on 12 October 2025 with Shiga Blue Rise hosting Nagoya Orcs at Kinoshita Kansei Ice Arena in Ōtsu.

== Current teams ==
Locations of the 2026–27 XHL teams

Extreme Hockey League Teams: 2025–26 Season
Team	Municipality	Venue	Joined league
Hokkaido Grus	Kushiro, Hokkaido	Kushiro Ice Arena	2026
Tokyo Wilds	Nishitokyo, Tokyo	DyDo Drinco Ice Arena	2025
Nagoya Orques	Nagoya, Chūbu	Kuniwa Port Sports & Culture	2025
Shiga Blue Rise	Ōtsu, Shiga	Kinoshita Kansei Ice Arena	2025

== Season results ==
Year	Champion	Runner-Up	Third
2025–26	Tokyo Wilds	Nagoya Orques	Shiga Blue Rise
2026–27			

== See also ==
- Asia League Ice Hockey
- Japan Ice Hockey Federation
- Japan men's national ice hockey team
